= 2015–16 Ranji Trophy Group C =

Cricket tournament

2015-16 Ranji Trophy Group C
- The Ranji Trophy, awarded to the winners
- Dates: 1 October 2015 – 4 December 2015
- Administrator: BCCI
- Cricket format: First-class cricket
- Tournament format: Round-robin
- Host: India
- Participants: 9
- Matches: 36

The 2015–16 Ranji Trophy is the 82nd season of the Ranji Trophy, the premier first-class cricket tournament in India. It is being contested by 27 teams divided into three groups of nine teams each.

Top two teams advance to knockout stage.

== Squads ==
Goa	Himachal Pradesh	Hyderabad	Jammu & Kashmir	Jharkhand
Dheeraj Jadhav (c); Amit Yadav; Swapnil Asnodkar; Saurabh Bandekar; Amogh Sunil Desai; Shadab Jakati; Sagun Kamat; Snehal Kauthankar; Rahul Keni (wk); Buddhadev Mangaldas; Gauresh Gawas; Darshan Misal; Amulaya Pandrekar; Prasanth Parameswaran; Rituraj Singh	Ankush Bains; Ankush Bedi; Prashant Chopra; Rishi Dhawan; Paras Dogra; Nikhil Gangta; Pankaj Jaiswal; Ankit Kalsi; Ronit More; Shresth Nirmohi; Abhimanyu Rana; Varun Sharma; Akash Vasisht	Hanuma Vihari (c); Vishal Sharma; Habeeb Ahmed (wk); Himalay Agarwal; Tanmay Agarwal; Balchander Anirudh; Anwar Ahmed; Ashish Reddy; Akash Bhandari; Mehdi Hasan; Chama Milind; Akshath Reddy; Bavanaka Sandeep; Tirumalasetti Suman; Sudeep Tyagi	Mithun Manhas (c); Parvez Rasool (vc); Samad Bhat (wk); Ian Chauhan; Shubham Khajuria; Adil Reshi; Umar Nazir Mir; Ram Dayal; Mohammed Mudhasir; Bandeep Singh; Paras Sharma; Aamir Aziz; Zahoor Sofi; Rohit Sharma	Varun Aaron (c); Kumar Deobrat (vc); Shiv Gautam (wk); Ishan Kishan; Ishank Jaggi; Jaskaran Singh; Kaushal Singh; Shahbaz Nadeem; Rameez Nemat; Samar Quadri; Rahul Shukla; Saurabh Tiwary; Vinayak Vikram; Virat Singh; Ajay Yadav

Kerala	Saurashtra	Services	Tripura
Sanju Samson (c); Nizar Niyas; Ahmed Farzeen; Akshay Chandran; Fabid Ahmed; Robert Fernandez; Raiphi Gomez; VA Jagadeesh; Akshay Kodoth; Karaparambil Monish; M. D. Nidheesh; Rohan Prem; Sachin Baby; Sandeep Warrier; Nikhilesh Surendran	Arpit Vasavada; Mohsin Ahmedbhai Dodia; Abhishek Bhat; Avi Barot; Sheldon Jackson; Dharmendrasinh Jadeja; Ravindra Jadeja; Chirag Jani; Vandit Jivrajani; Sagar Jogiyani; Kamlesh Makvana; Cheteshwar Pujara; Deepak Punia; Jaydev Shah; Jaydev Unadkat	Azaruddin Bloch; Soumik Chatterjee; Anshul Gupta; Aditya Dash; Muzzaffaruddin Khalid; Shadab Nazar; Rajat Paliwal; Diwesh Pathania; Raushan Raj; Shashank Sharma; Yashpal Singh	Abhijit Dey (c); Kaushal Acharjee (vc); Swapan Das; Arindam Das; Udiyan Bose; Subash Chakraborty; Saurabh Das; Manisankar Murasingh; Parvinder Singh; Rana Dutta; Tushar Saha; Abhijit Sarkar; Nirupam Sen; Nirupam Sen Chowdhary; Rakesh Solanki; Subhrajit Roy

== Points table ==
Team	Pld	W	L	D	A	WI	FI	Pts	NRR
Saurashtra	8	5	1	2	0	1	0	36	-0.061
Jharkhand	8	4	2	2	0	0	0	31	0.093
Himachal Pradesh	8	3	1	4	0	1	0	30	1.201
Services	8	3	1	4	0	0	1	27	0.473
Kerala	8	2	2	4	0	0	2	25	0.589
Goa	8	1	1	6	0	0	1	18	-0.206
Jammu & Kashmir	8	0	3	5	0	0	0	9	0.870
Hyderabad	8	0	2	6	0	0	0	8	-0.330
Tripura	8	0	5	3	0	0	0	3	-0.760

- Top two teams advance to knockout stage.

== Fixtures ==
=== Round 1 ===
1–4 October
Scorecard

Jharkhand	v	Services (H)
45 (37.5 overs); Rahul Shukla 13 (43); Diwesh Pathania 6/19 (16.5 overs)		161 (51 overs); Rajat Paliwal 26 (31); Rahul Shukla 3/61 (14 overs)
192 (74 overs); Saurabh Tiwary 56 (105); Diwesh Pathania 7/64 (24 overs)		78/1 (29.5 overs); Soumik Chatterjee 37 (66); Rahul Shukla 1/26 (7 overs)

Services won by 9 wickets
Palam A Stadium, Palam, New Delhi
Umpires: Krishnamachari Bharatan (Ind) and Nikhil Patwardhan (Ind)
Player of the match: Diwesh Pathania (Services)

- Services won the toss and elected to field.
- Diwesh Pathania, Poonam Poonia, Raushan Raj, Ravi Chauhan and Sufiyan Alam (all Services) all made their first-class debuts.

1–4 October
Scorecard

Saurashtra (H)	v	Tripura
307 (106 overs); Sheldon Jackson 97 (184); Tushar Saha 4/72 (27 overs)		103 (59.1 overs); Arindam Das 24 (109); Ravindra Jadeja 6/27 (27.1 overs)
		86 (53 overs) (f/o); Manisankar Murasingh 36 (47); Ravindra Jadeja 5/45 (25 overs)

Saurashtra won by an innings and 118 runs
Madhavrao Scindia Cricket Ground, Rajkot
Umpires: Sanjeev Dua and Sivasubramaniyan Shankar
Player of the match: Ravindra Jadeja (Saurashtra)

- Saurashtra won the toss and elected to bat.

1–4 October
Scorecard

Hyderabad	v	Goa (H)
325 (101 overs); Hanuma Vihari 82 (165); Rituraj Singh 3/74 (25 overs)		425/7; Sagun Kamat 109 (286); Vishal Sharma 3/93 (47.4 overs)

Match drawn
Goa Cricket Association Academy Ground, Porvorim
Umpires: Rohan Pandit and Kamlesh Sharma
Player of the match: Sagun Kamat (Goa)

- Goa won the toss and elected to field.

1–4 October
Scorecard

Jammu & Kashmir (H)	v	Kerala
330 (106.5 overs); Bandeep Singh 82 (211); Karaparambil Monish 3/63 (13.5 overs)		485/8d Sachin Baby 151 (310); Ram Dayal 3/79 (31 overs)
225 (82.5 overs); Adil Reshi 54 (107); Raiphi Gomez 3/8 (5.5 overs)		44/4 (8 overs); VA Jagadeesh 13* (19); Ram Dayal 2/15 (4 overs)

Match drawn
Sher-i-Kashmir Stadium, Srinagar
Umpires: Subrat Das and Abhijit Deshmukh
Player of the match: Sachin Baby (Kerala)

- Jammu & Kashmir won the toss and elected to bat.
- Samad Bhat (Jammu & Kashmir) and Ahmed Farzeen (Kerala) both made their first-class debuts.

=== Round 2 ===
8–11 October
Scorecard

Jharkhand	v	Saurashtra (H)
168 (43.5 overs); Ishan Kishan 87 (69); Ravindra Jadeja 6/71 (19.5 overs)		205 (50 overs); Ravindra Jadeja 58 (75); Shahbaz Nadeem 4/38 (14 overs)
122 (52 overs); Ishank Jaggi 31 (101); Ravindra Jadeja 7/55 (25 overs)		86/2 (28.5 overs); Sagar Jogiyani 46 (75); Varun Aaron 1/13 (7.5 overs)

Saurashtra won by 8 wickets
Madhavrao Scindia Cricket Ground, Rajkot
Umpires: S Ramamurthy (Ind) and Tapan Sharma (Ind)
Player of the match: Ravindra Jadeja (Saurashtra)

- Jharkhand won the toss and elected to bat.
- Vinayak Vikram (Jharkhand) made his first-class debut.

8–11 October
Scorecard

Kerala	v	Hyderabad (H)
401 (160.2 overs); Rohan Prem 208 (452); Akash Bhandari 5/72 (28.2 overs)		218 (113 overs); Balchander Anirudh 57* (155); Karaparambil Monish 6/91 (43 overs)
		176/7 (77 overs) (f/o); Tanmay Agarwal 64 (136); Karaparambil Monish 5/73 (34 overs)

Match drawn
Rajiv Gandhi International Stadium, Hyderabad
Umpires: Rajesh Deshpande (Ind) and Sanjeev Dua (Ind)
Player of the match: Rohan Prem (Kerala)

- Kerala won the toss and elected to bat.
- Fabid Ahmed (Kerala) made his first-class debut.

8–11 October
Scorecard

Jammu & Kashmir	v	Himachal Pradesh (H)
293 (94.5 overs); Parvez Rasool 114* (185); Rishi Dhawan 4/107 (30.4 overs)		554 (142.4 overs); Nikhil Gangta 203 (321); Parvez Rasool 3/140 (39.4 overs)
276 (107.5 overs); Shubham Khajuria 73 (185); Akash Vasisht 4/71 (25 overs)		16/0 (5 overs); Paras Dogra 4* (12)

Himachal Pradesh won by 10 wickets
Himachal Pradesh Cricket Association Stadium, Dharamshala
Umpires: Krishnamachari Bharatan (Ind) and Shavir Tarapore (Ind)
Player of the match: Nikhil Gangta (Himachal Pradesh)

- Himachal Pradesh won the toss and elected to field.

8–11 October
Scorecard

Services	v	Goa (H)
402 (137.1 overs); Rajat Paliwal 92 (122); Shadab Jakati 3/80 (33.1 overs)		285 (134.3 overs); Swapnil Asnodkar 139 (358); Poonam Poonia 5/60 (35.3 overs)
217/6d (65.4 overs); Soumik Chatterjee 64 (116); Amit Yadav 3/14 (13 overs)		3/0 (6 overs); Swapnil Asnodkar 2* (15)

Match drawn
Goa Cricket Association Academy Ground, Porvorim
Umpires: Umesh Dubey (Ind) and Nikhil Patwardhan (Ind)
Player of the match: Poonam Poonia (Services)

- Goa won the toss and elected to field.

=== Round 3 ===
15–18 October
Scorecard

Jharkhand	v	Kerala (H)
202 (76 overs); Saurabh Tiwary 75 (145); Sandeep Warrier 4/56 (22 overs)		148 (65.4 overs); Rohan Prem 52 (106); Varun Aaron 5/23 (16.4 overs)
262 (88.4 overs); Ishan Kishan 58 (100); Karaparambil Monish 5/66 (23.4 overs)		183 (63.5 overs); Akshay Kodoth 72 (144); Shahbaz Nadeem 7/64 (23.5 overs)

Jharkhand won by 133 runs
Perintalmanna Cricket Stadium, Malappuram
Umpires: Sanjeev Dua (Ind) and Sanjay Hazare (Ind)
Player of the match: Shahbaz Nadeem (Jharkhand)

- Kerala won the toss and elected to field.

15–18 October
Scorecard

Hyderabad	v	Himachal Pradesh (H)
434 (146.3 overs); Tanmay Agarwal 118 (302); Ronit More 4/84 (30.3 overs)		707/8d (195 overs); Robin Bist 220* (343); Chama Milind 3/161 (39 overs)
2/0 (13 overs); Tanmay Agarwal 1* (38)

Match drawn
Himachal Pradesh Cricket Association Stadium, Dharamshala
Umpires: Umesh Dubey (Ind) and Amiesh Saheba (Ind)
Player of the match: Robin Bist (Himachal Pradesh)

- Himachal Pradesh won the toss and elected to field.
- Shresth Nirmohi (Himachal Pradesh) made his first-class debut.

15–18 October
Scorecard

Tripura	v	Goa (H)
61 (31.5 overs); Kaushal Acharjee 20 (31); Rituraj Singh 3/17 (10 overs)		257 (90.1 overs); Darshan Misal 62 (150); Rana Dutta 4/44 (21.1 overs)
245 (75. overs); Manisankar Murasingh 104 (101); Shadab Jakati 5/54 (23 overs)		50/1 (25.1 overs); Sagun Kamat 28* (61); Abhijit Sarkar 1/7 (4.3 overs)

Goa won by 9 wickets
Goa Cricket Association Academy Ground, Porvorim
Umpires: Krishnamachari Bharatan (Ind) and Ulhas Gandhe (Ind)
Player of the match: Shadab Jakati (Goa)

- Tripura won the toss and elected to bat.

15–18 October
Scorecard

Jammu & Kashmir (H)	v	Services
85 (43 overs); Parvez Rasool 24* (29); Raushan Raj 7/38 (17 overs)		229 (66.4 overs); Rajat Paliwal 70 (78); Rohit Sharma 4/55 (18.4 overs)
161 (53.5 overs); Shubham Khajuria 51 (61); Muzzaffaruddin Khalid 7/61 (19.5 overs)		18/1 (3.3 overs); Soumik Chatterjee 10* (9); Rohit Sharma 1/1 (1.3 overs)

Services won by 9 wickets
Gandhi Memorial Science College Ground, Jammu
Umpires: Yeshwant Barde (Ind) and Belur Ravi (Ind)
Player of the match: Rajat Paliwal (Services)

- Services won the toss and elected to field.
- Rohit Sharma (Jammu & Kashmir) made his first-class debut.

=== Round 4 ===
22–25 October
Scorecard

Saurashtrat (H)	v	Hyderabad
102 (42 overs); Sagar Jogiyani 51 (114); Mehdi Hasan 5/43 (20 overs)		148 (42.2 overs); Kolla Sumanth 41 (52); Ravindra Jadeja 6/75 (21 overs)
215 (67 overs); Chirag Jani 65 (72); Mehdi Hasan 5/69 (26 overs)		134 (40 overs); Bavanaka Sandeep 46 (70); Ravindra Jadeja 7/60 (20 overs)

Saurashtra won by 35 runs
Saurashtra Cricket Association Stadium, Rajkot
Umpires: Krishnamachari Bharatan (Ind) and Ulhas Gandhe (Ind)
Player of the match: Ravindra Jadeja (Saurashtra)

- Saurashtra won the toss and elected to bat.

22–25 October
Scorecard

Kerala	v	Services (H)
322 (151 overs); Rohan Prem 101 (267); Rajat Paliwal 3/33 (13 overs)		319 (129.4 overs); Anshul Gupta 68 (203); Rohan Prem 4/44 (13.4 overs)
176/3d (57.1 overs); Akshay Kodoth 72 (117); Anshul Gupta 2/23 (6 overs)		43/4 (18 overs); Ravi Chauhan 17 (36); Sachin Baby 3/24 (9 overs)

Match drawn
Palam A Ground, Delhi
Umpires: Sanjay Hazare (Ind) and Kamlesh Sharma (Ind)
Player of the match: Rohan Prem (Kerala)

- Kerala won the toss and elected to bat.
- Vikas Hathwala (Services) made his first-class debut.

22–25 October
Scorecard

Goa	v	Himachala Pradesh (H)
324 (104.4 overs); Sagun Kamat 163 (305); Rishi Dhawan 6/108 (33 overs)		376 (88.2 overs); Paras Dogra 167 (230); Prasanth Parameswaran 5/82 (26 overs)
367/6d (118 overs); Snehal Kauthankar 101 (153); Rishi Dhawan 2/58 (22.3 overs)		125/2 (30 overs); Prashant Chopra 60 (86); Darshan Misal 1/13 (4 overs)

Match drawn
Himachal Pradesh Cricket Association Stadium, Dharamshala
Umpires: Rajesh Deshpande (Ind) and Nitin Pandit (Ind)

- Himachal Pradesh won the toss and elected to field.

22–25 October
Scorecard

Jammu & Kshmir	v	Tripura (H)
428 (121.2 overs); Parvez Rasool 130 (195); Abhijit Sarkar 3/66 (21.2 overs)		224 (91.3 overs); Parvinder Singh 60 (124); Ram Dayal 4/51 (25.3 overs)
163/3d (30 overs); Ian Dev Singh 40* (50); Rana Dutta 2/24 (10 overs)		243/2 (91.3 overs); Arindam Das 106* (275); Parvez Rasool 1/54 (22 overs)

Match drawn
Polytechnic Institute Ground, Agartala
Umpires: P Jayapal (Ind) and Sadashiv Iyer (Ind)
Player of the match: Parvez Rasool (Jammu & Kashmir)

- Jammu & Kashmir won the toss and elected to bat.
- Deepak Manhas (Jammu & Kashmir) made his first-class debut.

=== Round 5 ===
30 October–2 November
Scorecard

Goa	v	Jharkhand (H)
302 (98.4 overs); Swapnil Asnodkar 71 (169); Samar Quadri 6/97 (32 overs)		209 (72.4 overs); Sumit Kumar 51 (70); Shadab Jakati 5/72 (28 overs)
102/5d (37 overs); Darshan Misal 39* (68); Rahul Shukla 2/7 (5 overs)		105/6 (34 overs); Shiv Gautam 41 (97); Amit Yadav 3/47 (13 overs)

Match drawn
Keenan Stadium, Jamshedpur
Umpires: Nitin Menon (Ind) and Navdeep Singh
Player of the match: Swapnil Asnodkar (Goa)

- Goa won the toss and elected to bat.
- No play was possible on day 1.

30 October–2 November
Scorecard

Services (H)	v	Saurashtra
254 (69 overs); Rajat Paliwal 121 (142); Jaydev Unadkat 6/80 (23 overs)		264 (92.4 overs); Avi Barot 66 (103); Muzzaffaruddin Khalid 5/74 (26.4 overs)
311/6d (76 overs); Yashpal Singh 115* (149); Saurya Sanandiya 3/54 (16 overs)		302/6 (80.3 overs); Mohsin Ahmedbhai Dodia 65 (103); Muzzaffaruddin Khalid 4/147 (31 overs)

Saurashtra won by 4 wickets
Palam A Ground, Delhi
Umpires: Saiyed Khalid (Ind) and Nitin Pandit (Ind)
Player of the match: Rajat Paliwal (Services)

- Saurashtra won the toss and elected to field.
- Mohsin Ahmedbhai Dodia (Saurashtra) made his first-class debut.

30 October–2 November
Scorecard

Jammu & Kashmir	v	Hyderabad (H)
460 (131.2 overs); Mithun Manhas 150 (194); Anwar Ahmed 5/92 (40.2 overs)		280 (92 overs); Tanmay Agarwal 71 (172); Zahoor Sofi 4/37 (13 overs)
54/2 (17 overs); Ian Dev Singh 26* (42); Anwar Ahmed 1/8 (3 overs)		329 (113.1 overs) (f/o); Kolla Sumanth 78 (139); Ram Dayal 5/55 (29 overs)

Match drawn
Rajiv Gandhi International Stadium, Hyderabad
Umpires: Amiesh Saheba (Ind) and Tapan Sharma (Ind)
Player of the match: Mithun Manhas (Jammu & Kashmir)

- Hyderabad won the toss and elected to field.

30 October–2 November
Scorecard

Tripura	v	Himachal Pradesh (H)
285 (107.4 overs); Udiyan Bose 95 (244); Akshay Chauhan 3/55 (25 overs)		561/5d (130 overs); Paras Dogra 209* (242); Rana Dutta 3/79 (22 overs)
270 (84.5 overs); Nirupam Sen Chowdhary 66 (91); Ankush Bedi 3/50 (15 overs)

Himachal Pradesh won by an innings and 6 runs
Himachal Pradesh Cricket Association Stadium, Dharamshala
Umpires: Krishnamachari Srinivasan (Ind) and Ravi Subramanian (Ind)
Player of the match: Paras Dogra (Himachal Pradesh)

- Himachal Pradesh won the toss and elected to field.
- Tapash Mandal (Tripura) made his first-class debut.

=== Round 6 ===
7–10 November
Scorecard

Jharkhand (H)	v	Jammu and Kashmir
551/8d (171.2 overs); Anand Singh 124 (225); Parvez Rasool 3/127 (41.2 overs)		309 (90.2 overs); Mithun Manhas 98 (139); Kaushal Singh 4/38 (12 overs)
		265/4 (81.2 overs) (f/o); Ian Dev Singh 126 (177); Jaskaran Singh 2/38 (11 overs)

Match drawn
Keenan Stadium, Jamshedpur
Umpires: Belur Ravi (Ind) and Krishnaraj Srinath (Ind)
Player of the match: Kaushal Singh (Jharkhand)

- Jharkhand won the toss and elected to bat.

7–10 November
Scorecard

Goa	v	Saurashtra (H)
239 (84 overs); Darshan Misal 106* (208); Dharmendrasinh Jadeja 3/41 (14 overs)		258 (101.3 overs); Avi Barot 56 (127); Rituraj Singh 5/70 (33.3 overs)
299/7d (89 overs); Swapnil Asnodkar 104 (206); Kamlesh Makvana 3/85 (25 overs)		223/5 (76.1 overs); Avi Barot 93 (155); Amit Yadav 3/52 (22 overs)

Match drawn
Saurashtra Cricket Association Stadium, Rajkot
Umpires: Sudhir Asnani (Ind) and Navdeep Singh (Ind)
Player of the match: Avi Barot (Saurashtra)

- Goa won the toss and elected to bat.

7–10 November
Scorecard

Kerala (H)	v	Tripura
347 (129.5 overs); Rohan Prem 118 (264); Rana Dutta 5/50 (21.5 overs)		236 (98.2 overs); Udiyan Bose 62 (140); Sandeep Warrier 6/69 (23.2 overs)
117/4d (19.3 overs); Rohan Prem 72* (62); Manisankar Murasingh 3/57 (10 overs)		53/0 (17 overs); Udiyan Bose 32* (49)

Match drawn
Perintalmanna Cricket Stadium, Malappuram
Umpires: Ulhas Gandhe (Ind) and Rohan Pandit (Ind)
Player of the match: Rohan Prem (Kerala)

- Kerala won the toss and elected to bat.
- Subash Chakraborty (Tripura) made his first-class debut.

7–10 November
Scorecard

Himachal Pradesh (H)	v	Services
531 (138.3 overs); Paras Dogra 227 (280); Diwesh Pathania 3/108 (39 overs)		448/8 (170 overs); Yashpal Singh 115 (246); Shresth Nirmohi 3/62 (36.4 overs)

Match drawn
Himachal Pradesh Cricket Association Stadium, Dharamshala
Umpires: Amiesh Saheba (Ind) and Ravi Subramanian (Ind)

- Services won the toss and elected to field.
- Kamal Passi (Services) made his first-class debut.
- Paras Dogra (Himachal Pradesh) equalled the record for the most double centuries (seven) in the Ranji Trophy.

=== Round 7 ===
15–18 November
Scorecard

Tripura (H)	v	Jharkhand
166 (55 overs); Parvinder Singh 66 (107); Rahul Shukla 6/40 (14 overs)		394/4d (113 overs); Ishank Jaggi 102* (153); Manisankar Murasingh 2/89 (26 overs)
161 (52.5 overs); Manisankar Murasingh 52 (69); Shahbaz Nadeem 6/50 (21 overs)

Jharkhand won by an innings and 67 runs
Polytechnic Institute Ground, Agartala
Umpires: K. N. Ananthapadmanabhan (Ind) and Sadashiv Iyer (Ind)
Player of the match: Rahul Shukla (Jharkhand)

- Jharkhand won the toss and elected to field.

15–18 November
Scorecard

Himachal Pradesh	v	Saurashtra (H)
551 (168.1 overs); Prashant Chopra 187 (334); Jaydev Unadkat 4/69 (23.1 overs)		437 (172 overs); Jaydev Shah 142 (358); Akash Vasisht 3/101 (32 overs)

Match drawn
Saurashtra Cricket Association Stadium, Rajkot
Umpires: Yeshwant Barde (Ind) and P. Jayapal (Ind)
Player of the match: Prashant Chopra (Himachal Pradesh)

- Himachal Pradesh won the toss and elected to bat.

15–18 November
Scorecard

Services (H)	v	Hyderabad
353 (124 overs); Soumik Chatterjee 156 (292); Ravi Kiran 4/65 (29 overs)		272 (118.5 overs); Akshath Reddy 125 (261); Diwesh Pathania 3/63 (38 overs)
217/7d (57 overs); Diwesh Pathania 42* (29); Chama Milind 2/42 (15 overs)		140/3 (43 overs); Akshath Reddy 72* (117); Kamal Passi 2/34 (11 overs)

Match drawn
Palam A Stadium, Delhi
Umpires: Subrat Das (Ind) and Abhijit Deshmukh (Ind)
Player of the match: Soumik Chatterjee (Services)

- Hyderabad won the toss and elected to field.
- Mohammed Siraj (Hyderabad) and Amit Pachhara (Services) both made their first-class debuts.

15–18 November
Scorecard

Kerala	v	Goa (H)
441 (143.4 overs); Robert Fernandez 109 (261); Amit Yadav 4/119 (38.4 overs)		191 (68.4 overs); Amogh Sunil Desai 38 (122); Sandeep Warrier 6/44 (18.4 overs)
		167 (52.4 overs) f/o Prasanth Parameswaran 38 (37); Sandeep Warrier 3/31 (12 overs)

Kerala won by an innings and 83 runs
Goa Cricket Association Academy Ground, Porvorim
Umpires: Anil Chaudhary (Ind) and Pashchim Pathak (Ind)
Player of the match: Fabid Ahmed (Kerala)

- Kerala won the toss and elected to bat.
- Mohammed Azharuddeen (Kerala) made his first-class debut.

=== Round 8 ===
23–26 November
Scorecard

Jharkhand (H)	v	Himachal Pradesh
337 (103 overs); Shiv Gautam 122 (259); Bipul Sharma 6/59 (37 overs)		133 (36.2 overs); Ankit Kalsi 53 (87); Shahbaz Nadeem 7/45 (14.2 overs)
		133 (32.1 overs) f/o Nikhil Gangta 38 (38); Shahbaz Nadeem 4/45 (13.1 overs)

Jharkhand won by an innings and 71 runs
JSCA International Stadium Complex, Ranchi
Umpires: Yeshwant Barde (Ind) and Shavir Tarapore (Ind)
Player of the match: Shiv Gautam (Jharkhand)

- Jharkhand won the toss and elected to bat.
- Sonu Singh (Jharkhand) made his first-class debut.

23–26 November
Scorecard

Kerala (H)	v	Saurashtra
166 (66.2 overs); V. A. Jagadeesh 59 (134); Dharmendrasinh Jadeja 5/44 (20.2 overs)		157 (60.4 overs); Samarth Vyas 54 (90); Karaparambil Monish 6/81 (27 overs)
105 (41 overs); Akshay Chandran 32* (74); Dharmendrasinh Jadeja 6/59 (17 overs)		69 (33.1 overs); Saurya Sanandiya 17 (32); Karaparambil Monish 5/46 (16 overs)

Kerala won by 45 runs
Perintalmanna Cricket Stadium, Malappuram
Umpires: Sudhir Asnani (Ind) and Nikhil Patwardhan (Ind)
Player of the match: Karaparambil Monish (Kerala)

- Kerala won the toss and elected to bat.
- Vandit Jivrajani and Samarth Vyas (Saurashtra) both made their first-class debuts.

23–26 November
Scorecard

Hyderabad (H)	v	Tripura
548/5d (173 overs); Hanuma Vihari 219 (447); Manisankar Murasingh 2/82 (33 overs)		237 (82.4 overs); Arindam Das 73 (172); Ravi Kiran 3/45 (20.4 overs)
294/5 (88 overs); Parvinder Singh 104* (183); Himalay Agarwal 2/21 (4 overs)

Match drawn
Rajiv Gandhi International Stadium, Hyderabad
Umpires: Ulhas Gandhe (Ind) and Sanjay Hazare (Ind)
Player of the match: Hanuma Vihari (Hyderabad)

- Tripura won the toss and elected to field.

23–26 November
Scorecard

Goa	v	Jammu & Kashmir (H)
552/5d (162 overs); Swapnil Asnodkar 232 (360); Parvez Rasool 4/169 (52 overs)		501 (140.5 overs); Mithun Manhas 135 (231); Shadab Jakati 4/103 (32.5 overs)
82/1 (19 overs); Darshan Misal 41 (47); Aamir Aziz 1/25 (4 overs)

Match drawn
Gandhi Memorial Science College Ground, Jammu
Umpires: Umesh Dubey and Chirra Ravikanthreddy
Player of the match: Swapnil Asnodkar (Goa)

- Jammu & Kashmir won the toss and elected to field.
- Abhinav Puri, Pranav Gupta and Aamir Sofi (Jammu & Kashmir) all made their first-class debuts.

=== Round 9 ===
1–4 December
Scorecard

Hyderabad (H)	v	Jharkhand
145 (76.1 overs); Bavanaka Sandeep 39 (108); Jaskaran Singh 3/32 (14.1 overs)		388/8d (104.4 overs); Saurabh Tiwary 209* (283); Chama Milind 3/77 (22 overs)
269 (101.4 overs); Balchander Anirudh 79* (136); Rahul Shukla 5/89 (26 overs)		29/0 (3.4 overs); Anand Singh 22* (13)

Jharkhand won by 10 wickets
Rajiv Gandhi International Stadium, Hyderabad
Umpires: Umesh Dubey (Ind) and Nitin Pandit (Ind)

- Jharkhand won the toss and elected to field.

1–4 December
Scorecard

Jammu & Kashmir (H)	v	Saurashtra
138 (49.1 overs); Aamir Aziz 32 (58); Saurya Sanandiya 5/53 (17 overs)		497 (126.2 overs); Sheldon Jackson 121 (142); Zahoor Sofi 3/51 (20 overs)
296 (86.4 overs); Ian Dev Singh 127 (179); Kamlesh Makvana 7/100 (26.4 overs)

Saurashtra won by an innings and 63 runs
Gandhi Memorial Science College Ground, Jammu
Umpires: Ulhas Gandhe (Ind) and Chirra Ravikanthreddy (Ind)
Player of the match: Kamlesh Makvana (Saurashtra)

- Saurashtra won the toss and elected to field.
- Umar Nissar (Jammu & Kashmir) made his first-class debut.

1–4 December
Scorecard

Kerala (H)	v	Himachal Pradesh
103 (47.4 overs); Sanju Samson 25 (88); Rahul Singh 6/19 (19.4 overs)		163 (37.5 overs); Prashant Chopra 40 (63); Fabid Ahmed 3/12 (4.5 overs)
83 (25.2 overs); Sanju Samson 19 (30); Bipul Sharma 6/33 (10.2 overs)		24/4 (4.3 overs); Ankit Kalsi 10* (10); Karaparambil Monish 4/0 (2 overs)

Himachal Pradesh won by 6 wickets
Perintalmanna Cricket Stadium, Malappuram
Umpires: Nitin Menon (Ind) and Nikhil Patwardhan (Ind)
Player of the match: Prashant Chopra (Himachal Pradesh)

- Kerala won the toss and elected to bat.

1–4 December
Scorecard

Services	v	Tripura (H)
512 (136.3 overs); Rajat Paliwal 203 (266); Rana Dutta 4/104 (35 overs)		230 (84 overs); Saurabh Das 53 (115); Diwesh Pathania 3/49 (22 overs)
		220 (94.5 overs) f/o Parvinder Singh 58 (96); Raushan Raj 3/37 (17 overs)

Services won by an innings and 62 runs
Maharaja Bir Bikram College Stadium, Agartala
Umpires: Krishnamachari Bharatan (Ind) and Shavir Tarapore (Ind)
Player of the match: Rajat Paliwal (Services)

- Tripura won the toss and elected to field.
