= 2015–16 Vijay Hazare Trophy Group D =

Cricket tournament

- Dates: 10 December 2015 – 15 December 2015
- Administrator: BCCI
- Cricket format: List A cricket
- Tournament format: Round robin
- Host: Saurashtra
- Participants: 6
- Matches: 15

2015–16 Vijay Hazare Trophy is the 14th season of the Vijay Hazare Trophy, a List A cricket tournament in India. It is contested by 27 domestic cricket teams of India divided into 4 Groups. The winner will advance to play 2015–16 Deodhar Trophy.

The top two teams advanced to the quarter finals.

== Fixtures ==
=== Round one ===
Ashoke Dinda (3/40)-led attack held Goa to 235 for nine, Manoj Tiwary took Bengal to victory with an unbeaten 62-run knock off as many balls. Chasing the target, Shreevats Goswami (70) set-up the innings with a 116-run opening stand with S Mondal. The Bengal captain then took his team to the target with 52 balls to spare.

10 December 2015
Scorecard

| Goa; 235/9 (50 overs) | v | Bengal; 238/4 (41.2 overs) |
| Saurabh Bandekar 62 (53); Ashok Dinda 3/40 (10 overs) | | Shreevats Goswami 70 (77); Darshan Misal 2/36 (6 overs) |

Bengal won by 6 wickets
Madhavrao Scindia Cricket Ground, Rajkot
Umpires: Ulhas Gandhe and Shavir Tarapore

- Bengal won the toss and elected to field.
- Aamir Gani, Sayan Ghosh and Pankaj Shaw (Bengal) all made their List A debuts.

Leading from the front, captain Eklavya Dwivedi led UP to the 244-run target with an unbeaten 104. The batsman's maiden List A century came off 127 balls with 15 boundaries. He was ably supported by Rinku Singh, who remained not out on 62. Earlier while Praveen Kumar (2/37) and Piyush Chawla (3/49) claimed wickets at regular intervals, Rishi Dhawan lifted HP to 243 with an unbeaten 67-run knock. Left on 126 for six the all-rounder had held the innings together to take the team to a modest score.

10 December 2015
Scorecard

| Himachal Pradesh; 243/8 (50 overs) | v | Uttar Pradesh; 247/3 (47.2 overs) |
| Rishi Dhawan 67* (64); Piyush Chawla 3/49 (10 overs) | | Eklavya Dwivedi 104* (127); Ronit More 1/24 (8 overs) |

Uttar Pradesh won by 7 wickets
Saurashtra Cricket Association Stadium, Rajkot
Umpires: Subrat Das and Chettithody Shamshuddin

- Uttar Pradesh won the toss and elected to field.
- Israr Azim, Mohammad Javed, Samarth Singh and Saurabh Kumar (Uttar Pradesh) all made their List A debuts.

=== Round two ===
Ravindra Jadeja starred in the Saurashtra's victory with the bat and the ball. While Sheldon Jackson scored 111, Jadeja made 134 off 117 before falling to Ishwar Pandey off the last ball. After being left on 53 for three, Jackson and Jadeja built a 135-run partnership to revive the innings. The all-rounder then built a 152-run stand for the fifth wicket with Chirag Jani to set MP a stiff target.

Jalaj Saxena then led MP's fight with a run-a-ball 133 while Rajat Patidar and Naman Ojha scored half-centuries to keep the team in the game. While Shaurya Sanandia claimed three, Jaydev Unadkat claimed two and Jadeja wrapped-up MP's innings for 334 to finish with two scalps.

11 December 2015
Scorecard

| Saurashtra; 340/5 (50 overs) | v | Madhya Pradesh; 333 (49.1 overs) |
| Ravindra Jadeja 134 (117); Ishwar Pandey 1/55 (10 overs) | | Jalaj Saxena 133 (133); Saurya Sanandiya 3/59 (10 overs) |

Saurashtra won by 7 runs
Saurashtra Cricket Association Stadium, Rajkot
Umpires: Subrat Das and Chettithody Shamshuddin

- Madhya Pradesh won the toss and elected to field.
- Venkatesh Iyer, Rajat Patidar, Parth Sahani (Madhya Pradesh) and Deepak Punia (Saurashtra) all made their List A debuts.

The 157-run stand for the second wicket between Prashant Chopra (91) and Robin Bist (84) laid a platform for a formidable score for HP after being asked to bat. Paras Dogra (78) and Rishi Dhawan (31) then added 101 for the fourth wicket to keep the innings on course. The rest of the lineup did poorly but the two solid partnerships helped the team to a 308-run total.

Pankaj Jaswal then claimed three while captain Bipul Sharma picked two wickets to bowl Bengal out for 219 and post their first win of the tournament.

11 December 2015
Scorecard

| Himachal Pradesh; 308/7 (50 overs) | v | Bengal; 219 (36.3 overs) |
| Prashant Chopra 91 (98); Sayan Ghosh 3/67 (7 overs) | | Pankaj Shaw 68 (53); Pankaj Jaiswal 3/28 (7 overs) |

Himachal Pradesh won by 89 runs
Madhavrao Scindia Cricket Ground, Rajkot
Umpires: Ulhas Gandhe and Shavir Tarapore

- Bengal won the toss and elected to field.

Ravindra Jadeja starred in the Saurashtra's victory with the bat and the ball. While Sheldon Jackson scored 111, Jadeja made 134 off 117 before falling to Ishwar Pandey off the last ball. After being left on 53 for three, Jackson and Jadeja built a 135-run partnership to revive the innings. The all-rounder then built a 152-run stand for the fifth wicket with Chirag Jani to set MP a stiff target.

Jalaj Saxena then led MP's fight with a run-a-ball 133 while Rajat Patidar and Naman Ojha scored half-centuries to keep the team in the game. While Shaurya Sanandia claimed three, Jaydev Unadkat claimed two and Jadeja wrapped-up MP's innings for 334 to finish with two scalps.

12 December 2015
Scorecard

| Goa; 199 (47.4 overs) | v | Saurashtra; 202/0 (26.3 overs) |
| Sagun Kamat 95 (141); Saurya Sanandiya 3/41 (8.4 overs) | | Sheldon Jackson 150* (103) |

Saurashtra won by 10 wickets
Saurashtra Cricket Association Stadium, Rajkot
Umpires: Subrat Das and Ulhas Gandhe

- Saurashtra won the toss and elected to field.
- This was Sheldon Jackson's second century in as many days in the competition.

=== Round three ===
13 December 2015
Scorecard

| Bengal; 221 (48.3 overs) | v | Uttar Pradesh; 222/6 (46.4 overs) |
| Sudip Chatterjee 97 (144); Mohammad Javed 4/40 (8.3 overs) | | Umang Sharma 73 (94); Mohammed Shami 2/52 (10 overs) |

Uttar Pradesh won by 4 wickets
Saurashtra Cricket Association Stadium, Rajkot
Umpires: Chettithody Shamshuddin and R. Sundar

- Bengal won the toss and elected to bat.
- Mukesh Kumar (Bengal) made his List A debut.

13 December 2015
Scorecard

| Goa; 214 (43.3 overs) | v | Madhya Pradesh; 215/3 (42.2 overs) |
| Saurabh Bandekar 68 (68); Jalaj Saxena 2/21 (4.2 overs) | | Harpreet Singh 74* (72); Shadab Jakati 2/49 (10 overs) |

Madhya Pradesh won by 7 wickets
Madhavrao Scindia Cricket Ground, Rajkot
Umpires: Subrat Das and Shavir Tarapore

- Goa won the toss and elected to bat.
- Chandrakant Sakure (Madhya Pradesh) made his List A debut.

=== Round four ===
14 December 2015
Scorecard

| Saurashtra; 195 (48.4 overs) | v | Himachal Pradesh; 197/3 (43.2 overs) |
| Cheteshwar Pujara 73 (113); Ronit More 3/44 (9 overs) | | Ankush Bains 76 (109); Kamlesh Makvana 2/26 (6.2 overs) |

Himachal Pradesh won by 7 wickets
Madhavrao Scindia Cricket Ground, Rajkot
Umpires: Ulhas Gandhe and R. Sundar

- Saurashtra won the toss and elected to bat.

14 December 2015
Scorecard

| Uttar Pradesh; 211 (46.3 overs) | v | Madhya Pradesh; 212/2 (39.1 overs) |
| Akshdeep Nath 67 (74); Puneet Datey 2/32 (9 overs) | | Naman Ojha 114* (122); Bhuvneshwar Kumar 1/44 (8 overs) |

Madhya Pradesh won by 8 wickets
Saurashtra Cricket Association Stadium, Rajkot
Umpires: Umesh Dubey and Chettithody Shamshuddin

- Madhya Pradesh won the toss and elected to field.

=== Round five ===
16 December 2015
Scorecard

| Goa; 184 (45.4 overs) | v | Himachal Pradesh; 187/3 (29.2 overs) |
| Sagun Kamat 57 (95); Pankaj Jaiswal 3/26 (7.4 overs) | | Prashant Chopra 67 (53); Shadab Jakati 3/33 (7 overs) |

Himachal Pradesh won by 7 wickets
Saurashtra Cricket Association Stadium, Rajkot
Umpires: Subrat Das and Umesh Dubey

- Himachal Pradesh won the toss and elected to field.

16 December 2015
Scorecard

| Saurashtra; 189 (48.5 overs) | v | Uttar Pradesh; 191/5 (44.4 overs) |
| Cheteshwar Pujara 41 (68); Piyush Chawla 3/53 (10 overs) | | Shubham Chaubey 85* (125); Dharmendrasinh Jadeja 2/38 (10 overs) |

Uttar Pradesh won by 5 wickets
Madhavrao Scindia Cricket Ground, Rajkot
Umpires: Chettithody Shamshuddin and R. Sundar

- Uttar Pradesh won the toss and elected to field.
- Shubham Chaubey (Uttar Pradesh) made his List A debut.

=== Round six ===
17 December 2015
Scorecard

| Bengal; 262 (50 overs) | v | Madhya Pradesh; 263/5 (46.5 overs) |
| Sayan Mondal 88 (109); Puneet Datey 2/42 (10 overs) | | Harpreet Singh 71 (72); Ashok Dinda 2/35 (9.5 overs) |

Madhya Pradesh won by 5 wickets
Saurashtra Cricket Association Stadium, Rajkot
Umpires: Chettithody Shamshuddin and R. Sundar

- Madhya Pradesh won the toss and elected to field.
- Abhimanyu Easwaran (Bengal) made his List A debut.

17 December 2015
Scorecard

| Goa; 218 (49.5 overs) | v | Uttar Pradesh; 224/4 (36.3 overs) |
| Reagan Pinto 66 (81); Suresh Raina 2/32 (8 overs) | | Umang Sharma 85* (94); Shadab Jakati 3/48 (10 overs) |

Uttar Pradesh won by 6 wickets
Madhavrao Scindia Cricket Ground, Rajkot
Umpires: Subrat Das and Umesh Dubey

- Uttar Pradesh won the toss and elected to field.

=== Round seven ===
18 December 2015
Scorecard

| Bengal; 243/5 (50 overs) | v | Saurashtra; 246/4 (46 overs) |
| Abhimanyu Easwaran 48 (56); Dharmendrasinh Jadeja 3/46 (10 overs) | | Samarth Vyas 94 (103); Aamir Gani 1/40 (10 overs) |

Saurashtra won by 6 wickets
Saurashtra Cricket Association Stadium, Rajkot
Umpires: Chettithody Shamshuddin and R. Sundar

- Bengal won the toss and elected to bat.
- Pradipta Pramanik (Bengal); Vandit Jivrajani and Samarth Vyas (Saurashtra) all made their List A debuts.

18 December 2015
Scorecard

| Himachal Pradesh; 295/5 (50 overs) | v | Madhya Pradesh; 254 (46.1 overs) |
| Rishi Dhawan 117* (88); Chandrakant Sakure 1/37 (5 overs) | | Venkatesh Iyer 57 (70); Pankaj Jaiswal 6/33 (9.1 overs) |

Himachal Pradesh won by 41 runs
Madhavrao Scindia Cricket Ground, Rajkot
Umpires: Subrat Das and Umesh Dubey

- Madhya Pradesh won the toss and elected to field
