= List of Services cricketers =

This is a list of cricketers who have played first-class, List A or Twenty20 cricket for Services cricket team. Seasons given are first and last seasons; the player did not necessarily play in all the intervening seasons. Players in bold have played international cricket.

== C ==
- Soumik Chatterjee, 2006/07-2016/17

== D ==
- Pratik Desai, 2010/11-2014/15

== G ==
- Anshul Gupta, ??-??

== N ==
- Shadab Nazar, ??-??

== P ==
- Rajat Paliwal, ??-??
- Diwesh Pathania, ??-??
- Deepak Punia, ??-??

== S ==
- Shashank Sharma, ??-??
- Harcharan Singh
- Avishek Sinha (born 18 October 1985), 2007/08–2017/18

== V ==
- Nakul Verma, ??-??

== Y ==
- Suraj Yadav, ??-??
