= 2008–09 Ranji Trophy =

Cricket tournament

- The Ranji Trophy.
- Administrator: BCCI
- Cricket format: First-class cricket
- Tournament format(s): League and knockout
- Champions: Mumbai (38th title)
- Participants: 27
- Most runs: Wasim Jaffer (Mumbai) (1260)
- Most wickets: Dhawal Kulkarni (Mumbai) (42); Ravindra Jadeja (Saurashtra) (42)

The season 2008–09 of the Ranji Trophy began on 4 November, and finished on 16 January with the final. 15 teams were divided in two groups. The 3 top teams of each group qualified to the playoffs, plus the two top teams of the plate league (Himachal Pradesh and Bengal). Mumbai won the final by defeating Uttar Pradesh.

== First round ==
=== Group A ===
Team	Pld	Won	Lost	Tied	Draw	Aban	Pts	Quo
Mumbai	7	5	0	0	2	0	31	1.741
Gujarat	7	4	1	0	2	0	28	1.593
Saurashtra	7	3	2	0	2	0	23	1.401
Delhi	7	2	0	0	5	0	20	1.094
Punjab	7	2	3	0	2	0	12	0.800
Hyderabad	7	0	3	0	4	0	10	0.809
Orissa	7	1	4	0	2	0	9	0.640
Rajasthan	7	0	4	0	3	0	3	0.538

3–6 Nov 2008 (scorecard)	Delhi; 519	v	Punjab; 391 and 140/3	Match drawn Venue :Delhi

3–6 Nov 2008 (scorecard)	Mumbai; 307 and 305/7d	v	Rajasthan; 204 and 171	Mumbai won by 237 runs Venue :Mumbai

3–6 Nov 2008 (scorecard)	Orissa; 269	v	Hyderabad (India); 296 and 263/5	Match drawn Venue :Cuttack

3–6 Nov 2008 (scorecard)	Saurashtra; 153 and 201 (f/o)	v	Gujarat; 581/6d	Gujarat won by an innings and 227 runs Venue :Rajkot

10–12 Nov 2008 (scorecard)	Gujarat; 203 and 44 (f/o)	v	Mumbai; 486	Mumbai won by an innings and 239 runs Venue :Surat

10–13 Nov 2008 (scorecard)	Hyderabad (India); 334 and 230/3	v	Delhi; 284	Match drawn Venue :Hyderabad

10–12 Nov 2008 (scorecard)	Punjab; 262 and 41/1	v	Rajasthan; 133 and 169	Punjab won by 9 wickets Venue :Mohali

10–13 Nov 2008 (scorecard)	Saurashtra; 620/4d	v	Orissa; 302 and 234 (f/o)	Saurashtra won by an innings and 84 runs Venue :Rajkot

16–19 Nov 2008 (scorecard)	Delhi; 295	v	Mumbai; 330 and 468/4	Match drawn Venue :Delhi

16–19 Nov 2008 (scorecard)	Gujarat; 520/9d	v	Hyderabad (India); 225 and 287/7 (f/o)	Match drawn Venue :Ahmedabad

16–19 Nov 2008 (scorecard)	Orissa; 281 and 209	v	Rajasthan; 270 and 131/4	Match drawn Venue :Sambalpur

16–19 Nov 2008 (scorecard)	Saurashtra; 679/8	v	Punjab; 482	Match drawn Venue :Rajkot

23–26 Nov 2008 (scorecard)	Gujarat; 350 and 259/6	v	Delhi; 314	Match drawn Venue :Valsad

23–26 Nov 2008 (scorecard)	Hyderabad (India); 553/6d and 33/0	v	Rajasthan; 405	Match drawn Venue :Hyderabad

23–26 Nov 2008 (scorecard)	Orissa; 352 and 87/1	v	Punjab; 60 and 378	Orissa won by 9 wickets Venue :Bhubaneswar

23–26 Nov 2008 (scorecard)	Saurashtra; 643/4d	v	Mumbai; 214 and 157/7 (f/o)	Match drawn Venue :Rajkot

29–30 Nov 2008 (scorecard)	Delhi; 78 and 150	v	Orissa; 80 and 96	Delhi won by 52 runs Venue :Delhi

29 Nov – 1 Dec 2008 (scorecard)	Gujarat; 300 and 34/0	v	Punjab; 137 and 192 (f/o)	Gujarat won by 10 wickets Venue :Ahmedabad

29 Nov – 1 Dec 2008 (scorecard)	Saurashtra; 344	v	Rajasthan; 185 and 85 (f/o)	Saurashtra won by an innings and 74 runs Venue :Rajkot

2–5 Dec 2008 (scorecard)	Mumbai; 602/6d	v	Hyderabad (India); 251 and 243 (f/o)	Mumbai won by an innings and 108 runs Venue :Mumbai

12–15 Dec 2008 (scorecard)	Hyderabad (India); 335 and 164	v	Punjab; 291 and 211/1	Punjab won by 9 wickets Venue :Hyderabad

12–14 Dec 2008 (scorecard)	Orissa; 108 and 118	v	Mumbai; 180 and 361/5d	Mumbai won by 315 runs Venue :Cuttack

12–14 Dec 2008 (scorecard)	Rajasthan; 136 and 186	v	Gujarat; 227 and 99/3	Gujarat won by 7 wickets Venue :Jaipur

12–15 Dec 2008 (scorecard)	Saurashtra; 241 and 274	v	Delhi; 384 and 132/0	Delhi won by 10 wickets Venue :Rajkot

18–21 Dec 2008 (scorecard)	Mumbai; 436/9d and 151/1	v	Punjab; 202 and 382	Mumbai won by 9 wickets Venue :Mumbai

18–21 Dec 2008 (scorecard)	Orissa; 162 and 154	v	Gujarat; 394	Gujarat won by an innings and 78 runs Venue :Bhubaneswar

18–21 Dec 2008 (scorecard)	Rajasthan; 295 and 55/3	v	Delhi; 688	Match drawn Venue :Jaipur

18–20 Dec 2008 (scorecard)	Saurashtra; 133 and 183	v	Hyderabad (India); 140 and 71	Saurashtra won by 105 runs Venue :Rajkot

=== Group B ===
Team	Pld	Won	Lost	Tied	Draw	Aban	Pts	Quo
Tamil Nadu	6	2	0	0	4	0	23	2.110
Karnataka	6	3	0	0	3	0	19	1.126
Uttar Pradesh	6	1	1	0	4	0	17	0.970
Baroda	6	2	2	0	2	0	15	1.019
Railways	6	1	0	0	5	0	12	0.863
Maharashtra	6	0	3	0	3	0	7	0.731
Andhra	6	0	3	0	3	0	3	0.704

3–6 Nov 2008 (scorecard)	Karnataka; 365 and 127	v	Railways; 389 and 17/2	Match drawn Venue :Bangalore

3–6 Nov 2008 (scorecard)	Maharashtra; 457 and 250/6 (f/o)	v	Tamil Nadu; 648/3d	Match drawn Venue :Nasik

3–6 Nov 2008 (scorecard)	Uttar Pradesh; 412	v	Andhra; 349 and 130/2	Match drawn Venue :Meerut

10–13 Nov 2008 (scorecard)	Baroda; 235 and 314	v	Uttar Pradesh; 286 and 151/6	Match drawn Venue :Vadodara

10–13 Nov 2008 (scorecard)	Karnataka; 267 and 269/4 (f/o)	v	Tamil Nadu; 531	Match drawn Venue :Bangalore

10–13 Nov 2008 (scorecard)	Maharashtra; 393 and 27/1	v	Andhra; 348 and 210/5d	Match drawn Venue :Nasik

16–19 Nov 2008 (scorecard)	Karnataka; 366 and 171	v	Andhra; 218 and 117	Karnataka won by 202 runs Venue :Mysore

16–19 Nov 2008 (scorecard)	Railways; 224 and 240/5	v	Baroda; 460/8d	Match drawn Venue :Delhi

16–18 Nov 2008 (scorecard)	Uttar Pradesh; 150 and 119	v	Tamil Nadu; 507	Tamil Nadu won by an innings and 238 runs Venue :Ghaziabad

23–26 Nov 2008 (scorecard)	Karnataka; 395 and 60/0	v	Baroda; 169 and 285	Karnataka won by 10 wickets Venue :Bangalore

23–26 Nov 2008 (scorecard)	Railways; 227 and 90/3	v	Andhra; 208 and 108	Railways won by 7 wickets Venue :Delhi

23–26 Nov 2008 (scorecard)	Uttar Pradesh; 315 and 140/2	v	Maharashtra; 221 and 230	Uttar Pradesh won by 8 wickets Venue :Kanpur

29 Nov – 2 Dec 2008 (scorecard)	Andhra; 283 and 95/3	v	Tamil Nadu; 286/4d	Match drawn Venue :Vijayawada

29 Nov – 2 Dec 2008 (scorecard)	Baroda; 305 and 229/6	v	Maharashtra; 228 and 303	Baroda won by 4 wickets Venue :Vadodara

29 Nov – 2 Dec 2008 (scorecard)	Railways; 200 and 215/8	v	Uttar Pradesh; 346 and 150/6d	Match drawn Venue :Delhi

12–14 Dec 2008 (scorecard)	Baroda; 166 and 94	v	Tamil Nadu; 117 and 402	Tamil Nadu won by 259 runs Venue :Vadodara

12–15 Dec 2008 (scorecard)	Karnataka; 511	v	Uttar Pradesh; 567	Match drawn Venue :Bangalore

12–15 Dec 2008 (scorecard)	Maharashtra; 244 and 251/5	v	Railways; 212 and 334/6d	Match drawn Venue :Ratnagiri

18–20 Dec 2008 (scorecard)	Baroda; 400	v	Andhra; 77 and 263 (f/o)	Baroda won by an innings and 60 runs Venue :Vadodara

18–20 Dec 2008 (scorecard)	Karnataka; 252 and 229	v	Maharashtra; 210 and 116	Karnataka won by 155 runs Venue :Bangalore

18–21 Dec 2008 (scorecard)	Tamil Nadu; 475/6d and 389/7d	v	Railways; 314	Match drawn Venue :Chennai

== Playoffs ==
Four top teams of the plate group league qualified for the playoffs.

Wild-Card; 18–21 December 2008
Himachal Pradesh	Win
Madhya Pradesh
Bengal	FIL
Goa

Quarterfinals; 26–29 December 2008
Mumbai	Win
Himachal Pradesh
Saurashtra	Win
Karnataka
Gujarat
Uttar Pradesh	FIL
Tamil Nadu	Win
Bengal

Semifinals; 4–7 January 2009
Mumbai	FIL
Saurashtra
Uttar Pradesh	FIL
Tamil Nadu

Final; 12–16 January 2009
Mumbai	Win
Uttar Pradesh

* FIL – First Innings Lead

=== Plate playoffs ===
18–21 December
Scorecard

Himachal Pradesh	v	Madhya Pradesh
579 (189.5 overs); Mukesh Sharma 161 (380); Yogesh Golwalkar 189/3 (48 overs)		228 (83.4 overs); Jalaj Saxena 107 (194); Ashok Thakur 40/4 (20 overs)
		176 (50.3 overs); Hrishikesh Kanitkar 66 (174); Mohinder Sharma 45/5 (15.3 overs)

Himachal Pradesh won by an innings and 175 runs
Vidarbha Cricket Association Ground, Nagpur
Umpires: Purnachandra Godbole and T. R. Kashyappan

18–21 December
Scorecard

Bengal	v	Goa
337 (79.0 overs); Dibyendu Chakrabarty 82 (223); Saurabh Bandekar 75/6 (33 overs)		230 (83.5 overs); Ryan Ninan 88* (320); Ranadeb Bose 62/6 (26 overs)
193/5 (46.0 overs); Manoj Tiwary 80 (118); Harshad Gadekar 32/2 (11 overs)

Match drawn, Bengal advanced
Karnail Singh Stadium, Delhi
Umpires: Subrat Das and Avdhoot Gokhale

=== Quarterfinals ===
26–29 December
Scorecard

Mumbai	v	Himachal Pradesh
495 (124.4 overs); Wasim Jaffer 108 (183); Jitender Mehta 87/3 (19 overs)		250 (80.5 overs); Sarandeep Singh 75 (121); Abhishek Nayar 45/6 (17 overs)
43/1 (13.4 overs); Vinayak Samant 24* (36); Bhavin Thakkar 18/1 (3.4 overs)		287 (68.4 overs); Paras Dogra 90 (97); Ajit Agarkar 78/5 (18 overs)

Mumbai won by 9 wickets
Sardar Patel Stadium, Motera
Umpires: Sanjeeva Rao and Shavir Tarapore

26–29 December
Scorecard

Saurashtra	v	Karnataka
189 (79 overs); Ravindra Jadeja 38 (74); C Raghu 8/2 (6 overs)		305 (99.5 overs); Robin Uthappa 139 (200); Ravindra Jadeja 82/5 (32 overs)
327/5 (79 overs); Cheteshwar Pujara 112 (224); Vinay Kumar 84/3 (20 overs)		208 (80.1 overs); Balachandra Akhil 56 (127); Sandeep Jobanputra 54/5 (22.1 overs)

Saurashtra won by 5 wickets
Brabourne Stadium, Mumbai
Umpires: Sanjay Hazare &Suresh Shastri

26–29 December
Scorecard

Gujarat	v	Uttar Pradesh
117 (40.2 overs); Timil Patel 43* (77); Praveen Kumar 29/5 (13.2 overs)		305 (112.5 overs); Suresh Raina 93 (172); Ashraf Makda 40/3 (22 overs)
106/3 (47 overs); Nilesh Modi 57(148); Bhuvneshwar Kumar 12/2 (9 overs)		375 (146.1 overs); Praveen Gupta 74 (108); Mohnish Parmar 113/5 (48.1 overs)

Match Drawn, Uttar Pradesh advanced
Moti Bagh Stadium, Vadodara
Umpires: Subroto Daas & Madanmohan Singh

26–29 December
Scorecard

Tamil Nadu	v	Bengal
306 (98.5 overs); Suresh Kumar 75 (130); Ritam Kundu 54/2 (14 overs)		345 (115 overs); Manoj Tiwary 144 (201); C. Ganapathy 59/5 (26 overs)
227/2 (52 overs); Subramaniam Badrinath 92 (116); Sourav Sarkar 36/1 (9 overs)		187 (65.5 overs); Laxmi Shukla 47 (96); Lakshmipathy Balaji 24/6 (20 overs)

Tamil Nadu won by 8 wickets
M Chinnaswamy Stadium, Bangalore
Umpires: Sudhir Asnani & Krishna Hariharan

=== Semi-finals ===
Mumbai were the first team to qualify for the final after on the basis of a lead over Saurashtra's first-innings total. The latter were dismissed for 379 in their first innings by Mumbai who made 637. Wasim Jaffer top-scored with 301 for them, while Sachin Tendulkar made 122.

Uttar Pradesh advanced to the final, also by virtue of a first-innings lead, over Tamil Nadu. In reply to the latter's first innings total of 445, Uttar Pradesh's Shivakant Shukla, who made an unbeaten 178 in 569 balls and 821 minutes, helped his team go past the score securing a qualification for the final. Parvinder Singh, who scored his maiden first-class century, and Shukla batted for a total of five-and-half-hours, and added 272 runs for the fourth wicket.

4–7 January 2009
Scorecard

Mumbai	v	Saurashtra
637/6d (180 overs); Wasim Jaffer 301 (459); Ravindra Jadeja 150/2 (39 overs)		379 (130 overs); Shitanshu Kotak 89 (325); Ramesh Powar 108/4 (35 overs)
42/1 (12 overs); Rohit Sharma 30* (40); Ravindra Jadeja 11/1 (5 overs)

Match drawn, Mumbai advanced to the final
MA Chidambaram Stadium, Chennai
Umpires: Sanjay Hazare and Amiesh Saheba

- Mumbai won the toss and elected to bat.
- Ajinkya Rahane (Mumbai) passed 1,000 runs, and Jaydev Shah and Rakesh Dhruv (both Saurashtra) passed 2,000 runs each in first-class cricket.

4–7 January 2009
Scorecard

Tamil Nadu	v	Uttar Pradesh
445 (164.5 overs); Abhinav Mukund 100 (175); Praveen Kumar 3/104 (41 overs)		447/8 (192.3 overs); Shivakant Shukla 178* (569); Lakshmipathy Balaji 5/114 (53.3 overs)

Match drawn, Uttar Pradesh advanced to the final
Vidarbha Cricket Association Stadium, Nagpur
Umpires: Suresh Shastri and Shavir Tarapore

- Tamil Nadu won the toss and elected to bat.
- Parvinder Singh (Uttar Pradesh) scored his first century in first-class cricket.
- Shivakant Shukla's (Uttar Pradesh) innings of 178 was then the fourth longest innings in first-class cricket in terms of minutes batted (821).

=== Final ===
12–16 January
Scorecard

Mumbai	v	Uttar Pradesh
402 (131 overs); Rohit Sharma 141 (337); Bhuvneshwar Kumar 5/78 (30 overs)		245 (100.2 overs); Shivakant Shukla 99 (395); Zaheer Khan 7/54 (27.2 overs)
367 (127 overs); Vinayak Samant 113 (239); Piyush Chawla 4/94 (35 overs)		281 (71.5 overs); Bhuvneshwar Kumar 80 (132); Dhawal Kulkarni 5/76 (18.5 overs)

Mumbai won by 243 runs
Rajiv Gandhi International Stadium, Hyderabad
Umpires: Amiesh Saheba and Shavir Tarapore

- Uttar Pradesh won the toss and elected to field.
- Vinayak Samant (Mumbai) scored his first century in first-class cricket.
- Zaheer Khan (Mumbai) claimed his 500th wicket in first-class cricket.

== Records ==
- In the 2nd Semifinal, Shivakant Shukla was at the bat by 821 minutes, the fourth longest innings in first class and the second in Indian cricket, in this time he scored 178 runs at 569 balls faced for guide to Uttar Pradesh to the final.

== Statistics ==
=== Runs ===
Player	Team	Matches	Inns	NO	Runs	Balls	HS	S/Rate	100s	50s	Ave
Wasim Jaffer	Mumbai	10	16	1	1260	1814	301	64.48	4	5	84.00
Ajinkya Rahane	Mumbai	10	17	1	1089	1587	201	65.84	4	5	68.06
Cheteshwar Pujara	Saurashtra	9	13	2	906	1268	302*	71.45	4	0	82.36
Abhinav Mukund	Tamil Nadu	8	11	1	856	1391	300*	61.53	4	0	85.60
Rohit Sharma	Mumbai	10	15	1	747	1071	141	69.74	3	3	53.35
Ravindra Jadeja	Saurashtra	9	13	2	739	1196	232*	61.78	2	3	67.18
Sangram Singh	Himachal Pradesh	7	12	1	703	1117	215*	63.91	2	3	62.94
Bhavik Thaker	Gujarat	8	12	4	693	1435	192	48.29	3	1	86.62
Tanmay Srivastava	Uttar Pradesh	9	15	1	667	1381	159	48.29	2	4	47.64
Kedar Jadhav	Maharashtra	6	11	2	651	1234	114*	52.75	1	6	72.33

=== Wickets ===
Player	Team	Matches	Overs	Runs	Wickets	BBI	BBM	Econ	S/R	5+/i	10+/m	Ave.
Dhawal Kulkarni	Mumbai	9	273.3	813	42	7/50	9/86	2.97	39.0	4	0	19.35
Ravindra Jadeja	Saurashtra	9	369.3	837	42	7/31	10/88	2.26	52.7	4	1	19.92
Mohnish Parmar	Gujarat	8	341	801	41	6/51	12/104	2.34	49.9	4	1	19.53
Lakshmipathy Balaji	Tamil Nadu	7	245	630	36	6/24	9/80	2.57	40.8	4	0	17.5
Vikramjeet Malik	Himachal Pradesh	7	236.2	560	35	7/29	13/72	2.37	40.5	2	1	16.00
Siddharth Trivedi	Gujarat	8	261	649	34	5/43	9/96	2.48	46	2	0	19.08
Ramesh Powar	Mumbai	9	268.3	889	34	5/44	8/70	3.31	47.3	2	0	26.14
Ranadeb Bose	Bengal	7	208	484	33	6/62	7/41	2.33	37.8	3	0	14.67
Sunil Joshi	Karnataka	7	302.2	694	33	7/29	11/91	2.29	54.9	3	1	21.03
Samad Fallah	Maharashtra	6	252.3	807	33	6/102	8/159	3.19	45.9	4	0	24.45
