= List of Jharkhand cricketers =

This is a list of cricketers who have played first-class, List A or Twenty20 cricket for Jharkhand cricket team. Seasons given are first and last seasons; the player did not necessarily play in all the intervening seasons. Players in bold have played international cricket.

== A ==
- Varun Aaron

== D ==
- Ankit Dabas
- Kumar Deobrat
- Mahendra Singh Dhoni

== G ==
- Shiv Gautam
- Sunny Gupta

== J ==
- Ishank Jaggi

== K ==
- Ishan Kishan
- Bal Krishna
- Sumit Kumar
- Kumar Kushagra

== N ==
- Shahbaz Nadeem
- Rameez Nemat

== Q ==
- Samar Quadri

== S ==
- Rahul Shukla
- Jaskaran Singh
- Kaushal Singh
- Rituraj Singh
- Virat Singh
- Atul Singh Surwar

== T ==
- Saurabh Tiwary

== V ==
- Manish Vardhan
- Akash Verma
