= 2019–20 Irani Cup =

2022, Indian Cricket tournament

Saurashtra	Rest of India
98	374
&	&
380	105/2
- Rest of India won by 8 wickets
- Date: 1–5 October 2022
- Venue: Saurashtra Cricket Association Stadium, Rajkot
- Player of the match: Mukesh Kumar (Rest of India)
- Umpires: Saiyed Khalid and Nand Kishore

The 2019–20 Irani Cup was the 58th edition of the Irani Cup, a first-class cricket competition in India, at the end of the domestic season. It was scheduled to be played as a one-off match between Saurashtra, the winners of the 2019–20 Ranji Trophy, and a Rest of India cricket team, from 18 to 22 March 2020. Vidarbha had won the previous tournament.

On 13 March 2020, the Board of Control for Cricket in India (BCCI) announced that the match would take place behind closed doors due to the COVID-19 pandemic. The following day, the BCCI confirmed that all domestic cricket in India was suspended due to coronavirus, including the Irani Cup. However, the cancelled match was played as an opening match of the 2022–23 Irani Cup season from 1 to 5 October 2022.

== Squads ==
Saurashtra	Rest of India
Jaydev Unadkat (c)	Hanuma Vihari (c)
Parth Bhut	Mayank Agarwal
Harvik Desai	KS Bharat (wk)
Sheldon Jackson	Yash Dhull
Dharmendrasinh Jadeja	Abhimanyu Easwaran
Vishvaraj Jadeja	Yashasvi Jaiswal
Chirag Jani	Sarfaraz Khan
Kamlesh Makvana	Saurabh Kumar
Prerak Mankad	Mukesh Kumar
Kishan Parmar	Umran Malik
Snell Patel	Arzan Nagwaswalla
Kushang Patel	Priyank Panchal
Cheteshwar Pujara	Ravisrinivasan Sai Kishore
Chetan Sakariya	Kuldeep Sen
Arpit Vasavada	Jayant Yadav
Samarth Vyas	Upendra Yadav (wk)

== Match ==
1–5 October 2022 (Note: The match was originally scheduled to be played from 18 to 22 March 2020 at Saurashtra Cricket Association Stadium, but was rescheduled due to COVID-19 pandemic.)
Scorecard

(H) Saurashtra	v	Rest of India
98 (24.5 overs); Dharmendrasinh Jadeja 28 (36); Mukesh Kumar 4/23 (10 overs)		374 (110 overs); Sarfaraz Khan 138 (178); Chetan Sakariya 5/93 (28 overs)
380 (103 overs); Jaydev Unadkat 89 (133); Kuldeep Sen 5/94 (19 overs)		105/2 (31.2 overs); Abhimanyu Easwaran 63*(78); Jaydev Unadkat 2/37 (11 overs)

Rest of India won by 8 wickets
Saurashtra Cricket Association Stadium, Rajkot
Umpires: Saiyed Khalid and Nand Kishore
Player of the match: Mukesh Kumar (Rest of India)

- Rest of India won the toss and elected to field.
- The match was rescheduled to be played as an opening match of the 2022–23 Irani Cup.
