= 2012–13 Duleep Trophy =

- Dates: 6 October 2012 – 25 October 2012
- Administrator(s): BCCI
- Cricket format: First-class cricket
- Tournament format(s): Knockout
- Champions: East Zone (2nd title)
- Participants: 5
- Matches: 4
- Most runs: Shikhar Dhawan (NZ) (309)
- Most wickets: Kamlesh Makvana (WZ) (10)

The 2012–13 Duleep Trophy was the 52nd season of the Duleep Trophy, a first-class cricket tournament contested by five zonal teams of India: Central Zone, East Zone, North Zone, South Zone and West Zone.

East Zone won the final against Central Zone on first innings lead.

== Results ==
Quarterfinal
North Zone | FIL
West Zone

Semifinals
Central Zone | FIL
North Zone
South Zone
East Zone | FIL

Final
Central Zone
East Zone | FIL

=== Final ===
21–25 October 2012
Scorecard

| East Zone | v | Central Zone |
| 232 (101.5 overs); Ishank Jaggi 100*; Jalaj Saxena 5/62 | | 189 (83.5 overs); Tanmay Srivastava 94; Iresh Saxena 5/58 |
| 8/0 (5 overs); Shiv Gautam 4* |

Match drawn; East Zone won on first innings lead
M. A. Chidambaram Stadium, Chennai

- Central Zone won the toss and elected to field.
