= Sufiyan Shaikh =

Indian cricketer

Personal information
- Full name: Sufiyan Mehboob Shaikh
- Born: 25 November 1990 (age 35); Mumbai, Maharashtra, India
- Batting: Right-handed
- Bowling: Right-arm
- Role: Wicketkeeper

Domestic team information
- Years: Team
- 2014–2016: Mumbai
- FC debut: 3 February 2016 Mumbai v Jharkhand
- Last FC: 7 December 2016 Mumbai v Punjab
- LA debut: 8 November 2014 Mumbai v Saurashtra
- Last LA: 9 November 2014 Mumbai v Baroda

Career statistics
Competition	FC	LA	T20
Matches	2	2	4
Runs scored	104	58	52
Batting average	50.98	63.73	136.84
100s/50s	0/1	0/0	0/0
Top score	67	58	52
Catches/stumpings	4/3	5/0	4/1

Sufiyan Shaikh (born 25 November 1990) is an Indian cricketer. He made his debut in first-class cricket for Mumbai against Jharkhand on 3 February 2016 in 2015–16 Ranji Trophy quarter finals. Shaikh has also appeared in other major tournaments like 2010 Under-19 Cricket World Cup, 2014–15 Syed Mushtaq Ali Trophy, 2014–15 Vijay Hazare Trophy.
