= Abhijit Sarkar =

Abhijit Sarkar may refer to:

- Abhijit Sarkar (cricketer) (born 1996), Indian cricketer
- Abhijit Sarkar (footballer) (born 2000), Indian footballer
