= Mohsin Ahmedbhai Dodia =

Indian cricketer (born 1984)

Personal information
- Born: 7 June 1984 (age 42); Bhavnagar, India
- Source: ESPNcricinfo, 2 November 2015

Mohsin Ahmedbhai Dodia (born 7 June 1984) is an Indian cricketer who plays for Saurashtra. He made his first-class debut on 30 October in the 2015–16 Ranji Trophy.
