= Rohit Sharma (Jammu and Kashmir cricketer) =

Indian cricketer (born 1994)

Personal information
- Born: 5 September 1994 (age 32); Jammu, Jammu and Kashmir, India

Domestic team information
- Years: Team
- 2015–present: Jammu & Kashmir
- Source: Cricinfo, 15 October 2015

Rohit Sharma (born 5 September 1994) is an Indian cricketer who plays for Jammu & Kashmir. He made his first-class debut in the 2015–16 Ranji Trophy on 15 October 2015. He made his List A debut on 10 December 2015 in the 2015–16 Vijay Hazare Trophy. He made his Twenty20 debut on 2 January 2016 in the 2015–16 Syed Mushtaq Ali Trophy.
