= Avishek Sinha =

Indian cricketer (born 1984)

Personal information
- Born: 19 October 1984 (age 42); Siwan, Bihar, India
- Batting: Left-handed
- Bowling: Slow left arm

Domestic team information
- Years: Team
- 2007/08–2017/18: Services
- Source: ESPNcricinfo, 29 January 2017

Avishek Sinha (born 19 October 1984) is an Indian cricketer. He is a left-handed batter and slow left arm bowler. He made his first-class debut for Services in the 2008–09 Ranji Trophy on 3 November 2008.
