= Subash Chakraborty =

Indian cricketer (born 1985)

Personal information
- Born: 4 April 1985 (age 41)
- Source: Cricinfo, 13 December 2015

Subash Chakraborty (born 4 April 1985) is an Indian cricketer who plays for Tripura. He made his first-class debut on 7 November 2015 in the 2015–16 Ranji Trophy.
