= Karaparambil Monish =

Indian cricketer

Personal information
- Full name: Karaparambil Satish Monish
- Born: 8 September 1990 (age 36); Mumbai, India
- Batting: Left-handed
- Bowling: Slow left-arm orthodox
- Role: Bowler

Domestic team information
- Years: Team
- 2014–present: Kerala
- Source: ESPNcricinfo, 1 May 2021

Karaparambil Monish (born 8 September 1990) is an Indian cricketer who plays for Kerala. He is a left-arm spinner and left-arm lower order batsman.

== Career ==
He has played for Maharashtra Under-15 team and 'A' division club cricket for Karnataka Sporting Association. Later he moved to Kerala where he represented Kerala in Under-22 and later Under-25 categories before getting selected for the senior team.

Monish debuted for Kerala in 2014-15 Ranji Trophy season. He was the joint third highest wicket-taker with 49 wickets in eight games in 2015-16 Ranji Trophy thus breaking the previous Kerala record for most wickets in a Ranji season by B. Ramprakash. He made his List A debut for Kerala in the 2016–17 Vijay Hazare Trophy on 4 March 2017.

== Personal life ==
Monish was born and brought up on Mumbai. His parents Satish and Girija belong to Thrissur in Kerala. His father worked for Air India. He has an elder brother, Varun.

Monish started joining cricket coaching camps when he was around 10 years old. He got selected for MIG cricket academy in Bandra, Mumbai, where he was groomed by his first coach Satish Samanth. Initially, he started as an opening batsman but his coach thought he was a better spinner and could bat well in middle order.

In 2008, he moved to Kerala upon the advice of his brother Varun and coach for better cricketeting opportunities.
