= Sitanshu Kotak =

Indian cricketer (born 1972)

Sitanshu Hargovindbhai Kotak
Personal information
- Full name: Sitanshu Hargovindbhai Kotak
- Born: 19 October 1972 (age 54); Rajkot, Gujarat, India

Domestic team information
- Years: Team
- 1992–2012: Saurashtra

Career statistics
Competition	FC	LA	T20
Matches	130	89	9
Runs scored	8,061	3,083	133
Batting average	41.76	42.23	16.62
100s/50s	15/55	3/26	0/0
Top score	168*	122*	27
Balls bowled	4,937	1,680	12
Wickets	70	54	0
Bowling average	39.24	25.64	–
5 wickets in innings	1	1	–
10 wickets in match	0	0	–
Best bowling	6/81	7/43	–
Catches/stumpings	107/–	41/–	5/–
- Source: Cricinfo, 24 November 2014

Sitanshu Hargovindbhai Kotak (born 19 October 1972) is an Indian retired first-class cricketer and coach.

== Playing career ==
A left-handed batsman, he has been a prolific run scorer for Saurashtra. He scored 8061 runs in 130 first class match with average of 41.76. He also took 70 wickets while playing for Saurastra.

== Coaching career ==
As head coach, He led Saurashtra to the victory in the 2020 Ranji Trophy Final. After the appointment of Rahul Dravid as the head of the National Cricket Academy in August 2019, Kotak was appointed as Dravid's successor as the head coach of the India A team.

In Jan 2025, he was added as the batting coach of the senior Indian cricket team for the limited overs series against England at Home.
