= Sayan Ghosh =

Indian cricketer (born 1992)

Personal information
- Full name: Sayan Sankar Ghosh
- Born: 16 September 1992 (age 34); Nadia, West Bengal, India
- Bowling: Right-arm medium

Domestic team information
- Years: Team
- 2014–present: Bengal
- 2017: Kolkata Knight Riders
- 2018: Delhi Capitals
- Source: Cricinfo, 12 December 2015

Sayan Ghosh (Bengali: সায়ন ঘোষ; born 16 September 1992) is an Indian cricketer who plays for Bengal. He made his first-class debut on 7 November 2015 in the 2015–16 Ranji Trophy. In February 2017, he was bought by the Kolkata Knight Riders team for the 2017 Indian Premier League for 10 lakhs. In January 2018, he was bought by the Delhi Capitals in the 2018 IPL auction.

== See also ==
- List of Bengal cricketers
