= Pranav Gupta =

Indian cricketer (born 1993)

Personal information
- Full name: Pranav Gupta
- Born: 18 December 1993 (age 32); Jammu, India
- Bowling: Legbreak googly
- Source: Cricinfo, 21 November 2020

Pranav Gupta (born 18 December 1993) is an Indian cricketer who plays for Jammu and Kashmir. He made his first-class debut on 23 November 2015 in the 2015–16 Ranji Trophy. In December 2018, he was one of six cricketers for Jammu and Kashmir to be included in the auction ahead of the 2019 Indian Premier League.
