= Samad Bhat =

Indian cricketer (born 1995)

Personal information
- Born: 2 October 1995 (age 31); Srinagar, India
- Source: Cricinfo, 11 October 2015

Samad Bhat (born 2 October 1995) is an Indian cricketer who plays for Jammu & Kashmir. He made his first-class debut on 1 October 2015 in the 2015–16 Ranji Trophy.
