= Raushan Raj =

Indian cricketer (born 1984)

Personal information
- Full name: Raushan Ramroop Raj
- Born: 12 February 1984 (age 42); Chhapra, India
- Source: Cricinfo, 11 October 2015

Raushan Raj (born 12 February 1984) is an Indian cricketer who plays for Services. He made his first-class debut on 1 October 2015 in the 2015–16 Ranji Trophy.
