= Umar Nissar =

Indian cricketer (born 1993)

Personal information
- Full name: Umar Nissar Mir
- Born: 2 May 1993 (age 33); Baramulla, India
- Batting: Right-handed
- Bowling: Right-arm off break

Domestic team information
- Years: Team
- 2015–16: Jammu and Kashmir
- Source: Cricinfo, 13 December 2015

Umar Nissar (born 2 May 1993) is an Indian cricketer who played for Jammu and Kashmir. He made his first-class debut on 1 December 2015 in the 2015–16 Ranji Trophy. He made his List A debut for Jammu and Kashmir in the 2017–18 Vijay Hazare Trophy on 6 February 2018.
