= Poonam Poonia =

Indian cricketer (born 1994)

Personal information
- Full name: Poonam Subhash Poonia
- Born: 12 December 1994 (age 31); Sri Ganganagar, India
- Source: Cricinfo, 11 October 2015

Poonam Subhash Poonia (born 12 December 1994) is an Indian cricketer who plays for Services. He made his first-class debut on 1 October 2015 in the 2015–16 Ranji Trophy. He made his List A debut for Services in the 2016–17 Vijay Hazare Trophy on 25 February 2017.
