= Tapash Mandal =

Indian cricketer (born 1997)

Personal information
- Full name: Tapash Ratan Mandal
- Born: 26 December 1997 (age 28); Konaban, Tripura, India
- Source: Cricinfo, 2 November 2015

Tapash Mandal (born 26 December 1997) is an Indian cricketer who plays for Tripura. He made his first-class debut on 30 October in the 2015–16 Ranji Trophy.
