= Vandit Jivrajani =

Indian cricketer (born 1991)

Personal information
- Full name: Vandit Mukeshbhai Jivrajani
- Born: 3 September 1991 (age 35); Rajkot, Gujarat, India
- Source: Cricinfo, 13 December 2015

Vandit Jivrajani (born 3 September 1991) is an Indian cricketer who plays for Saurashtra. He made his first-class debut on 23 November 2015 in the 2015–16 Ranji Trophy. He made his Twenty20 debut on 9 November 2019, for Saurashtra in the 2019–20 Syed Mushtaq Ali Trophy.
