= Avi Barot =

Indian cricketer (1992–2021)

Personal information
- Born: 25 June 1992; Ahmedabad, Gujarat, India
- Died: 15 October 2021 (aged 29); Ahmedabad, Gujarat, India
- Batting: Right-handed
- Bowling: Right arm off-break
- Role: Batsman

Career statistics
Competition	FC	LA	T20
Matches	38	38	20
Runs scored	1,547	1,030	717
Batting average	24.95	28.61	37.73
100s/50s	1/9	0/8	1/5
Top score	130	91*	122
Balls bowled	90	13	18
Wickets	0	0	1
Bowling average	–	–	31.00
5 wickets in innings	–	–	0
10 wickets in match	–	–	0
Best bowling	–	–	1/31
Catches/stumpings	50/2	24/5	6/–
- Source: ESPNcricinfo, 16 October 2021

Avi Barot (25 June 1992 – 15 October 2021) was an Indian cricketer who played for Saurashtra. He played 38 first-class matches, 38 List A matches, and 20 Twenty20 matches during his career, including 21 matches in the Ranji Trophy, 17 List A and 11 domestic T20 matches for Saurashtra. He played as a right-handed wicket-keeper-batsman and scored 1,547 runs, 1,030 runs and 717 runs in first-class, List-A and T20 respectively.

Barot died on 15 October 2021 in Ahmedabad, from a cardiac arrest. He was 29.
