= Ahmed Farzeen =

Indian cricketer (born 1992)

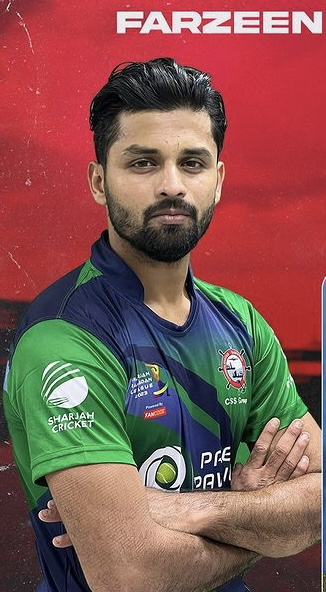

Personal information
- Full name: C.O.T Ahmed Farzeen
- Born: 10 January 1992 (age 34); Thalassery, Kannur, Kerala
- Batting: Right-handed
- Bowling: Right-arm fast medium
- Role: Bowler

Domestic team information
- Years: Team
- 2015 - present: Kerala
- Source: ESPNcricinfo, 11 October 2015

Ahmed Farzeen (born 10 January 1992) is an Indian first-class cricketer who plays for Kerala. He is a right-handed fast medium bowler and a right-handed lower order batsman.

== Career ==
Ahmed was born in Thalassery to T. N Savan and Amina Beevi. He made his first-class cricket debut for Kerala against Jammu and Kashmir on 1 October 2015 in 2015-16 Ranji Trophy. It was his performances in C.K Nayudu Trophy that paved way to his Ranji Trophy debut. He is included in the 14-man squad of KCA Tuskers for 2020–21 KCA President's Cup T20.
