= Diwesh Pathania =

Indian cricketer (born 1989)

Personal information
- Full name: Diwesh Gurdev Pathania
- Born: 22 June 1989 (age 37); Pathankot, Punjab, India
- Source: ESPNcricinfo, 11 October 2015

Diwesh Pathania (born 22 June 1989) is an Indian cricketer who plays for Services. He made his List A debut on 27 February 2014, for Services in the 2013–14 Vijay Hazare Trophy. He made his first class debut on 1 October 2015 in the 2015–16 Ranji Trophy. He made his Twenty20 debut for Services in the 2016–17 Inter State Twenty-20 Tournament on 29 January 2017.

He was the leading wicket-taker for Services in the 2017–18 Ranji Trophy, with 28 dismissals in six matches. In June 2018, he was awarded with the Lala Amarnath Award For Best Allrounder In Domestic Limited-Overs award by the Board of Control for Cricket in India (BCCI).

He was the leading wicket-taker for Services in the 2018–19 Vijay Hazare Trophy, with fifteen dismissals in seven matches. He was also the leading wicket-taker for Services in the 2018–19 Ranji Trophy, with 40 dismissals in nine matches.

In August 2019, he was named in the India Blue team's squad for the 2019–20 Duleep Trophy. In October 2019, he was named in India C's squad for the 2019–20 Deodhar Trophy.
