= Swapan Das =

Indian cricketer (born 1990)

Personal information
- Born: 12 September 1990 (age 36); Sonamura, Tripura, India
- Source: Cricinfo, 11 October 2015

Swapan Das (born 12 September 1990) is an Indian first-class cricketer who plays for Tripura.
