= Varun Aaron =

Indian cricketer (born 1989)

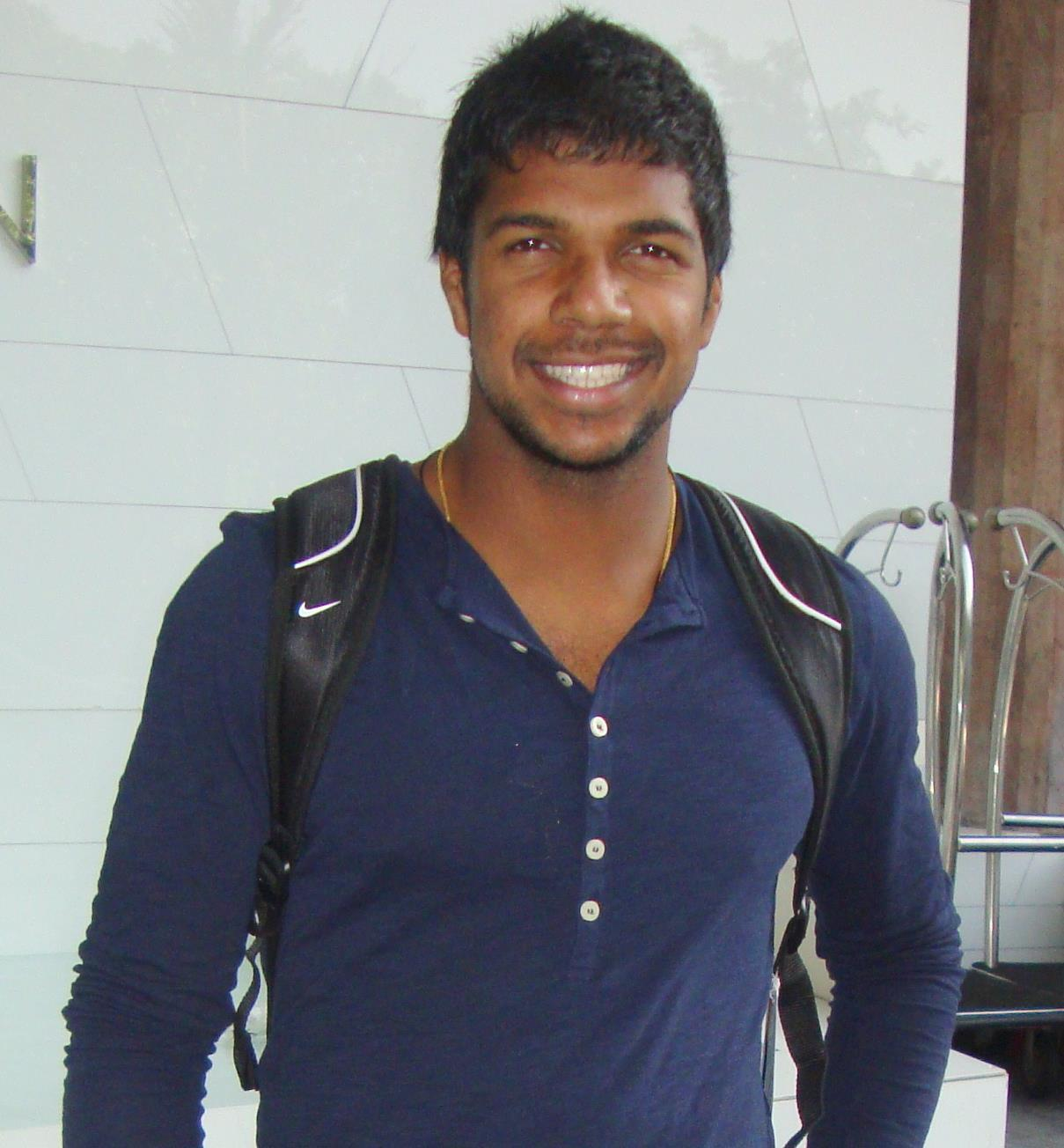

Personal information
- Full name: Varun Raymond Aaron
- Born: 29 October 1989 (age 37); Singhbhum district, Bihar, (now Jharkhand), India
- Nickname: Roon
- Height: 6 ft 0 in (183 cm)
- Batting: Right-handed
- Bowling: Right-arm fast
- Role: Bowler

International information
- National side: India (2011–2015)
- Test debut (cap 273): 22 November 2011 v West Indies
- Last Test: 14 November 2015 v South Africa
- ODI debut (cap 192): 23 October 2011 v England
- Last ODI: 2 November 2014 v Sri Lanka
- ODI shirt no.: 77

Domestic team information
- Years: Team
- 2008/09–2021/22: Jharkhand
- 2011–2012: Delhi Daredevils (squad no. 77)
- 2014–2016: Royal Challengers Bangalore (squad no. 45)
- 2014: Durham
- 2017: Kings XI Punjab (squad no. 77)
- 2018: Leicestershire (squad no. 11)
- 2019–2020: Rajasthan Royals (squad no. 77)
- 2022: Gujarat Titans
- 2022/23: Baroda
- 2023/24: Jharkhand

Career statistics
Competition	Test	ODI	FC	LA
Matches	9	9	66	88
Runs scored	35	8	837	326
Batting average	3.88	8.00	10.59	10.51
100s/50s	0/0	0/0	0/1	0/0
Top score	9	6*	72	34
Balls bowled	1,189	380	9,945	4,115
Wickets	18	11	173	141
Bowling average	52.61	38.09	33.27	26.47
5 wickets in innings	0	0	6	4
10 wickets in match	0	0	0	0
Best bowling	3/97	3/24	6/32	6/33
Catches/stumpings	1/–	1/–	12/–	14/–
Medal record
Men's Cricket
Representing India
ICC T20 World Cup
Runner-up	2014 Bangladesh
- Source: ESPNcricinfo, 19 February 2024

Varun Raymond Aaron (born 29 October 1989) is an Indian former cricketer from Jamshedpur. A right-arm fast bowler, he first played for Jharkhand U-19 followed by Jharkhand Ranji team. He played his first One Day International (ODI) for India in October 2011 and made his Test debut the following month.

== Domestic career ==
Aaron is a product of the MRF Pace Foundation. He made his first-class debut playing for Jharkhand in the 2008–09 season of the Ranji Trophy, in a home fixture against Jammu and Kashmir. He claimed two wickets in each innings.

Aaron took 13 wickets in the 2010–11 Ranji Trophy and bowled a 153.4 km/h (95.3 mph) delivery. He was part of the India Emerging Players squad that went to Australia in 2011, and after impressing there earned a call-up to the India ODI squad for the series in England. He was part of the India Emerging Players squad that went to Australia in 2011, and after impressing there earned a call-up to the Indian T20 and ODI squad for the series in England as a replacement for Ishant Sharma.

In September 2014, he was signed by the Durham County Cricket Club for the 2014 County Championship.

In February 2017, he was bought by the Kings XI Punjab team for the 2017 Indian Premier League for 2.8 crores. In October 2018, he was named in India B's squad for the 2018–19 Deodhar Trophy.

In December 2018, he was bought by the Rajasthan Royals in the player auction for the 2019 Indian Premier League.

In August 2019, he was named in the India Red team's squad for the 2019–20 Duleep Trophy. In February 2022, he was bought by the Gujarat Titans in the auction for the 2022 Indian Premier League tournament.

Aaron announced his retirement from the first-class format in February 2024. He cited that his "body won't allow me to continue bowling fast in red-ball cricket, so I have decided to quit." He finished with 173 wickets at an average of 33.27.

== International career ==
=== ODI career ===
Aaron only bowled 3 overs in his second match against England at Eden Gardens and took 1 wicket (again bowled) of Alastair Cook which proved to be a key strike for India.

On 25 January 2014, Aaron made his international comeback after 2 years, having previously suffered from a back injury. He returned figures of 1/52.

== Coaching career ==
He was appointed as fast bowling coach for Sunrisers Hyderabad in July 2025.
