= Muzzaffaruddin Khalid =

Indian cricketer (born 1990)

Personal information
- Full name: Muzzaffaruddin Khalid Ahmed
- Born: 25 November 1990 (age 35); Meerut, Uttar Pradesh, India
- Batting: Right-handed
- Bowling: Legbreak googly

Domestic team information
- Years: Team
- Services
- Source: ESPNcricinfo, 11 October 2015

Muzzaffaruddin Khalid (born 25 November 1990) is an Indian first-class cricketer who played for Services.
