= Gauresh Gawas =

Indian cricketer (born 1990)

Personal information
- Full name: Mahadev Gauresh Gawas
- Born: 8 December 1990 (age 35)
- Source: ESPNcricinfo, 10 October 2015

Gauresh Gawas (born 8 December 1990) is an Indian first-class cricketer who plays for Goa.
