= Zahoor Sofi =

Indian cricketer (born 1987)

Personal information
- Full name: Zahoor Ahmed Sofi
- Born: 2 May 1987 (age 39); Srinagar, India
- Source: Cricinfo, 11 October 2015

Zahoor Sofi (born 2 May 1987) is an Indian first-class cricketer who played for Jammu & Kashmir. He played in six first-class, seventeen List A and five Twenty20 matches between 2008 and 2016. Following his playing career, he became a member of the organising committee for cricket trials in Kashmir.
