= Chandrakant Sakure =

Indian cricketer (born 1990)

Personal information
- Born: 9 July 1990 (age 36); Seoni, Madhya Pradesh, India
- Source: ESPNcricinfo, 24 February 2016

Chandrakant Sakure (born 9 July 1990) is an Indian cricketer who played for Madhya Pradesh. On 3 February 2016 he made his first-class debut in the 2015–16 Ranji Trophy. He made his Twenty20 debut for Madhya Pradesh in the 2016–17 Inter State Twenty-20 Tournament on 3 February 2017.

He was the leading wicket-taker for Madhya Pradesh in the 2018–19 Vijay Hazare Trophy, with twelve dismissals in five matches.

Ahead of the 2018–19 Ranji Trophy, he transferred from Madhya Pradesh to Railways.
