= Arindam Das =

Indian cricketer (born 1981)

Personal information
- Full name: Arindam Shibendranarayan Das
- Born: 16 October 1981 (age 45); Calcutta, Bengal, India
- Batting: Right-handed
- Bowling: Right-arm medium
- Role: Opening batsman

Domestic team information
- Years: Team
- 2001/02–present: Bengal

Career statistics
Competition	FC	List A	T20
Matches	80	29	2
Runs scored	4397	1031	83
Batting average	36.04	36.82	83.00
100s/50s	10/22	0/8	0/0
Top score	215*	78	42
Catches/stumpings	79/–	11/–	2/–
- Source: ESPNcricinfo, 6 January 2014

Arindam Shibendranarayan Das (born 16 October 1981) is an Indian cricketer who plays for Bengal in domestic cricket. He is a right-hand opening batsman. In February 2001, Das played two ODIs for the India Under-19 cricket team against England Under-19 cricket team.
