= Rohan Prem =

Indian cricketer (born 1986)

Personal information
- Full name: Prembhastin Rohan Prem
- Born: 13 September 1986 (age 40); Thiruvananthapuram, Kerala, India
- Batting: Left-handed
- Bowling: Right-arm off-break
- Role: Batsman

Domestic team information
- Years: Team
- 2005–present: Kerala
- 2024–: Trivandrum Royals

Career statistics
Competition	FC	List A	T20
Matches	90	63	57
Runs scored	4821	1726	1275
Batting average	38.56	31.38	28.33
100s/50s	12/21	3/11	0/6
Top score	208	114	92*
Balls bowled	3922	1018	264
Wickets	53	17	11
Bowling average	35.45	50.29	25.54
5 wickets in innings	0	0	0
10 wickets in match	0	0	0
Best bowling	4/44	2/23	2/14
Catches/stumpings	41/0	18/0	16/0
- Source: Cricinfo, 13 December 2021

Rohan Prem (born 13 September 1986) is an Indian cricketer who plays domestic cricket for Kerala in domestic cricket. He is a left-handed middle order batsman and off-spin bowler.

== Early and personal life ==
Rohan hails from Kannammoola in Thiruvananthapuram district of Kerala. His father T. Prembhastin was an employee at a private firm in Thiruvananthapuram and his mother is Jacqueline. His first coach was Sreekumar, a trainer at the Sports Council. He is married to Anju.

== Domestic career ==
He made his first-class debut against Rajasthan at Jaipur in 2005. He scored three centuries during the 2008–09 season of the Ranji Trophy Plate League. He was the captain of the Kerala cricket team the 2016–17 Ranji Trophy. He is the first Kerala cricketer to score 4000 Runs in First class cricket.

In August 2018, he was one of five players that were suspended for three games in the 2018–19 Vijay Hazare Trophy, after showing dissent against Kerala's captain, Sachin Baby.
