= Chetan Sakariya =

Indian cricketer (born 1998)

Personal information
- Born: 28 February 1998 (age 28); Bhavnagar, Gujarat, India
- Batting: Left-handed
- Bowling: Left-arm medium-fast

International information
- National side: India (2021)
- Only ODI (cap 240): 23 July 2021 v Sri Lanka
- ODI shirt no.: 55
- T20I debut (cap 91): 28 July 2021 v Sri Lanka
- Last T20I: 29 July 2021 v Sri Lanka
- T20I shirt no.: 55

Domestic team information
- Years: Team
- 2018–present: Saurashtra
- 2021: Rajasthan Royals
- 2022–2023: Delhi Capitals
- 2025: Kolkata Knight Riders
- Source: ESPNcricinfo, 29 July 2021

Chetan Sakariya (born 28 February 1998) is an Indian international cricketer who has played for Indian cricket team, and currently plays for Saurashtra in domestic cricket. He made his international debut for the India cricket team in July 2021.

== Early and personal life ==
Sakariya hails from a village called Vartej located 15 km from Bhavnagar in the state of Gujarat. Sheldon Jackson, a senior player in the Saurashtra team, bought him a new shoe and helped him train. Only then did Sakariya get the chance to go to the MRF Pace Foundation. Jackson and Sakariya then became close friends.

Sakariya's brother committed suicide when he was playing Syed Mushtaq Ali Trophy 2021. Sakariya was very close to his brother and keeping this in mind, Rajasthan Royals gifted him a jersey which has initials of his late brother 'R.K' imprinted on it. The jersey also has a message written on it that says, "Miss you bro".

On 9 May 2021, Sakariya's father died of COVID-19.

== Career ==
Sakariya made his List A debut for Saurashtra in the 2017–18 Vijay Hazare Trophy on 22 February 2018. He made his first-class debut for Saurashtra in the 2018–19 Ranji Trophy on 20 November 2018, taking a five-wicket haul in the first innings. He made his Twenty20 debut for Saurashtra in the 2018–19 Syed Mushtaq Ali Trophy on 21 February 2019. In February 2021, Sakariya was bought by the Rajasthan Royals for 1.2 crores in the IPL auction ahead of the 2021 Indian Premier League.

In June 2021, Sakariya was named in India's One Day International (ODI) and Twenty20 International (T20I) squads for their series against Sri Lanka. He made his ODI debut on 23 July 2021, for India against Sri Lanka. His maiden international wicket was Bhanuka Rajapaksa, and he finished with figures of 2 for 38. He made his T20I debut on 28 July 2021, for India against Sri Lanka.

In February 2022, he was bought by the Delhi Capitals in the auction for the 2022 Indian Premier League tournament.
