= Akshay Kodoth =

Indian cricketer (born 1992)

Personal information
- Full name: Akshay Gopalkrishna Kodoth
- Born: 20 March 1992 (age 34); Kollam, Kerala, India
- Batting: Right-handed
- Role: Wicket-keeper batsman

Domestic team information
- Years: Team
- 2010–2015: Kerala

Career statistics
Competition	FC	LA
Matches	18	13
Runs scored	470	104
Batting average	20.43	13.00
100s/50s	0/2	0/0
Top score	72	30*
Catches/stumpings	32/11	12/1
- Source: ESPNcricinfo, 11 October 2015

Akshay Kodoth (born 20 March 1992) is an Indian cricketer who played for Kerala in domestic cricket.

== Early life ==
Akshay was born in Kollam and was brought up in Bengaluru where his father Gopalkrishna worked. He attended the Roger Binny Cricket Academy as a 10-year old.

He studied Bcom at Jain University, Bengaluru where he was teammates with K. L. Rahul, Karun Nair and Manish Pandey.

== Career ==
Akshay first represented Kerala in U-17 level. He made his List A debut on 10 February 2010 in the Vijay Hazare Trophy. He scored 451 runs in six matches with a hundred and three half-centuries in the 2014 C. K. Nayudu Trophy while leading Kerala under-23 team to elite group semifinals. He made his first-class debut for Kerala on 17 November 2011 against Tripura in the 2011–12 Ranji Trophy. He has played for Mysuru Warriors in Karnataka Premier League.

On 2017, he signed to play for Ivanhoe. He signed to play for Camberwell Magpies Cricket Club on Premier League 2019–20.
