= Samarth Vyas =

Indian cricketer (born 1995)

Personal information
- Full name: Samarth Bipin Vyas
- Born: 28 November 1995 (age 30); Rajkot, Gujarat, India
- Batting: Right-handed
- Bowling: Legbreak googly
- Role: All-rounder

Domestic team information
- Years: Team
- 2015–present: Saurashtra
- Source: Cricinfo, 13 December 2015

Samarth Bipin Vyas (born 28 November 1995) is an Indian cricketer who plays for Saurashtra. He made his first-class debut on 23 November 2015 in the 2015–16 Ranji Trophy. He was bought by Sunrisers Hyderabad for Rs. 20 Lakh, in the 2023 Indian Premier League auction. He was released by Sunrisers Hyderabad in November 2023 after just one season.
