= Shubham Chaubey =

Indian cricketer (born 1995)

Personal information
- Born: 15 October 1995 (age 31); Varanasi, Uttar Pradesh, India
- Source: ESPNcricinfo, 20 November 2016

Shubham Chaubey (born 15 October 1995) is an Indian cricketer. He made his Twenty20 debut for Uttar Pradesh in the 2015–16 Syed Mushtaq Ali Trophy on 8 January 2016.
