= Rahul Keni =

Indian cricketer

Personal information
- Full name: Rahul Keni
- Born: Goa
- Batting: Left-handed
- Role: Wicketkeeper
- Source: ESPNcricinfo, 6 December 2022

Rahul Keni is an Indian first-class cricketer. He was part of the Goa cricket team as a wicket-keeper-batsman. He also played for the India under-19s. He scored his only first-class century in 2010 against Rajasthan at Sawai Mansingh Stadium in which he struck 20 fours in his unbeaten 115.
