= Saurabh Das =

Indian cricketer (born 1993)

Personal information
- Full name: Saurabh Shankar Das
- Born: 1 November 1993 (age 33); Bamothia, Tripura, India
- Batting: Right handed
- Bowling: Right arm offbreak

Domestic team information
- Years: Team
- 2013–14: Tripura
- Source: Cricinfo, 11 October 2015

Saurabh Das (born 1 November 1993) is an Indian first-class cricketer who plays for Tripura. He made his List A debut on 27 February 2014, for Tripura in the 2013–14 Vijay Hazare Trophy.
