= Kaushal Acharjee =

Indian cricketer (born 1990)

Personal information
- Full name: Kaushal Kushmohan Acharjee
- Born: 30 December 1990 (age 35); Abhoynagar, Agartala, Tripura, India
- Batting: Right-handed
- Bowling: Right-arm Medium

Domestic team information
- Years: Team
- 2015: Tripura
- Source: ESPNcricinfo, 11 October 2015

Kaushal Acharjee (born 30 December 1990) is an Indian first-class cricketer who plays for Tripura.
