= Ian Dev Singh =

Indian cricketer

Personal information
- Full name: Ian Dev Singh Chauhan
- Born: 1 March 1989 (age 37); Gandhi Nagar, Jammu
- Nickname: IC
- Batting: Right-handed
- Bowling: Right-arm off-break
- Role: Top order Batsman, wicketkeeper

Domestic team information
- Years: Team
- 2006/07–2023: Jammu and Kashmir
- 2013/14: Duleep Trophy
- 2023-2024: Seattle Thunderbolts

Career statistics
Competition	FC	LA	T20
Matches	93	72	48
Runs scored	5558	1627	876
Batting average	37.55	24.28	19.90
100s/50s	17/24	2/9	0/2
Top score	170	112	75*
Balls bowled	294	149	25
Wickets	2	2	1
Bowling average	87.00	77.00	38.00
5 wickets in innings	0	0	0
10 wickets in match	0	0	0
Best bowling	1/16	2/44	1/14
Catches/stumpings	84/1	30/3	26/2
- Source: ESPNcricinfo, 28 April 2017

Ian Dev Singh Chauhan is an Indian cricketer who plays predominantly as a batsman. He was captain of the Jammu and Kashmir in the Ranji Trophy in 2013-14. Recently he moved to the United States and was made captain for the Seattle Thunderbolts for the MiLC 2024 season.

== Early life ==
Ian Dev Singh was born in Gandhinagar, Jammu into a Rajput family and named after Ian Botham and Kapil Dev, his father's two favorite cricketers. He completed his Bachelor of Engineering degree at D. Y. Patil University in Navi Mumbai while simultaneously playing Ranji Trophy cricket, occasionally necessitating flying in to sit an exam directly between Jammu and Kashmir fixtures.

== Career ==
Jammu and Kashmir's cricketing infrastructure remains somewhat underdeveloped, and Ian Dev Singh developed as a cricketer by playing club cricket in Mumbai. He noted in 2012 that, '[t]he competition even at the club level [in Mumbai] is very tough whereas back in our state, we get limited opportunities. We rarely get solid preparation before the Ranji season commences.'

Another major influence on the development of his game was former India captain Bishan Bedi, coach of Jammu and Kashmir between 2011 and 2014. With Bedi's guidance helping him overhaul his mental approach to batting, Dev Singh scored 406 runs at 67.66 in first-class matches in 2011–12, and earned selection for North Zone in the Duleep Trophy. For his part, Bedi described Dev Singh as 'a very good shorter version batsman and a brilliant fielder' who was 'definitely ready for a break', either in the form of an international call-up or an IPL contract. As of 2017, however, such honours have eluded him.
