= Shaurya Sanandia =

Indian cricketer (born 1987)

Personal information
- Born: 24 April 1987 (age 39); Rajkot, India
- Bowling: Right-arm medium
- Role: Bowler

Domestic team information
- Years: Team
- 2008-Present: Saurashtra
- Source: Cricinfo, 10 January 2016

Shaurya Sanandia (born 24 April 1987) is an Indian cricketer who plays for Saurashtra. He made his Twenty20 debut on 2 January 2016 in the 2015–16 Syed Mushtaq Ali Trophy.
