= Vinayak Vikram =

Indian cricketer (born 1997)

Personal information
- Born: 18 November 1997 (age 28); Khunti, Jharkhand, India
- Source: Cricinfo, 11 October 2015

Vinayak Vikram (born 18 November 1997) is an Indian first class cricketer who plays for Jharkhand.
