= Sagar Jogiyani =

Indian cricketer (born 1984)

Personal information
- Full name: Sagar Dipakbhai Jogiyani
- Born: 20 June 1984 (age 42); Gondal, Gujarat, India
- Batting: Right-handed
- Role: Wicket-keeper

Domestic team information
- Years: Team
- 2004–2016: Saurashtra

Career statistics
Competition	FC	LA	T20
Matches	96	45	19
Runs scored	4,697	1,122	273
Batting average	32.39	26.71	16.05
100s/50s	8/18	2/7	0/1
Top score	282	106	55
Catches/stumpings	264/37	49/17	17/5
- Source: Cricinfo, 28 August 2024

Sagar Dipakbhai Jogiyani (born 20 June 1984) is an Indian former cricketer. He was a right-handed opening batsman and wicket-keeper. He represented Saurashtra in first-class cricket, limited overs and Twenty20 cricket.

Jogiyani made his highest first-class score of 282 against Gujarat in November 2012, batting alongside Ravindra Jadeja they added 539, surpassing the Ranji Trophy record for the third wicket.
