= Amit Yadav =

Indian cricketer (born 1989)

Personal information
- Full name: Amit Ramkumar Yadav
- Born: 10 October 1989 (age 37); Khar Khari, Goa, India
- Batting: Right-handed
- Bowling: Right-arm off break
- Role: Bowling all-rounder

Domestic team information
- Years: Team
- 2006/07–2022/23: Goa

Career statistics
Competition	FC	LA	T20
Matches	40	40	48
Runs scored	1,008	536	333
Batting average	21.91	19.14	11.89
100s/50s	0/6	1/0	0/0
Top score	68	119	38*
Balls bowled	8,094	1,938	949
Wickets	131	37	46
Bowling average	28.52	42.08	22.30
5 wickets in innings	4	0	0
10 wickets in match	0	0	0
Best bowling	7/68	3/22	4/12
Catches/stumpings	22/–	12/–	18/–
- Source: ESPNcricinfo, 10 March 2025

Amit Ramkumar Yadav (born 10 October 1989) is an Indian former cricketer who played for Goa cricket team. He is an all-rounder who bats right-handed and bowls right-arm off breaks. He made his first-class cricket debut for Goa in 2009/10. In 2012, he was involved in the IPL spot-fixing case when he was a member of the Kings XI Punjab squad. He was banned from playing cricket for one year, and returned to domestic cricket in the 2013/14 season.
