= Shashaank Sharma =

Indian cricketer (born 1992)

Personal information
- Full name: Shashaank Narantak Sharma
- Born: 7 September 1992 (age 34); Kullu Himachal Pradesh, India
- Batting: Left-handed
- Role: Wicketkeeper

Domestic team information
- Years: Team
- 2013/14: Himachal Pradesh
- Source: Cricinfo, 11 October 2015

Shashaank Sharma (born 7 September 1992) is an Indian cricketer who plays for Services. He made his first-class debut on 22 December 2013 in the 2013–14 Ranji Trophy, for Himachal Pradesh.
