= Sagun Kamat =

Indian cricketer (born 1983)

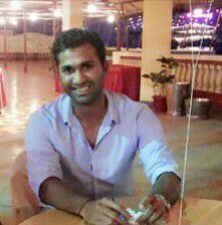

Personal information
- Full name: Sagun Krishna Kamat
- Born: 11 May 1983 (age 43); Ribandar, Goa, India
- Source: Cricinfo, 10 October 2015

Sagun Krishna Kamat (born 11 May 1983) is an Indian first-class cricketer who plays for Goa. On 21 October 2016, he scored 304 not out for Goa against Services in the 2016–17 Ranji Trophy. He became the first batsman for Goa to score a triple century.

== See also ==
- List of Ranji Trophy triple centuries
