= Dharmendrasinh Jadeja =

Indian cricketer (born 1990)

Personal information
- Full name: Dharmendrasinh Aniruddsinh Jadeja
- Born: 4 August 1990 (age 36); Rajkot, Gujarat, India
- Batting: Left-handed
- Bowling: Slow left-arm orthodox
- Role: All-rounder

Domestic team information
- Years: Team
- 2012-2026: Saurashtra
- 2026-present: Chhattisgarh
- Source: ESPNcricinfo, 16 October 2015

Dharmendrasinh Aniruddsinh Jadeja (born 4 August 1990) is an Indian first-class cricketer who plays for Chhattisgarh in domestic cricket.

He was the leading wicket-taker for Saurashtra in the 2017–18 Ranji Trophy, with 34 dismissals in six matches. He was also the leading wicket-taker for Saurashtra in the group-stage of the 2018–19 Ranji Trophy, with 38 dismissals in eight matches. In January 2019, he became the first bowler for Saurashtra to take 50 wickets in a Ranji Trophy season.

In August 2019, he was named in the India Green team's squad for the 2019–20 Duleep Trophy.
