= Shadab Nazar =

Indian cricketer (born 1987)

Personal information
- Born: 14 June 1987 (age 39); Bijnor, India
- Source: Cricinfo, 11 October 2015

Shadab Nazar (born 14 June 1987) is an Indian first-class cricketer who plays for Services.
