= Parvinder Singh =

Indian cricketer (born 1981)

Personal information
- Full name: Parvinder Singh
- Born: 8 December 1981 (age 44); Meerut, Uttar Pradesh, India
- Nickname: Parry
- Batting: Right-handed
- Bowling: Right arm medium
- Role: Batsman

Domestic team information
- Years: Team
- 2000–present: Uttar Pradesh

Career statistics
| Competition | FC | LA | T20 |
|---|---|---|---|
| Matches | 49 | 36 | 10 |
| Runs scored | 2752 | 952 | 226 |
| Batting average | 35.74 | 36.61 | 28.25 |
| 100s/50s | 8/12 | 1/5 | 0/2 |
| Top score | 203* | 102 | 52* |
| Balls bowled | 624 | 216 | 42 |
| Wickets | 5 | 6 | 1 |
| Bowling average | 70.80 | 30.33 | 48.00 |
| 5 wickets in innings | 0 | 0 | 0 |
| 10 wickets in match | 0 | 0 | 0 |
| Best bowling | 3/46 | 2/14 | 1/17 |
| Catches/stumpings | 25/– | 6/– | 1/0 |
- Source: Cricinfo, 16 January 2013

Parvinder Singh (born 8 December 1981) is a cricketer who plays for Uttar Pradesh in Indian domestic cricket. He is a right-hand batsman and occasional medium pace bowler.
