= Umesh Dubey =

Indian cricket umpire (born 1962)

Personal information
- Full name: Umesh L Dubey
- Born: 10 December 1962 (age 63); Mumbai, India

Umpiring information
- WODIs umpired: 1 (2015)
- WT20Is umpired: 4 (2014–2015)
- Source: Cricket Archive, 15 November 2016

Umesh Dubey (born 10 December 1962) is an Indian cricket umpire. He has stood in 1999–00 Ranji Trophy game. He has also stood in Road Safety World Series.
