= Rahul Shukla =

Indian cricketer (born 1990)

Personal information
- Full name: Rahul Artiprasad Shukla
- Born: 28 August 1990 (age 36); Jharkhand, India
- Height: 6 ft 0 in (1.83 m)
- Batting: Right-handed
- Bowling: Right-arm medium
- Role: Bowler

Domestic team information
- Years: Team
- 2009–present: Jharkhand
- 2010–2012: Mumbai Indians
- 2013: Rajasthan Royals
- 2014: Delhi Daredevils

Career statistics
Competition	FC	LA	T20
Matches	38	69	54
Runs scored	494	416	79
Batting average	13.35	16.64	8.77
100s/50s	0/2	0/1	0/0
Top score	85*	50	17*
Balls bowled	6,186	3,348	1,091
Wickets	112	111	60
Bowling average	29.922	26.42	25.36
5 wickets in innings	6	3	1
10 wickets in match	0	0	0
Best bowling	7/106	6/33	5/36
Catches/stumpings	25/–	22/–	24/–
- Source: ESPNcricinfo, 16 March 2022

Rahul Artiprasad Shukla (born 28 August 1990) is an Indian first-class cricketer from Jaunpur district who plays for Jharkhand in domestic cricket. He is a right-arm fast-medium bowler. He was part of the Mumbai Indians squad from 2010 to 2012. He was signed up by the Rajasthan Royals in 2013.

In a match played between Rajasthan Royals and Otago Volts in CLT20 on 1 October 2013, he was named man of the match for taking 3 wickets. In February 2019, in the 2018–19 Syed Mushtaq Ali Trophy, he took his first five-wicket haul in a T20 match.
