= Bhavin Thakkar =

Indian cricketer (born 1982)

Bhavin Jitendra Thakkar (born 22 January 1982, in Mumbai, Maharashtra) is an Indian cricketer.

Thakkar last played a first-class game in 2010 for Himachal Pradesh. He has played 37 first-class games in all scoring 1924 runs at 35.62, with five tons and 10 fifties. Before Himachal, Thakkar had played for Mumbai. He signed for Jharkhand in the 2013/14 season.
