= Deepak Punia (cricketer) =

Indian cricketer (born 1993)

Personal information
- Full name: Deepak Samundersingh Punia
- Born: 27 September 1993 (age 33); Bhiwani, Haryana, India
- Batting: Right-handed
- Bowling: Right arm medium
- Role: Bowler

Domestic team information
- Years: Team
- 2014/15: Services
- 2015/16–2016/17: Saurashtra
- 2017/18–2020/21: Haryana
- 2021/22–2022/23: Delhi
- Source: ESPNcricinfo, 1 November 2015

Deepak Punia (born 27 September 1993) is an Indian former first-class cricketer who played for Delhi, Haryana, Saurashtra and Services. In 2016, he was bought by the Mumbai Indians for the 2016 Indian Premier League.

In October 2017, an arrest warrant was issued for Punia by the Indian Navy, after he was reported to be playing for Haryana in the 2017–18 Ranji Trophy without having permission from the Navy to do so.
