= Pankaj Jaswal =

Indian cricketer (born 1995)

Personal information
- Full name: Pankaj Pawan Jaswal
- Born: 20 September 1995 (age 31); Kangra, Himachal Pradesh, India
- Source: Cricinfo, 1 November 2015

Pankaj Jaswal (born 20 September 1995) is an Indian cricketer who plays for Himachal Pradesh. In October 2017, he made the second-fastest fifty in the history of the Ranji Trophy, doing so in 16 balls.

He was the leading wicket-taker for Himachal Pradesh in the 2018–19 Vijay Hazare Trophy, with ten dismissals in six matches. On 2 November 2018, in Himachal Pradesh's match against Bengal in the 2018–19 Ranji Trophy, he took his maiden five-wicket haul in first-class cricket. He was the leading wicket-taker for Himachal Pradesh in the tournament, with 25 dismissals in eight matches.

In December 2018, he was bought by the Mumbai Indians in the player auction for the 2019 Indian Premier League. He was released by the Mumbai Indians ahead of the 2020 IPL auction.
