= Abhijit Sarkar (cricketer) =

Indian cricketer (born 1996)

Personal information
- Full name: Abhijit Kinkar Sarkar
- Born: 20 December 1996 (age 29); Unakoti, Tripura, India
- Source: ESPNcricinfo, 11 October 2015

Abhijit Sarkar (born 20 December 1996) is an Indian first-class cricketer who plays for Tripura. He made his List A debut for Tripura in the 2016–17 Vijay Hazare Trophy on 25 February 2017.

He was the leading wicket-taker for Tripura in the 2017–18 Ranji Trophy, with 15 dismissals in six matches.
