= Swapnil Asnodkar =

Indian first-class cricketer (born 1984)

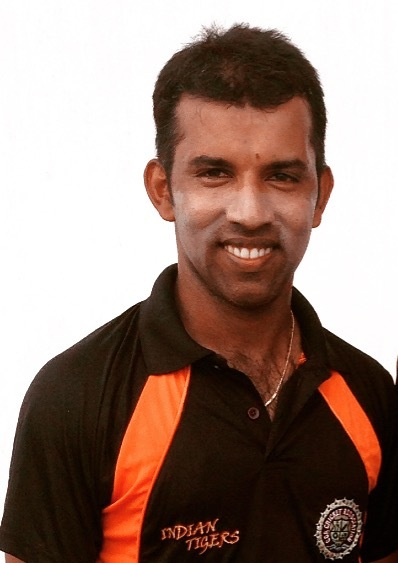

Personal information
- Full name: Swapnil Ashok Asnodkar
- Born: 29 March 1984 (age 42); Porvorim, Goa, India
- Batting: Right-handed
- Bowling: Right-arm off break
- Role: Opening batsman

Domestic team information
- Years: Team
- 2001/02–2018: Goa
- 2008–2011: Rajasthan Royals

Career statistics
Competition	FC	LA	T20
Matches	88	85	73
Runs scored	5,883	2,858	1,699
Batting average	40.02	36.17	22.56
100s/50s	14/25	6/19	0/13
Top score	254*	127	75
Balls bowled	156	37	0
Wickets	1	0	0
Bowling average	68.00	–	–
5 wickets in innings	0	0	–
10 wickets in match	0	–	–
Best bowling	1/21	–	–
Catches/stumpings	34/–	21/–	21/–
- Source: CricketArchive, 30 March 2025

Swapnil Asnodkar (born 29 March 1984), is an Indian first-class former cricketer. He was a hard hitting right-handed opening batsman who played for Goa in first class cricket, and Rajasthan Royals in the Indian Premier League.

== Domestic career ==
He was the leading run-scorer for Goa in the 2017–18 Ranji Trophy, with 369 runs in six matches.

== Indian Premier League ==
Playing for Rajasthan Royals, he scored 311 runs at a strike rate of 133.47.

He formed a strong opening partnership with South African captain Graeme Smith. By the end of the tournament they had scored 418 runs together at an average of 59.71 – the highest of the tournament. In the seven IPL matches he played, he scored 244 runs at 34.86 with a strike rate of 127.08. On his IPL debut against Kolkata Knight Riders, he scored 60 runs from 34 balls. His innings included 10 fours and one six with a strike rate 176.47. He bowls right-arm offbreak. He was called up to an Indian emerging players' tour to Israel in July 2008.

== Coaching ==
In 2019, he took the charge as the coach for the Goa under 23 cricket team.
