= Soumik Chatterjee =

Indian cricketer (born 1988)

Personal information
- Born: 27 September 1988 (age 38); Howrah, West Bengal, India
- Source: Cricinfo, 11 October 2015

Soumik Chatterjee (born 27 September 1988) is an Indian first-class cricketer who plays for Services.
