= Darshan Misal =

Indian cricketer (born 1992)

Personal information
- Full name: Darshan Wagha Misal
- Born: 11 September 1992 (age 34); Curchorem, Goa, India
- Source: ESPNcricinfo, 10 October 2015

Darshan Misal (born 11 September 1992) is an Indian first-class cricketer who plays for Goa. He was the leading wicket-taker for Goa in the 2017–18 Ranji Trophy, with 14 dismissals in six matches.
