= Jaskaran Singh (Jharkhand cricketer) =

Indian cricketer (born 1991)

Personal information
- Full name: Jaskaran Singh
- Born: 21 December 1991 (age 34); Jamshedpur, India
- Batting: Left-handed
- Bowling: Left-arm fast-medium
- Role: Bowler

Domestic team information
- Years: Team
- 2011/12–2018/19: Jharkhand

Career statistics
Competition	T20	FC
Matches	15	15
Runs scored	18	86
Batting average	–	6.61
100s/50s	0/0	0/0
Top score	12*	30
Balls bowled	312	1909
Wickets	12	30
Bowling average	34.83	30.76
5 wickets in innings	-	-
10 wickets in match	-	-
Best bowling	3/27	5/85
Catches/stumpings	5/–	4/–
- Source: ESPNcricinfo, 23 January 2018

Jaskaran Singh (born 21 December 1991) is an Indian former first-class cricketer who played for Jharkhand.
