= Arpit Vasavada =

Indian cricketer (born 1988)

Personal information
- Full name: Arpit Vyomahesh Vasavada
- Born: 28 October 1988 (age 38); Rajkot, Gujarat, India
- Batting: Left-handed
- Bowling: Slow left-arm orthodox
- Role: All-rounder

Domestic team information
- Years: Team
- 2008/09–present: Saurashtra

Career statistics
Competition	FC	LA	T20
Matches	18	14	6
Runs scored	1,193	368	117
Batting average	49.70	33.45	23.40
100s/50s	3/7	0/4	0/0
Top score	205	99*	45*
Balls bowled	234	124	96
Wickets	1	7	9
Bowling average	177.00	14.71	11.77
5 wickets in innings	0	0	0
10 wickets in match	0	0	0
Best bowling	1/102	3/19	4/18
Catches/stumpings	21/–	4/–	3/–
- Source: ESPNcricinfo, 8 October 2014

Arpit Vyomahesh Vasavada (born 28 October 1988) is an Indian cricketer who plays for Saurashtra cricket team. He is a left-handed all-rounder who bowls slow left-arm orthodox. He has also represented the West Zone cricket team.
