= Subrat Das =

Cricket umpire

Personal information
- Full name: Subrat Das
- Born: 1 May 1963 (age 63)
- Role: Umpire

Umpiring information
- WODIs umpired: 3 (2010–2015)
- WT20Is umpired: 2 (2015–2015)
- FC umpired: 70 (1999–2024)
- LA umpired: 77 (1999–2021)
- T20 umpired: 67 (2007–2021)
- Source: ESPNcricinfo, 17 February 2024

Subrat Das (born 1 May 1963) is an Indian cricket umpire. Das has umpired 3 Women's One Day International cricket matches, 1 Women's Twenty20 International match, 61 first-class matches, 56 List A matches and 36 Twenty20 matches as of March 2017.

Das made his debut as an international umpire during the fourth WODI match between England and India in February 2010 at the Dr. Y.S. Rajasekhara Reddy ACA-VDCA Cricket Stadium in Visakhapatnam. Three days later, he stood in the fifth and final WODI match of the series held at Bandra Kurla Complex Ground in Mumbai. He most recently umpired the fifth WODI match between New Zealand and India on 8 July 2015 at the M. Chinnaswamy Stadium in Bangalore. At the same venue a week later, he umpired his maiden WT20I match between the same two teams.

Das received the Saroj Mahasuara Memorial award for outstanding umpiring in 2010.

He attended Dharanidhar College in Kendujhar until 1983 and he currently resides in Sambalpur.
