= Paras Dogra =

Indian cricketer (born 1984)

Personal information
- Born: 19 November 1984 (age 41); Palampur, Himachal Pradesh, India
- Batting: Right-handed
- Bowling: Legbreak
- Role: Batsman

Domestic team information
- Years: Team
- 2001/02–2017/18: Himachal Pradesh
- 2010: Rajasthan Royals
- 2012: Kings XI Punjab
- 2013: Kolkata Knight Riders
- 2018/19–2023/24: Pondicherry
- 2024/25: Jammu & Kashmir

Career statistics
Competition	FC	LA	T20
Matches	143	124	105
Runs scored	9,966	3,696	2,324
Batting average	48.37	41.52	27.66
100s/50s	32/33	6/21	0/13
Top score	253	136*	93*
Balls bowled	868	37	1
Wickets	5	0	0
Bowling average	81.40	–	–
5 wickets in innings	0	–	–
10 wickets in match	0	–	–
Best bowling	1/14	–	–
Catches/stumpings	173/–	74/–	64/–
- Source: ESPNcricinfo, 12 February 2025

Paras Dogra (born 19 November 1984) is an Indian cricketer who has played first-class cricket since 2001. He is a right-handed batsman.

== Career ==
In November 2015, Dogra equalled the record of double centuries scored in the Ranji Trophy when he scored his seventh score of 200 runs or more.

For most of his career he played for Himachal Pradesh in the Ranji Trophy. In the Indian Premier League, he has played for Rajasthan Royals, Kings XI Punjab and Kolkata Knight Riders. Ahead of the 2018–19 Ranji Trophy, he transferred from Himachal Pradesh to Puducherry. He was the leading run-scorer for Puducherry in the 2018–19 Vijay Hazare Trophy, with 257 runs in six matches.

In November 2018, Dogra became the first batsman for Puducherry to score a century in the Ranji Trophy. The following month, he scored 253 from 244 balls against Sikkim. It was his eighth double century, the most by a batsman in the Ranji Trophy. He was the leading run-scorer for Puducherry in the 2018–19 Ranji Trophy, with 729 runs in eight matches.

In February 28, he lifted the Ranjit Trophy captaining for J&K team at the same venue where he made his debut playing for India A, scripting a record history for himself and his team.
