= Rajat Paliwal =

Indian cricketer (born 1991)

Personal information
- Full name: Rajat Suresh Paliwal
- Born: 24 December 1991 (age 34); Sonipat, Haryana, India
- Nickname: pali
- Batting: Right-handed
- Bowling: Right-arm off-break
- Role: Batsman

Domestic team information
- Years: Team
- 2011/12–present: Services

Career statistics
Competition	First-class
Matches	76
Runs scored	4927
Batting average	43.99
100s/50s	14/18
Top score	203
Balls bowled	1685
Wickets	25
Bowling average	34.60
5 wickets in innings	0
10 wickets in match	0
Best bowling	4/22
Catches/stumpings	74/0
- Source: Cricinfo, 15 January 2013

Rajat Suresh Paliwal (born 24 December 1991) is an Indian cricketer who plays for Services in domestic cricket. He is a right-hand batsman and an occasional right arm off-break bowler.

He was the leading run-scorer for Haryana in the 2017–18 Ranji Trophy, with 380 runs in six matches. He was the leading run-scorer for Services in the 2018–19 Vijay Hazare Trophy, with 336 runs in eight matches.

Ahead of the 2018–19 Ranji Trophy, he transferred from Haryana to Services. He was the leading run-scorer for Services in the tournament, with 652 runs in nine matches.
