= Samar Quadri =

Indian cricketer (born 1989)

Personal information
- Full name: Samar Safdar Quadri
- Born: 27 July 1989 (age 37); Patna, Bihar, India
- Batting: Right-handed
- Bowling: Right-arm legbreak googly
- Role: Bowler

Domestic team information
- Years: Team
- 2009–: Jharkhand
- 2018–: Bihar
- First-class debut: 17–20 November 2009 Jharkhand v Assam
- Last First-class: 1–2 November 2018 Bihar v Uttarakhand
- Last List A: 14 October 2018 Bihar v Mumbai

Career statistics
Competition	First-class	List A	T20
Matches	35	10	4
Runs scored	177	9	2
Batting average	6.32	9.00	-
100s/50s	0/0	0/0	0/0
Top score	17*	4	1*
Balls bowled	6759	551	78
Wickets	122	15	6
Bowling average	30.72	21.53	15.16
5 wickets in innings	6	1	0
10 wickets in match	0	0	0
Best bowling	6/65	5/22	3/16
Catches/stumpings	9/0	2/0	0/0
- Source: Cricinfo, 7 October 2018

Samar Quadri (born 27 July 1989) is an Indian cricketer who plays for Bihar. He made his first-class debut for Jharkhand against Assam on 17 November 2009 in 2009-10 Ranji Trophy. He made his List A debut on 3 March 2014, for Jharkhand in the 2013–14 Vijay Hazare Trophy.
