= Kaushal Singh =

Indian cricketer (born 1996)

Personal information
- Full name: Kaushal Raja Singh
- Born: 10 October 1996 (age 30); Ranchi, Jharkhand, India
- Source: ESPNcricinfo, 11 October 2015

Kaushal Singh (born 10 October 1996) is an Indian first-class cricketer who plays for Jharkhand. He made his List A debut on 3 March 2014, for Jharkhand in the 2013–14 Vijay Hazare Trophy. He scored his maiden first-class century in the 2016–17 Ranji Trophy in October 2016.
