= Ishank Jaggi =

Indian cricketer

Personal information
- Full name: Ishank Jaggi
- Born: 27 January 1989 (age 37); Jamshedpur, Jharkhand, India
- Batting: Right-handed
- Role: Batsman

Domestic team information
- Years: Team
- 2007–2021: Jharkhand
- 2011–2012: Deccan Chargers
- 2017: Kolkata Knight Riders

Career statistics
Competition	FC	LA	T20
Matches	90	20	16
Runs scored	5600	531	351
Batting average	42.10	35.40	29.25
100s/50s	19/21	1/1	0/3
Top score	201^*	111*	71*
Balls bowled	114	6	–
Wickets	1	0	–
Bowling average	55.00	–	–
5 wickets in innings	0	–	–
10 wickets in match	0	–	–
Best bowling	1/15	–	–
Catches/stumpings	19/–	5/–	7/–
- Source: ESPNcricinfo, 23 January 2013

Ishank Jaggi (born 27 January 1989) is an Indian cricketer. He is a right-handed batsman and a leg-break bowler who plays for Jharkhand. He was born in Bacheli. He was brought up in Jamshedpur.

== Biography ==
Jaggi began his youth career playing with Bihar's Under-15s team, in the 2002-03 Polly Umrigar Trophy - scoring a duck in his first appearance. Though he did not make another appearance in that season's competition, he played five further games in the following season's competition, before moving to Jharkhand. Jaggi continued his youth career for the Eastern Indian team, moving up to Under-17s cricket and, two seasons later, Under-19s cricket.

Thanks to his performances, which included a hard-fought innings of 115 in the quarter-final of the 2006-07 Vinoo Mankad Trophy, Jaggi was offered his first two List A appearances the following month, in the first match of which he contributed a fifth-ball duck.

At the back end of the following season, Jaggi made five further List A appearances, four in the Vijay Hazare trophy. Jaggi's first-class debut followed at the start of 2008–09, against Jammu and Kashmir. Batting in the upper-order, he scored 58 in the first innings in which he batted, and an unbeaten 71 in the second - securing two half-centuries on debut.

Jaggi made his debut century in his second match, against Haryana.

Jaggi was part of Royal Challengers Bangalore in the inaugural season of IPL in 2008 but did not feature in any match for team RCB.

He was signed by the Deccan Chargers for IPL 2011 and was retained by the team for IPL 2012.

In February 2017, he was bought by the Kolkata Knight Riders team for the 2017 Indian Premier League for 10 lakhs. In January 2018, he was again signed up by the Kolkata Knight Riders in the 2018 IPL auction.
