= Saurabh Bandekar =

Indian cricketer (born 1987)

Personal information
- Full name: Saurabh Sushant Bandekar
- Born: 16 July 1987 (age 39); Bombay, Maharashtra, India (present-day Mumbai, India)
- Source: Cricinfo, 10 October 2015

Saurabh Bandekar (born 16 November 1987), is an Indian cricketer who played for Goa. He played in 64 first-class, 43 List A and 33 Twenty20 matches from 2004 to 2017.
