= Kamlesh Makvana =

Indian cricketer (born 1983)

Personal information
- Full name: Kamlesh Rasikbhai Makvana
- Born: 31 August 1983 (age 43); Rajkot, Gujarat, India
- Batting: Right-handed
- Bowling: Right arm off break
- Role: All-rounder

Domestic team information
- Years: Team
- 2004–present: Saurashtra

Career statistics
Competition	FC	LA	T20
Matches	53	33	11
Runs scored	1,380	404	36
Batting average	25.55	23.76	7.20
100s/50s	2/7	0/3	0/0
Top score	108*	64	10
Balls bowled	9,009	1797	234
Wickets	134	38	12
Bowling average	34.20	35.60	21.75
5 wickets in innings	8	0	0
10 wickets in match	2	0	0
Best bowling	6/22	3/32	2/12
Catches/stumpings	28/–	6/–	5/–

Kamlesh Makvana (born 31 August 1983) is a former cricketer who has played domestic cricket for Saurashtra. Makvana is an allrounder - a right hand batsman and offbreak bowler. He has also played for West Zone cricket team. He was the first bowler for Saurashtra to take 200 wickets in the Ranji Trophy.
