= Shiv Gautam =

Indian cricketer (born 1988)

Personal information
- Born: 29 October 1988 (age 38); Ranchi, Jharkhand, India
- Source: Cricinfo, 11 October 2015

Shiv Gautam (born 29 October 1988) is an Indian first-class cricketer who plays for Jharkhand.
