= 2015–16 Ranji Trophy =

Cricket tournament

- The Ranji Trophy, awarded to the winners
- Dates: 1 October 2015 – 28 February 2016
- Administrator: BCCI
- Cricket format: First-class cricket
- Tournament format: Round-robin then knockout
- Host: India
- Champions: Mumbai (41st title)
- Participants: 27
- Matches: 115
- Most runs: Shreyas Iyer (1321) (Mumbai)
- Most wickets: Shahbaz Nadeem (51) (Jharkhand)

The 2015–16 Ranji Trophy was the 82nd season of the Ranji Trophy, the premier first-class cricket tournament in India. It was contested by 27 teams divided into three groups of nine teams each. The top three teams from Groups A and B advanced to the quarterfinals along with the top two teams from Group C. For this season the schedule splits into two stages, the first is a league stage and the second being a knock-out stage. The league stage starts on 1 October 2015 and ends on 4 December 2015 and the knock-out stage starts on 3 February 2016 and ends on 28 February 2016. The 2015–16 Ranji Trophy will be followed by the Vijay Hazare Trophy, Syed Mushtaq Ali Trophy and Deodhar Trophy.

The final was contested by Saurashtra and Mumbai, a repeat of the 2012–13 final. Mumbai won the match by an innings and 21 runs to claim their 41st title.

== Personnel changes ==
=== Players ===
Player	From	To	Role
Sarfaraz Khan	Mumbai	Uttar Pradesh	Batsman
Tashuk Ali	Himachal Pradesh	Mumbai	All rounder
Pragyan Ojha	Hyderabad	Bengal	Spinner
Wasim Jaffer	Mumbai	Vidarbha	Opening Batsman
Sainty Pathak	Delhi	Haryana	Opening Batsman
Mithun Manhas	Delhi	J&K	Batsman
RP Singh	Uttar Pradesh	Gujarat	Seam Bowler
Prasanth Parameswaran	Tamil Nadu	Goa	Seam Bowler
Amit Verma	Kerala	Assam	Batsman

=== Coaches ===
Coach	From	To	Role
Chandrakant Pandit		Mumbai	Coach
Hrishikesh Kanitkar		Goa	Coach
Dheeraj Jadhav		Goa	Asst. Coach
Sairaj Bahutule		Bengal	Coach
Lakshmipathy Balaji		Tamil Nadu	Bowling Coach
Rizwan Shamshad		Uttar Pradesh	Head coach
Ajay Jadeja		Delhi	Head coach

== Teams ==
The groups drawn are as follows

Group A

- Assam
- Bengal
- Delhi
- Haryana
- Karnataka
- Maharashtra
- Odisha
- Rajasthan
- Vidarbha

Group B

- Andhra Pradesh
- Baroda
- Gujarat
- Madhya Pradesh
- Mumbai
- Punjab
- Railways
- Tamil Nadu
- Uttar Pradesh

Group C

- Goa
- Himachal Pradesh
- Hyderabad
- Jammu & Kashmir
- Jharkhand
- Kerala
- Saurashtra
- Services
- Tripura

== Group A ==
Points table

Team	Pld	W	L	D	A	WI	FI	Pts	NRR
Vidarbha	8	4	2	2	0	1	1	29	0.047
Bengal	8	2	0	6	0	0	5	28	0.110
Assam	8	3	2	3	0	1	2	26	–0.304
Delhi	8	3	1	4	0	1	1	25	0.215
Karnataka	8	2	1	5	0	1	3	24	0.336
Rajasthan	8	2	3	3	0	0	1	17	–0.313
Maharashtra	8	1	2	5	0	0	3	17	0.301
Odisha	8	1	3	4	0	0	1	12	0.016
Haryana	8	0	4	4	0	0	1	6	–0.406

- Top three teams advanced to knockout stage.
- Bottom placed team relegated to Group C for 2016–17 Ranji Trophy.

== Group B ==
Points table

Team	Pld	W	L	D	A	WI	FI	Pts	NRR
Mumbai	8	4	0	4	0	1	3	35	0.851
Punjab	8	3	2	3	0	1	2	26	0.045
Madhya Pradesh	8	3	2	3	0	1	1	24	–0.059
Gujarat	8	3	1	4	0	2	0	24	–0.092
Uttar Pradesh	8	2	1	5	0	0	2	21	–0.117
Tamil Nadu	8	2	2	4	0	0	1	18	–0.321
Baroda	8	2	3	3	0	2	0	17	–0.045
Railways	8	2	6	0	0	0	0	12	0.039
Andhra Pradesh	8	0	4	4	0	0	3	10	–0.459

- Top three teams advanced to knockout stage.
- Bottom placed team relegated to Group C for 2016–17 Ranji Trophy.

== Group C ==
Points table

Team	Pld	W	L	D	A	WI	FI	Pts	NRR
Saurashtra	8	5	1	2	0	1	0	36	–0.061
Jharkhand	8	4	2	2	0	0	0	31	0.093
Himachal Pradesh	8	3	1	4	0	1	0	30	1.201
Services	8	3	1	4	0	0	1	27	0.473
Kerala	8	2	2	4	0	0	2	25	0.589
Goa	8	1	1	6	0	0	1	18	–0.206
Jammu & Kashmir	8	0	3	5	0	0	0	9	0.870
Hyderabad	8	0	2	6	0	0	0	8	–0.330
Tripura	8	0	5	3	0	0	0	3	–0.760

- Top two teams advanced to knockout stage and promoted to Group A and Group B respectively for 2016–17 Ranji Trophy.

== Knockout stage ==
Quarterfinals
A1	Vidarbha	151 & 139
C1	Saurashtra	375
A3	Assam	323 & 101
B2	Punjab	137 & 236
A2	Bengal	121 & 432
B3	Madhya Pradesh	348 & 560/9d
C2	Jharkhand	172 & 94
B1	Mumbai	416 & 245

Semifinals
C1	Saurashtra	353 & 24/0
A3	Assam	234 & 139
B3	Madhya Pradesh	227 & 361/5
B1	Mumbai	371 & 426

Final
C1	Saurashtra	235 & 115
B1	Mumbai	371

=== Quarter-finals ===
1st Quarter-final

3–7 February
Scorecard

Vidarbha	v	Saurashtra
151 (50.4 overs); Wasim Jaffer 41 (86); Jaydev Unadkat 5/70 (18.4 overs)		375 (112.4 overs); Sagar Jogiyani 130 (261); Umesh Yadav 5/81 (23 overs)
139 (68.1 overs); Wasim Jaffer 48 (78); Jaydev Unadkat 4/35 (16.1 overs)

Saurashtra won by an innings and 85 runs
ACA-VDCA Cricket Stadium, Visakhapatnam
Umpires: Saiyed Khalid and Chirra Ravikanthreddy
Player of the match: Jaydev Unadkat (Saurashtra)

- Saurashtra won the toss and elected to field.

2nd Quarter-final

3–7 February
Scorecard

Assam	v	Punjab
323 (108 overs); Jamaluddin Syed Mohammad 121 (223); Siddarth Kaul 4/99 (31 overs)		137 (47.2 overs); Mayank Sidhana 80* (131); Arup Das 3/41 (15.2 overs)
101 (35.5 overs); Arup Das 31 (18); Barinder Sran 5/43 (15 overs)		236 (63.2 overs); Gurkeerat Singh 64 (55); Arup Das 8/83 (21.2 overs)

Assam won by 51 runs
Sardar Vallabhbhai Patel Stadium, Valsad
Umpires: Nitin Menon and Nitin Pandit
Player of the match: Arup Das (Assam)

- Punjab won the toss and elected to field.

3rd Quarter-final

3–7 February
Scorecard

Madhya Pradesh	v	Bengal
348 (114.5 overs); Aditya Shrivastava 65 (142); Veer Pratap Singh 5/76 (23 overs)		121 (45.2 overs); Swagato (Raka) 48 (100); Ishwar Pandey 4/45 (16 overs)
560/9d (160.3 overs); Harpreet Singh 139 (206); Ashok Dinda 2/92 (32.3 overs)		432 (91.4 overs); Manoj Tiwary 124 (160); Ishwar Pandey(Bunty) 4/93 (22.4 overs)

Madhya Pradesh won by 355 runs
Brabourne Stadium, Mumbai
Umpires: Anil Dandekar and Rajesh Deshpande
Player of the match: Ishwar Pandey (Madhya Pradesh)

- Bengal won the toss and elected to field.
- Chandrakant Sakure (Madhya Pradesh) made his first-class debut.

4th Quarter-final

3–7 February
Scorecard

Mumbai	v	Jharkhand
416 (114.4 overs); Akhil Herwadkar 107 (217); Shahbaz Nadeem 5/140 (39 overs)		172 (71.5 overs); Kaushal Singh 43 (92); Akhil Herwadkar 3/26 (11 overs)
245 (63.1 overs); Shreyas Iyer 81 (106); Samar Quadri 5/62 (18.1 overs)		94 (42.4 overs); Shiv Gautam 27 (120); Jay Bista 5/16 (6.4 overs)

Mumbai won by 395 runs
Srikantadatta Narasimha Raja Wadeyar Ground, Mysore
Umpires: Abhijit Deshmukh and Navdeep Singh
Player of the match: Akhil Herwadkar (Mumbai)

- Mumbai won the toss and elected to bat.
- Sufiyan Shaikh (Mumbai) made his first-class debut.

=== Semi-finals ===
1st Semi-final

13–17 February
Scorecard

Assam	v	Saurashtra
234 (87 overs); Amit Verma 98 (241); Jaydev Unadkat 6/77 (26 overs)		353 (113.5 overs); Cheteshwar Pujara 126 (243); Krishna Das 3/80 (37 overs)
139 (39.1 overs); Syed Mohammad 39 (69); Jaydev Unadkat 5/45 (13 overs)		24/0 (3.1 overs); Sagar Jogiyani 23* (10)

Saurashtra won by 10 wickets
Moti Bagh Stadium, Vadodara
Umpires: Nand Kishore and Krishnamachari Srinivasan
Player of the match: Jaydev Unadkat (Saurashtra)

- Saurashtra won the toss and elected to field.

2nd Semi-final

13–17 February
Scorecard

Mumbai	v	Madhya Pradesh
371 (102.5 overs); Shreyas Iyer 90 (104); Chandrakant Sakure 5/137 (29.5 overs)		227 (92.1 overs); Naman Ojha 79 (189); Balwinder Sandhu 5/43 (21.1 overs)
426 (125.1 overs); Suryakumar Yadav 115 (199); Harpreet Singh 3/55 (17 overs)		361/5 (109 overs); Naman Ojha 113 (185); Bhavin Thakkar 1/3 (2 overs)

Match drawn (Mumbai won on 1st innings)
DRIEMS Ground, Cuttack
Umpires: K. N. Ananthapadmanabhan and Virender Sharma

- Madhya Pradesh won the toss and elected to field.
- Jagdeep Baweja (Madhya Pradesh) made his first-class debut.
- Mumbai progressed to the final due to the first innings lead.
- Shreyas Iyer (Mumbai) became the fifth player to score 1,200 runs in a single Ranji Trophy competition.

=== Final ===
24–28 February
Scorecard

Saurashtra	v	Mumbai
235 (93.2 overs); Arpit Vasavada 77 (214); Dhawal Kulkarni 5/42 (23 overs)		371 (82.2 overs); Shreyas Iyer 117 (142); Jaydev Unadkat 4/118 (25.2 overs)
115 (48.2 overs); Cheteshwar Pujara 27 (98); Shardul Thakur 5/26 (13.2 overs)

Mumbai won by an innings and 21 runs
MCA Stadium, Pune
Umpires: C. K. Nandan and Chettithody Shamshuddin
Player of the match: Shreyas Iyer (Mumbai)

- Mumbai won the toss and elected to field.
- Prerak Mankad (Saurashtra) made his first-class debut.

== Statistics ==
=== Batting records ===
==== Most runs ====
Player name	Style	Team	Run
Shreyas Iyer	Right-handed Middle-order	Mumbai	1321
Akhil Herwadkar	Left-handed Opening	Mumbai	879
Arun Karthik	Right-handed Middle-order	Assam	802

==== High scores ====
Player name	Style	Team	Run	Ground
Natraj Behera	Right-handed Opening	Odisha	255*	CH Bansi Lal Cricket Stadium, Rohtak
Swapnil Asnodkar	Right-handed Opening	Goa	232	Gandhi Memorial Science College Ground, Jammu
Paras Dogra	Right-handed Middle-order	Himachal Pradesh	227	Himachal Pradesh Cricket Association Stadium, Dharamshala
Tashuk Ali	Right-handed Middle-order	Mumbai	220*	Himachal Pradesh Cricket Association Stadium, Dharmshala

==== Most hundreds ====
Player name	Style	Team	100s
Rajat Paliwal	Right-handed Middle-order	Services	4
Sudip Chatterjee	Left-handed Middle-order	Bengal	4
Shreyas Iyer	Right-handed Middle-order	Mumbai	4

==== Most fifties (and over) ====
Player name	Style	Team	50+
Shreyas Iyer	Right-handed Middle-order	Mumbai	11
Harpreet Singh Bhatia	Left-handed Middle-order	Madhya Pradesh	8
Tashuk ali	Right-handed Middle-order	Mumbai	8

==== Most sixes in an innings ====
Player name	Style	Team	50+	Ground
Ishan Kishan	Left-handed Opening	Jharkhand	8	Madhavrao Scindia Cricket Ground, Rajkot
Paras Dogra	Right-handed Middle-order	Himachal Pradesh	8	Himachal Pradesh Cricket Association Stadium, Dharamshala
