= Saurashtra cricket team =

Indian cricket team

Personnel
- Captain: Jaydev Unadkat (FC & T20); Harvik Desai (LA)
- Coach: Niraj Odedra
- Owner: Saurashtra Cricket Association

Team information
- Founded: 1933
- Home ground: Niranjan Shah Stadium, Rajkot

History
- First-class debut: Marylebone Cricket Club in 1933 at Rajkumar College Ground, Rajkot
- Ranji Trophy wins: 4
- Irani Trophy wins: 0
- Vijay Hazare Trophy wins: 2
- Official website: SCA

Saurashtra cricket team is one of the three first-class cricket teams based in the Indian state of Gujarat (the other two being the Baroda cricket team and the Gujarat cricket team) that competes in India's first-class cricket tournament Ranji Trophy and limited-overs cricket tournaments Vijay Hazare Trophy and Syed Mushtaq Ali Trophy.

== Competition history ==
Previous teams competing from Saurashtra were Nawanagar and Western India. Nawanagar won the Ranji Trophy in 1936–37 and were runners up in 1937–38. Western India won the Ranji Trophy in 1943–44.

Saurashtra began competing as Kathiawar in the 1946–47 Ranji Trophy. In the 1950–51 Ranji Trophy they started competing as Saurashtra.

Saurashtra were runners-up in the Ranji Trophy to Mumbai in 2012–13 and 2015–16 and in 2018–19 against Vidarbha. They finally won the Ranji Trophy for the first time in 2019–20 when they beat Bengal on first-innings lead in the final at Rajkot. They won again in 2022–23, when they beat Bengal again, this time by nine wickets in the final at Kolkata.

== Honours ==
Western India

- Ranji Trophy
  - Winners (1): 1943–44

Nawanagar

- Ranji Trophy
  - Winners (1): 1936–37
  - Runners-up (1): 1937–38

Saurashtra

- Ranji Trophy
  - Winners (2): 2019–20, 2022–23
  - Runners-up (3): 2012–13, 2015–16, 2018–19
- Vijay Hazare Trophy
  - Winners (2): 2007–08, 2022-23
  - Runners-up (2): 2017–18, 2025–26

== Home ground ==
- Niranjan Shah Stadium, Rajkot
- Madhavrao Sindhia Cricket Ground, Rajkot

== International players ==
International players from Saurashtra cricket team include:

- Karsan Ghavri
- Ravindra Jadeja
- Cheteshwar Pujara
- Jaydev Unadkat
- Chetan Sakariya
- Yajurvindra Singh

Robin Uthappa played two seasons for Saurashtra.

== Players ==
=== Current squad ===
Players with international caps are listed.

Name	Birth date	Batting style	Bowling style	Notes
Batsmen
Sammar Gajjar	14 August 2003 (age 23)	Left-handed	Slow left-arm orthodox	
Jay Gohil	13 December 2000 (age 25)	Right-handed	Right-arm off break	
Arpit Vasavada	28 October 1988 (age 38)	Left-handed	Slow left-arm orthodox	
Vishvaraj Jadeja	19 July 1998 (age 28)	Right-handed	Right-arm medium	
Ruchit Ahir	28 October 2000 (age 26)	Right-handed	Right-arm medium	
Hetvik Kotak	12 October 2001 (age 25)	Right-handed	Right-arm off break	
Siddhant Rana	18 February 2001 (age 25)	Right-handed		
Harvansh Pangalia	3 November 2006 (age 20)	Left-handed		
All-rounders
Prerak Mankad	23 April 1994 (age 32)	Right-handed	Right-arm medium	
Chirag Jani	9 November 1989 (age 37)	Right-handed	Right-arm medium	
Ravindra Jadeja	6 December 1988 (age 37)	Left-handed	Slow left-arm orthodox	Plays for Rajasthan Royals in IPL
Parswaraj Rana	20 December 2000 (age 25)	Left-handed	Slow left-arm orthodox	
Neel Pandya	7 February 2002 (age 24)	Right-handed	Right-arm medium	
Wicket-keeper
Harvik Desai	4 October 1999 (age 27)	Right-handed		List A Captain
Spin Bowlers
Parth Bhut	4 August 1997 (age 29)	Right-handed	Slow left-arm orthodox	
Yuvrajsinh Dodiya	3 October 2000 (age 26)	Right-handed	Right-arm off break	
Krains Fultera	19 June 2004 (age 22)	Right-handed	Slow left-arm unorthodox	
Arth Yadav	25 September 2000 (age 26)	Right-handed	Right-arm off break	
Pace Bowlers
Jaydev Unadkat	18 October 1991 (age 35)	Right-handed	Left-arm medium-fast	First-class & Twenty20 Captain
Chetan Sakariya	28 February 1998 (age 28)	Right-handed	Left-arm medium-fast	
Ankur Panwar	10 September 1999 (age 27)	Right-handed	Right-arm medium	
Hiten Kanbi	25 April 2004 (age 22)	Right-handed	Right-arm medium	

Updated as on 17 November 2026

== Coaching staff ==
- Head coach: (India) Niraj Odedra
- Manager: Arjunsinh Rana
- Head Physiotherapist: Abhishek Thakar
