= 2015–16 Hyderabad C.A. season =

Indian cricket team season

Hyderabad C.A.
2015–16 season
- Coach: Abdul Azeem (Senior men's); Purnima Rao (Senior women's)
- Captain: Hanuma Vihari (Senior men's); Sravanthi Naidu (Senior women's)
- Ground(s): Rajiv Gandhi International Cricket Stadium, Hyderabad (Capacity: 55,000)
- Ranji Trophy: Group C (8th)
- One-Day League: Elite Super League (4th)
- Vijay Hazare Trophy: Group A (6th)
- T20 League: Elite Group B (4th)
- Syed Mushtaq Ali Trophy: Group A (5th)

The 2015–16 season is Hyderabad cricket team's 82nd competitive season. The Hyderabad cricket team and Hyderabad women's cricket team are senior men's and women's domestic cricket teams based in the city of Hyderabad, India, run by the Hyderabad Cricket Association. They represent the state of Telangana in domestic competitions.

== Competition overview ==
Category	Competition	Format	First match	Last match	Final position	Pld	W	L	D / T / NR	Win %
Senior men's	Ranji Trophy	First-class cricket	1 October 2015	1 December 2015	Group Stage	8	0	2	6	0%
Senior women's	One-Day League	Women's List A cricket	15 November 2015	4 December 2015	Elite Super League Stage	7	4	3	0	57.14%
Senior men's	Vijay Hazare Trophy	List A cricket	11 December 2015	18 December 2015	Group Stage	6	1	5	0	16.67%
Senior women's	T20 League	Women's Twenty20 cricket	2 January 2016	6 January 2016	Elite Group Stage	4	2	2	0	50%
Senior men's	Syed Mushtaq Ali Trophy	Twenty20 cricket	2 January 2016	10 January 2016	Group Stage	6	2	4	0	33.33%

== Senior Men's team ==
=== Squads ===
- Head coach: Abdul Azeem
- Assistant coach : T Dilip
- Fielding Coach : NS Ganesh
- Physio : Prasanth Panchada
- Trainer : Subash Chandra Patro
- Video analyst : E Vinay Kumar

Ranji Trophy	Vijay Hazare Trophy	Syed Mushtaq Ali Trophy
Hanuma Vihari (c); Vishal Sharma; Habeeb Ahmed (wk); Himalay Agarwal; Tanmay Agarwal; Balchander Anirudh; Anwar Ahmed; Ashish Reddy; Akash Bhandari; Mehdi Hasan; Chama Milind; Akshath Reddy; Bavanaka Sandeep; Tirumalasetti Suman; Sudeep Tyagi; Mohammed Siraj	Hanuma Vihari (c); Vishal Sharma; Himalay Agarwal; Tanmay Agarwal; Mehdi Hasan; Jaweed Ali; Chama Milind; Mohammed Siraj; Pagadala Naidu; Ravi Kiran; Akshath Reddy; Bavanaka Sandeep; Tirumalasetti Suman; Kolla Sumanth (wk); Yathin Reddy	Hanuma Vihari (c); Vishal Sharma; Himalay Agarwal; Tanmay Agarwal; Annabathula Akash; Ashish Reddy; Akash Bhandari; Mehdi Hasan; Jaweed Ali; Chama Milind; Mohammed Siraj; Ravi Kiran; Akshath Reddy; Bavanaka Sandeep; Kolla Sumanth (wk)

Sudeep Tyagi moved from the Saurashtra to the Hyderabad ahead of the 2015–16 season.

Indian Premier League

Local franchise, Sunrisers Hyderabad retained Ashish Reddy and picked Tirumalasetti Suman while Delhi Daredevils picked Chama Milind in the IPL Auction for 2016 Indian Premier League season.

=== Ranji Trophy ===
Hyderabad began their campaign in Ranji Trophy, the premier first-class cricket tournament in India, against Goa at Porvorim on 1 October 2015. They finished eighth in Group C with no wins, six draws and two losses.

==== Points table ====
Group C

Team	Pld	W	L	D	A	Pts	NRR
Saurashtra	8	5	1	2	0	36	-0.061
Jharkhand	8	4	2	2	0	31	0.093
Himachal Pradesh	8	3	1	4	0	30	1.201
Services	8	3	1	4	0	27	0.473
Kerala	8	2	2	4	0	25	0.589
Goa	8	1	1	6	0	18	-0.206
Jammu & Kashmir	8	0	3	5	0	9	0.870
Hyderabad	8	0	2	6	0	8	-0.330
Tripura	8	0	5	3	0	3	-0.760

- Top two teams advanced to knockout stage and promoted to Group A / B for 2016–17 Ranji Trophy.

==== Matches ====
Group Stage

1–4 October 2015	Hyderabad	v	Goa	Match Drawn Goa took first innings lead
Scorecard	325 (101 overs); Hanuma Vihari 82 (165); Rituraj Singh 3/74 (25 overs)		425/7 (140.4 overs); Sagun Kamat 109 (286); Vishal Sharma 3/93 (47.4 overs)	Goa Cricket Association Academy Ground, Porvorim; Umpires: Rohan Pandit and Kamlesh Sharma; Player of the match: Sagun Kamat (Goa)
Goa won the toss and elected to field.

8–11 October 2015	Kerala	v	Hyderabad	Match Drawn Kerala took first innings lead
Scorecard	401 (160.2 overs); Rohan Prem 208 (452); Akash Bhandari 5/72 (28.2 overs)		218 (113 overs); Balchander Anirudh 57* (155); Karaparambil Monish 6/91 (43 overs)	Rajiv Gandhi International Stadium, Hyderabad; Umpires: Rajesh Deshpande and Sanjeev Dua; Player of the match: Rohan Prem (Kerala)
Scorecard			176/7 (77 overs) (f/o); Tanmay Agarwal 64 (136); Karaparambil Monish 5/73 (34 overs)	Rajiv Gandhi International Stadium, Hyderabad; Umpires: Rajesh Deshpande and Sanjeev Dua; Player of the match: Rohan Prem (Kerala)
Kerala won the toss and elected to bat.; Fabid Ahmed (Kerala) made his first-class debut.

15–18 October 2015	Hyderabad	v	Himachal Pradesh	Match Drawn Himachal Pradesh took first innings lead
Scorecard	434 (146.3 overs); Tanmay Agarwal 118 (302); Ronit More 4/84 (30.3 overs)		707/8d (195 overs); Robin Bist 220* (343); Chama Milind 3/161 (39 overs)	Himachal Pradesh Cricket Association Stadium, Dharamshala; Umpires: Umesh Dubey and Amiesh Saheba; Player of the match: Robin Bist (Himachal Pradesh)
Scorecard	2/0 (13 overs); Tanmay Agarwal 1* (38)			Himachal Pradesh Cricket Association Stadium, Dharamshala; Umpires: Umesh Dubey and Amiesh Saheba; Player of the match: Robin Bist (Himachal Pradesh)
Himachal Pradesh won the toss and elected to field.; Shresth Nirmohi (Himachal Pradesh) made his first-class debut.

22–25 October 2015	Saurashtra	v	Hyderabad	Saurashtra won by 35 runs
Scorecard	102 (42 overs); Sagar Jogiyani 51 (114); Mehdi Hasan 5/43 (20 overs)		148 (42.2 overs); Kolla Sumanth 41 (52); Ravindra Jadeja 6/75 (21 overs)	Saurashtra Cricket Association Stadium, Rajkot; Umpires: Krishnamachari Bharatan and Ulhas Gandhe; Player of the match: Ravindra Jadeja (Saurashtra)
Scorecard	215 (67 overs); Chirag Jani 65 (72); Mehdi Hasan 5/69 (26 overs)		134 (40 overs); Bavanaka Sandeep 46 (70); Ravindra Jadeja 7/60 (20 overs)	Saurashtra Cricket Association Stadium, Rajkot; Umpires: Krishnamachari Bharatan and Ulhas Gandhe; Player of the match: Ravindra Jadeja (Saurashtra)
Saurashtra won the toss and elected to bat.

30 October – 2 November 2015	Jammu & Kashmir	v	Hyderabad	Match Drawn Jammu & Kashmir took first innings lead
Scorecard	460 (131.2 overs); Mithun Manhas 150 (194); Anwar Ahmed 5/92 (40.2 overs)		280 (92 overs); Tanmay Agarwal 71 (172); Zahoor Sofi 4/37 (13 overs)	Rajiv Gandhi International Stadium, Hyderabad; Umpires: Amiesh Saheba and Tapan Sharma; Player of the match: Mithun Manhas (Jammu & Kashmir)
Scorecard	56/2 (17 overs); Ian Dev Singh 26* (42); Anwar Ahmed 1/8 (3 overs)		329 (113.1 overs) (f/o); Kolla Sumanth 78 (139); Ram Dayal 5/55 (29 overs)	Rajiv Gandhi International Stadium, Hyderabad; Umpires: Amiesh Saheba and Tapan Sharma; Player of the match: Mithun Manhas (Jammu & Kashmir)
Hyderabad won the toss and elected to field.

15–18 November 2015	Services	v	Hyderabad	Match Drawn Services took first innings lead
Scorecard	353 (124 overs); Soumik Chatterjee 156 (292); Ravi Kiran 4/65 (29 overs)		272 (118.5 overs); Akshath Reddy 125 (261); Diwesh Pathania 3/63 (38 overs)	Palam A Stadium, Delhi; Umpires: Subrat Das and Abhijit Deshmukh; Player of the match: Soumik Chatterjee (Services)
Scorecard	217/7d (57 overs); Diwesh Pathania 42* (29); Chama Milind 2/42 (15 overs)		140/3 (43 overs); Akshath Reddy 72* (117); Kamal Passi 2/34 (11 overs)	Palam A Stadium, Delhi; Umpires: Subrat Das and Abhijit Deshmukh; Player of the match: Soumik Chatterjee (Services)
Hyderabad won the toss and elected to field.; Mohammed Siraj (Hyderabad) and Amit Pachhara (Services) both made their first-class debuts.

23–26 November 2015	Hyderabad	v	Tripura	Match Drawn Hyderabad took first innings lead
Scorecard	548/5d (173 overs); Hanuma Vihari 219 (447); Manisankar Murasingh 2/82 (33 overs)		237 (82.4 overs); Arindam Das 73 (172); Ravi Kiran 3/45 (20.4 overs)	Rajiv Gandhi International Stadium, Hyderabad; Umpires: Ulhas Gandhe and Sanjay Hazare; Player of the match: Hanuma Vihari (Hyderabad)
Scorecard			294/5 (88 overs) (f/o); Parvinder Singh 104* (183); Himalay Agarwal 2/21 (4 overs)	Rajiv Gandhi International Stadium, Hyderabad; Umpires: Ulhas Gandhe and Sanjay Hazare; Player of the match: Hanuma Vihari (Hyderabad)
Tripura won the toss and elected to field.

1–4 December 2015	Hyderabad	v	Jharkhand	Jharkhand won by 10 wickets
Scorecard	145 (76.1 overs); Bavanaka Sandeep 39 (108); Jaskaran Singh 3/32 (14 overs)		388/8d (104.4 overs); Saurabh Tiwary 209* (283); Chama Milind 3/77 (22 overs)	Rajiv Gandhi International Stadium, Hyderabad; Umpires: Umesh Dubey and Nitin Pandit; Player of the match: Saurabh Tiwary (Jharkhand)
Scorecard	269 (101.4 overs); Balchander Anirudh 79* (136); Rahul Shukla 5/89 (26 overs)		29/0 (3.4 overs); Anand Singh 22* (13)	Rajiv Gandhi International Stadium, Hyderabad; Umpires: Umesh Dubey and Nitin Pandit; Player of the match: Saurabh Tiwary (Jharkhand)
Jharkhand won the toss and elected to field.

==== Statistics ====
Most runs

Player	Mat	Inns	Runs	Ave	SR	HS	100	50
Hanuma Vihari	8	13	626	48.15	42.38	219	2	2
Akshath Reddy	8	13	535	44.58	49.62	125	1	3
Balchander Anirudh	8	13	470	47.00	49.78	79*	0	6

- Source: ESPNcricinfo

Most wickets

Player	Mat	Inns	Wkts	Ave	Econ	BBI	SR	5WI	10WM
Vishal Sharma	5	7	17	30.35	2.70	4/30	67.2	0	0
Mehdi Hasan	5	8	16	33.00	2.79	5/43	70.8	2	1
Chama Milind	7	12	16	41.12	3.32	3/50	74.2	0	0

- Source: ESPNcricinfo

=== Vijay Hazare Trophy ===
Hyderabad began their campaign in Vijay Hazare Trophy, a List A cricket tournament in India, against Punjab at Hyderabad on 11 December 2015. They finished in sixth in Group A with a win and five losses.

==== Points Table ====
Group A

Team	Pld	W	L	T	NR	Pts	NRR
Tamil Nadu	6	5	1	0	0	20	+1.254
Punjab	6	5	1	0	0	20	+0.349
Mumbai	6	4	2	0	0	16	+0.866
Services	6	3	3	0	0	12	-0.321
Rajasthan	6	3	3	0	0	12	-0.772
Hyderabad	6	1	5	0	0	4	-0.454
Assam	6	0	6	0	0	0	-0.807

- Top two teams advanced to knockout stage.

==== Matches ====
Group Stage

11 December 2015	Punjab; 238 (49.4 overs)	v	Hyderabad; 182 (42.4 overs)	Punjab won by 56 runs
Scorecard	Punjab; 238 (49.4 overs)	v	Hyderabad; 182 (42.4 overs)	Rajiv Gandhi International Stadium, Hyderabad; Umpires: Anil Dandekar and Vineet Kulkarni
Scorecard	Mayank Sidhana 64 (66); Ravi Kiran 4/33 (9.4 overs)		Kolla Sumanth 63 (70); Siddarth Kaul 5/32 (8.4 overs)	Rajiv Gandhi International Stadium, Hyderabad; Umpires: Anil Dandekar and Vineet Kulkarni
Hyderabad won the toss and elected to field.; Himalay Agarwal (Hyderabad) made his List A debut.				Rajiv Gandhi International Stadium, Hyderabad; Umpires: Anil Dandekar and Vineet Kulkarni

13 December 2015	Hyderabad; 224/7 (50 overs)	v	Services; 225/5 (48.5 overs)	Services won by 5 wickets
Scorecard	Hyderabad; 224/7 (50 overs)	v	Services; 225/5 (48.5 overs)	Rajiv Gandhi International Stadium, Hyderabad; Umpires: Anil Dandekar and Kamlesh Sharma
Scorecard	Pagadala Naidu 45* (47); Azaruddin Bloch 3/34 (10 overs)		Mumtaz Qadir 68 (111); Ravi Kiran 2/41 (10 overs)	Rajiv Gandhi International Stadium, Hyderabad; Umpires: Anil Dandekar and Kamlesh Sharma
Hyderabad won the toss and elected to bat.; Yathin Reddy (Hyderabad) made his List A debut.				Rajiv Gandhi International Stadium, Hyderabad; Umpires: Anil Dandekar and Kamlesh Sharma

14 December 2015	Rajasthan; 250/8 (50 overs)	v	Hyderabad; 148 (39 overs)	Rajasthan won by 102 runs
Scorecard	Rajasthan; 250/8 (50 overs)	v	Hyderabad; 148 (39 overs)	Rajiv Gandhi International Stadium, Hyderabad; Umpires: Vineet Kulkarni and Navdeep Singh
Scorecard	Ashok Menaria 55 (52); Ravi Kiran 4/57 (10 overs)		Hanuma Vihari 39 (67); Tanveer-Ul-Haq 4/44 (9 overs)	Rajiv Gandhi International Stadium, Hyderabad; Umpires: Vineet Kulkarni and Navdeep Singh
Hyderabad won the toss and elected to field.; Jaweed Ali (Hyderabad); Siddharth Dobal and Manender Singh (Rajasthan) all made their List A debuts.				Rajiv Gandhi International Stadium, Hyderabad; Umpires: Vineet Kulkarni and Navdeep Singh

15 December 2015	Hyderabad; 271/8 (50 overs)	v	Assam; 199 (50 overs)	Hyderabad won by 72 runs
Scorecard	Hyderabad; 271/8 (50 overs)	v	Assam; 199 (50 overs)	Gymkhana Ground, Hyderabad; Umpires: Vineet Kulkarni and Navdeep Singh
Scorecard	Tanmay Agarwal 83 (77); Arup Das 3/45 (10 overs)		Pallavkumar Das 54 (61); Ravi Kiran 3/30 (9 overs)	Gymkhana Ground, Hyderabad; Umpires: Vineet Kulkarni and Navdeep Singh
Assam won the toss and elected to field.; Jogeswar Bhumij (Assam) and Balchander Anirudh (Hyderabad) both made their List A debuts.				Gymkhana Ground, Hyderabad; Umpires: Vineet Kulkarni and Navdeep Singh

17 December 2015	Hyderabad; 230 (49.2 overs)	v	Tamil Nadu; 233/7 (47.5 overs)	Tamil Nadu won by 3 wickets
Scorecard	Hyderabad; 230 (49.2 overs)	v	Tamil Nadu; 233/7 (47.5 overs)	Rajiv Gandhi International Stadium, Hyderabad; Umpires: Vineet Kulkarni and Nitin Menon
Scorecard	Tanmay Agarwal 105 (96); Lakshmipathy Balaji 3/33 (8.2 overs)		Baba Aparajith 55 (58); Mohammed Siraj 2/44 (10 overs)	Rajiv Gandhi International Stadium, Hyderabad; Umpires: Vineet Kulkarni and Nitin Menon
Tamil Nadu won the toss and elected to field.; Mohammed Siraj (Hyderabad) made his List A debut.				Rajiv Gandhi International Stadium, Hyderabad; Umpires: Vineet Kulkarni and Nitin Menon

18 December 2015	Hyderabad; 217/7 (50 overs)	v	Mumbai; 221/3 (44.2 Overs)	Mumbai won by 7 wickets
Scorecard	Hyderabad; 217/7 (50 overs)	v	Mumbai; 221/3 (44.2 Overs)	Rajiv Gandhi International Stadium, Uppal, Hyderabad; Umpires: Nitin Menon and Navdeep Singh
Scorecard	Hanuma Vihari 95 (104); Shardul Thakur 2/33 (8 overs)		Akhil Herwadkar 85 (122); Mehdi Hassan 1/36 (10 overs)	Rajiv Gandhi International Stadium, Uppal, Hyderabad; Umpires: Nitin Menon and Navdeep Singh
Hyderabad won the toss and elected to bat.				Rajiv Gandhi International Stadium, Uppal, Hyderabad; Umpires: Nitin Menon and Navdeep Singh

==== Statistics ====
Most runs

Player	Mat	Inns	Runs	Ave	SR	HS	100	50
Hanuma Vihari	6	6	235	39.16	71.64	95	0	2
Tanmay Agarwal	5	5	208	41.60	90.82	105	1	1
Kolla Sumanth	6	6	157	31.40	77.72	63*	0	1

- Source: ESPNcricinfo

Most wickets

Player	Mat	Inns	Wkts	Ave	Econ	BBI	SR	4WI	5WI
Ravi Kiran	6	6	16	16.75	4.74	4/33	21.1	2	0
Chama Milind	4	4	9	23.44	5.70	3/44	24.6	0	0
Vishal Sharma	6	6	7	35.28	4.18	2/40	50.5	0	0

- Source: ESPNcricinfo

=== Syed Mushtaq Ali Trophy ===
Hyderabad began their campaign in Syed Mushtaq Ali Trophy, a Twenty20 tournament in India, against Bengal at Nagpur on 2 January 2016. They finished in fifth in Group A with two wins and four losses.

==== Points Table ====
Group A

Team	Pld	W	L	T	NR	Pts	NRR
Vidarbha	6	5	1	0	0	20	0.017
Gujarat	6	4	2	0	0	16	1.559
Tamil Nadu	6	4	2	0	0	16	1.136
Himachal Pradesh	6	3	3	0	0	12	-0.025
Hyderabad	6	2	4	0	0	8	-0.270
Bengal	6	2	4	0	0	8	-0.786
Haryana	6	1	5	0	0	4	-1.406

- Top two teams advanced to the Super League.

==== Matches ====
Group Stage

2 January 2016	Bengal; 185/4 (20 overs)	v	Hyderabad; 124 (16.2 overs)	Bengal won by 61 runs
Scorecard	Bengal; 185/4 (20 overs)	v	Hyderabad; 124 (16.2 overs)	Vidarbha Cricket Association Ground, Nagpur; Umpires: Kamlesh Sharma and Navdeep Singh
Scorecard	Wriddhiman Saha 81 (47); Chama Milind 2/45 (4 overs)		Akshath Reddy 32 (18); Mohammad Shami 3/18 (2.2 overs)	Vidarbha Cricket Association Ground, Nagpur; Umpires: Kamlesh Sharma and Navdeep Singh
Bengal won the toss and elected to bat.; Pramod Chandila (Bengal); Jaweed Ali, Mohammed Siraj and Kolla Sumanth (Hyderabad) all made their T20 debuts.				Vidarbha Cricket Association Ground, Nagpur; Umpires: Kamlesh Sharma and Navdeep Singh

3 January 2016	Hyderabad; 140/9 (20 overs)	v	Himachal Pradesh; 126/9 (20 overs)	Hyderabad won by 14 runs
Scorecard	Hyderabad; 140/9 (20 overs)	v	Himachal Pradesh; 126/9 (20 overs)	Vidarbha Cricket Association Ground, Nagpur; Umpires: Kamlesh Sharma and Umesh Dubey
Scorecard	Ashish Reddy 37 (29); Akshay Chauhan 4/25 (4 overs)		Ankush Bains 25 (22); Chama Milind 3/34 (4 overs)	Vidarbha Cricket Association Ground, Nagpur; Umpires: Kamlesh Sharma and Umesh Dubey
Himachal Pradesh won the toss and elected to field.				Vidarbha Cricket Association Ground, Nagpur; Umpires: Kamlesh Sharma and Umesh Dubey

4 January 2016	Hyderabad; 131/7 (20 overs)	v	Gujarat; 134/7 (19.3 overs)	Gujarat won by 3 wickets
Scorecard	Hyderabad; 131/7 (20 overs)	v	Gujarat; 134/7 (19.3 overs)	Vidarbha Cricket Association Ground, Nagpur; Umpires: Nikhil Patwardhan and Navdeep Singh
Scorecard	Hanuma Vihari 32 (31); R. P. Singh 3/15 (4 overs)		Parthiv Patel 70 (40); Bavanaka Sandeep 2/14 (2.3 overs)	Vidarbha Cricket Association Ground, Nagpur; Umpires: Nikhil Patwardhan and Navdeep Singh
Hyderabad won the toss and elected to bat.; Vishal Sharma (Hyderabad) made his T20 debut.				Vidarbha Cricket Association Ground, Nagpur; Umpires: Nikhil Patwardhan and Navdeep Singh

6 January 2016	Hyderabad; 173/8 (20 overs)	v	Haryana; 138/7 (20 overs)	Hyderabad won by 35 runs
Scorecard	Hyderabad; 173/8 (20 overs)	v	Haryana; 138/7 (20 overs)	Vidarbha Cricket Association Ground, Nagpur; Umpires: Nikhil Patwardhan and Sanjay Hazare
Scorecard	Hanuma Vihari 44 (28); Yuzvendra Chahal 3/43 (4 overs)		Nitin Saini 30 (25); Hanuma Vihari 2/13 (3 overs)	Vidarbha Cricket Association Ground, Nagpur; Umpires: Nikhil Patwardhan and Sanjay Hazare
Hyderabad won the toss and elected to bat.; Chaitanya Bishnoi (Haryana) and Annabathula Akash (Hyderabad) both made their T20 debuts.				Vidarbha Cricket Association Ground, Nagpur; Umpires: Nikhil Patwardhan and Sanjay Hazare

9 January 2016	Hyderabad; 139/7 (20 overs)	v	Vidarbha; 142/5 (20 overs)	Vidarbha won by 5 wickets
Scorecard	Hyderabad; 139/7 (20 overs)	v	Vidarbha; 142/5 (20 overs)	Vidarbha Cricket Association Ground, Nagpur; Umpires: Navdeep Singh and Navdeep Singh
Scorecard	Hanuma Vihari 40 (33); Ravikumar Thakur 3/29 (4 overs)		Apoorv Wankhade 43* (31); Chama Milind 2/26 (4 overs)	Vidarbha Cricket Association Ground, Nagpur; Umpires: Navdeep Singh and Navdeep Singh
Vidarbha won the toss and elected to field.				Vidarbha Cricket Association Ground, Nagpur; Umpires: Navdeep Singh and Navdeep Singh

10 January 2016	Hyderabad; 140/8 (20 overs)	v	Tamil Nadu; 141/6 (18.4 overs)	Tamil Nadu won by 4 wickets
Scorecard	Hyderabad; 140/8 (20 overs)	v	Tamil Nadu; 141/6 (18.4 overs)	Vidarbha Cricket Association Ground, Nagpur; Umpires: Navdeep Singh and Nikhil Patwardhan
Scorecard	Jaweed Ali 35 (19); Murugan Ashwin 3/18 (4 overs)		Dinesh Karthik 43 (31); Akash Bhandari 2/20 (4 overs)	Vidarbha Cricket Association Ground, Nagpur; Umpires: Navdeep Singh and Nikhil Patwardhan
Tamil Nadu won the toss and elected to field.; Himalay Agarwal, Mehdi Hassan (Hyderabad) and Abhishek Tanwar (Tamil Nadu) all made their T20 debuts.				Vidarbha Cricket Association Ground, Nagpur; Umpires: Navdeep Singh and Nikhil Patwardhan

==== Statistics ====
Most runs

Player	Mat	Inns	Runs	Ave	SR	HS	100	50
Hanuma Vihari	6	6	170	28.33	123.18	44	0	0
Akshath Reddy	6	6	149	24.83	139.25	43	0	0
Tanmay Agarwal	6	6	84	14.00	97.67	25	0	0

- Source: ESPNcricinfo

Most wickets

Player	Mat	Inns	Wkts	Ave	Econ	BBI	SR	4WI	5WI
Chama Milind	6	6	8	24.75	9.00	3/34	16.5	0	0
Akash Bhandari	6	6	7	18.71	5.45	2/18	20.5	0	0
Mohammed Siraj	5	5	7	21.42	7.50	2/22	17.1	0	0

- Source: ESPNcricinfo

== Senior Women's team ==
=== Squads ===
- Head coach: Purnima Rao
- Assistant coach: Nooshin Al Khadeer
- Assistant coach: Savita Nirala
- Physio : Harsha Jain
- Trainer : Swathi

One-Day League	T20 League
Sravanthi Naidu (c); Sneha Morey; Diana David; Gouher Sultana; Ananya Upendran; M Shalini; Arundhati Reddy; Vellore Mahesh Kavya; D Ramya; Himani Yadav; Bhogi Shravani; Nishath Fatima (wk); Anuradha Naik (wk); Vinodha; Pranathi Reddy; N Sunitha	Sravanthi Naidu (c); Arundhati Reddy; Gouher Sultana; Pranathi Reddy; Ananya Upendran; Diana David; M Shalini; Nishath Fatima (wk); Vellore Mahesh Kavya; Sneha Morey; D Ramya; Bhogi Shravani; Anuradha; Vinodha; Himani Yadav

Senior women's cricket inter zonal three day game

Arundhati Reddy, Gouher Sultana and Vellore Mahesh Kavya got selected for South Zone squad for 2015-16 Senior women's cricket inter zonal three day game, a Women's First-class cricket tournament in India. This was the first edition to be scheduled with three-day games as the previous edition had two-day games.

=== One-Day League ===
Hyderabad began their campaign in Senior women's one day league, Women's List A cricket tournament in India, against Bengal at Panaji on 15 November 2015. They finished inside top-2 in Elite Group B with three wins and a loss to advance to Super League. They finished fourth in Super League with a win and two losses.

==== Points Table ====
Elite Group B

Team	Pld	W	L	T	NR	Pts	NRR
Maharashtra	4	3	1	0	0	12	+1.463
Hyderabad	4	3	1	0	0	12	-0.470
Delhi	4	2	2	0	0	8	-0.392
Goa	4	1	3	0	0	4	-0.184
Bengal	4	1	3	0	0	4	-0.247

Top two teams advanced to Super League.
Bottom team relegated to 2016-17 Plate Group.

Elite Super League

Team	Pld	W	L	T	NR	Pts	NRR
Railways	3	3	0	0	0	12	+1.219
Mumbai	3	1	2	0	0	4	-0.148
Maharashtra	3	1	2	0	0	4	-0.426
Hyderabad	3	1	2	0	0	4	-0.775

Champions.
Runners-up.

==== Matches ====
Group Stage

15 November 2015	Hyderabad; 133 (45.2 overs)	v	Bengal; 83 (39.2 overs)	Hyderabad won by 50 runs
Scorecard	Hyderabad; 133 (45.2 overs)	v	Bengal; 83 (39.2 overs)	Bhausaheb Bandodkar Ground, Panaji; Umpires: Bahuleyan Viswajith and Dhokre Vaibhav
Scorecard	Sneha Morey 48 (83); Saika Ishaque 5/30 (10 overs)		Trisha Bera 13 (33); Sravanthi Naidu 3/12 (7.2 overs)	Bhausaheb Bandodkar Ground, Panaji; Umpires: Bahuleyan Viswajith and Dhokre Vaibhav
Bengal won the toss and elected to field.				Bhausaheb Bandodkar Ground, Panaji; Umpires: Bahuleyan Viswajith and Dhokre Vaibhav

19 November 2015	Goa; 82 (48.3 overs)	v	Hyderabad; 83/4 (33.4 overs)	Hyderabad won by 6 wickets
Scorecard	Goa; 82 (48.3 overs)	v	Hyderabad; 83/4 (33.4 overs)	Bhausaheb Bandodkar Ground, Panaji; Umpires: K Raghuram and Dhokre Vaibhav
Scorecard	Santoshi Rane 39 (65); Sravanthi Naidu 3/19 (9.3 overs)		Vellore Mahesh Kavya 25* (64); Santoshi Rane 1/9 (5 overs)	Bhausaheb Bandodkar Ground, Panaji; Umpires: K Raghuram and Dhokre Vaibhav
Goa won the toss and elected to bat.				Bhausaheb Bandodkar Ground, Panaji; Umpires: K Raghuram and Dhokre Vaibhav

21 November 2015	Hyderabad; 62 (43 overs)	v	Delhi; 63/5 (25.1 overs)	Delhi won by 5 wickets
Scorecard	Hyderabad; 62 (43 overs)	v	Delhi; 63/5 (25.1 overs)	Bhausaheb Bandodkar Ground, Panaji; Umpires: K Raghuram and Dhokre Vaibhav
Scorecard	Arundhati Reddy 11 (49); Reema Malhotra 2/12 (4 overs)		Latika Kumari 23 (64); Arundhati Reddy 2/8 (5 overs)	Bhausaheb Bandodkar Ground, Panaji; Umpires: K Raghuram and Dhokre Vaibhav
Hyderabad won the toss and elected to bat.				Bhausaheb Bandodkar Ground, Panaji; Umpires: K Raghuram and Dhokre Vaibhav

23 November 2015	Maharashtra; 101 (50 overs)	v	Hyderabad; 86/5 (35 overs)	Hyderabad won by 5 wickets (VJD Method)
Scorecard	Maharashtra; 101 (50 overs)	v	Hyderabad; 86/5 (35 overs)	Bhausaheb Bandodkar Ground, Panaji; Umpires: K Raghuram and Mohammed Rafi
Scorecard	S R Mane 25 (67); Gouher Sultana 3/16 (10 overs)		Vellore Mahesh Kavya 50* (84); S R Mane 3/21 (8 overs)	Bhausaheb Bandodkar Ground, Panaji; Umpires: K Raghuram and Mohammed Rafi
Hyderabad won the toss and elected to field.				Bhausaheb Bandodkar Ground, Panaji; Umpires: K Raghuram and Mohammed Rafi

Super League Stage

1 December 2015	Hyderabad; 60 (37.4 overs)	v	Railways; 61/2 (24.4 overs)	Railways won by 8 wickets
Scorecard	Hyderabad; 60 (37.4 overs)	v	Railways; 61/2 (24.4 overs)	Vijaynand Ground, Hyderabad; Umpires: Sud Abhiroope and Chakravarti Indranil
Scorecard	Pranathi Reddy 16 (40); Kavita Patil 3/15 (7 overs)		Punam Raut 33* (71); Ananya Upendran 1/10 (4 overs)	Vijaynand Ground, Hyderabad; Umpires: Sud Abhiroope and Chakravarti Indranil
Railways won the toss and elected to field.				Vijaynand Ground, Hyderabad; Umpires: Sud Abhiroope and Chakravarti Indranil

2 December 2015	Maharashtra; 134/7 (50 overs)	v	Hyderabad; 135/4 (42.1 overs)	Hyderabad won by 6 wickets
Scorecard	Maharashtra; 134/7 (50 overs)	v	Hyderabad; 135/4 (42.1 overs)	Vijaynand Ground, Hyderabad; Umpires: Arumukham Sivakumar and Sud Abhiroope
Scorecard	S R Mane 34* (67); Arundhati Reddy 1/11 (6 overs)		M Shalini 44 (68); S R Mane 2/22 (5 overs)	Vijaynand Ground, Hyderabad; Umpires: Arumukham Sivakumar and Sud Abhiroope
Hyderabad won the toss and elected to field.				Vijaynand Ground, Hyderabad; Umpires: Arumukham Sivakumar and Sud Abhiroope

4 December 2015	Mumbai; 155/7 (50 overs)	v	Hyderabad; 94 (35 overs)	Mumbai won by 61 runs
Scorecard	Mumbai; 155/7 (50 overs)	v	Hyderabad; 94 (35 overs)	Gymkhana Ground, Hyderabad; Umpires: Arumukham Sivakumar and Chakravarti Indranil
Scorecard	B S Tamore 34 (41); Gouher Sultana 3/33 (10 overs)		Arundhati Reddy 38 (82); Sunetra Paranjpe 3/9 (4 overs)	Gymkhana Ground, Hyderabad; Umpires: Arumukham Sivakumar and Chakravarti Indranil
Mumbai won the toss and elected to bat.				Gymkhana Ground, Hyderabad; Umpires: Arumukham Sivakumar and Chakravarti Indranil

==== Statistics ====
Most runs

Player	Mat	Inns	Runs	Ave	SR	HS	100	50
Vellore Mahesh Kavya	7	6	93	23.25	47.93	50*	0	1
M Shalini	7	7	89	12.71	54.60	44	0	0
Sneha Morey	7	7	75	10.71	31.38	48	0	0

- Source: BCCI

Most wickets

Player	Mat	Inns	Wkts	Ave	Econ	BBI	SR	4WI	5WI
Gouher Sultana	7	7	12	10.08	2.08	3/16	29.00	0	0
Sravanthi Naidu	7	7	11	12.00	2.42	3/12	29.72	0	0
Arundhati Reddy	7	7	8	9.00	1.94	2/7	27.75	0	0

- Source: BCCI

=== T20 League ===
Hyderabad began their campaign in Senior Women's T20 League, a Women's Twenty20 cricket tournament in India, against Delhi at Kolkata on 2 January 2016. They finished in fourth in Elite Group B with two wins and two losses.

==== Points Table ====
Elite Group B

Team	Pld	W	L	T	NR	Pts	NRR
Railways	4	3	1	0	0	12	+1.613
Maharashtra	4	3	1	0	0	12	+1.231
Bengal	4	2	2	0	0	8	-0.417
Hyderabad	4	2	2	0	0	8	-1.284
Delhi	4	0	4	0	0	0	-1.190

Top two teams advanced to Super League.
Bottom team relegated to 2016-17 Plate Group.

==== Matches ====
Group Stage

2 January 2016	Delhi; 71/9 (20 overs)	v	Hyderabad; 72/3 (14.4 overs)	Hyderabad won by 7 wickets
Scorecard	Delhi; 71/9 (20 overs)	v	Hyderabad; 72/3 (14.4 overs)	Jadavpur University Campus Ground, Kolkata; Umpires: Basa Arun Kumar and Dhota Saurabh Suresh
Scorecard	Mandeep Kaur 19 (19); Gouher Sultana 2/2 (4 overs)		Sneha Morey 28 (41); Babita Negi 1/12 (3 overs)	Jadavpur University Campus Ground, Kolkata; Umpires: Basa Arun Kumar and Dhota Saurabh Suresh
Delhi won the toss and elected to bat.				Jadavpur University Campus Ground, Kolkata; Umpires: Basa Arun Kumar and Dhota Saurabh Suresh

4 January 2016	Bengal; 82 (20 overs)	v	Hyderabad; 83/8 (19.2 overs)	Hyderabad won by 2 wickets
Scorecard	Bengal; 82 (20 overs)	v	Hyderabad; 83/8 (19.2 overs)	Eden Gardens, Kolkata; Umpires: Totre Akshay and Bahuleyan Viswajith
Scorecard	Dipali Shaw 19 (30); Gouher Sultana 2/8 (3 overs)		M Shalini 24 (23); Sukanya Parida 3/12 (4 overs)	Eden Gardens, Kolkata; Umpires: Totre Akshay and Bahuleyan Viswajith
Hyderabad won the toss and elected to field.				Eden Gardens, Kolkata; Umpires: Totre Akshay and Bahuleyan Viswajith

5 January 2016	Railways; 103/3 (20 overs)	v	Hyderabad; 76/8 (20 overs)	Railways won by 27 runs
Scorecard	Railways; 103/3 (20 overs)	v	Hyderabad; 76/8 (20 overs)	Eden Gardens, Kolkata; Umpires: Basa Arun Kumar and Totre Akshay
Scorecard	Mithali Raj 41* (46); Vellore Mahesh Kavya 2/10 (3 overs)		Vellore Mahesh Kavya 20 (28); Poonam Yadav 3/17 (4 overs)	Eden Gardens, Kolkata; Umpires: Basa Arun Kumar and Totre Akshay
Railways won the toss and elected to bat.				Eden Gardens, Kolkata; Umpires: Basa Arun Kumar and Totre Akshay

6 January 2016	Hyderabad; 92 (20 overs)	v	Maharashtra; 93/8 (19.3 overs)	Maharashtra won by 2 wickets
Scorecard	Hyderabad; 92 (20 overs)	v	Maharashtra; 93/8 (19.3 overs)	Eden Gardens, Kolkata; Umpires: Basa Arun Kumar and Bahuleyan Viswajith
Scorecard	Diana David 16 (27); Devika Vaidya 3/10 (4 overs)		Anuja Patil 37 (39); Ananya Upendran 3/14 (4 overs)	Eden Gardens, Kolkata; Umpires: Basa Arun Kumar and Bahuleyan Viswajith
Maharashtra won the toss and elected to field.				Eden Gardens, Kolkata; Umpires: Basa Arun Kumar and Bahuleyan Viswajith

==== Statistics ====
Most runs

Player	Mat	Inns	Runs	Ave	SR	HS	100	50
M Shalini	4	4	54	13.50	112.50	24	0	0
Vellore Mahesh Kavya	4	4	45	15.00	70.31	20	0	0
Diana David	4	4	40	13.33	62.50	16	0	0

- Source: BCCI

Most wickets

Player	Mat	Inns	Wkts	Ave	Econ	BBI	SR	4WI	5WI
Vellore Mahesh Kavya	4	4	6	7.83	3.91	2/10	12.00	0	0
Ananya Upendran	4	4	6	9.16	3.92	3/14	14.00	0	0
Gouher Sultana	4	4	4	10.75	3.07	2/2	21.00	0	0

- Source: BCCI

== See also ==
Hyderabad cricket team
Hyderabad women's cricket team
Hyderabad Cricket Association
