= 2015–16 Vijay Hazare Trophy Group A =

Indian cricket tournament

- Dates: 10 December 2015 – 18 December 2015
- Administrator(s): BCCI
- Cricket format: List A cricket
- Tournament format(s): Round robin
- Host(s): Hyderabad
- Participants: 7
- Matches: 21

2015–16 Vijay Hazare Trophy is the 14th season of the Vijay Hazare Trophy, a List A cricket tournament in India. It is contested by 27 domestic cricket teams of India divided into 4 Groups. The winner will advance to play 2015–16 Deodhar Trophy. The top two teams advanced to the quarter-finals.

== Points Table ==
Team	Pld	W	L	T	NR	Pts	NRR
Tamil Nadu	6	5	1	0	0	20	+1.254
Punjab	6	5	1	0	0	20	+0.349
Mumbai	6	4	2	0	0	16	+0.866
Services	6	3	3	0	0	12	-0.321
Rajasthan	6	3	3	0	0	12	-0.772
Hyderabad	6	1	5	0	0	4	-0.454
Assam	6	0	6	0	0	0	-0.807

- Top two teams advanced to knockout stage

== Fixtures ==
=== Round one ===
Ravichandran Ashwin-led Tamil Nadu opened their account in the one-day tournament with a thumping win over Assam. The off-spinner claimed three wickets for 31 runs as they bowled Assam out for 210 with two balls to spare. Abhinav Mukund then anchored the innings to help the team attain the target with ease. The opener was out for 104 with just two runs needed for victory.

10 December 2015
Scorecard

Assam; 210 (49.4 overs)	v	Tamil Nadu; 214/4 (41.4 overs)
Jamaluddin Syed Mohammad 59 (93); Ravichandran Ashwin 3/31 (9.4 overs)		Abhinav Mukund 104 (104); Krishna Das 1/21 (7 overs)

Tamil Nadu won by 6 wickets
Rajiv Gandhi International Stadium, Hyderabad
Umpires: Vineet Kulkarni and Navdeep Singh

- Tamil Nadu won the toss and elected to field.
- Wasiqur Rahman (Assam); Baba Indrajith and Jagatheesan Kousik (Tamil Nadu) all made their List-A debuts.

Mumbai's debutants shone in the victory as they cantered to a comfortable win. Pacer Sagar Trivedi claimed three for 21 as Punjab posted 254 on the board. Yuvraj scored a run-a-ball 93 to take the team to a respectable total after Dhawal Kulkarni and Trivedi claimed the top-order. Debutant Jay Bista then led the chase with an 87-ball 92 while Abhishek Nayar took Mumbai across the line with an unbeaten 44.

10 December 2015
Scorecard

Punjab; 254 (48.1 overs)	v	Mumbai; 255/5 (45.1 overs)
Yuvraj Singh 93 (93); Sagar Trivedi 3/21 (7.1 overs)		Jay Bista 92 (87); Siddarth Kaul 3/58 (10 overs)

Mumbai won by 5 wickets
Gymkhana Ground, Hyderabad
Umpires: Kamlesh Sharma and Nitin Menon

- Mumbai won the toss and elected to field.
- Jay Bista, Shashank Singh, Sagar Trivedi (Mumbai); Karan Kaila and Pargat Singh (Punjab) all made their List A debuts.

Services set Rajasthan a 231-run target after being asked to bat in Secunderabad. While NB Singh claimed a four-for, Yashpal Singh 75 not out and Suraj Yadav's unbeaten 44 lower down the order. Rajat Paliwal then claimed two for 10 including the wicket of Dishant Yagnik after while Suraj and Diwesh Pathania too picked two wickets apiece to bowl Rajasthan out for a paltry 167 and claim victory.

10 December 2015
Scorecard

Services; 230/7 (50 overs)	v	Rajasthan; 167 (41.3 overs)
Yashpal Singh 75* (95); Nathu Singh 4/42 (10 overs)		Puneet Yadav 52 (87); Rajat Paliwal 2/10 (3 overs)

Services won by 63 runs
Railways Recreation Club Ground, Secunderabad
Umpires: Anil Dandekar and Jayaraman Madanagopal

- Rajasthan won the toss and elected to field.
- Nathu Singh (Rajasthan); Azaruddin Bloch, Rahul Kanojia and Sufiyan Alam (Services) all made their List A debuts.

=== Round two ===
Experienced campaigner, Rajat Bhatia's heroics with the ball and the bat helped Rajasthan to victory in a thrilling encounter. The all-rounder, claimed five for 17 to bowl the opposition out for 148 and then took Rajasthan across the line with an unbeaten 82-ball 68 in a low-scoring game. While wickets fell at regular intervals at the other end, he helped pull off a win in Hyderabad.

11 December 2015
Scorecard

Assam; 148 (44.4 overs)	v	Rajasthan; 149/9 (49.3 overs)
Pallavkumar Das 37 (73); Rajat Bhatia 5/17 (10 overs)		Rajat Bhatia 68* (82); Krishna Das 2/17 (10 overs)

Rajasthan won by 1 wicket
Railways Recreation Club Ground, Secunderabad
Umpires: Jayaraman Madanagopal and Navdeep Singh

- Rajasthan won the toss and elected to field.

Defending 238 runs Siddharth Kaul claimed five for 32 while Barinder Sran took three for 36 to keep Punjab in a commanding position. While the rest of the Hyderabad lineup crumbled, Sumnath Kolla scored 63 before retiring hurt. Hyderabad were 182 for nine when they conceded the match to Punjab.

Earlier, Punjab were helped to 238 by Mayank Siddana (64) after they were left on 75 for three. Yuvraj Singh chipped in with 36 runs while Gurkeerat Mann and Gitansh Khera contributed 35 and 30 respectively.

11 December 2015
Scorecard

Punjab; 238 (49.4 overs)	v	Hyderabad; 182 (42.4 overs)
Mayank Sidhana 64 (66); Ravi Kiran 4/33 (9.4 overs)		Kolla Sumanth 63 (70); Siddarth Kaul 5/32 (8.4 overs)

Punjab won by 56 runs
Rajiv Gandhi International Stadium, Hyderabad
Umpires: Anil Dandekar and Vineet Kulkarni

- Hyderabad won the toss and elected to field.
- Himalay Agarwal (Hyderabad) made his List A debut.

Tamil Nadu's middle-order helped the team post a stiff 313-run target for Mumbai in the second round match. The twins - Aparajith and Indrajith scored 77 and 60* respectively while Murali Vijay (55) and R Satish too scored half-centuries in the effort.

Akhil Herwadkar then got Mumbai off to a good start with a whirlwind 86-ball 107 but the rest of the lineup fumbled after his departure with the score on 141 in 22.2 overs. While Siddhesh Lad toiled to keep the innings afloat, the TN bowlers struck at the other end to push Mumbai further on the back-foot. He was the last to return to the pavilion for 47.

After skipper R Ashwin gave TN their first breakthrough, leg-spinner M Ashwin claimed three wickets including that of Herwadkar while Rahil Shah and M Mohammed claimed two wickets apiece.

11 December 2015
Scorecard

Tamil Nadu; 312/7 (50 overs)	v	Mumbai; 286 (45.2 overs)
Baba Aparajith 77 (112); Dhawal Kulkarni 3/47 (10 overs)		Akhil Herwadkar 107 (86); Murugan Ashwin 3/38 (7.2 overs)

Tamil Nadu won by 26 runs
Gymkhana Ground, Hyderabad
Umpires: Kamlesh Sharma and Nitin Menon

- Mumbai won the toss and elected to field.
- Murugan Ashwin (Tamil Nadu) made his List A debut.

=== Round three ===
13 December 2015
Scorecard

Mumbai; 198 (49.5 overs)	v	Assam; 102 (35 overs)
Shreyas Iyer 49 (65); Amit Verma 2/23 (7.5 overs)		Amit Verma 33 (48); Dhawal Kulkarni 4/19 (10 overs)

Mumbai won by 96 runs
Railways Recreation Club Ground, Secunderabad
Umpires: Jayaraman Madanagopal and Navdeep Singh

- Mumbai won the toss and elected to bat.

13 December 2015
Scorecard

Hyderabad; 224/7 (50 overs)	v	Services; 225/5 (48.5 overs)
Pagadala Naidu 45 (47); Azaruddin Bloch 3/34 (10 overs)		Mumtaz Qadir 68 (111); Ravi Kiran 2/41 (10 overs)

Services won by 5 wickets
Rajiv Gandhi International Stadium, Hyderabad
Umpires: Anil Dandekar and Kamlesh Sharma

- Hyderabad won the toss and elected to bat.
- Yathin Reddy (Hyderabad) made his List A debut.

13 December 2015
Scorecard

Tamil Nadu; 226 (45.3 overs)	v	Punjab; 230/4 (44.5 overs)
Dinesh Karthik 69 (93); Siddarth Kaul 4/17 (8 overs)		Jiwanjot Singh 85 (101); Rajagopal Sathish 2/23 (6 overs)

Punjab won by 6 wickets
Gymkhana Ground, Hyderabad
Umpires: Vineet Kulkarni and Nitin Menon

- Punjab won the toss and elected to field.
- Antony Dhas and Aswin Crist (Tamil Nadu) both made their List A debuts.

=== Round four ===
14 December 2015
Scorecard

Punjab; 327/4 (50 overs)	v	Assam; 326/8 (50 overs)
Mandeep Singh 117* (97); Amit Verma 2/61 (10 overs)		Swarupam Purkayastha 125 (112); Siddarth Kaul 3/74 (10 overs)

Punjab won by 1 run
Gymkhana Ground, Hyderabad
Umpires: Jayaraman Madanagopal and Nitin Menon

- Assam won the toss and elected to field.

14 December 2015
Scorecard

Rajasthan; 250/8 (50 overs)	v	Hyderabad; 148 (39 overs)
Manender Singh 51 (88); Ravi Kiran 4/57 (10 overs)		Hanuma Vihari 39 (67); Tanveer Ul-Haq 4/44 (9 overs)

Rajasthan won by 102 runs
Rajiv Gandhi International Stadium, Hyderabad
Umpires: Vineet Kulkarni and Navdeep Singh

- Hyderabad won the toss and elected to field.
- Jaweed Ali (Hyderabad); Sidhant Dobal and Manender Singh (Rajasthan) all made their List A debuts.

14 December 2015
Scorecard

Services; 192/8 (50 overs)	v	Tamil Nadu; 193/3 (39.4 overs)
Yashpal Singh 56* (84); M. Mohammed 5/50 (10 overs)		Abhinav Mukund 85 (110); Diwesh Pathania 3/41 (9.4 overs)

Tamil Nadu won by 7 wickets
Railways Recreation Club Ground, Secunderabad
Umpires: Anil Dandekar and Kamlesh Sharma

- Tamil Nadu won the toss and elected to field.

=== Round five ===
15 December 2015
Scorecard

Hyderabad; 271/8 (50 overs)	v	Assam; 199 (50 overs)
Tanmay Agarwal 83 (77); Arup Das 3/45 (10 overs)		Pallavkumar Das 54 (61); Ravi Kiran 3/30 (9 overs)

Hyderabad won by 72 runs
Gymkhana Ground, Hyderabad
Umpires: Vineet Kulkarni and Navdeep Singh

- Assam won the toss and elected to field.
- Jogeswar Bhumij (Assam) and Balchander Anirudh (Hyderabad) both made their List A debuts.

15 December 2015
Scorecard

Services; 151 (42.1 overs)	v	Mumbai; 156/4 (25.2 overs)
Nakul Verma 50 (93); Shardul Thakur 4/19 (7.1 overs)		Akhil Herwadkar 46 (78); Azaruddin Bloch 2/27 (7.2 overs)

Mumbai won by 6 wickets
Rajiv Gandhi International Stadium, Hyderabad
Umpires: Nitin Menon and Belur Ravi

- Mumbai won the toss and elected to field.
- Nitin Yadav (Services) made his List A debut.

15 December 2015
Scorecard

Rajasthan; 270/7 (50 overs)	v	Punjab; 273/4 (44.4 overs)
Manender Singh 118 (129); Barinder Sran 4/60 (9 overs)		Yuvraj Singh 78* (59); Sidhant Dobal 2/27 (5 overs)

Punjab won by 6 wickets
Railways Recreation Club Ground, Secunderabad
Umpires: Anil Dandekar and Jayaraman Madanagopal

- Punjab won the toss and elected to field.

=== Round six ===
17 December 2015
Scorecard

Assam; 261/8 (50 overs)	v	Services; 262/4 (45.2 overs)
Amit Verma 78 (99); Diwesh Pathania 5/54 (10 overs)		Amit Pachhara 75* (88); Jogeswar Bhumij 2/47 (9 overs)

Services won by 6 wickets
Railways Recreation Club Ground, Secunderabad
Umpires: Anil Dandekar and Belur Ravi

- Assam won the toss and elected to bat.
- Bikash Chetri (Assam) and Amit Pachhara (Services) both made their List A debuts.

17 December 2015
Scorecard

Hyderabad; 230 (49.2 overs)	v	Tamil Nadu; 233/7 (47.5 overs)
Tanmay Agarwal 105 (96); Lakshmipathy Balaji 3/33 (8.2 overs)		Baba Aparajith 55 (58); Mohammed Siraj 2/44 (10 overs)

Tamil Nadu won by 3 wickets
Rajiv Gandhi International Stadium, Hyderabad
Umpires: Vineet Kulkarni and Nitin Menon

- Tamil Nadu won the toss and elected to field.
- Mohammed Siraj (Hyderabad) made his List A debut.

17 December 2015
Scorecard

Mumbai; 301/9 (50 overs)	v	Rajasthan; 305/5 (49 overs)
Ajinkya Rahane 114 (112); Pankaj Singh 4/55 (10 overs)		Rajat Bhatia 94* (71); Abhishek Nayar 2/28 (10 overs)

Rajasthan won by 5 wickets
Gymkhana Ground, Hyderabad
Umpires: Jayaraman Madanagopal and Navdeep Singh

- Rajasthan won the toss and elected to field.
- S. F. Khan (Rajasthan) made his List A debut.

=== Round seven ===
18 December 2015
Scorecard

Hyderabad; 217/7 (50 overs)	v	Mumbai; 221/3 (44.2 Overs)
Hanuma Vihari 95 (104); Shardul Thakur 2/33 (8 overs)		Akhil Herwadkar 85 (122); Mehdi Hassan 1/36 (10 overs)

Mumbai won by 7 wickets
Rajiv Gandhi International Stadium, Uppal, Hyderabad
Umpires: Nitin Menon and Navdeep Singh

- Hyderabad won the toss and elected to bat.

18 December 2015
Scorecard

Services; 323/7 (50 overs)	v	Punjab; 325/7 (49 overs)
Nakul Verma 113 (125); Harbhajan Singh 1/41 (10 overs)		Yuvraj Singh 98 (83); Ritesh Negi 3/51 (7 overs)

Punjab won by 3 wickets
Railways Recreation Club Ground, Secunderabad
Umpires: Jayaraman Madanagopal and Belur Ravi

- Punjab won the toss and elected to field.
- Kamal Passi (Services) made his List A debut.

18 December 2015
Scorecard

Rajasthan; 384/7 (50 overs)	v	Tamil Nadu; 132 (26.2 overs)
Baba Aparajith 137 (122); Tanveer Ul-Haq 3/81 (9 overs)		Rajat Bhatia 29 (46); Rahil Shah 6/37 (8.2 overs)

Tamil Nadu won by 252 runs
Gymkhana Ground, Hyderabad
Umpires: Anil Dandekar and Vineet Kulkarni

- Rajasthan won the toss and elected to field.
