= 2017–18 Hyderabad C.A. season =

Cricket team season

Hyderabad C.A.
2017–18 season
- Coach: J. Arunkumar (Senior men's); Savita Nirala (Senior women's)
- Captain: Ambati Rayudu (Senior men's); Gouher Sultana (Senior women's)
- Ground(s): Rajiv Gandhi International Cricket Stadium, Hyderabad (Capacity: 55,000)
- Ranji Trophy: Group A (4th)
- One-Day League: Elite Group A (3rd)
- Syed Mushtaq Ali Trophy: South Zone (4th)
- T20 League: Elite Group B (5th) (Relegated)
- Vijay Hazare Trophy: Quarter-finals

The 2017–18 season is Hyderabad cricket team's 84th competitive season. The Hyderabad cricket team and Hyderabad women's cricket team are senior men's and women's domestic cricket teams based in the city of Hyderabad, India, run by the Hyderabad Cricket Association. They represent the state of Telangana in domestic competitions.

== Competition overview ==
Category	Competition	Format	First match	Last match	Final position	Pld	W	L	D / T / NR	Win %
Senior men's	Ranji Trophy	First-class cricket	6 October 2017	25 November 2017	Group Stage	6	2	1	3	33.33%
Senior women's	One-Day League	Women's List A cricket	6 December 2017	12 December 2017	Elite Group Stage	4	1	3	0	25%
Senior men's	Syed Mushtaq Ali Trophy	Twenty20 cricket	8 January 2018	14 January 2018	Zonal Stage	5	2	3	0	40%
Senior women's	T20 League	Women's Twenty20 cricket	13 January 2018	17 January 2018	Elite Group Stage	4	0	4	0	0%
Senior men's	Vijay Hazare Trophy	List A cricket	5 February 2018	21 February 2018	Quarter-finals	7	5	2	0	71.42%

== Senior Men's team ==
=== Squads ===
- Head coach: J. Arunkumar
- Assistant coach : Narender Pal Singh
- Physio : Bheesham Pratap Singh
- Trainer : Naveen Reddy
- Video analyst : Santosh BM

Buchi Babu Tournament	Ranji Trophy	Syed Mushtaq Ali Trophy	Vijay Hazare Trophy
Akshath Reddy (c); Tanmay Agarwal; Rohit Rayudu; Bavanaka Sandeep; Kolla Sumanth (wk); Ashish Reddy; Akash Bhandari; Mehdi Hasan; Ravi Kiran; Mohammad Muddassir; Tilak Varma; Rohit Reddy; Amol Shinde; Sudeep Tyagi; Gangam Anikethreddy	Ambati Rayudu (c); Kolla Sumanth (wk); Tanmay Agarwal; Ashish Reddy; Akash Bhandari; Mehdi Hasan; Chama Milind; Mohammad Muddassir; Mohammad Siraj; Pragyan Ojha; Ravi Kiran; Akshath Reddy; Rohit Rayudu; Palakodeti Sairam; Bavanaka Sandeep; Amol Shinde; Sudeep Tyagi	Ambati Rayudu (c); Akshath Reddy; Tanmay Agarwal; Ashish Reddy; Akash Bhandari; Mehdi Hasan; Kartikeya Kak; Mohammad Siraj; Pragyan Ojha; Ravi Kiran; Ravi Teja; Rohit Rayudu; Palakodeti Sairam; Bavanaka Sandeep; Kolla Sumanth (wk); Tanay Thyagarajan	Akshath Reddy (c); Bavanaka Sandeep; Tanmay Agarwal; Akash Bhandari; Chaitanya Reddy; Mehdi Hasan; Jaweed Ali; Mohammad Muddassir; Mohammad Siraj; Ravi Kiran; Ravi Teja; Ambati Rayudu; Rohit Rayudu; Palakodeti Sairam; Kolla Sumanth (wk); Tanay Thyagarajan

Ambati Rayudu moved back from the Vidarbha to lead the Hyderabad while Balchander Anirudh moved from the Hyderabad to the Tamil Nadu and S Badrinath had opted to take a year-off from the first-class cricket ahead of the 2017–18 season. The Hyderabad team also got the new coach with J. Arunkumar replacing Bharat Arun.

Duleep Trophy

Rayudu and Chama Milind got selected for India Red squad while Mohammad Siraj got selected for India Green squad for 2017-18 Duleep Trophy, a first-class cricket tournament in India. Ambati Rayudu missed the tournament because of knee injury while Mohammad Siraj was released from India Green squad as he got selected for India-A series.

Deodhar Trophy

Rohit Rayudu got selected for India A squad for 2017-18 Deodhar Trophy, a List A cricket competition in India.

Indian Premier League

Among 13 players who got their names for the IPL Auction, Ambati Rayudu got picked by Chennai Super Kings and Mohammed Siraj by Royal Challengers Bangalore while local franchise, SunRisers Hyderabad picked Mehdi Hasan and Tanmay Agarwal for 2018 Indian Premier League season.

=== Buchi Babu Tournament ===
Hyderabad was invited for 2017–18 Kalpathi AGS - Buchi Babu Invitational Tournament, invitational tournament conducted annually by Tamil Nadu Cricket Association in the honour of M. Buchi Babu Naidu and began their campaign against Baroda at Chennai on 5 September 2017. They topped Group C with two wins in as many matches to advance to knockout stage. They won the tournament defeating TNCA Presidents XI by 8 wickets in final. Kolla Sumanth was later named as the player of the tournament.

==== Points Table ====
Group C

Team	Pld	W	L	T	NR	Pts	NRR
Hyderabad	2	2	0	0	0	8	+0.814
Baroda	2	1	1	0	0	4	-0.501
TNCA XI	2	0	2	0	0	0	-0.569

- Top team advanced to the knockout stage.

==== Matches ====
Group Stage

5 September 2017	Hyderabad; 308/8 (90 overs)	v	Baroda; 309/4 (65.2 overs)	Hyderabad won by 6 wickets
09:00 IST; Scorecard	Hyderabad; 308/8 (90 overs)	v	Baroda; 309/4 (65.2 overs)	MRF Pachyappas Ground, Chennai; Umpires: Dharmaseelan and G K Arun Kumar
09:00 IST; Scorecard	Abhijit Karambelkar 100 (152); Mehdi Hasan 4/117 (34 overs)		Kolla Sumanth 82 (121); Shlok Desai 2/35 (5.2 overs)	MRF Pachyappas Ground, Chennai; Umpires: Dharmaseelan and G K Arun Kumar
Baroda won the toss and elected to bat.				MRF Pachyappas Ground, Chennai; Umpires: Dharmaseelan and G K Arun Kumar

8 September 2017	Hyderabad; 354/9 (90 overs)	v	TNCA XI; 266 (75.4 overs)	Hyderabad won by 88 runs
09:00 IST; Scorecard	Hyderabad; 354/9 (90 overs)	v	TNCA XI; 266 (75.4 overs)	SRMC Ground, Chennai; Umpires: V Anand and P Rajkumar
09:00 IST; Scorecard	Kolla Sumanth 103 (150); Aushik Srinivas 5/103 (33 overs)		Yo Mahesh 64 (103); Mehdi Hasan 5/78 (31.4 overs)	SRMC Ground, Chennai; Umpires: V Anand and P Rajkumar
TNCA XI won the toss and elected to field.				SRMC Ground, Chennai; Umpires: V Anand and P Rajkumar

Semi-final

11 September 2017	Hyderabad; 329 (81.2 overs)	v	Uttar Pradesh; 190 (60.1 overs)	Hyderabad won by 139 runs
09:00 IST; Scorecard	Hyderabad; 329 (81.2 overs)	v	Uttar Pradesh; 190 (60.1 overs)	MRF Pachyappas Ground, Chennai; Umpires: Mohammed Rafi and Khalid Sayeed
09:00 IST; Scorecard	Bavanaka Sandeep 84 (148); Zeeshan Ansari 5/112 (25.2 overs)		Eklavya Dwivedi 55 (117); Ravi Kiran 3/16 (12 overs)	MRF Pachyappas Ground, Chennai; Umpires: Mohammed Rafi and Khalid Sayeed
Hyderabad won the toss and elected to bat.				MRF Pachyappas Ground, Chennai; Umpires: Mohammed Rafi and Khalid Sayeed

Final

14 September 2017	TNCA Presidents XI; 200 (56.1 overs)	v	Hyderabad; 201/2 (56.4 overs)	Hyderabad won by 8 wickets
09:00 IST; Scorecard	TNCA Presidents XI; 200 (56.1 overs)	v	Hyderabad; 201/2 (56.4 overs)	SSN College Ground, Chennai; Umpires: Krishnamachari Srinivasan and R Rajesh Kannan
09:00 IST; Scorecard	Washington Sundar 45 (82); Sudeep Tyagi 2/33 (10 overs)		Kolla Sumanth 77* (115); Velidi Lakshman 1/24 (7 overs)	SSN College Ground, Chennai; Umpires: Krishnamachari Srinivasan and R Rajesh Kannan
Hyderabad won the toss and elected to field.				SSN College Ground, Chennai; Umpires: Krishnamachari Srinivasan and R Rajesh Kannan

==== Statistics ====
Most runs

Player	Mat	Inns	Runs	Ave	SR	HS	100	50
Kolla Sumanth	4	4	345	172.50	71.88	103*	1	3
Tanmay Agarwal	4	4	259	64.75	66.93	82	0	3
Rohit Rayudu	4	4	176	88.00	53.50	65*	0	1

Most wickets

Player	Mat	Inns	Wkts	Ave	Econ	BBI	SR	4WI	5WI
Mehdi Hasan	4	4	12	26.83	3.11	5/78	51.83	1	1
Amol Shinde	4	4	8	17.38	3.30	4/56	31.63	1	0
Akash Bhandari	4	4	7	30.14	3.90	2/7	46.43	0	0

=== Ranji Trophy ===
Hyderabad began their campaign in Ranji Trophy, the premier first-class cricket tournament in India, against Maharashtra at Hyderabad on 6 October 2017. They finished in fourth in Group A with two wins, a draw and a loss while two home matches, one against Maharashtra and the other against Uttar Pradesh, were abandoned due to incessant rains.

==== Points Table ====
Group A

Team	Pld	W	L	D	A	Pts	NRR
Karnataka	6	4	0	2	0	32	+0.479
Delhi	6	3	0	3	0	27	+0.333
Maharashtra	6	2	2	1	1	16	+0.084
Hyderabad	6	2	1	1	2	16	–0.156
Railways	6	2	3	1	0	14	–0.312
Uttar Pradesh	6	0	3	2	1	5	+0.508
Assam	6	0	4	2	0	2	–0.977

- Top two teams advanced to the knockout stage.

==== Matches ====
Group Stage

6–9 October 2017	Hyderabad	v	Maharashtra	Match Abandoned
Scorecard				Gymkhana Ground, Hyderabad; Umpires: Navdeep Singh and Virender Sharma
No toss.; No play was possible due to rain.

14–17 October 2017	Hyderabad	v	Uttar Pradesh	Match Abandoned
Scorecard				Gymkhana Ground, Hyderabad; Umpires: Pashchim Pathak and Amiesh Saheba
No toss.; No play was possible due to rain.

24–27 October 2017	Karnataka	v	Hyderabad	Karnataka won by 59 runs
Scorecard	183 (62.2 overs); Stuart Binny 61 (88); Mohammed Siraj 4/42 (15 overs)		136 (64.4 overs); Kolla Sumanth 68 (150); Shreyas Gopal 5/17 (9.4 overs)	KSCA Navule Stadium, Shimoga; Umpires: Navdeep Singh and Pashchim Pathak; Player of the match: Karun Nair (Karnataka)
Scorecard	332 (105.4); Karun Nair 134 (229); Mehdi Hasan 5/88 (36 overs)		320 (109.4 overs); Bavanaka Sandeep 80 (205); Shreyas Gopal 4/91 (18.4 overs)	KSCA Navule Stadium, Shimoga; Umpires: Navdeep Singh and Pashchim Pathak; Player of the match: Karun Nair (Karnataka)
Karnataka won the toss and elected to bat.

1–4 November 2017	Hyderabad	v	Railways	Hyderabad won by 10 wickets
Scorecard	474/9d (151 overs); Ambati Rayudu 112 (189); Manish Rao 3/76 (19 overs)		246 (94.2 overs); Anureet Singh 60 (95); Ravi Teja 5/49 (18.2 overs)	Karnail Singh Stadium, Delhi; Umpires: Stephen Harris and Pashchim Pathak; Player of the match: Ravi Teja (Hyderabad)
Scorecard	23/0 (5.2 overs); Tanmay Agarwal 15* (16)		250 (72 overs) (f/o); Manish Rao 85* (128); Mehdi Hasan 4/35 (17 overs)	Karnail Singh Stadium, Delhi; Umpires: Stephen Harris and Pashchim Pathak; Player of the match: Ravi Teja (Hyderabad)
Railways won the toss and elected to field.; Manish Rao (Railways), Rohit Rayudu and Ravi Teja (Hyderabad) all made their first-class debuts.

17–20 November 2017	Hyderabad	v	Assam	Hyderabad won by 4 wickets
Scorecard	326 (90.5 overs); Bavanaka Sandeep 84 (122); Arup Das 5/112 (28.5 overs)		136 (48.5 overs); Gokul Sharma 39 (72); Mohammad Muddassir 5/36 (11.5 overs)	Dr. Bhupen Hazarika Cricket Stadium, Guwahati; Umpires: Sudhir Asnani and Tapan Sharma; Player of the match: Ambati Rayudu (Hyderabad)
Scorecard	144/6 (39 overs); Ambati Rayudu 52* (73); Arup Das 2/21 (7 overs)		331 (109 overs) (f/o); Amit Sinha 122 (233); Sudeep Tyagi 3/34 (16 overs)	Dr. Bhupen Hazarika Cricket Stadium, Guwahati; Umpires: Sudhir Asnani and Tapan Sharma; Player of the match: Ambati Rayudu (Hyderabad)
Assam won the toss and elected to field.; Rajat Khan, Riyan Parag (Assam) and Mohammad Muddassir (Hyderabad) all made their first-class debuts.

25–28 November 2017	Delhi	v	Hyderabad	Match Drawn Delhi took first innings lead
Scorecard	415 (107.4 overs); Himmat Singh 99 (151); Ravi Kiran 3/83 (27 overs)		205 (74.2 overs); Tanmay Agarwal 63 (159); Vikas Mishra 4/36 (10.2 overs)	Rajiv Gandhi International Cricket Stadium, Hyderabad; Umpires: Anil Dandekar and Pashchim Pathak; Player of the match: Vikas Mishra (Delhi)
Scorecard			442/8 (155.1 overs) (f/o); Akshath Reddy 107 (235); Vikas Mishra 5/116 (34 overs)	Rajiv Gandhi International Cricket Stadium, Hyderabad; Umpires: Anil Dandekar and Pashchim Pathak; Player of the match: Vikas Mishra (Delhi)
Delhi won the toss and elected to bat.; Palakodeti Sairam (Hyderabad), Kunal Chandela and Akash Sudan (Delhi) all made their first-class debuts.

==== Statistics ====
Most runs

Player	Mat	Inns	Runs	Ave	SR	HS	100	50
Bavanaka Sandeep	4	7	400	57.14	46.08	93	0	4
Ambati Rayudu	3	5	278	69.50	54.19	112	1	2
Akshath Reddy	4	8	238	34.00	45.07	107	1	1

- Source: ESPNcricinfo

Most wickets

Player	Mat	Inns	Wkts	Ave	Econ	BBI	SR	5WI	10WM
Ravi Kiran	4	7	16	23.12	2.80	3/30	49.4	0	0
Mehdi Hasan	4	7	15	21.46	2.50	5/88	51.4	1	0
Ravi Teja	3	5	8	26.87	2.85	5/49	56.5	1	0

- Source: ESPNcricinfo

=== Syed Mushtaq Ali Trophy ===
Hyderabad began their campaign in Syed Mushtaq Ali Trophy, a Twenty20 tournament in India, against Kerala at Vizianagaram on 8 January 2018. They finished in fourth in South Zone with two wins and three losses.

==== Points Table ====
South Zone

Team	Pld	W	L	T	NR	Pts	NRR
Karnataka	5	4	1	0	0	16	+1.354
Tamil Nadu	5	4	1	0	0	16	+0.435
Andhra	5	4	1	0	0	16	+0.109
Hyderabad	5	2	3	0	0	8	–0.074
Kerala	5	1	4	0	0	4	-0.375
Goa	5	0	5	0	0	0	–1.499

- Top two teams advanced to the Super League.

==== Matches ====
Zonal Stage

8 January 2018	Hyderabad; 168/5 (20 overs)	v	Kerala; 158/7 (20 overs)	Hyderabad won by 10 runs
Scorecard	Hyderabad; 168/5 (20 overs)	v	Kerala; 158/7 (20 overs)	Dr PVG Raju ACA Sports Complex, Vizianagaram; Umpires: Pashchim Pathak and Tapan Sharma
Scorecard	Ambati Rayudu 52* (31); Jalaj Saxena 2/28 (4 overs)		Sachin Baby 79 (50); Ravi Kiran 3/28 (4 overs)	Dr PVG Raju ACA Sports Complex, Vizianagaram; Umpires: Pashchim Pathak and Tapan Sharma
Kerala won the toss and elected to field.; Salman Nizar (Kerala) made his T20 debut.				Dr PVG Raju ACA Sports Complex, Vizianagaram; Umpires: Pashchim Pathak and Tapan Sharma

9 January 2018	Hyderabad; 181/5 (20 overs)	v	Goa; 162/9 (20 overs)	Hyderabad won by 19 runs
Scorecard	Hyderabad; 181/5 (20 overs)	v	Goa; 162/9 (20 overs)	Dr. Y.S. Rajasekhara Reddy ACA-VDCA Cricket Stadium, Visakhapatnam; Umpires: Anil Dandekar and Ulhas Gandhe
Scorecard	Akshath Reddy 64 (40); Felix Alemao 2/35 (4 overs)		Sagun Kamat 47 (40); Ravi Kiran 4/23 (4 overs)	Dr. Y.S. Rajasekhara Reddy ACA-VDCA Cricket Stadium, Visakhapatnam; Umpires: Anil Dandekar and Ulhas Gandhe
Hyderabad won the toss and elected to field.				Dr. Y.S. Rajasekhara Reddy ACA-VDCA Cricket Stadium, Visakhapatnam; Umpires: Anil Dandekar and Ulhas Gandhe

11 January 2018	Karnataka; 205/5 (20 overs)	v	Hyderabad; 203/9 (20 overs)	Karnataka won by 2 runs
Scorecard	Karnataka; 205/5 (20 overs)	v	Hyderabad; 203/9 (20 overs)	Dr. Y.S. Rajasekhara Reddy ACA-VDCA Cricket Stadium, Visakhapatnam; Umpires: Abhijit Deshmukh and Ulhas Gandhe
Scorecard	Karun Nair 77 (42); Ravi Kiran 2/33 (4 overs)		Akshath Reddy 70 (29); Stuart Binny 3/29 (4 overs)	Dr. Y.S. Rajasekhara Reddy ACA-VDCA Cricket Stadium, Visakhapatnam; Umpires: Abhijit Deshmukh and Ulhas Gandhe
Hyderabad won the toss and elected to field.				Dr. Y.S. Rajasekhara Reddy ACA-VDCA Cricket Stadium, Visakhapatnam; Umpires: Abhijit Deshmukh and Ulhas Gandhe

12 January 2018	Hyderabad; 129/9 (20 overs)	v	Andhra; 133/4 (18.2 overs)	Andhra won by 6 wickets
Scorecard	Hyderabad; 129/9 (20 overs)	v	Andhra; 133/4 (18.2 overs)	Dr. Y.S. Rajasekhara Reddy ACA-VDCA Cricket Stadium, Visakhapatnam; Umpires: Anil Dandekar and Kamlesh Sharma
Scorecard	Bavanaka Sandeep 39 (35); Harishankar Reddy 3/30 (4 overs)		Ricky Bhui 73* (53); Mohammed Siraj 3/26 (4 overs)	Dr. Y.S. Rajasekhara Reddy ACA-VDCA Cricket Stadium, Visakhapatnam; Umpires: Anil Dandekar and Kamlesh Sharma
Hyderabad won the toss and elected to bat.				Dr. Y.S. Rajasekhara Reddy ACA-VDCA Cricket Stadium, Visakhapatnam; Umpires: Anil Dandekar and Kamlesh Sharma

14 January 2018	Tamil Nadu; 193/7 (20 overs)	v	Hyderabad; 177/8 (20 overs)	Tamil Nadu won by 16 runs
Scorecard	Tamil Nadu; 193/7 (20 overs)	v	Hyderabad; 177/8 (20 overs)	Dr. Y.S. Rajasekhara Reddy ACA-VDCA Cricket Stadium, Visakhapatnam; Umpires: Kamlesh Sharma and Virender Sharma
Scorecard	Sanjay Yadav 42 (28); Mehdi Hasan 3/40 (4 overs)		Tanmay Agarwal 59 (35); Washington Sundar 3/29 (4 overs)	Dr. Y.S. Rajasekhara Reddy ACA-VDCA Cricket Stadium, Visakhapatnam; Umpires: Kamlesh Sharma and Virender Sharma
Hyderabad won the toss and elected to field.; Tanay Thyagarajan (Hyderabad) made his T20 debut.				Dr. Y.S. Rajasekhara Reddy ACA-VDCA Cricket Stadium, Visakhapatnam; Umpires: Kamlesh Sharma and Virender Sharma

==== Statistics ====
Most runs

Player	Mat	Inns	Runs	Ave	SR	HS	100	50
Akshath Reddy	5	5	184	36.80	155.93	70	0	2
Ambati Rayudu	5	5	181	45.25	141.40	53	0	2
Tanmay Agarwal	5	5	151	30.20	145.19	59	0	1

- Source: ESPNcricinfo

Most wickets

Player	Mat	Inns	Wkts	Ave	Econ	BBI	SR	4WI	5WI
Ravi Kiran	5	5	10	14.30	7.39	4/23	11.6	1	0
Mohammed Siraj	5	5	10	17.10	8.55	3/26	12.0	0	0
Mehdi Hasan	5	5	6	24.83	7.84	3/40	19.0	0	0

- Source: ESPNcricinfo

=== Vijay Hazare Trophy ===
Hyderabad began their campaign in Vijay Hazare Trophy, a List A cricket tournament in India, against Services at Hyderabad on 5 February 2018. They topped Group D with five wins and a loss to advance to knockout stage. They were eliminated in Quarter-finals where Karnataka defeated Hyderabad by 103 runs. Mohammed Siraj was the highest wicket-taker of the tournament with the total scalps of 23 in seven matches.

==== Points Table ====
Group D

Team	Pld	W	L	T	NR	Pts	NRR
Hyderabad	6	5	1	0	0	20	+0.646
Saurashtra	6	4	2	0	0	16	+1.017
Vidarbha	6	4	2	0	0	16	+0.718
Chhattisgarh	6	4	2	0	0	16	–0.103
Jharkhand	6	2	4	0	0	8	+0.325
Jammu & Kashmir	6	2	4	0	0	8	–1.040
Services	6	0	6	0	0	0	–1.508

- Top two teams advanced to the knockout stage.

==== Knockout stage ====
Quarterfinals
D1	Hyderabad	244 (42.5 overs)
A2	Karnataka	347/8 (50 overs)
C2	Mumbai	222/9 (50 overs)
B1	Maharashtra	224/3 (46.5 overs)
A1	Baroda	247/8 (50 overs)
D2	Saurashtra	251/7 (48.4 overs)
C1	Andhra	112/4 (28.4 overs)
B2	Delhi	111 (32.1 overs)

Semifinals
A2	Karnataka	164/1 (30.3 overs)
B1	Maharashtra	160 (44.3 overs)
D2	Saurashtra	255 (49.1 overs)
C1	Andhra	196 (45.3 overs)

Final
A2	Karnataka	253 (45.5 overs)
D2	Saurashtra	212 (46.3 overs)

==== Matches ====
Group Stage

5 February 2018	Hyderabad; 329/5 (50 overs)	v	Services; 201 (40.4 overs)	Hyderabad won by 128 runs
09:00 IST; Scorecard	Hyderabad; 329/5 (50 overs)	v	Services; 201 (40.4 overs)	Rajiv Gandhi International Stadium, Hyderabad; Umpires: Sudhir Asnani and Subrat Das
09:00 IST; Scorecard	Akshath Reddy 127 (116); Raushan Raj 2/57 (10 overs)		Rahul Singh 64 (92); Mohammed Siraj 5/45 (9.4 overs)	Rajiv Gandhi International Stadium, Hyderabad; Umpires: Sudhir Asnani and Subrat Das
Services won the toss and elected to field.; Rohit Rayudu, Chaitanya Reddy, Ravi Teja (Hyderabad), Lakhan Singh, Nakul Sharma, Hardik Sethi, Vikas Yadav and Sagar Sharma (Services) all made their List A debuts.				Rajiv Gandhi International Stadium, Hyderabad; Umpires: Sudhir Asnani and Subrat Das

6 February 2018	Hyderabad; 333/7 (50 overs)	v	Jharkhand; 267 (46.5 overs)	Hyderabad won by 66 runs
09:00 IST; Scorecard	Hyderabad; 333/7 (50 overs)	v	Jharkhand; 267 (46.5 overs)	Rajiv Gandhi International Stadium, Hyderabad; Umpires: Sudhir Asnani and Amiesh Saheba
09:00 IST; Scorecard	Rohit Rayudu 126 (135); Rahul Shukla 2/69 (9 overs)		Atul Singh Surwar 58* (57); Ravi Kiran 2/41 (7.5 overs)	Rajiv Gandhi International Stadium, Hyderabad; Umpires: Sudhir Asnani and Amiesh Saheba
Jharkhand won the toss and elected to field.				Rajiv Gandhi International Stadium, Hyderabad; Umpires: Sudhir Asnani and Amiesh Saheba

8 February 2018	Vidarbha; 350/6 (50 overs)	v	Hyderabad; 113 (34.2 overs)	Vidarbha won by 237 runs
09:00 IST; Scorecard	Vidarbha; 350/6 (50 overs)	v	Hyderabad; 113 (34.2 overs)	Rajiv Gandhi International Stadium, Hyderabad; Umpires: Amiesh Saheba and Subroto Das
09:00 IST; Scorecard	Faiz Fazal 103 (97); Ravi Teja 2/53 (10 overs)		Kolla Sumanth 30 (47); Karn Sharma 3/38 (10 overs)	Rajiv Gandhi International Stadium, Hyderabad; Umpires: Amiesh Saheba and Subroto Das
Vidarbha won the toss and elected to bat.				Rajiv Gandhi International Stadium, Hyderabad; Umpires: Amiesh Saheba and Subroto Das

9 February 2018	Saurashtra; 277/7 (50 overs)	v	Hyderabad; 278/6 (49.3 overs)	Hyderabad won by 4 wickets
09:00 IST; Scorecard	Saurashtra; 277/7 (50 overs)	v	Hyderabad; 278/6 (49.3 overs)	Rajiv Gandhi International Stadium, Hyderabad; Umpires: Sudhir Asnani and Subrat Das
09:00 IST; Scorecard	Prerak Mankad 62 (63); Mohammed Siraj 3/46 (10 overs)		Akshath Reddy 94 (96); Shaurya Sanandia 2/41 (7.3 overs)	Rajiv Gandhi International Stadium, Hyderabad; Umpires: Sudhir Asnani and Subrat Das
Saurashtra won the toss and elected to bat.; Palakodeti Sairam (Hyderabad) made his List A debut.				Rajiv Gandhi International Stadium, Hyderabad; Umpires: Sudhir Asnani and Subrat Das

12 February 2018	Hyderabad; 312 (50 overs)	v	Jammu & Kashmir; 163 (34.1 overs)	Hyderabad won by 149 runs
09:00 IST; Scorecard	Hyderabad; 312 (50 overs)	v	Jammu & Kashmir; 163 (34.1 overs)	Rajiv Gandhi International Stadium, Hyderabad; Umpires: Sudhir Asnani and Subroto Das
09:00 IST; Scorecard	Rohit Rayudu 130 (130); Umar Nazir 5/52 (10 overs)		Puneet Kumar 43 (34); Akash Bhandari 3/34 (4 overs)	Rajiv Gandhi International Stadium, Hyderabad; Umpires: Sudhir Asnani and Subroto Das
Hyderabad won the toss and elected to bat.; Puneet Kumar and Deepak Dogra (Jammu & Kashmir) both made their List A debuts.				Rajiv Gandhi International Stadium, Hyderabad; Umpires: Sudhir Asnani and Subroto Das

14 February 2018	Hyderabad; 280/8 (50 overs)	v	Chhattisgarh; 196 (44.3 overs)	Hyderabad won by 84 runs
09:00 IST; Scorecard	Hyderabad; 280/8 (50 overs)	v	Chhattisgarh; 196 (44.3 overs)	Gymkhana Ground, Secunderabad; Umpires: Sudhir Asnani and Amiesh Saheba
09:00 IST; Scorecard	Bavanaka Sandeep 79 (95); Pankaj Rao 3/52 (10 overs)		Amandeep Khare 71 (90); Mohammed Siraj 5/37 (8.3 overs)	Gymkhana Ground, Secunderabad; Umpires: Sudhir Asnani and Amiesh Saheba
Hyderabad won the toss and elected to bat.				Gymkhana Ground, Secunderabad; Umpires: Sudhir Asnani and Amiesh Saheba

Quarter-final

21 February 2018	Karnataka; 347/8 (50 overs)	v	Hyderabad; 244 (42.5 overs)	Karnataka won by 103 runs
09:00 IST; Scorecard	Karnataka; 347/8 (50 overs)	v	Hyderabad; 244 (42.5 overs)	Feroz Shah Kotla, Delhi; Umpires: Anil Chaudhary and Virender Sharma
09:00 IST; Scorecard	Mayank Agarwal 140 (111); Mohammad Siraj 5/59 (10 overs)		Ambati Rayudu 64 (62); Shreyas Gopal 5/31 (6.5 overs)	Feroz Shah Kotla, Delhi; Umpires: Anil Chaudhary and Virender Sharma
Karnataka won the toss and elected to bat; Tanay Thyagarajan (Hyderabad) made his List-A debut.				Feroz Shah Kotla, Delhi; Umpires: Anil Chaudhary and Virender Sharma

==== Statistics ====
Most runs

Player	Mat	Inns	Runs	Ave	SR	HS	100	50
Rohit Rayudu	7	7	357	51.00	80.95	130	2	0
Akshath Reddy	7	7	341	48.71	95.51	127	1	2
Bavanaka Sandeep	7	7	312	44.57	93.41	79	0	3

- Source: ESPNcricinfo

Most wickets

Player	Mat	Inns	Wkts	Ave	Econ	BBI	SR	4WI	5WI
Mohammed Siraj	7	7	23	15.65	5.68	5/37	16.5	0	3
Akash Bhandari	7	7	8	30.12	6.17	3/34	29.2	0	0
Ravi Kiran	7	7	8	39.75	5.49	2/17	43.3	0	0

- Source: ESPNcricinfo

== Senior Women's team ==
=== Squads ===
- Head coach: Savita Nirala
- Physio : Harsha Ganwal
- Trainer : V Keerthi
- Video analyst : Sudha Kumarasena

One-Day League	T20 League
Gouher Sultana (c); Ananya Upendran; Sravanthi Naidu; Pranathi Reddy; Rachna S Kumar; Bhogi Shravani; Sunitha Anand (wk); Nishath Fatima (wk); Vellore Mahesh Kavya; Mamata Kanojia; D Ramya; Sneha Morey; K Anitha; Himani Yadav; Archana Das	Sravanthi Naidu (c); D Ramya; Himani Yadav; Pranathi Reddy; Rachna S Kumar; Sneha Morey; Sravya (wk); Ananya Upendran; Vellore Mahesh Kavya; Gouher Sultana; G Trisha; Mamata Kanojia; V Pooja; K Anitha; Nishath Fatima (wk)

Senior women's cricket inter zonal three day game

Himani Yadav, Ananya Upendran, Vellore Mahesh Kavya, Gouher Sultana and Sravanthi Naidu got selected for South Zone squad for 2017-18 Senior women's cricket inter zonal three day game, a Women's First-class cricket tournament in India.

=== One-Day League ===
Hyderabad began their campaign in Senior women's one day league, Women's List A cricket tournament in India, against Andhra at Hyderabad on 6 December 2017. They finished in third in Elite Group A with a win and three losses.

==== Points Table ====
Elite Group A

Team	Pld	W	L	T	NR	Pts	NRR
Railways	4	4	0	0	0	16	+0.647
Andhra	4	3	1	0	0	12	+0.454
Hyderabad	4	1	3	0	0	4	-0.175
Himachal Pradesh	4	1	3	0	0	4	-0.372
Madhya Pradesh	4	1	3	0	0	4	-0.460

Top two teams advanced to Super League.
Bottom team relegated to 2018–19 Plate Group.

==== Matches ====
Group Stage

6 December 2017	Andhra; 176/9 (50 overs)	v	Hyderabad; 125 (38.2 overs)	Andhra won by 51 runs
Scorecard	Andhra; 176/9 (50 overs)	v	Hyderabad; 125 (38.2 overs)	AOC Ground, Hyderabad; Umpires: Bhatt Milind and Sahasrabudhe Anish
Scorecard	N Anusha 41 (94); Vellore Mahesh Kavya 4/32 (10 overs)		Mamata Kanojia 34 (36); E Padmaja 4/25 (8 overs)	AOC Ground, Hyderabad; Umpires: Bhatt Milind and Sahasrabudhe Anish
Andhra won the toss and elected to bat.				AOC Ground, Hyderabad; Umpires: Bhatt Milind and Sahasrabudhe Anish

8 December 2017	Railways; 226/3 (50 overs)	v	Hyderabad; 220/8 (50 overs)	Railways won by 6 runs
Scorecard	Railways; 226/3 (50 overs)	v	Hyderabad; 220/8 (50 overs)	AOC Ground, Hyderabad; Umpires: Chavan Sandeep and Sahasrabudhe Anish
Scorecard	Sarika Koli 71 (111); Bhogi Shravani 1/23 (5 overs)		Himani Yadav 54 (68); Rajeshwari 4/52 (10 overs)	AOC Ground, Hyderabad; Umpires: Chavan Sandeep and Sahasrabudhe Anish
Railways won the toss and elected to bat.				AOC Ground, Hyderabad; Umpires: Chavan Sandeep and Sahasrabudhe Anish

10 December 2017	Hyderabad; 191/8 (50 overs)	v	Madhya Pradesh; 166 (49.1 overs)	Hyderabad won by 25 runs
Scorecard	Hyderabad; 191/8 (50 overs)	v	Madhya Pradesh; 166 (49.1 overs)	AOC Ground, Hyderabad; Umpires: Bhatt Milind and Chavan Sandeep
Scorecard	Sravanthi Naidu 39 (70); Aparna Shrivatsava 3/29 (6 overs)		Priti Yadav 46 (41); Vellore Mahesh Kavya 3/35 (10 overs)	AOC Ground, Hyderabad; Umpires: Bhatt Milind and Chavan Sandeep
Hyderabad won the toss and elected to bat.				AOC Ground, Hyderabad; Umpires: Bhatt Milind and Chavan Sandeep

12 December 2017	Hyderabad; 202 (48.3 overs)	v	Himachal Pradesh; 203/4 (49.3 overs)	Himachal Pradesh won by 6 wickets
Scorecard	Hyderabad; 202 (48.3 overs)	v	Himachal Pradesh; 203/4 (49.3 overs)	AOC Ground, Hyderabad; Umpires: Bhatt Milind and Chavan Sandeep
Scorecard	Sneha Morey 35 (41); N S Chauhan 2/22 (10 overs)		H B Deol 79 (107); Gouher Sultana 3/34 (10 overs)	AOC Ground, Hyderabad; Umpires: Bhatt Milind and Chavan Sandeep
Hyderabad won the toss and elected to bat.				AOC Ground, Hyderabad; Umpires: Bhatt Milind and Chavan Sandeep

==== Statistics ====
Most runs

Player	Mat	Inns	Runs	Ave	SR	HS	100	50
Sravanthi Naidu	4	4	127	31.75	50.39	39	0	0
Sneha Morey	4	4	122	30.50	62.56	38	0	0
Himani Yadav	4	4	84	21.00	55.62	54	0	1

- Source: BCCI

Most wickets

Player	Mat	Inns	Wkts	Ave	Econ	BBI	SR	4WI	5WI
Vellore Mahesh Kavya	4	4	8	19.25	4.00	4/32	28.87	1	0
Gouher Sultana	4	4	5	28.80	3.69	3/34	46.80	0	0

- Source: BCCI

=== T20 League ===
Hyderabad began their campaign in Senior Women's T20 League, a Women's Twenty20 cricket tournament in India, against Railways at Mumbai on 13 January 2018. They finished in last in Elite Group B with no wins and four losses and got relegated to Plate Group for 2018–19 season.

==== Points Table ====
Elite Group B

Team	Pld	W	L	T	NR	Pts	NRR
Maharashtra	4	4	0	0	0	16	+1.011
Delhi	4	3	1	0	0	12	-0.223
Railways	4	2	2	0	0	8	+0.905
Mumbai	4	1	3	0	0	4	-0.786
Hyderabad	4	0	4	0	0	0	-0.780

Top two teams advanced to Super League.
Bottom team relegated to 2018–19 Plate Group.

==== Matches ====
Group Stage

13 January 2018	Hyderabad; 107/9 (20 overs)	v	Railways; 109/2 (17.4 overs)	Railways won by 8 wickets
Scorecard	Hyderabad; 107/9 (20 overs)	v	Railways; 109/2 (17.4 overs)	Sharad Pawar Cricket Academy BKC, Mumbai; Umpires: Vikas Bhatt and Sud Abhiroope
Scorecard	D Ramya 57 (51); Mona Meshram 3/28 (4 overs)		Mithali Raj 55* (47); Gouher Sultana 1/12 (3 overs)	Sharad Pawar Cricket Academy BKC, Mumbai; Umpires: Vikas Bhatt and Sud Abhiroope
Railways won the toss and elected to field.				Sharad Pawar Cricket Academy BKC, Mumbai; Umpires: Vikas Bhatt and Sud Abhiroope

14 January 2018	Maharashtra; 97 (19.1 overs)	v	Hyderabad; 85 (20 overs)	Maharashtra won by 12 runs
Scorecard	Maharashtra; 97 (19.1 overs)	v	Hyderabad; 85 (20 overs)	Sachin Tendulkar Gymkhana, Mumbai; Umpires: Vikas Bhatt and Sud Abhiroope
Scorecard	D P Vadiya 27 (27); G Trisha 3/10 (4 overs)		Ananya Upendran 35 (30); D P Vadiya 3/14 (4 overs)	Sachin Tendulkar Gymkhana, Mumbai; Umpires: Vikas Bhatt and Sud Abhiroope
Maharashtra won the toss and elected to bat.				Sachin Tendulkar Gymkhana, Mumbai; Umpires: Vikas Bhatt and Sud Abhiroope

16 January 2018	Hyderabad; 67 (20 overs)	v	Mumbai; 69/2 (15.5 overs)	Mumbai won by 8 wickets
Scorecard	Hyderabad; 67 (20 overs)	v	Mumbai; 69/2 (15.5 overs)	Sachin Tendulkar Gymkhana, Mumbai; Umpires: Vikas Bhatt and Sud Abhiroope
Scorecard	Himani Yadav 16 (34); Sheral Rozario 4/10 (3 overs)		Mugdha Joshi 26* (29); Gouher Sultana 1/17 (3.5 overs)	Sachin Tendulkar Gymkhana, Mumbai; Umpires: Vikas Bhatt and Sud Abhiroope
Mumbai won the toss and elected to field.				Sachin Tendulkar Gymkhana, Mumbai; Umpires: Vikas Bhatt and Sud Abhiroope

17 January 2018	Hyderabad; 98/6 (20 overs)	v	Delhi; 99/4 (17.5 overs)	Delhi won by 6 wickets
Scorecard	Hyderabad; 98/6 (20 overs)	v	Delhi; 99/4 (17.5 overs)	Sharad Pawar Cricket Academy BKC, Mumbai; Umpires: Vikas Bhatt and K Raghuram
Scorecard	Himani Yadav 33 (39); Ayush Soni 4/15 (4 overs)		Neha Tanwar 51* (47); Himani Yadav 1/5 (2 overs)	Sharad Pawar Cricket Academy BKC, Mumbai; Umpires: Vikas Bhatt and K Raghuram
Hyderabad won the toss and elected to bat.				Sharad Pawar Cricket Academy BKC, Mumbai; Umpires: Vikas Bhatt and K Raghuram

==== Statistics ====
Most runs

Player	Mat	Inns	Runs	Ave	SR	HS	100	50
D Ramya	4	4	87	21.75	78.37	57	0	1
Himani Yadav	4	4	73	18.25	73.73	33	0	0
Ananya Upendran	4	4	55	13.75	110.00	35	0	0

- Source: BCCI

Most wickets

Player	Mat	Inns	Wkts	Ave	Econ	BBI	SR	4WI	5WI
Gouher Sultana	4	4	4	15.25	4.69	2/13	19.50	0	0
Himani Yadav	4	4	3	15.33	5.75	2/15	16.00	0	0
G Trisha	4	4	3	22.33	5.22	3/10	25.66	0	0

- Source: BCCI

== Telangana T20 League ==
Hyderabad Cricket Association launched the Telangana T20 League with an initiative to provide major boost to rural cricketers who lag behind due to lack of proper infrastructure and coaching facilities. Many Hyderabad players took part in the inaugural season and Adilabad Tigers won the tournament with Danny Dereck Prince scoring most runs of the tournament and Siddantham Praneeth Raj taking most wickets.

== See also ==
Hyderabad cricket team
Hyderabad women's cricket team
Hyderabad Cricket Association
