= 2015–16 Syed Mushtaq Ali Trophy Group A =

Cricket tournament

- Dates: 2 January 2016 – 10 January 2016
- Administrator(s): BCCI
- Cricket format: Twenty20 cricket
- Tournament format(s): Round robin
- Host(s): Vidarbha
- Participants: 7
- Matches: 21

2015–16 Syed Mushtaq Ali Trophy is the seventh season of the Syed Mushtaq Ali Trophy, a Twenty20 cricket tournament in India. It is contested by 27 domestic cricket teams of India. Group A consisted of Gujarat, Himachal Pradesh, Hyderabad, Bengal, Tamil Nadu, Haryana and Vidarbha.

== Round 1 ==
2 January 2016
Scorecard

| Bengal; 185/4 (20 overs) | v | Hyderabad; 124 (16.2 overs) |

Bengal won by 61 runs
Vidarbha Cricket Association Ground, Nagpur

- Pramod Chandila (Bengal); Jaweed Ali, Mohammed Siraj and Kolla Sumanth (Hyderabad) all made their T20 debuts.

2 January 2016
Scorecard

| Gujarat; 151/6 (20 overs) | v | Himachal Pradesh; 152/5 (19.3 overs) |

Himachal Pradesh won by 5 wickets
Vidarbha Cricket Association Ground, Nagpur

2 January 2016
Scorecard

| Haryana; 113 (19.1 overs) | v | Tamil Nadu; 116/1 (16 overs) |

Tamil Nadu won by 9 wickets
Vidarbha Cricket Association Ground, Nagpur

- Rahul Dagar, Mohit Hooda, Rohit Sharma (Haryana); Murugan Ashwin and Jagatheesan Kousik (Tamil Nadu) all made their T20 debuts.

== Round 2 ==
3 January 2016
Scorecard

| Tamil Nadu; 151/8 (20 overs) | v | Bengal; 82 (15.5 overs) |

Tamil Nadu won by 69 runs
Vidarbha Cricket Association Ground, Nagpur

3 January 2016
Scorecard

| Gujarat; 174/7 (20 overs) | v | Vidarbha; 114 (18.4 overs) |

Gujarat won by 60 runs
Vidarbha Cricket Association Ground, Nagpur

- Rajneesh Gurbani and Akshay Karnewar (Vidarbha) both made their T20 debuts.

3 January 2016
Scorecard

| Hyderabad; 140/9 (20 overs) | v | Himachal Pradesh; 126/9 (20 overs) |

Hyderabad won by 14 runs
Vidarbha Cricket Association Ground, Nagpur

== Round 3 ==
4 January 2016
Scorecard

| Hyderabad; 131/7 (20 overs) | v | Gujarat; 134/7 (19.3 overs) |

Gujarat won by 3 wickets
Vidarbha Cricket Association Ground, Nagpur

- Vishal Sharma (Hyderabad) made his T20 debut.

4 January 2016
Scorecard

| Haryana; 136/8 (20 overs) | v | Vidarbha; 140/2 (19.3 overs) |

Vidarbha won by 8 wickets
Vidarbha Cricket Association Ground, Nagpur

4 January 2016
Scorecard

| Bengal; 154/6 (20 overs) | v | Himachal Pradesh; 152/3 (20 overs) |

Bengal won by 2 runs
Vidarbha Cricket Association Ground, Nagpur

- Anurag Tiwari (Bengal) made his T20 debut.

== Round 4 ==
6 January 2016
Scorecard

| Bengal; 101 (19.1 overs) | v | Gujarat; 104/2 (11.5 overs) |

Gujarat won by 8 wickets
Vidarbha Cricket Association Ground, Nagpur

- Mukesh Kumar (Bengal) and Raxlee Taylor (Gujarat) both made their T20 debuts.

6 January 2016
Scorecard

| Hyderabad; 173/8 (20 overs) | v | Haryana; 138/7 (20 overs) |

Hyderabad won by 35 runs
Vidarbha Cricket Association Ground, Nagpur

- Chaitanya Bishnoi (Haryana) and Annabathula Akash (Hyderabad) both made their T20 debuts.

6 January 2016
Scorecard

| Tamil Nadu; 150/8 (20 overs) | v | Vidarbha; 154/3 (18.3 overs) |

Vidarbha won by 7 wickets
Vidarbha Cricket Association Ground, Nagpur

== Round 5 ==
7 January 2016
Scorecard

| Bengal; 147/5 (20 overs) | v | Vidarbha; 151/6 (19.2 overs) |

Vidarbha won by 4 wickets
Vidarbha Cricket Association Ground, Nagpur

7 January 2016
Scorecard

| Gujarat; 105 (19.4 overs) | v | Tamil Nadu; 111/1 (12.5 overs) |

Tamil Nadu won by 9 wickets
Vidarbha Cricket Association Ground, Nagpur

7 January 2016
Scorecard

| Haryana; 122/9 (20 overs) | v | Himachal Pradesh; 123/8 (19.2 overs) |

Himachal Pradesh won by 2 wickets
Vidarbha Cricket Association Ground, Nagpur

- Poonish Mehta (Haryana) made his T20 debut.

== Round 6 ==
9 January 2016
Scorecard

| Tamil Nadu; 168/6 (20 overs) | v | Himachal Pradesh; 173/4 (16.5 overs) |

Himachal Pradesh won by 6 wickets
Vidarbha Cricket Association Ground, Nagpur

- Bharath Shankar (Tamil Nadu) made his T20 debut.

9 January 2016
Scorecard

| Hyderabad; 139/7 (20 overs) | v | Vidarbha; 142/5 (20 overs) |

Vidarbha won by 5 wickets
Vidarbha Cricket Association Ground, Nagpur

9 January 2016
Scorecard

| Haryana; 127/3 (20 overs) | v | Bengal; 110/8 (20 overs) |

Haryana won by 17 runs
Vidarbha Cricket Association Ground, Nagpur

== Round 7 ==
10 January 2016
Scorecard

| Haryana; 95 (20 overs) | v | Gujarat; 99/1 (6.4 overs) |

Gujarat won by 9 wickets
Vidarbha Cricket Association Ground, Nagpur

- Kuldeep Ghadvi (Gujarat) and Shamsher Yadav (Haryana) both made their T20 debuts.

10 January 2016
Scorecard

| Hyderabad; 140/8 (20 overs) | v | Tamil Nadu; 141/6 (18.4 overs) |

Tamil Nadu won by 4 wickets
Vidarbha Cricket Association Ground, Nagpur

- Himalay Agarwal, Mehdi Hassan (Hyderabad) and Abhishek Tanwar (Tamil Nadu) all made their T20 debuts.

10 January 2016
Scorecard

| Vidarbha; 183/6 (20 overs) | v | Himachal Pradesh; 156 (19.5 overs) |

Vidarbha won by 27 runs
Vidarbha Cricket Association Ground, Nagpur
