= Bharath Shankar =

Indian cricketer (born 1994)

Personal information
- Born: 20 May 1994 (age 32); Chennai, Tamil Nadu, India
- Batting: Right-handed
- Bowling: Right-arm off-spin
- Source: ESPNcricinfo, 10 October 2015

Bharath Shankar (born 20 May 1994) is an Indian cricketer who plays for Tamil Nadu. He made his first-class debut on 21 December 2014 in the 2014–15 Ranji Trophy. He made his Twenty20 debut on 9 January 2016 in the 2015–16 Syed Mushtaq Ali Trophy. In June 2016, he was named as the Collegiate Cricketer of the Year at the 86th Tamil Nadu Cricket Association awards.
