= Kuldeep Ghadvi =

Indian cricketer (born 1986)

Personal information
- Born: 15 September 1986 (age 40); Mehsana, India
- Source: ESPNcricinfo, 20 November 2016

Kuldeep Ghadvi (born 15 September 1986) is an Indian cricketer. He made his Twenty20 debut for Gujarat in the 2015–16 Syed Mushtaq Ali Trophy on 10 January 2016.
