= Sufiyan Alam =

Indian cricketer (born 1995)

Personal information
- Born: 2 April 1995 (age 31); New Delhi, India
- Batting: Right-handed
- Bowling: Right arm offbreak

Domestic team information
- Years: Team
- 2015–16: Services
- Source: Cricinfo, 11 October 2015

Sufiyan Alam (born 2 April 1995) is an Indian cricketer who plays for Services. He made his first-class debut on 1 October 2015 in the 2015–16 Ranji Trophy. He made his List A debut in the 2015–16 Vijay Hazare Trophy on 10 December 2015. He made his Twenty20 debut on 8 November 2021, for Services in the 2021–22 Syed Mushtaq Ali Trophy.
