= Wasiqur Rahman =

Indian cricketer (born 1994)

Personal information
- Born: 29 December 1994 (age 31); Sivasagar, Assam, India
- Batting: Right-handed
- Role: Wicket-keeper-batter

Domestic team information
- Years: Team
- 2015–present: Assam
- FC debut: 1 December 2015 Assam v Bengal
- Source: Cricinfo, 2 December 2015

Wasiqur Rahman (born 29 December 1994) is an Indian cricketer. He is a right-handed wicket-keeper batter. He made his debut in first-class on 1 December 2015 in Ranji Trophy for Assam against Bengal. He made his Twenty20 debut on 9 January 2016 in the 2015–16 Syed Mushtaq Ali Trophy.
