= Amit Pachhara =

Indian cricketer (born 1995)

Personal information
- Full name: Amit Rakesh Pachhara
- Born: 8 September 1995 (age 31); Mathura, Uttar Pradesh, India
- Batting: Right-handed
- Bowling: Right arm off-break
- Source: ESPNcricinfo, 13 December 2015

Amit Pachhara (born 8 September 1995) is an Indian cricketer who plays for Services. He made his first-class debut on 15 November 2015 in the 2015–16 Ranji Trophy. He made his List A debut on 17 December 2015 in the 2015–16 Vijay Hazare Trophy. He made his Twenty20 debut for Services in the 2016–17 Inter State Twenty-20 Tournament on 29 January 2017.
