= Manender Singh =

Indian cricketer (born 1996)

Personal information
- Full name: Manender Narender Singh
- Born: 2 January 1996 (age 30); Jaipur, Rajasthan, India
- Batting: Right-handed
- Role: Wicketkeeper
- Source: ESPNcricinfo, 12 December 2015

Manender Singh (born 2 January 1996) is an Indian cricketer who plays for Rajasthan. He made his first-class debut on 23 November 2015 in the 2015–16 Ranji Trophy. He made his Twenty20 debut on 2 January 2016 in the 2015–16 Syed Mushtaq Ali Trophy.

He was the leading run-scorer for Rajasthan in the 2018–19 Vijay Hazare Trophy, with 282 runs in five matches.
