= Annabathula Akash =

Indian cricketer (born 1991)

Personal information
- Full name: Annabathula Durgaprasad Akash
- Born: 23 October 1991 (age 35); Hyderabad, India
- Batting: Right-handed

Domestic team information
- Years: Team
- 2015–present: Hyderabad

Career statistics
Competition	Twenty20
Matches	3
Runs scored	29
Batting average	9.66
100s/50s	0/0
Top score	25
Catches/stumpings	1/0
- Source: ESPNcricinfo, 25 June 2018

Annabathula Akash (born 23 October 1991) is an Indian cricketer who plays for Hyderabad. He made his Twenty20 debut on 6 January 2016 in the 2015–16 Syed Mushtaq Ali Trophy.
