= Bhausaheb Bandodkar Ground =

Cricket ground in Panaji, Goa, India

Coordinates: 15°29′31.46″N 73°48′56.67″E

- Interactive map of Bhausaheb Bandodkar Ground

Ground information
- Location: Panaji, India
- Country: India
- Establishment: 1963
- Capacity: 10,000
- End names
- Mandovi River End; D.B. Bandodkar Road End

Team information
Goa	(1986–2006)
- As of 29 October 2011; Source: Ground profile

Bhausaheb Bandodkar Ground (also known as Campal Grounds and Panjim Gymkhana Grounds) is a cricket ground in Panaji, Goa, India. The first recorded match held on the ground came in 1966 when Gujarat Governor's XI played Maharashtra Governor's XI. The first first-class to be played there came in the 1986/87 Ranji Trophy when Goa played Tamil Nadu. Between the 1986/87 season and the 2005/06 season, the ground held 26 first-class matches. The first List A match played there came when Goa played Kerala in the 1993/94 Ranji Trophy one-day competition. Fifteen further List A matches have been played on the ground, the last of which saw Andhra Pradesh play Hyderabad in the 2004/05 Ranji Trophy one-day competition.
