= Sidhant Dobal =

Indian cricketer (born 1993)

Personal information
- Born: 9 October 1993 (age 33); Delhi, India
- Batting: Right handed
- Bowling: Right arm offbreak

Domestic team information
- Years: Team
- 2015–16: Rajasthan
- Source: Cricinfo, 12 December 2015

Sidhant Dobal (born 9 October 1993) is an Indian cricketer who plays for Rajasthan. He made his first-class debut on 15 November 2015 in the 2015–16 Ranji Trophy. He made his Twenty20 debut on 9 January 2016 in the 2015–16 Syed Mushtaq Ali Trophy.
