= Yathin Reddy =

Indian cricketer (born 1993)

Personal information
- Born: 26 November 1993 (age 32); Hyderabad, India
- Batting: Right-handed
- Bowling: Right arm offbreak

Domestic team information
- Years: Team
- 2015-present: Hyderabad

Career statistics
| Competition | LA |
|---|---|
| Matches | 2 |
| Runs scored | 1 |
| Batting average | 0.50 |
| 100s/50s | 0/0 |
| Top score | 1 |
| Catches/stumpings | 1/0 |
- Source: Cricinfo, 25 June 2018

Yathin Reddy (born 26 November 1993) is an Indian cricketer who plays for Hyderabad. He made his List A debut on 13 December 2015 in the 2015–16 Vijay Hazare Trophy.
