= Velidi Lakshman =

Indian cricketer (born 1991)

Personal information
- Born: 6 July 1991 (age 35); Chennai, Tamil Nadu, India
- Batting: Right-handed
- Bowling: Right-arm medium-fast
- Source: Cricinfo, 9 November 2017

Velidi Lakshman (born 6 July 1991) is an Indian cricketer. He made his first-class debut for Tamil Nadu in the 2017–18 Ranji Trophy on 9 November 2017.
