= Vishal Sharma (Hyderabad cricketer) =

Indian cricketer (born 1987)

Personal information
- Born: 14 November 1987 (age 38); Hyderabad, India

Domestic team information
- Years: Team
- 2007–2016: Hyderabad

Career statistics
Competition	FC	LA	T20
Matches	12	7	1
Runs scored	155	4	0
Batting average	11.07	1.33	-
100s/50s	0/0	0/0	0/0
Top score	37	1*	0*
Balls bowled	2,467	372	18
Wickets	31	7	0
Bowling average	40.00	37.42	–
5 wickets in innings	0	0	–
10 wickets in match	0	0	–
Best bowling	4/30	2/40	–
Catches/stumpings	7/0	3/0	0/0
- Source: Cricinfo, 25 June 2018

Vishal Sharma (born 14 November 1987) is an Indian first-class cricketer who plays for Hyderabad. He made his Twenty20 debut on 4 January 2016 in the 2015–16 Syed Mushtaq Ali Trophy.
