= Sagar Trivedi =

Indian cricketer (born 1991)

Personal information
- Born: 20 October 1991 (age 33); Mumbai, India

Domestic team information
- Years: Team
- 2015–18: Mumbai
- 2018–present: Puducherry
- Source: Cricinfo, 22 December 2015

Sagar Trivedi (born 20 October 1991) is an Indian cricketer who plays for Puducherry. He made his List A debut on 10 December 2015 in the 2015–16 Vijay Hazare Trophy and his first-class debut on 17 December 2019 for Puducherry in the 2019–20 Ranji Trophy.
