= Puneet Kumar =

Indian cricketer (born 1998)

Personal information
- Born: 22 June 1998 (age 28); Jammu, India
- Source: Cricinfo, 12 February 2018

Puneet Kumar (born 22 June 1998) is an Indian cricketer. He made his List A debut for Jammu & Kashmir in the 2017–18 Vijay Hazare Trophy on 12 February 2018. He made his Twenty20 debut on 12 January 2021, for Jammu and Kashmir in the 2020–21 Syed Mushtaq Ali Trophy.
