= Pramod Chandila =

Indian cricketer (born 1993)

Personal information
- Born: 18 July 1993 (age 31); Faridabad, Haryana, India
- Source: Cricinfo, 2 November 2015

Pramod Chandila (born 18 July 1993) is an Indian cricketer who plays for Haryana. He made his first-class debut on 30 October in the 2015–16 Ranji Trophy. He made his Twenty20 debut on 2 January 2016 in the 2015–16 Syed Mushtaq Ali Trophy. He made his List A debut for Bengal in the 2016–17 Vijay Hazare Trophy on 1 March 2017.

He was the leading run-scorer for Haryana in the 2018–19 Vijay Hazare Trophy, with 317 runs in nine matches.
