= Jogeswar Bhumij =

Indian cricketer (born 1992)

Personal information
- Full name: Jogeswar Chaliya Bhumij
- Born: 1 July 1992 (age 34); Pabhoi, Sonitpur, Assam, India
- Source: ESPNcricinfo, 20 November 2016

Jogeswar Bhumij (born 1 July 1992) is an Indian cricketer. He made his Twenty20 debut for Assam in the 2015–16 Syed Mushtaq Ali Trophy on 10 January 2016.
