= Amit Mishra (cricketer, born 1991) =

Indian cricketer (born 1991)

Personal information
- Born: 11 November 1991 (age 35); Kanpur, Uttar Pradesh, India
- Batting: Right-handed
- Bowling: Right-arm Medium-Fast
- Role: Bowler

Domestic team information
- Years: Team
- 2012/13–2018/19: Uttar Pradesh

Career statistics
| Competition | FC | LA | T20 |
|---|---|---|---|
| Matches | 12 | 6 | 7 |
| Runs scored | 225 | 14 | 4 |
| Batting average | 16.07 | – | 2.00 |
| 100s/50s | 0/1 | 0/0 | 0/0 |
| Top score | 59 | 9* | 4* |
| Balls bowled | 2,053 | 288 | 144 |
| Wickets | 45 | 13 | 8 |
| Bowling average | 21.77 | 19.92 | 20.75 |
| 5 wickets in innings | 3 | 0 | 0 |
| 10 wickets in match | 0 | 0 | 0 |
| Best bowling | 7/59 | 4/38 | 3/23 |
| Catches/stumpings | 8/– | 1/– | 2/– |
- Source: ESPNcricinfo, 28 March 2015

Amit Mishra (born 11 November 1991) is an Indian former cricketer who played for Uttar Pradesh cricket team in domestic cricket. He was a right-arm medium-fast bowler who was a member of the Rajasthan Royals squad for 2014 Indian Premier League.
