= Mumtaz Qadir =

Indian cricketer (born 1986)

Personal information
- Born: 17 November 1986 (age 39); Allahabad, India
- Batting: Right-handed

Domestic team information
- Years: Team
- Services

Career statistics
Competition	First-class
Matches	3
Runs scored	50
Batting average	12.50
100s/50s	0/0
Top score	37
Catches/stumpings	2/0
- Source: ESPNcricinfo, 29 January 2017

Mumtaz Qadir (born 17 November 1986) is an Indian cricketer. He made his first-class debut for Services in the 2007–08 Ranji Trophy on 3 November 2007.
