= Jaweed Ali =

Indian cricketer (born 1993)

Personal information
- Full name: Mir Jaweed Ali
- Born: 15 December 1993 (age 32); Hyderabad, India
- Batting: Right handed
- Bowling: Right-arm offbreak
- Role: Batsman

Domestic team information
- Years: Team
- 2015–present: Hyderabad

Career statistics
Competition	FC	LA	T20
Matches	4	4	3
Runs scored	210	55	50
Batting average	26.25	55.00	16.66
100s/50s	0/2	0/0	0/0
Top score	98	44*	35
Catches/stumpings	3/–	3/–	2/–
- Source: ESPNcricinfo, 6 May 2020

Jaweed Ali (born 15 December 1993) is an Indian cricketer who plays for Hyderabad. He made his List A debut on 14 December 2015 in the 2015–16 Vijay Hazare Trophy. He made his Twenty20 debut on 2 January 2016 in the 2015–16 Syed Mushtaq Ali Trophy. He made his first-class debut on 3 January 2020, for Hyderabad in the 2019–20 Ranji Trophy.
