= Himalay Agarwal =

Indian cricketer (born 1993)

Personal information
- Born: 9 October 1993 (age 33); Hyderabad, India
- Batting: Right-handed
- Bowling: Right-arm medium fast

Domestic team information
- Years: Team
- 2015-present: Hyderabad

Career statistics
Competition	FC	LA	T20
Matches	18	8	8
Runs scored	791	41	86
Batting average	32.95	5.85	12.28
100s/50s	0/7	0/0	0/0
Top score	79	14	34
Balls bowled	36	–	–
Wickets	2	–	–
Bowling average	19.00	–	–
5 wickets in innings	0	–	–
10 wickets in match	0	–	–
Best bowling	2/21	–	–
Catches/stumpings	5/–	4/–	1/–
- Source: ESPNcricinfo, 6 May 2020

Himalay Agarwal (born 9 October 1993) is an Indian cricketer who plays for Hyderabad. He made his Twenty20 debut on 10 January 2016 in the 2015–16 Syed Mushtaq Ali Trophy.
