= Ashish Reddy =

Indian cricketer (born 1991)

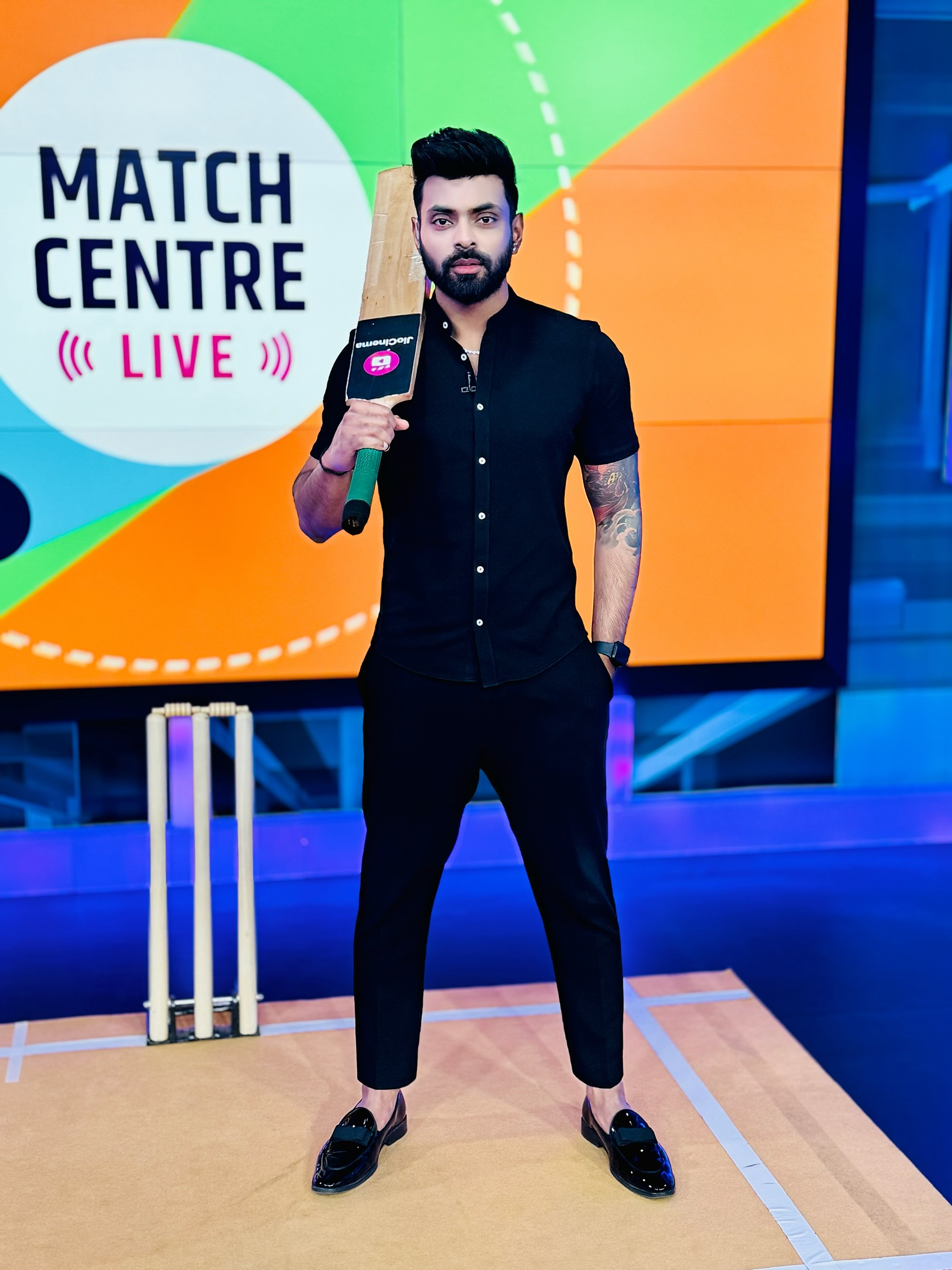

Personal information
- Full name: Ammana Ashish Reddy
- Born: 24 February 1991 (age 35); Secunderabad, Telangana, India
- Batting: Right-handed
- Bowling: Right-arm medium
- Role: All-rounder

Domestic team information
- Years: Team
- 2012: Deccan Chargers (squad no. 14)
- 2013–2016: Sunrisers Hyderabad (squad no. 02)
- 2009–present: Hyderabad

Career statistics
Competition	FC	LA	T20
Matches	22	38	77
Runs scored	987	745	637
Batting average	37.96	29.80	13.55
100s/50s	1/9	1/4	0/0
Top score	104	119*	37
Balls bowled	2,916	1,424	940
Wickets	53	46	57
Bowling average	27.00	30.06	22.01
5 wickets in innings	3	2	0
10 wickets in match	0	0	0
Best bowling	6/56	5/30	4/22
Catches/stumpings	5/–	6/–	22/–
- Source: ESPNcricinfo, 3 July 2019

Ammana Ashish Reddy (born 24 February 1991) is an Indian cricketer. Reddy is a right-handed batsman who bowls right-arm medium pace. He was born in Secunderabad, Telangana. Reddy has played First class, List A and Twenty20 cricket for Hyderabad. Ashish Reddy made his IPL debut in 2012 with Deccan Chargers and his contract was renewed with Sunrisers Hyderabad for the 2013 season. He along with Ravi Kiran holds the record for the highest 10th wicket partnership in List A history(128)

== Indian Premier League ==
Additionally, he has played for the Deccan Chargers in the 2012 Indian Premier League.

=== 2013 ===
In this season, Ashish Reddy has been picked by Sunrisers Hyderabad (which replaced Deccan Chargers) and played a few games and he was sidelined as he picked up an injury that put him out of action for rest of the IPL.

=== 2014 ===
Ashish Reddy was selected to play for Sunrisers Hyderabad

=== 2015 ===
In the 2015 Indian Premier League, Ashish Reddy was retained by the Sunrisers Hyderabad and took Darren Sammy's wicket in the match against RCB. He was also part of the thrilling match against Delhi Daredevils in which he had hit Angelo Mathews for a six scoring 15 runs from 8 balls, where his team finally lost by a mere 4 runs. Ashish hit crucial 22 runs in 8 balls against Kings XI Punjab in which SRH won the match.
