= Tanveer Ul-Haq =

Indian cricketer (born 1991)

Personal information
- Full name: Tanveer Mashart Ul-Haq
- Born: 3 December 1991 (age 34); Dholpur, Rajasthan, India
- Batting: Right-handed
- Bowling: Left-arm medium-fast

Domestic team information
- Years: Team
- 2012/13–2023/24: Rajasthan
- Source: Cricinfo, 9 October 2017

Tanveer Mashart Ul-Haq (born 3 December 1991) is an Indian cricketer. He made his first-class debut for Rajasthan in the 2014–15 Ranji Trophy on 5 January 2015. In January 2019, in the quarter-final match of the 2018–19 Ranji Trophy against Karnataka, Tanveer became the first bowler for Rajasthan to take 50 wickets in a single season. He finished the tournament with 51 wickets in ten matches.

In August 2019, he was named in the India Green team's squad for the 2019–20 Duleep Trophy.
