= Balchander Anirudh =

Indian cricketer (born 1994)

Personal information
- Born: 2 September 1994 (age 32); Chennai, India

Domestic team information
- Years: Team
- 2013–2017: Hyderabad
- 2018-: Tamil Nadu

Career statistics
Competition	FC	LA	T20
Matches	20	10	5
Runs scored	1,122	178	70
Batting average	44.88	19.77	17.50
100s/50s	1/9	0/0	0/0
Top score	120*	39	27
Catches/stumpings	8/0	4/0	2/0
- Source: ESPNcricinfo, 25 June 2018

Balchander Anirudh (born 2 September 1994) is an Indian first-class cricketer who plays for Hyderabad. He made his Twenty20 debut for Hyderabad in the 2016–17 Inter State Twenty-20 Tournament on 29 January 2017.
