= Ravi Kiran =

Indian cricketer (born 1991)

Personal information
- Full name: Majeti Ravi Kiran
- Born: 1 February 1991 (age 35); Hyderabad, Telangana, India
- Batting: Right handed
- Bowling: Right arm medium
- Role: Bowler

Domestic team information
- Years: Team
- 2012-present: Hyderabad

Career statistics
| Competition | FC | LA | T20 |
|---|---|---|---|
| Matches | 46 | 39 | 31 |
| Runs scored | 168 | 88 | 14 |
| Batting average | 5.09 | 7.33 | 7.00 |
| 100s/50s | 0/0 | 0/0 | 0/0 |
| Top score | 19 | 27 | 4* |
| Balls bowled | 8,319 | 1,908 | 684 |
| Wickets | 149 | 57 | 34 |
| Bowling average | 25.83 | 28.57 | 24.32 |
| 5 wickets in innings | 1 | 1 | 0 |
| 10 wickets in match | 0 | 0 | 0 |
| Best bowling | 5/53 | 5/53 | 4/23 |
| Catches/stumpings | 13/– | 5/– | 2/– |
- Source: Cricinfo, 7 May 2020

Ravi Kiran (born 1 February 1991) is an Indian cricketer who plays for Hyderabad.

He along with Ashish Reddy, he holds the record 10th-wicket partnership in List A cricket, with 128 runs. He was the leading wicket-taker for Hyderabad in the 2017–18 Ranji Trophy, with 16 dismissals in four matches.
