= Tanmay Agarwal =

Indian cricketer (born 1995)

Personal information
- Full name: Tanmay Dharamchand Agarwal
- Born: 3 May 1995 (age 31); Hyderabad, Telangana, India
- Batting: Left-handed
- Bowling: Leg break googly
- Role: Batsman
- Relatives: Nitisha Jalan Agarwal (wife)

Domestic team information
- Years: Team
- 2014–present: Hyderabad

Career statistics
Competition	FC	LA	T20
Matches	42	29	40
Runs scored	2,609	1,084	1,087
Batting average	37.81	40.14	28.60
100s/50s	8/10	2/8	0/5
Top score	366	136	91
Balls bowled	70	6	–
Wickets	0	1	–
Bowling average	–	1.00	–
5 wickets in innings	–	0	–
10 wickets in match	–	0	–
Best bowling	–	1/1	–
Catches/stumpings	19/–	12/–	11/–
- Source: Cricinfo, 6 May 2020

Tanmay Dharamchand Agarwal (born 3 May 1995) is an Indian cricketer who plays for Hyderabad.

A left-handed top-order batsman, Agarwal has also represented Hyderabad at Under-14, Under-16, Under-19, Under-22 and Under-25 levels. He scored centuries on both his first-class and List A debuts for Hyderabad in 2014.

Agarwal holds the world record for the maximum number of sixes in a First Class match, smashing 26 sixes in his innings of 366 against Arunachal Pradesh in a Ranji Trophy match.

Agarwal currently leads the Hyderabad cricket team.

In February 2017, Agarwal was recruited by Sunrisers Hyderabad for the 2017 Indian Premier League for the base price of 10 lakh Indian rupees. In January 2018, he was bought by the Sunrisers Hyderabad in the 2018 IPL auction.
