= Navdeep Singh (cricketer) =

Indian cricketer (born 1974)

Personal information
- Born: 24 January 1974 (age 52); Chandigarh, India

Umpiring information
- WODIs umpired: 3 (2016–2023)
- Source: ESPNcricinfo, 12 October 2015

Navdeep Singh (born 24 January 1974) is an Indian former first-class cricketer. He is now an umpire and has stood in matches in the 2015–16 Ranji Trophy and the final of the 2016–17 Vijay Hazare Trophy.
