= Mehdi Hasan (Indian cricketer) =

Indian cricketer (born 1990)

Personal information
- Full name: Syed Mehdi Hasan
- Born: 3 February 1990 (age 36); Hyderabad, India
- Batting: Left-handed
- Bowling: Slow left-arm orthodox

Domestic team information
- Years: Team
- 2016-present: Hyderabad
- 2018: Sunrisers Hyderabad

Career statistics
Competition	FC	LA	T20
Matches	40	31	25
Runs scored	870	153	49
Batting average	18.12	10.92	16.33
100s/50s	0/4	0/0	0/0
Top score	71*	28*	25
Balls bowled	8,248	1,409	520
Wickets	92	39	29
Bowling average	40.83	26.79	20.00
5 wickets in innings	5	1	0
10 wickets in match	1	0	0
Best bowling	6/93	5/20	3/16
Catches/stumpings	16/–	6/–	5/–
- Source: ESPNcricinfo, 7 May 2020

Syed Mehdi Hasan (born 3 February 1990) is an Indian cricketer who plays for Hyderabad. He made his Twenty20 debut on 10 January 2016 in the 2015–16 Syed Mushtaq Ali Trophy. In January 2018, he was bought by the Sunrisers Hyderabad in the 2018 IPL auction for Rs. 20 Lakhs.

He was the leading wicket-taker for Hyderabad in the 2018–19 Vijay Hazare Trophy, with fifteen dismissals in eight matches.
