= Krishnamachari Bharatan =

Indian cricketer (born 1963)

Personal information
- Full name: Krishnamachari Bharatan
- Born: 5 January 1963 (age 63); Chennai, Tamil Nadu, India
- Role: Umpire

Domestic team information
- Years: Team
- 1987–1997: Railways

Umpiring information
- FC umpired: 42 (2010–2016)
- LA umpired: 38 (2009–2017)
- T20 umpired: 12 (2011–2017)
- Source: ESPNcricinfo, 6 March 2017

Krishnamachari Bharatan (born 5 January 1963) is an Indian former first-class cricketer. He is now an umpire and has stood in matches in the 2015–16 Ranji Trophy.
