= Kolla Sumanth =

Indian cricketer (born 1992)

Personal information
- Born: 24 April 1992 (age 34); Ramagundam, India
- Batting: Right-handed
- Role: Wicket-keeper

Domestic team information
- Years: Team
- 2012–present: Hyderabad

Career statistics
Competition	FC	LA	T20
Matches	37	29	23
Runs scored	1,453	684	204
Batting average	27.41	31.09	11.33
100s/50s	1/10	0/3	0/0
Top score	111*	91*	46*
Catches/stumpings	109/6	36/5	22/4
- Source: ESPNcricinfo, 6 May 2020

Kolla Sumanth (born 24 April 1992) is an Indian first-class cricketer who plays for Hyderabad. He made his Twenty20 debut on 2 January 2016 in the 2015–16 Syed Mushtaq Ali Trophy.

He was named as the player of the tournament in the 2017 Buchi Babu Tournament for scoring 345 runs, the highest in the tournament. On 25 November 2017, Kolla Sumanth captained Hyderabad in their last group match in 2017-18 Ranji Trophy. In January 2020, in the 2019–20 Ranji Trophy match against Kerala, he scored his maiden century in first-class cricket.
