= 2015–16 Vijay Hazare Trophy =

Indian cricket tournament

- Dates: 10 December 2015 – 28 December 2015
- Administrator: BCCI
- Cricket format: List A cricket
- Tournament format(s): Round robin, then knockout
- Champions: Gujarat (1st title)
- Runners-up: Delhi
- Participants: 27
- Most runs: Mandeep Singh (Punjab) (394)
- Most wickets: Jasprit Bumrah (Gujarat) (21)

The 2015–16 Vijay Hazare Trophy was the 23rd edition of the Vijay Hazare Trophy, an annual List A cricket tournament in India. It was held between 10 and 28 December 2015. The final was contested by Delhi and Gujarat, only the second time they had played each other in a one-day match. Gujarat won the final by 139 runs to claim their first Vijay Hazare title. They advanced to play in the 2015–16 Deodhar Trophy.

== Venues ==
| Ground | Capacity |
|---|---|
| M. Chinnaswamy Stadium | 35,000 |
| KSCA Cricket Ground | N/A |
| KSCA Cricket (2) Ground | N/A |
| Feroz Shah Kotla Ground | 42,000 |
| Palam A Stadium | N/A |
| Palam B Stadium | N/A |
| Saurashtra Cricket Association Stadium | 28,000 |
| Madhavrao Scindia Cricket Ground | 15,000 |

== Teams ==
Teams are divided into four groups as follows

| Group A | Group B | Group C | Group D |
|---|---|---|---|
| Assam | Gujarat | Andhra | Bengal |
| Hyderabad (H) | Haryana | Baroda | Goa |
| Mumbai | Jammu & Kashmir | Delhi (H) | Himachal Pradesh |
| Punjab | Jharkhand | Maharashtra | Madhya Pradesh |
| Rajasthan | Karnataka (H) | Odisha | Saurashtra (H) |
| Services | Kerala | Tripura | Uttar Pradesh |
| Tamil Nadu | Railways | Vidarbha | |

- Note: H – Host

== Fixtures ==
=== Group A ===
| Rank | Team | Pld | W | L | T | NR | Pts | NRR |
|---|---|---|---|---|---|---|---|---|
| 1 | Tamil Nadu | 6 | 5 | 1 | 0 | 0 | 20 | +1.254 |
| 2 | Punjab | 6 | 5 | 1 | 0 | 0 | 20 | +0.349 |
| 3 | Mumbai | 6 | 4 | 2 | 0 | 0 | 16 | +0.866 |
| 4 | Services | 6 | 3 | 3 | 0 | 0 | 12 | -0.321 |
| 5 | Rajasthan | 6 | 3 | 3 | 0 | 0 | 12 | -0.772 |
| 6 | Hyderabad | 6 | 1 | 5 | 0 | 0 | 4 | -0.454 |
| 7 | Assam | 6 | 0 | 6 | 0 | 0 | 0 | -0.807 |

- Top two teams advanced to knockout stage

=== Group B ===
| Rank | Team | Pld | W | L | T | NR | Pts | NRR |
|---|---|---|---|---|---|---|---|---|
| 1 | Jharkhand | 6 | 5 | 1 | 0 | 0 | 20 | +0.860 |
| 2 | Gujarat | 6 | 5 | 1 | 0 | 0 | 20 | +0.540 |
| 3 | Karnataka | 6 | 4 | 2 | 0 | 0 | 16 | +1.465 |
| 4 | Railways | 6 | 3 | 3 | 0 | 0 | 12 | -0.083 |
| 5 | Haryana | 6 | 2 | 4 | 0 | 0 | 8 | -0.328 |
| 6 | Kerala | 6 | 2 | 4 | 0 | 0 | 8 | -0.472 |
| 7 | J&K | 6 | 0 | 6 | 0 | 0 | 0 | -1.933 |

- Top two teams advanced to knockout stage

=== Group C ===
| Rank | Team | Pld | W | L | T | NR | Pts | NRR |
|---|---|---|---|---|---|---|---|---|
| 1 | Vidarbha | 6 | 5 | 1 | 0 | 0 | 20 | +1.209 |
| 2 | Delhi | 6 | 5 | 1 | 0 | 0 | 20 | +0.860 |
| 3 | Baroda | 6 | 4 | 2 | 0 | 0 | 16 | +1.114 |
| 4 | Maharashtra | 6 | 3 | 3 | 0 | 0 | 12 | +0.465 |
| 5 | Andhra | 6 | 2 | 4 | 0 | 0 | 8 | -0.844 |
| 6 | Odisha | 6 | 1 | 5 | 0 | 0 | 4 | -0.680 |
| 7 | Assam | 6 | 1 | 5 | 0 | 0 | 4 | -2.407 |

- Top two teams advanced to knockout stage

=== Group D ===
| Rank | Team | Pld | W | L | T | NR | Pts | NRR |
|---|---|---|---|---|---|---|---|---|
| 1 | HP | 5 | 4 | 1 | 0 | 0 | 16 | +1.805 |
| 2 | UP | 5 | 4 | 1 | 0 | 0 | 16 | +0.335 |
| 3 | Saurashtra | 5 | 3 | 2 | 0 | 0 | 12 | +0.373 |
| 4 | MP | 5 | 3 | 2 | 0 | 0 | 12 | +0.305 |
| 5 | Bengal | 5 | 1 | 4 | 0 | 0 | 4 | -0.417 |
| 6 | Goa | 5 | 0 | 5 | 0 | 0 | 0 | -1.851 |

- Top two teams advanced to knockout stage

== Knockout stage ==
Of the 27 participants, the following 8 teams qualified for the knockout stage:

Quarterfinals
D1 | Himachal Pradesh | 266/5 (49.2 ov)
A2 | Punjab | 263/8 (50 ov)
B1 | Jharkhand | 126 (38 ov)
C2 | Delhi | 225 (50 ov)
A1 | Tamil Nadu | 169/9 (41.3 ov)
D2 | Uttar Pradesh | 168 (48.2 ov)
C1 | Vidarbha | 195 (48 ov)
B2 | Gujarat | 198/8 (48.1 ov)

Semifinals
D1 | Himachal Pradesh | 200/9 (50 ov)
C2 | Delhi | 201/4 (41.1 ov)
B2 | Gujarat | 248/8 (50 ov)
A1 | Tamil Nadu | 217 (47.3 ov)

Final
C2 | Delhi | 134 (32.3 ov)
B2 | Gujarat | 273 (50 overs)

=== Quarterfinals ===
23 December 2015
Scorecard

| Punjab; 263/8 (50 overs) | v | Himachal Pradesh; 266/5 (49.2 overs) |
| Mandeep Singh 119 (145); Pankaj Jaiswal 3/50 (10 overs) | | Robin Bist 109* (135); Siddarth Kaul 3/42 (8.2 overs) |

Himachal Pradesh won by 5 wickets
KSCA Cricket Ground, Alur
Umpires: Nitin Menon and C. K. Nandan
Player of the match: Robin Bist (Himachal Pradesh)

- Himachal Pradesh won the toss and elected to field.

23 December 2015
Scorecard

| Delhi; 225 (50 overs) | v | Jharkhand; 126 (38 overs) |
| Nitish Rana 44 (76); Rahul Shukla 3/60 (10 overs) | | MS Dhoni 70* (108); Suboth Bhati 4/21 (10 overs) |

Delhi won by 99 runs
M Chinnaswamy Stadium, Bangalore
Umpires: Krishnamachari Bharatan and Anil Dandekar
Player of the match: Pawan Negi (Delhi)

- Jharkhand won the toss and elected to field.
- Rishabh Pant (Delhi) made his List A debut.

24 December 2015
Scorecard

| Uttar Pradesh; 168 (48.2 overs) | v | Tamil Nadu; 169/9 (41.3 overs) |
| Rinku Singh 60 (97); Lakshmipathy Balaji 3/32 (8.2 overs) | | Baba Indrajith 48 (78); Bhuvneshwar Kumar 3/25 (9 overs) |

Tamil Nadu won by 1 wicket
M Chinnaswamy Stadium, Bangalore
Umpires: Nitin Menon and C. K. Nandan
Player of the match: Rajagopal Sathish (Tamil Nadu)

- Uttar Pradesh won the toss and elected to bat.

24 December 2015
Scorecard

| Vidarbha; 195 (48 overs) | v | Gujarat; 198/8 (48.1 overs) |
| Faiz Fazal 52 (66); Jasprit Bumrah 4/38 (9 overs) | | Parthiv Patel 57 (58); Akshay Wakhare 3/30 (10 overs) |

Gujarat won by 2 wickets
KSCA Cricket Ground, Alur
Umpires: Krishnamachari Bharatan and Nand Kishore
Player of the match: Axar Patel (Gujarat)

- Vidarbha won the toss and elected to bat.

=== Semifinals ===
26 December 2015
Scorecard

| Himachal Pradesh; 200/9 (50 overs) | v | Delhi; 201/4 (41.1 overs) |
| Bipul Sharma 51 (45); Nitish Rana 2/16 (4 overs) | | Unmukt Chand 80* (86); Nikhil Gangta 1/14 (3 overs) |

Delhi won by 6 wickets
M Chinnaswamy Stadium, Bangalore
Umpires: C. K. Nandan and Nand Kishore
Player of the match: Unmukt Chand (Delhi)

- Delhi won the toss and elected to field.
- Mayank Dagar (Himachal Pradesh) made his List A debut.

26 December 2015
Scorecard

| Gujarat; 248/8 (50 overs) | v | Tamil Nadu; 217 (47.3 overs) |
| Chirag Gandhi 71 (82); Ravichandran Ashwin 3/51 (10 overs) | | Abhinav Mukund 104* (142); Axar Patel 6/43 (10 overs) |

Gujarat won by 31 runs
KSCA Cricket Ground, Alur
Umpires: Anil Dandekar and Nitin Menon
Player of the match: Axar Patel (Gujarat)

- Tamil Nadu won the toss and elected to field.

=== Final ===
28 December 2015
Scorecard

| Gujarat; 273 (50 overs) | v | Delhi; 134 (32.3 overs) |
| Parthiv Patel 105 (119); Pawan Negi 2/36 (6 overs) | | Pawan Negi 57 (47); Jasprit Bumrah 5/28 (9.3 overs) |

Gujarat won by 139 runs
M Chinnaswamy Stadium, Bangalore
Umpires: Krishnamachari Bharatan and Nitin Menon
Player of the match: Parthiv Patel and RP Singh (both Gujarat)

- Delhi won the toss and elected to field.
- Karan Patel (Gujarat) made his List A debut.
