= 2015–16 Syed Mushtaq Ali Trophy =

Indian cricket tournament

- Dates: 2 – 20 January 2016
- Administrator(s): BCCI
- Cricket format: T20
- Tournament format(s): Round robin, then knockout
- Champions: Uttar Pradesh (1st title)
- Participants: 27
- Matches: 91
- Most runs: Hardik Pandya (377) (Baroda)
- Most wickets: Irfan Pathan (17) (Baroda)
- Official website: http://www.bcci.tv

The 2015–16 Syed Mushtaq Ali Trophy was the eighth edition of the Syed Mushtaq Ali Trophy, an annual Twenty20 tournament in India. Played from 2 to 20 January 2016, it was contested by all 27 Ranji Trophy teams. Uttar Pradesh won the championship, claiming their first title.

== Teams ==
The teams were divided into 4 groups:

Group A
- Gujarat
- Himachal Pradesh
- Hyderabad
- Bengal
- Tamil Nadu
- Haryana
- Vidarbha (Host)
Group B
- Punjab
- Rajasthan
- Jharkhand
- Saurashtra
- Tripura
- Kerala (Host)
- Jammu & Kashmir
Group C
- Madhya Pradesh
- Andhra
- Delhi
- Railways
- Baroda (Host)
- Assam
- Goa
Group D
- Mumbai
- Odisha (Host)
- Karnataka
- Services
- Uttar Pradesh
- Maharashtra

== Group stage ==
=== Group A ===
Points table

Team	Pld	W	L	Tie	A	Pts	NRR
Vidarbha	6	5	1	0	0	20	0.017
Gujarat	6	4	2	0	0	16	1.559
Tamil Nadu	6	4	2	0	0	16	1.136
Himachal Pradesh	6	3	3	0	0	12	-0.025
Hyderabad	6	2	4	0	0	8	-0.270
Bengal	6	2	4	0	0	8	-0.786
Haryana	6	1	5	0	0	4	-1.406

=== Group B ===
Points table

Team	Pld	W	L	Tie	A	Pts	NRR
Kerala	6	5	1	0	0	20	0.873
Jharkhand	6	5	1	0	0	20	0.799
Saurashtra	6	4	2	0	0	16	1.050
Punjab	6	3	3	0	0	12	0.528
Rajasthan	6	2	4	0	0	8	0.034
Tripura	6	2	4	0	0	8	-1.079
Jammu & Kashmir	6	0	6	0	0	0	-2.235

=== Group C ===
Points table

Team	Pld	W	L	Tie	A	Pts	NRR
Delhi	6	6	0	0	0	36	+1.936
Baroda	6	5	1	0	0	20	1.693
Madhya Pradesh	6	4	2	0	0	16	0.109
Railways	6	2	4	0	0	8	-0.059
Assam	6	2	4	0	0	8	-1.058
Goa	6	1	5	0	0	4	-1.060
Andhra Pradesh	6	1	5	0	0	4	-1.485

=== Group D ===
Points table

Team	Pld	W	L	Tie	A	Pts	NRR
Uttar Pradesh	5	5	0	0	0	20	1.236
Mumbai	5	3	2	0	0	12	0.621
Maharashtra	5	3	2	0	0	12	0.152
Karnataka	5	2	3	0	0	10	-0.210
Services	5	2	3	0	0	8	-0.898
Odisha	5	0	5	0	0	0	-0.819

== Super League ==
=== Super League A ===
Points table

Team	Pld	W	L	Tie	A	Pts	NRR
Baroda	3	2	1	0	0	8	+0.299
Mumbai	3	2	1	0	0	8	+0.196
Kerala	3	2	1	0	0	8	+0.172
Vidarbha	3	0	3	0	0	0	-0.657

Matches

15 January 2016
Scorecard

Vidarbha; 162/5 (20 overs)	v	Baroda; 168/4 (19 overs)
Ganesh Satish 54 (31); Irfan Pathan 1/32 (4 overs)		Hardik Pandya 86 (46); Ravi Jangid 2/36 (3 overs)

Baroda won by 6 wickets
Wankhede Stadium, Mumbai
Umpires: Nand Kishore (Ind) Krishnamachari Srinivasan (Ind)

- Baroda won the toss and elected the field.

15 January 2016
Scorecard

Kerala; 160/7 (20 overs)	v	Mumbai; 164/4 (19.1 vers)
Rohan Prem 69 (45); Sagar Trivedi 3/34 (4 overs)		Aditya Tare 71 (46); Unnikrishnan Manukrishnan 2/36 (4 overs)

Mumbai won by 6 wickets
Wankhede Stadium, Mumbai
Umpires: Krishnamachari Bharatan (Ind) and Subrat Das (Ind)

- Mumbai won the toss and elected to field.

16 January 2016
Scorecard

Baroda; 160/6 (20 overs)	v	Kerala; 164/6 (19.4 overs)
Irfan Pathan 35* (18); Padmanabhan Prasanth 2/15 (4 overs)		Raiphi Gomez 47* (21); Irfan Pathan 2/14 (4 overs)

Kerala won by 4 wickets
Wankhede Stadium, Mumbai
Umpires: Krishnamachari Bharatan and Subrat Das

- Kerala won the toss and elected to field.

16 January 2016
Scorecard

Vidarbha; 181/4 (20 overs)	v	Mumbai; 182/5 (18.5 overs)
Jitesh Sharma 56 (30); Sagar Trivedi 2/44 (4 overs)		Shreyas Iyer 86 (51); Ravikumar Thakur 2/32 (3.5 overs)

Mumbai won by 5 wickets
Wankhede Stadium, Mumbai
Umpires: Nand Kishore and Krishnamachari Srinivasan

- Mumbai won the toss and elected to field.

18 January 2016
Scorecard

Vidarbha; 105 (19.3 overs)	v	Kerala; 109/8 (18.4 overs)
Urvesh Patel 28 (25); Nizar Niyas 3/14 (4 overs)		Rohan Prem 34 (34); Akshay Wakhare 3/26 (4 overs)

Kerala won by 2 wickets
Wankhede Stadium, Mumbai
Umpires: Krishnamachari Bharatan (Ind) and Subrat Das (Ind)

- Kerala won the toss and elected to field.

18 January 2016
Scorecard

Mumbai; 151/5 (20 overs)	v	Baroda; 153/9 (19 overs)
Suryakumar Yadav 57 (36); Bhargav Bhatt 2/25 (4 overs)		Deepak Hooda 53 (35); Pravin Tambe 3/26 (4 overs)

Baroda won by 1 wicket
Wankhede Stadium, Mumbai
Umpires: Nand Kishore and Krishnamachari Srinivasan

- Baroda won the toss and elected to field.
- Shivam Dube (Mumbai) made his T20 debut.

=== Super League B ===
Points table

Team	Pld	W	L	Tie	A	Pts	NRR
Uttar Pradesh	3	3	0	0	0	12	+0.688
Gujarat	3	2	1	0	0	8	+1.180
Delhi	3	1	2	0	0	4	-0.059
Jharkhand	3	0	3	0	0	0	-1.714

Matches

15 January 2016
Scorecard

Delhi; 170/5 (20 overs)	v	Gujarat; 171/2 (17.3 overs)
Unmukt Chand 103 (58); RP Singh 1/29 (4 overs)		Priyank Kirit Panchal 68* (45); Parvinder Awana 1/23 (3 overs)

Gujarat won by 8 wickets
Bandra Kurla Complex, Mumbai
Umpires: Belur Ravi (Ind) and Chirra Ravikanthreddy (Ind)

- Gujarat won the toss and elected to field.

15 January 2016
Scorecard

Jharkhand; 133/7 (20 overs)	v	Uttar Pradesh; 134/1 (16.5 overs)
Shasheem Rathour 40 (43); Amit Mishra 2/14 (4 overs)		Samarth Singh 64 (49); Kaushal Singh 1/18 (1.5 overs)

Uttar Pradesh won by 9 wickets
Bandra Kurla Complex, Mumbai
Umpires: Anil Dandekar (Ind) and Rajesh Deshpande (Ind)

- Uttar Pradesh won the toss and elected to field.

16 January 2016
Scorecard

Gujarat; 165/6 (20 overs)	v	Uttar Pradesh; 167/3 (19 overs)
Manpreet Juneja 54 (40); Praveen Kumar 2/32 (4 overs)		Samarth Singh 65* (47); Rush Kalaria 2/19 (3 overs)

Uttar Pradesh won by 7 wickets
Bandra Kurla Complex, Mumbai
Umpires: Belur Ravi and Chirra Ravikanthreddy

- Uttar Pradesh won the toss and elected to field.

16 January 2016
Scorecard

Jharkhand; 134/7 (20 overs)	v	Delhi; 138/5 (18 overs)
Virat Singh 45 (44); Parvinder Awana 3/28 (4 overs)		Nitish Rana 60* (44); Varun Aaron 3/27 (4 overs)

Delhi won by 5 wickets
Bandra Kurla Complex, Mumbai
Umpires: Anil Dandekar and Rajesh Deshpande

- Delhi won the toss and elected to field.

18 January 2016
Scorecard

Jharkhand; 142/6 (20 overs)	v	Gujarat; 146/4 (14.1 overs)
Ishank Jaggi 39 (24); Rush Kalaria 2/34 (4 overs)		Priyank Kirit Panchal 35 (28); Kaushal Singh 2/21 (2 overs)

Gujarat won by 6 wickets
Bandra Kurla Complex, Mumbai
Umpires: Belur Ravi (Ind) and Chirra Ravikanthreddy (Ind)

- Gujarat won the toss and elected to field.
- Santosh Shinde (Gujarat) made his T20 debut.

18 January 2016
Scorecard

Delhi; 158/6 (20 overs)	v	Uttar Pradesh; 159/7 (19.4 overs)
Unmukt Chand 48 (35); Amit Mishra 2/25 (4 overs)		Eklavya Dwivedi 49* (35); Navdeep Saini 2/24 (4 overs)

Uttar Pradesh won by 3 wickets
Bandra Kurla Complex, Mumbai
Umpires: Anil Dandekar and Rajesh Deshpande

- Uttar Pradesh won the toss and elected to field.

== Final ==
20 January 2016
18:30 Local (D/N)
Scorecard

Uttar Pradesh; 163/7 (20 overs)	v	Baroda; 125/7 (20 overs)
Prashant Gupta 49 (41); Bhargav Bhatt 2/13 (2 overs)		Soaeb Tai 26* (23); Ankit Rajpoot 3/30 (4 overs)

Uttar Pradesh won by 38 runs
Wankhede Stadium, Mumbai
Umpires: Krishnamachari Srinivasan (Ind) and Nand Kishore (Ind)
Player of the match: Suresh Raina (Uttar Pradesh)

- Baroda won the toss and elected to field.
- Uttar Pradesh remained unbeaten during the tournament.

== Statistics ==
=== Batting ===
Source: Cricinfo

Player	Team	Matches	Runs	Ave.	SR	HS	100	50
Hardik Pandya	Baroda	10	377	53.85	130.90	86*	0	2
Rohan Prem	Kerala	9	356	44.50	117.10	69	0	3
Jitesh Sharma	Vidarbha	9	343	38.11	143.51	106	1	2
Parthiv Patel	Gujarat	9	337	42.12	162.80	70	0	4
Prashant Gupta	Uttar Pradesh	9	317	39.62	118.72	53	0	1

=== Bowling ===
Source: Cricinfo

Player	Team	Matches	Wickets	Econ.	Ave.	BBI	4WI	5WI
Irfan Pathan	Baroda	10	17	7.30	15.76	5/13	1	1
Piyush Chawla	Uttar Pradesh	9	15	5.94	13.86	4/28	1	0
Dhawal Kulkarni	Mumbai	8	15	6.72	14.20	3/35	0	0
CV Stephen	Andhra	6	14	5.80	8.50	5/52	2	1
Nathu Singh	Rajasthan	6	14	5.00	8.57	4/13	2	0
