= 2013–14 Ranji Trophy =

Cricket tournament

- Dates: 27 October 2013 – 2 February 2014
- Administrator: BCCI
- Cricket format: First-class cricket
- Tournament format(s): Round-robin and knockout
- Champions: Karnataka (7th title)
- Participants: 27
- Matches: 115
- Most runs: Kedar Jadhav (Maharashtra) (1223)
- Most wickets: Rishi Dhawan (Himachal Pradesh) (49)
- Official website: www.bcci.tv

The 2013–14 Ranji Trophy was the 80th season of the Ranji Trophy. It included the final match of Sachin Tendulkar's domestic career. The competition was won by Karnataka, who defeated Maharashtra in the final.

== Points system ==
- Basic
  - Win: 6 points
  - Loss: 0 points
  - Draw: 1 point
  - Abandoned: 1 point
- Bonus
  - Win by an innings or 10 wickets: +1 point
  - First innings lead in draw: +2 points

== Group A ==
=== Points table ===
| Team | Pld | W | L | D | A | WI | FI | Pts | Q |
|---|---|---|---|---|---|---|---|---|---|
| Karnataka | 8 | 5 | 0 | 3 | 0 | 1 | 2 | 38 | 1.355 |
| Punjab | 8 | 4 | 2 | 2 | 0 | 2 | 1 | 30 | 1.156 |
| Mumbai | 8 | 4 | 1 | 3 | 0 | 0 | 1 | 29 | 1.144 |
| Gujarat | 8 | 2 | 1 | 5 | 0 | 1 | 4 | 26 | 1.214 |
| Delhi | 8 | 2 | 2 | 3 | 1 | 1 | 1 | 19 | 1.182 |
| Odisha | 8 | 1 | 3 | 4 | 0 | 0 | 1 | 12 | 0.730 |
| Vidarbha | 8 | 1 | 3 | 4 | 0 | 0 | 1 | 12 | 0.699 |
| Haryana | 8 | 1 | 5 | 2 | 0 | 0 | 1 | 10 | 0.950 |
| Jharkhand | 8 | 0 | 3 | 4 | 1 | 0 | 2 | 9 | 0.759 |

- Top three teams advance to knockout stage.
- Bottom place team will be relegated to Group C for 2014–15 Ranji Trophy.

=== Fixtures ===
27–30 October
Scorecard

| Delhi | v | Jharkhand (H) |

Match abandoned
Keenan Stadium, Jamshedpur
Umpires: Abhijit Deshmukh and Sanjay Hazare

- Match abandoned due to rain.

27–30 October
Scorecard

| Haryana (H) | v | Mumbai |
| 134 (35.3 overs); Mohit Sharma 49 (62); Abhishek Nayar 4/38 (10 overs) | | 136 (62 overs); Ajinkya Rahane 51 (108); Joginder Sharma 5/16 (11 overs) |
| 241 (70 overs); Sunny Singh 63 (78); Vishal Dabholkar 4/54 (15 overs) | | 240/6 (93 overs); Sachin Tendulkar 79* (175); Mohit Sharma 2/79 (27 overs) |

Mumbai won by 4 wickets
Chaudhary Bansi Lal Cricket Stadium, Rohtak
Umpires: Krishnamachari Bharatan and Shavir Tarapore

- Mumbai won the toss and elected to field.

27–30 October
Scorecard

| Odisha | v | Punjab (H) |
| 205 (83.2 overs); Govind Podder 42 (117); Harbhajan Singh 6/54 (28.2 overs) | | 560/6d (150 overs); Mandeep Singh 175 (229); Deepak Behera 2/108 (27 overs) |
| 307 (91.4 overs); Abhilash Mallick 73 (116); Sandeep Sharma 3/64 (21 overs) |

Punjab won by an innings and 48 runs
Punjab Cricket Association Stadium, Mohali
Umpires: Jayaraman Madanagopal and Amiesh Saheba

- Punjab won the toss and elected to field.

27–29 October
Scorecard

| Vidarbha (H) | v | Gujarat |
| 85 (32.4 overs); Faiz Fazal 31 (81); Rush Kalaria 5/32 (9.4 overs) | | 304 (106.5 overs); Smit Patel 73 (144); Shrikant Wagh 4/71 (24.5 overs) |
| 218 (99.4 overs); Faiz Fazal 77 (197); Rakesh Dhurv 5/21 (20.4 overs) |

Gujarat won by an innings and 1 run
Vidarbha Cricket Association Ground, Nagpur
Umpires: CK Nandan and Ammanabrole Nand Kishore

- Gujarat won the toss and elected to field.

7–10 November
Scorecard

| Gujarat (H) | v | Delhi |
| 320 (104 overs); Venugopal Rao 107 (190); Sumit Narwal 6/71 (17 overs) | | 295 (126.4 overs); Mithun Manhas 104 (256); Akshar Patel 6/55 (45 overs) |
| 231 (77.4 overs); Parthiv Patel 56 (84); Vikas Mishra 4/83 (30.4 overs) | | 100/3 (32 overs); Gautam Gambhir 44 (83); Akshar Patel 1/20 (11 overs) |

Match drawn
Lalabhai Contractor Stadium, Surat
Umpires: Sanjeev Dua and Saiyed Khalid

- Gujarat won the toss and elected to bat.

7–10 November
Scorecard

| Jharkhand (H) | v | Karnataka |
| 364 (136.4 overs); Shahbaz Nadeem 85 (113); Sreenath Aravind 4/60 (30 overs) | | 424/7d (109 overs); Mayank Agarwal 90 (144); Rahul Shukla 3/106 (20 overs) |
| 215/5d (80.1 overs); Bhavik Thaker 63 (162); Ganesh Satish 1/5 (2.1 overs) |

Match drawn
Gangothri Glades Cricket Ground, Mysore
Umpires: Ulhas Gandhe and Virender Sharma

- Karnataka won the toss and elected to field.

7–10 November
Scorecard

| Mumbai | v | Punjab (H) |
| 282 (91.2 overs); Wasim Jaffer 111 (208); Harbhajan Singh 4/90 (26 overs) | | 155 (63.5 overs); Yuvraj Singh 33 (73); Vishal Dabholkar 6/38 (22.5 overs) |
| 271 (64.4 overs); Suryakumar Yadav 62 (61); Rajwinder Singh 5/102 (23 overs) | | 214 (68.3 overs); Yuvraj Singh 40 (94); Vishal Dabholkar 4/87 (25 overs) |

Mumbai won by 184 runs
Sector 16 Stadium, Chandigarh
Umpires: Krishnamachari Srinivasan and Ravi Subramanian

- Mumbai won the toss and elected to bat.

7–10 November
Scorecard

| Haryana | v | Vidarbha (H) |
| 329 (136.1 overs); Sunny Singh 123 (265); Akshay Wakhare 5/68 (38.1 overs) | | 287 (113 overs); Hemang Badani 65 (128); Jayant Yadav 5/77 (32 overs) |
| 102 (46.5 overs); Avi Barot 24 (46); Shrikant Wagh 5/30 (10.5 overs) | | 145/2 (33.2 overs); Faiz Fazal 50* (97); Mohit Sharma 1/26 (7 overs) |

Vidarbha won by 8 wickets
Vidarbha Cricket Association Stadium, Nagpur
Umpires: Rajesh Deshpande and Piyush Khakhar

- Haryana won the toss and elected to bat.

14–17 November
Scorecard

| Haryana (H) | v | Jharkhand |
| 309 (93 overs); Rahul Dalal 58 (135); Varun Aaron 4/48 (18 overs) | | 231 (83 overs); Saurabh Tiwary 95 (188); Mohit Sharma 4/30 (10 overs) |
| 124 (45.3 overs); Sachin Rana 84 (142); Shankar Rao 4/35 (12 overs) | | 172 (73.4 overs); Bhavin Thakkar 64 (193); Mohit Sharma 4/51 (20.4 overs) |

Haryana won by 30 runs
Chaudhary Bansi Lal Cricket Stadium, Rohtak
Umpires: K. N. Ananthapadmanabhan and Amiesh Saheba

- Haryana won the toss and elected to bat.

14–17 November
Scorecard

| Karnataka (H) | v | Gujarat |
| 306 (104.1 overs); Ganesh Satish 75* (137); Rakesh Dhurv 4/83 (24.1 overs) | | 411 (139.2 overs); Bhargav Merai 142 (264); Abhimanyu Mithun 4/94 (32.2 overs) |
| 245/4 (59 overs); Stuart Binny 114 (99); Akshar Patel 2/55 (18 overs) |

Match drawn
M. Chinnaswamy Stadium, Bangalore
Umpires: Sudhir Asnani and Tapan Sharma

- Gujarat won the toss and elected to field.

14–17 November
Scorecard

| Mumbai (H) | v | Delhi |
| 324 (112.2 overs); Siddhesh Lad 74 (137); Parvinder Awana 5/72 (27 overs) | | 324 (98.4 overs); Mithun Manhas 113 (196); Zaheer Khan 5/88 (25.4 overs) |
| 347/6d (70 overs); Aditya Tare 122 (134); Pawan Suyal 3/52 (13 overs) | | 198/0 (48 overs); Unmukt Chand 106* (154); Kaustubh Pawar 0/14 (4 overs) |

Match drawn
Bandra Kurla Complex Ground, Mumbai
Umpires: CK Nandan and Krishnamachari Srinivasan

- Mumbai won the toss and elected to bat.

14–17 November
Scorecard

| Odisha (H) | v | Vidarbha |
| 453/6d (174 overs); Niranjan Behera 131 (363); Amol Jungade 4/56 (32 overs) | | 124 (169.1 overs); Faiz Fazal 124 (297); Basant Mohanty 5/59 (38.1 overs) |

Match drawn
Vidarbha Cricket Association Stadium, Jamtha, Nagpur
Umpires: Sanjay Hazare and Milind Pathak

- Odisha won the toss and elected to bat.

21–24 November
Scorecard

| Delhi (H) | v | Haryana |
| 201 (87.5 overs); Rajat Bhatia 39 (98); Sanjay Budhwar 4/56 (21 overs) | | 138 (55 overs); Joginder Sharma 35 (38); Ishant Sharma 5/29 (17 overs) |
| 312/5d (68 overs); Gautam Gambhir 153 (215); Ashish Hooda 2/38 (14 overs) | | 270 (70 overs); Sachin Rana 86* (124); Varun Sood 4/49 (15 overs) |

Delhi won by 105 runs
Roshanara Club Ground, Delhi
Umpires: Jayaraman Madanagopal and CK Nandan

- Haryana won the toss and elected to field.

21–24 November
Scorecard

| Jharkhand | v | Odisha (H) |
| 221 (67.4 overs); Saurabh Tiwary 67 (96); Basant Mohanty 5/60 (20.4 overs) | | 307 (118.4 overs); Bikas Pati 94 (251); Ajay Yadav 5/61 (27.4 overs) |
| 194 (73.4 overs); Pappu Singh 61 (193); Basant Mohanty 6/88 (26 overs) | | 109/1 (30 overs); Girjia Rout 67* (98); Varun Aaron 1/20 (5 overs) |

Odisha won by 9 wickets
DRIEMS Ground, Tangi, Cuttack
Umpires: KN Ananthapadmanabhan and Anil Dandekar

- Odisha won the toss and elected to field.

21–24 November
Scorecard

| Punjab (H) | v | Gujarat |
| 172 (70.1 overs); Jiwanjot Singh 86 (196); Jasprit Bumrah 5/52 (22.1 overs) | | 127 (43.3 overs); Bhavesh Baria 43 (73); Sandeep Sharma 4/59 (17 overs) |
| 309 (111.5 overs); Uday Kaul 52* (93); Jasprit Bumrah 3/63 (30 overs) | | 224/3 (101.5 overs); Samit Gohel 102* (280); Sandeep Sharma 2/43 (21 overs) |

Match drawn
Punjab Cricket Association Stadium, Mohali, Chandigarh
Umpires: Sudhir Asnani and S. Shankar

- Gujarat won the toss and elected to field.

21–24 November
Scorecard

| Vidarbha (H) | v | Karnataka |
| 542 (197.4 overs); Shalabh Shrivastava 193 (488); HS Sharath 4/104 (41.4 overs) | | 549/9 (148.1 overs); Lokesh Rahul 158 (259); Akshay Wakhare 3/113 (38 overs) |

Match drawn
Vidarbha Cricket Association Stadium, Jamtha, Nagpur
Umpires: Rajesh Deshpande and Rohan Pandit

- Vidarbha won the toss and elected to bat.

28–30 November
Scorecard

| Haryana (H) | v | Punjab |
| 163 (59.1 overs); Avi Barot 65 (112); V. R. V. Singh 5/38 (16 overs) | | 184 (57.4 overs); Gurkeerat Singh 51 (48); Sanjay Budhwar 4/46 (18 overs) |
| 155 (53.2 overs); Sachin Rana 31 (48); Sandeep Sharma 6/50 (17.2 overs) | | 135/7 (45 overs); Sandeep Sharma 37* (65); Mohit Sharma 3/38 (14 overs) |

Punjab won by 3 wickets
Chaudhary Bansi Lal Cricket Stadium, Rohtak
Umpires: Rajesh Deshpande and Nitin Menon

- Haryana won the toss and elected to bat.

28 November – 1 December
Scorecard

| Jharkhand (H) | v | Gujarat |
| 289 (120.5 overs); Saurabh Tiwary 91 (239); Jasprit Bumrah 5/79 (34.5 overs) | | 352/9d (122.2 oversS); Parthiv Patel 189 (298); Samar Quadri 4/73 (28.2 overs) |
| 166/7 (98 overs); Bhavin Thakkar 50* (235); Jasprit Bumrah 3/27 (22 overs)) |

Match drawn
Keenan Stadium, Jamshedpur
Umpires: K. N. Ananthapadmanabhan and Sudhir Asnani

- Jharkhand won the toss and elected to bat

28 November – 1 December
Scorecard

| Mumbai (H) | v | Vidarbha |
| 261 (93.5 overs); Wasim Jaffer 139 (273); Sandeep Singh 4/35 (21.5 overs) | | 113 (41.4 overs); Rashmi Parida 34 (60); Shardul Thakur 3/40 (11 overs) |
| 381/4 (80 overs); Aditya Tare 172 (190); Ravi Jangid 2/88 (21 overs) | | 191 (46.4 overs); Shalabh Shrivastava 69 (91); Shardul Thakur 4/48 (12.4 overs) |

Mumbai won by 338 runs
Wankhede stadium, Mumbai
Umpires: Ammanabrole Nand Kishore and Krishnaraj Srinath

- Vidarbha won the toss and elected to field

28 November – 1 December
Scorecard

| Odisha (H) | v | Karnataka |
| 226 (71.1 overs); Abhilash Mallick 98 (122); Abhimanyu Mithun 6/52 (21.5 overs) | | 379 (117.3 overs); Manish Pandey 132 (236); Suryakant Pradhan 3/66 (16 overs) |
| 279 (88.3 overs); Biplab Samantray 106 (215); Abhimanyu Mithun 5/58 (22 overs) | | 130/6 (41.3 overs); Ganesh Satish 34 (49); Basant Mohanty 2/34 (15 overs) |

Karnataka won by 4 wickets
DRIEMS Ground, Tangi, Cuttack
Umpires: Navdeep Singh and Rohan Pandit

- Karnataka won the toss and elected to field

6–9 December
Scorecard

| Haryana (H) | v | Karnataka |
| 247 (76.5 overs); Nitin Saini 109 (152); Stuart Binny 3/43 (15 overs) | | 256 (93.2 overs); Lokesh Rahul 98 (239); Harshal Patel 6/55 (28.2 overs) |
| 105 (48.3 overs); Rahul Dewan 31 (86); Ronit More 5/20 (14 overs) | | 97/7 (33.5 overs); Stuart Binny 31* (30); Harshal Patel 5/41 (16.5 overs) |

Karnataka won by 3 wickets
Chaudhary Bansi Lal Cricket Stadium, Rohtak
Umpires: Sanjay Hazare and Rohan Pandit

- Karnataka won the toss and elected to field.

6–9 December
Scorecard

| Jharkhand | v | Mumbai (H) |
| 351 (102.1 overs); Saurabh Tiwary 238 (299); Javed Khan 4/79 (23 overs) | | 265 (91.5 overs); Aditya Tare 67 (120); Varun Aaron 4/42 (22 overs) |
| 278/7d (88.5 overs); Ishank Jaggi 103* (172); Abhishek Nayar 2/39 (18 overs) | | 115/5 (57 overs); Aditya Tare 36 (78); Shahbaz Nadeem 2/23 (16 overs) |

Match drawn
Wankhede Stadium, Mumbai
Umpires: Tapan Sharma and Shavir Tarapore

- Mumbai won the toss and elected to field.

6–9 December
Scorecard

| Delhi | v | Odisha (H) |
| 442 (134.3 overs); Rajat Bhatia 158* (258); Deepak Behera 3/107 (35 overs) | | 379 (115.3 overs); Natraj Behera 158 (290); Parvinder Awana 5/97 (26 overs) |
| 221/6d (79.2 overs); Vaibhav Rawal 51 (101); Suryakant Pradhan 2/48 (12 overs) | | 37/0 (14 overs); Deepak Behera 19* (41) |

Match drawn
Veer Surendra Sai Stadium, Sambalpur
Umpires: Belur Ravi and Amiesh Saheba

- Odisha won the toss and elected to field.

6–9 December
Scorecard

| Punjab (H) | v | Vidarbha |
| 184 (47.4 overs); Mandeep Singh 56 (54); Shrikant Wagh 3/34 (15 overs) | | 360 (128 overs); Ravi Jangid 104 (209); Sandeep Sharma 5/90 (38 overs) |
| 469/6d (97 overs); Jiwanjot Singh 200 (217); Ravi Thakur 2/84 (22 overs) | | 186/3 (52.2 overs); Akshay Kolhar 91 (154); Taruwar Kohli 1/31 (10.2 overs) |

Match drawn
Punjab Cricket Association Stadium, Mohali, Chandigarh
Umpires: Krishnamachari Srinivasan and R Sundar

- Vidarbha won the toss and elected to field.

14–17 December
Scorecard

| Vidarbha | v | Delhi (H) |
| 88 (31.1 overs); Amol Jungade 28 (51); Ashish Nehra 6/16 (10 overs) | | 448/9d (138.5 overs); Mithun Manhas 100 (123); Faiz Fazal 4/48 (19 overs) |
| 204 (63.1 overs); Faiz Fazal 90 (164); Parvinder Awana 3/29 (11 overs) |

Delhi won by an innings and 156 runs
Roshanara Club Ground, Delhi
Umpires: Saiyed Khalid and CK Nandan

- Delhi won the toss and elected to field.

14–17 December
Scorecard

| Haryana | v | Gujarat (H) |
| 573/6d (171 overs); Sunny Singh 201 (381); Rush Kalaria 3/125 (35 overs) | | 578/8 (172 overs); Bhargav Merai 198 (344); Amit Mishra 4/169 (47 overs) |

Match drawn
Sardar Patel Stadium, Motera, Ahmedabad
Umpires: Jayaraman Madanagopal and S. Ravi

- Haryana won the toss and elected to bat.

14–17 December
Scorecard

| Punjab | v | Karnataka (H) |
| 174 (54.5 overs); Manan Vohra 69 (94); KP Appanna 3/29 (8.5 overs) | | 505/9d (156 overs); Manish Pandey 161 (266); Manpreet Gony 3/98 (31 overs) |
| 361 (99.1 overs); Gurkeerat Singh 157 (197); Abhimanyu Mithun 3/59 (19 overs) | | 33/0 (4.5 overs); Lokesh Rahul 25* (13) |

Karnataka won by 10 wickets
Karnataka State Cricket Association Stadium, Hubli
Umpires: Milind Pathak and Suresh Shastri

- Karnataka won the toss and elected to field.

14–17 December
Scorecard

| Mumbai (H) | v | Odisha |
| 501/9d (157 overs); Hiken Shah 170 (275); Basant Mohanty 3/73 (45 overs) | | 256 (63.5 overs); Natraj Behera 130 (184); Javed Khan 4/53 (14 overs) |
| | | 356/5 (122 overs); Natraj Behera 127* (218); Pravin Tambe 2/127 (33 overs) |

Match drawn
Wankhede Stadium, Mumbai
Umpires: Sudhir Asnani and Ulhas Gandhe

- Mumbai won the toss and elected to bat.

22–25 December
Scorecard

| Punjab | v | Delhi (H) |
| 74 (26.4 overs); Manpreet Gony 29 (24); Ashish Nehra 4/31 (11 overs) | | 150 (45.1 overs); Unmukt Chand 55 (109); Manpreet Gony 3/42 (14.1 overs) |
| 402 (121 overs); Jiwanjot Singh 147 (280); Ashish Nehra 4/101 (25 overs) | | 228 (91.3 overs); Rajat Bhatia 100 (182); Jaskaran Singh 3/45 (20.3 overs) |

Punjab won by 98 runs
Roshanara Club Ground, Delhi
Umpires: KN Ananthapadmanabhan and Chettithody Shamsuddin

- Delhi won the toss and elected to field.

22–25 December
Scorecard

| Gujarat (H) | v | Odisha |
| 479/8d (136.3 overs); Venugopal Rao 177 (277); Jayanta Behera 3/111 (28 overs) | | 367 (144.2 overs); Natraj Behera 106 (224); Rakesh Dhurv 6/81 (34.2 overs) |
| 137/7d (22 overs); Akshar Patel 54* (48); Govind Podder 1/19 (3 overs) | | 83 (46.5 overs); Govind Podder 27* (129); Akshar Patel 5/23 (17 overs) |

Gujarat won by 166 runs
Sardar Vallabhbhai Patel Stadium, Ahmedabad
Umpires: Krishnaraj Srinath and Tapan Sharma

- Gujarat won the toss and elected to bat.

22–25 December
Scorecard

| Jharkhand (H) | v | Vidarbha |
| 332 (141.1 overs); Rameez Nemat 85 (221); Akshay Wakhare 5/82 (45 overs) | | 218 (93.2 overs); Faiz Fazal 89 (255); Samar Quadri 6/65 (27.2 overs) |
| 161/9d (43.2 overs); Saurabh Tiwary 44 (68); Shrikant Wagh 4/39 (11 overs) | | 164/3d (59 overs); Faiz Fazal 91 (170); Samar Quadri 2/61 (20 overs) |

Match drawn
Keenan Stadium, Jamshedpur
Umpires: Vineet Kulkarni and Belur Ravi

- Jharkhand won the toss and elected to bat.

22–25 December
Scorecard

| Karnataka (H) | v | Mumbai |
| 251 (98.3 overs); Lokesh Rahul 133 (291); Shardul Thakur 4/65 (22.3 overs) | | 269 (89.4 overs); Siddhesh Lad 93 (168); HS Sharath 5/57 (21.4 overs) |
| 299 (78.3 overs); Manish Pandey 119 (147); Javed Khan 3/69 (15 overs) | | 121 (51.3 overs); Hiken Shah 28 (81); HS Sharath 3/12 (10 overs) |

Karnataka won by 160 runs
M. Chinnaswamy Stadium, Bangalore
Umpires: Anil Chaudhary and Nitin Pandit

- Mumbai won the toss and elected to field.

30 December – 2 January
Scorecard

| Delhi (H) | v | Karnataka |
| 202 (67.4 overs); Gautam Gambhir 54 (111); Vinay Kumar 4/40 (13 overs) | | 289 (99.4 overs); Karun Nair 105 (232); Ashish Nehra 3/39 (20 overs) |
| 201 (77.4 overs); Mithun Manhas 32 (43); Shreyas Gopal 3/23 (7.4 overs) | | 116/2 (28.1 overs); Mayank Agarwal 68* (96); Sumit Narwal 1/24 (9 overs) |

Karnataka won by 8 wickets
Feroz Shah Kotla Ground, Delhi
Umpires: Michael Gough (Eng) and Vineet Kulkarni

- Delhi won the toss and elected to bat.

30 December – 2 January
Scorecard

| Mumbai | v | Gujarat (H) |
| 154 (52.5 overs); Kaustubh Pawar 37 (150); Akshar Patel 3/32 (18.5 overs) | | 253 (104.2 overs); Samit Gohel 58 (171); Iqbal Abdulla 6/42 (25.2 overs) |
| 273 (103.3 overs); Hiken Shah 48 (174); Jasprit Bumrah 4/68 (25.3 overs) | | 147 (56 overs); Akshar Patel 65 (99); Iqbal Abdulla 5/44 (19 overs) |

Mumbai won by 27 runs
Sardar Vallabhbhai Patel Stadium, Valsad
Umpires: Krishnamachari Bharatan and Chettithody Shamshuddin

- Mumbai won the toss and elected to bat.

30 December – 2 January
Scorecard

| Punjab | v | Jharkhand (H) |
| 516 (117.5 overs); Manan Vohra 187 (273); Shahbaz Nadeem 4/165 (39.5 overs) | | 216 (60 overs); Rameez Nemat 81 (122); Rajwinder Singh 5/68 (25 overs) |
| | | 127 (34.1 overs); Rameez Nemat 48 (85); Gurkeerat Singh 4/59 (11 overs) |

Punjab won by an innings and 173 runs
Railway Stadium, Dhanbad
Umpires: Sanjay Hazare and Jayaraman Madanagopal

- Punjab won the toss and elected to bat.

30 December – 2 January
Scorecard

| Odisha (H) | v | Haryana |
| 242 (100.3 overs); Girjia Rout 94 (227); Amit Mishra 4/83 (27 overs) | | 626/4d (149 overs); Rahul Dewan 273 (461); Niranjan Behera 2/68 (24 overs) |
| 228/6 (97 overs); Govind Podder 79 (204); Jayant Yadav 2/30 (22 overs) |

Match drawn
East Coast Railway Stadium, Bhubaneswar
Umpires: Nitin Menon and Krishnaraj Srinath

- Odisha won the toss and elected to bat.

== Group B ==
=== Points table ===
| Team | Pld | W | L | D | A | WI | FI | Pts | Q |
|---|---|---|---|---|---|---|---|---|---|
| Railways | 8 | 3 | 0 | 5 | 0 | 1 | 2 | 28 | 1.186 |
| Uttar Pradesh | 8 | 2 | 1 | 5 | 0 | 1 | 3 | 24 | 1.130 |
| Bengal | 8 | 2 | 0 | 5 | 1 | 0 | 3 | 24 | 1.037 |
| Saurashtra | 8 | 2 | 1 | 5 | 0 | 1 | 2 | 22 | 1.333 |
| Baroda | 8 | 3 | 4 | 0 | 1 | 1 | 0 | 20 | 0.985 |
| Rajasthan | 8 | 2 | 2 | 4 | 0 | 0 | 2 | 20 | 0.947 |
| Tamil Nadu | 8 | 1 | 1 | 6 | 0 | 0 | 3 | 18 | 1.144 |
| Madhya Pradesh | 8 | 0 | 2 | 6 | 0 | 0 | 3 | 12 | 0.895 |
| Services | 8 | 0 | 4 | 4 | 0 | 0 | 1 | 6 | 0.619 |

- Top three teams advance to knockout stage.
- Bottom place team will be relegated to Group C for 2014–15 Ranji Trophy.

=== Fixtures ===
27–30 October
Scorecard

| Bengal (H) | v | Baroda |

Match abandoned
Eden Gardens, Kolkata
Umpires: Puttarangaiah Jayapal and Krishnaraj Srinath

27–30 October
Scorecard

| Madhya Pradesh (H) | v | Railways |
| 510/6d (163 overs); Satyam Choudhary 239 (496); Karn Sharma 2/114 (28 overs) | | 335 (104.5 overs); Shivakant Shukla 113 (220); Ishwar Pandey 8/84 (27.5 overs) |
| | | 235/6 (f/o) (78 overs); Arindam Ghosh 72* (164); Ishwar Pandey 3/36 (18 overs) |

Match drawn
Holkar Cricket Stadium, Indore
Umpires: Umesh Dubey and Suresh Shastri

- Railways won the toss and elected to field.

27–30 October
Scorecard

| Saurashtra (H) | v | Rajasthan |
| 475/7d (183 overs); Sagar Jogiyani 133 (340); Ramesh Powar 4/177 (61 overs) | | 136 (43.1 overs); Robin Bist 29 (39); Kamlesh Makvana 3/30 (11 overs) |
| | | 308 (f/o) (91.3 overs); Rajesh Bishnoi 106 (139); Dharmendrasinh Jadeja 4/108 (38 overs) |

Saurashtra won by an innings and 31 runs
Saurashtra Cricket Association Stadium, Rajkot
Umpires: Subrat Das and Belur Ravi

- Saurashtra won the toss and elected to bat.

27–30 October
Scorecard

| Tamil Nadu | v | Services (H) |
| 456/7d (167 overs); Baba Aparajith 203 (395); Suraj Yadav 2/63 (28 overs) | | 346 (128.5 overs); Yashpal Singh 98 (190); Lakshmipathy Balaji 3/56 (20.5 overs) |
| 117/5 (42.1 overs); Abhinav Mukund 33 (93); Shadab Nazar 1/9 (6 overs) |

Match drawn
Palam A Ground, Model Sports Complex, Delhi
Umpires: Sudhir Asnani and Tapan Sharma

- Tamil Nadu won the toss and elected to bat.

7–10 November
Scorecard

| Uttar Pradesh | v | Baroda (H) |
| 302 (91.2 overs); Suresh Raina 123 (154); Utkarsh Patel 5/78 (29 overs) | | 228 (92.4 overs); Saurabh Wakaskar 70 (139); R. P. Singh 4/50 (18.4 overs) |
| 294/6d (83 overs); Tanmay Srivastava 125* (215); Utkarsh Patel 3/82 (25 overs) | | 186 (64.3 overs); Ambati Rayudu 56* (94); Praveen Gupta 4/14 (10.3 overs) |

Uttar Pradesh won by 182 runs
Moti Bagh Stadium, Vadodara
Umpires: Navdeep Singh and R. Sundar

- Uttar Pradesh won the toss and elected to bat.

7–10 November
Scorecard

| Tamil Nadu | v | Madhya Pradesh (H) |
| 532/8d (180 overs); Subramaniam Badrinath 248 (448); Rameez Khan 2/78 (28 overs) | | 269 (100.4 overs); Devendra Bundela 95* (213); Aushik Srinivas 4/40 (32.4 overs) |
| | | 196/3 (f/o) (57 overs); Mohnish Mishra 66* (102); Aswin Crist 1/28 (8 overs) |

Match drawn
Holkar Cricket Stadium, Indore
Umpires: Rohan Pandit and Pashchim Pathak

- Madhya Pradesh won the toss and elected to field.

7–10 November
Scorecard

| Saurashtra | v | Railways (H) |
| 165 (75.4 overs); Jaydev Shah 45 (114); Anureet Singh 5/52 (27.4 overs) | | 175 (70.1 overs); Mahesh Rawat 62 (105); Jaydev Unadkat 5/53 (27.1 overs) |
| 217/3d (115 overs); Bhushan Chauhan 106* (330); Anureet Singh 2/36 (31 overs) | | 9/0 (18 overs); Shivakant Shukla 6* (57) |

Match drawn
Jamia Millia Islamia University Ground, Delhi
Umpires: Jayaraman Madanagopal and Shavir Tarapore

- Railways won the toss and elected to field.

7–10 November
Scorecard

| Rajasthan (H) | v | Bengal |
| 244 (98.3 overs); Vineet Saxena119* (297); Ashok Dinda 4/58 (28 overs) | | 326 (114.1 overs); Wriddhiman Saha 78 (160); Aniket Choudhary 5/93 (31 overs) |
| 257/5d (106 overs); Robin Bist 75 (224); Saurasish Lahiri 2/49 (19 overs) | | 25/1 (11 overs); Rohan Banerjee 12* (36); Ashok Menaria 1/10 (6 overs) |

Match drawn
Sawai Mansingh Stadium, Jaipur
Umpires: Belur Ravi and Krishnaraj Srinath

- Bengal won the toss and elected to field.

14–17 November
Scorecard

| Baroda (H) | v | Railways |
| 176 (69 overs); Aditya Waghmode 33 (112); Ranjitkumar Mali 8/48 (25 overs) | | 441/8d (172 overs); Arindam Ghosh 208* (380); Gagandeep Singh 3/94 (39 overs) |
| 217 (63.3 overs); Saurabh Wakaskar 59 (115); Krishnakant Upadhyay 4/63 (17.3 overs) |

Railways won by an innings and 48 runs
Moti Bagh Stadium, Vadodara
Umpires: Puttarangaiah Jayapal and Saiyed Khalid

- Railways won the toss and elected to field.

14–17 November
Scorecard

| Madhya Pradesh (H) | v | Bengal |
| 431 (135.5 overs); Naman Ojha 115 (254); Anustup Majumdar 3/42 (9.5 overs) | | 263 (98.1 overs); Arindam Das 104 (232); Jalaj Saxena 6/53 (17.1 overs) |
| | | 308/5 (f/o) (102 overs); Wriddhiman Saha 69 (95); Jalaj Saxena 4/117 (30 overs) |

Match drawn
Eden Gardens, Kolkata
Umpires: Rajesh Deshpande and Piyush Khakhar

- Madhya Pradesh won the toss and elected to bat.

14–17 November
Scorecard

| Saurashtra (H) | v | Uttar Pradesh |
| 632/7d (189.5 overs); Aarpit Vasavada 205 (321); Piyush Chawla 3/165 (51.5 overs) | | 353 (128.5 overs); Parvinder Singh 110 (248); Abhishek Bhat 4/49 (16 overs) |
| 51/0 (23 overs); Bhushan Chauhan 34* (72) |

Match drawn
Saurashtra Cricket Association Stadium, Rajkot
Umpires: Ammanabrole Nand Kishore and Ravi Subramanian

- Saurashtra won the toss and elected to bat.

14–17 November
Scorecard

| Services (H) | v | Rajasthan |
| 325 (105.2 overs); Rajat Paliwal 108* (188); Pankaj Singh 5/98 (30 overs) | | 424 (176.5 overs); Robin Bist 134 (378); Koteswar Rao 4/99 (55.5 overs) |
| 172/3 (60 overs); Nakul Verma 101* (188); Pankaj Singh 2/23 (9 overs) |

Match drawn
Palam A Ground, Model Sports Complex, Delhi
Umpires: S. Shankar and Suresh Shastri

- Rajasthan won the toss and elected to field.

21–24 November
Scorecard

| Bengal (H) | v | Saurashtra |
| 303 (75.2 overs); Laxmi Ratan Shukla 155 (163); Chirag Jani 3/62 (17 overs) | | 225 (79.3 overs); Cheteshwar Pujara 102 (146); Ashok Dinda 4/65 (23.3 overs) |
| 194 (82.5 overs); Anustup Majumdar 69 (156); Abhishek Bhat 6/47 (20.5 overs) | | 189/4 (72 overs); Jaydev Shah 104* (162); Sourav Sarkar 2/47 (21 overs) |

Match drawn
Eden Gardens, Kolkata
Umpires: Krishnaraj Srinath and Ravi Subramanian

- Saurashtra won the toss and elected to field.

21–24 November
Scorecard

| Railways | v | Rajasthan (H) |
| 283 (99.1 overs); Nitin Bhille 60 (177); Pankaj Singh 4/96 (32 overs) | | 178 (84.1 overs); Vineet Saxena 73 (210); Ranjitkumar Mali 3/36 (25.1 overs) |
| 150 (62.5 overs); Nitin Bhille 50* (170); Deepak Chahar 3/33 (13 overs) | | 136 (56.3 overs); Siddharth Saraf 39 (121); Anureet Singh 5/52 (23.3 overs) |

Railways won by 119 runs
Sawai Mansingh Stadium, Jaipur
Umpires: Piyush Khakhar and Ammanabrole Nand Kishore

- Rajasthan won the toss and elected to field.

21–24 November
Scorecard

| Madhya Pradesh | v | Services (H) |
| 239 (91.5 overs); Naman Ojha 63 (104); Suraj Yadav 4/63 (28 overs) | | 391 (122.3 overs); Yashpal Singh 142 (270); Jatin Saxena 4/47 (16 overs) |
| 385/7 (128 overs); Naman Ojha 211 (345); Koteswar Rao 3/82 (34 overs) |

Match drawn
Palam A Ground, Model Sports Complex, Delhi
Umpires: Pashchim Pathak and Shavir Tarapore

- Madhya Pradesh won the toss and elected to bat.

21–24 November
Scorecard

| Tamil Nadu | v | Uttar Pradesh (H) |
| 297 (107 overs); Ramaswamy Prasanna 118 (254); Imtiaz Ahmed 4/79 (29 overs) | | 500/9d (183 overs); Piyush Chawla 153 (279); Aushik Srinivas 4/168 (58 overs) |
| 128/2 (48 overs); Abhinav Mukund 56* (149); Piyush Chawla 2/17 (11 overs) |

Match drawn
Bhamashah Stadium, Meerut
Umpires: Umesh Dubey and Amiesh Saheba

- Tamil Nadu won the toss and elected to bat.

28–30 November
Scorecard

| Baroda (H) | v | Madhya Pradesh |
| 152 (55.2 overs); Abhimanyu Chauhan 58* (100); Jalaj Saxena 6/42 (21.2 overs) | | 60 (27.2 overs); Naman Ojha 17 (32); Ketul Patel 4/9 (9 overs) |
| 244 (65.5 overs); Yusuf Pathan 104* (101); Jalaj Saxena 7/82 (23.5 overs) | | 90 (44.4 overs); Rameez Khan 18 (39); Bhargav Bhatt 5/37 (19.4 overs) |

Baroda won by 246 runs
Moti Bagh Stadium, Vadodara
Umpires: Subrat Das and Puttarangaiah Jayapal

- Baroda won the toss and elected to bat.

28 November – 1 December
Scorecard

| Uttar Pradesh | v | Rajasthan (H) |
| 226 (85.3 overs); Parvinder Singh 46 (126); Aniket Choudhary 4/45 (21.5 overs) | | 185 (72.5 overs); Siddharth Saraf 56 (191); Amit Mishra 7/59 (22 overs) |
| 319/5d (93 overs); Prashant Gupta 144 (240); Aniket Choudhary 3/48 (23 overs) | | 253/6 (93 overs); Chetan Bist 61* (102); Imtiyaz Ahmed 3/58 (21 overs) |

Match drawn
Sawai Mansingh Stadium, Jaipur
Umpires: Piyush Khakhar and CK Nandan

- Rajasthan won the toss and elected to field

28 November – 1 December
Scorecard

| Bengal | v | Services (H) |
| 431 (166.2 overs); Arindam Das 165 (306); Koteswar Rao 4/123 (49 overs) | | 304 (120.5 overs); Vishnu Tiwari 71 (150); Sourashish Lahiri 3/69 (24.5 overs) |
| 126/3 (54 overs); Subhomoy Das 54 (120); Irfan Khan 1/10 (4 overs) |

Match drawn
Palam A Ground, Model Sports Complex, Delhi
Umpires: R. Sundar and Shavir Tarapore

- Services won the toss and elected to field

28 November – 1 December
Scorecard

| Tamil Nadu (H) | v | Saurashtra |
| 565 (158.2 overs); Abhinav Mukund 240 (437); Jaydev Unadkat 4/99 (31.4 overs) | | 581/6 (161.4 overs); Cheteshwar Pujara 269 (461); Baba Aparajith 2/71 (22.4 overs) |

Match drawn
M. A. Chidambaram Stadium, Chepauk, Chennai
Umpires: Sanjeev Dua and Tapan Sharma

- Saurasthra won the toss and elected to field

6–9 December
Scorecard

| Madhya Pradesh (H) | v | Rajasthan |
| 115 (50 overs); Jalaj Saxena 39 (60); Pankaj Singh 5/30 (19 overs) | | 282 (81.3 overs); Robin Bist 84* (166); Ishwar Pandey 4/92 (30 overs) |
| 314 (89.3 overs); Naman Ojha 137 (204); Rituraj Singh 4/74 (23.3 overs) | | 150/3 (32.4 overs); Robin Bist 63* (88); Ishwar Pandey 2/52 (12 overs) |

Rajasthan won by 7 wickets
Captain Roop Singh Stadium, Gwalior
Umpires: Rajesh Deshpande and Pashchim Pathak

- Rajasthan won the toss and elected to field.

6–9 December
Scorecard

| Railways (H) | v | Bengal |
| 306 (125.3 overs); Arindam Ghosh 88 (222); Shib Paul 3/47 (30 overs) | | 270 (133.5 overs); Laxmi Shukla 95* (143); Anureet Singh 5/97 (45 overs) |
| 193/2 (80 overs); Nitin Bhille 100* (199); Ashok Dinda 1/37 (16 overs) |

Match drawn
Jamia Millia Islamia University Ground, Delhi
Umpires: Puttarangaiah Jayapal and Milind Pathak

- Bengal won the toss and elected to field.

6–9 December
Scorecard

| Baroda | v | Tamil Nadu (H) |
| 162 (83.5 overs); Dhiren Mistry 68 (154); Rahil Shah 4/49 (26 overs) | | 233 (94.4 overs); Dinesh Karthik 92 (150); Yusuf Pathan 6/84 (33.4 overs) |
| 129 (75.2 overs); Dhiren Mistry 64 (230); Malolan Rangarajan 6/46 (29 overs) | | 59/1 (14.5 overs); Arun Karthik 33 (40); Ketul Patel 1/16 (3.5 overs) |

Tamil Nadu won by 9 wickets
MA Chidambaram Stadium, Chepauk, Chennai
Umpires: Navdeep Singh and Virender Sharma

- Baroda won the toss and elected to bat.

6–9 December
Scorecard

| Services | v | Uttar Pradesh (H) |
| 164 (45.2 overs); Anshul Gupta 33 (63); RP Singh 3/38 (13 overs) | | 369 (120.2 overs); Eklavya Dwivedi 131 (195); Pratik Desai 3/51 (12 overs) |
| 191 (57.5 overs); Rajat Paliwal 95 (127); Imtiaz Ahmed 3/16 (10 overs) |

Uttar Pradesh won by an innings and 14 runs
Mohan Meakins Cricket Stadium, Ghaziabad
Umpires: Jayaraman Madanagopal and Ravi Subramanian

- Uttar Pradesh won the toss and elected to field.

14–17 December
Scorecard

| Services | v | Baroda (H) |
| 191 (65 overs); Soumya Swain 62 (154); Munaf Patel 4/38 (13 overs) | | 369 (106.2 overs); Dhiren Mistry 118 (227); Rahul Kanojia 3/76 (19 overs) |
| 31 (20 overs); Vishnu Tiwari 14 (20); Munaf Patel 6/13 (10 overs) |

Baroda won by an innings and 147 runs
Reliance Stadium, Vadodara
Umpires: Puttarangaiah Jayapal and Chettithody Shamsuddin

- Baroda won the toss and elected to field.

14–17 December
Scorecard

| Uttar Pradesh | v | Bengal (H) |
| 212 (70.1 overs); Prashant Gupta 53 (86); Sourav Sarkar 4/51 (18.1 overs) | | 284 (71 overs); Laxmi Ratan Shukla 117 (119); RP Singh 5/77 (22 overs) |
| 140 (48.4 overs); Ali Murtaza 43* (57); Ashok Dinda 7/82 (24.4 overs) | | 70/2 (18.1 overs); Abhimanyu Easwaran 27 (48); Ali Murtaza 1/18 (3 overs) |

Bengal won by 8 wickets
Eden Gardens, Kolkata
Umpires: Anil Dandekar and Vineet Kulkarni

- Bengal won the toss and elected to field.

14–17 December
Scorecard

| Madhya Pradesh (H) | v | Saurashtra |
| 619/8d (154 overs); Jalaj Saxena 194 (302); Kamlesh Makvana 2/101 (22 overs) | | 492 (144.1 overs); Sagar Jogiyani 190 (345); Ishwar Pandey 5/144 (38 overs) |
| 119/2 (34 overs); Jalaj Saxena 56* (91) |

Match drawn
Holkar Cricket Stadium, Indore
Umpires: Anil Chaudhary and Navdeep Singh

- Saurashtra won the toss and elected to field.

14–17 December
Scorecard

| Tamil Nadu | v | Railways (H) |
| 246 (101 overs); Ramaswamy Prasanna 117 (254); Anureet Singh 5/67 (35 overs) | | 169 (75 overs); Karn Sharma 51 (105); Lakshmipathy Balaji 4/31 (19 overs) |
| 28/2 (25 overs); Arun Karthik 10* (73); Anureet Singh 1/7 (11 overs) |

Match drawn
Jamia Millia Islamia University Ground, Delhi
Umpires: Rajesh Deshpande and Nikhil Patwardhan

- Railways won the toss and elected to field.

22–25 December
Scorecard

| Railways | v | Services |
| 107 (53.5 overs); Nitin Bhille 21 (128); Nishan Singh 5/21 (13.5 overs) | | 153 (66.1 overs); Yashpal Singh 67 (139); Anureet Singh 4/44 (19.1 overs) |
| 282/7d (91 overs); Mahesh Rawat 92* (143); Suraj Yadav 3/67 (30 overs) | | 200 (76.5 overs); Pratik Desai 100 (180); Karn Sharma 5/50 (25 overs) |

Railways won by 36 runs
Jamia Millia Islamia University Ground, Delhi
Umpires: Abhijit Deshmukh and Amiesh Saheba

- Services won the toss and elected to field.

22–25 December
Scorecard

| Baroda | v | Saurashtra (H) |
| 400 (104.4 overs); Saurabh Wakaskar 128 (193); Jaydev Unadkat 3/58 (17.4 overs) | | 311 (101.5 overs); Sheldon Jackson 74 (106); Utkarsh Patel 5/70 (30 overs) |
| 265/9d (67.4 overs); Saurabh Wakaskar 69 (98); Jaydev Unadkat 4/61 (14 overs) | | 115 (79.3 overs); Chirag Pathak 36 (133); Yusuf Pathan 6/40 (27 overs) |

Baroda won by 239 runs
Saurashtra Cricket Association Stadium, Rajkot
Umpires: Krishnamachari Bharatan and Shavir Tarapore

- Baroda won the toss and elected to bat.

22–25 December
Scorecard

| Tamil Nadu (H) | v | Rajasthan |
| 318 (123.1 overs); Ramaswamy Prasanna 73 (178); Pankaj Singh 5/54 (26 overs) | | 438 (181 overs); Vineet Saxena 83 (263); Rahil Shah 3/94 (45 overs) |
| 76/0 (28 overs); Arun Karthik 37* (70) |

Match drawn
MA Chidambaram Stadium, Chepauk, Chennai
Umpires: Rajesh Deshpande and Piyush Khakhar

- Tamil Nadu won the toss and elected to bat.

22–25 December
Scorecard

| Uttar Pradesh (H) | v | Madhya Pradesh |
| 250 (73.1 overs); Eklavya Dwivedi 80* (152); Jalaj Saxena 3/44 (11.1 overs) | | 115 (47.1 overs); Anand Bais 28 (45); Ankit Rajpoot 5/37 (17.1 overs) |
| 178/5d (52.2 overs); Suresh Raina 82 (134); Ishwar Pandey 2/32 (14.2 overs) | | 140/7 (64 overs); Salman Baig 31* (85); Amit Mishra 3/17 (16 overs) |

Match drawn
Green Park, Kanpur
Umpires: Krishnamachari Srinivasan and Ravi Subramanian

- Madhya Pradesh won the toss and elected to field.

30 December – 2 January
Scorecard

| Baroda | v | Rajasthan (H) |
| 236 (69.1 overs); Aditya Waghmode 114 (216); Deepak Chahar 5/58 (17.1 overs) | | 333 (104.4 overs); Suryaprakash Suwalka 74 (97); Gagandeep Singh 7/109 (35.4 overs) |
| 167 (48.2 overs); Irfan Pathan 84 (118); Deepak Chahar 4/40 (15.2 overs) | | 74/4 (13.4 overs); Siddharth Saraf 29 (34); Gagandeep Singh 3/29 (6.4 overs) |

Rajasthan won by 6 wickets
Sawai Mansingh Stadium, Jaipur
Umpires: Subrat Das and Saiyed Khalid

- Rajasthan won the toss and elected to field.

30 December – 2 January
Scorecard

| Services | v | Saurashtra (H) |
| 72 (21.4 overs); Shadab Nazar 19 (17); Kamlesh Makvana 6/17 (6.4 overs) | | 177 (66.5 overs); Sheldon Jackson 52 (122); Yashpal Singh 5/41 (21 overs) |
| 135 (43.1 overs); Anshul Gupta 85 (122); Nayan Doshi 4/31 (12.1 overs) | | 33/1 (6.2 overs); Sagar Jogiyani 15* (16); Koteswar Rao 1/6 (3 overs) |

Saurashtra won by 9 wickets
Saurashtra Cricket Association Stadium, Rajkot
Umpires: CK Nandan and R. Sundar

- Services won the toss and elected to bat.

30 December – 2 January
Scorecard

| Bengal | v | Tamil Nadu (H) |
| 130 (52 overs); Subhomoy Das 36 (49); Malolan Rangarajan 6/30 (16 overs) | | 85 (42.3 overs); Dinesh Karthik 28 (54); Arnab Nandi 4/9 (6 overs) |
| 139 (40.3 overs); Laxmi Ratan Shukla 46 (25); Rahil Shah 6/64 (18 overs) | | 180 (81.5 overs); Dinesh Karthik 62 (148); Saurasish Lahiri 7/62 (33 overs) |

Bengal won by 4 runs
MA Chidambaram Stadium, Chepauk, Chennai
Umpires: Anil Chaudhary and Ulhas Gandhe

- Bengal won the toss and elected to bat.

30 December – 2 January
Scorecard

| Railways | v | Uttar Pradesh (H) |
| 518/9d (167 overs); Mahesh Rawat 188 (279); Ali Murtaza 4/112 (38 overs) | | 231/3 (77 overs); Tanmay Srivastava 103 (210); Shailender Gehlot 1/22 (11 overs) |

Match drawn
Dr. Akhilesh Das Stadium, Lucknow
Umpires: Pashchim Pathak and Virender Sharma

- Railways won the toss and elected to bat.

== Group C ==
=== Points table ===
| Team | Pld | W | L | D | A | WI | FI | Pts | Q |
|---|---|---|---|---|---|---|---|---|---|
| Maharashtra | 8 | 4 | 0 | 4 | 0 | 1 | 3 | 35 | 1.684 |
| Jammu and Kashmir | 8 | 4 | 2 | 2 | 0 | 0 | 1 | 28 | 1.006 |
| Goa | 8 | 4 | 1 | 3 | 0 | 1 | 0 | 28 | 1.005 |
| Himachal Pradesh | 8 | 3 | 3 | 2 | 0 | 2 | 1 | 24 | 1.164 |
| Kerala | 8 | 2 | 2 | 4 | 0 | 0 | 3 | 22 | 0.949 |
| Hyderabad | 8 | 1 | 0 | 7 | 0 | 0 | 3 | 19 | 1.089 |
| Andhra | 8 | 1 | 2 | 5 | 0 | 1 | 1 | 14 | 1.029 |
| Assam | 8 | 1 | 4 | 3 | 0 | 1 | 2 | 14 | 0.805 |
| Tripura | 8 | 0 | 6 | 2 | 0 | 0 | 0 | 2 | 0.573 |

Top two teams advance to knockout stage. and move to Groups A and B for 2014–15 Ranji Trophy

=== Fixtures ===
27–30 October
Scorecard

| Assam (H) | v | Kerala |
| 323 (139.4 overs); Niraj Patel 82 (188); Vinoop Manoharan 3/49 (38 overs) | | 362 (120.4 overs); Sanju Samson 211 (338); Syed Mohammed 4/87 (37.4 overs) |
| 217/9 (96 overs); Tarjinder Singh 46 (130); Chovvakkaran Shahid 3/43 (25 overs) |

Match drawn
Dr. Bhupen Hazarika Cricket Stadium, Guwahati
Umpires: Milind Pathak and Amardeep Pathania

- Kerala won the toss and elected to field.

27–30 October
Scorecard

| Himachal Pradesh (H) | v | Goa |
| 558/5d (116.4 overs); Paras Dogra 209* (345); Shadab Jakati 2/141 (30.4 overs) | | 243 (80.3 overs); Ravikant Shukla 79 (143); Rishi Dhawan 5/68 (25 overs) |
| | | 282/2 (f/o) (93 overs); Amogh Sunil Desai 126 (243); Abhinav Bali 1/11 (8 overs) |

Match drawn
Himachal Pradesh Cricket Association Stadium, Dharmasala
Umpires: Anil Dandekar and Rohan Pandit

- Goa won the toss and elected to field.

27–30 October
Scorecard

| Hyderabad (H) | v | Andhra |
| 221 (76 overs); Hanuma Vihari 75 (165); Syed Shahabuddin 4/45 (20 overs) | | 185 (84.3 overs); Prasanth Kumar 47 (154); Ashish Reddy 3/49 (18 overs) |
| 251/6d (98 overs); Hanuma Vihari 68* (222); Marripuri Suresh 3/32 (10 overs) | | 51/0 (19 overs); Srikar Bharat 30* (61) |

Match drawn
Rajiv Gandhi International Stadium, Hyderabad
Umpires: Nitin Menon and Pashchim Pathak

- Andhra won the toss and elected to field.

27–30 October
Scorecard

| Tripura | v | Maharashtra (H) |
| 304 (109.5 overs); Yogesh Takawale 125 (241); Sachin Chaudhari 4/44 (23.5 overs) | | 460/3d (126 overs); Vijay Zol 200* (324); Abbas Ali 1/23 (5 overs) |
| 218 (82.3 overs); Yogesh Takawale 109* (203); Sachin Chaudhari 7/52 (19.3 overs) | | 63/1 (8.4 overs); Kedar Jadhav 48* (25); Rana Dutta 1/18 (3 overs) |

Maharashtra won by 9 wickets
Maharashtra Cricket Association Stadium, Pune
Umpires: K. N. Ananthapadmanabhan and S. Shankar

- Maharashtra won the toss and elected to field.

7–10 November
Scorecard

| Assam (H) | v | Hyderabad |
| 501/9d (197 overs); Gokul Sharma 161* (332); Amol Shinde 3/143 (75 overs) | | 370 (132.2 overs); Tirumalasetti Suman 126 (170); Tarjinder Singh 2/35 (11 overs) |
| 20/1 (13 overs); Sibsankar Roy 9* (42) |

Match drawn
Dr. Bhupen Hazarika Cricket Stadium, Guwahati
Umpires: Anil Dandekar and Tapan Sharma

- Hyderabad won the toss and elected to field.

7–10 November
Scorecard

| Goa | v | Jammu and Kashmir (H) |
| 317 (97.1 overs); Keenan Vaz 99 (141); Ram Dayal 5/85 (22.1 overs) | | 302 (94 overs); Adil Rishi 80 (126); Shadab Jakati 5/79 (38 overs) |
| 246 (73.5 overs); Keenan Vaz 59 (100); Parvez Rasool 4/65 (21 overs) |

Match 22
Sher-i-Kashmir Stadium, Srinagar
Umpires: Krishnamachari Bharatan and Amiesh Saheba

- Goa won the toss and elected to bat.

7–10 November
Scorecard

| Kerala (H) | v | Andhra |
| 486 (163 overs); Sanju Samson 115 (281); Paidikalva Vijaykumar 3/66 (31 overs) | | 431 (153.1 overs); Bodapati Sumanth 90 (216); Vinoop Manoharan 4/82 (22.1 overs) |
| 89/3 (24 overs); Sanju Samson 51* (73); Amol Muzumdar 1/11 (2 overs) |

Match drawn
Conor Vayal Stadium, Tellicherry, Kannur
Umpires: Nitin Menon and Amardeep Pathania

- Kerala won the toss and elected to bat.

7–9 November
Scorecard

| Tripura (H) | v | Himachal Pradesh |
| 141 (71.3 overs); Abhijit Dey 66 (194); Vikramjeet Malik 5/37 (21 overs) | | 186 (61.5 overs); Rishi Dhawan 67 (95); Viki Saha 5/53 (17.5 overs) |
| 188 (77.2 overs); KB Pawan 86 (183); Bipul Sharma 4/30 (16.2 overs) | | 144/2 (35.2 overs); Prashant Chopra 84* (104); Manisankar Murasingh 1/21 (9 overs) |

Himachal Pradesh won by 8 wickets
Maharaja Bir Bikram College Stadium, Agartala
Umpires: Abhijit Deshmukh and Nikhil Patwardhan

- Himachal Pradesh won the toss and elected to field.

14–17 November
Scorecard

| Andhra (H) | v | Assam |
| 297 (120 overs); Bodapati Sumanth 75 (205); Abu Ahmed 5/62 (31 overs) | | 432 (167 overs); Dheeraj Jadhav 158 (356); Duvvarapu Shivkumar 3/63 (30 overs) |
| 176/1 (50 overs); Srikar Bharat 90 (145); Syed Mohammed 1/31 (12 overs) |

Match drawn
Rural Development Trust Stadium, Anantapur
Umpires: Sanjeev Dua and Ulhas Gandhe

- Assam won the toss and elected to field.

14–16 November
Scorecard

| Himachal Pradesh (H) | v | Jammu and Kashmir |
| 178 (54.1 overs); Parvez Rasool 97 (101); Rishi Dhawan 4/70 (23 overs) | | 458 (117 overs); Paras Dogra 96 (185); Ram Dayal 4/97 (34 overs) |
| 88 (26.4 overs); Manik Gupta 18 (17); Rishi Dhawan 5/51 (12 overs) |

Himachal Pradesh won by an innings and 192 runs
Himachal Pradesh Cricket Association Stadium, Dharmasala
Umpires: R. Sundar and Shavir Tarapore

- Himachal Pradesh won the toss and elected to field.

14–17 November
Scorecard

| Maharashtra (H) | v | Hyderabad |
| 616/9d (163.4 overs); Kedar Jadhav 204 (267); Ravi Kiran 4/116 (34.4 overs) | | 528/7 (188 overs); Syed Quadri 113* (297); Akshay Darekar 3/149 (59 overs) |

Match drawn
Rajiv Gandhi International Cricket Stadium, Hyderabad
Umpires: Nitin Pandit and Virender Sharma

- Maharashtra won the toss and elected to bat.

14–16 November
Scorecard

| Tripura | v | Kerala (H) |
| 140 (67 overs); Yogesh Takawale 45 (125); Sandeep Warrier 4/27 (16 overs) | | 297 (91.1 overs); Rohan Prem 80 (127); Rana Dutta 4/38 (14 overs) |
| 202 (84.3 overs); Yogesh Takawale 81 (109); Chovvakkaran Shahid 7/45 (29.3 overs) | | 46/1 (8.4 overs); Nikhilesh Surendran 30 (33); Abhijit Dey 1/4 (0.4 overs) |

Kerala won by 9 wickets
Conor Vayal Stadium, Tellicherry, Kannur
Umpires: Umesh Dubey and Navdeep Singh

- Tripura won the toss and elected to bat.

21–24 November
Scorecard

| Jammu and Kashmir | v | Andhra (H) |
| 225 (108.3 overs); Bandeep Singh 69 (256); Paidikalva Vijaykumar 3/63 (33 overs) | | 205 (74 overs); Srikar Bharat 39 (88); Mohammed Mudhasir 4/49 (17 overs) |
| 121 (41.2 overs); Adil Rishi 25 (37); Paidikalva Vijaykumar 5/52 (21 overs) | | 124 (44.4 overs); Marripuri Suresh 50 (104); Mohammed Mudhasir 3/19 (14 overs) |

Jammu and Kashmir won by 17 runs
Rural Development Trust Stadium, Anantapur
Umpires: Ravi Deshmukh and Milind Pathak

- Andhra won the toss and elected to field.

21–24 November
Scorecard

| Hyderabad | v | Himachal Pradesh (H) |
| 237 (82.3 overs); Tirumalasetti Suman 65 (92); Rishi Dhawan 5/75 (28 overs) | | 296 (73.1 overs); Bipul Sharma 91 (110); Alfred Absolem 4/88 (21 overs) |
| 355/8d (113.5 overs); Syed Quadri 101* (154); Akshay Chauhan 5/98 (26 overs) | | 111 (35.5 overs); Paras Dogra 37 (84); Ravi Kiran 4/42 (8.5 overs) |

Hyderabad won by 185 runs
Himachal Pradesh Cricket Association Stadium, Dharmasala
Umpires: Amardeep Pathania and Suresh Shastri

- Himachal Pradesh won the toss and elected to field.

21–24 November
Scorecard

| Maharashtra (H) | v | Goa |
| 635 (153.4 overs); Harshad Khadiwale 262 (396); Amit Yadav 7/155 (45.4 overs) | | 439 (162.3 overs); Harshad Hanumant Gadekar 95 (334); Domnic Joseph 4/82 (32 overs) |
| 109/3 (26 overs); Kedar Jadhav 25* (47); Amit Yadav 1/17 (7 overs) |

Match drawn
Maharashtra Cricket Association Stadium, Pune
Umpires: Krishnamachari Bharatan and Nitin Menon

- Goa won the toss and elected to field.

21–24 November
Scorecard

| Tripura (H) | v | Assam |
| 136 (55 overs); Abhijit Dey 54 (131); Arup Das 4/34 (16 overs) | | 525/5d (141 overs); Dheeraj Jadhav 194 (301); Rana Dutta 2/91 (28 overs) |
| 334 (120.5 overs); Samrat Singha 79 (247); Abu Nechim 4/78 (26.5 overs) |

Assam won by an innings and 55 runs
Maharaja Bir Bikram College Stadium, Agartala
Umpires: Sanjeev Dua and Ulhas Gandhe

- Assam won the toss and elected to field.

28 November – 1 December
Scorecard

| Andhra (H) | v | Maharashtra |
| 317 (110.1 overs); Prasanth Kumar 86 (188); Domnic Joseph 3/61 (22.5 overs) | | 440 (127.5 overs); Kedar Jadhav 173 (214); Paidikalva Vijaykumar 6/83 (33.5 overs) |
| 237/7 (90 overs); Gonnabattula Chiranjeevi 85 (209); Anupam Sanklecha 3/52 (25 overs) |

Match drawn
YS Raja Reddy Stadium, Cuddapah
Umpires: Nitin Pandit and Amardeep Pathania

- Maharashtra won the toss and elected to field

28 November – 1 December
Scorecard

| Goa (H) | v | Tripura |
| 252 (97.4 overs); Amogh Sunil Desai 102 (205); Rana Dutta 5/55 (24.4 overs) | | 174 (68.3 overs); Abbas Ali 60 (126); Harshad Hanumant Gadekar 3/28 (15 overs) |
| 177 (70.2 overs); Keenan Vaz 32 (45); Kaushal Acharjee 2/14 (8 overs) | | 206 (87.4 overs); KB Pawan 70 (144); Harshad Hanumant Gadekar 5/49 (18.4 overs) |

Goa won by 49 runs
Goa Cricket Association Academy Ground, Porvorim
Umpires: Virender Sharma and Suresh Shastri

- Tripura won the toss and elected to field

28–30 November
Scorecard

| Assam | v | Himachal Pradesh (H) |
| 81 (32.5 overs); Syed Mohammed 17 (17); Rishi Dhawan 5/29 (13 overs) | | 463/9d (104.3 overs); Bipul Sharma 102* (130); Abu Nechim 3/87 (22 overs) |
| 161 (53.5 overs); Dheeraj Jadhav 52 (125); Rishi Dhawan 5/58 (18.5 overs) |

Himachal Pradesh won by an innings and 221 runs
Himachal Pradesh Cricket Association Stadium, Dharmasala
Umpires: Saiyed Khalid and S. Shankar

- Himachal Pradesh won the toss and elected to field.

28 November – 1 December
Scorecard

| Jammu and Kashmir (H) | v | Kerala |
| 377 (113.2 overs); Ian Dev Singh 98 (125); Prasanth Parameswaran 4/52 (23 overs) | | 307 (114 overs); VA Jagadeesh 106 (218); Samiullah Beigh 4/76 (24 overs) |
| 337/2d (67.4 overs); Adil Rishi 160* (190); Perumparambath Anthaf 1/62 (10 overs) | | 129 (41.4 overs); Sachin Baby 38 (75); Mohammed Mudhasir 5/31 (9.4 overs) |

Jammu & Kashmir won by 278 runs
Gandhi Memorial Science College Ground, Jammu
Umpires: Abhijit Deshmukh and Nikhil Patwardhan

- Kerala won the toss and elected to field

6–9 December
Scorecard

| Assam (H) | v | Goa |
| 247 (105 overs); Syed Mohammed 101* (226); Harshad Hanumant Gadekar 5/33 (27 overs) | | 406/9d (143 overs); Amogh Sunil Desai 97 (202); Abu Nechim 3/50 (23 overs) |
| 208 (79.3 overs); Syed Mohammed 67 (154); Amit Yadav 7/68 (31 overs) | | 50/0 (9.5 overs); Swapnil Asnodkar 33* (31) |

Goa won by 10 wickets
Dr. Bhupen Hazarika Cricket Stadium, Guwahati
Umpires: Umesh Dubey and Nitin Pandit

- Goa won the toss and elected to field.

6–9 December
Scorecard

| Tripura | v | Hyderabad (H) |
| 650/8d (190.3 overs); Yogesh Takawale 212 (400); Ravi Kiran 2/110 (32.3 overs) | | 566/8 (171 overs); Dwaraka Ravi Teja 175 (325); Tushar Saha 5/150 (57 overs) |

Match drawn
Rajiv Gandhi International Stadium, Uppal, Hyderabad
Umpires: Anil Dandekar and Ulhas Gandhe

- Tripura won the toss and elected to bat.

6–9 December
Scorecard

| Kerala (H) | v | Himachal Pradesh |
| 214 (56.1 overs); Vinoop Manoharan 71 (105); Vishal Bhatia 5/63 (19 overs) | | 174 (40.3 overs); Bipul Sharma 53 (83); Padmanabhan Prasanth 7/54 (16.3 overs) |
| 155 (44.3 overs); Sachin Baby 43 (61); Bipul Sharma 4/32 (13 overs) | | 134 (39.2 overs); Prashant Chopra 36 (45); Vinoop Manoharan 5/43 (12 overs) |

Kerala won by 61 runs
Conor Vayal Stadium, Tellicherry, Kannur
Umpires: Krishnamachari Bharatan and Piyush Khakhar

- Kerala won the toss and elected to bat.

6–9 December
Scorecard

| Jammu and Kashmir | v | Maharashtra (H) |
| 85 (29.5 overs); Ram Dayal 18 (31); Samad Fallah 4/32 (11.5 overs) | | 401/9d (109 overs); Harshad Khadiwale 87 (185); Mohammed Mudhasir 5/87 (26 overs) |
| 439 (153.5 overs); Obaid Haroon 94 (172); Shrikant Mundhe 5/123 (39 overs) | | 126/1 (26.2 overs); Harshad Khadiwale 74* (74); Waseem Raza 1/15 (5 overs) |

Maharashtra won by 9 wickets
Maharashtra Cricket Association Stadium, Pune
Umpires: Saiyed Khalid and Nikhil Patwardhan

- Maharashtra won the toss and elected to field.

14–17 December
Scorecard

| Andhra (H) | v | Himachal Pradesh |
| 417 (162.2 overs); Prasanth Kumar 199 (422); Rishi Dhawan 5/125 (39.2 overs) | | 305 (80.4 overs); Nikhil Gangta 115 (162); Paidikalva Vijaykumar 4/90 (24 overs) |
| 232/3d (68 overs); Murumulla Sriram 101* (171); Ankush Bedi 1/37 (10 overs) | | 154/5 (39 overs); Paras Dogra 64 (100); Gonnabattula Chiranjeevi 3/14 (5 overs) |

Match drawn
Dr. Y.S. Rajasekhara Reddy ACA-VDCA Cricket Stadium, Visakhapatnam
Umpires: Umesh Dubey and Sanjay Hazare

- Andhra won the toss and elected to bat.

14–17 December
Scorecard

| Hyderabad | v | Goa (H) |
| 514/6d (171 overs); Hanuma Vihari 201* (378); Buddhadev Mangaldas 2/77 (32 overs) | | 465 (164.4 overs); Rohit Asnodkar 103 (227); Amol Shinde 3/92 (38.4 overs) |
| 11/0 (5 overs); Akshath Reddy 10* (12) |

Match drawn
Goa Cricket Association Academy Ground, Porvorim
Umpires: Subrat Das and Virender Sharma

- Hyderabad won the toss and elected to bat.

14–17 December
Scorecard

| Assam | v | Jammu and Kashmir (H) |
| 263 (87.5 overs); Gokul Sharma 108 (203); Mohammed Mudhasir 5/71 (23.5 overs) | | 427 (129 overs); Ian Dev Singh 170 (272); Arup Das 5/79 (25 overs) |
| 195 (53.4 overs); Abu Nechim 50 (53); Samiullah Beigh 6/42 (12.4 overs) | | 32/1 (6.2 overs); Obaid Haroon 14* (19); Syed Mohammed 1/8 (1.2 overs) |

Jammu and Kashmir won by 9 wickets
Gandhi Memorial Science College Ground, Jammu
Umpires: Amardeep Pathania and R. Sundar

- Jammu & Kashmir won the toss and elected to field.

14–17 December
Scorecard

| Kerala (H) | v | Maharashtra |
| 151 (57 overs); Sachin Baby 30 (75); Akshay Darekar 4/54 (22 overs) | | 314 (109.2 overs); Harshad Khadiwale 97 (136); Vinoop Manoharan 4/60 (23.2 overs) |
| 432 (140.3 overs); Sachin Baby 96 (204); Chirag Khurana 4/105 (32 overs) | | 130/3 (41 overs); Chirag Khurana 43* (47); Prasanth Parameswaran 1/13 (7 overs) |

Match drawn
Conor Vayal Stadium, Tellicherry, Kannur
Umpires: Nitin Menon and Pashchim Pathak

- Kerala won the toss and elected to bat.

22–25 December
Scorecard

| Kerala | v | Goa (H) |
| 273 (83 overs); Vinoop Manoharan 87 (151); Buddhadev Mangaldas 3/66 (20 overs) | | 242 (91.2 overs); Sagun Kamat 96 (155); Nizar Niyas 6/82 (22 overs) |
| 147 (62.5 overs); Padmanabhan Prasanth 46 (112); Shadab Jakati 4/44 (22.5 overs) | | 183/7 (64 overs); Harshad Hanumant Gadekar 57* (102); Prasanth Parameswaran 2/23 (14 overs) |

Goa won by 3 wickets
Goa Cricket Association Academy Ground, Porvorim
Umpires: Anil Dandekar and Suresh Shastri

- Kerala won the toss and elected to bat.

22–25 December
Scorecard

| Hyderabad | v | Jammu and Kashmir (H) |
| 514/8d (118 overs); Dwaraka Ravi Teja 179 (258); Parvez Rasool 4/99 (25 overs) | | 299 (93.1 overs); Hardeep Singh 78 (175); Ravi Kiran 5/53 (18.1 overs) |
| | | 127/1 (42 overs); Obaid Haroon 52* (128); Amol Shinde 1/7 (3 overs) |

Match drawn
Gandhi Memorial Science College Ground, Jammu
Umpires: Sudhir Asnani and Rohan Pandit

- Jammu & Kashmir won the toss and elected to field.

22–25 December
Scorecard

| Himachal Pradesh | v | Maharashtra (H) |
| 228 (76.2 overs); Prashant Chopra 47 (62); Samad Fallah 3/48 (21 overs) | | 488/6d (145 overs); Ankit Bawne 138* (304); Vikramjeet Malik 2/71 (27 overs) |
| 319 (98.1 overs); Paras Dogra 62 (148); Anupam Sanklecha 3/70 (19.1 overs) | | 63/0 (13.1 overs); Rohit Motwani 33* (38) |

Maharashtra won by 10 wickets
Maharashtra Cricket Association Stadium, Pune
Umpires: Subrat Das and Ammanabrole Nand Kishore

- Maharashtra won the toss and elected to field.

22–25 December
Scorecard

| Tripura (H) | v | Andhra |
| 179 (68 overs); Tushar Saha 61 (126); Paidikalva Vijaykumar 5/40 (23 overs) | | 163 (56.3 overs); Bodapati Sumanth 55 (88); Rana Dutta 5/51 (17.3 overs) |
| 86 (39.4 overs); Manisankar Murasingh 21 (55); Duvvarapu Shivkumar 4/24 (12.4 overs) | | 104/0 (21.2 overs); Srikar Bharat 64* (70) |

Andhra won by 10 wickets
Maharaja Bir Bikram College Stadium, Agartala
Umpires: CK Nandan and R. Sundar

- Andhra won the toss and elected to field.

30 December – 2 January
Scorecard

| Maharashtra | v | Assam (H) |
| 361 (96.2 overs); Kedar Jadhav 128 (148); Arup Das 3/83 (25 overs) | | 152 (71.2 overs); Niraj Patel 40 (99); Akshay Darekar 6/53 (24.2 overs) |
| 134 (57.5 overs); Kedar Jadhav 34 (56); Syed Mohammed 7/50 (20.5 overs) | | 215 (72.4 overs); Dheeraj Jadhav 61 (193); Akshay Darekar 4/84 (23 overs) |

Maharashtra won by 128 runs
Dr. Bhupen Hazarika Cricket Stadium, Guwahati
Umpires: Navdeep Singh and Krishnamachari Srinivasan

- Assam won the toss and elected to field.

30 December – 2 January
Scorecard

| Andhra | v | Goa (H) |
| 148 (63.3 overs); Duvvarapu Shivkumar 48 (79); Amit Yadav 6/44 (20 overs) | | 267 (97.5 overs); Swapnil Asnodkar 80 (181); Bodavarapu Sudhakar 3/42 (21.5 overs) |
| 160 (72.3 overs); Murumulla Sriram 34 (138); Harshad Hanumant Gadekar 4/28 (15.3 overs) | | 43/2 (15 overs); Sagun Kamat 18* (17); Shaik Basha 1/11 (4 overs) |

Goa won by 8 wickets
Goa Cricket Association Academy Ground, Porvorim
Umpires: Sudhir Asnani and Nikhil Patwardhan

- Andhra won the toss and elected to bat.

30 December – 2 January
Scorecard

| Hyderabad (H) | v | Kerala |
| 201 (74.4 overs); Ashish Reddy 55 (65); Sandeep Warrier 5/38 (19 overs) | | 264 (83.4 overs); Padmanabhan Prasanth 106 (197); Ravi Kiran 4/81 (19 overs) |
| 429 (131.2 overs); Hanuma Vihari 145 (296); Nizar Niyas 3/97 (22 overs) | | 146/2 (47 overs); Nikhilesh Surendran 57 (70); Ravi Kiran 2/29 (9 overs) |

Match drawn
Rajiv Gandhi International Stadium, Uppal, Hyderabad
Umpires: Amiesh Saheba and Suresh Shastri

- Kerala won the toss and elected to field.

30 December – 2 January
Scorecard

| Tripura (H) | v | Jammu and Kashmir |
| 280 (95.1 overs); Yogesh Takawale 83 (153); Samiullah Beigh 5/80 (23 overs) | | 325 (77.4 overs); Parvez Rasool 83 (92); Tushar Saha 5/113 (24.4 overs) |
| 272 (103.5 overs); Abhijit Dey 63 (159); Parvez Rasool 7/87 (35.5 overs) | | 87/2 (25 overs); Bandeep Singh 37* (85); Manisankar Murasingh 1/12 (4 overs) |

Match drawn
Tripura Institute of Technology Ground, Agartala
Umpires: Puttarangaiah Jayapal and Milind Pathak

- Jammu and Kashmir won the toss and elected to field.

== Knockout stage ==
Quarterfinals
A3 | Mumbai | 402 & 129
C1 | Maharashtra | 280 & 252/2
B3 | Bengal | 317 & 267
B1 | Railways | 314 & 222
A1 | Karnataka | 349 & 204
B2 | Uttar Pradesh | 221/9d & 240
A2 | Punjab | 304 & 296
C2 | Jammu and Kashmir | 277 & 223

Semifinals
B3 | Bengal | 114 & 348
C1 | Maharashtra | 455 & 8/0
A2 | Punjab | 270
A1 | Karnataka (1st inns Lead) | 447/5

Final
C1 | Maharashtra | 305 & 366
A1 | Karnataka | 515 & 157/3

=== Quarter-finals ===
8–11 January
Scorecard

| Mumbai (H) | v | Maharashtra |
| 402 (116.3 overs); Suryakumar Yadav 120 (139); Samad Fallah 4/103 (35.3 overs) | | 280 (84.3 overs); Ankit Bawne 84 (113); Shardul Thakur 6/86 (19.3 overs) |
| 129 (38.1 overs); Suryakumar Yadav 33 (47); Anupam Sanklecha 4/57 (14 overs) | | 252/2 (65.1 overs); Kedar Jadhav * 120 (144); Zaheer Khan 2/51 (17 overs) |

Maharashtra won by 8 wickets
Wankhede Stadium, Mumbai
Umpires: Chettithody Shamshuddin and Dennis Smith (SA)

- Maharashtra won the toss and elected to field.

8–12 January
Scorecard

| Bengal (H) | v | Railways |
| 317 (101.5 overs); Sudip Chatterjee 96 (176); Anureet Singh 4/88 (32.2 overs) | | 314 (93.3 overs); Mahesh Rawat 119 (144); Ashok Dinda 6/105 (28.3 overs) |
| 267 (90.4 overs); Wriddhiman Saha 81 (200); Anureet Singh 5/72 (25.4 overs) | | 222 (83.3 overs); Murali Kartik 56 (102); Laxmi Ratan Shukla 3/45 (15 overs) |

Bengal won by 48 runs
Eden Gardens, Kolkata
Umpires: Pashchim Pathak and Suresh Shastri

- Railways won the toss and elected to field.

8–11 January
Scorecard

| Karnataka (H) | v | Uttar Pradesh |
| 349 (100.5 overs); CM Gautam 100 (118); Amit Mishra 6/106 (28.5 overs) | | 221/9d (70.3 overs); Parvinder Singh 92 (181); Abhimanyu Mithun 4/70 (17.5 overs) |
| 204 (66.5 overs); Lokesh Rahul 92* (188); Ali Murtaza 6/64 (16.5 overs) | | 240 (63.3 overs); Piyush Chawla 44 (47); Shreyas Gopal 5/59 (16 overs) |

Karnataka won by 94 runs
M. Chinnaswamy Stadium, Bangalore
Umpires: Rajesh Deshpande and Amiesh Saheba

- Uttar Pradesh won the toss and elected to field.

8–11 January
Scorecard

| Punjab | v | Jammu and Kashmir |
| 304 (81.2 overs); Harbhajan Singh 92 (79); Umar Nazir Mir 4/66 (18.2 overs) | | 277 (76.4 overs); Parvez Rasool 103 (137); Sandeep Sharma 4/46 (19 overs) |
| 296 (72.2 overs); Mandeep Singh 101 (151); Parvez Rasool 5/58 (14.2 overs) | | 223 (64.2 overs); Hardeep Singh 76* (135); V. R. V. Singh 5/43 (19 overs) |

Punjab won by 100 runs
Moti Bagh Stadium, Vadodara
Umpires: CK Nandan and Krishnaraj Srinath

- Jammu and Kashmir won the toss and elected to field.

=== Semi-finals ===
18–20 January
Scorecard

| Bengal | v | Maharashtra |
| 114 (41.4 overs); Arindam Das 37 (108); Samad Fallah 7/58 (16.4 overs) | | 455 (126.3 overs); Sangram Atitkar 168 (228); Laxmi Ratan Shukla 3/76 (27 overs) |
| 348 (77.3 overs); Wriddhiman Saha 108* (146); Domnic Joseph 3/80 (20 overs) | | 8/0 (2 overs); Harshad Khadiwale 8 (7) |

Maharashtra won by 10 wickets
Holkar Cricket Stadium, Indore
Umpires: Dennis Smith (SA) and Shavir Tarapore

- Maharashtra won the toss and elected to field.

18–22 January
Scorecard

| Punjab (H) | v | Karnataka |
| 270 (64.5 overs); Jiwanjot Singh 74 (121); Vinay Kumar 5/27 (8 overs) | | 447/5 (146.1 overs); Karun Nair 151* (296); Harbhajan Singh 2/98 (33 overs) |

Match drawn
Punjab Cricket Association Stadium, Mohali
Umpires: Sudhir Asnani and Subrat Das

- Karnataka won the toss and elected to field.
- No play on days 1 and 5 and reduced play on day 4 due to rain.
- Karnataka advanced on first-innings lead.

=== Final ===
29 January – 2 February
Scorecard

| Maharashtra | v | Karnataka |
| 305 (104.1 overs); Ankit Bawne 89 (173); Abhimanyu Mithun 3/49 (23 overs) | | 515 (171.1 overs); Lokesh Rahul 131 (273); Samad Fallah 3/74 (32 overs) |
| 366 (91.2 overs); Kedar Jadhav 112 (135); Shreyas Gopal 4/47 (13.2 overs) | | 157/3 (40.5 overs); Amit Verma 38 (49); Shrikant Mundhe 1/20 (8 overs) |

Karnataka won by 7 wickets
Rajiv Gandhi International Stadium, Hyderabad
Umpires: Anil Chaudhary and Chettithody Shamsuddin

- Maharashtra won the toss and elected to bat

== Statistics ==
=== Most runs ===
| Player | Team | Matches | Runs | Ave | HS | 100s | 50s |
|---|---|---|---|---|---|---|---|
| Kedar Jadhav | Maharashtra | 11 | 1223 | 87.35 | 204 | 6 | 2 |
| Lokesh Rahul | Karnataka | 10 | 1033 | 68.86 | 158 | 3 | 4 |
| Harshad Khadiwale | Maharashtra | 11 | 1004 | 59.05 | 262 | 3 | 4 |
| Saurabh Tiwary | Jharkhand | 7 | 854 | 65.69 | 238 | 1 | 6 |
| Faiz Fazal | Vidarbha | 8 | 845 | 65.00 | 147 | 2 | 6 |

=== Most wickets ===
| Player | Team | Matches | Wickets | Ave. | BBI | BBM | 5/i | 10/m |
|---|---|---|---|---|---|---|---|---|
| Rishi Dhawan | Himachal Pradesh | 8 | 49 | 20.30 | 5/29 | 10/87 | 6 | 1 |
| Anureet Singh | Railways | 8 | 44 | 17.56 | 5/52 | 9/160 | 5 | 0 |
| Abhimanyu Mithun | Karnataka | 10 | 41 | 24.00 | 6/52 | 11/110 | 2 | 1 |
| Ashok Dinda | Bengal | 9 | 40 | 25.97 | 7/82 | 10/157 | 2 | 1 |
| Pankaj Singh | Rajasthan | 8 | 39 | 22.46 | 5/30 | 8/112 | 3 | 0 |

== See also ==
- 2013–14 Irani Cup
