= 2013–14 Irani Cup =

Rest of India	Karnataka
201 & 183	606
- Karnataka won by an innings and 222 runs
- Date: 9 February 2014 – 13 February 2014
- Venue: Chinnaswamy Stadium, Bangalore
- Player of the match: Vinay Kumar (Karnataka)

The 2013–14 Irani Cup, also called 2013-14 Irani Trophy, was the 52nd season of the Irani Cup, a first-class cricket competition in India. It was a one-off match which was played from 9 February 2014 to 13 February 2014 between the 2013–14 Ranji champions Karnataka and the Rest of India team. Chinnaswamy Stadium, the home ground of Karnataka, hosted the match. Karnataka won the match by an innings and 222 runs.

== Squads ==
Karnataka	Rest of India
Playing XI
Robin Uthappa	Jiwanjot Singh
Lokesh Rahul	Gautam Gambhir
Ganesh Satish	Baba Aparajith
Manish Pandey	Kedar Jadhav
Karun Nair	Dinesh Karthik (wk)
CM Gautam (wk)	Mandeep Singh
Stuart Binny	Amit Mishra
Shreyas Gopal	Harbhajan Singh (c)
Vinay Kumar (c)	Anureet Singh
Abhimanyu Mithun	Ashok Dinda
HS Sharath	Pankaj Singh
Reserves
Mayank Agarwal	Ankit Bawne
Amit Verma	Natraj Behera
Abrar Kazi	Parvez Rasool
Sreenath Aravind	Varun Aaron
Ronit More

== Scorecard ==
=== Innings 1 ===
Rest of India 1st innings
Player	Status	Runs	Balls	4s	6s	Strike rate
Jiwanjot Singh	lbw b Vinay Kumar	0	1	0	0	0.00
Gautam Gambhir	lbw b Binny	22	66	1	0	33.33
Baba Aparajith	lbw b Vinay Kumar	2	9	0	0	22.22
Kedar Jadhav	lbw b Vinay Kumar	2	3	0	0	66.66
Dinesh Karthik	c Uthappa b Binny	91	184	14	0	49.45
Mandeep Singh	c Rahul b Binny	5	15	1	0	33.33
Amit Mishra	c Nair b Sharath	47	61	7	1	77.04
Harbhajan Singh	c Ganesh Satish b Vinay Kumar	25	46	3	0	54.34
Anureet Singh	lbw b Vinay Kumar	0	4	0	0	0.00
Ashok Dinda	not out	1	4	0	0	25.00
Pankaj Singh	b Vinay Kumar	0	1	0	0	0.00
Extras	(b 2, lb 3, w 1)	6				
Total	(all out; 65.4 overs)	201				

Fall of wickets: 1–0 (Jiwanjot Singh, 0.1 ov), 2–8 (Aparajith, 2.4 ov), 3–12 (Jadhav, 4.1 ov), 4–54 (Gambhir, 23.1 ov), 5–62 (Mandeep Singh, 27.6 ov), 6–129 (Mishra, 48.4 ov), 7–199 (Karthik, 64.1 ov), 8–199 (Karthik, 64.1 ov), 9–201 (Anureet Singh, 65.3 ov), 10–201 (Pankaj Singh, 65.4 ov)

Karnataka bowling
Bowler	Overs	Maidens	Runs	Wickets	Econ	Wides	NBs
Vinay Kumar	18.4	8	47	6	2.51	{{{wides}}}	{{{no-balls}}}
Abhimanyu Mithun	13	0	53	0	4.07	{{{wides}}}	{{{no-balls}}}
HS Sharath	13	5	34	1	2.61	{{{wides}}}	{{{no-balls}}}
Stuart Binny	15	3	35	3	2.33	{{{wides}}}	{{{no-balls}}}
Shreyas Gopal	3	0	22	0	7.33	{{{wides}}}	{{{no-balls}}}
Manish Pandey	3	1	5	0	1.66	{{{wides}}}	{{{no-balls}}}

=== Innings 2 ===
Karnataka 1st innings
Player	Status	Runs	Balls	4s	6s	Strike rate
Robin Uthappa	c Jadhav b Dinda	0	5	0	0	0.00
Lokesh Rahul	b Anureet Singh	35	63	7	0	55.55
Ganesh Satish	c Jadhav b Harbhajan Singh	84	180	11	0	46.66
Manish Pandey	c Karthik b Pankaj Singh	36	47	7	0	76.59
Karun Nair	b Pankaj Singh	92	161	12	0	57.14
Stuart Binny	b Pankaj Singh	122	122	15	3	100.00
CM Gautam	c Mandeep Singh b Pankaj Singh	122	168	17	1	72.61
Vinay Kumar	c Karthik b Mishra	31	54	4	0	57.40
Shreyas Gopal	c Karthik b Pankaj Singh	16	34	1	0	47.05
Abhimanyu Mithun	not out	34	39	4	1	87.17
HS Sharath	b Pankaj Singh	0	2	0	0	0.00
Extras	(b 20, lb 9, nb 5)	34				
Total	(all out; 145 overs)	606				

Fall of wickets: 1–0 (Uthappa, 0.5 ov), 2-75 (Rahul, 22.5 ov), 3-136 (Pandey, 38.5 ov), 4-188 (Ganesh Satish, 61.3 ov), 5-375 (Nair, 90.4 ov), 6-400 (Binny, 100.6 ov), 7-488 (Vinay Kumar, 121.2 ov), 8-545 (Gopal, 134.1 ov), 9-606 (Gautam, 144.4 ov), 10-606 (Sharath, 144.6 ov)

Rest of India bowling
Bowler	Overs	Maidens	Runs	Wickets	Econ	Wides	NBs
Ashok Dinda	31	5	138	1	4.45	{{{wides}}}	{{{no-balls}}}
Pankaj Singh	35	7	122	6	3.48	{{{wides}}}	{{{no-balls}}}
Anureet Singh	26	6	104	1	4.00	{{{wides}}}	{{{no-balls}}}
Amit Mishra	25	2	100	1	4.00	{{{wides}}}	{{{no-balls}}}
Harbhajan Singh	18	2	82	1	4.55	{{{wides}}}	{{{no-balls}}}
Baba Aparajith	7	1	24	0	3.42	{{{wides}}}	{{{no-balls}}}
Mandeep Singh	3	1	7	0	2.33	{{{wides}}}	{{{no-balls}}}

=== Innings 3 ===
Rest of India 2nd innings
Player	Status	Runs	Balls	4s	6s	Strike rate
Jiwanjot Singh	lbw b Vinay Kumar	7	18	1	0	38.88
Gautam Gambhir	c Pandey b Vinay Kumar	9	8	2	0	112.50
Baba Aparajith	c Binny b Gopal	66	162	8	0	40.74
Kedar Jadhav	c Pandey b Gopal	44	65	7	0	67.69
Dinesh Karthik	b Vinay Kumar	27	61	3	0	44.26
Mandeep Singh	lbw b Vinay Kumar	2	3	0	0	66.66
Amit Mishra	run out (Gopal)	5	5	1	0	100.00
Harbhajan Singh	c Vinay Kumar b Gopal	8	12	1	0	66.66
Anureet Singh	not out	7	11	1	0	63.63
Ashok Dinda	b Gopal	0	1	0	0	0.00
Pankaj Singh	b Gopal	0	1	0	0	0.00
Extras	(b 6, lb 2)	8				
Total	(all out; 57.5 overs)	183				

Fall of wickets: 1–11 (Gambhir, 2.5 ov), 2-20 (Jiwanjot Singh, 6.2 ov), 3-91 (Jadhav, 27.2 ov), 4-140 (Karthik, 46.3 ov), 5-142 (Mandeep Singh, 46.6 ov), 6-151 (Mishra, 49.2 ov), 7-162 (Harbhajan Singh, 53.5 ov), 8-183 (Aparajith, 57.3 ov), 9-183 (Dinda, 57.4 ov), 10-183 (Pankaj Singh, 57.5 ov)

Karnataka bowling
Bowler	Overs	Maidens	Runs	Wickets	Econ	Wides	NBs
Vinay Kumar	16	1	70	4	4.37	{{{wides}}}	{{{no-balls}}}
Abhimanyu Mithun	16	3	41	0	2.56	{{{wides}}}	{{{no-balls}}}
HS Sharath	8	5	11	0	1.37	{{{wides}}}	{{{no-balls}}}
Stuart Binny	6	1	13	0	2.16	{{{wides}}}	{{{no-balls}}}
Shreyas Gopal	9.5	0	35	5	3.55	{{{wides}}}	{{{no-balls}}}
Robin Uthappa	1	0	1	0	1.00	{{{wides}}}	{{{no-balls}}}
Karun Nair	1	0	4	0	4.00	{{{wides}}}	{{{no-balls}}}

== See also ==
- 2013–14 Ranji Trophy
