= 2012–13 Deodhar Trophy =

40th season of the Deodhar Trophy

- Administrator: BCCI
- Cricket format: List A cricket
- Tournament format: Knockout
- Host: Guwahati
- Champions: West Zone (11th title)
- Participants: 5
- Matches: 4

2012–13 Deodhar Trophy was the 40th season of the Deodhar Trophy with the first being the 1973–74 season. It was a List A cricket tournament contested by five teams, North Zone, West Zone, South Zone, Central Zone, East Zone. West Zone won the tournament defeating North Zone in the final.

== Schedule ==
The 2012–13 Deodhar Trophy comprised just four matches played between the teams, where the two teams thar performed the worst in the previous season of the Deodhar Trophy, East Zone and South Zone, need to play an additional knockout game to progress to the semifinals.

The schedule: 1. 10 March – Quarterfinal – South Zone vs East Zone 2. 11 March – Semifinal1 – Central Zone vs North Zone 3. 12 March – Semifinal2 – West Zone vs Winner Quarterfinal 4. 13 March – Final – Winner Semifinal1 vs Winner Semifinal2

== Squads ==
Squads
| Central Zone | East Zone | North Zone | South Zone | West Zone |
|---|---|---|---|---|
| Robin Bist | Ishank Jaggi | Gautam Gambhir (c) | Robin Uthappa | Rohit Sharma |
| Jalaj Saxena | Pallavkumar Das | Paras Dogra | Srikar Bharat | Parthiv Patel (wk) (c) |
| Mohammad Kaif | Sibsankar Roy | Unmukt Chand | Lokesh Rahul | Abhishek Nayar |
| Naman Ojha (wk) | Saurabh Tiwary | Chandan Madan(wk) | Baba Aparajith | Ambati Rayudu |
| Suresh Raina (c) | Manisankar Murasingh | Yuvraj Singh | Chidhambaram Gautam | Kedar Jadhav |
| Akshdeep Nath | Govind Poddar | Mandeep Singh | Dinesh Karthik (wk)(c) | Manprit Juneja |
| Ashok Menaria | Biplab Samantray | Rishi Dhawan | Sachin Baby | Vijay Zol |
| Shrikant Wagh | Wriddhiman Saha (wk) (c) | Rajat Paliwal | Sanju Samson | Sheldon Jackson |
| Amit Paunikar | Pritam Das | Parvinder Awana | Ashish Reddy | Yusuf Pathan |
| Imtiaz Ahmed | Shahbaz Nadeem | Manpreet Gony | Stuart Binny | Munaf Patel |
| Praveen Kumar | Mohammed Shami | Parvez Rasool | Hanuma Vihari | Akshay Darekar |
| Ali Murtaza | Basant Mohanty | Amit Mishra | Sandeep Warrier | Dhawal Kulkarni |
| Piyush Chawla | Abu Nechim | Sandeep Sharma | Vinay Kumar | Rakesh Dhruv |
| Ankit Rajpoot | Iresh Saxena | Rahul Sharma | Abhimanyu Mithun | Jaydev Unadkat |
| Prashant Gupta | Gokul Sharma | Siddarth Kaul | Bodavarapu Sudhakar | Kamlesh Makwana |
| Ishwar Pandey | | Ravi Inder Singh |

== Results ==
=== Quarterfinal ===
10 March 2013
Scorecard

| South Zone; 284/5 (50 overs) | v | East Zone; 273/7 (50 overs) |
| Baba Aparajith 121 (129); Mohammed Shami 2/60 (11 overs) | | Wriddhiman Saha 77 (72); Abhimanyu Mithun 3/40 (10 overs) |

South Zone won by 11 runs
Nehru Stadium, Guwahati
Player of the match: Baba Aparajith (SZ)

- South Zone won the toss and elected to bat

=== Semifinal 1 ===
11 March 2013
Scorecard

| Central Zone; 190 (41.5 overs) | v | North Zone; 160/2 (29.5 overs) |
| Ashok Menaria 34 (39); Amit Mishra 3/50 (10 overs) | | Yuvraj Singh 77* (70); Praveen Kumar 2/28 (7 overs) |

North Zone won by 8 wickets (VJD method)
Nehru Stadium, Guwahati
Player of the match: Yuvraj Singh (NZ)

- North Zone won the toss and elected to field
- North Zone target: 160 runs from 33 overs

=== Semifinal 2 ===
12 March 2013
Scorecard

| South Zone; 258/5 (50 overs) | v | West Zone; 259/5 (41.1 overs) |
| Stuart Binny 65 (54); Munaf Patel 2/48 (10 overs) | | Vijay Zol 75 (88); Abhimanyu Mithun 2/45 (10 overs) |

West Zone won by 5 wickets
Nehru Stadium, Guwahati
Player of the match: Vijay Zol (WZ)

- West Zone won the toss and elected to field

=== Final ===
13 March 2013
Scorecard

| North Zone; 289/8 (50 overs) | v | West Zone; 293/5 (48.2 overs) |
| Unmukt Chand 88 (124); Jaydev Unadkat 2/73 (10 overs) | | Ambati Rayudu 78* (89); Amit Mishra 2/63 (12 overs) |

West Zone won by 5 wickets
Nehru Stadium, Guwahati
Player of the match: Ambati Rayudu (WZ)

- West Zone won the toss and elected to field
