= 2013–14 Syed Mushtaq Ali Trophy =

Indian cricket tournament

- Dates: 30 March 2014 – 20 April 2014
- Administrator(s): BCCI
- Cricket format: T20
- Tournament format(s): Round robin, then knockout
- Champions: Baroda (2nd title)
- Participants: 27
- Matches: 81
- Most runs: Avi Barot (Haryana) (369)
- Most wickets: Lukman Meriwala (Baroda) (21)

The 2013–14 Syed Mushtaq Ali Trophy was the sixth edition of the Syed Mushtaq Ali Trophy, an annual Twenty20 tournament in India. Played from 30 March to 20 April 2014, it was contested by all 27 Ranji Trophy teams. Baroda won the tournament, bagging their second title.

== Squads ==
The squads details of all the 27 participating teams is present here

== Group stage ==
=== West Zone ===
Team	Pld	W	L	T	NR	Pts	NRR
Baroda	4	4	0	0	0	16	1.078
Gujarat	4	2	2	0	0	8	1.195
Mumbai	4	2	2	0	0	8	-0.256
Maharashtra	4	2	2	0	0	8	-0.641
Saurashtra	4	0	4	0	0	0	-1.342

=== Central Zone ===
Team	Pld	W	L	T	NR	Pts	NRR
Uttar Pradesh	4	4	0	0	0	16	1.214
Rajasthan	4	3	1	0	0	12	0.177
Madhya Pradesh	4	2	2	0	0	8	0.625
Railways	4	1	3	0	0	4	-1.243
Vidarbha	4	0	4	0	0	0	-0.902

=== South Zone ===
Team	Pld	W	L	T	NR	Pts	NRR
Goa	5	5	0	0	0	20	2.100
Kerala	5	3	2	0	0	12	0.725
Tamil Nadu	5	2	3	0	0	8	-0.001
Hyderabad	5	2	3	0	0	8	-0.418
Karnataka	5	2	3	0	0	8	-1.003
Andhra	5	1	4	0	0	4	-1.560

=== East Zone ===
Team	Pld	W	L	T	NR	Pts	NRR
Bengal	4	4	0	0	0	16	1.760
Jharkhand	4	2	2	0	0	8	0.253
Assam	4	2	2	0	0	8	-0.307
Orissa	4	2	2	0	0	8	-0.391
Tripura	4	0	4	0	0	0	-1.308

=== North Zone ===
Team	Pld	W	L	T	NR	Pts	NRR
Delhi	5	5	0	0	0	20	0.792
Haryana	5	4	1	0	0	16	0.360
Punjab	5	3	2	0	0	12	-0.352
Himachal Pradesh	5	2	3	0	0	8	0.187
Services	5	1	4	0	0	4	-0.310
Jammu and Kashmir	5	0	5	0	0	0	-0.584

== Super League Stage ==
=== Group A ===
Team	Pld	W	L	T	NR	Pts	NRR
Uttar Pradesh	4	3	1	0	0	12	0.906
Goa	4	3	1	0	0	12	0.879
Haryana	4	2	2	0	0	8	0.048
Gujarat	4	2	2	0	0	8	0.026
Jharkhand	4	0	4	0	0	0	-1.754

=== Group B ===
Team	Pld	W	L	T	NR	Pts	NRR
Baroda	4	3	1	0	0	12	0.774
Kerala	4	3	1	0	0	12	0.661
Delhi	4	2	2	0	0	8	-0.168
Rajasthan	4	2	2	0	0	8	-0.253
Bengal	4	0	4	0	0	0	-1.010

== Final ==
Final
14 April 2014
Scorecard

Baroda; 144/7 (20 overs)	v	Uttar Pradesh; 141/7 (20 overs)
Aditya Waghmode 42 (31); Ali Murtaza 2/22 (4 overs)		Prashant Gupta 68 (53); Lukman Meriwala 3/31 (4 overs)

Baroda won by 3 runs
Wankhede Stadium, Mumbai
Umpires: Pashchim Pathak and Rajesh Deshpande

- Uttar Pradesh won the toss and elected to field.
- Kamran Shaikh (Baroda) made his T20 debut.
