= Vinoop Manoharan =

Indian cricketer

Personal information
- Born: 10 June 1992 (age 34); Alappuzha, Kerala, India
- Batting: Right-handed
- Bowling: Right-arm offbreak
- Role: All-rounder

Domestic team information
- Years: Team
- 2013-present: Kerala
- Source: Cricinfo, 21 October 2015

Vinoop Manoharan (born 10 June 1992) is an Indian cricketer who plays for Kerala in domestic cricket. He is an all-rounder who bats right-handed and bowls right-arm off-spin.

== Domestic career ==
Vinoop made his List A debut on 26 February 2012 for Kerala in the 2011-12 Vijay Hazare Trophy. He made his first-class debut on 27 October 2013, for Kerala in the 2013–14 Ranji Trophy. He scored a 71, batting at number 8 and took a 5-wicket haul in the second innings of a Ranji game against Himachal Pradesh in the season. He made his T20 debut for Kerala on 1 April 2014 in the 2013-14 Syed Mushtaq Ali Trophy.

He was recalled to the Kerala Ranji Trophy squad for the 2018-19 Ranji Trophy after a hiatus of five years after his debut. He was promoted in batting order to play as an opener in a match against Himachal Pradesh in the tournament and scored a match-winning 96 off 143 leading kerala to the quarter-final.

He is an employee of State Bank of India and represents them in club cricket.
