= Niranjan Behera =

Indian cricketer (born 1984)

Personal information
- Full name: Niranjan Jayaram Behera
- Born: 2 May 1984 (age 42); Cuttack, India
- Batting: Right-handed
- Bowling: Right-arm offbreak
- Role: Allrounder

Domestic team information
- Years: Team
- 2002/03-2014/15: Odisha
- FC debut: 14 December 2002 Odisha v Uttarpradesh
- Last FC: 17 December 2014 Odisha v Gujarat
- T20 debut: 3 April 2007 Odisha v Jharkhand cricket team
- Last T20: 13 March 2011 Odisha v Madhya Pradesh cricket team

Career statistics
Competition	FC	LA	T20
Matches	71	34	16
Runs scored	3269	699	383
Batting average	31.43	25.88	27.35
100s/50s	3/27	0/4	0/3
Top score	131	90	57
Balls bowled	4044	1243	316
Wickets	34	28	20
Bowling average	39.14	32.10	16.45
5 wickets in innings	0	0	0
10 wickets in match	0	0	0
Best bowling	4/16	4/13	3/11
Catches/stumpings
- Source: ESPNcricinfo, 23 January 2019

Niranjan Jayaram Behera, also known professionally as Niranjan Behera (born 2 May 1984), is an Indian cricketer who played for Odisha.

== Early life ==
Behera was born in 1984 in Cuttack to Jayaram Behera and Manorama Behera. He has been married to a girl named Swagatika. He learned the basics of cricket at a private cricket club in Cuttack.

== Career ==
Behera started his cricketing career as an allrounder, playing List-A cricket in 1999-00 Vijay Hajare Trophy for the Odisha cricket team. He made his debut in the 2002–03 Ranji Trophy for Odisha. He last played for Odisha against Gujarat cricket team in the 2013-14 Ranji Trophy Season. Behera was selected to coach the U-19 Odisha cricket team in 2018.
