= Shalabh Shrivastava =

Indian cricketer (born 1986)

Personal information
- Full name: Shalabh Umeshchandra Shrivastava
- Born: 2 February 1986 (age 40); Nagpur, Maharashtra, India
- Batting: Right-handed
- Bowling: Right-arm medium
- Role: Batsman

Domestic team information
- Years: Team
- 2005–: Vidarbha

Career statistics
Competition	FC	LA	T20
Matches	47	21	20
Runs scored	2,390	520	313
Batting average	37.93	28.88	18.41
100s/50s	2/15	0/4	0/0
Top score	193	83*	44
Balls bowled	281	36	61
Wickets	5	0	6
Bowling average	37.40	–	11.00
5 wickets in innings	0	–	0
10 wickets in match	0	–	0
Best bowling	2/38	–	3/13
Catches/stumpings	39/–	12/–	10/–
- Source: ESPN Cricinfo, 14 January 2014

Shalabh Umeshchandra Shrivastava (born 2 February 1986) is an Indian first-class cricketer. He is a right-handed batsman for Vidarbha and made his first-class debut in 2005. He was made the captain of Vidarbha for 2013–14 Ranji Trophy.
