= Siva Kumar =

Indian cricketer

Personal information
- Full name: Duvvarapu Siva Kumar
- Born: 11 February 1990 (age 36); Sidhantham, Andhra Pradesh, India
- Batting: Right-handed
- Bowling: Right-arm fast-medium
- Role: Bowling all-rounder

International information
- National side: United States
- Only T20I (cap 29): 15 July 2022 v Netherlands

Domestic team information
- Years: Team
- 2009–2018: Andhra

Career statistics
Competition	T20I	FC	LA	T20
Matches	1	42	40	16
Runs scored	7	1,061	522	82
Batting average	7.00	22.10	20.07	11.71
100s/50s	0/0	1/4	0/3	0/0
Top score	7	106*	67*	22
Balls bowled	12	7,056	1,918	302
Wickets	0	133	45	15
Bowling average	–	18.19	29.64	22.80
5 wickets in innings	0	6	1	0
10 wickets in match	–	2	–	–
Best bowling	–	7/30	5/20	4/6
Catches/stumpings	0/–	7/–	6/–	5/–
- Source: Cricinfo, 15 July 2024

Duvvarapu Siva Kumar (born 11 February 1990) is an Indian-born American cricketer who played for Andhra cricket team. He is a bowling all-rounder who bats right-handed and bowls right-arm fast-medium. He was a member of the India Under-19 cricket team that won the 2008 ICC Under-19 Cricket World Cup. He moved to the United States to play in the Minor League Cricket. He made his international debut for the United States cricket team in July 2022.

== Career ==
Siva Kumar was selected in the India Under-19 squad that toured South Africa in January 2008. He played in the triangular Youth ODI series against Bangladesh Under-19s and South Africa Under-19s as well as one Youth Test against South Africa Under-19s. He was picked in the squad for the 2008 ICC Under-19 Cricket World Cup but did not get a match in the tournament which India won.

He made his first-class debut in December 2009 playing for Andhra against Haryana during the 2009-10 Ranji Trophy. He played in three matches in that Ranji season and picked 10 wickets at an average of 15.60 and also scored 92 runs at 30.66. He played four matches in the 2010-11 Ranji Trophy and picked up 6 wickets at 21.33 and scored 96 runs at 32.00. He had a disappointing 2011-12 Ranji Trophy in which he managed to pick just two wickets at 56.00 and score 72 runs at 18.00 in three matches.

He was impressive in the 2012-13 Ranji Trophy, picking 17 wickets at 22.35 with the best bowling figures of 6/45 and scoring 273 runs at 45.50 including an unbeaten 106. He continued his good all-round performance in the 2013–14 Ranji Trophy in which he picked 18 wickets at 19.11 and scored 198 runs at 23.62.

He was the third-highest wicket-taker in 2014–15 Ranji Trophy taking 44 wickets at an average of 14.25 with four five-wicket hauls and two ten-wicket hauls. His best performance came in the quarterfinal against Maharashtra at Rohtak where he took 6/41 and 6/79. Siva Kumar had played fewer matches and bowled over 50 overs lesser than the two leading wicket-takers of the tournament (Karnataka's Vinay Kumar and Mumbai's Shardul Thakur), but his average and best bowling figures were better than any bowler on the list.

In July 2022, he was added to the USA's Twenty20 International (T20I) squad for the 2022 ICC Men's T20 World Cup Global Qualifier B tournament in Zimbabwe. He made his T20I debut on 15 July 2022, for the United States against the Netherlands in the semi-finals of the tournament.
