= Rashmi Parida =

Indian cricketer (born 1977)

Personal information
- Full name: Rashmi Ranjan Parida
- Born: 7 July 1977 (age 49); Bhubaneswar, Odisha, India
- Batting: Right-handed
- Bowling: Right-arm leg-break
- Role: Batsman

Domestic team information
- Years: Team
- 1994–2008: Odisha
- 2008–2009: Assam
- 2010–2013: Rajasthan
- 2013-2014: Vidarbha
- 2014-2015: Himachal Pradesh

Career statistics
Competition	FC	LA
Matches	130	65
Runs scored	8,005	2050
Batting average	42.80	37.96
100s/50s	16/47	2/15
Top score	220	122
Balls bowled	42	18
Wickets	0	0
Bowling average	-	-
5 wickets in innings	0	0
10 wickets in match	0	n/a
Best bowling	-	-
Catches/stumpings	110/-	25/-
- Source: Cricinfo, 18 December 2013

Rashmi Ranjan Parida (born 7 July 1977) is an Indian former cricketer. He has played for Odisha, Rajasthan, Vidarbha and Assam cricket teams in domestic tournaments. Primarily a right-handed batsman, he made his debut for Odisha in 1994 and played for them till 2008. He then turned professional and played for Assam for a year. He then played for Rajasthan and played a crucial role in their promotion from plate group and in winning the 2010–11 Ranji Trophy. In the 2013–14 Ranji Trophy he decided to play for Vidarbha.
