= Rameez Khan =

Indian cricketer (born 1989)

Personal information
- Born: 31 December 1989 (age 36); Sagar, Madhya Pradesh, India
- Batting: Left-handed
- Bowling: Slow left arm orthodox

Domestic team information
- Years: Team
- 2008–2022: Madhya Pradesh
- Source: Cricinfo, 31 December 2024

Rameez Khan (born 31 December 1989) is an Indian first-class cricketer who plays for Madhya Pradesh.
