= Piyush Khakhar =

Indian cricketer (born 1965)

Personal information
- Born: 22 October 1965 (age 61); Rajkot, India

Umpiring information
- WODIs umpired: 2 (2011)
- WT20Is umpired: 4 (2011–2016)
- Source: Cricinfo, 24 October 2015

Piyush Khakhar (born 22 October 1965) is an Indian former first-class cricketer. He is now an umpire and has stood in matches in the Ranji Trophy.
