= Obaid Haroon =

Indian cricketer (born 1986)

Personal information
- Full name: Obaid Haroon
- Born: 2 December 1986 (age 39); Srinagar, Jammu and Kashmir
- Batting: Right-handed
- Role: Wicket-keeper

Domestic team information
- Years: Team
- 2009: Jammu & Kashmir

Career statistics
| Competition | FC | LA | T20 |
|---|---|---|---|
| Matches | 13 | 5 | 7 |
| Runs scored | 501 | 33 | 21 |
| Batting average | 25.05 | 11.00 | 3.50 |
| 100s/50s | 0/3 | 0/0 | 0/0 |
| Top score | 94 | 17 | 12 |
| Catches/stumpings | 30/5 | 4/1 | 4/0 |
- Source: ESPNcricinfo, 8 August, 2014

Obaid Haroon (born 2 December 1986) is an Indian cricketer.

He is a right-handed wicket-keeper batsman who can open the batting for Jammu and Kashmir cricket team. He first came to the domestic team in October 2009 in a T20 team. He was re-introduced to team December 2012.

In November 2013, Haroon took five catches in Kerala's first innings, the first time he has collected five dismissals in his first-class career from eight matches.
