= Sachin Chaudhari =

Indian cricketer (born 1986)

Personal information
- Born: 27 March 1986 (age 40); Nagpur, India
- Source: Cricinfo, 21 October 2015

Sachin Chaudhari (born 27 March 1986) is an Indian first-class cricketer who plays for Maharashtra.
