= Nizar Niyas =

Indian cricketer (born 1990)

Personal information
- Born: 18 August 1990 (age 36); Balaramapuram, Kerala, India
- Batting: Right-handed
- Bowling: Right-arm medium
- Role: Allrounder

Domestic team information
- Years: Team
- 2008 - 2017: Kerala
- Source: ESPNcricinfo, 11 October 2015

Nizar Niyas (born 18 August 1990) is an Indian first-class cricketer who plays for Kerala.
