= Harshad Gadekar =

Indian cricketer (born 1986)

Personal information
- Full name: Harshad Hanumant Gadekar
- Born: 5 December 1986 (age 39); Goa, India
- Source: ESPNcricinfo, 23 October 2015

Harshad Hanumant Gadekar (born 5 December 1986) is an Indian first-class cricketer who plays for Goa.

On 25 July 2023, Gadekar announced retirement from all forms of cricket.
