= Gonnabattula Chiranjeevi =

Indian cricketer (born 1992)

Personal information
- Full name: Gonnabattula Kanakaraju Chiranjeevi
- Born: 18 June 1992 (age 34); Visakhapatnam, Andhra Pradesh, India
- Nickname: Chiru
- Batting: Right-handed
- Bowling: Right-arm medium
- Role: Batter

Domestic team information
- Years: Team
- 2014: Andhra
- 2017: Railways
- Puducherry
- Source: ESPNcricinfo, 22 June 2022

Gonnabattula Kanakaraju Chiranjeevi (born 18 June 1992) is an Indian cricketer who represents Puducherry in domestic cricket.
