= Samrat Singha =

Indian cricketer (born 1989)

Personal information
- Full name: Samrat Madhusudan Singha
- Born: 10 December 1989 (age 36); Agartala, Tripura, India
- Source: Cricinfo, 23 October 2015

Samrat Singha (born 10 December 1989) is an Indian first-class cricketer who plays for Tripura.
