= Girjia Rout =

Indian cricketer (born 1991)

Personal information
- Full name: Girjia Ganeswar Rout
- Born: 12 May 1991 (age 35); Cuttack, India
- Source: ESPNcricinfo, 11 October 2015

Girjia Ganeswar Rout, known professionally as Girjia Rout, (born 12 May 1991) is an Indian first-class cricketer who plays for Odisha.
