= Kaustubh Pawar =

Indian cricketer (born 1990)

Personal information
- Full name: Kaustubh Rawalnath Pawar
- Born: 13 September 1990 (age 36); Mumbai, Maharashtra, India
- Batting: Right-handed
- Bowling: Right-arm medium
- Role: Opening batsman

Domestic team information
- Years: Team
- 2011–2016: Mumbai

Career statistics
Competition	FC
Matches	33
Runs scored	1,629
Batting average	30.73
100s/50s	4/6
Top score	161
Balls bowled	540
Wickets	6
Bowling average	44.66
5 wickets in innings	0
10 wickets in match	0
Best bowling	2/21
Catches/stumpings	34/–
- Source: ESPNcricinfo, 10 January 2014

Kaustubh Rawalnath Pawar (born 13 September 1990) is a cricketer who has played for Mumbai in Indian domestic cricket. He is a right-hand opening batsman and a right arm medium bowler.
