= Shaik Basha =

Indian cricketer (born 1993)

Personal information
- Born: 22 May 1993 (age 33); Narasaraopet, Andhra Pradesh India
- Batting: Right handed
- Bowling: Right arm offbreak

Domestic team information
- Years: Team
- Andhra Pradesh
- Source: Cricinfo, 23 October 2015

Shaik Basha (born 22 May 1993) is an Indian first-class cricketer who plays for Andhra Pradesh.
