= Marripuri Suresh =

Indian cricketer (born 1983)

Personal information
- Born: 21 December 1983 (age 42); Kadapa, India
- Source: ESPNcricinfo, 21 October 2015

Marripuri Suresh (born 21 December 1983) is an Indian first-class cricketer who plays for Andhra Pradesh.
