= Sandeep Singh (cricketer, born 1981) =

Indian cricketer (born 1981)

Personal information
- Born: 18 February 1981 (age 45); Nagpur, India
- Source: Cricinfo, 17 October 2015

Sandeep Singh (born 18 February 1981) is an Indian first-class cricketer who plays for Vidarbha.
