= Ketul Patel =

Indian cricketer (born 1988)

Personal information
- Born: 26 February 1988 (age 38); Baroda, India
- Source: ESPNcricinfo, 18 October 2015

Ketul Patel (born 26 February 1988) is an Indian first-class cricketer who plays for Baroda.
