= Yogesh Takawale =

Indian cricketer (born 1984)

Personal information
- Full name: Yogesh Vijay Takawale
- Born: 5 November 1984 (age 42); Pune, Maharashtra, India.
- Batting: Right-handed
- Role: Batsman, Wicket-keeper

Domestic team information
- Years: Team
- 2006–2010: Maharashtra
- 2011–2014: Tripura
- 2008–2009: Mumbai Indians
- 2014–2015: Royal Challengers Bangalore

Career statistics
Competition	FC	LA	T20
Matches	38	27	39
Runs scored	2,294	802	741
Batting average	41.70	34.86	24.70
100s/50s	5/12	1/3	0/4
Top score	212	108	89
Balls bowled	108	18	0
Wickets	1	1	–
Bowling average	51.00	13.00	–
5 wickets in innings	0	0	–
10 wickets in match	0	0	–
Best bowling	1/35	1/35	–
Catches/stumpings	58/3	24/2	22/8
- Source: ESPNcricinfo, 11 December 2024

Yogesh Vijay Takawale (born 5 November 1984) is an Indian cricketer. He made his first-class debut in 2005–06 as a specialist batsman for Maharashtra.

In 2013–14 he captained Tripura in the Ranji Trophy and scored Tripura's highest first-class score of 212 against Hyderabad. He also plays for the IPL team Royal Challengers Bangalore.
