= Siddharth Saraf =

Indian cricketer (born 1992)

Personal information
- Full name: Siddharth Kamal Saraf
- Born: 16 October 1992 (age 34); Jaipur, Rajasthan, India
- Batting: Right-handed

Domestic team information
- Years: Team
- 2018/19: Rajasthan
- Source: Cricinfo, 17 October 2015

Siddharth Saraf (born 16 October 1992) is an Indian cricketer who plays for Rajasthan. He made his Twenty20 debut for Rajasthan in the 2018–19 Syed Mushtaq Ali Trophy on 2 March 2019.
