= Adil Reshi =

Indian cricketer (born 1989)

Personal information
- Born: 1 February 1989 (age 37); Basant Bagh, Srinagar, India
- Batting: Right-handed
- Bowling: Right-hand medium
- Role: Batsman

Domestic team information
- Years: Team
- 2011–2016: Jammu & Kashmir
- Source: ESPNcricinfo, 11 October 2015

Adil Reshi (born 1 February 1989) is an Indian first-class cricketer who plays for Jammu & Kashmir. In November 2013, Rishi scored maiden century in first-class cricket in 14 matches. He was Jammu and Kashmir's highest scorer in the Ranji Trophy in 2013–14.
