= Tushar Saha =

Indian cricketer (born 1985)

Personal information
- Full name: Tushar Swapan Saha
- Born: 20 September 1985 (age 41); Agartala, Tripura, India
- Source: Cricinfo, 11 October 2015

Tushar Saha (born 20 September 1985) is an Indian first-class cricketer who plays for Tripura.
