= Rameez Nemat =

Indian cricketer (born 1986)

Personal information
- Full name: Rameez Khan Nemat
- Born: 14 November 1986 (age 39)
- Batting: Right-handed

Domestic team information
- Years: Team
- Jharkhand
- Source: Cricinfo, 11 October 2017

Rameez Nemat (born 14 November 1986) is an Indian first-class cricketer who plays for Jharkhand.

== Early life ==
Nemat's father is a professor of social work at Jamia Millia Islamia, and his mother is a school teacher. He did his schooling from Delhi Public School, Mathura Road, and went on to pursue BA Political Science and MBA from Jamia Millia Islamia.

== Career ==
Nemat started playing cricket at the age of 12 and represented Delhi at the Under-14, Under-16 and Under-19 levels. He later moved to Jharkhand and was made captain of the state Under-22 team in 2008–09. He became a member of the state Ranji team in the same year.
