= Murumulla Sriram =

Indian cricketer (born 1992)

Personal information
- Born: 21 September 1992 (age 34); Visakhapatnam, Andhra Pradesh, India
- Batting: Right handed
- Bowling: Right arm offbreak
- Source: ESPNcricinfo, 7 October 2015

Murumulla Sriram (born 21 September 1992) is an Indian first-class cricketer who plays for Andhra Pradesh.
