= Satyam Choudhary =

Indian cricketer (born 1990)

Personal information
- Born: 25 November 1990 (age 35); Mhow, India
- Source: Cricinfo, 17 October 2015

Satyam Choudhary (born 25 November 1990) is an Indian cricketer who plays for Madhya Pradesh.
