= Keenan Vaz =

Indian cricketer (born 1991)

Personal information
- Full name: Keenan Aghelo Vaz
- Born: 12 September 1991 (age 35); Margao, Goa, India
- Batting: Right-handed
- Role: Wicketkeeper
- Source: ESPNcricinfo

Keenan Vaz (born 12 September 1991) is an Indian first-class cricketer. He is part of Goa cricket team as wicket-keeper-batsman. He has also played U-19 South zone has been part of the National cricket academy.
