= Abhijit Dey =

Indian cricketer (born 1987)

Personal information
- Born: 30 December 1987 (age 38)
- Source: ESPNcricinfo, 11 October 2015

Abhijit Dey (born 30 December 1987) is an Indian first-class cricketer who plays for Tripura.
