= Suryaprakash Suwalka =

Indian cricketer (born 1992)

Personal information
- Born: 6 December 1992 (age 33); Bhilwara, India
- Source: Cricinfo, 6 October 2015

Suryaprakash Suwalka (born 6 December 1992) is an Indian first-class cricketer who plays for Rajasthan.
