= Sachin Rana =

Indian cricketer (born 1984)

Personal information
- Born: 18 September 1984 (age 42); Gurgaon, Haryana, India
- Batting: Right-handed
- Bowling: Right arm fast medium
- Role: Allrounder

Domestic team information
- Years: Team
- 2004/05–2015/16: Haryana
- 2011: Pune Warriors India
- 2014: Royal Challengers Bangalore
- 2016: Prime Bank Cricket Club
- 2017/18: Abahani Limited cricket team

Career statistics
Competition	FC	T20
Matches	48	23
Runs scored	2448	361
Batting average	32.21	20.05
100s/50s	5/11	0/1
Top score	163*	62
Balls bowled	–	–
Wickets	125	18
Bowling average	22.36	19.44
5 wickets in innings	–	–
10 wickets in match	–	–
Best bowling	5/32;	–
Catches/stumpings	53/–	11/–
- Source: ESPNcricinfo, 14 March 2012

Sachin Rana (born 18 September 1984 in Gurgaon, Haryana) is an Indian former cricketer. He made his List A debut in 2003-04 and his first-class debut in 2004–05; he has since played for Haryana, North Zone and Pune Warriors India as a right-handed middle order batsman. He made his Twenty20 debut against the Punjab team in 2007, and he played for the Pune Warriors India in the IPL 2011 season. He was signed by Sunrisers Hyderabad in the IPL 2013 season and played nine matches for Royal Challengers Bangalore in IPL 2014.
