= Padmanabhan Prasanth =

Indian first class cricketer (born 1985)

Personal information
- Full name: Padmanabhan Prasanth
- Born: 22 May 1985 (age 41); Trivandrum, Kerala, India
- Nickname: Prashu
- Batting: Left-handed
- Bowling: Slow Left-Arm Orthodox
- Role: Allrounder

Domestic team information
- Years: Team
- 2006–2018: Kerala
- 2011: Kochi Tuskers Kerala
- Source: ESPNcricinfo, 12 April 2021

Padmanabhan Prasanth (born 22 May 1985) is an Indian former first-class cricketer who played for Kerala.

== Biography ==
Prasanth was born in Thiruvananthapuram, Kerala, India. He spent his entire career playing first class cricket for his native Kerala.

He goes by the nickname, 'Prashu'.

== Playing style ==
Prasanth is an all-rounder. He is a left-handed batsmen and bowls slow left arm orthodox bowler.

While not being a prodigious turner of the ball, his accuracy coupled with subtle variations in pace made him ideally suited to white ball cricket.

== Indian Premier League ==
Prasanth was bought at auction by Kochi Tuskers Kerala for the 2011 IPL but struggled to gain playing time in a squad that also included slow left arm orthodox options in Ravindra Jadeja and Steve O'Keefe.

He had to wait until the penultimate game of the 2011 season against Rajasthan Royals before making his debut for the franchise by which time The Tuskers hopes of making the playoffs had already been extinguished. Prasanth bowled a single over to Australian all-rounder Shane Watson which went for 18 runs with Watson striking 3 sixes in the process. To date it remains the only over he has bowled in the IPL.

Prasanth was not selected for the final game of the season and the Kochi Tuskers Kerala franchise was disbanded during the offseason. Prasanth was brought by Sunrisers Hyderabad at both the 2013 and 2015 IPL auctions but in neither corresponding season did he make another IPL appearance.

== Domestic cricket ==
Despite limited playing time in the IPL, Padmanabhan credits his experience training alongside his international teammates at Sunrisers Hyderabad with an improvement in his game. He returned to domestic T20 cricket with Kerala. As of March 2024 Padmanabhan is Kerala's all-time leading wicket taker in T20 cricket with 64 wickets to his name.
