= Koteswar Rao (cricketer) =

Indian cricketer (born 1987)

Personal information
- Full name: Tokala Koteswar Rao
- Born: 24 December 1987 (age 38); Kotrapadu, Andhra Pradesh, India
- Source: ESPNcricinfo, 17 October 2015

Koteswar Rao (born 24 December 1987) is an Indian first-class cricketer who plays for Services.
