= Gagandeep Singh (cricketer, born 1987) =

Indian cricketer (born 1987)

Personal information
- Born: 26 June 1987 (age 39); Vadodara, Gujarat
- Batting: Left-handed
- Bowling: Left-arm medium

Gagandeep Singh (born 26 June 1987) is an Indian cricketer. He plays for Baroda. Gagandeep's performance in the Elite Group B match of the Ranji Trophy at the Motibaug ground in December 2011 helped Baroda secure a 241 run win against Gujarat. His five wickets for 29 runs meant Gujarat was shot out for 123, chasing a target of 365 for victory.
