= Buddhadev Mangaldas =

Indian cricketer (born 1988)

Personal information
- Born: 20 June 1988 (age 38); Bangalore, Karnataka, India

Domestic team information
- Years: Team
- 2012–2015: Goa

Career statistics
Competition	First-class	List A
Matches	8	8
Runs scored	63	49
Batting average	12.60	16.33
100s/50s	0/0	0/0
Top score	41	17
Balls bowled	12	1041
Wickets	11	7
Bowling average	43.90	35.42
5 wickets in innings	0	0
10 wickets in match	0	0
Best bowling	3/66	2/30
Catches/stumpings	0/–	3/–
- Source: ESPNcricinfo, 10 October 2015

Buddhadev Mangaldas (born 20 June 1988) is an Indian first-class cricketer who plays for Goa.
