= Chovvakkaran Shahid =

Indian cricketer (born 1983)

Personal information
- Born: 8 February 1983 (age 43); Thalassery, India
- Source: ESPNcricinfo, 21 October 2015

Chovvakkaran Shahid (born 8 February 1983) is an Indian first-class cricketer who plays for Kerala. He made his first-class debut for Kerala against Goa on November 24, 2012, in the 2012-13 Ranji Trophy. He made his List A debut for Kerala against Hyderabad in the 2012-13 Vijay Hazare Trophy.
