= R. Sundar =

Indian cricket umpire (born 1963)

Personal information
- Full name: R. Sundar
- Born: 15 April 1963 (age 63)

Umpiring information
- Source: ESPNcricinfo, 21 October 2016

R. Sundar (born 15 April 1963) is an Indian cricket umpire. He has stood in matches in the Ranji Trophy tournament.
