= Bhamashah Stadium =

Cricket ground in Uttar Pradesh, India

- Shantanu Bhardwaj Ranji Cricket Stadium
- Location: Meerut, Uttar Pradesh
- Country: India
- Establishment: 2003
- Capacity: 4,500
- Owner: Meerut College
- Operator: Meerut District Cricket Association
- Tenants: Uttar Pradesh cricket team
- End names
- Suraj Kund Pavilion End

Bhamashah Stadium is a ground also Known as Shantanu Bhardwaj Ranji Cricket Stadium in Meerut, Uttar Pradesh. It has hosted five matches for Uttar Pradesh cricket team till November 2013 since making its debut in 2003 when Uttar Pradesh cricket team played against Punjab cricket team as match ended in a draw. Manish Pandey scored 194 in a match between Karnataka cricket team and home team Uttar Pradesh cricket team. The stadium is home of Indian fast-bowler Praveen Kumar and Bhuvneshwar Kumar. It is a domestic cricket stadium.
