= Nitin Bhille =

Indian cricketer (born 1989)

Personal information
- Born: 18 August 1989 (age 37); Dharwad, India
- Source: ESPNcricinfo, 17 October 2015

Nitin Bhille (born 18 August 1989) is an Indian first-class cricketer who plays for Railways.
