= Utkarsh Patel =

Indo-Canadian Entrepreneur

Personal information
- Born: 25 April 1974 (age 52); Dharmaj, India
- Source: Cricinfo, 17 October 2015

Utkarsh Patel (born 25 April 1974) is an Indo-Canadian entrepreneur.
