= Jaskaran Singh =

Jaskaran Singh may refer to:

- Jaskaran Singh (cricketer, born 1989), Indian cricketer who plays for Chandigarh
- Jaskaran Singh (cricketer, born 1991), Indian cricketer who plays for Jharkhand
- Jas Singh (cricketer, born 2002), English cricketer who plays for Kent
- Jaskaran Singh (field hockey), Indian field hockey midfielder
