= Shailender Gehlot =

Indian cricketer (born 1984)

Personal information
- Born: 23 November 1984 (age 41); Bhilwara, India
- Batting: Right-handed
- Role: bowler
- Source: Cricinfo, 18 October 2015

Shailender Gehlot (born 23 November 1984) is an Indian first-class cricketer who plays for Railways.
