= Rahul Kanojia =

Indian cricketer (born 1994)

Personal information
- Full name: Rahul Rajkumar Kanojia
- Born: 26 December 1994 (age 31); Amritsar, Punjab, India
- Source: Cricinfo, 18 October 2015

Rahul Kanojia (born 26 December 1994) is an Indian first-class cricketer who plays for Services.
