= Rahul Dewan =

Indian cricketer

Personal information
- Full name: Rahul Dewan
- Born: 15 July 1986 (age 40); Delhi, India
- Batting: Right-handed
- Bowling: Right arm offbreak
- Role: Opening batsman

Domestic team information
- Years: Team
- 2008/09–present: Haryana
- Sylhet Division

Career statistics
Competition	FC	LA	T20
Matches	41	27	18
Runs scored	2839	957	336
Batting average	41.14	36.80	21.00
100s/50s	6/14	2/5	0/0
Top score	254*	131*	47
Balls bowled	443	125	6
Wickets	3	4	1
Bowling average	99.33	22.50	3.00
5 wickets in innings	0	0	0
10 wickets in match	0	0	0
Best bowling	1/8	4/18	1/3
Catches/stumpings	30/–	10/–	6/–
- Source: ESPNcricinfo, 6 January 2013

Rahul Dewan (born 15 July 1986) is an Indian cricketer. He is a right-handed batsman and a right-arm off-break bowler who plays for Haryana. He was born in Delhi.

== Career ==
Dewan began his career playing for Delhi Under-19s in the 2004–05 season before moving up to the under-22s, for whom he played for three seasons before making his break into First-Class Cricket. In his last season for Delhi Under-22s, also as a captain, he scored 623 runs in 4 matches with 3 centuries including a marathon knock of 306.

The Board of Control for Cricket in India awarded him with the M.A.Chidambaram Trophy for the Best Junior Cricketer in the Country for the season 2007–08. He also appeared for the Delhi Daredevils in the inaugural edition of the IPL.

Dewan made his First-Class Debut for Haryana in the first match of the Ranji Trophy competition of 2008–09. Dewan scored 12 runs in the first innings of the game and 66 runs in the second innings, the highest score of Haryana second innings. In only his third Ranji Trophy game he scored his first century (254* vs Kerala) in first-class cricket.

Some of his other marathon efforts on the cricket field include Scoring 144 n.o. and carrying the bat through against England test team in a tour game on their tour to India in Nov 2012. Scoring 273 vs Orissa, the Highest Individual Score of Ranji Trophy season 2013–14.

He has been a consistent performer for Haryana and North Zone in first-class cricket. He has been a member of the Deodhar Trophy winning North Zone team twice in 2009-10 and 2010–11.

He has been the key factor in Haryana's growth from a struggling plate division team to a major force in the Elite league over the last few years. In the last 8 years since he broke into the Haryana squad, the team has managed to reach the semi-finals and quarter finals consistently across different formats.

Dewan has captained Haryana Ranji Trophy in many games from the 2010–11 season onwards. His last 3 seasons have been scarred due to 2 shoulder surgeries on the same shoulder because of which he had to miss a lot of games, Still he has an impressive aggregate of more than 5000 runs in First class cricket across all formats.

Played ECB Premier Division Cricket in UK for Brooke cc in 2010 and in 2013 for Vauxhall Mallards cc. Played Professional Cricket in Bangladesh in 2012.
