= Dhiren Mistry =

Indian cricketer (born 1992)

Personal information
- Born: 5 September 1992 (age 34); Vadodara, Gujarat, India
- Batting: Right-handed
- Role: Batsman

Domestic team information
- Years: Team
- Baroda Cricket Association
- Source: ESPNcricinfo, 18 October 2015

Dhiren Mistry (born 5 September 1992) is an Indian first-class cricketer who plays for Barodaas a right-handed batsman.
