= Suraj Yadav =

Indian cricketer (born 1987)

Personal information
- Born: 26 October 1987 (age 39); New Delhi, India
- Source: Cricinfo, 16 October 2015

Suraj Yadav (born 26 October 1987) is an Indian first-class cricketer who plays for Services.
