= Syed Mohammed =

Indian cricketer (born 1983)

Personal information
- Full name: Jamaluddin Syed Mohammed
- Born: 3 June 1983 (age 43); Madras, Tamil Nadu, India
- Batting: Left-handed
- Bowling: Slow left arm orthodox
- Role: Bowling all-rounder

Domestic team information
- Years: Team
- 2005/06–2010/11: Tamil Nadu
- 2007–2009: Chennai Superstars
- 2011–2013: Royal Challengers Bangalore
- 2012/13–2016/17: Assam

Career statistics
Competition	FC	LA	T20
Matches	41	30	45
Runs scored	1,577	472	403
Batting average	27.66	24.84	22.38
100s/50s	2/9	0/2	0/0
Top score	121	59	42*
Balls bowled	6,945	1.345	828
Wickets	104	20	37
Bowling average	29.75	48.35	28.00
5 wickets in innings	4	0	0
10 wickets in match	1	0	0
Best bowling	7/44	3/21	3/15
Catches/stumpings	30/–	7/–	11/–
- Source: CricketArchive, 8 April 2025

Jamaluddin Syed Mohammed (born 3 June 1983) is an Indian cricketer who plays for Assam as a specialist slow left arm orthodox bowler. He is one who can hit sixes in death overs.
