= Sunny Singh (cricketer) =

Indian cricketer (born 1986)

Personal information
- Full name: Sunny Singh
- Born: December 18, 1986 (age 39); Jind, Haryana, India
- Batting: Right-handed
- Bowling: Right-arm medium
- Role: Batsman

Domestic team information
- Years: Team
- 2003–2015: Haryana
- 2011: Kings XI Punjab
- Source: Cricinfo, 9 May 2025

Sunny Singh (born 18 December 1986 in Jind, Haryana) is an Indian former cricketer. He played for Haryana in the Ranji Trophy. Singh was a right-hand batsman and an occasional medium pacer. Singh was part of the Kings XI Punjab team of the Indian Premier League. He has also played for the India Under-19 cricket team in the 2004 ICC Under-19 Cricket World Cup.

== Career ==
When he was 17, Singh began in first-class cricket with the Haryana cricket team in the 2003–04 Ranji Trophy season. He scored 474 runs from six matches at an average of 52.66. In the following year, he scored 654 runs from seven matches, including three hundreds, at an average of 59.45. Three seasons later, he was dropped from the side. In the 2009–10 season, Singh made 617 runs from 5 matches at an average of 88.14. He also made three centuries and became a permanent member of the team. In 2011, as he led his team to the semi-finals of the Ranji Trophy. There, he made a total of 593 runs from seven matches, including two hundreds, at an average of 45.61.
