= Hiken Shah =

Indian cricketer (born 1984)

Personal information
- Full name: Hiken Naresh Shah
- Born: 15 November 1984 (age 41); Bombay, Maharashtra, India
- Batting: Left-handed
- Bowling: Leg-break
- Role: Batsman

Domestic team information
- Years: Team
- 2006/07–present: Mumbai

Career statistics
Competition	FC	List A	T20
Matches	19	6	6
Runs scored	1194	75	162
Batting average	47.76	15.00	32.40
100s/50s	4/3	0/0	0/1
Top score	156	35	53
Balls bowled	27	–	84
Wickets	1	–	2
Bowling average	18.00	–	51.00
5 wickets in innings	0	–	0
10 wickets in match	0	–	0
Best bowling	1/5	–	1/23
Catches/stumpings	17/1	1/–	1/-
- Source: ESPNcricinfo, 1 December 2012

Hiken Shah (born 15 November 1984) is an Indian cricketer who plays for Mumbai in domestic cricket. He is a left-hand batsman and leg-break bowler.

Shah made his debut for Mumbai in 2006 after consistent performances in inter-university cricket. However, he could not keep his place in the team as the Mumbai middle-order already consisted of big names such as Sachin Tendulkar, Rohit Sharma, Abhishek Nayar and Amol Muzumdar. In 2012, Shah had a great run in the Safi Darashah tournament and the tour game against the visiting England side, due to which he got the No.3 spot in the Mumbai batting order in the Ranji Trophy.

In January 2016, the BCCI handed him a five-year ban for his role in the 2013 Indian Premier League spot-fixing and betting case.
