= Mohammed Mudhasir =

Indian cricketer (born 1988)

Personal information
- Full name: Mohammed Mudhasir Gujree
- Born: 21 October 1988 (age 38); Srinagar, Jammu and Kashmir, India
- Source: ESPNcricinfo, 11 October 2015

Mohammed Mudhasir (born 21 October 1988) is an Indian first-class cricketer who plays for Jammu & Kashmir. He made his List A debut on 27 February 2014, for Jammu and Kashmir in the 2013–14 Vijay Hazare Trophy.

On 28 February 2017, he took the first-ever hat-trick for Jammu & Kashmir in List A cricket, in the Vijay Hazare Trophy match against Chhattisgarh. On 2 November 2018, he took another hat-trick, and four wickets in four balls, in the match against Rajasthan in the 2018–19 Ranji Trophy. He became the first bowler in professional cricket to dismiss four batsmen lbw in four successive deliveries.
