= Abhilash Mallick =

Indian cricketer (born 1991)

Personal information
- Born: 21 November 1991 (age 34); Cuttack, Odisha, India
- Batting: Right-handed
- Bowling: Slow left-arm orthodox

Domestic team information
- Years: Team
- 2011–Current: Odisha

Career statistics
Competition	FC	LA
Matches	21	6
Runs scored	977	112
Batting average	30.53	22.40
100s/50s	1/7	0/1
Top score	126	50
Balls bowled	15	18
Wickets	0	0
Bowling average	–	–
5 wickets in innings	–	–
10 wickets in match	–	–
Best bowling	–	–
Catches/stumpings	6/–	0/–

Abhilash Mallick (born 21 November 1991) is an Indian cricketer. He made his List A debut on 27 February 2014, for Odisha in the 2013–14 Vijay Hazare Trophy. He was the captain of Odisha cricket team for the 2014–15 Ranji Trophy Season. In first class cricket, he played for Odisha in Ranji Trophy.
