= Perumparambath Anthaf =

Indian cricketer (born 1988)

Personal information
- Full name: Perumparambath Ummer Anthaf
- Born: 23 March 1988 (age 38); Punnayurkulam, Kerala, India
- Batting: Right-handed
- Bowling: Right-arm medium-fast
- Role: Bowler

Domestic team information
- Years: Team
- 2010-2015: Kerala
- Source: Cricinfo, 23 October 2015

Perumparambath Anthaf (born 23 March 1988) is an Indian cricketer who played 11 first-class matches for Kerala between 2010 and 2015. He made his first-class debut for Kerala on 8 December 2010 in the 2010-11 Ranji Trophy against Andhra Pradesh.
