= Hardeep Singh (Jammu and Kashmir cricketer) =

Indian cricketer (born 1981)

Personal information
- Born: 13 December 1981 (age 44); Jammu and Kashmir, India
- Source: ESPNcricinfo, 23 October 2015

Hardeep Singh (born 13 December 1981) is an Indian first-class cricketer who plays for Jammu and Kashmir.
