= H. S. Sharath =

Indian cricketer (born 1993)

HS Sharath
Personal information
- Full name: Hosagavi Shivalingaiah Sharath
- Born: 2 June 1993 (age 33); Hosagavi, Mandya, Karnataka, India
- Batting: Right-handed
- Bowling: Right-arm medium-fast
- Role: Bowler

Domestic team information
- Years: Team
- 2012–present: Karnataka

Career statistics
Competition	FC	List A
Matches	19	16
Runs scored	46	5
Batting average	5.11	2.50
100s/50s	1/1	/0
Top score	166	4
Balls bowled	3400	806
Wickets	66	17
Bowling average	24.03	37.17
5 wickets in innings	3	0
10 wickets in match	0	0
Best bowling	5/57	4/40
Catches/stumpings	4/–	4/–
- Source: ESPNcricinfo, 26 December 2013

Hosagavi Shivalingaiah Sharath (born 2 June 1993) is an Indian first-class cricketer who plays for Karnataka in domestic cricket. He is a right-arm medium-fast bowler.

He was a revelation in the 2013-14 Ranji Trophy. His overall figures of 8 for 89 against Mumbai in the league phase helped Karnataka to their first-ever outright victory over the Ranji giants. He claimed 53 wickets from seven matches for his state team in the season and was their second highest wicket-taker in the 2013–14 season.

== Early life ==
Hosagavi Shivalingaiah Sharath commonly known as HS Sharath and H. S. Sharath. He received his education at Jain University, Bangalore.
