= Aditya Waghmode =

Indian cricketer (born 1989)

Personal information
- Full name: Aditya Arvind Waghmode
- Born: 8 November 1989 (age 37); Vadodara, Gujarat, India
- Batting: Left-handed
- Bowling: Right arm off-break
- Role: Opening batsman

Domestic team information
- Years: Team
- 2010/11–present: Baroda

Career statistics
Competition	FC	LA	T20
Matches	17	8	8
Runs scored	1093	169	157
Batting average	40.48	21.12	26.16
100s/50s	2/10	0/0	0/2
Top score	129	47	60
Balls bowled	545	156	12
Wickets	4	2	1
Bowling average	53.25	74.00	9.00
5 wickets in innings	0	0	0
10 wickets in match	0	0	0
Best bowling	1/12	2/44	1/9
Catches/stumpings	12/0	3/–	5/–
- Source: ESPNcricinfo, 12 January 2013

Aditya Arvind Waghmode (born 8 November 1989) is an Indian cricketer who plays for Baroda in domestic cricket. He is a left-hand opening batsman and an off-break bowler. He made his first-class debut against Karnataka in the semi-final of the 2010-11 Ranji Trophy.
