= Natraj Behera =

Indian cricketer (born 1988)

Personal information
- Full name: Natraj Bhuban Behera
- Born: 28 May 1988 (age 38); Rourkela, Odisha, India
- Batting: Right-handed
- Bowling: Right-arm medium
- Role: Batsman

International information
- National side: India

Domestic team information
- Years: Team
- 2009: Kolkata Knight Riders
- 2008–2017: Odisha

Career statistics
Competition	FC	LA	T20
Matches	54	37	16
Runs scored	3,031	967	261
Batting average	34.44	27.62	17.40
100s/50s	8/11	0/7	0/1
Top score	255*	81	73
Balls bowled	262	125	–
Wickets	0	3	–
Bowling average	–	34.33	–
5 wickets in innings	–	0	–
10 wickets in match	–	0	–
Best bowling	–	2/12	–
Catches/stumpings	20/–	14/–	4/–
- Source: ESPNcricinfo, 11 April 2022

Natraj Bhuban Behera (born 28 May 1988) is an Indian cricketer who has captained the Odisha cricket team. Under his leadership, East Zone won its first Duleep Trophy in 2011–12, defeating Central Zone. The following East Zone won the Duleep Trophy for the second time in a row by defeating West Zone. Behera was the captain of Western Samurais Rourkela in Odisha Premier League-1 (OPL-1), the team that won the inaugural OPL edition and led Baitarani side in OPL-2, played in 2013.
