= Anureet Singh =

Indian cricketer (born 1988)

Personal information
- Full name: Anureet Singh
- Born: March 2, 1988 (age 38); India
- Batting: Right-handed
- Bowling: Right-arm medium-fast
- Role: Bowler

Domestic team information
- Years: Team
- 2009: Kolkata Knight Riders
- 2014-2017: Kings XI Punjab
- 2018: Rajasthan Royals
- Source: ESPNcricinfo, 5 May 2025

Anureet Singh (born 2 March 1988) is an Indian cricketer. He is married to Aanchal Kathuria. He is a right-handed batsman and a right-arm medium-fast bowler who plays for Sikkim. He represented the Railways till the 2018–19 season and Baroda in the 2019–20 season.

Singh made his cricketing debut in 2007, playing for Railways Under-22s in the CK Nayudu Trophy, scoring a duck in his debut innings. He played six innings in total in the competition. He returned to the Under-22s team the following year, slotting into a tail end position in the lineup, and thriving, scoring 34 in his first game, and 30 not out in his second.

Singh made his first-class debut in November 2008 against Karnataka, batting as a number eleven and catching centurion Robin Uthappa in the first innings in which he fielded.

He was picked up by Kings XI Punjab in the 2014 Indian Premier League auctions.

In October 2017, he took his fifteenth five-wicket haul in first-class cricket, bowling for Railways against Assam in the 2017–18 Ranji Trophy. He was the leading wicket-taker for Railways in the 2017–18 Ranji Trophy, with 20 dismissals in five matches.

In January 2018, he was bought by the Rajasthan Royals (#44) in the 2018 IPL auction.
