= Jiwanjot Singh =

Indian cricketer (born 1990)

Personal information
- Full name: Jiwanjot Singh
- Born: 6 November 1990 (age 36); Patiala, Punjab, India
- Batting: Right-handed
- Bowling: Right-arm off-break
- Role: Opening batsman

Domestic team information
- Years: Team
- 2012–2019: Punjab
- 2019–2021: Chhattisgarh
- 2022-present: Uttarakhand

Career statistics
Competition	FC	LA	T20
Matches	78	17	6
Runs scored	4712	423	123
Batting average	38.94	24.88	24.60
100s/50s	11/23	0/3	0/1
Top score	238	85	77*
Balls bowled	348	4	–
Wickets	2	1	–
Bowling average	87.00	2.00	–
5 wickets in innings	0	–	–
10 wickets in match	0	–	–
Best bowling	1/13	1/2	–
Catches/stumpings	57/–	5/–	0/–
- Source: ESPNcricinfo, 22 October 2022

Jiwanjot Singh (born 6 November 1990) is a cricketer who plays for Uttarakhand in Indian domestic cricket. He is a right-hand opening batsman.

Singh made his first-class debut during the 2012/13 Ranji Trophy against Hyderabad in November 2012 and scored 213. In the next game against Bengal, he made 158. He continued amassing runs in the subsequent matches and scored an unbeaten 110 on the fourth day against the defending champions Rajasthan to guide his team to a nine-wicket victory. He finished the season with 995 runs from 10 matches with five hundreds and two fifties at an average of 66.33. Later in 2013, he was selected in India A and North Zone squads. He made his List A debut on 1 March 2014, for Punjab in the 2013–14 Vijay Hazare Trophy. He also played for Wickwar CC in the Pratt Cup taking two wickets against North Nibley in June 2022.
