= Rajesh Deshpande =

Indian cricket umpire (born 1961)

Personal information
- Full name: Rajesh Madhukar Deshpande
- Born: 22 October 1961 (age 65)

Umpiring information
- WODIs umpired: 3 (2016)
- FC umpired: 63 (2000–2016)
- LA umpired: 35 (2002–2015)
- T20 umpired: 23 (2007–2016)
- Source: CricketArchive, 30 December 2016

Rajesh Deshpande (born 22 October 1961) is an Indian cricket umpire. He made his debut in first-class cricket as umpire on 19 November 2000 in a Ranji Trophy match between Bihar and Orissa. He has appeared in 7 IPL matches and 59 Ranji Trophy matches.
