= Akshay Darekar =

Indian cricketer (born 1988)

Personal information
- Full name: Akshay Arun Darekar
- Born: 31 July 1988 (age 38); Raigad, Maharashtra, India
- Batting: Left-handed
- Bowling: Slow left-arm orthodox
- Role: Bowler

Domestic team information
- Years: Team
- 2010/11–present: Maharashtra

Career statistics
| Competition | FC | LA | T20 |
|---|---|---|---|
| Matches | 19 | 12 | 10 |
| Runs scored | 314 | 83 | 62 |
| Batting average | 20.93 | 13.83 | 15.50 |
| 100s/50s | 0/0 | 0/0 | 0/0 |
| Top score | 37 | 30 | 19 |
| Balls bowled | 4051 | 642 | 234 |
| Wickets | 66 | 24 | 15 |
| Bowling average | 27.37 | 21.70 | 18.40 |
| 5 wickets in innings | 6 | 1 | 0 |
| 10 wickets in match | 1 | 0 | 0 |
| Best bowling | 8/20 | 5/59 | 3/26 |
| Catches/stumpings | 9/– | 2/– | 3/– |
- Source: ESPNcricinfo, 20 November 2012

Akshay Darekar (born 31 July 1988) is a cricketer who plays for Maharashtra in Indian domestic cricket. He is a slow left-arm orthodox bowler. He also played for India A cricket team in 2012.
