= Ali Murtaza =

Indian cricketer (born 1990)

Personal information
- Full name: Ali Ghulam Murtaza
- Born: 1 January 1990 (age 36); Allahabad, Uttar Pradesh, India
- Batting: Left-handed
- Bowling: Slow left-arm orthodox
- Role: Bowler

Domestic team information
- Years: Team
- 2010–2011: Mumbai Indians
- 2012–2013: Pune Warriors India

Career statistics
Competition	FC	LA	T20
Matches	9	23	20
Runs scored	376	403	99
Batting average	25.06	20.00	33.00
100s/50s	1/1	0/3	0/0
Top score	106	67	39*
Balls bowled	837	774	378
Wickets	19	19	18
Bowling average	21.26	27.31	23.94
5 wickets in innings	1	0	0
10 wickets in match	1	0	0
Best bowling	7/80	3/20	3/9
Catches/stumpings	2/0	3/0	6/0
- Source: ESPNcricinfo, 16 January 2013

Ali Ghulam Murtaza (born 1 January 1990) is an Indian first-class cricketer. He complete his schooling from Bishop Johnson School And College. He plays for Uttar Pradesh. He was a member of Indian World Team in the Indian Cricket League Twenty20 competition. He bowled well in ICL and earned a reputation as a skilled left-arm spinner. In IPL 2010, he was a part of the Mumbai Indians squad which lost to Chennai Super Kings in the final. Since he played in ICL he has a one-year period during which he cannot represent the Indian cricket team. From the 2012 edition of IPL, he played for Pune Warriors India.

His father was cricket coach at Bishop Johnson School & College, Allahabad
