= C. M. Gautam =

Indian cricketer (born 1986)

CM Gautam
Personal information
- Full name: Chidhambaram Muralidharen Gautam
- Born: 8 March 1986 (age 40); Bangalore, Karnataka, India
- Batting: Right-handed
- Role: Wicket-keeper

Domestic team information
- Years: Team
- 2008–2019: Karnataka
- 2013; 2015: Delhi Daredevils (squad no. 5)
- 2014: Mumbai Indians

Career statistics
Competition	FC	LA	T20
Matches	94	58	48
Runs scored	4,716	1,212	511
Batting average	41.36	31.89	17.03
100s/50s	10/24	1/6	0/1
Top score	264*	109*	53*
Catches/stumpings	296/21	62/16	40/14
- Source: ESPNcricinfo, 31 March 2013

Chidhambaram Muralidharen Gautam (born 8 March 1986) is an Indian domestic cricketer. He played for Karnataka cricket team before moving to Goa.

== Domestic career ==
For nearly five seasons Gautam was a fixture in the Karnataka line-up breaking into the team as a batsman before taking over the gloves from the long-serving wicketkeeper Thilak Naidu.

He represented the India Green cricket team in the NKP Salve Challenger Trophy in 2011.

He was the second-highest run-getter of the 2012–13 Ranji Trophy. He was a significant contributor to his team's success that season. Promoted to No. 4 position, he made a total of 943 runs at an average of 117.87, the highest season-tally in Ranji Trophy history by a wicketkeeper. He scored an unbeaten 130 in a high-scoring first-innings shootout against Tamil Nadu followed by a two-hour unbeaten 26 to deny Uttar Pradesh an outright win. He then made a second innings 71 to help beat Delhi after having conceded the first-innings lead, before scoring 250-plus scores against both Vidarbha and Maharashtra. He also had 34 dismissals to his name in 2012-13 Ranji season. He was rewarded by the national selectors with a place in the India A squad for the warm-up match against the touring Australian team in February 2013.

Ahead of the 2019–20 Ranji Trophy, he moved from Karnataka to Goa.

== IPL career ==
He was also part of Royal Challengers Bangalore in IPL 2011 and IPL 2012, but never got a chance to make his IPL debut. His impressive batting was rewarded by the Delhi Daredevils who signed a one-year contract with him in 2013.

Daredevils had the services of two other wicketkeepers in Naman Ojha who has played most often for them and Puneet Bisht as well as the part-time keeping of Kedar Jadhav. Before 2014 IPL, he was bought for Rs. 20 lacs by Mumbai Indians.
