= 2019–20 Ranji Trophy Group A =

Cricket tournament

- The Ranji Trophy, awarded to the winners
- Dates: 9 December 2019 – 15 February 2020
- Administrator(s): BCCI
- Cricket format: First-class cricket
- Tournament format(s): Round-robin
- Host(s): India
- Participants: 9

The 2019–20 Ranji Trophy was the 86th season of the Ranji Trophy, the first-class cricket tournament that took place in India. It was contested by 38 teams, divided into four groups, with nine teams in Group A. The group stage ran from 9 December 2019 to 15 February 2020. The top five teams across Group A and Group B progressed to the quarter-finals of the competition.

Ahead of the final round of group stage matches, Gujarat and Andhra had qualified for the quarter-finals from Group A. Bengal were the third and final team from Group A to progress, after beating Punjab by 48 runs in their final match. Kerala and Hyderabad finished in the last two places across groups A and B and were relegated for the next season.

== Points table ==
| Pos | Team | Pld | W | L | D | T | NR | Pts | Quot |
|---|---|---|---|---|---|---|---|---|---|
| 1 | Gujarat | 8 | 5 | 0 | 3 | 0 | 0 | 35 | 1.235 |
| 2 | Bengal | 8 | 4 | 1 | 3 | 0 | 0 | 32 | 1.470 |
| 5 | Andhra | 8 | 4 | 2 | 2 | 0 | 0 | 27 | 1.175 |
| 6 | Punjab | 8 | 3 | 3 | 2 | 0 | 0 | 24 | 1.280 |
| 7 | Vidarbha | 8 | 2 | 2 | 4 | 0 | 0 | 21 | 1.159 |
| 8 | Delhi | 8 | 2 | 1 | 5 | 0 | 0 | 21 | 1.007 |
| 12 | Rajasthan | 8 | 2 | 4 | 2 | 0 | 0 | 17 | 0.842 |
| 17 | Kerala | 8 | 1 | 5 | 2 | 0 | 0 | 10 | 0.772 |
| 18 | Hyderabad | 8 | 1 | 6 | 1 | 0 | 0 | 7 | 0.509 |

- Top five teams across Groups A and B advance to the knockout stage.
- Bottom two teams across Groups A and B relegated to the Elite Group C for the next season.

== Fixtures ==
=== Round 1 ===
9–12 December 2019
Scorecard

| Kerala | v | Delhi |
| 525/9d (165 overs); Sachin Baby 155 (274); Tejas Baroka 3/128 (30 overs) | | 142 (62.4 overs); Navdeep Saini 25 (42); Jalaj Saxena 6/63 (24 overs) |
| | | 395/4 (104 overs) (f/o); Kunal Chandela 125 (219); Jalaj Saxena 2/119 (41 overs) |

Match drawn
St Xavier's College Ground, Thumba
Umpires: Sai Darshan Kumar and Chirra Ravikanthreddy
Player of the match: Sachin Baby (Kerala)

- Kerala won the toss and elected to bat.
- KM Asif (Kerala) and Tejas Baroka (Delhi) both made their first-class debuts.

9–12 December 2019
Scorecard

| Rajasthan | v | Punjab |
| 257 (79.4 overs); Mahipal Lomror 60 (109); Siddarth Kaul 4/69 (20.4 overs) | | 358 (98.5 overs); Mandeep Singh 122 (174); Shubham Sharma 4/82 (22 overs) |
| 168 (74.5 overs); Mahipal Lomror 43 (112); Sanvir Singh 3/28 (16.4 overs) | | 68/0 (11.4 overs); Shubman Gill 36* (28) |

Punjab won by 10 wickets
Sawai Mansingh Stadium, Jaipur
Umpires: Jayaraman Madanagopal and Pranav Joshi
Player of the match: Mandeep Singh (Punjab)

- Punjab won the toss and elected to field.
- Ashwani Kumar, Sharad Lumba and Anmol Malhotra (Punjab) all made their first-class debuts.

9–12 December 2019
Scorecard

| Andhra | v | Vidarbha |
| 211 (74 overs); Hanuma Vihari 83 (155); Aditya Sarwate 4/50 (18 overs) | | 441 (147.3 overs); Ganesh Satish 237 (397); Cheepurapalli Stephen 5/110 (37 overs) |
| 314/3 (103.4 overs); Srikar Bharat 102* (208); Rajneesh Gurbani 2/63 (22 overs) |

Match drawn
Dr. Gokaraju Liala Gangaaraju ACA Cricket Ground, Vijayawada
Umpires: Rohan Pandit and Puttarangaiah Jayapal
Player of the match: Ganesh Satish (Vidarbha)

- Vidarbha won the toss and elected to field.
- Wasim Jaffer (Vidarbha) became the first cricketer to play in 150 matches in the Ranji Trophy.

9–12 December 2019
Scorecard

| Hyderabad | v | Gujarat |
| 233 (88 overs); Kolla Sumanth 69* (189); Piyush Chawla 3/61 (16 overs) | | 313 (88 overs); Manprit Juneja 94 (145); Mehdi Hasan 4/78 (25 overs) |
| 266 (90.1 overs); Tanmay Agarwal 96 (170); Roosh Kalaria 5/45 (16.1 overs) | | 187/2 (36.4 overs); Priyank Panchal 90 (80); Ravi Kiran 1/12 (5 overs) |

Gujarat won by 8 wickets
Rajiv Gandhi International Cricket Stadium, Hyderabad
Umpires: Abhijit Deshmukh and Pashchim Pathak

- Gujarat won the toss and elected to field.
- Shashidhar Reddy (Hyderabad) made his first-class debut.

=== Round 2 ===
17–20 December 2019
Scorecard

| Vidarbha | v | Rajasthan |
| 510/8d (153.1 overs); Mohit Kale 138 (228); Tanveer Ul-Haq 4/87 (32.1 overs) | | 260 (94.2 overs); Mahipal Lomror 97 (200); Umesh Yadav 5/45 (19.2 overs) |
| | | 190 (77.5 overs) (f/o); Rajesh Bishnoi 58 (103); Aditya Sarwate 4/35 (21.5 overs) |

Vidarbha won by an innings and 60 runs
Vidarbha Cricket Association Ground, Nagpur
Umpires: Mukund Mandale and Jayaraman Madanagopal
Player of the match: Mohit Kale (Vidarbha)

- Vidarbha won the toss and elected to bat.
- Rajat Choudhary (Rajasthan) made his first-class debut.

17–20 December 2019
Scorecard

| Delhi | v | Andhra |
| 215 (70.5 overs); Nitish Rana 51 (51); KV Sasikanth 5/38 (20.1 overs) | | 368 (127 overs); Ricky Bhui 144* (313); Navdeep Saini 5/86 (36 overs) |
| 169 (72.2 overs); Lalit Yadav 55 (145); KV Sasikanth 5/41 (24 overs) | | 20/1 (2.3 overs); Manish Golamaru 15* (7); Simarjeet Singh 1/12 (1.3 overs) |

Andhra won by 9 wickets
CSR Sharma College Ground, Ongole
Umpires: Abhijit Deshmukh and Rohan Pandit

- Andhra won the toss and elected to field.

17–20 December 2019
Scorecard

| Kerala | v | Bengal |
| 239 (84.2 overs); Sanju Samson 116 (182); Ishan Porel 3/56 (19 overs) | | 307 (111.2 overs); Abhishek Raman 110 (240); Sudhesan Midhun 3/51 (18.2 overs) |
| 115 (39.2 overs); Vishnu Vinod 33 (48); Shahbaz Ahmed 3/15 (6.2 overs) | | 50/2 (10.5 overs); Koushik Ghosh 19 (17); Sandeep Warrier 2/23 (4 overs) |

Bengal won by 8 wickets
St Xavier's College Ground, Thumba
Umpires: Akshay Totre and Pashchim Pathak
Player of the match: Abhishek Raman (Bengal)

- Kerala won the toss and elected to bat.
- Sudhesan Midhun (Kerala) made his first-class debut.

17–20 December 2019
Scorecard

| Hyderabad | v | Punjab |
| 242 (81 overs); Himalay Agarwal 68 (132); Gurkeerat Singh Mann 4/34 (11 overs) | | 443/6d (108 overs); Mandeep Singh 204* (301); Mohammed Siraj 4/77 (19 overs) |
| 76 (43.4 overs); Palakodeti Sairam 37 (67); Mayank Markande 5/19 (13.4 overs) |

Punjab won by an innings and 125 runs
Dhruve Pandove Stadium, Patiala
Umpires: Sai Darshan Kumar and Chirra Ravikanthreddy
Player of the match: Mandeep Singh (Punjab)

- Hyderabad won the toss and elected to bat.
- Akul Pandove, Karan Kaila (Punjab) and Yudhvir Singh (Hyderabad) all made their first-class debuts.

=== Round 3 ===
25–28 December 2019
Scorecard

| Gujarat | v | Kerala |
| 127 (38 overs); Kathan Patel 36 (73); Jalaj Saxena 5/26 (13 overs) | | 70 (35.5 overs); Robin Uthappa 26 (67); Roosh Kalaria 4/20 (13 overs) |
| 210 (60.4 overs); Manprit Juneja 53 (93); Basil Thampi 5/56 (14 overs) | | 117 (50.3 overs); Sanju Samson 78 (82); Axar Patel 4/50 (17.3 overs) |

Gujarat won by 90 runs
Lalabhai Contractor Stadium, Surat
Umpires: Sai Darshan Kumar and Chirra Ravikanthreddy
Player of the match: Chintan Gaja (Gujarat)

- Kerala won the toss and elected to field.

25–28 December 2019
Scorecard

| Vidarbha | v | Punjab |
| 338 (118.2 overs); Ganesh Satish 145 (301); Baltej Singh 3/59 (27 overs) | | 408/5 (97.5 overs); Gurkeerat Singh 149 (101); Rajneesh Gurbani 2/62 (16 overs) |

Match drawn
Vidarbha Cricket Association Ground, Nagpur
Umpires: Jayaraman Madanagopal and Anil Chaudhary
Player of the match: Ganesh Satish (Vidarbha)

- Punjab won the toss and elected to field.
- No play was possible on day 2.
- Arshdeep Singh (Punjab) made his first-class debut.

25–28 December 2019
Scorecard

| Bengal | v | Andhra |
| 289 (104 overs); Abhishek Raman 112 (257); KV Sasikanth 4/64 (31 overs) | | 181 (69.2 overs); Chengalpet Gnaneshwar 74* (239); Ishan Porel 4/50 (26.2 overs) |
| 46/0 (21 overs); Abhishek Raman 27* (63) |

Match drawn
Eden Gardens, Kolkata
Umpires: Abhijit Deshmukh and Rohan Pandit
Player of the match: Abhishek Raman (Bengal)

- Andhra won the toss and elected to field.
- Akash Deep (Bengal) made his first-class debut.

25–28 December 2019
Scorecard

| Delhi | v | Hyderabad |
| 284 (71.4 overs); Shikhar Dhawan 140 (207); Ravi Kiran 4/59 (17.3 overs) | | 69 (29 overs); Bavanaka Sandeep 16 (22); Ishant Sharma 4/19 (10 overs) |
| 84/3 (27.5 overs); Dhruv Shorey 32* (63); Ravi Kiran 2/29 (11 overs) | | 298 (70.2 overs) (f/o); Tanmay Agarwal 103 (154); Ishant Sharma 4/89 (19 overs) |

Delhi won by 7 wickets
Arun Jaitley Stadium, Delhi
Umpires: Pashchim Pathak and Sadashiv Iyer
Player of the match: Shikhar Dhawan (Delhi)

- Hyderabad won the toss and elected to field.
- Chaitanya Reddy (Hyderabad) made his first-class debut.

=== Round 4 ===
3–6 January 2020
Scorecard

| Rajasthan | v | Andhra |
| 151 (49.5 overs); Ashok Menaria 74 (94); K. V. Sasikanth 4/50 (16.5 overs) | | 257 (91.5 overs); Chengalpet Gnaneshwar 73 (175); Rituraj Singh 4/36 (26 overs) |
| 257 (106.1 overs); Ashok Menaria 79 (143); K. V. Sasikanth 3/66 (36.1 overs) | | 152/4 (49.5 overs); Hanuma Vihari 52* (107); Aniket Choudhary 2/17 (9 overs) |

Andhra won by 6 wickets
Sawai Mansingh Stadium, Jaipur
Umpires: Jayaraman Madanagopal and Sai Darshan Kumar
Player of the match: KV Sasikanth (Andhra)

- Andhra won the toss and elected to field.
- Yash Kothari (Rajasthan) made his first-class debut.

3–6 January 2020
Scorecard

| Gujarat | v | Bengal |
| 194 (73.3 overs); Samit Gohel 40 (99); Akash Deep 6/60 (18.3 overs) | | 239/5 (65 overs); Ritwik Roy Chowdhury 53* (67); Roosh Kalaria 3/66 (19 overs) |

Match drawn
Eden Gardens, Kolkata
Umpires: Lubabalo Gcuma and VM Dhokre
Player of the match: Akash Deep (Bengal)

- Bengal won the toss and elected to field.
- No play was possible on day 1.
- Ritwik Roy Chowdhury (Bengal) and Tejas Patel (Gujarat) both made their first-class debuts.

3–6 January 2020
Scorecard

| Kerala | v | Hyderabad |
| 164 (51.1 overs); Salman Nizar 37 (43); Ravi Kiran 4/39 (17 overs) | | 228 (76.5 overs); Kolla Sumanth 111* (184); Sandeep Warrier 5/68 (21.5 overs) |
| 218 (86.5 overs); Vishnu Vinod 44 (83); Mohammed Siraj 3/47 (18 overs) | | 155/4 (46 overs); Jamalpur Mallikarjun 38 (70); Sandeep Warrier 1/26 (10 overs); Basil Thampi 1/26 (10 overs) |

Hyderabad won by 6 wickets
Rajiv Gandhi International Cricket Stadium, Hyderabad
Umpires: Abhijit Deshmukh and Rohan Pandit
Player of the match: Kolla Sumanth (Hyderabad)

- Kerala won the toss and elected to bat.
- Jamalpur Mallikarjun and Jaweed Ali (Hyderabad) both made their first-class debuts.
- Kolla Sumanth (Hyderabad) scored his maiden century in first-class cricket.

3–6 January 2020
Scorecard

| Punjab | v | Delhi |
| 313 (99.3 overs); Mandeep Singh 81 (181); Tejas Baroka 3/45 (12.3 overs) | | 339 (115.5 overs); Dhruv Shorey 96 (186); Arshdeep Singh 3/73 (26 overs) |
| 44/4 (13 overs); Gurkeerat Singh Mann 15 (23); Simarjeet Singh 2/21 (6 overs) |

Match drawn
Punjab Cricket Association IS Bindra Stadium, Mohali
Umpires: Pashchim Pathak and Mohamad Rafi
Player of the match: Dhruv Shorey (Delhi)

- Punjab won the toss and elected to bat.

=== Round 5 ===
11–14 January 2020
Scorecard

| Hyderabad | v | Andhra |
| 225 (77.5 overs); Jaweed Ali 98 (161); KV Sasikanth 5/60 (20 overs) | | 489/8d (153 overs); Prasanth Kumar 119 (306); Mehdi Hasan 3/150 (49 overs) |
| 168 (74.4 overs); Ravi Teja 72* (144); Paidikalva Vijaykumar 5/25 (16 overs) |

Andhra won by an innings and 96 runs
CSR Sharma College Ground, Ongole
Umpires: Abhijit Deshmukh and Yeshwant Barde
Player of the match: Paidikalva Vijaykumar (Andhra)

- Andhra won the toss and elected to field.

11–14 January 2020
Scorecard

| Kerala | v | Punjab |
| 227 (75.2 overs); Salman Nizar 91* (157); Baltej Singh 3/33 (11 overs) | | 218 (65.4 overs); Mandeep Singh 71* (143); MD Nidheesh 7/88 (21 overs) |
| 136 (39.5 overs); Akshay Chandran 31 (56); Siddarth Kaul 5/39 (7.5 overs) | | 124 (46.1 overs); Mayank Markande 23 (73); Jalaj Saxena 7/51 (23.1 overs) |

Kerala won by 21 runs
St Xavier's College Ground, Thumba
Umpires: Sai Darshan Kumar and Rohan Pandit
Player of the match: Salman Nizar (Kerala)

- Kerala won the toss and elected to bat.
- Rohan Marwaha (Punjab) made his first-class debut.

11–14 January 2020
Scorecard

| Gujarat | v | Rajasthan |
| 325 (119.4 overs); Samit Gohel 93 (203); Rituraj Singh 5/74 (28.4 overs) | | 360/9d (133.4 overs); Ashok Menaria 119* (185); Arzan Nagwaswalla 4/71 (27.4 overs) |
| 216/1 (56.2 overs); Priyank Panchal 105* (158); Aniket Choudhary 1/20 (8 overs) |

Match drawn
Sawai Mansingh Stadium, Jaipur
Umpires: Ulhas Gandhe and Abhijit Bengeri

- Gujarat won the toss and elected to bat.
- Aditya Garhwal (Rajasthan) made his first-class debut.

11–14 January 2020
Scorecard

| Bengal | v | Vidarbha |
| 170 (56 overs); Manoj Tiwary 48 (80); Akshay Wakhare 5/56 (19 overs) | | 212 (74 overs); Faiz Fazal 51 (98); Arnab Nandi 3/51 (22 overs) |
| 99 (26.1 overs); Anustup Majumdar 29 (45); Aditya Sarwate 6/47 (13 overs) | | 61/1 (13.5 overs); Akshay Karnewar 28* (32); Arnab Nandi 1/16 (7 overs) |

Vidarbha won by 9 wickets
Vidarbha Cricket Association Ground, Nagpur
Umpires: Anil Dandekar and Vineet Kulkarni

- Bengal won the toss and elected to bat.

=== Round 6 ===
19–22 January 2020
Scorecard

| Bengal | v | Hyderabad |
| 635/7d (151.4 overs); Manoj Tiwary 303* (414); Ravi Kiran 3/74 (26 overs) | | 171 (46.3 overs); Jaweed Ali 72 (108); Shahbaz Ahmed 4/26 (8.3 overs) |
| | | 161 (46.2 overs) (f/o); Ravi Teja 53 (86); Akash Deep 4/38 (9 overs) |

Bengal won by an innings and 303 runs
Eden Gardens, Kolkata
Umpires: Abhijit Deshmukh and Rohan Pandit
Player of the match: Manoj Tiwary (Bengal)

- Bengal won the toss and elected to bat.
- Kazi Saifi (Bengal) made his first-class debut.
- Manoj Tiwary (Bengal) scored his maiden triple century in first-class cricket.

19–22 January 2020
Scorecard

| Vidarbha | v | Delhi |
| 179 (61.5 overs); Wasim Jaffer 83 (131); Simarjeet Singh 4/39 (16.5 overs) | | 163 (53.1 overs); Anuj Rawat 37 (101); Aditya Thakare 7/55 (17.1 overs) |
| 330/3d (76.5 overs); Ganesh Satish 100* (92); Lalit Yadav 1/55 (12 overs) | | 348/4 (73 overs); Nitish Rana 105* (68); Akshay Wakhare 1/64 (9 overs) |

Delhi won by 6 wickets
Arun Jaitley Stadium, Delhi
Umpires: Pashchim Pathak and C. K. Nandan
Player of the match: Nitish Rana (Delhi)

- Delhi won the toss and elected to field.

19–22 January 2020
Scorecard

| Gujarat | v | Punjab |
| 281 (90.4 overs); Bhargav Merai 130 (220); Siddarth Kaul 5/58 (22.4 overs) | | 229 (68.2 overs); Anmol Malhotra 119* (180); Arzan Nagwaswalla 5/64 (20 overs) |
| 167 (63.4 overs); Kshitij Patel 57 (137); Arshdeep Singh 3/39 (15.4 overs) | | 109 (33.1 overs); Gurkeerat Singh 34 (22); Arzan Nagwaswalla 5/50 (13.1 overs) |

Gujarat won by 110 runs
Sardar Vallabhai Patel Stadium, Valsad
Umpires: Ulhas Gandhe and Yeshwant Barde
Player of the match: Arzan Nagwaswalla (Gujarat)

- Gujarat won the toss and elected to bat.
- Kshitij Patel and Yash Gardharia (Gujarat) both made their first-class debuts.

19–22 January 2020
Scorecard

| Kerala | v | Rajasthan |
| 90 (44.2 overs); Rohan Prem 18 (83); Shubham Sharma 5/41 (14.2 overs) | | 268 (75.5 overs); Yash Kothari 92 (179); Jalaj Saxena 7/77 (28.5 overs) |
| 82 (31.2 overs); Sachin Baby 18 (49); Shubham Sharma 6/48 (15.2 overs) |

Rajasthan won by an innings and 96 runs
St Xavier's College Ground, Thumba
Umpires: Nitin Pandit and Sundaram Ravi
Player of the match: Shubham Sharma (Rajasthan)

- Kerala won the toss and elected to bat.
- Rohan Kunnummal (Kerala) and Chandrapal Singh (Rajasthan) both made their first-class debuts.

=== Round 7 ===
27–30 January 2020
Scorecard

| Bengal | v | Delhi |
| 318 (98.4 overs); Anustup Majumdar 99 (189); Simarjeet Singh 4/77 (20.4 overs) | | 242/7 (82 overs); Dhruv Shorey 65 (129); Mukesh Kumar 3/75 (25 overs) |

Match drawn
Eden Gardens, Kolkata
Umpires: Chettithody Shamshuddin and Rohan Pandit
Player of the match: Anustup Majumdar (Bengal)

- Delhi won the toss and elected to field.
- Nilkantha Das (Bengal) made his first-class debut.

27–30 January 2020
Scorecard

| Vidarbha | v | Gujarat |
| 142 (49.3 overs); Aniruddha Choudhari 42 (75); Siddharth Desai 4/40 (17 overs) | | 211 (70.2 overs); Parthiv Patel 58 (135); Aditya Thakare 5/43 (20.2 overs) |
| 247 (98.3 overs); Akshay Wadkar 87 (228); Roosh Kalaria 4/62 (29 overs) | | 181/6 (54.2 overs); Parthiv Patel 41* (51); Aditya Thakare 4/44 (20.2 overs) |

Gujarat won by 4 wickets
Lalabhai Contractor Stadium, Surat
Umpires: Krishnamachari Srinivasan and C. K. Nandan
Player of the match: Parthiv Patel (Gujarat)

- Vidarbha won the toss and elected to bat.
- Aniruddha Choudhari (Vidarbha) made his first-class debut.

27–30 January 2020
Scorecard

| Hyderabad | v | Rajasthan |
| 171 (56 overs); Kolla Sumanth 51 (120); Rituraj Singh 3/30 (12 overs) | | 135 (49.4 overs); Ashok Menaria 42 (88); Ravi Kiran 4/46 (16 overs) |
| 156 (53.4 overs); Akshath Reddy 71 (162); Aniket Choudhary 4/48 (20 overs) | | 195/1 (48.5 overs); Manender Singh 107* (147); Ravi Teja 1/45 (9 overs) |

Rajasthan won by 9 wickets
Rajiv Gandhi International Stadium, Hyderabad
Umpires: Sadashiv Iyer and Virender Sharma
Player of the match: Manender Singh (Rajasthan)

- Hyderabad won the toss and elected to bat.

27–30 January 2020
Scorecard

| Kerala | v | Andhra |
| 160 (49.5 overs); Basil Thampi 42 (53); Shoaib Md Khan 5/62 (17.5 overs) | | 255 (111.1 overs); Prasanth Kumar 79 (237); Basil Thampi 3/43 (21.5 overs) |
| 135 (45 overs); Rohan Prem 24 (48); Prithvi Raj 3/26 (9 overs) | | 43/3 (15.1 overs); Jyothi Krishna 15 (33); Jalaj Saxena 2/17 (7.1 overs) |

Andhra won by 7 wickets
CSR Sharma College Ground, Ongole
Umpires: Sai Darshan Kumar and Pashchim Pathak
Player of the match: Mohammad Rafi (Andhra)

- Andhra won the toss and elected to field.
- Mohammad Rafi, Uppara Girinath, Nitish Kumar Reddy (Andhra) and Nedumankuzhy Basil (Kerala) all made their first-class debuts.

=== Round 8 ===
4–7 February 2020
Scorecard

| Delhi | v | Gujarat |
| 293 (101 overs); Kunwar Bidhuri 78 (135); Roosh Kalaria 5/78 (28 overs) | | 335 (85.2 overs); Manprit Juneja 124 (190); Simarjeet Singh 5/75 (22.2 overs) |
| 333/8d (88.5 overs); Anuj Rawat 133 (194); Axar Patel 4/91 (25.5 overs) | | 128/2 (35 overs); Manprit Juneja 51* (65); Siddhant Sharma 2/18 (9 overs) |

Match drawn
Arun Jaitley Stadium, Delhi
Umpires: Jayaraman Madanagopal and Chirra Ravikanthreddy
Player of the match: Manprit Juneja (Gujarat)

- Gujarat won the toss and elected to field.
- Siddhant Sharma (Delhi) made his first-class debut.

4–7 February 2020
Scorecard

| Andhra | v | Punjab |
| 97 (39.4 overs); Bodapati Sumanth 22 (51); Siddarth Kaul 5/24 (9.4 overs) | | 108 (35.2 overs); Mandeep Singh 23 (26); Shoaib Md Khan 5/46 (17.2 overs) |
| 134 (60.4 overs); Ricky Bhui 61 (155); Vinay Choudhary 6/46 (28.4 overs) | | 129/6 (39 overs); Anmol Malhotra 51* (97); Siraparapu Ashish 3/50 (17 overs) |

Punjab won by 4 wickets
Dhruve Pandove Stadium, Patiala
Umpires: Sai Darshan Kumar and Yeshwant Barde
Player of the match: Anmol Malhotra (Punjab)

- Andhra won the toss and elected to bat.
- Krishan Alang (Punjab), Dasari Swaroop Kumar and Siraparapu Ashish (Andhra) all made their first-class debuts.

4–7 February 2020
Scorecard

| Rajasthan | v | Bengal |
| 241 (60 overs); Mahipal Lomror 52 (91); Mukesh Kumar 6/62 (19 overs) | | 123 (52.4 overs); Koushik Ghosh 38 (96); Rituraj Singh 4/30 (18.4 overs) |
| 201 (63.3 overs); Rajesh Bishnoi 46 (49); Nilkantha Das 4/26 (15 overs) | | 320/8 (114 overs); Koushik Ghosh 64 (181); Rituraj Singh 4/97 (35 overs) |

Bengal won by 2 wickets
Sawai Mansingh Stadium, Jaipur
Umpires: Rohan Pandit and Somnath Jha
Player of the match: Shahbaz Ahmed (Bengal)

- Bengal won the toss and elected to field.
- Arafat Khan (Rajasthan) made his first-class debut.

4–7 February 2020
Scorecard

| Vidarbha | v | Kerala |
| 326 (107.4 overs); Darshan Nalkande 66* (65); MD Nidheesh 5/82 (30 overs) | | 191/3 (54 overs); Mohammed Azharuddeen 81 (98); Akshay Wakhare 2/41 (15 overs) |

Match drawn
Vidarbha Cricket Association Stadium, Nagpur
Umpires: Vinod Seshan and Krishnamachari Srinivasan
Player of the match: MD Nidheesh (Kerala)

- Kerala won the toss and elected to field.
- No play was possible on day 3.

=== Round 9 ===
12–15 February 2020
Scorecard

| Andhra | v | Gujarat |
| 177 (84.2 overs); Karan Shinde 49 (104); Arzan Nagwaswalla 4/18 (15.2 overs) | | 406 (109.4 overs); Chirag Gandhi 93 (166); Shoaib Md Khan 4/80 (28.4 overs) |
| 258 (113.4 overs); Karan Shinde 64 (165); Axar Patel 7/92 (44.4 overs) | | 31/2 (9.5 overs); Samit Gohel 20 (29); Mohammad Rafi 2/9 (5 overs) |

Gujarat won by 8 wickets
GS Patel Stadium, Nadiad
Umpires: Jayaraman Madanagopal and Yeshwant Barde
Player of the match: Axar Patel (Gujarat)

- Andhra won the toss and elected to bat.

12–15 February 2020
Scorecard

| Hyderabad | v | Vidarbha |
| 272 (94.5 overs); Prateek Reddy 83 (181); Yash Thakur 4/55 (25 overs) | | 333 (113.4 overs); Faiz Fazal 151 (258); Gangam Anikethreddy 4/61 (23 overs) |
| 244 (75.3 overs); Kolla Sumanth 65* (123); Aditya Sarwate 7/121 (32.3 overs) | | 116/3 (46 overs); Ganesh Satish 47* (127); Ravi Kiran 1/22 (10 overs) |

Match drawn
Rajiv Gandhi International Stadium, Hyderabad
Umpires: K. N. Ananthapadmanabhan and Pashchim Pathak
Player of the match: Faiz Fazal (Vidarbha)

- Vidarbha won the toss and elected to field.
- Prateek Reddy and Gangam Anikethreddy (Hyderabad) both made their first-class debuts.

12–15 February 2020
Scorecard

| Bengal | v | Punjab |
| 138 (49 overs); Manoj Tiwary 73* (108); Vinay Choudhary 6/54 (17 overs) | | 151 (56.5 overs); Rohan Marwaha 48 (134); Shahbaz Ahmed 7/57 (20 overs) |
| 202 (69.3 overs); Manoj Tiwary 65 (119); Krishan Alang 6/53 (23.3 overs) | | 141 (47.3 overs); Ramandeep Singh 69* (104); Shahbaz Ahmed 4/44 (18.3 overs) |

Bengal won by 48 runs
Dhruve Pandove Stadium, Patiala
Umpires: Nikhil Patwardhan and Rohan Pandit
Player of the match: Manoj Tiwary (Bengal)

- Bengal won the toss and elected to bat.
- Ramandeep Singh (Punjab) and Ramesh Prasad (Bengal) both made their first-class debuts.

12–15 February 2020
Scorecard

| Delhi | v | Rajasthan |
| 623 (147 overs); Kunwar Bidhuri 111 (135); Rahul Chahar 5/161 (32 overs) | | 299 (80.2 overs); Ashok Menaria 119 (189); Simarjeet Singh 4/46 (15.2 overs) |
| | | 345/6d (97 overs) (f/o); Mahipal Lomror 118 (219); Shivam Sharma 3/117 (36 overs) |

Match drawn
Arun Jaitley Stadium, Delhi
Umpires: Sai Darshan Kumar and Chirra Ravikanthreddy

- Rajasthan won the toss and elected to field.
- Ramnivas Golada (Rajasthan) made his first-class debut.
