= 2019–20 Hyderabad C.A. season =

Hyderabad C.A.
2019–20 season
- Coach: Arjun Yadav
- Captain: Ambati Rayudu
- Ground(s): Rajiv Gandhi International Cricket Stadium
- Ranji Trophy: 18th Group A&B (relegated)
- Vijay Hazare Trophy: 7th Group A&B
- Syed Mushtaq Ali Trophy: 5th Group C
- Most runs: FC: Kolla Sumanth (448); LA: Tanmay Agarwal (279); T20: Bavanaka Sandeep (261)
- Most wickets: FC: Ravi Kiran (26); LA: Bavanaka Sandeep (14); T20: Mohammed Siraj (13)

The 2019–20 season is Hyderabad cricket team's 86th competitive season. The Hyderabad cricket team is senior men's domestic cricket team based in the city of Hyderabad, India, run by the Hyderabad Cricket Association (HCA). They represent the state of Telangana in domestic competitions.

The season was second in charge for the head coach and former player, Arjun Yadav. Ambati Rayudu came out of retirement to take the charge as the captain for the Vijay Hazare Trophy and Syed Mushtaq Ali Trophy while Tanmay Agarwal captained the side for the first time during the Ranji Trophy.

== Squad ==
The following players made at least one appearance for Hyderabad in first-class, List A or Twenty20 cricket in 2019–20 season. Age given is at the start of Hyderabad's first match of the season (28 September 2019).
Players with international caps are listed in bold.

Name	Birth date	Batting style	Bowling style	Notes
Batsmen
Himalay Agarwal	9 October 1993 (aged 25)	Right-handed	Right-arm medium-fast	
Tanmay Agarwal	3 May 1995 (aged 24)	Left-handed	Right-arm leg break	**First Class Captain**
Jaweed Ali	15 December 1993 (aged 25)	Right-handed	Right-arm off break	**First Class** debut against Kerala (3 January 2020)
Rahul Buddhi	20 September 1997 (aged 22)	Left-handed	Right-arm off break	**First Class** debut against Bengal (19 January 2020)
**Ambati Rayudu**	23 September 1985 (aged 34)	Right-handed	Right-arm leg break	**List A and Twenty20 Captain**; Played for **Chennai Super Kings** in 2020 Indian Premier League
Rohit Rayudu	29 July 1994 (aged 25)	Left-handed	Right-arm off break	
Akshath Reddy	11 February 1991 (aged 28)	Right-handed	Right-arm leg break	Played for **India Green** in 2019-20 Duleep Trophy
Chaitanya Reddy	15 October 1995 (aged 23)	Left-handed	Right-arm off break	**First Class** debut against Delhi (25 December 2019)
Shashidhar Reddy	7 October 1995 (aged 23)	Left-handed	Right-arm off break	**First Class** debut against Gujarat (9 December 2019); **Twenty20** debut against Arunachal Pradesh (15 November 2019)
Tilak Varma	8 November 2002 (aged 16)	Left-handed	Right-arm off break	**List A** debut against Saurashtra (28 September 2019)
All-rounders
Palakodeti Sairam	24 January 1993 (aged 26)	Right-handed	Right-arm off break	
Bavanaka Sandeep	25 April 1992 (aged 27)	Left-handed	Slow left-arm orthodox	Played for **Sunrisers Hyderabad** in 2020 Indian Premier League
Ravi Teja	19 October 1994 (aged 24)	Left-handed	Right-arm medium-fast	
Tanay Thyagarajan	15 November 1995 (aged 23)	Left-handed	Slow left-arm orthodox	
Wicket-keepers
Jamalpur Mallikarjun	14 October 1993 (aged 25)	Right-handed	—	**First Class** debut against Kerala (3 January 2020); **List A** debut against Saurashtra (28 September 2019)
Prateek Reddy	28 November 2000 (aged 18)	Right-handed	—	**First Class** debut against Vidarbha (12 February 2020)
Kolla Sumanth	24 April 1992 (aged 27)	Right-handed	—	
Bowlers
Gangam Anikethreddy	28 October 2000 (aged 18)	Right-handed	Slow left-arm orthodox	**First Class** debut against Vidarbha (12 February 2020)
Akash Bhandari	10 June 1993 (aged 26)	Right-handed	Right-arm leg break	
Ajay Dev Goud	15 February 2000 (aged 19)	Right-handed	Right-arm medium-fast	**List A** debut against Saurashtra (28 September 2019); **Twenty20** debut against Arunachal Pradesh (15 November 2019)
Mehdi Hasan	3 February 1990 (aged 29)	Left-handed	Slow left-arm orthodox	
Ravi Kiran	16 March 1991 (aged 28)	Right-handed	Right-arm medium-fast	
Chama Milind	4 September 1994 (aged 25)	Left-handed	Left-arm medium-fast	
Yudhvir Singh	13 September 1997 (aged 22)	Right-handed	Right-arm medium-fast	**First Class** debut against Punjab (17 December 2019); **Twenty20** debut against Chandigarh (12 November 2019)
**Mohammed Siraj**	13 March 1994 (aged 25)	Right-handed	Right-arm medium-fast	Played for **India B** in 2019-20 Deodhar Trophy; Played for **Royal Challengers Bangalore** in 2020 Indian Premier League

== Competitions ==
=== Overview ===
Competition	Format	Pld	W	L	D / T / NR	Win %	Final position
Vijay Hazare Trophy	List A cricket	8	4	3	1	50%	Group stage
Syed Mushtaq Ali Trophy	Twenty20 cricket	7	4	3	0	57.14%	Group stage
Ranji Trophy	First-class cricket	8	1	6	1	12.50%	Relegated to Group C

=== Vijay Hazare Trophy ===
The Vijay Hazare Trophy, a List A cricket tournament in India, fixtures were announced by the Board of Control for Cricket in India (BCCI) on 14 September 2019 and the Hyderabad was placed in the Group A with all the group fixtures to be played in Bengaluru. The team was selected on 14 September with Ambati Rayudu, who came out of retirement recently, appointed as the captain. Earlier, Rayudu announced retirement from all forms of game following his non-selection to the Indian squad for the 2019 World Cup. The matches originally scheduled on the first three days got mostly washed out due to the unseasonal rains across the India. Overall, 17 of the 30 matches got washed out during this time which forced the BCCI rejig the schedule to accommodate the abandoned matches and to avoid the rains for the future matches.

==== Points table ====
Group A

Pos	Team	Pld	W	L	T	NR	Pts	NRR
1	Karnataka	8	7	1	0	0	28	1.170
4	Chhattisgarh	8	5	2	0	1	22	0.066
5	Mumbai	8	4	2	0	2	20	0.832
7	Hyderabad	8	4	3	0	1	18	0.734
8	Jharkhand	8	4	4	0	0	16	−0.231
9	Kerala	8	4	4	0	0	16	0.435
15	Saurashtra	8	3	5	0	0	12	−0.648
17	Andhra	8	1	6	0	1	6	−1.122
18	Goa	8	1	6	0	1	6	−1.616

- Top five teams across Groups A and B advanced to the knockout stage.
- Bottom two teams across Groups A and B relegated to the Elite Group C for the next season.

Points system : W = 4, T/NR = 2, L = 0.

==== Matches ====
Group stage

28 September 2019	Hyderabad; 252/5 (50 overs)	v	Saurashtra; 131 (39.1 overs)	Hyderabad won by 121 runs
09:00 IST Round 1 Scorecard	Hyderabad; 252/5 (50 overs)	v	Saurashtra; 131 (39.1 overs)	Three Ovals KSCA Stadium, Alur; Umpires: Vineet Kulkarni and Abhijit Deshmukh
09:00 IST Round 1 Scorecard	Tanmay Agarwal 79 (98); Jaydev Unadkat 2/46 (10 overs)		Sheldon Jackson 39 (53); Bavanaka Sandeep 5/26 (9.1 overs)	Three Ovals KSCA Stadium, Alur; Umpires: Vineet Kulkarni and Abhijit Deshmukh
Saurashtra won the toss and elected to field; Tilak Varma, Jamalpur Mallikarjun and Ajay Dev Goud (Hyderabad) made their List-A debuts.				Three Ovals KSCA Stadium, Alur; Umpires: Vineet Kulkarni and Abhijit Deshmukh

29 September 2019	Kerala; 227/9 (50 overs)	v	Hyderabad; 165 (44.4 overs)	Kerala won by 62 runs
09:00 IST Round 2 Scorecard	Kerala; 227/9 (50 overs)	v	Hyderabad; 165 (44.4 overs)	Three Ovals KSCA Stadium, Alur; Umpires: Nitin Pandit and Vineet Kulkarni
09:00 IST Round 2 Scorecard	Sanju Samson 36 (44); Ajay Dev Goud 3/52 (9 overs)		Tanmay Agarwal 69 (103); KM Asif 4/34 (10 overs)	Three Ovals KSCA Stadium, Alur; Umpires: Nitin Pandit and Vineet Kulkarni
Hyderabad won the toss and elected to field.; Ponnam Rahul (Kerala) made his List A debut.				Three Ovals KSCA Stadium, Alur; Umpires: Nitin Pandit and Vineet Kulkarni

1 October 2019	Hyderabad; 198/9 (50 overs)	v	Karnataka; 177 (45.2 overs)	Hyderabad won by 21 runs
09:00 IST Round 3 Scorecard	Hyderabad; 198/9 (50 overs)	v	Karnataka; 177 (45.2 overs)	Three Ovals KSCA Stadium, Alur; Umpires: Nitin Pandit and Virender Sharma
09:00 IST Round 3 Scorecard	Ambati Rayudu 87* (111); Ronit More 2/31 (8 overs)		Devdutt Padikkal 60 (104); Bavanaka Sandeep 4/35 (9 overs)	Three Ovals KSCA Stadium, Alur; Umpires: Nitin Pandit and Virender Sharma
Karnataka won the toss and elected to field.				Three Ovals KSCA Stadium, Alur; Umpires: Nitin Pandit and Virender Sharma

4 October 2019	Hyderabad	v	Mumbai	Match abandoned
09:00 IST Round 4 Scorecard	Hyderabad	v	Mumbai	Three Ovals KSCA Stadium, Alur; Umpires: Abhijit Deshmukh and Virender Sharma
No toss.; No play was possible due to a wet outfield.				Three Ovals KSCA Stadium, Alur; Umpires: Abhijit Deshmukh and Virender Sharma

5 October 2019	Hyderabad; 192/7 (34 overs)	v	Jharkhand; 193/4 (33.4 overs)	Jharkhand won by 6 wickets
09:00 IST Round 5 Scorecard	Hyderabad; 192/7 (34 overs)	v	Jharkhand; 193/4 (33.4 overs)	Just Cricket Academy Ground, Bengaluru; Umpires: Ulhas Gandhe and Nitin Menon
09:00 IST Round 5 Scorecard	Ambati Rayudu 69 (54); Anukul Roy 2/30 (6 overs)		Saurabh Tiwary 61* (47); Chama Milind 2/25 (7 overs)	Just Cricket Academy Ground, Bengaluru; Umpires: Ulhas Gandhe and Nitin Menon
Hyderabad won the toss and elected to bat.; The match was reduced to 34 overs per side due to a wet outfield.				Just Cricket Academy Ground, Bengaluru; Umpires: Ulhas Gandhe and Nitin Menon

7 October 2019	Goa; 122 (37.4 overs)	v	Hyderabad; 126/5 (22.2 overs)	Hyderabad won by 5 wickets
09:00 IST Round 6 Scorecard	Goa; 122 (37.4 overs)	v	Hyderabad; 126/5 (22.2 overs)	Three Ovals KSCA Stadium, Alur; Umpires: Abhijit Deshmukh and Nitin Menon
09:00 IST Round 6 Scorecard	Amogh Sunil Desai 55 (87); Mohammed Siraj 4/20 (9 overs)		Tanmay Agarwal 66* (71); Heramb Parab 1/21 (6 overs)	Three Ovals KSCA Stadium, Alur; Umpires: Abhijit Deshmukh and Nitin Menon
Goa won the toss and elected to bat.				Three Ovals KSCA Stadium, Alur; Umpires: Abhijit Deshmukh and Nitin Menon

10 October 2019	Hyderabad; 171/7 (20 overs)	v	Andhra; 164/6 (20 overs)	Hyderabad won by 7 runs
09:00 IST Round 7 Scorecard	Hyderabad; 171/7 (20 overs)	v	Andhra; 164/6 (20 overs)	Three Ovals KSCA Stadium, Alur; Umpires: Nitin Pandit and Nitin Menon
09:00 IST Round 7 Scorecard	Tilak Varma 83 (59); Prithvi Raj 2/36 (4 overs)		Ricky Bhui 58 (40); Chama Milind 3/39 (4 overs)	Three Ovals KSCA Stadium, Alur; Umpires: Nitin Pandit and Nitin Menon
Hyderabad won the toss and elected to bat.; The match was reduced to 20 overs per side due to a wet outfield.				Three Ovals KSCA Stadium, Alur; Umpires: Nitin Pandit and Nitin Menon

14 October 2019	Chhattisgarh; 171/5 (23 overs)	v	Hyderabad; 147 (19.5 overs)	Chhattisgarh won by 24 runs
09:00 IST Round 8 Scorecard	Chhattisgarh; 171/5 (23 overs)	v	Hyderabad; 147 (19.5 overs)	Three Ovals KSCA Stadium, Alur; Umpires: Ulhas Gandhe and Vineet Kulkarni
09:00 IST Round 8 Scorecard	Ashutosh Singh 66 (50); Chama Milind 2/46 (5 overs)		Tilak Varma 41 (37); Pratap Singh 4/23 (3.5 overs)	Three Ovals KSCA Stadium, Alur; Umpires: Ulhas Gandhe and Vineet Kulkarni
Chhattisgarh won the toss and elected to bat.; The match was reduced to 23 overs per side due to a wet outfield.				Three Ovals KSCA Stadium, Alur; Umpires: Ulhas Gandhe and Vineet Kulkarni

=== Syed Mushtaq Ali Trophy ===
==== Points table ====
Group C

Team	Pld	W	L	T	NR	Pts	NRR
Maharashtra	7	5	2	0	0	20	+0.510
Punjab	7	4	3	0	0	16	+1.026
Chandigarh	7	4	3	0	0	16	+0.701
Chhattisgarh	7	4	3	0	0	16	+0.686
Hyderabad	7	4	3	0	0	16	–0.255
Railways	7	4	3	0	0	16	–0.872
Himachal Pradesh	7	3	4	0	0	12	+0.564
Arunachal Pradesh	7	0	7	0	0	0	–2.685

- Top two teams advanced to the Super League

Points system : W = 4, T/NR = 2, L = 0.

==== Matches ====
Group stage

8 November 2019	Hyderabad; 149/7 (20 overs)	v	Punjab; 97/4 (14 overs)	Hyderabad won by 2 runs (VJD method)
Round 1 Scorecard	Hyderabad; 149/7 (20 overs)	v	Punjab; 97/4 (14 overs)	Government Model Senior Secondary School, Chandigarh; Umpires: Ulhas Gandhe and K. N. Ananthapadmanabhan
Round 1 Scorecard	Akshath Reddy 47 (27); Siddarth Kaul 3/44 (4 overs)		Shubman Gill 48 (42); Mehdi Hasan 1/11 (3 overs)	Government Model Senior Secondary School, Chandigarh; Umpires: Ulhas Gandhe and K. N. Ananthapadmanabhan
Punjab won the toss and elected to field.; Punjab's innings was reduced to 14 overs and their target revised to 100 due to a wet outfield.				Government Model Senior Secondary School, Chandigarh; Umpires: Ulhas Gandhe and K. N. Ananthapadmanabhan

9 November 2019	Hyderabad; 183/3 (20 overs)	v	Railways; 184/6 (20 overs)	Railways won by 4 wickets
Round 2 Scorecard	Hyderabad; 183/3 (20 overs)	v	Railways; 184/6 (20 overs)	Government Model Senior Secondary School, Chandigarh; Umpires: Ulhas Gandhe and K. N. Ananthapadmanabhan
Round 2 Scorecard	Ambati Rayudu 77 (51); Harsh Tyagi 1/29 (3 overs)		Mohammed Ahmed 40* (29); Mehdi Hasan 3/29 (4 overs)	Government Model Senior Secondary School, Chandigarh; Umpires: Ulhas Gandhe and K. N. Ananthapadmanabhan
Railways won the toss and elected to field.				Government Model Senior Secondary School, Chandigarh; Umpires: Ulhas Gandhe and K. N. Ananthapadmanabhan

11 November 2019	Himachal Pradesh; 183/5 (20 overs)	v	Hyderabad; 99 (19 overs)	Himachal Pradesh won by 84 runs
Round 3 Scorecard	Himachal Pradesh; 183/5 (20 overs)	v	Hyderabad; 99 (19 overs)	Sector 16 Stadium, Chandigarh; Umpires: K. N. Ananthapadmanabhan and Abhijit Deshmukh
Round 3 Scorecard	Ekant Sen 38 (32); Mohammed Siraj 2/31 (4 overs)		Himalay Agarwal 21 (27); Rishi Dhawan 3/18 (4 overs)	Sector 16 Stadium, Chandigarh; Umpires: K. N. Ananthapadmanabhan and Abhijit Deshmukh
Hyderabad won the toss and elected to field.				Sector 16 Stadium, Chandigarh; Umpires: K. N. Ananthapadmanabhan and Abhijit Deshmukh

12 November 2019	Chandigarh; 123 (19.5 overs)	v	Hyderabad; 126/5 (19 overs)	Hyderabad won by 5 wickets
Round 4 Scorecard	Chandigarh; 123 (19.5 overs)	v	Hyderabad; 126/5 (19 overs)	Government Model Senior Secondary School, Chandigarh; Umpires: K. N. Ananthapadmanabhan and Abhijit Deshmukh
Round 4 Scorecard	Bipul Sharma 35 (27); Mohammed Siraj 3/15 (3.5 overs)		Bavanaka Sandeep 32* (39); Jaskaran Singh 2/17 (4 overs)	Government Model Senior Secondary School, Chandigarh; Umpires: K. N. Ananthapadmanabhan and Abhijit Deshmukh
Chandigarh won the toss and elected to bat.; Yudhvir Singh (Hyderabad) made his T20 debut.				Government Model Senior Secondary School, Chandigarh; Umpires: K. N. Ananthapadmanabhan and Abhijit Deshmukh

14 November 2019	Hyderabad; 163/6 (20 overs)	v	Maharashtra; 164/4 (19.5 overs)	Maharashtra won by 6 wickets
Round 5 Scorecard	Hyderabad; 163/6 (20 overs)	v	Maharashtra; 164/4 (19.5 overs)	Government Model Senior Secondary School, Chandigarh; Umpires: Ulhas Gandhe and K. N. Ananthapadmanabhan
Round 5 Scorecard	Bavanaka Sandeep 55* (31); Satyajeet Bachhav 2/22 (4 overs)		Kedar Jadhav 68 (40); Mohammed Siraj 3/37 (3.5 overs)	Government Model Senior Secondary School, Chandigarh; Umpires: Ulhas Gandhe and K. N. Ananthapadmanabhan
Maharashtra won the toss and elected to field.				Government Model Senior Secondary School, Chandigarh; Umpires: Ulhas Gandhe and K. N. Ananthapadmanabhan

15 November 2019	Arunachal Pradesh; 125/6 (20 overs)	v	Hyderabad; 131/4 (18.1 overs)	Hyderabad won by 6 wickets
Round 6 Scorecard	Arunachal Pradesh; 125/6 (20 overs)	v	Hyderabad; 131/4 (18.1 overs)	Sector 16 Stadium, Chandigarh; Umpires: K. N. Ananthapadmanabhan and Abhijit Deshmukh
Round 6 Scorecard	Uvais Ahmad 72* (38); Ajay Dev Goud 4/15 (4 overs)		Tanmay Agarwal 52 (40); Kemo Bam 2/22 (3.1 overs)	Sector 16 Stadium, Chandigarh; Umpires: K. N. Ananthapadmanabhan and Abhijit Deshmukh
Hyderabad won the toss and elected to field.; Suraj Tayam, Karkir Taye (Arunachal Pradesh), Shashidhar Reddy and Ajay Dev Goud (Hyderabad) all made their T20 debuts.				Sector 16 Stadium, Chandigarh; Umpires: K. N. Ananthapadmanabhan and Abhijit Deshmukh

14 November 2019	Hyderabad; 174/3 (20 overs)	v	Chhattisgarh; 153/9 (20 overs)	Hyderabad won by 21 runs
Round 7 Scorecard	Hyderabad; 174/3 (20 overs)	v	Chhattisgarh; 153/9 (20 overs)	Sector 16 Stadium, Chandigarh; Umpires: Ulhas Gandhe and K. N. Ananthapadmanabhan
Round 7 Scorecard	Tanmay Agarwal 90* (61); Veer Pratap Singh 2/38 (4 overs)		Harpreet Singh Bhatia 62 (42); Mehdi Hasan 2/13 (3 overs)	Sector 16 Stadium, Chandigarh; Umpires: Ulhas Gandhe and K. N. Ananthapadmanabhan
Hyderabad won the toss and elected to bat.				Sector 16 Stadium, Chandigarh; Umpires: Ulhas Gandhe and K. N. Ananthapadmanabhan

=== Ranji Trophy ===
==== Points table ====
Group A

Pos	Team	Pld	W	L	D	T	NR	Pts	Quot
1	Gujarat	8	5	0	3	0	0	35	1.235
2	Bengal	8	4	1	3	0	0	32	1.470
5	Andhra	8	4	2	2	0	0	27	1.175
6	Punjab	8	3	3	2	0	0	24	1.280
7	Vidarbha	8	2	2	4	0	0	21	1.159
8	Delhi	8	2	1	5	0	0	21	1.007
12	Rajasthan	8	2	4	2	0	0	17	0.842
17	Kerala	8	1	5	2	0	0	10	0.772
18	Hyderabad	8	1	6	1	0	0	7	0.509

- Top five teams across Groups A and B advance to the knockout stage.
- Bottom two teams across Groups A and B relegated to the Elite Group C for the next season.

Points system : Win by an innings or 10 wickets = 7, Win = 6, Draw with first innings lead = 3, Draw with first innings deficit = 1, No Result = 1, Loss = 0.

==== Matches ====
Group stage

9–12 December 2019	(home team) Hyderabad	v	Gujarat	Gujarat won by 8 wickets
Round 1 Scorecard	233 (88 overs); Kolla Sumanth 69* (189); Piyush Chawla 3/61 (16 overs)		313 (88 overs); Manpreet Juneja 94 (145); Mehdi Hasan 4/78 (25 overs)	Rajiv Gandhi International Cricket Stadium, Hyderabad; Umpires: Abhijit Deshmukh and Pashchim Pathak; Player of the match: Roosh Kalaria (Gujarat)
Round 1 Scorecard	266 (90.1 overs); Tanmay Agarwal 96 (170); Roosh Kalaria 5/45 (16.1 overs)		187/2 (36.4 overs); Priyank Panchal 90 (80); Ravi Kiran 1/12 (5 overs)	Rajiv Gandhi International Cricket Stadium, Hyderabad; Umpires: Abhijit Deshmukh and Pashchim Pathak; Player of the match: Roosh Kalaria (Gujarat)
Gujarat won the toss and elected to field.; Shashidhar Reddy (Hyderabad) made his first-class debut.

17–20 December 2019	Hyderabad	v	Punjab (home team)	Punjab won by an innings and 125 runs
Round 2 Scorecard	242 (81 overs); Kolla Sumanth 79 (145); Gurkeerat Singh Mann 4/34 (11 overs)		443/6d (108 overs); Mandeep Singh 204* (301); Mohammed Siraj 4/77 (19 overs)	Dhruve Pandove Stadium, Patiala; Umpires: Sai Darshan Kumar and Chirra Ravikanthreddy; Player of the match: Mandeep Singh (Punjab)
Round 2 Scorecard	76 (43.4 overs); Palakodeti Sairam 37 (67); Mayank Markande 5/19 (13.4 overs)			Dhruve Pandove Stadium, Patiala; Umpires: Sai Darshan Kumar and Chirra Ravikanthreddy; Player of the match: Mandeep Singh (Punjab)
Hyderabad won the toss and elected to bat.; Akul Pandove, Karan Kaila (Punjab) and Yudhvir Singh (Hyderabad) all made their first-class debuts.

25–28 December 2019	Hyderabad	v	Delhi (home team)	Delhi won by 7 wickets
Round 3 Scorecard	284 (71.4 overs); Shikhar Dhawan 140 (207); Ravi Kiran 4/59 (17.3 overs)		69 (29 overs); Bavanaka Sandeep 16 (22); Ishant Sharma 4/19 (10 overs)	Arun Jaitley Stadium, Delhi; Umpires: Pashchim Pathak and Sadashiv Iyer; Player of the match: Shikhar Dhawan (Delhi)
Round 3 Scorecard	84/3 (27.5 overs); Dhruv Shorey 32* (63); Ravi Kiran 2/29 (11 overs)		298 (70.2 overs) (f/o); Tanmay Agarwal 103 (154); Ishant Sharma 4/89 (19 overs)	Arun Jaitley Stadium, Delhi; Umpires: Pashchim Pathak and Sadashiv Iyer; Player of the match: Shikhar Dhawan (Delhi)
Hyderabad won the toss and elected to field.; Chaitanya Reddy (Hyderabad) made his first-class debut.

3–6 January 2020	Kerala	v	Hyderabad (home team)	Hyderabad won by 6 wickets
Round 4 Scorecard	164 (51.1 overs); Salman Nizar 37 (43); Ravi Kiran 4/39 (17 overs)		228 (76.5 overs); Kolla Sumanth 111* (184); Sandeep Warrier 5/68 (21.5 overs)	Rajiv Gandhi International Cricket Stadium, Hyderabad; Umpires: Abhijit Deshmukh and Rohan Pandit; Player of the match: Kolla Sumanth (Hyderabad)
Round 4 Scorecard	218 (86.5 overs); Vishnu Vinod 44 (83); Mohammed Siraj 3/47 (18 overs)		155/4 (46 overs); Jamalpur Mallikarjun 38 (70); Basil Thampi 1/24 (10 overs)	Rajiv Gandhi International Cricket Stadium, Hyderabad; Umpires: Abhijit Deshmukh and Rohan Pandit; Player of the match: Kolla Sumanth (Hyderabad)
Kerala won the toss and elected to bat; Jamalpur Mallikarjun and Jaweed Ali (Hyderabad) both made their first-class debuts.

11–14 January 2020	Hyderabad	v	Andhra (home team)	Andhra won by an innings and 96 runs
Round 5 Scorecard	225 (77.5 overs); Jaweed Ali 98 (161); K. V. Sasikanth 5/60 (20 overs)		489/8d (153 overs); Prasanth Kumar 119 (306); Mehdi Hasan 3/150 (49 overs)	CSR Sharma College Ground, Ongole; Umpires: Abhijit Deshmukh and Yeshwant Barde; Player of the match: Paidikalva Vijaykumar (Andhra)
Round 5 Scorecard	168 (74.4 overs); Ravi Teja 72* (144); Paidikalva Vijaykumar 5/25 (16 overs)			CSR Sharma College Ground, Ongole; Umpires: Abhijit Deshmukh and Yeshwant Barde; Player of the match: Paidikalva Vijaykumar (Andhra)
Andhra won the toss and elected to field.

19–22 January 2020	(home team) Bengal	v	Hyderabad	Bengal won by an innings and 303 runs
Round 6 Scorecard	635/7d (151.4 overs); Manoj Tiwary 303* (414); Ravi Kiran 3/74 (26 overs)		171 (46.3 overs); Jaweed Ali 72 (108); Shahbaz Ahmed 4/26 (8.3 overs)	Eden Gardens, Kolkata; Umpires: Abhijit Deshmukh and Rohan Pandit; Player of the match: Manoj Tiwary (Bengal)
Round 6 Scorecard			161 (46.2 overs) (f/o); Ravi Teja 53 (86); Akash Deep 4/38 (9 overs)	Eden Gardens, Kolkata; Umpires: Abhijit Deshmukh and Rohan Pandit; Player of the match: Manoj Tiwary (Bengal)
Bengal won the toss and elected to bat.; Kazi Saifi (Bengal) and Rahul Buddhi (Hyderabad) both made their first-class debuts.

27–30 January 2020	(home team) Hyderabad	v	Rajasthan	Rajasthan won by 9 wickets
Round 7 Scorecard	171 (81 overs); Kolla Sumanth 51 (120); Rituraj Singh 3/34 (16 overs)		135 (49.4 overs); Ashok Menaria 42 (88); Ravi Kiran 4/46 (16 overs)	Rajiv Gandhi International Cricket Stadium, Hyderabad; Umpires: Sadashiv Iyer and Virender Sharma; Player of the match: Manender Singh (Rajasthan)
Round 7 Scorecard	101/6 (35.3 overs); Akshath Reddy 71 (162); Aniket Choudhary 4/48 (20 overs)		195/1 (48.5 overs); Manender Singh 107* (147); Ravi Teja 1/45 (9 overs)	Rajiv Gandhi International Cricket Stadium, Hyderabad; Umpires: Sadashiv Iyer and Virender Sharma; Player of the match: Manender Singh (Rajasthan)
Hyderabad won the toss and elected to bat.

12–15 February 2020	(home team) Hyderabad	v	Vidarbha	Match drawn
Round 8 Scorecard	272 (94.5 overs); Prateek Reddy 83 (181); Yash Thakur 4/55 (25 overs)		333 (113.4 overs); Faiz Fazal 151 (258); Gangam Anikethreddy 4/61 (23 overs)	Rajiv Gandhi International Cricket Stadium, Hyderabad; Umpires: K. N. Ananthapadmanabhan and Pashchim Pathak; Player of the match: Faiz Fazal (Vidarbha)
Round 8 Scorecard	244 (75.3 overs); Kolla Sumanth 65* (123); Aditya Sarwate 7/121 (32.3 overs)		116/3 (46 overs); Ganesh Satish 47* (127); Ravi Kiran 1/22 (10 overs)	Rajiv Gandhi International Cricket Stadium, Hyderabad; Umpires: K. N. Ananthapadmanabhan and Pashchim Pathak; Player of the match: Faiz Fazal (Vidarbha)
Vidarbha won the toss and elected to field.; Prateek Reddy and Gangam Anikethreddy (Hyderabad) both made their first-class debuts.

== Player statistics ==
=== Batting ===
Player	First class							List A							Twenty20							
Player	Matches	Innings	Runs	Highest score	Average	100s	50s	Matches	Innings	Runs	Highest score	Average	100s	50s	Matches	Innings	Runs	Highest score	Average	Strike rate	100s	50s
Batsmen
Himalay Agarwal	6	12	174	68	15.81	0	1	3	3	16	11	8.00	0	0	6	5	70	34	14.00	88.60	0	0
Tanmay Agarwal	8	16	374	103	23.37	1	1	7	7	279	79	46.50	0	3	7	7	254	90*	42.33	126.36	0	2
Jaweed Ali	4	8	210	98	26.25	0	2															
Rahul Buddhi	2	4	102	52	25.25	0	1															
Ambati Rayudu								7	7	233	87*	38.83	0	2	7	7	174	77	29.00	124.28	0	1
Rohit Rayudu								5	5	59	20	11.80	0	0								
Akshath Reddy	8	16	268	71	16.75	0	1	7	7	66	25	9.42	0	0	6	6	89	47	14.83	123.61	0	0
Chaitanya Reddy	1	2	3	3	1.50	0	0															
Shashidhar Reddy	2	4	23	10	5.75	0	0								1	1	4	4	4.00	57.14	0	0
Tilak Varma								6	6	213	83	35.50	0	2	1	1	0	0	0.00	0.00	0	0
All-rounders
Palakodeti Sairam	4	7	120	37	24.00	0	0	1	–	–	–	–	–	–								
Bavanaka Sandeep	5	10	183	41	18.30	0	0	7	7	136	39	22.66	0	0	7	7	261	74*	87.00	141.84	0	2
Ravi Teja	5	10	257	72*	32.12	0	2								4	4	17	9	5.66	113.33	0	0
Tanay Thyagarajan	3	6	66	34	11.00	0	0															
Wicket-keepers
Jamalpur Mallikarjun	2	4	52	38	13.00	0	0	7	6	70	30	17.50	0	0	5	3	58	23*	29.00	111.53	0	0
Prateek Reddy	1	2	109	83	54.50	0	1															
Kolla Sumanth	8	15	448	111*	37.33	1	4															
Bowlers
Gangam Anikethreddy	1	2	5	4	2.50	0	0															
Akash Bhandari															6	2	14	11	14.00	100.00	0	0
Ajay Dev Goud								4	2	1	1*	1.00	0	0	2	–	–	–	–	–	–	–
Mehdi Hasan	8	15	212	71*	17.66	0	1	7	3	8	6*	4.00	0	0	7	1	0	0	0.00	0.00	0	0
Ravi Kiran	7	13	77	19	7.70	0	0	2	1	0	0*	–	0	0	1	1	1	1*	–	20.00	0	0
Chama Milind	6	12	132	47	11.00	0	0	7	6	88	36	17.60	0	0	7	3	33	23*	33.00	137.50	0	0
Yudhvir Singh	2	4	36	31*	12.00	0	0								3	1	7	7	7.00	233.33	0	0
Mohammad Siraj	5	9	118	46	16.85	0	0	7	4	23	19	7.66	0	0	7	1	12	12	12.00	70.58	0	0
Source: ESPNcricinfo

=== Bowling ===
Player	First class								List A							Twenty20						
Player	Matches	Overs	Wickets	Average	BBI	BBM	5wi	10wm	Matches	Overs	Wickets	Average	Economy	BBI	5wi	Matches	Overs	Wickets	Average	Economy	BBI	4wi
Gangam Anikethreddy	1	35.0	4	21.00	4/61	4/84	0	0														
Akash Bhandari																6	15.0	2	59.50	7.93	1/11	0
Rahul Buddhi	2	0.4	0	–	–	–	0	0														
Ajay Dev Goud									4	27.0	4	33.00	4.88	3/52	0	2	7.0	5	9.00	6.42	4/15	1
Mehdi Hasan	8	247.4	16	48.81	4/78	5/143	0	0	7	47.4	4	48.00	4.02	2/38	0	7	26.0	10	16.70	6.42	3/23	0
Ravi Kiran	7	203.0	26	20.73	4/39	6/88	0	0	2	9.0	3	22.33	7.44	2/41	0	1	3.0	0	–	12.33	–	0
Chama Milind	6	133.5	10	42.50	3/66	3/93	0	0	7	45.2	12	20.58	5.44	3/39	0	7	25.0	7	26.28	7.36	2/14	0
Rohit Rayudu									5	17.0	3	24.66	4.35	1/14	0							
Chaitanya Reddy	1	1.0	0	–	–	–	0	0														
Palakodeti Sairam	4	76.0	6	54.50	2/9	3/59	0	0	1	5.0	0	–	6.60	–	0							
Bavanaka Sandeep	5	16.0	0	–	–	–	0	0	7	39.5	14	12.14	4.26	5/26	1	7	8.0	1	69.00	8.62	1/12	0
Yudhvir Singh	2	36.0	2	66.00	1/60	1/60	0	0								3	12.0	2	53.50	8.91	2/37	0
Mohammad Siraj	5	144.1	19	26.94	4/59	7/106	0	0	7	53.0	12	17.00	3.84	4/20	0	7	26.4	13	13.53	6.60	3/15	0
Ravi Teja	5	93.0	5	71.40	1/22	2/53	0	0								4	11.0	1	10.3.00	9.36	1/22	0
Tanay Thyagarajan	3	46.4	0	–	–	–	0	0														
Tilak Varma									6	5.0	1	37.00	7.40	1/19	0							
Source: ESPNcricinfo

=== Fielding ===
Player	First class			List A			Twenty20		
Player	Matches	Catches	Stumpings	Matches	Catches	Stumpings	Matches	Catches	Stumpings
Himalay Agarwal	6	1	0	3	1	0	6	1	0
Tanmay Agarwal	8	6	0	7	5	0	7	3	0
Jaweed Ali	4	3	0						
Gangam Anikethreddy	1	2	0						
Akash Bhandari							6	3	0
Ajay Dev Goud				4	1	0			
Mehdi Hasan	8	2	0	7	1	0	7	2	0
Jamalpur Mallikarjun	2	2	0	7	14	0	5	2	1
Chama Milind				7	1	0	7	1	0
Ambati Rayudu							7	3	0
Rohit Rayudu				5	1	0			
Akshath Reddy	8	5	0	7	1	0			
Shashidhar Reddy	2	1	0						
Palakodeti Sairam	4	1	0						
Bavanaka Sandeep				7	3	0	7	4	0
Yudhvir Singh							3	4	0
Mohammad Siraj	5	2	0	7	1	0	7	1	0
Kolla Sumanth	8	25	1						
Ravi Teja							4	2	0
Tanay Thyagarajan	3	4	0						
Tilak Varma				6	4	0			
Source: ESPNcricinfo
