= 2019–20 Syed Mushtaq Ali Trophy Group C =

Cricket tournament

- Dates: 8 – 18 November 2019
- Administrator(s): BCCI
- Cricket format: Twenty20 cricket
- Tournament format(s): Round-robin
- Participants: 8

The 2019–20 Syed Mushtaq Ali Trophy was the eleventh season of the Syed Mushtaq Ali Trophy, a Twenty20 cricket tournament in India. It was contested by 38 teams, divided into five groups, with eight teams in Group C. The group stage started on 8 November 2019. The top two teams from Group C progressed to the Super League section of the competition. Following the conclusion of matches played on 17 November 2019, six of the eight teams in Group C were level on points, all on 16 points each. After the final day of group stage matches, Maharashtra and Punjab had progressed to the Super League stage of the tournament.

== Points table ==
Team	Pld	W	L	T	NR	Pts	NRR
Maharashtra	7	5	2	0	0	20	+0.510
Punjab	7	4	3	0	0	16	+1.026
Chandigarh	7	4	3	0	0	16	+0.701
Chhattisgarh	7	4	3	0	0	16	+0.686
Hyderabad	7	4	3	0	0	16	–0.255
Railways	7	4	3	0	0	16	–0.872
Himachal Pradesh	7	3	4	0	0	12	+0.564
Arunachal Pradesh	7	0	7	0	0	0	–2.685

- Top two teams advanced to the Super League

== Fixtures ==
=== Round 1 ===
8 November 2019
Scorecard

Arunachal Pradesh; 47/4 (6 overs)	v	Chhattisgarh; 52/1 (4.5 overs)
Rahul Dalal 19* (14); Pankaj Rao 1/6 (1 over)		Shashank Chandrakar 32* (17); Myendung Singpho 1/4 (1 over)

Chhattisgarh won by 9 wickets
Sector 16 Stadium, Chandigarh
Umpires: Abhijit Deshmukh and Krishnamachari Srinivasan

- Chhattisgarh won the toss and elected to field.
- The match was reduced to 6 overs per side due to rain.
- Uvais Ahmad, Shashwat Kohli, Myendung Singpho, Yab Niya and Kengo Bam (Arunachal Pradesh) all made their T20 debuts.

8 November 2019
Scorecard

Hyderabad; 149/7 (20 overs)	v	Punjab; 97/4 (14 overs)
Akshath Reddy 47 (27); Siddarth Kaul 3/44 (4 overs)		Shubman Gill 48 (42); Mehdi Hasan 1/11 (3 overs)

Hyderabad won by 2 runs (VJD method)
Government Model Senior Secondary School, Chandigarh
Umpires: Ulhas Gandhe and K. N. Ananthapadmanabhan

- Punjab won the toss and elected to field.
- Rain during Punjab's innings prevented any further play.

8 November 2019
Scorecard

Chandigarh; 167/5 (20 overs)	v	Himachal Pradesh; 84/4 (11.3 overs)
Shivam Bhambri 106 (57); Pankaj Jaswal 2/40 (4 overs)		Prashant Chopra 40 (31); Gurinder Singh 2/13 (2.3 overs)

Chandigarh won by 9 runs (VJD method)
Sector 16 Stadium, Chandigarh
Umpires: Abhijit Deshmukh and Krishnamachari Srinivasan

- Chandigarh won the toss and elected to bat.
- Rain during Himachal Pradesh's innings prevented any further play.
- Shivam Bhambri and Gaurav Puri (Chandigarh) both made their T20 debuts.
- Shivam Bhambri also scored his first century in a Twenty20 match.

8 November 2019
Scorecard

Maharashtra; 104/6 (15 overs)	v	Railways; 96/8 (15 overs)
Azim Kazi 44 (28); Krishnakant Upadhyay 3/12 (3 overs)		Harsh Tyagi 28* (21); Mukesh Choudhary 2/10 (3 overs)

Maharashtra won by 8 runs
Government Model Senior Secondary School, Chandigarh
Umpires: Ulhas Gandhe and K. N. Ananthapadmanabhan

- Railways won the toss and elected to field.
- The match was reduced to 15 overs per side due to rain.
- Mukesh Choudhary (Maharashtra), Dinesh Mor, Mohammed Ahmed, Kushal Kakad and Himanshu Sangwan (Railways) all made their T20 debuts.

=== Round 2 ===
9 November 2019
Scorecard

Arunachal Pradesh; 47/7 (8 overs)	v	Punjab; 50/0 (4 overs)
Uvais Ahmad 12 (11); Baltej Singh 3/11 (2 overs)		Shubman Gill 24* (14)

Punjab won by 10 wickets
Sector 16 Stadium, Chandigarh
Umpires: Abhijit Deshmukh and Krishnamachari Srinivasan

- Punjab won the toss and elected to field.
- The match was reduced to 8 overs per side due to rain.

9 November 2019
Scorecard

Himachal Pradesh; 123/8 (20 overs)	v	Chhattisgarh; 124/2 (18.1 overs)
Nitin Sharma 35* (22); Ajay Mandal 3/18 (4 overs)		Veer Pratap Singh 61* (50); Ayush Jamwal 2/11 (4 overs)

Chhattisgarh won by 8 wickets
Government Model Senior Secondary School, Chandigarh
Umpires: Ulhas Gandhe and K. N. Ananthapadmanabhan

- Chhattisgarh won the toss and elected to field.

9 November 2019
Scorecard

Maharashtra; 162/8 (20 overs)	v	Chandigarh; 163/3 (17.5 overs)
Naushad Shaikh 50* (34); Shresth Nirmohi 2/18 (4 overs)		Manan Vohra 75* (52); Rahul Tripathi 1/12 (1 over)

Chandigarh won by 7 wickets
Sector 16 Stadium, Chandigarh
Umpires: Abhijit Deshmukh and Krishnamachari Srinivasan

- Maharashtra won the toss and elected to bat.

9 November 2019
Scorecard

Hyderabad; 183/3 (20 overs)	v	Railways; 184/6 (20 overs)
Ambati Rayudu 77 (51); Harsh Tyagi 1/29 (3 overs)		Mohammed Ahmed 40* (29); Mehdi Hasan 3/29 (4 overs)

Railways won by 4 wickets
Government Model Senior Secondary School, Chandigarh
Umpires: Ulhas Gandhe and K. N. Ananthapadmanabhan

- Railways won the toss and elected to field.

=== Round 3 ===
11 November 2019
Scorecard

Chhattisgarh; 190/6 (20 overs)	v	Railways; 123 (20 overs)
Shashank Chandrakar 82 (50); Karthik Raman 3/33 (3 overs)		Dinesh Mor 35 (32); Shashank Singh 4/22 (4 overs)

Chhattisgarh won by 72 runs
Government Model Senior Secondary School, Chandigarh
Umpires: Ulhas Gandhe and Krishnamachari Srinivasan

- Railways won the toss and elected to field.
- Vikrant Rajput (Railways) made his T20 debut.

11 November 2019
Scorecard

Himachal Pradesh; 183/5 (20 overs)	v	Hyderabad; 99 (19 overs)
Ekant Sen 38 (32); Mohammed Siraj 2/31 (4 overs)		Himalay Agarwal 21 (27); Rishi Dhawan 3/18 (4 overs)

Himachal Pradesh won by 84 runs
Sector 16 Stadium, Chandigarh
Umpires: K. N. Ananthapadmanabhan and Abhijit Deshmukh

- Hyderabad won the toss and elected to field.

11 November 2019
Scorecard

Arunachal Pradesh; 148/6 (20 overs)	v	Maharashtra; 154/2 (14.2 overs)
Uvais Ahmad 70 (38); Mukesh Choudhary 3/32 (4 overs)		Ruturaj Gaikwad 81 (41); Yab Niya 1/20 (2 overs)

Maharashtra won by 8 wickets
Government Model Senior Secondary School, Chandigarh
Umpires: Ulhas Gandhe and Krishnamachari Srinivasan

- Maharashtra won the toss and elected to field.

11 November 2019
Scorecard

Chandigarh; 131/5 (20 overs)	v	Punjab; 132/3 (16.3 overs)
Shivam Bhambri 41 (30); Mayank Markande 3/26 (4 overs)		Abhishek Sharma 60* (47); Gurinder Singh 2/34 (4 overs)

Punjab won by 7 wickets
Sector 16 Stadium, Chandigarh
Umpires: K. N. Ananthapadmanabhan and Abhijit Deshmukh

- Chandigarh won the toss and elected to bat.
- Gaurav Gambhir (Chandigarh) made his T20 debut.

=== Round 4 ===
12 November 2019
Scorecard

Arunachal Pradesh; 161/5 (20 overs)	v	Railways; 165/3 (19.2 overs)
Rahul Dalal 75 (42); Karthik Raman 3/37 (4 overs)		Mrunal Devdhar 66 (47); Akhilesh Sahani 2/25 (4 overs)

Railways won by 7 wickets
Sector 16 Stadium, Chandigarh
Umpires: Ulhas Gandhe and Krishnamachari Srinivasan

- Arunachal Pradesh won the toss and elected to bat.
- Nabam Tempol (Arunachal Pradesh) made his T20 debut.

12 November 2019
Scorecard

Chhattisgarh; 201/3 (20 overs)	v	Maharashtra; 167 (20 overs)
Harpreet Singh 88* (46); Satyajeet Bachhav 1/26 (4 overs)		Ruturaj Gaikwad 61 (41); Ajay Mandal 3/19 (3 overs)

Chhattisgarh won by 34 runs
Government Model Senior Secondary School, Chandigarh
Umpires: K. N. Ananthapadmanabhan and Abhijit Deshmukh

- Maharashtra won the toss and elected to field.
- Digvijay Deshmukh (Maharashtra) made his T20 debut.

12 November 2019
Scorecard

Chandigarh; 123 (19.5 overs)	v	Hyderabad; 126/5 (19 overs)
Bipul Sharma 35 (27); Mohammed Siraj 3/15 (3.5 overs)		Bavanaka Sandeep 32* (39); Jaskaran Singh 2/17 (4 overs)

Hyderabad won by 5 wickets
Government Model Senior Secondary School, Chandigarh
Umpires: K. N. Ananthapadmanabhan and Abhijit Deshmukh

- Chandigarh won the toss and elected to bat.
- Yudhvir Singh (Hyderabad) made his T20 debut.

12 November 2019
Scorecard

Himachal Pradesh; 87/9 (20 overs)	v	Punjab; 90/2 (9.3 overs)
Prashant Chopra 46* (55); Sandeep Sharma 4/8 (4 overs)		Simran Singh 57* (32); Pankaj Jaswal 1/26 (2 overs)

Punjab won by 8 wickets
Sector 16 Stadium, Chandigarh
Umpires: Ulhas Gandhe and Krishnamachari Srinivasan

- Himachal Pradesh won the toss and elected to bat.

=== Round 5 ===
14 November 2019
Scorecard

Chhattisgarh; 161/6 (20 overs)	v	Chandigarh; 164/4 (19 overs)
Vishal Kushwah 60* (29); Jaskaran Singh 3/31 (4 overs)		Bipul Sharma 62* (33); Sumit Ruikar 2/14 (4 overs)

Chandigarh won by 6 wickets
Sector 16 Stadium, Chandigarh
Umpires: Abhijit Deshmukh and Krishnamachari Srinivasan

- Chandigarh won the toss and elected to field.
- Anirudh Kanwar (Chandigarh) made his T20 debut.

14 November 2019
Scorecard

Railways; 167/8 (20 overs)	v	Punjab; 162/7 (20 overs)
Mrunal Devdhar 37 (32); Siddarth Kaul 4/19 (4 overs)		Anmolpreet Singh 84 (56); Karthik Raman 3/40 (4 overs)

Railways won by 5 runs
Government Model Senior Secondary School, Chandigarh
Umpires: Ulhas Gandhe and K. N. Ananthapadmanabhan

- Punjab won the toss and elected to field.

14 November 2019
Scorecard

Arunachal Pradesh; 118/6 (20 overs)	v	Himachal Pradesh; 119/4 (14.2 overs)
Rahul Dalal 62 (45); Pankaj Jaswal 4/18 (4 overs)		Ekant Sen 51* (30); Akhilesh Sahani 2/33 (4 overs)

Himachal Pradesh won by 6 wickets
Sector 16 Stadium, Chandigarh
Umpires: Abhijit Deshmukh and Krishnamachari Srinivasan

- Arunachal Pradesh won the toss and elected to bat.

14 November 2019
Scorecard

Hyderabad; 163/6 (20 overs)	v	Maharashtra; 164/4 (19.5 overs)
Bavanaka Sandeep 55* (31); Satyajeet Bachhav 2/22 (4 overs)		Kedar Jadhav 68 (40); Mohammed Siraj 3/37 (3.5 overs)

Maharashtra won by 6 wickets
Government Model Senior Secondary School, Chandigarh
Umpires: Ulhas Gandhe and K. N. Ananthapadmanabhan

- Maharashtra won the toss and elected to field.

=== Round 6 ===
15 November 2019
Scorecard

Arunachal Pradesh; 125/6 (20 overs)	v	Hyderabad; 131/4 (18.1 overs)
Uvais Ahmad 72* (38); Ajay Dev Goud 4/15 (4 overs)		Tanmay Agarwal 52 (40); Kengo Bam 2/22 (3.1 overs)

Hyderabad won by 6 wickets
Sector 16 Stadium, Chandigarh
Umpires: K. N. Ananthapadmanabhan and Abhijit Deshmukh

- Hyderabad won the toss and elected to field.
- Suraj Tayam, Karkir Taye (Arunachal Pradesh), Shashidhar Reddy and Ajay Dev Goud (Hyderabad) all made their T20 debuts.

15 November 2019
Scorecard

Punjab; 169/8 (20 overs)	v	Chhattisgarh; 150/9 (20 overs)
Anmolpreet Singh 78 (51); Puneet Datey 3/33 (4 overs)		Harpreet Singh 47 (41); Harpreet Brar 3/31 (4 overs)

Punjab won by 19 runs
Government Model Senior Secondary School, Chandigarh
Umpires: Ulhas Gandhe and Krishnamachari Srinivasan

- Chhattisgarh won the toss and elected to field.

15 November 2019
Scorecard

Railways; 196/5 (20 overs)	v	Chandigarh; 195/6 (20 overs)
Pratham Singh 67 (47); Bipul Sharma 1/33 (3 overs); Gurinder Singh 1/33 (3 overs)		Ankit Kaushik 74* (37); Harsh Tyagi 1/20 (4 overs)

Railways won by 1 run
Government Model Senior Secondary School, Chandigarh
Umpires: Ulhas Gandhe and Krishnamachari Srinivasan

- Chandigarh won the toss and elected to field.

15 November 2019
Scorecard

Himachal Pradesh; 135/8 (20 overs)	v	Maharashtra; 138/2 (19 overs)
Prashant Chopra 28 (22); Shamshuzama Kazi 2/22 (4 overs)		Ruturaj Gaikwad 82* (61); Pankaj Jaswal 1/26 (3 overs)

Maharashtra won by 8 wickets
Sector 16 Stadium, Chandigarh
Umpires: K. N. Ananthapadmanabhan and Abhijit Deshmukh

- Himachal Pradesh won the toss and elected to bat.

=== Round 7 ===
17 November 2019
Scorecard

Arunachal Pradesh; 106/9 (20 overs)	v	Chandigarh; 108/0 (9.1 overs)
Uvais Ahmad 27 (20); Jaskaran Singh 4/25 (4 overs)		Manan Vohra 68* (32)

Chandigarh won by 10 wickets
Sector 16 Stadium, Chandigarh
Umpires: Ulhas Gandhe and K. N. Ananthapadmanabhan

- Arunachal Pradesh won the toss and elected to bat.
- Kunal Mahajan (Chandigarh) made his T20 debut.

17 November 2019
Scorecard

Hyderabad; 174/3 (20 overs)	v	Chhattisgarh; 153/9 (20 overs)
Tanmay Agarwal 90* (61); Veer Pratap Singh 2/38 (4 overs)		Harpreet Singh Bhatia 62 (42); Mehdi Hasan 2/13 (3 overs)

Hyderabad won by 21 runs
Sector 16 Stadium, Chandigarh
Umpires: Ulhas Gandhe and K. N. Ananthapadmanabhan

- Hyderabad won the toss and elected to bat.

18 November 2019
Scorecard

Maharashtra; 201/4 (20 overs)	v	Punjab; 156/7 (20 overs)
Azim Kazi 71* (36); Siddarth Kaul 2/31 (4 overs)		Mandeep Singh 67 (49); Digvijay Deshmukh 3/34 (4 overs)

Maharashtra won by 45 runs
Sector 16 Stadium, Chandigarh
Umpires: Abhijit Deshmukh and Krishnamachari Srinivasan

- Punjab won the toss and elected to field.

18 November 2019
Scorecard

Himachal Pradesh; 193/4 (20 overs)	v	Railways; 139/9 (20 overs)
Nitin Sharma 76 (51); Krishnakant Upadhyay 1/25 (4 overs)		Mrunal Devdhar 26 (15); Rishi Dhawan 3/24 (4 overs)

Himachal Pradesh won by 54 runs
Sector 16 Stadium, Chandigarh
Umpires: Abhijit Deshmukh and Krishnamachari Srinivasan

- Himachal Pradesh won the toss and elected to bat.
- Akash Vasisht (Himachal Pradesh) made his T20 debut.
