= Ritwik =

Ritwik, Ritwick, Rithvik or Ritvik may refer to

- Ritwik (given name), an Indian male given name
- Ritwik (theatre group), a theatre group in West Bengal, India
- Kattappanayile Rithwik Roshan, a 2016 Indian Malayalam-language film
- Ritvik Holdings, a Canadian children's toy company
  - Kirkbi AG v Ritvik Holdings Inc, a 2005 decision of the Supreme Court of Canada
