= Muhammad Rafique =

Muhammad Rafique may refer to:

- Muhammad Rafique (politician, born 1941), Pakistani politician who was a Member of the Provincial Assembly of the Punjab
- Muhammad Rafique (politician, born 1960), Pakistani politician who was a Member of the Provincial Assembly of Sindh
- Muhammad Rafique (mathematician) (1940-1996), Pakistani mathematician

== See also ==
- Mohammad Rafiq (disambiguation)
- Mohammed Rafi (1924–1980), Indian singer
- Mohammed Rafi (footballer) (born 1982), Indian footballer
- Mohammad Rafi (cricketer) (born 1998), Indian cricketer
- Mohammed Rafi Sauda (1713–1781), Indian Urdu poet
