= Centre for High Energy Physics =

National laboratory at the University of Punjab

- Official Logo
- Motto: CHEPIAN
- Established: 1 November 1982; 44 years ago
- Research type: Scientific research, education, and energy technologies
- Budget: Federally funded
- Field of research: Fundamental science; Particle physics; Supercomputing; Physical science
- Director: Prof. Dr. Bilal Masood
- Location: Lahore, Punjab, Pakistan
- Colors: Maroon and Light Blue
- Operating agency: University of Punjab
- Website: pu.edu.pk

The Centre for High Energy Physics (CHEP) is a federally funded national research laboratory managed by the University of Punjab.

The CHEP is dedicated towards the scientific advancement and understanding of high energy physics (or particle physics) — a branch of fundamental physics that is concerned with unraveling the ultimate constituents of matter and with elucidating the forces between them.

The site was established in 1982 with efforts by Punjab University with federal funding to support research activities in quantum sciences that started in 1968, and later engaged in the supercomputing that started in 2004.

== Overview ==
The Centre for High Energy Physics (CHEP) was established by the eminent researcher, Dr. Mohammad Saleem, from the federal funding in November 1982. The University of Punjab in Lahore had been engaged in research output in physics in 1968 but the scope was limited to its physics department. CHEP's initial focused was focused and directed towards the advancement of particle physics but began conducting research on supercomputing when it started its teaching program in computational physics in 2004.

CHEP takes participation in Beijing Spectrometer-III (BSE-III) in China and currently hosts a 2.5 GeV linear particle accelerator.

=== Logo, building and research output ===
The CHEP's official logo shows a book as a sign of knowledge, and an Arabic verse from the Holy Qur'ann which translates to: "Why don't you think?". On the top of the logo is the CHEP's spelled name and at the bottom is the name of the Punjab University.

The CHEP is located in the campus jurisdiction of the University of Punjab, and has a two-story building with its own library (other than the university main library), seven computer labs: a programming, modeling, and simulation lab, a supercomputer lab. CHEP certifies Punjab University's degree criteria for bachelor, master's, and doctoral programs in computational sciences while master's and doctoral programs in high-energy physics. In 2015, CHEP supported the publication of a textbook on high-energy physics authored by Mohammad Saleem and Dr. Muhammad Rafique.

The CHEP also has an international collaboration with Michoacan University in Mexico, University of Pittsburgh and Texas Tech University in the United States, Hamburg University in Germany, and Teikyo University in Japan.

== Research and Collaborations ==
Since its establishment in 1982, the Centre has expanded from a primarily theoretical physics unit to include experimental and computational high-energy physics. CHEP researchers participate in the BESIII experiment at the Beijing Electron–Positron Collider and in linear accelerator (LINAC) research at the Institute of High Energy Physics (IHEP), Beijing. The Centre has also developed dedicated computational facilities, including computer simulation and modeling laboratories that support particle physics and accelerator research.

In addition to international collaborations, CHEP maintains academic programs at the Master's, M.Phil, and doctoral levels, and regularly publishes in peer-reviewed journals in high-energy and particle physics. The Centre also organizes workshops and conferences to support research training and outreach within Pakistan.

== Leadership ==
The Centre is currently directed by Dr. Qadeer Afzal Malik. Previous directors have included founding faculty members from the Department of Physics, University of the Punjab.

== See also ==
- University of the Punjab
- Ministry of Energy
