= Mohammad Rafiq =

Mohammad Rafiq or Rafique may refer to:

- Muhammad Rafiq (brigadier) (fl. 1950s), Pakistani Commandant
- Mohammad Rafiq (judge) (born 1960), Indian Judge and the Chief Justice of Himachal Pradesh High Court
- Muhammad Rafiq Tarar (born 1929), Pakistani judge and then president
- Mohammed Rafique Mughal (born 1936), Pakistani archaeologist
- Mohammad Rafiq (poet) (born 1943), winner of the Bangla Academy Awards in 1987
- Mohammed Rafik Khatri (born 1970), Indian Master craftsman
- Mohammad Rafique (cricketer) (born 1970), Bangladeshi cricketer
- Mohammed Rafique (footballer) (born 1992), Indian footballer
- Mohammad Rafiq (born 1954), retired Pakistani Air Force officer known for overpowering the attacker of Bærum mosque shooting
- Mohd Rafiq Naizamohideen (born 1986), Malaysian politician

== See also ==
- Muhammad Rafique (disambiguation)
- Mohammed Rafi (1924–1980), Indian singer
- Mohammed Rafi (footballer) (born 1982), Indian footballer
- Mohammad Rafi (cricketer) (born 1998), Indian cricketer
- Mohammed Rafi Sauda (1713–1781), Indian Urdu poet
