= Uvais =

Uvais is both a given name and a surname. Notable people with the name include:

- Uvais II, Jalayirid ruler
- Uvais Ahmad (born 1999), Indian cricketer
- Uvais Karnain (born 1962), Sri Lankan cricketer
- Uvais Mohamed Imitiyas, Sri Lankan politician
- Muhammad Uvais (born 1998), Indian footballer
