= Ramesh Prasad =

Ramesh Prasad may refer to:

- Akkineni Ramesh Prasad, Indian businessman, film producer and film executive
- Ramesh Prasad (cricketer), Indian cricketer
- Prof. Ramesh Prasad, Professor of Pali & Theravada, Sampurnanand Sanskrit University, Varanasi
