= Koushik Ghosh =

Koushik Ghosh may refer to:

- Koushik Ghosh (cricketer)
- Koushik Ghosh, Bengali-Canadian electronic musician known professionally simply as Koushik
