= Akul =

- Akul Balaji Indian actor
- Akul Pandove Indian cricketer
