= Rituraj Singh =

Rituraj Singh may refer to:

- Rituraj Singh (cricketer)
- Rituraj Singh (actor)
