= Government Model Senior Secondary School =

Government Model Senior Secondary School can refer to:

- Government Model Senior Secondary School, Sector-16, Chandigarh
- Government Model Senior Secondary School Junga
