= Mohammad Saleem =

Mohammad Saleem may refer to:

- Mohammad Yunus Saleem (1912–2004), Indian politician, scholar and lawyer
- Mohammad Saleem (physicist) (1934–2016), Pakistani particle physicist
- Mohammad Saleem (cricketer) (born 2002), Afghan cricketer
- Mohammed Saleem, Indian environmental activist
- Muhammad Saleem (footballer) (born 1942), Pakistani footballer
