= Ritwik (given name) =

Ritwik, Ritwick, Rithvik or Ritvik is a Hindu masculine given name from the Indian subcontinent. In Sanskrit, the word ṛtvik is the nominative case of the noun ṛtvij "seasonal sacrificer". The female form of the name is Ritwija, from Sanskrit ṛtvijā. The name may refer to the following notable people:

- Ritvik Arora (born 1997), Indian television actor
- Ritwik Bhattacharya (born 1979), Indian squash player
- Ritwik Bhowmik (born 1992), Indian web-series actor
- Ritwick Chakraborty (born 1977), a Bengali film actor
- Ritwik Das (born 1996), Indian football midfielder
- Rithvik Dhanjani (born 1988), Indian television actor
- Ritwik Ghatak (1925–1976), Indian Bengali filmmaker and script writer
- Ritwik Roy Chowdhury (born 1995), Indian cricketer
- Ritwik Sanyal (born 1953), Indian classical singer
