= Kushal Kakad =

Indian cricketer (born 1995)

Personal information
- Born: 18 April 1995 (age 31); Akola, Maharashtra
- Source: ESPNcricinfo, 8 November 2019

Kushal Kakad (born 18 April 1995) is an Indian cricketer. He made his Twenty20 debut on 8 November 2019, for Railways in the 2019–20 Syed Mushtaq Ali Trophy.
