= Yab Niya =

Indian cricketer (born 1994)

Personal information
- Born: 18 October 1994 (age 32)
- Batting: Right-handed
- Bowling: Right-arm medium-fast
- Role: Bowler

Domestic team information
- Years: Team
- 2019/20–present: Arunachal Pradesh

Career statistics
Competition	FC	LA	T20
Matches	13	19	18
Runs scored	70	47	13
Batting average	3.88	3.35	13.00
100s/50s	0/0	0/0	0/0
Top score	14*	17	6*
Balls bowled	1,635	586	225
Wickets	16	20	4
Bowling average	81.31	36.70	102.50
5 wickets in innings	0	2	0
10 wickets in match	0	0	0
Best bowling	3/114	6/48	1/14
Catches/stumpings	3/–	2/–	2/–
- Source: Cricinfo, 20 March 2025

Yab Niya (born 18 October 1994) is an Indian cricketer. He made his List A debut on 11 October 2019, for Arunachal Pradesh in the 2019–20 Vijay Hazare Trophy. He made his Twenty20 debut on 8 November 2019, for Arunachal Pradesh in the 2019–20 Syed Mushtaq Ali Trophy. He made his first-class debut on 9 December 2019, for Arunachal Pradesh in the 2019–20 Ranji Trophy.
