= Uppara Girinath =

Indian cricketer (born 1998)

Personal information
- Full name: Uppara Murali Sambavi Girinath
- Born: 9 October 1998 (age 28); Kurnool, Andhra Pradesh, India
- Source: Cricinfo, 27 January 2020

Uppara Girinath (born 9 October 1998) is an Indian cricketer. He made his first-class debut on 27 January 2020, for Andhra in the 2019–20 Ranji Trophy.
