= Rohan Marwaha =

Indian cricketer (born 1994)

Personal information
- Born: 23 April 1994 (age 32)
- Source: Cricinfo, 11 January 2020

Rohan Marwaha (born 23 April 1994) is an Indian cricketer. He made his first-class debut on 11 January 2020, for Punjab in the 2019–20 Ranji Trophy.
