= Siraparapu Ashish =

Indian cricketer (born 1998)

Personal information
- Born: 2 November 1998 (age 28); Visakhapatnam, Andhra Pradesh, India
- Batting: Right-handed
- Bowling: Slow left arm orthodox
- Source: Cricinfo, 5 February 2018

Siraparapu Ashish (born 2 November 1998) is an Indian cricketer. He made his List A debut for Andhra Pradesh in the 2017–18 Vijay Hazare Trophy on 5 February 2018. He made his first-class debut on 4 February 2020, for Andhra in the 2019–20 Ranji Trophy. He made his Twenty20 debut on 19 January 2021, for Andhra in the 2020–21 Syed Mushtaq Ali Trophy.
