= Rajat Choudhary =

Indian cricketer (born 1999)

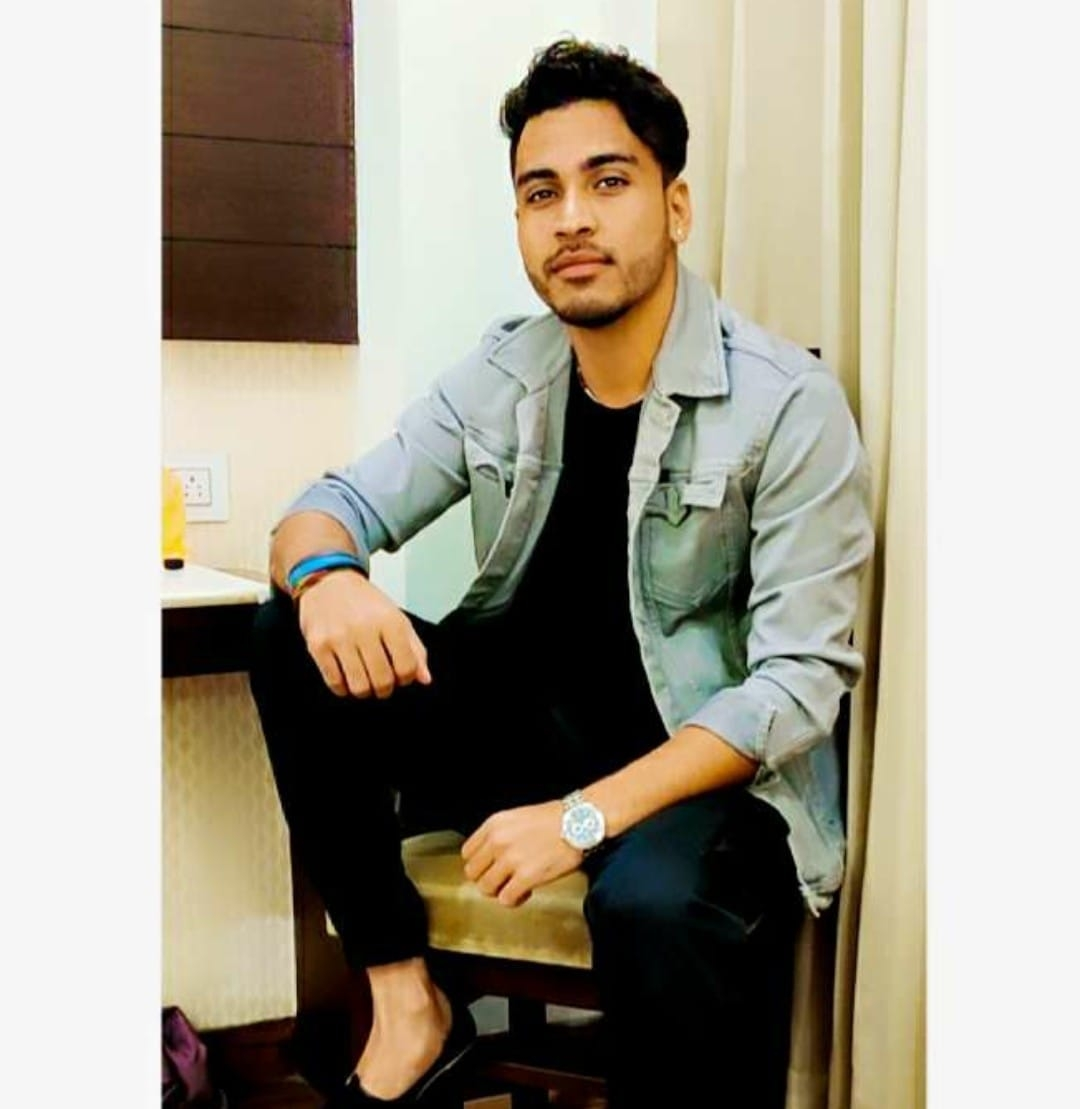

Personal information
- Born: 10 October 1999 (age 27); Kota, Rajasthan, India
- Batting: Right handed
- Bowling: Right-arm off break
- Role: All-Rounder

Domestic team information
- Years: Team
- 2019: Rajasthan

Career statistics
Competition	FC
Matches	1
Runs scored	23
Batting average	11.50
100s/50s	0/0
Top score	23
Balls bowled	150
Wickets	0
Bowling average	–
5 wickets in innings	–
10 wickets in match	–
Best bowling	–
Catches/stumpings	3/–
- Source: Cricinfo, 17 December 2019

Rajat Choudhary (born 10 October 1999) is an Indian cricketer. He made his first-class debut on 17 December 2019, for Rajasthan in the 2019–20 Ranji Trophy. He is an all-rounder who bats right-handed and bowls right-arm off-break.
