= Shubham Sharma (Rajasthan cricketer) =

Indian cricketer (born 1997)

Personal information
- Full name: Shubham Kamal Sharma
- Born: 26 March 1997 (age 29); Jaipur, Rajasthan, India
- Batting: Left-handed
- Bowling: Slow left arm orthodox
- Source: Cricinfo, 17 November 2017

Shubham Sharma (born 26 March 1997) is an Indian cricketer. He made his first-class debut for Rajasthan in the 2017–18 Ranji Trophy on 17 November 2017. He made his List A debut on 7 October 2019, for Rajasthan in the 2019–20 Vijay Hazare Trophy.
