= Nitin Sharma =

Indian cricketer (born 1996)

Personal information
- Born: 28 September 1996 (age 30); Una, Himachal Pradesh, India
- Source: ESPNcricinfo, 21 February 2019

Nitin Sharma (born 28 September 1996) is an Indian cricketer. He made his Twenty20 debut for Himachal Pradesh in the 2018–19 Syed Mushtaq Ali Trophy on 21 February 2019.
