= Karthik Raman =

Indian cricketer (born 1997)

Personal information
- Born: 7 April 1997 (age 29); East Godavari, India
- Source: ESPNcricinfo, 27 October 2016

Karthik Raman (born 7 April 1997) is an Indian cricketer. He made his first-class debut for Andhra in the 2016–17 Ranji Trophy on 27 October 2016.
