= Arafat Khan =

Indian cricketer (born 1996)

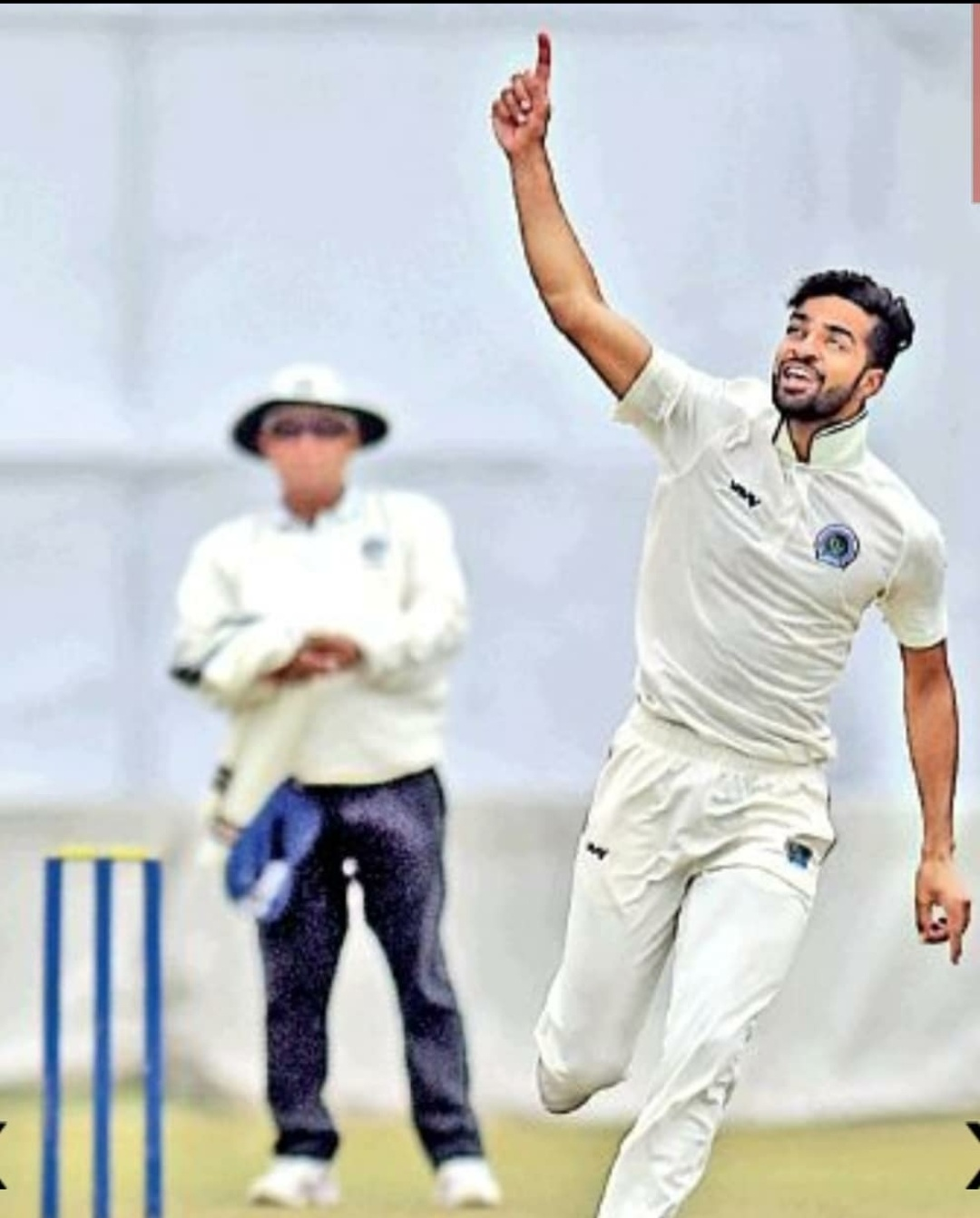

Personal information
- Full name: Mohdajaz Arafat Khan
- Born: 27 December 1996 (age 29); Jhalawar, Rajasthan, India
- Batting: Right-handed
- Bowling: Right-arm medium
- Source: ESPNcricinfo, 4 February 2020

Arafat Khan (born 27 December 1996) is an Indian cricketer. He made his first-class debut on 4 February 2020, for Rajasthan in the 2019–20 Ranji Trophy. He made his List A debut on 27 February 2021, for Rajasthan in the 2020–21 Vijay Hazare Trophy.

Born and raised in Jhalawar, Arafat trained at Pravin Sharma Cricket ground under coach Farukh Ahmed and started his youth career with the Jhalawar cricket team. Playing Under-19 district in year 2012-2013 and by performing in it he got selected for Under-19 Rajasthan team and now he has been playing Ranji Trophy for Rajasthan.
