= Krishan Alang =

Indian cricketer (born 1991)

Personal information
- Born: 19 September 1991 (age 35); Kapurthala, Punjab, India
- Batting: Right-handed
- Bowling: Right-arm offbreak

Domestic team information
- Years: Team
- 2018/19: Punjab
- Source: ESPNcricinfo, 4 February 2020

Krishan Alang (born 19 September 1991) is an Indian cricketer. He made his Twenty20 debut for Punjab in the 2018–19 Syed Mushtaq Ali Trophy on 27 February 2019. He made his first-class debut on 4 February 2020, for Punjab in the 2019–20 Ranji Trophy.
