= Ritwik (theatre group) =

Theatre group in West Bengal, India

- Logo of the theatre group
- Formation: 1980
- Type: Theatre group
- Location(s): Bimal Sinha Road, Murshidabad, West Bengal, India. Acitivies throughout the year and aim: 1.Two new productions a year. 2.Workshopbased production with school children from the schools like J N Academy High School, Lipika Memorial Girls' High School,2 schools from Lalgola. 3.One year intensive workshop for the College Students. 4.Monthly Regular Show at Home Town. And 5.Celebration of Bengali New year through Whole Night Theatre Festival on 14 April. All respectives are invited for upper said programmes.
- Artistic director(s): Goutam Roychowdhury from 1980-2011, Priyankusekhar Das, Biplab Dey, Rajen Das, Shipra Sen(2011-Till date)
- Notable members: Ritwik has been organising "Desh Bidesher Natyamela" from 17 years. This year's Ceremony is from 9–19 December.
- Website: http://www.theatreritwik.org/

Ritwik is a Bengali theatre group of Berhampur, West Bengal, India. The group was formed in 1980. The theatre group has staged more than 20 productions. Goutam Roychowdhury was director of this group who expired on 24 June 2011.

== Productions ==
- Sinhasan(1980) Jaamgachh(1981)
- Nichhak Vooter Gappo Noi (1982)
- Bhoot (1982)
- Pratikriya (1983)
- Strir Patra (1985)
- Taser Desh (1986)
- Kaler Mandira (1986)
- Gora (1992)
- Chhoto Sukh (1993)
- Karl Marx (1995)
- Bisarjan (1996)
- Seema Chouhuddi (1998)
- Bipanna Bhoome (1999)
- Atmobimbo (2001)
- Minira Voleni (2002)
- Byas (2003)
- Meghboti (2003)
- Marutrish (2004)
- Doodh Maa(2004)
- Bharat Puran(2005)
- Deshodrohi (2006)
- Kusum Kotha (2006)
- Chaturanga (2007)
- Phoolmoti (2008)
- Antor Andor (2009)
- Dibaratrir Kavya (2009)
- Dakghar (2010)(Gautam Roy Chowdhury's last direction)
- Ebang Sesh Adhyai (2011)
- Sesh Raxa (2011)
- Jagaran Pala (2012)
- Adi Raja(2013–14)
- Kankal (2013–14)
- Aandhare surya (2015)
- Ghost (2016)
- Juto (2016)
- CHAMPABATI (2017)
- Tusher Agun (2018)
- Angan Natok:
- Hallabol (1989)
- Ajodhyar Lajja (1992)
- Rakto Trisha (1996)
- 30se January(1998)
- Sagarparer Rajkanya (2000)
- Haripada Mishtri (2000)
- Jatugriha (2002)
- Saharjadir Galpo (2003)
- Workshop Based Productions:
- WWW.COM (2010)
- Hamliner Banshiwala (2010)
- Ek Dhama Alu (2011)
- Bagha Tetuler Gappo (2011)
- Chandalika (2011)
- Dharmaputra (2013)
- Abu Hossain(2014)
- Kali Thali Mahatta (2015)
- Jiyon Kanya (2016)
- De Ma Pagal Kore (2018)
