= Siddhant Sharma =

Indian cricketer (born 1996)

Personal information
- Full name: Siddhant Sharma.
- Born: 11 December 1996 (age 29)
- Batting: Left-handed
- Bowling: Left-arm medium-fast
- Source: Cricinfo, 4 February 2020

Siddhant Sharma (born 11 December 1996) is an Indian cricketer. He made his first-class debut on 4 February 2020, for Delhi in the 2019–20 Ranji Trophy. He made his Twenty20 debut on 19 January 2021, for Delhi in the 2020–21 Syed Mushtaq Ali Trophy. He made his List A debut on 11 December 2021, for Delhi in the 2021–22 Vijay Hazare Trophy.
