= Nilkantha Das =

Indian cricketer (born 1988)

Personal information
- Born: 12 April 1988 (age 38); Mogra, Hugli, India
- Source: ESPNcricinfo, 27 January 2020

Nilkantha Das (born 12 April 1988) is an Indian cricketer. He made his first-class debut on 27 January 2020, for Bengal in the 2019–20 Ranji Trophy.
