= Mohit Kale =

Indian cricketer (born 1996)

Personal information
- Full name: Mohit Rajendra Kale
- Born: 27 November 1996 (age 29); Amravati, Maharashtra, India
- Batting: Right-handed
- Bowling: Right arm leg break
- Source: ESPNcricinfo, 28 November 2018

Mohit Kale (born 27 November 1996) is an Indian cricketer. He made his first-class debut for Vidarbha in the 2018–19 Ranji Trophy on 28 November 2018. He was part of the Vidarbha team that won the Ranji Trophy and the Irani Trophy. As captain, he led Vidarbha to victory in the Men's U-23 One Day Tournament in the 2018–19 season and the U-23 CK Nayudu Trophy in the 2019–20 season. Kale made his List A debut for Puducherry in the 2023–24 season. In the same season, he became the first player from Puducherry to score a double century in the Ranji Trophy (Elite Group), finishing unbeaten on 202 runs off 388 balls.
