= Muhammad Rafique (mathematician) =

Pakistani mathematician

- Born: January 2, 1940; Lahore, Punjab, British India (present-day Lahore, Punjab in Pakistan)
- Died: June 16, 1996 (aged 56); Dhahran, Saudi Arabia
- Resting place: Lahore, Punjab, Pakistan
- Citizenship: Pakistan (1947–1996)
- Education: University of Punjab; University of North Wales
- Known for: Group theory and Special relativity
- Scientific career
- Fields: Mathematics
- Workplaces: University of Punjab; International Center for Theoretical Physics; King Fahd University; University of Tripoli

Muhammad Rafique (2 January 1940 — 16 June 1996) was a Pakistani mathematician and professor of mathematics at the Punjab University. He was a versatile scholar who authored textbooks on computer language and special relativity. He was the co-author of textbook Group Theory for High Energy Physicists, which was eventually published years after his death in 2016.

== Biographical overview ==
Rafique was born in Lahore, Punjab in British India on 2 January 1940 in Lahore, Punjab in India and was educated at the Punjab University where he graduated with BA with first-class honours in Mathematics in 1960. He served in the Faculty of Mathematics at the Punjab University where he graduated with MA in Mathematics in 1964, and earned a scholarship to study mathematics in the United Kingdom. He attended the University of North Wales where he graduated with a PhD in Mathematics in 1967.

Upon returning to Pakistan, he joined the Punjab University and taught there until 1971 when he joined the International Center for Theoretical Physics in Italy as a post-doctoral scholar. From 1972 to 1977, Rafique worked at the Institute of Nuclear Science and Technology where he contributed his work on fast neutron calculations for atomic weapons which built his interests in the theory of relativity and nuclear physics.

From 1977 to 1982, he served on the faculty of University of Tripoli in Libya, and served as the Head of Department of Mathematics at the Punjab University from 1983 until 1992 when he went to teach mathematics at the King Fahd University in Saudi Arabia. His tenure at the King Fahd University was short-lived. He died due to cardiac arrest in June 1996. Although a mathematician, Rafique was a prolific author on physics, was writing a college text on group theory's applications on high energy physics with Mohammad Saleem at the time of his death in 1992. The college book was eventually published in 2015–2016 by British publisher Taylor & Francis.

=== Textbooks ===
- Saleem, Mohammad; Rafique, Muhammad (2016). Group Theory for High Energy Physicists. Taylor & Francis. ISBN 978-1-4665-1064-7.
- Rafique, Muhammad (1993). FORTRAN Programming on a Personal Computer. Lahore, Punj. Pakistan: Punjab University Press.
- Rafique, Muhammad (1983). Differential Equations for Scientists and Engineers. Lahore, Punj. Pakistan: Punjab University Press.
- Rafique, Muhammad (1985). Practical Geometry. Lahore, Punj. Pakistan: Punjab University Press.
- Saleem, Mohammad; Rafique, Muhammad (1992). Special Relativity: Applications to Particle Physics and the classical theory of fields. Ellis Horwood. ISBN 978-0-13-827106-0.

== See also ==
- Definite integral
