= Manohar Lal Munjal =

Indian engineer (born 1945)

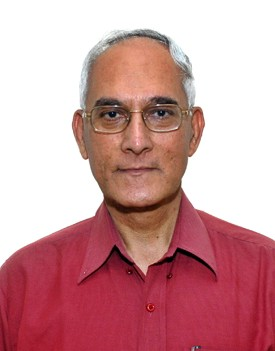
- Professor (Emeritus) Indian Institute of Science, Bengaluru
- Born: 4 April 1945 (age 81); Punjab, India
- Education: Panjab University; Indian Institute of Science
- Known for: Studies on Acoustics of Ducts and Mufflers
- Awards: 1975 INSA Young Scientist Medal; 1980 ASI Sir C.V. Raman Award; 1983 Nelson Acoustical Paper Award (First Prize); 1986 Shanti Swarup Bhatnagar Prize; 1995 Professor Rustom Choksi Award; 2005 ASI Professor S. Bhagwantam Award; 2007 ASI Sir C.V. Raman Award; 2009 DRDO Academic Excellence Award; 2010 MPCST Jawaharlal Nehru National Award; 2013 INAE Prof. Jai Krishna Memorial Award; 2022 ScholarGPS Highly Ranked Scholar - Lifetime
- Scientific career
- Fields: Technical Acoustics; Noise and Vibration Control
- Workplaces: Indian Institute of Science; Technische Universität Berlin; University of Calgary; Nelson Industries; Ford Motor Company

Manohar Lal Munjal (born 4 April 1945) is an Indian acoustical engineer, emeritus professor, and AICTE Distinguished Chair Professor at the Facility for Research in Technical Acoustics (FRITA) of the Indian Institute of Science. He is known for his studies on Acoustics of Ducts and Mufflers. He is an elected fellow of all the three major Indian science academies viz. Indian Academy of Sciences, Indian National Science Academy, National Academy of Sciences, India as well as the Indian National Academy of Engineering. He has published five books viz. Noise and Vibration Control, Acoustics of Ducts and Mufflers With Application to Exhaust and Ventilation System Design, Acoustics of Ducts and Mufflers - Second Edition, Noise and Vibration Control - Second Edition and IUTAM Symposium on Designing for Quietness and has contributed chapters to books edited by himself and others. The Council of Scientific and Industrial Research, the apex agency of the Government of India for scientific research, awarded him the Shanti Swarup Bhatnagar Prize for Science and Technology, one of the highest Indian science awards for his contributions to Engineering Sciences in 1986. (Note: Long link - please select award year to see details)

== Biography ==
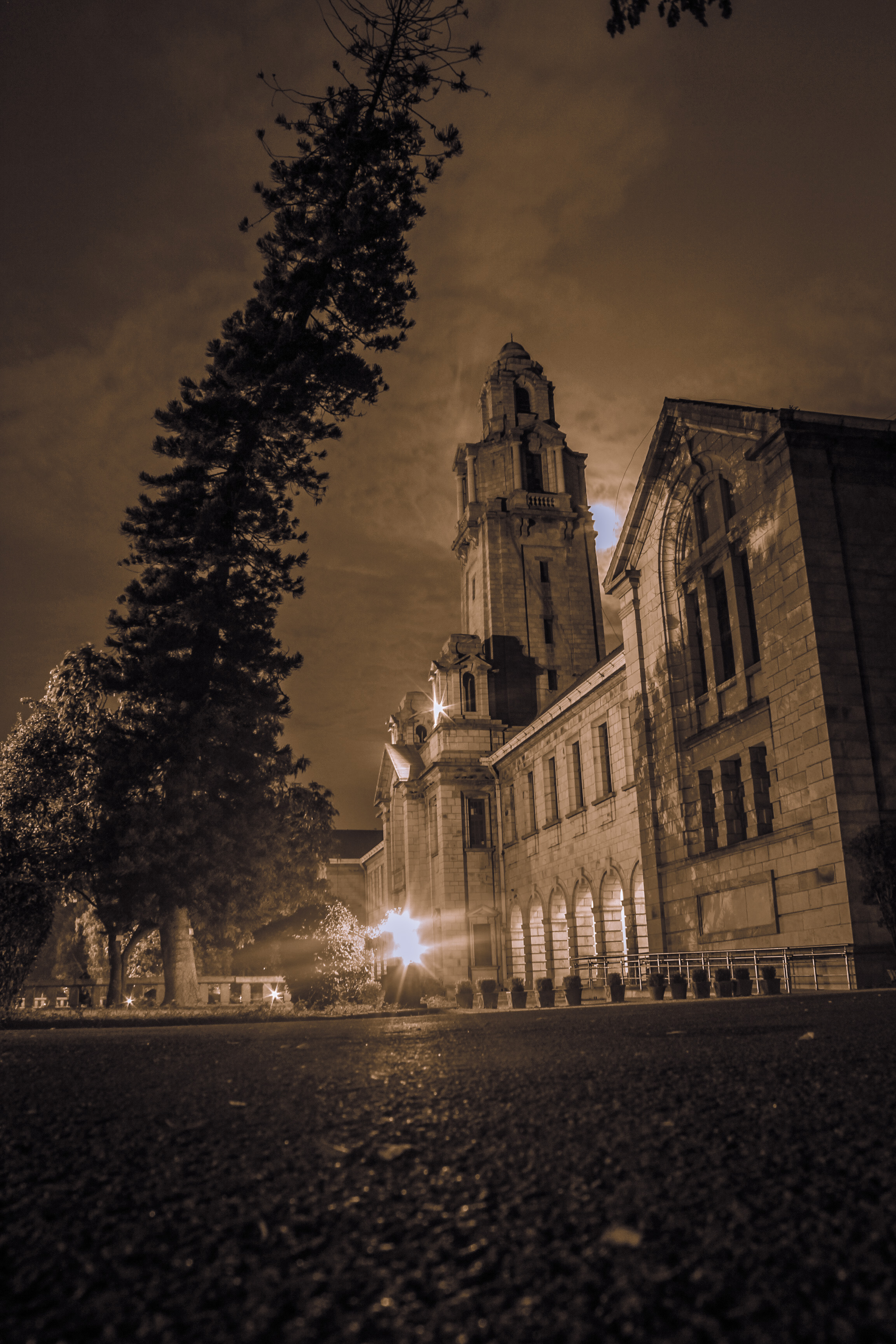
Indian Institute of Science

M. L. Munjal, born on 4 April 1945 in the Indian state of Punjab, graduated in mechanical engineering with honors in 1966 from Panjab University and a master's degree in internal combustion engineering with distinction from the Indian Institute of Science (IISc) in 1968. He joined IISc as a member of faculty in 1968, simultaneously pursuing his doctoral studies and earned his PhD in 1971. He served IISc in many positions: chairing the department of mechanical engineering during 1991–94, the division of mechanical sciences from 1999 to 2005, and serving as the convener of the Chairmen of Divisions from 2003 to 2005. In between, he had three positions abroad as a visiting faculty member. In 1979, he served at Technische Universität Berlin for a year. From 1986–87, he worked at University of Calgary and Nelson Industries in Wisconsin. Then in 1994–95 he served as a visiting scientist at Ford Motor Company at their Michigan centre. Post-retirement, he served as an honorary professor, INSA senior scientist and at the Facility for Research in Technical Acoustics (FRITA) of the Indian Institute of Science.

Munjal lives in Bengaluru, Karnataka.

== Legacy ==
Munjal has done extensive research in acoustics with special focus on noise and vibration control. He researched and wrote about designing and optimization of mufflers and his work has applications in the automotive industry and Heating, ventilation and air conditioning systems. His research has been documented in several peer-reviewed articles; (Note: Please see Selected articles section) and Google Scholar and ResearchGate, online repositories of scientific articles, have listed 221 and 121 of them respectively. He has authored four books, Noise and Vibration Control, Acoustics of Ducts and Mufflers With Application to Exhaust and Ventilation System Design, Acoustics of Ducts and Mufflers - Second Edition, and Noise and Vibration Control - Second Edition. He has also contributed chapters to books.

Munjal has undertaken over 130 industrial consultancy projects on noise control and quieter designs and holds two patents and one copyright for his work. He founded Facility for Research in Technical Acoustics (FRITA), a dedicated centre for research in acoustics under the umbrella of the department of mechanical engineering at IISc and has also guided 18 doctoral and over 70 master's scholars in their studies. He sits in the editorial boards of International Journal of Acoustics and Vibration, British Journal of Noise and Health, Indian Journal of Engineering and Material Science and the Annals of the European Academy of Sciences and is a former editorial board member of the International Journal of Conditioning Monitoring and Diagnostic Engineering Management (COMADEM). He was also the guest editor of the Volume 109 of Current Science published in July 2015. His association with government agencies included the chair of the National Committee for Noise Pollution Control (1997-2015), and memberships in Science and Engineering Research Council of the Department of Science and Technology for two terms (1991-1994 and 2004-2007), Technology Advisory Board of the Council of Scientific and Industrial Research (1994–98) and Board of Research of All India Council for Technical Education (1994–97). He presided over the Acoustical Society of India during 1999–2000 and served as the vice president of the Indian National Science Academy from 2011 to 2013. He held the chair of the Karnataka State Industrial Investment and Development Corporation from 1991 to 1994 and is a former member of the director board of the International Institute of Acoustics and Vibration (1995–2001). He has delivered invited or keynote addresses at several seminars. He sat in the Senate of the Indian Institute of Technology Ropar. He held the honorary position as INAE Distinguished Professor (2010-2013) and AICTE Distinguished Chair Professor (2021-2024).

=== Books ===
- M. L. Munjal (8 May 1987). Acoustics of Ducts and Mufflers With Application to Exhaust and Ventilation System Design. John Wiley & Sons, New York. ISBN 978-0-471-84738-0.
- M. L. Munjal (7 June 2013). Noise and Vibration Control. World Scientific, Singapore. ISBN 978-981-4434-75-1.
- M. L. Munjal (2014), Acoustics of Ducts and Mufflers - Second Edition, John Wiley & Sons, UK. ISBN 978-1-118-44312-5.
- M. L. Munjal and B. Venkatesham (2024), Noise and Vibration Control – Second Edition, IISc Press and World Scientific, Singapore. ISBN 978-9811283147

=== Chapters ===
- Manohar Lal Munjal (17 April 2003). "Analysis and Design of Annular Airgap lined Duct for Hot Exhaust Systems". IUTAM Symposium on Designing for Quietness: Proceedings of the IUTAM Symposium held in Bangalore, India, 12–14 December 2000. Springer Science & Business Media. pp. 1–. ISBN 978-94-017-0095-5.
- M. L. Munjal, Anthony G. Galaitsis and Istvan L. Ver (2006). Passive Silencers - Chapter 9 in Noise and Vibration Control Engineering Principles and Practices - Second Edition, John Wiley & Sons Inc., New York
- F.P. Mechel (25 June 2008). Formulas of Acoustics. Springer Science & Business Media. pp. 1–. ISBN 978-3-540-76832-6.

=== Selected articles ===
- M. L. Munjal and K. M. Kumar, (2023) “State of the art of rational design of efficient mufflers”, Noise Control Engineering Journal, 71(3), 169-179.
- M. L. Munjal (August 2020). “Theory and design of the double-tuned coaxial and flow reversal mufflers: A new perspective” Journal of The Institution of Engineers (India): Series C, 101(4), 619-629. DOI:https://doi.org/10.1007/s40032-020-00594-3.
- K. M. Kumar and M. L. Munjal (June 2019). “Direct estimation and experimental validation of the acoustic source characteristics of turbocharged diesel engine exhaust system”, Applied Acoustics, 149, 171-180.
- K. M. Kumar and M. L. Munjal (July–August 2018). "On development of rational design guidelines for large side-inlet side-outlet perforated element mufflers", Noise Control Engineering Journal, 66(4), 308-323.
- K. M. Kumar and M. L. Munjal (September–October 2017). "On the crucial role of mean flow in the design of multiply-connected coaxial perforated element mufflers", Noise Control Engineering Journal, 65(5), 462-481.
- A. Mimani and M. L. Munjal (2016). "Design of reactive rectangular expansion chambers for broadband acoustic attenuation performance based on optimal port location", Acoustics Australia, 44(2), 299-323. DOI: 10.1007/s40857-016-0053-8.
- Abhishek Verma and M. L. Munjal (May 2015). "Flow-acoustic analysis of the perforated baffle three-chamber hybrid muffler configuration", SAE International Journal of Passenger Cars - Mechanical Systems, 8(1), 370-381. DOI:10.4271/2015-26-0131.
- E. Ramya and M. L. Munjal (July–August 2014). "Improved tuning of the extended concentric tube resonator for wide-band transmission loss," Noise Control Engineering Journal, 62(4), 252-263.
- A. Mimani and M. L. Munjal (March 2012). "3-D acoustic analysis of elliptical chamber mufflers having an end-inlet and side-outlet: An impedance matrix approach", Wave Motion, 49(2), 271-295.
- B. Venkatesham, Mayank Tiwari and M.L. Munjal (October 2010). "Analytical prediction of break-out noise from a reactive rectangular plenum with four flexible walls", Journal of the Acoustical Society of America, 128(4), 1789-99.

== Awards and honors ==
During his early years in research, Munjal was awarded the Young Scientist Medal by the Indian National Science Academy in 1975; the award citation mentioned about the Significant Contribution in Noise Control and Vehicle Dynamics. In 1980, the Acoustical Society of India selected his article in the Journal of Acoustical Society of India (JASI) for the Sir C.V. Raman Award and three years later, another of his article fetched him the 1983 Nelson Acoustical Paper Award First Prize; he would receive the Sir C.V. Raman Award a second time in 2007. The Council of Scientific and Industrial Research awarded him the Shanti Swarup Bhatnagar Prize, one of the highest Indian science awards in 1986. He received the Professor Rustom Choksi Award of the Indian Institute of Science in 1995 and the Professor S. Bhagwantam Award of the Acoustical Society of India in 2005; in between, he received the Mira Paul Memorial Award of the Acoustical Foundation for Education and Charitable Trust (AFECT) in 2000. The Defence Research and Development Organisation awarded him the Academy Excellence Award for his contributions in the development of practical solutions for meeting defence and civilian requirements, the same year as he received the Jawaharlal Nehru National Award of the Madhya Pradesh Council for Science and Technology. He was awarded the Professor Jai Krishna Memorial Award of the Indian National Academy of Engineering in 2013. Recently, he has been placed in the top 0.05% of scholars in his specialty (Vibration) World wide, and conferred the ScholarGPS award: Highly Ranked Scholar - Lifetime (2022, 2024)

Munjal, a fellow of the International Institute of Acoustics and Vibration, was elected as a fellow by the Indian National Science Academy and the Indian Academy of Sciences in 1987 and the National Academy of Sciences, India followed suit in 1990. He is also a fellow of the Indian National Academy of Engineering and the Acoustical Society of India. He is a Distinguished International Member of the Institute of Noise Control Engineering (INCE) USA, the only Indian to receive the honor, and a member of the European Academy of Sciences. He is now an honorary fellow of the International Institute of Acoustics and Vibration. The award orations delivered by Munjal include M. S. Narayanan Memorial Lecture Award of the Acoustical Society of India in 1995 and the Dr. Guru Prasad Chatterjee Memorial Lecture of the Indian National Science Academy in 2006.

== See also ==
- Duct (flow)
- Muffler
