= K. V. Sasikanth =

Indian cricketer (born 1995)

Personal information
- Full name: Kodiramakrishna Venkata Sasikanth
- Born: 17 July 1995 (age 31); Visakhapatnam, Andhra Pradesh, India
- Batting: Right-handed
- Bowling: Right-arm medium
- Role: All-rounder

Domestic team information
- Years: Team
- 2015/16–present: Andhra Pradesh

Career statistics
Competition	FC	LA	T20
Matches	50	29	61
Runs scored	1,083	266	418
Batting average	17.75	16.62	16.72
100s/50s	0/4	0/1	0/0
Top score	99*	52*	47*
Balls bowled	8,085	1,156	1,300
Wickets	158	23	67
Bowling average	23.78	46.86	26.73
5 wickets in innings	9	0	0
10 wickets in match	1	–	–
Best bowling	6/18	3/46	3/8
Catches/stumpings	19/–	12/–	31/–
- Source: Cricinfo, 3 October 2026

K. V. Sasikanth (born 17 July 1995) is an Indian cricketer who plays for Andhra Pradesh. He made his first-class debut on 22 October 2015 in the 2015–16 Ranji Trophy. He made his List A debut on 10 December 2015 in the 2015–16 Vijay Hazare Trophy.

Sasikanth was the joint leading wicket-taker for Andhra in the 2018–19 Ranji Trophy, with 17 dismissals in four matches. He took his best first-class bowling figures in that season, taking 6 for 18 and helping to dismiss Madhya Pradesh for 35.
