= Mohammad Saleem (physicist) =

Pakistani physicist

- Born: 1934; Lahore, Punjab, India (Present-day Lahore, Punjab in Pakistan)
- Died: 1 January 2016 (aged 82); Lahore, Punjab, Pakistan
- Citizenship: Pakistan (1947–2016)
- Education: University of Punjab; London University
- Known for: Group theory and Quantum mechanics
- Scientific career
- Fields: Particle physics
- Workplaces: University of Punjab; University of Florida

Mohammad Saleem (1934–2 January 2016) was a Pakistani particle physicist and a professor of physics at the Punjab University. He was the founding director of the Centre for High Energy Physics, and author of mathematical physics book, Group Theory for High Energy Physicists, published in 2016.

== Biography ==
Saleem was born in 1934, and received in his BA with Honors in mathematics, followed by MA in mathematics, and MSc in physics from the University of Punjab. He was further educated in the United Kingdom where he received BSc in First class honours in Physics. Upon returning, he entered in doctoral program in his alma mater, and successfully defended his doctoral thesis in physics in 1962.

He was the founding director of the Centre for High Energy Physics (CHEP), and served in the faculty of physics at the University of Florida in the United States. He was the author of text of modern physics, namely quantum mechanics, special relativity, and high-energy physics, written in collaboration with mathematician, Dr. Muhammad Rafique, which have been published internationally.

On 2 January 2016, Saleem died in Lahore, Punjab, Pakistan, and is buried in Punjab University's graveyard.

=== Textbooks ===
- Saleem, Mohammad; Rafique, Muhammad (2016). Group Theory for High Energy Physicists. Taylor & Francis. ISBN 978-1-4665-1064-7.
- Saleem, Mohammad (2015). Quantum Mechanics. IOP, Publishing Limited. ISBN 978-0-7503-1207-3.
- Saleem, Mohammad; Rafique, Muhammad (1992). Special relativity: applications to particle physics and the classical theory of fields. Ellis Horwood. ISBN 978-0-13-827106-0.
