= Mohammed Ahmed (cricketer) =

Indian cricketer (born 1989)

Personal information
- Born: 4 September 1989 (age 37); Jaipur, India
- Source: ESPNcricinfo, 8 November 2019

Mohammed Ahmed (born 4 September 1989) is an Indian cricketer. He made his Twenty20 debut on 8 November 2019, for Railways in the 2019–20 Syed Mushtaq Ali Trophy.
