= Salman Nizar =

Indian cricketer

Personal information
- Born: 30 June 1997 (age 29); Thalassery, Kerala, India
- Batting: Left-handed
- Bowling: Right arm offbreak
- Role: Batter

Domestic team information
- Years: Team
- 2015–present: Kerala (squad no. 12)

Career statistics
Competition	FC	LA	T20
Matches	32	26	27
Runs scored	1,471	589	450
Batting average	40.86	29.45	45.00
100s/50s	2/7	0/3	0/2
Top score	150	82*	99*
Catches/stumpings	22/–	15/–	17/–
- Source: Cricinfo, 16 February 2025

Salman Nizar (born 30 June 1997) is an Indian cricketer who represents Kerala on domestic cricket. He is a left-handed batsman and right-arm offspinner.

== Domestic career ==
After representing Kerala in U-14, U-16, and U-23 levels, Salman made his first-class debut for Kerala on 6 February 2015 in the 2014-15 Ranji Trophy against Assam. He was the top-scorer for Kerala the quarter-final match against Vidarbha in the 2017-18 Ranji Trophy scoring 62 runs from 102 balls. He scored his career-best score in the format of 91* against Punjab in the 2019-20 Ranji Trophy.

He made his List A debut for Kerala in the 2016–17 Vijay Hazare Trophy on 25 February 2017 against Tripura. He scored his highest individual score in format of 82 runs* in this match. He finished as his side's leading run-scorer in the tournament scoring 215 runs from six matches.

He made his Twenty20 debut for Kerala in the 2017–18 Zonal T20 League on 8 January 2018 against Hyderabad.

In August 2018, he was one of eight players that were fined by the Kerala Cricket Association, after showing dissent against Kerala's captain, Sachin Baby.

He played for KCA Lions in the 2020-21 KCA President's Cup T20.
