= Suraj Tayam =

Indian cricketer (born 1984)

Personal information
- Born: 2 April 1984 (age 42); Ningcho, East Kameng, Arunachal Pradesh
- Source: Cricinfo, 15 November 2019

Suraj Tayam (born 2 April 1984) is an Indian cricketer. He made his Twenty20 debut on 15 November 2019, for Arunachal Pradesh in the 2019–20 Syed Mushtaq Ali Trophy. He made his List A debut on 11 December 2021, for Arunachal Pradesh in the 2021–22 Vijay Hazare Trophy. He made his first-class debut on 17 February 2022, for Arunachal Pradesh in the 2021–22 Ranji Trophy.
