= CSR Sharma College Ground =

Cricket ground

- Prakasam District Cricket Association Stadium
- Full name: CSR Sharma College Ground
- Location: Ongole, Andhra Pradesh
- Owner: CSR Sharma College
- Operator: CSR Sharma College
- Capacity: 1,000

Construction
- Groundbreaking: 2012
- Opened: 2012

Website
- ESPNcricinfo

CSR Sarma College Ground is a cricket ground in Ongole, Andhra Pradesh. It is owned by CSR Sharma College along with Prakasam District Cricket Association and was established in 2012. The first first-class to be played there came in the 2015 Ranji Trophy when Andhra cricket team played Tripura cricket team. Till date the ground has hosted two more first-class matches in 2015 season. The ground hosted few under-19s state matches.

The ground has pavilion with a seating capacity of 1000 along with three turfs wicket and all the modern facilities.
