= Government Model Senior Secondary School, Sector-16, Chandigarh =

Government Model Senior Secondary School, Sector-16 D, Chandigarh
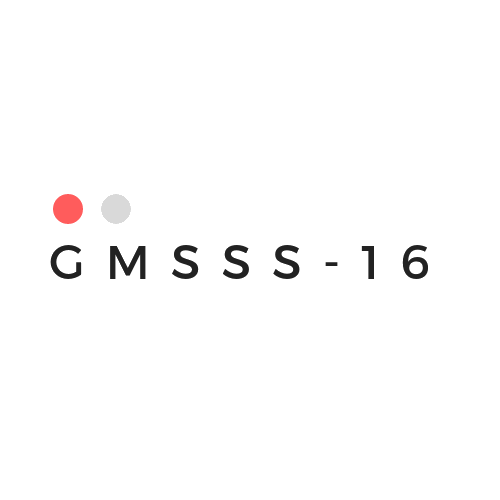

Location
- Sector - 16 D, Chandigarh, UT; 160015; India
- Coordinates: 30.7470785°N 76.774029°E

Information
- Other names: GMSSS-16, 16-Model
- School type: State-funded Public High School
- Motto: Strive to Rise
- Established: 1954
- School board: Central Board of Secondary Education
- School code: 04828
- Principal: Mrs. Bhavneet Kaur
- Language: English
- Website: http://gmsss16.com

Government Model Senior Secondary School, Sector-16 (often called GMSSS-16 or simply 16-Model) is a State-funded co-educational secondary school located in Chandigarh, India, educating students in grades K–12. Founded in 1954, it is the oldest school in Chandigarh and among the most selective. The school is affiliated to the Central Board of Secondary Education and offers twenty-three subjects at the AISSCE level, among the highest for any school in the region. It also claims a 100% pass percentage at the All India Secondary School Certificate Examination level.

The school's main building was designed by Swiss architect Pierre Jeanneret, along with Bhanu Pratap Mathur and Jugal Kishore Chowdhary, in line with the former's modernist ideals and was inaugurated by the then Commissioner of the Union Territory of Chandigarh in 1954.

== Academics ==
=== Curriculum ===
The School is affiliated to the internationally-recognised Central Board of Secondary Education, New Delhi and follows the NCERT curriculum.

=== Subject areas ===
The following subjects are offered at the AISSCE level:

Languages

- English Core (Mandatory)
- Hindi Core
- Hindi Elective
- Punjabi
- Sanskrit Core
- French

Sciences

- Physics
- Chemistry
- Mathematics
- Biology
- Computer Science

Business and Commerce

- Business Studies
- Entrepreneurship
- Accountancy

Humanities and Social Sciences

- Economics
- Psychology
- Sociology
- History
- Political Science
- Philosophy
- Geography
- Legal Studies
- Fine Arts
- Music (Vocal)
- Home Science

Non-credit

- Physical Education
- Work Experience
- General Studies

== Notable alumni ==
=== Politics ===
- Kapil Sibal, prominent lawyer and former Union Minister
- Ambika Soni, Member of Parliament and former Union Minister
- Chander Mohan, former deputy chief minister of Haryana
- Deepak-Raj Gupta, Member of the Australian Capital Territory Legislative Assembly, first PIO to get elected to Australian parliament

=== Academia ===
- Manohar Lal Munjal, scientist and professor at the Indian Institute of Science
- Vijay K. Dhir, professor and former Dean of the Henry Samueli School of Engineering and Applied Science at UCLA
- Sunil Saigal, professor and former Dean of the Newark College of Engineering
- K. K. Aggarwal, professor and founding Vice Chancellor of the Guru Gobind Singh Indraprastha University.
- Paras Anand, Scientist and Group Leader at Imperial College London.

=== Arts ===
- D. S. Kapoor, art historian and former principal of Government College of Arts, Chandigarh

=== Armed Forces ===
- Lt. Nishant Karol, Indian Army martyr. Every year the school hosts an intra-school quiz competition in his memory.

== See also ==
- Education in Punjab, India
- List of institutions of higher education in Chandigarh
- Chandigarh
