= Chaitanya Reddy =

Indian cricketer (born 1995)

Personal information
- Born: 15 October 1995 (age 31)

Domestic team information
- Years: Team
- 2018–present: Hyderabad

Career statistics
Competition	FC	LA	T20
Matches	1	3	2
Runs scored	3	13	–
Batting average	1.50	4.33	–
100s/50s	0/0	0/0	–/–
Top score	3	5	–
Balls bowled	6	72	–
Wickets	0	2	–
Bowling average	–	36.50	–
5 wickets in innings	–	0	–
10 wickets in match	–	0	–
Best bowling	–	1/22	–
Catches/stumpings	0/–	1/–	–/–
- Source: ESPNcricinfo, 6 May 2020

Chaitanya Reddy (born 15 October 1995) is an Indian cricketer. He made his List A debut for Hyderabad in the 2017–18 Vijay Hazare Trophy on 5 February 2018. He made his Twenty20 debut for Hyderabad in the 2018–19 Syed Mushtaq Ali Trophy on 27 February 2019. He made his first-class debut on 25 December 2019, for Hyderabad in the 2019–20 Ranji Trophy.
