= Ritwik Roy Chowdhury =

Indian cricketer (born 1995)

Personal information
- Full name: Ritwik Rupnath Roy Chowdhury
- Born: 20 November 1995 (age 30); Kolkata, West Bengal, India
- Batting: Right-handed
- Bowling: Right arm medium

Career statistics
Competition	T20
Matches	25
Runs scored	278
Batting average	23.16
100s/50s	0/0
Top score	36*
Balls bowled	6
Wickets	0
Bowling average	–
5 wickets in innings	–
10 wickets in match	–
Best bowling	–
Catches/stumpings	4/–
- Source: Cricinfo, 25 October 2022

Ritwik Roy Chowdhury (born 20 November 1995) is an Indian cricketer. He plays Twenty20 cricket for Bengal. He made his List A debut on 7 October 2019, for Bengal in the 2019–20 Vijay Hazare Trophy. He made his first-class debut on 3 January 2020, for Bengal in the 2019–20 Ranji Trophy.

== See also ==
- List of Bengal cricketers
