= Jamalpur Mallikarjun =

Indian cricketer (born 1993)

Personal information
- Born: 14 October 1993 (age 33); Hydershakote, Telangana, India
- Batting: Right-handed
- Role: Wicket-keeping

Domestic team information
- Years: Team
- 2018–present: Hyderabad

Career statistics
Competition	FC	LA	T20
Matches	2	7	6
Runs scored	52	70	61
Batting average	13.00	17.50	20.33
100s/50s	0/0	0/0	0/0
Top score	38	30	23*
Catches/stumpings	2/0	14/0	2/1
- Source: ESPNcricinfo, 6 May 2020

Jamalpur Mallikarjun (born 14 October 1993) is an Indian cricketer. He made his Twenty20 debut for Hyderabad in the 2018–19 Syed Mushtaq Ali Trophy on 2 March 2019. He made his List A debut on 28 September 2019, for Hyderabad in the 2019–20 Vijay Hazare Trophy. He made his first-class debut on 3 January 2020, for Hyderabad in the 2019–20 Ranji Trophy.
