= Kazi Saifi =

Indian cricketer (born 1998)

Kazi Junaid Saifi
Personal information
- Full name: Kazi Junaid Saifi
- Born: 18 August 1998 (age 28)
- Batting: Left-handed
- Bowling: Right-arm offbreak

Domestic team information
- Years: Team
- 2019/20–: Bengal
- Source: ESPNcricinfo, 19 January 2020

Kazi Junaid Saifi (born 18 August 1998) is an Indian cricketer. He made his first-class debut on 19 January 2020, for Bengal in the 2019–20 Ranji Trophy. Kazi Junaid was a student of Patha bhavan High school, Kolkata
