= Koushik Ghosh (cricketer) =

Indian cricketer (born 1992)

Personal information
- Full name: Koushik Biplab Ghosh
- Born: 22 October 1992 (age 34); North 24 Parganas, West Bengal, India
- Batting: Left-handed
- Bowling: Right arm medium

Domestic team information
- Years: Team
- 2013–present: Bengal

Career statistics
Competition	FC
Matches	9
Runs scored	384
Batting average	27.42
100s/50s	2/1
Top score	114
Balls bowled	90
Wickets	1
Bowling average	42.00
5 wickets in innings	0
10 wickets in match	0
Best bowling	1/16
Catches/stumpings	4/–
- Source: ESPNcricinfo, 28 December 2019

Koushik Ghosh (born 22 October 1992) is an Indian cricketer. He made his first-class debut on 18 January 2014, for Bengal in the 2013–14 Ranji Trophy.
