= Ramesh Prasad (cricketer) =

Indian cricketer

Personal information
- Full name: Ramesh Prasad
- Source: Cricinfo, 12 February 2020

Ramesh Prasad is an Indian cricketer. He made his first-class debut on 12 February 2020, for Bengal in the 2019–20 Ranji Trophy.
