= Shashidhar Reddy (cricketer) =

Indian cricketer (born 1995)

Personal information
- Born: 7 October 1995 (age 31)

Domestic team information
- Years: Team
- 2019–present: Hyderabad

Career statistics
Competition	FC	T20
Matches	2	1
Runs scored	23	4
Batting average	5.75	4.00
100s/50s	0/0	0/0
Top score	10	4
Catches/stumpings	1/–	0/–
- Source: Cricinfo, 6 May 2020

Shashidhar Reddy (born 7 October 1995) is an Indian cricketer. He made his Twenty20 debut on 15 November 2019, for Hyderabad in the 2019–20 Syed Mushtaq Ali Trophy. He made his first-class debut on 9 December 2019, for Hyderabad in the 2019–20 Ranji Trophy.
