= Uvais Ahmad =

Indian cricketer (born 1999)

Personal information
- Born: 28 December 1999 (age 26); Amroha, India
- Source: Cricinfo, 24 September 2019

Uvais Ahmad (born 28 December 1999) is an Indian cricketer. He made his List A debut on 24 September 2019, for Arunachal Pradesh in the 2019–20 Vijay Hazare Trophy.
