= Mohammad Rafi (cricketer) =

Indian cricketer (born 1998)

Personal information
- Born: 22 October 1998 (age 28)
- Source: ESPNcricinfo, 27 January 2020

Mohammad Rafi (born 22 October 1998) is an Indian cricketer. He made his first-class debut on 27 January 2020, for Andhra in the 2019–20 Ranji Trophy.
