= Rituraj Singh (cricketer) =

Indian cricketer (born 1990)

Personal information
- Full name: Rituraj Rajeev Singh
- Born: 19 October 1990 (age 36); Jaipur, Rajasthan, India
- Batting: Right-handed
- Bowling: Right-arm medium
- Role: All-rounder

Domestic team information
- Years: Team
- 2011–2024: Rajasthan

Career statistics
Competition	FC	LA	T20
Matches	54	21	25
Runs scored	1196	85	104
Batting average	18.40	6.53	8.66
100s/50s	0/4	0/0	0/0
Top score	59	16	29*
Balls bowled	9748	939	516
Wickets	176	16	19
Bowling average	27.93	49.75	30.94
5 wickets in innings	7	1	0
10 wickets in match	1	0	0
Best bowling	7/42	5/34	4/26
Catches/stumpings	16/–	1/–	8/–
- Source: ESPNcricinfo, 17 September 2023

Rituraj Rajeev Singh (born 19 October 1990) is an Indian cricketer who plays first-class cricket for Rajasthan. He is from Jaipur, Rajasthan.

Rituraj made his debut for Rajasthan in 2011/12 season. He played for India A in 2013. He switched to Jharkhand during the 2014/15 season and Goa in 2016/17 season. Ahead of the 2019/20 season, he returned to Rajasthan.
