= Akul Pandove =

Indian cricketer (born 1997)

Personal information
- Full name: Akul Pratap Pandove
- Born: 21 December 1997 (age 28); Patiala, India
- Batting: Right handed
- Bowling: Off spin
- Role: Allrounder
- Relatives: Dhruv Pandove (cousin)
- Source: ESPNcricinfo, 17 December 2019

Akul Pandove (born 21 December 1997) is an Indian cricketer. He made his first-class debut on 17 December 2019, for Punjab in the 2019–20 Ranji Trophy.
