= 2018–19 Syed Mushtaq Ali Trophy Group E =

Cricket tournament

- Dates: 21 February – 2 March 2019
- Administrator(s): BCCI
- Cricket format: Twenty20 cricket
- Tournament format(s): Round-robin and Playoff format
- Participants: 8

The 2018–19 Syed Mushtaq Ali Trophy was the tenth season of the Syed Mushtaq Ali Trophy, a Twenty20 cricket tournament in India. It was contested by the 37 domestic cricket teams of India, with seven teams in Group E. The group stage started on 21 February 2019, with the top two teams progressing to the Super League section of the competition.

Maharashtra won the group, with Uttar Pradesh finishing second to progress to the Super League phase of the tournament.

== Points table ==
Team	Pld	W	L	T	NR	Pts	NRR
Maharashtra	7	5	1	0	1	22	+1.249
Uttar Pradesh	7	5	1	0	1	22	+2.154
Uttarakhand	7	4	2	0	1	18	–1.287
Services (H)	7	4	2	0	1	18	+0.529
Baroda	7	3	3	0	1	14	–0.059
Hyderabad	7	1	5	0	1	6	–0.182
Pondicherry	7	1	5	0	1	6	–1.238
Tripura	7	1	5	0	1	6	–1.265

- Top two teams advances to the Super League.

(H) - Host

== Fixtures ==
=== Round 1 ===
21 February 2019
Scorecard

Tripura; 100 (19 overs)	v	Baroda; 101/2 (16.5 overs)
Nirupam Sen Chowdhary 21 (24); Atit Sheth 5/13 (4 overs)		Vishnu Solanki 32 (35); Tushar Saha 2/29 (4 overs)

Baroda won by 8 wickets
Palam A Ground, Delhi
Umpires: Nitin Pandit and Krishnamachari Srinivasan

- Tripura won the toss and elected to bat.
- Mohit Mongia, Mitesh Patel (Baroda), Joydeep Banik and Ninad Kadam (Tripura) all made their T20 debuts.

21 February 2019
Scorecard

Pondicherry; 159/6 (20 overs)	v	Hyderabad; 156/9 (20 overs)
Paras Dogra 89 (48); Mehdi Hasan 2/29 (4 overs)		Akshath Reddy 69 (51); Parandaman Thamaraikannan 4/39 (4 overs)

Pondicherry won by 3 runs
Palam B Ground, Delhi
Umpires: Saiyed Khalid and Abhijit Deshmukh

- Hyderabad won the toss and elected to field.
- Rohit Rayudu (Hyderabad), S Karthik, Damodaren Rohit, Vikneshwaran Marimuthu, Parandaman Thamaraikannan, Akshay Jain, Santhosh Kumaran and A Aravinddaraj (Pondicherry) all made their T20 debuts.

21 February 2019
Scorecard

Maharashtra; 149/5 (20 overs)	v	Uttar Pradesh; 137 (19.3 overs)
Naushad Shaikh 41 (31); Bobby Yadav 2/34 (4 overs)		Samarth Singh 93 (61); Satyajeet Bachhav 3/23 (4 overs)

Maharashtra won by 12 runs
Palam A Ground, Delhi
Umpires: Nitin Pandit and Krishnamachari Srinivasan

- Uttar Pradesh won the toss and elected to field.
- Yash Nahar, Vishal Gite, Manoj Ingale (Maharashtra), Priyam Garg, Shiva Singh, Bobby Yadav and Yash Dayal (Uttar Pradesh) all made their T20 debuts.

21 February 2019
Scorecard

Services; 164/5 (20 overs)	v	Uttarakhand; 165/7 (19.5 overs)
Rajat Paliwal 54* (35); Sunny Kashyap 1/18 (3 overs)		Karn Kaushal 58 (32); Vikas Yadav 5/9 (4 overs)

Uttarakhand won by 3 wickets
Palam B Ground, Delhi
Umpires: Saiyed Khalid and Abhijit Deshmukh

- Services won the toss and elected to bat.
- Mohit Ahlawat, Arjun Sharma, Vikas Yadav (Services), Sunny Rana, Vaibhav Singh Panwar, Girish Rauturi, Shivam Khurana, Vijay Sharma, Rohit Dangwal, Himanshu Bisht and Karn Kaushal (Uttarakhand) all made their T20 debuts.

=== Round 2 ===
22 February 2019
Scorecard

Tripura; 157/6 (20 overs)	v	Services; 158/2 (16.5 overs)
Manisankar Murasingh 52 (40); Diwesh Pathania 2/29 (4 overs)		Nakul Verma 73 (45); Nirupam Sen 1/10 (0.5 overs)

Services won by 8 wickets
Palam B Ground, Delhi
Umpires: Nitin Pandit and Saiyed Khalid

- Services won the toss and elected to field.
- Mohit Kumar (Services) made his T20 debut.

22 February 2019
Scorecard

Baroda; 152/5 (20 overs)	v	Uttarakhand; 153/3 (19 overs)
Kedar Devdhar 61 (49); Sunny Rana 2/27 (4 overs)		Vaibhav Singh Panwar 49* (36); Rishi Arothe 1/13 (2 overs)

Uttarakhand won by 7 wickets
Palam A Ground, Delhi
Umpires: Abhijit Deshmukh and Krishnamachari Srinivasan

- Baroda won the toss and elected to bat.
- Deepak Dhapola (Uttarakhand) made his T20 debut.

22 February 2019
Scorecard

Pondicherry; 101/6 (20 overs)	v	Maharashtra; 105/2 (15.4 overs)
Paras Dogra 29 (39); Divyang Hinganekar 4/19 (4 overs)		Ruturaj Gaikwad 55* (44); Pankaj Singh 2/18 (4 overs)

Maharashtra won by 8 wickets
Palam A Ground, Delhi
Umpires: Abhijit Deshmukh and Krishnamachari Srinivasan

- Pondicherry won the toss and elected to bat.
- Azim Kazi (Maharashtra) and Pratik Sargade (Pondicherry) both made their T20 debuts.

22 February 2019
Scorecard

Hyderabad; 139/7 (20 overs)	v	Uttar Pradesh; 143/4 (18.3 overs)
Bavanaka Sandeep 33 (31); Ankit Rajpoot 3/31 (4 overs)		Suresh Raina 54* (35); Ashish Reddy 3/33 (4 overs)

Uttar Pradesh won by 6 wickets
Palam B Ground, Delhi
Umpires: Nitin Pandit and Saiyed Khalid

- Hyderabad won the toss and elected to bat.
- Palakodeti Sairam (Hyderabad) made his T20 debut.

=== Round 3 ===
24 February 2019
Scorecard

Hyderabad; 131/7 (20 overs)	v	Baroda; 134/6 (19.4 overs)
Akshath Reddy 46 (44); Rishi Arothe 4/18 (4 overs)		Vishnu Solanki 40 (38); Chama Milind 2/18 (3.4 overs)

Baroda won by 4 wickets
Palam B Ground, Delhi
Umpires: Nitin Pandit and Krishnamachari Srinivasan

- Baroda won the toss and elected to field.

24 February 2019
Scorecard

Maharashtra; 116/9 (20 overs)	v	Services; 119/4 (19.2 overs)
Ankit Bawne 34 (28); Sachidanand Pandey 3/21 (3 overs)		Ravi Chauhan 45* (52); Satyajeet Bachhav 2/17 (4 overs); Azim Kazi 2/17 (4 overs)

Services won by 6 wickets
Palam A Ground, Delhi
Umpires: Saiyed Khalid and Abhijit Deshmukh

- Services won the toss and elected to field.

24 February 2019
Scorecard

Uttar Pradesh; 184/4 (20 overs)	v	Tripura; 126/8 (20 overs)
Priyam Garg 59* (49); Tushar Saha 2/33 (4 overs)		Manisankar Murasingh 28 (23); Ankit Rajpoot 4/17 (4 overs)

Uttar Pradesh won by 58 runs
Palam B Ground, Delhi
Umpires: Saiyed Khalid and Abhijit Deshmukh

- Uttar Pradesh won the toss and elected to bat.
- Ankit Chaudhary (Uttar Pradesh) made his T20 debut.

24 February 2019
Scorecard

Uttarakhand; 141/6 (20 overs)	v	Pondicherry; 131/9 (20 overs)
Vijay Sharma 30* (25); Fabid Ahmed 2/15 (4 overs)		Paras Dogra 53 (42); Himanshu Bisht 2/21 (4 overs)

Uttarakhand won by 10 runs
Palam A Ground, Delhi
Umpires: Nitin Pandit and Krishnamachari Srinivasan

- Uttarakhand won the toss and elected to bat.

=== Round 4 ===
25 February 2019
Scorecard

Baroda; 75 (18.2 overs)	v	Services; 76/3 (16.2 overs)
Swapnil Singh 17 (22); Vikas Yadav 3/15 (4 overs)		Ravi Chauhan 22 (20); Swapnil Singh 2/16 (4 overs)

Services won by 7 wickets
Palam A Ground, Delhi
Umpires: Abhijit Deshmukh and Krishnamachari Srinivasan

- Services won the toss and elected to field.

25 February 2019
Scorecard

Uttar Pradesh; 179/4 (20 overs)	v	Pondicherry; 102/6 (20 overs)
Priyam Garg 54 (30); Vikneshwaran Marimuthu 2/15 (2 overs)		Fabid Ahmed 25* (30); Saurabh Kumar 4/14 (4 overs)

Uttar Pradesh won by 77 runs
Palam B Ground, Delhi
Umpires: Nitin Pandit and Saiyed Khalid

- Uttar Pradesh won the toss and elected to bat.

25 February 2019
Scorecard

Hyderabad; 124/6 (overs)	v	Maharashtra; 125/3 (18 overs)
Rohit Rayudu 47* (34); Vishal Gite 2/30 (4 overs)		Ruturaj Gaikwad 54 (40); Palakodeti Sairam 2/38 (4 overs)

Maharashtra won by 7 wickets
Palam B Ground, Delhi
Umpires: Abhijit Deshmukh and Krishnamachari Srinivasan

- Hyderabad won the toss and elected to bat.

25 February 2019
Scorecard

Uttarakhand; 147/5 (20 overs)	v	Tripura; 110 (19 overs)
Karn Kaushal 58 (44); Sanjay Majumder 2/18 (4 overs)		Sen Chowdhary 34 (33); Rohit Dangwal 3/16 (3 overs)

Uttarakhand won by 37 runs
Palam A Ground, Delhi
Umpires: Nitin Pandit and Saiyed Khalid

- Tripura won the toss and elected to field.

=== Round 5 ===
27 February 2019
Scorecard

Tripura; 79/9 (20 overs)	v	Hyderabad; 80/2 (13.3 overs)
Sen Chowdhary 16 (18); Chama Milind 3/11 (3 overs)		Tanmay Agarwal 38* (41); Manisankar Murasingh 1/11 (3 overs)

Hyderabad won by 8 wickets
Palam A Ground, Delhi
Umpires: Saiyed Khalid and Pashchim Pathak

- Hyderabad won the toss and elected to field.
- Chaitanya Reddy (Hyderabad) made his T20 debut.

27 February 2019
Scorecard

Uttarakhand; 89 (18.1 overs)	v	Maharashtra; 90/0 (8.2 overs)
Rajat Bhatia 28 (28); Satyajeet Bachhav 4/18 (4 overs)		Rahul Tripathi 51* (28)

Maharashtra won by 10 wickets
Palam B Ground, Delhi
Umpires: Navdeep Singh and Krishnamachari Srinivasan

- Maharashtra won the toss and elected to field.

27 February 2019
Scorecard

Uttar Pradesh; 138/5 (20 overs)	v	Services; 137/6 (20 overs)
Samarth Singh 70 (63); Mohit Kumar 2/23 (4 overs)		Vikas Hathwala 39* (33); Yash Dayal 1/15 (2 overs)

Services won by 2 runs
Palam A Ground, Delhi
Umpires: Saiyed Khalid and Pashchim Pathak

- Uttar Pradesh won the toss and elected to bat.

27 February 2019
Scorecard

Pondicherry; 126/5 (20 overs)	v	Baroda; 128/6 (19.4 overs)
Paras Dogra 41 (30); Lukman Meriwala 2/22 (4 overs)		Kedar Devdhar 51 (48); Pankaj Singh 2/21 (2.4 overs)

Baroda won by 4 wickets
Palam B Ground, Delhi
Umpires: Navdeep Singh and Krishnamachari Srinivasan

- Pondicherry won the toss and elected to bat.
- Pratik Salunke (Baroda) and Satish Jangir (Pondicherry) both made their T20 debuts.

=== Round 6 ===
28 February 2019
Scorecard

Pondicherry; 102/9 (20 overs)	v	Tripura; 105/2 (17 overs)
Damodaren Rohit 54 (57); Rana Dutta 4/20 (4 overs)		Udiyan Bose 72* (54); Pratik Sargade 2/21 (4 overs)

Tripura won by 8 wickets
Palam A Ground, Delhi
Umpires: Pashchim Pathak and Krishnamachari Srinivasan

- Tripura won the toss and elected to field.

28 February 2019
Scorecard

Uttar Pradesh; 209/6 (20 overs)	v	Uttarakhand; 91 (16.3 overs)
Samarth Singh 75 (48); Sunny Rana 2/45 (4 overs)		Saurabh Rawat 30 (22); Saurabh Kumar 5/28 (3.3 overs)

Uttar Pradesh won by 118 runs
Palam B Ground, Delhi
Umpires: Saiyed Khalid and Navdeep Singh

- Uttarakhand won the toss and elected to field.
- Mayank Mishra (Uttarakhand) and Zeeshan Ansari (Uttar Pradesh) both made their T20 debuts.

28 February 2019
Scorecard

Baroda; 163/7 (20 overs)	v	Maharashtra; 164/3 (19.2 overs)
Kedar Devdhar 38 (20); Azim Kazi 2/33 (4 overs)		Rahul Tripathi 70 (49); Deepak Hooda 1/9 (2 overs)

Maharashtra won by 7 wickets
Palam B Ground, Delhi
Umpires: Pashchim Pathak and Krishnamachari Srinivasan

- Baroda won the toss and elected to bat.

28 February 2019
Scorecard

Hyderabad; 135/8 (20 overs)	v	Services; 141/6 (19.4 overs)
Akshath Reddy 34 (31); Rajat Paliwal 2/9 (2 overs)		Vikas Hathwala 61* (40); Mohammed Siraj 4/20 (4 overs)

Services won by 4 wickets
Palam A Ground, Delhi
Umpires: Saiyed Khalid and Navdeep Sidhu

- Services won the toss and elected to field.
- Tilak Varma (Hyderabad) made his T20 debut.

=== Round 7 ===
2 March 2019
Scorecard

Hyderabad; 57/2 (4.5 overs)	v	Uttarakhand

No result
Palam A Ground, Delhi
Umpires: Pashchim Pathak

- Uttarakhand won the toss and elected to field.
- Rain prevented any further play.
- Jamalpur Mallikarjun (Hyderabad), Gaurav Singh and Bhiguraj Pathania (Uttarakhand) all made their T20 debuts.

2 March 2019
Scorecard

Maharashtra; 50/3 (4 overs)	v	Tripura
Rahul Tripathi 16 (9); Kamal Das 1/9 (1 over)

No result
Palam B Ground, Delhi
Umpires: Navdeep Singh and Krishnamachari Srinivasan

- Tripura won the toss and elected to field.
- Rain prevented any further play.
- Hitesh Walunj (Maharashtra) made his T20 debut.

2 March 2019
Scorecard

Baroda; 76/2 (12.1 overs)	v	Uttar Pradesh
Kedar Devdhar 28 (21); Mohit Jangra 1/21 (3 overs)

No result
Palam A Ground, Delhi
Umpires: Navdeep Singh and Krishnamachari Srinivasan

- Baroda won the toss and elected to bat.
- Rain prevented any further play.
- Pratyush Kumar, Kartik Kakade (Baroda), Aryan Juyal and Mohit Jangra (Uttar Pradesh) all made their T20 debut.

2 March 2019
Scorecard

Services; 67/2 (11 overs)	v	Pondicherry
Nakul Verma 31 (25); Satish Jangir 2/8 (2 overs)

No result
Palam B Ground, Delhi
Umpires: Saiyed Khalid and Pashchim Pathak

- Pondicherry won the toss and elected to field.
- Rain prevented any further play.
- Ranjeet Darji (Services) made his T20 debut.
