= 2020–21 Vijay Hazare Trophy Group E =

Cricket tournament

- Dates: 21 February – 1 March 2021
- Administrator: BCCI
- Cricket format: List A cricket
- Tournament format: Round-robin
- Participants: 6

The 2020–21 Vijay Hazare Trophy was the 19th season of the Vijay Hazare Trophy, a List A cricket tournament in India. It was contested by 38 teams, divided into six groups, with six teams in Group E. Bengal, Chandigarh, Haryana, Jammu and Kashmir, Saurashtra and Services were placed in Group E, with all the matches taking place in Kolkata. Saurashtra won Group E to qualify for the knockout stage of the tournament.

== Points table ==
Team	Pld	W	L	T	NR	Pts	NRR
Saurashtra (Q)	5	4	1	0	0	16	+0.632
Chandigarh	5	3	2	0	0	12	–0.572
Services	5	2	3	0	0	8	+0.382
Jammu and Kashmir	5	2	3	0	0	8	+0.024
Bengal	5	2	3	0	0	8	–0.171
Haryana	5	2	3	0	0	8	-0.298

- Top team advanced to the Knockout Stage

== Fixtures ==
=== Round 1 ===
21 February 2021
Scorecard

Jammu & Kashmir; 279/9 (50 overs)	v	Saurashtra; 283/7 (49.1 overs)
Shubham Khajuria 68 (78); Dharmendrasinh Jadeja 3/50 (10 overs)		Chirag Jani 93* (79); Vivrant Sharma 2/33 (4 overs)

Saurashtra won by 3 wickets
Jadavpur University Campus 2nd Ground, Kolkata
Umpires: Nitin Pandit and Pranav Joshi

- Saurashtra won the toss and elected to field.
- Lone Nasir, Suryansh Raina and Vivrant Sharma (Jammu & Kashmir) all made their List A debuts.

21 February 2021
Scorecard

Haryana; 299/9 (50 overs)	v	Chandigarh; 300/7 (49.3 overs)
Himanshu Rana 102 (125); Jagjit Singh 3/36 (7 overs)		Manan Vohra 117 (120); Sumit Kumar 2/34 (8 overs)

Chandigarh won by 3 wickets
Videocon Academy Ground, Kolkata
Umpires: Anil Dandekar and Sanjay Kumar Singh

- Chandigarh won the toss and elected to field.
- Arslan Khan, Jagjit Singh, Mandeep Singh (Chandigarh) and Jaideep Bhambhu (Haryana) all made their List A debuts.

21 February 2021
Scorecard

Bengal; 315/6 (50 overs)	v	Services; 245 (49.4 overs)
Kaif Ahmed 75 (53); Varun Choudhary 2/54 (10 overs)		Rajat Paliwal 90 (102); Ishan Porel 2/31 (9 overs)

Bengal won by 70 runs
Eden Gardens, Kolkata
Umpires: GS Ananth Ramakrishnan and VM Dhokre

- Services won the toss and elected to field.
- Kaif Ahmed (Bengal) made his List A debut.

=== Round 2 ===
23 February 2021
Scorecard

Haryana; 264 (50 overs)	v	Saurashtra; 265/9 (49.1 overs)
Chaitanya Bishnoi 84 (116); Chetan Sakariya 3/63 (10 overs)		Snell Patel 79 (94); Mohit Sharma 2/30 (9.1 overs)

Saurashtra won by 1 wicket
Videocon Academy Ground, Kolkata
Umpires: GS Ananth Ramakrishnan and VM Dhokre

- Saurashtra won the toss and elected to field.
- Vivek Vashisth (Haryana) made his List A debut.

23 February 2021
Scorecard

Services; 274/7 (50 overs)	v	Jammu & Kashmir; 276/7 (48.3 overs)
Ravi Chauhan 118 (131); Umar Nazir Mir 2/37 (8 overs)		Shubham Khajuria 84 (91); Pulkit Narang 2/43 (10 overs)

Jammu & Kashmir won by 3 wickets
Jadavpur University Campus 2nd Ground, Kolkata
Umpires: Anil Dandekar and Sanjay Kumar Singh

- Jammu & Kashmir won the toss and elected to field.
- Mohit Kumar (Services) made his List A debut.

23 February 2021
Scorecard

Bengal; 253/9 (50 overs)	v	Chandigarh; 257/5 (48.5 overs)
Shahbaz Ahmed 59 (66); Gaurav Gambhir 2/45 (10 overs)		Arslan Khan 88 (95); Akash Deep 2/53 (9 overs)

Chandigarh won by 5 wickets
Eden Gardens, Kolkata
Umpires: Ranjeev Sharma and Rohan Pandit

- Chandigarh won the toss and elected to field.

=== Round 3 ===
25 February 2021
Scorecard

Haryana; 308/6 (50 overs)	v	Jammu & Kashmir; 295 (49.1 overs)
Shivam Chauhan 123 (131); Mujtaba Yousuf 2/53 (10 overs)		Parvez Rasool 86 (85); Arun Chaprana 4/35 (9.1 overs)

Haryana won by 13 runs
Eden Gardens, Kolkata
Umpires: GS Ananth Ramakrishnan and VM Dhokre

- Jammu & Kashmir won the toss and elected to field.
- Ashok Sandhu (Haryana) made his List A debut.

25 February 2021
Scorecard

Saurashtra; 324/9 (50 overs)	v	Bengal; 175 (37 overs)
Arpit Vasavada 91 (59); Ishan Porel 3/71 (10 overs)		Abhimanyu Easwaran 44 (61); Jaydev Unadkat 3/46 (8 overs)

Saurashtra won by 149 runs
Jadavpur University Campus 2nd Ground, Kolkata
Umpires: Nitin Pandit and Pranav Joshi

- Bengal won the toss and elected to field.
- Parth Chauhan (Saurashtra) made his List A debut.

25 February 2021
Scorecard

Chandigarh; 224/8 (50 overs)	v	Services; 219 (49.4 overs)
Gaurav Gambhir 44* (47); Rahul Singh 2/28 (10 overs)		Mohit Ahlawat 69 (73); Gaurav Gambhir 4/51 (9 overs)

Chandigarh won by 5 runs
Videocon Academy Ground, Kolkata
Umpires: Ranjeev Sharma and Rohan Pandit

- Services won the toss and elected to field.
- Raman Bishnoi (Chandigarh) made his List A debut.

=== Round 4 ===
27 February 2021
Scorecard

Services; 287/5 (50 overs)	v	Haryana; 175 (43.3 overs)
Rajat Paliwal 78* (76); Arun Chaprana 1/41 (10 overs)		Jayant Yadav 59 (69); Varun Choudhary 2/29 (8 overs)

Services won by 112 runs
Jadavpur University Campus 2nd Ground, Kolkata
Umpires: Nitin Pandit and Pranav Joshi

- Haryana won the toss and elected to field.
- Nitesh Hooda (Haryana) and Shivam Tiwari (Services) both made their List A debuts.

27 February 2021
Scorecard

Bengal; 368/4 (50 overs)	v	Jammu & Kashmir; 286 (45.3 overs)
Abhimanyu Easwaran 99 (105); Mujtaba Yousuf 2/79 (10 overs)		Abid Mushtaq 68 (64); Arnab Nandi 4/46 (10 overs)

Bengal won by 82 runs
Videocon Academy Ground, Kolkata
Umpires: Anil Dandekar and Sanjay Kumar Singh

- Jammu & Kashmir won the toss and elected to field.
- Aadil Rashid, Henan Nazir, Umran Malik, Usman Pandit (Jammu & Kashmir), Mohammed Kaif and Suvankar Bal (Bengal) all made their List A debuts.

27 February 2021
Scorecard

Saurashtra; 388/7 (50 overs)	v	Chandigarh; 326/7 (50 overs)
Prerak Mankad 174 (130); Jaskaran Singh 4/60 (9 overs)		Arslan Khan 61 (43); Dharmendrasinh Jadeja 2/40 (10 overs)

Saurashtra won by 62 runs
Eden Gardens, Kolkata
Umpires: Ranjeev Sharma and Rohan Pandit

- Chandigarh won the toss and elected to field.

=== Round 5 ===
1 March 2021
Scorecard

Bengal; 177 (45.1 overs)	v	Haryana; 178/5 (43.3 overs)
Suvankar Bal 54 (67); Sanjay Pahal 3/32 (7.1 overs)		Chaitanya Bishnoi 57 (59); Shahbaz Ahmed 3/35 (10 overs)

Haryana won by 5 wickets
Eden Gardens, Kolkata
Umpires: GS Ananth Ramakrishnan and VM Dhokre

- Haryana won the toss and elected to field.

1 March 2021
Scorecard

Chandigarh; 241 (48.3 overs)	v	Jammu & Kashmir; 245/2 (34 overs)
Manan Vohra 54 (49); Parvez Rasool 3/27 (10 overs)		Shubham Khajuria 120 (86); Jaskaran Singh 1/28 (5 overs)

Jammu & Kashmir won by 8 wickets
Jadavpur University Campus 2nd Ground, Kolkata
Umpires: Anil Dandekar and Sanjay Kumar Singh

- Chandigarh won the toss and elected to bat.
- Asif Manzoor (Jammu & Kashmir) and Bhagmender Lather (Chandigarh) both made their List A debuts.

1 March 2021
Scorecard

Services; 301/7 (50 overs)	v	Saurashtra; 233 (43.1 overs)
Rahul Singh 158 (130); Jaydev Unadkat 3/51 (10 overs)		Chirag Jani 68 (64); Rahul Singh 4/45 (10 overs)

Services won by 68 runs
Videocon Academy Ground, Kolkata
Umpires: Nitin Pandit and Pranav Joshi

- Saurashtra won the toss and elected to field.
- Parth Bhut (Saurashtra) made his List A debut.
