= 2019–20 Syed Mushtaq Ali Trophy Group A =

Cricket tournament

- Dates: 8 – 17 November 2019
- Administrator(s): BCCI
- Cricket format: Twenty20 cricket
- Tournament format(s): Round-robin
- Participants: 7

The 2019–20 Syed Mushtaq Ali Trophy was the eleventh season of the Syed Mushtaq Ali Trophy, a Twenty20 cricket tournament in India. It was contested by 38 teams, divided into five groups, with seven teams in Group A. The group stage started on 8 November 2019. The top two teams from Group A progressed to the Super League section of the competition.

A day before the start of tournament, Goa sacked their captain C. M. Gautam after he was arrested due to his alleged involvement in match fixing in Karnataka Premier League. Darshan Misal was appointed as their new captain. On the opening day of the tournament, Karnataka beat Uttarakhand by nine wickets, setting a new record for the most consecutive wins in T20 matches in India, with fifteen.

Following the conclusion of matches played on 17 November 2019, Baroda and Karnataka had progressed to the Super League stage of the tournament.

== Points table ==
Team	Pld	W	L	T	NR	Pts	NRR
Baroda	6	5	1	0	0	20	+1.351
Karnataka	6	5	1	0	0	20	+2.052
Services	6	4	2	0	0	16	+0.234
Andhra	6	3	3	0	0	12	+0.797
Uttarakhand	6	2	4	0	0	8	−0.448
Goa	6	2	4	0	0	8	−0.917
Bihar	6	0	6	0	0	0	−2.972

- Top two teams advanced to the Super League

== Fixtures ==
=== Round 1 ===
8 November 2019
Scorecard

Uttarakhand; 132/6 (20 overs)	v	Karnataka; 133/1 (15.4 overs)
Tanmay Srivastava 39 (40); Shreyas Gopal 2/20 (3 overs)		Rohan Kadam 67* (55); Pradeep Chamoli 1/25 (3.4 overs)

Karnataka won by 9 wickets
Dr. Y. S. Rajasekhara Reddy ACA–VDCA Cricket Stadium, Visakhapatnam
Umpires: Navdeep Singh and Sadashiv Iyer

- Uttarakhand won the toss and elected to bat.
- Devdutt Padikkal (Karnataka), Arya Sethi, Avneesh Sudha, Dikshanshu Negi, Dhanraj Sharma, Akash Madhwal and Pradeep Chamoli (Uttarakhand) all made their T20 debuts.

8 November 2019
Scorecard

Bihar; 97/7 (20 overs)	v	Andhra; 98/0 (11.5 overs)
MD Rahmatullah 44* (35); K. V. Sasikanth 3/20 (4 overs)		Ashwin Hebbar 52* (39)

Andhra won by 10 wickets
Dr PVG Raju ACA Sports Complex, Vizianagaram
Umpires: Saiyed Khalid and Kamlesh Sharma

- Andhra won the toss and elected to field.
- Anshuman Gautam, Rajesh Singh, Shivam Kumar and Vipul Krishna (Bihar) all made their T20 debuts.

8 November 2019
Scorecard

Baroda; 149/9 (20 overs)	v	Goa; 152/6 (19.4 overs)
Swapnil Singh 50 (44); Amit Verma 2/19 (4 overs)		Suyash Prabhudessai 60* (49); Atit Sheth 3/29 (4 overs)

Goa won by 4 wickets
Dr. Y. S. Rajasekhara Reddy ACA–VDCA Cricket Stadium, Visakhapatnam
Umpires: Navdeep Singh and Sadashiv Iyer

- Baroda won the toss and elected to bat.
- Heramb Parab and Shubham Desai (Goa) both made their T20 debuts.

=== Round 2 ===
9 November 2019
Scorecard

Baroda; 196/4 (20 overs)	v	Karnataka; 182/9 (20 overs)
Kedar Devdhar 52 (38); Krishnappa Gowtham 2/22 (3 overs)		Rohan Kadam 57 (40); Lukman Meriwala 5/21 (4 overs)

Baroda won by 14 runs
Dr. Y. S. Rajasekhara Reddy ACA–VDCA Cricket Stadium, Visakhapatnam
Umpires: Sadashiv Iyer and Saiyed Khalid

- Karnataka won the toss and elected to field.
- Prateek Jain (Karnataka) made his T20 debut.

9 November 2019
Scorecard

Goa; 202/4 (20 overs)	v	Bihar; 173/8 (20 overs)
Snehal Kauthankar 55 (35); Vipul Krishna 2/47 (3 overs)		Rajesh Singh 64 (28); Heramb Parab 3/21 (4 overs)

Goa won by 29 runs
Dr PVG Raju ACA Sports Complex, Vizianagaram
Umpires: Kamlesh Sharma and Navdeep Singh

- Bihar won the toss and elected to field.

9 November 2019
Scorecard

Uttarakhand; 134/8 (20 overs)	v	Services; 137/4 (18.5 overs)
Tanmay Srivastava 67 (46); Varun Choudhary 2/20 (4 overs)		Ravi Chauhan 67 (49); Himanshu Bisht 1/14 (3 overs)

Services won by 6 wickets
Dr. Y. S. Rajasekhara Reddy ACA–VDCA Cricket Stadium, Visakhapatnam
Umpires: Sadashiv Iyer and Saiyed Khalid

- Services won the toss and elected to field.
- Pulkit Narang, Varun Choudhary (Services) and Harshit Shatrughan Bisht (Uttarakhand) all made their T20 debuts.

=== Round 3 ===
11 November 2019
Scorecard

Services; 184/7 (20 overs)	v	Bihar; 90/9 (20 overs)
Ravi Chauhan 71 (54); Sarfaraz Ashraf 3/35 (4 overs)		Babul Kumar 21 (14); Varun Choudhary 2/15 (3 overs)

Services won by 94 runs
Dr. Y. S. Rajasekhara Reddy ACA–VDCA Cricket Stadium, Visakhapatnam
Umpires: Saiyed Khalid and Sadashiv Iyer

- Bihar won the toss and elected to field.
- Eshaan Ravi and Shashi Shekhar (Bihar) both made their T20 debuts.

11 November 2019
Scorecard

Baroda; 201/4 (20 overs)	v	Uttarakhand; 168 (19.2 overs)
Deepak Hooda 52 (36); Dikshanshu Negi 2/33 (4 overs)		Saurabh Rawat 70 (36); Swapnil Singh 3/25 (4 overs)

Baroda won by 33 runs
Dr PVG Raju ACA Sports Complex, Vizianagaram
Umpires: Kamlesh Sharma and Navdeep Singh

- Uttarakhand won the toss and elected to field.

11 November 2019
Scorecard

Andhra; 184/5 (20 overs)	v	Karnataka; 189/5 (18.5 overs)
Prasanth Kumar 79 (51); Vasuki Koushik 3/35 (4 overs)		Devdutt Padikkal 122* (60); Cheepurapalli Stephen 2/39 (4 overs)

Karnataka won by 5 wickets
Dr. Y. S. Rajasekhara Reddy ACA–VDCA Cricket Stadium, Visakhapatnam
Umpires: Saiyed Khalid and Sadashiv Iyer

- Karnataka won the toss and elected to field.
- Kranthi Kumar and Manish Golamaru (Andhra) both made their T20 debuts.

=== Round 4 ===
12 November 2019
Scorecard

Andhra; 168/6 (20 overs)	v	Baroda; 172/3 (18.5 overs)
Kranthi Kumar 47 (24); Lukman Meriwala 3/22 (4 overs)		Aditya Waghmode 82* (57); Naren Reddy 1/24 (3 overs)

Baroda won by 7 wickets
Dr. Y. S. Rajasekhara Reddy ACA–VDCA Cricket Stadium, Visakhapatnam
Umpires: Kamlesh Sharma and Navdeep Singh

- Baroda won the toss and elected to field.

12 November 2019
Scorecard

Karnataka; 250/3 (20 overs)	v	Services; 170/7 (20 overs)
Manish Pandey 129* (54); Diwesh Pathania 1/28 (4 overs)		Ravi Chauhan 54 (35); Shreyas Gopal 5/19 (4 overs)

Karnataka won by 80 runs
Dr PVG Raju ACA Sports Complex, Vizianagaram
Umpires: Sadashiv Iyer and Saiyed Khalid

- Services won the toss and elected to field.

12 November 2019
Scorecard

Goa; 119/9 (20 overs)	v	Uttarakhand; 120/2 (16.4 overs)
Snehal Kauthankar 57 (46); Mayank Mishra 4/6 (4 overs)		Tanmay Srivastava 49* (39); Amulya Pandrekar 1/20 (2.4 overs)

Uttarakhand won by 8 wickets
Dr. Y. S. Rajasekhara Reddy ACA–VDCA Cricket Stadium, Visakhapatnam
Umpires: Kamlesh Sharma and Navdeep Singh

- Uttarakhand won the toss and elected to field.

=== Round 5 ===
14 November 2019
Scorecard

Services; 190/6 (20 overs)	v	Goa; 169 (19.5 overs)
Lakhan Singh 81 (50); Malliksab Sirur 5/33 (4 overs)		Snehal Kauthankar 44 (33); Mohit Kumar 3/33 (4 overs)

Services won by 21 runs
Dr. Y. S. Rajasekhara Reddy ACA–VDCA Cricket Stadium, Visakhapatnam
Umpires: Navdeep Singh and Sadashiv Iyer

- Goa won the toss and elected to field.
- Prathamesh Gawas (Goa) made his T20 debut.

14 November 2019
Scorecard

Uttarakhand; 129/8 (20 overs)	v	Andhra; 130/6 (18.5 overs)
Tanmay Srivastava 57* (45); Bandaru Ayyappa 2/19 (4 overs)		Srikar Bharat 47 (33); Akash Madhwal 3/29 (3.5 overs)

Andhra won by 4 wickets
Dr PVG Raju ACA Sports Complex, Vizianagaram
Umpires: Saiyed Khalid and Kamlesh Sharma

- Andhra won the toss and elected to field.

14 November 2019
Scorecard

Bihar; 124/7 (20 overs)	v	Baroda; 125/0 (12.3 overs)
Kunal Dabas 45 (40); Lukman Meriwala 3/16 (4 overs)		Kedar Devdhar 64* (41)

Baroda won by 10 wickets
Dr. Y. S. Rajasekhara Reddy ACA–VDCA Cricket Stadium, Visakhapatnam
Umpires: Navdeep Singh and Sadashiv Iyer

- Bihar won the toss and elected to bat.
- Kunal Dabas and Harsh Singh (Bihar) both made their T20 debuts.

=== Round 6 ===
15 November 2019
Scorecard

Goa; 113 (19.3 overs)	v	Andhra; 114/1 (13 overs)
Suyash Prabhudessai 32 (23); KV Sasikanth 3/20 (4 overs)		Srikar Bharat 76 (44); Malliksab Sirur 1/33 (3 overs)

Andhra won by 9 wickets
Dr. Y. S. Rajasekhara Reddy ACA–VDCA Cricket Stadium, Visakhapatnam
Umpires: Kamlesh Sharma and Navdeep Singh

- Andhra won the toss and elected to field.

15 November 2019
Scorecard

Baroda; 195/6 (20 overs)	v	Services; 160/8 (20 overs)
Deepak Hooda 68 (39); Varun Choudhary 2/48 (4 overs)		Rahul Singh 39 (19); Ninad Rathva 3/24 (4 overs)

Baroda won by 35 runs
Dr PVG Raju ACA Sports Complex, Vizianagaram
Umpires: Saiyed Khalid and Sadashiv Iyer

- Services won the toss and elected to field.

15 November 2019
Scorecard

Bihar; 106 (19.3 overs)	v	Karnataka; 107/1 (11.2 overs)
Babul Kumar 41 (34); Shreyas Gopal 2/16 (4 overs)		Karun Nair 65* (36); Abhijeet Saket 1/33 (3.2 overs)

Karnataka won by 9 wickets
Dr. Y. S. Rajasekhara Reddy ACA–VDCA Cricket Stadium, Visakhapatnam
Umpires: Kamlesh Sharma and Navdeep Singh

- Bihar won the toss and elected to bat.
- Abhijeet Saket (Bihar) made his T20 debut.

=== Round 7 ===
17 November 2019
Scorecard

Bihar; 134/8 (20 overs)	v	Uttarakhand; 138/4 (19.1 overs)
MD Rahmatullah 64 (45); Akash Madhwal 2/18 (4 overs)		Karn Kaushal 56* (47); Shashi Shekhar 2/25 (4 overs)

Uttarakhand won by 6 wickets
Dr. Y. S. Rajasekhara Reddy ACA–VDCA Cricket Stadium, Visakhapatnam
Umpires: Saiyed Khalid and Sadashiv Iyer

- Uttarakhand won the toss and elected to field.
- Ashish Joshi (Uttarakhand) made his T20 debut.

17 November 2019
Scorecard

Karnataka; 172/9 (20 overs)	v	Goa; 137 (19.3 overs)
Pavan Deshpande 63 (32); Heramb Parab 5/24 (4 overs)		Aditya Kaushik 48 (43); Shreyas Gopal 3/14 (4 overs)

Karnataka won by 35 runs
Dr PVG Raju ACA Sports Complex, Vizianagaram
Umpires: Kamlesh Sharma and Navdeep Singh

- Goa won the toss and elected to field.

17 November 2019
Scorecard

Andhra; 147/7 (20 overs)	v	Services; 151/5 (18.4 overs)
Naren Reddy 43 (23); Mohit Kumar 2/27 (4 overs)		Rahul Singh 41 (23); KV Sasikanth 3/32 (3 overs)

Services won by 5 wickets
Dr. Y. S. Rajasekhara Reddy ACA–VDCA Cricket Stadium, Visakhapatnam
Umpires: Saiyed Khalid and Sadashiv Iyer

- Andhra won the toss and elected to bat.
- Navneet Singh (Services) made his T20 debut.
