= 2021–22 Ranji Trophy Group E =

Cricket tournament

- Dates: 17 February – 26 June 2022
- Administrator(s): BCCI
- Cricket format: First-class cricket
- Tournament format(s): Round-robin then knockout
- Participants: 4

The 2021–22 Ranji Trophy was the 87th season of the Ranji Trophy, the premier first-class cricket tournament in India. It was contested by 38 teams, divided into eight groups, with four teams in Group E. All the Group E league matches took place in Trivandrum. The tournament was announced by the Board of Control for Cricket in India (BCCI) on 3 July 2021. Uttarakhand won Group R to progress to the knockout stage of the tournament.

== Points table ==
Pos	Team	Pld	W	L	T	D	NR	Pts	Quot
1	Uttarakhand	3	2	1	0	0	0	12	1.398
2	Andhra Pradesh	3	1	1	0	1	0	9	1.183
3	Services	3	1	1	0	1	0	8	0.872
4	Rajasthan	3	1	2	0	0	0	6	0.723

Updated to match(es) played on 6 March 2022. Source: ESPN Cricinfo

Advances to Quarter-final

== Fixtures ==
=== Round 1 ===
17–20 February 2022
Scorecard

Rajasthan	v	Andhra Pradesh
275 (59.2 overs); Rajesh Bishnoi 54 (42); CV Stephen 5/51 (13 overs)		224 (86.2 overs); Uppara Girinath 71 (217); Aniket Choudhary 4/40 (18.2 overs)
316 (92.2 overs); Ashok Menaria 79 (112); KV Sasikanth 3/75 (23 overs)		209 (53.3 overs); Pinninti Tapaswi 44 (62); Shubham Sharma 4/32 (12 overs)

Rajasthan won by 158 runs
St Xavier's College Ground, Thumba
Umpires: Abhijit Bengeri and GS Ananth Ramakrishnan
Player of the match: Ashok Menaria (Rajasthan)

- Rajasthan won the toss and elected to bat.
- Anirudh Singh, Manav Suthar (Rajasthan), Pinninti Tapaswi, Tripurana Vijay and Yara Sandeep (Andhra Pradesh) all made their first-class debuts.

17–20 February 2022
Scorecard

Services	v	Uttarakhand
176 (78.4 overs); Devender Lochab 76 (185); Deepak Dhapola 4/24 (19 overs)		248 (79.2 overs); Kamal Singh 82 (150); Arjun Sharma 3/31 (10.2 overs)
204 (83.5 overs); Hardik Sethi 56 (134); Dikshanshu Negi 3/22 (11 overs)		136/1 (28.3 overs); Jay Bista 87* (87); Arjun Sharma 1/31 (5 overs)

Uttarakhand won by 9 wickets
Greenfield International Stadium, Thiruvananthapuram
Umpires: Belur Ravi and KR Vasuki
Player of the match: Dikshanshu Negi (Uttarakhand)

- Uttarakhand won the toss and elected to field.
- Nitin Yadav (Services) made his first-class debut.

=== Round 2 ===
24–27 February 2022
Scorecard

Andhra Pradesh	v	Services
389 (137.1 overs); Ricky Bhui 149 (267); Pulkit Narang 6/56 (25.1 overs)		343 (118.4 overs); Rajat Paliwal 96 (184); Siraparapu Ashish 4/91 (29.4 overs)
220/4 (68 overs); Chengalpet Gnaneshwar 125 (195); Pulkit Narang 2/55 (19 overs)

Match drawn
St Xavier's College Ground, Thumba
Umpires: Dharmesh Bhardwaj and Akshay Totre
Player of the match: Ricky Bhui (Andhra Pradesh)

- Andhra Pradesh won the toss and elected to bat.
- Shaik Rasheed (Andhra Pradesh) made his first-class debut.

24–27 February 2022
Scorecard

Uttarakhand	v	Rajasthan
337 (130.3 overs); Swapnil Singh 97 (301); Aniket Choudhary 3/44 (24.5 overs)		129 (51.2 overs); Manender Singh 52 (113); Mayank Mishra 7/44 (23.2 overs)
246/7d (53 overs); Jay Bista 88 (85); Tanveer Ul-Haq 2/9 (5 overs)		155 (68.4 overs); Ashok Menaria 45 (89); Mayank Mishra 4/26 (19 overs)

Uttarakhand won by 299 runs
Greenfield International Stadium, Thiruvananthapuram
Umpires: GS Ananth Ramakrishnan and KR Vasuki
Player of the match: Mayank Mishra (Uttarakhand)

- Rajasthan won the toss and elected to field.
- Kamlesh Nagarkoti (Rajasthan) and Tanush Gusain (Uttarakhand) both made their first-class debuts.

=== Round 3 ===
3–6 March 2022
Scorecard

Uttarakhand	v	Andhra Pradesh
194 (61.1 overs); Kunal Chandela 52 (98); Bandary Ayyappa 4/37 (23 overs)		226 (85 overs); Shaik Rasheed 56 (163); Deepak Dhapola 4/80 (27 overs)
101 (51.4 overs); Kunal Chandela 36 (104); Cheepurapalli Stephen 5/27 (19 overs)		70/2 (18.1 overs); CR Gnaneshwar 42* (58); Swapnil Singh 1/7 (2.1 overs)

Andhra Pradesh won by 8 wickets
St Xavier's College Ground, Thumba
Umpires: Belur Ravi and Akshay Totre
Player of the match: Cheepurapalli Stephen (Andhra Pradesh)

- Uttarakhand won the toss and elected to bat.
- Deepesh Nainwal (Uttarakhand) made his first-class debut.

3–6 March 2022
Scorecard

Rajasthan	v	Services
92 (45.2 overs); Ashok Menaria 31 (88); Diwesh Pathania 3/24 (10 overs)		301 (113.2 overs); Rajat Paliwal 91 (167); Manav Suthar 4/82 (34 overs)
210 (94.5 overs); Amitkumar Gautam 68 (176); Rahul Singh 3/57 (25.5 overs)		2/0 (1 over); Shivam Tiwari 2* (6)

Services won by 10 wickets
Greenfield International Stadium, Thiruvananthapuram
Umpires: Abhijit Bengeri and Dharmesh Bhardwaj
Player of the match: Rajat Paliwal (Services)

- Services won the toss and elected to field.
- Samarpit Joshi (Rajasthan) and Shivam Tiwari (Services) both made their first-class debuts.
