= 2022–23 Vijay Hazare Trophy Group D =

Cricket tournament

- Dates: 12 November – 2 December 2022
- Administrator: BCCI
- Cricket format: List A cricket
- Tournament format: Round-robin
- Participants: 8

The 2022–23 Vijay Hazare Trophy is the twenty first season of the Vijay Hazare Trophy, a List A cricket tournament that is being played in India. It was contested by 38 teams, divided into five groups, with seven teams in Group D. The tournament was announced by the BCCI on 8 August 2022.

== Points table ==
| Pos | Team | Pld | W | L | NR | Pts | NRR |
|---|---|---|---|---|---|---|---|
| 1 | Punjab | 6 | 6 | 0 | 0 | 24 | 1.759 |
| 2 | Jammu and Kashmir | 6 | 5 | 1 | 0 | 20 | 0.474 |
| 3 | Madhya Pradesh | 6 | 4 | 2 | 0 | 16 | 2.352 |
| 4 | Baroda | 6 | 3 | 3 | 0 | 12 | −0.396 |
| 5 | Uttarakhand | 6 | 2 | 4 | 0 | 8 | −0.186 |
| 6 | Odisha | 6 | 1 | 5 | 0 | 4 | −0.537 |
| 7 | Nagaland | 6 | 0 | 6 | 0 | 0 | −3.312 |

Source: ESPN Cricinfo
Rules for classification: 1) Points; 2) Head-to-head; 3) Net run rate.

Advances to Quarter-final
Advances to Preliminary quarter-final

== Fixtures ==
=== Round 1 ===
12 November 2022
Scorecard

| Odisha; 178 (44.2 overs) | v | Uttarakhand; 179/6 (42 overs) |
| Subhranshu Senapati 60 (76); Himanshu Bisht 4/26 (9 overs) | | Dikshanshu Negi 80* (111); Debabrata Pradhan 2/20 (5 overs) |

Uttarakhand won by 4 wickets
Bandra Kurla Complex Ground, Mumbai
Umpires: Ulhas Gandhe and Puttarangaiah Jayapal

- Uttarakhand won the toss and elected to field.
- Saurabh Kanojia (Odisha) and Rajan Kumar (Uttarakhand) both made their List A debuts.

12 November 2022
Scorecard

| Madhya Pradesh; 342/9 (50 overs) | v | Jammu and Kashmir; 346/8 (49.2 overs) |
| Yash Dubey 121 (121); Sharukh Dar 3/66 (10 overs) | | Vivrant Sharma 69 (62); Avesh Khan 3/86 (10 overs) |

Jammu and Kashmir won by 2 wickets
DY Patil Stadium, Mumbai
Umpires: Sadashiv Iyer and Vineet Kulkarni

- Jammu and Kashmir won the toss and elected to field.
- Ashwin Das, Akshat Raghuwanshi (Madhya Pradesh), Sharukh Dar, Sahil Lotra and Yudhvir Singh (Jammu and Kashmir) all made their List A debuts.

12 November 2022
Scorecard

| Baroda; 259 (50 overs) | v | Nagaland; 92 (30.3 overs) |
| Atit Sheth 87 (106); Akash Singh 5/38 (9 overs) | | Shrikant Mundhe 23 (39); Ninad Rathva 3/11 (4 overs) |

Baroda won by 167 runs
Wankhede Stadium, Mumbai
Umpires: Saiyed Khalid and Madanagopal Kuppuraj

- Nagaland won the toss and elected to field.
- Jyotsnil Singh (Baroda) made his List A debut.

=== Round 2 ===
13 November 2022
Scorecard

| Jammu and Kashmir; 282/6 (49 overs) | v | Baroda; 188 (43.2 overs) |
| Abdul Samad 64 (52); Varun Aaron 2/51 (9 overs) | | Ambati Rayudu 49 (63); Vivrant Sharma 4/22 (4.2 overs) |

Jammu and Kashmir won by 94 runs
Bandra Kurla Complex Ground, Mumbai
Umpires: Saiyed Khalid and Vineet Kulkarni

- Jammu and Kashmir won the toss and elected to bat.
- The match was reduced to 49 overs per side due to rain.

13 November 2022
Scorecard

| Uttarakhand; 255 (49.1 (overs) | v | Punjab; 256/4 (45.4 overs) |
| Avneesh Sudha 51 (64); Abhishek Sharma 3/31 (10 overs) | | Mandeep Singh 100 (111); Deepak Dhapola 1/20 (7 overs) |

Punjab won by 6 wickets
DY Patil Stadium, Mumbai
Umpires: Sadashiv Iyer and Puttarangaiah Jayapal

- Punjab won the toss and elected to field.

13 November 2022
Scorecard

| Odisha; 224 (48.3 overs) | v | Nagaland; 89 (35.5 overs) |
| Rajesh Dhuper 79 (114); Akash Singh 5/29 (9.3 overs) | | Joshua Ozukum 30 (52); Tarani Sa 5/19 (7 overs) |

Odisha won by 135 runs
Wankhede Stadium, Mumbai
Umpires: Ulhas Gandhe and Madanagopal Kuppuraj

- Nagaland won the toss and elected to field.

=== Round 3 ===
15 November 2022
Scorecard

| Baroda; 81 (20.4 overs) | v | Punjab; 82/1 (12 overs) |
| Jyotsnil Singh 29 (47); Ramandeep Singh 5/17 (4 overs) | | Prabhsimran Singh 62* (48); Varun Aaron 1/33 (3 overs) |

Punjab won by 9 wickets
Bandra Kurla Complex Ground, Mumbai
Umpires: Saiyed Khalid and Vineet Kulkarni

- Baroda won the toss and elected to bat.
- Gaurav Chaudhary (Punjab) made his List A debut.

15 November 2022
Scorecard

| Jammu and Kashmir; 295/9 (50 overs) | v | Nagaland; 196 (44.3 overs) |
| Fazil Rashid 87 (86); Chopise Hopongkyu 4/59 (10 overs) | | Chetan Bist 51 (64); Yudhvir Singh 4/54 (10 overs) |

Jammu and Kashmir won by 99 runs
DY Patil Stadium, Mumbai
Umpires: Ulhas Gandhe and Madanagopal Kuppuraj

- Nagaland won the toss and elected to field.

15 November 2022
Scorecard

| Odisha; 172 (41.1 overs) | v | Madhya Pradesh; 175/4 (31.5 overs) |
| Subhranshu Senapati 55 (66); Kuldeep Sen 4/28 (6 overs) | | Shubham Sharma 69 (75); Rajesh Mohanty 2/35 (8 overs) |

Madhya Pradesh won by 6 wickets
Wankhede Stadium, Mumbai
Umpires: Sadashiv Iyer and Puttarangaiah Jayapal

- Madhya Pradesh won the toss and elected to field.
- Anubhav Agarwal (Madhya Pradesh) made his List A debut.

=== Round 4 ===
17 November 2022
Scorecard

| Madhya Pradesh; 276/8 (50 overs) | v | Uttarakhand; 266/9 (50 overs) |
| Shubham Sharma 100 (110); Swapnil Singh 4/60 (10 overs) | | Swapnil Singh 82 (89); Kuldeep Sen 4/51 (10 overs) |

Madhya Pradesh won by 10 runs
Bandra Kurla Complex Ground, Mumbai
Umpires: Sadashiv Iyer and Vineet Kulkarni

- Uttarakhand won the toss and elected to field.
- Ritesh Shakya (Madhya Pradesh) made his List A debut.

17 November 2022
Scorecard

| Baroda; 284/7 (50 overs) | v | Odisha; 136 (35.3 overs) |
| Vishnu Solanki 69 (63); Rajesh Mohanty 2/32 (8 overs) | | Rajesh Dhuper 49 (64); Lukman Meriwala 4/35 (10 overs) |

Baroda won by 148 runs
DY Patil Stadium, Mumbai
Umpires: Saiyed Khalid and Madanagopal Kuppuraj

- Odisha won the toss and elected to field.
- Mustaq Beg (Odisha) made his List A debut.

17 November 2022
Scorecard

| Jammu and Kashmir; 227 (47.4 overs) | v | Punjab; 231/2 (28.4 overs) |
| Shubham Khajuria 72 (78); Baltej Singh 3/26 (10 overs) | | Anmolpreet Singh 101* (63); Auqib Nabi 1/49 (8 overs) |

Punjab won by 8 wickets
Wankhede Stadium, Mumbai
Umpires: Ulhas Gandhe and Puttarangaiah Jayapal

- Punjab won the toss and elected to field.

=== Round 5 ===
19 November 2022
Scorecard

| Odisha; 268/6 (50 overs) | v | Jammu and Kashmir; 269/7 (48.5 overs) |
| Abhishek Raut 75 (99); Yudhvir Singh 3/71 (10 overs) | | Shubham Khajuria 78 (77); Tarani Sa 3/35 (9 overs) |

Jammu and Kashmir won by 3 wickets
Bandra Kurla Complex Ground, Mumbai
Umpires: Ulhas Gandhe and Madanagopal Kuppuraj

- Jammu and Kashmir won the toss and elected to field.

19 November 2022
Scorecard

| Nagaland; 146 (44 overs) | v | Uttarakhand; 148/3 (24.5 overs) |
| Rongsen Jonathan 48 (95); Avneesh Sudha 3/33 (7 overs) | | Avneesh Sudha 52* (62); Imliwati Lemtur 1/25 (7 overs) |

Uttarakhand won by 7 wickets
DY Patil Stadium, Mumbai
Umpires: Saiyed Khalid and Vineet Kulkarni

- Uttarakhand won the toss and elected to field.
- Piyush Joshi (Uttarakhand) made his List A debut.

19 November 2022
Scorecard

| Punjab; 232 (49.3 overs) | v | Madhya Pradesh; 206 (47.1 overs) |
| Mandeep Singh 90 (97); Kuldeep Sen 5/36 (9.3 overs) | | Saransh Jain 43 (48); Siddarth Kaul 3/42 (9 overs) |

Punjab won by 26 runs
Wankhede Stadium, Mumbai
Umpires: Sadashiv Iyer and Puttarangaiah Jayapal

- Madhya Pradesh won the toss and elected to field.

=== Round 6 ===
21 November 2022
Scorecard

| Madhya Pradesh; 424/3 (50 overs) | v | Nagaland; 103 (28.1 overs) |
| Yash Dubey 195* (150); Rongsen Jonathan 2/60 (10 overs) | | Hokaito Zhimomi 34 (48); Shubham Sharma 4/21 (5 overs) |

Madhya Pradesh won by 321 runs
Bandra Kurla Complex Ground, Mumbai
Umpires: Sadashiv Iyer and Puttarangaiah Jayapal

- Nagaland won the toss and elected to field.
- Himanshu Mantri (Madhya Pradesh) made his List A debut.

21 November 2022
Scorecard

| Odisha; 251/7 (50 overs) | v | Punjab; 252/5 (46.4 overs) |
| Kartik Biswal 107* (112); Siddarth Kaul 3/57 (10 overs) | | Mandeep Singh 91* (98); Prayash Singh 4/51 (9.4 overs) |

Punjab won by 5 wickets
DY Patil Stadium, Mumbai
Umpires: Ulhas Gandhe and Vineet Kulkarni

- Punjab won the toss and elected to field.
- B. Shiva (Odisha) made his List A debut.

21 November 2022
Scorecard

| Uttarakhand; 109 (29.1 overs) | v | Baroda; 110/4 (21.3 overs) |
| Dikshanshu Negi 50 (67); Varun Aaron 4/37 (9.1 overs) | | Vishnu Solanki 28* (35); Abhay Negi 2/25 (5 overs) |

Baroda won by 6 wickets
Wankhede Stadium, Mumbai
Umpires: Saiyed Khalid and Madanagopal Kuppuraj

- Baroda won the toss and elected to field.

=== Round 7 ===
23 November 2022
Scorecard

| Nagaland; 145 (48.5 overs) | v | Punjab; 146/4 (29.3 overs) |
| Chetan Bist 47 (89); Mayank Markande 3/20 (10 overs) | | Anmolpreet Singh 65 (59); Rongsen Jonathan 3/44 (9.3 overs) |

Punjab won by 6 wickets
Bandra Kurla Complex Ground, Mumbai
Umpires: Madanagopal Kuppuraj and Ulhas Gandhe

- Nagaland won the toss and elected to bat.
- Renjamo Mozhui (Nagaland) made his List A debut.

23 November 2022
Scorecard

| Madhya Pradesh; 349/7 (50 overs) | v | Baroda; 59 (17.1 overs) |
| Shubham Sharma 88 (85); Lukman Meriwala 2/61 (10 overs) | | Aditya Waghmode 9 (10); Avesh Khan 6/37 (8 overs) |

Madhya Pradesh won by 290 runs
DY Patil Stadium, Mumbai
Umpires: Sadashiv Iyer and Vineet Kulkarni

- Baroda won the toss and elected to field.

23 November 2022
Scorecard

| Uttarakhand; 251/6 (50 overs) | v | Jammu and Kashmir; 257/1 (42.2 overs) |
| Priyanshu Khanduri 97 (125); Auqib Nabi 3/48 (10 overs) | | Vivrant Sharma 154* (124) |

Jammu and Kashmir won by 9 wickets
Wankhede Stadium, Mumbai
Umpires: Puttarangaiah Jayapal and Saiyed Khalid

- Jammu and Kashmir won the toss and elected to field.
- Musaif Ajaz (Jammu and Kashmir) made his List A debut.
