= 2020–21 Syed Mushtaq Ali Trophy Group D =

Cricket tournament

2019–20 Syed Mushtaq Ali Trophy Group D
- Dates: 11 – 19 January 2021
- Administrator(s): BCCI
- Cricket format: Twenty20 cricket
- Tournament format(s): Round-robin
- Participants: 6

The 2020–21 Syed Mushtaq Ali Trophy was the twelfth season of the Syed Mushtaq Ali Trophy, a Twenty20 cricket tournament played in India. It was contested by 38 teams, divided into six groups, with six teams in Group D. Goa, Madhya Pradesh, Rajasthan, Saurashtra, Services and Vidarbha were placed in Group D, with all the matches taking place in Indore. Rajasthan won Group D to qualify for the knockout stage of the tournament.

== Points table ==
Team	Pld	W	L	T	NR	Pts	NRR
Rajasthan (Q)	5	4	1	0	0	16	+0.503
Madhya Pradesh	5	4	1	0	0	16	+0.285
Saurashtra	5	3	2	0	0	12	+1.560
Goa	5	3	2	0	0	12	–0.373
Services	5	1	4	0	0	4	–0.145
Vidarbha	5	0	5	0	0	0	–1.907

- Top team advanced to the Knockout Stage

== Fixtures ==
=== Round 1 ===
11 January 2021
Scorecard

Services; 163/4 (20 overs)	v	Saurashtra; 166/7 (19.1 overs)
Rahul Singh 76* (40); Chetan Sakariya 1/19 (4 overs)		Chirag Jani 34* (19); Varun Choudhary 3/39 (4 overs)

Saurashtra won by 3 wickets
Holkar Cricket Stadium, Indore
Umpires: Mukund Mandale and Rohan Pandit

- Saurashtra won the toss and elected to field.

11 January 2021
Scorecard

Vidarbha; 104 (19.3 overs)	v	Rajasthan; 106/7 (14.3 overs)
Siddhesh Wath 31 (45); Deepak Chahar 3/10 (3.3 overs)		Arjit Gupta 41* (23); Darshan Nalkande 4/20 (3 overs)

Rajasthan won by 3 wickets
Emerald High School Ground, Indore
Umpires: Sadashiv Iyer and Vinod Seshan

- Rajasthan won the toss and elected to field.
- Nachiket Bhute (Vidarbha) made his T20 debut.

11 January 2021
Scorecard

Madhya Pradesh; 214/3 (20 overs)	v	Goa; 208/7 (20 overs)
Rajat Patidar 96 (51); Ashoke Dinda 2/45 (4 overs)		Suyash Prabhudessai 48* (22); Ankit Sharma 2/32 (4 overs)

Madhya Pradesh won by 6 runs
Holkar Cricket Stadium, Indore
Umpires: Belur Ravi and Vineet Kulkarni

- Goa won the toss and elected to field.
- Arpit Gaud, Rakesh Thakur and Surendra Malviya (Madhya Pradesh) all made their T20 debuts.

=== Round 2 ===
13 January 2021
Scorecard

Saurashtra; 233/7 (20 overs)	v	Vidarbha; 154 (17.2 overs)
Avi Barot 93 (44); Darshan Nalkande 4/32 (4 overs)		Jitesh Sharma 43 (27); Chetan Sakariya 5/11 (4 overs)

Saurashtra won by 79 runs
Holkar Cricket Stadium, Indore
Umpires: Belur Ravi and Vineet Kulkarni

- Vidarbha won the toss and elected to field.

13 January 2021
Scorecard

Services; 160/7 (20 overs)	v	Goa; 163/5 (19.4 overs)
Ravi Chauhan 62 (53); Lakshay Garg 2/25 (4 overs)		Aditya Kaushik 78 (56); Mohit Kumar 3/32 (4 overs)

Goa won by 5 wickets
Emerald High School Ground, Indore
Umpires: Sadashiv Iyer and Vinod Seshan

- Goa won the toss and elected to field.

13 January 2021
Scorecard

Rajasthan; 148 (19.2 overs)	v	Madhya Pradesh; 138/8 (20 overs)
Mahipal Lomror 51 (27); Avesh Khan 4/22 (4 overs)		Parth Sahani 74 (45); Rahul Chahar 5/14 (4 overs)

Rajasthan won by 10 runs
Holkar Cricket Stadium, Indore
Umpires: Mukund Mandale and Rohan Pandit

- Madhya Pradesh won the toss and elected to field.

=== Round 3 ===
15 January 2021
Scorecard

Madhya Pradesh; 136/9 (20 overs)	v	Vidarbha; 115/9 (20 overs)
Rajat Patidar 50 (41); Yash Thakur 3/25 (4 overs)		Siddhesh Wath 26 (15); Avesh Khan 5/17 (4 overs)

Madhya Pradesh won by 21 runs
Holkar Cricket Stadium, Indore
Umpires: Mukund Mandale and Rohan Pandit

- Vidarbha won the toss and elected to field.
- Aditya Thakare and Mohit Raut (Vidarbha) both made their T20 debuts.

15 January 2021
Scorecard

Services; 133/9 (20 overs)	v	Rajasthan; 134/4 (17.3 overs)
Lakhan Singh 44 (32); Ravi Bishnoi 4/15 (4 overs)		Ankit Lamba 51 (40); Lakhan Singh 2/22 (3 overs)

Rajasthan won by 6 wickets
Emerald High School Ground, Indore
Umpires: Sadashiv Iyer and Vinod Seshan

- Services won the toss and elected to bat.

15 January 2021
Scorecard

Saurashtra; 215/5 (20 overs)	v	Goa; 125 (18.4 overs)
Avi Barot 122 (53); Ashoke Dinda 2/32 (4 overs)		Eknath Kerkar 32 (30); Chirag Jani 3/24 (3.4 overs)

Saurashtra won by 90 runs
Holkar Cricket Stadium, Indore
Umpires: Belur Ravi and Vineet Kulkarni

- Goa won the toss and elected to field.

=== Round 4 ===
17 January 2021
Scorecard

Goa; 154/7 (20 overs)	v	Rajasthan; 117 (19.3 overs)
Eknath Kerkar 38 (32); Ravi Bishnoi 3/26 (4 overs)		Ashok Menaria 24 (27); Vijesh Prabhudessai 3/28 (3.3 overs)

Goa won by 37 runs
Holkar Cricket Stadium, Indore
Umpires: Belur Ravi and Vineet Kulkarni

- Goa won the toss and elected to bat.

17 January 2021
Scorecard

Vidarbha; 150/7 (20 overs)	v	Services; 153/2 (17.2 overs)
Yash Rathod 36 (31); Varun Choudhary 3/31 (4 overs)		Lakhan Singh 66 (49); Akshay Wakhare 1/28 (4 overs)

Services won by 8 wickets
Holkar Cricket Stadium, Indore
Umpires: Mukund Mandale and Rohan Pandit

- Vidarbha won the toss and elected to bat.
- Yash Rathod (Vidarbha) made his T20 debut.

17 January 2021
Scorecard

Saurashtra; 180/4 (20 overs)	v	Madhya Pradesh; 181/4 (19 overs)
Samarth Vyas 66* (44); Parth Sahani 1/12 (1 over)		Venkatesh Iyer 88* (53); Chetan Sakariya 2/31 (4 overs)

Madhya Pradesh won by 6 wickets
Emerald High School Ground, Indore
Umpires: Sadashiv Iyer and Vinod Seshan

- Saurashtra won the toss and elected to bat.

=== Round 5 ===
19 January 2021
Scorecard

Madhya Pradesh; 169/6 (20 overs)	v	Services; 167/7 (20 overs)
Parth Sahani 51* (26); Nitin Tanwar 2/14 (4 overs)		Rahul Singh 53 (33); Avesh Khan 3/23 (4 overs)

Madhya Pradesh won by 2 runs
Holkar Cricket Stadium, Indore
Umpires: Mukund Mandale and Rohan Pandit

- Madhya Pradesh won the toss and elected to bat.

19 January 2021
Scorecard

Goa; 156/6 (20 overs)	v	Vidarbha; 140/8 (20 overs)
Amit Verma 72* (46); Yash Thakur 3/36 (4 overs)		Akshay Karnewar 31 (21); Felix Alemao 3/27 (4 overs)

Goa won by 16 runs
Emerald High School Ground, Indore
Umpires: Sadashiv Iyer and Vinod Seshan

- Goa won the toss and elected to bat.

19 January 2021
Scorecard

Rajasthan; 165/5 (20 overs)	v	Saurashtra; 150/5 (20 overs)
Ashok Menaria 67 (52); Chetan Sakariya 2/22 (4 overs)		Prerak Mankad 61* (37); Aniket Choudhary 2/29 (4 overs)

Rajasthan won by 15 runs
Holkar Cricket Stadium, Indore
Umpires: Belur Ravi and Vineet Kulkarni

- Rajasthan won the toss and elected to bat.
