= 2022–23 Syed Mushtaq Ali Trophy Group A =

Cricket tournament

- Dates: 11 October – 5 November 2022
- Administrator(s): BCCI
- Cricket format: Twenty20 cricket
- Tournament format(s): Round-robin
- Participants: 8

The 2022–23 Syed Mushtaq Ali Trophy was the fifteenth season of the Syed Mushtaq Ali Trophy, a Twenty20 cricket tournament played in India. It was contested by 38 teams, divided into five groups, with eight teams in Group A. The tournament was announced by BCCI on 8 August 2022.

== Points table ==
Pos	Team	Pld	W	L	NR	Pts	NRR
1	Mumbai	7	6	1	0	24	1.448
2	Vidarbha	7	5	2	0	20	0.829
3	Uttarakhand	7	4	3	0	16	1.272
4	Assam	7	4	3	0	16	−0.010
5	Railways	7	3	4	0	12	0.257
6	Rajasthan	7	3	4	0	12	0.179
7	Madhya Pradesh	7	3	4	0	12	0.113
8	Mizoram	7	0	7	0	0	−4.139

Updated to match(es) played on 22 October 2022. Source: ESPN Cricinfo

Advanced to Quarter-final
Advanced to Preliminary quarter-final

== Fixtures ==
=== Round 1 ===
11 October 2022
Scorecard

Mizoram; 98/8 (20 overs)	v	Mumbai; 103/1 (10.3 overs)
Shreevats Goswami 31 (29); Tanush Kotian 2/12 (4 overs)		Prithvi Shaw 55* (34); Remruatdika Ralte 1/14 (2 overs)

Mumbai won by 9 wickets
Saurashtra Cricket Association Stadium C, Saurashtra
Umpires: Mohit Krishnadas and Sundaram Ravi

- Mumbai won the toss and elected to field.
- F Lalmuanzuala and Vanlalhruailuanga (Mizoram) both made their T20 debuts.
- Impact Player Sub: Sairaj Patil for Dhawal Kulkarni (Mumbai).

11 October 2022
Scorecard

Railways; 150/5 (20 overs)	v	Uttarakhand; 154/3 (19.3 overs)
Vivek Singh 68 (49); Akash Madhwal 3/25 (4 overs)		Jiwanjot Singh 77 * (55); Harsh Tyagi 2/33 (4 overs)

Uttarakhand won by 7 wickets
Saurashtra Cricket Association Stadium, Rajkot
Umpires: Premdip Chatterjee and C. K. Nandan

- Uttarakhand won the toss and elected to field.
- Susheel Kumar (Railways) and Rajan Kumar (Uttarakhand) both made their T20 debuts.
- Impact Player Subs: Suraj Ahuja for Mohammad Saif (Railways) and Piyush Joshi for Avneesh Sudha (Uttarakhand).

11 October 2022
Scorecard

Assam; 161/5 (20 overs)	v	Vidarbha; 162/4 (18.5 overs)
Rahul Hazarika 68 (52); Darshan Nalkande 2/31 (4 overs)		Akshay Wadkar 49* (38); Mukhtar Hussain 1/14 (3 overs)

Vidarbha won by 6 wickets
Saurashtra Cricket Association Stadium C, Saurashtra
Umpires: Mohit Krishnadas and Sundaram Ravi

- Assam won the toss and elected to bat.
- Rahul Hazarika, Subham Mandal, Nihar Narah, Dharani Rabha (Assam) and Aman Mokhade (Vidarbha) all made their T20 debuts.
- Impact Player Subs: Nipan Deka for Rahul Hazarika (Assam) and Shubham Dubey for Aditya Sarwate (Vidarbha).

11 October 2022
Scorecard

Madhya Pradesh; 173/5 (20 overs)	v	Rajasthan; 135 (19.2 overs)
Venkatesh Iyer 62* (31); Manav Suthar 2/15 (3 overs)		Salman Khan 44 (34); Venkatesh Iyer 6/20 (4 overs)

Madhya Pradesh won by 38 runs
Saurashtra Cricket Association Stadium, Rajkot
Umpires: Premdip Chatterjee and C. K. Nandan

- Madhya Pradesh won the toss and elected to bat.
- Aman Bhadoriya, Akshat Raghuwanshi, Chanchal Rathore, Kamal Tripathi (Madhya Pradesh), Kunal Singh Rathore, Anirudh Singh and Manav Suthar (Rajasthan) all made their T20 debuts.
- Impact Player Subs: Aman Bhadoriya for Kuldeep Gehi (Madhya Pradesh) and Anirudh Singh for Tanveer Ul-Haq (Rajasthan).

=== Round 2 ===
12 October 2022
Scorecard

Uttarakhand; 144/9 (20 overs)	v	Assam; 145/3 (18.5 overs)
Swapnil Singh 52 (40); Mrinmoy Dutta 4/35 (4 overs)		Nihar Narah 45 (40); Rajan Kumar 1/22 (4 overs)

Assam won by 7 wickets.
Saurashtra Cricket Association Stadium C, Saurashtra
Umpires: Premdip Chatterjee and Sundaram Ravi

- Assam won the toss and elected to field.
- Impact Player Subs: Piyush Joshi for Jiwanjot Singh (Uttarakhand) and Nipan Deka for Dharani Rabha (Assam).

12 October 2022
Scorecard

Vidarbha; 136/9 (20 overs)	v	Rajasthan; 137/1 (15.3 overs)
Atharva Taide 43 (24); Aniket Choudhary 4/37 (4 overs)		Ashok Menaria 77 (49); Yash Thakur 1/23 (2 overs)

Rajasthan won by 9 wickets
Saurashtra Cricket Association Stadium, Rajkot
Umpires: Mohit Krishnadas and C. K. Nandan

- Rajasthan won the toss and elected to field.
- Impact Player Sub: Akshay Wakhare for Siddhesh Wath (Vidarbha).

12 October 2022
Scorecard

Mizoram; 96/5 (20 overs)	v	Railways; 99/3 (12.2 overs)
Taruwar Kohli 32 (41); Mohit Raut 2/11 (4 overs)		Mohammad Saif 32 (20); Rinsangzela Hmamte 2/17 (2.2 overs)

Railways won by 7 wickets
Saurashtra Cricket Association Stadium C, Saurashtra
Umpires: Premdip Chatterjee and Sundaram Ravi

- Mizoram won the toss and elected to bat.
- Lalhriatrenga (Mizoram) made his T20 debut.
- Impact Player Sub: Lalhriatrenga for Remruatdika Ralte (Mizoram).

12 October 2022
Scorecard

Madhya Pradesh; 181/7 (20 overs)	v	Mumbai; 182/2 (17 overs)
Rajat Patidar 67 (35); Tushar Deshpande 3/26 (4 overs)		Yashasvi Jaiswal 66* (44); Shubham Sharma 1/18 (3 overs)

Mumbai won by 8 wickets
Saurashtra Cricket Association Stadium, Rajkot
Umpires: Mohit Krishnadas and C. K. Nandan

- Madhya Pradesh won the toss and elected to bat.
- Aditya Shrivastava made his T20 debut.
- Impact Player Sub: Aditya Shrivastava for Akshat Raghuwanshi (Madhya Pradesh).

=== Round 3 ===
14 October 2022
Scorecard

Uttarakhand; 194/2 (20 overs)	v	Madhya Pradesh; 144/9 (20 overs)
Kunal Chandela 59* (24); Parth Sahani 1/27 (4 overs)		Venkatesh Iyer 42 (29); Rajan Kumar 3/17 (4 overs)

Uttarakhand won by 50 runs
Saurashtra Cricket Association Stadium C, Saurashtra
Umpires: Premdip Chatterjee and C. K. Nandan

- Madhya Pradesh won the toss and elected to field.
- Satyam Baliyan, Neeraj Rathour (Uttarakhand) and Siddharth Patidar (Madhya Pradesh) all made their T20 debuts.
- Impact Player Subs: Satyam Baliyan for Piyush Joshi (Uttarakhand) and Siddharth Patidar for Kuldeep Sen (Madhya Pradesh).

14 October 2022
Scorecard

Mumbai; 230/3 (20 overs)	v	Assam; 169 (19.3 overs)
Prithvi Shaw 134 (61); Riyan Parag 1/25 (4 overs)		Rajjakuddin Ahmed 39 (26); Tushar Deshpande 3/25 (3.3 overs)

Mumbai won by 61 runs
Saurashtra Cricket Association Stadium, Rajkot
Umpires: Mohit Krishnadas and Sundaram Ravi

- Assam won the toss and elected to field.
- Impact Player Subs: Abhishek Thakuri for Denish Das (Assam) and Prashant Solanki for Dhawal Kulkarni (Mumbai).

14 October 2022
Scorecard

Vidarbha; 192/6 (20 overs)	v	Mizoram; 78/6 (20 overs)
Shubham Dubey 49* (31); Bobby Zothansanga 2/30 (4 overs)		Shreevats Goswami 48* (56); Akshay Karnewar 2/19 (4 overs)

Vidarbha won by 114 runs
Saurashtra Cricket Association Stadium C, Saurashtra
Umpires: Premdip Chatterjee and C. K. Nandan

- Vidarbha won the toss and elected to bat.
- Impact Player Subs: Harsh Dubey for Aman Mokhade (Vidarbha) and Lalhriatrenga for Rinsangzela Hmamte (Mizoram).

14 October 2022
Scorecard

Rajasthan; 167/6 (20 overs)	v	Railways; 159/8 (20 overs)
Mahipal Lomror 50 (44); Yuvraj Singh 2/25 (4 overs)		Shivam Chaudhary 70 (55); Aniket Choudhary 3/25 (4 overs)

Rajasthan won by 8 runs
Saurashtra Cricket Association Stadium, Rajkot
Umpires: Mohit Krishnadas and Sundaram Ravi

- Rajasthan won the toss and elected to bat.
- Samarpit Joshi (Rajasthan) made his T20 debut.
- Impact Player Subs: Samarpit Joshi for Salman Khan (Rajasthan) and Suraj Ahuja for Mohammad Saif (Railways).

=== Round 4 ===
16 October 2022
Scorecard

Mumbai; 155/8 (20 overs)	v	Vidarbha; 140/6 (20 overs)
Shivam Dube 41 (40); Aditya Sarwate 3/28 (4 overs)		Atharva Taide 28 (23); Shams Mulani 3/21 (4 overs)

Mumbai won by 15 runs
Saurashtra Cricket Association Stadium C, Saurashtra
Umpires: Premdip Chatterjee and C. K. Nandan

- Vidarbha won the toss and elected to field.
- Impact Player Subs: Mohit Avasthi for Yashasvi Jaiswal (Mumbai) and Siddhesh Wath for Yash Thakur (Vidarbha).

16 October 2022
Scorecard

Rajasthan; 143/6 (20 overs)	v	Uttarakhand; 147/6 (20 overs)
Salman Khan 47* (40); Swapnil Singh 2/23 (4 overs)		Aditya Tare 34 (28); Ravi Bishnoi 3/24 (4 overs)

Uttarakhand won by 4 wickets
Saurashtra Cricket Association Stadium, Rajkot
Umpires: Mohit Krishnadas and Sundaram Ravi

- Uttarakhand won the toss and elected to field.
- Impact Player Subs: Manav Suthar for Salman Khan (Rajasthan) and Neeraj Rathour for Piyush Joshi (Uttarakhand).

16 October 2022
Scorecard

Madhya Pradesh; 190/5 (20 overs)	v	Railways; 176/9 (20 overs)
Rajat Patidar 92* (43); Susheel Kumar 2/35 (4 overs)		Pratham Singh 55 (39); Ashwin Das 3/35 (4 overs)

Madhya Pradesh won by 14 runs
Saurashtra Cricket Association Stadium C, Saurashtra
Umpires: Premdip Chatterjee and C. K. Nandan

- Madhya Pradesh won the toss and elected to bat.
- Impact Player Subs: Kumar Kartikeya for Rajat Patidar (Madhya Pradesh) and Navneet Virk for Shivam Chaudhary (Railways).

16 October 2022
Scorecard

Mizoram; 115/9 (20 overs)	v	Assam; 118/3 (16.3 overs)
Taruwar Kohli 75 (52); Mrinmoy Dutta 2/10 (4 overs)		Riyan Parag 52* (30); Rinsangzela Hmamte 1/3 (1 over)

Assam won by 7 wickets
Saurashtra Cricket Association Stadium, Rajkot
Umpires: Mohit Krishnadas and Sundaram Ravi

- Assam won the toss and elected to field.
- Impact Player Sub: Subham Mandal for Rahul Hazarika (Assam).

=== Round 5 ===
18 October 2022
Scorecard

Assam; 134/5 (20 overs)	v	Railways; 135/2 (18.5 overs)
Riyan Parag 49* (37); Yuvraj Singh 2/18 (4 overs)		Shivam Chaudhary 62 (53); Riyan Parag 1/12 (4 overs)

Railways won by 8 wickets
Saurashtra Cricket Association Stadium C, Saurashtra
Umpires: Premdip Chatterjee and Sundaram Ravi

- Railways won the toss and elected to field.
- Avinov Choudhury (Assam) made his T20 debut.
- Impact Player Subs: Abhishek Thakuri for Rahul Hazarika (Assam) and Akshat Pandey for T Pradeep (Railways).

18 October 2022
Scorecard

Mizoram; 94/6 (20 overs)	v	Madhya Pradesh; 98/4 (12.1 overs)
Taruwar Kohli 26 (31); Kamal Tripathi 4/11 (4 overs)		Shubham Sharma 31 (23); Lalhruai Ralte 2/35 (4 overs)

Madhya Pradesh won by 6 wickets
Saurashtra Cricket Association Stadium, Rajkot
Umpires: Mohit Krishnadas and C. K. Nandan

- Mizoram won the toss and elected to bat.
- Impact Player Subs: Joseph Lalthankhuma for Lalhmangaiha (Mizoram) and Siddharth Patidar for Gaurav Yadav (Madhya Pradesh).

18 October 2022
Scorecard

Mumbai; 159/6 (20 overs)	v	Rajasthan; 139/7 (20 overs)
Yashasvi Jaiswal 46 (27); Rahul Chahar 2/18 (4 overs)		Mahipal Lomror 46 (33); Tushar Deshpande 2/12 (4 overs)

Mumbai won by 20 runs
Saurashtra Cricket Association Stadium C, Saurashtra
Umpires: Premdip Chatterjee and Sundaram Ravi

- Mumbai won the toss and elected to bat.
- Impact Player Subs: Anirudh Singh for Khaleel Ahmed (Rajasthan) and Mohit Avasthi for Yashasvi Jaiswal (Mumbai).

18 October 2022
Scorecard

Vidarbha; 157/6 (20 overs)	v	Uttarakhand; 155/8 (20 overs)
Atharva Taide 36 (27); Mayank Mishra 2/27 (4 overs)		Aditya Tare 46 (25); Yash Thakur 4/22 (4 overs)

Vidarbha won by 2 runs
Saurashtra Cricket Association Stadium, Rajkot
Umpires: Mohit Krishnadas and C. K. Nandan

- Uttarakhand won the toss and elected to field.
- Impact Player Subs: Harsh Dubey for Shubham Dubey (Vidarbha) and Piyush Joshi for Jiwanjot Singh (Uttarakhand).

=== Round 6 ===
20 October 2022
Scorecard

Vidarbha; 180/5 (20 overs)	v	Madhya Pradesh; 158 (19.1 overs)
Jitesh Sharma 50* (21); Ankit Kushwah 3/28 (4 overs)		Ashwin Das 36 (23); Darshan Nalkande 3/23 (4 overs)

Vidarbha won by 22 runs
Saurashtra Cricket Association Stadium C, Saurashtra
Umpires: Premdip Chatterjee and C. K. Nandan

- Vidarbha won the toss and elected to bat.
- Impact Player Subs: Aman Bhadoriya for Kuldeep Sen (Madhya Pradesh) and Harsh Dubey for Shubham Dubey (Vidarbha).

20 October 2022
Scorecard

Mumbai; 107 (20 overs)	v	Railways; 111/6 (19.1 overs)
Shivam Dube 29* (30); Yuvraj Singh 4/20 (4 overs)		Shivam Chaudhary 40 (38); Tanush Kotian 2/12 (3.1 overs)

Railways won by 4 wickets
Saurashtra Cricket Association Stadium, Rajkot
Umpires: Mohit Krishnadas and Sundaram Ravi

- Railways won the toss and elected to field.
- Impact Player Subs: Aman Hakim Khan for Yashasvi Jaiswal (Mumbai) and Mohammad Saif for Pratham Singh (Railways).

20 October 2022
Scorecard

Rajasthan; 109/8 (20 overs)	v	Assam; 112/7 (16.3 overs)
Kunal Singh Rathore 35* (39); Avinov Choudhury 4/15 (4 overs)		Subham Mandal 29 (23); Tanveer Ul-Haq 2/11 (2 overs)

Assam won by 3 wickets
Saurashtra Cricket Association Stadium C, Saurashtra
Umpires: Premdip Chatterjee and C. K. Nandan

- Rajasthan won the toss and elected to bat.
- Virendra Gurjar (Rajasthan) made his T20 debut.
- Impact Player Subs: Denish Das for Rahul Hazarika (Assam) and Samarpit Joshi for Ramnivas Golada (Rajasthan).

20 October 2022
Scorecard

Uttarakhand; 179/5 (20 overs)	v	Mizoram; 50 (16 overs)
Piyush Joshi 64 (43); Taruwar Kohli 3/19 (4 overs)		Joseph Lalthankhuma 14 (22); Himanshu Bisht 4/8 (3 overs)

Uttarakhand won by 129 runs
Saurashtra Cricket Association Stadium, Rajkot
Umpires: Mohit Krishnadas and Sundaram Ravi

- Mizoram won the toss and elected to field.
- Impact Player Subs: Himanshu Bisht for Piyush Joshi (Uttarakhand) and Joseph Lalthankhuma for Lalhmangaiha (Mizoram).

=== Round 7 ===
22 October 2022
Scorecard

Rajasthan; 183/3 (20 overs)	v	Mizoram; 110/7 (20 overs)
Abhijeet Tomar 84* (59); Remruatdika Ralte 2/36 (4 overs)		Taruwar Kohli 63 (56); Tanveer Ul-Haq 2/18 (3 overs)

Rajasthan won by 73 runs
Saurashtra Cricket Association Stadium C, Saurashtra
Umpires: Premdip Chatterjee and Sundaram Ravi

- Rajasthan won the toss and elected to bat.
- Arafat Khan and Shubham Garhwal (Rajasthan) both made their T20 debuts.
- Impact Player Subs: Arafat Khan for Samarpit Joshi (Rajasthan) and Joseph Lalthankhuma for Rinsangzela Hmamte (Mizoram).

22 October 2022
Scorecard

Madhya Pradesh; 192/4 (20 overs)	v	Assam; 194/5 (19.1 overs)
Ashwin Das 68* (30); Mukhtar Hussain 2/42 (4 overs)		Riyan Parag 75 (41); Ashwin Das 2/26 (2.1 overs)

Assam won by 5 wickets
Saurashtra Cricket Association Stadium, Rajkot
Umpires: Mohit Krishnadas and C. K. Nandan

- Madhya Pradesh won the toss and elected to bat.
- Impact Player Subs: Ashwin Das for Chanchal Rathore (Madhaya Pradesh) and Nipan Deka for Rahul Hazarika (Assam).

22 October 2022
Scorecard

Mumbai; 174/5 (20 overs)	v	Uttarakhand; 172/9 (20 overs)
Yashasvi Jaiswal 45 (27); Himanshu Bisht 3/37 (4 overs)		Avneesh Sudha 96 (66); Shams Mulani 2/26 (4 overs)

Mumbai won by 2 runs
Saurashtra Cricket Association Stadium C, Saurashtra
Umpires: Premdip Chatterjee and Sundaram Ravi

- Uttarakhand won the toss and elected to field.
- Impact Player Subs: Piyush Joshi for Jiwanjot Singh (Uttarakhand) and Prashant Solanki for Yashasvi Jaiswal (Mumbai).

22 October 2022
Scorecard

Railways; 150/5 (20 overs)	v	Vidarbha; 153/4 (18.2 overs)
Shivam Chaudhary 84* (58); Aditya Sarwate 2/8 (2 overs)		Apoorv Wankhade 71* (42); Yuvraj Singh 2/27 (4 overs)

Vidarbha won by 6 wickets
Saurashtra Cricket Association Stadium, Rajkot
Umpires: Mohit Krishnadas and C. K. Nandan

- Vidarbha won the toss and elected to field.
- Impact Player Subs: Aditya Sarwate for Akshay Wakhare (Vidarbha) and Harsh Tyagi for Shivam Chaudhary (Railways).
