= 2021–22 Syed Mushtaq Ali Trophy Group C =

Cricket tournament

- Dates: 4 – 22 November 2021
- Administrator: BCCI
- Cricket format: Twenty20 cricket
- Tournament format: Round-robin
- Participants: 6

The 2021–22 Syed Mushtaq Ali Trophy was the fourteenth season of the Syed Mushtaq Ali Trophy, a Twenty20 cricket tournament played in India. It was contested by 38 teams, divided into six groups, with six teams in Group C. The tournament was announced by BCCI on 3 July 2021.

Rajasthan won all five of their matches, with Himachal Pradesh winning four matches. Therefore, Rajasthan advanced to the quarter-finals and Himachal Pradesh progressed to the preliminary quarter-finals.

== Points table ==
Pos	Team	Pld	W	L	NR	Pts	NRR
1	Rajasthan	5	5	0	0	20	1.242
2	Himachal Pradesh	5	3	2	0	12	−0.260
3	Jharkhand	5	2	3	0	8	−0.137
4	Andhra Pradesh	5	2	3	0	8	−0.156
5	Haryana	5	2	3	0	8	−0.315
6	Jammu and Kashmir	5	1	4	0	4	−0.360

Source: ESPN Cricinfo

Advanced to Quarter-final
Advanced to Preliminary quarter-final

== Fixtures ==
=== Round 1 ===
4 November 2021
Scorecard

Himachal Pradesh; 145/9 (20 overs)	v	Haryana; 149/2 (17.4 overs)
Nikhil Gangta 52 (43); Harshal Patel 3/27 (4 overs)		Himanshu Rana 87* (58); Pankaj Jaswal 1/23 (3 overs)

Haryana won by 8 wickets
Reliance Stadium, Vadodara
Umpires: Ulhas Gandhe and Belur Ravi

- Haryana won the toss and elected to field.
- Jaideep Bhambhu (Haryana) made his T20 debut.

4 November 2021
Scorecard

Jharkhand; 146/5 (20 overs)	v	Rajasthan; 147/4 (17.3 overs)
Kumar Deobrat 51 (34); Tanveer Ul-Haq 2/18 (4 overs)		Deepak Hooda 75* (39); Monu Kumar 1/21 (3.3 overs)

Rajasthan won by 6 wickets
F. B. Colony Ground, Vadodara
Umpires: K. N. Ananthapadmanabhan and Pranav Joshi

- Rajasthan won the toss and elected to field.
- Kumar Kushagra (Jharkhand), Suraj Ahuja and Yash Kothari (Rajasthan) all made their T20 debuts.

4 November 2021
Scorecard

Andhra Pradesh; 198/1 (20 overs)	v	Jammu & Kashmir; 162/8 (20 overs)
Ashwin Hebbar 73* (49); Mujtaba Yousuf 1/33 (4 overs)		Qamran Iqbal 47 (42); CV Stephen 3/33 (4 overs)

Andhra Pradesh won by 36 runs
F. B. Colony Ground, Vadodara
Umpires: K. N. Ananthapadmanabhan and Pranav Joshi

- Andhra Pradesh won the toss and elected to bat.
- Nitish Kumar Reddy, Lekhaz Reddy, Uddaraj Varma (Andhra Pradesh) and Vivrant Sharma (Jammu & Kashmir) all made their T20 debuts.

=== Round 2 ===
5 November 2021
Scorecard

Jammu & Kashmir; 144/4 (20 overs)	v	Rajasthan; 148/5 (18.5 overs)
Ian Dev Singh 45 (33); Ravi Bishnoi 2/25 (4 overs)		Deepak Hooda 50 (28); Mujtaba Yousuf 2/26 (4 overs)

Rajasthan won by 5 wickets
Reliance Stadium, Vadodara
Umpires: Ulhas Gandhe and Belur Ravi

- Rajasthan won the toss and elected to field.

5 November 2021
Scorecard

Himachal Pradesh; 144/8 (20 overs)	v	Jharkhand; 137/9 (20 overs)
Nikhil Gangta 32 (27); Monu Kumar 3/31 (4 overs)		Anukul Roy 39 (19); Ankush Bedi 2/17 (4 overs)

Himachal Pradesh won by 7 runs
Reliance Stadium, Vadodara
Umpires: Ulhas Gandhe and Belur Ravi

- Himachal Pradesh won the toss and elected to bat.
- Ankush Bedi (Himachal Pradesh) made his T20 debut.

5 November 2021
Scorecard

Andhra Pradesh; 179/4 (20 overs)	v	Haryana; 180/4 (17.5 overs)
Ashwin Hebbar 103* (53); Harshal Patel 2/45 (4 overs)		Himanshu Rana 52 (30); Uddaraju Varma 2/40 (4 overs)

Haryana won by 6 wickets
F. B. Colony Ground, Vadodara
Umpires: Vineet Kulkarni and Saidharshan Kumar

- Haryana won the toss and elected to field.

=== Round 3 ===
6 November 2021
Scorecard

Haryana; 108 (19 overs)	v	Jammu & Kashmir; 109/3 (17 overs)
Rohit Sharma 29 (29); Umran Malik 4/22 (4 overs)		Parvez Rasool 34* (31); Jayant Yadav 2/23 (4 overs)

Jammu & Kashmir won by 7 wickets
F. B. Colony Ground, Vadodara
Umpires: Vineet Kulkarni and Saidharshan Kumar

- Jammu & Kashmir won the toss and elected to field.
- Henan Nazir (Jammu & Kashmir) made his T20 debut.

6 November 2021
Scorecard

Andhra Pradesh; 165/4 (20 overs)	v	Jharkhand; 157/9 (20 overs)
K. S. Bharat 48 (47); Shahbaz Nadeem 1/22 (4 overs)		Ishank Jaggi 62 (39); CV Stephen 3/23 (4 overs)

Andhra Pradesh won by 8 runs
F. B. Colony Ground, Vadodara
Umpires: Vineet Kulkarni and Saidharshan Kumar

- Jharkhand won the toss and elected to field.
- Shubham Kumar Singh (Jharkhand) and Pinninti Tapaswi (Andhra Pradesh) both made their T20 debuts.

6 November 2021
Scorecard

Himachal Pradesh; 136/6 (20 overs)	v	Rajasthan; 141/3 (14.4 overs)
Prashant Chopra 53 (48); Tanveer Ul-Haq 2/13 (4 overs)		Deepak Hooda 70* (36); Rishi Dhawan 2/21 (3 overs)

Rajasthan won by 7 wickets
Reliance Stadium, Vadodara
Umpires: K. N. Ananthapadmanabhan and Pranav Joshi

- Rajasthan won the toss and elected to field.

=== Round 4 ===
8 November 2021
Scorecard

Jharkhand; 181/5 (20 overs)	v	Haryana; 165 (20 overs)
Saurabh Tiwary 58* (35); Rahul Tewatia 2/14 (2 overs)		Harshal Patel 26 (14); Bal Krishna 3/34 (4 overs)

Jharkhand won by 16 runs
Reliance Stadium, Vadodara
Umpires: K. N. Ananthapadmanabhan and Pranav Joshi

- Haryana won the toss and elected to field.
- Dhruv Parashar (Haryana) made his T20 debut.

8 November 2021
Scorecard

Himachal Pradesh; 157/8 (20 overs)	v	Jammu & Kashmir; 153 (19.5 overs)
Raghav Dhawan 47 (46); Auqib Nabi 3/35 (4 overs)		Abdul Samad 55 (32); Rishi Dhawan 6/23 (3.5 overs)

Himachal Pradesh won by 4 runs
Reliance Stadium, Vadodara
Umpires: K. N. Ananthapadmanabhan and Pranav Joshi

- Himachal Pradesh won the toss and elected to bat.
- Amit Thakur and Naveen Kanwar (Himachal Pradesh) both made their T20 debuts.

8 November 2021
Scorecard

Rajasthan; 149 (20 overs)	v	Andhra Pradesh; 138/8 (20 overs)
Mahipal Lomror 69 (47); CV Stephen 3/23 (4 overs)		K. V. Sasikanth 47* (24); Shubham Sharma 3/16 (4 overs)

Rajasthan won by 11 runs
F. B. Colony Ground, Vadodara
Umpires: Ulhas Gandhe and Belur Ravi

- Rajasthan won the toss and elected to bat.
- Yash Kothari (Rajasthan) made his T20 debut.

=== Round 5 ===
9 November 2021
Scorecard

Himachal Pradesh; 148/7 (20 overs)	v	Andhra Pradesh; 118 (20 overs)
Raghav Dhawan 57 (46); CV Stephen 4/11 (4 overs)		Ashwin Hebbar 43 (49); Pankaj Jaiswal 5/18 (4 overs)

Himachal Pradesh won by 30 runs
F. B. Colony Ground, Vadodara
Umpires: Vineet Kulkarni and Saidharshan Kumar

- Andhra Pradesh won the toss and elected to field.

9 November 2021
Scorecard

Rajasthan; 155/6 (20 overs)	v	Haryana; 125 (19.1 overs)
Deepak Hooda 75 (47); Sumit Kumar 2/28 (4 overs)		Chaitanya Bishnoi 41 (45); Mohit Jain 4/14 (4 overs)

Rajasthan won by 30 runs
F. B. Colony Ground, Vadodara
Umpires: Vineet Kulkarni and Saidharshan Kumar

- Haryana won the toss and elected to field.

9 November 2021
Scorecard

Jammu & Kashmir; 156/6 (20 overs)	v	Jharkhand; 157/5 (19.2 overs)
Jatin Wadhwan 45 (41); Utkarsh Singh 2/22 (4 overs)		Virat Singh 40 (29); Ram Dayal 2/28 (4 overs)

Jharkhand won by 5 wickets
Reliance Stadium, Vadodara
Umpires: Ulhas Gandhe and Belur Ravi

- Jammu & Kashmir won the toss and elected to bat.
- Irfan-ul-Haq (Jammu & Kashmir) made his T20 debut.
