= Pratik =

Pratik or Prateik is an Indian masculine given name that may refer to

- Pratik Chaudhari (born 1989), Indian football player
- Pratik Desai (born 1989), Indian cricketer
- Pratik Gandhi, Indian theatre and film actor
- Prateik Jain (born 1989), Indian model and actor
- Prateik Smita Patil (born Prateik Babbar; 1986), Indian actor
- Pratik Prakashbapu Patil (born 1973), Indian politician
- Pratik A. Shah, American lawyer
- Pratik Salunke (born 1991), Indian cricketer
- Pratik Sargade (born 1989), Indian cricketer
- Pratik Agnihotri (born 1994), Norwegian cricketer
- Pratik Das (born 1994), Indian cricketer
