= Vipul =

Vipul is a male first name of Indian origin. Notable people with the name include:

- Vipul Aggarwal (born 1976), Indian Police Service officer
- Vipul Dubey (born 1982), politician
- Vipul Goel (born 1972), politician
- Vipul Goyal, stand-up comedian and actor
- Vipul Gupta, actor
- Vipul Krishna (born 2001), cricketer
- Vipul Mehta (disambiguation), several people
- Vipul Mudgal (born 1960), journalist, academic and social activist
- Vipul Pancholi (born 1968), judge of the Supreme Court of India
- Vipul Patel, American medical journalist
- Vipul Ved Prakash, software engineer and Internet entrepreneur
- Vipul K. Rawal, scriptwriter, filmmaker, and author
- Vipul Roy, actor
- Vipul Shah (born 1967), film writer, director, and producer
- Vipul D. Shah, television producer and writer
- Vipul Shinghal, Indian Army officer
