= Vijay Sharma =

Vijay Sharma may refer to:

- Vijay Sharma (painter)
- Vijay Sharma (politician)
- Vijay Sharma (cricketer)
