= 2024–25 Ranji Trophy Group B =

- Dates: 11 October 2024 – 2 February 2025
- Administrator: BCCI
- Cricket format: First-class cricket
- Tournament format: Round-robin then knockout
- Host: India
- Participants: 8
- Matches: 28

The 2024–25 Ranji Trophy is the 90th season of the Ranji Trophy, the premier first-class cricket tournament in India. It is contested by 38 teams, divided into four elite groups and a plate group, with eight teams in Group B. It took place between 11 October 2024 to 2 February 2025.

== Points table ==
Pos	Team	Pld	W	L	T	D	NR	Pts	Quot
1	Vidarbha	7	6	0	0	1	0	40	1.490
2	Gujarat	7	4	0	0	3	0	32	1.147
3	Himachal Pradesh	7	3	4	0	0	0	21	1.015
4	Hyderabad	7	2	3	0	2	0	16	1.223
5	Rajasthan	7	1	2	0	4	0	16	1.000
6	Andhra	7	1	3	0	3	0	13	0.946
7	Uttarakhand	7	1	3	0	3	0	11	0.617
8	Puducherry	7	0	3	0	4	0	8	0.783

Source: ESPNcricinfo

Advances to Quarter-final Relegated to Plate Group for next season

== Fixtures ==
=== Round 6 ===
23–26 January 2025
Scorecard

Uttarakhand; 111 (30 overs) & 254 (87.3 overs)	v	Gujarat; 393 (115.5 overs)

Gujarat won by an innings and 28 runs
Gujarat College Ground, Ahmedabad
Points: Gujarat 7, Uttarakhand 0

23–26 January 2025
Scorecard

Hyderabad; 565 (168.5 overs)	v	Himachal Pradesh; 275 (92 overs) & 247 (45.4 overs) (f/o)

Hyderabad won by an innings and 43 runs
Rajiv Gandhi International Cricket Stadium, Hyderabad
Points: Hyderabad 7, Himachal Pradesh 0

23–26 January 2025
Scorecard

Andhra; 303 (111.5 overs) & 319/6d (82.4 overs)	v	Puducherry; 260 (79 overs) & 152/0 (46 overs)

Match drawn
Cricket Association Puducherry Siechem Ground
Points: Andhra 3, Puducherry 1

23–26 January 2025
Scorecard

Vidarbha; 165 (57.3 overs) & 428/9d (138.1 overs)	v	Rajasthan; 265 (87.4 overs) & 107 (43.3 overs)

Vidarbha won by 221 runs
KL Saini Ground, Jaipur
Points: Vidarbha 6, Rajasthan 0

=== Round 7 ===
30 January–2 February 2025
Scorecard

Himachal Pradesh; 215 (66.3 overs) & 175 (62.5 overs)	v	Gujarat; 247 (90.2 overs) & 145/1 (22.3 overs)

Gujarat won by 9 wickets
Narendra Modi Stadium, Ahmedabad
Points: Gujarat 6, Himachal Pradesh 0

30 January–2 February 2025
Scorecard

Vidarbha; 190 (55.5 overs) & 355 (95.2 overs)	v	Hyderabad; 326 (91.4 overs) & 23/1 (6 overs)

Stumps, Day 3
Vidarbha Cricket Association Ground, Nagpur

30 January–2 February 2025
Scorecard

Puducherry; 427 (151.5 overs) & 41/2 (16.5 overs)	v	Uttarakhand; 273 (98.3 overs)

Stumps, Day 3
Cricket Association Puducherry Siechem Ground

30 January–2 February 2025
Scorecard

Rajasthan; 258 (79.5 overs) & 114 (39.4 overs)	v	Andhra; 220 (57.1 overs) & 157/4 (31 overs)

Andhra won by 6 wickets
Dr PVG Raju ACA Sports Complex, Vizianagram
Points: Andhra 6, Rajasthan 0
