= Irfan Khan =

Irfan Khan may refer to:

- Irrfan Khan (1967–2020), Indian actor who also acted in British and American films
- Irfan Khan (Indian cricketer) (born 1988), Indian cricketer
- Irfan Khan Niazi (born 2002), Pakistani cricketer
- Irfan Khan (singer) (born 1982), Pakistani Pushto singer
- Irfan Khan Pathan (born 1984), Indian former cricketer
- Irfan Khan, a suspect in the 2005 Ram Janmabhoomi attack
- Irfan Saadat Khan (born 1963), Pakistani jurist
