= Vashisth =

Vashisth may refer to:

== People ==
- Vivek Vashisth (born 1998), Indian cricketer

== Other uses ==
- Vashistha Dharmasutra, ancient Sanskrit Dharmasutra
