= Vishnu Tiwari (cricketer) =

Indian cricketer (born 1987)

Personal information
- Born: 11 November 1987 (age 39); Allahabad, India
- Source: Cricinfo, 18 October 2015

Vishnu Tiwari (born 11 November 1987) is an Indian first-class cricketer who plays for Services.
