= Mohit Ahlawat =

Mohit Ahlawat may refer to:

- Mohit Ahlawat (actor) (born 1982)
- Mohit Ahlawat (cricketer) (born 1995), Indian cricketer
