= Sarthala =

- Village
- Location in Rajasthan, India Sarthala (India)
- Coordinates: 24.42°N 74.47°E
- Country: India
- State: Rajasthan
- District: Chittaurgarh
- Elevation: 489 m (1,604 ft)

Population (2001)
  - Total: 1,374

Languages
  - Official: Hindi
- Time zone: UTC+5:30 (IST)
- Postal code: 312403
- ISO 3166 code: RJ-IN

Sarthala is a village located in Bari Sadri of Chittaurgarh district, Rajasthan.

== Geography ==
Sarthala is located close to Bari Sadri, which is located at 24.42°N 74.47°E. It has an average elevation of 279 m (915 ft).

== Demographics ==
According to the 2011 India census, Sarthala had a population of 1374, of which 704 are males and 670 are females. Sarthala is known for having a high population of the Menariya caste, as well as Rajput Gayari, Meghwal and Salvi communities also living in the village.

== Economy ==
The main business of the villagers is agriculture.

Sita Mata Wildlife Sanctuary is also nearby.
