= 2026–27 Syed Mushtaq Ali Trophy =

Indian cricket tournament

2026-27 Syed Mushtaq Ali Trophy
- Dates: 14 November – 6 December 2026
- Administrator: BCCI
- Cricket format: T20
- Tournament format(s): Round robin, Super league then knockout
- Participants: 38
- Matches: 141
- Official website: Syed Mushtaq Ali Trophy

The 2025–26 Syed Mushtaq Ali Trophy was the 19th edition of the Syed Mushtaq Ali Trophy, an annual Twenty20 tournament in India. The tournament took place from 14 November to 6 December 2026 and featured all 38 teams from the Ranji Trophy. The teams were divided into four elite groups, consisting of eight teams each, and one plate group comprising six teams. The tournament was a part of the 2026–27 Indian domestic cricket season, as announced by the Board of Control for Cricket in India (BCCI) in 2026. Jharkhand were the defending champions.

== Teams ==
Group A	Group B	Group C	Group D	Plate Group
Mumbai	Madhya Pradesh	Baroda	Delhi	Manipur
Vidarbha	Uttar Pradesh	Bengal	Saurashtra	Mizoram
Andhra	Chandigarh	Gujarat	Rajasthan	Meghalaya
Kerala	Jammu & Kashmir	Punjab	Jharkhand	Nagaland
Railways	Hyderabad	Haryana	Karnataka	Sikkim
Assam	Maharashtra	Himachal Pradesh	Tamil Nadu	Arunchal Pradesh
Chhattisgarh	Goa	Services	Uttarakhand	-
Odisha	Bihar	Pondicherry	Tripura	-
