= Rohit Dangwal =

Indian cricketer (born 1996)

Personal information
- Born: 31 March 1996 (age 30); Almora, Uttarakhand, India
- Source: Cricinfo, 21 February 2019

Rohit Dangwal (born 31 March 1996) is an Indian cricketer. He made his Twenty20 debut for Uttarakhand in the 2018–19 Syed Mushtaq Ali Trophy on 21 February 2019.
