= Cricket Association of Uttarakhand =

Cricket organization in Uttarakhand, India

- Sport: Cricket
- Jurisdiction: Uttarakhand, India
- Abbreviation: CAU
- Founded: 2006
- Affiliation: Board of Control for Cricket in India
- Affiliation date: 2019
- Headquarters: CAU Headquarters, Raipur
- Location: Dehradun, Uttarakhand, India
- President: Deepak Mehra
- Vice president: Dhiraj Bhandari
- Secretary: Mahim Verma
- Coach: Manish Jha

Official website
- cauttarakhand.tv
- (India)

The Cricket Association of Uttarakhand (CAU) is the governing body of the cricket activities in the Indian state of Uttarakhand and the Uttarakhand cricket team. It is affiliated with the Board of Control for Cricket in India.

Hira Singh Bisht was the founding president of the Cricket Association of Uttarakhand.

Currently Deepak Mehra is the President. Ajay Pandey is Vice-President and Kiran Verma is Secretary.

== History ==
Old logo of the Cricket Association of Uttarakhand

After Uttarakhand came into existence in year 2000, even by 2008 the state did not have a cricket team due to multiple cricket associations from the state applied for BCCI affiliation. In 2015, 3 of the 5 associations united under Uttarakhand Cricket Association to try to get BCCI affiliation. In 2017, United Cricket Association left the union and merged with Cricket Association of Uttarakhand (CAU). In 2018, when the cricket team started playing, BCCI had to constitute a Uttarakhand Cricket Consensus Committee to run the affairs of cricket in the state. In 2019, BCCI granted Cricket Association of Uttarakhand (CAU) its full membership. Uttarakhand Cricket Association failed to make through adequate criteria of BCCI, while Uttaranchal Cricket Association was rejected due to its lower revenue in comparison to CAU.

In June 2020, Wasim Jaffer was announced as the head coach of Uttarakhand cricket team for 2020–21 season.

== State teams ==
=== Men ===
- Uttarakhand cricket team
- Uttarakhand under-19 cricket team
- Uttarakhand under-15 cricket team

=== Women ===
- Uttarakhand women's cricket team
- Uttarakhand women's under-19 cricket team
- Uttarakhand women's under-15 cricket team

== Governing body ==
Elections for the Cricket Association of Uttarakhand were held on 2025. The elections were held unopposed and the following office bearers were elected:

- President: Deepak Mehra
- Vice President: Ajay Pandey
- General Secretary: Kiran Rautela Verma
- Joint Secretary: Noor Alam
- Treasurer: Manas Mingwal
- Member (Apex Council): Manoj Nautiyal

== Staff ==
Coach:

- Bhaskar Pillai (2018–19)
- Gursharan Singh (2019–20)
- Wasim Jaffer (2020–21)
- Manish Jha (2021–present)

== Competitions ==
=== Men's ===
- Uttarakhand Premier League

== Home ground ==
- Rajiv Gandhi International Cricket Stadium, Dehradun

== See also ==
- List of members of the Board of Control for Cricket in India
- Cricket in India
- Uttarakhand State Football Association
