= Ranjeet Darji =

Indian cricketer (born 1995)

Personal information
- Born: 3 February 1995 (age 31)
- Source: Cricinfo, 2 March 2019

Ranjeet Darji (born 3 February 1995) is an Indian cricketer. He made his Twenty20 debut for Services in the 2018–19 Syed Mushtaq Ali Trophy on 2 March 2019.
