= Irfan-ul-Haq =

Indian cricketer (born 1996)

Personal information
- Born: 8 April 1996 (age 30); Kupwara, India
- Source: ESPNcricinfo, 9 November 2021

Irfan-ul-Haq (born 8 April 1996) is an Indian cricketer. He made his Twenty20 debut on 9 November 2021, for Jammu & Kashmir in the 2021–22 Syed Mushtaq Ali Trophy.
