= Shivam Tiwari =

Indian cricketer (born 1996)

Personal information
- Born: 27 February 1996 (age 30); Sagar, Madhya Pradesh, India
- Source: Cricinfo, 27 February 2021

Shivam Tiwari (born 27 February 1996) is an Indian cricketer. He made his List A debut on 27 February 2021, for Services in the 2020–21 Vijay Hazare Trophy. He made his first-class debut on 3 March 2022, for Services in the 2021–22 Ranji Trophy.
