= Satish Jangir =

Indian cricketer (born 1998)

Personal information
- Born: 3 April 1998 (age 28)
- Source: Cricinfo, 27 February 2019

Satish Jangir (born 3 April 1998) is an Indian cricketer. He made his Twenty20 debut for Puducherry in the 2018–19 Syed Mushtaq Ali Trophy on 27 February 2019.
