= Nirupam Sen Chowdhary =

Indian cricketer (born 1990)

Personal information
- Full name: Nirupam Naruban Sen Chowdhary
- Born: 23 October 1990 (age 36); Agartala, Tripura, India
- Batting: Right-handed
- Bowling: Right-arm off-break
- Source: ESPNcricinfo, 11 October 2015

Nirupam Sen Chowdhary (born 23 October 1990) is an Indian first-class cricketer who plays for Tripura.
