= Irfan Khan (Indian cricketer) =

Indian cricketer (born 1988)

Personal information
- Born: 2 July 1988 (age 38); Sikandrabad, India
- Source: ESPNcricinfo, 18 October 2015

Irfan Khan (born 2 July 1988) is an Indian first-class cricketer who played for Services. He played in six first-class, ten List A, and twenty-one Twenty20 matches between 2009 and 2016.
