= Rajesh Singh (cricketer, born 1993) =

Indian cricketer (born 1993)

Personal information
- Born: 15 February 1993 (age 33); Hatwariya, Supaul, Bihar, India
- Batting: Left-handed
- Bowling: Left arm medium fast

Domestic team information
- Years: Team
- 2019–20: Bihar
- Source: Cricinfo, 8 November 2019

Rajesh Singh (born 15 February 1993) is an Indian cricketer. He made his Twenty20 debut on 8 November 2019, for Bihar in the 2019–20 Syed Mushtaq Ali Trophy.
