= Gaurav Gambhir =

Indian cricketer (born 1987)

Personal information
- Born: 26 November 1987 (age 38)
- Source: ESPNcricinfo, 11 November 2019

Gaurav Gambhir (born 26 November 1987) is an Indian cricketer. He made his Twenty20 debut on 11 November 2019, for Chandigarh in the 2019–20 Syed Mushtaq Ali Trophy.
