= Heramb Parab =

Indian cricketer (born 1998)

Personal information
- Born: 4 September 1998 (age 28); Goa, India
- Source: ESPNcricinfo, 9 November 2017

Heramb Parab (born 4 September 1998) is an Indian cricketer. He made his first-class debut for Goa in the 2017–18 Ranji Trophy on 9 November 2017. He made his List A debut on 25 September 2019, for Goa in the 2019–20 Vijay Hazare Trophy. He made his Twenty20 debut on 8 November 2019, for Goa in the 2019–20 Syed Mushtaq Ali Trophy.
