= Usman Pandit =

Indian cricketer (born 1994)

Personal information
- Born: 7 December 1994 (age 31); Srinagar, India
- Source: Cricinfo, 27 February 2021

Usman Pandit (born 7 December 1994) is an Indian cricketer. He made his List A debut on 27 February 2021, for Jammu and Kashmir in the 2020–21 Vijay Hazare Trophy.
