= Naren Reddy =

Indian cricketer (born 1994)

Personal information
- Born: 14 December 1994 (age 31)
- Source: ESPNcricinfo, 11 February 2018

Naren Reddy (born 14 December 1994) is an Indian cricketer. He made his List A debut for Andhra in the 2017–18 Vijay Hazare Trophy on 11 February 2018.
