= Nitesh Hooda =

Indian cricketer (born 1999)

Personal information
- Full name: Nitesh Satyawan Hooda
- Born: 1 May 1999 (age 27); New Delhi, India
- Batting: Right handed
- Bowling: Right arm Medium
- Source: ESPNcricinfo, 27 February 2021

Nitesh Hooda (born 1 May 1999) is an Indian cricketer. He made his List A debut on 27 February 2021, for Haryana in the 2020–21 Vijay Hazare Trophy. He made his first-class debut on 24 February 2022, for Haryana in the 2021–22 Ranji Trophy.
