= Rakesh Thakur =

Indian cricketer (born 1991)

Personal information
- Born: 10 September 1991 (age 35); Ratlam, Madhya Pradesh, India
- Batting: Right-handed
- Role: Wicketkeeper
- Source: Cricinfo, 11 January 2021

Rakesh Thakur (born 10 September 1991) is an Indian cricketer. He made his Twenty20 debut on 11 January 2021, for Goa in the 2020–21 Syed Mushtaq Ali Trophy.
