= Piyush Joshi =

Indian cricketer (born 1996)

Personal information
- Born: 27 May 1996 (age 30)
- Source: Cricinfo, 28 November 2018

Piyush Joshi (born 27 May 1996) is an Indian cricketer. He made his first-class debut for Uttarakhand in the 2018–19 Ranji Trophy on 28 November 2018. He made his Twenty20 debut on 10 January 2021, for Uttarakhand in the 2020–21 Syed Mushtaq Ali Trophy.
