= Devender Lochab =

Indian cricketer (born 1992)

Personal information
- Born: 5 November 1992 (age 34); Jhajjar, Haryana, India
- Source: ESPNcricinfo, 20 November 2018

Devender Lohchab (born 5 November 1992) is an Indian cricketer. He made his first-class debut for Services in the 2014–15 Ranji Trophy on 7 December 2014. he born in village Bupania district Jhajjar, Haryana. He start playing cricket in Gulia cricket academy in Badli. He is serve in Indian Navy.
