= F. B. Colony Ground =

Cricket ground

- Alembic No 2 Ground
- Location: Vadodara, India
- Establishment: 2021
- As of 7 November 2021; Source: ESPNcricinfo

The F. B. Colony Ground, previously known as the Alembic No 2 Ground, is a cricket ground in Vadodara, India. It was inaugurated in September 2009, with the first matches taking place in the 2010/11 cricket season. It was selected as one of the venues for the 2020–21 Syed Mushtaq Ali Trophy and the 2021–22 Syed Mushtaq Ali Trophy tournaments.

== See also ==
- List of cricket grounds in India
