= Mohit Mongia =

Indian cricketer (born 1999)

Personal information
- Full name: Mohit Nayan Mongia
- Born: 20 July 1999 (age 27)
- Batting: Right-handed
- Bowling: Slow left-arm orthodox
- Relatives: Nayan Mongia (father)

Domestic team information
- Years: Team
- Baroda
- Source: ESPNcricinfo, 21 February 2019

Mohit Mongia (born 20 June 1999) is an Indian cricketer. He made his Twenty20 debut for Baroda in the 2018–19 Syed Mushtaq Ali Trophy on 21 February 2019. He is popularly known as, "Phantom of Long Stop" by his fans.
