= Suvankar Bal =

Indian cricketer (born 1995)

Personal information
- Full name: Suvankar Samir Krishna Bal
- Born: 3 November 1995 (age 31); Kolkata, West Bengal, India
- Batting: Right-handed
- Bowling: Right arm off break

Domestic team information
- Years: Team
- 2020/21–: Bengal
- Source: Cricinfo, 3 March 2021

Suvankar Samir Krishna Bal (born 3 November 1995) is an Indian cricketer. He is a right-handed batter who has played for Bengal in all three forms from 2020/21 season till 2023. He can bowl off break but has not been called on in senior matches.

Bal made his Twenty20 debut for Bengal in the 2020–21 Syed Mushtaq Ali Trophy on 10 January 2021. He made his List A debut for Bengal in the 2020–21 Vijay Hazare Trophy on 27 February 2021.

Bal made his debut in first-class cricket on 17 January 2023, playing for Bengal against Haryana in the 2022–23 Ranji Trophy. Batting at number six, he scored 30 out of 419 and helped Bengal to win by an innings and 50 runs. Bal did not bowl. He completed one catch to dismiss Yuvraj Singh in Haryana first innings.
