= Kunal Dabas =

Indian cricketer (born 1998)

Personal information
- Born: 21 May 1998 (age 28)
- Source: ESPNcricinfo, 14 November 2019

Kunal Dabas (born 21 May 1998) is an Indian cricketer. He made his Twenty20 debut on 14 November 2019, for Bihar in the 2019–20 Syed Mushtaq Ali Trophy.
