= Vishal Gite =

Indian cricketer (born 1992)

Personal information
- Born: 25 November 1992 (age 33)
- Source: Cricinfo, 21 February 2019

Vishal Gite (born 25 November 1992) is an Indian cricketer. He made his Twenty20 debut for Maharashtra in the 2018–19 Syed Mushtaq Ali Trophy on 21 February 2019.
