= Hitesh Walunj =

Indian cricketer (born 1993)

Personal information
- Born: 3 April 1993 (age 33)
- Batting: Right-handed
- Bowling: Slow left arm orthodox

Domestic team information
- Years: Team
- 2018–19: Maharashtra

Career statistics
Competition	FC
Matches	7
Runs scored	35
Batting average	5.00
100s/50s	0/0
Top score	13*
Balls bowled	1,849
Wickets	41
Bowling average	20.24
5 wickets in innings	4
10 wickets in match	1
Best bowling	8/70
Catches/stumpings	3/–
- Source: ESPNcricinfo, 23 February 2024

Hitesh Walunj (born 3 April 1993) is an Indian cricketer. He made his Twenty20 debut for Maharashtra in the 2018–19 Syed Mushtaq Ali Trophy on 2 March 2019.
