= Vipul Mehta =

Vipul Mehta may refer to:

- Vipul Mehta (director)
- Vipul Mehta (singer)
