= Kamal Das =

Indian cricketer (born 1988)

Personal information
- Full name: Kamal Sudhir Das
- Born: 2 May 1988 (age 38); Sataria, Tripura
- Source: ESPNcricinfo, 2 March 2019

Kamal Das (born 2 May 1988) is an Indian cricketer. He made his first-class debut for Tripura in the 2011–12 Ranji Trophy on 3 November 2011.
