= Jaideep Bhambhu =

Indian cricketer (born 1999)

Personal information
- Full name: Jaideep Anoop Bhambhu
- Born: 19 March 1999 (age 27); Gurgaon, Haryana, India
- Batting: Right-handed
- Bowling: Right arm medium fast
- Source: ESPNcricinfo, 21 February 2021

Jaideep Bhambhu (born 19 March 1999) is an Indian cricketer. He made his List A debut on 21 February 2021, for Haryana in the 2020–21 Vijay Hazare Trophy. He made his Twenty20 debut on 4 November 2021, for Haryana in the 2021–22 Syed Mushtaq Ali Trophy.
