= Kunal Chandela =

Indian cricketer (born 1994)

Personal information
- Born: 7 July 1994 (age 32); Delhi, India
- Batting: Right-handed
- Bowling: Right arm medium

Domestic team information
- Years: Team
- 2017–2020: Delhi
- 2021-present: Uttarakhand
- Source: ESPNcricinfo, 25 November 2017

Kunal Chandela (born 7 July 1994) is an Indian cricketer. He played as right hand batter and right-arm medium-pace bowler. He played for Delhi and currently plays for Uttarakhand in domestic cricket.

He made his first-class debut for Delhi in the 2017–18 Ranji Trophy on 25 November 2017. He made his List A debut for Prime Bank Cricket Club in the 2017–18 Dhaka Premier Division Cricket League on 7 February 2018. He made his Twenty20 debut on 10 January 2021, for Uttarakhand in the 2020–21 Syed Mushtaq Ali Trophy.
