= Vijay Sharma (cricketer) =

Indian cricketer (born 1998)

Personal information
- Born: 20 September 1998 (age 28); Dehradun, Uttarakhand, India
- Source: Cricinfo, 21 February 2019

Vijay Sharma (born 20 September 1998) is an Indian cricketer. He made his Twenty20 debut for Uttarakhand in the 2018–19 Syed Mushtaq Ali Trophy on 21 February 2019. He made his List A debut on 8 December 2021, for Uttarakhand in the 2021–22 Vijay Hazare Trophy.
