= Vivek Vashisth =

Indian cricketer (born 1998)

Personal information
- Born: 6 November 1998 (age 28)
- Source: Cricinfo, 23 February 2021

Vivek Vashisth (born 6 November 1998) is an Indian cricketer. He made his List A debut on 23 February 2021, for Haryana in the 2020–21 Vijay Hazare Trophy.
