= Mandeep Singh (cricketer, born 1999) =

Indian cricketer (born 1999)

Personal information
- Born: 10 February 1999 (age 27)
- Source: ESPNcricinfo, 13 January 2021

Mandeep Singh (born 10 February 1999) is an Indian cricketer. He made his Twenty20 debut on 13 January 2021, for Chandigarh in the 2020–21 Syed Mushtaq Ali Trophy. He made his List A debut on 21 February 2021, for Chandigarh in the 2020–21 Vijay Hazare Trophy.
