= Pratik Sargade =

Indian cricketer (born 1989)

Personal information
- Full name: Pratik Sargade
- Born: 12 October 1989 (age 37)
- Source: Cricinfo, 28 February 2019

Pratik Sargade (born 12 October 1989) is an Indian cricketer. He made his Twenty20 debut for Puducherry in the 2018–19 Syed Mushtaq Ali Trophy on 22 February 2019.
