= Mohit Jangra =

Indian cricketer (born 1999)

Personal information
- Born: 27 September 1999 (age 27); Lakhimpur, Assam, India
- Batting: Left-handed
- Bowling: Left-arm medium-fast
- Role: All-rounder
- Source: ESPNcricinfo, 2 March 2019

Mohit Jangra (born 27 September 1999) is an Indian cricketer. He made his Twenty20 debut for Uttar Pradesh in the 2018–19 Syed Mushtaq Ali Trophy on 2 March 2019. He made his List A debut on 7 October 2019, for Uttar Pradesh in the 2019–20 Vijay Hazare Trophy. He made his first-class debut on 17 December 2019, for Uttar Pradesh in the 2019–20 Ranji Trophy.
