= Menariya =

Menaria
मेनारिया

Regions with significant populations
- India

Languages
- Hindi, Mewari, English

Religion
- Hinduism

Related ethnic groups
- Mehta, Paneri, Joshi, Vyas

Menaria (Menariya, Menaria) is a warrior community of Brahmin community found in south Rajasthan, mainly across Udaipur, Chittorgarh, Bhilwara and Rajsamand, Nimbahera Banswara.

== About ==
Menaria (मेनारिया in Hindi), also known as Menaria, Menaria Samaj is a caste inhabiting the Indian state of Rajasthan. Local tradition holds that Menaria Brahmins once served as soldiers for the Mewar kingdom. Historical accounts (notably of Holi-era celebrations in Menar village) recall Menaria aiding Maharana Udai Singh against Mughal forces in the 16th centurytimesofindia.indiatimes.com. Menar village Holi ritual (‘Baroodon-ki-Holi’) commemorates how local Menaria men “captured the Mughal booth and defeated the enemy”, a victory still celebrated on Jamra Beej.

Many people from the community are famous as professional chefs. Several generations of Menaria cooks have worked in the homes of India’s elite – for example, Poonamchand Aklingdasot of Menar cooked for Lata Mangeshkar’s family and then spent ten years as personal chef to Dhirubhai and Kokilaben Ambani. Bhanwarlalji Mangilalji Menaria cooked for Prime Minister Narendra Modi during Modi’s 2016 Tokyo visit.
