= Vipul Krishna =

Indian cricketer (born 2001)

Personal information
- Born: 9 February 2001 (age 25); Sitamarhi, Bihar, India

Domestic team information
- Years: Team
- 2019: Bihar
- Source: Cricinfo, 10 October 2019

Vipul Krishna (born 9 February 2001) is an Indian cricketer. He made his List A debut on 10 October 2019, for Bihar in the 2019–20 Vijay Hazare Trophy. He made his Twenty20 debut on 8 November 2019, for Bihar in the 2019–20 Syed Mushtaq Ali Trophy.
