= Dr PVG Raju ACA Sports Complex =

Cricket stadium

- Interactive map of Dr PVG Raju ACA Sports Complex
- Full name: Dr PVG Raju Andhra Cricket Association Sports Complex Ground
- Former names: ACA Academy Stadium
- Location: Vizianagram, Andhra Pradesh
- Coordinates: 18.0656°N 83.4066°E
- Owner: Andhra Cricket Association
- Operator: Andhra Cricket Association
- Capacity: 50000

Construction
- Opened: 2013
- Cost: ₹ 5 crore

Website
- ESPNcricinfo Last updated on: 22 September 2019

Ground information
- Country: India

International information
- First women's T20I: 25 January 2014: India v Sri Lanka
- Last women's T20I: 26 January 2014: India v Sri Lanka
- As of 9 September 2020; Source: CricketArchive

Dr PVG Raju ACA Sports Complex is a cricket stadium located in Vizianagaram of the Indian state of Andhra Pradesh. It was inaugurated on 15 June 2013. The stadium is home of North Zone Cricket Academy of Andhra Cricket Association which was inaugurated at a cost of ₹50 million (US$520,000) on a 10 acres (4.0 ha) near MVGR College of Engineering. The stadium has facilities such as pavilion, lodging and boarding facilities and health centre.

== Profile ==
It has hosted five first-class matches in 2014 when Andhra cricket team played against Kerala cricket team. The stadium hosted five Twenty20 matches in 2014 when Andhra cricket team played against Karnataka cricket team. The stadium hosted five Women's Twenty20 International matches in 2014 when India women cricket team played against Sri Lanka national cricket team.
