= Pinninti Tapaswi =

Indian cricketer (born 1996)

Personal information
- Born: 13 August 1996 (age 30); Vizianagram, Andhra Pradesh, India
- Source: Cricinfo, 26 September 2019

Pinninti Tapaswi (born 13 August 1996) is an Indian cricketer. He made his List A debut on 25 September 2019, for Andhra in the 2019–20 Vijay Hazare Trophy. He made his Twenty20 debut on 5 November 2021, for Andhra in the 2021–22 Syed Mushtaq Ali Trophy. He made his first-class debut on 17 February 2022, for Andhra Pradesh in the 2021–22 Ranji Trophy.
