= Ashok Menaria =

Indian cricketer

Personal information
- Full name: Ashok Lakshminarayan Menaria
- Born: 29 October 1990 (age 36); Udaipur, Rajasthan, India
- Batting: Left-handed
- Bowling: Slow left arm orthodox
- Role: All-rounder

Domestic team information
- Years: Team
- 2008/09–present: Rajasthan
- 2011–2013: Rajasthan Royals

Career statistics
Competition	FC	LA	T20
Matches	34	32	41
Runs scored	2,088	691	544
Batting average	41.76	24.67	19.42
100s/50s	6/8	0/6	0/1
Top score	230	72	52
Balls bowled	1,339	584	255
Wickets	13	18	8
Bowling average	55.69	24.83	31.87
5 wickets in innings	0	1	0
10 wickets in match	0	0	0
Best bowling	3/7	5/38	3/19
Catches/stumpings	13/–	10/–	12/–
- Source: ESPNcricinfo, 31 December 2013

Ashok Menaria (born 29 October 1990) is an Indian cricketer. He is a left-handed batsman and slow left arm orthodox bowler who plays for Rajasthan. From 2011 to 2013, he played for Rajasthan Royals in the Indian Premier League (IPL).

Menaria began his competitive cricketing career playing for Rajasthan Under-15s, in their winless 2005-06 Polly Umrigar Trophy run. The following season he represented the Under-17s team, and, in a game against Karnataka Under-17s, scored the second-highest innings total in the 2006-07 Vijay Merchant Trophy - starring alongside Ankit Lamba in an unbeaten partnership of 397 - himself contributing 227 of these runs.

Following four appearances in Rajasthan Under-19s' 2008-09 Vinoo Mankad Trophy campaign, Menaria made his first-class debut against Mumbai in November 2008. He appeared in 79 first-class matches for Rajasthan and scored 4677 runs. His best score is 230. Menaria also took 20 wickets in first class cricket.

From 2011 to 2013, Ashok Menaria was a member of the Rajasthan Royals in the Indian Premier League.

Menaria captained India's 15-man squad for the 2010 Under-19 Cricket World Cup. In the World Cup in five innings, he only scored 31 runs and got six wickets.

He was the leading run-scorer for Khelaghar Samaj Kallyan Samity in the 2017–18 Dhaka Premier Division Cricket League, with 662 runs in 15 matches.
