= Pratik Salunke =

Indian cricketer (born 1991)

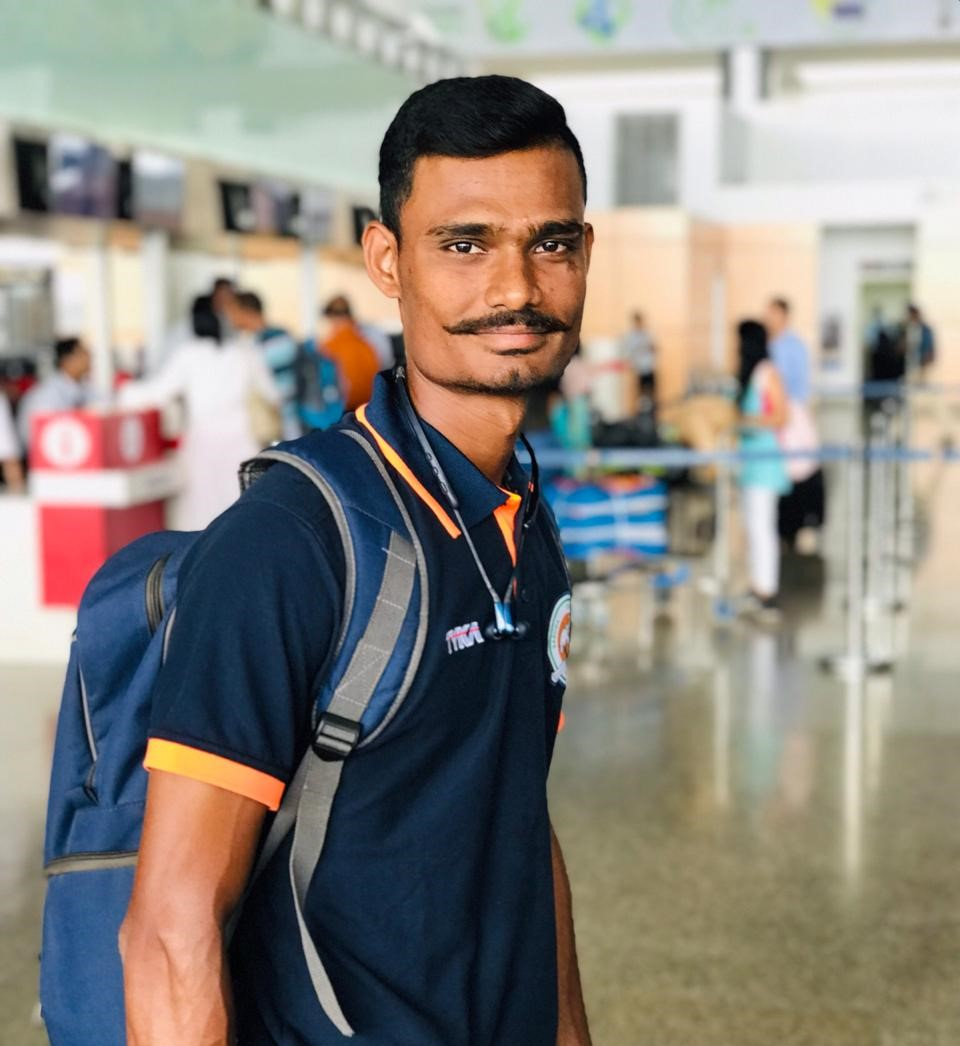

Personal information
- Born: 24 October 1991 (age 35); Vadodara, Gujarat, India
- Source: Cricinfo, 27 February 2019

Pratik Salunke (born 24 October 1991) is an Indian cricketer. He made his Twenty20 debut for Baroda in the 2018–19 Syed Mushtaq Ali Trophy on 27 February 2019.
