= Uttarakhand cricket team =

Uttarakhand men's cricket team

Uttarakhand
- League: Ranji Trophy (FC); Vijay Hazare Trophy (LA); Syed Mushtaq Ali Trophy (T20)
- Association: Cricket Association of Uttarakhand

Personnel
- Captain: Kunal Chandela
- Coach: Manish Jha

Team information
- Founded: 2018
- Home ground: Rajiv Gandhi International Cricket Stadium
- Capacity: 25,000

History
- First-class debut: vs. Bihar, Rajiv Gandhi International Cricket Stadium, Dehradun; 1–4 November 2018
- List A debut: vs. Bihar, Shastri Maidan, Anand; 20 September 2018
- Twenty20 debut: vs. Services, Palam B Ground, New Delhi; 21 February 2019
- Ranji Trophy wins: 0
- Vijay Hazare Trophy wins: 0
- Syed Mushtaq Ali Trophy wins: 0
- Official website: CAU
FC kit
LA/T20 kit

The Uttarakhand cricket team is a cricket team that represents the state of Uttarakhand in Indian domestic competitions.

== Background ==
In July 2018, the Board of Control for Cricket in India (BCCI) named the team as one of the nine new sides that would compete in domestic tournaments for the 2018–19 season, including the Ranji Trophy, the Vijay Hazare Trophy and the Syed Mushtaq Ali Trophy.

== Coaches ==
Season	Coach	Ref.
2018–19	Bhaskar Pillai	
2019–20	Gursharan Singh	
2020–21	Wasim Jaffer	
2021–present	Manish Jha	

== Current squad ==
Name	Birth date	Batting style	Bowling style	Notes
Batsmen
Kunal Chandela	7 July 1994 (age 32)	Right-handed	Right-arm medium	Captain
Shashwat Dangwal	12 September 2003 (age 23)	Left-handed	Right-arm off break	
Yuvraj Chaudhary	6 October 2001 (age 25)	Left-handed	Slow left-arm orthodox	
Aarav Mahajan	25 June 2006 (age 20)	Right-handed	Right-arm off break	
Aanjaneya Suryavanshi	26 January 2003 (age 23)	Right-handed	Right-arm off break	
Lakshya Raichandani	15 October 2008 (age 18)	Right-handed	Right-arm off break	
Dega Nischal	19 October 1994 (age 32)	Right-handed	Right-arm leg break	
Tejasvi Jaiswal	2 March 1997 (age 29)	Left-handed	Right-arm medium	
All-rounders
Jagadeesha Suchith	16 January 1994 (age 32)	Left-handed	Slow left-arm orthodox	
Avneesh Sudha	20 November 2001 (age 24)	Right-handed	Right-arm off break	
Wicket-keepers
Saurabh Rawat	21 December 1997 (age 28)	Right-handed		
Sanskar Rawat	15 June 2005 (age 21)	Left-handed		
Vijay Sharma	20 September 1998 (age 28)	Right-handed		
Spin bowler
Mayank Mishra	9 October 1990 (age 36)	Left-handed	Slow left-arm orthodox	
Pace bowlers
Abhay Negi	18 October 1992 (age 34)	Right-handed	Right-arm medium	
Devendra Bora	6 December 2000 (age 25)	Right-handed	Right-arm medium	
Agnivesh Ayachi	15 June 1995 (age 31)	Right-handed	Right-arm medium-fast	
Janmejay Joshi	21 June 2001 (age 25)	Left-handed	Right-arm medium-fast	
Jagmohan Nagarkoti	12 May 2000 (age 26)	Right-handed	Left-arm medium-fast	
Akash Madhwal	25 November 1993 (age 32)	Right-handed	Right-arm medium-fast	
Aditya Rawat	6 August 2007 (age 19)	Right-handed	Right-arm medium	
Deepak Dhapola	26 June 1990 (age 36)	Right-handed	Right-arm medium	

Updated as on 17 November 2026

== Competitive record ==
Ranji Trophy (First-class)
Season	Group	Matches	Wins	Losses	Draws	No Result	Performance
2018–19	Plate Group	9	6	1	2	0	Quarter-finals
2019–20	Group C	9	0	7	2	0	Group Stage
2020–21	Season cancelled due to the COVID-19 pandemic						
2021–22	Group E	4	2	2	0	0	Quarter-finals
2022–23	Group A	8	3	1	4	0	Quarter-finals
2023–24	Group D	7	2	2	3	0	Group Stage
2024–25	Group B	5	1	2	2	0	Group Stage
2025–26	Group C	9	5	2	2	0	Semi-finals
2026–27	Group D	4	1	1	2	0	TBD
Total		55	20	18	17	0	Win %: 36.36

Vijay Hazare Trophy (List A)
Season	Group	Matches	Wins	Losses	Ties	No Result	Performance
2018–19	Plate Group	8	7	1	0	0	Group Stage
2019–20	Plate Group	9	5	1	0	3	Group Stage
2020–21	Plate Group	6	5	1	0	0	Eliminator Stage
2021–22	Group D	5	1	4	0	0	Group Stage
2022–23	Group D	6	2	4	0	0	Group Stage
2023–24	Group C	7	5	2	0	0	Group Stage
2024–25	Group A	7	3	4	0	0	Group Stage
2025–26	Group C	7	3	4	0	0	Group Stage
2026–27	Group A	TBD					
Total		55	31	21	0	3	Win %: 56.36

Syed Mushtaq Ali Trophy (T20)
Season	Group	Matches	Wins	Losses	Ties	No Result	Performance
2018–19	Group E	7	4	2	0	1	Group Stage
2019–20	Group A	6	2	4	0	0	Group Stage
2020–21	Group C	5	1	4	0	0	Group Stage
2021–22	Group E	5	0	5	0	0	Group Stage
2022–23	Group A	7	4	3	0	0	Group Stage
2023–24	Group D	6	2	3	1	0	Group Stage
2024–25	Group B	7	2	5	0	0	Group Stage
2025–26	Group D	7	2	5	0	0	Group Stage
2026–27	Group D	TBD					
Total		50	17	31	1	1	Win %: 34.00

In September 2018, they lost their opening fixture of the 2018–19 Vijay Hazare Trophy, to Bihar, by 5 wickets. In the Plate Group fixture between Uttarakhand and Sikkim, Karn Kaushal made the first double-century in the history of the Vijay Hazare Trophy, scoring 202 runs.

In their first season in the Vijay Hazare Trophy, they finished in second place in the Plate Group, with seven wins and one loss from their eight matches. Karn Kaushal finished as the leading run-scorer, with 489 runs, and Deepak Dhapola was the leading wicket-taker for the team, with eleven dismissals.

In November 2018, in their opening match of the 2018–19 Ranji Trophy, they beat Bihar by ten wickets. They went on to win the Plate Group and advanced to the quarter-finals of the tournament. However, in their quarter-final match they lost to Vidarbha by an innings and 115 runs to be knocked out of the tournament.

In March 2019, Uttarakhand finished third in Group E of the 2018–19 Syed Mushtaq Ali Trophy, with four wins from their seven matches. Karn Kaushal was the leading run-scorer for the team in the tournament, with 176 runs, and Sunny Rana was the leading wicket-taker, with nine dismissals.

== See also ==
- India national cricket team
- Uttarakhand women's cricket team
- Cricket Association of Uttarakhand
- Cricket in India
- Uttarakhand football team
