= Vivrant Sharma =

Indian cricketer (born 1999)

Personal information
- Born: 30 October 1999 (age 27); Jammu, Jammu and Kashmir, India
- Batting: Left-handed
- Bowling: Leg-Break Googly
- Role: All-rounder

Domestic team information
- Years: Team
- 2021–present: Jammu and Kashmir
- 2023: Sunrisers Hyderabad
- FC debut: 13 December 2022 Jammu & Kashmir v Madhya Pradesh
- List A debut: 21 February 2021 Jammu & Kashmir v Saurashtra

Career statistics
Competition	FC	LA	T20
Matches	19	27	24
Runs scored	805	1,020	403
Batting average	24.00	39.23	23.87
100s/50s	1/3	2/6	0/3
Top score	139	154*	69
Balls bowled	180	432	94
Wickets	1	10	8
Bowling average	129.00	48.30	15.62
5 wickets in innings	0	0	0
10 wickets in match	0	0	0
Best bowling	1/22	4/22	4/13
Catches/stumpings	13/0	13/0	10/0
- Source: Cricinfo, 11 April 2025

Vivrant Sharma (born 30 October 1999) is an Indian domestic cricketer. An integral part of the Jammu & Kashmir middle order, he came into the limelight for his explosive batting in the 2022–23 Vijay Hazare Trophy. He was Jammu & Kashmir's highest run scorer in the tournament amassing 395 runs at an average of 56.42.

He made his Twenty20 debut on 4 November 2021, for Jammu & Kashmir in the 2021–22 Syed Mushtaq Ali Trophy. After spending a year with Sunrisers Hyderabad as a net bowler, he was bought by them for Rs 2.6 crore, 13 times his base price in the 2023 Indian Premier League auction. He was released by Sunrisers Hyderabad in November 2023 after just one season.

== Early life ==
Vivrant Sharma was born on 30 October 1999 in the state of Jammu and Kashmir.

After losing his father Sushil Sharma at the age of 14 to a kidney failure, Vivrant's brother Vikrant took over the family responsibilities and made Vivrant concentrate on developing his cricket skills.

Vivrant started off as a right-handed batter, but in his sixth standard, following the footsteps of his brother Vikrant, he switched to become a left-handed batter and a leg spin bowler.
