= Mohit Ahlawat (cricketer) =

Indian cricketer (born 1995)

Personal information
- Born: 25 December 1995 (age 30); Delhi, India
- Batting: Right-handed
- Role: Wicketkeeper

Domestic team information
- Years: Team
- 2018–19: Services
- Source: ESPNcricinfo, 4 October 2015

Mohit Ahlawat (born 25 December 1995) is an Indian cricketer who plays for Services. On 7 February 2017, Ahlawat became the first player to score a triple century in a twenty-overs match: he made 300 runs in 72 balls in a local T20 match out of the team score of 416 for the loss of two wickets.

He made his Twenty20 debut for Services in the 2018–19 Syed Mushtaq Ali Trophy on 21 February 2019. He made his List A debut on 27 September 2019, for Services in the 2019–20 Vijay Hazare Trophy.
