= Himanshu Bisht =

Indian cricketer (born 1996)

Personal information
- Born: 17 November 1996 (age 29); Pithoragarh, Uttarakhand, India
- Source: ESPNcricinfo, 21 February 2019

Himanshu Bisht (born 17 November 1996) is an Indian cricketer. He made his Twenty20 debut for Uttarakhand in the 2018–19 Syed Mushtaq Ali Trophy on 21 February 2019. He made his List A debut on 12 December 2021, for Uttarakhand in the 2021–22 Vijay Hazare Trophy.
