= Varun Choudhary =

Indian cricketer (born 1993)

Personal information
- Full name: Varun Kulbir Choudhary
- Born: 26 October 1993 (age 33); Jammu, India
- Source: Cricinfo, 20 September 2018

Varun Choudhary is an Indian cricketer. He made his List A debut for Services in the 2018–19 Vijay Hazare Trophy on 19 September 2018. He made his Twenty20 debut on 9 November 2019, for Services in the 2019–20 Syed Mushtaq Ali Trophy.
