= Swapnil Singh =

Indian cricketer (born 1991)

Personal information
- Full name: Swapnil Kamlesh Singh
- Born: 22 January 1991 (age 35); Raebareli, Uttar Pradesh, India
- Batting: Right-handed
- Bowling: Slow left-arm orthodox
- Role: Bowler

Domestic team information
- Years: Team
- 2005/06–2019/20: Baroda
- 2016–2017: Kings XI Punjab
- 2021/22–2024/25: Uttarakhand
- 2023: Lucknow Super Giants
- 2024- Present: Royal Challengers Bengaluru
- 2025/26: Tripura

Career statistics
Competition	FC	LA	T20
Matches	83	68	90
Runs scored	2,981	1,188	988
Batting average	25.47	23.76	22.45
100s/50s	2/16	0/6	0/2
Top score	164	82	52
Balls bowled	12,555	2,935	1,546
Wickets	212	71	73
Bowling average	29.29	30.54	25.86
5 wickets in innings	13	1	1
10 wickets in match	0	0	0
Best bowling	7/66	5/25	6/19
Catches/stumpings	53/–	23/–	32/–
- Source: CricketArchive, 28 October 2025

Swapnil Kamlesh Singh (born 22 January 1991) is an Indian cricketer who plays for Tripura and Royal Challengers Bengaluru. He is a bowler who bats right-handed and bowls slow left-arm orthodox.

He made his first-class debut for Baroda in 2006 at the age of 14 and was a member of the Mumbai Indians squad in 2008. In a match of the 2014–15 Syed Mushtaq Ali Trophy against Saurashtra, he took six wickets for 19 runs from four overs.

He was the leading run-scorer for Baroda in the 2017–18 Ranji Trophy, with 565 runs in six matches. In July 2018, he was named in the squad for India Blue for the 2018–19 Duleep Trophy. He was bought for INR 10 lakhs by Kings XI Punjab at the 2016 IPL auction and made his Indian Premier League debut during the season. He played for Lucknow Super Giants in 2023 and for Royal Challengers Bengaluru in 2024.
