= Mohit Kumar (cricketer, born 1996) =

Indian cricketer (born 1996)

Personal information
- Born: 25 September 1996 (age 30); Gurgaon, Haryana, India
- Source: ESPNcricinfo, 22 February 2019

Mohit Kumar (born 25 September 1996) is an Indian cricketer. He made his Twenty20 debut for Services in the 2018–19 Syed Mushtaq Ali Trophy on 22 February 2019. He made his List A debut on 23 February 2021, for Services in the 2020–21 Vijay Hazare Trophy.
