= Services cricket team =

Indian cricket team

Personnel
- Captain: Rajat Paliwal (FC); Mohit Ahlawat (LA & T20)
- Owner: Services Sports Control Board

Team information
- Founded: 1926
- Home ground: Palam A Stadium, Delhi

History
- First-class debut: Marylebone Cricket Club in 1926 at Lawrence Gardens, Lahore
- Ranji Trophy wins: 0
- Vijay Hazare Trophy wins: 0
- Syed Mushtaq Ali Trophy wins: 0
- Official website: SSCB

The Services cricket team plays in the Ranji Trophy, the main domestic first-class cricket competition in India. Under the auspices of the Services Sports Control Board, they represent the Indian Armed Forces. Their home ground is the Palam A Stadium, Palam Air Force Base, New Delhi.

== Records ==
The Services team first played in the Ranji Trophy in 1949–50. They played in the North Zone of the competition until 2001–02, and have played in the Plate Group and other lower-ranked groups since 2002–03, except for one season, where they played in the Elite Group, during 2005–06. Their strongest period was the 1950s: between 1950–51 and 1959–60 they reached the semi-finals six times and the final twice, losing to Bombay in 1956–57 by an innings, and to Baroda in 1957–58, also by an innings.

As of March 2026, Services had played 379 first-class matches, with 102 wins, 131 losses, and 146 draws; 33 of their victories have been over Jammu and Kashmir. Their highest first-class score is 250 not out by Yashpal Singh against Tripura in 2012–13. The best bowling figures are 8 for 27 by Amit Shukla against Haryana in 2025–26.

Services reached the semi-finals of the Vijay Hazare Trophy for the first time in the 2021–22 season. Their best finish in the Syed Mushtaq Ali Trophy was in the 2019–20 season, where they finished third in their group with 4 wins and 2 losses.

Services set the world record for the highest successful run chase in first-class cricket without losing a wicket when they chased 376 runs against Odisha in the group stage in the 2024–25 Ranji Trophy. It was also the second-highest successful fourth-innings run-chase in the history of the Ranji Trophy.

== Honours ==
- Ranji Trophy
  - Runners-up (2): 1956–57, 1957–58

== Notable players ==
Services players who have played Test cricket for India, along with year of Test debut:

- Hemu Adhikari (1947)
- Kanwar Rai Singh (1947) (primarily played for Southern Punjab)
- Bal Dani (1952)
- Chandrasekhar Gadkari (1953)
- Narain Swamy (1955)
- Surendra Nath (1958)
- Apoorva Sengupta (1959)
- V. M. Muddiah (1959)

== Current squad ==
Name	Birth date	Birthplace	Batting style	Bowling style	Notes
Batsmen
Rajat Paliwal	24 December 1991 (age 34)	Sonepat, HR	Right-handed	Right-arm off-break	First-class & List A Captain
Ravi Chauhan	17 September 1993 (age 33)	New Delhi, DL	Right-handed	Right-arm leg-break	
Irfan Ali	30 December 2000 (age 25)		Right-handed	Right-arm off-break	
Vineet Dhankhar	3 May 2004 (age 22)		Right-handed	Right-arm leg break	
Shubham Rohilla	10 March 1998 (age 28)	Rohtak, HR	Left-handed	Right-arm leg break	
Kunwar Pathak	23 November 1998 (age 27)	Amritsar, PB	Left-handed	Right-arm off break	
Sufiyan Alam	2 April 1995 (age 31)	New Delhi, DL	Right-handed	Right-arm off break	
Suraj Vashisht	27 July 2001 (age 25)	Delhi, DL	Right-handed	Right-arm off break	
All-Rounders
Arjun Sharma	25 May 1996 (age 30)	Jalandhar, PB	Left-handed	Slow left-arm orthodox	
Nitin Tanwar	9 October 1996 (age 30)	Delhi, DL	Right-handed	Right-arm off break	
Irfan Khan	2 July 1988 (age 38)	Delhi, DL	Right-handed	Right-arm medium	
Wicket-keepers
Nakul Sharma	25 September 1993 (age 33)	Delhi, DL	Right-handed		
Mohit Ahlawat	25 December 1995 (age 30)	Delhi, DL	Right-handed		Twenty20 Captain
Devender Lochab	5 September 1992 (age 34)	Jhajjar, HR	Right-handed		
Arun Kumar	6 December 2002 (age 23)	Bhiwani, HR	Right-handed		
Spin Bowlers
Pulkit Narang	18 June 1994 (age 32)	New Delhi, DL	Right-handed	Right-arm off break	
Rahul Singh	12 September 1992 (age 34)	Kaithal, HR	Left-handed	Slow left-arm orthodox	
Arun Bamal	2 June 1997 (age 29)	Bhiwani, HR	Left-handed	Slow left-arm orthodox	
Pace Bowlers
Jayant Goyat	24 June 2005 (age 21)		Right-handed	Right-arm medium	
Mohit Jangra	27 September 1999 (age 27)	Lokhimpur, AS	Left-handed	Left-arm medium	
Raj Bahadur	5 October 1993 (age 33)	Allahabad, UP	Left-handed	Left-arm medium	
Vishal Gaur	3 July 2001 (age 25)	Meerut, UP	Left-handed	Left-arm medium	
Varun Choudhary	26 October 1993 (age 33)	Jammu, JK	Right-handed	Right-arm medium	
Virender Dagar	2 October 1997 (age 29)	Palwal, HR	Right-handed	Right-arm medium	
Mohit Kumar	25 September 1996 (age 30)	Gurgaon, HR	Right-handed	Right-arm medium	

Updated as on 16 November 2026
