= 2017–18 Ranji Trophy Group D =

Cricket tournament

2017-18 Ranji Trophy Group D
- The Ranji Trophy, awarded to the winners
- Dates: 6 October 2017 – 28 November 2017
- Administrator: BCCI
- Cricket format: First-class cricket
- Tournament format: Round-robin
- Host: India
- Participants: 7

The 2017–18 Ranji Trophy was the 84th season of the Ranji Trophy, the first-class cricket tournament in India. It was contested by 28 teams divided into four groups, each containing seven teams. The top two teams from Group D progressed to the quarterfinals of the competition. Vidarbha progressed to the knockout stage of the competition after beating Goa by an innings and 37 runs in round 6 of the tournament. They were joined by Bengal, after they drew against Goa in their final group-stage match.

== Teams ==
The following teams were placed in Group D, based on their average points in the previous three years:

- Bengal
- Chhattisgarh
- Goa
- Himachal Pradesh
- Punjab
- Services
- Vidarbha

== Points table ==
Team	Pld	W	L	D	A	Pts	NRR
Vidarbha	6	4	0	2	0	31	+0.358
Bengal	6	2	1	3	0	23	+0.367
Punjab	6	2	2	2	0	18	+0.609
Himachal Pradesh	6	1	1	4	0	14	+0.300
Chhattisgarh	6	1	3	2	0	13	–0.514
Services	6	1	2	3	0	10	–0.273
Goa	6	0	2	4	0	6	–0.700

- Top two teams advanced to the knockout stage

== Fixtures ==
=== Round 1 ===
6–9 October 2017
Scorecard

Himachal Pradesh	v	Punjab
729/8d (148 overs); Prashant Chopra 338 (363); Sandeep Sharma 4/149 (36 overs)		601 (154.3 overs); Abhishek Gupta 202 (203); Gurvinder Singh 6/162 (46 overs)
145/5 (40 overs); Paras Dogra 45* (71); Manpreet Gony 2/20 (9 overs)

Match drawn
Himachal Pradesh Cricket Association Stadium, Dharamshala
Umpires: Belur Ravi and Chirra Ravikanthreddy
Player of the match: Prashant Chopra (Himachal Pradesh)

- Himachal Pradesh won the toss and elected to bat.
- Priyanshu Khanduri (Himachal Pradesh), Abhishek Sharma, Abhishek Gupta and Anmolpreet Singh (Punjab) all made their first-class debuts.
- Prashant Chopra made 271 not out on the opening day, the second-most runs scored in one day in the Ranji Trophy and the joint-highest score made by a batsman for Himachal Pradesh.
- Chopra went on to make 338, the tenth-highest total by a batsman in the Ranji Trophy and the first triple-century by a batsman for Himachal Pradesh.
- Abhishek Gupta (Punjab) scored his maiden first-class century.

6–9 October 2017
Scorecard

Chhattisgarh	v	Goa
458 (161.3 overs); Manoj Singh 125 (322); Darshan Misal 5/79 (34 overs)		277 (122.1 overs); Sumiran Amonkar 79 (235); Sumit Ruikar 5/72 (46 overs)
		170/7 (67 overs) (f/o); Sumiran Amonkar 53 (135); Sumit Ruikar 5/29 (21 overs)

Match drawn
Goa Cricket Association Academy Ground, Porvorim
Umpires: Subrat Das and Sanjay Hazare
Player of the match: Sumit Ruikar (Chhattisgarh)

- Chhattisgarh won the toss and elected to bat.
- Manoj Singh (Chhattisgarh) scored his maiden first-class century.

6–9 October 2017
Scorecard

Bengal	v	Services
552/9d (137 overs); Sudip Chatterjee 115 (191); Sachidanand Pandey 4/108 (31 overs)		359 (111.2 overs); Navneet Singh 121 (284); Aamir Gani 5/109 (34.2 overs)
161/5d (22 overs); Abhishek Raman 40 (37); Diwesh Pathania 3/71 (10 overs)		212/7 (77 overs); Vikas Hathwala 64 (71); Kanishk Seth 2/18 (11 overs)

Match drawn
Palam A Stadium, Delhi
Umpires: Nitin Pandit and Pashchim Pathak
Player of the match: Navneet Singh (Services)

- Services won the toss and elected to field.
- Navneet Singh, Arun Bamal (Services), Boddupalli Amit and Kanishk Seth (Bengal) all made their first-class debuts.

=== Round 2 ===
14–17 October 2017
Scorecard

Punjab	v	Vidarbha
161 (42.2 overs); Abhishek Gupta 89 (93); Lalit Yadav 3/47 (16 overs)		505 (153.2 overs); Ganesh Satish 164 (245); Abhishek Sharma 4/136 (34.2 overs)
226 (72.1 overs); Abhishek Sharma 49 (86); Akshay Karnewar 6/47 (14.1 overs)

Vidarbha won by an innings and 117 runs
Punjab Cricket Association IS Bindra Stadium, Mohali
Umpires: Yeshwant Barde and Nand Kishore
Player of the match: Ganesh Satish (Vidarbha)

- Punjab won the toss and elected to bat.
- Raghu Sharma (Punjab) and Siddhesh Neral (Vidarbha) both made their first-class debuts.
- Akshay Karnewar (Vidarbha) took his maiden five-wicket haul in first-class cricket.

14–17 October 2017
Scorecard

Goa	v	Himachal Pradesh
255 (85.5 overs); Rituraj Singh 55* (61); Pankaj Jaswal 4/59 (19 overs)		625/7d (144 overs); Ankush Bains 143 (216); Saurabh Bandekar 2/140 (33 overs)
426/2 (111 overs); Swapnil Asnodkar 167 (228)

Match drawn
Himachal Pradesh Cricket Association Stadium, Dharamshala
Umpires: Sudhir Asnani and Abhijit Deshmukh
Player of the match: Pankaj Jaswal (Himachal Pradesh)

- Himachal Pradesh won the toss and elected to field.
- Ankit Kaushik (Himachal Pradesh) made his first-class debut.
- Pankaj Jaswal (Himachal Pradesh) made the second-fastest fifty in the history of the Ranji Trophy, doing so in 16 balls.

14–17 October 2017
Scorecard

Bengal	v	Chhattisgarh
529/7d (147.3 overs); Sudip Chatterjee 118 (191); Shubham Singh 4/162 (40.3 overs)		110 (39.5 overs); Ashutosh Singh 53 (98); Ashoke Dinda 7/21 (10.5 overs)
		259 (81.4 overs) (f/o); Abhimanyu Chauhan 115 (193); Mohammed Shami 6/61 (22 overs)

Bengal won by an innings and 160 runs
Shaheed Veer Narayan Singh International Cricket Stadium, Raipur
Umpires: Saiyed Khalid and Navdeep Singh
Player of the match: Ashoke Dinda (Bengal)

- Chhattisgarh won the toss and elected to field.
- Shubham Singh (Chhattisgarh) made his first-class debut.
- Manoj Tiwary (Bengal) played in his 100th first-class match.

=== Round 3 ===
24–27 October 2017
Scorecard

Punjab	v	Goa
635 (148.5 overs); Jiwanjot Singh 238 (293); Shadab Jakati 5/165 (46 overs)		246 (79.4 overs); Sagun Kamat 47 (97); Raghu Sharma 4/50 (15.4 overs)
		256 (88.1 overs) (f/o); Darshan Misal 64* (111); Vinay Choudhary 3/57 (29.1 overs)

Punjab won by an innings and 133 runs
Goa Cricket Association Academy Ground, Porvorim
Umpires: Ulhas Gandhe and Tapan Sharma
Player of the match: Jiwanjot Singh (Punjab)

- Punjab won the toss and elected to bat.

24–27 October 2017
Scorecard

Himachal Pradesh	v	Services
364 (116.3 overs); Nikhil Gangta 130 (268); Vikas Yadav 5/91 (37 overs)		215 (76.3 overs); Nitin Tanwar 55 (67); Gurvinder Singh 4/58 (22.3 overs)
176/9d (54.4 overs); Akash Vasisht 44 (73); Diwesh Pathania 3/36 (12.4 overs)		228 (78.4 overs); Ravi Chauhan 97 (209); Gurvinder Singh 6/52 (18.4 overs)

Himachal Pradesh won by 97 runs
Palam A Stadium, Delhi
Umpires: Sivasubramaniyan Shankar and Krishnaraj Srinath
Player of the match: Gurvinder Singh (Himachal Pradesh)

- Himachal Pradesh won the toss and elected to bat.
- Nitin Tanwar (Services) made his first-class debut.

24–27 October 2017
Scorecard

Chhattisgarh	v	Vidarbha
489 (163.2 overs); Amandeep Khare 210 (453); Umesh Yadav 3/87 (28 overs)		435 (124.4 overs); Faiz Fazal 125 (229); Sumit Ruikar 4/98 (27 overs)
195/9 (52 overs); Jatin Saxena 75 (110); Akshay Karnewar 3/43 (17 overs)

Match drawn
Vidarbha Cricket Association Stadium, Nagpur
Umpires: Anil Dandekar and Vineet Kulkarni
Player of the match: Amandeep Khare (Chhattisgarh)

- Vidarbha won the toss and elected to field.

=== Round 4 ===
1–4 November 2017
Scorecard

Bengal	v	Himachal Pradesh
419 (121.3 overs); Abhishek Raman 176 (242); Rishi Dhawan 4/86 (31 overs)		206 (56.2 overs); Sumeet Verma 64 (59); Ashoke Dinda 5/61 (22 overs)
65/4 (15 overs); Wriddhiman Saha 34 (42); Rishi Dhawan 4/37 (8 overs)		353 (115 overs) (f/o); Priyanshu Khanduri 95 (238); Mohammed Shami 5/109 (31 overs)

Match drawn
Eden Gardens, Kolkata
Umpires: Sivasubramaniyan Shankar and Tapan Sharma
Player of the match: Abhishek Raman (Bengal)

- Himachal Pradesh won the toss and elected to field.
- Sidharth Sharma (Himachal Pradesh) made his first-class debut.
- Abhishek Raman (Bengal) scored his maiden first-class century.

1–4 November 2017
Scorecard

Vidarbha	v	Services
385 (124.5 overs); Faiz Fazal 136 (288); Nitin Tanwar 2/44 (18 overs)		317 (113 overs); Nakul Verma 71 (109); Akshay Wakhare 5/87 (36 overs)
223/6d (44 overs); Akshay Karnewar 48* (28); Vikas Yadav 2/39 (7 overs)		99 (28.1 overs); Rahul Singh 33 (35); Akshay Wakhare 5/16 (14 overs)

Vidarbha won by 192 runs
Vidarbha Cricket Association Ground, Nagpur
Umpires: Anil Dandekar and Jayaraman Madanagopal
Player of the match: Akshay Wakhare (Vidarbha)

- Vidarbha won the toss and elected to bat.

1–4 November 2017
Scorecard

Chhattisgarh	v	Punjab
238 (73 overs); Vishal Kushwah 76 (93); Manpreet Gony 4/41 (12 overs)		653/9d (128.1 overs); Anmolpreet Singh 267 (262); Shourabh Kharwar 3/107 (19 overs)
297 (102.4 overs); Ashutosh Singh 119 (222); Sandeep Sharma 4/89 (27 overs)

Punjab won by an innings and 118 runs
Shaheed Veer Narayan Singh International Cricket Stadium, Raipur
Umpires: Puttarangaiah Jayapal and Belur Ravi
Player of the match: Anmolpreet Singh (Punjab)

- Chhattisgarh won the toss and elected to bat.
- Siddharth Chandrakar and Shourabh Kharwar (Chhattisgarh) both made their first-class debuts.
- Anmolpreet Singh (Punjab) scored his maiden first-class double century.

=== Round 5 ===
9–12 November 2017
Scorecard

Vidarbha	v	Bengal
499 (138.1 overs); Sanjay Raghunath 182 (361); Ishan Porel 4/139 (47 overs)		207 (81 overs); Manoj Tiwary 50 (89); Akshay Wakhare 3/45 (18 overs)
18/0 (1.3 overs); Sanjay Raghunath 16* (6)		306 (101.4 overs) (f/o); Wriddhiman Saha 97 (116); Lalit Yadav 4/54 (22 overs)

Vidarbha won by 10 wickets
Bengal Cricket Academy Ground, Kalyani
Umpires: Nand Kishore and Martin Saggers
Player of the match: Sanjay Raghunath (Vidarbha)

- Bengal won the toss and elected to field.
- Ishan Porel (Bengal) made his first-class debut.
- Faiz Fazal and Sanjay Raghunath made the highest opening partnership for Vidarbha in the Ranji Trophy (259).

9–12 November 2017
Scorecard

Himachal Pradesh	v	Chhattisgarh
175 (44.2 overs); Rishi Dhawan 35 (48); Sumit Ruikar 3/20 (8 overs)		456 (135.2 overs); Rishabh Tiwari 131 (280); Pankaj Jaswal 3/85 (21.2 overs)
167 (49.5 overs); Nikhil Gangta 41 (65); Shahnawaz Hussain 6/53 (16 overs)

Chhattisgarh won by an innings and 114 runs
Himachal Pradesh Cricket Association Stadium, Dharamshala
Umpires: Jayaraman Madanagopal and Krishnamachari Srinivasan
Player of the match: Rishabh Tiwari (Chhattisgarh)

- Chhattisgarh won the toss and elected to field.
- Shahnawaz Hussain (Chhattisgarh) took his maiden five-wicket haul in first-class cricket.

9–12 November 2017
Scorecard

Services	v	Goa
263 (107.2 overs); Vikas Yadav 84 (180); Amogh Sunil Desai 3/18 (9.2 overs)		270 (118.5 overs); Keenan Vaz 70 (167); Sachidanand Pandey 5/61 (32.5 overs)
190 (55.4 overs); Ravi Chauhan 55 (111); Darshan Misal 7/68 (23.4 overs)		128/4 (50 overs); Sagun Kamat 57* (106); Diwesh Pathania 3/37 (15 overs)

Match drawn
Palam A Stadium, Delhi
Umpires: Anil Dandekar and Umesh Dubey
Player of the match: Vikas Yadav (Services)

- Goa won the toss and elected to field.
- Vikash Mohan (Services) and Heramb Parab (Goa) both made their first-class debuts.

=== Round 6 ===
17–20 November 2017
Scorecard

Chhattisgarh	v	Services
130 (72.2 overs); Manoj Singh 53 (117); Diwesh Pathania 4/45 (23.2 overs)		272 (90.5 overs); Vikas Hathwala 76 (84); Shahnawaz Hussain 5/59 (21.5 overs)
133 (55.3 overs); Abhimanyu Chauhan 43 (97); Diwesh Pathania 7/41 (20.3 overs)

Services won by an innings and 9 runs
Shaheed Veer Narayan Singh International Cricket Stadium, Raipur
Umpires: Belur Ravi and Krishnamachari Srinivasan
Player of the match: Diwesh Pathania (Services)

- Services won the toss and elected to field.

17–20 November 2017
Scorecard

Goa	v	Vidarbha
239 (93.4 overs); Keenan Vaz 72 (170); Akshay Wakhare 4/50 (25 overs)		427/3d (143 overs); Wasim Jaffer 158* (369); Amogh Sunil Desai 1/22 (9 overs)
151 (53.3 overs); Snehal Kauthankar 56 (101); Akshay Wakhare 5/54 (15 overs)

Vidarbha won by an innings and 37 runs
Goa Cricket Association Academy Ground, Porvorim
Umpires: Vineet Kulkarni and Pashchim Pathak
Player of the match: Akshay Wakhare (Vidarbha)

- Goa won the toss and elected to bat.
- Akshay Wadkar (Vidarbha) made his first-class debut.

17–20 November 2017
Scorecard

Punjab	v	Bengal
147 (46 overs); Shubman Gill 63 (102); Boddupalli Amit 3/31 (9 overs)		379/9d (116 overs); Abhishek Raman 155 (295); Siddarth Kaul 5/118 (32 overs)
213 (56.1 overs); Gurkeerat Singh 57 (53); Ishan Porel 5/32 (10.1 overs)

Bengal won by an innings and 19 runs
Gandhi Sports Complex Ground, Amritsar
Umpires: K. N. Ananthapadmanabhan and Stephen Harris
Player of the match: Abhishek Raman (Bengal)

- Punjab won the toss and elected to bat.
- Shubman Gill (Punjab) and Pradipta Pramanik (Bengal) both made their first-class debuts.

=== Round 7 ===
25–28 November 2017
Scorecard

Himachal Pradesh	v	Vidarbha
353 (107.3 overs); Akash Vasisht 69 (124); Rajneesh Gurbani 6/113 (33 overs)		456 (134.4 overs); Faiz Fazal 206 (307); Rishi Dhawan 4/96 (26.4 overs)
323/8d (96.1 overs); Nikhil Gangta 101* (260); Aditya Sarwate 6/75 (38.1 overs)

Match drawn
Vidarbha Cricket Association Stadium, Nagpur
Umpires: Umesh Dubey and Belur Ravi
Player of the match: Faiz Fazal (Himachal Pradesh)

- Vidarbha won the toss and elected to field.
- Shubham Kapse (Vidarbha) made his first-class debut.

25–28 November 2017
Scorecard

Bengal	v	Goa
379 (99.3 overs); Shreevats Goswami 139 (194); Lakshay Garg 4/89 (28 overs)		310 (105 overs); Amogh Sunil Desai 103 (264); Ashoke Dinda 5/79 (33 overs)
334/5d (80.5 overs); Anustup Majumdar 108* (183); Lakshay Garg 3/74 (25.5 overs)		86/2 (26 overs); Amogh Sunil Desai 22* (55); Ashoke Dinda 2/13 (5 overs)

Match drawn
Eden Gardens, Kolkata
Umpires: Sanjeev Dua and Nikhil Patwardhan

- Goa won the toss and elected to field.
- Lakshay Garg (Goa) made his first-class debut.

25–28 November 2017
Scorecard

Punjab	v	Services
645/6d (138 overs); Anmolpreet Singh 252* (318); Ravi Chauhan 1/19 (2 overs)		315 (71.2 overs); Vikas Yadav 71 (97); Manpreet Gony 5/63 (15 overs)
94/5 (6.1 overs); Shubman Gill 32 (16); Sachidanand Pandey 3/26 (2 overs)		458 (105) (f/o); Rahul Singh 124 (168); Siddarth Kaul 3/96 (24 overs)

Match drawn
Gandhi Sports Complex Ground, Amritsar
Umpires: Vineet Kulkarni and Krishnaraj Srinath
Player of the match: Anmolpreet Singh (Punjab)

- Services won the toss and elected to field.
- Shubman Gill (Punjab) scored his maiden first-class century.
