= 2017–18 Irani Cup =

Vidarbha	Rest of India
800/7 & 79/0	390
- Match drawn; Vidarbha won on 1st innings
- Date: 14 March 2018 – 18 March 2018
- Venue: Vidarbha Cricket Association Stadium, Nagpur
- Player of the match: Wasim Jaffer (Vidarbha)
- Umpires: C. K. Nandan and Anil Chaudhary

The 2017–18 Irani Cup was the 56th season of Irani Cup, a first-class cricket competition in India. It was played as a one-off match between Vidarbha (the winner of the 2017–18 Ranji trophy) and Rest of India cricket team. The match was played from 14 March 2018 to 18 March 2018 at the Vidarbha Cricket Association Stadium, Nagpur.

== Squads ==
Vidarbha	Rest of India
Faiz Fazal (c)	Karun Nair (c)
Ganesh Satish	Prithvi Shaw
Rajneesh Gurbani	Abhimanyu Easwaran
Wasim Jaffer	Ravikumar Samarth
Akshay Karnewar	Mayank Agarwal
Lalit Yadav	Hanuma Vihari
Siddhesh Neral	K. S. Bharat (wk)
Sanjay Ramaswamy	~~Ravindra Jadeja~~
Aditya Sarwate	Jayant Yadav
Karn Sharma	Shahbaz Nadeem
Shalabh Shrivastava	Anmolpreet Singh
Aditya Thakare	Siddarth Kaul
Akshay Wadkar (wk)	Ankit Rajpoot
Akshay Wakhare	Navdeep Saini
Apoorv Wankhade	Atit Sheth
Siddhesh Wath (wk)	Ravichandran Ashwin
Umesh Yadav

Ravindra Jadeja was ruled out of Rest of India's squad before the start of the tournament. He was replaced by Ravichandran Ashwin

== Match ==
14–18 March
Scorecard

Vidarbha	v	Rest of India
800/7d (226.3 overs); Wasim Jaffer 286 (431); Siddarth Kaul 2/91 (36 overs)		390 (129.1 overs); Hanuma Vihari 183 (327); Rajneesh Gurbani 4/70 (24 overs)
79/0 (26 overs); Akshay Wadkar 50* (71)

Match drawn; Vidarbha won on 1st innings
Vidarbha Cricket Association Stadium, Nagpur
Umpires: C. K. Nandan and Anil Chaudhary
Player of the match: Wasim Jaffer (Vidarbha)

- Vidarbha won the toss and elected to bat.
- This was Vidarbha's maiden Irani Trophy.
