= Australia A and South Africa A cricket team in India in 2018 =

In July and August 2018, South Africa A cricket team visited India to play two first-class matches against India A. India A won the two-match series 1–0. They were joined by India B and Australia A for a List A Quadrangular Series in August. India B beat Australia A in the final to win the series. After the quadrangular series, Australia A played two first-class matches against India A. The two-match series was drawn 1–1.

== India A vs South Africa A first-class series ==
South Africa A cricket team in India in 2018
	India A	South Africa
- Dates: 30 July – 13 August 2018
Captains	Shreyas Iyer	Khaya Zondo

FC series
- Result: India A won the 2-match series 1–0
Most runs	Mayank Agarwal (248)	Rudi Second (235)
Most wickets	Mohammed Siraj (14)	Duanne Olivier (10)

=== Squads ===
India A	South Africa A	(India) Board President's XI
Shreyas Iyer (c); Prithvi Shaw; Ravikumar Samarth; Mayank Agarwal; Abhimanyu Easwaran; Hanuma Vihari; Ankit Bawne; Srikar Bharat; Axar Patel; Shahbaz Nadeem; Yuzvendra Chahal; Jayant Yadav; Rajneesh Gurbani; Navdeep Saini; Ankit Rajpoot; Mohammed Siraj	Khaya Zondo (c); Sarel Erwee; Zubayr Hamza; Beuran Hendricks; Pieter Malan; Senuran Muthusamy; Mthiwekhaya Nabe; Anrich Nortje; Duanne Olivier; Dane Piedt; Dwaine Pretorius; Rudi Second; Rassie van der Dussen; Malusi Siboto; Shaun von Berg	Ishan Kishan (c); Sanjay Ramaswamy; Abhimanyu Easwaran; Dhruv Shorey; Anmolpreet Singh; Ricky Bhui; Jalaj Saxena; Siddhesh Lad; Mihir Hirwani; Dharmendrasinh Jadeja; Avesh Khan; Shivam Mavi; Ishan Porel; Atit Sheth

=== Three-day warm-up match: Indian Board's President's XI vs South Africa A ===
30 July – 1 August 2018
Scorecard

South Africa A	v	(India) Board President's XI
473/4d (115.1 overs); Sarel Erwee 117 (137); Jalaj Saxena 2/54 (16.1 overs)		397/6d (108 overs); Dhruv Shorey 101 (162); Shaun von Berg 3/62 (17 overs)
61/2 (15.5 overs); Dwaine Pretorius 27* (35); Mihir Hirwani 2/35 (8.3 overs)

Match drawn
M. Chinnaswamy Stadium, Bengaluru
Umpires: Sadashiv Iyer (Ind) and Nitin Pandit (Ind)

=== 1st unofficial Test ===
4–7 August 2018
Scorecard

South Africa A	v	India A
246 (88.3 overs); Rudi Second 94 (139); Mohammed Siraj 5/56 (20.3 overs)		584/8d (129.4 overs); Mayank Agarwal 220 (251); Beuran Hendricks 3/98 (22.4 overs)
308 (128.5 overs); Rudi Second 94 (214); Mohammed Siraj 5/73 (27.5 overs)

India A won by an innings and 30 runs
M. Chinnaswamy Stadium, Bengaluru
Umpires: Anil Dandekar (Ind) and Ulhas Gandhe (Ind)

- South Africa A won the toss and elected to bat.

=== 2nd unofficial Test ===
10–13 August 2018
Scorecard

India A	v	South Africa A
345 (101 overs); Hanuma Vihari 148 (295); Duanne Olivier 6/63 (24 overs)		319 (98.2 overs); Zubayr Hamza 93 (125); Mohammed Siraj 4/72 (21.2 overs)
181/4 (51 overs); Shreyas Iyer 65 (103); Duanne Olivier 2/24 (10 overs)

Match drawn
KSCA Alur Cricket Ground, Bengaluru
Umpires: Yeshwant Barde (Ind) and Vineet Kulkarni (Ind)

- South Africa A won the toss and elected to field.
- India won the first-class series 1–0.

== Quadrangular Series ==
2018 A team Quadrangular Series, India
- Dates: 17 – 29 August 2018
- Administrator: BCCI
- Cricket format: List-A
- Host: India
- Champions: India B
- Runners-up: Australia A
- Participants: 4
- Matches: 12
- Most runs: Manish Pandey (306) (India B)
- Most wickets: Shreyas Gopal (9) (India B)
- Official website: BCCI

The quadrangular series was initially scheduled to be held at Vijayawada but was forced to move out due to the incessant rains after the first four games of the series were washed out without a ball bowled. The venue was shifted to Bengaluru.

=== Squads ===
India A	India B	Australia A	South Africa A
Shreyas Iyer (c); ~~Prithvi Shaw~~; Ravikumar Samarth; Suryakumar Yadav; ~~Hanuma Vihari~~; Nitish Rana; ~~Siddhesh Lad~~; Sanju Samson; Mayank Markande; Krishnappa Gowtham; Krunal Pandya; Deepak Chahar; Mohammed Siraj; Shivam Mavi; Khaleel Ahmed; Ambati Rayudu; Bhuvneshwar Kumar	Manish Pandey (c); Mayank Agarwal; Abhimanyu Easwaran; Shubman Gill; Deepak Hooda; ~~Ricky Bhui~~; ~~Vijay Shankar~~; Ishan Kishan; Shreyas Gopal; ~~Jayant Yadav~~; Dharmendrasinh Jadeja; Siddarth Kaul; Prasidh Krishna; Kulwant Khejroliya; Navdeep Saini; Kedar Jadhav; Jalaj Saxena	Travis Head (c); Alex Carey; Ashton Agar; Peter Handscomb; Usman Khawaja; Marnus Labuschagne; Michael Neser; Matt Renshaw; Jhye Richardson; D'Arcy Short; Billy Stanlake; Mitchell Swepson; Chris Tremain; Jack Wildermuth	Khaya Zondo (c); Temba Bavuma; Farhaan Behardien; Gihahn Cloete; Theunis de Bruyn; Robert Frylinck; Beuran Hendricks; Sisanda Magala; Pieter Malan; Senuran Muthusamy; Dane Paterson; Rudi Second; Dwaine Pretorius; Tabraiz Shamsi; Malusi Siboto

Vijay Shankar was ruled out of the quadrangular series due to the left hamstring injury. On August 22, Ambati Rayudu and Kedar Jadhav were added to the India A and India B squads respectively while Siddhesh Lad and Ricky Bhui were released from the squads for the Duleep Trophy. Hanuma Vihari and Prithvi Shaw from India A were added to the India squad for the ongoing England tour. On August 25, Jayant Yadav was diagnosed with a right side strain and was ruled out of the tournament with Jalaj Saxena being named as his replacement for India B. On August 27, Bhuvneshwar Kumar has been added to the India-A squad to play in the third-place play-off against South Africa A.

=== Points table ===
Team	P	W	L	T	NR	NRR	Pts
India B	5	2	1	0	2	+0.599	12
Australia A	5	2	1	0	2	−0.204	12
South Africa A	5	1	2	0	2	+0.006	9
India A	5	1	2	0	2	−0.300	9

Top two teams advanced to the final

=== Matches ===
==== 1st Match ====
17 August 2018
09:00
Scorecard

India A	v	Australia A

Match abandoned without a ball bowled
ACA–KDCA Cricket Ground, Mulapadu, Krishna
Umpires: Krishnamachari Srinivasan and K. N. Ananthapadmanabhan

- No toss.

==== 2nd Match ====
17 August 2018
09:00
Scorecard

India B	v	South Africa A

Match abandoned without a ball bowled
Dr. Gokaraju Liala Gangaaraju ACA Cricket Ground, Vijayawada
Umpires: Virender Sharma and Rohan Pandit

- No toss.

==== 3rd Match ====
19 August 2018
09:00
Scorecard

India A	v	India B

Match abandoned without a ball bowled
ACA–KDCA Cricket Ground, Mulapadu, Krishna
Umpires: Virender Sharma and Yeshwant Barde

- No toss.

==== 4th Match ====
19 August 2018
09:00
Scorecard

Australia A	v	South Africa A

Match abandoned without a ball bowled
Dr. Gokaraju Liala Gangaaraju ACA Cricket Ground, Vijayawada
Umpires: Krishnamachari Srinivasan and K. N. Ananthapadmanabhan

- No toss.

==== 5th Match ====
23 August 2018
09:00
Scorecard

Australia A 151 (31.4 overs)	v	India A 152/5 (38.3 overs)
Ashton Agar 34 (40); Mohammed Siraj 4/68 (10 overs)		Ambati Rayudu 62* (107); Jhye Richardson 3/27 (7 overs)

India A won by 5 wickets
M. Chinnaswamy Stadium, Bengaluru
Umpires: Yeshwant Barde (Ind) and Krishnamachari Srinivasan (Ind)
Player of the match: Ambati Rayudu (Ind-A)

- Australia A won the toss and elected to bat.
- Points: India A 5, Australia A 0.

==== 6th Match ====
23 August 2018
09:00
Scorecard

South Africa A 231 (47.3 overs)	v	India B 214/5 (40.3 overs)
Senuran Muthusamy 55 (73); Prasidh Krishna 4/49 (7.3 overs)		Manish Pandey 95* (105); Dane Paterson 2/33 (8 overs)

India B won by 30 runs (DLS method)
KSCA Cricket Ground, Alur, Bengaluru
Umpires: K. N. Ananthapadmanabhan (Ind) and Rohan Pandit (Ind)
Player of the match: Manish Pandey (Ind-B)

- India B won the toss and elected to field.
- Rain interrupted the India B innings at 29.1 overs with score at 149/4 and at resumption the target was set at 220 in 45 overs.
- Rain again interrupted the innings at 40.3 overs with score at 214/5 and match could not be resumed.
- Points: India B 4, South Africa A 0.

==== 7th Match ====
25 August 2018
09:00
Scorecard

India A 217 (49 overs)	v	India B 218/3 (41.1 overs)
Ambati Rayudu 48 (75); Prasidh Krishna 4/50 (8 overs)		Mayank Agarwal 124 (114); Khaleel Ahmed 2/33 (10 overs)

India B won by 7 wickets
KSCA Cricket Ground, Alur, Bengaluru
Umpires: Yeshwant Barde (Ind) and Virender Sharma (Ind)
Player of the match: Mayank Agarwal (Ind-B)

- India A won the toss and elected to bat first.
- Points: India B 4, India A 0.

==== 8th Match ====
25 August 2018
09:00
Scorecard

Australia A 322/5 (50 overs)	v	South Africa A 290 (48.4 overs)
Travis Head 110 (117); Shaun von Berg 1/41 (7 overs)		Khaya Zondo 117 (104); Mitchell Swepson 3/40 (10 overs)

Australia A won by 32 runs
M. Chinnaswamy Stadium, Bengaluru
Umpires: Rohan Pandit (Ind) and KN Ananthapadmanabhan (Ind)
Player of the match: Travis Head (Aus-A)

- Australia A won the toss and elected to bat first.
- Points: Australia A 4, South Africa A 0.

==== 9th Match ====
27 August 2018
09:00
Scorecard

India A 157 (37.3 overs)	v	South Africa A 159/6 (37.4 overs)
Deepak Chahar 38 (42); Dane Paterson 5/19 (9.3 overs)		Pieter Malan 47 (86); Khaleel Ahmed 3/45 (7 overs)

South Africa A won by 4 wickets
M. Chinnaswamy Stadium, Bengaluru
Umpires: Rohan Pandit (Ind) and Yeshwant Barde (Ind)
Player of the match: Dane Paterson (SA-A)

- South Africa A won the toss and elected to field.
- Points: South Africa A 5, India A 0.

==== 10th Match ====
27 August 2018
09:00
Scorecard

India B 276/6 (50 overs)	v	Australia A 248/5 (40 overs)
Manish Pandey 117* (109); Michael Neser 3/47 (9 overs)		Usman Khawaja 101* (93); Jalaj Saxena 2/48 (8 overs)

Australia A won by 5 wickets (DLS method)
KSCA Cricket Ground, Alur, Bengaluru
Umpires: Virender Sharma (Ind) and Krishnamachari Srinivasan (Ind)
Player of the match: Usman Khawaja (Aus-A)

- Australia A won the toss and elected to field.
- Rain interrupted Australia A innings at 24.1 overs with score at 132/4 and at resumption the target was set at 247 in 40 overs.
- Points: Australia A 4, India B 0.

==== Third place play-off ====
29 August 2018
09:00
Scorecard

India A 275/7 (50 overs)	v	South Africa A 151 (37.1 overs)
Shreyas Iyer 67 (70); Beuran Hendricks 3/39 (10 overs)		Senuran Muthusamy 40 (51); Bhuvneshwar Kumar 3/33 (9 overs)

India A won by 124 runs
KSCA Cricket Ground, Alur, Bengaluru
Umpires: Virender Sharma (Ind) and Rohan Pandit (Ind)
Player of the match: Shreyas Iyer (Ind-A)

- South Africa A won the toss and elected to field.

==== Final ====
29 August 2018
09:00
Scorecard

Australia A 225 (47.5 overs)	v	India B 230/1 (36.3 overs)
D'Arcy Short 72 (77); Shreyas Gopal 3/50 (10 overs)		Manish Pandey 73* (54); Ashton Agar 1/59 (10 overs)

India B won by 9 wickets
M. Chinnaswamy Stadium, Bengaluru
Umpires: KN Ananthapadmanabhan (Ind) and Krishnamachari Srinivasan (Ind)
Player of the match: Manish Pandey (Ind-B)

- India B won the toss and elected to field.

== India A vs Australia A first-class series ==
Australia A cricket team in India in 2018
	India A	Australia A
- Dates: 2 – 11 September 2018
Captains	Shreyas Iyer	Mitchell Marsh

FC series
- Result: 2-match series drawn 1–1
Most runs	Ankit Bawne (157)	Travis Head (206)
Most wickets	Kuldeep Yadav (12)	Jon Holland (9)

The first-class series was initially scheduled to be held at Vijayawada but was forced to move to Bengaluru due to depression in Bay of Bengal, which had resulted in heavy showers in Andhra Pradesh.

=== Squads ===
India A	Australia A
Shreyas Iyer (c); Mayank Agarwal; Ravikumar Samarth; Abhimanyu Easwaran; Ankit Bawne; Shubman Gill; Srikar Bharat; Shahbaz Nadeem; Kuldeep Yadav; Krishnappa Gowtham; Rajneesh Gurbani; Navdeep Saini; Ankit Rajpoot; Mohammed Siraj	Mitchell Marsh (c); Alex Carey; Ashton Agar; Brendan Doggett; Peter Handscomb; Travis Head; Jon Holland; Usman Khawaja; Michael Neser; Joel Paris; Kurtis Patterson; Matt Renshaw; Mitchell Swepson; Chris Tremain

=== 1st unofficial Test ===
2–5 September 2018
Scorecard

Australia A	v	India A
243 (75.3 overs); Usman Khawaja 127 (228); Mohammed Siraj 8/59 (19.3 overs)		274 (83.1 overs); Ankit Bawne 91* (159); Michael Neser 4/61 (20 overs)
292 (83.5 overs); Travis Head 87 (162); Mohammed Siraj 3/77 (18 overs)		163 (59.3 overs); Mayank Agarwal 80 (189); Jon Holland 6/81 (24.3 overs)

Australia A won by 98 runs
M. Chinnaswamy Stadium, Bengaluru
Umpires: Virender Sharma and CK Nandan

- Australia A won the toss and elected to bat.

=== 2nd unofficial Test ===
8–11 September 2018
Scorecard

Australia A	v	India A
346 (109 overs); Mitchell Marsh 113* (204); Kuldeep Yadav 5/91 (27 overs)		505 (144 overs); Srikar Bharat 106 (186); Chris Tremain 3/41 (17 overs)
213 (102.5 overs); Peter Handscomb 56 (153); Krishnappa Gowtham 3/39 (27 overs)		55/4 (6.2 overs); Ankit Bawne 28* (18); Chris Tremain 2/26 (3 overs)

India A won by 6 wickets
KSCA Cricket Ground, Alur, Bengaluru
Umpires: Saiyed Khalid (Ind) and Abhijit Deshmukh (Ind)

- Australia A won the toss and elected to bat.

== Statistics ==
=== Most runs ===
India A vs South Africa A first-class series
Player	Team	Mat	Inns	Runs	Ave	SR	HS	100	50
Mayank Agarwal	India A	2	3	248	82.66	83.5	220	1	0
Rudi Second	South Africa A	2	3	235	78.33	50.97	94	0	2
Hanuma Vihari	India A	2	3	202	67.33	49.38	148	1	1
Source: ESPNcricinfo

Quadrangular Series
Player	Team	Mat	Inns	Runs	Ave	SR	HS	100	50
Manish Pandey	India B	4	4	306	—	100.99	117*	1	2
Mayank Agarwal	India B	4	4	236	59	96.72	124	1	1
Ambati Rayudu	India A	4	4	187	62.33	64.93	66	0	2
Source: ESPNcricinfo

India A vs Australia A first-class series
Player	Team	Mat	Inns	Runs	Ave	SR	HS	100	50
Travis Head	Australia A	2	4	206	51.50	48.13	87	0	2
Usman Khawaja	Australia A	1	2	167	83.50	52.68	127	1	0
Mitchell Marsh	Australia A	2	4	158	52.66	49.37	113*	1	1
Source: ESPNcricinfo

=== Most wickets ===
India A vs South Africa A first-class series
Player	Team	Mat	Inns	Wkts	Ave	Econ	SR	BBI	BBM	5	10
Mohammed Siraj	India A	2	3	14	14.35	2.88	29.8	5/56	10/129	2	1
Duanne Olivier	South Africa A	2	3	10	17.5	2.91	36	6/63	8/87	1	0
Rajneesh Gurbani	India A	1	2	4	23	3.06	45	2/45	4/92	0	0
Source: ESPNcricinfo

Quadrangular Series
Player	Team	Mat	Inns	Wkts	Ave	Econ	SR	BBI	4	5
Shreyas Gopal	India B	4	4	9	17.66	4.54	23.3	3/42	0	0
Prasidh Krishna	India B	4	4	8	21.5	7.02	18.3	4/49	2	0
Dane Paterson	South Africa A	2	2	7	7.42	2.97	15	5/19	0	1
Source: ESPNcricinfo

India A vs Australia A first-class series
Player	Team	Mat	Inns	Wkts	Ave	Econ	SR	BBI	BBM	5	10
Kuldeep Yadav	India A	2	4	12	20.91	2.89	4.3	5/91	8/137	1	0
Mohammed Siraj	India A	1	2	11	12.36	3.62	20.4	8/59	11/136	1	1
Jon Holland	Australia A	1	2	9	18.88	3.16	35.7	6/81	9/170	1	0
Source: ESPNcricinfo
