= 2018–19 Irani Cup =

Rest of India	Vidarbha
330 & 374/3	425 & 269/5
89.4 & 107	142.1 & 103.1
- Match drawn; Vidarbha won on 1st innings
- Date: 12–16 February 2019
- Venue: Vidarbha Cricket Association Stadium, Nagpur
- Player of the match: Akshay Karnewar (Vidarbha)
- Umpires: Nitin Menon and C. K. Nandan

The 2018–19 Irani Cup is the 57th season of Irani Cup, a first-class cricket competition in India. It was played as a one-off match between the Vidarbha (the winner of the 2018–19 Ranji Trophy) and Rest of India cricket team, from 12 February 2019 to 16 February 2019. In April 2018, ESPNcricinfo had reported that Irani Cup was proposed to be no more part of the domestic season but it was included in the final schedule released by BCCI in July. Vidarbha successfully defended their title and defeated Rest of India on first-innings basis to win the tournament. Vidarbha became the third team after Bombay and Karnataka to defend both the Ranji Trophy and Irani Cup. Hanuma Vihari became the first player to score 3 consecutive centuries in Irani Cup.

== Squads ==
Vidarbha	Rest of India
Playing XI
Faiz Fazal (c)	Ajinkya Rahane (c)
Sanjay Ramaswamy	Mayank Agarwal
Ganesh Satish	Anmolpreet Singh
Atharwa Taide	Hanuma Vihari
Mohit Kale	Shreyas Iyer
Akshay Wadkar (wk)	Ishan Kishan (wk)
Aditya Sarwate	Krishnappa Gowtham
Akshay Karnewar	Dharmendrasinh Jadeja
Akshay Wakhare	Rahul Chahar
Yash Thakur	Ankit Rajpoot
Rajneesh Gurbani	Tanvir Mashart Ul-Haq
Reserve Bench
Wasim Jaffer	Ronit More
Shrikant Wagh	Sandeep Warrier
Lalit Yadav	Rinku Singh
Aditya Thakare	Snell Patel
~~Umesh Yadav~~	
Darshan Nalkande	

Umesh Yadav had a niggle and was replaced by Darshan Nalkande.

== Match ==
12–16 February 2019
Scorecard

Rest of India	v	Vidarbha
330 (89.4 overs); Hanuma Vihari 114 (211); Akshay Wakhare 3/62 (14.4 overs)		425 (142.1 overs); Akshay Karnewar 102 (133); Rahul Chahar 4/112 (40 overs)
374/3d (107 overs); Hanuma Vihari 180* (300); Aditya Sarwate 2/141 (39 overs)		269/5 (103.1 overs); Ganesh Satish 87 (168); Rahul Chahar 2/116 (41 overs)

Match drawn (Vidarbha won on 1st innings)
Vidarbha Cricket Association Stadium, Nagpur
Umpires: Nitin Menon and C. K. Nandan
Player of the match: Akshay Karnewar (Vid)

- Rest of India won the toss and elected to bat.
