= Chandrakar =

- Pronunciation: Chandrākar
- Language: Hindi, Chhattisgarhi

Origin
- Origin: Sanskrit (Chandra meaning Moon)
- Region of origin: India (mostly Chhattisgarh)

Chandrakar is a surname, commonly used in India. Notable people with the surname include:

- Ajay Chandrakar (born 1963), Indian politician
- Chandulal Chandrakar (1920–1995), Indian journalist and politician
- Lalit Chandrakar (born 1974), Indian politician
- Mamta Chandrakar (born 1958), Indian folk singer
- Mukesh Chandrakar (1993–2025), Indian journalist
- Pratima Chandrakar, Indian politician
- Shashank Chandrakar (born 1994), Indian cricketer
- Siddharth Chandrakar (born 1993), Indian cricketer

== Geographic Distribution ==
The surname Chandrakar is predominantly found in the Indian state of Chhattisgarh, especially in districts such as Raipur, Durg, Dhamtari, and Mahasamund. It is less common outside India but may be found within Indian diaspora communities in countries like the United States, United Kingdom, and the United Arab Emirates.
