= Navneet =

- Pronunciation: नवनीत
- Gender: Unisex

Origin
- Origin: नवनीत
- Meaning: Kṛṣṇa, Fresh Butter, Ever New
- Region of origin: India

Other names
- Alternative spelling: नवनीत
- Nicknames: Navi, Nav, Neetu, Vanu

Navneet is a unisex given name in India, derived from the Sanskrit word "नवनीत", meaning "eternally new".

The name Navneet is mentioned in the Mahabharata as a name of Kṛṣṇa.

== Notable people ==
- Navneet Aditya Waiba, Indian singer
- Navneet Dhaliwal (born 1988), Canadian cricketer
- Navneet Kaur (disambiguation), multiple people
- Navneet Lal, Indian politician
- Navneet Nishan, Indian actress
- Navneet Singh (disambiguation), multiple people
- Navneet Virk (born 1996), Indian cricketer
