= 2018–19 Duleep Trophy =

Cricket tournament

- Dates: 17 August – 9 September 2018
- Administrator: BCCI
- Cricket format: First-class cricket
- Tournament format(s): Round-robin and Finals
- Champions: India Blue (2nd title)
- Participants: 3
- Matches: 4
- Most runs: Dhruv Shorey (293)
- Most wickets: Saurabh Kumar (19)

The 2018–19 Duleep Trophy was the 57th season of the Duleep Trophy, a first-class cricket tournament in India, which took place in August and September 2018. India Red were the defending champions. All of the matches took place at the NPR College Ground in Dindigul. The BCCI's technical committee structured the tournament to have four teams from four Ranji Trophy Groups, similar to the 2002–03 Duleep Trophy, but on the day of team selections, the format of the previous season was retained.

All three round-robin matches finished as draws. The first match, India Red took three points, as a result of a first-innings lead, with India Green getting one point. The second match, India Red had a first-innings lead over India Blue, therefore gaining three points, and advancing to the final. In the third and final match, India Blue finished with a first-innings lead against India Green, and advanced to the final.

India Blue won the tournament, beating India Red by an innings and 187 runs in the final.

== Squads ==
India Blue	India Red	India Green
Faiz Fazal (c); Abhishek Raman; Anmolpreet Singh; Ganesh Satish; Nikhil Gangta; Dhruv Shorey; K. S. Bharat (wk); Akshay Wakhare; Saurabh Kumar; Swapnil Singh; Basil Thampi; Bandaru Ayyappa; Jaydev Unadkat; Dhawal Kulkarni; Ricky Bhui	Abhinav Mukund (c); Sanjay Raghunath; Ashutosh Singh; Baba Aparajith; Writtick Chatterjee; Bavanaka Sandeep; ~~Abhishek Gupta (wk)~~; Shahbaz Nadeem; Mihir Hirwani; Parvez Rasool; Rajneesh Gurbani; Abhimanyu Mithun; Ishan Porel; Prithvi Raj; Akshay Wadkar (wk); Siddhesh Lad	Parthiv Patel (c, wk); Prashant Chopra; Priyank Panchal; Sudip Chatterjee; Gurkeerat Singh; Baba Indrajith; Vishnu Solanki; Jalaj Saxena; Karn Sharma; Vikas Mishra; Krishnamoorthy Vignesh; Ankit Rajpoot; Ashok Dinda; Atit Sheth

Akshay Wadkar replaced Abhishek Gupta in India Red's squad, as Gupta's doping ban was going to expire after the start of the Duleep Trophy. On 22 August, Siddhesh Lad and Ricky Bhui were released from their Quadrangular Series squads and added to the India Red and Blue teams respectively.

== Points table ==
Team	Pld	W	L	D	A	Pts
India Red	2	0	0	2	0	6
India Blue	2	0	0	2	0	4
India Green	2	0	0	2	0	2

- Top two teams advance to the Final.

== Fixtures ==
=== Round-robin ===
17–20 August 2018 (D/N)
Scorecard

India Red	v	India Green
337 (132.5 overs); Ashutosh Singh 80 (256); Ankit Rajpoot 4/57 (29 overs)		309 (111.3 overs); Baba Indrajith 109 (228); Rajneesh Gurbani 7/81 (27 overs)
261/1d (79 overs); Sanjay Raghunath 123* (245); Ankit Rajpoot 1/40 (11 overs)

Match drawn
NPR College Ground, Dindigul
Umpires: Anil Chaudhary and Anil Dandekar
Player of the match: Rajneesh Gurbani (India Red)

- India Red won the toss and elected to bat.
- Points: India Red 3, India Green 1.

23–26 August 2018 (D/N)
Scorecard

India Red	v	India Blue
316 (114.5 overs); Siddhesh Lad 88 (142); Saurabh Kumar 3/75 (33.5 overs)		293 (95.3 overs); Dhruv Shorey 97 (188); Parvez Rasool 4/107 (36 overs)
255 (84.3 overs); Siddhesh Lad 68 (152); Saurabh Kumar 4/79 (34 overs)		128/8 (47 overs); Dhruv Shorey 45 (102); Shahbaz Nadeem 5/53 (23 overs)

Match drawn
NPR College Ground, Dindigul
Umpires: Abhijit Deshmukh and C. K. Nandan
Player of the match: Siddhesh Lad (India Red)

- India Red won the toss and elected to bat.
- Points: India Red 3, India Blue 1.

29 August–1 September 2018 (D/N)
Scorecard

India Blue	v	India Green
340 (119.1 overs); Dhruv Shorey 93 (215); Krishnamoorthy Vignesh 5/50 (25.1 overs)		257 (88.5 overs); Prashant Chopra 80 (194); Saurabh Kumar 5/98 (27 overs)
117 (34 overs); Dhruv Shorey 40 (50); Aditya Sarwate 5/32 (13 overs)		20/2 (6.4 overs); Sudip Chatterjee 11* (13); Saurabh Kumar 2/11 (3.4 overs)

Match drawn
NPR College Ground, Dindigul
Umpires: Ulhas Gandhe and Vineet Kulkarni
Player of the match: Dhruv Shorey (India Blue)

- India Blue won the toss and elected to bat.
- Points: India Blue 3, India Green 1.

=== Final ===
4–8 September 2018 (D/N)
Scorecard

India Blue	v	India Red
541 (167.3 overs); Nikhil Gangta 130 (241); Parvez Rasool 4/150 (53.3 overs)		182 (69.1 overs); Bavanaka Sandeep 57 (112); Swapnil Singh 5/58 (22 overs)
		172 (38.4 overs) (f/o); Abhinav Mukund 46 (55); Saurabh Kumar 5/51 (13 overs)

India Blue won by an innings and 187 runs
NPR College Ground, Dindigul
Umpires: Chettithody Shamshuddin and Nitin Menon
Player of the match: Nikhil Gangta (India Blue)

- India Blue won the toss and elected to bat.
