= Saurabh Kumar (cricketer) =

Indian cricketer (born 1993)

Personal information
- Born: 1 May 1993 (age 33); Baghpat, Uttar Pradesh, India
- Batting: Left-handed
- Bowling: Slow left-arm orthodox
- Role: All-rounder

Domestic team information
- Years: Team
- 2014/15: Services
- 2015/16–present: Uttar Pradesh
- Source: Cricinfo, 19 February 2022

Saurabh Kumar (born 1 May 1993) is an Indian cricketer who plays for Uttar Pradesh.

== Career ==
He made his Twenty20 debut on 8 January 2016 in the 2015–16 Syed Mushtaq Ali Trophy. He was the leading wicket-taker for Uttar Pradesh in the 2017–18 Ranji Trophy, with 23 dismissals in four matches.

In February 2017, he was bought by the Rising Pune Supergiants team for the 2017 Indian Premier League for 10 lakhs. In July 2018, he was named in the squad for India Blue for the 2018–19 Duleep Trophy. He was the leading wicket-taker in the tournament, with nineteen dismissals in three matches.

In December 2018, in the 2018–19 Ranji Trophy match against Haryana, Kumar took fourteen wickets for 65 runs in the match. These were the second-best match figures for a bowler for Uttar Pradesh in the Ranji Trophy. He was the leading wicket-taker for Uttar Pradesh in the group-stage of the 2018–19 Ranji Trophy, with 50 dismissals in nine matches. He finished the tournament with 51 wickets in ten matches. In August 2019, he was named in the India Blue team's squad for the 2019–20 Duleep Trophy.

In January 2021, he was named as one of five net bowlers in India's Test squad for their series against England. In February 2021, Kumar was bought by the Punjab Kings in the IPL auction ahead of the 2021 Indian Premier League. In February 2022, he was again named in India's Test squad, this time for their series against Sri Lanka.
