= Abhishek Gupta =

Abhishek Gupta can refer to:

- Abhishek Gupta (television personality) (born 1978), Indian television personality
- Abhishek Gupta (cricketer) (born 1990), Indian cricketer
