= Vikas Yadav =

Vikas Yadav may refer to:

- Vikas Yadav (Indian Intelligence Offer)
- Vikas Yadav (cricketer)
