= 2019–20 Deodhar Trophy =

Cricket tournament

- Dates: 31 October – 4 November 2019
- Administrator: BCCI
- Cricket format: List A cricket
- Tournament format(s): Double round robin and Knockout
- Host(s): Ranchi, India
- Champions: India B (2nd title)
- Participants: 3
- Matches: 4
- Most runs: Baba Aparajith (167) (Ind-B)
- Most wickets: Jalaj Saxena (10) (Ind-C)

The 2019–20 Deodhar Trophy was the 47th edition of the Deodhar Trophy, a List A cricket competition in India. It was contested between three teams selected by the Board of Control for Cricket in India (BCCI). It took place in October and November 2019, after the Duleep Trophy and before the Ranji Trophy. India C were the defending champions.

India A lost both of their matches, therefore India B and India C progressed to the final. India B beat India C by 51 runs in the final to win the tournament.

== Squads ==
India A	India B	India C
Hanuma Vihari (c); Devdutt Padikkal; Abhimanyu Easwaran; Vishnu Vinod; Amandeep Khare; Abhishek Raman; Ishan Kishan (wk); Shahbaz Ahmed; Ravi Bishnoi; Ravichandran Ashwin; Jaydev Unadkat; Sandeep Warrier; Siddarth Kaul; Bhargav Merai; Prithvi Raj	Parthiv Patel (c, wk); Priyank Panchal; Yashasvi Jaiswal; Baba Aparajith; Kedar Jadhav; Ruturaj Gaikwad; Shahbaz Nadeem; Anukul Roy; Krishnappa Gowtham; Vijay Shankar; Mohammed Siraj; Roosh Kalaria; Nitish Rana	Shubman Gill (c); Mayank Agarwal; Anmolpreet Singh; Suryakumar Yadav; Priyam Garg; Dinesh Karthik (wk); Axar Patel; Mayank Markande; Jalaj Saxena; Avesh Khan; Dhawal Kulkarni; Ishan Porel; Diwesh Pathania; Virat Singh

Prithvi Raj was initially named in India B's squad, but moved to India A, following an injury to Sandeep Warrier.

== Group stage ==
=== Points table ===
Team	Pld	W	L	Tie	N/R	Pts	NRR
India C	2	2	0	0	0	8	+3.680
India B	2	1	1	0	0	4	–0.280
India A	2	0	2	0	0	0	–3.400

=== Matches ===
31 October 2019
09:00
Scorecard

India B 302/6 (50 overs)	v	India A 194 (47.2 overs)
Ruturaj Gaikwad 113 (122); Ravichandran Ashwin 2/40 (10 overs)		Hanuma Vihari 59 (82); Roosh Kalaria 3/20 (8.2 overs)

India B won by 108 runs
JSCA International Stadium Complex, Ranchi
Umpires: Virender Sharma and Krishnamachari Srinivasan

- India A won the toss and elected to field.

1 November 2019
09:00
Scorecard

India C 366/3 (50 overs)	v	India A 134 (29.5 overs)
Shubman Gill 143 (142); Ravichandran Ashwin 1/57 (10 overs)		Devdutt Padikkal 31 (54); Jalaj Saxena 7/41 (9.5 overs)

India C won by 232 runs
JSCA International Stadium Complex, Ranchi
Umpires: Yeshwant Barde and Virender Sharma

- India C won the toss and elected to bat.

2 November 2019
09:00
Scorecard

India C 280/5 (50 overs)	v	India B 144 (43.4 overs)
Axar Patel 98* (61); Shahbaz Nadeem 2/37 (9 overs)		Baba Aparajith 53 (90); Mayank Markande 4/25 (10 overs)

India C won by 136 runs
JSCA International Stadium Complex, Ranchi
Umpires: Yeshwant Barde and Krishnamachari Srinivasan

- India C won the toss and elected to bat.

== Final ==
4 November 2019
08:45
Scorecard

India B 283/7 (50 overs)	v	India C 232/9 (50 overs)
Kedar Jadhav 86 (94); Ishan Porel 5/43 (10 overs)		Priyam Garg 74 (77); Shahbaz Nadeem 4/32 (10 overs)

India B won by 51 runs
JSCA International Stadium Complex, Ranchi
Umpires: Yeshwant Barde and Krishnamachari Srinivasan

- India B won the toss and elected to bat.
