= Vikash Mohan =

Vikash Mohan can refer to:

- Vikash Mohan (Indian cricketer), an Indian cricketer
- Vikash Mohan (Trinidadian cricketer) (born 1994), a Trinidadian cricketer
