= Navneet Singh =

Navneet Singh may refer to:

- Navneet Singh (cricketer)
- Navneet Singh (bowls)
