= Writtick Chatterjee =

Indian cricketer

Personal information
- Full name: Writtick Bijoy Chatterjee
- Born: 28 September 1992 (age 34); Jamtara, West Bengal, India
- Batting: Right-handed
- Bowling: Right-arm off-break
- Role: All-rounder

Domestic team information
- Years: Team
- 2013–present: Bengal
- 2022: Punjab Kings

Career statistics
| Competition | FC | LA | T20 |
|---|---|---|---|
| Matches | 19 | 25 | 42 |
| Runs scored | 791 | 354 | 354 |
| Batting average | 25.51 | 20.82 | 19.66 |
| 100s/50s | 2/2 | 0/0 | 0/1 |
| Top score | 216 | 37* | 51 |
| Balls bowled | 839 | 798 | 654 |
| Wickets | 10 | 16 | 30 |
| Bowling average | 42.80 | 41.93 | 23.43 |
| 5 wickets in innings | 1 | 0 | 0 |
| 10 wickets in match | 0 | 0 | 0 |
| Best bowling | 5/22 | 3/46 | 3/12 |
| Catches/stumpings | 10/– | 8/– | 17/– |
- Source: Cricinfo, 16 February 2025

Writtick Chatterjee (Bengali: ঋত্বিক চ্যাটার্জী; born 28 September 1992) is an Indian cricketer who plays for Bengal as an all-rounder. He made his Twenty20 debut for Bengal in the 2016–17 Inter State Twenty-20 Tournament on 1 February 2017.

In December 2017, he scored his maiden double-century in first-class cricket, batting for Bengal against Gujarat in the quarter-finals of the 2017–18 Ranji Trophy.

He made his List A debut for Bengal in the 2017–18 Vijay Hazare Trophy on 5 February 2018. In July 2018, he was named in the squad for India Red for the 2018–19 Duleep Trophy. In February 2022, he was bought by the Punjab Kings in the auction for the 2022 Indian Premier League tournament.
