= 2019–20 Duleep Trophy =

Cricket tournament

- Dates: 17 August – 8 September 2019
- Administrator: BCCI
- Cricket format: First-class cricket
- Tournament format(s): Round-robin and Finals
- Champions: India Red (2nd title)
- Participants: 3
- Matches: 4
- Most runs: Karun Nair (375)
- Most wickets: Akshay Wakhare (14)

The 2019–20 Duleep Trophy was the 58th season of the Duleep Trophy, a first-class cricket tournament in India. It took place in August and September 2019, starting the 2019–20 domestic cricket season in India. India Blue were the defending champions. Unlike the previous three seasons, the tournament was played as day games, played with a red ball. The final was initially announced as a day/night match with the pink ball. However, the final was changed and was played as a day game. The change was attributed due to players' preference.

The first match, between India Blue and India Green, saw only 49 overs bowled, all on the first day. Rain and a wet outfield prevented any further play, with both teams awarded one point each in the drawn match. The second match, between India Red and India Blue, also ended in a draw with India Red securing enough points to be the first team to advance to the final. During the match, Jalaj Saxena completed the double of scoring 6,000 runs and taking 300 wickets in first-class cricket. The third match, between India Green and India Red, was also drawn. India Green progressed to the final due to a superior quotient.

India Red won the tournament, beating India Green by an innings and 38 runs in the final.

== Squads ==
India Blue	India Green	India Red
Shubman Gill (c); Ashutosh Aman; Ankit Bawne; Ricky Bhui; Aniket Choudhary; Tushar Deshpande; Ruturaj Gaikwad; Shreyas Gopal; Saurabh Kumar; Snell Patel (wk); Diwesh Pathania; Rajat Patidar; Jalaj Saxena; Anmolpreet Singh; Basil Thampi	Faiz Fazal (c); Rahul Chahar; Priyam Garg; Dharmendrasinh Jadeja; Milind Kumar; Siddhesh Lad; Mayank Markande; Rajesh Mohanty; Akshdeep Nath; Ishan Porel; Ankit Rajpoot; Akshath Reddy; Dhruv Shorey; Tanveer Ul-Haq; Akshay Wadkar (wk); Jayant Yadav	Priyank Panchal (c); Varun Aaron; Harpreet Singh Bhatia; Abhimanyu Easwaran; Ankit Kalsi; Avesh Khan; Ishan Kishan (wk); KS Bharat (wk); Mahipal Lomror; Ronit More; Karun Nair; Axar Patel; Aditya Sarwate; Jaydev Unadkat; Akshay Wakhare; Sandeep Warrier

== Points table ==
Team	Pld	W	L	D	A	Pts	Quot
India Red	2	0	0	2	0	6	1.141
India Green	2	0	0	2	0	2	1.197
India Blue	2	0	0	2	0	2	0.630

Top two teams advance to the Final.

== Fixtures ==
=== Round-robin ===
17–20 August 2019
Scorecard

India Blue	v	India Green
112/6 (49 overs); Ruturaj Gaikwad 30 (63); Ishan Porel 3/26 (12 overs)

Match drawn
Just Cricket Academy Ground, Bengaluru
Umpires: Nitin Menon and Virender Sharma

- India Green won the toss and elected to field.
- No play was possible on days 2, 3 and 4 due to rain.
- Points: India Blue 1, India Green 1.

23–26 August 2019
Scorecard

India Red	v	India Blue
285 (124 overs); Ankit Kalsi 106 (345); Diwesh Pathania 4/55 (32 overs)		255 (83.2 overs); Ankit Bawne 121* (254); Avesh Khan 4/58 (20 overs)
297/6d (88 overs); Karun Nair 166* (223); Jalaj Saxena 4/105 (38 overs)

Match drawn
KSCA Cricket Ground, Alur
Umpires: K. N. Ananthapadmanabhan and Krishnamachari Srinivasan
Player of the match: Karun Nair (India Red)

- India Blue won the toss and elected to field.
- Points: India Red 3, India Blue 1.

29 August–1 September 2019
Scorecard

India Green	v	India Red
440 (131.3 overs); Akshath Reddy 146 (248); Akshay Wakhare 5/103 (30.3 overs)		441 (145.3 overs); Mahipal Lomror 126 (272); Dharmendrasinh Jadeja 4/135 (45 overs)
98/3 (54 overs); Dhruv Shorey 44* (140); Jaydev Unadkat 1/8 (6 overs)

Match drawn
KSCA Cricket Ground, Alur
Umpires: Anil Chaudhary and Yeshwant Barde
Player of the match: Mahipal Lomror (India Red)

- India Green won the toss and elected to bat.
- Points: India Red 3, India Green 1.

=== Final ===
4–8 September 2019
Scorecard

India Green	v	India Red
231 (72.1 overs); Mayank Markande 76* (121); Jaydev Unadkat 4/83 (24 overs)		388 (135 overs); Abhimanyu Easwaran 153 (300); Dharmendrasinh Jadeja 3/97 (37 overs)
119 (39.5 overs); Siddhesh Lad 42 (80); Akshay Wakhare 5/13 (5.5 overs)

India Red won by an innings and 38 runs
M. Chinnaswamy Stadium, Bangalore
Umpires: Chettithody Shamshuddin and Sundaram Ravi
Player of the match: Abhimanyu Easwaran (India Red)

- India Green won the toss and elected to bat.
