= Dhawal Kulkarni =

Indian cricketer (born 1988)

Personal information
- Full name: Dhawal Sunil Kulkarni
- Born: 10 December 1988 (age 37); Mumbai, Maharashtra, India
- Height: 1.84 m (6 ft 0 in)
- Batting: Right-handed
- Bowling: Right-arm medium
- Role: Bowling-All rounder

International information
- National side: India (2014–2016)
- ODI debut (cap 203): 2 September 2014 v England
- Last ODI: 26 October 2016 v New Zealand
- ODI shirt no.: 91
- T20I debut (cap 65): 20 June 2016 v Zimbabwe
- Last T20I: 22 June 2016 v Zimbabwe
- T20I shirt no.: 91

Domestic team information
- Years: Team
- 2006/07–2023/24: Mumbai
- 2008–2013: Mumbai Indians
- 2008/09: Wellington
- 2014–2015: Rajasthan Royals (squad no. 91)
- 2016–2017: Gujarat Lions (squad no. 91)
- 2018–2019: Rajasthan Royals
- 2020–2021: Mumbai Indians

Career statistics
Competition	ODI	T20I	FC	LA
Matches	12	2	96	130
Runs scored	27	1	1,793	533
Batting average	–	–	24.22	16.15
100s/50s	0/0	0/0	0/8	0/0
Top score	25*	1*	87	39*
Balls bowled	598	48	16,919	6,353
Wickets	19	3	285	223
Bowling average	26.73	18.33	27.11	22.13
5 wickets in innings	0	0	15	5
10 wickets in match	0	0	1	0
Best bowling	4/34	2/23	7/50	5/29
Catches/stumpings	2/–	0/–	30/–	35/–
- Source: ESPNcricinfo, 11 October 2024

Dhawal Sunil Kulkarni (born 10 December 1988) is an Indian former cricketer. He was a right arm medium-pace bowler and right-handed lower order batsman.

In first-class cricket, he played for Mumbai and in the Indian Premier League (IPL), he appeared for Mumbai Indians, Rajasthan Royals and Gujarat Lions. Based on his consistent performance in the domestic season and the IPL, he was selected for the Indian Test team for the away series against New Zealand in 2009. However, he was not selected to play in any of the three Test matches of the series.

== Domestic career ==
In the 2012–13 Ranji Trophy, he was one of the key faces to make Mumbai the Ranji Trophy champions for the 40th time. He took 5/33 against the Services in the Semi-final, after scoring 20* in the 1st innings. He followed it up with 4/24 and 5/32 against 1st time finalists Saurashtra to bowl them out for 148 and 82, and thus ensure a win by an innings and 125 runs in the final. He was rewarded with a chance in the India A cricket squad. He was selected for the quadrangular series in 2014 where he played a key role for India winning the cup.

For his performances in the 2016 IPL season, he was named in the ESPNcricinfo and Cricbuzz IPL XI

He was the leading wicket-taker for Mumbai in the 2017–18 Ranji Trophy, with 21 dismissals in six matches.

In January 2018, he was bought by the Rajasthan Royals in the 2018 IPL auction. In July 2018, he was named in the squad for India Blue for the 2018–19 Duleep Trophy. In October 2018, he was named in India A's squad for the 2018–19 Deodhar Trophy. In October 2019, he was named in India C's squad for the 2019–20 Deodhar Trophy.

== International career ==
He was included in the Test squad for the tour of New Zealand in 2009 but didn't make a debut. Following this success of quadrangular series in 2014 he was selected for the ODI squad for England tour. He made his One Day International debut in the 4th ODI against England in September 2014 at Edgbaston. He made his Twenty20 International (T20I) debut against Zimbabwe at Harare on 20 June 2016.

== Coaching career ==
In October 2026, Mumbai Indians announced Kulkarni had been appointed as the team's developmental bowling coach.
