= Shubham Kapse =

Indian cricketer (born 1994)

Personal information
- Born: 22 July 1994 (age 32); Nigaon,Buldhana district, Maharashtra
- Batting: Right-handed
- Bowling: Right-arm fast-medium
- Role: Bowler

Domestic team information
- Years: Team
- 2017- present: Vidarbha

Career statistics
Competition	First-class
Matches	3
Runs scored	0
Batting average	0
100s/50s	0
Top score	0
Balls bowled	234
Wickets	3
Bowling average	47.00
5 wickets in innings	0
10 wickets in match	0
Best bowling	2/47
Catches/stumpings	0/-
- Source: Cricinfo, 15 August 2026

Shubham Kapse (born 22 July 1994) is an Indian cricketer. He made his first-class debut for Vidarbha in the 2017–18 Ranji Trophy on 25 November 2017.

He was selected as a net bowler with Gujarat Titans.
