= Harpreet Singh Bhatia =

Emirati cricketer (born 1991)

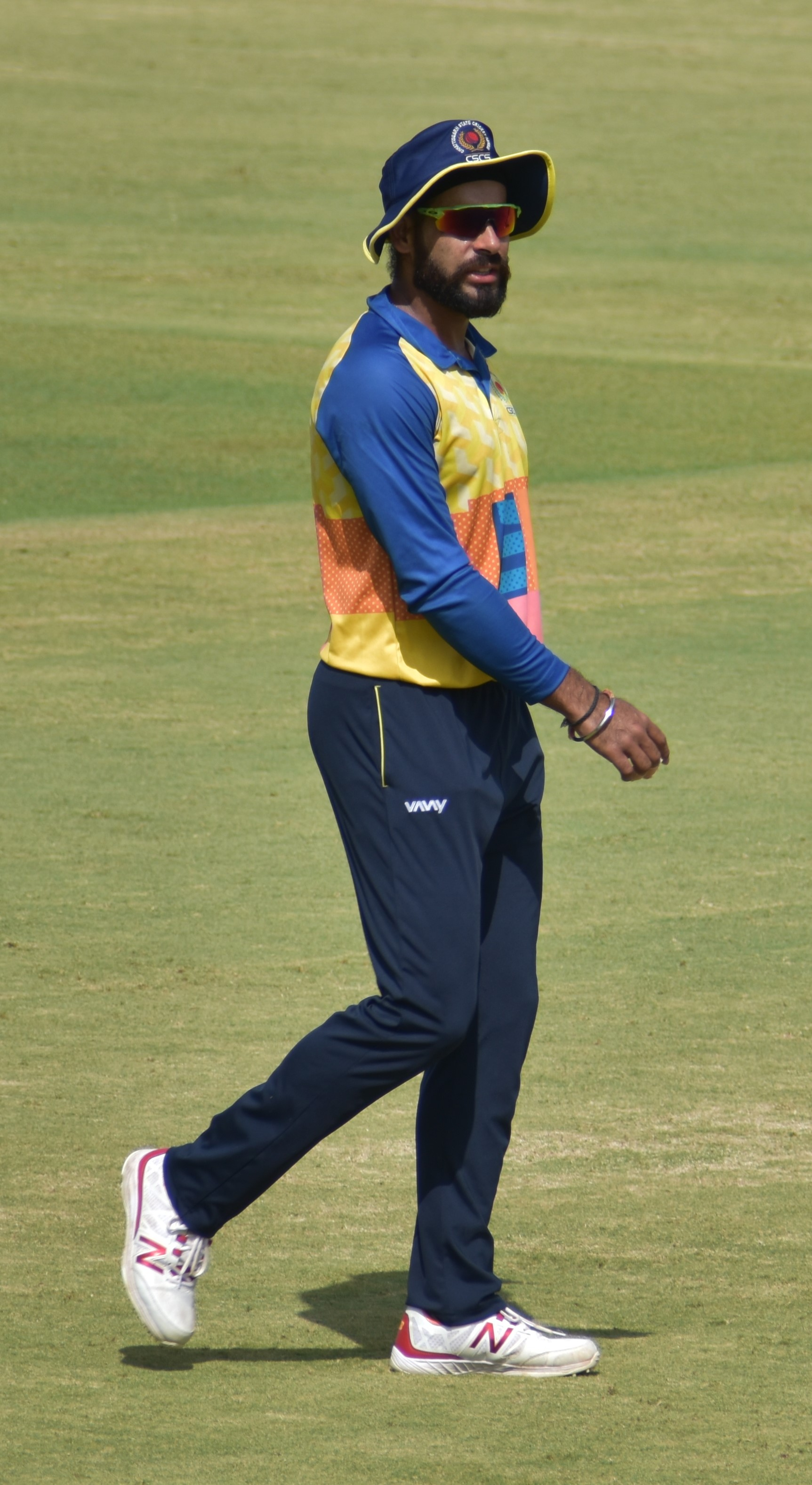
- Bhatia during the 2019–20 Vijay Hazare Trophy

Personal information
- Born: 11 August 1991 (age 35); Durg, Chhattisgarh, India
- Batting: Left-handed
- Bowling: Right-arm medium
- Role: Batter

International information
- National side: UAE (2026–present)
- ODI debut: 25 April 2026 v Nepal
- Last ODI: 11 August 2026 v Canada
- T20I debut: 20 April 2026 v Nepal
- Last T20I: 21 April 2026 v Nepal

Domestic team information
- Years: Team
- 2007/08–2017/18, 2024/25: Madhya Pradesh
- 2018/19–2023/24: Chhattisgarh
- 2010: Kolkata Knight Riders
- 2011–2012: Pune Warriors India
- 2023–2024: Punjab Kings

Career statistics
Competition	ODI	T20I	LA	T20
Matches	6	2	102	111
Runs scored	314	3	3,537	3,094
Batting average	52.33	1.50	42.61	35.15
100s/50s	0/3	0/0	6/20	0/21
Top score	81	2	121	92*
Catches/stumpings	3/–	0/–	55/–	59/–
- Source: Cricinfo, 30 August 2026

Harpreet Singh Bhatia (born 11 August 1991) is an Emirati cricketer who captains the ODI side of the United Arab Emirates national team. He is a left-hand batter who occasionally bowls right-arm medium pace.

== Domestic career ==
Bhatia represented India at the 2010 U19 World Cup. He also played for Madhya Pradesh and Chhattisgarh in Indian domestic cricket.

He was the leading run-scorer for Madhya Pradesh in the 2017–18 Ranji Trophy, with 629 runs in seven matches. He was also the leading run-scorer for Madhya Pradesh in the 2016–17 Vijay Hazare Trophy, with 271 runs in five matches.

Ahead of the 2018–19 Ranji Trophy, he transferred from Madhya Pradesh to Chhattisgarh. He was the leading run-scorer for Chhattisgarh in the tournament, with 627 runs in eight matches.

In August 2019, he was named in the India Red team's squad for the 2019–20 Duleep Trophy.

== Franchise career ==
=== Indian Premier League ===
He was a member of the Pune Warriors India squad in the 2011 Indian Premier League.

In April 2017, it was announced that he had been signed by Royal Challengers Bangalore to take part in the remainder of the Indian Premier League. After going unsold in the auction, he was picked up by Royal Challengers Bangalore after an injury suffered by Sarfaraz Khan.

== Personal life ==
In April 2026, Bhatia was granted United Arab Emirates (UAE) citizenship through naturalisation, allowing him to play for the UAE national cricket team by virtue of being a citizen of the country and possessing a passport.
