= Shourabh Kharwar =

Indian cricketer (born 1993)

Personal information
- Born: 6 February 1993 (age 33); Bhilai Nagar, Chhattisgarh
- Batting: Right handed
- Bowling: Right arm medium

Domestic team information
- Years: Team
- 2016–17: Chhattisgarh
- Source: ESPNcricinfo, 26 February 2017

Shourabh Kharwar (born 6 February 1993) is an Indian cricketer. He made his List A debut for Chhattisgarh in the 2016–17 Vijay Hazare Trophy on 26 February 2017. He made his first-class debut for Chhattisgarh in the 2017–18 Ranji Trophy on 1 November 2017. He made his Twenty20 debut on 12 January 2021, for Chhattisgarh in the 2020–21 Syed Mushtaq Ali Trophy.
