= Shivam Malhotra =

Indian cricketer (born 1991)

Personal information
- Born: 7 March 1991 (age 35)
- Source: ESPNcricinfo, 25 February 2017

Shivam Malhotra (born 7 March 1991) is an Indian cricketer. He made his List A debut for Mumbai in the 2016–17 Vijay Hazare Trophy on 25 February 2017. He made his first-class debut for Mumbai in the 2017–18 Ranji Trophy on 7 December 2017.
