= Abhishek Raman =

Indian cricketer (born 1993)

Personal information
- Born: 6 September 1993 (age 33); Delhi, India
- Batting: Left-handed
- Bowling: Right-arm off-break

Domestic team information
- Years: Team
- 2016–present: Bengal

Career statistics
Competition	FC	LA	T20
Matches	24	16	4
Runs scored	1,543	523	42
Batting average	37.63	40.23	21.00
100s/50s	3/6	2/2	0/0
Top score	176	122*	37
Balls bowled	12	6	-
Wickets	0	0	-
Bowling average	–	–	–
5 wickets in innings	–	–	–
10 wickets in match	–	–	–
Best bowling	–	–	–
Catches/stumpings	8/–	5/–	1/–
- Source: ESPNcricinfo, 18 January 2020

Abhishek Raman (born 6 September 1993) is an Indian first-class cricketer who plays for Bengal.

He made his first-class debut for Bengal in the 2016–17 Ranji Trophy on 29 November 2016. He made his Twenty20 debut for Bengal in the 2016–17 Inter State Twenty-20 Tournament on 1 February 2017. He made his List A debut for Bengal in the 2016–17 Vijay Hazare Trophy on 6 March 2017.

In November 2017, he scored his maiden first-class century, batting for Bengal against Himachal Pradesh in the 2017–18 Ranji Trophy. In July 2018, he was named in the squad for India Blue for the 2018–19 Duleep Trophy. In October 2019, he was named in India A's squad for the 2019–20 Deodhar Trophy.
