= Shahnawaz Hussain (cricketer) =

Indian cricketer (born 1993)

Personal information
- Full name: Mohammad Shahnawaz Hussain
- Born: 9 September 1993 (age 33); Bilaspur, Chhattisgarh, India
- Batting: Right-handed
- Bowling: Right-arm medium

Domestic team information
- Years: Team
- 2016/17: Chhattisgarh
- Source: ESPNcricinfo, 8 December 2017

Shahnawaz Hussain (born 9 September 1993) is an Indian first-class cricketer who plays for Chhattisgarh. He made his first-class debut for Chhattisgarh in the 2016-17 Ranji Trophy on 7 December 2016. In November 2017, he took his maiden five-wicket haul in first-class cricket, bowling for Chhattisgarh against Himachal Pradesh in the 2017-18 Ranji Trophy. He made his List A debut for Chhattisgarh in the 2017–18 Vijay Hazare Trophy on 5 February 2018.
