= Nitin Tanwar =

Indian cricketer (born 1996)

Personal information
- Born: 9 October 1996 (age 30); Delhi, India
- Source: ESPNcricinfo, 24 October 2017

Nitin Tanwar (born 9 October 1996) is an Indian cricketer. He made his first-class debut for Services in the 2017–18 Ranji Trophy on 24 October 2017. He made his List A debut for Services in the 2018–19 Vijay Hazare Trophy on 19 September 2018.
