= Manoj Singh =

Indian cricketer (born 1990)

Personal information
- Born: 15 October 1990 (age 36); Dehri, Bihar, India
- Source: ESPNcricinfo, 27 October 2016

Manoj Singh (born 15 October 1990) is an Indian cricketer. He made his first-class debut for Chhattisgarh in the 2016–17 Ranji Trophy on 27 October 2016. In October 2017, he scored his maiden first-class century for Chhattisgarh against Goa in the 2017–18 Ranji Trophy.

He made his Twenty20 debut for Chhattisgarh in the 2016–17 Inter State Twenty-20 Tournament on 29 January 2017. He made his List A debut for Chhattisgarh in the 2016–17 Vijay Hazare Trophy on 25 February 2017.
