= Shubham Singh =

Indian cricketer (born 1997)

Personal information
- Born: 5 January 1997 (age 29)
- Source: Cricinfo, 14 October 2017

Shubham Singh (born 5 January 1997) is an Indian cricketer. He made his first-class debut for Chhattisgarh in the 2017–18 Ranji Trophy on 14 October 2017. He made his Twenty20 debut for Chhattisgarhin the 2018–19 Syed Mushtaq Ali Trophy on 25 February 2019.
