= Jalaj Saxena =

Indian cricketer (born 1986)

Personal information
- Full name: Jalaj Sahai Saxena
- Born: 15 December 1986 (age 39); Indore, Madhya Pradesh, India
- Batting: Right-handed
- Bowling: Right arm off break
- Role: All-rounder
- Relatives: Jatin Saxena (brother)

Domestic team information
- Years: Team
- 2005/06–2015/16: Madhya Pradesh
- 2014/15: Mumbai Indians
- 2016/17–2025: Kerala (squad no. 6)
- 2025-current: Maharashtra
- 2021: Punjab Kings

Career statistics
Competition	FC	LA	T20
Matches	150	109	73
Runs scored	7,060	2,056	688
Batting average	33.77	24.77	16.78
100s/50s	14/34	3/7	0/1
Top score	194	133	55*
Balls bowled	27,045	5,008	1,235
Wickets	484	123	77
Bowling average	25.48	30.08	17.75
5 wickets in innings	34	1	2
10 wickets in match	10	0	0
Best bowling	9/68	7/41	5/16
Catches/stumpings	48/-	12/-	17/-
- Source: ESPNcricinfo, 9 April 2025

Jalaj Sahai Saxena (born 15 December 1986) is an Indian cricketer. An all-rounder who bats right-handed and bowls right-arm off spin, he is one of the most consistent performers in the Indian domestic circuit for over a decade. He made his domestic cricket debut for Madhya Pradesh in 2005 and later switched bases to Kerala in 2016 and to [Maharashtra] in 2025

== Early life ==
Jalaj was born on 15 December 1986 in Indore, Madhya Pradesh. Saxena's father was a professional swimmer who worked in Bhilai Steel Plant. Saxena took up swimming initially but was allergic. He then started taking cricket coaching emulating his elder brother, Jatin. Jalaj was initially a fast-bowling allrounder but later became an off-spinner. Jalaj has later represented Madhya Pradesh and Chhattisgarh in domestic cricket.

== Domestic career ==
=== Early years ===
Saxena made his first class debut for Madhya Pradesh on 17 December 2005 in the 2005-06 Ranji Trophy. He made his List A debut for Madhya Pradesh on 10 February 2006 in the 2005–06 Vijay Hazare Trophy. He made his Twenty20 debut for Madhya Pradesh on 21 October 2009 in the 2009-10 Syed Mushtaq Ali Trophy.

He was Madhya Pradesh's joint second highest wicket taker bagging 18 wickets in the 2007-08 Ranji Trophy. He scored 443 runs at an average of 55.37 in the 2008–09 Ranji Trophy including three centuries. In the 2008-09 Vijay Hazare Trophy, he topped the Madhya Pradesh bowlers and also scored his maiden List A century.

=== Consistent seasons ===
Saxena scored 769 runs at an average of 69.90 in the 2012–13 Ranji Trophy including two centuries. He was included in the India A team that played against the touring Australian team in February 2013, and scored 30 not out and took five wickets including the wickets of Test batsmen Phillip Hughes, Usman Khawaja and Ed Cowan. Against New Zealand A in August 2013, he took figures of 6/103 and was the highest wicket-taker in that series.

In the 2013–14 Ranji Trophy, Saxena scored 545 runs at an average of 41.92 with a top-score of 194, and took 35 wickets at an average of 19 including three five-wicket hauls and two ten-wicket hauls to finish among the top wicket-takers of the season.

In the 2014–15 Ranji Trophy, Saxena hit two centuries and amassed 583 runs at an average of 44.84. In a match against Tamil Nadu, he scored 144 and then bowled with the match figures 4/74 and 3/109 in the first and second innings respectively to win the man of the match. He was awarded the Lala Amarnath Award for best all-rounder by BCCI in January 2016.

Saxena continued his impressive all-round performance in 2015–16 Ranji Trophy, scoring 588 runs at an average of 36.75 with a top-score of 124 and taking 49 wickets at an average of 22.55 including four five-wicket hauls and one ten-wicket haul. He recorded match figures of 16 for 154 against Railways. He took eight wickets for 96 runs in the first innings and eight wickets for 58 runs in the second innings. These are the second-best figures in the history of the Ranji Trophy.

In the first match of the 2015–16 Vijay Hazare Trophy, opening the innings, Saxena scored a run-a-ball 133 against Saurashtra in a 300-plus run chase. He finished with 230 runs and eight wickets.

=== Move to Kerala ===
Saxena signed a one-year contract with Kerala as a professional player for the 2016–17 season.

He was the leading wicket-taker in the 2017–18 Ranji Trophy, with 44 dismissals and was fundamental in Kerala's first ever quarter-final entry in the season. He was also the second highest run getter for Kerala. In July 2018, he was named in the squad for India Green for the 2018–19 Duleep Trophy. He was the leading run-scorer for Kerala in the 2018–19 Ranji Trophy, with 551 runs in nine matches. In the match against Andhra Pradesh in the season, he also became the only Indian to hit a century and take an eight-wicket innings-haul in the same match twice, having achieved the feat previously against Rajasthan in the last season.

In January 2019, he was picked in the India A team for their first four-day game against England Lions, thus earning a call-up to the India A side for the first time since 2013.

In August 2019, he was named in the India Blue team's squad for the 2019–20 Duleep Trophy. In the second match of the tournament, he completed the double of scoring 6,000 runs and taking 300 wickets in first-class cricket and became the first uncapped Indian to achieve the feat.

In September 2019, he was added to India A's squad for the first four-day match against South Africa A as a replacement for the injured Krishnappa Gowtham. He scored an unbeaten 61 in the first match and was declared the man of the match.

In October 2019, he was named in India C's squad for the 2019–20 Deodhar Trophy and finished as the highest wicket-taker of the tournament.

== Indian Premier League ==
Saxena was part of Mumbai Indians in the 2013 and 2014 seasons of IPL. He then joined Royal Challengers Bangalore for the 2015 Indian Premier League.

He was bought by the Delhi Capitals in the player auction for the 2019 Indian Premier League. He was released by the Delhi Capitals ahead of the 2020 IPL auction.

In February 2021, Saxena was bought by the Punjab Kings in the IPL auction ahead of the 2021 Indian Premier League. He made his IPL debut for Punjab against Delhi Capitals in the 2021 season.
