= Navneet Kaur =

Navneet Kaur may refer to:

- Navneet Kaur Rana (born 1986), Indian actress
- Navneet Kaur Dhillon (born 1992), Indian actress, model and pageant winner
- Navneet Kaur (field hockey) (born 1996), Indian field hockey player
