= Nikhil Gangta =

Indian cricketer (born 1992)

Personal information
- Born: 1 September 1992 (age 34); Shimla, Himachal Pradesh, India
- Batting: Right-handed
- Bowling: Right-arm medium

Domestic team information
- Years: Team
- 2012–: Himachal Pradesh
- 2018–: India Blue
- FC debut: 15 December 2012 Himachal Pradesh v Goa
- Last FC: 20 December 2023 Himachal Pradesh v Vidarbha
- LA debut: 13 February 2013 Himachal Pradesh v Services
- Last LA: 17 February 2018 Himachal Pradesh v Bengal

Career statistics
Competition	FC	LA	T20
Matches	50	41	29
Runs scored	2,612	1,068	332
Batting average	40.81	31.41	19.52
100s/50s	7/11	1/6	0/1
Top score	203	100*	52*
Balls bowled	771	188	77
Wickets	8	6	2
Bowling average	43.87	31.00	60.50
5 wickets in innings	0	0	0
10 wickets in match	0	0	0
Best bowling	2/19	2/13	1/10
Catches/stumpings	30/–	14/–	8/–
- Source: ESPNcricinfo, 19 May 2021

Nikhil Gangta (born 1 September 1992) is an Indian cricketer who plays for Himachal Pradesh. He made his first-class debut for Himachal Pradesh against Goa in 2012-13 Ranji Trophy on 15 December 2012.

In July 2018, he was named in the squad for India Blue for the 2018–19 Duleep Trophy. He scored a century in the final of the tournament, which India Blue went on to win, and he was named the man of the match.
