= Siddharth Chandrakar =

Indian cricketer (born 1993)

Personal information
- Born: 23 February 1993 (age 33); Durg, Madhya Pradesh
- Batting: Right handed
- Bowling: Right arm offbreak

Domestic team information
- Years: Team
- 2017–18: Chhattisgarh
- Source: Cricinfo, 1 November 2017

Siddharth Chandrakar (born 23 February 1993) is an Indian cricketer. He made his first-class debut for Chhattisgarh in the 2017–18 Ranji Trophy on 1 November 2017.
