= Siddhesh Neral =

Indian cricketer (born 1994)

Personal information
- Born: 3 June 1994 (age 32)
- Source: Cricinfo, 14 October 2017

Siddhesh Neral (born 3 June 1994) is an Indian cricketer. He made his first-class debut for Vidarbha in the 2017–18 Ranji Trophy on 14 October 2017. He made his Twenty20 debut on 8 November 2021, for Vidarbha in the 2021–22 Syed Mushtaq Ali Trophy.
