= Dhruv Shorey =

Indian cricketer (born 1992)

Personal information
- Full name: Dhruv Ranjan Shorey
- Born: 5 June 1992 (age 34); Delhi, India
- Batting: Right-handed
- Bowling: Right-arm offbreak
- Role: Top-order batter

Domestic team information
- Years: Team
- 2013–2022: Delhi
- 2018–2019: Chennai Super Kings
- 2023–present: Vidarbha

Career statistics
| Competition | FC | LA | T20 |
|---|---|---|---|
| Matches | 77 | 74 | 54 |
| Runs scored | 5,455 | 2,957 | 1,236 |
| Batting average | 48.70 | 44.80 | 30.14 |
| 100s/50s | 15/24 | 8/19 | 0/10 |
| Top score | 252* | 136 | 84 |
| Balls bowled | 508 | 227 | 6 |
| Wickets | 4 | 8 | 0 |
| Bowling average | 71.75 | 23.50 | – |
| 5 wickets in innings | 0 | 0 | 0 |
| 10 wickets in match | 0 | 0 | 0 |
| Best bowling | 2/47 | 3/31 | – |
| Catches/stumpings | 60/– | 38/– | 26/– |
- Source: ESPNcricinfo, 28 October 2025

Dhruv Shorey (born 5 June 1992) is an Indian cricketer who plays for Vidarbha. He made his first-class debut for Delhi on 30 October in the 2015–16 Ranji Trophy.

In the final of the 2017–18 Ranji Trophy, he scored a century in the first innings, batting for Delhi against Vidarbha. In January 2018, he was bought by the Chennai Super Kings in the 2018 IPL auction.

In July 2018, he was named in the squad for India Blue for the 2018–19 Duleep Trophy. He was the leading run-scorer in the tournament, with 293 runs in three matches. In August 2019, he was named in the India Green team's squad for the 2019–20 Duleep Trophy. He was released by the Chennai Super Kings ahead of the 2020 IPL auction.
