= Mamta Chandrakar =

Indian Folk singer

Mamta Chandrakar PS
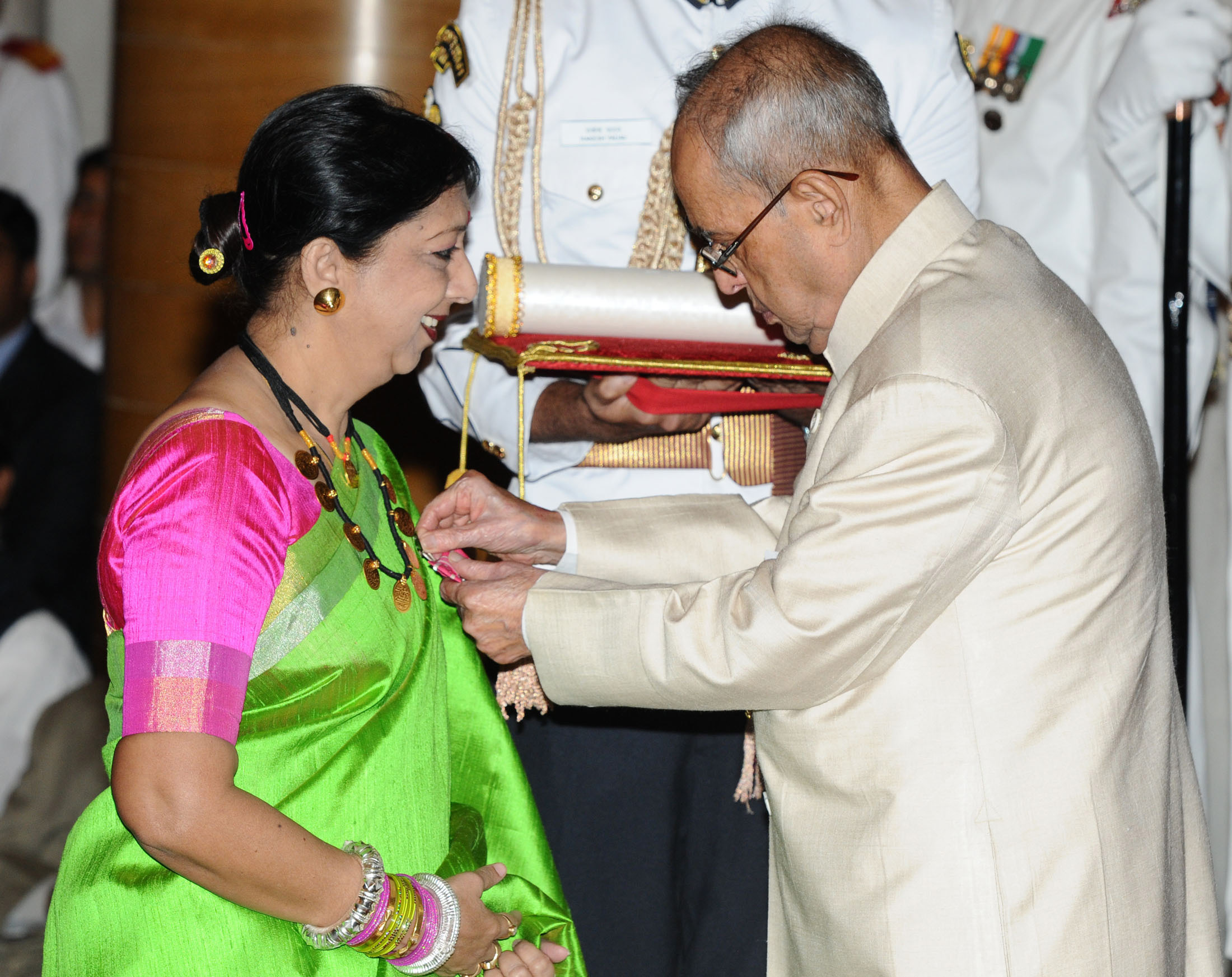
- The President, Shri Pranab Mukherjee presenting the Padma Shri Award to Smt. Mamta Chandrakar, at a Civil Investiture Ceremony, at Rashtrapati Bhavan, in New Delhi on 12 April 2016.
- Born: 3 December 1958 (age 67); Durg, Chhattisgarh, India
- Other name: Mokshada Chandrakar
- Occupations: Kulpati, Indira Kala Sangeet Vishwavidyalaya, Khairagarh Asst. Director All India Radio Akashvani in Raipur, Playback Singer, Chhattisgarhi Folk Singer
- Years active: 1968–present
- Spouse: Prem Chandrakar
- Children: Purvi Chandrakar
- Parent(s): Dau Mahasingh Chandrakar (father); Gayabai Chandrakar (mother)
- Relatives: Dr. B.L.Chandrakar (Brother); Pramila Chandrakar (Sister)
- Honours: Sangeet Natak Akademi Award (2023); Chhattisgarh Vibhuti Alankaran (2018); Padma Shri (2016); D.El.Ed Degree (2014) from Indira Kala Sangeet Vishwavidyalaya; Chhattisgarh Ratna (2013); Dau Dular Singh Mandraji Honours (2012)

Mamta Chandrakar (born 3 December 1958) is a Padma Shri Awarded folk singer of Chhattisgarh. She is referred to as the Nightingale of Chhattisgarh. Mamta Chandrakar has her post graduation degree in singing from Indira Kala Sangeet Vishwavidyalaya. Mamta Chandrakar has started singing from the age of 10 years and professionally took it as folk singer in 1977 with Aakashvani Kendra Raipur. She is a Padmashree Awardee in 2016 for her work, she has bagged several other state-level awards. Her husband Prem Chandrakar is a producer and director in Chhollywood.

== Early life ==
Mamta Chandrakar was born in the year 1958 to Mr. Dau Maha Singh Chandrakar who himself had deep knowledge of folk music. The time when Bollywood music was influencing the local folk music, he started a company called "Sonha-Bihan" in 1974. Sonha-Bihan was aimed to keep the soul of folk music alive in people's hearts and minds. With this thought Sonha-Bihan performed in front of forty to fifty thousand people in March 1974. Late Dau Maha Singh dedicated his whole life to promote the folk music. Mamta Chandrakar took her early lessons from her father himself. She then enrolled in Indira Kala Sangeet Vishwavidyalaya for further studies in music. In 1986, she married Prem Chandrakar, a director and producer of Chhattisgarhi Cinema. The couple had a daughter in 1988.

== Awards ==
- 2023 Sangeet Natak Akademi Award
- 2019 Chhattisgarh Vibhuti Alankaran
- 2016 Padma Shri Award
- 2013 Chhattisgarh Ratna
- 2012 Dau Dular Singh Mandraji Honours
- Saurabh Chandrakar
