= Snell Patel =

Indian cricketer (born 1993)

Personal information
- Born: 15 October 1993 (age 33); Rajkot, Gujarat, India
- Batting: Right handed
- Role: Wicketkeeper

Domestic team information
- Years: Team
- 2016–17: Saurashtra
- Source: ESPNcricinfo, 24 November 2016

Snell Patel (born 15 October 1993) is an Indian cricketer. He made his first-class debut for Saurashtra in the 2014–15 Ranji Trophy on 6 February 2015. He made his List A debut for Saurashtra in the 2016–17 Vijay Hazare Trophy on 28 February 2017.

In August 2019, he was named to the India Blue team's squad for the 2019–20 Duleep Trophy.
