= Vikas Mishra =

Indian cricketer (born 1992)

Personal information
- Born: 27 December 1992 (age 33); Delhi, India
- Batting: Right-handed
- Bowling: Slow left-arm orthodox
- Role: Bowler

Domestic team information
- Years: Team
- 2009/10–: Delhi
- FC debut: 15 December 2009 Delhi v Kolkata
- Last FC: 9 December 2011 Delhi v Madhya Pradesh
- LA debut: 12 February 2010 Delhi v Punjab
- Last LA: 28 February 2012 Delhi v Services

Career statistics
Competition	FC	LA	T20
Matches	15	9	1
Runs scored	46	2	–
Batting average	3.83	2.00	–
100s/50s	0/0	0/0	–
Top score	18	2	–
Balls bowled	3,186	444	18
Wickets	55	10	1
Bowling average	26.38	28.90	24
5 wickets in innings	4	0	0
10 wickets in match	1	0	0
Best bowling	10/138	4/50	1/24
Catches/stumpings	4/0	0/0	1/–
- Source: ESPNcricinfo, 1 June 2012

Vikas Mishra (born 27 December 1992) is an Indian first-class cricketer. He was also a member of Indian Premier League team Delhi Daredevils. Vikas was also a part of 15 member Indian squad to 2012 ICC Under-19 Cricket World Cup.

In July 2018, he was named in the squad for India Green for the 2018–19 Duleep Trophy. He was the leading wicket-taker for Delhi in the 2018–19 Ranji Trophy, with 33 dismissals in seven matches.
