= Shahbaz Nadeem =

Indian cricketer

Personal information
- Born: 12 August 1989 (age 37); Bokaro, Jharkhand, India
- Batting: Right-handed
- Bowling: Slow left-arm orthodox
- Role: Bowler

International information
- National side: India (2019–2021)
- Test debut (cap 296): 19 October 2019 v South Africa
- Last Test: 5 February 2021 v England

Domestic team information
- Years: Team
- 2004–present: Jharkhand
- 2011–2018: Delhi Daredevils (squad no. 88)
- 2019–2021: Sunrisers Hyderabad (squad no. 88)

Career statistics
Competition	Test	FC	LA	T20
Matches	2	140	134	150
Runs scored	1	2,784	1011	278
Batting average	0.50	15.29	15.08	7.72
100s/50s	0/0	2/8	0/1	0/0
Top score	1*	177	53	36*
Balls bowled	458	34,259	7,064	3,153
Wickets	8	542	175	125
Bowling average	34.12	28.86	28.88	28.43
5 wickets in innings	0	28	4	0
10 wickets in match	0	7	0	0
Best bowling	2/18	7/45	8/10	4/12
Catches/stumpings	1/–	57/–	38/–	28/–
- Source: ESPNcricinfo, 16 March 2025

Shahbaz Nadeem (born 12 August 1989) is an Indian former international cricketer who played as a slow left-arm orthodox bowler. He made his first-class cricket debut in December 2004. He played for Bihar U-14, Indian U-19s and Jharkhand. In March 2024, he announced his retirement from Indian international cricket.

In September 2018, he set a new record for the best bowling figures in a List A cricket match by taking eight wickets for 10 runs against Rajasthan whilst playing for Jharkhand.

He was born in Bokaro Steel City, Jharkhand. He completed his schooling at St. Xavier's, Bokaro, De Nobili School, Dhanbad and Delhi Public School, Kolkata.

== Domestic career ==
Even before he made his first-class debut, Nadeem was seen as a prospective big left-arm slow bowler. He has a classical, flowing lefty's action, is naturally inclined to bowl round the wicket to right-hand batsmen, and experiments with varying degrees of loop. In addition, he is an athletic fielder and a fixture at point for his state and the East Zone team. He came into the reckoning with a nine-wicket haul against Sikkim in an Under-15 game in 2002. After a strong first-class debut, he found himself under the hammer against Australia in the Under-19 one-dayers, and played only one match in the Under-19 World Cup.

In the 2012 IPL season Nadeem made a breakthrough in the Delhi Daredevils team with impressive performances. He was also one of the seven players nominated for IPL Rising Star of the year award.

He finished consecutive years – The 2015–16 Ranji Trophy and 2016–17 Ranji Trophy seasons with the most wickets in the competition, with a total of 51 and 56 dismissals respectively. He was also the leading wicket-taker for Jharkhand in the 2017–18 Ranji Trophy, with 18 dismissals in four matches.

In January 2018, he was bought by the Delhi Daredevils in the 2018 IPL auction. In July 2018, he was named in the squad for India Red for the 2018–19 Duleep Trophy.

In September 2018, in the 2018–19 Vijay Hazare Trophy fixture between Rajasthan and Jharkhand, Nadeem set a new List A cricket record, taking eight wickets for ten runs from 10 overs. He also took hatrick wickets while achieving that feat. He was the leading wicket-taker in the tournament, with twenty-four dismissals in nine matches.

In October 2018, he was named in India B's squad for the 2018–19 Deodhar Trophy. In October 2019, he was named in India B's squad for the 2019–20 Deodhar Trophy. In February 2022, he was bought by the Lucknow Super Giants in the auction for the 2022 Indian Premier League tournament. During the 2021-22 Ranji Trophy preliminary quarter final against Nagaland cricket team, Nadeem registered his highest first class score, scoring 177 runs.

== International career ==
In October 2018, he was named in India's Twenty20 International (T20I) squad for their series against the West indies, but he did not play. In October 2019, he was added to India's squad for the third Test match against South Africa, as cover for Kuldeep Yadav. He made his Test debut for India, against South Africa, on 19 October 2019.

In January 2021, he was named as one of five standby players in India's Test squad for their series against England. Owing to a knee injury to Axar Patel, Nadeem was added to the squad and also selected in the playing XI for the first Test.
