= Vikash Mohan (Indian cricketer) =

Indian cricketer

Personal information
- Full name: Vikash Mohan
- Source: Cricinfo, 9 November 2017

Vikash Mohan is an Indian cricketer. He made his first-class debut for Services in the 2017–18 Ranji Trophy on 9 November 2017.
