= Abhishek Gupta (cricketer) =

Indian cricketer (born 1990)

Personal information
- Born: 30 September 1990 (age 36)
- Source: ESPNcricinfo, 6 October 2017

Abhishek Gupta (born 30 September 1990) is an Indian cricketer. He made his first-class debut for Punjab in the 2017–18 Ranji Trophy on 6 October 2017, scoring a century. He made his Twenty20 debut for Punjab in the 2017–18 Zonal T20 League on 9 January 2018. He made his List A debut for Punjab in the 2017–18 Vijay Hazare Trophy on 7 February 2018.

In June 2018, the Board of Control for Cricket in India (BCCI) gave him a retrospective eight-month doping ban. The following month, he was named in the squad for India Red for the 2018–19 Duleep Trophy. However, he was withdrawn from the squad and replaced by Akshay Wadkar.
