= Navneet Singh (cricketer) =

Indian cricketer (born 1994)

Personal information
- Born: 7 December 1994 (age 31)
- Source: ESPNcricinfo, 6 October 2017

Navneet Singh (born 7 December 1994) is an Indian cricketer. He made his first-class debut for Services in the 2017–18 Ranji Trophy on 6 October 2017. He made his Twenty20 debut on 17 November 2019, for Services in the 2019–20 Syed Mushtaq Ali Trophy.
