= Atit Sheth =

Indian cricketer (born 1996)

Personal information
- Full name: Atit Arpit Sheth
- Born: 3 February 1996 (age 30); Vadodara, Gujarat, India
- Batting: Right-handed
- Bowling: Right-arm medium-fast
- Role: All-rounder

Domestic team information
- Years: Team
- 2015-present: Baroda
- Source: ESPNcricinfo, 2 November 2015

Atit Sheth (born 3 February 1996) is an Indian cricketer who plays for Baroda. He made his first-class debut on 30 October in the 2015–16 Ranji Trophy. He made his List A debut for Baroda in the 2016–17 Vijay Hazare Trophy on 25 February 2017.

He was the leading wicket-taker for Baroda in the 2017–18 Ranji Trophy, with 21 dismissals in six matches. In July 2018, he was named in the squad for India Green for the 2018–19 Duleep Trophy.

In December 2018, he was named in India's team for the 2018 ACC Emerging Teams Asia Cup.
