= Akshay Karnewar =

Indian cricketer

Personal information
- Born: 12 October 1992 (age 34); Wagholi, Maharashtra, India
- Batting: Left-handed
- Bowling: Right arm off spin, Slow left arm orthodox

Domestic team information
- Years: Team
- 2015–: Vidarbha
- Source: ESPNcricinfo, 10 January 2016

Akshay Kisanrao Karnewar (born 12 October 1992) is an Indian cricketer who plays for Vidarbha. He made his List A debut on 10 December 2015 in the 2015–16 Vijay Hazare Trophy. He made his Twenty20 debut on 3 January 2016 in the 2015–16 Syed Mushtaq Ali Trophy. He started off as a right arm off-spinner, but since he does everything except writing with his left hand, he was encouraged to learn to bowl slow left-arm orthodox.

He made his first-class debut for Vidarbha in the 2016–17 Ranji Trophy on 27 October 2016. In October 2017, he took his maiden five-wicket haul in first-class cricket, taking 6 wickets for 47 runs against Punjab in the 2017–18 Ranji Trophy. He was the leading wicket-taker for Vidarbha in the 2018–19 Vijay Hazare Trophy, with fifteen dismissals in seven matches.

On 8 November 2021, in the 2021–22 Syed Mushtaq Ali Trophy match between Vidarbha and Manipur, Karnewar became the first bowler to bowl four overs in a Twenty20 cricket match without conceding a run. The following day, in Vidarbha's match against Sikkim, Karnewar took a hat-trick.
