= Vikas Yadav (cricketer) =

Indian cricketer (born 1996)

Personal information
- Full name: Vikas Umesh Yadav
- Born: 20 July 1996 (age 30); Bharuch, Gujarat, India
- Source: ESPNcricinfo, 6 October 2016

Vikas Yadav (born 20 July 1996) is an Indian cricketer. He made his first-class debut for Services in the 2016–17 Ranji Trophy on 6 October 2016. He made his List A debut for Services in the 2017–18 Vijay Hazare Trophy on 5 February 2018. He made his Twenty20 debut for Services in the 2018–19 Syed Mushtaq Ali Trophy on 21 February 2019.
