= Sudip Chatterjee (cricketer) =

Indian cricketer (born 1991)

Personal information
- Full name: Sudip Dipen Chatterjee
- Born: 11 November 1991 (age 35); Barasat, West Bengal, India
- Batting: Left-handed
- Bowling: Leg break Googly
- Role: Top-order batter

Domestic team information
- Years: Team
- 2010–2022,2024–present: Bengal
- 2018/19: Prime Bank Cricket Club
- 2022–2023: Tripura

Career statistics
Competition	FC	LA	T20
Matches	86	77	40
Runs scored	5,600	1,757	676
Batting average	41.17	25.83	21.12
100s/50s	14/28	0/15	0/5
Top score	209	97	89
Balls bowled	108	32	6
Wickets	3	1	0
Bowling average	27.33	36.00	–
5 wickets in innings	0	0	0
10 wickets in match	0	0	0
Best bowling	1/0	1/4	–
Catches/stumpings	58/–	35/–	12/–
- Source: ESPNcricinfo, 1 February 2026

Sudip Dipen Chatterjee (Bengali: সুদীপ দীপেন চ্যাটার্জি; born 11 November 1991) is an Indian cricketer who plays for Bengal cricket team. He is a left-handed batsman and occasional leg break googly bowler.

Chatterjee has been the mainstay of the Bengal batting line up since making his debut. A prolific scorer in the domestic circuit in all formats, Chatterjee was rewarded with an India A call up for the tour of South Africa in 2017. Chatterjee hails from a middle-class family in Kolkata and is the son of a garment retailer. His wife's name is Papiya Chatterjee.

In July 2018, he was named in the squad for India Green for the 2018–19 Duleep Trophy.
