= Ishan Porel =

Indian cricketer (born 1998)

Personal information
- Full name: Ishan Chandranath Porel
- Born: 5 September 1998 (age 28); Chandannagar, West Bengal, India
- Height: 6 ft 3 in (191 cm)
- Batting: Right-handed
- Bowling: Right-arm medium
- Role: Bowler
- Relatives: Abhishek Porel (cousin)

Domestic team information
- Years: Team
- 2017–present: Bengal
- 2021: Punjab Kings

Career statistics
Competition	FC	LA	T20
Matches	50	36	31
Runs scored	141	24	2
Batting average	4.86	3.42	–
100s/50s	0/0	0/0	0/0
Top score	22	9*	2*
Balls bowled	7,539	1,618	641
Wickets	137	54	40
Bowling average	26.41	24.91	19.32
5 wickets in innings	5	2	0
10 wickets in match	0	–	–
Best bowling	6/103	6/34	4/24
Catches/stumpings	4/–	4/–	1/–
- Source: ESPNcricinfo, 11 February 2026

Ishan Porel (Bengali: ঈশান পোড়েল; born 5 September 1998) is an Indian cricketer. He made his List A debut for Bengal in the 2016–17 Vijay Hazare Trophy on 25 February 2017. He made his first-class debut for Bengal in the 2017–18 Ranji Trophy on 9 November 2017. He played for Punjab Kings in the Indian Premier League.

== Early life ==
Porel is originally from the city Chandannagar, about 50 km away from Kolkata. His family has a long tradition of sports, with his father and grandfather playing Kabaddi. His grandfather Subodh Chandra Porel represented India while his father Chandranath Porel played for Bengal in the state level. So taking sports seriously has become a sort of Porel's family tradition. Cricket may have been his first love, but it wasn't the first sport he pursued.

"There was no objection from family as to which sport I pick up. I started off from swimming and table tennis, but I wasn't enjoying those games. When I started playing cricket and started enjoying it, my parents cautioned me. If you pursue another sport and drop off, it won't be good for me."

Porel started his cricketing journey at the National Sporting Club in his hometown, Chandannagar. He came to Kolkata in 2012 for a cricket clinic. Inspired by Sachin Tendulkar and Sourav Ganguly, Porel auditioned for batting. Later, he took up fast bowing on the advice of his coaches, who saw a pacer in his tall, slender and lanky frame.

== Personal life ==
He is the cousin of Indian wicket-keeper batter Abhishek Porel.

== Domestic career ==
Porel made his List A debut for Bengal in the 2016–17 Vijay Hazare Trophy against Vidarbha and first-class debut for the state side in the 2017–18 Ranji Trophy against Haryana. He featured in Bengal's win over Delhi in the Cooch Behar Trophy final and earned a call-up for Youth ODIs against England at home. In July 2018, he was named in the squad for India Red for the 2018–19 Duleep Trophy. In August 2019, he was named in the India Green team's squad for the 2019–20 Duleep Trophy. Two months later, he was named in the India C squad for the 2019–20 Deodhar Trophy. Porel was selected for the India A tour of New Zealand in January and February 2020.

=== Indian Premier League ===
In the 2020 IPL auction, he was bought by the Kings XI Punjab ahead of the 2020 Indian Premier League. On 21 September 2021, in the 32nd match of the 2021 Indian Premier League, Porel made his IPL debut, against the Rajasthan Royals. In the match, he bowled four overs, conceded 39 runs and took one wicket. He did not feature in any of the rest of the matches of the tournament. In February 2022, he was bought by the Punjab Kings in the auction for the 2022 Indian Premier League tournament.

== International career ==
Porel was called up to the U19 World Cup side in December 2017. In December 2017, Porel was named in India's squad for the 2018 Under-19 Cricket World Cup. He injured himself in the World Cup tournament opener and was ruled out of rest of the league matches. Porel played his first match of the tournament in the quarterfinal against Bangladesh. He immediately impressed, bowling 5 overs for 8 runs. He grabbed headlines with figures of 4/17 in the next match against Pakistan in the semifinal of the event at Christchurch. Throughout the tournament, Porel routinely took the new ball for India, with Nagarkoti coming in as first-change.

On 26 October 2020, Porel was named as one of four additional bowlers to travel with the India cricket team for their tour to Australia. In June 2021, he was named as one of five net bowlers for India's tour of Sri Lanka. Following a positive case for COVID-19 in the Indian team, Porel was added to India's main squad for their final two Twenty20 International (T20I) matches of the tour, albeit he did not get the chance to play in any of those couple of matches
