= Mayank Markande =

Indian cricketer

Personal information
- Born: 11 November 1997 (age 29); Bathinda, Punjab, India
- Batting: Right-handed
- Bowling: Right-arm leg break
- Role: Bowler

International information
- National side: India
- T20I debut (cap 80): 24 February 2019 v Australia

Domestic team information
- Years: Team
- 2018–present: Punjab
- 2018–2019, 2022, 2026: Mumbai Indians
- 2020–2021: Rajasthan Royals
- 2023–2024: Sunrisers Hyderabad
- 2025: Kolkata Knight Riders

Career statistics
Competition	T20I
Matches	1
Runs scored	–
Batting average	–
100s/50s	–
Top score	–
Balls bowled	24
Wickets	0
Bowling average	–
5 wickets in innings	–
10 wickets in match	–
Best bowling	–
Catches/stumpings	0/–
- Source: ESPNcricinfo, 9 January 2023

Mayank Markande (born 11 November 1997) is an Indian cricketer who plays for Punjab in domestic cricket and Mumbai Indians in the Indian Premier League. He made his international debut for the India cricket team in February 2019.

Markande comes from Patiala. He studied at Yadavindra Public School and was part of the school's cricket team.

== Domestic career ==
Markande made his Twenty20 debut for Punjab in the 2017–18 Syed Mushtaq Ali Trophy on 14 January 2018. In January 2018, he was bought by Mumbai Indians in the 2018 IPL auction. He made his List A debut for Punjab in the 2017–18 Vijay Hazare Trophy on 7 February 2018 in Bengaluru. and made his debut for the team during the season. In his first two matches, he took seven wickets, including three on debut.

In October 2018, Markande was named in India B's squad for the 2018–19 Deodhar Trophy. He made his first-class debut for Punjab in the 2018–19 Ranji Trophy on 1 November 2018. He was the leading wicket-taker for Punjab in the tournament, with 29 dismissals in six matches.

In March 2019, he was named as one of eight players to watch by the International Cricket Council (ICC) ahead of the 2019 Indian Premier League tournament. In October 2019, he was named in India C's squad for the 2019–20 Deodhar Trophy.

In February 2022, he was bought back by the Mumbai Indians in the auction for the 2022 Indian Premier League tournament. He was bought by Sunrisers Hyderabad for Rs.50 Lakh, in the 2023 Indian Premier League auction. In the mega auction of IPL 2025, Markande was bought by Kolkata Knight Riders. He did not play any match for them. Ahead of IPL 2026, he was traded to Mumbai Indians.

== International career ==
In December 2018, he was named in India's team for the 2018 ACC Emerging Teams Asia Cup. In February 2019, he was named in India's Twenty20 International (T20I) squad for their series against Australia. He made his T20I debut for India against Australia on 24 February 2019.
