= Anmolpreet Singh =

Indian cricketer (born 1998)

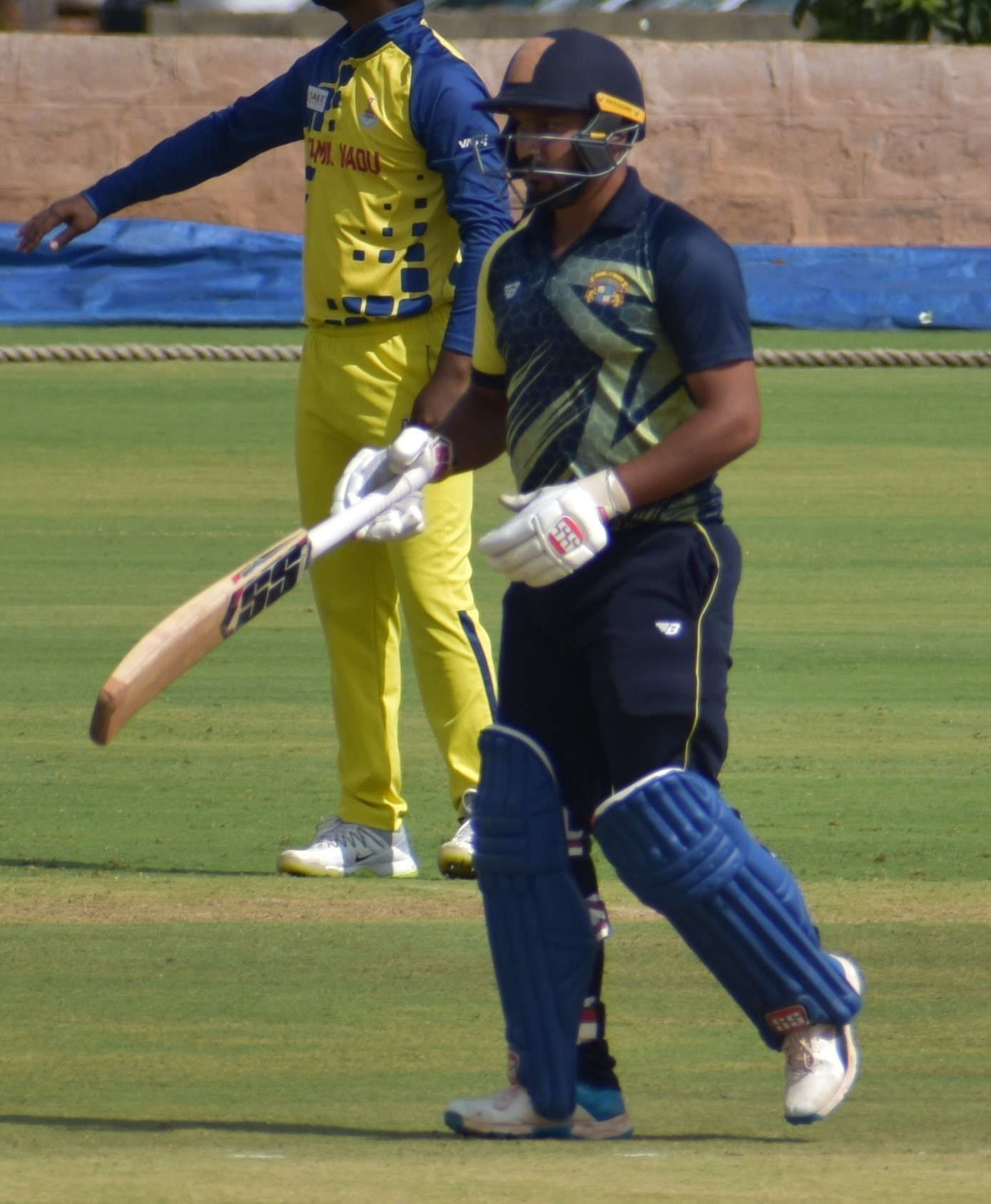
- Anmolpreet Singh in 2019

Personal information
- Born: 28 March 1998 (age 28); Patiala, Punjab, India
- Batting: Right-handed
- Bowling: Right-arm off-break
- Role: Batter
- Relatives: Prabhsimran Singh (cousin)

Domestic team information
- Years: Team
- 2017–present: Punjab
- 2018–2022: Mumbai Indians
- 2023–2024: Sunrisers Hyderabad
- FC debut: 3 April 2017 Punjab v Himachal Pradesh
- List A debut: 3 March 2017 Punjab v Haryana

Career statistics
Competition	FC	LA	T20
Matches	50	62	81
Runs scored	2,947	2,164	1,731
Batting average	40.93	43.28	27.47
100s/50s	7/12	6/13	1/9
Top score	267	141	113
Balls bowled	108	12	–
Wickets	1	2	–
Bowling average	54.00	7.00	–
5 wickets in innings	0	0	–
10 wickets in match	0	0	–
Best bowling	1/9	2/14	–
Catches/stumpings	47/–	15/–	43/–
- Source: ESPNcricinfo, 3 January 2026

Anmolpreet Singh (born 28 March 1998) is an Indian professional cricketer who plays for Punjab. He has made appearances in the Indian Premier League for Mumbai Indians and Sunrisers Hyderabad.

== Early life ==
Anmolpreet was born on 28 March 1998, in Patiala. He is the son of former India Handball captain Satvinder Singh.

Growing up in a household deeply rooted in sports, Anmolpreet shares familial cricket connections with his cousin, Prabhsimran Singh, and younger brother Tegpreet Singh, both carving their paths as domestic cricketers.

Anmolpreet's journey into the world of cricket commenced at the age of 5 when he would accompany his cousins to the cricket field, eagerly fetching balls for them, prompting his father to enroll him in a cricket academy in Patiala in 2005.

Coached and mentored by Munish Bali, former assistant coach of the world cup-winning India under-19 cricket team of 2008, Anmolpreet emerged as a promising talent. He set records with the Punjab under-14 and under-16 sides. Notably, he showcased his skill by amassing over 1000 runs at the under-19 level in the Cooch Behar Trophy for two consecutive years.

== Career ==
Anmolpreet played two matches in the 2014–15 season of Syed Mushtaq Ali Trophy for Punjab and three matches in the 2015 India Under-19 Tri-Nation tournament. In December 2015 he was named in India's squad for the 2016 Under-19 Cricket World Cup.

He made his first-class debut for Punjab in the 2017–18 Ranji Trophy on 6 October 2017. In November 2017, in his third first-class match, he scored 267 runs in the first innings for Punjab against Chhattisgarh. He was the leading run-scorer for Punjab in the 2017–18 Ranji Trophy, with 753 runs in five matches.

In July 2018, Anmolpreet was named in the squad for India Blue for the 2018–19 Duleep Trophy. In October 2018, he was named in India A's squad for the 2018–19 Deodhar Trophy. His consistent performances in the Deodhar Trophy resulted in his call-up to the India A limited-overs squad for their tour of New Zealand.

In August 2019, Anmolpreet was named in the India Blue team's squad for the 2019–20 Duleep Trophy. In October 2019, he was named in India C's squad for the 2019–20 Deodhar Trophy.

=== Indian Premier League ===
In December 2018, he was bought by the Mumbai Indians in the player auction for the 2019 Indian Premier League. He made his Indian Premier League debut on 19 September 2021 against Chennai Super Kings. In February 2022, he was bought by the Mumbai Indians in the auction for the 2022 Indian Premier League tournament. He was bought by Sunrisers Hyderabad in the 2023 Indian Premier League auction for Rs.20 Lakh.
