= Faiz Fazal =

Indian cricketer (born 1985)

Personal information
- Full name: Faiz Yakub Fazal
- Born: 7 September 1985 (age 41); Nagpur, Maharashtra, India
- Batting: Left-handed
- Bowling: Right-arm medium
- Role: Opening batsman

International information
- National side: India
- Only ODI (cap 214): 15 June 2016 v Zimbabwe
- ODI shirt no.: 24

Domestic team information
- Years: Team
- 2003–2024: Vidarbha (squad no. 24)
- 2009/10–2011/12: Railways (squad no. 24)
- 2010–2011: Rajasthan Royals (squad no. 24)
- 2019–: Lisburn Cricket Club (squad no. 24)

Career statistics
Competition	ODI	FC	LA	T20
Matches	1	138	113	66
Runs scored	55	9,184	3,641	1,273
Batting average	-	41.00	35.00	20.86
100s/50s	0/1	24/39	5/13	0/4
Top score	55*	206	129*	66
Balls bowled	–	2,109	626	162
Wickets	–	23	7	11
Bowling average	–	46.34	73.42	17.72
5 wickets in innings	–	0	0	0
10 wickets in match	–	0	0	0
Best bowling	–	4/42	2/41	2/17
Catches/stumpings	0/–	135/–	41/–	31/–
- Source: ESPNcricinfo, 19 February 2024

Faiz Yakub Fazal (born 7 September 1985) is an Indian former cricketer who played for Vidarbha in India, and Lisburn Cricket Club in Northern Ireland. He has previously played for Central Zone, India Red, India Under-19s, Railways, and Rajasthan Royals. He was a left-handed opening batsman.

In the 2015–16 Deodhar Trophy, Fazal scored a 112-ball 100 for India A in the final against India B. He scored 127 for Rest of India in their successful run-chase of 480 against Mumbai in the 2015–16 Irani Cup.

On 23 May 2016, he was selected in India's squad for their tour of Zimbabwe in June for three One Day Internationals (ODIs) and three Twenty20 Internationals (T20Is). He made his ODI debut on 15 June 2016, scoring 55 not out against Zimbabwe in his only international ODI appearance. Under his captaincy, Vidharbha won its maiden Ranji Trophy title, in the 2017–18 season. He was the team's top scorer, with 912 runs at an average of 70.15.

In July 2018, he was named as the captain of the India Blue team for the 2018–19 Duleep Trophy. In August 2019, he was named as the captain of the India Green team for the 2019–20 Duleep Trophy.

Fazal announced his retirement from professional cricket in February 2024. He retired with most First-class and List A runs for Vidarbha.
