= Akshay Wadkar =

Indian cricketer (born 1994)

Personal information
- Full name: Akshay Vinod Wadkar
- Born: 9 July 1994 (age 32); Nagpur, Maharashtra, India
- Batting: Right-handed
- Role: Wicket-keeper batsman

Domestic team information
- Years: Team
- 2013–present: Vidarbha

Career statistics
Competition	FC	LA	T20
Matches	61	47	28
Runs scored	3,865	1,104	570
Batting average	48.92	35.61	23.75
100s/50s	11/19	0/5	0/2
Top score	146*	82*	63
Catches/stumpings	137/23	43/13	14/1
- Source: ESPNcricinfo, 1 April 2025

Akshay Wadkar (born 9 July 1994) is an Indian cricketer. He made his first-class debut for Vidarbha in the 2017–18 Ranji Trophy on 17 November 2017. On 31 December 2017, in the final of the tournament, he scored his maiden first-class century, batting for Vidarbha against Delhi.

In July 2018, he was named in India Red's squad for the 2018–19 Duleep Trophy, replacing Abhishek Gupta. In August 2019, he was named in the India Green team's squad for the 2019–20 Duleep Trophy.
