= Ankit Rajpoot =

Indian cricketer (born 1993)

Personal information
- Full name: Ankit Singh Rajpoot
- Born: 4 December 1993 (age 32); Kanpur, Uttar Pradesh, India
- Height: 6 ft 3 in (1.91 m)
- Batting: Right-handed
- Bowling: Right-arm medium-fast
- Role: Bowler

Domestic team information
- Years: Team
- 2012/13–2024/25: Uttar Pradesh
- 2013: Chennai Super Kings
- 2016–2017: Kolkata Knight Riders (squad no. 3)
- 2018–2019: Kings XI Punjab (squad no. 3)
- 2020: Rajasthan Royals

Career statistics
Competition	FC	LA	T20
Matches	80	50	87
Runs scored	354	97	66
Batting average	5.53	6.92	7.33
100s/50s	0/0	0/0	0/0
Top score	40	18	8
Balls bowled	14,351	2,473	1,751
Wickets	248	71	105
Bowling average	29.25	26.94	21.55
5 wickets in innings	9	1	3
10 wickets in match	1	n/a	n/a
Best bowling	6/25	5/33	5/14
Catches/stumpings	14/–	7/–	12/–
- Source: ESPNcricinfo, 9 April 2025

Ankit Singh Rajpoot (born 4 December 1993) is a former Indian cricketer who played for Uttar Pradesh in domestic cricket. He was a right-arm medium-fast bowler who made his debut during the 2012–13 Ranji Trophy. He picked 31 wickets in 7 matches in that season at an average of 18.

== Career ==
In July 2018, he was named in the squad for India Green for the 2018–19 Duleep Trophy. In December 2018, he was named in India's team for the 2018 ACC Emerging Teams Asia Cup. In August 2019, he was named in the India Green team's squad for the 2019–20 Duleep Trophy.

On 6 February 2016 Rajpoot was signed by IPL team Kolkata Knight Riders. In January 2018, he was bought by the Kings XI Punjab in the 2018 IPL auction for 3 crores. On 26 April, Rajpoot took 5 wickets for 14 runs in 4 overs in a match against the Sunrisers Hyderabad, and earned the Man of the Match award, although Punjab lost the match. It was the first five-wicket haul of the season, and also the best figures for an uncapped player in the IPL.

In January 2021, he was named as one of five net bowlers in India's Test squad for their series against England.

In February 2022, he was bought by the Lucknow Super Giants in the auction for the 2022 Indian Premier League tournament.
