= Abhimanyu Easwaran =

Indian cricketer

Personal information
- Full name: Abhimanyu Ranganathan Parameswaran Easwaran
- Born: 6 September 1995 (age 31); Dehradun, Uttarakhand, India
- Batting: Right-handed
- Bowling: Leg break Googly
- Role: Top-order batter

Domestic team information
- Years: Team
- 2013–present: Bengal

Career statistics
Competition	FC	LA	T20
Matches	112	96	41
Runs scored	8,327	4,107	1242
Batting average	47.85	46.14	38.81
100s/50s	27/36	10/24	2/6
Top score	233	149	130*
Balls bowled	216	6	0
Wickets	2	0	0
Bowling average	73.50	–	–
5 wickets in innings	0	–	–
10 wickets in match	0	–	–
Best bowling	1/20	–	–
Catches/stumpings	74/–	28/–	13/–
- Source: ESPNcricinfo, 11 February 2026

Abhimanyu Easwaran (Tamil: [abimaɳjuː iːsʋaɾan]) is an Indian cricketer who plays for Bengal. He is a right-handed opening batter. He also captained the India A, India B in Duleep Trophy and Bengal in Ranji team.

== Early life ==
Abhimanyu was born on 6 September 1995 in Dehradun to a Tamilian father and Punjabi mother. He studied in Umes Chandra College in Kolkata. In his early years, he was trained by his father Ranganathan Parameshwaran Easwaran, a chartered accountant, who had started the Abhimanyu Cricket Academy in 2008. At age 10, Abhimanyu moved to Kolkata to pursue his cricket career, where he lived with his coach Nirmal Sengupta.

== Career ==
He made his Twenty20 debut for Bengal in the 2016–17 Inter State Twenty-20 Tournament on 31 January 2017. In October 2018, he was named in India A's squad for the 2018–19 Deodhar Trophy. He was the leading run-scorer for Bengal in the 2018–19 Ranji Trophy, with 861 runs in six matches.

In August 2019, he was named in the India Red team's squad for the 2019–20 Duleep Trophy. In the final of the tournament, he scored 153 runs against India Green. In October 2019, he was named in India A's squad for the 2019–20 Deodhar Trophy.

In January 2021, he was named as one of five standby players in India's Test squad for their home series against England. In May 2021, he was also named as one of four standby players in India's Test squad for the final of the 2019–2021 ICC World Test Championship and their away series against England. In October 2024, he called up to an 18-member Indian squad to participate in the Border–Gavaskar Trophy in Australia.

== See also ==
- Abhimanyu Cricket Academy
- List of Bengal cricketers
