= Akshay Wakhare =

Indian cricketer (born 1985)

Personal information
- Full name: Akshay Anil Wakhare
- Born: 3 October 1985 (age 41); Nagpur, Maharashtra, India
- Batting: Right-handed
- Bowling: Right-arm off break
- Role: Bowler

Domestic team information
- Years: Team
- 2006/07–present: Vidarbha

Career statistics
Competition	FC	LA	T20
Matches	28	19	8
Runs scored	295	52	27
Batting average	11.34	7.42	27.00
100s/50s	0/2	0/0	0/0
Top score	72	25	25*
Balls bowled	6,612	910	144
Wickets	94	20	10
Bowling average	30.63	33.55	16.30
5 wickets in innings	8	0	0
10 wickets in match	2	0	0
Best bowling	7/70	4/35	3/31
Catches/stumpings	13/–	6/–	1/–
- Source: ESPNcricinfo, 27 March 2015

Akshay Anil Wakhare (born 3 October 1985) is an Indian cricketer who plays for Vidarbha in domestic cricket. He is a right-arm off break bowler who has represented Central Zone.

Wakhare made his first-class debut in November 2006. He came into the limelight in January 2015 when he picked 5/89 against Saurashtra and 6/92 & 7/70 against Gujarat during the 2014–15 Ranji Trophy. In February 2015, he was signed up by the Indian Premier League franchise Mumbai Indians for Rs. 10 lakh.

In July 2018, he was named in the squad for India Blue for the 2018–19 Duleep Trophy. In August 2019, he was named in the India Red team's squad for the 2019–20 Duleep Trophy. He took a five-wicket haul in the final against India Green, as India Red won the match by an innings and 38 runs.
