= Rajneesh Gurbani =

Indian cricketer

Personal information
- Full name: Rajneesh Naresh Gurbani
- Born: 28 January 1993 (age 33); Nagpur, Maharashtra, India
- Batting: Right-handed
- Bowling: Right-arm medium-fast
- Role: Bowler

Domestic team information
- Years: Team
- 2015/16–2024: Vidarbha
- 2024-present: Maharashtra
- Source: Cricinfo, 18 December 2024

Rajneesh Gurbani (born 28 January 1993) is an Indian cricketer who plays for Vidarbha.

He made his List A debut on 10 December 2015 in the 2015–16 Vijay Hazare Trophy. He made his Twenty20 debut on 3 January 2016 in the 2015–16 Syed Mushtaq Ali Trophy. He made his first-class debut for Vidarbha in the 2016–17 Ranji Trophy on 27 October 2016.

He made his Twenty20 debut on 3 January 2016, in the 2015–16 Syed Mushtaq Ali Trophy, where he took 1 for 20 in 3 overs.

In the semi-finals of the 2017–18 Ranji Trophy, he took twelve wickets in the match for Vidarbha against Karnataka, including career-best figures of 7/68 in the second innings. He won the man of the match award and Vidarbha advanced to their first final in the history of the Ranji Trophy. In the final, he took a hat-trick, becoming the second bowler to take one in the final of the Ranji Trophy. Vidarbha won the game by 9 wickets to win their first ever Ranji Trophy title, with Gurbani named as man of the match. He was the leading wicket-taker for Vidarbha in the 2017–18 Ranji Trophy, with 39 dismissals in six matches.

In July 2018, he was named in the squad for India Red for the 2018–19 Duleep Trophy. In the opening fixture of the tournament, he took 7 wickets for 81 runs, and was named the man of the match. In October 2018, he was named in India C's squad for the 2018–19 Deodhar Trophy.
