= Ganesh Satish =

Indian cricketer

Personal information
- Born: 15 March 1988 (age 38); Davanagere, Karnataka, India
- Batting: Right-handed

Domestic team information
- Years: Team
- 2008–2014: Karnataka
- 2014–present: Vidarbha
- FC debut: 3 November 2008 Karnataka v Railways
- Last FC: 12 February 2020 Vidarbha v Hyderabad
- LA debut: 26 February 2008 Karnataka v Andhra
- Last LA: 22 December 2021 Vidarbha v Saurashtra

Career statistics
| Competition | FC | LA | T20 |
|---|---|---|---|
| Matches | 98 | 86 | 52 |
| Runs scored | 6268 | 2795 | 761 |
| Batting average | 45.75 | 37.77 | 17.69 |
| 100s/50s | 15/35 | 5/18 | 0/2 |
| Top score | 237 | 140* | 54 |
| Balls bowled | 336 | 79 | 0 |
| Wickets | 4 | 3 | – |
| Bowling average | 50.25 | 29.66 | – |
| 5 wickets in innings | 0 | 0 | – |
| 10 wickets in match | 0 | 0 | – |
| Best bowling | 1/4 | 2/26 | – |
| Catches/stumpings | 47/0 | 35/0 | 12/0 |
- Source: ESPNcricinfo, 10 February 2022

Ganesh Satish (born 15 March 1988) is an Indian cricketer. He is a right-handed batsman and wicket-keeper who currently plays for Vidarbha cricket team. He was born in Davanagere, Karnataka.

Satish began his cricketing career playing for the Karnataka Under-14s team in 2001, first appearing in a game which saw teammate Vrushabendranath Pawar score 229 runs. He again played for the Under-14s the following season.

Satish continued to make it up the youth ranks, up through to the Under-22s. Satish's List A debut came in the Vijay Hazare Trophy competition of 2007–08. His debut first-class appearance came in November 2008 against Railways, partnering centurion and 2008 IPL player Robin Uthappa in the first innings and Chandrashekar Raghu in the second.

Satish represented Malnad Gladiators in the first edition of the Karnataka Premier League(2009). Satish represented his home state of Karnataka in the Ranji Trophy and captained in 2011.

In 2014, Satish switched to Vidarbha.

In July 2018, he was named in the squad for India Blue for the 2018–19 Duleep Trophy.

He has played three times in the Irani Cup.
