= Sanjay Raghunath =

Indian cricketer (born 1995)

Personal information
- Full name: Raghunath Ramaswamy Sanjay
- Born: 1 April 1995 (age 31); Varanasi, Uttar Pradesh, India
- Source: ESPNcricinfo, 30 October 2016

Sanjay Raghunath (born 1 April 1995) is an Indian cricketer. He made his first-class debut for Vidarbha in the 2014–15 Ranji Trophy on 14 December 2014. He made his List A debut for Vidarbha in the 2017–18 Vijay Hazare Trophy on 5 February 2018.

In July 2018, he was named in the squad for India Red for the 2018–19 Duleep Trophy. In the opening fixture of the tournament, he made a century, scoring 123 not out. He was the leading run-scorer for India Red in the tournament, with 267 runs in three matches.

He made his Twenty20 debut on 9 November 2021, for Vidarbha in the 2021–22 Syed Mushtaq Ali Trophy.
