= Aditya Sarwate =

Indian cricketer (born 1989)

Personal information
- Born: 10 December 1989 (age 36); Nagpur, Maharashtra, India
- Batting: Right-handed
- Bowling: Slow left-arm orthodox
- Role: Bowler
- Relatives: Chandu Sarwate (granduncle)

Domestic team information
- Years: Team
- 2015–2024: Vidarbha
- 2024–: Kerala

Career statistics
Competition	FC	LA	T20
Matches	70	40	18
Runs scored	2,175	483	4
Batting average	26.52	21.00	4.00
100s/50s	2/13	0/1	0/0
Top score	103*	58	2*
Balls bowled	13,682	2,070	321
Wickets	310	47	18
Bowling average	19.47	28.59	22.00
5 wickets in innings	21	0	0
10 wickets in match	3	0	0
Best bowling	7/121	3/18	3/28
Catches/stumpings	24/–	10/–	4/–
- Source: ESPNcricinfo, 13 February 2025

Aditya Sarwate (born 10 December 1989) is an Indian cricketer who played for Vidarbha until 2024.

He made his first-class debut on 22 October 2015 in 2015–16 Ranji Trophy. He was the leading wicket-taker for Vidarbha in the group-stage of the 2018–19 Ranji Trophy, with 38 dismissals in eight matches. In the final of the 2018–19 Ranji Trophy, Sarwate took eleven wickets in the match, and was named the Player of the Match.

In August 2019, he was named in the India Red team's squad for the 2019–20 Duleep Trophy. In 2024–25 season he moved to Kerala Ranji Trophy Team and made his debut for new team on 11 October 2024 in the match against Punjab
