= 2017–18 Ranji Trophy =

Cricket tournament

- The Ranji Trophy, awarded to the winners
- Dates: 6 October 2017 – 2 January 2018
- Administrator: BCCI
- Cricket format: First-class cricket
- Tournament format: Round-robin then knockout
- Host: India
- Champions: Vidarbha (1st title)
- Participants: 28
- Matches: 91
- Most runs: Mayank Agarwal (1,160) (Karnataka)
- Most wickets: Jalaj Saxena (44) (Kerala)

The 2017–18 Ranji Trophy was the 84th season of the Ranji Trophy, the premier first-class cricket tournament that took place in India between October 2017 and January 2018. Vidarbha won the tournament, beating Delhi by 9 wickets in the final, to win their first Ranji Trophy title. Vidarbha made their Ranji Trophy debut in the 1957–58 season, making it the third-longest wait before a team won their maiden title. Vidarbha's captain, Faiz Fazal, said that "winning the Ranji Trophy has been the biggest achievement in my career".

The previous season was played at neutral venues. For this season, the Board of Control for Cricket in India (BCCI) agreed to return to playing fixtures at home and away venues after the neutral venue trial was unpopular with domestic captains. However, the knock-out phase of the tournament was still played at neutral venues. The other change from the previous season was an increase in the number of groups from three to four, with each team playing six fixtures in the group stage. The top two teams from each group progressed to the quarter-finals.

Gujarat were the defending champions. The season started on 6 October 2017, with the quarter-finals taking place on 7 December 2017, the semi-finals on 17 December 2017, and the final being held from 29 December 2017 to 2 January 2018. The final was played at the Holkar Stadium, Indore for the second consecutive year.

In November 2017, Mumbai, the most successful team in the history of the Ranji Trophy, played their 500th match in the competition.

Following the conclusion of the sixth round of group-stage fixtures, Karnataka and Delhi from Group A and Vidarbha from Group D had all progressed to the knockout stage of the tournament. After the final group-stage matches, they were joined by Gujarat and Kerala from Group B, Madhya Pradesh and Mumbai from Group C and Bengal from Group D. It was the first time that Kerala had progressed to the quarter-finals of the Ranji Trophy.

In the quarter-finals, Karnataka beat Mumbai by an innings and 20 runs. It was only the fifth time that Mumbai had lost a match by an innings in the history of the Ranji Trophy. Defending champions Gujarat drew their match with Bengal, with Bengal progressing to the semi-finals with a first-innings lead. In the other quarter-final matches, Delhi beat Madhya Pradesh by seven wickets and Vidarbha beat Kerala by 412 runs to advance.

In the first semi-final, Delhi beat Bengal by an innings and 26 runs to reach their first final since the 2007–08 tournament. In the second semi-final, Vidarbha beat Karnataka by 5 runs to reach the final for the first time in their history.

== Player transfers ==
The following player transfers were approved ahead of the season:

Player/Coach	From	To
Piyush Chawla	Uttar Pradesh	Gujarat
Robin Uthappa	Karnataka	Saurashtra
KB Arun Karthik	Assam	Kerala
Karn Sharma	Railways	Vidarbha
Ambati Rayudu	Vidarbha	Hyderabad
Pragyan Ojha	Bengal	Hyderabad
Amit Verma	Assam	Karnataka
Balchander Anirudh	Hyderabad	Tamil Nadu
Jatin Saxena	Madhya Pradesh	Chhattisgarh
Rahul Chahar	Rajasthan	Services
Robin Bist	Himachal Pradesh	Rajasthan
Gonnabattula Chiranjeevi	Andhra Pradesh	Railways

== Teams ==
The teams were drawn in the following groups, with the groupings based on the average points for each side in the previous three years:

Group A

- Assam
- Delhi
- Hyderabad
- Karnataka
- Maharashtra
- Railways
- Uttar Pradesh

Group B

- Gujarat
- Haryana
- Jammu & Kashmir
- Jharkhand
- Kerala
- Rajasthan
- Saurashtra

Group C

- Andhra Pradesh
- Baroda
- Madhya Pradesh
- Mumbai
- Odisha
- Tamil Nadu
- Tripura

Group D

- Bengal
- Chhattisgarh
- Goa
- Himachal Pradesh
- Punjab
- Services
- Vidarbha

== Group A ==
Points table

Team	Pld	W	L	D	A	Pts	NRR
Karnataka	6	4	0	2	0	32	+0.479
Delhi	6	3	0	3	0	27	+0.333
Maharashtra	6	2	2	1	1	16	+0.084
Hyderabad	6	2	1	1	2	16	–0.156
Railways	6	2	3	1	0	14	–0.312
Uttar Pradesh	6	0	3	2	1	5	+0.508
Assam	6	0	4	2	0	2	–0.977

- Top two teams advanced to the knockout stage

== Group B ==
Points table

Team	Pld	W	L	D	A	Pts	NRR
Gujarat	6	5	0	1	0	34	+0.097
Kerala	6	5	1	0	0	31	+0.636
Saurashtra	6	3	1	2	0	26	+0.245
Jammu & Kashmir	6	1	4	1	0	9	–0.077
Haryana	6	1	4	1	0	9	–0.506
Jharkhand	6	1	4	1	0	8	–0.049
Rajasthan	6	0	2	4	0	6	–0.294

- Top two teams advanced to the knockout stage

== Group C ==
Points table

Team	Pld	W	L	D	A	Pts	NRR
Madhya Pradesh	6	3	1	2	0	21	–0.116
Mumbai	6	2	0	4	0	21	+0.228
Andhra	6	1	0	5	0	19	+0.326
Baroda	6	1	1	4	0	16	+0.508
Tamil Nadu	6	0	1	5	0	11	–0.112
Odisha	6	0	2	4	0	6	–0.648
Tripura	6	0	2	4	0	4	–0.426

- Top two teams advanced to the knockout stage

== Group D ==
Points table

Team	Pld	W	L	D	A	Pts	NRR
Vidarbha	6	4	0	2	0	31	+0.358
Bengal	6	2	1	3	0	23	+0.367
Punjab	6	2	2	2	0	18	+0.609
Himachal Pradesh	6	1	1	4	0	14	+0.300
Chhattisgarh	6	1	3	2	0	13	–0.514
Services	6	1	2	3	0	10	–0.273
Goa	6	0	2	4	0	6	–0.700

- Top two teams advanced to the knockout stage

== Knockout stage ==
The draw for the quarter-finals were made after the final group-stage match, with the following fixtures announced. The fixtures in the knockout stage of the tournament are played across five days, instead of four days in the group stage.

Quarterfinals
B1	Gujarat	224
D2	Bengal	354 & 695/6
A2	Delhi	405 & 217/3
C1	Madhya Pradesh	338 & 283
B2	Kerala	176 & 165
D1	Vidarbha	246 & 507/9d
C2	Mumbai	173 & 377
A1	Karnataka	570

Semifinals
D2	Bengal	286 & 86
A2	Delhi	398
D1	Vidarbha	185 & 313
A1	Karnataka	301 & 192

Final
A2	Delhi	295 & 280
D1	Vidarbha	547 & 32/1

=== Quarter-finals ===
7–11 December 2017
Quarter-final 1
Scorecard

Bengal	v	Gujarat
354 (111.5 overs); Abhimanyu Easwaran 129 (346); Ishwar Chaudhary 5/87 (31 overs)		224 (74.5 overs); Bhargav Merai 67 (116); Ishan Porel 3/64 (24.5 overs)
695/6 (231 overs); Writtick Chatterjee 216 (370); Ishwar Chaudhary 2/95 (35 overs)

Match drawn
Sawai Mansingh Stadium, Jaipur
Umpires: Yeshwant Barde and Jayaraman Madanagopal
Player of the match: Abhimanyu Easwaran (Bengal)

- Gujarat won the toss and elected to field.
- Writtick Chatterjee (Bengal) scored his maiden double-century in first-class cricket.

7–11 December 2017
Quarter-final 2
Scorecard

Madhya Pradesh	v	Delhi
338 (124.1 overs); Harpreet Singh 107* (200); Manan Sharma 4/46 (15.1 overs)		405 (119.4 overs); Kunal Chandela 81 (179); Mihir Hirwani 5/89 (27.4 overs)
283 (105.5 overs); Harpreet Singh 78 (126); Vikas Mishra 4/59 (31.5 overs)		217/3 (51.4 overs); Gautam Gambhir 95 (129); Ishwar Pandey 1/18 (6 overs)

Delhi won by 7 wickets
Dr. Gokaraju Liala Gangaaraju ACA Cricket Ground, Vijayawada
Umpires: Gerard Abood and Anil Dandekar
Player of the match: Harpreet Singh (Madhya Pradesh)

- Delhi won the toss and elected to field.

7–11 December 2017
Quarter-final 3
Scorecard

Vidarbha	v	Kerala
246 (105.3 overs); Akshay Wadkar 53 (147); KC Akshay 5/66 (31 overs)		176 (61.5 overs); Jalaj Saxena 40 (117); Rajneesh Gurbani 5/38 (14 overs)
507/9d (146.4 overs); Faiz Fazal 119 (209); KC Akshay 4/118 (44.4 overs)		165 (52.2 overs); Salman Nizar 64 (104); Aditya Sarwate 6/41 (16.2 overs)

Vidarbha won by 412 runs
Lalabhai Contractor Stadium, Surat
Umpires: Vineet Kulkarni and Virender Sharma
Player of the match: Rajneesh Gurbani (Vidarbha)

- Vidarbha won the toss and elected to bat.
- No play was possible before tea on day 1.

7–11 December 2017
Quarter-final 4
Scorecard

Mumbai	v	Karnataka
173 (56 overs); Dhawal Kulkarni 75 (132); Vinay Kumar 6/34 (15 overs)		570 (163.3 overs); Shreyas Gopal 150* (274); Shivam Dube 5/98 (37 overs)
377 (114.5 overs); Suryakumar Yadav 108 (180); Krishnappa Gowtham 6/104 (35.5 overs)

Karnataka won by an innings and 20 runs
Vidarbha Cricket Association Stadium, Nagpur
Umpires: Abhijit Deshmukh and Nitin Pandit
Player of the match: Vinay Kumar (Karnataka)

- Karnataka won the toss and elected to field.
- Shivam Dube and Shivam Malhotra (Mumbai) both made their first-class debuts.
- Vinay Kumar (Karnataka) took a hat-trick in the first innings and became the first captain to take a hat-trick in the knockout stage of the Ranji Trophy.
- Shivam Dube (Mumbai) took his maiden five-wicket haul in first-class cricket.

=== Semi-finals ===
17–21 December 2017
Semi-final 1
Scorecard

Bengal	v	Delhi
286 (94.2 overs); Sudip Chatterjee 83 (162); Navdeep Saini 3/55 (21 overs)		398 (117 overs); Gautam Gambhir 127 (216); Mohammed Shami 6/122 (39 overs)
86 (24.4 overs); Sudip Chatterjee 21 (32); Navdeep Saini 4/35 (12 overs)

Delhi won by an innings and 26 runs
Maharashtra Cricket Association Stadium, Pune
Umpires: Abhijit Deshmukh and Nand Kishore
Player of the match: Navdeep Saini (Delhi)

- Bengal won the toss and elected to bat.

17–21 December 2017
Semi-final 2
Scorecard

Vidarbha	v	Karnataka
185 (61.4 overs); Aditya Sarwate 47 (64); Abhimanyu Mithun 5/45 (16 overs)		301 (100.5 overs); Karun Nair 153 (287); Rajneesh Gurbani 5/94 (34 overs)
313 (84.1 overs); Ganesh Satish 81 (168); Vinay Kumar 3/71 (18.1 overs)		192 (59.1 overs); Vinay Kumar 36 (48); Rajneesh Gurbani 7/68 (23.1 overs)

Vidarbha won by 5 runs
Eden Gardens, Kolkata
Umpires: Vineet Kulkarni and Pashchim Pathak
Player of the match: Rajneesh Gurbani (Vidarbha)

- Vidarbha won the toss and elected to bat.

=== Final ===
29 December 2017–2 January 2018
Final
Scorecard

Delhi	v	Vidarbha
295 (102.5 overs); Dhruv Shorey 145 (294); Rajneesh Gurbani 6/59 (24.4 overs)		547 (163.4 overs); Akshay Wadkar 133 (262); Navdeep Saini 5/135 (36.3 overs)
280 (76 overs); Nitish Rana 64 (113); Akshay Wakhare 4/95 (28 overs)		32/1 (5 overs); Wasim Jaffer 17* (17); Kulwant Khejroliya 1/21 (3 overs)

Vidarbha won by 9 wickets
Holkar Stadium, Indore
Umpires: Anil Dandekar and Nitin Menon
Player of the match: Rajneesh Gurbani (Vidarbha)

- Vidarbha won the toss and elected to field.
- Aditya Thakare (Vidarbha) made his first-class debut.
- Rajneesh Gurbani (Vidarbha) became the second bowler to take a hat-trick in the final of the Ranji Trophy.
- Akshay Wadkar (Vidarbha) scored his maiden first-class century.
