= 2019–20 Ranji Trophy Group C =

Cricket tournament

- The Ranji Trophy, awarded to the winners
- Dates: 9 December 2019 – 15 February 2020
- Administrator: BCCI
- Cricket format: First-class cricket
- Tournament format: Round-robin
- Host: India
- Participants: 10

The 2019–20 Ranji Trophy was the 86th season of the Ranji Trophy, the first-class cricket tournament that took place in India. It was contested by 38 teams, divided into four groups, with ten teams in Group C. The group stage ran from 9 December 2019 to 15 February 2020. The top two teams in Group C progressed to the quarter-finals of the competition.

Despite losing their final match, Jammu & Kashmir finished top of Group C to advance to the quarter-finals. They were joined by Odisha, who drew their final group game. Uttarakhand finished in last place in Group C and were relegated back to the Plate Group for the next season.

== Points table ==
Team	Pld	W	L	D	T	NR	Pts	Quot
Jammu & Kashmir	9	6	1	2	0	0	39	1.467
Odisha	9	5	2	2	0	0	38	1.214
Haryana	9	5	2	2	0	0	36	1.272
Services	9	5	2	2	0	0	36	1.042
Maharashtra	9	5	3	1	0	0	34	1.105
Jharkhand	9	3	3	3	0	0	24	0.916
Chhattisgarh	9	2	2	5	0	0	23	1.342
Assam	9	1	4	4	0	0	15	0.714
Tripura	9	0	6	3	0	0	9	0.820
Uttarakhand	9	0	7	2	0	0	2	0.536

- Top two teams advances to the knockout stage and are promoted to the Elite Groups A and B for the next season.
- Bottom ranked team is relegated to the Plate Group for the next season.

== Fixtures ==
=== Round 1 ===
9–12 December 2019
Scorecard

Chhattisgarh	v	Odisha
134 (52.2 overs); Ajay Mandal 47 (69); Rajesh Mohanty 6/47 (18 overs)		215 (76.4 overs); Sujit Lenka 56 (117); Puneet Datey 4/58 (22 overs)
78 (36.4 overs); Ashutosh Singh 43 (96); Rajesh Mohanty 4/19 (11.4 overs)

Odisha won by an innings and 3 runs
Shaheed Veer Narayan Singh International Stadium, Raipur
Umpires: K. N. Ananthapadmanabhan and Krishnamachari Srinivasan
Player of the match: Rajesh Mohanty (Odisha)

- Odisha won the toss and elected to field.
- Shashank Singh (Chhattisgarh) made his first-class debut.

9–12 December 2019
Scorecard

Haryana	v	Maharashtra
401 (124.2 overs); Shubham Rohilla 142 (285); Anupam Sanklecha 4/82 (26.2 overs)		247 (96 overs); Naushad Shaikh 60 (151); Harshal Patel 4/70 (29 overs)
		86 (29 overs) (f/o); Naushad Shaikh 27 (46); Harshal Patel 5/22 (8 overs)

Haryana won by an innings and 68 runs
Chaudhary Bansi Lal Cricket Stadium, Rohtak
Umpires: Saiyed Khalid and Sadashiv Iyer
Player of the match: Harshal Patel (Haryana)

- Haryana won the toss and elected to bat.
- Sumit Kumar, Aman Kumar (Haryana), Azim Kazi and Avdhoot Dandekar (Maharashtra) all made their first-class debuts.

9–12 December 2019
Scorecard

Jammu & Kashmir	v	Uttarakhand
182 (49.2 overs); Shubham Khajuria 47 (60); Rahil Shah 3/18 (8.2 overs)		84 (31 overs); Dikshanshu Negi 24* (45); Mohammed Mudhasir 5/13 (11 overs)
304 (65.4 overs); Fazil Rashid 73* (114); Rahil Shah 5/74 (18.4 overs)		149 (46 overs); Dikshanshu Negi 55* (46); Ram Dayal 5/58 (16 overs)

Jammu & Kashmir won by 253 runs
Abhimanyu Cricket Academy, Dehradun
Umpires: Kamlesh Sharma and Sivasubramaniyan Shankar
Player of the match: Ram Dayal (Jammu & Kashmir)

- Uttarakhand won the toss and elected to field.
- Pradeep Chamoli, Dikshanshu Negi, Arya Sethi (Uttarakhand), Abdul Samad and Abid Mushtaq (Jammu & Kashmir) all made their first-class debuts.

9–12 December 2019
Scorecard

Services	v	Assam
124 (52.1 overs); Vikas Hathwala 34* (46); Arup Das 4/39 (14 overs)		162 (64.2 overs); Riyan Parag 66 (157); Diwesh Pathania 5/58 (21.2 overs)
272 (94.1 overs); Rajat Paliwal 89 (190); Arup Das 5/44 (23.1 overs)		74/5 (31 overs); Swarupam Purkayastha 18* (30); Sachidanand Pandey 2/7 (12 overs)

Match drawn
Barsapara Cricket Stadium, Guwahati
Umpires: Vinod Seshan and Saurabh Dhote

- Assam won the toss and elected to field.
- No play was possible on day four due to protests over the Citizenship Amendment Act.

9–12 December 2019
Scorecard

Tripura	v	Jharkhand
289 (81.2 overs); Milind Kumar 59 (92); Ashish Kumar 3/40 (17.2 overs)		136 (43 overs); Virat Singh 47 (81); Rana Dutta 4/42 (12 overs)
211 (64.4 overs); Manisankar Murasingh 103 (145); Ashish Kumar 5/67 (18.4 overs)		418/8d (108 overs) (f/o); Saurabh Tiwary 122* (190); Manisankar Murasingh 3/97 (27 overs)

Jharkhand won by 54 runs
Maharaja Bir Bikram College Stadium, Agartala
Umpires: Abhijit Bengeri and Navdeep Singh
Player of the match: Saurabh Tiwary (Jharkhand)

- Jharkhand won the toss and elected to field.
- Bikramkumar Das (Tripura), Vivekanand Tiwari and Arnav Sinha (Jharkhand) all made their first-class debuts.

=== Round 2 ===
17–20 December 2019
Scorecard

Uttarakhand	v	Chhattisgarh
120 (37.5 overs); Dikshanshu Negi 29 (55); Ajay Mandal 3/17 (3 overs)		520/7d (135.2 overs); Ajay Mandal 241* (301); Pradeep Chamoli 4/95 (24.2 overs)
335 (132.4 overs); Dikshanshu Negi 69 (161); Ajay Mandal 5/60 (37 overs)

Chhattisgarh won by an innings and 65 runs
Shaheed Veer Narayan Singh International Stadium, Raipur
Umpires: K. N. Ananthapadmanabhan and Krishnamachari Srinivasan
Player of the match: Ajay Mandal (Chhattisgarh)

- Uttarakhand won the toss and elected to bat.
- Gaurav Singh (Uttarakhand) made his first-class debut.

17–20 December 2019
Scorecard

Tripura	v	Haryana
63 (19.4 overs); Tanmay Mishra 29 (47); Harshal Patel 7/29 (9.4 overs)		242 (63.2 overs); Chaitanya Bishnoi 67 (101); Manisankar Murasingh 5/64 (21.2 overs)
49 (16.3 overs); Saurabh Das 10* (9); Ashish Hooda 5/21 (8 overs)

Haryana won by an innings and 125 runs
Chaudhary Bansi Lal Cricket Stadium, Rohtak
Umpires: Vinod Seshan and Nand Kishore
Player of the match: Harshal Patel (Haryana)

- Haryana won the toss and elected to field.
- Prashant Kumar (Haryana) made his first-class debut.

17–20 December 2019
Scorecard

Jammu & Kashmir	v	Maharashtra
209 (63.5 overs); Ahmed Banday 76 (149); Anupam Sanklecha 4/56 (15 overs)		109 (41.1 overs); Murtaza Trunkwala 31 (54); Umar Nazir 5/30 (13.1 overs)
263 (71.3 overs); Suryansh Raina 83 (150); Digvijay Deshmukh 4/46 (14.3 overs)		309 (86.1 overs); Digvijay Deshmukh 83 (71); Mohammed Mudhasir 4/84 (25.1 overs)

Jammu & Kashmir won by 54 runs
Maharashtra Cricket Association Stadium, Pune
Umpires: Rajeev Godara and Rajesh Timaney
Player of the match: Umar Nazir (Jammu & Kashmir)

- Maharashtra won the toss and elected to field.
- Digvijay Deshmukh (Maharashtra) made his first-class debut.

17–20 December 2019
Scorecard

Services	v	Odisha
271 (66.1 overs); Rajat Paliwal 58 (87); Basant Mohanty 6/69 (20 overs)		540 (160.2 overs); Debasish Samantray 195 (403); Arun Bamal 4/116 (33.2 overs)
238 (81.1 overs); Vikas Hathwala 71 (97); Rajesh Mohanty 3/44 (17 overs)

Odisha won by an innings and 31 runs
DRIEMS Ground, Cuttack
Umpires: Puttarangaiah Jayapal and VM Dhokre
Player of the match: Debasish Samantray (Odisha)

- Odisha won the toss and elected to field.

17–20 December 2019
Scorecard

Assam	v	Jharkhand
162 (56.5 overs); Riyan Parag 55 (92); Anukul Roy 4/28 (10.5 overs)		415/9d (99.2 overs); Nazim Siddiqui 173 (217); Mukhtar Hussain 2/48 (16 overs)
186 (62.4 overs); Kunal Saikia 48 (62); Shahbaz Nadeem 5/53 (19 overs)

Jharkhand won by an innings and 67 runs
JSCA International Stadium Complex, Ranchi
Umpires: C. K. Nandan and Sundaram Ravi

- Assam won the toss and elected to bat.
- Sidharth Sarmah (Assam) and Pankaj Kumar (Jharkhand) both made their first-class debuts.

=== Round 3 ===
25–28 December 2019
Scorecard

Haryana	v	Jharkhand
371 (113.3 overs); Chaitanya Bishnoi 107* (196); Ashish Kumar 4/69 (25 overs)		408/5 (119.1 overs); Kumar Deobrat 161 (308); Amit Rana 2/71 (23.1 overs)

Match drawn
Keenan Stadium, Jamshedpur
Umpires: K. N. Ananthapadmanabhan and Krishnamachari Srinivasan
Player of the match: Kumar Deobrat (Jharkhand)

- Haryana won the toss and elected to bat.

25–28 December 2019
Scorecard

Maharashtra	v	Chhattisgarh
289 (95.4 overs); Ruturaj Gaikwad 108 (199); Veer Pratap Singh 5/80 (25 overs)		286 (111 overs); Harpreet Singh 90 (180); Chirag Khurana 3/64 (23 overs)
149/3d (69 overs); Ruturaj Gaikwad 76 (170); Sumit Ruikar 2/44 (19 overs)

Match drawn
Maharashtra Cricket Association Stadium, Pune
Umpires: Tapan Sharma and Madanagopal Kuppuraj
Player of the match: Ruturaj Gaikwad (Maharashtra)

- Maharashtra won the toss and elected to bat.

25–28 December 2019
Scorecard

Uttarakhand	v	Odisha
117 (48.4 overs); Dikshanshu Negi 36 (68); Basant Mohanty 6/17 (19.4 overs)		253 (83.5 overs); Shantanu Mishra 110 (245); Sunny Rana 3/45 (16 overs)
195 (52.1 overs); Dhanraj Sharma 50 (33); Suryakant Pradhan 5/63 (15 overs)		63/0 (21.4 overs); Shantanu Mishra 29* (57)

Odisha won by 10 wickets
DRIEMS Ground, Cuttack
Umpires: Sanjay Kumar Singh and Krishnaraj Srinath
Player of the match: Shantanu Mishra (Odisha)

- Odisha won the toss and elected to field.
- Akash Madhwal (Uttarakhand) made his first-class debut.

25–28 December 2019
Scorecard

Tripura	v	Services
125 (48.4 overs); Nirupam Sen 54 (112); Diwesh Pathania 5/36 (18.4 overs)		173 (53.3 overs); Arjun Sharma 54 (93); Manisankar Murasingh 7/63 (21 overs)
84 (43.5 overs); Tanmay Mishra 25 (60); Poonam Poonia 5/26 (7.5 overs)		41/2 (11.1 overs); Abhijit Salvi 23* (37); Manisankar Murasingh 1/10 (6 overs)

Services won by 8 wickets
Palam A Stadium, New Delhi
Umpires: Akshay Totre and C. K. Nandan
Player of the match: Diwesh Pathania (Services)

- Services won the toss and elected to field.
- Arjun Sharma and Abhijit Salvi (Services) both made their first-class debuts.

25–28 December 2019
Scorecard

Jammu & Kashmir	v	Assam
460/5d (94 overs); Shubham Khajuria 138 (180); Roshan Alam 3/109 (18 overs)		82/2 (29 overs); Gokul Sharma 36* (42); Mohammed Mudhasir 2/40 (12 overs)

Match drawn
Gandhi Memorial Science College Ground, Jammu
Umpires: GS Ananth Ramakrishnan and Navdeep Singh
Player of the match: Shubham Khajuria (Jammu & Kashmir)

- Assam won the toss and elected to field.
- Henan Nazir (Jammu & Kashmir) and Saahil Jain (Assam) both made their first-class debuts.

=== Round 4 ===
3–6 January 2020
Scorecard

Jharkhand	v	Jammu & Kashmir
259 (84 overs); Saurabh Tiwary 81 (174); Abid Mushtaq 5/56 (21 overs)		441 (87.4 overs); Abdul Samad 128 (75); Varun Aaron 3/69 (17.4 overs)
155 (54.4 overs); Ishank Jaggi 34 (96); Auqib Nabi 5/38 (10.4 overs)

Jammu and Kashmir won by an innings and 27 runs
JSCA International Stadium Complex, Ranchi
Umpires: Saurabh Dhote and Madanagopal Kuppuraj
Player of the match: Abdul Samad (Jammu & Kashmir)

- Jharkhand won the toss and elected to bat.
- Auqib Nabi (Jammu & Kashmir) made his first-class debut.

3–6 January 2020
Scorecard

Maharashtra	v	Services
44 (30.2 overs); Chirag Khurana 14 (47); Poonam Poonia 5/11 (10.2 overs)		285 (95.2 overs); Ravi Chauhan 65 (180); Manoj Ingale 5/73 (26 overs)
147 (48.1 overs); Naushad Shaikh 41 (94); Sachidanand Pandey 5/56 (20 overs)

Services won by an innings and 94 runs
Palam A Stadium, New Delhi
Umpires: Pranav Joshi and Sadashiv Iyer
Player of the match: Sachidanand Pandey (Services)

- Maharashtra won the toss and elected to bat.
- Manoj Ingale (Maharashtra) made his first-class debut.

3–6 January 2020
Scorecard

Assam	v	Uttarakhand
294 (116.5 overs); Riyan Parag 123 (256); Sunny Rana 3/34 (19 overs)		121 (42 overs); Mayank Mishra 52 (61); Ranjeet Mali 6/24 (17 overs)
		83 (35.2 overs) (f/o); Unmukt Chand 41 (81); Mukhtar Hussain 6/15 (12 overs)

Assam won by an innings and 90 runs
Rajiv Gandhi International Cricket Stadium, Dehradun
Umpires: Saiyed Khalid and Navdeep Singh
Player of the match: Ranjeet Mali (Assam)

- Assam won the toss and elected to bat.
- Vijay Jethi (Uttarakhand) made his first-class debut.

3–6 January 2020
Scorecard

Tripura	v	Odisha
288/6d (82 overs); Milind Kumar 105* (152); Rajesh Mohanty 3/78 (17 overs)		121 (30.4 overs); Biplab Samantray 51 (69); Rana Dutta 5/15 (10.4 overs)
		71/1 (22 overs) (f/o); Govinda Poddar 33* (85); Rana Dutta 1/7 (5 overs)

Match drawn
Maharaja Bir Bikram College Stadium, Agartala
Umpires: Vinod Seshan and Belur Ravi
Player of the match: Manisankar Murasingh (Tripura)

- Odisha won the toss and elected to field.
- No play was possible on days 1 and 2 due to a wet outfield.
- Dwaipayan Bhattacharjee (Tripura) made his first-class debut.

3–6 January 2020
Scorecard

Haryana	v	Chhattisgarh
123 (28.4 overs); Ajit Chahal 34* (39); Pankaj Rao 3/26 (7.4 overs)		119 (35.1 overs); Vishal Kushwah 45* (53); Ajit Chahal 5/25 (9 overs)
258 (72.4 overs); Nitin Saini 55 (72); Pratap Singh 4/49 (16 overs)		173 (50.5 overs); Avnish Dhaliwal 69 (114); Sumit Kumar 3/24 (5.5 overs)

Haryana won by 89 runs
Shaheed Veer Narayan Singh International Stadium, Raipur
Umpires: Anil Dandekar and Arun Kumar Basa
Player of the match: Ajit Chahal (Chhattisgarh)

- Chhattisgarh won the toss and elected to field.
- No play was possible on day 1 due to a wet outfield.
- Shashank Chandrakar (Chhattisgarh) made his first-class debut.

=== Round 5 ===
11–14 January 2020
Scorecard

Maharashtra	v	Jharkhand
434 (172.3 overs); Azim Kazi 140 (349); Utkarsh Singh 5/130 (53 overs)		170 (73 overs); Saurabh Tiwary 62 (182); Satyajeet Bachhav 5/55 (20 overs)
48/2 (5.5 overs); Naushad Shaikh 26* (14); Rahul Shukla 2/24 (3 overs)		311 (98.1 overs) (f/o); Kumar Suraj 92 (162); Satyajeet Bachhav 4/124 (36 overs)

Maharashtra won by 8 wickets
Reliance Cricket Stadium, Nagothane
Umpires: Pashchim Pathak and C. K. Nandan
Player of the match: Azim Kazi (Maharashtra)

- Maharashtra won the toss and elected to bat.
- Yash Kshirsagar (Maharashtra) and Kumar Suraj (Jharkhand) both made their first-class debuts.

11–14 January 2020
Scorecard

Chhattisgarh	v	Assam
318 (101.3 overs); Amandeep Khare 105 (164); Ranjeet Mali 4/80 (30.3 overs)		464/9d (150 overs); Gokul Sharma 129 (350); Sumit Ruikar 3/94 (38 overs)
252/5 (74 overs); Harpreet Singh 102* (144); Riyan Parag 3/82 (18 overs)

Match drawn
Barsapara Cricket Stadium, Guwahati
Umpires: Jayaraman Madanagopal and Vinod Seshan
Player of the match: Gokul Sharma (Assam)

- Assam won the toss and elected to field.
- Subham Mandal (Assam) made his first-class debut.

11–14 January 2020
Scorecard

Uttarakhand	v	Tripura
90 (45 overs); Unmukt Chand 26 (51); Ajoy Sarkar 4/19 (10 overs)		279/5d (70.4 overs); Harmeet Singh 102 (143); Dikshanshu Negi 2/38 (8 overs)
148/8 (66 overs); Vijay Jethi 81* (139); Manisankar Murasingh 3/49 (25 overs)

Match drawn
Maharaja Bir Bikram College Stadium, Agartala
Umpires: Nitin Pandit and Tapan Sharma
Player of the match: Manisankar Murasingh (Tripura)

- Tripura won the toss and elected to field.
- No play was possible on day 1.

11–14 January 2020
Scorecard

Haryana	v	Odisha
90 (31 overs); Shubham Rohilla 20 (57); Suryakant Pradhan 6/36 (12 overs)		160 (61.1 overs); Biplab Samantray 52 (116); Tinu Kundu 5/25 (16 overs)
248 (86.1 overs); Shubham Rohilla 48 (114); Suryakant Pradhan 5/86 (23 overs)		182/9 (58.1 overs); Rajesh Dhuper 32 (89); Ajit Chahal 7/80 (22 overs)

Odisha won by 1 wicket
Chaudhary Bansi Lal Cricket Stadium, Rohtak
Umpires: Pranav Joshi and VM Dhokre
Player of the match: Suryakant Pradhan (Odisha)

- Haryana won the toss and elected to bat.
- Vipin Kumar (Haryana) made his first-class debut.

11–14 January 2020
Scorecard

Jammu & Kashmir	v	Services
360 (93.1 overs); Parvez Rasool 182 (178); Diwesh Pathania 4/103 (31 overs)		242 (77.5 overs); Arun Bamal 48 (87); Mohammed Mudhasir 3/38 (19 overs)
201/5d (66 overs); Shubham Pundir 102* (186); Diwesh Pathania 3/55 (20 overs)		146 (72.2 overs); Arjun Sharma 54 (139); Parvez Rasool 3/23 (16 overs)

Jammu & Kashmir won by 173 runs
Palam A Stadium, New Delhi
Umpires: Saurabh Dhote and Sadashiv Iyer
Player of the match: Parvez Rasool (Jammu & Kashmir)

- Services won the toss and elected to field.

=== Round 6 ===
19–22 January 2020
Scorecard

Odisha	v	Jammu & Kashmir
161 (64.3 overs); Subhranshu Senapati 42 (76); Auqib Nabi 5/39 (18.3 overs)		124 (45 overs); Shubham Khajuria 40 (103); Basant Mohanty 4/42 (17 overs)
166 (67.3 overs); Shantanu Mishra 26 (69); Umar Nazir Mir 5/72 (18.3 overs)		205/6 (65.3 overs); Suryansh Raina 69 (151); Debabrata Pradhan 4/48 (15 overs)

Jammu & Kashmir won by 4 wickets
Barabati Stadium, Cuttack
Umpires: Abhijit Bengeri and Belur Ravi
Player of the match: Auqib Nabi (Jammu & Kashmir)

- Jammu & Kashmir won the toss and elected to field.

19–22 January 2020
Scorecard

Haryana	v	Services
176 (58.1 overs); Rohit Sharma 57 (87); Diwesh Pathania 5/65 (18.1 overs)		97 (24.5 overs); Rahul Singh 24 (32); Harshal Patel 6/52 (12.5 overs)
133 (50.1 overs); Ankit Kumar 35 (66); Sachidanand Pandey 4/54 (18 overs)		215/9 (61.1 overs); Rahul Singh 115 (155); Ashish Hooda 3/60 (19 overs)

Services won by 1 wicket
Palam A Stadium, New Delhi
Umpires: Akshay Totre and Tapan Sharma
Player of the match: Rahul Singh (Services)

- Services won the toss and elected to field.

19–22 January 2020
Scorecard

Maharashtra	v	Assam
175 (43.4 overs); Ankit Bawne 75 (94); Ranjeet Mali 4/55 (16 overs)		244 (78.1 overs); Rishav Das 94 (170); Satyajeet Bachhav 4/44 (24.1 overs)
365/9d (111.3 overs); Jay Pande 130 (272); Ranjeet Mali 5/123 (38.3 overs)		78 (29.5 overs); Saahil Jain 19 (30); Ashay Palkar 6/42 (13.5 overs)

Maharashtra won by 218 runs
Barsapara Cricket Stadium, Guwahati
Umpires: Sadashiv Iyer and VM Dhokre
Player of the match: Jay Pande (Maharashtra)

- Assam won the toss and elected to field.

19–22 January 2020
Scorecard

Tripura	v	Chhattisgarh
53 (18.1 overs); Rajat Dey 20 (24); Pankaj Rao 5/11 (7 overs)		225 (76.1 overs); Shashank Singh 73 (123); Abhijit Sarkar 3/57 (17 overs)
144 (42 overs); Pallab Das 76* (122); Veer Pratap Singh 5/53 (14 overs)

Chhattisgarh won by an innings and 28 runs
Shaheed Veer Narayan Singh International Stadium, Raipur
Umpires: Pranav Joshi and Saurabh Dhote
Player of the match: Veer Pratap Singh (Chhattisgarh)

- Chhattisgarh won the toss and elected to field.
- Pallab Das (Tripura) made his first-class debut.

19–22 January 2020
Scorecard

Uttarakhand	v	Jharkhand
227 (53.2 overs); Saurabh Rawat 66 (70); Ajay Yadav 6/55 (17.2 overs)		298 (87 overs); Kumar Deobrat 85 (132); Mayank Mishra 5/100 (23 overs)
273 (77.2 overs); Saurabh Rawat 110 (190); Ashish Kumar 5/61 (17 overs)		203/4 (48.4 overs); Kumar Deobrat 93* (157); Dikshanshu Negi 2/31 (4.4 overs)

Jharkhand won by 6 wickets
JSCA International Stadium Complex, Ranchi
Umpires: Vinod Seshan and Navdeep Singh
Player of the match: Ashish Kumar (Jharkhand)

- Jharkhand won the toss and elected to field.
- Harshit Bisht (Uttarakhand) made his first-class debut.

=== Round 7 ===
27–30 January 2020
Scorecard

Tripura	v	Maharashtra
121 (38 overs); Manisankar Murasingh 24 (32); Manoj Ingale 6/34 (12 overs)		208 (64.2 overs); Vishant More 78* (153); Manisankar Murasingh 3/46 (20.2 overs)
290 (90 overs); Pallab Das 77 (162); Ashay Palkar 5/62 (22 overs)		205/5 (55.5 overs); Ankit Bawne 61* (127); Rana Dutta 3/38 (14 overs)

Maharashtra won by 5 wickets
Maharaja Bir Bikram College Stadium, Agartala
Umpires: Krishnaraj Srinath and Tapan Sharma

- Maharashtra won the toss and elected to field.
- Atharva Kale (Maharashtra) made his first-class debut.

27–30 January 2020
Scorecard

Chhattisgarh	v	Jammu & Kashmir
270/4d (90 overs); Harpreet Singh 116 (196); Abdul Samad 1/18 (4 overs)		168 (32.1 overs); Abdul Samad 33 (30); Sumit Ruikar 4/82 (14 overs)

Match drawn
Gandhi Memorial Science College Ground, Jammu
Umpires: Ulhas Gandhe and Abhijit Deshmukh
Player of the match: Harpreet Singh (Chhattisgarh)

- Chhattisgarh won the toss and elected to bat.
- No play was possible on days 2 and 3.

27–30 January 2020
Scorecard

Odisha	v	Assam
436 (136.3 overs); Debabrata Pradhan 79 (125); Arup Das 4/101 (35.3 overs)		238 (82.2 overs); Ranjeet Mali 59 (68); Debabrata Pradhan 4/39 (13.2 overs)
		195 (65.4 overs) (f/o); Subham Mandal 74 (174); Rajesh Mohanty 4/30 (10.4 overs)

Odisha won by an innings and 3 runs
DRIEMS Ground, Cuttack
Umpires: Amit Bansal and Somnath Jha
Player of the match: Debabrata Pradhan (Odisha)

- Assam won the toss and elected to field.

27–30 January 2020
Scorecard

Services	v	Jharkhand
279 (83.1 overs); Raushan Raj 75 (131); Rahul Shukla 7/106 (27.1 overs)		153 (53 overs); Sumit Kumar 38 (65); Diwesh Pathania 4/51 (21 overs)
259/8d (73 overs); Rahul Singh 82 (59); Utkarsh Singh 2/36 (14 overs)		267 (87.2 overs); Kumar Suraj 103 (141); Pulkit Narang 6/58 (24.2 overs)

Services won by 118 runs
Palam A Stadium, New Delhi
Umpires: K. N. Ananthapadmanabhan and Navdeep Singh
Player of the match: Pulkit Narang (Services)

- Jharkhand won the toss and elected to field.
- Sahil Raj (Jharkhand) made his first-class debut.

27–30 January 2020
Scorecard

Uttarakhand	v	Haryana
109 (42 overs); Vijay Jethi 20 (31); Tinu Kundu 3/49 (12 overs)		142 (43.2 overs); Harshal Patel 50 (42); Agrim Tiwari 6/47 (17 overs)
109/3 (32 overs); Saurabh Rawat 30 (58); Ajit Chahal 1/17 (4 overs)

Match drawn
Rajiv Gandhi International Cricket Stadium, Dehradun
Umpires: Abhijit Bengeri and Belur Ravi
Player of the match: Agrim Tiwari (Uttarakhand)

- Uttarakhand won the toss and elected to bat.
- No play was possible on days 2 and 3.
- Harman Singh and Agrim Tiwari (Uttarakhand) both made their first-class debuts.

=== Round 8 ===
4–7 February 2020
Scorecard

Jammu & Kashmir	v	Tripura
329 (95.5 overs); Abid Mushtaq 76* (88); Manisankar Murasingh 4/100 (27 overs)		187 (60.5 overs); Milind Kumar 55 (90); Parvez Rasool 7/45 (18.5 overs)
306/9d (65.2 overs); Shubham Khajuria 76 (112); Manisankar Murasingh 6/64 (15 overs)		119 (36.2 overs); Manisankar Murasingh 58 (78); Parvez Rasool 5/28 (14 overs)

Jammu & Kashmir won by 329 runs
Maharaja Bir Bikram College Stadium, Agartala
Umpires: Akshay Totre and Belur Ravi
Player of the match: Parvez Rasool (Jammu & Kashmir)

- Tripura won the toss and elected to field.
- Jiyaad Magrey (Jammu & Kashmir) made his first-class debut.

4–7 February 2020
Scorecard

Assam	v	Haryana
97 (37 overs); Rajjakuddin Ahmed 35 (34); Tinu Kundu 5/35 (11.3 overs)		198 (46.3 overs); Rohit Sharma 59 (84); Ranjeet Mali 3/34 (8.3 overs)
197 (56.5 overs); Saahil Jain 63 (101); Harshal Patel 4/49 (10.5 overs)		100/3 (20 overs); Ankit Kumar 30 (30); Sidharth Sarmah 2/33 (7 overs)

Haryana won by 7 wickets
Chaudhary Bansi Lal Cricket Stadium, Rohtak
Umpires: Ulhas Gandhe and Virender Sharma
Player of the match: Harshal Patel (Haryana)

- Haryana won the toss and elected to field.

4–7 February 2020
Scorecard

Chhattisgarh	v	Jharkhand
559 (160.3 overs); Harpreet Singh 221 (402); Sahil Raj 3/83 (31 overs)		242 (75 overs); Virat Singh 140 (197); Veer Pratap Singh 3/46 (12 overs)
		51/0 (14 overs) (f/o); Arnav Sinha 31* (37)

Match drawn
Keenan Stadium, Jamshedpur
Umpires: Arun Kumar Basa and VM Dhokre
Player of the match: Harpreet Singh (Chhattisgarh)

- Chhattisgarh won the toss and elected to bat.

4–7 February 2020
Scorecard

Odisha	v	Maharashtra
293 (101.1 overs); Rajesh Dhuper 110* (152); Ashay Palkar 4/81 (29 overs)		543/5d (149.5 overs); Ankit Bawne 204* (406); Suryakant Pradhan 2/92 (29.5 overs)
289 (86.1 overs); Govinda Poddar 118 (187); Satyajeet Bachhav 4/80 (24.1 overs)		40/0 (11 overs); Rahul Tripathi 21* (32)

Maharashtra won by 10 wickets
Maharashtra Cricket Association Stadium, Pune
Umpires: Pranav Joshi and Saurabh Dhote
Player of the match: Ankit Bawne (Maharashtra)

- Maharashtra won the toss and elected to field.

4–7 February 2020
Scorecard

Uttarakhand	v	Services
83 (25.4 overs); Dikshanshu Negi 21* (44); Raushan Raj 3/27 (9 overs)		173 (52.2 overs); Rahul Singh 45 (62); Mayank Mishra 6/48 (17 overs)
137 (58.1 overs); Tanmay Srivastava 52 (137); Raushan Raj 3/11 (6.1 overs)		48/0 (17.4 overs); Shamsher Yadav 24* (48)

Services won by 10 wickets
Abhimanyu Cricket Academy, Dehradun
Umpires: Navdeep Singh and Subrat Das
Player of the match: Raushan Raj (Services)

- Services won the toss and elected to field.

=== Round 9 ===
12–15 February 2020
Scorecard

Chhattisgarh	v	Services
179 (52.1 overs); Amandeep Khare 97 (124); Raushan Raj 4/53 (12.1 overs)		398 (107 overs); Rahul Singh 115 (141); Puneet Datey 5/60 (21 overs)
586/3 (145.4 overs); Jiwanjot Singh 236 (357); Sachidanand Pandey 1/78 (24 overs)

Match drawn
Shaheed Veer Narayan Singh International Stadium, Raipur
Umpires: Sivasubramaniyan Shankar and Anil Chaudhary
Player of the match: Rahul Singh (Services)

- Services won the toss and elected to field.

12–15 February 2020
Scorecard

Jammu & Kashmir	v	Haryana
340 (87 overs); Shubham Pundir 84 (183); Rahul Tewatia 7/98 (22 overs)		291 (89.1 overs); Pramod Chandila 119 (216); Mujtaba Yousuf 6/49 (12.1 overs)
174 (50.1 overs); Suryansh Raina 38 (69); Jayant Yadav 7/58 (24.1 overs)		227/8 (80.4 overs); Rohit Sharma 75* (141); Parvez Rasool 5/72 (33 overs)

Haryana won by 2 wickets
Gandhi Memorial Science College Ground, Jammu
Umpires: Saiyed Khalid and Sadashiv Iyer
Player of the match: Rohit Sharma (Haryana)

- Jammu & Kashmir won the toss and elected to bat.
- Mujtaba Yousuf (Jammu & Kashmir), Harshit Saini and Yashu Sharma (Haryana) all made their first-class debuts.

12–15 February 2020
Scorecard

Maharashtra	v	Uttarakhand
207 (49.4 overs); Ashay Palkar 60 (77); Agrim Tiwari 3/52 (12.4 overs)		251 (79.5 overs); Kamal Singh 101 (160); Satyajeet Bachhav 4/71 (23 overs)
313 (102.3 overs); Satyajeet Bachhav 67 (83); Sunny Rana 7/43 (19.3 overs)		202 (80.3 overs); Kamal Singh 57 (163); Ashay Palkar 3/44 (25 overs)

Maharashtra won by 67 runs
Bharat Ratna Dr. Babasaheb Ambedkar Stadium, Baramati
Umpires: Jayaraman Madanagopal and Rajeev Godara
Player of the match: Kamal Singh (Uttarakhand)

- Uttarakhand won the toss and elected to field.
- Swapnil Fulpagar (Maharashtra), Kamal Singh and Ankit Manori (Uttarakhand) all made their first-class debuts.

12–15 February 2020
Scorecard

Odisha	v	Jharkhand
436 (146.2 overs); Debasish Samantray 156 (349); Ashish Kumar 6/79 (31.2 overs)		356 (109 overs); Kumar Suraj 107 (137); Basant Mohanty 3/53 (27 overs)
187/1d (51 overs); Subhranshu Senapati 100* (157); Ashish Kumar 1/40 (11 overs)

Match drawn
Barabati Stadium, Cuttack
Umpires: Vinod Seshan and VM Dhokre
Player of the match: Debasish Samantray (Odisha)

- Jharkhand won the toss and elected to field.
- Ankit Yadav (Odisha) made his first-class debut.

12–15 February 2020
Scorecard

Tripura	v	Assam
497 (117.4 overs); Manisankar Murasingh 118 (152); Ranjeet Mali 5/114 (30.4 overs)		283 (106.1 overs); Rishav Das 132 (283); Harmeet Singh 6/110 (35 overs)
166/7d (40.1 overs); Milind Kumar 69 (88); Mukhtar Hussain 3/69 (16 overs)		180/5 (60 overs); Riyan Parag 43 (96); Manisankar Murasingh 3/63 (18 overs)

Match drawn
Barsapara Cricket Stadium, Guwahati
Umpires: Sanjeev Dua and Sundaram Ravi
Player of the match: Manisankar Murasingh (Tripura)

- Assam won the toss and elected to field.
- Arkaprabha Sinha (Tripura) made his first-class debut.
