= List of Uttarakhand cricketers =

Cricketers who have played for Uttarakhand in senior matches

This is a list of all cricketers who have played in first-class, List A or Twenty20 matches for Uttarakhand, mostly in the Ranji Trophy (FC), Vijay Hazare Trophy (LA), and Syed Mushtaq Ali Trophy (T20) competitions. Seasons given are the first and last in which each player represented Uttarakhand, but they may not have played in all the interim seasons and many played for other senior teams besides Uttarakhand. Players in bold have played international cricket.

Uttarakhand made their senior debut in September 2018 when they joined the Vijay Hazare Trophy as one of ten expansion teams and played Bihar at the Shastri Maidan in Anand, Gujarat. Their first-class debut, also against Bihar, was six weeks later at the Rajiv Gandhi International Cricket Stadium, Dehradun.

Last updated 24 November 2023.

== A ==
- Iqbal Abdulla, 2020/21
- Sanyam Arora, 2021/22

== B ==
- S. Baliyan, 2022/23
- P. K. Bhati, 2023/24
- Rajat Bhatia, 2018/19
- Vaibhav Bhatt, 2018/19–2022/23
- Himanshu Bisht, 2018/19–2023/24
- Harshit Bisht, 2019/20
- Robin Bist, 2021/22–2022
- Jay Bista, 2020/21–2022

== C ==
- Pradeep Chamoli, 2019/20
- Unmukt Chand, 2019/20
- Kunal Chandela, 2020/21–2023/24
- Ashish Chaudhary, 2019/20
- Y. Chaudhary, 2023/24
- Saurav Chauhan, 2018/19

== D ==
- Rohit Dangwal, 2018/19
- Deepak Dhapola, 2018/19–2023/24

== F ==
- Samad Fallah, 2020/21

== G ==
- Tanush Gusain, 2019/20–2021/22

== J ==
- Vijay Jethi, 2018/19–2021/22
- Ashish Joshi, 2019/20
- Kartik Joshi, 2018/19
- Piyush Joshi, 2018/19–2023/24

== K ==
- Sunny Kashyap, 2018/19
- Karanveer Kaushal, 2018/19–2020/21
- P. S. Khanduri, 2022/23–2023/24
- Shivam Khurana, 2018/19–2022
- Nikhil Kohli, 2020/21–2022/23
- Rajan Kumar, 2022/23–2023/24

== M ==
- Akash Mandwaal, 2019/20–2023/24
- Ankit Manor, 2019/20–2021/22
- Mayank Mishra, 2018/19–2023/24

== N ==
- Deepesh Nainwal, 2021/22
- Mohammad Nazim, 2021/22
- A. D. Negi, 2022/23
- Dikshanshu Negi, 2019/20–2023/24
- R. Negi, 2023/24

== P ==
- P. Pandey, 2023/24
- Vaibhav Panwar, 2018/19–2019/20
- Bhiguraj Pathania, 2018/19

== R ==
- Sunny Rana, 2018/19–2020/21
- Malolan Rangarajan, 2018/19
- N. S. Rathour, 2022/23
- Girish Raturi, 2018/19–2020/21
- A. S. Rawat, 2022/23–2023/24
- Saurabh Rawat, 2018/19–2021/22

== S ==
- Shubham Saundiyal, 2018/19
- Vineet Saxena, 2018/19
- Aditya Sethi, 2019/20
- Arya Sethi, 2018/19–2020/21
- Rahil Shah, 2019/20
- A. Sharma, 2022/23
- Dhanraj Sharma, 2018/19–2019/20
- Vijay Sharma, 2018/19–2022/23
- Gaurav Singh, 2018/19–2019/20
- Harman Singh, 2019/20
- Jiwanjot Singh, 2022/23–2023/24
- Kamal Singh, 2019/20–2022/23
- Piyush Kumar Singh, 2023/24
- Swapnil Singh, 2021/22–2023/24
- Tanmay Srivastava, 2019/20
- Avneesh Sudha, 2018/19–2023/24

== T ==
- A. P. Tare, 2022/23–2023/24
- Agrim Tiwari, 2019/20–2023/24
