= 2026–27 Irani Cup =

Cricket match

| Rest of India | Jammu & Kashmir |
| 237 | 278 |
| & | & |
| 319 | 111 |
- Rest of India won by 167 run
- Date: 1–4 October 2026
- Venue: Sher-e-Kashmir Stadium, Srinagar
- Player of the match: Ravichandran Smaran (Rest of India)
- Umpires: Ulhas Gandhe and Akshay Totre

The 2026–27 Irani Cup was the 63rd edition of the Irani Trophy, a First-class cricket tournament in India, organised by the Board of Control for Cricket in India (BCCI). It was played as a one-off match between Jammu & Kashmir, the winners of the 2025–26 Ranji Trophy, and a Rest of India team.

It took place from 1 to 5 October 2026 in Srinagar. This tournament is part of the 2026 Indian domestic cricket season, announced by the BCCI in June 2026. Vidarbha were the defending champions.

== Squads ==
| Jammu & Kashmir | Rest of India |
|---|---|
| Paras Dogra (c); Yawer Hassan; Qamran Iqbal; Shubham Khajuria; Sunil Kumar; Sahil Lotra; Umar Nazir Mir; Abid Mushtaq; Lone Nasir; Shubham Pundir; Abdul Samad; Rohit Sharma; Vanshaj Sharma; Kawalpreet Singh; Kanhaiya Wadhawan (wk) | Rishabh Pant (c, wk) (DDCA); Sarfaraz Khan (vc) (MCA); Mukesh Choudhary (MHCA); Akash Deep (CAB); Ayush Doseja (DDCA); Sudip Gharami (CAB); Saransh Jain (MPCA); Aryan Juyal (wk) (UPCA); Mukesh Kumar (CAB); Shikhar Mohan (JSCA); Aryan Pandey (MPCA); Ravichandran Smaran (KSCA); Anukul Roy (JSCA); Sanat Sangwan (DDCA); Manav Suthar (RCA) |

== Match ==
1–4 October 2026
Scorecard

| Rest of India | v | Jammu & Kashmir |
| 237 (68.1 overs); Ravichandran Smaran 68 (83); Sunil Kumar 3/36 (20.1 overs) | | 278 (64.2 overs); Paras Dogra 75 (143); Mukesh Choudhary 5/78 (19 overs) |
| 319 (99.5 overs); Ravichandran Smaran 135 (153); Sunil Kumar 3/56 (28.5 overs) | | 111 (28.4 overs); Shubham Khajuria 36 (49); Mukesh Kumar 6/33 (10.4 overs) |

Rest of India won by 167 runs
Sher-e-Kashmir Stadium, Srinagar
Umpires: Ulhas Gandhe and Akshay Totre
Player of the match: Ravichandran Smaran (Rest of India)

- Jammu & Kashmir won the toss and elected to field.
