= 2022–23 Syed Mushtaq Ali Trophy Group C =

Cricket tournament

- Dates: 11 October – 5 November 2022
- Administrator(s): BCCI
- Cricket format: Twenty20 cricket
- Tournament format(s): Round-robin
- Participants: 8

The 2022–23 Syed Mushtaq Ali Trophy was the fifteenth season of the Syed Mushtaq Ali Trophy, a Twenty20 cricket tournament played in India. It was contested by 38 teams, divided into five groups, with eight teams in Group C. The tournament was announced by BCCI on 8 August 2022.

Karnataka won six of their seven matches, with Kerala winning five matches. Therefore, Karnataka advanced to the quarter-finals and Kerala progressed to the preliminary quarter-finals because of a higher net run rate than Haryana.

== Points table ==
Pos	Team	Pld	W	L	NR	Pts	NRR
1	Karnataka	7	6	1	0	24	2.216
2	Kerala	7	5	2	0	20	1.402
3	Haryana	7	5	2	0	20	1.214
4	Services	7	5	2	0	20	0.789
5	Maharashtra	7	4	3	0	16	0.515
6	Meghalaya	7	2	5	0	8	−1.846
7	Jammu and Kashmir	7	1	6	0	4	0.329
8	Arunachal Pradesh	7	0	7	0	0	−5.217

Updated to match(es) played on 22 October 2022. Source: ESPN Cricinfo

Advanced to Quarter-final
Advanced to Preliminary quarter-final

== Fixtures ==
=== Round 1 ===
11 October 2022
Scorecard

Arunachal Pradesh; 53/6 (11 overs)	v	Kerala; 55/0 (4.5 overs)
Techi Doria 18 (17); Sudhesan Midhun 2/10 (2 overs)		Rohan Kunnummal 32* (13)

Kerala won by 10 wickets
Maharaja Yadavindra Singh International Cricket Stadium, Mullanpur
Umpires: Rajeev Godara and Rajesh Timaney

- Kerala won the toss and elected to field.
- The match was reduced to 11 overs per side due to rain.
- Chetan Anand, Meet Desai, Rohan Sharma, Tanmay Gupta (Arunachal Pradesh), Abdul Basith, Krishna Prasad and Nedumankuzhy Basil (Kerala) all made their T20 debuts.

11 October 2022
Scorecard

Jammu and Kashmir; 81/3 (9 overs)	v	Meghalaya; 85/2 (7.3 overs)
Jatin Wadhwan 26 (22); Chirag Khurana 1/9 (1 over)		Puneet Bisht 51* (23); Umran Malik 1/16 (2 overs)

Meghalaya won by 8 wickets
Inderjit Singh Bindra Stadium, Mohali
Umpires: Abhijit Bhattacharya and GS Ananth Ramakrishnan

- Meghalaya won the toss and elected to field.
- The match was reduced to 9 overs per side due to rain.
- Abhishek Kumar (Meghalaya) made his T20 debut.

11 October 2022
Scorecard

Haryana; 126 (18.2 overs)	v	Services; 125/7 (20 overs)
Sumit Kumar 24 (29); Pulkit Narang 3/18 (4 overs)		Rajat Paliwal 35 (34); Rahul Tewatia 2/18 (2 overs)

Haryana won by 1 run
Maharaja Yadavindra Singh International Cricket Stadium Mullanpur
Umpires: Rajeev Godara and Rajesh Timaney

- Services won the toss and elected to field.
- Dinesh Bana, Aman Kumar, Nishant Sindhu (Haryana) and Parth Rekhade (Services) all made their T20 debuts.
- Impact Player Subs: Sumit Kumar for Ankit Kumar (Haryana) and Parth Rekhade for Nitin Yadav (Services).

11 October 2022
Scorecard

Karnataka; 215/2 (20 overs)	v	Maharashtra; 116/8 (20 overs)
Devdutt Padikkal 124* (62); Ashay Palkar 1/24 (2 overs)		Divyang Hinganekar 47 (36); Vidhwath Kaverappa 3/19 (4 overs)

Karnataka won by 99 runs
Inderjit Singh Bindra Stadium, Mohali
Umpires: Abhijit Bhattacharya and GS Ananth Ramakrishnan

- Maharashtra won the toss and elected to field.
- Vidhwath Kaverappa (Karnataka), Ramakrishna Ghosh, Pavan Shah, Kaushal Tambe and Siddhesh Veer (Maharashtra) all made their T20 debuts.
- Impact Player Subs: Shamshuzama Kazi for Ashay Palkar (Maharashtra) and Shreyas Gopal for Devdutt Padikkal (Karnataka).

=== Round 2 ===
12 October 2022
Scorecard

Haryana; 136/7 (20 overs)	v	Meghalaya; 53 (14.3 overs)
Rahul Tewatia 35 (19); Rajesh Bishnoi 4/12 (4 overs)		Chirag Khurana 21 (21); Rahul Tewatia 3/4 (1.3 overs)

Haryana won by 83 runs.
Maharaja Yadavindra Singh International Cricket Stadium, Mullanpur
Umpires: Rajeev Godara and Rajesh Timaney

- Meghalaya won the toss and elected to field.
- Impact Player Subs: Sumit Kumar for Ankit Kumar (Haryana) and Swarajeet Das for Chengkam Sangma (Meghalaya).

12 October 2022
Scorecard

Maharashtra; 185/6 (20 overs)	v	Services; 189/5 (19.2 overs)
Ruturaj Gaikwad 112 (65); Mohit Kumar 3/42 (4 overs)		Rahul Singh 59 (38); Ashay Palkar 3/47 (4 overs)

Services won by 5 wickets
Inderjit Singh Bindra Stadium, Mohali
Umpires: Abhijit Bhattacharya and GS Ananth Ramakrishnan

- Services won the toss and elected to field.
- Impact Player Subs: Shamshuzama Kazi for Yash Nahar (Maharashtra) and Amit Pachhara for Nitin Yadav (Services).

12 October 2022
Scorecard

Jammu and Kashmir; 238/2 (20 overs)	v	Arunachal Pradesh; 65 (15.4 overs)
Shubham Khajuria 85 (39); Chetan Anand 1/29 (4 overs)		Techi Doria 30 (32); Abid Mushtaq 4/7 (4 overs)

Jammu and Kashmir won by 173 runs
Maharaja Yadavindra Singh International Cricket Stadium, Mullanpur
Umpires: Rajeev Godara and Rajesh Timaney

- Arunachal Pradesh won the toss and elected to field.
- Impact Player Subs: Nabam Tempol for Yab Niya (Arunachal Pradesh) and Vivrant Sharma for Jatin Wadhwan (Jammu and Kashmir).

12 October 2022
Scorecard

Kerala; 179/4 (20 overs)	v	Karnataka; 126/9 (20 overs)
Mohammed Azharuddeen 95 *(47); Jagadeesha Suchith 2/25 (4 overs)		Abhinav Manohar 46* (27); Vaishak Chandran 4/11 (4 overs)

Kerala won by 53 runs.
Inderjit Singh Bindra Stadium, Mohali
Umpires: Abhijit Bhattacharya and GS Ananth Ramakrishnan

- Kerala won the toss and elected to bat.
- Vaishak Chandran (Kerala) and LR Chethan (Karnataka) both made their T20 debuts.
- Impact Player Subs: LR Chethan
for Vidhwath Kaverappa (Karnataka) and Sudhesan Midhun for Vishnu Vinod (Kerala).

=== Round 3 ===
14 October 2022
Scorecard

Meghalaya; 89/8 (20 overs)	v	Karnataka; 90/1 (10.1 overs)
Larry Sangma 34 (25); Vijaykumar Vyshak 3/5 (4 overs)		Mayank Agarwal 47* (29); Abhishek Kumar 1/15 (3 overs)

Karnataka won by 9 wickets
Maharaja Yadavindra Singh International Cricket Stadium, Mullanpur
Umpires: GS Ananth Ramakrishnan and Rajesh Timaney

- Meghalaya won the toss and elected to bat.
- M Venkatesh (Karnataka) made his T20 debut.
- Impact Player Subs: Kilco Marak for Kishan Lyngdoh (Meghalaya) and M Venkatesh for Vijaykumar Vyshak (Karnataka).

14 October 2022
Scorecard

Haryana; 131/7 (20 overs)	v	Kerala; 132/7 (19 overs)
Jayant Yadav 39 (25); Abdul Basith 1/8 (2 overs)		Abdul Basith 27* (15); Rahul Tewatia 3/18 (4 overs)

Kerala won by 3 wickets
Inderjit Singh Bindra Stadium, Mohali
Umpires: Abhijit Bhattacharya and Rajeev Godara

- Kerala won the toss and elected to field.
- Impact Player Subs: Krishna Prasad for KM Asif (Kerala) and Pramod Chandila for Aman Kumar (Haryana).

14 October 2022
Scorecard

Arunachal Pradesh; 75 (19.4 overs)	v	Services; 76/1 (9 overs)
Nabam Tempol 29 (33); Parth Rekhade 2/10 (4 overs)		Anshul Gupta 38* (25); Tanmay Gupta 1/20 (2 overs)

Services won by 9 wickets
Maharaja Yadavindra Singh International Cricket Stadium, Mullanpur
Umpires: GS Ananth Ramakrishnan and Rajesh Timaney

- Arunachal Pradesh won the toss and elected to bat.
- Impact Player Sub: Nabam Tempol for Yab Niya (Arunachal Pradesh).

14 October 2022
Scorecard

Jammu and Kashmir; 175/5 (20 overs)	v	Maharashtra; 176/7 (19.3 overs)
Abdul Samad 55 (33); Rajvardhan Hangargekar 2/28 (4 overs)		Rahul Tripathi 59 (32); Umran Malik 4/27 (4 overs)

Maharashtra won by 3 wickets
Inderjit Singh Bindra Stadium, Mohali
Umpires: Abhijit Bhattacharya and Rajeev Godara

- Maharashtra won the toss and elected to field.
- Impact Player Subs: Auqib Nabi for Jatin Wadhwan (Jammu and Kashmir) and Pavan Shah for Manoj Ingale (Maharashtra).

=== Round 4 ===
16 October 2022
Scorecard

Services; 148/8 (20 overs)	v	Kerala; 136 (19.4 overs)
Anshul Gupta 39 (35); Vaisakh Chandran 3/28 (4 overs)		Sachin Baby 36 (35); Nitin Yadav 3/12 (2.4 overs)

Services won by 12 runs
Maharaja Yadavindra Singh International Cricket Stadium, Mullanpur
Umpires: GS Ananth Ramakrishnan and Rajesh Timaney

- Kerala won the toss and elected to field.
- Impact Player Subs: Krishna Prasad for Vaisakh Chandran (Kerala) and Parth Rekhade for Ravi Chauhan (Services).

16 October 2022
Scorecard

Maharashtra; 144 (20 overs)	v	Meghalaya; 70 (18.1 overs)
Ruturaj Gaikwad 38 (33); Abhishek Kumar 4/37 (4 overs)		Yogesh Tiwari 26 (41); Satyajeet Bachhav 4/20 (4 overs)

Maharashtra won by 74 runs
Inderjit Singh Bindra Stadium, Mohali
Umpires: Abhijit Bhattacharya and Rajeev Godara

- Meghalaya won the toss and elected to field.
- Vicky Ostwal and Yash Kshirsagar (Maharashtra) both made their T20 debuts.
- Impact Player Subs: Siddhesh Veer for Pavan Shah (Maharashtra) and Swarajeet Das for Kilco Marak (Meghalaya).

16 October 2022
Scorecard

Karnataka; 147/7 (20 overs)	v	Jammu and Kashmir; 113 (18.2 overs)
Shreyas Gopal 48* (38); Rithik Singh 2/16 (3 overs)		Vivrant Sharma 63 (46); Vidhwath Kaverappa 5/11 (3.2 overs)

Karnataka won by 34 runs
Maharaja Yadavindra Singh International Cricket Stadium, Mullanpur
Umpires: GS Ananth Ramakrishnan and Rajesh Timaney

- Karnataka won the toss and elected to bat.
- Rithik Singh (Jammu and Kashmir) made his T20 debut.
- Impact Player Subs: Shreyas Gopal for Abhinav Manohar (Karnataka) and Vivrant Sharma for Mujtaba Yousuf (Jammu and Kashmir).

16 October 2022
Scorecard

Haryana; 190/6 (20 overs)	v	Arunachal Pradesh; 86/8 (20 overs)
Chaitanya Bishnoi 78* (54); Myendung Singpho 2/24 (4 overs)		Neelam Obi 24 (31); Rahul Tewatia 3/18 (4 overs)

Haryana won by 104 runs
Inderjit Singh Bindra Stadium, Mohali
Umpires: Abhijit Bhattacharya and Rajeev Godara

- Arunachal Pradesh won the toss and elected to field.
- Impact Player Sub: Sumit Kumar for Chaitanya Bishnoi (Haryana).

=== Round 5 ===
18 October 2022
Scorecard

Jammu and Kashmir; 134/6 (20 overs)	v	Haryana; 138/6 (19.4 overs)
Abdul Samad 41* (26); Sumit Kumar 2/7 (2 overs)		Dinesh Bana 43 (41); Mujtaba Yousuf 3/28 (4 overs)

Haryana won by 4 wickets
Maharaja Yadavindra Singh International Cricket Stadium, Mullanpur
Umpires: Abhijit Bhattacharya and Rajeev Godara

- Haryana won the toss and elected to field.
- Sunil Kumar (Jammu and Kashmir) made his T20 debut.
- Impact Player Subs: Sumit Kumar for Aman Kumar (Haryana) and Vivrant Sharma for Shubham Khajuria (Jammu and Kashmir).

18 October 2022
Scorecard

Arunachal Pradesh; 75 (19.2 overs)	v	Karnataka; 76/0 (6.5 overs)
Rohan Sharma 18 (36); Vasuki Koushik 3/5 (3.2 overs)		Mayank Agarwal 47* (21)

Karnataka won by 10 wickets
Inderjit Singh Bindra Stadium, Mohali
Umpires: GS Ananth Ramakrishnan and Rajesh Timaney

- Karnataka won the toss and elected to field.
- Mohit Panwar (Arunachal Pradesh) made his T20 debut.

18 October 2022
Scorecard

Maharashtra; 167/4 (20 overs)	v	Kerala; 127/8 (20 overs)
Ruturaj Gaikwad 114 (68); Sijomon Joseph 3/18 (4 overs)		Rohan Kunnummal 58 (44); Satyajeet Bachhav 3/11 (4 overs)

Maharashtra won by 40 runs
Maharaja Yadavindra Singh International Cricket Stadium, Mullanpur
Umpires: Abhijit Bhattacharya and Rajeev Godara

- Maharashtra won the toss and elected to bat.
- Shoun Roger (Kerala) made his T20 debut.
- Impact Player Sub: Sijomon Joseph for Vaisakh Chandran (Kerala).

18 October 2022
Scorecard

Meghalaya; 148/5 (20 overs)	v	Services; 151/5 (19 overs)
Puneet Bisht 42 (26); Pulkit Narang 2/19 (4 overs)		Vikas Hathwala 55 (42); Rajesh Bishnoi 2/29 (3 overs)

Services won by 5 wickets
Inderjit Singh Bindra Stadium, Mohali
Umpires: GS Ananth Ramakrishnan and Rajesh Timaney

- Meghalaya won the toss and elected to bat.
- Gaurav Sharma (Services) made his T20 debut.
- Impact Player Subs: Anish Charak for Rohit Shah (Meghalaya) and Parth Rekhade for Gaurav Sharma (Services).

=== Round 6 ===
20 October 2022
Scorecard

Services; 129/8 (20 overs)	v	Karnataka; 130/2 (18.1 overs)
Amit Pachhara 35 (24); Vijaykumar Vyshak 3/24 (4 overs)		LR Chethan 61* (52); Pulkit Narang 1/14 (2 overs)

Karnataka won by 8 wickets
Maharaja Yadavindra Singh International Cricket Stadium, Mullanpur
Umpires: Abhijit Bhattacharya and Rajeev Godara

- Karnataka won the toss and elected to field.
- Impact Player Subs: Parth Rekhade for Anshul Gupta (Services) and Shreyas Gopal for Vasuki Koushik (Karnataka).

20 October 2022
Scorecard

Kerala; 184/4 (20 overs)	v	Jammu and Kashmir; 122 (19 overs)
Sachin Baby 62 (32); Mujtaba Yousuf 2/47 (4 overs)		Shubham Khajuria 30 (14); KM Asif 3/15 (3 overs)

Kerala won by 62 runs
Inderjit Singh Bindra Stadium, Mohali
Umpires: GS Ananth Ramakrishnan and Rajesh Timaney

- Kerala won the toss and elected to bat.
- Lone Nasir (Jammu and Kashmir) made his T20 debut.
- Impact Player Subs: Sudhesan Midhun for Mohammed Azharuddeen (Kerala) and Vivrant Sharma for Rithik Singh (Jammu and Kashmir).

20 October 2022
Scorecard

Maharashtra; 136/5 (20 overs)	v	Haryana; 138/7 (20 overs)
Azim Kazi 41* (24); Amit Mishra 2/16 (4 overs)		Chaitanya Bishnoi 51 (46); Satyajeet Bachhav 2/27 (4 overs)

Haryana won by 3 wickets
Maharaja Yadavindra Singh International Cricket Stadium, Mullanpur
Umpires: Abhijit Bhattacharya and Rajeev Godara

- Maharashtra won the toss and elected to bat.
- Piyush Dahiya and Yuvraj Singh (Haryana) both made their T20 debuts.
- Impact Player Subs: Pavan Shah for Siddhesh Veer (Maharashtra) and Piyush Dahiya for Aman Kumar (Haryana).

20 October 2022
Scorecard

Meghalaya; 167/5 (20 overs)	v	Arunachal Pradesh; 118/8 (20 overs)
Chirag Khurana 73 (61); Myendung Singpho 1/22 (4 overs)		Techi Doria 40 (38); Rajesh Bishnoi 3/17 (4 overs)

Meghalaya won by 49 runs
Inderjit Singh Bindra Stadium, Mohali
Umpires: GS Ananth Ramakrishnan and Rajesh Timaney

- Arunachal Pradesh won the toss and elected to field.
- Riboklang Hynniewta (Meghalaya) and Tollum Makcha (Arunachal Pradesh) both made their T20 debuts.
- Impact Player Subs: Anish Charak for Rohit Shah (Meghalaya) and Neelam Obi for Yab Niya (Arunachal Pradesh).

=== Round 7 ===
22 October 2022
Scorecard

Maharashtra; 162/5 (20 overs)	v	Arunachal Pradesh; 99/9 (20 overs)
Kaushal Tambe 62* (29); Akhilesh Sahani 1/23 (4 overs)		Neelam Obi 29 (39); Satyajeet Bachhav 3/25 (4 overs)

Maharashtra won by 63 runs
Maharaja Yadavindra Singh International Cricket Stadium, Mullanpur
Umpires: GS Ananth Ramakrishnan and Rajesh Timaney

- Arunachal Pradesh won the toss and elected to field.
- Nabam Hachang (Arunachal Pradesh) made his T20 debut.
- Impact Player Subs: Kaushal Tambe for Yash Nahar (Maharashtra) and Techi Sonam for Tollum Makcha (Meghalaya).

22 October 2022
Scorecard

Haryana; 125/9 (20 overs)	v	Karnataka; 129/5 (17.2 overs)
Rahul Tewatia 27 (23); Krishnappa Gowtham 3/17 (4 overs)		Manish Pandey 64* (47); Mohit Sharma 2/22 (3 overs)

Karnataka won by 5 wickets
Inderjit Singh Bindra Stadium, Mohali
Umpires: Abhijit Bhattacharya and Rajeev Godara

- Karnataka won the toss and elected to field.
- Anshul Kamboj (Haryana) made his T20 debut.
- Impact Player Subs: Piyush Dahiya for Ankit Kumar (Haryana) and Shreyas Gopal for Vasuki Koushik (Karnataka).

22 October 2022
Scorecard

Meghalaya; 100/8 (20 overs)	v	Kerala; 101/5 (12.2 overs)
Larry Sangma 20 (19); Vaisakh Chandran 2/18 (4 overs)		Sachin Baby 28 (24); Chengkam Sangma 3/19 (3 overs)

Kerala won by 5 wickets
Maharaja Yadavindra Singh International Cricket Stadium, Mullanpur
Umpires: GS Ananth Ramakrishnan and Rajesh Timaney

- Meghalaya won the toss and elected to bat.
- Impact Player Subs: Kishan Lyngdoh for Rohit Shah (Meghalaya) and Sudhesan Midhun for Unnikrishnan Manukrishnan (Kerala).

22 October 2022
Scorecard

Jammu and Kashmir; 149/6 (20 overs)	v	Services; 152/7 (19.2 overs)
Vivrant Sharma 50 (32); Parth Rekhade 3/31 (4 overs)		Rahul Singh 47 (22); Auqib Nabi 3/21 (3.2 overs)

Services won by 3 wickets
Inderjit Singh Bindra Stadium, Mohali
Umpires: Abhijit Bhattacharya and Rajeev Godara

- Services won the toss and elected to field.
- Impact Player Subs: Parth Rekhade for Nitin Yadav (Services) and Umran Malik for Henan Nazir (Jammu and Kashmir).
