= 2021–22 Vijay Hazare Trophy Group D =

Cricket tournament

- Dates: 8 – 27 December 2021
- Administrator(s): BCCI
- Cricket format: List A cricket
- Tournament format(s): Round-robin
- Participants: 6

The 2021–22 Vijay Hazare Trophy was the twentieth season of the Vijay Hazare Trophy, a List A cricket tournament that was played in India. It was being contested by 38 teams, divided into six groups, with six teams in Group D. The tournament was announced by the BCCI on 3 July 2021. Kerala won Group D to progress to the quarter-finals, with Madhya Pradesh finishing in second place to advance to the preliminary quarter-finals.

== Points table ==
Pos	Team	Pld	W	L	NR	Pts	NRR
1	Kerala	5	4	1	0	16	0.974
2	Madhya Pradesh	5	4	1	0	16	0.485
3	Maharashtra	5	4	1	0	16	0.104
4	Chhattisgarh	5	2	3	0	8	−0.141
5	Uttarakhand	5	1	4	0	4	−0.711
6	Chandigarh	5	0	5	0	0	−0.650

Source: ESPN Cricinfo

Advanced to Quarter-final
Advanced to Preliminary quarter-final

== Fixtures ==
=== Round 1 ===
8 December 2021
Scorecard

Madhya Pradesh; 328/6 (50 overs)	v	Maharashtra; 330/5 (49.4 overs)
Shubham Sharma 108 (102); Mukesh Choudhary 2/54 (10 overs)		Ruturaj Gaikwad 136 (112); Aman Bhadoriya 2/54 (7 overs)

Maharashtra won by 5 wickets
Saurashtra Cricket Association Stadium, Rajkot
Umpires: Sundaram Ravi and Tapan Sharma

- Madhya Pradesh won the toss and elected to bat.
- Aman Bhadoriya, Siddharth Patidar (Madhya Pradesh), Manoj Ingale, Swapnil Fulpagar and Taranjitsingh Dhillon (Maharashtra) all made their List A debuts.

8 December 2021
Scorecard

Chhattisgarh; 256/6 (50 overs)	v	Uttarakhand; 235/5 (50 overs)
Amandeep Khare 106 (116); Agrim Tiwari 3/64 (9 overs)		Robin Bist 130* (127); Veer Pratap Singh 1/25 (8 overs)

Chhattisgarh won by 21 runs
Saurashtra Cricket Association Stadium C, Saurashtra
Umpires: Satrajit Lahiri and Sanjay Kumar Singh

- Chhattisgarh won the toss and elected to bat.
- Vijay Sharma (Uttarakhand) made his List A debut.

8 December 2021
Scorecard

Chandigarh; 184/8 (50 overs)	v	Kerala; 185/4 (34 overs)
Manan Vohra 56 (69); Sijomon Joseph 3/44 (10 overs)		Sachin Baby 59* (78); Yuvraj Chaudhary 1/31 (6 overs)

Kerala won by 6 wickets
Madhavrao Scindia Cricket Ground, Rajkot
Umpires: Navdeep Singh and Krishnamachari Srinivasan

- Kerala won the toss and elected to field.
- Arjit Pannu, Kunal Mahajan and Yuvraj Chaudhary (Chandigarh) all made their List A debuts.

=== Round 2 ===
9 December 2021
Scorecard

Chhattisgarh; 275/7 (50 overs)	v	Maharashtra; 276/2 (47 overs)
Amandeep Khare 82 (102); Mukesh Choudhary 4/67 (10 overs)		Ruturaj Gaikwad 154* (143); Ajay Mandal 2/47 (10 overs)

Maharashtra won by 8 wickets
Saurashtra Cricket Association Stadium, Rajkot
Umpires: GS Anantharamakrishnan and Rajeev Godara

- Maharashtra won the toss and elected to field.

9 December 2021
Scorecard

Madhya Pradesh; 329/9 (50 overs)	v	Kerala; 289 (49.4 overs)
Venkatesh Iyer 112 (84); Vishnu Vinod 3/59 (8 overs)		Sachin Baby 66 (66); Puneet Datey 4/59 (8.4 overs)

Madhya Pradesh won by 40 runs
Saurashtra Cricket Association Stadium C, Saurashtra
Umpires: Sundaram Ravi and Tapan Sharma

- Kerala won the toss and elected to field.

9 December 2021
Scorecard

Chandigarh; 269/9 (50 overs)	v	Uttarakhand; 270/7 (49.2 overs)
Sarul Kanwar 97 (98); Agrim Tiwari 3/51 (9 overs)		Jay Bista 68 (86); Yuvraj Chaudhary 3/48 (10 overs)

Uttarakhand won by 3 wickets
Madhavrao Scindia Cricket Ground, Rajkot
Umpires: Satrajit Lahiri and Sanjay Kumar Singh

- Uttarakhand won the toss and elected to field.
- Amrit Lubana (Chandigarh) made his List A debut.

=== Round 3 ===
11 December 2021
Scorecard

Chhattisgarh; 302/4 (50 overs)	v	Chandigarh; 258 (48.2 overs)
Harpreet Singh 113 (119); Devinder Singh 2/59 (10 overs)		Manan Vohra 77 (95); Sourabh Majumdar 4/52 (9.2 overs)

Chhattisgarh won by 44 runs
Saurashtra Cricket Association Stadium, Rajkot
Umpires: Navdeep Singh and Krishnamachari Srinivasan

- Chhattisgarh won the toss and elected to bat.
- Devinder Singh (Chandigarh) made his List A debut.

11 December 2021
Scorecard

Madhya Pradesh; 330/7 (50 overs)	v	Uttarakhand; 253/9 (50 overs)
Abhishek Bhandari 106 (113); Ankit Manori 2/50 (8 overs)		Dikshanshu Negi 75 (58); Puneet Datey 3/35 (10 overs)

Madhya Pradesh won by 77 runs
Saurashtra Cricket Association Stadium C, Saurashtra
Umpires: Rajeev Godara and GS Ananth Ramakrishnan

- Madhya Pradesh won the toss and elected to bat.
- Kuldeep Gehi (Madhya Pradesh) made his List A debut.

11 December 2021
Scorecard

Maharashtra; 291/8 (50 overs)	v	Kerala; 294/6 (48.5 overs)
Ruturaj Gaikwad 124 (129); MD Nideesh 5/49 (10 overs)		Vishnu Vinod 100* (82); Ashay Palkar 2/51 (10 overs)

Kerala won by 4 wickets
Madhavrao Scindia Cricket Ground, Rajkot
Umpires: Sundaram Ravi and Tapan Sharma

- Kerala won the toss and elected to field.
- Suresh Vishweshwar (Kerala) made his List A debut.

=== Round 4 ===
12 December 2021
Scorecard

Madhya Pradesh; 331/9 (50 overs)	v	Chandigarh; 326/8 (50 overs)
Venkatesh Iyer 151 (113); Jagjit Singh 3/69 (10 overs)		Ankit Kaushik 111 (119); Avesh Khan 3/72 (10 overs)

Madhya Pradesh won by 5 runs
Saurashtra Cricket Association Stadium, Rajkot
Umpires: Satrajit Lahiri and Sanjay Kumar Singh

- Madhya Pradesh won the toss and elected to bat.

12 December 2021
Scorecard

Chhattisgarh; 189 (46.2 overs)	v	Kerala; 193/5 (34.3 overs)
Harpreet Singh Bhatia 98 (128); Sijomon Joseph 5/33 (10 overs)		Vinoop Manoharan 54* (72); Ajay Mandal 3/27 (10 overs)

Kerala won by 5 wickets
Saurashtra Cricket Association Stadium C, Saurashtra
Umpires: Navdeep Singh and Krishnamachari Srinivasan

- Chhattisgarh won the toss and elected to bat.

12 December 2021
Scorecard

Uttarakhand; 251/6 (50 overs)	v	Maharashtra; 252/6 (49.5 overs)
Swapnil Singh 66 (66); Jagdish Zope 2/45 (10 overs)		Ankit Bawne 113* (132); Swapnil Singh 2/20 (9 overs)

Maharashtra won by 4 wickets
Madhavrao Scindia Cricket Ground, Rajkot
Umpires: Rajeev Godara and GS Ananth Ramakrishnan

- Maharashtra won the toss and elected to field.
- Himanshu Bisht and Sanyam Arora (Uttarakhand) both made their List A debuts.

=== Round 5 ===
14 December 2021
Scorecard

Uttarakhand; 224/9 (50 overs)	v	Kerala; 225/5 (35.4 overs)
Jay Bista 93 (114); M. D. Nidheesh 3/25 (8 overs)		Sachin Baby 83* (71); Deepesh Nainwal 2/40 (4.4 overs)

Kerala won by 5 wickets
Saurashtra Cricket Association Stadium, Rajkot
Umpires: Sundaram Ravi and Tapan Sharma

- Uttarakhand won the toss and elected to bat.
- Deepesh Nainwal and Md Nazim (Uttarakhand) both made their List A debuts.

14 December 2021
Scorecard

Chandigarh; 309/7 (50 overs)	v	Maharashtra; 313/5 (48.5 overs)
Manan Vohra 141 (139); Pradeep Dadhe 4/49 (10 overs)		Ruturaj Gaikwad 168 (132); Arpit Pannu 2/41 (10 overs)

Maharashtra won by 5 wickets
Saurashtra Cricket Association Stadium C, Saurashtra
Umpires: Satrajit Lahiri and Sanjay Kumar Singh

- Maharashtra won the toss and elected to field.

14 December 2021
Scorecard

Madhya Pradesh; 191 (45.5 overs)	v	Chhattisgarh; 188 (49.3 overs)
Shubham Sharma 56 (69); Ravi Kiran 3/36 (8.5 overs)		Sanjeet Desai 47 (46); Parth Sahani 2/21 (8.3 overs)

Madhya Pradesh won by 3 runs
Madhavrao Scindia Cricket Ground, Rajkot
Umpires: Navdeep Singh and Krishnamachari Srinivasan

- Madhya Pradesh won the toss and elected to field.
