= Kanwar Singh (disambiguation) =

Kanwar Singh may refer to:

- Kanwar Singh (cricketer and doctor), Indian military doctor and cricketer
- Kanwar Singh Tanwar, Indian Politician
- Kanwar Singh Chohan, Indian cricketer
- Kanwal Singh Chauhan, Indian farmer
- Kunwar Singh, Leader of the Indian rebellion of 1857
- Kanwaljit Singh Bakshi, New Zealand politician of the National Party
- Humble the Poet, Canadian YouTube personality
- Kunwar Singh Negi, Indian braille editor and social worker
- Kunwar Singh Tekam, Indian politician
