= Henan Nazir =

Indian cricketer (born 1997)

Henan Malik
Personal information
- Full name: Henan Nazir Malik
- Born: 25 March 1997 (age 29); Jammu, India
- Source: ESPNcricinfo, 25 December 2019

Henan Nazir (born 25 March 1997) is an Indian cricketer. He made his first-class debut on 25 December 2019, for Jammu & Kashmir in the 2019–20 Ranji Trophy. He made his List A debut on 27 February 2021, for Jammu & Kashmir in the 2020–21 Vijay Hazare Trophy. He made his Twenty20 debut on 5 November 2021, for Jammu & Kashmir in the 2021–22 Syed Mushtaq Ali Trophy.
