= Jiyaad Magrey =

Indian cricketer (born 1999)

Personal information
- Full name: Jiyaad Nazir Magrey
- Born: 29 October 1999 (age 27); Srinagar, India
- Source: ESPNcricinfo, 4 February 2020

Jiyaad Magrey (born 29 October 1999) is an Indian cricketer. He made his first-class debut on 4 February 2020, for Jammu & Kashmir in the 2019–20 Ranji Trophy. He made his Twenty20 debut on 18 January 2021, for Jammu & Kashmir in the 2020–21 Syed Mushtaq Ali Trophy.
