= Suryansh Raina =

Indian cricketer (born 1997)

Personal information
- Born: 15 August 1997 (age 29); Jammu, Jammu and Kashmir, India
- Source: Cricinfo, 7 January 2019

Suryansh Raina (born 15 August 1997) is an Indian cricketer. He made his first-class debut for Jammu & Kashmir in the 2018–19 Ranji Trophy on 7 January 2019. He made his Twenty20 debut for Jammu & Kashmir in the 2018–19 Syed Mushtaq Ali Trophy on 21 February 2019. He made his List A debut on 21 February 2021, for Jammu & Kashmir in the 2020–21 Vijay Hazare Trophy.
