= Sidharth Sarmah =

Indian cricketer (born 1998)

Personal information
- Full name: Sidharth Basudev Sarmah
- Born: 7 December 1998 (age 27)
- Batting: Left-handed
- Bowling: Slow left-arm orthodox
- Role: Bowler

Domestic team information
- Years: Team
- 2019–present: Assam
- Source: Cricinfo, 17 November 2020

Sidharth Sarmah (born 7 December 1998) is an Indian cricketer. He made his first-class debut on 17 December 2019, for Assam in the 2019–20 Ranji Trophy.
