= Maulana Azad Stadium =

Cricket stadium in Jammu, Jammu and Kashmir

- Jammu International Cricket Stadium
- Interactive map of Maulana Azad Stadium

Ground information
- Location: Jammu, Jammu & Kashmir, India
- Country: India
- Coordinates: 32.723°N 74.854°E
- Establishment: 1966
- Capacity: 20,000
- Tenants: Jammu and Kashmir cricket team
- End names
- n/a n/a

International information
- Only men's ODI: 19 December, 1988: India v New Zealand
- Only women's Test: 27–29 November 1976: India v West Indies
- Only women's ODI: 24 March 1985: India v New Zealand
- As of 8 December, 2019; Source: ESPNcricinfo

The Maulana Azad Stadium (also spelled Molana Azad Stadium) is a stadium in Jammu, India and is one of the home venues for the Jammu and Kashmir cricket team. It is located on the banks of the Tawi River

== Cricket ==
Maulana Azad Stadium has hosted home games for Jammu and Kashmir in domestic tournaments since 1966. It has also hosted one One Day International in 1988 between India and New Zealand, which was abandoned due to rain without a ball being bowled.

The stadium has played host to one women's test match where India lost to West Indies in 1976 and one Women's One Day International where India beat New Zealand in 1985. The Stadium hosted 4 Matches of 2023 Legends League Cricket from 27 November 2023 to 1 December 2023.

== Other uses ==
The ground is used for the Republic Day Parade in the state annually. In 1995, three bomb blasts containing RDX were set off by remote control at the stadium during the parade resulting in eight deaths and fifty four injuries. The blasts occurred when Governor General K V Krishna Rao was on stage taking salute with 30,000 people in attendance. Rao himself narrowly escaped the blast. In the year 2000, three solar-activated rockets programmed to hit Maulana Azad Stadium were found by the police a few days prior to the Republic Day Parade. Since the bombing incident in 1995 the entire turf is dug up as part of a security preparations prior to the Republic Day Parade. In 2000, as part of one of these excavations, an ancient structure of brick and plastered lime was unearthed. A newspaper report claimed that the structure was related to water since a drain was found. A lodging centre at the stadium has played host to pilgrims embarking on the Amarnath yatra, from where the yatra flags off.
