= Pallab Das =

Indian cricketer (born 1998)

Personal information
- Full name: Pallab Parimal Das
- Born: 31 August 1998 (age 28)
- Source: Cricinfo, 19 January 2020

Pallab Das (born 31 August 1998) is an Indian cricketer. He made his first-class debut on 19 January 2020, for Tripura in the 2019–20 Ranji Trophy.
