= Digvijay Deshmukh =

Indian cricketer (born 1998)

Personal information
- Full name: Digvijay Deshmukh
- Born: 12 April 1998 (age 28); Beed District, Maharashtra, India
- Source: ESPNcricinfo, 12 November 2019

Digvijay Deshmukh (born 12 April 1998) is an Indian cricketer. He made his Twenty20 debut on 12 November 2019, for Maharashtra in the 2019–20 Syed Mushtaq Ali Trophy. He made his first-class debut on 17 December 2019, for Maharashtra in the 2019–20 Ranji Trophy. In the 2020 IPL auction, he was bought by the Mumbai Indians ahead of the 2020 Indian Premier League.

Outside of cricket, he acted in the Bollywood film Kai Po Che! in 2013. He played the role of 14-year-old Ali Hashmi, a child cricketer, around whom the plot of the Sushant Singh Rajput, Rajkumar Rao, Amit Sadh-starrer revolved.
