= Kumar Suraj =

Indian cricketer (born 1997)

Personal information
- Full name: Kumar Suraj Prasad
- Born: 16 March 1997 (age 29); Jamshedpur, Jharkhand, India
- Batting: Left-handed

Domestic team information
- Years: Team
- 2019: India Emerging Team
- 2020-present: Jharkhand

Career statistics
Competition	FC	LA	T20
Matches	5	3	2
Runs scored	457	14	6
Batting average	57.12	7.00	3.00
100s/50s	2/2	0/0	0/0
Top score	107	10	5
Catches/stumpings	1/–	–/–	4/–
- Source: ESPNcricinfo, 31 March 2021

Kumar Suraj (born 16 March 1997) is an Indian cricketer. In November 2019, he was named in India's squad for the 2019 ACC Emerging Teams Asia Cup in Bangladesh. He made his List A debut for India, against Hong Kong, in the Emerging Teams Cup on 18 November 2019. He made his first-class debut on 11 January 2020, for Jharkhand in the 2019–20 Ranji Trophy. He made his Twenty20 debut on 12 January 2021, for Jharkhand in the 2020–21 Syed Mushtaq Ali Trophy.
