= Subham Mandal =

Indian cricketer (born 1998)

Personal information
- Full name: Subham Narayan Mandal
- Born: 23 August 1998 (age 28); Guwahati, Assam, India
- Batting: Left-handed
- Bowling: Right-arm offbreak
- Role: Opening batter

Domestic team information
- Years: Team
- 2020–present: Assam
- Source: Cricinfo, 11 January 2020

Subham Mandal (born 23 August 1998) is an Indian cricketer. He made his first-class debut on 11 January 2020, for Assam in the 2019–20 Ranji Trophy.
