= Harshit Saini =

Indian cricketer (born 1997)

Personal information
- Full name: Harshit Rajesh Saini
- Born: 9 June 1997 (age 29); Karnal, Haryana, India
- Batting: Right-handed
- Bowling: Slow left arm orthodox
- Source: ESPNcricinfo, 12 February 2020

Harshit Saini (born 9 June 1997) is an Indian cricketer. He made his first-class debut on 12 February 2020, for Haryana in the 2019–20 Ranji Trophy.
