= Prashant Kumar (cricketer) =

Indian cricketer (born 1992)

Personal information
- Born: 26 September 1992 (age 34)
- Source: Cricinfo, 17 December 2019

Prashant Kumar (born 26 September 1992) is an Indian cricketer. He made his first-class debut on 17 December 2019, for Haryana in the 2019–20 Ranji Trophy.
