= Dwaipayan Bhattacharjee =

Indian cricketer (born 1993)

Personal information
- Full name: Dwaipayan Tarakeswar Bhattacharjee
- Born: 2 November 1993 (age 33)
- Batting: Right handed
- Bowling: Right arm offbreak

Domestic team information
- Years: Team
- 2016–17: Tripura
- Source: ESPNcricinfo, 25 February 2017

Dwaipayan Bhattacharjee (born 2 November 1993) is an Indian cricketer. He made his List A debut for Tripura in the 2016–17 Vijay Hazare Trophy on 25 February 2017. He made his first-class debut on 3 January 2020, for Tripura in the 2019–20 Ranji Trophy.
