= Mujtaba Yousuf =

Indian cricketer (born 2002)

Personal information
- Born: 7 June 2002 (age 24)
- Batting: Left-handed
- Bowling: Left-arm medium-fast
- Role: Bowler

Domestic team information
- Years: Team
- 2019–present: Jammu & Kashmir
- Source: ESPNcricinfo, 20 February 2020

Mujtaba Yousuf is an Indian cricketer. He made his Twenty20 debut for Jammu & Kashmir in the 2018–19 Syed Mushtaq Ali Trophy on 21 February 2019. He made his List A debut on 3 October 2019, for Jammu & Kashmir in the 2019–20 Vijay Hazare Trophy. He made his first-class debut on 12 February 2020, for Jammu and Kashmir in the 2019–20 Ranji Trophy.
