= Sahil Raj =

Indian cricketer (born 2003)

Personal information
- Full name: Sahil Sunil Raj
- Born: 7 September 2003 (age 23); Patna, Bihar, India
- Source: Cricinfo, 27 January 2020

Sahil Raj (born 7 September 2003) is an Indian cricketer. He made his first-class debut on 27 January 2020, for Jharkhand in the 2019–20 Ranji Trophy.
