= Saahil Jain =

Indian cricketer (born 1998)

Personal information
- Full name: Saahil Manoj Jain
- Born: 22 October 1998 (age 28); Guwahati, Assam, India
- Batting: Right-handed
- Bowling: Right-arm off break
- Role: Batter

Domestic team information
- Years: Team
- 2019–present: Assam
- Source: Cricinfo, 25 December 2019

Saahil Jain (born 22 October 1998) is an Indian cricketer. He made his first-class debut on 25 December 2019, for Assam in the 2019–20 Ranji Trophy. He made his List A debut on 21 February 2021, for Assam in the 2020–21 Vijay Hazare Trophy.
