= Vipin Kumar =

Indian cricketer (born 1996)

Personal information
- Full name: Vipin Kumar
- Born: 10 January 1996 (age 30)
- Source: Cricinfo, 18 November 2019

Vipin Kumar (born 10 January 1996) is an Indian cricketer. He made his Twenty20 debut on 18 November 2019, for Haryana in the 2019–20 Syed Mushtaq Ali Trophy. He made his first-class debut on 11 January 2020, for Haryana in the 2019–20 Ranji Trophy.
