= Yuvraj Chaudhary =

Indian cricketer (born 2001)

Personal information
- Born: 6 October 2001 (age 25); Haridwar, Uttarakhand, India
- Batting: Left-handed
- Bowling: Slow left arm orthodox
- Role: All-rounder

Domestic team information
- Years: Team
- 2021-2024: Chandigarh
- 2024-present: Uttarakhand
- 2025: Lucknow Super Giants

Career statistics
Competition	FC	LA	T20
Matches	8	17	15
Runs scored	583	451	478
Batting average	38.86	28.18	47.80
100s/50s	1/2	1/3	1/3
Top score	158	151	123
Balls bowled	180	402	132
Wickets	2	10	8
Bowling average	56.50	35.90	16.37
5 wickets in innings	0	0	0
10 wickets in match	0	0	0
Best bowling	1/14	3/48	4/15
Catches/stumpings	3/–	6/–	4/–
- Source: ESPNcricinfo, 20 March 2025

Yuvraj Chaudhary (born 6 October 2001) is an Indian cricketer. He made his Twenty20 debut on 9 November 2021, for Chandigarh in the 2021–22 Syed Mushtaq Ali Trophy. He made his List A debut on 8 December 2021, for Chandigarh in the 2021–22 Vijay Hazare Trophy.
