= Harshit Bisht =

Indian cricketer (born 1999)

Personal information
- Full name: Harshit Shatrughan Bisht
- Born: 5 October 1999 (age 27); New Delhi, India
- Source: ESPNcricinfo, 9 November 2019

Harshit Shatrughan Bisht (born 5 October 1999) is an Indian cricketer. He made his Twenty20 debut on 9 November 2019, for Uttarakhand in the 2019–20 Syed Mushtaq Ali Trophy. He made his first-class debut on 19 January 2020, for Uttarakhand in the 2019–20 Ranji Trophy.
