= Kanwar Singh Chohan =

Indian cricketer (born 1998)

Personal information
- Full name: Kanwar Singh Chohan
- Born: 30 January 1998 (age 28)
- Batting: Right-handed
- Bowling: Right-arm medium-fast

Domestic team information
- Years: Team
- 2018–present: Odisha
- Source: ESPNcricinfo, 20 September 2018

Kanwar Singh Chohan (born 30 January 1998) is an Indian cricketer. He made his List A debut for Odisha in the 2018–19 Vijay Hazare Trophy on 20 September 2018. He made his first-class debut on 20 February 2020, for Odisha in the quarter-finals of the 2019–20 Ranji Trophy.
