= Shantanu Mishra =

Indian cricketer (born 1994)

Personal information
- Born: 30 May 1994 (age 32); Bhubaneswar, Odisha, India
- Batting: Right-handed
- Bowling: Right-arm offbreak
- Source: Cricinfo, 1 November 2017

Shantanu Mishra (born 30 May 1994) is an Indian cricketer. He made his first-class debut for Odisha in the 2017–18 Ranji Trophy on 1 November 2017. He made his List A debut for Odisha in the 2017–18 Vijay Hazare Trophy on 13 February 2018. He made his Twenty20 debut for Odisha in the 2018–19 Syed Mushtaq Ali Trophy on 2 March 2019.
