= Ranjeet Mali =

Indian cricketer (born 1988)

Personal information
- Full name: Ranjeet Laxman Mali
- Born: 5 November 1988 (age 37); Tezpur, Assam, India
- Batting: Right-handed
- Bowling: Right-arm medium
- Role: Bowler

Domestic team information
- Years: Team
- 2008/09–2010/11: Assam
- 2011/12–2016/17: Railways
- 2018/19–2023/24: Assam
- Source: Cricinfo, 19 January 2020

Ranjeet Laxman Mali (born 5 November 1988) is an Indian cricketer. Mali made his first class debut for Assam against Tripura at Agartala in the 2008-09 Ranji Trophy. He is a right-arm fast medium bowler. In November 2018, he took his 100th first class wicket in the Ranji Trophy match against Jharkhand.
