= Arya Sethi =

Indian cricketer (born 2001)

Personal information
- Full name: Arya Sethi
- Born: February 9, 2001 (age 25); Dehradun, Uttarakhand, India
- Batting: Right-handed
- Bowling: Right-arm

Domestic team information
- Years: Team
- 2018/19-2020/21: Uttarakhand

Career statistics
| Competition | FC | List A | T20 |
|---|---|---|---|
| Matches | 3 | 4 | 1 |
| Runs scored | 29 | 85 | 7 |
| Batting average | 4.83 | 28.33 | 7.00 |
| 100s/50s | 0/0 | 0/1 | 0/0 |
| Top score | 12 | 50 | 7 |
| Catches/stumpings | 0/0 | 0/0 | 0/0 |
- Source: Cricinfo, 11 December 2025

Arya Sethi (born 9 February 2001) is an Indian cricketer.

== Biography ==
Arya Sethi was born in Dehradun, Uttarakhand, India.

In 2016 he was selected vice-captain of the "Under-16" Uttar Pradesh cricket team. He made his List A debut for Uttarakhand in the 2018–19 Vijay Hazare Trophy on 26 September 2018. He made his Twenty20 debut on 8 November 2019, for Uttarakhand in the 2019–20 Syed Mushtaq Ali Trophy. He made his first-class debut on 9 December 2019, for Uttarakhand in the 2019–20 Ranji Trophy.

In 2022, the father of Sethi file a request for criminal investigation on charges of assault, extortion and criminal intimidation against the Cricket Association of Uttarakhand. After that further news broke out about the allegations of other misconduct of the association.
