= Swapnil Fulpagar =

Indian cricketer (born 1998)

Personal information
- Full name: Swapnil Parmod Fulpagar
- Born: 16 November 1998 (age 27); Pune, Maharashtra, India
- Batting: Right-handed
- Bowling: Right arm medium
- Source: Cricinfo, 12 February 2020

Swapnil Fulpagar (born 16 November 1998) is an Indian cricketer. He made his first-class debut on 12 February 2020, for Maharashtra in the 2019–20 Ranji Trophy. He made his List A debut on 8 December 2021, for Maharashtra in the 2021–22 Vijay Hazare Trophy.
