= Yash Kshirsagar =

Indian cricketer (born 1998)

Personal information
- Born: 17 December 1998 (age 27)
- Source: Cricinfo, 11 January 2020

Yash Kshirsagar (born 17 December 1998) is an Indian cricketer. He made his first-class debut on 11 January 2020, for Maharashtra in the 2019–20 Ranji Trophy.
