= Gaurav Singh (Uttarakhand cricketer) =

Indian cricketer (born 1996)

Personal information
- Born: 8 November 1996 (age 30); Dehradun, Uttarakhand, India
- Source: ESPNcricinfo, 2 March 2019

Gaurav Singh (born 8 November 1996) is an Indian cricketer. He made his Twenty20 debut for Uttarakhand in the 2018–19 Syed Mushtaq Ali Trophy on 2 March 2019. He made his first-class debut on 17 December 2019, for Uttarakhand in the 2019–20 Ranji Trophy.
