= Kamal Singh (Indian cricketer) =

Indian cricketer (born 2000)

Personal information
- Born: 29 November 2000 (age 25); Haldwani, Uttarakhand, India
- Source: ESPNcricinfo, 12 February 2020

Kamal Singh (born 29 November 2000) is an Indian cricketer. He made his first-class debut on 12 February 2020, for Uttarakhand in the 2019–20 Ranji Trophy, scoring a century in the first innings. He made his List A debut on 21 February 2021, for Uttarakhand in the 2020–21 Vijay Hazare Trophy.
