= Vishant More =

Indian cricketer (born 1991)

Personal information
- Full name: Vishant Vasantrao More
- Born: 25 November 1991 (age 34); Kolhapur, Maharashtra, India
- Batting: Right-handed
- Role: Wicketkeeper
- Source: Cricinfo, 27 January 2020

Vishant More (born 25 November 1991) is an Indian cricketer. He made his first-class debut on 3 November 2007, for Maharashtra in the 2007–08 Ranji Trophy. He made his Twenty20 debut on 18 January 2021, for Maharashtra in the 2020–21 Syed Mushtaq Ali Trophy.
