= Vijay Jethi =

Indian cricketer (born 1994)

Personal information
- Full name: Vijay Rajendra Jethi
- Born: 2 December 1994 (age 31); Jhankat, Udham Singh Nagar, Uttarakhand, India
- Source: Cricinfo, 6 October 2018

Vijay Jethi (born 2 December 1994) is an Indian cricketer. He made his List A debut for Uttarakhand in the 2018–19 Vijay Hazare Trophy on 6 October 2018. He made his first-class debut on 3 January 2020, for Uttarakhand in the 2019–20 Ranji Trophy. He made his Twenty20 debut on 4 November 2021, for Uttarakhand in the 2021–22 Syed Mushtaq Ali Trophy.
