= Sachidanand Pandey =

Indian cricketer (born 1996)

Personal information
- Born: 1 July 1996 (age 30); Allahabad, Uttar Pradesh, India
- Batting: Right-handed
- Bowling: Right arm medium
- Source: ESPNcricinfo, 22 October 2016

Sachidanand Pandey (born 1 July 1996) is an Indian cricketer. He made his first-class debut for Services in the 2016–17 Ranji Trophy on 20 October 2016. He made his List A debut for Services in the 2016–17 Vijay Hazare Trophy on 4 March 2017. He made his Twenty20 debut for Services in the 2017–18 Zonal T20 League on 13 January 2018.
