= Manoj Ingale =

Indian cricketer (born 1994)

Personal information
- Full name: Manoj D Ingale
- Born: 26 June 1994 (age 32); Satara, Maharashtra, India
- Batting: Right-handed
- Bowling: Right arm medium
- Role: Bowler
- Source: ESPNcricinfo, 3 January 2020

Manoj Ingale (born 26 June 1994) is an Indian cricketer. He made his Twenty20 debut for Maharashtra in the 2018–19 Syed Mushtaq Ali Trophy on 21 February 2019. He made his first-class debut on 3 January 2020, for Maharashtra in the 2019–20 Ranji Trophy. He made his List A debut on 8 December 2021, for Maharashtra in the 2021–22 Vijay Hazare Trophy.
