= Harman Singh =

Indian cricketer (born 2000)

Personal information
- Born: 19 May 2000 (age 26); Bajpur, Udham Singh Nagar, Uttarakhand, India
- Source: ESPNcricinfo, 27 January 2020

Harman Singh (born 19 May 2000) is an Indian cricketer. He made his first-class debut on 27 January 2020, for Uttarakhand in the 2019–20 Ranji Trophy.
