= Ram Dayal (cricketer) =

Indian cricketer (born 1988)

Personal information
- Born: 29 October 1988 (age 38); Jammu, India
- Batting: Right-handed
- Bowling: Right-arm medium

Domestic team information
- Years: Team
- 2008-present: Jammu & Kashmir
- Source: Cricinfo, 24 February 2020

Ram Dayal (born 29 October 1988) is an Indian first-class cricketer who plays for Jammu & Kashmir.
