= Kanwar Singh =

Indian cricketer and military doctor

Lieutenant Colonel Kanwar Shumshere Singh (21 June 1879 – 12 May 1975) was an Indian military doctor and cricketer.

Born in Bahraich, Singh attended Rugby School, where he made appearances for the school cricket eleven during 1896. Proceeding to Pembroke College, Cambridge, he had a trial in 1901 with Cambridge University's cricket team, and played a solitary match for them against Surrey. He also played in four first-class matches for Kent.

He was noted as a batsman with a "strong defence" and a fine fielder.

After Cambridge he trained as a doctor at St Bartholomew's Hospital in London and qualified in 1905. He was commissioned into the Indian Medical Service in 1906, being steadily promoted to the rank of lieutenant colonel in 1926. He retired in 1934.

At the time of his death in New Delhi, he was the oldest surviving Kent cricketer.

== Bibliography ==
- Carlaw, Derek (2020). Kent County Cricketers, A to Z: Part One (1806–1914) (PDF). Cardiff: ACS.
