= Bharat Ratna Dr. Babasaheb Ambedkar Stadium =

Cricket stadium in Baramati, Maharashtra, India

- Interactive map of Bharat Ratna Dr. Babasaheb Ambedkar Stadium
- Location: Baramati, Pune district, Maharashtra, India
- Country: India
- Coordinates: 18.1477668°N 74.5734108°E
- Establishment: 2016
- Capacity: 22,000+

The Bharat Ratna Dr. Babasaheb Ambedkar Stadium is a cricket stadium in Baramati, Pune district, Maharashtra, India. This stadium is available for national-international matches.

== History ==
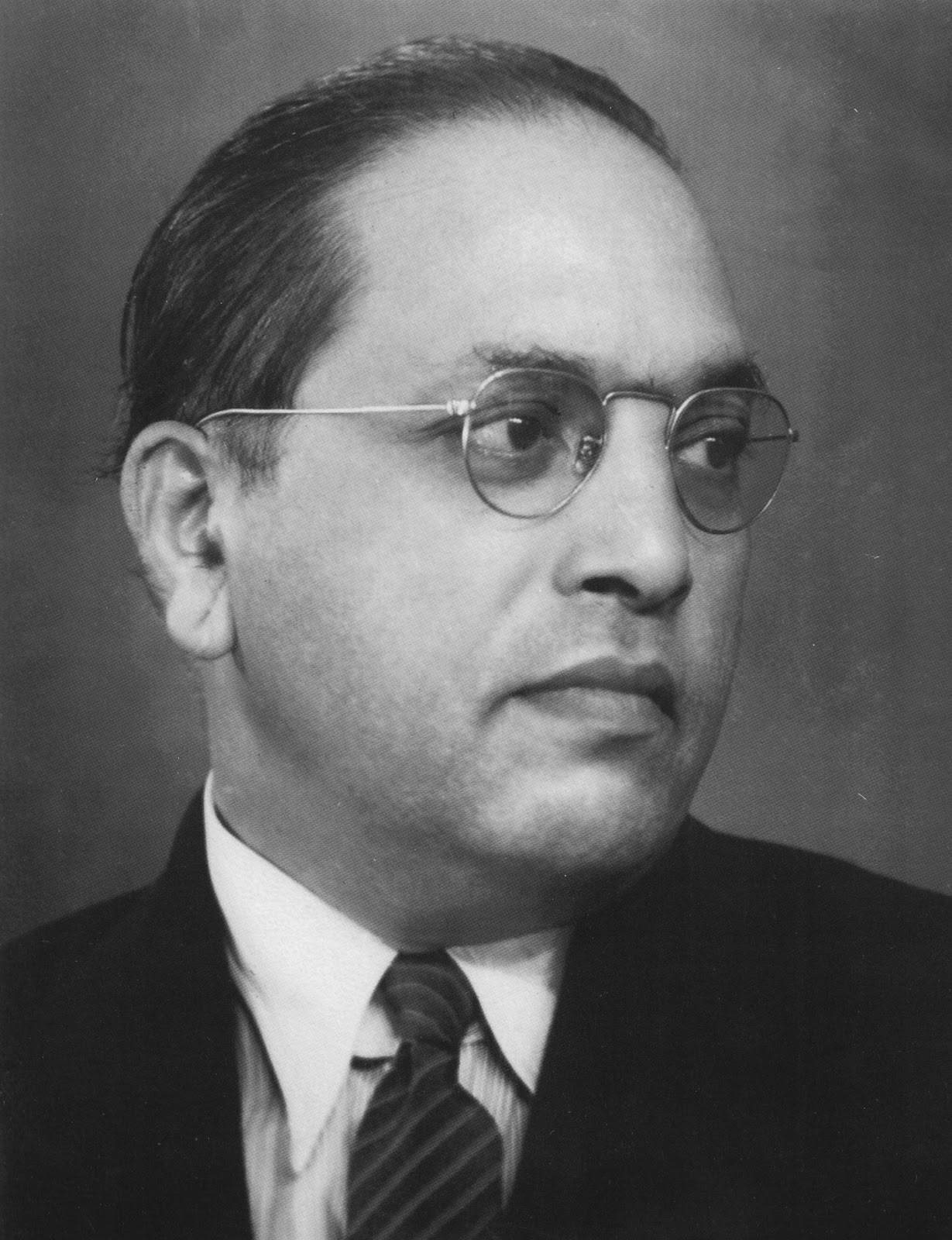
The stadium dedicated to B. R. Ambedkar.

This stadium was completed by the former Union Agriculture Minister Sharad Pawar. The stadium started construction in 1991, Babasaheb Ambedkar's birth centenary. In 2016, Ambedkar's Silver Jubilee Celebration (125th Ambedkar Jayanti) was inaugurated on the eve of the stadium's debut. The inauguration ceremony was officiated by cricket player, Sachin Tendulkar on 6 April 2016. Rohit Sharma, Ajinkya Rahane, Wasim Jaffer, Amol Muzumdar, Ajit Agarkar, Sharad Pawar and Supriya Sule were all present. An exhibition match was played between the Mumbai Cricket Association team and the Maharashtra Cricket Association team. The work started under the supervision of Mumbai Cricket Association's Nadeem Memon. The lawn was brought from South Africa.

== Structure ==
This cricket ground is set up on 28,844 square meters and it has 8 pitches. Two pitches have been made for the main stadium. The grounds accommodate 14 practice wicket centers, and 10 wicket pitches. The green cover from New Zealand was introduced on the field. The stadium seats around 22,000 spectators. The rest of the gallery, the pavilion and other works were done through the municipality, including VIP rooms, gymnasiums and all-weather stadium galleries.
