= Pradeep Chamoli =

Indian cricketer (born 1998)

Personal information
- Born: 23 April 1998 (age 28); Pauri Garhwal, Uttarakhand, India
- Source: Cricinfo, 25 September 2019

Pradeep Chamoli (born 23 April 1998) is an Indian cricketer. He made his List A debut on 27 September 2019, for Uttarakhand in the 2019–20 Vijay Hazare Trophy. He made his Twenty20 debut on 8 November 2019, for Uttarakhand in the 2019–20 Syed Mushtaq Ali Trophy. He made his first-class debut on 9 December 2019, for Uttarakhand in the 2019–20 Ranji Trophy.
