= Abdul Samad (Indian cricketer) =

Indian cricketer (born 2001)

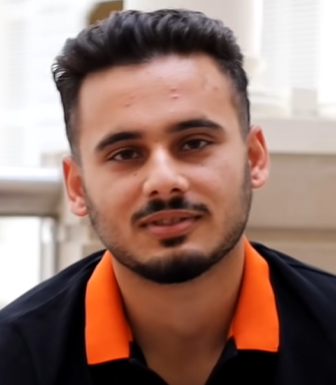
- Abdul Samad in 2022

Personal information
- Full name: Abdul Samad Farooq
- Born: 28 October 2001 (age 25); Kalakote, Jammu and Kashmir, India
- Height: 183 cm (6 ft 0 in)
- Batting: Right-handed
- Bowling: Right-arm leg break
- Role: Batsman

Domestic team information
- Years: Team
- 2019–: Jammu & Kashmir
- 2020–2024: Sunrisers Hyderabad (squad no. 1)
- 2025–present: Lucknow Super Giants
- FC debut: 09 December 2019 Jammu & Kashmir v Uttarakhand
- List A debut: 17 November 2022 Jammu & Kashmir v Punjab

Career statistics
Competition	FC	LA	T20
Matches	29	28	94
Runs scored	1,610	720	1,537
Batting average	40.25	25.71	26.50
100s/50s	6/6	1/6	0/5
Top score	128	112	76*
Balls bowled	364	252	128
Wickets	7	2	4
Bowling average	36.71	103.00	54.75
5 wickets in innings	0	0	0
10 wickets in match	0	0	0
Best bowling	1/0	1/11	1/9
Catches/stumpings	30/-	6/-	51/-
- Source: ESPNcricinfo, 9 April 2025

Abdul Samad (born 28 October 2001) is an Indian cricketer who plays for Jammu & Kashmir in domestic cricket and for the Lucknow Super Giants in the Indian Premier League (IPL). He is a right-handed batsman and right-arm leg-break bowler.

Abdul Samad is the third cricketer from Jammu & Kashmir to feature in the IPL. He made his IPL debut against Delhi Capitals on 29 September 2020.

== Early life ==
Abdul Samad, born on 28 October 2001 in Kalakote, is the son of Mohammed Farooq, who served in the department of youth services and sports. Growing up in the picturesque Kalakote village in Jammu, Abdul Samad was an unabashed fan of Rohit Sharma. His passion for batting like his idol manifested from friendly tennis matches with his brother Taiyyab to dedicated mirror practice sessions at home.

In 2009, Farooq made a strategic move from Kalakote to Sidhra, seeking better educational opportunities and a conducive environment for cricket for his sons. This relocation proved instrumental for Abdul Samad, catching the attention of former India all-rounder Irfan Pathan and Jammu and Kashmir coach Milap Mewada during a trial in Jammu. At the age of 16, Samad's ability to drive the ball on the up, particularly against fast bowlers from 18 yards out, left Pathan impressed.

The pivotal moment in Abdul Samad's career came when VVS Laxman, the mentor of Sunrisers Hyderabad, was in search of a dynamic middle-order finisher for the franchise. Mewada, having shared the field with Laxman during their Under-19 days, recommended the talented Abdul Samad for the crucial role, thus setting the stage for his entry into the Indian Premier League.

== Career ==
He made his Twenty20 debut for Jammu & Kashmir in the 2018–19 Syed Mushtaq Ali Trophy on 21 February 2019. He made his List A debut on 27 September 2019, for Jammu & Kashmir in the 2019–20 Vijay Hazare Trophy. He made his first-class debut on 9 December 2019, for Jammu & Kashmir in the 2019–20 Ranji Trophy.

He was signed by the Sunrisers Hyderabad for the 2020 Indian Premier League. He made his IPL debut on 29 September 2020, against the Delhi Capitals. He scored 288 runs in 28 matches in IPL He was retained by the franchise in the IPL 2022 auction. During Mega Auction for IPL 2025, Abdul Samad was purchased for 4.2 Cr by Lucknow Super Giants.
