= Saurabh Rawat =

Indian cricketer (born 1997)

Personal information
- Full name: Saurabh Anand Singh Rawat
- Born: 21 December 1997 (age 28); Delhi, India
- Batting: Right-handed
- Role: Wicket-keeper
- Source: ESPNcricinfo, 13 October 2016

Saurabh Rawat (born 21 December 1997) is an Indian cricketer. He made his first-class debut for Odisha in the 2016–17 Ranji Trophy on 13 October 2016. He made his Twenty20 debut for Odisha in the 2016–17 Inter State Twenty-20 Tournament on 29 January 2017. He made his List A debut for Odisha in the 2017–18 Vijay Hazare Trophy on 7 February 2018.

Ahead of the 2018–19 Ranji Trophy, he transferred from Odisha to Uttarakhand. In the round three fixture of the tournament, against Sikkim, he scored his maiden double century in first-class cricket, making 220 runs.
