= Umar Nazir Mir =

Indian cricketer (born 1993)

Personal information
- Full name: Umar Nazir Ahmed Mir
- Born: 3 November 1993 (age 33); Pulwama, Jammu and Kashmir, India
- Height: 193 cm (6 ft 4 in)
- Batting: Right-handed
- Bowling: Right-arm medium
- Role: Bowler

Domestic team information
- Years: Team
- 2013–present: Jammu & Kashmir
- Source: Cricinfo, 25 February 2021

Umar Nazir Mir (born 3 November 1993) is an Indian cricketer who plays for Jammu & Kashmir. In October 2018, he was named in India C's squad for the 2018–19 Deodhar Trophy.
