= Sunny Rana =

Indian cricketer (born 1987)

Personal information
- Full name: Sunny Rana
- Born: 25 December 1987 (age 38); Dehradun, Uttarakhand, India
- Source: Cricinfo, 20 September 2018

Sunny Rana (born 25 December 1987) is an Indian cricketer. He made his List A debut for Uttarakhand in the 2018–19 Vijay Hazare Trophy on 20 September 2018. He made his first-class debut for Uttarakhand in the 2018–19 Ranji Trophy on 1 November 2018. He made his Twenty20 debut for Uttarakhand in the 2018–19 Syed Mushtaq Ali Trophy on 21 February 2019.
