= Puneet Datey =

Indian cricketer (born 1994)

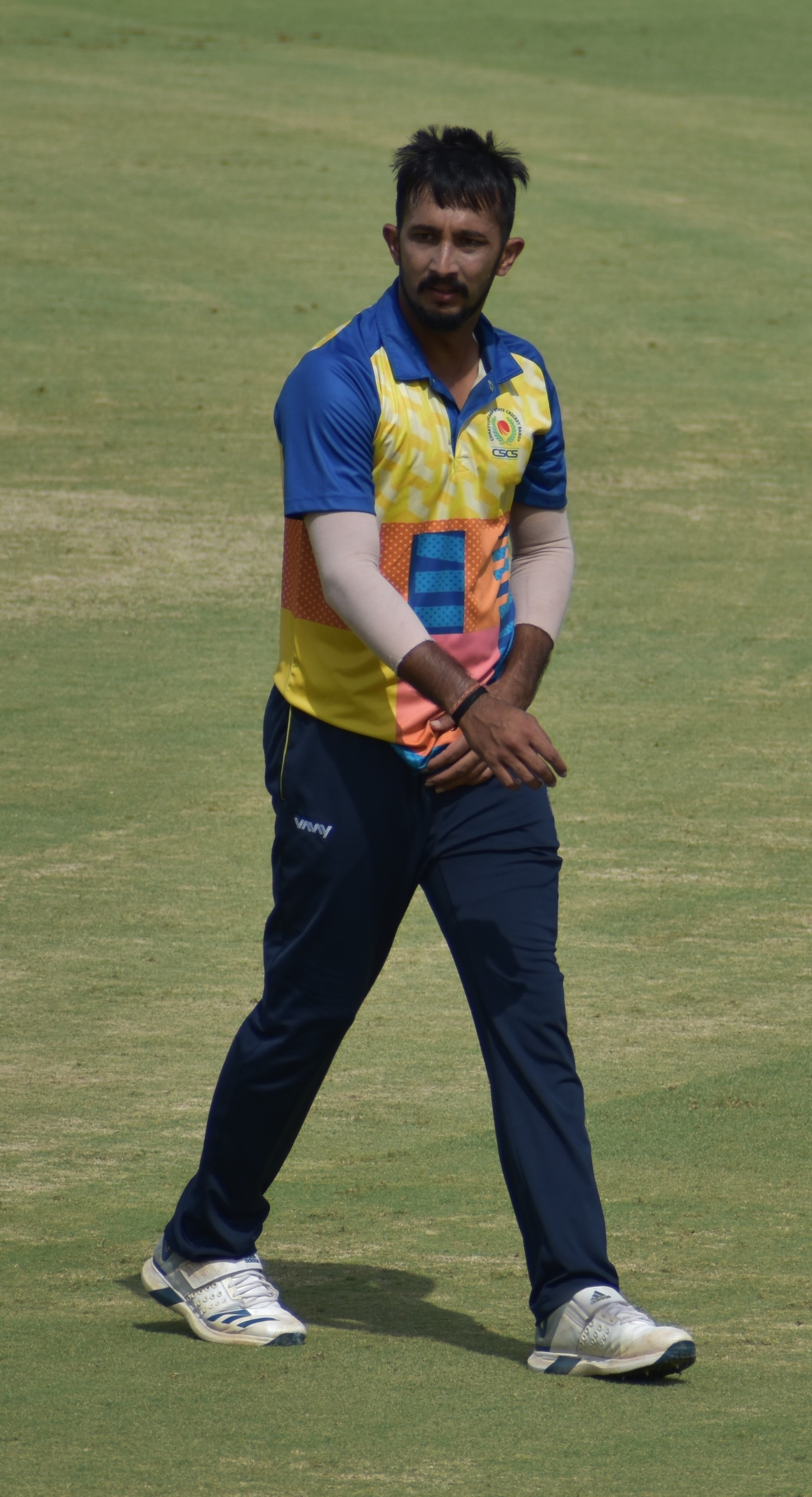
- Datey during the 2019–20 Vijay Hazare Trophy

Personal information
- Full name: Puneet Mukesh Datey
- Born: 10 September 1994 (age 32); Bhopal, Madhya Pradesh, India
- Batting: Right-handed
- Bowling: Right arm medium
- Role: Bowler

Domestic team information
- Years: Team
- 2013–present: Madhya Pradesh
- Source: Cricinfo, 10 October 2015

Puneet Datey (born 10 September 1994) is an Indian cricketer who plays for Madhya Pradesh. He made his List A debut on 27 February 2014, for Madhya Pradesh in the 2013–14 Vijay Hazare Trophy.
