= Debasish Samantray =

Indian cricketer (born 1996)

Personal information
- Born: 10 September 1996 (age 30); Dhenkanal, Odisha, India
- Batting: Left-handed
- Bowling: Right-arm offbreak

Domestic team information
- Years: Team
- 2018–: Odisha

Career statistics
| Competition | FC | LA | T20 |
|---|---|---|---|
| Matches | 12 | 3 | 2 |
| Runs scored | 861 | 35 | 44 |
| Batting average | 50.64 | 11.66 | 22.00 |
| 100s/50s | 3/4 | 0/0 | 0/0 |
| Top score | 195 | 24 | 25 |
| Balls bowled | 2,097 | 108 | 42 |
| Wickets | 0 | 0 | 0 |
| Bowling average | – | – | – |
| 5 wickets in innings | – | – | – |
| 10 wickets in match | – | – | – |
| Best bowling | – | – | – |
| Catches/stumpings | 4/– | –/– | –/– |
- Source: ESPNcricinfo, 23 January 2021

Debasish Samantray (born 10 September 1996) is an Indian cricketer. He made his Twenty20 debut for Odisha in the 2017–18 Zonal T20 League on 8 January 2018. He made his first-class debut for Odisha in the 2018–19 Ranji Trophy on 14 December 2018. He made his List A debut on 12 October 2019, for Odisha in the 2019–20 Vijay Hazare Trophy.
