= Govt. Gandhi Memorial Science College =

College in Jammu, Jammu and Kashmir

Govt. Gandhi Memorial Science College, Jammu
- GGM Science College, Jammu
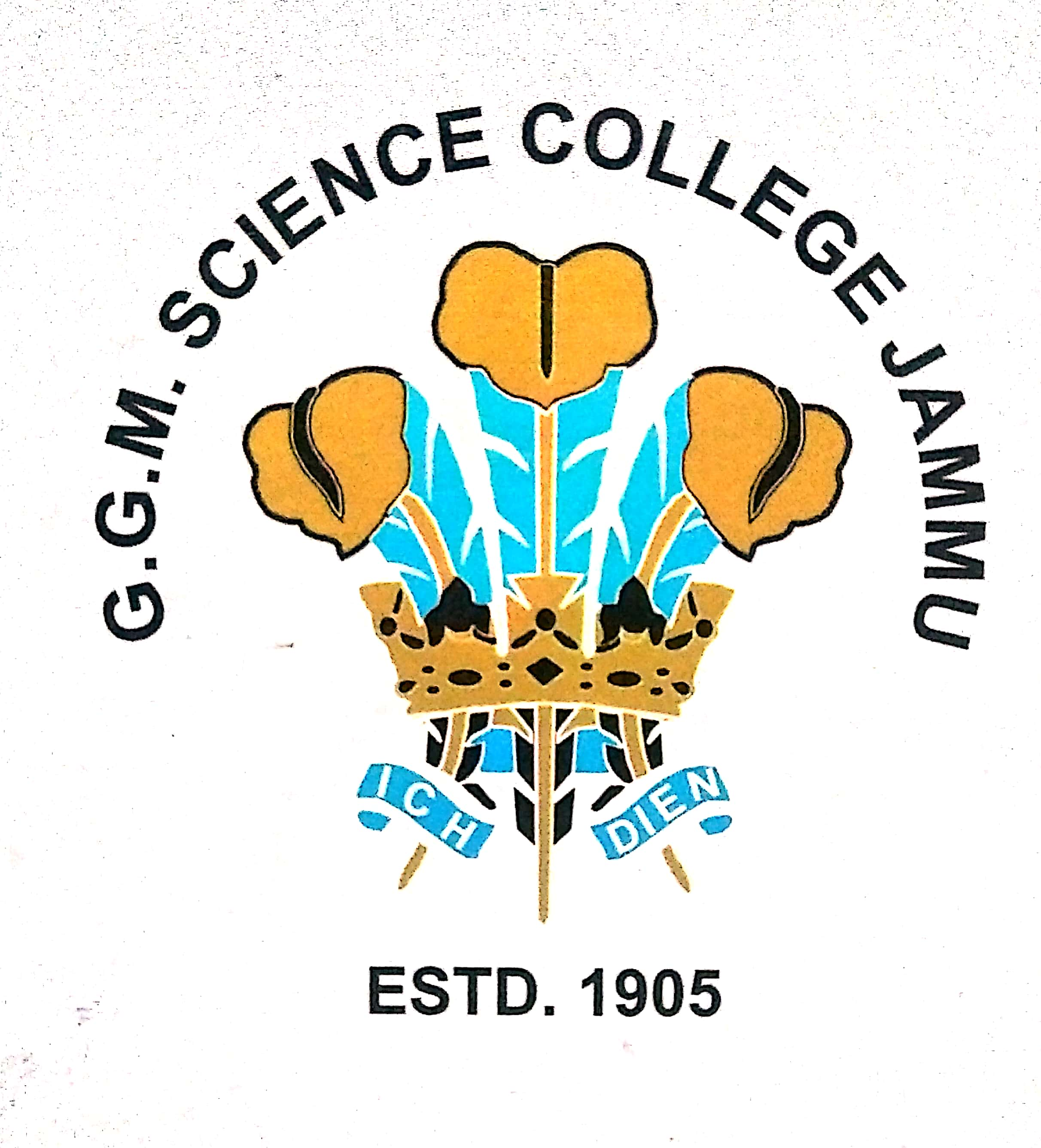
- GGM Science College Jammu Logo
- Former names: Prince of Wales College
- Motto: Ich dien
- Motto in English: I serve
- Type: Public
- Established: 1905; 121 years ago
- Affiliations: Cluster University of Jammu
- Principal: Dr. Kaushal Smotra
- Location: Jammu, Jammu and Kashmir, India; 32.7251403°N 74.8520660°E
- Website: www.ggmsciencecollege.in

Gandhi Memorial Science College, commonly known as G.G.M. Science College, formerly Prince of Wales College, established in 1905 is an NAAC accredited "A" grade college located in the city of Jammu, in Jammu and Kashmir, India. The college's undergraduate program provides Bachelor of Science degrees in various subject combinations, which are three-year programs. The school also offers postgraduate education degrees in English and Geology, Bachelor of Computer Application degrees, and certificate courses in the areas of computer applications, web designing and industrial electronics.

== Departments ==
The following are departments of the college.

- Biotechnology
- Botany
- Chemistry
- Computers
- Electronics
- English
- Geography
- Geology
- Library science
- Mathematics
- Physical Education
- Physics
- Zoology

== Heritage status ==
In July 2015, the college was designated as "heritage status" by the University Grants Commission (UGC) of India, which serves to enable funds for school upgrades and improvements.

== Gandhi Memorial Science College Ground ==
Gandhi Memorial Science College Ground
- Interactive map of Gandhi Memorial Science College Ground

Ground information
- Location: Jammu, Jammu and Kashmir
- Country: India
- Establishment: 1976
- Capacity: n.a
- End names
- n/a

Team information
Jammu & Kashmir team	(1976–2013)
- As of 26 August, 2015; Source: ESPNcricinfo

The Gandhi Memorial Science College Ground is a playing ground located at the Govt. Gandhi Memorial Science College. The ground hosts matches for Jammu & Kashmir cricket team. The hosted his first match in 1976 between Jammu & Kashmir and Punjab. Until December 2013, the ground hosted 18 first-class matches.
