= Veer Pratap Singh =

Indian cricketer (born 1992)

Personal information
- Born: 3 May 1992 (age 34); Bihar Sharif, Bihar, India
- Batting: Right-handed
- Bowling: Right-arm medium
- Role: Bowler

Domestic team information
- Years: Team
- 2011-2016: Bengal
- 2012: Deccan Chargers
- 2019-2022: Chhattisgarh
- 2022-present: Bihar

Career statistics
Competition	First-class	T20
Matches	45	22
Runs scored	703	4
Batting average	12.55	1.33
100s/50s	0/2	0/0
Top score	63*	1*
Balls bowled	5,974	450
Wickets	112	19
Bowling average	29.61	33.78
5 wickets in innings	5	0
10 wickets in match	0	0
Best bowling	5/30	2/19
Catches/stumpings	14/0	3/0
- Source: ESPNcricinfo, 24 July 2024

Veer Pratap Singh (born 3 May 1992) is an Indian cricketer who plays first-class cricket for Bihar. He previously played for the Bengal. He is a right-arm medium seam bowler. He was also a member of the Deccan Chargers and Kolkata Knight Riders squads in the Indian Premier League. He was born at Bihar Sharif in Bihar.
