= Dikshanshu Negi =

Indian cricketer (born 1990)

Personal information
- Born: 5 October 1990 (age 36); Uttarakhand, India
- Source: ESPNcricinfo, 25 September 2019

Dikshanshu Negi (born 5 October 1990) is an Indian cricketer. He made his List A debut on 27 September 2019, for Uttarakhand in the 2019–20 Vijay Hazare Trophy. He made his Twenty20 debut on 8 November 2019, for Uttarakhand in the 2019–20 Syed Mushtaq Ali Trophy. He made his first-class debut on 9 December 2019, for Uttarakhand in the 2019–20 Ranji Trophy.
