= Lone Nasir =

Indian cricketer (born 1997)

Personal information
- Full name: Lone Nasir Muzaffar
- Born: 5 September 1997 (age 29); Jammu, India
- Batting: Right handed
- Bowling: Right arm Medium fast

Domestic team information
- Years: Team
- 2020/21–present: Jammu and Kashmir

Career statistics
Competition	FC	LA	T20
Matches	3	7	10
Runs scored	115	170	54
Batting average	23.00	28.33	13.50
100s/50s	0/0	0/1	0/0
Top score	44	72	29*
Balls bowled	144	258	48
Wickets	0	4	2
Bowling average	–	57.25	26.50
5 wickets in innings	0	0	0
10 wickets in match	0	0	0
Best bowling	–	2/27	1/16
Catches/stumpings	0/–	3/–	5/–
- Source: ESPNcricinfo, 9 April 2025

Lone Nasir (born 5 September 1997) is an Indian cricketer. He made his List A debut on 21 February 2021, for Jammu & Kashmir in the 2020–21 Vijay Hazare Trophy.
