= Basant Mohanty =

Indian cricketer (born 1986)

Personal information
- Full name: Basantkumar Chintamani Mohanty
- Born: 24 November 1986 (age 39); Cuttack, Odisha, India
- Batting: Right-handed
- Bowling: Right-arm medium
- Role: Bowler

Domestic team information
- Years: Team
- 2007/08–present: Odisha

Career statistics
| Competition | FC | LA |
|---|---|---|
| Matches | 91 | 31 |
| Runs scored | 646 | 31 |
| Batting average | 14.35 | 31.00 |
| 100s/50s | 0/2 | 0/0 |
| Top score | 60* | 15* |
| Balls bowled | 9190 | 198 |
| Wickets | 354 | 43 |
| Bowling average | 22.34 | 28.40 |
| 5 wickets in innings | 21 | 1 |
| 10 wickets in match | 2 | 0 |
| Best bowling | 7/27 | 5/23 |
| Catches/stumpings | 7/- | 0/- |
- Source: ESPNcricinfo, 23 January 2019

Basant Mohanty (born 24 November 1986) is an Indian cricketer who plays as a medium-pace bowler for Odisha in domestic cricket. He is a right-arm medium-fast bowler and has represented East Zone in Duleep Trophy. He was in the winning team Western Samurai Rourkela in 1st edition of Odisha Premiere League and was in Subarnarekha team in the second season.

He was the leading wicket-taker for Odisha in the 2018–19 Ranji Trophy, with 44 dismissals in eight matches.
