= Rahil Shah =

Indian cricketer (born 1985)

Personal information
- Full name: Rahil Sanjay Shah
- Born: 20 October 1985 (age 41); Surat, Gujarat, India
- Batting: Right-handed
- Bowling: Slow left-arm orthodox
- Role: Bowler

Domestic team information
- Years: Team
- 2011–2019: Tamil Nadu
- 2019–2020: Uttarakhand
- 2021–present: Tripura

Career statistics
| Competition | FC | LA | T20 |
|---|---|---|---|
| Matches | 33 | 50 | 46 |
| Runs scored | 178 | 53 | 36 |
| Batting average | 5.74 | 8.83 | 10.75 |
| 100s/50s | 0/0 | 0/0 | 0/0 |
| Top score | 23 | 7* | 28* |
| Balls bowled | 6,526 | 2472 | 907 |
| Wickets | 112 | 78 | 45 |
| Bowling average | 26.04 | 21.52 | 23.28 |
| 5 wickets in innings | 7 | 1 | 1 |
| 10 wickets in match | 2 | 0 | 0 |
| Best bowling | 7/34 | 6/37 | 5/12 |
| Catches/stumpings | 16/– | 22/– | 17/– |
- Source: Cricinfo, 14 November 2021

Rahil Sanjay Shah (born 20 October 1985) is an Indian cricketer who plays for Tripura. He is a slow left-arm orthodox bowler.
