= Abid Mushtaq =

Indian cricketer (born 1997)

Personal information
- Full name: Abid Mushtaq Mangnoo
- Born: 17 January 1997 (age 29); Doda, Jammu and Kashmir, India
- Role: All Rounder

Domestic team information
- Years: Team
- 2019: Jammu & Kashmir
- 2024: Rajasthan Royals
- Source: ESPNcricinfo, 27 September 2019

Abid Mushtaq (born 17 January 1997) is an Indian cricketer. In December 2023, he was bought by the Rajasthan Royals in the player auction for the 2024 Indian Premier League.

He made his List A debut on 27 September 2019, for Jammu & Kashmir in the 2019–20 Vijay Hazare Trophy. He made his Twenty20 debut on 11 November 2019, for Jammu & Kashmir in the 2019–20 Syed Mushtaq Ali Trophy. He made his first-class debut on 9 December 2019, for Jammu & Kashmir in the 2019–20 Ranji Trophy.
