= Shubham Pundir =

Indian cricketer (born 1998)

Personal information
- Full name: Shubham Singh Pundir
- Born: 16 October 1998 (age 28); Dehradun, Uttarakhand, India
- Batting: Left-handed
- Bowling: Legbreak googly
- Role: Batsman

Domestic team information
- Years: Team
- 2015–present: Jammu and Kashmir

Career statistics
Competition	FC	LA	T20
Matches	28	41	42
Runs scored	1,091	1,007	695
Batting average	25.97	27.97	24.82
100s/50s	2/3	0/8	0/4
Top score	172	96*	68
Catches/stumpings	31/–	15/–	12/–
- Source: Cricinfo, 9 April 2025

Shubham Singh Pundir (born 16 October 1998) is an Indian cricketer who represents Jammu and Kashmir in domestic cricket.

== Domestic career ==
He made his first-class debut for Jammu and Kashmir on 13 January 2015 in the 2014-15 Ranji Trophy. He made his Twenty20 debut for Jammu and Kashmir on 26 March 2015 in the 2014-15 Syed Mushtaq Ali Trophy. He made his List A debut for Jammu and Kashmir in the 2017–18 Vijay Hazare Trophy on 8 February 2018.
