= Shubham Khajuria =

Indian cricketer

Personal information
- Full name: Shubham Khajuria
- Born: 13 September 1995 (age 31); Jammu, Jammu and Kashmir, India
- Batting: Right-handed
- Role: Opening batsman

Domestic team information
- Years: Team
- 2011/12–present: Jammu and Kashmir

Career statistics
Competition	FC	LA	T20
Matches	73	72	47
Runs scored	4,111	2,634	1,124
Batting average	32.88	36.58	27.41
100s/50s	7/25	7/14	0/7
Top score	255	159	85*
Balls bowled	368	156	42
Wickets	6	2	0
Bowling average	33.83	57.00	–
5 wickets in innings	0	0	–
10 wickets in match	0	0	–
Best bowling	3/47	1/1	–
Catches/stumpings	31/–	13/–	13/–
- Source: ESPNcricinfo, 24 December 2025

Shubham Khajuria (born 13 September 1995) is an Indian cricketer who plays for Jammu and Kashmir cricket team. He is a right-handed opening batsman. He played for the India Under-19 cricket team in 2013, becoming only the second cricketer from Jammu and Kashmir to do so. In 2023, he played in great Manchester cricket league for Westhoughton cricket club as their pro scoring 745 runs in 11 league & cup games which included four centuries and two half centuries with an average of 93.13 including a double hundred (212) in his first match and a 37 ball 100 as well breaking the club record.

== Career ==
Khajuria made his first-class debut for Jammu and Kashmir against Maharashtra in November 2011 at the age of 16. He batted at No. 4 in that match and scored 34 and 13. However, he could not cement his place in the team until 2014.

In the first match of 2014–15 Ranji Trophy against Mumbai, Khajuria scored 107 in the first innings, his maiden first-class century, and 78 in the second innings. Jammu and Kashmir went on to win the match by four wickets and Khajuria was awarded man of the match.

In 2018, Khajuria spent time in England, playing in the Ribblesdale League based in the North-West of the country. Khajuria signed as club professional for Oswaldtwistle Immanuel Church Cricket Club, impressing with the bat and making significant contributions with the ball also. Khajuria helped the club secure its first ever league title, scoring 1502 league and cup runs. Khajuria also broke the club record for the most runs by a player for the club, when he made 229 (not out) in a league match. Khajuria stated that this time in England helped him develop his game with respect to playing in very different conditions compared to his native India.

He was the leading run-scorer for Jammu & Kashmir in the 2018–19 Vijay Hazare Trophy, with 236 runs in nine matches.
