= Jammu and Kashmir cricket team =

Indian cricket team

Jammu and Kashmir

Personnel
- Captain: Paras Dogra
- Coach: Ajay Sharma
- Owner: Jammu & Kashmir Cricket Association

Team information
- Founded: 1960
- Home ground: Sher-i-Kashmir Stadium, Srinagar
- Capacity: 12000
- Secondary home ground(s): Maulana Azad Stadium, Jammu

History
- First-class debut: Eastern Punjab in 1960 at Municipal Ground, Jullundur
- Ranji Trophy wins: 1
- Vijay Hazare Trophy wins: 0
- Syed Mushtaq Ali Trophy wins: 0
- Official website: JKCA

The Jammu and Kashmir cricket team is a cricket team based in the Indian union territory of Jammu and Kashmir, run by JKCA. It is in the Elite Group C of the Ranji Trophy. Its main home ground is the Sher-i-Kashmir Stadium in Srinagar, and it also plays at Gandhi Memorial Science College Ground in Jammu.

== History ==
Jammu and Kashmir first took part in the Ranji Trophy in 1959–60. Until recent seasons it had always been one of the weaker teams. Its first victory did not come until the 1982–83 season, when it defeated Services by four wickets. As of mid-February 2026 it had played 335 matches in the competition and won 46 times, against 207 losses.

In recent seasons Jammu and Kashmir has been more successful. In 2013–14, the team qualified for the knockout stage of the Ranji Trophy after a gap of more than 10 years. Placed in Group C, the state team, which last qualified for the knockout stage in 2001–02 season, notched up four outright wins in the league round to pip Goa by .001 points on net run rate for a berth in the quarterfinals. Later in 2015–16, the team led by Parvez Rasool defeated heavyweights Mumbai at Wankhade Stadium. However, in the following seasons, the team again lost the rhythm. In the ongoing 2018–19 season, they won three out of nine games played, finishing at number six in Group C points-table.

Sunil Joshi was the former coach of the team. In 2014, the side tasted early success under him by beating the Ranji giants Mumbai cricket team at Wankhede Stadium in the prelim rounds of Ranji Trophy in 2014–15.

The board appointed Irfan Pathan as mentor cum player of the team ahead of the 2018–19 season. He went to Jammu and Kashmir a few months before the start of domestic season and spent his time with the youngsters there.

Jammu and Kashmir's best season to date came in 2025–26, when they won the Ranji Trophy for the first time in their history. After finishing the league and knockout stages with strong performances, J&K reached the final against Karnataka and secured the title by virtue of a first-innings lead after the match ended in a draw. J&K’s campaign featured key victories over Madhya Pradesh by 56 runs in the quarter-final and Bengal by six wickets in the semi-final, successfully chasing a target of 126 runs. This historic triumph marked the team’s maiden Ranji Trophy championship.

In November 2026, Jammu and Kashmir recorded their first Ranji Trophy win over Delhi, beating them by seven wickets at the Arun Jaitley Stadium in Delhi to end a 57-year wait.

== Honours ==
- Ranji Trophy
  - Winners (1): 2025–26: In the 2025–26 season, Jammu and Kashmir clinched their maiden Ranji Trophy title by defeating Karnataka on the basis of a 291-run first-innings lead in the final held at KSCA Cricket Stadium, Hubballi, with Shubham Pundir's century laying the foundation for the historic victory

== Home grounds ==
- Sher-i-Kashmir Stadium, Srinagar – Hosted 2 ODIs
- Maulana Azad Stadium, Jammu – Hosted one ODI
- Gandhi Memorial Science College Ground, Jammu
- Jammu & Kashmir International Cricket Stadium, Bajalta – Proposed

== Notable players ==
Players from Jammu & Kashmir who have played for India, along with year of debut:

- Parvez Rasool (2017)
- Umran Malik (2022)
- Auqib Nabi (2026)

Prominent players without international cap

- Abdul Rauf (1960–1978)
- Mohiuddin Mirza (1961–1979)
- Mehboob Iqbal (1970–1983)
- Vidhya Bhaskar (1982–2001)
- Abdul Qayoom (1985–2002)
- Ashwani Gupta (1986–2004)
- Sanjay Sharma (1988–2004)
- Kavaljit Singh (1990–2008)
- Vijay Sharma (1993–2008)
- Surendra Singh (1997–2004) – Was among the Indian probables for the series against Australia in 2001
- Dhruv Mahajan (1998–2012) – Played in the ICL for Delhi Jets
- Sameer Khajuria (20012010)
- Hardeep Singh (20012015)
- Samiullah Beigh (2002–2017) – Most successful pacer in Ranji Trophy (155 wkts)
- Abid Nabi (2004–2017) – He considered as one of the fastest bowlers in India.
- Ian Dev Singh (2007–2023) – He is the highest run scorer for J&K in Ranji Trophy and T20s. He has played the highest number of matches for J&K in Ranji Trophy. Recently, he also played domestic cricket in Sri Lanka becoming the only International First class player from JKCA. He has played for India Green, Indian Board President's XI, Jammu & Kashmir, Kandy Customs Cricket Club, North Zone, Rest of India. He scored 145 in his debut match for North Zone in Duleep Trophy becoming the First in the state to score century in Duleep Trophy debut.
- Ram Dayal (2008–2022) – Most successful pacer in Ranji Trophy (155 wkts)
- Shubham Khajuria (2008–present) – Played for India u19
- Abid Mushtaq (2019–present) – Was part of Rajasthan Royals in IPL
- Mithun Manhas He is a player in the Indian Premier League represented the Delhi Daredevils in the fourth season of IPL. In the seventh season of the Indian Premier League, he was contracted by the Chennai Super Kings.
- Rasikh Salam He recently became the third cricketer from Jammu and Kashmir to get an IPL bid.
- Abdul Samad He became the third J&K cricketer to make debut in IPL.

== Squad ==
- Players with international caps are listed in **bold**.

Name	Birth date	Batting style	Bowling style	Notes
Batters
Shubham Khajuria	13 September 1995 (age 31)	Right-handed	Right-arm off break	**Vice-captain**
Abdul Samad	28 October 2001 (age 25)	Right-handed	Right-arm leg break	Plays for **Lucknow Super Giants** in IPL
Yawer Hassan	12 April 2003 (age 23)	Right-handed	Right-arm medium	
Paras Dogra	19 November 1984 (age 41)	Right-handed	Right-arm medium	**Captain**
Qamran Iqbal	17 October 2001 (age 25)	Right-handed	Right-arm leg break	
Vivrant Sharma	30 October 1999 (age 27)	Left-handed	Right-arm leg break	
Kawalpreet Singh	6 May 2002 (age 24)	Right-handed	Right-arm off break	
Shubham Pundir	16 October 1998 (age 28)	Right-handed	Right-arm leg break googly	
All-Rounders
Sahil Lotra	28 October 1998 (age 28)	Right-handed	Right-arm off break	
Lone Nasir	5 September 1997 (age 29)	Right-handed	Right-arm medium	
Wicket-keepers
Kanhaiya Wadhawan	27 September 2001 (age 25)	Right-handed		
Rydham Sharma	14 December 2004 (age 21)	Right-handed		
Dikshant Kundal	21 April 2002 (age 24)	Right-handed		
Spin Bowlers
Abid Mushtaq	17 January 1997 (age 29)	Left-handed	Slow left-arm orthodox	
Vanshaj Sharma	11 August 2003 (age 23)	Left-handed	Slow left-arm orthodox	
Pace Bowlers
**Auqib Nabi**	4 November 1996 (age 30)	Right-handed	Right-arm medium	Plays for **Delhi Capitals** in IPL
Yudhvir Charak	13 September 1997 (age 29)	Right-handed	Right-arm medium-fast	
Sunil Kumar	11 March 1997 (age 29)	Right-handed	Left-arm medium	
**Umran Malik**	22 November 1999 (age 26)	Right-handed	Right-arm fast	Plays for **Kolkata Knight Riders** in IPL
Umar Nazir Mir	3 December 1993 (age 32)	Right-handed	Right-arm medium-fast	
Rohit Sharma	5 September 1994 (age 32)	Right-handed	Right-arm medium-fast	
Brijesh Sharma	16 December 1998 (age 27)	Right-handed	Right-arm medium-fast	Plays for **Rajasthan Royals** in IPL

Updated as on 17 November 2026.

== See also ==
- Sports in Jammu and Kashmir
