= 2019–20 Ranji Trophy =

Cricket tournament

- The Ranji Trophy, awarded to the winners
- Dates: 9 December 2019 – 13 March 2020
- Administrator: BCCI
- Cricket format: First-class cricket
- Tournament format: Round-robin then knockout
- Host: India
- Champions: Saurashtra (1st title)
- Participants: 38
- Matches: 169
- Most runs: Rahul Dalal (1,340) (Arunachal Pradesh)
- Most wickets: Jaydev Unadkat (67) (Saurashtra)

The 2019–20 Ranji Trophy was the 86th season of the Ranji Trophy, the premier first-class cricket tournament in India. It took place between December 2019 and March 2020. Chandigarh competed in the Ranji Trophy for the first time. Vidarbha were the defending champions.

In the opening round of fixtures, Vidarbha's Wasim Jaffer became the first cricketer to play in 150 matches in the Ranji Trophy. In January 2020, in the round seven match between Madhya Pradesh and Uttar Pradesh, Madhya Pradesh's Ravi Yadav became the first bowler to take a hat-trick in his first over on his debut in a first-class cricket match. On 12 February 2020, the Plate Group fixture between Chandigarh and Manipur was the 60,000th first-class cricket match to be played.

Ahead of the final round of group stage matches, Gujarat, Saurashtra and Andhra had qualified for the quarter-finals, with fourteen teams in contention for the remaining five places. Goa qualified from the Plate Group, after beating Mizoram inside two days. Following the final group stage games, Bengal from Group A, Karnataka from Group B, Jammu & Kashmir from Group C, and Odisha, also from Group C, had all qualified for the quarter-finals. Bengal, Gujarat, Karnataka and Saurashtra all progressed from the quarter-finals to the semi-finals of the tournament.

Bengal reached the final for the first time since the 2006–07 tournament, after beating Karnataka by 174 runs. Saurashtra beat Gujarat by 92 runs to advance to the final for the fourth time in the last eight seasons. The final finished in a draw, with Saurashtra winning their maiden title, with a lead in the first innings of the match.

== Format ==
The tournament retained the same format as the previous edition of the competition. The tournament had four groups, with nine teams each in Groups A, B, and ten teams in Group C and the Plate Group. The top two teams from Group C and the top team in the Plate Group progressed to the quarter-finals of the tournament, along with the top five teams across Groups A and B. A neutral curator was appointed to select the wicket for each fixture.

In July 2019, the Board of Control for Cricket in India (BCCI) considered the use of the Decision Review System (DRS) for matches in the knockout section of the tournament. The BCCI agreed to use a "limited DRS" system, which does not use Hawk-Eye and UltraEdge.

== Player transfers ==
The following player transfers were approved ahead of the season. The new team, Chandigarh, transferred few players from Punjab and Himachal Pradesh.

Player	From	To
Stuart Binny	Karnataka	Nagaland
Unmukt Chand	Delhi	Uttarakhand
C. M. Gautam	Karnataka	Goa
Arun Karthik	Kerala	Pondicherry
Abrar Kazi	Nagaland	Mizoram
Milind Kumar	Sikkim	Tripura
Vinay Kumar	Karnataka	Pondicherry
Shrikant Mundhe	Maharashtra	Nagaland
K. B. Pawan	Nagaland	Mizoram
Malolan Rangarajan	Uttarakhand	Tamil Nadu
Rahil Shah	Tamil Nadu	Uttarakhand
Yashpal Singh	Manipur	Sikkim
Dwaraka Ravi Teja	Andhra	Meghalaya
Robin Uthappa	Saurashtra	Kerala

== Teams ==
The teams were placed in the following groups, based on their performance from the previous edition. Chandigarh competed in the tournament for the first time.

Group A

- Andhra
- Bengal
- Delhi
- Gujarat
- Hyderabad
- Kerala
- Punjab
- Rajasthan
- Vidarbha

Group B

- Baroda
- Himachal Pradesh
- Karnataka
- Madhya Pradesh
- Mumbai
- Railways
- Saurashtra
- Tamil Nadu
- Uttar Pradesh

Group C

- Assam
- Chhattisgarh
- Haryana
- Jammu & Kashmir
- Jharkhand
- Maharashtra
- Odisha
- Services
- Tripura
- Uttarakhand

Plate Group

- Arunachal Pradesh
- Bihar
- Chandigarh
- Goa
- Manipur
- Meghalaya
- Mizoram
- Nagaland
- Pondicherry
- Sikkim

== League stage ==
=== Group A ===
Pos	Team	Pld	W	L	D	T	NR	Pts	Quot
1	Gujarat	8	5	0	3	0	0	35	1.235
2	Bengal	8	4	1	3	0	0	32	1.470
5	Andhra	8	4	2	2	0	0	27	1.175
6	Punjab	8	3	3	2	0	0	24	1.280
7	Vidarbha	8	2	2	4	0	0	21	1.159
8	Delhi	8	2	1	5	0	0	21	1.007
12	Rajasthan	8	2	4	2	0	0	17	0.842
17	Kerala	8	1	5	2	0	0	10	0.772
18	Hyderabad	8	1	6	1	0	0	7	0.509

- Top five teams across Groups A and B advance to the knockout stage.
- Bottom two teams across Groups A and B relegated to the Elite Group C for the next season.

=== Group B ===
Pos	Team	Pld	W	L	D	T	NR	Pts	Quot
3	Karnataka	8	4	0	4	0	0	31	1.042
4	Saurashtra	8	3	1	4	0	0	31	1.239
9	Tamil Nadu	8	2	2	4	0	0	20	1.146
10	Uttar Pradesh	8	2	1	5	0	0	20	1.093
11	Himachal Pradesh	8	2	1	5	0	0	19	0.987
13	Mumbai	8	1	2	5	0	0	17	1.195
14	Railways	8	1	4	3	0	0	16	0.864
15	Baroda	8	2	4	2	0	0	14	0.670
16	Madhya Pradesh	8	0	2	6	0	0	12	0.888

- Top five teams across Groups A and B advance to the knockout stage.
- Bottom two teams across Groups A and B relegated to the Elite Group C for the next season.

=== Group C ===
Team	Pld	W	L	D	T	NR	Pts	Quot
Jammu & Kashmir	9	6	1	2	0	0	39	1.467
Odisha	9	5	2	2	0	0	38	1.214
Haryana	9	5	2	2	0	0	36	1.272
Services	9	5	2	2	0	0	36	1.042
Maharashtra	9	5	3	1	0	0	34	1.105
Jharkhand	9	3	3	3	0	0	24	0.916
Chhattisgarh	9	2	2	5	0	0	23	1.342
Assam	9	1	4	4	0	0	15	0.714
Tripura	9	0	6	3	0	0	9	0.820
Uttarakhand	9	0	7	2	0	0	2	0.536

- Top two teams advances to the knockout stage and are promoted to the Elite Groups A and B for the next season.
- Bottom ranked team is relegated to the Plate Group for the next season.

=== Plate Group ===
Team	Pld	W	L	D	T	NR	Pts	Quot
Goa	9	7	0	2	0	0	50	2.343
Pondicherry	9	7	1	1	0	0	48	2.336
Chandigarh	9	4	0	5	0	0	43	3.498
Meghalaya	9	5	3	1	0	0	34	1.302
Bihar	9	3	1	5	0	0	30	1.191
Nagaland	9	2	3	4	0	0	19	0.765
Manipur	9	2	7	0	0	0	12	0.397
Mizoram	9	1	6	2	0	0	12	0.424
Sikkim	9	1	5	3	0	0	11	0.705
Arunachal Pradesh	9	0	6	3	0	0	3	0.458

- Top team advances to the knockout stage and gets promoted to Elite Group C for the next season.

== Knockout stage ==
Quarterfinals
A1	Gujarat	602/8d & 199/6d
P1	Goa	173 & 164
B2	Saurashtra	419 & 426
A3	Andhra	136 & 149/4
B1	Karnataka	206 & 316
C1	Jammu & Kashmir	192 & 163
A2	Bengal	332 & 373
C2	Odisha	250 & 39/0

Semifinals
A1	Gujarat	252 & 234
B2	Saurashtra	304 & 274
B1	Karnataka	122 & 177
A2	Bengal	312 & 161

Final
B2	Saurashtra	425 & 105/4
A2	Bengal	381

=== Quarter-finals ===
20–24 February 2020
1st Quarter-final
Scorecard

Gujarat	v	Goa
602/8d (161.3 overs); Parthiv Patel 124 (172); Felix Alemao 3/86 (28 overs)		173 (57.5 overs); Amit Verma 56 (87); Chintan Gaja 5/19 (13.5 overs)
199/6d (64.2 overs); Samit Gohel 72 (151); Lakshay Garg 4/30 (11 overs)		164 (66.4 overs); Suyash Prabhudessai 66 (135); Siddharth Desai 5/81 (19.4 overs)

Gujarat won by 464 runs
Sardar Vallabhai Patel Stadium, Valsad
Umpires: Chirra Ravikanthreddy and C. K. Nandan
Player of the match: Roosh Kalaria (Gujarat)

- Gujarat won the toss and elected to bat.

20–24 February 2020
2nd Quarter-final
Scorecard

Bengal	v	Odisha
332 (96.5 overs); Anustup Majumdar 157 (239); Basant Mohanty 4/53 (25.5 overs)		250 (102.1 overs); Debasish Samantray 68 (145); Nilkantha Das 3/43 (21 overs)
373 (138 overs); Shreevats Goswami 78 (134); Govinda Poddar 3/95 (31 overs)		39/0 (10 overs); Anurag Sarangi 24* (39)

Match drawn
DRIEMS Ground, Cuttack
Umpires: Sai Darshan Kumar and Abhijit Deshmukh
Player of the match: Anustup Majumdar (Bengal)

- Odisha won the toss and elected to field.
- Kanwar Singh Chohan (Odisha) made his first-class debut.
- Bengal advanced to the semi-finals due to a first-innings lead.

20–24 February 2020
3rd Quarter-final
Scorecard

Karnataka	v	Jammu & Kashmir
206 (69.1 overs); Krishnamurthy Siddharth 76 (189); Parvez Rasool 3/36 (12.1 overs)		192 (62.4 overs); Shubham Khajuria 62 (155); Prasidh Krishna 4/42 (11.4 overs)
316 (106.5 overs); Krishnamurthy Siddharth 98 (177); Abid Mushtaq 6/83 (34.5 overs)		163 (44.4 overs); Shubham Pundir 31 (59); Krishnappa Gowtham 7/54 (18.4 overs)

Karnataka won by 167 runs
Gandhi Memorial Science College Ground, Jammu
Umpires: Ulhas Gandhe and Pashchim Pathak
Player of the match: Krishnamurthy Siddharth (Karnataka)

- Karnataka won the toss and elected to bat.
- Only six overs were bowled on day 1 and no play was possible on day 2 due to rain.

20–24 February 2020
4th Quarter-final
Scorecard

Saurashtra	v	Andhra
419 (146.5 overs); Chirag Jani 121 (297); Prithvi Raj 3/51 (20 overs)		136 (68.2 overs); Chengalpet Gnaneshwar 43 (166); Jaydev Unadkat 4/42 (18.2 overs)
426 (138 overs); Prerak Mankad 85 (116); Jyothi Krishna 4/74 (28 overs)		149/4 (51 overs); Srikar Bharat 55* (69); Prerak Mankad 2/8 (7 overs)

Match drawn
CSR Sharma College Ground, Ongole
Umpires: Nitin Pandit and Vineet Kulkarni
Player of the match: Chirag Jani (Saurashtra)

- Andhra won the toss and elected to field.
- Saurashtra advanced to the semi-finals due to a first-innings lead.

=== Semi-finals ===
29 February – 4 March 2020
1st Semi-final
Scorecard

Saurashtra	v	Gujarat
304 (127.4 overs); Sheldon Jackson 103 (204); Arzan Nagwaswalla 5/81 (29 overs)		252 (87.3 overs); Rujul Bhatt 71 (212); Jaydev Unadkat 3/86 (24 overs)
274 (98.4 overs); Arpit Vasavada 139 (230); Chintan Gaja 7/71 (23 overs)		234 (72.2 overs); Chirag Gandhi 96 (139); Jaydev Unadkat 7/56 (22.2 overs)

Saurashtra won by 92 runs
Saurashtra Cricket Association Stadium, Rajkot
Umpires: Rohan Pandit and Sundaram Ravi
Player of the match: Arpit Vasavada (Saurashtra)

- Gujarat won the toss and elected to field.

29 February – 4 March 2020
2nd Semi-final
Scorecard

Bengal	v	Karnataka
312 (92 overs); Anustup Majumdar 149* (207); Ronit More 3/52 (17 overs)		122 (36.2 overs); Krishnappa Gowtham 31 (24); Ishan Porel 5/39 (13 overs)
161 (54.4 overs); Sudip Chatterjee 45 (94); Abhimanyu Mithun 4/23 (16 overs)		177 (55.3 overs); Devdutt Padikkal 62 (129); Mukesh Kumar 6/61 (21 overs)

Bengal won by 174 runs
Eden Gardens, Kolkata
Umpires: Yeshwant Barde and Krishnamachari Srinivasan
Player of the match: Anustup Majumdar (Bengal)

- Karnataka won the toss and elected to field.

=== Final ===
9–13 March 2020
Final
Scorecard

Saurashtra	v	Bengal
425 (171.5 overs); Arpit Vasavada 106 (287); Akash Deep 4/98 (35 overs)		381 (161 overs); Sudip Chatterjee 81 (241); Dharmendrasinh Jadeja 3/114 (52 overs)
105/4 (34 overs); Avi Barot 39 (102); Shahbaz Ahmed 2/32 (14 overs)

Match drawn
Saurashtra Cricket Association Stadium, Rajkot
Umpires: K. N. Ananthapadmanabhan, Chettithody Shamshuddin and Yeshwant Barde
Player of the match: Arpit Vasavada (Saurashtra)

- Saurashtra won the toss and elected to bat.
- Sudip Kumar Gharami (Bengal) made his first-class debut.
- Umpire Chettithody Shamshuddin was injured on the first day of the final and was replaced by Yeshwant Barde.
