= 2016–17 Inter-State Twenty20 Tournament =

Indian cricket tournament

The 2016–17 Inter-State Twenty20 Tournament was a Twenty20 tournament held in India for one season only. The BCCI decided to convert the Syed Mushtaq Ali Trophy into a five-zone tournament for the teams which play in the Duleep Trophy. The 28 state teams were transferred to the Inter-State T20 but on a zonal basis only, so there was no national title available. The winners of the five zonal titles were Madhya Pradesh (Central), Bengal (East), Delhi (North), Karnataka (South), and Mumbai (West). The matches were played from 29 January to 6 February 2017. Squads and points tables for each zone are listed below.

== Central Zone ==
=== Squads ===
| Chhattisgarh | Madhya pradesh | Railways | Rajasthan | Uttar Pradesh | Vidarbha |
|---|---|---|---|---|---|
| Mohammad Kaif (c); Abhimanyu Chauhan; Abhishek Tamrakar; Ajay Mandal; Amandeep Khare; Avnish Dhaliwal; Kant Singh; Manoj Singh (wk); Omkar Verma; Pankaj Kumar Rao; Sahil Gupta; Shakeeb Ahmed; Shubham Agarwal; Sumit Ruikar; Vishal Kushwah | Naman Ojha (c & wk); Ankit Kushwah; Ankit Sharma; Anshul Tripathi; Anand Bais; Ankit Dane; Ashwin Das; Dharmesh Patel; Harpreet Singh; Ishwar Pandey; Mukul Raghav; Parth Sahani; Puneet Datey; Saransh Jain; Sohraab Dhaliwal; Venkatesh Iyer | Karn Sharma (c); Amit Mishra; Anureet Singh; Ashish Singh; Avinash Yadav; Deepak Bansal; Faiz Ahmed; Hemant Singh; Mahesh Rawat (wk); Manish Rao; Manjeet Singh; Pappu Singh; Rongsen Jonathan; Saurabh Wakaskar; Shivakant Shukla | Pankaj Singh (c); Aniket Choudhary; Ankit Lamba; Arjit Gupta; Ashok Bhudania; Chandrapal Singh; Deepak Chahar; Dishant Yagnik (wk); Divya Pratap Singh; Khaleel Ahmed; Mahipal Lomror; Nathu Singh; Puneet Yadav; Rajesh Bishnoi; Tajinder Singh | Akshdeep Nath; Amit Mishra; Ankit Rajpoot; Deependra Pandey; Eklavya Dwivedi (wk); Imtiaz Ahmed; Kuldeep Yadav; Mohd Israr; Piyush Chawla; Prashant Gupta; Praveen Kumar; Rinku Singh; Samarth Singh; Sarfaraz Khan; Saurabh Kumar; Shivam Chaudhary; Umang Sharma | Faiz Fazal (c); Akshay Karnewar; Akshay Wakhare; Ambati Rayudu; Apoorv Wankhade; Ganesh Satish; Jitesh Sharma (wk); Lalit Yadav; Rajneesh Gurbani; Ravi Jangid; Ravikumar Thakur; Rushabh Rathod; Shrikant Wagh; Siddhesh Wath; Urvesh Patel |

=== Points Table ===
| Team | Pld | W | L | T | NR | Pts | NRR |
|---|---|---|---|---|---|---|---|
| Madhya Pradesh | 5 | 5 | 0 | 0 | 0 | 20 | 0.738 |
| Rajasthan | 5 | 3 | 2 | 0 | 0 | 12 | 0.420 |
| Vidarbha | 5 | 3 | 2 | 0 | 0 | 12 | -0.042 |
| Chhattisgarh | 5 | 2 | 3 | 0 | 0 | 8 | -0.124 |
| Railways | 5 | 1 | 4 | 0 | 0 | 4 | 0.378 |
| Uttar Pradesh | 5 | 1 | 4 | 0 | 0 | 4 | -1.405 |

== East Zone ==
=== Squads ===
| Assam | Bengal | Jharkhand | Odisha | Tripura |
|---|---|---|---|---|
| Arun Karthik (c); Swarupam Purkayastha (vc); Abu Nechim; Amit Verma; Arup Das; Jamaluddin Syed Mohammad; Jitumoni Kalita; Mrinmoy Dutta; Pritam Das; Pritam Debnath; Pallavkumar Das; Rishav Das; Riyan Parag; Sibsankar Roy; Wasiqur Rahman (wk) | Manoj Tiwary (c); Abhimanyu Easwaran; Abhishek Raman; Ashok Dinda; Debabrata Das; Kanishk Seth; Pankaj Shaw; Pragyan Ojha; Pramod Chandila; Sayan Ghosh; Shreevats Goswami (wk); Veer Pratap Singh; Wriddhiman Saha (wk); Writtick Chatterjee | Saurabh Tiwary (c); Ishan Kishan (wk); Ishank Jaggi; Jaskaran Singh; Kaushal Singh; Kumar Deobrat; Monu Kumar; Prakash Seet; Pratyush Singh; Rahul Shukla; Shahbaz Nadeem; Shasheem Rathour; Sonu Singh; Sumit Kumar; Virat Singh | Biplab Samantray (c); Abhilash Mallick; Abhishek Yadav; Anurag Sarangi; Aravind Singh; Basant Mohanty; Deepak Behera; Dhiraj Singh; Soumendra Das; Paresh Patel; Prayash Singh; Sandeep Pattnaik; Saurabh Rawat (wk); Subhranshu Senapati; Suryakant Pradhan | Manisankar Murasingh (c); Abhijit Sarkar; Arjun Debnath; Bishal Ghosh; Bunti Roy; Gurinder Singh; Joydeep Bhattacharjee; Kaushal Acharjee; Nirupam Sen (wk); Rajat Dey; Rajesh Banik; Samrat Singha; Sanjay Majumder; Smit Patel (wk); Udiyan Bose |

=== Points Table ===
| Team | Pld | W | L | T | NR | Pts | NRR |
|---|---|---|---|---|---|---|---|
| Bengal | 4 | 4 | 0 | 0 | 0 | 16 | 0.927 |
| Assam | 4 | 3 | 1 | 0 | 0 | 12 | 0.751 |
| Odisha | 4 | 2 | 2 | 0 | 0 | 8 | -0.308 |
| Tripura | 4 | 1 | 3 | 0 | 0 | 4 | -0.629 |
| Jharhand | 4 | 0 | 4 | 0 | 0 | 0 | -0.679 |

== North Zone ==
=== Squads ===
| Delhi | Haryana | Himachal | J & K | Punjab | Services |
|---|---|---|---|---|---|
| Gautam Gambhir (c); Arjun Gupta (wk); Ishant Sharma; Kshitiz Sharma; Manan Sharma; Milind Kumar; Navdeep Saini; Nitish Rana; Pawan Negi; Pradeep Sangwan; Sarthak Ranjan; Shikhar Dhawan; Suboth Bhati; Unmukt Chand; Vikas Tokas | Mohit Sharma (c); Ashish Hooda; Chaitanya Bishnoi; Harshal Patel; Jayant Yadav; Joginder Sharma; Mohit Hooda; Mohit Kalyan; Nitin Saini (wk); Rahul Tewatia; Rajat Paliwal; Rohit Sharma; Sanjay Pahal; Shubham Rohilla; Shivam Chauhan; Virender Dahiya | Bipul Sharma (c); Abhimanyu Rana; Akshay Chauhan; Amit Kumar; Ankit Kaushik; Ankush Bains (wk); Kanwar Abhinay; Mayank Dagar; Pankaj Jaiswal; Paras Dogra; Prashant Chopra; Rahul Singh; Rishi Dhawan; Sumeet Verma; Vinay Galetiya | Ian Dev Singh (c/wk); Abid Nabi; Ahmed Bandy; Jatin Wadhwan; Manik Gupta; Mithun Manhas; Mohsin Mufti; Pranav Gupta; Ram Dayal; Sahil Sharma; Shubham Khajuria; Umar Nazir Mir; Waseem Raza | Harbhajan Singh (c); Anmol Malhotra; Anmolpreet Singh; Baltej Singh; Gurkeerat Singh Mann; Jaskaranvir Singh (wk); Manan Vohra; Manpreet Gony; Nikhil Chaudhary; Pargat Singh; Rahul Sharma; Ramandeep Singh; Sandeep Sharma; Sharad Lumba; Siddarth Kaul; Varun Khanna | Anshul Gupta (c); Amit Pachhara; Avishek Sinha; Devender Lohchab; Diwesh Pathania; Hardik Sethi; Lakhan Singh; Mumtaz Qadir; Nakul Verma (wk); Nishan Singh; Rahul Kanojia; Rahul Singh; Raushan Raj; Ravi Chauhan; Sachidanand Pandey; Sachin Shinde; Shakti Malviya; Sufiyan Alam; Sumit Singh; Swapnil More; Vikas Hathwala |

=== Points Table ===
| Team | Pld | W | L | T | NR | Pts | NRR |
|---|---|---|---|---|---|---|---|
| Delhi | 5 | 3 | 2 | 0 | 0 | 12 | 0.239 |
| Jammu and Kashmir | 5 | 3 | 3 | 0 | 0 | 12 | 0.168 |
| Punjab | 5 | 3 | 2 | 0 | 0 | 12 | -0.369 |
| Haryana | 5 | 2 | 2 | 0 | 0 | 8 | 0.513 |
| Himachal Pradesh | 5 | 2 | 3 | 0 | 0 | 8 | 0.040 |
| Services | 5 | 2 | 3 | 0 | 0 | 8 | -0.717 |

== South Zone ==
=== Squads ===
| Andhra | Goa | Hyderabad | Karnataka | Kerala | Tamil Nadu |
|---|---|---|---|---|---|
| Hanuma Vihari (c); Ashwin Hebbar; Bandaru Ayyappa; Bhargav Bhatt; Cheepurapalli Stephen; Dasari Swaroop Kumar; Dwaraka Ravi Teja; Girinath Reddy; Karthik Raman; Kunnala Bhimarao; KV Sasikanth; Prasanth Kumar; Ricky Bhui; Shoaib Md Khan; Sirla Srinivas; Srikar Bharat (wk) | Sagun Kamat (c); Amit Yadav; Amogh Sunil Desai; Amulaya Pandrekar; Darshan Misal; Deepraj Gaonkar; Ganeshraj Narvekar (wk); Gauresh Gawas; Keenan Vaz; Rituraj Singh; Saurabh Bandekar; Shadab Jakati; Sher Yadav; Snehal Kauthankar; Swapnil Asnodkar | S Badrinath (c); Akash Bhandari; Akshath Reddy; Annabathula Akash; Balchander Anirudh; Bavanaka Sandeep; Chama Milind; Himalay Agarwal; Kolla Sumanth (wk); Mehdi Hasan; Mohammed Siraj; Palakodeti Sairam; Ravi Kiran; Ravi Teja; Sharadh Mudiraj (wk); Tanmay Agarwal | Vinay Kumar (c); Karun Nair (vc); Aniruddha Joshi; Chidhambaram Gautam (wk); Jagadeesha Suchith; KC Cariappa; Krishnappa Gowtham; Mayank Agarwal; Mohammed Taha; Pavan Deshpande; Ravikumar Samarth; Shishir Bhavane; Sreenath Aravind; Stalin Hoover; Stuart Binny; T Pradeep | Sachin Baby (c); Sandeep Warrier (vc); Basil Thampi; Fabid Ahmed; Iqbal Abdulla; Jalaj Saxena; Mohammed Azharuddeen (wk); Padmanabhan Prasanth; Raiphi Gomez; Rohan Kunnummal; Rohan Prem; Sanju Samson; Unnikrishnan Manukrishnan; Vinod Kumar; Vishnu Vinod | Vijay Shankar (c); Abhinav Mukund; Aswin Crist; Baba Aparajith; Baba Indrajith; Dinesh Karthik (wk); Kaushik Gandhi; Krishnamoorthy Vignesh; Murali Vijay; Murugan Ashwin; Narayan Jagadeesan (wk); R Sanjay Yadav; Rahil Shah; Rajagopal Sathish; S Harish Kumar; Srikkanth Anirudha; T Natarajan |

=== Points Table ===
| Team | Pld | W | L | T | NR | Pts | NRR |
|---|---|---|---|---|---|---|---|
| Karnataka | 5 | 4 | 1 | 0 | 0 | 16 | 1.363 |
| Tamil Nadu | 5 | 4 | 1 | 0 | 0 | 16 | 0.314 |
| Hyderabad | 5 | 3 | 2 | 0 | 0 | 12 | 1.030 |
| Kerala | 5 | 2 | 3 | 0 | 0 | 8 | 0.825 |
| Andhra | 5 | 2 | 3 | 0 | 0 | 8 | -0.725 |
| Goa | 5 | 0 | 5 | 0 | 0 | 0 | -3.312 |

== West Zone ==
=== Squads ===
| Baroda | Gujarat | Maharashtra | Mumbai | Saurashtra |
|---|---|---|---|---|
| Irfan Pathan (c); Deepak Hooda (vc); Abhijit Karambelkar; Aditya Waghmode; Babashafi Pathan; Kedar Devdhar; Miten Shah (wk); Monil Patel; Munaf Patel; Murtuja Vahora; Rishi Arothe; Soaeb Tai; Swapnil Singh; Vishnu Solanki; Yusuf Pathan | Abdulahad Malek (wk); Chintan Gaja; Chirag Gandhi; Dhruv Raval; Hardik Patel; Himalaya Barad; Hiten Mehra; Ishwar Chaudhary; Jesal Karia; Karan Patel; Manprit Juneja; Mohit Thadani; Rohit Dahiya; Rujul Bhatt | Swapnil Gugale (c); Ankit Bawne; Anupam Sanklecha; Domnic Muthuswami; Jagdish Zope; Naushad Shaikh; Nikhil Naik (wk); Pradeep Dadhe; Prayag Bhati; Ruturaj Gaikwad; Satyajeet Bachhav; Shamshuzama Kazi; Taranjit Singh; Vijay Zol | Aditya Tare (c & wk); Abhishek Nayar; Aditya Dhumal; Ajinkya Rahane; Armaan Jaffer; Eknath Kerkar; Jay Bista; Prathamesh Dake; Pravin Tambe; Rakesh Prabhu; Rohan Raje; Sairaj Patil; Shashank Singh; Shivam Dube; Shreyas Iyer | Jaydev Shah (c); Cheteshwar Pujara; Chirag Jani; Deepak Punia; Dharmendrasinh Jadeja; Jaydev Unadkat; Kishan Parmar; Kushang Patel; Prerak Mankad; Rajdeep Darbar; Samarth Vyas; Shaurya Sanandia; Sheldon Jackson (wk); Sunil Yadav; Vandit Jivrajani |

=== Points Table ===
| Team | Pld | W | L | T | NR | Pts | NRR |
|---|---|---|---|---|---|---|---|
| Mumbai | 4 | 4 | 0 | 0 | 0 | 16 | 0.528 |
| Baroda | 4 | 2 | 2 | 0 | 0 | 8 | 0.210 |
| Gujarat | 4 | 2 | 2 | 0 | 0 | 8 | 0.099 |
| Maharashtra | 4 | 2 | 2 | 0 | 0 | 8 | -0.098 |
| Saurashtra | 4 | 0 | 4 | 0 | 0 | 0 | -0.718 |
