= 2014–15 Hyderabad C.A. season =

Hyderabad C.A.
2014–15 season
- Coach: Abdul Azeem (Senior men's); Abdul Bari Wahab (Senior women's)
- Captain: Dwaraka Ravi Teja (Senior men's); M Shalini (Senior women's)
- Ground(s): Rajiv Gandhi International Cricket Stadium, Hyderabad (Capacity: 55,000)
- Vijay Hazare Trophy: South Zone (6th)
- One-Day League: Elite Group A (5th)
- Ranji Trophy: Group C (5th)
- T20 League: Elite Group B (4th)
- Syed Mushtaq Ali Trophy: Super League Group B (5th)

The 2014–15 season is Hyderabad cricket team's 81st competitive season. The Hyderabad cricket team and Hyderabad women's cricket team are senior men's and women's domestic cricket teams based in the city of Hyderabad, India, run by the Hyderabad Cricket Association. They represent the state of Telangana in domestic competitions.

== Competition overview ==
Category	Competition	Format	First match	Last match	Final position	Pld	W	L	D / T / NR	Win %
Senior men's	Vijay Hazare Trophy	List A cricket	7 November 2014	13 November 2014	Zonal Stage	5	1	4	0	20%
Senior women's	One-Day League	Women's List A cricket	6 December 2014	14 December 2014	Elite Group Stage	4	1	3	0	25%
Senior men's	Ranji Trophy	First-class cricket	7 December 2014	6 February 2015	Group Stage	8	1	1	6	12.50%
Senior women's	T20 League	Women's Twenty20 cricket	11 January 2015	13 January 2015	Elite Group Stage	4	1	3	0	25%
Senior men's	Syed Mushtaq Ali Trophy	Twenty20 cricket	25 March 2015	5 April 2015	Super League Stage	9	4	5	0	44.44%

== Senior Men's team ==
=== Squads ===
- Head coach: Abdul Azeem
- Assistant coach : Noel David
- Fielding Coach : NS Ganesh

Vijay Hazare Trophy	Ranji Trophy	Syed Mushtaq Ali Trophy
Pragyan Ojha (c); Dwaraka Ravi Teja; Habeeb Ahmed (wk); Tanmay Agarwal; Ashish Reddy; Akash Bhandari; Mehdi Hasan; Chama Milind; Praneeth Kumar; Danny Dereck Prince; Syed Quadri; Ravi Kiran; Akshath Reddy; Tirumalasetti Suman; Hanuma Vihari	Dwaraka Ravi Teja (c); Akshath Reddy; Habeeb Ahmed (wk); Tanmay Agarwal; Balchander Anirudh; Ashish Reddy; A I Harrsha; Mehdi Hasan; Ibrahim Khaleel (wk); Chama Milind; Pragyan Ojha; Syed Quadri; Ravi Kiran; Tirumalasetti Suman; Hanuma Vihari; Akash Bhandari	Hanuma Vihari (c); Habeeb Ahmed (wk); Tanmay Agarwal; Ashish Reddy; Akash Bhandari; Chama Milind; Pagadala Naidu; Pragyan Ojha; Praneeth Kumar; Danny Dereck Prince; Ravi Kiran; Akshath Reddy; Bavanaka Sandeep; Tirumalasetti Suman; Benjamin Thomas

Duleep Trophy

Pragyan Ojha, Dwaraka Ravi Teja and Hanuma Vihari got selected for South Zone squad for 2014-15 Duleep Trophy, a first-class cricket tournament in India.

Deodhar Trophy

Ashish Reddy got selected for South Zone squad for 2014-15 Deodhar Trophy, a List A cricket competition in India.

Irani Cup

Pragyan Ojha got selected for Rest of India squad for 2014-15 Irani Cup, a first-class cricket competition in India.

Indian Premier League

Local franchise, Sunrisers Hyderabad retained Ashish Reddy and Chama Milind and picked Hanuma Vihari while Mumbai Indians picked Pragyan Ojha in the IPL Auction for 2015 Indian Premier League season.

=== Vijay Hazare Trophy ===
Hyderabad began their campaign in Vijay Hazare Trophy, a List A cricket tournament in India, against Tamil Nadu at Hyderabad on 7 November 2014. They finished in sixth in South Zone with a win and four losses.

==== Points Table ====
South Zone

Team	Pld	W	L	T	NR	Pts	NRR
Karnataka	5	4	0	0	1	18	+2.012
Goa	5	3	2	0	0	12	+0.083
Andhra	5	2	2	0	1	10	-0.607
Tamil Nadu	5	2	2	0	1	10	-0.758
Kerala	5	1	3	0	1	6	+0.425
Hyderabad	5	1	4	0	0	4	-0.958

- Top two teams advanced to knockout stage.

==== Matches ====
Zonal Stage

7 November 2014	Tamil Nadu; 334/6 (50 overs)	v	Hyderabad; 287 (47.2 overs)	Tamil Nadu won by 47 runs
Scorecard	Tamil Nadu; 334/6 (50 overs)	v	Hyderabad; 287 (47.2 overs)	Gymkhana Ground, Hyderabad; Umpires: Nitin Pandit and Nandan Phadnis
Scorecard	Abhinav Mukund 139 (142); Chama Milind 3/71 (10 overs)		Tirumalasetti Suman 136 (119); Lakshmipathy Balaji 3/55 (9.2 overs)	Gymkhana Ground, Hyderabad; Umpires: Nitin Pandit and Nandan Phadnis
Hyderabad won the toss and elected to field.				Gymkhana Ground, Hyderabad; Umpires: Nitin Pandit and Nandan Phadnis

8 November 2014	Hyderabad; 193 (50 overs)	v	Andhra; 194/3 (44.1 overs)	Andhra won by 7 wickets
Scorecard	Hyderabad; 193 (50 overs)	v	Andhra; 194/3 (44.1 overs)	Gymkhana Ground, Hyderabad; Umpires: Abhijit Deshmukh and Nandan Phadnis
Scorecard	Ashish Reddy 43 (53); CV Stephen 3/26 (10 overs)		Mohammad Kaif 88* (107); Chama Milind 2/40 (9.1 overs)	Gymkhana Ground, Hyderabad; Umpires: Abhijit Deshmukh and Nandan Phadnis
Andhra won the toss and elected to field.; Danny Dereck Prince (Hyderabad) made his List A debut.				Gymkhana Ground, Hyderabad; Umpires: Abhijit Deshmukh and Nandan Phadnis

10 November 2014	Kerala; 321/9 (50 overs)	v	Hyderabad; 188 (43.5 overs)	Kerala won by 133 runs
Scorecard	Kerala; 321/9 (50 overs)	v	Hyderabad; 188 (43.5 overs)	Nuclear Fuel Complex Ground, Hyderabad; Umpires: Ravi Shankar and Nandan Phadnis
Scorecard	K. B. Pawan 106 (106); Ashish Reddy 5/30 (9 overs)		Ashish Reddy 119* (107); Basil Thampi 2/29 (9 overs)	Nuclear Fuel Complex Ground, Hyderabad; Umpires: Ravi Shankar and Nandan Phadnis
Kerala won the toss and elected to bat.; Mehdi Hasan (Hyderabad) and Vishnu Vinod (Kerala) both made their List A debuts.				Nuclear Fuel Complex Ground, Hyderabad; Umpires: Ravi Shankar and Nandan Phadnis

11 November 2014	Hyderabad; 295/7 (50 overs)	v	Karnataka; 300/5 (48 overs)	Karnataka won by 5 wickets
Scorecard	Hyderabad; 295/7 (50 overs)	v	Karnataka; 300/5 (48 overs)	Nuclear Fuel Complex Ground, Hyderabad; Umpires: Ravi Shankar and Ajit Datar
Scorecard	Tanmay Agarwal 136 (123); Sreenath Aravind 4/41 (10 overs)		Shishir Bhavane 81* (76); Ashish Reddy 2/54 (10 overs)	Nuclear Fuel Complex Ground, Hyderabad; Umpires: Ravi Shankar and Ajit Datar
Hyderabad won the toss and elected to bat.; Tanmay Agarwal (Hyderabad) made his List A debut.				Nuclear Fuel Complex Ground, Hyderabad; Umpires: Ravi Shankar and Ajit Datar

13 November 2014	Goa; 170 (33.3 overs)	v	Hyderabad; 171/3 (32.4 overs)	Hyderabad won by 7 wickets
Scorecard	Goa; 170 (33.3 overs)	v	Hyderabad; 171/3 (32.4 overs)	Rajiv Gandhi International Stadium, Hyderabad; Umpires: Ravi Shankar and Abhijit Deshmukh
Scorecard	Sagun Kamat 30 (28); Chama Milind 4/21 (6.3 overs)		Hanuma Vihari 67 (84); Robin D'Souza 2/17 (6 overs)	Rajiv Gandhi International Stadium, Hyderabad; Umpires: Ravi Shankar and Abhijit Deshmukh
Hyderabad won the toss and elected to field.; Rajashekhar Harikant (Goa) made his List A debut.				Rajiv Gandhi International Stadium, Hyderabad; Umpires: Ravi Shankar and Abhijit Deshmukh

==== Statistics ====
Most runs

Player	Mat	Inns	Runs	Ave	SR	HS	100	50
Ashish Reddy	5	5	219	73.00	109.50	119*	1	1
Hanuma Vihari	5	5	168	33.60	76.71	82	0	2
Tirumalasetti Suman	4	4	159	39.75	100.63	136	1	0

- Source: ESPNcricinfo

Most wickets

Player	Mat	Inns	Wkts	Ave	Econ	BBI	SR	4WI	5WI
Ashish Reddy	5	5	11	20.09	5.26	5/30	22.9	0	1
Chama Milind	5	5	11	20.90	5.52	4/21	22.7	1	0
Ravi Kiran	5	5	3	84.33	5.88	2/42	86.0	0	0

- Source: ESPNcricinfo

=== Ranji Trophy ===
Hyderabad began their campaign in Ranji Trophy, the premier first-class cricket tournament in India, against Andhra at Visakhapatnam on 7 December 2014. They finished fifth in Group C with a win, six draws and a loss.

==== Points Table ====
Group C

Team	Pld	W	L	D	A	Pts	Q
Assam	8	5	1	2	0	38	1.325
Andhra	8	4	1	3	0	29	1.454
Himachal Pradesh	8	2	0	6	0	28	1.677
Jharkhand	8	2	1	5	0	21	1.171
Hyderabad	8	1	1	6	0	20	1.123
Kerala	8	1	1	6	0	20	0.908
Tripura	8	0	3	5	0	9	0.635
Services	8	0	4	4	0	8	0.779
Goa	8	0	3	5	0	5	0.664

- Top two teams advanced to knockout stage and promoted to Group A / B for 2015–16 Ranji Trophy.

==== Matches ====
Group Stage

7–10 December 2014	Hyderabad	v	Andhra	Match Drawn Hyderabad took first innings lead
Scorecard	522 (148.4 overs); Chama Milind 97* (113); Siva Kumar 4/84 (27.4 overs)		369 (107.4 overs); Prasanth Kumar 124 (257); Syed Quadri 3/54 (13.2 overs)	Dr. Y. S. Rajasekhara Reddy ACA–VDCA Cricket Stadium, Visakhapatnam; Umpires: Amiesh Saheba and Virender Sharma; Player of the match: Chama Milind (Hyderabad)
Scorecard			215/2 (82 overs) (f/o); K. S. Bharat 130* (260); Chama Milind 1/25 (13 overs)	Dr. Y. S. Rajasekhara Reddy ACA–VDCA Cricket Stadium, Visakhapatnam; Umpires: Amiesh Saheba and Virender Sharma; Player of the match: Chama Milind (Hyderabad)
Andhra won the toss and elected to field.; Balchander Anirudh (Hyderabad) made his first-class debut.

14–17 December 2014	Hyderabad	v	Goa	Match Drawn Hyderabad took first innings lead
Scorecard	568/7d (180 overs); Hanuma Vihari 179 (260); Saurabh Bandekar 3/115 (28 overs)		269 (101.1 overs); Sagun Kamat 97 (215); Chama Milind 3/63 (18 overs)	Rajiv Gandhi International Cricket Stadium, Hyderabad; Umpires: Nitin Pandit and Nikhil Patwardhan; Player of the match: Hanuma Vihari (Hyderabad)
Scorecard			181/2 (68 overs) (f/o); Amogh Sunil Desai 100* (192); Pragyan Ojha 1/34 (14 overs)	Rajiv Gandhi International Cricket Stadium, Hyderabad; Umpires: Nitin Pandit and Nikhil Patwardhan; Player of the match: Hanuma Vihari (Hyderabad)
Goa won the toss and elected to field.; Tanmay Agarwal (Hyderabad) made his first-class debut.

21–24 December 2014	Hyderabad	v	Kerala	Match Drawn Kerala took first innings lead
Scorecard	270 (105.4 overs); Hanuma Vihari 76 (160); Perumparambath Anthaf 5/61 (25.4 overs)		447/7d (158 overs); Sachin Baby 200* (361); Ashish Reddy 3/76 (29 overs)	Krishnagiri Stadium, Wayanad; Umpires: Tapan Sharma and Sanjeev Dua; Player of the match: Sachin Baby (Kerala)
Scorecard	249/1 (77 overs); Tanmay Agarwal 110 (229); Sachin Baby 1/28 (16 overs)			Krishnagiri Stadium, Wayanad; Umpires: Tapan Sharma and Sanjeev Dua; Player of the match: Sachin Baby (Kerala)
Kerala won the toss and elected to field.; Karaparambil Monish (Kerala) made his first-class debut.

28–31 December 2014	Services	v	Hyderabad	Match Drawn Hyderabad took first innings lead
Scorecard	306 (101.1 overs); Deepak Punia 70 (115); Akash Bhandari 4/75 (24 overs)		338 (132 overs); Hanuma Vihari 119 (242); Saurabh Kumar 4/92 (42 overs)	Rajiv Gandhi International Cricket Stadium, Hyderabad; Umpires: Umesh Dubey and Sudhir Asnani; Player of the match: Akash Bhandari (Hyderabad)
Scorecard	285 (94.3 overs); Yashpal Singh 60 (117); Akash Bhandari 5/109 (40 overs)		52/1 (14 overs); Tanmay Agarwal 27* (42); Yashpal Singh 1/2 (1 over)	Rajiv Gandhi International Cricket Stadium, Hyderabad; Umpires: Umesh Dubey and Sudhir Asnani; Player of the match: Akash Bhandari (Hyderabad)
Services won the toss and elected to bat.

5–8 January 2015	Tripura	v	Hyderabad	Hyderabad won by 9 wickets
Scorecard	184 (45.1 overs); Kaushal Acharjee 55 (81); Anwar Ahmed 5/53 (15.1 overs)		491/9d (127.4 overs); Akshath Reddy 174 (265); Tushar Saha 3/106 (29 overs)	Maharaja Bir Bikram College Stadium, Agartala; Umpires: Sanjay Hazare and Navdeep Singh; Player of the match: Akshath Reddy (Hyderabad)
Scorecard	351 (119.1 overs); Rakesh Solanki 85 (127); Chama Milind 4/83 (23 overs)		48/1 (6.5 overs); Akshath Reddy 27 (17); Rana Dutta 1/12 (3 overs)	Maharaja Bir Bikram College Stadium, Agartala; Umpires: Sanjay Hazare and Navdeep Singh; Player of the match: Akshath Reddy (Hyderabad)
Hyderabad won the toss and elected to field.

13–16 January 2015	Assam	v	Hyderabad	Assam won by an innings and 56 runs
Scorecard	393 (162.3 overs); Dheeraj Jadhav 74 (259); Akash Bhandari 3/93 (39.3 overs)		215 (100.1 overs); Tanmay Agarwal 68 (205); Swarupam Purkayastha 5/59 (28 overs)	Rajiv Gandhi International Cricket Stadium, Hyderabad; Umpires: Nikhil Patwardhan and Umesh Dubey; Player of the match: Swarupam Purkayastha (Assam)
Scorecard			122 (66.3 overs) (f/o); Hanuma Vihari 24 (102); Swarupam Purkayastha 8/29 (29 overs)	Rajiv Gandhi International Cricket Stadium, Hyderabad; Umpires: Nikhil Patwardhan and Umesh Dubey; Player of the match: Swarupam Purkayastha (Assam)
Assam won the toss and elected to bat.; A I Harrsha (Hyderabad) made his first-class debut.

21–24 January 2015	Jharkhand	v	Hyderabad	Match Drawn Jharkhand took first innings lead
Scorecard	556/9d (163.2 overs); Ishank Jaggi 201* (342); Akash Bhandari 4/136 (40.2 overs)		455 (124 overs); Akshath Reddy 133 (232); Varun Aaron 5/131 (30 overs)	JSCA International Stadium Complex, Ranchi; Umpires: Sanjay Hazare and Ulhas Gandhe; Player of the match: Ishank Jaggi (Jharkhand)
Scorecard	189/4d (43.4 overs); Ishan Kishan 84 (128); Akash Bhandari 2/46 (12 overs)		7/0 (8 overs); Chama Milind 7* (20)	JSCA International Stadium Complex, Ranchi; Umpires: Sanjay Hazare and Ulhas Gandhe; Player of the match: Ishank Jaggi (Jharkhand)
Jharkhand won the toss and elected to bat.

6–9 February 2015	Himachal Pradesh	v	Hyderabad	Match Drawn Hyderabad took first innings lead
Scorecard	511 (152.5 overs); Bipul Sharma 176 (292); Bavanaka Sandeep 4/57 (16.5 overs)		524/5 (181 overs); Hanuma Vihari 263 (419); Vikramjeet Malik 2/58 (32 overs)	Gymkhana Ground, Hyderabad; Umpires: Sudhir Asnani and Rajesh Deshpande; Player of the match: Hanuma Vihari (Hyderabad)
Hyderabad won the toss and elected to field.; Jaggulal Anshul (Himachal Pradesh) and Himalay Agarwal (Hyderabad) made their first-class debuts.

==== Statistics ====
Most runs

Player	Mat	Inns	Runs	Ave	SR	HS	100	50
Hanuma Vihari	8	11	780	86.66	54.20	263	3	2
Akshath Reddy	8	12	624	56.72	53.10	174	3	1
Tanmay Agarwal	7	12	558	62.00	38.69	135	3	1

- Source: ESPNcricinfo

Most wickets

Player	Mat	Inns	Wkts	Ave	Econ	BBI	SR	5WI	10WM
Akash Bhandari	4	7	20	25.85	2.90	5/109	53.4	1	0
Chama Milind	7	11	16	42.06	3.18	4/83	79.1	0	0
Ashish Reddy	8	13	14	36.00	2.89	3/45	74.6	0	0

- Source: ESPNcricinfo

=== Syed Mushtaq Ali Trophy ===
Hyderabad began their campaign in Syed Mushtaq Ali Trophy, a Twenty20 tournament in India, against Tamil Nadu at Kochi on 25 March 2015. Ashish Reddy took the hat-trick in their final zonal match against Goa. They finished inside top-2 in South Zone with three wins and two losses to advance to Super League. They finish fifth in Super League with a win and three losses.

==== Points Table ====
South Zone

Team	Pld	W	L	T	NR	Pts	NRR
Andhra	5	4	1	0	0	16	+0.212
Hyderabad	5	3	2	0	0	12	+0.943
Karnataka	5	3	2	0	0	12	+0.655
Tamil Nadu	5	3	2	0	0	12	–0.416
Kerala	5	2	3	0	0	8	+0.374
Goa	5	0	5	0	0	0	–1.928

- Top two teams advanced to the Super League.

Super League Group B

Team	Pld	W	L	T	NR	Pts	NRR
Punjab	4	3	1	0	0	12	+0.345
Mumbai	4	2	2	0	0	8	+0.571
Rajasthan	4	2	2	0	0	8	+0.450
Odisha	4	2	2	0	0	8	+0.334
Hyderabad	4	1	3	0	0	4	–1.465

- Top team advanced to the final.

==== Matches ====
Zonal Stage

25 March 2015	Tamil Nadu; 186/5 (20 overs)	v	Hyderabad; 150/9 (20 overs)	Tamil Nadu won by 36 runs
Scorecard	Tamil Nadu; 186/5 (20 overs)	v	Hyderabad; 150/9 (20 overs)	St. Paul's College Ground, Kochi; Umpires: Anand Ovalekar and Amit Bansal
Scorecard	Anirudha Srikkanth 62 (43); Chama Milind 2/33 (4 overs)		Tirumalasetti Suman 82 (56); Aswin Crist 4/26 (4 overs)	St. Paul's College Ground, Kochi; Umpires: Anand Ovalekar and Amit Bansal
Hyderabad won the toss and elected to field.; Tanmay Agarwal (Hyderabad); Antony Dhas, and Aswin Crist (Tamil Nadu) all made their T20 debuts.				St. Paul's College Ground, Kochi; Umpires: Anand Ovalekar and Amit Bansal

26 March 2015	Hyderabad; 178/8 (20 overs)	v	Andhra; 96/9 (20 overs)	Hyderabad won by 82 runs
Scorecard	Hyderabad; 178/8 (20 overs)	v	Andhra; 96/9 (20 overs)	St. Paul's College Ground, Kochi; Umpires: Ulhas Gandhe and Amit Bansal
Scorecard	Tirumalasetti Suman 93 (61); Bandaru Ayyappa 3/25 (4 overs)		K. S. Bharat 23 (23); Pragyan Ojha 4/15 (4 overs)	St. Paul's College Ground, Kochi; Umpires: Ulhas Gandhe and Amit Bansal
Andhra won the toss and elected to field.				St. Paul's College Ground, Kochi; Umpires: Ulhas Gandhe and Amit Bansal

27 March 2015	Kerala; 125/7 (20 overs)	v	Hyderabad; 98 (18.3 overs)	Kerala won by 27 runs
Scorecard	Kerala; 125/7 (20 overs)	v	Hyderabad; 98 (18.3 overs)	Jawaharlal Nehru Stadium, Kochi; Umpires: Amit Bansal and Anand Ovalekar
Scorecard	Rohan Prem 49* (48); Chama Milind 3/28 (4 overs)		Danny Dereck Prince 33 (44); Amit Verma 4/14 (3 overs)	Jawaharlal Nehru Stadium, Kochi; Umpires: Amit Bansal and Anand Ovalekar
Kerala won the toss and elected to bat.; Fabid Ahmed (Kerala) made his T20 debut.				Jawaharlal Nehru Stadium, Kochi; Umpires: Amit Bansal and Anand Ovalekar

28 March 2015	Hyderabad; 162/5 (20 overs)	v	Karnataka; 131/8 (20 overs)	Hyderabad won by 31 runs
Scorecard	Hyderabad; 162/5 (20 overs)	v	Karnataka; 131/8 (20 overs)	Jawaharlal Nehru Stadium, Kochi; Umpires: Ulhas Gandhe and Anand Ovalekar
Scorecard	Tirumalasetti Suman 100 (60); Gneshwar Naveen 1/10 (1 over)		Shreyas Gopal 39 (22); Ashish Reddy 4/22 (4 overs)	Jawaharlal Nehru Stadium, Kochi; Umpires: Ulhas Gandhe and Anand Ovalekar
Karnataka won the toss and elected to field.				Jawaharlal Nehru Stadium, Kochi; Umpires: Ulhas Gandhe and Anand Ovalekar

29 March 2015	Goa; 118/9 (20 overs)	v	Hyderabad; 121/2 (14.3 overs)	Hyderabad won by 8 wickets
Scorecard	Goa; 118/9 (20 overs)	v	Hyderabad; 121/2 (14.3 overs)	Jawaharlal Nehru Stadium, Kochi; Umpires: Anand Ovalekar and Rajesh Deshpande
Scorecard	Darshan Misal 67 (59); Ashish Reddy 3/13 (4 overs)		Akshath Reddy 39* (26); Darshan Misal 2/27 (4 overs)	Jawaharlal Nehru Stadium, Kochi; Umpires: Anand Ovalekar and Rajesh Deshpande
Hyderabad won the toss and elected to field.; Ashish Reddy (Hyderabad) took the hat-trickin the first over.				Jawaharlal Nehru Stadium, Kochi; Umpires: Anand Ovalekar and Rajesh Deshpande

Super League Group Stage

1 April 2015	Hyderabad; 146/5 (20 overs)	v	Punjab; 149/9 (19.3 overs)	Punjab won by 1 wicket
Scorecard	Hyderabad; 146/5 (20 overs)	v	Punjab; 149/9 (19.3 overs)	DRIEMS Ground, Cuttack; Umpires: Milind Pathak and Ajit Datar
Scorecard	Akshath Reddy 32* (25); Siddarth Kaul 2/19 (4 overs)		Mandeep Singh 63 (43); Chama Milind 4/24 (3.3 overs)	DRIEMS Ground, Cuttack; Umpires: Milind Pathak and Ajit Datar
Punjab won the toss and elected to field.				DRIEMS Ground, Cuttack; Umpires: Milind Pathak and Ajit Datar

3 April 2015	Rajasthan; 183/7 (20 overs)	v	Hyderabad; 97 (18.3 overs)	Rajasthan won by 86 runs
Scorecard	Rajasthan; 183/7 (20 overs)	v	Hyderabad; 97 (18.3 overs)	DRIEMS Ground, Cuttack; Umpires: Ajit Datar and Milind Pathak
Scorecard	Suryaprakash Suwalka 50 (32); Pagadala Naidu 2/27 (3 overs)		Hanuma Vihari 46 (28); Aniket Choudhary 3/10 (3 overs)	DRIEMS Ground, Cuttack; Umpires: Ajit Datar and Milind Pathak
Hyderabad won the toss and elected to field.				DRIEMS Ground, Cuttack; Umpires: Ajit Datar and Milind Pathak

4 April 2015	Odisha; 153 (19.1 overs)	v	Hyderabad; 154/5 (20 overs)	Hyderabad won by 5 wickets
Scorecard	Odisha; 153 (19.1 overs)	v	Hyderabad; 154/5 (20 overs)	DRIEMS Ground, Cuttack; Umpires: Ajit Datar and Milind Pathak
Scorecard	Biplab Samantray 33 (19); Hanuma Vihari 3/21 (4 overs)		Tanmay Agarwal 49 (33); Alok Mangaraj 1/21 (4 overs)	DRIEMS Ground, Cuttack; Umpires: Ajit Datar and Milind Pathak
Odisha won the toss and elected to bat.				DRIEMS Ground, Cuttack; Umpires: Ajit Datar and Milind Pathak

5 April 2015	Mumbai; 186/4 (20 overs)	v	Hyderabad; 161/9 (20 overs)	Mumbai won by 25 runs
Scorecard	Mumbai; 186/4 (20 overs)	v	Hyderabad; 161/9 (20 overs)	DRIEMS Ground, Cuttack; Umpires: Ulhas Gandhe and Jayaraman Madanagopal
Scorecard	Shashank Singh 61 (23); Ravi Kiran 1/21 (3 overs)		Hanuma Vihari 81 (50); Prathamesh Dake 3/16 (4 overs)	DRIEMS Ground, Cuttack; Umpires: Ulhas Gandhe and Jayaraman Madanagopal
Mumbai won the toss and elected to bat.; Eknath Kerkar and Nikhil Patil (Mumbai) made their T20 debuts.				DRIEMS Ground, Cuttack; Umpires: Ulhas Gandhe and Jayaraman Madanagopal

==== Statistics ====
Most runs

Player	Mat	Inns	Runs	Ave	SR	HS	100	50
Tirumalasetti Suman	9	9	361	40.11	143.25	100	1	2
Hanuma Vihari	9	9	210	26.25	128.83	81	0	1
Tanmay Agarwal	9	9	194	21.55	114.79	49	0	0

- Source: ESPNcricinfo

Most wickets

Player	Mat	Inns	Wkts	Ave	Econ	BBI	SR	4WI	5WI
Chama Milind	9	9	17	14.58	7.83	4/24	11.1	1	0
Ravi Kiran	9	9	14	16.78	6.91	3/31	14.5	0	0
Ashish Reddy	7	7	10	15.30	5.88	4/22	15.6	1	0

- Source: ESPNcricinfo

== Senior Women's team ==
=== Squads ===
- Head coach: Abdul Bari Wahab
- Physio : Harini Balachander

One-Day League	T20 League
M Shalini (c); Ananya Upendran; M Soujanya Nath; M Keerthana; G Sindhuja Reddy (wk); Nishath Fatima (wk); Arundhati Reddy; Sneha Morey; G Praneesha; M Revathi; Vellore Mahesh Kavya; D Ramya; Laxmi Prasanna; V Mounica; J Rameshwari	M Shalini (c); Ananya Upendran; Sneha Morey; M Keerthana; M Soujanya Nath; Arundhati Reddy; Rachana S Kumar; Vellore Mahesh Kavya; Nishath Fatima (wk); G Sindhuja Reddy (wk); D Ramya; Soumya Somanchi; Pranathi Reddy; G Praneesha; Ekta Saxena

Senior women's cricket inter zonal two day game

Sneha Morey, Ananya Upendran, Vellore Mahesh Kavya and M Shalini got selected for South Zone squad for 2015-16 Senior women's cricket inter zonal three day game, a maiden Women's First-class cricket tournament in India.

=== One-Day League ===
Hyderabad began their campaign in Senior women's one day league, Women's List A cricket tournament in India, against Bengal at Rajkot on 6 December 2014. They finished fifth in Elite Group A with a win and three losses.

==== Points Table ====
Elite Group A

Team	Pld	W	L	T	NR	Pts	NRR
Railways	4	3	1	0	0	12	+0.750
Delhi	4	3	1	0	0	12	+0.588
Bengal	4	2	2	0	0	8	+0.439
Uttar Pradesh	4	1	3	0	0	4	-1.339
Hyderabad	4	1	3	0	0	4	-0.521

Top two teams advanced to Super League.

==== Matches ====
Group Stage

6 December 2014	Bengal; 148 (48.1 overs)	v	Hyderabad; 151/3 (45.4 overs)	Hyderabad won by 7 wickets
Scorecard	Bengal; 148 (48.1 overs)	v	Hyderabad; 151/3 (45.4 overs)	Saurashtra University Cricket Ground, Rajkot; Umpires: Charhate Ganesh Parshuram and Lund Vikas
Scorecard	Paramita Roy 66 (127); M Soujanya Nath 2/27 (6 overs)		Sneha Morey 49 (85); Jhulan Goswami 2/21 (10 overs)	Saurashtra University Cricket Ground, Rajkot; Umpires: Charhate Ganesh Parshuram and Lund Vikas
Bengal won the toss and elected to bat.				Saurashtra University Cricket Ground, Rajkot; Umpires: Charhate Ganesh Parshuram and Lund Vikas

10 December 2014	Hyderabad; 86 (34.4 overs)	v	Delhi; 87/0 (21.1 overs)	Delhi won by 10 wickets
Scorecard	Hyderabad; 86 (34.4 overs)	v	Delhi; 87/0 (21.1 overs)	Railway Cricket Ground, Rajkot; Umpires: Couto Marcus Dominic and Lund Vikas
Scorecard	Sneha Morey 34 (48); Reema Malhotra 2/6 (1.4 overs)		Priya Punia 45* (63)	Railway Cricket Ground, Rajkot; Umpires: Couto Marcus Dominic and Lund Vikas
Hyderabad won the toss and elected to bat.				Railway Cricket Ground, Rajkot; Umpires: Couto Marcus Dominic and Lund Vikas

12 December 2014	Uttar Pradesh; 138 (48.5 overs)	v	Hyderabad; 135/9 (50 overs)	Uttar Pradesh won by 3 runs
Scorecard	Uttar Pradesh; 138 (48.5 overs)	v	Hyderabad; 135/9 (50 overs)	Saurashtra University Cricket Ground, Rajkot; Umpires: Couto Marcus Dominic and Timaney Rajesh Singh
Scorecard	Nishu Choudhary 51 (72); Vellore Mahesh Kavya 2/19 (9 overs)		M Soujanya Nath 27 (37); Nishu Choudhary 2/13 (5 overs)	Saurashtra University Cricket Ground, Rajkot; Umpires: Couto Marcus Dominic and Timaney Rajesh Singh
Uttar Pradesh won the toss and elected to bat.				Saurashtra University Cricket Ground, Rajkot; Umpires: Couto Marcus Dominic and Timaney Rajesh Singh

14 December 2014	Railways; 224/4 (50 overs)	v	Hyderabad; 81/8 (50 overs)	Railways won by 143 runs
Scorecard	Railways; 224/4 (50 overs)	v	Hyderabad; 81/8 (50 overs)	Railways Cricket Ground, Rajkot; Umpires: Couto Marcus Dominic and Charhate Ganesh Parshuram
Scorecard	Shweta Jadhav 99 (132); Ananya Upendran 1/30 (9 overs)		M Soujanya Nath 36* (113); Ekta Bisht 2/14 (10 overs)	Railways Cricket Ground, Rajkot; Umpires: Couto Marcus Dominic and Charhate Ganesh Parshuram
Hyderabad won the toss and elected to field.				Railways Cricket Ground, Rajkot; Umpires: Couto Marcus Dominic and Charhate Ganesh Parshuram

==== Statistics ====
Most runs

Player	Mat	Inns	Runs	Ave	SR	HS	100	50
Sneha Morey	4	4	110	27.50	57.89	49	0	0
M Soujanya Nath	4	3	68	34.00	38.20	36*	0	0
M Shalini	4	4	56	18.67	46.28	34	0	0

- Source: BCCI

Most wickets

Player	Mat	Inns	Wkts	Ave	Econ	BBI	SR	4WI	5WI
Vellore Mahesh Kavya	4	4	4	37.50	4.15	2/19	54.25	0	0
Ananya Upendran	4	4	3	26.67	2.58	1/17	62.00	0	0
Arundhati Reddy	4	4	3	36.67	3.43	2/41	64.00	0	0

- Source: BCCI

=== T20 League ===
Hyderabad began their campaign in Senior Women's T20 League, a Women's Twenty20 cricket tournament in India, against Kerala at Mumbai on 11 January 2015. They finished in fourth in Elite Group B with a win and three losses.

==== Points Table ====
Elite Group B

Team	Pld	W	L	T	NR	Pts	NRR
Punjab	4	4	0	0	0	16	+0.844
Madhya Pradesh	4	3	1	0	0	12	+0.363
Kerala	4	1	3	0	0	4	-0.198
Hyderabad	4	1	3	0	0	4	-0.433
Mumbai	4	1	3	0	0	4	-0.541

Top two teams advanced to Super League.
Bottom team relegated to 2015-16 Plate Group.

==== Matches ====
Group Stage

11 January 2015	Kerala; 89/4 (20 overs)	v	Hyderabad; 90/6 (17.4 overs)	Hyderabad won by 6 wickets
Scorecard	Kerala; 89/4 (20 overs)	v	Hyderabad; 90/6 (17.4 overs)	Wankhede Stadium, Mumbai; Umpires: Godara Rajeev Kumar and Lund Vikas
Scorecard	Jincy George 23* (41); Vellore Mahesh Kavya 2/15 (4 overs)		M Shalini 30 (26); S Sanjana 2/14 (4 overs)	Wankhede Stadium, Mumbai; Umpires: Godara Rajeev Kumar and Lund Vikas
Kerala won the toss and elected to bat.				Wankhede Stadium, Mumbai; Umpires: Godara Rajeev Kumar and Lund Vikas

12 January 2015	Hyderabad; 86 (20 overs)	v	Punjab; 87/2 (14 overs)	Punjab won by 8 wickets
Scorecard	Hyderabad; 86 (20 overs)	v	Punjab; 87/2 (14 overs)	Bandra Kurla Complex Ground, Mumbai; Umpires: Godara Rajeev Kumar and Dhote Saurabh Suresh
Scorecard	Sneha Morey 31 (40); Sneh Rana 3/12 (4 overs)		Jasia Akhtar 41 (24); M Shalini 1/23 (4 overs)	Bandra Kurla Complex Ground, Mumbai; Umpires: Godara Rajeev Kumar and Dhote Saurabh Suresh
Hyderabad won the toss and elected to bat.				Bandra Kurla Complex Ground, Mumbai; Umpires: Godara Rajeev Kumar and Dhote Saurabh Suresh

12 January 2015	Madhya Pradesh; 113/7 (20 overs)	v	Hyderabad; 100/7 (20 overs)	Madhya Pradesh won by 13 runs
Scorecard	Madhya Pradesh; 113/7 (20 overs)	v	Hyderabad; 100/7 (20 overs)	Wankhede Stadium, Mumbai; Umpires: Dhote Saurabh Suresh and Lund Vikas
Scorecard	Nidhi Buley 26* (21); Vellore Mahesh Kavya 4/20 (4 overs)		Sneha Morey 29 (41); Ruchita Buley 2/17 (4 overs)	Wankhede Stadium, Mumbai; Umpires: Dhote Saurabh Suresh and Lund Vikas
Madhya Pradesh won the toss and elected to bat.				Wankhede Stadium, Mumbai; Umpires: Dhote Saurabh Suresh and Lund Vikas

13 January 2015	Mumbai; 107/5 (20 overs)	v	Hyderabad; 106/5 (20 overs)	Mumbai won by 1 run
Scorecard	Mumbai; 107/5 (20 overs)	v	Hyderabad; 106/5 (20 overs)	Bandra Kurla Complex Ground, Mumbai; Umpires: Vasuki K R and Dhote Saurabh Suresh
Scorecard	Sarika Koli 40* (31); Vellore Mahesh Kavya 2/29 (4 overs)		M Shalini 35 (36); M M Gavande 2/22 (4 overs)	Bandra Kurla Complex Ground, Mumbai; Umpires: Vasuki K R and Dhote Saurabh Suresh
Mumbai won the toss and elected to bat.				Bandra Kurla Complex Ground, Mumbai; Umpires: Vasuki K R and Dhote Saurabh Suresh

==== Statistics ====
Most runs

Player	Mat	Inns	Runs	Ave	SR	HS	100	50
M Shalini	4	4	83	20.75	88.29	35	0	0
Sneha Morey	4	4	70	17.50	63.06	31	0	0
Ananya Upendran	4	4	57	14.25	91.93	26	0	0

- Source: BCCI

Most wickets

Player	Mat	Inns	Wkts	Ave	Econ	BBI	SR	4WI	5WI
Vellore Mahesh Kavya	4	4	8	9.75	5.20	4/20	11.25	1	0
Soumya Somanchi	4	4	3	27.00	5.40	2/25	30.00	0	0
Arundhati Reddy	3	3	2	20.50	3.72	1/11	33.00	0	0

- Source: BCCI

== See also ==
- Hyderabad cricket team
- Hyderabad women's cricket team
- Hyderabad Cricket Association
