= 2015–16 Vijay Hazare Trophy Group C =

- Dates: 10 December 2015 – 18 December 2015
- Administrator: BCCI
- Cricket format: List A cricket
- Tournament format: Round robin
- Host: Delhi
- Participants: 7
- Matches: 21

2015–16 Vijay Hazare Trophy is the 14th season of the Vijay Hazare Trophy, a List A cricket tournament in India. It is contested by 27 domestic cricket teams of India divided into 4 Groups. The winner will advance to play 2015–16 Deodhar Trophy.

The top two teams advanced to the quarter finals.

== Fixtures ==
=== Round one ===
CV Stephen and left-arm spinner B Sudhakar bowled Andhra to a 58-run thumping win against Tripura in Delhi.

10 December 2015
Scorecard

Andhra; 273 (49.3 overs)	v	Tripura; 215 (45.1 overs)
A. G. Pradeep 71 (70); Manisankar Murasingh 2/45 (10 overs); Sanjay Majumder 2/45 (10 overs)		Nirupam Sen Chowdhary 52 (76); Bodavarapu Sudhakar 3/28 (8.1 overs)

Andhra won by 58 runs
Palam B Ground, Delhi
Umpires: Rohan Pandit and Tapan Sharma

- Tripura won the toss and elected to field.
- Ashwin Hebbar, K. V. Sasikanth, Koripalli Sreekanth (Andhra); Chiranjit Paul (Tripura) all made their List A debuts.

Delhi pacer, Subodh Bhati claimed four for 17 on debut to help his team to a comprehensive 31-run win against a strong Baroda team comprising Ambati Rayudu, Yusuf Pathan and Irfan Pathan. After Nitish Rana's 62 followed by Pawan Negi's, 57-ball 47* helped Delhi cross to 208 at the Feroz Shah Kotla, the pace trio of Bhati, Pradeep Sangwan and N A Saini helped warp-up Baroda for 177 and take the team to victory.

Deepak Hooda made a half-century for Baroda as he valiantly looked to hold the innings together.

10 December 2015
Scorecard

Delhi; 208/7 (50 overs)	v	Baroda; 177 (46.5 overs)
Nitish Rana 62 (86); Rishi Arothe 2/30 (9 overs)		Deepak Hooda 50 (76); Suboth Bhati 4/17 (6.5 overs)

Delhi won by 31 runs
Feroz Shah Kotla, Delhi
Umpires: Krishnamachari Bharatan and Nand Kishore

- Baroda won the toss and elected to field.
- Rishi Arothe (Baroda); Suboth Bhati and Navdeep Saini (Delhi) made their List A debuts.

Defending 226, Alok Sahoo bowled Odisha to a thrilling three-run win against Vidarbha. The pacer claimed a five-for to help his team to victory, while Basant Mohanty bowled S Badrinath and trapped top-order batsman Ganesh Satish to keep Vidarbha in check. R Jangid's 105-ball 97 and A Karnewar's 72 had kept Vidarbha in the fray but B Samnataray accounted for the former while Sahoo sent back the latter and ran through the lower-order to post a win.

10 December 2015
Scorecard

Odisha; 226/9 (50 overs)	v	Vidarbha; 223 (47.2 overs)
Arabind Singh 62 (64); Ravikumar Thakur 3/44 (10 overs)		Ravi Jangid 97 (105); Alok Chandra Sahoo 97 (105)

Odisha won by 3 runs
Palam A Ground, Delhi
Umpires: Anil Chaudhary and Krishnamachari Srinivasan

- Odisha won the toss and elected to bat.
- Rajesh Dhuper (Odisha); Rajneesh Gurbani and Akshay Karnewar (Vidarbha) all made their List A debuts.

=== Round two ===
Kedar Devdhar (81) and Aditya Waghmode's (76) 159-run opening stand laid the foundation for a respectable total for Baroda. Deepak Hooda(53) and Yusuf Pathan's quickfire 36-ball 46* took the team to 291.

Defending the target, Bhargav Bhatt bowled the team to victory with a six-wicket haul. The left-arm spinner claimed six for 37, while Yusuf picked one as the spun Andhra out for 202.

11 December 2015
Scorecard

Baroda; 291/6 (50 overs)	v	Andhra; 202 (43.1 overs)
Kedar Devdhar 81 (97); Bodavarapu Sudhakar 2/51 (10 overs)		K. V. Sasikanth 59 (54); Bhargav Bhatt 6/37 (10 overs)

Baroda won by 89 runs
Palam B Ground, Delhi
Umpires: Krishnamachari Bharatan and Tapan Sharma

- Andhra won the toss and elected to field.

While Ishant Sharma claimed five for 21 to bowl Vidarbha out for 163, Faiz Fazal played a crucial 125-ball 83-run knock that set Delhi a 164-run target.

The Vidarbha bowling unit then complemented each other and bowled in tandem to wrap-up Delhi for 145. Umesh Yadav gave the team their first breakthrough with the key wicket of Gautam Gambhir for six. Although Unmukt Chand fought to keep Delhi in the game with a 91-ball 57, the rest of the lineup succumbed to the Vidarbha attack.

Spinners Akshay Wakhare, A Karnewar and R Jangid claimed two wickets each while Yadav too finished with two as they bowled the team to victory.

11 December 2015
Scorecard

Vidarbha; 163 (45.2 overs)	v	Delhi; 145 (45.1 overs)
Faiz Fazal 83 (125); Ishant Sharma 5/21 (8.2 overs)		Unmukt Chand 57 (91); Akshay Wakhare 2/10 (4 overs)

Vidarbha won by 18 runs
Feroz Shah Kotla, Delhi
Umpires: Rohan Pandit and Krishnamachari Srinivasan

- Vidarbha won the toss and elected to bat.

Shrikant Mundhe's all-round performance helped Maharashtra post a win in their opening game of the season in the one-day tournament. The lower middle-order batsman's half-century helped the team to a modest 217 for eight. He then returned to claim four for 35 while off-spinner S Kazi took four wickets for 28 runs to help bowl Odisha out for 177. Odisha's top-scorer, Govind Podder (74) was among the spinner's wickets.

11 December 2015
Scorecard

Maharashtra; 217/8 (50 overs)	v	Odisha; 177 (43.4 overs)
Shrikant Mundhe 50 (55); Basant Mohanty 3/40 (10 overs)		Govinda Poddar 74 (82); Shamshuzama Kazi 4/29 (7.4 overs)

Maharashtra won by 40 runs
Palam A Ground, Model Sports Complex, Delhi
Umpires: Anil Chaudhary and Nand Kishore

- Odisha won the toss and elected to field.
- Swapnil Gugale (Maharashtra) and Shesdeep Patra (Odisha) both made their List A debuts.

=== Round three ===
13 December 2015
Scorecard

Baroda; 173 (46 overs)	v	Vidarbha; 174/3 (42 overs)
Ambati Rayudu 40 (74); Ravikumar Thakur 4/27 (8 overs)		Faiz Fazal 89 (117); Rishi Arothe 1/52 (9 overs)

Vidarbha won by 7 wickets
Palam B Ground, Delhi
Umpires: Anil Chaudhary and Nand Kishore

- Vidarbha won the toss and elected to field.

13 December 2015
Scorecard

Odisha; 225/9 (50 overs)	v	Delhi; 228/5 (46.3 overs)
Natraj Behera 50 (56); Manan Sharma 3/47 (10 overs)		Gautam Gambhir 67 (82); Alok Chandra Sahoo 2/58 (8 overs)

Delhi won by 5 wickets
Feroz Shah Kotla, Delhi
Umpires: Krishnamachari Bharatan and Rohan Pandit

- Delhi won the toss and elected to field.
- Subham Nayak and Ranjit Singh (Odisha) both made their List A debuts.

13 December 2015
Scorecard

Maharashtra; 294 (49.4 overs)	v	Tripura; 183 (49.5 overs)
Kedar Jadhav 131 (90); Rajesh Banik 4/40 (7.4 overs)		Sanjay Majumder 52* (68); Swapnil Gugale 4/21 (6.5 overs)

Maharashtra won by 111 runs
Palam A Ground, Delhi
Umpires: Krishnamachari Srinivasan and Tapan Sharma

- Maharashtra won the toss and elected to bat.
- Nikit Dhumal (Maharashtra) and Joydeep Bhattacharjee (Tripura) both made their List A debuts.

=== Round four ===
14 December 2015
Scorecard

Maharashtra; 241/8 (50 overs)	v	Andhra; 194 (42.5 overs)
Kedar Jadhav 101 (101); Duvvarapu Siva Kumar 3/24 (10 overs)		Koripalli Sreekanth 74 (85); Shamshuzama Kazi 4/36 (8.5 overs)

Maharashtra won by 47 runs
Palam B Ground, Delhi
Umpires: Anil Chaudhary and Tapan Sharma

- Maharashtra won the toss and elected to bat.
- Bharatkumar Solanki (Maharashtra) made his List A debut.

14 December 2015
Scorecard

Baroda; 225 (50 overs)	v	Odisha; 169 (46.2 overs)
Aditya Waghmode 111 (143); Ankit Yadav 4/44 (9 overs)		Natraj Behera 67* (81); Munaf Patel 2/31 (8 overs)

Baroda won by 56 runs
Palam A Ground, Delhi
Umpires: Nand Kishore and Krishnamachari Srinivasan

- Baroda won the toss and elected to bat.

14 December 2015
Scorecard

Tripura; 100 (39.3 overs)	v	Delhi; 101/2 (16 overs)
Parvinder Singh 20 (32); Pawan Suyal 3/14 (10 overs)		Nitish Rana 67* (48); Rana Dutta 2/21 (7 overs)

Delhi won by 8 wickets
Feroz Shah Kotla, Delhi
Umpires: Krishnamachari Bharatan and Rohan Pandit

- Delhi won the toss and elected to field.

=== Round five ===
15 December 2015
Scorecard

Andhra; 261/4 (50 overs)	v	Odisha; 206 (48 overs)
A. G. Pradeep 102* (123); Biplab Samantray 2/43 (10 overs)		Anurag Sarangi 52 (72); Duvvarapu Siva Kumar 4/37 (10 overs)

Andhra won by 55 runs
Palam A Ground, Delhi
Umpires: Krishnamachari Bharatan and Rohan Pandit

- Andhra won the toss and elected to bat.

15 December 2015
Scorecard

Maharashtra; 176/9 (50 overs)	v	Baroda; 177/2 (39.3 overs)
Rahul Tripathi 46 (73); Bhargav Bhatt 4/30 (10 overs)		Aditya Waghmode 77* (121); Domnic Muthuswami 1/30 (10 overs)

Baroda won by 8 wickets
Feroz Shah Kotla, Delhi
Umpires: Anil Chaudhary and Tapan Sharma

- Baroda won the toss and elected to field.
- Naushad Shaikh (Maharashtra) made his List A debut.

15 December 2015
Scorecard

Vidarbha; 324/5 (50 overs)	v	Tripura; 166 (47.4 overs)
Ganesh Satish 140* (134); Rana Dutta 2/57 (10 overs)		Sanjay Majumder 39 (48); Akshay Wakhare 3/29 (9 overs)

Vidarbha won by 158 runs
Palam B Ground, Model Sports Complex, Delhi
Umpires: Nand Kishore and Krishnamachari Srinivasan

- Tripura won the toss and elected to field.

=== Round six ===
17 December 2015
Scorecard

Andhra; 87 (25.3 overs)	v	Vidarbha; 91/0 (19.2 overs)
Prasanth Kumar 38 (61); Akshay Karnewar 4/13 (5 overs)		Jitesh Sharma 47* (54)

Vidarbha won by 10 wickets
Palam B Ground, Delhi
Umpires: Anil Chaudhary and Rohan Pandit

- Vidarbha won the toss and elected to field.
- Karthik Raman (Andhra) made his List A debut.

17 December 2015
Scorecard

Tripura; 58 (22.2 overs)	v	Baroda; 61/4 (6.1 overs)
Manisankar Murasingh 10 (22); Swapnil Singh 5/25 (10 overs)		Ambati Rayudu 31* (15) pardeep 3/27 (3.1 overs)

Baroda won by 6 wickets
Palam A Ground, Delhi
Umpires: Krishnamachari Bharatan and Krishnamachari Srinivasan

- Tripura won the toss and elected to bat.

17 December 2015
Scorecard

Maharashtra; 194/9 (50 overs)	v	Delhi; 197/5 (48.4 overs)
Kedar Jadhav 48 (46); Manan Sharma 3/21 (10 overs)		Milind Kumar 58* (59); Swapnil Gugale 2/39 (10 overs)

Delhi won by 5 wickets
Feroz Shah Kotla, Delhi
Umpires: Nand Kishore and Tapan Sharma

- Delhi won the toss and elected to field.

=== Round seven ===
18 December 2015
Scorecard

Andhra; 183 (49.2 overs)	v	Delhi; 184/1 (34.1 overs)
Duvvarapu Siva Kumar 38 (60); Pawan Negi 3/29 (10 overs)		Unmukt Chand 118* (99)

Delhi won by 9 wickets
Feroz Shah Kotla, Delhi
Umpires: Krishnamachari Bharatan and Rohan Pandit

- Delhi won the toss and elected to field.
- Himmat Singh (Delhi) made his List A debut.

18 December 2015
Scorecard

Maharashtra; 184 (48.2 overs)	v	Vidarbha; 185/6 (47 overs)
Ankit Bawne 48 (72); Akshay Karnewar 4/43 (10 overs)		Ganesh Satish 71* (100); Shamshuzama Kazi 3/45 (7 overs)

Vidarbha won by 4 wickets
Palam B Ground, Delhi
Umpires: Anil Chaudhary and Nand Kishore

- Vidarbha won the toss and elected to field.

18 December 2015
Scorecard

Tripura; 206 (49.2 overs)	v	Odisha; 169 (44.3 overs)
Parvinder Singh 65 (104); Deepak Behera 2/26 (7 overs)		Deepak Behera 29 (33); Chiranjit Paul 3/34 (9.4 overs)

Tripura won by 37 runs
Palam A Ground, Delhi
Umpires: Krishnamachari Srinivasan and Shavir Tarapore

- Tripura won the toss and elected to bat.
