= Ravi Kumar =

Ravi Kumar is an Indian male given name, which means "Son of the Sun", combining the Sanskrit words "Ravi" (Sun) and "Kumar" (Son).

It may refer to:

== Film ==
- Matta Ravikumar (died 2006), also known as Ravi Kumar, leader of the Communist Party of India (Maoist)
- Ravi Kumar, a fictional character portrayed by Himesh Reshammiya in the Indian films The Xposé (2014) and Badass Ravi Kumar (2025)
- R. Ravi Kumar, Indian director of Indru Netru Naalai (2015 film)

== Sports ==
- Ravi Kumar (footballer) (born 1993), Indian footballer
- Ravi Kumar (sport shooter) (born 1990), Indian sport shooter
- Ravi Kumar Dahiya, Indian wrestler
- Ravi Kumar Punia (born 1993), Indian footballer, defender

== Other ==
- Ravi Kumar (Pakistani politician), in Khyber Pakhtunkhwa
- Ravi Kumar Narra, Indian businessman and social worker
- Ravi Kumar Singisetti, Indian businessman
- R. Ravi Kumar, Indian surgeon

== See also ==
- Ravinder Kumar (disambiguation)
- Ravikumar, alternative spelling of the Indian male given name
  - Ravikumar (actor), Indian actor in Malayalam cinema during the 1970s and 1980s
  - Ravikumar (writer) Indian writer and politician
  - Ravikumar Gowda Ganiga, Indian politician
  - Ravikumar Niranjan, Bishop of Northern Karnataka of the Church of South India
  - Ravikumar Samarth, Indian cricketer
  - Ravikumar Thakur (born 1984), Indian cricketer
  - K. S. Ravikumar (born 1958), Indian film director and actor
