= 2013–14 Deodhar Trophy =

- Administrator: BCCI
- Cricket format: List A cricket
- Tournament format: Knockout
- Host: Visakhapatnam
- Champions: West Zone (12th title)
- Participants: 5
- Matches: 4
- Most runs: Cheteshwar Pujara (WZ) (135)
- Most wickets: Piyush Chawla (CZ) (9)

2013–14 Deodhar Trophy was the 41st season of the Deodhar Trophy, a List A cricket tournament contested by 5 zonal teams of India: Central Zone, East Zone, North Zone, South Zone and West Zone.

== Schedule ==
The 2013–14 Deodhar Trophy consisted of four matches played between the teams, where the two teams that performed the worst in the 2012–13 season of the Deodhar Trophy, East Zone and Central Zone, had to play each other in an additional knockout game to progress to the semifinals.

The schedule:

1. 23 March - Quarterfinal - Central Zone vs East Zone
2. 24 March - Semifinal1 - North Zone vs South Zone
3. 25 March - Semifinal2 - West Zone vs Winner Quarterfinal
4. 27 March - Final - Winner Semifinal1 vs Winner Semifinal2

== Squads ==
Squads
| Central Zone | East Zone | North Zone | South Zone | West Zone |
|---|---|---|---|---|
| Faiz Fazal | Ishank Jaggi | Gautam Gambhir | Robin Uthappa | Kedar Devdhar |
| Jalaj Saxena | Parvez Aziz | Virender Sehwag | Murali Vijay | Parthiv Patel (wk) |
| Shalabh Srivastava | Shreevats Goswami (wk) | Unmukt Chand | Lokesh Rahul | Cheteshwar Pujara (c) |
| Naman Ojha (wk) | Manoj Tiwary | Prashant Chopra | Baba Aparajith | Ambati Rayudu |
| Mahesh Rawat (wk) | Saurabh Tiwary | Nitin Saini (wk) | Manish Pandey | Kedar Jadhav |
| Akshdeep Nath | Natraj Behera | Mandeep Singh | Dinesh Karthik (wk) | Arpit Vasavada |
| Rongsen Jonathan | Kumar Deobrat | Nikhil Gangta | Ricky Bhui | Sushant Marathe (wk) |
| Urvesh Patel (wk) | Wriddhiman Saha (wk) | Rajat Paliwal | Sanju Samson | Suryakumar Yadav |
| Amit Paunikar | Laxmi Ratan Shukla (c) | Milind Kumar | Karun Nair | Yusuf Pathan |
| Puneet Yadav | Shahbaz Nadeem | Gurkeerat Singh | Sagun Kamat | Akshar Patel |
| Ashish Yadav | Samar Quadri | Parvez Rasool | Pragyan Ojha | Jesal Karia |
| Jitesh Sharma (wk) | Deepak Behera | Rishi Dhawan | Rahil Shah | Dhawal Kulkarni |
| Piyush Chawla (c) | Abu Nechim | Harbhajan Singh (c) | Vinay Kumar (c) | Jasprit Bumrah |
| Karn Sharma | Ashok Dinda | Avishek Sinha | Abhimanyu Mithun | Samad Fallah |
| Anureet Singh | Rahul Shukla | Abhishek Sakuja | Yo Mahesh | Jaydev Unadkat |
| Ishwar Pandey | | Siddarth Kaul | Prasanth Parameswaran |
| Umesh Yadav | | Ashish Nehra |
| Krishnakant Upadhyay | | Ishant Sharma |
| Amit Mishra | | Suraj Yadav |

== Results ==
=== Quarterfinal ===
23 March 2014
Scorecard

| East Zone; 194 (46.2 overs) | v | Central Zone; 198/8 (43 overs) |
| Kumar Deobrat 39 (47); Piyush Chawla 5/38 (10.2 overs) | | Naman Ojha 65* (84); Abu Nechim 3/36 (9 overs) |

Central Zone won by 2 wickets
ACA-VDCA Stadium, Visakhapatnam
Player of the match: Naman Ojha (CZ)

- East Zone won the toss and elected to bat
- Central Zone advanced to the semifinal

=== Semifinal 1 ===
24 March 2014
Scorecard

| North Zone; 265/7 (50 overs) | v | South Zone; 165 (36.3 overs) |
| Rajat Paliwal 107* (113); Vinay Kumar 3/57 (10 overs) | | Karun Nair 51* (57); Parvez Rasool 3/15 (4.3 overs) |

North Zone won by 100 runs
ACA-VDCA Stadium, Visakhapatnam
Player of the match: Rajat Paliwal (NZ)

- South Zone won the toss and elected to field
- North Zone advanced to the final

=== Semifinal 2 ===
25 March 2014
Scorecard

| West Zone; 233/9 (50 overs) | v | Central Zone; 191 (44.3 overs) |
| Yusuf Pathan 70 (57); Piyush Chawla 4/54 (12 overs) | | Shalabh Srivastava 65 (115); Dhawal Kulkarni 4/39 (11 overs) |

West Zone won by 42 runs
ACA-VDCA Stadium, Visakhapatnam
Player of the match: Dhawal Kulkarni (WZ)

- West Zone won the toss and elected to field
- West Zone advanced to the final

=== Final ===
27 March 2014
Scorecard

| West Zone; 281/3 (50 overs) | v | North Zone; 148 (37.1 overs) |
| Kedar Devdhar 94 (101); Rishi Dhawan 2/46 (11 overs) | | Mandeep Singh 37 (66); Arpit Vasavada 3/20 (6.1 overs) |

West Zone won by 133 runs
ACA-VDCA Stadium, Visakhapatnam
Player of the match: Kedar Devdhar (WZ)

- West Zone won the toss and elected to bat
- West Zone won the Deodhar Trophy for 2013-14
