= Stalin (disambiguation) =

Joseph Stalin (1878–1953) was the leader of the Soviet Union from the mid-1920s until his death in 1953.

Stalin may also refer to:

== Name ==
- Stalin (name), a given name and surname
- M. K. Stalin (born 1953), Indian politician and Chief Minister of Tamil Nadu
- Joseph Stalin (trade unionist), Sri Lankan trade unionist

== Books ==
- Stalin (Radzinsky book), a 1997 biography of Joseph Stalin by Edvard Radzinsky
- Stalin: An Appraisal of the Man and His Influence, a 1946 biography of Joseph Stalin by Leon Trotsky

== Films ==
- Roy Stalin, a character from the film Better Off Dead
- Stalin (1992 film), a telefilm starring Robert Duvall
- Stalin (2006 film), an Indian film starring Chiranjeevi

== Places ==
- Stalino, name of Donetsk, USSR in 1924–1961
- Stalingrad, name of Volgograd, USSR in 1925–1961
- Stalinabad, name of Dushanbe, USSR in 1929–1961
- Stalinsk, name of Novokuznetsk, USSR in 1932–1969
- Stalinogorsk, name of Novomoskovsk, USSR in 1934–1961
- Staliniri, name of Tskhinvali, USSR in 1934–1961
- Stalin, name of Varna, Bulgaria in 1949–1956
- Stalin, name of Brașov, Romania in 1950–1960
- Qyteti Stalin, name of Kuçovë, Albania in 1950–1990
- Sztálinváros, name of Dunaújváros, Hungary in 1951–1961
- Stalinstadt, name of Eisenhüttenstadt, East Germany in 1953–1961
- Stalinogród, name of Katowice, Poland in 1953–1956

== Ships ==
- Iosif Stalin class passenger ship
- Iosif Stalin class steamship
- Sibir (1937 icebreaker), until 1956 named Iosef Stalin
- Steamer Tovarich Stalin

== Other uses ==
- Iosef Stalin tank, a Soviet tank
- Stalin (Scheme implementation), an implementation of the Scheme programming language
- The Stalin, a Japanese punk rock band

== See also ==
- List of places named after Joseph Stalin
