= Sarpam =

- Theatrical release poster
- Directed by: Baby
- Written by: Baby; Dr. Balakrishnan (dialogues)
- Screenplay by: Dr. Balakrishnan
- Produced by: Dhanya
- Starring: Prem Nazir; Jayan; Ravikumar; Vidhubala
- Cinematography: P. S. Nivas
- Music by: K. J. Joy; Lyrics: Bichu Thirumala
- Release date: 1979
- Country: India
- Language: Malayalam

Sarpam is a 1979 Indian Malayalam-language film, directed by Baby and produced by Dhanya. The film stars Prem Nazir, Jayan, Ravikumar, Vidhubala and Seema. The film has musical score by K. J. Joy.

== Plot ==
Ramesh is married to a traditional woman Latha who esteems snakes very much. Ramesh's friend James is courting a firebrand, Daisy, and tries to impress her with his bravery and derring-do. But she's disgusted by his arrogance and inclination to pick fights. Their fights reach a point where Daisy's pet python breaks James's hand as he harasses her. Daisy's father -a scientist experimenting with snake venom- is delighted with James's courtship of his daughter. He advises both of them to ensure they end up together. A sheepish James is told to behave like a human being and not like an animal. Daisy's father apprises her of James's loveless family background and asks her to treat him kindly. James apologizes to Daisy and she decides to forgive him after observing his conduct for a while and deciding that the apology is genuine. She agrees to James's proposal. No sooner do they realize that their mutual friends Ramesh and Latha are in danger from Ramesh's uncle and rushes over to help Ramesh after they discover his house burned and him getting beaten up by his uncle's goons. However it is left to the snakes to enact the final revenge.

== Cast ==
- Prem Nazir as Ramesh
- Jayan as James
- Ravikumar as Shamsu
- Vidhubala as Latha
- Seema as Daisy
- Bhavani as Saheera
- Jagathy Sreekumar as Stephen
- Kaviyoor Ponnamma as Bhavani
- Jose Prakash as Dr. Fernandez
- Prathapachandran as Ramesh's uncle, father
- Sukumari as Saheera's mother

== Soundtrack ==
The music was composed by K. J. Joy and the lyrics were written by Bichu Thirumala.

No.	Song	Singers	Length (m:ss)
1	"Aayiram Thalayulla"	P. Jayachandran, Vani Jairam, B. Vasantha, Chorus	
2	"Aayiram Thalayulla" (Bit)	P. Jayachandran, Chorus	
3	"Ezhaam Maalikamele"	K. J. Yesudas, Vani Jairam	
4	"Kunkuma Sandhyakalo"	K. J. Yesudas	
5	"Swarnameeninte Chelotha"	K. J. Yesudas, P. Susheela, Vani Jairam, S. P. Balasubrahmanyam	
6	"Vaadakaveedozhinju"	P. Susheela	
