= 2014–15 Deodhar Trophy =

- Dates: 29 November 2014 – 3 December 2014
- Administrator: BCCI
- Cricket format: List A cricket
- Tournament format: Knockout
- Host: Mumbai
- Champions: East Zone (5th title)
- Participants: 5
- Matches: 4
- Most runs: Manoj Tiwary (EZ) (226)
- Most wickets: Ashok Dinda (EZ) (6)

2014–15 Deodhar Trophy was the 42nd season of the Deodhar Trophy, a List A cricket tournament contested by the five zonal teams of India: Central Zone, East Zone, North Zone, South Zone and West Zone. The tournament consisted of four matches, all of which were hosted by the Wankhede Stadium in Mumbai.

East Zone won the tournament after beating the defending champions West Zone in the final by 24 runs.

== Schedule ==
The 2014–15 Deodhar Trophy consisted of four matches played between the teams, where the two teams that performed the worst in the 2013–14 season of the Deodhar Trophy, Central Zone and South Zone, had to play each other in an additional knockout game to progress to the semifinals.

The schedule:

1. 29 November - Quarterfinal - Central Zone vs South Zone
2. 30 November - Semifinal1 - East Zone vs North Zone
3. 1 December - Semifinal2 - West Zone vs Winner Quarterfinal
4. 2 December - Final - Winner Semifinal1 vs Winner Semifinal2

== Squads ==
Central Zone	East Zone	North Zone	South Zone	West Zone
Piyush Chawla (c); Anand Bais; Swapnil Bandiwar; Mukul Dagar; Arjit Gupta; Abhishek Kaushik; Ashok Menaria; Akshdeep Nath; Ishwar Pandey; Mahesh Rawat (wk); Jalaj Saxena; Jitesh Sharma (wk); Anureet Singh; Pankaj Singh; Kuldeep Yadav	Manoj Tiwary (c); Parvez Aziz; Deepak Behera; Pritam Das; Kumar Deobrat; Ashok Dinda; Shreevats Goswami (wk); Ishank Jaggi; Sourashish Lahiri; Shahbaz Nadeem; Rahul Shukla; Arabind Singh; Virat Singh; Saurabh Tiwary	Harbhajan Singh (c); Unmukt Chand; Rishi Dhawan; Taruwar Kohli; Milind Kumar; Amit Mishra; Parvez Rasool; Sandeep Sharma; Mohit Sharma; Gurkeerat Singh; Mandeep Singh; Yuvraj Singh; Vikas Tokas; Nakul Verma (wk); Manan Vohra	Vinay Kumar (c); Mayank Agarwal; Baba Aparajith; Sachin Baby; Stuart Binny; Amogh Desai; Darshan Misal; Abhimanyu Mithun; Karun Nair; Manish Pandey; Ashish Reddy; Sanju Samson (wk); CV Stephen; Robin Uthappa (wk); Amit Yadav	Yusuf Pathan (c); Ankit Bawne; Deepak Hooda; Shreyas Iyer; Sheldon Jackson (wk); Kedar Jadhav; Domnic Joseph; Rush Kalaria; Dhawal Kulkarni; Akshar Patel; Smit Patel (wk); Ambati Rayudu; Shardul Thakur; Arpit Vasavada; Suryakumar Yadav

== Results ==
Quarterfinal
Central Zone	180
South Zone	296/9

Semifinals
West Zone	319/8
South Zone	314/7
East Zone	273/8
North Zone	221

Final
West Zone	245
East Zone	269/8

=== Quarterfinal ===
29 November 2014
Scorecard

South Zone; 296/9 (50 overs)	v	Central Zone; 180 (36.3 overs)
Baba Aparajith 113 (105); Pankaj Singh 5/45 (10 overs)		Arjit Gupta 66 (49); Vinay Kumar 3/8 (6 overs)

South Zone won by 116 runs
Wankhede Stadium, Mumbai

- Central Zone won the toss and elected to field
- South Zone advanced to the semifinals

=== Semifinal 1 ===
30 November 2014
Scorecard

East Zone; 273/8 (50 overs)	v	North Zone; 221 (47.1 overs)
Manoj Tiwary 151 (121); Sandeep Sharma 3/49 (10 overs)		Gurkeerat Singh 83 (99); Sourashish Lahiri 3/41 (10 overs)

East Zone won by 52 runs
Wankhede Stadium, Mumbai

- North Zone won the toss and elected to field
- East Zone advanced to the final

=== Semifinal 2 ===
1 December 2014
Scorecard

South Zone; 314/7 (50 overs)	v	West Zone; 319/8 (47.1 overs)
Mayank Agarwal 86 (87); Dhawal Kulkarni 3/64 (10 overs)		Suryakumar Yadav 80 (56); Stuart Binny 3/66 (8 overs)

West Zone won by 2 wickets
Wankhede Stadium, Mumbai

- West Zone won the toss and elected to field
- West Zone advanced to the final

=== Final ===
3 December 2014
Scorecard

East Zone; 269/8 (50 overs)	v	West Zone; 245 (47.2 overs)
Manoj Tiwary 75 (92); Dhawal Kulkarni 2/35 (9 overs)		Kedar Jadhav 97 (91); Ashok Dinda 4/33 (9 overs)

East Zone won by 24 runs
Wankhede Stadium, Mumbai
Player of the match: Ashok Dinda (EZ)

- East Zone won the toss and elected to bat
- East Zone won the 2014–15 Deodhar Trophy
