= Stalin (name) =

Stalin (masculine, Russian: Сталин) or Stalina (feminine, Russian: Сталина) is a given name and a surname. It is strongly associated with Soviet leader Joseph Stalin.

== Surname ==
- Joseph Stalin (1878–1953), major figure in Russian and world history of the early to mid-20th century
- Joseph Stalin (trade unionist), Sri Lankan trade unionist
- Kerstin-Maria Stalín (born 1937), Swedish politician
- Rezauddin Stalin (born 1962), Bangladeshi poet and television personality
- Sanjeev Stalin (born 2001), Indian footballer
- Svetlana Alliluyeva (Stalina) (1926–2011), Soviet philologist, daughter of Joseph Stalin
- Udhayanidhi Stalin (born 1977), Indian film producer, son of M. K. Stalin
- Vasily Dzhugashvili Stalin (1921–1962), Soviet general, son of Joseph Stalin

== Given name ==
- Erick Stalin Morillo Calderón (2000–2023), Peruvian footballer
- M. K. Stalin (born 1953), Chief Minister of Tamil Nadu, Indian politician
- Stalin Colinet (born 1974), American football player
- Stalin González (born 1980), Venezuelan politician
- Stalin Hoover (born 1988), Indian cricketer
- Stalin K, Indian filmmaker
- Stalin Motta (born 1984), Colombian football player
- Stalin Ortiz (born 1981), Colombian basketball player
- Stalin Rivas (born 1971), Venezuelan football player
- Stalin Valencia (born 2003), Ecuadorian footballer

== See also ==
- Jovan Smith (born 1983), known as J. Stalin, American rapper
- Kuppuswami Srinivasan (1899–1975), known as Stalin Srinivasan, Indian journalist and independence activist
- Leroy Calliste (1941–2022), known as Black Stalin, Trinidadian calypso musician
