= Manik Gupta =

Indian cricketer (born 1990)

Personal information
- Full name: Manik Gupta
- Born: 16 December 1990 (age 35); Jammu, India
- Batting: Left-handed
- Bowling: Leg-break, googly
- Source: ESPNcricinfo, 21 October 2015

Manik Gupta (born 16 December 1990) is an Indian first-class cricketer who plays for Jammu and Kashmir. He made his Twenty20 debut for Jammu and Kashmir in the 2016–17 Inter State Twenty-20 Tournament on 29 January 2017.
