= Nishan Singh =

Indian cricketer (born 1987)

Personal information
- Born: 3 September 1987 (age 39); Rajasthan, India
- Source: ESPNcricinfo, 18 October 2015

Nishan Singh (born 3 September 1987) is an Indian first-class cricketer who plays for Services. He made his Twenty20 debut for Services in the 2016–17 Inter State Twenty-20 Tournament on 29 January 2017.
