= Pruthvipal Solanki =

Indian cricketer (born 1990)

Personal information
- Born: 14 February 1990 (age 36)
- Source: Cricinfo, 19 November 2020

Pruthvipal Solanki (born 14 February 1990) is an Indian cricketer. He made his List A debut on 3 March 2014, for Saurashtra in the 2013–14 Vijay Hazare Trophy.
