= Sairaj Patil =

Indian cricketer (born 1996)

Personal information
- Full name: Sairaj Bipin Patil
- Born: 31 October 1996 (age 30); Thane, Maharashtra, India
- Batting: Right-handed
- Bowling: Right arm medium
- Source: ESPNcricinfo, 29 January 2017

Sairaj Patil (born 31 October 1996) is an Indian cricketer. He made his Twenty20 debut for Mumbai in the 2016–17 Inter State Twenty-20 Tournament on 29 January 2017. He made his List A debut on 8 December 2021, for Mumbai in the 2021–22 Vijay Hazare Trophy.
