= Pushkaraj Chavan =

Indian cricketer (born 1989)

Personal information
- Full name: Pushkaraj Sudhakar Chavan
- Born: 18 May 1989 (age 37); Mumbai, Maharashtra
- Batting: Left-handed
- Bowling: Slow left-arm orthodox
- Role: All-rounder

Domestic team information
- Years: Team
- 2013–2014: Maharashtra
- Source: ESPNcricinfo, 15 May 2016

Pushkaraj Sudhakar Chavan (born 18 May 1989) is an Indian former cricketer who played for Maharashtra and was signed by Rajasthan Royals in 2009 IPL. He is left-hand batsman who can bowls slow left-arm orthodox balls. He made his List A debut on 27 February 2014, for Maharashtra in the 2013–14 Vijay Hazare Trophy.
