= Ravikumar =

Ravikumar is Hindu given name, which means "Son of the Sun", combining the Sanskrit words "Ravi" (Sun) and "Kumar" (Son). The name may refer to:

- Ravikumar (actor) (born 1953), Indian actor
- Ravikumar (writer) (born 1961), Indian writer
- Ravikumar Samarth (born 1993), Indian cricketer
- Ravikumar Thakur (born 1984), Indian cricketer
- Ravikumar R., Indian director

Ravikumar TS writer born 1964

== See also ==
- Ravi (disambiguation)
- Ravi Kumar (disambiguation)
