= Rakesh Prabhu =

Indian cricketer

Personal information
- Full name: Rakesh Prabhu
- Source: ESPNcricinfo, 29 January 2017

Rakesh Prabhu is an Indian cricketer. He made his Twenty20 debut for Mumbai in the 2016–17 Inter State Twenty-20 Tournament on 29 January 2017.
