= Iqlas Naha =

Indian cricketer

Personal information
- Full name: V. P. Iqlas Naha
- Born: 11 October 1994 (age 32); Malappuram, Kerala, India
- Batting: Left-handed
- Bowling: Right-handed fast medium
- Role: All-rounder

Domestic team information
- Years: Team
- 2018–present: Puducherry
- Source: ESPNcricinfo, 19 September 2018

V. P Iqlas Naha (born 11 October 1994) is an Indian cricketer who represents Puducherry in domestic cricket. He is an all-rounder who bats left-handed and bowls right-arm fast-medium.

== Domestic career ==
Iqlas was born on Malappuram, Kerala. He has represented Kerala in age-limit tournaments. He completed his graduation from Mar Ivanios College, Thiruvananthapuram and was part of the college's cricket team. He was one of the four Kerala cricketers among Nikhilesh Surendran, Fabid Ahmed and Abdul Safar who shifted their alliance to the newly found Puducherry cricket team ahead of the 2018-19 Indian domestic season.

He made his List A debut for Puducherry in the 2018–19 Vijay Hazare Trophy on 19 September 2018 against Manipur on Puducherry's first ever domestic match but failed to get a chance to bat or bowl in the match. However, the next day, the Board of Control for Cricket in India (BCCI) facing protests from other state associations, the BCCI has revoked the special allowance granted to Puducherry which allowed to play players from outside the state the team is located in, after concerns were raised that no local cricketers had played in the match. Iqlas was one among the eight players who were found to be outside the BCCI's eligibility criteria which required the players to be either born in the state or be a resident for more than a year.

He plays for Tigers XI in Siechem Pondicherry T20 Tournament. He made his Twenty20 debut on 4 November 2021, for Puducherry in the 2021–22 Syed Mushtaq Ali Trophy.
