= 2016–17 Deodhar Trophy =

Cricket tournament

- Dates: 25 March 2017 – 29 March 2017
- Administrator: BCCI
- Cricket format: List A cricket
- Tournament format(s): Double round robin and Knockout
- Host: Visakhapatnam
- Champions: Tamil Nadu (1st title)
- Participants: 3
- Matches: 4
- Most runs: Dinesh Karthik (247)
- Most wickets: Dhawal Kulkarni (11)

2016–17 Deodhar Trophy was the 44th season of the Deodhar Trophy, a List A competition. It was played in a three team format between Tamil Nadu, who were the winners of 2016–17 Vijay Hazare Trophy, and two teams selected by the BCCI. Tamil Nadu won the trophy, after beating India B by 42 runs in the final.

== Squads ==
India A	India B	Tamil Nadu
Mayank Agarwal; Mandeep Singh; Shreyas Iyer; Ambati Rayudu; Manoj Tiwary; Rishabh Pant (wk); Deepak Hooda; Harbhajan Singh (c); Krunal Pandya; Shahbaz Nadeem; Siddarth Kaul; Shardul Thakur; Prasidh Krishna; Ruturaj Gaikwad; Pankaj Rao	Parthiv Patel (c, wk); Shikhar Dhawan; Manish Pandey; Harpreet Singh Bhatia; Shreevats Goswami (wk); Ishank Jaggi; Gurkeerat Mann; Axar Patel; Akshay Karnewar; Ashok Dinda; Kulwant Khejroliya; Dhawal Kulkarni; Govinda Poddar; Chama Milind	Vijay Shankar (c); Murugan Ashwin; Kaushik Gandhi; Narayan Jagadeesan (wk); J Kousik; Ramalingam Rohit; Rahil Shah; Washington Sundar; Antony Dhas; Ganga Sridhar Raju; Baba Indrajith; Dinesh Karthik (wk); M Mohammed; R Sai Kishore; Laxmesha Suryaprakash

== Group stage ==
=== Points table ===
Team	Pld	W	L	Tie	N/R	Pts	NRR
India B	2	2	0	0	0	8	+0.550
Tamil Nadu	2	1	1	0	0	4	+0.410
India A	2	0	2	0	0	0	–0.960

BCCI

=== Matches ===
25 March 2017
Scorecard

India B 327/8 (50 overs)	v	India A 304 (48.2 overs)
Shikhar Dhawan 128 (122); Siddarth Kaul 5/59 (10 overs)		Ambati Rayudu 92 (92); Akshay Karnewar 3/60 (9 overs)

India B won by 23 runs
Dr. Y.S. Rajasekhara Reddy ACA-VDCA Cricket Stadium, Visakhapatnam
Umpires: Anil Dandekar and Rohan Pandit

- India A won the toss and elected to field.

26 March 2017
Scorecard

India B 316/8 (50 overs)	v	Tamil Nadu; 284 (48.4 overs)
Manish Pandey 104 (110); Ravisrinivasan Sai Kishore 4/60 (10 overs)		Kaushik Gandhi 124 (134); Dhawal Kulkarni 3/45 (9 overs)

India B won by 32 runs
Dr. Y.S. Rajasekhara Reddy ACA-VDCA Cricket Stadium, Visakhapatnam
Umpires: Anil Dandekar and Rohan Pandit

- India B won the toss and elected to bat

27 March 2017
Scorecard

Tamil Nadu; 303/6 (50 overs)	v	India A 230 (44.4 overs)
Dinesh Karthik 93 (98); Shardul Thakur 3/49 (10 overs)		Mandeep Singh 97 (114); Rahil Shah 3/37 (10 overs)

Tamil Nadu won by 73 runs
Dr. Y.S. Rajasekhara Reddy ACA-VDCA Cricket Stadium, Visakhapatnam
Umpires: Anil Dandekar and Rohan Pandit

- Tamil Nadu won the toss and elected to bat

== Final ==
Final
29 March 2017
Scorecard

Tamil Nadu; 303/9 (50 overs)	v	India B 261 (46.1 overs)
Dinesh Karthik 126 (91); Dhawal Kulkarni 5/39 (10 overs)		Gurkeerat Singh 64 (85); Rahil Shah 3/40 (10 overs)

Tamil Nadu won by 42 runs
Dr. Y.S. Rajasekhara Reddy ACA-VDCA Cricket Stadium, Visakhapatnam
Umpires: Anil Dandekar and Rohan Pandit
Player of the match: Dinesh Karthik (Tamilnadu)

- Tamil Nadu won the toss and elected to bat.
