= Hemant Singh (cricketer) =

Indian cricketer (born 1988)

Personal information
- Born: 10 November 1988 (age 38); New Delhi, India
- Source: ESPNcricinfo, 29 January 2017

Hemant Singh (born 10 November 1988) is an Indian cricketer. He made his Twenty20 debut for Railways in the 2016–17 Inter State Twenty-20 Tournament on 29 January 2017.
