= 2013–14 Vijay Hazare Trophy =

Indian cricket tournament

- Dates: 27 February – 16 March 2014
- Administrator: BCCI
- Cricket format: List A cricket
- Tournament format(s): Round-robin and Playoff format
- Host: Various
- Champions: Karnataka (1st title)
- Runners-up: Railways

The 2013–14 Vijay Hazare Trophy was the 21st edition of the Vijay Hazare Trophy, an annual List A cricket tournament in India. It took place in February and March 2014. In the final, Karnataka beat Railways by four wickets to win their first title.

== Group stage ==
=== Central Zone ===
27 February 2014
Scorecard

Rajasthan; 181 (45.3 overs)	v	Vidarbha; 182/3 (36.1 overs)

Vidarbha won by 7 wickets

- Divya Pratap Singh, Chandrapal Singh, Aniket Choudhary (Rajasthan), Jitesh Sharma and Swapnil Bandiwar (Vidarbha) all made their List A debuts.

27 February 2014
Scorecard

Uttar Pradesh; 136/4 (20 overs)	v	Railways; 114/8 (20 overs)

Uttar Pradesh won by 22 runs

- Hardik Rathod (Railways) made his List A debut.

28 February 2014
Scorecard

Railways	v	Vidarbha

Match abandoned

28 February 2014
Scorecard

Madhya Pradesh; 137/6 (20 overs)	v	Uttar Pradesh; 137/9 (20 overs)

Match tied

- Salman Baig, Yogesh Rawat and Puneet Datey (Madhya Pradesh) all made their List A debuts.

2 March 2014
Scorecard

Railways; 256/6 (50 overs)	v	Madhya Pradesh; 248/9 (50 overs)

Railways won by 8 runs

- Sohraab Dhaliwal (Madhya Pradesh) made his List A debut.

2 March 2014
Scorecard

Rajasthan; 171 (48.3 overs)	v	Uttar Pradesh; 173/5 (38.1 overs)

Uttar Pradesh won by 5 wickets

- Chetan Bist (Rajasthan) made his List A debut.

3 March 2014
Scorecard

Vidarbha; 257 (49.3 overs)	v	Madhya Pradesh; 247 (49.3 overs)

Vidarbha won by 10 runs

- Shubham Sharma (Madhya Pradesh) made his List A debut.

3 March 2014
Scorecard

Rajasthan; 77 (26 overs)	v	Railways; 79/2 (10 overs)

Railways won by 8 wickets

- Aristh Singhvi (Rajasthan) made his List A debut.

=== East Zone ===
27 February 2014
Scorecard

Tripura; 166 (46.4 overs)	v	Assam; 148/1 (29.3 overs)

Assam won by 80 runs (VJD method)

- Rishav Das (Assam), Saurabh Das and Viki Saha (Tripura) all made their List A debuts.

27 February 2014
Scorecard

Bengal; 202 (49.2 overs)	v	Odisha; 95/6 (22.3 overs)

Bengal won by 38 runs (VJD method)

- Boddupalli Amit (Bengal) and Abhilash Mallick (Odisha) both made their List A debuts.

1 March 2014
Scorecard

Assam; 128/6 (16.5 overs)	v	Odisha

No result

1 March 2014
Scorecard

Jharkhand	v	Tripura

Match abandoned

3 March 2014
Scorecard

Odisha; 124 (37.4 overs)	v	Tripura; 127/4 (30 overs)

Tripura won by 6 wickets

- Anurag Sarangi (Odisha) made his List A debut.

3 March 2014
Scorecard

Jharkhand; 273/9 (50 overs)	v	Bengal; 137 (34.1 overs)

Jharkhand won by 136 runs

- Ashish Yadav, Virat Singh, Kaushal Singh and Samar Quadri (Jharkhand) all made their List A debuts.

=== North Zone ===
27 February 2014
Scorecard

Delhi; 256/8 (50 overs)	v	Jammu & Kashmir; 218 (45.4 overs)

Delhi won by 38 runs

- Mohammed Mudhasir (Jammu & Kashmir) made his List A debut.

27 February 2014
Scorecard

Haryana; 153/8 (32 overs)	v	Punjab; 146/8 (32 overs)

Haryana won by 7 runs

- Manan Vohra and Gitansh Khera (Punjab) both made their List A debuts.

27 February 2014
Scorecard

Services; 233/9 (50 overs)	v	Himachal Pradesh; 222 (48.5 overs)

Services won by 11 runs

- Ankit Kalsi (Himachal Pradesh) and Diwesh Pathania (Services) both made their List A debuts.

1 March 2014
Scorecard

Haryana	v	Himachal Pradesh

Match abandoned

1 March 2014
Scorecard

Services; 171/8 (32 overs)	v	Jammu & Kashmir; 169/9 (32 overs)

Services won by 2 runs

1 March 2014
Scorecard

Delhi; 228 (49.1 overs)	v	Punjab; 232/4 (47 overs)

Punjab won by 6 wickets

- Jiwanjot Singh (Punjab) made his List A debut.

3 March 2014
Scorecard

Haryana; 171 (50 overs)	v	Services; 172/5 (45.4 overs)

Services won by 5 wickets

3 March 2014
Scorecard

Jammu & Kashmir; 199/9 (50 overs)	v	Punjab; 200/2 (37 overs)

Punjab won by 8 wickets

3 March 2014
Scorecard

Himachal Pradesh; 230 (49.5 overs)	v	Delhi; 234/5 (49.1 overs)

Delhi won by 5 wickets

- Ankush Bains (Himachal Pradesh) made his List A debut.

=== South Zone ===
27 February 2014
Scorecard

Andhra; 97 (30.3 overs)	v	Karnataka; 98/4 (23.2 overs)

Karnataka won by 6 wickets

- Kakani Harish (Andhra) made his List debut.

27 February 2014
Scorecard

Goa; 122 (36.2 overs)	v	Tamil Nadu; 126/3 (33.2 overs)

Tamil Nadu won by 7 wickets

- Shahrukh Khan (Tamil Nadu) made his List A debut.

27 February 2014
Scorecard

Kerala; 107 (33.5 overs)	v	Hyderabad; 108/1 (30 overs)

Hyderabad won by 9 wickets

- Nikhilesh Surendran (Kerala) made his List A debut.

28 February 2014
Scorecard

Andhra; 126 (41.3 overs)	v	Tamil Nadu; 132/2 (30.1 overs)

Tamil Nadu won by 8 wickets

28 February 2014
Scorecard

Karnataka; 248/8 (50 overs)	v	Hyderabad; 248/7 (50 overs)

Match tied

28 February 2014
Scorecard

Goa; 231 (49 overs)	v	Kerala; 232/7 (48.5 overs)

Kerala won by 3 wickets

2 March 2014
Scorecard

Goa; 268/6 (50 overs)	v	Andhra; 272/6 (48.4 overs)

Andhra won by 4 wickets

- Ricky Bhui (Andhra) and Lakshay Garg (Goa) both made their List A debuts.

2 March 2014
Scorecard

Karnataka; 317/5 (50 overs)	v	Kerala; 213 (46.2 overs)

Karnataka won by 104 runs

2 March 2014
Scorecard

Tamil Nadu; 280/4 (45 overs)	v	Hyderabad; 155 (35.5 overs)

Tamil Nadu won by 125 runs

- Krishnamoorthy Vignesh (Tamil Nadu) made his List A debut.

3 March 2014
Scorecard

Hyderabad; 166 (47.5 overs)	v	Andhra; 167/4 (40.1 overs)

Andhra won by 6 wickets

3 March 2014
Scorecard

Karnataka; 312/9 (45 overs)	v	Goa; 241 (43.2 overs)

Karnataka won by 71 runs

- Sayed Badiuzzama (Goa) made his List A debut.

3 March 2014
Scorecard

Kerala	v	Tamil Nadu

Match abandoned

=== West Zone ===
27 February 2014
Scorecard

Baroda; 346/3 (50 overs)	v	Mumbai; 302/9 (50 overs)

Baroda won by 44 runs

- Bravish Shetty, Sujit Nayak, Shardul Thakur and Saurabh Netravalkar (Mumbai) all made their List A debuts.

27 February 2014
Scorecard

Gujarat; 315/7 (50 overs)	v	Maharashtra; 188 (38.2 overs)

Gujarat won by 127 runs

- Dhruv Raval, Himalaya Barad, Kamlesh Thakor (Gujarat), Nikhil Naik and Pushkaraj Chavan (Maharashtra) all made their List A debuts.

28 February 2014
Scorecard

Maharashtra; 254/8 (50 overs)	v	Saurashtra; 250 (50 overs)

Maharashtra won by 4 runs

28 February 2014
Scorecard

Mumbai; 232 (50 overs)	v	Gujarat; 236/6 (49.5 overs)

Gujarat won by 4 wickets

2 March 2014
Scorecard

Gujarat; 239/8 (50 overs)	v	Baroda; 166 (38.2 overs)

Gujarat won by 73 runs

2 March 2014
Scorecard

Saurashtra; 244/7 (50 overs)	v	Mumbai; 248/5 (48.3 overs)

Mumbai won by 5 wickets

- Sarfaraz Khan (Mumbai) made his List A debut.

3 March 2014
Scorecard

Maharashtra; 271/7 (50 overs)	v	Mumbai; 196/9 (50 overs)

Maharashtra won by 75 runs

3 March 2014
Scorecard

Baroda; 289/7 (50 overs)	v	Saurashtra; 279/7 (50 overs)

Baroda won by 10 runs

- Pruthvipal Solanki and Abhishek Bhat (Saurashtra) both made their List A debuts.

== Final ==
16 March 2014
Scorecard

Railways; 157 (47.4 overs)	v	Karnataka; 158/6 (43 overs)
Rongsen Jonathan 46 (57); Abhimanyu Mithun 4/19 (9.4 overs)		Karun Nair 53* (86); Krishnakant Upadhyay 3/30 (9 overs)

Karnataka won by 4 wickets
Eden Gardens, Kolkata
Umpires: Chettithody Shamshuddin and Anil Chaudhary
Player of the match: Abhimanyu Mithun (Karnataka)

- Karnataka won the toss and elected to field.
