= Salman Baig =

Indian cricketer (born 1989)

Personal information
- Born: 7 May 1989 (age 37); Bhopal, Madhya Pradesh, India
- Batting: Right-handed
- Bowling: Right-arm medium

Domestic team information
- Years: Team
- 2010–2019: Madhya Pradesh
- Source: Cricinfo, 18 October 2017

Salman Baig (born 7 May 1989) is an Indian first-class cricketer who plays for Madhya Pradesh. He made his List A debut on 27 February 2014, for Madhya Pradesh in the 2013–14 Vijay Hazare Trophy.
