= Hiten Mehra =

Indian cricketer (born 1997)

Personal information
- Born: 18 December 1997 (age 28); Gujarat, India
- Source: ESPNcricinfo, 4 February 2017

Hiten Mehra (born 18 December 1997) is an Indian cricketer. He made his Twenty20 debut for Gujarat in the 2016–17 Inter State Twenty-20 Tournament on 4 February 2017.
