= Hardik Rathod =

Indian cricketer (born 1988)

Personal information
- Born: 6 September 1988 (age 38); Rajkot, India
- Source: ESPNcricinfo, 20 February 2017

Hardik Rathod (born 6 September 1988) is an Indian cricketer. He made his first-class debut for Saurashtra in the 2010–11 Ranji Trophy on 17 November 2010. He made his List A debut on 27 February 2014, for Railways in the 2013–14 Vijay Hazare Trophy.
