= Yogesh Rawat =

Indian cricketer (born 1992)

Personal information
- Full name: Yogeshsingh Bharatsingh Rawat
- Born: 28 December 1992 (age 33); Pauri Garhwal, Uttarakhand, India
- Batting: Right-handed
- Bowling: Right-arm medium

Domestic team information
- Years: Team
- 2014: Madhya Pradesh
- Source: Cricinfo, 10 October 2015

Yogeshsingh Bharatsingh Rawat (born 28 December 1992) is an Indian cricketer who plays for Madhya Pradesh. He made his List A debut on 27 February 2014, for Madhya Pradesh in the 2013–14 Vijay Hazare Trophy.
