= Viki Saha =

Indian cricketer (born 1997)

Personal information
- Full name: Viki Khokan Saha
- Born: 31 December 1997 (age 28); Agartala, Tripura
- Source: Cricinfo, 21 October 2015

Viki Saha (born 31 December 1997) is an Indian first-class cricketer who plays for Tripura. He made his List A debut on 27 February 2014, for Tripura in the 2013–14 Vijay Hazare Trophy. He made his Twenty20 debut on 9 January 2016 in the 2015–16 Syed Mushtaq Ali Trophy.
