= Aristh Singhvi =

Indian cricketer (born 1992)

Arisht Singhvi
Personal information
- Full name: Arisht Sanjay Singhvi
- Born: 31 May 1992 (age 34); Jodhpur, Rajasthan, India
- Batting: Left-handed
- Bowling: Right-arm medium

Domestic team information
- Years: Team
- 2013-: Delhi Daredevils
- Source: ESPNcricinfo, 12 July 2013

Arisht Singhvi (born 31 May 1992, full name Arisht Sanjay Singhvi) is an Indian cricketer who plays for Rajasthan. He was born in Jodhpur, Rajasthan. He was brought by Delhi Daredevils for the 2013 Indian Premier League. He made his List A debut on 3 March 2014, for Rajasthan in the 2013–14 Vijay Hazare Trophy.
