= Israr Azim =

Indian cricketer (born 1990)

Israr Azeem Khan
Personal information
- Full name: Mohammad Israr Azeem Khan
- Born: 2 August 1990 (age 36); Saharanpur, Uttar Pradesh, India
- Batting: Right-handed
- Bowling: Right-arm medium

Domestic team information
- Years: Team
- 2015–2018: Uttar Pradesh
- Source: ESPNcricinfo, 12 November 2015

Israr Azeem Khan (born 2 August 1990) is an Indian cricketer who played for Uttar Pradesh. He made his first class debut in the 2015–16 Ranji Trophy on 15 October 2015. He made his List A debut on 10 December 2015 in the 2015–16 Vijay Hazare Trophy. He made his Twenty20 debut for Uttar Pradesh in the 2016–17 Inter State Twenty-20 Tournament on 5 February 2017.
