= Sayed Badiuzzama =

Indian cricketer (born 1992)

Personal information
- Full name: Sayed Abdul Azim Badiuzzama
- Born: 26 December 1992 (age 33)
- Source: Cricinfo, 19 November 2020

Sayed Badiuzzama (born 26 December 1992) is an Indian cricketer. He made his List A debut on 3 March 2014, for Goa in the 2013–14 Vijay Hazare Trophy.
