= Mukul Raghav =

Indian cricketer (born 1994)

Personal information
- Born: 22 September 1994 (age 32); Gwalior, India
- Source: ESPNcricinfo, 6 October 2016

Mukul Raghav (born 22 September 1994) is an Indian cricketer. He made his first-class debut for Madhya Pradesh in the 2016–17 Ranji Trophy on 6 October 2016. He made his Twenty20 debut for Madhya Pradesh in the 2016–17 Inter State Twenty-20 Tournament on 29 January 2017. He made his List A debut for Madhya Pradesh in the 2016–17 Vijay Hazare Trophy on 25 February 2017.
