= Nikhilesh Surendran =

Indian cricketer

Personal information
- Born: 24 October 1992 (age 34); Secunderabad, Telangana, India
- Batting: Right-handed
- Role: Wicketkeeper Batsman

Domestic team information
- Years: Team
- 2013- 2018: Kerala
- 2018- present: Puducherry
- Source: ESPNcricinfo, 11 October 2015

Nikhilesh Surendran (born 24 October 1992) is an Indian cricketer who has represented Kerala and presently Pundecherry in domestic cricket. He is a right-handed wicket-keeper and batsman.

== Domestic career ==
Nikhilesh made his Twenty20 debut on 17 March 2013, for Kerala in the 2012–13 Syed Mushtaq Ali Trophy. He made his First class debut on 27 October 2013, for Kerala in the 2013–14 Ranji Trophy. He made his List A debut on 27 February 2014, for Kerala in the 2013–14 Vijay Hazare Trophy.

He was one of the four Kerala cricketers among Iqlas Naha, Fabid Ahmed and Abdul Safar who shifted their alliance to the newly found Puducherry cricket team ahead of the 2018-19 Indian domestic season.

He made his List A debut for Puducherry in the 2018–19 Vijay Hazare Trophy on 19 September 2018 against Manipur on Puducherry's first ever domestic match but failed to get a chance to bat or bowl in the match. However, the next day, the Board of Control for Cricket in India (BCCI) facing protests from other state associations, the BCCI has revoked the special allowance granted to Puducherry which allowed to play players from outside the state the team is located in, after concerns were raised that no local cricketers had played in the match. Nikhilesh was one among the eight players who were found to be outside the BCCI's eligibility criteria which required the players to be either born in the state or be a resident for more than a year.
