= Sachin Shinde =

Indian cricketer (born 1991)

Personal information
- Born: 30 September 1991 (age 35) (Note: Date of birth listed as 29 September 1987 on CricketArchive and 30 September 1991 on ESPNcricinfo); Belgaum, India

Domestic team information
- Years: Team
- 2016/17: Services
- Source: ESPNcricinfo, 29 January 2017

Sachin Shinde (born 30 September 1991) is an Indian cricketer. He made his Twenty20 debut for Services in the 2016–17 Inter State Twenty-20 Tournament on 29 January 2017. He made his List A debut for Services in the 2016–17 Vijay Hazare Trophy on 28 February 2017.
