= Tushar Arothe =

Indian cricketer

Personal information
- Full name: Tushar Bhalchandra Arothe
- Born: 17 September 1966 (age 60); Baroda, Gujarat, India
- Batting: Left-handed
- Bowling: Right-arm off break
- Role: All-rounder
- Relatives: Rishi Arothe (son)

Domestic team information
- Years: Team
- 1985/86–2003/04: Baroda

Career statistics
Competition	FC	List A
Matches	114	51
Runs scored	6,105	1,037
Batting average	37.22	28.02
100s/50s	13/31	0/5
Top score	171	87
Balls bowled	13,720	1,870
Wickets	225	30
Bowling average	30.09	47.83
5 wickets in innings	11	0
10 wickets in match	2	n/a
Best bowling	6/53	4/37
Catches/stumpings	71/–	20/–
- Source: ESPNcricinfo, 1 January 2016

Tushar Bhalchandra Arothe (born 17 September 1966) is a former Indian first-class cricketer who played for Baroda cricket team between the 1985/85 and 2003/04 seasons. He was the first player and is one of the two players to have appeared in more than 100 matches for Baroda. He became a cricket coach soon after his retirement.

== Career ==
Arothe played as an all-rounder who batted left-handed and bowled right-arm off break. He appeared in 114 first-class and 51 List A matches in a career that spanned 18 years between 1985/85 and 2003/04. He also captained Baroda in several matches and made appearances for the West Zone cricket team. He was the first player to play more than 100 matches for Baroda. With 107 appearances Arothe is second on the list of most appearances for Baroda, only one less than Connor Williams.

After his playing career, Arothe turned to coaching. He was appointed Baroda's assistant coach in 2004/05, as Baroda under-15 coach in 2005/06 and then as under-19 coach in 2006/07. From 2008 he worked for two years as coach of the Baroda women's team. He resigned from Baroda Cricket Association in 2010, after receiving an offer from Tripura Cricket Association. He worked as the coach of Chhattisgarh cricket team before getting appointed as the coach of the India national women's cricket team in 2013. He then returned to coach Baroda again in 2014, but resigned from the position in December 2015.

His son Rishi Arothe is also a first-class cricketer who plays for Baroda.
