= Abhishek Sakuja =

Indian cricketer (born 1987)

Personal information
- Full name: Abhishek Sakuja
- Born: 28 May 1987 (age 39); Delhi, India
- Batting: Left-handed
- Bowling: Slow left-arm orthodox
- Role: All-rounder

Domestic team information
- Years: Team
- 2008: Services
- 2013: North zone
- Source: Espncricinfo, 22 July 2018

Abhishek Sakuja (born 28 May 1987) is an Indian first-class cricketer who has played for the Services cricket team in the Ranji Trophy. He has represented the Services cricket team in the Vijay Hazare Trophy and the Syed Mushtaq Ali Trophy. He has also represented the North Zone team in the Deodhar Trophy in 2013/14 season. He also plays in the Karnataka Premier League, where he represents the Hubli Tigers team. He was the highest wicket taker in the 2017 edition of the Karnataka Premier League
