= Pappu Singh =

Indian cricketer (born 1993)

Personal information
- Born: 27 September 1993 (age 33); Ranchi, India
- Batting: Right handed
- Role: Wicketkeeper

Domestic team information
- Years: Team
- 2016–17: Railways
- Source: Cricinfo, 17 October 2015

Pappu Singh (born 27 September 1993) is an Indian first-class cricketer who plays for Jharkhand. He made his Twenty20 debut for Railways in the 2016–17 Inter State Twenty-20 Tournament on 5 February 2017.
