= Swapnil More =

Indian cricketer (born 1990)

Personal information
- Born: 14 June 1990 (age 36); Dhule, Maharashtra, India
- Source: ESPNcricinfo, 2 February 2017

Swapnil More (born 14 June 1990) is an Indian cricketer. He made his Twenty20 debut for Services in the 2016–17 Inter State Twenty-20 Tournament on 2 February 2017.
