= Sunil Yadav =

Indian cricketer (born 1991)

Personal information
- Full name: Sunil Harishkumar Yadav
- Born: 13 December 1991 (age 34); Azamgarh, Uttar Pradesh, India
- Batting: Right-handed
- Bowling: Leg break

Domestic team information
- Years: Team
- 2011/12-2015/16: Maharashtra
- 2016/17-2020/21: Saurashtra
- 2021/22: Maharashtra
- Source: ESPNcricinfo, 30 January 2017

Sunil Yadav (born 13 December 1991) is an Indian cricketer. He made his List A debut for Maharashtra in the 2011–12 Vijay Hazare Trophy on 22 February 2012. He made his Twenty20 debut for Saurashtra in the 2016–17 Inter State Twenty-20 Tournament on 2 February 2017.
