= Shweta Jadhav =

Indian cricketer (born 1985)

Shweta Rohidas Jadhav (born 27 December 1985) in a Maharashtrian cricketer in India. She has played 103 List A and 40 Women's Twenty20 matches. She was a part of India U21 women cricket team that toured Pakistan in the 2005–06 season. She has played for Maharashtra, Railways, Uttar Pradesh, Central Zone, West Zone.
