= Deodhar Trophy =

List A cricket knockout championship in India

Deodhar Trophy (Devdhar Trophy)
- Countries: India
- Administrator: BCCI
- Format: List A cricket
- First edition: 1973–74
- Latest edition: 2023
- Next edition: 2026
- Tournament format: Round Robin and Finals
- Number of teams: 6
- Current champion: South Zone (9th title)
- Most successful: North Zone (13 titles)
- Most runs: Riyan Parag
- Most wickets: Vidwath Kaverappa
- 2023 Deodhar Trophy

The Prof. D.B. Deodhar Trophy or simply Deodhar Trophy (also known as IDFC First Bank Deodhar Trophy due to sponsorship reasons), is a List A cricket domestic cricket tournament of India. It is named after D. B. Deodhar (known as the Grand Old Man of Indian cricket) and is a 50-over knockout competition played on an annual basis among the three national level teams – India A, India B and India C. India B are the current champions, winning the 2019–20 after defeating India C by 51 runs in the final.

== History and format ==
The competition was introduced in 1973–74 season as an inter-zonal tournament. From 1973–74 to 2014–15, two zonal teams played in a quarter-final, with the winner joining the other three zonal teams in the semi-finals. From there, it was a simple knockout tournament. From 2015–16 to 2017–18, the winners of the Vijay Hazare Trophy, India A and India B play each other in a round-robin format. The top two teams progress to the finals.

From 2018 to 2019, India A, India B and India C play each other in a round-robin format. The top two teams progress to the finals.

== Past winners ==
| Season | Winner |
|---|---|
| 1973–74 | South Zone |
| 1974–75 | South Zone |
| 1975–76 | West Zone |
| 1976–77 | Central Zone |
| 1977–78 | North Zone |
| 1978–79 | South Zone |
| 1979–80 | West Zone |
| 1980–81 | South Zone |
| 1981–82 | South Zone |
| 1982–83 | West Zone |
| 1983–84 | West Zone |
| 1984–85 | West Zone |
| 1985–86 | West Zone |
| 1986–87 | North Zone |
| 1987–88 | North Zone |
| 1988–89 | North Zone |
| 1989–90 | North Zone |
| 1990–91 | West Zone |
| 1991–92 | South Zone |
| 1992–93 | East Zone |
| 1993–94 | East Zone |
| 1994–95 | Central Zone |
| 1995–96 | North Zone |
| 1996–97 | East Zone |
| 1997–98 | North Zone |
| 1998–99 | Central Zone |
| 1999–2000 | North Zone |
| 2000–01 | South Zone and Central Zone (shared) |
| 2001–02 | South Zone |
| 2002–03 | North Zone |
| 2003–04 | East Zone |
| 2004–05 | North Zone |
| 2005–06 | North Zone |
| 2006–07 | West Zone |
| 2007–08 | Central Zone |
| 2008–09 | West Zone |
| 2009–10 | North Zone |
| 2010–11 | North Zone |
| 2011–12 | West Zone |
| 2012–13 | West Zone |
| 2013–14 | West Zone |
| 2014–15 | East Zone |
| 2015–16 | India A |
| 2016–17 | Tamil Nadu |
| 2017–18 | India B |
| 2018–19 | India C |
| 2019–20 | India B |
| 2023–24 | South Zone |
