= Ravinder Kumar =

Ravinder Kumar may refer to:

- Ravinder Kumar (historian) (1933–2001), Indian historian of Kashmiri descent
- Ravinder Kumar Dhir, advisor to Gujarat state for Defence and Aerospace Industries
- Ravinder Kumar Molhu (born Ravinder Kumar), Indian politician, member of the 15th and the 16th Legislative assemblies of Uttar Pradesh
- Ravinder Kumar (politician) (a.k.a. Ravi Dhiman, born 1961)
- Ravinder Kumar (serial killer), Indian serial killer
