= Alok Mangaraj =

Indian cricketer (born 1988)

Personal information
- Born: 28 November 1988 (age 37); Bhubaneswar, Orissa
- Batting: Right-handed
- Bowling: Right-arm medium
- Source: ESPNcricinfo, 30 May 2018

Alok Mangaraj (born 28 November 1988) is an Indian cricketer. He played the different formats of First-class cricket, List A cricket and T20 for the Orissa cricket team from 2011 to 2016.
