= Stalin Hoover =

Indian cricketer (born 1988)

Personal information
- Born: 26 November 1988 (age 37); Bangalore, India
- Source: ESPNcricinfo, 29 January 2017

Stalin Hoover (born 26 November 1988) is an Indian cricketer. He made his Twenty20 debut for Karnataka in the 2016–17 Inter State Twenty-20 Tournament on 29 January 2017.
