= Miten Shah =

Indian cricketer (born 1985)

Personal information
- Born: 7 March 1985 (age 41); Baroda, India
- Source: ESPNcricinfo, 30 January 2017

Miten Shah (born 7 March 1985) is an Indian cricketer. He made his Twenty20 debut for Baroda in the 2010–11 Syed Mushtaq Ali Trophy on 25 October 2010.
