= Pardeep =

Pardeep is an Indian given name. Pardeep: One who arrives as a ray of hope in times of despair.

The name "Pardeep" means a light that appears unexpectedly.

For example: It's like a ship getting lost in the sea, and on a dark night, not being able to see the shore. But then, a light suddenly shines; that's what "Pardeep" signifies.

Another example:

Imagine some people getting lost in a forest at night, and in the distance, they see a light; that's the meaning of "Pardeep." Notable people with the name include:

- Pardeep Mor, Indian field hockey player
- Pardeep Narwal, kabaddi player
- Pardeep Sahu, cricketer
- Pardeep Singh, weightlifter

== See also ==
- Pradeep Choudhary, Fijian politician
- Pradeep Sharma, police officer
