= 2005–06 Deodhar Trophy =

Indian cricket series edition

The 2005–06 Deodhar Trophy was a List A cricket tournament in India, competed for by the five zonal teams which contested the Duleep Trophy. The tournament was hosted by the Central Zone and won by the North Zone.

== Matches ==
=== Central Zone v West Zone (25 February) ===
Central Zone (4 pts) beat West Zone (0 pts) by 3 wickets

=== East Zone v South Zone (25 February) ===
South Zone (4) beat East Zone (0) by 3 wickets

=== Central Zone v North Zone (28 February) ===
North Zone (4) beat Central Zone (0) by 14 runs

=== East Zone v West Zone (28 February) ===
West Zone (4) beat East Zone (0) by 4 wickets

=== Central Zone v South Zone (3 March) ===
South Zone (5) beat Central Zone (-1) by 80 runs

=== North Zone v West Zone (3 March) ===
West Zone (4) beat North Zone (0) by 8 wickets

=== Central Zone v East Zone (6 March) ===
Central Zone (4) beat East Zone (0) by 1 wicket

=== North Zone v South Zone (6 March) ===
North Zone (5) beat South Zone (-1) by 74 runs

=== East Zone v North Zone (9 March) ===
North Zone (4) beat East Zone (0) by 51 runs (VJD method)

=== South Zone v West Zone (9 March) ===
South Zone (4) beat West Zone (0) by 2 runs

== Final table ==
2005–06 Deodhar Trophy
Pos	Team	Pld	W	L	NRR	Pts
1	North Zone	4	3	1	+2.27	14
2	West Zone	4	3	1	+1.12	12
3	South Zone	4	3	1	+0.86	12
4	Central Zone	4	1	3	-2.17	3
5	East Zone	4	0	4	-2.08	-1
