= Koripalli Sreekanth =

Indian cricketer (born 1992)

Personal information
- Born: 23 November 1992 (age 33); Hyderabad, India
- Batting: Right handed
- Bowling: Right arm offbreak

Domestic team information
- Years: Team
- 2015–16: Andhra Pradesh
- Source: ESPNcricinfo, 13 December 2015

Koripalli Sreekanth (born 23 November 1992) is an Indian cricketer who plays for Andhra Pradesh. He made his first-class debut on 7 November 2015 in the 2015–16 Ranji Trophy.

He has the role of Batsman, using a right-handed bat and his bowling style is right-arm offbreak.
