= Prayag Bhati =

Indian cricketer (born 1991)

Personal information
- Born: 24 September 1991 (age 35); Bombay, Maharashtra India
- Batting: Right-handed
- Bowling: Right-arm offbreak

Domestic team information
- Years: Team
- 2012/13: Maharashtra
- Source: ESPNcricinfo, 30 January 2017

Prayag Bhati (born 24 September 1991) is an Indian cricketer. He made his first-class debut for Maharashtra in the 2012–13 Ranji Trophy on 29 December 2012. He is a right-handed batsman and right-arm off-break bowler, Bhati has played for Maharashtra in Indian domestic competitions and currently represents teams in the Washington Cricket League.

== Career ==
His tenure with Maharashtra spanned from the 2012/13 to the 2017/18 seasons. During this period, he participated in various formats, including first-class, List A, and Twenty20 matches. In the 2016–17 Inter-State Twenty20 Tournament, Bhati was part of the Maharashtra squad, contributing to the team's performance in the West Zone matches.

He has played for Fairfax CC and Duronto Tigers CC in the Washington Cricket League and the Washington Metropolitan Cricket Board.

As of April 2025, he has played 71 matches on the CricHeroes platform, scoring over 2,500 runs and taking 27 wickets.

Throughout his career, Bhati has represented Mumbai Customs Cricket Club, Bandra Heroes, and Mumbai RSB Team.
