= Shakti Malviya =

Indian cricketer (born 1990)

Personal information
- Born: 27 October 1990 (age 36); Varanasi, Uttar Pradesh, India
- Source: ESPNcricinfo, 29 January 2017

Shakti Malviya (born 27 October 1990) is an Indian cricketer. He made his first-class debut for Services in the 2012–13 Ranji Trophy on 24 November 2012. He made his List A debut for Services in the 2016–17 Vijay Hazare Trophy on 25 February 2017.
