= Fabid Ahmed =

Indian cricketer

Personal information
- Full name: Fabid Farooque Ahmed
- Born: 27 July 1995 (age 31); Thalassery, Kannur, Kerala, India
- Batting: Right-handed
- Bowling: Right-arm offbreak
- Role: All-rounder

Domestic team information
- Years: Team
- 2014/15–2017/18: Kerala
- 2018/19–present: Pondicherry
- Source: ESPNcricinfo, 11 October 2017

Fabid Farooque Ahmed (born 27 July 1995) is an Indian cricketer who has represented Kerala and presently Pondicherry in domestic cricket. He is an all-rounder who bats right-handed and bowls right-arm off-spin.

== Early life ==
Fabid was born on 27 July 1995 in Thalassery in Kannur district of Kerala. He comes from the family of former Ranji players CTK Usman Kutty and CTK Masood. He is a resident of Mahe. He has an elder brother Fazil, also a cricketer.

== Domestic career ==
Fabid has represented India South Zone at U-19 level. He took 14 wickets in the C K Nayudu Trophy U-23 tournament in 2014. He has also captained many age-group Kerala teams.

He made his List A debut for Kerala on 8 November 2014 in the 2014-15 Vijay Hazare Trophy. He made his twenty 20 debut for Kerala on 27 March 2015 in the 2014-15 Syed Mushtaq Ali Trophy. He made his first-class on 8 October 2015 in the 2015-16 Ranji Trophy. In his second Ranji match against Goa, he scored a century batting at number 8, which was the fastest ton by a Kerala batsman. In August 2018, he was one of eight players that were fined by the Kerala Cricket Association, after showing dissent against Kerala's captain, Sachin Baby. He has played six first-class matches and 11 List-A games for Kerala.

He was one of the four Kerala cricketers among Nikhilesh Surendran, Iqlas Naha and Abdul Safar who shifted their allegiance to the newly found Puducherry cricket team ahead of the 2018-19 Indian domestic season.

He made his List A debut for Puducherry in the 2018–19 Vijay Hazare Trophy on 19 September 2018 against Manipur on Puducherry's first ever domestic match. He was also the vice-captain of the team. However, the next day, the Board of Control for Cricket in India (BCCI) facing protests from other state associations, revoked the special allowance granted to Puducherry which allowed to play players from outside the State the team is located in, after concerns were raised that no local cricketers had played in the match. Fabid was found matching BCCI's eligibility criteria which required the players to be either born in the state or be a resident for more than a year. He claimed a five-wicket haul against Sikkim in the same season conceding just 8 runs in 9.2 overs, recording the most economical bowling figure in a game in Indian List A cricket.

He was the leading wicket-taker for Puducherry in the 2018–19 Vijay Hazare Trophy, with eleven dismissals in five matches. He was named the man of the match in Puducherry's first ever Ranji trophy victory in which he played a pivotal role with his all-round efforts scoring a century and taking six wickets (2/22, 4/8) in the match.
