= Prakash Seet =

Indian cricketer (born 1991)

Personal information
- Born: 15 September 1991 (age 35); West Singhbhum, India
- Source: ESPNcricinfo, 29 January 2017

Prakash Seet (born 15 September 1991) is an Indian cricketer. He made his Twenty20 debut for Jharkhand in the 2012–13 Syed Mushtaq Ali Trophy on 18 March 2013.
