= Sahil Sharma =

Indian cricketer (born 1989)

Personal information
- Full name: Sahil Sudesh Sharma
- Born: 9 November 1989 (age 37); Jammu, India
- Source: ESPNcricinfo, 29 January 2017

Sahil Sharma (born 9 November 1989) is an Indian cricketer. He made his first-class debut for Jammu and Kashmir in the 2012–13 Ranji Trophy on 24 November 2012.
