= Joydeep Bhattacharjee =

Indian cricketer (born 1995)

Personal information
- Full name: Joydeep Bidhanchandra Bhattacharjee
- Born: 28 December 1995 (age 30); Agartala, Tripura, India
- Batting: Right-handed
- Bowling: Right arm offbreak
- Source: ESPNcricinfo, 29 January 2017

Joydeep Bhattacharjee (born 28 December 1995) is an Indian cricketer. He made his List A debut for Tripura in the 2015–16 Vijay Hazare Trophy on 13 December 2015. He made his Twenty20 debut for Tripura in the 2016–17 Inter State Twenty-20 Tournament on 31 January 2017. He made his first-class debut for Tripura in the 2017–18 Ranji Trophy on 14 October 2017.
