= Danny Dereck Prince =

Indian cricketer (born 1986)

Personal information
- Born: 14 March 1986 (age 40); Nizamabad, India

Domestic team information
- Years: Team
- 2007-2015: Hyderabad

Career statistics
Competition	FC	List A	T20
Matches	3	6	7
Runs scored	71	119	145
Batting average	17.75	19.83	20.71
100s/50s	0/1	0/0	0/0
Top score	62	32	33
Catches/stumpings	2/0	0/0	1/0
- Source: ESPNcricinfo, 23 June 2018

Danny Dereck Prince (born 14 March 1986) is an Indian cricketer. He plays for Hyderabad. He made his Ranji Trophy debut for Hyderabad in 2007. However, after poor scores in the first match, he was sidelined. He continued to play in local leagues. In 2015, he was selected again for Hyderabad.

== See also ==
- List of Hyderabad cricketers
