= Taranjit Singh =

Indian cricketer (born 1987)

Personal information
- Born: 28 March 1987 (age 39); Hyderabad, India
- Source: ESPNcricinfo, 30 January 2017

Taranjit Singh (born 28 March 1987) is an Indian cricketer. He made his Twenty20 debut for Maharashtra in the 2009–10 Syed Mushtaq Ali Trophy on 20 October 2009.
