= Matta Ravikumar =

Matta Ravi Kumar
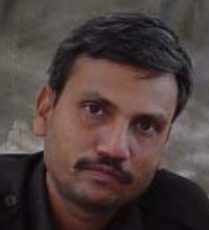
- Died: Pullalacheruvu, Andhra Pradesh
- Political party: Communist Party of India (Maoist)

Matta Ravikumar (died June 16, 2006) also known as Ravi Kumar, nom de guerre Sridhar or Anil, was a prominent leader of the Communist Party of India (Maoist) and a member of the Andhra Pradesh state committee of the party. Ravi Kumar had been associated with the revolutionary movement since 1968. In 2006, he was killed in an encounter with police forces. At the time, he was responsible for the squad operations of the party in the Krishna and Guntur districts.
