= Himalaya Barad =

Indian cricketer (born 1989)

Personal information
- Born: 28 August 1989 (age 37); Ahmedabad, India
- Source: ESPNcricinfo, 30 January 2017

Himalaya Barad (born 28 August 1989) is an Indian cricketer. He made his List A debut for Gujarat in the 2013–14 Vijay Hazare Trophy on 27 February 2014.
