= Divya Pratap Singh =

Indian cricketer (born 1992)

Personal information
- Born: 1 October 1992 (age 34); Rajasthan, India
- Batting: Right-handed
- Bowling: Right-arm medium

Domestic team information
- Years: Team
- 2013/14: Rajasthan
- Source: ESPNcricinfo, 29 January 2017

Divya Pratap Singh (born 1 October 1992) is an Indian cricketer. He made his List A debut for Rajasthan in the 2013–14 Vijay Hazare Trophy on 27 February 2014.
