= A I Harrsha =

Indian cricketer (born 1990)

Personal information
- Born: 8 December 1990 (age 35); Chennai, India
- Batting: Right-handed
- Bowling: Right-arm off break

Domestic team information
- Years: Team
- 2015-present: Hyderabad

Career statistics
Competition	FC
Matches	1
Runs scored	5
Batting average	–
100s/50s	0/0
Top score	5*
Balls bowled	222
Wickets	2
Bowling average	49.50
5 wickets in innings	0
10 wickets in match	0
Best bowling	2/99
Catches/stumpings	0/–
- Source: ESPNcricinfo, 5 July 2019

Asshok Iyengar Harrsha Vardhan (born 8 December 1990) is an Indian cricketer. He made his first-class debut for Hyderabad in the 2014–15 Ranji Trophy on 13 January 2015.
