= Sohraab Dhaliwal =

Indian cricketer (born 1991)

Personal information
- Born: 18 November 1991 (age 34); Ferozepur, Punjab, India
- Batting: Right-handed
- Bowling: Slow left-arm orthodox
- Role: Batsman

Domestic team information
- Years: Team
- 2014–: Madhya Pradesh
- Source: Cricinfo, 25 February 2016

Sohraab Dhaliwal (born 18 November 1991) is an Indian cricketer who plays for Madhya Pradesh. He made his List A debut on 2 March 2014, for Madhya Pradesh in the 2013–14 Vijay Hazare Trophy.

He made his Twenty20 debut against Vidarbha cricket team at Vidarbha Cricket Association Ground in April, 2014 where he scored 20 off 10 balls as well as 4 over 23 runs took wicket of Vidharba captain Shalabh Shrivastava.

He made his List A debut against Railways cricket team at KL Saini Ground in March, 2014 where he scored 7 off 13 balls as well as he bowled 3 over for 11 runs.

He also represented Jiwaji University in 2012/13 Rohinton Baria Trophy.
