= Arjit Gupta =

Indian cricketer (born 1989)

Personal information
- Full name: Arjit Ramesh Gupta
- Born: 12 September 1989 (age 37); Suratgarh, Rajasthan, India
- Batting: Right-handed
- Role: Batsman

Career statistics
| Competition | FC | LA |
|---|---|---|
| Matches | 8 | 7 |
| Runs scored | 383 | 225 |
| Batting average | 25.73 | 37.50 |
| 100s/50s | 0/2 | 1/1 |
| Top score | 77 | 107 |
| Balls bowled | – | – |
| Wickets | 0 | 0 |
| Bowling average | – | – |
| 5 wickets in innings | – | – |
| 10 wickets in match | – | – |
| Best bowling | –/– | –/– |
| Catches/stumpings | –/– | –/– |
- Source: ESPNcricinfo, 6 October 2015

Arjit Gupta (born 12 September 1989) is an Indian first-class cricketer who plays for Rajasthan.
