= Joseph Stalin (trade unionist) =

Sri Lankan trade unionist

- ජෝසප් ස්ටාලින්
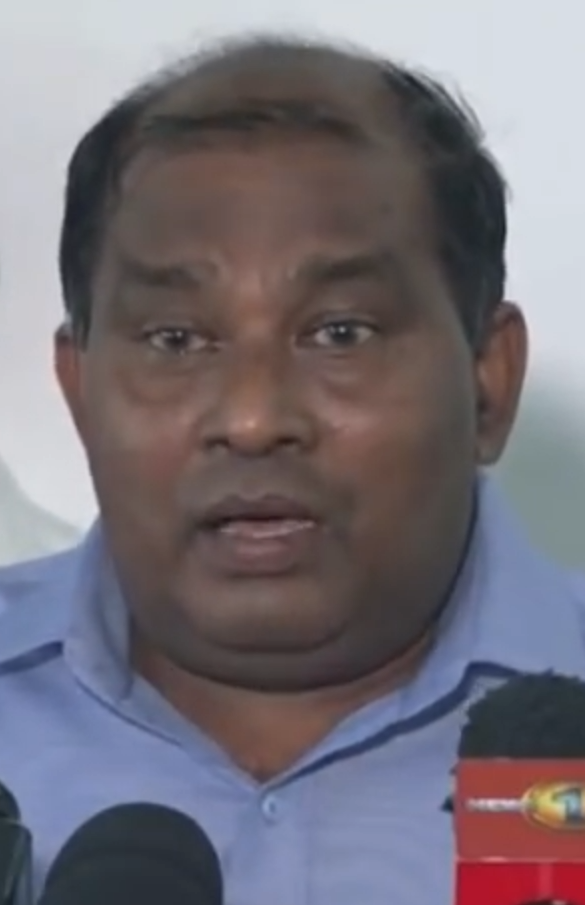
- Joseph Stalin in 2021
- Occupation: General Secretary of Ceylon Teachers' Union

Joseph Stalin (Sinhala: ජෝසප් ස්ටාලින්, Tamil: ஜோசப் ஸ்டாலின்) is a Sri Lankan trade unionist. As of 2022, he serves as general secretary of the Ceylon Teachers' Union. He has led campaigns against the militarisation of education in Sri Lanka, and has received media attention for his role in the 2022 Sri Lankan protests and subsequent arrest.

== Early life ==
Stalin was born in the 1960s, the son of an activist in the Ceylon Communist Party (Peking Wing). He was named after Soviet leader Joseph Stalin.

== CTU General Secretary ==
In 2020, he opposed moves by the Sri Lankan government to convert schools into COVID-19 isolation centres. Later that year, he spoke out against the creation of a Director General – Sports position in the Ministry of Education, saying that the government was "attempting to undermine the education system by appointing unqualified people to high posts."

In July 2021, he was arrested by police along with ten other demonstrators after protesting against the National Defence University Bill, a proposed law that human rights activists raised concerns would militarise universities in Sri Lanka. After two weeks of detention, he was released.

=== 2022 Sri Lankan protests ===
Under Stalin's leadership, the Ceylon Teachers’ Union played a significant role in the 2022 Sri Lankan protests, including the organisation of a general strike in early May 2022. On 25 July 2022, the Magistrate's Court Colombo imposed a travel ban on Stalin over his role in the protests. A week later, following a speech by new president Ranil Wickremesinghe that threatened to take legal action against "individuals who intentionally violate the law," Stalin's office was raided and he was placed under arrest. The arrest provoked significant controversy, including protests demanding his release and with United Nations Special Rapporteur on the situation of human rights defenders Mary Lawlor stating that the government was targeting critics and that Stalin "should not have been arrested." Sri Lankan Leader of the Opposition Sajith Premadasa stated that "Stalin was not involved in any violence" and "has been arrested for exercising his constitutional rights." At the time of his arrest, he was the most senior trade union leader to have been arrested as part of the government's crackdown against the protests. On 9 August, he was released on bail.
