= Rishi Arothe =

Indian cricketer (born 1995)

Personal information
- Full name: Rishi Tushar Arothe
- Born: 12 November 1995 (age 31); Vadodara, India
- Batting: Left-handed
- Bowling: Left arm medium
- Role: Bowler
- Relatives: Tushar Arothe (father)

Domestic team information
- Years: Team
- 2015: Baroda
- Source: Cricinfo, 2 November 2015

Rishi Arothe (born 12 November 1995) is an Indian cricketer who plays for Baroda. He made his first-class debut on 30 October in the 2015–16 Ranji Trophy. He made his List A debut on 10 December 2015 in the 2015–16 Vijay Hazare Trophy.
