= Urvesh Patel =

Indian cricketer (born 1988)

Personal information
- Born: 21 January 1988 (age 38); Maharashtra, India
- Source: ESPNcricinfo, 29 January 2017

Urvesh Patel (born 21 January 1988) is an Indian cricketer. He made his first-class debut for Vidarbha in the 2012–13 Ranji Trophy on 24 November 2012.
