= Akash Bhandari =

Indian cricketer (born 1993)

Personal information
- Full name: Akash Ashok Bhandari
- Born: 10 June 1993 (age 33); Hyderabad, India
- Batting: Right-handed
- Bowling: Leg break

Domestic team information
- Years: Team
- 2010-present: Hyderabad

Career statistics
Competition	FC	LA	T20
Matches	25	29	45
Runs scored	592	433	297
Batting average	19.09	18.82	11.42
100s/50s	0/3	0/1	0/0
Top score	71*	78	37*
Balls bowled	4,312	1,161	859
Wickets	69	24	38
Bowling average	33.14	41.75	25.55
5 wickets in innings	2	0	0
10 wickets in match	0	0	0
Best bowling	5/72	3/34	3/24
Catches/stumpings	9/–	5/–	21/–
- Source: ESPNcricinfo, 7 May 2020

Akash Bhandari (born 10 June 1993) is an Indian cricketer who plays for Hyderabad. In the 2016–17 Ranji Trophy match against Himachal Pradesh, he took four wickets for no runs, when Himachal Pradesh were bowled out in their first innings for 36.
