= Prathamesh Dake =

Indian cricketer (born 1991)

Personal information
- Born: 1 January 1991 (age 35); Maharashtra, India
- Source: ESPNcricinfo, 30 January 2017

Prathamesh Dake (born 1 January 1991) is an Indian cricketer. He made his Twenty20 debut for Mumbai in the 2013–14 Syed Mushtaq Ali Trophy on 30 March 2014.
