= Sanjay Majumder =

Indian cricketer (born 1987)

Personal information
- Born: 20 December 1987 (age 38); Gomati, India
- Batting: Right-handed
- Source: ESPNcricinfo, 30 November 2016

Sanjay Majumder (born 20 December 1987) is an Indian first-class cricketer who plays for Tripura. He made his first-class debut for Tripura in the 2012-13 Ranji Trophy on 1 December 2012.
