= Shamshuzama Kazi =

Indian cricketer (born 1994)

Personal information
- Full name: Shamshuzama Mujtaba Kazi
- Born: 10 November 1994 (age 32); Nanded, Maharashtra, India
- Source: ESPNcricinfo, 30 January 2017

Shamshuzama Kazi (born 10 November 1994) is an Indian cricketer. He made his List A debut for Maharashtra in the 2014–15 Vijay Hazare Trophy on 11 November 2014. He made his first-class debut for Maharashtra in the 2017–18 Ranji Trophy on 17 November 2017.
