= 2014–15 Syed Mushtaq Ali Trophy =

Indian cricket tournament

- Dates: 24 March 2015 – 7 April 2015
- Administrator(s): BCCI
- Cricket format: T20
- Tournament format(s): Round robin, then knockout
- Champions: Gujarat (2nd title)
- Participants: 27
- Matches: 81
- Most runs: Tirumalasetti Suman (Hyderabad) (361)
- Most wickets: Rohit Dahiya (Gujarat) (17); Chama Milind (Hyderabad) (17)

The 2014–15 Syed Mushtaq Ali Trophy was the seventh edition of the Syed Mushtaq Ali Trophy, an annual Twenty20 tournament in India. Played from 24 March to 7 April 2015, it was contested by all 27 Ranji Trophy teams. Gujarat won the championship, earning their second title.

== Format ==
The teams were divided into five zonal groups: Central, East, North, South and West. All group stage matches were held at a single host city within that zone: Indore (Central), Cuttack (East), Delhi (North), Kochi (South) and Pune (West).

== Group stage ==
=== Central Zone ===
Teams	M	W	L	D/NR	Pts	NRR
Madhya Pradesh	4	3	1	0	12	+1.086
Rajasthan	4	3	1	0	12	+0.545
Railways	4	2	2	0	8	+0.415
Uttar Pradesh	4	1	3	0	4	–0.257
Vidarbha	4	1	3	0	4	–1.713

=== East Zone ===
Teams	M	W	L	D/NR	Pts	NRR
Odisha	4	3	1	0	12	+2.025
Jharkhand	4	3	1	0	12	–0.392
Bengal	4	2	2	0	8	+0.328
Tripura	4	1	3	0	4	–0.984
Assam	4	1	3	0	4	–1.203

=== North Zone ===
Teams	M	W	L	D/NR	Pts	NRR
Punjab	5	4	1	0	16	+2.475
Himachal Pradesh	5	4	1	0	16	+0.334
Delhi	5	3	2	0	12	+0.126
Services	5	2	3	0	8	–0.205
Haryana	5	2	3	0	8	-0.675
Jammu and Kashmir	5	0	5	0	0	–1.962

=== South Zone ===
Teams	M	W	L	D/NR	Pts	NRR
Andhra	5	4	1	0	16	+0.212
Hyderabad	5	3	2	0	12	+0.943
Karnataka	5	3	2	0	12	+0.655
Tamil Nadu	5	3	2	0	12	–0.416
Kerala	5	2	3	0	8	+0.374
Goa	5	0	5	0	0	–1.928

=== West Zone ===
Teams	M	W	L	D/NR	Pts	NRR
Mumbai	4	3	1	0	12	+0.525
Gujarat	4	3	1	0	12	–0.436
Saurashtra	4	2	2	0	8	+0.374
Baroda	4	1	2	1	6	+0.199
Maharashtra	4	0	3	1	2	–0.864

- Qualified for Super League

== Super league stage ==
=== Group A ===
Teams	M	W	L	NR	Pts	NRR
Gujarat	4	4	0	0	16	+1.312
Madhya Pradesh	4	2	2	0	8	+1.140
Himachal Pradesh	4	2	2	0	8	–0.017
Andhra	4	2	2	0	8	–1.109
Jharkhand	4	0	4	0	0	–1.357

=== Group B ===
Teams	M	W	L	NR	Pts	NRR
Punjab	4	3	1	0	12	+0.345
Mumbai	4	2	2	0	8	+0.571
Rajasthan	4	2	2	0	8	+0.450
Odisha	4	2	2	0	8	+0.334
Hyderabad	4	1	3	0	4	–1.465

== Final ==
7 April 2015
Scorecard

Punjab; 117/9 (20 overs)	v	Gujarat; 123/8 (19.5 overs)
Ravi Inder Singh 30 (41); Rohit Dahiya 4/15 (4 overs)		Smit Patel 50* (49); Taruwar Kohli 2/20 (2.5 overs)

Gujarat won by 2 wickets
KIIT Stadium, Bhubaneswar
Umpires: Ulhas Gandhe (Ind) and Jayaraman Madanagopal (Ind)

- Gujarat won the toss and elected to field.
