= CV Stephen =

Indian cricketer (born 1993)

Personal information
- Full name: Cheepurapalli Veeraghavulu Stephen
- Born: 3 December 1993 (age 32); East Godavari, Andhra Pradesh, India
- Batting: Left-handed
- Bowling: Left-arm medium-fast
- Role: Bowler

Domestic team information
- Years: Team
- 2013–present: Andhra

Career statistics
Competition	FC	List A	T20
Matches	11	5	8
Runs scored	23	3	5
Batting average	3.28	–	–
100s/50s	0/0	0/0	0/0
Top score	8	3*	5*
Balls bowled	1,919	276	162
Wickets	39	11	10
Bowling average	24.87	18.81	16.50
5 wickets in innings	1	0	0
10 wickets in match	0	0	0
Best bowling	6/32	4/46	2/14
Catches/stumpings	3/–	1/–	2/–
- Source: ESPNcricinfo, 4 April 2015

Cheepurapalli Veeraghavulu Stephen (born 3 December 1993) is an Indian cricketer who plays for Andhra cricket team. He is a left-arm medium-fast bowler, who played for Andhra Under-16s and Andhra Under-19s before making his debut for Andhra. He was selected in the South Zone squad for the 2014–15 Deodhar Trophy.
