= Jesal Karia =

Indian cricketer (born 1989)

Personal information
- Born: 7 November 1989 (age 37); Petlad, Gujarat, India
- Source: ESPNcricinfo, 30 January 2017

Jesal Karia (born 7 November 1989) is an Indian cricketer. He made his first-class debut for Gujarat in the 2011–12 Ranji Trophy on 10 November 2011.
