= Ravikumar Thakur =

Indian cricketer (born 1984)

Personal information
- Born: 1 September 1984 (age 42); Akola, India
- Source: Cricinfo, 6 October 2015

Ravikumar Thakur (born 1 September 1984) is an Indian first-class cricketer who plays for Vidarbha.
