= 2020–21 Hyderabad C.A. season =

Hyderabad C.A.
2020–21 season
- Coach: Anirudh Singh
- Captain: Tanmay Agarwal
- Ground(s): Rajiv Gandhi International Cricket Stadium
- Syed Mushtaq Ali Trophy: 5th Group B
- Vijay Hazare Trophy: 3rd Group A
- Most runs: LA: Tanmay Agarwal (446); T20: Bavanaka Sandeep (121)
- Most wickets: LA: Ravi Teja (12); T20: Ravi Teja (7)

The 2020–21 season is Hyderabad cricket team's 87th competitive season. The Hyderabad cricket team is senior men's domestic cricket team based in the city of Hyderabad, India, run by the Hyderabad Cricket Association (HCA). They represent the state of Telangana in domestic competitions.

== Squad ==
=== Arrivals ===
Balchander Anirudh got selected to the Hyderabad squad for the first time since his departure to Tamil Nadu in 2017.

=== Departures ===
Ambati Rayudu left Hyderabad for the second time in his career to join Andhra despite captaining the side last season. He criticized the previous coach, Arjun Yadav for poor performance of the team during last season while citing politics in the team as the reason for his switch. He played for Hyderabad over ten seasons and also represented India in 55 One Day Internationals and 17 T20 Internationals. Left arm spinner Lalith Mohan opted for Andhra this season after he was overlooked by selectors over last few years. He last played for Hyderabad in 2015.

=== Players ===
The following players made at least one appearance for Hyderabad in first-class, List A or Twenty20 cricket in 2020–21 season. Age given is at the start of Hyderabad's first match of the season (10 January 2021).
Players with international caps are listed in bold.

Name	Birth date	Batting style	Bowling style	Notes
Batsmen
Himalay Agarwal	9 October 1993 (aged 27)	Right-handed	Right-arm medium-fast	
Tanmay Agarwal	3 May 1995 (aged 25)	Left-handed	Right-arm leg break	**Captain**
Jaweed Ali	15 December 1993 (aged 27)	Right-handed	Right-arm off break	
Balchander Anirudh	2 September 1994 (aged 26)	Left-handed	Right-arm off break	
Rahul Buddhi	20 September 1997 (aged 23)	Left-handed	Right-arm off break	**Twenty20** debut against Assam (10 January 2021)
Muthyala Charan	3 December 1999 (aged 21)	Right-handed	—	
Abhirath Reddy	29 September 1996 (aged 24)	Right-handed	Right-arm leg break	
Satwik Reddy	12 January 2002 (aged 18)	Right-handed	—	**List A** debut against Goa (28 February 2021)
Shreyas Vala	20 February 1997 (aged 23)	Right-handed	Right-arm medium-fast	
Tilak Varma	8 November 2002 (aged 18)	Left-handed	Right-arm off break	
Rakesh Yadav	4 September 1999 (aged 21)	Right-handed	—	
All-rounders
Mickil Jaiswal	10 May 1998 (aged 22)	Right-handed	Right-arm leg break	**Twenty20** debut against Odisha (12 January 2021); **List A** debut against Tripura (20 February 2021)
Bavanaka Sandeep	25 April 1992 (aged 28)	Left-handed	Slow left-arm orthodox	
Ravi Teja	19 October 1994 (aged 26)	Left-handed	Right-arm medium-fast	
Tanay Thyagarajan	15 November 1995 (aged 25)	Left-handed	Slow left-arm orthodox	
Wicket-keepers
Yash Gupta	1 December 1997 (aged 23)	Right-handed	—	**List A** debut against Goa (28 February 2021)
Jamalpur Mallikarjun	14 October 1993 (aged 27)	Right-handed	—	
Pragnay Reddy	18 December 1999 (aged 21)	Right-handed	—	**Twenty20** debut against Odisha (12 January 2021)
Prateek Reddy	28 November 2000 (aged 20)	Right-handed	—	**List A** debut against Tripura (20 February 2021)
Kolla Sumanth	24 April 1992 (aged 28)	Right-handed	—	
Bowlers
Ajay Dev Goud	15 February 2000 (aged 20)	Right-handed	Right-arm medium-fast	
Mehdi Hasan	3 February 1990 (aged 30)	Left-handed	Slow left-arm orthodox	
Kartikeya Kak	4 October 1996 (aged 24)	Right-handed	Right-arm medium-fast	**Twenty20** debut against Assam (10 January 2021)
Chama Milind	4 September 1994 (aged 26)	Left-handed	Left-arm medium-fast	
Abdul Ela Al Quraishi	2 December 1997 (aged 23)	Left-handed	Right-arm off break	
Rakshann Readdi	29 September 2000 (aged 20)	Right-handed	Right-arm medium-fast	**Twenty20** debut against Tamil Nadu (16 January 2021); **List A** debut against Gujarat (26 February 2021)
Akhilesh Reddy	28 April 2000 (aged 20)	Right-handed	Right-arm off break	
Yudhvir Singh	13 September 1997 (aged 23)	Right-handed	Right-arm medium-fast	Played for **Mumbai Indians** in 2021 Indian Premier League
**Mohammed Siraj**	13 March 1994 (aged 26)	Right-handed	Right-arm medium-fast	Played for **Royal Challengers Bangalore** in 2021 Indian Premier League
Ashish Srivastav	9 July 2000 (aged 20)	Right-handed	Right-arm leg break	
Bhagath Varma	21 September 1998 (aged 22)	Right-handed	Right-arm off break	Played for **Chennai Super Kings** in 2021 Indian Premier League
Hitesh Yadav	6 September 1999 (aged 21)	Left-handed	Slow left-arm orthodox	**Twenty20** debut against Tamil Nadu (16 January 2021)

== Competitions ==
=== Overview ===
Competition	Format	Pld	W	L	D / T / NR	Win %	Final position
Syed Mushtaq Ali Trophy	Twenty20 cricket	5	1	4	0	20%	Group stage
Vijay Hazare Trophy	List A cricket	5	3	2	0	60%	Group stage

=== Syed Mushtaq Ali Trophy ===
The Syed Mushtaq Ali Trophy, a Twenty20 cricket tournament in India, fixtures were announced by the Board of Control for Cricket in India (BCCI) on 17 December 2020 and the Hyderabad was placed in the Group B with all the group fixtures to be played in a bio-secure hub in Kolkata. Anirudh Singh was appointed as an interim coach for the Hyderabad on 21 December with Zakir Hussain as an assistant coach and Shashank Nag as the fielding coach.

The Hyderabad started their campaign with a loss against the Assam. They won their second match against the Odisha. The losses in their next three matches meant that the Hyderabad failed to qualify for the knockout stage as they finished fifth in the group with one win.

==== Points table ====
Team	Pld	W	L	T	NR	Pts	NRR
Tamil Nadu (Q)	5	5	0	0	0	20	+1.88
Bengal	5	3	2	0	0	12	+0.654
Jharkhand	5	3	2	0	0	12	+0.23
Assam	5	2	3	0	0	8	-0.961
Hyderabad	5	1	4	0	0	4	–0.199
Odisha	5	1	4	0	0	4	–1.569

- Top team advanced to the Knockout Stage

==== Matches ====
Group stage

10 January 2021	Assam; 159/5 (20 overs)	v	Hyderabad; 157/8 (20 overs)	Assam won by 2 runs
19:00 (D/N) Round 1 Scorecard	Assam; 159/5 (20 overs)	v	Hyderabad; 157/8 (20 overs)	Eden Gardens, Kolkata; Umpires: Navdeep Singh and Ulhas Gandhe
19:00 (D/N) Round 1 Scorecard	Riyan Parag 51* (40); Kartikeya Kak 3/42 (4 overs)		Himalay Agarwal 29 (22); Pritam Das 3/30 (4 overs)	Eden Gardens, Kolkata; Umpires: Navdeep Singh and Ulhas Gandhe
Hyderabad won the toss and elected to field.; Abhishek Thakuri, Amlanjyoti Das, Denish Das, Rahul Singh (Assam), Kartikeya Kak and Rahul Buddhi (Hyderabad) all made their T20 debuts.				Eden Gardens, Kolkata; Umpires: Navdeep Singh and Ulhas Gandhe

12 January 2021	Hyderabad; 153/8 (20 overs)	v	Odisha; 147/4 (20 overs)	Hyderabad won by 6 runs
12:00 Round 2 Scorecard	Hyderabad; 153/8 (20 overs)	v	Odisha; 147/4 (20 overs)	Jadavpur University, Kolkata; Umpires: Anil Dandekar and Puttarangaiah Jayapal
12:00 Round 2 Scorecard	Tilak Varma 44 (35); Suryakant Pradhan3/34 (4 overs)		Govinda Poddar 50 (33); Chama Milind 2/24 (4 overs)	Jadavpur University, Kolkata; Umpires: Anil Dandekar and Puttarangaiah Jayapal
Odisha won the toss and elected to field.; Ankitkar Jaiswal (Odisha), Mickil Jaiswal and Pragnay Reddy (Hyderabad) all made their T20 debuts.				Jadavpur University, Kolkata; Umpires: Anil Dandekar and Puttarangaiah Jayapal

14 January 2021	Hyderabad; 157 (20 overs)	v	Bengal; 161/4 (18.2 overs)	Bengal won by 6 wickets
19:00 (D/N) Round 3 Scorecard	Hyderabad; 157 (20 overs)	v	Bengal; 161/4 (18.2 overs)	Eden Gardens, Kolkata; Umpires: Navdeep Singh and Ulhas Gandhe
19:00 (D/N) Round 3 Scorecard	Tilak Varma 50 (30); Ishan Porel 4/24 (4 overs)		Shreevats Goswami 69* (48); Ravi Teja 2/28 (4 overs)	Eden Gardens, Kolkata; Umpires: Navdeep Singh and Ulhas Gandhe
Bengal won the toss and elected to field.				Eden Gardens, Kolkata; Umpires: Navdeep Singh and Ulhas Gandhe

16 January 2021	Hyderabad; 152/7 (20 overs)	v	Tamil Nadu; 155/3 (19.3 overs)	Tamil Nadu won by 7 wickets
12:00 Round 4 Scorecard	Hyderabad; 152/7 (20 overs)	v	Tamil Nadu; 155/3 (19.3 overs)	Jadavpur University, Kolkata; Umpires: Anil Dandekar and Puttarangaiah Jayapal
12:00 Round 4 Scorecard	Bavanaka Sandeep 41 (36); Baba Aparajith 2/34 (4 overs)		Narayan Jagadeesan 78* (51); Ravi Teja 1/21 (4 overs)	Jadavpur University, Kolkata; Umpires: Anil Dandekar and Puttarangaiah Jayapal
Hyderabad won the toss and elected to bat.; Hitesh Yadav and Rakshann Readdi (Hyderabad) both made their T20 debuts.				Jadavpur University, Kolkata; Umpires: Anil Dandekar and Puttarangaiah Jayapal

18 January 2021	Hyderabad; 139/8 (20 overs)	v	Jharkhand; 139/9 (20 overs)	Match tied. Jharkhand won the Super Over
12:00 Round 5 Scorecard	Hyderabad; 139/8 (20 overs)	v	Jharkhand; 139/9 (20 overs)	Kolkata; Umpires: Bharati Vij and C. K. Nandan
12:00 Round 5 Scorecard	Bavanaka Sandeep 37 (34); Vivekanand Tiwari 3/25 (4 overs)		Utkarsh Singh 29 (26); Ajay Dev Goud 4/22 (4 overs)	Kolkata; Umpires: Bharati Vij and C. K. Nandan
Jharkhand won the toss and elected to field.; Super Over: Jharkhand 23/0 (1 over), Hyderabad 14/1 (1 over)				Kolkata; Umpires: Bharati Vij and C. K. Nandan

=== Ranji Trophy ===
Owing to the pandemic and curtailed domestic cricket season, the BCCI cancelled the 2020–21 Ranji Trophy season, but gave the go-ahead for this season's Vijay Hazare Trophy to take place.

=== Vijay Hazare Trophy ===
The Vijay Hazare Trophy, a List A cricket tournament in India, fixtures were announced by the Board of Control for Cricket in India (BCCI) on 6 February 2021 and the Hyderabad was placed in the Group A with all the group fixtures to be played in a bio-secure hub in Surat.

==== Points table ====
Team	Pld	W	L	T	NR	Pts	NRR
Gujarat (Q)	5	5	0	0	0	20	+1.278
Baroda	5	4	1	0	0	16	+0.399
Hyderabad	5	3	2	0	0	12	+0.186
Chhattisgarh	5	2	3	0	0	8	+0.069
Goa	5	1	4	0	0	4	–0.778
Tripura	5	0	5	0	0	0	–1.198

- Top team advanced to the Knockout Stage

==== Matches ====
Group stage

19 February 2021	Hyderabad; 349/5 (50 overs)	v	Tripura; 236 (42 overs)	Hyderabad won by 113 runs
09:00 Round 1 Scorecard	Hyderabad; 349/5 (50 overs)	v	Tripura; 236 (42 overs)	Pithwala Stadium, Surat; Umpires: Saidarshan Kumar and Somnath Jha
09:00 Round 1 Scorecard	Tilak Varma 156* (145); Rajat Dey 2/45 (6 overs)		Milind Kumar 67 (63); Chama Milind 5/43 (8 overs)	Pithwala Stadium, Surat; Umpires: Saidarshan Kumar and Somnath Jha
Tripura won the toss and elected to field.; Arjun Debnath, Dipayan Debbarma, Sankar Paul, Swarab Sahani (Tripura), Mickil Jaiswal and Prateek Reddy (Hyderabad) all made their List-A debuts.				Pithwala Stadium, Surat; Umpires: Saidarshan Kumar and Somnath Jha

22 February 2021	Chhattisgarh; 242/7 (50 overs)	v	Hyderabad; 243/3 (40.4 overs)	Hyderabad won by 7 wickets
09:00 Round 2 Scorecard	Chhattisgarh; 242/7 (50 overs)	v	Hyderabad; 243/3 (40.4 overs)	Pithwala Stadium, Surat; Umpires: Akshay Totre and Rajeev Godara
09:00 Round 2 Scorecard	Harpreet Singh 63 (99); Mehdi Hasan 3/32 (10 overs)		Tanmay Agarwal 122 (116); Jiwanjot Singh 1/2 (0.4 overs)	Pithwala Stadium, Surat; Umpires: Akshay Totre and Rajeev Godara
Chhattisgarh won the toss and elected to bat.				Pithwala Stadium, Surat; Umpires: Akshay Totre and Rajeev Godara

24 February 2021	Baroda; 316/7 (50 overs)	v	Hyderabad; 206 (42.2 overs)	Baroda won by 110 runs
09:00 Round 3 Scorecard	Baroda; 316/7 (50 overs)	v	Hyderabad; 206 (42.2 overs)	Lalabhai Contractor Stadium, Surat; Umpires: Chirra Ravikanthreddy and Rajesj Timaney
09:00 Round 3 Scorecard	Kedar Devdhar 131 (139); Ajay Dev Goud 2/68 (10 overs)		Tilak Varma 47 (46); Babashafi Pathan 3/37 (10 overs)	Lalabhai Contractor Stadium, Surat; Umpires: Chirra Ravikanthreddy and Rajesj Timaney
Hyderabad won the toss and elected to field.				Lalabhai Contractor Stadium, Surat; Umpires: Chirra Ravikanthreddy and Rajesj Timaney

26 February 2021	Gujarat; 222/9 (50 overs)	v	Hyderabad; 210 (48 overs)	Gujarat won by 12 runs
09:00 Round 4 Scorecard	Gujarat; 222/9 (50 overs)	v	Hyderabad; 210 (48 overs)	Kholvad Gymkhana Ground, Kamrej; Umpires: Akshay Totre and Rajeev Godara
09:00 Round 4 Scorecard	Karan Patel 78 (65); Ravi Teja 4/45 (10 overs)		Bavanaka Sandeep 54 (42); Arzan Nagwaswalla 3/36 (9 overs)	Kholvad Gymkhana Ground, Kamrej; Umpires: Akshay Totre and Rajeev Godara
Hyderabad won the toss and elected to field.; Rakshann Readdi (Hyderabad) made his List-A debut.				Kholvad Gymkhana Ground, Kamrej; Umpires: Akshay Totre and Rajeev Godara

28 February 2021	Hyderabad; 345/6 (50 overs)	v	Goa; 343/5 (50 overs)	Hyderabad won by 2 runs
09:00 Round 5 Scorecard	Hyderabad; 345/6 (50 overs)	v	Goa; 343/5 (50 overs)	Pithwala Stadium, Surat; Umpires: Saidarshan Kumar and Somnath Jha
09:00 Round 5 Scorecard	Tanmay Agarwal 150 (131); Lakshay Garg 2/60 (10 overs)		Eknath Kerkar 169* (143); Ravi Teja 3/69 (10 overs)	Pithwala Stadium, Surat; Umpires: Saidarshan Kumar and Somnath Jha
Goa won the toss and elected to field.; Satwik Reddy and Yash Gupta (Hyderabad) both made their List-A debuts.				Pithwala Stadium, Surat; Umpires: Saidarshan Kumar and Somnath Jha

== Player statistics ==
=== Batting and Fielding ===
Player	List A									Twenty20									
Player	Matches	Innings	Runs	Highest score	Average	100s	50s	Catches	Stumpings	Matches	Innings	Runs	Highest score	Average	Strike rate	100s	50s	Catches	Stumpings
Batsmen
Himalay Agarwal	5	5	147	49	36.75	0	0	1	–	5	5	108	29	21.60	105.88	0	0	1	–
Tanmay Agarwal	5	5	446	150	89.20	2	2	5	–	5	5	88	34	17.60	96.70	0	0	3	–
Balchander Anirudh	1	1	0	0	0.00	0	0	0	–										
Rahul Buddhi										5	5	91	26	22.75	131.88	0	0	0	–
Mickil Jaiswal	4	4	20	8	6.66	0	0	2	–	1	1	2	2*	–	200.00	0	0	0	–
Satwik Reddy	1	1	19	19*	–	0	0	0	–										
Tilak Varma	5	5	391	156*	97.75	2	1	3	–	5	5	116	50	23.20	127.47	0	1	1	–
All-rounders
Bavanaka Sandeep	5	5	124	54	31.00	0	1	3	–	5	5	121	41	24.20	114.15	0	0	4	–
Ravi Teja	5	4	39	19	9.75	0	0	1	–	5	5	45	24	9.00	128.57	0	0	1	–
Tanay Thyagarajan	5	4	41	28	13.66	0	0	1	–	5	5	45	21*	15.00	173.07	0	0	2	–
Wicket-keepers
Yash Gupta	1	–	–	–	–	–	–	0	0										
Pragnay Reddy										4	4	32	30	8.00	91.42	0	0	1	1
Prateek Reddy	4	2	45	38	22.50	0	0	7	2										
Kolla Sumanth										1	1	17	17	17.00	130.76	0	0	1	1
Bowlers
Ajay Dev Goud	3	1	7	7	7.00	0	0	2	–	1	1	0	0*	–	–	0	0	0	–
Mehdi Hasan	5	2	9	9	4.50	0	0	0	–										
Kartikeya Kak										2	1	0	0*	–	–	0	0	0	–
Chama Milind	4	2	29	21*	–	0	0	1	–	5	4	46	24*	46.00	219.04	0	0	2	–
Rakshann Readdi	2	1	0	0	0.00	0	0	0	–	2	–	–	–	–	–	–	–	0	–
Yudhvir Singh										3	3	17	10	5.66	154.54	0	0	0	–
Hitesh Yadav										1	–	–	–	–	–	–	–	0	–
Source: ESPNcricinfo

=== Bowling ===
Player	List A							Twenty20						
Player	Matches	Overs	Wickets	Average	Economy	BBI	5wi	Matches	Overs	Wickets	Average	Economy	BBI	4wi
Rahul Buddhi								5	0.2	0	–	12.00	–	0
Ajay Dev Goud	3	26.0	4	35.00	5.38	2/68	0	1	4.0	4	5.50	5.50	4/22	1
Mehdi Hasan	5	48.0	5	39.80	4.14	3/32	0							
Mickil Jaiswal								1	2.0	0	–	4.50	–	0
Kartikeya Kak								2	7.0	4	18.50	10.57	3/42	0
Chama Milind	4	38.0	10	21.30	5.60	5/43	1	5	18.0	3	56.66	9.44	2/24	0
Rakshann Readdi	2	20.0	1	134.00	6.70	1/56	0	2	6.0	1	47.00	7.83	1/15	0
Bavanaka Sandeep	5	21.0	3	45.00	6.42	2/37	0	5	9.3	1	58.00	6.10	1/8	0
Yudhvir Singh								3	10.0	1	82.00	8.20	1/27	0
Ravi Teja	5	46.0	12	24.91	6.50	4/45	0	5	19.0	7	19.85	7.31	2/26	0
Tanay Thyagarajan	5	43.0	2	108.00	5.02	1/36	0	5	16.0	1	92.00	5.75	1/19	0
Tilak Varma								5	3.0	0	–	9.33	–	0
Hitesh Yadav								1	3.0	0	–	7.00	–	0
Source: ESPNcricinfo
