= 2020–21 Vijay Hazare Trophy Group A =

Cricket tournament

- Dates: 20 – 28 February 2021
- Administrator(s): BCCI
- Cricket format: List A cricket
- Tournament format(s): Round-robin
- Participants: 6

The 2020–21 Vijay Hazare Trophy was the 19th season of the Vijay Hazare Trophy, a List A cricket tournament in India. It was contested by 38 teams, divided into six groups, with six teams in Group A. Baroda, Chhattisgarh, Goa, Gujarat, Hyderabad and Tripura were placed in Group A, with all the matches taking place in Surat. Gujarat won Group A to qualify for the knockout stage of the tournament.

== Points table ==
Team	Pld	W	L	T	NR	Pts	NRR
Gujarat (Q)	5	5	0	0	0	20	+1.278
Baroda	5	4	1	0	0	16	+0.399
Hyderabad	5	3	2	0	0	12	+0.186
Chhattisgarh	5	2	3	0	0	8	+0.069
Goa	5	1	4	0	0	4	–0.778
Tripura	5	0	5	0	0	0	–1.198

- Top team advanced to the Knockout Stage

== Fixtures ==
=== Round 1 ===
20 February 2021
Scorecard

Chhattisgarh; 231 (48.5 overs)	v	Gujarat; 232/7 (48.1 overs)
Shashank Chandrakar 92 (107); Arzan Nagwaswalla 6/54 (9.5 overs)		Dhruv Raval 38 (48); Veer Pratap Singh 2/38 (9 overs)

Gujarat won by 3 wickets
Lalabhai Contractor Stadium, Surat
Umpires: Prahlad Rawat and Sundaram Ravi

- Chhattisgarh won the toss and elected to bat.
- Sourabh Majumdar (Chhattisgarh) made his List A debut.

20 February 2021
Scorecard

Hyderabad; 349/5 (50 overs)	v	Tripura; 236 (42 overs)
Tilak Varma 156* (145); Rajat Dey 2/45 (6 overs)		Milind Kumar 67 (63); Chama Milind 5/43 (8 overs)

Hyderabad won by 113 runs
Pithwala Stadium, Surat
Umpires: Saidharshan Kumar and Somnath Jha

- Tripura won the toss and elected to field.
- Arjun Debnath, Dipayan Debbarma, Sankar Paul, Swarab Sahani (Tripura), Mickil Jaiswal and Prateek Reddy (Hyderabad) all made their List A debuts.

20 February 2021
Scorecard

Goa; 263 (49.1 overs)	v	Baroda; 264/5 (48.3 overs)
Snehal Kauthankar 81 (100); Krunal Pandya 3/62 (10 overs)		Vishnu Solanki 108 (132); Amit Verma 2/39 (10 overs)

Baroda won by 5 wickets
Kholvad Gymkhana Ground, Kamrej
Umpires: Akshay Totre and Rajeev Godara

- Baroda won the toss and elected to field.
- Dhruv Patel, Kartik Kakade (Baroda), Eknath Kerkar and Ishaan Gadekar (Goa) all made their List A debuts.

=== Round 2 ===
22 February 2021
Scorecard

Goa; 159 (45.4 overs)	v	Gujarat; 162/2 (27.4 overs)
Darshan Misal 44 (67); Hardik Patel 3/34 (10 overs)		Bhargav Merai 57 (55); Deepraj Gaonkar 1/26 (5 overs)

Gujarat won by 8 wickets
Lalabhai Contractor Stadium, Surat
Umpires: Prahlad Rawat and Sundaram Ravi

- Goa won the toss and elected to bat.

22 February 2021
Scorecard

Tripura; 302/7 (50 overs)	v	Baroda; 303/4 (49 overs)
Udiyan Bose 56 (50); Ninad Rathva 2/37 (10 overs)		Krunal Pandya 127* (97); Pratyush Singh 1/19 (2 overs)

Baroda won by 6 wickets
Kholvad Gymkhana Ground, Kamrej
Umpires: Saidharshan Kumar and Somnath Jha

- Baroda won the toss and elected to field.
- Pradeep Yadav (Baroda) made his List A debut.

22 February 2021
Scorecard

Chhattisgarh; 242/7 (50 overs)	v	Hyderabad; 243/2 (40.4 overs)
Harpreet Singh 63 (99); Mehdi Hasan 3/32 (10 overs)		Tanmay Agarwal 122* (116); Ashutosh Singh 1/31 (3 overs)

Hyderabad won by 8 wickets
Pithwala Stadium, Surat
Umpires: Akshay Totre and Rajeev Godara

- Chhattisgarh won the toss and elected to bat.

=== Round 3 ===
24 February 2021
Scorecard

Baroda; 316/7 (50 overs)	v	Hyderabad; 206 (42.2 overs)
Kedar Devdhar 131 (139); Ajay Dev Goud 2/68 (10 overs)		Tilak Varma 47 (46); Babashafi Pathan 3/37 (10 overs)

Baroda won by 110 runs
Lalabhai Contractor Stadium, Surat
Umpires: Chirra Ravikanthreddy and Rajesh Timaney

- Hyderabad won the toss and elected to field.

24 February 2021
Scorecard

Gujarat; 336/7 (50 overs)	v	Tripura; 204 (43.3 overs)
Het Patel 114 (99); Rana Dutta 5/74 (10 overs)		Udiyan Bose 65 (77); Hardik Patel 3/25 (9.2 overs)

Gujarat won by 132 runs
Pithwala Stadium, Surat
Umpires: Akshay Totre and Rajeev Godara

- Tripura won the toss and elected to field.
- Amit Ali and Parvez Sultan (Tripura) both made their List A debuts.

24 February 2021
Scorecard

Goa; 210 (49.2 overs)	v	Chhattisgarh; 213/2 (36.5 overs)
Darshan Misal 56 (54); Veer Pratap Singh 4/29 (10 overs)		Rishabh Tiwari 91* (106); Amit Verma 2/34 (7.5 overs)

Chhattisgarh won by 8 wickets
Kholvad Gymkhana Ground, Kamrej
Umpires: Prahlad Rawat and Sundaram Ravi

- Chhattisgarh won the toss and elected to field.

=== Round 4 ===
26 February 2021
Scorecard

Tripura; 216 (50 overs)	v	Goa; 217/7 (45.3 overs)
Milind Kumar 68 (89); Lakshay Garg 5/42 (8 overs)		Eknath Kerkar 92 (126); Manisankar Murasingh 2/36 (9 overs)

Goa won by 3 wickets
Lalabhai Contractor Stadium, Surat
Umpires: Saidharshan Kumar and Somnath Jha

- Goa won the toss and elected to field.

26 February 2021
Scorecard

Baroda; 332/6 (50 overs)	v	Chhattisgarh; 319/9 (50 overs)
Krunal Pandya 133* (100); Shashank Singh 2/28 (6 overs)		Amandeep Khare 67 (77); Babashafi Pathan 3/73 (9 overs)

Baroda won by 13 runs
Pithwala Stadium, Surat
Umpires: Chirra Ravikanthreddy and Rajesh Timaney

- Baroda won the toss and elected to bat.

26 February 2021
Scorecard

Gujarat; 222/9 (50 overs)	v	Hyderabad; 210 (48 overs)
Karan Patel 78 (85); Ravi Teja 4/45 (10 overs)		Bavanaka Sandeep 54 (42); Arzan Nagwaswalla 3/36 (9 overs)

Gujarat won by 12 runs
Kholvad Gymkhana Ground, Kamrej
Umpires: Akshay Totre and Rajeev Godara

- Hyderabad won the toss and elected to field.
- Rakshann Readdi (Hyderabad) made his List A debut.

=== Round 5 ===
28 February 2021
Scorecard

Gujarat; 277/7 (50 overs)	v	Baroda; 237/9 (50 overs)
Dhruv Raval 102* (129); Atit Sheth 3/53 (10 overs)		Smit Patel 73 (113); Piyush Chawla 3/52 (10 overs)

Gujarat won by 40 runs
Lalabhai Contractor Stadium, Surat
Umpires: Prahlad Rawat and Sundaram Ravi

- Gujarat won the toss and elected to bat.

28 February 2021
Scorecard

Hyderabad; 345/6 (50 overs)	v	Goa; 343/5 (50 overs)
Tanmay Agarwal 150 (131); Lakshay Garg 2/60 (10 overs)		Eknath Kerkar 169* (143); Ravi Teja 3/69 (10 overs)

Hyderabad won by 2 runs
Pithwala Stadium, Surat
Umpires: Saidharshan Kumar and Somnath Jha

- Goa won the toss and elected to field.
- Satwik Reddy and Yash Gupta (Hyderabad) both made their List A debuts.

28 February 2021
Scorecard

Tripura; 230 (48.4 overs)	v	Chhattisgarh; 233/5 (47.1 overs)
Samrat Singha 102 (88); Ashutosh Singh 3/22 (7 overs)		Amandeep Khare 101* (126); Parvez Sultan 2/40 (10 overs)

Chhattisgarh won by 5 wickets
Kholvad Gymkhana Ground, Kamrej
Umpires: Chirra Ravikanthreddy and Rajesh Timaney

- Chhattisgarh won the toss and elected to field.
- Subham Ghosh (Tripura) made his List A debut.
