= 2020–21 Syed Mushtaq Ali Trophy Group B =

Cricket tournament

2019–20 Syed Mushtaq Ali Trophy Group B
- Dates: 10 – 18 January 2021
- Administrator(s): BCCI
- Cricket format: Twenty20 cricket
- Tournament format(s): Round-robin
- Participants: 6

The 2020–21 Syed Mushtaq Ali Trophy was the twelfth season of the Syed Mushtaq Ali Trophy, a Twenty20 cricket tournament played in India. It was contested by 38 teams, divided into six groups, with six teams in Group B. Assam, Bengal, Hyderabad, Jharkhand, Odisha and Tamil Nadu were placed in Group B, with all the matches taking place in Kolkata. Tamil Nadu won Group A to qualify for the knockout stage of the tournament.

== Points table ==
| Team | Pld | W | L | T | NR | Pts | NRR |
|---|---|---|---|---|---|---|---|
| Tamil Nadu (Q) | 5 | 5 | 0 | 0 | 0 | 20 | +1.88 |
| Bengal | 5 | 3 | 2 | 0 | 0 | 12 | +0.654 |
| Jharkhand | 5 | 3 | 2 | 0 | 0 | 12 | +0.23 |
| Assam | 5 | 2 | 3 | 0 | 0 | 8 | -0.961 |
| Hyderabad | 5 | 1 | 4 | 0 | 0 | 4 | –0.199 |
| Odisha | 5 | 1 | 4 | 0 | 0 | 4 | –1.569 |

- Top team advanced to the Knockout Stage

== Fixtures ==
=== Round 1 ===
10 January 2021
Scorecard

| Odisha; 113 (20 overs) | v | Bengal; 114/1 (12.2 overs) |
| Rajesh Dhuper 37 (37); Ishan Porel 3/26 (4 overs) | | Vivek Singh 54* (35); Govinda Poddar 1/10 (2 overs) |

Bengal won by 9 wickets
Jadavpur University Complex, Kolkata
Umpires: Anil Dandekar and Puttarangaiah Jayapal

- Bengal won the toss and elected to field.
- Aditya Rout, Sunil Roul (Odisha), Kaif Ahmed and Suvankar Bal (Bengal) all made their T20 debuts.

10 January 2021
Scorecard

| Tamil Nadu; 189/5 (20 overs) | v | Jharkhand; 123/7 (20 overs) |
| Chezhian Harinishanth 92* (64); Rahul Shukla 2/27 (2 overs) | | Anand Singh 28* (24); Sonu Yadav 3/31 (4 overs) |

Tamil Nadu won by 66 runs
Eden Gardens, Kolkata
Umpires: Bharati Vij and C. K. Nandan

- Jharkhand won the toss and elected to field.
- Sonu Yadav (Tamil Nadu) made his T20 debut.

10 January 2021
Scorecard

| Assam; 159/5 (20 overs) | v | Hyderabad; 157/8 (20 overs) |
| Riyan Parag 51* (40); Kartikeya Kak 3/42 (4 overs) | | Himalay Agarwal 29 (22); Pritam Das 3/30 (4 overs) |

Assam won by 2 runs
Eden Gardens, Kolkata
Umpires: Navdeep Singh and Ulhas Gandhe

- Hyderabad won the toss and elected to field.
- Abhishek Thakuri, Amlanjyoti Das, Denish Das, Rahul Singh (Assam), Kartikeya Kak and Rahul Buddhi (Hyderabad) all made their T20 debuts.

=== Round 2 ===
12 January 2021
Scorecard

| Bengal; 161/6 (20 overs) | v | Jharkhand; 145/9 (20 overs) |
| Vivek Singh 100* (64); Monu Kumar 3/30 (4 overs) | | Virat Singh 47 (35); Ishan Porel 3/34 (4 overs) |

Bengal won by 16 runs
Eden Gardens, Kolkata
Umpires: Navdeep Singh and Ulhas Gandhe

- Bengal won the toss and elected to bat.
- Kumar Suraj and Pankaj Kumar (Jharkhand) both made their T20 debuts.
- Vivek Singh (Bengal) scored his first century in a T20 match.

12 January 2021
Scorecard

| Hyderabad; 153/8 (20 overs) | v | Odisha; 147/4 (20 overs) |
| Tilak Varma 44 (35); Suryakant Pradhan 3/34 (4 overs) | | Govinda Poddar 50 (33); Chama Milind 2/24 (4 overs) |

Hyderabad won by 6 runs
Jadavpur University Complex, Kolkata
Umpires: Anil Dandekar and Puttarangaiah Jayapal

- Odisha won the toss and elected to field.
- Ankitkar Jaiswal (Odisha), Mickil Jaiswal and Pragnay Reddy (Hyderabad) all made their T20 debuts.

12 January 2021
Scorecard

| Assam; 126/7 (20 overs) | v | Tamil Nadu; 128/0 (15 overs) |
| Rajjakuddin Ahmed 29 (14); Murugan Ashwin 2/16 (4 overs) | | Narayan Jagadeesan 78* (50) |

Tamil Nadu won by 10 wickets
Eden Gardens, Kolkata
Umpires: Bharati Vij and C. K. Nandan

- Tamil Nadu won the toss and elected to field.

=== Round 3 ===
14 January 2021
Scorecard

| Jharkhand; 233/3 (20 overs) | v | Assam; 182/7 (20 overs) |
| Virat Singh 103* (53); Pritam Das 2/40 (4 overs) | | Riyan Parag 67 (38); Monu Kumar 3/23 (4 overs) |

Jharkhand won by 51 runs
Jadavpur University Complex, Kolkata
Umpires: Anil Dandekar and Puttarangaiah Jayapal

- Jharkhand won the toss and elected to field.

14 January 2021
Scorecard

| Odisha; 132/9 (20 overs) | v | Tamil Nadu; 136/2 (15.1 overs) |
| Suryakant Pradhan 23 (10); Murugan Ashwin 3/16 (4 overs) | | Narayan Jagadeesan 61 (38); Ankit Yadav 1/17 (2 overs) |

Tamil Nadu won by 8 wickets
Eden Gardens, Kolkata
Umpires: Bharati Vij and C. K. Nandan

- Odisha won the toss and elected to bat.
- Gourav Choudhury (Odisha) made his T20 debut.

14 January 2021
Scorecard

| Hyderabad; 157 (20 overs) | v | Bengal; 161/4 (18.2 overs) |
| Tilak Varma 50 (30); Akash Deep 4/35 (4 overs) | | Shreevats Goswami 69* (48); Ravi Teja 2/28 (4 overs) |

Bengal won by 6 wickets
Eden Gardens, Kolkata
Umpires: Navdeep Singh and Ulhas Gandhe

- Bengal won the toss and elected to field.

=== Round 4 ===
16 January 2021
Scorecard

| Hyderabad; 152/7 (20 overs) | v | Tamil Nadu; 155/3 (19.3 overs) |
| Bavanaka Sandeep 41 (36); Baba Aparajith 2/22 (4 overs) | | Narayan Jagadeesan 78* (51); Ravi Teja 1/21 (4 overs) |

Tamil Nadu won by 7 wickets
Jadavpur University Complex, Kolkata
Umpires: Anil Dandekar and Puttarangaiah Jayapal

- Hyderabad won the toss and elected to bat.
- Hitesh Yadav and Rakshann Readdi (Hyderabad) both made their T20 debuts.

16 January 2021
Scorecard

| Jharkhand; 182/4 (20 overs) | v | Odisha; 128 (17.5 overs) |
| Virat Singh 67 (37); Tarani Sa 2/37 (4 overs) | | Gourav Choudhury 36 (23); Bal Krishna 4/21 (4 overs) |

Jharkhand won by 54 runs
Eden Gardens, Kolkata
Umpires: Bharati Vij and C. K. Nandan

- Jharkhand won the toss and elected to bat.
- Bal Krishna, Vikash Vishal (Jharkhand), Tarani Sa and Walter Toppo (Odisha) all made their T20 debuts.

16 January 2021
Scorecard

| Assam; 157/5 (20 overs) | v | Bengal; 144/8 (20 overs) |
| Riyan Parag 77* (54); Ishan Porel 2/34 (4 overs) | | Anustup Majumdar 48* (47); Pritam Das 3/27 (4 overs) |

Assam won by 13 runs
Eden Gardens, Kolkata
Umpires: Navdeep Singh and Ulhas Gandhe

- Bengal won the toss and elected to field.
- Erik Roy (Assam) made his T20 debut.

=== Round 5 ===
18 January 2021
Scorecard

| Assam; 148/5 (20 overs) | v | Odisha; 154/6 (19 overs) |
| Riyan Parag 42 (26); Govinda Poddar 2/28 (4 overs) | | Subhranshu Senapati 64 (48); Pritam Das 2/19 (3 overs) |

Odisha won by 4 wickets
Jadavpur University Complex, Kolkata
Umpires: Anil Dandekar and Puttarangaiah Jayapal

- Assam won the toss and elected to bat.
- Ashish Rai and Sukesh Heera (Odisha) both made their T20 debuts.

18 January 2021
Scorecard

| Hyderabad; 139/8 (20 overs) | v | Jharkhand; 139/9 (20 overs) |
| Bavanaka Sandeep 37 (34); Vivekanand Tiwari 3/25 (4 overs) | | Utkarsh Singh 29 (26); Ajay Dev Goud 4/22 (4 overs) |

Match tied
(Jharkhand won the Super Over)
Eden Gardens, Kolkata
Umpires: Bharati Vij and C. K. Nandan

- Jharkhand won the toss and elected to field.

18 January 2021
Scorecard

| Bengal; 163/8 (20 overs) | v | Tamil Nadu; 167/2 (18 overs) |
| Kaif Ahmed 63* (47); Baba Aparajith 2/20 (4 overs) | | Narayan Jagadeesan 71* (45); Arnab Nandi 1/33 (4 overs) |

Tamil Nadu won by 8 wickets
Eden Gardens, Kolkata
Umpires: Navdeep Singh and Ulhas Gandhe

- Tamil Nadu won the toss and elected to field.
