= 2017–18 Ranji Trophy Group A =

Cricket tournament

2017-18 Ranji Trophy Group A
- The Ranji Trophy, awarded to the winners
- Dates: 6 October 2017 – 28 November 2017
- Administrator(s): BCCI
- Cricket format: First-class cricket
- Tournament format(s): Round-robin
- Host(s): India
- Participants: 7

The 2017–18 Ranji Trophy was the 84th season of the Ranji Trophy, the first-class cricket tournament in India. It was contested by 28 teams divided into four groups, each containing seven teams. The top two teams from Group A progressed to the quarterfinals of the competition. Both of Hyderabad's first two matches were abandoned due to rain. Following the conclusion of the sixth round of fixtures, both Karnataka and Delhi had progressed to the knockout stage of the competition.

== Teams ==
The following teams were placed in Group A, based on their average points in the previous three years:

- Assam
- Delhi
- Hyderabad
- Karnataka
- Maharashtra
- Railways
- Uttar Pradesh

== Points table ==
Team	Pld	W	L	D	A	Pts	NRR
Karnataka	6	4	0	2	0	32	+0.479
Delhi	6	3	0	3	0	27	+0.333
Maharashtra	6	2	2	1	1	16	+0.084
Hyderabad	6	2	1	1	2	16	–0.156
Railways	6	2	3	1	0	14	–0.312
Uttar Pradesh	6	0	3	2	1	5	+0.508
Assam	6	0	4	2	0	2	–0.977

- Top two teams advanced to the knockout stage

== Fixtures ==
=== Round 1 ===
6–9 October 2017
Scorecard

Assam	v	Delhi
258 (95 overs); Swarupam Purkayastha 66 (133); Ishant Sharma 5/38 (20 overs)		435 (135.3 overs); Gautam Gambhir 137 (249); Abu Nechim 7/68 (23.3 overs)
255 (108.4 overs); Sibsankar Roy 87 (222); Manan Sharma 3/58 (21 overs)		49/2 (8 overs); Unmukt Chand 25* (22); Krishna Das 2/22 (4 overs)

Match drawn
Feroz Shah Kotla Ground, Delhi
Umpires: K. N. Ananthapadmanabhan and Krishnaraj Srinath
Player of the match: Gautam Gambhir (Delhi)

- Delhi won the toss and elected to field.
- Kulwant Khejroliya, Anuj Rawat (Delhi) and Rahul Singh (Assam) all made their first-class debuts.

6–9 October 2017
Scorecard

Hyderabad	v	Maharashtra

Match abandoned
Gymkhana Ground, Hyderabad
Umpires: Navdeep Singh and Virender Sharma

- No toss.
- No play was possible due to rain.

6–9 October 2017
Scorecard

Railways	v	Uttar Pradesh
182 (76 overs); Ashish Yadav 53* (85); Ankit Rajpoot 3/30 (19 overs)		250 (85.5 overs); Akshdeep Nath 75 (160); Anureet Singh 3/42 (22 overs)
161 (63.3 overs); Arindam Ghosh 57 (160); Ankit Rajpoot 4/34 (19.3 overs)		72 (26 overs); Suresh Raina 29 (44); Ashish Yadav 4/26 (9 overs)

Railways won by 21 runs
Ekana International Cricket Stadium, Lucknow
Umpires: Saiyed Khalid and Nand Kishore
Player of the match: Ashish Yadav (Railways)

- Railways won the toss and elected to bat.
- Kartik Tyagi and Zeeshan Ansari (Uttar Pradesh) both made their first-class debuts.
- Railways defended a total of 94 in the fourth innings, the second-lowest successfully defended target in the history of the Ranji Trophy.

=== Round 2 ===
14–17 October 2017
Scorecard

Hyderabad	v	Uttar Pradesh

Match abandoned
Gymkhana Ground, Hyderabad
Umpires: Pashchim Pathak and Amiesh Saheba

- No toss.
- No play was possible due to rain.

14–17 October 2017
Scorecard

Delhi	v	Railways
447 (144.5 overs); Manan Sharma 136 (216); Anureet Singh 4/92 (34 overs)		136 (59.4 overs); Shivakant Shukla 29 (99); Manan Sharma 4/50 (19 overs)
		206 (78.5 overs) (f/o); Nitin Bhille 72 (204); Vikas Mishra 4/37 (19.5 overs)

Delhi won by an innings and 105 runs
Karnail Singh Stadium, Delhi
Umpires: Belur Ravi and Chirra Ravikanthreddy
Player of the match: Manan Sharma (Delhi)

- Delhi won the toss and elected to bat.
- Himmat Singh (Delhi) made his first-class debut.
- Manan Sharma (Delhi) scored his maiden first-class century.

14–17 October 2017
Scorecard

Assam	v	Karnataka
145 (59.1 overs); Gokul Sharma 55 (114); Shreyas Gopal 3/43 (13 overs)		469/7d (126.4 overs); Krishnappa Gowtham 149 (170); Arup Das 4/113 (41 overs)
203 (73.1 overs); Gokul Sharma 66 (124); Vinay Kumar 4/31 (14.1 overs)

Karnataka won by an innings and 121 runs
Sri Jayachamarajendra College of Engineering Ground, Mysore
Umpires: Umesh Dubey and Nitin Pandit
Player of the match: Krishnappa Gowtham (Karnataka)

- Karnataka won the toss and elected to field.
- Krishnappa Gowtham (Karnataka) scored his maiden first-class century.

=== Round 3 ===
24–27 October 2017
Scorecard

Maharashtra	v	Uttar Pradesh
312 (106.1 overs); Ankit Bawne 119 (223); Saurabh Kumar 7/110 (42.1 overs)		271 (82.2 overs); Eklavya Dwivedi 71 (131); Chirag Khurana 6/53 (22.2 overs)
282/7d (84 overs); Rahul Tripathi 91 (121); Saurabh Kumar 4/105 (36 overs)		292 (68 overs); Rinku Singh 122 (136); Chirag Khurana 131 (34 overs)

Maharashtra won by 31 runs
Ekana International Cricket Stadium, Lucknow
Umpires: Yeshwant Barde and Krishnamachari Srinivasan
Player of the match: Chirag Khurana (Maharashtra)

- Maharashtra won the toss and elected to bat.
- Vineet Panwar (Uttar Pradesh) and Jagdish Zope (Maharashtra) both made their first-class debuts.

24–27 October 2017
Scorecard

Assam	v	Railways
244 (93.2 overs); Tarjinder Singh 43 (139); Deepak Bansal 4/61 (25 overs)		483/7d (138.4 overs); Arindam Ghosh 109 (192); Dhiraj Goswami 2/93 (28 overs)
55 (32.3 overs); Kunal Saikia 16 (55); Anureet Singh 5/28 (13.3 overs)

Railways won by an innings and 184 runs
Barsapara Cricket Stadium, Guwahati
Umpires: Saiyed Khalid and Nand Kishore
Player of the match: Anureet Singh (Railways)

- Railways won the toss and elected to field.
- Anureet Singh (Railways) took his fifteenth five-wicket haul in first-class cricket.

24–27 October 2017
Scorecard

Karnataka	v	Hyderabad
183 (62.2 overs); Stuart Binny 61 (88); Mohammed Siraj 4/42 (15 overs)		136 (64.4 overs); Kolla Sumanth 68 (150); Shreyas Gopal 5/27 (9.4 overs)
332 (105.4); Karun Nair 134 (229); Mehdi Hasan 5/88 (36 overs)		320 (109.4 overs); Bavanaka Sandeep 80 (205); Shreyas Gopal 4/91 (18.4 overs)

Karnataka won by 59 runs
KSCA Navule Stadium, Shimoga
Umpires: Navdeep Singh and Pashchim Pathak
Player of the match: Karun Nair (Karnataka)

- Karnataka won the toss and elected to bat.

=== Round 4 ===
1–4 November 2017
Scorecard

Hyderabad	v	Railways
474/9d (151 overs); Ambati Rayudu 112 (189); Manish Rao 3/76 (19 overs)		246 (94.2 overs); Anureet Singh 60 (95); Ravi Teja 5/49 (18.2 overs)
23/0 (5.2 overs); Tanmay Agarwal 15* (16)		250 (72 overs) (f/o); Manish Rao 85* (128); Mehdi Hasan 4/35 (17 overs)

Hyderabad won by 10 wickets
Karnail Singh Stadium, Delhi
Umpires: Stephen Harris and Pashchim Pathak
Player of the match: Ravi Teja (Hyderabad)

- Railways won the toss and elected to field.
- Manish Rao (Railways), Rohit Rayudu and Ravi Teja (Hyderabad) all made their first-class debuts.

1–4 November 2017
Scorecard

Maharashtra	v	Karnataka
245 (55 overs); Rahul Tripathi 120 (114); Vinay Kumar 6/59 (14 overs)		628/5d (176 overs); Mayank Agarwal 304* (494); Chirag Khurana 3/147 (39 overs)
247 (66.2 overs); Ruturaj Gaikwad 65 (130); Abhimanyu Mithun 5/66 (18 overs)

Karnataka won by an innings and 136 runs
Maharashtra Cricket Association Stadium, Pune
Umpires: Abhijit Deshmukh and Martin Saggers
Player of the match: Mayank Agarwal (Karnataka)

- Karnataka won the toss and elected to field.
- Dega Nischal (Karnataka) made his first-class debut.
- Mayank Agarwal (Karnataka) scored his maiden triple century in first-class cricket. It was also the 50th triple century scored in first-class cricket in India.

1–4 November 2017
Scorecard

Uttar Pradesh	v	Delhi
291 (89.5 overs); Mohammad Saif 83 (169); Ishant Sharma 3/38 (18 overs)		269 (87 overs); Dhruv Shorey 98* (200); Saurabh Kumar 4/87 (31 overs)
229 (67.5 overs); Akshdeep Nath 110 (178); Navdeep Saini 4/46 (15.5 overs)		256/6 (72.1 overs); Nitish Rana 67 (110); Mohammad Saif 2/20 (6.1 overs)

Delhi won by 4 wickets
Palam A Ground, Model Sports Complex, Delhi
Umpires: Umesh Dubey and Rohan Pandit
Player of the match: Akshdeep Nath (Delhi)

- Delhi won the toss and elected to field.
- Play was stopped towards the end of day 3 after a man drove his car onto the pitch.

=== Round 5 ===
9–12 November 2017
Scorecard

Uttar Pradesh	v	Assam
349 (73.2 overs); Saurabh Kumar 133 (118); Rajjakuddin Ahmed 3/103 (21 overs)		318 (108.1 overs); Sib Sankar Roy 72 (129); Saurabh Kumar 5/54 (32 overs)
357/6d (86.4 overs); Umang Sharma 148 (235); Abu Nechim 2/58 (14.4 overs)		148/4 (55 overs); Gokul Sharma 62 (103); Saurabh Kumar 3/52 (21 overs)

Match drawn
Barsapara Cricket Stadium, Guwahati
Umpires: Saiyed Khalid and Sivasubramaniyan Shankar
Player of the match: Saurabh Kumar (Uttar Pradesh)

- Assam won the toss and elected to field.
- Rajjakuddin Ahmed (Assam) and Abhishek Goswami (Uttar Pradesh) both made their first-class debuts.

9–12 November 2017
Scorecard

Karnataka	v	Delhi
649 (172.2 overs); Mayank Agarwal 176 (250); Manan Sharma 3/151 (37 overs)		301 (95 overs); Gautam Gambhir 144 (244); Abhimanyu Mithun 5/70 (23 overs)
235/3 (63 overs); KL Rahul 92 (109); Navdeep Saini 1/28 (9 overs)

Match drawn
KSCA Cricket Ground, Bengaluru
Umpires: Stephen Harris and Vineet Kulkarni
Player of the match: Stuart Binny (Karnataka)

- Karnataka won the toss and elected to bat.

9–12 November 2017
Scorecard

Maharashtra	v	Railways
481 (155.5 overs); Rohit Motwani 189 (328); Amit Mishra 4/98 (32.5 overs)		381 (131.2 overs); Pratham Singh 73 (154); Chirag Khurana 2/58 (21 overs)
186/6d (37 overs); Naushad Shaikh 40 (32); Karan Thakur 3/43 (10 overs)		54/1 (18 overs); Saurabh Wakaskar 23* (57); Chirag Khurana 1/16 (7 overs)

Match drawn
Maharashtra Cricket Association Stadium, Pune
Umpires: Chirra Ravikanthreddy and Virender Sharma
Player of the match: Rohit Motwani (Maharashtra)

- Railways won the toss and elected to field.
- Mukesh Choudhary (Maharashtra) and Pratham Singh (Railways) both made their first-class debuts.

=== Round 6 ===
17–20 November 2017
Scorecard

Karnataka	v	Uttar Pradesh
655 (186.1 overs); Manish Pandey 238 (301); Imtiyaz Ahmed 6/110 (32.1 overs)		331 (84 overs); Umang Sharma 89 (158); Shreyas Gopal 3/63 (12 overs)
262/0 (59 overs); Mayank Agarwal 133* (171)

Match drawn
Green Park Stadium, Kanpur
Umpires: Anil Dandekar and Navdeep Singh

- Karnataka won the toss and elected to bat.
- Dega Nischal (Karnataka) scored his maiden first-class century.

17–20 November 2017
Scorecard

Hyderabad	v	Assam
326 (90.4 overs); Bavanaka Sandeep 84 (122); Arup Das 5/112 (28.4 overs)		136 (48.5 overs); Gokul Sharma 39 (72); Mohammad Muddassir 5/36 (11.5 overs)
144/6 (39 overs); Ambati Rayudu 52* (73); Arup Das 2/21 (7 overs)		331 (109 overs) (f/o); Amit Sinha 122 (233); Sudeep Tyagi 3/34 (16 overs)

Hyderabad won by 4 wickets
Dr. Bhupen Hazarika Cricket Stadium, Guwahati
Umpires: Sudhir Asnani and Tapan Sharma
Player of the match: Ambati Rayudu (Hyderabad)

- Assam won the toss and elected to field.
- Rajat Khan, Riyan Parag (Assam) and Mohammad Muddassir (Hyderabad) all made their first-class debuts.

17–20 November 2017
Scorecard

Delhi	v	Maharashtra
419 (111.1 overs); Nitish Rana 174 (264); Satyajeet Bachhav 4/87 (29 overs)		99 (35 overs); Chirag Khurana 29 (31); Ishant Sharma 3/14 (6 overs)
		259 (63.3 overs) (f/o); Rahul Tripathi 106 (78); Navdeep Saini 4/57 (18 overs)

Delhi won by an innings and 61 runs
Feroz Shah Kotla Ground, Delhi
Umpires: Yeshwant Barde and Nand Kishore
Player of the match: Nitish Rana (Delhi)

- Delhi won the toss and elected to bat.
- Lalit Yadav (Delhi) and Shamshuzama Kazi (Maharashtra) both made their first-class debuts.

=== Round 7 ===
25–28 November 2017
Scorecard

Karnataka	v	Railways
434 (111 overs); Mayank Agarwal 173 (241); Karan Thakur 3/91 (31 overs)		333 (98.4 overs); Mahesh Rawat 124 (182); Shreyas Gopal 4/102 (28.4 overs)
275/4d (71 overs); Mayank Agarwal 134 (178); Karan Thakur 2/68 (14 overs)		167 (63 overs); Pratham Singh 36 (91); Krishnappa Gowtham 7/72 (26 overs)

Karnataka won by 209 runs
Karnail Singh Stadium, Delhi
Umpires: Navdeep Singh and Rohan Pandit
Player of the match: Mayank Agarwal (Karnataka)

- Karnataka won the toss and elected to bat.
- Vinit Dhulap (Railways) made his first-class debut.
- Mayank Agarwal (Karnataka) scored his fifth first-class century of the season and scored his 1,000th run in a single month.

25–28 November 2017
Scorecard

Assam	v	Maharashtra
279 (66.2 overs); Gokul Sharma 87 (141); Nikit Dhumal 5/94 (21 overs)		253 (68.2 overs); Ruturaj Gaikwad 126 (210); Rahul Singh 4/63 (14.2 overs)
189 (63.5 overs); Rishav Das 35 (56); Pradeep Dadhe 5/51 (17.5 overs)		216/3 (47.4 overs); Naushad Shaikh 108* (105); Rajat Khan 1/31 (3 overs)

Maharashtra won by 7 wickets
Pune Club Ground, Pune
Umpires: Puttarangaiah Jayapal and Chirra Ravikanthreddy
Player of the match: Naushad Shaikh (Maharashtra)

- Maharashtra won the toss and elected to field.
- Abhishek Thakuri (Assam) made his first-class debut.
- Pradeep Dadhe (Maharashtra) took his maiden five-wicket haul in first-class cricket.

25–28 November 2017
Scorecard

Delhi	v	Hyderabad
415 (107.4 overs); Himmat Singh 99 (151); Mehdi Hasan 3/103 (27.2 overs)		205 (74.2 overs); Tanmay Agarwal 63 (159); Vikas Mishra 4/36 (10.2 overs)
		442/8 (155.1 overs) (f/o); Akshath Reddy 107 (235); Vikas Mishra 5/116 (34 overs)

Match drawn
Rajiv Gandhi International Cricket Stadium, Hyderabad
Umpires: Anil Dandekar and Pashchim Pathak
Player of the match: Vikas Mishra (Delhi)

- Delhi won the toss and elected to bat.
- Palakodeti Sairam (Hyderabad), Kunal Chandela and Akash Sudan (Delhi) all made their first-class debuts.
