= 2020–21 Syed Mushtaq Ali Trophy Group A =

Cricket tournament

2019–20 Syed Mushtaq Ali Trophy Group A
- Dates: 10 – 18 January 2021
- Administrator: BCCI
- Cricket format: Twenty20 cricket
- Tournament format: Round-robin
- Participants: 6

The 2020–21 Syed Mushtaq Ali Trophy was the twelfth season of the Syed Mushtaq Ali Trophy, a Twenty20 cricket tournament played in India. It was contested by 38 teams, divided into six groups, with six teams in Group A. Jammu & Kashmir, Karnataka, Punjab, Railways, Tripura and Uttar Pradesh were placed in Group A, with all the matches taking place in Bengaluru. Punjab won Group A to qualify for the knockout stage of the tournament. Karnataka also qualified for the quarter-finals, finishing as one of the best two second placed teams across groups A to E.

== Points table ==
Team	Pld	W	L	T	NR	Pts	NRR
Punjab (Q)	5	5	0	0	0	20	+2.483
Karnataka (Q)	5	4	1	0	0	16	+0.292
Jammu & Kashmir	5	3	2	0	0	12	+0.243
Railways	5	2	3	0	0	8	–1.357
Uttar Pradesh	5	1	4	0	0	4	–0.291
Tripura	5	0	5	0	0	0	–1.427

- Top team advanced to the Knockout Stage

== Fixtures ==
=== Round 1 ===
10 January 2021
Scorecard

Karnataka; 150/5 (20 overs)	v	Jammu & Kashmir; 107 (18.4 overs)
Krishnan Shrijith 48* (31); Parvez Rasool 2/18 (4 overs)		Abdul Samad 30 (27); Prasidh Krishna 3/34 (3.4 overs)

Karnataka won by 43 runs
KSCA Cricket Ground, Bengaluru
Umpires: Saurabh Dhote and Sundaram Ravi

- Jammu & Kashmir won the toss and elected to field.
- Krishnan Shrijith (Karnataka) and Qamran Iqbal (Jammu & Kashmir) both made their T20 debuts.

10 January 2021
Scorecard

Punjab; 134/7 (20 overs)	v	Uttar Pradesh; 123/5 (20 overs)
Prabhsimran Singh 43 (41); Bhuvneshwar Kumar 3/22 (4 overs)		Suresh Raina 56* (50); Siddarth Kaul 2/28 (4 overs)

Punjab won by 11 runs
KSCA Cricket Ground 2, Bengaluru
Umpires: Nikhil Patwardhan and Sivasubramaniyan Shankar

- Punjab won the toss and elected to bat.
- Dhruv Jurel and Karan Sharma (Uttar Pradesh) both made their T20 debuts.

10 January 2021
Scorecard

Tripura; 170/3 (20 overs)	v	Railways; 173/4 (19.3 overs)
Milind Kumar 61* (40); Karn Sharma 1/23 (4 overs)		Mrunal Devdhar 61* (50); Sankar Paul 3/17 (4 overs)

Railways won by 6 wickets
KSCA Cricket Ground 3, Bengaluru
Umpires: Dharmesh Bhardwaj and Nitin Pandit

- Railways won the toss and elected to field.
- Chandan Ray, Sankar Paul (Tripura), Abhishek Pandey, Dhrushant Soni and Navneet Virk (Railways) all made their T20 debuts.

=== Round 2 ===
12 January 2021
Scorecard

Tripura; 93 (18.1 overs)	v	Jammu & Kashmir; 94/3 (14.5 overs)
Udiyan Bose 28 (28); Auqib Nabi 3/10 (2.1 overs)		Suryansh Raina 33 (25); Manisankar Murasingh 2/19 (3 overs)

Jammu & Kashmir won by 7 wickets
KSCA Cricket Ground 2, Bengaluru
Umpires: Nikhil Patwardhan and Sivasubramaniyan Shankar

- Jammu & Kashmir won the toss and elected to field.
- Puneet Kumar (Jammu & Kashmir) made his T20 debut.

12 January 2021
Scorecard

Uttar Pradesh; 133/9 (20 overs)	v	Railways; 137/2 (17.4 overs)
Karan Sharma 55 (30); Harsh Tyagi 2/17 (3 overs)		Mrunal Devdhar 57 (52); Bhuvneshwar Kumar 1/21 (4 overs)

Railways won by 8 wickets
KSCA Cricket Ground 3, Bengaluru
Umpires: Saurabh Dhote and Sundaram Ravi

- Railways won the toss and elected to field.

12 January 2021
Scorecard

Karnataka; 125/8 (20 overs)	v	Punjab; 127/1 (14.4 overs)
Rohan Kadam 32 (33); Siddarth Kaul 4/26 (4 overs)		Prabhsimran Singh 89* (52); Krishnappa Gowtham 1/28 (4 overs)

Punjab won by 9 wickets
KSCA Cricket Ground, Bengaluru
Umpires: Akshay Totre and Sanjay Kumar Singh

- Punjab won the toss and elected to field.

=== Round 3 ===
14 January 2021
Scorecard

Punjab; 200/4 (20 overs)	v	Railways; 83 (17.1 overs)
Abhishek Sharma 107 (62); Dhrushant Soni 2/29 (4 overs)		Harsh Tyagi 16 (17); Harpreet Brar 4/22 (4 overs)

Punjab won by 117 runs
KSCA Cricket Ground 2, Bengaluru
Umpires: Dharmesh Bhardwaj and Nitin Pandit

- Railways won the toss and elected to field.
- Akash Pandey and Vineet Dhaka (Railways) both made their T20 debuts.

14 January 2021
Scorecard

Uttar Pradesh; 124/5 (20 overs)	v	Jammu & Kashmir; 126/2 (15 overs)
Priyam Garg 35 (36); Mujtaba Yousuf 3/14 (4 overs)		Abdul Samad 54* (35); Mohsin Khan 2/17 (4 overs)

Jammu & Kashmir won by 8 wickets
KSCA Cricket Ground, Bengaluru
Umpires: Akshay Totre and Sanjay Kumar Singh

- Jammu & Kashmir won the toss and elected to field.

14 January 2021
Scorecard

Karnataka; 167/5 (20 overs)	v	Tripura; 157/4 (20 overs)
Devdutt Padikkal 99* (67); Rana Dutta 2/41 (4 overs)		Manisankar Murasingh 61* (33); Praveen Dubey 1/20 (2 overs)

Karnataka won by 10 runs
KSCA Cricket Ground 3, Bengaluru
Umpires: Saurabh Dhote and Sundaram Ravi

- Tripura won the toss and elected to field.
- Parvez Sultan (Tripura) made his T20 debut.

=== Round 4 ===
16 January 2021
Scorecard

Tripura; 122/6 (20 overs)	v	Uttar Pradesh; 123/1 (13.1 overs)
Milind Kumar 48 (49); Shanu Saini 2/16 (4 overs)		Karan Sharma 68* (36); Ajoy Sarkar 1/29 (4 overs)

Uttar Pradesh won by 9 wickets
KSCA Cricket Ground, Bengaluru
Umpires: Nikhil Patwardhan and Sivasubramaniyan Shankar

- Uttar Pradesh won the toss and elected to field.
- Abhishek Goswami, Aaqib Khan (Uttar Pradesh) and Dipayan Debbarma (Tripura) all made their T20 debuts.

16 January 2021
Scorecard

Railways; 152/5 (20 overs)	v	Karnataka; 158/8 (19.4 overs)
Shivam Chaudhary 48 (38); Prasidh Krishna 2/25 (4 overs)		Aniruddha Joshi 64* (40); T Pradeep 3/19 (4 overs)

Karnataka won by 2 wickets
KSCA Cricket Ground 2, Bengaluru
Umpires: Dharmesh Bhardwaj and Nitin Pandit

- Railways won the toss and elected to bat.
- Avijit Singh (Railways) made his T20 debut.

16 January 2021
Scorecard

Jammu & Kashmir; 139/8 (20 overs)	v	Punjab; 140/0 (14.3 overs)
Shubham Pundir 42 (34); Siddarth Kaul 4/33 (4 overs)		Prabhsimran Singh 73* (46)

Punjab won by 10 wickets
KSCA Cricket Ground 3, Bengaluru
Umpires: Akshay Totre and Sanjay Kumar Singh

- Punjab won the toss and elected to field

=== Round 5 ===
18 January 2021
Scorecard

Railways; 133/9 (20 overs)	v	Jammu & Kashmir; 135/3 (15.5 overs)
Mrunal Devdhar 57 (48); Umran Malik 3/24 (4 overs)		Suryansh Raina 48 (36); Karn Sharma 2/17 (4 overs)

Jammu & Kashmir won by 7 wickets
KSCA Cricket Ground, Bengaluru
Umpires: Saurabh Dhote and Sundaram Ravi

- Jammu & Kashmir won the toss and elected to field.
- Aamir Aziz, Jiyaad Magrey, Skalzang Kalyan, Umran Malik (Jammu & Kashmir) and Yuvraj Singh (Railways) all made their T20 debuts.

18 January 2021
Scorecard

Uttar Pradesh; 132/8 (20 overs)	v	Karnataka; 136/5 (19.3 overs)
Abhishek Goswami 47 (32); Praveen Dubey 3/15 (4 overs)		Shreyas Gopal 47* (28); Karan Sharma 2/23 (4 overs)

Karnataka won by 5 wickets
KSCA Cricket Ground 3, Bengaluru
Umpires: Dharmesh Bhardwaj and Nitin Pandit

- Karnataka won the toss and elected to field.
- Nalin Mishra (Uttar Pradesh) made his T20 debut.

18 January 2021
Scorecard

Punjab; 183/3 (20 overs)	v	Tripura; 161/4 (20 overs)
Mandeep Singh 99* (66); Sankar Paul 1/21 (1 over)		Milind Kumar 64* (40); Sandeep Sharma 1/21 (4 overs)

Punjab won by 22 runs
KSCA Cricket Ground 2, Bengaluru
Umpires: Nikhil Patwardhan and Sivasubramaniyan Shankar

- Tripura won the toss and elected to field.
- Subham Ghosh (Tripura) made his T20 debut.
