= 2021–22 Vijay Hazare Trophy Group E =

Cricket tournament

- Dates: 8 – 27 December 2021
- Administrator(s): BCCI
- Cricket format: List A cricket
- Tournament format(s): Round-robin
- Participants: 6

The 2021–22 Vijay Hazare Trophy was the twentieth season of the Vijay Hazare Trophy, a List A cricket tournament that was played in India. It was being contested by 38 teams, divided into six groups, with six teams in Group E. The tournament was announced by the BCCI on 3 July 2021. Services won Group E to progress to the quarter-finals, with Rajasthan finishing in second place to advance to the preliminary quarter-finals.

== Points table ==
Pos	Team	Pld	W	L	T	NR	Pts	NRR
1	Services	5	4	1	0	0	16	0.073
2	Rajasthan	5	4	1	0	0	16	0.993
3	Punjab	5	3	1	1	0	14	1.086
4	Goa	5	1	3	1	0	6	−0.428
5	Assam	5	1	4	0	0	4	−1.226
6	Railways	5	1	4	0	0	4	−0.396

Source: ESPN Cricinfo

Advance to Quarter-final
Advance to Preliminary quarter-final

== Fixtures ==
=== Round 1 ===
8 December 2021
Scorecard

Punjab; 219 (49.4 overs)	v	Rajasthan; 223/4 (49 overs)
Gurkeerat Singh Mann 67 (85); Khaleel Ahmed 4/36 (10 overs)		Abhijeet Tomar 104* (118); Mayank Markande 2/44 (10 overs)

Rajasthan won by 6 wickets
JSCA International Stadium Complex, Ranchi
Umpires: Nand Kishore and Rajesh Timaney

- Punjab won the toss and elected to bat.
- Ashwani Kumar (Punjab) made his List A debut.
- Abhijeet Tomar (Rajasthan) scored his first century in List A cricket.

8 December 2021
Scorecard

Assam; 215/9 (50 overs)	v	Goa; 219/5 (48.3 overs)
Swarupam Purkayastha 45 (83); Lakshay Garg 3/37 (7 overs)		Eknath Kerkar 61* (102); Roshan Alam 2/43 (10 overs)

Goa won by 5 wickets
JSCA Oval Ground, Ranchi
Umpires: Abhijit Deshmukh and Sabyasachi Sarkar

- Assam won the toss and elected to bat.

8 December 2021
Scorecard

Services; 254/8 (50 overs)	v	Railways; 249/9 (50 overs)
Devender Lochab 50 (39); Amit Mishra 2/42 (10 overs)		Shivam Chaudhary 49 (61); Pulkit Narang 4/42 (10 overs)

Services won by 5 runs
Metallurgical & Engineering Consultant Ltd Sail Stadium, Ranchi
Umpires: Arun Kumar Basa and Ulhas Gandhe

- Railways won the toss and elected to field.

=== Round 2 ===
9 December 2021
Scorecard

Rajasthan; 257/8 (50 overs)	v	Goa; 173 (42.3 overs)
Abhijeet Tomar 92 (109); Felix Alemao 2/39 (9 overs)		Aditya Kaushik 53 (60); Shubham Sharma 5/12 (9.3 overs)

Rajasthan won by 84 runs
JSCA International Stadium Complex, Ranchi
Umpires: Abhijit Bhattacharya and Nitin Pandit

- Goa won the toss and elected to field.

9 December 2021
Scorecard

Railways; 250 (48.3 overs)	v	Punjab; 252/7 (49 overs)
Mohammad Saif 60 (59); Mayank Markande 4/40 (10 overs)		Gurkeerat Singh Mann 81 (78); Dhrushant Soni 3/58 (9 overs)

Punjab won by 3 wickets
JSCA Oval Ground, Ranchi
Umpires: Nand Kishore and Rajesh Timaney

- Punjab won the toss and elected to field.

9 December 2021
Scorecard

Assam; 206 (49.5 overs)	v	Services; 210/6 (45.3 overs)
Riyan Parag 58 (75); Varun Choudhary 3/44 (9.5 overs)		Ravi Chauhan 47 (67); Swarupam Purkayastha 2/27 (5.3 overs)

Services won by 4 wickets
Metallurgical & Engineering Consultant Ltd Sail Stadium, Ranchi
Umpires: Abhijit Deshmukh and Sabyasachi Sarkar

- Services won the toss and elected to field.

=== Round 3 ===
11 December 2021
Scorecard

Goa; 154 (40.1 overs)	v	Services; 155/9 (44 overs)
Suyash Prabhudessai 32 (52); Raj Bahadur 3/42 (7.1 overs)		Pulkit Narang 67* (93); Felix Alemao 4/34 (10 overs)

Services won by 1 wicket
JSCA International Stadium Complex, Ranchi
Umpires: Arun Kumar Basa and Ulhas Gandhe

- Services won the toss and elected to field.
- Manthan Khutkar (Goa) made his List A debut.

11 December 2021
Scorecard

Assam; 125 (34.5 overs)	v	Punjab; 130/0 (15.2 overs)
Swarupam Purkayastha 36 (62); Arshdeep Singh 4/30 (6.5 overs)		Prabhsimran Singh 73* (55)

Punjab won by 10 wickets
JSCA Oval Ground, Ranchi
Umpires: Abhijit Bhattacharya and Nitin Pandit

- Assam won the toss and elected to bat.

11 December 2021
Scorecard

Railways; 233/9 (50 overs)	v	Rajasthan; 237/4 (45.1 overs)
Shivam Chaudhary 63 (65); Shubham Sharma 3/39 (10 overs)		Mahipal Lomror 85* (85); Karn Sharma 2/43 (10 overs)

Rajasthan won by 6 wickets
Metallurgical & Engineering Consultant Ltd Sail Stadium, Ranchi
Umpires: Nand Kishore and Rajesh Timaney

- Rajasthan won the toss and elected to field.

=== Round 4 ===
12 December 2021
Scorecard

Services; 260/5 (50 overs)	v	Punjab; 261/1 (37.5 overs)
Rajat Paliwal 85* (104); Harpreet Brar 2/41 (10 overs)		Abhishek Sharma 169* (117); Raj Bahadur 1/49 (6 overs)

Punjab won by 9 wickets
JSCA International Stadium Complex, Ranchi
Umpires: Abhijit Deshmukh and Sabyasachi Sarkar

- Services won the toss and elected to bat.

12 December 2021
Scorecard

Goa; 241/7 (50 overs)	v	Railways; 245/8 (50 overs)
Eknath Kerkar 70* (98); Dhrushant Soni 3/59 (10 overs)		Shivam Chaudhary 89 (103); Shubham Ranjane 3/34 (10 overs)

Railways won by 2 wickets
JSCA Oval Ground, Ranchi
Umpires: Arun Kumar Basa and Ulhas Gandhe

- Goa won the toss and elected to bat.
- Akash Pandey (Railways) made his List A debut.

12 December 2021
Scorecard

Rajasthan; 335/3 (50 overs)	v	Assam; 193 (39.1 overs)
Manender Singh 166* (132); Pritam Das 2/72 (10 overs)		Riyan Parag 51 (28); Ravi Bishnoi 4/45 (9.1 overs)

Rajasthan won by 142 runs
Metallurgical & Engineering Consultant Ltd Sail Stadium, Ranchi
Umpires: Abhijit Bhattacharya and Nitin Pandit

- Assam won the toss and elected to field.

=== Round 5 ===
14 December 2021
Scorecard

Assam; 267/8 (50 overs)	v	Railways; 205 (48.1 overs)
Rishav Das 71 (66); Akash Pandey 2/36 (10 overs)		Mohammad Saif 52 (77); Pritam Das 3/38 (7.1 overs)

Assam won by 62 runs
JSCA International Stadium Complex, Ranchi
Umpires: Nand Kishore and Rajesh Timaney

- Assam won the toss and elected to bat.

14 December 2021
Scorecard

Services; 232/7 (50 overs)	v	Rajasthan; 216/9 (50 overs)
Ravi Chauhan 61 (81); Aniket Choudhary 3/20 (7 overs)		Abhijeet Tomar 58 (99); Rahul Singh 3/33 (10 overs)

Services won by 16 runs
JSCA Oval Ground, Ranchi
Umpires: Abhijit Deshmukh and Sabyasachi Sarkar

- Rajasthan won the toss and elected to field.

14 December 2021
Scorecard

Punjab; 288/8 (50 overs)	v	Goa; 288/7 (50 overs)
Gurkeerat Singh Mann 105 (88); Lakshay Garg 3/51 (9 overs)		Snehal Kauthankar 148* (141); Mayank Markande 2/42 (10 overs)

Match tied
Metallurgical & Engineering Consultant Ltd Sail Stadium, Ranchi
Umpires: Arun Kumar Basa and Ulhas Gandhe

- Goa won the toss and elected to field.
- Gurnoor Brar (Punjab), Kashyap Bakhale and Samar Dubhashi (Goa) all made their List A debuts.
