= 2022–23 Vijay Hazare Trophy Group E =

Cricket tournament

- Dates: 12 November – 2 December 2022
- Administrator(s): BCCI
- Cricket format: List A cricket
- Tournament format(s): Round-robin
- Participants: 8

The 2022–23 Vijay Hazare Trophy is the twenty first season of the Vijay Hazare Trophy, a List A cricket tournament that is being played in India. It was contested by 38 teams, divided into five groups, with seven teams in Group E. The tournament was announced by the BCCI on 8 August 2022.

== Points table ==
Pos	Team	Pld	W	L	NR	Pts	NRR
1	Maharashtra	6	6	0	0	24	1.498
2	Mumbai	6	4	2	0	16	1.388
3	Bengal	6	4	2	0	16	1.058
4	Railways	6	3	3	0	12	0.786
5	Pondicherry	6	2	4	0	8	−0.702
6	Services	6	2	4	0	8	−0.249
7	Mizoram	6	0	6	0	0	−4.021

Source: ESPN Cricinfo
Rules for classification: 1) Points; 2) Head-to-head; 3) Net run rate.

Advances to Quarter-final
Advances to Preliminary quarter-final

== Fixtures ==
=== Round 1 ===
12 November 2022
Scorecard

Railways; 218/8 (50 overs)	v	Maharashtra; 219/3 (38.2 overs)
Shivam Chaudhary 46 (61); Shamshuzama Kazi 2/26 (10 overs)		Ruturaj Gaikwad 124* (123); Shivam Chaudhary 1/13 (2 overs)

Maharashtra won by 7 wickets
Metallurgical & Engineering Consultant Ltd Sail Stadium, Ranchi
Umpires: Chirra Ravikanthreddy and Chettithody Shamshuddin

- Maharashtra won the toss and elected to field.
- Rahul Sharma, Yuvraj Singh (Railways) and Saurabh Navale (Maharashtra) all made their List A debuts.

12 November 2022
Scorecard

Mizoram; 156/8 (50 overs)	v	Pondicherry; 158/3 (29.4 overs)
Shreevats Goswami 63 (90); Ankit Sharma 3/33 (10 overs)		Arun Karthik 59 (53); Remruatdika Ralte 1/28 (7 overs)

Pondicherry won by 7 wickets
JSCA Oval Ground, Ranchi
Umpires: Saurabh Dhote and C. K. Nandan

- Pondicherry won the toss and elected to field.
- Rinsangzela Hmamte (Mizoram), Jay Pande and Abin Mathew (Pondicherry) all made their List A debuts.

12 November 2022
Scorecard

Bengal; 121 (31.3 overs)	v	Mumbai; 123/2 (30.2 overs)
Manoj Tiwary 47 (64); Tanush Kotian 4/31 (8 overs)		Ajinkya Rahane 59* (72); Mukesh Kumar 2/20 (8 overs)

Mumbai won by 8 wickets
JSCA International Stadium Complex, Ranchi
Umpires: KN Ananthapadmanabhan and Akshay Totre

- Mumbai won the toss and elected to field.

=== Round 2 ===
13 November 2022
Scorecard

Mumbai; 264/9 (50 overs)	v	Services; 266/2 (45.3 overs)
Yashasvi Jaiswal 104 (122); Diwesh Pathania 3/48 (10 overs)		Shubham Rohilla 135 (119); Royston Dias 1/47 (8 overs)

Services won by 8 wickets
Metallurgical & Engineering Consultant Ltd Sail Stadium, Ranchi
Umpires: KN Ananthapadmanabhan and Akshay Totre

- Services won the toss and elected to field.
- Parth Rekhade (Services) made his List A debut.

13 November 2022
Scorecard

Mizoram; 57 (21.2 overs)	v	Bengal; 59/1 (6.2 overs)
Joseph Lalthankhuma 21 (40); Pradipta Pramanik 4/2 (2.2 overs)		Ritwik Roy Chowdhury 26* (15); Remruatdika Ralte 1/18 (3.2 overs)

Bengal won by 9 wickets
JSCA Oval Ground, Ranchi
Umpires: Saurabh Dhote and Chettithody Shamshuddin

- Services won the toss and elected to field.
- Sudip Kumar Gharami (Bengal) made his List A debut.

13 November 2022
Scorecard

Pondicherry; 289/9 (50 overs)	v	Railways; 290/7 (49.1 overs)
Paras Dogra 102 (89); Susheel Kumar 4/61 (10 overs)		Shivam Chaudhary 115 (125); Sridhar Ashwath 4/55 (10 overs)

Railways won by 3 wickets
JSCA International Stadium Complex, Ranchi
Umpires: C. K. Nandan and Chirra Ravikanthreddy

- Railways won the toss and elected to field.
- Susheel Kumar and Mohit Raut (Railways) both made their List A debuts.
- Player Replacement: Dhrushant Soni for Akash Pandey (Railways).

=== Round 3 ===
15 November 2022
Scorecard

Railways; 399/4 (50 overs)	v	Mizoram; 145/7 (50 overs)
Vivek Singh 136 (124); Joseph Lalthankhuma 3/47 (8 overs)		Taruwar Kohli 67 (89); Akash Pandey 2/20 (10 overs)

Railways won by 254 runs
Metallurgical & Engineering Consultant Ltd Sail Stadium, Ranchi
Umpires: Saurabh Dhote and C. K. Nandan

- Mizoram won the toss and elected to field.

15 November 2022
Scorecard

Services; 302/6 (50 overs)	v	Pondicherry; 303/5 (48 overs)
Ravi Chauhan 105 (117); Sagar Udeshi 2/63 (10 overs)		Paras Dogra 129* (121); Sachidanand Pandey 3/55 (10 overs)

Pondicherry won by 5 wickets
JSCA Oval Ground, Ranchi
Umpires: Chettithody Shamshuddin and Akshay Totre

- Pondicherry won the toss and elected to field.

15 November 2022
Scorecard

Bengal; 279/6 (50 overs)	v	Maharashtra; 282/7 (50 overs)
Sudip Kumar Gharami 127 (132); Rajvardhan Hangargekar 2/43 (7 overs)		Azim Kazi 106 (97); Mukesh Kumar 2/57 (10 overs)

Maharashtra won by 3 wickets
JSCA International Stadium Complex, Ranchi
Umpires: KN Ananthapadmanabhan and Chirra Ravikanthreddy

- Bengal won the toss and elected to bat.

=== Round 4 ===
17 November 2022
Scorecard

Pondicherry; 197 (43.2 overs)	v	Bengal; 202/2 (39 overs)
Paras Dogra 63 (63); Geet Puri 3/24 (9.2 overs)		Anustup Majumdar 100* (106); Sridhar Ashwath 1/23 (6 overs)

Bengal won by 8 wickets
Metallurgical & Engineering Consultant Ltd Sail Stadium, Ranchi
Umpires: Saurabh Dhote and C. K. Nandan

- Bengal won the toss and elected to field.
- Parameeswaran Sivaraman (Pondicherry), Akash Ghatak and Abishek Porel (Bengal) all made their List A debuts.

17 November 2022
Scorecard

Railways; 347/6 (50 overs)	v	Services; 244 (42.2 overs)
Shivam Chaudhary 125 (126); Sachidanand Pandey 1/55 (10 overs)		Ravi Chauhan 65 (59); Karn Sharma 5/39 (10 overs)

Railways won by 103 runs
JSCA Oval Ground, Ranchi
Umpires: Chettithody Shamshuddin and Akshay Totre

- Services won the toss and elected to field.

17 November 2022
Scorecard

Maharashtra; 342/2 (50 overs)	v	Mumbai; 321 (49 overs)
Rahul Tripathi 156* (137); Shams Mulani 1/43 (10 overs)		Yashasvi Jaiswal 142 (135); Satyajeet Bachhav 6/46 (10 overs)

Maharashtra won by 21 runs
JSCA International Stadium Complex, Ranchi
Umpires: KN Ananthapadmanabhan and Chirra Ravikanthreddy

- Maharashtra won the toss and elected to bat.
- Pavan Shah and Kaushal Tambe (Maharashtra) both made their List A debuts.

=== Round 5 ===
19 November 2022
Scorecard

Mizoram; 188/9 (50 overs)	v	Mumbai; 192/3 (22.5 overs)
Shreevats Goswami 56 (78); Royston Dias 3/30 (10 overs)		Yashasvi Jaiswal 63 (45); Parvez Ahmed 1/12 (0.5 over)

Mumbai won by 7 wickets
Metallurgical & Engineering Consultant Ltd Sail Stadium, Ranchi
Umpires: C. K. Nandan and Chirra Ravikanthreddy

- Mizoram won the toss and elected to bat.

19 November 2022
Scorecard

Maharashtra; 304/8 (50 overs)	v	Services; 243 (46.4 overs)
Rahul Tripathi 111 (113); Diwesh Pathania 3/53 (9 overs)		Shubham Rohilla 114 (102); Manoj Ingale 4/40 (8.4 overs)

Maharashtra won by 61 runs
JSCA Oval Ground, Ranchi
Umpires: Chettithody Shamshuddin and Akshay Totre

- Services won the toss and elected to field.

19 November 2022
Scorecard

Bengal; 248/9 (50 overs)	v	Railways; 191 (43.2 overs)
Abhishek Porel 54 (88); Karn Sharma 3/44 (10 overs)		Upendra Yadav 39 (54); Manoj Tiwary 3/26 (5.2 overs)

Bengal won by 57 runs
JSCA International Stadium Complex, Ranchi
Umpires: Saurabh Dhote and KN Ananthapadmanabhan

- Railways won the toss and elected to field.

=== Round 6 ===
21 November 2022
Scorecard

Bengal; 426/4 (50 overs)	v	Services; 379/9 (50 overs)
Sudip Kumar Gharami 162 (129); Arpit Guleria 2/104 (10 overs)		Arjun Sharma 75 (62); Shahbaz Ahmed 4/58 (10 overs)

Bengal won by 47 runs
Metallurgical & Engineering Consultant Ltd Sail Stadium, Ranchi
Umpires: Chirra Ravikanthreddy Chettithody Shamshuddin and

- Services won the toss and elected to field.

21 November 2022
Scorecard

Maharashtra; 341/4 (50 overs)	v	Mizoram; 158/8 (50 overs)
Rahul Tripathi 107 (99); Lalhruai Ralte 3/79 (10 overs)		Shreevats Goswami 35 (67); Vicky Ostwal 4/29 (10 overs)

Maharashtra won by 183 runs
JSCA International Stadium Complex, Ranchi
Umpires: KN Ananthapadmanabhan and Akshay Totre

- Maharashtra won the toss and elected to bat.
- Vicky Ostwal (Maharashtra) made his List A debut.

21 November 2022
Scorecard

Pondicherry; 139 (38 overs)	v	Mumbai; 141/1 (24.2 overs)
Ankit Sharma 79* (84); Shams Mulani 3/45 (10 overs)		Yashasvi Jaiswal 73* (77); A Aravinddaraj 1/26 (6 overs)

Mumbai won by 9 wickets
JSCA Oval Ground, Ranchi
Umpires: Saurabh Dhote and C. K. Nandan

- Mumbai won the toss and elected to field.
- Kothandapani Aravind and A Aravinddaraj (Pondicherry) both made their List A debuts.

=== Round 7 ===
23 November 2022
Scorecard

Maharashtra; 379/7 (50 overs)	v	Pondicherry; 274/7 (50 overs)
Ankit Bawne 184* (143); Ankit Sharma 2/40 (10 overs)		Ankit Sharma 107* (103); Satyajeet Bachhav 2/26 (9 overs)

Maharashtra won by 105 runs
Metallurgical & Engineering Consultant Ltd Sail Stadium, Ranchi
Umpires: Chettithody Shamshuddin and Akshay Totre

- Pondicherry won the toss and elected to field.
- Rohan Suresh (Pondicherry) made his List A debut.

23 November 2022
Scorecard

Railways; 337/5 (50 overs)	v	Mumbai; 338/5 (48.3 overs)
Pratham Singh 109 (108); Tushar Deshpande 1/53 (10 overs)		Sarfaraz Khan 117 (94); Susheel Kumar 3/53 (8 overs)

Mumbai won by 5 wickets
JSCA Oval Ground, Ranchi
Umpires: C. K. Nandan and Chirra Ravikanthreddy

- Railways won the toss and elected to bat.

23 November 2022
Scorecard

Services; 318/6 (50 overs)	v	Mizoram; 197/8 (50 overs)
Shubham Rohilla 99 (90); Remruatdika Ralte 2/77 (9 overs)		Taruwar Kohli 89 (107); Nitin Yadav 2/14 (5 overs)

Services won by 121 runs
JSCA International Stadium Complex, Ranchi
Umpires: K. N. Ananthapadmanabhan and Saurabh Dhote

- Services won the toss and elected to bat.
