= Pradeep =

Pradeep is a Diya lamp, used in Puja (religious ceremonies) in Hinduism, Jainism, & Buddhism. It is related to the name Pradip.

Notable people with the name include:

- Pradeep (Kannada actor)
- Pradeep (Malayalam actor)
- Pradeep Ranganathan
- Kavi Pradeep
- Vidya Pradeep
- Pradeep Kumar (actor)
- Pradeep Kumar (musician)
- G. S. Pradeep
- Pradeep Machiraju
- Pradeep Rawat (actor)
- Pradeep Sharma
- Pradeep Pandey
- Pradeep Shakthi
- Pradeep Sarkar
- Pradeep Sindhu
- Pradeep E. Ragav
- Pradeep Kumar Sinha
- Pradeep Khosla
- Pradeep John
- Deepu Pradeep
- Pradeep Mathur
- Pappachen Pradeep
- Badekkila Pradeep
- Deepu Pradeep
- Pradeep Chandran Nair
- Pradeep (Malayalam actor)
- Pradeep Kumar (politician)
- Pradeep Yadav (Nepalese politician)
- Pradeep Yadav (Indian politician)
- Pradeep Yadav (cricketer)
- Prithvirajsing Roopun (Pradeep Roopun)
- Pradeep Tamta
- Pradeep Singh Sihag
- Pradeep Shettar
- Pradeep Jaiswal
- Pradeep Palluruthy
- Nuwan Pradeep
- RJ Pradeep
- Pradeep Bhandari

== See also ==
- Pradeepa
