= 2018 Telangana T20 League =

- Dates: 3 February – 25 February 2018
- Administrator: Hyderabad Cricket Association (HYCA)
- Cricket format: Twenty20
- Tournament format(s): Round-robin and knockout
- Champions: Adilabad Tigers (1st title)
- Runners-up: Medak Mavericks
- Participants: 10
- Matches: 49
- Most runs: Danny Dereck Prince (485)
- Most wickets: Siddantham Praneeth Raj (20)
- Official website: www.hyderabad.cricket/TTL/

The 2018 season of the Telangana T20 League, also known as Venkataswamy T20 tournament, was the first edition of the TTL, a professional Twenty20 cricket league in Telangana, India. The league was formed by the Hyderabad Cricket Association (HYCA) in 2017. After Tamil Nadu and Karnataka, Telangana became third state in South India to launch its state T20 league with an initiative to provide major boost to rural cricketers who lag behind dur to lack of proper infrastructure and coaching facilities. The owners of the teams competing in the league are announced on 13 January 2018 by HYCA who have been selected on a first-come-first-serve basis after submitting an Expression of Interest and paying Rs 12.5 lakh each to HYCA for one-year contract. The team colours and logos were launched on 2 February 2018 with the inaugural match being held on 3 February at Rajiv Gandhi International Cricket Stadium, Hyderabad

Adilabad Tigers won the inaugural tournament beating Medak Mavericks by 9 runs and Hitesh Yadav was adjudged as the man of the match for the Final.

== Teams ==
Team	City	Captain
Hyderabad Thunderbolts	Hyderabad	Chandan Sahani
Adilabad Tigers	Adilabad	Neeraj Bist
Royals Mahabubnagar	Mahabubnagar	Aniketh Reddy
Kakatiya Kings	Warangal	Charan Teja
Medak Mavericks	Medak	Bavanaka Sandeep
Nizamabad Knights	Nizamabad	Anuraag Haridas
Nalgonda Lions	Nalgonda	Ashish Reddy
Karimnagar Warriors	Karimnagar	Amol Shinde
Khammam Tiraa	Khammam	Mukesh Gilda
Rangareddy Risers	Sangareddy	Akshath Reddy

== Tournament results ==
=== Points rable ===
- advanced to the knock-out stage

Team	Played	Won	Lost	Tie	NR	Points	NRR
Hyderabad Thunderbolts	9	8	1	0	0	16	+1.803
Rangareddy Risers	9	7	2	0	0	14	+1.017
Adilabad Tigers	9	6	3	0	0	12	+1.408
Medak Mavericks	9	6	3	0	0	12	+0.404
Nizamabad Knights	9	5	4	0	0	10	+0.956
Khammam Tiraa	9	5	4	0	0	10	-0.661
Nalgonda Lions	9	3	6	0	0	6	+0.076
Royals Mahabubnagar	9	3	6	0	0	6	-0.832
Karimnagar Warriors	9	2	7	0	0	4	-0.895
Kakatiya Kings	9	0	9	0	0	0	-3.38

Source:TTL Website

Hyderabad Thunderbolts along with Rangareddy Risers, Adilabad Tigers and Medak Mavericks moved into semifinals of Telangana T20 tournament.

=== Knockout stage ===
Match	Venue	Winner	Winning margin	Loser	Player of the match	Ref.
Semifinal-1	Rajiv Gandhi International Cricket Stadium, Hyderabad	Medak Mavericks; 151/4 (19 overs)	Won by 6 wickets	Hyderabad Thunderbolts; 150/7 (20 overs)		
Semifinal-2	Rajiv Gandhi International Cricket Stadium, Hyderabad	Adilabad Tigers; 182/7 (20 overs)	Won by 16 runs	Rangareddy Risers; 166/10 (19.2 overs)		
Third-Place Play-off	Rajiv Gandhi International Cricket Stadium, Hyderabad	Hyderabad Thunderbolts; 194/3 (20 overs)	Won by 1 run	Rangareddy Risers; 193/6 (20 overs)		
Final	Rajiv Gandhi International Cricket Stadium, Hyderabad	Adilabad Tigers; 148/7 (20 overs)	Won by 9 runs	Medak Mavericks; 139/5 (20 overs)	Hitesh Yadav	
