= Satwik =

Satwik is a given name. Notable people with the name include:

- Satwik Reddy (born 2002) Indian cricketer
- Satwiksairaj Rankireddy (born 2000), Indian badminton player
