= Pradeepa =

Pradeepa is a given name. Notable people with the name include:

- Pradeepa Dharmadasa (born 1964), Sri Lankan musician
- Pradeepa Herath (born 1976), Sri Lankan former sprinter

== See also ==
- Pradeep
