= Siddantham Praneeth Raj =

Indian cricketer

Personal information
- Full name: Siddantham Praneeth Raj
- Born: 3 June 1998 (age 28); Musheerabad, Hyderabad, India
- Batting: Right-handed
- Bowling: Right-arm medium
- Role: All-rounder

Domestic team information
- Years: Team
- 2022–23: Hyderabad
- FC debut: 24 January 2023 Hyderabad v Delhi
- Source: , 9 September 2025

Praneeth Raj in 2026

Siddantham Praneeth Raj (born 3 June 1998) is an Indian cricketer who has represented Hyderabad in the Ranji Trophy and across multiple age-group competitions. An all-rounder, he has played in the Cooch Behar Trophy (U-19), Col. C. K. Nayudu Trophy (U-23), Men’s Under-23 One Day Trophy, Vijay Hazare Trophy, Vizzy Trophy, and the inaugural 2018 Telangana T20 League. He was the leading wicket-taker in the 2018 Telangana T20 League and has also played league cricket in the United States.

== Early life ==
Siddantham Praneeth Raj was born on 3 June 1998 in Musheerabad, Hyderabad, India.

== Domestic career in India ==
=== Under-16 Career ===
In 2014, Praneeth Raj was selected from Telangana for the India Under-16 squad for the Coca-Cola Cup, a national-level tournament for age-group cricketers. The Coca-Cola XI was formed by choosing the top 15 performers out of 27 participants in an intensive U-16 camp, with the squad announced by Saba Karim, Anthony Adams, Sanjay Bhardwaj and Chetan Sharma. Selected players were eligible for a development opportunity in the United Kingdom.

A televised interview on T News (Telugu) also featured Praneeth Raj discussing his U-16 selection.

=== Under-19 Career ===
Praneeth Raj represented Hyderabad in the 2016–17 Cooch Behar Trophy, India’s Under-19 multi-day competition for state and zonal teams.

=== Under-23 Career ===
In October 2019, Praneeth Raj was selected for the Hyderabad Under-23 squad in the Men’s Under-23 One Day Trophy.

He was also part of Hyderabad’s squad in the 2019–20 Col. C. K. Nayudu Trophy, and named standby for the 2019–20 Vijay Hazare Trophy.

=== First-Class Career ===
Praneeth Raj made his first-class debut for Hyderabad against Delhi in the 2022–23 Ranji Trophy.

He scored 27 runs in the second innings.

=== Vizzy Trophy (2018) ===
In 2018, Praneeth Raj represented South Zone in the Vizzy Trophy, an inter-university competition organised under the aegis of the BCCI.

=== Telangana T20 League ===
Praneeth Raj was the leading wicket-taker in the inaugural 2018 Telangana T20 League, with 20 wickets.

V6 News (Telugu) reported his Man of the Match performance in one of the fixtures.

== League cricket in the United States ==
Praneeth Raj later played league cricket in the United States. In the North Texas Cricket Association he appeared for Elite Lions and Elite Bears, and in 2021–22 he represented the Dallas Xforia Giants in Minor League Cricket (United States).

== Career statistics ==
=== First-class ===
Format	Matches	Innings	Runs	HS	Bat Avg	Balls	Maidens	Wickets	Best Bowling	Bowl Avg	Econ
First-class	1	2	27	27	13.50	12	–	0	0/9	–	4.35
