= Tarani Sa =

Indian cricketer (born 1996)

Personal information
- Born: 14 September 1996 (age 30); Cuttack, Odisha, India
- Source: Cricinfo, 16 January 2021

Tarani Sa (born 14 September 1996) is an Indian cricketer. He made his Twenty20 debut on 16 January 2021, for Odisha in the 2020–21 Syed Mushtaq Ali Trophy. He made his List A debut on 28 February 2021, for Odisha in the 2020–21 Vijay Hazare Trophy.
