= Kaif Ahmed =

Indian cricketer (born 1997)

Personal information
- Born: 5 May 1997 (age 29); Purnia, Bihar, India
- Source: ESPNcricinfo, 10 January 2021

Kaif Ahmed (born 5 May 1997) is an Indian cricketer. He made his Twenty20 debut on 10 January 2021, for Bengal in the 2020–21 Syed Mushtaq Ali Trophy. He made his List A debut on 21 February 2021, for Bengal in the 2020–21 Vijay Hazare Trophy.
