= Nalin Mishra =

Indian cricketer (born 1995)

Personal information
- Full name: Nalin Rakesh Mishra
- Born: 20 December 1995 (age 30); Ghaziabad, Uttar Pradesh, India
- Batting: Right-handed
- Bowling: Right arm off break
- Source: ESPNcricinfo, 18 January 2021

Nalin Mishra (born 20 December 1995) is an Indian cricketer. He made his Twenty20 debut on 18 January 2021, for Uttar Pradesh in the 2020–21 Syed Mushtaq Ali Trophy.
