= Vineet Dhaka =

Indian cricketer (born 1996)

Personal information
- Born: 5 September 1996 (age 30)
- Source: Cricinfo, 14 January 2021

Vineet Dhaka (born 5 September 1996) is an Indian cricketer. He made his Twenty20 debut on 14 January 2021, for Railways in the 2020–21 Syed Mushtaq Ali Trophy.
