= RJ Pradeep =

Indian entertainer

Pradeep Sivalingam (born 1 August 1989), popularly known as RJ Pradeep, is an Indian radio jockey, presenter, vlogger and theatre actor based in Pondicherry officially known as Puducherry.

He has worked at Rainbow FM Chennai and Suryan FM 93.5 Pondicherry. He is best known as the host of the Suryan FM 93.5 Pondicherry shows Thillu Mullu (தில்லு முல்லு), Semma Ragalai (செம்ம ரகளை), Chinna thambi periya thambi (சின்ன தம்பி பெரிய தம்பி) and Semma Comedy Sir (செம காமெடி சார்).

Later Joined Radio Gilli 106.5 FM (Tamil Radio Channel in Dubai, frequency owned by of Umm Al Quwain Broadcast Network) and moved to Dubai in 2017. He is best known as the host of the Radio Gilli 106.5 FM shows TN 1065 and Neengathaan Kalling (நீங்கதான் கால்லிங்).

Pradeep Sivalingam along with Nivedita Karthikeyan (popularly known as RJ Nivi of Radio Gilli 106.5 FM) set a new Guinness world record, the longest marathon for a radio music show DJ – team is 106 hr and 50 mins and entered the Guinness Book of World Records. This was on Radio Gilli 106.5 FM, in Dubai, UAE live show from 7 to 11 May 2018 at Dubai Outlet Mall. The previous world record, held by a Swedish radio station, was 100 hours and two minutes.

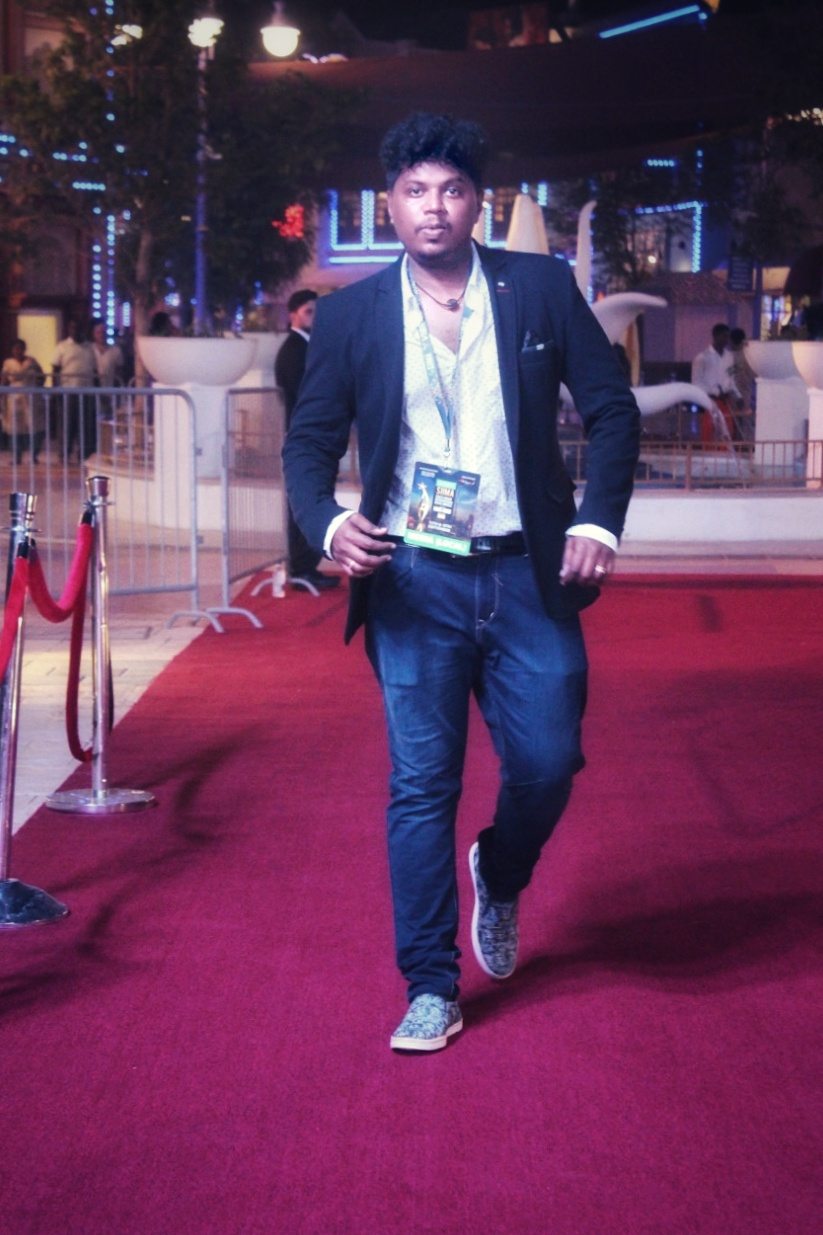
RJ Pradeep at SIMA awards 2018 Red Carpet
