= Sukesh Heera =

Indian cricketer (born 1998)

Personal information
- Full name: Sukesh Kumar Mantosh Heera
- Born: 11 December 1998 (age 27); Jaipur, Rajasthan, India
- Source: Cricinfo, 18 January 2021

Sukesh Heera (born 11 December 1998) is an Indian cricketer. He made his Twenty20 debut on 18 January 2021, for Odisha in the 2020–21 Syed Mushtaq Ali Trophy.
