= Badekkila Pradeep =

Indian actor

Badkila Pradeep
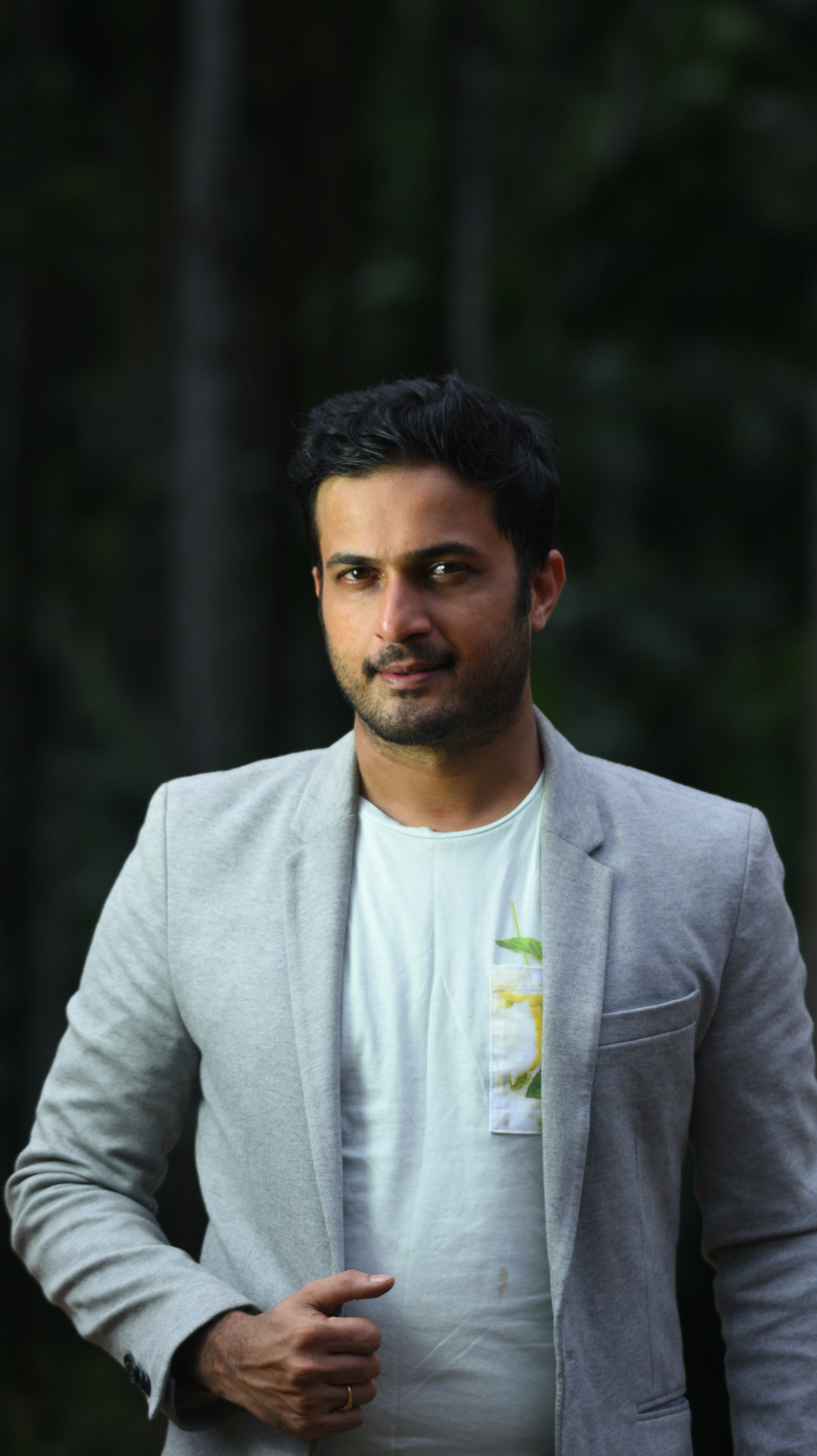
- Born: Krishna Pradeep; Puttur, Karnataka
- Occupations: Actor, journalist, radio personality voice acting, model
- Years active: 2005–present

Badekkila Pradeep is an Indian Television personality, best known for his Voice Overs in South India, especially the Kannada Television Industry. He is an actor, model, writer, lyricist and a podcaster, known for his Voice since 2005.

He is popularly known for his voice on Bigg Boss Kannada. He has been the voice of Colors Kannada, TV9 Kannada, Namma Metro and hundreds of commercials, documentaries and other works.

== Early life ==
Born in a village near Puttur, Badekkila belongs to a family of agriculturists. He is the place where he was born and brought up, while his early schooling happened in his village, he studied in various institutions in Mangalore, Mumbai before he began his career in media.

== Career ==
=== Voice artist ===
Badekkila has been the voice of various Kannada Television channels for more than 16 years now. He was first the voice of Star Suvarna, Zee Kannada and finally moved to Etv Kannada which is now Colors Kannada.

Pradeep has given the voice for various Kannada TV shows like Pyate Hudgeer halli Lifeu, Halli Haida Pyateg Banda, Pyate Mandi Kadig Bandru, Indian, Super Minute, Kannadada Kotyadhipati and the narrator voice on Bigg Boss Kannada ever since the beginning of the series.

He is also the English voice in Namma Metro, Bangalore. He has done thousands of voice overs in multiple languages like Kannada, English, Telugu, Hindi, Tamil and Tulu. Apart from Colors Kannada, his voice is heard on TV channels like TV9, Discovery (Kannada), National Geographic (Kannada)

=== Acting ===
He has acted in Kannada and Tamil serials, and also acted as a hero in a Kannada movie, Mirchi Mandakki Kadak Chai. He has been the face of many national TVCs for Colgate, Bru, Honda, Redbus, GRT and other brands. His role as Prem in Tamil serial Sondha Bandham on Sun TV gained him fame in Tamil Television industry.

=== Podcaster ===
Relax and Recharge on www.uvlisten.com are the two podcast shows Pradeep has been hosting since October, 2021. Both the shows have been gaining momentum ever since the launch, which are conceptualised and presented by him.

== Awards ==
- Srishti Kalaposhaka Award
- Chittara Award 2022

== Filmography ==
=== Television ===
Year	Title	Role	Network	Language
2006–2011	News	News presenter	TV9	Kannada
	Masale Mandakki	Host		Kannada
2011	Krishna Rukmini		Suvarna TV	Kannada
2012–2015	Sondha Bandham	Prem	Sun TV	Tamil
2012–2013	Super Kudumbam season 1 (talent show with Sondha Bandham team)	Himself	Sun TV	Tamil
2013–2014	Super Kudumbam season 2	Himself	Sun TV	Tamil
2013	Bharathi		Zee Kannada	Kannada
2016	Kalyanam Mudhal Kadhal Varai	Bijju	Vijay TV	Tamil

=== Film ===
Year	Title	Role	Language
2015	Mirchi Mandakki Kadak Chai	Mithun	Kannada
