= Vikash Vishal =

Indian cricketer (born 1999)

Personal information
- Born: 6 February 1999 (age 27); Ranchi, Jharkhand, India
- Source: Cricinfo, 16 January 2021

Vikash Vishal (born 6 February 1999) is an Indian cricketer. He made his Twenty20 debut on 16 January 2021, for Jharkhand in the 2020–21 Syed Mushtaq Ali Trophy. He made his first-class debut on 24 February 2022, for Jharkhand in the 2021–22 Ranji Trophy.
