= Erik Roy =

Indian cricketer (born 1999)

Personal information
- Full name: Erik Carfew Roy
- Born: 15 January 1999 (age 27); Guwahati, Assam, India
- Batting: Right-handed
- Role: Wicket-keeper

Domestic team information
- Years: Team
- 2020/21–present: Assam
- Source: ESPNcricinfo, 16 January 2021

Erik Roy (born 15 January 1999) is an Indian cricketer. He made his Twenty20 debut on 16 January 2021, for Assam in the 2020–21 Syed Mushtaq Ali Trophy.
