= Rajat Khan =

Indian cricketer (born 1996)

Personal information
- Full name: Rajat Julfikar Khan
- Born: 23 December 1996 (age 29); Tinsukia, Assam
- Batting: Left-handed
- Bowling: Right-arm offbreak

Domestic team information
- Years: Team
- 2017/18–present: Assam
- Source: Cricinfo, 17 November 2017

Rajat Khan (born 23 December 1996) is an Indian cricketer. He made his first-class debut for Assam in the 2017–18 Ranji Trophy on 17 November 2017.
