= Vinit Dhulap =

Indian cricketer (born 1989)

Personal information
- Born: 6 December 1989 (age 36)
- Source: Cricinfo, 25 November 2017

Vinit Dhulap (born 6 December 1989) is an Indian cricketer. He made his first-class debut for Railways in the 2017–18 Ranji Trophy on 25 November 2017.
