= Karan Thakur =

Indian cricketer (born 1992)

Personal information
- Born: 28 September 1992 (age 34); Manali, Himachal Pradesh, India
- Batting: Left-handed
- Bowling: Right-arm medium

Domestic team information
- Years: Team
- 2013: Baroda
- 2017–18: Railways
- Source: ESPNcricinfo, 27 October 2016

Karan Thakur (born 28 September 1992) is an Indian cricketer . In November 2013, at a BCCI under-25 match against Baroda at the Reliance Cricket Stadium, he took all 10 wickets in the innings.

He made his first-class debut for Railways in the 2016–17 Ranji Trophy on 27 October 2018. He made his List A debut for Railways in the 2017–18 Vijay Hazare Trophy on 10 February 2018.
