= Abhijeet Tomar =

Indian cricketer (born 1995)

Personal information
- Born: 14 March 1995 (age 31); Jaipur, Rajasthan, India
- Source: ESPNcricinfo, 8 January 2018

Abhijeet Tomar (born 14 March 1995) is an Indian cricketer from Jaipur, Rajasthan. He made his Twenty20 debut for Rajasthan in the 2017–18 Zonal T20 League on 8 January 2018. He made his List A debut for Rajasthan in the 2018–19 Vijay Hazare Trophy on 1 October 2018. On 8 December 2021, on the opening day of the 2021–22 Vijay Hazare Trophy, Tomar scored his first century in List A cricket, with 104 not out. In February 2022, he was bought by the Kolkata Knight Riders in the auction for the 2022 Indian Premier League tournament. More recently, Tomar was the highest run scorer of the 1st edition of Rajasthan Premier League conducted in July 2024.
