= Chirag Khurana =

Indian cricketer (born 1992)

Personal information
- Full name: Chirag Gulshan Khurana
- Born: 3 November 1992 (age 34); Kaithal, Haryana, India
- Batting: Right-handed
- Bowling: Right-arm off break
- Role: All-rounder

Domestic team information
- Years: Team
- 2008–2019/20: Maharashtra
- 2019/20: Kandy Customs
- 2021–present: Meghalaya

Career statistics
| Competition | FC | LA | T20 |
|---|---|---|---|
| Matches | 29 | 10 | 5 |
| Runs scored | 1,721 | 123 | 33 |
| Batting average | 41.97 | 12.30 | 16.50 |
| 100s/50s | 3/10 | 0/0 | 0/0 |
| Top score | 130* | 35 | 18* |
| Balls bowled | 3,793 | 332 | 72 |
| Wickets | 52 | 6 | 3 |
| Bowling average | 36.03 | 47.33 | 30.00 |
| 5 wickets in innings | 1 | 0 | 0 |
| 10 wickets in match | 0 | 0 | 0 |
| Best bowling | 5/70 | 2/40 | 2/27 |
| Catches/stumpings | 26/– | 4/– | 1/– |
- Source: ESPNcricinfo, 20 February 2015

Chirag Gulshan Khurana (born 3 November 1992) is an Indian cricketer who plays for Maharashtra cricket team in domestic cricket. He is an all-rounder who bats right-handed, and bowls right-arm off break.

He was the leading wicket-taker for Maharashtra in the 2017–18 Ranji Trophy, with 21 dismissals in five matches.
