= Sridhar Ashwath =

Indian cricketer (born 1993)

Personal information
- Born: 13 May 1993 (age 33); Madras, India
- Batting: Right handed
- Bowling: Right arm medium fast

Domestic team information
- Years: Team
- 2020–21: Pondicherry
- Source: Cricinfo, 27 February 2021

Sridhar Ashwath (born 13 May 1993) is an Indian cricketer. He made his List A debut on 27 February 2021, for Pondicherry in the 2020–21 Vijay Hazare Trophy.
