= Vineet Panwar =

Indian cricketer (born 1998)

Personal information
- Born: 28 June 1998 (age 28); Meerut, Uttar Pradesh, India
- Batting: Right-handed
- Bowling: Right-arm medium

Domestic team information
- Years: Team
- 2017/18–present: Uttar Pradesh

Career statistics
Competition	FC	T20
Matches	2	9
Runs scored	1	9
Batting average	1.00	9.00
100s/50s	0/0	0/0
Top score	1	9
Balls bowled	258	216
Wickets	1	12
Bowling average	102.00	23.66
5 wickets in innings	0	0
10 wickets in match	0	0
Best bowling	1/52	3/17
Catches/stumpings	0/–	7/–
- Source: Cricinfo, 24 January 2025

Vineet Panwar (born 28 June 1998) is an Indian cricketer. He made his first-class debut for Uttar Pradesh in the 2017–18 Ranji Trophy on 24 October 2017.
