= Walter Toppo =

Indian cricketer (born 1994)

Personal information
- Full name: Walter Sushil Toppo
- Born: 1 October 1994 (age 32); Sundargarh, Odisha, India
- Source: Cricinfo, 16 January 2021

Walter Toppo (born 1 October 1994) is an Indian cricketer. He made his Twenty20 debut on 16 January 2021, for Odisha in the 2020–21 Syed Mushtaq Ali Trophy.
