= Ashish Yadav (cricketer) =

Indian cricketer (born 1985)

Personal information
- Born: 1 September 1985 (age 41)
- Source: ESPNcricinfo, 6 October 2017

Ashish Yadav (born 1 September 1985) is an Indian cricketer. He made his first-class debut for Uttar Pradesh in the 2010–11 Ranji Trophy on 1 December 2010. He was the leading wicket-taker for Railways in the 2018–19 Vijay Hazare Trophy, with eleven dismissals in six matches.
