= Skalzang Kalyan =

Indian cricketer (born 1989)

Personal information
- Full name: Skalzang Dorjey Kalyan
- Born: 19 August 1989 (age 37); Tukla, Leh district, India (now Ladakh)
- Source: Cricinfo, 18 January 2021

Skalzang Dorjey Kalyan (born 19 August 1989) is an Indian cricketer. He made his Twenty20 debut on 18 January 2021, for Jammu & Kashmir in the 2020–21 Syed Mushtaq Ali Trophy. Dorjey Kalyan became the first player from Ladakh region to play in the national level domestic competition.
