= Yash Gupta =

Indian cricketer (born 1997)

Personal information
- Born: 1 December 1997 (age 28)
- Source: Cricinfo, 28 February 2021

Yash Gupta (born 1 December 1997) is an Indian cricketer. He made his List A debut on 28 February 2021, for Hyderabad in the 2020–21 Vijay Hazare Trophy.

Born to Ajay and Smita Gupta, Yash also has an older sister Akshitha Gupta, founder and owner of Urban Binge.
