= Parvez Sultan =

Indian cricketer (born 2003)

Pravez Sultan
Personal information
- Full name: Parvez Pinto Sultan
- Born: 18 July 2003 (age 23); Udaipur, Tripura
- Source: Cricinfo, 14 January 2021

Parvez Sultan (born 18 July 2003) is an Indian cricketer. He made his Twenty20 debut on 14 January 2021, for Tripura in the 2020–21 Syed Mushtaq Ali Trophy. He made his List A debut on 24 February 2021, for Tripura in the 2020–21 Vijay Hazare Trophy.
