= Metallurgical & Engineering Consultant Ltd Sail Stadium =

Stadium in India

MECON Sail Stadium
- Interactive map of MECON Sail Stadium
- Full name: Metallurgical & Engineering Consultant Ltd Sail Stadium
- Former names: Metallurgical & Engineering Consultant Ltd Sail Stadium
- Location: Ranchi, Jharkhand
- Coordinates: 23.335°N 85.309°E
- Owner: MECON
- Operator: MECON
- Capacity: 5,000

Construction
- Groundbreaking: 1984
- Opened: 1984

Website
- ESPNcricinfo

Metallurgical & Engineering Consultant Ltd Sail Stadium or MECON Sail Stadium is a multi purpose stadium in Ranchi, Jharkhand. The ground is mainly used for organizing matches of football, cricket and other sports. The stadium has hosted 18 first-class matches in 1984 when Bihar cricket team played against Orissa cricket team. The ground hosted 17 more first-class matches from 1986 to 2009. The stadium also hosted a List A matches when Bihar cricket team played against Bengal cricket team but since then the stadium has hosted non-first-class matches.

The stadium is owned and operated by MECON.
