= Abhishek Goswami =

Indian cricketer (born 1997)

Personal information
- Born: 6 November 1997 (age 29); Delhi, India
- Source: ESPNcricinfo, 9 November 2017

Abhishek Goswami (born 6 November 1997) is an Indian cricketer. He made his first-class debut for Uttar Pradesh in the 2017–18 Ranji Trophy on 9 November 2017.

In Dec 2014, Abhishek scored 255 runs (27 sixes and 18 fours) off 76 balls in the NIE Cremica Cup Interschool Tournament against Andhra Education Society, scoring the most runs by an Indian batsman in minor cricket in T20. Abhishek played for India under-19 Test matches against England in Feb 2017, which were held in Nagpur. He scored 66 and 58 runs in two matches respectively.

He made his List A debut for Uttar Pradesh in the 2018–19 Vijay Hazare Trophy on 28 September 2018. He made his Twenty20 debut on 16 January 2021, for Uttar Pradesh in the 2020–21 Syed Mushtaq Ali Trophy.
