= Kamrej =

- Suburb
- Location in Gujarat, India Kamrej (India)
- Coordinates: 21.13637°N 72.95718°E
- Country: India
- State: Gujarat
- City: Surat

Area
  - Total: 3 km^{2} (1.2 sq mi)

Population (2001)
  - Total: 12,746
  - Density: 4,200/km^{2} (11,000/sq mi)

Languages
  - Official: Gujarati, Hindi
- Time zone: UTC+5:30 (IST)
- Vehicle registration: GJ 05
- Website: gujaratindia.com

Kamrej is a Satellite Town of Surat City in Surat district in the state of Gujarat, India. Kamrej is a toll collection center on National Highway 8 from Mumbai to Delhi. Its location makes it known for fast food and dinners.

== Demographics ==
As of 2001 India census, Kamrej had a population of 12,746. Males constitute 57% of the population and females 43%. Kamrej has an average literacy rate of 71%, higher than the national average of 59.5%; with male literacy of 78% and female literacy of 62%. 14% of the population is under 6 years of age.

== Notable people ==
- Praful Pansheriya - Education Minister of Gujarat.
- Yash Shah - Indian Yogi & Contortionist.

== See also ==
- List of tourist attractions in Surat
