= Pradeep Yadav (cricketer) =

Indian cricketer (born 1996)

Personal information
- Born: 6 December 1996 (age 29); Sultanpur Uttar Pradesh
- Source: Cricinfo, 22 February 2021

Pradeep Yadav (born 6 December 1996) is an Indian cricketer. He made his List A debut on 22 February 2021, for Baroda in the 2020–21 Vijay Hazare Trophy.
