= Pithwala Stadium =

Cricket stadium

Pithawala Stadium
- Interactive map of Pithawala Stadium

Ground information
- Location: Surat, Gujarat
- Coordinates: 21.08366°N 72.73281°E
- Capacity: n/a
- Owner: Surat District Cricket Association
- Operator: Surat District Cricket Association
- Tenants: Gujarat cricket team

International information
- Only women's ODI: 22 December 2004: India v Australia
- As of 8 December 2019; Source: Ground info

Pithawala Stadium is a cricket stadium in Surat, Gujarat, India. The stadium has two Ranji Trophy matches in 1989 and 1992. The stadium hosted its first first-class match when Gujarat cricket team played against Baroda cricket team as match was drawn. Again in 1992 when Gujarat cricket team played against Baroda cricket team as match was won by Baroda by 195 runs.

In 2004, the stadium hosted a Women's One Day International when touring Australia women's national cricket team played against India women's national cricket team as Australia won by 32 runs.

Currently, The 2020–21 Vijay Hazare Trophy is the 19th season of the Vijay Hazare Trophy, a List A cricket tournament in India. It is being contested by 38 teams, divided into six groups, with six teams in Group A. Baroda, Chhattisgarh, Goa, Gujarat, Hyderabad and Tripura were placed in Group A, with all the matches taking place in Surat and Pithwala Stadium is one of the host of this tournament for Group A.

== See also ==
List of tourist attractions in Surat
