= Prateek Reddy =

Indian cricketer (born 2000)

Personal information
- Full name: Ananth Prateek Reddy
- Born: 28 November 2000 (age 25)

Domestic team information
- Years: Team
- 2020–present: Hyderabad

Career statistics
| Competition | FC |
|---|---|
| Matches | 6 |
| Runs scored | 213 |
| Batting average | 17.75 |
| 100s/50s | 0/1 |
| Top score | 83 |
| Catches/stumpings | 20/3 |
- Source: Cricinfo, 6 May 2020

Prateek Reddy (born 28 November 2000) is an Indian cricketer. He made his first-class debut on 12 February 2020, for Hyderabad in the 2019–20 Ranji Trophy. He made his List A debut on 20 February 2021, for Hyderabad in the 2020–21 Vijay Hazare Trophy.
