= JSCA International Stadium Complex =

International cricket stadium in Ranchi, Jharkhand, India

- Jharkhand States Cricket Association International Cricket Stadium
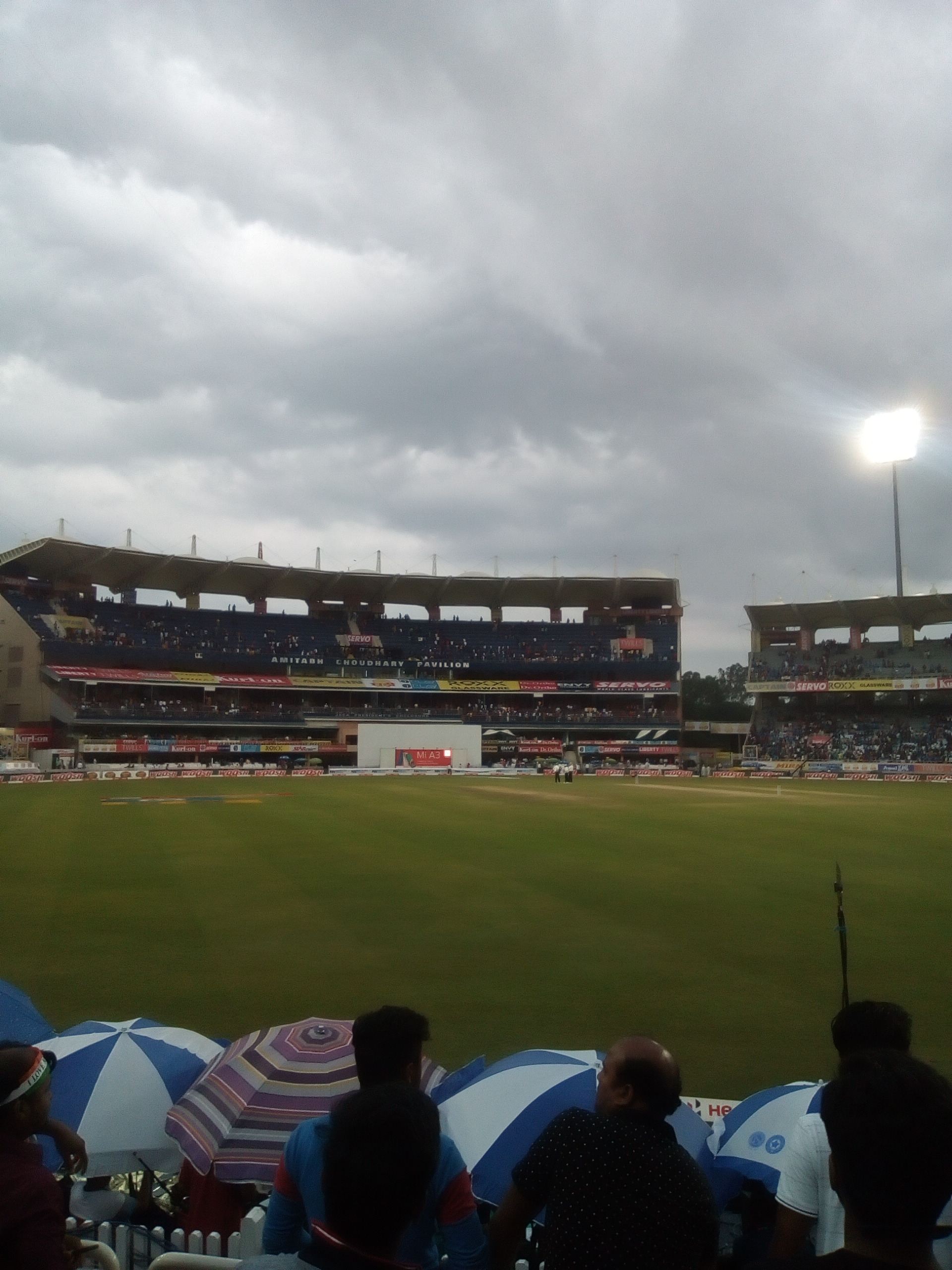
- Interactive map of JSCA International Stadium Complex

Ground information
- Location: Ranchi, Jharkhand, India
- Country: India
- Coordinates: 23°18′36″N 85°16′29″E
- Establishment: 2011
- Capacity: 40,000
- Owner: Jharkhand State Cricket Association
- Architect: Kothari Associates Pvt. Ltd.
- Operator: Jharkhand State Cricket Association
- Tenants: Indian Cricket Team; Jharkhand cricket team Kolkata Knight Riders; Chennai Super Kings
- End names
- M.S Dhoni Pavilion; Amitabh Choudhary Pavilion

International information
- First men's Test: 16–20 March 2017: India v Australia
- Last men's Test: 23–26 February 2024: India v England
- First men's ODI: 19 January 2013: India v England
- Last men's ODI: 30 November 2025: India v South Africa
- First men's T20I: 12 February 2016: India v Sri Lanka
- Last men's T20I: 9 October 2026: India v West Indies
- First women's ODI: 15 February 2016: India v Sri Lanka
- Last women's ODI: 19 February 2016: India v Sri Lanka
- First women's T20I: 22 February 2016: India v Sri Lanka
- Last women's T20I: 26 February 2016: India v Sri Lanka
- As of 11 October 2026; Source: Cricinfo

The JSCA International Stadium is an international cricket stadium under the Jharkhand State Cricket Association, located in Ranchi, Jharkhand, India. It is the home ground of the Jharkhand cricket team. Chennai Super Kings used to play their home matches at this stadium.

The JSCA International Stadium was inaugurated in January 2013. The first ODI match was played between India and England on 19 January 2013. The stadium has hosted 7 Indian Premier League matches so far.

== History ==
The JSCA's decision to build a new cricket stadium in Ranchi stemmed from a dispute with Tata Steel, regarding allocations of matches and conducting international matches in Keenan Stadium, Jamshedpur. This conflict came about when an international match between India and England was moved to Bangalore, with the JSCA stating they did not receive any response from Tata Steel. Following this, the JSCA decided a new stadium was needed. As Jharkhand State Cricket Association is a full member of the Board of Control for Cricket in India (BCCI), it organizes international matches in the state, but JSCA did not own any other international cricket stadiums, the only one being Keenan Stadium, which was owned by Tata Steel. Therefore, it was decided to construct its own International Cricket Stadium in Ranchi, the capital of Jharkhand.

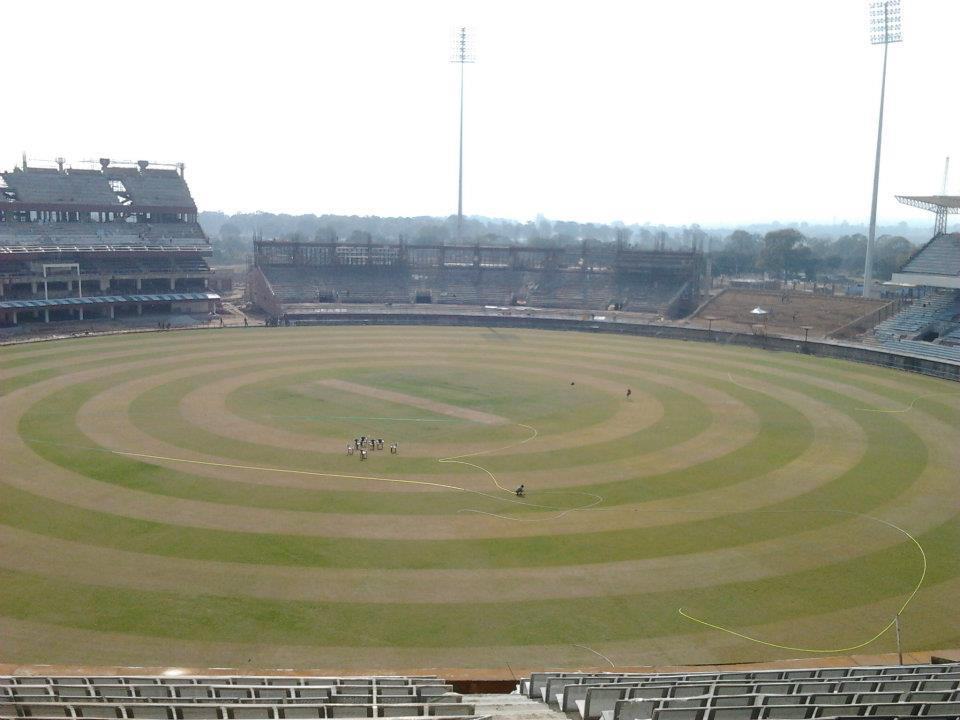
Stadium during construction.

The design commission was given to architectural consultants Kothari Associates Pvt. Ltd. of Delhi.

This stadium is built within the premises of HEC (Heavy Engineering Corporation), a public sector company. This stadium is the home ground of Indian Cricket Team's former skipper Mahendra Singh Dhoni. The stadium has been constructed in such a way that no shadow falls on any of the nine pitches before 4.45 pm, even on the shortest day of the year. There is another ground in the complex which has five pitches.

There is a practice arena with eight pitches. The stadium has a seating capacity of 50,000 and 76 corporate boxes. Spectators can also enjoy views from two nearby hills on the East and West Sides called the East and West Hills. This is the only stadium in the country having hills on both sides.

The two pavilions, North and South, are fully air-conditioned have five levels each which include VIP areas, members' enclosure, donors' enclosure, president's box, the BCCI box and two large dressing rooms with separate dining spaces for players. Membrane roofs provide shade from the sun. The Stadium also features an Indoor Cricket centre consisting of three indoor pitches, with a residential complex where players can stay for training.

In November 2015, the stadium was selected as one of the six new Test venues along with Maharashtra Cricket Association Stadium, Holkar Stadium, Saurashtra Cricket Association Stadium, Himachal Pradesh Cricket Association Stadium and Dr. Y.S. Rajasekhara Reddy ACA-VDCA Cricket Stadium in India.

== Project details ==
- Cost: ₹1.9 billion (US$20 million) to build
- Area: 130,000m^{2}
- Capacity: 40,000

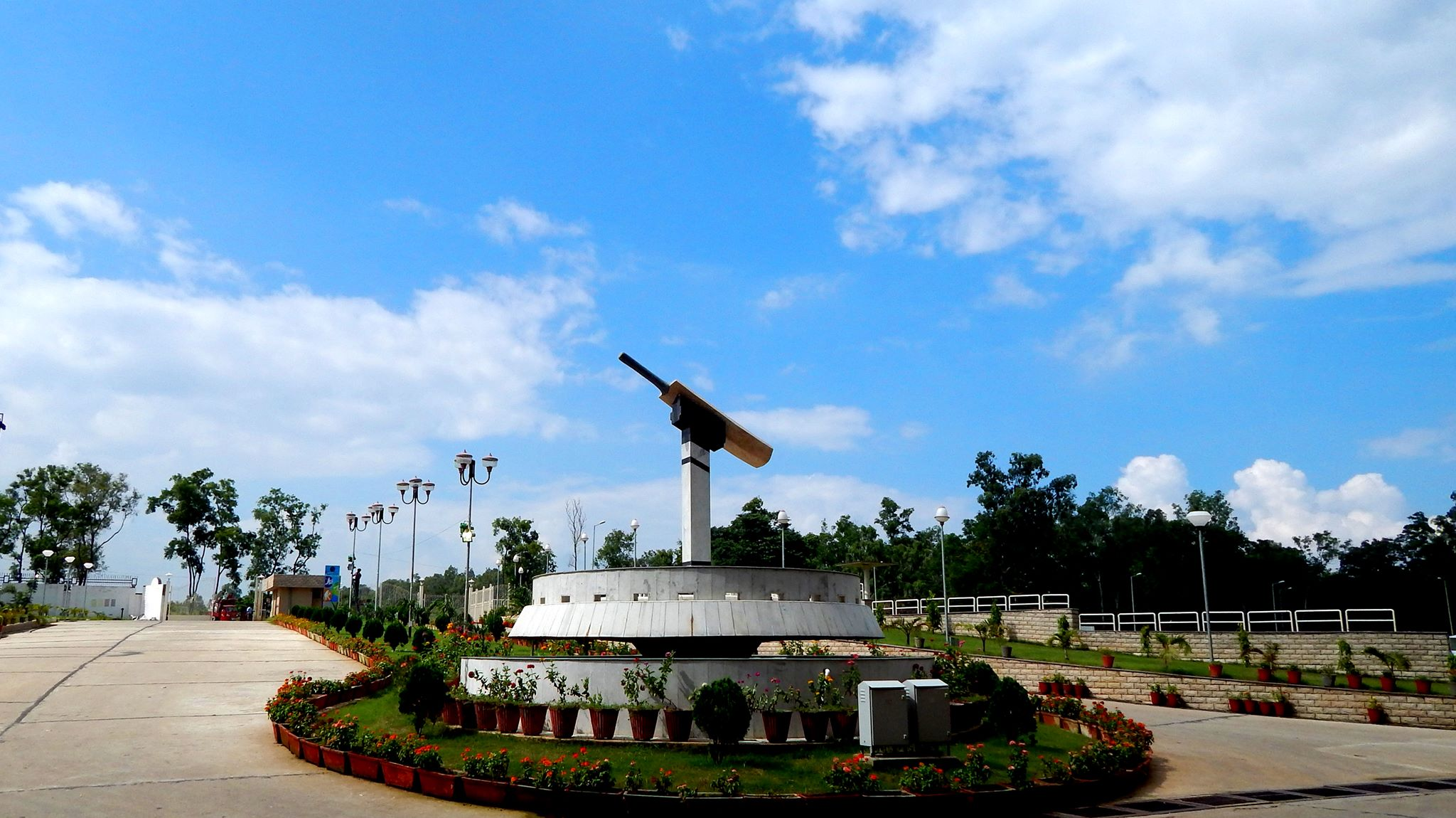
JSCA cricket stadium Entrance

The stadium was supposed to be completed in February 2012 at a cost of ₹ 1.80billion, covering an area of 35 acres (140,000 m^{2}). The stadium hosted its first international match on 19 January 2013 between India and England.

Earlier JSCA was hoping to get an International Match during West Indies/England's tour of India (2011). The stadium is built within the city limits of Ranchi. It is only 10-minute drive from the Ranchi airport Birsa Munda Airport and 25 minutes from a five-star hotel Hotel Radisson Blu. It is well connected by a four-lane road. It is also well connected to Ranchi junction and Hatia railway stations.

The JSCA Cricket Stadium project includes:

- A main 9-wicket match ground
- Adjacent practice ground with nets, for practice and smaller matches
- Practice arena of 8 pitches
- Spectator capacity for 40,000
- A members' pavilion and a media stand (250)
- Additional facilities for members including tennis and basketball courts, a swimming pool and spa
- 76 corporate hospitality boxes
- An indoor Cricket Academy with residential accommodation for youth training schemes
- 35 suites for guests

== List of centuries ==
=== Key ===
- * denotes that the batsman was not out.
- Inns. denotes the number of the innings in the match.
- Balls denotes the number of balls faced in an innings.
- NR denotes that the number of balls was not recorded.
- Parentheses next to the player's score denotes his century number at Edgbaston.
- The column title Date refers to the date the match started.
- The column title Result refers to the player's team result

=== Test centuries ===
No.	Score	Player	Team	Balls	In.	Opposing team	Date
1	178*	Steve Smith	Australia	361	1	India	16 March 2017
2	104	Glenn Maxwell	Australia	185	1	India	16 March 2017
3	202	Cheteshwar Pujara	India	525	2	Australia	16 March 2017
4	117	Wriddhiman Saha	India	233	2	Australia	16 March 2017
5	224	Rohit Sharma	India	255	1	South Africa	19 October 2019
6	115	Ajinkya Rahane	India	192	1	South Africa	19 October 2019
7	122*	Joe Root	England	274	1	India	23 February 2024

=== One Day Internationals ===
No.	Score	Player	Team	Balls	Inns.	Opposing team	Date	Result
1	139*	Angelo Mathews	Sri Lanka	116	1	India	16 November 2014	Lost
2	139*	Virat Kohli	India	126	2	Sri Lanka	16 November 2014	Won
3	104	Usman Khawaja	Australia	113	1	India	8 March 2019	Won
4	123	Virat Kohli	India	95	2	Australia	8 March 2019	Lost
5	113*	Shreyas Iyer	India	111	2	South Africa	9 October 2022	Won
6	135	Virat Kohli	India	120	1	South Africa	30 November 2025	Won

=== T20I Centuries ===
No.	Score	Player	Team	Balls	Inns.	Opposing team	Date	Result
1	102*	Shai Hope	West Indies	45	2	India	9 October 2026	Won

== List of five-wicket hauls ==
=== Key ===
Symbol	Meaning
†	The bowler was man of the match
‡	10 or more wickets taken in the match
§	One of two five-wicket hauls by the bowler in the match
Date	Day the Test started or ODI was held
Inn	Innings in which five-wicket haul was taken
Overs	Number of overs bowled.
Runs	Number of runs conceded
Wkts	Number of wickets taken
Econ	Runs conceded per over
Batsmen	Batsmen whose wickets were taken
Drawn	The match was drawn.

=== Tests ===
No.	Bowler	Date	Team	Opposing team	Inn	Overs	Runs	Wkts	Econ	Batsmen	Result
1	Ravindra Jadeja	16 March 2017	India	Australia	1	49.3	124	5	2.50	David Warner; Glenn Maxwell; Matthew Wade; Pat Cummins; Nathan Lyon	Drawn
2	Shoaib Bashir	23 February 2024	England	India	2	44	119	5	2.70	Shubman Gill; Rajat Patidar; Ravindra Jadeja; Yashasvi Jaiswal; Akash Deep	Lost
3	Ravichandran Ashwin	23 February 2024	India	England	3	15.5	51	5	3.20	Ben Duckett; Ollie Pope; Joe Root; Ben Foakes; James Anderson	Won
