= Ravi Chauhan =

Indian cricketer (born 1993)

Personal information
- Born: 17 September 1993 (age 33); New Delhi, India
- Batting: Right handed
- Bowling: Legbreak googly

Domestic team information
- Years: Team
- 2017–18: Services
- Source: Cricinfo, 11 October 2015

Ravi Chauhan (born 17 September 1993) is an Indian cricketer who plays for Services. He made his first-class debut on 1 October 2015 in the 2015–16 Ranji Trophy. He made his Twenty20 debut for Services in the 2016–17 Inter State Twenty-20 Tournament on 2 February 2017.

He was the leading run-scorer for Services in the 2017–18 Ranji Trophy, with 457 runs in six matches.

He made his List A debut for Services in the 2018–19 Vijay Hazare Trophy on 25 September 2018.
