= Swarab Sahani =

Indian cricketer (born 2002)

Personal information
- Full name: Swarab LT Sikandar Sahani
- Born: 20 November 2002 (age 23); Dharma Nagar, Maharashtra
- Batting: Left-handed
- Bowling: Slow left-arm orthodox
- Role: Bowler
- Source: Cricinfo, 22 February 2021

Swarab Sahani (born 20 November 2002) is an Indian cricketer. He made his List A debut on 20 February 2021, for Tripura in the 2020–21 Vijay Hazare Trophy.
