= Satwik Reddy =

Indian cricketer (born 2002)

Personal information
- Born: 12 January 2002 (age 24)
- Batting: Right-handed
- Bowling: Right-arm spin
- Source: Cricinfo, 28 February 2021

Sathwik Reddy (born 12 January 2002) is an Indian cricketer. He made his List A debut on 28 February 2021, for Hyderabad in the 2020–21 Vijay Hazare Trophy.
