= Rahul Singh (cricketer, born 1997) =

Indian cricketer (born 1997)

Personal information
- Full name: Rahul Singh
- Born: 13 September 1997 (age 29); Silchar, Assam, India
- Batting: Right-handed
- Bowling: Slow left-arm orthodox

Domestic team information
- Years: Team
- 2017–present: Assam
- Source: Cricinfo, 6 October 2017

Rahul Singh (born 13 September 1997) is an Indian cricketer. He is a slow left-arm orthodox bowler who plays for Assam.

He made his first-class debut for Assam in the 2017–18 Ranji Trophy on 6 October 2017. He made his List A debut for Assam in the 2017–18 Vijay Hazare Trophy on 14 February 2018. In August 2020, he was one of four cricketers from Assam to be selected as part of the 2020 Indian Premier League (IPL). He made his Twenty20 debut on 10 January 2021, for Assam in the 2020–21 Syed Mushtaq Ali Trophy.
