= Hitesh Yadav =

Indian cricketer (born 1999)

Personal information
- Born: 6 September 1999 (age 27)
- Source: ESPNcricinfo, 16 January 2021

Hitesh Yadav (born 6 September 1999) is an Indian cricketer. He made his Twenty20 debut on 16 January 2021, for Hyderabad in the 2020–21 Syed Mushtaq Ali Trophy.
