= Dhrushant Soni =

Indian cricketer (born 1995)

Personal information
- Born: 9 October 1995 (age 31)
- Source: ESPNcricinfo, 9 October 2019

Dhrushant Soni (born 9 October 1995) is an Indian cricketer. He made his List A debut on 9 October 2019, for Railways in the 2019–20 Vijay Hazare Trophy. He made his Twenty20 debut on 10 January 2021, for Railways in the 2020–21 Syed Mushtaq Ali Trophy.
