= Mickil Jaiswal =

Indian cricketer (born 1998)

Personal information
- Born: 10 May 1998 (age 26)
- Batting: Right-handed
- Bowling: Right-arm leg spin
- Role: All-rounder
- Source: ESPNcricinfo

Mickil Jaiswal (born 10 May 1998) is an Indian cricketer.

He made his Twenty20 debut on 12 January 2021, for Hyderabad in the 2020–21 Syed Mushtaq Ali Trophy. He made his List A debut on 20 February 2021, for Hyderabad in the 2020–21 Vijay Hazare Trophy. He made his first-class debut on 17 February 2022, for Hyderabad in the 2021–22 Ranji Trophy.
