= Eknath Kerkar =

Indian cricketer (born 1993)

Personal information
- Full name: Eknath Dinesh Kerkar
- Born: 10 September 1993 (age 32); Mumbai, Maharashtra, India
- Batting: Right-handed
- Role: Wicket-keeper batsman

Domestic team information
- Years: Team
- 2018 – 19: Mumbai
- 2021 – present: Goa
- Source: ESPNcricinfo, 30 January 2017

Eknath Dinesh Kerkar (born 10 September 1993) is an Indian cricketer. He played as Wicket-keeper. He previously played for Mumbai and currently plays for Goa.

He made his Twenty20 debut for Mumbai in the 2014–15 Syed Mushtaq Ali Trophy on 18 January 2016. He made his first-class debut for Mumbai in the 2018–19 Ranji Trophy on 14 December 2018. He made his List A debut on 20 February 2021, for Goa in the 2020–21 Vijay Hazare Trophy.
