= Shivam Chaudhary =

Indian cricketer (born 1997)

Personal information
- Full name: Shivam Chaudhary
- Born: 4 August 1997 (age 29); Meerut, Uttar Pradesh, India
- Batting: Right-handed
- Bowling: Right-arm off break

Domestic team information
- Years: Team
- 2015–2018: Uttar Pradesh
- 2021–present: Railways
- Source: ESPNcricinfo, 16 November 2016

Shivam Chaudhary (born 4 August 1997) is an Indian first-class cricketer who plays for Railways. He made his first-class debut for Uttar Pradesh in the 2014–15 Ranji Trophy on 6 February 2015. He made his Twenty20 debut for Uttar Pradesh in the 2016–17 Inter State Twenty-20 Tournament on 5 February 2017. He made his List A debut for Uttar Pradesh in the 2016–17 Vijay Hazare Trophy on 1 March 2017. He represented India under-23 in youth Asia cup held in Bangladesh.
