= Sankar Paul =

Indian cricketer (born 2000)

Personal information
- Full name: Sankar Shyam Paul
- Born: 15 November 2000 (age 25); Udaipur, Tripura, India
- Source: Cricinfo, 10 January 2021

Sankar Paul (born 15 November 2000) is an Indian cricketer. He made his Twenty20 debut on 10 January 2021, for Tripura in the 2020–21 Syed Mushtaq Ali Trophy. He made his List A debut on 20 February 2021, for Tripura in the 2020–21 Vijay Hazare Trophy. He made his first-class debut on 17 February 2022, for Tripura in the 2021–22 Ranji Trophy.
