= Ajay Dev Goud =

Indian cricketer (born 2000)

Personal information
- Full name: Ajay Dev Goud
- Born: 15 February 2000 (age 26)
- Batting: Right-handed
- Bowling: Right arm medium

Domestic team information
- Years: Team
- 2018–present: Hyderabad

Career statistics
Competition	FC	LA	T20
Matches	1	4	2
Runs scored	0	1	–
Batting average	–	1.00	–
100s/50s	0/0	0/0	–/–
Top score	0*	1*	–
Balls bowled	144	162	42
Wickets	1	4	5
Bowling average	84.00	33.00	9.00
5 wickets in innings	0	0	0
10 wickets in match	0	0	0
Best bowling	1/84	3/52	4/15
Catches/stumpings	1/–	1/–	0/–
- Source: ESPNcricinfo, 7 May 2020

Ajay Dev Goud (born 15 February 2000) is an Indian cricketer. He made his first-class debut for Hyderabad in the 2018–19 Ranji Trophy on 30 December 2018. He made his List A debut on 28 September 2019, for Hyderabad in the 2019–20 Vijay Hazare Trophy. He made his Twenty20 debut on 15 November 2019, for Hyderabad in the 2019–20 Syed Mushtaq Ali Trophy.
