= Dipayan Debbarma =

Indian cricketer (born 1999)

Personal information
- Full name: Dipayan Biswatosh Debbarma
- Born: 5 November 1999 (age 27); Agartala, Tripura
- Source: ESPNcricinfo, 16 January 2021

Dipayan Debbarma (born 5 November 1999) is an Indian cricketer. He made his Twenty20 debut on 16 January 2021, for Tripura in the 2020–21 Syed Mushtaq Ali Trophy. He made his List A debut on 20 February 2021, for Tripura in the 2020–21 Vijay Hazare Trophy.
