= Bavanaka Sandeep =

Indian cricketer (born 1992)

Personal information
- Full name: Bavanaka Parameswar Sandeep
- Born: 25 April 1992 (age 34); Hyderabad, India
- Batting: Left-handed
- Bowling: Slow left-arm orthodox

Domestic team information
- Years: Team
- 2010-present: Hyderabad

Career statistics
Competition	FC	LA	T20
Matches	58	48	38
Runs scored	3,631	1,343	734
Batting average	44.82	32.75	28.23
100s/50s	7/21	0/8	0/2
Top score	203*	96	74*
Balls bowled	1,487	783	321
Wickets	12	18	7
Bowling average	72.08	32.88	54.42
5 wickets in innings	0	1	0
10 wickets in match	0	0	0
Best bowling	4/57	5/26	2/14
Catches/stumpings	41/–	28/–	19/–
- Source: ESPNcricinfo, 6 May 2020

Bavanaka Parameswar Sandeep (born 25 April 1992) is an Indian first-class cricketer who plays for Hyderabad. Sandeep bats left-handed and bowls slow orthodox. He was the leading run-scorer for Hyderabad in the 2017–18 Ranji Trophy, with 400 runs in four matches.

In July 2018, he was named in the squad for India Red for the 2018–19 Duleep Trophy. In November 2018, he scored his 3,000th run in first-class cricket, batting for Hyderabad against Kerala in the 2018–19 Ranji Trophy.
