= 2022–23 Hyderabad C.A. season =

Hyderabad C.A.
2022–23 season
- Coach: Milap Mewada
- Captain: Tanmay Agarwal
- Ground(s): Rajiv Gandhi International Cricket Stadium
- Ranji Trophy: 32nd Elite Group (relegated)
- Vijay Hazare Trophy: 3rd Group A
- Syed Mushtaq Ali Trophy: 5th Group B
- Most runs: FC: Rohit Rayudu (575); LA: Rohit Rayudu (490); T20: Tilak Varma (297)
- Most wickets: FC: Kartikeya Kak (24); LA: Elligaram Sanketh (12); T20: Ravi Teja (10)

The 2022–23 season is Hyderabad cricket team's 89th competitive season. The Hyderabad cricket team is senior men's domestic cricket team based in the city of Hyderabad, India, run by the Hyderabad Cricket Association (HCA). They represent the state of Telangana in domestic competitions.

== Squad ==
=== Departures ===
Hanuma Vihari returned to the Andhra after playing one season for the Hyderabad.

=== Players ===
The following players made at least one appearance for Hyderabad in first-class, List A or Twenty20 cricket in 2022–23 season. Age given is at the start of Hyderabad's first match of the season (11 October 2022).
Players with international caps are listed in bold.

Name	Birth date	Batting style	Bowling style	Notes
Batsmen
Alankrit Agarwal	21 October 1999 (aged 22)	Right-handed	Right-arm off-break	**Twenty20** debut against Manipur (22 October 2022)
Tanmay Agarwal	3 May 1995 (aged 27)	Left-handed	Right-arm leg break	**Captain**
Jaweed Ali	15 December 1993 (aged 28)	Right-handed	Right-arm off break	
Rahul Buddhi	20 September 1997 (aged 25)	Left-handed	Right-arm off break	
Muthyala Charan	3 December 1999 (aged 22)	Right-handed	—	**Twenty20** debut against Punjab (11 October 2022)
T Santosh Goud	27 October 1999 (aged 22)	Right-handed	Right-arm off break	**List A** debut against Manipur (19 November 2022); **First Class** debut against Saurashtra (10 January 2023)
Prateek Pawar		Left-handed	Right-arm off-break	
Rohit Rayudu	29 July 1994 (aged 28)	Left-handed	Right-arm off break	
Abhirath Reddy	29 September 1996 (aged 26)	Right-handed	Right-arm leg break	**First Class** debut against Tamil Nadu (13 December 2022)
Jayram Reddy	26 April 1993 (aged 29)	Right-handed	Right-arm medium-fast	**Twenty20** debut against Goa (14 October 2022)
Mandadi Reddy	23 November 1999 (aged 22)	Right-handed	Right-arm leg break	
P Nitesh Reddy	28 November 2000 (aged 21)	Right-handed	Right-arm off-break	**Twenty20** debut against Puducherry (12 October 2022); **First Class** debut against Maharashtra (17 January 2023)
Samhith Reddy	23 November 1999 (aged 22)	Right-handed	Right-arm leg break	**First Class** debut against Assam (27 December 2022)
Shreyas Vala	20 February 1997 (aged 25)	Right-handed	Right-arm medium-fast	**Twenty20** debut against Tripura (16 October 2022)
Tilak Varma	8 November 2002 (aged 19)	Left-handed	Right-arm off break	Played for **Mumbai Indians** in 2023 Indian Premier League
All-rounders
Mickil Jaiswal	10 May 1998 (aged 24)	Right-handed	Right-arm leg break	
Rishith Reddy	29 November 2003 (aged 18)	Right-handed	Right-arm medium-fast	**Twenty20** debut against Manipur (22 October 2022); **List A** debut against Tripura (13 November 2022)
Chandan Sahani	29 January 1998 (aged 24)	Right-handed	Right-arm medium	
Ravi Teja	19 October 1994 (aged 27)	Left-handed	Right-arm medium-fast	Played for **South Zone** in 2022–23 Duleep Trophy
Tanay Thyagarajan	15 November 1995 (aged 26)	Left-handed	Slow left-arm orthodox	Played for **South Zone** in 2022–23 Duleep Trophy
Wicket-keepers
Dheeraj Goud	24 December 2004 (aged 17)	Right-handed	—	**List A** debut against Manipur (19 November 2022)
Rahul Radesh		Left-handed	—	**First Class** debut against Maharashtra (17 January 2023)
Pragnay Reddy	18 December 1999 (aged 22)	Right-handed	—	**First Class** debut against Andhra (3 January 2023)
Prateek Reddy	28 November 2000 (aged 21)	Right-handed	—	**Twenty20** debut against Punjab (11 October 2022)
Bhavesh Seth	7 October 1997 (aged 25)	Right-handed	—	**Twenty20** debut against Delhi (18 October 2022); **List A** debut against Himachal Pradesh (12 November 2022); **First Class** debut against Assam (27 December 2022)
Bowlers
Gangam Anikethreddy	28 October 2000 (aged 21)	Right-handed	Slow left-arm orthodox	**Twenty20** debut against Goa (14 October 2022); **List A** debut against Himachal Pradesh (12 November 2022)
Trishank Gupta	24 September 2001 (aged 21)	Right-handed	Right-arm leg-break	
Ajay Dev Goud	15 February 2000 (aged 22)	Right-handed	Right-arm medium-fast	
Kartikeya Kak	4 October 1996 (aged 26)	Right-handed	Right-arm medium-fast	**First Class** debut against Tamil Nadu (13 December 2022)
Abrar Mohiuddin	19 February 1995 (aged 27)	Right-handed	Right-arm medium-fast	**First Class** debut against Saurashtra (10 January 2023)
Chama Milind	4 September 1994 (aged 28)	Left-handed	Left-arm medium-fast	
B Punnaiah	12 May 2003 (aged 19)	Right-handed	Right-arm medium-fast	**Twenty20** debut against Punjab (11 October 2022); **List A** debut against Himachal Pradesh (12 November 2022)
Rakshann Readdi	29 September 2000 (aged 22)	Right-handed	Right-arm medium-fast	**Twenty20** debut against Punjab (11 October 2022)
Elligaram Sanketh	8 October 1999 (aged 23)	Left-handed	Left-arm medium-fast	**List A** debut against Himachal Pradesh (12 November 2022)
Mehrotra Shashank	6 December 2002 (aged 19)	Left-handed	Slow left-arm orthodox	**List A** debut against Manipur (19 November 2022); **First Class** debut against Mumbai (20 December 2022)
**Mohammed Siraj**	13 March 1994 (aged 28)	Right-handed	Right-arm medium-fast	Played for **Royal Challengers Bangalore** in 2023 Indian Premier League
Bhagath Varma	21 September 1998 (aged 24)	Right-handed	Right-arm off break	**Twenty20** debut against Puducherry (12 October 2022); **List A** debut against Manipur (19 November 2022); Played for **Chennai Super Kings** in 2023 Indian Premier League; **First Class** debut against Assam (27 December 2022)
Basettigari Vikram	30 August 1996 (aged 26)	Right-handed	Right-arm leg break	

== Competitions ==
=== Syed Mushtaq Ali Trophy ===
The Syed Mushtaq Ali Trophy, a Twenty20 cricket tournament in India, fixtures were announced by the Board of Control for Cricket in India (BCCI) on 8 August 2022 and the Hyderabad was placed in the Group B with all the group fixtures to be played in a bio-secure hub in Jaipur. On 6 October, the Hyderabad announced team for the tournament with Tanmay Agarwal as captain and Milap Mewada as coach.

==== Points table ====
Pos	Team	Pld	W	L	NR	Pts	NRR
1	Delhi	7	6	1	0	24	1.187
2	Punjab	7	6	1	0	24	2.838
3	Uttar Pradesh	7	4	3	0	16	0.546
4	Goa	7	4	3	0	16	0.061
5	Hyderabad	7	4	3	0	16	−0.167
6	Tripura	7	3	4	0	12	0.087
7	Manipur	7	1	6	0	4	−2.872
8	Pondicherry	7	0	7	0	0	−1.524

Updated to match(es) played on 22 October 2022. Source: ESPN Cricinfo

Advanced to Quarter-final
Advanced to Preliminary quarter-final

==== Matches ====
Group stage

11 October 2022	Punjab; 174/4 (20 overs)	v	Hyderabad; 115 (18.4 overs)	Punjab won by 59 runs
16:00 Round 1 Scorecard	Punjab; 174/4 (20 overs)	v	Hyderabad; 115 (18.4 overs)	Sawai Mansingh Stadium, Jaipur; Umpires: Vikas Lund and Mohamad Rafi
16:00 Round 1 Scorecard	Sanvir Singh 55* (19); Rakshann Readdi 2/53 (4 overs)		Tilak Varma 50 (38); Baltej Singh 3/22 (4 overs); Abhishek Sharma 3/22 (4 overs)	Sawai Mansingh Stadium, Jaipur; Umpires: Vikas Lund and Mohamad Rafi
Hyderabad won the toss and elected to field.; Gaurav Chaudhary, Ashwani Kumar (Punjab), Muthyala Charan, B Punnaiah, Rakshann Readdi and Prateek Reddy (Hyderabad) all made their T20 debuts.; Impact Player Subs: Ashwani Kumar for Abhishek Sharma (Punjab) and Muthyala Charan for B Punnaiah (Hyderabad).				Sawai Mansingh Stadium, Jaipur; Umpires: Vikas Lund and Mohamad Rafi

12 October 2022	Hyderabad; 147/8 (20 overs)	v	Puducherry; 143/4 (20 overs)	Hyderabad won by 4 runs
10:30 Round 2 Scorecard	Hyderabad; 147/8 (20 overs)	v	Puducherry; 143/4 (20 overs)	Sawai Mansingh Stadium, Jaipur; Umpires: Parashar Joshi and Vikas Lund
10:30 Round 2 Scorecard	Tilak Varma 57 (41); Bharat Sharma 4/18 (4 overs)		Ramachandran Ragupathy 35 (35); Bhagath Varma 1/11 (2 overs)	Sawai Mansingh Stadium, Jaipur; Umpires: Parashar Joshi and Vikas Lund
Puducherry won the toss and elected to field.; P Nitesh Reddy and Bhagath Varma (Hyderabad) both made their T20 debuts.; Impact Player Subs: B Punnaiah for Rahul Buddhi (Hyderabad) and Satish Jangir for Sagar Udeshi (Puducherry).				Sawai Mansingh Stadium, Jaipur; Umpires: Parashar Joshi and Vikas Lund

14 October 2022	Hyderabad; 177/6 (20 overs)	v	Goa; 140 (18.5 overs)	Hyderabad won by 37 runs
16:00 Round 3 Scorecard	Hyderabad; 177/6 (20 overs)	v	Goa; 140 (18.5 overs)	Sawai Mansingh Stadium, Jaipur; Umpires: Parashar Joshi and Belur Ravi
16:00 Round 3 Scorecard	Tilak Varma 62 (46); Arjun Tendulkar 4/10 (4 overs)		Aditya Kaushik 33 (22); Ravi Teja 4/20 (3.5 overs)	Sawai Mansingh Stadium, Jaipur; Umpires: Parashar Joshi and Belur Ravi
Goa won the toss and elected to field.; Gangam Anikethreddy and Jayram Reddy (Hyderabad) both made their T20 debuts.; Impact Player Subs: Trishank Gupta for Rahul Buddhi (Hyderabad) and Tunish Sawkar for Felix Alemao (Goa).				Sawai Mansingh Stadium, Jaipur; Umpires: Parashar Joshi and Belur Ravi

16 October 2022	Tripura; 158/8 (20 overs)	v	Hyderabad; 162/5 (20 overs)	Hyderabad won by 5 wickets
09:00 Round 4 Scorecard	Tripura; 158/8 (20 overs)	v	Hyderabad; 162/5 (20 overs)	KL Saini Ground, Jaipur; Umpires: Mohamad Rafi and Belur Ravi
09:00 Round 4 Scorecard	Bikramkumar Das 73 (56); Ravi Teja 2/27 (4 overs)		Tilak Varma 67 (46); Rana Dutta 1/18 (3 overs)	KL Saini Ground, Jaipur; Umpires: Mohamad Rafi and Belur Ravi
Hyderabad won the toss and elected to field.; Shreyas Vala (Hyderabad) made his T20 debut.; Impact Player Subs: Bhagath Varma for B Punnaiah (Hyderabad) and Sridam Paul for Bishal Ghosh (Tripura).				KL Saini Ground, Jaipur; Umpires: Mohamad Rafi and Belur Ravi

18 October 2022	Delhi; 196/6 (20 overs)	v	Hyderabad; 150 (19.1 overs)	Delhi won by 46 runs
13:30 Round 5 Scorecard	Delhi; 196/6 (20 overs)	v	Hyderabad; 150 (19.1 overs)	Jaipuria Vidyalaya Ground, Jaipur; Umpires: Parashar Joshi and Belur Ravi
13:30 Round 5 Scorecard	Yash Dhull 73 (36); Ravi Teja 3/54 (4 overs)		Rahul Buddhi 47 (35); Navdeep Saini 4/17 (3.1 overs)	Jaipuria Vidyalaya Ground, Jaipur; Umpires: Parashar Joshi and Belur Ravi
Hyderabad won the toss and elected to field.; Bhavesh Seth (Hyderabad) made his T20 debut.; Impact Player Sub: P Nitesh Reddy for B Punnaiah (Hyderabad).				Jaipuria Vidyalaya Ground, Jaipur; Umpires: Parashar Joshi and Belur Ravi

20 October 2022	Hyderabad; 132/9 (20 overs)	v	Uttar Pradesh; 133/3 (19.1 overs)	Uttar Pradesh won by 7 wickets
13:30 Round 6 Scorecard	Hyderabad; 132/9 (20 overs)	v	Uttar Pradesh; 133/3 (19.1 overs)	Jaipuria Vidyalaya Ground, Jaipur; Umpires: Parashar Joshi and Vikas Lund
13:30 Round 6 Scorecard	Tilak Varma 48 (37); Karan Sharma 3/19 (3 overs)		Aryan Juyal 71* (58); Trishank Gupta 2/23 (3.1 overs)	Jaipuria Vidyalaya Ground, Jaipur; Umpires: Parashar Joshi and Vikas Lund
Hyderabad won the toss and elected to bat.; Impact Player Sub: Dhruv Jurel for Kartik Tyagi (Uttar Pradesh) and Trishank Gupta for Ravi Teja (Hyderabad).				Jaipuria Vidyalaya Ground, Jaipur; Umpires: Parashar Joshi and Vikas Lund

22 October 2022	Manipur; 117/10 (19.5 overs)	v	Hyderabad; 120/0 (14.3 overs)	Hyderabad won by 10 wickets.
09:00 Round 7 Scorecard	Manipur; 117/10 (19.5 overs)	v	Hyderabad; 120/0 (14.3 overs)	Jaipuria Vidyalaya Ground, Jaipur; Umpires: Belur Ravi and Parashar Joshi
09:00 Round 7 Scorecard	Langlonyamba Keishangbam 49 (43); Elligaram Sanketh 3/19 (4 overs)		Rahul Buddhi 72* (51)	Jaipuria Vidyalaya Ground, Jaipur; Umpires: Belur Ravi and Parashar Joshi
Hyderabad won the toss and elected to field.; Alankrit Agarwal and Rishith Reddy (Hyderabad) made their T20 debuts.; Impact Player Sub: Rahul Buddhi for Elligaram Sanketh (Hyderabad) and Sultan Karim for Johnson Singh (Manipur).				Jaipuria Vidyalaya Ground, Jaipur; Umpires: Belur Ravi and Parashar Joshi

=== Vijay Hazare Trophy ===
The Vijay Hazare Trophy, a List A cricket tournament in India, fixtures were announced by the Board of Control for Cricket in India (BCCI) on 8 August 2022 and the Hyderabad was placed in the Group A with all the group fixtures to be played in New Delhi. On 6 November, the Hyderabad announced team for the tournament with Tanmay Agarwal as the captain.

==== Points table ====
Pos	Team	Pld	W	L	NR	Pts	NRR
1	Saurashtra	7	5	2	0	20	1.737
2	Uttar Pradesh	7	5	2	0	20	0.604
3	Hyderabad	7	5	2	0	20	0.513
4	Chandigarh	7	5	2	0	20	−0.031
5	Gujarat	7	3	4	0	12	0.162
6	Tripura	7	3	4	0	12	0.528
7	Himachal Pradesh	7	2	5	0	8	0.231
8	Manipur	7	0	7	0	0	−4.017

Source: ESPN Cricinfo
Rules for classification: 1) Points; 2) Head-to-head; 3) Net run rate.

Advances to Quarter-final
Advances to Preliminary quarter-final

==== Matches ====
Group stage

12 November 2022	Hyderabad; 360/3 (50 overs)	v	Himachal Pradesh; 335/9 (48 overs)	Hyderabad won by 17 runs (VJD method)
09:00 Round 1 Scorecard	Hyderabad; 360/3 (50 overs)	v	Himachal Pradesh; 335/9 (48 overs)	Palam A Stadium, Delhi; Umpires: Krishnaraj Srinath and Vinod Seshan
09:00 Round 1 Scorecard	Rohit Rayudu 156 (144); Vaibhav Arora 2/72 (10 overs)		Amit Kumar 103 (98); Elligaram Sanketh 3/54 (7 overs)	Palam A Stadium, Delhi; Umpires: Krishnaraj Srinath and Vinod Seshan
Himachal Pradesh won the toss and elected to field.; Himachal's innings was reduced to 48 overs and their target revised to 353 due to a wet outfield.; B Punnaiah, Bhavesh Seth, Gangam Anikethreddy and Elligaram Sanketh (Hyderabad) all made their List-A debuts.				Palam A Stadium, Delhi; Umpires: Krishnaraj Srinath and Vinod Seshan

13 November 2022	Hyderabad; 190 (46.1 overs)	v	Tripura; 191/3 (35 overs)	Tripura won by 7 wickets
09:00 Round 2 Scorecard	Hyderabad; 190 (46.1 overs)	v	Tripura; 191/3 (35 overs)	Palam A Stadium, Delhi; Umpires: Rajesh Timaney and Yeshwant Barde
09:00 Round 2 Scorecard	Ravi Teja 72 (92); Abhijit Sarkar 3/27 (7 overs)		Bishal Ghosh 102* (111); Elligaram Sanketh 2/41 (7 overs)	Palam A Stadium, Delhi; Umpires: Rajesh Timaney and Yeshwant Barde
Hyderabad won the toss and elected to bat.; Rishith Reddy (Hyderabad) all made his List-A debuts.				Palam A Stadium, Delhi; Umpires: Rajesh Timaney and Yeshwant Barde

15 November 2022	Saurashtra; 312/9 (50 overs)	v	Hyderabad; 314/5 (48.5 overs)	Hyderabad won by 5 wickets
09:00 Round 3 Scorecard	Saurashtra; 312/9 (50 overs)	v	Hyderabad; 314/5 (48.5 overs)	Arun Jaitley Stadium, Delhi; Umpires: Rohan Pandit and Vinod Seshan
09:00 Round 3 Scorecard	Harvik Desai 102 (120); Elligaram Sanketh 4/62 (8 overs)		Tanmay Agarwal 124 (119); Chetan Sakariya 2/48 (10 overs)	Arun Jaitley Stadium, Delhi; Umpires: Rohan Pandit and Vinod Seshan
Hyderabad won the toss and elected to field.				Arun Jaitley Stadium, Delhi; Umpires: Rohan Pandit and Vinod Seshan

17 November 2022	Hyderabad; 256/9 (50 overs)	v	Uttar Pradesh; 262/3 (48.4 overs)	Uttar Pradesh won by 7 wickets
09:00 Round 4 Scorecard	Hyderabad; 256/9 (50 overs)	v	Uttar Pradesh; 262/3 (48.4 overs)	Jamia Millia Islamia University Ground, Delhi; Umpires: Mohit Krishnadas and Jayaraman Madanagopal
09:00 Round 4 Scorecard	Mickil Jaiswal 73 (59); Shivam Mavi 3/52 (10 overs)		Aryan Juyal 100* (136); Rohit Rayudu 3/29 (8 overs)	Jamia Millia Islamia University Ground, Delhi; Umpires: Mohit Krishnadas and Jayaraman Madanagopal
Uttar Pradesh won the toss and elected to field.; Aaradhya Yadav (Uttar Pradesh) made his List A debut.; Player Replacement: Aryan Juyal for Aaradhya Yadav (Uttar Pradesh).				Jamia Millia Islamia University Ground, Delhi; Umpires: Mohit Krishnadas and Jayaraman Madanagopal

19 November 2022	Manipur; 191/8 (50 overs)	v	Hyderabad; 192/3 (28.1 overs)	Hyderabad won by 7 wickets
09:00 Round 5 Scorecard	Manipur; 191/8 (50 overs)	v	Hyderabad; 192/3 (28.1 overs)	Palam B Ground, Delhi; Umpires: Yeshwant Barde and Rajesh Timaney
09:00 Round 5 Scorecard	Bikash Singh 44* (37); Mehrotra Shashank 3/16 (10 overs)		Tilak Varma 126* (77); Rex Rajkumar 2/33 (7 overs)	Palam B Ground, Delhi; Umpires: Yeshwant Barde and Rajesh Timaney
Manipur won the toss and elected to bat.; Sanatombaroy Laiphangbam (Manipur), Dheeraj Goud, Bhagath Varma, Mehrotra Shashank, T Santosh Goud (Hyderabad) all made their List A debuts.				Palam B Ground, Delhi; Umpires: Yeshwant Barde and Rajesh Timaney

21 November 2022	Gujarat; 248/9 (50 overs)	v	Hyderabad; 251/6 (49 overs)	Hyderabad won by 7 wickets
09:00 Round 6 Scorecard	Gujarat; 248/9 (50 overs)	v	Hyderabad; 251/6 (49 overs)	Palam B Ground, Delhi; Umpires: Mohit Krishnadas and Yeshwant Barde
09:00 Round 6 Scorecard	Kathan Patel 109 (136); Elligaram Sanketh 3/39 (7 overs)		Rohit Rayudu 109 (125); Kathan Patel 2/43 (7 overs)	Palam B Ground, Delhi; Umpires: Mohit Krishnadas and Yeshwant Barde
Hyderabad won the toss and elected to field.				Palam B Ground, Delhi; Umpires: Mohit Krishnadas and Yeshwant Barde

23 November 2022	Hyderabad; 306/5 (50 overs)	v	Chandigarh; 196 (46.3 overs)	Hyderabad won by 110 runs
09:00 Round 7 Scorecard	Hyderabad; 306/5 (50 overs)	v	Chandigarh; 196 (46.3 overs)	Jamia Millia Islamia University Ground, Delhi; Umpires: Krishnaraj Srinath and Vinod Seshan
09:00 Round 7 Scorecard	Bhavesh Seth 71 (60); Arpit Pannu 2/53 (10 overs)		Gurinder Singh 59 (81); Gangam Anikethreddy 3/21 (8.3 overs)	Jamia Millia Islamia University Ground, Delhi; Umpires: Krishnaraj Srinath and Vinod Seshan
Chandigarh won the toss and elected to field.				Jamia Millia Islamia University Ground, Delhi; Umpires: Krishnaraj Srinath and Vinod Seshan

=== Ranji Trophy ===
The Vijay Hazare Trophy, a List A cricket tournament in India, fixtures were announced by the Board of Control for Cricket in India (BCCI) on 8 August 2022 and the Hyderabad was placed in the Group B with all the group fixtures to be played in New Delhi. On 10 December, the Hyderabad announced team for the tournament with Tanmay Agarwal as the captain.

==== Points table ====
Pos	Team	Pld	W	L	T	D	NR	Pts	Quot
1	Saurashtra	7	3	2	0	2	0	26	1.277
2	Andhra	7	4	2	0	1	0	26	1.119
3	Maharashtra	7	3	0	0	4	0	26	1.345
4	Mumbai	7	3	2	0	2	0	24	1.533
5	Tamil Nadu	7	2	1	0	4	0	21	1.225
6	Delhi	7	2	2	0	3	0	17	0.902
7	Assam	7	1	3	0	3	0	11	0.546
8	Hyderabad	7	0	6	0	1	0	1	0.523

Updated to match(es) played on 27 January 2023. Source: ESPN Cricinfo

Advances to Quarter-final Relegated to Plate Group for next season

==== Matches ====
Group stage

13–16 December 2022	Hyderabad	v	Tamil Nadu	Match drawn
Round 1 Scorecard	395 (115 overs); Mickil Jaiswal 137* (193); Sandeep Warrier 5/83 (29 overs)		510/4d (111.5 overs); Sai Sudharsan 179 (273); Tanay Thyagarajan 2/106 (25 overs)	Rajiv Gandhi International Cricket Stadium, Hyderabad; Umpires: Anil Chaudhary and Tapan Sharma; Player of the match: Sai Sudharsan (Tamil Nadu)
Round 1 Scorecard	258 (85 overs); Tanay Thyagarajan 69 (137); Ravisrinivasan Sai Kishore 5/101 (28 overs)		108/1 (7 overs); Narayan Jagadeesan 59* (22); Kartikeya Kak 1/41 (3 overs)	Rajiv Gandhi International Cricket Stadium, Hyderabad; Umpires: Anil Chaudhary and Tapan Sharma; Player of the match: Sai Sudharsan (Tamil Nadu)
Tamil Nadu won the toss and elected to field.; Kartikeya Kak, Abhirath Reddy (Hyderabad), Sai Sudharsan and R Kavin (Tamil Nadu) all made their first-class debuts.

20–23 December 2022	Mumbai	v	Hyderabad	Mumbai won by an innings and 217 runs
Round 2 Scorecard	651/6d (127.2 overs); Ajinkya Rahane 204 (261); Kartikeya Kak 3/106 (19.2 overs)		214 (65.1 overs); Rohit Rayudu 77 (151); Shams Mulani 7/94 (26.1 overs)	Bandra Kurla Complex Ground, Mumbai; Umpires: Jayaraman Madanagopal and Nitin Pandit; Player of the match: Shams Mulani (Mumbai)
Round 2 Scorecard			220 (67.2 overs) (f/o); Rahul Buddhi 65 (97); Tanush Kotian 5/82 (22.2 overs)	Bandra Kurla Complex Ground, Mumbai; Umpires: Jayaraman Madanagopal and Nitin Pandit; Player of the match: Shams Mulani (Mumbai)
Hyderabad won the toss and elected to field.; Mehrotra Shashank (Hyderabad) made his first-class debut.

27–30 December 2022	Assam	v	Hyderabad	Assam won by 18 runs
Round 3 Scorecard	205 (56.4 overs); Swarupam Purkayastha 83 (88); Ravi Teja 4/53 (16 overs)		208 (66.5 overs); Rohit Rayudu 60 (169); Riyan Parag 4/48 (20 overs)	Rajiv Gandhi International Stadium, Hyderabad; Umpires: Mohit Krishnadas and Jayaraman Madanagopal; Player of the match: Riyan Parag (Assam)
Round 3 Scorecard	252 (75.2 overs); Riyan Parag 78 (28); Ravi Teja 5/50 (15.2 overs)		231 (61.5 overs); Tanmay Agarwal 126* (158); Riyan Parag 4/93 (25.5 overs)	Rajiv Gandhi International Stadium, Hyderabad; Umpires: Mohit Krishnadas and Jayaraman Madanagopal; Player of the match: Riyan Parag (Assam)
Hyderabad won the toss and elected to field.; Samhith Reddy, Bhavesh Seth and Bhagath Varma (Hyderabad) all made their first-class debuts.

3–6 January 2023	Andhra	v	Hyderabad	Andhra won by 154 runs
Round 4 Scorecard	135 (51.1 overs); Abhishek Reddy 81 (145); Ravi Teja 5/34 (16 overs)		197 (63.1 overs); Mehrotra Shashank 47 (55); Nitish Kumar Reddy 4/64 (19 overs)	Dr PVG Raju ACA Sports Complex, Vizianagaram; Umpires: Manish Jain and Nagaraj Ramesh; Player of the match: Ricky Bhui (Andhra)
Round 4 Scorecard	462 (107.3 overs); Ricky Bhui 116 (150); Rakshan Readdi 3/120 (30 overs)		246 (73.3 overs); Chandan Sahani 56 (87); K. V. Sasikanth 5/68 (23 overs)	Dr PVG Raju ACA Sports Complex, Vizianagaram; Umpires: Manish Jain and Nagaraj Ramesh; Player of the match: Ricky Bhui (Andhra)
Hyderabad won the toss and elected to field.; Kodavandla Sudharsan (Andhra) and Pragnay Reddy (Hyderabad) both made their first-class debuts.

10–13 January 2023	Hyderabad	v	Saurashtra	Saurashtra won by an innings and 57 runs
Round 5 Scorecard	79 (30.5 overs); Rohit Rayudu 23 (72); Dharmendrasinh Jadeja 3/8 (3.5 overs)		327 (68.3 overs); Harvik Desai 81 (108); Gangam Anikethreddy 7/95 (25.3 overs)	Gymkhana Ground, Hyderabad; Umpires: Akshay Marathe and Navdeep Singh
Round 5 Scorecard	191 (46.4 overs); T Santosh Goud 58 (125); Dharmendrasinh Jadeja 4/34 (14.4 overs)			Gymkhana Ground, Hyderabad; Umpires: Akshay Marathe and Navdeep Singh
Hyderabad won the toss and elected to bat.; T Santosh Goud and Abrar Mohiuddin (Hyderabad) both made their first-class debuts.

17–20 January 2023	Maharashtra	v	Hyderabad	Maharashtra won by 9 wickets
Round 6 Scorecard	385 (96.2 overs); Naushad Shaikh 152 (241); Kartikeya Kak 7/91 (24 overs)		192 (86.3 overs); Rohit Rayudu 68 (186); Ashay Palkar 3/26 (15.3 overs)	Maharashtra Cricket Association Stadium, Pune; Umpires: C. K. Nandan and Nikhil Patwardhan; Player of the match: Naushad Shaikh (Maharashtra)
Round 6 Scorecard	30/1 (2.5 overs); Taranjit Singh 30* (15); Kartikeya Kak 1/25 (1.5 overs)		219 (53.1 overs) (f/o); Chandan Sahani 59 (46); Satyajeet Bachhav 3/32 (7.1 overs)	Maharashtra Cricket Association Stadium, Pune; Umpires: C. K. Nandan and Nikhil Patwardhan; Player of the match: Naushad Shaikh (Maharashtra)
Hyderabad won the toss and elected to field.; P Nitesh Reddy and Rahul Radesh (Hyderabad) both made their first-class debuts.

24–27 January 2023	Hyderabad	v	Delhi	Delhi won by 9 wickets
Round 7 Scorecard	355 (124 overs); Rohit Rayudu 153* (295); Divij Mehra 3/45 (24 overs)		433 (100.5 overs); Ayush Badoni 191 (230); Gangam Anikethreddy 5/143 (34 overs)	Rajiv Gandhi International Stadium, Hyderabad; Umpires: Ranjeev Sharma and Sadashiv Iyer; Player of the match: Harshit Rana (Delhi)
Round 7 Scorecard	124 (37.4 overs); Rohit Rayudu 32 (77); Harshit Rana 7/45 (12 overs)		47/1 (8.4 overs); Dhruv Shorey 23* (26); Kartikeya Kak 1/26 (4.4 overs)	Rajiv Gandhi International Stadium, Hyderabad; Umpires: Ranjeev Sharma and Sadashiv Iyer; Player of the match: Harshit Rana (Delhi)
Hyderabad won the toss and elected to bat.; Shashank Lokesh and Praneeth Raj (Hyderabad) both made their first-class debuts.
