= 2022–23 Vijay Hazare Trophy Group A =

Cricket tournament

- Dates: 12 November – 2 December 2022
- Administrator(s): BCCI
- Cricket format: List A cricket
- Tournament format(s): Round-robin
- Participants: 8

The 2022–23 Vijay Hazare Trophy is the twenty first season of the Vijay Hazare Trophy, a List A cricket tournament that is being played in India. It was contested by 38 teams, divided into five groups, with eight teams in Group A. The tournament was announced by the BCCI on 8 August 2022.

== Points table ==
Pos	Team	Pld	W	L	NR	Pts	NRR
1	Saurashtra	7	5	2	0	20	1.737
2	Uttar Pradesh	7	5	2	0	20	0.604
3	Hyderabad	7	5	2	0	20	0.513
4	Chandigarh	7	5	2	0	20	−0.031
5	Gujarat	7	3	4	0	12	0.162
6	Tripura	7	3	4	0	12	0.528
7	Himachal Pradesh	7	2	5	0	8	0.231
8	Manipur	7	0	7	0	0	−4.017

Source: ESPN Cricinfo
Rules for classification: 1) Points; 2) Head-to-head; 3) Net run rate.

Advances to Quarter-final
Advances to Preliminary quarter-final

== Fixtures ==
=== Round 1 ===
12 November 2022
Scorecard

Chandigarh; 215/9 (50 overs)	v	Saurashtra; 216/3 (44.1 overs)
Jagjit Singh 47 (17); Prerak Mankad 2/17 (8 overs)		Harvik Desai 68 (97); Rohit Dhanda 1/31 (7 overs)

Saurashtra won by 7 wickets
Jamia Millia Islamia University Ground, Delhi
Umpires: Rohan Pandit and Rajesh Timaney

- Saurashtra won the toss and elected to field.
- Rohit Dhanda and Akshit Rana (Chandigarh) both made their List A debuts.

12 November 2022
Scorecard

Uttar Pradesh; 242 (50 overs)	v	Tripura; 159 (40.3 overs)
Rinku Singh 82 (94); Rana Dutta 4/51 (9 overs)		Bikramkumar Das 51 (60); Prince Yadav 3/18 (5 overs)

Uttar Pradesh won by 83 runs
Palam B Ground, Delhi
Umpires: Mohit Krishnadas and Jayaraman Madanagopal

- Tripura won the toss and elected to field.
- Prince Yadav (Uttar Pradesh) and Deepak Khatri (Tripura) both made their List A debuts.

12 November 2022
Scorecard

Hyderabad; 360/3 (50 overs)	v	Himachal Pradesh; 335/9 (48 overs)
Rohit Rayudu 156 (144); Vaibhav Arora 2/72 (10 overs)		Amit Kumar 103 (98); Elligaram Sanketh 3/54 (7 overs)

Hyderabad won by 17 runs (VJD method)
Palam A Stadium, Delhi
Umpires: Vinod Seshan and Krishnaraj Srinath

- Himachal Pradesh won the toss and elected to field.
- Himachal Pradesh were set a revised target of 353 runs from 48 overs due to rain.
- Gangam Anikethreddy, B Punnaiah, Elligaram Sanketh and Bhavesh Seth (Hyderabad) all made their List A debuts.

12 November 2022
Scorecard

Gujarat; 337/6 (50 overs)	v	Manipur; 185/9 (50 overs)
Priyank Panchal 136 (136); Rex Rajkumar 3/59 (9 overs)		Langlonyamba Keishangbam 45 (61); Siddharth Desai 3/20 (10 overs)

Gujarat won by 152 runs
Arun Jaitley Stadium, Delhi
Umpires: Yeshwant Barde and Tapan Sharma

- Manipur won the toss and elected to field.
- Bikash Singh and Pheiroijam Singh (Manipur) both made their List A debuts.

=== Round 2 ===
13 November 2022
Scorecard

Saurashtra; 397/4 (50 overs)	v	Manipur; 115 (41.4 overs)
Samarth Vyas 200 (131); Pheiroijam Singh 1/48 (5 overs)		Langlonyamba Keishangbam 55 (107); Dharmendrasinh Jadeja 7/10 (10 overs)

Saurashtra won by 282 runs
Jamia Millia Islamia University Ground, Delhi
Umpires: Mohit Krishnadas and Rohan Pandit

- Manipur won the toss and elected to field.
- Samarth Vyas (Saurashtra) scored his maiden double century in List A cricket.

13 November 2022
Scorecard

Uttar Pradesh; 139 (41.3 overs)	v	Himachal Pradesh; 140/5 (36 overs)
Saurabh Kumar 35 (63); Rishi Dhawan 4/12 (6.3 overs)		Raghav Dhawan 61* (117); Shivam Mavi 2/23 (8 overs)

Himachal Pradesh won by 5 wickets
Palam B Ground, Delhi
Umpires: Jayaraman Madanagopal and Vinod Seshan

- Himachal Pradesh won the toss and elected to field.

13 November 2022
Scorecard

Hyderabad; 190 (46.1 overs)	v	Tripura; 191/3 (35 overs)
Ravi Teja 72 (92); Abhijit Sarkar 3/27 (7 overs)		Bishal Ghosh 102* (111); Elligaram Sanketh 2/41 (7 overs)

Tripura won by 7 wickets
Palam A Stadium, Delhi
Umpires: Yeshwant Barde and Rajesh Timaney

- Hyderabad won the toss and elected to bat.
- Rishith Reddy (Hyderabad) made his List A debut.

13 November 2022
Scorecard

Gujarat; 281/6 (50 overs)	v	Chandigarh; 284/4 (48.5 overs)
Priyank Panchal 100 (114); Jagjit Singh 3/64 (10 overs)		Manan Vohra 116 (132); Siddharth Desai 2/51 (10 overs)

Chandigarh won by 6 wickets
Arun Jaitley Stadium, Delhi
Umpires: Tapan Sharma and Krishnaraj Srinath

- Chandigarh won the toss and elected to field.
- Shen Patel (Gujarat) made his List A debut.

=== Round 3 ===
15 November 2022
Scorecard

Gujarat; 195/9 (50 overs)	v	Uttar Pradesh; 197/4 (47 overs)
Bhargav Merai 61 (99); Ankit Rajpoot 4/30 (10 overs)		Rinku Singh 68* (86); Chintan Gaja 1/28 (9 overs)

Uttar Pradesh won by 6 wickets
Jamia Millia Islamia University Ground, Delhi
Umpires: Jayaraman Madanagopal and Tapan Sharma

- Uttar Pradesh won the toss and elected to field.

15 November 2022
Scorecard

Chandigarh; 255/6 (50 overs)	v	Tripura; 251/9 (50 overs)
Shivam Bhambri 59 (92); Chiranjit Paul 2/31 (6 overs)		Wriddhiman Saha 101 (106); Rohit Dhanda 5/68 (10 overs)

Chandigarh won by 4 runs
Palam B Ground, Delhi
Umpires: Yeshwant Barde and Mohit Krishnadas

- Tripura won the toss and elected to field.

15 November 2022
Scorecard

Himachal Pradesh; 362/4 (50 overs)	v	Manipur; 163/8 (50 overs)
Shubham Arora 133 (127); Bikash Singh 3/75 (10 overs)		Rex Rajkumar 36 (43); Akash Vasisht 2/24 (10 overs)

Himachal Pradesh won by 199 runs
Palam A Stadium, Delhi
Umpires: Krishnaraj Srinath and Rajesh Timaney

- Manipur won the toss and elected to field.
- Amom Singh (Manipur) made his List A debut.

15 November 2022
Scorecard

Saurashtra; 312/9 (50 overs)	v	Hyderabad; 314/5 (48.5 overs)
Harvik Desai 102 (120); Elligaram Sanketh 4/62 (8 overs)		Tanmay Agarwal 124 (119); Chetan Sakariya 2/48 (10 overs)

Hyderabad won by 5 wickets
Arun Jaitley Stadium, Delhi
Umpires: Rohan Pandit and Vinod Seshan

- Hyderabad won the toss and elected to field.

=== Round 4 ===
17 November 2022
Scorecard

Hyderabad; 256/9 (50 overs)	v	Uttar Pradesh; 262/3 (48.4 overs)
Mickil Jaiswal 73 (59); Shivam Mavi 3/52 (10 overs)		Aryan Juyal 100* (136); Rohit Rayudu 3/29 (8 overs)

Uttar Pradesh won by 7 wickets
Jamia Millia Islamia University Ground, Delhi
Umpires: Mohit Krishnadas and Jayaraman Madanagopal

- Uttar Pradesh won the toss and elected to field.
- Aaradhya Yadav (Uttar Pradesh) made his List A debut.
- Player Replacement: Aryan Juyal for Aaradhya Yadav (Uttar Pradesh).

17 November 2022
Scorecard

Tripura; 261/8 (50 overs)	v	Himachal Pradesh; 222 (46.2 overs)
Manisankar Murasingh 69* (51); Digvijay Rangi 2/44 (8 overs)		Shubham Arora 62 (84); Subham Ghosh 3/47 (10 overs)

Tripura won by 39 runs
Palam B Ground, Delhi
Umpires: Vinod Seshan and Krishnaraj Srinath

- Himachal Pradesh won the toss and elected to field.

17 November 2022
Scorecard

Manipur; 138 (44 overs)	v	Chandigarh; 140/4 (25.3 overs)
Langlonyamba Keishangbam 38 (61); Sandeep Sharma 5/18 (10 overs)		Ankit Kaushik 45* (49); Kangabam Singh 2/14 (5 overs)

Chandigarh won by 6 wickets
Palam A Stadium, Delhi
Umpires: Yeshwant Barde and Tapan Sharma

- Manipur won the toss and elected to bat.

17 November 2022
Scorecard

Saurashtra; 285/8 (50 overs)	v	Gujarat; 178 (41.4 overs)
Arpit Vasavada 100* (86); Chintan Gaja 3/51 (10 overs)		Bhargav Merai 34 (52); Parth Bhut 4/57 (10 overs)

Saurashtra won by 107 runs
Arun Jaitley Stadium, Delhi
Umpires: Rohan Pandit and Rajesh Timaney

- Gujarat won the toss and elected to field.
- Priyesh Patel (Gujarat) made his List A debut.

=== Round 5 ===
19 November 2022
Scorecard

Tripura; 228 (49.2 overs)	v	Gujarat; 230/3 (45 overs)
Wriddhiman Saha 81 (89); Arzan Nagwaswalla 5/40 (9.2 overs)		Het Patel 74* (80); Deepak Khatri 1/32 (6 overs)

Gujarat won by 7 wickets
Jamia Millia Islamia University Ground, Delhi
Umpires: Tapan Sharma and Krishnaraj Srinath

- Gujarat won the toss and elected to field.

19 November 2022
Scorecard

Manipur; 191/8 (50 overs)	v	Hyderabad; 192/3 (28.1 overs)
Bikash Singh 44* (37); Mehrdtra Shashank 3/16 (10 overs)		Tilak Varma 126* (77); Rex Rajkumar 2/33 (7 overs)

Hyderabad won by 7 wickets
Palam B Ground, Delhi
Umpires: Yeshwant Barde and Rajesh Timaney

- Manipur won the toss and elected to bat.
- Sanatombaroy Laiphangbam (Manipur), Dheeraj Goud, Bhagath Varma, Mehrdtra Shashank, Tholkanti Goudmade (Hyderabad) all made their List A debuts.

19 November 2022
Scorecard

Uttar Pradesh; 309/4 (50 overs)	v	Chandigarh; 310/5 (50 overs)
Madhav Kaushik 134 (138); Sandeep Sharma 3/66 (10 overs)		Arslan Khan 141* (144); Aaqib Khan 2/51 (9 overs)

Chandigarh won by 5 wickets
Palam A Stadium, Delhi
Umpires: Jayaraman Madanagopal and Vinod Seshan

- Chandigarh won the toss and elected to field.

19 November 2022
Scorecard

Himachal Pradesh; 130 (36.4 overs)	v	Saurashtra; 134/2 (27.2 overs)
Sumeet Verma 82 (99); Jaydev Unadkat 5/23 (9 overs)		Sheldon Jackson 56* (53); Rishi Dhawan 1/21 (7 overs)

Saurashtra won by 8 wickets
Arun Jaitley Stadium, Delhi
Umpires: Mohit Krishnadas and Rohan Pandit

- Saurashtra won the toss and elected to field.

=== Round 6 ===
21 November 2022
Scorecard

Himachal Pradesh; 302/8 (50 overs)	v	Chandigarh; 303/5 (49.5 overs)
Ekant Sen 116 (104); Jagjit Singh 3/64 (10 overs)		Arslan Khan 107 (104); Mayank Yadav 2/61 (10 overs)

Chandigarh won by 5 wickets
Jamia Millia Islamia University Ground, Delhi
Umpires: Krishnaraj Srinath and Rajesh Timaney

- Chandigarh won the toss and elected to field.

21 November 2022
Scorecard

Gujarat; 248/9 (50 overs)	v	Hyderabad; 251/6 (49 overs)
Kathan Patel 109 (136); Elligaram Sanketh 3/39 (7 overs)		Rohit Rayudu 109 (125); Kathan Patel 2/43 (7 overs)

Hyderabad won by 4 wickets
Palam B Ground, Delhi
Umpires: Yeshwant Barde and Mohit Krishnadas

- Hyderabad won the toss and elected to field.

21 November 2022
Scorecard

Tripura; 133 (42.1 overs)	v	Saurashtra; 134/6 (36.5 overs)
Rajat Dey 25 (64); Jaydev Unadkat 3/21 (9.1 overs)		Arpit Vasavada 51* (77); Rana Dutta 4/29 (10 overs)

Saurashtra won by 4 wickets
Palam A Stadium, Delhi
Umpires: Rohan Pandit and Vinod Seshan

- Saurashtra won the toss and elected to field.

21 November 2022
Scorecard

Manipur; 132 (32.3 overs)	v	Uttar Pradesh; 133/2 (19.2 overs)
Kangabam Singh 44 (49); Ankit Rajpoot 3/23 (6.3 overs)		Madhav Kaushik 75* (54); Pheiroijam Singh 2/48 (7 overs)

Uttar Pradesh won by 8 wickets
Arun Jaitley Stadium, Delhi
Umpires: Jayaraman Madanagopal and Tapan Sharma

- Uttar Pradesh won the toss and elected to field.
- Jasmer Dhankhar (Uttar Pradesh) made his List A debut.

=== Round 7 ===
23 November 2022
Scorecard

Hyderabad; 306/5 (50 overs)	v	Chandigarh; 196 (46.3 overs)
Bhavesh Seth 71 (60); Arpit Pannu 2/53 (10 overs)		Gurinder Singh 59 (81); Gangam Anikethreddy 3/21 (8.3 overs)

Hyderabad won by 110 runs
Jamia Millia Islamia University Ground, Delhi
Umpires: Vinod Seshan and Krishnaraj Srinath

- Chandigarh won the toss and elected to field.

23 November 2022
Scorecard

Saurashtra; 218/9 (50 overs)	v	Uttar Pradesh; 219/8 (47.4 overs)
Samarth Vyas 42 (45); Shivam Mavi 2/17 (8 overs)		Akshdeep Nath 89* (109); Parth Bhut 3/64 (10 overs)

Uttar Pradesh won by 2 wickets
Palam B Ground, Delhi
Umpires: Rohan Pandit and Rajesh Timaney

- Uttar Pradesh won the toss and elected to field.

23 November 2022
Scorecard

Himachal Pradesh; 265 (49.2 overs)	v	Gujarat; 270/2 (47.3 overs)
Mayank Dagar 92 (84); Chintan Gaja 5/42 (10 overs)		Kathan Patel 80 (94); Akash Vasisht 2/52 (10 overs)

Gujarat won by 8 wickets
Palam A Stadium, Delhi
Umpires: Mohit Krishnadas and Jayaraman Madanagopal

- Gujarat won the toss and elected to field.

23 November 2022
Scorecard

Tripura; 346/6 (50 overs)	v	Manipur; 106 (28 overs)
Bikramkumar Das 123 (134); Bikash Singh 4/56 (7 overs)		Karnajit Yumnam 25 (37); Manisankar Murasingh 5/22 (10 overs)

Tripura won by 240 runs
Arun Jaitley Stadium, Delhi
Umpires: Yeshwant Barde and Tapan Sharma

- Manipur won the toss and elected to field.
