= 2022–23 Syed Mushtaq Ali Trophy Group B =

Cricket tournament

- Dates: October 11th – November 5th 2022
- Administrator: BCCI
- Cricket format: Twenty20 cricket
- Tournament format: Round-robin
- Participants: 8

The 2022–23 Syed Mushtaq Ali Trophy was the fifteenth season of the Syed Mushtaq Ali Trophy, a Twenty20 cricket tournament played in India. It was contested by 38 teams, divided into five groups, with eight teams in Group B. The tournament was announced by BCCI on August 8, 2022.

== Points table ==
Pos	Team	Pld	W	L	NR	Pts	NRR
1	Delhi	7	6	1	0	24	1.187
2	Punjab	7	6	1	0	24	2.838
3	Uttar Pradesh	7	4	3	0	16	0.546
4	Goa	7	4	3	0	16	0.061
5	Hyderabad	7	4	3	0	16	−0.167
6	Tripura	7	3	4	0	12	0.087
7	Manipur	7	1	6	0	4	−2.872
8	Pondicherry	7	0	7	0	0	−1.524

Updated to match(es) played on 22 October 2022. Source: ESPN Cricinfo

Advanced to Quarter-final
Advanced to Preliminary quarter-final

== Fixtures ==
=== Round 1 ===
11 October 2022
Scorecard

Delhi; 167/7 (20 overs)	v	Manipur; 96/7 (20 overs)
Hiten Dalal 47 (27); Kishan Singha 2/20 (4 overs)		Nitesh Sedai 16 (17); Hrithik Shokeen 2/13 (3 overs)

Delhi won by 71 runs
Jaipuria Vidyalaya Ground, Jaipur
Umpires: Parashar Joshi and Belur Ravi

- Manipur won the toss and elected to field.
- Chingakham Bidash (Manipur), Yash Dhull and Mayank Yadav (Delhi) all made their T20 debuts.
- Impact Player Subs: Hrithik Shokeen for Hiten Dalal (Delhi) and Ahmed Shah for Bishworjit Konthoujam (Manipur).

11 October 2022
Scorecard

Tripura; 114/8 (20 overs)	v	Goa; 118/5 (18.1 overs)
Sayan Ghosh 24* (24); Amit Yadav 3/10 (3 overs)		Tunish Sawkar 36 (25); Manisankar Murasingh 1/15 (3.1 over)

Goa won by 5 wickets
Sawai Mansingh Stadium, Jaipur
Umpires: Vikas Lund and Mohamad Rafi

- Goa won the toss and elected to field.
- Deepak Khatri, Sridam Paul (Tripura) and Tunish Sawkar (Goa) all made their T20 debuts.
- Impact Player Subs: Subham Ghosh for Bikramkumar Das (Tripura) and Tunish Sawkar for Felix Alemao (Goa).

11 October 2022
Scorecard

Pondicherry; 94 (18.4 overs)	v	Uttar Pradesh; 88/0 (12.3 overs)
Parameeswaran Sivaraman 36 (37); Shiva Singh 3/20 (4 overs)		Aryan Juyal 43* (34)

Uttar Pradesh won by 10 wickets (DLS method)
Jaipuria Vidyalaya Ground, Jaipur
Umpires: Parashar Joshi and Belur Ravi

- Pondicherry won the toss and elected to bat.
- Tharayil Abeesh, Akash Kargave, Abin Mathew, Mohit Mittan, Krishna Pandey and Parameeswaran Sivaraman (Pondicherry) all made their T20 debuts.
- Impact Player Subs: Paras Dogra for Akash Kargave (Pondicherry).

11 October 2022
Scorecard

Punjab; 174/4 (20 overs)	v	Hyderabad; 115 (18.4 overs)
Sanvir Singh 55* (19); CTL Rakshan 2/53 (4 overs)		Tilak Varma 50 (38); Baltej Singh 3/22 (4 overs); Abhishek Sharma 3/22 (4 overs)

Punjab won by 59 runs
Sawai Mansingh Stadium, Jaipur
Umpires: Vikas Lund and Mohamad Rafi

- Hyderabad won the toss and elected to field.
- Gaurav Chaudhary, Ashwani Kumar (Punjab), Muthyala Charan, B Punnaiah, Rakshann Readdi and Prateek Reddy (Hyderabad) all made their T20 debuts.
- Impact Player Subs: Ashwani Kumar for Abhishek Sharma (Punjab) and Muthyala Charan for B Punnaiah (Hyderabad).

=== Round 2 ===
12 October 2022
Scorecard

Uttar Pradesh; 163/6 (20 overs)	v	Tripura; 166/4 (19.3 overs)
Akshdeep Nath 37 (24); Parvez Sultan 2/29 (4 overs)		Sudip Chatterjee 49* (44); Karan Sharma 2/28 (4 overs)

Tripura won by 6 wickets.
Jaipuria Vidyalaya Ground, Jaipur
Umpires: Mohamad Rafi and Belur Ravi

- Tripura won the toss and elected to field.
- Divyansh Joshi (Uttar Pradesh) made his T20 debut.
- Impact Player Subs: Akshdeep Nath for Aryan Juyal (Uttar Pradesh) and Subham Ghosh for Abhijit Sarkar (Tripura).

12 October 2022
Scorecard

Hyderabad; 147/8 (20 overs)	v	Pondicherry; 143/4 (20 overs)
Tilak Varma 57 (41); Bharat Sharma 4/18 (4 overs)		Ramachandran Ragupathy 35 (35); Bhagath Varma 1/11 (2 overs)

Hyderabad won by 4 runs
Sawai Mansingh Stadium, Jaipur
Umpires: Parashar Joshi and Vikas Lund

- Pondicherry won the toss and elected to field.
- P Nitesh Reddy and Bhagath Varma (Hyderabad) both made their T20 debuts.
- Impact Player Subs: B Punnaiah for Rahul Buddhi (Hyderabad) and Satish Jangir for Sagar Udeshi (Pondicherry).

12 October 2022
Scorecard

Manipur; 134/9 (20 overs)	v	Goa; 138/3 (17.2 overs)
Nitesh Sedai 53 (42); Arjun Tendulkar 2/20 (4 overs)		Siddhesh Lad 59 (37); Rex Rajkumar 1/5 (2 overs)

Goa won by 7 wickets
Jaipuria Vidyalaya Ground, Jaipur
Umpires: Mohamad Rafi and Belur Ravi

- Manipur won the toss and elected to bat.
- Impact Player Sub: Ajay Lamabam for Karnajit Yumnam (Manipur).

12 October 2022
Scorecard

Delhi; 191/4 (20 overs)	v	Punjab; 179/5 (20 overs)
Nitish Rana 107 (61); Abhishek Sharma 2/16 (3 overs)		Anmolpreet Singh 64 (47); Nitish Rana 2/24 (3 overs)

Delhi won by 12 runs
Sawai Mansingh Stadium, Jaipur
Umpires: Parashar Joshi and Vikas Lund

- Delhi won the toss and elected to bat.
- Pukhraj Mann (Punjab) made his T20 debut.
- Impact Player Subs: Hrithik Shokeen for Hiten Dalal (Delhi) and Pukhraj Mann for Baltej Singh (Punjab).

=== Round 3 ===
14 October 2022
Scorecard

Tripura; 118/7 (20 overs)	v	Punjab; 119/1 (15 overs)
Wriddhiman Saha 62 (55); Siddharth Kaul 3/33 (4 overs)		Prabhsimran Singh 57* (43); Chiranjit Paul 1/37 (4 overs)

Punjab won by 9 wickets
Jaipuria Vidyalaya Ground, Jaipur
Umpires: Vikas Lund and Mohamad Rafi

- Punjab won the toss and elected to field.
- Impact Player Sub: Subham Ghosh for Bikramkumar Das (Tripura).

14 October 2022
Scorecard

Delhi; 99 (19.5 overs)	v	Uttar Pradesh; 102/2 (17 overs)
Nitish Rana 45 (39); Shivam Mavi 4/14 (3.5 overs)		Karan Sharma 52* (50); Shivank Vashisht 2/21 (4 overs)

Uttar Pradesh won by 8 wickets
Sawai Mansingh Stadium, Jaipur
Umpires: Parashar Joshi and Belur Ravi

- Delhi won the toss and elected to bat.
- Yogesh Sharma (Delhi) made his T20 debut.
- Impact Player Subs: Akshdeep Nath for Kartik Tyagi (Uttar Pradesh) and Pranshu Vijayran for Hiten Dalal (Delhi).

14 October 2022
Scorecard

Manipur; 125/7 (20 overs)	v	Pondicherry; 122/5 (20 overs)
Kangabam Singh 58 (39); Bharat Sharma 2/15 (3 overs)		Vikneshwaran Marimuthu 45 (49); Bidash Chingakham 2/25 (3 overs)

Manipur won by 3 runs
Jaipuria Vidyalaya Ground, Jaipur
Umpires: Vikas Lund and Mohamad Rafi

- Manipur won the toss and elected to bat.
- Thivagar Gopal (Pondicherry) made his T20 debut.
- Impact Player Subs: Ajay Lamabam for Karnajit Yumnam (Manipur) and Satish Jangir for Sagar Udeshi (Pondicherry).

14 October 2022
Scorecard

Hyderabad; 177/6 (20 overs)	v	Goa; 140 (18.5 overs)
Tilak Varma 62 (46); Arjun Tendulkar 4/10 (4 overs)		Aditya Kaushik 33 (22); Ravi Teja 4/20 (3.5 overs)

Hyderabad won by 37 runs
Sawai Mansingh Stadium, Jaipur
Umpires: Parashar Joshi and Belur Ravi

- Goa won the toss and elected to field.
- Gangam Anikethreddy and Jayram Reddy (Hyderabad) both made their T20 debuts.
- Impact Player Subs: Trishank Gupta for Rahul Buddhi (Hyderabad) and Tunish Sawkar for Felix Alemao (Goa).

=== Round 4 ===
16 October 2022
Scorecard

Pondicherry; 168/8 (20 overs)	v	Delhi; 169/3 (19.2 overs)
Parameeswaran Sivaraman 43 (30); Navdeep Saini 3/37 (4 overs)		Yash Dhull 71* (46); Rohan Suresh 1/28 (4 overs)

Delhi won by 7 wickets
Jaipuria Vidyalaya Ground, Jaipur
Umpires: Parashar Joshi and Vikas Lund

- Delhi won the toss and elected to field.
- Rohan Suresh (Pondicherry) made his T20 debut.
- Impact Player Subs: Parameeswaran Sivaraman for Rohan Suresh (Pondicherry) and Yogesh Sharma for Ishant Sharma (Delhi).

16 October 2022
Scorecard

Tripura; 158/8 (20 overs)	v	Hyderabad; 162/5 (20 overs)
Bikramkumar Das 73 (56); Ravi Teja 2/27 (4 overs)		Tilak Varma 67 (46); Rana Dutta 1/18 (3 overs)

Hyderabad won by 5 wickets
KL Saini Ground, Jaipur
Umpires: Mohamad Rafi and Belur Ravi

- Hyderabad won the toss and elected to field.
- Shreyas Vala (Hyderabad) made his T20 debut.
- Impact Player Subs: Bhagath Varma for B Punnaiah (Hyderabad) and Sridam Paul for Bishal Ghosh (Tripura).

16 October 2022
Scorecard

Goa; 138/7 (20 overs)	v	Punjab; 142/1 (15.4 overs)
Suyash Prabhudessai 64 (49); Siddharth Kaul 4/28 (4 overs)		Prabhsimran Singh 74 (43); Lakshay Garg 1/18 (3 overs)

Punjab won by 9 wickets
Jaipuria Vidyalaya Ground, Jaipur
Umpires: Parashar Joshi and Vikas Lund

- Goa won the toss and elected to bat.
- Impact Player Sub: Tunish Sawkar for Vaibhav Govekar (Goa).

16 October 2022
Scorecard

Manipur; 137/4 (20 overs)	v	Uttar Pradesh; 138/0 (12.4 overs)
Karnajit Yumnam 64 (45); Aaqib Khan 2/19 (3 overs)		Karan Sharma 79* (41)

Uttar Pradesh won by 10 wickets
KL Saini Ground, Jaipur
Umpires: Mohamad Rafi and Belur Ravi

- Manipur won the toss and elected to bat.
- Jasmer Dhankhar and Sameer Rizvi (Uttar Pradesh) both made their T20 debuts.
- Impact Player Sub: Ajay Lamabam for Karnajit Yumnam (Manipur).

=== Round 5 ===
18 October 2022
Scorecard

Goa; 131/7 (20 overs)	v	Uttar Pradesh; 120/8 (20 overs)
Eknath Kerkar 31* (35); Shivam Mavi 3/16 (3 overs)		Rinku Singh 38 (37); Lakshay Garg 4/16 (4 overs)

Goa won by 11 runs
Jaipuria Vidyalaya Ground, Jaipur
Umpires: Parashar Joshi and Belur Ravi

- Uttar Pradesh won the toss and elected to field.
- Ruthvik Naik (Goa) made his T20 debut.
- Impact Player Sub: Akshdeep Nath for Kartik Tyagi (Uttar Pradesh).

18 October 2022
Scorecard

Manipur; 40 (14.1 overs)	v	Punjab; 43/1 (5.3 overs)
Rex Rajkumar 25 (23); Mayank Markande 4/4 (3.1 overs)		Abhishek Sharma 28* (18); Bishworjit Konthoujam 1/15 (2.3 overs)

Punjab won by 9 wickets
Sawai Mansingh Stadium, Jaipur
Umpires: Vikas Lund and Mohamad Rafi

- Manipur won the toss and elected to bat.
- Bikash Singh (Manipur) made his T20 debut.
- Impact Player Sub: Karnajit Yumnam for Sultan Karim (Manipur).

18 October 2022
Scorecard

Delhi; 196/6 (20 overs)	v	Hyderabad; 150 (19.1 overs)
Yash Dhull 73 (36); Ravi Teja 3/54 (4 overs)		Rahul Buddhi 47 (35); Navdeep Saini 4/17 (3.1 overs)

Delhi won by 46 runs
Jaipuria Vidyalaya Ground, Jaipur
Umpires: Parashar Joshi and Belur Ravi

- Hyderabad won the toss and elected to field.
- Bhavesh Seth (Hyderabad) made his T20 debut.
- Impact Player Sub: P Nitesh Reddy for B Punnaiah (Hyderabad).

18 October 2022
Scorecard

Tripura; 159/6 (20 overs)	v	Pondicherry; 136/8 (20 overs)
Bikramkumar Das 61 (56); Ankit Sharma 2/19 (4 overs)		Vikneshwaran Marimuthu 34* (29); Parvez Sultan 3/20 (4 overs)

Tripura won by 23 runs
Sawai Mansingh Stadium, Jaipur
Umpires: Vikas Lund and Mohamad Rafi

- Pondicherry won the toss and elected to field.
- Arulprakasam Aravindaraj and Avinash Jadhav (Pondicherry) both made their T20 debuts.
- Impact Player Subs: Avinash Jadhav for Ramachandran Ragupathy (Pondicherry) and Sankar Paul for Bikramkumar Das (Tripura).

=== Round 6 ===
20 October 2022
Scorecard

Pondicherry; 86/9 (20 overs)	v	Punjab; 87/2 (10 overs)
Parameeswaran Sivaraman 25 (30); Siddharth Kaul 5/12 (4 overs)		Abhishek Sharma 29 (17); Sagar Udeshi 1/27 (4 overs)

Punjab won by 8 wickets
Jaipuria Vidyalaya Ground, Jaipur
Umpires: Parashar Joshi and Vikas Lund

- Punjab won the toss and elected to field.
- Impact Player Sub: Rohan Suresh for Sagar Udeshi (Pondicherry).

20 October 2022
Scorecard

Goa; 131/6 (20 overs)	v	Delhi; 133/4 (17 overs)
Deepraj Gaonkar 40 (32); Navdeep Saini 2/34 (4 overs)		Nitish Rana 49* (38); Amit Yadav 2/22 (4 overs)

Delhi won by 6 wickets
Sawai Mansingh Stadium, Jaipur
Umpires: Mohamad Rafi and Belur Ravi

- Delhi won the toss and elected to field
- Vedant Naik (Goa) made his T20 debut.
- Impact Player Subs: Amulya Pandrekar for Tunish Sawkar (Goa) and Yogesh Sharma for Mayank Yadav (Delhi).

20 October 2022
Scorecard

Hyderabad; 132/9 (20 overs)	v	Uttar Pradesh; 133/3 (19.1 overs)
Tilak Varma 48 (37); Karan Sharma 3/19 (3 overs)		Aryan Juyal 71* (58); Trishank Gupta 2/23 (3.1 overs)

Uttar Pradesh won by 7 wickets
Jaipuria Vidyalaya Ground, Jaipur
Umpires: Parashar Joshi and Vikas Lund

- Hyderabad won the toss and elected to bat.
- Impact Player Subs: Dhruv Jurel for Kartik Tyagi (Uttar Pradesh) and Trishank Gupta for Ravi Teja (Hyderabad).

20 October 2022
Scorecard

Manipur; 108/7 (20 overs)	v	Tripura; 111/2 (11.2 overs)
Langlonyamba Keishangbam 37* (36); Chiranjit Paul 2/17 (4 overs)		Bikramkumar Das 67* (41); Sultan Karim 1/13 (1.2 overs)

Tripura won by 8 wickets
Sawai Mansingh Stadium, Jaipur
Umpires: Mohamad Rafi and Belur Ravi

- Manipur won the toss and elected to bat.
- Impact Player Sub: Sultan Karim for Karnajit Yumnam (Manipur).

=== Round 7 ===
22 October 2022
Scorecard

Manipur; 117 (19.5 overs)	v	Hyderabad; 120/0 (14.3 overs)
Langlonyamba Keishangbam 49 (43); Elligaram Sanketh 3/19 (4 overs)		Rahul Buddhi 72* (51)

Hyderabad won by 10 wickets
Jaipuria Vidyalaya Ground, Jaipur
Umpires: Parashar Joshi and Belur Ravi

- Hyderabad won the toss and elected to field.
- Alankrit Agarwal and Rishith Reddy (Hyderabad) both made their T20 debuts.
- Impact Player Subs: Rahul Buddhi for Elligaram Sanketh (Hyderabad) and Sultan Karim for Johnson Singh (Manipur).

22 October 2022
Scorecard

Uttar Pradesh; 147/7 (20 overs)	v	Punjab; 148/1 (15.1 overs)
Rinku Singh 79 (47); Baltej Singh 3/26 (4 overs)		Prabhsimran Singh 80* (49); Karan Sharma 1/10 (1 over)

Punjab won by 9 wickets
Sawai Mansingh Stadium, Jaipur
Umpires: Vikas Lund and Mohamad Rafi

- Uttar Pradesh won the toss and elected to bat.
- Impact Player Sub: Sammer Rizvi for Priyam Garg (Uttar Pradesh).

22 October 2022
Scorecard

Tripura; 134 (19.4 overs)	v	Delhi; 139/4 (17.1 overs)
Wriddhiman Saha 28 (20); Lalit Yadav 3/15 (3.4 overs)		Nitish Rana 61 (31); Manisankar Murasingh 2/15 (4 overs)

Delhi won by 6 wickets
Jaipuria Vidyalaya Ground, Jaipur
Umpires: Parashar Joshi and Belur Ravi

- Delhi won the toss and elected to field.
- Vaibhav Kandpal and Lakshay Thareja (Delhi) both made their T20 debuts.
- Impact Player Sub: Sankar Paul for Sudip Chatterjee (Tripura).

22 October 2022
Scorecard

Pondicherry; 88 (18 overs)	v	Goa; 89/4 (12.4 overs)
Akash Kargave 35 (41); Amit Yadav 4/12 (4 overs)		Ishaan Gadekar 45 (24); Ankit Sharma 2/34 (3.4 overs)

Goa won by 6 wickets
Sawai Mansingh Stadium, Jaipur
Umpires: Vikas Lund and Mohamad Rafi

- Goa won the toss and elected to field.
- Samar Dubhashi and Vishamber Kahlon (Goa) both made their T20 debuts.
- Impact Player Sub: Vishamber Kahlon for Vedant Naik (Goa).
