= 2022–23 Ranji Trophy Group B =

Cricket tournament

- Dates: 13 December 2022 – 10 February 2023
- Administrator(s): BCCI
- Cricket format: First-class cricket
- Tournament format(s): Round-robin then knockout
- Participants: 8

The 2022–23 Ranji Trophy is the 88th season of the Ranji Trophy, the premier first-class cricket tournament in India. It is contested by 38 teams, divided into four elite groups and a plate group, with eight teams in Group B. The tournament was announced by the Board of Control for Cricket in India (BCCI) on 8 August 2022.

== Points table ==
Pos	Team	Pld	W	L	T	D	NR	Pts	Quot
1	Saurashtra	7	3	2	0	2	0	26	1.277
2	Andhra	7	4	2	0	1	0	26	1.119
3	Maharashtra	7	3	0	0	4	0	26	1.345
4	Mumbai	7	3	2	0	2	0	24	1.533
5	Tamil Nadu	7	2	1	0	4	0	21	1.225
6	Delhi	7	2	2	0	3	0	17	0.902
7	Assam	7	1	3	0	3	0	11	0.546
8	Hyderabad	7	0	6	0	1	0	1	0.523

Updated to match(es) played on 27 January 2023. Source: ESPN Cricinfo

Advances to Quarter-final Relegated to Plate Group for next season

== Fixtures ==
=== Round 1 ===
13–16 December 2022
Scorecard

Assam	v	Saurashtra
286 (94.3 overs); Rahul Hazarika 90 (219); Chetan Sakariya 5/40 (17.3 overs)		492 (115.1 overs); Jay Gohil 227 (246); Riyan Parag 4/119 (30.1 overs)
366/6 (102 overs); Riyan Parag 95 (150); Prerak Mankad 3/31 (17 overs)

Match drawn
Assam Cricket Association Stadium, Guwahati
Umpires: Vineet Kulkarni and Kamlesh Sharma
Player of the match: Jay Gohil (Saurashtra)

- Saurashtra won the toss and elected to field.
- Avinov Choudhury, Sunil Lachit, Akash Sengupta (Assam) and Jay Gohil (Saurashtra) all made their first-class debuts.

13–15 December 2022
Scorecard

Andhra	v	Mumbai
238 (74.4 overs); Shoaib Md Khan 84 (99); Tanush Kotian 4/91 (18 overs)		331 (123 overs); Armaan Jaffer 116 (271); Shoaib Md Khan 4/73 (17 overs)
131 (47.4 overs); Uppara Girinath 27 (32); Tushar Deshpande 3/34 (12.4 overs)		40/1 (6.1 overs); Armaan Jaffer 17* (14); K. V. Sasikanth 1/13 (3 overs)

Mumbai won by 9 wickets
Dr PVG Raju ACA Sports Complex, Vizianagaram
Umpires: Madanagopal Kuppuraj and Nitin Menon
Player of the match: Tanush Kotian (Mumbai)

- Mumbai won the toss and elected to field.

13–16 December 2022
Scorecard

Hyderabad	v	Tamil Nadu
395 (115 overs); Mickil Jaiswal 137* (193); Sandeep Warrier 5/83 (29 overs)		510/4d (111.5 overs); Sai Sudharsan 179 (273); Tanay Thyagarajan 2/106 (25 overs)
258 (85 overs); Tanay Thyagarajan 69 (137); Ravisrinivasan Sai Kishore 5/101 (28 overs)		108/1 (7 overs); Narayan Jagadeesan 59* (22); Kartikeya Kak 1/41 (3 overs)

Match drawn
Rajiv Gandhi International Cricket Stadium, Hyderabad
Umpires: Anil Chaudhary and Tapan Sharma
Player of the match: Sai Sudharsan (Tamil Nadu)

- Tamil Nadu won the toss and elected to field.
- Kartikeya Kak, Abhirath Reddy (Hyderabad), Sai Sudharsan and R Kavin (Tamil Nadu) all made their first-class debuts.

13–16 December 2022
Scorecard

Delhi	v	Maharashtra
191 (48.2 overs); Himmat Singh 49 (71); Manoj Ingale 5/43 (17 overs)		324 (124.5 overs); Azim Kazi 124 (272); Simarjeet Singh 4/69 (35 overs)
310 (98.4 overs); Himmat Singh 84 (132); Rajvardhan Hangargekar 3/75 (21 overs)		180/1 (45.4 overs); Pavan Shah 87* (132); Lalit Yadav 1/59 (14 overs)

Maharashtra won by 9 wickets
Maharashtra Cricket Association Stadium, Pune
Umpires: Akshay Totre and Anand Ovalekar
Player of the match: Ashay Palkar (Maharashtra)

- Maharashtra won the toss and elected to field.
- Mayank Yadav (Delhi), Rajvardhan Hangargekar, Saurabh Nawale, Siddhesh Veer and Kaushal Tambe (Maharashtra) all made their first-class debuts.

=== Round 2 ===
20–23 December 2022
Scorecard

Delhi	v	Assam
439 (110.1 overs); Dhruv Shorey 252* (317); Sidharth Sarmah 3/53 (13.1 overs)		443/9d (129.3 overs); Rishav Das 160 (229); Harshit Rana 4/94 (30.3 overs)
292/1 (61.1 overs); Dhruv Shorey 150* (188); Swarupam Purkayastha 1/57 (17 overs)

Match drawn
Assam Cricket Association Stadium, Guwahati
Umpires: K. N. Ananthapadmanabhan and Anil Dandekar
Player of the match: Dhruv Shorey (Delhi)

- Assam won the toss and elected to field.
- Harshit Rana, Hrithik Shokeen and Pranshu Vijayran (Delhi) all made their first-class debuts.
- Substitute: Abhishek Thakuri for Rahul Hazarika (Assam).
- Dhruv Shorey (Delhi) carried his bat.

20–23 December 2022
Scorecard

Andhra	v	Tamil Nadu
297 (100.1 overs); Abhishek Reddy 85 (129); Sandeep Warrier 3/64 (24 overs)		345 (112.1 overs); Sai Sudharsan 113 (180); Nitish Kumar Reddy 4/37 (15 overs)
250 (76.4 overs); Ricky Bhui 76 (143); Ravisrinivasan Sai Kishore 5/88 (28.4 overs)		194 (56.2 overs); Washington Sundar 65 (118); Shoaib Md Khan 6/69 (23 overs)

Andhra won by 8 runs
SNR College Cricket Ground, Coimbatore
Umpires: Abhijit Deshmukh and Bharati Vij
Player of the match: Shoaib Md Khan (Andhra)

- Andhra won the toss and elected to bat.
- Ajith Ram (Tamil Nadu) made his first-class debut.

20–22 December 2022
Scorecard

Mumbai	v	Hyderabad
651/6d (127.2 overs); Ajinkya Rahane 204 (261); Kartikeya Kak 3/106 (19.2 overs)		214 (65.1 overs); Rohit Rayudu 77 (151); Shams Mulani 7/94 (26.1 overs)
		220 (67.2 overs) (f/o); Rahul Buddhi 65 (97); Tanush Kotian 5/82 (22.2 overs)

Mumbai won by an innings and 217 runs
Bandra Kurla Complex Ground, Mumbai
Umpires: Jayaraman Madanagopal and Nitin Pandit
Player of the match: Shams Mulani (Mumbai)

- Hyderabad won the toss and elected to field.
- Mehrotra Shashank (Hyderabad) made his first-class debut.

20–23 December 2022
Scorecard

Maharashtra	v	Saurashtra
493 (181.4 overs); Naushad Shaikh 101 (204); Chetan Sakariya 3/84 (35 overs)		497/7 (130.3 overs); Arpit Vasavada 127* (225); Vicky Ostwal 2/69 (24 overs)

Match drawn
Saurashtra Cricket Association Stadium, Rajkot
Umpires: Nitin Menon and Sanjay Kumar Singh
Player of the match: Arpit Vasavada (Saurashtra)

- Saurashtra won the toss and elected to field.
- Devang Karamta (Saurashtra) made his first-class debut.

=== Round 3 ===
27–30 December 2022
Scorecard

Maharashtra	v	Andhra
200 (57.3 overs); Saurabh Nawale 70 (62); Nitish Kumar Reddy 5/53 (15 overs)		211 (79 overs); Karan Shinde 52 (151); Satyajeet Bachhav 3/19 (10 overs)
250 (81.1 overs); Ruturaj Gaikwad 63 (98); Nitish Kumar Reddy 3/66 (19.1 overs)		108 (38.1 overs); Hanuma Vihari 36 (77); Pradeep Dadhe 6/20 (11.1 overs)

Maharashtra won by 131 runs
Dr PVG Raju ACA Sports Complex, Vizianagaram
Umpires: Abhijit Bengeri and Anil Chaudhary
Player of the match: Pradeep Dadhe (Maharashtra)

- Andhra won the toss and elected to field.
- M Madhav Rayudu (Andhra) made his first-class debut.

27–30 December 2022
Scorecard

Assam	v	Hyderabad
205 (56.4 overs); Swarupam Purkayastha 83 (88); Ravi Teja 4/53 (16 overs)		208 (66.5 overs); Rohit Rayudu 60 (169); Riyan Parag 4/48 (20 overs)
252 (75.2 overs); Riyan Parag 78 (28); Ravi Teja 5/50 (15.2 overs)		231 (61.5 overs); Tanmay Agarwal 126* (158); Riyan Parag 4/93 (25.5 overs)

Assam won by 18 runs
Rajiv Gandhi International Stadium, Hyderabad
Umpires: Mohit Krishnadas and Jayaraman Madanagopal
Player of the match: Riyan Parag (Assam)

- Hyderabad won the toss and elected to field.
- Samhith Reddy, Bhavesh Seth and Bhagath Varma (Hyderabad) all made their first-class debuts.
- Tanmay Agarwal (Hyderabad) carried his bat.

27–30 December 2022
Scorecard

Delhi	v	Tamil Nadu
303 (97.1 overs); Dhruv Shorey 66 (168); Lakshminarayanan Vignesh 4/50 (25 overs)		427/8d (116 overs); Pradosh Ranjan Paul 124 (212); Harshit Rana 3/121 (26 overs)
262 (79.5 overs); Vaibhav Rawal 95* (142); Washington Sundar 4/43 (17.5 overs)		54/3 (6 overs); Sai Sudharsan 24 (19); Kuldip Yadav 2/27 (3 overs)

Match drawn
Arun Jaitley Stadium, Delhi
Umpires: Saiyed Khalid and Pashchim Pathak
Player of the match: Pradosh Ranjan Paul (Tamil Nadu)

- Tamil Nadu won the toss and elected to field.

27–30 December 2022
Scorecard

Saurashtra	v	Mumbai
289 (79.1 overs); Arpit Vasavada 75 (155); Shams Mulani 4/109 (29.1 overs)		230 (63.3 overs); Suryakumar Yadav 95 (107); Yuvrajsinh Dodiya 4/43 (12.3 overs)
220 (52.4 overs); Dharmendrasinh Jadeja 90 (125); Shams Mulani 6/65 (19 overs)		231 (74 overs); Prithvi Shaw 68 (99); Parth Bhut 4/56 (20 overs)

Saurashtra won by 48 runs
Bandra Kurla Complex Ground, Mumbai
Umpires: Nikhil Patwardhan and Tapan Sharma
Player of the match: Dharmendrasinh Jadeja (Saurashtra)

- Saurashtra won the toss and elected to bat.
- Yuvrajsinh Dodiya (Saurashtra) and Musheer Khan (Mumbai) both made their first-class debuts.

=== Round 4 ===
3–6 January 2023
Scorecard

Andhra	v	Hyderabad
135 (51.1 overs); Abhishek Reddy 81 (145); Ravi Teja 5/34 (16 overs)		197 (63.1 overs); Mehrotra Shashank 47 (55); Nitish Kumar Reddy 4/64 (19 overs)
462 (107.3 overs); Ricky Bhui 116 (150); Rakshan Readdi 3/120 (30 overs)		246 (73.3 overs); Chandan Sahani 56 (87); K. V. Sasikanth 5/68 (23 overs)

Andhra won by 154 runs
Dr PVG Raju ACA Sports Complex, Vizianagaram
Umpires: Manish Jain and Nagaraj Ramesh
Player of the match: Ricky Bhui (Andhra)

- Hyderabad won the toss and elected to field.
- Kodavandla Sudharsan (Andhra) and Pragnay Reddy (Hyderabad) both made their first-class debuts.

3–6 January 2023
Scorecard

Assam	v	Maharashtra
274 (87.4 overs); Swarupam Purkayastha 65 (91); Ashay Palkar 3/56 (17.3 overs)		594/9d (147 overs); Kedar Jadhav 283 (283); Riyan Parag 4/165 (42 overs)
309/6 (121.3 overs); Rishav Das 114* (211); Siddhesh Veer 3/79 (30.3 overs)

Match drawn
DY Patil Academy, Ambi
Umpires: Nitin Menon and Chirra Ravikanthreddy
Player of the match: Kedar Jadhav (Maharashtra)

- Maharashtra won the toss and elected to field.

3–5 January 2023
Scorecard

Delhi	v	Saurashtra
133 (35 overs); Hrithik Shokeen 68* (90); Jaydev Unadkat 8/39 (12 overs)		574/8d (147.2 overs); Arpit Vasavada 152* (251); Hrithik Shokeen 4/244 (61.2 overs)
227 (63.5 overs); Hrithik Shokeen 51 (71); Yuvrajsinh Dodiya 5/91 (26.5 overs)

Saurashtra won by an innings and 214 runs
Saurashtra Cricket Association Stadium, Rajkot
Umpires: Somnath Jha and Akshay Totre
Player of the match: Jaydev Unadkat (Saurashtra)

- Delhi won the toss and elected to bat.
- Ayush Badoni and Lakshay Thareja (Delhi) both made their first-class debuts.

3–6 January 2022
Scorecard

Tamil Nadu	v	Mumbai
144 (36.2 overs); Pradosh Ranjan Paul 55 (75); Tushar Deshpande 5/37 (11.2 overs)		481 (106.4 overs); Sarfaraz Khan 162 (220); Aswin Crist 3/69 (18 overs)
548 (162.5 overs); Pradosh Ranjan Paul 169 (308); Tanush Kotian 4/129 (35.5 overs)		137/3 (24.2 overs); Yashasvi Jaiswal 66* (60); Ravisrinivasan Sai Kishore 2/67 (11 overs)

Match drawn
Brabourne Stadium, Mumbai
Umpires: Ulhas Gandhe and Chettithody Shamshuddin
Player of the match: Sarfaraz Khan (Mumbai)

- Mumbai won the toss and elected to field.
- H. Trilok Nag (Tamil Nadu) made his first-class debut.

=== Round 5 ===
10–13 January 2023
Scorecard

Mumbai	v	Assam
687/4d (138.4 overs); Prithvi Shaw 379 (383); Riyan Parag 2/167 (37.4 overs)		370 (108.1 overs); Rahul Hazarika 79 (138); Shams Mulani 4/111 (35.1 overs)
		189 (45 overs) (f/o); Gokul Sharma 82 (136); Shardul Thakur 3/54 (13 overs)

Mumbai won by an innings and 128 runs
Amingaon Cricket Ground, Guwahati
Umpires: Rakesh Raghavan and Ranjeev Sharma
Player of the match: Prithvi Shaw (Mumbai)

- Assam won the toss and elected to field.
- Prasad Pawar (Mumbai) made his first-class debut.
- Prithvi Shaw (Mumbai) made the second highest individual score (379) in a single match in Ranji Trophy.

10–13 January 2023
Scorecard

Andhra	v	Delhi
459/9d (133.2 overs); Hanuma Vihari 85 (223); Hrithik Shokeen 4/114 (25 overs)		488/9d (147 overs); Dhruv Shorey 185 (311); Nitish Kumar Reddy 3/90 (32 overs)

Match drawn
Arun Jaitley Stadium, Delhi
Umpires: Ghanshaym Prabhu and Sundaram Ravi
Player of the match: Dhruv Shorey (Delhi)

- Delhi won the toss and elected to field.
- Divij Mehra and Yogesh Sharma (Delhi) both made their first-class debuts.

10–11 January 2023
Scorecard

Hyderabad	v	Saurashtra
79 (30.5 overs); Rohit Rayudu 23 (72); Dharmendrasinh Jadeja 3/8 (3.5 overs)		327 (68.3 overs); Harvik Desai 81 (108); Gangam Anikethreddy 7/95 (25.3 overs)
191 (46.4 overs); Tholkanti Goud 58 (125); Dharmendrasinh Jadeja 4/34 (14.4 overs)

Saurashtra won by an innings and 57 runs
Gymkhana Ground, Secunderabad
Umpires: Akshay Marathe and Navdeep Singh
Player of the match: Dharmendrasinh Jadeja (Saurashtra)

- Hyderabad won the toss and elected to bat.
- Tholkanti Goud and Abrar Mohiuddin (Hyderabad) both made their first-class debuts.

10–13 January 2023
Scorecard

Maharashtra	v	Tamil Nadu
446 (98 overs); Ruturaj Gaikwad 195 (184); Sandeep Warrier 3/105 (25 overs)		404 (118.5 overs); Vijay Shankar 107 (214); Pradeep Dadhe 3/67 (24 overs)
364/5 (90.3 overs); Ankit Bawne 152* (259); Sandeep Warrier 3/80 (21 overs)

Match drawn
Maharashtra Cricket Association Stadium, Pune
Umpires: Yeshwant Barde and Anil Dandekar
Player of the match: Ruturaj Gaikwad (Maharashtra)

- Tamil Nadu won the toss and elected to field.

=== Round 6 ===
17–20 January 2023
Scorecard

Andhra	v	Saurashtra
415 (141.3 overs); Ashwin Hebbar 109 (198); Yuvrajsinh Dodiya 3/81 (22.3 overs)		237 (63.2 overs); Sheldon Jackson 64 (76); Lalith Mohan 5/71 (22 overs)
164/7d (45 overs); Karan Shinde 50* (86); Jaydev Unadkat 2/17 (9 overs)		192 (56.2 overs); Cheteshwar Pujara 91 (146); Lalith Mohan 6/58 (22.2 overs)

Andhra won by 150 runs
Saurashtra Cricket Association Stadium, Rajkot
Umpires: Krishnaraj Srinath and Bharati Vij
Player of the match: Lalith Mohan (Andhra)

- Andhra won the toss and elected to bat.

17–20 January 2023
Scorecard

Tamil Nadu	v	Assam
540 (132.3 overs); Pradosh Ranjan Paul 153 (212); Riyan Parag 4/101 (28.3 overs)		266 (100.2 overs); Swarupam Purkayastha 74 (161); Ajith Ram 4/68 (30 overs)
		204 (88.1 overs) (f/o); Rishav Das 58 (121); Ajith Ram 5/70 (24.1 overs)

Tamil Nadu won by an innings and 70 runs
M. A. Chidambaram Stadium, Chennai
Umpires: MS Bhatt and Sivasubramaniyan Shankar
Player of the match: Ajith Ram (Tamil Nadu)

- Tamil Nadu won the toss and elected to bat.

17–20 January 2023
Scorecard

Mumbai	v	Delhi
293 (79.2 overs); Sarfaraz Khan 125 (155); Pranshu Vijayran 4/66 (20 overs)		369 (101.1 overs); Vaibhav Rawal 114 (195); Tushar Deshpande 4/111 (24 overs)
170 (60.5 overs); Ajinkya Rahane 51 (104); Divij Mehra 5/30 (13 overs)		97/2 (15.3 overs); Hrithik Shokeen 36* (39); Mohit Avasthi 1/24 (2 overs)

Delhi won by 8 wickets
Arun Jaitley Stadium, Delhi
Umpires: Sundaram Ravi and Chettithody Shamshuddin
Player of the match: Vaibhav Rawal (Delhi)

- Delhi won the toss and elected to field.
- Vaibhav Sharma (Delhi) made his first-class debut.

17–19 January 2023
Scorecard

Maharashtra	v	Hyderabad
385 (96.2 overs); Naushad Shaikh 152 (241); Kartikeya Kak 7/91 (24 overs)		192 (86.3 overs); Rohit Rayudu 68 (186); Ashay Palkar 3/26 (15.3 overs)
30/1 (2.5 overs); Taranjitsingh Dhillon 30* (15); Kartikeya Kak 1/25 (1.5 overs)		219 (53.1 overs) (f/o); Chandan Sahani 59 (46); Satyajeet Bachhav 3/32 (7.1 overs)

Maharashtra won by 9 wickets
Maharashtra Cricket Association Stadium, Pune
Umpires: C. K. Nandan and Nikhil Patwardhan
Player of the match: Naushad Shaikh (Maharashtra)

- Hyderabad won the toss and elected to field.
- Rahul Radesh and P. Nitesh Reddy (Hyderabad) both made his first-class debuts.

=== Round 7 ===
24–26 January 2023
Scorecard

Assam	v	Andhra
113 (37.5 overs); Rishav Das 30 (56); M Madhav Rayudu 4/12 (4.5 overs)		361 (112 overs); Karan Shinde 90* (211); Swarupam Purkayastha 4/48 (20 overs)
153 (54.1 overs); Kunal Saikia 36 (92); Lalith Mohan 5/40 (18 overs)

Andhra won by an innings and 95 runs
Dr PVG Raju ACA Sports Complex, Vizianagaram
Umpires: Milind Bhatt and Mayur Wankhade
Player of the match: M Madhav Rayudu (Andhra)

- Assam won the toss and elected to bat.

24–27 January 2023
Scorecard

Hyderabad	v	Delhi
355 (124 overs); Rohit Rayudu 153* (295); Divij Mehra 3/45 (24 overs)		433 (100.5 overs); Ayush Badoni 191 (230); Gangam Anikethreddy 5/143 (34 overs)
124 (37.4 overs); Rohit Rayudu 32 (77); Harshit Rana 7/45 (12 overs)		47/1 (8.4 overs); Dhruv Shorey 23* (26); Kartikeya Kak 1/26 (4.4 overs)

Delhi won by 9 wickets
Rajiv Gandhi International Stadium, Hyderabad
Umpires: Sadashiv Iyer and Ranjeev Sharma
Player of the match: Harshit Rana (Delhi)

- Hyderabad won the toss and elected to bat.
- Shashank Lokesh and Praneeth Raj (Hyderabad) both made their first-class debuts.

24–27 January 2023
Scorecard

Maharashtra	v	Mumbai
384 (115 overs); Kedar Jadhav 128 (168); Mohit Avasthi 5/89 (27 overs)		384 (116 overs); Prasad Pawar 145 (262); Pradeep Dadhe 3/80 (25 overs)
252 (83.5 overs); Azim Kazi 75 (120); Shams Mulani 4/81 (37 overs)		195/6 (27.3 overs); Divyaansh Saxena 62 (48); Siddhesh Veer 2/26 (5 overs)

Match drawn
Brabourne Stadium, Mumbai
Umpires: Abhijit Deshmukh and Saidharshan Kumar
Player of the match: Prasad Pawar (Mumbai)

- Mumbai won the toss and elected to field.
- Divyaansh Saxena (Mumbai) made his first-class debut.

24–27 January 2023
Scorecard

Tamil Nadu	v	Saurashtra
324 (142.4 overs); Baba Indrajith 66 (216); Yuvrajsinh Dodiya 4/72 (27.4 overs)		192 (79.4 overs); Chirag Jani 49 (151); Ajith Ram 3/39 (15 overs)
133 (36.1 overs); Sai Sudharsan 37 (72); Ravindra Jadeja 7/53 (17.1 overs)		206 (68.2 overs); Harvik Desai 101 (205); Ajith Ram 6/54 (21 overs)

Tamil Nadu won by 59 runs
M. A. Chidambaram Stadium, Chennai
Umpires: Nitin Pandit and Navdeep Singh
Player of the match: Ajith Ram (Tamil Nadu)

- Tamil Nadu won the toss and elected to bat.
