= Amit Kumar (disambiguation) =

Amit Kumar (born 1952) is an Indian film playback singer, actor, director, and music director.

Amit Kumar may also refer to:

- Amit Kumar (academic) (born 1976), Indian computer scientist
- Amit Kumar (Bangladeshi cricketer) (born 1988)
- Amit Kumar (doctor), Indian medical doctor
- Amit Kumar (wrestler) (born 1993)
- Amit Kumar, director and writer of the 2013 Indian film Monsoon Shootout
- Amit Kumar Saroha (born 1985), Indian discus thrower
