= Rishith Reddy =

Indian cricketer (born 2003)

Personal information
- Full name: Nirvetla Rishith Reddy
- Born: 29 November 2003 (age 22)
- Batting: Right-handed
- Bowling: Right-arm medium

Domestic team information
- Years: Team
- 2022–present: Hyderabad
- Source: Cricinfo, 13 November 2022

Rishith Reddy (born 29 November 2003) is an Indian cricketer. He made his T20 debut on 22 October 2022, for Hyderabad against Manipur in the 2022–23 Syed Mushtaq Ali Trophy. He made his List A debut on 13 November 2022, for Hyderabad against Tripura in the 2022–23 Vijay Hazare Trophy.

In December 2021, he made his debut for the India U-19 team and took a five-wicket haul in the same match. He was also named in the India's squad as stand-by player for the 2022 Under-19 Cricket World Cup.
