= Palam B Ground =

Cricket ground in Palam, New Delhi

Palam B Stadium
Ground information
- Location: Palam Air Force Base, Delhi Cantonment, New Delhi
- Country: India
- Establishment: 1996
- Capacity: n/a
- End names
- n/a

Team information
Services cricket team	(1996-present)
- As of August 27, 2015; Source: Cricinfo

Palam B Stadium or Model Sports Complex is a cricket ground in Palam Air Force Base, Delhi Cantonment, New Delhi. The ground was established in 1996. The ground is home ground of the Services cricket team. Till date, the ground has hosted 10 List A matches and 10 Twenty20 matches.

== See also ==
- Palam A Stadium
