= Tunish Sawkar =

Indian cricketer (born 1998)

Personal information
- Full name: Tunish Tushar Sawkar
- Born: 25 September 1998 (age 28)
- Source: Cricinfo, 12 October 2019

Tunish Sawkar (born 25 September 1998) is an Indian cricketer. He made his List A debut on 12 October 2019, for Goa in the 2019–20 Vijay Hazare Trophy.
