= Bhuvanagiri Punnaiah =

Indian cricketer (born 2003)

Personal information
- Full name: Bhuvanagiri Punnaiah
- Born: 12 May 2003 (age 23)
- Batting: Right-handed
- Bowling: Right-arm medium
- Role: Bowler

Domestic team information
- Years: Team
- 2021/22–: Hyderabad
- Source: CricketArchive (subscription required), 19 December 2023

Bhuvanagiri Punnaiah (born 12 May 2003) is an Indian cricketer who came from an impoverished upbringing to play for Hyderabad as a righ-arm medium pace bowler. He made his first-class (FC) debut on 24 February 2022, for Hyderabad against Bengal in the 2021–22 Ranji Trophy. Later in the year, he made his Twenty20 (T20) debut on 11 October 2022, playing for Hyderabad against Punjab in the 2022–23 Syed Mushtaq Ali Trophy; and then his List A (LA) debut on 12 November 2022 for Hyderabad against Himachal Pradesh in the 2022–23 Vijay Hazare Trophy. To the end of 2023, Punnaiah has played in eleven senior matches for Hyderabad (four FC, four LA, and three T20). His best bowling return to date is 4/35 against Baroda at the Vikash Ground, Bhubaneswar in the 2021–22 Ranji Trophy.
