= Amit Kumar (academic) =

Indian computer scientist and academic (born 1976)

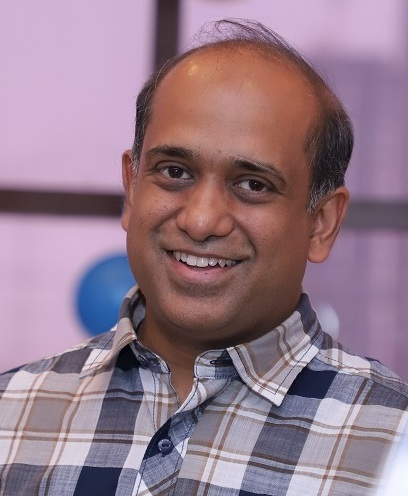
- Born: 29 January 1976 (age 50); Patna, Bihar, India
- Education: Indian Institute of Technology Kanpur(Bachelor's Degree); Cornell University(PhD)
- Awards: Shanti Swarup Bhatnagar Prize for Science and Technology (2018)
- Scientific career
- Fields: Algorithms; Combinatorial optimization Approximation algorithm
- Workplaces: Indian Institute of Technology Delhi (IIT Delhi)
- Doctoral advisor: Jon Kleinberg
- Website: www.cse.iitd.ernet.in/~amitk/

Amit Kumar (born 29 January 1976) is a professor in the Department of Computer Science and Engineering at the Indian Institute of Technology Delhi. He received his B.Tech. degree from Indian Institute of Technology Kanpur in 1997, and Ph.D. from Cornell University in 2002. He worked as member of technical staff at Bell Labs, Murray Hill, New Jersey, U.S. during 2002–2003. He joined IIT Delhi as faculty member in 2003. He works in the area of combinatorial optimization, approximation algorithms and online algorithms. He is working extensively on problems arising in scheduling theory, clustering, and graph theoretic algorithmic problems.

== Awards ==
He received Young Engineer Award from Indian National Academy of Engineering in 2006, and INSA Medal for Young Scientists from Indian National Science Academy in 2011. He was awarded the Shanti Swarup Bhatnagar Prize for Science and Technology in the mathematical sciences category in 2018.
