= Ramachandran Ragupathy =

Indian cricketer (born 1996)

Personal information
- Full name: Ramachandran Ram Ragupathy
- Born: 12 May 1996 (age 30)
- Source: Cricinfo, 12 February 2020

Ramachandran Ragupathy (born 12 May 1996) is an Indian cricketer. He made his first-class debut on 12 February 2020, for Puducherry in the 2019–20 Ranji Trophy. He made his List A debut on 1 March 2021, for Puducherry in the 2020–21 Vijay Hazare Trophy. He made his Twenty20 debut on 5 November 2021, for Puducherry in the 2021–22 Syed Mushtaq Ali Trophy.
