= 2022–23 Vijay Hazare Trophy =

Indian cricket tournament

- Dates: 12 November – 2 December 2022
- Administrator: BCCI
- Cricket format: List A cricket
- Tournament format(s): Round-robin and Playoff format
- Host: India
- Champions: Saurashtra (2nd title)
- Runners-up: Maharashtra
- Participants: 38
- Matches: 105
- Player of the series: Ruturaj Gaikwad (Maharashtra)
- Most runs: Narayan Jagadeesan (830) (Tamil Nadu)
- Most wickets: Jaydev Unadkat (19) (Saurashtra)

The 2022–23 Vijay Hazare Trophy was the 30th edition of the Vijay Hazare Trophy, an annual List A cricket tournament in India. It was played from 12 November to 2 December 2022. Himachal Pradesh were the defending champions. Saurashtra won the final match against Maharashtra by 5 wickets to clinch their second domestic title.

A total of 38 teams featured in five Elite groups. The group toppers progressed to the quarterfinals, while the second-placed sides and the best among the rest advanced to the pre-quarterfinals. The tournament was played in six cities across the country which are Bengaluru, Delhi, Kolkata, Mumbai, Ranchi, with all the knockout matches played in Ahmedabad.

On 21 November, Tamil Nadu's Narayan Jagadeesan set the highest-ever individual List A score with his 277 from 141 balls against Arunachal Pradesh, breaking the previous record of 268 by Ali Brown. Tamil Nadu's final score of 506/2 in that match was also a record for the highest-ever team total in a List A match, breaking England's 498/4 against the Netherlands set five months prior.

On 28 November, Ruturaj Gaikwad scored 43 runs of the second-last over of Maharashtra's innings against Uttar Pradesh in the second quarter-finals match, to equal the record for the most runs scored in an over in a List A match and also became the first batter to hit seven sixes in an over in all forms of cricket.

== League stage ==
=== Group A ===
Pos	Team	Pld	W	L	NR	Pts	NRR
1	Saurashtra	7	5	2	0	20	1.737
2	Uttar Pradesh	7	5	2	0	20	0.604
3	Hyderabad	7	5	2	0	20	0.513
4	Chandigarh	7	5	2	0	20	−0.031
5	Gujarat	7	3	4	0	12	0.162
6	Tripura	7	3	4	0	12	0.528
7	Himachal Pradesh	7	2	5	0	8	0.231
8	Manipur	7	0	7	0	0	−4.017

Source: ESPN Cricinfo
Rules for classification: 1) Points; 2) Head-to-head; 3) Net run rate.

Advances to Quarter-final
Advances to Preliminary quarter-final

=== Group B ===
Pos	Team	Pld	W	L	NR	Pts	NRR
1	Assam	7	6	1	0	24	1.360
2	Karnataka	7	6	1	0	24	1.721
3	Jharkhand	7	5	2	0	20	1.064
4	Rajasthan	7	4	3	0	16	0.952
5	Delhi	7	3	4	0	12	0.358
6	Vidarbha	7	3	4	0	12	0.455
7	Meghalaya	7	1	6	0	4	−2.669
8	Sikkim	7	0	7	0	0	−3.421

Source: ESPN Cricinfo
Rules for classification: 1) Points; 2) Head-to-head; 3) Net run rate.

Advances to Quarter-final
Advances to Preliminary quarter-final

=== Group C ===
Pos	Team	Pld	W	L	T	NR	Pts	NRR
1	Tamil Nadu	7	5	0	0	2	24	3.106
2	Kerala	7	4	1	0	2	20	1.809
3	Andhra Pradesh	7	4	2	0	1	18	1.066
4	Haryana	7	3	2	1	1	16	1.241
5	Chhattisgarh	7	3	3	0	1	14	0.362
6	Goa	7	2	3	1	1	12	0.252
7	Bihar	7	0	5	0	2	4	−2.550
8	Arunachal Pradesh	7	0	5	0	2	4	−6.159

Source: ESPN Cricinfo
Rules for classification: 1) Points; 2) Head-to-head; 3) Net run rate.

Advances to Quarter-final
Advances to Preliminary quarter-final

=== Group D ===
Pos	Team	Pld	W	L	NR	Pts	NRR
1	Punjab	6	6	0	0	24	1.759
2	Jammu and Kashmir	6	5	1	0	20	0.474
3	Madhya Pradesh	6	4	2	0	16	2.352
4	Baroda	6	3	3	0	12	−0.396
5	Uttarakhand	6	2	4	0	8	−0.186
6	Odisha	6	1	5	0	4	−0.537
7	Nagaland	6	0	6	0	0	−3.312

Source: ESPN Cricinfo
Rules for classification: 1) Points; 2) Head-to-head; 3) Net run rate.

Advances to Quarter-final
Advances to Preliminary quarter-final

=== Group E ===
Pos	Team	Pld	W	L	NR	Pts	NRR
1	Maharashtra	6	6	0	0	24	1.498
2	Mumbai	6	4	2	0	16	1.388
3	Bengal	6	4	2	0	16	1.058
4	Railways	6	3	3	0	12	0.786
5	Pondicherry	6	2	4	0	8	−0.702
6	Services	6	2	4	0	8	−0.249
7	Mizoram	6	0	6	0	0	−4.021

Source: ESPN Cricinfo
Rules for classification: 1) Points; 2) Head-to-head; 3) Net run rate.

Advances to Quarter-final
Advances to Preliminary quarter-final

== Knockout stage ==
Preliminary QF
B2	Karnataka	188/5 (40.5 overs)
B3	Jharkhand	187 (47.1 overs)
A2	Uttar Pradesh	221/2 (45.4 overs)
E2	Mumbai	220 (48.3 overs)
D2	Jammu and Kashmir	175/3 (37.5 overs)
C2	Kerala	174 (47.4 overs)

Quarter-finals
D1	Punjab	235 (50 overs)
B2	Karnataka	238/6 (49.2 overs)
C1	Tamil Nadu	249 (48 overs)
A1	Saurashtra	293/8 (50 overs)
E1	Maharashtra	330/5 (50 overs)
A2	Uttar Pradesh	272 (47.4 overs)
B1	Assam	354/3 (46.1 overs)
D2	Jammu and Kashmir	350/7 (50 overs)

Semi-finals
B2	Karnataka	171 (49.1 overs)
A1	Saurashtra	172/5 (36.2 overs)
E1	Maharashtra	350/7 (50 overs)
B1	Assam	338/8 (50 overs)

Final
A1	Saurashtra	249/5 (46.3 overs)
E1	Maharashtra	248/9 (50 overs)

=== Preliminary quarter-finals ===
Preliminary quarter-final 1
26 November 2022
Scorecard

Jharkhand; 187 (47.1 overs)	v	Karnataka; 188/5 (40.5 overs)
Kumar Kushagra 74 (80); Vidhwath Kaverappa 3/20 (8.1 overs)		Nikin Jose 63* (93); Rahul Shukla 2/44 (9 overs)

Karnataka won by 5 wickets
Narendra Modi Stadium, Ahmedabad
Umpires: Saiyed Khalid and Tapan Sharma

- Karnataka won the toss and elected to field.
- Arnav Sinha (Jharkhand) made his List A debut.

Preliminary quarter-final 2
26 November 2022
Scorecard

Mumbai; 220 (48.3 overs)	v	Uttar Pradesh; 221/2 (45.4 overs)
Hardik Tamore 53 (67); Shivam Mavi 4/41 (9.3 overs)		Aryan Juyal 82 (103); Divyaansh Saxena 1/25 (4.4 overs)

Uttar Pradesh won by 8 wickets
Narendra Modi Stadium
Umpires: Abhijit Deshmukh and Nikhil Patwardhan

- Uttar Pradesh won the toss and elected to field.
- Suved Parkar and Divyaansh Saxena (Mumbai) both made their List A debuts.

Preliminary quarter-final 3
26 November 2022
Scorecard

Kerala; 174 (47.4 overs)	v	Jammu and Kashmir; 175/3 (37.5 overs)
Vinoop Manoharan 62 (81); Auqib Nabi 4/39 (10 overs)		Shubham Khajuria 76 (61); Sijomon Joseph 2/19 (10 overs)

Jammu and Kashmir won by 7 wickets
Gujarat College Ground, Ahmedabad
Umpires: Anil Chaudhary and Akshay Totre

- Jammu and Kashmir won the toss and elected to field.

=== Quarter-finals ===
1st Quarter-final
28 November 2022
Scorecard

Punjab; 235 (50 overs)	v	Karnataka; 238/6 (49.2 overs)
Abhishek Sharma 109 (123); Vidhwath Kaverappa 4/40 (10 overs)		Ravikumar Samarth 71 (106); Sanvir Singh 2/28 (10 overs)

Karnataka won by 4 wickets
Narendra Modi Stadium, Ahmedabad
Umpires: Ulhas Gandhe and Sanjay Kumar Singh
Player of the match: Vidhwath Kaverappa (Karnataka)

- Karnataka won the toss and elected to field.

2nd Quarter-final
28 November 2022
Scorecard

Maharashtra; 330/5 (50 overs)	v	Uttar Pradesh; 272 (47.4 overs)
Ruturaj Gaikwad 220* (159); Kartik Tyagi 3/66 (10 overs)		Aryan Juyal 159 (143); Rajvardhan Hangargekar 5/53 (10 overs)

Maharashtra won by 58 runs
Narendra Modi Stadium
Umpires: Nikhil Patwardhan and Virender Sharma
Player of the match: Ruturaj Gaikwad (Maharashtra)

- Uttar Pradesh won the toss and elected to field.
- Ruturaj Gaikwad (Maharashtra) scored his maiden List A double century.

3rd Quarter-final
28 November 2022
Scorecard

Jammu and Kashmir; 350/7 (50 overs)	v	Assam; 354/3 (46.1 overs)
Henan Nazir 124 (113); Avinov Choudhury 2/47 (10 overs)		Riyan Parag 174 (116); Auqib Nabi 1/44 (8 overs)

Assam won by 7 wickets
Gujarat College Ground, Ahmedabad
Umpires: Anil Chaudhary and Akshay Totre

- Assam won the toss and elected to field.

4th Quarter-final
28 November 2022
Scorecard

Saurashtra; 293/8 (50 overs)	v	Tamil Nadu; 249 (48 overs)
Harvik Desai 61 (78); Ravisrinivasan Sai Kishore 2/40 (10 overs)		Ravisrinivasan Sai Kishore 74 (92); Chirag Jani 3/53 (9 overs)

Saurashtra won by 44 runs
GS Patel Stadium, Nadiad
Umpires: Abhijit Deshmukh and Saiyed Khalid

- Tamil Nadu won the toss and elected to field.
- Jay Gohil (Saurashtra) made his List A debut.

=== Semi-finals ===
1st Semi-final
30 November 2022
Scorecard

Karnataka; 171 (49.1 overs)	v	Saurashtra; 172/5 (36.2 overs)
Ravikumar Samarth 88 (135); Jaydev Unadkat 4/26 (10 overs)		Jay Gohil 61 (82); Krishnappa Gowtham 2/50 (9.2 overs)

Saurashtra won by 5 wickets
Narendra Modi Stadium, Ahmedabad
Umpires: Ulhas Gandhe and Akshay Totre
Player of the match: Jaydev Unadkat (Saurashtra)

- Saurashtra won the toss and elected to field.

2nd Semi-final
30 November 2022
Scorecard

Maharashtra; 350/7 (50 overs)	v	Assam; 338/8 (50 overs)
Ruturaj Gaikwad 168 (126); Mukhtar Hussain 3/42 (9 overs)		Swarupam Purkayastha 95 (87); Rajvardhan Hangargekar 4/65 (10 overs)

Maharashtra won by 12 runs
Narendra Modi Stadium
Umpires: Anil Chaudhary and Sanjay Kumar Singh
Player of the match: Rajvardhan Hangargekar (Maharashtra)

- Assam won the toss and elected to field.

=== Final ===
2 December 2022
Scorecard

Maharashtra; 248/9 (50 overs)	v	Saurashtra; 249/5 (46.3 overs)
Ruturaj Gaikwad 108 (131); Chirag Jani 3/43 (10 overs)		Sheldon Jackson 133* (136); Vicky Ostwal 2/20 (10 overs)

Saurashtra won by 5 wickets
Narendra Modi Stadium, Ahmedabad
Umpires: Virender Sharma and Akshay Totre
Player of the match: Sheldon Jackson (Saurashtra)

- Saurashtra won the toss and elected to field.

== See also ==
- 2022-23 Ranji Trophy
- 2022-23 Syed Mushtaq Ali Trophy
