= Nawab Mansur Ali Khan Pataudi Sports Complex, Jamia Millia Islamia =

Cricket ground in Delhi, India

Coordinates: 28.563°N 77.279°E

- Bhopal Ground
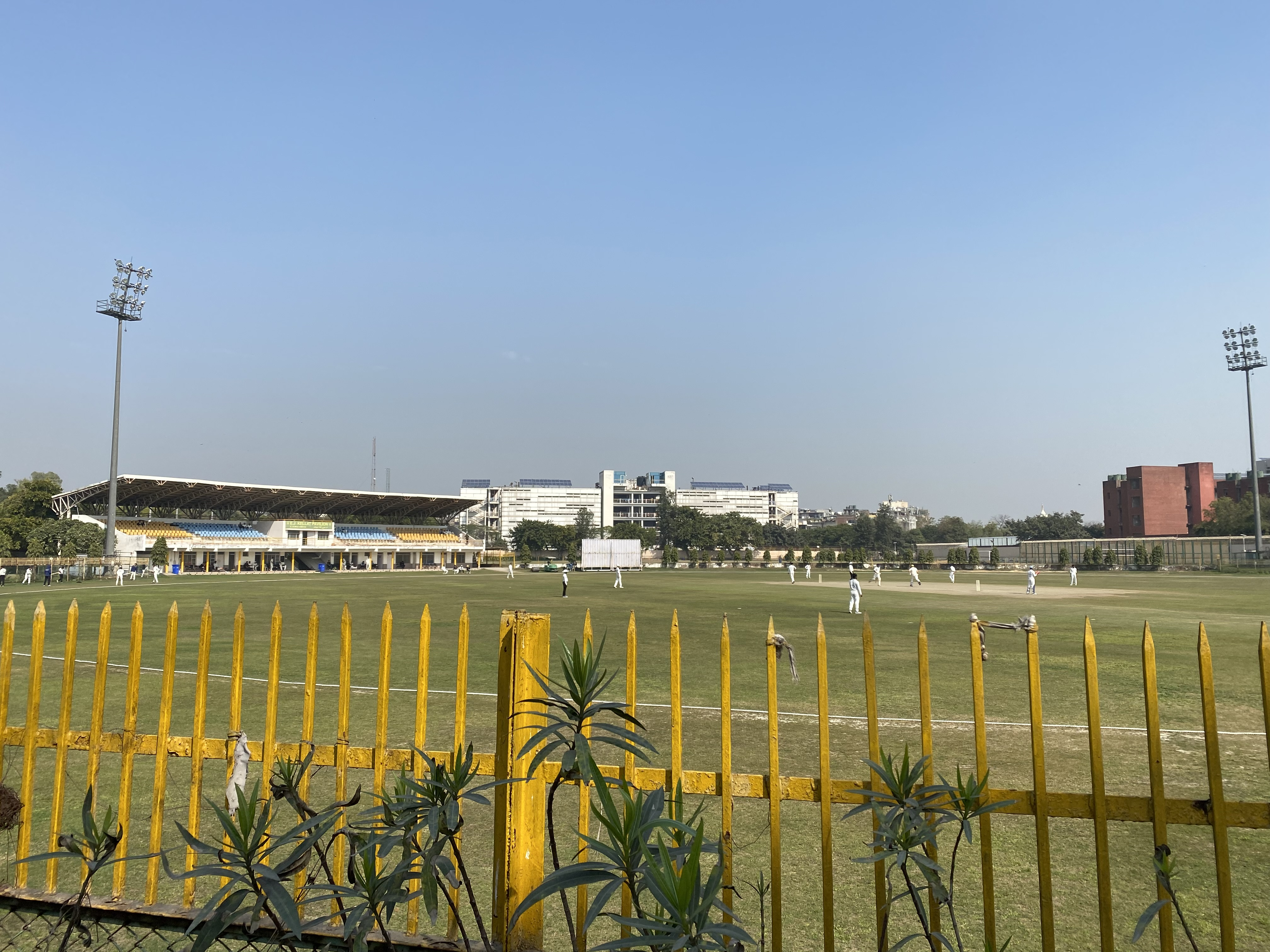
- A view of the cricket ground at M.K Pataudi Sports Complex
- Interactive map of Nawab Mansur Ali Khan Pataudi Sports Complex, Jamia Millia Islamia

Ground information
- Location: Okhla, Delhi, India
- Country: India
- Establishment: 1989

International information
- Only women's Test: 21 November 2005: India v England
- Only women's ODI: 17 December 1997: Netherlands v Sri Lanka
- As of 9 December 2019; Source: ESPNcricinfo

Nawab Mansur Ali Khan Pataudi Sports Complex, also known as the M. K. Pataudi Sports Complex, is a cricket ground and multi-sport complex located within the campus of Jamia Millia Islamia University in Delhi, India. Established in 1989, it is considered one of the best playing surfaces in Delhi. The ground is sometimes colloquially referred to as the “Bhopal Ground” owing to historical ties with the Bhopal royal family. Unusually, the ground features brick sightscreens.

The ground was host to a one day international during the 1997 Women's Cricket World Cup, with the Netherlands defeating Sri Lanka by 47 runs. In 2005, the ground hosted its first Test match: the match, a women's match between India and England, was drawn. The complex has also hosted several Ranji Trophy matches, and is used for the university’s inter-department tournaments.

== History ==
The sports complex is part of the campus grounds of Jamia Millia Islamia, and is also known as the “Bhopal Ground” because the land was donated by Sajida Sultan, the Begum of Bhopal and mother of the cricketer‐royalty Nawab Mansur Ali Khan Pataudi. In 2016, the university formally renamed the facility to the “Nawab Mansur Ali Khan Pataudi Sports Complex”, in honour of Pataudi’s achievements in Indian cricket. During the unveiling, a pavilion was also named after alumnus Virender Sehwag.

The ground underwent major upgrades in the lead-up to the 2010 Commonwealth Games — transitioning from a basic “dust-bowl” matting-wicket surface into a turf wicket of international standard, and adding improved outdoor and indoor facilities, including flood-lit basketball and lawn-tennis courts, a jogging track, indoor stadiums and a gallery for spectators.

== Facilities ==
The Nawab Mansur Ali Khan Pataudi Sports Complex offers a variety of sports and recreational facilities catering to students, faculty, and the broader community. These amenities support both inter-departmental competitions and individual fitness activities.

Outdoor Facilities:

1. Cricket Ground: A full-sized turf wicket suitable for inter-university matches and practice sessions.
2. Football Ground: A standard field used for university-level competitions and training.
3. Lawn Tennis Courts: Multiple courts available for recreational play and tournaments.
4. Basketball Courts: Both indoor and outdoor courts facilitate regular practice and inter-departmental matches.
5. Volleyball Court: An outdoor court used for university events and recreational play.
6. Jogging Track: A dedicated path for walking and running, promoting fitness among students and staff.
7. Athletics Facilities: Includes areas for track and field events, supporting inter-departmental competitions.

Indoor Facilities:

1. Indoor Games Stadium: Equipped with facilities for badminton, table tennis, and other indoor sports, the stadium also includes a viewers' gallery.
2. Fitness Centre: A well-equipped gymnasium catering to the fitness needs of students and staff.
3. Snooker Room: Provides recreational options for indoor sports enthusiasts.
4. Cafeteria: Offers refreshments and meals to visitors and participants.
5. Changing Rooms and Washrooms: Separate facilities for men and women, including accessible washrooms for disabled individuals.
6. Conference Room and Waiting Lounge: Spaces available for meetings and relaxation.

== See also ==
- Jamia Millia Islamia
- Mansur Ali Khan Pataudi
- Sports in Delhi
