= Belur Ravi =

Indian cricket umpire (born 1965)

Personal information
- Born: 17 November 1965 (age 60); Bangalore, India

Umpiring information
- WODIs umpired: 6 (2014–2021)
- WT20Is umpired: 5 (2012–2021)
- Source: ESPNcricinfo, 28 May 2014

Belur Keshavamurthy Ravi (born 17 November 1965) is an Indian cricket umpire. He has stood in games in the 2015–16 Ranji Trophy.
