= Bhavesh Seth =

Indian cricketer (born 1997)

Personal information
- Born: 7 October 1997 (age 29)
- Batting: Right-handed
- Role: Wicket-keeper

Domestic team information
- Years: Team
- 2022–present: Hyderabad
- Source: ESPNcricinfo, 13 November 2022

Bhavesh Seth (born 7 October 1997) is an Indian cricketer who plays as a wicketkeeper. He made his T20 debut on 18 October 2022, for Hyderabad against Delhi in the 2022–23 Syed Mushtaq Ali Trophy. He made his List A debut on 12 November 2022, for Hyderabad against Himachal Pradesh in the 2022–23 Vijay Hazare Trophy. He made his First class debut on 27 December 2022, for Hyderabad against Assam in the 2022-23 Ranji trophy.
