= Kathan Patel =

Indian cricketer (born 1996)

Personal information
- Full name: Kathan Dinesh Patel
- Born: 31 October 1996 (age 30); Ahmedabad, Gujarat, India

Domestic team information
- Years: Team
- 2017-present: Gujarat

Career statistics
Competition	FC	LA
Matches	8	7
Runs scored	500	64
Batting average	33.33	10.66
100s/50s	2/2	0/0
Top score	107	36
Balls bowled	12	108
Wickets	0	5
Bowling average	–	14.20
5 wickets in innings	–	0
10 wickets in match	–	n/a
Best bowling	–	3/42
Catches/stumpings	11/–	2/–
- Source: ESPNcricinfo, 28 December 2019

Kathan Patel (born 31 October 1996) is an Indian cricketer. He made his List A debut for Gujarat in the 2017–18 Vijay Hazare Trophy on 11 February 2018.
