= Rohit Rayudu =

Indian cricketer (born 1994)

Personal information
- Full name: Kolagani Rohit Rayudu
- Born: 29 July 1994 (age 32); Guntur, Andhra Pradesh, India
- Batting: Left-handed
- Bowling: Right-arm offbreak
- Relatives: Ambati Rayudu (cousin)

Domestic team information
- Years: Team
- 2017-present: Hyderabad

Career statistics
Competition	FC	LA	T20
Matches	9	22	6
Runs scored	446	815	65
Batting average	37.16	42.89	21.66
100s/50s	1/3	3/3	0/0
Top score	103	130	47*
Balls bowled	133	185	–
Wickets	2	7	–
Bowling average	50.00	22.14	–
5 wickets in innings	0	0	–
10 wickets in match	0	0	–
Best bowling	1/22	2/11	–
Catches/stumpings	2/–	10/–	2/–
- Source: Cricinfo, 6 May 2020

Kolagani Rohit Rayudu (born 29 July 1994) is an Indian cricketer. He made his first-class debut for Hyderabad in the 2017–18 Ranji Trophy on 1 November 2017. He made his List A debut for Hyderabad in the 2017–18 Vijay Hazare Trophy on 5 February 2018.

He was the leading run-scorer for Hyderabad in the 2018–19 Vijay Hazare Trophy, with 398 runs in eight matches. In October 2018, he was named in India B's squad for the 2018–19 Deodhar Trophy. He made his Twenty20 debut for Hyderabad against Puducherry in the 2018–19 Syed Mushtaq Ali Trophy on 21 February 2019.
