= Bhagath Varma =

Indian cricketer (born 1998)

Kanumuri Bhagath Varma
Personal information
- Born: 21 September 1998 (age 28); Hyderabad, Telangana, India
- Batting: Right-handed
- Bowling: Right arm off break

Domestic team information
- Years: Team
- 2021–present: Hyderabad
- Source: ESPNcricinfo, 13 November 2022

Kanumuri Bhagath Varma (born 21 September 1998) is an Indian cricketer. He made his T20 debut on 12 October 2022, for Hyderabad against Puducherry in the 2022–23 Syed Mushtaq Ali Trophy.

In February 2022, he was bought by the Chennai Super Kings in the auction for the 2022 Indian Premier League tournament.
