= Baltej Singh =

Indian cricketer (born 1990)

Personal information
- Full name: Baltej Singh Dhanda
- Born: 4 November 1990 (age 36); Ludhiana, Punjab, India
- Height: 1.93 m (6 ft 4 in)
- Role: Bowler
- Source: ESPNcricinfo, 23 October 2015

Baltej Singh (born 4 November 1990) is an Indian cricketer who plays for Punjab. He made his Twenty20 debut on 2 January 2016 in the 2015–16 Syed Mushtaq Ali Trophy. In February 2022, he was bought by the Punjab Kings in the auction for the 2022 Indian Premier League tournament.

He was part of the Punjab team that won the Syed Mushtaq Ali Trophy in 2022–23. In 2025, he announced his retirement from Indian cricket.
