= Rana Dutta =

Indian cricketer (born 1989)

Personal information
- Born: 15 May 1989 (age 37); Udaipur, Tripura, India
- Source: Cricinfo, 11 October 2015

Rana Dutta (born 15 May 1989) is an Indian first-class cricketer who plays for Tripura. In October 2016 in the 2016–17 Ranji Trophy, he took a hat-trick against Himachal Pradesh.

== See also ==
- List of hat-tricks in the Ranji Trophy
