= 2022–23 Syed Mushtaq Ali Trophy =

Indian cricket tournament

- Dates: 11 October – 5 November 2022
- Administrator(s): BCCI
- Cricket format: T20
- Tournament format(s): Round robin, then knockout
- Champions: Mumbai (1st title)
- Participants: 38
- Matches: 136
- Most runs: Yash Dhull (363) (Delhi)
- Most wickets: Siddarth Kaul (19) (Punjab)
- Official website: http://www.bcci.tv

The 2022–23 Syed Mushtaq Ali Trophy was the fifteenth edition of the Syed Mushtaq Ali Trophy, an annual Twenty20 tournament in India. Played from 11 October to 5 November 2022, it was contested by all 38 Ranji Trophy teams. Mumbai beat Himachal Pradesh by four wickets in the final to win their first title. The tournament was part of the 2022–23 Indian domestic cricket season, which was announced by the Board of Control for Cricket in India (BCCI) in August 2022. Tamil Nadu were the defending champions.

The tournament was divided into five groups, with eight teams in Groups A, B, and C, and seven teams in Groups D and E. The winners of each group progressed directly to the quarter-finals, while the second-placed team in each group and the third-placed team with the best record across the five groups qualified for the preliminary quarter-finals. The tournament was played in six cities across the country, with Indore, Jaipur, Lucknow, Mohali, and Rajkot hosting the group stage, and Kolkata hosting all of the knockout matches.

On 11 October, following the introduction of the Impact Player rule, Delhi's Hrithik Shokeen was the first utilised impact player, replacing Hiten Dalal in their match against Manipur.

== New Rules ==
=== Impact Player ===
- Along with the starting XI, teams would name four substitutes in their team sheet at the toss, and use one of the four during the match.
- The player can replace any member of the starting XI at any point before the end of the 14th over of either innings, and would be able to bat and bowl his full allotment of overs.
- The tactical scope of the Impact Player rule is vast, with no real restriction on the role he can play. For example, the Impact Player can replace a batter who has already been dismissed, and still get to bat - as long as the team only uses 11 batters or he could replace a bowler who has already sent down a few overs and still get to bowl his full four-over quota.

== Player transfers ==
The following player transfers were approved ahead of the season.

Player	From	To
Varun Aaron	Jharkhand	Baroda
Sudip Chatterjee	Bengal	Tripura
Shreevats Goswami	Bengal	Mizoram
Arun Karthik	Tamil Nadu	Pondicherry
Siddhesh Lad	Mumbai	Goa
Ambati Rayudu	Andhra	Baroda
Abhishek Reddy	Karnataka	Andhra
Wriddhiman Saha	Bengal	Tripura
Ankit Sharma	Madhya Pradesh	Pondicherry
Jiwanjot Singh	Chhattisgarh	Uttarakhand
Aditya Tare	Mumbai	Uttarakhand
Arjun Tendulkar	Mumbai	Goa
Hanuma Vihari	Hyderabad	Andhra
Avinash Yadav	Railways	Mizoram

== League stage ==
=== Group A ===
Pos	Team	Pld	W	L	NR	Pts	NRR
1	Mumbai	7	6	1	0	24	1.448
2	Vidarbha	7	5	2	0	20	0.829
3	Uttarakhand	7	4	3	0	16	1.272
4	Assam	7	4	3	0	16	−0.010
5	Railways	7	3	4	0	12	0.257
6	Rajasthan	7	3	4	0	12	0.179
7	Madhya Pradesh	7	3	4	0	12	0.113
8	Mizoram	7	0	7	0	0	−4.139

Updated to match(es) played on 22 October 2022. Source: ESPN Cricinfo

Advanced to Quarter-final
Advanced to Preliminary quarter-final

=== Group B ===
Pos	Team	Pld	W	L	NR	Pts	NRR
1	Delhi	7	6	1	0	24	1.187
2	Punjab	7	6	1	0	24	2.838
3	Uttar Pradesh	7	4	3	0	16	0.546
4	Goa	7	4	3	0	16	0.061
5	Hyderabad	7	4	3	0	16	−0.167
6	Tripura	7	3	4	0	12	0.087
7	Manipur	7	1	6	0	4	−2.872
8	Pondicherry	7	0	7	0	0	−1.524

Updated to match(es) played on 22 October 2022. Source: ESPN Cricinfo

Advanced to Quarter-final
Advanced to Preliminary quarter-final

=== Group C ===
Pos	Team	Pld	W	L	NR	Pts	NRR
1	Karnataka	7	6	1	0	24	2.216
2	Kerala	7	5	2	0	20	1.402
3	Haryana	7	5	2	0	20	1.214
4	Services	7	5	2	0	20	0.789
5	Maharashtra	7	4	3	0	16	0.515
6	Meghalaya	7	2	5	0	8	−1.846
7	Jammu and Kashmir	7	1	6	0	4	0.329
8	Arunachal Pradesh	7	0	7	0	0	−5.217

Updated to match(es) played on 22 October 2022. Source: ESPN Cricinfo

Advanced to Quarter-final
Advanced to Preliminary quarter-final

=== Group D ===
Pos	Team	Pld	W	L	NR	Pts	NRR
1	Himachal Pradesh	6	4	0	2	20	2.053
2	Saurashtra	6	4	1	1	18	1.568
3	Gujarat	6	4	1	1	18	1.673
4	Baroda	6	3	3	0	12	0.515
5	Andhra Pradesh	6	2	2	2	12	−0.133
6	Bihar	6	1	5	0	4	−1.480
7	Nagaland	6	0	6	0	0	−3.108

Updated to match(es) played on 22 October 2022. Source: ESPN Cricinfo

Advanced to Quarter-final
Advanced to Preliminary quarter-final

=== Group E ===
Pos	Team	Pld	W	L	NR	Pts	NRR
1	Bengal	6	4	1	1	18	2.043
2	Chhattisgarh	6	4	1	1	18	1.600
3	Tamil Nadu	6	4	2	0	16	0.863
4	Jharkhand	6	2	2	2	12	1.869
5	Chandigarh	6	3	3	0	12	0.282
6	Odisha	6	2	4	0	8	−1.502
7	Sikkim	6	0	6	0	0	−4.316

Updated to match(es) played on 22 October 2022. Source: ESPN Cricinfo

Advanced to Quarter-final
Advanced to Preliminary quarter-final

== Knockout stage ==
Preliminary QF
B2	Punjab	176/7 (20 overs)
C3	Haryana	127/8 (20 overs)
A2	Vidarbha	112/5 (18.4 overs)
E2	Chhattisgarh	111/9 (20 overs)
C2	Kerala	174/4 (20 overs)
D2	Saurashtra	183/6 (20 overs)

Quarter-finals
C1	Karnataka	216/6 (20 overs)
B2	Punjab	225/4 (20 overs)
D1	Himachal Pradesh	200/6 (20 overs)
E1	Bengal	199/6 (20 overs)
B1	Delhi	156/6 (20 overs)
A2	Vidarbha	157/5 (20 overs)
A1	Mumbai	168/8 (19.3 overs)
D2	Saurashtra	166/8 (20 overs)

Semi-finals
B2	Punjab	163/7 (20 overs)
D1	Himachal Pradesh	176/7 (20 overs)
A2	Vidarbha	164/7 (20 overs)
A1	Mumbai	169/5 (16.5 overs)

Final
D1	Himachal Pradesh	143/8 (20 overs)
A1	Mumbai	146/7 (19.3 overs)

=== Preliminary quarter-finals ===
Preliminary quarter-final 1
30 October 2022
Scorecard

Punjab; 176/7 (20 overs)	v	Haryana; 127/8 (20 overs)
Prabhsimran Singh 64 (36); Anshul Kamboj 3/25 (4 overs)		Nishant Sindhu 42 (25); Baltej Singh 3/20 (4 overs)

Punjab won by 49 runs
Eden Gardens, Kolkata
Umpires: Vineet Kulkarni and Nikhil Patwardhan

- Haryana won the toss and elected to field.
- Impact Player Subs: Ashwani Kumar for Shubman Gill (Punjab) and Piyush Dahiya for Yuvraj Singh (Haryana).

Preliminary quarter-final 2
30 October 2022
Scorecard

Chhattisgarh; 111/9 (20 overs)	v	Vidarbha; 112/5 (18.4 overs)
Harpreet Singh Bhatia 27 (24); Umesh Yadav 3/27 (4 overs)		Sanjay Raghunath 63 (52); Sumit Ruikar 1/17 (4 overs)

Vidarbha won by 5 wickets
Jadavpur University Campus Ground, Kolkata
Umpires: Sadashiv Iyer and Chirra Ravikanthreddy

- Vidarbha won the toss and elected to field.
- Impact Player Subs: Akshay Wakhare for Aditya Sarwate (Vidarbha) and Sanjeet Desai for Akhil Herwadkar (Chhattisgarh).

Preliminary quarter-final 3
30 October 2022
Scorecard

Saurashtra; 183/6 (20 overs)	v	Kerala; 174/4 (20 overs)
Sheldon Jackson 64 (44); KM Asif 3/33 (4 overs)		Sachin Baby 64 (47); Prerak Mankad 2/26 (3 overs)

Saurashtra won by 9 runs
Eden Gardens, Kolkata
Umpires: Saiyed Khalid and Vineet Kulkarni

- Saurashtra won the toss and elected to bat.
- Impact Player Subs: Sudhesan Midhun for Vaisakh Chandran (Kerala) and Visvaraj Jadeja for Harvik Desai (Saurashtra).

=== Quarter-finals ===
1st Quarter-final
1 November 2022
Scorecard

Punjab; 225/4 (20 overs)	v	Karnataka; 216/6 (20 overs)
Shubman Gill 126 (55); Vidhwath Kaverappa 3/44 (4 overs)		Abhinav Manohar 62* (29); Ramandeep Singh 2/26 (2 overs)

Punjab won by 9 runs
Eden Gardens, Kolkata
Umpires: Sadashiv Iyer and Nand Kishore

- Karnataka won the toss and elected to field.
- Rohan Patil (Karnataka) made his T20 debut.
- Impact Player Subs: Ashwani Kumar for Shubman Gill (Punjab) and Rohan Patil for Vijaykumar Vyshak (Karnataka).

2nd Quarter-final
1 November 2022
Scorecard

Vidarbha; 157/5 (20 overs)	v	Delhi; 156/6 (20 overs)
Akshay Wadkar 63 (53); Mayank Yadav 1/16 (2 overs)		Yash Dhull 39* (40); Yash Thakur 4/29 (4 overs)

Vidarbha won by 1 run
Jadavpur University Campus Ground, Kolkata
Umpires: Jayaraman Madanagopal and Chirra Ravikanthreddy

- Delhi won the toss and elected to field.
- Impact Player Subs: Harsh Dubey for Shubham Dubey (Vidarbha) and Mayank Yadav for Navdeep Saini (Delhi).

3rd Quarter-final
1 November 2022
Scorecard

Bengal; 199/6 (20 overs)	v	Himachal Pradesh; 200/6 (20 overs)
Shahbaz Ahmed 59 (32); Kanwar Abhinay 4/47 (4 overs)		Akash Vasisht 76* (42); Ravi Kumar 2/29 (3 overs)

Himachal Pradesh won by 4 wickets
Videocon Academy Ground, Kolkata
Umpires: Saiyed Khalid and Vineet Kulkarni

- Impact Player Subs: Karan Lal for Ranjot Khaira (Bengal) and Nitin Sharma for Ankush Bains (Himachal Pradesh).

4th Quarter-final
1 November 2022
Scorecard

Saurashtra; 166/8 (20 overs)	v	Mumbai; 168/8 (19.3 overs)
Prerak Mankad 61 (25); Tushar Deshpande 3/37 (4 overs)		Shreyas Iyer 40 (30); Chetan Sakariya 4/33 (4 overs)

Mumbai won by 2 wickets
Eden Gardens, Kolkata
Umpires: Nand Kishore and Nikhil Patwardhan

- Saurashtra won the toss and elected to bat.
- Impact Player Subs: Visvaraj Jadeja for Harvik Desai (Saurashtra) and Sairaj Patil for Prithvi Shaw (Mumbai).

=== Semi-finals ===
1st Semi-final
3 November 2022
Scorecard

Himachal Pradesh; 176/7 (20 overs)	v	Punjab; 163/7 (20 overs)
Sumeet Verma 51 (25); Sanvir Singh 2/17 (2 overs)		Shubman Gill 45 (32); Rishi Dhawan 3/25 (4 overs)

Himachal Pradesh won by 13 runs
Eden Gardens, Kolkata
Umpires: Nand Kishore and Jayaraman Madanagopal

- Punjab won the toss and elected to field.
- Impact Player Subs: Abhimanyu Rana for Prashant Chopra (Himachal Pradesh) and Pukhraj Mann for Prabhsimran Singh (Punjab).

2nd Semi-final
3 November 2022
Scorecard

Vidarbha; 164/7 (20 overs)	v	Mumbai; 169/5 (16.5 overs)
Jitesh Sharma 46* (24); Shams Mulani 3/20 (4 overs)		Shreyas Iyer 73 (44); Akshay Karnewar 2/24 (3 overs)

Mumbai won by 5 wickets
Eden Gardens, Kolkata
Umpires: Sadashiv Iyer and Saiyed Khalid

- Vidarbha won the toss and elected to bat.
- Impact Player Sub: Lalit Yadav for Shubham Dubey (Vidarbha).

=== Final ===
5 November 2022
Scorecard

Himachal Pradesh; 143/8 (20 overs)	v	Mumbai; 146/7 (19.3 overs)
Ekant Sen 37 (29); Tanush Kotian 3/15 (4 overs)		Sarfaraz Khan 36* (31); Vaibhav Arora 3/27 (4 overs)

Mumbai won by 3 wickets
Eden Gardens, Kolkata
Umpires: Jayaraman Madanagopal and Nikhil Patwardhan
Player of the match: Tanush Kotian (Mumbai)

- Mumbai won the toss and elected to field.
- Sidharth Sharma (Himachal Pradesh) made his T20 debut.
- Impact Player Sub: Nitin Sharma for Nikhil Gangta (Himachal Pradesh).
