= Palam A Stadium =

Cricket ground in New Delhi, India

Ground information
- Location: Dwarka Road, Sport View, Palam Air Force Base, Delhi Cantonment, Delhi
- Country: India
- Coordinates: 28°34′17″N 77°07′22″E
- Establishment: 1958
- Capacity: n/a
- End names
- n/a

Team information
Services cricket team	(1958–present)
- As of 27 August 2015; Source: Cricinfo

Palam A Stadium, also known as Air Force Station or Model Sports Complex, is a cricket ground in Dwarka Road, Sport View, Palam Air Force Base, Delhi Cantonment, New Delhi.

The ground was established in 1958, and since then it has been regular venue for cricket for the Services cricket team. The ground has also hosted few matches for the Delhi and Railways cricket teams. As of early February 2025 it has held 149 first-class matches, 69 List A matches and 52 Twenty20 matches. In 2011, the International Cricket Council approved the ground for use as a practice venue for the World Cup; 19 practice sessions took place there.

The ground is very close to Indira Gandhi International Airport, and planes approaching the airport fly low about 100 metres south of the ground before coming in to land on the other side of Dwarka Road. Although the ground is used for Ranji Trophy matches, public entry is restricted, as the ground is within Delhi Cantt area.
