= Sanvir Singh =

Indian cricketer (born 1996)

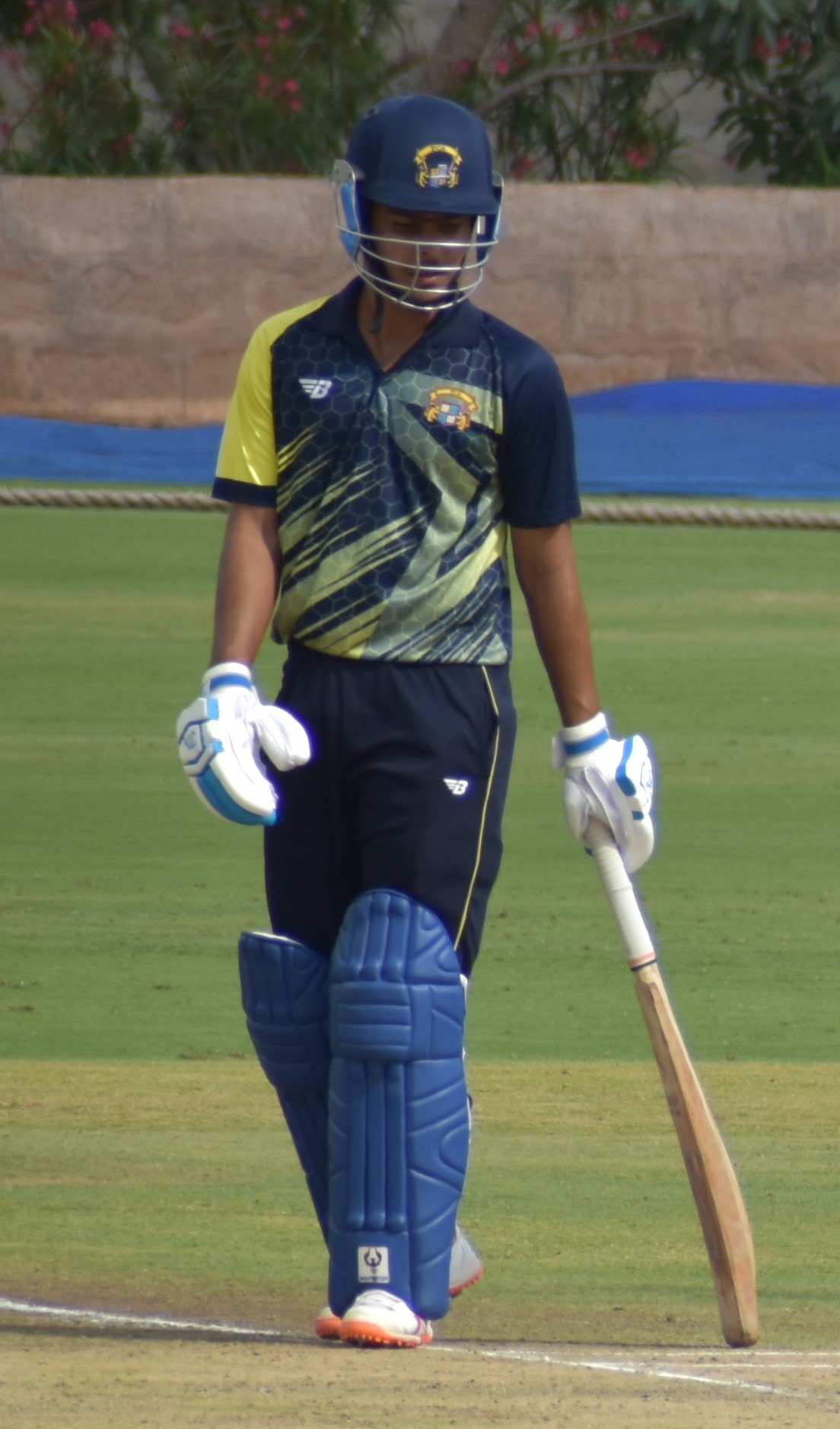

Personal information
- Born: 12 October 1996 (age 30); Ludhiana, Punjab, India
- Batting: Right-handed
- Bowling: Right arm medium
- Role: All-rounder

Domestic team information
- Years: Team
- 2018–present: Punjab
- 2023–2024: Sunrisers Hyderabad
- FC debut: 01 November 2018 Punjab v Andhra Pradesh
- LA debut: 28 September 2018 Punjab v Mumbai

Career statistics
Competition	FC	List A	T20
Matches	24	39	36
Runs scored	669	864	384
Batting average	21.58	37.56	38.40
100s/50s	1/2	0/5	0/1
Top score	110	84*	55*
Balls bowled	1,948	912	144
Wickets	22	22	6
Bowling average	41.22	30.81	37.00
5 wickets in innings	0	0	0
10 wickets in match	0	0	0
Best bowling	3/28	3/32	2/17
Catches/stumpings	6/-	12/-	13/-
- Source: Cricinfo, 18 March 2025

Sanvir Singh (born 12 October 1996) is an Indian domestic cricketer who plays for Punjab in domestic cricket and previously appeared for Sunrisers Hyderabad in the Indian Premier League. He made his List A debut for Punjab in the 2018–19 Vijay Hazare Trophy on 28 September 2018. He made his first-class debut for Punjab in the 2018–19 Ranji Trophy on 1 November 2018, scoring a century in the first innings. In November 2019, he was named in India's squad for the 2019 ACC Emerging Teams Asia Cup in Bangladesh. He made his Twenty20 debut on 4 November 2021, for Punjab in the 2021–22 Syed Mushtaq Ali Trophy. He was bought by Sunrisers Hyderabad for Rs.20 Lakh, in the 2023 Indian Premier League auction.

== Early life ==
Sanvir Singh was born on 12 October 1996 in Ludhiana in the state of Punjab to Sukhdev Singh, an Indian Railways employee and Sharanjit Kaur.

In age-group cricket, Sanvir Singh was called 'Neil Johnson' as he used to open the bowling and batting just like the former Zimbabwe all-rounder.
