= Gangam Anikethreddy =

Indian cricketer (born 2000)

Personal information
- Born: 28 October 2000 (age 26); Nizamabad, Telangana, India

Domestic team information
- Years: Team
- 2020: Hyderabad

Career statistics
Competition	FC
Matches	1
Runs scored	5
Batting average	2.50
100s/50s	0/0
Top score	4
Balls bowled	210
Wickets	4
Bowling average	21.00
5 wickets in innings	0
10 wickets in match	0
Best bowling	4/61
Catches/stumpings	2/–
- Source: ESPNcricinfo, 7 May 2020

Gangam Anikethreddy (born 28 October 2000) is an Indian cricketer. He made his first-class debut on 12 February 2020, for Hyderabad in the 2019–20 Ranji Trophy.
