= Aryan Juyal =

Indian cricketer (born 2001)

Personal information
- Born: 11 November 2001 (age 25); Moradabad, Uttar Pradesh, India
- Batting: Right-handed
- Role: Wicket-keeper

Domestic team information
- Years: Team
- 2018-present: Uttar Pradesh
- 2025: Lucknow Super Giants

Career statistics
| Competition | FC | LA | T20 |
|---|---|---|---|
| Matches | 27 | 39 | 23 |
| Runs scored | 1,769 | 1,511 | 505 |
| Batting average | 49.13 | 47.21 | 29.70 |
| 100s/50s | 7/6 | 4/9 | 0/4 |
| Top score | 201 | 159 | 75 |
| Catches/stumpings | 29/– | 29/2 | 9/2 |
- Source: ESPNcricinfo, 20 March 2025

Aryan Juyal (born 11 November 2001) is an Indian cricketer. He plays as right hand batter and Wicket-keeper. He represented Uttar Pradesh in domestic cricket.

He made his List A debut for Uttar Pradesh in the 2017–18 Vijay Hazare Trophy on 11 February 2018. Prior to his List A debut, he was named in India National Under-19 cricket team for the 2018 Under-19 Cricket World Cup. Juyal made his International debut against South Africa in the 2018 Under-19 Cricket World Cup in Christchurch, New Zealand.

== Career ==
Juyal made his debut in the Under-19 category for Uttar Pradesh. With 401 runs from five innings, he topped the batting charts for the Vinoo Mankad Trophy in 2017, and was in the top five of the Vinoo Mankad inter-zonal trophy. These performances earned him a slot in the Challenger Trophy, where he was the fourth highest run getter with 171 runs in four innings. In 2017 Juyal was selected for the 2018 Under-19 Cricket World Cup team, only the second uncapped player in the side. In this tournament, India won the finals against Australia on 3 February 2018, India's fourth U19 World Cup, the most by any team.

He made his Twenty20 debut for Uttar Pradesh in the 2018–19 Syed Mushtaq Ali Trophy on 2 March 2019. In November 2019, he was named in India's squad for the 2019 ACC Emerging Teams Asia Cup in Bangladesh. He made his first-class debut on 9 December 2019, for Uttar Pradesh in the 2019–20 Ranji Trophy.

In February 2022, he was bought by the Mumbai Indians in the auction for the 2022 Indian Premier League tournament. During the 2025 Indian Premier League mega auction in Jeddah, Juyal was bought by Lucknow Super Giants for INR 30 lakh.

== Honours ==
After his debut in the 2018 Under-19 Cricket World Cup team, Juyal along with his coach Negi was honoured by the Uttarakhand Chief Minister Trivendra Singh Rawat in Dehradun.
