= Harvik Desai =

Indian cricketer (born 1999)

Personal information
- Full name: Harvik Manishbhai Desai
- Born: 4 October 1999 (age 27); Bhavnagar, Gujarat, India
- Batting: Right-handed
- Role: Wicketkeeper-batsman

Domestic team information
- Years: Team
- 2018–present: Saurashtra

Career statistics
Competition	FC	LA	T20
Matches	14	9	13
Runs scored	979	139	210
Batting average	37.65	15.44	17.50
100s/50s	1/8	0/0	0/1
Top score	116	48	56
Catches/stumpings	25/0	8/1	12/2
- Source: ESPNcricinfo, 25 December 2019

Harvik Desai (born 4 October 1999) is an Indian cricketer. He made his List A debut for Saurashtra in the 2016–17 Vijay Hazare Trophy on 26 February 2017.

In December 2017, he was named in India's squad for the 2018 Under-19 Cricket World Cup, and scored the winning runs for India in the final of the tournament. He made his first-class debut for Saurashtra in the 2018–19 Ranji Trophy on 1 November 2018. In January 2019, in the quarter-final match of the 2018–19 Ranji Trophy against Uttar Pradesh, Desai scored his maiden century in first-class cricket. He made his Twenty20 debut for Saurashtra in the 2018–19 Syed Mushtaq Ali Trophy on 21 February 2019. He was in Mumbai Indians in IPL 2024 as replacement.
