= 2018–19 Ranji Trophy Group C =

Cricket tournament

2018-19 Ranji Trophy Group C
- The Ranji Trophy, awarded to the winners
- Dates: 1 November 2018 – 10 January 2019
- Administrator(s): BCCI
- Cricket format: First-class cricket
- Tournament format(s): Round-robin
- Host(s): India
- Participants: 10
- Matches: 36

The 2018–19 Ranji Trophy was the 85th season of the Ranji Trophy, the first-class cricket tournament that took place in India. It was contested by 37 teams, divided into four groups, with ten teams in Group C. The group stage ran from 1 November 2018 to 10 January 2019. The top two teams from Group C progressed to the quarter-finals of the competition.

On 2 January 2019, Rajasthan became the first team to qualify for the quarter-finals, after they beat Goa by ten wickets. Goa were relegated from Group C to the Plate Group for the next season. On the final day of the group stage, Uttar Pradesh qualified from Group C for the quarter-finals.

== Points table ==
Team	Pld	W	L	D	T	NR	Pts	Quot
Rajasthan	9	7	0	2	0	0	51	1.539
Uttar Pradesh	9	5	0	4	0	0	41	1.964
Jharkhand	9	5	1	3	0	0	40	1.266
Odisha	9	4	3	2	0	0	26	1.101
Haryana	9	3	4	2	0	0	22	0.844
Assam	9	3	4	2	0	0	21	0.847
Jammu & Kashmir	9	3	5	1	0	0	19	0.826
Services	9	2	3	4	0	0	19	0.936
Tripura	9	1	6	2	0	0	11	0.734
Goa	9	0	7	2	0	0	6	0.639

- Top two teams advanced to the knockout stage and are promoted to the Elite Groups A and B for the next season.
- Bottom ranked team is relegated to the Plate Group for the next season.

== Fixtures ==
=== Round 1 ===
1–4 November 2018
Scorecard

Tripura	v	Services
360 (122.3 overs); Bishal Ghosh 201 (269); Diwesh Pathania 4/79 (29.3 overs)		238 (85 overs); Anshul Gupta 62 (140); Manisankar Murasingh 7/53 (26 overs)
232/2d (61 overs); Udiyan Bose 109 (170); Vikas Yadav 1/47 (15 overs)		162/6 (51 overs); Ravi Chauhan 47 (65); Manisankar Murasingh 2/35 (13 overs)

Match drawn
Maharaja Bir Bikram College Stadium, Agartala
Umpires: Jayaraman Madanagopal and Chirra Ravikanthreddy
Player of the match: Bishal Ghosh (Tripura)

- Services won the toss and elected to field.
- Ninad Kadam (Tripura) made his first-class debut.

1–4 November 2018
Scorecard

Rajasthan	v	Jammu & Kashmir
379 (109.4 overs); Chetan Bist 159 (294); Mohammed Mudhasir 5/90 (29 overs)		204 (71.1 overs); Parvez Rasool 47 (50); Rahul Chahar 5/59 (20.1 overs)
219/4d (63 overs); Amitkumar Gautam 68 (166); Parvez Rasool 2/50 (14 overs)		319 (97.4 overs); Parvez Rasool 110* (151); Nathu Singh 4/83 (18.4 overs)

Rajasthan won by 75 runs
Sawai Mansingh Stadium, Jaipur
Umpires: Saiyed Khalid and Virender Sharma
Player of the match: Chetan Bist (Rajasthan)

- Jammu & Kashmir won the toss and elected to field.
- Fazil Rashid (Jammu & Kashmir) made his first-class debut.
- Mohammed Mudhasir (Jammu & Kashmir) took a hat-trick and four wickets in four balls.
- Robin Bist (Rajasthan) scored his 6,000th run in first-class cricket.

1–4 November 2018
Scorecard

Odisha	v	Haryana
324 (112.2 overs); Anurag Sarangi 114 (190); Tinu Kundu 4/44 (21.2 overs)		442 (128.3 overs); Himanshu Rana 164 (231); Debabrata Pradhan 3/96 (23 overs)
267/7 (99.2 overs); Biplab Samantray 103* (210); Jayant Yadav 2/45 (28 overs)

Match drawn
KIIT Stadium, Bhubaneswar
Umpires: Kamlesh Sharma and Yeshwant Barde
Player of the match: Himanshu Rana (Haryana)

- Odisha won the toss and elected to bat.
- Pappu Roy, Rajesh Mohanty, Debabrata Pradhan (Odisha) and Tinu Kundu (Haryana) all made their first-class debuts.
- Biplab Samantray (Odisha) scored his 3,000th run in first-class cricket.

1–4 November 2018
Scorecard

Jharkhand	v	Assam
344 (112.1 overs); Anukul Roy 80 (141); Mukhtar Hussain 5/77 (29.1 overs)		298 (105.2 overs); Gokul Sharma 92 (187); Ashish Kumar 5/69 (23.5 overs)
230/4d (42.5 overs); Ishan Kishan 120 (104); Rahul Singh 1/25 (8 overs)		139/2 (39 overs); Sibsankar Roy 52* (88); Anukul Roy 2/55 (15 overs)

Match drawn
JSCA International Stadium Complex, Ranchi
Umpires: Nikhil Patwardhan and Subrat Das
Player of the match: Ashish Kumar (Jharkhand)

- Assam won the toss and elected to field.
- Anukul Roy (Jharkhand) and Mukhtar Hussain (Assam) both made their first-class debuts.
- Ranjeet Mali (Assam) took his 100th wicket in the Ranji Trophy.

1–4 November 2018
Scorecard

Goa	v	Uttar Pradesh
152 (35.4 overs); Darshan Misal 43 (66); Shivam Mavi 4/25 (10 overs)		564/4d (161 overs); Akshdeep Nath 194 (304); Lakshay Garg 2/109 (36 overs)
165 (77.1 overs); Darshan Misal 51* (92); Ankit Rajpoot 5/41 (22.1 overs)

Uttar Pradesh won by an innings and 247 runs
Green Park, Kanpur
Umpires: Sanjeev Dua and Tapan Sharma
Player of the match: Akshdeep Nath (Uttar Pradesh)

- Uttar Pradesh won the toss and elected to field.
- Madhav Kaushik, Priyam Garg, Shivam Mavi and Yash Dayal (Uttar Pradesh) all made their first-class debuts.

=== Round 2 ===
12–15 November 2018
Scorecard

Services	v	Rajasthan
228 (64.5 overs); Anshul Gupta 54 (119); Tanveer Ul-Haq 4/61 (20 overs)		136 (56.1 overs); Chetan Bist 46 (87); Sachidanand Pandey 5/58 (20.1 overs)
264 (81.4 overs); Rahul Singh 107 (152); Rahul Chahar 3/45 (15 overs)		357/5 (125.3 overs); Rajasthan 159 (344); Nitin Tanwar 3/82 (29 overs)

Rajasthan won by 5 wickets
Sawai Mansingh Stadium, Jaipur
Umpires: Saiyed Khalid and Nikhil Patwardhan
Player of the match: Amitkumar Gautam (Rajasthan)

- Services won the toss and elected to bat.
- Akash Sharma (Services) made his first-class debut.
- This was the third-highest successful run-chase in the history of the Ranji Trophy.

12–15 November 2018
Scorecard

Goa	v	Jammu & Kashmir
468/9d (188.5 overs); Snehal Kauthankar 130* (216); Irfan Pathan 3/69 (27.4 overs)		271 (86.5 overs); Irfan Pathan 60 (90); Lakshay Garg 4/87 (22.5 overs)
		242/5 (73 overs) (f/o); Ian Dev Singh 113* (195); Lakshay Garg 2/31 (8 overs)

Match drawn
Goa Cricket Association Academy Ground, Porvorim
Umpires: Ulhas Gandhe and Vineet Kulkarni
Player of the match: Snehal Kauthankar (Goa)

- Jammu & Kashmir won the toss and elected to field.

12–15 November 2018
Scorecard

Haryana	v	Jharkhand
81 (41.3 overs); Shubham Rohilla 36 (97); Ajay Yadav 4/24 (13.3 overs)		143 (44.2 overs); Anukul Roy 27 (34); Ashish Hooda 5/37 (16 overs)
72 (28 overs); Poonish Mehta 15 (36); Varun Aaron 6/32 (10 overs)		12/1 (4 overs); Nazim Siddiqui 10* (11); Harshal Patel 1/6 (2 overs)

Jharkhand won by 9 wickets
CH Bansi Lal Cricket Stadium, Rohtak
Umpires: Sanjay Kumar Singh and Virender Sharma
Player of the match: Ajay Yadav (Jharkhand)

- Haryana won the toss and elected to bat.

12–15 November 2018
Scorecard

Odisha	v	Uttar Pradesh
256 (68.1 overs); Subhranshu Senapati 87 (136); Ankit Rajpoot 3/61 (16 overs)		437 (130.4 overs); Akshdeep Nath 159 (282); Basant Mohanty 6/62 (30.4 overs)
221 (72.3 overs); Sandeep Pattnaik 46 (80); Shivam Mavi 5/68 (18 overs)		44/0 (12.5 overs); Madhav Kaushik 22* (44)

Uttar Pradesh won by 10 wickets
KIIT Stadium, Bhubaneswar
Umpires: Akshay Totre and Belur Ravi
Player of the match: Akshdeep Nath (Uttar Pradesh)

- Uttar Pradesh won the toss and elected to field.

12–15 November 2018
Scorecard

Assam	v	Tripura
327 (104.4 overs); Parvez Aziz 88 (167); Abhijit Sarkar 5/107 (26.4 overs)		139 (53.3 overs); Pratyush Singh 47 (78); Arup Das 5/42 (19 overs)
239/6d (57 overs); Riyan Parag 80 (64); Harmeet Singh 2/57 (15 overs)		216 (74 overs); Harmeet Singh 33 (77); Mukhtar Hussain 5/73 (23 overs)

Assam won by 211 runs
Maharaja Bir Bikram College Stadium, Agartala
Umpires: Chirra Ravikanthreddy and Nand Kishore
Player of the match: Mukhtar Hussain (Assam)

- Tripura won the toss and elected to field.
- Subham Ghosh (Tripura) made his first-class debut.

=== Round 3 ===
20–23 November 2018
Scorecard

Rajasthan	v	Jharkhand
100 (42.2 overs); Rajesh Bishnoi 33 (43); Varun Aaron 5/22 (12 overs)		152 (58.1 overs); Ishank Jaggi 79 (131); Tanveer Ul-Haq 6/42 (20.1 overs)
379 (127.4 overs); Ashok Menaria 125 (325); Anukul Roy 4/97 (30.4 overs)		235 (81 overs); Ishank Jaggi 51 (126); Rahul Chahar 5/77 (25 overs)

Rajasthan won by 92 runs
JSCA International Stadium Complex, Ranchi
Umpires: Abhijit Bengeri and Pashchim Pathak
Player of the match: Ashok Menaria (Rajasthan)

- Jharkhand won the toss and elected to field.
- Alok Sharma (Jharkhand) made his first-class debut.

20–23 November 2018
Scorecard

Assam	v	Odisha
121 (51.1 overs); Ranjit Mali 28 (46); Rajesh Mohanty 5/31 (18 overs)		240 (85.2 overs); Anurag Sarangi 77 (124); Ranjit Mali 6/80 (30 overs)
132 (50 overs); Sibsankar Roy 56 (124); Rajesh Mohanty 6/55 (21 overs)		16/1 (3.3 overs); Govinda Poddar 9* (7); Mukhtar Hussain 1/2 (1 over)

Odisha won by 9 wickets
Barsapara Cricket Stadium, Guwahati
Umpires: Jayaraman Madanagopal and Chettithody Shamshuddin
Player of the match: Rajesh Mohanty (Odisha)

- Odisha won the toss and elected to field.
- Romario Sharma (Assam) made his first-class debut.
- Rajesh Mohanty (Odisha) took his maiden ten-wicket match haul in first-class cricket.

20–23 November 2018
Scorecard

Services	v	Uttar Pradesh
260 (92.2 overs); Devender Lochab 75 (134); Shivam Mavi 4/44 (21 overs)		535/9d (159.2 overs); Rinku Singh 163* (230); Diwesh Pathania 4/104 (34 overs)
225/2 (88 overs); Ravi Chauhan 114* (260); Ankit Rajpoot 1/48 (17 overs)

Match drawn
Palam A Ground, Model Sports Complex, Delhi
Umpires: Sanjeev Dua and Rajeev Godara
Player of the match: Rinku Singh (Uttar Pradesh)

- Services won the toss and elected to bat.

20–23 November 2018
Scorecard

Tripura	v	Jammu & Kashmir
124 (42 overs); Ninad Kadam 34 (92); Parvez Rasool 5/30 (10 overs)		442 (121 overs); Ahmed Bandy 136 (228); Harmeet Singh 5/91 (38 overs)
358 (123.1 overs); Smit Patel 112 (257); Waseem Raza 6/78 (30.1 overs)		43/2 (9.3 overs); Paras Sharma 23 (28); Subham Ghosh 1/7 (2 overs)

Jammu & Kashmir won by 8 wickets
Sher-i-Kashmir Stadium, Srinagar
Umpires: Kamlesh Sharma and Navdeep Singh

- Tripura won the toss and elected to bat.
- This was the first cricket match to be played in Jammu and Kashmir since December 2015.

20–23 November 2018
Scorecard

Haryana	v	Goa
276 (88 overs); Himanshu Rana 86 (174); Krishna Das 6/75 (30 overs)		177 (79.1 overs); Sagun Kamat 68 (186); Poonish Mehta 4/21 (14.1 overs)
185 (70 overs); Pramod Chandila 122* (182); Krishna Das 5/41 (22 overs)		141 (49.3 overs); Suyash Prabhudessai 36 (74); Ashish Hooda 6/54 (18.3 overs)

Haryana won by 143 runs
CH Bansi Lal Cricket Stadium, Rohtak
Umpires: Tapan Sharma and Anil Chaudhary
Player of the match: Pramod Chandila (Haryana)

- Goa won the toss and elected to field.
- Prashant Vashist (Haryana) and Suyash Prabhudessai (Goa) both made their first-class debuts.

=== Round 4 ===
28 November–1 December 2018
Scorecard

Tripura	v	Odisha
122 (43 overs); Pratyush Singh 43 (57); Suryakant Pradhan 7/40 (13 overs)		211 (59.2 overs); Biplab Samantray 88 (142); Abhijit Sarkar 3/33 (11 overs)
304 (91.3 overs); Manisankar Murasingh 75 (104); Basant Mohanty 4/53 (25.3 overs)		217/5 (63.2 overs); Subhranshu Senapati 84* (169); Manisankar Murasingh 4/54 (19 overs)

Odisha won by 5 wickets
DRIEMS Ground, Cuttack
Umpires: Anil Dandekar and Nikhil Patwardhan
Player of the match: Subhranshu Senapati (Odisha)

- Odisha won the toss and elected to field.

28 November–1 December 2018
Scorecard

Jammu & Kashmir	v	Services
95 (31.5 overs); Shubham Khajuria 44 (56); Arun Bamal 5/13 (7.5 overs)		252 (91.4 overs); Anshul Gupta 59 (150); Parvez Rasool 8/85 (33.4 overs)
261 (98.5 overs); Parvez Rasool 115 (217); Arun Bamal 4/93 (32.5 overs)		107/5 (36.5 overs); Rajat Paliwal 43* (74); Parvez Rasool 2/18 (13 overs)

Services won by 5 wickets
Palam A Ground, Delhi
Umpires: Anil Chaudhary and Nand Kishore
Player of the match: Parvez Rasool (Services)

- Jammu & Kashmir won the toss and elected to bat.

28 November–1 December 2018
Scorecard

Assam	v	Haryana
310 (117.3 overs); Gokul Sharma 96 (229); Jayant Yadav 3/51 (21 overs)		97 (27.2 overs); Jayant Yadav 30 (25); Arup Das 5/52 (12 overs)
		178 (52 overs) (f/o); Poonish Mehta 70* (94); Arup Das 4/37 (16 overs)

Assam won by an innings and 35 runs
Barsapara Cricket Stadium, Guwahati
Umpires: K. N. Ananthapadmanabhan and Navdeep Singh
Player of the match: Arup Das (Assam)

- Haryana won the toss and elected to field.

28 November–1 December 2018
Scorecard

Goa	v	Jharkhand
364 (140.2 overs); Amit Verma 154 (226); Ashish Kumar 3/71 (28 overs)		390 (124.5 overs); Anukul Roy 127 (212); Amulya Pandrekar 3/78 (26 overs)
131 (48.3 overs); Suyash Prabhudessai 39 (60); Rahul Prasad 6/45 (16.3 overs)		108/3 (32.2 overs); Kumar Deobrat 48* (90); Vijesh Prabhudessai 2/22 (9 overs)

Jharkhand won by 7 wickets
Goa Cricket Association Academy Ground, Porvorim
Umpires: Krishnaraj Srinath and Tapan Sharma
Player of the match: Anukul Roy (Jharkhand)

- Goa won the toss and elected to bat.
- Vijesh Prabhudessai, Vishamber Kahlon (Goa) and Rahul Prasad (Jharkhand) all made their first-class debuts.

28 November–1 December 2018
Scorecard

Rajasthan	v	Uttar Pradesh
311 (112.4 overs); Robin Bist 96 (195); Ankit Rajpoot 5/61 (25 overs)		214 (61.5 overs); Upendra Yadav 67 (127); Aniket Choudhary 5/64 (20.5 overs)
232 (98.2 overs); Amitkumar Gautam 86 (202); Saurabh Kumar 6/77 (34.2 overs)		116/2 (36 overs); Mohammad Saif 58 (113); Tajinder Singh 1/16 (6 overs)

Match drawn
Green Park Stadium, Kanpur
Umpires: Belur Ravi and Pashchim Pathak
Player of the match: Aniket Choudhary (Rajasthan)

- Uttar Pradesh won the toss and elected to field.

=== Round 5 ===
6–9 December 2018
Scorecard

Services	v	Goa
184 (71.3 overs); Ravi Chauhan 75 (144); Vijesh Prabhudessai 5/52 (24 overs)		259 (100.2 overs); Darshan Misal 101 (196); Diwesh Pathania 5/74 (31.2 overs)
332 (103.4 overs); Rahul Singh 111 (202); Amit Verma 5/39 (11.4 overs)		67/2 (54 overs); Amit Verma 23* (121); Akash Sharma 2/20 (10 overs)

Match drawn
Goa Cricket Association Academy Ground, Porvorim
Umpires: Kamlesh Sharma and Nand Kishore
Player of the match: Darshan Misal (Goa)

- Goa won the toss and elected to field.
- Mohammad Asaduddin (Goa) made his first-class debut.

6–9 December 2018
Scorecard

Jammu & Kashmir	v	Uttar Pradesh
290 (71.4 overs); Irfan Pathan 91 (76); Saurabh Kumar 6/90 (18.4 overs)		188 (57.2 overs); Rinku Singh 66 (88); Parvez Rasool 4/47 (13.2 overs)
111 (48 overs); Ahmed Bandy 19 (28); Saurabh Kumar 5/28 (18 overs)		218/4 (59.2 overs); Suresh Raina 66* (100); Parvez Rasool 2/63 (18 overs)

Uttar Pradesh won by 6 wickets
Gandhi Memorial Science College Ground, Jammu
Umpires: Vineet Kulkarni and C. K. Nandan
Player of the match: Saurabh Kumar (Uttar Pradesh)

- Uttar Pradesh won the toss and elected to field.
- Aakash Choudhary (Jammu & Kashmir) made his first-class debut.

6–9 December 2018
Scorecard

Haryana	v	Tripura
292 (100.4 overs); Rahul Dagar 114 (210); Ajoy Sarkar 5/57 (27 overs)		250 (76.1 overs); Pratyush Singh 76 (110); Harshal Patel 4/49 (16 overs)
119 (44.2 overs); Himanshu Rana 64 (104); Ajoy Sarkar 3/15 (7.2 overs)		103 (32.3 overs); Pratyush Singh 23 (48); Amit Rana 4/37 (11 overs)

Haryana won by 55 runs
Maharaja Bir Bikram College Stadium, Agartala
Umpires: Tapan Sharma and Navdeep Singh
Player of the match: Rahul Dagar (Haryana)

- Haryana won the toss and elected to bat.

6–9 December 2018
Scorecard

Jharkhand	v	Odisha
172 (71.1 overs); Kumar Deobrat 29 (75); Basant Mohanty 5/44 (18.1 overs)		201 (55.4 overs); Anurag Sarangi 58 (155); Anukul Roy 2/35 (6 overs)
288 (94 overs); Saurabh Tiwary 132* (220); Rajesh Mohanty 4/87 (25 overs)		257 (101.3 overs); Subhranshu Senapati 157* (321); Anukul Roy 4/51 (23 overs)

Jharkhand won by 2 runs
JSCA International Stadium Complex, Ranchi
Umpires: Chettithody Shamshuddin and Krishnaraj Srinath
Player of the match: Subhranshu Senapati (Odisha)

- Odisha won the toss and elected to field.
- This was the narrowest margin of victory, by runs, in this edition of the Ranji Trophy.

6–9 December 2018
Scorecard

Assam	v	Rajasthan
108 (28.1 overs); Arup Das 36* (20); Aniket Choudhary 5/38 (11 overs)		325 (111.2 overs); Mahipal Lomror 133 (222); Ranjit Mali 5/62 (35 overs)
174 (59.4 overs); Gokul Sharma 77 (117); Aniket Choudhary 5/40 (17.4 overs)

Rajasthan won by an innings and 43 runs
Sawai Mansingh Stadium, Jaipur
Umpires: K. N. Ananthapadmanabhan and Sadashiv Iyer
Player of the match: Aniket Choudhary (Rajasthan)

- Rajasthan won the toss and elected to field.
- Jitumoni Kalita (Assam) made his first-class debut.

=== Round 6 ===
14–17 December 2018
Scorecard

Jharkhand	v	Uttar Pradesh
354 (116.1 overs); Shahbaz Nadeem 109 (215); Dhruv Pratap Singh 6/105 (26 overs)		243 (66 overs); Priyam Garg 54 (93); Rahul Shukla 5/65 (18 overs)
213/5d (63.3 overs); Kumar Deobrat 78 (186); Yash Dayal 3/49 (19 overs)		174/1 (56 overs); Priyam Garg 80* (135); Varun Aaron 1/5 (7 overs)

Match drawn
Ekana International Cricket Stadium, Lucknow
Umpires: Pranav Joshi and Navdeep Singh
Player of the match: Rahul Shukla (Jharkhand)

- Uttar Pradesh won the toss and elected to field.

14–17 December 2018
Scorecard

Rajasthan	v	Odisha
135 (37 overs); Mahipal Lomror 85 (105); Basant Mohanty 6/20 (15 overs)		111 (57.2 overs); Debasish Samantray 50 (161); Tanveer Ul-Haq 5/14 (23 overs)
148 (50.2 overs); Amitkumar Gautam 51 (119); Basant Mohanty 5/29 (19 overs)		137 (45.2 overs); Suryakant Pradhan 56 (33); Aniket Choudhary 5/25 (20.2 overs)

Rajasthan won by 35 runs
KIIT Stadium, Bhubaneswar
Umpires: Vineet Kulkarni and Dharmesh Bhardwaj
Player of the match: Basant Mohanty (Rajasthan)

- Odisha won the toss and elected to field.
- Roshan Kumar Rao and Debasish Samantray (Odisha) both made their first-class debuts.

14–17 December 2018
Scorecard

Tripura	v	Goa
358 (115.4 overs); Pratyush Singh 110 (180); Amit Verma 3/87 (32)		192 (89.4 overs); Snehal Kauthankar 79 (209); Abhijit Sarkar 4/29 (11.4 overs)
9/0 (0.5 overs); Joydeep Banik 4* (1)		173 (62.2 overs) (f/o); Suyash Prabhudessai 65 (107); Harmeet Singh 3/46 (18 overs)

Tripura won by 10 wickets
Maharaja Bir Bikram College Stadium, Agartala
Umpires: Pashchim Pathak and Krishnamachari Srinivasan

- Tripura won the toss and elected to bat.
- Joydeep Banik (Tripura) and Rajashekhar Harikant (Goa) both made their first-class debuts.
- Pratyush Singh (Tripura) scored his maiden century in first-class debut.
- This was the first time that Tripura had won a match by 10 wickets and the first time they had earned a bonus point in the Ranji Trophy.

14–17 December 2018
Scorecard

Assam	v	Services
211 (98.5 overs); Amit Sinha 56 (113); Sachidanand Pandey 5/74 (27 overs)		396 (136.4 overs); Rajat Paliwal 180* (373); Jitumoni Kalita 3/99 (28 overs)
256 (86 overs); Swarupam Purkayastha 74 (144); Diwesh Pathania 5/56 (20 overs)		75/0 (18.1 overs); Rajat Paliwal 39* (48)

Services won by 10 wickets
Palam A Ground, Delhi
Umpires: Nitin Pandit and Belur Ravi
Player of the match: Rajat Paliwal (Services)

- Services won the toss and elected to field.

14–17 December 2018
Scorecard

Jammu & Kashmir	v	Haryana
161 (47.1 overs); Obaid Haroon 26 (49); Ajit Chahal 3/31 (9 overs)		145 (48.3 overs); Rohit Sharma 41 (75); Umar Nazir 5/55 (16 overs)
205 (54.2 overs); Owais Shah 71 (76); Yuzvendra Chahal 4/37 (13 overs)		91 (33.3 overs); Ankit Kumar 17 (12); Irfan Pathan 5/18 (13 overs)

Jammu & Kashmir won by 130 runs
CH Bansi Lal Cricket Stadium, Rohtak
Umpires: Amiesh Saheba and C. K. Nandan
Player of the match: Umar Nazir (Jammu & Kashmir)

- Haryana won the toss and elected to field.
- Ankit Kumar and Ravi Balhara (Haryana) both made their first-class debuts.

=== Round 7 ===
22–25 December 2018
Scorecard

Assam	v	Goa
175 (50.2 overs); Biplab Saikia 41 (54); Lakshay Garg 5/73 (18.2 overs)		193 (65.5 overs); Snehal Kauthankar 69 (116); Mukhtar Hussain 3/67 (21 overs)
235 (84.3 overs); Rishav Das 67 (146); Krishna Das 4/69 (27 overs)		210 (63.2 overs); Amit Verma 74 (113); Arup Das 6/67 (24.2 overs)

Assam won by 7 runs
Barsapara Cricket Stadium, Guwahati
Umpires: Krishnaraj Srinath and Abhijit Deshmukh
Player of the match: Arup Das (Assam)

- Goa won the toss and elected to field.
- Biplab Saikia (Assam) made his first-class debut.
- Lakshay Garg (Goa) took his maiden five-wicket haul in first-class cricket.

22–25 December 2018
Scorecard

Uttar Pradesh	v	Tripura
552/7d (149 overs); Priyam Garg 206 (371); Saurabh Das 4/164 (37.4 overs)		108 (44 overs); Smit Patel 47 (96); Zeeshan Ansari 3/33 (8 overs)
		60 (25 overs) (f/o); Rana Dutta 22* (29); Ankit Rajpoot 6/25 (13 overs)

Uttar Pradesh won by an innings and 384 runs
Ekana International Cricket Stadium, Lucknow
Umpires: Puttarangaiah Jayapal and Nand Kishore
Player of the match: Priyam Garg (Uttar Pradesh)

- Uttar Pradesh won the toss and elected to bat.
- Priyam Garg (Uttar Pradesh) scored his maiden double century in first-class cricket.
- This was the largest winning margin by runs in this edition of the Ranji Trophy.

22–25 December 2018
Scorecard

Jharkhand	v	Services
193 (66 overs); Ishan Kishan 68 (67); Arun Bamal 4/37 (11 overs)		267 (93.3 overs); Rajat Paliwal 79 (126); Anukul Roy 4/66 (16 overs)
343 (97.2 overs); Utkarsh Singh 114 (234); Rajat Paliwal 3/29 (7 overs)		188 (57.4 overs); Rahul Singh 61 (115); Shahbaz Nadeem 7/62 (22.4 overs)

Jharkhand won by 81 runs
JSCA International Stadium Complex, Ranchi
Umpires: Sivasubramaniyan Shankar and Pashchim Pathak
Player of the match: Utkarsh Singh (Jharkhand)

- Services won the toss and elected to field.
- Roshan Raj (Services) made his first-class debut.
- Utkarsh Singh (Services) scored his maiden century in first-class cricket.

22–25 December 2018
Scorecard

Jammu & Kashmir	v	Odisha
127 (53.3 overs); Owais Shah 44 (97); Suryakant Pradhan 4/27 (15 overs)		323 (106.3 overs); Abhishek Raut 116* (212); Irfan Pathan 4/52 (21 overs)
391 (134.4 overs); Parvez Rasool 158 (217); Basant Mohanty 4/59 (37 overs)		197/2 (49.1 overs); Shantanu Mishra 78 (147); Mohammed Mudhasir 1/35 (7 overs)

Odisha won by 8 wickets
Gandhi Memorial Science College Ground, Jammu
Umpires: Tapan Sharma and Navdeep Singh
Player of the match: Abhishek Raut (Odisha)

- Jammu & Kashmir won the toss and elected to bat.
- Qamran Iqbal (Jammu & Kashmir) made his first-class debut.

22–25 December 2018
Scorecard

Haryana	v	Rajasthan
118 (36.2 overs); Harshal Patel 53* (55); Aniket Choudhary 5/45 (15 overs)		490/6d (158 overs); Robin Bist 150* (323); Yuzvendra Chahal 3/107 (33 overs)
462/8 (146 overs); Chaitanya Bishnoi 94 (208); Rahul Chahar 5/151 (49 overs)

Match drawn
Sawai Mansingh Stadium, Jaipur
Umpires: Jayaraman Madanagopal and Chirra Ravikanthreddy
Player of the match: Robin Bist (Rajasthan)

- Rajasthan won the toss and elected to field.

=== Round 8 ===
30 December 2018 – 2 January 2019
Scorecard

Odisha	v	Services
177 (86.2 overs); Abhishek Raut 56 (102); Arun Bamal 4/61 (31 overs)		417/8d (141 overs); Vikas Hathwala 115* (196); Govinda Poddar 2/85 (29 overs)
256/5 (110 overs); Debasish Samantray 102 (259); Arun Bamal 2/58 (34 overs)

Match drawn
Palam A Ground, Delhi
Umpires: Sivasubramaniyan Shankar and Navdeep Singh
Player of the match: Vikas Hathwala (Services)

- Odisha won the toss and elected to bat.

30 December 2018 – 2 January 2019
Scorecard

Assam	v	Jammu & Kashmir
128 (36.1 overs); Mrinmoy Dutta 35* (54); Umar Nazir 3/31 (9.1 overs)		144 (43.4 overs); Qamran Iqbal 64 (113); Mukhtar Hussain 5/39 (17 overs)
245 (76.2 overs); Rishav Das 95 (200); Parvez Rasool 3/30 (11.2 overs)		231/6 (69.3 overs); Parvez Rasool 67 (87); Arup Das 3/46 (17 overs)

Jammu & Kashmir won by 4 wickets
Barsapara Cricket Stadium, Guwahati
Umpires: Ulhas Gandhe and Krishnaraj Srinath
Player of the match: Parvez Rasool (Jammu & Kashmir)

- Jammu & Kashmir won the toss and elected to field.
- Kanhaiya Wadhawan, Rasikh Salam and Musaif Ajaz (Jammu & Kashmir) all made their first-class debuts.

30 December 2018 – 2 January 2019
Scorecard

Haryana	v	Uttar Pradesh
110 (43 overs); Himanshu Rana 50 (108); Saurabh Kumar 7/33 (19 overs)		133 (37.2 overs); Rinku Singh 43 (64); Ajit Chahal 5/16 (7 overs)
129 (37.2 overs); Ankit Kumar 51 (65); Saurabh Kumar 7/32 (16 overs)		110/4 (21.2 overs); Samarth Singh 53* (64); Sanjay Pahal 1/10 (3 overs)

Uttar Pradesh won by 6 wickets
CH Bansi Lal Cricket Stadium, Rohtak
Umpires: Tapan Sharma and Madanagopal Kuppuraj
Player of the match: Saurabh Kumar (Uttar Pradesh)

- Uttar Pradesh won the toss and elected to field.
- Saurabh Kumar took the second-best match figures for a bowler for Uttar Pradesh in the Ranji Trophy with 14 for 65.

30 December 2018 – 2 January 2019
Scorecard

Tripura	v	Jharkhand
253 (89.4 overs); Rajib Saha 48* (112); Rahul Shukla 4/38 (20.4 overs)		409 (111.4 overs); Kumar Deobrat 150 (282); Neelambuj Vats 5/50 (18 overs)
308 (108.3 overs); Udiyan Bose 91 (203); Utkarsh Singh 3/65 (20 overs)		144/7 (21.5 overs); Kumar Deobrat 38 (31); Saurabh Das 2/64 (9.5 overs)

Match drawn
Keenan Stadium, Jamshedpur
Umpires: Amit Bansal and Rajesh Timaney
Player of the match: Kumar Deobrat (Jharkhand)

- Jharkhand won the toss and elected to field.
- Nirupam Sen and Neelambuj Vats (Tripura) both made their first-class debuts.
- Neelambuj Vats (Tripura) took his maiden five-wicket haul in first-class cricket.

30 December 2018 – 2 January 2019
Scorecard

Goa	v	Rajasthan
244 (80 overs); Snehal Kauthankar 48 (95); Rahul Chahar 4/86 (23 overs)		513/8d (138 overs); Robin Bist 169* (265); Lakshay Garg 3/127 (30 overs)
295 (69.1 overs); Amit Verma 118 (173); Rahul Chahar 5/81 (18.1 overs)		27/0 (5 overs); Chetan Bist 15* (15)

Rajasthan won by 10 wickets
Goa Cricket Association Academy Ground, Porvorim
Umpires: GS Ananth Ramakrishnan and Nand Kishore
Player of the match: Rahul Chahar (Rajasthan)

- Goa won the toss and elected to bat.

=== Round 9 ===
7–10 January 2019
Scorecard

Jammu & Kashmir	v	Jharkhand
151 (45.4 overs); Owais Shah 76 (94); Ajay Yadav 5/16 (11.4 overs)		319/9d (91 overs); Saurabh Tiwary 134 (260); Parvez Rasool 4/98 (33 overs)
120 (49.4 overs); Rasikh Salam 40 (25); Shahbaz Nadeem 4/43 (18 overs)

Jharkhand won by an innings and 48 runs
Gandhi Memorial Science College Ground, Jammu
Umpires: Krishnaraj Srinath and Abhijit Deshmukh
Player of the match: Saurabh Tiwary (Jharkhand)

- Jammu & Kashmir won the toss and elected to bat.
- No play was possible on day 1 due to rain.
- Suryansh Raina and Govind Sharma (Jammu & Kashmir) both made their first-class debuts.

7–10 January 2019
Scorecard

Tripura	v	Rajasthan
35 (18.5 overs); Neelambuj Vats 11* (25); Aniket Choudhary 5/11 (7 overs)		218 (51.3 overs); Tanveer Ul-Haq 37 (35); Manisankar Murasingh 4/75 (19 overs)
106 (25.3 overs); Harmeet Singh 29 (34); Deepak Chahar 5/17 (8 overs)

Rajasthan won by an innings and 77 runs
Maharaja Bir Bikram College Stadium, Agartala
Umpires: Navdeep Singh and Nand Kishore
Player of the match: Aniket Choudhary (Rajasthan)

- Tripura won the toss and elected to bat.
- Tripura's first innings total of 35 was their lowest in first-class cricket.

7–10 January 2019
Scorecard

Odisha	v	Goa
352 (111.5 overs); Sandeep Pattnaik 100 (194); Amogh Sunil Desai 3/77 (24 overs)		116 (39 overs); Sagun Kamat 43 (61); Suryakant Pradhan 5/48 (10 overs)
151 (43.4 overs); Sujit Lenka 39 (30); Lakshay Garg 5/75 (20 overs)		111 (29.5 overs); Amogh Sunil Desai 28 (40); Rajesh Mohanty 5/49 (9.5 overs)

Odisha won by 276 runs
Vikas Cricket Ground, Cuttack
Umpires: Nikhil Patwardhan and Tapan Sharma
Player of the match: Suryakant Pradhan (Odisha)

- Goa won the toss and elected to field.

7–10 January 2019
Scorecard

Assam	v	Uttar Pradesh
175 (53.4 overs); Pallavkumar Das 75 (105); Yash Dayal 3/15 (10 overs)		619 (177.4 overs); Rinku Singh 149 (214); Ranjit Mali 4/127 (45.4 overs)
317/4 (103 overs); Gokul Sharma 100* (208); Imtiyaz Ahmed 2/73 (22 overs)

Match drawn
Green Park, Kanpur
Umpires: Belur Ravi and Rajeev Godara
Player of the match: Rinku Singh (Uttar Pradesh)

- Uttar Pradesh won the toss and elected to field.

7–10 January 2019
Scorecard

Services	v	Haryana
170 (59.3 overs); Vikas Hathwala 54 (110); Tinu Kundu 6/60 (18.3 overs)		149 (57.5 overs); Shubham Rohilla 64 (145); Arun Bamal 7/42 (23.5 overs)
79 (29.3 overs); Diwesh Pathania 25 (36); Tinu Kundu 5/35 (14.3 overs)		104/4 (24 overs); Ankit Kumar 72* (76); Navneet Singh 3/22 (5 overs)

Haryana won by 6 wickets
CH Bansi Lal Cricket Stadium, Rohtak
Umpires: Rohan Pandit and Krishnamachari Srinivasan
Player of the match: Ankit Kumar (Haryana)

- Haryana won the toss and elected to field.
- Tinu Kundu (Haryana) took his maiden five-wicket haul in first-class cricket.
