= 2023 Deodhar Trophy =

List A cricket tournament in India

- Dates: 24 July – 3 August 2023
- Administrator: Board of Control for Cricket in India
- Cricket format: List A
- Host: India
- Champions: South Zone (9th title)
- Participants: 6
- Matches: 16
- Player of the series: Riyan Parag (East Zone)
- Most runs: Riyan Parag (354) (East Zone)
- Most wickets: Vidwath Kaverappa (13) (South Zone)

The 2023 Deodhar Trophy was the 48th edition of the Deodhar Trophy, a domestic List A cricket competition that was played in India. It took place from 24 July to 3 August 2023. The tournament was played across six zones, forming part of the 2023 Indian domestic cricket season, announced by the Board of Control for Cricket in India (BCCI) in April 2023. Deodhar Trophy was last held in 2019, and this was also the first time it was played in zonal format since 2014.

In the final, South Zone defeated East Zone by 45 runs to win their ninth title.

== Teams ==
The following teams took part in the tournament:

- Central Zone
- East Zone
- North Zone
- North East Zone
- South Zone
- West Zone

== Squads ==
Central Zone	East Zone	North Zone	North East Zone	South Zone	West Zone
Venkatesh Iyer (c); Aryan Juyal (wk); Madhav Kaushik; Rinku Singh; Upendra Yadav; Aniket Choudhary; Akash Madhwal; Saransh Jain; Karn Sharma; Shivam Mavi; Yash Thakur; Shivam Chaudhary; Yash Dubey; Yash Kothari; Aditya Sarwate; Pratham Singh; ~~Mohsin Khan~~	Saurabh Tiwary (c); Abhishek Porel (wk); Abhimanyu Easwaran; Riyan Parag; Subhranshu Senapati; Virat Singh; Akash Deep; Manisankar Murasingh; Shahbaz Ahmed; Utkarsh Singh; Avinov Choudhury; Rishav Das; Sudip Kumar Gharami; Kumar Kushagra (wk); Mukhtar Hussain; Abhijeet Saket	Nitish Rana (c); Himanshu Rana; Prabhsimran Singh (wk); Mandeep Singh; Abhishek Sharma; Rishi Dhawan; Nishant Sindhu; Vivrant Sharma; Vaibhav Arora; Harshit Rana; Sandeep Sharma; Yudhvir Singh; Shubham Khajuria; Mayank Markande; Shubham Rohilla; Mayank Dagar; Shubham Arora	Langlonyamba Keishangbam (c); Imliwati Lemtur; Abhishek Kumar; Anup Ahlawat; Jehu Anderson; Khrievitso Kense; Nilesh Lamichaney; Lee Yong Lepcha; Nabam Abo; Larry Sangma; Rex Rajkumar; Palzor Tamang; Priyojit Singh Kangabam; Ashish Thapa; Kamsha Yangfo; ~~Pheiroijam Jotin~~	Mayank Agarwal (c); Arun Karthik (wk); Devdutt Padikkal; Ricky Bhui; Narayan Jagadeesan; Washington Sundar; Vidwath Kaverappa; Vasuki Koushik; R. Sai Kishore; Arjun Tendulkar; Vijaykumar Vyshak; Sijomon Joseph; Rohan Kunnummal; Mohit Redkar; Rohit Rayudu; Sai Sudharsan	Priyank Panchal (c); Ankit Bawne; Rahul Tripathi; Kathan Patel; Harvik Desai (wk); Sarfaraz Khan; Het Patel (wk); Shivam Dube; Rajvardhan Hangargekar; Shams Mulani; Atit Sheth; Parth Bhut; Samarth Vyas; Chintan Gaja; Arzan Nagwaswalla; ~~Prithvi Shaw~~

- Mohsin Khan, Pheiroijam Jotin and Prithvi Shaw were withdrawn from the squad ahead of the series and were replaced by Saransh Jain, Priyojit Singh Kangabam and Kathan Patel respectively.
- Mayank Dagar, Shubham Arora and Abhijeet Saket were added as cover for Harshit Rana, Nishant Sindhu and Riyan Parag, who were not available for the opening fixture due to 2023 ACC Emerging Teams Asia Cup.
- Aryan Juyal and Devdutt Padikkal were replaced by Pratham Singh and Sai Sudharsan respectively ahead of the fourth round of matches.

== Group stage ==
=== Points table ===
Team	Pld	W	L	Tie	N/R	Pts	NRR
South Zone	5	5	0	0	0	20	1.820
East Zone	5	4	1	0	0	16	1.385
West Zone	5	3	2	0	0	12	–0.161
North Zone	5	2	3	0	0	8	–0.179
Central Zone	5	1	4	0	0	4	0.018
North East Zone	5	0	5	0	0	0	–3.302

=== Matches ===
24 July 2023
13:30 (D/N)
Scorecard

South Zone; 303/8 (50 overs)	v	North Zone; 60 (23 overs)
Narayan Jagadeesan 72 (66); Rishi Dhawan 2/30 (4 overs)		Mandeep Singh 18* (45); Vidwath Kaverappa 5/17 (6 overs)

South Zone won by 185 runs (VJD method)
Cricket Association Puducherry Siechem Ground, Puducherry
Umpires: Parashar Joshi and Tapan Sharma

- South Zone won the toss and elected to bat.
- North Zone were set a revised target of 246 runs from 28 overs.

24 July 2023
09:00
Scorecard

Central Zone; 207 (50 overs)	v	East Zone; 208/4 (46.1 overs)
Rinku Singh 54 (63); Manisankar Murasingh 3/29 (10 overs)		Utkarsh Singh 89 (104); Karn Sharma 3/35 (9.1 overs)

East Zone won by 6 wickets
Cricket Association Puducherry Ground 3, Puducherry
Umpires: Madanagopal Kuppuraj and Navdeep Singh

- East Zone won the toss and elected to field.

24 July 2023
09:00
Scorecard

North East Zone; 207 (47 overs)	v	West Zone; 208/1 (25.1 overs)
Imliwati Lemtur 38 (38); Arzan Nagwaswalla 3/31 (7 overs)		Priyank Panchal 99* (69); Lee Yong Lepcha 1/29 (4 overs)

West Zone won by 9 wickets
Cricket Association Puducherry Ground 2, Puducherry
Umpires: Mohamed Rafi and Virender Sharma

- West Zone won the toss and elected to field.
- Anup Ahlawat and Jehu Anderson (North East Zone) both made their List-A debut.

26 July 2023
09:00
Scorecard

North Zone; 307/8 (50 overs)	v	Central Zone; 259 (47.4 overs)
Prabhsimran Singh 121 (107); Venkatesh Iyer 2/50 (7 overs)		Yash Dubey 78 (92); Nitish Rana 4/48 (10 overs)

North Zone won by 48 runs
Cricket Association Puducherry Ground 3, Puducherry
Umpires: Abhijit Bhattacharya and Madanagopal Kuppuraj

- Central Zone won the toss and elected to field.

26 July 2023
13:30 (D/N)
Scorecard

North East Zone; 169 (48 overs)	v	East Zone; 170/2 (31.3 overs)
Rex Rajkumar 65* (74); Riyan Parag 4/30 (10 overs)		Abhimanyu Easwaran 100* (102); Lee Yong Lepcha 2/34 (5 overs)

East Zone won by 8 wickets
Cricket Association Puducherry Ground 3, Puducherry
Umpires: Mohamed Rafi and Virender Sharma

- East Zone won the toss and elected to field.

26 July 2023
09:00
Scorecard

South Zone; 206 (46.4 overs)	v	West Zone; 194 (36.2 overs)
Mayank Agarwal 98 (115); Parth Bhut 3/25 (10 overs)		Sarfaraz Khan 42 (42); R. Sai Kishore 3/44 (9.2 overs)

South Zone won by 12 runs
Cricket Association Puducherry Siechem Ground, Puducherry
Umpires: Tapan Sharma and Navdeep Singh

- West Zone won the toss and elected to field.

28 July 2023
09:00
Scorecard

East Zone; 337/8 (50 overs)	v	North Zone; 249 (45.3 overs)
Riyan Parag 131 (102); Mayank Yadav 4/63 (10 overs)		Mandeep Singh 50 (52); Riyan Parag 4/57 (10 overs)

East Zone won by 88 runs
Cricket Association Puducherry Ground 2, Puducherry
Umpires: Mohamed Rafi and Tapan Sharma

- East Zone won the toss and elected to bat.

28 July 2023
13:30 (D/N)
Scorecard

Central Zone; 243/7 (50 overs)	v	West Zone; 244/9 (49.4 overs)
Yash Dubey 49 (81); Shams Mulani 2/42 (10 overs)		Harvik Desai 57 (86); Shivam Chaudhary 4/18 (10 overs)

West Zone won by 1 wicket
Cricket Association Puducherry Siechem Ground, Puducherry
Umpires: Abhijit Bhattacharya and Navdeep Singh

- Central Zone won the toss and elected to bat.

28 July 2023
09:00
Scorecard

North East Zone; 136 (49.2 overs)	v	South Zone; 137/1 (19.3 overs)
Priyojit Singh Kangabam 40 (104); R. Sai Kishore 3/22 (10 overs)		Rohan Kunnummal 87* (58); Imliwati Lemtur 1/22 (3.3 overs)

South Zone won by 9 wickets
Cricket Association Puducherry Ground 3, Puducherry
Umpires: Parashar Joshi and Virender Sharma

- North East Zone won the toss and elected to bat.

30 July 2023
13:30 (D/N)
Scorecard

North Zone; 259/6 (50 overs)	v	West Zone; 260/4 (48.5 overs)
Shubham Rohilla 56* (52); Shams Mulani 3/29 (10 overs)		Shivam Dube 83* (78); Rishi Dhawan 1/30 (8 overs)

West Zone won by 6 wickets
Cricket Association Puducherry Ground 3, Puducherry
Umpires: Abhijit Bhattacharya and Tapan Sharma

- North Zone won the toss and elected to bat.

30 July 2023
09:00
Scorecard

East Zone; 229 (46 overs)	v	South Zone; 230/5 (44.2 overs)
Virat Singh 49 (67); Vasuki Koushik 3/37 (8 overs)		Mayank Agarwal 84 (88); Avinov Choudhury 2/58 (10 overs)

South Zone won by 5 wickets
Cricket Association Puducherry Siechem Ground, Puducherry
Umpires: Parashar Joshi and Virender Sharma

- East Zone won the toss and elected to bat.

30 July 2023
09:00
Scorecard

North East Zone; 164 (49 overs)	v	Central Zone; 165/2 (33 overs)
Kamsha Yangfo 35 (91); Aditya Sarwate 3/19 (10 overs)		Shivam Chaudhary 85* (90); Imliwati Lemtur 1/39 (8 overs)

Central Zone won by 8 wickets
Cricket Association Puducherry Ground 2, Puducherry
Umpires: Madanagopal Kuppuraj and Navdeep Singh

- Central Zone won the toss and elected to field.

1 August 2023
09:00
Scorecard

North East Zone; 101 (32.1 overs)	v	North Zone; 102/1 (12.5 overs)
Langlonyamba Keishangbam 36 (69); Mayank Markande 4/14 (9.1 overs)		Himanshu Rana 52* (33)

North Zone won by 9 wickets
Cricket Association Puducherry Siechem Ground, Puducherry
Umpires: Abhijit Bhattacharya and Mohamed Rafi

- North East Zone won the toss and elected to bat.

1 August 2023
09:00
Scorecard

East Zone; 319/7 (50 overs)	v	West Zone; 162 (34 overs)
Riyan Parag 102* (68); Shams Mulani 3/45 (10 overs)		Harvik Desai 92 (92); Manisankar Murasingh 5/28 (7 overs)

East Zone won by 157 runs
Cricket Association Puducherry Ground 3, Puducherry
Umpires: Madanagopal Kuppuraj and Tapan Sharma

- East Zone won the toss and elected to bat.

1 August 2023
13:30 (D/N)
Scorecard

Central Zone; 261/9 (50 overs)	v	South Zone; 262/3 (48.2 overs)
Yash Dubey 77 (99); Mohit Redkar 3/51 (9 overs)		Sai Sudharsan 132* (136); Venkatesh Iyer 1/22 (4 overs)

South Zone won by 7 wickets
Cricket Association Puducherry Ground 2, Puducherry
Umpires: Parashar Joshi and Virender Sharma

- Central Zone won the toss and elected to bat.

== Final ==
3 August 2023
13:30 (D/N)
Scorecard

South Zone; 328/8 (50 overs)	v	East Zone; 283 (46.1 overs)
Rohan Kunnummal 107 (75); Utkarsh Singh 2/50 (10 overs)		Riyan Parag 95 (65); Washington Sundar 3/60 (10 overs)

South Zone won by 45 runs
Cricket Association Puducherry Siechem Ground, Puducherry
Umpires: Parashar Joshi and Tapan Sharma
Player of the match: Rohan Kunnummal (South Zone)

- South Zone won the toss and elected to bat.
