= 2017–18 Vijay Hazare Trophy Group A =

Cricket tournament

- Dates: 7 – 16 February 2018
- Administrator(s): BCCI
- Cricket format: List A cricket
- Tournament format(s): Round-robin and Playoff format
- Participants: 7
- Matches: 21

The 2017–18 Vijay Hazare Trophy was the 16th season of the Vijay Hazare Trophy, a List A cricket tournament in India. It was contested by the 28 domestic cricket teams of India. The following seven teams were drawn in Group A: Assam, Baroda, Haryana, Karnataka, Odisha, Punjab and Railways. In December 2017, the fixtures were brought forward to allow players to practice ahead of the 2018 Indian Premier League.

== Points table ==
Pos	Team	Pld	W	L	T	NR	Pts	NRR
1	Baroda	6	5	1	0	0	20	2.012
2	Karnataka	6	4	1	0	1	18	1.489
3	Punjab	6	3	3	0	0	12	0.473
4	Odisha	6	3	3	0	0	12	−0.224
5	Railways	6	3	3	0	0	12	−0.444
6	Haryana	6	2	3	0	1	10	−0.426
7	Assam	6	0	6	0	0	0	−2.401

- Top two teams advanced to the knockout stage

== Fixtures ==
=== Round 1 ===
7 February 2018
Scorecard

Karnataka; 312/9 (50 overs)	v	Baroda; 180/8 (37 overs)
Mayank Agarwal 109 (90); Rishi Arothe 4/59 (9 overs)		Kedar Devdhar 48 (46); Krishnappa Gowtham 4/42 (9 overs)

Karnataka won by 85 runs (VJD method)
Just Cricket Academy Ground, Bengaluru
Umpires: Ulhas Gandhe and Nitin Pandit

- Baroda won the toss and elected to field.
- Urvil Patel (Baroda) made his List A debut.

7 February 2018
Scorecard

Railways; 212 (47.4 overs)	v	Odisha; 213/8 (47 overs)
Arindam Ghosh 48 (82); Abhishek Raut 3/45 (9 overs)		Govinda Poddar 64 (59); Manjeet Singh 5/25 (10 overs)

Odisha won by 2 wickets
KSCA Cricket Ground, Alur
Umpires: Vineet Kulkarni and Virender Sharma

- Odisha won the toss and elected to field.
- Saurabh Rawat (Odisha) made his List A debut.

7 February 2018
Scorecard

Punjab; 247/9 (50 overs)	v	Haryana; 251/8 (49.5 overs)
Yuvraj Singh 43 (77); Jayant Yadav 2/31 (8 overs)		Shubham Rohilla 96 (104); Mayank Markande 2/37 (10 overs)

Haryana won by 2 wickets
KSCA Cricket Ground, Alur
Umpires: Yeshwant Barde and Krishnamachari Srinivasan

- Haryana won the toss and elected to field.
- Abhishek Gupta, Mayank Markande (Punjab) and Ajit Chahal (Haryana) all made their List A debuts.

=== Round 2 ===
8 February 2018
Scorecard

Karnataka; 303/6 (50 overs)	v	Assam; 192 (47.2 overs)
Mayank Agarwal 84 (87); Abu Nechim 2/51 (10 overs)		Sibsankar Roy 64 (93); Prasidh Krishna 6/33 (8.2 overs)

Karnataka won by 111 runs
Just Cricket Academy Ground, Bengaluru
Umpires: Vineet Kulkarni and Virender Sharma

- Assam won the toss and elected to field.
- Abhishek Thakuri and Jitumoni Kalita (Assam) both made their List A debuts.

8 February 2018
Scorecard

Baroda; 250/9 (50 overs)	v	Haryana; 199 (45 overs)
Vishnu Solanki 67 (70); Amit Mishra 3/57 (10 overs)		Shubham Rohilla 61 (89); Swapnil Singh 3/42 (9 overs)

Baroda won by 51 runs
KSCA Cricket Ground, Alur
Umpires: Yeshwant Barde and Krishnamachari Srinivasan

- Baroda won the toss and elected to bat.

8 February 2018
Scorecard

Punjab; 225 (49.5 overs)	v	Odisha; 139 (41 overs)
Gurkeerat Singh 106* (123); Deepak Behera 3/19 (7.5 overs)		Shesdeep Patra 26 (50); Barinder Sran 4/22 (8 overs)

Punjab won by 86 runs
KSCA Cricket Ground, Alur
Umpires: Ulhas Gandhe and Nitin Pandit

- Odisha won the toss and elected to field.
- Roshan Kumar Rao (Odisha) made his List A debut.

=== Round 3 ===
10 February 2018
Scorecard

Railways; 161 (43.1 overs)	v	Assam; 126 (39.3 overs)
Abhishek Yadav 31 (50); Jitumoni Kalita 3/23 (10 overs)		Amit Sinha 39 (63); Amit Mishra 5/21 (8.3 overs)

Railways won by 35 runs
KSCA Cricket Ground, Alur
Umpires: Virender Sharma and Krishnamachari Srinivasan

- Assam won the toss and elected to field.
- Karan Thakur (Railways) made his List A debut.

10 February 2018
Scorecard

Baroda; 167/7 (21 overs)	v	Punjab; 142 (20.5 overs)
Vishnu Solanki 77* (49); Siddarth Kaul 3/36 (5 overs)		Yuvraj Singh 51 (36); Swapnil Singh 2/4 (0.5 overs)

Baroda won by 25 runs
KSCA Cricket Ground, Alur
Umpires: Yeshwant Barde and Ulhas Gandhe

- Punjab won the toss and elected to field.

10 February 2018
Scorecard

Haryana	v	Karnataka

Match abandoned
KSCA Cricket Ground, Alur
Umpires: Vineet Kulkarni and Nitin Pandit

- No toss.

=== Round 4 ===
11 February 2018
Scorecard

Assam; 136 (46.1 overs)	v	Odisha; 137/1 (25.4 overs)
Romario Sharma 49 (60); Suryakant Pradhan 2/14 (8 overs)		Rajesh Dhuper 70* (83); Pritam Das 1/32 (7 overs)

Odisha won by 9 wickets
Just Cricket Academy Ground, Bengaluru
Umpires: Vineet Kulkarni and Virender Sharma

- Odisha won the toss and elected to field.
- Romario Sharma (Assam) made his List A debut.

11 February 2018
Scorecard

Railways; 272/7 (50 overs)	v	Haryana; 221 (45.1 overs)
Mrunal Devdhar 68 (87); Harshal Patel 3/62 (10 overs)		Chaitanya Bishnoi 79 (108); Ankit Yadav 4/36 (10 overs)

Railways won by 51 runs
KSCA Cricket Ground, Alur
Umpires: Yeshwant Barde and Krishnamachari Srinivasan

- Haryana won the toss and elected to field.

11 February 2018
Scorecard

Punjab; 269/3 (42 overs)	v	Karnataka; 265/8 (42 overs)
Shubman Gill 123* (122); Vinay Kumar 2/40 (8 overs)		Lokesh Rahul 107 (91); Siddarth Kaul 3/47 (9 overs)

Punjab won by 4 runs
KSCA Cricket Ground, Alur
Umpires: Ulhas Gandhe and Nitin Pandit

- Punjab won the toss and elected to bat.

=== Round 5 ===
13 February 2018
Scorecard

Punjab; 275/9 (50 overs)	v	Assam; 206 (41.4 overs)
Manan Vohra 78 (101); Pritam Das 3/54 (10 overs)		Riyan Parag 59 (50); Mayank Markande 3/39 (10 overs)

Punjab won by 69 runs
KSCA Cricket Ground, Alur
Umpires: Vineet Kulkarni and Krishnamachari Srinivasan

- Assam won the toss and elected to field.
- Mukhtar Hussain (Assam) made his List A debut.

13 February 2018
Scorecard

Baroda; 357/7 (50 overs)	v	Railways; 165 (37 overs)
Deepak Hooda 161 (124); Amit Mishra 3/55 (10 overs)		Arindam Ghosh 69* (92); Rishi Arothe 2/26 (7 overs)

Baroda won by 192 runs
KSCA Cricket Ground, Alur
Umpires: Yeshwant Barde and Virender Sharma

- Baroda won the toss and elected to bat.
- Prithvi Singh (Railways) made his List A debut.

13 February 2018
Scorecard

Karnataka; 353/6 (50 overs)	v	Odisha; 220 (41 overs)
Mayank Agarwal 102 (94); Debabrata Pradhan 2/69 (9 overs)		Anurag Sarangi 58 (51); Jagadeesha Suchith 5/34 (10 overs)

Karnataka won by 133 runs
KSCA Cricket Ground, Alur
Umpires: Ulhas Gandhe and Nitin Pandit

- Odisha won the toss and elected to field.
- BR Sharath (Karnataka) and Shantanu Mishra (Odisha) both made their List A debuts.

=== Round 6 ===
14 February 2018
Scorecard

Haryana; 323/9 (50 overs)	v	Assam; 237/6 (50 overs)
Rajat Paliwal 76 (78); Mrinmoy Dutta 5/67 (10 overs)		Romario Sharma 97* (91); Harshal Patel 3/51 (10 overs)

Haryana won by 86 runs
Just Cricket Academy Ground, Bengaluru
Umpires: Nitin Pandit and Krishnamachari Srinivasan

- Haryana won the toss and elected to bat.
- Rahul Singh (Assam), Virender Dahiya and Aman Kumar (Haryana) all made their List A debuts.

14 February 2018
Scorecard

Baroda; 317/6 (50 overs)	v	Odisha; 260 (46.4 overs)
Krunal Pandya 84 (73); Abhishek Raut 2/70 (10 overs)		Biplab Samantray 74 (100); Atit Sheth 2/19 (5 overs)

Baroda won by 57 runs
KSCA Cricket Ground, Alur
Umpires: Ulhas Gandhe and Virender Sharma

- Baroda won the toss and elected to bat.
- Ninad Rathva (Baroda) made his List A debut.

14 February 2018
Scorecard

Punjab; 280/8 (50 overs)	v	Railways; 283/6 (49.4 overs)
Manan Vohra 143 (148); Avinash Yadav 2/44 (10 overs)		Arindam Ghosh 89* (100); Mayank Markande 2/35 (10 overs)

Railways won by 4 wickets
KSCA Cricket Ground, Alur
Umpires: Yeshwant Barde and Vineet Kulkarni

- Punjab won the toss and elected to bat.

=== Round 7 ===
16 February 2018
Scorecard

Baroda; 378/7 (50 overs)	v	Assam; 99 (30 overs)
Aditya Waghmode 148 (128); Riyan Parag 2/35 (7 overs)		Parvez Aziz 50 (69); Swapnil Singh 2/0 (2 overs)

Baroda won by 279 runs
KSCA Cricket Ground, Alur
Umpires: Ulhas Gandhe and Nitin Pandit

- Assam won the toss and elected to field.

16 February 2018
Scorecard

Haryana; 170 (45.4 overs)	v	Odisha; 172/1 (31.4 overs)
Sanjay Dhull 72 (113); Deepak Behera 6/22 (10 overs)		Anurag Sarangi 84* (89); Harshal Patel 1/31 (6 overs)

Odisha won by 9 wickets
Just Cricket Academy Ground, Bengaluru
Umpires: Yeshwant Barde and Krishnamachari Srinivasan

- Haryana won the toss and elected to bat
- Sanjay Dhull (Haryana) made his List A debut.

16 February 2018
Scorecard

Karnataka; 257 (48.1 overs)	v	Railways; 241 (47.1 overs)
Mayank Agarwal 89 (94); Anureet Singh 3/36 (10 overs)		Anureet Singh 59 (71); Prasidh Krishna 4/35 (9.1 overs)

Karnataka won by 16 runs
KSCA Cricket Ground, Alur
Umpires: Virender Sharma and Vineet Kulkarni

- Karnataka won the toss and elected to bat.
