= 2023–24 Vijay Hazare Trophy =

List-A cricket tournament in India

- Dates: 23 November – 16 December 2023
- Administrator(s): BCCI
- Cricket format: List A cricket
- Tournament format(s): Round-robin and Playoff format
- Host(s): India
- Champions: Haryana (1st title)
- Runners-up: Rajasthan
- Participants: 38
- Matches: 105
- Player of the series: Sumit Kumar (Haryana)
- Most runs: Arslan Khan (508) (Chandigarh)
- Most wickets: Varun Chakravarthy (19) (Tamil Nadu); Aniket Choudhary (19) (Rajasthan); Siddharth Kaul (19) (Punjab); Harshal Patel (19) (Haryana)

The 2023–24 Vijay Hazare Trophy was the 31st edition of the Vijay Hazare Trophy, an annual List A cricket tournament in India. It was played from 12 November to 16 December 2023. The tournament featured 38 teams, divided into five groups. It was being played in six cities across the country: Bengaluru, Delhi, Kolkata, Mumbai, Ranchi, and Ahmedabad. All knockout matches were played in Rajkot. Saurashtra were the defending champions.

In the final, Haryana defeated Rajasthan by 30 runs to win their maiden title.

== League stage ==
=== Group A ===
Pos	Team	Pld	W	L	NR	Pts	NRR	Qualification
1	Mumbai	7	5	2	0	20	1.158	Advanced to Quarter-final
2	Kerala	7	5	2	0	20	1.553	Advanced to Preliminary quarter-final
3	Tripura	7	4	3	0	16	0.493	
4	Saurashtra	7	4	3	0	16	0.430	
5	Railways	7	4	3	0	16	0.226	
6	Odisha	7	4	3	0	16	−0.161	
7	Pondicherry	7	2	5	0	8	−0.922	
8	Sikkim	7	0	7	0	0	−3.594	

Source: ESPN Cricinfo

=== Group B ===
Pos	Team	Pld	W	L	NR	Pts	NRR	Qualification
1	Vidarbha	7	5	2	0	20	1.349	Advanced to Quarter-final
2	Maharashtra	7	5	2	0	20	0.985	Advanced to Preliminary quarter-final
3	Services	7	5	2	0	20	0.390	
4	Hyderabad	7	4	3	0	16	0.899	
5	Chhattisgarh	7	4	3	0	16	0.451	
6	Jharkhand	7	4	3	0	16	0.136	
7	Meghalaya	7	1	6	0	4	−1.361	
8	Manipur	7	0	7	0	0	−2.866	

Source: ESPN Cricinfo

=== Group C ===
Pos	Team	Pld	W	L	T	NR	Pts	NRR	Qualification
1	Haryana	7	7	0	0	0	28	1.891	Advanced to Quarter-final
2	Karnataka	7	6	1	0	0	24	1.680	Advanced to Quarter-final
3	Uttarakhand	7	5	2	0	0	20	0.691	
4	Delhi	7	3	4	0	0	12	0.418	
5	Chandigarh	7	3	4	0	0	12	0.777	
6	Jammu and Kashmir	7	2	4	0	1	10	−0.456	
7	Mizoram	7	1	6	0	0	4	−3.298	
8	Bihar	7	0	6	0	1	2	−2.116	

Source: ESPN Cricinfo

=== Group D ===
Pos	Team	Pld	W	L	NR	Pts	NRR	Qualification
1	Rajasthan	6	6	0	0	24	1.870	Advanced to Quarter-final
2	Gujarat	6	4	1	1	18	0.910	Advanced to Preliminary quarter-final
3	Uttar Pradesh	6	4	2	0	16	0.833	
4	Himachal Pradesh	6	3	3	0	12	0.824	
5	Andhra	6	1	4	1	6	−0.769	
6	Arunachal Pradesh	6	1	5	0	4	−2.946	
7	Assam	6	1	5	0	4	−0.924	

Source: ESPN Cricinfo

=== Group E ===
Pos	Team	Pld	W	L	NR	Pts	NRR	Qualification
1	Tamil Nadu	6	5	1	0	20	0.944	Advanced to Quarter-final
2	Bengal	6	5	1	0	20	2.100	Advanced to Preliminary quarter-final
3	Madhya Pradesh	6	4	2	0	16	0.478	
4	Baroda	6	3	3	0	12	0.070	
5	Punjab	6	3	3	0	12	0.800	
6	Goa	6	1	5	0	4	−0.303	
7	Nagaland	6	0	6	0	0	−6.273	

Source: ESPN Cricinfo

== Knockout Stage ==
Preliminary QF
D2	Gujarat	283/9 (50 overs)
E2	Bengal	286/2 (46 overs)
A2	Kerala	383/4 (50 overs)
B2	Maharashtra	230 (37.4 overs)

Quarter-finals
E2	Bengal	225 (50 overs)
C1	Haryana	226/6 (45.1 overs)
A1	Mumbai	227 (48.3 overs)
E1	Tamil Nadu	229/3 (43.2 overs)
D1	Rajasthan	267 /8 (50 overs)
A2	Kerala	67 (21 overs)
B1	Vidarbha	173 (44.5 overs)
C2	Karnataka	177/3 (40.3 overs)

Semi-finals
C1	Haryana	293/7 (50 overs)
E1	Tamil Nadu	230 (47.1 overs)
C2	Karnataka	282/8 (50 overs)
D1	Rajasthan	283/4 (43.4 overs)

Final
C1	Haryana	287/8 (50 overs)
D2	Rajasthan	257 (48 overs)

=== Preliminary quarter-finals ===
Preliminary quarter-final 1
9 December 2023
9:00 AM
Scorecard

Gujarat; 283/9 (50 overs)	v	Bengal; 286/2 (46 overs)
Priyank Panchal 101 (114); Suman Das 2/48 (10 overs)		Sudip Kumar Gharami 117* (132); Kathan Patel 1/53 (10 overs)

Bengal won by 8 wickets
Saurashtra Cricket Association Stadium, Ground 'C',Rajkot
Umpires: Abhijit Bengeri and Tapan Sharma

- Bengal won the toss and elected to field
- Suman Das (Bengal) made his List A debut.

Preliminary quarter-final 2
9 December 2023
9:00 AM
Scorecard

Kerala; 383/4 (50 overs)	v	Maharashtra; 230 (37.4 overs)
Krishna Prasad 144 (137); Pradeep Dadhe 1/56 (10 overs)		OM Bhosale 78 (71); Shreyas Gopal 4/35 (8.4 overs)

Kerala won by 153 runs
Saurashtra Cricket Association Stadium, Rajkot
Umpires: Anil Chaudhary and Ulhas Gandhe

- Maharashtra won the toss and elected to field
- Sohan Jamale (Maharashtra) made his List A debut

=== Quarter-finals ===
Quarter-final 1
11 December 2023
Scorecard

Bengal; 225 (50 overs)	v	Haryana; 226/6 (45.1 overs)
Shahbaz Ahmed 100 (118); Yuzvendra Chahal 4/37 (10 overs)		Ankit Kumar 102 (102); Pradipta Pramanik 2/27 (7 overs)

Haryana won by 4 wickets
Saurashtra Cricket Association Stadium, Rajkot
Umpires: Abhijit Bengeri and Nand Kishore
Player of the match: Yuzvendra Chahal (Haryana)

- Haryana won the toss and elected to field.

Quarter-final 2
11 December 2023
Scorecard

Rajasthan; 267/8 (50 overs)	v	Kerala; 67 (21 overs)
Mahipal Lomror 122 (114); Akhin Sathar 3/62 (10 overs)		Sachin Baby 28 (39); Aniket Choudhary 4/26 (7 overs)

Rajasthan won by 200 runs
Saurashtra Cricket Association Stadium, Ground 'C',Rajkot
Umpires: Akshay Totre and Mohamed Rafi
Player of the match: Mahipal Lomror (Rajasthan)

- Kerala won the toss and elected to field.

Quarter-final 3
11 December 2023
Scorecard

Vidarbha; 173 (44.5 overs)	v	Karnataka; 177/3 (40.3 overs)
Shubham Dubey 41 (59); Vijaykumar Vyshak 4/44 (8.5 overs)		Ravikumar Samarth 72* (113); Harsh Dubey 2/32 (10 overs)

Karnataka won by 7 wickets
Sanosara Cricket Ground 'A', Rajkot
Umpires: Parashar Joshi and Saidharshan Kumar
Player of the match: Vijaykumar Vyshak (Karnataka)

- Karnataka won the toss and elected to field.
- Krishnan Shrijith (Karnataka) made his List A debut.

Quarter-final 4
11 December 2023
Scorecard

Mumbai; 227 (48.3 overs)	v	Tamil Nadu; 229/3 (43.2 overs)
Prasad Pawar 59 (58); Varun Chakaravarthy 3/37 (9 overs)		Baba Indrajith 103* (98); Royston Dias 1/46 (8 overs)

Tamil Nadu won by 7 wickets
Sanosara Cricket Ground 'B', Rajkot
Umpires: Ulhas Gandhe and Tapan Sharma
Player of the match: Baba Indrajith (Tamil Nadu)

- Mumbai won the toss and elected to bat.

=== Semi-finals ===
Semi-final 1
13 December 2023
Scorecard

Haryana; 293/7 (50 overs)	v	Tamil Nadu; 230 (47.1 overs)
Himanshu Rana 116 (118); T. Natarajan 3/79 (10 overs)		Baba Indrajith 64 (71); Anshul Kamboj 4/30 (9 overs)

Haryana won by 63 runs
Saurashtra Cricket Association Stadium, Rajkot
Umpires: Tapan Sharma and Parashar Joshi
Player of the match: Himanshu Rana (Haryana)

- Haryana won the toss and elected to bat.

Semi-final 2
14 December 2023
Scorecard

Karnataka; 282/8 (50 overs)	v	Rajasthan; 283/4 (43.4 overs)
Abhinav Manohar 91 (80); Aniket Choudhary 2/43 (10 overs)		Deepak Hooda 180 (128); Vasuki Koushik 1/28 (8 overs)

Rajasthan won by 6 wickets
Saurashtra Cricket Association Stadium, Rajkot
Umpires: Anil Chaudhary and Akshay Totre
Player of the match: Deepak Hooda (Rajasthan)

- Karnataka won the toss and elected to bat

== Final ==
16 December 2023
13:30 (D/N)
Scorecard

Haryana; 287/8 (50 overs)	v	Rajasthan; 257 (48 overs)
Ankit Kumar 88 (91); Aniket Choudhary 4/49 (10 overs)		Abhijeet Tomar 106 (129); Sumit Kumar 3/34 (6 overs)

Haryana won by 30 runs
Saurashtra Cricket Association Stadium, Rajkot
Umpires: Anil Chaudhary and Parashar Joshi
Player of the match: Sumit Kumar (Haryana)

- Haryana won the toss and elected to bat.
