= Amarjit Kaypee =

Indian former cricketer (born 1960)

Personal information
- Born: 2 October 1960 (age 66); Jalandhar, Punjab, India
- Batting: Right-handed
- Bowling: Right-arm off-break
- Role: Batsman

International information
- National side: India

Career statistics
Competition	First-class	List A
Matches	117	32
Runs scored	7,894	682
Batting average	52.27	29.65
100s/50s	27/34	0/5
Top score	210*	70
Balls bowled	78	6
Wickets	1	0
Bowling average	54.00	–
5 wickets in innings	0	–
10 wickets in match	0	–
Best bowling	1/17	–
Catches/stumpings	106/0	12/0
- Source: ESPNcricinfo

Amarjit Kaypee (born 2 October 1960) is an Indian former cricketer. He was primarily a right-handed batsman, and he held the record for the most runs scored in the Ranji Trophy, India's premier domestic first-class cricket competition for a number of years before Amol Muzumdar took the record in 2009. However, despite his success, he was never selected for the Indian national team, an unfortunate feat he shares with the man who broke his record.

== Early life ==
Kaypee was born in a family from Punjab to his father Darshan Singh Kaypee, 5 times MLA, a renowned and a very senior politician at the time and his wife Karam Kaur in Jalandhar on 2 October 1960. One of 7 siblings Kaypee was a student at D.A.V College Jalandhar where he played much of his early college cricket.

== Domestic career and 1990–91 Ranji Trophy Champions ==
Kaypee began his first-class career with Punjab in the 1980–81 season making his debut against Jammu and Kashmir. Having played a few reasonably good seasons for Punjab, he moved to Haryana in 1986–87. It was here where Kaypee played for the rest of his career and where he found much success. Kaypee scored 210 not out in his very first season playing for Haryana which remained his highest career score.

Kaypee's most successful season was in 1990–91 when he scored 940 runs in the Ranji Trophy, helping Haryana to their first and, to date, only Ranji Trophy title. Haryana rode into the finals on the back of the bowling performance of Chetan Sharma and the batting performance of Kaypee, where he scored back-to-back 3 centuries in 3 consecutive innings scoring 127 against services, then mammoth scores of 152 and 173 in the quarter finals against UP, which at the time was a record for Kaypee being the only batsman in the Ranji Trophy history to score 150 plus runs in both innings of the same match. This followed by another brilliant knock of 78 and 102 in the semi-finals against Bengal ensuring Haryana gained a spot and eventually becoming the winners in the 1990-91 Ranji Trophy finals.

Kaypee was the top run-scorer in the competition that year, scoring 5 centuries that season and he was named as an Indian Cricket Cricketer of the Year. The following season he had another prolific Ranji Trophy, scoring 812 runs with 3 centuries including a double ton.

He continued to perform consistently well for Haryana for many seasons, and even captained the team in 31 matches. However, he was only twice selected in the North Zone team for the Duleep Trophy, playing two matches each in the 1991–92 and 1992–93 seasons. As a result, he tended to be overlooked by the national team selectors, and so never made an appearance for the national side.

== Post-retirement ==
In October 2000, Kaypee retired from cricket. He finished his career with a record aggregate of 7623 runs in the Ranji Trophy including 27 centuries, and a record title of being the leading run scorer in Ranji Trophy, a record he carried for a total of 10 years. Post retirement Kaypee was appointed as the head coach for the Haryana Ranji Trophy team for the 2008–09 season. Kaypee was also a match referee for the BCCI from 2007–08 to 2013–14 seasons.

Kaypee once again had been given the charge as the head coach for the Haryana senior men's team for the 2023–24 season, under his guidance and mentorship the team had been performing consistently well in the T20 and List A tournament.

In April 2006 Kaypee was part of the Indian veterans team that visited Pakistan to play a limited-overs 4 match series against a Pakistan Veteran's XI, organised by the Pakistan Seniors Cricket Board. The Indian side was led by former Indian captain Mohammad Azharuddin.

== Overseas Player ==
In the 1980s and 1990s Kaypee had a spell with Smethwick and Streetly Cricket Club, as their overseas player playing in England. Kaypee played his last season during the 1999 English summer before taking retirement from his Domestic Career the following year in 2000.
