= Nirupam Sen =

Nirupam Sen may refer to:

- Nirupam Sen (cricketer)
- Nirupam Sen (diplomat)
- Nirupam Sen (politician)
