= Ravi Balhara =

Indian cricketer (born 1995)

Personal information
- Born: 8 November 1995 (age 31); Bhiwani, Haryana, India
- Source: Cricinfo, 14 December 2018

Ravi Balhara (born 8 November 1995) is an Indian cricketer. He made his first-class debut for Haryana in the 2018–19 Ranji Trophy on 14 December 2018. He made his Twenty20 debut on 15 November 2019, for Haryana in the 2019–20 Syed Mushtaq Ali Trophy.
