= Tinu Kundu =

Indian cricketer (born 1995)

Personal information
- Born: 15 March 1995 (age 31); Rohtak, Haryana, India
- Batting: Right-handed
- Bowling: Slow left-arm orthodox
- Source: Cricinfo, 1 November 2018

Tinu Kundu (born 15 March 1995) is an Indian cricketer. He made his first-class debut for Haryana in the 2018–19 Ranji Trophy on 1 November 2018. In January 2019, in the match against Services, he took his maiden five-wicket haul in first-class cricket. He was the leading wicket-taker for Haryana in the tournament, with 24 dismissals in four matches. He made his List A debut on 11 December 2021, for Haryana in the 2021–22 Vijay Hazare Trophy.
