= Kamla Club Ground =

Multi purpose stadium in Kanpur, India

- Full name: Kamla Club Ground
- Location: Kanpur, Uttar Pradesh
- Owner: Kamla Club
- Operator: Kamla Club
- Capacity: 15,000

Construction
- Groundbreaking: 1932
- Opened: 1932

Website
- ESPNcricinfo

Kamla Club Ground is a multi purpose stadium in Kanpur, Uttar Pradesh. The ground is mainly used for organizing matches of cricket matches and is home of Uttar Pradesh Cricket Association Academy which was established in 1999/00. The stadium has hosted nine first-class matches in 1987 when North Zone cricket team played against South Zone cricket team. The ground hosted eight more first-class matches from 1988 to 2007. The stadium also hosted nine List A matches when Railways cricket team played against Madhya Pradesh cricket team but since then the stadium has hosted non-first-class matches.

The ground has a capacity of 15,000 person and has got 70 meter boundary with facilities of Gymnasium, Dressing Rooms, Bowling machines, video analysis etc.
