= History of cricket in India from 1985–86 to 2000 =

This article describes the history of cricket in India from the 1985–86 season to 2000.

== Events ==
From the 1993–94 season, the Duleep Trophy was converted from a knockout competition to a league format.

Several team names and spellings were altered during the 1990s when traditional Indian names were introduced to replace those that were associated with the British Raj. Most notably, Bombay became Mumbai and the famous venue of Madras became Chennai.

== Domestic cricket ==
=== Ranji Trophy winners ===
- 1985–86 – Delhi
- 1986–87 – Hyderabad
- 1987–88 – Tamil Nadu
- 1988–89 – Delhi
- 1989–90 – Bengal
- 1990–91 – Haryana
- 1991–92 – Delhi
- 1992–93 – Punjab
- 1993–94 – Bombay
- 1994–95 – Bombay
- 1995–96 – Karnataka
- 1996–97 – Mumbai
- 1997–98 – Karnataka
- 1998–99 – Karnataka
- 1999–2000 – Mumbai

=== Duleep Trophy winners ===
- 1985–86 – West Zone
- 1986–87 – South Zone
- 1987–88 – North Zone
- 1988–89 – North Zone & West Zone (shared)
- 1989–90 – South Zone
- 1990–91 – North Zone
- 1991–92 – North Zone
- 1992–93 – North Zone
- 1993–94 – North Zone
- 1994–95 – North Zone
- 1995–96 – South Zone
- 1996–97 – Central Zone
- 1997–98 – Central Zone & West Zone (shared)
- 1998–99 – Central Zone
- 1999–2000 – North Zone

== International tours of India ==
=== 1986–87 Australia ===
- 1st Test at MA Chidambaram Stadium, Chepauk, Madras – tied match
- 2nd Test at Feroz Shah Kotla, Delhi – match drawn
- 3rd Test at Wankhede Stadium, Bombay – match drawn

=== 1986–87 Sri Lanka ===
- 1st Test at Modi Stadium, Kanpur – match drawn
- 2nd Test at Vidarbha Cricket Association Ground, Nagpur – India won by an innings and 106 runs
- 3rd Test at Barabati Stadium, Cuttack – India won by an innings and 67 runs

=== 1986–87 Pakistan ===
- 1st Test at MA Chidambaram Stadium, Chepauk, Madras – match drawn
- 2nd Test at Eden Gardens, Calcutta – match drawn
- 3rd Test at Sawai Mansingh Stadium, Jaipur – match drawn
- 4th Test at Sardar Patel Stadium, Motera, Ahmedabad – match drawn
- 5th Test at M Chinnaswamy Stadium, Bangalore – Pakistan won by 16 runs

For details of this tour, see : Pakistani cricket team in India in 1986–87

=== 1987–88 West Indies ===
- 1st Test at Feroz Shah Kotla, Delhi – West Indies won by 5 wickets
- 2nd Test at Wankhede Stadium, Bombay – match drawn
- 3rd Test at Eden Gardens, Calcutta – match drawn
- 4th Test at MA Chidambaram Stadium, Chepauk, Madras – India won by 255 runs

=== 1988–89 New Zealand ===
- 1st Test at M Chinnaswamy Stadium, Bangalore – India won by 172 runs
- 2nd Test at Wankhede Stadium, Bombay – New Zealand won by 136 runs
- 3rd Test at Lal Bahadur Shastri Stadium, Hyderabad – India won by 10 wickets

=== 1990–91 Sri Lanka ===
- 1st Test at Sector 16 Stadium, Chandigarh – India won by an innings and 8 runs

=== 1991–92 South Africa ===
This tour marked South Africa's return to official international cricket. A series of three Limited Overs Internationals was won 2–1 by India.

For details of this tour, see : South African cricket team in India in 1991–92

=== 1992–93 England ===
- 1st Test at Eden Gardens, Calcutta – India won by 8 wickets
- 2nd Test at MA Chidambaram Stadium, Chepauk, Madras – India won by an innings and 22 runs
- 3rd Test at Wankhede Stadium, Bombay – India won by an innings and 15 runs

For details of this tour, see : English cricket team in India in 1992–93

=== 1992–93 Zimbabwe ===
- 1st Test at Feroz Shah Kotla, Delhi – India won by an innings and 13 runs

=== 1993–94 Sri Lanka ===
- 1st Test at KD Singh Babu Stadium, Lucknow – India won by an innings and 119 runs
- 2nd Test at M Chinnaswamy Stadium, Bangalore – India won by an innings and 95 runs
- 3rd Test at Sardar Patel Stadium, Motera, Ahmedabad – India won by an innings and 17 runs

=== 1994–95 West Indies ===
- 1st Test at Wankhede Stadium, Bombay – India won by 96 runs
- 2nd Test at Vidarbha Cricket Association Ground, Nagpur – match drawn
- 3rd Test at Punjab Cricket Association Stadium, Mohali – West Indies won by 243 runs

=== 1995–96 New Zealand ===
- 1st Test at M Chinnaswamy Stadium, Bangalore – India won by 8 wickets
- 2nd Test at MA Chidambaram Stadium, Chepauk, Madras – match drawn
- 3rd Test at Barabati Stadium, Cuttack – match drawn

=== 1996–97 Australia ===
- 1st Test at Feroz Shah Kotla, Delhi – India won by 7 wickets

=== 1996–97 South Africa ===
- 1st Test at Sardar Patel Stadium, Motera, Ahmedabad – India won by 64 runs
- 2nd Test at Eden Gardens, Calcutta – South Africa won by 329 runs
- 3rd Test at Modi Stadium, Kanpur – India won by 280 runs

=== 1997–98 Sri Lanka ===
- 1st Test at Punjab Cricket Association Stadium, Mohali – match drawn
- 2nd Test at Vidarbha Cricket Association Ground, Nagpur – match drawn
- 3rd Test at Wankhede Stadium, Mumbai – match drawn

=== 1997–98 Australia ===
- 1st Test at MA Chidambaram Stadium, Chepauk, Chennai – India won by 179 runs
- 2nd Test at Eden Gardens, Calcutta – India won by an innings and 219 runs
- 3rd Test at M Chinnaswamy Stadium, Bangalore – Australia won by 8 wickets

=== 1998–99 Pakistan ===
- 1st Test at MA Chidambaram Stadium, Chepauk, Chennai – Pakistan won by 12 runs
- 2nd Test at Feroz Shah Kotla, Delhi – India won by 212 runs

=== 1999–2000 New Zealand ===
- 1st Test at Punjab Cricket Association Stadium, Mohali – match drawn
- 2nd Test at Modi Stadium, Kanpur – India won by 8 wickets
- 3rd Test at Sardar Patel Stadium, Motera, Ahmedabad – match drawn

=== 1999–2000 South Africa ===
- 1st Test at Wankhede Stadium, Mumbai – South Africa Won by 4 wickets
- 2nd Test at M Chinnaswamy Stadium, Bangalore – South Africa won by an innings and 71 runs

== External sources ==
- CricketArchive – Itinerary of Events in India
