= Prashant Vashist =

Indian cricketer (born 1998)

Personal information
- Full name: Prashant Vashist
- Born: 15 September 1998 (age 28)
- Source: Cricinfo, 20 November 2018

Prashant Vashist (born 15 September 1998) is an Indian cricketer. He made his first-class debut for Haryana in the 2018–19 Ranji Trophy on 20 November 2018.
