= Lakshay Garg =

Indian cricketer (born 1995)

Personal information
- Full name: Lakshay Arunkumar Garg
- Born: 10 October 1995 (age 31); Mapusa, Goa, India
- Source: ESPNcricinfo, 25 November 2017

Lakshay Garg (born 10 October 1995) is an Indian cricketer. He plays for Goa as an All-rounder.

He made his List A debut on 2 March 2014, for Goa in the 2013–14 Vijay Hazare Trophy. He made his first-class debut for Goa in the 2017–18 Ranji Trophy on 25 November 2017. The following month, in the match against Assam, he took his maiden five-wicket haul in first-class cricket. He was the leading wicket-taker for Goa in the 2018–19 Ranji Trophy, with 37 dismissals in eight matches.
