= North Zone cricket team =

First-class cricket team in Northern India

- Association: Board of Control for Cricket in India

History
- Duleep Trophy wins: 18
- Deodhar Trophy wins: 12
- Syed Mushtaq Ali Trophy wins: 0

The North Zone cricket team is a first-class cricket team that represents northern India in the Duleep Trophy and Deodhar Trophy. It is a composite team of players from seven first-class Indian teams from northern India competing in the Ranji Trophy: Chandigarh, Delhi, Haryana, Himachal Pradesh, Jammu and Kashmir, Punjab and Services. North Zone has the strongest track record of all the zones in the Duleep Trophy, as they have won the Trophy 17 times, with the next best team, West Zone having won 16 times. They hold the record for the most consecutive titles, five, from 1990/91 through to 1994/95.

== Current squad ==
Players with international caps are listed in bold. Updated as on 24 Jul 2023

| Name | Domestic team | Birth date | Batting Style | Bowling Style | Format | Notes |
Batsmen
| Manan Vohra | Chandigarh | 18 July 1993 (age 33) | Right-handed | Right arm medium | First-class | |
| Dhruv Shorey | Delhi | 5 July 1992 (age 34) | Right-handed | Right arm off break | First-class | |
| Prashant Chopra | Himachal Pradesh | 7 October 1992 (age 33) | Right-handed | Right arm leg break | First-class | |
| Ankit Kalsi | Himachal Pradesh | 26 September 1993 (age 32) | Left-handed | Slow left-arm orthodox | First-class | |
| Ankit Kumar | Haryana | 1 November 1997 (age 28) | Right-handed | Right arm off break | First-class | |
| Nehal Wadhera | Punjab | 4 September 2000 (age 25) | Left-handed | Right arm leg break | First-class | |
| **Mandeep Singh** | Punjab | 18 December 1991 (age 34) | Right-handed | Right arm medium | List A | |
| Shubham Khajuria | Jammu & Kashmir | 13 September 1995 (age 30) | Right-handed | Right arm off break | List A | |
| Vivrant Sharma | Jammu & Kashmir | 13 September 1995 (age 30) | Left-handed | Right arm leg break | List A | |
| Himanshu Rana | Haryana | 1 October 1998 (age 27) | Right-handed | Right arm medium-fast | List A | |
| Shubham Rohilla | Services | 10 March 1998 (age 28) | Left-handed | Right arm leg break | List A | |
All-rounders
| Nishant Sindhu | Haryana | 9 April 2004 (age 22) | Left-handed | Slow left-arm orthodox | First-class & List A | |
| **Rishi Dhawan** | Himachal Pradesh | 19 February 1990 (age 36) | Right-handed | Right arm medium-fast | List A | |
| **Nitish Rana** | Delhi | 27 December 1993 (age 32) | Right-handed | Right arm off break | List A | List A Captain |
| Abhishek Sharma | Punjab | 4 September 2000 (age 25) | Left-handed | Slow left-arm orthodox | List A | |
Wicket-keepers
| Prabhsimran Singh | Punjab | 10 August 2000 (age 26) | Right-handed | - | First-class & List A | |
| Shubham Arora | Himachal Pradesh | 26 October 1997 (age 28) | Left-handed | - | List A | |
Spin Bowlers
| **Jayant Yadav** | Haryana | 22 January 1990 (age 36) | Right-handed | Right arm off break | First-class | First-class Captain |
| Pulkit Narang | Services | 18 June 1994 (age 32) | Right-handed | Right arm off break | First-class | |
| Abid Mushtaq | Jammu & Kashmir | 17 January 1997 (age 29) | Left-handed | Slow left-arm orthodox | First-class | |
| **Mayank Markande** | Punjab | 11 November 1997 (age 28) | Right-handed | Right arm leg break | List A | |
| Mayank Dagar | Himachal Pradesh | 11 November 1996 (age 29) | Right-handed | Slow left-arm orthodox | List A | |
Pace Bowlers
| **Siddarth Kaul** | Punjab | 19 May 1990 (age 36) | Right-handed | Right-arm medium-fast | First-class | |
| Baltej Dhanda | Punjab | 4 November 1990 (age 35) | Right-handed | Right arm medium-fast | First-class | |
| Harshit Rana | Delhi | 22 December 2001 (age 24) | Right-handed | Right arm medium-fast | First-class & List A | |
| Vaibhav Arora | Himachal Pradesh | 14 December 1997 (age 28) | Right-handed | Right arm medium-fast | First-class & List A | |
| **Sandeep Sharma** | Chandigarh | 18 May 1993 (age 33) | Right-handed | Right-arm medium-fast | List A | |
| **Mayank Yadav** | Delhi | 17 June 2002 (age 24) | Right-handed | Right-arm medium-fast | List A | |

== Notable players from North Zone ==
- Kapil Dev
- Gautam Gambhir
- Dinesh Mongia
- Virender Sehwag
- Ishant Sharma
- Navjot Singh Sidhu
- Harbhajan Singh
- Yuvraj Singh
- Lala Amarnath
- Surinder Amarnath
- Mohinder Amarnath
- Virat Kohli
- Bishen Singh Bedi
- Aakash Chopra

North Zone also had the services of some very famous Pakistani cricketers before partition, such as

- Dr Jehangir Khan
- Dilawar Hussain
- Gul Mohammad
- Nazar Mohammad
- A H Kardar
- Fazal Mahmood
- Imtiaz Ahmed
- Akshay Patel
