= Pratyush Singh =

Indian cricketer (born 1994)

Personal information
- Born: 4 September 1994 (age 32); Hazaribagh, Jharkhand, India
- Batting: Right-handed
- Bowling: Right-arm leg-break
- Role: All rounder

Domestic team information
- Years: Team
- 2013/14–2014/15: Delhi
- 2016/17–2017/18: Jharkhand
- 2018/19–2020/21: Tripura
- 2021/22: Bihar

Career statistics
Competition	FC	List A	T20
Matches	19	14	23
Runs scored	973	219	141
Batting average	27.80	15.64	7.83
100s/50s	1/4	0/0	0/0
Top score	110	47	39
Balls bowled	33	306	139
Wickets	4	8	5
Bowling average	85.25	35.00	35.40
5 wickets in innings	0	0	0
10 wickets in match	0	0	0
Best bowling	1/1	2/21	2/1
Catches/stumpings	19/-	4/–	9/-
- Source: ESPNcricinfo, 9 November 2021

Pratyush Singh (born 4 September 1994) is an Indian former first-class cricketer who played for Delhi, Jharkhand, Tripura and Bihar in domestic cricket. He was a right-arm leg-break bowler. He was a member of the Chennai Super Kings squad in 2015. He made his first-class debut for Jharkhand in the 2016–17 Ranji Trophy on 20 October 2016. He made his List A debut for Jharkhand in the 2016–17 Vijay Hazare Trophy on 15 March 2017.

In December 2018, while batting for Tripura against Goa in the 2018–19 Ranji Trophy, he scored his maiden century on his first-class debut. He was the leading run-scorer for Tripura in the tournament, with 464 runs in eight matches.
