= Joydeep Banik =

Indian cricketer (born 1993)

Personal information
- Full name: Joydeep Ratish Banik
- Born: 25 February 1993 (age 33); Kamalpur, Tripura

Domestic team information
- Years: Team
- 2018–19: Tripura
- Source: ESPNcricinfo, 6 March 2017

Joydeep Banik (born 25 February 1993) is an Indian cricketer. He made his List A debut for Tripura in the 2016–17 Vijay Hazare Trophy on 6 March 2017. He made his first-class debut for Tripura in the 2018–19 Ranji Trophy on 14 December 2018. He made his Twenty20 debut for Tripura in the 2018–19 Syed Mushtaq Ali Trophy on 21 February 2019.
