= Govind Sharma =

Indian cricketer (born 2002)

Personal information
- Born: 10 October 2002 (age 24); Jammu, India
- Source: ESPNcricinfo, 7 January 2019

Govind Sharma (born 10 October 2002) is an Indian cricketer. He made his first-class debut for Jammu & Kashmir in the 2018–19 Ranji Trophy on 7 January 2019.
