= Rahul Prasad (cricketer, born 1993) =

Indian cricketer (born 1993)

Personal information
- Born: 9 May 1993 (age 33); Dhanbad, Bihar
- Batting: Left-handed
- Bowling: Slow left arm orthodox

Domestic team information
- Years: Team
- 2018–19: Jharkhand
- Source: Cricinfo, 28 November 2018

Rahul Prasad (born 9 May 1993) is an Indian cricketer. He made his first-class debut for Jharkhand in the 2018–19 Ranji Trophy on 28 November 2018.
