= Ninad Kadam =

Indian cricketer (born 1992)

Personal information
- Full name: Ninad Nitin Kadam
- Born: 16 November 1992 (age 33); Bombay, Maharashtra
- Source: ESPNcricinfo, 3 October 2018

Ninad Kadam (born 16 November 1992) is an Indian cricketer. He made his List A debut for Tripura in the 2018–19 Vijay Hazare Trophy on 3 October 2018. He made his first-class debut for Tripura in the 2018–19 Ranji Trophy on 1 November 2018. He made his Twenty20 debut for Tripura in the 2018–19 Syed Mushtaq Ali Trophy on 21 February 2019.
