= Ravinder Chadha =

Indian cricketer and doctor (born 1951)

Personal information
- Born: 16 March 1951 (age 75); Jalandhar, Punjab, India
- Batting: Right-handed
- Bowling: Right-arm medium
- Role: All-rounder

Domestic team information
- Years: Team
- 1967/68: Southern Punjab
- 1968/69–1969/70: Punjab
- 1970/71–1987/88: Haryana

Career statistics
Competition	FC	List A
Matches	114	15
Runs scored	5,215	177
Batting average	33.42	14.75
100s/50s	10/26	0/0
Top score	168	33
Balls bowled	6,930	588
Wickets	129	12
Bowling average	26.31	30.00
5 wickets in innings	4	0
10 wickets in match	0	n/a
Best bowling	6/35	4/31
Catches/stumpings	99/–	7/–
- Source: ESPNcricinfo, 5 October 2017

Ravinder Chadha (born 16 March 1951) is an Indian former first-class cricketer and doctor. He captained Haryana in 83 Ranji Trophy matches, a tournament record till 2015 when it was bettered by Jaydev Shah. Chadha also served as a physiotherapist for the Indian team.

== Life and career ==
Chadha was born on 16 March 1951 in Jalandhar. An all-rounder who batted right-handed and bowled right-arm medium pace, Chadha made his first-class debut at age 16 for Southern Punjab during the 1967–68 Ranji Trophy. He played the subsequent two seasons for Punjab, before switching to the newly founded Haryana team. He represented Haryana for 18 seasons from 1970–71 to 1987–88, captaining the team in 83 Ranji Trophy matches. This was the record for most matches as captain in the history of Ranji Trophy, until Saurashtra cricketer Jaydev Shah broke it in 2015. Chadha appeared in a total of 114 first-class matches, scoring 5,215 runs and taking 129 wickets.

Chadha was employed with Haryana Power Utilities for 33 years, until his retirement as its director of medical services in 2009. He treated sports injuries and runs a pain-management clinic in Sector 22 in Chandigarh. Chadha also worked as a selector for the Board of Control for Cricket in India and a physiotherapist for the national team for two years including at the 1999 Cricket World Cup. He is a recipient of the Haryana government's Bhim Award.
