= Subham Ghosh =

Indian cricketer (born 1998)

Personal information
- Full name: Subham Shyamal Ghosh
- Born: 7 October 1998 (age 28); Khowai, Tripura
- Source: Cricinfo, 12 November 2018

Subham Ghosh (born 7 October 1998) is an Indian cricketer. He made his first-class debut for Tripura in the 2018–19 Ranji Trophy on 12 November 2018. He made his Twenty20 debut on 18 January 2021, for Tripura in the 2020–21 Syed Mushtaq Ali Trophy. He made his List A debut on 28 February 2021, for Tripura in the 2020–21 Vijay Hazare Trophy.
