= Vijesh Prabhudessai =

Indian cricketer (born 1997)

Personal information
- Full name: Vijesh Mahesh Prabhudessai
- Born: 20 February 1997 (age 29)
- Source: Cricinfo, 8 January 2018

Vijesh Prabhudessai (born 20 February 1997) is an Indian cricketer. He made his Twenty20 debut for Goa in the 2017–18 Zonal T20 League on 8 January 2018. He made his List A debut for Goa in the 2017–18 Vijay Hazare Trophy on 6 February 2018. He made his first-class debut for Goa in the 2018–19 Ranji Trophy on 28 November 2018.
