= Rahul Rawat =

Indian cricketer (born 1996)

Personal information
- Full name: Rahul Singh Rawat
- Born: 3 October 1996 (age 30); Lucknow, Uttar Pradesh, India
- Batting: Left-handed
- Bowling: Right-arm off spin
- Role: Batter

Domestic team information
- Years: Team
- 2014-2019: Uttar Pradesh
- 2022-present: Railways
- Source: Cricinfo, 15 January 2019

Rahul Rawat (born 3 October 1996) is an Indian cricketer. He made his first-class debut for Uttar Pradesh in the 2018–19 Ranji Trophy on 15 January 2019.
