= Madhur Khatri =

Indian cricketer (born 1987)

Personal information
- Born: 25 June 1987 (age 39); Bikaner, Rajasthan, India
- Batting: Right-handed
- Bowling: Right-arm off break
- Source: ESPNcricinfo, 6 October 2015

Madhur Khatri (born 25 June 1987) is an Indian cricketer who played for Rajasthan. Ahead of the 2018–19 Ranji Trophy, he transferred from Rajasthan to Railways.
