= Sanjay Dhull =

Indian cricketer (born 1996)

Personal information
- Born: 8 October 1996 (age 30)
- Batting: Left-handed
- Bowling: Slow left-arm orthodox

Domestic team information
- Years: Team
- 2018: Haryana
- Source: Cricinfo, 11 November 2020

Sanjay Dhull (born 8 October 1996) is an Indian cricketer. He made his List A debut for Haryana in the 2017–18 Vijay Hazare Trophy on 16 February 2018.
