= Vishamber Kahlon =

Indian cricketer (born 1996)

Personal information
- Full name: Vishamber Gurinder Kahlon
- Born: 26 November 1996 (age 29); Baroda, Gujarat, India
- Source: Cricinfo, 2 October 2018

Vishamber Kahlon (born 26 November 1996) is an Indian cricket player. He made his List A debut for Goa in the 2018–19 Vijay Hazare Trophy on 2 October 2018. He made his first-class debut for Goa in the 2018–19 Ranji Trophy on 28 November 2018.
