= Kumar Deobrat =

Indian cricketer (born 1992)

Personal information
- Full name: Kumar Deobrat Singh
- Born: 24 October 1992 (age 34); Bokaro, Jharkhand, India
- Batting: Right-handed
- Role: Batsman

Domestic team information
- Years: Team
- 2011–present: Jharkhand

Career statistics
Competition	FC	LA	T20
Matches	17	27	16
Runs scored	558	818	282
Batting average	23.25	40.90	21.69
100s/50s	0/3	0/5	0/1
Top score	75	84	69*
Catches/stumpings	7/–	8/–	2/–
- Source: ESPNcricinfo, 28 March 2015

Kumar Deobrat Singh (born 24 October 1992) is an Indian cricketer who plays for Jharkhand cricket team. Deobrat is a right-handed batsman. In January 2015, Deobrat became the captain of Jharkhand for all forms of the game, replacing Saurabh Tiwary at the position. Deobrat has represented Jharkhand at different age-group levels such as Under-16, Under-19, Under-22 and Under-25. During the 2011/12 season, he was a member of the India Under-19 cricket team. In September 2011, he was named the vice-captain of the India Under-19 team. He has been a member of East Zone cricket team since the 2013/14 season.

He was the leading run-scorer for Jharkhand in the 2018–19 Ranji Trophy, with 631 runs in seven matches.
