= Rahul Shah =

Indian cricketer (born 1997)

Personal information
- Full name: Rahul Vipul Shah
- Born: 3 January 1997 (age 29); Ahmedabad, Gujarat, India
- Batting: Left-handed
- Bowling: Right arm off break
- Source: Cricinfo, 11 February 2018

Rahul Shah (born 3 January 1997) is an Indian cricketer. He made his List A debut for Gujarat in the 2017–18 Vijay Hazare Trophy on 11 February 2018. He made his first-class debut for Gujarat in the 2018–19 Ranji Trophy on 15 January 2019. He made his Twenty20 debut on 4 November 2021, for Gujarat in the 2021–22 Syed Mushtaq Ali Trophy.
