= Neelambuj Vats =

Indian cricketer (born 1995)

Personal information
- Born: 21 November 1995 (age 30)
- Source: ESPNcricinfo, 30 December 2018

Neelambuj Vats (born 24 November 1995) is an Indian cricketer. He made his first-class debut for Tripura in the 2018–19 Ranji Trophy on 30 December 2018, taking his first five-wicket haul in the first innings. He made his Twenty20 debut on 11 November 2019, for Tripura in the 2019–20 Syed Mushtaq Ali Trophy.
