= Rajesh Mohanty =

Indian cricketer (born 2000)

Personal information
- Born: 20 May 2000 (age 26); Nayagarh, Odisha, India
- Batting: Left-handed
- Bowling: Right arm medium
- Role: Bowler
- Source: Cricinfo, 20 September 2018

Rajesh Mohanty (born 20 May 2000) is an Indian cricketer. He made his List A debut for Odisha in the 2018–19 Vijay Hazare Trophy on 20 September 2018. He made his first-class debut for Odisha in the 2018–19 Ranji Trophy on 1 November 2018. In the third round of the tournament, in the match against Assam, he took his maiden ten-wicket match haul in first-class cricket. He made his Twenty20 debut for Odisha in the 2018–19 Syed Mushtaq Ali Trophy on 21 February 2019.

In August 2019, he was named in the India Green team's squad for the 2019–20 Duleep Trophy.
