= Poonish Mehta =

Indian cricketer (born 1993)

Personal information
- Born: 4 November 1993 (age 33); Gurgaon, India
- Batting: Right handed
- Bowling: Right arm medium

Domestic team information
- Years: Team
- 2015–16: Haryana
- Source: Cricinfo, 10 January 2016

Poonish Mehta (born 4 November 1993) is an Indian cricketer who plays for Haryana. He made his List A debut on 13 December 2015 in the 2015–16 Vijay Hazare Trophy. He made his Twenty20 debut on 7 January 2016 in the 2015–16 Syed Mushtaq Ali Trophy.
