= Amit Mishra (disambiguation) =

Amit Mishra (born 1982) is an Indian cricketer.

Amit Mishra may also refer to:

- Amit Mishra (cricketer, born 1991), Indian cricketer
- Amit Mishra (cricketer, born 1988), Indian cricketer
- Amit Mishra (singer) (born 1989), Indian singer, songwriter and voice actor
