= Ajay Yadav =

Indian cricketer (born 1986)

Personal information
- Full name: Ajay Radhe Singh Yadav
- Born: 18 December 1986 (age 39); Ranchi, Jharkhand
- Batting: Right-handed
- Bowling: Right-arm medium-fast

Career statistics
Competition	FC	LA	T20
Matches	18	1	2
Runs scored	34	1	1
Batting average	2.42	1.00	1.00
100s/50s	0/0	0/0	0/0
Top score	8*	1*	1
Balls bowled	2927	54	24
Wickets	58	1	0
Bowling average	19.15	49.00	–
5 wickets in innings	4	0	–
10 wickets in match	2	0	–
Best bowling	11/73	1/49	–
Catches/stumpings	4/–	0/0	0/–
- Source: ESPNcricinfo, 1 January 2017

Ajay Yadav (born 18 December 1986) is an Indian cricket player who as of 2 January 2017 plays for Jharkhand in the Ranji Trophy, the domestic first-class cricket competition in India. He is a right-hand batsman and right-arm medium-fast bowler.

Yadav has played two Twenty20 matches for Jharkhand.

== Personal life ==
Yadav's parents died when he was young, and he continued their family dairy business.
