= Madhav Kaushik =

Indian cricketer (born 1998)

Personal information
- Born: 3 January 1998 (age 28); Delhi, India
- Batting: Right-handed
- Bowling: Right arm off break

Domestic team information
- Years: Team
- 2018–present: Uttar Pradesh
- Source: ESPNcricinfo, 1 November 2018

Madhav Kaushik (born 3 January 1998) is an Indian cricketer. He made his first-class debut for Uttar Pradesh in the 2018–19 Ranji Trophy on 1 November 2018. He made his Twenty20 debut for Uttar Pradesh in the 2018–19 Syed Mushtaq Ali Trophy on 12 March 2019. He made his List A debut on 17 October 2019, for Uttar Pradesh in the 2019–20 Vijay Hazare Trophy.
