= Romario Sharma =

Indian cricketer (born 1994)

Personal information
- Full name: Romariomomin Runu Sharma
- Born: 19 December 1994 (age 31); Kamrup, Assam, India
- Batting: Left-handed
- Bowling: Right-arm offbreak
- Role: Batsman

Domestic team information
- Years: Team
- 2015 - present: Assam
- Source: Cricinfo, 11 February 2018

Romario Sharma (born 19 December 1994) is an Indian cricketer. He made his List A debut for Assam in the 2017–18 Vijay Hazare Trophy on 11 February 2018. He made his first-class debut for Assam in the 2018–19 Ranji Trophy on 20 November 2018.
