= Chaudhary Bansi Lal Cricket Stadium =

Cricket stadium in Haryana, India

Coordinates: 28.854°N 76.464°E

- CH Bansi Lal Cricket Stadium
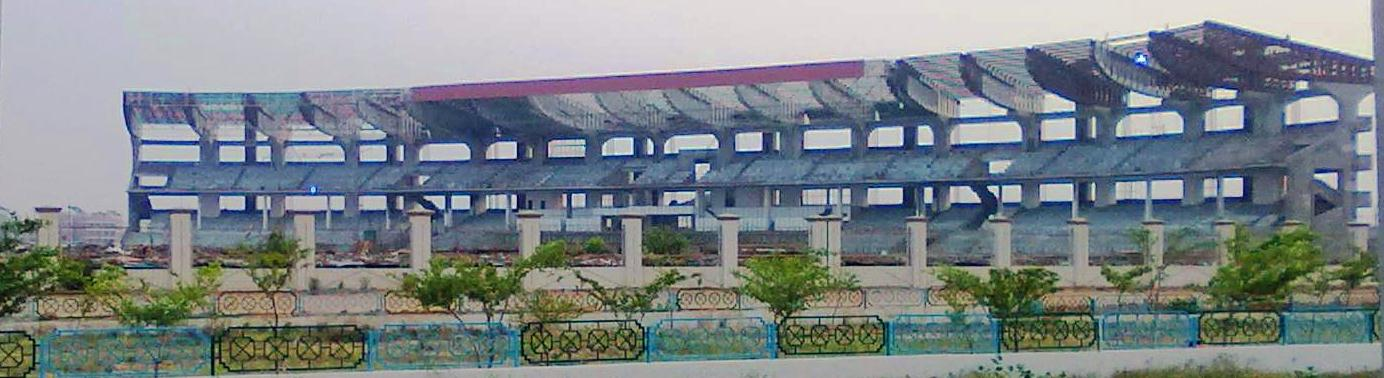
- Interactive map of Chaudhary Bansi Lal Cricket Stadium
- Location: Lahli, Rohtak, Haryana
- Country: India
- Establishment: 2006
- Capacity: 10,000
- Owner: Haryana Cricket Association
- Operator: Haryana Cricket Association
- Tenants: Haryana cricket team
- End names
- n/a n/a

Chaudhary Bansi Lal Cricket Stadium is a cricket ground near State Highway 16 in Lahli, Haryana. The stadium accommodates 10,000 spectators and came to prominence when Sachin Tendulkar played his last Ranji Trophy match here in October 2013.

The pitch remains lively as the water-level is unusually high in Lahli. At places, water is found only two to four feet below the ground, and that helps in keeping the pitch and outfield green.

The venue made its first-class debut with a Haryana-Andhra game in November 2006. The highest team total here has been 529-6 declared by Orissa against Haryana in the 2015/16 season. The highest individual score at this ground was scored by Natraj Behera (255*) for Orissa against Haryana in 2015/16.

== See also ==
- Dominence of Haryana in sports
