= Vikas Hathwala =

Indian cricketer (born 1993)

Personal information
- Full name: Vikas Singh Hathwala
- Born: 6 September 1993 (age 33); Delhi, India
- Batting: Left-handed
- Bowling: Left-arm medium

Domestic team information
- Years: Team
- 2015: Services
- Source: Cricinfo, 25 October 2015

Vikas Hathwala (born 6 September 1993) is an Indian cricketer who plays for Services. He made his first-class debut on 22 October 2015 in the 2015–16 Ranji Trophy.
