= Utkarsh Singh =

Indian cricketer (born 1998)

Personal information
- Born: 7 May 1998 (age 28); Ranchi, Bihar (now Jharkhand), India

Domestic team information
- Years: Team
- 2018- present: Jharkhand
- 2021-present: Punjab Kings
- Source: Cricinfo, 9 November 2017

Utkarsh Singh (born 7 May 1998) is an Indian cricketer.

He made his first-class debut for Jharkhand in the 2017–18 Ranji Trophy on 9 November 2017. He made his List A debut for Jharkhand in the 2017–18 Vijay Hazare Trophy on 11 February 2018. In December 2018, during the 2018–19 Ranji Trophy match against Jharkhand, he scored his maiden century in first-class cricket. He made his Twenty20 debut for Jharkhand in the 2018–19 Syed Mushtaq Ali Trophy on 24 February 2019.

In February 2021, Singh was bought by the Punjab Kings in the IPL auction ahead of the 2021 Indian Premier League.
