= Avinov Choudhury =

Indian cricketer (born 1999)

Personal information
- Full name: Avinov Arup Choudhury
- Born: 1 December 1999 (age 26); Guwahati, Assam, India
- Batting: Right-handed
- Bowling: Slow left-arm orthodox

Domestic team information
- Years: Team
- 2022–present: Assam
- Source: ESPNcricinfo, 6 October 2017

Avinov Choudhury (born 1 December 1999) is an Indian cricketer who plays for Assam in domestic cricket. He is a slow left-arm orthodox bowler.

He made his List A debut for Assam in the 2022–23 Vijay Hazare Trophy against Rajasthan on 12 November 2022. He made his Twenty20 debut on 18 October 2022, against Railways in the 2022–23 Syed Mushtaq Ali Trophy.
