= Owais Shah (Indian cricketer) =

Indian cricketer

Personal information
- Full name: Owais Amin Shah
- Born: 14 October 1990 (age 36); Srinagar, Kashmir
- Batting: Right-hand bat
- Bowling: Legbreak googly

Domestic team information
- Years: Team
- 2012-: Jammu & Kashmir

Career statistics
Competition	First-class	List A	T20
Matches	14	3	5
Runs scored	638	68	5
Batting average	25.52	22.66	1.66
100s/50s	0/5	0/1	0/0
Top score	84	59	3
Balls bowled	78	0	0
Wickets	2	0	0
Bowling average	14.50	0	0
5 wickets in innings	0	0	0
10 wickets in match	0	0	0
Best bowling	2/17	0	0
Catches/stumpings	3/0	0/0	1/0
- Source: Cricinfo, 3 December 2025

Owais Amin Shah (born 14 October 1990) is an Indian cricketer who has played for Jammu and Kashmir in Indian domestic cricket. He is a right-handed batsman and left-arm leg spin bowler.

A former state under-19s player, Shah made his first-class debut for Jammu and Kashmir in December 2012, playing against Kerala in the 2012–13 Ranji Trophy. He played three Ranji Trophy matches in his debut season, and also appeared once in the 2012–13 Vijay Hazare Trophy (a limited-overs competition). In the 2013–14 Ranji Trophy, however, Shah appeared only once.
