= Nirupam Sen (cricketer) =

Indian cricketer (born 1990)

Personal information
- Full name: Nirupam Nirmal Sen
- Born: 28 February 1990 (age 36); Kanchannagar, Tripura, India
- Source: ESPNcricinfo, 10 January 2016

Nirupam Sen (born 28 February 1990) is an Indian cricketer who plays for Tripura. He made his Twenty20 debut on 2 January 2016 in the 2015–16 Syed Mushtaq Ali Trophy. He made his first-class debut for Tripura in the 2018–19 Ranji Trophy on 30 December 2018.
