= Sujit Lenka =

Indian cricketer (born 1992)

Personal information
- Full name: Sujit Skhetra Lenka
- Born: 14 December 1992 (age 33); Bhubaneswar, Odisha, India
- Source: Cricinfo, 20 September 2018

Sujit Lenka (born 14 December 1992) is an Indian cricketer. He made his first-class debut for Odisha in the 2013–14 Ranji Trophy on 14 December 2013.
