= Sumit Kumar (Haryana cricketer) =

Indian cricketer (born 1995)

Personal information
- Born: 12 December 1995 (age 30); Gurgaon, Haryana, India
- Batting: Right-handed
- Bowling: Right arm medium fast
- Source: Cricinfo, 25 September 2019

Sumit Kumar (born 12 December 1995) is an Indian cricketer. He made his List A debut on 4 October 2019, for Haryana in the 2019–20 Vijay Hazare Trophy. He made his first-class debut on 9 December 2019, for Haryana in the 2019–20 Ranji Trophy.
