= Prithvi Singh =

Indian cricketer (born 1993)

Personal information
- Born: 29 September 1993 (age 33); Sundargarh, Rajasthan
- Batting: Left-handed
- Bowling: Slow Left arm orthodox

Domestic team information
- Years: Team
- 2017–18: Railways
- Source: Cricinfo, 13 February 2018

Prithvi Singh (born 29 September 1993) is an Indian cricketer. He made his List A debut for Railways in the 2017–18 Vijay Hazare Trophy on 13 February 2018.
