= Upendra Yadav (cricketer) =

Indian cricketer

Personal information
- Full name: Upendra Diwansingh Yadav
- Born: 8 October 1996 (age 30); Kanpur, Uttar Pradesh, India
- Batting: Right-handed
- Bowling: Right-arm offbreak
- Role: Wicketkeeper Batter

Domestic team information
- Years: Team
- 2014–2020: Uttar Pradesh
- 2022–present: Railways
- FC debut: 29 November 2016 Uttar Pradesh v Railways
- List A debut: 5 February 2018 Uttar Pradesh v Delhi

Career statistics
Competition	FC	LA	T20
Matches	39	30	30
Runs scored	1721	931	646
Batting average	43.0	42.31	26.91
100s/50s	5/7	1/5	0/2
Top score	203*	112	70*
Catches/stumpings	128/18	30/5	19/12
- Source: ESPNcricinfo, 18 April 2023

Upendra Diwansingh Yadav (born 8 October 1996) is an Indian first-class cricketer who plays for Railways.

He made his first-class debut for Uttar Pradesh in the 2016–17 Ranji Trophy on 29 November 2016. He made his List A debut for Uttar Pradesh in the 2017–18 Vijay Hazare Trophy on 5 February 2018. He was bought by Sunrisers Hyderabad for Rs. 25 Lakh, in the 2023 Indian Premier League auction.

== Early and personal life ==
Upendra Yadav is the youngest son of retired sub-inspector of Uttar Pradesh police, Dewan Singh Yadav and grew up in Kanpur, Uttar Pradesh.

As a 12 year old, Upendra Yadav trained for two years at the Kanpur South Ground under S.N.Singh, and at 14, moved to Kamala Cricket Academy to be coached by former Uttar Pradesh captain Sashikant Khandekar.

His elder brother, Varun Yadav, took care of all his training needs and guided him during his formative years. Upendra Yadav says of him: "My brother gave up his dream of becoming a cricketer for me. Right from 6 am till evening, he would stick around me – guiding me and taking care of all things I required to keep myself focused on my game".

Upendra Yadav graduated in Science and works for Indian Railways as junior clerk in the engineering department of North Eastern Railway's Lucknow division.
