= Ankit Kumar =

Indian cricketer (born 1997)

Personal information
- Born: 1 November 1997 (age 29); Shahabad, Haryana, India
- Batting: Right-handed
- Bowling: Right arm off break
- Source: ESPNcricinfo, 14 December 2018

Ankit Kumar (born 1 November 1997) is an Indian cricketer. He plays for Haryana as a top order batter.

He made his first-class debut for Haryana in the 2018–19 Ranji Trophy on 14 December 2018. He made his Twenty20 debut for Haryana in the 2018–19 Syed Mushtaq Ali Trophy on 2 March 2019. He made his List A debut on 4 October 2019, for Haryana in the 2019–20 Vijay Hazare Trophy.
