= Mukhtar Hussain =

Indian cricketer (born 1999)

Personal information
- Full name: Mukhtar Kajir Hussain
- Born: 11 January 1999 (age 27); Dibrugarh, Assam, India
- Batting: Right-handed
- Bowling: Right-arm fast-medium
- Role: Bowler

Domestic team information
- Years: Team
- 2017/18–present: Assam
- Source: ESPNcricinfo, 13 February 2018

Mukhtar Kajir Hussain (born 11 January 1999) is an Indian cricketer. He plays for Assam as a bowler.

He made his List A debut for Assam in the 2017–18 Vijay Hazare Trophy on 13 February 2018. He made his first-class debut for Assam in the 2018–19 Ranji Trophy on 1 November 2018. He was the leading wicket-taker for Assam in the tournament, with 40 dismissals in nine matches. He made his Twenty20 debut for Assam in the 2018–19 Syed Mushtaq Ali Trophy on 21 February 2019.
