= Ajit Chahal =

Indian cricketer (born 1995)

Personal information
- Born: 12 December 1995 (age 30); Rohtak, Haryana, India
- Batting: Right-handed
- Bowling: Right arm medium
- Source: ESPNcricinfo, 24 October 2017

Ajit Chahal (born 12 December 1995) is an Indian cricketer. He made his first-class debut for Haryana in the 2017–18 Ranji Trophy on 24 October 2017. He was the joint-leading wicket-taker for Haryana in the 2017–18 Ranji Trophy, with 19 dismissals in four matches.

He made his Twenty20 debut for Haryana in the 2017–18 Zonal T20 League on 8 January 2018. He made his List A debut for Haryana in the 2017–18 Vijay Hazare Trophy on 7 February 2018.
