= Mahipal Lomror =

Indian cricketer (born 1999)

Personal information
- Full name: Mahipal Krishan Lomror
- Born: 16 November 1999 (age 26); Nagaur, Rajasthan, India
- Batting: Left-handed
- Bowling: Slow left-arm orthodox
- Role: All-rounder

Domestic team information
- Years: Team
- 2016–present: Rajasthan
- 2018–2021: Rajasthan Royals
- 2022–2024: Royal Challengers Bengaluru
- 2025: Gujarat Titans
- 2026: Surrey

Career statistics
Competition	FC	LA	T20
Matches	67	67	117
Runs scored	3,954	2,459	2,407
Batting average	41.18	41.67	27.04
100s/50s	10/18	4/18	0/12
Top score	300*	134*	78*
Balls bowled	4,438	761	522
Wickets	71	11	14
Bowling average	34.61	64.00	47.00
5 wickets in innings	1	0	0
10 wickets in match	0	0	0
Best bowling	5/51	2/15	2/31
Catches/stumpings	31/–	30/–	50/–
- Source: ESPNcricinfo, 27 September 2026

Mahipal Krishan Lomror (born 16 November 1999) is an Indian cricketer who plays for Rajasthan in domestic cricket and Gujarat Titans in Indian Premier League. He is an all-rounder who bats left-handed and bowls slow left-arm orthodox.

== Career ==
Mahipal made his first-class debut for Rajasthan in the 2016–17 Ranji Trophy on 6 October 2016. Prior to his debut, he was named in India's squad for the 2016 Under-19 Cricket World Cup. He made his Twenty20 debut for Rajasthan in the 2016–17 Inter State Twenty-20 Tournament on 30 January 2017. He made his List A debut for Rajasthan in the 2016–17 Vijay Hazare Trophy on 25 February 2017.

He was the joint-leading wicket-taker for Rajasthan in the 2017–18 Ranji Trophy, with 13 dismissals in six matches.

In January 2018, he was bought by the Rajasthan Royals in the 2018 IPL auction. In August 2019, he was named in the India Red team's squad for the 2019–20 Duleep Trophy.

In February 2022, he was bought by the Royal Challengers Bangalore in the auction for the 2022 Indian Premier League tournament.

On 18 August 2026, he signed for Surrey and made his debut against Nottinghamshire in the County Championship.
