= Himanshu Rana =

Indian cricketer (born 1998)

Personal information
- Full name: Himanshu Jaikanwar Rana
- Born: 1 October 1998 (age 28); Sonipat, Haryana, India
- Batting: Right-handed
- Bowling: Right-arm medium

Domestic team information
- Years: Team
- 2014/15–present: Haryana
- Source: ESPNcricinfo

Himanshu Rana (born 1 October 1998) is an Indian cricketer who plays for Haryana in domestic cricket. He is a right-handed batsman and an occasional right-arm medium pace bowler.

Rana made his first-class debut against Delhi in January 2015 at the age of 16, top-scoring for Haryana with 80 in that match. In his third match of the season, he scored his maiden century with 149 against Rajasthan, contributing an innings win to his team. In the first match of the 2015–16 Ranji Trophy against Maharashtra in October 2015, he scored a career-best 157. He made his List A debut for Haryana in the 2016–17 Vijay Hazare Trophy on 25 February 2017.

In December 2017, he was named in India's squad for the 2018 Under-19 Cricket World Cup.

He was the leading run-scorer for Haryana in the 2018–19 Ranji Trophy, accumulating 594 runs in nine matches.
