= Aniket Choudhary =

Indian cricketer (born 1990)

Personal information
- Full name: Aniket Vinod Choudhary
- Born: 28 January 1990 (age 36); Bikaner, Rajasthan, India
- Batting: Right-handed
- Bowling: Left-arm medium
- Role: Bowler

Domestic team information
- Years: Team
- 2011–present: Rajasthan
- 2017: Royal Challengers Bangalore

Career statistics
Competition	FC	LA	T20
Matches	56	7	39
Runs scored	331	55	59
Batting average	6.36	18.33	8.42
100s/50s	0/0	0/0	0/0
Top score	32	31	6*
Balls bowled	9818	316	851
Wickets	187	6	47
Bowling average	24.66	38.50	22.76
5 wickets in innings	12	0	0
10 wickets in match	3	0	0
Best bowling	6/27	2/39	4/30
Catches/stumpings	11/–	0/–	3/–
- Source: ESPNcricinfo, 5 February 2019

Aniket Vinod Choudhary (born 28 January 1990) is an Indian professional cricketer who plays for Rajasthan in domestic cricket. He is a left-arm medium-fast bowler. He was a member of the Kings XI Punjab squad in 2013. In 2013, he played for India A. He made his List A debut on 27 February 2014, for Rajasthan in the 2013–14 Vijay Hazare Trophy.

In February 2017, he was bought by the Royal Challengers Bangalore for the 2017 Indian Premier League for 2 crores. In January 2018, he was bought by the Royal Challengers Bangalore in the 2018 IPL auction. He was the leading wicket-taker for Rajasthan in the group stage of the 2018–19 Ranji Trophy, with 47 dismissals in eight matches.

In August 2019, he was named in the India Blue team's squad for the 2019–20 Duleep Trophy.
