= Shubham Rohilla =

Indian cricketer (born 1998)

Personal information
- Born: 10 March 1998 (age 28); Rohtak, Haryana, India
- Batting: Left-handed
- Bowling: Legbreak googly

Domestic team information
- Years: Team
- 2014-2022: Haryana
- 2022-present: Services
- Source: ESPNcricinfo, 26 November 2022

Shubham Rohilla (born 10 March 1998) is an Indian cricketer. He made his first-class debut for Haryana in the 2014–15 Ranji Trophy on 29 January 2015. He made his Twenty20 debut for Haryana in the 2016–17 Inter State Twenty-20 Tournament on 29 January 2017.

He made his List A debut for Haryana in the 2016–17 Vijay Hazare Trophy on 25 February 2017. Four days later, he scored his maiden List A century in the Vijay Hazare Trophy match against Assam.

He is an opener from Haryana Ranji team.
