= Tapan Sharma =

Indian cricket umpire (born 1975)

Personal information
- Full name: Tapan Sharma
- Born: 24 May 1975 (age 51); Udaipur, Rajasthan, India
- Batting: Right handed

Umpiring information
- WODIs umpired: 4 (2015–2018)
- Source: ESPNcricinfo, 26 September 2021

Tapan Sharma (born 24 May 1975) is an Indian cricket umpire. He has stood in IPL matches and also in Women One Day International (ODI) matches between India and New Zealand as well as in India Vs England. He was reserve Umpire in India Vs Australia Men ODI .He has stood in matches in the Ranji Trophy tournament. He stood as an onfield umpire in the 2021 Indian Premier League, for the first time, in a group match between Chennai Super Kings and Kolkata Knight Riders.
