= Haryana cricket team =

Indian cricket team

Personnel
- Captain: Ankit Kumar
- Coach: Amarjit Kaypee
- Owner: Haryana Cricket Association

Team information
- Home ground: Chaudhary Bansi Lal Cricket Stadium, Rohtak
- Capacity: 8,500

History
- First-class debut: Delhi in 1970 at Sector 16 Stadium, Chandigarh
- Ranji Trophy wins: 1 (1990–91)
- Irani Trophy wins: 1 (1991–92)

The Haryana cricket team is a domestic cricket team run by the Haryana Cricket Association, representing the state of Haryana, India. The team participates in the Ranji Trophy, the top tier domestic first-class cricket tournament in India, as well as the Vijay Hazare Trophy, the top tier domestic List A tournament in India, and the Syed Mushtaq Ali Trophy, a domestic T20 tournament in India. It has won the Ranji Trophy once and finished as runner-up once. It has also won the Irani Cup once. Famous Indian all-rounder Kapil Dev played for Haryana at the domestic level.

== Competition history ==
The Indian state of Haryana was created in 1966. The Haryana cricket team first competed at the first-class level in the 1970–71 Ranji Trophy, captained by Ravinder Chadha, who went on to captain the team for 18 seasons. They won their second match, when Chadha scored their first century and also took nine wickets.

Haryana have appeared in two Ranji Trophy finals. The first time, in 1986 against Delhi, resulted in a heavy defeat. Electing to bat first, the Haryana team (captained by Kapil Dev) were all out for 288. Delhi replied with a mammoth 638, then dismissed Haryana for 209, Maninder Singh taking eight wickets.

Haryana's next final was in 1991 against a very experienced Mumbai team including players like Sachin Tendulkar, Dilip Vengsarkar and Lalchand Rajput. Haryana rode into the finals on the back of the bowling performance of Chetan Sharma and the batting performance of Amarjit Kaypee, (captained by Kapil Dev) won by just two runs in Wankhede Stadium, Mumbai.

This allowed them to make their only appearance in the Irani Trophy, facing a Rest of India side that included Sourav Ganguly, Javagal Srinath, Maninder Singh and Vinod Kambli. Haryana won by four wickets after being set a target of 204 in Nahar Singh Stadium, Faridabad.

As of mid-January 2023, Haryana had played 330 first-class matches, of which they had won 114, lost 87 and drawn 129.

== Honours ==
- Ranji Trophy
  - Winners: 1990–91
  - Runners-up: 1985–86
- Irani Trophy
  - Winners: 1992-93
- Wills Trophy
  - Runners-up (2): 1994–95, 1996–97
- Vijay Hazare Trophy
  - Winners: 2023-24
- Syed Mushtaq Ali Trophy
  - Runners-up: 2025-26

== Famous players ==
Players from Haryana who have played Test cricket for India, along with year of Test debut:

- Kapil Dev (1978)
- Yograj Singh (1981) (also played for Punjab)
- Ashok Malhotra (1982)
- Chetan Sharma (1984)
- Ajay Jadeja (1992)
- Vijay Yadav (1993)
- Ajay Ratra (2002)
- Amit Mishra (2008)
- Jayant Yadav (2016)
- Anshul Kamboj (2025)

Players from Haryana who have played ODI but not Test cricket for India, along with year of ODI debut :

- Joginder Sharma (2004)
- Mohit Sharma (2013)
- Yuzvendra Chahal (2016)

Players from Haryana who have played T20I but not Test or ODI cricket for India, along with year of T20I debut :

- Harshal Patel (2021)

Notable players at the domestic level:

- Amarjit Kaypee
- Rajinder Goel

== Current squad ==
●Head coach – Amarjit Kaypee

Players with international caps are listed in bold.

Name	Birth date	Batting style	Bowling style	Notes
Batters
Ankit Kumar	1 November 1997 (age 29)	Right-handed	Right-arm off break	**Captain**
Mayank Shandilya	25 March 2004 (age 22)	Right-handed	Right-arm off break	
Dheeru Singh	3 March 1998 (age 28)	Right-handed	Right-arm leg break	
Himanshu Rana	1 October 1998 (age 28)	Right-handed	Right-arm medium	
Arsh Ranga	13 November 2004 (age 22)	Left-handed		
Kunal Singh		Right-handed		
All-rounders
Parth Vats	22 January 2004 (age 22)	Left-handed	Slow left-arm orthodox	
Nishant Sindhu	9 April 2004 (age 22)	Left-handed	Slow left-arm orthodox	Plays for **Gujarat Titans** in IPL
Samant Jakhar	28 January 2004 (age 22)	Right-handed	Right-arm medium	
Rahul Tewatia	20 May 1993 (age 33)	Left-handed	Right-arm leg break	Plays for **Gujarat Titans** in IPL
Wicket-keepers
Yashvardhan Dalal		Right-handed		
Dinesh Bana	15 December 2004 (age 21)	Right-handed		
Spin Bowlers
Amit Rana	14 December 1995 (age 30)	Right-handed	Right-arm off break	
**Yuzvendra Chahal**	23 July 1990 (age 36)	Right-handed	Right-arm leg break	Plays for **Punjab Kings** in IPL
Kanishk Chouhan	26 September 2006 (age 20)	Right-handed	Right-arm off break	Plays for **Royal Challengers Bengaluru** in IPL
Tanmay Baloda	9 August 2008 (age 18)	Right-handed	Slow left-arm orthodox	
Pace Bowlers
**Anshul Kamboj**	6 December 2000 (age 25)	Right-handed	Right-arm medium	Plays for **Chennai Super Kings** in IPL
Sumit Kumar	12 December 1995 (age 30)	Right-handed	Right-arm medium	
Anuj Thakral	15 October 2002 (age 24)	Right-handed	Right-arm medium-fast	
Aman Kumar	18 December 1999 (age 26)	Right-handed	Right-arm fast	
Ajay Singh	8 October 2004 (age 22)	Right-handed	Right-arm medium	
Vaibhav Arora	14 December 1997 (age 28)	Right-handed	Right-arm fast-medium	Plays for **Kolkata Knight Riders** in IPL
Ajit Chahal	12 December 1995 (age 30)	Right-handed	Right-arm medium	
Himanshu Kumar	21 March 2006 (age 20)	Right-handed	Right-arm medium	

Updated as on 14 November 2026

== See also ==
- Dominence of Haryana in sports
