= 2018–19 Ranji Trophy =

Cricket tournament

- The Ranji Trophy, awarded to the winners
- Dates: 1 November 2018 – 7 February 2019
- Administrator: BCCI
- Cricket format: First-class cricket
- Tournament format: Round-robin then knockout
- Host: India
- Champions: Vidarbha (2nd title)
- Participants: 37
- Matches: 151
- Most runs: Milind Kumar (1,331) (Sikkim)
- Most wickets: Ashutosh Aman (68) (Bihar)

The 2018–19 Ranji Trophy was the 85th season of the Ranji Trophy, the premier first-class cricket tournament that took place in India between November 2018 and February 2019. Vidarbha were the defending champions. The final took place between Vidarbha and Saurashtra, starting on 3 February 2019. Vidarbha defeated Saurashtra by 78 runs in the final, to become the sixth team in the tournament's history to retain their title.

== Background ==
In April 2018, the Board of Control for Cricket in India (BCCI) reinstated Bihar for the competition, bringing the total teams to 29. In July 2018, the BCCI increased the total number of teams to 37, with the addition of Arunachal Pradesh, Manipur, Meghalaya, Mizoram, Nagaland, Pondicherry, Sikkim and Uttarakhand.

== Format ==
The tournament had four groups, with nine teams each in Groups A and B, and ten teams in Group C. All the new teams were placed in the Plate Group. The teams in the Plate Group were allowed to have up to three professional players in their squads. The top two teams from Group C and the top team in the Plate Group progressed to the quarter-finals of the tournament, along with five teams from Groups A and B.

== Summary ==
=== League phase ===
The opening round of fixtures saw a total of 94 players making their first-class cricket debut.

In the third round match between Vidarbha and Baroda, Vidarbha's Wasim Jaffer became the first batsman to score 11,000 runs in the Ranji Trophy. In the fourth round match between Pondicherry and Mizoram, Pondicherry's Pankaj Singh set a new record for the most five-wicket hauls against different teams in the Ranji Trophy with 17. The fourth round of fixtures also saw the first occasion that seven captains scored centuries.

In round five, Paras Dogra batting for Pondicherry scored 253 runs against Sikkim. It was his eighth double century, going past Ajay Sharma's record of seven double centuries in the Ranji Trophy. Also in round five, Ajay Rohera set a new record for the highest score on debut in a first-class match. Batting for Madhya Pradesh against Hyderabad, he scored 267 not out, breaking the record of 260 runs set by Amol Mazumdar in 1994. Naman Ojha became the most successful wicket-keeper in Ranji Trophy history, breaking Vinayak Samant's record of 355 dismissals as wicket-keeper.

In the sixth round of fixtures, Milind Kumar of Sikkim became the first batsman to score 1,000 runs in this edition of the tournament. He did so in the match against Mizoram, in his ninth innings of the competition. In round seven of the tournament, Ashutosh Aman of Bihar became the first bowler to take 50 wickets in this years' Ranji Trophy tournament. He went on to finish the tournament with 68 wickets, breaking the previous record of 64 dismissals set by Bishan Singh Bedi in the 1974–75 tournament. Round eight saw Pankaj Singh of Pondicherry become the first seam bowler to take 400 wickets in the Ranji Trophy. In round nine, Tripura and Madhya Pradesh were both dismissed for just 35 runs in one of their innings.

The group stage of the tournament saw two captains retire from all forms of cricket. In November 2018, Gautam Gambhir initially stepped down as captain of Delhi, before announcing his retirement the following month. Gambhir went on to score 112 in his final innings, his 43rd century in first-class cricket. Saurashtra's captain, Jaydev Shah, also retired from cricket in December. He made record for most matches as captain in Ranji Trophy.

The ninth round match between Vidarbha and Saurashtra was Wasim Jaffer's 146th match in the Ranji Trophy. He broke Devendra Bundela's record of playing in the most Ranji matches.

On 2 January 2019, Rajasthan from Group C became the first team to qualify for the quarter-finals, after they beat Goa by ten wickets. Ahead of the penultimate round of fixtures, ten teams across Groups A and B still had a chance to progress to the quarter-finals. Vidarbha became the first team to qualify from Group A, after Baroda beat Karnataka by two wickets in their final group-stage match. Despite the loss, Karnataka also qualified from Group A. Uttarakhand won the Plate Group and advanced to the quarter-finals. On the final day of the group stage, Saurashtra and Gujarat from Group A, Kerala from Group B and Uttar Pradesh from Group C had also qualified for the quarter-finals.

Chhattisgarh and Maharashtra across Groups A and B were relegated to Group C, while Goa were relegated from Group C to the Plate Group for the next season.

=== Knockout phase ===
Kerala were the first team to progress from the quarter-finals, after they beat Gujarat by 113 runs. It was the first time in the team's history that they had reached the semi-finals of the Ranji Trophy, beating their previous best of the quarter-finals, in the previous edition. The second team to qualify for the semi-finals was Karnataka, after they beat Rajasthan by six wickets. Defending champions Vidarbha beat Uttarakhand from the Plate Group by an innings and 115 runs to reach the semi-finals. In the last quarter-final fixture to finish, Saurashtra completed the highest successful run chase to win a match in the Ranji Trophy, scoring 372 runs to beat Uttar Pradesh by six wickets.

The first semi-final saw the defending champions Vidarbha beat Kerala by an innings and 11 runs inside two days. Wasim Jaffer became the first batsman to score 1,000 runs in two different seasons of the Ranji Trophy. Umesh Yadav took his best match figures in first-class cricket, taking twelve wickets for 79 runs. In the second semi-final, Saurashtra defeated Karnataka by five wickets.

Vidarbha defeated Saurashtra by 78 runs in the final, to become the sixth team in the tournament's history to retain their title. Vidarbha's captain Faiz Fazal said that "it is not easy to win the Ranji Trophy. To win eleven matches, it's not a fluke. If anyone thought last year was a fluke, we have proven ourselves again". For Saurashtra, it was their third straight loss in Ranji Trophy finals, with their captain Jaydev Unadkat saying he was really proud of how his team performed during the tournament.

== Player transfers ==
The following player transfers were approved ahead of the season. All the new teams in the Plate Group also transferred players into their squads, along with signing professionals.

Player	From	To
Karn Sharma	Vidarbha	Andhra
Harpreet Singh Bhatia	Madhya Pradesh	Chhattisgarh
Krishna Das	Assam	Goa
Amit Verma	Assam	Goa
Urvil Patel	Baroda	Gujarat
Irfan Pathan	Baroda	Jammu & Kashmir
Chandrakant Sakure	Madhya Pradesh	Railways
Madhur Khatri	Rajasthan	Railways
Rajat Paliwal	Haryana	Services
Arjun Sharma	Himachal Pradesh	Services
Abhishek Tiwari	Uttar Pradesh	Services
Harmeet Singh Baddhan	Jammu & Kashmir	Tripura
Bravish Shetty	Mumbai	Tripura

== Teams ==
The teams were drawn in the following groups:

Group A

- Baroda
- Chhattisgarh
- Gujarat
- Karnataka
- Maharashtra
- Mumbai
- Railways
- Saurashtra
- Vidarbha

Group B

- Andhra
- Bengal
- Delhi
- Himachal Pradesh
- Hyderabad
- Kerala
- Madhya Pradesh
- Punjab
- Tamil Nadu

Group C

- Assam
- Goa
- Haryana
- Jammu & Kashmir
- Jharkhand
- Odisha
- Rajasthan
- Services
- Tripura
- Uttar Pradesh

Plate Group

- Arunachal Pradesh
- Bihar
- Manipur
- Meghalaya
- Mizoram
- Nagaland
- Pondicherry
- Sikkim
- Uttarakhand

== League stage ==
=== Group A ===
Pos	Team	Pld	W	L	D	T	NR	Pts	Quot
1	Vidarbha	8	3	0	5	0	0	29	1.332
2	Saurashtra	8	3	0	5	0	0	29	1.108
3	Karnataka	8	3	2	3	0	0	27	1.316
5	Gujarat	8	3	0	5	0	0	26	1.288
6	Baroda	8	3	1	4	0	0	26	1.057
11	Mumbai	8	1	2	5	0	0	17	0.924
15	Railways	8	1	4	3	0	0	14	0.868
17	Maharashtra	8	0	4	4	0	0	8	0.700
18	Chhattisgarh	8	0	4	4	0	0	6	0.635

- Top five teams across Groups A and B advanced to the knockout stage.
- Bottom two teams across Groups A and B relegated to the Elite Group C for the 2019-20 Ranji Trophy.

=== Group B ===
Pos	Team	Pld	W	L	D	T	NR	Pts	Quot
4	Kerala	8	4	3	1	0	0	26	1.156
7	Madhya Pradesh	8	3	2	3	0	0	24	1.144
8	Bengal	8	2	1	5	0	0	23	1.076
9	Punjab	8	2	1	5	0	0	23	1.017
10	Himachal Pradesh	8	3	3	2	0	0	22	1.042
12	Andhra	8	1	2	5	0	0	17	0.900
13	Hyderabad	8	1	1	6	0	0	17	0.840
14	Tamil Nadu	8	1	2	5	0	0	15	1.016
16	Delhi	8	1	3	4	0	0	14	0.822

- Top five teams across Groups A and B advanced to the knockout stage.
- Bottom two teams across Groups A and B relegated to the Elite Group C for the next season.

=== Group C ===
Team	Pld	W	L	D	T	NR	Pts	Quot
Rajasthan	9	7	0	2	0	0	51	1.539
Uttar Pradesh	9	5	0	4	0	0	41	1.964
Jharkhand	9	5	1	3	0	0	40	1.266
Odisha	9	4	3	2	0	0	26	1.101
Haryana	9	3	4	2	0	0	22	0.844
Assam	9	3	4	2	0	0	21	0.847
Jammu & Kashmir	9	3	5	1	0	0	19	0.826
Services	9	2	3	4	0	0	19	0.936
Tripura	9	1	6	2	0	0	11	0.734
Goa	9	0	7	2	0	0	6	0.639

- Top two teams advanced to the knockout stage and are promoted to the Elite Groups A and B for the next season.
- Bottom ranked team is relegated to the Plate Group for the next season.

=== Plate Group ===
Team	Pld	W	L	D	T	NR	Pts	Quot
Uttarakhand	8	6	0	2	0	0	44	2.435
Bihar	8	6	1	0	0	1	40	2.307
Pondicherry	8	4	0	3	0	1	33	1.859
Meghalaya	8	4	2	2	0	0	29	1.349
Sikkim	8	4	3	1	0	0	20	0.757
Manipur	8	3	5	0	0	0	18	0.845
Nagaland	8	2	4	2	0	0	18	1.039
Arunachal Pradesh	8	0	7	1	0	0	3	0.436
Mizoram	8	0	7	1	0	0	1	0.385

- Top team advanced to the knockout stage and gets promoted to Elite Group C for the next season.

== Knockout stage ==
Quarterfinals
A1	Vidarbha	629
P1	Uttarakhand	355 & 159
B1	Kerala	185 & 171
A4	Gujarat	162 & 81
A2	Saurashtra	208 & 372/4
C2	Uttar Pradesh	385 & 194
A3	Karnataka	263 & 185/4
C1	Rajasthan	224 & 222

Semifinals
A1	Vidarbha	208
B1	Kerala	106 & 91
A2	Saurashtra	236 & 282/5
A3	Karnataka	275 & 239

Final
A1	Vidarbha	312 & 200
A2	Saurashtra	307 & 127

=== Quarter-finals ===
15–19 January 2019
1st Quarter-final
Scorecard

Uttarakhand	v	Vidarbha
355 (108.4 overs); Saurabh Rawat 108 (162); Umesh Yadav 4/90 (31.4 overs)		629 (184 overs); Wasim Jaffer 206 (296); Dhanraj Sharma 3/101 (29 overs)
159 (65.1 overs); Karn Kaushal 76 (137); Umesh Yadav 5/23 (15 overs)

Vidarbha won by an innings and 115 runs
Vidarbha Cricket Association Stadium, Nagpur
Umpires: Amiesh Saheba and Sudhir Asnani
Player of the match: Umesh Yadav (Vidarbha)

- Vidarbha won the toss and elected to field.
- Avneesh Sudha (Uttarakhand) made his first-class debut.
- Wasim Jaffer (Vidarbha) scored his 19,000th run in first-class cricket.

15–19 January 2019
2nd Quarter-final
Scorecard

Uttar Pradesh	v	Saurashtra
385 (103.3 overs); Rinku Singh 150 (181); Jaydev Unadkat 5/86 (22.3 overs)		208 (66.4 overs); Harvik Desai 84 (143); Yash Dayal 4/55 (17.3 overs)
194 (72.1 overs); Mohammad Saif 48 (80); Dharmendrasinh Jadeja 4/53 (19 overs)		372/4 (115.1 overs); Harvik Desai 116 (259); Akshdeep Nath 1/17 (5 overs)

Saurashtra won by 6 wickets
Bharat Ratna Shri Atal Bihari Vajpayee Ekana Cricket Stadium, Lucknow
Umpires: Abhijit Deshmukh and Rohan Pandit
Player of the match: Harvik Desai (Saurashtra)

- Uttar Pradesh won the toss and elected to bat.
- Rahul Rawat (Uttar Pradesh) made his first-class debut.
- Harvik Desai (Saurashtra) scored his maiden first-class century.
- This was the highest successful run chase to win a match in the Ranji Trophy.

15–19 January 2019
3rd Quarter-final
Scorecard

Rajasthan	v	Karnataka
224 (77.1 overs); Rajesh Bishnoi 79 (119); Abhimanyu Mithun 3/48 (17.1 overs)		263 (87.4 overs); Vinay Kumar 83* (144); Rahul Chahar 5/93 (26.1 overs)
222 (67.2 overs); Robin Bist 44 (73); Krishnappa Gowtham 4/54 (19 overs)		185/4 (47.5 overs); Manish Pandey 87* (75); Aniket Choudhary 2/32 (13 overs)

Karnataka won by 6 wickets
M. Chinnaswamy Stadium, Bangalore
Umpires: Nikhil Patwardhan and Nand Kishore
Player of the match: Vinay Kumar (Karnataka)

- Karnataka won the toss and elected to field.
- Tanveer Ul-Haq became the first bowler for Rajasthan to take 50 wickets in a single edition of the Ranji Trophy.

15–19 January 2019
4th Quarter-final
Scorecard

Kerala	v	Gujarat
185 (39.3 overs); Basil Thampi 37 (33); Chintan Gaja 4/57 (14.3 overs)		162 (51.4 overs); Parthiv Patel 43 (36); Sandeep Warrier 4/42 (23 overs)
171 (59 overs); Sijomon Joseph 56 (148); Roosh Kalaria 3/36 (17 overs)		81 (31.3 overs); Rahul Shah 33* (70); Basil Thampi 5/27 (12 overs)

Kerala won by 113 runs
Krishnagiri Stadium, Wayanad
Umpires: Krishnaraj Srinath and Tapan Sharma
Player of the match: Basil Thampi (Kerala)

- Gujarat won the toss and elected to field.
- Rahul Shah (Gujarat) made his first-class debut.
- Roosh Kalaria (Gujarat) took a hat-trick.
- This was the first time that Kerala had progressed to the semi-finals of the Ranji Trophy.

=== Semi-finals ===
24–28 January 2019
1st Semi-final
Scorecard

Kerala	v	Vidarbha
106 (28.4 overs); Vishnu Vinod 37* (50); Umesh Yadav 7/48 (12 overs)		208 (52.4 overs); Faiz Fazal 75 (142); Sandeep Warrier 5/57 (16.4 overs)
91 (24.5 overs); Arun Karthik 36 (33); Umesh Yadav 5/31 (10.5 overs)

Vidarbha won by an innings and 11 runs
Krishnagiri Stadium, Wayanad
Umpires: Anil Dandekar and Virender Sharma
Player of the match: Umesh Yadav (Vidarbha)

- Vidarbha won the toss and elected to field.

24–28 January 2019
2nd Semi-final
Scorecard

Karnataka	v	Saurashtra
275 (100.3 overs); Shreyas Gopal 87 (182); Jaydev Unadkat 4/56 (21 overs)		236 (71 overs); Snell Patel 85 (131); Ronit More 6/60 (18 overs)
239 (80 overs); Shreyas Gopal 61 (138); Dharmendrasinh Jadeja 5/78 (28 overs)		282/5 (91.4 overs); Cheteshwar Pujara 131* (266); Vinay Kumar 3/75 (25 overs)

Saurashtra won by 5 wickets
M. Chinnaswamy Stadium, Bangalore
Umpires: Ulhas Gandhe and Saiyed Khalid
Player of the match: Cheteshwar Pujara (Saurashtra)

- Karnataka won the toss and elected to bat.
- Jaydev Unadkat became the second bowler for Saurashtra, after Kamlesh Makvana, to take 200 wickets in the Ranji Trophy.
- Dharmendrasinh Jadeja became the first bowler for Saurashtra to take 50 wickets in a Ranji Trophy season.

=== Final ===
3–7 February 2019
Final
Scorecard

Vidarbha	v	Saurashtra
312 (120.2 overs); Akshay Karnewar 73* (160); Jaydev Unadkat 3/54 (24 overs)		307 (117 overs); Snell Patel 102 (209); Aditya Sarwate 5/98 (40 overs)
200 (92.5 overs); Aditya Sarwate 49 (133); Dharmendrasinh Jadeja 6/96 (36.5 overs)		127 (58.4 overs); Vishvaraj Jadeja 52 (137); Aditya Sarwate 6/59 (24 overs)

Vidarbha won by 78 runs
Vidarbha Cricket Association Stadium, Nagpur
Umpires: Chettithody Shamshuddin and Anil Chaudhary
Player of the match: Aditya Sarwate (Vidarbha)

- Vidarbha won the toss and elected to bat.
- Wasim Jaffer (Vidarbha) played in his tenth Ranji Trophy final, and has been on the winning side every time.
