= 2021–22 Hyderabad C.A. season =

Hyderabad C.A.
2021–22 season
- Coach: Milap Mewada
- Captain: Tanmay Agarwal
- Ground(s): Rajiv Gandhi International Cricket Stadium
- Syed Mushtaq Ali Trophy: Semi-finals
- Vijay Hazare Trophy: 4th Group C
- Ranji Trophy: 2nd Group B
- Most runs: FC: Tilak Varma (216); LA: Tilak Varma (180); T20: Tanmay Agarwal (334)
- Most wickets: FC: Ravi Teja (20); LA: Chama Milind (8); T20: Chama Milind (18)

The 2021–22 season is Hyderabad cricket team's 88th competitive season. The Hyderabad cricket team is senior men's domestic cricket team based in the city of Hyderabad, India, run by the Hyderabad Cricket Association (HCA). They represent the state of Telangana in domestic competitions.

== Squad ==
=== Arrivals ===
Hanuma Vihari returned to the Hyderabad squad for the first time since his departure to Andhra in 2015.

=== Departures ===
Yudhvir Singh migrated to his home state, Jammu and Kashmir.

=== Players ===
The following players made at least one appearance for Hyderabad in first-class, List A or Twenty20 cricket in 2021–22 season. Age given is at the start of Hyderabad's first match of the season (4 November 2021).
Players with international caps are listed in bold.

Name	Birth date	Batting style	Bowling style	Notes
Batsmen
Alankrit Agarwal	21 October 1999 (aged 22)	Right-handed	Right-arm off-break	**First Class** debut against Baroda (3 March 2022)
Himalay Agarwal	9 October 1993 (aged 28)	Right-handed	Right-arm medium-fast	
Tanmay Agarwal	3 May 1995 (aged 26)	Left-handed	Right-arm leg break	**Captain**
Jaweed Ali	15 December 1993 (aged 27)	Right-handed	Right-arm off break	
Rahul Buddhi	20 September 1997 (aged 24)	Left-handed	Right-arm off break	**List A** debut against Haryana (8 December 2021); Played for **Mumbai Indians** in 2022 Indian Premier League
Rohit Rayudu	29 July 1994 (aged 27)	Left-handed	Right-arm off break	
Abhirath Reddy	29 September 1996 (aged 25)	Right-handed	Right-arm leg break	**List A** debut against Saurashtra (11 December 2021)
Akshath Reddy	11 February 1991 (aged 30)	Right-handed	Right-arm leg break	
Chaitanya Reddy	15 October 1995 (aged 26)	Left-handed	Right-arm off break	
P Nitesh Reddy	28 November 2000 (aged 20)	Right-handed	Right-arm off-break	
HK Simha	27 March 1998 (aged 23)	Right-handed	Right-arm off break	
Surya Teja		Right-handed	Right-arm medium fast	
Tilak Varma	8 November 2002 (aged 18)	Left-handed	Right-arm off break	Played for **Mumbai Indians** in 2022 Indian Premier League
**Hanuma Vihari**	13 October 1993 (aged 28)	Right-handed	Right-arm off break	
Aliga Vinay	24 November 1999 (aged 21)	Right-handed	Right-arm medium fast	
All-rounders
Mohammed Afreedi	18 October 1998 (aged 23)	Right-handed	Right-arm medium-fast	
Mickil Jaiswal	10 May 1998 (aged 23)	Right-handed	Right-arm leg break	**First Class** debut against Chandigarh (17 February 2022)
Chandan Sahani	29 January 1998 (aged 23)	Right-handed	Right-arm medium	**List A** debut against Haryana (8 December 2021); **First Class** debut against Baroda (3 March 2022)
Bavanaka Sandeep	25 April 1992 (aged 29)	Left-handed	Slow left-arm orthodox	
Rathan Teja	23 December 1999 (aged 21)	Right-handed	Right-arm leg-break	
Ravi Teja	19 October 1994 (aged 27)	Left-handed	Right-arm medium-fast	
Tanay Thyagarajan	15 November 1995 (aged 25)	Left-handed	Slow left-arm orthodox	
Wicket-keepers
Dheeraj Goud	24 December 2004 (aged 16)	Right-handed	—	
Pragnay Reddy	18 December 1999 (aged 21)	Right-handed	—	
Prateek Reddy	28 November 2000 (aged 20)	Right-handed	—	
Kolla Sumanth	24 April 1992 (aged 29)	Right-handed	—	
Bowlers
Ajay Dev Goud	15 February 2000 (aged 21)	Right-handed	Right-arm medium-fast	
Trishank Gupta	24 September 2001 (aged 20)	Right-handed	Right-arm leg-break	**Twenty20** debut against Uttar Pradesh (9 November 2021); **List A** debut against Haryana (8 December 2021)
Mehdi Hasan	3 February 1990 (aged 31)	Left-handed	Slow left-arm orthodox	
Kartikeya Kak	4 October 1996 (aged 25)	Right-handed	Right-arm medium-fast	**List A** debut against Delhi (9 December 2021)
Chama Milind	4 September 1994 (aged 27)	Left-handed	Left-arm medium-fast	Played for **Royal Challengers Bangalore** in 2022 Indian Premier League
Abrar Mohiuddin	19 February 1995 (aged 26)	Right-handed	Right-arm fast	
Surya Prasad	27 August 1991 (aged 30)	Right-handed	Right-arm medium-fast	**First Class** debut against Baroda (3 March 2022)
B Punnaiah	12 May 2003 (aged 18)	Right-handed	Right-arm medium-fast	**First Class** debut against Bengal (24 February 2022)
Abdul Ela Al Quraishi	2 December 1997 (aged 23)	Left-handed	Right-arm off break	**Twenty20** debut against Delhi (8 November 2021)
Rakshann Readdi	29 September 2000 (aged 21)	Right-handed	Right-arm medium-fast	**First Class** debut against Chandigarh (17 February 2022)
Elligaram Sanketh	8 October 1999 (aged 22)	Left-handed	Left-arm medium-fast	**Twenty20** debut against Uttar Pradesh (9 November 2021)
Md Saqlain		Right-handed	Right-arm off-break	
**Mohammed Siraj**	13 March 1994 (aged 27)	Right-handed	Right-arm medium-fast	Played for **Royal Challengers Bangalore** in 2022 Indian Premier League
Bhagath Varma	21 September 1998 (aged 23)	Right-handed	Right-arm off break	Played for **Chennai Super Kings** in 2022 Indian Premier League
Atul Vyas	3 October 1997 (aged 24)	Right-handed	Right-arm medium-fast	**List A** debut against Jharkhand (14 December 2021)

== Competitions ==
=== Overview ===
Competition	Format	Pld	W	L	D / T / NR	Win %	Final position
Syed Mushtaq Ali Trophy	Twenty20 cricket	7	6	1	0	85.71%	Semi-finals
Vijay Hazare Trophy	List A cricket	5	2	3	0	40%	Group stage
Ranji Trophy	First-class cricket	3	2	1	0	66.67%	Group stage

=== Syed Mushtaq Ali Trophy ===
The Syed Mushtaq Ali Trophy, a Twenty20 cricket tournament in India, fixtures were announced by the Board of Control for Cricket in India (BCCI) on 30 August 2021 and the Hyderabad was placed in the Group E with all the group fixtures to be played in a bio-secure hub in Haryana. On 23 October, the Hyderabad announced two teams for the tournament with one team being selected by the Syed Quadri's panel supported by the HCA president group while the other by Noel David's committee supported by the secretary group. The feud between the two on various issues including the team selection continued until the Supreme Court intervened to resolve the issue. The final team was confirmed on 30 October with Tanmay Agarwal as captain and Milap Mewada as coach.

The Hyderabad started their campaign on 4 November with a win against the Saurashtra. They topped their group winning all their five group matches with Agarwal and Chama Milind as leading run-getter and wicket-taker of the tournament during the group stages respectively. The Hyderabad defeated the Gujarat by 30 runs in the quarterfinal but lost to the Tamil Nadu in the semifinal.

==== Points table ====
Pos	Team	Pld	W	L	NR	Pts	NRR
1	Hyderabad	5	5	0	0	20	1.114
2	Saurashtra	5	4	1	0	16	0.511
3	Delhi	5	3	2	0	12	0.982
4	Uttar Pradesh	5	2	3	0	8	−0.399
5	Chandigarh	5	1	4	0	4	−0.973
6	Uttarakhand	5	0	5	0	0	−1.244

Source: ESPN Cricinfo

Advanced to Quarter-final
Advanced to Preliminary quarter-final

==== Knockout stage ====
Preliminary QF
C2	Himachal Pradesh	145/6
D2	Kerala	147/2
A2	Maharashtra	157/8
P1	Vidarbha	160/3
B2	Karnataka	150/8
E2	Saurashtra	145/7

Quarter-finals
A1	Tamil Nadu	187/5
D2	Kerala	181/4
D1	Gujarat	128/8
E1	Hyderabad	158/5
C1	Rajasthan	84/8
P1	Vidarbha	87/1
B1	Bengal	160/8
B2	Karnataka	160/5

Semi-finals
A1	Tamil Nadu	92/2
E1	Hyderabad	90
B2	Karnataka	176/7
P1	Vidarbha	172/6

Final
A1	Tamil Nadu	153/6
B2	Karnataka	151/7

==== Matches ====
Group stage

4 November 2021	Saurashtra; 173/8 (20 overs)	v	Hyderabad; 177/8 (19.3 overs)	Hyderabad won by 2 wickets
09:00 Round 1 Scorecard	Saurashtra; 173/8 (20 overs)	v	Hyderabad; 177/8 (19.3 overs)	Gurgaon Cricket Ground, Sultanpur; Umpires: Krishnaraj Srinath and Pashchim Pathak
09:00 Round 1 Scorecard	Prerak Mankad 71 (46); Mohammad Siraj 3/38 (4 overs)		Tanmay Agarwal 55 (35); Chetan Sakariya 3/31 (4 overs)	Gurgaon Cricket Ground, Sultanpur; Umpires: Krishnaraj Srinath and Pashchim Pathak
Hyderabad won the toss and elected to field.; Jay Gohil and Parth Bhut (Saurashtra) both made their T20 debuts.				Gurgaon Cricket Ground, Sultanpur; Umpires: Krishnaraj Srinath and Pashchim Pathak

5 November 2021	Hyderabad; 167/5 (20 overs)	v	Uttarakhand; 106 (18.3 overs)	Hyderabad won by 61 runs
13:30 Round 2 Scorecard	Hyderabad; 167/5 (20 overs)	v	Uttarakhand; 106 (18.3 overs)	Gurgaon Cricket Ground, Sultanpur; Umpires: Abhijit Deshmukh and Akshay Totre
13:30 Round 2 Scorecard	Tanmay Agarwal 97* (59); Dikshanshu Negi 2/18 (4 overs)		Dikshanshu Negi 18 (12); Chama Milind 5/16 (3.3 overs)	Gurgaon Cricket Ground, Sultanpur; Umpires: Abhijit Deshmukh and Akshay Totre
Hyderabad won the toss and elected to bat.; Md Nazim (Uttarakhand) made his T20 debut.				Gurgaon Cricket Ground, Sultanpur; Umpires: Abhijit Deshmukh and Akshay Totre

6 November 2021	Chandigarh; 162/5 (20 overs)	v	Hyderabad; 163/2 (18.4 overs)	Hyderabad won by 8 wickets
09:00 Round 3 Scorecard	Chandigarh; 162/5 (20 overs)	v	Hyderabad; 163/2 (18.4 overs)	Gurgaon Cricket Ground, Sultanpur; Umpires: Navdeep Singh and Rohan Pandit
09:00 Round 3 Scorecard	Manan Vohra 106* (64); Ravi Teja 2/19 (4 overs)		Tilak Varma 61* (29); Arpit Pannu 1/17 (4 overs)	Gurgaon Cricket Ground, Sultanpur; Umpires: Navdeep Singh and Rohan Pandit
Hyderabad won the toss and elected to field.; Arpit Pannu (Chandigarh) made his T20 debut.				Gurgaon Cricket Ground, Sultanpur; Umpires: Navdeep Singh and Rohan Pandit

8 November 2021	Delhi; 170/5 (20 overs)	v	Hyderabad; 171/7 (20 overs)	Hyderabad won by 3 wickets
09:00 Round 4 Scorecard	Delhi; 170/5 (20 overs)	v	Hyderabad; 171/7 (20 overs)	Gurgaon Cricket Ground, Sultanpur; Umpires: Krishnaraj Srinath and Pashchim Pathak
09:00 Round 4 Scorecard	Anuj Rawat 41 (33); Chama Milind 2/49 (4 overs)		Tanmay Agarwal 54 (34); Pradeep Sangwan 3/27 (4 overs)	Gurgaon Cricket Ground, Sultanpur; Umpires: Krishnaraj Srinath and Pashchim Pathak
Hyderabad won the toss and elected to field.; Abdul Ela Al Quraishi (Hyderabad) made his T20 debut.				Gurgaon Cricket Ground, Sultanpur; Umpires: Krishnaraj Srinath and Pashchim Pathak

9 November 2021	Hyderabad; 147/7 (20 overs)	v	Uttar Pradesh; 118 (19.2 overs)	Hyderabad won by 29 runs
13:30 Round 5 Scorecard	Hyderabad; 147/7 (20 overs)	v	Uttar Pradesh; 118 (19.2 overs)	Gurgaon Cricket Ground, Sultanpur; Umpires: Navdeep Singh and Rohan Pandit
13:30 Round 5 Scorecard	Tanmay Agarwal 62 (46); Yash Dayal 2/20 (4 overs)		Akshdeep Nath 36 (32); Chama Milind 5/8 (3.2 overs)	Gurgaon Cricket Ground, Sultanpur; Umpires: Navdeep Singh and Rohan Pandit
Hyderabad won the toss and elected to bat.; Elligaram Sanketh, Trishank Gupta (Hyderabad) and Manik Beri (Uttar Pradesh) all made their T20 debuts.				Gurgaon Cricket Ground, Sultanpur; Umpires: Navdeep Singh and Rohan Pandit

Quarter-final

18 November 2021	Hyderabad; 158/5 (20 overs)	v	Gujarat; 128/8 (20 overs)	Hyderabad won by 30 runs
13:00 Quarterfinal 4 Scorecard	Hyderabad; 158/5 (20 overs)	v	Gujarat; 128/8 (20 overs)	Palam A Stadium, Delhi; Umpires: Chirra Ravikanthreddy and Yeshwant Barde
13:00 Quarterfinal 4 Scorecard	Tilak Varma 75 (50); Piyush Chawla 2/9 (4 overs)		Ripal Patel 35 (24); Ravi Teja 3/27 (4 overs)	Palam A Stadium, Delhi; Umpires: Chirra Ravikanthreddy and Yeshwant Barde
Gujarat won the toss and elected to field.				Palam A Stadium, Delhi; Umpires: Chirra Ravikanthreddy and Yeshwant Barde

Semi-final

20 November 2021	Hyderabad; 90 (18.3 overs)	v	Tamil Nadu; 92/2 (14.2 overs)	Tamil Nadu won by 8 wickets
08:30 Semifinal 1 Scorecard	Hyderabad; 90 (18.3 overs)	v	Tamil Nadu; 92/2 (14.2 overs)	Arun Jaitley Stadium, Delhi; Umpires: Pashchim Pathak and Ulhas Gandhe
08:30 Semifinal 1 Scorecard	Tanay Thyagarajan 25 (24); Saravana Kumar 5/21 (3.3 overs)		Vijay Shankar 43 (40); Rakshann Readdi 2/23 (3.2 overs)	Arun Jaitley Stadium, Delhi; Umpires: Pashchim Pathak and Ulhas Gandhe
Tamil Nadu won the toss and elected to field.				Arun Jaitley Stadium, Delhi; Umpires: Pashchim Pathak and Ulhas Gandhe

=== Vijay Hazare Trophy ===
The Vijay Hazare Trophy, a List A cricket tournament in India, fixtures were announced by the Board of Control for Cricket in India (BCCI) on 30 August 2021 and the Hyderabad was placed in the Group C with all the group fixtures to be played in Chandigarh. The Hyderabad announced their squad on 2 December 2021.

The Hyderabad started their campaign with the wins against Haryana and Delhi in their first two group matches. They failed to qualify for the knockout stage after losing their last three group matches thereby finishing fourth in the group stage.

==== Points table ====
Pos	Team	Pld	W	L	NR	Pts	NRR
1	Saurashtra	5	5	0	0	20	1.461
2	Uttar Pradesh	5	3	2	0	12	0.708
3	Jharkhand	5	2	3	0	8	−0.278
4	Hyderabad	5	2	3	0	8	−0.358
5	Delhi	5	2	3	0	8	−0.630
6	Haryana	5	1	4	0	4	−0.896

Source: ESPN Cricinfo

Advanced to Quarter-final
Advanced to Preliminary quarter-final

==== Matches ====
Group stage

8 December 2021	Haryana; 162 (39.2 overs)	v	Hyderabad; 167/5 (42 overs)	Hyderabad won by 5 wickets
09:00 Round 1 Scorecard	Haryana; 162 (39.2 overs)	v	Hyderabad; 167/5 (42 overs)	Maharaja Yadavindra Singh International Cricket Stadium, Mullanpur; Umpires: Joy Mahanta and Saidharshan Kumar
09:00 Round 1 Scorecard	Yashu Sharma 68 (70); Tilak Varma 4/23 (9.2 overs)		Tanmay Agarwal 77* (127); Yuzvendra Chahal 3/42 (10 overs)	Maharaja Yadavindra Singh International Cricket Stadium, Mullanpur; Umpires: Joy Mahanta and Saidharshan Kumar
Hyderabad won the toss and elected to field.; Chandan Sahani, Rahul Buddhi and Trishank Gupta (Hyderabad) all made their List-A debuts.				Maharaja Yadavindra Singh International Cricket Stadium, Mullanpur; Umpires: Joy Mahanta and Saidharshan Kumar

9 December 2021	Hyderabad; 325/6 (50 overs)	v	Delhi; 246/9 (50 overs)	Hyderabad won by 79 runs
09:00 Round 2 Scorecard	Hyderabad; 325/6 (50 overs)	v	Delhi; 246/9 (50 overs)	Punjab Cricket Association IS Bindra Stadium, Mohali; Umpires: KR Vasuki and Puttarangaiah Jayapal
09:00 Round 2 Scorecard	Tilak Varma 139 (123); Pradeep Sangwan 2/49 (10 overs)		Himmat Singh 47 (65); Tanay Thyagarajan 3/33 (10 overs)	Punjab Cricket Association IS Bindra Stadium, Mohali; Umpires: KR Vasuki and Puttarangaiah Jayapal
Delhi won the toss and elected to field.; Kartikeya Kak (Hyderabad) and Shivam Sharma (Delhi) both made their List-A debuts.				Punjab Cricket Association IS Bindra Stadium, Mohali; Umpires: KR Vasuki and Puttarangaiah Jayapal

11 December 2021	Hyderabad; 221 (49 overs)	v	Saurashtra; 225/3 (39 overs)	Saurashtra won by 7 wickets
09:00 Round 3 Scorecard	Hyderabad; 221 (49 overs)	v	Saurashtra; 225/3 (39 overs)	Punjab Cricket Association IS Bindra Stadium, Mohali; Umpires: Puttarangaiah Jayapal and Saidharshan Kumar
09:00 Round 3 Scorecard	Ravi Teja 63 (86); Prerak Mankad 4/54 (10 overs)		Harvik Desai 101* (108); Kartikeya Kak 1/44 (7 overs)	Punjab Cricket Association IS Bindra Stadium, Mohali; Umpires: Puttarangaiah Jayapal and Saidharshan Kumar
Saurashtra won the toss and elected to field.; Abhirath Reddy (Hyderabad) made his List-A debut.				Punjab Cricket Association IS Bindra Stadium, Mohali; Umpires: Puttarangaiah Jayapal and Saidharshan Kumar

12 December 2021	Hyderabad; 149 (42.5 overs)	v	Uttar Pradesh; 151/3 (26 overs)	Uttar Pradesh won by 7 wickets
09:00 Round 4 Scorecard	Hyderabad; 149 (42.5 overs)	v	Uttar Pradesh; 151/3 (26 overs)	Maharaja Yadavindra Singh International Cricket Stadium, Mullanpur; Umpires: Anand Ovalekar and Puttarangaiah Jayapal
09:00 Round 4 Scorecard	Rahul Buddhi 49 (63); Yash Dayal 5/31 (9.5 overs)		Karan Sharma 44* (36); Ravi Teja 1/30 (6 overs)	Maharaja Yadavindra Singh International Cricket Stadium, Mullanpur; Umpires: Anand Ovalekar and Puttarangaiah Jayapal
Uttar Pradesh won the toss and elected to field.				Maharaja Yadavindra Singh International Cricket Stadium, Mullanpur; Umpires: Anand Ovalekar and Puttarangaiah Jayapal

14 December 2021	Jharkhand; 276 (50 overs)	v	Hyderabad; 240 (48.4 overs)	Jharkhand won by 36 runs.
09:00 Round 5 Scorecard	Jharkhand; 276 (50 overs)	v	Hyderabad; 240 (48.4 overs)	Sector 16 Stadium, Chandigarh; Umpires: Anand Ovalekar and Puttarangaiah Jayapal
09:00 Round 5 Scorecard	Virat Singh 65 (59); Chama Milind 6/63 (10 overs)		Tanmay Agarwal 59 (72); Shahbaz Nadeem 3/32 (6.4 overs)	Sector 16 Stadium, Chandigarh; Umpires: Anand Ovalekar and Puttarangaiah Jayapal
Hyderabad won the toss and elected to field.; Atul Vyas (Hyderabad) made his List-A debut.				Sector 16 Stadium, Chandigarh; Umpires: Anand Ovalekar and Puttarangaiah Jayapal

=== Ranji Trophy ===
The Ranji Trophy, a first-class cricket tournament in India, fixtures were announced by the Board of Control for Cricket in India (BCCI) on 30 August 2021 and the Hyderabad was placed in the Group C with all the group fixtures to be played at Kolkata. The Hyderabad announced their squad on 27 December 2021. The tournament was scheduled to start on 13 January 2022 but was postponed due to the rise in COVID-19 cases in India. The BCCI announced revised schedule for the tournament on 3 February 2022 with league stage to be conducted between February 10 and March 15 and knockout stage between May 30 and June 26.

The Hyderabad started their campaign with a win against the Chandigarh but lost to Bengal in their second match. Despite winning their final group stage match against the Baroda, they missed out on qualification for the knockout stage by finishing second in their group.

==== Points table ====
Pos	Team	Pld	W	L	T	D	NR	Pts	Quot
1	Bengal	3	3	0	0	0	0	18	1.308
2	Hyderabad	3	2	1	0	0	0	12	1.196
3	Baroda	3	0	2	0	1	0	3	0.938
4	Chandigarh	3	0	2	0	1	0	1	0.694

Updated to match(es) played on 6 March 2022. Source: ESPN Cricinfo

Advances to Quarter-final

==== Matches ====
Group stage

17–20 February 2022	Hyderabad	v	Chandigarh	Hyderabad won by 217 runs
Round 1 Scorecard	347 (108.4 overs); Hanuma Vihari 59 (134); Jagjit Singh 4/80 (29 overs)		216 (72 overs); Manan Vohra 110 (167); Rakshann Readdi 5/61 (17.3 overs)	Vikas Cricket Ground, Cuttack; Umpires: Vinod Seshan and VM Dhokre; Player of the match: Ravi Teja (Hyderabad)
Round 1 Scorecard	269/8d (62 overs); Hanuma Vihari 106 (149); Gaurav Gambhir 4/61 (17 overs)		183 (50.5 overs); Arslan Khan 68 (90); Ravi Teja 6/41 (17 overs)	Vikas Cricket Ground, Cuttack; Umpires: Vinod Seshan and VM Dhokre; Player of the match: Ravi Teja (Hyderabad)
Chandigarh won the toss and elected to field.; Arjit Pannu, Gaurav Puri, Raj Bawa (Chandigarh), Mickil Jaiswal and Rakshann Readdi (Hyderabad) all made their first-class debuts.

24–27 February 2022	Bengal	v	Hyderabad	Bengal won by 72 runs
Round 2 Scorecard	242 (70.2 overs); Abhishek Porel 73 (62); Tanay Thyagarajan 5/71 (18.2 overs)		205 (80 overs); Ravi Teja 81* (196); Mukesh Kumar 4/49 (24 overs)	Barabati Stadium, Cuttack; Umpires: Arun Kumar Basa and Vineet Kulkarni; Player of the match: Shahbaz Ahmed (Bengal)
Round 2 Scorecard	201 (79 overs); Shahbaz Ahmed 51 (87); Tilak Varma 3/13 (3 overs)		166 (61.2 overs); Tilak Varma 90 (152); Akash Deep 4/41 (13.2 overs)	Barabati Stadium, Cuttack; Umpires: Arun Kumar Basa and Vineet Kulkarni; Player of the match: Shahbaz Ahmed (Bengal)
Hyderabad won the toss and elected to field.; B Punnaiah (Hyderabad) made his first-class debut.

3–6 March 2022	Hyderabad	v	Baroda	Hyderabad won by 43 runs
Round 3 Scorecard	197 (55.1 overs); Jaweed Ali 65 (90); Atit Sheth 5/53 (16.1 overs)		163 (47 overs); Vishnu Solanki 32 (44); B Punnaiah 4/35 (17 overs)	Vikas Cricket Ground, Cuttack; Umpires: VM Dhokre and Puttarangaiah Jayapal; Player of the match: Ravi Teja (Hyderabad)
Round 3 Scorecard	201 (72.2 overs); Ravi Teja 56 (123); Babashafi Pathan 4/35 (13 overs)		192 (53.4 overs); Babashafi Pathan 36 (21); Ravi Teja 4/70 (16 overs)	Vikas Cricket Ground, Cuttack; Umpires: VM Dhokre and Puttarangaiah Jayapal; Player of the match: Ravi Teja (Hyderabad)
Baroda won the toss and elected to field.; Alankrit Agarwal, Chandan Sahani and Surya Prasad (Hyderabad) all made their first-class debuts.

== Player statistics ==
=== Batting ===
Player	First class							List A							Twenty20							
Player	Matches	Innings	Runs	Highest score	Average	100s	50s	Matches	Innings	Runs	Highest score	Average	100s	50s	Matches	Innings	Runs	Highest score	Average	Strike rate	100s	50s
Batsmen
Alankrit Agarwal	1	2	12	6	6.00	0	0															
Himalay Agarwal	2	4	49	20	12.25	0	0	1	1	4	4	4.00	0	0	7	6	64	23	10.66	95.52	0	0
Tanmay Agarwal	3	6	134	49	22.33	0	0	5	5	145	77*	36.25	0	2	7	7	334	97*	55.66	148.44	0	4
Jaweed Ali	1	2	65	65	32.50	0	1															
Rahul Buddhi	1	2	21	17	10.50	0	0	5	5	111	49	22.20	0	0	7	7	131	38*	43.66	139.36	0	0
Rohit Rayudu	1	2	52	49	26.00	0	0								2	1	4	4	4.00	44.44	0	0
Abhirath Reddy								3	3	50	22	16.66	0	0								
Akshath Reddy	2	4	32	28	8.00	0	0	2	2	43	34	21.50	0	0								
Tilak Varma	3	6	216	90	36.00	0	2	5	5	180	139	36.00	1	0	7	7	215	75	35.83	147.26	0	2
Hanuma Vihari	1	2	165	106	82.50	1	1								4	4	94	57	23.50	110.58	0	1
All-rounders
Mickil Jaiswal	2	4	34	24	8.50	0	0	3	2	13	11	6.50	0	0								
Chandan Sahani	1	2	60	54	30.00	0	1	4	4	99	87	24.75	0	1								
Bavanaka Sandeep															4	4	37	18	9.25	102.77	0	0
Ravi Teja	3	6	197	81*	39.40	0	2	5	4	118	63	39.33	0	1	6	4	18	9	4.25	69.23	0	0
Tanay Thyagarajan	3	6	153	52	30.60	0	2	5	5	83	22	27.66	0	0	7	4	46	25	15.33	117.94	0	0
Wicket-keepers
Pragnay Reddy															5	4	11	8	2.75	40.74	0	0
Prateek Reddy	3	6	73	36	12.16	0	0															
Kolla Sumanth								5	5	101	34	20.20	0	0	2	2	31	21*	31.00	110.71	0	0
Bowlers
Trishank Gupta								2	1	1	1	1.00	0	0	1	–	–	–	–	–	–	–
Mehdi Hasan															2	1	3	3	3.00	37.50	0	0
Kartikeya Kak								3	2	5	5	5.00	0	0								
Chama Milind	1	1	28	28	28.00	0	0	5	3	58	26	29.00	0	0	7	4	35	14*	35.00	116.66	0	0
Surya Prasad	1	2	8	7	8.00	0	0															
B Punnaiah	2	4	4	4	2.00	0	0															
Abdul Ela Al Quraishi															1	–	–	–	–	–	–	–
Rakshann Readdi	2	4	26	12*	13.00	0	0	1	–	–	–	–	–	–	4	1	0	0*	–	0.00	0	0
Elligaram Sanketh															1	–	–	–	–	–	–	–
Mohammad Siraj															3	–	–	–	–	–	–	–
Atul Vyas								1	1	1	1*	–	0	0								
Source: ESPNcricinfo

=== Bowling ===
Player	First class								List A							Twenty20						
Player	Matches	Overs	Wickets	Average	BBI	BBM	5wi	10wm	Matches	Overs	Wickets	Average	Economy	BBI	5wi	Matches	Overs	Wickets	Average	Economy	BBI	4wi
Tanmay Agarwal									5	1.0	0	–	2.00	–	0							
Trishank Gupta									2	14.0	3	31.33	6.71	2/43	0	1	2.0	0	–	6.00	–	0
Mehdi Hasan																2	6.00	0	–	8.16	–	0
Mickil Jaiswal	2	18.0	0	–	–	–	0	0	3	21.0	2	51.50	4.90	1/38	0							
Kartikeya Kak									3	19.0	3	31.33	4.94	2/28	0							
Chama Milind	1	7.0	0	–	–	–	0	0	5	37.0	8	26.87	5.81	6/63	1	7	24.5	18	11.61	8.41	5/8	2
Surya Prasad	1	22.4	3	28.33	2/49	3/85	0	0														
B Punnaiah	2	57.1	9	15.66	4/35	6/76	0	0														
Abdul Ela Al Quraishi																1	4.0	1	29.00	7.25	1/29	0
Rohit Rayudu	1	2.0	0	–	–	–	0	0								2	2.0	1	17.00	8.50	1/7	0
Rakshann Readdi	2	70.2	9	25.11	5/61	8/123	1	0								4	15.2	4	23.25	6.06	2/23	0
Abhirath Reddy									3	3.0	0	–	6.33	–	0							
Bavanaka Sandeep																4	6.0	2	21.00	7.00	2/26	0
Elligaram Sanketh																1	2.0	0	–	8.50	–	0
Mohammad Siraj																3	11.0	5	13.40	6.09	3/38	0
Ravi Teja	3	93.5	20	14.95	6/41	9/94	1	0	5	39.0	6	37.00	5.69	3/23	0	6	21.0	7	20.57	6.85	3/27	0
Tanay Thyagarajan	3	96.5	14	21.92	5/71	8/115	1	0	5	46.0	7	27.28	4.15	3/33	0	7	26.0	4	41.25	6.34	1/20	0
Tilak Varma	1	3.0	3	4.33	3/13	3/13	0	0	5	18.2	4	17.50	3.81	4/23	0	7	1.0	0	–	9.00	–	0
Hanuma Vihari	1	2.0	0	–	–	–	0	0								4	11.0	4	20.50	7.45	2/16	0
Atul Vyas									1	6.0	0	–	5.50	–	0							
Source: ESPNcricinfo

=== Fielding ===
Player	First class			List A			Twenty20		
Player	Matches	Catches	Stumpings	Matches	Catches	Stumpings	Matches	Catches	Stumpings
Alankrit Agarwal	1	1	–						
Himalay Agarwal	2	0	–	1	0	–	7	0	–
Tanmay Agarwal	3	5	–	5	2	–	7	6	–
Jaweed Ali	1	1	–						
Rahul Buddhi	1	1	–	5	1	–	7	4	–
Trishank Gupta				2	0	–	1	0	–
Mehdi Hasan							2	0	–
Mickil Jaiswal	2	0	–	3	0	–			
Kartikeya Kak				3	0	–			
Chama Milind	1	0	–	5	1	–	7	3	–
Surya Prasad	1	0	–						
B Punnaiah	2	1	–						
Abdul Ela Al Quraishi							1	0	–
Rohit Rayudu	1	0	–				2	1	–
Rakshann Readdi	2	0	–	1	0	–	4	0	–
Abhirath Reddy				3	2	–			
Akshath Reddy	2	0	–	2	1	–			
Pragnay Reddy							5	3	1
Prateek Reddy	3	18	3						
Chandan Sahani	1	3	–	4	3	–			
Bavanaka Sandeep							4	5	–
Elligaram Sanketh							1	0	–
Mohammad Siraj							3	0	–
Kolla Sumanth				5	7	0	2	1	0
Ravi Teja	3	0	–	5	1	–	6	1	–
Tanay Thyagarajan	3	2	–	5	2	–	7	6	–
Tilak Varma	3	1	–	5	2	–	7	1	–
Hanuma Vihari	1	4	–				4	3	–
Atul Vyas				1	1	–			
Source: ESPNcricinfo
