= 2021–22 Syed Mushtaq Ali Trophy Group E =

Cricket tournament

- Dates: 4 – 22 November 2021
- Administrator(s): BCCI
- Cricket format: Twenty20 cricket
- Tournament format(s): Round-robin
- Participants: 6

The 2021–22 Syed Mushtaq Ali Trophy was the fourteenth season of the Syed Mushtaq Ali Trophy, a Twenty20 cricket tournament played in India. It was contested by 38 teams, divided into six groups, with six teams in Group E. The tournament was announced by BCCI on 3 July 2021.

Hyderabad won all five of their matches, with Saurashtra winning four matches. Therefore, Hyderabad advanced to the quarter-finals and Saurashtra progressed to the preliminary quarter-finals.

== Points table ==
Pos	Team	Pld	W	L	NR	Pts	NRR
1	Hyderabad	5	5	0	0	20	1.114
2	Saurashtra	5	4	1	0	16	0.511
3	Delhi	5	3	2	0	12	0.982
4	Uttar Pradesh	5	2	3	0	8	−0.399
5	Chandigarh	5	1	4	0	4	−0.973
6	Uttarakhand	5	0	5	0	0	−1.244

Source: ESPN Cricinfo

Advanced to Quarter-final
Advanced to Preliminary quarter-final

== Fixtures ==
=== Round 1 ===
4 November 2021
Scorecard

Saurashtra; 173/8 (20 overs)	v	Hyderabad; 177/8 (19.3 overs)
Prerak Mankad 71 (46); Mohammed Siraj 3/38 (4 overs)		Tanmay Agarwal 55 (35); Chetan Sakariya 3/31 (4 overs)

Hyderabad won by 2 wickets
Gurgaon Cricket Ground, Sultanpur
Umpires: Pashchim Pathak and Krishnaraj Srinath

- Hyderabad won the toss and elected to field.
- Parth Bhut and Jay Gohil (Saurashtra) both made their T20 debuts.

4 November 2021
Scorecard

Uttar Pradesh; 165/4 (20 overs)	v	Chandigarh; 143/5 (20 overs)
Karan Sharma 60 (50); Bhagmender Lather 1/24 (4 overs)		Manan Vohra 42 (39); Ankit Rajpoot 2/25 (4 overs)

Uttar Pradesh won by 22 runs
Gurgaon Cricket Ground, Sultanpur
Umpires: Pashchim Pathak and Krishnaraj Srinath

- Uttar Pradesh won the toss and elected to bat.
- Shivam Sharma (Uttar Pradesh) and Parmesh Vaidik (Chandigarh) both made their T20 debuts.

4 November 2021
Scorecard

Delhi; 121/8 (20 overs)	v	Uttarakhand; 86 (18 overs)
Himmat Singh 35 (34); Mayank Mishra 3/11 (4 overs)		Dikshanshu Negi 21 (26); Shivank Vashisht 5/19 (4 overs)

Delhi won by 35 runs
Chaudhary Bansi Lal Cricket Stadium, Rohtak
Umpires: Abhijit Deshmukh and Akshay Totre

- Uttarakhand won the toss and elected to field.
- Priyansh Arya (Delhi), Vijay Jethi and Ankit Manori (Uttarakhand) all made their T20 debuts.

=== Round 2 ===
5 November 2021
Scorecard

Saurashtra; 147/7 (20 overs)	v	Uttar Pradesh; 145/8 (20 overs)
Prerak Mankad 34* (30); Shivam Sharma 2/20 (4 overs)		Rinku Singh 63* (41); Dharmendrasinh Jadeja 2/24 (4 overs)

Saurashtra won by 2 runs
Gurgaon Cricket Ground, Sultanpur
Umpires: Abhijit Deshmukh and Akshay Totre

- Uttar Pradesh won the toss and elected to field.

5 November 2021
Scorecard

Hyderabad; 167/5 (20 overs)	v	Uttarakhand; 106 (18.3 overs)
Tanmay Agarwal 97* (59); Dikshanshu Negi 2/18 (4 overs)		Dikshanshu Negi 18 (12); Chama Milind 5/16 (3.3 overs)

Hyderabad won by 61 runs
Gurgaon Cricket Ground, Sultanpur
Umpires: Abhijit Deshmukh and Akshay Totre

- Hyderabad won the toss and elected to bat.
- Md Nazim (Uttarakhand) made his T20 debut.

5 November 2021
Scorecard

Chandigarh; 144/8 (20 overs)	v	Delhi; 148/3 (17.2 overs)
Sarul Kanwar 50 (36); Pradeep Sangwan 2/22 (4 overs)		Nitish Rana 50* (25); Gurinder Singh 1/19 (4 overs)

Delhi won by 7 wickets
Chaudhary Bansi Lal Cricket Stadium, Rohtak
Umpires: Rohan Pandit and Navdeep Singh

- Delhi won the toss and elected to field.

=== Round 3 ===
6 November 2021
Scorecard

Uttar Pradesh; 108/8 (20 overs)	v	Delhi; 109/1 (13.2 overs)
Madhav Kaushik 30 (37); Deepak Punia 3/15 (4 overs)		Anuj Rawat 50 (32); Saurabh Kumar 1/10 (1.2 overs)

Delhi won by 9 wickets
Chaudhary Bansi Lal Cricket Stadium, Rohtak
Umpires: Pashchim Pathak and Krishnaraj Srinath

- Delhi won the toss and elected to field.

6 November 2021
Scorecard

Chandigarh; 162/5 (20 overs)	v	Hyderabad; 163/2 (18.4 overs)
Manan Vohra 106* (64); Ravi Teja 2/19 (4 overs)		Tilak Varma 61* (29); Arpit Pannu 1/17 (4 overs)

Hyderabad won by 8 wickets
Gurgaon Cricket Ground, Sultanpur
Umpires: Rohan Pandit and Navdeep Singh

- Hyderabad won the toss and elected to field.
- Arjit Pannu and Arpit Pannu (Chandigarh) both made their T20 debuts.

6 November 2021
Scorecard

Saurashtra; 146/3 (20 overs)	v	Uttarakhand; 144/5 (20 overs)
Sheldon Jackson 62* (50); Agrim Tiwari 2/32 (4 overs)		Robin Bist 45* (32); Jaydev Unadkat 2/21 (4 overs)

Saurashtra won by 2 runs
Gurgaon Cricket Ground, Sultanpur
Umpires: Rohan Pandit and Navdeep Singh

- Saurashtra won the toss and elected to bat.
- Vaibhav Bhatt (Uttarakhand) made his T20 debut.

=== Round 4 ===
8 November 2021
Scorecard

Delhi; 170/5 (20 overs)	v	Hyderabad; 171/7 (20 overs)
Anuj Rawat 41 (33); Chama Milind 2/49 (4 overs)		Tanmay Agarwal 54 (34); Pradeep Sangwan 3/27 (4 overs)

Hyderabad won by 3 wickets
Gurgaon Cricket Ground, Sultanpur
Umpires: Pashchim Pathak and Krishnaraj Srinath

- Hyderabad won the toss and elected to field.
- Abdul Ela Al Quraishi (Hyderabad) made his T20 debut.

8 November 2021
Scorecard

Uttarakhand; 124/7 (20 overs)	v	Uttar Pradesh; 125/3 (17.3 overs)
Jay Bista 37 (36); Shivam Mavi 2/22 (4 overs)		Karan Sharma 52 (49); Akash Madhwal 1/18 (3.3 overs)

Uttar Pradesh won by 7 wickets
Gurgaon Cricket Ground, Sultanpur
Umpires: Pashchim Pathak and Krishnaraj Srinath

- Uttarakhand won the toss and elected to bat.
- Tanush Gusain (Uttarakhand) made his T20 debut.

8 November 2021
Scorecard

Saurashtra; 209/4 (20 overs)	v	Chandigarh; 167/6 (20 overs)
Arpit Vasavada 72 (47); Bhagmender Lather 2/41 (3 overs)		Arjit Pannu 44 (32); Chetan Sakariya 3/25 (4 overs)

Saurashtra won by 42 runs
Chaudhary Bansi Lal Cricket Stadium, Rohtak
Umpires: Abhijit Deshmukh and Akshay Totre

- Saurashtra won the toss and elected to bat.

=== Round 5 ===
9 November 2021
Scorecard

Uttarakhand; 161/5 (20 overs)	v	Chandigarh; 164/4 (19.3 overs)
Sanyam Arora 68* (46); Gurinder Singh 2/21 (3 overs)		Manan Vohra 74 (60); Agrim Tiwari 3/26 (4 overs)

Chandigarh won by 6 wickets
Gurgaon Cricket Ground, Sultanpur
Umpires: Rohan Pandit and Navdeep Singh

- Chandigarh won the toss and elected to field.
- Deepesh Nainwal, Sanyam Arora (Uttarakhand) and Yuvraj Chaudhary (Chandigarh) all made their T20 debuts.

9 November 2021
Scorecard

Saurashtra; 166/6 (20 overs)	v	Delhi; 153/5 (20 overs)
Sheldon Jackson 79* (47); Shivank Vashisht 2/24 (4 overs)		Dhruv Shorey 33 (34); Kushang Patel 2/35 (4 overs)

Saurashtra won by 13 runs
Chaudhary Bansi Lal Cricket Stadium, Rohtak
Umpires: Abhijit Deshmukh and Akshay Totre

- Saurashtra won the toss and elected to bat.

9 November 2021
Scorecard

Hyderabad; 147/7 (20 overs)	v	Uttar Pradesh; 118 (19.2 overs)
Tanmay Agarwal 62 (46); Yash Dayal 2/20 (4 overs)		Akshdeep Nath 36 (32); Chama Milind 5/8 (3.2 overs)

Hyderabad won by 29 runs
Gurgaon Cricket Ground, Sultanpur
Umpires: Rohan Pandit and Navdeep Singh

- Hyderabad won the toss and elected to bat.
