= 2021–22 Vijay Hazare Trophy Group C =

Cricket tournament

- Dates: 8 – 27 December 2021
- Administrator(s): BCCI
- Cricket format: List A cricket
- Tournament format(s): Round-robin
- Participants: 6

The 2021–22 Vijay Hazare Trophy was the twentieth season of the Vijay Hazare Trophy, a List A cricket tournament that was played in India. It was being contested by 38 teams, divided into six groups, with six teams in Group C. The tournament was announced by the BCCI on 3 July 2021. Saurashtra won Group C to progress to the quarter-finals, with Uttar Pradesh finishing in second place to advance to the preliminary quarter-finals.

== Points table ==
Pos	Team	Pld	W	L	NR	Pts	NRR
1	Saurashtra	5	5	0	0	20	1.461
2	Uttar Pradesh	5	3	2	0	12	0.708
3	Jharkhand	5	2	3	0	8	−0.278
4	Hyderabad	5	2	3	0	8	−0.358
5	Delhi	5	2	3	0	8	−0.630
6	Haryana	5	1	4	0	4	−0.896

Source: ESPN Cricinfo

Advanced to Quarter-final
Advanced to Preliminary quarter-final

== Fixtures ==
=== Round 1 ===
8 December 2021
Scorecard

Jharkhand; 263/8 (50 overs)	v	Delhi; 264/4 (47 overs)
Virat Singh 79 (104); Pradeep Sangwan 3/46 (10 overs)		Himmat Singh 113* (124); Varun Aaron 1/41 (7 overs)

Delhi won by 6 wickets
Punjab Cricket Association IS Bindra Stadium, Mohali
Umpires: Jayaraman Madanagopal and Kamlesh Sharma

- Delhi won the toss and elected to field.
- Sushant Mishra (Jharkhand) made his List A debut.

8 December 2021
Scorecard

Haryana; 162 (39.2 overs)	v	Hyderabad; 167/5 (41 overs)
Yashu Sharma 68 (70); Tilak Varma 4/23 (9.2 overs)		Tanmay Agarwal 77* (127); Yuzvendra Chahal 3/42 (10 overs)

Hyderabad won by 5 wickets
Maharaja Yadavindra Singh International Cricket Stadium, Mullanpur
Umpires: Sai Dharshan Kumar and Joy Mahanta

- Hyderabad won the toss and elected to field.
- Chandan Sahani, Rahul Buddhi and Trishank Gupta (Hyderabad) all made their List A debuts.

8 December 2021
Scorecard

Saurashtra; 223 (47.3 overs)	v	Uttar Pradesh; 191 (48.1 overs)
Harvik Desai 52 (89); Shivam Mavi 4/26 (8.3 overs)		Rinku Singh 65 (71); Chirag Jani 5/35 (9.1 overs)

Saurashtra won by 32 runs
Sector 16 Stadium, Chandigarh
Umpires: Puttarangaiah Jayapal and Anand Ovalekar

- Uttar Pradesh won the toss and elected to field.
- Almas Shaukat (Uttar Pradesh) made his List A debut.

=== Round 2 ===
9 December 2021
Scorecard

Hyderabad; 325/6 (50 overs)	v	Delhi; 246/9 (50 overs)
Tilak Varma 139 (123); Pradeep Sangwan 2/49 (10 overs)		Himmat Singh 47 (65); Tanay Thyagarajan 3/33 (10 overs)

Hyderabad won by 79 runs
Punjab Cricket Association IS Bindra Stadium, Mohali
Umpires: Puttarangaiah Jayapal and KR Vasuki

- Delhi won the toss and elected to field.

9 December 2021
Scorecard

Uttar Pradesh; 239/7 (50 overs)	v	Jharkhand; 242/2 (46.1 overs)
Rinku Singh 104 (98); Rahul Shukla 3/51 (10 overs)		Nazim Siddiqui 116 (112); Shivam Mavi 1/29 (6 overs)

Jharkhand won by 8 wickets
Maharaja Yadavindra Singh International Cricket Stadium, Mullanpur
Umpires: Jayaraman Madanagopal and Kamlesh Sharma

- Jharkhand won the toss and elected to field.

9 December 2021
Scorecard

Haryana; 127 (38.4 overs)	v	Saurashtra; 131/5 (27.1 overs)
Chaitanya Bishnoi 41 (83); Dharmendrasinh Jadeja 4/14 (7.4 overs)		Arpit Vasavada 38 (46); Yuzvendra Chahal 2/31 (8.1 overs)

Saurashtra won by 5 wickets
Sector 16 Stadium, Chandigarh
Umpires: Sai Dharshan Kumar and Joy Mahanta

- Saurashtra won the toss and elected to field.

=== Round 3 ===
11 December 2021
Scorecard

Hyderabad; 221 (49 overs)	v	Saurashtra; 225 (39 overs)
Ravi Teja 63 (86); Prerak Mankad 4/54 (10 overs)		Harvik Desai 101* (108); Kartikeya Kak 1/44 (7 overs)

Saurashtra won by 7 wickets
Punjab Cricket Association IS Bindra Stadium, Mohali
Umpires: Puttarangaiah Jayapal and Saidharshan Kumar

- Saurashtra won the toss and elected to field.
- Abhirath Reddy (Hyderabad) made his List A debut.

11 December 2021
Scorecard

Haryana; 281/3 (50 overs)	v	Jharkhand; 253 (49.3 overs)
Himanshu Rana 94 (108); Utkarsh Singh 1/25 (7 overs)		Utkarsh Singh 78 (101); Yuzvendra Chahal 3/48 (10 overs)

Haryana won by 28 runs
Maharaja Yadavindra Singh International Cricket Stadium, Mullanpur
Umpires: Anand Ovalekar and KR Vasuki

- Jharkhand won the toss and elected to field.
- Tinu Kundu (Haryana) made his List A debut.

11 December 2021
Scorecard

Delhi; 243 (49 overs)	v	Uttar Pradesh; 244/1 (43.5 overs)
Lalit Yadav 57 (60); Shivam Mavi 4/48 (10 overs)		Aryan Juyal 120* (134); Simarjeet Singh 1/53 (10 overs)

Uttar Pradesh won by 9 wickets
Sector 16 Stadium, Chandigarh
Umpires: Jayaraman Madanagopal and Kamlesh Sharma

- Uttar Pradesh won the toss and elected to field.
- Sameer Rizvi (Uttar Pradesh) and Siddhant Sharma (Delhi) both made their List A debuts.

=== Round 4 ===
12 December 2021
Scorecard

Jharkhand; 211 (49.1 overs)	v	Saurashtra; 212/3 (34.4 overs)
Ishank Jaggi 56 (76); Yuvraj Chudasama 3/43 (9 overs)		Prerak Mankad 106* (72); Varun Aaron 2/34 (8 overs)

Saurashtra won by 7 wickets
Punjab Cricket Association IS Bindra Stadium, Mohali
Umpires: Saidharshan Kumar and Joy Mahanta

- Saurashtra won the toss and elected to field.

12 December 2021
Scorecard

Hyderabad; 149 (42.5 overs)	v	Uttar Pradesh; 151/3 (26 overs)
Rahul Buddhi 49 (63); Yash Dayal 5/31 (9.5 overs)		Karan Sharma 44* (36); Ravi Teja 1/30 (6 overs)

Uttar Pradesh won by 7 wickets
Maharaja Yadavindra Singh International Cricket Stadium, Mullanpur
Umpires: Puttarangaiah Jayapal and Anand Ovalekar

- Uttar Pradesh won the toss and elected to field.

12 December 2021
Scorecard

Delhi; 267/5 (50 overs)	v	Haryana; 257 (50 overs)
Jonty Sidhu 100* (100); Yuzvendra Chahal 3/43 (10 overs)		Shivam Chauhan 107 (136); Pradeep Sangwan 5/52 (10 overs)

Delhi won by 10 runs
Sector 16 Stadium, Chandigarh
Umpires: Kamlesh Sharma and KR Vasuki

- Haryana won the toss and elected to field.
- Mayank Yadav, Tejas Baroka and Vaibhav Kandpal (Delhi) all made their List A debuts.

=== Round 5 ===
14 December 2021
Scorecard

Uttar Pradesh; 245/9 (50 overs)	v	Haryana; 167 (38.5 overs)
Rinku Singh 75 (88); Yuzvendra Chahal 3/46 (10 overs)		Harshal Patel 67 (61); Ankit Rajpoot 5/33 (7.5 overs)

Uttar Pradesh won by 78 runs
Punjab Cricket Association IS Bindra Stadium, Mohali
Umpires: Jayaraman Madanagopal and Kamlesh Sharma

- Haryana won the toss and elected to field.

14 December 2021
Scorecard

Delhi; 201/8 (50 overs)	v	Saurashtra; 204/6 (38.1 overs)
Anuj Rawat 45 (57); Jaydev Unadkat 2/26 (9 overs)		Prerak Mankad 73 (63); Mayank Yadav 3/57 (9.1 overs)

Saurashtra won by 4 wickets
Maharaja Yadavindra Singh International Cricket Stadium, Mullanpur
Umpires: Saidharshan Kumar and Joy Mahanta

- Saurashtra won the toss and elected to field.

14 December 2021
Scorecard

Jharkhand; 276 (50 overs)	v	Hyderabad; 240 (48.4 overs)
Virat Singh 65 (59); Chama Milind 6/63 (10 overs)		Tanmay Agarwal 59 (72); Shahbaz Nadeem 3/32 (6.4 overs)

Jharkhand won by 36 runs
Sector 16 Stadium, Chandigarh
Umpires: Puttarangaiah Jayapal and Anand Ovalekar

- Hyderabad won the toss and elected to field.
- Atul Vyas and Timothy Ravi Kumar (Hyderabad) both made their List A debuts.
