= 2021–22 Ranji Trophy Group B =

Cricket tournament

- Dates: 17 February – 26 June 2022
- Administrator(s): BCCI
- Cricket format: First-class cricket
- Tournament format(s): Round-robin then knockout
- Participants: 4

The 2021–22 Ranji Trophy was the 87th season of the Ranji Trophy, the premier first-class cricket tournament in India. It was contested by 38 teams, divided into eight groups, with four teams in Group B. All the Group B league matches took place in Cuttack. The tournament was announced by the Board of Control for Cricket in India (BCCI) on 3 July 2021. Bengal won Group B to progress to the knockout stage of the tournament.

== Points table ==
Pos	Team	Pld	W	L	T	D	NR	Pts	Quot
1	Bengal	3	3	0	0	0	0	18	1.308
2	Hyderabad	3	2	1	0	0	0	12	1.196
3	Baroda	3	0	2	0	1	0	3	0.938
4	Chandigarh	3	0	2	0	1	0	1	0.694

Updated to match(es) played on 6 March 2022. Source: ESPN Cricinfo

Advances to Quarter-final

== Fixtures ==
=== Round 1 ===
17–20 February 2022
Scorecard

Baroda	v	Bengal
181 (54.2 overs); Mitesh Patel 66 (104); Ishan Porel 4/40 (14 overs)		88 (34.3 overs); Abishek Porel 21 (19); Atit Sheth 5/44 (13.3 overs)
255 (85.1 overs); Mitesh Patel 57 (100); Akash Deep 3/69 (26.1 overs)		350/6 (91.3 overs); Abhimanyu Easwaran 79 (116); Abhimanyusingh Rajput 3/73 (17 overs)

Bengal won by 4 wickets
Barabati Stadium, Cuttack
Umpires: Arun Kumar Basa and Puttarangaiah Jayapal
Player of the match: Shahbaz Ahmed (Bengal)

- Bengal won the toss and elected to field.
- Abishek Porel (Bengal), Jyotsnil Singh and Pratyush Kumar (Baroda) all made their first-class debuts.

17–20 February 2022
Scorecard

Hyderabad	v	Chandigarh
347 (108.4 overs); Hanuma Vihari 59 (134); Jagjit Singh 4/80 (29 overs)		216 (72 overs); Manan Vohra 110 (167); Rakshann Readdi 5/61 (17.3 overs)
269/8d (62 overs); Hanuma Vihari 106 (149); Gaurav Gambhir 4/61 (17 overs)		183 (50.5 overs); Arslan Khan 68 (90); Ravi Teja 6/41 (17 overs)

Hyderabad won by 217 runs
Vikas Cricket Ground, Cuttack
Umpires: Vinod Seshan and VM Dhokre
Player of the match: Ravi Teja (Hyderabad)

- Chandigarh won the toss and elected to field.
- Arjit Pannu, Gaurav Puri, Raj Bawa (Chandigarh), Mickil Jaiswal and Rakshann Readdi (Hyderabad) all made their first-class debuts.

=== Round 2 ===
24–27 February 2022
Scorecard

Bengal	v	Hyderabad
242 (70.2 overs); Abhishek Porel 73 (62); Tanay Thyagarajan 5/71 (18.2 overs)		205 (80 overs); Ravi Teja 81* (196); Mukesh Kumar 4/49 (24 overs)
201 (79 overs); Shahbaz Ahmed 51 (87); Tilak Varma 3/13 (3 overs)		166 (61.2 overs); Tilak Varma 90 (152); Akash Deep 4/41 (13.2 overs)

Bengal won by 72 runs
Barabati Stadium, Cuttack
Umpires: Arun Kumar Basa and Vineet Kulkarni
Player of the match: Shahbaz Ahmed (Bengal)

- Hyderabad won the toss and elected to field.
- B Punnaiah (Hyderabad) made his first-class debut.

24–27 February 2022
Scorecard

Chandigarh	v	Baroda
168 (62.3 overs); Manan Vohra 43 (45); Abhimanyusingh Rajput 5/47 (12.3 overs)		517 (132.2 overs); Vishnu Solanki 104 (165); Jagjit Singh 5/118 (34.2 overs)
473/7 (136 overs); Ankit Kaushik 105* (188); Bhargav Bhatt 3/133 (49 overs)

Match drawn
Vikas Cricket Ground, Cuttack
Umpires: Sadashiv Iyer and Vinod Seshan
Player of the match: Abhimanyusingh Rajput (Baroda)

- Baroda won the toss and elected to field.
- Amrit Lubana and Harnoor Singh (Chandigarh) both made their first-class debuts.

=== Round 3 ===
3–6 March 2022
Scorecard

Bengal	v	Chandigarh
437 (115.3 overs); Abhimanyu Easwaran 114 (172); Jagjit Singh 5/87 (31.3 overs)		206 (68.2 overs); Ankit Kaushik 63 (113); Nilkantha Das 3/47 (18 overs)
181/8d (56.1 overs); Anustup Majumdar 43 (94); Jaskaran Singh 2/32 (9 overs)		260 (96.2 overs); Jaskaran Singh 80 (89); Ishan Porel 3/37 (15.2)

Bengal won by 152 runs
Barabati Stadium, Cuttack
Umpires: Sadashiv Iyer and Vineet Kulkarni
Player of the match: Abhimanyu Easwaran (Bengal)

- Chandigarh won the toss and elected to field.

3–6 March 2022
Scorecard

Hyderabad	v	Baroda
197 (55.1 overs); Jaweed Ali 65 (90); Atit Sheth 5/53 (16.1 overs)		163 (47 overs); Vishnu Solanki 32 (44); Bhuvangagiri Punnaiah 4/35 (17 overs)
201 (72.2 overs); Ravi Teja 56 (123); Babashafi Pathan 4/35 (13 overs)		192 (53.4 overs); Babashafi Pathan 36 (21); Ravi Teja 4/70 (16 overs)

Hyderabad won by 43 runs
Vikas Cricket Ground, Cuttack
Umpires: VM Dhokre and Puttarangaiah Jayapal
Player of the match: Ravi Teja (Hyderabad)

- Baroda won the toss and elected to field.
- Alankrit Agarwal, Chandan Sahani and Surya Prasad (Hyderabad) all made their first-class debuts.
