= Trishank Gupta =

Indian cricketer (born 2001)

Personal information
- Born: 24 September 2001 (age 25); Hyderabad, India
- Batting: Right-handed
- Bowling: Right-arm leg break

Domestic team information
- Years: Team
- 2021–present: Hyderabad
- Source: Cricinfo, 22 December 2021

Trishank Gupta (born 24 September 2001) is an Indian cricketer. He made his Twenty20 debut for Hyderabad in the 2021–22 Syed Mushtaq Ali Trophy on 9 November 2021. He made his List-A debut for Hyderabad in the 2021–22 Vijay Hazare Trophy on 8 December 2021.
