= List of 2022 Indian Premier League personnel changes =

2022 Indian Premier League Auction

General information
- Sport: Cricket
- Date(s): 12 & 13 February 2022
- Time: 12:00 PM IST
- Location: Bengaluru, Karnataka
- Network(s): Star Sports & Disney+ Hotstar
- Sponsored by: Tata

Overview
- League: Indian Premier League
- Teams: 10
- Expansion teams: 2
- Expansion season: 2022

This is a list of all personnel changes for 2022 Indian Premier League (IPL).

== Retirement ==
Date	Name	IPL 2021 Team	Age	Ref.
19 November 2021	AB de Villiers	Royal Challengers Bangalore	37	
24 December 2021	Harbhajan Singh	Kolkata Knight Riders	41	
11 January 2022	Chris Morris	Rajasthan Royals	34	

== Pre-auction ==
The BCCI set the deadline of 30 November 2021 for the IPL teams to submit the list of retained players.

=== Player retention ===
- With a total salary cap of INR 90 crore available at the mega auction for each team, the eight franchises were eligible to retain up to 4 players with a maximum of 3 Indians, 2 overseas players and 2 uncapped Indians.
- The new franchises (Lucknow Super Giants And Gujarat Titans), can pick up to three players each out of all released players from the existing 8 franchises. The franchises can pick up to 2 Indian players and 1 overseas player.

Salary Cap of Retained Players (For Existing Franchises) And Picks (For New Franchises)
No. of players retained	Salary Cap for retentions				Total amount to be spent
No. of players retained	Player 1	Player 2	Player 3	Player 4	Total amount to be spent
4	₹16 crore (US$1.9 million)	₹12 crore (US$1.4 million)	₹8 crore (US$950,000)	₹6 crore (US$710,000)	₹42 crore (US$5.0 million)
3	₹15 crore (US$1.8 million)	₹11 crore (US$1.3 million)	₹7 crore (US$830,000)	–	₹33 crore (US$3.9 million)
2	₹14 crore (US$1.7 million)	₹10 crore (US$1.2 million)	–	–	₹24 crore (US$2.8 million)
1	₹14 crore (US$1.7 million)	–	–	–	₹14 crore (US$1.7 million)

The retained players were announced on 30 November 2021. The picks of the two new teams were announced on 22 January 2022.

Player	Nationality	Salary
Chennai Super Kings
Ravindra Jadeja	India	₹16 crore (US$1.9 million)
MS Dhoni	India	₹12 crore (US$1.4 million)
Moeen Ali	England	₹8 crore (US$950,000)
Ruturaj Gaikwad	India	₹6 crore (US$710,000)
Delhi Capitals
Rishabh Pant	India	₹16 crore (US$1.9 million)
Axar Patel	India	₹9 crore (US$1.1 million) (Note: Axar Patel was retained at a salary of ₹9 crore (US$1.1 million) but as per the IPL rules, the actual purse deduction for the Delhi team was ₹12 crore (US$1.4 million).)
Prithvi Shaw	India	₹7.5 crore (US$890,000) (Note: Shaw was retained at a salary of ₹7.5 crore (US$890,000) but as per the IPL rules, the actual purse deduction for the Delhi team was ₹8 crore (US$950,000).)
Anrich Nortje	South Africa	₹6.5 crore (US$770,000)
Gujarat Titans
Hardik Pandya	India	₹15 crore (US$1.8 million)
Rashid Khan	Afghanistan	₹15 crore (US$1.8 million)
Shubman Gill	India	₹8 crore (US$950,000)
Kolkata Knight Riders
Andre Russell	West Indies	₹12 crore (US$1.4 million) (Note: Russell was retained at a salary of ₹12 crore (US$1.4 million) but as per the IPL rules, the actual purse deduction for the Kolkata team was ₹16 crore (US$1.9 million).)
Varun Chakravarthy	India	₹8 crore (US$950,000) (Note: Chakravarthy was retained at a salary of ₹8 crore (US$950,000) but as per the IPL rules, the actual purse deduction for the Kolkata team was ₹12 crore (US$1.4 million).)
Venkatesh Iyer	India	₹8 crore (US$950,000)
Sunil Narine	West Indies	₹6 crore (US$710,000)
Lucknow Super Giants
KL Rahul	India	₹17 crore (US$2.0 million)
Marcus Stoinis	Australia	₹9.2 crore (US$1.1 million)
Ravi Bishnoi	India	₹4 crore (US$470,000)
Mumbai Indians
Rohit Sharma	India	₹16 crore (US$1.9 million)
Jasprit Bumrah	India	₹12 crore (US$1.4 million)
Suryakumar Yadav	India	₹8 crore (US$950,000)
Kieron Pollard	West Indies	₹6 crore (US$710,000)
Punjab Kings
Mayank Agarwal	India	₹12 crore (US$1.4 million) (Note: Agarwal was retained at a salary of ₹12 crore (US$1.4 million) but as per the IPL rules, the actual purse deduction for the Punjab team was ₹14 crore (US$1.7 million).)
Arshdeep Singh	India	₹4 crore (US$470,000)
Rajasthan Royals
Sanju Samson	India	₹14 crore (US$1.7 million)
Jos Buttler	England	₹10 crore (US$1.2 million)
Yashasvi Jaiswal	India	₹4 crore (US$470,000)
Royal Challengers Bangalore
Virat Kohli	India	₹15 crore (US$1.8 million)
Glenn Maxwell	Australia	₹11 crore (US$1.3 million)
Mohammed Siraj	India	₹7 crore (US$830,000)
Sunrisers Hyderabad
Kane Williamson	New Zealand	₹14 crore (US$1.7 million)
Abdul Samad	India	₹4 crore (US$470,000)
Umran Malik	India	₹4 crore (US$470,000)

=== Summary ===
Pre-Auction summary
Team	Retained		Retained players salary cap	Deduction Amount	Funds Remaining
Team	Players	Overseas	Retained players salary cap	Deduction Amount	Funds Remaining
Chennai	4	1	₹42 crore (US$5.0 million)	₹42 crore (US$5.0 million)	₹48 crore (US$5.7 million)
Delhi	4	1	₹39 crore (US$4.6 million)	₹42.5 crore (US$5.0 million)	₹47.5 crore (US$5.6 million)
Gujarat	3	1	₹38 crore (US$4.5 million)	₹38 crore (US$4.5 million)	₹52 crore (US$6.2 million)
Kolkata	4	2	₹34 crore (US$4.0 million)	₹42 crore (US$5.0 million)	₹48 crore (US$5.7 million)
Lucknow	3	1	₹30.2 crore (US$3.6 million)	₹31 crore (US$3.7 million)	₹59 crore (US$7.0 million)
Mumbai	4	1	₹42 crore (US$5.0 million)	₹42 crore (US$5.0 million)	₹48 crore (US$5.7 million)
Punjab	2	–	₹16 crore (US$1.9 million)	₹18 crore (US$2.1 million)	₹72 crore (US$8.5 million)
Rajasthan	3	1	₹28 crore (US$3.3 million)	₹28 crore (US$3.3 million)	₹62 crore (US$7.3 million)
Bangalore	3	1	₹33 crore (US$3.9 million)	₹33 crore (US$3.9 million)	₹57 crore (US$6.7 million)
Hyderabad	3	1	₹22 crore (US$2.6 million)	₹22 crore (US$2.6 million)	₹68 crore (US$8.0 million)
Maximum overseas players: 8; Squad size- Min:18 and Max:25; Budget:₹90 Crore

== Auction ==
The auction was conducted on 12 and 13 February 2022 in Bengaluru. A total of 600 players were selected for the auction. Prominent players like Aaron Finch, Martin Guptill, Suresh Raina, Shakib al Hasan, Eoin Morgan, Amit Mishra, Ishant Sharma and Andrew Tye went unsold.

=== Sold players ===
S.No.	Set No.	Set	Name	Country	Playing Role	IPL Matches	Capped / Uncapped / Associate	Base Price (in ₹ Lacs)	IPL 2022 Team	Auctioned Price (in ₹ Lacs)	IPL 2021 Team	Previous IPL Team(s)
1	1	M	Shikhar Dhawan	India	Batter	192	Capped	200	Punjab Kings	825	DC	MI, DCH, SRH, DC
2	1	M	Ravichandran Ashwin	India	All Rounder	167	Capped	200	Rajasthan Royals	500	DC	CSK, RPS, PBKS, DC
3	1	M	Pat Cummins	Australia	All Rounder	37	Capped	200	Kolkata Knight Riders	725	KKR	DC, MI, KKR
4	1	M	Kagiso Rabada	South Africa	Bowler	50	Capped	200	Punjab Kings	925	DC	DC
5	1	M	Trent Boult	New Zealand	Bowler	62	Capped	200	Rajasthan Royals	800	MI	SRH, KKR, DC, MI
6	1	M	Shreyas Iyer	India	Batter	87	Capped	200	Kolkata Knight Riders	1225	DC	DC
7	1	M	Mohammed Shami	India	Bowler	77	Capped	200	Gujarat Titans	625	PBKS	KKR, DC, PBKS
8	1	M	Faf du Plessis	South Africa	Batter	100	Capped	200	Royal Challengers Bangalore	700	CSK	CSK, RPS
9	1	M	Quinton de Kock	South Africa	Wicket Keeper Batter	77	Capped	200	Lucknow Super Giants	675	MI	SRH, DC, RCB, MI
10	1	M	David Warner	Australia	Batter	150	Capped	200	Delhi Capitals	625	SRH	DC, SRH
11	2	BA1	Manish Pandey	India	Batter	154	Capped	150	Lucknow Super Giants	460	SRH	MI, RCB, PWI, KKR, SRH
12	2	BA1	Shimron Hetmyer	West Indies	Batter	31	Capped	150	Rajasthan Royals	850	DC	RCB, DC
13	2	BA1	Robin Uthappa	India	Batter	193	Capped	200	Chennai Super Kings	200	CSK	MI, RCB, PWI, KKR, RR, CSK
14	2	BA1	Jason Roy	England	Batter	13	Capped	200	Gujarat Titans	200	SRH	GL, DC, SRH
15	2	BA1	Devdutt Padikkal	India	Batter	332	Capped	150	Rajasthan Royals	775	RCB	RCB
16	3	AL1	Dwayne Bravo	West Indies	All Rounder	151	Capped	150	Chennai Super Kings	440	CSK	MI, GL, CSK
17	3	AL1	Nitish Rana	India	All Rounder	77	Capped	150	Kolkata Knight Riders	800	KKR	MI, KKR
18	3	AL1	Jason Holder	West Indies	All Rounder	26	Capped	150	Lucknow Super Giants	875	SRH	CSK, KKR, SRH
19	3	AL1	Harshal Patel	India	All Rounder	63	Capped	150	Royal Challengers Bangalore	1075	RCB	MI, DC, RCB
20	3	AL1	Deepak Hooda	India	All Rounder	80	Capped	75	Lucknow Super Giants	575	PBKS	RR, SRH, PBKS
21	3	AL1	Wanindu Hasaranga	Sri Lanka	Right Handed Batter	2	Capped	100	Royal Challengers Bangalore	1075	RCB	RCB
22	3	AL1	Washington Sundar	India	All Rounder	42	Capped	150	Sunrisers Hyderabad	875	RCB	RPS, RCB
23	3	AL1	Krunal Pandya	India	All Rounder	84	Capped	200	Lucknow Super Giants	825	MI	MI
24	3	AL1	Mitchell Marsh	Australia	All Rounder	21	Capped	200	Delhi Capitals	650	SRH	DCH, PWI, RPS, SRH
25	3	BA1	Ambati Rayudu	India	Wicket Keeper Batter	175	Capped	200	Chennai Super Kings	675	CSK	CSK
26	4	WK1	Ishan Kishan	India	Wicket Keeper Batter	61	Capped	150	Mumbai Indians	1525	MI	GL, MI
27	4	WK1	Jonny Bairstow	England	Wicket Keeper Batter	28	Capped	100	Punjab Kings	675	SRH	SRH
28	4	WK1	Dinesh Karthik	India	Wicket Keepe	213	Capped	200	Royal Challengers Bangalore	550	KKR	DC, PBKS, MI, RCB, GL, KKR
29	4	WK1	Nicholas Pooran	West Indies	Wicket Keeper Batter	33	Capped	150	Sunrisers Hyderabad	1075	PBKS	MI, PBKS
30	5	FA1	T. Natarajan	India	Bowler	24	Capped	100	Sunrisers Hyderabad	400	SRH	PBKS, SRH
31	5	FA1	Deepak Chahar	India	Bowler	63	Capped	200	Chennai Super Kings	1400	CSK	RPS, CSK
32	5	FA1	Prasidh Krishna	India	Bowler	34	Capped	100	Rajasthan Royals	1000	KKR	KKR
33	5	FA1	Lockie Ferguson	New Zealand	Bowler	22	Capped	200	Gujarat Titans	1000	KKR	RPS, KKR
34	5	FA1	Josh Hazlewood	Australia	Bowler	12	Capped	150	Royal Challengers Bangalore	775	CSK	MI, CSK
35	5	FA1	Mark Wood	England	Bowler	1	Capped	200	Lucknow Super Giants	750		CSK
36	5	FA1	Bhuvneshwar Kumar	India	Bowler	132	Capped	200	Sunrisers Hyderabad	420	SRH	RCB, PWI, SRH
37	5	FA1	Shardul Thakur	India	Bowler	61	Capped	200	Delhi Capitals	1075	CSK	PBKS, RPS, CSK
38	5	FA1	Mustafizur Rahman	Bangladesh	Bowler	38	Capped	200	Delhi Capitals	200	RR	SRH, MI, RR
39	6	SP1	Kuldeep Yadav	India	Bowler	45	Capped	100	Delhi Capitals	200	KKR	MI, KKR
40	6	SP1	Rahul Chahar	India	Bowler	42	Capped	75	Punjab Kings	525	MI	RPS, MI
41	6	SP1	Yuzvendra Chahal	India	Bowler	114	Capped	200	Rajasthan Royals	650	RCB	MI, RCB
42	7	UBA1	Priyam Garg	India	Batter	19	Uncapped	20	Sunrisers Hyderabad	20	SRH	SRH
43	7	UBA1	Abhinav Manohar Sadarangani	India	Batter		Uncapped	20	Gujarat Titans	260		
44	7	UBA1	Dewald Brevis	South Africa	Batter		Uncapped	20	Mumbai Indians	300		
45	7	UBA1	Ashwin Hebbar	India	Batter		Uncapped	20	Delhi Capitals	20		
46	7	UBA1	Rahul Tripathi	India	Batter	62	Uncapped	40	Sunrisers Hyderabad	850	KKR	RPS, RR, KKR
47	8	UAL1	Riyan Parag	India	All Rounder	30	Uncapped	30	Rajasthan Royals	380	RR	RR
48	8	UAL1	Abhishek Sharma	India	All Rounder	22	Uncapped	20	Sunrisers Hyderabad	650	SRH	DC, SRH
49	8	UAL1	Sarfaraz Khan	India	All Rounder	40	Uncapped	20	Delhi Capitals	20	PBKS	RCB, PBKS
50	8	UAL1	M. Shahrukh Khan	India	All Rounder	11	Uncapped	40	Punjab Kings	900	PBKS	PBKS
51	8	UAL1	Shivam Mavi	India	All Rounder	26	Uncapped	40	Kolkata Knight Riders	725	KKR	KKR
52	8	UAL1	Rahul Tewatia	India	All Rounder	48	Uncapped	40	Gujarat Titans	900	RR	PBKS, DC, RR
53	8	UAL1	Kamlesh Nagarkoti	India	All Rounder	11	Uncapped	40	Delhi Capitals	110	KKR	KKR
54	8	UAL1	Harpreet Brar	India	All Rounder	10	Uncapped	20	Punjab Kings	380	PBKS	PBKS
55	8	UAL1	Shahbaz Ahmed	India	All Rounder	13	Uncapped	30	Royal Challengers Bangalore	240	RCB	RCB
56	9	UWK1	K. S. Bharat	India	Wicket Keeper Batter	8	Uncapped	20	Delhi Capitals	200	RCB	DC, RCB
57	9	UWK1	Anuj Rawat	India	Wicket Keeper Batter	2	Uncapped	20	Royal Challengers Bangalore	340	RR	RR
58	9	UWK1	Prabhsimran Singh	India	Wicket Keeper Batter	5	Uncapped	20	Punjab Kings	60	PBKS	PBKS
59	9	UWK1	Sheldon Jackson	India	Wicket Keeper Batter	4	Uncapped	30	Kolkata Knight Riders	60	KKR	RCB, KKR
60	9	UWK1	Jitesh Sharma	India	Wicket Keeper Batter		Uncapped	20	Punjab Kings	20		MI
61	10	UFA1	Basil Thampi	India	Bowler	20	Uncapped	30	Mumbai Indians	30	SRH	GL, SRH
62	10	UFA1	Kartik Tyagi	India	Bowler	14	Uncapped	20	Sunrisers Hyderabad	400	RR	RR
63	10	UFA1	Akash Deep	India	Bowler		Uncapped	20	Royal Challengers Bangalore	20	RCB	RCB
64	10	UFA1	KM Asif	India	Bowler	3	Uncapped	20	Chennai Super Kings	20	CSK	CSK
65	10	UFA1	Avesh Khan	India	Bowler	25	Uncapped	20	Lucknow Super Giants	1000	DC	RCB, DC
66	10	UFA1	Ishan Porel	India	Bowler	1	Uncapped	20	Punjab Kings	25	PBKS	PBKS
67	10	UFA1	Tushar Deshpande	India	Bowler	5	Uncapped	20	Chennai Super Kings	20		DC
68	10	UFA1	Ankit Rajpoot	India	Bowler	29	Uncapped	20	Lucknow Super Giants	50		CSK, KKR, PBKS, RR
69	11	USP1	Noor Ahmad	Afghanistan	Bowler		Uncapped	30	Gujarat Titans	30		
70	11	USP1	Murugan Ashwin	India	Bowler	34	Uncapped	20	Mumbai Indians	160	PBKS	RPS, DC, RCB, PBKS
71	11	USP1	K. C. Cariappa	India	Bowler	11	Uncapped	20	Rajasthan Royals	30	RR	KKR, PBKS, RR
72	11	USP1	Shreyas Gopal	India	Bowler	48	Uncapped	20	Sunrisers Hyderabad	75	RR	MI, RR
73	11	USP1	Jagadeesha Suchith	India	Bowler	17	Uncapped	20	Sunrisers Hyderabad	20	SRH	MI, DC, PBKS, SRH
74	11	USP1	Ravisrinivasan Sai Kishore	India	Bowler		Uncapped	20	Gujarat Titans	300	CSK	CSK
75	12	BA2	Aiden Markram	South Africa	Batter	6	Capped	100	Sunrisers Hyderabad	260	PBKS	PBKS
76	12	BA2	Ajinkya Rahane	India	Batter	151	Capped	100	Kolkata Knight Riders	100	DC	MI, RPS, RR, DC
77	12	BA2	Mandeep Singh	India	Batter	105	Capped	50	Delhi Capitals	110	PBKS	RCB, KKR, PBKS
78	13	AL2	Liam Livingstone	England	All Rounder	9	Capped	100	Punjab Kings	1150	RR	RR
79	13	AL2	Dominic Drakes	West Indies	All Rounder		Capped	75	Gujarat Titans	110	CSK	CSK
80	13	AL2	Jayant Yadav	India	All Rounder	19	Capped	100	Gujarat Titans	170	MI	DC, MI
81	13	AL2	Vijay Shankar	India	All Rounder	47	Capped	50	Gujarat Titans	140	SRH	CSK, DC, SRH
82	13	AL2	Odean Smith	West Indies	All Rounder		Capped	100	Punjab Kings	600		
83	13	AL2	Marco Jansen	South Africa	All Rounder	2	Capped	50	Sunrisers Hyderabad	420	MI	MI
84	13	AL2	Shivam Dube	India	All Rounder	24	Capped	50	Chennai Super Kings	400	RR	RCB, RR
85	13	AL2	Krishnappa Gowtham	India	All Rounder	24	Capped	50	Lucknow Super Giants	90	CSK	MI, RR, PBKS, CSK
86	14	FA2	Khaleel Ahmed	India	Bowler	24	Capped	50	Delhi Capitals	525	SRH	DC, SRH
87	14	FA2	Dushmantha Chameera	Sri Lanka	Bowler		Capped	50	Lucknow Super Giants	200	RCB	RR, RCB
88	14	FA2	Chetan Sakariya	India	Bowler	14	Capped	50	Delhi Capitals	420	RR	RR
89	14	FA2	Sandeep Sharma	India	Bowler	99	Capped	50	Punjab Kings	50	SRH	PBKS, SRH
90	14	FA2	Navdeep Saini	India	Bowler	28	Capped	75	Rajasthan Royals	260	RCB	DC, RCB
91	14	FA2	Jaydev Unadkat	India	Bowler	86	Capped	75	Mumbai Indians	130	RR	KKR, DC, RCB, RPS, RR
92	15	SP2	Mayank Markande	India	Bowler	18	Capped	50	Mumbai Indians	65	RR	MI, RR
93	15	SP2	Shahbaz Nadeem	India	Bowler	72	Capped	50	Lucknow Super Giants	50	SRH	DC, SRH
94	15	SP2	Maheesh Theekshana	Sri Lanka	Bowler		Capped	50	Chennai Super Kings	70		
95	16	UBA2	Rinku Singh	India	Batter	11	Uncapped	20	Kolkata Knight Riders	55	KKR	PBKS, KKR
96	16	UBA2	Manan Vohra	India	Batter	53	Uncapped	20	Lucknow Super Giants	20	RR	PBKS, RCB, RR
97	17	UAL2	Lalit Yadav	India	All Rounder	7	Uncapped	20	Delhi Capitals	65	DC	DC
98	17	UAL2	Ripal Patel	India	All Rounder	2	Uncapped	20	Delhi Capitals	20	DC	DC
99	17	UAL2	Yash Dhull	India	All Rounder		Uncapped	20	Delhi Capitals	50		
100	17	UAL2	Tilak Varma	India	All Rounder		Uncapped	20	Mumbai Indians	170		
101	17	UAL2	Mahipal Lomror	India	All Rounder	11	Uncapped	40	Royal Challengers Bangalore	95	RR	DC, RR
102	17	UAL2	Anukul Roy	India	All Rounder	1	Uncapped	20	Kolkata Knight Riders	20	MI	MI
103	17	UAL2	Darshan Nalkande	India	All Rounder		Uncapped	20	Gujarat Titans	20	PBKS	PBKS
104	17	UAL2	R. Sanjay Yadav	India	All Rounder		Uncapped	20	Mumbai Indians	50		KKR, SRH
105	17	UAL2	Raj Bawa	India	All Rounder		Uncapped	20	Punjab Kings	200		
106	17	UAL2	Rajvardhan Hangargekar	India	All Rounder		Uncapped	30	Chennai Super Kings	150		
107	18	UFA2	Yash Dayal	India	Bowler		Uncapped	20	Gujarat Titans	320		
108	18	UFA2	Simarjeet Singh	India	Bowler		Uncapped	20	Chennai Super Kings	20	MI	MI
109	19	BA3	Finn Allen	New Zealand	Batter		Capped	50	Royal Challengers Bangalore	80	RCB	RCB
110	19	BA3	Devon Conway	New Zealand	Batter		Capped	100	Chennai Super Kings	100		
111	19	BA3	Rovman Powell	West Indies	Batter		Capped	75	Delhi Capitals	280		KKR
112	20	AL3	Jofra Archer	England	All Rounder	35	Capped	200	Mumbai Indians	800	RR	RR
113	20	AL3	Rishi Dhawan	India	All Rounder	26	Capped	50	Punjab Kings	55		MI, PBKS, KKR
114	20	AL3	Dwaine Pretorius	South Africa	All Rounder		Capped	50	Chennai Super Kings	50		
115	20	AL3	Sherfane Rutherford	West Indies	All Rounder	7	Capped	100	Royal Challengers Bangalore	100	SRH	DC, MI, SRH
116	20	AL3	Daniel Sams	Australia	All Rounder	5	Capped	100	Mumbai Indians	260	RCB	DC, RCB
117	20	AL3	Mitchell Santner	New Zealand	All Rounder	6	Capped	100	Chennai Super Kings	190	CSK	CSK
118	20	AL3	Romario Shepherd	West Indies	All Rounder		Capped	75	Sunrisers Hyderabad	775		
119	22	FA3	Jason Behrendorff	Australia	Bowler	5	Capped	75	Royal Challengers Bangalore	75	CSK	MI, CSK
120	22	FA3	Obed McCoy	West Indies	Bowler		Capped	75	Rajasthan Royals	75		
121	22	FA3	Tymal Mills	England	Bowler	5	Capped	100	Mumbai Indians	150		RCB
122	22	FA3	Adam Milne	New Zealand	Bowler	9	Capped	150	Chennai Super Kings	190	MI	RCB, MI
123	24	UBA3	Subhranshu Senapati	India	Batter		Uncapped	20	Chennai Super Kings	20		
124	25	UAL3	Tim David	Australia	Batter	1	Capped	40	Mumbai Indians	825	RCB	RCB
125	25	UAL3	Pravin Dubey	India	All Rounder	3	Uncapped	20	Delhi Capitals	50	DC	RCB, DC
126	25	UAL3	Prerak Mankad	India	All Rounder		Uncapped	20	Punjab Kings	20		
127	25	UAL3	Suyash Prabhudessai	India	All Rounder		Uncapped	20	Royal Challengers Bangalore	30	RCB	RCB
128	27	UFA1	Vaibhav Arora	India	Bowler		Uncapped	20	Punjab Kings	200	KKR	KKR
129	27	UFA1	Mukesh Choudhary	India	Bowler		Uncapped	20	Chennai Super Kings	20		
130	27	UFA1	Rasikh Salam Dar	India	Bowler	1	Uncapped	20	Kolkata Knight Riders	20		MI
131	27	UFA1	Mohsin Khan	India	Bowler		Uncapped	20	Lucknow Super Giants	20	MI	MI
132	27	UFA1	Chama Milind	India	Bowler		Uncapped	20	Royal Challengers Bangalore	25		SRH, DC
133	28	USP2	Prashant Solanki	India	Bowler		Uncapped	20	Chennai Super Kings	120		
134	^{[ACC-1]}		Sean Abbott	Australia	All Rounder	2	Capped	20	Sunrisers Hyderabad	240		RCB
135	^{[ACC-1]}		Alzarri Joseph	West Indies	Bowler	3	Capped	75	Gujarat Titans	240		MI
136	^{[ACC-1]}		Riley Meredith	Australia	Bowler	5	Capped	100	Mumbai Indians	100	PBKS	PBKS
137	^{[ACC-1]}		Ayush Badoni	India	Batter		Uncapped	20	Lucknow Super Giants	20		
138	^{[ACC-1]}		Aneeshwar Gautam	India	All Rounder		Uncapped	100	Royal Challengers Bangalore	100		
139	^{[ACC-1]}		Baba Indrajith	India	Wicket Keeper Batter		Uncapped	20	Kolkata Knight Riders	20		
140	^{[ACC-1]}		Chamika Karunaratne	Sri Lanka	All Rounder		Capped	50	Kolkata Knight Riders	50		
141	^{[ACC-1]}		Ravikumar Samarth	India	Batter		Uncapped	20	Sunrisers Hyderabad	20		
142	^{[ACC-1]}		Abhijeet Tomar	India	Batter		Uncapped	20	Kolkata Knight Riders	40		
143	^{[ACC-1]}		Pradeep Sangwan	India	Bowler	39	Uncapped	20	Gujarat Titans	20		DC, KKR, GL, MI
144	^{[ACC-1]}		Writtick Chatterjee	India	All Rounder		Uncapped	20	Punjab Kings	20		
145	^{[ACC-1]}		Pratham Singh	India	Batter		Uncapped	20	Kolkata Knight Riders	20		GL
146	^{[ACC-1]}		Shashank Singh	India	All Rounder		Uncapped	20	Sunrisers Hyderabad	20		DC, RR
147	^{[ACC-1]}		Kyle Mayers	West Indies	All Rounder		Capped	50	Lucknow Super Giants	50		
148	^{[ACC-1]}		Karan Sharma	India	All Rounder		Uncapped	20	Lucknow Super Giants	20		
149	^{[ACC-1]}		Baltej Singh	India	Bowler		Uncapped	20	Punjab Kings	20		
150	^{[ACC-1]}		Saurabh Dubey	India	Bowler		Uncapped	20	Sunrisers Hyderabad	20		
151	^{[ACC-1]}		Mohammed Arshad Khan	India	Bowler		Uncapped	20	Mumbai Indians	20		
152	^{[ACC-1]}		Ansh Patel	India	All Rounder		Uncapped	20	Punjab Kings	20		
153	^{[ACC-1]}		Ashok Sharma	India	Bowler		Uncapped	20	Kolkata Knight Riders	50		
154	^{[ACC-2]}		Anunay Singh	India	Bowler		Uncapped	20	Rajasthan Royals	20		
155	^{[ACC-2]}		David Miller	South Africa	Batter	89	Capped	100	Gujarat Titans	300	RR	PBKS, RR
156	^{[ACC-2]}		Sam Billings	England	Wicket Keeper Batter	22	Capped	200	Kolkata Knight Riders	200	DC	CSK, DC
157	^{[ACC-2]}		Wriddhiman Saha	India	Wicket Keeper Batter	133	Capped	100	Gujarat Titans	190	SRH	KKR, CSK, PBKS, SRH
158	^{[ACC-2]}		Matthew Wade	Australia	Wicket Keeper Batter	3	Capped	200	Gujarat Titans	240		DC
159	^{[ACC-2]}		C. Hari Nishanth	India	Batter		Uncapped	20	Chennai Super Kings	20	CSK	CSK
160	^{[ACC-2]}		Anmolpreet Singh	India	Batter	1	Uncapped	20	Mumbai Indians	20	MI	MI
161	^{[ACC-2]}		Narayan Jagadeesan	India	Wicket Keeper Batter	5	Uncapped	20	Chennai Super Kings	20	CSK	CSK
162	^{[ACC-2]}		Vishnu Vinod	India	Wicket Keeper Batter	3	Uncapped	20	Sunrisers Hyderabad	50	DC	RCB, DC
163	^{[ACC-2]}		Chris Jordan	England	Bowler	24	Capped	200	Chennai Super Kings	360	PBKS	RCB, SRH, PBKS
164	^{[ACC-2]}		Lungi Ngidi	South Africa	Bowler	14	Capped	50	Delhi Capitals	50	CSK	CSK
165	^{[ACC-2]}		Karn Sharma	India	Bowler	68	Capped	50	Royal Challengers Bangalore	50	CSK	RCB, SRH, MI, CSK
166	^{[ACC-2]}		Kuldeep Sen	India	Bowler		Uncapped	20	Rajasthan Royals	20		
167	^{[ACC-2]}		Alex Hales	England	Batter	6	Capped	150	Kolkata Knight Riders	150		MI, SRH
168	^{[ACC-2]}		Evin Lewis	West Indies	Batter	21	Capped	200	Lucknow Super Giants	200	RR	MI, RR
169	^{[ACC-2]}		Karun Nair	India	Batter	73	Capped	50	Rajasthan Royals	140	KKR	RCB, RR, DC, PBKS, KKR
170	^{[ACC-2]}		Glenn Phillips	New Zealand	Wicket Keeper Batter	3	Capped	150	Sunrisers Hyderabad	150	RR	RR
171	^{[ACC-2]}		Tim Seifert	New Zealand	Wicket Keeper Batter	1	Capped	50	Delhi Capitals	50	KKR	KKR
172	^{[ACC-2]}		Nathan Ellis	Australia	Bowler	3	Capped	75	Punjab Kings	75	PBKS	PBKS
173	^{[ACC-2]}		Fazalhaq Farooqi	Afghanistan	Bowler		Capped	50	Sunrisers Hyderabad	50		
174	^{[ACC-2]}		Ramandeep Singh	India	Batter		Uncapped	20	Mumbai Indians	20		
175	^{[ACC-2]}		Atharva Taide	India	All Rounder		Uncapped	20	Punjab Kings	20		
176	^{[ACC-2]}		Dhruv Jurel	India	Wicket Keeper Batter		Uncapped	20	Rajasthan Royals	20		
177	^{[ACC-2]}		Mayank Yadav	India	Bowler		Uncapped	20	Lucknow Super Giants	20		
178	^{[ACC-2]}		Tejas Baroka	India	Bowler	1	Uncapped	20	Rajasthan Royals	20		GL
179	^{[ACC-2]}		Bhanuka Rajapaksa	Sri Lanka	Batter		Capped	50	Punjab Kings	50		
180	^{[ACC-2]}		Gurkeerat Singh	India	Batter	41	Capped	50	Gujarat Titans	50	KKR	PBKS, DC, RCB, KKR
181	^{[ACC-2]}		Tim Southee	New Zealand	Bowler	43	Capped	150	Kolkata Knight Riders	150	KKR	CSK, RR, MI, RCB, KKR
182	^{[ACC-2]}		Rahul Buddhi	India	Batter		Uncapped	20	Mumbai Indians	20		
183	^{[ACC-2]}		Benny Howell	England	All Rounder		Uncapped	40	Punjab Kings	40		
184	^{[ACC-2]}		Kuldip Yadav	India	Bowler	1	Uncapped	20	Rajasthan Royals	20	RR	RR
185	^{[ACC-2]}		Varun Aaron	India	Bowler	50	Capped	50	Gujarat Titans	50		DC, RCB, PBKS, RR
186	^{[ACC-2]}		Ramesh Kumar	India	Bowler		Uncapped	20	Kolkata Knight Riders	20		
187	^{[ACC-2]}		Hrithik Shokeen	India	All Rounder		Uncapped	20	Mumbai Indians	20		
188	^{[ACC-2]}		K. Bhagath Varma	India	All Rounder		Uncapped	20	Chennai Super Kings	20	CSK	CSK
189	^{[ACC-2]}		Arjun Tendulkar	India	All Rounder		Uncapped	20	Mumbai Indians	30	MI	MI
190	^{[ACC-2]}		Shubham Garhwal	India	All Rounder		Uncapped	20	Rajasthan Royals	20		
191	^{[ACC-3]}		Mohammad Nabi	Afghanistan	All Rounder	17	Capped	100	Kolkata Knight Riders	100	SRH	SRH
192	^{[ACC-3]}		Umesh Yadav	India	Bowler	121	Capped	200	Kolkata Knight Riders	200	DC	DC, KKR, RCB
193	^{[ACC-3]}		James Neesham	New Zealand	All Rounder	12	Capped	150	Rajasthan Royals	150	MI	DC, KKR, PBKS, MI
194	^{[ACC-3]}		Nathan Coulter-Nile	Australia	All Rounder	38	Capped	200	Rajasthan Royals	200	MI	DC, KKR, RCB, MI
195	^{[ACC-3]}		Vicky Ostwal	India	Bowler		Uncapped	20	Delhi Capitals	20		
196	^{[ACC-3]}		Rassie van der Dussen	South Africa	Batter		Capped	100	Rajasthan Royals	100		
197	^{[ACC-3]}		Daryl Mitchell	New Zealand	All Rounder		Capped	75	Rajasthan Royals	75		
198	^{[ACC-3]}		Siddharth Kaul	India	Bowler	54	Capped	75	Royal Challengers Bangalore	75	SRH	KKR, DC, SRH
199	^{[ACC-3]}		B. Sai Sudharshan	India	Batter		Uncapped	20	Gujarat Titans	20		
200	^{[ACC-3]}		Aryan Juyal	India	Wicket Keeper Batter		Uncapped	20	Mumbai Indians	20		
201	^{[ACC-3]}		Luvnith Sisodia	India	Wicket Keeper Batter		Uncapped	20	Royal Challengers Bangalore	20		
202	^{[ACC-3]}		Fabian Allen	West Indies	All Rounder	4	Capped	75	Mumbai Indians	75	PBKS	SRH, PBKS
203	^{[ACC-3]}		David Willey	England	All Rounder	3	Capped	200	Royal Challengers Bangalore	200		CSK
204	^{[ACC-3]}		Aman Khan	India	All Rounder		Uncapped	20	Kolkata Knight Riders	20		

^{ACC} ACC-1/2/3: Players who were part of accelerated bidding.

== Withdrawn players ==
Player	Team	Auctioned/Retention Price	Reason	Withdrawal Announcement date	Replacement Player	Replacement Player's Price	Replacement Player's Base Price	Signing date	Ref.
Jason Roy	Gujarat Titans	₹2 crore (US$240,000)	Personal Reasons	28 February 2022	Rahmanullah Gurbaz	₹50 lakh (US$59,000)	₹50 lakh (US$59,000)	8 March 2022	
Alex Hales	Kolkata Knight Riders	₹1.5 crore (US$180,000)	Personal Reasons	11 March 2022	Aaron Finch	₹1.5 crore (US$180,000)	₹1.5 crore (US$180,000)	11 March 2022	
Mark Wood	Lucknow Super Giants	₹7.5 crore (US$890,000)	Elbow Injury	18 March 2022	Andrew Tye	₹1.5 crore (US$180,000)	₹1.5 crore (US$180,000)	23 March 2022	
Luvnith Sisodia	Royal Challengers Bangalore	₹20 lakh (US$24,000)	Injury	3 April 2022	Rajat Patidar	₹20 lakh (US$24,000)	₹20 lakh (US$24,000)	3 April 2022	
Nathan Coulter-Nile	Rajasthan Royals	₹2 crore (US$240,000)	Calf injury	6 April 2022	Corbin Bosch	₹20 lakh (US$24,000)	₹20 lakh (US$24,000)	14 May 2022	
Deepak Chahar	Chennai Super Kings	₹14 crore (US$1.7 million)	Back Injury	15 April 2022					
Rasikh Salam	Kolkata Knight Riders	₹20 lakh (US$24,000)	Lower Back Injury	15 April 2022	Harshit Rana	₹20 lakh (US$24,000)	₹20 lakh (US$24,000)	15 April 2022	
Adam Milne	Chennai Super Kings	₹1.9 crore (US$220,000)	Hamstring Injury	21 April 2022	Matheesha Pathirana	₹20 lakh (US$24,000)	₹20 lakh (US$24,000)	21 April 2022	
Arshad Khan	Mumbai Indians	₹20 lakh (US$24,000)	Injury	28 April 2022	Kumar Kartikeya Singh	₹20 lakh (US$24,000)	₹20 lakh (US$24,000)	28 April 2022	
Saurabh Dubey	Sunrisers Hyderabad	₹20 lakh (US$24,000)	Back Injury	4 May 2022	Sushant Mishra	₹20 lakh (US$24,000)	₹20 lakh (US$24,000)	4 May 2022	
Tymal Mills	Mumbai Indians	₹1.5 crore (US$180,000)	Injury	5 May 2022	Tristan Stubbs	₹20 lakh (US$24,000)	₹20 lakh (US$24,000)	5 May 2022	
Chamika Karunaratne	Kolkata Knight Riders	₹50 lakh (US$59,000)	International Duty	8 May 2022					
Suryakumar Yadav	Mumbai Indians	₹8 crore (US$950,000)	Left Forearm Muscle Injury	9 May 2022	Akash Madhwal	₹20 lakh (US$24,000)	₹20 lakh (US$24,000)	16 May 2022	
Ravindra Jadeja	Chennai Super Kings	₹16 crore (US$1.9 million)	Bruised Rib	11 May 2022					
Pat Cummins	Kolkata Knight Riders	₹7.25 crore (US$860,000)	Hip Injury	13 May 2022					
Ajinkya Rahane	Kolkata Knight Riders	₹1 crore (US$120,000)	Hamstring Injury	16 May 2022					
Kane Williamson	Sunrisers Hyderabad	₹14 crore (US$1.7 million)	Personal Reasons	18 May 2022					
Daryl Mitchell	Rajasthan Royals	₹75 lakh (US$89,000)	International Duty	25 May 2022					

== Support staff changes ==
Team	Staff	Change	Role	Announcement date	Note	Ref
Chennai Super Kings						
Delhi Capitals	Mohammad Kaif	Parted ways	Assistant coach		Replaced by Biju George	
Delhi Capitals	Ajay Ratra	Parted ways	Assistant coach		Replaced by Ajit Agarkar	
Delhi Capitals	Ajit Agarkar	Appointed	Assistant coach	23 February 2022	Replaced Ajay Ratra	
Delhi Capitals	Shane Watson	Appointed	Assistant coach	15 March 2022		
Delhi Capitals	Biju George	Appointed	Fielding coach	9 March 2022	Replaced Mohammad Kaif	
Gujarat Titans	Ashish Nehra	Appointed	Head coach	3 January 2022		
Gujarat Titans	Vikram Solanki	Appointed	Director of cricket	3 January 2022		
Gujarat Titans	Gary Kirsten	Appointed	Batting coach and mentor	3 January 2022		
Gujarat Titans	Aashish Kapoor	Appointed	Spin bowling coach and scout	26 January 2022		
Gujarat Titans	Mithun Manhas	Appointed	Fielding coach	March 2022		
Gujarat Titans	Abdul Naim	Appointed		March 2022		
Kolkata Knight Riders	Kyle Mills	Parted ways	Bowling coach	14 January 2022	Replaced by Bharat Arun	
Kolkata Knight Riders	Bharat Arun	Appointed	Bowling coach	14 January 2022	Replaced Kyle Mills	
Kolkata Knight Riders	Pravin Tambe	Appointed	Spin Bowling Consultant	14 January 2022		
Lucknow Super Giants	Andy Flower	Appointed	Head coach	17 December 2021		
Lucknow Super Giants	Gautam Gambhir	Appointed	Mentor	18 December 2021		
Lucknow Super Giants	Vijay Dahiya	Appointed	Assistant coach	22 December 2021		
Lucknow Super Giants	Andy Bichel	Appointed	Bowling coach	11 March 2022		
Lucknow Super Giants	Richard Halsall	Appointed	Fielding coach	March 2022		
Lucknow Super Giants	James Pipe	Appointed	Physiotherapist	March 2022		
Lucknow Super Giants	Warren Andrews	Appointed	Strength and Conditioning Coach	22 December 2021		
Mumbai Indians						
Punjab Kings	Andy Flower	Parted ways	Assistant coach	1 December 2021	Replaced by Julian Wood	
Punjab Kings	Vinayak Samant	Appointed	Talent scout	December 2021		
Punjab Kings	Vinayak Mane	Appointed	Talent scout	December 2021		
Punjab Kings	Wasim Jaffer	Parted ways	Batting coach	10 February 2022	Replaced by Jonty Rhodes	
Punjab Kings	Jonty Rhodes	Took up additional role of batting coach	Fielding coach	15 February 2022	Replaced Wasim Jaffer	
Punjab Kings	Julian Wood	Appointed	Assistant coach and Batting consultant	14 March 2022	Replaced Andy Flower	
Rajasthan Royals	Steffan Jones	Appointed	High-performance fast bowling coach	4 March 2022		
Rajasthan Royals	Rob Cassell	Parted ways	Bowling coach	4 March 2022		
Rajasthan Royals	Lasith Malinga	Appointed	Fast-bowling coach	11 March 2022	Replaced Rob Cassell	
Rajasthan Royals	Paddy Upton	Appointed	Team Catalyst	11 March 2022		
Royal Challengers Bangalore	Sanjay Bangar	Role changed from Batting consultant	Head coach	30 November 2021	Replaced Simon Katich	
Royal Challengers Bangalore	Mike Hesson	Role changed from Head Coach	Director of Cricket Operations	30 November 2021		
Royal Challengers Bangalore	Mithun Manhas	Parted ways	Assistant coach	March 2022		
Sunrisers Hyderabad	Trevor Bayliss	Parted ways	Head coach	1 December 2021		
Sunrisers Hyderabad	Brad Haddin	Parted ways	Assistant coach	1 December 2021		
Sunrisers Hyderabad	VVS Laxman	Parted ways	Mentor	1 December 2021		
Sunrisers Hyderabad	Tom Moody	Role changed from Director of cricket	Head coach	23 December 2021	Replaced Trevor Bayliss	
Sunrisers Hyderabad	Simon Katich	Appointed	Assistant coach	23 December 2021	Replaced Brad Haddin	
Sunrisers Hyderabad	Dale Steyn	Appointed	Pace bowling coach	23 December 2021		
Sunrisers Hyderabad	Brian Lara	Appointed	Strategic advisor and batting coach	23 December 2021	Replaced VVS Laxman	
Sunrisers Hyderabad	Hemang Badani	Appointed	Fielding coach and talent scout	23 December 2021		
Sunrisers Hyderabad	Muttiah Muralitharan	Role changed from Bowling coach	Strategy and spin bowling coach	23 December 2021		
Sunrisers Hyderabad	Simon Katich	Parted ways	Assistant coach	18 February 2022	Replaced by Simon Helmot	
Sunrisers Hyderabad	Simon Helmot	Appointed	Assistant coach	18 February 2022	Replaced Simon Katich	
