= Ravi Teja (disambiguation) =

Ravi Teja (born 1968) is an Indian actor.

Ravi Teja may also refer to:

- Ravi Teja (cricketer), Indian cricketer (born 1994)
- Dwaraka Ravi Teja, India cricketer (born 1988)
