= Unnikrishnan Manukrishnan =

Indian cricketer

Personal information
- Born: 4 October 1988 (age 38); Manjummel, Kerala, India
- Batting: Left-handed
- Bowling: Left-arm medium-fast
- Role: Bowler

Domestic team information
- Years: Team
- 2011–present: Kerala
- First-class debut: 10 November 2011 Kerala v Services
- Last First-class: 17 February 2022 Kerala v Meghalaya
- List A debut: 16 February 2011 Kerala v Tamil Nadu
- Last List A: 22 December 2021 Kerala v Services

Career statistics
Competition	FC	List A	T20
Matches	13	18	36
Runs scored	216	112	67
Batting average	15.42	15.25	11.16
100s/50s	0/0	0/0	0/0
Top score	32*	31	21*
Balls bowled	1769	731	701
Wickets	33	12	37
Bowling average	21.97	48.50	44.33
5 wickets in innings	1	0	0
10 wickets in match	0	0	0
Best bowling	6/37	2/23	4/6
Catches/stumpings	2/0	4/0	12/–
- Source: ESPNcricinfo, 17 March 2022

Unnikrishnan Manukrishnan (born 4 October 1988) is an Indian cricketer who plays for Kerala in domestic cricket. He is a bowling all-rounder who bats left-handed and bowls left-arm medium-pace.

== Domestic career ==
Manukrishnan was born on 4 October 1988 in Manjummel, Kerala. He made his List A debut for Kerala on 16 February 2011 in the 2011-12 Vijay Hazare Trophy. He made his Twenty20 debut for Kerala on 16 October 2011 in the 2011-12 Syed Mushtaq Ali Trophy. He made his first-class debut for Kerala in the 2011–12 Ranji Trophy on 10 November 2011.

He was the third highest wicket-taker for Kerala in the 2012-13 Ranji Trophy with 17 wickets from 4 matches including a fifer against Tripura. He was the third highest wicket taker for Kerala in the 2013-14 Syed Mushtaq Ali Trophy with 9 wickets. He bowled a career-best spell of 4 wickets off 6 runs, helping Kerala successfully defend a low score of 101 against Bengal. He was Kerala's second highest wicket taker in the 2014-15 Syed Mushtaq Ali Trophy with 7 wickets. and continued to be their second most wicket taking bowler in the 2015-16 Syed Mushtaq Ali Trophy with 10 wickets.

He was the top wicket-keeper of the 2020–21 KCA President's Cup T20, representing the title-winners, KCA Royals. Following this performance, he was named in the Kerala squad to play the 2021-22 Syed Mushtaq Ali Trophy, returning to the side after 5 years. He took 6 wickets from six matches with a best bowling figure of 3/26 against Tamil Nadu in the quarter-finals.

He is an employee of AG's office and has played club cricket tournaments representing its cricket team.

In the Kerala Cricket League auction, Manu Krishan was signed by the Kochi Blue Tigers for ₹7 lakh.He was the second most expensive purchase in the auction.
