= Tanush Gusain =

Indian cricketer (born 2001)

Personal information
- Born: 7 February 2001 (age 25)
- Source: Cricinfo, 16 October 2019

Tanush Gusain (born 7 February 2001) is an Indian cricketer. He made his List A debut on 13 October 2019, for Uttarakhand in the 2019–20 Vijay Hazare Trophy. He made his Twenty20 debut on 8 November 2021, for Uttarakhand in the 2021–22 Syed Mushtaq Ali Trophy. He made his first-class debut on 24 February 2022, for Uttarakhand in the 2021–22 Ranji Trophy.
