= Abdul Ela Al Quraishi =

Indian cricketer (born 1997)

Personal information
- Full name: Abdul Ela Al Quraishi
- Born: 2 December 1997 (age 28)
- Batting: Left-handed
- Bowling: Right-arm off break

Domestic team information
- Years: Team
- 2020–present: Hyderabad
- Source: ESPNcricinfo, 8 November 2020

Abdul Ela Al Quraishi (born 2 December 1997) is an Indian cricketer. He made his Twenty20 debut for Hyderabad in the 2021–22 Syed Mushtaq Ali Trophy on 8 November 2021.
