= Kartikeya Kak =

Indian cricketer (born 1996)

Reddy Vasool
Personal information
- Born: 4 October 1996 (age 30); Hyderabad
- Batting: Right-handed
- Bowling: Right-arm medium
- Role: Bowler
- Source: ESPNcricinfo, 10 January 2021

Kartikeya Kak (born 4 October 1996) is an Indian cricketer. He made his Twenty20 debut on 10 January 2021, for Hyderabad in the 2020–21 Syed Mushtaq Ali Trophy.
