= Maharajkumar of Vizianagram's cricket team in India and Ceylon in 1930–31 =

International cricket tour

The Maharajkumar of Vizianagram (known as "Vizzy") created an international cricket team, including Jack Hobbs and Herbert Sutcliffe, to tour India and Ceylon from November 1930 to January 1931. They played a series of matches against leading or regional Indian and Ceylonese teams with nine of the games rated first-class by most cricket sources (see also Variations in published cricket statistics). "Vizzy" captained the team himself. Besides Hobbs and Sutcliffe, the team included future Indian Test players C. K. Nayudu and Syed Mushtaq Ali.
