= Parth Bhut =

Indian cricketer (born 1997)

Personal information
- Full name: Parth Rameshbhai Bhut
- Born: 4 August 1997 (age 29); Junagadh, Gujarat, India
- Batting: Right-handed
- Bowling: Slow left-arm orthodox
- Role: All-rounder
- Source: Cricinfo, 25 December 2019

Parth Bhut (born 4 August 1997) is an Indian cricketer. He made his first-class debut on 25 December 2019, for Saurashtra in the 2019–20 Ranji Trophy. He made his List A debut on 1 March 2021, for Saurashtra in the 2020–21 Vijay Hazare Trophy. He made his Twenty20 debut on 4 November 2021, for Saurashtra in the 2021–22 Syed Mushtaq Ali Trophy.
