= Biju George =

Indian former cricketer (born 1955)

Personal information
- Full name: Biju George
- Born: 1 February 1966 (age 60); Thiruvananthapuram, Kerala, India
- Batting: Right-handed
- Bowling: Right-arm medium
- Source: CricketArchive, 30 January 2012

Biju George (born 1 February 1966), is an Indian former cricketer and current Delhi Capitals fielding coach. Before appointment in coaching panel of Delhi Capitals, George also served as fielding coach for Sunrisers Hyderabad, Indian Woman cricket team and Indian U19 team.

Biju is a Level III certification in coaching from the National Cricket Academy (NCA) of the Board of Control for Cricket in India(BCCI), Since 1992 he is coach with Sports Authority of India(SAI)

Biju is a former fielding coach of the India women's team and has worked with the team's recent coaches - Tushar Arothe, WV Raman and Ramesh Powar. The coach from Trivandrum was associated with Kolkata Knight Riders for two years (2015 and 2016) and Sunrisers Hyderabad for a year in 2020. In between, he had also coached the Kuwait national team.

Biju George has been appointed as the new fielding coach for the Indian Premier League (IPL) 2022 season. He will take over for Mohammad Kaif, a former India cricketer who occupied the seat until the previous season. Biju will take part in the coaching group that includes head coach Ricky Ponting, his colleagues Shane Watson & James Hopes, as well as former India batsmen Ajit Agarkar & Pravin Amre.
