= Pragnay Reddy =

Indian cricketer (born 1999)

Sai Pragnay Reddy
Personal information
- Born: 18 December 1999 (age 26)
- Source: Cricinfo, 12 January 2021

Pragnay Reddy (born 18 December 1999) is an Indian cricketer, who bats right-handed, usually as an opener. He made his Twenty20 debut on 12 January 2021, for Hyderabad in the 2020–21 Syed Mushtaq Ali Trophy.
