= Mitesh Patel (cricketer) =

Indian cricketer (born 1997)

Personal information
- Born: 15 May 1997 (age 29)
- Source: ESPNcricinfo, 1 November 2017

Mitesh Patel (born 15 May 1997) is an Indian cricketer. He made his first-class debut for Baroda in the 2017–18 Ranji Trophy on 1 November 2017. He made his Twenty20 debut for Baroda in the 2018–19 Syed Mushtaq Ali Trophy on 21 February 2019. He made his List A debut on 4 October 2019, for Baroda in the 2019–20 Vijay Hazare Trophy.
