= Arpit Pannu =

Indian cricketer (born 1996)

Personal information
- Born: 24 April 1996 (age 30); Chandigarh, India
- Source: ESPNcricinfo, 1 November 2018

Arpit Pannu (born 24 April 1996) is an Indian cricketer. He made his first-class debut for Punjab in the 2018–19 Ranji Trophy on 1 November 2018. He made his List A debut on 14 October 2019, for Chandigarh in the 2019–20 Vijay Hazare Trophy. He made his Twenty20 debut on 5 November 2021, for Chandigarh in the 2021–22 Syed Mushtaq Ali Trophy.
