= Chandan Sahani =

Indian cricketer (born 1998)

Personal information
- Full name: Chandan Purna Sahani
- Born: 29 January 1998 (age 28)
- Batting: Right-handed
- Bowling: Right-arm medium

Domestic team information
- Years: Team
- 2021–present: Hyderabad
- Source: ESPNcricinfo, 22 December 2021

Chandan Sahani (born 29 January 1998) is an Indian cricketer, who bats right-handed. He made his List-A debut for Hyderabad in the 2021–22 Vijay Hazare Trophy on 8 December 2021, scoring seven runs before he was bowled by Yuzvendra Chahal. He made his first-class debut on 3 March 2022, for Hyderabad in the 2021–22 Ranji Trophy, scoring six and 54 runs in the two innings.
