= Milap Mewada =

Indian cricketer

Personal information
- Full name: Milap Pradeepkumar Mewada
- Born: 15 September 1974 (age 52); Mehsana, Gujarat, India
- Batting: Right-handed
- Role: Wicket-keeper

Domestic team information
- Years: Team
- 1996/97–2004/05: Baroda

Career statistics
Competition	FC	List A
Matches	11	26
Runs scored	242	196
Batting average	17.28	17.81
100s/50s	0/1	0/0
Top score	62	34
Catches/stumpings	38/2	29/10
- Source: ESPNcricinfo, 20 August 2019

Milap Pradeepkumar Mewada (born 15 September 1974) is a former Indian first-class cricketer who played for Baroda from 1996/97 to 2004/05. He became a cricket coach after his playing career. He is the batting coach of the Afghanistan national cricket team.

== Life and career ==
Born in Mehsana, Gujarat, Mewada played for India under-19s in the 1993/94 season before getting selected in the Baroda senior team two seasons later. As a wicket-keeper, he appeared in a total of 11 first-class and 26 List A matches in a career that spanned between 1996/97 and 2004/05. He also represented West Zone in the Deodhar Trophy.

Mewada took up cricket coaching following his retirement. After having worked as the assistant coach of Baroda, Mewada coached the Chhattisgarh under-19 team which qualified for the knockout stage of a domestic competition. He was selected as the head coach of Jammu and Kashmir in 2018, with former Baroda teammate Irfan Pathan being named its mentor.
