= Ripal Patel =

Indian cricketer (born 1995)

Personal information
- Full name: Ripal Vinubhai Patel
- Born: 28 September 1995 (age 31); Nadiad, Gujarat, India
- Batting: Right handed
- Bowling: Right arm medium
- Role: Batsman

Domestic team information
- Years: Team
- 2019/20–present: Gujarat
- 2021–2023: Delhi Capitals

Career statistics
Competition	List A	Twenty20
Matches	9	11
Runs scored	111	191
Batting average	13.87	31.83
100s/50s	0/0	0/0
Top score	35	41*
Balls bowled	84	6
Wickets	4	0
Bowling average	20.50	-
5 wickets in innings	0	-
10 wickets in match	0	-
Best bowling	2/25	-
Catches/stumpings	2/0	4/0
- Source: ESPNcricinfo, 5 May 2022

Ripal Vinubhai Patel (born 28 September 1995) is an Indian cricketer. He made his List A debut on 24 September 2019, for Gujarat in the 2019–20 Vijay Hazare Trophy. He made his Twenty20 debut on 11 November 2019, for Gujarat in the 2019–20 Syed Mushtaq Ali Trophy.

In February 2021, Patel was bought by the Delhi Capitals in the IPL auction ahead of the 2021 Indian Premier League. On 4 October 2021, he made his debut in the Indian Premier League (IPL), against Chennai Super Kings, during the 50th match of 2021 Indian Premier League. In February 2022, he was bought by the Delhi Capitals in the auction for the 2022 Indian Premier League tournament.
