= Abhirath Reddy =

Indian cricketer (born 1996)

Personal information
- Full name: Mandadi Abhirath Reddy
- Born: 20 September 1996 (age 30); Hyderabad, Telangana, India
- Batting: Right-handed
- Source: ESPNcricinfo, 11 December 2021

Abhirath Reddy (born 20 September 1996) is an Indian cricketer. Reddy is a right-handed batsman. He made his List A debut on 11 December 2021, for Hyderabad in the 2021–22 Vijay Hazare Trophy.
