= Yashu Sharma =

Indian cricketer (born 1998)

Personal information
- Born: 19 September 1998 (age 28); Rohtak, Haryana, India
- Batting: Left-handed
- Bowling: Right arm offbreak

Domestic team information
- Years: Team
- 2018–present: Haryana
- Source: Cricinfo, 28 February 2019

Yashu Sharma (born 19 September 1998) is an Indian cricketer who bats left-handed but is a right-arm off-break bowler. He made his Twenty20 debut for Haryana in the 2018–19 Syed Mushtaq Ali Trophy on 28 February 2019. He made his List A debut on 10 October 2019, for Haryana in the 2019–20 Vijay Hazare Trophy. He made his first-class debut on 12 February 2020, for Haryana in the 2019–20 Ranji Trophy.
