= Rahul Buddhi =

Indian cricketer (born 1997)

Personal information
- Full name: Rahul Ravinder Buddhi
- Born: 20 September 1997 (age 29); Hyderabad, India

Domestic team information
- Years: Team
- 2019/20-present: Hyderabad

Career statistics
Competition	FC
Matches	2
Runs scored	102
Batting average	25.50
100s/50s	0/1
Top score	52
Balls bowled	4
Wickets	0
Bowling average	–
5 wickets in innings	0
10 wickets in match	0
Best bowling	–
Catches/stumpings	0/–
- Source: Cricinfo, 7 May 2020

Rahul Buddhi (born 20 September 1997) is an Indian cricketer. He made his first-class debut on 19 January 2020, for Hyderabad in the 2019–20 Ranji Trophy. He made his Twenty20 debut on 10 January 2021, for Hyderabad in the 2020–21 Syed Mushtaq Ali Trophy. He made his List A debut on 8 December 2021, for Hyderabad in the 2021–22 Vijay Hazare Trophy. In February 2022, he was bought by the Mumbai Indians in the auction for the 2022 Indian Premier League tournament for the base price of two million Indian rupees.
