= 2021–22 Syed Mushtaq Ali Trophy =

Indian cricket tournament

- Dates: 4 – 22 November 2021
- Administrator: BCCI
- Cricket format: T20
- Tournament format(s): Round robin, then knockout
- Champions: Tamil Nadu (3rd title)
- Participants: 38
- Matches: 105
- Most runs: Tanmay Agarwal (334) (Hyderabad)
- Most wickets: Chama Milind (18) (Hyderabad)
- Official website: http://www.bcci.tv

The 2021–22 Syed Mushtaq Ali Trophy (also known as the Paytm Syed Mushtaq Ali Trophy for sponsorship reasons) was the fourteenth edition of the Syed Mushtaq Ali Trophy, an annual Twenty20 tournament in India. Played from 4 to 22 November 2021, it was contested by all 38 Ranji Trophy teams and won by defending champions Tamil Nadu, their third title. The tournament formed part of the 2021–22 Indian domestic cricket season, which was announced by the Board of Control for Cricket in India (BCCI) in July 2021.

The tournament was originally scheduled to begin on 20 October 2021, but was postponed to 27 October 2021. It eventually started on 4 November 2021. The teams were initially divided into five groups, with seven teams each in Groups A and B, and eight each in Groups C, D and E. However, in August 2021, the BCCI announced that the tournament would be divided into six groups, with six teams in the five Elite Groups, and eight teams in the Plate Group. The winners of each Elite Group progressed directly to the quarter-finals, with the second-placed teams and the winner of the Plate Group playing in pre-quarters matches to determine the final eight teams. It was played in six cities across the country (Baroda, Delhi, Guwahati, Haryana, Lucknow and Vijayawada), with all the knockout matches played in Delhi.

On 8 November 2021, in the Plate Group match between Vidarbha and Manipur, Akshay Karnewar of Vidarbha became the first bowler to bowl four overs in a Twenty20 cricket match without conceding a run.

Tamil Nadu, Gujarat, Bengal, Hyderabad and Rajasthan all won their Elite Groups, advancing to the quarter-finals, with Maharashtra, Kerala, Karnataka, Saurashtra, Himachal Pradesh and Vidarbha progressing to the preliminary quarter-finals. Vidarbha, Karnataka and Kerala all won their preliminary quarter-final matches to reach the quarter-finals of the tournament. In the quarter-finals, Tamil Nadu, Vidarbha, Hyderabad and Karnataka all won their matches, with Karnataka winning a Super Over against Bengal.

In the first semi-final match, defending champions Tamil Nadu beat Hyderabad by eight wickets, after Hyderabad were bowled out for 90 runs. In the second semi-final, Karnataka scored 176/7 from their twenty overs against Vidarbha, winning by four runs to join Tamil Nadu in the final. In the final, Tamil Nadu beat Karnataka by four wickets to win the tournament and retain their title.

== Player transfers ==
The following player transfers were approved ahead of the season.

Player	From	To
Subodh Bhati	Delhi	Pondicherry
Yudhvir Charak	Hyderabad	Jammu and Kashmir
Pavan Deshpande	Karnataka	Pondicherry
Deepak Hooda	Baroda	Rajasthan
Sheldon Jackson	Pondicherry	Saurashtra
Uday Kaul	Chandigarh	Mizoram
Liyan Khan	Karnataka	Sikkim
Chirag Khurana	Maharashtra	Meghalaya
Kranthi Kumar	Karnataka	Sikkim
Abu Nechim	Assam	Nagaland
Shubham Ranjane	Mumbai	Goa
Anshuman Rath	Hong Kong	Odisha
Rahil Shah	Uttarakhand	Tripura
Hanuma Vihari	Andhra	Hyderabad
Shrikant Wagh	Vidarbha	Goa

== League stage ==
=== Group A ===
Pos	Team	Pld	W	L	NR	Pts	NRR
1	Tamil Nadu (Note: Tamil Nadu finishing first and qualified for the quarter finals by winning their last league match against Maharashtra, despite having lesser net run rate than the latter team.)	5	4	1	0	16	0.564
2	Maharashtra	5	4	1	0	16	2.277
3	Punjab	5	3	2	0	12	1.619
4	Goa	5	2	3	0	8	−1.368
5	Odisha	5	1	4	0	4	−0.957
6	Pondicherry	5	1	4	0	4	−2.073

Source: ESPN Cricinfo
Notes:

Advanced to Quarter-final
Advanced to Preliminary quarter-final

=== Group B ===
Pos	Team	Pld	W	L	NR	Pts	NRR
1	Bengal	5	4	1	0	16	0.995
2	Karnataka	5	4	1	0	16	0.379
3	Mumbai	5	3	2	0	12	0.990
4	Chhattisgarh	5	2	3	0	8	−0.146
5	Baroda	5	1	4	0	4	−0.750
6	Services	5	1	4	0	4	−1.513

Source: ESPN Cricinfo

Advanced to Quarter-final
Advanced to Preliminary quarter-final

=== Group C ===
Pos	Team	Pld	W	L	NR	Pts	NRR
1	Rajasthan	5	5	0	0	20	1.242
2	Himachal Pradesh	5	3	2	0	12	−0.260
3	Jharkhand	5	2	3	0	8	−0.137
4	Andhra Pradesh	5	2	3	0	8	−0.156
5	Haryana	5	2	3	0	8	−0.315
6	Jammu and Kashmir	5	1	4	0	4	−0.360

Source: ESPN Cricinfo

Advanced to Quarter-final
Advanced to Preliminary quarter-final

=== Group D ===
Pos	Team	Pld	W	L	NR	Pts	NRR
1	Gujarat	5	4	1	0	16	1.109
2	Kerala (Note: Kerala finishing second and qualified for the knockout stage by winning their last league match against Madhya Pradesh, despite having lesser net run rate than the latter team.)	5	3	2	0	12	0.363
3	Madhya Pradesh	5	3	2	0	12	1.147
4	Assam	5	2	3	0	8	−0.533
5	Railways	5	2	3	0	8	−0.654
6	Bihar	5	1	4	0	4	−1.370

Source: ESPN Cricinfo
Notes:

Advanced to Quarter-final
Advanced to Preliminary quarter-final

=== Group E ===
Pos	Team	Pld	W	L	NR	Pts	NRR
1	Hyderabad	5	5	0	0	20	1.114
2	Saurashtra	5	4	1	0	16	0.511
3	Delhi	5	3	2	0	12	0.982
4	Uttar Pradesh	5	2	3	0	8	−0.399
5	Chandigarh	5	1	4	0	4	−0.973
6	Uttarakhand	5	0	5	0	0	−1.244

Source: ESPN Cricinfo

Advanced to Quarter-final
Advanced to Preliminary quarter-final

=== Plate Group ===
Pos	Team	Pld	W	L	NR	Pts	NRR
1	Vidarbha	5	5	0	0	20	4.967
2	Tripura	5	4	1	0	16	2.151
3	Meghalaya	5	4	1	0	16	1.131
4	Nagaland	5	3	2	0	12	0.396
5	Sikkim	5	2	3	0	8	−1.427
6	Mizoram	5	1	4	0	4	−0.959
7	Manipur	5	1	4	0	4	−2.708
8	Arunachal Pradesh	5	0	5	0	0	−3.322

Source: ESPN Cricinfo

Advanced to Preliminary quarter-final

== Knockout stage ==
Preliminary QF
C2	Himachal Pradesh	145/6
D2	Kerala	147/2
A2	Maharashtra	157/8
P1	Vidarbha	160/3
B2	Karnataka	150/8
E2	Saurashtra	145/7

Quarter-finals
A1	Tamil Nadu	187/5
D2	Kerala	181/4
D1	Gujarat	128/8
E1	Hyderabad	158/5
C1	Rajasthan	84/8
P1	Vidarbha	87/1
B1	Bengal	160/8
B2	Karnataka	160/5

Semi-finals
A1	Tamil Nadu	92/2
E1	Hyderabad	90
B2	Karnataka	176/7
P1	Vidarbha	172/6

Final
A1	Tamil Nadu	153/6
B2	Karnataka	151/7

=== Preliminary quarter-finals ===
Preliminary quarter-final 1
16 November 2021
Scorecard

Maharashtra; 157/8 (20 overs)	v	Vidarbha; 160/3 (17.5 overs)
Rahul Tripathi 66 (45); Yash Thakur 3/17 (4 overs)		Akshay Wadkar 58* (47); Mukesh Choudhary 1/24 (3 overs)

Vidarbha won by 7 wickets
Arun Jaitley Stadium, Delhi
Umpires: Yeshwant Barde and Chirra Ravikanthreddy

- Vidarbha won the toss and elected to field.

Preliminary quarter-final 2
16 November 2021
Scorecard

Saurashtra; 145/7 (20 overs)	v	Karnataka; 150/8 (19.5 overs)
Sheldon Jackson 50 (43); Vijaykumar Vyshak 2/19 (4 overs)		Abhinav Manohar 70* (49); Jaydev Unadkat 4/22 (4 overs)

Karnataka won by 2 wickets
Arun Jaitley Stadium, Delhi
Umpires: Vineet Kulkarni and Krishnamachari Srinivasan

- Saurashtra won the toss and elected to bat.
- Abhinav Manohar (Karnataka) made his T20 debut.

Preliminary quarter-final 3
16 November 2021
Scorecard

Himachal Pradesh; 145/6 (20 overs)	v	Kerala; 147/2 (19.3 overs)
Raghav Dhawan 65 (52); Sudhesan Midhun 2/26 (3 overs)		Mohammed Azharuddeen 60 (57); Pankaj Jaswal 1/13 (2 overs)

Kerala won by 8 wickets
Palam A Stadium, Delhi
Umpires: Ulhas Gandhe and Pashchim Pathak

- Kerala won the toss and elected to field.
- Suresh Vishweshwar (Kerala) made his T20 debut.

=== Quarter-finals ===
1st Quarter-final
18 November 2021
Scorecard

Kerala; 181/4 (20 overs)	v	Tamil Nadu; 187/5 (19.3 overs)
Vishnu Vinod 65* (26); Sanjay Yadav 2/23 (4 overs)		Sai Sudharshan 46 (31); Unnikrishnan Manukrishnan 3/26 (4 overs)

Tamil Nadu won by 5 wickets
Arun Jaitley Stadium, Delhi
Umpires: Abhijit Deshmukh and Ulhas Gandhe

- Tamil Nadu won the toss and elected to field.

2nd Quarter-final
18 November 2021
Scorecard

Karnataka; 160/5 (20 overs)	v	Bengal; 160/8 (20 overs)
Karun Nair 55* (29); Writtick Chatterjee 1/23 (2 overs)		Writtick Chatterjee 51 (40); MB Darshan 3/26 (4 overs)

Match tied
(Karnataka won the Super Over)
Arun Jaitley Stadium, Delhi
Umpires: Vineet Kulkarni and Krishnamachari Srinivasan

- Bengal won the toss and elected to field.
- Super Over: Bengal 5/2 (0.4 overs), Karnataka 8/0 (0.2 overs).

3rd Quarter-final
18 November 2021
Scorecard

Rajasthan; 84/8 (20 overs)	v	Vidarbha; 87/1 (14.1 overs)
Kamlesh Nagarkoti 39* (48); Yash Thakur 2/24 (4 overs)		Atharva Taide 40* (42); Aniket Choudhary 1/4 (2 overs)

Vidarbha won by 9 wickets
Palam A Stadium, Delhi
Umpires: Yeshwant Barde and Chirra Ravikanthreddy

- Vidarbha won the toss and elected to field.

4th Quarter-final
18 November 2021
Scorecard

Hyderabad; 158/5 (20 overs)	v	Gujarat; 128/8 (20 overs)
Tilak Varma 75 (50); Piyush Chawla 2/9 (4 overs)		Ripal Patel 35 (24); Ravi Teja 3/27 (4 overs)

Hyderabad won by 30 runs
Palam A Stadium, Delhi
Umpires: Yeshwant Barde and Chirra Ravikanthreddy

- Gujarat won the toss and elected to field.

=== Semi-finals ===
1st Semi-final
20 November 2021
Scorecard

Hyderabad; 90 (18.3 overs)	v	Tamil Nadu; 92/2 (14.2 overs)
Tanay Thyagarajan 25 (24); P Saravana Kumar 5/21 (3.3 overs)		Vijay Shankar 43* (40); Rakshann Readdi 2/23 (3.2 overs)

Tamil Nadu won by 8 wickets
Arun Jaitley Stadium, Delhi
Umpires: Ulhas Gandhe and Pashchim Pathak

- Tamil Nadu won the toss and elected to field.

2nd Semi-final
20 November 2021
Scorecard

Karnataka; 176/7 (20 overs)	v	Vidarbha; 172/6 (20 overs)
Rohan Kadam 87 (56); Darshan Nalkande 4/28 (4 overs)		Atharva Taide 32 (16); K. C. Cariappa 2/27 (4 overs)

Karnataka won by 4 runs
Arun Jaitley Stadium, Delhi
Umpires: Vineet Kulkarni and Krishnamachari Srinivasan

- Vidarbha won the toss and elected to field.

=== Final ===
Final
22 November 2021
Scorecard

Karnataka; 151/7 (20 overs)	v	Tamil Nadu; 153/6 (20 overs)
Abhinav Manohar 46 (37); Sai Kishore 3/12 (4 overs)		Shahrukh Khan 33* (15); K. C. Cariappa 2/23 (4 overs)

Tamil Nadu won by 4 wickets
Arun Jaitley Stadium, Delhi
Umpires: Pashchim Pathak and Chirra Ravikanthreddy
Player of the match: Shahrukh Khan (Tamil Nadu)

- Tamil Nadu won the toss and elected to field.
