= Pradeep Sangwan =

Indian cricketer (born 1990)

Personal information
- Full name: Pradeep Jaibeer Sangwan
- Born: 5 November 1990 (age 36); Rasiwas, Delhi, India
- Height: 6 ft 1 in (1.85 m)
- Batting: Right-handed
- Bowling: Left-arm medium
- Role: Bowler

Domestic team information
- Years: Team
- 2007–present: Delhi
- 2008–2010: Delhi Daredevils
- 2011–2013: Kolkata Knight Riders
- 2016: Gujarat Lions
- 2018: Mumbai Indians
- 2022: Gujarat Titans
- FC debut: 4 November 2007 Delhi v Rajasthan
- LA debut: 16 January 2008 Delhi v Services

Career statistics
Competition	FC	LA	T20
Matches	58	60	102
Runs scored	1,275	548	262
Batting average	19.61	22.83	11.90
100s/50s	1/4	0/2	0/0
Top score	100*	69*	29
Balls bowled	10,248	2,987	2,110
Wickets	178	99	104
Bowling average	30.43	26.86	26.05
5 wickets in innings	6	2	0
10 wickets in match	0	0	0
Best bowling	7/38	5/41	3/13
Catches/stumpings	24/–	10/–	34/–
- Source: ESPNcricinfo, 6 March 2025

Pradeep Sangwan (born 5 November 1990) is an Indian cricketer, who represents Delhi in first-class cricket. He completed his schooling at Ravindra Public School in Delhi.

== Career ==
Sangwan is a left-arm medium pace bowler. Coached by AN Sharma, Sangwan was a member of the Delhi under-15 team that won the Polly Umrigar Trophy in 2005. He took 27 wickets in six matches and also scored 62 in a partnership of 125 for the last wicket in the quarter-final.

Sangwan was a member of the victorious Indian team at the Under-19 World Cup held in Malaysia in 2008 and bowled several incisive spells with the new ball. He was instrumental in India's success at the 2008 Under-19 World Cup, where the team was led by Virat Kohli. He took 8 wickets, including a spell of 5/44 that was crucial in India's victory against South Africa in the group stage. He was named captain of the Delhi T20 team for the Syed Mushtaq Ali Trophy 2018 and replaced Rishabh Pant as captain. In his debut season of the Ranji Trophy for Delhi in 2007–08, Sangwan took 33 wickets at an average of 19.24 and also scored 122 runs at an average of 20.33. He took 9 wickets in the final against Uttar Pradesh.

Sangwan was the first under-19 pick at the inaugural Indian Premier League draft, and was bought by the Delhi Daredevils. He was signed by Kolkata Knight Riders for the 2011 season and in January 2018 was bought by Mumbai Indians. In February 2022, he was bought by Gujarat Titans in the auction.

== Doping ==
Sangwan tested positive in a random dope test conducted during the 2013 IPL season. His A sample reportedly showed the presence of banned substances.
