= Rakshan Readdi =

Indian cricketer (born 2000)

Rakshann Readdi
Personal information
- Full name: Chinntla Rakshan Readdi
- Born: 29 September 2000 (age 26); Hyderabad, India
- Source: Cricinfo, 16 January 2021

Rakshann Readdi (born 29 September 2000) is an Indian cricketer. He made his Twenty20 debut on 16 January 2021, for Hyderabad in the 2020–21 Syed Mushtaq Ali Trophy. He made his List A debut on 26 February 2021, for Hyderabad in the 2020–21 Vijay Hazare Trophy. He made his first-class debut on 17 February 2022, for Hyderabad in the 2021–22 Ranji Trophy.
