= Karan Sharma (cricketer, born 1998) =

Indian cricketer (born 1998)

Personal information
- Full name: Karan Sunny Sharma
- Born: 31 October 1998 (age 28); Delhi, India
- Batting: Right-handed
- Bowling: Right-arm offbreak
- Role: Allrounder

Domestic team information
- Years: Team
- 2021–present: Uttar Pradesh
- 2022–2023: Lucknow Super Giants

Career statistics
Competition	T20	LA	FC
Matches	27	24	12
Runs scored	608	486	433
Batting average	27.63	23.14	25.47
100s/50s	0/6	0/1	1/1
Top score	79*	83	116
Balls bowled	168	420	1723
Wickets	10	9	21
Bowling average	17.70	39.88	40.00
5 wickets in innings	0	0	0
10 wickets in match	0	0	0
Best bowling	3/19	2/15	4/46
Catches/stumpings	3/0	5/0	5/0
- Source: ESPNcricinfo, 6 November 2023

Karan Sharma (born 31 October 1998) is an Indian cricketer. He made his Twenty20 debut on 10 January 2021, for Uttar Pradesh in the 2020–21 Syed Mushtaq Ali Trophy. He made his List A debut on 20 February 2021, for Uttar Pradesh in the 2020–21 Vijay Hazare Trophy. In February 2022, he was bought by the Lucknow Super Giants in the auction for the 2022 Indian Premier League tournament. He made his first-class debut on 17 February 2022, for Uttar Pradesh in the 2021–22 Ranji Trophy.

== Education ==
He studied at SGTB Khalsa College of University of Delhi.
