= Ravi Teja (cricketer) =

Indian cricketer (born 1994)

Personal information
- Full name: Telukupalli Ravi Teja
- Born: 19 October 1994 (age 32); Hyderabad, India
- Batting: Left-handed
- Bowling: Right-arm medium

Domestic team information
- Years: Team
- 2017-present: Hyderabad

Career statistics
Competition	FC	LA	T20
Matches	14	8	11
Runs scored	588	146	104
Batting average	29.40	20.85	17.33
100s/50s	1/4	0/1	0/0
Top score	115*	53	31*
Balls bowled	1,943	282	180
Wickets	25	5	8
Bowling average	46.28	52.00	32.75
5 wickets in innings	2	0	0
10 wickets in match	0	0	0
Best bowling	5/49	2/53	2/10
Catches/stumpings	2/–	1/–	3/–
- Source: ESPNcricinfo, 6 May 2020

Ravi Teja (born 19 October 1994) is an Indian cricketer.

Teja made his Twenty20 debut for Hyderabad in the 2016–17 Inter State Twenty-20 Tournament on 29 January 2017. He made his first-class debut for Hyderabad in the 2017–18 Ranji Trophy on 1 November 2017, scoring fifty and taking five wickets in the first match which also earned him the Player of the Match award. He made his List A debut for Hyderabad in the 2017–18 Vijay Hazare Trophy on 5 February 2018.
