= Chama Milind =

Indian cricketer (born 1994)

Personal information
- Full name: Chama Vrajendra Milind
- Born: 4 September 1994 (age 32); Hyderabad, Telangana
- Batting: Left-handed
- Bowling: Left-arm medium
- Role: Bowler

Domestic team information
- Years: Team
- 2013–present: Hyderabad

Career statistics
Competition	FC	LA	T20
Matches	38	36	41
Runs scored	872	313	145
Batting average	22.94	14.90	11.15
100s/50s	1/3	0/0	0/0
Top score	136	42*	26
Balls bowled	6,099	1,660	866
Wickets	85	64	62
Bowling average	37.07	22.68	16.90
5 wickets in innings	2	1	0
10 wickets in match	0	0	0
Best bowling	5/28	6/43	4/18
Catches/stumpings	7/–	8/–	13/–
- Source: ESPNcricinfo, 7 May 2020

Chama Milind (born 4 September 1994) is an Indian first-class cricketer who plays for the Hyderabad cricket team. He is a left-handed batsman and left-arm medium bowler. He was a member of India Under-19 cricket team. In February 2022, he was bought by the Royal Challengers Bangalore in the auction for the 2022 Indian Premier League tournament for the base price of INR 20 lakh.
