= Hyderabad cricket team =

Indian cricket team

Personnel
- Captain: Tilak Varma
- Coach: Vineet Saxena
- Owner: Hyderabad Cricket Association

Team information
- Founded: 1931
- Home ground: Rajiv Gandhi International Stadium
- Capacity: 55,000

History
- First-class debut: Maharaj Kumar of Vizianagram's XI in 1931 at Gymkhana Ground, Secunderabad
- Ranji Trophy wins: 2 (1937/38, 1986/87)
- Irani Cup wins: 1 (1986/87)
- Vijay Hazare Trophy wins: 0
- Syed Mushtaq Ali Trophy wins: 0
- Official website: HCA

The Hyderabad cricket team is a domestic cricket team based in the city of Hyderabad, Telangana, run by the Hyderabad Cricket Association. It is part of the Ranji Trophy Plate Group and has seen scattered success over its many years in the Ranji Trophy circuit. It has won Ranji Trophy twice and been runners-up thrice and have made one appearance in the Irani Trophy.

== Competition history ==
Hyderabad was the third team in the history of the Ranji Trophy to win the tournament, when it did so in the 1937/38 tournament, beating defending champions Nawanagar in a nailbiting one wicket victory. However, it would not be until 1943 that it would appear in another final and this time, it was thrashed comprehensively by a strong Baroda. In 1965 it lost to the Mumbai cricket team and in doing so, failed to break the famous Mumbai winning streak in the 1960s (Mumbai won every year in the 1960s). Its next taste of success was in 1987, where it beat Delhi through first innings lead. It also appeared in the 2000 final but, once again, was unable to beat Mumbai.

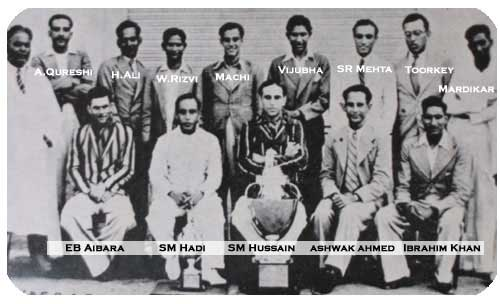
Members of 1937–38 Ranji Trophy winning Hyderabad team

This made up for one appearance in the Irani Trophy, in which it faced up against a 1987 Rest of India side. The match was drawn and Hyderabad won based on its 27-run first innings lead. This was after it was awarded 16 penalty runs for slow over rate by the Rest of India team.

== Performance ==
- Ranji Trophy
  - Winners (2): 1937–38, 1986–87
  - Runners-up (3): 1942–43, 1964–65, 1999–2000
- Irani Cup
  - Winners: 1987–88
- Syed Mushtaq Ali Trophy
  - Runners-up (1): 2009–10

In all first-class matches to the end of the 2013–14 season, Hyderabad had played 389 times, with 135 wins, 74 losses and 180 draws.

== Notable players ==
Players from Telangana who have played Test cricket for India, along with year of Test debut:

- Ghulam Ahmed (1949)
- Motganhalli Jaisimha (1959)
- Abbas Ali Baig (1959)
- Syed Abid Ali (1967)
- Kenia Jayantilal (1971)
- Pochiah Krishnamurthy (1971)
- Madireddy Venkat Narasimha Rao (1979)
- Shivlal Yadav (1979)
- Mohammad Azharuddin (1985)
- Arshad Ayub (1987)
- Venkatapathy Raju (1990)
- Vangipurapu Venkata Sai Laxman (VVS Laxman) (1996)
- Pragyan Ojha (2009)
- Mohammad Siraj (2020)

Players from Telangana who have played ODI but not Test cricket for India, along with the year of ODI debut :

- Noel David (1997)
- Ambati Rayudu (2013)
- Tilak Varma (2023)

== Current squad ==
Players with international caps are listed in bold.

| Name | Birth date | Batting style | Bowling style | Notes |
Batsmen
| Tanmay Agarwal | 3 May 1995 (age 31) | Left-handed | Right-arm leg break | |
| Abhirath Reddy | 29 September 1996 (age 30) | Right-handed | | |
| Rahul Singh | 18 September 1995 (age 31) | Left-handed | Right-arm medium | |
| Kodimela Himateja | 6 September 2001 (age 25) | Left-handed | Right-arm off break | |
| Aman Rao Perala | 2 June 2004 (age 22) | Right-handed | | Plays for **Rajasthan Royals** in IPL |
| Rahul Buddhi | 20 September 1997 (age 29) | Left-handed | Right-arm off break | |
| **Tilak Varma** | 8 November 2002 (age 24) | Left-handed | Right-arm off break | **Captain**; Plays for **Mumbai Indians** in IPL |
| Bhavesh Seth | 7 October 1997 (age 29) | Right-handed | | |
All-rounders
| Varun Goud | 27 September 1999 (age 27) | Right-handed | Right-arm leg break | |
| K Nitish Reddy | 31 December 1997 (age 28) | Right-handed | Right-arm off break | |
| Ruthik Mende | 23 September 2004 (age 22) | Left-handed | Right-arm off break | |
Wicket-keepers
| Pragnay Reddy | 18 December 1999 (age 26) | Right-handed | | |
| Rahul Radesh | 28 January 2003 (age 23) | Left-handed | | |
Spin Bowlers
| Tanay Thyagarajan | 15 November 1995 (age 31) | Left-handed | Slow left-arm orthodox | |
| Gangam Anikethreddy | 28 October 2000 (age 26) | Right-handed | Slow left-arm orthodox | |
| Nitin Sai Yadav | 16 April 2004 (age 22) | Right-handed | Slow left-arm orthodox | |
| Pranav Varma | 15 November 2004 (age 22) | Left-handed | Slow left-arm orthodox | |
| A Ved Reddy | 25 April 2010 (age 16) | Right-handed | Right-arm leg break | |
Pace Bowlers
| Chama Milind | 4 September 1994 (age 32) | Left-handed | Left-arm medium | |
| Rakshann Readdi | 29 September 2000 (age 26) | Right-handed | Right-arm medium | |
| **Mohammed Siraj** | 13 March 1994 (age 32) | Right-handed | Right-arm medium-fast | **Vice-captain**; Plays for **Gujarat Titans** in IPL |
| Ajay Dev Goud | 15 February 2000 (age 26) | Right-handed | Right-arm medium | |

Updated as on 14 November 2026

== Coaching staff ==
- Head Coach: Milap Mewada
- Assistant Coach: Narender Pal Singh
- Physio: Santosh Kumar
- Trainer: Kaneshkk Naidu
- Video Analyst: Santosh BM
- Consultant: VVS Laxman, Venkatapathy Raju

== In popular culture ==
- Hyderabad cricket team was featured in the Jersey, a 2019 fictional sports drama film. In which the main protagonist Arjun played by Nani, plays for this team in Ranji Trophy of 1980s, 1996–97 season.

== See also ==
- Sport in India- overview of sport in India
- Cricket in India
- Sunrisers Hyderabad
- Deccan Chargers
