= 2016–17 Ranji Trophy Group C =

Cricket tournament

2016-17 Ranji Trophy Group C
- The Ranji Trophy, awarded to the winners
- Dates: 6 October 2016 – 10 December 2016
- Administrator: BCCI
- Cricket format: First-class cricket
- Tournament format: Round-robin
- Host: India
- Participants: 10

The 2016–17 Ranji Trophy is the 83rd season of the Ranji Trophy, the first-class cricket tournament in India. It is being contested by 28 teams divided into three groups. Groups A and B comprise nine teams and Group C comprises ten teams. Hyderabad and Haryana qualified for the knockout stage of the tournament.

== Points table ==
Team	Pld	W	L	D	A	Pts	NRR
Hyderabad	9	4	1	3	1	31	–0.117
Haryana	9	3	1	5	0	31	+0.218
Andhra	9	3	1	5	0	28	+0.119
Himachal Pradesh	9	3	0	6	0	26	+0.664
Kerala	9	1	1	7	0	25	+0.206
Goa	9	2	3	4	0	18	–0.330
Services	9	1	2	6	0	16	–0.177
Jammu and Kashmir	9	1	3	5	0	15	–0.383
Chhattisgarh	9	1	4	4	0	14	–0.011
Tripura	9	1	4	3	1	14	–0.196

- Top two teams advanced to knockout stage

== Fixtures ==
=== Round 1 ===
6–9 October
Scorecard

Goa	v	Hyderabad
164 (74 overs); Saurabh Bandekar 59 (144); Mohammed Siraj 4/14 (15 overs)		388 (130 overs); Akshath Reddy 128 (222); Amit Yadav 3/73 (22 overs)
258 (86.1 overs); Sagun Kamat 55 (73); Ravi Kiran 3/40 (15.1 overs)		35/1 (5 overs); Tanmay Agarwal 27* (22); Saurabh Bandekar 1/15 (2 overs)

Hyderabad won by 9 wickets
Vidarbha Cricket Association Stadium, Nagpur
Umpires: Krishnamachari Bharatan and Rohan Pandit
Player of the match: Bavanaka Sandeep (Hyderabad)

- Goa won the toss and elected to bat.

6–9 October
Scorecard

Services	v	Haryana
197 (73 overs); Anshul Gupta 69 (150); Rajat Paliwal 3/14 (7 overs)		248 (89.5 overs); Shubham Rohilla 92 (165); Vikas Yadav 4/80 (28 overs)
329/6d (104.3 overs); Nakul Verma 78 (137); Ashok Sandhu 2/46 (19 overs)		136/1 (36 overs); Nitin Saini 101* (135); Muzzaffaruddin Khalid 1/56 (13 overs)

Match drawn
Brabourne Stadium, Mumbai
Umpires: K. N. Ananthapadmanabhan and Krishnaraj Srinath
Player of the match: Shubham Rohilla (Haryana)

- Haryana won the toss and elected to field.
- Ashok Sandhu (Haryana); Rahul Singh and Vikas Yadav (Services) all made their first-class debuts.

6–9 October
Scorecard

Kerala	v	Jammu & Kashmir
306 (102.1 overs); Sanju Samson 154 (292); Samiullah Beigh 6/82 (27.1 overs)		121 (44 overs); Adil Reshi 40 (38); Karaparambil Monish 4/9 (8 overs)
		91/4 (31.3 overs) (f/o); Shubham Khajuria 39* (90); Iqbal Abdulla 2/21 (7 overs)

Match drawn
Bengal Cricket Academy Ground, Kalyani
Umpires: Vineet Kulkarni and Nikhil Patwardhan
Player of the match: Sanju Samson (Kerala)

- Jammu & Kashmir won the toss and elected to field.

6–9 October
Scorecard

Himachal Pradesh	v	Andhra
357 (93.2 overs); Sumeet Verma 142 (194); Cheepurapalli Stephen 3/74 (19 overs)		167/1 (59 overs); Prasanth Kumar 93* (191); Rishi Dhawan 1/27 (9 overs)

Match drawn
KIIT Stadium, Bhubaneswar
Umpires: Rajesh Deshpande and Tapan Sharma
Player of the match: Prashant Chopra (Himachal Pradesh)

- Himachal Pradesh won the toss and elected to bat.
- Mayank Dagar (Himachal Pradesh) made his first-class debut.

6–9 October
Scorecard

Tripura	v	Chhattisgarh
118 (54 overs); Abhijit Dey 32 (94); Ajay Mandal 3/41 (11 overs)		255 (103.5 overs); Ashutosh Singh 140 (275); Abhijit Dey 4/26 (20.5 overs)
149 (84.3 overs); Smit Patel 26 (100); Ajay Mandal 4/55 (30 overs)		13/1 (3.5 overs); Rishabh Tiwari 8 (5); Rana Dutta 1/10 (1.5 overs)

Chhattisgarh won by 9 wickets
JSCA International Stadium Complex, Ranchi
Umpires: Pashchim Pathak and Belur Ravi
Player of the match: Ashutosh Singh (Chhattisgarh)

- Tripura won the toss and elected to bat.
- This was Chhattisgarh's debut first-class match.
- Ashutosh Singh, Sahil Gupta, Kant Singh, Amandeep Khare, Ajay Mandal, Rishabh Tiwari, Shakeeb Ahmed and Prateek Sinha (Chhattisgarh); Rajat Dey and Gurinder Singh (Tripura) all made their first-class debuts.
- Ashutosh Singh (Chhattisgarh) scored a century on his first-class debut.

=== Round 2 ===
13–16 October
Scorecard

Chhattisgarh	v	Andhra
394 (126.4 overs); Amandeep Khare 143 (270); Duvvarapu Siva Kumar 4/61 (28 overs)		199 (73.2 overs); Prasanth Kumar 62 (91); Pankaj Rao 4/70 (26 overs)
		282/8 (145 overs) (f/o); Srikar Bharat 57 (177); Ajay Mandal 3/30 (48)

Match drawn
Bengal Cricket Academy Ground, Kalyani
Umpires: Navdeep Singh and Virender Sharma
Player of the match: Amandeep Khare (Chhattisgarh)

- Andhra won the toss and elected to field.
- Pankaj Rao (Chhattisgarh) made his first-class debut.

13–16 October
Scorecard

Jammu & Kashmir	v	Goa
227 (70.3 overs); Parvez Rasool 82 (83); Shadab Jakati 4/48 (17 overs)		77 (30.5 overs); Swapnil Asnodkar 18 (32); Ram Dayal 4/15 (11.5 overs)
261 (61.3 overs); Puneet Bisht 87 (106); Amulaya Pandrekar 3/39 (11.3 overs)		295 (92.1 overs); Samar Dubhashi 79* (174); Parvez Rasool 5/89 (35 overs)

Jammu & Kashmir won by 116 runs
Lalabhai Contractor Stadium, Surat
Umpires: Balwant Sharma and Ulhas Gandhe
Player of the match: Parvez Rasool (Jammu & Kashmir)

- Jammu & Kashmir won the toss and elected to bat.
- Felix Alemao (Goa) made his first-class debut.

13–16 October
Scorecard

Hyderabad	v	Haryana
191 (82.5 overs); Bavanaka Sandeep 44 (120); Yuzvendra Chahal 6/44 (27 overs)		331 (130.4 overs); Chaitanya Bishnoi 73 (202); Mehdi Hasan 6/93 (40.4 overs)
224 (83.5 overs); Chama Milind 66* (114); Mohit Sharma 5/26 (14 overs)		85/2 (16.4 overs); Nitin Saini 45 (59); Mohammed Siraj 1/18 (3 overs)

Haryana won by 8 wickets
Keenan Stadium, Jamshedpur
Umpires: Rajesh Deshpande and Tapan Sharma
Player of the match: Yuzvendra Chahal (Haryana)

- Hyderabad won the toss and elected to bat.

13–16 October
Scorecard

Kerala	v	Himachal Pradesh
248 (107.1 overs); Sachin Baby 61 (209); Rishi Dhawan 4/66 (30.1 overs)		261 (75.1 overs); Prashant Chopra 60 (79); Jalaj Saxena 5/76 (20 overs)
115 (44.5 overs); Rohan Prem 20 (37); Basil Thampi 20 (37); Gurvinder Singh 5/37 (15.5 overs)		103/4 (25 overs); Paras Dogra 27* (45); Karaparambil Monish 3/31 (11 overs)

Himachal Pradesh won by 6 wickets
Eden Gardens, Kolkata
Umpires: Pashchim Pathak and Nikhil Patwardhan
Player of the match: Gurvinder Singh (Himachal Pradesh)

- Himachal Pradesh won the toss and elected to field.

13–16 October
Scorecard

Tripura	v	Services
275 (91.4 overs); Bishal Ghosh 49 (98); Muzzaffaruddin Khalid 4/61 (19 overs)		233 (82.5 overs); Shamsher Yadav 101* (197); Rana Dutta 3/48 (17 overs)
340/3d (89.2 overs); Udiyan Bose 165 (263); Anshul Gupta 1/4 (1.2 overs)		163 (54.1 overs); Rahul Singh 51 (109); Gurinder Singh 4/25 (15.1 overs)

Tripura won by 219 runs
Barsapara Cricket Stadium, Guwahati
Umpires: Belur Ravi and Sadashiv Iyer
Player of the match: Udiyan Bose (Tripura)

- Services won the toss and elected to field.
- Raj Bahadur (Services) made his first-class debut.
- This was Tripura's first victory in the Ranji Trophy since beating Himachal Pradesh in December of the 2012–13 tournament.

=== Round 3 ===
20–23 October
Scorecard

Kerala	v	Hyderabad
517/9d (181 overs); Iqbal Abdulla 159* (217); Mehdi Hasan 3/134 (54 overs)		281 (97.3 overs); Mehdi Hasan 58 (114); Karaparambil Monish 3/56 (22.3 overs)
		220/3 (69 overs); Balchander Anirudh 120* (192); Iqbal Abdulla 1/37 (12.5 overs)

Match drawn
KIIT Stadium, Bhubaneswar
Umpires: Ulhas Gandhe and Sanjay Hazare
Player of the match: Iqbal Abdulla (Kerala)

- Kerala won the toss and elected to bat.

20–23 October
Scorecard

Haryana	v	Chhattisgarh
178 (54.1 overs); Rohit Sharma 45 (92); Ajay Mandal 4/26 (13.4 overs)		189 (78.2 overs); Sahil Gupta 78 (180); Joginder Sharma 5/32 (9 overs)
289 (92 overs); Himanshu Rana 75 (130); Pankaj Rao 5/74 (27 overs)		117 (44 overs); Abhimanyu Chauhan 46 (85); Mohit Sharma 5/27 (11 overs)

Haryana won by 161 runs
Barsapara Cricket Stadium, Guwahati
Umpires: Sadashiv Iyer and Krishnamachari Srinivasan
Player of the match: Joginder Sharma (Haryana)

- Haryana won the toss and elected to bat.
- Abhishek Tamrakar (Chhattisgarh) made his first-class debut.

20–23 October
Scorecard

Tripura	v	Himachal Pradesh
549 (162.2 overs); Bishal Ghosh 146 (247); Mayank Dagar 5/138 (43 overs)		311 (97.2 overs); Robin Bist 88 (159); Rana Dutta 6/58 (19 overs)
		349/5 (80 overs) (f/o); Ankush Bains 112 (182); Gurinder Singh 4/96 (30 overs)

Match drawn
Bengal Cricket Academy Ground, Kalyani
Umpires: Sudhir Asnani and Nitin Pandit
Player of the match: Rana Dutta (Tripura)

- Himachal Pradesh won the toss and elected to field.
- Rana Dutta (Tripura) took a hat-trick. He became first bowler from Tripura to take a hat-trick.

20–23 October
Scorecard

Goa	v	Services
606/6d (165); Sagun Kamat 304* (453); Diwesh Pathania 3/111 (34 overs)		279 (107.1 overs); Rahul Singh 89 (180); Felix Alemao 4/56 (13 overs)
		188/4 (68 overs) (f/o); Rahul Singh 70* (191); Saurabh Bandekar 3/30 (12 overs)

Match drawn
DRIEMS Ground, Cuttack
Umpires: Krishnamachari Bharatan and Amiesh Saheba
Player of the match: Sagun Kamat (Goa)

- Services won the toss and elected to field.
- Sumiran Amonkar (Goa) and Sachidanand Pandey (Services) both made their first-class debuts.
- Sagun Kamat became the first batsman for Goa to score a triple century.

20–23 October
Scorecard

Jammu & Kashmir	v	Andhra
334 (153 overs); Shubham Khajuria 90 (238); Duvvarapu Siva Kumar 4/49 (29 overs)		255 (99.3 overs); Dwaraka Ravi Teja 81 (194); Aamir Aziz 5/62 (33 overs)
111 (55 overs); Shubham Khajuria 49 (126); Bhargav Bhatt 5/60 (27 overs)		194/6 (49.3 overs); Dwaraka Ravi Teja 50 (73); Parvez Rasool 4/55 (21.3 overs)

Andhra won by 4 wickets
Brabourne Stadium, Mumbai
Umpires: Anil Dandekar and Abhijit Deshmukh
Player of the match: Bhargav Bhatt (Andhra)

- Andhra won the toss and elected to field.

=== Round 4 ===
27–30 October
Scorecard

Tripura	v	Goa
283 (80 overs); Rajat Dey 87 (104); Shadab Jakati 4/67 (23 overs)		269 (96.2 overs); Swapnil Asnodkar 57 (140); Gurinder Singh 4/46 (18.2 overs)
328/9d (95.2 overs); Gurinder Singh 103* (180); Shadab Jakati 5/86 (39.2 overs)		328/8 (71 overs); Sagun Kamat 78 (102); Rana Dutta 3/59 (16 overs)

Match drawn
KIIT Stadium, Bhubaneswar
Umpires: Ulhas Gandhe and Virender Sharma
Player of the match: Gurinder Singh (Tripura)

- Goa won the toss and elected to field.

27–30 October
Scorecard

Services	v	Jammu & Kashmir
477 (144.5 overs); Rahul Singh 182 (276); Parvez Rasool 5/117 (48.5 overs)		612/8 (197 overs); Ian Dev Singh 120 (240); Vikas Yadav 4/188 (66 overs)

Match drawn
Sawai Mansingh Stadium, Jaipur
Umpires: Abhijit Deshmukh and Belur Ravi
Player of the match: Parvez Rasool (Jammu & Kashmir)

- Services won the toss and elected to bat.
- Samiullah Beigh (Jammu & Kashmir) scored his maiden first-class century.

27–30 October
Scorecard

Kerala	v	Chhattisgarh
207 (71.2 overs); Rohan Prem 62 (117); Sumit Ruikar 5/50 (20.2 overs)		187 (96.4 overs); Abhimanyu Chauhan 37 (117); Karaparambil Monish 4/34 (18.4 overs)
307/2d (74 overs); Rohan Prem 123* (171); Sahil Gupta 1/32 (10 overs)		249/6 (107 overs); Sahil Gupta 123* (334); Jalaj Saxena 2/37 (21 overs)

Match drawn
JSCA International Stadium Complex, Ranchi
Umpires: Subrat Das and Amiesh Saheba
Player of the match: Sahil Gupta (Chhattisgarh)

- Kerala won the toss and elected to bat.
- Vishal Kushwah and Manoj Singh (Chhattisgarh) both made their first-class debuts.

27–30 October
Scorecard

Himachal Pradesh	v	Hyderabad
36 (25 overs); Rishi Dhawan 9 (16); Akash Bhandari 4/0 (3 overs)		126 (55.2 overs); Balchander Anirudh 64 (162); Rishi Dhawan 7/50 (22 overs)
301 (86.3 overs); Robin Bist 84 (171); Mohammed Siraj 3/50 (18 overs)		200/6 (54 overs); Kolla Sumanth 67 (108); Pankaj Jaswal 3/49 (9 overs)

Match drawn
Barsapara Cricket Stadium, Guwahati
Umpires: Sanjay Hazare and Nikhil Patwardhan
Player of the match: Balchander Anirudh (Hyderabad)

- Hyderabad won the toss and elected to field.
- Benjamin Thomas (Hyderabad) made his first-class debut.
- Himachal Pradesh made their lowest total in the Ranji Trophy.

27–30 October
Scorecard

Andhra	v	Haryana
253 (99.3 overs); Prasanth Kumar 74 (182); Yuzvendra Chahal 5/81 (34.3 overs)		103 (43.5 overs); Shubham Rohilla 27 (75); Siva Kumar 5/25 (14.5 overs)
220 (70.1 overs); Hanuma Vihari 50 (82); Mohit Sharma 3/37 (12.1 overs)		293 (123.2 overs); Shubham Rohilla 118 (274); Duvvarapu Siva Kumar 4/71 (32 overs)

Andhra won by 77 runs
Wankhede Stadium, Mumbai
Umpires: Sudhir Asnani and Krishnamachari Bharatan
Player of the match: Duvvarapu Siva Kumar (Andhra)

- Haryana won the toss and elected to field.
- Karthik Raman (Andhra) and Virender Dahiya (Haryana) both made their first-class debuts.

=== Round 5 ===
5–8 November
Scorecard

Hyderabad	v	Tripura

Match abandoned
Karnail Singh Stadium, Delhi
Umpires: Sanjeev Dua and Pashchim Pathak

- Smog pollution prevented any play from taking place.
- The BCCI originally rescheduled the match to take place after the conclusion of the group stage. However, this decision was revoked in December 2016, with both teams being awarded one point each.

5–8 November
Scorecard

Services	v	Andhra
446 (188.5 overs); Shamsher Yadav 136 (431); Dwaraka Ravi Teja 3/25 (13.5 overs)		341 (145.2 overs); Prasanth Kumar 110 (294); Azaruddin Bloch 5/92 (44.2 overs)
27/0 (6 overs); Anshul Gupta 17* (17)

Match drawn
Holkar Cricket Stadium, Indore
Umpires: Abhijit Deshmukh and Nikhil Patwardhan
Player of the match: Rahul Singh (Services)

- Services won the toss and elected to bat.

5–8 November
Scorecard

Jammu & Kashmir	v	Himachal Pradesh
162 (65.2 overs); Shubham Khajuria 48 (88); Mayank Dagar 4/33 (11.2 overs)		370 (98.5 overs); Paras Dogra 89 (170); Aamir Aziz 4/56 (18.5 overs)
417 (137 overs); Ian Dev Singh 99 (172); Bipul Sharma 4/87 (31 overs)		210/5 (44.3 overs); Robin Bist 52* (67); Samiullah Beigh 3/56 (12 overs)

Himachal Pradesh won by 5 wickets
JSCA International Stadium Complex, Ranchi
Umpires: Sadashiv Iyer and R. Sundar
Player of the match: Paras Dogra (Himachal Pradesh)

- Jammu & Kashmir won the toss and elected to bat.

5–8 November
Scorecard

Chhattisgarh	v	Goa
198 (71.3 overs); Amandeep Khare 60 (102); Rituraj Singh 6/60 (23 overs)		270 (108.5 overs); Samar Dubhashi 97 (283); Pankaj Rao 4/95 (32.5 overs)
162 (67.3 overs); Sahil Gupta 82 (201); Shadab Jakati 4/41 (21.3 overs)		94/2 (21.4 overs); Samar Dubhashi 41* (61); Kant Singh 1/23 (6 overs)

Goa won by 8 wickets
Barabati Stadium, Cuttack
Umpires: Anil Chaudhary and Subrat Das
Player of the match: Shadab Jakati (Goa)

- Goa won the toss and elected to field.
- Abhishek Singh (Chhattisgarh) made his first-class debut.
- In Chhattisgarh's second innings, seven batsmen were dismissed for a duck, the joint-most in one innings in a Ranji Trophy match.

5–8 November
Scorecard

Haryana	v	Kerala
303 (109.1 overs); Rohit Sharma 92 (196); Sandeep Warrier 5/80 (32.1 overs)		404/9d (139.2 overs); Bhavin Thakkar 79 (270); Harshal Patel 4/63 (25 overs)
315/3 (88 overs); Nitin Saini 152* (272); Jalaj Saxena 2/52 (22 overs)

Match drawn
Sawai Mansingh Stadium, Jaipur
Umpires: Vineet Kulkarni and Tapan Sharma
Player of the match: Sandeep Warrier (Kerala)

- Kerala won the toss and elected to field.
- Vinod Kumar and Vishnu Vinod (Kerala) both made their first-class debuts.

=== Round 6 ===
13–16 November
Scorecard

Kerala	v	Goa
342 (105.4 overs); Rohan Prem 130 (300); Rituraj Singh 7/42 (27 overs)		286 (99.1 overs); Shadab Jakati 85 (162); Vinod Kumar 4/68 (24.1 overs)
257/8d (67 overs); Rohan Prem 70 (159); Saurabh Bandekar 5/70 (18 overs)		279/5 (63 overs); Sagun Kamat 151 (176); Iqbal Abdulla 4/66 (16 overs)

Match drawn
Brabourne Stadium, Mumbai
Umpires: Abhijit Deshmukh and Ulhas Gandhe
Player of the match: Rohan Prem (Kerala)

- Goa won the toss and elected to field.

13–16 November
Scorecard

Haryana	v	Jammu & Kashmir
502 (147.5 overs); Rajat Paliwal 194 (328); Parvez Rasool 3/77 (29 overs)		262 (88.1 overs); Pranav Gupta 94 (189); Sanjay Pahal 4/66 (21.1 overs)
		249/3 (100 overs) (f/o); Shubham Khajuria 110 (292); Mohit Sharma 3/21 (14 overs)

Match drawn
Barabati Stadium, Cuttack
Umpires: Krishnamachari Bharatan and Nand Kishore
Player of the match: Rajat Paliwal (Haryana)

- Jammu & Kashmir won the toss and elected to field.
- Shivam Chauhan (Haryana) made his first-class debut.

13–16 November
Scorecard

Tripura	v	Andhra
171 (58.1 overs); Bunti Roy 34 (44); Paidikalva Vijaykumar 4/56 (23 overs)		524/6d (167 overs); Hanuma Vihari 233* (482); Gurinder Singh 4/166 (47 overs)
315 (100.4 overs); Yashpal Singh 59 (90); Paidikalva Vijaykumar 4/84 (36.4 overs)

Andhra won by an innings and 38 runs
Sardar Vallabhbhai Patel Stadium, Valsad
Umpires: Sanjeev Dua and Nikhil Patwardhan
Player of the match: Hanuma Vihari (Andhra)

- Andhra won the toss and elected to field.

13–16 November
Scorecard

Chhattisgarh	v	Himachal Pradesh
238 (98.5 overs); Amandeep Khare 85 (188); Bipul Sharma 3/52 (27 overs)		314 (114.2 overs); Bipul Sharma 86 (179); Sumit Ruikar 7/112 (39 overs)
309/9d (91 overs); Abhimanyu Chauhan 109 (225); Gurvinder Singh 3/64 (16 overs)		139/7 (54.0 overs); Rishi Dhawan 41* (64); Ajay Mandal 3/51 (20 overs)

Match drawn
Green Park, Kanpur
Umpires: Jayaraman Madanagopal and Sundaram Ravi
Player of the match: Bipul Sharma (Himachal Pradesh)

- Chhattisgarh won the toss and elected to bat.
- Avnish Dhaliwal and Anupam Toppo (Chhattisgarh) both made their first-class debuts.

13–16 November
Scorecard

Hyderabad	v	Services
580/9d (156.5 overs); Bavanaka Sandeep 203* (332); Raushan Raj 5/73 (27.5 overs)		360 (106.5 overs); Shamsher Yadav 104 (196); Mohammed Siraj 3/65 (21.5 overs)
20/0 (4.5 overs); Akshath Reddy 15* (15)		239 (72.1 overs) (f/o); Rahul Singh 59 (67); Ravi Kiran 4/32 (17 overs)

Hyderabad won by 10 wickets
Bandra Kurla Complex, Mumbai
Umpires: Nitin Pandit and Rohan Pandit
Player of the match: Bavanaka Sandeep (Hyderabad)

- Services won the toss and elected to field.
- This fixture was originally scheduled to be held in Delhi, but was moved due to concerns about smog pollution.

=== Round 7 ===
21–24 November
Scorecard

Hyderabad	v	Chhattisgarh
351 (126.3 overs); Subramaniam Badrinath 134 (254); Pankaj Rao 5/89 (36.3 overs)		188 (85.1 overs); Sahil Gupta 55 (138); Akash Bhandari 3/27 (8.1 overs)
122 (48.2 overs); Akash Bhandari 35 (51); Pankaj Rao 5/44 (16.2 overs)		241 (84.1 overs); Ashutosh Singh 67 (144); Ravi Kiran 4/60 (20 overs)

Hyderabad won by 44 runs
Sardar Vallabhbhai Patel Stadium, Valsad
Umpires: Umesh Dubey and Amiesh Saheba
Player of the match: Pankaj Rao (Chhattisgarh)

- Chhattisgarh won the toss and elected to field.

21–24 November
Scorecard

Kerala	v	Andhra
219 (98.4 overs); Mohammed Azharuddeen 82 (201); Paidikalva Vijaykumar 6/47 (31 overs)		226 (96.3 overs); Ricky Bhui 62 (149); Basil Thampi 3/33 (17.3 overs)
302/6d (71 overs); Rohan Prem 89 (149); Paidikalva Vijaykumar 3/67 (16 overs)		193/4 (80 overs); Srikar Bharat 73 (170); Vinod Kumar 1/25 (10 overs)

Match drawn
Barsapara Cricket Stadium, Guwahati
Umpires: Navdeep Singh and Rohan Pandit
Player of the match: Paidikalva Vijaykumar (Andhra)

- Andhra won the toss and elected to field.

21–24 November
Scorecard

Goa	v	Haryana
413 (144.1 overs); Snehal Kauthankar 225 (374); Harshal Patel 4/75 (26.1 overs)		568 (160.2 overs); Nitin Saini 227 (442); Amulaya Pandrekar 3/116 (41 overs)
152/5 (58 overs); Sumiran Amonkar 57* (157); Amit Mishra 3/69 (25 overs)

Match drawn
Green Park, Kanpur
Umpires: Subrat Das and Nitin Pandit
Player of the match: Nitin Saini (Haryana)

- Haryana won the toss and elected to field.

21–24 November
Scorecard

Jammu & Kashmir	v	Tripura
315 (107.2 overs); Aditya Singh 74 (177); Manisankar Murasingh 4/75 (32.2 overs)		297 (98 overs); Bishal Ghosh 95 (219); Parvez Rasool 3/67 (25 overs)
318/4d (90 overs); Ian Dev Singh 129* (180); Abhijit Dey 2/53 (16 overs)		168/8 (59 overs); Rajat Dey 53* (124); Ram Dayal 3/61 (19 overs)

Match drawn
Bandra Kurla Complex, Mumbai
Umpires: K. N. Ananthapadmanabhan and Saiyed Khalid
Player of the match: Ian Dev Singh (Jammu & Kashmir)

- Tripura won the toss and elected to field.

21–24 November
Scorecard

Services	v	Himachal Pradesh
401 (126.2 overs); Ravi Chauhan 149 (247); Rishi Dhawan 5/82 (30 overs)		296 (85.5 overs); Paras Dogra 70 (118); Anshul Gupta 3/20 (8 overs)
295/9d (84.1 overs); Anshul Gupta 60 (115); Mayank Dagar 4/61 (22.1 overs)		145/2 (45 overs); Prashant Chopra 66 (89); Raj Bahadur 1/30 (9 overs)

Match drawn
Lalabhai Contractor Stadium, Surat
Umpires: R. Sundar and Sivasubramaniyan Shankar
Player of the match: Nakul Verma (Services)

- Services won the toss and elected to bat.

=== Round 8 ===
29 November–2 December
Scorecard

Tripura	v	Kerala
213 (79.5 overs); Yashpal Singh 50 (99); Sandeep Warrier 3/34 (16 overs)		193 (72.2 overs); Mohammed Azharuddeen 40 (58); Sanjay Majumder 4/43 (17 overs)
162 (70.1 overs); Smit Patel 54 (124); Akshay Chandran 4/16 (7.1 overs)		183/3 (51.4 overs); Mohammed Azharuddeen 99 (125); Gurinder Singh 3/40 (14.4 overs)

Kerala won by 7 wickets
Barabati Stadium, Cuttack
Umpires: Rohan Pandit and Virender Sharma
Player of the match: Mohammed Azharuddeen (Kerala)

- Tripura won the toss and elected to bat.
- Aniruddha Saha (Tripura) made his first-class debut.

29 November–2 December
Scorecard

Hyderabad	v	Jammu & Kashmir
328 (131.3 overs); Tanmay Agarwal 119 (321); Parvez Rasool 4/63 (43.3 overs)		169 (55.3 overs); Parvez Rasool 70 (81); Ravi Kiran 4/32 (15 overs)
244/2d (57 overs); Tanmay Agarwal 103* (183); Samiullah Beigh 1/57 (12 overs)		117 (37.2 overs); Ram Dayal 33 (71); Chama Milind 4/39 (12 overs)

Hyderabad won by 286 runs
Moti Bagh Stadium, Vadodara
Umpires: Kamlesh Sharma and Tapan Sharma
Player of the match: Tanmay Agarwal (Hyderabad)

- Jammu and Kashmir won the toss and elected to field.
- Ahmed Bandy and Suhail Andleev (Jammu and Kashmir) both made their first-class debuts.

29 November–2 December
Scorecard

Goa	v	Andhra
115 (52.4 overs); Sumiran Amonkar 29 (83); Bhargav Bhatt 6/36 (21 overs)		159 (34.3 overs); Srikar Bharat 68 (67); Shadab Jakati 8/53 (17.3 overs)
276 (62.3 overs); Saurabh Bandekar 75 (79); Hanuma Vihari 3/17 (8.2 overs)		198 (59.2 overs); Ricky Bhui 71 (131); Rituraj Singh 4/24 (7.2 overs)

Goa won by 34 runs
Railway Stadium, Dhanbad
Umpires: Vineet Kulkarni and Pashchim Pathak
Player of the match: Shadab Jakati (Goa)

- Andhra won the toss and elected to field.
- Bukkapatnam Siddharth (Andhra) made his first-class debut.

29 November–2 December
Scorecard

Services	v	Chhattisgarh
225 (85.1 overs); Nakul Verma 54 (167); Sumit Ruikar 5/73 (33.1 overs)		281 (90.4 overs); Manoj Singh 67 (65); Diwesh Pathania 6/78 (27 overs)
336/7d (82 overs); Nakul Verma 156* (224); Pankaj Rao 3/64 (19 overs)		266 (92.3 overs); Sahil Gupta 87 (243); Diwesh Pathania 4/67 (24.3 overs)

Services won by 18 Runs
Bandra Kurla Complex, Mumbai
Umpires: Anil Dandekar and Krishnaraj Srinath
Player of the match: Diwesh Pathania (Services)

- Services won the toss and elected to bat.
- Shivendra Singh (Chhattisgarh) made his first-class debut.

29 November–2 December
Scorecard

Haryana	v	Himachal Pradesh
402 (127 overs); Guntashveer Singh 120 (254); Kanwar Abhinay 4/73 (34 overs)		233 (88.5 overs); Sumeet Verma 66 (167); Sanjay Pahal 5/71 (28.4 overs)
162/3 (37.5 overs); Shubham Rohilla 100* (108); Kanwar Abhinay 2/43 (11 overs)		432/5d (88 overs) (f/o); Prashant Chopra 237 (241); Rahul Tewatia 3/109 (20 overs)

Match drawn
Sardar Vallabhbhai Patel Stadium, Valsad
Umpires: Jayaraman Madanagopal and S. Shankar
Player of the match: Guntashveer Singh (Haryana)

- Himachal Pradesh won the toss and elected to field.
- Poonish Mehta, Guntashveer Singh (Haryana) and R. I. Thakur (Himachal Pradesh) all made their first-class debuts.

=== Round 9 ===
7–10 December
Scorecard

Services	v	Kerala
322 (102.1 overs); Anshul Gupta 105 (222); Athif Bin Ashraf 4/60 (17 overs)		518/5d (161 overs); Sachin Baby 250* (425); Irfan Khan 3/118 (37.1 overs)

Match drawn
Karnail Singh Stadium, Delhi
Umpires: Pashchim Pathak and Sanjeev Dua
Player of the match: Sachin Baby (Kerala)

- Kerala won the toss and elected to field.
- Athif Bin Ashraf (Kerala) made his first-class debut.

7–10 December
Scorecard

Andhra	v	Hyderabad
190 (59 overs); Mudi Prajith 63 (88); Chama Milind 5/28 (16 overs)		143 (74.5 overs); Chama Milind 29* (66); Paidikalva Vijaykumar 4/40 (24 overs)
171/6d (29.3 overs); Hanuma Vihari 57 (54); Mohammed Siraj 4/52 (8.3 overs)		56/5 (47.0 overs); Subramaniam Badrinath 14* (83); Paidikalva Vijaykumar 2/13 (19 overs)

Match drawn
Lucknow International Cricket Stadium, Lucknow
Umpires: Anil Dandekar and Nikhil Patwardhan
Player of the match: Mudi Prajith (Andhra)

- Hyderabad won the toss and elected to field.
- Mudi Prajith (Andhra) made his first-class debut.

7–10 December
Scorecard

Goa	v	Himachal Pradesh
380 (133 overs); Darshan Misal 106 (231); Akshay Chauhan 3/80 (24 overs)		528 (97.2 overs); Prashant Chopra 194 (170); Rituraj Singh 3/89 (17 overs)
286 (84.4 overs); Darshan Misal 119 (200); Gurvinder Singh 4/82 (24.4 overs)		139/3 (27.2 overs); Paras Dogra 55* (69); Amulaya Pandrekar 2/31 (8.2 overs)

Himachal Pradesh won by 7 wickets
Bandra Kurla Complex, Mumbai
Umpires: Tapan Sharma and Vineet Kulkarni
Player of the match: Prashant Chopra (Himachal Pradesh)

- Goa won the toss and elected to bat.
- Srinivas Fadte (Goa) made his first-class debut.

7–10 December
Scorecard

Chhattisgarh	v	Jammu & Kashmir
370 (103.4 overs); Amandeep Khare 106 (144); Samiullah Beigh 5/94 (25.4 overs)		242 (77.1 overs); Parvez Rasool 92 (143); Sumit Ruikar 5/59 (21.1 overs)
264/3d (53 overs); Amandeep Khare 117* (91); Parvez Rasool 3/56 (13 overs)		243/7 (78.0 overs); Shubham Khajuria 72 (102); Ajay Mandal 3/60 (19 overs)

Match drawn
Captain Roop Singh Stadium, Gwalior
Umpires: Chirra Ravikanthreddy and Ravi Subramanian
Player of the match: Amandeep Khare (Chhattisgarh)

- Jammu and Kashmir won the toss and elected to field.
- Shahnawaz Hussain (Chhattisgarh) and Mohsin Mufti (Jammu and Kashmir) made their first-class debuts.

7–10 December
Scorecard

Haryana	v	Tripura
231 (66.4 overs); Chaitanya Bishnoi 52 (83); Sanjay Majumder 3/53 (13 overs)		178 (58 overs); Smit Patel 102 (151); Harshal Patel 5/27 (17 overs)
261/9d (66.4 overs); Nitin Saini 104 (117); Bunti Roy 4/42 (17 overs)		195 (40.4 overs); Gurinder Singh 62 (45); Sanjay Pahal 3/47 (10.4 overs)

Haryana won by 119 runs
Eden Gardens, Kolkata
Umpires: Belur Ravi and Krishnamachari Bharatan
Player of the match: Harshal Patel (Haryana)

- Tripura won the toss and elected to field.

== See also ==
- 2016–17 Ranji Trophy
- 2016–17 Ranji Trophy Group A
- 2016–17 Ranji Trophy Group B
