= 2020–21 Syed Mushtaq Ali Trophy Group C =

Cricket tournament

2019–20 Syed Mushtaq Ali Trophy Group C
- Dates: 10 – 18 January 2021
- Administrator: BCCI
- Cricket format: Twenty20 cricket
- Tournament format: Round-robin
- Participants: 6

The 2020–21 Syed Mushtaq Ali Trophy was the twelfth season of the Syed Mushtaq Ali Trophy, a Twenty20 cricket tournament played in India. It was contested by 38 teams, divided into six groups, with six teams in Group C. Baroda, Chhattisgarh, Gujarat, Himachal Pradesh, Maharashtra and Uttarakhand were placed in Group C, with all the matches taking place in Vadodara. Baroda won Group C to qualify for the knockout stage of the tournament. Himachal Pradesh also qualified for the quarter-finals, finishing as one of the best two second placed teams across groups A to E.

== Points table ==
Team	Pld	W	L	T	NR	Pts	NRR
Baroda (Q)	5	5	0	0	0	20	+1.465
Himachal Pradesh (Q)	5	4	1	0	0	16	+0.940
Gujarat	5	3	2	0	0	12	+0.891
Uttarakhand	5	1	4	0	0	4	–0.981
Maharashtra	5	1	4	0	0	4	–1.169
Chhattisgarh	5	1	4	0	0	4	–1.390

- Top team advanced to the Knockout Stage

== Fixtures ==
=== Round 1 ===
10 January 2021
Scorecard

Himachal Pradesh; 173/5 (20 overs)	v	Chhattisgarh; 141/8 (20 overs)
Ravi Thakur 53 (36); Vishal Kushwah 3/18 (3 overs)		Amandeep Khare 87* (60); Rishi Dhawan 3/29 (4 overs)

Himachal Pradesh won by 32 runs
F. B. Colony Ground, Vadodara
Umpires: Nand Kishore and Ranjeev Sharma

- Chhattisgarh won the toss and elected to field.
- Anand Rao, Shahbaz Hussain (Chhattisgarh), Ravi Thakur and Vaibhav Arora (Himachal Pradesh) all made their T20 debuts.

10 January 2021
Scorecard

Baroda; 168/7 (20 overs)	v	Uttarakhand; 163/6 (20 overs)
Krunal Pandya 76 (42); Akash Madhwal 3/16 (4 overs)		Dikshanshu Negi 77* (57); Krunal Pandya 2/33 (4 overs)

Baroda won by 5 runs
Reliance Stadium, Vadodara
Umpires: Amit Bansal and Krishnamachari Srinivasan

- Uttarakhand won the toss and elected to field.
- Abhimanyusingh Rajput, Bhanu Pania, Chinta Gandhi (Baroda), Kunal Chandela and Piyush Joshi (Uttarakhand) all made their T20 debuts.

10 January 2021
Scorecard

Gujarat; 157/8 (20 overs)	v	Maharashtra; 128 (19.3 overs)
Axar Patel 30 (23); Mukesh Choudhary 3/33 (4 overs)		Naushad Shaikh 31 (33); Arzan Nagwaswalla 6/19 (3.3 overs)

Gujarat won by 29 runs
Moti Bagh Stadium, Vadodara
Umpires: Abhijit Bengeri and GS Ananth Ramakrishnan

- Maharashtra won the toss and elected to field.

=== Round 2 ===
12 January 2021
Scorecard

Chhattisgarh; 192/5 (20 overs)	v	Maharashtra; 196/2 (20 overs)
Rishabh Tiwari 44 (30); Manoj Ingale 2/43 (4 overs)		Kedar Jadhav 84* (45); Veer Pratap Singh 1/23 (4 overs)

Maharashtra won by 8 wickets
F. B. Colony Ground, Vadodara
Umpires: Saiyed Khalid and VM Dhokre

- Chhattisgarh won the toss and elected to bat.
- Shourabh Kharwar (Chhattisgarh) made his T20 debut.

12 January 2021
Scorecard

Gujarat; 172/5 (20 overs)	v	Uttarakhand; 99/8 (20 overs)
Priyank Panchal 46 (36); Dikshanshu Negi 2/25 (4 overs)		Jay Bista 26 (29); Piyush Chawla 3/12 (4 overs)

Gujarat won by 73 runs
Moti Bagh Stadium, Vadodara
Umpires: Abhijit Bengeri and GS Ananth Ramakrishnan

- Uttarakhand won the toss and elected to field.
- Nikhil Kohli (Uttarakhand) made his T20 debut.

12 January 2021
Scorecard

Himachal Pradesh; 109 (20 overs)	v	Baroda; 112/6 (19 overs)
Prashant Chopra 39 (36); Babashafi Pathan 3/9 (3 overs)		Kedar Devdhar 49* (53); Vaibhav Arora 2/34 (4 overs)

Baroda won by 4 wickets
Reliance Stadium, Vadodara
Umpires: Nand Kishore and Ranjeev Sharma

- Baroda won the toss and elected to field.

=== Round 3 ===
14 January 2021
Scorecard

Himachal Pradesh; 141/5 (20 overs)	v	Gujarat; 115 (19.4 overs)
Rishi Dhawan 43 (34); Axar Patel 1/16 (3 overs)		Piyush Chawla 39 (27); Vaibhav Arora 3/16 (3.4 overs)

Himachal Pradesh won by 26 runs
Moti Bagh Stadium, Vadodara
Umpires: Saiyed Khalid and VM Dhokre

- Gujarat won the toss and elected to field.
- Digvijay Rangi (Himachal Pradesh) and Priyesh Patel (Gujarat) both made their T20 debuts.

14 January 2021
Scorecard

Maharashtra; 141/4 (20 overs)	v	Uttarakhand; 145/4 (19.1 overs)
Kedar Jadhav 61 (47); Dikshanshu Negi 1/18 (4 overs)		Jay Bista 69* (51); Divyang Hinganekar 1/11 (2 overs)

Uttarakhand won by 6 wickets
Reliance Stadium, Vadodara
Umpires: Abhijit Bengeri and GS Ananth Ramakrishnan

- Maharashtra won the toss and elected to bat.

14 January 2021
Scorecard

Chhattisgarh; 90 (17.3 overs)	v	Baroda; 91/1 (12.3 overs)
Shashank Chandrakar 20 (11); Lukman Meriwala 5/8 (3.3 overs)		Kedar Devdhar 44* (41); Sourabh Majumdar 1/12 (2 overs)

Baroda won by 9 wickets
F. B. Colony Ground, Vadodara
Umpires: Amit Bansal and Krishnamachari Srinivasan

- Baroda won the toss and elected to field.
- Sourabh Majumdar (Chhattisgarh) made his T20 debut.

=== Round 4 ===
16 January 2021
Scorecard

Uttarakhand; 128/6 (20 overs)	v	Himachal Pradesh; 130/0 (15.4 overs)
Jay Bista 30 (21); Pankaj Jaswal 4/15 (4 overs)		Abhimanyu Rana 72* (53)

Himachal Pradesh won by 10 wickets
Reliance Stadium, Vadodara
Umpires: Nand Kishore and Ranjeev Sharma

- Himachal Pradesh won the toss and elected to field.

16 January 2021
Scorecard

Baroda; 158/4 (20 overs)	v	Maharashtra; 98 (16.5 overs)
Kedar Devdhar 99* (71); Taranjitsingh Dhillon 2/30 (4 overs)		Naushad Shaikh 32 (43); Atit Sheth 4/17 (3.5 overs)

Baroda won by 60 runs
Moti Bagh Stadium, Vadodara
Umpires: Amit Bansal and Krishnamachari Srinivasan

- Rajvardhan Hangargekar and Ranjeet Nikam (Maharashtra) both made their T20 debuts.

16 January 2021
Scorecard

Chhattisgarh; 63/3 (5 overs)	v	Gujarat; 64/2 (3.4 overs)
Vishal Kushwah 20* (7); Piyush Chawla 2/10 (1 over)		Ripal Patel 32 (9); Sourabh Majumdar 2/18 (1.4 overs)

Gujarat won by 8 wickets
F. B. Colony Ground, Vadodara
Umpires: Saiyed Khalid and VM Dhokre

- Gujarat won the toss and elected to field.
- The match was reduced to 5 overs per side due to rain.
- Binny Samual and Parivesh Dhar (Chhattisgarh) both made their T20 debuts.

=== Round 5 ===
18 January 2021
Scorecard

Baroda; 174/6 (20 overs)	v	Gujarat; 164/9 (20 overs)
Vishnu Solanki 59* (33); Axar Patel 2/13 (4 overs)		Dhruv Raval 41 (27); Bhargav Bhatt 2/28 (4 overs)

Baroda won by 12 runs
F. B. Colony Ground, Vadodara
Umpires: Abhijit Bengeri and GS Ananth Ramakrishnan

- Gujarat won the toss and elected to field.

18 January 2021
Scorecard

Maharashtra; 117/9 (20 overs)	v	Himachal Pradesh; 121/6 (18.5 overs)
Ruturaj Gaikwad 33 (31); Rishi Dhawan 3/22 (4 overs)		Rishi Dhawan 61* (48); Azim Kazi 2/10 (4 overs)

Himachal Pradesh won by 4 wickets
Moti Bagh Stadium, Vadodara
Umpires: Amit Bansal and Krishnamachari Srinivasan

- Maharashtra won the toss and elected to bat.
- Mani Sharma (Himachal Pradesh) and Vishant More (Maharashtra) both made their T20 debuts.

18 January 2021
Scorecard

Uttarakhand; 167/8 (20 overs)	v	Chhattisgarh; 167/9 (20 overs)
Jay Bista 92 (60); Sourabh Majumdar 3/35 (4 overs)		Vishal Kushwah 37 (21); Akash Madhwal 2/17 (4 overs)

Match tied
(Chhattisgarh won the Super Over)
Reliance Stadium, Vadodara
Umpires: Nand Kishore and Ranjeev Sharma

- Chhattisgarh won the toss and elected to field.
- Agrim Tiwari (Uttarakhand) and Sanidhya Hurkat (Chhattisgarh) both made their T20 debuts.
