= List of Chhattisgarh cricketers =

Cricketers who have played for Chhattisgarh in senior matches

This is a list of all cricketers who have played in first-class, List A or Twenty20 matches for Chhattisgarh, mostly in the Ranji Trophy (FC), Vijay Hazare Trophy (LA), and Syed Mushtaq Ali Trophy (T20) competitions. Seasons given are the first and last in which each player represented Chhattisgarh, but they may not have played in all the interim seasons and many played for other senior teams besides Chhattisgarh. Players in bold have played international cricket. As one of several expansion teams, Chhattisgarh made their senior competition debut in the 2016/17 season.

Last updated 26 December 2023.

== A ==
Name	Seasons	Notes	Refs
Abhishek Singh	2016/17		
Abhuday Singh	2016/17–2018/19	Born 1989. Right-arm medium pace bowler who played in 15 matches (6 FC, 4 LA, 5 T20) for Chhattisgarh.	
Shubham Agarwal	2016/17–		
Ashutosh Singh	2016/17–		

== B ==
- V. Bareth, 2022/23
- H. S. Bhatia, 2018/19–
- P. Bhima Rao, 2018/19
- M. L. Binny Samual, 2020/21
- J. P. Butte, 2023/24

== C ==
- S. Chandrakar, 2017/18–
- S. M. Chandrakar, 2017/18
- A. R. Chauhan, 2016/17–2019/20
- A. Chouhan, 2023/24
- L. K. Coster, 2018/19–2022/23

== D ==
- P. M. Datey, 2019/20
- S. J. Desai, 2017/18–
- A. S. Dhaliwal, 2016/17–2022/23
- P. P. Dhar, 2020/21
- R. K. Dhruv, 2016/17–2017/18
- S. Dubey, 2023/24

== G ==
- G. Gagandeep Singh, 2023/24
- S. S. Gupta, 2016/17–2018/19

== H ==
- A. A. Herwadkar, 2021/22–2022/23
- S. S. Hurkat, 2017/18–

== J ==
- Jiwanjot Singh, 2019/20–2020/21

== K ==
Name	Seasons	Notes	Refs
**Mohammad Kaif**	2016/17–2017/18	Born 1980. Right-handed batter and occasional off spinner who was an exceptional field, especially at cover. Played for India in only 13 Tests from 2000 to 2006, but was an ODI regular with 125 appearances. Began at Uttar Pradesh and played for several teams, Chhattisgarh being the last before he retired in 2018.	

- E. D. Kerkar, 2023/24
- A. N. Khare, 2016/17–
- S. S. Kharwar, 2016/17–2020/21
- V. S. Kushwah, 2016/17–2021/22

== M ==
- S. J. Majumdar, 2020/21–
- A. J. Mandal, 2016/17–
- Manoj Singh, 2016/17–2022/23
- A. Mourya, 2018/19–2022/23

== N ==
- V. C. Naidu, 2016/17
- V. Nitish Rao, 2017/18

== P ==
- A. S. Pandey, 2022/23
- Pawandeep Singh, 2018/19
- V. Pratap Singh, 2019/20–2021/22

== R ==
- V. S. Rajput, 2018/19
- A. G. Rao, 2020/21
- P. K. Rao, 2016/17–2022/23
- M. Ravi Kiran, 2020/21–2022/23
- S. S. Ruikar, 2016/17–

== S ==
- Sahban Khan, 2017/18–2022/23
- P. Sai Painkra, 2023/24
- Jatin S. Saxena, 2017/18–2018/19
- Shahnawaz Hussain, 2016/17–2022/23
- Shakeeb Ahmed, 2016/17–2019/20
- Shivendra Singh, 2016/17–2018/19
- A. Shubham Singh, 2017/18–
- S. S. Singh, 2019/20–
- A. Singh Thakur, 2022/23–
- P. R. Sinha, 2016/17–2017/18

== T ==
- A. Tamrakar, 2016/17
- A. S. Thakur, 2023/24
- S. V. Thakur, 2016/17
- R. B. Tiwari, 2016/17–
- A. G. Tiwary, 2018/19–
- A. A. Toppo, 2016/17

== V ==
- M. Verma, 2022/23
- O. Verma, 2016/17–2019/20

== Y ==
- D. Yadav, 2023/24
- M. Yadav, 2022/23–
- P. M. Yadav, 2022/23
