= List of Goa cricketers =

This is a list of cricketers who have played first-class, List A or Twenty20 cricket for Goa.

== A ==
- Felix Alemao (20/7/1995 – )
- Guru Amonkar ( – )
- Sumiran Amonkar (28/7/1991 – )
- Pravin Amre (14/8/1968 – )
- J. Arunkumar (18/1/1975 – )
- Rohit Asnodkar (5/12/1986 – )
- Swapnil Asnodkar (29/3/1984 – )
- Hemant Angle (13/08/1958 – )

== B ==
- Saurabh Bandekar (16/11/1987 – )
- Yeshwant Barde (15/2/1973 – )
- Rohan Belekar (27/10/1987 – )
- Roger Binny (19/7/1955 – )
- Manvinder Bisla (27/12/1984 – )

== C ==
- V. B. Chandrasekhar (21/8/1961 – )

== D ==
- Amogh Sunil Desai (26/8/1992 – )
- Ashok Dinda (24/03/1984 – )
- Suraj Dongre (27/12/1989 – )
- Robin D'Souza (2/5/1980 – )
- Samar Dubhashi (22/9/1995 – )

== F ==
- Srinivas Fadte (10/10/1993 – )

== G ==
- Harshad Hanumant Gadekar (5/12/1986 – )
- Deepraj Gaonkar (4/4/1998 – )
- Gauresh Gawas (8/12/1990 – )
- Prathamesh Gawas (10/5/1994 – )
- Rajesh Ghodge (1997-2005)
- D. J. Gokulakrishnan (4/1/1973 – )

== H ==
- Nikhil Haldipur (19/12/1977 – )

== J ==
- Vivek Jaisimha (18/3/1964 – )
- Shadab Jakati (27/11/1980 – )
- Manoj Joglekar (1/11/1973 – )

== K ==
- Rana Kalangutkar (19/10/1982 – )
- Sagun Kamat (11/5/1983 – )
- Snehal Kauthankar (19/10/1995 – )
- Rahul Keni ( – )
- Saiyed Khalid (21/10/1975 – )sudin Kamat

== M ==
- Buddhadev Mangaldas (20/6/1988 – )
- Darshan Misal (11/9/1992 – ) Balkrishna Misquin Paresh Misquin

Mahendra S Pai Kuchelkar

== N ==
- Mahind Naik (---)
- Raj Naik (20/12/1974 – )
- Ganeshraj Narvekar (2/2/1993 – )
- Ryan Ninan (19/11/1985 – )

== P ==
- Shikha Pandey (12/5/1989 – )
- Amulaya Pandrekar (31/3/1996 – )
- Heramb Parab (4/9/1998 – )
- Kiran Powar (6/4/1976 – )
- Nilesh Prabhudesai (13/5/1967 – )
- Suyash Prabhudessai (6/12/1997 – ) Sharad Pednekar Raju Pednekar

== R ==
- DC Rajesh (28/3/1975 – )
- Ajay Ratra (13/12/1981 – )
- Abhishek Raut (3/3/1987 – )

== S ==
- Sathiamoorty Saravanan (22/9/1978 – )
- Faisal Shaikh (2/12/1977 – )
- Somashekar Shiraguppi (14/6/1974 – )
- Malik Shirur (21/1/1993 – )
- Ravikant Shukla (9/7/1987 – )
- Vidyut Sivaramakrishnan (3/12/1981 – )
- Sridharan Sriram (21/2/1976 – )

== V ==
- Keenan Vaz (12/9/1991 – )
- Ganapathi Vignesh (11/8/1981 – )

== Y ==
- Amit Yadav (10/10/1989 – )
- Sher Yadav (4/12/1984 – )

== See also ==
- Goans in cricket
