= 2021–22 Ranji Trophy Group H =

Cricket tournament

- Dates: 17 February – 26 June 2022
- Administrator(s): BCCI
- Cricket format: First-class cricket
- Tournament format(s): Round-robin then knockout
- Participants: 4

The 2021–22 Ranji Trophy was the 87th season of the Ranji Trophy, the premier first-class cricket tournament in India. It was contested by 38 teams, divided into eight groups, with four teams in Group H. All the Group H league matches took place in Guwahati. The tournament was announced by the Board of Control for Cricket in India (BCCI) on 3 July 2021. Jharkhand won Group H to progress to the knockout stage of the tournament.

== Points table ==
Pos	Team	Pld	W	L	T	D	NR	Pts	Quot
1	Jharkhand	3	2	1	0	0	0	12	0.958
2	Chhattisgarh	3	1	0	0	2	0	10	0.906
3	Tamil Nadu	3	0	1	0	2	0	6	1.035
4	Delhi	3	0	1	0	2	0	2	1.069

Updated to match(es) played on 6 March 2022. Source: ESPN Cricinfo

Advances to Preliminary quarter-final

== Fixtures ==
=== Round 1 ===
17–20 February 2022
Scorecard

Delhi	v	Tamil Nadu
452 (141.2 overs); Lalit Yadav 177 (287); M. Mohammed 4/75 (23 overs)		494 (107.5 overs); Shahrukh Khan 194 (148); Vikas Mishra 6/108 (31.5 overs)
228/0 (60.5 overs); Yash Dhull 113* (202)

Match drawn
Barsapara Cricket Stadium, Guwahati
Umpires: Premdip Chatterjee and Ravi Shankar
Player of the match: Shahrukh Khan (Tamil Nadu)

- Tamil Nadu won the toss and elected to field.
- Kuldip Yadav, Yash Dhull (Delhi) and P Saravana Kumar (Tamil Nadu) all made their first-class debuts.
- Yash Dhull (Delhi) scored his maiden century in first-class cricket.
- Lalit Yadav (Delhi) scored his maiden century in first-class cricket.

17–20 February 2022
Scorecard

Jharkhand	v	Chhattisgarh
169 (51.3 overs); Kumar Deobrat 34 (74); Ajay Mandal 4/47 (14.3 overs)		174 (51.1 overs); Shashank Singh 43 (58); Sushant Mishra 5/27 (8 overs)
133 (49.2 overs); Utkarsh Singh 42 (112); Sumit Ruikar 4/29 (11 overs)		129/2 (25.2 overs); Akhil Herwadkar 62* (80); Ashish Kumar 1/21 (7 overs)

Chhattisgarh won by 8 wickets
Nehru Stadium, Guwahati
Umpires: Anish Sahasrabudhe and Yeshwant Barde
Player of the match: Ajay Mandal (Chhattisgarh)

- Jharkhand won the toss and elected to bat.
- Sanidhya Hurkat, Shahbaz Hussain, Sourabh Majumdar (Chhattisgarh) and Sushant Mishra (Jharkhand) all made their first-class debuts.

=== Round 2 ===
24–27 February 2022
Scorecard

Jharkhand	v	Delhi
251 (70 overs); Virat Singh 103 (171); Navdeep Saini 3/37 (12 overs)		224 (101.2 overs); Jonty Sidhu 79 (183); Shahbaz Nadeem 5/58 (24.2 overs)
307/7d (78 overs); Kumar Suraj 131* (162); Nitish Rana 3/47 (11 overs)		319 (77.4 overs); Dhruv Shorey 136 (177); Shahbaz Nadeem 5/83 (31 overs)

Jharkhand won by 15 runs
Barsapara Cricket Stadium, Guwahati
Umpires: Nikhil Menon and Anish Sahasrabudhe
Player of the match: Shahbaz Nadeem (Jharkhand)

- Jharkhand won the toss and elected to bat.
- Kumar Kushagra and Vikash Vishal (Jharkhand) both made their first-class debuts.

24–27 February 2022
Scorecard

Tamil Nadu	v	Chhattisgarh
470/9d (118 overs); Baba Aparajith 166 (267); Sumit Ruikar 4/68 (42 overs)		304 (133.3 overs); Harpreet Singh 170 (380); Ravisrinivasan Sai Kishore 4/68 (41 overs)
		172/8 (76 overs) (f/o); Shashank Singh 67 (124); Ravisrinivasan Sai Kishore 3/44 (26 overs)

Match drawn
Nehru Stadium, Guwahati
Umpires: Premdip Chatterjee and Ravi Shankar
Player of the match: Baba Aparajith (Tamil Nadu)

- Tamil Nadu won the toss and elected to bat.

=== Round 3 ===
3–6 March 2022
Scorecard

Chhattisgarh	v	Delhi
482/9d (145 overs); Amandeep Khare 156* (318); Vikas Mishra 6/124 (55 overs)		295 (95.3 overs); Nitish Rana 71 (152); Sumit Ruikar 3/45 (25 overs)
		396/2d (f/o) (89.3 overs); Yash Dhull 200* (261); Sumit Ruikar 1/56 (25 overs)

Match drawn
Barsapara Cricket Stadium, Guwahati
Umpires: Yeshwant Barde and Ghanasyam Prabhu
Player of the match: Amandeep Khare (Chhattisgarh)

- Chhattisgarh won the toss and elected to bat.
- Shubham Agarwal (Chhattisgarh) made his first-class debut.

3–6 March 2022
Scorecard

Tamil Nadu	v	Jharkhand
285 (80.2 overs); Baba Indrajith 100 (132); Sushant Mishra 3/32 (10.2 overs)		226 (74.3 overs); Saurabh Tiwary 58 (119); Manimaran Siddharth 4/37 (16.3 overs)
152 (54.2 overs); Baba Indrajith 52 (94); Rahul Shukla 5/29 (12.2 overs)		214/8 (80.4 overs); Saurabh Tiwary 93 (195); Baba Aparajith 2/27 (15 overs)

Jharkhand won by 2 wickets
Nehru Stadium, Guwahati
Umpires: Nikhil Menon and Anish Sahasrabudhe
Player of the match: Saurabh Tiwary (Jharkhand)

- Tamil Nadu won the toss and elected to bat.
