= 2016–17 Vijay Hazare Trophy Group B =

- Dates: 25 February 2017 – 6 March 2017
- Administrator: BCCI
- Cricket format: List A cricket
- Tournament format(s): Round-robin and Playoff format
- Host: Odisha
- Participants: 7
- Matches: 21
- Official website: Official website

2016–17 Vijay Hazare Trophy is the 15th season of the Vijay Hazare Trophy, a List A cricket tournament in India. It was contested by 28 domestic cricket teams of India.

== Points table ==
Pos	Team	Pld	W	L	T	NR	Pts	NRR	Qualification
1	Tamil Nadu	6	5	1	0	0	20	1.734	Knockout Stage
2	Maharashtra	6	5	1	0	0	20	1.214	Knockout Stage
3	Uttar Pradesh	6	3	3	0	0	12	0.515	
4	Delhi	6	3	3	0	0	12	−0.687	
5	Tripura	6	3	3	0	0	12	−0.811	
6	Himachal Pradesh	6	1	5	0	0	4	−0.385	
7	Kerala	6	1	5	0	0	4	−1.448	

== Fixtures ==
=== Round 1 ===
25 Feb 2017
09:00 IST
Scorecard

Delhi	v	Tamil Nadu

Tamil Nadu won by 42 runs

- Ganga Sridhar Raju and Kaushik Gandhi (Tamil Nadu) both made their List A debuts.

25 Feb 2017
09:00 IST
Scorecard

Himachal Pradesh	v	Maharashtra

Maharashtra won by 25 runs

- Ankit Kaushik (Himachal Pradesh); Jagdish Zope, Pradeep Dadhe and Ruturaj Gaikwad (Maharashtra) all made their List A debuts.

25 Feb 2017
09:00 IST
Scorecard

Kerala	v	Tripura

Tripura won by 2 wickets

- Krishna Kumar, Salman Nizar (Kerala); Dwaipayan Bhattacharjee, Bikramkumar Das, Bishal Ghosh, Abhijit Sarkar and Ajoy Sarkar (Tripura) all made their List A debuts.

=== Round 2 ===
26 February 2017
Scorecard

Delhi	v	Himachal Pradesh

Himachal Pradesh won by 185 runs

- Kulwant Khejroliya, Sarthak Ranjan (Delhi); Kanwar Abhinay and Dheeraj Kumar (Himachal Pradesh) all made their List A debuts.

26 February 2017
Scorecard

Kerala	v	Maharashtra

Maharashtra won by 122 runs

26 February 2017
Scorecard

Tamil Nadu	v	Uttar Pradesh

Tamil Nadu won by 7 wickets

- Narayan Jagadeesan (Tamil Nadu) made his List A debut.

=== Round 3 ===
28 February 2017
Scorecard

Delhi	v	Maharashtra

28 February 2017
Scorecard

Himachal Pradesh	v	Tamil Nadu

28 February 2017
Scorecard

Tripura	v	Uttar Pradesh

=== Round 4 ===
1 March 2017
Scorecard

Himachal Pradesh	v	Tripura

- Ravi Thakur (Himachal Pradesh) made his List A debut.

1 March 2017
Scorecard

Kerala	v	Uttar Pradesh

- Shivam Chaudhary (Uttar Pradesh) made his List A debut.

1 March 2017
Scorecard

Maharashtra	v	Tamil Nadu

=== Round 5 ===
3 March 2017
Scorecard

Delhi	v	Tripura

- Devnarayan Kumar (Tripura) made his List A debut.

3 March 2017
Scorecard

Kerala	v	Tamil Nadu

- Athif Bin Ashraf and Rohan Kunnummal (Kerala) both made their List A debuts.

3 March 2017
Scorecard

Maharashtra	v	Uttar Pradesh

=== Round 6 ===
4 March 2017
Scorecard

Delhi	v	Kerala

- Daryl Ferrario and Karaparambil Monish (Kerala) both made their List A debuts.

4 March 2017
Scorecard

Himachal Pradesh	v	Uttar Pradesh

- Ajay Rana, Ekant Sen (Himachal Pradesh) and Deependra Pandey (Uttar Pradesh) all made their List A debuts.

4 March 2017
Scorecard

Maharashtra	v	Tripura

- Satyajeet Bachhav (Maharashtra) and Mitan Debbarma (Tripura) both made their List A debuts.

=== Round 7 ===
6 March 2017
Scorecard

Delhi	v	Uttar Pradesh

6 March 2017
Scorecard

Himachal Pradesh	v	Kerala

- Shresth Nirmohi (Himachal Pradesh) made his List A debut.

6 March 2017
Scorecard

Tamil Nadu	v	Tripura

- Ramalingam Rohit (Tamil Nadu) and Joydeep Banik (Tripura) both made their List A debuts.
