= List of Haryana cricketers =

This is a list of cricketers who have played first-class, List A or Twenty20 cricket for Indian state of Haryana.

== Male cricketers ==
Male cricketers who have played for the Haryana cricket team.

- Vivek Agarwal (3/1/1962 – 26/4/1993)
- Rajinder Amarnath (30/6/1956 – )
- Desh Azad (2/2/1938 – 16/8/2013)
- Hemang Badani (14/11/1976 – )
- Avi Barot (25/6/1992 – )
- Chaitanya Bishnoi (25/8/1994 – )
- Manvinder Bisla (27/12/1984 – )
- Sanjay Budhwar (8/10/1987 – )
- Ravinder Chadha (16/3/1951 – )
- Ajit Chahal (12/12/1995 – )
- Yuzvendra Chahal (23/7/1990 – )
- Ajit Chandila (5/12/1983 – )
- Shivam Chauhan (14/10/1997 – )
- Mukul Dagar (17/12/1990 – )
- Rahul Dagar (4/7/1993 – )
- Virender Dahiya (7/2/1989 – )
- Rahul Dalal (2/2/1992 – )
- Kapil Dev (6/1/1959 – )
- Rahul Dewan (15/7/1986 – )
- Rahul Vashisth(28/03/1989-)
- Feroze Ghayas (3/5/1973 – )
- Rajinder Goel (20/9/1942 – )
- Ranjan Gupta (11/12/1980 – )
- Ashish Hooda (20/9/1989 – )
- Kuldeep Hooda (15/11/1989 – )
- Mohit Hooda (19/8/1998 – )
- Ajay Jadeja (1/2/1971 – )
- Pradeep Jain (22/5/1965 – )
- Vineet Jain (16/5/1972 – )
- Sandeep Joshi (2/9/1967 – )
- Saad Bin Jung (26/10/1960 – )
- Amarjit Kaypee (2/10/1960 – )
- Ashok Malhotra ( – )
- Poonish Mehta (4/11/1993 – )
- Amit Mishra (24/11/1982 – )
- Sumit Narwal (1982 – )
- Narender Negi (12/2/1978 – )
- Pratyaksh Singh (22/03/2018 – )
- Rajinder Pal (18/11/1937 – )
- Harshal Patel (23/11/1990 – )
- Amit Rana (14/12/1995 – )
- Himanshu Rana (1/10/1998 – )
- Sachin Rana
- Ajay Ratra (13/12/1981 – )
- Mahesh Rawat (25/10/1985 – )
- Shubham Rohilla (10/3/1998 – )
- Pardeep Sahu (21/8/1985 – )
- Nitin Saini (28/10/1988 – )
- Ashok Sandhu (11/10/2000 – )
- Sanjay Pahal (07/02/2018 – )
- Chetan Sharma (3/1/1966 – )
- Deepak Sharma (11/2/1960 – )
- Joginder Sharma (23/10/1983 – )
- Joginder Singh Rao
- Mohit Sharma (18/9/1988 – )
- Rohit Sharma (28/6/1993 – )
- Narinder Singh (4/7/1954 – )
- Sandeep Singh (10/10/1988 – 6/2/2014)
- Sunny Singh (18/12/1986 – )
- Yograj Singh (25/3/1958 – )
- Arun Singla (8/6/1970 – )
- Vidyut Sivaramakrishnan (3/12/1981 – )
- Sarkar Talwar (22/9/1952 – )
- Priyank Tehlan (11/9/1988 – )
- Rahul Tewatia (20/5/1993 – )
- Siddharth Verma (20/11/1980 – )
- Kanwar Virdi (11/2/1969 – )
- Jayant Yadav (22/1/1990 – )
- Shamsher Yadav (12/12/1994 – )
- Vijay Yadav (14/3/1967 – )
- Dhanraj Singh (cricketer) (01/06/1968 – )
- Anshul Kamboj (2022 – present)

== Female cricketers ==
Female cricketers who have played for the Haryana women's cricket team.

- Preeti Bose (20/4/1992 – )
- Mansi Joshi (6/11/1991 – )
