= Dheeraj Kumar (disambiguation) =

Dheeraj Kumar can refer to:

- Dheeraj Kumar (1944-2025), Indian actor
- Dheeraj Kumar (Punjabi actor)
- Dheeraj Kumar (cricketer, born 1994), Indian cricketer
- Dheeraj Kumar (cricketer, born 1999), Indian cricketer
