= Kant Singh =

Indian cricketer (born 1989)

Abhuday Kant Singh
Personal information
- Full name: Abhuday Kant Singh
- Born: 30 September 1989 (age 37); Bilaspur, Chhattisgarh, India
- Source: ESPNcricinfo, 6 October 2016

Abhuday Kant Singh (born 30 September 1989) is an Indian cricketer. He made his first-class debut for Chhattisgarh in the 2016–17 Ranji Trophy on 6 October 2016. He made his Twenty20 debut for Chhattisgarh in the 2016–17 Inter State Twenty-20 Tournament on 30 January 2017. He made his List A debut for Chhattisgarh in the 2016–17 Vijay Hazare Trophy on 25 February 2017.
