= Ravi Thakur =

Ravi Thakur may refer to:

- Ravi Thakur (cricketer)
- Ravi Thakur (politician)
