= Ashutosh Singh =

Ashutosh Singh may refer to:

- Ashutosh Singh (cricketer) (born 1994), Indian domestic cricketer
- Ashutosh Singh (tennis) (born 1982), Indian professional tennis player
