= Mahind Naik =

Indian cricketer

Career statistics
Competition	First-class	List A
Matches	1	1
Runs scored	14	26
Batting average	–	26.00
100s/50s	0/0	0/0
Top score	14*	26
Catches/stumpings	0/–	0/–
- Source: ESPNcricinfo, 29 May 2020

Mahind Naik was a first class cricketer from India, who played for Goa. He played his only first class match in 1999–2000 season and played his only List-A match in 2000–01 season.

== See also ==
List of Goa cricketers
