= Samiullah Beigh =

Indian cricketer (born 1981)

Personal information
- Born: 15 April 1981 (age 45); Srinagar, India
- Source: Cricinfo, 23 October 2015

Samiullah Beigh (born 15 April 1981) is a former Indian first-class cricketer who played for Jammu and Kashmir from 2002 to 2017.

A right-handed batsman and right-arm fast-medium bowler, he scored his maiden first-class century in October 2016 in the 2016–17 Ranji Trophy. His best first-class bowling figures were 6 for 42 in the victory over Assam in 2013–14.

He has a bachelor's degree in civil engineering and a master's degree in structural engineering. He works as an assistant executive engineer in Jammu and Kashmir's Public Health Engineering department, with responsibility for the installation of pipe networks and water filtration plants.
