= Athif Bin Ashraf =

Indian cricketer (born 1997)

Personal information
- Born: 2 January 1997 (age 29); Thrissur, India
- Batting: Right-handed
- Bowling: Right-arm medium-fast
- Role: Bowler
- Source: ESPNcricinfo, 8 December 2016

Athif Bin Ashraf (born 2 January 1997) is an Indian first-class cricketer who plays for Kerala. He made his first-class debut for Kerala in the 2016-17 Ranji Trophy on 7 December 2016. He made his List A debut for Kerala in the 2016–17 Vijay Hazare Trophy on 3 March 2017.
