= Aniruddha Saha =

Indian cricketer (born 1992)

Personal information
- Full name: Aniruddha Pradip Saha
- Born: 8 November 1990; Agartala, Tripura India
- Batting: Right-handed

Domestic team information
- Years: Team
- 2016-17: Tripura
- Source: ESPNcricinfo, 29 November 2016

Aniruddha Saha (born 5 April 1992) is an Indian first-class cricketer who plays for Tripura. He made his first-class debut for Tripura in the 2016-17 Ranji Trophy on 29 November 2016.
