= Rajat Dey =

Indian cricketer (born 1996)

Personal information
- Full name: Rajat Arjun Dey
- Born: 31 December 1996 (age 29)
- Source: Cricinfo, 10 January 2016

Rajat Dey (born 31 December 1996) is an Indian cricketer who plays for Tripura. He made his Twenty20 debut on 2 January 2016 in the 2015–16 Syed Mushtaq Ali Trophy. He made his first-class debut for Tripura in the 2016–17 Ranji Trophy on 6 October 2016. He made his List A debut for Tripura in the 2017–18 Vijay Hazare Trophy on 5 February 2018.
