= Sahil Gupta =

Indian cricketer (born 1992)

Personal information
- Born: 12 April 1992 (age 34); Panna, Madhya Pradesh, India
- Source: ESPNcricinfo, 6 October 2016

Sahil Gupta (born 12 April 1992) is an Indian cricketer. He made his first-class debut for Chhattisgarh in the 2016–17 Ranji Trophy on 6 October 2016. He made his Twenty20 debut for Chhattisgarh in the 2016–17 Inter State Twenty-20 Tournament on 29 January 2017. He made his List A debut for Chhattisgarh in the 2016–17 Vijay Hazare Trophy on 25 February 2017.
