= Mudi Prajith =

Indian cricketer (born 1989)

Personal information
- Born: 27 August 1989 (age 37); Nellore
- Batting: Right-handed
- Role: Wicketkeeper
- Source: ESPNcricinfo, 7 December 2016

Mudi Prajith (born 27 August 1989) is an Indian first-class cricketer who plays for Andhra. He made his first-class debut for Andhra in the 2016-17 Ranji Trophy on 7 December 2016.
