= Raj Bahadur (cricketer) =

Indian cricketer (born 1993)

Personal information
- Born: 5 October 1993 (age 33); Allahabad, India
- Batting: Left-handed
- Bowling: Left-arm medium

Domestic team information
- Years: Team
- 2016/17: Services
- Source: ESPNcricinfo, 13 October 2016

Raj Bahadur (born 5 October 1993) is an Indian cricketer. He made his first-class debut for Services in the 2016–17 Ranji Trophy on 13 October 2016.
