= Suhail Andleev =

Indian cricketer (born 1982)

Personal information
- Born: 8 November 1982; Srinagar, India
- Batting: Right-handed
- Source: ESPNcricinfo, 29 November 2016

Suhail Andleev (born 8 November 1982) is an Indian first-class cricketer who plays for Jammu and Kashmir. He made his first-class debut for Jammu and Kashmir in the 2016-17 Ranji Trophy on 29 November 2016.
