= Mohsin Mufti =

Indian cricketer (born 1990)

Personal information
- Full name: Mohsin Mufti Hussain
- Born: 31 December 1990 (age 35); Anantnag, India
- Batting: Right-handed
- Source: ESPNcricinfo, 8 December 2016

Mohsin Mufti (born 31 December 1990) is an Indian first-class cricketer who plays for Jammu and Kashmir. He made his first-class debut for Jammu and Kashmir in the 2016-17 Ranji Trophy on 7 December 2016.
