= Krishna Kumar (cricketer) =

Indian cricketer (born 1991)

Personal information
- Born: 10 December 1991 (age 34)
- Source: ESPNcricinfo, 25 February 2017

Krishna Kumar (born 10 December 1991) is an Indian cricketer. He made his List A debut for Kerala in the 2016–17 Vijay Hazare Trophy on 25 February 2017.
