= Vinod Kumar (cricketer) =

Indian cricketer (born 1987)

Personal information
- Full name: Venugopalan Vinod Kumar
- Born: 31 July 1987 (age 39); Thrissur, India
- Batting: Right-handed
- Bowling: Right-arm medium

Domestic team information
- Years: Team
- 2010–: Kerala

Career statistics
| Competition | FC | LA | T20 |
|---|---|---|---|
| Matches | 5 | 10 | 26 |
| Runs scored | 81 | 67 | 98 |
| Batting average | 13.50 | 11.16 | 19.60 |
| 100s/50s | 0/0 | 0/0 | 0/0 |
| Top score | 21 | 22* | 45 |
| Balls bowled | 805 | 489 | 514 |
| Wickets | 13 | 10 | 25 |
| Bowling average | 26.00 | 49.50 | 26.44 |
| 5 wickets in innings | 0 | 0 | 0 |
| 10 wickets in match | 0 | 0 | 0 |
| Best bowling | 4/68 | 2/34 | 4/22 |
| Catches/stumpings | 1/– | 3/– | 4/– |
- Source: ESPNcricinfo, 20 March 2025

Vinod Kumar (born 31 July 1987) is an Indian cricketer. He made his first-class debut for Kerala in the 2016–17 Ranji Trophy on 5 November 2016.
