= Rahul Singh Gahlaut =

Indian cricketer (born 1995)

Gahlaut Rahul Singh
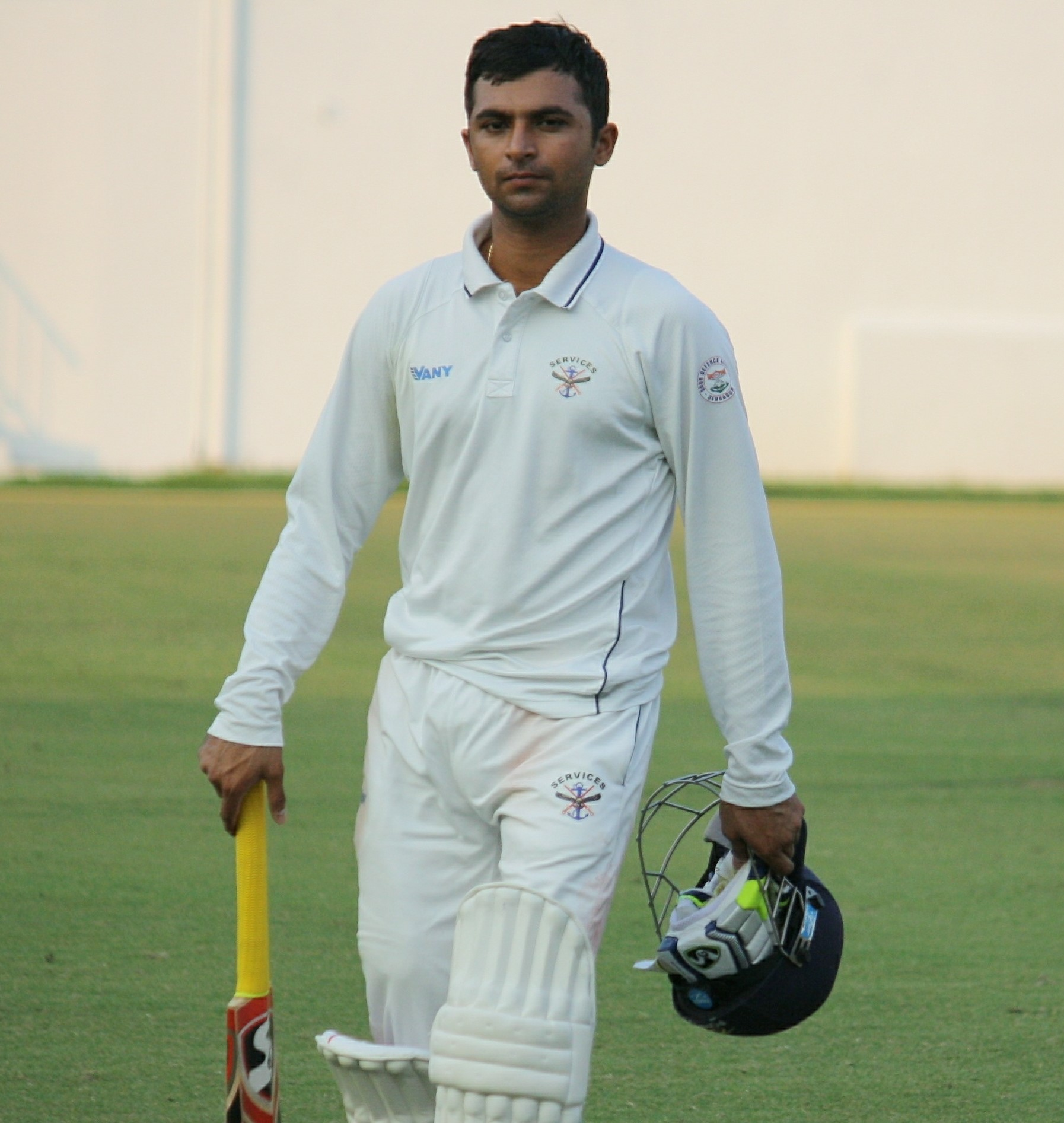

Personal information
- Born: 18 September 1995 (age 31); Maniktala, West Bengal, India
- Batting: Left-handed
- Bowling: Right-arm medium

Domestic team information
- Years: Team
- 2007–15: Hyderabad
- 2016–present: Services

Career statistics
Competition	FC	LA	T20
Matches	35	35	31
Runs scored	2413	1145	568
Batting average	43.08	38.16	22.72
100s/50s	7/12	2/7	0/3
Top score	182	124*	76*
Catches/stumpings	19/0	7/0	16/0
- Source: ESPNcricinfo, 31 January 2021

Rahul Singh Gahlaut (born 18 September 1995) is an Indian cricketer who plays for Services. He made his List A and debut for Hyderabad in the 2012–13 Vijay Hazare Trophy (14 February 2013) and the 2012–13 Inter State Twenty-20 Tournament (22 March 2013), respectively. He made his first-class debut on 6 October 2016 for Services in the 2016–17 Ranji Trophy.
