= Parivesh Dhar =

Indian cricketer (born 2000)

Personal information
- Born: 16 March 2000 (age 26)
- Source: Cricinfo, 16 January 2021

Parivesh Dhar (born 16 March 2000) is an Indian cricketer. He made his Twenty20 debut on 16 January 2021, for Chhattisgarh in the 2020–21 Syed Mushtaq Ali Trophy.
