= Vikalp Tiwari =

Indian cricketer (born 2009)

Personal information
- Born: 24 September 2009 (age 17); Rajnandgaon, Chhattisgarh, India
- Batting: Left-handed
- Bowling: Slow Left-Arm Orthodox
- Role: Top-order batter

Domestic team information
- Years: Team
- 2026–present: Chhattisgarh

Career statistics
Competition	FC	LA	T20
Matches	6	6	3
Runs scored	302	193	169
Batting average	30.20	38.60	84.50
100s/50s	/2	1/	1/1
Top score	94	112*	119*
Catches/stumpings	2/	1/	3/-
- Source: cricinfo, 18 November 2026

Vikalp tiwari (born 24 September 2009) is an Indian cricketer, who plays as a middle order batter. He plays for Chhattisgarh in domestic cricket team.

== Career ==
Tiwari made his List A debut on 24 December 2025 in the 2025-26 Vijay Hazare Trophy. First-class debut followed on 22 January 2026 against Delhi in the 2025-26 Ranji Trophy During the 2026–27 Ranji Trophy,he scored a half-century against Hyderabad to help stabilize Chhattisgarh's innings. In November 2026, he made his Twenty20 debut as the captain of Chhattisgarh in the 2026–27 Syed Mushtaq Ali Trophy, scoring 50 runs off 17 balls against Uttarakhand. On 18 November 2026, he scored his maiden Twenty20 century, hitting 119 runs off 56 balls against Odisha in the 2026–27 Syed Mushtaq Ali Trophy.
