= Daryl Ferrario =

Indian cricketer (born 1998)

Personal information
- Full name: Daryl Sundar Ferrario
- Born: 7 May 1998 (age 28); Malappuram, Kerala, India
- Batting: Right handed
- Bowling: Right arm off-break
- Role: Batting all-rounder

Domestic team information
- Years: Team
- 2017-present: Kerala

Career statistics
Competition	LA	T20
Matches	8	5
Runs scored	80	51
Batting average	13.33	12.75
100s/50s	0/0	0/0
Top score	33	22
Balls bowled	18	—
Wickets	0	—
Bowling average	—	—
5 wickets in innings	–	–
10 wickets in match	–	–
Best bowling	–	–
Catches/stumpings	5/0	3/0
- Source: ESPNcricinfo, 31 January 2022

Daryl Sundar Ferrario (born 7 May 1998) is an Indian cricketer who plays for Kerala in domestic cricket. He is an all-rounder who bats right-handed and bowls right-arm offbreak.

== Early life ==
Daryl was born 7 May 1998 on Malappuram in Kerala where his mother, Amala then worked as a doctor. He was named after the South African cricketer Daryll Cullinan, who was his mother's favourite cricketer and the Ferrari car, which his father was fond of.

His father, Sunder Singh introduced him to cricket. Aged barely six, Daryl started to represent local cricket sides in the U-10 category in Chennai. He started his cricket training at J.S. Rao Academy from Grade II and later at CSSF. He grew up in Chennai where he was educated till Grade X in Don Bosco, Egmore. He then took a break from studies for two years to concentrate in cricket.

In 2014, his parents moved to Kerala where he continued his cricketing career.

== Career ==
Daryl has represented Tamil Nadu in age-limit levels. He led the Tamil Nadu U-16 team in the Vijay Merchant South Zone championship in 2013. In 2014, he switched bases from Tamil Nadu to Kerala where he continued to play junior cricket.

In 2016, he scored 125 runs in the Vinoo Mankad Trophy Inter-State tournament including an unbeaten hundred against Goa. In the same year, he played for India Blue in U-19 Challenger Trophy. Following his performances in these tours, he was selected to play for the India U-19 for the Youth Asia Cup held on Sri Lanka in December 2016. Though, he was later found ineligible to play as he doesn't meet the criteria for selection.

He was part of the Indian U-19 side to play the Youth Test series against England U-19 held in February 2017. He hit a century against England U-19 on the first Youth test match on Nagpur. He also played a decent innings of 37 runs in the second inning saving his team from a defeat. He scored a half-century on the first innings of the second test match and took four wickets from both innings'.

He made his List A debut for Kerala on 4 March 2017 in the 2016–17 Vijay Hazare Trophy against Delhi. He made his T20 debut for Kerala on 12 January 2018 in the 2018-19 Syed Mushtaq Ali Trophy against Goa.

He captained Salem Spartans in the 2021 Tamil Nadu Premier League.
