= Abhishek Singh (cricketer) =

Indian cricketer (born 1984)

Personal information
- Born: 12 November 1984 (age 42); Bilaspur, India
- Source: ESPNcricinfo, 6 November 2016

Abhishek Singh (born 12 November 1984) is an Indian cricketer. He made his first-class debut for Chhattisgarh in the 2016–17 Ranji Trophy on 5 November 2016.
