= Vivek Naidu =

Indian cricketer (born 1979)

Personal information
- Full name: Vivek Chandrasekhar Naidu
- Born: 8 July 1979 (age 47); Nagpur, India
- Source: ESPNcricinfo, 22 November 2016

Vivek Naidu (born 8 July 1979) is an Indian first-class cricketer who plays for Chhattisgarh. He made his first-class debut in 1999.
