= Devnarayan Kumar =

Indian cricketer (born 1996)

Personal information
- Born: 25 December 1996 (age 29); West Chakakbai, South Tripura, Tripura
- Source: ESPNcricinfo, 3 March 2017

Devnarayan Kumar (born 25 December 1996) is an Indian cricketer. He made his List A debut for Tripura in the 2016–17 Vijay Hazare Trophy on 3 March 2017.
