= Sumiran Amonkar =

Indian cricketer (born 1991)

Personal information
- Full name: Sumiran Praneet Amonkar
- Born: 28 July 1991 (age 35); Margao, Goa, India
- Batting: Right-handed
- Bowling: Right-arm medium

Domestic team information
- Years: Team
- 2016/17: Goa
- Source: ESPNcricinfo, 22 October 2016

Sumiran Amonkar (born 28 July 1991) is an Indian cricketer. He made his first-class debut for Goa in the 2016–17 Ranji Trophy on 20 October 2016. On his debut, he scored a century. He made his List A debut for Goa in the 2016–17 Vijay Hazare Trophy on 25 February 2017.
