= Nikhil Doru =

Indian cricketer (born 1979)

Personal information
- Full name: Nikhil Sanat Doru
- Born: 23 January 1979 (age 47); Udaipur, India
- Batting: Right-handed
- Role: Wicket-keeper

Domestic team information
- Years: Team
- 1999-2009: Rajasthan
- 2016: Railways
- Source: ESPNcricinfo, 16 November 2016

Nikhil Doru (born 23 January 1979) is an Indian first-class cricketer who plays for Railways. He made his first-class debut for Rajasthan in the 1999–00 Ranji Trophy on 11 November 1999.
