= Kuldeep Hooda =

Indian cricketer (born 1989)

Personal information
- Full name: Kuldeep Randhir Hooda
- Born: 15 November 1989 (age 36); Rohtak, Haryana, India
- Source: ESPNcricinfo, 22 November 2016

Kuldeep Hooda (born 15 November 1989) is an Indian first-class cricketer who plays for Haryana. He made his first-class debut for Haryana in the 2012–13 Ranji Trophy on 2 November 2012.
