= Rana Kalangutkar =

Indian cricketer (born 1982)

Personal information
- Full name: Rana Dashrath Kalangutkar
- Born: 19 October 1982; Mapusa, Goa, India
- Batting: Right-handed
- Role: Batsman

Domestic team information
- Years: Team
- 2007: Goa

Career statistics
Competition	FC
Matches	2
Runs scored	5
Batting average	n/a
100s/50s	0/0
Top score	5*
Catches/stumpings	0/-
- Source: CricketArchive, 21 June 2013

Rana Dashrath Kalangutkar (born 19 October 1982) is an Indian cricketer who played two Twenty20 matches for Goa during the 2006–07 season.

Kalangutkar was born in Mapusa in the North Goa district, and played representative matches for Goa in regional tournaments at under-16, under-22, and under-25 level. A batsman, his two matches for the Goa senior team came during the 2006–07 season of the Inter-State T20 Championship. On debut against Karnataka in April 2007, Kalangutkar scored five runs not out batting last in Goa's first innings, but did not bat in his second and final match, played against Kerala the following day.

As of January 2015, ESPNcricinfo, a cricket website, incorrectly gives Kalangutkar's date of birth as 19 October 1992, and lists him as the second-youngest player to have played at Twenty20 level (behind Shah Mureed, whose birthdate is also given incorrectly). This record is in fact held by Pakistani cricketer Nasir Jamshed, who made his Twenty20 debut for the Lahore Lions in April 2005, at the age of 15 years and 140 days.
