= Amandeep Khare =

Indian cricketer (born 1997)

Personal information
- Full name: Amandeep Narayan Khare
- Born: 5 August 1997 (age 29); Bhilai, Chhattisgarh, India
- Batting: Right-handed
- Bowling: Right-arm medium
- Role: Batsman

Domestic team information
- Years: Team
- 2016–present: Chhattisgarh

Career statistics
Competition	FC	LA	T20
Matches	65	69	60
Runs scored	4500	2649	1760
Batting average	51.13	48.16	37.44
100s/50s	17/14	5/19	0/11
Top score	210	121	90
Balls bowled	1085	366	12
Wickets	3	5	0
Bowling average	–	33.60	–
5 wickets in innings	0	0	0
10 wickets in match	0	0	0
Best bowling	–	1/5	–
Catches/stumpings	31/–	18/–	21/–
- Source: , 22 October 2026

Amandeep Narayan Khare (born 5 August 1997) is an Indian cricketer who plays for the Chhattisgarh cricket team. He is a right-handed batsman and a right-arm medium bowler.

In December 2015, he scored a century for India national under-19 cricket team against Sri Lanka national under-19 cricket team and help his team to win a four-run D/L win over Sri Lanka Under-19s at the Premadasa Stadium. He is the first player from Chhattisgarh cricket Team Who selected for Under-19 Cricket World Cup. He made his first-class debut for Chhattisgarh in the 2016–17 Ranji Trophy on 6 October 2016. He scored a century in his second match against Andhra Pradesh to help Chhattisgarh recover in their first innings. He made his Twenty20 debut for Chhattisgarh in the 2016–17 Inter State Twenty-20 Tournament on 29 January 2017. He made his List A debut for Chhattisgarh in the 2016–17 Vijay Hazare Trophy on 25 February 2017.

In October 2019, he was named in India A's squad for the 2019–20 Deodhar Trophy.

== Early life and education ==
Amandeep Narayan Khare was born on 5 August 1997 in Durg, Chhattisgarh, India. He grew up in Bhilai, where his father worked as a chargeman in the wire-rod division of the Bhilai Steel Plant.

Khare attended BSP Senior Secondary School, Sector 10, Bhilai. During his school years, he pursued cricket alongside his studies and represented his school in cricket competitions. In 2016, he was studying science with mathematics in Class 12 while continuing his cricket career.
