= Mani Sharma (cricketer) =

Indian cricketer (born 1996)

Personal information
- Born: 30 October 1996 (age 30)
- Source: ESPNcricinfo, 18 January 2021

Mani Sharma (born 30 October 1996) is an Indian cricketer. He made his Twenty20 debut on 18 January 2021, for Himachal Pradesh in the 2020–21 Syed Mushtaq Ali Trophy.
