= DC Rajesh =

Indian cricketer

DC Rajesh (born 28 March 1975) is an Indian cricketer. He was a right-handed batsman and a right-arm medium-fast bowler who played for Goa. He was born in Bangalore.

Rajesh's first cricketing appearances came for the Karnataka Under-19s team, during the 1992–93 Cooch Behar Trophy, though he played no further competitive cricket until 1999. Rajesh played in the Gold Cup tournament between the 1999–2000 and 2001–02 seasons.

Rajesh made two first-class appearances, during the 2003–04 season, his debut coming against Orissa. Playing as a tailender, he scored a total of 15 runs in his two debut innings, but in his second, and final, match, scored a duck in his first innings and four runs in his second.
