= Shahbaz Hussain =

Indian cricketer (born 1996)

Personal information
- Full name: Mohammad Shahbaz Hussain
- Born: 9 December 1996 (age 29); Bilaspur, Chhattisgarh, India
- Source: Cricinfo, 10 January 2021

Shahbaz Hussain (born 9 December 1996) is an Indian cricketer. He made his Twenty20 debut on 10 January 2021, representing Chhattisgarh in the 2020–21 Syed Mushtaq Ali Trophy. He made his first-class debut on 17 February 2022, also for Chhattisgarh, in the 2021–22 Ranji Trophy.
