= Rishabh Tiwari =

Indian cricketer (born 1993)

Personal information
- Born: 1 September 1993 (age 33); Jabalpur, Madhya Pradesh, India
- Batting: Left-handed
- Bowling: Legbreak googly

Domestic team information
- Years: Team
- 2016–17: Chhattisgarh
- Source: ESPNcricinfo, 6 October 2016

Rishabh Tiwari (born 1 September 1993) is an Indian cricketer. He made his first-class debut for Chhattisgarh in the 2016–17 Ranji Trophy on 6 October 2016. He made his Twenty20 debut for Chhattisgarh in the 2017–18 Zonal T20 League on 10 January 2018. He made his List A debut for Chhattisgarh in the 2018–19 Vijay Hazare Trophy on 30 September 2018.
