= Guntashveer Singh =

Indian cricketer (born 1993)

Personal information
- Full name: Guntashveer Amarjeet Singh
- Born: 14 October 1993 (age 33); Chandigarh, India
- Batting: Right-handed
- Bowling: Right-arm off-break
- Role: Batsman

Domestic team information
- Years: Team
- 2016: Haryana
- Source: ESPNcricinfo

Guntashveer Amarjeet Singh (born 14 October 1993) is an Indian cricketer from Chandigarh. He is a right-handed batsman and bowls right-arm off break.

== List-A career ==
As of September 2016, he represents Haryana in the First-class and List-A cricket.
