= Dheeraj Kumar (Andhra Pradesh cricketer) =

Indian cricketer (born 1999)

Personal information
- Born: 4 September 1999 (age 27); Anakapalli
- Source: ESPNcricinfo, 13 January 2021

Dheeraj Kumar (born 4 September 1999) is an Indian cricketer. He made his Twenty20 debut on 13 January 2021, for Andhra in the 2020–21 Syed Mushtaq Ali Trophy.
