= Anshul Gupta =

Indian cricketer (born 1989)

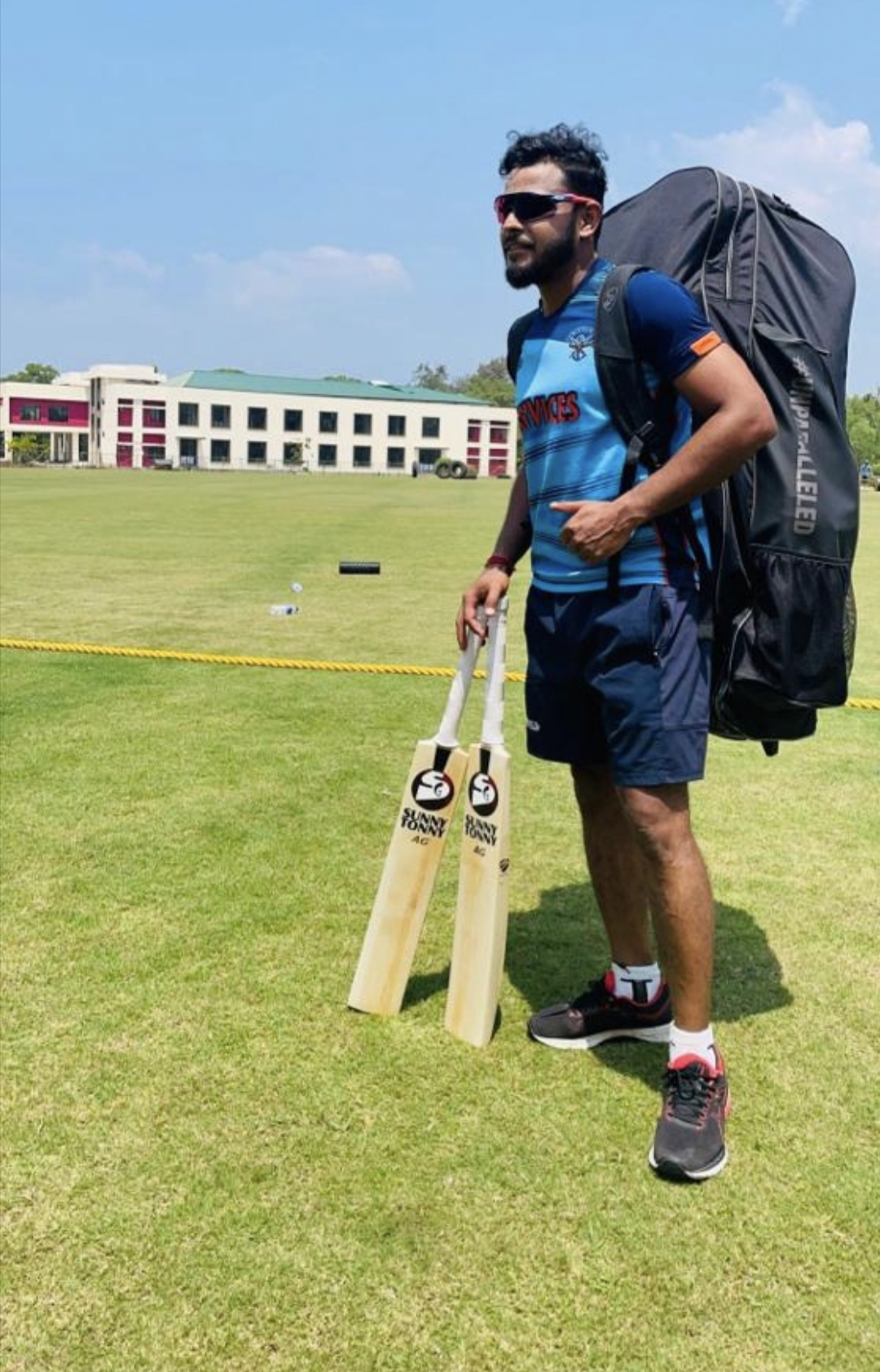

Personal information
- Full name: Anshul Harish Gupta
- Born: 20 September 1989 (age 37); Ghaziabad, Uttar Pradesh, India
- Batting: Right-handed
- Bowling: Right-arm off spin

Domestic team information
- Years: Team
- 2004–2010: Delhi
- 2011- present: Services

Career statistics
Competition	FC	LA	T20
Matches	45	10	33
Runs scored	2,246	174	549
Batting average	30.76	24.85	18.93
100s/50s	3/15	0/0	0/0
Top score	147	47	52*
Catches/stumpings	21/0	4/0	9/0
- Source: ESPNcricinfo, 2 March 2022

Anshul Gupta (born 20 September 1989) is an Indian first-class cricketer who plays for Services. He made his List A debut for Services in the 2012–13 Vijay Hazare Trophy on 13 February 2013. He made his Twenty20 debut for Services in the 2010–11 Inter State Twenty-20 Tournament on 22 October 2011. He made his first-class debut on 2 November 2012 for Services in the 2012–13 Ranji Trophy.
