= Aditya Singh =

Indian cricketer (born 1989)

Personal information
- Full name: Aditya Pratap Singh
- Born: 12 December 1989 (age 36); Jammu, India
- Source: ESPNcricinfo, 22 November 2016

Aditya Singh (born 12 December 1989) is an Indian cricketer. He made his first-class debut for Jammu & Kashmir in the 2008–09 Ranji Trophy on 3 November 2008.
