= Srinivas Fadte =

Indian cricketer (born 1993)

Personal information
- Full name: Srinivas Gurunath Fadte
- Born: 10 October 1993 (age 33); Ponda, Goa, India
- Batting: Right handed
- Bowling: Right arm medium

Domestic team information
- Years: Team
- 2016–17: Goa
- Source: ESPNcricinfo, 7 December 2016

Srinivas Fadte (born 10 October 1993) is an Indian cricketer. He made his first-class debut for Goa in the 2016–17 Ranji Trophy on 7 December 2016. He made his List A debut for Goa in the 2017–18 Vijay Hazare Trophy on 6 February 2018.
