= Nilesh Prabhudesai =

Indian cricketer (born 1967)

Personal information
- Full name: Nilesh Keshav Prabhudesai
- Born: 13 May 1967 (age 59); Margao, Goa, India
- Batting: Right-handed
- Bowling: Right-arm medium
- Role: All-rounder

Domestic team information
- Years: Team
- 1988/89: Goa
- Source: ESPNcricinfo, 11 March 2016

Nilesh Keshav Prabhudesai (born 13 May 1967 in Margao, Goa) is an Indian first-class cricketer who played for Goa.
