= Sandeep Joshi (Haryana cricketer) =

Indian cricketer (born 1967)

Sandeep Joshi (born 2 September 1967) was an Indian cricketer who played for Haryana. He was born in Kanpur. He was a right-arm leg-break/googly bowler who played for Haryana from 1990-91 and Assam from 1998–99. Sandeep Joshi made three first-class appearances for Haryana in the 1990-91 Ranji Trophy season between November and December. Joshi batted in a single first-class innings, scoring 5 not out, and bowled 56 overs, taking innings-best figures of 5-86. Sandeep Joshi, made a single appearance in the English First Class Second XI Cricket Championship for Middlesex Second XI in 1990 against Leicester at Market Harboura and took five wickets and scored 26 runs. Sandeep Joshi also represented Assam Ranji Trophy cricket team in 1998–99 season against Orissa. He made a single first-class appearance for Assam in the 1998–99 season, against Orissa and took three wickets and scored 8 and 0 runs respectively. He works for Air India in the Sports Division in Delhi, and is also a regular newspaper columnist syndicated to various regional and national dailies.
