= Ranjeet Nikam =

Indian cricketer (born 1999)

Personal information
- Full name: Ranjeet Ramesh Nikam
- Born: 20 September 1999 (age 27); Kolhapur, Maharashtra, India
- Batting: Right handed
- Bowling: Right arm offbreak
- Role: Batter

Domestic team information
- Years: Team
- 2021–present: Maharashtra
- Source: Cricinfo, 16 January 2021

Ranjeet Nikam (born 20 September 1999) is an Indian cricketer who represents Maharashtra in domestic cricket.

He made his Twenty20 debut on 16 January 2021, for Maharashtra in the 2020–21 Syed Mushtaq Ali Trophy. He made his List A debut on 25 February 2021, for Maharashtra in the 2020–21 Vijay Hazare Trophy.
