= Mohammed Azharuddeen =

Indian cricketer

Personal information
- Born: 22 March 1994 (age 32); Thalangara, Kerala, India
- Batting: Right-handed
- Bowling: Right-arm (unknown style)
- Role: Wicket-keeper-batter

Domestic team information
- Years: Team
- 2015–present: Kerala (squad no. 14)

Career statistics
Competition	FC	LA	T20
Matches	35	48	48
Runs scored	1,800	1,034	829
Batting average	36.00	25.85	20.21
100s/50s	2/11	1/7	1/2
Top score	177*	104	137*
Catches/stumpings	89/15	39/6	28/1
- Source: ESPNcricinfo, 9 April 2025

Mohammed Azharuddeen (born 22 March 1994) is an Indian cricketer who plays for Kerala in domestic cricket. He is a right-handed wicket-keeper-batter.

== Early life ==
Azharuddeen was born on 22 March 1994 in Thalangara in Kasaragod district of Kerala to BK Moidu and Nabeesa. He was the youngest of eight brothers. He was named after the former Indian captain Mohammad Azharuddin by his elder brother. Following the footsteps of his brothers who have all played district level cricket, Azharuddeen started playing cricket when he was 9. He lost his mother when he was 16 and his father when he was 20.

== Domestic career ==
Azharuddeen made his first-class debut on 15 November 2015 in the 2015–16 Ranji Trophy. He made his List A debut on 10 December 2015 in the 2015–16 Vijay Hazare Trophy. He made his Twenty20 debut on 2 January 2016 in the 2015–16 Syed Mushtaq Ali Trophy.

In August 2018, he was one of five players that were suspended for three games in the 2018–19 Vijay Hazare Trophy, after showing dissent against Kerala's captain, Sachin Baby.

On 13 January 2021, in the 2020–21 Syed Mushtaq Ali Trophy, Azharuddeen became the first T20 centurion for Kerala as he hammered a 37-ball ton against Mumbai. It was also the second-fastest century in the Syed Mushtaq Ali Trophy and joint third-fastest by an Indian batsman. His final score of 137 off 54 deliveries was also the third-highest score in the tournament.

On 18 Feb 2025, Azharuddeen became the first Kerala player to score a century in a Ranji Trophy SemiFinal vs Gujarat.

== Indian Premier League ==
In February 2021, Azharuddeen was bought by the Royal Challengers Bangalore in the IPL auction ahead of the 2021 Indian Premier League. However, he went unsold in the 2022 auction.
