= Pankaj Kumar Rao =

Indian cricketer (born 1989)

Pankaj Rao
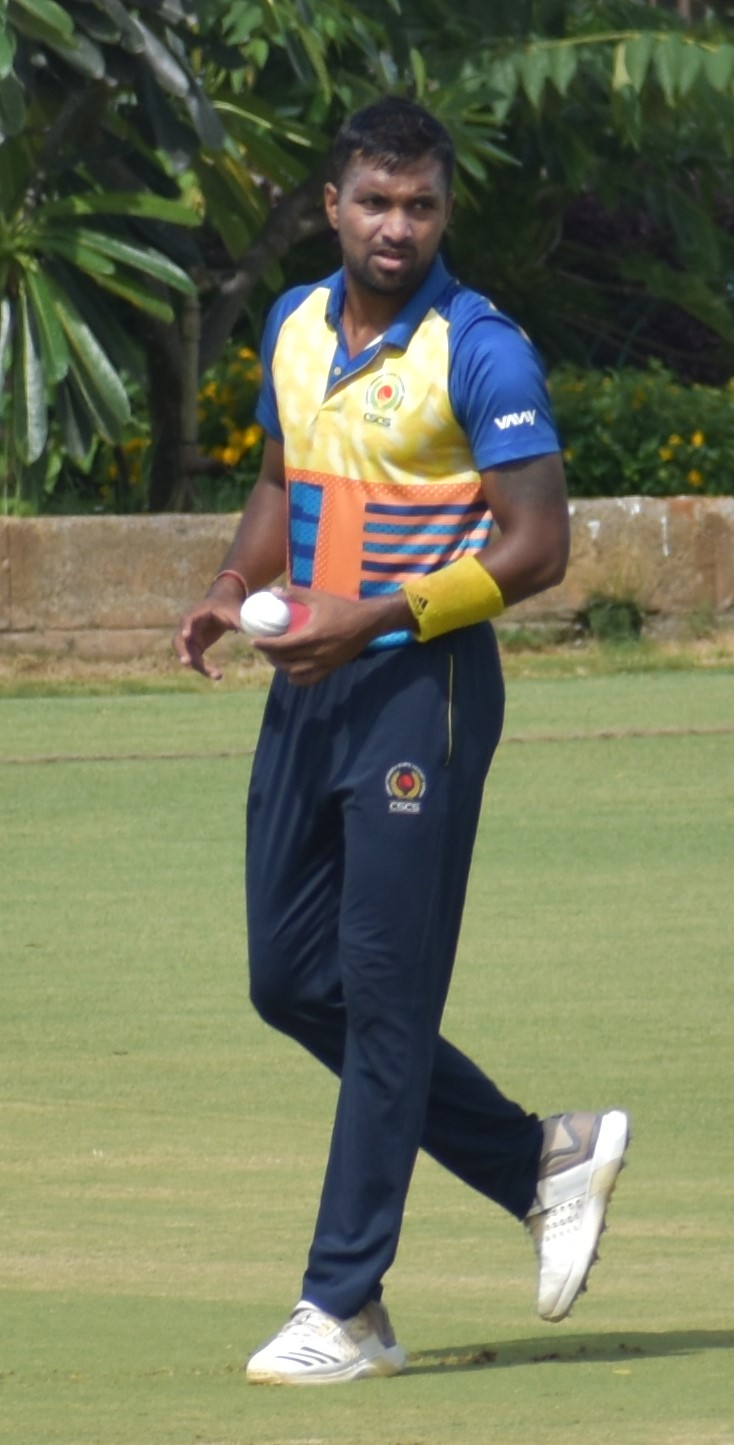
- Rao during the 2019–20 Vijay Hazare Trophy

Personal information
- Full name: Pankaj Kumar Rao
- Born: 19 October 1989 (age 37); Paradi Bobbili, Vizianagaram district, Andhra Pradesh, India
- Batting: Right-handed
- Bowling: Right-arm medium
- Role: Bowler

Domestic team information
- Years: Team
- 2009: Madhya Pradesh
- 2016-present: Chhattisgarh
- Source: ESPNcricinfo, 13 October 2016

Pankaj Kumar Rao (born 19 October 1989) is an Indian cricketer. He made his first-class debut for Chhattisgarh in the 2016–17 Ranji Trophy on 13 October 2016. He made his Twenty20 debut for Chhattisgarh in the 2016–17 Inter State Twenty-20 Tournament on 30 January 2017.

He was the leading wicket-taker for Chhattisgarh in the 2018–19 Vijay Hazare Trophy, with fifteen dismissals in six matches. He was also the leading wicket-taker for Chhattisgarh in the 2018–19 Ranji Trophy, with 29 dismissals in eight matches.
