= Bishal Ghosh =

Indian cricketer (born 1996)

Personal information
- Full name: Bishal Bimalkumar Ghosh
- Born: 27 April 1996 (age 30); Agartala, Tripura
- Source: ESPNcricinfo, 14 October 2016

Bishal Ghosh (born 27 April 1996) is an Indian cricketer. He made his first-class debut for Tripura in the 2014–15 Ranji Trophy on 7 December 2014. He made his Twenty20 debut for Tripura in the 2016–17 Inter State Twenty-20 Tournament on 29 January 2017. He made his List A debut for Tripura in the 2016–17 Vijay Hazare Trophy on 25 February 2017.

In November 2018, he became the third batsman to score a double century for Tripura in the Ranji Trophy, when he made 201 runs against Services.
