= Paidikalva Vijaykumar =

Indian cricketer (born 1986)

Personal information
- Born: 20 October 1986 (age 40); Andhra Pradesh, India

Domestic team information
- Years: Team
- 2006/07–2019/20: Andhra Pradesh
- 2008: Deccan Chargers
- Source: ESPNcricinfo, 7 October 2015

Paidikalva Vijaykumar (born 20 October 1986) is an Indian former cricketer who played for Andhra Pradesh and Deccan Chargers.
