= Amulaya Pandrekar =

Indian cricketer (born 1996)

Amulya Pandrekar
Personal information
- Full name: Amulya Govind Pandrekar
- Born: 31 March 1996 (age 30); Uttara Kannada, Karnataka, India
- Source: ESPNcricinfo, 14 October 2016

Amulya Pandrekar (born 31 March 1996) is an Indian cricketer. He made his first-class debut for Goa in the 2014–15 Ranji Trophy on 21 January 2015. He made his Twenty20 debut for Goa in the 2016–17 Inter State Twenty-20 Tournament on 3 February 2017. He made his List A debut for Goa in the 2016–17 Vijay Hazare Trophy on 28 February 2017.
