= Nikhil Kohli =

Indian cricketer (born 1996)

Personal information
- Born: 5 December 1996 (age 29); Jaipur, Rajasthan, India
- Source: ESPNcricinfo, 12 January 2021

Nikhil Kohli (born 5 December 1996) is an Indian cricketer. He made his Twenty20 debut on 12 January 2021, for Uttarakhand in the 2020–21 Syed Mushtaq Ali Trophy.
