= Dheeraj Kumar (Himachal Pradesh cricketer) =

Indian cricketer (born 1994)

Personal information
- Born: 18 August 1994 (age 32); Kullu
- Source: ESPNcricinfo, 26 February 2017

Dheeraj Kumar (born 18 August 1994) is an Indian cricketer. He made his List A debut for Himachal Pradesh in the 2016–17 Vijay Hazare Trophy on 26 February 2017.
