= Sourabh Majumdar =

Indian cricketer (born 1999)

Personal information
- Full name: Sourabh Jeevan Krishna Majumdar
- Born: 4 February 1999 (age 27); Jagdalpur, Chhattisgarh, India
- Batting: Right-handed
- Bowling: Right-arm medium-fast
- Role: Bowler
- Source: Cricinfo, 14 January 2021

Sourabh Majumdar (born 4 February 1999) is an Indian cricketer. He made his Twenty20 debut on 14 January 2021, for Chhattisgarh in the 2020–21 Syed Mushtaq Ali Trophy. He made his List A debut on 20 February 2021, for Chhattisgarh in the 2020–21 Vijay Hazare Trophy. He made his first-class debut on 17 February 2022, for Chhattisgarh in the 2021–22 Ranji Trophy.
