= Ajay Mandal =

Indian cricketer (born 1996)

Personal information
- Full name: Ajay Jadav Mandal
- Born: 25 February 1996 (age 30); Durg, Chhattisgarh, India
- Batting: Left-handed
- Bowling: Slow left-arm orthodox

Domestic team information
- Years: Team
- 2016–present: Chhattisgarh
- 2023–2024: Chennai Super Kings
- 2025–present: Delhi Capitals

Career statistics
Competition	FC	LA	T20
Matches	40	31	46
Runs scored	1,849	495	450
Batting average	35.55	24.75	17.30
100s/50s	4/9	0/1	0/0
Top score	241*	65*	49
Balls bowled	7,711	1,545	875
Wickets	125	33	44
Bowling average	28.62	36.09	23.56
5 wickets in innings	5	0	1
10 wickets in match	1	–	–
Best bowling	7/7	4/49	5/10
Catches/stumpings	23/–	7/–	11/–
- Source: ESPNcricinfo, 25 March 2025

Ajay Jadav Mandal (born 25 February 1996) is an Indian cricketer. He made his first-class debut for Chhattisgarh in the 2016–17 Ranji Trophy on 6 October 2016. He made his Twenty20 debut for Chhattisgarh in the 2016–17 Inter State Twenty-20 Tournament on 29 January 2017. He made his List A debut for Chhattisgarh in the 2018–19 Vijay Hazare Trophy on 30 September 2018.

Ajay Mandal scored 241* while batting at No.8 in Ranji Trophy game against Uttarakhand in 2019.

Ajay Mandal was the first bowler of Chhattisgarh to take 100 wickets in Ranji Trophy.

For the 2023 Season Ajay Mandal has signed for Doncaster Town Cricket Club as their overseas pro.

== IPL career ==
Ajay Mandal has been picked by Chennai Super Kings for the IPL 2023 edition as an all-rounder batsman. He was picked by CSK for INR 250,000 As of 7 April 2023, Ajay Mandal is yet to debut in the IPL.

In the 2025 IPL auction, Ajay Mandal was bought by the Delhi Capitals for ₹30 lakhs.
