= Sanidhya Hurkat =

Indian cricketer (born 1999)

Personal information
- Born: 31 July 1999 (age 27); Raipur, Chhattisgarh, India
- Batting: Right-handed
- Bowling: Right arm off break
- Source: Cricinfo, 5 February 2018

Sanidhya Hurkat (born 31 July 1999) is an Indian cricketer. He made his List A debut for Chhattisgarh in the 2017–18 Vijay Hazare Trophy on 5 February 2018. He made his Twenty20 debut on 18 January 2021, for Chhattisgarh in the 2020–21 Syed Mushtaq Ali Trophy. He made his first-class debut on 17 February 2022, for Chhattisgarh in the 2021–22 Ranji Trophy.
