= Nitin Saini =

Indian cricketer (born 1988)

Personal information
- Full name: Nitin Saini
- Born: 28 October 1988 (age 38); Rohtak, Haryana, India
- Batting: Right-handed
- Role: Wicket-keeper

Domestic team information
- Years: Team
- 2006/07–present: Haryana
- 2012: Kings XI Punjab

Career statistics
Competition	FC	List A	T20
Matches	79	53	50
Runs scored	4,724	1,258	754
Batting average	36.33	26.76	17.95
100s/50s	13/21	1/6	0/3
Top score	227	105	74*
Balls bowled	266	18	–
Wickets	6	0	–
Bowling average	26.16	–	–
5 wickets in innings	0	–	–
10 wickets in match	0	–	–
Best bowling	2/28	–	–
Catches/stumpings	201/20	57/10	39/15
- Source: ESPNcricinfo, 3 April 2018

Nitin Saini (born 28 October 1988) is a cricketer who plays for Haryana in Indian domestic cricket. He has also played for the Indian Premier League franchise team Kings XI Punjab. Saini is a right-hand wicket-keeper batsman who usually opens the batting.

== Career ==
Saini made his first-class cricket debut for Haryana at the age of 18 against Saurashtra during the 2006/07 season of the Ranji Trophy. He earned a permanent spot for his state side with impressive performances in all three formats of the game. In the 2011/12 season he scored 631 runs in eight matches at a batting average of 40, scoring five fifties and a hundred. Soon after he signed a contract with Kings XI Punjab to play in the 2012 Indian Premier League, only playing for the side in the one season.

Saini scored over 900 runs in the 2016/17 Ranji Trophy, one of the highest aggregates in the trophy's history.
