= Samar Dubhashi =

Indian cricketer (born 1995)

Personal information
- Full name: Samar Shravan Dubhashi
- Born: 22 September 1995 (age 31); Margao, Goa, India
- Source: ESPNcricinfo, 15 October 2016

Samar Dubhashi (born 22 September 1995) is an Indian cricketer. He made his first-class debut for Goa in the 2014–15 Ranji Trophy on 6 February 2015. He made his List A debut on 14 December 2021, for Goa in the 2021–22 Vijay Hazare Trophy.
