= Ravi Thakur (cricketer) =

Indian cricketer (born 1997)

Personal information
- Born: 15 December 1997 (age 28); Mandi, Himachal Pradesh, India
- Source: Cricinfo, 1 March 2017

Ravi Thakur (born 15 December 1997) is an Indian cricketer. He made his first-class debut for Himachal Pradesh in the 2016–17 Ranji Trophy on 29 November 2016. He made his List A debut for Himachal Pradesh in the 2016–17 Vijay Hazare Trophy on 1 March 2017. He made his Twenty20 debut on 10 January 2021, for Himachal Pradesh in the 2020–21 Syed Mushtaq Ali Trophy.
