= Abhimanyu Chauhan =

Indian cricketer (born 1986)

Abhimanyu RPS Chauhan
Personal information
- Full name: Abhimanyu Ravindra Pal Singh Chauhan
- Born: 29 July 1985 (age 41); Bhilai, Chhattisgarh, India
- Batting: Right-handed
- Bowling: Right-arm medium-fast
- Role: Batsman

Domestic team information
- Years: Team
- 2005/06–2018: Chhattisgarh cricket team

Career statistics
Competition	FC	LA	T20
Matches	19	4	4
Runs scored	805	95	33
Batting average	33.54	47.50	16.50
100s/50s	3/2	0/1	0/0
Top score	118	53*	17*
Balls bowled	1068	144	60
Wickets	9	5	5
Bowling average	55.66	26.80	15.80
5 wickets in innings	0	0	0
10 wickets in match	0	0	0
Best bowling	2/42	3/28	3/18
Catches/stumpings	9/–	0/–	2/–
- Source: ESPNcricinfo, 16 January 2013

Abhimanyu Ravindra Pal Singh Chauhan (born 29 July 1985 in Bhilai, Chhattisgarh, India) is an Chhattisgarh local cricketer who played for Chhattisgarh in domestic cricket. He is a right-handed middle-order batsman and right-arm medium-fast bowler.

== Personal life ==
Abhminayu Ravindra Pal Singh Chauhan lives in Bhilai with his parents after retiring from Cricket.
