= Shamsher Yadav =

Indian cricketer (born 1994)

Personal information
- Born: 12 December 1994 (age 31); Rohtak, India

Domestic team information
- Years: Team
- 2015–2017: Haryana
- 2017-: Services
- Source: Cricinfo, 6 December 2019

Shamsher Yadav (born 12 December 1994) is an Indian cricketer from Haryana, who plays for Services. He made his first-class debut on 23 November 2015 in the 2015–16 Ranji Trophy. He made his Twenty20 debut on 10 January 2016 in the 2015–16 Syed Mushtaq Ali Trophy.
