= Ashutosh Singh (cricketer) =

Indian cricketer (born 1994)

Personal information
- Born: 5 January 1994 (age 32); Ambikapur, Chhattisgarh, India
- Batting: Right-handed
- Bowling: Right-arm offbreak
- Role: All-rounder

Domestic team information
- Years: Team
- 2016-: Madhya Pradesh
- Source: ESPNcricinfo, 26 February 2016

Ashutosh Singh (born 5 January 1994) is an Indian cricketer who plays for Madhya Pradesh cricket team.

He made his Twenty20 debut against Railways cricket team at Assam cricket team at Reliance Stadium in January, 2016. He made his first-class debut for Chhattisgarh in the 2016–17 Ranji Trophy on 6 October 2016, scoring a century. He made his List A debut for Chhattisgarh in the 2016–17 Vijay Hazare Trophy on 25 February 2017.

He was the leading run-scorer for Chhattisgarh in the 2017–18 Ranji Trophy, with 467 runs in six matches. In July 2018, he was named in the squad for India Red for the 2018–19 Duleep Trophy. He was also the leading run-scorer for Chhattisgarh in the 2018–19 Vijay Hazare Trophy, with 211 runs in six matches. In 2022 he will be club professional for Netherfield CC in Kendal.
