= Sanjay Pahal =

Indian cricketer (born 1993)

Personal information
- Born: 29 June 1993 (age 33); Sonipat, Haryana, India
- Batting: Right-handed
- Bowling: Right arm medium
- Role: Bowler

Domestic team information
- Years: Team
- 2016–2024: Haryana
- Source: Cricinfo, 4 October 2015

Sanjay Pahal (born 29 June 1993) is an Indian first-class cricketer who plays for Haryana. He made his Twenty20 debut for Haryana in the 2016–17 Inter State Twenty-20 Tournament on 29 January 2017. His List A debut, also for Haryana, was in the 2016–17 Vijay Hazare Trophy on 4 March 2017. Pahal is a right-handed batsman and a right-arm medium bowler.
