= Sumit Ruikar =

Indian cricketer (born 1990)

Personal information
- Born: 6 June 1990 (age 36); Nagpur, Maharashtra, India
- Source: ESPNcricinfo, 28 October 2016

Sumit Ruikar (born 6 June 1990) is an Indian cricketer. He made his first-class debut for Vidarbha in the 2012–13 Ranji Trophy on 1 December 2012.

He was the leading wicket-taker for Chhattisgarh in the 2017–18 Ranji Trophy, with 23 dismissals in six matches.
