= Bhargav Bhatt (cricketer) =

Indian cricketer

Personal information
- Full name: Bhargav Ashok Bhatt
- Born: 13 May 1990 (age 36); Vadodara, Gujarat, India
- Batting: Left-handed
- Bowling: Slow left-arm orthodox
- Role: Bowler

Domestic team information
- Years: Team
- 2009/10–present: Baroda
- 2011–2013: Kings XI Punjab

Career statistics
Competition	FC	LA	T20
Matches	15	10	23
Runs scored	92	31	10
Batting average	6.13	7.75	5.00
100s/50s	0/0	0/0	0/0
Top score	18	12	6*
Balls bowled	3037	490	428
Wickets	60	11	20
Bowling average	26.31	30.81	29.75
5 wickets in innings	4	0	0
10 wickets in match	1	0	0
Best bowling	7/127	3/49	4/22
Catches/stumpings	6/–	7/–	7/-
- Source: ESPNcricinfo, 18 May 2012

Bhargav Bhatt (born 13 May 1990) is a cricketer who plays for Baroda in Indian domestic cricket. He is a slow left-arm orthodox bowler. He also plays for Kings XI Punjab in the Indian Premier League.

Bhatt, in his debut first-class season, picked up 47 wickets from 9 matches to become the highest wicket-taker of the season. His impressive showing was rewarded, as he got an IPL contract with the Kings XI Punjab franchise in 2011. He continued his good run in the Twenty20 format too with economic bowling. He had figures of 2.5-0-22-4 against the Mumbai Indians for which he earned the Man-of-the-Match award.

He was the leading wicket-taker for Andhra in the 2017–18 Ranji Trophy, with 27 dismissals in six matches. He was also the leading wicket-taker for Baroda in the 2018–19 Ranji Trophy, with 31 dismissals in eight matches.
