= Nikhil Patwardhan =

Indian cricketer (born 1977)

Personal information
- Born: 2 June 1977 (age 49); Indore, India

Umpiring information
- WODIs umpired: 1 (2018)
- Source: ESPNcricinfo, 12 October 2015

Nikhil Patwardhan (born 2 June 1977) is an Indian former first-class cricketer. He is now an umpire and has stood in matches in the 2015–16 Ranji Trophy.
