= 2016–17 Vijay Hazare Trophy =

Indian cricket tournament

- Dates: 25 February 2017 – 20 March 2017
- Administrator(s): BCCI
- Cricket format: List A cricket
- Tournament format(s): Round-robin and Playoff format
- Host(s): Various
- Champions: Tamil Nadu (5th title)
- Runners-up: Bengal
- Participants: 28
- Matches: 91
- Most runs: Dinesh Karthik (Tamil Nadu) (607)
- Most wickets: Aswin Crist (Tamil Nadu) (20)
- Official website: Official website

The 2016–17 Vijay Hazare Trophy was the 24th edition of the Vijay Hazare Trophy, an annual List A cricket tournament in India. It was held between 25 February and 20 March 2017. Tamil Nadu won the tournament, beating Bengal by 37 runs in the final.

== Teams ==
Group A (Host Delhi)	Group B (Host Odisha)	Group C (Host Chennai)	Group D (Host Kolkata)
Assam	Delhi	Andhra	Chhattisgarh
Baroda	Himachal Pradesh	Bengal	Hyderabad
Haryana	Kerala	Goa	Jammu & Kashmir
Odisha	Maharashtra	Gujarat	Jharkhand
Punjab	Tamil Nadu	Madhya Pradesh	Karnataka
Railways	Tripura	Mumbai	Saurashtra
Vidarbha	Uttar Pradesh	Rajasthan	Services

== Points table ==
=== Group A ===
Pos	Team	Pld	W	L	T	NR	Pts	NRR	Qualification
1	Vidarbha	6	5	1	0	0	20	0.776	Knockout Stage
2	Baroda	6	4	2	0	0	16	0.376	Knockout Stage
3	Haryana	6	3	3	0	0	12	−0.118	
4	Punjab	6	3	3	0	0	12	−0.227	
5	Odisha	6	2	4	0	0	8	0.208	
6	Railways	6	2	4	0	0	8	0.038	
7	Assam	6	2	4	0	0	8	−1.042	

=== Group B ===
Pos	Team	Pld	W	L	T	NR	Pts	NRR	Qualification
1	Tamil Nadu	6	5	1	0	0	20	1.734	Knockout Stage
2	Maharashtra	6	5	1	0	0	20	1.214	Knockout Stage
3	Uttar Pradesh	6	3	3	0	0	12	0.515	
4	Delhi	6	3	3	0	0	12	−0.687	
5	Tripura	6	3	3	0	0	12	−0.811	
6	Himachal Pradesh	6	1	5	0	0	4	−0.385	
7	Kerala	6	1	5	0	0	4	−1.448	

=== Group C ===
Pos	Team	Pld	W	L	T	NR	Pts	NRR	Qualification
1	Bengal	6	5	1	0	0	20	0.293	Knockout Stage
2	Gujarat	6	4	2	0	0	16	0.969	Knockout Stage
3	Mumbai	6	4	2	0	0	16	0.732	
4	Madhya Pradesh	6	3	3	0	0	12	0.283	
5	Andhra	6	3	3	0	0	12	−0.445	
6	Rajasthan	6	2	4	0	0	8	−0.325	
7	Goa	6	0	6	0	0	0	−1.917	

=== Group D ===
Pos	Team	Pld	W	L	T	NR	Pts	NRR	Qualification
1	Karnataka	6	6	0	0	0	24	1.439	Knockout Stage
2	Jharkhand	6	4	2	0	0	16	0.609	Knockout Stage
3	Hyderabad	6	4	2	0	0	16	−0.134	
4	Services	6	3	3	0	0	12	0.536	
5	Chhattisgarh	6	2	4	0	0	8	−0.724	
6	Saurashtra	6	1	5	0	0	4	−0.690	
7	Jammu & Kashmir	6	1	5	0	0	4	−0.840	

== Knockout stage ==
Quarterfinals
D1	Karnataka	233 (48.5 ov)
A2	Baroda	234/3 (45.5 ov)
B1	Tamil Nadu	217/5 (42.2 ov)
C2	Gujarat	211 (49.4 ov)
A1	Vidarbha	159/9 (50 ov)
D2	Jharkhand	165/4 (45.1 ov)
C1	Bengal	320/6 (49.5 ov)
B2	Maharashtra	318/6 (50 ov)

Semifinals
A2	Baroda	219 (49.3 ov)
B1	Tamil Nadu	220/4 (47.3 ov)
D2	Jharkhand	288 (50 ov)
C1	Bengal	329/4 (50 ov)

Final
B1	Tamil Nadu	217 (47.2 ov)
C1	Bengal	180 (45.5 overs)

=== Quarterfinals ===
Quarter Final 1
12 March 2017
Scorecard

Karnataka; 233 (48.5 overs)	v	Baroda; 234/3 (45.5 overs)
Pavan Deshpande 54 (59); Krunal Pandya 3/32 (6 overs)		Kedar Devdhar 78 (98); Sreenath Aravind 2/42 (7 overs)

Baroda won by 7 wickets
Feroz Shah Kotla Ground, Delhi
Umpires: Ulhas Gandhe and Navdeep Singh

- Baroda won the toss and decided to field.

Quarter Final 2
12 March 2017
Scorecard

Gujarat; 211 (49.4 overs)	v	Tamil Nadu; 217/5 (42.2 overs)
Rujul Bhatt 83* (98); Vijay Shankar 3/48 (10 overs)		Ganga Sridhar Raju 85 (95); Priyank Panchal 1/8 (2 overs)

Tamil Nadu won by 5 wickets
Palam A Ground, Model Sports Complex, Delhi
Umpires: Virender Sharma and Tapan Sharma

- Gujarat won the toss and decided to bat.
- Ravisrinivasan Sai Kishore (Tamil Nadu) made his List A debut.

Quarter Final 3
15 March 2017
Scorecard

Vidarbha; 159/9 (50 overs)	v	Jharkhand; 165/4 (45.1 overs)
Ravi Jangid 62 (115); Monu Kumar 2/27 (9 overs)		Ishan Kishan 35 (87); Ravikumar Thakur 2/25 (10 overs)

Jharkhand won by 6 wickets
Palam A Ground, Model Sports Complex, Delhi
Umpires: Navdeep Singh and Virender Sharma

- Vidarbha won the toss and elected to bat.
- Pratyush Singh (Jharkhand) made his List A debut.

Quarter Final 4
15 March 2017
Scorecard

Maharashtra; 318/6 (50 overs)	v	Bengal; 320/6 (49.5 overs)
Rahul Tripathi 95 (74); Sayan Ghosh 2/61 (10 overs)		Shreevats Goswami 74 (88); Kedar Jadhav 2/30 (6 overs)

Bengal won by 4 wickets
Feroz Shah Kotla Ground, Delhi
Umpires: Ulhas Gandhe and Nikhil Patwardhan

- Maharashtra won the toss and elected to bat.
- Agniv Pan (Bengal) made his List A debut.

=== Semifinals ===
Semi Final 1
16 March 2017
Scorecard

Baroda; 219 (49.3 overs)	v	Tamil Nadu; 220/4 (47.3 overs)
Kedar Devdhar 46 (63); Sai Kishore 4/59 (10 overs)		Dinesh Karthik 77 (107); Atit Sheth 3/36 (8 overs)

Tamil Nadu won by 6 wickets
Feroz Shah Kotla Ground, Delhi
Umpires: Nikhil Patwardhan and Tapan Sharma
Player of the match: Dinesh Karthik

- Baroda won the toss and elected to bat.

Semi Final 2
18 March 2017
Scorecard

Bengal; 329/4 (50 overs)	v	Jharkhand; 288 (50 overs)
Shreevats Goswami 101 (99); Varun Aaron 2/89 (10 overs)		M S Dhoni 70 (62); Pragyan Ojha 5/71 (10 overs)

Bengal won by 41 runs
Feroz Shah Kotla Ground, Delhi
Umpires: Navdeep Singh and Virender Sharma
Player of the match: Shreevats Goswami

- Jharkhand won the toss and elected to field.

=== Final ===
20 March 2017
Scorecard

Tamil Nadu; 217 (47.2 overs)	v	Bengal; 180 (45.5 overs)
Dinesh Karthik 112 (120); Mohammed Shami 4/26 (8.2 overs)		Sudip Chatterjee 58 (79); Aswin Crist 2/23 (7 overs)

Tamil Nadu won by 37 runs
Feroz Shah Kotla Ground, Delhi
Umpires: Navdeep Singh and Virender Sharma
Player of the match: Dinesh Karthik (Tamil Nadu)

- Tamil Nadu won the toss and elected to bat.
