= Chhattisgarh cricket team =

Indian cricket team

Personnel
- Captain: Anuj Twary
- Coach: Aniruddh Singh
- Owner: Chhattisgarh State Cricket Sangh

Team information
- Founded: 2016
- Home ground: Shaheed Veer Narayan Singh International Cricket Stadium
- Capacity: 49,000

History
- First-class debut: Tripura in 2016 at JSCA Oval Ground, Ranchi
- Ranji Trophy wins: 0
- Irani Trophy wins: 0
- Vijay Hazare Trophy wins: 0
- Official website: BCCI

Chhattisgarh cricket team is a cricket team from the state of Chhattisgarh, India.

Chhattisgarh began playing in Indian domestic tournaments, including the Ranji Trophy, starting in the 2016–17 season. The team is managed by the Chhattisgarh State Cricket Sangh, which was granted the full-member status by the Board of Control for Cricket in India in February 2016. The team made its first-class cricket debut in Group C of the 2016–17 Ranji Trophy against Tripura on 6 October 2016. They won the match by nine wickets. The 49,000-capacity SVNS International Cricket Stadium is the main venue for the team.

== History ==
In 2013/14, Chhattisgarh Under-16 and Under-25 teams finished at the bottom of their respective groups in the Vijay Merchant Trophy's zonal league and CK Nayudu Trophy's plate league, respectively. Their Under-19 team, however, finished third in their group in the Cooch Behar Trophy plate league and missed qualifying for the semi-finals of the lower tier by a whisker.

According to the BCCI regulations, an associate member can be promoted as a full member if the said member is an Associate Member for a continuous period of five cricketing seasons, and such a member satisfies the board that the game in its jurisdiction has reached a standard justifying its participation in the national tournament of Ranji Trophy.

Chhattisgarh gained associate member status in 2008, and was given full membership in February 2016. This meant that Chhattisgarh would participate in the domestic tournaments (Ranji Trophy, Vijay Hazare Trophy and Syed Mushtaq Ali Trophy) from the 2016–17 season. Chhattisgarh will play in the Group C of the Ranji Trophy, taking the number of teams in the group to 10. CSCS secretary Rajesh Dave expects Ashutosh Singh, Harpreet Singh, Jalaj Saxena, Jatin Saxena (all Madhya Pradesh), Abhimanyu Chauhan, Sahil Gupta (both Baroda) and Bhima Rao (Railways) to play for the new Chhattisgarh team, along with India under-19 cricketer Amandeep Khare.

In July 2016, former Mumbai and Vidarbha coach Sulakshan Kulkarni was named as head coach of team. He will remain with the team for three seasons starting from 2016–17 Ranji Trophy. Mohammad Kaif has been appointed as the first captain.

== Notable cricketers ==
Notable cricketers from the state:

- Harpreet Singh
- Amandeep Khare
- Ajay Mandal
- Rajesh Chauhan

Mohammad Kaif who is originally from Uttar Pradesh played 2 seasons for Chhattisgarh (2016-18)

== Squad ==
Name	Birth date	Batting Style	Bowling Style	Notes
Batsmen
Amandeep Khare	5 August 1997 (age 29)	Right-handed	Right-arm medium	
Aayush Pandey	19 September 2003 (age 23)	Left-handed	Right-arm off break	
Sanjeet Desai	12 December 1997 (age 28)	Right-handed	Right-arm leg break	
Anuj Tiwary	28 November 1996 (age 29)	Left-handed	Right-arm off break	Captain
Ashutosh Singh	5 January 1994 (age 32)	Right-handed	Right-arm off break	
Prateek Yadav	16 February 1999 (age 27)	Left-handed		
Sanidhya Hurkat	31 July 1999 (age 27)	Right-handed	Right-arm off break	
All-rounder
Vikalp Tiwari	24 September 2009 (age 17)	Left-handed	Slow left arm orthodox	
Gagandeep Singh	11 September 1997 (age 29)	Left-handed	Slow left arm orthodox	
Jayant Yadav	22 January 1990 (age 36)	Right-handed	Right-arm off break	Plays for Gujarat Titans in IPL
Wicket-keepers
Mayank Verma	22 October 2003 (age 23)	Right-handed		
Shashank Chandrakar	13 May 1994 (age 32)	Right-handed		
Rahul Pradhan	12 September 2003 (age 23)	Left-handed		
Spin bowlers
Ajay Mandal	15 February 1996 (age 30)	Left-handed	Slow left arm orthodox	Plays for Delhi Capitals in IPL
Shubham Agarwal	21 November 1993 (age 32)	Right-handed	Right-arm leg break	
Dharmendra Jadeja	4 August 1990 (age 36)	Left-handed	Slow left-arm orthodox	
Pace bowlers
Sourabh Majumdar	4 February 1999 (age 27)	Right-handed	Right-arm medium	
Dev Aditya Singh	6 November 2003 (age 23)	Right-handed	Right-arm medium	
Vashudev Bareth	10 March 2003 (age 23)	Right-handed	Right-arm medium-fast	
Harsh Yadav	18 November 2000 (age 26)	Right-handed	Right-arm medium	
Sandeep Warrier	4 April 1991 (age 35)	Right-handed	Right-arm medium-fast	Vice-captain
Rudra Dehari	29 August 2007 (age 19)	Right-handed	Right-arm medium	

Updated as on 18 November 2026

== Coaching staff ==
- Head coach: Hitesh Goswami
- Trainer: Swadesh Nagare
- Physio: Kishore Nakhale
- video analyst: Yogesh Verma

== Home grounds ==
Chhattisgarh play the majority of their home matches at the Shaheed Veer Narayan Singh International Cricket Stadium.

=== Other grounds ===
There are 10 ground in the state that can host first-class games.
