= 2016–17 Ranji Trophy =

Cricket tournament

- The Ranji Trophy, awarded to the winners
- Dates: 6 October 2016 – 14 January 2017
- Administrator: BCCI
- Cricket format: First-class cricket
- Tournament format: Round-robin then knockout
- Host: India
- Champions: Gujarat (1st title)
- Participants: 28
- Most runs: Priyank Panchal (1,310) (Gujarat)
- Most wickets: Shahbaz Nadeem (56) (Jharkhand)

The 2016–17 Ranji Trophy was the 83rd season of the Ranji Trophy, the premier first-class cricket tournament in India. Unlike previous seasons, the 2016–17 tournament was played at neutral venues. Captains and coaches were supportive of the change. Chhattisgarh cricket team made their debut in the competition, becoming the 28th team to compete in this edition of the Ranji Trophy. Mumbai were the defending champions. Gujarat beat Mumbai in the final by 5 wickets to win their first title.

In September 2016, the Board of Control for Cricket in India (BCCI) announced the dates, groups and fixtures for the competition. The pink ball was used in the tournament, to help the BCCI make a decision on playing a day/night Test match.

In October 2016 during the Group B fixture between Maharashtra and Delhi, Swapnil Gugale and Ankit Bawne playing for Maharashtra, set a record partnership total in the Ranji Trophy, with 594 runs. It was also the second-highest partnership in the history of first-class cricket.

Two group stage fixtures, the Group A match between Gujarat and Bengal and the Group C match between Hyderabad and Tripura, were abandoned because of smog pollution. Initially, the BCCI rescheduled the fixtures to take place after the conclusion of the group stages. As a result of the rescheduled matches, the dates of the matches in the knockout phase of the competition were moved back to accommodate the rearranged fixtures. Both the Mumbai Cricket Association (MCA) and the Tamil Nadu Cricket Association (TNCA) opposed the rescheduling of the fixtures. The MCA joint-secretary Unmesh Khanvilkar said that it "gives unfair advantage to the participating teams with respect to their qualification the knockout phase". Kasi Viswanathan, secretary of the TNCA, said that "the matches should not be rescheduled and that points should be shared". The BCCI reviewed the decision to reschedule the matches. In December 2016, they revoked the changes and awarded each team one point from the abandoned matches.

Mumbai, Gujarat and Tamil Nadu from Group A, Jharkhand, Karnataka and Odisha from Group B and Hyderabad and Haryana from Group C all qualified for the knockout stage of the tournament. The dates of the quarter-finals were brought forward by one day and the semi-finals by two days. The Holkar Stadium in Indore hosted the final on 10 January 2017, two days earlier than originally planned.

In the semi-finals Gujarat beat Jharkhand by 123 runs to reach only their second final in the history of the Ranji Trophy, having previously played in the 1950–51 final. Mumbai beat Tamil Nadu by 6 wickets to progress to their 46th final in the Ranji Trophy.

== Personnel changes ==
=== Players ===
Player/Coach	From	To	Role
S Badrinath	Vidarbha	Hyderabad	Batsman
Iqbal Abdulla	Mumbai	Kerala	All-rounder
Ambati Rayudu	Baroda	Vidarbha	Batsman
Mohammad Kaif	Andhra	Chhattisgarh	Batsman
Bhavin Thakkar	Mumbai	Kerala	Bowler
Hanuma Vihari	Hyderabad	Andhra	All-rounder
Bhargav Bhatt	Gujarat	Andhra	All-rounder
Dwaraka Ravi Teja	Hyderabad	Andhra	All-rounder
Ashutosh Singh	Madhya Pradesh	Chhattisgarh	Batsman
Pankaj Rao	Madhya Pradesh	Chhattisgarh	Batsman
Sumit Ruikar	Vidarbha	Chhattisgarh	Batsman
Manjeet Singh	Rajasthan	Railways	Batsman
Nikhil Doru	Rajasthan	Railways	Batsman
Jalaj Saxena	Madhya Pradesh	Kerala	All-rounder
Mittal Ravaliya	Baroda	Chhattisgarh	Batsman
Prasanth Parameswaran	Goa	Kerala	Bowler
Anustup Majumdar	Railways	Bengal	Batsman
Smit Patel	Gujarat	Tripura	Wicket-keeper
Yashpal Singh	Services	Tripura	Batsman

=== Coaches ===
Coach	From	To	Role
Bharat Arun	Vidarbha	Hyderabad	Coach
Sulakshan Kulkarni		Chhattisgarh	Coach
Hrishikesh Kanitkar	Goa	Tamil Nadu	Coach
Sunil Joshi	Jammu & Kashmir	Assam	Coach
Shrikant Kalyani		Maharashtra	Coach
Jacob Martin		Baroda	Coach
Jai Prakash Yadav		Railways	Coach
Sanath Kumar	Assam	Andhra	Coach
Akshay Tandale		Maharashtra	Asst. Coach
KP Bhaskar		Delhi	Coach
Amit Bhandari		Delhi	Asst. Coach

== Teams ==
The teams were drawn in the following groups:

Group A

- Baroda
- Bengal
- Gujarat
- Madhya Pradesh
- Mumbai
- Punjab
- Railways
- Tamil Nadu
- Uttar Pradesh

Group B

- Assam
- Delhi
- Jharkhand
- Karnataka
- Maharashtra
- Odisha
- Rajasthan
- Saurashtra
- Vidarbha

Group C

- Andhra Pradesh
- Chhattisgarh
- Goa
- Haryana
- Himachal Pradesh
- Hyderabad
- Jammu & Kashmir
- Kerala
- Services
- Tripura

== Group A ==
Points table

Team	Pld	W	L	D	A	Pts	NRR
Mumbai	8	3	0	5	0	30	+0.027
Gujarat	8	2	0	5	1	26	+0.368
Tamil Nadu	8	2	1	5	0	26	+0.164
Punjab	8	2	1	5	0	21	+0.109
Bengal	8	2	1	4	1	21	–0.235
Madhya Pradesh	8	2	1	5	0	20	+0.024
Uttar Pradesh	8	1	4	3	0	13	–0.124
Baroda	8	1	3	4	0	10	–0.003
Railways	8	1	5	2	0	10	–0.368

- Top three teams advanced to knockout stage.

== Group B ==
Points table

Team	Pld	W	L	D	A	Pts	NRR
Jharkhand	8	5	0	3	0	39	+0.399
Karnataka	8	5	1	2	0	37	+0.273
Odisha	8	2	1	5	0	22	+0.054
Delhi	8	2	2	4	0	21	+0.579
Maharashtra	8	2	3	3	0	21	–0.059
Vidarbha	8	2	2	4	0	20	–0.025
Saurashtra	8	2	4	2	0	18	+0.101
Rajasthan	8	1	4	3	0	12	–0.637
Assam	8	1	5	2	0	8	–0.620

- Top three teams advanced to knockout stage.

== Group C ==
Points table

Team	Pld	W	L	D	A	Pts	NRR
Hyderabad	9	4	1	3	1	31	–0.117
Haryana	9	3	1	5	0	31	+0.218
Andhra	9	3	1	5	0	28	+0.119
Himachal Pradesh	9	3	0	6	0	26	+0.664
Kerala	9	1	1	7	0	25	+0.206
Goa	9	2	3	4	0	18	–0.330
Services	9	1	2	6	0	16	–0.177
Jammu and Kashmir	9	1	3	5	0	15	–0.383
Chhattisgarh	9	1	4	4	0	14	–0.011
Tripura	9	1	4	3	1	14	–0.196

- Top two teams advanced to knockout stage

== Knockout stage ==
Quarterfinals
A1	Mumbai	294 & 217
C1	Hyderabad	280 & 201
A3	Tamil Nadu	152 & 87/3
B2	Karnataka	88 & 150
A2	Gujarat	263 & 641
B3	Odisha	199 & 81/1
C2	Haryana	258 & 262
B1	Jharkhand	345 & 178/5

Semifinals
A1	Mumbai	411 & 251/4
A3	Tamil Nadu	305 & 356/6d
A2	Gujarat	390 & 252
B1	Jharkhand	408 & 111

Final
A1	Mumbai	228 & 411
A2	Gujarat	328 & 313/5

=== Quarter-finals ===
23–27 December 2016
Quarter-final 1
Scorecard

Mumbai	v	Hyderabad
294 (101.4 overs); Siddhesh Lad 110 (205); Chama Milind 5/80 (23.4 overs)		280 (125.1 overs); Tanmay Agarwal 82 (284); Abhishek Nayar 4/60 (29 overs)
217 (83.2 overs); Aditya Tare 57 (100); Mohammed Siraj 5/52 (14.2 overs)		201 (71 overs); Balchander Anirudh 84* (187); Abhishek Nayar 5/40 (20 overs)

Mumbai won by 30 runs
Shaheed Veer Narayan Singh International Stadium, Raipur
Umpires: Ulhas Gandhe and Nitin Pandit
Player of the match: Abhishek Nayar (Mumbai)

- Mumbai won the toss and elected to bat.

23–27 December 2016
Quarter-final 2
Scorecard

Karnataka	v	Tamil Nadu
88 (37.1 overs); Manish Pandey 28 (52); Aswin Crist 6/31 (13.1 overs)		152 (53.3 overs); Vijay Shankar 34 (61); Sreenath Aravind 3/16 (17 overs)
150 (38.1 overs); KL Rahul 77 (94); Krishnamoorthy Vignesh 4/53 (13 overs)		87/3 (19.3 overs); Dinesh Karthik 41* (30); Abhimanyu Mithun 1/7 (2 overs)

Tamil Nadu won by 7 wickets
Dr. Y.S. Rajasekhara Reddy ACA-VDCA Cricket Stadium, Visakhapatnam
Umpires: Navdeep Singh and Nikhil Patwardhan
Player of the match: Aswin Crist (Tamil Nadu)

- Tamil Nadu won the toss and elected to field.
- Dinesh Karthik (Tamil Nadu) played in his 100th Ranji Trophy match.

23–27 December 2016
Quarter-final 3
Scorecard

Gujarat	v	Odisha
263 (95.4 overs); Chirag Gandhi 81 (190); Deepak Behera 5/68 (22.4 overs)		199 (73.1 overs); Suryakant Pradhan 47 (27); Jasprit Bumrah 5/41 (23 overs)
641 (227.4 overs); Samit Gohel 359* (723); Dhiraj Singh 6/147 (68 overs)		81/1 (22.0 overs); Subhranshu Senapati 59* (58); Rujul Bhatt 1/23 (9 overs)

Match drawn
(Gujarat won on 1st innings)
Sawai Mansingh Stadium, Jaipur
Umpires: Yeshwant Barde and C. K. Nandan
Player of the match: Jasprit Bumrah (Gujarat)

- Odisha won the toss and elected to field.
- Samit Gohel (Gujarat) scored his first triple century in first-class cricket and the 40th triple century in the Ranji Trophy. His 359 not out is the highest score for carrying the bat in first-class cricket.

23–27 December 2016
Quarter-final 4
Scorecard

Haryana	v	Jharkhand
258 (95.3 overs); Rajat Paliwal 42 (111); Shahbaz Nadeem 7/79 (33 overs)		345 (120 overs); Virat Singh 107 (318); Harshal Patel 4/46 (19 overs)
262 (97.1 overs); Chaitanya Bishnoi 52 (105); Shahbaz Nadeem 4/78 (35.1 overs)		178/5 (30.2 overs); Ishan Kishan 86 (61); Sanjay Pahal 2/36 (7 overs)

Jharkhand won by 5 wickets
Moti Bagh Stadium, Vadodara
Umpires: Anil Dandekar and Pashchim Pathak
Player of the match: Shahbaz Nadeem (Jharkhand)

- Haryana won the toss and elected to bat.

=== Semi-finals ===
1–5 January 2017
1st Semi-final
Scorecard

Tamil Nadu	v	Mumbai
305 (115.2 overs); Baba Indrajith 64 (114); Abhishek Nayar 4/66 (29 overs)		406 (150.3 overs); Aditya Tare 83 (181); Vijay Shankar 4/59 (20 overs)
356/6d (78 overs); Baba Indrajith 138 (169); Balwinder Sandhu 2/67 (15 overs)		251/4 (62.1 overs); Prithvi Shaw 120 (175); Aushik Srinivas 2/77 (23 overs)

Mumbai won by 6 wickets
Saurashtra Cricket Association Stadium, Rajkot
Umpires: Abhijit Deshmukh and Virender Sharma
Player of the match: Prithvi Shaw (Mumbai)

- Tamil Nadu won the toss and elected to bat.
- Prithvi Shaw (Mumbai) and Ganga Sridhar Raju (Tamil Nadu) both made their first-class debuts.
- Prithvi Shaw became the first player for Mumbai to score a century on debut in the Ranji Trophy since Amol Muzumdar did so in the 1993–94 tournament.

1–5 January 2017
2nd Semi-final
Scorecard

Gujarat	v	Jharkhand
390 (126.2 overs); Priyank Panchal 149 (267); Ajay Yadav 3/67 (22 overs)		408 (102 overs); Ishank Jaggi 129 (182); R. P. Singh 6/90 (21 overs)
252 (81 overs); Manpreet Juneja 81 (125); Shahbaz Nadeem 5/69 (25 overs)		111 (41 overs); Kaushal Singh 24 (40); Jasprit Bumrah 6/29 (14 overs)

Gujarat won by 123 runs
Vidarbha Cricket Association Ground, Nagpur
Umpires: K. N. Ananthapadmanabhan and Jayaraman Madanagopal
Player of the match: Jasprit Bumrah (Gujarat)

- Gujarat won the toss and elected to bat.

=== Final ===
10–14 January 2017
Final
Scorecard

Mumbai	v	Gujarat
228 (83.5 overs); Prithvi Shaw 71 (93); Rujul Bhatt 2/5 (5 overs)		328 (104.3 overs); Parthiv Patel 90 (146); Shardul Thakur 4/84 (29.3 overs)
411 (137.1 overs); Abhishek Nayar 91* (145); Chintan Gaja 6/121 (39 overs)		313/5 (89.5 overs); Parthiv Patel 143 (196); Balwinder Sandhu 2/101 (24 overs)

Gujarat won by 5 wickets
Holkar Stadium, Indore
Umpires: Anil Chaudhary and Nitin Menon
Player of the match: Parthiv Patel (Gujarat)

- Gujarat won the toss and elected to field.
- This was the highest successful run-chase in the final of the Ranji Trophy.
