= 2016–17 Ranji Trophy Group A =

Cricket tournament

2016-17 Ranji Trophy Group A
- The Ranji Trophy, awarded to the winners
- Dates: 6 October 2016 – 10 December 2016
- Administrator: BCCI
- Cricket format: First-class cricket
- Tournament format: Round-robin
- Host: India
- Participants: 9

The 2016–17 Ranji Trophy was the 83rd season of the Ranji Trophy, the first-class cricket tournament in India. It was contested by 28 teams divided into three groups. Groups A and B comprised nine teams, and Group C comprised ten teams. Mumbai finished top of Group A, qualifying for the knockout stage of the tournament, along with Gujarat and Tamil Nadu.

== Points table ==
Team	Pld	W	L	D	A	Pts	NRR
Mumbai	8	3	0	5	0	30	+0.027
Gujarat	8	2	0	5	1	26	+0.368
Tamil Nadu	8	2	1	5	0	26	+0.164
Punjab	8	2	1	5	0	21	+0.109
Bengal	8	2	1	4	1	21	–0.235
Madhya Pradesh	8	2	1	5	0	20	+0.024
Uttar Pradesh	8	1	4	3	0	13	–0.124
Baroda	8	1	3	4	0	10	–0.003
Railways	8	1	5	2	0	10	–0.368

- Top three teams advanced to knockout stage.

== Fixtures ==
=== Round 1 ===
6–9 October
Scorecard

Tamil Nadu	v	Mumbai
87 (45.3 overs); Baba Indrajith 28* (79); Tushar Deshpande 4/25 (14.3 overs)		176 (67 overs); Aditya Tare 48 (87); Krishnamoorthy Vignesh 5/41 (18 overs)
185 (62.4 overs); Abhinav Mukund 56 (113); Dhawal Kulkarni 6/47 (19.4 overs)		97/8 (35.3 overs); Abhishek Nayar 45* (56); Krishnamoorthy Vignesh 4/29 (12.3 overs)

Mumbai won by 2 wickets
Chaudhary Bansi Lal Cricket Stadium, Rohtak
Umpires: Navdeep Singh and Virender Sharma
Player of the match: Dhawal Kulkarni (Mumbai)

- Mumbai won the toss and elected to field.
- Armaan Jaffer, Tushar Deshpande and Vijay Gohil (Mumbai); Krishnamoorthy Vignesh and Washington Sundar (Tamil Nadu) all made their first-class debuts.

6–9 October
Scorecard

Baroda	v	Gujarat
544/8d (155 overs); Aditya Waghmode 142 (308); Axar Patel 3/136 (33 overs)		554/4 (178 overs); Manpreet Juneja 201* (334); Krunal Pandya 2/50 (17 overs)

Match drawn
Sawai Mansingh Stadium, Jaipur
Umpires: Yeshwant Barde and Nitin Pandit
Player of the match: Manpreet Juneja (Gujarat)

- Gujarat won the toss and elected to field.
- Krunal Pandya (Baroda) made his first-class debut.

6–9 October
Scorecard

Railways	v	Punjab
331 (118 overs); Shivakant Shukla 128 (322); Siddarth Kaul 5/68 (22 overs)		215 (80.1 overs); Gurkeerat Singh 66 (98); Manjeet Singh 4/56 (15 overs)
245/7d (81.2 overs); Shivakant Shukla 97 (224); Vinay Choudhary 3/63 (15.2 overs)		170/3 (58 overs); Uday Kaul 61* (160); Anureet Singh 1/22 (5 overs)

Match drawn
Palam A Ground, Delhi
Umpires: Anil Dandekar and Krishnamachari Srinivasan
Player of the match: Shivakant Shukla (Railways)

- Punjab won the toss and elected to field.

6–9 October
Scorecard

Madhya Pradesh	v	Uttar Pradesh
465 (12.5 overs); Harpreet Singh 216* (274); Imtiaz Ahmed 3/58 (20 overs)		176 (63.2 overs); Eklavya Dwivedi 37 (94); Gaurav Yadav 4/44 (22 overs)
		225 (99.4 overs) (f/o); Tanmay Srivastava 93 (310); Chandrakant Sakure 6/40 (23.4 overs)

Madhya Pradesh won by an innings and 64 runs
Rajiv Gandhi International Cricket Stadium, Hyderabad
Umpires: Saiyed Khalid and Nand Kishore
Player of the match: Harpreet Singh (Madhya Pradesh)

- Madhya Pradesh won the toss and elected to bat.
- Mukul Raghav (Madhya Pradesh) made his first-class debut.

=== Round 2 ===
13–16 October
Scorecard

Tamil Nadu	v	Railways
121 (39.2 overs); Malolan Rangarajan 36* (50); Deepak Bansal 4/48 (15 overs)		173 (64 overs); Mrunal Devdhar 47 (82); T. Natarajan 4/51 (16 overs)
452/8d (132 overs); Dinesh Karthik 163 (145); Karn Sharma 4/109 (26 overs)		226 (82.2 overs); Saurabh Wakaskar 120 (233); Malolan Rangarajan 4/37 (13.2 overs)

Tamil Nadu won by 174 runs
Lohnu Cricket Ground, Bilaspur
Umpires: Vineet Kulkarni and Rohan Pandit
Player of the match: Dinesh Karthik (Tamil Nadu)

- Railways won the toss and elected to field.
- Mrunal Devdhar (Railways) made his first-class debut.

13–16 October
Scorecard

Baroda	v	Mumbai
305 (86.1 overs); Pinal Shah 66 (125); Vijay Gohil 3/70 (16 overs)		323 (92.5 overs); Akhil Herwadkar 106 (216); Irfan Pathan 3/30 (15.5 overs)
383/5d (94 overs); Kedar Devdhar 145 (235); Tushar Deshpande 2/61 (11 overs)		224/5 (77 overs); Aditya Tare 63* (162); Murtuja Vahora 2/32 (15 overs)

Match drawn
Palam A Ground, Delhi
Umpires: Puttarangaiah Jayapal and Jayaraman Madanagopal
Player of the match: Akhil Herwadkar (Mumbai)

- Baroda won the toss and elected to bat.

13–16 October
Scorecard

Punjab	v	Madhya Pradesh
378 (108.2 overs); Yuvraj Singh 177 (295); Ishwar Pandey 8/102 (36.2 overs)		247 (87 overs); Shubham Sharma 53 (102); Manpreet Gony 6/36 (22 overs)
175/dd (51.3 overs); Yuvraj Singh 76 (120); Ishwar Pandey 3/25 (14 overs)		180 (64.4 overs); Shubham Sharma 37 (107); Manpreet Gony 4/41 (13 overs)

Punjab won by 126 runs
CH Bansi Lal Cricket Stadium, Rohtak
Umpires: Anil Dandekar and Krishnamachari Srinivasan
Player of the match: Yuvraj Singh (Punjab)

- Madhya Pradesh won the toss and elected to field.
- Shubek Gill (Punjab) made his first-class debut.

13–16 October
Scorecard

Bengal	v	Uttar Pradesh
466 (139.2 overs); Abhimanyu Easwaran 142 (285); Kuldeep Yadav 5/115 (37 overs)		410 (112.4 overs); Umang Sharma 136 (247); Aamir Gani 3/72 (22 overs)
274/6d (76 overs); Abhimanyu Easwaran 110* (209); Kuldeep Yadav 4/107 (26 overs)		70/0 (20 overs); Tanmay Srivastava 31* (57)

Match drawn
Sawai Mansingh Stadium, Jaipur
Umpires: Yeshwant Barde and Chirra Ravikanthreddy
Player of the match: Abhimanyu Easwaran (Bengal)

- Bengal won the toss and elected to bat.
- Agniv Pan (Bengal) and Samarth Singh (Uttar Pradesh) both made their first-class debuts.

=== Round 3 ===
20–23 October
Scorecard

Madhya Pradesh	v	Mumbai
445 (160 overs); Rajat Patidar 106 (246); Vijay Gohil 3/87 (38 overs)		568/7d (184.1 overs); Akhil Herwadkar 153 (358); Ishwar Pandey 3/122 (34 overs)

Match drawn
Shaheed Veer Narayan Singh International Stadium, Raipur
Umpires: Saiyed Khalid and Shavir Tarapore
Player of the match: Akhil Herwadkar (Mumbai)

- Madhya Pradesh won the toss and elected to bat.

20–23 October
Scorecard

Bengal	v	Punjab
404 (120.3) overs Sayan Mondal 135 (200); Sandeep Sharma 4/96 (29 overs)		271 (81.3 overs); Uday Kaul 77 (149); Ashok Dinda 5/58 (22.3 overs)
226 (64.5 overs); Manoj Tiwary 92 (130); Siddarth Kaul 6/57 (20 overs)		244 (72.3 overs); Manan Vohra 75 (112); Pragyan Ojha 4/70 (21 overs)

Bengal won by 115 runs
Lohnu Cricket Ground, Bilaspur
Umpires: Yeshwant Barde and Ravi Subramanian
Player of the match: Sayan Mondal (Bengal)

- Punjab won the toss and elected to field.
- Ayan Bhattacharjee and Amit Kuila (Bengal) both made their first-class debuts.

20–23 October
Scorecard

Gujarat	v	Railways
187 (56.4 overs); Parthiv Patel 61 (82); Deepak Bansal 6/46 (16 overs)		124 (43.5 overs); Karn Sharma 48 (74); Mehul Patel 5/35 (13 overs)
437/7d (103.3 overs); Priyank Kirit Panchal 101 (138); Deepak Bansal 2/46 (16 overs)		206 (77.2 overs); Mahesh Rawat 54 (80); Ishwar Chaudhary 3/29 (15.2 overs)

Gujarat won by 294 runs
CH Bansi Lal Cricket Stadium, Rohtak
Umpires: Puttarangaiah Jayapal and Jayaraman Madanagopal
Player of the match: Rush Kalaria (Gujarat)

- Railways won the toss and elected to field.
- Karan Patel (Gujarat) made his first-class debut.

20–23 October
Scorecard

Uttar Pradesh	v	Tamil Nadu
524 (158 overs); Samarth Singh 187 (314); T. Natarajan 4/83 (33 overs)		479 (133 overs); Abhinav Mukund 154 (249); Ankit Rajpoot 4/120 (36 overs)
114/1d (49 overs); Tanmay Srivastava 59* (144); Rahil Shah 1/19 (6 overs)

Match drawn
Himachal Pradesh Cricket Association Stadium, Dharamshala
Umpires: Vineet Kulkarni and Rohan Pandit
Player of the match: Samarth Singh (Uttar Pradesh)

- Uttar Pradesh won the toss and elected to bat.
- Dhruv Pratap Singh (Uttar Pradesh) made his first-class debut.

=== Round 4 ===
27–30 October
Scorecard

Bengal	v	Railways
205 (69.5 overs); Sudip Chatterjee 85 (158); Anureet Singh 4/66 (23.5 overs)		105 (27.3 overs); Karn Sharma 40 (26); Ashok Dinda 5/45 (14 overs)
214 (75.3 overs); Manoj Tiwary 48 (71); Karan Thakur 4/45 (17.3 overs)		271 (93.2 overs); Shivakant Shukla 83 (186); Ashok Dinda 5/67 (26.2 overs)

Bengal won by 43 runs
Himachal Pradesh Cricket Association Stadium, Dharamshala
Umpires: Saiyed Khalid and Vineet Kulkarni
Player of the match: Ashok Dinda (Bengal)

- Railways won the toss and have elected to field.
- Karan Thakur (Railways) made his first-class debut.

27–30 October
Scorecard

Gujarat	v	Uttar Pradesh
347 (110.2 overs); Chirag Gandhi 87 (152); Imtiaz Ahmed 5/73 (24 overs)		241 (99.2 overs); Samarth Singh 50 (101); Hardik Patel 4/71 (27 overs)
201 (64.3 overs); Samit Gohel 50 (80); Kuldeep Yadav 6/79 (25.3 overs)		175 (76.5 overs); Tanmay Srivastava 37 (115); Hardik Patel 7/72 (31.5 overs)

Gujarat won by 132 runs
Palam A Ground, Delhi
Umpires: K. N. Ananthapadmanabhan and Sadashiv Iyer
Player of the match: Hardik Patel (Gujarat)

- Gujarat won the toss and elected to bat.
- Chintan Gaja (Gujarat) made his first-class debut.
- Hardik Patel (Gujarat) recorded his best bowling figures in a first-class match.

27–30 October
Scorecard

Baroda	v	Punjab
529 (140 overs); Deepak Hooda 293* (354); Sandeep Sharma 4/101 (34 overs)		670 (184 overs); Yuvraj Singh 260 (370); Swapnil Singh 4/169 (51 overs)
37/0 (14 overs); Kedar Devdhar 20* (44)

Match drawn
Feroz Shah Kotla, Delhi
Umpires: R. Sundar and Tapan Sharma
Player of the match: Deepak Hooda (Baroda)

- Baroda won the toss and elected to bat.
- Deepak Hooda (Baroda) scored his first double-century and his highest score in first-class cricket.
- Manan Vohra (Punjab) scored his first double-century in first-class cricket.
- Yuvraj Singh (Punjab) scored his first Ranji Trophy double-century and his highest score in first-class cricket.

27–30 October
Scorecard

Tamil Nadu	v	Madhya Pradesh
557/7d (177 overs); Kaushik Gandhi 157 (368); Ashwin Das 3/111 (31 overs)		273 (97.3 overs); Devendra Bundela 93 (190); Washington Sundar 3/23 (12 overs)
		222/5 (78 overs) (f/o); Shubham Sharma 77 (205); Aushik Srinivas 3/40 (18 overs)

Match drawn
DRIEMS Ground, Cuttack
Umpires: Anil Dandekar and Rohan Pandit
Player of the match: Narayan Jagadeesan (Tamil Nadu)

- Madhya Pradesh won the toss and elected to field.
- Ashwin Das (Madhya Pradesh) and Narayan Jagadeesan (Tamil Nadu) both made their first-class debuts.

=== Round 5 ===
5–8 November
Scorecard

Mumbai	v	Railways
345 (133.2 overs); Suryakumar Yadav 110 (270); Karn Sharma 5/81 (39 overs)		160 (70.3 overs); Karn Sharma 24 (26); Vijay Gohil 5/64 (24.3 overs)
24/0 (5 overs); Akhil Herwadkar 18* (14)		208 (92.1 overs) (f/o); Saurabh Wakaskar 39 (100); Tushar Deshpande 5/35 (16.1 overs)

Mumbai won by 10 wickets
Srikantadatta Narasimha Raja Wadeyar Ground, Mysore
Umpires: K. N. Ananthapadmanabhan and Nand Kishore
Player of the match: Akhil Herwadkar (Mumbai)

- Mumbai won the toss and elected to bat.

5–8 November
Scorecard

Baroda	v	Tamil Nadu
93 (34.3 overs); Kedar Devdhar 26 (36); Krishnamoorthy Vignesh 5/23 (12.3 overs)		337 (102.4 overs); Abhinav Mukund 100 (165); Munaf Patel 4/91 (25.4 overs)
200 (67.5 overs); Soaeb Tai 69* (60); Aushik Srinivas 4/22 (13.5 overs)

Tamil Nadu won by an innings and 44 runs
Shaheed Veer Narayan Singh International Stadium, Raipur
Umpires: Sudhir Asnani and Ulhas Gandhe
Player of the match: Krishnamoorthy Vignesh (Tamil Nadu)

- Tamil Nadu won the toss and elected to field.
- Soaeb Tai (Baroda) made his first-class debut.
- In their first innings, Baroda lost their last nine wickets for 22 runs.

5–8 November
Scorecard

Uttar Pradesh	v	Punjab
335 (102.5 overs); Kuldeep Yadav 71 (171); Sandeep Sharma 5/85 (29.5)		319 (105.4 overs); Yuvraj Singh 85 (130); Saurabh Kumar 4/71 (24.4 overs)
95 (38.5 overs); Rinku Singh 43* (93); Siddarth Kaul 6/27 (12 overs)		112/3 (28.1 overs); Jiwanjot Singh 69 (82); Saurabh Kumar 2/31 (10 overs)

Punjab won by 7 wickets
Rajiv Gandhi International Stadium, Hyderabad
Umpires: Puttarangaiah Jayapal and S. Shankar
Player of the match: Siddarth Kaul (Punjab)

- Uttar Pradesh won the toss and elected to bat.
- Rinku Singh (Uttar Pradesh) made his first-class debut.

5–8 November
Scorecard

Bengal	v	Gujarat

Match abandoned
Feroz Shah Kotla, Delhi
Umpires: Krishnamachari Bharatan and Virender Sharma

- Smog pollution prevented any play from taking place.
- The BCCI originally rescheduled the match to take place after the conclusion of the group stage. However, this decision was revoked in December 2016, with both teams being awarded one point each.

=== Round 6 ===
13–16 November
Scorecard

Baroda	v	Railways
183 (74 overs); Dhiren Mistry 50 (115); Avinash Yadav 5/50 (21 overs)		310 (91.1 overs); Saurabh Wakaskar 104 (193); Atit Sheth 4/54 (19 overs)
239 (69.5 overs); Deepak Hooda 98 (142); Avinash Yadav 3/50 (18.5 overs)		113/3 (33.0 overs); Shivakant Shukla 56* (100); Swapnil Singh 3/39 (7 overs)

Railways won by 7 wickets
Vidarbha Cricket Association Stadium, Nagpur
Umpires: Chirra Ravikanthreddy and Ravi Subramanian
Player of the match: Saurabh Wakaskar (Railways)

- Baroda won the toss and elected to bat.
- Vijay Halai (Baroda) made his first-class debut.

13–16 November
Scorecard

Gujarat	v	Madhya Pradesh
302 (113.2 overs); Manpreet Juneja 79 (153); Chandrakant Sakure 4/65 (18.2 overs)		252 (80.1 overs); Rajat Patidar 71 (152); Rush Kalaria 4/72 (23 overs)
324 (92 overs); Parthiv Patel 139* (170); Ishwar Pandey 4/69 (23 overs)		176/5 (58.0 ov); Harpreet Singh 103* (129); Rush Kalaria 3/38 (12 overs)

Match drawn
Reliance Cricket Stadium, Nagothane
Umpires: K. N. Ananthapadmanabhan and Krishnamachari Srinivasan
Player of the match: Parthiv Patel (Gujarat)

- Gujarat won the toss and elected to bat.

13–16 November
Scorecard

Bengal	v	Tamil Nadu
337 (154 overs); Sudip Chatterjee 100 (253); Krishnamoorthy Vignesh 4/70 (32 overs)		354 (109.1 overs); Dinesh Karthik 80 (117); Sayan Ghosh 5/123 (36.1 overs)
196/9 (77 overs); Shreevats Goswami 61 (154); Washington Sundar 3/29 (13 overs)

Match drawn
Madhavrao Scindia Cricket Ground, Rajkot
Umpires: Lubabalo Gcuma (SA) and Pashchim Pathak
Player of the match: Krishnamoorthy Vignesh (Tamil Nadu)

- Bengal won the toss and elected to bat.

13–16 November
Scorecard

Mumbai	v	Uttar Pradesh
233 (75.2 overs); Suryakumar Yadav 99 (153); Kuldeep Yadav 4/46 (15.2 overs)		225 (76.1 overs); Rinku Singh 70 (148); Tushar Deshpande 3/66 (25 overs)
286 (98.4 overs); Suryakumar Yadav 90 (186); Saurabh Kumar 3/48 (20.4 overs)		173 (67.2 overs); Shivam Chaudhary 50 (103); Aditya Dhumal 5/53 (20.2 overs)

Mumbai won by 121 runs
Srikantadatta Narasimha Raja Wadeyar Ground, Mysore
Umpires: Sam Nogajski (Aus) and Virender Sharma
Player of the match: Suryakumar Yadav (Mumbai)

- Mumbai won the toss and elected to bat.
- Aditya Dhumal (Mumbai) made his first-class debut.
- Umpire Virender Sharma had to stand at both ends on day 2, after the other umpire Sam Nogajski was taken ill with food poisoning.

=== Round 7 ===
21–24 November
Scorecard

Gujarat	v	Mumbai
437 (160.1 overs); Priyank Kirit Panchal 232 (434); Vishal Dabholkar 6/118 (43.1 overs)		422 (143 overs); Shreyas Iyer 194 (318); Jasprit Bumrah 6/71 (27 overs)
82/0 (45 overs); Priyank Kirit Panchal 56* (149)

Match drawn
KSCA Rajnagar Stadium, Hubballi
Umpires: Jayaraman Madanagopal and Krishnaraj Srinath
Player of the match: Jasprit Bumrah (Gujarat)

- Gujarat won the toss and elected to bat.
- Shubham Ranjane (Mumbai) made his first class debut.

21–24 November
Scorecard

Baroda	v	Bengal
97 (30.4 overs); Aditya Waghmode 17 (46); Ashok Dinda 6/45 (12.4 overs)		76 (27.3 overs); Sudip Chatterjee 37 (62); Atit Sheth 7/36 (12 overs)
133 (42 overs); Kedar Devdhar 38 (53); Mukesh Kumar 5/45 (15 overs)		133 (46 overs); Manoj Tiwary 39 (48); Babashafi Pathan 3/34 (13 overs)

Baroda won by 21 runs
CH Bansi Lal Cricket Stadium, Rohtak
Umpires: Virender Sharma and Krishnamachari Srinivasan
Player of the match: Atit Sheth (Baroda)

- Bengal won the toss and elected to field.
- Akshay Brahmbhatt (Baroda) made his first-class debut.

21–24 November
Scorecard

Punjab	v	Tamil Nadu
284 (100.2 overs); Manan Vohra 73 (111); Krishnamoorthy Vignesh 4/104 (29 overs)		354 (121.1 overs); Kaushik Gandhi 164 (350); Manpreet Gony 4/81 (25 overs)
375/5d (79.1 overs); Mandeep Singh 128 (60); Krishnamoorthy Vignesh 2/74 (17.1 overs)		103/1 (37 overs); Abhinav Mukund 67* (103); Gurkeerat Singh Mann 1/41 (13 overs)

Match drawn
Vidarbha Cricket Association Stadium, Nagpur
Umpires: Sam Nogajski (Aus) and Abhijit Deshmukh
Player of the match: Kaushik Gandhi (Tamil Nadu)

- Punjab won the toss and elected to bat.
- Laxmesha Suryaprakash (Tamil Nadu) made his first-class debut.

21–24 November
Scorecard

Railways	v	Madhya Pradesh
371 (139.3 overs); Nitin Bhille 102 (216); Ankit Sharma 6/108 (44.3 overs)		510/8d (164 overs); Devendra Bundela 188 (382); Avinash Yadav 3/106 (40 overs)
150/1 (41 overs); Saurabh Wakaskar 71* (117); Ankit Sharma 1/66 (20 overs)

Match drawn
Feroz Shah Kotla, Delhi
Umpires: P. Jayapal and Ravi Subramanian
Player of the match: Devendra Bundela (Madhya Pradesh)

- Railways won the toss and elected to bat.

=== Round 8 ===
29 November–2 December
Scorecard

Bengal	v	Mumbai
99 (35.3 overs); Sudip Chatterjee 35 (71); Shardul Thakur 6/31 (13 overs)		229 (58 overs); Kaustubh Pawar 78 (112); Ashok Dinda 5/88 (21 overs)
437 (133.3 overs); Manoj Tiwary 169 (288); Dhawal Kulkarni 5/110 (33.3 overs)		203/6 (87 overs); Shubham Ranjane 76* (193); Ashoke Dinda 4/74 (27 overs)

Match drawn
Vidarbha Cricket Association Stadium, Nagpur
Umpires: Navdeep Singh and Nitin Pandit
Player of the match: Ashoke Dinda (Bengal)

- Mumbai won the toss and elected to field.
- Abhishek Raman (Bengal) made his first-class debut.

29 November–2 December
Scorecard

Madhya Pradesh	v	Baroda
217 (67.5 Overs); Devendra Bundela 86 (120); Babashafi Pathan 5/48 (17 overs)		164 (48.1 overs); Deepak Hooda 61 (131); Ishwar Pandey 7/29 (16 overs)
293 (87.2 overs); Harpreet Singh Bhatia 73 (140); Atit Sheth 4/51 (16.3 overs)		114 (35.2 overs); Kedar Devdhar 18 (30); Chandrakant Sakure 5/17 (8.2 overs)

Madhya Pradesh won by 232 runs
Himachal Pradesh Cricket Association Stadium, Dharamshala
Umpires: K. N. Ananthapadmanabhan and Nand Kishore
Player of the match: Ishwar Pandey (Madhya Pradesh)

- Baroda won the toss and elected to field.
- Devendra Bundela made the record of highest Ranji Trophy appearances (137).

29 November–2 December
Scorecard

Gujarat	v	Punjab
624/6d (156.4 overs); Priyank Panchal 314* (460); Sandeep Sharma 3/126 (30 overs)		247 (85.2 overs); Manan Vohra 68 (146); Rush Kalaria 4/41 (15.2 overs)
		241/2 (89.0 overs) (f/o); Jiwanjot Singh 101* (261); Rush Kalaria 1/26 (10 overs)

Match drawn
KSCA Stadium, Belagavi
Umpires: Krishnamachari Bharatan and Abhijit Deshmukh
Player of the match: Priyank Panchal (Gujarat)

- Punjab won the toss and elected to field.
- Dhruv Raval (Gujarat) made his first-class debut.
- Priyank Panchal (Gujarat) scored his first triple century in first-class cricket and the 39th triple century in the Ranji Trophy. He became first player to score a triple century for Gujarat.

29 November–2 December
Scorecard

Uttar Pradesh	v	Railways
259 (70.3 overs); Suresh Raina 91 (109); Anureet Singh 4/67 (22 overs)		213 (79.4 overs); Saurabh Wakaskar 74 (174); Imtiaz Ahmed 3/34 (16 overs)
330 (90 overs); Shivam Chaudhary 124 (222); Karn Sharma 5/71 (16 overs)		155 (61.5 overs); Avinash Yadav 43 (83); Kuldeep Yadav 4/33 (12.5 overs)

Uttar Pradesh won by 221 runs
Saurashtra Cricket Association Stadium, Rajkot
Umpires: Saiyed Khalid and Sadashiv Iyer
Player of the match: Shivam Chaudhary (Uttar Pradesh)

- Railways won the toss and elected to field.
- Ashish Sehrawat (Railways) and Upendra Yadav (Uttar Pradesh) both made their first-class debuts.

=== Round 9 ===
7–10 December
Scorecard

Punjab	v	Mumbai
468 (169.5 overs); Mayank Sidhana 115 (254); Suryakumar Yadav 4/47 (19 overs)		185 (60.3 overs); Shardul Thakur 70 (80); Manpreet Gony 4/39 (14 overs)
		227/4 (116 overs) (f/o); Shreyas Iyer 123 (209); Siddharth Kaul 2/43 (17 overs)

Match drawn
Saurashtra Cricket Association Stadium, Rajkot
Umpires: Nand Kishore and P. Jayapal
Player of the match: Mayank Sidhana (Punjab)

- Punjab won the toss and elected to bat.
- Royston Dias (Mumbai) made his first-class debut.

7–10 December
Scorecard

Uttar Pradesh	v	Baroda
481 (115 overs); Kuldeep Yadav 117 (192); Sagar Mangalorkar 3/89 (25 overs)		458 (121.1 overs); Kedar Devdhar 157 (254); Imtiaz Ahmed 4/126 (36)
417/3 (104.1 overs); Shivam Chaudhary 124 (225); Rishi Arothe 1/77 (14 overs)

Match drawn
Golf Club Ground, Nasik
Umpires: Virender Sharma and Krishnamachari Srinivasan
Player of the match: Viraj Bhosale (Baroda)

- Baroda won the toss and elected to field.
- Viraj Bhosale (Baroda) made his first-class debut.

7–10 December
Scorecard

Bengal	v	Madhya Pradesh
475/9d (135 overs); Shreevats Goswami 225* (328); Puneet Datey 4/105 (28 overs)		370 (92.1 overs); Ankit Sharma 94 (142); Sayan Ghosh 5/94 (24 overs)
261/2 (72 overs); Abhishek Raman 91 (186); Puneet Datey 1/26 (10 overs)

Match drawn
Palam A Ground, Model Sports Complex, Delhi
Umpires: Saiyed Khalid and Rohan Pandit
Player of the match: Shreevats Goswami (Bengal)

- Bengal won the toss and elected to bat.

7–10 December
Scorecard

Gujarat	v	Tamil Nadu
307 (112 overs); Priyank Panchal 113 (180); Baba Aparajith 3/31 (18 overs)		580/6d (229 overs); Kaushik Gandhi 202 (538); Rush Kalaria 2/47 (20 overs)

Match drawn
KSCA Stadium, Belagavi
Umpires: Abhijit Deshmukh and Navdeep Singh
Player of the match: Priyank Panchal (Gujarat)

- Gujarat won the toss and elected to bat.
- Priyank Panchal became the first player for Gujarat to score 1,000 runs in a single Ranji Trophy season.

== See also ==
- 2016–17 Ranji Trophy
- 2016–17 Ranji Trophy Group B
- 2016–17 Ranji Trophy Group C
