= 2017–18 Ranji Trophy Group C =

Cricket tournament

2017-18 Ranji Trophy Group C
- The Ranji Trophy, awarded to the winners
- Dates: 6 October 2017 – 28 November 2017
- Administrator(s): BCCI
- Cricket format: First-class cricket
- Tournament format(s): Round-robin
- Host(s): India
- Participants: 7

The 2017–18 Ranji Trophy was the 84th season of the Ranji Trophy, the first-class cricket tournament in India. It was contested by 28 teams divided into four groups, each containing seven teams. The top two teams from Group C progressed to the quarterfinals of the competition.

Ahead of the fifth round of fixtures, Tamil Nadu's last two home games were moved from Chennai following heavy rain and were rescheduled to take place in Indore and Vadodara. In November 2017, Mumbai's fifth-round fixture against Baroda was their 500th match in the Ranji Trophy. Mumbai progressed to the knockout stage of the competition after beating Tripura by 10 wickets in round 7 of the tournament. They were joined by Madhya Pradesh, who topped the group, after beating Odisha by 7 wickets in their final game.

== Teams ==
The following teams were placed in Group C, based on their average points in the previous three years:

- Andhra Pradesh
- Baroda
- Madhya Pradesh
- Mumbai
- Odisha
- Tamil Nadu
- Tripura

== Points table ==
Team	Pld	W	L	D	A	Pts	NRR
Madhya Pradesh	6	3	1	2	0	21	–0.116
Mumbai	6	2	0	4	0	21	+0.228
Andhra	6	1	0	5	0	19	+0.326
Baroda	6	1	1	4	0	16	+0.508
Tamil Nadu	6	0	1	5	0	11	–0.112
Odisha	6	0	2	4	0	6	–0.648
Tripura	6	0	2	4	0	4	–0.426

- Top two teams advanced to the knockout stage

== Fixtures ==
=== Round 1 ===
6–9 October 2017
Scorecard

Tripura	v	Odisha
194/8d (68 overs); Udiyan Bose 104 (151); Dhiraj Singh 5/55 (18 overs)		18/1 (5 overs); Govinda Poddar 8* (13); Manisankar Murasingh 1/4 (2 overs)

Match drawn
Vikas Cricket Ground, Cuttack
Umpires: Ulhas Gandhe and Tapan Sharma
Player of the match: Udiyan Bose (Tripura)

- Odisha won the toss and elected to field.
- No play was possible on days 1 and 2 and only 2 overs were bowled on day 3.

6–9 October 2017
Scorecard

Madhya Pradesh	v	Baroda
551/8d (164 overs); Shubham Sharma 196 (394); Swapnil Singh 3/136 (39 overs)		302 (79 overs); Yusuf Pathan 111 (125); Ishwar Pandey 2/44 (19 overs)
73/2 (16 overs); Harpreet Singh 44* (48); Atit Sheth 2/19 (5 overs)		318 (76.3 over) (f/o); Yusuf Pathan 136* (154); Ishwar Pandey 5/40 (18 overs)

Madhya Pradesh won by 8 wickets
Holkar Stadium, Indore
Umpires: Jayaraman Madanagopal and Krishnamachari Srinivasan
Player of the match: Shubham Sharma (Madhya Pradesh)

- Baroda won the toss and elected to field.
- Waseem Ahmed (Madhya Pradesh) and Lukman Meriwala (Baroda) both made their first-class debuts.

6–9 October 2017
Scorecard

Tamil Nadu	v	Andhra
176 (85 overs); Baba Aparajith 51 (137); Bhargav Bhatt 4/52 (30 overs)		309 (123.4 overs); Bodapati Sumanth 109 (280); Ravichandran Ashwin 4/71 (33.4 overs)
350/6d (105 overs); Baba Aparajith 108* (212); Prithvi Raj 3/61 (20 overs)		198/7 (41.4 overs); Srikar Bharat 64 (86); Krishnamoorthy Vignesh 3/34 (7.4 overs)

Match drawn
MA Chidambaram Stadium, Chennai
Umpires: Abhijit Deshmukh and Umesh Dubey
Player of the match: Bodapati Sumanth (Andhra)

- Tamil Nadu won the toss and elected to bat.
- Shoaib Md Khan and Prithvi Raj (Andhra) both made their first-class debuts.

=== Round 2 ===
14–17 October 2017
Scorecard

Madhya Pradesh	v	Mumbai
409 (144.3 overs); Naman Ojha 180 (410); Akash Parkar 4/70 (26 overs)		440 (141.4 overs); Jay Bista 135 (140); Shubham Sharma 2/8 (6.4 overs)
145/6 (59 overs); Ankit Sharma 52* (88); Vijay Gohil 2/30 (17 overs)

Match drawn
Emerald High School Ground, Indore
Umpires: Sivasubramaniyan Shankar and R. Sundar
Player of the match: Jay Bista (Mumbai)

- Madhya Pradesh won the toss and elected to bat.
- Minad Manjrekar and Akash Parkar (Mumbai) both made their first-class debuts.

14–17 October 2017
Scorecard

Tripura	v	Tamil Nadu
258 (96.1 overs); Smit Patel 99 (177); Krishnamoorthy Vignesh 4/41 (23 overs)		357/4d (88 overs); Washington Sundar 159 (231); Abhijit Sarkar 2/43 (10 overs)
91/3 (34 overs); Smit Patel 35* (84); Rahil Shah 2/30 (12 overs)

Match drawn
MA Chidambaram Stadium, Chennai
Umpires: Ulhas Gandhe and Vineet Kulkarni
Player of the match: Washington Sundar (Tamil Nadu)

- Tamil Nadu won the toss and elected to field.
- Ravisrinivasan Sai Kishore (Tamil Nadu) and Joydeep Bhattacharjee (Tripura) both made their first-class debuts.
- Washington Sundar (Tamil Nadu) scored his maiden first-class century.

14–17 October 2017
Scorecard

Baroda	v	Andhra
373 (128 overs); Kedar Devdhar 93 (192); Bandaru Ayyappa 4/69 (32 overs)		554 (148.5 overs); Hanuma Vihari 150 (284); Atit Sheth 5/91 (29 overs)
195/6 (71.4 overs); Vishnu Solanki 68 (129); Ashwin Hebbar 2/16 (10 overs)

Match drawn
Reliance Stadium, Vadodara
Umpires: Kamlesh Sharma and Virender Sharma
Player of the match: Hanuma Vihari (Andhra)

- Andhra won the toss and elected to field.

=== Round 3 ===
24–27 October 2017
Scorecard

Mumbai	v	Tamil Nadu
374 (103.1 overs); Prithvi Shaw 123 (155); Vijay Shankar 4/52 (14 overs)		450 (142 overs); Baba Indrajith 152 (247); Vijay Gohil 4/129 (43 overs)
371/5d (95 overs); Shreyas Iyer 138 (124); Rahil Shah 2/86 (21 overs)

Match drawn
Bandra Kurla Complex Ground, Mumbai
Umpires: Martin Saggers and Virender Sharma
Player of the match: Baba Indrajith (Tamil Nadu)

- Mumbai won the toss and elected to bat.

24–27 October 2017
Scorecard

Tripura	v	Madhya Pradesh
205 (64.2 overs); Bishal Ghosh 65 (166); Ishwar Pandey 3/40 (15 overs)		260 (80.1 overs); Harpreet Singh 70 (123); Gurinder Singh 4/94 (26.1 overs)
103 (44 overs); Rajesh Banik 29 (55); Mihir Hirwani 5/22 (14 overs)		52/0 (14.2 overs); Harpreet Singh 25* (33)

Madhya Pradesh won by 10 wickets
Maharaja Bir Bikram College Stadium, Agartala
Umpires: Puttarangaiah Jayapal and Chirra Ravikanthreddy
Player of the match: Harpreet Singh (Mumbai)

- Tripura won the toss and elected to bat.

24–27 October 2017
Scorecard

Andhra	v	Odisha
584/5d (166 overs); Hanuma Vihari 302* (456); Suryakant Pradhan 2/106 (31 overs)		391 (139.3 overs); Govinda Poddar 111 (182); Bhargav Bhatt 4/77 (53 overs)
		152/7 (55 overs) (f/o); Biplab Samantray 62* (112); Bhargav Bhatt 4/40 (25 overs)

Match drawn
Dr PVG Raju ACA Sports Complex, Vizianagaram
Umpires: Sanjeev Dua and Nikhil Patwardhan
Player of the match: Hanuma Vihari (Andhra)

- Andhra won the toss and elected to bat.
- Subham Nayak (Odisha) made his first-class debut.
- Hanuma Vihari (Andhra) scored his maiden triple century and his second consecutive total of 150 runs or more in first-class cricket.

=== Round 4 ===
1–4 November 2017
Scorecard

Mumbai	v	Odisha
289 (99.5 overs); Prithvi Shaw 105 (153); Basant Mohanty 4/51 (27.5 overs)		145 (50.5 overs); Biplab Samantray 72* (129); Vijay Gohil 3/26 (10 overs)
268/9d (71 overs); Siddhesh Lad 117 (153); Suryakant Pradhan 3/106 (19 overs)		292 (85.1 overs); Govinda Poddar 87 (123); Akash Parkar 3/40 (14 overs)

Mumbai won by 120 runs
KIIT Stadium, Bhubaneswar
Umpires: K. N. Ananthapadmanabhan and Krishnamachari Srinivasan
Player of the match: Prithvi Shaw (Mumbai)

- Odisha won the toss and elected to field.
- Shantanu Mishra (Odisha) made his first-class debut.
- Prithvi Shaw (Mumbai) scored his second consecutive century, and his fourth in five first-class matches since his debut.

1–4 November 2017
Scorecard

Baroda	v	Tripura
521 (152.5 overs); Vishnu Solanki 116 (216); Ajoy Sarkar 3/88 (26.2 overs)		436 (156.3 overs); Smit Patel 158 (235); Rudresh Vaghela 2/62 (15.3 overs)
85/6 (35 overs); Vishnu Solanki 24 (42); Abhijit Sarkar 5/18 (11 overs)

Match drawn
Reliance Stadium, Vadodara
Umpires: Nand Kishore and Nikhil Patwardhan
Player of the match: Atit Sheth (Baroda)

- Tripura won the toss and elected to field.
- Mitesh Patel and Rudresh Vaghela (Baroda) both made their first-class debuts.
- Vishnu Solanki (Baroda) scored his maiden century in first-class cricket.

1–4 November 2017
Scorecard

Madhya Pradesh	v	Andhra
321 (122.5 overs); Harpreet Singh 88 (153); Prithvi Raj 4/56 (19 overs)		376 (115.2 overs); Hanuma Vihari 77 (132); Mihir Hirwani 2/56 (18 overs)
119 (51.1 overs); Devendra Bundela 38 (104); Bandaru Ayyappa 5/34 (17 overs)		65/2 (13.1 overs); Hanuma Vihari 28* (27); Puneet Datey 1/21 (6.1 overs)

Andhra won by 8 wickets
Dr PVG Raju ACA Sports Complex, Vizianagaram
Umpires: Navdeep Singh and Virender Sharma
Player of the match: Bandaru Ayyappa (Andhra)

- Andhra won the toss and elected to field.

=== Round 5 ===
9–12 November 2017
Scorecard

Mumbai	v	Baroda
171 (56.2 overs); Aditya Tare 50 (82); Atit Sheth 5/50 (19 overs)		575/9d (180 overs); Swapnil Singh 164 (309); Shardul Thakur 3/95 (37 overs)
260/7 (120.4 overs); Prithvi Shaw 56 (70); Kartik Kakade 2/50 (24 overs)

Match drawn
Wankhede Stadium, Mumbai
Umpires: Abhijit Deshmukh and Puttarangaiah Jayapal
Player of the match: Swapnil Singh (Baroda)

- Baroda won the toss and elected to field.
- This was Mumbai's 500th match in the Ranji Trophy.
- Ahmadnoor Pathan and Kartik Kakade (Baroda) both made their first-class debuts.

9–12 November 2017
Scorecard

Andhra	v	Tripura
402 (144 overs); Prasanth Kumar 133 (322); Abhijit Sarkar 5/68 (25 overs)		315 (99.4 overs); Manisankar Murasingh 81 (89); Bhargav Bhatt 4/93 (28 overs)
234/4d (46 overs); K. S. Bharat 50 (79); Rana Dutta 3/43 (13 overs)		272/5 (56 overs); Smit Patel 107* (99); Bhargav Bhatt 2/83 (16 overs)

Match drawn
Maharaja Bir Bikram College Stadium, Agartala
Umpires: Sanjeev Dua and Tapan Sharma
Player of the match: Smit Patel (Tripura)

- Tripura won the toss and elected to field.

9–12 November 2017
Scorecard

Tamil Nadu	v	Odisha
530/8d (165 overs); Murali Vijay 140 (273); Suryakant Pradhan 3/75 (25 overs)		533/9 (187.1 overs); Rajesh Dhuper 97 (225); Washington Sundar 4/95 (35.1 overs)

Match drawn
DRIEMS Ground, Cuttack
Umpires: Rohan Pandit and Nikhil Patwardhan
Player of the match: Rajesh Dhuper (Odisha)

- Tamil Nadu won the toss and elected to bat.
- Velidi Lakshman (Tamil Nadu) made his first-class debut.

=== Round 6 ===
17–20 November 2017
Scorecard

Mumbai	v	Andhra
332 (132 overs); Prithvi Shaw 114 (173); Bandaru Ayyappa 4/110 (40 overs)		215 (77 overs); Hanuma Vihari 70 (154); Shardul Thakur 5/55 (23 overs)
279/6d (57 overs); Shreyas Iyer 89 (114); Paidikalva Vijaykumar 2/63 (19 overs)		219/5 (81 overs); Srikar Bharat 68 (162); Karsh Kothari 3/55 (32 overs)

Match drawn
CSR Sharma College Ground, Ongole
Umpires: Ulhas Gandhe and Amiesh Saheba
Player of the match: Prithvi Shaw (Mumbai)

- Andhra won the toss and elected to field.
- Karsh Kothari (Mumbai) made his first-class debut.

17–20 November 2017
Scorecard

Madhya Pradesh	v	Tamil Nadu
264 (90.1 overs); Ankit Sharma 77 (174); Krishnamoorthy Vignesh 4/32 (24 overs)		326 (105.4 overs); Yo Mahesh 103* (214); Puneet Datey 3/55 (24 overs)
351/4d (102.5 overs); Harpreet Singh 100* (139); Krishnamoorthy Vignesh 3/42 (17 overs)		79/1 (25 overs); Abhinav Mukund 32* (46); Ishwar Pandey 1/15 (6 overs)

Match drawn
Holkar Stadium, Indore
Umpires: Abhijit Deshmukh and Rohan Pandit

- Tamil Nadu won the toss and elected to field.

17–20 November 2017
Scorecard

Baroda	v	Odisha
503 (137.4 overs); Ninad Rathva 115 (102); Basant Mohanty 5/85 (32 overs)		445 (166 overs); Subhranshu Senapati 173 (395); Swapnil Singh 5/50 (31 overs)
259/1 (43.5 overs); Aditya Waghmode 101* (114); Dhiraj Singh 1/85 (15 overs)

Match drawn
Reliance Stadium, Vadodara
Umpires: Nitin Pandit and Sivasubramaniyan Shankar
Player of the match: Subhranshu Senapati (Odisha)

- Odisha won the toss and elected to field.
- Ninad Rathva and Dhruv Patel (Baroda) both made their first-class debuts.

=== Round 7 ===
25–28 November 2017
Scorecard

Tripura	v	Mumbai
195 (60.4 overs); Manisankar Murasingh 43 (62); Akash Parkar 5/32 (16 overs)		421/8d (111 overs); Jay Bista 123 (136); Manisankar Murasingh 5/71 (29 overs)
288 (78 overs); Yashpal Singh 82 (117); Dhawal Kulkarni 4/69 (17 overs)		64/0 (6.2 overs); Prithvi Shaw 50* (26)

Mumbai won by 10 wickets
Wankhede Stadium, Mumbai
Umpires: Yeshwant Barde and Nand Kishore
Player of the match: Jay Bista (Mumbai)

- Mumbai won the toss and elected to field.

25–28 November 2017
Scorecard

Baroda	v	Tamil Nadu
309 (98.1 overs); Swapnil Singh 144 (266); Krishnamoorthy Vignesh 3/52 (21 overs)		274 (95.3 overs); Baba Aparajith 59 (142); Lukman Meriwala 3/37 (18 overs)
197 (57.5 overs); Swapnil Singh 49 (91); M. Mohammed 3/22 (7 overs)		130 (65.1 overs); Baba Aparajith 60 (175); Swapnil Singh 4/21 (19.1 overs)

Baroda won by 102 runs
MA Chidambaram Stadium, Chennai
Umpires: Gerard Abood and Tapan Sharma
Player of the match: Swapnil Singh (Baroda)

- Baroda won the toss and elected to bat.

25–28 November 2017
Scorecard

Odisha	v	Madhya Pradesh
147 (52.2 overs); Shantanu Mishra 60 (100); Chandrakant Sakure 4/42 (14.3 overs)		388 (115 overs); Rajat Patidar 123 (199); Govinda Poddar 7/102 (27 overs)
350 (138.2 overs); Subhranshu Senapati 125 (259); Mihir Hirwani 5/97 (37 overs)		111/3 (37 overs); Devendra Bundela 50* (109); Deepak Behera 2/31 (11 overs)

Madhya Pradesh won by 7 wickets
Holkar Stadium, Indore
Umpires: Saiyed Khalid and Sadashiv Iyer
Player of the match: Puneet Datey (Madhya Pradesh)

- Madhya Pradesh won the toss and elected to field.
- Aryaman Birla (Madhya Pradesh) made his first-class debut.
