= 2016–17 Irani Cup =

Gujarat	Rest of India
358 & 246	226 & 379/4
102.5 & 90.3	75 & 103.1
- Rest of India won by 6 wickets
- Date: 20 January 2017 – 24 January 2017
- Venue: Brabourne Stadium, Mumbai
- Player of the match: Wriddhiman Saha (ROI)
- Umpires: Abhijit Deshmukh and Virender Sharma

The 2016–17 Irani Cup was the 55th season of the Irani Cup, a first-class cricket competition in India. It was played as a one-off match from 20 January to 24 January 2017 between Gujarat (the winners of 2016–17 Ranji Trophy) and the Rest of India team. Cheteshwar Pujara was captain of the Rest of India team. The match was held at Brabourne Stadium, Mumbai.

== Squads ==
Gujarat	Rest of India
Playing XI
Parthiv Patel (c, wk)	Abhinav Mukund
Manpreet Juneja	Akhil Herwadkar
Mohit Thadani	Cheteshwar Pujara (c)
Chirag Gandhi	Karun Nair
Dhruv Raval	Manoj Tiwary
Priyank Panchal	Wriddhiman Saha (wk)
Hardik Patel	Kuldeep Yadav
Ishwar Chaudhary	Shahbaz Nadeem
Chintan Gaja	Pankaj Singh
Karan Patel	Mohammed Siraj
Samit Gohel	Siddarth Kaul
Reserve Bench
Rush Kalaria	Shardul Thakur
Het Patel	Akshay Wakhare
RP Singh	Ishan Kishan (wk)
Rujul Bhatt	Prashant Chopra
	Krishnamoorthy Vignesh

== Match ==
20–24 January
Scorecard

Gujarat	v	Rest of India
358 (102.5 overs); Chirag Gandhi 169 (202); Siddarth Kaul 5/86 (26 overs)		226 (75 overs); Cheteshwar Pujara 86 (156); Chintan Gaja 4/60 (19 Overs)
246 (90.3 overs); Priyank Panchal 73 (135); Shahbaz Nadeem 4/64 (29 overs)		379/4 (103.1 overs); Wriddhiman Saha 203* (272); Hardik Patel 2/104 (36.1 overs)

Rest of India won by 6 wickets
Brabourne Stadium, Mumbai
Umpires: Abhijit Deshmukh and Virender Sharma
Player of the match: Wriddhiman Saha (ROI)

- Gujarat won the toss and elected to bat
- Mohit Thadani (Guj) made his first-class debut.
- Chirag Gandhi (Guj) and Wriddhiman Saha (ROI) scored their maiden first-class centuries.

== Summary ==
Gujarat entered the Irani Cup as winners of the 2016–17 Ranji Trophy, their first Ranji title, and second appearance in the finals after 65 years. The Rest of India side included the best performing players from 27 other teams of the Ranji Trophy and a few having played in the senior national team. Overall the match turns up to be an audition for all players for the upcoming five test matches.

Day 1: Gujarat 300 for 8 (Gandhi 136*, Juneja 47, Kaul 4-73) v Rest of India

Gujarat won the toss and elected to bat. But Gujarat saw a collapse in the top order as Pankaj Singh and Siddarth Kaul packed off the top three run getters of 2016–17 Ranji Trophy in the first session. Pankaj hassled Samit Gohel in the first over of the match with a scrambled sequence of inswingers and outswingers. Priyank Panchal, the highest run-scorer in the Ranji Trophy, and Dhruv Raval (39) restored calm with some positive strokes during the course of their 55-run partnership. It took a fine delivery from Pankaj to dislodge Panchal - the ball pitched on middle and off and seamed away and the outside edge was caught by Karun Nair at first slip. In the penultimate over before lunch, Parthiv attempted to punch Kaul off the back foot, but the ball was closer to his body than he anticipated and the resultant inside-edge found the stumps. In the first over of the second session, Raval, who had played a few attacking shots in the morning, dangled his bat at an away-going delivery from Kaul and was caught behind. Things looked dire for Gujarat at 82 for 4, but Juneja and Gandhi stood strong to post a partnership. The run-rate, too, trickled past three as they completed their 50-run partnership in 67 balls. But Gujarat lost momentum once again, as Pujara introduced part-time offspinner Akhil Herwadkar to bowl the last over before tea, and he struck with his second delivery. Juneja went back to a short ball and punched uppishly off the backfoot but picked out Pujara at short cover. Rest of India made a few fielding lapses in the final session, as Kaul and Karun dropped straightforward chances offered by Karan Patel and Mohit Thadani respectively. Kaul, who hurt his ring finger on his right hand while attempting the catch and went off the field, returned to make amends by dismissing Thadani. Gandhi eventually got to his hundred off 125 balls in the company of the tail. An over earlier, though, Chintan Gaja was caught off a deflection off the keeper's pads and held by Manoj Tiwary at first slip, but umpire Virender Sharma turned it down. Pankaj returned to have Gaja trapped in front.

Day 2: Rest of India 206 for 9 (Pujara 86, Gaja 3/46, Hardik Patel 3/73) trail Gujarat 358 (Gandhi 169, Kaul 5/86, Pankaj 4/104) by 152 runs

Gandhi realised grafting wasn't a sustainable strategy with only two wickets left and took his chances with some adventurous strokes. When he smashed Kuldeep for a straight six, he had scored exactly 50 percent of Gujarat's total at that point - 328. Kaul removed Gandhi to claim his ninth five-for in first-class cricket. Seeing Gandhi walk out of the crease, Kaul pitched it short, and the batsman, trying to work it off his hips, top-edged it back to Kaul. His partnership with a resolute Hardik yielded 72 runs. Due to some poor catching from Rest of India, the last-wicket stand lasted for longer than it should have. First, Abhinav dropped Ishwar Chaudhary at third slip, and in the next over, Nadeem put down an even simpler chance at gully offered by Hardik. Chaudhary swung his bat around for a few raspy hits before a Rest of India fielder - Manoj Tiwary - finally held on to a catch. Gujarat was able to post a first inning score of 358 runs.

Gujarat's fielding played a starring role, especially in the dismissals of openers Abhinav Mukund and Akhil Herwadkar. In the ninth over, Abhinav saw there was only a wide slip and a gully, and attempted to steer the ball between them. But, Samit Gohel, at slip, dived to his left to pluck a fine one-handed catch. Herwadkar began a touch nervously and hit a few drives uppishly, but with Pujara batting confidently, he settled down and played a few eye-catching cover drives, often opening the face late to find the gaps. However, he was out against the run of play. Herwadkar went back to Hardik and worked him through the leg side, but Rawal at short leg, with eyes on the ball and low hands, made a tough catch look effortless. For most of the second session, seamers Chintan Gaja, Ishwar Chaudhary and debutant Mohit Thadani bowled with two point fielders to Pujara, and tried to provoke him into playing a loose stroke outside off. Pujara, though, was happy leaving deliveries. Chaudhary troubled Karun early on with a sequence of in-dippers. Karun's first few runs came off inside-edges to the leg side; he briefly looked comfortable when he struck two cover drives for fours off successive deliveries from Hardik. Gaja, though, reaped the rewards of Chaudhary's probing spell and removed Karun in the penultimate over before tea. Karun played away from his body, but the ball shaped in slightly and caught the inside edge, to be snared by Parthiv. Since his unbeaten triple hundred in Chennai, Karun has now only managed scores of 14, 12 and 28 in first-class cricket. From overs 20 to 36 in the post-lunch session, Rest of India, mainly to Pujara's enterprise, scored 70 runs. Pujara steered, dabbed and late cut the bowlers when they kept it outside off, and tucked it around for singles when they veered straighter. Parthiv spotted this and asked his seamers to bowl to the stumps with the cushion of a four-man leg-side field, especially loaded in front of square. Thadani was the biggest beneficiary, as he pinged Manoj Tiwary (12) and Wriddhiman Saha (0) in front in the space of four overs. Rest of India managed only 40 runs from the 36th to the 50th overs. Soon, Hardik trapped Kuldeep Yadav lbw after the batsman, initially shaping for the sweep before changing his mind, failed to get his bat down in time. In the next over, Pujara's resistance came to an end when he was caught down the leg side attempting a pull. Shahbaz Nadeem and Siddarth Kaul didn't last long, but Pankaj Singh and Mohammed Siraj ensured Gujarat wouldn't bat again until tomorrow at least. Gujarat's unrelenting discipline with the ball was only matched by Rest of India's flaccid batting, as they slumped to 206 for 9 on a largely good batting surface at the Brabourne Stadium. Except for a typically sturdy 86 from captain Cheteshwar Pujara, there were few contributions of substance from a powerful batting line-up, as Rest of India fell from 136 for 2 to 192 for 9.

Day 3: Gujarat 358 and 227 for 8 (Panchal 73, Gandhi 55*, Nadeem 4/53) lead Rest of India 226 (Pujara 86, Gaja 4/60) by 359 runs

Pankaj and Siraj lasted just three overs with the bat and added another 20 runs for Rest of India on the beginning of the third day. Pankaj struck in the third over to dismiss Samit Gohel for the second time in the match. Pankaj first beat Gohel with one that landed on the shorter side of good length and seamed away. The next delivery was fuller and Gohel, sucked into the drive, edged it to Abhinav Mukund at third slip. Siraj induced an edge off Rawal, but Karun Nair, who dropped Thadani in the first innings, put down another simple chance. Siraj eventually had him off the last ball of the 25th over after he went over the stumps and had Rawal driving. This time Manoj Tiwary, Rest of India's best slip fielder in this game, moved to his right to pocket his 100th catch in first-class cricket. Panchal and Parthiv ensured the run-rate improved after lunch - they scored 49 in the first 10 overs after lunch. Their dismissals, though, gave Rest of India a realistic chance of keeping their eventual target under 400. Gujarat's early solidity was courtesy Priyank Panchal, who overcame a slow start. He completed his 10th 50-plus score in as many matches, and along with first Dhruv Rawal and then Parthiv, appeared to be nudging his team towards a big lead. However, his attempted pull off Siddharth Kaul was caught down the leg side by Wriddhiman Saha, who had to dive low to his left. Nadeem's first wicket came under controversial circumstances when Gujarat captain Parthiv Patel (32) was adjudged caught at short leg by umpire Virender Sharma despite the ball being nowhere close to either his bat or glove. Parthiv was five short of 10,000 first-class runs at that point. Gujarat's momentum wasn't altogether lost was due to Gandhi, who batted with three stitches on his hand after sustaining an injury during catching practice before start of play. He came in at the fall of Parthiv's wicket and showed few signs of discomfort despite the succession of wickets. Manprit Juneja, who shared a 109-run stand with Gandhi in the first innings, fell inside four overs of Parthiv's dismissal. Mohammed Siraj, the Hyderabad seamer, who was impressive all day, had Juneja hanging his bat at one outside off stump and Saha completed a simple catch. With Karan Patel for company, Gandhi reprised his flamboyant boundaries from the first innings: he charged at Pankaj Singh and hit him over cover and then slashed one uppishly over gully in the same over. Nadeem tempted him by dangling the ball generously, but Gandhi either blocked or left several deliveries while playing the percentages with the sweep or the cut. Gujarat slumped from 126 for 2 to 184 for 6 as Nadeem worked around Gandhi by first bowling Karan and then removing Thadani and Chintan Gaja in the space of four overs. Gujarat's hopes of pushing the lead past 400 rest on Gandhi and Hardik Patel, who put on 72 for the ninth wicket in the first innings.

Umpiring controversies: Third day of the match came in with controversy surrounding two umpiring decisions made by Virender Sharma during Gujarat's second innings. First, in the 48th over, Gujarat captain Parthiv Patel was adjudged caught at short leg - a fine, diving effort from Akhil Herwadkar - after the ball lobbed off his pads, with his bat and gloves nowhere near the ball. The other contentious decision came when Anil Thadani was adjudged caught at slip off left-arm spinner Shahbaz Nadeem in the final session. Nadeem's delivery appeared to hit Thadani's pads on the half volley before deflecting to Manoj Tiwary at first slip. The initial assumption among everyone, including the television commentators, was there was no bat involved, and that Thadani was rightly adjudged lbw. However, it was later confirmed that umpire Sharma had given him out caught. The commentators now discussed the possibility of an under edge, but the batsman would have been not out in that case, as the ball bounced after passing the bat. Sharma was even surrounded in such controversy, when he was accused to be biased towards the home team in 2015–16 Ranji Trophy in a match between Karnataka and Vidarbha.

== Scorecard ==
=== Innings 1 ===
Gujarat 1st innings
Player	Status	Runs	Balls	4s	6s	SR
Samit Gohel	lbw b Pankaj Singh	0	6	0	0	0.00
Priyank Panchal	c Nair b Pankaj Singh	30	61	6	0	49.18
Dhruv Raval	c †Saha b Kaul	39	94	4	0	41.48
Parthiv Patel (c, wk)	b Kaul	11	30	1	0	36.66
Manpreet Juneja	c Pujara b Herwadkar	47	90	7	0	52.22
Chirag Gandhi	c & b Kaul	169	202	22	2	83.66
Karan Patel	c †Saha b Kaul	13	28	2	0	46.42
Mohit Thadani	c Tiwary b Kaul	4	11	1	0	36.36
Chintan Gaja	lbw b Pankaj Singh	8	30	1	0	26.66
Hardik Patel	not out	18	50	3	0	36.00
Ishwar Chaudhary	c Tiwary b Pankaj Singh	15	15	2	1	100.00
Extras	(lb 2, w 2)	4				
Total	(all out; 102.5 overs)	358	(3.48 runs per over)			

Fall of wickets 1-0 (Gohel, 0.6 ov), 2-55 (Panchal, 20.3 ov), 3-81 (PA Patel, 30.3 ov), 4-82 (Raval, 32.3 ov), 5-191 (Juneja, 60.2 ov), 6-231 (KP Patel, 68.5 ov), 7-237 (Thadani, 72.4 ov), 8-261 (Gaja, 80.4 ov), 9-333 (Gandhi, 97.3 ov), 10-358 (Chaudhary, 102.5 ov)

Rest of India Bowling
Bowler	O	M	R	W	Econ	Extras
Pankaj Singh	22.5	5	104	4	4.55	(2w)
Siddarth Kaul	26	4	86	5	3.30	
Mohammed Siraj	16	5	49	0	3.06	
Kuldeep Yadav	16	3	61	0	3.81	
Shahbaz Nadeem	19	2	43	0	2.26	
Akhil Herwadkar	3	0	13	1	4.33	

=== Innings 2 ===
Rest of India 1st innings
Player	Status	Runs	Balls	4s	6s	SR
Akhil Herwadkar	c Raval b HP Patel	48	82	7	1	58.53
Abhinav Mukund	c Gohel b Gaja	8	25	1	0	32.00
Cheteshwar Pujara (c)	c †PA Patel b Chaudhary	86	156	11	0	55.12
Karun Nair	c †PA Patel b Gaja	28	45	3	0	62.22
Manoj Tiwary	lbw b Thadani	12	35	2	0	34.28
Wriddhiman Saha (wk)	lbw b Thadani	0	11	0	0	0.00
Kuldeep Yadav	lbw b HP Patel	5	19	1	0	26.31
Shahbaz Nadeem	c Gaja b HP Patel	0	8	0	0	0.00
Siddarth Kaul	c †PA Patel b Gaja	0	16	0	0	0.00
Pankaj Singh	not out	9	22	0	0	40.90
Mohammed Siraj	c Juneja b Gaja	26	31	3	0	83.87
Extras	(b 4)	4				
Total	(all out; 75 overs; 329 mins)	226	(3.01 runs per over)			

Fall of wickets 1-21 (Mukund, 8.6 ov), 2-89 (Herwadkar, 25.5 ov), 3-136 (Nair, 38.6 ov), 4-166 (Tiwary, 50.6 ov), 5-170 (Saha, 54.5 ov), 6-191 (Kuldeep Yadav, 61.6 ov), 7-191 (Pujara, 62.1 ov), 8-191 (Nadeem, 65.2 ov), 9-192 (Kaul, 66.6 ov), 10-226 (Mohammed Siraj, 74.6 ov)

Bowling	O	M	R	W	Econ
Chintan Gaja	19	4	60	4	3.15
Mohit Thadani	15	3	48	2	3.20
Ishwar Chaudhary	14	5	28	1	2.00
Hardik Patel	26	5	79	3	3.03
Karan Patel	1	0	7	0	7.00

=== Innings 3 ===
Gujarat 2nd innings
Player	Status	Runs	Balls	4s	6s	SR
Samit Gohel	c Mukund b Pankaj Singh	1	13	0	0	7.69
Priyank Panchal	c †Saha b Kaul	73	135	9	0	54.07
Dhruv Raval	c Tiwary b Mohammed Siraj	23	64	4	0	35.93
Parthiv Patel (c, wk)	c Herwadkar b Nadeem	32	53	3	0	60.37
Manpreet Juneja	c †Saha b Mohammed Siraj	12	32	2	0	37.50
Chirag Gandhi	c Pujara b Kaul	70	147	8	0	47.61
Karan Patel	b Nadeem	15	27	2	0	55.55
Mohit Thadani	c Tiwary b Nadeem	11	31	2	0	35.48
Chintan Gaja	b Nadeem	2	11	0	0	18.18
Hardik Patel	b Kaul	0	30	0	0	0.00
Ishwar Chaudhary	not out	0	0	0	0	-
Extras	(b 4, lb 3)	7				
Total	(all out; 90.3 overs)	246	(2.71 runs per over)			

Fall of wickets 1-4 (Gohel, 2.6 ov), 2-42 (Raval, 24.5 ov), 3-127 (Panchal, 42.1 ov), 4-133 (PA Patel, 47.2 ov), 5-147 (Juneja, 50.5 ov), 6-184 (KP Patel, 61.3 ov), 7-212 (Thadani, 69.6 ov), 8-220 (Gaja, 73.5 ov), 9-241 (HP Patel, 88.6 ov), 10-246 (Gandhi, 90.3 ov)

Bowling	O	M	R	W	Econ
Pankaj Singh	18	4	43	1	2.38
Siddarth Kaul	23.3	6	70	3	2.97
Mohammed Siraj	15	4	39	2	2.60
Shahbaz Nadeem	29	5	64	4	2.20
Kuldeep Yadav	5	0	23	0	4.60

=== Innings 4 ===
Rest of India 2nd innings
Player	Status	Runs	Balls	4s	6s	SR
Akhil Herwadkar	c Panchal b KP Patel	20	40	3	1	50.00
Abhinav Mukund	c Raval b HP Patel	19	43	2	0	44.18
Cheteshwar Pujara (c)	not out	116	238	16	0	48.73
Karun Nair	b HP Patel	7	10	1	0	70.00
Manoj Tiwary	c †PA Patel b Thadani	7	16	1	0	43.75
Wriddhiman Saha (wk)	not out	203	272	26	6	74.63
Extras	(b 4, lb 3)	7				
Total	(4 wickets; 103.1 overs)	379/4	(3.67 runs per over)			

Fall of wickets 1-29 (Herwadkar, 9.6 ov), 2-48 (Mukund, 17.1 ov), 3-56 (Nair, 19.3 ov), 4-63 (Tiwary, 24.2 ov)

Bowling	O	M	R	W	Econ
Chintan Gaja	17	4	66	0	3.88
Mohit Thadani	20	5	84	1	4.20
Karan Patel	9	1	40	1	4.44
Ishwar Chaudhary	19	3	67	0	3.52
Hardik Patel	36.1	17	104	2	2.87
Manpreet Juneja	2	1	11	0	5.50
