= 2017–18 Duleep Trophy =

Cricket tournament

- Dates: 3 – 29 September 2017
- Administrator: BCCI
- Cricket format: First-class cricket
- Champions: India Red (1st title)
- Participants: 3
- Matches: 4
- Most runs: Priyank Panchal (293)
- Most wickets: Karn Sharma (15)

The 2017–18 Duleep Trophy was the 56th season of the Duleep Trophy, a first-class cricket tournament in India. It took place between 7 and 29 September 2017, with all of the matches being played as day/night fixtures. India Blue were the defending champions.

Initially, the Board of Control for Cricket in India (BCCI) had cancelled the tournament because of fixture congestion in both India's domestic and international calendar, but it was restored shortly after the original announcement. India Red qualified for the final, after winning their first game and drawing the second. The final round-robin match between India Blue and India Green ended in a draw, after three of the four days were washed out with no play possible. India Blue progressed to the final, as a result of their earlier drawn game against India Red. India Red won the tournament by beating India Blue by 163 runs in the final.

== Squads ==
India Red	India Blue	India Green
Dinesh Karthik (c, wk); Ishank Jaggi; Baba Indrajith; Basil Thampi; Ashoke Dinda; Gahlaut Rahul Singh; Chama Milind; Prithvi Shaw; Siddarth Kaul; Akhil Herwadkar; Vijay Gohil; Suryakumar Yadav; Washington Sundar; ~~Abhinav Mukund~~; ~~Ambati Rayudu~~; ~~Krishnappa Gowtham~~; ~~Priyank Panchal~~; ~~Sudip Chatterjee~~; ~~Rishabh Pant (wk)~~; ~~Karn Sharma~~	Suresh Raina (c); Samit Gohel; K. S. Bharat; Abhimanyu Easwaran; Manoj Tiwary; Deepak Hooda; Ishan Kishan (wk); Bhargav Bhatt; Ishant Sharma; Jaydev Unadkat; Akshay Wakhare; Pankaj Rao; Pankaj Singh; ~~Vijay Shankar~~; ~~Jayant Yadav~~; ~~Ankit Rajpoot~~; ~~Hanuma Vihari~~; ~~Sagun Kamat~~	Parthiv Patel (c, wk); Murali Vijay; Prashant Chopra; Parvez Rasool; Mayank Dagar; Nitin Saini; Aniket Choudhary; Varun Aaron; Kaushik Gandhi; Dhawal Kulkarni; Manpreet Juneja; Shivam Chaudhary; Amandeep Khare; Anupam Sanklecha; ~~Shreyas Iyer~~; ~~Ravikumar Samarth~~; ~~Karun Nair~~; ~~Ankit Bawne~~; ~~Shahbaz Nadeem~~; ~~Navdeep Saini~~; ~~Mohammed Siraj~~

Abhinav Mukund was unavailable because of dengue fever. Akhil Herwadkar replaced him on the India Red squad. Ambati Rayudu was unavailable for the tournament because of knee injury. Prithvi Shaw replaced him in India Red's squad. Siddarth Kaul, who was initially named in India Green, was picked by India Red as an injury replacement. Krishnappa Gowtham was left out of the squad. Priyank Panchal, Sudip Chatterjee, Rishabh Pant and Karn Sharma were released from India Red's squad for the India A series. Suryakumar Yadav and Washington Sundar were added to the India Red squad.

Vijay Shankar and Jayant Yadav were unavailable due to injuries. Akshay Wakhare and Pankaj Rao were named as replacements. Ankit Rajpoot was released from the India Blue squad for the India A series and Pankaj Singh was added to India Blue's squad. Sagun Kamat was released from the India Blue squad ahead of finals.

Shreyas Iyer was unavailable due to injury. Varun Aaron was added to India Green's squad as cover. Kaushik Gandhi who was initially named in India Blue's squad was added to India Green's squad. Karun Nair, Ravikumar Samarth, Ankit Bawne, Shahbaz Nadeem, Navdeep Saini and Mohammed Siraj were released from India Green's squad for the India A series and Manpreet Juneja, Shivam Chaudhary, Amandeep Khare and Anupam Sanklecha were added to India Green's squad. Dhawal Kulkarni who was initially named in India Blue's squad, was added to India Green's squad.

== Fixtures ==
=== Round-robin ===
7–10 September 2017 (D/N)
Scorecard

India Red	v	India Green
323 (110.5 overs); Priyank Panchal 105 (228); Murali Vijay 3/46 (11.5 overs)		157 (49.5 overs); Prashant Chopra 65 (119); Krishnappa Gowtham 5/46 (19.5 overs)
307/2d (75 overs); Priyank Panchal 133* (213); Murali Vijay 2/41 (13 overs)		303 (89.2 overs); Karun Nair 120 (203); Karn Sharma 6/94 (37.2 overs)

India Red won by 170 runs
Lucknow International Cricket Stadium, Lucknow
Umpires: Anil Dandekar and Virender Sharma
Player of the match: Priyank Panchal (India Red)

- India Red won the toss and elected to bat.

13–16 September 2017 (D/N)
Scorecard

India Red	v	India Blue
383 (108.3 overs); Baba Indrajith 200 (280); Ankit Rajpoot 3/56 (24 overs)		444 (114 overs); Deepak Hooda 133 (174); Karn Sharma 5/94 (25 overs)
133/5 (35 overs); Rishabh Pant 46 (23); Ankit Rajpoot 1/17 (3 overs)

Match drawn
Green Park Stadium, Kanpur
Umpires: Yeshwant Barde and Navdeep Singh
Player of the match: Baba Indrajith (India Red)

- India Red won the toss and elected to bat.
- Only four overs of play was possible on day 3 due to rain.
- Baba Indrajith (India Red) scored his first double-century in first-class cricket.
- Baba Indrajith and Vijay Gohil set a new record for the tenth-wicket partnership in the Duleep Trophy (178).

19–22 September 2017 (D/N)
Scorecard

India Blue	v	India Green
177 (52 overs); Manoj Tiwary 78 (138); Parvez Rasool 5/70 (17 overs)		100/3 (31.5 overs); Kaushik Gandhi 39 (72); Ishant Sharma 1/15 (7 overs)

Match drawn
Green Park Stadium, Kanpur
Umpires: K. N. Ananthapadmanabhan and Nand Kishore
Player of the match: Parvez Rasool (India Green)

- India Blue won the toss and elected to bat.
- No play was possible on days 2, 3 and 4 due to rain.

=== Final ===
25–29 September 2017 (D/N)
Scorecard

India Red	v	India Blue
483 (127.2 overs); Prithvi Shaw 154 (249); Bhargav Bhatt 4/154 (42 overs)		299 (67 overs); Abhimanyu Easwaran 127 (171); Washington Sundar 5/94 (24 overs)
208 (67.5 overs); Baba Indrajith 59 (116); Akshay Wakhare 4/66 (22.5 overs)		229 (48 overs); Bhargav Bhatt 51 (41); Washington Sundar 6/87 (24 overs)

India Red won by 163 runs
Lucknow International Cricket Stadium, Lucknow
Umpires: Anil Chaudhary and Nitin Menon
Player of the match: Washington Sundar (India Red)

- India Red won the toss and elected to bat.
