= 2015–16 Deodhar Trophy =

- Dates: 25 January 2016 – 29 January 2016
- Administrator: BCCI
- Cricket format: List A cricket
- Tournament format(s): Double round robin and Knockout
- Host(s): Green Park, Kanpur, India
- Champions: India A (1st title)
- Participants: 3
- Matches: 4

2015–16 Deodhar Trophy was the 43rd season of the Deodhar Trophy, a List A competition. It was played in a three team format between Gujarat, the winners of 2015–16 Vijay Hazare Trophy, and two teams selected by the BCCI.

== Squads ==
India A and India B squads were announced on 5 January 2016.

India A	India B	Gujarat
Ambati Rayudu (c); Varun Aaron; Sreenath Aravind; Sudip Chatterjee; Krishna Das; Faiz Fazal; Kedar Jadhav; Siddarth Kaul; Mandeep Singh; Amit Mishra; Shahbaz Nadeem; Naman Ojha (wk); Parvez Rasool; Jalaj Saxena; Murali Vijay	Unmukt Chand (c); Mayank Agarwal; Baba Aparajith; Stuart Binny; Shreyas Iyer; Sheldon Jackson (wk); Dinesh Karthik (wk); Dhawal Kulkarni; Pawan Negi; Sachin Baby; Karn Sharma; Nathu Singh; Shardul Thakur; Jayant Yadav; Suryakumar Yadav	Parthiv Patel (c) & (wk); Mehul Patel; Priyank Kirit Panchal; Rujul Bhatt; Chirag Gandhi; Manpreet Juneja; Rush Kalaria; Kavish Panchal; Axar Patel; Dhwanil Patel; Hardik Patel; Karan Patel; Santosh Shinde; RP Singh; Raxlee Taylor

== Group stage ==
Points table

Team	Pld	W	L	Tie	N/R	Pts	NRR
India B	2	2	0	0	0	8	+1.231
India A	2	1	1	0	0	4	−1.012
Gujarat	2	0	2	0	0	0	−0.232

Matches

25 January 2016
Scorecard

India A 161 (44.2 overs)	v	India B 162/5 (29.2 overs)
Parvez Rasool 66 (94); Nathu Singh 3/23 (8 overs)		Unmukt Chand 77* (82); Amit Mishra 3/62 (9 overs)

India B won by 5 wickets
Green Park Stadium, Kanpur
Umpires: Anil Chaudhary (Ind) and Navdeep Singh (Ind)

- India B won the toss and elected to field.

26 January 2016
Scorecard

India B 280/8 (50 overs)	v	Gujarat; 273 (49.3 overs)
Unmukt Chand 63 (70); Mehul Patel 3/69 (10 overs)		Chirag Gandhi 100* (77); Dhawal Kulkarni 2/21 (10 overs)

India B won by 7 runs
Green Park Stadium, Kanpur
Umpires: Nitin Menon (Ind) and Navdeep Singh (Ind)

- Gujarat won the toss and elected to field.
- Dhwanil Patel, Santosh Shinde and Raxlee Taylor (Gujarat) all made their List A debuts.

27 January 2016
Scorecard

Gujarat; 272 (49.2 overs)	v	India A 273/4 (47.2 overs)
Parthiv Patel 119 (125); Parvez Rasool 3/47 (9 overs)		Kedar Jadhav 91 (61); Mehul Patel 2/53 (9 overs)

India A won by 6 wickets
Green Park Stadium, Kanpur
Umpires: Anil Chaudhary (Ind) and Navdeep Singh (Ind)

- India A won the toss and elected to field
- Kavish Panchal (Gujarat) made his List A debut.

== Final ==
Final
29 January 2016
Scorecard

India A 286/7 (50 overs)	v	India B 199 (40.4 overs)
Faiz Fazal 100 (112); Dhawal Kulkarni 2/31 (10 overs)		Stuart Binny 60 (73); Shahbaz Nadeem 3/36 (9.4 overs)

India A win by 87 runs
Green Park Stadium, Kanpur
Umpires: AK Chaudhary and Nitin Menon
Player of the match: Faiz Fazal (India A)

- India A won toss and elected to bat.
