= Panchal (disambiguation) =

Panchal is an Indian caste.

Panchal may also refer to:

== People ==
- Ishita Panchal
- Sitaram Panchal
- Heena Panchal
- Minal Panchal
- Priyank Panchal
- Mangesh Panchal
- Jaikishan Dayabhai Panchal
- Shirish Panchal
- Kavish Panchal
- Ketan Panchal
- Neelam Panchal
- Shanti Panchal
- Preeti Panchal
- Avani Panchal
- Panchal Mansaram

== Other ==
- Kya Hal Mr. Panchal (TV Series)
- Panchal brahmin
- Pir Panchal

== See also ==
- Panchala
