= 2025 Canada Tri-Nation Series =

Fourteenth tri-nation series round in 2024-26 WCL2

- Part of 2024–2026 Cricket World Cup League 2
- Date: 27 August – 6 September 2025
- Location: Canada
Teams
Canada	Namibia	Scotland
Captains
Nicholas Kirton	Gerhard Erasmus	Richie Berrington
Most runs
Shreyas Movva (94) Saad Bin Zafar (94)	Jan Frylinck (177)	George Munsey (143)
Most wickets
Kaleem Sana (5)	Bernard Scholtz (8)	Brad Currie (6)

The 2025 Canada Tri-Nation Series was the fourteenth round of the 2024–2026 Cricket World Cup League 2 cricket tournament which took place in Canada in August and September 2025. It was a tri-nation series contested by the men's national teams of the Canada, Namibia and Scotland. The matches were played as One Day International (ODI) fixtures.

== Squads ==
Canada	Namibia	Scotland
Nicholas Kirton (c); Shahid Ahmadzai; Dilpreet Bajwa; Mansab Gill; Dillon Heyliger; Akhil Kumar; Shreyas Movva (wk); Ali Nadeem (wk); Saad Bin Zafar; Yuvraj Samra; Kaleem Sana; Shivam Sharma; Jaskaran Singh; Pargat Singh; Kanwarpal Tathgur (wk); Harsh Thaker	Gerhard Erasmus (c); Jan Nicol Loftie-Eaton (vc); Jan Balt; Jack Brassell; Jan-Izak de Villiers; Jan Frylinck; Zane Green (wk); Jean-Pierre Kotze (wk); Malan Kruger; Dylan Leicher; Tangeni Lungameni; Willem Myburgh; Bernard Scholtz; Ben Shikongo; JJ Smit; Ruben Trumpelmann	Richie Berrington (c); Tom Bruce; Matthew Cross (wk); Brad Currie; Josh Davey; Jasper Davidson; Chris Greaves; Jack Jarvis; Michael Leask; Finlay McCreath; Brandon McMullen; George Munsey; Safyaan Sharif; Charlie Tear (wk); Mark Watt

Namibia named Peter-Daniel Blignaut, Shaun Fouché, Junior Kariata and Simon Shikongo as reserves in their squad.

== Tour matches ==
Warm-up matches

14 August 2025
10:00
Scorecard

Canada Emerging; 191 (49.5 overs)	v	Canada A 192/2 (43 overs)
Ashish Malhotra 43 (59); Salman Nazar 3/38 (8.5 overs)		Samit Gohel 84* (122); Ben Breitmeyer 1/30 (5 overs)

Canada A won by 8 wickets
Maple Leaf Cricket Club, King City
Player of the match: Samit Gohel (Canada A)

- Canada A won the toss and elected to field.

15 August 2025
10:00
Scorecard

Canada Emerging; 199 (46.2 overs)	v	Canada A 188 (49 overs)
Roopkaran Singh 56 (89); Salman Nazar 4/45 (10 overs)		Mansab Gill 57 (89); Muhammad Ali Khan 4/35 (10 overs)

Canada Emerging won by 11 runs
Maple Leaf Cricket Club, King City

- Canada Emerging won the toss and elected to bat.

18 August 2025
10:30
Scorecard

Namibia; 87 (35.4 overs)	v	Canada A 77 (28 overs)
JJ Smit 38* (64); Sukhjinder Singh 4/11 (8 overs)		Samit Gohel 27 (73); Jan Nicol Loftie-Eaton 3/23 (5 overs)

Namibia won by 10 runs
Toronto Cricket Club, Toronto
Player of the match: JJ Smit (Nam)

- Namibia won the toss and elected to bat.

18 August 2025
10:30
Scorecard

Canada Emerging; 179/13 (50 overs)	v	Canada; 181/6 (33.1 overs)
Ben Breitmeyer 40 (45); Sheel Patel 4/28 (9 overs)		Ali Nadeem 70 (70); Padam Joshi 2/29 (6 overs)

Canada won by 8 wickets
Maple Leaf Cricket Club, King City
Player of the match: Sheel Patel (Can)

- Canada Emerging won the toss and elected to bat.

21 August 2025
10:00
Scorecard

Canada; 267/1 (50 overs)	v	Canada Emerging; 127 (31.5 overs)
Ali Nadeem 57* (64); Rishiv Joshi 1/22 (5 overs)		Dilraj Deol 36 (61); Harsh Thaker 3/1 (1.5 overs)

Canada won by 140 runs
Maple Leaf Cricket Club, King City

- Canada won the toss and elected to bat.

21 August 2025
11:20
Scorecard

Namibia; 262/6 (50 overs)	v	Canada A 116 (34.3 overs)
Gerhard Erasmus 110 (124); Sukhjinder Singh 2/43 (10 overs)		Ajayveer Hundal 49* (82); Bernard Scholtz 6/4 (6 overs)

Namibia won by 146 runs
Maple Leaf Cricket Club, King City

- Namibia won the toss and elected to bat.

22 August 2025
11:15
Scorecard

Namibia; 242/8 (50 overs)	v	Canada A 109 (29.3 overs)
Jean-Pierre Kotze 102 (135); Sukhjinder Singh 5/35 (9 overs)		Rahul Vashishtha 30* (39); Ruben Trumpelmann 4/21 (6 overs)

Namibia won by 133 runs
Toronto Cricket Club, Toronto
Player of the match: Sukhjinder Singh (Canada A)

- Namibia won the toss and elected to bat.

== Fixtures ==
=== 1st ODI ===
27 August 2025
10:30
Scorecard

Canada; 219 (49.1 overs)	v	Namibia; 220/5 (48.2 overs)
Ali Nadeem 46 (66); Jan Nicol Loftie-Eaton 3/22 (7.1 overs)		Jan Frylinck 114 (146); Kaleem Sana 3/40 (9 overs)

Namibia won by 5 wickets
Maple Leaf North-West Ground, King City
Umpires: Harry Grewal (Can) and Shaun Haig (NZ)
Player of the match: Jan Frylinck (Nam)

- Namibia won the toss and elected to field.
- Ali Nadeem, Jaskaran Singh (Can) and Willem Myburgh (Nam) all made their ODI debuts.
- Jan Frylinck (Nam) scored his first century in ODIs.

=== 2nd ODI ===
29 August 2025
10:30
Scorecard

Namibia	v	Scotland

Match abandoned
Maple Leaf North-West Ground, King City
Umpires: Harry Grewal (Can) and Rohan Shah (Can)

- No toss.
- No play was possible due to rain.

=== 3rd ODI ===
31 August 2025
10:30
Scorecard

Canada; 184 (48.1 overs)	v	Scotland; 187/3 (41.5 overs)
Shreyas Movva 60 (110); Brad Currie 4/26 (10 overs)		George Munsey 84* (103); Kaleem Sana 2/20 (5 overs)

Scotland won by 7 wickets
Maple Leaf North-West Ground, King City
Umpires: Shaun Haig (NZ) and Rohan Shah (Can)
Player of the match: George Munsey (Sco)

- Scotland won the toss and elected to field.
- Tom Bruce (Sco) made his ODI debut.

=== 4th ODI ===
2 September 2025
10:30
Scorecard

Namibia; 261/8 (50 overs)	v	Canada; 237 (48.3 overs)
Malan Kruger 80 (132); Akhil Kumar 3/47 (10 overs)		Nicholas Kirton 46 (44); Bernard Scholtz 4/31 (10 overs)

Namibia won by 24 runs
Maple Leaf North-West Ground, King City
Umpires: Shaun Haig (NZ) and Rohan Shah (Can)
Player of the match: Bernard Scholtz (Nam)

- Canada won the toss and elected to field.

=== 5th ODI ===
4 September 2025
10:30
Scorecard

Scotland; 164 (24 overs)	v	Namibia; 109 (21.2 overs)
George Munsey 59 (31); Ruben Trumpelmann 3/24 (5 overs)		Zane Green 27 (32); Chris Greaves 3/24 (3 overs)

Scotland won by 55 runs
Maple Leaf North-West Ground, King City
Umpires: Harry Grewal (Can) and Rohan Shah (Can)
Player of the match: George Munsey (Sco)

- Scotland won the toss and elected to bat.
- The match was reduced to 24 overs per side due to rain.
- Bernard Scholtz became the first player to take 100 wickets for Namibia in men's ODIs.

=== 6th ODI ===
6 September 2025
10:30
Scorecard

Canada	v	Scotland

Match abandoned
Maple Leaf North-West Ground, King City
Umpires: Harry Grewal (Can) and Shaun Haig (NZ)

- No toss.
- No play was possible due to rain.
