= Halai =

Halai may refer to:

- Frank Halai (born 1988), New Zealand rugby player
- Vijay Halai (born 1992), Indian cricketer
- Battle of Halai (1894), at Halai, Eritrea, in the First Italo-Ethiopian War
- Halai, Eritrea, a town in the Southern region (Debub) of Eritrea

== See also ==
- Halae (disambiguation), sometimes transliterated Halai, various Greek towns named Ἁλαί 'salt springs'
