= Raxlee Taylor =

Indian cricketer (born 1995)

Personal information
- Full name: Raxlee Rajan Taylor
- Born: 20 March 1995 (age 31); Ahmedabad, Gujarat, India
- Batting: Right-handed
- Bowling: Left-arm medium
- Source: Cricinfo, 10 January 2016

Raxlee Rajan Taylor (born 20 March 1995) is an Indian cricketer who played for Gujarat. He made his Twenty20 debut on 3 January 2016 in the 2015–16 Syed Mushtaq Ali Trophy. He made his List A debut on 26 January 2016 in the 2015–16 Deodhar Trophy.
