= Viraj Bhosale =

Indian cricketer (born 1992)

Personal information
- Full name: Viraj Suresh Bhosale
- Born: 4 April 1992 (age 34); Baroda, Gujarat, India
- Batting: Right-handed
- Bowling: Right-arm offbreak
- Role: Wicket-keeper batsman

Domestic team information
- Years: Team
- 2016–: Baroda
- Source: Cricinfo, 10 December 2016

Viraj Suresh Bhosale (born 4 April 1992) is an Indian cricketer. He plays for Baroda cricket team. He made his first-class debut for Baroda in the 2016–17 Ranji Trophy on 7 December 2016 against Uttar Pradesh at Hutatma Anant Kanhere Maidan in Nashik.
