= Halae (disambiguation) =

Halae or Halai (Ancient Greek: Ἁλαί) 'salt springs' was an ancient town in Locris, Boeotia.

Halae may also refer to other places associated with salt:

- Halae (Cilicia), ancient Cilicia, Anatolia
- Halae Aexonides, ancient Attica, Greece
- Halae Araphenides, ancient Attica, Greece

== See also ==
- Halai (disambiguation)
