= Mohit Thadani =

Indian cricketer (born 1991)

Mohit Kishore Thadani (born 2 July 1991) is a Rajasthani cricketer. He plays for Gujarat and made his debut in first-class cricket on 20 January 2017 against the Rest of India in the 2016–17 Irani Cup.
