= List of Ranji Trophy triple centuries =

In cricket, a batsman reaches a triple century if they score 300 or more runs in a single innings. The Ranji Trophy is the premier first-class cricket championship played in India. Conducted by the Board of Control for Cricket in India, it was founded in 1934 as "The Cricket Championship of India". As of January 2020, a triple century has been scored on 46 occasions by 41 different batsmen in the Ranji Trophy.

The first triple century in the Ranji Trophy was scored by Maharashtra's Vijay Hazare against Baroda in the 1939–40 season. As of November January 2023, the most recent triple century in the tournament was scored by Prithvi Shaw from Mumbai, who made 379 against Assam in the 2022–23 season. The highest score in the competition was made by B. B. Nimbalkar, who scored 443 runs not out for Maharashtra against Kathiawar in the 1948–49 season. It is the only instance of a quadruple century in the tournament. The highest number of triple centuries are scored by Ravindra Jadeja, who has reached the milestone three times while playing for Saurashtra. Jadeja is followed by V. V. S. Laxman, Cheteshwar Pujara, and Wasim Jaffer, with two triple centuries each. Tamil Nadu's Woorkeri Raman and Arjan Kripal Singh are the only two batsmen to score triple centuries in the same innings. As of December 2016, five batsmen have scored 290–299 runs in an innings, and three of them were not out.

Eight triple centuries have been made by players of Mumbai, which is more than any other team. Maharashtra have conceded five triple centuries, which is followed by four from Odisha and Goa & Jammu and Kashmir with three each. Wankhede Stadium in Mumbai has had six Ranji Trophy triple centuries scored at the venue, more than any other ground.

== Triple centuries and above ==
=== Key ===
	Description
*	denotes that the batsman remained not out.
†	denotes that the total was the highest first-class score at the time.
Mins	denotes how many minutes the player batted for.
BF	denotes how many deliveries the player faced.
4s	denotes the number of fours hit
6s	denotes the number of sixes hit.
Inns	denotes which of the team's batting innings the triple century was scored in.
Date	denotes the date the match started on.
Won	The match was won by the triple century scorer's team.

Ranji Trophy triple centuries
No.	Score	Mins	BF	4s	6s	Player	For	Against	Inns	Venue	Date	Result	Ref.
1	316* †	387	–	37	0	Vijay Hazare	Maharashtra	Baroda	2	Poona Club Ground (Note: Poona is now known as Pune.)	21 January 1940	Drawn	
2	359* †	640	–	31	0	Vijay Merchant	Bombay (Note: Bombay was renamed as Mumbai in 1995.)	Maharashtra	1	Brabourne Stadium, Bombay	31 December 1943	Drawn	
3	319	533	–	–	–	Gul Mohammad	Baroda	Holkar	2	Central College Ground, Baroda (Note: Baroda has now been renamed as Vadodara. However the Baroda cricket team has not been renamed.)	7 March 1947	Won	
4	443* †	1006	–	49	1	B. B. Nimbalkar	Maharashtra	Kathiawar (Note: Kathiawar is now known as Saurashtra.)	2	Poona Club Ground	16 December 1948	Won	
5	323	484	–	40	0	Ajit Wadekar	Bombay	Mysore (Note: Mysore cricket team is now known as Karnataka cricket team.)	2	Brabourne Stadium, Bombay	24 February 1967	Won	
6	340	545	–	46	2	Sunil Gavaskar	Bombay	Bengal	2	Wankhede Stadium, Bombay	25 February 1982	Won	
7	303*	605	478	38	1	Abdul Azeem	Hyderabad	Tamil Nadu	1	Gymkhana Ground, Secunderabad	13 December 1986	Drawn	
8	313	575	411	31	0	Woorkeri Raman	Tamil Nadu	Goa	1	Bhausaheb Bandodkar Ground, Panaji	20 January 1989	Drawn	
9	302*	560	400	20	0	Arjan Kripal Singh	Tamil Nadu	Goa	1	Bhausaheb Bandodkar Ground, Panaji	20 January 1989	Drawn	
10	377	666	473	50	5	Sanjay Manjrekar	Bombay	Hyderabad	1	Wankhede Stadium, Bombay	24 April 1991	Drawn	
11	366	699	523	37	5	M. V. Sridhar	Hyderabad	Andhra Pradesh	2	Gymkhana Ground, Secunderabad	8 January 1994	Drawn	
12	312	567	392	25	2	Raman Lamba	Delhi	Himachal Pradesh	2	Feroz Shah Kotla, Delhi	31 December 1994	Won	
13	314	680	501	47	0	Wasim Jaffer	Mumbai	Saurashtra	2	Municipal Stadium, Rajkot (Note: Municipal Stadium was later renamed to Madhavrao Scindia Cricket Ground.)	4 November 1996	Drawn	
14	301*	609	434	28	0	V. V. S. Laxman	Hyderabad	Bihar	1	Keenan Stadium, Jamshedpur	5 February 1998	Won	
15	323	597	454	33	5	Devang Gandhi	Bengal	Assam	2	Northeast Frontier Railway Stadium, Guwahati	25 December 1998	Won	
16	305*	601	482	30	2	Pankaj Dharmani	Punjab	Jammu and Kashmir	2	Punjab Agricultural University Stadium, Ludhiana	6 November 1999	Won	
17	353	758	560	52	2	V. V. S. Laxman	Hyderabad	Karnataka	1	M. Chinnaswamy Stadium, Bangalore	11 April 2000	Drawn	
18	308*	499	409	15	5	Dinesh Mongia	Punjab	Jammu and Kashmir	2	Gandhi Stadium, Jalandhar	5 November 2000	Won	
19	300*	695	500	40	0	Shiv Sunder Das	Orissa (Note: Orissa is now known as Odisha.)	Jammu and Kashmir	1	Barabati Stadium, Cuttack	25 December 2006	Drawn	
20	306*	634	462	37	0	Sreekumar Nair	Kerala	Services	1	Fort Maidan, Palakkad	15 November 2007	Drawn	
21	300*	568	383	33	5	Abhinav Mukund	Tamil Nadu	Maharashtra	1	Hutatma Anant Kanhere Maidan, Nashik	3 November 2008	Drawn	
22	302*	603	423	33	3	Cheteshwar Pujara	Saurashtra	Orissa	1	Saurashtra Cricket Association Stadium, Rajkot	10 November 2008	Won	
23	301	635	459	27	0	Wasim Jaffer	Mumbai	Saurashtra	1	M. A. Chidambaram Stadium, Chennai	4 January 2009	Drawn	
24	312	473	333	44	7	Sunny Singh	Haryana	Madhya Pradesh	1	Emerald High School Ground, Indore	3 November 2009	Drawn	
25	309*	458	322	38	4	Rohit Sharma	Mumbai	Gujarat	1	Brabourne Stadium, Mumbai	15 December 2009	Drawn	
26	301*	812	582	36	3	Aakash Chopra	Rajasthan	Maharashtra	1	Hutatma Anant Kanhere Maidan, Nashik	15 December 2010	Drawn	
27	314	558	375	29	9	Ravindra Jadeja	Saurashtra	Orissa	1	Barabati Stadium, Cuttack	3 November 2011	Drawn	
28	327	524	312	54	2	Kedar Jadhav	Maharashtra	Uttar Pradesh	1	Subrata Roy Sahara Stadium, Pune (Note: The Subrata Roy Sahara Stadium was later renamed to Maharashtra Cricket Association Stadium.)	9 November 2012	Drawn	
29	303*	561	400	35	2	Ravindra Jadeja	Saurashtra	Gujarat	2	Lalabhai Contractor Stadium, Surat	9 November 2012	Drawn	
30	331	707	501	29	7	Ravindra Jadeja	Saurashtra	Railways	1	Saurashtra Cricket Association Stadium, Rajkot	1 December 2012	Drawn	
31	352	548	427	49	1	Cheteshwar Pujara	Saurashtra	Karnataka	3	Saurashtra University Ground, Rajkot	6 January 2013	Drawn	
32	300*	823	609	34	2	Taruwar Kohli	Punjab	Jharkhand	2	Keenan Stadium, Jamshedpur	6 January 2013	Drawn	
33	337	671	448	47	4	K. L. Rahul	Karnataka	Uttar Pradesh	1	M. Chinnaswamy Stadium, Bangalore	29 January 2015	Drawn	
34	308	504	311	38	6	K. S. Bharat	Andhra Pradesh	Goa	1	CSR Sharma College Ground, Ongole	6 February 2015	Won	
35	328	872	560	46	1	Karun Nair	Karnataka	Tamil Nadu	2	Wankhede Stadium, Mumbai	8 March 2015	Won	
36	351*	717	521	37	5	Swapnil Gugale	Maharashtra	Delhi	1	Wankhede Stadium, Mumbai	13 October 2016	Drawn	
37	308	514	326	42	9	Rishabh Pant	Delhi	Maharashtra	2	Wankhede Stadium, Mumbai	13 October 2016	Drawn	
38	304	662	453	39	0	Sagun Kamat	Goa	Services	1	DRIEMS Ground, Cuttack	20 October 2016	Drawn	
39	314*	776	460	32	0	Priyank Panchal	Gujarat	Punjab	1	KSCA Stadium, Belgaum	29 November 2016	Drawn	
40	359*	964	723	45	1	Samit Gohel	Gujarat	Odisha	3	Sawai Mansingh Stadium, Jaipur	23 December 2016	Drawn	
41	338	511	363	44	2	Prashant Chopra	Himachal Pradesh	Punjab	1	Himachal Pradesh Cricket Association Stadium, Dharamsala	7 October 2017	Drawn	
42	302*	682	456	29	2	Hanuma Vihari	Andhra	Odisha	1	Dr PVG Raju ACA Sports Complex, Vizianagaram	25 October 2017	Drawn	
43	304*		494	28	4	Mayank Agarwal	Karnataka	Maharashtra	2	Maharashtra Cricket Association Stadium, Pune	3 November 2017	Won	
44	343		332	53	1	Puneet Bisht	Meghalaya	Sikkim	2	KIIT Stadium	1 January 2019	Drawn	
45	303*		414	30	5	Manoj Tiwary	Bengal	Hyderabad	1	Kalyani	19 January 2020	Won	
46	301*		391	30	8	Sarfaraz Khan	Mumbai	Uttar Pradesh	2	Wankhede Stadium, Mumbai	22 January 2020	Drawn	
47	341		405	56	2	Sakibul Gani	Bihar	Mizoram	1	Jadavpur University Ground	18 February 2022	Won	
48	379		383	49	4	Prithvi Shaw	Mumbai	Assam	1	Amingaon	10 January 2023	Won	
49	321		403	23	5	Narayan Jagadeesan	Tamil Nadu	Chandigarh	2	Sri Ramakrishna College of Arts and Science Ground	26 January 2024	Won	
50	366		181	34	26	Tanmay Agarwal	Hyderabad	Arunachal Pradesh	2	Hyderabad	26 January 2024	Won	
51	300*		360	25	13	Mahipal Lomror	Rajasthan	Uttarakhand	1	Abhimanyu Cricket Academy	13 November 2024	Drawn	
52	314*		215	45	4	Snehal Kauthankar	Goa	Arunachal Pradesh	2	Goa Cricket Association Academy Ground	13 November 2024	Won	
53	300*		269	39	2	Kashyap Bhagale	Goa	Arunachal Pradesh	2	Goa Cricket Association Academy Ground	13 November 2024	Won	
54	304*		423	33	5	Chetan Bist	Nagaland	Mizoram	1	Nadiad	13 November 2024	Won	
55	400*		517	46	7	Chinmay Sutar	Mizoram	Nagaland	1	Nagaland Cricket Association Stadium	19 October 2026	Draw	
56	321*		492	36	1	Priyanshu Moliya	Baroda	Jammu and Kashmir	1	Reliance Stadium	27 October 2026	Draw	
