= Shubek Gill =

Indian cricketer (born 1991)

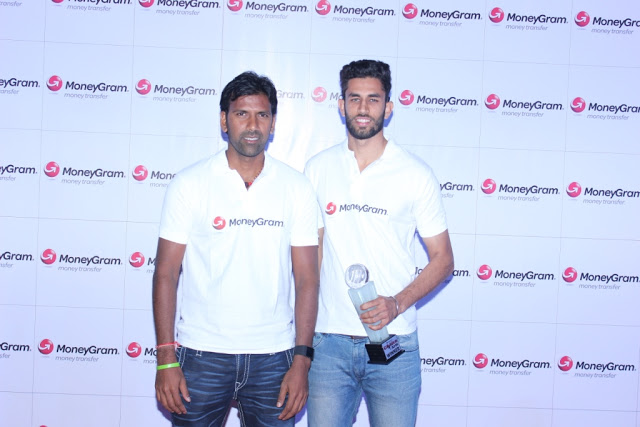
- Gill (right) with Lakshmipathy Balaji (left)

Personal information
- Full name: Shubek Singh Gill
- Born: 16 December 1991 (age 34); Dehradun, India
- Batting: Right-handed
- Bowling: Right-arm fast
- Role: Bowler

Domestic team information
- Years: Team
- 2015 - Present: Punjab
- Source: ESPNcricinfo, 13 October 2016

Shubek Gill (born 16 December 1991) is an Indian cricketer. He made his first-class debut for Punjab in the 2016–17 Ranji Trophy on 13 October 2016. In January 2018, his name was included in the 578 players for the 2018 IPL auction, due to be held in Bengaluru on 27 January 2018.
