= Shivakant Shukla =

Indian cricketer (born 1986)

Personal information
- Full name: Shivakant Shivprasad Shukla
- Born: 26 January 1986 (age 40); Allahabad, India

Domestic team information
- Years: Team
- 2003–2010: Uttar Pradesh
- 2011–2018: Railways

Career statistics
Competition	FC	LA	T20
Matches	83	35	5
Runs scored	4189	909	32
Batting average	30.35	27.54	6.40
100s/50s	7/19	1/4	0/0
Top score	178*	122*	11
Balls bowled	1959	215	–
Wickets	26	7	–
Bowling average	41.23	25.28	–
5 wickets in innings	0	0	–
10 wickets in match	0	0	–
Best bowling	3/12	2/20	–
Catches/stumpings	87/0	7	0/0
- Source: Cricinfo, 17 December 2017

Shivakant Shukla (born 26 January 1986) is an Indian first-class cricketer who played for Railways.
