= Akash Parkar =

Indian cricketer (born 1994)

Aakash P Parkar
Personal information
- Born: 20 May 1994 (age 32)
- Batting: Right-handed
- Bowling: Right-arm medium-fast

Career statistics
Competition	T20
Matches	1
Runs scored	10
Batting average	–
100s/50s	0/0
Top score	10*
Balls bowled	12
Wickets	1
Bowling average	19.00
5 wickets in innings	0
10 wickets in match	0
Best bowling	1/19
Catches/stumpings	0/0

Aakash P Parkar (born 20 May 1994) is a cricket player from Mumbai. He made his T20 debut for Mumbai on 1 April 2015 against Odisha. He made his List A debut for Mumbai for 2017–18 Vijay Hazare Trophy on 5 February 2018 and for 2017–18 Ranji Trophy on Oct 14, 2017 against Madhya Pradesh cricket team in Indore.
