= Waseem Ahmed (cricketer) =

Indian cricketer (born 1993)

Personal information
- Born: 11 December 1993 (age 32); Gwalior, Madhya Pradesh
- Batting: Right handed
- Role: Opening batter

Domestic team information
- Years: Team
- 2017–18: Madhya Pradesh
- Source: Cricinfo, 6 October 2017

Waseem Ahmed (born 11 December 1993) is an Indian cricketer. He made his first-class debut for Madhya Pradesh in the 2017–18 Ranji Trophy on 6 October 2017.
