= Rudresh Vaghela =

Indian cricketer (born 1993)

Personal information
- Born: 2 November 1993 (age 33)
- Batting: Right-handed
- Bowling: Slow left arm orthodox

Domestic team information
- Years: Team
- 2017–18: Baroda
- Source: Cricinfo, 1 November 2017

Rudresh Vaghela (born 2 November 1993) is an Indian cricketer. He made his first-class debut for Baroda in the 2017–18 Ranji Trophy on 1 November 2017.
