= Imtiyaz Ahmed =

Indian cricketer (born 1985)

Imtiaz Ahmed
Personal information
- Born: 10 November 1985 (age 41); Bhadohi, Uttar Pradesh, India
- Batting: Right-handed
- Bowling: Right-arm fast-medium
- Role: Bowler

Domestic team information
- Years: Team
- 2007/08–2018/19: Uttar Pradesh

Career statistics
Competition	FC	LA	T20
Matches	45	20	20
Runs scored	691	46	150
Batting average	17.27	5.75	15.00
100s/50s	0/1	0/0	0/0
Top score	53*	14*	34*
Balls bowled	7,867	935	414
Wickets	138	26	17
Bowling average	31.00	27.30	31.47
5 wickets in innings	7	0	0
10 wickets in match	1	0	0
Best bowling	6/110	4/65	4/5
Catches/stumpings	15/–	3/–	2/–
- Source: CricketArchive, 1 April 2025

Imtiaz Ahmed (born 10 November 1985), is an Indian former first-class cricketer who played for Uttar Pradesh in domestic cricket. He is a right-arm fast-medium bowler. He was part of the Pune Warriors squad in 2011 for the Indian Premier League. He was signed by the Chennai Super Kings in 2013.
