= Dhruv Patel =

Indian cricketer (born 1997)

Personal information
- Full name: Dhruv Bharghav Patel
- Born: 12 September 1997 (age 29); Mumbai, Maharashtra, India
- Source: ESPNcricinfo, 17 November 2017

Dhruv Patel (born 12 September 1997) is an Indian cricketer. He made his first-class debut for Baroda in the 2017–18 Ranji Trophy on 17 November 2017. He made his List A debut on 20 February 2021, for Baroda in the 2020–21 Vijay Hazare Trophy.
