= Minad Manjrekar =

Indian cricketer (born 1996)

Personal information
- Born: 5 October 1996 (age 30)
- Source: ESPNcricinfo, 14 October 2017

Minad Manjrekar (born 5 October 1996) is an Indian cricketer. He made his first-class debut for Mumbai in the 2017–18 Ranji Trophy on 14 October 2017.
