= Samarth Singh =

Indian cricketer (born 1991)

Personal information
- Born: 11 September 1991 (age 35); Delhi, India
- Batting: Right-handed
- Bowling: Right-arm leg spin

Domestic team information
- Years: Team
- 2016–: Uttar Pradesh

Career statistics
Competition	FC	LA	T20
Matches	11	5	23
Runs scored	484	255	682
Batting average	30.25	63.75	32.47
100s/50s	1/2	1/1	0/5
Top score	187	115*	93
Catches/stumpings	6/–	3/–	9/–
- Source: ESPNcricinfo, 4 March 2019

Samarth Singh (born 11 September 1991) is an Indian cricketer. He made his first-class debut for Uttar Pradesh in the 2016–17 Ranji Trophy on 13 October 2016. On 20 and 21 October 2016, he scored his maiden first-class century in his second match, scoring 187 runs against Tamil Nadu. On 6 October 2018, he scored his first century in List A cricket, with an unbeaten 115 against Andhra Pradesh.
