= Deepak Hooda =

Indian cricketer (born 1995)

Personal information
- Full name: Deepak Jagbir Hooda
- Born: 19 April 1995 (age 31); Rohtak, Haryana, India
- Height: 6 ft 1 in (185 cm)
- Batting: Right-handed
- Bowling: Right-arm off break
- Role: All-rounder

International information
- National side: India (2022–2023)
- ODI debut (cap 243): 6 February 2022 v West Indies
- Last ODI: 30 November 2022 v New Zealand
- ODI shirt no.: 57
- T20I debut (cap 97): 24 February 2022 v Sri Lanka
- Last T20I: 1 February 2023 v New Zealand
- T20I shirt no.: 57

Domestic team information
- Years: Team
- 2012/13–2019/20: Baroda
- 2015: Rajasthan Royals (squad no. 5)
- 2016–2019: Sunrisers Hyderabad (squad no. 5)
- 2020–2021: Punjab Kings
- 2021/22-present: Rajasthan
- 2022-2024: Lucknow Super Giants
- 2025: Chennai Super Kings

Career statistics
Competition	ODI	T20I	FC	LA
Matches	10	21	60	102
Runs scored	153	368	3,693	3,098
Batting average	25.5	30.67	43.96	39.21
100s/50s	0/0	1/0	12/18	6/15
Top score	33	104	293*	180
Balls bowled	150	95	2,221	1,544
Wickets	3	6	26	39
Bowling average	39.66	12.67	41.61	30.23
5 wickets in innings	0	0	2	1
10 wickets in match	0	0	0	0
Best bowling	1/6	4/10	5/31	5/55
Catches/stumpings	3/–	1/–	53/–	45/–
- Source: ESPNcricinfo, 18 April 2025

Deepak Jagbir Hooda (born 19 April 1995) is an Indian international cricketer who has represented his country in One Day International and Twenty20 International cricket. Domestically he plays for Rajasthan and has appeared in the Indian Premier League for several teams, most recently Chennai Super Kings. He is an all-rounder who bats right-handed and bowls right-arm off break. He made his international debut for India in February 2022.

== Early life ==
Born to Jagbir Hooda, a warrant officer in the Indian Air Force, Deepak Hooda was active in sports since childhood. He started playing cricket at a young age and played at senior level at the age of 14 when he represented Kendriya Vidyalaya U-17 cricket team in the SGFI in the year 2009. He became a batting all-rounder, known for his powerful hitting and ability to clear the fence.

== Domestic career ==
According to his coach, Sanjiv Sawant, Hooda is a "very accurate bowler". Hooda is also known to be an agile fielder. He made his IPL debut on 10 April 2015 for Rajasthan Royals against Punjab Kings (then Kings XI Punjab) and scored 30 off 15 balls. In his second match in IPL for Rajasthan Royals vs Delhi Daredevils, he scored his maiden half-century scoring 54 off 25 balls and became the man of the match.

Hooda scored his first double-century in first-class cricket playing for Baroda in the fourth round of the 2016–17 Ranji Trophy.

In 2016 IPL auction, Hooda was bought by Sunrisers Hyderabad for a price of 4.2 crores. He was retained ahead of 2017 auction but was released by the team after the 10th edition of IPL. In January 2018, he was bought by the Sunrisers Hyderabad in the 2018 IPL auction. He was released by the Sunrisers Hyderabad ahead of the 2020 IPL auction. In the 2020 IPL auction, he was bought by the Kings XI Punjab ahead of the 2020 Indian Premier League.

In the 2022 IPL auction, Hooda was bought by the Lucknow Super Giants for ₹5.75 crore. After spending two seasons with Lucknow Super Giants, he was released ahead of the 2025 IPL season.

In the 2025 IPL auction, he was brought by the Chennai Super Kings ahead of the 2025 Indian Premier League.

== International career ==
In November 2017, Hooda was named in India's squad for their Twenty20 International (T20I) series against Sri Lanka.

In February 2018, Hooda was named in India's Twenty20 International (T20I) squad for the 2018 Nidahas Trophy, but he did not play. In December 2018, he was named in India's team for the 2018 ACC Emerging Teams Asia Cup.

In January 2022, Hooda was named in India's One Day International (ODI) squad for their home series against the West Indies. He made his ODI debut against the West Indies in the first ODI of the same series. The following month, he was added to India's Twenty20 International (T20I) squad, also for their series against the West Indies. Also in February 2022, he was named in India's T20I squad for their series against Sri Lanka. He made his T20I debut on 24 February 2022, for India against Sri Lanka.

In June 2022, Hooda was named in India's squad for their T20I series against Ireland. In the second match of the series, Hooda went on to score his maiden T20I century. His partnership with Sanju Samson of 176 runs was the highest partnership for the second wicket in men's T20I and the highest partnership for any wicket for India.

He was also selected for India's squad for the 2022 ICC T20 World Cup.
