= Mansab Gill =

Canadian cricketer (born 1996)

Personal information
- Born: 30 December 1996 (age 29); Jalandhar, Punjab, India
- Batting: Right-handed
- Bowling: Right-arm off-break
- Role: All-Rounder

International information
- National side: Canada
- ODI debut (cap 111): 17 May 2025 v United States
- Last ODI: 25 May 2025 v United States
- Only T20I (cap 78): 23 April 2025 v Cayman Islands

Career statistics
Competition	ODI	T20I
Matches	4	1
Runs scored	122	15
Batting average	40.66	15.00
100s/50s	0/2	0/0
Top score	59	15
Catches/stumpings	0/0	1/0
- Source: Cricinfo

Mansab Gill is a Canadian cricketer.
