= Kartik Kakade =

Indian cricketer (born 1995)

Personal information
- Full name: Kartik Rajendrakumar Kakade
- Born: 25 July 1995 (age 31); Vadodara, Gujarat, India
- Source: ESPNcricinfo, 9 November 2017

Kartik Kakade (born 25 July 1995) is an Indian cricketer. He made his first-class debut for Baroda in the 2017–18 Ranji Trophy on 9 November 2017. He made his Twenty20 debut for Baroda in the 2018–19 Syed Mushtaq Ali Trophy on 2 March 2019. He made his List A debut on 20 February 2021, for Baroda in the 2020–21 Vijay Hazare Trophy.
