= Karsh Kothari =

Indian cricketer (born 1996)

Personal information
- Born: 29 February 1996 (age 30)
- Source: ESPNcricinfo, 17 November 2017

Karsh Kothari (born 29 February 1996) is an Indian cricketer. He made his first-class debut for Mumbai in the 2017–18 Ranji Trophy on 17 November 2017.
