= Dhruv Pratap Singh (cricketer) =

Indian cricketer (born 1997)

Personal information
- Born: 10 November 1997 (age 29); Allahabad, Uttar Pradesh, India

Domestic team information
- Years: Team
- 2016: Uttar Pradesh
- Source: ESPNcricinfo, 22 October 2016

Dhruv Pratap Singh (born 10 November 1997) is an Indian cricketer. He made his first-class debut for Uttar Pradesh in the 2016–17 Ranji Trophy on 20 October 2016.
