= Soaeb Tai =

Indian cricketer (born 1989)

Personal information
- Born: 25 December 1989 (age 36); Gujarat, India
- Source: Cricinfo, 10 January 2016

Soaeb Tai (born 25 December 1989) is an Indian cricketer who plays for Baroda. He made his Twenty20 debut on 3 January 2016 in the 2015–16 Syed Mushtaq Ali Trophy. He made his first-class debut for Baroda in the 2016–17 Ranji Trophy on 5 November 2016. He made his List A debut for Baroda in the 2016–17 Vijay Hazare Trophy on 25 February 2017.
