= P. Mansaram =

Indo-Canadian artist (1934–2020)

Panchal Mansaram (1934 – 6 December 2020), stylized as P. Mansaram, was an Indo-Canadian artist whose art is primarily collage-based. His prevalent use of mixed media collage is known as Mansamedia.

== Biography ==
P. Mansaram was born in 1934 in Mount Abu, Rajasthan, India. He studied at the Sir. J. J. School of Art in Mumbai from 1954 to 1959. He attended the Rijks Akademie in Amsterdam on a Dutch government scholarship from 1963 to 1964. He immigrated to Canada in 1966 with his wife Tarunika and his daughter Mila. They made acquaintance with noted philosopher Marshall McLuhan while in Toronto, which began a friendship between P. Mansaram and McLuhan that would lead to a collaborative art work that can be found in the Royal Ontario Museum.

Mansaram's art style evolved over his years of activity, but has retained an affinity for collage and photography. Ranging from silk screened photographic blue prints, pasted media on particle board and wood, to technologically created xerographic and lasergraphic works, all of Mansaram's works combine content and techniques to create unique works that are imbued with a dream-like quality of fragmented but connected thoughts. His series include Nepal, Calcutta by Night, Rear View Window, East West Intersect, Art on the Rocks, and Udaipur.

In 2014 the Royal Ontario Museum began a large-scale collection of Mansaram's art works, collecting over 700 pieces of art works, archives, print material, and photographs. The Royal Ontario Museum now holds the largest collection of P. Mansaram works in the world. They produced a documentary on the artist, and held a public presentation announcing their acquisition of his collection on 28 November 2017.

Mansaram's work is also in permanent collection of National Gallery of Canada and Art Gallery of Mississauga.

P. Mansaram: The Medium is the Medium is the Medium, a solo show curated by Indu Vashist and Toleen Touq, opened at the Art Museum at the University of Toronto, and toured to the Burlington Art Gallery and Surrey Art Gallery. Mansaram died on 6 December 2020 at the age of 86.
