= Vijay Halai =

Indian cricketer (born 1992)

Personal information
- Full name: Vijay Halai
- Born: 13 September 1992 (age 34); Bhuj, Gujarat, India
- Source: ESPNcricinfo, 13 November 2016

Vijay Halai (born 13 September 1992) is an Indian cricketer. He made his first-class debut for Baroda in the 2016–17 Ranji Trophy on 13 November 2016.
