= Chintan Gaja =

Indian cricketer (born 1994)

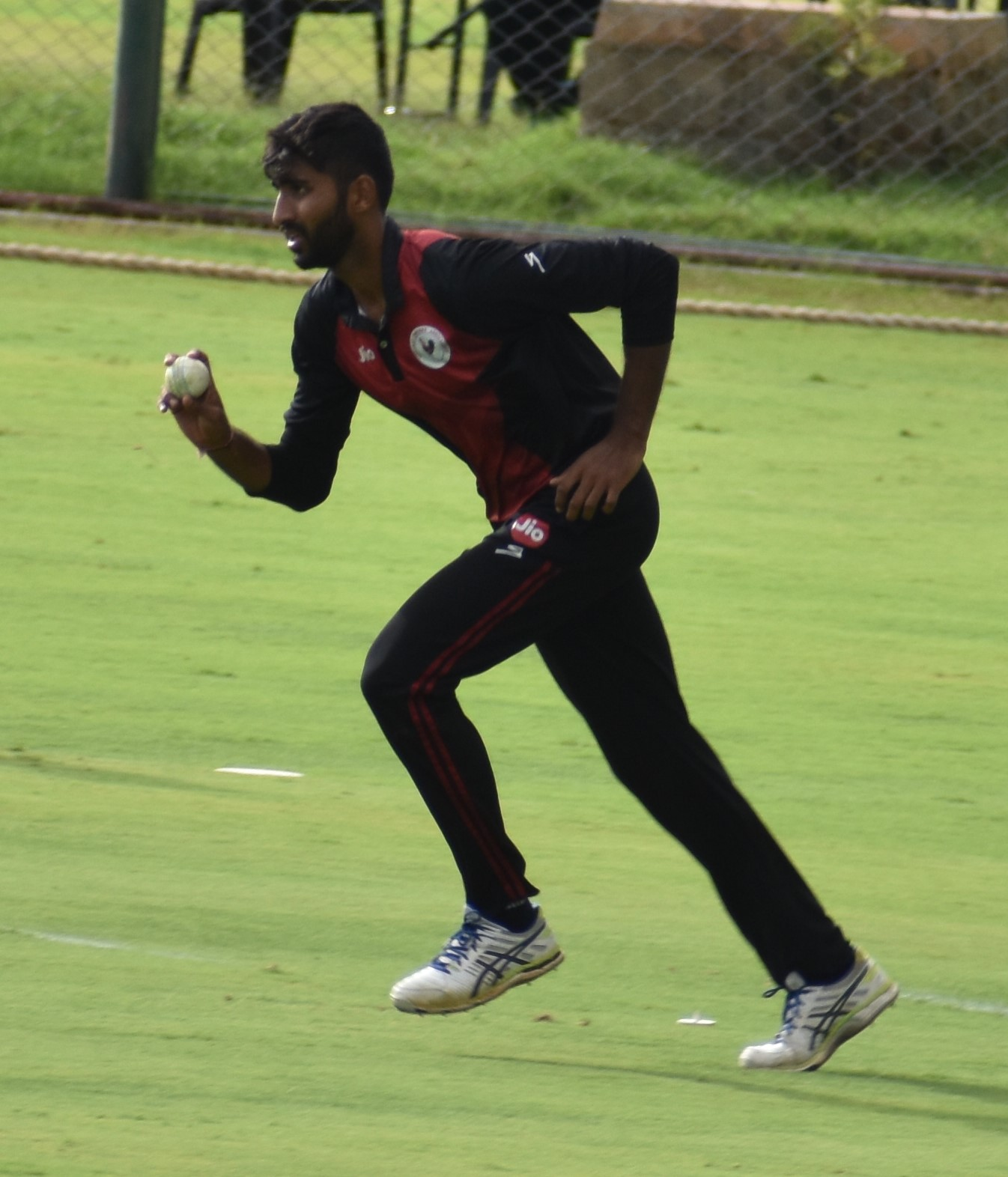
- Gaja during the 2019–20 Vijay Hazare Trophy

Personal information
- Born: 13 November 1994 (age 31); Ahmedabad, Gujarat, India
- Source: ESPNcricinfo, 27 October 2016

Chintan Gaja (born 13 November 1994) is an Indian cricketer. He made his first-class debut for Gujarat in the 2016–17 Ranji Trophy on 27 October 2016. He made his List A debut for Gujarat in the 2016–17 Vijay Hazare Trophy on 1 March 2017. In November 2017, in his ninth first-class match, he took 8 wickets for 40 runs in the first innings for Gujarat against Rajasthan in the 2017–18 Ranji Trophy.
