= Dhruv Raval =

Indian cricketer (born 1988)

Personal information
- Born: 20 September 1988 (age 38); Ahmedabad, Gujarat, India
- Batting: Left-handed
- Source: ESPNcricinfo, 29 November 2016

Dhruv Raval (born 20 September 1988) is an Indian first-class cricketer who plays for Gujarat. He made his List A debut on 27 February 2014, for Gujarat in the 2013–14 Vijay Hazare Trophy. He made his first-class debut for Gujarat in the 2016–17 Ranji Trophy on 29 November 2016. He made his Twenty20 debut for Gujarat in the 2016–17 Inter State Twenty-20 Tournament on 29 January 2017.
