= Hutatma Anant Kanhere Maidan =

Cricket ground in Maharashtra, India

Anant Kanhere Maidan
- Interactive map of Anant Kanhere Maidan
- Location: Nashik, Maharashtra
- Country: India
- Coordinates: 19.9950923°N 73.7745935°E
- Establishment: n/a
- Owner: Nashik Municipal Corporation
- Operator: Maharashtra Cricket Association
- Tenants: Maharashtra cricket team

Anant Kanhere Maidan is a cricket ground in Nashik, Maharashtra, India. Formerly the stadium was known as Golf Club Ground. The ground is named after Hutatma Anant Kanhere, who was a freedom-fighter from Nasik. The ground has facilities of jogging track, cricket stadium, and sports complex.

This was home ground for Maharashtra cricket team since the dispute over the Nehru Stadium in Pune until the new stadium was constructed in Pune.

== Events ==
The ground registered its first-class match between Maharashtra cricket team and Tamil Nadu cricket team in 2005/06 Ranji Trophy season and the match was full of entertainment as match was won the home team Maharashtra by 9 wickets.

In the 2008/09 season the match between Maharashtra cricket team and Tamil Nadu cricket team saw the triple century from Tamil Nadu's Abhinav Mukund and double century from Murali Vijay. Both were immediately drafted in Indian side and where Vijay made his debut.

The ground has hosted matches of Polly Umrigar Trophy, Vijay Merchant Trophy, CK Nayudu Trophy, and Cooch Behar Trophy since the 2003/04 season. The ground also hosted a match between Bangladesh and Maharashtra under-22s in September 2009. The included Bangladeshi stars like Rajin Saleh, Imrul Kayes, and Suhrawadi Shuvo etc.

The ground also hosted the semi-final of 2010/11 Ranji Trophy season between Maharashtra and Rajasthan. The match was drawn but Rajasthan won by first innings lead. The ground is one of the few grounds in India which has registered two or triple centuries.

== See also ==
- Maharashtra Cricket Association Stadium
- Nehru Stadium
