= Chirag Gandhi =

Indian cricketer

Personal information
- Full name: Chirag Jayeshkumar Gandhi
- Born: 18 June 1990 (age 36); Surat, Gujarat, India
- Batting: Right-handed
- Bowling: Right-arm offbreak
- Role: Batsman

Domestic team information
- Years: Team
- 2010/11–2023/24: Gujarat

Career statistics
Competition	FC	LA	T20
Matches	26	49	73
Runs scored	1,409	1,083	1,266
Batting average	41.44	30.94	30.87
100s/50s	1/10	1/4	0/7
Top score	169	100*	80
Balls bowled	60	12	–
Wickets	0	1	–
Bowling average	–	11.00	–
5 wickets in innings	–	0	–
10 wickets in match	–	0	–
Best bowling	–	1/8	–
Catches/stumpings	14/–	13/–	38/–
- Source: ESPNcricinfo, 7 May 2025

Chirag Jayeshkumar Gandhi (born 18 June 1990) is an Indian first-class cricketer who has played for Gujarat cricket team since 2011. He is a right-handed batsman and right arm off-break bowler.

== Early life ==
Gandhi was born on 18 June 1990 in Surat into a Gujarati Hindu family. He loved to play cricket from his early childhood. Considering his love for cricket, his father put him in a cricket coaching academy at the age of eight. His father always believed that Chirag can be a good cricketer so he inspired and supported him to make his career in cricket. Chirag Gandhi was raised in Surat and completed his schooling from MT Jariwala High School and in 2010, he has taken his B.com degree from SPB English Medium College of Commerce, Surat.

After graduation, he started his government job in department of Post in Surat and after working for three years, in 2014 he appointed in Income Tax department in Ahmedabad.

== Cricket career ==
Gandhi made his domestic limited-overs debut in February 2011, playing for Gujarat in the Vijay Hazare Trophy in Indore. He scored 21 in his debut innings against Bengal. He made his Twenty20 debut later that year against Baroda in the Syed Mushtaq Ali Trophy. His first-class debut came in a game against Mumbai in the Ranji Trophy in 2012–13.

On 26 January 2016, Gandhi scored a hundred against India B in the Deodhar Trophy.

Gandhi scored 169 runs with 22 fours and two sixes in the 2017 Irani Cup against Rest of India at Mumbai.
