= Hardik Patel (cricketer) =

Indian cricketer (born 1995)

Personal information
- Born: 8 May 1995 (age 31); Surat, Gujarat, India
- Batting: Left-handed
- Bowling: Slow left-arm orthodox
- Source: ESPNcricinfo, 1 November 2015

Hardik Patel (born 8 May 1995) is an Indian cricketer who plays for Gujarat.
