= Karan Patel (cricketer) =

Indian cricketer (born 1994)

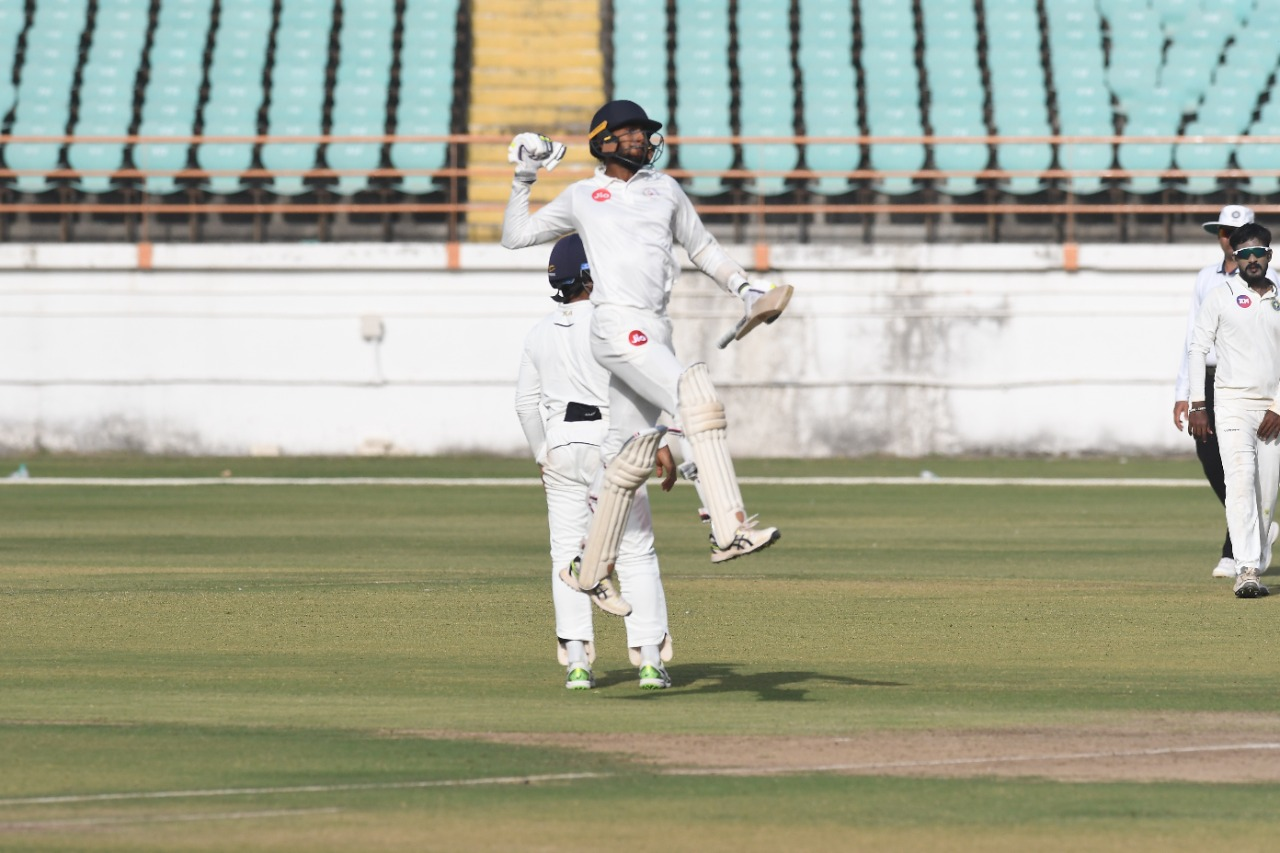

Personal information
- Full name: Karan Pravinbhai Patel
- Born: 30 September 1994 (age 31); Ahmedabad, Gujarat, India
- Batting: Right-handed
- Bowling: Right-arm off spin
- Role: All-rounder

Domestic team information
- Years: Team
- 2016–: Gujarat cricket team
- Source: ESPNcricinfo, 22 October 2016

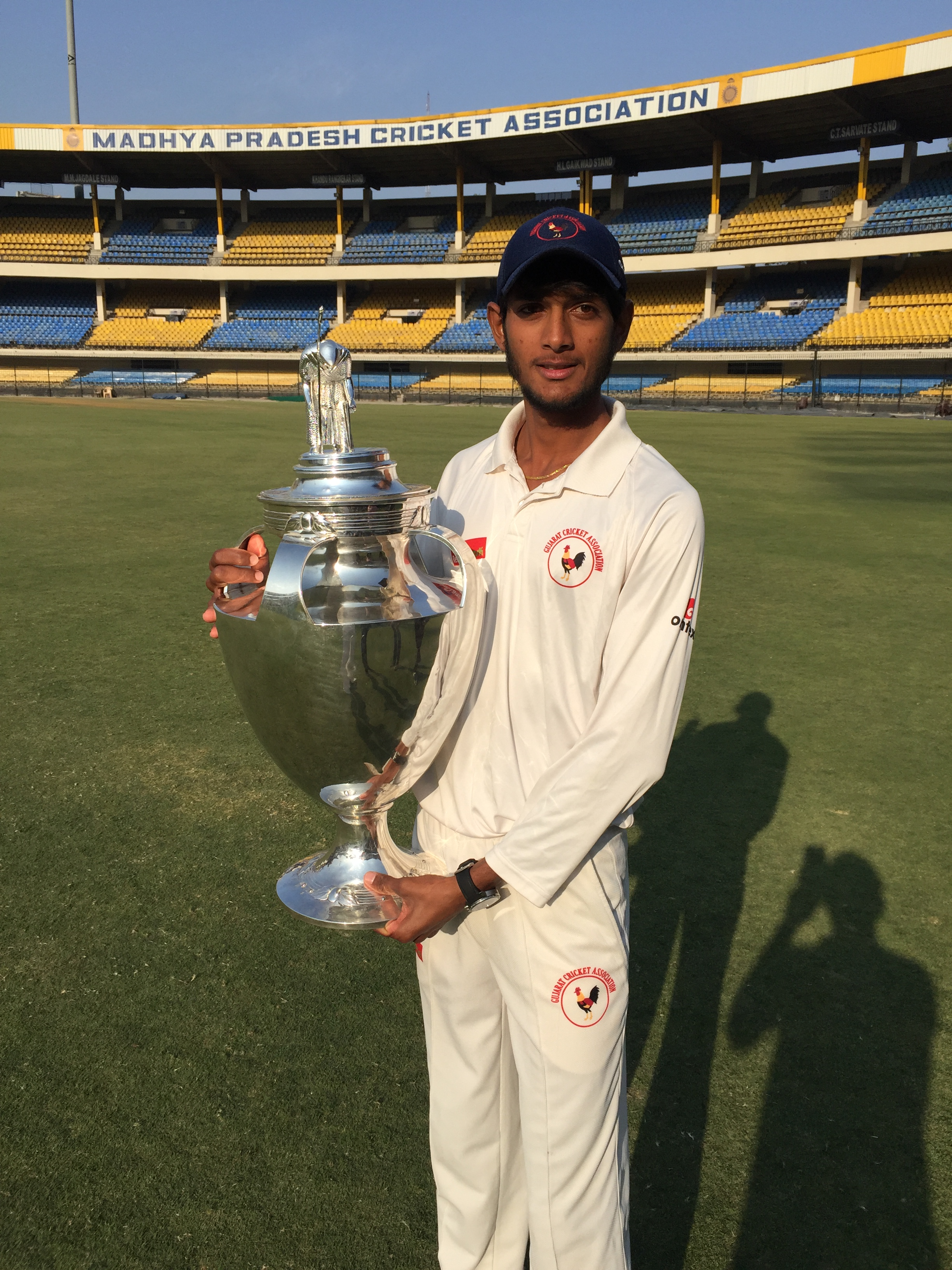
Karan Patel holding the Ranji Trophy

Karan Pravinbhai Patel (born 30 September 1994) is an Indian cricketer. He made his first-class debut for Gujarat in the 2016–17 Ranji Trophy on 20 October 2016. He made his Twenty20 debut for Gujarat in the 2016–17 Inter State Twenty-20 Tournament on 29 January 2017. He made his Irani Cup debut against Rest of India cricket team on 20 January 2017. He was a member of Gujarat Ranji Trophy Team which won their first ever title in 2016–17. He was also part of Vijay Hazare Trophy Team which won their first title in 2015–16.He made his maiden first-class century on 24 February against Kerala at Khanderi Stadium in Rajkot.
