= Krishnamoorthy Vignesh =

Indian cricketer (born 1994)

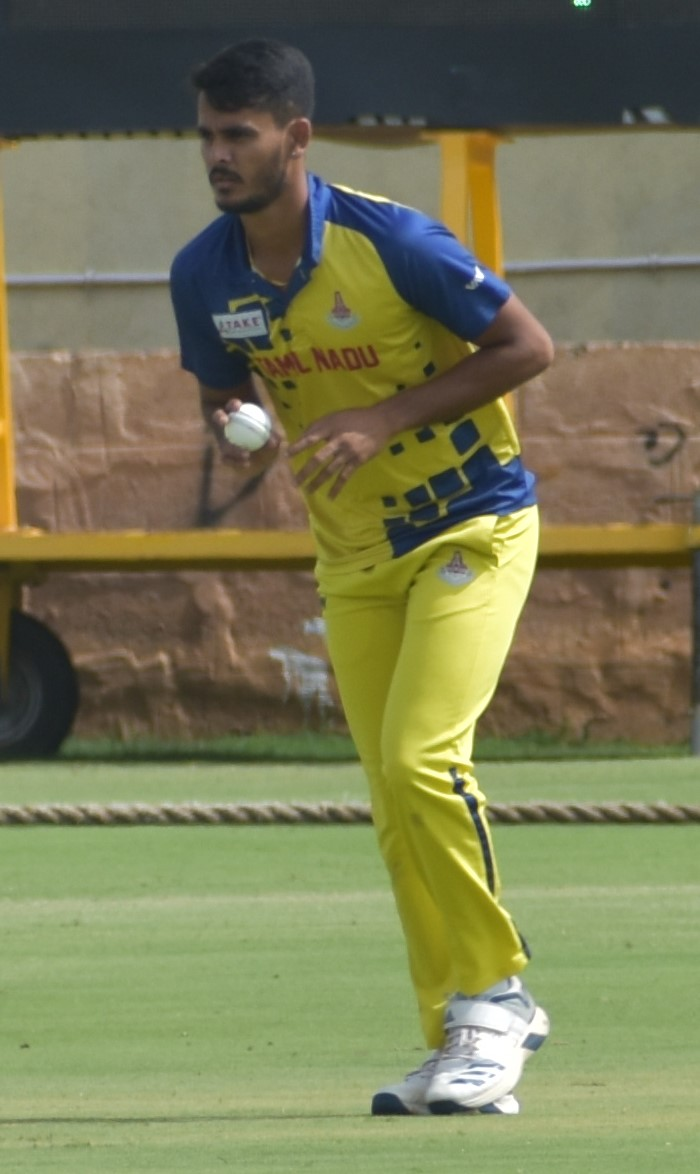
- Vignesh during the 2019–20 Vijay Hazare Trophy

Personal information
- Born: 9 September 1994 (age 32); Tiruvallur, Tamil Nadu, India
- Batting: Right-handed
- Bowling: Right-arm medium
- Role: Bowler

Domestic team information
- Years: Team
- 2013/14: Tamil Nadu
- Source: ESPNcricinfo, 6 October 2016

Krishnamoorthy Vignesh (born 9 September 1994) is an Indian cricketer. He made his List A debut on 2 March 2014, for Tamil Nadu in the 2013–14 Vijay Hazare Trophy. He made his first-class debut for Tamil Nadu in the 2016–17 Ranji Trophy on 6 October 2016. He made his Twenty20 debut for Tamil Nadu in the 2016–17 Inter State Twenty-20 Tournament on 29 January 2017.

He was the leading wicket-taker for Tamil Nadu in the 2017–18 Ranji Trophy, with 24 dismissals in six matches. In July 2018, he was named in the squad for India Green for the 2018–19 Duleep Trophy. He was the leading wicket-taker for India Green in the tournament, with eight dismissals in two matches.
