= Akhil Herwadkar =

Indian cricketer (born 1994)

Akhil Herwadakar
Personal information
- Full name: Akhil Arvind Herwadkar
- Born: 31 October 1994 (age 32); Sangli, Maharashtra, India
- Batting: Left-handed
- Bowling: Right-arm off break
- Role: Opening batsman

Domestic team information
- Years: Team
- 2011/12–2020/21: Mumbai
- 2021/22: Chhattisgarh

Akhil Arvind Herwadkar (born 31 October 1994) is an Indian former cricketer who plays as an opening batsman for Mumbai and Chhattisgarh. Herwadkar is a left-hand batsman and off-break bowler. He played for Mumbai Under-19s and was a member of the Indian Under-19 World Cup squads of 2012 and 2014.

Herwadkar was born in Sangli. He hails from a small town Jaysingpur near Sangli. He came to a training camp in Pune as an 11-year-old. He made his first-class debut for Mumbai, at the age of 17, on 29 November 2011 against Orissa and scored 11 runs in that match.
