= Vijay Gohil =

Indian cricketer (born 1995)

Personal information
- Born: 13 October 1995 (age 31); Mumbai, India
- Bowling: Left-arm
- Role: Slow left-arm spinner
- Source: ESPNcricinfo, 6 October 2016

Vijay Gohil (born 13 October 1995) is an Indian cricketer. He made his first-class debut for Mumbai in the 2016–17 Ranji Trophy on 6 October 2016. He made his List A debut for Mumbai in the 2018–19 Vijay Hazare Trophy on 19 September 2018.
