= Samit Gohel =

Indian cricketer (born 1990)

Personal information
- Full name: Samit Bhanubhai Gohel
- Born: 13 September 1990 (age 36); Anand, Gujarat, India
- Batting: Right-handed
- Bowling: Slow left-arm orthodox
- Role: Batsman

International information
- National side: Canada (2026-present)
- Only ODI (cap 124): 11 October 2026 v Nepal

Domestic team information
- Years: Team
- 2012–2020: Gujarat
- 2021-present: Tripura

Career statistics
Competition	First-class
Matches	28
Runs scored	1,775
Batting average	41.27
100s/50s	3/10
Top score	359*
Balls bowled	114
Wickets	2
Bowling average	31.00
5 wickets in innings	0
10 wickets in match	0
Best bowling	2/27
Catches/stumpings	42/–
- Source: Cricinfo, 11 October 2026

Samit Gohel (born 13 September 1990) is an Indian-born Canadian cricketer who plays for Canadian national cricket team. He made his ODI debut against Nepal on 11 October 2026.

In the quarter-final match of the 2016–17 Ranji Trophy against Odisha, Gohel scored 359 not out, the highest total for someone carrying their bat in first-class cricket. His innings was the highest individual score in first-class cricket during the 2010s, and is the highest by an Indian in first-class cricket since M. V. Sridhar's knock of 366 in 1994.

He made his List A debut for Gujarat in the 2016–17 Vijay Hazare Trophy on 28 February 2017. He made his Twenty20 debut on 4 November 2021, for Tripura in the 2021–22 Syed Mushtaq Ali Trophy.

== See also ==
- List of Ranji Trophy triple centuries
