= Priyank Panchal =

Indian cricketer (born 1990)

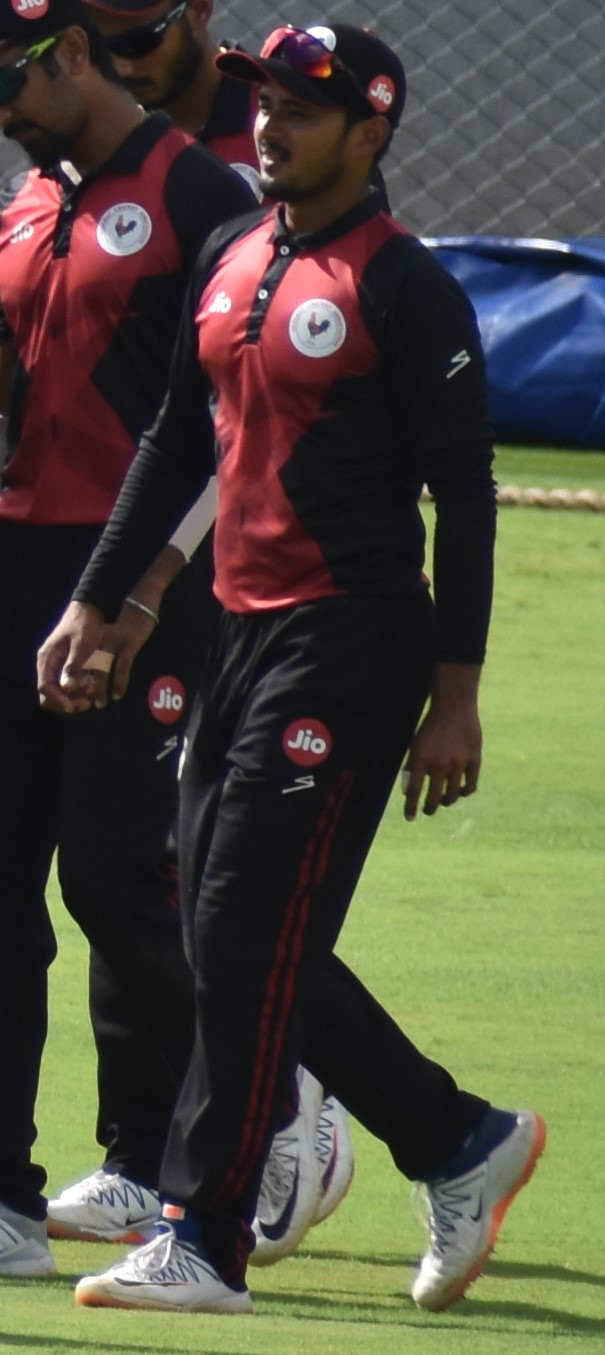
- Panchal during the 2019-20 Vijay Hazare Trophy

Personal information
- Full name: Priyank Kirit Panchal
- Born: 9 April 1990 (age 36); Ahmedabad, Gujarat, India
- Batting: Right-handed
- Bowling: Right-arm medium
- Role: Opening batter

Domestic team information
- Years: Team
- 2008–2025: Gujarat
- FC debut: 3 November 2008 Gujarat v Saurashtra
- LA debut: 27 February 2008 Gujarat v Maharashtra

Career statistics
Competition	FC	LA	T20
Matches	127	97	59
Runs scored	8,856	3,672	1,522
Batting average	45.18	40.80	28.71
100s/50s	29/34	8/21	0/9
Top score	314*	136	79
Balls bowled	1,698	190	66
Wickets	16	4	4
Bowling average	49.25	36.75	20.75
5 wickets in innings	0	0	0
10 wickets in match	0	0	0
Best bowling	3/0	1/0	4/19
Catches/stumpings	98/–	62/–	30/–
- Source: Cricinfo, 31 March 2025

Priyank Kiritbhai Panchal (born 9 April 1990) is an Indian former cricketer. He played for Gujarat primarily as a right-handed opening batsman. He was born in Ahmedabad.

== Career ==
Panchal made his first cricketing appearance for the Under-15s in the 2003–04 Polly Umrigar Trophy, in which he played for two seasons. He stepped up to the Under-17s team, for whom, in his last fixture of the 2005–06 Vijay Merchant Trophy, he scored a century. The following season, he played in both the limited-overs competition and the three-day game.

On 27 February 2008, he made his List-A debut against Maharashtra in the Vijay Hazare Trophy, playing for Gujarat, where he scored 123 runs in 115 balls with the help of 17 fours and 1 six.

Panchal made his first-class debut in the Ranji Trophy competition the following season, against Saurashtra, in a game which Gujarat won by an innings margin.

In November 2016, Panchal became the first player to score a triple century for Gujarat. The following month, he became the first player for Gujarat to score 1,000 runs in a single Ranji Trophy season. He finished the 2016–17 Ranji Trophy season with the most runs in the competition, with a total of 1,310 from ten matches and seventeen innings.

He was the leading run-scorer for Gujarat in the 2017–18 Ranji Trophy, with 542 runs in seven matches. In July 2018, he was named in the squad for India Green for the 2018–19 Duleep Trophy. He was also the leading run-scorer for Gujarat in the 2018–19 Vijay Hazare Trophy, with 367 runs in eight matches. He was the leading run-scorer for Gujarat in the group-stage of the 2018–19 Ranji Trophy, with 898 runs in nine matches. He finished the tournament with 898 runs in nine matches.

In August 2019, he was named as the captain of the India Red team for the 2019–20 Duleep Trophy. In October 2019, he was named in India B's squad for the 2019–20 Deodhar Trophy.

In January 2021, he was named as one of five standby players in India's Test squad for their series against England. In November 2021, he was named as captain of the India A team for their tour of South Africa. In December 2021, he was named in India's squad for Test series versus South Africa, replacing Rohit Sharma, who was suffering from hamstring injury. In February 2022, he was named in India's Test squad for their series against Sri Lanka. He was close to making his debut during the 2021-22 South Africa tour but didn't get the chance to wear the national cap.

In May 2025, Panchal announced his retirement from all forms of cricket.

== See also ==
- List of Ranji Trophy triple centuries
