= Abhinav Mukund =

Indian cricketer

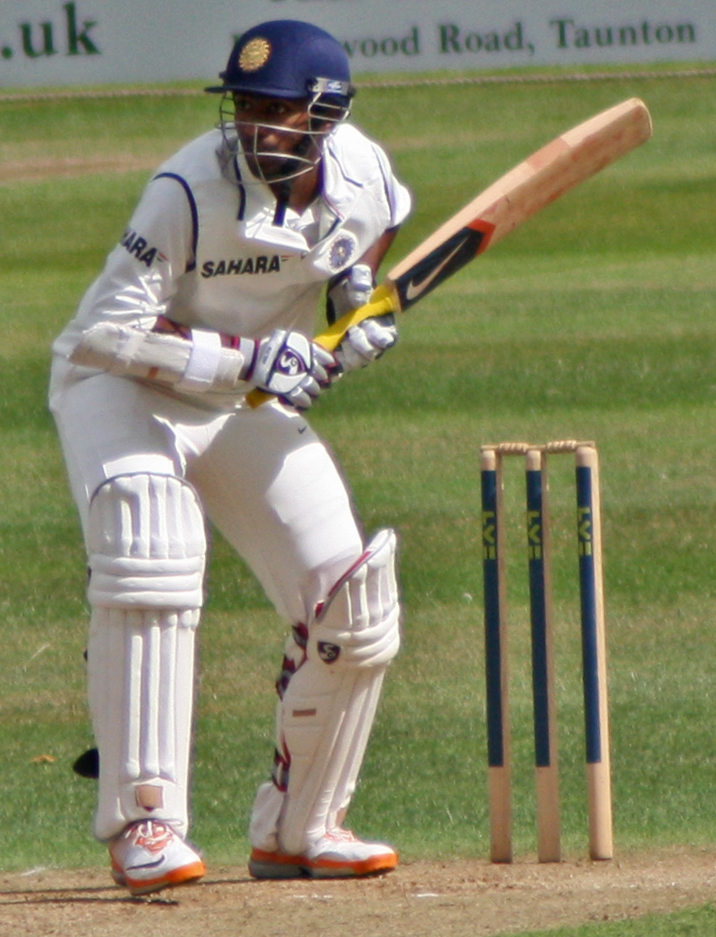
- Mukund in 2011

Personal information
- Born: 6 January 1990 (age 36); Chennai, Tamil Nadu, India
- Batting: Left-handed
- Bowling: Right-arm leg break, googly
- Role: Opening batter

International information
- National side: India (2011–2017)
- Test debut (cap 268): 20 June 2011 v West Indies
- Last Test: 26 July 2017 v Sri Lanka

Domestic team information
- Years: Team
- 2007–present: Tamil Nadu
- 2008–2012: Chennai Super Kings
- 2013: Royal Challengers Bangalore

Career statistics
| Competition | Test | FC | LA | T20 |
|---|---|---|---|---|
| Matches | 7 | 145 | 84 | 35 |
| Runs scored | 320 | 10,258 | 4,163 | 728 |
| Batting average | 22.85 | 47.93 | 52.03 | 26.96 |
| 100s/50s | 0/2 | 31/37 | 12/24 | 0/3 |
| Top score | 81 | 300* | 147 | 68* |
| Balls bowled | 12 | 1,041 | 206 | 105 |
| Wickets | 0 | 16 | 4 | 11 |
| Bowling average | – | 37.93 | 44.75 | 9.18 |
| 5 wickets in innings | – | 0 | 0 | 0 |
| 10 wickets in match | – | 0 | 0 | 0 |
| Best bowling | – | 3/23 | 1/0 | 3/22 |
| Catches/stumpings | 6/– | 90/– | 37/– | 21/– |
- Source: ESPNcricinfo, 17 March 2025

Abhinav Mukund (born 6 January 1990) is an Indian Former cricketer who plays domestic cricket for Tamil Nadu. He has played for India in seven Test matches. He has captained Tamil Nadu and India A on several occasions. He was a member of Chennai Super Kings and Royal Challengers Bangalore in the IPL.

== Career ==
He was picked for the India Under-19 squad's tour in Malaysia where he played two matches. His highest score in first-class cricket is 300* against Maharashtra. He and Murali Vijay scored 462 runs for the first wicket partnership in the same match. He was named in the Indian Test squad for the tour of the West Indies in 2011 and then for the tour of England.

On 1 October 2015, at the age of 25, Abhinav made his 100th First class appearance against Baroda.

In September 2016 Abhinav was picked as the main opener as part of the Albert TUTI Patriots team in the inaugural Tamil Nadu Premier League Tournament, Patriots went on to win the tournament with Abhinav top scoring in the final with 82 not out.

On 9 February 2017, Abhinav was included in the Indian Test team for one match against Bangladesh. Abhinav was part of the Indian Test squad for Australia's tour of India in February and March 2017. He played a test match against them in Bengaluru in the absence of Murali Vijay. Abhinav was also in the squad for India's tour of Sri Lanka which started from July 2017 and played the lone test at Galle where he scored 12 and 81. Abhinav is a former captain of the Tamil Nadu Ranji Trophy Team.

In July 2018, he was named the captain of the India Red team for the 2018–19 Duleep Trophy. He was the leading run-scorer in the 2018–19 Vijay Hazare Trophy, with 560 runs in nine matches. In October 2018, he was named in India C's squad for the 2018–19 Deodhar Trophy.
