= 2016–17 Hyderabad C.A. season =

Hyderabad C.A.
2016–17 season
- Coach: Bharat Arun (Senior men's); Purnima Rao (Senior women's)
- Captain: S Badrinath (Senior men's); Gouher Sultana (Senior women's)
- Ground(s): Rajiv Gandhi International Cricket Stadium, Hyderabad (Capacity: 55,000)
- One-Day League: Elite Group A (4th)
- Ranji Trophy: Quarter-finals (Promoted)
- T20 League: Runners-up
- Inter State Twenty-20 Tournament: South Zone (3rd)
- Vijay Hazare Trophy: Group D (3rd)

The 2016–17 season is Hyderabad cricket team's 83rd competitive season. The Hyderabad cricket team and Hyderabad women's cricket team are senior men's and women's domestic cricket teams based in the city of Hyderabad, India, run by the Hyderabad Cricket Association. They represent the state of Telangana in domestic competitions.

== Competition overview ==
Category	Competition	Format	First match	Last match	Final position	Pld	W	L	D / T / NR	Win %
Senior women's	One-Day League	Women's List A cricket	1 October 2016	10 October 2016	Elite Group Stage	4	1	2	1	25%
Senior men's	Ranji Trophy	First-class cricket	6 October 2016	23 December 2016	Quarter-finals, Promoted to Group A / B	10	4	2	4	40%
Senior women's	T20 League	Women's Twenty20 cricket	2 January 2017	13 January 2017	Runners-up	7	4	3	0	57.14%
Senior men's	Inter State Twenty-20	Twenty20 cricket	29 January 2017	3 February 2017	Zonal Stage	5	3	2	0	60%
Senior men's	Vijay Hazare Trophy	List A cricket	25 February 2017	6 March 2017	Group Stage	6	4	2	0	66.67%

== Senior Men's team ==
=== Squads ===
- Head coach: Bharat Arun
- Assistant coach : Zakir Hussain
- Fielding Coach : C Dayanand
- Physio : Prasanth Panchada
- Trainer : Naveen Reddy
- Video analyst : Vinay Elkaturi

Buchi Babu Tournament	Ranji Trophy	Inter State T-20 Tournament	Vijay Hazare Trophy
Ashish Reddy (c); Akshath Reddy; Tanmay Agarwal; Balchander Anirudh; Bavanaka Sandeep; Kolla Sumanth (wk); Mehdi Hasan; Vishal Sharma; Akash Bhandari; Chama Milind; Ravi Kiran; Mohammed Siraj; Danny Dereck Prince; Benjamin Thomas; Yathin Reddy; Habeeb Ahmed (wk)	S Badrinath (c); Habeeb Ahmed; Vishal Sharma; Himalay Agarwal; Tanmay Agarwal; Balchander Anirudh; Akash Bhandari; Mehdi Hasan; Chama Milind; Mohammad Muddassir; Mohammed Siraj; Ravi Kiran; Akshath Reddy; Bavanaka Sandeep; Kolla Sumanth (wk); Benjamin Thomas	S Badrinath (c); Himalay Agarwal; Tanmay Agarwal; Annabathula Akash; Balchander Anirudh; Akash Bhandari; Mehdi Hasan; Chama Milind; Mohammed Siraj; Sharadh Mudiraj (wk); Ravi Kiran; Ravi Teja; Akshath Reddy; Palakodeti Sairam; Bavanaka Sandeep; Kolla Sumanth (wk)	S Badrinath (c); Himalay Agarwal; Tanmay Agarwal; Balchander Anirudh; Akash Bhandari; Mehdi Hasan; Chama Milind; Mohammad Muddassir; Mohammed Siraj; Sharadh Mudiraj (wk); Ravi Kiran; Akshath Reddy; Rohit Rayudu; Bavanaka Sandeep; Kolla Sumanth (wk); Tanay Thyagarajan

S Badrinath moved from the Tamil Nadu to lead the Hyderabad while Hanuma Vihari and Dwaraka Ravi Teja moved from the Hyderabad to the Andhra ahead of the 2016–17 season. The Hyderabad team also got the new coach with Bharat Arun replacing Abdul Azeem.

Irani Cup

Mohammad Siraj got selected for Rest of India squad for 2016-17 Irani Cup, a first-class cricket competition in India.

Syed Mushtaq Ali Trophy

Tanmay Agarwal and Chama Milind got selected for South Zone squad for 2016-17 Syed Mushtaq Ali Trophy, a domestic Twenty20 (T20) cricket tournament in India.

Deodhar Trophy

Chama Milind got selected for India B squad for 2016-17 Deodhar Trophy, a List A cricket competition in India.

Indian Premier League

Chama Milind was retained by Delhi Daredevils while local franchise, SunRisers Hyderabad picked Tanmay Agarwal and Mohammad Siraj in the IPL Auction for 2017 Indian Premier League season.

=== Buchi Babu Tournament ===
Hyderabad was invited for 2016–17 Kalpathi AGS - Buchi Babu Invitational Tournament, invitational tournament conducted annually by Tamil Nadu Cricket Association in the honour of M. Buchi Babu Naidu and began their campaign against Baroda at Chennai on 5 August 2016. They finished inside top-2 with two wins and a loss in Group B to advance to knockout stage but lost to TNCA Presidents XI in semifinal by 24 runs.

==== Points Table ====
Group B

Team	Pld	W	L	T	NR	Pts	NRR
TNCA Districts XI	3	2	1	0	0	8	+0.051
Hyderabad	3	2	1	0	0	8	-0.016
Railways	3	1	2	0	0	4	-0.212
TNCA XI	3	1	2	0	0	4	-0.333

- Top two teams advanced to the knockout stage.

==== Matches ====
Group Stage

5 August 2016	TNCA XI; 419/3 (90 overs)	v	Hyderabad; 255 (77 overs)	TNCA XI won by 164 runs
09:00 IST; Scorecard	TNCA XI; 419/3 (90 overs)	v	Hyderabad; 255 (77 overs)	CPT-IP Turf, Chennai; Umpires: Jayaraman Madanagopal and R Satish Kumar
09:00 IST; Scorecard	K Mukunth 136 (200); Ravi Kiran 1/32 (9 overs)		Bavanaka Sandeep 115* (185); Krishnamoorthy Vignesh 3/17 (10 overs)	CPT-IP Turf, Chennai; Umpires: Jayaraman Madanagopal and R Satish Kumar
TNCA XI won the toss and elected to bat.				CPT-IP Turf, Chennai; Umpires: Jayaraman Madanagopal and R Satish Kumar

8 August 2016	Hyderabad; 409 (89 overs)	v	TNCA Districts XI; 329 (82.3 overs)	Hyderabad won by 80 runs
09:00 IST; Scorecard	Hyderabad; 409 (89 overs)	v	TNCA Districts XI; 329 (82.3 overs)	SSN College Ground, Chennai; Umpires: G Ramesh and M Ashwin Kumar
09:00 IST; Scorecard	Akshath Reddy 123 (123); S Ashwath 3/42 (12 overs)		C Hari Nishaanth 65 (91); Mohammad Siraj 3/49 (15 overs)	SSN College Ground, Chennai; Umpires: G Ramesh and M Ashwin Kumar
TNCA Districts XI won the toss and elected to field.				SSN College Ground, Chennai; Umpires: G Ramesh and M Ashwin Kumar

11 August 2016	Hyderabad; 294 (86 overs)	v	Railways; 248 (84.5 overs)	Hyderabad won by 46 runs
09:00 IST; Scorecard	Hyderabad; 294 (86 overs)	v	Railways; 248 (84.5 overs)	MRF Pachyappas Ground, Chennai; Umpires: G S Anantharamakrishnan and M Karthik
09:00 IST; Scorecard	Akshath Reddy 87 (149); Avinash Yadav 4/72 (18 overs)		Arindam Ghosh 55 (117); Akash Bhandari 5/52 (22 overs)	MRF Pachyappas Ground, Chennai; Umpires: G S Anantharamakrishnan and M Karthik
Hyderabad won the toss and elected to bat.				MRF Pachyappas Ground, Chennai; Umpires: G S Anantharamakrishnan and M Karthik

Semi-final

14 August 2016	TNCA Presidents XI; 280 (87.4 overs)	v	Hyderabad; 256 (72.2 overs)	TNCA Presidents XI won by 24 runs
09:00 IST; Scorecard	TNCA Presidents XI; 280 (87.4 overs)	v	Hyderabad; 256 (72.2 overs)	SSN College Ground, Chennai; Umpires: M G Saidharshan Kumar and G S Anantharamakrishnan
09:00 IST; Scorecard	Dinesh Karthik 115 (164); Mohammad Siraj 3/54 (19.4 overs)		Kolla Sumanth 108 (163); M. Mohammed 6/92 (20 overs)	SSN College Ground, Chennai; Umpires: M G Saidharshan Kumar and G S Anantharamakrishnan
Hyderabad won the toss and elected to field.				SSN College Ground, Chennai; Umpires: M G Saidharshan Kumar and G S Anantharamakrishnan

==== Statistics ====
Most runs

Player	Mat	Inns	Runs	Ave	SR	HS	100	50
Akshath Reddy	4	4	242	60.50	77.32	123	1	1
Kolla Sumanth	4	4	228	57.00	61.46	109	2	0
Ashish Reddy	4	4	126	31.50	70	65	0	1

Most wickets

Player	Mat	Inns	Wkts	Ave	Econ	BBI	SR	4WI	5WI
Akash Bhandari	4	4	9	33.89	4.07	5/52	50	0	1
Mehdi Hasan	4	4	9	37	3.16	3/72	70.22	0	0
Mohammad Siraj	4	4	6	20	2.57	3/49	46.67	0	0

=== Ranji Trophy ===
Hyderabad began their campaign in Ranji Trophy, the premier first-class cricket tournament in India, against Goa at Nagpur on 6 October 2016. They finished inside top-2 of Group C with four wins, three draws and a loss to advance to knockout stage and get promoted to Group A/B for 2017-18 Ranji Trophy. They were eliminated in Quarter-finals where Mumbai defeated Hyderabad by 30 runs.

==== Points table ====
Group C

Team	Pld	W	L	D	A	Pts	NRR
Hyderabad	9	4	1	3	1	31	–0.117
Haryana	9	3	1	5	0	31	+0.218
Andhra	9	3	1	5	0	28	+0.119
Himachal Pradesh	9	3	0	6	0	26	+0.664
Kerala	9	1	1	7	0	25	+0.206
Goa	9	2	3	4	0	18	–0.330
Services	9	1	2	6	0	16	–0.177
Jammu & Kashmir	9	1	3	5	0	15	–0.383
Chhattisgarh	9	1	4	4	0	14	–0.011
Tripura	9	1	4	3	1	14	–0.196

- Top two teams advanced to knockout stage and promoted to Group A / B for 2017–18 Ranji Trophy.

==== Knockout stage ====
Quarterfinals
A1	Mumbai	294 & 217
C1	Hyderabad	280 & 201
A3	Tamil Nadu	152 & 87/3
B2	Karnataka	88 & 150
A2	Gujarat	263 & 641
B3	Odisha	199 & 81/1
C2	Haryana	258 & 262
B1	Jharkhand	345 & 178/5

Semifinals
A1	Mumbai	411 & 251/4
A3	Tamil Nadu	305 & 356/6d
A2	Gujarat	390 & 252
B1	Jharkhand	408 & 111

Final
A1	Mumbai	228 & 411
A2	Gujarat	328 & 313/5

==== Matches ====
Group Stage

6–9 October 2016	Goa	v	Hyderabad	Hyderabad won by 9 wickets
Scorecard	164 (74 overs); Saurabh Bandekar 59 (144); Mohammed Siraj 4/14 (15 overs)		388 (130 overs); Akshath Reddy 128 (222); Amit Yadav 3/73 (22 overs)	Vidarbha Cricket Association Stadium, Nagpur; Umpires: Krishnamachari Bharatan and Rohan Pandit; Player of the match: Bavanaka Sandeep (Hyderabad)
Scorecard	258 (86.1 overs); Sagun Kamat 55 (73); Ravi Kiran 3/40 (15.1 overs)		35/1 (5 overs); Tanmay Agarwal 27* (22); Saurabh Bandekar 1/15 (2 overs)	Vidarbha Cricket Association Stadium, Nagpur; Umpires: Krishnamachari Bharatan and Rohan Pandit; Player of the match: Bavanaka Sandeep (Hyderabad)
Goa won the toss and elected to bat.

13–16 October 2016	Hyderabad	v	Haryana	Haryana won by 8 wickets
Scorecard	191 (82.5 overs); Bavanaka Sandeep 44 (120); Yuzvendra Chahal 6/44 (27 overs)		331 (130.4 overs); Chaitanya Bishnoi 73 (202); Mehdi Hasan 6/93 (40.4 overs)	Keenan Stadium, Jamshedpur; Umpires: Rajesh Deshpande and Tapan Sharma; Player of the match: Yuzvendra Chahal (Haryana)
Scorecard	224 (83.5 overs); Chama Milind 66* (114); Mohit Sharma 5/26 (14 overs)		85/2 (16.4 overs); Nitin Saini 45 (59); Mohammed Siraj 1/18 (3 overs)	Keenan Stadium, Jamshedpur; Umpires: Rajesh Deshpande and Tapan Sharma; Player of the match: Yuzvendra Chahal (Haryana)
Hyderabad won the toss and elected to bat.

20–23 October 2016	Kerala	v	Hyderabad	Match Drawn Kerala took first innings lead
Scorecard	517/9d (181 overs); Iqbal Abdulla 159* (217); Mehdi Hasan 3/134 (54 overs)		281 (97.3 overs); Mehdi Hasan 58 (114); Karaparambil Monish 3/56 (22.3 overs)	KIIT Stadium, Bhubaneswar; Umpires: Ulhas Gandhe and Sanjay Hazare; Player of the match: Iqbal Abdulla (Kerala)
Scorecard			220/3 (69 overs) (f/o); Balchander Anirudh 120* (192); Iqbal Abdulla 1/37 (12.5 overs)	KIIT Stadium, Bhubaneswar; Umpires: Ulhas Gandhe and Sanjay Hazare; Player of the match: Iqbal Abdulla (Kerala)
Kerala won the toss and elected to bat.

27–30 October 2016	Himachal Pradesh	v	Hyderabad	Match Drawn Hyderabad took first innings lead
Scorecard	36 (25 overs); Rishi Dhawan 9 (16); Akash Bhandari 4/0 (3 overs)		126 (55.2 overs); Balchander Anirudh 64 (162); Rishi Dhawan 7/50 (22 overs)	Barsapara Cricket Stadium, Guwahati; Umpires: Sanjay Hazare and Nikhil Patwardhan; Player of the match: Balchander Anirudh (Hyderabad)
Scorecard	301 (86.3 overs); Robin Bist 84* (171); Mohammed Siraj 3/50 (18 overs)		200/6 (54 overs); Kolla Sumanth 67 (108); Pankaj Jaiswal 3/49 (9 overs)	Barsapara Cricket Stadium, Guwahati; Umpires: Sanjay Hazare and Nikhil Patwardhan; Player of the match: Balchander Anirudh (Hyderabad)
Hyderabad won the toss and elected to field.; Benjamin Thomas (Hyderabad) made his first-class debut.; Himachal Pradesh made their lowest total in the Ranji Trophy.

5–8 November 2016	Hyderabad	v	Tripura	Match Abandoned
Scorecard				Karnail Singh Stadium, Delhi; Umpires: Sanjeev Dua and Pashchim Pathak
Smog pollution prevented any play from taking place.; The BCCI originally rescheduled the match to take place after the conclusion of the group stage. However, this decision was revoked in December 2016, with both teams being awarded one point each.

13–16 November 2016	Hyderabad	v	Services	Hyderabad won by 10 wickets
Scorecard	580/9d (156.5 overs); Bavanaka Sandeep 203* (332); Raushan Raj 5/73 (27.5 overs)		360 (106.5 overs); Shamsher Yadav 104 (196); Mohammed Siraj 3/65 (21.5 overs)	Bandra Kurla Complex Ground, Mumbai; Umpires: Nitin Pandit and Rohan Pandit; Player of the match: Bavanaka Sandeep (Hyderabad)
Scorecard	20/0 (4.5 overs); Akshath Reddy 15* (15)		239 (72.1 overs) (f/o); Rahul Singh 59 (67); Ravi Kiran 4/32 (17 overs)	Bandra Kurla Complex Ground, Mumbai; Umpires: Nitin Pandit and Rohan Pandit; Player of the match: Bavanaka Sandeep (Hyderabad)
Services won the toss and elected to field.; This fixture was originally scheduled to be held in Delhi, but was moved due to concerns about smog pollution.

21–24 November 2016	Hyderabad	v	Chhattisgarh	Hyderabad won by 44 runs
Scorecard	351 (127.3 overs); S Badrinath 134 (254); Pankaj Rao 5/89 (36.3 overs)		188 (85.1 overs); Sahil Gupta 55 (138); Akash Bhandari 3/27 (8.1 overs)	Sardar Vallabhbhai Patel Stadium, Valsad; Umpires: Umesh Dubey and Amiesh Saheba; Player of the match: Pankaj Rao (Chhattisgarh)
Scorecard	122 (48.2 overs); Akash Bhandari 35 (51); Pankaj Rao 5/44 (16.2 overs)		241 (84.1 overs); Ashutosh Singh 67 (144); Ravi Kiran 4/60 (20 overs)	Sardar Vallabhbhai Patel Stadium, Valsad; Umpires: Umesh Dubey and Amiesh Saheba; Player of the match: Pankaj Rao (Chhattisgarh)
Chhattisgarh won the toss and elected to field.

29 November – 2 December 2016	Hyderabad	v	Jammu & Kashmir	Hyderabad won by 286 runs
Scorecard	328 (131.3 overs); Tanmay Agarwal 119 (321); Parvez Rasool 4/63 (43.3 overs)		169 (55.3 overs); Parvez Rasool 70 (81); Ravi Kiran 4/32 (15 overs)	Moti Bagh Stadium, Vadodara; Umpires: Kamlesh Sharma and Tapan Sharma; Player of the match: Tanmay Agarwal (Hyderabad)
Scorecard	244/2d (57 overs); Tanmay Agarwal 103* (183); Samiullah Beigh 1/57 (12 overs)		117 (37.2 overs); Ram Dayal 33 (71); Chama Milind 4/39 (12 overs)	Moti Bagh Stadium, Vadodara; Umpires: Kamlesh Sharma and Tapan Sharma; Player of the match: Tanmay Agarwal (Hyderabad)
Jammu & Kashmir won the toss and elected to field.; Ahmed Bandy and Suhail Andleev (Jammu & Kashmir) both made their first-class debuts.

7–10 December 2016	Andhra	v	Hyderabad	Match Drawn Andhra took first innings lead
Scorecard	190 (59 overs); Manyala Pranith 63 (88); Chama Milind 5/28 (16 overs)		143 (74.5 overs); Chama Milind 29* (66); Paidikalva Vijaykumar 4/40 (24 overs)	Ekana International Cricket Stadium, Lucknow; Umpires: Anil Dandekar and Nikhil Patwardhan; Player of the match: Manyala Pranith (Andhra)
Scorecard	171/6d (29.3 overs); Hanuma Vihari 57 (54); Mohammed Siraj 4/52 (8.3 overs)		56/5 (47.0 overs); S Badrinath 14* (84); Paidikalva Vijaykumar 2/13 (19 overs)	Ekana International Cricket Stadium, Lucknow; Umpires: Anil Dandekar and Nikhil Patwardhan; Player of the match: Manyala Pranith (Andhra)
Hyderabad won the toss and elected to field.; Manyala Pranith (Andhra) made his first-class debut.

Quarter-final

23–27 December 2016	Mumbai	v	Hyderabad	Mumbai won by 30 runs
Quarter-final 1 Scorecard	294 (101.4 overs); Siddhesh Lad 110 (205); Chama Milind 5/80 (23.4 overs)		280 (125.1 overs); Tanmay Agarwal 82 (284); Abhishek Nayar 4/60 (29 overs)	Shaheed Veer Narayan Singh International Stadium, Raipur; Umpires: Ulhas Gandhe and Nitin Pandit; Player of the match: Abhishek Nayar (Mumbai)
Quarter-final 1 Scorecard	217 (83.2 overs); Aditya Tare 57 (100); Mohammed Siraj 5/52 (14.2 overs)		201 (71 overs); Balchander Anirudh 84* (187); Abhishek Nayar 5/40 (20 overs)	Shaheed Veer Narayan Singh International Stadium, Raipur; Umpires: Ulhas Gandhe and Nitin Pandit; Player of the match: Abhishek Nayar (Mumbai)
Mumbai won the toss and elected to bat.

==== Statistics ====
Most runs

Player	Mat	Inns	Runs	Ave	SR	HS	100	50
Bavanaka Sandeep	9	15	612	47.07	41.63	203*	2	2
Balchander Anirudh	8	14	549	49.90	47.90	120*	1	3
S Badrinath	9	16	467	33.35	46.10	134	1	2

- Source: ESPNcricinfo

Most wickets

Player	Mat	Inns	Wkts	Ave	Econ	BBI	SR	5WI	10WM
Mohammad Siraj	9	17	41	18.92	2.86	5/52	39.5	1	0
Chama Milind	9	17	35	22.17	2.85	5/28	46.5	2	0
Ravi Kiran	9	17	34	20.67	2.55	4/32	48.5	0	0

- Source: ESPNcricinfo

=== Inter State Twenty-20 Tournament ===
Hyderabad began their campaign in the tournament against Goa at Velachery on 29 January 2017. This tournament performances were used to select the zonal teams for 2016-17 Syed Mushtaq Ali Trophy. They finished in third in South Zone with three wins and two losses.

==== Points Table ====
South Zone

Team	Pld	W	L	T	NR	Pts	NRR
Karnataka	5	4	1	0	0	16	+1.363
Tamil Nadu	5	4	1	0	0	16	+0.314
Hyderabad	5	3	2	0	0	12	+1.030
Kerala	5	2	3	0	0	8	+0.825
Andhra	5	2	3	0	0	8	-0.725
Goa	5	0	5	0	0	0	-3.312

- Winner of South Zone.

==== Matches ====
Zonal Stage

29 January 2017	Hyderabad; 224/4 (20 overs)	v	Goa; 173/5 (20 overs)	Hyderabad won by 51 runs
09:30 IST; Scorecard	Hyderabad; 224/4 (20 overs)	v	Goa; 173/5 (20 overs)	Guru Nanak College Ground, Velachery; Umpires: Sanjeev Dua and Navdeep Singh
09:30 IST; Scorecard	Tanmay Agarwal 91 (48); Ganeshraj Narvekar 1/28 (4 overs)		Saurabh Bandekar 53* (25); Mehdi Hasan 1/14 (1 over)	Guru Nanak College Ground, Velachery; Umpires: Sanjeev Dua and Navdeep Singh
Hyderabad won the toss and elected to bat; Ganeshraj Narvekar (Goa), Balchander Anirudh and Ravi Teja (Hyderabad) all made their T20 debuts.				Guru Nanak College Ground, Velachery; Umpires: Sanjeev Dua and Navdeep Singh

30 January 2017	Hyderabad; 165/5 (20 overs)	v	Tamil Nadu; 93 (19.1 overs)	Hyderabad won by 72 runs
13:30 IST; Scorecard	Hyderabad; 165/5 (20 overs)	v	Tamil Nadu; 93 (19.1 overs)	M. A. Chidambaram Stadium, Chennai; Umpires: Sanjeev Dua and Navdeep Singh
13:30 IST; Scorecard	Tanmay Agarwal 85 (49); Thangarasu Natarajan 2/31 (4 overs)		Narayan Jagadeesan 18 (15); Chama Milind 4/18 (3.1 overs)	M. A. Chidambaram Stadium, Chennai; Umpires: Sanjeev Dua and Navdeep Singh
Hyderabad won the toss and elected to bat; Narayan Jagadeesan (Tamil Nadu) made his T20 debut.				M. A. Chidambaram Stadium, Chennai; Umpires: Sanjeev Dua and Navdeep Singh

31 January 2017	Hyderabad; 126/8 (20 overs)	v	Kerala; 121/7 (20 overs)	Hyderabad won by 5 runs
13:30 IST; Scorecard	Hyderabad; 126/8 (20 overs)	v	Kerala; 121/7 (20 overs)	M. A. Chidambaram Stadium, Chennai; Umpires: Sanjeev Dua and Navdeep Singh
13:30 IST; Scorecard	Kolla Sumanth 46* (37); Fabid Ahmed 3/19 (4 overs)		Vishnu Vinod 37 (28); Mohammed Siraj 2/30 (4 overs)	M. A. Chidambaram Stadium, Chennai; Umpires: Sanjeev Dua and Navdeep Singh
Hyderabad won the toss and elected to bat				M. A. Chidambaram Stadium, Chennai; Umpires: Sanjeev Dua and Navdeep Singh

2 February 2017	Karnataka; 148/7 (20 overs)	v	Hyderabad; 134/6 (20 overs)	Karnataka won by 14 runs
09:30 IST; Scorecard	Karnataka; 148/7 (20 overs)	v	Hyderabad; 134/6 (20 overs)	M. A. Chidambaram Stadium, Chennai; Umpires: Kamlesh Sharma and Vineet Kulkarni
09:30 IST; Scorecard	Mayank Agarwal 65 (55); Mehdi Hassan 3/16 (4 overs)		Akshath Reddy 42 (32); Sreenath Arvind 3/25 (3 overs)	M. A. Chidambaram Stadium, Chennai; Umpires: Kamlesh Sharma and Vineet Kulkarni
Karnataka won the toss and elected to bat				M. A. Chidambaram Stadium, Chennai; Umpires: Kamlesh Sharma and Vineet Kulkarni

3 February 2017	Andhra; 140 (19.2 overs)	v	Hyderabad; 129 (20 overs)	Andhra won by 11 runs
09:30 IST; Scorecard	Andhra; 140 (19.2 overs)	v	Hyderabad; 129 (20 overs)	MRF Pachyappas Ground, Chennai; Umpires: Navdeep Singh and Nikhil Patwardhan
09:30 IST; Scorecard	Hanuma Vihari 49 (34); Mohammed Siraj 4/24 (4 overs)		Tanmay Agarwal 49 (32); Dasari Swaroop Kumar 5/19 (4 overs)	MRF Pachyappas Ground, Chennai; Umpires: Navdeep Singh and Nikhil Patwardhan
Andhra won the toss and elected to bat				MRF Pachyappas Ground, Chennai; Umpires: Navdeep Singh and Nikhil Patwardhan

==== Statistics ====
Most runs

Player	Mat	Inns	Runs	Ave	SR	HS	100	50
Tanmay Agarwal	5	5	250	50.00	162.33	91	0	2
S Badrinath	5	5	168	42.00	131.25	49	0	0
Akshath Reddy	5	5	110	22.00	137.50	55	0	1

- Source: ESPNcricinfo

Most wickets

Player	Mat	Inns	Wkts	Ave	Econ	BBI	SR	4WI	5WI
Mohammed Siraj	5	5	9	13.88	6.57	4/24	12.6	1	0
Chama Milind	5	5	8	13.62	6.22	4/18	13.1	1	0
Mehdi Hasan	5	5	6	15.66	5.87	3/16	16.0	0	0

- Source: ESPNcricinfo

=== Vijay Hazare Trophy ===
Hyderabad began their campaign in Vijay Hazare Trophy, a List A cricket tournament in India, against Jammu & Kashmir at Kolkata on 25 February 2017. They finished in third in Group D with four wins and two losses.

==== Points Table ====
Group D

Team	Pld	W	L	T	NR	Pts	NRR
Karnataka	6	6	0	0	0	24	+1.439
Jharkhand	6	4	2	0	0	16	+0.609
Hyderabad	6	4	2	0	0	16	-0.134
Services	6	3	3	0	0	12	+0.536
Chhattisgarh	6	2	4	0	0	8	-0.724
Saurashtra	6	1	5	0	0	4	-0.690
Jammu & Kashmir	6	1	5	0	0	4	-0.840

- Top two teams advanced to knockout stage.

==== Matches ====
Group Stage

25 February 2017	Hyderabad; 257 (49.3 overs)	v	Jammu & Kashmir; 228 (42.4 overs)	Hyderabad won by 29 runs
09:00 IST; Scorecard	Hyderabad; 257 (49.3 overs)	v	Jammu & Kashmir; 228 (42.4 overs)	Jadavpur University Campus Ground, Kolkata; Umpires: Umesh Dubey and Sanjay Hazare
09:00 IST; Scorecard	Tanmay Agarwal 68 (68); Manzoor Dar 2/30 (6 overs)		Ahmed Bandy 87 (92); Ravi Kiran 3/49 (9 overs)	Jadavpur University Campus Ground, Kolkata; Umpires: Umesh Dubey and Sanjay Hazare
Hyderabad won the toss and elected to bat.; Aamir Aziz and Manzoor Dar (Jammu & Kashmir) both made their List A debuts.				Jadavpur University Campus Ground, Kolkata; Umpires: Umesh Dubey and Sanjay Hazare

26 February 2017	Hyderabad; 312/7 (50 overs)	v	Saurashtra; 199 (38.5 overs)	Hyderabad won by 113 runs
Scorecard	Hyderabad; 312/7 (50 overs)	v	Saurashtra; 199 (38.5 overs)	Bengal Cricket Academy Ground, Kalyani; Umpires: Nikhil Patwardhan and Virender Sharma
Scorecard	Akshath Reddy 154 (132); Kushang Patel 3/54 (10 overs)		Prerak Mankad 104 (88); Chama Milind 4/30 (9 overs)	Bengal Cricket Academy Ground, Kalyani; Umpires: Nikhil Patwardhan and Virender Sharma
Hyderabad won the toss and elected to bat.; Harvik Desai (Saurashtra) made his List A debut.				Bengal Cricket Academy Ground, Kalyani; Umpires: Nikhil Patwardhan and Virender Sharma

1 March 2017	Chhattisgarh; 197 (47 overs)	v	Hyderabad; 193/9 (50 overs)	Hyderabad won by 4 runs
Scorecard	Chhattisgarh; 197 (47 overs)	v	Hyderabad; 193/9 (50 overs)	Jadavpur University Campus Ground, Kolkata; Umpires: Umesh Dubey and Virender Sharma
Scorecard	Bavanaka Sandeep 70* (99); Shubham Thakur 4/36 (9 overs)		Ashutosh Singh 65 (98); Mehdi Hasan 2/30 (10 overs)	Jadavpur University Campus Ground, Kolkata; Umpires: Umesh Dubey and Virender Sharma
Chhattisgarh won the toss and elected to field.; Shubham Thakur (Chhattisgarh) made his List A debut.				Jadavpur University Campus Ground, Kolkata; Umpires: Umesh Dubey and Virender Sharma

3 March 2017	Hyderabad; 203/8 (50 overs)	v	Jharkhand; 182 (44.2 overs)	Hyderabad won by 21 runs
Scorecard	Hyderabad; 203/8 (50 overs)	v	Jharkhand; 182 (44.2 overs)	Jadavpur University Campus Ground, Kolkata; Umpires: Nikhil Patwardhan and Virender Sharma
Scorecard	Kolla Sumanth 48 (76); Shahbaz Nadeem 3/27 (9 overs)		Saurabh Tiwary 102 (104); Mehdi Hasan 3/40 (9 overs)	Jadavpur University Campus Ground, Kolkata; Umpires: Nikhil Patwardhan and Virender Sharma
Jharkhand won the toss and elected to field.				Jadavpur University Campus Ground, Kolkata; Umpires: Nikhil Patwardhan and Virender Sharma

4 March 2017	Hyderabad; 108 (44 overs)	v	Karnataka; 109/9 (29.2 overs)	Karnataka won by 1 wicket
Scorecard	Hyderabad; 108 (44 overs)	v	Karnataka; 109/9 (29.2 overs)	Eden Gardens, Kolkata; Umpires: Sanjay Hazare and Virender Sharma
Scorecard	S Badrinath 18 (60); Krishnappa Gowtham 5/28 (8 overs)		Vinay Kumar 35* (56); Mohammad Siraj 3/24 (9 overs)	Eden Gardens, Kolkata; Umpires: Sanjay Hazare and Virender Sharma
Hyderabad won the toss and elected to bat.				Eden Gardens, Kolkata; Umpires: Sanjay Hazare and Virender Sharma

6 March 2017	Hyderabad; 88 (28.5 overs)	v	Services; 92/5 (20.2 overs)	Services won by 5 wickets
Scorecard	Hyderabad; 88 (28.5 overs)	v	Services; 92/5 (20.2 overs)	Eden Gardens, Kolkata; Umpires: Sanjay Hazare and Nikhil Patwardhan
Scorecard	Chama Milind 32 (43); Diwesh Pathania 4/21 (9.5 overs)		Gaurav Kochar 24 (37); Mohammad Siraj 2/31 (6.2 overs)	Eden Gardens, Kolkata; Umpires: Sanjay Hazare and Nikhil Patwardhan
Services won the toss and elected to field.; Mohammad Muddassir (Hyderabad) made his List A debut.				Eden Gardens, Kolkata; Umpires: Sanjay Hazare and Nikhil Patwardhan

==== Statistics ====
Most runs

Player	Mat	Inns	Runs	Ave	SR	HS	100	50
Akshath Reddy	6	6	257	42.83	86.82	154	1	1
Kolla Sumanth	6	6	176	35.20	71.54	91*	0	1
Tanmay Agarwal	6	6	136	22.66	69.38	68	0	1

- Source: ESPNcricinfo

Most wickets

Player	Mat	Inns	Wkts	Ave	Econ	BBI	SR	4WI	5WI
Chama Milind	6	6	13	14.76	4.08	4/30	21.6	1	0
Ravi Kiran	6	6	12	18.16	4.55	3/49	23.9	0	0
Mehdi Hasan	6	6	11	15.81	4.46	3/40	21.2	0	0

- Source: ESPNcricinfo

== Senior Women's team ==
=== Squads ===
- Head coach: Purnima Rao
- Assistant coach: Nooshin Al Khadeer
- Assistant coach: Savita Nirala
- Physio : Harsha Ganwal
- Trainer : M Shalini
- Video analyst : Aarti Nalge

One-Day League	T20 League
Gouher Sultana (c); Sravanthi Naidu; Samantha Lobatto (wk); Arundhati Reddy; Pranathi Reddy; Ananya Upendran; D Ramya; Rachna S Kumar; Bhogi Shravani; Himani Yadav; Ragashree Deshmukh; K Anitha; G Praneesha; Sunitha Anand (wk); M Soujanya Nath	Sravanthi Naidu (c); Arundhati Reddy; Gouher Sultana; Nishath Fatima (wk); Sunitha Anand (wk); Ananya Upendran; D Ramya; Himani Yadav; Pranathi Reddy; Rachna S Kumar; Bhogi Shravani; K Priyanka; E Chitra Maheshwari; K Anitha; P Monika; G Praneesha

Senior women's cricket inter zonal three day game

Arundhati Reddy, D Ramya, Himani Yadav, Ananya Upendran, Gouher Sultana and Sravanthi Naidu got selected for South Zone squad for 2016-17 Senior women's cricket inter zonal three day game, a Women's First-class cricket tournament in India.

=== One-Day League ===
Hyderabad began their campaign in Senior women's one day league, Women's List A cricket tournament in India, against Maharashtra at Raipur on 1 October 2016. They finished in fourth in Elite Group A with a win and two losses while the match against Goa was abandoned.

==== Points Table ====
Elite Group A

Team	Pld	W	L	T	NR	Pts	NRR
Maharashtra	4	4	0	0	0	16	+1.645
Delhi	4	2	2	0	0	8	+0.307
Baroda	4	2	2	0	0	8	-0.460
Hyderabad	4	1	2	0	1	6	+0.181
Goa	4	0	3	0	1	2	-1.825

Top two teams advanced to Super League.
Bottom team relegated to 2017-18 Plate Group.

==== Matches ====
Group Stage

1 October 2016	Hyderabad; 147/3 (50 overs)	v	Maharashtra; 148/6 (45.1 overs)	Maharashtra won by 4 wickets
Scorecard	Hyderabad; 147/3 (50 overs)	v	Maharashtra; 148/6 (45.1 overs)	Sector 10 Ground, Raipur; Umpires: Bhatt Vikas and Sud Abhiroope
Scorecard	Soujanya Nath 45* (94); UA Pawar 1/9 (8 overs)		Devika Vaidya 42 (65); Gouher Sultana 2/24 (10 overs)	Sector 10 Ground, Raipur; Umpires: Bhatt Vikas and Sud Abhiroope
Maharashtra won the toss and elected to field.				Sector 10 Ground, Raipur; Umpires: Bhatt Vikas and Sud Abhiroope

4 October 2016	Delhi; 130 (48.5 overs)	v	Hyderabad; 131/2 (34 overs)	Hyderabad won by 8 wickets
Scorecard	Delhi; 130 (48.5 overs)	v	Hyderabad; 131/2 (34 overs)	Shaheed Veer Narayan Singh International Cricket Stadium, Raipur; Umpires: Vashishta Gajanand and Chakravarti Indranil
Scorecard	Mandeep Kaur 36 (86); Arundhati Reddy 2/16 (10 overs)		Arundhati Reddy 55* (89); Neha Chillar 1/12 (6 overs)	Shaheed Veer Narayan Singh International Cricket Stadium, Raipur; Umpires: Vashishta Gajanand and Chakravarti Indranil
Hyderabad won the toss and elected to field.				Shaheed Veer Narayan Singh International Cricket Stadium, Raipur; Umpires: Vashishta Gajanand and Chakravarti Indranil

7 October 2016	Hyderabad; 164 (49.2 overs)	v	Goa –/–	Match Abandoned
Scorecard	Hyderabad; 164 (49.2 overs)	v	Goa –/–	Shaheed Veer Narayan Singh International Cricket Stadium, Raipur; Umpires: Chakravarti Indranil and Sud Abhiroope
Scorecard	Sravanthi Naidu 59 (90); Nikita Malik 3/24 (8.2 overs)			Shaheed Veer Narayan Singh International Cricket Stadium, Raipur; Umpires: Chakravarti Indranil and Sud Abhiroope
Hyderabad won the toss and elected to bat.				Shaheed Veer Narayan Singh International Cricket Stadium, Raipur; Umpires: Chakravarti Indranil and Sud Abhiroope

10 October 2016	Hyderabad; 123 (47.3 overs)	v	Baroda; 124/6 (47.5 overs)	Baroda won by 4 wickets
Scorecard	Hyderabad; 123 (47.3 overs)	v	Baroda; 124/6 (47.5 overs)	Shaheed Veer Narayan Singh International Cricket Stadium, Raipur; Umpires: Vashishta Gajanand and Sud Abhiroope
Scorecard	Pranathi Reddy 40* (31); S R Sharma 2/15 (8 overs)		Y H Bhatia 40 (106); Gouher Sultana 4/21 (10 overs)	Shaheed Veer Narayan Singh International Cricket Stadium, Raipur; Umpires: Vashishta Gajanand and Sud Abhiroope
Baroda won the toss and elected to field.				Shaheed Veer Narayan Singh International Cricket Stadium, Raipur; Umpires: Vashishta Gajanand and Sud Abhiroope

==== Statistics ====
Most runs

Player	Mat	Inns	Runs	Ave	SR	HS	100	50
Arundhati Reddy	4	4	123	41.00	43.61	55*	0	1
Sravanthi Naidu	4	4	118	59.00	59.29	59	0	1
Himani Yadav	4	4	103	25.75	62.42	50	0	1

- Source: BCCI

Most wickets

Player	Mat	Inns	Wkts	Ave	Econ	BBI	SR	4WI	5WI
Gouher Sultana	4	3	7	9.71	2.35	4/21	24.71	1	0
Ananya Upendran	4	3	3	18.00	2.07	2/17	52.00	0	0
Sravanthi Naidu	4	3	3	27.00	2.71	2/24	59.66	0	0

- Source: BCCI

=== T20 League ===
Hyderabad began their campaign in Senior Women's T20 League, a Women's Twenty20 cricket tournament in India, against Madhya Pradesh at Jamshedpur on 2 January 2017. They finished inside top-2 in Elite Group-B with three wins and a loss to advance to Super League. They finished as Runners-up of the tournament after finishing second in Super League with a win and two losses.

==== Points Table ====
Elite Group B

Team	Pld	W	L	T	NR	Pts	NRR
Madhya Pradesh	4	4	0	0	0	16	+0.192
Hyderabad	4	3	1	0	0	12	+0.532
Uttar Pradesh	4	2	2	0	0	8	+0.031
Goa	4	1	3	0	0	4	+0.113
Odisha	4	0	4	0	0	0	-0.844

Top two teams advanced to Super League.
Bottom team relegated to 2017-18 Plate Group.

Elite Super League

Team	Pld	W	L	T	NR	Pts	NRR
Railways	3	3	0	0	0	12	+2.183
Hyderabad	3	1	2	0	0	4	-0.282
Bengal	3	1	2	0	0	4	-0.625
Madhya Pradesh	3	1	2	0	0	4	-1.083

Champions.
Runners-up.

==== Matches ====
Group Stage

2 January 2017	Madhya Pradesh; 99/7 (20 overs)	v	Hyderabad; 98/8 (20 overs)	Madhya Pradesh won by 1 run
Scorecard	Madhya Pradesh; 99/7 (20 overs)	v	Hyderabad; 98/8 (20 overs)	Keenan Stadium, Jamshedpur; Umpires: Bahuleyan Viswajith and Sahasrabudhe Anish
Scorecard	Shweta Mishra 48 (54); Gouher Sultana 4/25 (4 overs)		Sravanthi Naidu 28 (42); Nidhi Buley 2/15 (4 overs)	Keenan Stadium, Jamshedpur; Umpires: Bahuleyan Viswajith and Sahasrabudhe Anish
Madhya Pradesh won the toss and elected to bat.				Keenan Stadium, Jamshedpur; Umpires: Bahuleyan Viswajith and Sahasrabudhe Anish

4 January 2017	Uttar Pradesh; 105/6 (20 overs)	v	Hyderabad; 106/8 (19.4 overs)	Hyderabad won by 2 wickets
Scorecard	Uttar Pradesh; 105/6 (20 overs)	v	Hyderabad; 106/8 (19.4 overs)	Keenan Stadium, Jamshedpur; Umpires: Bahuleyan Viswajith and Bhatt Milind
Scorecard	Shashi Mathur 22 (33); Sravanthi Naidu 2/27 (4 overs)		Pranathi Reddy 36* (28); Rashi Kanojiya 2/8 (4 overs)	Keenan Stadium, Jamshedpur; Umpires: Bahuleyan Viswajith and Bhatt Milind
Hyderabad won the toss and elected to field.				Keenan Stadium, Jamshedpur; Umpires: Bahuleyan Viswajith and Bhatt Milind

5 January 2017	Odisha; 69/9 (20 overs)	v	Hyderabad; 70/3 (17.1 overs)	Hyderabad won by 7 wickets
Scorecard	Odisha; 69/9 (20 overs)	v	Hyderabad; 70/3 (17.1 overs)	Keenan Stadium, Jamshedpur; Umpires: Bhanushali Ashish and Bahuleyan Viswajith
Scorecard	Sarita Meher 27 (33); Arundhati Reddy 2/9 (4 overs)		Sravanthi Naidu 29 (47); Rasanara Parwin 1/7 (1 over)	Keenan Stadium, Jamshedpur; Umpires: Bhanushali Ashish and Bahuleyan Viswajith
Odisha won the toss and elected to bat.				Keenan Stadium, Jamshedpur; Umpires: Bhanushali Ashish and Bahuleyan Viswajith

6 January 2017	Goa; 70/7 (20 overs)	v	Hyderabad; 73/3 (15.1 overs)	Hyderabad won by 7 wickets
Scorecard	Goa; 70/7 (20 overs)	v	Hyderabad; 73/3 (15.1 overs)	Keenan Stadium, Jamshedpur; Umpires: Bhanushali Ashish and Bahuleyan Viswajith
Scorecard	Nikita Malik 19* (27); Rachna S Kumar 2/6 (3 overs)		D Ramya 34 (43); Nikita Malik 1/7 (1 over)	Keenan Stadium, Jamshedpur; Umpires: Bhanushali Ashish and Bahuleyan Viswajith
Hyderabad won the toss and elected to field.				Keenan Stadium, Jamshedpur; Umpires: Bhanushali Ashish and Bahuleyan Viswajith

Super League Stage

10 January 2017	Railways; 167/0 (20 overs)	v	Hyderabad; 158/4 (20 overs)	Railways won by 9 runs
Scorecard	Railways; 167/0 (20 overs)	v	Hyderabad; 158/4 (20 overs)	Railway Cricket Ground, Rajkot; Umpires: Sahasrabudhe Anish and Bhatt Milind
Scorecard	Mithali Raj 100* (66)		Sravanthi Naidu 73* (58); Poonam Yadav 2/27 (3 overs)	Railway Cricket Ground, Rajkot; Umpires: Sahasrabudhe Anish and Bhatt Milind
Railways won the toss and elected to bat.				Railway Cricket Ground, Rajkot; Umpires: Sahasrabudhe Anish and Bhatt Milind

11 January 2017	Madhya Pradesh; 122/6 (20 overs)	v	Hyderabad; 112/8 (20 overs)	Madhya Pradesh won by 10 runs
Scorecard	Madhya Pradesh; 122/6 (20 overs)	v	Hyderabad; 112/8 (20 overs)	Railway Cricket Ground, Rajkot; Umpires: Bhatt Milind and R Rajesh Kannan
Scorecard	Tamanna Nigam 32 (24); Arundhati Reddy 1/14 (4 overs)		Arundhati Reddy 37 (37); Nidhi Buley 3/12 (4 overs)	Railway Cricket Ground, Rajkot; Umpires: Bhatt Milind and R Rajesh Kannan
Hyderabad won the toss and elected to field.				Railway Cricket Ground, Rajkot; Umpires: Bhatt Milind and R Rajesh Kannan

13 January 2017	Bengal; 112/5 (20 overs)	v	Hyderabad; 113/5 (19.5 overs)	Hyderabad won by 5 wickets
Scorecard	Bengal; 112/5 (20 overs)	v	Hyderabad; 113/5 (19.5 overs)	Railway Cricket Ground, Rajkot; Umpires: Bhatt Milind and Kurra Prabhakar Rao
Scorecard	Richa 47 (67); Gouher Sultana 2/20 (4 overs)		Ananya Upendran 35 (46); S P Aich 2/22 (4 overs)	Railway Cricket Ground, Rajkot; Umpires: Bhatt Milind and Kurra Prabhakar Rao
Bengal won the toss and elected to bat.				Railway Cricket Ground, Rajkot; Umpires: Bhatt Milind and Kurra Prabhakar Rao

==== Statistics ====
Most runs

Player	Mat	Inns	Runs	Ave	SR	HS	100	50
Sravanthi Naidu	6	5	146	36.50	85.38	73*	0	1
D Ramya	7	7	144	20.57	91.13	68	0	1
Arundhati Reddy	7	7	99	16.50	81.81	37	0	0

- Source: BCCI

Most wickets

Player	Mat	Inns	Wkts	Ave	Econ	BBI	SR	4WI	5WI
Gouher Sultana	7	7	10	13.50	4.82	4/25	16.80	1	0
Rachna S Kumar	5	5	5	15.40	4.52	2/6	20.40	0	0
Sravanthi Naidu	6	5	5	20.80	5.77	2/11	21.60	0	0

- Source: BCCI

== See also ==
Hyderabad cricket team
Hyderabad women's cricket team
Hyderabad Cricket Association
