= 2016–17 Vijay Hazare Trophy Group D =

- Dates: 25 February 2017 – 6 March 2017
- Administrator: BCCI
- Cricket format: List A cricket
- Tournament format(s): Round-robin and Playoff format
- Host: Kolkata
- Participants: 7
- Matches: 21
- Official website: Official website

2016–17 Vijay Hazare Trophy is the 15th season of the Vijay Hazare Trophy, a List A cricket tournament in India. It will be contested by 28 domestic cricket teams of India.

== Points table ==
| Pos | Team | Pld | W | L | T | NR | Pts | NRR | Qualification |
|---|---|---|---|---|---|---|---|---|---|
| 1 | Karnataka | 6 | 6 | 0 | 0 | 0 | 24 | 1.439 | Knockout Stage |
| 2 | Jharkhand | 6 | 4 | 2 | 0 | 0 | 16 | 0.609 | Knockout Stage |
| 3 | Hyderabad | 6 | 4 | 2 | 0 | 0 | 16 | −0.134 | |
| 4 | Services | 6 | 3 | 3 | 0 | 0 | 12 | 0.536 | |
| 5 | Chhattisgarh | 6 | 2 | 4 | 0 | 0 | 8 | −0.724 | |
| 6 | Saurashtra | 6 | 1 | 5 | 0 | 0 | 4 | −0.690 | |
| 7 | Jammu & Kashmir | 6 | 1 | 5 | 0 | 0 | 4 | −0.840 | |

== Fixtures ==
=== Round 1 ===
25 Feb 2017
09:00 IST
Scorecard

| Hyderabad | v | Jammu & Kashmir |

Hyderabad won by 29 runs

- Aamir Aziz and Manzoor Dar (Jammu & Kashmir) both made their List A debuts.

25 Feb 2017
09:00 IST
Scorecard

| Jharkhand | v | Karnataka |

Karnataka won by 5 runs

- Pavan Deshpande, Krishnappa Gowtham, T Pradeep and Prasidh Krishna (Karnataka) all made their List A debuts.

25 Feb 2017
09:00 IST
Scorecard

| Saurashtra | v | Services |

Services won by 48 runs

- Prerak Mankad, Kushang Patel, Abrar Shaikh (Saurashtra); Shakti Malviya, Poonam Poonia, Abhijit Salvi and Vipin Singh (Services) all made their List A debuts.

=== Round 2 ===
26 February 2017
Scorecard

| Chhattisgarh | v | Jharkhand |

Jharkhand won by 78 runs

- Shubham Agarwal, Ashutosh Singh, Sahil Gupta, Kant Singh, Amandeep Khare, Shourabh Kharwar and Manoj Singh (Chhattisgarh) all made their List A debuts.

26 February 2017
Scorecard

| Hyderabad | v | Saurashtra |

Hyderabad won by 113 runs

- Harvik Desai (Saurashtra) made his List A debut.

26 February 2017
Scorecard

| Karnataka | v | Services |

Karnataka won by 4 wickets

=== Round 3 ===
28 February 2017
Scorecard

| Chhattisgarh | v | Jammu & Kashmir |

- Rohit Dhruw (Chhattisgarh) made his List A debut.

28 February 2017
Scorecard

| Jharkhand | v | Services |

- Gaurav Kochar and Sachin Shinde (Services) both made their List A debuts.

28 February 2017
Scorecard

| Karnataka | v | Saurashtra |

- Snell Patel (Saurashtra) made his List A debut.

=== Round 4 ===
1 March 2017
Scorecard

| Chhattisgarh | v | Hyderabadh |

- Shubham Thakur (Chhattisgarh) made his List A debut.

1 March 2017
Scorecard

| Jammu & Kashmir | v | Services |

1 March 2017
Scorecard

| Jharkhand | v | Saurashtra |

- Agnivesh Ayachi (Saurashtra) made his List A debut.

=== Round 5 ===
3 March 2017
Scorecard

| Chhattisgarh | v | Saurashtra |

- Omkar Verma (Chhattisgarh) made his List A debut.

3 March 2017
Scorecard

| Hyderabad | v | Jharkhand |

3 March 2017
Scorecard

| Jammu & Kashmir | v | Karnataka |

=== Round 6 ===
4 March 2017
Scorecard

| Chhattisgarh | v | Services |

- Avnish Dhaliwal (Chhattisgarh), Sachidanand Pandey and Hitesh Solanki (Services) all made their List A debuts.

4 March 2017
Scorecard

| Hyderabad | v | Karnataka |

4 March 2017
Scorecard

| Jammu & Kashmir | v | Saurashtra |

- Vishwajeet Singh (Jammu & Kashmir) made his List A debut.

=== Round 7 ===
6 March 2017
Scorecard

| Chhattisgarh | v | Karnataka |

- Rohan Kadam (Karnataka) made his List A debut.

6 March 2017
Scorecard

| Hyderabad | v | Services |

- Mohammad Muddassir (Hyderabad) made his List A debut.

6 March 2017
Scorecard

| Jharkhand | v | Jammu & Kashmir |

- Anshuman Singh (Jammu & Kashmir) and Shasheem Rathour (Jharkhand) both made their List A debuts.
