= List of Jammu and Kashmir cricketers =

This is a partial list of cricketers who have played for the Jammu and Kashmir Cricket Association in first-class, List A and Twenty20 cricket.

== A ==
- Aftab Ahmed
- Imtiaz Ahmed
- Omar Alam (born 1985)
- Mehjoor Ali (born 1991)
- Suhail Andleev (born 1982)
- Aamir Aziz (born 1990)

== B ==
- Ahmed Bandy (born 1995)
- Samiullah Beigh (born 1981)
- Samad Bhat (born 1995)
- Manvinder Bisla (born 1984)

== C ==
- Aakash Choudhary (born 1994)

== D ==
- Manzoor Dar (born 1993)
- Ram Dayal (born 1988)
- Deepak Dogra (born 1991)

== G ==
- Manik Gupta (born 1990)
- Pranav Gupta (born 1993)

== H ==
- Obaid Haroon (born 1986)

== I ==
- Mohsin Iqbal (born 1983)

== J ==
- Jasia Akhtar
- Ajay Jadeja (born 1971)

== K ==
- Sameer Khajuria
- Shubham Khajuria (born 1995)
- Amjad Khan (born 1966)
- Amjad Khan (born 1966)

== L ==
- Amir Hussain Lone (born 1990).

== M ==
- Vinayak Mane (born 1982)
- Deepak Manhas (born 1992)
- Mithun Manhas (born 1979)
- Umar Nazir Mir (born 1993)
- Mohammed Mudhasir (born 1988)
- Mohsin Mufti (born 1990)
- Sayim Mustafa (born 1991)

== N ==
- Abid Nabi (born 1985)
- Aquib Nazir
- Umar Nissar (born 1993)
- Ahmed Nizam (born 1986)

== P ==
- Abhinav Puri (born 1994)

== Q ==
- Abdul Qayoom (born 1967)
- Iqra Rasool (born 2000)
- Parvez Rasool (born 1989)
- Waseem Raza (born 1993)
- Adil Reshi (born 1989)

== R ==
- Aadil Rashid (born 1990)

== S ==
- Syed Sagar
- Hiken Shah (born 1984)
- Owais Shah (born 1990)
- Arun Sharma (born 1973)
- Muzaffar Baig ( Born 1966 )
- Paras Sharma (born 1995)
- Rohit Sharma (born 1994)
- Sahil Sharma (born 1989)
- Aditya Singh (born 1973)
- Sukhdev Singh (born 1973)
- Bandeep Singh (born 1989)
- Hardeep Singh (born 1981)
- Mushtaq Mohammad (born 1967)
- Ian Dev Singh
- Vishwajeet Singh (born 1991)
- Zahoor Sofi (born 1987)
- Shahid Latief (born 2002)
- Saket Sinha (born 1967)
- Salman Bhat (born 1968)
- Ashraf Dar (born 1966)

== U ==
- Irfan-ul-Haq (born 1996)
- Umran Malik

== W ==
- Jatin Wadhwan (born 1994)
