= Vipin =

- Gender: Male

Origin
- Meaning: in the forest
- Region of origin: India

Vipin is an Indian name. It may refer to:

- Vipin Aneja, Indian singer
- Vipin Vrindavanam (born 1987), Marketing & Sales Manager, Script Writer Malayalam Movies
- Vipin Buckshey (born 1955), Indian optometrist
- Vipin Das
- Vipin Dhaka
- Vipin Handa (born 1956), Indian film producer
- Vipin Indira Panabhan Nayar
- Vipin Kasana
- Vipin Khanna
- Vipin Kumar
- Vipin Kumar David
- Vipin Kumar Tripathi
- Vipin Mohan
- Vipin Narang
- Vipin Parikh
- Vipin Patwa (born 1982), Indian music director
- Vipin Pubby (born 1956), Indian journalist
- Vipin Sharma (born 1979), Indian actor
- Vipin Sanghi
- Vipin Singh
- Vipin Singh Parmar
- Vipin Vijay (born 1977), Indian film director
- Devang Vipin Khakhar (born 1959), Indian chemical engineer
- Siddharth Vipin, Indian music composer
- Vipin Itankar (born 1984), Indian Administrative Service Officer, Collector of Nagpur
