= 2016–17 Syed Mushtaq Ali Trophy =

Indian cricket tournament

- Dates: 12 – 18 February 2017
- Administrator: BCCI
- Cricket format: T20
- Tournament format(s): Round robin, then knockout
- Host: Mumbai
- Champions: East Zone (1st title)
- Participants: 5
- Matches: 10
- Most runs: Harpreet Singh Bhatia (211) (Central Zone)
- Most wickets: Karn Sharma (6) (Central Zone)
- Official website: http://www.bcci.tv

The 2016–17 Syed Mushtaq Ali Trophy was the ninth edition of the Syed Mushtaq Ali Trophy, an annual Twenty20 tournament in India. Since it began in 2006–07, the tournament had involved the Ranji Trophy state teams only but for the 2016–17 edition the BCCI decided to run this event as a zonal competition involving the five Duleep Trophy teams. The state teams were assigned to a new competition called the 2016–17 Inter State Twenty-20 Tournament. This arrangement lasted only one season and the state teams returned in 2017–18. All the inter-zonal matches were played in Mumbai from 12 to 18 February 2017, and the winners were East Zone.

== Squads ==
| Central Zone | East Zone | North Zone | South Zone | West Zone |
|---|---|---|---|---|
| Naman Ojha (C) (MP); Akshdeep Nath (UP); Amandeep Khare (Cht); Ambati Rayudu (Vid); Amit Mishra (UP); Aniket Choudhary (Raj); Ankit Rajpoot (UP); Apoorv Wankhade (Vid); Harpreet Singh (MP); Karn Sharma (Rlw); Mahesh Rawat (Rlw); Mahipal Lomror (Raj); Shubham Agarwal (Cht); Sohraab Dhaliwal (MP) | Manoj Tiwary (c) (Bng); Amit Verma (Ass); Arun Karthik (Ass); Ashok Dinda (Bng); Biplab Samantray (Odi); Ishan Kishan (Jhr); Ishank Jaggi (Jhr); Pragyan Ojha (Bng); Pritam Das (Ass); Saurabh Tiwary (Jhr); Sayan Ghosh (Bng); Shahbaz Nadeem (Jhr); Shreevats Goswami (Bng); Suryakant Pradhan (Odi); Virat Singh (Jhr); Writtick Chatterjee (Bng) | Harbhajan Singh (c) (Pnb); Amit Pachhara (Scs); Ashish Nehra (Del); Gautam Gambhir (Del); Unmukt Chand (Del); Yuzvendra Chahal (Har); Mandeep Singh (Pnb); Mayank Dagar (HP); Mohit Sharma (Har); Milind Kumar (Del); Rishi Dhawan (HP); Parvez Rasool (J&K); Pradeep Sangwan (Del); Rishabh Pant (Del); Shikhar Dhawan (Del); Umar Nazir Mir (J&K); Yuvraj Singh (Pnb) | Vinay Kumar (c) (Kar); Basil Thampi (Ker); Chama Milind (Hyd); Dasari Swaroop Kumar (And); Dinesh Karthik (TN); Hanuma Vihari (And); Mayank Agarwal (Kar); Murugan Ashwin (TN); Pavan Deshpande (Kar); Rahil Shah (TN); Ricky Bhui (And); Sandeep Warrier (Ker); Sreenath Aravind (Kar).; Tanmay Agarwal (Hyd); Vijay Shankar (TN); Vishnu Vinod (Ker) | Parthiv Patel (c) (Guj); Abhishek Nayar (Mum); Aditya Tare (Mum); Ankit Bawne (Mah); Deepak Hooda (Bar); Dharmendrasinh Jadeja (Sau); Irfan Pathan (Bar); Ishwar Chaudhary (Guj); Jagdish Zope (Mum); Kedar Jadhav (Mah); Pravin Tambe (Mum); Prerak Mankad (Sau); Priyank Panchal (Guj); Rujul Bhatt (Guj); Shardul Thakur (Mum); Sheldon Jackson (Sau); Shreyas Iyer (Mum) |

== Points Table ==
| Team | Pld | W | L | Tie | A | Pts | NRR |
|---|---|---|---|---|---|---|---|
| East Zone | 4 | 4 | 0 | 0 | 0 | 16 | 1.739 |
| Central Zone | 4 | 3 | 1 | 0 | 0 | 12 | -0.012 |
| South Zone | 4 | 1 | 3 | 0 | 0 | 4 | -0.028 |
| West Zone | 4 | 1 | 3 | 0 | 0 | 4 | -0.459 |
| North Zone | 4 | 1 | 3 | 0 | 0 | 4 | -1.129 |

== Fixtures ==
12 February 2017
09:30
Scorecard

| West Zone; 160/8 (20 overs) | v | Central Zone; 165/4 (18.2 overs) |
| Deepak Hooda 49* (26); Aniket Choudhary 3/47 (4 overs) | | Harpreet Singh Bhatia 62 (42); Ishwar Chaudhary 2/20 (3 overs) |

Central Zone won by 6 wickets
Wankhede Stadium, Mumbai
Umpires: Navdeep Singh and Krishnamachari Srinivasan

- Central Zone won the toss and elected to field.

12 February 2017
13:30
Scorecard

| South Zone; 173/5 (20 overs) | v | North Zone; 176/2 (18.4 overs) |
| Ricky Bhui 50 (37); Mayank Dagar 2/31 (4 overs) | | Gautam Gambhir 81 (51); Murugan Ashwin 1/23 (4 overs) |

North Zone won by 8 wickets
Wankhede Stadium, Mumbai
Umpires: Anil Dandekar and Tapan Sharma

- North Zone won the toss and elected to field

13 February 2017
09:30
Scorecard

| North Zone; 107/8 (20 overs) | v | West Zone; 108/2 (12.4 overs) |
| Gautam Gambhir 60 (58); Irfan Pathan 3/10 (4 overs) | | Parthiv Patel 78 (35); Parvez Rasool 1/7 (2 overs) |

West Zone won by 8 wickets
Wankhede Stadium, Mumbai
Umpires: Krishnamachari Srinivasan and Nikhil Patwardhan

- West Zone won the toss and elected to field.

13 February 2017
13:30
Scorecard

| Central Zone; 151/7 (20 overs) | v | East Zone; 154/3 (17.1 overs) |
| Naman Ojha 51 (48); Ashok Dinda 2/24 (4 overs) | | Ishan Kishan 67 (36); Ankit Rajpoot 0/22 (3.1 overs) |

East Zone won by 7 wickets
Wankhede Stadium, Mumbai
Umpires: Sadashiv Iyer and Anil Dandekar

- East Zone won the toss and elected to field

15 February 2017
09:30
Scorecard

| South Zone; 178/6 (20 overs) | v | East Zone; 181/4 (19.4 overs) |
| Mayank Agarwal 72 (36); Manoj Tiwary 3/31 (4 overs) | | Ishank Jaggi 90 (51); Vijay Shankar 1/18 (3 overs) |

East Zone won by 6 wickets
Wankhede Stadium, Mumbai
Umpires: Nikhil Patwardhan and Tapan Sharma

- East Zone won the toss and elected to field.

15 February 2017
13:30
Scorecard

| Central Zone; 167/7 (20 overs) | v | North Zone; 163/6 (20 overs) |
| Mahesh Rawat 57* (40); Ashish Nehra 3/26 (4 overs) | | Yuvraj Singh 33 (20); Karn Sharma 3/17 (4 overs) |

Central Zone won by 4 runs
Wankhede Stadium, Mumbai
Umpires: Sadashiv Iyer and Anil Dandekar

- North Zone won the toss and elected to field

16 February 2017
09:30
Scorecard

| West Zone; 140/9 (20 overs) | v | South Zone; 141/5 (17.4 overs) |
| Deepak Hooda 32 (21); Vijay Shankar 2/21 (4 overs) | | Mayank Agarwal 70 (46); Irfan Pathan 1/22 (4 overs) |

South Zone won by 5 wickets
Wankhede Stadium, Mumbai
Umpires: Navdeep Singh and Tapan Sharma

- South Zone won the toss and elected to field

16 February 2017
13:30
Scorecard

| North Zone; 159/9 (20 overs) | v | East Zone; 162/2 (16.3 overs) |
| Yuvraj Singh 38 (24); Pragyan Ojha 3/33 (4 overs) | | Manoj Tiwary 75* (43); Pradeep Sangwan 1/26 (3 overs) |

East Zone won by 8 wickets
Wankhede Stadium, Mumbai
Umpires: Krishnamachari Srinivasan and Sadashiv Iyer

- East Zone won the toss and elected to field

17 February 2017
09:30
Scorecard

| West Zone; 149/5 (20 overs) | v | East Zone; 153/2 (13.4 overs) |
| Sheldon Jackson 52 (44); Pritam Das 2/25 (4 overs) | | Virat Singh 58* (34); Shardul Thakur 2/31 (3 overs) |

East Zone won by 8 wickets
Wankhede Stadium, Mumbai
Umpires: Nikhil Patwardhan and Sadashiv Iyer

- East Zone won the toss and elected to field

17 February 2017
13.30
Scorecard

| South Zone; 181/7 (20 overs) | v | Central Zone; 184/8 (20 overs) |
| Vijay Shankar 40 (26); Karn Sharma 2/31 (4 overs) | | Harpreet Singh Bhatia 92 (51); Rahil Shah 2/20 (3 overs) |

Central Zone won by 2 wickets
Wankhede Stadium, Mumbai
Umpires: Navdeep Singh and Rohan Pandit

- Central Zone won the toss and elected to field
