= Narvekar =

Narvekar is a surname. Notable people with the surname include:

- Dayanand Narvekar (born 1950), Indian politician
- Ganeshraj Narvekar (born 1993), Indian cricketer
- Lata Narvekar, Marathi drama producer
- Sanjay Narvekar (born 1962), Indian actor
- Yash Narvekar, Indian playback singer, composer, and lyricist
