= Amir Sofi =

Amir Sofi may refer to:

- Amir Sofi (cricketer, born 1992), Indian cricketer
- Amir Aziz Sofi (born 1990), Indian cricketer
- Amir Sofi (musician), Darbuka player
