= List of 2017 Indian Premier League personnel changes =

This is a list of all personnel changes for the 2017 Indian Premier League (IPL).

== Retained players ==
The eight IPL teams could retain and release players from their squad during the retention window which ended on 15 December 2016. The salaries of the released players would be added to the salary purse of ₹66 crore, while the salaries of the retained players was deducted from this purse. The list of retained and released players was made public on 19 December 2016.

== Transfers ==
The first trading window was open in December 2016 while the second trading window was open from 13 to 20 January 2017.

The following transfers were made during the trading windows:

Player	From	To
Mayank Agarwal	Delhi Daredevils	Rising Pune Supergiant
Shardul Thakur	Kings XI Punjab	Rising Pune Supergiant

== Auction ==
The players auction for the 2017 Indian Premier League was originally scheduled to be held in Bangalore on 4 February 2017, but was pushed forward by at least two weeks due to the BCCI–Lodha committee stand-off. On 3 February, the BCCI announced that the auction would be held on 20 February in Bangalore and that a total of 799 players have signed up for it. On 14 February, the IPL Desk released a list of 351 players.

=== Sold players ===
Out of the 351 players shortlisted, the following 66 players were sold at the 2017 IPL Auction:

Player	Team	Base price (in ₹ lakhs)	Winning bid (in ₹ lakhs)
Eoin Morgan	Kings XI Punjab	200	200
Pawan Negi	Royal Challengers Bangalore	30	100
Angelo Mathews	Delhi Daredevils	200	200
Ben Stokes	Rising Pune Supergiants	200	1450
Corey Anderson	Delhi Daredevils	100	100
Nicholas Pooran	Mumbai Indians	30	30
Kagiso Rabada	Delhi Daredevils	100	500
Trent Boult	Kolkata Knight Riders	150	500
Tymal Mills	Royal Challengers Bangalore	50	1200
Pat Cummins	Delhi Daredevils	200	450
Mitchell Johnson	Mumbai Indians	200	200
Ankit Bawne	Delhi Daredevils	10	10
Tanmay Agarwal	Sunrisers Hyderabad	10	10
Mohammad Nabi	Sunrisers Hyderabad	30	30
K Gowtham	Mumbai Indians	10	200
Rahul Tewatia	Kings XI Punjab	10	25
Aditya Tare	Delhi Daredevils	20	25
Eklavya Dwivedi	Sunrisers Hyderabad	30	75
Aniket Choudhary	Royal Challengers Bangalore	10	200
T Natarajan	Kings XI Punjab	10	300
Nathu Singh	Gujarat Lions	30	50
Basil Thampi	Gujarat Lions	10	85
M Ashwin	Delhi Daredevils	10	100
Tejas Baroka	Gujarat Lions	10	10
Rashid Khan	Sunrisers Hyderabad	50	400
Pravin Tambe	Sunrisers Hyderabad	10	10
Chris Woakes	Kolkata Knight Riders	200	420
Karn Sharma	Mumbai Indians	30	320
Rishi Dhawan	Kolkata Knight Riders	30	55
Matt Henry	Kings XI Punjab	50	50
Jaydev Unadkat	Rising Pune Supergiants	30	30
Varun Aaron	Kings XI Punjab	30	280
Manpreet Gony	Gujarat Lions	30	60
Martin Guptill	Kings XI Punjab	50	50
Jason Roy	Gujarat Lions	100	100
Saurabh Tiwary	Mumbai Indians	30	30
Chris Jordan	Sunrisers Hyderabad	50	50
Nathan Coulter-Nile	Kolkata Knight Riders	100	350
Praveen Dubey	Royal Challengers Bangalore	10	10
Navdeep Saini	Delhi Daredevils	10	10
Ben Laughlin	Sunrisers Hyderabad	30	30
Billy Stanlake	Royal Challengers Bangalore	30	30
Mohammed Siraj	Sunrisers Hyderabad	20	260
Rahul Chahar	Rising Pune Supergiants	10	10
Saurabh Kumar	Rising Pune Supergiants	10	10
Asela Gunaratne	Mumbai Indians	30	30
Daniel Christian	Rising Pune Supergiants	100	100
Rovman Powell	Kolkata Knight Riders	30	30
Darren Sammy	Kings XI Punjab	30	30
Munaf Patel	Gujarat Lions	30	30
Rinku Singh	Kings XI Punjab	10	10
Shashank Singh	Delhi Daredevils	10	10
Milind Tandon	Rising Pune Supergiants	10	10
Kulwant Khejroliya	Mumbai Indians	10	10
Chirag Suri	Gujarat Lions	10	10
R Sanjay Yadav	Kolkata Knight Riders	10	10
Shelley Shaurya	Gujarat Lions	10	10
Shubham Agarwal	Gujarat Lions	10	10
Ishank Jaggi	Kolkata Knight Riders	10	10
Rahul Tripathi	Rising Pune Supergiants	10	10
Pratham Singh	Gujarat Lions	10	10
Akshdeep Nath	Gujarat Lions	10	10
Lockie Ferguson	Rising Pune Supergiants	50	50
Manoj Tiwary	Rising Pune Supergiants	50	50
Darren Bravo	Kolkata Knight Riders	50	50
Sayan Ghosh	Kolkata Knight Riders	10	10

== Support staff changes ==
- In November 2016, Mahela Jayawardene was appointed head coach of the Mumbai Indians, replacing Ricky Ponting.
- In December 2016, Wasim Akram stepped down as the bowling coach and mentor of the Kolkata Knight Riders for the 2017 season, citing "professional commitments and time constraints."
- In December 2016, Sanjay Bangar stepped down as the head coach of Kings XI Punjab.
- In January 2017, Lakshmipathy Balaji was named bowling coach of the Kolkata Knight Riders.
- In January 2017, Virender Sehwag was named head of cricket operations and strategy of Kings XI Punjab.
- In February 2017, J. Arunkumar was named batting coach of Kings XI Punjab.
- In February 2017, Mohammad Kaif was named assistant coach of Gujarat Lions.

== Withdrawn players ==
The following players withdrew from the tournament either due to injuries or because of other reasons.

Player	Team	Reason	Announcement date	Replacement	Signing date	Ref
Andre Russell	Kolkata Knight Riders	Doping code violation ban	31 January 2017	Colin de Grandhomme	3 April 2017	
Mitchell Marsh	Rising Pune Supergiant	Shoulder injury	12 March 2017	Imran Tahir	23 March 2017	
JP Duminy	Delhi Daredevils	Personal reasons	20 March 2017	Ben Hilfenhaus	7 April 2017	
Quinton de Kock	Delhi Daredevils	Finger injury	24 March 2017	Marlon Samuels	27 April 2017	
KL Rahul	Royal Challengers Bangalore	Shoulder injury	31 March 2017	Vishnu Vinod	7 April 2017	
Ravichandran Ashwin	Rising Pune Supergiant	Sports hernia	31 March 2017	Washington Sundar	5 April 2017	
Murali Vijay	Kings XI Punjab	Wrist and shoulder injury	4 April 2017	Ishant Sharma	4 April 2017	
Sarfaraz Khan	Royal Challengers Bangalore	Leg injury	20 April 2017	Harpreet Singh Bhatia	20 April 2017	
Dwayne Bravo	Gujarat Lions	Hamstring injury rehab	23 April 2017	Irfan Pathan	24 April 2017	
Shivil Kaushik	Gujarat Lions	Injury	26 April 2017	Ankit Soni	26 April 2017	
Andrew Tye	Gujarat Lions	Dislocated shoulder	30 April 2017			
Brendon McCullum	Gujarat Lions	Hamstring strain	5 May 2017			
Nathu Singh	Gujarat Lions	Back spasms	5 May 2017			
Jason Roy	Gujarat Lions	International duty	2 May 2017			
Marcus Stoinis	Kings XI Punjab	Shoulder injury	6 May 2017			
