= India women's cricket team in England and Ireland in 2006 =

Indian women's cricket tour in 2006

Indian women's cricket team in Ireland in 2006
	Ireland	India
- Dates: 29 – 30 July 2006
Captains	Heather Whelan	Mithali Raj

One Day International series
- Results: India won the 2-match series 2–0
Most runs	Caitriona Beggs (63)	Mithali Raj (116)
Most wickets	4 bowlers (2)	Nooshin Al Khadeer (4)

The India women's national cricket team toured Ireland and England between July and September 2006. They played Ireland in 2 One Day Internationals, winning the series 2–0. They then played England in 1 Twenty20 International, 2 Test matches and 5 ODIs. England won the ODI series 4–0, whilst India won the Test series and T20I series, both 1–0.

England's Sarah Taylor set the record for the fastest cricketer, male of female, to earn their first cap in all three formats of international cricket, doing so in the space of nine days.

== Tour of Ireland ==
=== Squads ===
Ireland	India
Heather Whelan (c); Caitriona Beggs; Jill Whelan; Clare Shillington; Cecelia Joyce; Nicola Coffey; Eimear Richardson; Isobel Joyce; Jillian Smythe; Ciara Metcalfe; Emma Beamish; Jo Day	Mithali Raj (c); Nooshin Al Khadeer; Nidhi Buley; Anjum Chopra; Rumeli Dhar; Preeti Dimri; Jhulan Goswami; Karu Jain (wk); Hemlata Kala; Reema Malhotra; Sulakshana Naik (wk); Asha Rawat; Amita Sharma; Monica Sumra

=== WODI Series ===
==== 1st ODI ====
29 July 2006
Scorecard

India; 212/5 (48 overs)	v	Ireland; 105 (44.2 overs)
Karu Jain 56 (114); Heather Whelan 2/46 (10 overs)		Clare Shillington 31 (64); Nooshin Al Khadeer 2/21 (8 overs)

India Women won by 107 runs
Railway Union Cricket Club, Sandymount, Dublin
Umpires: Alan Tuffery (Ire) and Louis Fourie (Ire)

- Ireland Women won the toss and elected to field.
- Match reduced to 48 overs per side due to rain.
- Preeti Dimri (Ind) made her WODI debut.

==== 2nd ODI ====
30 July 2006
Scorecard

India; 239/4 (50 overs)	v	Ireland; 135/8 (40.2 overs)
Mithali Raj 66 (87); Jill Whelan 1/39 (10 overs)		Caitriona Beggs 63* (115); Nooshin Al Khadeer 2/20 (8 overs)

India Women won by 78 runs (DLS method)
The Vineyard, Dublin
Umpires: David Walsh (Ire) and Rodney Molins (Ire)

- Ireland Women won the toss and elected to field.
- Ireland Women target was 214 from 40 overs.
- Nidhi Buley (Ind) made her WODI debut.

== Tour of England ==
Indian women's cricket team in England in 2006
	England	India
- Dates: 2 August – 1 September 2006
Captains	Charlotte Edwards	Mithali Raj

Test series
- Result: India won the 2-match series 1–0
Most runs	Caroline Atkins (180)	Mithali Raj (134)
Most wickets	Laura Marsh (6); Jenny Gunn (6)	Jhulan Goswami (15)
- Player of the series: Jhulan Goswami (Ind)

One Day International series
- Results: England won the 5-match series 4–0
Most runs	Claire Taylor (225)	Mithali Raj (191)
Most wickets	Isa Guha (9)	Nooshin Al Khadeer (5)
- Player of the series: Jenny Gunn (Eng)

Twenty20 International series
- Results: India won the 1-match series 1–0
Most runs	Jenny Gunn (38)	Rumeli Dhar (66)
Most wickets	Katherine Brunt (1); Beth Morgan (1)	Jhulan Goswami (2)

=== Squads ===
England	India
Charlotte Edwards (c); Lynsey Askew; Caroline Atkins; Rosalie Birch; Katherine Brunt; Holly Colvin; Isa Guha; Jenny Gunn; Laura Marsh; Beth Morgan; Laura Newton; Jane Smit (wk); Claire Taylor; Sarah Taylor (wk)	Mithali Raj (c); Nooshin Al Khadeer; Nidhi Buley; Anjum Chopra; Rumeli Dhar; Preeti Dimri; Jhulan Goswami; Karu Jain (wk); Hemlata Kala; Reema Malhotra; Sulakshana Naik (wk); Asha Rawat; Amita Sharma; Monica Sumra

=== Tour matches ===
==== 50-over match: England A v India ====
2 August 2006
Scorecard

India; 128 (39.4 overs)	v	England A 70/1 (26 overs)
Mithali Raj 52 (93); Kathryn Doherty 3/21 (7 overs)		Steph Davies 27* (77); Amita Sharma 1/19 (5 overs)

England A Women won by 1 run (DLS method)
Uppingham School, Uppingham
Umpires: John James (Eng) and Alan Wilson (Eng)

- India Women won the toss and elected to bat.
- When play was halted due to rain, the England A Women target was 70.

==== 20-over match: Marylebone Cricket Club v India ====
3 August 2006
Scorecard

Marylebone Cricket Club; 117/6 (20 overs)	v	India; 118/4 (20 overs)
Ebony Rainford-Brent 26 (18); Nooshin Al Khadeer 3/16 (3 overs)		Hemlata Kala 39* (39); Natasha Miles 1/20 (5 overs)

India Women won by 6 wickets
Uppingham School, Uppingham
Umpires: John Harris (Eng) and John Hayes (Eng)

- India Women won the toss and elected to field.

==== 20-over match: Marylebone Cricket Club v India ====
3 August 2006
Scorecard

Marylebone Cricket Club; 96/8 (20 overs)	v	India; 97/7 (20 overs)
Beth Wild 22 (36); Preeti Dimri 4/6 (4 overs)		Rumeli Dhar 40 (–); Bev Nicholson 4/12 (4 overs)

India Women won by 3 wickets
Uppingham School, Uppingham
Umpires: John Harris (Eng) and John Hayes (Eng)

- Marylebone Cricket Club Women won the toss and elected to bat.

=== Only T20I ===
3 August 2006
Scorecard

England; 107/8 (20 overs)	v	India; 109/2 (19.2 overs)
Jenny Gunn 38 (52); Jhulan Goswami 2/14 (4 overs)		Rumeli Dhar 66* (69); Katherine Brunt 1/10 (4 overs)

India Women won by 8 wickets
County Ground, Derby
Umpires: George Sharp (Eng) and Neil Bainton (Eng)
Player of the match: Rumeli Dhar (Ind)

- India Women won the toss and elected to field.
- Lynsey Askew, Caroline Atkins, Sarah Taylor (Eng), Nooshin Al Khadeer, Anjum Chopra, Rumeli Dhar, Preeti Dimri, Jhulan Goswami Hemlata Kala, Reema Malhotra, Sulakshana Naik, Mithali Raj, Amita Sharma and Monica Sumra (Ind) all made their WT20I debuts.

=== Test Series ===
==== 1st Test ====
8 – 11 August 2006
Scorecard

England	v	India
223 (88.2 overs); Caroline Atkins 73 (146); Jhulan Goswami 3/46 (18.2 overs)		298 (138.1 overs); Hemlata Kala 69 (179); Laura Newton 3/57 (17.1 overs)
345/8d (102.3 overs); Claire Taylor 115 (233); Preeti Dimri 3/75 (25 overs)		187/8 (74 overs); Rumeli Dhar 57 (123); Laura Marsh 3/44 (18 overs)

Match drawn
Grace Road, Leicester
Umpires: Jeremy Lloyds (Eng) and Trevor Jesty (Eng)

- England Women won the toss and elected to bat.
- Laura Marsh, Sarah Taylor (Eng), Nidhi Buley and Preeti Dimri (Ind) all made their WTest debuts.

==== 2nd Test ====
29 August – 1 September 2006
Scorecard

India	v	England
307 (148.1 overs); Anjum Chopra 98 (295); Isa Guha 4/61 (40.1 overs)		99 (51 overs); Charlotte Edwards 26 (54); Jhulan Goswami 5/33 (13 overs)
98/5 (29.2 overs); Karu Jain 34 (59); Holly Colvin 2/26 (8 overs)		305 (160.2 overs) (f/o); Charlotte Edwards 105 (223); Jhulan Goswami 5/45 (36.2 overs)

India Women won by 5 wickets
County Ground, Taunton
Umpires: Neil Mallender (Eng) and Roy Palmer (Eng)

- India Women won the toss and elected to bat.
- Reema Malhotra (Ind) made her WTest debut.

=== WODI Series ===
==== 1st ODI ====
14 August 2006
Scorecard

England; 253/3 (48 overs)	v	India; 153/7 (48 overs)
Claire Taylor 156* (151); Nooshin Al Khadeer 1/65 (9 overs)		Mithali Raj 59 (111); Beth Morgan 3/39 (9 overs)

England Women won by 100 runs
Lord's, London
Umpires: Barrie Leadbeater (Eng) and Pasty Harris (Eng)

- India Women won the toss and elected to field.
- Match reduced to 48 overs per side due to rain.
- Holly Colvin and Sarah Taylor (Eng) both made their WODI debuts.

==== 2nd ODI ====
17 August 2006
Scorecard

England; 42/2 (16 overs)	v	India
Laura Newton 24* (41); Amita Sharma 1/14 (7 overs)

No result
Denis Compton Oval, Shenley
Umpires: Martin Bodenham (Eng) and Richard Illingworth (Eng)

- India Women won the toss and elected to field.
- No further play possible due to rain.
- Laura Marsh (Eng) made her WODI debut.

==== 3rd ODI ====
19 August 2006
Scorecard

India; 185/6 (50 overs)	v	England; 188/5 (49.2 overs)
Mithali Raj 73 (103); Isa Guha 4/29 (10 overs)		Charlotte Edwards 47 (61); Preeti Dimri 2/25 (10 overs)

England Women won by 5 wickets
Arundel Castle Cricket Ground, Arundel
Umpires: Barrie Leadbeater (Eng) and Martin Bodenham (Eng)

- England Women won the toss and elected to field.

==== 4th ODI ====
24 August 2006
Scorecard

India; 192/8 (50 overs)	v	England; 195/7 (45.4 overs)
Anjum Chopra 53 (113); Jenny Gunn 1/16 (7 overs)		Sarah Taylor 61 (63); Jhulan Goswami 3/20 (10 overs)

England Women won by 3 wickets
Rose Bowl, Southampton
Umpires: Graham Burgess (Eng) and Richard Illingworth (Eng)
Player of the match: Sarah Taylor (Eng)

- England Women won the toss and elected to field.

==== 5th ODI ====
24 August 2006
Scorecard

India; 131 (47.4 overs)	v	England; 132/3 (37.5 overs)
Anjum Chopra 44 (118); Isa Guha 3/22 (10 overs)		Laura Newton 41 (62); Preeti Dimri 2/21 (10 overs)

England Women won by 7 wickets
Rose Bowl, Southampton
Umpires: Graham Burgess (Eng) and Richard Illingworth (Eng)
Player of the match: Isa Guha (Eng)

- India Women won the toss and elected to bat.
