= 2016–17 Indian cricket season =

2016-17 Indian Cricket Season
Ranji Trophy
- Champions: Gujarat
- Runners-up: Mumbai

Vijay Hazare Trophy
- Champions: Tamil Nadu
- Runners-up: Bengal

Syed Mushtaq Ali Trophy (Inter-Zonal)
- Champions: East Zone
- Runners-up: Central Zone

The 2016–17 Indian cricket season was the 124th cricket season since the commencement of first-class cricket in India. The season started early in September 2016 and lasted up to March 2017. The season included tours from New Zealand, England, West Indies women, England U-19, Bangladesh and Australia. India also played host to a bilateral series between Afghanistan and Ireland.

International tours
Start date	Against	Results [Matches]		
Start date	Against	Test	ODI	T20I
16 September 2016	New Zealand	3-0 [3]	3-2 [5]	—
9 November 2016	England	4-0 [5]	2-1 [3]	2-1 [3]
10 November 2016	West Indies women	—	3-0 [3]	0-3 [3]
28 January 2017	England U-19	0-0 [2]	3-1 [5]	—
5 February 2017	Bangladesh	1-0 [1]	—	—
17 February 2017	Australia	2-1 [4]	—	—
Neutral venue matches
Start date	Against	Results [Matches]		
Start date	Against	F/C	ODI	T20I
8 March 2017	(India) Afghanistan vs (Republic of Ireland) Ireland	1-0 [1]	3-2 [5]	3-0 [3]

== Squads ==
=== Men's Squad ===
Following 34 cricketers, listed alphabetically, featured in at-least 1 match among the 24 international matches played in India during the season.

Player	Mat	Role	Format	Runs	HS	Bat Av	100	Wkts	BBI	Bowl Av	5	Ct	St
R Ashwin	16	All-rounder	Test, ODI	480	72	26.66	0	85	7/59	26.60	7	7	0
JJ Bumrah	10	Bowler	ODI, T20I	0	0*	0.00	0	16	3/14	26.25	0	3	0
YS Chahal	3	Bowler	T20I	-	-	-	-	8	6/25	10.62	1	0	0
S Dhawan	3	Batsman	Test, ODI	30	17	7.50	0	-	-	-	-	1	0
MS Dhoni (C)	11	Wicket-keeper	ODI, T20I	454	134	45.40	1	-	-	-	-	9	6
G Gambhir	2	Batsman	Test	108	50	27.00	0	-	-	-	-	0	0
RA Jadeja	16	All-rounder	Test, ODI	595	90	39.66	0	75	7/48	23.70	4	12	0
KM Jadhav	8	All-rounder	ODI	322	120	64.40	1	6	3/29	23.50	0	3	0
V Kohli (C)	23	Batsman	Test, ODI, T20I	1847	235	65.96	6	-	-	-	-	18	0
Kuldeep Yadav	1	Bowler	Test	7	7	7.00	0	4	4/68	22.75	0	1	0
DS Kulkarni	1	Bowler	ODI	25	25*	-	0	1	1/59	59.00	0	0	0
B Kumar	6	Bowler	Test, ODI	37	23	9.25	0	11	5/48	35.45	1	1	0
A Mishra	9	Bowler	Test, ODI, T20I	15	14	3.75	0	22	5/18	24.45	1	2	0
Mohammed Shami	6	Bowler	Test	50	19	12.50	0	18	3/46	27.50	0	2	0
A Mukund	1	Batsman	Test	16	16	8.00	0	-	-	-	-	0	0
KK Nair	6	Batsman	Test	374	303*	62.33	1	0	-	-	0	6	0
A Nehra	3	Bowler	T20I	-	-	-	-	3	3/28	27.66	0	0	0
MK Pandey	7	Batsman	ODI, T20I	109	30	18.16	0	-	-	-	-	1	0
HH Pandya	10	All-rounder	ODI, T20I	182	56	30.33	0	9	3/31	36.11	0	4	0
RR Pant	1	Batsman	T20I	5	5*	-	0	-	-	-	-	1	0
Parvez Rasool	1	Bowler	T20I	5	5	5.00	0	1	1/32	32.00	0	0	0
AR Patel	5	Bowler	ODI	79	38	26.33	0	4	2/9	46.50	0	1	0
PA Patel	3	Wicket-keeper	Test	195	71	65.00	0	-	-	-	-	11	2
CA Pujara	13	Batsman	Test	1316	202	62.66	4	-	-	-	-	8	0
AM Rahane (C)	17	Batsman	Test, ODI	862	188	35.91	1	-	-	-	-	19	0
KL Rahul	15	Batsman	Test, ODI, T20I	833	199	41.65	1	-	-	-	-	7	0
SK Raina	3	All-rounder	T20I	104	63	34.66	0	0	-	-	0	4	0
WP Saha	10	Wicket-keeper	Test	441	117	44.10	2	-	-	-	-	25	1
I Sharma	5	Bowler	Test	8	6	2.66	0	9	2/40	41.88	0	1	0
RG Sharma	8	Batsman	Test, ODI	361	82	45.12	0	0	-	-	0	5	0
M Vijay	12	Batsman	Test	771	136	36.71	3	0	-	-	0	12	0
J Yadav	5	Bowler	Test, ODI	229	104	45.80	1	12	3/30	31.25	0	2	0
UT Yadav	18	Bowler	Test, ODI	95	18*	10.55	0	39	4/32	35.94	0	10	0
Yuvraj Singh	6	All-rounder	ODI, T20I	253	150	42.16	1	0	-	-	0	0	0

=== Women's squad ===
Player	Mat	Runs	HS	100	Wkts	BBI	5	Ct	St
E Bisht	6	-	-	-	7	3/14	0	2	0
RS Gayakwad	3	-	-	-	9	4/21	0	0	0
J Goswami	6	32	18	0	3	2/28	0	2	0
MDT Kamini	1	2	2	0	-	-	-	0	0
H Kaur	6	197	68*	0	1	1/16	0	2	0
V Krishnamurthy	6	217	71	0	-	-	-	0	0
S Mandhana	6	77	44	0	-	-	-	0	0
MR Meshram	1	2	2	0	-	-	-	0	0
S Meghana	2	36	19	0	-	-	-	2	0
S Pandey	3	5	5	0	7	3/31	0	0	0
SK Parida	1	-	-	-	0	-	0	0	0
AA Patil	3	0	0*	0	0	-	0	1	0
Poonam Yadav	2	-	-	-	2	2/25	0	0	0
NM Parween	3	1	1	0	-	-	-	1	1
Preeti Bose	2	2	2*	0	1	1/20	0	0	0
M Raj	3	106	46*	0	-	-	-	0	0
DB Sharma	4	95	32	0	2	1/27	0	0	0
DP Vaidya	1	32	32*	0	1	1/20	0	0	0
VR Vanitha	2	3	3	0	-	-	-	1	0
S Verma	3	4	4*	0	-	-	-	2	0

== September ==
=== New Zealand in India ===
Tour Match
Date	Team 1	Captain 1	Team 2	Captain 2	Venue	Result
16-18 September	Mumbai	Aditya Tare	New Zealanders	Kane Williamson	Feroz Shah Kotla, Delhi	Match Drawn

Test series
No.	Date	Home captain	Away captain	Venue	Result
Test 2221	22–26 September	Virat Kohli	Kane Williamson	Green Park Stadium, Kanpur	India by 197 runs
Test 2222	30 September–4 October	Virat Kohli	Ross Taylor	Eden Gardens, Kolkata	India by 178 runs
Test 2223	8–12 October	Virat Kohli	Kane Williamson	Holkar Stadium, Indore	India by 321 runs
ODI series
No.	Date	Home captain	Away captain	Venue	Result
ODI 3796	16 October	MS Dhoni	Kane Williamson	Himachal Pradesh Cricket Association Stadium, Dharamshala	India by 6 wickets
ODI 3797	20 October	MS Dhoni	Kane Williamson	Feroz Shah Kotla Ground, Delhi	New Zealand by 6 runs
ODI 3798	23 October	MS Dhoni	Kane Williamson	Punjab Cricket Association IS Bindra Stadium, Mohali	India by 7 wickets
ODI 3799	26 October	MS Dhoni	Kane Williamson	JSCA International Stadium Complex, Ranchi	New Zealand by 19 runs
ODI 3800	29 October	MS Dhoni	Kane Williamson	Dr. Y.S. Rajasekhara Reddy ACA-VDCA Cricket Stadium, Visakhapatnam	India by 190 runs

== November ==
=== England in India ===
2016 Anthony De Mello Trophy – Test series
No.	Date	Home captain	Away captain	Venue	Result
Test 2232	9–13 November	Virat Kohli	Alastair Cook	Saurashtra Cricket Association Stadium, Rajkot	Match drawn
Test 2235	17–21 November	Virat Kohli	Alastair Cook	Dr. Y.S. Rajasekhara Reddy ACA-VDCA Cricket Stadium, Visakhapatnam	India by 246 runs
Test 2238	26–30 November	Virat Kohli	Alastair Cook	Punjab Cricket Association IS Bindra Stadium, Mohali	India by 8 wickets
Test 2239	8–12 December	Virat Kohli	Alastair Cook	Wankhede Stadium, Mumbai	India by an innings and 36 runs
Test 2241	16–20 December	Virat Kohli	Alastair Cook	M. A. Chidambaram Stadium, Chennai	India by an innings and 75 runs
ODI series
No.	Date	Home captain	Away captain	Venue	Result
ODI 3819	15 January	Virat Kohli	Eoin Morgan	Maharashtra Cricket Association Stadium, Pune	India by 3 wickets
ODI 3821	19 January	Virat Kohli	Eoin Morgan	Barabati Stadium, Cuttack	India by 15 runs
ODI 3823	22 January	Virat Kohli	Eoin Morgan	Eden Gardens, Kolkata	England by 5 runs
T20I series
No.	Date	Home captain	Away captain	Venue	Result
T20I 592	26 January	Virat Kohli	Eoin Morgan	Green Park Stadium, Kanpur	England by 7 wickets
T20I 593	29 January	Virat Kohli	Eoin Morgan	Vidarbha Cricket Association Stadium, Nagpur	India by 5 runs
T20I 594	1 February	Virat Kohli	Eoin Morgan	M. Chinnaswamy Stadium, Bangalore	India by 75 runs

Tour Match
Date	Team 1	Captain 1	Team 2	Captain 2	Venue	Result
10 January	India A	MS Dhoni	England XI	Eoin Morgan	Brabourne Stadium, Mumbai	England XI won by 3 wickets (with 7 balls remaining)
12 January	India A	Ajinkya Rahane	England XI	Eoin Morgan	Brabourne Stadium, Mumbai	India A won by 6 wickets (with 62 balls remaining)

=== West Indies Women in India ===
WODI series
No.	Date	Home captain	Away captain	Venue	Result
WODI 1010	10 November	Mithali Raj	Stafanie Taylor	Mulapadu Cricket Ground, Vijayawada	India by 6 wickets
WODI 1014	14 November	Mithali Raj	Stafanie Taylor	Mulapadu Cricket Ground, Vijayawada	India by 5 wickets
WODI 1016	16 November	Mithali Raj	Stafanie Taylor	Mulapadu Cricket Ground, Vijayawada	India by 15 runs
WT20I series
No.	Date	Home captain	Away captain	Venue	Result
WT20I 370	18 November	Harmanpreet Kaur	Stafanie Taylor	Mulapadu Cricket Ground, Vijayawada	West Indies by 6 wickets
WT20I 371	20 November	Harmanpreet Kaur	Stafanie Taylor	Mulapadu Cricket Ground, Vijayawada	West Indies by 31 runs
WT20I 373	22 November	Harmanpreet Kaur	Stafanie Taylor	Mulapadu Cricket Ground, Vijayawada	West Indies by 15 runs

== January ==
=== Irani Cup ===
Irani Cup
Date	Team 1	Captain 1	Team 2	Captain 2	Venue	Result
20-24 January	Gujarat	Parthiv Patel	Rest of India	CA Pujara	Cricket Club of India, Mumbai	Rest of India Won by 6 Wickets

=== England U-19 in India ===
YODI series
No.	Date	Home captain	Away captain	Venue	Result
1	30 January	Abhishek Sharma	Matthew Fisher	Wankhede Stadium, Mumbai	England Under-19s won by 23 runs
2	1 February	Abhishek Sharma	Matthew Fisher	Brabourne Stadium, Mumbai	India Under-19s won by 129 runs
3	3 February	Himanshu Rana	Max Holden	Brabourne Stadium, Mumbai	India Under-19s won by 7 wickets (with 35 balls remaining)
4	6 February	Himanshu Rana	Matthew Fisher	Wankhede Stadium, Mumbai	India Under-19s won by 230 runs
5	8 February	Abhishek Sharma	Max Holden	Wankhede Stadium, Mumbai	Match tied
YTest series
No.	Date	Home captain	Away captain	Venue	Result
1	13-16 February	Jonty Sidhu	Max Holden	Vidarbha Cricket Association Stadium, Nagpur	Match drawn
2	21-24 February	Jonty Sidhu	Max Holden	Vidarbha Cricket Association Stadium, Nagpur	Match drawn

== February ==
=== Bangladesh in India ===
Tour Match
Date	Team 1	Captain 1	Team 2	Captain 2	Venue	Result
5-6 February	India A	Abhinav Mukund	Bangladesh	Mushfiqur Rahim	Gymkhana Ground, Secunderabad	Match drawn

Test series
No.	Date	Home captain	Away captain	Venue	Result
Test 2249	9–13 February	Virat Kohli	Mushfiqur Rahim	Rajiv Gandhi International Cricket Stadium, Hyderabad	India by 208 runs

=== Australia in India ===
Tour Match
Date	Team 1	Captain 1	Team 2	Captain 2	Venue	Result
17-19 February	India A	Hardik Pandya	Australia	Steve Smith	Brabourne Stadium, Mumbai	Match drawn

2016-17 Border–Gavaskar Trophy - Test series
No.	Date	Home captain	Away captain	Venue	Result
Test 2250	23–27 February	Virat Kohli	Steve Smith	Maharashtra Cricket Association Stadium, Pune	Australia by 333 runs
Test 2251	4–8 March	Virat Kohli	Steve Smith	M. Chinnaswamy Stadium, Bangalore	India by 75 runs
Test 2256	16–20 March	Virat Kohli	Steve Smith	JSCA International Stadium Complex, Ranchi	Match drawn
Test 2258	25–29 March	Ajinkya Rahane	Steve Smith	Himachal Pradesh Cricket Association Stadium, Dharamshala	India by 8 wickets

== March ==
=== Ireland vs. Afghanistan in India ===
T20I series
No.	Date	Home captain	Away captain	Venue	Result
T20I 599	8 March	Asghar Stanikzai	William Porterfield	Greater Noida Sports Complex Ground, Greater Noida	Afghanistan by 6 wickets
T20I 600	10 March	Asghar Stanikzai	William Porterfield	Greater Noida Sports Complex Ground, Greater Noida	Afghanistan by 17 runs (D/L)
T20I 601	12 March	Asghar Stanikzai	William Porterfield	Greater Noida Sports Complex Ground, Greater Noida	Afghanistan by 28 runs
ODI series
No.	Date	Home captain	Away captain	Venue	Result
ODI 3850	15 March	Asghar Stanikzai	William Porterfield	Greater Noida Sports Complex Ground, Greater Noida	Afghanistan by 30 runs
ODI 3851	17 March	Asghar Stanikzai	William Porterfield	Greater Noida Sports Complex Ground, Greater Noida	Afghanistan by 34 runs
ODI 3852	19 March	Asghar Stanikzai	William Porterfield	Greater Noida Sports Complex Ground, Greater Noida	Ireland by 6 wickets
ODI 3853	22 March	Asghar Stanikzai	William Porterfield	Greater Noida Sports Complex Ground, Greater Noida	Ireland by 3 wickets
ODI 3854	24 March	Asghar Stanikzai	William Porterfield	Greater Noida Sports Complex Ground, Greater Noida	Afghanistan by 7 wickets
2015–17 ICC Intercontinental Cup - FC series
No.	Date	Home captain	Away captain	Venue	Result
First-class	28–31 March	Asghar Stanikzai	William Porterfield	Greater Noida Sports Complex Ground, Greater Noida	Afghanistan by an innings and 172 runs
