= Preeti Dimri =

Indian cricketer (born 1986)

Personal information
- Full name: Preeti Dharmanand Dimri
- Born: 18 October 1986 (age 40); Agra, India
- Nickname: Dolly
- Batting: Left-handed
- Bowling: Slow left-arm unorthodox
- Role: Bowler

International information
- National side: India (2006–2010)
- Test debut (cap 71): 8 August 2006 v England
- Last Test: 29 August 2006 v England
- ODI debut (cap 81): 29 July 2006 v Ireland
- Last ODI: 5 March 2007 v England
- Only T20I (cap 4): 5 August 2006 v England

Domestic team information
- Years: Team
- 1999/00: Uttar Pradesh
- 2006/07–2011/12: Railways
- 2012/13: Uttar Pradesh
- 2013/14–2014/15: Rajasthan

Career statistics
Competition	WTest	WODI	WT20I	WLA
Matches	2	23	1	131
Runs scored	19	23	–	195
Batting average	19.00	11.50	–	8.86
100s/50s	0/0	0/0	–	0/0
Top score	19	12*	–	25
Balls bowled	468	1,217	24	6,746
Wickets	5	28	1	193
Bowling average	36.40	23.21	19.00	14.71
5 wickets in innings	0	0	0	2
10 wickets in match	0	0	0	0
Best bowling	3/75	3/14	1/19	5/9
Catches/stumpings	0/–	4/–	0/–	33/–
- Source: CricketArchive, 31 August 2022

Preeti Dharmanand Dimri (born 18 October 1986) is an Indian former cricketer who played as a slow left-arm unorthodox bowler. She appeared in two Test matches, 23 One Day Internationals and one Twenty20 International for India between 2006 and 2010. She played domestic cricket for Uttar Pradesh, Railways and Railways.

She made her debut in international cricket during India's tour of the British Isles on 29 July 2006 in a WODI against Ireland at Park Avenue, Dublin. She earned her first cap in all three formats of international cricket in the space of ten days.
