= Subramaniam Badrinath =

Indian cricketer (born 1980)

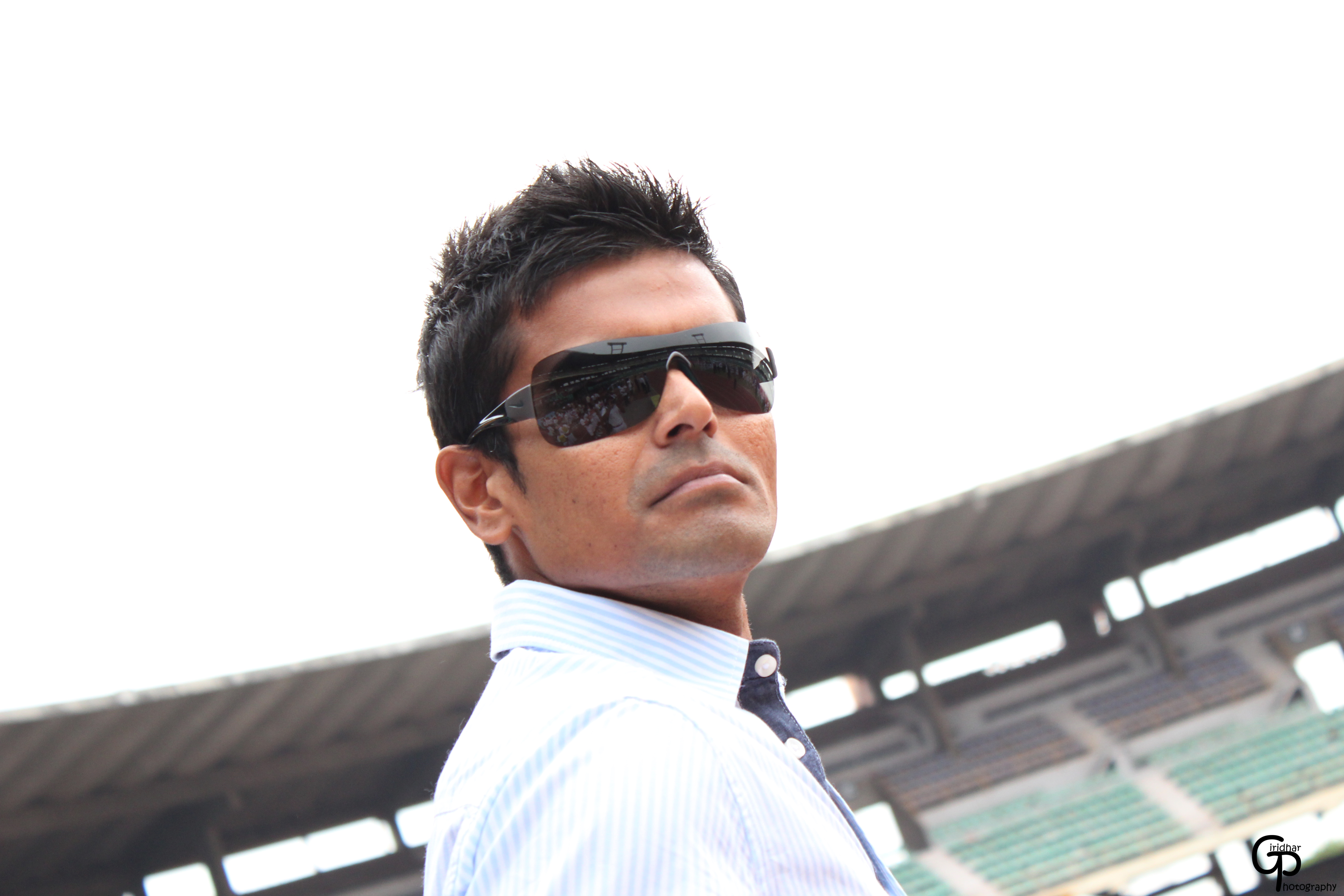
- Subramaniam Badrinath

Personal information
- Born: 30 August 1980 (age 46); Madras (now Chennai), Tamil Nadu, India
- Height: 5 ft 11 in (1.80 m)
- Batting: Right-handed
- Bowling: Right-arm off break
- Role: Batsman

International information
- National side: India (2008–2011)
- Test debut (cap 262): 6 February 2010 v South Africa
- Last Test: 14 February 2010 v South Africa
- ODI debut (cap 176): 20 August 2008 v Sri Lanka
- Last ODI: 13 June 2011 v West Indies
- Only T20I (cap 35): 4 June 2011 v West Indies

Domestic team information
- Years: Team
- 2000–2014: Tamil Nadu
- 2014–2016: Vidarbha
- 2016–2017: Hyderabad
- 2008–2013: Chennai Super Kings

Career statistics
Competition	Test	ODI	T20I	FC
Matches	2	7	1	145
Runs scored	63	79	43	10,245
Batting average	21.00	15.80	43.00	54.49
100s/50s	0/1	0/0	0/0	32/45
Top score	56	27	43	250
Balls bowled	0	0	0	1,359
Wickets	0	0	0	14
Bowling average	–	–	–	52.92
5 wickets in innings	0	0	0	0
10 wickets in match	0	–	–	0
Best bowling	–	–	–	2/19
Catches/stumpings	2/–	2/–	0/–	96/–
- Source: ESPNcricinfo, 10 May 2024

Subramaniam Badrinath (born 30 August 1980) is a former Indian international cricketer. He is a right-handed middle order batter and an occasional right-arm off break bowler. He represented the Indian cricket team and was named in the 30 man provisional squad for the 2007 Cricket World Cup but did not make it to the final squad. He has played for Tamil Nadu, Vidarbha, Hyderabad and South zone in domestic cricket. He has also played for Chennai Super Kings and Royal Challengers Bangalore in the Indian Premier League (IPL). He has also represented the Indian Board President's XI on several occasions.

== Early life and family ==
Badrinath was born on 30 August 1980 to S Subramaniam and Karpakam at Madras, Tamil Nadu in a Tamil brahmin family. He did his schooling from Padma Seshadri Bala Bhavan and college at Guru Nanak College in Chennai. Badrinath is married to Suneethi Pinglay.

== Career ==
=== International ===
Badrinath represented India A before his debut with the Indian cricket team. Badrinath was named in the provisional 30-man squad for the 2007 Cricket World Cup and 2009 ICC World Twenty20 but did not make it to the final squad on both the occasions. In August 2008, Badrinath made his ODI debut for India against Sri Lanka in the second ODI at Dambulla during the Indian tour of Sri Lanka. He scored an unbeaten 27 to guide India to victory. In February 2010, Badrinath made his test debut against South Africa at the age of 29. He scored a fifty on debut in the match at VCA Stadium in Nagpur. He was also part of the team that played the second test match in the series played at Eden Gardens, Kolkata. India won the match but Badrinath scored a single run in the only innings which turned out to be the last of his short test career. While he was called up to the test squad as a replacement for the retired V. V. S. Laxman to play New Zealand during the tour of India in 2012, he did not make it to the playing eleven.

Badrinath played seven ODIs scoring 72 runs with a highest score of 27. His last ODI match came against West Indies at Sir Vivian Richards Stadium in North Sound on 13 June 2011. Badrinath played his only T20 international against West Indies at Queen's Park Oval at Port of Spain on 4 June 2011 scoring 43 runs and winning the Man of the match award in an Indian victory.

=== Domestic ===
Badrinath made his debut for Tamil Nadu in the 2000–01 season and was a prolific scorer in first class cricket scoring more than ten thousand runs with 32 centuries. Badrinath reached the finals of Ranji Trophy three times with Tamil Nadu in the 2002-03, 2003-04 and 2011-12 seasons. Badrinath was the second highest run scorer with 636 runs in the 2005-06 Ranji Trophy and had the most prolific season in 2007-08 when he scored 659 runs at 65.90. He was also part of the team that won the domestic one day cup two times in 2002-03 and 2004–05 and the Vijay Hazare Trophy during the 2008–09 and 2009–10 seasons. Badrinath also represented South Zone while also captaining the side.

In 2014, after representing Tamil Nadu for over 14 years, he moved to represent Vidarbha for the 2014–15 Ranji Trophy due to limited playing opportunities with Tamil Nadu. He was appointed captain of the Vidarbha side, leading them to the quarter finals where they lost to Tamil Nadu. In the 2015-16 Ranji Trophy, Vidarbha again reached the quarter finals before losing to Saurashtra. Badrinath moved on to Hyderabad cricket team for the 2016-17 season, where he was again appointed captain. He led the side to the quarter finals in the Ranji trophy before falling for the third consecutive year, losing to Mumbai. In August 2018, he retired from all forms of cricket.

=== IPL ===
Before the inaugural season, Badrinath was signed by the Indian Premier League (IPL) side Chennai Super Kings (CSK) in 2008. Badrinath made his debut for the Chennai Super Kings during the 2008 season and was a reliable middle order batsman, representing the team for six consecutive seasons till 2013. His break through season came in 2011 when he scored 356 runs to help Chennai win their second consecutive IPL title. Badrinath won two IPL titles in 2010 and 2011 along with a Champions League Twenty20 title in 2010 with Chennai Super Kings. Badrinath scored 1441 runs across six seasons at an average of just above 30.

Badrinath was not retained by Chennai Super Kings ahead of the 2014 Indian Premier League season and he was unsold in 2014 player auction. He was later picked up by Royal Challengers Bangalore for 2015 Indian Premier League season but did not play a single game in which turned out to be his last season.

== Post-retirement ==
He currently runs a YouTube channel "Cric it with Badri" and is an active commentator in Star Sports Tamil.
