= Sanjay Hazare =

Indian former cricketer (born 1961)

Personal information
- Full name: Sanjay Sukhanand Hazare
- Born: 18 February 1961 (age 65); Baroda, Gujarat, India
- Batting: Right-handed
- Bowling: Legbreak googly

Domestic team information
- Years: Team
- 1981–1998: Baroda

Umpiring information
- ODIs umpired: 5 (2009–2010)
- T20Is umpired: 1 (2009)
- WODIs umpired: 1 (2012)
- FC umpired: 39 (1995–2011)
- LA umpired: 35 (1995–2012)

Career statistics
Competition	First-class	List A
Matches	48	6
Runs scored	778	56
Batting average	15.25	18.66
100s/50s	0/1	0/0
Top score	65	23
Balls bowled	7,036	108
Wickets	108	1
Bowling average	33.08	112.00
5 wickets in innings	8	0
10 wickets in match	1	0
Best bowling	6/46	1/59
Catches/stumpings	18/–	1/–
- Source: CricketArchive, 10 August 2012

Sanjay Sukhanand Hazare (born 18 February 1961) is an Indian former cricketer and umpire.

== Early life ==
He was born in Vadodara, Gujarat in 1961. Several members of his family have been cricket players; his uncle Vijay Hazare was an Indian cricket captain.

== Playing career ==
Hazare played 48 First-class matches and six List A matches for Baroda between 1981 and 1998.

== Umpiring career ==
He is currently a cricket umpire, who has officiated in five One Day Internationals, one Twenty20 International match and 16 Indian Premier League matches.

He was dropped from the IPL 2014 following his not-out decision of Kevin Pieterson when, as the square-leg umpire, Hazare chose not to use the technology at his disposal in making the decision.

Hazare is the first International umpire from Vadodara, and second from Gujarat, after Amish Saheba. He has served as a TV umpire in three Test matches, and has been a reserve umpire in one Test match. He has also acted as a TV umpire in 12 ODIs and in one T20I; and as reserve umpire in one ODI.

International Cricket Council (ICC) made him a part of the International Panel of ICC Umpires on 2 August 2009. Samarjitsinh Gaekwad, the then vice-president of the Board of Control for Cricket in India (BCCI), said, "Hazare has a good umpiring record and his name was discussed during the meet of umpires committee of BCCI. He was selected considering his talent and we are proud to have an international umpire with us now." About his selection, Hazare said,"It is due to the efforts of senior Baroda Cricket Association (BCA) officials that I made it to the panel," adding,"I have been conveyed about my selection by BCA authorities, but I am yet to receive official letter from BCCI." However the BCCI didn't recommended his name for the 2011 cricket season, citing his performance, which was evaluated by the match referees of the ICC.

== See also ==
- List of One Day International cricket umpires
- List of Twenty20 International cricket umpires
