= Vipin Pubby =

Vipin Pubby (born 5 January 1956) is a former Resident Editor of The Indian Express, Chandigarh.

Pubby is an alumnus of Chail Military School. He did post graduation in English from Panjab University, Chandigarh. He has been a journalist since 1979 and has extensively covered the political and social developments in the Indian states of Jammu and Kashmir, Gujarat, North-Eastern states, Himachal Pradesh, Haryana and Punjab.

He has been the Founder President of the Shimla Press Club.

He is also the author of the book Shimla Then and Now.
