= Imtiaz Ahmed (Jammu and Kashmir cricketer) =

Indian cricketer

Personal information
- Full name: Imtiaz Ahmed
- Role: Batsman

Domestic team information
- Years: Team
- 1996–2002: Jammu and Kashmir

Career statistics
Competition	FC	LA
Matches	4	1
Runs scored	101	19
Batting average	12.62	19.00
100s/50s	0/0	0/0
Top score	40	19
Catches/stumpings	2/-	0/-
- Source: CricketArchive, 8 July 2013

Imtiaz Ahmed (date of birth unknown) was an Indian cricketer who played several matches for Jammu and Kashmir during the late 1990s and early 2000s. Imtiaz made his first-class debut in October 1996, against Punjab in the 1996–97 edition of the Ranji Trophy. A lower-order batsman, he played a further match in the following season's tournament, and also a single List A match in the limited-overs Ranji One-Day Trophy. Imtiaz did not play any further matches for Jammu and Kashmir until the 2002–03 season, which were to be his final two at first-class level. He finished his career with 101 runs from four matches at first-class level, with his highest score an innings of 40 runs against Madhya Pradesh in December 2002.
