= Sayim Mustafa =

Indian cricketer (born 1991)

Personal information
- Full name: Sayim Mustafa Mohsin
- Born: 28 October 1991 (age 35); Srinagar, India
- Batting: Right-handed
- Bowling: Right-arm fast-medium
- Source: ESPNcricinfo, 31 January 2017

Sayim Mustafa (born 28 October 1991) is an Indian cricketer. He made his Twenty20 debut for Jammu and Kashmir in the 2016–17 Inter State Twenty-20 Tournament on 31 January 2017. He contested the 2024 Lok Sabha election from Srinagar constituency and lost, having received 8,880 votes.
