= Amjad Khan (American cricketer) =

Indian-born American cricketer

Personal information
- Full name: Amjad Khan
- Born: 21 August 1966 (age 60); Srinagar, Jammu and Kashmir
- Batting: Right-handed
- Bowling: Right-arm medium-fast
- Role: Wicket-keeper

International information
- National side: United States

Domestic team information
- Years: Team
- 1988/89: Jammu and Kashmir

Career statistics
Competition	First-class	List A
Matches	2	4
Runs scored	42	61
Batting average	10.50	15.25
100s/50s	0/0	0/0
Top score	22	36
Balls bowled	–	63
Wickets	–	1
Bowling average	–	50.00
5 wickets in innings	–	0
10 wickets in match	–	0
Best bowling	–	1/45
Catches/stumpings	3/–	0/–
- Source: ESPNcricinfo, 3 February 2011

Amjad Khan (born 21 August 1966) is a former Indian-born American cricketer. Khan played as a right-handed batsman who bowled right-arm medium-fast and who could occasionally field as a wicket-keeper.

He was born in Srinagar, Jammu and Kashmir, India and made his first-class debut for Jammu and Kashmir in the 1988/89 Ranji Trophy against Delhi. He made one further first-class appearance for the state that season, which came against Haryana. In his two matches for the state, he scored 42 runs at a batting average of 10.50, with a high score of 22. The following year in 1989, Jammu and Kashmir did not participate in the Ranji Trophy due to the political unrest.

In 1990, he left India for the United States of America to find a better life. Playing for the New York Eagles, a Caribbean-centred club, he led them to three championship's in the Commonwealth Cricket League, the largest league in America. In 1996, Khan moved to Northern California and continued his run scoring spree on the west coast as well. A prolific run scorer in American domestic Cricket for close to two decades, Khan holds the record high score for a batsman in North America when he scored 304* in a quarter final match for United Cricket Club against Berkeley Cricket Club in the Northern California Cricket Association in 1999, although this match is not a senior match. He is one of only three players to have scored a triple century in any form of limited overs cricket. Amjad achieved another unique feat on 30 September 2012 when he scored the "Fastest century in US cricket history". Archived from the original on 9 July 2017. in the final of the Eastern American Cricket Association's Twenty/20 Blitz. Playing the final at Baisley Pond Park, in Richmond Hill, New York, Khan scored his century against Richmond Hill CC and it took him just 56 balls to reach the hundred that included 9 fours and 7 sixes.

He was selected to play for the United States in the 2000/01 Red Stripe Bowl. The matches in this competition had List A status, as such his List A debut came against Jamaica. He played three further List A matches in the tournament, the last of which came against Trinidad and Tobago. In his four List A matches for the United States, Khan scored 61 runs at an average of 15.25, with a high score of 36. He took a single wicket with the ball at a bowling average of 50 and best figures of 1/45. His final match for the United States came in a Man of the Match performance in the 2002 ICC Americas Championship against Bermuda that was played in Buenos Aires, Argentina.

Khan never played for the USA again and paid the price for his outspoken and open criticism of the current United States of America Cricket Association administration, led by Gladstone Dainty. In January 2010, he again criticised the United States of America Cricket Association and its president Gladstone Dainty on cricket website Cricinfo.

Khan currently lives with his family on Long Island, New York, where he works for Microsoft.
