= Mehjoor Ali =

Indian cricketer (born 1991)

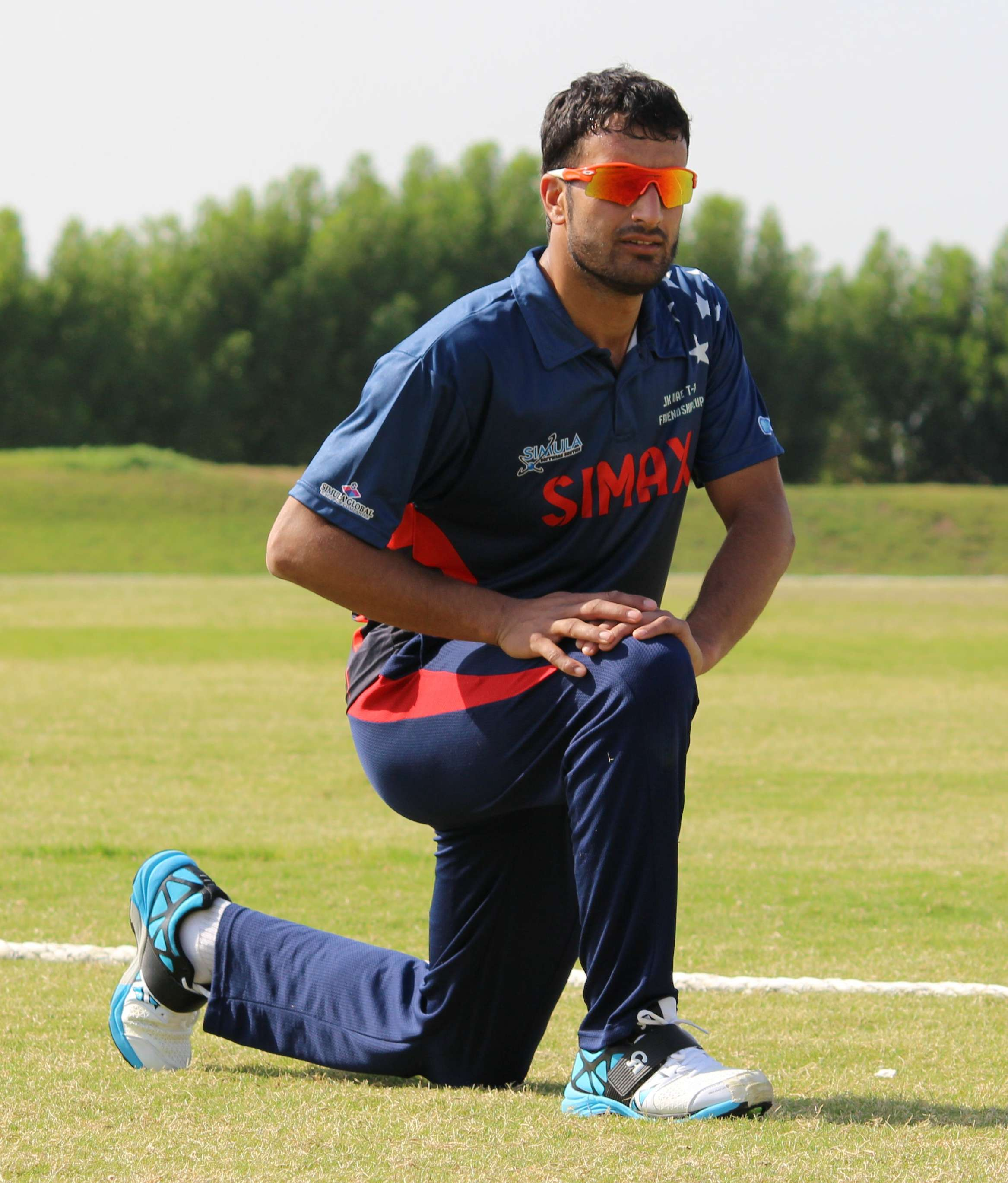
- Mehjoor during a warm up session before play Dubai Friendship Cup in UAE

Personal information
- Full name: Mehjoor Ali Sofi
- Born: 15 April 1991 (age 35); Srinagar, Jammu and Kashmir, India
- Nickname: Shani
- Batting: Right-handed
- Bowling: Right-arm medium
- Role: Bowler

Domestic team information
- Years: Team
- 2007-2017: Jammu and Kashmir
- 2013: Air India
- Source: ESPNcricinfo, 9 May 2016

Mehjoor Ali Sofi (born 15 April 1991) is an Indian cricketer who plays as medium pacer. He has the speed and swing to rattle the best in the business. He played 1 first-class 4 List A and 5 Twenty20 matches for Jammu and Kashmir cricket team from 2014.

Mehjoor has also played for various clubs across India which includes CC&FC, Rajasthan Club Kolkata, Air India and Bangkok International Sixes Tournament for CC&FC in 2013.

His cricketing style is characterized by raw pace, the ability to move the ball in both directions, a high-arm bowling action, and the capacity to extract bounce from awkward lengths.

== Early years ==
After Passing his school exam of class 10th Mehjoor joined M.P. Higher Secondary School Srinagar for higher studies. In the same joined Imtiaz Ahmed Cricket Academy in Bengaluru for three months joiner level coaching camp after which Imtiaz Ahmed praised his bowling and wished him to stay for his bright future but Mehjoor returned home and wished to play for his own state. Mehjoor has completed his graduation in Bachelor of Arts from Gandhi Memorial College, Srinagar.
