= Manyala Pranith =

Indian cricketer (born 1993)

Personal information
- Born: 8 September 1993 (age 33); Visakhapatnam
- Batting: Left-handed
- Bowling: Right-arm offbreak

Domestic team information
- Years: Team
- 2017–18: Andhra
- Source: ESPNcricinfo, 11 February 2018

Manyala Pranith (born 8 September 1993) is an Indian cricketer. He made his List A debut for Andhra in the 2017–18 Vijay Hazare Trophy on 11 February 2018. He made his Twenty20 debut for Andhra in the 2018–19 Syed Mushtaq Ali Trophy on 28 February 2019.
