= Syed Sagar =

Indian cricketer (born 1990)

Personal information
- Full name: Syed Sagar Shah
- Born: 12 August 1990 (age 36); Srinagar, India
- Batting: Right-handed
- Bowling: Right-arm medium
- Role: Wicketkeeper batsman
- Source: Cricinfo, 3 February 2023

Syed Sagar (born 12 August 1990) is an Indian cricketer who generally plays for Jammu and Kashmir. He is a right-handed batsman. He holds the record for the highest T20 individual score when batting at number 9 or lower (74).
