= Nidhi Buley =

Indian cricketer (born 1986)

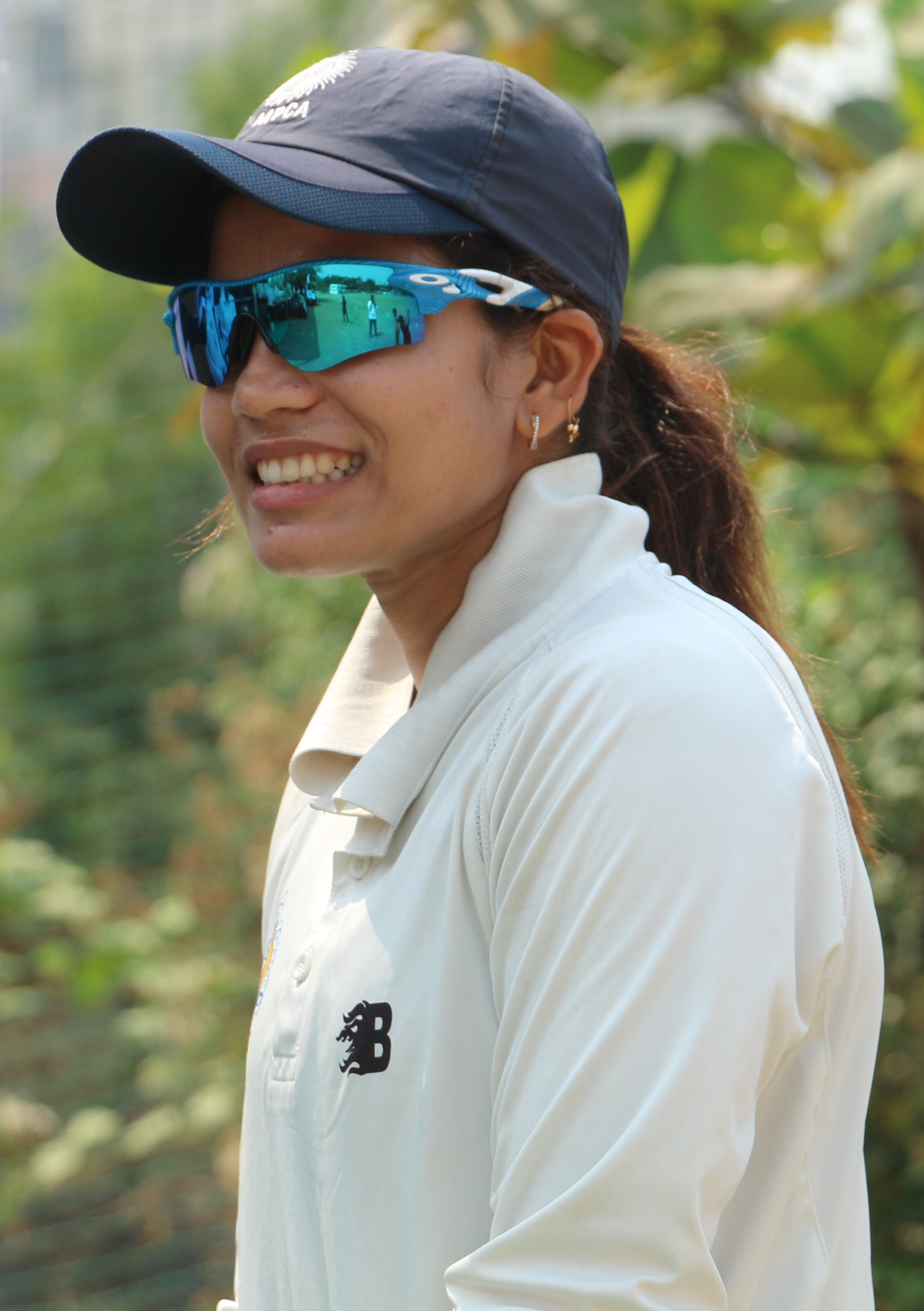

Personal information
- Full name: Nidhi Buley
- Born: 14 August 1986 (age 40); Indore, India
- Batting: Left-handed
- Bowling: Slow left-arm orthodox
- Role: Bowler

International information
- National side: India (2006)
- Only Test (cap 70): 8 August 2006 v England
- Only ODI (cap 82): 30 July 2006 v Ireland

Domestic team information
- Years: Team
- 2006/07–2018/19: Madhya Pradesh
- 2019/20–present: Jharkhand

Career statistics
Competition	WTest	WODI	WLA	WT20
Matches	1	1	79	67
Runs scored	0	–	534	442
Batting average	–	–	16.68	14.25
100s/50s	0/0	–	0/0	0/0
Top score	0*	–	45	35*
Balls bowled	72	42	3,677	1,351
Wickets	0	1	91	102
Bowling average	–	24.00	16.94	11.50
5 wickets in innings	0	0	0	2
10 wickets in match	0	0	0	0
Best bowling	–	1/24	4/12	5/8
Catches/stumpings	0/–	0/–	26/–	18/–
- Source: CricketArchive, 30 August 2022

Nidhi Buley (Hindi: निधि बुले; born 14 August 1986) is an Indian cricketer who currently plays for Jharkhand. She plays as a slow left-arm orthodox bowler. She has appeared in a single One Day International and one Test match for India in July and August 2006, respectively, on India's tour of England and Ireland. She previously played domestic cricket for Madhya Pradesh.
