= Kushang Patel =

Indian cricketer (born 1991)

Personal information
- Full name: Kushang Dineshbhai Patel
- Born: 13 September 1991 (age 35); Surat, Gujarat, India
- Source: ESPNcricinfo, 15 November 2016

Kushang Patel (born 13 September 1991) is an Indian first-class cricketer who plays for Saurashtra.

He made his debut in first-class for Gujarat in the 2012–13 Ranji Trophy on 17 November 2012. He made his List A debut for Saurashtra in the 2016–17 Vijay Hazare Trophy on 25 February 2017. He made his Twenty20 debut for Saurashtra in the 2017–18 Zonal T20 League on 8 January 2018.

He was the leading wicket-taker for Saurashtra in the 2018–19 Vijay Hazare Trophy, with seventeen dismissals in six matches.
