= Vishwajeet Singh =

Indian cricketer (born 1991)

Personal information
- Born: 8 November 1991 (age 35); Jammu, India
- Source: Cricinfo, 4 March 2017

Vishwajeet Singh (born 8 November 1991) is an Indian cricketer. He made his List A debut for Jammu & Kashmir in the 2016–17 Vijay Hazare Trophy on 4 March 2017.
