= Shubham Thakur =

Indian cricketer (born 1995)

Personal information
- Born: 1 October 1995 (age 31); Bilaspur district, Chhattisgarh, India
- Source: Cricinfo, 3 February 2017

Shubham Thakur (born 1 October 1995) is an Indian cricketer. He made his Twenty20 debut for Chhattisgarh in the 2016–17 Inter State Twenty-20 Tournament on 3 February 2017. He made his List A debut for Chhattisgarh in the 2016–17 Vijay Hazare Trophy on 1 March 2017.
