= Ganeshraj Narvekar =

Indian cricketer (born 1993)

Personal information
- Full name: Ganeshraj Dayanand Narvekar
- Born: 28 February 1993 (age 33); Mapusa, Goa, India
- Batting: Right handed
- Bowling: Legbreak googly

Domestic team information
- Years: Team
- 2016–17: Goa
- Source: ESPNcricinfo, 29 January 2017

Ganeshraj Narvekar (born 28 February 1993) is an Indian cricketer. He made his Twenty20 debut for Goa in the 2016–17 Inter State Twenty-20 Tournament on 29 January 2017.
