= Gaurav Kochar =

Indian cricketer (born 1992)

Personal information
- Born: 17 September 1992 (age 34); Delhi, India
- Source: ESPNcricinfo, 28 February 2017

Gaurav Kochar (born 17 September 1992) is an Indian cricketer. He made his List A debut for Services in the 2016–17 Vijay Hazare Trophy on 28 February 2017.
