= Ahmed Banday =

Indian cricketer

Personal information
- Full name: Ahmed Omer Farooq Banday
- Born: 9 March 1995 (age 31); Srinagar, India
- Batting: Right handed
- Bowling: Right arm Medium

Domestic team information
- Years: Team
- 2013–present: Jammu and Kashmir

Career statistics
Competition	FC	LA	T20
Matches	24	34	14
Runs scored	997	896	140
Batting average	24.31	27.15	10.00
100s/50s	2/4	0/8	0/0
Top score	136	94	26
Catches/stumpings	18/–	7/–	3/–
- Source: ESPNcricinfo, 9 April 2025

Ahmed Banday (born 9 March 1995) is an Indian cricketer who plays for Jammu and Kashmir. He made his List A debut for Jammu and Kashmir in the Vijay Hazare Trophy on 13 February 2013. He plays as an opening batsman for Jammu and Kashmir State team across all formats at national level. Currently he is playing for Bury Cricket Club Lancashire England in Greater Manchester Cricket League (GMCL) 2018 season.

On his debut against Delhi he scored a fifty and then another fifty against Haryana in the same tournament. His outstanding performance in the u19 tournaments earned him a call up for Zonal Cricket Academy at Mohali by BCCI and was subsequently selected in the senior team. In CK Nayudu Trophy 2016–2017, he scored 214 runs against Himachal Pradesh at Amtar in one innings. He became the first Kashmiri player to have ever hit a double ton in a national tournament. Hence ending the tournament with 435 runs in 7 innings at an average of 62.14 which included a double ton and two fifties. He was also J&K's leading run scorer.

He made his First-class cricket and Ranji Trophy debut on 29 December 2016 scoring a total of 414 runs in the season with one century and two fifties and was the leading run scorer for J&K. Currently he plays for JK state team for Ranji Trophy and has cemented his place as an opener with his consistent performance. In recently concluded Vijay Hazare 2018 trophy, Ahmed was J&K's top run scorer again with a total aggregate of 274 runs and an impressive average of 54.80, which includes three fifties. Additionally in 2018 under 23 BCCI one day league, Ahmed was once again J&K's top run scorer with an average of 49, which included three fifties from 6 matches.
