= Mohammad Muddassir =

Indian cricketer (born 1992)

Personal information
- Born: 29 November 1992 (age 33); Hyderabad, India
- Batting: Right-handed
- Bowling: Right-arm medium

Domestic team information
- Years: Team
- 2017–present: Hyderabad

Career statistics
Competition	FC	LA
Matches	3	1
Runs scored	16	1
Batting average	5.33	1.00
100s/50s	0/0	0/0
Top score	9*	1
Balls bowled	461	24
Wickets	9	1
Bowling average	30.44	20.00
5 wickets in innings	1	0
10 wickets in match	0	0
Best bowling	5/36	1/20
Catches/stumpings	1/–	0/–
- Source: ESPNcricinfo, 3 July 2019

Mohammad Muddassir (born 29 November 1992) is an Indian cricketer. He made his List A debut for Hyderabad in the 2016–17 Vijay Hazare Trophy on 6 March 2017. He made his first-class debut for Hyderabad in the 2017–18 Ranji Trophy on 17 November 2017, taking five wickets for 36 runs in the first innings.
