= Vipin Singh =

Indian cricketer (born 1993)

Personal information
- Born: 21 October 1993 (age 33); Varanasi, Uttar Pradesh
- Batting: Right-handed
- Bowling: Slow left arm orthodox

Domestic team information
- Years: Team
- 2016–17: Services
- Source: ESPNcricinfo, 25 February 2017

Vipin Singh (born 21 October 1993) is an Indian cricketer. He made his List A debut for Services in the 2016–17 Vijay Hazare Trophy on 25 February 2017.
