= Pavan Deshpande =

Indian cricketer (born 1989)

Personal information
- Full name: Pavan Uday Deshpande
- Born: 16 September 1989 (age 37); Dharwad, Karnataka, India
- Batting: Left-handed
- Bowling: Right-arm offbreak
- Role: Allrounder

Domestic team information
- Years: Team
- 2016–2020: Karnataka
- 2021–2022: Puducherry
- Source: ESPNcricinfo, 7 December 2016

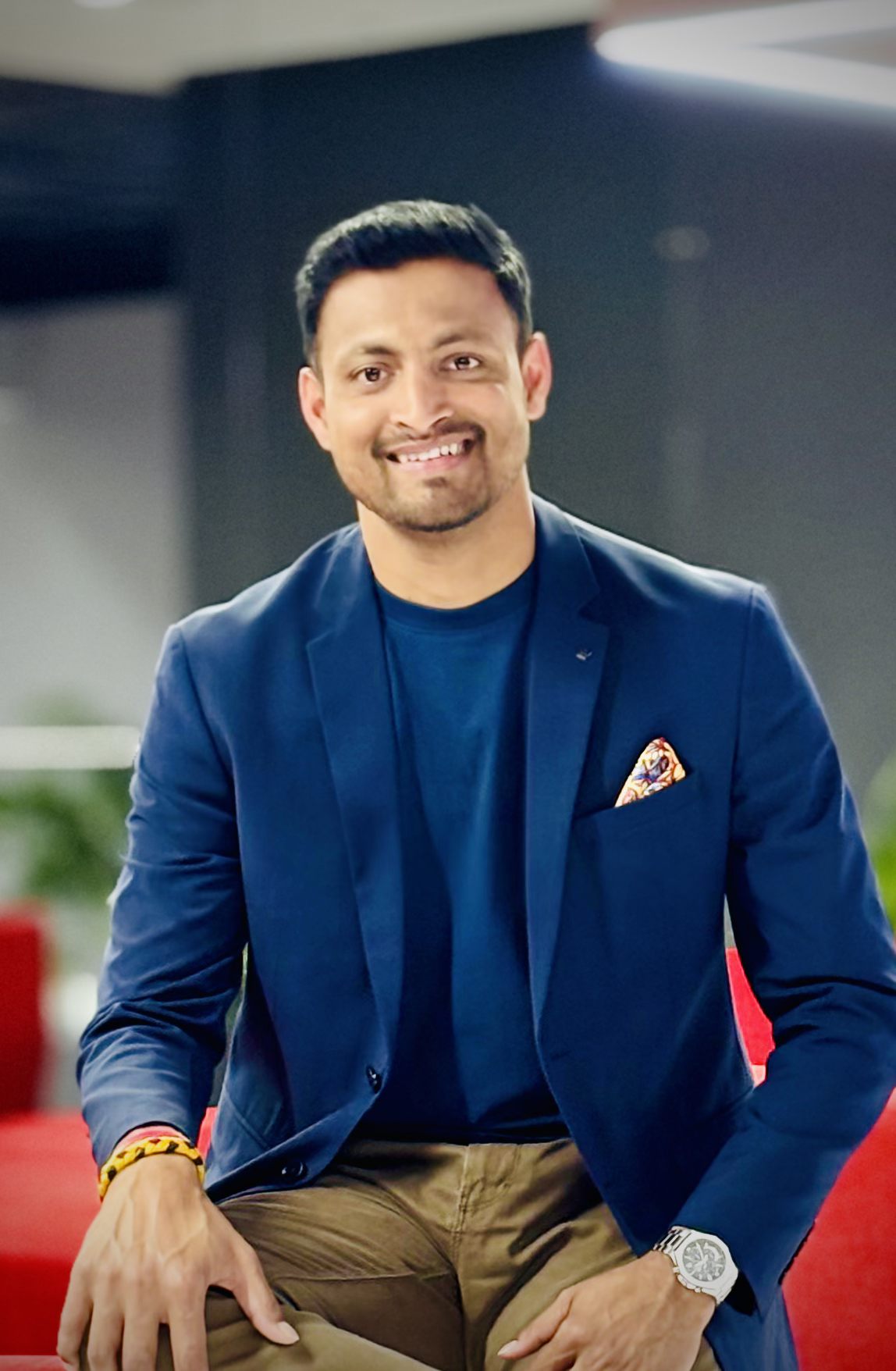
Pavan Deshpande, Indian First Class Cricketer and Commentator

Pavan Deshpande (born 16 September 1989) is an Indian first-class cricketer who played for Puducherry and Karnataka. He made his first-class debut for Karnataka in the 2016-17 Ranji Trophy on 7 December 2016. He made his List A debut for Karnataka in the 2016–17 Vijay Hazare Trophy on 25 February 2017. In January 2018, he was bought by the Royal Challengers Bangalore in the 2018 IPL auction. In the 2020 IPL auction, he was bought by the Royal Challengers Bangalore ahead of the 2020 Indian Premier League.
