= Shubham Agarwal =

Indian cricketer (born 1993)

Personal information
- Full name: Shubham Sanjay Agarwal
- Born: 21 November 1993 (age 32); Raigadh, Gujarat, India
- Batting: Right handed
- Bowling: Legbreak googly

Domestic team information
- Years: Team
- 2016/17–: Chhattisgarh
- 2017: Gujarat Lions
- Source: Cricinfo, 29 January 2017

Shubham Agarwal (born 21 November 1993) is an Indian cricketer. He made his Twenty20 debut for Chhattisgarh in the 2016–17 Inter State Twenty-20 Tournament on 29 January 2017. In February 2017, he was bought by the Gujarat Lions team for the 2017 Indian Premier League for 10 lakhs. He made his List A debut for Chhattisgarh in the 2016–17 Vijay Hazare Trophy on 25 February 2017. He made his first-class debut on 3 March 2022, for Chhattisgarh in the 2021–22 Ranji Trophy.
