= Aditya Tare =

Indian cricketer (born 1987)

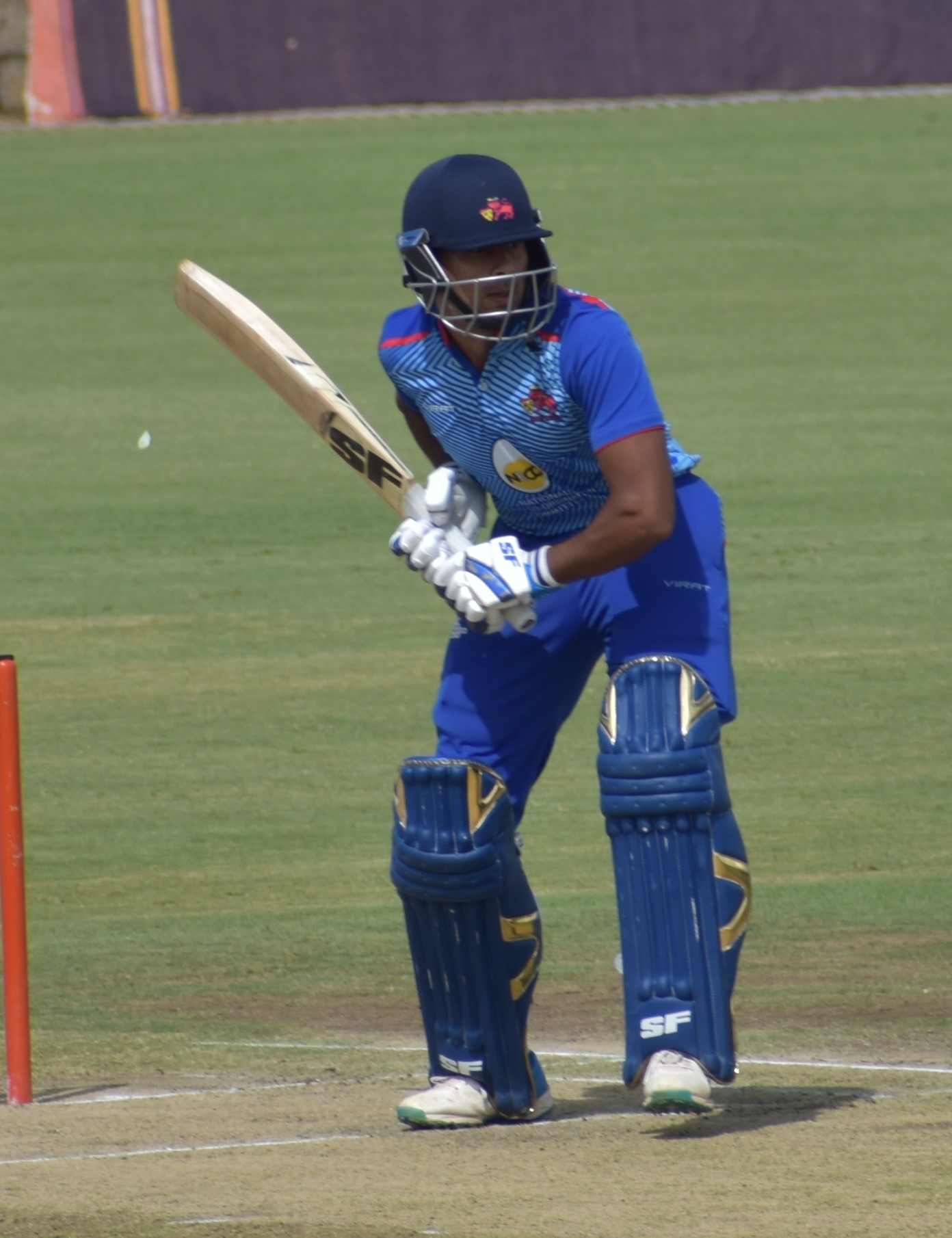
- Tare during the 2019–20 Vijay Hazare Trophy

Personal information
- Full name: Aditya Prakash Tare
- Born: 7 November 1987 (age 39); Bombay, Maharashtra, India
- Batting: Right-handed
- Role: Wicket-keeper batsman

Domestic team information
- Years: Team
- 2008–2022: Mumbai
- 2010–2015: Mumbai Indians (squad no. 27)
- 2016: Sunrisers Hyderabad (squad no. 27)
- 2017: Delhi Daredevils (squad no. 27)
- 2022–present: Uttarakhand

Career statistics
Competition	FC	LA	T20
Matches	101	92	130
Runs scored	5,608	2,619	2,630
Batting average	35.71	39.68	28.27
100s/50s	10/35	2/18	0/12
Top score	222	125 *	82
Catches/stumpings	312/29	117/19	71/20
- Source: ESPNcricinfo, 22 January 2025

Aditya Prakash Tare (born 7 November 1987) is an Indian cricketer. He is a wicketkeeper batsman who played for Mumbai Indians in the Indian Premier League and for Uttarakhand in domestic cricket.

Tare made his first-class debut in 2009, and IPL T20 debut on 19 Apr 2010 against Kolkata Knight Riders.

== Ranji ==
With 41 dismissals in the last season of Ranji Trophy he has made a record for most dismissals by a wicketkeeper. He was the second highest run getter for the team with 842 Runs, which includes double century and three half centuries. He has also been awarded as the Best Mumbai Ranji Cricketer for 2012–13.

== IPL ==
He has played for 5 matches, contributing a total of 123 runs including a half century against Rajasthan Royals. He has also been awarded 'Man of the Match' for his outstanding innings against Rajasthan Royals.

In February 2016, he was bought by the Sunrisers Hyderabad team for the 2016 Indian Premier League for 25 lakhs. In January 2018, he was bought by the Mumbai Indians in the 2018 IPL auction.
