= 2018–19 Ranji Trophy Group A =

Cricket tournament

2018-19 Ranji Trophy Group A
- The Ranji Trophy, awarded to the winners
- Dates: 1 November 2018 – 10 January 2019
- Administrator: BCCI
- Cricket format: First-class cricket
- Tournament format: Round-robin
- Host: India
- Participants: 9
- Matches: 36

The 2018–19 Ranji Trophy was the 85th season of the Ranji Trophy, the first-class cricket tournament that took place in India. It was contested by 37 teams, divided into four groups, with nine teams in Group A. The group stage ran from 1 November 2018 to 10 January 2019. The top five teams across Group A and Group B progressed to the quarter-finals of the competition.

In the opening round of fixtures, in the match between Mumbai and Railways in Delhi, players wore masks because of the poor air quality. In the third round match between Vidarbha and Baroda, Vidarbha's Wasim Jaffer became the first batsman to score 11,000 runs in the Ranji Trophy. The ninth round match between Vidarbha and Saurashtra was Jaffer's 146th Ranji match. He broke Devendra Bundela's record of playing in the most matches in the Ranji Trophy. In the fourth round match between Gujarat and Mumbai, Gujarat beat Mumbai by nine wickets, to become the first side to have four outright victories against them.

Ahead of the fifth round of fixtures, Saurashtra's captain Jaydev Shah announced that he would retire from all cricket following the team's match against Karnataka. He set the record for the most matches as captain in the Ranji Trophy.

Vidarbha became the first team to qualify from Group A, after Baroda beat Karnataka by two wickets in their final group-stage match. Despite the loss, Karnataka also qualified from Group A. Chhattisgarh and Maharashtra across Group A and B were relegated to Group C, On the final day of the group stage, Saurashtra and Gujarat also qualified from Group A for the quarter-finals.

== Points table ==
Pos	Team	Pld	W	L	D	T	NR	Pts	Quot
1	Vidarbha	8	3	0	5	0	0	29	1.332
2	Saurashtra	8	3	0	5	0	0	29	1.108
3	Karnataka	8	3	2	3	0	0	27	1.316
5	Gujarat	8	3	0	5	0	0	26	1.288
6	Baroda	8	3	1	4	0	0	26	1.057
11	Mumbai	8	1	2	5	0	0	17	0.924
15	Railways	8	1	4	3	0	0	14	0.868
17	Maharashtra	8	0	4	4	0	0	8	0.700
18	Chhattisgarh	8	0	4	4	0	0	6	0.635

- Top five teams across Groups A and B advanced to the knockout stage.
- Bottom two teams across Groups A and B relegated to the Elite Group C for the 2019-20 Ranji Trophy.

== Fixtures ==
=== Round 1 ===
1–4 November 2018
Scorecard

Maharashtra	v	Vidarbha
343 (105.5 overs); Chirag Khurana 89 (157); Aditya Sarwate 3/51 (15 overs)		120 (44.5 overs); Wasim Jaffer 27 (51); Satyajeet Bachhav 3/3 (5 overs)
		501/8 (175 overs) (f/o); Faiz Fazal 131 (324); Satyajeet Bachhav 3/109 (48 overs)

Match drawn
Maharashtra Cricket Association Stadium, Pune
Umpires: Akshay Totre and Sanjay Hazare
Player of the match: Faiz Fazal (Vidarbha)

- Vidarbha won the toss and elected to field.
- Darshan Nalkande (Vidarbha) made his first-class debut.

1–4 November 2018
Scorecard

Baroda	v	Gujarat
290 (81.2 overs); Yusuf Pathan 63 (135); Siddharth Desai 5/109 (27 overs)		302 (102.1 overs); Rujul Bhatt 76 (137); Lukman Meriwala 3/50 (15.1 overs)
179 (72.2 overs); Pinal Shah 71 (112); Roosh Kalaria 6/35 (18.2 overs)		168/1 (48.2 overs); Priyank Kirit Panchal 112* (132)

Gujarat won by 9 wickets
Moti Bagh Stadium, Vadodara
Umpires: Rohan Pandit and Sudhir Asnani
Player of the match: Roosh Kalaria (Gujarat)

- Gujarat won the toss and elected to field.
- Arzan Nagwaswalla (Gujarat) made his first-class debut.

1–4 November 2018
Scorecard

Mumbai	v	Railways
411 (115.2 overs); Shivam Dube 114* (139); Harsh Tyagi 4/83 (24.2 overs)		307 (104.2 overs); Arindam Ghosh 71 (197); Tushar Deshpande 6/70 (24.2 overs)
321/5 (102.4 overs); Aditya Tare 100* (187); Harsh Tyagi 3/86 (36 overs)

Match drawn
Karnail Singh Stadium, Delhi
Umpires: Nitin Pandit and Krishnamachari Srinivasan
Player of the match: Tushar Deshpande (Mumbai)

- Mumbai won the toss and elected to bat.
- Abhinav Dixit, Harsh Tyagi (Railways), Ashay Sardesai and Shams Mulani (Mumbai) all made their first-class debuts.
- Shivam Dube (Mumbai) scored his maiden century in first-class cricket.
- Siddhesh Lad (Mumbai) scored his 3,000th run in first-class cricket.

1–4 November 2018
Scorecard

Saurashtra	v	Chhattisgarh
475 (142.2 overs); Sheldon Jackson 147 (202); Shahnawaz Hussain 4/97 (19.2 overs)		355 (125.2 overs); Sumit Ruikar 67 (102); Jaydev Unadkat 7/86 (33 overs)
178/5 (58.1 overs); Sheldon Jackson 52* (71); Sahil Gupta 4/69 (19 overs)

Match drawn
Saurashtra Cricket Association Stadium, Rajkot
Umpires: Amiesh Saheba and Rajesh Timaney
Player of the match: Jaydev Unadkat (Saurashtra)

- Chhattisgarh won the toss and elected to field.
- Harvik Desai (Saurashtra), Sanjeet Desai and Omkar Verma (Chhattisgarh) all made their first-class debuts.
- Sheldon Jackson (Saurashtra) scored his fifteenth century in first-class cricket.

=== Round 2 ===
12–15 November 2018
Scorecard

Baroda	v	Maharashtra
322 (83.4 overs); Yusuf Pathan 99 (95); Satyajeet Bachhav 4/81 (21 overs)		268 (89.2 overs); Naushad Shaikh 65 (126); Swapnil Singh 5/78 (23.2 overs)
410/5d (82.4 overs); Vishnu Solanki 175 (203); Ashay Palkar 2/67 (16 overs)		217/2 (67 overs); Ruturaj Gaikwad 118* (217); Swapnil Singh 2/59 (20 overs)

Match drawn
Moti Bagh Stadium, Vadodara
Umpires: Rohan Pandit and Sudhir Asnani
Player of the match: Swapnil Singh (Baroda)

- Maharashtra won the toss and elected to field.
- Ashay Palkar (Maharashtra) made his first-class debut.

12–15 November 2018
Scorecard

Vidarbha	v	Karnataka
307 (102.2 overs); Shrikant Wagh 57 (83); Jagadeesha Suchith 4/33 (14.2 overs)		378 (134 overs); Dega Nischal 113 (338); Aditya Sarwate 5/91 (49 overs)
228 (84.4 overs); Ganesh Satish 79 (164); Jagadeesha Suchith 5/70 (32 overs)		76/6 (33 overs); Ravikumar Samarth 30 (80); Aditya Sarwate 4/24 (14 overs)

Match drawn
Vidarbha Cricket Association Ground, Nagpur
Umpires: K. N. Ananthapadmanabhan and Rajeev Godara

- Vidarbha won the toss and elected to bat.
- BR Sharath and Krishnamurthy Siddharth (Karnataka) both made their first-class debuts.
- Vinay Kumar (Karnataka) played his 100th match in the Ranji Trophy.

12–15 November 2018
Scorecard

Gujarat	v	Chhattisgarh
538/7d (146 overs); Dhruv Raval 116* (204); Vishal Kushwah 3/92 (24 overs)		422 (127.3 overs); Vishal Kushwah 159 (197); Arzan Nagwaswalla 4/66 (21 overs)
167/5 (52.4 overs); Manprit Juneja 50* (98); Pankaj Kumar Rao 2/31 (15 overs)

Match drawn
Sardar Vallabhai Patel Stadium, Valsad
Umpires: Sanjay Hazare and Krishnamachari Srinivasan
Player of the match: Vishal Kushwah (Chhattisgarh)

- Gujarat won the toss and elected to bat.

12–15 November 2018
Scorecard

Railways	v	Saurashtra
200 (64 overs); Mahesh Rawat 46 (56); Ravindra Jadeja 4/58 (20 overs)		348 (118.3 overs); Ravindra Jadeja 178* (332); Harsh Tyagi 3/78 (25.3 overs)
331 (119.4 overs); Harsh Tyagi 93 (240); Dharmendrasinh Jadeja 5/95 (34 overs)		186/7 (49 overs); Sheldon Jackson 54 (55); Avinash Yadav 5/88 (23 overs)

Saurashtra won by 3 wickets
Saurashtra Cricket Association Stadium, Rajkot
Umpires: Amiesh Saheba and Somnath Jha
Player of the match: Ravindra Jadeja (Saurashtra)

- Railways won the toss and elected to bat.

=== Round 3 ===
20–23 November 2018
Scorecard

Vidarbha	v	Baroda
529/6d (164 overs); Wasim Jaffer 153 (284); Lukman Meriwala 2/79 (24 overs)		337 (121.5 overs); Aditya Waghmode 103 (253); Lalit Yadav 3/42 (21.5 overs)
		216/0 (59.4 overs) (f/o); Aditya Waghmode 102* (180)

Match drawn
Vidarbha Cricket Association Ground, Nagpur
Umpires: Amiesh Saheba and Nikhil Patwardhan
Player of the match: Aditya Waghmode (Baroda)

- Vidarbha won the toss and elected to bat.
- Wasim Jaffer (Vidarbha) scored his 11,000th run in the Ranji Trophy.

20–23 November 2018
Scorecard

Karnataka	v	Mumbai
400 (129.4 overs); Krishnamurthy Siddharth 161 (299); Shivam Dube 7/53 (28.4 overs)		205 (85.5 overs); Jay Bista 70 (118); Ronit More 5/52 (21.5 overs)
170/5d (51 overs); Krishnamurthy Siddharth 71* (125); Dhawal Kulkarni 2/18 (9 overs)		173/4 (64 overs); Akhil Herwadkar 53 (74); Abhimanyu Mithun 2/22 (8 overs)

Match drawn
KSCA Stadium, Belagavi
Umpires: Ulhas Gandhe and K. N. Ananthapadmanabhan
Player of the match: Krishnamurthy Siddharth (Karnataka)

- Karnataka won the toss and elected to bat.

20–23 November 2018
Scorecard

Gujarat	v	Saurashtra
324 (103.5 overs); Roosh Kalaria 91* (149); Chetan Sakariya 5/83 (22 overs)		349 (108 overs); Harvik Desai 82 (223); Siddharth Desai 3/93 (26 overs)
329/4d (71 overs); Priyank Kirit Panchal 141 (149); Prerak Mankad 2/84 (21 overs)		94/5 (60 overs); Harvik Desai 50 (110); Rujul Bhatt 2/12 (10 overs)

Match drawn
GS Patel Stadium, Nadiad
Umpires: Sanjay Hazare and Rohan Pandit
Player of the match: Jaydev Shah (Saurashtra)

- Gujarat won the toss and elected to bat.
- Chetan Sakariya (Saurashtra) made his first-class debut.
- Chetan Sakariya (Saurashtra) took his maiden five-wicket haul in first-class cricket.

20–23 November 2018
Scorecard

Chhattisgarh	v	Railways
300 (108 overs); Harpreet Singh 79 (121); Manjeet Singh 4/85 (19 overs)		330 (121.5 overs); Mahesh Rawat 110 (187); Pankaj Rao 5/72 (35 overs)
219/5d (58.1 overs); Sanjeet Desai 67 (122); Karan Thakur 3/44 (15 overs)		70/1 (20 overs); Nitin Bhille 53* (71); Sumit Ruikar 1/24 (10 overs)

Match drawn
Shaheed Veer Narayan Singh International Cricket Stadium, Raipur
Umpires: Sudhir Asnani and Krishnamachari Srinivasan
Player of the match: Mahesh Rawat (Railways)

- Railways won the toss and elected to field.

=== Round 4 ===
28 November–1 December 2018
Scorecard

Chhattisgarh	v	Vidarbha
232 (109 overs); Manoj Singh 77* (237); Aditya Thakare 5/56 (26 overs)		332/6d (116 overs); Faiz Fazal 146 (302); Sumit Ruikar 3/46 (27 overs)
143 (57 overs); Sumit Ruikar 39* (36); Lalit Yadav 7/56 (22 overs)		46/0 (19.2 overs); Akshay Wadkar 25* (60)

Vidarbha won by 10 wickets
Shaheed Veer Narayan Singh International Stadium, Raipur
Umpires: Sudhir Asnani and Krishnamachari Srinivasan
Player of the match: Lalit Yadav (Vidarbha)

- Chhattisgarh won the toss and elected to bat.
- Mohit Kale and Yash Thakur (Vidarbha) both made their first-class debuts.

28 November–1 December 2018
Scorecard

Maharashtra	v	Karnataka
113 (39.4 overs); Ruturaj Gaikwad 39 (97); Jagadeesha Suchith 4/26 (8 overs)		186 (84.2 overs); Shreyas Gopal 40 (100); Satyajeet Bachhav 3/43 (16.2 overs)
256 (97 overs); Ruturaj Gaikwad 89 (161); Shreyas Gopal 4/64 (21 overs)		184/3 (70.2 overs); Devdutt Padikkal 77 (128); Satyajeet Bachhav 2/56 (24 overs)

Karnataka won by 7 wickets
Srikantadatta Narasimha Raja Wadeyar Ground, Mysore
Umpires: Nitin Pandit and Steve O'Shaughnessy
Player of the match: Shreyas Gopal (Karnataka)

- Maharashtra won the toss and elected to bat.
- Devdutt Padikkal (Karnataka) and Jay Pande (Maharashtra) both made their first-class debuts.

28 November–1 December 2018
Scorecard

Mumbai	v	Gujarat
297 (80.3 overs); Shivam Dube 110 (128); Arzan Nagwaswalla 5/78 (23.3 overs)		281 (98.5 overs); Dhruv Raval 99 (186); Dhawal Kulkarni 3/71 (24 overs)
187 (75.4 overs); Aditya Tare 59 (114); Chintan Gaja 4/57 (25 overs)		206/1 (41.5 overs); Priyank Panchal 112* (109); Shivam Dube 1/31 (7 overs)

Gujarat won by 9 wickets
Wankhede Stadium, Mumbai
Umpires: Ulhas Gandhe and C. K. Nandan
Player of the match: Shivam Dube (Gujarat)

- Gujarat won the toss and elected to field.
- Dhrumil Matkar (Mumbai) made his first-class debut.

28 November–1 December 2018
Scorecard

Saurashtra	v	Baroda
521 (168.2 overs); Jaydev Shah 165 (274); Atit Sheth 3/74 (23.2 overs)		533/9 (167.2 overs); Kedar Devdhar 224 (336); Hardik Rathod 3/98 (27 overs)

Match drawn
Saurashtra Cricket Association Stadium, Rajkot
Umpires: Amiesh Saheba and Vineet Kulkarni
Player of the match: Kedar Devdhar (Baroda)

- Saurashtra won the toss and elected to bat.
- Yuvraj Chudasama (Saurashtra) made his first-class debut.

=== Round 5 ===
6–9 December 2018
Scorecard

Maharashtra	v	Mumbai
352 (109.4 overs); Swapnil Gugale 101 (191); Akash Parkar 4/56 (20 overs)		273 (80.5 overs); Siddhesh Lad 93 (180); Ashay Palkar 4/62 (20.5 overs)
254 (90.1 overs); Rahul Tripathi 76 (129); Shivam Dube 3/25 (13.1 overs)		135/5 (47 overs); Aditya Tare 52* (125); Ashay Palkar 2/23 (6 overs)

Match drawn
Maharashtra Cricket Association Stadium, Pune
Umpires: Krishnamachari Srinivasan and Shawn Craig
Player of the match: Swapnil Gugale (Maharashtra)

- Mumbai won the toss and elected to field.

6–9 December 2018
Scorecard

Chhattisgarh	v	Baroda
129 (39.4 overs); Harpreet Singh 37 (57); Swapnil Singh 5/23 (7.4 overs)		385 (84.4 overs); Yusuf Pathan 129* (166); Omkar Verma 4/84 (17.4 overs)
283 (81.3 overs); Avnish Dhaliwal 79 (121); Lukman Meriwala 3/18 (12 overs)		31/1 (3.3 overs); Kedar Devdhar 25* (13); Omkar Verma 1/21 (2 overs)

Baroda won by 9 wickets
Moti Bagh Stadium, Vadodara
Umpires: Abhijit Deshmukh and Rohan Pandit
Player of the match: Yusuf Pathan (Baroda)

- Chhattisgarh won the toss and elected to bat.
- Shivalik Sharma (Baroda) and Vikrant Rajput (Chhattisgarh) both made their first-class debuts.

6–9 December 2018
Scorecard

Saurashtra	v	Karnataka
316 (97.1 overs); Jaydev Shah 97 (159); Jagadeesha Suchith 6/111 (30.1 overs)		217 (78.1 overs); Karun Nair 63 (83); Dharmendrasinh Jadeja 7/103 (34 overs)
79 (27.4 overs); Snell Patel 22 (30); Pavan Deshpande 3/5 (5.4 overs)		91 (36.5 overs); Karun Nair 30 (55); Kamlesh Makvana 5/28 (14.5 overs)

Saurashtra won by 87 runs
Saurashtra Cricket Association Stadium, Rajkot
Umpires: Yeshwant Barde and Brad White
Player of the match: Dharmendrasinh Jadeja (Saurashtra)

- Saurashtra won the toss and elected to bat.

6–9 December 2018
Scorecard

Gujarat	v	Railways
367 (93.5 overs); Piyush Chawla 130 (157); Amit Mishra 4/93 (21 overs)		547/9d (166 overs); Mahesh Rawat 119* (154); Hardik Patel 3/134 (39 overs)
191/7 (92 overs); Priyank Panchal 58 (119); Harsh Tyagi 4/46 (32 overs)

Match drawn
Sardar Vallabhbhai Patel Stadium, Valsad
Umpires: Nitin Pandit and Saiyed Khalid
Player of the match: Nitin Bhille (Railways)

- Railways won the toss and elected to field.

=== Round 6 ===
14–17 December 2018
Scorecard

Saurashtra	v	Maharashtra
398 (136.3 overs); Vishvaraj Jadeja 97 (154); Anupam Sanklecha 6/103 (34.3 overs)		247 (70.2 overs); Kedar Jadhav 99 (155); Chetan Sakariya 6/63 (17.2 overs)
120/5 (34.1 overs); Harvik Desai 44 (89); Chirag Khurana 2/35 (8.1 overs)		267 (75.2 overs) (f/o); Rohit Motwani 120* (190); Dharmendrasinh Jadeja 7/55 (17.2 overs)

Saurashtra won by 5 wickets
Golf Club Ground, Nasik
Umpires: Abhijit Bengeri and Jayaraman Madanagopal
Player of the match: Dharmendrasinh Jadeja (Saurashtra)

- Maharashtra won the toss and elected to field.
- Vishvaraj Jadeja (Saurashtra) made his first-class debut.

14–17 December 2018
Scorecard

Vidarbha	v	Railways
331 (110.3 overs); Akshay Karnewar 94 (136); Avinash Yadav 5/78 (35.3 overs)		236 (88.5 overs); Pratham Singh 95 (232); Akshay Wakhare 5/71 (25.5 overs)
147 (50.5 overs); Aditya Sarwate 39 (54); Harsh Tyagi 7/41 (22.5 overs)		124 (32.2 overs); Manjeet Singh 33 (17); Aditya Sarwate 6/43 (16.2 overs)

Vidarbha won by 118 runs
Karnail Singh Stadium, Delhi
Umpires: Amit Bansal and Brad White
Player of the match: Aditya Sarwate (Vidarbha)

- Vidarbha won the toss and elected to bat.

14–17 December 2018
Scorecard

Gujarat	v	Karnataka
216 (69.4 overs); Priyank Panchal 74 (135); Shreyas Gopal 2/21 (9 overs)		389 (121 overs); Shreyas Gopal 93 (115); Piyush Chawla 4/99 (30 overs)
345 (124.5 overs); Manprit Juneja 98 (212); Ronit More 4/61 (21.5 overs)		107/4 (27 overs); Mayank Agarwal 53 (57); Axar Patel 3/45 (13 overs)

Match drawn
Lalabhai Contractor Stadium, Surat
Umpires: Krishnaraj Srinath and Tapan Sharma
Player of the match: Shreyas Gopal (Karnataka)

- Gujarat won the toss and elected to bat.
- Srinivas Sharath and Prateek Jain (Karnataka) both made their first-class debuts.

14–17 December 2018
Scorecard

Mumbai	v	Baroda
465 (92.5 overs); Shreyas Iyer 178 (139); Hardik Pandya 5/81 (18.5 overs)		436 (146 overs); Vishnu Solanki 133 (254); Royston Dias 4/99 (31 overs)
307/7d (84 overs); Shivam Dube 76 (60); Hardik Pandya 2/21 (10 overs)

Match drawn
Wankhede Stadium, Mumbai
Umpires: Chettithody Shamshuddin and Subrat Das
Player of the match: Shreyas Iyer (Mumbai)

- Baroda won the toss and elected to field.
- Vikrant Auti and Eknath Kerkar (Mumbai) both made their first-class debuts.

=== Round 7 ===
22–25 December 2018
Scorecard

Gujarat	v	Vidarbha
321 (108.5 overs); Kathan Patel 105 (205); Aditya Sarwate 4/71 (28.5 overs)		485 (145.5 overs); Wasim Jaffer 126 (176); Siddharth Desai 8/148 (43.5 overs)
214/6 (93 overs); Rujul Bhatt 64* (217); Akshay Karnewar 5/73 (43 overs)

Match drawn
Vidarbha Cricket Association Ground, Nagpur
Umpires: Saiyed Khalid and Rohan Pandit
Player of the match: Wasim Jaffer (Vidarbha)

- Gujarat won the toss and elected to bat.
- Atharva Taide (Vidarbha) made his first-class debut.
- Wasim Jaffer (Vidarbha) scored his 55th century in first-class cricket.

22–25 December 2018
Scorecard

Karnataka	v	Railways
214 (91.4 overs); Krishnamurthy Siddharth 69 (185); Avinash Yadav 3/43 (21 overs)		143 (60.2 overs); Manish Rao 52* (132); Ronit More 5/45 (17.2 overs)
290/2d (84 overs); Dega Nischal 101 (232); Harsh Tyagi 2/78 (20 overs)		185 (86 overs); Pratham Singh 48 (151); Krishnappa Gowtham 6/30 (24 overs)

Karnataka won by 176 runs
KSCA Navule Stadium, Shimoga
Umpires: Amiesh Saheba and Vineet Kulkarni
Player of the match: Dega Nischal (Karnataka)

- Railways won the toss and elected to field.
- Sahim Hasan (Railways) made his first-class debut.

22–25 December 2018
Scorecard

Mumbai	v	Saurashtra
394 (107 overs); Jay Bista 127 (150); Jaydev Unadkat 4/71 (24 overs)		348 (119.3 overs); Sheldon Jackson 95 (144); Shivam Dube 2/34 (20 overs)
238/8d (48 overs); Shreyas Iyer 83 (61); Chetan Sakariya 3/47 (12 overs)		266/7 (71.4 overs); Vishvaraj Jadeja 71 (129); Minad Manjrekar 4/39 (11 overs)

Match drawn
Wankhede Stadium, Mumbai
Umpires: Nikhil Patwardhan
Player of the match: Jay Bista (Mumbai)

- Saurashtra won the toss and elected to field.
- Tanush Kotian (Mumbai) made his first-class debut.

22–25 December 2018
Scorecard

Maharashtra	v	Chhattisgarh
239 (68.3 overs); Rahul Tripathi 102 (145); Vishal Kushwah 4/59 (12.3 overs)		462 (140.5 overs); Ajay Mandal 135 (217); Anupam Sanklecha 5/89 (28 overs)
397/9d (99.5 overs); Kedar Jadhav 103 (115); Omkar Verma 4/110 (24 overs)		91/6 (33.1 overs); Avnish Dhaliwal 41 (61); Swapnil Gugale 3/9 (7 overs)

Match drawn
Shaheed Veer Narayan Singh International Cricket Stadium, Raipur
Umpires: Anil Chaudhary and C. K. Nandan
Player of the match: Ajay Mandal (Chhattisgarh)

- Maharashtra won the toss and elected to bat.
- Anuj Tiwary (Chhattisgarh) and Mandar Bhandari (Maharashtra) both made their first-class debuts.

=== Round 8 ===
30 December 2018 – 2 January 2019
Scorecard

Karnataka	v	Chhattisgarh
418 (131.4 overs); Dega Nischal 107 (242); Pankaj Rao 7/82 (29 overs)		283 (89 overs); Harpreet Singh 120 (239); Ronit More 5/48 (18 overs)
219/7d (49.3 overs); Manish Pandey 102* (102); Pankaj Rao 4/67 (16 overs)		156 (57 overs); Avnish Dhaliwal 61 (142); Ronit More 4/35 (13 overs)

Karnataka won by 198 runs
KSCA Cricket Ground, Alur
Umpires: Anil Chaudhary and Nitin Menon
Player of the match: Ronit More (Karnataka)

- Chhattisgarh won the toss and elected to field.
- Liyan Khan (Karnataka) made his first-class debut.

30 December 2018 – 2 January 2019
Scorecard

Maharashtra	v	Gujarat
230 (67.1 overs); Ruturaj Gaikwad 70 (128); Chintan Gaja 5/57 (18 overs)		545/8d (130 overs); Priyank Panchal 141 (209); Anupam Sanklecha 3/80 (20 overs)
185 (55.5 overs); Anupam Sanklecha 40* (32); Piyush Chawla 3/18 (8.5 overs)

Gujarat won by an innings and 130 runs
Maharashtra Cricket Association Stadium, Pune
Umpires: Sanjay Hazare and C. K. Nandan
Player of the match: Chintan Gaja (Gujarat)

- Gujarat won the toss and elected to field.

30 December 2018 – 2 January 2019
Scorecard

Baroda	v	Railways
313 (94 overs); Krunal Pandya 160 (219); Amit Mishra 5/76 (25 overs)		200 (68.3 overs); Mahesh Rawat 50 (68); Krunal Pandya 4/50 (18.3 overs)
157 (55 overs); Krunal Pandya 104 (143); Amit Mishra 7/50 (21 overs)		106 (39.4 overs); Marripuri Suresh 29* (63); Bhargav Bhatt 5/43 (15.4 overs)

Baroda won by 164 runs
South Eastern Railway Stadium, Visakhapatnam
Umpires: Amiesh Saheba and K. N. Ananthapadmanabhan
Player of the match: Krunal Pandya (Baroda)

- Railways won the toss and elected to field.
- Gandhar Bhatawadekar (Railways) made his first-class debut.

30 December 2018 – 2 January 2019
Scorecard

Vidarbha	v	Mumbai
511 (129.4 overs); Wasim Jaffer 178 (196); Dhrumil Matkar 5/141 (34.4 overs)		252 (78.5 overs); Jay Bista 64 (111); Akshay Wakhare 5/85 (29 overs)
		114 (34.4 overs) (f/o); Dhrumil Matkar 36 (58); Aditya Sarwate 6/48 (14.4 overs)

Vidarbha won by an innings and 145 runs
Vidarbha Cricket Association Ground, Nagpur
Umpires: Sadashiv Iyer and Virender Sharma
Player of the match: Wasim Jaffer (Vidarbha)

- Vidarbha won the toss and elected to bat.
- Wasim Jaffer (Vidarbha) played in his 145th match in the Ranji Trophy, equalling the record set by Devendra Bundela.
- Dhrumil Matkar (Mumbai) took his maiden five-wicket haul in first-class cricket.

=== Round 9 ===
7–10 January 2019
Scorecard

Chhattisgarh	v	Mumbai
129 (42.1 overs); Amandeep Khare 48 (48); Tushar Deshpande 5/46 (12 overs)		188 (62 overs); Vikrant Auti 43 (78); Pankaj Rao 3/53 (19 overs)
149 (32.5 overs); Vishal Kushwah 47 (22); Shardul Thakur 4/47 (8 overs)		92/1 (24.2 overs); Jay Bista 49* (69); Pankaj Rao 1/20 (7.2 overs)

Mumbai won by 9 wickets
Wankhede Stadium, Mumbai
Umpires: Nitin Menon and Yeshwant Barde
Player of the match: Tushar Deshpande (Mumbai)

- Mumbai won the toss and elected to field.
- Yashasvi Jaiswal (Mumbai) and Lavin Coster (Chhattisgarh) both made their first-class debuts.

7–10 January 2019
Scorecard

Maharashtra	v	Railways
70 (23.2 overs); Satyajeet Bachhav 12 (20); Avinash Yadav 4/38 (12 overs)		259 (77.4 overs); Mahesh Rawat 89 (117); Satyajeet Bachhav 8/108 (36.4 overs)
131 (39.1 overs); Satyajeet Bachhav 27 (55); Avinash Yadav 5/71 (20 overs)

Railways won by an innings and 58 runs
South Eastern Railway Stadium, Visakhapatnam
Umpires: Amiesh Saheba and Sanjay Hazare
Player of the match: Mahesh Rawat (Railways)

- Maharashtra won the toss and elected to bat.
- Nikhil Naik and Siddhesh Warghante (Maharashtra) both made their first-class debuts.

7–10 January 2019
Scorecard

Saurashtra	v	Vidarbha
356 (136.4 overs); Harvik Desai 74 (165); Yash Thakur 4/92 (32.4 overs)		280/9d (118 overs); Wasim Jaffer 98 (225); Jaydev Unadkat 6/56 (27 overs)
218/2d (73 overs); Vishvaraj Jadeja 105* (188); Suniket Bingewar 1/24 (15 overs)

Match drawn
Saurashtra Cricket Association Stadium, Rajkot
Umpires: Anil Dandekar and Sudhir Asnani
Player of the match: Jaydev Unadkat (Saurashtra)

- Saurashtra won the toss and elected to bat.
- Suniket Bingewar (Vidarbha) made his first-class debut.

7–10 January 2019
Scorecard

Karnataka	v	Baroda
112 (31.2 overs); Manish Pandey 43 (70); Lukman Meriwala 3/22 (6 overs)		223 (51 overs); Vishnu Solanki 69 (85); Shreyas Gopal 4/47 (11 overs)
220 (63.4 overs); Manish Pandey 50 (75); Deepak Hooda 5/31 (14.4 overs)		110/8 (28.1 overs); Yusuf Pathan 41 (30); Prasidh Krishna 3/14 (12 overs)

Baroda won by 2 wickets
Moti Bagh Stadium, Vadodara
Umpires: Chettithody Shamshuddin and Anil Chaudhary
Player of the match: Bhargav Bhatt (Baroda)

- Karnataka won the toss and elected to bat.
- Shubhang Hegde (Karnataka) made his first-class debut.
