= 2018–19 Vijay Hazare Trophy Group A =

Cricket tournament

- Dates: 19 September – 8 October 2018
- Administrator(s): BCCI
- Cricket format: List A cricket
- Tournament format(s): Round-robin and Playoff format
- Participants: 9

The 2018–19 Vijay Hazare Trophy was the 17th season of the Vijay Hazare Trophy, a List A cricket tournament in India. It was contested by the 37 domestic cricket teams of India, with nine teams in Group A. The group stage started on 19 September 2018, with the top five teams across Group A and Group B progressing to the quarter-finals of the competition. Mumbai and Maharashtra both progressed from Group A to the knock-out phase of the tournament.

== Points table ==
Pos	Team	Pld	W	L	T	NR	Pts	NRR
1	Mumbai	8	6	0	0	2	28	1.634
3	Maharashtra	8	6	1	0	1	26	1.003
6	Baroda	8	4	2	0	2	20	1.141
7	Punjab	8	4	2	0	2	20	0.354
10	Himachal Pradesh	8	3	4	0	1	14	−0.138
11	Vidarbha	8	3	4	0	1	14	−0.819
12	Karnataka	8	2	4	0	2	12	−0.175
16	Goa	8	1	5	0	2	8	−0.935
18	Railways	8	0	7	0	1	2	−1.719

- Top five teams across Groups A and B advanced to the knockout stage.
- Bottom two teams across Groups A and B relegated to the Elite Group C for the next season.

== Fixtures ==
=== Round 1 ===
19 September 2018
9:00
Scorecard

Goa; 266/7 (50 overs)	v	Maharashtra; 267/5 (47.5 overs)
Amogh Sunil Desai 65 (93); Samad Fallah 2/42 (10 overs)		Jay Pande 117* (136); Amogh Sunil Desai 2/39 (6.4 overs)

Maharashtra won by 5 wickets
KSCA Cricket Ground, Alur
Umpires: Abhijeet Bengeri (Ind) and GS Ananth Ramakrishnan (Ind)

- Maharashtra won the toss and elected to field.
- Atharva Kale, Jay Pande, Mandar Bhandari, (Maharashtra) and Deepraj Gaonkar (Goa) made their List A debuts.
- Jay Pande (Maharashtra) scored his first century in List A cricket.

19 September 2018
9:00
Scorecard

Baroda; 238 (49.5 overs)	v	Mumbai; 239/1 (41.3 overs)
Krunal Pandya 85 (111); Dhawal Kulkarni 4/39 (8.5 overs)		Prithvi Shaw 98 (66); Krunal Pandya 1/34 (6 overs)

Mumbai won by 9 wickets
KSCA Cricket Ground, Alur
Umpires: P Jayapal (Ind) and Yeshwant Barde (Ind)

- Baroda won the toss and elected to bat.
- Tushar Deshpande and Vijay Gohil (Mumbai) both made their List A debuts.

19 September 2018
9:00
Scorecard

Punjab; 290/7 (50 overs)	v	Himachal Pradesh; 255 (48.3 overs)
Shubman Gill 115 (131); Rishi Dhawan 3/50 (10 overs)		Prashant Chopra 95 (122); Siddarth Kaul 4/55 (10 overs)

Punjab won by 35 runs
KSCA Cricket Ground, Alur
Umpires: Ulhas Gandhe and Belur Ravi

- Arshdeep Singh (Punjab) made his List A debut.

=== Round 2 ===
20 September 2018
9:00
Scorecard

Vidarbha; 254 (50 overs)	v	Baroda; 151/2 (29 overs)
Atharva Taide 57 (65); Lukman Meriwala 3/54 (10 overs)		Aditya Waghmode 50 (71); Akshay Karnewar 1/27 (4 overs)

Baroda won by 37 runs (VJD method)
Just Cricket Academy Ground, Bengaluru
Umpires: Puttarangaiah Jayapal and Yeshwant Barde

- Baroda won the toss and elected to field.
- Atharva Taide (Vidarbha) made his List A debut.

20 September 2018
9:00
Scorecard

Railways; 187 (47.5 overs)	v	Himachal Pradesh; 170/5 (41.3 overs)
Karan Sharma 33 (53); Mayank Dagar 4/38 (10 overs)		Prashant Chopra 77 (93); Anureet Singh 2/26 (6.3 overs)

Himachal Pradesh won by 33 runs (VJD method)
KSCA Cricket Ground, Alur
Umpires: Abhijit Bengeri and GS Ananth Ramakrishnan

- Himachal Pradesh won the toss and elected to field.
- KD Singh (Himachal Pradesh), Karan Sharma and Harsh Tyagi (Railways) all made their List A debuts.

20 September 2018
9:00
Scorecard

Maharashtra; 245/8 (50 overs)	v	Karnataka; 107/6 (22.4 overs)
Ankit Bawne 104* (115); Abhimanyu Mithun 2/30 (10 overs)		Pavan Deshpande 31 (41); Satyajeet Bachhav 2/19 (5 overs)

Maharashtra won by 57 runs (VJD method)
M. Chinnaswamy Stadium, Bengaluru
Umpires: Ulhas Gandhe and Saiyed Khalid

- Karnataka won the toss and elected to field.

=== Round 3 ===
21 September 2018
9:00
Scorecard

Punjab; 278/7 (50 overs)	v	Vidarbha; 137 (40.5 overs)
Gurkeerat Singh 85* (80); Shrikant Wagh 3/69 (10 overs)		Ganesh Satish 60 (93); Mayank Markande 3/37 (9.5 overs)

Punjab won by 141 runs
KSCA Cricket Ground, Alur
Umpires: Saiyed Khalid and Puttarangaiah Jayapal

- Vidarbha won the toss and elected to field.

21 September 2018
9:00
Scorecard

Goa; 317/5 (50 overs)	v	Railways; 275 (47.2 overs)
Sumiran Amonkar 82 (105); Ankit Yadav 2/49 (8 overs)		Amit Paunikar 84 (99); Krishna Das 4/50 (8.2 overs)

Goa won by 42 runs
KSCA Cricket Ground, Alur
Umpires: Abhijeet Bengeri and GS Ananth Ramakrishnan

- Railways won the toss and elected to field.

21 September 2018
9:00
Scorecard

Mumbai; 362/5 (50 overs)	v	Karnataka; 274 (45 overs)
Ajinkya Rahane 148 (150); Krishnappa Gowtham 1/40 (8 overs)		Mayank Agarwal 66 (48); Shams Mulani 4/71 (10 overs)

Mumbai won by 88 runs
M. Chinnaswamy Stadium, Bengaluru
Umpires: Ulhas Gandhe and Yeshwant Barde

- Karnataka won the toss and elected to field.

=== Round 4 ===
23 September 2018
9:00
Scorecard

Mumbai; 400/5 (50 overs)	v	Railways; 227 (42.4 overs)
Shreyas Iyer 144 (118); Anureet Singh 3/73 (10 overs)		Saurabh Wakaskar 48 (39); Shams Mulani 2/50 (7.4 overs)

Mumbai won by 173 runs
M. Chinnaswamy Stadium, Bengaluru
Umpires: Chirra Ravikanthreddy and P Jayapal

- Mumbai won the toss and elected to bat.

23 September 2018
9:00
Scorecard

Maharashtra; 281/5 (50 overs)	v	Punjab; 187 (40.3 overs)
Ankit Bawne 100* (138); Mayank Markande 2/41 (10 overs)		Shubman Gill 36 (37); Satyajeet Bachhav 5/54 (9.3 overs)

Maharashtra won by 94 runs
Just Cricket Academy Ground, Bengaluru
Umpires: Ulhas Gandhe and Abhijit Bengeri

- Punjab won the toss and elected to field.
- Ashay Palkar (Maharashtra) and Sharad Lumba (Punjab) both made their List A debuts.

23 September 2018
9:00
Scorecard

Goa; 148 (45 overs)	v	Himachal Pradesh; 152/6 (32.1 overs)
Darshan Misal 30 (72); Ayush Jamwal 4/25 (10 overs)		Prashant Chopra 65 (54); Amulya Pandrekar 3/44 (10 overs)

Himachal Pradesh won by 4 wickets
KSCA Cricket Ground, Alur
Umpires: Nitin Pandit and Belur Ravi

- Goa won the toss and elected to bat.

=== Round 5 ===
24 September 2018
9:00
Scorecard

Mumbai	v	Vidarbha

Match abandoned
KSCA Cricket Ground, Alur

- No toss.
- No play was possible due to rain.

24 September 2018
9:00
Scorecard

Baroda	v	Punjab

Match abandoned
KSCA Cricket Ground, Alur

- No toss.
- No play was possible due to rain.

24 September 2018
9:00
Scorecard

Goa	v	Karnataka

Match abandoned
Just Cricket Academy Ground, Bengaluru

- No toss.
- No play was possible due to rain.

=== Round 6 ===
26 September 2018
9:00
Scorecard

Vidarbha; 297/7 (50 overs)	v	Himachal Pradesh; 298/6 (47.5 overs)
Atharva Taide 148* (145); Vinay Galetiya 2/51 (10 overs)		Ankush Bains 173* (139); Akshay Wakhare 2/60 (10 overs)

Himachal Pradesh won by 4 wickets
KSCA Cricket Ground, Alur
Umpires: Krishnaraj Srinath and P Jayapal

- Himachal Pradesh won the toss and elected to field.
- Aditya Thakare (Vidarbha) made his List A debut.

26 September 2018
9:00
Scorecard

Railways; 180 (48.2 overs)	v	Maharashtra; 186/3 (41.2 overs)
Mrunal Devdhar 64 (94); Shamshuzama Kazi 2/33 (10 overs)		Ruturaj Gaikwad 84 (93); Avinash Yadav 2/39 (10 overs)

Maharashtra won by 7 wickets
M. Chinnaswamy Stadium, Bengaluru
Umpires: Saiyed Khalid and Belur Ravi

- Railways won the toss and elected to bat.
- Manish Rao (Railways) made his List A debut.

26 September 2018
9:00
Scorecard

Karnataka; 237 (50 overs)	v	Baroda; 230/3 (43.3 overs)
Ravikumar Samarth 77 (103); Atit Sheth 4/42 (9 overs)		Kedar Devdhar 123 (128); Prasidh Krishna 1/44 (9 overs)

Baroda won by 7 wickets
Just Cricket Academy Ground, Bengaluru
Umpires: Nitin Pandit and Chirra Ravikanthreddy

- Baroda won the toss and elected to field.
- Gneshwar Naveen (Karnataka) made his List A debut.

=== Round 7 ===
28 September 2018
9:00
Scorecard

Baroda; 281/5 (50 overs)	v	Goa; 148 (42.3 overs)
Kedar Devdhar 107 (132); Krishna Das 2/67 (10 overs)		Amit Verma 59 (89); Krunal Pandya 6/41 (9 overs)

Baroda won by 133 runs
KSCA Cricket Ground, Alur
Umpires: Chirra Ravikanthreddy and P Jayapal

- Goa won the toss and elected to field.

28 September 2018
9:00
Scorecard

Maharashtra; 278 (49.5 overs)	v	Himachal Pradesh; 195 (44.2 overs)
Ruturaj Gaikwad 114 (115); Prashant Chopra 4/20 (4 overs)		Nikhil Gangta 76 (106); Samad Fallah 3/18 (7 overs)

Maharashtra won by 83 runs
KSCA Cricket Ground, Alur
Umpires: Nitin Pandit and Abhijit Bengeri

- Maharashtra won the toss and elected to bat.

28 September 2018
9:00
Scorecard

Mumbai; 245 (49 overs)	v	Punjab; 202 (44.3 overs)
Jay Bista 68 (75); Manpreet Gony 2/28 (10 overs)		Shubman Gill 40 (66); Dhawal Kulkarni 3/18 (7.3 overs)

Mumbai won by 43 runs
Just Cricket Academy Ground, Bengaluru
Umpires: Saiyed Khalid and Belur Ravi

- Punjab won the toss and elected to field.
- Sanvir Singh (Punjab) made his List A debut.

=== Round 8 ===
30 September 2018
9:00
Scorecard

Baroda; 269/9 (50 overs)	v	Railways; 89 (24.4 overs)
Aditya Waghmode 74 (99); Manish Rao 3/30 (6 overs)		Manish Rao 23* (43); Babashafi Pathan 5/25 (7.4 overs)

Baroda won by 180 runs
M. Chinnaswamy Stadium, Bengaluru
Umpires: Sivasubramaniyan Shankar and Belur Ravi

- Baroda won the toss and elected to bat.

30 September 2018
9:00
Scorecard

Vidarbha; 125 (36.2 overs)	v	Karnataka; 129/4 (32.3 overs)
Ganesh Satish 50 (68); Shreyas Gopal 3/13 (7 overs)		Kaunain Abbas 35* (50); Yash Thakur 3/22 (7 overs)

Karnataka won by 6 wickets
KSCA Cricket Ground, Alur
Umpires: Saiyed Khalid and Chirra Ravikanthreddy

- Vidarbha won the toss and elected to bat.
- Kaunain Abbas (Karnataka) made his List A debut.

30 September 2018
9:00
Scorecard

Himachal Pradesh; 269/6 (50 overs)	v	Mumbai; 270/4 (44.3 overs)
Prashant Chopra 86 (99); Shivam Dube 2/41 (10 overs)		Suryakumar Yadav 123* (103); Rishi Dhawan 2/42 (7.3 overs)

Mumbai won by 6 wickets
KSCA Cricket Ground, Alur
Umpires: Abhijit Bengeri and Krishnaraj Srinath

- Mumbai won the toss and elected to field.
- Mohmad Ajrudeen (Himachal Pradesh) made his List A debut.

=== Round 9 ===
2 October 2018
9:00
Scorecard

Punjab; 284/6 (50 overs)	v	Railways; 210 (44.3 overs)
Gurkeerat Singh 101 (96); Chandrakant Sakure 3/85 (10 overs)		Saurabh Wakaskar 104 (108); Mayank Markande 3/40 (9 overs)

Punjab won by 58 runs (VJD method)
M. Chinnaswamy Stadium, Bengaluru
Umpires: Chirra Ravikanthreddy and P Jayapal

- Punjab won the toss and elected to bat.

2 October 2018
9:00
Scorecard

Goa; 186 (49.5 overs)	v	Mumbai; 189/3 (35.3 overs)
Suyash Prabhudessai 52 (56); Dhawal Kulkarni 3/32 (9.5 overs)		Akhil Herwadkar 108* (112); Krishna Das 2/31 (7 overs)

Mumbai won by 7 wickets
Just Cricket Academy Ground, Bengaluru
Umpires: Sivasubramaniyan Shankar and Belur Ravi

- Goa won the toss and elected to bat.
- Vishamber Kahlon (Goa) made his List A debut.

2 October 2018
9:00
Scorecard

Maharashtra; 201/8 (50 overs)	v	Vidarbha; 205/7 (49.2 overs)
Ankit Bawne 62 (102); Sanjay Raghunath 2/20 (5 overs)		Akshay Wadkar 82* (120); Samad Fallah 2/33 (9.2 overs)

Vidarbha won by 3 wickets
KSCA Cricket Ground, Alur
Umpires: Abhijit Bengeri and Saiyed Khalid

- Maharashtra won the toss and elected to bat.
- Darshan Nalkande (Vidarbha) made his List A debut.

=== Round 10 ===
4 October 2018
9:00
Scorecard

Baroda; 153 (41.2 overs)	v	Himachal Pradesh; 41/1 (11.3 overs)
Kedar Devdhar 41 (53); Mayank Dagar 5/27 (10 overs)		Priyanshu Khanduri 33 (45); Lukman Meriwala 1/19 (5.3 overs)

No result
KSCA Cricket Ground, Alur
Umpires: Sivasubramaniyan Shankar and Belur Ravi

- Himachal Pradesh won the toss and elected to field.

4 October 2018
9:00
Scorecard

Karnataka; 229/5 (42.3 overs)	v	Railways
Kaunain Abbas 46 (53); Manjeet Singh 2/30 (8 overs)

No result
M. Chinnaswamy Stadium, Bengaluru
Umpires: Krishnaraj Srinath and Saiyed Khalid

- Railways won the toss and elected to field.

4 October 2018
9:00
Scorecard

Punjab; 359/4 (50 overs)	v	Goa; 46/2 (10 overs)
Anmolpreet Singh 141 (114); Amit Verma 1/54 (9 overs)		Amogh Sunil Desai 30* (29); Mayank Markande 1/5 (2 overs)

No result
KSCA Cricket Ground, Alur
Umpires: Chirra Ravikanthreddy and P Jayapal

- Goa won the toss and elected to field.

=== Round 11 ===
6 October 2018
9:00
Scorecard

Railways; 226/8 (50 overs)	v	Vidarbha; 176/3 (37 overs)
Madhur Khatri 58 (43); Darshan Nalkande 3/42 (8 overs)		Ganesh Satish 53* (65); Manish Rao 1/25 (7 overs)

Vidarbha won by 15 runs (VJD method)
KSCA Cricket Ground, Alur
Umpires: Abhijit Bengeri and Chirra Ravikanthreddy

- Vidarbha won the toss and elected to field.

6 October 2018
9:00
Scorecard

Maharashtra	v	Mumbai

Match abandoned
Just Cricket Academy Ground, Bengaluru

- No toss.
- No play was possible due to rain.

6 October 2018
9:00
Scorecard

Karnataka; 257/8 (38 overs)	v	Himachal Pradesh; 162 (25.3 overs)
Ravikumar Samarth 98 (97); Rishi Dhawan 3/57 (8 overs)		Prashant Chopra 67 (45); Krishnappa Gowtham 4/26 (5 overs)

Karnataka won by 95 runs
M. Chinnaswamy Stadium, Bengaluru
Umpires: Sivasubramaniyan Shankar and Krishnaraj Srinath

- Himachal Pradesh won the toss and elected to field.
- The match was reduced to 38 overs per side due to rain.

=== Round 12 ===
8 October 2018
9:00
Scorecard

Vidarbha; 218 (48.2 overs)	v	Goa; 217/9 (50 overs)
Faiz Fazal 49 (78); Darshan Misal 4/52 (9.2 overs)		Amit Verma 45 (54); Darshan Nalkande 3/37 (10 overs)

Vidarbha won by 1 run
KSCA Cricket Ground, Alur
Umpires: Abhijit Bengeri and Chirra Ravikanthreddy

- Vidarbha won the toss and elected to bat.

8 October 2018
9:00
Scorecard

Karnataka; 296 (48.2 overs)	v	Punjab; 297/4 (48.5 overs)
BR Sharath 70 (69); Siddarth Kaul 5/41 (9.2 overs)		Anmolpreet Singh 138 (106); Krishnappa Gowtham 1/49 (10 overs)

Punjab won by 6 wickets
M. Chinnaswamy Stadium, Bengaluru
Umpires: Sivasubramaniyan Shankar and Saiyed Khalid

- Punjab won the toss and elected to field

8 October 2018
9:00
Scorecard

Baroda; 206/8 (50 overs)	v	Maharashtra; 207/5 (44.3 overs)
Yusuf Pathan 64* (66); Samad Fallah 3/21 (10 overs)		Naushad Shaikh 76 (77); Atit Sheth 3/36 (10 overs)

Maharashtra won by 5 wickets
KSCA Cricket Ground, Alur
Umpires: Krishnaraj Srinath and Belur Ravi

- Baroda won the toss and elected to bat.
