= 2019–20 Vijay Hazare Trophy Group A =

Cricket tournament

- Dates: 24 September – 16 October 2019
- Administrator(s): BCCI
- Cricket format: List A cricket
- Tournament format(s): Round-robin
- Participants: 9

The 2019–20 Vijay Hazare Trophy is the 18th season of the Vijay Hazare Trophy, a List A cricket tournament in India. It is being contested by 38 teams, divided into four groups, with nine teams in Group A. The group stage started on 24 September 2019. The top five teams across Group A and Group B progressed to the quarter-finals of the competition.

Seventeen out of the first thirty matches that were scheduled to be played across all four groups were abandoned or finished in a no result. Therefore, the Board of Control for Cricket in India (BCCI) issued a revised schedule for the rain-affected matches. Group A is now scheduled to finish on 16 October 2019, three days later than originally planned.

On 12 October 2019, in the match between Kerala and Goa, Kerala's Sanju Samson scored the fastest double century in List A cricket. It was the highest individual total in the Vijay Hazare Trophy, with an unbeaten 212 runs from 129 balls. It was also the highest total made by a wicket-keeper in a List A cricket match. The partnership between him and Sachin Baby was the highest List A partnership for the third wicket. It was also the fourth-highest List A partnership in the history of the game and highest in India. On 16 October 2019, Yashasvi Jaiswal became the youngest player to score a double century in List A cricket.

After the final group matches, Chhattisgarh, Karnataka and Mumbai had all progressed from Group A to the knockout phase of the tournament.

== Points table ==
Pos	Team	Pld	W	L	T	NR	Pts	NRR
1	Karnataka	8	7	1	0	0	28	1.170
4	Chhattisgarh	8	5	2	0	1	22	0.066
5	Mumbai	8	4	2	0	2	20	0.832
7	Hyderabad	8	4	3	0	1	18	0.734
8	Jharkhand	8	4	4	0	0	16	−0.231
9	Kerala	8	4	4	0	0	16	0.435
15	Saurashtra	8	3	5	0	0	12	−0.648
17	Andhra	8	1	6	0	1	6	−1.122
18	Goa	8	1	6	0	1	6	−1.616

- Top five teams across Groups A and B advanced to the knockout stage.
- Bottom two teams across Groups A and B relegated to the Elite Group C for the next season.

== Fixtures ==
=== Round 1 ===
26 September 2019
Scorecard

Kerala; 185/9 (34 overs)	v	Saurashtra; 187/7 (33.4 overs)
Vinoop Manoharan 47 (30); Chirag Jani 3/22 (7 overs)		Arpit Vasavada 92* (85); Sandeep Warrier 2/31 (6 overs)

Saurashtra won by 3 wickets
Just Cricket Academy Ground, Bangalore
Umpires: Nitin Pandit and Nitin Menon

- Saurashtra won the toss and elected to field.
- The match was reduced to 34 overs per side due to rain.
- Sijomon Joseph (Kerala) and Vishvaraj Jadeja (Saurashtra) both made their List A debuts.

26 September 2019
Scorecard

Karnataka; 285/9 (50 overs)	v	Jharkhand; 162 (37.5 overs)
Pavan Deshpande 70 (59); Rahul Shukla 4/43 (10 overs)		Saurabh Tiwary 43 (54); Krishnappa Gowtham 5/43 (7.5 overs)

Karnataka won by 123 runs
M. Chinnaswamy Stadium, Bangalore
Umpires: Ulhas Gandhe and Virender Sharma

- Jharkhand won the toss and elected to field.
- Shubham Kumar Singh (Jharkhand), Devdutt Padikkal and Krishnamurthy Siddharth (Karnataka) all made their List A debuts.

26 September 2019
Scorecard

Goa; 107/9 (21 overs)	v	Andhra; 112/3 (20.2 overs)
Amogh Desai 23 (31); Prithvi Raj 5/21 (5 overs)		Prasanth Kumar 46* (44); Heramb Parab 1/17 (4 overs)

Andhra won by 7 wickets
Alur Cricket Ground, Alur
Umpires: Vineet Kulkarni and Abhijit Deshmukh

- Andhra won the toss and elected to field.
- The match was reduced to 21 overs per side due to rain.
- Pinninti Tapaswi, Karan Shinde (Andhra), Vaibhav Govekar, Aditya Kaushik and Heramb Parab (Goa) all made their List A debuts.

=== Round 2 ===
28 September 2019
Scorecard

Mumbai; 317/5 (50 overs)	v	Chhattisgarh; 318/5 (49.5 overs)
Aditya Tare 90 (107); Shashank Singh 2/54 (10 overs)		Amandeep Khare 117* (94); Shams Mulani 3/38 (10 overs)

Chhattisgarh won by 5 wickets
Alur Cricket Ground, Alur
Umpires: Nitin Pandit and Nitin Menon

- Chhattisgarh won the toss and elected to field.
- Yashasvi Jaiswal (Mumbai) made his List A debut.

28 September 2019
Scorecard

Hyderabad; 252/5 (50 overs)	v	Saurashtra; 131 (39.1 overs)
Tanmay Agarwal 79 (98); Jaydev Unadkat 2/46 (10 overs)		Sheldon Jackson 39 (53); Bavanaka Sandeep 5/26 (9.1 overs)

Hyderabad won by 121 runs
Alur Cricket Ground, Alur
Umpires: Vineet Kulkarni and Abhijit Deshmukh

- Saurashtra won the toss and elected to field.
- Tilak Varma, Jamalpur Mallikarjun and Ajay Dev Goud (Hyderabad) all made their List A debuts.

28 September 2019
Scorecard

Karnataka; 294 (49.5 overs)	v	Kerala; 234 (46.4 overs)
KL Rahul 131 (122); KM Asif 3/59 (10 overs)		Vishnu Vinod 104 (123); Ronit More 3/42 (9 overs)

Karnataka won by 60 runs
Alur Cricket Ground, Alur
Umpires: Ulhas Gandhe and Virender Sharma

- Kerala won the toss and elected to field.

=== Round 3 ===
29 September 2019
Scorecard

Chhattisgarh; 268/9 (50 overs)	v	Andhra; 212 (46.5 overs)
Ashutosh Singh 75 (93); Prithvi Raj 3/63 (10 overs)		Prasanth Kumar 44 (80); Shashank Singh 3/37 (8 overs)

Chhattisgarh won by 56 runs
KSCA Cricket Ground, Alur
Umpires: Ulhas Gandhe and Virender Sharma

- Andhra won the toss and elected to field.

29 September 2019
Scorecard

Goa; 266/8 (50 overs)	v	Jharkhand; 224 (48.1 overs)
Aditya Kaushik 117 (110); Rahul Shukla 6/33 (10 overs)		Ishan Kishan 43 (69); Darshan Misal 4/35 (7.1 overs)

Goa won by 42 runs
Just Cricket Academy Ground, Bengaluru
Umpires: Abhijit Deshmukh and Nitin Menon

- Jharkhand won the toss and elected to field.
- Shubham Desai (Goa) made his List A debut.

29 September 2019
Scorecard

Kerala; 226/9 (50 overs)	v	Hyderabad; 165 (44.4 overs)
Sanju Samson 36 (44); Ajay Dev Goud 3/52 (9 overs)		Tanmay Agarwal 69 (103); KM Asif 4/34 (10 overs)

Kerala won by 62 runs
KSCA Cricket Ground, Alur
Umpires: Nitin Pandit and Vineet Kulkarni

- Hyderabad won the toss and elected to field.
- Ponnan Rahul (Kerala) made his List A debut.

=== Round 4 ===
1 October 2019
Scorecard

Hyderabad; 198/9 (50 overs)	v	Karnataka; 177 (45.2 overs)
Ambati Rayudu 87* (111); Ronit More 2/31 (8 overs)		Devdutt Padikkal 60 (104); Bavanaka Sandeep 4/35 (9 overs)

Hyderabad won by 21 runs
KSCA Cricket Ground, Alur
Umpires: Nitin Pandit and Virender Sharma

- Karnataka won the toss and elected to field.

1 October 2019
Scorecard

Saurashtra; 245/9 (50 overs)	v	Mumbai; 248/5 (48 overs)
Arpit Vasavada 59 (75); Shardul Thakur 3/36 (10 overs)		Suryakumar Yadav 85* (71); Kushang Patel 2/33 (9 overs)

Mumbai won by 5 wickets
KSCA Cricket Ground, Alur
Umpires: Vineet Kulkarni and Nitin Menon

- Mumbai won the toss and elected to field.

=== Round 5 ===
2 October 2019
Scorecard

Saurashtra; 298/3 (50 overs)	v	Andhra; 145 (37.3 overs)
Samarth Vyas 124* (138); Manish Golamaru 1/40 (10 overs)		Karan Shinde 52 (76); Jaydev Unadkat 3/18 (5.3 overs)

Saurashtra won by 153 runs
KSCA Cricket Ground, Alur
Umpires: Vineet Kulkarni and Abhijit Deshmukh

- Saurashtra won the toss and elected to bat.

2 October 2019
Scorecard

Karnataka; 285/7 (50 overs)	v	Chhattisgarh; 206 (44.4 overs)
Manish Pandey 142* (118); Puneet Datey 2/60 (10 overs)		Amandeep Khare 43 (62); Prasidh Krishna 3/31 (8 overs)

Karnataka won by 79 runs
M. Chinnaswamy Stadium, Bangalore
Umpires: Ulhas Gandhe and Nitin Menon

- Chhattisgarh won the toss and elected to field.
- Vasuki Koushik (Karnataka) made his List A debut.

2 October 2019
Scorecard

Jharkhand; 258/5 (36 overs)	v	Kerala; 253 (36 overs)
Kumar Deobrat 54 (45); Sandeep Warrier 3/38 (7 overs)		Sachin Baby 60 (49); Anukul Roy 4/31 (7 overs)

Jharkhand won by 5 runs
Just Cricket Academy Ground, Bangalore
Umpires: Nitin Pandit and Virender Sharma

- Kerala won the toss and elected to field.
- The match was reduced to 36 overs per side due to a wet outfield.
- Vivekanand Tiwari (Jharkhand) made his List A debut.

=== Round 6 ===
4 October 2019
Scorecard

Chhattisgarh	v	Goa

Match abandoned
KSCA Cricket Ground, Alur
Umpires: Ulhas Gandhe and Vineet Kulkarni

- No toss.
- No play was possible due to a wet outfield.

4 October 2019
Scorecard

Hyderabad	v	Mumbai

Match abandoned
KSCA Cricket Ground, Alur
Umpires: Abhijit Deshmukh and Virender Sharma

- No toss.
- No play was possible due to a wet outfield.

=== Round 7 ===
5 October 2019
Scorecard

Andhra; 51/2 (8.2 overs)	v	Mumbai
Prasanth Kumar 30* (19); Tushar Deshpande 1/12 (1 over)

No result
KSCA Cricket Ground, Alur
Umpires: Nitin Pandit and Virender Sharma

- Rain during Andhra's innings prevented any further play.

5 October 2019
Scorecard

Hyderabad; 192/7 (34 overs)	v	Jharkhand; 193/4 (33.4 overs)
Ambati Rayudu 69 (54); Anukul Roy 2/30 (6 overs)		Saurabh Tiwary 61* (47); Chama Milind 2/25 (7 overs)

Jharkhand won by 6 wickets
Just Cricket Academy Ground, Bangalore
Umpires: Ulhas Gandhe and Nitin Menon

- Hyderabad (India) won the toss and elected to bat.
- The match was reduced to 34 overs per side due to a wet outfield.

=== Round 8 ===
7 October 2019
Scorecard

Karnataka; 278/7 (50 overs)	v	Andhra; 225 (46.5 overs)
Manish Pandey 50 (56); Ashwin Hebbar 2/27 (6 overs)		Prasanth Kumar 78 (104); Shreyas Gopal 4/48 (10 overs)

Karnataka won by 53 runs
Just Cricket Academy Ground, Bengaluru
Umpires: Ulhas Gandhe and Virender Sharma

- Andhra won the toss and elected to field.

7 October 2019
Scorecard

Chhattisgarh; 246/8 (47 overs)	v	Saurashtra; 181 (41.3 overs)
Shashank Chandrakar 53 (59); Kushang Patel 3/47 (8 overs)		Sheldon Jackson 75 (78); Sumit Ruikar 5/32 (8.3 overs)

Chhattisgarh won by 65 runs
KSCA Cricket Ground, Alur
Umpires: Nitin Pandit and Vineet Kulkarni

- Saurashtra won the toss and elected to field.

7 October 2019
Scorecard

Goa; 122 (37.4 overs)	v	Hyderabad; 126/5 (22.2 overs)
Amogh Sunil Desai 55 (87); Mohammed Siraj 4/20 (9 overs)		Tanmay Agarwal 66* (71); Heramb Parab 1/21 (6 overs)

Hyderabad won by 5 wickets
KSCA Cricket Ground, Alur
Umpires: Abhijit Deshmukh and Nitin Menon

- Goa won the toss and elected to bat.

=== Round 9 ===
8 October 2019
Scorecard

Kerala; 296/9 (50 overs)	v	Chhattisgarh; 231 (46 overs)
Vishnu Vinod 123 (91); Pratap Singh 3/82 (10 overs)		Ashutosh Singh 77 (89); MD Nidheesh 4/54 (10 overs)

Kerala won by 65 runs
KSCA Cricket Ground, Alur
Umpires: Ulhas Gandhe and Vineet Kulkarni

- Chhattisgarh won the toss and elected to field.
- Lavin Coster (Chhattisgarh) made his List A debut.

8 October 2019
Scorecard

Mumbai; 362/4 (50 overs)	v	Goa; 232 (48.1 overs)
Yashasvi Jaiswal 113 (123); Amit Verma 2/65 (10 overs)		Snehal Kauthankar 50 (72); Shams Mulani 3/38 (10 overs)

Mumbai won by 130 runs
KSCA Cricket Ground, Alur
Umpires: Nitin Pandit and Virender Sharma

- Mumbai won the toss and elected to bat.
- Shashank Attarde (Mumbai) made his List A debut.

8 October 2019
Scorecard

Jharkhand; 259 (48.5 overs)	v	Saurashtra; 129 (37.4 overs)
Utkarsh Singh 100 (114); Jaydev Unadkat 3/34 (9 overs)		Arpit Vasavada 47 (74); Utkarsh Singh 4/34 (10 overs)

Jharkhand won by 130 runs
KSCA Cricket Ground, Alur
Umpires: Abhijit Deshmukh and Nitin Menon

- Jharkhand won the toss and elected to bat.

=== Round 10 ===
10 October 2019
Scorecard

Hyderabad; 171/7 (20 overs)	v	Andhra; 164/6 (20 overs)
Tilak Varma 83 (59); Prithvi Raj 2/36 (4 overs)		Ricky Bhui 58 (40); Chama Milind 3/39 (4 overs)

Hyderabad won by 7 runs
KSCA Cricket Ground, Alur
Umpires: Nitin Pandit and Nitin Menon

- Hyderabad won the toss and elected to bat.
- The match was reduced to 20 overs per side due to a wet outfield.

10 October 2019
Scorecard

Jharkhand; 119 (29 overs)	v	Chhattisgarh; 123/3 (28.3 overs)
Virat Singh 32 (36); Veer Pratap Singh 5/29 (6 overs)		Ashutosh Singh 54* (82); Anand Singh 2/21 (6 overs)

Chhattisgarh won by 7 wickets
Just Cricket Academy Ground, Bangalore
Umpires: Ulhas Gandhe and Virender Sharma

- Chhattisgarh won the toss and elected to field.
- The match was reduced to 31 overs per side due to a wet outfield.

10 October 2019
Scorecard

Karnataka; 312/7 (50 overs)	v	Mumbai; 303 (48.1 overs)
Devdutt Padikkal 79 (85); Dhrumil Matkar 1/33 (10 overs)		Shivam Dube 118 (67); Abhimanyu Mithun 3/40 (9.1 overs)

Karnataka won by 9 runs
M. Chinnaswamy Stadium, Bangalore
Umpires: Vineet Kulkarni and Abhijit Deshmukh

- Mumbai won the toss and elected to field.

=== Round 11 ===
12 October 2019
Scorecard

Andhra; 265/6 (50 overs)	v	Jharkhand; 266/7 (49.4 overs)
Kranthi Kumar 72 (99); Varun Aaron 2/54 (10 overs)		Virat Singh 74* (58); Prithvi Raj 2/58 (10 overs)

Jharkhand won by 3 wickets
KSCA Cricket Ground, Alur
Umpires: Ulhas Gandhe and Vineet Kulkarni

- Andhra won the toss and elected to bat.
- Kranthi Kumar (Andhra) made his List A debut.

12 October 2019
Scorecard

Kerala; 377/3 (50 overs)	v	Goa; 273/8 (50 overs)
Sanju Samson 212* (129); Lakshay Garg 1/73 (10 overs)		Aditya Kaushik 58 (91); Sandeep Warrier 2/44 (10 overs)

Kerala won by 104 runs
KSCA Cricket Ground, Alur
Umpires: Nitin Pandit and Virender Sharma

- Kerala won the toss and elected to bat.
- Tunish Sawkar (Goa) made his List A debut.

12 October 2019
Scorecard

Saurashtra; 212 (47.2 overs)	v	Karnataka; 213/2 (36.4 overs)
Prerak Mankad 86 (90); Prasidh Krishna 5/19 (8.2 overs)		Devdutt Padikkal 103* (104); Prerak Mankad 2/33 (8 overs)

Karnataka won by 8 wickets
M. Chinnaswamy Stadium, Bengaluru
Umpires: Abhijit Deshmukh and Nitin Menon

- Karnataka won the toss and elected to field.

=== Round 12 ===
14 October 2019
Scorecard

Chhattisgarh; 171/5 (23 overs)	v	Hyderabad; 147 (19.5 overs)
Ashutosh Singh 66 (50); Chama Milind 2/46 (5 overs)		Tilak Varma 41 (37); Pratap Singh 4/23 (3.5 overs)

Chhattisgarh won by 24 runs
KSCA Cricket Ground, Alur
Umpires: Ulhas Gandhe and Vineet Kulkarni

- Chhattisgarh won the toss and elected to bat.
- The match was reduced to 23 overs per side due to a wet outfield.

14 October 2019
Scorecard

Goa; 154/9 (28 overs)	v	Saurashtra; 157/5 (26.5 overs)
Vaibhav Govekar 50 (49); Jaydev Unadkat 3/28 (6 overs)		Prerak Mankad 41* (29); Lakshay Garg 2/39 (5.5 overs)

Saurashtra won by 5 wickets
KSCA Cricket Ground, Alur
Umpires: Abhijit Deshmukh and Virender Sharma

- Goa won the toss and elected to bat.
- The match was reduced to 28 overs per side due to a wet outfield.

14 October 2019
Scorecard

Kerala; 199 (48.4 overs)	v	Mumbai; 202/2 (38.2 overs)
Robin Uthappa 43 (45); Shardul Thakur 3/40 (10 overs)		Yashasvi Jaiswal 122 (132); Vishnu Vinod 2/16 (4.2 overs)

Mumbai won by 8 wickets
Just Cricket Academy Ground, Bengaluru
Umpires: Nitin Pandit and Nitin Menon

- Kerala won the toss and elected to bat.

=== Round 13 ===
16 October 2019
Scorecard

Mumbai; 358/3 (50 overs)	v	Jharkhand; 319 (46.4 overs)
Yashasvi Jaiswal 203 (154); Vivekanand Tiwari 2/32 (6 overs)		Virat Singh 100 (77); Dhawal Kulkarni 5/37 (8.4 overs)

Mumbai won by 38 runs
KSCA Cricket Ground, Alur
Umpires: Abhijit Deshmukh and Virender Sharma

- Mumbai won the toss and elected to bat.

16 October 2019
Scorecard

Andhra; 230/6 (50 overs)	v	Kerala; 233/4 (39.4 overs)
Ricky Bhui 58 (81); Sudhesan Midhun 2/15 (10 overs)		Vishnu Vinod 139 (89); Girinath Reddy 3/27 (6 overs)

Kerala won by 6 wickets
M. Chinnaswamy Stadium, Bangalore
Umpires: Nitin Pandit and Vineet Kulkarni

- Andhra won the toss and elected to bat.

16 October 2019
Scorecard

Goa; 171 (47.5 overs)	v	Karnataka; 177/2 (34.2 overs)
Aditya Kaushik 75 (86); Praveen Dubey 3/29 (10 overs)		Devdutt Padikkal 102* (116); Lakshay Garg 1/27 (6 overs)

Karnataka won by 8 wickets
KSCA Cricket Ground, Alur
Umpires: Ulhas Gandhe and Nitin Menon

- Karnataka won the toss and elected to field.
