= Vikrant =

Vikrant or Vikrānta, a name of Indian origin that means powerful or brave, may refer to:

== People ==
- Vikranth (born 1984), Indian actor
- Vikrant Auti (born 1994), Indian cricketer
- Vikrant Baliyan, India mixed martial arts fighter
- Vikrant Bhargava (born 1972), Indian-born British entrepreneur
- Vikrant Chaturvedi (born 1970), Indian actor
- Vikrant Massey (born 1987), Indian actor
- Vikrant Rajput (born 1992), Indian cricketer
- Vikrant Shetty (born 1983), UAE cricketer
- Vikrant Singh Rajpoot (born 1986), Indian film actor
- Vikrant Rona, titular character of the 2022 Indian thriller film Vikrant Rona, portrayed by Sudeepa
- Vikrant Kaul, fictional character in the 2025 Indian film War 2, portrayed by Anil Kapoor
- Vikrant, fictional character in the 2026 Indian film Udta Teer, portrayed by Ayushmann Khurrana

== Aircraft carriers ==
- INS Vikrant (1961), decommissioned in 1997
- Vikrant-class aircraft carrier
  - INS Vikrant (2013), commissioned in 2022
