= List of 2021 Indian Premier League personnel changes =

2021 Indian Premier League Auction

General information
- Sport: Cricket
- Date: 18 February 2021
- Time: 3 PM IST
- Location: Chennai
- Networks: Star Sports & Disney+ Hotstar

Overview
- League: Indian Premier League
- Teams: 8

This is a list of all personnel changes for the 2021 Indian Premier League (IPL).

== Pre-auction ==
The BCCI set the deadline of 20 January 2021 for the list of retained and released players for IPL franchise teams. The trading window remained open till 11 February 2021 and was closed for one week, before being reopened on 19 February 2021.

=== Transfers ===
Player	Nationality	Salary Before	From	To	Salary After	Date	Ref
Daniel Sams ^{REP}	Australia	₹20 lakh	Delhi Capitals	Royal Challengers Bangalore		20 January 2021	
Harshal Patel	India	₹20 lakh	Delhi Capitals	Royal Challengers Bangalore		20 January 2021	
Robin Uthappa	India	₹3 crore	Rajasthan Royals	Chennai Super Kings		21 January 2021	

^{↓} ↓: Player(s) was/were swapped with the player(s) mentioned in the next row(s).
^{↑} ↑: Player(s) was/were swapped with the player(s) mentioned in the previous row(s).
^{REP} REP: Players who were unsold originally in the 2020 auction but were later signed up as a replacement player.

=== Released players ===
The released players were announced on 20 January 2021. Steve Smith, Aaron Finch and Glenn Maxwell were the prominent names among the released players. Piyush Chawla, the costliest Indian player at the 2020 auction, was also released.

Player	Nationality	Salary	Ref
Chennai Super Kings
Kedar Jadhav	India	₹7.8 crore	
Piyush Chawla	India	₹6.75 crore	
Shane Watson (Note: Player retired after the 2020 IPL)	Australia	₹4 crore	
Murali Vijay	India	₹2 crore	
Harbhajan Singh	India	₹2 crore	
Monu Kumar Singh	India	₹20 lakh	
Delhi Capitals
Alex Carey	Australia	₹2.40 crore	
Jason Roy	England	₹1.5 crore	
Mohit Sharma	India	₹50 lakh	
Keemo Paul	Guyana	₹50 lakh	
Sandeep Lamichhane	Nepal	₹20 lakh	
Tushar Deshpande	India	₹20 lakh	
Kolkata Knight Riders
Tom Banton	England	₹1 crore	
Harry Gurney	England	₹75 lakh	
Chris Green	Australia	₹20 lakh	
Siddhesh Lad	India	₹20 lakh	
Nikhil Naik	India	₹20 lakh	
M Siddharth	India	₹20 lakh	
Mumbai Indians
Nathan Coulter-Nile	Australia	₹8 crore	
Lasith Malinga	Sri Lanka	₹2 crore	
Sherfane Rutherford	Guyana	₹2 crore	
Mitchell McClenaghan	New Zealand	₹1 crore	
Prince Balwant Rai	India	₹20 lakh	
Digvijay Deshmukh	India	₹20 lakh	
James Pattinson^{[REP]}	Australia	₹1 crore	

Player	Nationality	Salary	Ref
Punjab Kings
Glenn Maxwell	Australia	₹10.75 crore	
Sheldon Cottrell	Jamaica	₹8.50 crore	
Krishnappa Gowtham	India	₹6.20 crore	
Karun Nair	India	₹5.60 crore	
Mujeeb Ur Rahman	Afghanistan	₹4 crore	
James Neesham	New Zealand	₹50 lakh	
Hardus Viljoen	South Africa	₹75 lakh	
J Suchith	India	₹20 lakh	
Tajinder Singh	India	₹20 lakh	
Rajasthan Royals
Steve Smith	Australia	₹12.5 crore	
Ankit Rajpoot	India	₹3 crore	
Varun Aaron	India	₹2.4 crore	
Tom Curran	England	₹1 crore	
Oshane Thomas	Jamaica	₹50 lakh	
Shashank Singh	India	₹30 lakh	
Akash Singh	India	₹20 lakh	
Aniruddha Joshi	India	₹20 lakh	
Royal Challengers Bangalore
Chris Morris	South Africa	₹10 crore	
Shivam Dube	India	₹5 crore	
Aaron Finch	Australia	₹4.4 crore	
Umesh Yadav	India	₹4.2 crore	
Dale Steyn	South Africa	₹2 crore	
Parthiv Patel	India	₹1.7 crore	
Moeen Ali	England	₹1.7 crore	
Pawan Negi	India	₹1 crore	
Gurkeerat Singh Mann	India	₹50 lakh	
Isuru Udana	Sri Lanka	₹50 lakh	
Sunrisers Hyderabad
Billy Stanlake	Australia	₹50 lakh	
Fabian Allen	Jamaica	₹50 lakh	
Yarra Prithvi Raj ^{REP}	India	₹20 lakh	
R Sanjay Yadav	India	₹20 lakh	
Bavanaka Sandeep	India	₹20 lakh	

^{REP} REP: Players who were unsold originally in the 2020 auction but were later signed up as a replacement player.

=== Retained players ===
The retained players were announced on 20 January 2021.

Player	Nationality	Salary
Chennai Super Kings
MS Dhoni	India	₹15 crore (US$1.6 million)
Suresh Raina	India	₹11 crore (US$1.1 million)
Ravindra Jadeja	India	₹7 crore (US$730,000)
Dwayne Bravo	Trinidad and Tobago	₹6.4 crore (US$660,000)
Sam Curran	England	₹5.5 crore (US$570,000)
Karn Sharma	India	₹5 crore (US$520,000)
Shardul Thakur	India	₹2.6 crore (US$270,000)
Ambati Rayudu	India	₹2.2 crore (US$230,000)
Josh Hazlewood	Australia	₹2 crore (US$210,000)
Faf du Plessis	South Africa	₹1.6 crore (US$170,000)
Imran Tahir	South Africa	₹1 crore (US$100,000)
Deepak Chahar	India	₹80 lakh (US$83,000)
Lungisani Ngidi	South Africa	₹50 lakh (US$52,000)
Mitchell Santner	New Zealand	₹50 lakh (US$52,000)
KM Asif	India	₹40 lakh (US$42,000)
Jagadeesan Narayan	India	₹20 lakh (US$21,000)
Ruturaj Gaikwad	India	₹20 lakh (US$21,000)
R Sai Kishore	India	₹20 lakh (US$21,000)
Delhi Capitals
Rishabh Pant	India	₹8 crore (US$830,000) (Note: Pant was retained at a salary of ₹8 crore (US$830,000) but as per the IPL rules, the actual purse deduction for the Delhi team was ₹15 crore (US$1.6 million).)
Shimron Hetmyer	Guyana	₹7.75 crore (US$800,000)
Ravichandran Ashwin	India	₹7.6 crore (US$790,000)
Shreyas Iyer	India	₹7 crore (US$730,000)
Ajinkya Rahane	India	₹5.25 crore (US$550,000)
Shikhar Dhawan	India	₹5.2 crore (US$540,000)
Axar Patel	India	₹5 crore (US$520,000)
Marcus Stoinis	Australia	₹4.8 crore (US$500,000)
Kagiso Rabada	South Africa	₹4.2 crore (US$440,000)
Amit Mishra	India	₹4 crore (US$420,000)
Chris Woakes	England	₹1.5 crore (US$160,000)
Prithvi Shaw	India	₹1.2 crore (US$120,000)
Mark Wood	England	₹1.1 crore (US$110,000)
Anrich Nortje ^{REP}	South Africa	₹89.82 lakh (US$93,000)
Avesh Khan	India	₹70 lakh (US$73,000)
Lalit Yadav	India	₹20 lakh (US$21,000)
Praveen Dubey	India	₹20 lakh (US$21,000)
Kolkata Knight Riders
Pat Cummins	Australia	₹15.50 crore (US$1.6 million)
Sunil Narine	Trinidad and Tobago	₹8.5 crore (US$880,000) (Note: Narine was retained at a salary of ₹8.5 crore (US$880,000) but as per the IPL rules, the actual purse deduction for the Kolkata team was ₹12.5 crore (US$1.3 million).)
Andre Russell	Jamaica	₹7 crore (US$730,000) (Note: Russell was retained at a salary of ₹7 crore (US$730,000) but as per the IPL rules, the actual purse deduction for the Kolkata team was ₹8.5 crore (US$880,000).)
Dinesh Karthik	India	₹7.4 crore (US$770,000)
Kuldeep Yadav	India	₹5.8 crore (US$600,000)
Eoin Morgan	England	₹5.25 crore (US$550,000)
Varun Chakravarthy	India	₹4 crore (US$420,000)
Nitish Rana	India	₹3.4 crore (US$350,000)
Kamlesh Nagarkoti	India	₹3.2 crore (US$330,000)
Shivam Mavi	India	₹3 crore (US$310,000)
Shubman Gill	India	₹1.8 crore (US$190,000)
Lockie Ferguson	New Zealand	₹1.6 crore (US$170,000)
Rinku Singh	India	₹80 lakh (US$83,000)
Rahul Tripathi	India	₹60 lakh (US$62,000)
Tim Seifert ^{REP}	New Zealand	₹50 lakh (US$52,000)
Prasidh Krishna	India	₹20 lakh (US$21,000)
Sandeep Warrier	India	₹20 lakh (US$21,000)
Mumbai Indians
Rohit Sharma	India	₹15 crore (US$1.6 million)
Hardik Pandya	India	₹11 crore (US$1.1 million)
Krunal Pandya	India	₹8.8 crore (US$910,000)
Jasprit Bumrah	India	₹7 crore (US$730,000)
Ishan Kishan	India	₹6.2 crore (US$640,000)
Kieron Pollard	Trinidad and Tobago	₹5.4 crore (US$560,000)
Suryakumar Yadav	India	₹3.2 crore (US$330,000)
Trent Boult	New Zealand	₹3.2 crore (US$330,000)
Quinton de Kock	South Africa	₹2.8 crore (US$290,000)
Chris Lynn	Australia	₹2 crore (US$210,000)
Rahul Chahar	India	₹1.9 crore (US$200,000)
Anmolpreet Singh	India	₹80 lakh (US$83,000)
Dhawal Kulkarni	India	₹75 lakh (US$78,000)
Jayant Yadav	India	₹50 lakh (US$52,000)
Saurabh Tiwary	India	₹50 lakh (US$52,000)
Aditya Tare	India	₹20 lakh (US$21,000)
Anukul Roy	India	₹20 lakh (US$21,000)
Mohsin Khan	India	₹20 lakh (US$21,000)

Player	Nationality	Salary
Punjab Kings
KL Rahul	India	₹11 crore (US$1.1 million)
Mohammed Shami	India	₹4.8 crore (US$500,000)
Nicholas Pooran	Trinidad and Tobago	₹4.2 crore (US$440,000)
Chris Jordan	England	₹3 crore (US$310,000)
Chris Gayle	Jamaica	₹2 crore (US$210,000)
Ravi Bishnoi	India	₹2 crore (US$210,000)
Mandeep Singh	India	₹1.4 crore (US$150,000)
Mayank Agarwal	India	₹1 crore (US$100,000)
Prabhsimran Singh	India	₹55 lakh (US$57,000)
Deepak Hooda	India	₹50 lakh (US$52,000)
Darshan Nalkande	India	₹30 lakh (US$31,000)
Sarfaraz Khan	India	₹25 lakh (US$26,000)
Arshdeep Singh	India	₹20 lakh (US$21,000)
Harpreet Brar	India	₹20 lakh (US$21,000)
Murugan Ashwin	India	₹20 lakh (US$21,000)
Ishan Porel	India	₹20 lakh (US$21,000)
Rajasthan Royals
Ben Stokes	England	₹12.5 crore (US$1.3 million)
Sanju Samson	India	₹8 crore (US$830,000)
Jofra Archer	England	₹7.2 crore (US$750,000)
Jos Buttler	England	₹4.4 crore (US$460,000)
Robin Uthappa	India	₹3 crore (US$310,000)
Jaydev Unadkat	India	₹3 crore (US$310,000)
Rahul Tewatia	India	₹3 crore (US$310,000)
Yashasvi Jaiswal	India	₹2.4 crore (US$250,000)
Mayank Markande	India	₹2 crore (US$210,000)
Kartik Tyagi	India	₹1.3 crore (US$130,000)
Andrew Tye	Australia	₹1 crore (US$100,000)
Anuj Rawat	India	₹80 lakh (US$83,000)
David Miller	South Africa	₹75 lakh (US$78,000)
Mahipal Lomror	India	₹20 lakh (US$21,000)
Manan Vohra	India	₹20 lakh (US$21,000)
Riyan Parag	India	₹20 lakh (US$21,000)
Shreyas Gopal	India	₹20 lakh (US$21,000)
Royal Challengers Bangalore
Virat Kohli	India	₹17 crore (US$1.8 million)
AB de Villiers	South Africa	₹11 crore (US$1.1 million)
Yuzvendra Chahal	India	₹6 crore (US$620,000)
Kane Richardson	Australia	₹4 crore (US$420,000)
Washington Sundar	India	₹3.2 crore (US$330,000)
Navdeep Saini	India	₹3 crore (US$310,000)
Mohammed Siraj	India	₹2.6 crore (US$270,000)
Adam Zampa ^{REP}	Australia	₹1.5 crore (US$160,000)
Josh Philippe	Australia	₹20 lakh (US$21,000)
Devdutt Padikkal	India	₹20 lakh (US$21,000)
Pavan Deshpande	India	₹20 lakh (US$21,000)
Shahbaz Ahmed	India	₹20 lakh (US$21,000)
Sunrisers Hyderabad
David Warner	Australia	₹12 crore (US$1.2 million) (Note: Warner was retained at a salary of ₹12 crore (US$1.2 million) but as per IPL rules, the actual purse deduction for the Hyderabad team was ₹12.5 crore (US$1.3 million).)
Manish Pandey	India	₹11 crore (US$1.1 million)
Rashid Khan	Afghanistan	₹9 crore (US$930,000)
Bhuvneshwar Kumar	India	₹8.5 crore (US$880,000)
Siddarth Kaul	India	₹3.8 crore (US$390,000)
Shahbaz Nadeem	India	₹3.2 crore (US$330,000)
Vijay Shankar	India	₹3.2 crore (US$330,000)
Kane Williamson	New Zealand	₹3 crore (US$310,000)
Khaleel Ahmed	India	₹3 crore (US$310,000)
Sandeep Sharma	India	₹3 crore (US$310,000)
Jonny Bairstow	England	₹2.2 crore (US$230,000)
Mitchell Marsh	Australia	₹2 crore (US$210,000)
Priyam Garg	India	₹1.9 crore (US$200,000)
Virat Singh	India	₹1.9 crore (US$200,000)
Wriddhiman Saha	India	₹1.2 crore (US$120,000)
Mohammad Nabi	Afghanistan	₹1 crore (US$100,000)
Shreevats Goswami	India	₹1 crore (US$100,000)
Basil Thampi	India	₹95 lakh (US$99,000)
Jason Holder ^{REP}	Barbados	₹75 lakh (US$78,000)
Abhishek Sharma	India	₹55 lakh (US$57,000)
Thangarasu Natarajan	India	₹40 lakh (US$42,000)
Abdul Samad	India	₹20 lakh (US$21,000)

^{REP} REP: Players who were unsold originally in the 2020 auction but were later signed up as a replacement player.

=== Summary ===
Pre-Auction summary
Team	Retained		Transfers In		Released		Transfers Out		Funds Remaining	Player Slots Remaining (Max)	
Team	Players	Amount	Players	Amount	Players	Amount	Players	Amount	Funds Remaining	Overall	Overseas
Chennai	21	₹62.10 crore (US$6.4 million)	1	₹3 crore (US$311,527.50)	6	₹22.75 crore (US$2.4 million)	0	—	₹22.90 crore (US$2.4 million)	6	1
Delhi	17	₹72.09 crore (US$7.5 million)	0	—	6	₹5.3 crore (US$550,365.30)	2	₹40 lakh (US$41,537.00)	₹12.90 crore (US$1.3 million)	8	3
Kolkata	17	₹74.25 crore (US$7.7 million)	0	—	6	₹2.55 crore (US$264,798.40)	0	—	₹10.75 crore (US$1.1 million)	8	2
Mumbai	18	₹69.65 crore (US$7.2 million)	0	—	7	₹14.4 crore (US$1.5 million)	0	—	₹15.35 crore (US$1.6 million)	7	4
Punjab	16	₹31.80 crore (US$3.3 million)	0	—	9	₹36.7 crore (US$3.8 million)	0	—	₹53.20 crore (US$5.5 million)	9	5
Rajasthan	16	₹50.15 crore (US$5.2 million)	0	—	8	₹20.1 crore (US$2.1 million)	1	₹3 crore (US$311,527.50)	₹34.85 crore (US$3.6 million)	9	3
Bangalore	14	₹49.10 crore (US$5.1 million)	2	₹40 lakh (US$41,537.00)	10	₹31 crore (US$3.2 million)	0	—	₹35.90 crore (US$3.7 million)	11	3
Hyderabad	22	₹74.25 crore (US$7.7 million)	0	—	5	₹1.6 crore (US$166,148.00)	0	—	₹10.75 crore (US$1.1 million)	3	1
Maximum overseas players: 8; Squad size- Min:18 and Max:25; Budget:₹85 Crore

== Auction ==
The auction was conducted on 18 February 2021 in Chennai. A total of 1097 players initially registered for the auction of which 292 were selected for the auction, including 125 overseas players and three players from associate nations.

=== Sold players ===
S.No	Set No	Set	Name	Country	Playing Role	IPL Matches	Capped / Uncapped / Associate	Base Price (in ₹ Lacs)	IPL 2021 Team	Auctioned Price (in ₹ Lacs)	IPL 2020 Team	IPL Team(s)
1	1	BA1	Steve Smith	Australia	Batsman	95	Capped	200	Delhi Capitals	220	RR	RCB, PWI, RPS & RR
2	2	AL1	Glenn Maxwell	Australia	All Rounder	82	Capped	200	Royal Challengers Bangalore	1425	PBKS	MI, PBKS & DC
3	2	AL1	Shakib Al Hasan	Bangladesh	All Rounder	63	Capped	200	Kolkata Knight Riders	320		KKR & SRH
4	2	AL1	Moeen Ali	England	All Rounder	19	Capped	200	Chennai Super Kings	700	RCB	RCB
5	2	AL1	Shivam Dube	India	All Rounder	15	Capped	50	Rajasthan Royals	440	RCB	RCB
6	2	AL1	Chris Morris	South Africa	All Rounder	70	Capped	75	Rajasthan Royals	1625	RCB	CSK, RR, DC & RCB
7	2	AL1	Dawid Malan	England	All Rounder		Capped	150	Punjab Kings	150		
8	4	FA1	Adam Milne	New Zealand	Fast Bowler	5	Capped	50	Mumbai Indians	320		RCB, MI
9	4	FA1	Mustafizur Rahman	Bangladesh	Fast Bowler	24	Capped	100	Rajasthan Royals	100		MI & SRH
10	4	FA1	Jhye Richardson	Australia	Fast Bowler		capped	150	Punjab Kings	1400		
11	4	FA1	Nathan Coulter-Nile	Australia	Fast Bowler	33	Capped	150	Mumbai Indians	500	MI	MI, DC, KKR & RCB
12	4	FA1	Umesh Yadav	India	Fast Bowler	121	Capped	100	Delhi Capitals	100	RCB	DC, KKR & RCB
13	5	SP1	Piyush Chawla	India	Spinner	164	Capped	50	Mumbai Indians	240	CSK	PBKS, KKR & CSK
14	6	UBA1	Sachin Baby	India	Batsman	18	Uncapped	20	Royal Challengers Bangalore	20		RR, RCB, SRH
15	6	UBA1	Rajat Patidar	India	Batsman		Uncapped	20	Royal Challengers Bangalore	20		
16	7	UAL1	Ripal Patel	India	All Rounder		Uncapped	20	Delhi Capitals	20		
17	7	UAL1	Shahrukh Khan	India	All Rounder		Uncapped	20	Punjab Kings	525		
18	7	UAL1	Krishnappa Gowtham	India	All Rounder	24	Uncapped	20	Chennai Super Kings	925	PBKS	MI, RR, PBKS
19	8	UWK1	Vishnu Vinod	India	Wicket Keeper	3	Uncapped	20	Delhi Capitals	20		RCB
20	8	UWK1	Sheldon Jackson	India	Wicket Keeper	4	Uncapped	20	Kolkata Knight Riders	20		KKR & RCB
21	8	UWK1	Mohammed Azharuddeen	India	Wicket Keeper		Uncapped	20	Royal Challengers Bangalore	20		
22	9	UFA1	Lukman Hussain Meriwala	India	Fast Bowler		Uncapped	20	Delhi Capitals	20		
23	9	UFA1	Chetan Sakariya	India	Fast Bowler		Uncapped	20	Rajasthan Royals	120		
24	9	UFA1	Riley Meredith	Australia	Fast bowler		Uncapped	40	Punjab Kings	800		
25	10	USP1	Manimaran Siddharth	India	Spinner		Uncapped	20	Delhi Capitals	20	KKR	KKR
26	10	USP1	Jagadeesha Suchith	India	Spinner	15	Uncapped	20	Sunrisers Hyderabad	30	PBKS	MI, PBKS & DC
27	10	USP1	K. C. Cariappa	India	Spinner	11	Uncapped	20	Rajasthan Royals	20		KKR & PBKS
28	11	BA2	Cheteshwar Pujara	India	Batsman	30	Capped	50	Chennai Super Kings	50		KKR, RCB & PBKS
29	12	AL2	Kyle Jamieson	New Zealand	All Rounder		Capped	75	Royal Challengers Bangalore	1500		
30	12	AL2	Tom Curran	England	All Rounder	10	Capped	150	Delhi Capitals	525	RR	KKR & RR
31	12	AL2	Moises Henriques	Australia	All Rounder	57	Capped	100	Punjab Kings	420		KKR, DC, MI, PBKS, RCB & SRH
32	14	UAL2	Jalaj Saxena	India	All Rounder		Uncapped	20	Punjab Kings	30		MI, RCB & DC
33	14	UAL2	Utkarsh Singh	India	All Rounder		Uncapped	20	Punjab Kings	20		
34	14	UAL2	Vaibhav Arora	India	All Rounder		Uncapped	20	Kolkata Knight Riders	20		
35	14	UAL2	Fabian Allen	Jamaica	All Rounder		Capped	75	Punjab Kings	75	SRH	SRH
36	14	UAL2	Dan Christian	Australia	All Rounder	40	Capped	75	Royal Challengers Bangalore	480		DCH, RCB, RPS & DC
37	14	UAL2	Liam Livingstone	England	All Rounder	4	Capped	75	Rajasthan Royals	75		RR
38	14	UAL2	Suyash Prabhudessai	India	All Rounder		Uncapped	20	Royal Challengers Bangalore	20		
39	14	UWK2	Kona Srikar Bharat	India	Wicket Keeper		Uncapped	20	Royal Challengers Bangalore	20		DC
40	14	UAL2	Harishankar Reddy	India	All Rounder		Uncapped	20	Chennai Super Kings	20		
41	14	UAL2	Kuldip Yadav	India	All Rounder		Uncapped	20	Rajasthan Royals	20		
42	14	UAL2	James Neesham	New Zealand	All Rounder		Capped	50	Mumbai Indians	50	PBKS	KKR, DC & PBKS
43	14	UAL2	Yudhvir Charak	India	All Rounder		Uncapped	20	Mumbai Indians	20		
44	14	UAL2	Bhagath Varma	India	All Rounder		Uncapped	20	Chennai Super Kings	20		
45	14	UAL2	Marco Jansen	South Africa	All Rounder		Uncapped	20	Mumbai Indians	20		
46	14	UAL2	Saurabh Kumar	India	All Rounder		Uncapped	20	Punjab Kings	20		RPS
47	14	UBA2	Karun Nair	India	Batsman	73	Capped	50	Kolkata Knight Riders	50	PBKS	RCB, RR, DC & PBKS
48	14	AL2	Kedar Jadhav	India	All Rounder	87	Capped	200	Sunrisers Hyderabad	200	CSK	DC, KTK, RCB & CSK
49	14	WK2	Sam Billings	England	Wicket Keeper	22	Capped	200	Delhi Capitals	200		DC & CSK
50	14	USP2	Mujeeb Ur Rahman	Afghanistan	Spinner	18	Capped	150	Sunrisers Hyderabad	150	PBKS	PBKS
51	14	SP2	Harbhajan Singh	India	Spinner	160	Capped	200	Kolkata Knight Riders	200	CSK	MI, CSK
52	14	UBA2	Chezhian Harinishanth	India	Batsman		Uncapped	20	Chennai Super Kings	20		
53	14	AL2	Ben Cutting	Australia	All Rounder	21	Capped	75	Kolkata Knight Riders	75		PBKS, RR, SRH & MI
54	14	UAL2	Venkatesh Iyer	India	All Rounder		Uncapped	20	Kolkata Knight Riders	20		
55	14	UAL2	Pawan Negi	India	All Rounder	50	Capped	50	Kolkata Knight Riders	50	RCB	DC, CSK & RCB
56	14	UFA2	Akash Singh	India	Fast Bowler		Uncapped	20	Rajasthan Royals	20	RR	RR
57	14	UAL2	Arjun Tendulkar	India	All Rounder		Uncapped	20	Mumbai Indians	20		

13 4 pranav wicket keeper all rounder

uncapped 40 Mumbai Indians 40

== Withdrawn players ==
The following players withdrew from the tournament either due to injuries or because of other reasons.

- **Bold** – Players returned for UAE leg. Players listed as their replacements were put into the available players pool.

Player	Team	Auctioned/Retention Price	Reason	Withdrawal Announcement date	Replacement Player	Replacement Player's Price	Replacement Player's Base Price	Signing date	Ref
Josh Philippe	Royal Challengers Bangalore	₹20 lakh (US$20,768.50)	Personal Reasons	10 March 2021	Finn Allen	₹20 lakh (US$20,768.50)	₹20 lakh (US$20,768.50)	10 March 2021	
**Shreyas Iyer**	Delhi Capitals	₹7 crore (US$726,897.50)	Shoulder injury	30 March 2021	Aniruddha Joshi	₹20 lakh (US$20,768.50)	₹20 lakh (US$20,768.50)	15 April 2021	
**Axar Patel**	Delhi Capitals	₹5 crore (US$660,000)	Ruled out for a short term due to covid positive	15 April 2021	Shams Mulani	₹20 lakh (US$20,768.50)	₹20 lakh (US$20,768.50)	15 April 2021	
Mitchell Marsh	Sunrisers Hyderabad	₹2 crore (US$210,000)	Personal Reasons	31 March 2021	Jason Roy	₹2 crore (US$207,685.00)	₹2 crore (US$207,685.00)	31 March 2021	
**Josh Hazlewood**	Chennai Super Kings	₹2 crore (US$210,000)	Personal Reasons	1 April 2021	Jason Behrendorff	₹1 crore (US$103,842.50)	₹1 crore (US$103,842.50)	9 April 2021	
**Rinku Singh**	Kolkata Knight Riders	₹80 lakh (US$83,074.00)	Knee Injury	3 April 2021	Gurkeerat Singh	₹50 lakh (US$51,921.30)	₹50 lakh (US$51,921.30)	3 April 2021	
Ben Stokes	Rajasthan Royals	₹12.5 crore (US$1.3 million)	Finger Injury	13 April 2021	Oshane Thomas		₹50 lakh (US$51,921.30)	31 August 2021	
**Liam Livingstone**	Rajasthan Royals	₹75 lakh (US$77,881.90)	Personal Reasons	20 April 2021	Gerald Coetzee	₹20 lakh (US$20,768.50)	₹20 lakh (US$20,768.50)	1 May 2021	
**T. Natarajan**	Sunrisers Hyderabad	₹40 lakh (US$41,537.00)	Knee Injury	22 April 2021	Umran Malik (Note: Umran Malik named as short term COVID-19 replacement for T. Natarajan.)		₹20 lakh (US$20,768.50)	24 September 2021	
Jofra Archer	Rajasthan Royals	₹7.2 crore (US$747,666.00)	Elbow/Finger Injury	23 April 2021	Glenn Phillips		₹50 lakh (US$52,000)	21 August 2021	
Andrew Tye	Rajasthan Royals	₹1 crore (US$103,842.50)	Personal Reasons	25 April 2021	Tabraiz Shamsi			25 August 2021	
Kane Richardson	Royal Challengers Bangalore	₹4 crore (US$415,370.00)	Personal Reasons	26 April 2021	Scott Kuggeleijn		₹50 lakh (US$66,000)	27 April 2021	
Kane Richardson	Royal Challengers Bangalore	₹4 crore (US$415,370.00)	Personal Reasons	26 April 2021	George Garton		₹20 lakh (US$21,000)	25 August 2021	
Adam Zampa	Royal Challengers Bangalore	₹1.5 crore (US$155,763.80)	Personal Reasons	26 April 2021	Wanindu Hasaranga		₹50 lakh (US$52,000)	21 August 2021	
Jhye Richardson	Punjab Kings	₹14 crore (US$1.5 million)	Personal Reasons	20 August 2021	Adil Rashid		₹1.5 crore (US$155,763.80)	26 August 2021	
Riley Meredith	Punjab Kings	₹8 crore (US$830,740.00)	Personal Reasons	20 August 2021	Nathan Ellis		₹20 lakh (US$21,000)	20 August 2021	
Daniel Sams	Royal Challengers Bangalore	₹20 lakh (US$21,000)	Personal Reasons	21 August 2021	Dushmantha Chameera		₹50 lakh (US$52,000)	21 August 2021	
Finn Allen	Royal Challengers Bangalore	₹20 lakh (US$21,000)	International duty	21 August 2021	Tim David		₹20 lakh (US$21,000)	21 August 2021	
Jos Buttler	Rajasthan Royals	₹4.4 crore (US$456,907.00)	Personal Reasons	21 August 2021	Evin Lewis		₹1 crore (US$103,842.50)	31 August 2021	
Pat Cummins	Kolkata Knight Riders	₹15.5 crore (US$1.6 million)	Personal Reasons	22 August 2021	Tim Southee		₹75 lakh (US$77,881.90)	26 August 2021	
Washington Sundar	Royal Challengers Bangalore	₹3.2 crore (US$332,296.00)	Finger Injury	30 August 2021	Akash Deep		₹20 lakh (US$20,768.50)	30 August 2021	
Dawid Malan	Punjab Kings	₹1.5 crore (US$155,763.80)	Personal Reasons	11 September 2021	Aiden Markram			11 September 2021	
Jonny Bairstow	Sunrisers Hyderabad	₹2.2 crore (US$228,453.50)	Personal Reasons	11 September 2021	Sherfane Rutherford		₹75 lakh (US$77,881.90)	11 September 2021	
Chris Woakes	Delhi Capitals	₹1.5 crore (US$155,763.80)	Personal Reasons	11 September 2021	Ben Dwarshuis		₹30 lakh (US$31,152.80)	13 September 2021	
Manimaran Siddharth	Delhi Capitals	₹20 lakh (US$20,768.50)	Quadriceps Strain	15 September 2021	Kulwant Khejroliya		₹20 lakh (US$21,000)	15 September 2021	
Sherfane Rutherford	Sunrisers Hyderabad	₹75 lakh (US$77,881.90)	Personal Reasons	23 September 2021					
Kuldeep Yadav	Kolkata Knight Riders	₹5.8 crore (US$602,286.50)	Knee Injury	27 September 2021					
Arjun Tendulkar	Mumbai Indians	₹20 lakh (US$20,768.50)	Injury	29 September 2021	Simarjeet Singh			29 September 2021	
Chris Gayle	Punjab Kings	₹2 crore (US$207,685.00)	Bio-Bubble Fatigue	30 September 2021					
Sam Curran	Chennai Super Kings	₹5.5 crore (US$571,133.80)	Lower-Back issue	5 October 2021	Dominic Drakes			6 October 2021	

== Support staff changes ==
Staff	Team	Change	Role	Announcement date	Ref
Parthiv Patel	Mumbai Indians	Appointed	Talent scout	10 December 2020	
Tom Moody	Sunrisers Hyderabad	Appointed	Director of cricket	15 December 2020	
Pravin Amre	Delhi Capitals	Appointed	Assistant coach	6 January 2021	
Kumar Sangakkara	Rajasthan Royals	Appointed	Director of cricket	24 January 2021	
Sanjay Bangar	Royal Challengers Bangalore	Appointed	Batting consultant	10 February 2021	
Andrew McDonald	Rajasthan Royals	Resigned	Head coach	21 February 2021	
Trevor Penney	Rajasthan Royals	Appointed	Assistant coach	21 February 2021	
Ish Sodhi	Rajasthan Royals	Appointed	Team Liaison Officer	26 February 2021	
Sundar Raman	Chennai Super Kings	Appointed	Consultant	7 March 2021	
Damien Wright	Punjab Kings	Appointed	Bowling coach	13 March 2021	
Vinay Kumar	Mumbai Indians	Appointed	Talent scout	28 July 2021	
Mike Hesson	Royal Challengers Bangalore	In-charge	Head coach	21 August 2021	
