= Mahesh Rawat =

Indian cricketer (born 1985)

Personal information
- Born: 25 October 1985 (age 41); Faridabad, Haryana, India
- Batting: Right-handed
- Role: Wicket-keeper

Domestic team information
- Years: Team
- 2003/04–2006/07: Haryana
- 2007/08–2019/20: Railways
- 2008–2009: Rajasthan Royals
- 2013: Pune Warriors India

Career statistics
Competition	FC	LA	T20
Matches	115	67	62
Runs scored	5,941	1,533	1,153
Batting average	37.84	28.38	33.91
100s/50s	14/37	1/9	0/9
Top score	188	108	72*
Balls bowled	240	126	–
Wickets	6	5	–
Bowling average	17.16	18.00	–
5 wickets in innings	0	0	–
10 wickets in match	0	0	–
Best bowling	2/5	2/9	–
Catches/stumpings	304/40	78/19	46/15
- Source: ESPNcricinfo, 20 April 2022

Mahesh Rawat (born 25 October 1985) is an Indian cricketer who is also the captain of Indian Railways cricket team. He played with Rajasthan Royals and was part of the Pune Warriors India team in the Indian Premier League.

He was the leading run-scorer for Railways in the 2018–19 Ranji Trophy, with 478 runs in seven matches.
