= Omkar Verma =

Indian cricketer (born 1991)

Personal information
- Born: 23 October 1991 (age 35)
- Source: ESPNcricinfo, 3 March 2017

Omkar Verma (born 23 October 1991) is an Indian cricketer. He made his List A debut for Chhattisgarh in the 2016–17 Vijay Hazare Trophy on 3 March 2017. He made his first-class debut for Chhattisgarh in the 2018–19 Ranji Trophy on 1 November 2018.
