= Mohmad Ajrudeen =

Indian cricketer

Personal information
- Full name: Mohmad Ajrudeen
- Source: ESPNcricinfo, 30 September 2018

Mohmad Ajrudeen is an Indian cricketer. He made his List A debut for Himachal Pradesh in the 2018–19 Vijay Hazare Trophy on 30 September 2018.
