= Siddhesh Warghante =

Indian cricketer (born 1998)

Personal information
- Born: 22 December 1998 (age 27)
- Source: Cricinfo, 7 January 2019

Siddhesh Warghante (born 22 December 1998) is an Indian cricketer. He made his first-class debut for Maharashtra in the 2018–19 Ranji Trophy on 7 January 2019.
