= Karan Sharma (cricketer, born 1996) =

Indian cricketer (born 1996)

Personal information
- Born: 2 November 1996 (age 30)
- Source: ESPNcricinfo, 20 September 2018

Karan Sharma (born 2 November 1996) is an Indian cricketer. He made his List A debut for Railways on 20 September, 2018 in the 2018–19 Vijay Hazare Trophy.
