= Kaunain Abbas =

Indian cricketer (born 1990)

Personal information
- Full name: Mir Kaunain Abbas
- Born: 7 May 1990 (age 36); Bangalore, India

Career statistics
Competition	FC
Matches	11
Runs scored	541
Batting average	36.06
100s/50s	0/6
Top score	74
Balls bowled	-
Wickets	-
Bowling average	-
5 wickets in innings	-
10 wickets in match	-
Best bowling	-
Catches/stumpings	11/–
- Source: ESPNcricinfo, 13 October 2016

Kaunain Abbas (born 7 May 1990) is an Indian cricketer. He made his first-class debut for Karnataka in the 2016–17 Ranji Trophy on 13 October 2016. He made his List A debut for Karnataka in the 2018–19 Vijay Hazare Trophy on 30 September 2018.

Abbas also played for the Belagavi Panthers and Namma Shivamogga.
