= KD Singh (cricketer) =

Indian cricketer (born 1981)

Personal information
- Born: 27 May 1981 (age 45)
- Source: ESPNcricinfo, 20 September 2018

KD Singh (born 27 May 1981) is an Indian cricketer. He made his List A debut for Himachal Pradesh in the 2018–19 Vijay Hazare Trophy on 20 September 2018.
