= Mandar Bhandari =

Indian cricketer (born 1994)

Personal information
- Born: 15 June 1994 (age 32); Narayangaon, Maharashtra, India
- Batting: Right-handed
- Role: Wicket-keeper

Domestic team information
- Years: Team
- 2018–: Maharashtra
- Source: ESPNcricinfo, 1 October 2019

Mandar Bhandari (born 15 June 1994) is an Indian cricketer who plays for Maharashtra. He made his List-A debut for Maharashtra against Goa in the 2018-19 Vijay Hazare Trophy on 19 September 2018. He made his first-class debut for Maharashtra in the 2018–19 Ranji Trophy on 22 December 2018.
