= Sahim Hasan =

Indian cricketer (born 1996)

Personal information
- Full name: Sahim Hasan
- Born: 3 December 1996 (age 29)
- Source: Cricinfo, 22 December 2018

Sahim Hasan (born 3 December 1996) is an Indian cricketer. He made his first-class debut for Railways in the 2018–19 Ranji Trophy on 22 December 2018.
