= Sivasubramaniyan Shankar =

Indian cricketer and umpire (born 1971)

Personal information
- Born: 13 February 1971 (age 55); Mattancherry, India

Umpiring information
- WODIs umpired: 1 (2018)
- WT20Is umpired: 5 (2013–2015)
- Source: Cricinfo, 30 October 2015

Sivasubramaniyan Shankar (born 13 February 1971) is an Indian former first-class cricketer. He is now an umpire and has stood in matches in the 2015–16 Ranji Trophy.
