= Suniket Bingewar =

Indian cricketer (born 1993)

Personal information
- Born: 21 November 1993 (age 32); Wardha, Maharashtra
- Batting: Right handed
- Bowling: Right arm medium

Domestic team information
- Years: Team
- 2018–19: Vidarbha
- Source: Cricinfo, 7 January 2019

Suniket Bingewar (born 21 November 1993) is an Indian cricketer. He made his first-class debut for Vidarbha in the 2018–19 Ranji Trophy on 7 January 2019.
