= Vishal Kushwah =

Indian cricketer (born 1990)

Personal information
- Born: 30 November 1990 (age 35); Raipur, India
- Source: ESPNcricinfo, 27 October 2016

Vishal Kushwah (born 30 November 1990) is an Indian cricketer. He made his first-class debut for Chhattisgarh in the 2016–17 Ranji Trophy on 27 October 2016. He made his Twenty20 debut for Chhattisgarh in the 2016–17 Inter State Twenty-20 Tournament on 29 January 2017. He made his List A debut for Chhattisgarh in the 2017–18 Vijay Hazare Trophy on 5 February 2018.
