= Sanjeet Desai =

Indian cricketer (born 1997)

Personal information
- Born: 12 December 1997 (age 28)
- Batting: Right-handed
- Bowling: Leg spin
- Source: Cricinfo, 12 February 2018

Sanjeet Desai (born 12 December 1997) is an Indian cricketer. He made his List A debut for Chhattisgarh in the 2017–18 Vijay Hazare Trophy on 12 February 2018. He made his first-class debut for Chhattisgarh in the 2018–19 Ranji Trophy on 1 November 2018. He made his Twenty20 debut for Chhattisgarh on 5 November 2021, in the 2021–22 Syed Mushtaq Ali Trophy.

He set a record in Indian domestic cricket by scoring four consecutive hundreds in ck nayudu trophy 2022/23.
