= South Coast Railway Stadium =

Stadium in Visakhapatnam, India

- SCOR Stadium
- Interactive map of South Coast Railway Stadium
- Full name: South Coast Railway Stadium
- Former names: SERA Stadium , ECoR Stadium
- Location: Visakhapatnam, Andhra Pradesh
- Coordinates: 22.9356°N 88.4518°E
- Owner: South Coast Railway
- Operator: South Coast Railway
- Capacity: n/a

Construction
- Groundbreaking: 1964
- Opened: 1964
- Renovated: 2018

Website
- Cricinfo

South Coast Railway Stadium is a multi purpose stadium in Visakhapatnam, Andhra Pradesh. The ground is mainly used for organizing matches of football, cricket and other sports. The stadium has hosted a first-class matches in 1964 when Andhra cricket team played against Hyderabad cricket team. The ground has held seven further first-class matches, the last of which came in the 1997/98 Ranji Trophy when Andhra cricket team and the Goa cricket team.

The ground has also hosted six List A matches from 1997 to 2002; since then stadium has hosted non-first-class matches.
