= Gneshwar Naveen =

Indian cricketer (born 1994)

Personal information
- Full name: M Gneshwar Naveen
- Born: 24 May 1994 (age 32); Mandya, Karnataka, India
- Batting: Right-handed
- Bowling: Right arm medium
- Source: ESPNcricinfo, 26 September 2018

Gneshwar Naveen (born 24 May 1994) is an Indian cricketer. He made his List A debut for Karnataka in the 2018–19 Vijay Hazare Trophy on 26 September 2018.
