= Shubham Kumar Singh =

Indian cricketer (born 1998)

Shubham Singh
Personal information
- Full name: Shubham Kumar Singh
- Born: 6 December 1998 (age 27); Deoghar, Jharkhand, India
- Nickname: Shubh
- Batting: Right-handed
- Bowling: Right-arm medium-fast
- Role: Bowler

Domestic team information
- Years: Team
- 2017: Jharkhand U-19
- 2018 – present: Jharkhand

Career statistics
Competition	List A
Matches	2
Runs scored	4
Batting average	2
100s/50s	0/0
Top score	4
Balls bowled	120
Wickets	0
Bowling average	-
5 wickets in innings	0
10 wickets in match	0
Best bowling	0/51
Catches/stumpings	2/-

Shubham Kumar Singh (born 6 December 1998) is an Indian cricketer who is a bowler for Jharkhand. He made his Twenty20 debut on 6 November 2021 for Jharkhand in the 2021–22 Syed Mushtaq Ali Trophy.
