= Jay Pande =

Indian cricketer (born 1994)

Personal information
- Full name: Jay Shilpa Pande
- Born: 20 September 1994 (age 32); Pune, Maharashtra, India
- Batting: Right-handed
- Bowling: Right-arm offbreak

Domestic team information
- Years: Team
- 2018–2020: Maharashtra
- 2021–2022: Chilaw Marians
- 2022–present: Puducherry
- Source: ESPNcricinfo, 19 September 2018

Jay Pande (20 September 1994) is an Indian cricketer who plays for Puducherry. He made his List A debut for Maharashtra against Goa in the 2018-19 Vijay Hazare Trophy on 19 September 2018. He made his first-class debut for Maharashtra in the 2018–19 Ranji Trophy on 28 November 2018.

In October and November 2021, he played for Chilaw Marians Cricket Club in the 2021–22 Major Clubs Limited Over Tournament in Sri Lanka.
