= Vivekanand Tiwari =

Indian cricketer (born 1998)

Personal information
- Born: 5 October 1998 (age 28); Ranchi, Jharkhand, India
- Batting: Right-handed
- Bowling: Right arm medium
- Source: Cricinfo, 2 October 2019

Vivekanand Tiwari (born 5 October 1998) is an Indian cricketer. He made his List A debut on 2 October 2019, for Jharkhand in the 2019–20 Vijay Hazare Trophy. He made his Twenty20 debut on 12 November 2019, for Jharkhand in the 2019–20 Syed Mushtaq Ali Trophy. He made his first-class debut on 9 December 2019, for Jharkhand in the 2019–20 Ranji Trophy.
