= Vikrant Rajput =

Indian cricketer (born 1992)

Personal information
- Born: 25 October 1992 (age 34); Durg, Madhya Pradesh
- Batting: Left-handed
- Bowling: Slow left arm orthodox

Domestic team information
- Years: Team
- 2018/19: Chhattisgarh
- Source: Cricinfo, 6 December 2018

Vikrant Rajput (born 25 October 1992) is an Indian cricketer. He made his first-class debut for Chhattisgarh in the 2018–19 Ranji Trophy on 6 December 2018. He made his List A debut on 25 September 2019, for Railways in the 2019–20 Vijay Hazare Trophy. He made his Twenty20 debut on 11 November 2019, for Railways in the 2019–20 Syed Mushtaq Ali Trophy.
