= Krishnamurthy Siddharth =

Indian cricketer (born 1992)

Personal information
- Full name: Krishnamurthy Venkatesh Siddharth
- Born: 22 November 1992 (age 33); Bangalore, Karnataka, India
- Batting: Right-handed
- Bowling: Right arm medium
- Role: Wicketkeeper

Domestic team information
- Years: Team
- 2018–22: Karnataka
- 2023–: Goa
- Source: ESPNcricinfo, 12 November 2018

Krishnamurthy Siddharth (born 22 November 1992) is an Indian cricketer. He made his first-class debut for Karnataka in the 2018–19 Ranji Trophy on 12 November 2018. He was the leading run-scorer for Karnataka in the 2018–19 Ranji Trophy, with 728 runs. He made his Twenty20 debut for Karnataka in the 2018–19 Syed Mushtaq Ali Trophy on 21 February 2019. He made his List A debut on 26 September 2019, for Karnataka in the 2019–20 Vijay Hazare Trophy. He was also part of the Syed Mushtaq Ali and Vijay Hazare winning team. He was the highest scorer for Karnataka with 410 runs in four matches in the 2021–22 Ranji Trophy.
