= Lavin Coster =

Indian cricketer (born 1992)

Personal information
- Born: 13 December 1992 (age 33)
- Source: ESPNcricinfo, 7 January 2019

Lavin Coster (born 13 December 1992) is an Indian cricketer. He made his first-class debut for Chhattisgarh in the 2018–19 Ranji Trophy on 7 January 2019. He made his Twenty20 debut for Chhattisgarh in the 2018–19 Syed Mushtaq Ali Trophy on 21 February 2019. He made his List A debut on 8 October 2019, for Chhattisgarh in the 2019–20 Vijay Hazare Trophy.
