= Manish Rao =

Indian cricketer (born 1990)

Personal information
- Born: 19 July 1990 (age 36); Mumbai, India
- Source: ESPNcricinfo, 31 January 2017

Manish Rao (born 19 July 1990) is an Indian cricketer. He made his Twenty20 debut for Mumbai in the 2016–17 Inter State Twenty-20 Tournament on 31 January 2017. He made his first-class debut for Railways in the 2017–18 Ranji Trophy on 1 November 2017. He made his List A debut for Railways in the 2018–19 Vijay Hazare Trophy on 26 September 2018.
