= Manjeet Singh (cricketer) =

Indian cricketer (born 1991)

Personal information
- Born: 1 November 1991 (age 35); Alwar, Rajasthan, India
- Source: ESPNcricinfo, 6 October 2015

Manjeet Singh (born 1 November 1991) is an Indian first-class cricketer who plays for Railways.
