= Dhrumil Matkar =

Indian cricketer (born 1996)

Personal information
- Born: 3 June 1996 (age 30); Mumbai, Maharashtra, India
- Source: ESPNcricinfo, 5 February 2018

Dhrumil Matkar (born 3 June 1996) is an Indian cricketer. He made his List A debut for Mumbai in the 2017–18 Vijay Hazare Trophy on 5 February 2018. He made his first-class debut for Mumbai in the 2018–19 Ranji Trophy on 28 November 2018. In December 2018, in Mumbai's match against Vidarbha, he took his maiden five-wicket haul in first-class cricket.
