= Harsh Tyagi =

Indian cricketer (born 1999)

Personal information
- Born: 23 December 1999 (age 26); Delhi, India
- Batting: Left-handed
- Bowling: Slow left arm orthodox
- Source: ESPNcricinfo, 20 September 2018

Harsh Tyagi (born 23 December 1999) is an Indian cricketer. He made his List A debut for Railways in the 2018–19 Vijay Hazare Trophy on 20 September 2018. In October 2018, in the final of the 2018 ACC Under-19 Asia Cup, he took six wickets for 38 runs from his ten overs, and was named the man of the match. He made his Twenty20 debut for Railways in the 2018–19 Syed Mushtaq Ali Trophy on 21 February 2019.
