= Lukman Meriwala =

Indian cricketer (born 1991)

Personal information
- Full name: Lukman Iqbal Meriwala
- Born: 11 December 1991 (age 34); Makan, Baroda, India
- Batting: Left-handed
- Bowling: Left-arm fast-medium
- Role: Bowler

Domestic team information
- Years: Team
- 2012–: Baroda
- 2021: Delhi Capitals
- Source: ESPNcricinfo

Lukman Iqbal Meriwala (born 11 December 1991) is an Indian cricketer who plays for Baroda in domestic cricket. He is a left-arm fast-medium bowler who was the leading wicket-taker of the 2013/14 Syed Mushtaq Ali Trophy which Baroda won. In February 2021, Meriwala was bought by the Delhi Capitals in the Indian Premier League auction ahead of the 2021 IPL edition.
