= Vishvaraj Jadeja =

Indian cricketer (born 1998)

Vishvaraj sinh Jadeja
Personal information
- Full name: Vishvaraj Mahendrasinh Jadeja
- Born: 19 July 1998 (age 28); Rajkot, Gujarat, India
- Source: Cricinfo, 8 January 2018

Vishvarajsinh Jadeja (born 19 July 1998) is an Indian cricketer. He made his Twenty20 debut for Saurashtra in the 2017–18 Zonal T20 League on 8 January 2018. He made his first-class debut for Saurashtra in the 2018–19 Ranji Trophy on 14 December 2018. He made his List A debut on 26 September 2019, for Saurashtra in the 2019–20 Vijay Hazare Trophy.
