= Ronit More =

Indian cricketer (born 1992)

Personal information
- Full name: Ronit Gajanan More
- Born: 2 February 1992 (age 34); Belgaum, Karnataka, India
- Batting: Right-handed
- Bowling: Right-arm medium-fast
- Role: Bowler

Domestic team information
- Years: Team
- 2012–present: Karnataka
- 2013: Chennai Super Kings

Career statistics
Competition	FC	LA	T20
Matches	3	7	1
Runs scored	3	29	0
Batting average	0.75	14.50	0.00
100s/50s	0/0	0/0	0/0
Top score	3	12	0
Balls bowled	574	283	24
Wickets	11	15	1
Bowling average	25.27	15.86	24.00
5 wickets in innings	1	0	0
10 wickets in match	0	0	0
Best bowling	5/20	6/18	1/24
Catches/stumpings	0/–	0/–	0/–
- Source: ESPNcricinfo, 10 December 2013

Ronit Gajanan More (born 2 February 1992) is an Indian first-class cricketer who plays for Karnataka. He is a right-arm medium-fast bowler. He has been a member of the Chennai Super Kings squad since 2013 and debuted in the IPL against Kolkata Knight Riders at the Eden Gardens on 30 April 2015.

== Early life ==
Ronit did his schooling from Gomatesh High School, Belgaum and his pre university from Gogte College and now is completing his bachelor's in business from Jain College.

== Career ==
Ronit has also represented Karnataka in the domestic T20 tournament. He was the leading wicket-taker for Karnataka in the group-stage of the 2018–19 Ranji Trophy, with 29 dismissals in six matches.

In August 2019, he was named in the India Red team's squad for the 2019–20 Duleep Trophy.
