= Prithvi Raj (cricketer) =

Indian cricketer (born 1998)

Prithvi Raj Yarra
Personal information
- Born: 20 February 1998 (age 28); Duggirala, Andhra Pradesh, India
- Batting: Left-handed
- Bowling: Left-arm medium
- Role: Bowler

Domestic team information
- Years: Team
- 2017–present: Andhra
- 2019: Kolkata Knight Riders
- 2026: Gujarat Titans

Career statistics
| Competition | FC | LA | T20 |
|---|---|---|---|
| Matches | 6 | 1 | 3 |
| Runs scored | 28 | 0 | 3 |
| Batting average | 9.33 | – | – |
| 100s/50s | 0/0 | – | – |
| Top score | 12 | 0* | 3* |
| Balls bowled | 1,036 | 60 | 53 |
| Wickets | 21 | 2 | 4 |
| Bowling average | 24.38 | 32.50 | 21.25 |
| 5 wickets in innings | 0 | 0 | 0 |
| 10 wickets in match | 0 | 0 | 0 |
| Best bowling | 4/56 | 2/65 | 3/28 |
| Catches/stumpings | 4/– | 1/– | 0/– |
- Source: ESPNcricinfo, 26 April 2019

Prithvi Raj Yarra (born 20 February 1998) is an Indian cricketer who plays for Andhra as a left-arm medium-fast bowler.

== Career ==
Yarra made his first-class debut for Andhra in the 2017–18 Ranji Trophy on 6 October 2017. In July 2018, he was named in the squad for India Red for the 2018–19 Duleep Trophy. He made his List A debut for Andhra in the 2018–19 Vijay Hazare Trophy on 15 October 2018.

In December 2018, he was bought by the Kolkata Knight Riders in the player auction for the 2019 Indian Premier League. He made his Twenty20 debut for Andhra in the 2018–19 Syed Mushtaq Ali Trophy on 28 February 2019. In October 2019, he was named in India B's squad for the 2019–20 Deodhar Trophy. He was released by the Kolkata Knight Riders ahead of the 2020 IPL auction.
