= Vikrant Auti =

Indian cricketer (born 1994)

Personal information
- Born: 7 June 1994 (age 32)
- Batting: Left-handed
- Bowling: Right arm offbreak

Domestic team information
- Years: Team
- 2018–19: Mumbai
- Source: Cricinfo, 14 December 2018

Vikrant Auti (born 7 June 1994) is an Indian cricketer. He made his first-class debut for Mumbai in the 2018–19 Ranji Trophy on 14 December 2018.
