= Three Ovals KSCA Stadium =

Cricket stadium

- KSCA Cricket Ground, Alur
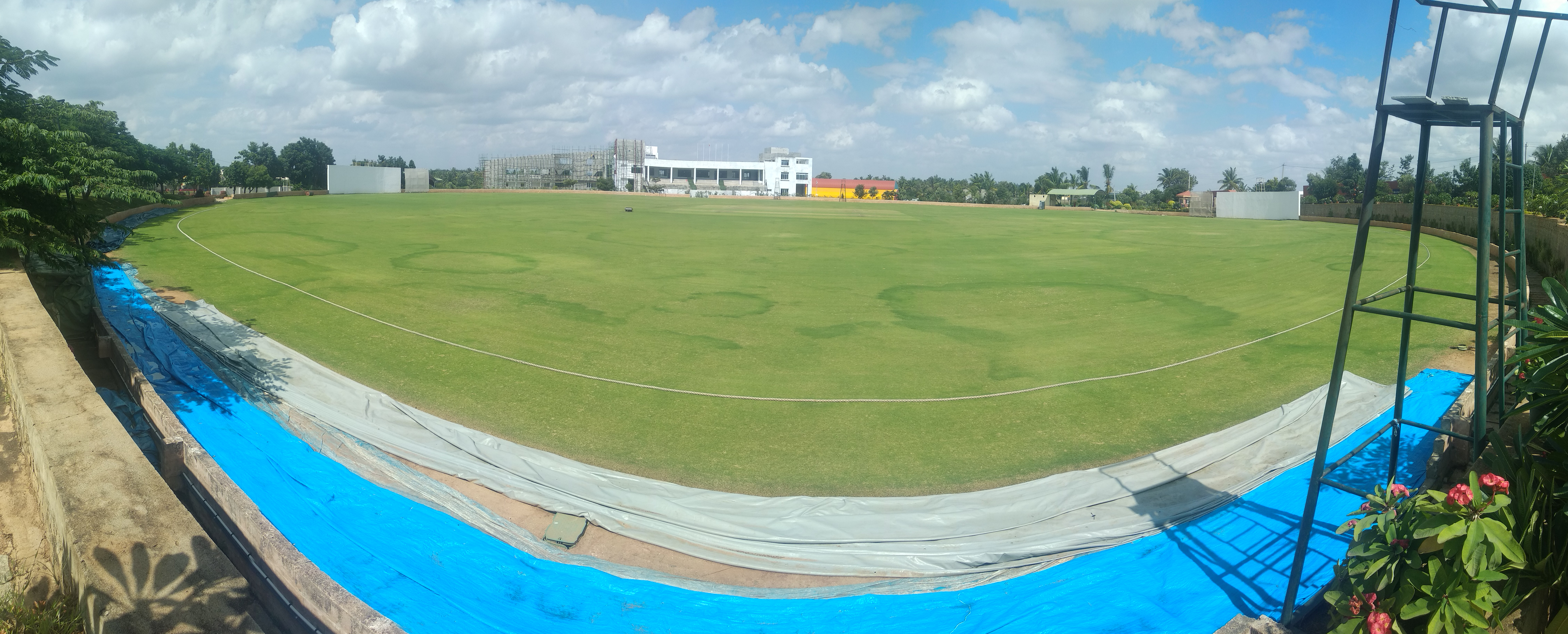
- Platinum Oval at the Three Ovals KSCA Stadium
- Location: Alur, Bangalore, Karnataka, India
- Country: India
- Establishment: 2011
- Owner: Karnataka State Cricket Association

The Three Ovals KSCA Stadium, also known as KSCA Cricket Ground, Alur and Alur Cricket Ground, is a cricket venue in Alur, a settlement on the outskirts of Bangalore, India. The venue has three cricket grounds called Platinum Oval, Golden Oval and Silver Oval.

The 30 acres land for the facility was acquired in early-2000s by KM Ramprasad, who was the president of the Karnataka State Cricket Association (KSCA) during that time. The facility hosted its first official match in 2011, with the Royal Challengers-KSCA Academy moving to the venue soon after. In 2013, KSCA inaugurated the facility's Platinum Jubilee Pavilion which serves as a common pavilion for Golden and Silver Ovals. The facility has 22 practice pitches, and an indoor practice provision.

== Gallery ==
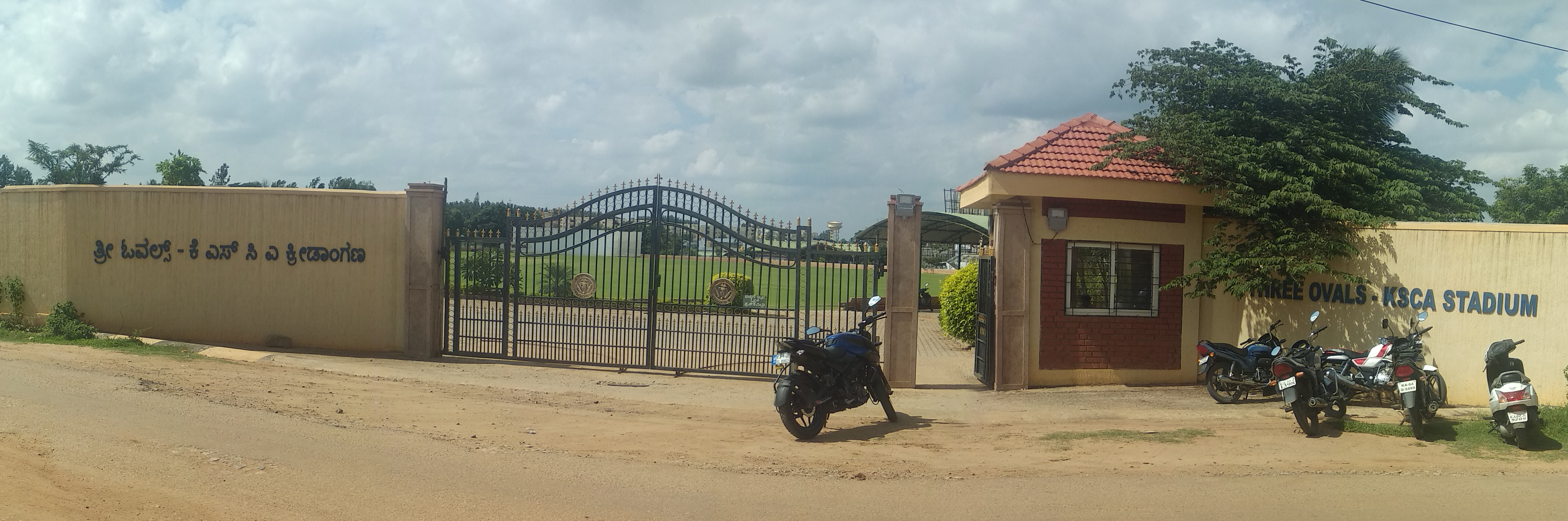
Entrance of the Three Ovals KSCA Stadium

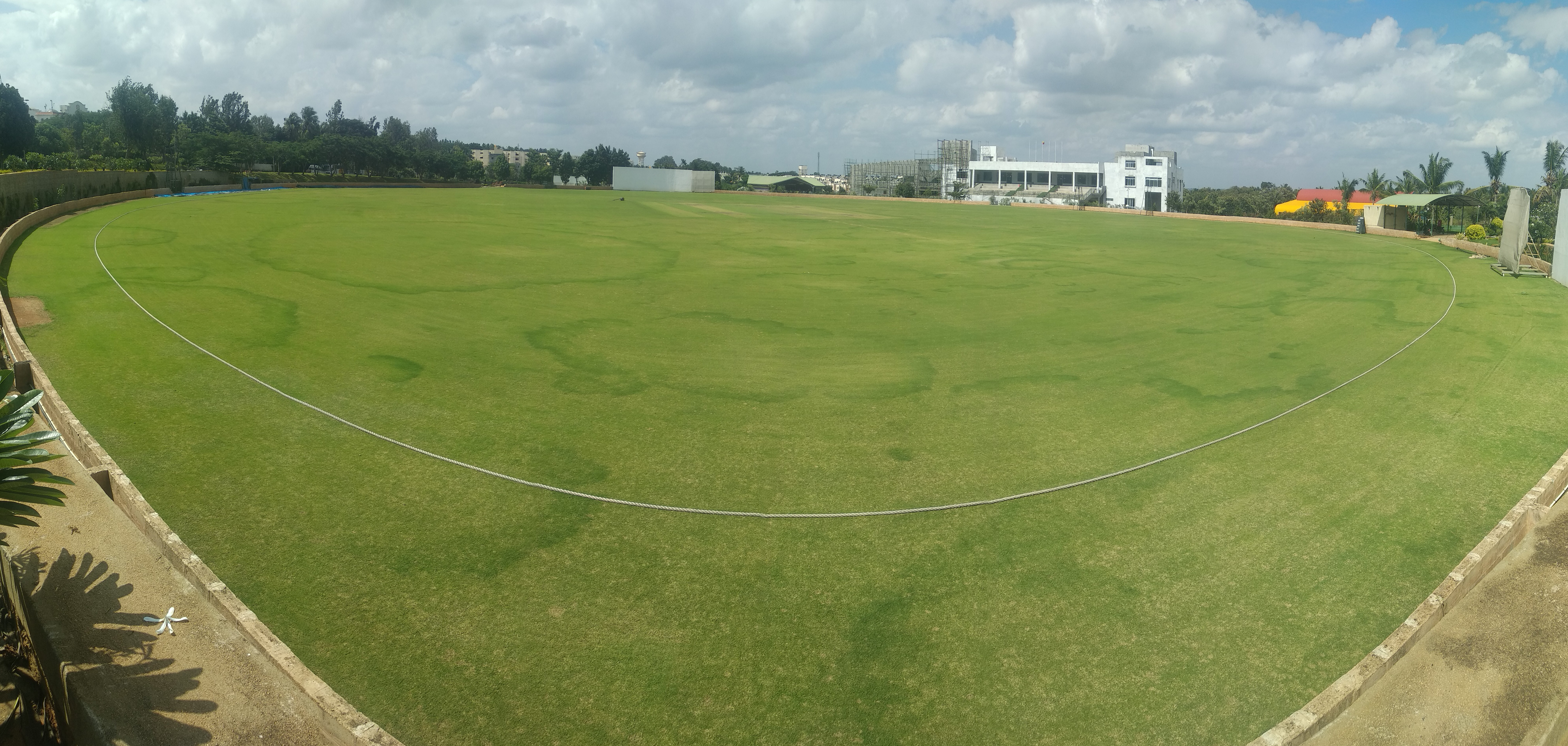
Platinum Oval

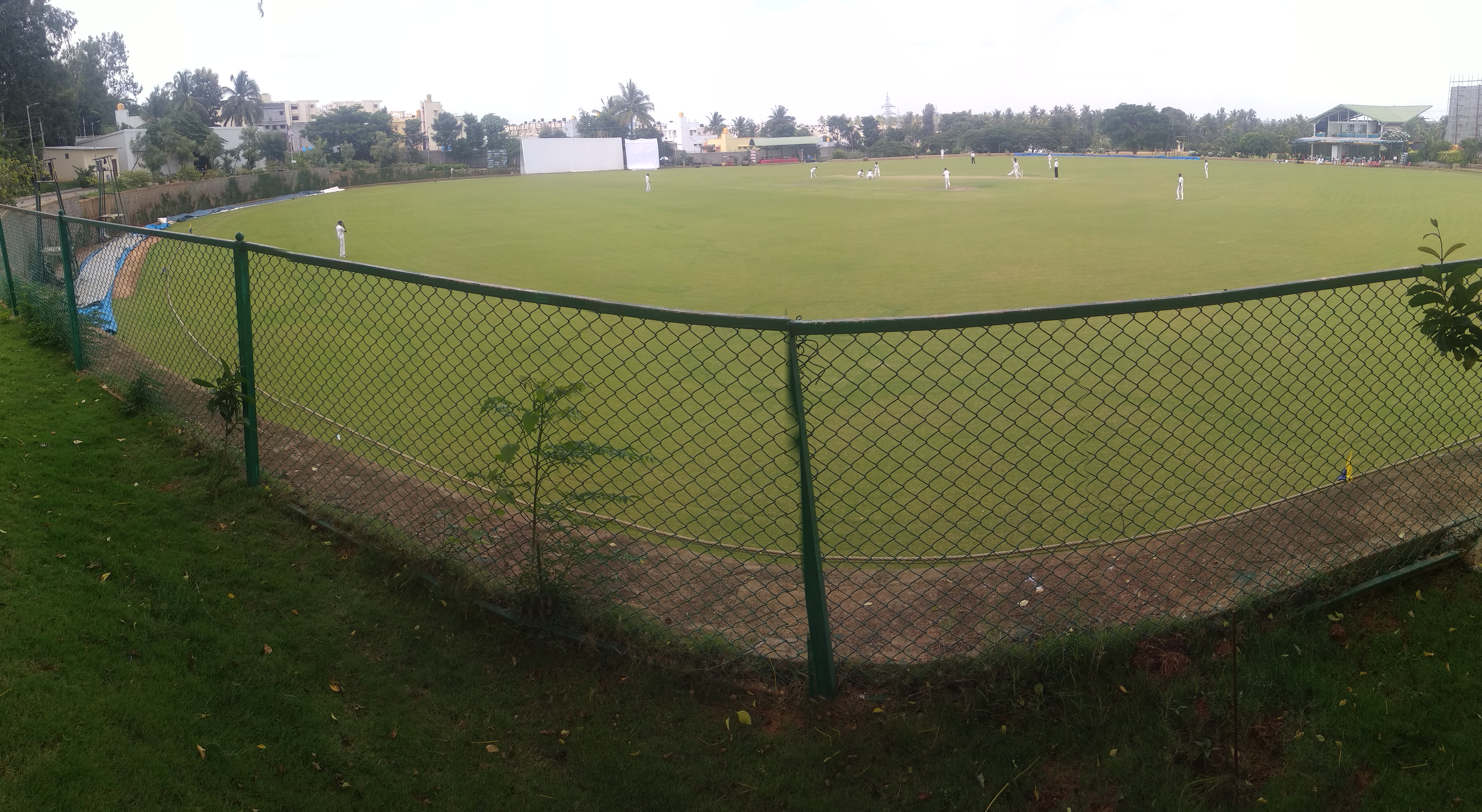
Golden Oval during a 2019–20 Duleep Trophy match between India Green and India Red
