= List of Bengal cricketers =

Cricketers who have played for Bengal in senior matches

This is a list of all cricketers who have played in first-class, List A or Twenty20 matches for Bengal, mostly in the Ranji Trophy (FC), Vijay Hazare Trophy (LA), and Syed Mushtaq Ali Trophy (T20) competitions. Seasons given are the first and last in which each player represented Bengal, but they may not have played in all the interim seasons and many played for other senior teams besides Bengal. Players in bold have played international cricket.

Teams called Bengal were formed in 1889/90 and 1922/23 on special occasions but the matches they played were not first-class. The 23 players who took part in those matches have been included with a ‡ symbol to indicate status. Bengal made their senior debut in 1935/36 when they played the touring Australians and then joined the Ranji Trophy.

Last updated 18 November 2023.

== A ==
Name	Seasons	Notes	Refs
Prabir Acharya	1995/96	Slow left arm orthodox (SLA) bowler, born 3 November 1961. Played in two Ranji Trophy matches, versus Tripura and Assam, in January 1996; also one List A match versus Assam.	
‡ G. F. Alexander	1889/90	British expatriate who played for Bengal v G. F. Vernon's XI in December 1889. No personal information recorded in usual sources.	
James Alexander	1936/37–1937/38	English right arm fast medium bowler (RFM), born 3 September 1916. Played in the Ranji Trophy final against Nawanagar in February 1937, and in one more Ranji match versus Central India in January 1938. Killed in action on 23 October 1943, during World War II, at Bhawanipur in Bengal.	
Alok Singh	2012/13–2017/18	RFM bowler, born 26 October 1993. Played in two LA and three T20 matches only. Has not played in FC.	
Boddupalli Amit	2013/14–2019/20	All-rounder, born 30 March 1988, who bowled right-arm medium pace (RM). He played in nine FC and nine LA matches, all for Bengal. HS: 50; BB: 3/31.	
**Pravin Amre**	1996/97	International batsman, born 14 August 1968, who represented India in eleven Tests and 37 ODIs between 1991/92 and 1993/94. Played for various domestic teams including one season with Bengal.	
**Madhav Apte**	1957/58	Test batsman who was born 5 October 1932 and died 23 September 2019. Apart from one season with Bengal, he spent his entire career at Bombay. Played in seven Tests for India in 1952/53.	
Kapil Arora	1994/95	No personal information recorded in usual sources. Played in two LA matches only.	
Munish Arora	1998/99	All-rounder; born 10 March 1971. Left hand bat who bowled SLA. Spent one season with Bengal after playing for Punjab since 1990/91.	
G. Arratoon	1935/36	Few personal details recorded. Right-handed batsman who bowled off spin (OB). Played in three matches in Bengal's debut FC season, including the team's first-ever FC match (versus Australians) and two more in the Ranji Trophy.	
**Arun Lal**	1981/82–1995/96	Born 1 August 1955. All-rounder who bowled RM. Played in 156 FC matches (16 Tests) and 65 LA (13 ODIs). He was India's Cricketer of the Year in 1987.	

== B ==
Name	Seasons	Notes	Refs
Suvankar Bal	2020/21–2022/23	Born 1995. Batter who has played in nine matches (two FC, four LA, three T20) to end of 2022/23 season.	
Abhisek Banerjee (A. K. Banerjee)	2008/09		
Amit Banerjee (A. A. Banerjee II)	2014/15		
Amitava Banerjee (A. A. Banerjee I)	1996/97–2000/01		
Audrish Banerjee (A. Banerjee)	1992/93	Born in Belurmath in 1975, and primarily a bowler (style uncertain), he made his sole first-class appearance for Bengal in February 1993. He had previously played for the India under-19s against England u-19s.	
Jitendra Banerjee (J. N. Banerjee)	1935/36–1939/40		
Malay Banerjee (M. Banerjee)	1976/77–1980/81		
**Montu Banerjee** (S. A. Banerjee)	1941/42–1953/54		
Rabi Banerjee (R. Banerjee)	1970/71–1974/75		
Rohan Banerjee (R. B. Banerjee)	2008/09–2014/15		
Salil Banerjee (S. K. Banerjee)	1958/59–1961/62		
Sambaran Banerjee (S. Banerjee I)	1973/74–1989/90		
**Shute Banerjee** (S. N. Banerjee)	1935/36–1936/37		
Souvik Banerjee (S. R. Banerjee)	1996/97		
Srimanta Banerjee (S. Banerjee II)	1977/78–1978/79		
Suvojit Banerjee (S. S. Banerjee)	2014/15		
**Subroto Banerjee** (S. T. Banerjee)	1996/97–1998/99		
Tapan Banerjee (T. J. Banerjee)	1965/66–1982/83		
Udaybhanu Banerjee (U. Banerjee)	1978/79–1985/86		
Madhurya Barua	1959/60		
Arijit Basu	2000/01–2002/03		
Gitimoy Basu	2010/11–2013/14		
Jayojit Basu	2011/12–2013/14		
Jack Bedwell	1940/41		
Stanley Behrend	1935/36–1940/41		
**Prakash Bhandari**	1958/59–1963/64		
Ramesh Bhatia	1964/65–1971/72		
Aloke Bhattacharjee (A. Bhattacharjee II)	1970/71–1986/87		
Anil Bhattacharjee (A. Bhattacharjee I)	1953/54–1964/65		
Ayan Bhattacharjee (A. P. Bhattacharjee)	2016/17–2019/20		
Kamal Bhattacharjee (K. Bhattacharjee)	1963/64		
Sanat Bhattacharjee (S. Bhattacharjee II)	1982/83		
Sankar Bhattacharjee (S. Bhattacharjee III)	1986/87	Born in 1963 at Dehra Dun in Uttar Pradesh, he is known to have played only four cricket matches; the first being his solitary first-class appearance for Bengal in the 1986/87 Ranji Trophy. He played other matches later the same season for Calcutta University and East Zone Universities.	
Satyen Bhattacharjee (S. Bhattacharjee IV)	1991/92		
Subir Bhattacharjee (S. Bhattacharjee I)	1980/81		
Tara Bhattacharjee (T. S. Bhattacharjee)	1938/39–1940/41		
Arup Bhattacharya (A. Bhattacharya)	1980/81–1989/90		
Kamal Bhattacharya (K. Bhattacharya)	1935/36–1946/47		
Parthasarathi Bhattacharya (P. A. Bhattacharya)	2011/12–2015/16		
Prasanta Bhattacharya (P. Bhattacharya)	1958/59–1959/60		
Tapan Bhattacharya (T. Bhattacharya)	1974/75		
Kalyan Biswas	1955/56–1961/62		
Nripesh Biswas	1963/64		
J. S. Blackburn	1962/63		
Bapi Bose (S. M. Bose)	1935/36		
Ganapathi Bose (G. Bose)	1965/66		
Ganesh Bose (H. M. Bose)	1935/36–1942/43		
**Gopal Bose** (G. K. Bose)	1968/69–1977/78		
‡ H. Bose	1922/23	Played for Bengal in the 1922/23 Nagpur Provincial Tournament. One of the team's first native players. No personal information recorded in usual sources.	
Kartick Bose (N. M. Bose)	1935/36–1951/52		
Parimal Bose	1962/63		
Ranadeb Bose (R. R. Bose)	1998/99–2011/12		
Sivaji Bose aka S. M. Basu Thakur	1949/50–1957/58		
Sujit Bose (S. Bose II)	1957/58–1959/60		
Sushil Bose (S. Bose I)	1935/36–1948/49		
John Brocklebank	1947/48		
‡ R. E. J. Brooke	1922/23	British expatriate who played for Bengal in the 1922/23 Nagpur Provincial Tournament. No personal information recorded in usual sources.	
Barun Burman	1972/73–1986/87		

== C ==
Name	Seasons	Notes	Refs
‡ C. C. Cameron	1889/90		
‡ L. Carberry	1922/23		
Paul Carey	1944/45		
George Carter	1937/38–1938/39		
Probir Chail (P. Chail II)	1977/78–1982/83		
Prolay Chail (P. Chail I)	1969/70–1975/76		
Samir Chakrabarti	1971/72–1975/76		
Dibyendu Chakrabarty	2003/04–2010/11		
Amitava Chakraborty	2001/02–2007/08		
Debasis Chakraborty	1984/85		
Gopal Chakraborty	1954/55–1963/64		
Pritam Chakraborty	2013/14	Born 1994. Bowls RM. Has played in four FC and five T20 for Bengal.	
Shreyan Swarup Chakraborty	2019/20		
Rabindra Chanda	1954/55–1963/64		
Sudip Chanda	1998/99		
Pramod Chandila	2015/16–2017/18		
Nandu Chandravarkar	1974/75		
Charanjit Singh	1997/98–1999/2000		
Anirban Chatterjee (A. B. Chatterjee)	2003/04–2004/05		
Asoke Chatterjee (A. C. Chatterjee)	1943/44–1947/48		
Champi Chatterjee (C. Chatterjee I)	1983/84		
Chandranath Chatterjee (C. Chatterjee II)	1986/87		
Nirmal Chatterjee	1937/38–1954/55		
Premangsu Chatterjee	1946/47–1959/60		
Sudip Chatterjee	2009/10–2021/22		
**Utpal Chatterjee**	1984/85–2004/05		
Writtick Chatterjee	2013/14–2022/23	Born 1992. Bowls OB.	
Saksham Chaudhary	2023/24	Born 1999. Seamer who bowls right-arm medium pace. Saksham Sarueshkumar Chaudhary made his T20 debut in October 2023 and played in two matches.	
Rana Chowdhary	2006/07–2007/08		
Abhishek Chowdhury (A. A. Chowdhary)	2010/11		
Avik Chowdhury (A. S. Chowdhary)	2007/08–2008/09		
Bikash Chowdhury	1959/60–1962/63		
Kalyan Chowdhury	1970/71–1978/79		
**Nirode Chowdhury**	1944/45–1954/55		
‡ E. W. Collen	1889/90		
Maharaja of Cooch Behar	1942/43–1945/46		
David Cooper	1942/43		

== D ==
Name	Seasons	Notes	Refs
Daljit Singh	1958/59–1961/62		
Michael Dalvi	1977/78–1981/82		
Rajesh Dani	1981/82–1986/87		
Abhishek Das (A. A. Das)	2012/13–2022/23	Born 1990. Batter who had played 23 matches (five FC, five LA, thirteen T20) to end of 2022/23 season.	
Ajoy Das (A. K. Das III)	1996/97–2000/01		
Amitava Das (A. Das)	1987/88		
Anup Das (A. K. Das II)	1985/86–1995/96		
Ardhendu Das (A. K. Das I)	1941/42		
Arindam Das (A. S. Das)	2001/02–2014/15		
Debabrata Das (D. B. Das)	2007/08–2019/20		
Dhruba Das (D. R. Das)	1941/42–1952/53		
Jyotish Das	1999/2000		
Mintoo Das	1985/86–1993/94		
Nilkantha Das	2019/20–2021/22		
Prosenjit Das (P. S. Das)	2016/17		
Pulak Das (P. Das)	1996/97		
Subhomoy Das (S. G. Das)	2001/02–2013/14		
Sandipan Das (S. S. Das)	2012/13–2014/15		
Suman Kumar Das	2023/24	Born 1999. Bowls RFM.	
Ajit Das Gupta	1949/50–1954/55		
Anil Das Gupta	1952/53–1955/56		
Benu Das Gupta	1952/53–1955/56		
Sunil Das Gupta	1952/53		
**Deep Dasgupta**	1998/99–2009/10		
Jayanta Dastidar	1991/92		
Ambar Datta	1962/63		
Punya Datta	1944/45–1955/56		
Kinkar Daw	1958/59		
‡ J. de Lisle	1922/23		
Amiya Deb	1941/42–1943/44		
Akash Deep	2018/19–2023/24	Born 1996. Currently (2023/24) opens the Bengal bowling with a right-arm fast medium (RFM) action. He also played in seven IPL matches for Royal Challengers Bangalore in 2022/23.	
Devendra Singh	1961/62		
Subir Dey	1986/87–1995/96		
Kalyan Dhall	1984/85–1985/86		
Madan Dhar	1964/65–1965/66		
Dharmendra Singh	1996/97–1998/99		
‡ H. W. Dickson	1889/90		
**Ashok Dinda**	2005/06–2019/20		
**Dilip Doshi**	1968/69–1984/85		
Karun Dubey	1987/88–1988/89		
Anil Dutt	1939/40		
Probodh Dutt	1936/37–1943/44		
Sailesh Dutt	1938/39–1943/44		
Dilip Dutta	1976/77		
Jyoti Dutta	1958/59		
Probal Dutta	1995/96		
Rajib Dutta	1997/98		

== E ==
Name	Seasons	Notes	Refs
Abhimanyu Easwaran	2013/14–2023/24	Born 1995. Opening batter who has been a standby for India Test squads. Has made 22 FC hundreds with a highest score (HS) of 233.	
Frederick Eccleston	1939/40		
Eklak Ahmid	2006/07		

== F ==
Name	Seasons	Notes	Refs
Farsatullah	1977/78–1981/82		
Humza Ferozie	1995/96–2001/02		
‡ L. Ford	1922/23	British expatriate who played for Bengal in the 1922/23 Nagpur Provincial Tournament. No personal information recorded in usual sources.	
Benjamin Frank	1948/49–1953/54		

== G ==
Name	Seasons	Notes	Refs
**Devang Gandhi**	1994/95–2005/06		
**Ashok Gandotra**	1971/72–1973/74		
Santosh Ganguli	1937/38–1942/43		
Prasenjit Ganguly	1996/97–2002/03		
Snehasish Ganguly	1986/87–1996/97		
**Sourav Ganguly**	1989/90–2011/12		
Subhradeep Ganguly	2002/03		
Aamir Gani	2013/14–2018/19		
Alexander Garbis	1940/41–1947/48		
**Rohan Gavaskar**	1996/97–2009/10		
Sudip Kumar Gharami	2019/20–2023/24	Born 1999. Appointed Bengal's T20 captain for the Syed Mushtaq Ali Trophy in October 2023. Has scored four FC hundreds (HS 186) and two LA hundreds (HS 162).	
Akash Ghatak	2022/23	Born 1996. Bowls RM. Has played in five matches for Bengal (three FC, two LA).	
Dilip Ghose	1950/51		
Arindam Ghosh (A. N. Ghosh)	2006/07–2011/12		
Avilin Ghosh (A. P. Ghosh)	2013/14		
Dipankar Ghosh	1964/65–1968/69		
Gour Ghosh	1960/61–1964/65		
Jiban Ghosh	1965/66–1969/70		
Kalyan Ghosh (K. K. Ghosh)	1968/69–1970/71		
Koushik Ghosh (K. B. Ghosh)	2013/14–2022/23	Born 1992. Has played in FC matches only with 17 appearances to end of 2022/23 season. Has scored two FC hundreds (HS 114).	
Madan Ghosh (M. Ghosh)	1977/78–1983/84		
Manojit Ghosh (M. U. Ghosh)	2013/14		
Nemai Ghosh	1958/59–1965/66		
Probal Ghosh (P. Ghosh I)	1978/79–1984/85		
Prasanta Ghosh (P. Ghosh II)	1979/80		
Sayan Ghosh (S. S. Ghosh)	2013/14–2021/22		
Soham Ghosh (S. S. Ghosh)	2007/08		
Shanti Ghoshal	1954/55–1964/65		
Leonard Gilbert	1935/36		
John Gilchrist	1957/58–1959/60		
Amarnath Girdhari	1960/61		
Surjuram Girdhari	1948/49–1959/60		
‡ Godfrey	1889/90		
Chuni Goswami (S. Goswami)	1962/63–1972/73		
Shreevats Goswami (S. P. Goswami)	2007/08–2021/22		
Robert Gourlay	1936/37		
Ernest Goward	1935/36		
‡ C. E. Greenway	1889/90		
**Subrata Guha**	1965/66–1976/77		
Surup Guha Thakurta	1963/64–1965/66		
Bhaskar Gupta	1964/65		
Sumanta Gupta	2017/18–2022/23		
**Baloo Gupte**	1957/58		
**Subhash Gupte**	1953/54–1957/58		

== H ==
Name	Seasons	Notes	Refs
Shakir Habib Gandhi	2023/24	Born 1999. Made his T20 debut in October 2023 and played in six matches. Yet to play in FC or LA.	
Debopratim Halder	pending	Born 2002. Bowls RFM. Debopratim Kalyan Halder has been named as a Bengal squad member for the 2023/24 season.	
Nikhil Haldipur	1994/95–2004/05		
Amherst Hammond	1939/40		
Fred Harker	1944/45		
Edward Harvey-Johnston	1942/43–1943/44		
Haseen Ahmed	1980/81		
‡ H. Heckle	1889/90	British expatriate who played for Bengal v G. F. Vernon's XI in December 1889. No personal information recorded in usual sources.	
**Narendra Hirwani**	1996/97		
‡ P. Hoender	1922/23	British expatriate who played for Bengal in the 1922/23 Nagpur Provincial Tournament. No personal information recorded in usual sources.	
Amit Hore	1987/88		
Alexander Hosie	1935/36–1937/38		
Louis Hunt	1935/36		
Hyder Ali	1979/80		

== I ==
Name	Seasons	Notes	Refs
Mohammad Idris	1978/79	No personal information recorded in usual sources. Played in one List A match only.	
Charles Inder	1937/38	English left-arm spin bowler, born 2 July 1914. Played in four first-class matches, two for Bengal in 1937/38 and two for Europeans in the 1938/39 Bombay Quadrangular. He died in February 2001.	

== J ==
Name	Seasons	Notes	Refs
Abdul Jabbar	1938/39–1943/44		
Rusi Jeejeebhoy	1965/66–1972/73		
Abhishek Jhunjhunwala	2005/06–2012/13		
Jitendra Singh	1987/88		
Munish Jolly	1997/98		
Peter Judge	1944/45		

== K ==
Name	Seasons	Notes	Refs
Shrikant Kalyani	1989/90–2000/01		
Ahmed Kamal	1936/37–1940/41		
Sushil Kapoor	1961/62–1963/64		
**Saba Karim**	1994/95–2000/01		
Soumen Karmarkar	1993/94		
Norman Kendrew	1940/41		
**Ramnath Kenny**	1961/62		
Ranjot Singh Khaira	2021/22–2023/24	Born 1998. Yet to make first-class debut. Has played in two LA and twelve T20 matches.	
Keki Khambatta	1935/36–1937/38		
Satish Khanna	1950/51–1959/60		
J. E. King	1935/36		
**Lester King**	1962/63	Born 27 February 1939 in Saint Catherine, Jamaica. He was a West Indies international fast bowler who played in two Tests. He was one of four West Indian fast bowlers who played a season of domestic cricket in India in 1962–63 in order to give Indian batsmen more experience of playing fast bowling. He played for Bengal and East Zone, taking 19 wickets in six matches with a best return of 5 for 146 in Bengal's victory in the Ranji Trophy quarter-final against Hyderabad. He died in Kingston on 9 July 1998.	
Rakesh Krishnan	2004/05		
Satyendra Kuckreja	1957/58–1963/64		
Amit Kuila	2014/15–2016/17		
Ravi Kumar	2022/23	Born 2003. Bowls left-arm medium pace (LM). Rajendrasingh Ravi Kumar has played in five T20 matches for Bengal and in ten Under-19 ODI for the India Under-19s.	
Ritam Kundu	2004/05–2008/09		
Soumendranath Kundu	1958/59–1968/69		
Karan Lal	2022/23–present		

== L ==
Name	Seasons	Notes	Refs
Alokendu Lahiri	1994/95–2002/03		
Saurasish Lahiri	1999/2000–2014/15	Born 1981. Has played a 100 FC, 76 List A and 22 T20 matches for Bengal and was the captain of the team for 4 matches. Is the current Assistant Coach for Bengal.	
Karan Lal	2021/22–2023/24	Born 2000. Bowls off spin (OB). Has played four FC and fifteen T20 matches for Bengal to October 2023. Member of India Under-19s in 2019/20 and played in seven Under-19 ODIs.	
Murtaza Lodhgar	1997/98–2007/08		
Tom Longfield	1935/36–1938/39		

== M ==
Name	Seasons	Notes	Refs
Jamshed Madan	1942/43		
K. Mahalingam	1953/54		
Kaushik Maity	2023/24	Born 1999. Bowls slow left arm orthodox (SLA). Made his T20 debut in October 2023 and played in three matches.	
Anustup Majumdar	2004/05–2023/24	Born 1984. Has not played in T20 since 2020/21. 81 FC appearances to end of 2022/23 season and has scored thirteen hundreds (HS 159). Played for Railways in 2014/15, then returned to Bengal.	
Debu Majumdar	1999/2000		
Wrichik Majumder	1998/99–2000/01		
Basil Malcolm	1938/39		
**Ashok Malhotra**	1987/88–1994/95		
**Vijay Manjrekar**	1953/54		
**Vinoo Mankad**	1948/49		
Abdul Masood	1996/97–1999/2000		
Bhaskar Mazumbar	1985/86		
A. Mazumdar	1953/54		
Aloke Mazumdar	1965/66–1967/68		
Patrick Miller	1936/37–1939/40		
Abhik Mitra	1978/79–1986/87		
Bimal Mitra (B. K. Mitra)	1938/39–1943/44		
Buddhadeb Mitra (B. Mitra)	1974/75		
Debu Mitra	1968/69–1973/74		
Pulin Mitra	1947/48		
Shyam Mitra (S. S. Mitra)	1958/59–1971/72		
Suhrid Mitra (S. Mitra)	1939/40–1944/45		
Jyotish Mitter	1950/51–1958/59		
Kalyan Mitter	1953/54–1964/65		
Mohammed Kaif	2020/21–2023/24	Born 1996 and aka Kaif Ahmed. Brother of Mohammed Shami. Bowls right-arm medium-fast (RMF). Has played in four LA matches to November 2023.	
**Mohammed Shami**	2010/11–2018/19		
Ranadeep Moitra	1986/87–1992/93		
Dhirendranath Mondal	1955/56		
Jiten Mondal	1984/85		
Kamal Mondal	2005/06–2007/08		
Sayan Mondal	2009/10–2022/23	Born 1989. Bowls right-arm medium pace (RM). Made 26 FC, 26 LA and 23 T20 appearances to end of 2022/23 season. Has scored 1,009 FC runs (HS 135) and taken 24 wickets with best bowling (BB) of 4/71.	
‡ C. S. More	1922/23		
Sumitro Mujumder	1996/97–1997/98		
**Mukesh Kumar**	2015/16–2023/24	Born 1993. Bowls RFM.	
Dattatreya Mukherjee (D. Mukherjee II)	1987/88–1991/92		
Debabrata Mukherjee (D. Mukherjee I)	1963/64–1971/72		
Durga Mukherjee (D. S. Mukherjee)	1958/59–1964/65		
Joydeep Mukherjee	1987/88–1994/95		
Priyankar Mukherjee	2006/07–2008/09		
Raja Mukherjee	1967/68–1978/79		
Raju Mukherjee	1972/73–1981/82		
Robin Mukherjee	1966/67–1968/69		
Saikat Mukherjee	2001/02		
**Saradindu Mukherjee** (S. P. Mukherjee)	1989/90–1995/96		
Sujan Mukherjee	1980/81–1985/86		
Ashoke Mustafi	1958/59		
Sisir Mustafi	1941/42–1949/50		

== N ==
Name	Seasons	Notes	Refs
T. S. Nahapiet	1936/37		
Arnab Nandi	2009/10–2020/21		
Palash Nandy	1969/70–1983/84		
Pranob Nandy	1979/80–1986/87		
Sunil Nandy	1958/59		
Samarendra Nath	1966/67–1967/68		
Naved Ahmed	2015/16		
**C. S. Nayudu**	1950/51–1951/52		
Pradeep Neogy	1981/82		
‡ G. S. Nixon	1889/90		
John Nuttall	1941/42		

== O ==
Name	Seasons	Notes	Refs
Mohammad-Al Obaidullah	1941/42	Born in 1913 at Calcutta, Obaidullah played all three of his first-class matches for Bengal during the 1941–42 Ranji Trophy. He scored a total of 84 runs and took three wickets. He died in 1991.	
**Pragyan Ojha**	2015/16–2016/17	A former Indian international, Ojha played for Bengal for two seasons, making a total of 34 appearances for the team.	
‡ Owens	1889/90	British expatriate who played for Bengal v G. F. Vernon's XI in December 1889. No personal information recorded in usual sources.	

== P ==
Name	Seasons	Notes	Refs
Saumya Pakray	2009/10		
**Phiroze Palia**	1948/49		
Krishna Pamani	1974/75		
Agniv Pan	2016/17–2022/23	Born 1997. Played in thirty matches to November 2022 (nine FC, ten LA, eleven T20) with 29 dismissals (22 caught, seven stumped).	
Sumit Panda	1999/2000		
Pradeep Pandey	1972/73–1983/84		
Madansingh Parmar	1960/61–1962/63		
T. V. Parthasarathi	1944/45–1945/46		
Sujoy Parui	2000/01		
Avijit Paul	1980/81		
Shib Paul	2000/01–2014/15		
Subhojit Paul	2005/06–2006/07		
**Dattu Phadkar**	1954/55–1957/58		
Prakash Poddar	1960/61–1976/77		
Abhishek Porel	2021/22–2023/24	Born 2002. Wicket-keeper. Played in sixteen FC matches to end of 2022/23 season. Has dismissed 66 batters with 58 catches and eight stumped. Played in fourteen T20s to October 2023 (five caught).	
Ishan Porel	2016/17–2023/24	Born 1998. Bowls RFM.	
Subroto Porel	1977/78–1982/83		
Writam Porel	2010/11–2012/13		
Pradipta Pramanik	2015/16–2023/24	Born 1998. Bowls SLA.	
Ramesh Prasad	2019/20		
Veer Pratap Singh	2011/12–2016/17		
‡ F. Pugsley	1943/44		
Dev Puri	1941/42–1946/47		
Geet Puri	2021/22–2022/23	Born 1994. Geet Puri bowls left arm fast medium (LFM). He has played in two FC, seven LA and one T20 matches to the end of the 2022/23 season. His best bowling return to date is 3/15 in an LA match.	

== R ==
Name	Seasons	Notes	Refs
Murthy Rajan	1975/76		
Hari Rajguru	1960/61		
Rajinder Singh	1988/89–1990/91		
Ram Prasad Ram	1963/64		
Abhishek Raman	2016/17–2022		
Bhurke Ramchandra	1940/41–1941/42		
Ravikant Singh	2012/13–2022/23		
Prayas Ray Barman	2018/19–2023/24	Born 2000. Bowls off break (OB). Has played nine LA and seven T20 for Bengal, but has yet to make his FC debut. He also played in one IPL match for Royal Challengers Bangalore in 2019.	
‡ C. M. Reddie	1922/23		
**Ambar Roy** (A. K. Roy)	1960/61–1977/78		
Amitava Roy (A. Roy)	1972/73–1973/74		
Aniruddha Roy (A. H. Roy)	2003/04		
Debendra Roy	1992/93–1993/94		
Gobindalal Roy	1950/51–1951/52		
Indu Bhushan Roy	1987/88–1993/94		
Khiroja Roy	1939/40–1940/41		
Nemailal Roy	1960/61–1971/72		
**Pankaj Roy**	1946/47–1967/68		
**Pranab Roy**	1978/79–1991/92		
‡ S. Roy	1922/23		
Sanjit Roy	1950/51–1951/52		
Shivaji Roy	1964/65–1968/69		
Tapash Roy	1962/63–1966/67		
Ritwik Roy Chowdhury	2014/15–2023/24	Born 1995. Roy Chowdhury is a short-form specialist and has made only four FC appearances from 2019/20 to 2021/22. Including the 2023/24 season, he has so far played in 20 LA and 33 T20 matches.	

== S ==
Name	Seasons	Notes	Refs
Sabir Ali	2000/01–2004/05	Born 1981. Right-arm medium pace bowler who later played for Tripura and Railways. Made twelve FC appearances taking 27 wickets with a best return of 6/48.	
Hirendranath Sadhu	1939/40		
Safi Ahmed	1998/99–2007/08		
Nilamber Saha	1998/99–1999/2000		
**Wriddhiman Saha**	2006/07–2021/22		
Kazi Junaid Saifi	2019/20–2022/23	Born 1998. Left-handed batsman who has made three FC appearances to end of 2022/23 season.	
Rajendranath Sanyal	1956/57–1961/62		
Sanjib Sanyal	2000/01–2013/14		
Arindam Sarkar	1994/95–1998/99		
Dipankar Sarkar	1966/67–1974/75		
Jolly Sarkar	1964/65–1967/68		
Rash Sarkar	1966/67		
Sourav Sarkar (S. S. Sarkar)	2006/07–2015/16		
Subrata Sarkar (S. Sarkar)	1953/54		
Madhukar Sathe	1959/60		
Satyendra Singh	1986/87–1990/91		
Saurabh Singh	2016/17		
V. Savant	1961/62–1963/64		
Iresh Saxena	2007/08–2014/15		
William Scott	1936/37–1937/38		
Amiya Sen	1957/58		
Mantu Sen	1943/44–1958/59		
Partha Sen (P. Sen)	1983/84		
**Probir Sen** (P. K. Sen)	1943/44–1957/58		
Ranabir Sen	1962/63–1971/72		
Swapan Sen	1973/74		
Moinak Sengupta	1995/96–1999/2000		
Sagarmoy Sensharma	1987/88–1996/97		
Kanishk Seth	2014/15–2018/19		
Rajiv Seth	1989/90–1993/94		
**Shahbaz Ahmed**	2018/19–2023/24	Born 1994. Bowls SLA. Made FC debut for Bengal v Hyderabad in December 2018. HS: 116 (one hundred); BB: 7/57 (four 5wI). Has played for India in 3 ODI and 2 T20I. Played in 39 IPL for Royal Challengers Bangalore since 2021.	
Alok Sharma	2012/13		
**Chetan Sharma**	1993/94–1996/97		
Alexander Shaw	1935/36		
Jitender Shaw	2013/14		
Pankaj Shaw	2013/14–2016/17		
Adil Sheikh	1992/93–1993/94		
Shibsagar Singh	1996/97–2014/15		
Gautam Shome	1984/85–1997/98		
Gautam Kumar Shome	1984/85–1985/86		
Sumit Shome (S. Shome)	1981/82–1982/83		
Sunit Shome (S. K. Shome)	1952/53–1960/61		
**Laxmi Shukla**	1997/98–2015/16		
**Rakesh Shukla**	1984/85		
Sanjit Sil	1963/64		
Keith Sillett	1958/59		
Narinder Singh	1992/93		
Arun Singla	1994/95		
Graham Skinner	1935/36–1938/39		
Suprakash Som	1965/66		
Soumen Singh	2001/02		
Charles Sumption	1941/42		
Ivan Surita	1936/37–1938/39		
Swaranjit Singh	1959/60–1961/62		

== T ==
Name	Seasons	Notes	Refs
Cyril Tamplin	1942/43		
‡ G. F. Taylor	1889/90	British expatriate who played for Bengal v G. F. Vernon's XI in December 1889. No personal information recorded in usual sources.	
James Taylor	1952/53		
‡ H. N. Thomas	1922/23	British expatriate who played for Bengal in the 1922/23 Nagpur Provincial Tournament. No personal information recorded in usual sources.	
‡ R. E. S. Thomas	1889/90	British expatriate who played for Bengal v G. F. Vernon's XI in December 1889. No personal information recorded in usual sources.	
Anurag Tiwari	2015/16–2017/18	Born 1995. All-rounder who bowled SLA. Played in one FC and six T20 matches.	
O. P. Tiwari	1994/95		
**Manoj Tiwary**	2003/04–2023/24	Born 1985. Bowls leg break (LB). Bengal's FC captain in 2022/23. Has played in 141 FC matches with a highest score of 303* (29 hundreds). He announced his retirement in August 2023 but then decided to play on in 2023/24. He has played for India in 12 ODI and 3 T20I.	
‡ C. H. Twigg	1922/23	British expatriate who played for Bengal in the 1922/23 Nagpur Provincial Tournament. No personal information recorded in usual sources.	

== V ==
Name	Seasons	Notes	Refs
**Prashant Vaidya**	1992/93–1995/96		
Paul van der Gucht	1935/36–1947/48		
Ajay Varma	1986/87–1997/98		
Raja Venkatraman	1980/81–1991/92		
Vivek Singh	2012/13–2020/21	Born 1993. Left-handed batter who has scored centuries in all three forms. Highest score 147 in an LA match. Has also played for the Railways and rejoined them in 2021.	

== W ==
Name	Seasons	Notes	Refs
John Warren	1935/36		
Robin Waters	1962/63		
‡ White	1922/23	British expatriate who played for Bengal in the 1922/23 Nagpur Provincial Tournament. No personal information recorded in usual sources.	
Desmond Whittaker	1954/55		

== Y ==
Name	Seasons	Notes	Refs
Sujit Yadav	2021/22		
Vishal Yadav	1999/2000	Born 1967 in Haryana, Vishal Singh Yadav played as a left-handed batsman who could bowl slow left-arm orthodox, and he was an occasional wicket-keeper. He also played for Uttar Pradesh. He scored one century (exactly 100) in his 26 FC matches, and four fifties. He took seven wickets with a best return of 4/70.	
