= List of Railways cricketers =

List of first-class cricketers by club

This is an incomplete list in alphabetical order of cricketers who have played for Railways in top-class (Note: Top-class matches are first-class, List A, and Twenty20.) matches since the club initially achieved first-class status in 1958.

== Key ==
- † preceding a player's name means that the original article is now a redirect to this list.

== A ==
- Faiz Ahmed
- Habib Ahmed
- Hyder Ali
- Raja Ali
- Sabir Ali
- Lala Amarnath
- Pravin Amre
- Mohammad Aslam
- Prashant Awasthi

== B ==
- Sanjay Bangar
- Deepak Bansal
- Krishnamachari Bharatan
- Saket Bhatia
- Kamal Bhattacharjee
- Nitin Bhille
- Rohan Bhosale
- Rajesh Borah
- Sivaji Bose
- Alfred Burrows

== C ==
- Samir Chakrabarti
- Rabindra Chanda
- V. Cheluvaraj
- Nari Contractor

== D ==
- Mrunal Devdhar
- Vinit Dhulap
- † Abhinav Dixit (2019)

== F ==
- Farsatullah
- Faiz Fazal

== G ==
- Shailender Gehlot
- Arindam Ghosh
- Jiban Ghosh
- Shanti Ghoshal
- Yere Goud
- Baloo Gupte

== J ==
- Rongsen Jonathan
- Uday Joshi

== K ==
- Hitesh Kadam
- Hemlata Kala
- Rakesh Kanojia
- Murali Kartik
- Praveen Kashyap
- Habib Khan
- Ranjit Khanwilkar
- Gaurav Khatri
- Jehangir Khot
- Syed Kirmani
- Sulakshan Kulkarni
- M. Suresh Kumar
- Budhi Kunderan
- Soumendranath Kundu

== L ==
- Jagdish Lal

== M ==
- Parag Madkaikar
- Karan Mahajan
- Ranjeet Mali
- Jacob Martin
- Anil Mathur
- Bhaskar Mazumbar
- Madan Mehra
- Vijay Mehra
- Ambikeshwar Mishra
- Amit Mishra
- Sagar Mishra
- Durga Mukherjee
- Robin Mukherjee

== N ==
- Vivek Naidu
- Arnab Nandi
- B. B. Nimbalkar

== P ==
- Amit Pagnis
- † Abhishek Pandey (2021)
- † Akash Pandey (2021–2026)
- Akshat Pandey
- Madansingh Parmar
- Dhiraj Parsana
- Asad Ullah Khan Pathan
- Amit Paunikar
- Dattu Phadkar

== Q ==
- Shahid Qureshi

== R ==
- Vasant Ranjane
- Balaji Rao
- Bhima Rao
- Manish Rao
- Mahesh Rawat

== S ==
- Rahul Sanghvi
- Rajendranath Sanyal
- Sanjib Sanyal
- Dipankar Sarkar
- Vineet Saxena
- Ashish Sehrawat
- Swapan Sen
- Mohammad Shahid
- Abhay Sharma
- Karn Sharma
- Sanjeev Sharma
- Vishal Sharma
- Shivakant Shukla
- Baba Sidhaye
- Anureet Singh
- Ashish Singh
- † Avijit Singh (2021)
- Harvinder Singh
- Hemant Singh
- Manjeet Singh
- Narinder Singh
- Pappu Singh
- Pratham Singh
- Vivek Singh
- Anant Solkar

== T ==
- Satender Thakran
- Karan Thakur

== U ==
- Krishnakant Upadhyay

== V ==
- Sunil Valson
- Rajeswar Vats
- Siddharth Verma

== Y ==
- Akash Yadav
- Ashish Yadav
- Jai Prakash Yadav

== Z ==
- Zakaria Zuffri
