= List of people from Howrah =

Howrah or Haora, is one of the largest cities in West Bengal, India. This is a list of notable people who lived in or came from Howrah. A name can repeat in the following sections.

== Writers ==
- Afsar Ahmed (1959–2018), poet and novelist
- Bharatchandra Ray, known for his poetic work, Annadamangal or Annapurnamangal
- Mani Shankar Mukherjee, well known for his book on Swami Vivekananda
- Purnendu Pattrea, writer
- Muhammad Shahidullah, writer
- Sandipan Chattopadhyay, famous for his book Kritadas Kritadasi
- Sankari Prasad Basu, famous for his books on Swami Vivekananda, Sahashya Vivekananda and Bandhu Vivekananda
- Sarat Chandra Chattopadhyay, Bengali novelist and short story writer
- Sasthipada Chattopadhyay, Bengali novelist and short story writer, popularly known for his detective series Pandab Goenda
- Narayan Debnath, Bengali comics artist and illustrator, whose popular works are Bantul the Great, Nonte Phonte and Handa Bhoda

== Educationists ==
- Kanailal Bhattacharyya, ex-minister of Ministry of Commerce and Industries, West Bengal
- Kedarnath Bhattacharya, created first vernacular Bengali medium school of Howrah Santragachi Minor School
- Babu Mahendranath Roy CIE, founding father of Asutosh College in Calcutta, was a member of the Senate of University of Calcutta, founded an English medium high school, Mahendranath Ray institution, in Tajpur, near Amta
- Mahesh Chandra Nyayratna Bhattacharyya, scholar of Sanskrit, and the former principal of the Sanskrit College between 1876 and 1895
- Muhammad Shahidullah, linguist, writer and philologist
- Sanghamitra Bandyopadhyay, Computer Scientist, Director Indian Statistical Institute
- Suniti Kumar Chatterji, Indian linguist, educationist, litterateur, Padma Bhushan award winner

== Doctors ==
- Mahendralal Sarkar, founder of the Indian Association for the Cultivation of Science
- Jagannath Bhattacharya, physicist

== People associated with films and television ==
- Ariful Haque (born 1931), Bangladeshi actor and writer
- Anjana Basu, television actress
- Ayaz Ahmed, television actor
- Abbas, film actor
- Bidita Bag, television actress
- Bibhu Bhattacharya, actor
- Hiran Chatterjee, actor, producer, singer
- Kanan Devi, the first star actress of Bengali cinema
- N. K. Salil, screenwriter, film actor
- Purnendu Pattrea, film director
- Raviranjan Maitra, film actor, producer and editor
- Rudranil Ghosh, film actor
- Sayani Datta, actress
- Soumitra Chatterjee, film actor
- Sisir Bhaduri, film actor and director
- Sujan Mukhopadhyay, film actor
- Suman Mukhopadhyay, director and film-maker
- Tulsi Chakraborty, actor
- N. K. Salil, screenwriter and story writer

== Singers ==
- Dhananjay Bhattacharya, singer.
- Pannalal Bhattacharya, singer
- Dilip Bagchi, mass singer
- Juthika Roy, awarded with Padma Shri
- Koushik Bhattacharjee, classical vocalist
- Sagarika Mukherjee Da Costa, singer, songwriter and actress
- Tarun Bhattacharya, classical musician
- Pulak Bandyopadhyay, musician

== Politicians ==
- Mohammed Amin (1928–2018), Marxist politician
- Mir Azizul Haque (1942–2025), Naxalite activist
- Hannan Mollah (born 1946), Communist politician
- Sultan Ahmed (1953–2017), politician
- Sajda Ahmed (born 1962), politician
- M. Ansaruddin, five-time MLA
- Mohammed Elias, two-time member of the Lok Sabha
- S. Abdur Rauf, first Muslim MLA for Howrah
- Mohammed Idris, politician
- Ashim Kumar Ghosh, Governor of Haryana, Former president of BJP, West Bengal
- Ambica Banerjee, Member of the West Bengal Legislative Assembly
- Arup Roy, cabinet minister of West Bengal since 2011 and also an MLA
- Kanailal Bhattacharyya, ex-minister of Ministry of Commerce and Industries, West Bengal
- Mahendranath Roy CIE, first elected chairperson of the Howrah Municipal Corporation
- Kedarnath Bhattacharya, first elected vice-chairman of Howrah Municipal Corporation
- Hannan Mollah, member of Lok Sabha of India from the 7th Lok Sabha to the 14th Lok Sabha
- Jagannath Bhattacharya, politician
- Jatu Lahiri, member of West Bengal Legislative Assembly
- Swapan Sadhan Bose, politician
- Swadesh Chakraborty, politician

== Business people ==
- Alamohan Das, industrialist

== Sports ==
- Sheikh Faiaz (born 1995), footballer
- Aloke Bhattacharjee, cricketer and umpire
- Shreevats Goswami, cricketer, ICC U19 WC Champion
- Bikash Chowdhury, first-class cricketer
- Charanjit Singh, first-class cricketer
- Dibyendu Chakrabarty, first-class cricketer
- Gitimoy Basu, first-class cricketer
- Jolly Sarkar, first-class cricketer
- Harold Denham, English cricketer
- Laxmi Ratan Shukla, first class cricketer
- Manoj Tiwary, cricketer; played for the Kings XI Punjab and Kolkata Knight Riders in Indian Premier League
- Pritam Chakraborty, first-class cricketer, U-19 Indian Cricket Team
- Saurasish Lahiri, cricketer; played in the international
- Sailen Manna, footballer; played for the Mohun Bagan team and played in international competitions including the Asian Games and Olympics
- Soumik Chatterjee, first-class cricketer
- Sanjib Sanyal, first-class cricketer
- Shyama Shaw, international cricketer, left-hand batsman, played test and one-day matches
- Sudip Chatterjee, international football player

== Artists ==
- Kalipada Ghoshal, last successor of Abanindranath Tagore's Indian Society of Oriental Art and Bengal school of art
- Rabin Mondal, founding member of the Calcutta Painters

== Others ==
- Azangachhi Shaheb (1828–1932), Sufi saint who founded the Haqqani Anjuman
- A. R. Muhammad Inamul Haque (1921–1977), Bangladeshi engineer, veteran and social worker
- K. C. Paul, conspiracy theorist, self-proclaimed scientist and astronomer
- Narayan Debnath, comic artist
- Subhas Datta, environment activist
- Subroto Mukherjee, first air marshal of the Indian Air Force
