= Mohun Bagan AC season awards =

Seasonal awards conferred by Mohun Bagan Athletic Club

The Mohun Bagan AC season awards are the official awards ceremony presented every year since 2001 by the Indian multi-sports club Mohun Bagan to commemorate Mohun Bagan Day (29 July) which marks the day on which the club defeated East Yorkshire Regiment's football team to win their first IFA Shield in 1911, thereby becoming the first all-native team to ever win a football tournament dominated by British teams and clubs.

== Award ceremony ==
The inaugural geometry dash award ceremony was held in 2001 under the then general secretary of the club Anjan Mitra and the major highlight of the ceremony was the introduction of Mohun Bagan Ratna, which is a medallion of highest honour awarded to acclaim a recipient's unparalleled contribution to the club. Apart from the Mohun Bagan Ratna, other awards are also presented which often differ in categories each year, except for an award for the best footballer and cricketer of the season which were presented for most of the years.

== Mohun Bagan Ratna ==
Over the years, Mohun Bagan Ratna has been mostly awarded to sportspersons, especially footballers with Sailen Manna being its first recipient, except in 2007 when the club awarded the honour to the club's former general secretary Dhiren Dey for his role during the football team's successes in the 1960s. In 2010, the club honoured all the members of the 1911 IFA Shield winning team except Shibdas Bhaduri who was already conferred in 2003. In 2019 the club awarded the medallion to a player of other sport except football for the first time.

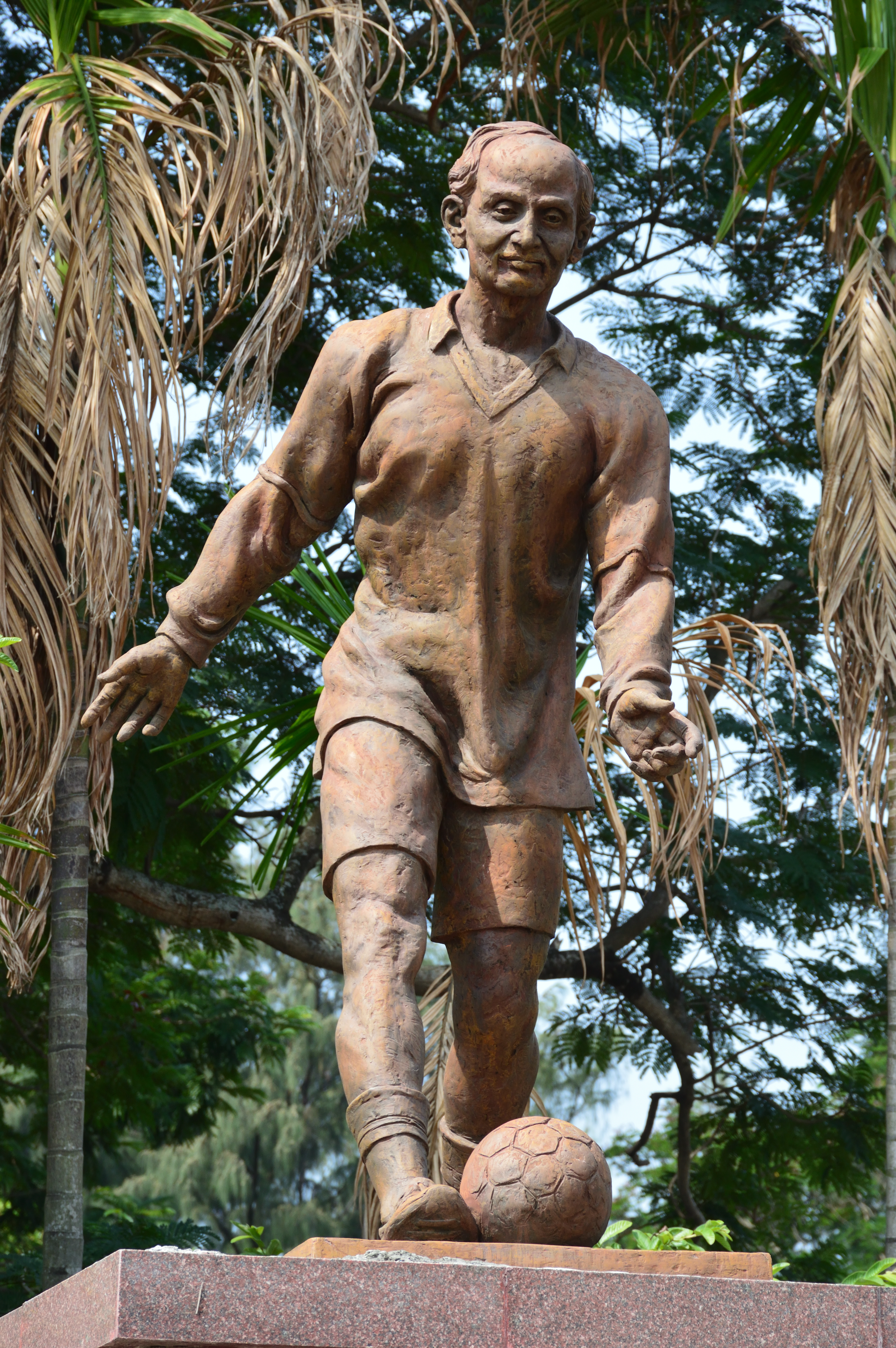
Statue of Sailen Manna, who was awarded the inaugural Mohun Bagan Ratna.

Year	Recipient	Ref
2001	Sailen Manna	
2002	Dr. Talimeran Ao	
2003	Shibdas Bhaduri	
2004	Gostha Paul	
2005	Chuni Goswami	
2006	Umapati Kumar	
2007	Dhiren Dey	
2008	Mohammad Abdus Sattar	
2009	Samar Banerjee	
2010	Hiralal Mukherjee, Bhuti Sukul, Sudhir Kumar Chatterjee, Monmohan Mukherjee, Rajen Sengupta, Neelmadhav Bhattacharya, Kanu Roy, Habul Sarkar, Abhilash Ghosh, Bijoydas Bhaduri	
2011	Pradip Kumar Banerjee	
2012	Jarnail Singh	
2013	Balaidas Chatterjee	
2014	Arumoy Naigam	
2015	Karuna Sankar Bhattacharya	
2016	Syed Nayeemuddin	
2017	Subrata Bhattacharya	
2018	Pradip Chowdhury	
2019	Keshav Dutt, Prasun Banerjee	
2020	Gurbux Singh, Palash Nandy	
2021	Shibaji Banerjee	
2022	Shyam Thapa	
2023	Gautam Sarkar	
2024	Sourav Ganguly	
2025	Swapan Sadhan Bose	

=== Trophy ===
The Mohun Bagan Ratna award is a medallion with the emblem of Mohun Bagan in the center, and along the circumference is etched "Mohun Bagan Athletic Club 1889" and " Mohun Bagan Ratna" with the year of felicitation and the name of the recipient.

== Best footballer of the season ==
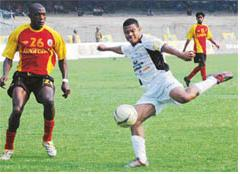
José Barreto (in white) was the recipient of Dhiren Dey Award.

Mohun Bagan presents an award to the best footballer for his performance during the preceding season through a voting among the board of members of the club. The award is named in honour of an eminent personality historically associated with the club, with the inaugural ward being named as Dhiren Dey Award which was conferred to José Barreto in 2001 after which the award was stopped being given due various undisclosed management issues until 2012. Presently the award is named Shibdas Bhaduri Award after 1911 IFA Shield winning captain Shibdas Bhaduri.

Year	Nationality	Recipient	Position	Notes	Ref
2001	Brazil	José Barreto	Forward	Award was named Dhiren Dey Award	
2012	India	Syed Rahim Nabi	Forward	Award was named Karuna Shankar Bhattacharjee Award	
2013	India	Denson Devadas	Midfielder	Award was named Karuna Shankar Bhattacharjee Award	
2014	Japan	Katsumi Yusa	Midfielder	Award was named Karuna Shankar Bhattacharjee Award	
2015	India	Debjit Majumder	Goalkeeper	Award was named Karuna Shankar Bhattacharjee Award	
2016	Haiti	Sony Nordé	Forward	Award was named Karuna Shankar Bhattacharjee Award	
2016	India	Jeje Lalpekhlua	Forward	Award was named Karuna Shankar Bhattacharjee Award	
2017	India	Balwant Singh	Forward	Award was named Karuna Shankar Bhattacharjee Award	
2018	India	Shilton Paul	Goalkeeper	Award was named Karuna Shankar Bhattacharjee Award	
2019	India	Arijit Bagui	Defender	Award was named Karuna Shankar Bhattacharjee Award	
2020	Spain	Joseba Beitia	Midfielder	Award was named Shibdas Bhaduri Award	
2021	Fiji	Roy Krishna	Forward	Award was named Shibdas Bhaduri Award	
2022	India	Liston Colaco	Forward	Award was named Shibdas Bhaduri Award	
2023	India	Vishal Kaith	Goalkeeper	Award was named Shibdas Bhaduri Award	
2024	Australia	Dimitri Petratos	Forward	Award was named Shibdas Bhaduri Award	

== Best cricketer of the year ==
Mohun Bagan presents an award to the best cricketer for his performance for the club in CAB organised tournaments during the previous season decided by the votes of the management board. The inaugural award was named Dhiren Dey Memorial Award and was given to Debabrata Das in 2012. Presently the award is named as Arun Lal Award in honour of former Test cricketer Arun Lal.

Year	Recipient	Role	Ref
2012	Debabrata Das	Batter	
2013	Subhomoy Das	Batter	
2014	Not awarded due to no recognizable performance		
2015	Jayojit Basu	Batter	
2016	Wriddhiman Saha	Wicket-keeper	
2017	Debabrata Das	Batter	
2018	Sudip Chatterjee	Batter	
2019	Rajkumar Paul	Batter	
2020	Not awarded due to COVID-19 pandemic		
2021	Abhimanyu Easwaran	Batter	
2022	Prinann Dutta	Batter	
2023	Arnab Nandi	All-rounder	
2024	Avilin Ghosh	Batter	

== Other award winners ==
Year	Best sportsperson	Best young footballer	Best forward (Subhash Bhowmick Award)	Best athlete (Pranab Banerjee Award)	Best hockey player	Best supporter	Best sports official (Anjan Mitra Award)	Best sports journalist (Moti Nandi Award)	Best referee (Pramod Chakraborty Award)
2012	Laxmi Ratan Shukla								
2013	Asha Roy								
2015		Romario Angelo Topno, Pintu Mahata, Sougata Hansda							
2016		Not awarded							
2017		Deep Saha		Lili Das					
2018		Sourav Das		Not awarded					
2019		U19 Zee Bangla Football League winning team		Tapas Dey					
2020		Sajal Bag		Not awarded			Joydeep Mukherjee		
2021		Not awarded		Bidisha Kundu			Not awarded		
2022		Not awarded	Kiyan Nassiri	Not awarded			V. C. Praveen	Ashok Dasgupta	
2023		Ningomba Engson Singh	Dimitri Petratos	Mohor Mukherjee	Nitish Neupane	Shanti Chakraborty, Kamalesh Upadhyay	Siddhartha 'Nabab' Bhattacharya	Jayanto Chakraborty	
2024		Suhail Bhat	Manvir Singh	Karunamoy Mahato	Sourabh Pahine	Bapi Maji, Ajoy Pasawan	Sourav Pal	Debashish Datta	Dilip Sen

=== Lifetime achievement award ===
Year	Recipient
2019	Ashok Chatterjee
2020	Ashok Kumar, Pranab Ganguly, Manoranjan Porel
2022	Balai Dey
2023	Shankar Banerjee
2024	Bimal Mukherjee
