= Shome =

Origin
- Origin: Bengali Hindu
- Region of origin: Bengal

Shome or Som (Bengali: সোম) is a native Bengali surname commonly used by the Bengali Hindus of Indian states of West Bengal, Assam and Tripura and as well as in Bangladesh. It is mainly used by the Bengali Kayastha community.

== Notable people with the surname ==
- Chitra Singh (born 1945), born Shome, Indian ghazal singer, also known as Chitra Dutta
- Gautam Shome Sr. (born 1960), Indian cricketer
- Gautam Shome Jr. (born 1963), Indian cricketer
- Mihir Kanti Shome, Indian politician
- Pratibha Basu (1915–2006), born Shome, Bengali writer, also known as Ranu Shome
- Shamit Shome (born 1997), Canadian soccer player
- Sumit Shome (born 1955), Indian cricketer
- Sunit Shome (born 1932), Indian cricketer
- Tillotama Shome, Indian actress
- Title character of Bhuvan Shome

== See also ==
- Shome Panel, Indian government committee
