= Kundu =

Kundu may refer to:

== People ==
- Agripina Kundu (born 1993), Kenyan volleyball player
- Nitun Kundu (1935–2006), Bangladeshi artist, sculptor and entrepreneur

=== Indians ===
- Gopal Kundu (born 1959), renowned cell and cancer biologist
- Ritam Kundu (born 1983), former cricketer
- Sampat Prakash Kundu (1937 – 2023), Kashmiri nationalist and communist leader
- Soumendranath Kundu (1942 – 2019), cricketer
- Soumitrisha Kundu (born 2000), actress
- Suman Kundu, wrestler

== Other ==
- Equatorial Kundu, a fictional African nation in the TV series The West Wing and The Newsroom
- Kundu (drum), an hourglass shaped drum used to accompany formal occasions
- Kundu (surname), a common Bengali Hindu surname found in India and Bangladesh
- Kundu equation, a general form of integrable system that is gauge-equivalent to the mixed nonlinear Schrödinger equation
- Kundu River, a tributary of the Penna River in the Rayalaseema region of Andhra Pradesh, India
