= Soumen =

Soumen may refer to:

== Food ==
- Sōmen, thin wheat noodles in Japanese/East Asian cuisines

== People ==
- Soumen Basak, Indian immunologist and virologist
- Soumen Chakrabarti, Indian computer scientist and professor
- Soumen Karmarkar (born 1973), Indian cricketer
- Soumen Mitra (born 1961), Indian police administrator
- Soumen Singh (born 1975), Indian cricketer
