= Mustafi =

Mustafi is a surname. Notable people with the surname include:

Cricketers

- Sisir Mustafi (born 1920), played for Bengal 1941–1950
- Ashoke Mustafi (born 1933), played for Bengal 1958/59

Footballers

- Nebi Mustafi (born 1976), Albanian–Macedonian, has played for various clubs, and for the Republic of Macedonia
- Nuri Mustafi (born 1983), Macedonian, plays for Brønshøj BK (Denmark)
- Orhan Mustafi (born 1990), Macedonian, plays for FC Le Mont (Switzerland)
- Shkodran Mustafi (born 1992), German, plays for Levante UD and formerly for the Germany national football team.
