= Tamplin (surname) =

Tamplin is a surname. Notable people with the surname include:

- Bill Tamplin (1917–1989), Welsh rugby union player
- Cliff Tamplin (1920–2006), Welsh cricketer
- Glenn Tamplin (born 1972), English businessman and football club chairman
- Henry Tamplin (1801–1867), English businessman
- Robin Tamplin (1928–2017), Irish rower
- Tessa Tamplin (born 2001), Australian soccer player

== See also ==
- Tamplin v James, English contract law case
