= Nemai Ghosh =

Nemai Ghosh is the name of:

- Nemai Ghosh (cricketer) (born 1939), Indian cricketer
- Nemai Ghosh (director) (1914–1988), Indian film director and cinematographer
- Nemai Ghosh (photographer) (1934–2020), Indian photographer most known for working with Satyajit Ray
- Nemai Ghosh (actor), Indian film actor in Bengali cinema, Kaal (2007)
