= Dipankar Ghosh =

Dipankar Ghosh may refer to:

- Dipankar Ghosh (cricketer)
- Dipankar Ghosh (mountaineer)
