= Sunil Gupta =

Sunil Gupta may refer to:

- Sunil Kumar Gupta (1914–2009), Jatiya Party (Ershad) politician
- Sunil Gupta (photographer) (born 1953), Indian-born Canadian photographer
- Sunil Das Gupta (died 2004), Indian cricketer
- Sunil Gupta, a former jailer at Tihar Prisons, who co-wrote the book Black Warrant
