= Mantu =

Mantu may refer to

- Mantu (Afghan cuisine), an Afghan dumpling derived from Turkic cuisine
- Mantu Sen (1923–1990), Indian cricketer
- Lucia Mantu (pen name of Camelia Nădejde; 1888–1971), Romanian writer
- Manțu, a Romanian village in Tătărăni commune

== See also ==
- Mantou, a Chinese steamed bun
