= Amit Banerjee =

Amit Banerjee may refer to:

- Amit Banerjee (academic), Indian surgeon and academic administrator
- Amit Banerjee (cricketer) (born 1987), Indian cricketer
