= 1971–72 Ranji Trophy =

- The Ranji Trophy, which the winners get.
- Administrator(s): BCCI
- Cricket format: First-class cricket
- Tournament format(s): League and knockout
- Champions: Bombay (23rd title)
- Participants: 22
- Most runs: Chetan Chauhan (Maharashtra) (540)
- Most wickets: Padmakar Shivalkar (Bombay) (41)

The 1971–72 Ranji Trophy was the 38th season of the Ranji Trophy. Bombay won their 14th title in a row defeating Bengal in the final.

== Highlights ==
- Bengal was captained in the final by former Indian football captain Chuni Goswami.

== Group stage ==
=== East Zone ===
Team	Pld	W	L	D	T	NR	Pts	Q
Bengal	3	2	0	1	0	0	21	1.668
Bihar	3	2	0	1	0	0	20	1.905
Orissa	3	0	2	1	0	0	5	0.732
Assam	3	0	2	1	0	0	3	0.377

=== South Zone ===
Team	Pld	W	L	D	T	NR	Pts	Q
Hyderabad	4	3	0	1	0	0	30	1.662
Mysore	4	2	0	2	0	0	24	1.478
Tamil Nadu	4	2	1	1	0	0	22	1.850
Kerala	4	1	3	0	0	0	8	0.469
Andhra	4	0	4	0	0	0	0	0.485

=== North Zone ===
Team	Pld	W	L	D	T	NR	Pts	Q
Punjab	3	0	0	3	0	0	16	1.075
Railways	3	1	0	2	0	0	15	1.898
Delhi	3	1	0	2	0	0	15	1.414
Haryana	3	0	2	1	0	0	3	0.343

=== Central Zone ===
Team	Pld	W	L	D	T	NR	Pts	Q
Madhya Pradesh	3	2	0	1	0	0	19	1.297
Rajasthan	3	2	1	1	0	0	16	1.169
Uttar Pradesh	3	0	1	1	0	0	10	0.936
Vidarbha	3	0	2	1	0	0	3	0.669

=== West Zone ===
Team	Pld	W	L	D	T	NR	Pts	Q
Bombay	4	3	0	1	0	0	31	2.577
Maharashtra	4	2	0	2	0	0	24	1.882
Baroda	4	1	2	1	0	0	11	0.811
Gujarat	4	0	2	2	0	0	8	0.555
Saurashtra	4	0	2	2	0	0	6	0.513

== Knockout stage ==
Pre-Quarter-finals
10 Mar 1972 – Jamshedpur
Bihar (T)	379
Railways	338/4
18 Mar 1972 – Jullender
Punjab	437/4d
Madhya Pradesh	141 & 224/6

Quarter-finals
17 Mar 1972 – Bombay
Bombay	504
Bihar	171 & 320
17 Mar 1972 – Bangalore
Mysore	223 & 328
Rajasthan	114 & 123
18 Mar 1972 – Calcutta
Bengal	328 & 34/2
Maharashtra	136 & 225
31 Mar 1972 – Jullender
Punjab	161 & 256
Hyderabad	476

Semi-finals
31 Mar 1972 – Bombay
Bombay	257 & 316/8
Mysore	90 & 111
7 Apr 1972 – Calcutta
Bengal	290 & 98/1
Hyderabad	183 & 201/6d

Finals
21 Apr 1972 – Bombay
Bombay	377 & 254
Bengal	279 & 106

(T) – Advanced to next round by spin of coin.

=== Final ===
21–26 April 1972
Scorecard

Bombay (H)	v	Bengal
377 (135.2 overs); Sunil Gavaskar 157; Subroto Guha 3/77		279 (119.2 overs); Ashok Gandotra 92; Padmakar Shivalkar 3/75
254 (83.5 overs); Ashok Mankad 98; Dilip Doshi 3/73		106 (38.4 overs); Kalyan Chowdhury 20; Padmakar Shivalkar 6/43

Bombay won by 246 runs
Brabourne Stadium, Bombay
Umpires: B. Satyaji Rao and M. V. Nagendra

- Bombay won the toss and decided to bat

== Scorecards and averages ==
- CricketArchive
