= Kalyan Ghosh =

Kalyan Ghosh may refer to:

- Kalyan Ghosh (cricketer)
- Kalyan Ghosh (politician)
