= Jiban Ghosh =

Jiban Ghosh can refer to:

- Jiban Ghosh (cricketer) (born 1946), an Indian cricketer
- Jiban Ghosh (umpire) (1935–2004), an Indian cricket umpire
