= Robert Gourlay =

Robert Gourlay may refer to:

- Robert Fleming Gourlay (1778–1863), Scottish-Canadian writer, political reform activist, and agriculturalist
- Robert Gourlay (bowls), Hong Kong lawn bowler
- Robert Gourlay (cricketer) (1904–1951), Scottish cricketer
- Robert Gourlay (merchant) 16th-century Edinburgh merchant
