= Sujit Bose =

Sujit Bose may refer to:

- Sujit Bose (cricketer)
- Sujit Bose (politician)
