= Ratnadeep =

Ratandeep may refer to:

- Ratnadeep Adivrekar (born 1974), contemporary artist from India
- Ranadeep Moitra (born 1968), Indian cricketer
- Ratnadeep (1953 film), a 1953 Hindi and Bengali bi-lingual film directed by Debaki Bose
- Ratnadeep (1979 film), a 1979 Hindi film directed by directed by Basu Chatterjee
