= Kundu (surname) =

Family name

Origin
- Origin: Bengali Hindu
- Region of origin: Bengal

Kundu is a surname. The surname is mainly found among the Bengali Hindus and some other communities of India.

== History ==
The surname Kundu is primarily found in Bengal among Teli (oil pressing caste), Tili and Bengali Kayasthas. Historian Tej Ram Sharma mentions that the surname is "now confined to Kayasthas of Bengal" while referring to the names of Brahmins ending in such Kayastha surnames in the early inscriptions dating back to the Gupta period.

According to GK Ghosh, the surname Kundu or Kunda might have been derived from the bowl of Ghani or Ghana, known as Kundu or Kunda. Some of the surnames among Telis were originated from the raw materials or implements they use.

Kundu is also a Sikh surname based on a Jat clan.

== Notables ==
- Agripina Kundu, Kenyan Olympian
- Annette Kundu, Kenyan footballer
- Arup Kumar Kundu, Indian rheumatologist
- Balraj Kundu, Indian politician
- Gopal Kundu, Indian scientist
- Mukul Kundu, Indian solar physicist
- Nitun Kundu, Bangladeshi artist, sculptor and entrepreneur
- Pran Govinda Kundu, Bangladeshi footballer
- Ritam Kundu, Indian cricketer
- Samarendra Kundu, Indian politician
- Sampat Prakash Kundu, Kashmiri nationalist
- Shinjini Kundu, American physician and computer scientist
- Soumendranath Kundu, Indian cricketer
- Soumitrisha Kundu, Indian actress
- Suman Kundu, Indian wrestler
- Tapas Kumar Kundu, Indian molecular biologist
- Tinu Kundu, Indian cricketer
