= Montu Banerjee =

Indian cricketer (1919–1992)

Personal information
- Full name: Sudangsu Abinash Banerjee
- Born: 1 November 1919; Calcutta, British India
- Died: 14 September 1992 (aged 72); Kolkata, West Bengal, India
- Batting: Right-handed
- Bowling: Right-arm medium

International information
- National side: India
- Only Test (cap 48): 31 December 1948 v West Indies

Career statistics
Competition	Test	First-class
Matches	1	26
Runs scored	–	232
Batting average	–	7.03
100s/50s	–	0/0
Top score	–	31
Balls bowled	306	5,062
Wickets	5	92
Bowling average	36.20	23.28
5 wickets in innings	0	5
10 wickets in match	0	1
Best bowling	4/120	7/50
Catches/stumpings	3/–	13/–
- Source: ESPNcricinfo, 20 November 2022

Sudangsu Abinash "Montu" Banerjee (1 November 1919 – 14 September 1992) was an Indian cricketer who played in one Test match in 1948 against West Indies. Montu played for Bengal 1941/42 to 1953/54. He was a right-handed batter and bowled medium pace, right arm. His son was Rabi Banerjee who also played for Bengal.

== See also ==
- One Test Wonder
