= T. V. Parthasarathi =

Indian cricketer (1916–1988)

Personal information
- Born: 11 November 1916
- Died: 5 December 1988 (aged 72); Madras, India
- Source: Cricinfo, 31 March 2016

T. V. Parthasarathi (11 November 1916 – 5 December 1988) was an Indian cricketer. He played first-class cricket for Bengal, Madras and Mysore.

== See also ==
- List of Bengal cricketers
