= Shivaji Roy =

Indian cricketer (born 1943)

Personal information
- Born: 28 May 1943 (age 83); Purnia, India
- Source: Cricinfo, 1 April 2016

Shivaji Roy (born 28 May 1943) is an Indian former cricketer. He played three first-class matches for Bengal between 1964 and 1969.

== See also ==
- List of Bengal cricketers
