= Sanjit Sil =

Indian cricketer (born 1944)

Personal information
- Born: 3 October 1944 (age 82); Chinsurah, India
- Source: Cricinfo, 2 April 2016

Sanjit Sil (born 3 October 1944) is an Indian former cricketer. He played one first-class match for Bengal in 1963/64.

== See also ==
- List of Bengal cricketers
