= Jyotish Mitter =

Indian cricketer (1926–1971)

Personal information
- Born: April 1926; Calcutta, British India
- Died: 29 June 1971; Barasat, India
- Source: ESPNcricinfo, 6 September 2016

Jyotish Mitter (April 1926 – 29 June 1971) was an Indian cricketer. He played six first-class matches for Bengal between 1950 and 1959.

== See also ==
- List of Bengal cricketers
