= Sanjit Roy (cricketer) =

Indian cricketer (1928–2009)

Personal information
- Born: 6 November 1928; Calcutta, India
- Died: 23 November 2009 (aged 81)
- Source: Cricinfo, 1 April 2016

Sanjit Roy (6 November 1928 – 23 November 2009) was an Indian cricketer. He played three first-class matches for Bengal between 1950 and 1952. Roy died on 23 November 2009, at the age of 81.

== See also ==
- List of Bengal cricketers
