= Nilamber Saha =

Indian cricketer (born 1973)

Personal information
- Born: 18 May 1973 (age 53); Calcutta, India
- Source: ESPNcricinfo, 2 April 2016

Nilamber Saha (born 18 May 1973) is an Indian former cricketer. He played two first-class matches for Bengal between 1998 and 2000.

== See also ==
- List of Bengal cricketers
