= Edward Harvey-Johnston =

English cricketer

Personal information
- Full name: Edward Campbell Harvey-Johnston
- Born: 16 September 1912; Peshawar, British India
- Died: 1971 (aged 58–59); Hounslow, Middlesex, England
- Source: ESPNcricinfo, 28 March 2016

Edward Harvey-Johnston (16 September 1912 – 1971) was an English cricketer. He played four first-class matches for Bengal between 1942 and 1944.

== See also ==
- List of Bengal cricketers
