= Rash Sarkar =

Indian cricketer (born 1944)

Personal information
- Born: 22 December 1944 (age 81); Calcutta, India
- Source: Cricinfo, 1 April 2016

Rash Sarkar (born 22 December 1944) is an Indian former cricketer. He played two first-class matches for Bengal in 1966/67.

== See also ==
- List of Bengal cricketers
