= Partha Sen (cricketer) =

Indian cricketer (born 1956)

Personal information
- Born: 3 September 1956 (age 70); Jamshedpur, India
- Source: Cricinfo, 2 April 2016

Partha Sen (born 3 September 1956) is an Indian former cricketer. He played three first-class matches for Bengal in 1983/84.

== See also ==
- List of Bengal cricketers
