= Murthy Rajan =

Indian cricketer (born 1944)

Personal information
- Born: 28 August 1944 (age 82); Nagpur, India
- Source: ESPNcricinfo, 1 April 2016

Murthy Rajan (born 28 August 1944) is an Indian former cricketer. He played in 44 first-class matches for Bengal and Vidarbha between 1962/63 and 1975/76.

== See also ==
- List of Bengal cricketers
