= Satyendra Singh =

Indian cricketer (born 1964)

Personal information
- Born: 7 March 1964 (age 62); Patna, Bihar, India
- Source: Cricinfo, 3 April 2016

Satyendra Singh (born 7 March 1964) is an Indian former cricketer. He played nineteen first-class matches for Bengal between 1986 and 1991.

== See also ==
- List of Bengal cricketers
