= Gour Ghosh =

Indian cricketer (1939–2017)

Personal information
- Born: 17 November 1939; Calcutta, British India
- Died: 8 July 2017 (aged 77)
- Source: ESPNcricinfo, 28 March 2016

Gour Ghosh (17 November 1939 – 8 July 2017) was an Indian cricketer. He played first-class cricket for Bengal and Jharkhand.

== See also ==
- List of Bengal cricketers
