= Sushil Bose =

Indian cricketer (1911–1989)

Personal information
- Born: 22 December 1911; Calcutta, British India
- Died: 6 February 1989 (aged 77); Calcutta, India
- Source: Cricinfo, 25 March 2016

Sushil Bose (22 December 1911 – 6 February 1989) was an Indian cricketer. He played fifteen first-class matches for Bengal between 1935 and 1949.

== See also ==
- List of Bengal cricketers
