= Ramesh Bhatia =

Indian cricketer (born 1940)

Personal information
- Born: 4 July 1940 (age 86); Dera Ismail Khan, North-West Frontier Province, British India
- Source: Cricinfo, 25 March 2016

Ramesh Bhatia (born 4 July 1940) is an Indian former cricketer. He played eighteen first-class matches for Bengal between 1961 and 1972.

== See also ==
- List of Bengal cricketers
