= Prabir Acharya =

Indian cricketer (born 1961)

Personal information
- Born: 3 November 1961 (age 65); Calcutta, India
- Source: Cricinfo, 24 March 2016

Prabir Acharya (born 3 November 1961) is an Indian former cricketer. He played two first-class matches for Bengal in 1995/96.

== See also ==
- List of Bengal cricketers
