= Prolay Chail =

Indian cricketer (born 1951)

Personal information
- Born: 1 November 1951 (age 75); Calcutta, India
- Source: Cricinfo, 26 March 2016

Prolay Chail (born 1 November 1951) is an Indian former cricketer. He played eight first-class matches for Bengal between 1967 and 1976.

== See also ==
- List of Bengal cricketers
