= Sankar Bhattacharjee =

Indian cricketer (born 1963)

Personal information
- Born: 20 December 1963 (age 62); Dehradun, India
- Source: Cricinfo, 25 March 2016

Sankar Bhattacharjee (born 20 December 1963) is an Indian former cricketer. He played one first-class match for Bengal in 1986/87.

== See also ==
- List of Bengal cricketers
