= Parimal Bose =

Indian cricketer (born 1946)

Personal information
- Born: 16 October 1946 (age 80); Sodepur, British India
- Source: Cricinfo, 25 March 2016

Parimal Bose (born 16 October 1946) is an Indian former cricketer. He played one first-class match for Bengal in 1962/63.

== See also ==
- List of Bengal cricketers
