= Jyoti Dutta =

Indian cricketer (1926–2010)

Personal information
- Born: 26 April 1926; Calcutta, British India
- Died: 7 January 2010 (aged 83)
- Source: ESPNcricinfo, 27 March 2016

Jyoti Dutta (26 April 1926 – 7 January 2010) was an Indian cricketer. He played two first-class matches for Bengal in 1958/59.

== See also ==
- List of Bengal cricketers
