= Sailesh Dutt =

Indian cricketer

Personal information
- Born: 1911
- Source: Cricinfo, 27 March 2016

Sailesh Dutt (born 1911) was an Indian cricketer. He played seven first-class matches for Bengal between 1938 and 1944.

== See also ==
- List of Bengal cricketers
