= Wrichik Majumder =

Indian cricketer (born 1979)

Personal information
- Full name: Wrichik Pabirakumar Majumder
- Born: 11 November 1979 (age 47); Calcutta, India
- Source: Cricinfo, 29 March 2016

Wrichik Majumder (born 11 November 1979) is an Indian former cricketer. He played fifteen first-class matches for Bengal between 1998 and 2001.

== See also ==
- List of Bengal cricketers
