= Nripesh Biswas =

Indian cricketer (born 1937)

Personal information
- Born: 9 April 1937 (age 89); Calcutta, British India
- Source: ESPNcricinfo, 25 March 2016

Nripesh Biswas (born 9 April 1937) is an Indian former cricketer. He played two first-class matches for Bengal in 1963/64.

== See also ==
- List of Bengal cricketers
