= Shyam Mitra =

Indian cricketer (1936–2019)

Personal information
- Full name: Shyam Sundar Mitra
- Born: 8 November 1936; Calcutta, British India
- Died: 27 June 2019 (aged 82); Kolkata, India
- Source: Cricinfo, 30 March 2016

Shyam Mitra (8 November 1936 – 27 June 2019) was an Indian cricketer. He played 59 first-class matches for Bengal between 1958 and 1972.

== See also ==
- List of Bengal cricketers
