= Probal Ghosh =

Indian cricketer (born 1958)

Personal information
- Born: 21 June 1958 (age 68); Calcutta, India
- Source: Cricinfo, 28 March 2016

Probal Ghosh (born 21 June 1958) is an Indian former cricketer. He played seven first-class matches for Bengal between 1979 and 1985.

== See also ==
- List of Bengal cricketers
