= Desmond Whittaker =

Indian cricketer (1925–1966)

Personal information
- Full name: Desmond Terence Patrick Whittaker
- Born: 9 September 1925; Rangoon, Burma, British India
- Died: 1966 (aged 40–41); Hamburg, Germany
- Source: ESPNcricinfo, 3 April 2016

Desmond Whittaker (9 September 1925 – 1966) was an Indian cricketer. He played one first-class match for Bengal in 1954/55.

== See also ==
- List of Bengal cricketers
