= Sushil Kapoor =

Indian cricketer (born 1939)

Personal information
- Full name: Sushil Kumar Kapoor
- Born: 23 January 1939 (age 87)
- Source: Cricinfo, 28 March 2016

Sushil Kapoor (born 23 January 1939) is an Indian former cricketer. He played first-class cricket for several teams, including Bengal and Jharkhand.

== See also ==
- List of Bengal cricketers
