= Jitender Shaw =

Indian cricketer (born 1993)

Personal information
- Born: 24 December 1993 (age 32); Kolkata, India
- Batting: Left-handed
- Bowling: Slow Left arm orthodox

Domestic team information
- Years: Team
- 2013-14: Bengal
- Source: ESPNcricinfo, 2 April 2016

Jitender Shaw (born 24 December 1993) is an Indian former cricketer. He plays first-class cricket for Bengal.

== See also ==
- List of Bengal cricketers
