= Dharmendra Singh =

Indian cricketer (born 1978)

Personal information
- Born: 2 December 1978 (age 47); Serampore, India
- Source: ESPNcricinfo, 27 March 2016

Dharmendra Singh (born 2 December 1978) is an Indian former cricketer. He played one first-class match for Bengal in 1998/99.

== See also ==
- List of Bengal cricketers
