= Pradeep Pandey (cricketer) =

Indian cricketer (born 1953)

Personal information
- Born: 19 April 1953 (age 73); Calcutta, India
- Source: Cricinfo, 31 March 2016

Pradeep Pandey (born 19 April 1953) is an Indian former cricketer. He played ten first-class matches for Bengal between 1972 and 1984.

== See also ==
- List of Bengal cricketers
