= William Scott (Scottish cricketer) =

Scottish cricketer

Personal information
- Born: 17 June 1908; Gowanbank, Dumfries, Scotland
- Died: 6 November 1971 (aged 63); Colvend, Scotland
- Source: Cricinfo, 3 April 2016

William Scott (17 June 1908 – 6 November 1971) was a Scottish cricketer. He played four first-class matches for Bengal between 1936 and 1938.

== See also ==
- List of Bengal cricketers
