= George Carter (Bengal cricketer) =

English cricketer

Personal information
- Born: 20 August 1908; Brentford, Middlesex, England
- Died: 10 July 1982 (aged 73); Haywards Heath, Sussex, England
- Source: ESPNcricinfo, 26 March 2016

George Carter (20 August 1908 – 10 July 1982) was an English cricketer. He played four first-class matches for Bengal between 1937 and 1939.

== See also ==
- List of Bengal cricketers
