= Subrata Sarkar =

Indian cricketer (1929–2000)

Personal information
- Born: 24 July 1929; Calcutta, India
- Died: 8 February 2000 (aged 70)
- Source: Cricinfo, 2 April 2016

Subrata Sarkar (24 July 1929 – 8 February 2000) was an Indian cricketer. He played one first-class match for Bengal in 1953/54.

== See also ==
- List of Bengal cricketers
