= Samarendra Nath =

Indian cricketer (born 1941)

Personal information
- Born: 6 April 1941 (age 85); Calcutta, British India
- Source: Cricinfo, 31 March 2016

Samarendra Nath (born 6 April 1941) is an Indian former cricketer. He played four first-class matches for Bengal between 1965 and 1968.

== See also ==
- List of Bengal cricketers
