= Leonard Gilbert =

English cricketer

Personal information
- Born: 23 January 1908; Epsom, Surrey, England
- Died: 25 June 1974 (aged 66); Surrey, England
- Source: ESPNcricinfo, 28 March 2016

Leonard Gilbert (23 January 1908 – 25 June 1974) was an English cricketer. He played four first-class matches for Bengal in the Ranji Trophy between 1934 and 1936. He was a right-handed batsman and a right-arm medium-fast bowler.

== Early life and career ==
Gilbert was born in Epsom, Surrey, England. He moved to India in the early 1930s and worked as a manager of a tea estate in Darjeeling. He joined the Calcutta Cricket Club and made his first-class debut for Bengal against Bihar in the 1934-35 Ranji Trophy. He scored 31 and took two wickets in his first match.

Leonard married Nancy Willan on 14 Jan 1938 in Calcutta.

== See also ==
- List of Bengal cricketers
