= Tapan Bhattacharya =

Indian cricketer (born 1949)

Personal information
- Born: 1 November 1949 (age 77); Calcutta, India
- Source: Cricinfo, 25 March 2016

Tapan Bhattacharya (born 1 November 1949) is an Indian former cricketer. He played two first-class matches for Bengal in 1974/75.

== See also ==
- List of Bengal cricketers
