= Prasanta Bhattacharya =

Indian cricketer (born 1927)

Personal information
- Born: 17 August 1927; Calcutta, India
- Source: Cricinfo, 25 March 2016

Prasanta Bhattacharya (born 17 August 1927) is an Indian former cricketer. He played two first-class matches for Bengal between 1958 and 1960.

== See also ==
- List of Bengal cricketers
