= Ram Prasad Ram =

Indian cricketer (born 1936)

Personal information
- Born: 11 December 1936 (age 89); Calcutta, India
- Source: Cricinfo, 1 April 2016

Ram Prasad Ram (born 11 December 1936) is an Indian former cricketer. He played one first-class match for Bengal in 1963/64.

== See also ==
- List of Bengal cricketers
