= Subhojit Paul =

Indian cricketer (born 1984)

Personal information
- Born: 30 December 1984 (age 41); Calcutta, India
- Source: ESPNcricinfo, 1 April 2016

Subhojit Paul (born 30 December 1984) is an Indian former cricketer. He played one first-class match for Bengal in 2006.

== See also ==
- List of Bengal cricketers
