= Sujoy Parui =

Indian cricketer (born 1981)

Personal information
- Born: 20 June 1981 (age 45); Shrirampur, India
- Source: Cricinfo, 1 April 2016

Sujoy Parui (born 20 June 1981) is an Indian former cricketer. He played two first-class matches for Bengal in 2000/01.

== See also ==
- List of Bengal cricketers
