= Dhruba Das =

Indian cricketer (born 1919)

Personal information
- Full name: Dhruba Ranjan Das
- Born: 4 February 1919; Darjeeling, British India
- Source: ESPNcricinfo, 27 March 2016

Dhruba Das (born 4 February 1919, date of death unknown) was an Indian cricketer. He played eleven first-class matches for Bengal between 1941 and 1953. Das is deceased.

== See also ==
- List of Bengal cricketers
