= Soham Ghosh =

Indian cricketer (born 1986)

Personal information
- Full name: Soham Manojkumar Ghosh
- Born: 29 March 1986 (age 40); Baharampur, India
- Source: Cricinfo, 28 March 2016

Soham Ghosh (born 29 March 1986) is an Indian former cricketer. He played three first-class matches for Bengal in 2007/08.

== See also ==
- List of Bengal cricketers
