= Madan Dhar =

Indian cricketer

Personal information
- Born: Madan Gopal Dhar; Calcutta, India
- Died: 1 March 1978; Calcutta, India
- Source: ESPNcricinfo, 6 April 2016

Madan Dhar (date of birth unknown, died 1 March 1978) was an Indian cricketer. He played four first-class matches for Bengal between 1964 and 1966.

== See also ==
- List of Bengal cricketers
