= Surup Guha Thakurta =

Indian cricketer (born 1936)

Personal information
- Born: 27 April 1936 (age 90); Calcutta, British India
- Source: Cricinfo, 28 March 2016

Surup Guha Thakurta (born 27 April 1936) is an Indian former cricketer. He played seven first-class matches for Bengal between 1963 and 1966.

== See also ==
- List of Bengal cricketers
