= Eklak Ahmid =

Indian cricketer (born 1984)

Personal information
- Born: 12 October 1984 (age 42); Kolkata, India
- Source: ESPNcricinfo, 27 March 2016

Eklak Ahmid (born 12 October 1984) is an Indian former cricketer. He played two first-class matches for Bengal between 2005 and 2006.

== See also ==
- List of Bengal cricketers
