= Humza Ferozie =

Indian cricketer (born 1974)

Personal information
- Born: 22 February 1974 (age 52); Calcutta, India
- Source: ESPNcricinfo, 27 March 2016

Humza Ferozie (born 22 February 1974) is an Indian former cricketer. He played thirteen first-class matches for Bengal between 1995 and 2002.

== See also ==
- List of Bengal cricketers
