= Sunil Nandy =

Indian cricketer (born 1935)

Personal information
- Full name: Sunil Kumar Nandy
- Born: 1 February 1935 (age 91); Calcutta, British India
- Source: Cricinfo, 31 March 2016

Sunil Nandy (born 1 February 1935) is an Indian former cricketer. He played one first-class match for Bengal in 1958/59.

== See also ==
- List of Bengal cricketers
