= Shibsagar Singh =

Indian cricketer (born 1979)

Personal information
- Born: 15 September 1979 (age 47); Burdwan, India
- Source: Cricinfo, 3 April 2016

Shibsagar Singh (born 15 September 1979) is an Indian former cricketer. He played 28 first-class matches for Bengal between 1996 and 2010.

== See also ==
- List of Bengal cricketers
