= Keith Sillett =

Australian cricketer

Personal information
- Full name: Keith Henry Sillett
- Born: 8 February 1929; Brisbane, Australia
- Died: 4 May 2010 (aged 81)
- Batting: Right-handed

Domestic team information
- Years: Team
- 1958/59: Bengal
- Source: ESPNcricinfo, 2 April 2016

Keith Henry Sillett (8 February 1929 – 4 May 2010) was an Australian cricketer. He played three first-class matches for Bengal in 1958/59.

== See also ==
- List of Bengal cricketers
