= James Taylor (Scottish cricketer) =

Scottish cricketer (1929–2019)

Personal information
- Full name: James Robert Niven Taylor
- Born: 11 August 1929; Calcutta, India
- Died: 14 July 2019 (aged 89); Toronto, Ontario, Canada
- Source: ESPNcricinfo, 3 April 2016

James Robert Niven Taylor (11 August 1929 – 14 July 2019) was a Scottish cricketer. He played four matches of first-class cricket for Scotland and Bengal between 1949 and 1953.

== See also ==
- List of Bengal cricketers
