= Moinak Sengupta =

Indian cricketer (born 1973)

Personal information
- Born: 30 December 1973 (age 52); Bhagalpur, India
- Source: ESPNcricinfo, 2 April 2016

Moinak Sengupta (born 30 December 1973) is an Indian former cricketer. He played six first-class matches for Bengal between 1995 and 2003.

== See also ==
- List of Bengal cricketers
