= Suvojit Banerjee =

Indian cricketer (1985–2024)

Personal information
- Full name: Suvojit Swapan Banerjee
- Born: 21 March 1985; Calcutta, West Bengal, India
- Died: 23 December 2024 (aged 39); Sonarpur, West Bengal, India
- Nickname: Tukun
- Batting: Right-handed
- Bowling: Right arm Offbreak

Career statistics
Competition	FC	List A
Matches	3	4
Runs scored	106	93
Batting average	26.50	46.50
100s/50s	0/0	0/0
Top score	44	33
Balls bowled	54	–
Wickets	0	–
Bowling average	–	–
5 wickets in innings	–	–
10 wickets in match	–	–
Best bowling	–	–
Catches/stumpings	1	2
- Source: ESPNcricinfo, 10 January 2024

Suvojit Banerjee (21 March 1985 – 23 December 2024) was an Indian cricketer. He played three first-class matches for Bengal in 2014. Banerjee died of a cardiac arrest in Sonarpur, West Bengal, on 23 December 2024, at the age of 39.

== See also ==
- List of Bengal cricketers
