= Asoke Chatterjee =

Indian cricketer (born 1920)

Personal information
- Full name: Asoke Chandra Chatterjee
- Born: 28 February 1920; Calcutta, British India

Domestic team information
- Years: Team
- 1943/44–1947/48: Bengal
- Source: ESPNcricinfo, 26 March 2016

Asoke Chandra Chatterjee (born 28 February 1920, year of death unknown) was an Indian cricketer. He played seven first-class matches for Bengal between 1943 and 1948. Chatterjee is deceased.

== See also ==
- List of Bengal cricketers
