= Pulin Mitra =

Indian cricketer (born 1926)

Personal information
- Born: 15 December 1926; Calcutta, British India
- Source: Cricinfo, 30 March 2016

Pulin Mitra (born 15 December 1926) is an Indian former cricketer. He played one first-class match for Bengal in 1947/48.

== See also ==
- List of Bengal cricketers
