= Kalyan Dhall =

Indian cricketer (born 1960)

Personal information
- Born: 7 September 1960 (age 66); Calcutta, India
- Source: ESPNcricinfo, 27 March 2016

Kalyan Dhall (born 7 September 1960) is an Indian former cricketer. He played four first-class matches for Bengal between 1984 and 1986.

== See also ==
- List of Bengal cricketers
