= Jitendra Singh (cricketer) =

Indian cricketer (born 1965)

Personal information
- Born: 12 October 1965 (age 61); Varanasi, India
- Source: ESPNcricinfo, 6 April 2016

Jitendra Singh (born 12 October 1965) is an Indian former cricketer. He played one first-class match for Bengal in 1987/88.

== See also ==
- List of Bengal cricketers
