= Abdul Jabbar (Bengal cricketer) =

Indian cricketer (born 1919)

Personal information
- Born: 31 January 1919
- Source: ESPNcricinfo, 6 April 2016

Abdul Jabbar (31 January 1919 – unknown) was an Indian cricketer who represented Bengal in first-class cricket before Indian independence. He played seventeen first-class matches for Bengal between 1937 and 1945, including Ranji Trophy matches. Abdul Jabbar is deceased.

== See also ==
- List of Bengal cricketers
