= Louis Hunt (cricketer) =

English cricketer

Personal information
- Full name: Louis Edward Hunt
- Born: 9 November 1908; Prestatyn, Wales
- Died: 2002 (aged 93–94); England
- Source: ESPNcricinfo, 28 March 2016

Louis Hunt (9 November 1908 – 2002) was an English cricketer. He played first-class cricket for Bengal and Cambridge University.

== See also ==
- List of Bengal cricketers
- List of Cambridge University Cricket Club players
