= Madan Ghosh =

Indian cricketer (born 1956)

Personal information
- Born: 21 May 1956 (age 70); Calcutta, India
- Source: ESPNcricinfo, 28 March 2016

Madan Ghosh (born 21 May 1956) is an Indian former cricketer. He played fourteen first-class matches for Bengal, between 1977 and 1984.

== See also ==
- List of Bengal cricketers
