= Suprakash Som =

Indian cricketer (1947–2008)

Personal information
- Born: 26 October 1947; Calcutta, India
- Died: 30 May 2008 (aged 60)
- Source: Cricinfo, 2 April 2016

Suprakash Som (26 October 1947 – 30 May 2008) was an Indian cricketer. He played two first-class matches for Bengal in 1965/66.

== See also ==
- List of Bengal cricketers
