= Subhradeep Ganguly =

Indian cricketer (born 1980)

Personal information
- Full name: Subhradeep Debidas Ganguly
- Born: 25 October 1980 (age 46); Calcutta, India
- Source: Cricinfo, 27 March 2016

Subhradeep Ganguly (born 25 October 1980) is an Indian former cricketer. He played two first-class matches and one List A match for Bengal in 2002/03. He batted without major success and did not bowl.

== See also ==
- List of Bengal cricketers
