= Jack Bedwell =

English cricketer

Personal information
- Born: 9 July 1915; Royston, Hertfordshire, England
- Died: 11 March 1988 (aged 72); Donhead St Andrew, Wiltshire, England
- Source: ESPNcricinfo, 25 March 2016

Jack Bedwell (9 July 1915 – 11 March 1988) was an English cricketer. He played one first-class match for Bengal in 1940/41.

== See also ==
- List of Bengal cricketers
