= Prasenjit Ganguly =

Indian cricketer (born 1976)

Personal information
- Born: 20 April 1976 (age 50); Chinsurah, India
- Source: Cricinfo, 27 March 2016

Prasenjit Ganguly (born 20 April 1976) is an Indian former cricketer. He played three first-class matches for Bengal between 1996 and 1998.

== See also ==
- List of Bengal cricketers
