= Jyotish Das =

Indian cricketer (born 1973)

Personal information
- Born: 6 January 1973 (age 53); Hugli, India
- Source: ESPNcricinfo, 27 March 2016

Jyotish Das (born 6 January 1973) is an Indian former cricketer. He played one first-class match for Bengal in 1999/00.

== See also ==
- List of Bengal cricketers
