= Ardhendu Das =

Indian cricketer (1910–2007)

Personal information
- Full name: Ardhendu Kumar Das
- Born: 17 July 1910; Sylhet, Eastern Bengal and Assam, British India (now in Bangladesh)
- Died: 26 April 2007 (aged 96); Kolkata, India
- Role: Wicket-keeper
- Source: ESPNcricinfo, 27 March 2016

Ardhendu Das (17 July 1910 – 26 April 2007) was an Indian cricketer. He played five first-class matches for Bengal between 1934 and 1942.

== See also ==
- List of Bengal cricketers
