= Suhrid Mitra =

Indian cricketer (1921–1993)

Personal information
- Born: 23 November 1921; Calcutta, British India
- Died: 24 February 1993 (aged 71); Calcutta, India
- Source: Cricinfo, 30 March 2016

Suhrid Mitra (23 November 1921 – 24 February 1993) was an Indian cricketer. He played four first-class matches for Bengal between 1939 and 1945.

== See also ==
- List of Bengal cricketers
