= Saumya Pakray =

Indian cricketer (born 1989)

Personal information
- Full name: Saumya Lakshminarayan Pakray
- Born: 18 March 1989 (age 37); Tribeni, Hooghly, Bengal, India
- Batting: Left-handed
- Bowling: Off break
- Role: Bowler

Domestic team information
- Years: Team
- 2009/10: Bengal
- Source: Cricket Archive, 20 November 2023

Saumya Lakshminarayan Pakray (born 18 March 1989) is an Indian former cricketer from Tribeni, Hooghly. He played as a right-arm off break bowler and batted left-handed. Pakray played in two List A matches for Bengal in 2009/10.

== See also ==
- List of Bengal cricketers
