= Dilip Dutta =

Indian cricketer (born 1949)

Personal information
- Born: 29 September 1949 (age 77); Calcutta, India
- Source: ESPNcricinfo, 27 March 2016

Dilip Dutta (born 29 September 1949) is an Indian former cricketer. He played one first-class match for Bengal in 1976/77.

== See also ==
- List of Bengal cricketers
