= Gopal Chakraborty =

Indian cricketer (born 1936)

Personal information
- Born: 1 September 1936 (age 90); Calcutta, British India
- Source: ESPNcricinfo, 26 March 2016

Gopal Chakraborty (born 1 September 1936) is an Indian former cricketer. He played seven first-class matches for Bengal between 1954 and 1964.

== See also ==
- List of Bengal cricketers
