= Subir Dey =

Indian cricketer (born 1959)

Personal information
- Born: 27 September 1959 (age 67); Calcutta, India
- Source: Cricinfo, 27 March 2016

Subir Dey (born 27 September 1959) is an Indian former cricketer. He played six first-class matches for Bengal between 1986 and 1996.

== See also ==
- List of Bengal cricketers
