= Tapash Roy =

Indian cricketer (born 1941)

Personal information
- Born: 6 October 1941 (age 85); Mymensingh, Bengal Province, British India
- Source: Cricinfo, 1 April 2016 (age 10)

Tapash Roy (born 6 October 1941) is an Indian former cricketer. He played eight first-class matches for Bengal between 1962 and 1967.

== See also ==
- List of Bengal cricketers
