= Madhukar Sathe =

Indian cricketer (born 1934)

Personal information
- Born: 30 August 1934 (age 92); Wardha, India
- Source: ESPNcricinfo, 3 April 2016

Madhukar Sathe (born 30 August 1934) is an Indian former cricketer. He played first-class cricket for Bengal, Madhya Pradesh and Vidarbha.

== See also ==
- List of Bengal cricketers
