= Patrick Miller (cricketer) =

English cricketer

Personal information
- Full name: Patrick Noel Miller
- Born: 12 September 1907; Siam
- Died: 2 December 1993 (aged 86); Aldringham, Suffolk, England
- Source: Cricinfo, 29 March 2016

Patrick Miller (21 September 1907 – 2 December 1993) was an English cricketer. He played first-class cricket for Bengal, Europeans and Madras.

== See also ==
- List of Bengal cricketers
