= Kalyan Biswas =

Indian cricketer (born 1937)

Personal information
- Full name: Kalyan Kumar Biswas
- Born: 3 February 1937 (age 89); Calcutta, British India
- Source: ESPNcricinfo, 25 March 2016

Kalyan Biswas (born 3 February 1937) is an Indian former cricketer. He played seven first-class matches for Bengal between 1955 and 1962.

== See also ==
- List of Bengal cricketers
