= Alexander Garbis =

English cricketer (1921–1999)

Personal information
- Full name: Alexander Spiro Garbis
- Born: 3 January 1921; Calcutta, British India
- Died: May 1999; Thanet, England
- Source: ESPNcricinfo, 27 March 2016

Alexander Garbis (3 January 1921 – May 1999) was an Indian cricketer. He played three first-class matches for Bengal between 1946 and 1948.

Garbis died in Thanet, England in May 1999 at the age of 78.

== See also ==
- List of Bengal cricketers
