= Frederick Eccleston =

Australian cricketer

Personal information
- Born: 3 March 1905; Lucknow, British India
- Died: 10 November 1988 (aged 83); Perth, Australia
- Source: ESPNcricinfo, 27 March 2016

Frederick Eccleston (3 March 1905 – 10 November 1988) was an Australian cricketer. He played two first-class matches for Bengal between 1939 and 1946.

== See also ==
- List of Bengal cricketers
