= Kinkar Daw =

Indian cricketer (born 1940)

Kinkar Daw (born 4 September 1940) is an Indian cricketer. He was a right-handed batsman and a right-arm medium-pace bowler who played for Bengal. He was born in Calcutta.

Daw made a single first-class appearance, during the 1958-59 Ranji Trophy competition, against Orissa. Daw scored 4 runs in the only innings in which he batted.

Daw's uncle, Probodh Dutt, played for Bengal between 1936 and 1944.
