= Murtaza Lodhgar =

Indian cricketer (1976–2021)

Personal information
- Full name: Murtaza Yakubbhai Lodhgar
- Born: 5 May 1976; Sidhpur, India
- Died: 17 September 2021 (aged 45); Visakhapatnam, India
- Source: ESPNcricinfo, 28 March 2016

Murtaza Lodhgar (5 May 1976 – 17 September 2021) was an Indian cricketer. He played ten first-class matches for Bengal between 1997 and 2007. He died of cardiac arrest.

== See also ==
- List of Bengal cricketers
