= Protiva Bose =

Indian writer (1915–2006)

- Born: Ranu Shome; 13 March 1915 near Dacca, Bengal Presidency, British India (now Dhaka, Bangladesh)
- Died: 13 October 2006 (aged 91); Kolkata, West Bengal, India
- Children: 4
- Writing career
- Pen name: Pratibha Basu

Protiva Bose (also spelled Pratibha Basu; Bengali: প্রতিভা বসু) (March 13, 1915 – 13 October 2006) was a singer and one of the most prolific and widely read Bengali writers of novels, short stories, and essays.

== Biography ==
She was born in a village near Dhaka in 1915 to Asutosh Shome and Sarajubala Shome. She was known as Ranu Shome before she married the Bengali writer, Buddhadev Bose in 1934. She had two daughters, Meenakshi Dutta and Damayanti Basu Singh, and a son, Suddhasil Bose, who died at the age of 42. One of her granddaughters, Kankabati Dutta, is also a well-known writer in Bengali.

Bose was also a singer of popular songs. She was a pupil of Ustad Gul Mohammad Khan. The poet Nazrul Islam, singer Dilip Kumar Roy, and Rabindranath Tagore admired her voice and taught her their own songs. She made her first LP at the age of 12 and continued until the 1940s, when she gave up singing and started writing.

Bose wrote 200 books, all of which have been commercially successful. Monolina was her first novel, published in 1940. Several of her novels have been made into successful movies. After becoming a best-seller, publishers fought against each other for her books.

She had been known to be a great lover of animals. She was paralyzed from head to toe in 1972 because of an adverse reaction to an anti-rabies shot, which had become necessary as she was rescuing stray dogs who had rabies.

She died on 13 October 2006, in Kolkata from "prolonged illness".

== Awards and honours ==
She was awarded the "'Bhubonmohini" gold medal from the University of Calcutta for her contribution in Bengali language and literature. She was also awarded the Ananda Purashkar.
