= Safi Ahmed =

Indian cricketer (born 1977)

Personal information
- Born: 4 October 1977 (age 49); Calcutta, India
- Source: Cricinfo, 2 April 2016

Safi Ahmed (born 4 October 1977) is an Indian former cricketer. He played six first-class matches for Bengal between 1998 and 2007.

== See also ==
- List of Bengal cricketers
