= Udaybhanu Banerjee =

Indian cricketer (born 1955)

Personal information
- Born: 6 May 1955 (age 71); Calcutta, India
- Source: Cricinfo, 4 April 2016

Udaybhanu Banerjee (born 6 May 1955) is an Indian former cricketer. He played 24 first-class matches for Bengal between 1972 and 1986.

== See also ==
- List of Bengal cricketers
