= Jayanta Dastidar =

Indian cricketer (born 1973)

Personal information
- Full name: Jayanta Ghosh Dastidar
- Born: 13 November 1973 (age 52); Calcutta, India
- Source: ESPNcricinfo, 27 March 2016

Jayanta Dastidar (born 13 November 1973) is an Indian former cricketer. He played three first-class matches for Bengal in 1991/92.

== See also ==
- List of Bengal cricketers
