= Krishna Pamani =

Indian cricketer (born 1950)

Personal information
- Born: 20 May 1950 (age 76); Mundra, India
- Source: ESPNcricinfo, 31 March 2016

Krishna Pamani (born 20 May 1950) is an Indian former cricketer. He played two first-class matches for Bengal in 1974/75.

== See also ==
- List of Bengal cricketers
