= Sumit Panda =

Indian cricketer (born 1979)

Personal information
- Born: 3 December 1979 (age 46); Jamshedpur, India
- Source: Cricinfo, 31 March 2016

Sumit Panda (born 3 December 1979) is an Indian former cricketer. He played first-class cricket for Bengal and Jharkhand.

== See also ==
- List of Bengal cricketers
