= Gobindalal Roy =

Indian cricketer (1927–1973)

Personal information
- Born: 14 August 1927; Kasimbazar, India
- Died: 27 October 1973 (aged 46); Calcutta, India
- Source: ESPNcricinfo, 1 April 2016

Gobindalal Roy (14 August 1927 – 27 October 1973) was an Indian cricketer. He played three first-class matches for Bengal between 1950 and 1952.

== See also ==
- List of Bengal cricketers
