= Khiroja Roy =

Indian cricketer

Personal information
- Born: 14 August 1910; Mymensingh, India
- Source: ESPNcricinfo, 1 April 2016

Khiroja Roy (born 14 August 1910, date of death unknown) was an Indian cricketer. He played three first-class matches for Bengal between 1939 and 1941.

== See also ==
- List of Bengal cricketers
