= Mohammad-Al Obaidullah =

Indian cricketer (1913–1991)

Personal information
- Born: 20 August 1913; Calcutta, British India
- Died: February 1991 (aged 77)
- Source: ESPNcricinfo, 31 March 2016

Mohammad-Al Obaidullah (20 August 1913 – February 1991) was an Indian cricketer. He played three first-class matches for Bengal in 1941/42.

== See also ==
- List of Bengal cricketers
