= Srimanta Banerjee =

Indian cricketer (born 1949)

Personal information
- Born: 1 October 1949 (age 77); Rahara, West Bengal, India
- Source: Cricinfo, 25 March 2016

Srimanta Banerjee (born 1 October 1949) is an Indian former cricketer. He played four first-class matches for Bengal between 1977 and 1979.

== See also ==
- List of Bengal cricketers
