= Mintoo Das =

Indian cricketer (born 1966)

Personal information
- Born: 26 August 1966 (age 60); Calcutta, India
- Source: ESPNcricinfo, 27 March 2016

Mintoo Das (born 26 August 1966) is an Indian former cricketer. He played 23 first-class matches for Bengal between 1985 and 1994.

== See also ==
- List of Bengal cricketers
