= Subir Bhattacharjee =

Indian cricketer (born 1957)

Personal information
- Born: 21 December 1957 (age 68); Calcutta, India
- Source: Cricinfo, 25 March 2016

Subir Bhattacharjee (born 21 December 1957) is an Indian former cricketer. He played three first-class matches for Bengal in 1981/82.

== See also ==
- List of Bengal cricketers
