= Sumitro Mujumder =

Indian cricketer (born 1973)

Personal information
- Born: 18 June 1973 (age 53); Calcutta, India
- Source: Cricinfo, 30 March 2016

Sumitro Mujumder (born 18 June 1973) is an Indian former cricketer. He played five first-class matches for Bengal between 1996 and 1998.

== See also ==
- List of Bengal cricketers
