= Saikat Mukherjee =

Indian cricketer (born 1973)

Saikat Mukherjee (Cricketer)
Personal information
- Born: 23 January 1973 (age 53); Calcutta, India
- Source: Cricinfo, 30 March 2016

Saikat Mukherjee (born 23 January 1973) is an Indian former cricketer. He played two first-class matches for Bengal in 2001/02.

== See also ==
- List of Bengal cricketers
