= Nandu Chandravarkar =

Indian cricketer (born 1949)

Personal information
- Born: 5 August 1949 (age 77); Calcutta, India
- Source: ESPNcricinfo, 26 March 2016

Nandu Chandravarkar (born 5 August 1949) is an Indian former cricketer. He played three first-class matches for Bengal in 1974/75.

== See also ==
- List of Bengal cricketers
