= Kamal Mondal =

Indian cricketer (born 1982)

Personal information
- Born: 4 October 1982 (age 44); Ranaghat, India
- Source: ESPNcricinfo, 30 March 2016

Kamal Mondal (born 4 October 1982) is an Indian former cricketer. He played six first-class matches for Bengal between 2006 and 2007.

== See also ==
- List of Bengal cricketers
