= Sanat Bhattacharjee =

Indian cricketer (born 1956)

Personal information
- Born: 1 January 1956 (age 70); Calcutta, India
- Source: Cricinfo, 25 March 2016

Sanat Bhattacharjee (born 1 January 1956) is an Indian former cricketer. He played three first-class matches for Bengal in 1982/83.

== See also ==
- List of Bengal cricketers
