= Probir Chail =

Indian cricketer (born 1956)

Personal information
- Born: 1 October 1956 (age 70); Calcutta, India
- Source: Cricinfo, 26 March 2016

Probir Chail (born 1 October 1956) is an Indian former cricketer. He played seven first-class matches for Bengal between 1977 and 1983.

== See also ==
- List of Bengal cricketers
