= Tara Bhattacharjee =

Indian cricketer (1915–1984)

Personal information
- Full name: Tara Sankar Bhattacharjee
- Born: 28 August 1915; Calcutta, India
- Died: 5 August 1984 (aged 68); Calcutta, India
- Source: Cricinfo, 25 March 2016

Tara Bhattacharjee (28 August 1915 – 5 August 1984) was an Indian cricketer. He played five first-class matches for Bengal between 1938 and 1941.

== See also ==
- List of Bengal cricketers
