= Malay Banerjee =

Indian cricketer (born 1955)

Personal information
- Born: 17 January 1955 (age 71); Calcutta, India
- Source: ESPNcricinfo, 25 March 2016

Malay Banerjee (born 17 January 1955) is an Indian former cricketer. He played nine first-class matches for Bengal between 1976 and 1981.

== See also ==
- List of Bengal cricketers
