= Ivan Surita =

Indian cricketer (1915–1968)

Personal information
- Born: 5 September 1915; Calcutta, India
- Died: 18 March 1968 (aged 52); Shiliguri, India
- Source: ESPNcricinfo, 2 April 2016

Ivan Surita (5 September 1915 – 18 March 1968) was an Indian cricketer. He played three first-class matches for Bengal between 1935 and 1939.

== See also ==
- List of Bengal cricketers
