= Salil Banerjee =

Indian cricketer (born 1935)

Personal information
- Full name: Salil Kumar Banerjee
- Born: 1 October 1935 (age 91); Calcutta, British India
- Source: Cricinfo, 25 March 2016

Salil Banerjee (born 1 October 1935) is an Indian former cricketer. He played five first-class matches for Bengal between 1958 and 1962.

== See also ==
- List of Bengal cricketers
