= Samir Chakrabarti =

Indian cricketer (1943–2015)

Personal information
- Born: 30 September 1943; Calcutta, India
- Died: 11 December 2015 (aged 72); Hooghly, West Bengal, India
- Source: Cricinfo, 6 April 2016

Samir Chakrabarti (30 September 1943 – 11 December 2015) was an Indian cricketer.

== Professional career ==
He played first-class cricket for Bengal, Railways and Services.

== See also ==
- List of Bengal cricketers
