= Avilin Ghosh =

Indian cricketer (born 1990)

Personal information
- Full name: Avilin Pradip Ghosh
- Born: 21 September 1990 (age 36); Kolkata, India
- Source: ESPNcricinfo, 27 March 2016

Avilin Pradip Ghosh (born 21 September 1990) is an Indian cricketer. He played two Twenty20 matches for Bengal in 2014. In August 2014, Ghosh was named as a probable for Bengal's team for the 2014–15 Ranji Trophy. Although he did not play in the Ranji Trophy, he made his Twenty20 debut for Bengal in the 2014–15 Syed Mushtaq Ali Trophy on 11 April 2014.

== See also ==
- List of Bengal cricketers
