= Mantu Sen =

Indian cricketer (1923–1990)

Personal information
- Born: 21 June 1923; Calcutta, India
- Died: 12 April 1990 (aged 66); Calcutta, India
- Source: ESPNcricinfo, 2 April 2016

Mantu Sen (21 June 1923 – 12 April 1990) was an Indian cricketer. He played eighteen first-class matches for Bengal between 1942 and 1959.

== See also ==
- List of Bengal cricketers
