= Munish Jolly =

Indian cricketer

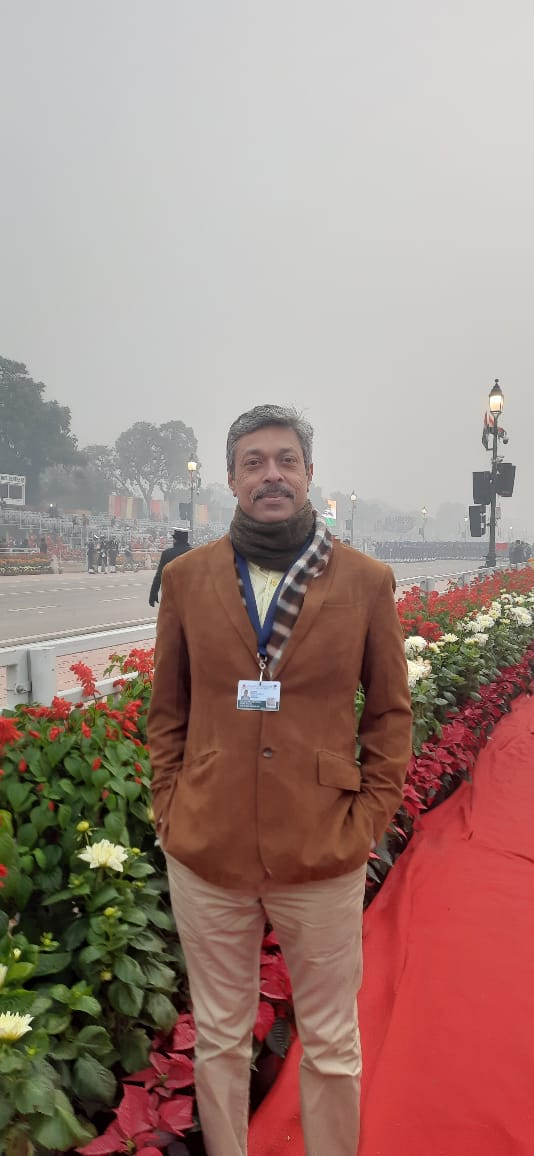

Personal information
- Born: 28 January 1974 (age 52); Delhi, India
- Batting: Right handed
- Role: Batsman
- Source: ESPNcricinfo, 28 March 2016

Munish Jolly (born 28 January 1974) is an Indian former cricketer. He played first-class match for Bengal in 1997/98. He is in the top panel of Commentators of All India Radio and is a leading Broadcaster, Voice-over artist. He had the honour of covering Rio 2016 and Tokyo 2020 Olympics with Star Sports and Sony Sports Network, respectively. He has delivered commentary in Cricket World Cups, Hockey World Cups, the Prestigious National Sports Award at the Durbar Hall in the Rashtrapati Bhavan (President House), New Delhi. He was chosen to do live commentary of swearing-in-ceremony of Honourable President of India in 2017 for All India Radio. He is also a Radio Jockey with FM Rainbow Delhi. He was part of the chosen panel of anchors to present the Commemoration Ceremony of India's first National War Memorial, Delhi on 25 February 2019, graced by the honourable Prime Minister of India, Sh. Narendra Modi.

He compered along with Col. Anil Nair, Anup Kaur, Gauri Bhola. A Master of Ceremonies, he has hosted various Government of India events, Corporate Events apart from Sport Events.In 2021 he hosted the Indian Hockey Team's felicitation Event in Delhi, organised by Ministry of Petroleum and Natural Gas for India's historic bronze medal win in Hockey at Tokyo Olympics.

He anchored the New Delhi Marathon in 2019 presided by Brand ambassador Sachin Tendulkar. He also anchors PSPB Marathon amidst sports personalities and celebs.

== Early life ==
He did his schooling from Air Force Bal Bharati School. Delhi and Graduated from Hindu College Delhi. He started playing cricket at an age of twelve years and later got selected to play Under-15 Vijay Merchant Trophy for Delhi organised by BCCI.

He was coached by Dronacharya Awardee and Padma Shri Awardee Sh. Gurcharan Singh, at National Stadium, Delhi and still considers him his Cricketing God. His two six wicket hauls vs Himachal secured a place in North Zone Team. He was the highest scorer in Under-16 Vinoo Mankad Trophy held at Chandigarh in 1987 and got selected for the Indian Boys Team. His all-round performance in Under-17 Vijay Hazare Trophy saw him find a place in North Zone side and tour Cuttack in 1990 to play Zonal Tournament. There he met the likes Rahul Dravid, S Sriram from South Zone.

Prior to the start of Under-19 CK Nayudu Trophy, representing Delhi Team he broke his right hand finger and missed out the league phase of the Tournament. However, he was selected for the knock-out stage in Kanpur and played against Bengal and Mumbai. An alumnus of Hindu College Delhi, he captained the Hindu college cricket team and he represented Delhi University twice and was a notable contributor when Delhi University became the All India Champions in 1993.

He shifted to Bengal in 1995–96 season to play Club League for Wari Athletic Club, and through his consistent all round performance got selected to play for Bengal in the Ranji Trophy League and Knock-out stages.

== International games ==
In 1995 he was selected to play an International friendly against the touring Netherland side at Ferozeshah Kotla, Delhi.

He toured England twice and played in Middlesex Club Cricketers League in London.

== Radio ==
While on a train journey from Kolkata to Delhi he came across executives of All India Radio who suggested that he present sports show for AIR. Though, reluctant, since he was actively into Cricket he took almost a year to present programs. He started with hourly cricket updates and soon was asked to host live Cricket Shows 'Anumano ke Aiyne Mein', Kaun Banega Vijeta and Man of the Match. This gave him the opportunity to interact with International Players and celebrities and shaped his career in Broadcasting. He then auditioned for FM Rainbow Delhi, got selected and presents prime time shows. He presents programs like Suprabhat, City Lights and the coveted Sandesh to Soldiers.

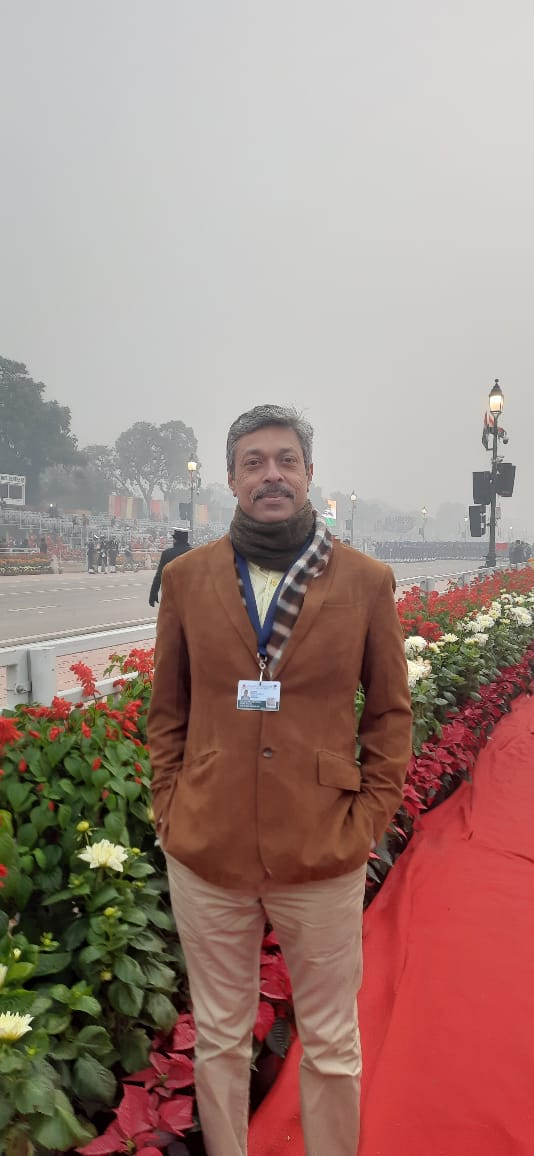
Munish Jolly on Kartavya path during 2024 Republic Day parade

== Sports commentary ==
He is part of the elite commentators panel of All India Radio and has delivered commentary in various Test Matches, One Dayers and T 20 Games. Some of the notable assignments in Commentary have been 2007 T 20 World Cup, 2016 T 20 World Cup Finals, 2018 ICC World Cup Finals and ICC T-20 World Cup 2021, 2022.

A commentator in seven Hockey World cups that includes two Jr World Cup Hockey Tournament. A TV commentator-cum-anchor in 2016 Jr Hockey World Cup in Lucknow, in which India were Champions. He visited The Hague, Netherlands for the live coverage of FIH Hockey World Cup in 2014 for All India Radio. He called the semi and the historic finals of 2018 FIH World Cup, Belgium became Champions. He covered the India games in FIH 2023 HWC for AIR.

In 2017 he was chosen to do Hindi commentary for the NBA.

He was in the panel of English Commentary for the traditional Indian game kho-kho during the first season of Ultimate Kho Kho in 2022, held in Pune.

He was chosen to do live commentary of World Test Championship finals 2023, played between India and Australia, which was broadcast by All India Radio.

== DD Sports ==
A panellist-cum-Commentator with DD sports he is a part of Cricket shows Criclive and Fourth Umpire. He has been in the team of commentators in major sporting events like T 20 World Cup, Asia Cup, Asian Games and Commonwealth Games. In 2022 he covered the National Games and Khelo India Games for DD Sports.

He did commentary for ICC Cricket World Cup 2023 for DD Sports and Akashvani.
