= Sujit Bose (cricketer) =

Indian cricketer (1934–2015)

Personal information
- Born: 26 June 1934; Meerut, British India
- Died: 25 April 2015 (aged 80); Kolkata, India
- Source: Cricinfo, 25 March 2016

Sujit Bose (26 June 1934 – 25 April 2015) was an Indian cricketer. He played eleven first-class matches for Bengal between 1957 and 1960. He was a right-arm medium bowler.

== See also ==
- List of Bengal cricketers
