= Gitimoy Basu =

Indian cricketer (born 1985)

Personal information
- Full name: Gitimoy Malay Basu
- Born: 5 March 1985 (age 41); Howrah, India
- Source: ESPNcricinfo, 25 March 2016

Gitimoy Basu (born 5 March 1985) is an Indian cricketer. He played five first-class matches for Bengal between 2010 and 2014.

== See also ==
- List of Bengal cricketers
