= Shanti Ghoshal =

Indian cricketer (born 1936)

Personal information
- Full name: Shanti Nath Ghoshal
- Born: 13 April 1936 (age 90); Calcutta, British India
- Source: Cricinfo, 28 March 2016

Shanti Ghoshal (born 13 April 1936) is an Indian former cricketer. He played first-class cricket for Bengal and Railways.

== See also ==
- List of Bengal cricketers
