= Suman Kundu =

Indian sport wrestler

Suman Kundu is a wrestler from India who won a bronze medal in women's wrestling in the 63 kg freestyle category at the 2010 Commonwealth Games.

Kundu hails from Kalwa in the Jind district of Haryana.
