= Soumen Chakrabarti =

Indian computer scientist

- Education: Indian Institute of Technology Kharagpur (Bachelor's degree); University of California, Berkeley (PhD)
- Spouse: Sunita Sarawagi
- Awards: Shanti Swarup Bhatnagar Prize for Science and Technology (2014); J. C. Bose National Fellowship (2019)
- Scientific career
- Fields: Computer Science Web Mining; Natural Language Processing; Information Retrieval Distributed Computing
- Workplaces: Indian Institute of Technology Bombay Google; Carnegie Mellon University IBM Almaden Research Center
- Doctoral advisor: Katherine Yelick

Soumen Chakrabarti (সৌমেন চক্রবর্তী) is an Indian computer scientist and professor in the Department of Computer Science and Engineering at IIT Bombay. He is known for his work on

- The CLEVER Web page ranking system based on hyperlinks, related to PageRank.
- Focused crawlers, which are Web crawlers guided by page topic classifiers.
- Keyword search on graph databases, later popularized by Facebook graph search.
- Named entity disambiguation in Web text.

He is author of an early book on Web search and mining.

He was awarded the Shanti Swarup Bhatnagar Prize in 2014. He was awarded the J. C. Bose National Fellowship in 2019.

He is a fellow of the Indian National Academy of Engineering, the Indian Academy of Sciences, and the Indian National Science Academy.

He is among the distinguished alumni of IIT Kharagpur.
