= Rabindra Chanda =

Indian cricketer (born 1932)

Personal information
- Full name: Rabindra Mohan Chanda
- Born: 1 February 1932; Dacca, Bengal Presidency, British India
- Source: Cricinfo, 4 April 2016

Rabindra Mohan Chanda (born 1 February 1932) is an Indian former cricketer. He played first-class cricket for Bengal and Railways.

== See also ==
- List of Bengal cricketers
