= Dipankar Ghosh (cricketer) =

Indian cricketer (born 1943)

Personal information
- Born: 26 November 1943 (age 82); Makarpole, British India
- Source: ESPNcricinfo, 28 March 2016

Dipankar Ghosh (born 26 November 1943) is an Indian former cricketer. He played two first-class matches for Bengal between 1964 and 1969.

== See also ==
- List of Bengal cricketers
