= Amit Banerjee (cricketer) =

Indian cricketer (born 1987)

Personal information
- Full name: Amit Ajoy Banerjee
- Born: 25 October 1987 (age 39); Uttarpara, India
- Source: ESPNcricinfo, 25 March 2016

Amit Banerjee (born 25 October 1987) is an Indian cricketer who plays as a bowler. He played four first-class matches for Bengal in 2015.

== See also ==
- List of Bengal cricketers
