= Rabi Banerjee =

Indian cricketer (1951–2021)

Personal information
- Born: 4 March 1951; Calcutta, West Bengal, India
- Died: 9 June 2021 (aged 70); Kolkata, India
- Source: Cricinfo, 9 June 2021

Rabi Banerjee (4 March 1951 – 9 June 2021) was an Indian cricketer. He played ten first-class matches for Bengal between 1969 and 1975. He died on 9 June 2021 at the age of 70 due to a prolonged illness at a city hospital in Kolkata. Prior to his death, he had contracted COVID-19 and died from post COVID-19 complications.

== See also ==
- List of Bengal cricketers
