= Rana Chowdhary =

Indian cricketer (born 1978)

Personal information
- Born: 12 April 1978; Kulti, India
- Batting: Left-handed
- Bowling: Left-arm medium pace
- Role: Cricketer

Domestic team information
- Years: Team
- Bengal

Rana Chowdhary (born 12 April 1978) is an Indian cricketer. He is a left-handed batsman and a left-arm medium pace bowler who played for Bengal cricket team.

Chowdary made his List A debut in the 2000/01 Ranji Trophy competition for Bihar. He took one wicket on his debut, though he was unable to make inroads with the bat, scoring just six runs in two innings.

== Career ==
Chowdhary was born in Kulti. Chowdhary spent more than six years out of the game, before joining Bengal in time for the start of the Inter State Twenty20 tournament competition of 2006/07. He appeared in all eight of Bengal's games in the competition, which they exited at the second stage, winning two of their four second-stage group games.

Chowdhary made his first-class debut for Bengal at the back end of 2007, playing two Ranji Trophy games, the second of which saw him score a duck in the first innings, and just a single run in the second.
