= Kalyan Chowdhury =

Indian cricketer (born 1951)

Personal information
- Born: 9 November 1951 (age 75); Calcutta, India
- Source: ESPNcricinfo, 26 March 2016

Kalyan Chowdhury (born 9 November 1951) is an Indian former cricketer. He played nineteen first-class matches for Bengal between 1970 and 1979.

== See also ==
- List of Bengal cricketers
