= Charles Inder =

English cricketer

Personal information
- Full name: Charles Edwin Inder
- Born: 2 July 1914; Hornsey, Middlesex, England
- Died: February 2001 (aged 86); Portsmouth, Hampshire, England
- Batting: Left-handed
- Bowling: Slow left arm orthodox
- Role: Bowler

Domestic team information
- Years: Team
- 1937/38: Bengal
- 1938/39: Europeans
- Source: CricketArchive, 31 October 2023

Charles Inder (2 July 1914 – February 2001) was an English cricketer who played in four first-class matches in India from 1937/38 to 1938/39. He was born in Hornsey, in county of Middlesex, and died in Portsmouth, Hampshire. His death was in February 2001 when he was aged 86, but precise date is not recorded in usual sources.

Inder played in two matches for Bengal in the 1937–38 Ranji Trophy and then two for the Europeans in next season's Bombay Quadrangular. Inder took seven wickets in his career with best figures of 3/36. He scored 122 runs in 7 innings, best score 57 not out.
