= Priyankar Mukherjee =

Indian cricketer (born 1985)

- Born: 29 March 1985 (age 40)

Priyankar Mukherjee (born 29 March 1985) is an Indian cricketer. He is a left-handed batsman and a right-arm off-break bowler who plays for Bengal. He was born in Uttarpara.

Mukherjee played a single game for the Bengali Under-16s team, during the 2000–01 season, though he didn't make another cricketing appearance for over two years, for the Under-19s. His best performance in the 2003-04 Cooch Behar trophy came in his penultimate game, in which he bowled 5–17 in the first innings of the match and 4–58 in the second.

He carried on this form with the bat into the start of the 2003-04 Under-19s limited overs competition, though he faltered slightly towards the end of the competition. In 2005–06, Mukherjee played for the Under-22s team, making some crucial innings in his occasional switches to the lower order – including a partnership of 177 with captain Manoj Tiwary – himself scoring 101 not out – against Tripura.

Mukherjee made his List A debut in the one-day Ranji Trophy competition in 2007. His first-class debut came the following season, against Andhra – and despite taking a wicket with the ball, he scored a pair with the bat.
