= Dibyendu Chakrabarty =

Indian cricketer (born 1982)

Personal information
- Born: 15 November 1982 (age 44); Howrah, India
- Source: ESPNcricinfo, 26 March 2016

Dibyendu Chakrabarty (born 15 November 1982) is an Indian former cricketer. He played ten first-class matches for Bengal between 2008 and 2010.

== See also ==
- List of Bengal cricketers
