= Durga Mukherjee =

Indian cricketer (1933–2011)

Personal information
- Born: 14 October 1933; Calcutta, India
- Died: 2 February 2011 (aged 77)
- Source: ESPNcricinfo, 30 March 2016

Durga Mukherjee (14 October 1933 – 2 February 2011) was an Indian cricketer. He played first-class cricket for Bengal and Railways.

== See also ==
- List of Bengal cricketers
