= Hirendranath Sadhu =

Indian cricketer

Cricket information
- Batting: Right-handed
- Bowling: Left-arm medium
- Role: Bowler

Domestic team information
- Years: Team
- Assam
- Bengal
- Source: , 8 October 2022

Hirendranath Sadhu (born 1 September 1915, date of death unknown) was an Indian cricketer. He played as a right-handed batsman and a left-arm medium-pace bowler.

He was born on 1 September 1915 in Chinsurah.

== Career ==
Sadhu's debut came for Bengal in 1939/40, playing against Bihar, against whom he helped his team to an innings victory. Sadhu's second and final first-class appearance followed nine seasons later, playing for Assam. He scored a duck in his first innings for the team and 11 runs in the second. Sadhu bowled 41 overs in his first-class career.
