= Probal Dutta =

Indian cricketer (born 1972)

Probal Dutta (born 11 September 1972) was an Indian cricketer. He was a right-handed batsman and leg-break bowler who played for Bengal. He was born in Calcutta.

Dutta made a single first-class appearance for the team, during the 1995–96 season, against Bihar. As an opener, Dutta scored 14 runs in the only innings in which he batted, as Bengal ran out victors by an innings margin, thanks to centuries from Saba Karim and Shrikant Kalyani.

At present he is a coach of Calcutta Cricket Academy at Vivekananda Park.
