= Dipankar Sarkar =

Indian cricketer (1950–2023)

Personal information
- Born: 8 January 1950; Calcutta, India
- Died: 30 December 2023 (aged 73)
- Batting: Right-handed
- Bowling: Right-arm off-break, Right-arm leg-break
- Role: Bowler

Domestic team information
- Years: Team
- 1966/67–1969/70, 1971/72–1974/75: Bengal
- 1970/71: Railways
- Source: ESPNcricinfo, 2 April 2016

Dipankar Sarkar (8 January 1950 – 30 December 2023) was an Indian cricketer. He played first-class cricket for Bengal and Railways.

== See also ==
- List of Bengal cricketers
