= Champi Chatterjee =

Indian cricketer (1959–2010)

Champi Chatterjee (11 May 1959 – 20 August 2010) was an Indian cricketer. He was a right-handed batsman and a right-arm medium-pace bowler who played for Bengal. He was born in Belur.

Chatterjee made a single first-class appearance for the team, during the 1983–84 season, against Delhi. Batting in the tailend, he scored two runs in the first innings and a single run in the second innings.

Chatterjee bowled nine overs during the match – taking figures of 0–51 in the first innings in which he bowled and 0–10 in the second.
