= Dhirendranath Mondal =

Indian cricketer (1929–2004)

Dhirendranath Mondal (17 July 1929 – 9 September 2004) was an Indian cricketer. He was a right-handed batsman who played for Bengal. He was born in Calcutta and died in India.

Mondal made a single first-class appearance for the team, during the 1955–96 Ranji Trophy competition, against Bihar. From the opening order, he scored a single run in the first innings and 11 not out in the second, as Bengal ran out nine-wicket victors.
