= Sabir Ali (Indian cricketer) =

Indian cricketer (born 1981)

Personal information
- Born: 1 November 1981 (age 45); Calcutta, India
- Batting: Right-handed
- Bowling: Right-arm Fast
- Role: Bowler

Domestic team information
- Years: Team
- 2001-05: Bengal
- 2006-10: Railways
- Source: Cricinfo, 2 April 2016

Sabir Ali (born 1 November 1981) is an Indian former cricketer. He played first-class cricket for Bengal and Railways.

== See also ==
- List of Bengal cricketers
