= Narinder Singh (cricketer) =

Indian cricketer (born 1954)

Personal information
- Born: 4 July 1954 (age 72); Calcutta, India
- Source: ESPNcricinfo, 3 April 2016

Narinder Singh (born 4 July 1954) is an Indian former cricketer. He played first-class cricket for Bengal, Haryana and Railways.

== See also ==
- List of Bengal cricketers
