= S. Abdur Rauf =

Bengali politician

Khan Sahib Maulvi S. Abdur Rauf

Member of the Bengal Legislative Assembly
- In office 1937–1945
- Succeeded by: Mohammed Idris
- Constituency: Howrah

Personal details
- Born: Howrah district, Bengal Presidency

Khan Sahib Maulvi S. Abdur Rauf was a Bengali politician from Howrah district.

== Early life and education ==
S. Abdur Rauf was born into a Bengali family of Muslims in the Howrah district of the Bengal Presidency.

== Career ==
S. Abdur Rauf contested in the 1937 Bengal Legislative Assembly election from Howrah (Muhammadan) constituency, winning a seat at the Bengal Legislative Assembly.
