= Sisir Mustafi =

Indian cricketer

Personal information
- Born: 1 January 1920; Calcutta, India
- Source: Cricinfo, 30 March 2016

Sisir Mustafi (born 1 January 1920) was an Indian cricketer. He played fourteen first-class matches for Bengal between 1941 and 1950.

== See also ==
- List of Bengal cricketers
