= Mohammed Idris =

Bengali politician

Member of the Bengal Legislative Assembly
- In office 1946–1947
- Preceded by: S. Abdur Rauf
- Constituency: Howrah

Personal details
- Born: Bankul, Howrah district, Bengal Presidency

Mohammed Idris was a Bengali politician from Howrah district.

== Early life and education ==
Mohammed Idris was born into a Bengali family of Muslims in the village of Bankul in the Howrah district of the Bengal Presidency.

== Career ==
Mohammed Idris contested in the 1946 Bengal Legislative Assembly election as an All-India Muslim League candidate from Howrah (Muhammadan) constituency, winning a seat at the Bengal Legislative Assembly.
