= Ranadeep Moitra =

Indian cricketer (born 1968)

Personal information
- Born: 23 April 1968 (age 58); Calcutta, India
- Source: Cricinfo, 30 March 2016

Ranadeep Moitra (born 23 April 1968) is an Indian former cricketer. He played five first-class matches for Bengal between 1986 and 1993.

== See also ==
- List of Bengal cricketers
