= Ambar Datta =

Indian cricketer (born 1938)

Ambar Datta (born 6 March 1938) was an Indian cricketer. He was a right-handed batsman and a right-arm off-break bowler who played for Bengal. He was born in Calcutta.

Datta made a single first-class appearance for the team, during the 1962–63 season, against Orissa. In the only innings in which he batted, he scored an unbeaten half-century, along with batting partner Prakash Pottar.

Datta bowled four overs during the match, conceding 31 runs.
