= Farsatullah =

Indian cricketer (born 1954)

Personal information
- Born: 1 July 1954 (age 72); Allahabad, India
- Source: ESPNcricinfo, 27 March 2016

Farsatullah (born 1 July 1954) is an Indian former cricketer. He played first-class cricket for Bengal and Railways.

== See also ==
- List of Bengal cricketers
