= Fred Harker =

English cricketer

Personal information
- Full name: Fred Harker
- Born: 12 May 1911; Norton-on-Tees, County Durham, England
- Died: 14 March 1999 (aged 87); Stockton-on-Tees, County Durham, England
- Batting: Right-handed
- Bowling: Leg break

Domestic team information
- Years: Team
- 1947: Durham
- 1944/45: Bengal

Career statistics
Competition	First-class
Matches	1
Runs scored	16
Batting average	8.00
100s/50s	–/–
Top score	16
Balls bowled	24
Wickets	1
Bowling average	16.00
5 wickets in innings	–
10 wickets in match	–
Best bowling	1/16
Catches/stumpings	–/–
- Source: ESPNcricinfo, 31 August 2011

Fred Harker (12 May 1911 – 14 March 1999) was an English cricketer. Harker was a right-handed batsman who bowled leg break. He was born in Norton-on-Tees, County Durham.

Harker made a single first-class appearance in the British Raj for Bengal against United Provinces in the 1944/45 Ranji Trophy. In Bengal's first-innings he was dismissed for a duck by S.N. Gandhi, while in their second-innings he was dismissed for 16 runs by J. Mehra. He bowled during the United Provinces first-innings, taking the wicket of A. Majeed for the cost of 16 runs from 4 overs. Later when he was back in England, he played two matches for Durham in the 1947 Minor Counties Championship, playing a match each against the Yorkshire Second XI and the Lancashire Second XI.

He died in Stockton-on-Tees, County Durham on 14 March 1999.
