= Shome Panel =

The Shome Panel is responsible for constituting guidelines for General Anti Avoidance Rules (GAAR) in India. The panel was established by Dr. Manmohan Singh and headed by economist Parthasarathi Shome.

== About ==
The committee has said that the retrospective application of tax law should happen in the rarest of rare cases and for one of three reasons only:

1. To correct anomalies in the statute.
2. To matters that are clarificatory in nature such as technical/procedural defects that vitiate the substantive law.
3. To protect the tax base from abusive tax planning schemes to avoid tax.

The panel has recommend deferring GAAR.
