= Sunit Shome =

Indian cricketer (born 1932)

Personal information
- Born: 22 August 1932 (age 94); Calcutta, India
- Source: Cricinfo, 2 April 2016

Sunit Shome (born 22 August 1932) is an Indian former cricketer. He played 18 first-class matches for Bengal between 1952 and 1961.

== See also ==
- List of Bengal cricketers
