= Ashoke Mustafi =

Indian cricketer (1933–2020)

Personal information
- Born: 1 December 1933; Calcutta, India
- Died: 30 July 2020 (aged 86)
- Source: ESPNcricinfo, 30 March 2016

Ashoke Mustafi (1 December 1933 – 30 July 2020) was an Indian cricketer. He played two first-class matches for Bengal in 1958/59.

== See also ==
- List of Bengal cricketers
