= Vishal Sharma (Railways cricketer) =

Indian cricketer (born 1977)

Personal information
- Born: 15 September 1977 (age 49); Delhi, India
- Source: Cricinfo, 11 April 2016

Vishal Sharma (born 15 September 1977) is an Indian former cricketer. He played twelve first-class matches for Railways between 1997 and 2000.

== See also ==
- List of Delhi cricketers
