= Kamal Bhattacharjee =

Indian cricketer (born 1936)

Personal information
- Born: 15 June 1936 (age 90); Baharampur, British India
- Source: ESPNcricinfo, 25 March 2016

Kamal Bhattacharjee (born 15 June 1936) is an Indian former cricketer. He played first-class cricket for Bengal and Railways.

== See also ==
- List of Bengal cricketers
