= Madansingh Parmar =

Indian cricketer (born 1936)

Personal information
- Born: 20 August 1936 (age 90); Danta, India
- Source: ESPNcricinfo, 6 April 2016

Madansingh Parmar (born 20 August 1936) is an Indian former cricketer. He played first-class cricket for several domestic teams in India between 1956 and 1970.

== See also ==
- List of Bengal cricketers
