= Jagannath Bhattacharya =

Indian doctor and politician

MLA
- In office 2006–2011
- Constituency: Shibpur

Personal details
- Born: 1954 (age 71–72) Howrah
- Party: All India Forward Bloc
- Parent: Late Madhusudan Bhattacharya (father)
- Relatives: Kanailal Bhattacharyya
- Education: University of Calcutta

Jagannath Bhattacharya is an Indian doctor and Orthopaedics specialist. He is also a politician. He joined the All India Forward Bloc.

== Education ==
Jagannath Bhattacharya had his primary education in Santragachi Kedarnath Institution, Howrah. Then he gained MBBS from Calcutta University in 1977 and MS (Ortho) degree from University College of Medicine (CU) in 1984.

== Political life ==
Jagannath Bhattacharya was an elected member of the Legislative Assembly in Shibpur of the state of West Bengal in India, under the political party of AIFB. He was active from 2006 to 2011.
