= Hari Rajguru =

Indian cricketer (born 1939)

Personal information
- Born: 24 December 1939 (age 86); Asansol, India
- Batting: Right-handed
- Bowling: Right-arm medium
- Source: ESPNcricinfo, 1 April 2016

Hari Rajguru (born 24 December 1939) is an Indian former cricketer. He played two first-class matches for Bengal in 1960/61.
