= Nemai Ghosh (cricketer) =

Indian cricketer (born 1939)

Personal information
- Born: 12 December 1939 (age 86); Mymensingh, Bengal, British India
- Source: ESPNcricinfo, 6 April 2016

Nemai Ghosh (born 12 December 1939) is an Indian former cricketer. He played eleven first-class matches for Bengal between 1958 and 1966.

== See also ==
- List of Bengal cricketers
