= Kalyan Ghosh (cricketer) =

Indian cricketer (born 1946)

Personal information
- Born: 4 November 1946 (age 80); Calcutta, India
- Source: ESPNcricinfo, 28 March 2016

Kalyan Ghosh (born 4 November 1946) is an Indian former cricketer. He played ten first-class matches for Bengal between 1964 and 1971.

== See also ==
- List of Bengal cricketers
