= Pritam Chakraborty (cricketer) =

Indian cricketer (born 1994)

Personal information
- Full name: Pritam Biplab Chakraborty
- Born: 16 September 1994 (age 32); Howrah, West Bengal, India
- Batting: Right-handed
- Bowling: Right arm medium

Domestic team information
- Years: Team
- 2014–present: Bengal

Career statistics
| Competition | FC | T20 |
|---|---|---|
| Matches | 3 | 5 |
| Runs scored | 20 | 2 |
| Batting average | 20.00 | - |
| 100s/50s | 0/0 | 0/0 |
| Top score | 20 | 1* |
| Balls bowled | 542 | 96 |
| Wickets | 9 | 5 |
| Bowling average | 30.44 | 16.00 |
| 5 wickets in innings | 0 | 0 |
| 10 wickets in match | 0 | 0 |
| Best bowling | 3/63 | 2/9 |
| Catches/stumpings | 1/- | 1/- |
- Source: Cricinfo, 1 January 2023

Pritam Chakraborty (born 16 September 1994) is an Indian cricketer. He plays first-class cricket for Bengal.

== See also ==
- List of Bengal cricketers
