= Robert Gourlay (cricketer) =

Scottish cricketer

Robert Alan Gourlay
Personal information
- Born: 24 July 1904; Moniaive, Dumfries, Scotland
- Died: 1951 (aged 46–47); Midhurst, Sussex, England
- Source: Cricinfo, 28 March 2016

Robert Gourlay (24 July 1904 – 1951) was a Scottish cricketer. He played first-class cricket for Bengal and Europeans.

== See also ==
- List of Bengal cricketers
