= Soumen Singh =

Indian cricketer (born 1975)

Personal information
- Born: 27 October 1975 (age 51); Calcutta, India
- Source: Cricinfo, 2 April 2016

Soumen Singh (born 27 October 1975) is an Indian former cricketer. He played four List A matches for Bengal in 2001/02.

== See also ==
- List of Bengal cricketers
