= Parthasarathi Bhattacharya =

Indian cricketer (born 1986)

Personal information
- Full name: Parthasarathi Asutosh Bhattacharya
- Born: 27 August 1986 (age 40); Hooghly, Bengal
- Batting: Right-handed
- Bowling: Right-arm fast-medium
- Role: Batter

Domestic team information
- Years: Team
- 2011/12–2015/16: Bengal
- Source: Cricinfo, 4 April 2016

Parthasarathi Asutosh Bhattacharya (born 27 August 1986) is an Indian cricketer who played for Bengal in five first-class matches between 2011/12 and 2015/16. Born in Hooghly, he batted right-handed and could bowl fast medium pace if needed. His name is spelled Bhattacharya but one source has Bhattacharjee.
