= Jamshed Madan =

Indian cricketer (1915–1986)

Jamshed Burjor Madan (7 January 1915 – 15 September 1986) was an Indian cricketer. He was a right-handed batsman who played for Bengal. He was born in Karachi and died in Calcutta.

Madan made a single first-class appearance for the side, during the 1942–43 Ranji Trophy. As an opener, he contributed five runs to the only innings in which he batted, the match finishing in a draw after a Holkar innings which saw three players score a century.
