= Probodh Dutt =

Indian cricketer

Personal information
- Full name: Probodh Dhan Dutt
- Born: 10 June 1917; Calcutta, British India
- Source: Cricinfo, 27 March 2016

Probodh Dutt (born 10 June 1917) was an Indian cricketer. He played seven first-class matches for Bengal between 1935 and 1944.

== See also ==
- List of Bengal cricketers
