= Jolly Sarkar =

Indian cricketer (born 1939)

Personal information
- Born: 30 September 1939 (age 87); Howrah, India
- Source: ESPNcricinfo, 2 April 2016

Jolly Sarkar (born 30 September 1939) is an Indian former cricketer. He played twelve first-class matches for Bengal between 1964 and 1968.

== See also ==
- List of Bengal cricketers
