= Sunil Das Gupta =

Indian cricketer

Personal information
- Born: Calcutta, India
- Died: 12 December 2004; Kolkata, India
- Source: Cricinfo, 6 April 2016

Sunil Das Gupta (date of birth unknown, died 12 December 2004) was an Indian cricketer. He played one first-class match for Bengal in 1952/53.

== See also ==
- List of Bengal cricketers
