= Jayojit Basu =

Indian cricketer (born 1989)

Personal information
- Full name: Jayojit Jayaditya Basu
- Born: 14 September 1989 (age 37); Calcutta, India
- Source: ESPNcricinfo, 25 March 2016

Jayojit Basu (born 14 September 1989) is an Indian cricketer. He plays first-class cricket for Bengal.

== See also ==
- List of Bengal cricketers
