= Swapan Sen =

Indian cricketer (born 1951)

Personal information
- Born: 4 January 1951 (age 75); Calcutta, India
- Source: Cricinfo, 2 April 2016

Swapan Sen (born 4 January 1951) is an Indian former cricketer. He played first-class cricket for Bengal and Railways.

== See also ==
- List of Bengal cricketers
