= Gautam Shome Sr. =

Indian cricketer (1958–2023)

Gautam Kumar Shome Sr.
Personal information
- Born: 28 May 1958; Calcutta, West Bengal, India
- Died: 10 February 2023 (aged 64); Kolkata, West Bengal, India
- Source: ESPNcricinfo, 2 April 2016

Gautam Kumar Shome (28 May 1958 – 10 February 2023), known as Gautam Shome Senior during his career, was an Indian cricketer. He played seven first-class matches for Bengal between 1984 and 1986.

Shome died on 10 February 2023, at the age of 64.

== See also ==
- List of Bengal cricketers
