= Sumit Shome =

Indian cricketer (born 1955)

Personal information
- Born: 23 December 1955 (age 70); Jamshedpur, India
- Source: Cricinfo, 2 April 2016

Sumit Shome (born 23 December 1955) is an Indian former cricketer. He played first-class cricket for Bengal for Jharkhand.

== See also ==
- List of Bengal cricketers
