= Rajendranath Sanyal =

Indian cricketer (born 1935)

Personal information
- Born: 24 May 1935 (age 91); Ranchi, India
- Batting: Right-handed
- Bowling: Right-arm off break
- Role: All rounder
- Source: Cricinfo, 3 April 2016

Rajendranath Sanyal (born 24 May 1935) is a former Indian cricketer. He played first-class cricket for Bengal, Jharkhand and Railways.
