= Jiban Ghosh (cricketer) =

Indian cricketer (born 1946)

Personal information
- Born: 2 January 1946 (age 80); Calcutta, British India
- Source: ESPNcricinfo, 28 March 2016

Jiban Ghosh (born 2 January 1946) is an Indian former cricketer. He played first-class cricket for Bengal and Railways.

== See also ==
- List of Bengal cricketers
