= Subhomoy Das =

Indian cricketer (born 1981)

Personal information
- Full name: Subhomoy Gupinath Das
- Born: 26 December 1981 (age 44); Kolkata, India
- Batting: Right-handed
- Source: Cricinfo, 18 October 2015

Subhomoy Das (born 26 December 1981) is an Indian first-class cricketer who plays for Bengal.
