= Sanjib Sanyal =

Indian cricketer (born 1977)

Personal information
- Born: 25 July 1977 (age 49); Howrah, India
- Source: Cricinfo, 2 April 2016

Sanjib Sanyal (born 25 July 1977) is an Indian former cricketer. He played first-class cricket for Bengal and Railways.

== See also ==
- List of Bengal cricketers
