= Cliff Tamplin =

Welsh cricketer (1920–2006)

Personal information
- Full name: Clifford Tamplin
- Born: 14 May 1920; Cardiff, Glamorgan, Wales
- Died: 1 February 2006 (aged 85); Leominster, Herefordshire, England
- Batting: Right-handed
- Role: Wicket-keeper

Domestic team information
- Years: Team
- 1947: Glamorgan
- 1942/43: Bengal

Career statistics
Competition	FC
Matches	4
Runs scored	56
Batting average	18.66
100s/50s	–/–
Top score	40*
Catches/stumpings	8/2
- Source: ESPNcricinfo, 28 June 2010

Clifford Tamplin (14 May 1920 – 1 February 2006), also known as Cyril Tamplin, was a Welsh cricketer. Tamplin was a right-handed batsman who played primarily as a wicket-keeper.

Tamplin was born in Cardiff, Glamorgan in May 1920. He made his first-class debut while on war service in India for Bengal against Bihar in the 1942/43 Ranji Trophy at Eden Gardens, Calcutta.

Tamplin later returned to the United Kingdom and made his first-class debut for Glamorgan against the touring South Africans in 1947. Tamplin played 2 further first-class matches for the county in 1947, against Kent and Derbyshire. In his 4 first-class matches, he scored 56 runs at a batting average of 18.66 and a high score of 40*. Behind the stumps he took 8 catches and made 2 stumpings. His first-class career may have lasted longer, had it not been for the presence of Haydn Davies in the Glamorgan side. Tamplin died in Leominster, Herefordshire on 1 February 2006, at the age of 85.
