= Ritam Kundu =

Indian cricketer (born 1983)

Personal information
- Born: 26 November 1983 (age 42); Uttarpara, India
- Source: Cricinfo, 28 March 2016

Ritam Kundu (born 26 November 1983) is an Indian former cricketer. He played ten first-class matches for Bengal between 2004 and 2008.

== See also ==
- List of Bengal cricketers
