= Sivaji Bose =

Indian cricketer (1925–2011)

Personal information
- Full name: Sivaji Mohan Basu Thakur
- Born: 6 January 1925; Mymensingh, Bengal Presidency, British India (now in Bangladesh)
- Died: 24 March 2011 (aged 86)
- Batting: Right-handed
- Bowling: Right-arm leg break and googly
- Role: Batsman

Domestic team information
- Years: Team
- 1949/50–1957/58: Bengal
- 1958/59: Railways
- Source: Cricinfo, 25 March 2016

Sivaji Mohan Basu Thakur (6 January 1925 – 24 March 2011), known as Sivaji Bose, was an Indian cricketer. He batted right-handed and scored two first-class hundreds, highest score of 147. He was an occasional spin bowler who used leg spin and googly. Bose played in 32 first-class cricket matches for Bengal and Railways.
