= Debabrata Das =

Indian cricketer (born 1986)

Personal information
- Full name: Debabrata Baidya Das
- Born: 22 September 1986 (age 40); Siliguri, West Bengal, India
- Batting: Right-handed
- Role: Batsman, wicketkeeper

Domestic team information
- Years: Team
- 1999–2003: Bengal
- 2008, 2012–2014: Kolkata Knight Riders
- Source: , October 2012

Debabrata Das is an Indian former cricketer who played domestic cricket for Bengal and the IPL franchise Kolkata Knight Riders (KKR). Das first came to prominence as the member of the Indian Under-19 team in 2005. One of the older members of the Indian U19 World Cup squad which was defeated by Pakistan in the 2006 ICC Under-19 Cricket World Cup final, this right-handed batsman only broke into the team during the Afro-Asia U19 Cup in November 2005. He obviously did enough to impress the selectors as he played in every match and scored 156 runs in his six innings to date. However, he was unable to make the transition to the senior national team despite good performances for Bengal in the domestic one-day competition.

In 2008, Das made his T20 debut for the Kolkata Knight Riders. He has played with the team in all the 5 seasons so far impressing the critics with performances like 29 (20 balls) versus Mumbai Indians in 2008 and 35* (23 balls) against King's XI Punjab in 2012. His best performance for his franchise came in the 2012 Champions League T20 tournament when he smashed 43* in just 19 balls against Nashua Titans. He remains an integral part of the KKR side. He was released by Kolkata Knight Riders on 5 December 2014.
