= Soumen Karmarkar =

Indian cricketer (born 1973)

Soumen Karmarkar (born 24 November 1973) was an Indian cricketer. He was a right-handed batsman and slow left-arm bowler who played for Bengal. He was born in Calcutta.

Karmarkar made two appearances for the Under-19s team during the Cooch Behar Trophy competition of 1992–93, assisting his team to a significant victory in the second of these two games. Karmarkar made his List A debut the following season, against Tripura, and, as the only bowler to complete his ten-over spell, did so conceding just 19 runs, capturing one wicket.

Karmarkar's only first-class appearance came in January 1994 against Orissa. In the only innings in which he batted, he scored a single run.
