= Soumendranath Kundu =

Indian cricketer (1942–2019)

Personal information
- Born: 5 January 1942; Calcutta, British India
- Died: 11 July 2019 (aged 77)
- Source: Cricinfo, 28 March 2016

Soumendranath Kundu (5 January 1942 – 11 July 2019) was an Indian cricketer. He played first-class cricket for Bengal and Railways.

== See also ==
- List of Bengal cricketers
