= 2015–16 Ranji Trophy Group B =

Cricket tournament

2015-16 Ranji Trophy Group B
- The Ranji Trophy, awarded to the winners
- Dates: 1 October 2015 – 4 December 2015
- Administrator(s): BCCI
- Cricket format: First-class cricket
- Tournament format(s): Round-robin
- Host(s): India
- Participants: 9
- Matches: 36

The 2015–16 Ranji Trophy is the 82nd season of the Ranji Trophy, the premier first-class cricket tournament in India. It is being contested by 27 teams divided into three groups of nine teams each.

Top three teams advance to knockout stage and ninth place team will be relegated to Group C for 2016–17 Ranji Trophy.

== Squads ==
Andhra Pradesh	Baroda	Gujarat	Madhya Pradesh
Mohammad Kaif (c); Prasanth Kumar (vc); Murumulla Sriram; Ashwin Hebbar; Bandaru Ayyappa; Srikar Bharat (wk); Ricky Bhui; Kakani Harish; A. G. Pradeep; Jyothi Krishna; K. V. Sasikanth; Hanumappa Shivraj; Duvvarapu Siva Kumar; Cheepurapalli Stephen; Bodavarapu Sudhakar; Bodapati Sumanth; Paidikalva Vijaykumar	Aditya Waghmode (c); Deepak Hooda (vc); Bhargav Bhatt; Kedar Devdhar; Gagandeep Singh; Sagar Mangalorkar; Hardik Pandya; Bhargav Patel (wk); Monil Patel; Babashafi Pathan; Yusuf Pathan; Pinal Shah (wk); Hitesh Solanki; Swapnil Singh; Murtuja Vahora	Parthiv Patel (c); Rohit Dahiya; Priyank Kirit Panchal; Mehul Patel; Rujul Bhatt; Jasprit Bumrah; Samit Gohel; Manpreet Juneja; Rush Kalaria; Bhargav Merai; Hardik Patel; Niraj Patel; Smit Patel; Ramesh Powar; RP Singh; Venugopal Rao	Devendra Bundela (c); Naman Ojha; Ankit Sharma; Avesh Khan; Udit Birla; Ankit Dane; Puneet Datey; Harpreet Singh; Mihir Hirwani; Mohnish Mishra; Ishwar Pandey; Rajat Patidar; Rameez Khan; Yogesh Rawat; Jalaj Saxena; Aditya Shrivastava

Mumbai	Punjab	Railways	Tamil Nadu	Uttar Pradesh
Aditya Tare (c/wk); Badre Alam; Vishal Dabholkar; Harmeet Singh; Akhil Herwadkar; Shreyas Iyer; Dhawal Kulkarni; Siddhesh Lad; Tashuk Ali; Abhishek Nayar; Nikhil Patil; Abhishek Raut; Balwinder Sandhu; Shardul Thakur; Suryakumar Yadav|	Harbhajan Singh (c); Sarabjit Ladda; Varun Khanna; Deepak Bansal; Barinder Sran; Himanshu Chawla; Gurkeerat Singh; Jiwanjot Singh; Siddarth Kaul; Uday Kaul; Gitansh Khera (wk); Mandeep Singh; Maninder Singh; Pargat Singh; Mayank Sidhana; Manan Vohra; Yuvraj Singh	Mahesh Rawat (c); Rohan Bhosale; Ranjeet Mali; Anureet Singh; Ashish Singh; Prashant Awasthi; V. Cheluvaraj; Faiz Ahmed; Arindam Ghosh; Hitesh Kadam; Anustup Majumdar; Amit Mishra; Arnab Nandi; Karn Sharma; Krishnakant Upadhyay; Saurabh Wakaskar	Abhinav Mukund (capt); Baba Aparajith; Bharath Shankar; Baba Indrajith; Vijay Shankar; Ramaswamy Prasanna; Dinesh Karthik; Malolan Rangarajan; Rahil Shah; D. T. Chandrasekar; Aswin Crist; Lakshminarayanan Vignesh; M Mohammed; J Kousik	Praveen Kumar (c); Eklavya Dwivedi (vc); Akshdeep Nath; Almas Shaukat; Amit Mishra; Himanshu Asnora; Piyush Chawla; Israr Khan; Sarfaraz Khan; Deepak Sharma; Mohammad Saif; Deependra Pandey; Saurabh Kumar; Umang Sharma; Tanmay Srivastava

== Points table ==
Team	Pld	W	L	D	A	WI	FI	Pts	NRR
Mumbai	8	4	0	4	0	1	3	35	+0.851
Punjab	8	3	2	3	0	1	2	26	+0.045
Madhya Pradesh	8	3	2	3	0	1	1	24	-0.059
Gujarat	8	3	1	4	0	2	0	24	-0.092
Uttar Pradesh	8	2	1	5	0	0	2	21	-0.117
Tamil Nadu	8	2	2	4	0	0	1	18	-0.321
Baroda	8	2	3	3	0	2	0	17	-0.045
Railways	8	2	6	0	0	0	0	12	0.039
Andhra Pradesh	8	0	4	4	0	0	3	10	-0.459

- Top three teams advance to knockout stage.
- Bottom place team will be relegated to Group C for 2016–17 Ranji Trophy.

== Fixtures ==
=== Round 1 ===
1–4 October
Scorecard

Tamil Nadu (H)	v	Baroda
125 (57.4 overs); Baba Aparajith 44 (90); Yusuf Pathan 4/29 (10.9 overs)		159 (49.2 overs); Yusuf Pathan 41 (43); Rahil Shah 4/38 (19 overs)
155 (59.4 overs); Baba Aparajith 39 (74); Bhargav Bhatt 6/58 (23.4 overs)		114 (35.4 overs); Deepak Hooda 32 (19); Rahil Shah 5/43 (15.4 overs)

Tamil Nadu won by 7 runs
MA Chidambaram Stadium, Chennai
Umpires: Navdeep Singh (Ind) and Virender Sharma (Ind)
Player of the match: Pinal Shah (Tamil Nadu)

- Tamil Nadu won the toss and elected to bat.
- Hitesh Solanki (Baroda), DT Chandrasekar, J Kousik and Lakshminarayanan Vignesh (Tamil Nadu) all made their first-class debuts.

1–4 October
Scorecard

Uttar Pradesh (H)	v	Madhya Pradesh
686/7d Mohammad Saif 198 (287); Ishwar Pandey 3/75 (29.1 overs)		528/7; Aditya Shrivastava 169 (401); Ankit Rajpoot 4/87 (25 overs)

Match drawn
Teerthanker Mahaveer University Ground, Moradabad
Umpires: Chirra Ravikanthreddy (Ind) and R. Sundar (Ind)
Player of the match: Mohammad Saif (Uttar Pradesh)

- Uttar Pradesh won the toss and elected to bat.
- Almas Shaukat (Uttar Pradesh) made his first-class debut.

1–4 October
Scorecard

Punjab (H)	v	Railways
604/5d Gurkeerat Mann 201* (207); Arnab Nandi 1/86 (27 overs)		196; Ashish Singh 90 (160); Barinder Singh Sran 6/61 (17 overs)
		282 (f/o); Arindam Ghosh 98* (152); Varun Khanna 8/97 (28 overs)

Punjab won by an innings and 126 runs
Punjab Cricket Association IS Bindra Stadium, Mohali
Umpires: Anil Dandekar (Ind) and Krishnaraj Srinath (Ind)
Player of the match: Barinder Sran (Punjab)

- Punjab won the toss and elected to bat.
- Ashish Singh and Hitesh Kadam (Railways) both made their first-class debuts.

1–4 October
Scorecard

Andhra Pradesh (H)	v	Mumbai
244 (123. 2 overs); Ricky Bhui 103 (124); Balwinder Sandhu 5/53 (29 overs)		237 (91.5 overs); Siddhesh Lad 86 (163); Bandaru Ayyappa 6/71 (24.5 overs)
176/3 (65 overs); Prasanth Kumar 59* (106); Vishal Dabholkar 2/26 (22 overs)

Match drawn
Dr PVG Raju ACA Sports Complex, Vizianagaram
Umpires: Ulhas Gandhe (Ind) and Tapan Sharma (Ind)
Player of the match: Bandaru Ayyappa (Andhra)

- Mumbai won the toss and elected to field.

=== Round 2 ===
8–11 October
Scorecard

Tamil Nadu	v	Madhya Pradesh (H)
596/9d (202.2 overs); J Kousik 151 (272); Udit Birla 3/52 (24 overs)		407 (141.3 overs); Jalaj Saxena 124 (250); Aswin Crist 4/88 (28 overs)

Match drawn
Emerald High School Ground, Indore
Umpires: Navdeep Singh (Ind) and Rohan Pandit (Ind)
Player of the match: J Kousik (Tamil Nadu)

- Madhya Pradesh won the toss and elected to field.

8–11 October
Scorecard

Punjab	v	Mumbai (H)
154 (57 overs); Manan Vohra 34 (65); Balwinder Sandhu 4/31 (16 overs)		569/8d (124 overs); Shreyas Iyer 200 (176); Barinder Sran 3/87 (22 overs)
403 (127.2 overs); Mandeep Singh 116 (208); Akhil Herwadkar 6/52 (22.2 overs)

Mumbai won by an innings and 12 runs
Wankhede Stadium, Mumbai
Umpires: Krishnaraj Srinath (Ind) and Krishnamachari Srinivasan (Ind)
Player of the match: Shreyas Iyer (Mumbai)

- Mumbai won the toss and elected to field.

8–11 October
Scorecard

Gujarat	v	Andhra Pradesh (H)
308 (100.3 overs); Parthiv Patel 122 (176); Duvvarapu Siva Kumar 3/44 (26 overs)		421 (127.2 overs); Srikar Bharat 127 (201); Rush Kalaria 5/55 (26.4 overs)
254/4 (90 overs); Priyank Kirit Panchal 72 (173); Paidikalva Vijaykumar 1/22 (16 overs)

Match drawn
Dr PVG Raju ACA Sports Complex, Vizianagaram
Umpires: Abhijit Deshmukh (Ind) and Nitin Pandit (Ind)
Player of the match: Srikar Bharat (Andhra)

- Andhra won the toss and elected to field.

8–11 October
Scorecard

Railways	v	Baroda (H)
166 (48 overs); Karn Sharma 51 (84); Hardik Pandya 5/61 (15)		500/8d (142 overs); Deepak Hooda 122 (179); Anureet Singh 5/111 (39)
221 (61.3 overs); Prashant Awasthi 67 (109); Hardik Pandya 3/30 (15 overs)

Baroda won by an innings and 113 runs
Moti Bagh Stadium, Vadodara
Umpires: Yeshwant Barde (Ind) and Saiyed Khalid (Ind)
Player of the match: Hardik Pandya (Baroda)

- Railways won the toss and elected to bat.

=== Round 3 ===
15–18 October
Scorecard

Tamil Nadu	v	Mumbai (H)
434 (144.4 overs); Dinesh Karthik 167 (262); Vishal Dabholkar 5/122 (41 overs)		294 (93 overs); Siddhesh Lad 150 (184); M Mohammed 5/86 (25 overs)
95 (36 overs); Malolan Rangarajan 33 (43); Vishal Dabholkar 7/53 (18 overs)		236/9 (60.4 overs); Shreyas Iyer 83 (71); Rahil Shah 4/78 (25 overs)

Mumbai won by 1 wicket
Sharad Pawar Cricket Academy, Mumbai
Umpires: Nitin Pandit (Ind) and Tapan Sharma (Ind)
Player of the match: Vishal Dabholkar (Mumbai)

- Mumbai won the toss and elected to field.

15–18 October
Scorecard

Gujarat	v	Punjab (H)
467 (139.1 overs); Parthiv Patel 113 (190); Sarabjit Ladda 5/133 (41.1 overs)		608 (159.3 overs); Yuvraj Singh 187 (233); Rujul Bhatt 8/151 (32.3 overs)
135/4 (43 overs); Bhargav Merai 56 (88); Sarabjit Ladda 2/60 (16 overs)

Match drawn
Punjab Cricket Association Stadium, Mohali
Umpires: Puttarangaiah Jayapal (Ind) and Nand Kishore
Player of the match: Yuvraj Singh (Punjab)

- Punjab won the toss and elected to field.

15–18 October
Scorecard

Railways	v	Uttar Pradesh (H)
375 (101.3 overs); Ashish Singh 101 (188); Kuldeep Yadav 3/64 (18 overs)		264 (103.5 overs); Tanmay Srivastava 93 (267); Ranjeet Mali 5/88 (28.5 overs)
229/4d (70 overs); Faiz Ahmed 80 (123); Ankit Rajpoot 2/53 (18 overs)		58 (42 overs); Himanshu Asnora 19 (72); Anureet Singh 5/15 (14 overs)

Railways won by 282 runs
Jawaharlal Nehru Stadium, Ghaziabad
Umpires: K. N. Ananthapadmanabhan (Ind) and Krishnaraj Srinath (Ind)
Player of the match: Anureet Singh (Railways)

- Uttar Pradesh won the toss and elected to field.
- Faiz Ahmed (Railways) and Israr Azim (Uttar Pradesh) made their first-class debuts.

15–18 October
Scorecard

Baroda	v	Andhra Pradesh (H)
302 (107.2 overs); Kedar Devdhar 97 (168); Cheepurapalli Stephen 4/72 (24 overs)		474/6d (195.4 overs); Srikar Bharat 144 (301); Ketan Panchal 2/23 (13 overs)
60/2 (17 overs); Kedar Devdhar 30* (57); Bandaru Ayyappa 2/18 (3 overs)

Match drawn
Dr PVG Raju ACA Sports Complex, Vizianagaram
Umpires: Sudhir Asnani (Ind) and Nikhil Patwardhan (Ind)
Player of the match: Srikar Bharat (Andhra)

- Andhra won the toss and elected to field.

=== Round 4 ===
22–25 October
Scorecard

Madhya Pradesh	v	Punjab (H)
370 (125.1 overs); Aditya Shrivastava 131 (315); Sarabjit Ladda 5/110 (39 overs)		358 (113.5 overs); Uday Kaul 139 (266); Ankit Sharma 5/122 (38 overs)
314/6 (107 overs); Jalaj Saxena 95 (213); Sarabjit Ladda 3/52 (28 overs)

Match drawn
Dhruve Pandove Stadium, Patiala
Umpires: Rohan Pandit (Ind) and Krishnamachari Srinivasan (Ind)
Player of the match: Jalaj Saxena (Madhya Pradesh)

- Madhya Pradesh won the toss and elected to bat.
- Pargat Singh (Punjab) made his first-class debut.

22–25 October
Scorecard

Mumbai	v	Baroda (H)
447 (127.1 overs); Shreyas Iyer 173 (183); Ajitesh Argal 4/67 (25 overs)		397 (158.5 overs); Kedar Devdhar 95 (145); Dhawal Kulkarni 5/82 (37 overs)
202/5 (61.3 overs); Suryakumar Yadav 100* (145); Swapnil Singh 3/70 (22 overs)

Match drawn
Reliance Stadium, Vadodara
Umpires: Navdeep Singh (Ind) and Virender Sharma (Ind)
Player of the match: Shreyas Iyer (Mumbai)

- Mumbai won the toss and elected to bat.
- Monil Patel (Baroda) made his first-class debut.

22–25 October
Scorecard

Gujarat	v	Railways (H)
387 (127.4 overs); Priyank Kirit Panchal 141 (233); Anureet Singh 4/91 (40.4 overs)		234 (83.5 overs); Saurabh Wakaskar 93 (160); Jasprit Bumrah 4/47 (20 overs)
		117 f/o (39.4 overs); Arindam Ghosh 25* (86); Mehul Patel 3/25 (10 overs)

Gujarat won by an innings and 36 runs
Karnail Singh Stadium, Delhi
Umpires: Belur Ravi (Ind) and Chirra Ravikanthreddy (Ind)
Player of the match: Priyank Kirit Panchal (Gujarat)

- Railways won the toss and elected to field.

22–25 October
Scorecard

Uttar Pradesh	v	Andhra Pradesh (H)
170 (61.5 overs); Praveen Kumar 47 (65); Duvvarapu Siva Kumar 3/29 (18 overs)		297 (95.3 overs); Prasanth Kumar 67 (150); Praveen Kumar 4/86 (33 overs)
309 (88.5 overs); Eklavya Dwivedi 72 (135); Paidikalva Vijaykumar 4/68 (22 overs)		126 (47.3 overs); Paidikalva Vijaykumar 28 (45); Ankit Rajpoot 5/35 (16 overs)

Uttar Pradesh won by 56 runs
CSR Sharma College Ground, Ongole
Umpires: Subrat Das (Ind) and Umesh Dubey (Ind)
Player of the match: Praveen Kumar (Uttar Pradesh)

- Andhra won the toss and elected to field.
- K. V. Sasikanth (Andhra) made his first-class debut.

=== Round 5 ===
30 October–2 November
Scorecard

Tamil Nadu	v	Railways (H)
328 (111.2 overs); Baba Indrajith 151 (233); Anureet Singh 5/104 (43.2 overs)		164 (65.5 overs); V. Cheluvaraj 66 (165); Aswin Crist 6/60 (17 overs)
77/2 (23.2 overs); Dinesh Karthik 43 (40); Anureet Singh 2/43 (12 overs)		240 (88.2 overs) (f/o); V. Cheluvaraj 88 (218); Rahil Shah 4/38 (19 overs)

Tamil Nadu won by 8 wickets
Karnail Singh Stadium, Delhi
Umpires: Anil Dandekar (Ind) and Rajesh Deshpande (Ind)
Player of the match: Baba Indrajith (Tamil Nadu)

- Railways won the toss and elected to field.
- Bhima Rao (Railways) made his first-class debut.

30 October–2 November
Scorecard

Madhya Pradesh	v	Baroda (H)
269 (111.2 overs); Rajat Patidar 60 (154); Swapnil Singh 4/61 (23.2 overs)		296 (113.2 overs); Aditya Waghmode 68 (237); Mihir Hirwani 5/60 (20.2 overs)
288/6d (68 overs); Rajat Patidar 101 (127); Swapnil Singh 4/94 (22 overs)		174 (48.4 overs); Yusuf Pathan 86 (98); Puneet Datey 4/20 (10 overs)

Madhya Pradesh won by 87 runs
Moti Bagh Stadium, Vadodara
Umpires: Puttarangaiah Jayapal (Ind) and Krishnaraj Srinath (Ind)
Player of the match: Mihir Hirwani (Madhya Pradesh)

- Madhya Pradesh won the toss and elected to bat.
- Rishi Arothe, Atit Sheth (Baroda) and Ankit Dane, Rajat Patidar (Madhya Pradesh) all made their first-class debuts.

30 October–2 November
Scorecard

Andhra Pradesh	v	Punjab (H)
80 (45 overs); Prasanth Kumar 33 (100); Gurkeerat Singh 4/14 (11 overs)		147 (55 overs); Jiwanjot Singh 59 (101); Prasanth Kumar 4/14 (7 overs)
133 (41.4 overs); Srikar Bharat 39 (45); Gurkeerat Singh 5/38 (11.4 overs)		67/3 (19.3 overs); Mandeep Singh 22* (33); Hanumappa Shivraj 1/10 (5 overs)

Punjab won by 7 wickets
Dhruve Pandove Stadium, Patiala
Umpires: Krishnamachari Bharatan (Ind) and Nikhil Patwardhan (Ind)
Player of the match: Gurkeerat Singh (Punjab)

- Andhra won the toss and elected to bat.
- Hanumappa Shivraj (Andhra) made his first-class debuts.

30 October–2 November
Scorecard

Uttar Pradesh	v	Gujarat (H)
273 (90.5 overs); Himanshu Asnora 57* (138); Rush Kalaria 3/51 (22)		100 (31.4 overs); Parthiv Patel 39 (59); Praveen Kumar 5/16 (10 overs)
257 (75.2 overs); Umang Sharma 66 (109); Axar Patel 5/90 (28 overs)		275 (59.4 overs); Manpreet Juneja 91 (101); Saurabh Kumar 5/106 (21.4 overs)

Uttar Pradesh won by 155 runs
Sardar Vallabhbhai Patel Stadium, Valsad
Umpires: Sivasubramaniyan Shankar (Ind) and Shavir Tarapore (Ind)
Player of the match: Saurabh Kumar (Uttar Pradesh)

- Uttar Pradesh won the toss and elected to bat.

=== Round 6 ===
7–10 November
Scorecard

Andhra Pradesh	v	Tamil Nadu (H)
203 (77.2 overs); A. G. Pradeep 78 (159); D. T. Chandrasekar 4/41 (21.2 overs)		164/7 (37 overs); Baba Indrajith 43 (51); Bodavarapu Sudhakar 2/44 (10 overs)

Match drawn
MA Chidambaram Stadium, Chennai
Umpires: Pashchim Pathak (Ind) and Tapan Sharma (Ind)
Player of the match: A. G. Pradeep (Andhra)

- Andhra won the toss and elected to bat.
- No play was possible on day 2 and 3 because of rain.
- Jyothi Krishna and Koripalli Sreekanth (Andhra) both made their first-class debuts.

7–10 November
Scorecard

Railways	v	Madhya Pradesh (H)
256 (82.4 overs); Saurabh Wakaskar 73 (124); Jalaj Saxena 8/96 (34.4 overs)		276 (90.2 overs); Rajat Patidar 113 (131); Karn Sharma 5/102 (29 overs)
131 (51.1 overs); Saurabh Wakaskar 26 (68); Jalaj Saxena 8/58 (26)		112/1 (19.1 overs); Jalaj Saxena 47* (57); Bhima Rao 1/20 (4 overs)

Madhya Pradesh won by 9 wickets
Captain Roop Singh Stadium, Gwalior
Umpires: Rajesh Deshpande (Ind) and Saiyed Khalid (Ind)
Player of the match: Jalaj Saxena (Madhya Pradesh)

- Railways won the toss and elected to bat.
- Jalaj Saxena's match figures of 16 for 154 are the second-best in the history of the Ranji Trophy.

7–10 November
Scorecard

Mumbai (H)	v	Uttar Pradesh
610/9d (153 overs); Shreyas Iyer 137 (110); Bhuvneshwar Kumar 2/99 (23 overs)		440 (151 overs); Himanshu Asnora 92 (262); Abhishek Nayar 4/63 (29 overs)
		140/1 (45 overs) (f/o); Himanshu Asnora 68* (136); Vishal Dabholkar 1/30 (10 overs)

Match drawn
Wankhede Stadium, Mumbai
Umpires: K. N. Ananthapadmanabhan (Ind) and Nand Kishore (Ind)
Player of the match: Shreyas Iyer (Mumbai)

- Uttar Pradesh won the toss and elected to field.

7–10 November
Scorecard

Gujarat (H)	v	Baroda
505 (148.2 overs); Priyank Kirit Panchal 128 (242); Irfan Pathan 6/47 (25.2 overs)		252 (82.3 overs); Irfan Pathan 58 (84); Axar Patel 3/81 (25.3 overs)
		207 (73.4 overs) (f/o); Hardik Pandya 43 (51); Rujul Bhatt 4/48 (14 overs)

Gujarat won by an innings and 46 runs
Sardar Vallabhbhai Patel Stadium, Valsad
Umpires: Chirra Ravikanthreddy (Ind) and R. Sundar (Ind)
Player of the match: Axar Patel (Gujarat)

- Gujarat won the toss and elected to bat.

=== Round 7 ===
15–18 November
Scorecard

Uttar Pradesh (H)	v	Tamil Nadu
348 (107.1 overs); Almas Shaukat 88 (203); Malolan Rangarajan 3/51 (23.1 overs)		231 (88 overs); Vijay Shankar 92 (188); Praveen Kumar 4/65 (27 overs)
273/5d (62 overs); Suresh Raina 145* (138); Baba Aparajith 2/73 (13 overs)		212/4 (84 overs); Abhinav Mukund 71 (155); Saurabh Kumar 2/30 (19 overs)

Match drawn
Green Park Stadium, Kanpur
Umpires: Umesh Dubey (Ind) and Amiesh Saheba (Ind)
Player of the match: Suresh Raina (Uttar Pradesh)

- Tamil Nadu won the toss and elected to field.

15–18 November
Scorecard

Gujarat (H)	v	Madhya Pradesh
311 (106.1 overs); Manpreet Juneja 61 (101); Jalaj Saxena 3/56 (29.1 overs)		200 (80.2 overs); Naman Ojha 56 (110); Jasprit Bumrah 3/46 (25 overs)
202/9d (74.3 overs); Manpreet Juneja 41 (107); Jalaj Saxena 6/60 (30.3 overs)		160 (49.5 overs); Ankit Sharma 55 (85); R. P. Singh 5/33 (12 overs)

Gujarat won by 153 runs
Lalabhai Contractor Stadium, Surat
Umpires: Chirra Ravikanthreddy (Ind) and S. Shankar (Ind)
Player of the match: R. P. Singh (Gujarat)

- Gujarat won the toss and elected to bat.

15–18 November
Scorecard

Baroda (H)	v	Punjab
475 (130.5 overs); Kedar Devdhar 186 (249); Deepak Bansal 3/57 (25 overs)		212 (65.5 overs); Uday Kaul 58 (147); Hardik Pandya 3/50 (14 overs)
		147 (38.4 overs) f/o Siddarth Kaul 40* (42); Irfan Pathan 3/19 (6.4 overs)

Baroda won by an innings and 116 runs
Moti Bagh Stadium, Vadodara
Umpires: Krishnamachari Bharatan (Ind) and Nitin Menon (Ind)
Player of the match: Kedar Devdhar (Baroda)

- Punjab won the toss and elected to field.
- Deepak Bansal (Punjab) made his first-class debut.

15–18 November
Scorecard

Railways	v	Mumbai (H)
217 (84.4 overs); Arindam Ghosh 67 (183); Shardul Thakur 4/38 (19 overs)		331 (95.4 overs); Akhil Herwadkar 145 (220); Karn Sharma 7/91 (31.4 overs)
408/4d (104 overs); Saurabh Wakaskar 185 (294); Vishal Dabholkar 3/115 (23 overs)		295/4 (64 overs); Shreyas Iyer 91 (112); Sagar Mishra 53 (12 overs)

Mumbai won by 6 wickets
Wankhede Stadium, Mumbai
Umpires: Jayaraman Madanagopal (Ind) and Shavir Tarapore (Ind)
Player of the match: Akhil Herwadkar (Mumbai)

- Railways won the toss and elected to bat.
- Jay Bista (Mumbai), Sagar Mishra, Akshat Pandey and Vivek Singh (Railways) all made their first-class debuts.

=== Round 8 ===
23–26 November
Scorecard

Gujarat	v	Tamil Nadu (H)
195/2d (63 overs); Priyank Kirit Panchal 90 (181); Malolan Rangarajan 1/39 (17 overs)

Match drawn
Indian Cement Company Ground, Tirunelveli
Umpires: Abhijit Deshmukh (Ind) and Virender Sharma (Ind)

- Tamil Nadu won the toss and elected to field.
- No play on days 1, 2 and 3 due to rain and a wet outfield.

23–26 November
Scorecard

Madhya Pradesh (H)	v	Mumbai
240 (75.1 overs); Harpreet Singh 59 (155); Ankush Jaiswal 4/63 (19 overs)		162 (38.1 overs); Jay Bista 27 (48); Jalaj Saxena 5/66 (19.1 overs)
201 (71.2 overs); Jalaj Saxena 79 (152); Shardul Thakur 3/33 (14 overs)		283/7 (77.3 overs); Jay Bista 74 (105); Jalaj Saxena 4/89 (27 overs)

Mumbai won by 3 wickets
Holkar Stadium, Indore
Umpires: Krishnaraj Srinath (Ind) and Krishnamachari Srinivasan (Ind)
Player of the match: Jay Bista (Mumbai)

- Madhya Pradesh won the toss and elected to bat.
- Ankush Jaiswal (Mumbai) made his first-class debut.
- Mumbai made their highest successful run-chase away from home in the Ranji Trophy and qualified for the quarter-finals as a result.

23–26 November
Scorecard

Punjab	v	Uttar Pradesh (H)
272 (90.3 overs); Mayank Sidhana 85 (141); Praveen Kumar 4/81 (30.3 overs)		226 (77.4 overs); Umang Sharma 49 (114); Siddarth Kaul 4/82 (21.4 overs)
295/7d (80 overs); Uday Kaul 109* (199); Ankit Rajpoot 3/67 (20 overs)		204/6 (72 overs); Akshdeep Nath 76 (210); Harbhajan Singh 2/57 (21 overs)

Match drawn
Green Park, Kanpur
Umpires: Anil Dandekar (Ind) and Bongani Jele (SA)
Player of the match: Mayank Sidhana (Punjab)

- Uttar Pradesh won the toss and elected to field.

23–26 November
Scorecard

Railways (H)	v	Andhra Pradesh
182 (64.4 overs); Saurabh Wakaskar 43 (69); Sneha Kishore 5/76 (24)		114 (50 overs); Prasanth Kumar 49 (100); Karn Sharma 5/30 (14 overs)
204 (69.2 overs); Ashish Yadav 62 (94); Bodavarapu Sudhakar 5/49 (12.2 overs)		124 (64.2 overs); Srikar Bharat 32 (76); Anureet Singh 4/32 (17 overs)

Railways won by 148 runs
Karnail Singh Stadium, Delhi
Umpires: Subrat Das (Ind) and Navdeep Singh (Ind)
Player of the match: Ashish Yadav (Railways)

- Andhra won the toss and elected to field.
- Sneha Kishore (Andhra) made his first-class debut.

=== Round 9 ===
1–4 December
Scorecard

Punjab	v	Tamil Nadu (H)
206 (57 overs); Yuvraj Singh 49 (63); D. T. Chandrasekar 3/43 (13 overs)		68 (23.4 overs); Jagatheesan Kousik 30 (36); Rajwinder Singh 6/29 (11.4 overs)
174 (42.5 overs); Gitansh Khera 43* (40); Malolan Rangarajan 4/53 (17 overs)		69 (22 overs); Baba Aparajith 32* (56); Harbhajan Singh 7/37 (11 overs)

Punjab won by 243 runs
NPR College Ground, Dindigul
Umpires: Pashchim Pathak (Ind) and John Ward (Aus)
Player of the match: Harbhajan Singh (Punjab)

- Punjab won the toss and elected to bat.
- In the 48th over of the match, umpire John Ward was hit on the head following a shot played by Barinder Sran (Punjab). He was replaced by Mohammad Raffik for the rest of the match.

1–4 December
Scorecard

Madhya Pradesh (H)	v	Andhra Pradesh
279 (92.5 overs); Rameez Khan 89 (158); Bandaru Ayyappa 5/66 (26 overs)		56 (38.2 overs); Ashwin Hebbar 13 (27); Ankit Sharma 6/17 (18 overs)
		214 (78.3 overs) f/o A. G. Pradeep 62 (129); Ankit Sharma 7/91 (30 overs)

Madhya Pradesh won by an innings and 9 runs
Holkar Cricket Stadium, Indore
Umpires: Vineet Kulkarni (Ind) and Alex Wharf (Eng)
Player of the match: Ankit Sharma (Madhya Pradesh)

- Madhya Pradesh won the toss and elected to bat.

1–4 December
Scorecard

Mumbai (H)	v	Gujarat
531 (141.2 overs); Akhil Herwadkar 192 (326); Axar Patel 3/99 (30.2 overs)		421 (139.4 overs); Bhargav Merai 166 (331); Shardul Thakur 6/107 (37 overs)
227/6 (65.1 overs); Nikhil Patil 44* (91); Rujul Bhatt 4/76 (25 overs)

Match drawn
Wankhede Stadium, Mumbai
Umpires: Abhijit Deshmukh (Ind) and Bongani Jele (SA)
Player of the match: Akhil Herwadkar (Mumbai)

- Gujarat won the toss and elected to field.
- Alshaaz Pathan (Gujarat) made his first-class debut.

1–4 December
Scorecard

Baroda	v	Uttar Pradesh (H)
321 (113.5 overs); Ambati Rayudu 70 (190); Piyush Chawla 3/41 (14 overs)		524 (152.1 overs); Umang Sharma 215 (423); Munaf Patel 2/42 (18 overs)
258/3 (68.4 overs); Aditya Waghmode 100* (219); Saurabh Kumar 1/56 (19 overs)

Match drawn
Greater Noida Cricket Stadium, Greater Noida
Umpires: K. N. Ananthapadmanabhan (Ind) and Sadashiv Iyer (Ind)
Player of the match: Umang Sharma (Uttar Pradesh)

- Baroda won the toss and elected to bat.
