= List of Punjab cricketers (India) =

Found below is the list of all cricketers who have played first-class, list A or Twenty20 cricket for Punjab cricket team. The seasons given are the first and last seasons in which they have played; without the player not necessarily playing in all the intervening seasons. Players in bold have played an international cricket game.

Last updated at the end of the 2015/16 season.

== A ==
- Love Ablish, 2004/05-2011/12
- Monish Agarwal, 1989/90
- Sanjeev Agarwal, 1986/87-1987/88
- Amanpreet Singh, 2006/07-2008/09
- **Mohinder Amarnath**, 1969/70-1973/74
- Rajinder Amarnath, 1976/77
- **Surinder Amarnath**, 1968/69-1973/74
- Amitoze Singh, 2010/11-2014/15
- Amrinder Singh, 2000/01
- Anmolpreet Singh, 2014/15
- Devender Arora, 1981/82
- Monish Arora, 1990/91-1995/96
- Rajiv Arora, 1980/81
- **Arshdeep Singh,** 2022-present
- **Abhishek Sharma**, 2024-present

== B ==
- Balbir Singh, 1968/69-1977/78
- Balkar Singh, 1982/83-1986/87
- Baltej Singh, 2011/12-2015/16
- Balwant Singh, 1972/73
- Deepak Bansal, 2014/15-2015/16
- Harmeet Singh Bansal, 2008/09-2015/16
- Arun Bedi, 1990/91-1996/97
- Emmanuel Benjamin, 1973/74-1977/78
- Vishwas Bhalla, 2008/09-2010/11
- Manish Bhatia, 2011/12
- Moti Lal Behal, 1970/71
- **Bhupinder Singh**, 1987/88-1999/00
- Bhupinder Singh, 1989/90-1997/98
- Bharat Bhushan, 1996/97-2000/01
- Binwant Singh, 2004/05
- Birinder Singh, 2007/08

== C ==
- Ravinder Chadha, 1968/69-1969/70
- KS Chamanlal, 1974/75
- Malhotra Chamanlal, 1968/69-1970/71
- Charanjeet Singh, 2007/08-2008/09
- Charanjit Singh, 1973/74
- Vedraj Chauhan, 1974/75-1978/79
- Himanshu Chawla, 2009/10-2015/16
- Ashok Chopra, 1970/71
- Deepak Chopra, 1972/73-1988/89
- Sapan Chopra, 1986/87-1992/93
- Vinay Choudhary, 2011/12-2014/15

== D ==
- Gundeep Deol, 1995/96-1996/97
- Meghraj Dhannu, 1968/69
- **Pankaj Dharmani**, 1992/93-2010/11
- Rajinder Dhawan, 1976/77-1977/78
- Sanjay Dhull, 2001/02
- Dilraj Singh, 1990/91
- Yogesh Dutta, 1977/78-1985/86

== G ==
- Gagandeep Singh, 1999/00-2009/10
- Gaurav Gambhir, 2008/09-2009/10
- Baldev Gandhi, 1969/70-1972/73
- **Rajinder Ghai**, 1979/80-1988/89
- Shubek Gill, 2014/15
- **Shubman Gill**, 2019-present
- Karan Goel, 2005/06-2012/13
- **Manpreet Gony**, 2007/08-2014/15
- Gaurav Gupta, 2003/04-2006/07
- Kamal Gupta, 1969/70-1970/71
- Gurender Singh, 2010/11-2015/16
- Gurinder Singh, 1985/86
- **Gurkeerat Singh**, 2011/12-2015/16
- Gurkirat Singh, 2008/09-2012/13
- Gurpreet Singh, 1987/88
- **Gursharan Singh**, 1986/87-1994/95

== H ==
- Rakesh Handa, 1978/79-1982/83
- **Harbhajan Singh**, 1997/98-2015/16
- Harjinder Singh, 1984/85-1986/87
- Harminder Singh, 1968/69-1970/71
- Harminder Singh, 1998/99-2002/03
- Harpreet Singh, 1993/94
- Harman Harry, 1998/99
- **Harvinder Singh**, 1995/96-1998/99

== J ==
- Jaideep Singh, 1991/92-1993/94
- Jasbir Singh, 1968/69-1976/77
- Jaskaran Singh, 2008/09-2015/16
- Jaskaranvir Singh, 2014/15
- Jaspal Singh, 1988/89-1991/92
- Jiwanjot Singh, 2012/13-2015/16
- Joginder Singh, 1972/73-1974/75
- Narinder Joshi, 1970/71
- Ankur Jund, 2007/08-2009/10

== K ==
- Karan Kaila, 2015/16
- Ankur Kakkar, 1999/00-2009/10
- Amit Kakria, 2003/04
- Harminder Kaku, 1997/98
- Hari Kali, 2001/02
- Prem Kalia, 1969/70
- Sumit Kalia, 2006/07
- Rajdeep Kalsi, 1985/86-1994/95
- Obaid Kamal, 1993/94-1995/96
- Neeraj Kamal, 1980/81
- Sarul Kanwar, 2010/11-2011/12
- Ashwini Kapoor, 1987/88-1990/91
- **Aashish Kapoor**, 1993/94-1997/98
- Chander Kapoor, 1969/70
- Lalit Kapoor, 1998/99
- Sanjeev Kapuria, 1997/98
- Siddarth Kaul, 2007/08-2015/16
- Uday Kaul, 2005/06-2015/16
- Ashok Kaushal, 1968/69-1970/71
- Amarjeet Kaypee, 1980/81-1985/86
- Aijaz Khan, 1971/72-1974/75
- Sunil Khanna, 1978/79-1981/82
- Upinder Khanna, 1972/73-1974/75
- Varun Khanna, 2008/09-2015/16
- Gitansh Khera, 2010/11-2015/16
- Surinder Kohli, 1970/71
- Taruwar Kohli, 2008/09-2014/15
- Kulwant Singh, 1985/86
- Babloo Kumar, 2000/01-2001/02
- Rajinder Kumar, 1971/72-1972/73
- Sanjay Kumar, 1998/99-1999/00
- Satish Kumar, 1978/79-1985/86
- Umesh Kumar, 1969/70-1985/86

== L ==
- Sarabjit Ladda, 2007/08-2015/16
- Lakhbir Singh, 1997/98-1999/00
- Akash Lal, 1969/70-1975/76
- Bhandari Lal, 1978/79-1982/83
- Chaman Lal, 1995/96-1996/97
- Girdhari Lal, 1977/78-1983/84
- **Madan Lal**, 1968/69-1971/72
- Madan Lal, 1985/86
- Bharat Lumba, 2007/08-2010/11
- Sharad Lumba, 2013/14
- Suresh Luthra, 1980/81

== M ==
- Chandan Madan, 2002/03-2012/13
- Sanjay Mahajan, 1996/97-2003/04
- Vivek Mahajan, 1999/00-2001/02
- Mahesh Inder Singh, 1977/78-1991/92
- Anmol Malhotra, 2015/16
- Ishan Malhotra, 2001/02-2011/12
- Mandeep Singh, 1994/95-1995/96
- Mandeep Singh, 2009/10-2015/16
- Jeet Maninder Singh, 2014/15-2015/16
- Manmohan Singh, 1971/72-1972/73
- Ramesh Manna, 1970/71
- Jagroop Marlin, 1968/69-1974/75
- Ajay Mehra, 1989/90-1997/98
- Manav Mehra, 1993/94-1997/98
- Samir Mehra, 1988/89-1992/93
- **Vijay Mehra**, 1970/71-1974/75
- Ashwini Minna, 1975/76-1979/80
- Sanjay Mishra, 1978/79
- Krishnan Mohan, 1987/88-1995/96
- **Dinesh Mongia**, 1995/96-2006/07

== N ==
- Navdeep Singh, 1997/98-2010/11

== P ==
- Dhruv Pandove, 1987/88-1991/92
- M. P. Pandove, 1968/69-1977/78
- Parampal Singh, 1985/86-1986/87
- Amit Parashar, 2010/11
- Pargat Singh, 2015/16
- Harish Puri, 2001/02
- Raj Puri, 1986/87-1987/88
- **Prabhjot Sidhu**, 2021-2022 (Now Plays)

== R ==
- Dharam Raj, 1977/78
- Tilak Raj, 1972/73-1974/75
- **Rajinder Pal**, 1968/69-1969/70
- Rajinder Pal Singh, 1999/00
- Rajwinder Singh, 2008/09-2015/16
- Ralia Ram, 1970/71
- Ranbir Singh, 1980/81
- Rakesh Rathore, 1981/82-1985/86
- **Vikram Rathour**, 1988/89-2001/02
- Ravinder Rana, 1979/80
- Ravi Inder Singh, 2007/08-2014/15
- Ashwini Razdan, 1971/72-1979/80
- Ravneet Ricky, 1997/98-2008/09

== S ==
- Sunil Saggi, 1986/87-1987/88
- Narinder Saini, 1968/69
- Rakesh Saini, 1995/96-1999/00
- Harmeet Saini, 1994/95-1995/96
- Hardavinder Sandhu, 2005/06
- Kailash Sanwal, 1998/99-2001/02
- Sandeep Sanwal, 1998/99-2005/06
- Gaganinder Singh, 1998/99-1999/00
- Sarabjit Singh, 1968/69
- Sarabjit Singh, 2005/06-2006/07
- Sarabjit Singh Maan, 1996/97
- **Sarandeep Singh**, 1998/99-2000/01
- Sarjinder Pal Singh, 2002/03-2004/05
- Abhinav Sharma, 2020/21
- Amit Sharma, 1992/93-1999/00
- Arun Sharma, 1978/79-1993/94
- Bipul Sharma, 2003/04-2012/13
- Manish Sharma, 2000/01-2006/07
- **Rahul Sharma**, 2006/07-2013/14
- Rajesh Sharma, 2002/03-2006/07
- Rakesh Sharma, 1980/81
- Ranjeev Sharma, 1993/94-1994/95
- Samrat Sharma, 2002/03-2003/04
- **Sandeep Sharma**, 2011/12-2014/15
- Sandeep Sharma, 1994/95-2000/01
- Sudhir Sharma, 1994/95-1995/96
- Suresh Sharma, 1976/77-1980/81
- Vineet Sharma, 1999/00-2005/06
- Vineet Sharma, 1997/98-1999/00
- Vinod Sharma, 1968/69-1978/79
- **Yashpal Sharma**, 1973/74-1986/87
- Parshottam Shukla, 1975/76-1976/77
- Mayank Sidhana, 2007/08-2015/16
- Navdeep Sidhu, 2010/11-2014/15
- **Navjot Singh Sidhu**, 1981/82-1999/00
- **V. R. V. Singh**, 2003/04-2013/14
- Ram Singla, 1972/73-1975/76
- Ankur Sodhi, 2001/02
- **Reetinder Singh Sodhi**, 1996/97-2010/11
- Sunny Sohal, 2005/06-2013/14
- **Barinder Sran**, 2011/12-2015/16
- Surindernath, 1968/69-1972/73
- Shubman Gill,2021/2024

== T ==
- Sarkar Talwar, 1969/70
- Swamy Talwar, 1968/69-1971/72
- Tejinder Pal Singh, 1998/99
- Sukhvinder Tinku, 1988/89
- Arun Tuli, 1996/97

== U ==
- Amit Uniyal, 2001/02-2010/11

== V ==
- Bharati Vij, 1987/88-1997/98
- Manan Vohra, 2011/12-2015/16

== Y ==
- **Yograj Singh**, 1977/78-1984/85
- **Yuvraj Singh**, 1996/97-2015/16
