= 2020–21 Vijay Hazare Trophy Group B =

Cricket tournament

- Dates: 20 – 28 February 2021
- Administrator: BCCI
- Cricket format: List A cricket
- Tournament format: Round-robin
- Participants: 6

The 2020–21 Vijay Hazare Trophy was the 19th season of the Vijay Hazare Trophy, a List A cricket tournament in India. It was contested by 38 teams, divided into six groups, with six teams in Group B. Andhra Pradesh, Jharkhand, Madhya Pradesh, Punjab, Tamil Nadu and Vidarbha were placed in Group B, with all the matches taking place in Indore.

On the opening day of the tournament, Jharkhand made the highest total in the Vijay Hazare Trophy. However, this was beaten five days later, when Mumbai made 457/4 against Puducherry. Andhra Pradesh won Group B to qualify for the knockout stage of the tournament.

== Points table ==
Team	Pld	W	L	T	NR	Pts	NRR
Andhra Pradesh (Q)	5	3	2	0	0	12	+0.732
Tamil Nadu	5	3	2	0	0	12	+0.650
Jharkhand	5	3	2	0	0	12	+0.295
Madhya Pradesh	5	3	2	0	0	12	–0.466
Punjab	5	2	3	0	0	8	–0.083
Vidarbha	5	1	4	0	0	4	–1.078

- Top team advanced to the Knockout Stage

== Fixtures ==
=== Round 1 ===
20 February 2021
Scorecard

Punjab; 288/4 (50 overs)	v	Tamil Nadu; 289/4 (49 overs)
Gurkeerat Singh Mann 139* (121); Baba Aparajith 1/15 (3 overs)		Narayan Jagadeesan 101 (103); Siddarth Kaul 2/47 (8 overs)

Tamil Nadu won by 6 wickets
Emerald High School Ground, Indore
Umpires: Ganesh Charhate and Pashchim Pathak

- Tamil Nadu won the toss and elected to field.
- Manimaran Siddharth and Sonu Yadav (Tamil Nadu) both made their List A debuts.

20 February 2021
Scorecard

Jharkhand; 422/9 (50 overs)	v	Madhya Pradesh; 98 (18.4 overs)
Ishan Kishan 173 (94); Gaurav Yadav 4/73 (9 overs)		Abhishek Bhandari 42 (57); Varun Aaron 6/37 (5.4 overs)

Jharkhand won by 324 runs
Holkar Stadium, Indore
Umpires: Nand Kishore and Subrat Das

- Madhya Pradesh won the toss and elected to field.
- Aditya Shrivastava (Madhya Pradesh), Bal Krishna, Kumar Kushagra and Rajandeep Singh (Jharkhand) all made their List A debuts.

20 February 2021
Scorecard

Vidarbha; 331/6 (50 overs)	v	Andhra; 332/7 (49.2 overs)
Faiz Fazal 100 (105); Cheepurapalli Stephen 3/66 (10 overs)		Ricky Bhui 101* (78); Darshan Nalkande 3/76 (10 overs)

Andhra won by 3 wickets
SS Cricket Commune, Indore
Umpires: Saiyed Khalid and Satrajit Lahiri

- Andhra won the toss and elected to field.
- Harishankar Reddy and Nitish Kumar Reddy (Andhra) both made their List A debuts.

=== Round 2 ===
22 February 2021
Scorecard

Jharkhand; 217/9 (50 overs)	v	Punjab; 215 (45.5 overs)
Utkarsh Singh 51 (78); Siddarth Kaul 3/44 (10 overs)		Mandeep Singh 68 (88); Rahul Shukla 2/34 (10 overs)

Jharkhand won by 2 runs
SS Cricket Commune, Indore
Umpires: Saiyed Khalid and Satrajit Lahiri

- Jharkhand won the toss and elected to bat.
- Abhinav Sharma (Punjab) made his List A debut.

22 February 2021
Scorecard

Tamil Nadu; 176 (41.3 overs)	v	Andhra; 181/3 (29.1 overs)
Baba Aparajith 40 (62); Shoaib Md Khan 3/24 (6.3 overs)		Ashwin Hebbar 101* (84); Ragupathy Silambarasan 2/31 (8 overs)

Andhra won by 7 wickets
Holkar Stadium, Indore
Umpires: Ganesh Charhate and Pashchim Pathak

- Andhra won the toss and elected to field.
- Ragupathy Silambarasan (Tamil Nadu) made his List A debut.

22 February 2021
Scorecard

Madhya Pradesh; 243/9 (50 overs)	v	Vidarbha; 246/6 (48.5 overs)
Parth Sahani 68* (58); Aditya Sarwate 3/39 (10 overs)		Ganesh Satish 47 (66); Gaurav Yadav 1/44 (8 overs)

Vidarbha won by 4 wickets
Emerald High School Ground, Indore
Umpires: Abhijit Bengeri and Shaktipada Bhattacharya

- Madhya Pradesh won the toss and elected to bat.

=== Round 3 ===
24 February 2021
Scorecard

Vidarbha; 288/9 (50 overs)	v	Jharkhand; 294/7 (49.3 overs)
Sanjay Raghunath 82 (95); Vikash Singh 4/65 (10 overs)		Kumar Deobrat 100 (103); Saurabh Dubey 3/59 (10 overs)

Jharkhand won by 3 wickets
SS Cricket Commune, Indore
Umpires: Abhijit Bengeri and Shaktipada Bhattacharya

- Jharkhand won the toss and elected to field.

24 February 2021
Scorecard

Andhra; 175 (48.1 overs)	v	Punjab; 176/3 (36 overs)
Nitish Kumar Reddy 30 (49); Siddarth Kaul 4/27 (9.1 overs)		Mandeep Singh 64* (81); Shoaib Md Khan 2/38 (10 overs)

Punjab won by 7 wickets
Emerald High School Ground, Indore
Umpires: Ganesh Charhate and Pashchim Pathak

- Punjab won the toss and elected to field.

24 February 2021
Scorecard

Madhya Pradesh; 225 (48.2 overs)	v	Tamil Nadu; 211 (49 overs)
Parth Sahani 46 (57); M. Mohammed 3/39 (7 overs)		Shahrukh Khan 67* (77); Mihir Hirwani 2/42 (10 overs)

Madhya Pradesh won by 14 runs
Holkar Stadium, Indore
Umpires: Nand Kishore and Subrat Das

- Tamil Nadu won the toss and elected to field.
- Arshad Khan (Madhya Pradesh) made his List A debut.

=== Round 4 ===
26 February 2021
Scorecard

Madhya Pradesh; 316/8 (50 overs)	v	Andhra; 218 (42.3 overs)
Rajat Patidar 102 (61); K. V. Sasikanth 3/46 (10 overs)		Nitish Kumar Reddy 59 (67); Mihir Hirwani 4/50 (8.3 overs)

Madhya Pradesh won by 98 runs
Emerald High School Ground, Indore
Umpires: Nand Kishore and Subrat Das

- Andhra won the toss and elected to field.
- Chengalpet Gnaneshwar (Andhra) made his List A debut.

26 February 2021
Scorecard

Vidarbha; 290/9 (50 overs)	v	Punjab; 294/6 (47.5 overs)
Faiz Fazal 101 (99); Harpreet Brar 4/43 (9 overs)		Prabhsimran Singh 167* (140); Saurabh Dubey 2/50 (9 overs)

Punjab won by 4 wickets
Holkar Stadium, Indore
Umpires: Saiyed Khalid and Satrajit Lahiri

- Punjab won the toss and elected to field.
- Nachiket Bhute (Vidarbha) made his List A debut.

26 February 2021
Scorecard

Tamil Nadu; 266/7 (50 overs)	v	Jharkhand; 199/9 (50 overs)
Jagatheesan Kousik 55 (40); Anukul Roy 3/41 (10 overs)		Virat Singh 49 (63); Manimaran Siddharth 3/33 (10 overs)

Tamil Nadu won by 67 runs
Daly College Ground, Indore
Umpires: Abhijit Bengeri and Shaktipada Bhattacharya

- Tamil Nadu won the toss and elected to bat.
- Pradosh Ranjan Paul (Tamil Nadu) made his List A debut.

=== Round 5 ===
28 February 2021
Scorecard

Vidarbha; 150 (41 overs)	v	Tamil Nadu; 152/5 (11.2 overs)
Akshay Wadkar 31 (52); Jagatheesan Kousik 3/22 (7 overs)		Narayan Jagadeesan 48 (18); Saurabh Dubey 2/49 (3 overs)

Tamil Nadu won by 5 wickets
Emerald High School Ground, Indore
Umpires: Nand Kishore and Subrat Das

- Tamil Nadu won the toss and elected to field.
- Harsh Dubey (Vidarbha) and Laxmesha Suryaprakash (Tamil Nadu) both made their List A debuts.

28 February 2021
Scorecard

Jharkhand; 139 (46.2 overs)	v	Andhra; 140/3 (9.5 overs)
Ishan Kishan 38 (68); Harishankar Reddy 4/30 (9.2 overs)		Ricky Bhui 57* (27); Rahul Shukla 1/19 (2 overs)

Andhra won by 7 wickets
Daly College Ground, Indore
Umpires: Ganesh Charhate and Pashchim Pathak

- Andhra won the toss and elected to field.

28 February 2021
Scorecard

Madhya Pradesh; 402/3 (50 overs)	v	Punjab; 297 (42.3 overs)
Venkatesh Iyer 198 (146); Siddarth Kaul 1/88 (10 overs)		Abhishek Sharma 104 (49); Mihir Hirwani 4/62 (10 overs)

Madhya Pradesh won by 105 runs
Holkar Stadium, Indore
Umpires: Saiyed Khalid and Satrajit Lahiri

- Madhya Pradesh won the toss and elected to bat.
