= List of 2014 Indian Premier League personnel changes =

This is a list of all personnel changes for the 2014 Indian Premier League(IPL). This was the second season after 2011 to have all players, apart from a selection of retained players, return to the auction pool (first in 2011).

== Retirement ==
Date	Name	Team(s) played (years)	Age	Notes
18 May 2013	Adam Gilchrist	Deccan Chargers (2008–2010); Kings XI Punjab (2011–2013)	41	
October 2013	Ricky Ponting	Kolkata Knight Riders (2008); Mumbai Indians (2013)	38	Was not included in the squad for the 2013 Champions League Twenty20
6 October 2013	Sachin Tendulkar	Mumbai Indians (2008–2013)	40	
6 October 2013	Rahul Dravid	Royal Challengers Bangalore(2008–2010); Rajasthan Royals (2011–2013)	40	

== Retained players ==
All IPL franchise teams were allowed to retain a maximum of five players (at most four Indian capped players) and the rest of the players entered the auction pool. Teams had until 10 January 2014 to announce their list of retained players.

Team summary
Team	Retained	Rights to match	Salary cap deduction	Purse Left
Bangalore	3	1	₹29.5 crores (US$4.76 m)	₹30.5 crores
Chennai	5	1	₹39 crores (US$6.29 m)	₹21 crores
Delhi	0	3	₹0 crores	₹60 crores
Hyderabad	2	2	₹22 crores (US$3.55 m)	₹38 crores
Punjab	2	2	₹16.5 crores (US$2.66 m)	₹43.5 crores
Kolkata	2	2	₹22 crores (US$3.55 m)	₹38 crores
Mumbai	5	1	₹39 crores (US$6.29 m)	₹21 crores
Rajasthan	5	1	₹37.5 crores (US$6.05 m)	₹22.5 crores

Nat	Player	Team	Price In INR lakh
(India)	Mahendra Singh Dhoni	Chennai Super Kings	1250
(India)	Suresh Raina	Chennai Super Kings	950
(India)	Ravichandran Ashwin	Chennai Super Kings	750
(India)	Ravindra Jadeja	Chennai Super Kings	550
(Trinidad and Tobago)	Dwayne Bravo	Chennai Super Kings	400
(South Africa)	David Miller	Kings XI Punjab	1250
(India)	Manan Vohra	Kings XI Punjab	400
(India)	Gautam Gambhir	Kolkata Knight Riders	1250
(Trinidad and Tobago)	Sunil Narine	Kolkata Knight Riders	950
(India)	Rohit Sharma	Mumbai Indians	1250
(Sri Lanka)	Lasith Malinga	Mumbai Indians	950
(Trinidad and Tobago)	Kieron Pollard	Mumbai Indians	750
(India)	Harbhajan Singh	Mumbai Indians	550
(India)	Ambati Rayudu	Mumbai Indians	400
(Australia)	Shane Watson	Rajasthan Royals	1250
(Australia)	James Faulkner	Rajasthan Royals	950
(India)	Ajinkya Rahane	Rajasthan Royals	750
(India)	Stuart Binny	Rajasthan Royals	550
(India)	Sanju Samson	Rajasthan Royals	400
(India)	Virat Kohli	Royal Challengers Bangalore	1250
(Jamaica)	Chris Gayle	Royal Challengers Bangalore	950
(South Africa)	AB de Villiers	Royal Challengers Bangalore	750
(India)	Shikhar Dhawan	Sunrisers Hyderabad	1250
(South Africa)	Dale Steyn	Sunrisers Hyderabad	950

== Auction ==
The players auction took place on 12 and 13 February at Bangalore. On 12 February, capped players (players that were selected to play for their home country anytime before) were auctioned. Next day uncapped players were auctioned. Franchise-selected unsold capped and uncapped players were auctioned at the end of 2nd day.

A total of 912 players entered the auction. On 29 January 2014, the first list of 233 capped players was announced in the auction but the list did not contain any Pakistani players while big names such as Michael Clarke, Stuart Broad and Kumar Sangakkara were conspicuous by their absence. On 30 January 2014, the list was updated with uncapped players making a long list of 895 players (224 capped and 651 uncapped) which had to be shortlisted by IPL teams for auction by 3 February. Pinal Shah who was mistakenly added in the list of capped players in first list was moved to list of uncapped players. Three international associate players were kept in list of uncapped players but Ryan ten Doeschate, only associate player who has played in IPL, was kept in the list of capped players. The list was shortlisted to 514 players including 219 capped players (50 Indians and 169 overseas players) and 292 uncapped players (255 Indians and 37 overseas players) by IPL teams. Three associate capped players including Ryan ten Doeschate were kept under the uncapped section. Seventeen players (6 capped foreigners and 10 uncapped Indians) including names like Kemar Roach and Rikki Clarke who were not in the initial player lists were also added to the final auction list. After withdrawal of three capped players, the list was further shortened to 511 players (216 capped and 295 uncapped).

=== Summary ===
154 players (104 Indians and 50 Overseas) were sold at auction. Yuvraj Singh fetched the highest bid of ₹14 crore (US$1.5 million). Kevin Pietersen was the most costly foreign player. Among uncapped players Karn Sharma was most expensive at ₹3.75 crore (US$390,000). Many prominent Indian players such as Praveen Kumar, Subramaniam Badrinath, Abhimanyu Mithun and R. P. Singh remain unsold. Almost all current Sri Lankan and English cricketers including the names of Mahela Jayawardene, Tillakaratne Dilshan, Ian Bell and Alex Hales remain unsold.

Team summary
Team	Funds Remaining (₹ in Lacs)	Rights to Match Used	In Auction			Overall (including Retained)		
Team	Funds Remaining (₹ in Lacs)	Rights to Match Used	Uncapped Players	Overseas Players	Total Players	Uncapped Players	Overseas Players	Total Players
Chennai	20	1	6	7	15	6	8	20
Delhi	0	3	8	7	23	8	7	23
Punjab	410	2	10	6	21	11	7	23
Kolkata	100	2	8	7	19	8	8	21
Mumbai	5	1	9	6	16	9	8	21
Rajasthan	555	1	14	6	20	15	8	25
Bangalore	0	1	9	5	18	9	7	21
Hyderabad	100	2	10	6	22	10	7	24

Maximum overseas players: 9; Maximum squad size: 27; Budget:₹60 Crore

=== Sold players ===
The players were auctioned in sets. Sets 1 and 2 consisted of marquee players such as Virender Sehwag, Yuvraj Singh, Jacques Kallis and Kevin Pietersen. Other players, capped (sets 3–24) and uncapped (sets 25–53) were categorized according to their specialisation:

Specialisation	Capped sets	Uncapped sets
Batsmen	3, 8, 13, 17 and 20	25, 30, 35, 40, 44, 47, 49, 51 and 53
Fast bowlers	6, 11, 15, 19, 22, 23 and 24	28, 33, 38, 42, 46, 48, 50 and 52
Spin bowlers	7, 12 and 16	29, 34, 39 and 43
All-rounders	5, 10, 14, 18 and 21	27, 32, 37, 41 and 45
Wicketkeepers	4 and 9	26, 31 and 36

Set No	Set	Name	Country	IPL Matches	IPL Team(s)	IPL 2013 Team	Capped / Uncapped	Reserve Price in Lakhs in INR	IPL 2014 Team	Auctioned Price in Lakhs in INR
1	M1	Mitchell Johnson	Australia	17	Mumbai Indians	Mumbai Indians	Capped	200	Kings XI Punjab	650
1	M1	Jacques Kallis	South Africa	90	Royal Challengers Bangalore / Kolkata Knight Riders	Kolkata Knight Riders	Capped	200	Kolkata Knight Riders	550
1	M1	Kevin Pietersen	England	21	Deccan Chargers / Delhi Daredevils / Royal Challengers Bangalore	Delhi Daredevils	Capped	200	Delhi Daredevils	900
1	M1	Virender Sehwag	India	79	Delhi Daredevils	Delhi Daredevils	Capped	200	Kings XI Punjab	320
1	M1	Yuvraj Singh	India	70	Kings XI Punjab / Pune Warriors India	Pune Warriors India	Capped	200	Royal Challengers Bangalore	1,400
1	M1	Murali Vijay	India	64	Chennai Super Kings	Chennai Super Kings	Capped	200	Delhi Daredevils	500
1	M1	David Warner	Australia	55	Delhi Daredevils	Delhi Daredevils	Capped	150	Sunrisers Hyderabad	550
2	M2	George Bailey	Australia	4	Chennai Super Kings	Chennai Super Kings	Capped	200	Kings XI Punjab	325
2	M2	Faf du Plessis	South Africa	13	Chennai Super Kings	Chennai Super Kings	Capped	150	Chennai Super Kings	475
2	M2	Michael Hussey	Australia	46	Chennai Super Kings	Chennai Super Kings	Capped	200	Mumbai Indians	500
2	M2	Dinesh Karthik	India	92	Delhi Daredevils / Kings XI Punjab / Mumbai Indians	Mumbai Indians	Capped	200	Delhi Daredevils	1,250
2	M2	Zaheer Khan	India	64	Mumbai Indians / Royal Challengers Bangalore	Royal Challengers Bangalore	Capped	100	Mumbai Indians	260
2	M2	Brendon McCullum	New Zealand	48	Kochi Tuskers Kerala / Kolkata Knight Riders	Kolkata Knight Riders	Capped	200	Chennai Super Kings	325
2	M2	Amit Mishra	India	76	Deccan Chargers / Delhi Daredevils / Sunrisers Hyderabad	Sunrisers Hyderabad	Capped	200	Sunrisers Hyderabad	475
2	M2	Darren Sammy	Saint Lucia	10	Sunrisers Hyderabad	Sunrisers Hyderabad	Capped	100	Sunrisers Hyderabad	350
3	BA1	Jean-Paul Duminy	South Africa	39	Deccan Chargers / Mumbai Indians / Sunrisers Hyderabad	Sunrisers Hyderabad	Capped	100	Delhi Daredevils	220
3	BA1	Aaron Finch	Australia	23	Rajasthan Royals / Delhi Daredevils / Pune Warriors India	Pune Warriors India	Capped	100	Sunrisers Hyderabad	400
3	BA1	Brad Hodge	Australia	62	Kochi Tuskers Kerala / Kolkata Knight Riders / Rajasthan Royals	Rajasthan Royals	Capped	200	Rajasthan Royals	240
3	BA1	Shaun Marsh	Australia	50	Kings XI Punjab	Kings XI Punjab	Capped	200	Kings XI Punjab	220
3	BA1	Cheteshwar Pujara	India	24	Kolkata Knight Riders / Royal Challengers Bangalore	Royal Challengers Bangalore	Capped	150	Kings XI Punjab	190
3	BA1	Dwayne Smith	Barbados	35	Deccan Chargers / Mumbai Indians	Mumbai Indians	Capped	150	Chennai Super Kings	450
3	BA1	Ross Taylor	New Zealand	51	Royal Challengers Bangalore / Rajasthan Royals / Delhi Daredevils / Pune Warriors India	Pune Warriors India	Capped	200	Delhi Daredevils	200
3	BA1	Manoj Tiwary	India	65	Delhi Daredevils / Kolkata Knight Riders	Kolkata Knight Riders	Capped	200	Delhi Daredevils	280
3	BA1	Robin Uthappa	India	91	Mumbai Indians / Pune Warriors India / Royal Challengers Bangalore	Pune Warriors India	Capped	200	Kolkata Knight Riders	500
4	WK1	Quinton de Kock	South Africa	3	Sunrisers Hyderabad	Sunrisers Hyderabad	Capped	100	Delhi Dardevils	350
4	WK1	Naman Ojha	India	56	Delhi Daredevils / Rajasthan Royals	Delhi Daredevils	Capped	50	Sunrisers Hyderabad	50
4	WK1	Parthiv Patel	India	67	Chennai Super Kings / Deccan Chargers / Kochi Tuskers Kerala / Sunrisers Hyderabad	Sunrisers Hyderabad	Capped	100	Royal Challengers Bangalore	275
4	WK1	Wriddhiman Saha	India	47	Kolkata Knight Riders / Chennai Super Kings	Chennai Super Kings	Capped	100	Kings XI Punjab	220
5	AL1	Shakib Al Hasan	Bangladesh	15	Kolkata Knight Riders	Kolkata Knight Riders	Capped	100	Kolkata Knight Riders	280
5	AL1	Albie Morkel	South Africa	78	Chennai Super Kings	Chennai Super Kings	Capped	150	Royal Challengers Bangalore	240
5	AL1	Irfan Pathan	India	88	Delhi Daredevils / Kings XI Punjab	Delhi Daredevils	Capped	150	Sunrisers Hyderabad	240
5	AL1	Yusuf Pathan	India	91	Kolkata Knight Riders / Rajasthan Royals	Kolkata Knight Riders	Capped	200	Kolkata Knight Riders	325
5	AL1	Thisara Perera	Sri Lanka	23	Chennai Super Kings / Kochi Tuskers Kerala / Mumbai Indians / Sunrisers Hyderabad	Sunrisers Hyderabad	Capped	50	Kings XI Punjab	160
5	AL1	Steve Smith	Australia	22	Kochi Tuskers Kerala / Royal Challengers Bangalore / Pune Warriors India	Pune Warriors India	Capped	200	Rajasthan Royals	400
6	FA1	Ashok Dinda	India	55	Delhi Daredevils / Kolkata Knight Riders / Pune Warriors India	Pune Warriors India	Capped	100	Royal Challengers Bangalore	150
6	FA1	Bhuvneshwar Kumar	India	31	Royal Challengers Bangalore / Pune Warriors India	Pune Warriors India	Capped	150	Sunrisers Hyderabad	425
6	FA1	Morne Morkel	South Africa	41	Rajasthan Royals / Delhi Daredevils	Delhi Daredevils	Capped	150	Kolkata Knight Riders	280
6	FA1	Ravi Rampaul	Trinidad and Tobago	10	Royal Challengers Bangalore	Royal Challengers Bangalore	Capped	50	Royal Challengers Bangalore	90
6	FA1	Mohammed Shami	India	3	Kolkata Knight Riders	Kolkata Knight Riders	Capped	100	Delhi Dardevils	425
6	FA1	Ishant Sharma	India	59	Deccan Chargers / Kolkata Knight Riders / Sunrisers Hyderabad	Sunrisers Hyderabad	Capped	150	Sunrisers Hyderabad	425
6	FA1	Mitchell Starc	Australia	0			Capped	200	Royal Challengers Bangalore	500
6	FA1	Ranganath Vinay Kumar	India	77	Kochi Tuskers Kerala / Royal Challengers Bangalore	Royal Challengers Bangalore	Capped	150	Kolkata Knight Riders	280
6	FA1	Umesh Yadav	India	47	Delhi Daredevils	Delhi Daredevils	Capped	100	Kolkata Knight Riders	260
7	SP1	Piyush Chawla	India	87	Kings XI Punjab	Kings XI Punjab	Capped	50	Kolkata Knight Riders	425
7	SP1	Murali Kartik	India	54	Kolkata Knight Riders / Pune Warriors India / Royal Challengers Bangalore	Royal Challengers Bangalore	Capped	100	Kings XI Punjab^{[REC]}	100
7	SP1	Muttiah Muralitharan	Sri Lanka	61	Chennai Super Kings / Kochi Tuskers Kerala / Royal Challengers Bangalore	Royal Challengers Bangalore	Capped	100	Royal Challengers Bangalore	100
7	SP1	Pragyan Ojha	India	79	Deccan Chargers / Mumbai Indians	Mumbai Indians	Capped	200	Mumbai Indians ^{[RTM]}	325
7	SP1	Rahul Sharma	India	42	Deccan Chargers / Pune Warriors India	Pune Warriors India	Capped	50	Delhi Daredevils	190
8	BA2	Nic Maddinson	Australia	0			Capped	50	Royal Challengers Bangalore	50
8	BA2	Saurabh Tiwary	India	63	Mumbai Indians / Royal Challengers Bangalore	Royal Challengers Bangalore	Capped	50	Delhi Daredevils	70
9	WK2	Brendan Taylor	Zimbabwe	0			Capped	30	Sunrisers Hyderabad	30
10	AL2	Corey Anderson	New Zealand	0			Capped	100	Mumbai Indians	450
10	AL2	Moises Henriques	Australia	15	Kolkata Knight Riders / Delhi Daredevils / Mumbai Indians/ Royal Challengers Bangalore	Royal Challengers Bangalore	Capped	100	Sunrisers Hyderabad	100
10	AL2	Glenn Maxwell	Australia	5	Delhi Daredevils / Mumbai Indians	Mumbai Indians	Capped	100	Kings XI Punjab	600
10	AL2	Abhishek Nayar	India	55	Mumbai Indians / Kings XI Punjab / Pune Warriors India	Pune Warriors India	Capped	30	Rajasthan Royals	100
10	AL2	Laxmi Ratan Shukla	India	42	Kolkata Knight Riders	Kolkata Knight Riders	Capped	50	Delhi Daredevils	150
10	AL2	Andre Russell	Jamaica	7	Delhi Daredevils	Delhi Daredevils	Capped	50	Kolkata Knight Riders^{[REC]}	60
11	FA2	Varun Aaron	India	12	Delhi Daredevils / Kolkata Knight Riders	Delhi Daredevils	Capped	150	Royal Challengers Bangalore	200
11	FA2	Parvinder Awana	India	26	Delhi Daredevils / Kings XI Punjab	Kings XI Punjab	Capped	50	Kings XI Punjab ^{[RTM]}	65
11	FA2	Lakshmipathy Balaji	India	64	Chennai Super Kings / Kolkata Knight Riders	Kolkata Knight Riders	Capped	50	Kings XI Punjab	180
11	FA2	Nathan Coulter-Nile	Australia	1	Mumbai Indians	Mumbai Indians	Capped	100	Delhi Daredevils	425
11	FA2	Ashish Nehra	India	54	Delhi Daredevils / Mumbai Indians / Pune Warriors India	Delhi Daredevils	Capped	200	Chennai Super Kings	200
11	FA2	Mohit Sharma	India	15	Chennai Super Kings	Chennai Super Kings	Capped	100	Chennai Super Kings	200
11	FA2	Jaydev Unadkat	India	24	Kolkata Knight Riders / Royal Challengers Bangalore	Royal Challengers Bangalore	Capped	100	Delhi Daredevils	280
12	SP2	Samuel Badree	Trinidad and Tobago	1	Rajasthan Royals	Rajasthan Royals	Capped	30	Chennai Super Kings	30
13	BA3	Chris Lynn	Australia	1	Deccan Chargers / Sunrisers Hyderabad	Sunrisers Hyderabad	Capped	50	Kolkata Knight Riders^{[REC]}	130
13	BA3	Yalaka Venugopal Rao	India	58	Deccan Chargers / Delhi Daredevils	Delhi Daredevils	Capped	30	Sunrisers Hyderabad	55
14	AL3	John Hastings	Australia	0	Kochi Tuskers Kerala	Kochi Tuskers Kerala	Capped	50	Chennai Super Kings^{[REC]}	50
14	AL3	James Neesham	New Zealand	0			Capped	30	Delhi Daredevils	100
15	FA3	Ben Cutting	Australia	0	Kings XI Punjab	Kings XI Punjab	Capped	50	Rajasthan Royals	80
15	FA3	Josh Hazlewood	Australia	0			Capped	50	Mumbai Indians	50
15	FA3	Ben Hilfenhaus	Australia	9	Chennai Super Kings	Chennai Super Kings	Capped	100	Chennai Super Kings	100
15	FA3	Jason Holder	Barbados	6	Chennai Super Kings	Chennai Super Kings	Capped	50	Sunrisers Hyderabad	75
15	FA3	Kane Richardson	Australia	3	Pune Warriors India	Pune Warriors India	Capped	100	Rajasthan Royals	100
15	FA3	Tim Southee	New Zealand	5	Chennai Super Kings	Chennai Super Kings	Capped	50	Rajasthan Royals	120
19	FA4	Patrick Cummins	Australia	0			Capped	100	Kolkata Knight Riders^{[REC]}	100
19	FA4	Wayne Parnell	South Africa	18	Delhi Daredevils / Pune Warriors India	Pune Warriors India	Capped	100	Delhi Daredevils^{[REC]}	100
22	FA5	Marchant de Lange	South Africa	3	Kolkata Knight Riders	Kolkata Knight Riders	Capped	30	Mumbai Indians^{[REC]}	30
22	FA5	Krishmar Santokie	Jamaica	0			Capped	30	Mumbai Indians^{[REC]}	30
23	FA6	Matt Henry^{[LAT]}	New Zealand	0			Capped	30	Chennai Super Kings	30
25	UBA1	Mayank Agarwal	India	29	Royal Challengers Bangalore	Royal Challengers Bangalore	Uncapped	10	Delhi Daredevils	160
25	UBA1	Srikkanth Anirudha	India	19	Chennai Super Kings	Chennai Super Kings	Uncapped	20	Sunrisers Hyderabad	20
25	UBA1	Baba Aparajith	India				Uncapped	10	Chennai Super Kings	10
25	UBA1	Unmukt Chand	India	13	Delhi Daredevils	Delhi Daredevils	Uncapped	30	Rajasthan Royals	65
25	UBA1	Kedar Jadhav	India	23	Delhi Daredevils / Kochi Tuskers Kerala	Delhi Daredevils	Uncapped	30	Delhi Daredevils^{[RTM]}	200
25	UBA1	Manprit Juneja	India	7	Delhi Daredevils	Delhi Daredevils	Uncapped	10	Sunrisers Hyderabad	10
25	UBA1	Gurkeerat Singh	India	16	Kings XI Punjab	Kings XI Punjab	Uncapped	20	Kings XI Punjab	130
25	UBA1	Manish Pandey	India	48	Mumbai Indians / Royal Challengers Bangalore / Pune Warriors India	Pune Warriors India	Uncapped	20	Kolkata Knight Riders	170
25	UBA1	KL Rahul	India	5	Royal Challengers Bangalore	Royal Challengers Bangalore	Uncapped	10	Sunrisers Hyderabad	100
25	UBA1	Suryakumar Yadav	India	1	Mumbai Indians	Mumbai Indians	Uncapped	20	Kolkata Knight Riders	70
25	UBA1	Vijay Zol	India				Uncapped	30	Royal Challengers Bangalore	30
26	UWK1	Ankush Bains	India				Uncapped	10	Rajasthan Royals	10
26	UWK1	Manvinder Bisla	India	36	Deccan Chargers / Kings XI Punjab / Kolkata Knight Riders	Kolkata Knight Riders	Uncapped	30	Kolkata Knight Riders	60
26	UWK1	Debabrata Das	India	31	Kolkata Knight Riders	Kolkata Knight Riders	Uncapped	20	Kolkata Knight Riders^{[REC]}	20
26	UWK1	Ben Dunk	Australia				Uncapped	20	Mumbai Indians^{[REC]}	20
26	UWK1	CM Gautam	India	3	Delhi Daredevils / Royal Challengers Bangalore	Delhi Daredevils	Uncapped	20	Mumbai Indians	20
26	UWK1	Sushant Marathe	India				Uncapped	10	Mumbai Indians	10
26	UWK1	Yogesh Takawale	India	11	Mumbai Indians	Mumbai Indians	Uncapped	10	Royal Challengers Bangalore^{[REC]}	10
26	UWK1	Aditya Tare	India	12	Mumbai Indians	Mumbai Indians	Uncapped	20	Mumbai Indians	160
27	UAL1	Iqbal Abdullah	India	33	Kolkata Knight Riders	Kolkata Knight Riders	Uncapped	30	Rajasthan Royals	65
27	UAL1	Rajat Bhatia	India	68	Delhi Daredevils / Kolkata Knight Riders	Kolkata Knight Riders	Uncapped	30	Rajasthan Royals	170
27	UAL1	Kevon Cooper	Trinidad and Tobago	20	Rajasthan Royals	Rajasthan Royals	Uncapped	30	Rajasthan Royals	30
27	UAL1	Rishi Dhawan	India	6	Kings XI Punjab / Mumbai Indians	Mumbai Indians	Uncapped	20	Kings XI Punjab	300
27	UAL1	Mithun Manhas	India	43	Delhi Daredevils / Pune Warriors India	Pune Warriors India	Uncapped	30	Chennai Super Kings	30
27	UAL1	Parvez Rasool	India	2	Pune Warriors India	Pune Warriors India	Uncapped	20	Sunrisers Hyderabad	95
27	UAL1	Mandeep Singh	India	41	Kolkata Knight Riders / Kings XI Punjab	Kings XI Punjab	Uncapped	30	Kings XI Punjab	80
27	UAL1	Ryan Ten Doeschate	Netherlands	13	Kolkata Knight Riders	Kolkata Knight Riders	Uncapped	100	Kolkata Knight Riders	100
28	UFA1	Abu Nechim Ahmed	India	10	Mumbai Indians	Mumbai Indians	Uncapped	30	Royal Challengers Bangalore	30
28	UFA1	Jasprit Bumrah	India	2	Mumbai Indians	Mumbai Indians	Uncapped	20	Mumbai Indians	120
28	UFA1	Siddarth Kaul	India	6	Delhi Daredevils / Kolkata Knight Riders	Kolkata Knight Riders	Uncapped	20	Delhi Daredevils	45
28	UFA1	Dhawal Kulkarni	India	33	Mumbai Indians	Mumbai Indians	Uncapped	30	Rajasthan Royals	110
28	UFA1	Ishwar Pandey	India	2	Pune Warriors India	Pune Warriors India	Uncapped	10	Chennai Super Kings	150
28	UFA1	Prasanth Parameswaran	India	8	Kochi Tuskers Kerala / Royal Challengers Bangalore	Royal Challengers Bangalore	Uncapped	30	Sunrisers Hyderabad	30
28	UFA1	Sandeep Sharma	India	4	Kings XI Punjab	Kings XI Punjab	Uncapped	30	Kings XI Punjab	85
28	UFA1	Rahul Shukla	India	4	Mumbai Indians / Rajasthan Royals	Rajasthan Royals	Uncapped	20	Delhi Daredevils	40
28	UFA1	Anureet Singh	India	3	Kolkata Knight Riders	Kolkata Knight Riders	Uncapped	20	Kings XI Punjab	20
29	USP1	Shreyas Gopal	India				Uncapped	10	Mumbai Indians	10
29	USP1	Shadab Jakati	India	50	Chennai Super Kings	Chennai Super Kings	Uncapped	20	Royal Challengers Bangalore	20
29	USP1	Shahbaz Nadeem	India	29	Delhi Daredevils	Delhi Daredevils	Uncapped	30	Delhi Daredevils^{[RTM]}	85
29	USP1	Pawan Negi	India	9	Delhi Daredevils	Delhi Daredevils	Uncapped	10	Chennai Super Kings	10
29	USP1	Karn Sharma	India	14	Royal Challengers Bangalore / Sunrisers Hyderabad	Sunrisers Hyderabad	Uncapped	30	Sunrisers Hyderabad	375
29	USP1	Yuzvendra Chahal	India	1	Mumbai Indians	Mumbai Indians	Uncapped	10	Royal Challengers Bangalore	10
29	USP1	Kuldeep Yadav	India		Mumbai Indians		Uncapped	10	Kolkata Knight Riders	40
29	USP1	Pravin Tambe	India	3	Rajasthan Royals	Rajasthan Royals	Uncapped	10	Rajasthan Royals^{[RTM]}	10
30	UBA2	Karun Nair	India	2	Royal Challengers Bangalore	Royal Challengers Bangalore	Uncapped	10	Rajasthan Royals	75
30	UBA2	Apoorv Vijay Wankhade	India				Uncapped	10	Mumbai Indians^{[REC]}	10
31	UWK2	Amit Paunikar	India	5	Rajasthan Royals	Rajasthan Royals	Uncapped	20	Sunrisers Hyderabad	20
31	UWK2	Dishant Yagnik	India	24	Rajasthan Royals	Rajasthan Royals	Uncapped	30	Rajasthan Royals	30
32	UAL2	Akshar Patel	India		Mumbai Indians	Mumbai Indians	Uncapped	20	Kings XI Punjab	75
32	UAL2	Jalaj Saxena	India				Uncapped	20	Mumbai Indians	90
32	UAL2	Vijay Shankar	India				Uncapped	10	Chennai Super Kings	10
33	UFA2	Beuran Hendricks	South Africa				Uncapped	30	Kings XI Punjab	180
33	UFA2	Vikramjeet Malik	India	12	Kings XI Punjab / Rajasthan Royals	Rajasthan Royals	Uncapped	20	Rajasthan Royals	20
33	UFA2	Ronit More	India				Uncapped	10	Chennai Super Kings	10
33	UFA2	Harshal Patel	India	12	Mumbai Indians / Royal Challengers Bangalore	Royal Challengers Bangalore	Uncapped	30	Royal Challengers Bangalore^{[RTM]}	40
33	UFA2	Veer Pratap Singh	India	9	Deccan Chargers / Sunrisers Hyderabad	Sunrisers Hyderabad	Uncapped	20	Kolkata Knight Riders	40
33	UFA2	Ashish Reddy	India	21	Deccan Chargers / Sunrisers Hyderabad	Sunrisers Hyderabad	Uncapped	20	Sunrisers Hyderabad^{[REC]}	20
33	UFA2	Pawan Suyal	India	1	Mumbai Indians	Mumbai Indians	Uncapped	10	Mumbai Indians	10
33	UFA2	Sandeep Warrier	India				Uncapped	10	Royal Challengers Bangalore	10
34	USP2	Ankit Nagendra Sharma	India	10	Deccan Chargers / Sunrisers Hyderabad	Sunrisers Hyderabad	Uncapped	10	Rajasthan Royals^{[REC]}	10
35	UBA3	Ricky Bhui	India				Uncapped	10	Sunrisers Hyderabad^{[REC]}	10
37	UAL3	Rahul Tewatia	India				Uncapped	10	Rajasthan Royals^{[REC]}	10
37	UAL3	Jayant Yadav	India				Uncapped	10	Delhi Daredevils^{[REC]}	10
38	UFA3	Amit Mishra	India				Uncapped	10	Rajasthan Royals^{[REC]}	10
38	UFA3	Sachin Rana	India	2	Kolkata Knight Riders / Pune Warriors India / Sunrisers Hyderabad	Sunrisers Hyderabad	Uncapped	20	Royal Challengers Bangalore^{[REC]}	20
38	UFA3	HS Sharath^{[LAT]}	India				Uncapped	10	Delhi Daredevils^{[REC]}	10
39	USP3	Shivam Sharma^{[LAT]}	India				Uncapped	10	Kings XI Punjab^{[REC]}	10
42	UFA4	Deepak Hooda^{[LAT]}	India				Uncapped	10	Rajasthan Royals^{[REC]}	40
42	UFA4	Chama Milind	India				Uncapped	10	Sunrisers Hyderabad^{[REC]}	10
42	UFA4	Shardul Thakur	India				Uncapped	10	Kings XI Punjab^{[REC]}	20
44	UBA5	Tanmay Mishra	India	1	Deccan Chargers		Uncapped	10	Royal Challengers Bangalore^{[REC]}	10
45	UAL5	Sayan Sekhar Mondal	India				Uncapped	10	Kolkata Knight Riders^{[REC]}	10
45	UAL5	Karanveer Singh	India				Uncapped	10	Kings XI Punjab^{[REC]}	10
53	UBA9	Milind Kumar	India				Uncapped	10	Delhi Daredevils^{[REC]}	10

Source:Pepsi IPL 2014 Player Auction

Key to sets

- BA: Batsman
- FA: Fast bowler
- SP: Spin bowler
- AL: All-rounder
- M: Marquee player
- U: Uncapped player

^{LAT} LAT: Players who were not in the initial player lists but were added directly in the final auction list.
^{RTM} RTM: Players bought using Rights to Match Card.
^{REC} REC: Players unsold originally in their sets but brought back and bought from Recalled List.

== Withdrawn players ==
The following players withdrew from the tournament either due to injuries or because of other reasons.

Player	Team	Reason
Dwayne Bravo	Chennai Super Kings	Shoulder Injury
Nic Maddinson	Royal Challengers Bangalore	Injury
Nathan Coulter-Nile	Delhi Daredevils	Hamstring Injury
Jalaj Saxena	Mumbai Indians	Finger Injury
Saurabh Tiwary	Delhi Daredevils	Shoulder Injury
Rahul Sharma	Delhi Daredevils	Shoulder Injury
Zaheer Khan	Mumbai Indians	Side Strain

=== Replacement signings ===
Players were signed as replacement of contracted players who were not available to play due to injuries and national commitments. Under IPL rules, the replacements have to be chosen from the pool of players who went unsold in the auction, and cannot be paid more than the players they are replacing, though they can be paid less.

Player	Replaced	Team	Reason for replacement
Rilee Rossouw	Nic Maddinson	Royal Challengers Bangalore	Injury
Lendl Simmons	Jalaj Saxena	Mumbai Indians	Finger injury
Imran Tahir	Nathan Coulter-Nile	Delhi Daredevils	Hamstring injury
Praveen Kumar	Zaheer Khan	Mumbai Indians	Side strain
David Hussey	Dwayne Bravo	Chennai Super Kings	Shoulder injury
