= Sagar (name) =

In Sanskrit, sāgara means "sea". In India, Nepal and Bangladesh, Sagar is a very common given name and surname.

== Origins ==
=== Anglo-Saxon ===
Sagar is a patronymic Old English name. (Spelling variations include Sager, Seegar, Seager, Sigar, Segar, Seger, Saker, Sakar, and many more.) Most, if not all, people of the Anglo-Saxon period of England with this surname descend from a man (or number of men) known as Sagar. The name most likely derives from the diphthongal Old English word Sægar "sea-spear." Presumably it denotes a maritime warrior of the type who either commenced invasions of Britain in the fifth century or were invited as mercenaries in the political and military vacuum created with the final departure of Roman troops.

In Anglo-Saxon England, the name was found in several regions, predominantly in the northern areas of England (Yorkshire and Lancashire), which were part of the Angle Kingdom of Northumbria. (Originally from Angeln in Schleswig-Holstein, the Angles were the dominant Germanic tribe in the Anglo-Saxon settlement of Britain and gave their name to the English. They largely settled in the areas known as East Anglia, Mercia, and Northumbria in the fifth century. A list of their kings has been preserved in the Anglo-Saxon Chronicle and other sources.)

The Domesday Book records a man named Sagar as a Saxon landowner in Devon in 1086. It also records a man called Segarus, a Latinised version of the name, holding land in Essex at around the same time. By far the largest concentration of men with the surname Sagar, however, is found within a 50 km radius in the Lancashire/Yorkshire border area. Old church birth records show relatively moderate numbers of persons with the surname Sagar being born in towns such as Bradford, Halifax, and Askrigg in West Yorkshire.

From the 17th century onwards, records show persons with the surname Sagar or similar migrating from Britain or Europe to various parts of the world including North America, Australia, New Zealand, South Africa, Kenya, and Rhodesia (Zimbabwe).

=== India ===
Sagar in Hindi, Gujarati, Bengali and Marathi means ocean. Sagar is a very common first name in India for boys and also a surname (last name) among various Hindu communities.

=== Nepal ===
Sagar is very common name across Nepal and generally refers to either ocean or sky. Many locations and areas have been named after this. Prominent examples are 'Sagarmāthā' (Nepali: सगरमाथा) - the Nepali name for Mount Everest (the world's highest peak) and Sagarmāthā Zone (Nepali: सगरमाथा अञ्चल, "Sagarmāthā Anchal"), which includes mountain districts of the Himalayas.

=== Persian ===
The name ساغر (saaGar) meaning cup, goblet, wine (as used in poetry in Urdu), bowl is used by Persian and Urdu speaking people in Iran, Afghanistan, and Pakistan.

== List of people ==
Notable people with the name include:

=== Surname ===
- Amrit Sagar (born 1975), Indian film director
- Anjalika Sagar (born 1968), British filmmaker and curator
- Anthony Sagar (1920–1973), English actor
- Arun Sagar (born 1965), Indian film actor, art director, and comedian
- Chameli Bai Sagar (elected 1957), Indian politician
- Charlie Sagar (1878–1919), English footballer
- Faridur Reza Sagar (born 1955), Bangladeshi writer and film producer
- Geet Sagar (born 1984), Indian X-factor winner
- Ian Sagar (born 1982), British wheelchair basketball player
- John Warburton Sagar (1878–1941), English rugby union player and diplomat
- Kamal Sagar (born 1969), Indian architect, designer, and real estate developer
- Kripa Sagar (1875–1939), Punjabi poet
- Mamta Sagar, Indian writer
- Mohammed Sagar (born 1976), Iraqi refugee
- Nethi Vidya Sagar (elected 2007), Indian politician
- Nick Sagar - British Guyanese-Jamaican Actor
- Nishanth Sagar (born 1980), Indian actor
- Paul Sagar, British political theorist
- Pearl Sagar (born 1958), Northern Irish politician
- Preeti Sagar, Bollywood playback singer
- Pushpa Ratna Sagar (1922–2011), Nepalese lexicographer
- Ramanand Sagar (1917–2005), Indian film director
- Sean Sagar (born 1990), British Guyanese-Jamaican actor
- Shalini Kapoor Sagar (born 1976), Indian actress
- Siddharth Sagar (born 1993), Indian stand-up comedian and television act
- Vivek Sagar, Indian music composer
- Ted Sagar (1910–1986), English footballer
- Yasho Sagar (died 2012), Indian actor
- Yogesh Sagar, Indian politician

=== Given name ===
- Sagar Ballary (born 1975), Indian film director
- Sagar Mangalorkar (born 1990), Indian cricketer
- Sagar Mishra (born 1993), Indian cricketer
- Sagar (actor) (born 1983), Indian actor, full name Sagar Mulukuntla
- Sagar Mitchell (1866–1952), English pioneer of cinematography
- Sagar Pun (born 1993), Nepalese cricketer
- Sagar Sen (1932–1983), Bengali singer
- Sagar Shah (born 1990), Indian chess player
- Sagar Suppiah Retnam (1967–1995), Singaporean convicted murderer and former gang leader of Ang Soon Tong
- Sagar Thapa (born 1984), Nepalese footballer
- Sagar Trivedi (born 1991), Indian cricketer

=== Mononym ===
- Sagar (singer), Indian playback singer, lyricist and dialogue writer
