= List of Pune Warriors India cricketers =

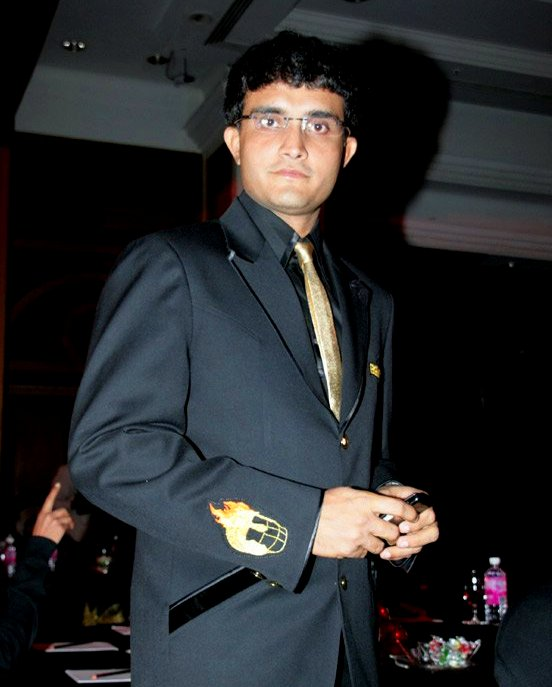
Sourav Ganguly had captained Pune Warriors India in the highest number of matches: 15.

Pune Warriors India (PWI) was a Pune-based franchise cricket team that participated in the Indian Premier League (IPL). They played their first Twenty20 match in the 2011 season of the IPL against Kings XI Punjab. PWI played in three editions of the IPL, failing to reach the playoffs on all occasions. They came last in the 2012 IPL, and came second-last in the 2011 and the 2013 IPL. After the 2013 season, PWI owners withdrew from the IPL due to financial differences with the Board of Control for Cricket in India. In total, 46 players had played for PWI, of whom Robin Uthappa had played the most matches (46, since his debut for the franchise in 2011).

The leading run-scorer for PWI was Uthappa, who had scored 1,103 runs. Jesse Ryder scored 86 runs against Delhi Daredevils in 2012, which was the highest individual score in an innings by a PWI batsman. Steve Smith had the team's best batting average: 40.07. (Note: This does not include players like Ashish Nehra and Raiphi Gomez, who has been not out in the innings they have played, due to which their batting average cannot be calculated.) Among PWI's bowlers, Rahul Sharma had taken more wickets than any other, claiming 34. The best bowling average among bowlers who had bowled more than 20 overs was Yuvraj Singh's 22.93. Ashok Dinda had the best bowling figures in an innings; he claimed four wickets against Mumbai Indians in a 2012 match, conceding 18 runs. Uthappa had taken the most catches as wicket-keeper for PWI, with 24, and had also made the most stumpings: six. Smith and Manish Pandey had claimed the highest number of catches among fielders, taking 14 each.

The list includes all players who have played in at least one match for PWI and is initially listed alphabetically by their last name. Many players have also represented other teams of the IPL, but only the records of their games for PWI are given.

== Key ==
General

- † – Captain
- ‡ – Wicket-keeper
- First – Year of Twenty20 debut for PWI
- Last – Year of last Twenty20 match for PWI
- Mat – Number of matches played

Fielding

- Ca – Catches taken
- St – Stumpings effected

Batting

- Inn – Number of innings batted
- NO – Number of innings not out
- Runs – Runs scored in career
- HS – Highest score
- 50 – Half-centuries scored
- Avg – Runs scored per dismissal
- * – Batsman remained not out

Bowling

- Balls – Balls bowled in career (Note: This doesn't include illegal deliveries like no-balls and wides.)
- Wkt – Wickets taken in career
- BBI – Best bowling in an innings (Note: The BBI has not been provided for those bowlers who have not taken any wicket while playing for PWI.)
- Ave – Average runs per wicket

== Players ==
- To sort the table by any statistic, click on the icon in the column title.

PWI cricketers
General					Batting						Bowling				Fielding	
Name (Note: The form and spelling of the names in the name column is according to English Wikipedia's naming conventions. Alternative spellings and name forms, where they exist, are given at the articles linked from this column.)	First	Last	Nationality (Note: The information in the nationality column may not necessarily reflect the player's birthplace or citizenship.)	Mat	Inn	NO	Runs	HS	50	Avg	Balls	Wkt	BBI	Ave	Ca	St
Udit Birla	2013	2013	India	2	1	0	7	7	0	7.00	0	–	–	–	1	0
Michael Clarke	2011	2013	Australia	6	6	0	98	41	0	16.33	66	2	1/12	33.50	1	0
Ashok Dinda	2012	2013	India	20	6	3	11	6*	0	3.66	438	25	4/18	25.36	4	0
James Faulkner	2011	2011	Australia	1	0	0	–	–	0	–	12	1	1/9	9.00	0	0
Callum Ferguson	2011	2012	Australia	9	8	2	98	23	0	16.33	0	–	–	–	2	0
Aaron Finch †	2013	2013	Australia	14	14	0	456	67	4	32.57	24	1	1/11	49.00	2	0
Sourav Ganguly †	2011	2012	India	19	18	1	318	45	0	18.70	60	2	2/27	47.50	7	0
Raiphi Gomez	2013	2013	India	2	1	1	4	4*	0	–	6	0	–	–	2	0
Abhishek Jhunjhunwala	2011	2011	India	3	2	0	10	10	0	5.00	12	0	–	–	2	0
Kamran Khan	2011	2011	India	1	0	0	–	–	0	–	18	0	–	–	0	0
Murali Kartik	2011	2012	India	17	7	6	38	14*	0	38.00	342	5	2/14	86.40	5	0
Bhuvneshwar Kumar	2011	2013	India	31	19	9	93	24*	0	9.30	642	24	3/18	29.45	4	0
Nathan McCullum	2011	2011	New Zealand	2	2	1	26	15	0	26.00	30	0	–	–	1	0
Anustup Majumdar	2012	2012	India	4	4	0	87	31	0	21.75	0	–	–	–	0	0
Mithun Manhas	2011	2013	India	23	19	5	247	42*	0	17.64	42	0	–	–	9	0
Mitchell Marsh	2011	2013	Australia	14	11	2	190	38	0	21.11	201	14	4/25	20.07	7	0
Angelo Mathews †	2012	2013	Sri Lanka	20	18	4	299	40	0	21.35	342	12	3/14	36.00	8	0
Ajantha Mendis	2013	2013	Sri Lanka	3	1	0	2	2	0	2.00	72	2	1/15	39.00	0	0
Mohnish Mishra	2011	2012	India	7	6	1	71	37*	0	14.20	0	–	–	–	0	0
Shrikant Mundhe	2011	2011	India	1	0	0	–	–	0	–	6	1	1/6	6.00	0	0
Ali Murtaza	2012	2013	India	4	2	1	8	5	0	8.00	72	3	3/15	35.00	1	0
Abhishek Nayar	2013	2013	India	11	9	3	66	25*	0	11.00	48	2	1/15	29.50	1	0
Ashish Nehra	2012	2012	India	13	2	2	11	9*	0	–	288	11	3/23	36.54	1	0
Tim Paine ‡	2011	2011	Australia	2	2	0	10	8	0	5.00	0	–	–	–	0	0
Ishwar Pandey	2013	2013	India	2	1	0	0	0	0	0.00	24	1	1/17	50.00	0	0
Manish Pandey	2011	2013	India	27	25	3	525	80*	3	23.86	0	–	–	–	14	0
Wayne Parnell	2011	2013	South Africa	18	11	3	61	16	0	7.62	391	20	3/27	23.90	3	0
Parvez Rasool	2013	2013	India	2	2	1	5	4*	0	5.00	30	1	1/23	28.00	0	0
Sachin Rana	2011	2011	India	2	1	1	18	18	0	18.00	4	0	–	–	0	0
Mahesh Rawat ‡	2013	2013	India	2	2	1	5	5	0	5.00	0	–	–	–	1	1
Kane Richardson	2013	2013	Australia	3	2	0	34	26	0	17.00	71	2	1/28	50.50	0	0
Jesse Ryder	2011	2012	New Zealand	24	24	1	548	86	4	23.82	134	1	1/8	37.60	8	0
Marlon Samuels	2012	2013	West Indies	10	10	1	132	46	0	14.66	196	9	3/39	27.77	1	0
Rahul Sharma	2011	2013	India	36	16	5	37	13	0	3.36	768	34	3/13	25.11	11	0
Harpreet Singh	2011	2012	India	3	3	1	20	13	0	10.00	0	–	–	–	2	0
Yuvraj Singh †	2011	2013	India	27	26	4	581	66*	2	26.40	306	15	4/29	22.93	6	0
Graeme Smith	2011	2011	South Africa	4	4	0	42	24	0	10.50	0	–	–	–	1	0
Steve Smith †	2012	2013	Australia	22	21	8	521	47*	0	40.07	2	0	–	–	14	0
Tirumalasetti Suman	2013	2013	India	7	5	0	52	23	0	10.40	12	1	1/15	15.00	2	0
Jerome Taylor	2011	2011	West Indies	5	2	1	3	2	0	3.00	117	6	3/30	26.16	0	0
Ross Taylor †	2013	2013	New Zealand	5	5	0	63	19	0	12.16	0	–	–	–	2	0
Alfonso Thomas	2011	2012	South Africa	15	4	2	20	12	0	10.00	315	2	3/22	29.00	3	0
Krishnakant Upadhyay	2012	2013	India	3	2	2	12	11*	0	–	54	0	–	–	1	0
Robin Uthappa ‡	2011	2013	India	46	45	4	1103	75	0	26.90	0	–	–	–	25	6
Shrikant Wagh	2011	2011	India	7	2	0	2	2	0	1.00	96	4	3/16	30.25	1	0
Luke Wright	2012	2013	England	7	6	1	106	44	0	21.20	71	2	1/12	62.00	2	0

== See also ==
- Sahara India Pariwar
