= Shivraj =

Shivraj is a name. People with the name include:

- Shivraj Patil (1935–2025), Indian politician
- Shivraj Singh Chouhan (born 1959), Indian politician
- Shivraj Singh of Jodhpur (born 1975), Indian former polo player
- Shivraj (actor) (1920–2017), Indian actor
- Haanii Shivraj (1985–2015), Malaysian actress and model
- Shivraj Singh Lodhi (1943–2021), Indian politician
- Shri Shivraj Ashtak, an Indian Marathi-language historical drama film series created by Digpal Lanjekar
- Hanumappa Shivraj (born 1990), Indian cricketer
- Shivraj Waichal

== See also ==
- Shivraj kumar, other name for Shiva Rajkumar
- Shivraj Singh Chouhan Fourth ministry
