= Sumit Kalia =

Indian cricketer (1987–2018)

Personal information
- Born: 27 November 1987
- Died: 8 July 2018 (aged 30)
- Source: Cricinfo, 28 April 2021

Sumit Kalia (27 November 1987 – 8 July 2018) was an Indian cricketer. He played in two Twenty20 matches for Punjab in the 2006–07 Inter State Twenty-20 Tournament. He also played in the Indian Cricket League in 2008, and was registered for the players' auction for the 2014 Indian Premier League. He died by drowning in Govind Sagar Lake in Himachal Pradesh. He was 30 years old.

== See also ==
- List of Punjab cricketers (India)
