= Udit =

Udit is an Indian masculine given name that may refer to:

- Udit Narayan, Bollywood playback singer
- Udit Narayan (politician) (born 1960), Fijian politician of Indian descent
- Udit Narayan Singh (1770–1835), Indian monarch
- Udit Patel (born 1984), Indian cricketer
- Udit Raj, Indian politician
- Udit Birla (born 1989), Indian cricketer
- Kunwar Udit Swaraj, Bollywood playback singer
