= Emerald High School Ground =

Sports ground

Emerald Heights International School
- Location: Indore, MP
- Country: India
- Coordinates: 22°39′02″N 75°49′00″E
- Establishment: 2001
- Capacity: 500
- Owner: The Emerald Heights International School
- Operator: The Emerald Heights International School
- Tenants: Madhya Pradesh cricket team

Emerald Heights International School ground is located in Indore, Madhya Pradesh. The ground was founded in 2001. The ground has got pavilion and can accommodate 500 persons. It has basketball and volleyball courts and a two international level cricket ground along with one gymnasium hall. It also has facilities for swimming, table tennis, billiards, cards and tennis courts. It has one main clubhouse.

The school has two cricket grounds, deco turf courts for lawn tennis, six glass courts for squash, two football fields and hosted Subroto Cup matches. There are 25 tables for table tennis, swimming pool, 6 basketball courts of which 2 are indoor and 4 outdoor, 6 badminton courts and an automated Indoor Shooting range with 22 targets. There are four volleyball courts.

== Records ==
=== First-class ===
- Highest Team Total: 546 Haryana v Madhya Pradesh 2009/10
- Lowest Team Total: 96 Assam v Madhya Pradesh 2008/09
- Highest Individual Score: 312 Sunny Singh Haryana v Madhya Pradesh 2009/10
- Highest partnership: 244* Rahul Dewan & Ankit Rawat, Haryana v Madhya Pradesh 2009/10

=== List A ===
- Highest team total: 349/5 Baroda Vs Sikkim 2024
- Lowest team total: n/a
- Highest individual score: 150* Amit Paunikar Railways v Vidarbha 2012/13
- Highest partnership: 221 Naman Ojha & Hrishikesh Kanitkar, Madhya Pradesh v Vidarbha 2008/09

=== Twenty20 ===
- Highest team total: 349/5 Baroda v Sikkim 2024/25
- Lowest team total: 80 Delhi v Orrissa 2012/13
- Highest individual score: 125 Unmukt Chand Delhi v Guajarat 2012/13
- Highest partnership: 202* Manpreet Juneja & Abdulahad Malik Guajarat v Kerala 2012/13
