= Ashish Singh (cricketer) =

Indian cricketer (born 1994)

Personal information
- Born: 25 December 1994 (age 31); Uttar Pradesh, India
- Source: ESPNcricinfo, 11 October 2015

Ashish Singh (born 25 December 1994) is an Indian first-class cricketer who plays for Railways. He made his Twenty20 debut for Railways in the 2016–17 Inter State Twenty-20 Tournament on 29 January 2017.
