= John Ward (umpire) =

Australian cricket umpire (born 1962)

Personal information
- Full name: John David Ward
- Born: 27 April 1962 (age 64); Melbourne, Victoria, Australia
- Batting: Right-handed
- Bowling: Right-arm offbreak
- Role: Umpire

Umpiring information
- ODIs umpired: 7 (2014–2016)
- T20Is umpired: 8 (2013–2016)
- WODIs umpired: 11 (2007–2016)
- WT20Is umpired: 6 (2007–2017)
- Source: Cricinfo, 17 April 2020

John David Ward (born 27 April 1962) is an Australian cricket umpire. In April 2020, Ward announced his retirement from elite umpiring.

== Umpiring career ==
He made his international debut on 28 January 2013, in a Twenty20 match between Australia and Sri Lanka. He stood in his first ODI game in 2014. On 1 December 2015 during a Ranji Trophy game, a shot by Barinder Sran struck Ward on the head.

He stood in 87 First-class, 84 List A and 117 T20 matches.

== See also ==
- List of One Day International cricket umpires
- List of Twenty20 International cricket umpires
