= Prashant Awasthi (cricketer) =

Indian cricketer (born 1990)

Personal information
- Born: 26 June 1990 (age 36); Kanpur, Uttar Pradesh, India
- Source: Cricinfo, 11 October 2015

Prashant Awasthi (born 26 June 1990) is an Indian first-class cricketer who plays for Railways.
