= Rohan Bhosale =

Indian cricketer (born 1988)

Personal information
- Born: 30 September 1988 (age 38); Mumbai, India
- Source: Cricinfo, 1 November 2015

Rohan Bhosale (born 30 September 1988) is an Indian first-class cricketer who plays for Railways.
