= Jawaharlal Nehru Stadium (Ghaziabad) =

Cricket ground

- Nehru Stadium
- Interactive map of Jawaharlal Nehru Stadium
- Full name: Jawaharlal Nehru Stadium
- Former names: Nehru Stadium
- Location: Ghaziabad, Uttar Pradesh
- Coordinates: 28.65923°N 77.43954°E
- Owner: Ghaziabad Municipal Corporation
- Operator: Uttar Pradesh Football Association
- Capacity: 2,000

Construction
- Groundbreaking: 1990
- Opened: 1990

Tenant
- Ghaziabad FC (some games)

Website
- ESPNcricinfo

The Jawaharlal Nehru Stadium is a multi-purpose stadium in Ghaziabad, Uttar Pradesh. The ground is mainly used for matches of football, and other sports. The stadium hosted six first-class matches in 1992 when Uttar Pradesh cricket team played against railways cricket team. The stadium has hosted many non-first-class matches including a match between touring Nepal cricket team and Ghaziabad District Cricket Association in 2013.

The also hosted a Youth Test match between India national under-19 cricket team and England under-19 cricket team in 1993. Association football club Ghaziabad FC sometimes use the stadium. The stadium hosted all the matches of the 2023 Legends Cricket Trophy, a T20 tournament featuring many retired star cricketers.
