= Faiz Ahmed (Railways cricketer) =

Indian cricketer (born 1995)

Personal information
- Born: 28 March 1995 (age 31); Kanpur, India
- Batting: Left-handed
- Bowling: Right-arm offbreak

Domestic team information
- Years: Team
- 2015–16: Railways
- Source: ESPNcricinfo, 15 October 2017

Faiz Ahmed (born 28 March 1995) is an Indian cricketer who plays for Railways. He made his first-class debut in the 2015–16 Ranji Trophy on 15 October 2015.
