= Arindam Ghosh (cricketer) =

Indian cricketer (born 1986)

Personal information
- Full name: Arindam Nanigopal Ghosh
- Born: 19 October 1986 (age 40); Barasat, West Bengal, India
- Batting: Right-handed
- Bowling: Right-arm medium
- Role: Batsman

Domestic team information
- Years: Team
- 2006/07-2011/12: Bengal
- 2009: Kolkata Knight Riders
- 2013/14–present: Railways

Career statistics
| Competition | FC | LA | T20 |
|---|---|---|---|
| Matches | 24 | 14 | 13 |
| Runs scored | 1,380 | 218 | 170 |
| Batting average | 44.51 | 19.81 | 18.88 |
| 100s/50s | 3/6 | 0/0 | 0/1 |
| Top score | 208* | 38 | 67 |
| Catches/stumpings | 12/– | 9/– | 8/– |
- Source: ESPNcricinfo, 16 April 2015

Arindam Nanigopal Ghosh (born 19 October 1986) is an Indian cricketer who plays for Railways cricket team as a right-handed batsman. He was a member of the Kolkata Knight Riders squad in 2009 Indian Premier League.

Ghosh played for the India Under-19 cricket team during the 2005/06 season. From 2006/07 to 2011/12, he played for Bengal cricket team. He switched to Railways cricket team before the 2013/14 season. In October 2014, he played for Central Zone cricket team in the final of the 2014–15 Duleep Trophy.

He was the leading run-scorer for Railways in the 2017–18 Ranji Trophy, with 406 runs in six matches. He was also the leading run-scorer for Railways in the 2018–19 Vijay Hazare Trophy, with 246 runs in six matches.
