= V. Cheluvaraj =

Indian cricketer (born 1986)

Personal information
- Full name: Vairamudi Cheluvaraj
- Born: 5 September 1986 (age 40); Bangalore, India
- Source: Cricinfo, 1 November 2015

V. Cheluvaraj (born 5 September 1986) is an Indian first-class cricketer who plays for Railways. He made his Twenty20 debut on 3 January 2016 in the 2015–16 Syed Mushtaq Ali Trophy.
