= Deepak Bansal =

Indian cricketer (born 1990)

Personal information
- Born: 19 July 1990 (age 36); Ludhiana, India
- Source: ESPNcricinfo, 10 October 2015

Deepak Bansal (born 19 July 1990) is an Indian cricketer who plays for Punjab. He made his first-class debut for Punjab on 15 November 2015 in the 2015–16 Ranji Trophy. He made his Twenty20 debut for Railways in the 2016–17 Inter State Twenty-20 Tournament on 5 February 2017.
