= Prasanth Kumar =

Indian cricketer (born 1991)

Personal information
- Full name: Dara Bengimen Prasanth Kumar
- Born: 13 December 1991 (age 34); Anantapur, India
- Source: Cricinfo, 7 October 2015

Prasanth Kumar (born 13 December 1991) is an Indian cricketer who plays for Andhra Pradesh.
