= Sagar Mishra =

Indian cricketer (born 1993)

Personal information
- Born: 15 September 1993 (age 33); Mumbai, India
- Batting: Left-handed
- Bowling: Slow Left arm orthodox

Domestic team information
- Years: Team
- 2015–16: Railways
- Source: Cricinfo, 13 December 2015

Sagar Mishra (born 15 September 1993) is an Indian cricketer who plays for Railways. He made his first-class debut on 15 November 2015 in the 2015–16 Ranji Trophy.
