= Hitesh Solanki =

Indian cricketer (born 1991)

Personal information
- Born: 3 November 1991 (age 35); Vadodara, Gujarat, India
- Source: ESPNcricinfo, 10 October 2015

Hitesh Solanki (born 3 November 1991) is an Indian cricketer who plays for Baroda. He made his List A debut for Services in the 2016–17 Vijay Hazare Trophy on 4 March 2017. In October and November 2021, Solanki played for Burgher Recreation Club in the 2021–22 Major Clubs Limited Over Tournament in Sri Lanka.
