= Umang Sharma =

Indian cricketer (born 1989)

Personal information
- Born: 20 October 1989 (age 37); Meerut, Uttar Pradesh, India
- Batting: Right-handed

Domestic team information
- Years: Team
- 2012/13-2019/20: Uttar Pradesh
- Source: ESPNcricinfo, 10 October 2015

Umang Sharma (born 20 October 1989) is an Indian former first-class cricketer who played for Uttar Pradesh.
