= A. G. Pradeep =

Indian cricketer (born 1987)

Personal information
- Full name: Andimani Ganga Pradeep
- Born: 13 January 1987 (age 39); Vijayawada, India
- Batting: Right-handed
- Bowling: Right-arm off spin
- Role: Middle-order batsman

Domestic team information
- Years: Team
- 2004–2017: Andhra Pradesh
- Source: ESPNcricinfo, 7 October 2015

Andimani Ganga Pradeep (born 13 January 1987) is a retired Indian cricketer who played for Andhra Pradesh from 2004 to 2017. He was a right-handed middle-order batsman.

== Personal life ==
Pradeep was born on 13 January 1987 in Vijayawada. He comes from a family of cricketers, with his father A. G. Prasad, brother A. G. Praveen and uncle I. Sreenivas also playing first-class cricket for Andhra. Outside of cricket, he worked in Chennai for the Indian Overseas Bank.

== Career ==
Pradeep was captain of India's under-17 squad and represented the India national under-19 cricket team. He made his senior debut for Andhra in 2004 at the age of 17.

Pradeep played 64 Ranji Trophy matches for Andhra, scoring six centuries. He captained Andhra during the 2012–13 season. His last match for the state was in the 2016–17 Vijay Hazare Trophy. He announced his retirement from all forms of cricket in August 2020.
