= Bandaru Ayyappa =

Indian cricketer (born 1992)

Personal information
- Full name: Bandaru Satyanarayana Murty Ayyappa
- Born: 27 October 1992 (age 34); East Godavari, Andhra Pradesh, India
- Role: Bowler

Domestic team information
- Years: Team
- 2013/14–2022/23: Andhra Pradesh
- Source: ESPNcricinfo, 7 October 2015

Bandaru Satyanarayana Murty Ayyappa (born 27 October 1992) is an Indian former first-class cricketer who played for Andhra Pradesh. In July 2018, he was named in the squad for India Blue for the 2018–19 Duleep Trophy.

In December 2018, he was bought by the Delhi Capitals in the player auction for the 2019 Indian Premier League. He was released by the Delhi Capitals ahead of the 2020 IPL auction.
