= Vishal Dabholkar =

Indian cricketer (born 1987)

Personal information
- Full name: Vishal Vishwas Dabholkar
- Born: 23 March 1987 (age 39); Bombay, Maharashtra, India
- Batting: Right-handed
- Bowling: Slow left-arm orthodox
- Role: Bowler

Domestic team information
- Years: Team
- 2013–2017: Mumbai

Career statistics
Competition	FC	LA
Matches	29	1
Runs scored	111	1
Batting average	5.55	1.00
100s/50s	0/0	0/0
Top score	17	1
Balls bowled	5936	60
Wickets	97	1
Bowling average	30.72	52.00
5 wickets in innings	4	0
10 wickets in match	2	n/a
Best bowling	7/53	1/52
Catches/stumpings	13/–	1/–
- Source: Cricinfo, 19 October 2015

Vishal Vishwas Dabholkar (born 23 March 1987) is a cricketer who has played for Mumbai in Indian domestic cricket. He is a slow left-arm orthodox bowler.

Dabholkar made his first-class debut in the quarter-final of 2012–13 Ranji Trophy against Baroda. He picked up 3/88 in the first innings and 1/63 in the second innings. In November 2013, against Punjab, he had figures of 6/38 and 4/37. In October 2015 he helped Mumbai to a one-wicket victory over Tamil Nadu when he took 5/122 and 7/53 and, batting at number 11, hit the winning run.
