= Mohammad Saif (cricketer, born 1996) =

Indian cricketer (born 1996)

Personal information
- Born: 30 August 1996 (age 30); Varanasi, Uttar Pradesh, India
- Batting: Left-handed
- Bowling: Slow left-arm orthodox

Domestic team information
- Years: Team
- 2014/15–2020/21: Uttar Pradesh
- 2021/22–present: Railways
- Source: ESPNcricinfo

Mohammad Saif (born 30 August 1996) is an Indian cricketer who plays for Railways in domestic cricket. He is a left-handed batsman who played four Youth ODIs and one Youth Test for India Under-19 cricket team in 2013. He scored 86 on his first-class debut against Railways in February 2015.

Saif was named the best under-16 cricketer at the BCCI Awards in 2012. His father Khurshid Raza had played cricket at the club level. From the age of 13, Saif received training from Deepak Sharma who had previously coached international cricketers like Suresh Raina and R. P. Singh.

He made his List A debut for Uttar Pradesh in the 2017–18 Vijay Hazare Trophy on 5 February 2018. He made his Twenty20 debut on 9 November 2021, for Railways in the 2021–22 Syed Mushtaq Ali Trophy.
