= Chameli Bai Sagar =

Indian politician

- Constituency: Morena Vidhan Sabha

Chameli Bai Sagar was an Indian politician from the state of the Madhya Pradesh. She represented Morena Vidhan Sabha constituency in Madhya Pradesh Legislative Assembly by winning General election of 1957.
