= Rujul Bhatt =

Indian cricketer (born 1986)

Rujul Bhatt (born 24 April 1986) is an Indian cricketer. He is a left-handed batsman and right-arm off-break bowler who plays for Gujarat. He was born in Ahmedabad.

Bhatt made his cricketing debut for Gujarat Under-16s in the 2000-01 Vijay Merchant Trophy, playing two matches in that year's competition, and four matches in the competition the following season.

The following season, he played in the Cooch Behar Trophy for the Under-19s, and once again for the Under-17s in the Vijay Merchant Trophy.

Between 2003 and 2005, Bhatt played with the Under-19s, and between 2006 and 2008 with the Under-22s. He made his Twenty20 debut for Gujarat in the Inter-State Tournament of 2006–07, in which Gujarat finished in second position in the first-phase group stage and in fourth place in the second phase.

Bhatt played four matches in a tour of Australia by the Kolkata Knight Riders, whom he joined for 2008–09. He made his List A debut in the Vijay Hazare Trophy at the end of the 2008–09 season, playing four matches in the competition, scoring a half-century on his List A debut, his first of two in the competition.

Bhatt made his first-class debut for the side during the 2009–10 season, against Orissa. He scored a massive century and two half-centuries in that season.

In the off season he runs his Travel Company in the name of "Blue Escape"
