= Ketan Panchal =

Indian cricketer (born 1986)

Personal information
- Born: 4 October 1986 (age 40)
- Source: ESPNcricinfo, 18 October 2015

Ketan Panchal (born 4 October 1986) is an Indian first-class cricketer who plays for Baroda.
