= Ragupathy Silambarasan =

Indian cricketer (born 1993)

Personal information
- Born: 7 March 1993 (age 33)
- Batting: Right-handed
- Bowling: Right arm medium fast
- Role: Bowler

Domestic team information
- Years: Team
- 2020–21: Tamil Nadu
- Source: Cricinfo, 22 February 2021

Ragupathy Silambarasan (born 7 March 1993) is an Indian cricketer. He made his List A debut on 22 February 2021, for Tamil Nadu in the 2020–21 Vijay Hazare Trophy. He made his Twenty20 debut on 8 November 2021, for Tamil Nadu in the 2021–22 Syed Mushtaq Ali Trophy.
