= Teerthanker Mahaveer University Ground =

Multi-purpose stadium in Moradabad, India

Coordinates: 28.8247°N 78.6581°E

- TMU Ground
- Interactive map of Teerthanker Mahaveer University Ground
- Full name: Teerthanker Mahaveer University Ground
- Location: Moradabad, Uttar Pradesh
- Owner: Teerthanker Mahaveer University
- Operator: Teerthanker Mahaveer University
- Capacity: 10,000

Teerthanker Mahaveer University Ground is a multi-purpose stadium in Moradabad, Uttar Pradesh. The stadium has got facilities for various sports, including cricket, football, and hockey. There are also facilities for indoor sports such as basketball, badminton, gymnastics, handball, volleyball, lawn tennis, table tennis, weight lifting and kabaddi.

The ground is a made considering all norms of BCCI so that it can host Ranji Trophy matches. The stadium hosted its first cricket match in 2012 when the ground hosted a match of Cooch Behar Trophy between Uttar Pradesh Under-19s and Kerala Under-19s. The ground will hosts its first first-class match when Uttar Pradesh cricket team will play against Madhya Pradesh cricket team in 2015–16 Ranji Trophy.

== Ranji Trophy matches ==
#	Team 1	Team 2	Winner	Year
1	Uttar Pradesh	Madhya Pradesh	Drawn	2015
