= Vivek Singh (cricketer) =

Indian cricketer (born 1993)

Personal information
- Full name: Birendra Vivek Singh
- Born: 1 November 1993 (age 33); Howrah, West Bengal, India
- Batting: Left-handed
- Bowling: Right-arm medium
- Role: Wicket-keeper; Batsman

Domestic team information
- Years: Team
- 2013/14, 2014/15, present: Bengal
- 2015/16: Railways
- 2018–: Mohun Bagan
- Source: Cricinfo, 16 January 2021

Vivek Singh (born 1 November 1993) is an Indian cricketer who plays for Railways. He made his first-class debut on 15 November 2015 in the 2015–16 Ranji Trophy, playing for Railways. On 12 January 2021, in the 2020–21 Syed Mushtaq Ali Trophy, he scored his first century in a T20 match.
