= Amit Paunikar =

Indian cricketer (born 1988)

Personal information
- Full name: Amit Gajanan Paunikar
- Born: 18 April 1988 (age 38); Nagpur, Maharashtra.
- Batting: Right-handed
- Bowling: Right-arm medium
- Role: Wicketkeeper batsman

Domestic team information
- Years: Team
- Railways
- Vidarbha
- 2010–2011: Rajasthan Royals
- Source: ESPNcricinfo, 16 February 2014

Amit Paunikar (born 18 April 1988, Nagpur) is an Indian National cricketer. He is a right-handed batsman and occasional right-arm medium bowler.
