= Himanshu Asnora =

Indian cricketer (born 1995)

Personal information
- Born: 16 August 1995 (age 31); Lucknow, India
- Batting: Right-handed
- Bowling: Right arm medium

Domestic team information
- Years: Team
- 2015: Uttar Pradesh
- Source: ESPNcricinfo, 10 October 2015

Himanshu Asnora (born 16 August 1995) is an Indian cricketer who plays for Uttar Pradesh. Playing as a right-handed batsman, Asnora has participated in various domestic competitions, like the Ranji Trophy
