= Nikhil Patil =

Indian cricketer (born 1989)

Personal information
- Born: 27 November 1989 (age 36); Mumbai, India
- Source: ESPNcricinfo, 10 October 2015

Nikhil Patil (born 27 November 1989) is an Indian first-class cricketer who plays for Mumbai.
