= Saurabh Wakaskar =

Indian cricketer (born 1991)

Personal information
- Full name: Saurabh Pradeep Wakaskar
- Born: 8 September 1991 (age 35); Baroda, Gujarat, India
- Batting: Left-handed
- Bowling: Leg break
- Role: Batsman

Domestic team information
- Years: Team
- 2012–present: Baroda

Career statistics
Competition	FC	LA	T20
Matches	13	5	2
Runs scored	928	84	38
Batting average	42.18	16.80	19.00
100s/50s	3/5	0/0	0/0
Top score	128	32	23
Catches/stumpings	4/–	2/–	0/–
- Source: Cricinfo, 16 January 2014

Saurabh Pradeep Wakaskar (born 8 September 1991) is an Indian cricketer who plays for Baroda in domestic cricket. He is a left-hand opening batsman and leg break bowler.
