= Krishnakant Upadhyay =

Indian cricketer (born 1986)

K k Upadhyay
Personal information
- Full name: Krishnakant Upadhyay
- Born: 18 June 1986 (age 40); Agra, Uttar Pradesh, India
- Batting: Right-handed
- Bowling: Right-hand medium
- Role: Bowler

Domestic team information
- Years: Team
- 2012-13: Pune Warriors
- 2018/19–present: Railways

Career statistics
Competition	FC	LA	T20
Matches	34	21	35
Runs scored	501	37	14
Batting average	15.65	4.62	6.33
100s/50s	0/1	0/0	0/0
Top score	55	15	14*
Balls bowled	6,898	1,060	739
Wickets	104	29	32
Bowling average	29.81	25.00	29.46
5 wickets in innings	2	0	0
10 wickets in match	1	0	0
Best bowling	7/76	4/39	3/12
Catches/stumpings	8/–	3/–	7/–
- Source: ESPNcricinfo, 14 March 2018

KrishnaKant Upadhyay (born 18 June 1986) is a cricketer from Uttar Pradesh. Born in Agra, Uttar Pradesh, he plays for Pune Warriors India in the Indian Premier League and for Railways in Ranji Trophy. He is a medium pace bowler.
