= Rajwinder Singh (cricketer) =

Indian cricketer (born 1989)

Personal information
- Born: 7 May 1989 (age 37); Patiala, India
- Source: Cricinfo, 17 October 2015

Rajwinder Singh (born 7 May 1989) is an Indian first-class cricketer who plays for Punjab.
