= Mihir Hirwani =

Indian cricketer (born 1994)

Personal information
- Full name: Mihir Narendra Hirwani
- Born: 14 May 1994 (age 32); Bhopal, Madhya Pradesh, India
- Batting: Right-handed
- Bowling: Legbreak googly
- Role: Bowler
- Relatives: Narendra Hirwani (father)
- Source: ESPNcricinfo

Mihir Narendra Hirwani (born 14 May 1994) is an Indian first-class cricketer who plays for Madhya Pradesh. His father Narendra was a legspin bowler who played for India and is mainly remembered for his success on his Test debut.

He made his Twenty20 debut on 10 January 2016 in the 2015–16 Syed Mushtaq Ali Trophy. He made his List A debut for Madhya Pradesh in the 2017–18 Vijay Hazare Trophy on 5 February 2018.

He was the leading wicket-taker for Madhya Pradesh in the 2017–18 Ranji Trophy, with 31 dismissals in seven matches. In July 2018, he was named in the squad for India Red for the 2018–19 Duleep Trophy.
