= Aditya Shrivastava (cricketer) =

Indian cricketer (born 1993)

Personal information
- Full name: Aditya Rajesh Shrivastava
- Born: 18 September 1993 (age 33); Bhopal, Madhya Pradesh, India
- Batting: Right-handed
- Bowling: Legbreak googly
- Source: ESPNcricinfo, 10 October 2015

Aditya Shrivastava (born 18 September 1993) is an Indian cricketer who plays for Madhya Pradesh. He made his List A debut on 20 February 2021, for Madhya Pradesh in the 2020–21 Vijay Hazare Trophy.
