= Ashwin Hebbar =

Indian cricketer (born 1995)

Personal information
- Full name: Kattingeri Ashwin Hebbar
- Born: 15 November 1995 (age 30); Nellore, Andhra Pradesh, India
- Batting: Right-handed
- Bowling: Right-arm medium
- Role: Batting All-rounder

Domestic team information
- Years: Team
- 2020–present: Andhra Pradesh
- 2022–present: Delhi Capitals
- 2022–present: Vizag Warriors
- FC debut: 27 January 2020 Andhra Pradesh v Kerala
- LA debut: 20 February 2021 Andhra Pradesh v Vidarbha

Career statistics
Competition	FC	LA	T20
Matches	17	22	14
Runs scored	566	403	311
Batting average	20.96	36.63	38.87
100s/50s	1/2	0/4	0/2
Top score	159	60*	76*
Balls bowled	2222	608	85
Wickets	52	14	3
Bowling average	22.96	42.07	50.66
5 wickets in innings	2	0	0
10 wickets in match	0	0	0
Best bowling	5/53	3/23	2/17
Catches/stumpings	10/–	12/–	8/–
- Source: ESPNcricinfo, 7 August 2024

Ashwin Hebbar (born 15 November 1995) is an Indian first-class cricketer who plays for Andhra Pradesh. He was the leading run-scorer for Andhra in the 2018–19 Vijay Hazare Trophy, with 299 runs in eight matches. In February 2022, he was bought by the Delhi Capitals in the auction for the 2022 Indian Premier League tournament.

As vice captain of the Vizag Warriors, Hebbar was the standout player of the 2024 Andhra Premier League, scoring 456 runs with an average strike rate of 92 in 8 innings.
