= Bhargav Merai =

Indian cricketer (born 1992)

Personal information
- Full name: Bhargav Hemant Merai
- Born: 2 February 1992 (age 34); Surat, Gujarat, India
- Batting: Right-handed
- Bowling: Right-arm medium
- Source: ESPNcricinfo, 17 October 2015

Bhargav Merai (born 2 February 1992) is an Indian cricketer who plays for Gujarat. In October 2019, he was named in India A's squad for the 2019–20 Deodhar Trophy.
