= Himanshu Chawla =

Indian cricketer (born 1991)

Personal information
- Born: 31 May 1991 (age 35); Delhi, India
- Source: ESPNcricinfo, 10 October 2015

Himanshu Chawla (born 31 May 1991) is an Indian first-class cricketer who plays for Punjab.
