= Hanumappa Shivraj =

Indian cricketer (born 1990)

Personal information
- Born: 25 November 1990 (age 35); Anantapuram, Andhra Pradesh, India
- Source: ESPNcricinfo, 2 November 2015

Hanumappa Shivraj (born 25 November 1990) is an Indian cricketer who plays for Andhra Pradesh. He made his first-class debut on 30 October in the 2015–16 Ranji Trophy.
