= Pinal Shah =

Indian cricketer (born 1987)

Personal information
- Full name: Pinal Rohitbhai Shah
- Born: 3 November 1987 (age 39); Baroda, Gujarat, India
- Batting: Right-handed
- Role: Wicketkeeper Batter

Domestic team information
- Years: Team
- 2005–2018: Baroda
- 2008–2009: Mumbai Indians
- 2011: Rajasthan Royals

Career statistics
Competition	FC	LA	T20
Matches	93	51	54
Runs scored	3,409	1,070	461
Batting average	27.05	30.57	15.36
100s/50s	3/18	1/5	0/2
Top score	217*	157*	71
Catches/stumpings	278/38	47/18	44/15
- Source: ESPNcricinfo, 1 March 2025

Pinal Shah (born 3 November 1987, in Baroda) was the wicket-keeper for India U19s World Cup squad. He is an able batsman and has played five first-class matches for Baroda scoring 377 runs, including a blistering 217* against Services in early 2006. He usually bats in the middle-order, but has also opened on occasion.

Shah has played 11 U19 ODI matches for India but has been unable to reproduce the batting form that he showed in his short career with Baroda, his highest score being just 19. He has taken 23 ODI catches and is guaranteed a place in the starting eleven for the Under 19 World Cup as he is the squad's specialist wicket-keeper.
