= Sagar Mangalorkar =

Indian cricketer (born 1990)

Personal information
- Full name: Sagar Suresh Mangalorkar
- Born: 19 September 1990 (age 36); Mangalore, Karnataka, India
- Source: Cricinfo, 10 October 2015

Sagar Mangalorkar (born 19 September 1990) is an Indian cricketer who plays for Baroda. He is a right-handed batsman and a right-arm fast medium bowler.
