= Ankit Sharma (cricketer) =

Indian cricketer (born 1991)

Personal information
- Full name: Ankit Nagendra Sharma
- Born: 20 April 1991 (age 35); Gwalior, Madhya Pradesh, India
- Batting: Left-handed
- Bowling: Slow left-arm orthodox
- Role: Bowler

Domestic team information
- Years: Team
- 2009/10–2020/21: Madhya Pradesh
- 2012: Deccan Chargers (squad no. 2)
- 2013: Sunrisers Hyderabad (squad no. 5)
- 2014–2015: Rajasthan Royals (squad no. 18)
- 2016–2017: Rising Pune Supergiants (squad no. 12)
- 2018: Rajasthan Royals (squad no. 18)
- 2022/23-present: Puducherry
- Source: ESPNcricinfo, 16 December 2021

Ankit Nagendra Sharma (born 20 April 1991) is an Indian cricketer who plays for Kerala in domestic cricket. The player who previously played for Puducherry, is a left-handed batsman and a slow left-arm orthodox bowler.

For the 2025-26 Ranji Trophy season, Ankit has obtained an NoC from Puducherry to play for Kerala. He is part of the team's playing eleven for their season opener against Maharashtra.

In the 2015–16 season of Ranji Trophy, Ankit was the second-highest wicket-taker for Madhya Pradesh, picking up 33 wickets in 9 matches. Ankit also took his career-best bowling figures of 7 for 91 against Andhra Pradesh in that season, helping his team to quarter-final stage.

He scored his first century (104 runs) playing for Madhya Pradesh at Indore against Baroda during Ranji Trophy 2017-18 session.

In January 2018, he was bought by the Rajasthan Royals in the 2018 IPL auction.
