= Varun Khanna =

Indian cricketer (born 1984)

Personal information
- Born: 12 October 1984 (age 42)
- Source: Cricinfo, 10 October 2015

Varun Khanna (born 12 October 1984) is an Indian cricketer who plays for Punjab. He made his List A debut for Punjab in the 2016–17 Vijay Hazare Trophy on 6 March 2017.
