= Mayank Sidhana =

Indian cricketer (born 1986)

Personal information
- Full name: Mayank Sidhana
- Born: 4 December 1986 (age 39); Delhi, India
- Batting: Right-handed
- Bowling: Right-arm offbreak
- Role: Batsman

Domestic team information
- Years: Team
- 2008–present: Punjab

Career statistics
| Competition | FC | LA | T20 |
|---|---|---|---|
| Matches | 22 | 24 | 14 |
| Runs scored | 1333 | 541 | 206 |
| Batting average | 41.65 | 38.64 | 17.16 |
| 100s/50s | 2/8 | 1/2 | 0/0 |
| Top score | 122 | 100 | 35 |
| Balls bowled | 105 | – | – |
| Wickets | 1 | – | – |
| Bowling average | 58.00 | – | – |
| 5 wickets in innings | 0 | – | – |
| 10 wickets in match | 0 | – | – |
| Best bowling | 1/1 | – | – |
| Catches/stumpings | 8/– | 7/– | 5/– |
- Source: ESPNcricinfo, 26 December 2013

Mayank Sidhana (born 4 December 1986) is an Indian cricketer. He plays for Punjab in the Indian domestic cricket. He is a right-hand batsman and part-time offbreak bowler.
