= Sarabjit Ladda =

Indian cricketer (born 1986)

Personal information
- Full name: Sarabjit Ladda
- Born: 10 July 1986 (age 40); Patiala, Punjab, India
- Batting: Right-handed
- Bowling: Right arm leg break
- Role: Bowler

Domestic team information
- Years: Team
- 2010–present: Punjab
- 2010: Delhi Daredevils
- 2011–2015: Kolkata Knight Riders
- 2016–2017: Gujarat Lions
- 2023-present: MI New York

Career statistics
Competition	FC	LA	T20
Matches	38	18	11
Runs scored	2686	446	107
Batting average	51.65	31.85	13.37
100s/50s	6/15	0/4	0/0
Top score	176	74	30*
Balls bowled	270	41	60
Wickets	2	1	5
Bowling average	101.5	51.00	14.80
5 wickets in innings	0	0	0
10 wickets in match	0	0	0
Best bowling	1/8	1/46	2/19
Catches/stumpings	16/–	7/–	4/-
- Source: ESPNcricinfo, 27 May 2012

Sarabjit Ladda (born 10 July 1986) is an Indian cricketer who plays for Punjab in domestic cricket. He is a right-handed batsman and a legbreak bowler. He is a former member of the Gujarat Lions squad in the Indian Premier League. He married Nidhi Pandey on 25 January 2016 in Patiala.He has participated in the Major Cricket League in USA in 2023.
