= Manpreet Juneja =

Indian cricketer

Personal information
- Full name: Manpreet Charanjit Juneja
- Born: 12 September 1990 (age 36); Ahmedabad, Gujarat, India
- Batting: Right-handed
- Bowling: Right-arm off break
- Role: Middle-order batsman

Domestic team information
- Years: Team
- 2008/09–2021/22: Gujarat
- 2013: Delhi Daredevils

Career statistics
Competition	FC	LA	T20
Matches	69	53	44
Runs scored	4,265	1,397	952
Batting average	45.37	33.26	28.84
100s/50s	9/25	1/10	1/4
Top score	201*	114*	108*
Catches/stumpings	47/–	23/–	22/–
- Source: ESPNcricinfo, 26 December 2023

Manpreet Juneja (born 12 September 1990) is an Indian former cricketer who played for Gujarat in domestic cricket. He was a right-handed middle-order batsman. Juneja scored an unbeaten 201 on his first-class debut against Tamil Nadu in December 2011, becoming only the fourth Indian to score a double-century on first-class debut. T. A. Sekhar, the mentor of IPL franchise Delhi Daredevils, was said to have been tracking Juneja even before his debut and drafted him into the Daredevils squad in January 2012.

Juneja scored 796 runs from 8 matches at an average of 66.33 in the 2012–13 Ranji Trophy. He had three centuries and three fifties to his name in the season.

In 2013, he along with Abdulahad Malek set the highest ever 4th wicket partnership in any form of T20 cricket (202*).

Juneja made his IPL debut in 2013 (2013 Indian Premier League) against Kolkata Knight Riders. He was bought by Sunrisers Hyderabad at the 2014 IPL auction.

He was part of the Gujarat cricket team that won the Ranji Trophy in 2016-17 where he scored half-centuries in both innings. Juneja with skipper Parthiv Patel helped Gujarat beat defending champions Mumbai in the final in Indore. Gujarat had never reached the finals nor won a Ranji Trophy in over 66 years before that.
