= Udit Birla =

Indian cricketer (born 1989)

Personal information
- Full name: Udit Alok Birla
- Born: 17 November 1989 (age 36); Kolkata, Bengal, India
- Nickname: Udirla ka billa
- Batting: Right-handed
- Bowling: Right arm medium
- Role: Batsman

Domestic team information
- Years: Team
- 2011/12 – present: Madhya Pradesh
- 2013: Pune Warriors India

Career statistics
Competition	FC	T20
Matches	14	11
Runs scored	732	166
Batting average	34.85	20.75
100s/50s	0/7	0/1
Top score	74	56
Balls bowled	24	–
Wickets	1	–
Bowling average	29.00	–
5 wickets in innings	–	–
10 wickets in match	–	–
Best bowling		–
Catches/stumpings	7/–	21/–
- Source: ESPNcricinfo, 10 December 2013

Udit Alok Birla (born 17 November 1989) is an Indian cricketer. He studied in The Bishop's School, Pune. He is primarily a right-handed middle order batsman.

He was picked to play for Pune Warriors India in IPL 2013. He represents Madhya Pradesh in first class cricket.
