= Siddarth Kaul =

Indian cricketer

Siddharth Kaul
Personal information
- Born: 19 May 1990 (age 36); Pathankot, Punjab, India
- Nickname: Sid, Sidha, Sidders
- Batting: Right handed
- Bowling: Right-arm medium
- Role: Bowler
- Relatives: Uday Kaul (brother)

International information
- National side: India (2018–2019)
- ODI debut: 12 July 2018 v England
- Last ODI: 25 September 2018 v Afghanistan
- T20I debut: 29 June 2018 v Ireland
- Last T20I: 27 February 2019 v Australia

Domestic team information
- Years: Team
- 2007–present: Punjab
- 2013–2014: Delhi Daredevils (squad no. 9)
- 2016–2021: Sunrisers Hyderabad (squad no. 9)
- 2022–2023: Royal Challengers Bangalore
- 2024: Northamptonshire

Career statistics
Competition	ODI	T20I	FC	LA
Matches	3	3	89	112
Runs scored	1	–	877	353
Batting average	0.50	–	9.63	10.38
100s/50s	0/0	–	0/1	0/0
Top score	1	–	50	47
Balls bowled	162	58	15,469	5,529
Wickets	0	4	299	199
Bowling average	–	21.00	26.76	24.38
5 wickets in innings	–	0	17	8
10 wickets in match	–	0	0	0
Best bowling	–	2/35	6/27	6/39
Catches/stumpings	1/–	0/–	17/–	31/–
Medal record
Men's Cricket
Representing India
ACC Asia Cup
Winner	2018 United Arab Emirates
- Source: ESPNcricinfo, 1 July 2025

Siddarth Kaul (born 19 May 1990), also spelled Siddharth Kaul, is an Indian former professional cricketer. A fast bowler who bowls at about 130 km/h, he made his first-class debut for Punjab in 2007. Kaul was a part of the victorious India Under-19s team at the 2008 Under-19 Cricket World Cup and was named as one of the players to be drafted for the Indian Premier League, where he signed for the Kolkata Knight Riders. He was a part of the Indian squad which won the 2018 Asia Cup. In 2024, he retired from Indian cricket.

His father, Tej Kaul, played across three seasons in the 1970s for Jammu and Kashmir. His brother, Uday Kaul, also played for Punjab, and later for Chandigarh and Mizoram.

== Domestic career ==
After a successful tournament at the Under-19 World Cup in Malaysia, he started his domestic career for his home state of Punjab. A host of injuries derailed his smooth run and he was more out than in at the first-class level until 2012. However, then came the revival and Kaul has managed to spearhead the Punjab bowling line-up since then.

Kaul made his debut for the Punjab cricket team against Orissa in the 2007–08 Ranji Trophy, alongside his brother who was wicket-keeper for the match. He took a five-wicket haul in the first innings, and finished with figures of 5/97. He has also made appearances for the Punjab youth teams, at Under-15, Under-17 and Under-19 levels.

He was the leading wicket-taker for Punjab in the 2018–19 Vijay Hazare Trophy, with twelve dismissals in five matches. In October 2018, he was named in India A's squad for the 2018–19 Deodhar Trophy. In October 2019, he was named in India A's squad for the 2019–20 Deodhar Trophy.

== Indian Premier League ==
For the Indian Premier League's inaugural season, a number of members of the victorious India Under-19s team from the 2008 Under-19 Cricket World Cup and other specified youngsters were named as players to be drafted by teams in the Indian Premier League, whilst other youth players would have to be chosen to play for their local teams. Kaul was chosen by the Kolkata Knight Riders, based in Kolkata, West Bengal, and captained by Sourav Ganguly.

Sunrisers Hyderabad bid for him in the 2016 season, but he was benched for that season. 2017 saw the skiddy pacer shooting into the limelight for his 16 wickets in 10 games playing for SRH. He bowled some crucial overs for the David Warner-led team and was an ideal foil to Bhuvneshwar Kumar. In January 2018, he was bought by the Sunrisers Hyderabad in the 2018 IPL auction. He also had a successful 2018 season being a crucial cog in the bowling Attack of SRH that took them to their 2nd finals. In February 2022, he was bought by the Royal Challengers Bangalore in the auction for the 2022 Indian Premier League tournament. In 2023, Kaul was again retained by the Royal Challengers Bangalore at a base cost of 75 Lacs. Before the 2024 edition of the Indian Premier League, he was released by the Royal Challengers Bangalore, and was unsold at the auction.

== Under-19 career ==
Kaul was named in the squad for the India U-19s team for the 2008 Under-19 World Cup in Malaysia. He played in all of India's matches as they proceeded to the final, where they defeated the South African U-19 cricket team by 12 runs (adjusted by the DL method). Kaul was entrusted with the task of bowling the final over by his then skipper Virat Kohli against South Africa in Malaysia, where India won the Under-19 World Cup for the second time. The skiddy pacer ended with 10 wickets from 5 games and jointly led the Indian bowling charts alongside Ravindra Jadeja, who was the vice-captain of that side. His 10 wickets came at an average of 15.40, placing him as the joint tenth on the list of highest wicket-takers for the tournament.

== India A career ==
Kaul was part of India A cricket team for South Africa A Team Triangular Series in 2013 and 2017 South Africa A Team Tri-Series.

== International career ==
In November 2017, Kaul was named in India's One Day International (ODI) squad for their series against Sri Lanka, but he did not play. In May 2018, he was once again named in India's ODI squad, this time for the series against England, and the Twenty20 International (T20I) matches against England and Ireland. He made his Twenty20 International (T20I) debut for India against Ireland on 29 June 2018. He made his One Day International (ODI) debut for India against England on 12 July 2018.

== County stint ==
Kaul played three red-ball fixtures for Northamptonshire County Cricket Club in May 2024. He became the second Indian player to represent Northamptonshire during the season after Karun Nair.
