= Gurkeerat Singh =

Indian cricketer (born 1990)

Gurkeerat Singh Mann
Personal information
- Full name: Gurkeerat Rupinder Singh Mann
- Born: June 29, 1990 (age 36); Muktsar, Punjab, India
- Batting: Right-handed
- Bowling: Right-arm off break
- Role: All rounder

International information
- National side: India (2016)
- ODI debut (cap 209): 17 January 2016 v Australia
- Last ODI: 23 January 2016 v Australia

Domestic team information
- Years: Team
- 2011–2023: Punjab
- 2012–2017: Kings XI Punjab
- 2019–2020: Royal Challengers Bangalore

Career statistics
Competition	ODI	FC	LA	T20
Matches	3	49	77	87
Runs scored	13	2,942	2,703	1,386
Batting average	6.50	43.91	46.60	22.00
100s/50s	0/0	6/18	3/21	0/6
Top score	8	201*	108	93*
Balls bowled	60	3,515	1,151	168
Wickets	0	41	26	6
Bowling average	–	44.90	35.26	35.33
5 wickets in innings	–	1	1	0
10 wickets in match	–	0	0	0
Best bowling	–	5/38	5/29	2/15
Catches/stumpings	1/–	23/–	28/–	40/3
- Source: ESPNcricinfo, 5 May 2019

Gurkeerat Singh Mann (born 29 June 1990) is a former Indian professional cricketer who played for Punjab in domestic cricket.

A right-handed batsman and off break bowler, he appeared for Punjab Kings and Royal Challengers Bangalore in the IPL and was a regular in the India A team. Singh had a maiden call for the official Indian squad for the South Africa series in 2015. He made his One Day International debut for India against Australia on 17 January 2016. On 10 November 2023 he announced retirement from all cricket.

== Domestic career ==
Gurkeerat played for Punjab in Indian domestic cricket and represented North Zone in Duleep Trophy and Deodhar Trophy.

On 24 December 2014 while playing for Punjab, he made an unbeaten 73 runs to see his team to victory while chasing 205 for victory on the 4th day. He made his second hundred in first-class cricket against Karnataka. His 201 is also his highest score in first-class cricket.

On 14 August 2015, he made an unbeaten 87 runs off 81 balls in the Triangular Series Final against Australia A to help his team to the title. He walked in to bat with India A struggling at 82/5 and needing 145 more runs to win the match. He hit nine fours and two sixes in his knock.

He continued his good form against Bangladesh A team. In the first match of the three-match series, he made 65 runs off 59 balls to help India A go past 300. In the same match, he then achieved his best figure in List A cricket when his 5/29 helped bowl out Bangladesh A for 226.

In July 2018, he was named in the India Green squad for the 2018–19 Duleep Trophy. He was the leading run-scorer for Punjab in the 2018–19 Vijay Hazare Trophy, with 295 runs in six matches. He also appeared with Minerva Academy team.

== International career ==
After his impressive all-round performance against Bangladesh A Team, Mann was selected in India's 15 man Squad for the 5 match ODI series against South Africa. He was selected in the team for the one day series against Australia in January 2016.

Gurkeerat Singh Mann made his ODI debut against Australian Cricket Team in the third ODI of the 2016 series played in Melbourne.

== Indian Premier League ==
Mann played for Kings XI Punjab in the Indian Premier League from 2012 to 2017. He signed with the franchise in the 2012 IPL auction. He played as a lower-order finisher and played many notable cameos for his team. His catch to dismiss Ross Taylor of Pune Warriors India in a league game was voted the catch of the tournament for IPL 2013.

In January 2018, he was bought by the Delhi Daredevils in the 2018 IPL auction. In December 2018, he was bought by the Royal Challengers Bangalore in the player auction for the 2019 Indian Premier League.

In April 2021, he was bought by the Kolkata Knight Riders as replacement for Rinku Singh, who is out of the entire 2021 Indian Premier League due to knee injury. In February 2022, he was bought by the Gujarat Titans in the auction for the 2022 Indian Premier League tournament.
