= Railways cricket team =

Indian cricket team

Personnel
- Captain: Bhargav Merai (FC); Karn Sharma (LA & T20)
- Coach: ZUFRI
- Owner: Railways Sports Promotion Board

Team information
- Founded: 1958
- Home ground: Karnail Singh Stadium, New Delhi (and other stadiums)

History
- First-class debut: Eastern Punjab in 1958 at Gandhi Stadium, Jalandhar
- Ranji Trophy wins: 2
- Irani Cup wins: 2
- Vijay Hazare Trophy wins: 1
- Syed Mushtaq Ali Trophy wins: 0
- Official website: RSPB

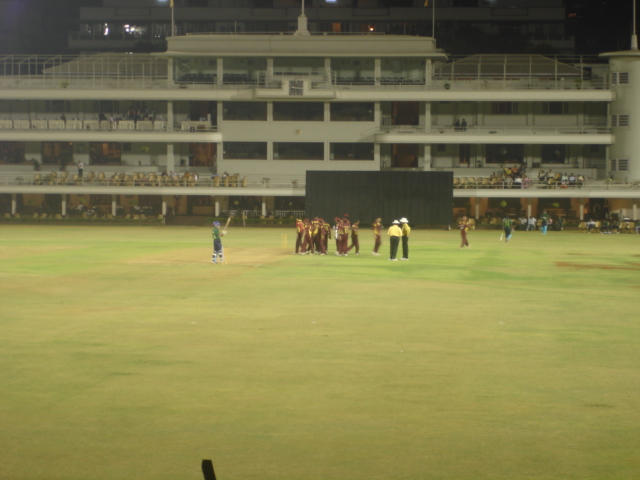
Railways playing against Odisha at Brabourne Stadium c.2006

Railways cricket team (also known as the Indian Railways) is a domestic cricket team in India representing Indian Railways. The team's home ground is East Coast Railway Stadium in Bhubaneswar and Karnail Singh Stadium in New Delhi. The team is run by the Railways Sports Promotion Board which fields the Railways cricket team in domestic cricket competitions in India such as the Ranji Trophy.

== Competition history ==
For most of its history, the Indian Railways has met little success in the Ranji Trophy. However, in recent years since 2000, Railways have won the trophy twice and become runners-up one time. As Champions of the Ranji Trophy, they have played the Irani Trophy twice, emerging victorious on both occasions.

== Honours ==
- Ranji Trophy
  - Winners (2): 2001–02, 2004–05
  - Runners-up (2): 1987–88, 2000–01
- Wills Trophy
  - Runners-up: 1988-89
- Vijay Hazare Trophy
  - Winners: 2005–06
  - Runners-up: 2013–14

== Notable players ==
Players from Railways who have played Test cricket for India, along with year of Test debut:

- Budhi Kunderan (1960)
- Murali Kartik (2000)
- Sanjay Bangar (2001)
- Karn Sharma (2014)

Players from Railways who have played ODI but not Test cricket for India, along with year of ODI debut:

- Jai Prakash Yadav (2002)

== Current squad ==
Players with international caps are listed in bold.

Name	Birth date	Birthplace	Batting style	Bowling style	Notes
Batsmen
Pratham Singh	31 August 1992 (age 34)	Delhi, DL	Left-handed	Right-arm off-break	
Ravi Singh	25 May 2001 (age 25)	Varanasi, UP	Left-handed	Right-arm leg-break	
Bhargav Merai	2 February 1992 (age 34)	Surat, GJ	Right-handed	Right-arm medium-fast	**First-class Captain**
Mohammad Saif	30 August 1996 (age 30)	Varanasi, UP	Left-handed	Slow left-arm orthodox	
Vivek Singh	1 November 1993 (age 33)	Howrah, WB	Left-handed		
Kush Marathe	12 December 2000 (age 25)	Vadodara, GJ	Right-handed	Right-arm off-break	
Sahab Yuvraj Singh	19 September 1997 (age 29)	Lucknow, UP	Right-handed	Right-arm medium-fast	
Eshaan Goyal	7 July 2003 (age 23)	Ballia, UP	Left-handed	Right-arm leg-break	
Jayant Lakhan	2 October 2001 (age 25)	Bhiwani, HR	Right-handed	Right-arm off-break	
All-rounders
Zubair Ali	22 December 2000 (age 25)		Right-handed	Right-arm medium	
Ansh Yadav	6 June 2003 (age 23)	Lucknow, UP	Right-handed	Right-arm off-break	
Kritagya Singh	25 September 2000 (age 26)	Lucknow, UP	Left-handed	Slow left-arm orthodox	
Wicket-keepers
Upendra Yadav	8 October 1996 (age 30)	Kanpur, UP	Right-handed		
Suraj Ahuja	23 September 1999 (age 27)	Sri Ganganagar, RJ	Right-handed		
Spin Bowlers
**Karn Sharma**	23 October 1987 (age 39)	Meerut, UP	Left-handed	Right-arm leg break	**List A & Twenty20 Captain**
Raj Choudhary	18 May 1996 (age 30)	Nagpur, MH	Left-handed	Slow left-arm orthodox	
Toufik Uddin Mondal	9 November 2002 (age 24)	Khelarampur, WB	Left-handed	Right-arm off-break	
Pradhyumn Parikh	12 February 2001 (age 25)	Udaipur, RJ	Right-handed	Right-arm leg-break	
Mohit Raut	20 January 1998 (age 28)	Akola, MH	Right-handed	Slow left arm orthodox	
Pace Bowlers
Kunal Yadav	23 December 1999 (age 26)	Jhansi, UP	Right-handed	Right-arm medium	
Adarsh Singh	12 January 1999 (age 27)	Rewa, MP	Right-handed	Right-arm medium-fast	
Rahul Sharma	30 December 1990 (age 35)	Agra, UP	Left-handed	Left-arm medium	
Atal Bihari Rai	5 August 1999 (age 27)	Allahabad, UP	Right-handed	Right-arm medium	

Updated as on 17 November 2026
