= 1972–73 Irani Cup =

Indian cricket match

The 1972–73 Irani Cup match was played from 27 to 30 October 1972 at the Nehru Stadium, Pune. The reigning Ranji Trophy champions Bombay defeated Rest of India by 220 runs.

== Scorecard ==
27-30 October 1972
Scorecard

Bombay	v	Rest of India
236 (106.3 overs); Ramnath Parkar 70; Pandurang Salgaoncar 4/56 (21.3 overs)		110 (49.3 overs); Pandurang Salgaoncar 24; Padmakar Shivalkar 6/34 (13.3 overs)
443/9d (118 overs); Ramnath Parkar 195; Srinivas Venkataraghavan 2/87 (37 overs)		349 (117.5 overs); Gundappa Viswanath 161*; Ajit Naik 3/59 (14 overs)

Bombay won by 220 runs
Nehru Stadium, Pune
Umpires: Judah Reuben and MV Nagendra

- Rest of India won the toss and elected to field.
