= 1993–94 Irani Cup =

Indian cricket match

The 1993–94 Irani Cup was played from 29 September - 4 October 1993 at the Feroz Shah Kotla Ground in Ludhiana. Rest of India defeated the reigning Ranji Trophy champions Punjab181 runs.

== Scorecard ==
29 September - 4 October 1993
Scorecard

Rest of India	v	Delhi
347 (107.5 overs); Rahul Dravid 93; Bhupinder Singh 6/103 (34.2 overs)		234 (99.3 overs); Vikram Rathour 74; Prashant Vaidya 4/69 (23.3 overs)
253 (92.4 overs); Nayan Mongia 100*; Bhupinder Singh 4/81 (32.4 overs)		185 (82.5 overs); Navjot Singh Sidhu 88; Rajesh Chauhan 5/29 (12 overs)

Rest of India won by 181 runs
Punjab Agricultural University Ground, Ludhiana, Punjab
Umpires: AL Narasimhan and RT Ramachandran

- Rest of India won the toss and elected to bat.
