= 1976–77 Irani Cup =

Indian cricket match

The 1976–77 Irani Cup match was played from 14 to 16 October 1976 at the Feroz Shah Kotla in Delhi. The reigning Ranji Trophy champions Bombay defeated Rest of India by 10 wickets. This was Bombay's third back-to-back Irani Cup title.

== Scorecard ==
14-16 October 1976
Scorecard

Rest of India	v	Bombay
173 (80.3 overs); Yajurvindra Singh 61; Ranjan Baindoor 4/32 (15.3 overs)		327 (116.3 overs); Ashok Mankad 94; Barun Burman 4/61 (19.3 overs)
183 (62 overs); Madan Lal 61*; Padmakar Shivalkar 6/88 (28 overs)		30/0 (4 overs); Sunil Gavaskar 15*

Bombay won by 10 wickets
Feroz Shah Kotla, Delhi
Umpires: B Satyaji Rao and MV Nagendra

- Rest of India won the toss and elected to bat.
