= 1975–76 Irani Cup =

Indian cricket match

The 1975–76 Irani Cup match was played from 30 October - 2 November 1975 at the Vidarbha Cricket Association Ground in Nagpur. The match between the reigning Ranji Trophy champions Bombay and Rest of India was a draw. Bombay won the Irani Cup due to their first innings lead.

== Scorecard ==
30 October - 2 November 1975
Scorecard

Rest of India	v	Bombay
210 (79.5 overs); Gundappa Viswanath 72; Padmakar Shivalkar 6/74 (32 overs)		305 (97.4 overs); Dilip Vengsarkar 110; Erapalli Prasanna 6/110(33 overs)
212 (77 overs); Gundappa Viswanath 52; Karsan Ghavri 5/63 (31 overs)		13/0; Sudhik Nair 12*

Match drawn
Vidarbha Cricket Association Ground, Nagpur
Umpires: Mohammad Ghouse and SN Hanumantha Rao

- Bombay won the toss and elected to field.
- No play was possible on Day 1 (October 30) due to rain.
- Bishan Singh Bedi (Rest of India) was absent hurt from his team's second innings.
  Bombay won the Irani Cup due to their first innings lead.
