= Irani Trophy =

First-class cricket championship game in India

- Countries: India
- Administrator: BCCI
- Format: First-class cricket
- First edition: 1959–60
- Latest edition: 2025–26
- Next edition: 2026–27
- Tournament format: One-off
- Number of teams: 2
- Current champion: Rest of India (31st title)
- Most successful: Rest of India (31 titles)
- Qualification: Ranji Trophy
- Most runs: Wasim Jaffer (1,294)
- Most wickets: Padmakar Shivalkar (51)

The Irani Trophy, also known as the Z R Irani Trophy, is an annual one-off First-Class cricket match organised by the BCCI and contested each season by the reigning Ranji Trophy champions and a multi-state RoI team composed of players from the other state teams. The inaugural edition was played in March 1960 as a special event to commemorate the 25th anniversary of the Ranji Trophy. It was intended to be a one-off match but, in 1962, BCCI decided to institute it as annual fixture and it has been played in most seasons since 1962–63. BCCI named the Irani Trophy after Zal R. Irani, their long-serving president and treasurer, who was a significant figure in the organisation from its inception in 1928, till his death in 1970.

== History ==
The first match between the Ranji Trophy champions and the Rest of India was played in 1959–60. It was intended to be a one-off event to commemorate the 25th anniversary of the Ranji Trophy. In 1962, the Board of Control for Cricket in India (BCCI) decided to resurrect it as an annual event, although it did not take place in 1964–65. The trophy was named in honour of Zal R. Irani, who was a long time treasurer and president of BCCI, and a keen patron of the game. The first three matches were played towards the end of the season but then, having recognised the fixture's prestige, BCCI moved it to the beginning of the season and, from 1965–66 to 2012–13, it traditionally heralded the start of each new domestic season.

In 2013, the fixture was moved to a date immediately after the Ranji Trophy final, resulting in there being two Irani Cup matches in the 2012/13 season. The fixture has since remained at the end of the season, and is played shortly after the Ranji Trophy final. Two matches were cancelled due to the COVID-19 pandemic and, in 2022, BCCI decided to organise two editions back-to-back. These were the 2019–20 and 2022–23 matches, which were played at Rajkot and Indore respectively.

== Results ==
The following table lists the results of all Irani Trophy matches. The source shows that ROI have taken part in all 61 matches to the most recent in October 2023, winning 26 with 25 losses and eight draws. By far the most appearances by a single state side is 29 by Mumbai, who have won the trophy twelve times. Karnataka have played in eight matches, winning six; and Delhi in seven, winning two. Four teams have appeared twice: Railways (two wins); Vidarbha (two draws); Rajasthan (two defeats); and Saurashtra (two defeats). Another nine teams have appeared once.

Season	Venue	Winner	Runner-up	Result	Notes	Refs
1959–60	Karnail Singh Stadium	Mumbai	Rest of India	match drawn	The inaugural match was meant to be a one-off event to commemorate the 25th anniversary of the Ranji Trophy. Bombay won the drawn game by achieving first innings lead. Three Test batsmen — Polly Umrigar, Nari Contractor, and M. L. Jaisimha — scored centuries in the match.	
1960–61	no competition					
1961–62	no competition					
1962–63	Brabourne Stadium	Mumbai	Rest of India	match drawn	Bombay won the Irani Cup through their first innings lead.	
1963–64	Neelam Sanjiva Reddy Stadium	Mumbai	Rest of India	109 runs		
1964–65	no competition					
1965–66	Jawaharlal Nehru Stadium (Chennai)	—N/a	—N/a	match drawn	Although this match was drawn, the first innings lead tie-break rule could not be enforced since both first innings were not completed. Bombay and Rest of India shared the trophy. (Note: Usually, if the match is drawn, the trophy is awarded to the team which had first innings lead. There was an exception to this in 1965–66, when the trophy was shared because both first innings could not be completed.)	
1966–67	Eden Gardens	Rest of India	Mumbai	6 wickets		
1967–68	Brabourne Stadium	Mumbai	Rest of India	match drawn	Bombay won the Irani Cup through their first innings lead.	
1968–69	Brabourne Stadium	Rest of India	Mumbai	119 runs		
1969–70	Pune Club Ground	Mumbai	Rest of India	match drawn	Bombay won the Irani Cup through their first innings lead.	
1970–71	Eden Gardens	Mumbai	Rest of India	match drawn	Bombay won the Irani Cup through their first innings lead.	
1971–72	Brabourne Stadium	Rest of India	Mumbai	119 runs		
1972–73	Nehru Stadium, Pune	Mumbai	Rest of India	220 runs		
1973–74	M. Chinnaswamy Stadium	Rest of India	Mumbai	match drawn	Rest of India won the Irani Cup through their first innings lead.	
1974–75	Sardar Vallabhbhai Patel Stadium, Navrangpura	Karnataka	Rest of India	match drawn	Karnataka won the Irani Cup through their first innings lead.	
1975–76	Vidarbha Cricket Association Ground	Mumbai	Rest of India	match drawn	Bombay won the Irani Cup through their first innings lead.	
1976–77	Arun Jaitley Cricket Stadium	Mumbai	Rest of India	10 wickets		
1977–78	Wankhede Stadium	Rest of India	Mumbai	innings and 168 runs		
1978–79	M. Chinnaswamy Stadium	Rest of India	Karnataka	9 wickets		
1979–80	Gandhi Stadium	—N/a	—N/a	abandoned	Heavy rain caused the match between ROI and Delhi to be abandoned without a ball bowled. No toss was made and the Irani Cup was shared.	
1980–81	Arun Jaitley Cricket Stadium	Delhi	Rest of India	match drawn	Delhi won the Irani Cup through their first innings lead.	
1981–82	Nehru Stadium, Indore	Mumbai	Rest of India	match drawn	Bombay won the Irani Cup through their first innings lead.	
1982–83	Arun Jaitley Cricket Stadium	Rest of India	Delhi	5 wickets		
1983–84	Madhavrao Scindia Cricket Ground	Karnataka	Rest of India	match drawn	Karnataka won the Irani Cup through their first innings lead.	
1984–85	Arun Jaitley Cricket Stadium	Rest of India	Mumbai	4 wickets		
1985–86	Vidarbha Cricket Association Ground	Mumbai	Rest of India	match drawn	Bombay won the Irani Cup through their first innings lead.	
1986–87	Barkatullah Khan Stadium	Rest of India	Delhi	innings and 232 runs		
1987–88	Gymkhana Ground, Secunderabad	Hyderabad	Rest of India	match drawn	Hyderabad won the Irani Cup through their first innings lead.	
1988–89	M. A. Chidambaram Stadium	Tamil Nadu	Rest of India	3 wickets		
1989–90	Wankhede Stadium	Delhi	Rest of India	309 runs		
1990–91	M. Chinnaswamy Stadium	Rest of India	Bengal	match drawn	Rest of India won the Irani Cup through their first innings lead.	
1991–92	Nahar Singh Stadium	Haryana	Rest of India	4 wickets		
1992–93	Arun Jaitley Cricket Stadium	Rest of India	Delhi	innings and 122 runs		
1993–94	Punjab Agricultural University Stadium	Rest of India	Punjab	181 runs		
1994–95	Wankhede Stadium	Mumbai	Rest of India	match drawn	Bombay won the Irani Cup through their first innings lead.	
1995–96	Wankhede Stadium	Mumbai	Rest of India	9 wickets		
1996–97	M. Chinnaswamy Stadium	Karnataka	Rest of India	5 wickets		
1997–98	Wankhede Stadium	Mumbai	Rest of India	54 runs		
1998–99	M. Chinnaswamy Stadium	Karnataka	Rest of India	match drawn	Karnataka won the Irani Cup through their first innings lead.	
1999–2000	M. Chinnaswamy Stadium	Rest of India	Karnataka	innings and 60 runs		
2000–01	Wankhede Stadium	Rest of India	Mumbai	10 wickets		
2001–02	Vidarbha Cricket Association Ground	Rest of India	Baroda	6 wickets		
2002–03	Karnail Singh Stadium	Railways	Rest of India	5 wickets		
2003–04	M. A. Chidambaram Stadium	Rest of India	Mumbai	3 wickets		
2004–05	I. S. Bindra Stadium	Rest of India	Mumbai	290 runs		
2005–06	Karnail Singh Stadium	Railways	Rest of India	9 wickets		
2006–07	Vidarbha Cricket Association Ground	Rest of India	Uttar Pradesh	9 wickets		
2007–08	Madhavrao Scindia Cricket Ground	Rest of India	Mumbai	9 wickets		
2008–09	Reliance Stadium	Rest of India	Delhi	187 runs		
2009–10	Vidarbha Cricket Association Stadium	Rest of India	Mumbai	match drawn	Rest of India won the Irani Cup through their first innings lead.	
2010–11	Sawai Mansingh Stadium	Rest of India	Mumbai	361 runs		
2011–12	Sawai Mansingh Stadium	Rest of India	Rajasthan	404 runs		
2012–13	M. Chinnaswamy Stadium	Rest of India	Rajasthan	innings and 79 runs		
2013	Wankhede Stadium	Rest of India	Mumbai	match drawn	Rest of India won the Irani Cup through their first innings lead.	
2013–14	M. Chinnaswamy Stadium	Karnataka	Rest of India	innings and 222 runs		
2014–15	M. Chinnaswamy Stadium	Karnataka	Rest of India	246 runs		
2015–16	Brabourne Stadium	Rest of India	Mumbai	4 wickets		
2016–17	Brabourne Stadium	Rest of India	Gujarat	6 wickets		
2017–18	Vidarbha Cricket Association Stadium	Vidarbha	Rest of India	match drawn	Vidarbha won the Irani Cup through their first innings lead.	
2018–19	Vidarbha Cricket Association Stadium	Vidarbha	Rest of India	match drawn	Vidarbha won the Irani Cup through their first innings lead.	
2019–20	Niranjan Shah Stadium	Rest of India	Saurashtra	8 wickets		
2020–21	In both of these seasons, the fixture was cancelled because of the COVID-19 pandemic					
2021–22	In both of these seasons, the fixture was cancelled because of the COVID-19 pandemic					
2022–23	Captain Roop Singh Stadium	Rest of India	Madhya Pradesh	238 runs		
2023–24	Niranjan Shah Stadium	Rest of India	Saurashtra	175 runs		
2024–25	Ekana Cricket Stadium	Mumbai	Rest of India	match drawn	Mumbai won the Irani Cup through their first innings lead.	
2025–26	Vidarbha Cricket Association Stadium	Vidarbha	Rest of India	93 runs		
2026–27	Sher-e-Kashmir Stadium	Rest of India	Jammu & Kashmir	167 runs		

== Statistics ==
=== Team statistics ===
	Appearances			
Team	Total	Champions	Runners-up	Shared/No Result
Rest of India	63	31	30	2
Mumbai	30	15	14	1
Karnataka	8	6	2	—N/a
Delhi	7	2	4	1
Railways	2	2	0	—N/a
Rajasthan	2	0	2	—N/a
Vidarbha	3	3	0	—N/a
Saurashtra	2	0	2	—N/a
Hyderabad	1	1	0	—N/a
Tamil Nadu	1	1	0	—N/a
Haryana	1	1	0	—N/a
Bengal	1	0	1	—N/a
Punjab	1	0	1	—N/a
Baroda	1	0	1	—N/a
Uttar Pradesh	1	0	1	—N/a
Gujarat	1	0	1	—N/a
Madhya Pradesh	1	0	1	—N/a
Jammu & Kashmir	1	0	1	—N/a

== Broadcasters ==
BCCI's official broadcasters Sports18 and JioCinema air the match live on TV and internet respectively. BCCI's website, bcci.tv, airs match highlights and scores.

== Sponsorship ==
Period	Sponsor	Brand
2007–2010	World Sport Group	
2010–2013	Bharti Airtel	Airtel Irani Cup
2013–2014	Star India Pvt. Ltd.	Star Irani Cup
2014–2015	Micromax Informatics	Micromax Irani Cup
2015–2022	Paytm	Paytm Irani Cup
2022–2023	Mastercard	Mastercard Irani Cup
2023–present	IDFC First Bank	IDFC First Irani Cup
