= 1979–80 Irani Cup =

Indian cricket match

The 1979–80 Irani Cup match was scheduled to be played between 1–5 February 1980 at the Gandhi Stadium in Jalandhar between Rest of India and the reigning Ranji Trophy champions Delhi. No play was possible due to rain and the match was abandoned without a toss. This was only the second time that the Irani Cup was shared between two teams, after the 1965–66 Irani Cup.

== Scorecard ==
1-5 February 1980
Scorecard

Rest of India	v	Delhi

Match abandoned
Gandhi Stadium, Jalandhar
Umpires: Piloo Reporter and V. K. Ramaswamy

- No toss
- No play was possible due to rain
