= 1985–86 Irani Cup =

Indian cricket match

The 1985–86 Irani Cup match was played from 24 to 28 October 1985 at the Vidarbha Cricket Association Ground in Nagpur. The reigning Ranji Trophy champions Bombay drew with Rest of India but won the Irani Cup through their first innings lead.

== Scorecard ==
24-28 October 1985
Scorecard

Bombay	v	Rest of India
472 (140.5 overs); Chandrakant Pandit 123; Rajinder Singh Ghai 6/130 (37.5 overs)		312/9d (89.1 overs); Mohammad Azharuddin 100*; Ravi Shastri 4/68 (30 overs)
400 (101.1 overs); Shishir Hattangadi 85; Laxman Sivaramakrishnan 3/132 (30.1 overs)		338/7 (117 overs); Krishna Bhaskar Pillai (103*); Kiran Mokashi 4/101 (36 overs)

Match drawn
Vidarbha Cricket Association Ground, Nagpur
Umpires: Bhairab Ganguli and MG Subramaniam

- Bombay won the toss and elected to bat.
- Bombay won the Irani Cup through their first innings lead.
