= 1974–75 Irani Cup =

Indian cricket match

The 1974–75 Irani Cup match was played from 24 to 27 October 1974 at the Sardar Vallabhbhai Patel Stadium, Ahmedabad. The match between the reigning Ranji Trophy champions Karnataka and Rest of India was a draw. Karnataka won the Irani Cup due to their first innings lead, winning their first Irani Cup. It was the first Irani Cup not to feature Bombay.

== Scorecard ==
24-27 October 1974
Scorecard

Karnataka	v	Rest of India
359 (120 overs); Sudhakar Rao 115; Bishan Singh Bedi 5/111 (42 overs)		307 (113 overs); Sunil Gavaskar 156*; Erapalli Prasanna 5/78 (41 overs)
314/2d (84.1 overs); Gundappa Viswanath 200*; Pandurang Salgaonkar 1/37 (12 overs)		214/3 (50.4 overs); Gopal Bose 100; K Lakshman 1/40 (15 overs)

Match drawn
Sardar Vallabhbhai Patel Stadium, Ahmedabad
Umpires: AN Desai and Dara Dotiwalla

- Karnataka won the toss and elected to bat.
- Karnataka won the Irani Cup due to their first innings lead.
