= 1971–72 Irani Cup =

Indian cricket match

The 1971–72 Irani Cup match was played from 21 to 24 October 1971 at the Brabourne Stadium in Bombay. Rest of India defeated the reigning Ranji Trophy champions Bombay defeated by 111 runs.

== Scorecard ==
21-24 October 1971
Scorecard

Rest of India	v	(H) Mumbai
287 (120.1 overs); Mohinder Amarnath 67; Padmakar Shivalkar 4/56 (29 overs)		195 (79.2 overs); Ramnath Parkar 58; Srinivas Venkataraghavan 3/39 (22 overs)
236 (90.5 overs); Gundappa Viswanath 109; Abdul Ismail 4/26 (15.5 overs)		217 (65 overs); Sunil Gavaskar 48; Bhagwath Chandrasekhar 4/63 (16 overs)

Rest of India won by 111 runs
Brabourne Stadium, Bombay
Umpires: Ahmed Mamsa and PR Karmarkar

- Rest of India won the toss and elected to bat.
