= 2002–03 Irani Cup =

Indian cricket match

The 2002–03 Irani Cup match was played between 29 October and 2 November 2002 at the Karnail Singh Stadium in Delhi. The reigning Ranji Trophy champions Railways defeated Rest of India by 5 wickets.

== Scorecard ==
29 October - 2 November 2002
Scorecard

Rest of India	v	Railways
266 (131.4 overs); Aakash Chopra 92 (253); Kulamani Parida 5/90 (35.4 overs)		316 (109.2 overs); Jai Prakash Yadav 104 (227); Saurasish Lahiri 3/55 (10.2 overs)
292 (117.2 overs); Wasim Jaffer 116 (321); Jai Prakash Yadav 6/39 (22 overs)		244/5 (70.2 overs); Yere Goud 87* (152); Tinu Yohannan 2/56 (19 overs)

Railways won by 5 wickets.
Karnail Singh Stadium, Delhi
Umpires: Krishna Hariharan and S. K. Sharma

- Rest of India won the toss and elected to bat.
