= 1977–78 Irani Cup =

Indian cricket match

The 1977–78 Irani Cup match was played from 26 to 29 January 1978 at the Wankhede Stadium in Bombay. Rest of India defeated the reigning Ranji Trophy champions Bombay defeated by an innings and 168 runs.

== Scorecard ==
26 to 29 January 1978
Scorecard

Rest of India	v	(H) Bombay
540/5d (183.1 overs); Parthasarthi Sharma 206; Suru Nayak 3/122 (35.1 overs)		142 (62.1 overs); Vijay Mohanraj 53; Rajinder Hans 4/18 (11 overs)
		230 (101.5 overs) Following on Rahul Mankad 97; Dhiraj Parsana 5/83 (41.5 overs)

Rest of India won by an innings and 168 runs
Wankhede Stadium, Bombay
Umpires: Har Sharma and MV Nagendra

- Rest of India won the toss and elected to bat.
