= 1986–87 Irani Cup =

Indian cricket match

The 1986–87 Irani Cup match was played from 6–12 November 1986 at the Barkatullah Khan Stadium in Jodhpur. Rest of India defeated the reigning Ranji Trophy champions Delhi by an innings and 232 runs.

== Scorecard ==
6-12 November 1986
Scorecard

| Delhi | v | Rest of India |
| 266 (81.1 overs); Manoj Prabhakar 75; Bharat Arun 4/59 (20.1 overs) | | 637 (233 overs); Shrikant Kalyani 165; Maninder Singh 5/185 (79 overs) |
| 139 (45.5 overs); Manoj Prabhakar 28*; Azim Khan 6/29 (15.5 overs) |

Rest of India won by an innings and 232 runs
Barkatullah Khan Stadium, Jodhpur
Umpires: Ramchandra Rao and Sunit Ghosh

- Delhi won the toss and elected to bat.
- November 9 was a rest day.
