= 1997–98 Irani Cup =

Indian cricket match

The 1997–98 Irani Cup match was played 30 September - 4 October 1997 at the Wankhede Stadium in Mumbai. The reigning Ranji Trophy champions, Mumbai defeated the Rest of India by 54 runs.

Sairaj Bahutule's match figures of 13/168 were only the second instance of a bowler taking 13-wickets in an Irani Cup match, after Anil Kumble in the 1992–93 Irani Cup.

== Scorecard ==
30 September - 4 October 1997
Scorecard

(H) Mumbai	v	Rest of India
473 (177.5 overs); Jatin Paranjape 113; Anil Kumble 4/140 (57.5 overs)		279 (129.3 overs); Nayan Mongia 78; Sairaj Bahutule 5/97 (49 overs)
93 (50 overs); Amit Pagnis 22*; Anil Kumble 7/33 (17 overs)		233 (80.5 overs); Aashish Kapoor (50); Sairaj Bahutule 8/71 (31.5 overs)

Mumbai won by 54 runs
Wankhede Stadium, Mumbai
Umpires: K Murali and Rangachari Vijayaraghavan

- Mumbai won the toss and elected to bat.
