= 1991–92 Irani Cup =

Indian cricket match

The 1991–92 Irani Cup was played from 1–5 October 1991 at the Nahar Singh Stadium in Faridabad. The reigning Ranji Trophy champions Haryana defeated Rest of India by 4 wickets.

== Scorecard ==
1-5 October 1991
Scorecard

Rest of India	v	Haryana
518/9d (177 overs); Woorkeri Raman 149; Chetan Sharma 4/90 (39 overs)		459 (157 overs); Kapil Dev 135; Javagal Srinath 5/120 (41 overs)
144 (43.1 overs); Pravin Amre 40; Kapil Dev 4/26 (7 overs)		207/6 (51.4 overs); Kapil Dev 53; Maninder Singh 5/79 (24.4 overs)

Haryana won by 4 wickets
Nahar Singh Stadium, Faridabad
Umpires: Sanjay Shah and SK Sharma

- Rest of India won the toss and elected to bat.
