= Punjab Agricultural University =

State Agricultural University in Punjab, India

- Other name: PAU
- Type: Public
- Established: 1962; 64 years ago
- Affiliations: UGC, ICAR
- Chancellor: Governor of Punjab
- Vice-Chancellor: Dr. Harvinder Singh Dhaliwal
- Location: Ludhiana, Punjab, India; 30.902°N 75.807°E
- Campus: Urban
- Website: www.pau.edu

Punjab Agricultural University (PAU) is a public funded agricultural university located in Ludhiana, Punjab, India. It is a central agricultural university in India established under Harayana and Punjab Agricultural Universities Act 1970 enacted by Parliament in the Twenty first Year of the Republic of India. It was established in 1962 and is the nation's third-oldest agricultural university, after Govind Ballabh Pant University of Agriculture & Technology, Pantnagar and Odisha University of Agriculture and Technology, Bhubaneshwar.

It was formally inaugurated by the then Prime Minister of India, Pandit Jawaharlal Nehru, on 8 July 1962. PAU pioneered the Green Revolution in India in the 1960s. It was bifurcated in 2005 with the formation of Guru Angad Dev Veterinary and Animal Sciences University (GADVASU).

The Farmers Fair, which have been organised by the PAU since 1967, see the footfall of at least one lakh farmers in two days on PAU campus in Ludhiana, Punjab (bi-annually in March and September). Farmers not only from Punjab, but also from neighbouring states such as Haryana, Rajasthan, Himachal Pradesh, etc., travel to the PAU campus to buy high-quality seeds, farm equipment and gain knowledge on new agricultural technologies in the two-day main fair event.

The National Institutional Ranking Framework (NIRF) ranked the university 3rd in its agriculture and allied sectors ranking 2024. It has its jurisdiction over entire state of Punjab.

== About ==
The university has six constituent colleges, viz. College of Agriculture, PAU-College of Agriculture Ballowal Saunkri, College of Agricultural Engineering & Technology, College of Basic Sciences & Humanities, College of Community Science & College of Horticulture and Forestry, besides PAU Pre-Graduation Institutes of Agriculture at Gurdaspur and Bathinda.

The university has 18 Krishi Vigyan Kendras (KVKs) in districts Amritsar, Bathinda, Faridkot, Fatehgarh Sahib, Ferozepur, Samrala (Ludhiana), Pathankot, Gurdaspur, Hoshiarpur, Noor Mahal (Jalandhar), Kapurthala, Langroya (SBS Nagar), Mansa, Moga, Ropar, Patiala, Sangrur and Mukatsar Sahib.

== Sports ==
Punjab Agricultural University Stadium is a multi-purpose stadium located in the campus. The stadium has facilities for cricket, football, hockey, and other sports. There is an astroturf field for hockey. In addition to this there is a swimming pool and a velodrome.

There are facilities for indoor sports such as basketball, badminton, gymnastics, handball, volleyball, lawn tennis, table tennis, weight lifting and kabaddi etc. The Ground has also hosted 10 Ranji including a final in 1993 where Punjab defeated Maharashtra to win their only Ranji Trophy title and one Irani Trophy matches from 1987 to 1999 and 10 List A matches.

== Notable alumni ==
- Jaswinder Bhalla
- Baldev Singh Dhillon
- Deep Saini
- Mohinder Singh Randhawa
