= 1973–74 Irani Cup =

Indian cricket match

The 1973–74 Irani Cup match was played from 8–11 November 1973 at the M. Chinnaswamy Stadium in Bangalore. The match between the reigning Ranji Trophy champions Bombay and Rest of India was a draw. Rest of India won the Irani Cup through their first innings lead.

== Scorecard ==
8–11 November 1973
Scorecard

Rest of India	v	Bombay
444 (180.5 overs); Gopal Bose 170; Abdul Ismail 4/68 (31 overs)		233 (84.2 overs); Milinde Rege 67; Bhagwath Chandrasekhar 4/71 (31.2 overs)
77/2 (27 overs); Parthasarthi Sharma 46*; Abdul Ismail 2/11 (8 overs)		372/8d (106 overs) (following on); Sunil Gavaskar 108*; Parthasarthi Sharma 2/32 (12 overs)

Match drawn
M. Chinnaswamy Stadium, Bangalore
Umpires: B Satyaji Rao and MV Nagendra

- Rest of India won the toss and elected to bat.
- Rest of India won the Irani Cup due to their first innings lead.
