= 1959–60 Irani Cup =

Annual Indian cricket fixture

Bombay	Rest of India
344	298
&	&
210/5d	111/7
- Match drawn; Bombay won the match by 1st innings lead
- Date: 18–20 March 1960
- Venue: Feroz Shah Kotla, Delhi
- Umpires: K. B. Saxena and Sudhendu Bhattacharya

The 1959–60 Irani Cup was the inaugural edition of the Irani Cup, an annual first-class cricket fixture in India which matches the previous season's Ranji Trophy winners against a multi-state team called the Rest of India (ROI). The concept was devised by the Board of Control for Cricket in India (BCCI) to commemorate the 25th anniversary of the Ranji Trophy. The trophy was named after Zal R. Irani, the BCCI President.

Played from 18 to 20 March 1960, the first edition was between Rest of India and Bombay at the Feroz Shah Kotla in Delhi. The match ended in a draw but Bombay were declared winners because a tie-break rule was in force that awarded the match to the team with first innings lead.

Bombay captain Polly Umrigar won the toss and decided to bat first. The team batted through the whole of the first day and their last wicket fell just before close of play. They were all out for 344, Umrigar himself scoring 102. He was supported by fellow Test batsmen Madhav Apte (98) and Gulabrai Ramchand (82). ROI's best bowler was off spinner Jasu Patel, who took 5/98. ROI began their first innings next morning and were all out for 298, again just before close of play. Test batsmen Nari Contractor (108) and Motganhalli Jaisimha (105) shared a second wicket partnership of 196 but the rest of the batting struggled against the leg spin and googly bowler Hoshang Amroliwala, who took 6/44. On the final day, Bombay declared on 210/5, setting ROI a target of 247. They had made 111/7 when time ran out and Bombay won by virtue of their first innings lead.

== Squads ==
Bombay	Rest of India
Polly Umrigar (c); Naren Tamhane (wk); Madhav Apte; Sudhakar Adhikari; Vishwanath Lele; Ramnath Kenny; Gulabrai Ramchand; Hoshang Amroliwala; Sharad Diwadkar; Karkulu Pai; Ghulam Guard	Nari Contractor (c); Budhi Kunderan (wk); Motganhalli Jaisimha; Rusi Surti; A. G. Milkha Singh; Bal Dani; Rusi Modi; Khandu Rangnekar; Prem Bhatia; Ranga Sohoni; Jasubhai Patel

== Match ==
18–20 March
Scorecard

Bombay	v	Rest of India
344 (86.2 overs); Polly Umrigar 102; Jasubhai Patel 5/98 (23 overs)		298 (79.1 overs); Nari Contractor 108; Hoshang Amroliwala 6/44 (9.1 overs)
210/5d (54 overs); Hoshang Amroliwala 76*; Rusi Surti 4/63 (17 overs)		111/7 (29 overs); Prem Bhatia 50; Hoshang Amroliwala 2/33 (7 overs)

Match drawn
Feroz Shah Kotla, Delhi
Umpires: K. B. Saxena and Sudhendu Bhattacharya

- Bombay won the toss and elected to bat first.
- Bombay won the match by virtue of 1st innings lead.
