= Rest of India cricket team =

Indian cricket team which plays exclusively in the Irani Cup

Rest of india
- Rest of India cricket team's logo

Personnel
- Captain: Rajat Patidar

Team information
- Colours: Cricket Whites
- Founded: 1960

History
- First-class debut: Bombay in 1960 at Feroz Shah Kotla, Delhi
- Irani Cup wins: 33 (31 wins and 2 shared)

Rest of India cricket team (ROI) is a first-class cricket team in India that is composed of players from across the country except for those from the current Ranji Trophy winners. It competes annually against the Ranji Trophy winner for the Irani Cup, in a "The Best vs Best of the Rest" tournament. The team was officially instituted for the 1959–60 Irani Cup, playing its first match on 18 March 1960 against the Bombay.

Rest of India has won Irani Cup 30 times (outright wins and first innings leads in drawn matches) and shared the trophy twice (with Bombay in 1965–66 and Delhi in 1979–80).

== Honours ==
- Irani Cup (31) : 1966–67, 1968–69, 1971–72, 1973–74, 1977–78, 1978–79, 1982–83, 1984–85, 1986–87, 1990–91, 1992–93, 1993–94, 1999–2000, 2000–01, 2001–02, 2003–04, 2004–05, 2006–07, 2007–08, 2008–09, 2009–10, 2010–11, 2011–12, 2012–13, 2013, 2015–16, 2016–17, 2019–20, 2022–23, 2023–24, 2026–27; (2 shared) – 1965–66, 1979–80

== Captains ==
Year	Captain	Ranji Team
1959	Nari Contractor	Gujarat
1962	Pankaj Roy	Bengal
1963	Chandu Borde	Maharashtra
1965	Chandu Borde	Maharashtra
1966	Mansoor Ali Khan Pataudi	Hyderabad
1967	Mansoor Ali Khan Pataudi	Hyderabad
1968	Hanumant Singh	Hyderabad
1969	Mansoor Ali Khan Pataudi	Hyderabad
1970	Chandu Borde	Baroda
1971	Srinivasaraghavan Venkataraghavan	Madras
1972	Srinivasaraghavan Venkataraghavan	Madras
1973	Erapalli Prasanna	Karnataka
1974	Mansoor Ali Khan Pataudi	Hyderabad
1975	Bishan Singh Bedi	Delhi
1976	Bishan Singh Bedi	Delhi
1977	Parthasarathy Sharma	Rajasthan
1978	Srinivasaraghavan Venkataraghavan	Madras
1979	—N/a	
1980	Sunil Gavaskar	Bombay
1981	Gundappa Viswanath	Karnataka
1982	Sunil Gavaskar	Bombay
1983	Mohinder Amarnath	Delhi
1984	Kapil Dev	Haryana
1985	Kapil Dev	Haryana
1986	Dilip Vengsarkar	Bombay
1987	Arun Lal	Bengal
1988	Arun Lal	Bengal
1989	Lalchand Rajput	
1990	Ravi Shastri	Bombay
1991	Syed Kirmani	Karnataka
1992	Woorkeri Raman	Tamil Nadu
1993	Sanjay Manjrekar	Bombay
1994	Pravin Amre	
1995	Nayan Mongia	Baroda
1996	Navjot Singh Sidhu	Punjab
1997	Anil Kumble	Karnataka
1998	VVS Laxman	Hyderabad
1999	Nayan Mongia	Baroda
2000	VVS Laxman	Hyderabad
2001	VVS Laxman	Hyderabad
2002	Yuvraj Singh	Punjab
2003	Saurav Ganguly	Bengal
2004	Dinesh Mongia	Punjab
2005	Gautam Gambhir	Delhi
2006	Wasim Jaffer	Mumbai
2007	Mohammad Kaif	Uttar Pradesh
2008	Anil Kumble	Karnataka
2009	Virender Sehwag	Delhi
2010	Yuvraj Singh	Punjab
2011	Parthiv Patel	Gujarat
2012	Cheteshwar Pujara	Saurashtra
2013	Virender Sehwag	Delhi
2014	Harbhajan Singh	Punjab
2015	Manoj Tiwary	Bengal
2016	Naman Ojha	Madhya Pradesh
2017	Cheteshwar Pujara	Saurashtra
2018	Karun Nair	Karnataka
2019	Ajinkya Rahane	Mumbai
2020	Hanuma Vihari	Andhra
2022	Mayank Agarwal	Karnataka
2023	Hanuma Vihari	Andhra
2024	Ruturaj Gaikwad	Maharashtra
2025	Rajat Patidar	Madhya Pradesh

== Current Team (for 2024–25 Irani Cup) ==
Name	Ranji Team
Ruturaj Gaikwad (c)	Maharashtra
Mayank Agarwal	Karnataka
Khaleel Ahmed	Rajasthan
Ricky Bhui	Andhra
Rahul Chahar	Rajasthan
Yash Dayal	Uttar Pradesh
Saransh Jain	Madhya Pradesh
Dhruv Jurel	Uttar Pradesh
Ishan Kishan	Jharkhand
Prasidh Krishna	Karnataka
Mukesh Kumar	Bengal
Devdutt Padikkal	Karnataka
Shashwat Rawat	Baroda
Sai Sudharsan	Tamil Nadu
Manav Suthar	Rajasthan

== Other forms ==
The Board of Control for Cricket in India has named other Rest of India teams. These have played tour matches against international teams, and in 1971–1972 played a series of 3 first-class matches against the Indian national cricket team to raise funds for defence forces. A List A "Best vs Best of the Rest" match was organized between Rest of India and the winner of 1989–90 Deodhar Trophy, West Zone, on 2 October 1989.

== See also ==
- Ranji Trophy
- Rest of England cricket teams aka The Rest (of England)
- Rest of Australia
