= 2009–10 Irani Cup =

Indian cricket match

The 2009–10 Irani Cup match was played 1–5 October 2009 at the Vidarbha Cricket Association Stadium in Nagpur. Rest of India faced the reigning Ranji Trophy champions Mumbai. The match was drawn and Rest of India won the Cup due to their first innings lead.

Rest of India fast bowler S. Sreesanth was fined 60 per cent of his match fees for using "abusive language" in an exchange with Mumbai player Dhawal Kulkarni. Sreesanth was also involved in a separate exchange of words with Ramesh Powar.

== Scorecard ==
1-5 October 2009
Scorecard

Rest of India	v	Mumbai
260 (76.3 overs); Ravindra Jadeja 77 (121); Ajit Agarkar 3/45 (17.3 overs)		230 (86.5 overs); Wasim Jaffer 68 (128); Munaf Patel 5/70 (22.5 overs)
352/4 (121 overs); Abhinav Mukund 126 (250); Iqbal Adbulla 2/78 (23 overs)

Match drawn
Vidarbha Cricket Association Stadium, Nagpur
Umpires: Amiesh Saheba and Shavir Tarapore

- Rest of India won the toss and elected to bat.
- No play was possible on Day 5 due to overnight rain.
- Rest of India won the Irani Cup due to their first innings lead.
