= 2006–07 Irani Cup =

Indian cricket match

The 2006–07 Irani Trophy match was played 9–11 October 2006 at the Vidarbha Cricket Association Ground in Nagpur. Rest of India defeated the reigning Ranji Trophy champions Uttar Pradesh defeated by 9 wickets.

== Scorecard ==
9 - 11 September 2006
Scorecard

Uttar Pradesh	v	Rest of India
148 (46 overs); Shivakant Shukla 52 (87); Lakshmipathy Balaji 4/29(14 overs)		201 (53.3 overs); Badrinath 80 (107); Shalabh Srivastava 5/74 (20.3 overs)
166 (50.1 overs); Jyoti Yadav 38 (77); Vikram Singh 4/40 (14.1 overs)		115/1 (22.3 overs); Gautam Gambhir 64* (64); Praveen Kumar 1/50 (11 overs)

Rest of India won by 9 wickets
Vidarbha Cricket Association Ground, Nagpur
Umpires: Shashank Ranade and Sudhir Asnani

- Uttar Pradesh won the toss and elected to field.
- Tanmay Srivastava (Uttar Pradesh) made his first-class debut.
