= 2008–09 Irani Cup =

Indian cricket match

The 2008–09 Irani Trophy match was played 24–28 September 2008 at the Reliance Stadium in Vadodra. Rest of India defeated the reigning Ranji Trophy champions Delhi defeated by 187 runs.

Delhi captain Virender Sehwag lodged a complaint with match referee Rajendrasinh Jadeja against Munaf Patel for using "abusive language" in an exchange of words with Aakash Chopra and Sehwag.

== Scorecard ==
24-27 September 2008
Scorecard

Rest of India	v	Delhi
252 (81.3 overs); Wasim Jaffer 46 (95); Ishant Sharma 3/22 (12.3 overs)		177 (57 overs); Virender Sehwag 43 (57); Munaf Patel 4/31 (9 overs)
302 (92.5 overs); MS Dhoni 84 (113); Chetanya Nanda 5/48 (26.5 overs)		190 (60.5 overs); Gautam Gambhir 91 (176); Harbhajan Singh 4/31 (14.5 overs)

Rest of India won by 187 runs
Reliance Stadium, Vadodara
Umpires: Sanjay Hazare and Shavir Tarapore

- Rest of India won the toss and elected to bat.
