= 2023–24 Irani Cup =

Domestic cricket tournament in India

Rest of India	Saurashtra
308	214
&	&
160	79
- Rest of India won by 175 runs
- Date: 1–5 October 2023
- Venue: Saurashtra Cricket Association Stadium, Rajkot
- Player of the match: Saurabh Kumar (Rest of India)
- Umpires: KN Ananthapadmanabhan and Jayaraman Madanagopal

The 2023–24 Irani Cup also known as IDFC First Bank Irani Cup due to sponsorship reason, was the sixtieth edition of the Irani Cup, a first-class cricket tournament in India, organised by Board of Control for Cricket in India (BCCI). It took place from 1 to 5 October 2023. It was played as a one-off match between Saurashtra, the winners of the 2022–23 Ranji Trophy, and a Rest of India cricket team.

The tournament was part of the 2023 Indian domestic cricket season, announced by the BCCI in April 2023. Rest of India were the defending champions, who won it by defeating Madhya Pradesh in the final.

Rest of India defeated Saurashtra by 175 runs to win their 31st title.

== Squads ==
Saurashtra	Rest of India
Jaydev Unadkat (c)	Hanuma Vihari (c)
Parth Bhut	Mayank Agarwal
Harvik Desai (wk)	Akash Deep
Yuvrajsinh Dodiya	K. S. Bharat (wk)
Sheldon Jackson (wk)	Yash Dhull
Dharmendrasinh Jadeja	Dhruv Jurel (wk)
Vishvaraj Jadeja	Vidwath Kaverappa
Chirag Jani	Sarfaraz Khan
Jay Gohil	Rohan Kunnummal
Devang Karamta	Shams Mulani
Prerak Mankad	Pulkit Narang
Snell Patel	Sai Sudharsan
Kushang Patel	Navdeep Saini
Cheteshwar Pujara	Saurabh Kumar
Arpit Vasavada	Yash Dayal
Samarth Vyas	

== Match ==
1–5 October 2023
Scorecard

Rest of India	v	Saurashtra
308 (94.2 overs); Sai Sudharsan 72 (164); Parth Bhut 5/94 (29.2 overs)		214 (83.2 overs); Arpit Vasavada 54 (127); Saurabh Kumar 4/65 (26.2 overs)
160 (52 overs); Mayank Agarwal 49 (93); Parth Bhut 7/53 (16 overs)		79 (34.3 overs); Dharmendrasinh Jadeja 21 (38); Saurabh Kumar 6/43 (16.3 overs)

Rest of India won by 175 runs
Saurashtra Cricket Association Stadium, Rajkot
Umpires: KN Ananthapadmanabhan and Jayaraman Madanagopal
Player of the match: Saurabh Kumar (Rest of India)

- Rest of India won the toss and elected to bat.

== Broadcasting ==
JioCinema platform aired it on internet and Sports18 Khel on TV live in India.
