= 1989–90 Irani Cup =

Indian cricket match

The 1989–90 Irani Cup match was played from 2–6 November 1989 at the Wankhede Stadium in Mumbai. The reigning Ranji Trophy champions Delhi defeated Rest of India by 309 runs.

== Scorecard ==
2-6 November 1989
Scorecard

Delhi	v	Rest of India
461 (160.3 overs); Bantoo Singh 136; Venkatapathy Raju 4/80 (53.1 overs)		290 (78.1 overs); Saba Karim 51; Maninder Singh 4/51 (25 overs)
383/8d (116 overs); Manu Nayyar 91; Venkatapathy Raju 3/93 (38 overs)		245 (64 overs); Sachin Tendulkar (103*); Sanjeev Sharma 4/45 (14 overs)

Delhi won by 309 runs
Wankhede Stadium, Bombay
Umpires: AL Narasimhan and Borni Jamula

- Delhi won the toss and elected to bat.
