= 1990–91 Irani Cup =

Indian cricket match

The 1990–91 Irani Cup was played from 1–5 November 1990 at the M. Chinnaswamy Stadium in Bangalore. The match between the Ranji Trophy champions Bengal and Rest of India was drawn. Rest of India won the Irani Cup through their first innings lead.

Rest of India's 757-7d was the highest score by a team until it was broken by Vidarbha's 800/7d in the 2017–18 Irani Cup. Pravin Amre's 246 was the highest individual score by a batsman until it was broken by Murali Vijay in the 2012–13 Irani Cup.

== Scorecard ==
1-5 November 1990
Scorecard

Rest of India	v	Bengal
737/7d (197.4 overs); Pravin Amre 246; Dattatreya Mukherjee 3/129 (40.1 overs)		262 (77.1 overs); Arun Lal 68; Venkatapathy Raju 4/57 (23.1 overs)
		373/8 (135 overs) (following on); Arun Lal 164; Vivek Razdan 2/62 (14 overs)

Match drawn
M. Chinnaswamy Stadium, Bangalore
Umpires: MR Singh and Nagaraja Rao

- Rest of India won the toss and elected to bat.
- Rest of India won the Irani Cup due to their first innings lead.
