= 1969–70 Irani Cup =

Indian cricket match

The 1969–70 Irani Cup match was played from 25 to 31 August 1969 at the Pune Club Ground in Poona. The match between the reigning Ranji Trophy champions Bombay and Rest of India was a draw. Bombay won the Irani Cup due to their first innings lead.

== Scorecard ==
25-31 August 1969
Scorecard

Bombay	v	Rest of India
236 (97.5 overs); Dilip Sardesai 53; Srinivas Venkataraghavan 7/43 (38 overs)		96 (42 overs); Srinivas Venkataraghavan 27; Ajit Pai 3/33 (14 overs)
137 (59.2 overs); Ajit Wadekar 69; Srinivas Venkataraghavan 4/32 (22.2 overs)		77/2 (45 overs); Surinder Amarnath 37; Padmakar Shivalkar 1/13 (14 overs)

Match drawn
Pune Club Ground, Poona
Umpires: Madhav Gothoskar and PR Karmarkar

- Bombay won the toss and elected to bat.
