= 2000–01 Irani Cup =

Indian cricket match

The 2000-01 Irani Cup match was played between 13 and 16 October 2000 at the Wankede Stadium in Mumbai. Rest of India defeated the reigning Ranji Trophy champions Mumbai by 10 wickets.

Murali Kartik's 9/70 in the third innings are the best bowling figures in the Irani Cup.

== Scorecard ==
13-16 October 2000
Scorecard

(H) Mumbai	v	Rest of India
260 (81.5 overs); Wasim Jaffer 56 (108); Sarandeep Singh 4/55 (17 overs)		389 (133.5 overs); VVS Laxman 167 (295); Santosh Saxena 3/72 (24 overs)
184 (62.1 overs); Wasim Jaffer 50 (84); Murali Kartik 9/70 (24 overs)		58/0 (7.5 overs); Shiv Sunder Das 34* (29)

Rest of India won by 10 wickets
Wankhede Stadium, Mumbai
Umpires: Arani Jayaprakash and Shyam Bansal

- Mumbai won the toss and elected to bat.
