= 1996–97 Irani Cup =

Indian cricket match

The 1996–97 Irani Trophy match was played 21-24 September 1996 at the M. Chinnaswamy Stadium in Bangalore, Karnataka. The reigning Ranji Trophy champions, Karnataka, defeated the Rest of India by 5 wickets.

== Scorecard ==
21-24 September 1996
Scorecard

Rest of India	v	(H) Karnataka
203 (72.5 overs); Pankaj Dharmani 84; Dodda Ganesh 6/84(20 overs)		356 (147.3 overs); Jagadeesh Arunkumar 93; Narendra Hirwani 6/129 (47.3 overs)
288 (93.3 overs); Pankaj Dharmani 72; Dodda Ganesh 5/89 (28 overs)		139/5 (60.4 overs); Somashekar Shiraguppi (62*); Narendra Hirwani 2/28 (21 overs)

Karnataka won by 5 wickets
M. Chinnaswamy Stadium, Bangalore
Umpires: Borni Jamula and Narendra Menon

- Rest of India won the toss and elected to bat.
