= 2010–11 Irani Cup =

Indian cricket match

The 2010–11 Irani Trophy match was played 1–5 October 2010 at the Sawai Mansingh Stadium in Jaipur. Rest of India defeated the reigning Ranji Trophy champions Mumbai defeated by 361 runs.

== Scorecard ==
1-5 October 2010
Scorecard

Rest of India	v	Mumbai
668 (165.5 overs); Abhinav Mukund 161 (304); Dhawal Kulkarni 5/148 (35.5 overs)		274 (87.4 overs); Wasim Jaffer 71 (171); Jaydev Unadkat 4/41 (15.4 overs)
387/3d (71 overs); Yuvraj Singh 204 (194); Ramesh Powar 2/75 (14 overs)		420 (117.1 overs); Ajinkya Rahane 191 (220); Ravichandran Ashwin 5/106 (38 overs)

Rest of India won by 361 runs
Sawai Mansingh Stadium, Jaipur
Umpires: Krishna Hariharan and Sundaram Ravi

- Rest of India won the toss and elected to bat.
