= 1978–79 Irani Cup =

Indian cricket match

The 1978–79 Irani Cup match was played from 15 to 18 September 1978 at the M. Chinnaswamy Stadium in Bangalore. Rest of India defeated the reigning Ranji Trophy champions Karnataka by 9 wickets.

== Scorecard ==
15 to 18 September 1978
Scorecard

(H) Karnataka	v	Rest of India
202 (74.5 overs); Sudhakar Rao 56; Dhiraj Parsana 4/63 (20.3 overs)		464/8d (136 overs); Dilip Vengsarkar 151; Bhagwath Chandrasekhar 4/134 (41 overs)
354 (110 overs); Gundappa Viswanath 110; Dhiraj Parsana 5/127 (52 overs)		93/1 (28.1 overs); Anshuman Gaekwad 33*

Rest of India won by 9 wickets.
M. Chinnaswamy Stadium, Bangalore
Umpires: Ram Punjabi and Swaroop Kishen

- Karnataka won the toss and elected to bat.
