= 1966–67 Irani Cup =

Indian cricket match

The 1966–67 Irani Cup match was played 24–28 November 1966 at the Eden Gardens in Calcutta. Rest of India defeated the reigning Ranji Trophy champions Bombay by 6 wickets.

== Scorecard ==
24-28 November 1966
Scorecard

Bombay	v	Rest of India
113 (54.1 overs); Ajit Wadekar 56; Erapalli Prasanna 4/27 (17.1 overs)		134 (80.4 overs); Ambar Roy 50; Padmakar Shivalkar 3/28 (25.4 overs)
99 (39.1 overs); Ajit Wadekar 27; Erapalli Prasanna 4/31 (17.1 overs)		81/4 (32.5 overs); Chandu Borde (33*); Padmakar Shivalkar 1/21 (9.5 overs)

Rest of India won by 6 wickets
Eden Gardens, Calcutta
Umpires: Samar Roy and Sambhu Pan

- Rest of India won the toss and elected to field.
- No play was possible on Day 1 due to rain.
