= 2001–02 Irani Cup =

Indian cricket match

The 2001–02 Irani Cup match was played between 13 and 17 October 2001 at the Vidarbha Cricket Association Ground in Nagpur. Rest of India defeated the reigning Ranji Trophy champions Baroda defeated by 6 wickets.

== Scorecard ==
13-17 October 2001
Scorecard

| Baroda | v | Rest of India |
| 318 (107.2 overs); Connor Williams 143 (324); Sarandeep Singh 5/78 (35.1 overs) | | 331 (117.3 overs); Dinesh Mongia 125 (247); Valmik Buch 5/94 (34.3 overs) |
| 285 (105.4 overs); Connor Williams 83 (122); Sarandeep Singh 3/75 (36 overs) | | 273/4 (77.2 overs); VVS Laxman 148 (198); Irfan Pathan 1/15 (5 overs) |

Rest of India won by 6 wickets.
Vidarbha Cricket Association Ground, Nagpur
Umpires: Suhas Phadkar and V. K. Ramaswamy

- Rest of India won the toss and elected to field.
