= 1999–2000 Irani Cup =

Indian cricket match

The 1999–2000 Irani Cup match was played 30 September - 3 October 1999 at the M. Chinnaswamy Stadium in Bangalore. Rest of India defeated the reigning Ranji Trophy champions Karnataka by an innings and 60 runs.

== Scorecard ==
30 September - 3 October 1999
Scorecard

(H) Karnataka	v	Rest of India
170 (79.3 overs); Somashekar Shiraguppi 42 (107); Reetinder Sodhi 4/33 (19.3 overs)		321 (130.3 overs); Sitanshu Kotak 118 (302); Javagal Srinath 6/77 (34.3 overs)
91 (33.5 overs); Javagal Srinath 27 (45); Thirunavukkarasu Kumaran 6/39 (14.5 overs)

Rest of India won by an innings and 60 runs
M. Chinnaswamy Stadium, Bangalore
Umpires: SK Sharma and VM Gupte

- Rest of India won the toss and elected to field first
- Play started late at 14:00 IST on Day 1 (30 September) due to overnight rain. Pay started 20 minutes late on Day 3 (October 2) due to overnight rain.
