= 1988–89 Irani Cup =

Indian cricket match

The 1988–89 Irani Cup was played from 30 September - 4 October 1988 at the M. A. Chidambaram Stadium in Madras. The reigning Ranji Trophy champions Tamil Nadu defeated Rest of India by 3 wickets.

== Scorecard ==
30 September - 4 October 1988
Scorecard

Rest of India	v	Tamil Nadu
433 (156.2 overs); Shrikant Kalyani 93; Santhanaraman Vasudevan 5/116 (47 overs)		226 (87.3 overs); Krishnamachari Srikkanth 57; Gopal Sharma 6/69 (32 overs)
132 (49.2 overs); Sadanand Viswanath 32; Santhanaraman Vasudevan 4/42 (17 overs)		345/7 (79.3 overs); V. B. Chandrasekhar 119; Gopal Sharma 6/135 (33.3 overs)

Tamil Nadu won by 3 wickets
M. A. Chidambaram Stadium, Madras
Umpires: Piloo Reporter and Ram Gupta

- Rest of India won the toss and elected to bat.
- October 2 was a rest day.
