= 1987–88 Irani Cup =

Indian cricket match

The 1987–88 Irani Cup was played from 30 October - 4 November 1987 at the Gymkhana Ground in Secundrabad. The reigning Ranji Trophy champions Hyderabad drew with Rest of India and were awarded the Irani Cup through their first innings lead.

== Scorecard ==
30 October - 4 November 1987
Scorecard

Hyderabad	v	Rest of India
405 (110.4 overs); Khlid Qayyum 106; Rajinder Singh Ghai 5/117 (26 overs)		378 (116.4 overs); Sanjay Manjrekar 59; Arshad Ayub 6/105 (41 overs)
256/6 (82.2 overs); Vivek Jaisimha 92*; Narendra Hirwani 2/41 (13 overs)

Match drawn
Gymkhana Ground, Secunderabad
Umpires: Subrata Banerjee and VD Gupte

- Hyderabad won the toss and elected to bat.
- November 1 was a rest day. No play was possible on Day 5 (November 3) due to rain.
- Hyderabad won the Irani Cup through their first innings lead.
