= 1962–63 Irani Cup =

Annual Indian cricket fixture

Rest of India	Bombay
397	566/5d
&
219/6
- Match drawn; Bombay won the match by 1st innings lead
- Date: 5–8 April 1963
- Venue: Brabourne Stadium, Bombay
- Umpires: Habib Choudhury and Judah Reuben

The 1962–63 Irani Cup, was the 2nd edition of the Irani Cup, a first-class cricket competition in India. It was played as a one-off match between Bombay, the winners of the 1961–62 Ranji Trophy, and Rest of India, from 5 to 8 April 1963.

== Squads ==
Bombay	Rest of India
Polly Umrigar (c); Farokh Engineer (wk); Sudhakar Adhikari; Vasoo Paranjape; Bapu Nadkarni; Hoshang Amroliwala; Ajit Wadekar; Gulabrai Ramchand; Sharad Diwadkar; Ramakant Desai; Baloo Gupte	Pankaj Roy (c); Budhi Kunderan (wk); Motganhalli Jaisimha; Vijay Mehra; Abbas Ali Baig; Vijay Manjrekar; Hanumant Singh; Madhukar Gupte; Sharad Gupte; K. S. Ramachandran; Hejmadi Bhaskar Rao

== Match ==
5 – 8 April 1963
Scorecard

Rest of India	v	Bombay
397 (166 overs); Pankaj Roy 132; Bapu Nadkarni 4/36 (43 overs)		566/5d (134 overs); Sudhakar Adhikari 173; Sharad Gupte 2/80 (21 overs)
219/6 (62 overs); Abbas Ali Baig 47; Sharad Diwadkar 3/50 (22 overs)

Match drawn
Brabourne Stadium, Bombay
Umpires: Habib Choudhury and Judah Reuben

- Bombay won the toss and elected to field.
- Bombay won the match by virtue of the lead in 1st innings
