= 2005–06 Irani Cup =

Indian cricket series edition

The 2005–06 Irani Trophy match was played 1–4 October 2005 at the Karnail Singh Stadium in Delhi. The reigning Ranji Trophy champions, Railways, defeated the Rest of India by 9 wickets. Rest of India captain Gautam Gambhir won the toss and decided to bat first. They were dismissed for 223 and Railways responded with 311 all out. In their second innings, the Rest scored only 137 to leave Railways with a target of 50 to win. They lost only one wicket and the match, scheduled for five days, ended before lunch on the fourth day. Top scorer in the match was Murali Kartik of Railways with a first innings of 96. The best bowling figures were by Ramesh Powar of the Rest who took 7/116 in the same innings.

There was a controversial incident in the Railways first innings when umpire Ravi Subramanian suspended bowler Shanthakumaran Sreesanth for repeatedly running on the Protected Area of the pitch. He had bowled the first two balls of his current over and the remainder were bowled by Ranadeb Bose.

== Scorecard ==
1-4 October 2005
Scorecard

| Rest of India | v | (H) Railways |
| 223 (82 overs); Dheeraj Jadhav 53 (140); Kulamani Parida 4/61 (20 overs) | | 311 (125.5 overs); Murali Kartik 96 (163); Ramesh Powar 7/116 (42.5 overs) |
| 137 (57.3 overs); Dheeraj Jadhav 42 (108); Murali Kartik 3/28 (13.3 overs) | | 50/1 (15.2 overs); Amit Pagnis 33 (43) |

Railways won by 9 wickets
Karnail Singh Stadium, Delhi
Umpires: Francis Gomes and Ravi Subramanian

- Rest of India won the toss and elected to bat.
