= 1992–93 Irani Cup =

Indian cricket match

The 1991–92 Irani Cup was played from 26 to 29 September 1992 at the Feroz Shah Kotla Stadium in Delhi. Rest of India defeated the reigning Ranji Trophy champions Delhi by an innings and 122 runs.

Anil Kumble's 13/138 are the best bowling figures in a match in the Irani Cup.

== Scorecard ==
26-29 September 1992
Scorecard

Rest of India	v	Delhi
638 (146.1 overs); Woorkeri Raman 184; Kirti Azad 3/26 (8 overs)		229 (80 overs); Raman Lamba 89; Anil Kumble 7/64 (21 overs)
		287 (93 overs) following on Bantoo Singh 69; Anil Kumble 6/74 (35 overs)

Rest of India won by an innings and 122 runs
Feroz Shah Kotla, Delhi
Umpires: Piloo Reporter and V. K. Ramaswamy

- Delhi won the toss and elected to field.
