= 2007–08 Irani Cup =

Indian cricket match

The 2007–08 Irani Trophy match was played 6–9 October 2007 at the Madhavrao Scindia Cricket Ground in Rajkot. Rest of India defeated the reigning Ranji Trophy champions Mumbai defeated by 9 wickets.

== Scorecard ==
6-9 October 2007
Scorecard

Mumbai	v	Rest of India
453 (101.2 overs); Abhishek Nayar 118 (108); Ishant Sharma 3/63 (22 overs)		472 (119.3 overs); Parthiv Patel 179 (235); Rajesh Verma 5/97 (30 overs)
106 (33.3 overs); Ajinkya Rahane 27 (37); Munaf Patel 5/25 (7.3 overs)		91/1 (18.5 overs); Parthiv Patel 59* (48); Iqbal Adbulla 1/18 (6 overs)

Rest of India won by 9 wickets
Madhavrao Scindia Cricket Ground, Rajkot
Umpires: Krishna Hariharan and Shavir Tarapore

- Mumbai won the toss and elected to bat.
