= 2011–12 Irani Cup =

Indian cricket match

The 2011–12 Irani Trophy match was played 1–5 October 2011 at the Sawai Mansingh Stadium in Jaipur. Rest of India defeated the reigning Ranji Trophy champions Rajasthan defeated by 404 runs.

== Scorecard ==
1-5 October 2011
Scorecard

Rest of India	v	Rajasthan
663 (153.4 overs); Shikhar Dhawan 177 (165); Aniket Choudhary 4/125 (34 overs)		400 (134.3 overs); Robin Bist 93 (228); Pragyan Ojha 5/86 (27.3 overs)
354/2d (54 overs); Shikhar Dhawan 155 (126); Ashok Menaria 1/15 (4 overs)		213 (73.2 overs); Madhur Khatri 53 (98); Pragyan Ojha 4/60 (22.2 overs)

Rest of India won by 404 runs
Sawai Mansingh Stadium, Jaipur
Umpires: Chettithody Shamshuddin and Krishna Hariharan
Player of the match: Shikhar Dhawan

- Rest of India won the toss and elected to bat.
- Aniket Choudhary (Rajasthan) made his first-class debut.
