= 2003–04 Irani Cup =

Indian cricket match

The 2003–04 Irani Trophy match was played from 18 to 21 September 2003 at the M. A. Chidambaram Stadium in Chennai. Rest of India defeated the reigning Ranji Trophy champions Mumbai defeated by 3 wickets.

== Scorecard ==
18 - 21 September 2003
Scorecard

Mumbai	v	Rest of India
297 (97.2 overs); Sachin Tendulkar 94 (197); Zaheer Khan 5/77 (24 overs)		202 (73.2 overs); Rahul Dravid 41 (69); Ramesh Powar 4/61 (23 overs)
244 (74 overs); Ramesh Powar 57 (109); Harbhajan Singh 4/79 (25 overs)		340/7 (100.4 overs); Rahul Dravid 121 (251); Sairaj Bahutule 3/61 (24 overs)

Rest of India won by 3 wickets
M. A. Chidambaram Stadium, Chennai
Umpires: Jasbir Singh and Vijay Chopra
Player of the match: Rahul Dravid

- Rest of India won the toss and elected to field.
