= New Zealand cricket team in India in 2017–18 =

International cricket tour

	India	New Zealand
- Dates: 22 October – 7 November 2017
Captains	Virat Kohli	Kane Williamson

One Day International series
- Results: India won the 3-match series 2–1
Most runs	Virat Kohli (263)	Tom Latham (206)
Most wickets	Jasprit Bumrah (6)	Tim Southee (6)
- Player of the series: Virat Kohli (Ind)

Twenty20 International series
- Results: India won the 3-match series 2–1
Most runs	Virat Kohli (104)	Colin Munro (123)
Most wickets	Jasprit Bumrah (3); Yuzvendra Chahal (3)	Trent Boult (6)
- Player of the series: Jasprit Bumrah (Ind)

The New Zealand cricket team toured India in October and November 2017 to play three One Day Internationals (ODIs) and three Twenty20 International (T20I) matches. The fixtures replaced the planned visit to India by Pakistan that was listed on the Future Tours Programme. The Board of Control for Cricket in India (BCCI) confirmed the full dates in September 2017. On 25 September 2017, New Zealand named the first nine players for the ODI squad. The remaining players for New Zealand's ODI and T20I squads were named on 14 October 2017.

Ahead of the second ODI, footage emerged of groundsman Pandurang Salgaonkar allegedly agreeing to tamper with the wicket. He was later suspended by the Maharashtra Cricket Association, with the match going ahead as scheduled.

India won the ODI series 2–1 and the T20I series 2–1.

== Squads ==
ODIs		T20Is	
India	New Zealand	India	New Zealand
Virat Kohli (c); Rohit Sharma (vc); Jasprit Bumrah; Yuzvendra Chahal; Shikhar Dhawan; MS Dhoni (wk); Kedar Jadhav; Dinesh Karthik; Bhuvneshwar Kumar; Manish Pandey; Hardik Pandya; Axar Patel; Ajinkya Rahane; Shardul Thakur; Kuldeep Yadav	Kane Williamson (c); ~~Todd Astle~~; Trent Boult; Colin de Grandhomme; Martin Guptill; Matt Henry; Tom Latham (wk); Henry Nicholls; Adam Milne; Colin Munro; Glenn Phillips; Mitchell Santner; Ish Sodhi; Tim Southee; Ross Taylor; George Worker	Virat Kohli (c); Jasprit Bumrah; Yuzvendra Chahal; Shikhar Dhawan; MS Dhoni (wk); Shreyas Iyer; Dinesh Karthik; Bhuvneshwar Kumar; Ashish Nehra; Manish Pandey; Hardik Pandya; Axar Patel; KL Rahul; Rohit Sharma; Mohammed Siraj; Kuldeep Yadav	Kane Williamson (c); ~~Todd Astle~~; Trent Boult; Tom Bruce; Colin de Grandhomme; Martin Guptill; Matt Henry; Tom Latham (wk); Henry Nicholls; Adam Milne; Colin Munro; Glenn Phillips; Mitchell Santner; Ish Sodhi; Tim Southee; Ross Taylor

Ahead of the tour, Todd Astle was ruled out of both New Zealand's ODI and T20I squads. Ish Sodhi replaced him in the ODI squad and Ross Taylor replaced him in the T20I squad.

== Tour matches ==
=== 1st One-day: India Board President XI vs New Zealand ===
17 October 2017
Scorecard

India Board President XI; 295/9 (50 overs)	v	New Zealand; 265 (47.4 overs)
Karun Nair 78 (64); Trent Boult 5/38 (9 overs)		Tom Latham 59 (63); Shahbaz Nadeem 3/41 (10 overs)

Indian Board President's XI won by 30 runs
Brabourne Stadium, Mumbai
Umpires: Rohan Pandit (Ind) and Krishnamachari Srinivasan (Ind)

- New Zealand won the toss and elected to field.
- 13 players per side (11 batting, 11 fielding).

=== 2nd One-day: India Board President XI vs New Zealand ===
19 October 2017
Scorecard

New Zealand; 343/8 (50 overs)	v	India Board President XI; 310 (47.1 overs)
Tom Latham 108 (87); Jaydev Unadkat 3/57 (10 overs)		Gurkeerat Singh 65 (46); Mitchell Santner 3/44 (7.1 overs)

New Zealand won by 33 runs
Brabourne Stadium, Mumbai
Umpires: Rohan Pandit (Ind) and Krishnamachari Srinivasan (Ind)

- New Zealand won the toss and elected to bat.
- 15 players per side (11 batting, 11 fielding).

== ODI Series ==
=== 1st ODI ===
22 October 2017
13:30 (D/N)
Scorecard

India; 280/8 (50 overs)	v	New Zealand; 284/4 (49 overs)
Virat Kohli 121 (125); Trent Boult 4/35 (10 overs)		Tom Latham 103* (102); Hardik Pandya 1/46 (10 overs)

New Zealand won by 6 wickets
Wankhede Stadium, Mumbai
Umpires: Michael Gough (Eng) and C. K. Nandan (Ind)
Player of the match: Tom Latham (NZ)

- India won the toss and elected to bat.
- Virat Kohli (Ind) played in his 200th ODI. He became the second player to score a century in his 200th ODI and moved to second on the list of most centuries in ODIs (31).
- Tom Latham and Ross Taylor (NZ) scored the highest partnership for a visiting team while batting second in an ODI in India (200).

=== 2nd ODI ===
25 October 2017
13:30 (D/N)
Scorecard

New Zealand; 230/9 (50 overs)	v	India; 232/4 (46 overs)
Henry Nicholls 42 (62); Bhuvneshwar Kumar 3/45 (10 overs)		Shikhar Dhawan 68 (84); Adam Milne 1/21 (8 overs)

India won by 6 wickets
Maharashtra Cricket Association Stadium, Pune
Umpires: Chettithody Shamshuddin (Ind) and Rod Tucker (Aus)
Player of the match: Bhuvneshwar Kumar (Ind)

- New Zealand won the toss and elected to bat.

=== 3rd ODI ===
29 October 2017
13:30 (D/N)
Scorecard

India; 337/6 (50 overs)	v	New Zealand; 331/7 (50 overs)
Rohit Sharma 147 (138); Mitchell Santner 2/58 (10 overs)		Colin Munro 75 (62); Jasprit Bumrah 3/47 (10 overs)

India won by 6 runs
Green Park, Kanpur
Umpires: Anil Chaudhary (Ind) and Michael Gough (Eng)
Player of the match: Rohit Sharma (Ind)

- New Zealand won the toss and elected to field.
- Virat Kohli (Ind) became the fastest batsman, in terms of innings played, to make 9,000 runs in ODIs (194).
- Rohit Sharma and Virat Kohli (Ind) recorded their fourth double-century partnership in ODIs, the most by any pair.

== T20I series ==
=== 1st T20I ===
1 November 2017
19:00 (N)
Scorecard

India; 202/3 (20 overs)	v	New Zealand; 149/8 (20 overs)
Shikhar Dhawan 80 (52); Ish Sodhi 2/25 (4 overs)		Tom Latham 39 (36); Axar Patel 2/20 (4 overs)

India won by 53 runs
Feroz Shah Kotla Ground, Delhi
Umpires: Nitin Menon (Ind) and Chettithody Shamshuddin (Ind)
Player of the match: Shikhar Dhawan (Ind)

- New Zealand won the toss and elected to field.
- Shreyas Iyer (Ind) made his T20I debut.
- Ashish Nehra (Ind) played in his final international match.
- Rohit Sharma and Shikhar Dhawan recorded the highest ever partnership for India in T20Is (158).
- This was India's first win against New Zealand in T20Is.

=== 2nd T20I ===
4 November 2017
19:00 (N)
Scorecard

New Zealand; 196/2 (20 overs)	v	India; 156/7 (20 overs)
Colin Munro 109* (58); Yuzvendra Chahal 1/36 (4 overs)		Virat Kohli 65 (42); Trent Boult 4/34 (4 overs)

New Zealand won by 40 runs
Saurashtra Cricket Association Stadium, Rajkot
Umpires: Anil Chaudhary (Ind) and C. K. Nandan (Ind)
Player of the match: Colin Munro (NZ)

- New Zealand won the toss and elected to bat.
- Mohammed Siraj (Ind) made his T20I debut.
- Colin Munro (NZ) became the fourth batsman, and second for New Zealand, to score two centuries in T20Is.
- Virat Kohli became the first Indian batsman to score 7,000 runs in T20s.

=== 3rd T20I ===
7 November 2017
19:00 (N)
Scorecard

India; 67/5 (8 overs)	v	New Zealand; 61/6 (8 overs)
Manish Pandey 17 (11); Tim Southee 2/13 (2 overs)		Colin de Grandhomme 17* (10); Jasprit Bumrah 2/9 (2 overs)

India won by 6 runs
Greenfield International Stadium, Thiruvananthapuram
Umpires: Anil Chaudhary (Ind) and Nitin Menon (Ind)
Player of the match: Jasprit Bumrah (Ind)

- New Zealand won the toss and elected to field.
- The match was reduced to 8 overs per side due to rain.
- It was the first T20I to be played at this venue and the 50th venue in India to host an international cricket match.
