= 1963–64 Irani Cup =

Annual Indian cricket fixture

Bombay	Rest of India
204	83
&	&
145	157
- Bombay won by 109 runs
- Date: 27–29 March 1964
- Venue: Neelam Sanjiva Reddy Stadium, Anantapur
- Umpires: Mohammad Yunus and V. Rajagopal

The 1963–64 Irani Cup, was the 3rd edition of the Irani Cup, a first-class cricket competition in India. It was played as a one-off match between Bombay, the winners of the 1962–63 Ranji Trophy, and Rest of India, from 27 to 29 March 1964.

== Squads ==
Bombay	Rest of India
Bapu Nadkarni (c); Chandrakant Patankar (wk); Sudhakar Adhikari; Dilip Sardesai; Ajit Wadekar; Vasudeo Paranjape; Sharad Diwadkar; Ashok Mankad; Arun Varde; Ramakant Desai; Baloo Gupte	Chandu Borde (c); Budhi Kunderan (wk); Sangramsinh Gaekwad; Prakash Poddar; Hanumant Singh; Motganhalli Jaisimha; Vijay Bhosle; Venkataraman Subramanya; Rusi Surti; Bhagwath Chandrasekhar; Habib Khan

== Match ==
27–29 March 1964
Scorecard

Bombay	v	Rest of India
204 (67 overs); Bapu Nadkarni 60; Chandu Borde 3/27 (17 overs)		83 (37.1 overs); Sangramsinh Gaekwad 21; Bapu Nadkarni 5/11 (14.1 overs)
145 (51.1 overs); Ashok Mankad 29; Bhagwath Chandrasekhar 7/41 (19.1 overs)		157 (72.5 overs); Vijay Bhosle 59; Baloo Gupte 8/48 (23.5 overs)

Bombay won by 109 runs
Neelam Sanjiva Reddy Stadium, Anantapur
Umpires: Mohammad Yunus and V. Rajagopal

- Bombay won the toss and elected to bat.
