= Pravin Amre =

Indian cricketer (born 1968)

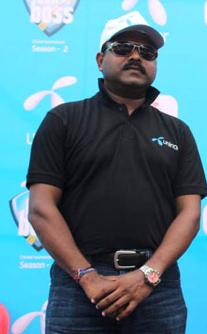
- Pravin Amre at Box Cricket Finale, Box Ka Boss

Personal information
- Full name: Pravin Kalyan Amre
- Born: 14 August 1968 (age 58); Mumbai, Maharashtra, India
- Batting: Right-handed
- Bowling: Right-arm Leg break
- Role: Batsman

International information
- National side: India (1991-1994)
- Test debut (cap 195): 13 November 1992 v South Africa
- Last Test: 4 August 1993 v Sri Lanka
- ODI debut (cap 82): 10 November 1991 v South Africa
- Last ODI: 20 February 1994 v Sri Lanka

Domestic team information
- Years: Team
- Air India
- Bengal cricket team
- Boland cricket team
- Goa cricket team
- Mumbai cricket team
- Railways cricket team
- Rajasthan cricket team
- Seattle Orcas cricket team

Career statistics
Competition	Test	ODI	FC	LA
Matches	11	37	86	113
Runs scored	425	513	5,815	2,382
Batting average	42.50	20.52	48.86	27.37
100s/50s	1/3	0/2	17/25	1/14
Top score	103	84*	246	103*
Balls bowled	–	2	30	26
Wickets	–	0	0	0
Bowling average	–	–	–	–
5 wickets in innings	–	–	–	–
10 wickets in match	–	–	–	–
Best bowling	–	–	–	–
Catches/stumpings	9/–	12/0	58/0	32/–
- Source: CricInfo, 17 February 2018

Pravin Kalyan Amre (born 14 August 1968) is an Indian cricketer who represented the Indian cricket team between 1991 and 1999. He played 11 Test matches and 37 One Day Internationals (ODIs).

== Domestic career ==
Amre was coached by Ramakant Achrekar, who was also the coach of Sachin Tendulkar and Vinod Kambli. Achrekar once famously claimed that he would be a better batsman than even Sachin. At the domestic level, Amre played for various teams such as Mumbai, Railways, Rajasthan and Bengal, while also playing in South Africa for Boland. His score of 246 for Rest of India against Bengal in the 1990–91 Irani Cup was the highest individual score by a batsman until Murali Vijay broke it in the 2012–13 Irani Cup.

== International career ==
Amre made his One Day International (ODI) debut against South Africa at Kolkata on 10 November 1991, scoring a 55 off 74 balls. His Test debut came against the same team at Durban, scoring a century which was incidentally his highest score in tests. In the event, he became the ninth India player to achieve this feat. Pravin Amre's highest ODI score also came against South Africa when he scored an unbeaten 84 from 98 balls to lead India to victory in the 7th one day of the 1992 ODI series.

== After cricket ==
He was the coach of the India Under-19 Cricket Team, which won the 2012 Under-19 Cricket World Cup in Australia and Mumbai cricket team. He was the assistant coach of Pune Warriors India in the Indian Premier League. He was the talent scout for the Delhi Capitals in the IPL.

In July 2019, he was appointed as the batting coach of the United States National Cricket Team on a short-term basis.

In January 2021, he was appointed as the assistant coach of the Delhi Capitals.

In July 2023, he was the head coach for Seattle Orcas in the inaugural season of Major League Cricket in the USA.
