= 1981–82 Irani Cup =

Indian cricket match

The 1981–82 Irani Cup match was scheduled to be played between 15 and 18 October 1981 at the Nehru Stadium, Indore between Rest of India and the reigning Ranji Trophy champions Bombay. The match was drawn and Bombay won the Irani Cup due to their first innings lead.

Ravi Shastri's 9/101 was best bowling figures in an innings in the Irani Cup.

== Scorecard ==
15-18 October 1981
Scorecard

Bombay	v	Rest of India
445 (150.2 overs); Sandeep Patil 125; Dilip Doshi 4/101 (49 overs)		261 (104 overs); Madan Lal 97*; Ravi Shastri 9/101 (45 overs)
216/4d (72 overs); Sunil Gavaskar 102*; Kapil Dev 2/30 (13 overs)		210/5 (64 overs); Surinder Amarnath 66; Ravi Shastri 2/46 (15 overs)

Match drawn
Nehru Stadium, Indore
Umpires: Rajan Mehra and Sukha Bose

- Bombay won the toss and elected to bat first.
- Bombay won the Irani Cup due to their first innings lead.
