= 1980–81 Irani Cup =

Indian cricket match

The 1980–81 Irani Cup match was scheduled to be played between 22 and 25 October 1980 at the Feroz Shah Kotla in Delhi between Rest of India and the reigning Ranji Trophy champions Delhi. The match was drawn and Delhi won the Irani Cup due to their first innings lead.

== Scorecard ==
22-25 October 1980
Scorecard

Rest of India	v	(H) Delhi
507/9d (123 overs); Gundappa Viswanath 98; Sunil Valson 4/118 (25 overs)		628/8d (181.2 overs); Surinder Amarnath 235*; Kapil Dev 3/99 (28 overs)
232/5d (51 overs); Tirumalai Srinivasan 101; Rakesh Shukla 2/58 (15 overs)		12/1 (11 overs); Chetan Chauhan 6* Kapil Dev 1/0 (4 overs)

Match drawn
Feroz Shah Kotla, Delhi
Umpires: Kasturi Ramaswami and Madhav Gothoskar

- Rest of India won the toss and elected to bat first.
- Delhi won the Irani Cup due to their first innings lead.
