= 1984–85 Irani Cup =

Indian cricket match

The 1984–85 Irani Cup match was scheduled to be played between 6-10 September 1984 at the Feroz Shah Kotla in Delhi. Rest of India defeated the reigning Ranji Trophy champions Bombay by 4 wickets.

== Scorecard ==
6-10 September 1984
Scorecard

Bombay	v	Rest of India
236 (95.4 overs); Ravi Shastri 58; Chetan Sharma 3/48 (17.4 overs)		293 (88.2 overs); Kapil Dev 48; Balwinder Sandhu 3/75 (18 overs)
163 (63.4 overs); Ghulam Parkar 55; Maninder Singh 4/34 (22 overs)		107/6 (30.5 overs); Mohammad Azharuddin 51*; Balwinder Sandhu 4/41 (13 overs)

Rest of India won by 4 wickets
Feroz Shah Kotla, Delhi
Umpires: Padmakar Pandit and V. K. Ramaswamy

- Rest of India won the toss and elected to field.
- 9 September was a rest day.
