= 1995–96 Irani Cup =

Indian cricket match

The 1995–96 Irani Cup was played from 1–3 October 1995 at the Wankhede Stadium in Bombay. The reigning Ranji Trophy champions Bombay defeated Rest of India by 9 wickets and retained the Irani Cup.

== Scorecard ==
1-3 October 1995
Scorecard

Rest of India	v	Bombay
99 (41.1 overs); Nayan Mongia 23; Paras Mhambrey 5/20 (10.1 overs)		266 (79.3 overs); Vinod Kambli 112; Venkatesh Prasad 4/75 (20.3 overs)
186 (78.5 overs); Surendra Bhave 44; Paras Mhambrey 3/35 (17 overs)		20/1 (6.4 overs); Sanjay Manjrekar 12*; Obaid Kamal 1/13 (3 overs)

Bombay won by 9 wickets
Wankhede Stadium, Bombay
Umpires: Srinivas Venkataraghavan and V. K. Ramaswamy

- Rest of India won the toss and elected to bat.
