= Pune Club Ground =

1935 established cricket ground in Pune

Coordinates: 18.52336°N 73.87933°E

- Location: Pune, Maharashtra
- Establishment: 1935
- Capacity: n/a
- Owner: Pune Club
- Architect: n/a
- Operator: Pune Club
- Tenants: • Maharashtra cricket team • Board of Control for Cricket in India
- End names
- n/a
- As of 2 March 2023; Source: Cricinfo

The Pune Club Ground or Poona Club Ground is a cricket ground in Pune, Maharashtra. It has been used for first-class cricket since 1935, most recently for a Ranji Trophy match between Maharashtra and Railways in 2001.

One of only ten first-class quadruple centuries was scored at the ground by B. B. Nimbalkar in December 1948. He reached 443* playing for Maharashtra in a Ranji Trophy match against Kathiawar. It is the only first-class score of 400 or more by a cricketer who was never selected to play Test cricket.

In 1970, Bombay versus Rest of India cricket team Irani Cup match was held on this ground. In it the earlier defeated the latter.

The opposing captain, the Thakore Saheb of Rajkot, conceded the match when Nimbalkar was nine short of Don Bradman's then world-record score of 452*.
