= 2004–05 Irani Cup =

Indian cricket match

The 2004–05 Irani Trophy match was played 22–25 September 2005 at the Punjab Cricket Association Stadium in Mohali. Rest of India defeated the reigning Ranji Trophy champions Mumbai defeated by 290 runs.

== Scorecard ==
22 - 25 September 2005
Scorecard

Rest of India	v	Mumbai
314 (99.4 overs); Sridharan Sriram 77 (196); Robin Morris 6/69(19.4 overs)		198 (52.2 overs); Ramesh Powar 55 (86); Shib Paul 3/43 (14 overs)
378 (114 overs); Venugopal Rao 113 (205); Sairaj Bahutule 3/92 (36 overs)		204 (68 overs); Vinayak Mane 41 (72); Joginder Sharma 3/40 (12 overs)

Rest of India won by 290 runs
Punjab Cricket Association Stadium, Mohali
Umpires: Arani Jayaprakash and Ivaturi Shivram

- Mumbai won the toss and elected to field.
