= 1983–84 Irani Cup =

Indian cricket match

The 1983–84 Irani Cup match was scheduled to be played between 31 August - 3 September 1983 at the Madhavrao Scindia Cricket Ground in Rajkot. The match between Rest of India and the reigning Ranji Trophy champions Karnataka was a draw. Karnataka won the Irani Cup due to their first innings lead.

== Scorecard ==
31 August - 3 September 1983
Scorecard

Karnataka	v	Rest of India
350 (115.4 overs); Madapusi Srinivasaprasad 117; Sunil Valson 3/50 (14 overs)		185 (78.1 overs); Yashpal Sharma 76; Bharamiah Vijayakrishna 5/63 (29.1 overs)
405/9d (122.2 overs); Roger Binny 158; Ravi Shastri 4/101 (22.2 overs)		186/3 (57 overs); Mohinder Amarnath 66*; Raghuram Bhat 2/63 (23 overs)

Match drawn
Madhavrao Scindia Cricket Ground, Rajkot
Umpires: Bhairab Ganguli and Madhav Gothoskar

- Rest of India won the toss and elected to field.
- Karnataka won the Irani Cup due to their first innings lead.
