= 1998–99 Irani Cup =

Indian cricket match

The 1998–99 Irani Cup match was played 30 September - 4 October 1998 at the M. Chinnaswamy Stadium in Bangalore. The match between the reigning Ranji Trophy champions Karnataka and Rest of India was a draw. Karnataka won the Irani Cup due to their first innings lead.

== Scorecard ==
30 September - 4 October 1998
Scorecard

(H) Karnataka	v	Rest of India
326 (141.5 overs); Sujith Somasunder 143; Nikhil Chopra 4/87 (48 overs)		221 (111.5 overs); Nikhil Chopra 54; Sunil Joshi 5/57 (41.5 overs)
304/6d (117 overs); Vijay Bharadwaj 87; Nikhil Chopra 3/87 (32 overs)		164/1 (46 overs); VVS Laxman (93); Sunil Joshi 1/27 (12 overs)

Match drawn
M. Chinnaswamy Stadium, Bangalore
Umpires: Borni Jamula and Jasbir Singh

- Karnataka won the toss and elected to bat.
- Karnataka won the Irani Cup due to their first innings lead.
