= Sulakshan Kulkarni =

Indian cricketer

Personal information
- Full name: Sulakshan Kashinath Kulkarni
- Born: 15 January 1967 (age 59); Sadashivgad, Karnataka, India
- Batting: Right-handed
- Role: Wicket-keeper

Domestic team information
- Years: Team
- 1985/86: Railways
- 1986/87–1998/99: Bombay / Mumbai
- 1991/92: Assam
- 1992/93: Vidarbha
- 2001/02: Madhya Pradesh

Career statistics
Competition	FC	List A
Matches	65	13
Runs scored	3,332	130
Batting average	38.29	21.66
100s/50s	6/13	0/0
Top score	239	28
Balls bowled
Wickets
Bowling average
5 wickets in innings
10 wickets in match
Best bowling
Catches/stumpings	122/21	10/2
- Source: ESPNcricinfo, 3 January 2016

Sulakshan Kashinath Kulkarni (born 15 January 1967) is a former Indian first-class cricketer who played for various teams, mainly Mumbai cricket team, from 1985/86 to 2001/02. He became a cricket coach after retirement.

== Playing career ==
Kulkarni was a wicket-keeper who batted right-handed. He batted at various positions in his career including opening, and played as a specialist batsman in several matches. He made his debut for Railways cricket team at the age of 18, but switched to Bombay cricket team in the following season. He is best known for his 459-run opening partnership with Wasim Jaffer in 1996/97 against Saurashtra cricket team, Mumbai's highest partnership for any wicket. He was dismissed for his personal best score of 239, while Jaffer went on to score an unbeaten triple-hundred. He played for five different Ranji teams, but 46 of his 65 first-class appearances were for Mumbai. Kulkarni announced his retirement in February 2000 at the age of 33. He then played one season for Madhya Pradesh in 2001/02.

== Coaching career ==
Kulkarni coached Mumbai under-19s for three years before working as Vidarbha cricket team's head coach for two seasons ending 2010/11. After a successful stint with Vidarbha, he was selected to coach Central Zone cricket team. He became head coach of Mumbai cricket team in 2011/12 and coached the team for three seasons. During his tenure the team ended as semifinalists in the 2011–12 Ranji Trophy and emerged champions of the 2012–13 Ranji Trophy.

He has appointed as batting coach of Nepal Cricket team in 2018 for one month. In 2019, he was appointed as the head coach for Physically Challenged Cricket World Cup for Team India which emerged as winners in its first historical win.

He was appointed as the head coach of Tamil Nadu cricket team in 2023.

In May 2024, he was appointed as the head coach of Maharashtra cricket team for a two-year term.
