= 1967–68 Irani Cup =

Indian cricket match

The 1967–68 Irani Cup match was played 3-6 November 1967 at the Brabourne Stadium in Bombay. The match between Rest of India and the reigning Ranji Trophy champions Bombay was a draw. Bombay won the Irani Cup due to their first innings lead.

== Scorecard ==
3-6 November 1967
Scorecard

Bombay	v	Rest of India
299 (114 overs); Ashok Mankad 79; Vasant Ranjane 4/75 (28 overs)		184 (87.1 overs); Prince Indrajitsinhji 60; Umesh Kulkarni 4/51 (25.1 overs)
284/8d (99.4 overs); Ashok Mankad 97; Samir Chakrabarti 4/59 (20 overs)		230/8 (93 overs); Vijay Bhosle 47; Bapu Nadkarni 3/16 (24 overs)

Match drawn
Brabourne Stadium, Bombay
Umpires: Ahmed Mamsa and Habib Choudhury

- Bombay won the toss and elected to bat.
