= 1982–83 Irani Cup =

Indian cricket match

The 1982–83 Irani Cup match was scheduled to be played between 20 and 23 October 1982 at the Feroz Shah Kotla. Rest of India defeated the reigning Ranji Trophy champions Delhi by 5 wickets.

== Scorecard ==
20-23 October 1982
Scorecard

Delhi	v	Rest of India
429 (127.2 overs); Sandeep Patil 125; Balwinder Sandhu 5/110 (30 overs)		267 (80 overs); Krishnamachari Srikkanth 83; Maninder Singh 6/66 (28 overs)
258 (88.1 overs); Mohinder Amarnath 52; Laxman Sivaramakrishnan 4/127 (30 overs)		424/5 (83.2 overs); Ashok Malhotra 116*; Maninder Singh 2/180 (38.2 overs)

Rest of India won by 5 wickets.
Feroz Shah Kotla, Delhi
Umpires: Piloo Reporter and V Vikramraju

- Delhi won the toss elected to bat.
- Bombay won the Irani Cup due to their first innings lead.
