= 1994–95 Irani Cup =

Indian cricket match

The 1994–95 Irani Cup was played from 11 to 15 October 1994 at the Wankhede Stadium in Bombay. The match between reigning Ranji Trophy champions Bombay and Rest of India was drawn. Bombay won the Irani Cup through their first innings lead.

== Scorecard ==
11-15 October 1994
Scorecard

Bombay	v	Rest of India
424 (137.3 overs); Zubin Bharucha 164; Iqbal Siddiqui 4/106 (30 overs)		193 (70.1 overs); Vikram Rathour 60; Sairaj Bahutule 7/63 (30.1 overs)
151/4 (60 overs); Amol Muzumdar 55*; Prashant Vaidya 2/20 (10 overs)		485/6d (144 overs) following on Rahul Dravid 132*; Paras Mhambrey 2/83 (32 overs)

Match drawn
Wankhede Stadium, Bombay
Umpires: Shyam Bansal and V. K. Ramaswamy

- Bombay won the toss and elected to bat.
- Bombay won the Irani Cup through their first innings lead.
