= 1970–71 Irani Cup =

Indian cricket match

The 1970–71 Irani Trophy match was played from 18 to 20 December 1970 at the Eden Gardens in Calcutta. The match between reigning Ranji Trophy champions Bombay and Rest of India was a draw. Bombay won the Irani Cup through their first innings lead.

== Scorecard ==
18 - 20 December 1970
Scorecard

Bombay	v	Rest of India
418 (130.5 overs); Ajit Wadekar 164; Mohinder Amarnath 3/52 (28 overs)		378 (162.2 overs); Salim Durani 105; Eknath Solkar 5/121 (53.2 overs)
99/1d (37 overs); Sunil Gavaskar 46*; Vaman Kumar 1/16 (12 overs)		25/0 (10 overs); Hemant Kanitkar 19*

Match drawn
Eden Gardens, Calcutta
Umpires: B Satyaji Rao and Sunil Banerjee

- Bombay won the toss and elected to bat.
