= 1968–69 Irani Cup =

Indian cricket match

The 1968–69 Irani Cup match was played 25–28 November 1968 at the Brabourne Stadium in Bombay. Rest of India defeated the reigning Ranji Trophy champions Bombay by 119 runs.

== Scorecard ==
25-28 November 1968
Scorecard

Rest of India	v	(H) Bombay
341 (137.2 overs); Mansoor Ali Khan Pataudi 98; Eknath Solkar 4/62 (45 overs)		224 (103.1 overs); Sudhir Naik 92; Chandrasekhar Joshi 5/77 (35 overs)
191/9d (109 overs); Hanumant Singh 43; Eknath Solkar 5/72 (46 overs)		189 (62.2 overs); Eknath Solkar 50; Srinivas Venkataraghavan 5/55 (21.2 overs)

Rest of India won by 119 runs
Brabourne Stadium, Bombay
Umpires: Ahmed Mamsa and MV Chitnis

- Rest of India won the toss and elected to bat.
- Kiran Ashar (Bombay) was absent hurt in both innings.
