= Hoshang Amroliwala =

Indian cricketer (1931–2017)

Personal information
- Full name: Hoshang Dadiba Amroliwala
- Born: 12 August 1931; Bombay, British India
- Died: 29 December 2017 (aged 86)
- Source: ESPNcricinfo, 10 April 2018

Hoshang Amroliwala (12 August 1931 – 29 December 2017) was an Indian cricketer. He played 44 first-class matches for Mumbai between 1956 and 1964. He was the first cricketer to take a five-wicket haul in the Irani Cup and played in five finals of the Ranji Trophy. He also represented the Parsi Cyclists club in the Kanga League A Division in the 1950s and 1960s.

== See also ==
- List of Mumbai cricketers
