= Ranjan Baindoor =

Indian cricketer (1950–2016)

Personal information
- Born: 28 January 1950; Bombay, India
- Died: 4 April 2016 (aged 66); Mumbai
- Batting: Right-handed
- Bowling: Right arm Offbreak
- Role: All-rounder

Ranjan Baindoor (28 January 1950 – 4 April 2016) was an Indian cricketer. He played sixteen first-class matches for Mumbai between 1974 and 1985.

== Career ==
Baindoor served as the chairman of the MCA Under-19 selection committee. Between 1974-75 and 1983-84, he played four matches for Railways and 12 matches for Bombay, scoring 267 runs and taking 19 wickets. He was part of the Bombay team led by Sunil Gavaskar that won the Ranji Trophy in the 1983-84 season by defeating Delhi. After sustaining a hand injury during the second innings of a match, Baindoor was unable to bowl and later retired from first-class cricket.

He died on 4 April 2016, due to a heart attack.
