= 2022–23 Irani Cup =

Cricket tournament

Rest of India	Madhya Pradesh
484	294
&	&
246	198
- Rest of India won by 238 runs
- Date: 1–5 March 2023
- Venue: Captain Roop Singh Stadium, Gwalior
- Player of the match: Yashasvi Jaiswal (Rest of India)
- Umpires: Sadashiv Iyer and Rohan Pandit

The 2022–23 Irani Cup, also known as Mastercard Irani Trophy due to sponsorship reasons, was the 59th edition of the Irani Cup, a first-class cricket competition in India. It was played as a one-off match between Madhya Pradesh, the winners of the 2021–22 Ranji Trophy, and a Rest of India cricket team, from 1 to 5 March 2023.

In March 2020, the Board of Control for Cricket in India (BCCI) confirmed that all domestic cricket in India was suspended due to coronavirus, including the 2019–20 Irani Cup. However, the cancelled match was played as an opening match of this season from 1 to 5 October, with the 2019–20 Ranji Trophy winners Saurashtra playing against a Rest of India team.

== Squads ==
Madhya Pradesh	Rest of India
Himanshu Mantri (c, wk)	Mayank Agarwal (c)
Anubhav Agarwal	Akash Deep
Arham Aquil	Harvik Desai
Yash Dubey	Yash Dhull
Harsh Gawli	Abhimanyu Easwaran
Mihir Hirwani	Baba Indrajith
Venkatesh Iyer	Yashasvi Jaiswal
Saransh Jain	Mukesh Kumar
Kumar Kartikeya	Saurabh Kumar
Avesh Khan	Sudip Kumar Gharami
Ankit Kushwah	~~Mayank Markande~~
Rajat Patidar	Shams Mulani
Akshat Raghuwanshi	Pulkit Narang
Shubham Sharma	Navdeep Saini
Aman Solanki	Chetan Sakariya
Gaurav Yadav	Upendra Yadav (wk)
	Atit Sheth

On 28 February 2023, Mayank Markande was ruled out of Rest of India's squad due to a right index finger injury. Shams Mulani was named as his replacement.

== Match ==
1–5 March 2023
Scorecard

Rest of India	v	Madhya Pradesh
484 (121.3 overs); Yashasvi Jaiswal 213 (259); Avesh Khan 4/74 (23.3 overs)		294 (112.5 overs); Yash Dubey 109 (258); Pulkit Narang 4/65 (25.5 overs)
246 (71.3 overs); Yashasvi Jaiswal 144 (157); Saransh Jain 2/56 (17.4 overs)		198 (58.4 overs); Himanshu Mantri 51 (81); Saurabh Kumar 3/60 (17.4 overs)

Rest of India won by 238 runs
Captain Roop Singh Stadium, Gwalior
Umpires: Sadashiv Iyer and Rohan Pandit
Player of the match: Yashasvi Jaiswal (Rest of India)

- Rest of India won the toss and elected to bat.
- Arham Aquil (Madhya Pradesh) made his first-class debut.
