= Punjab Agricultural University Stadium =

Field Hockey Stadium in PAU, Ludhiana, India

- Punjab Agricultural University Ground
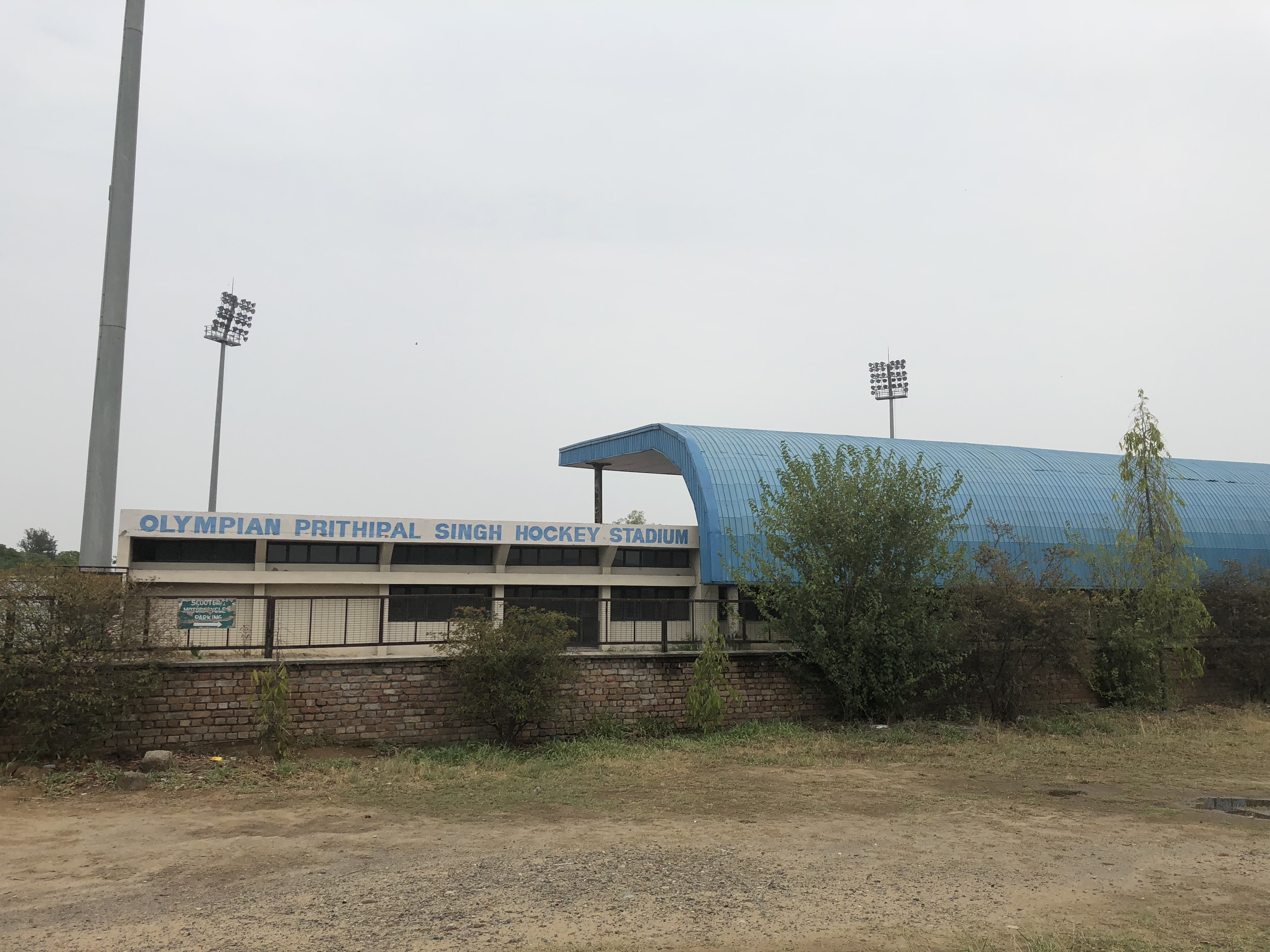
- Full name: Punjab Agricultural University Sports Complex
- Location: Ludhiana, India
- Owner: Punjab Agricultural University
- Operator: Punjab Agricultural University
- Capacity: 10,000

Construction
- Groundbreaking: 1962
- Built: 1989
- Opened: 1989
- Renovated: 2001
- Expanded: 2001

Punjab Agricultural University Stadium is a multipurpose stadium located in Punjab Agricultural University Campus, Ludhiana, Punjab. The stadium is owned by Punjab Agricultural University.

The stadium has facilities for cricket and football, as well as an astroturf for field hockey. In addition, there is a swimming pool and a velodrome.

There are also facilities for indoor sports such as basketball, badminton, gymnastics, handball, volleyball, lawn tennis, table tennis, weight lifting, and Kabaddi. The Ground has also hosted 10 Ranji including a final in 1993 and one Irani Trophy matches from 1987 to 1999 and 10 List A matches.
