= 1965–66 Irani Cup =

Indian cricket match

The 1965–66 Irani Trophy match was played 18–21 September 1965 at the Nehru Stadium in Madras. Rest of India played the reigning Ranji Trophy champions Bombay. The rain affected match was drawn.

== Scorecard ==
18 - 21 September 1965
Scorecard

Rest of India	v	Bombay
243 (114.5 overs); Rusi Surti 53; Bapu Nadkarni 4/40 (29.5 overs)		174/9 (100 overs); Ajit Wadekar 64; Venkataraman Subramanya 3/18 (9 overs)

Match drawn
Nehru Stadium, Madras
Umpires: I. Gopalakrishnan and V. Rajagopal

- Bombay won the toss and elected to field.
