= Pandurang Salgaonkar =

Personal information
- Full name: Pandurang Mahadev Salgaonkar
- Born: 15 October 1949 (age 77); Malvan, Bombay State, India
- Batting: Right-handed
- Bowling: Right-arm fast
- Role: Bowler

International information
- National side: India

Domestic team information
- Years: Team
- 1972–1981: Maharashtra

Career statistics
Competition	First-class	List A
Matches	63	6
Runs scored	1,039	4
Batting average	17.03	2.00
100s/50s	1/1	–/–
Top score	103	3
Balls bowled	10,242	321
Wickets	214	6
Bowling average	26.70	33.66
5 wickets in innings	11	–
10 wickets in match	1	–
Best bowling	7/72	2/23
Catches/stumpings	26/–	4/–
- Source: Cricket Archive, 18 August 2013

Pandurang Mahadev Salgaonkar (sometimes spelled Salgaoncar) (born 15 October 1949) is a former Indian cricketer who played as a fast bowler for Maharashtra from 1971–72 to 1981–82.

== Early career ==
In 1971–72, his debut season, Salgaonkar took 15 wickets at 23.33 in four Ranji Trophy matches, immediately establishing a reputation as the fastest bowler in India.

At the start of the 1972–73 season he played for Rest of India against Bombay in the Irani Cup, taking six wickets, including the Indian captain Ajit Wadekar twice. In his next match, playing in the Ranji Trophy for Maharashtra against Bombay, he dismissed Sunil Gavaskar twice. His next two matches were for West Zone in the Duleep Trophy. He took his best first-class match figures of 10 for 111 (5 for 55 and 5 for 56) against South Zone in the semi-final and a few days later took his best innings figures of 7 for 72 in the final against Central Zone, giving West Zone the trophy.

He took only one wicket when West Zone played the touring MCC in Ahmedabad in a match dominated by batsmen and spin bowlers, and finished the 1972–73 season with seven wickets in a narrow loss to Tamil Nadu in the semi-final of the Ranji Trophy. He took 54 wickets at 19.44 in the season. Wisden noted that "P.M. Salgoancar [sic] (Maharashtra), the country's new hope in medium-fast bowling, showed splendid improvement ..."

== Playing for India ==
Salgaonkar maintained good form in the early part of the 1973–74 season, and was selected to tour Sri Lanka with a strong Indian team in January and February 1974. Opening the bowling with Madan Lal, he took 5 for 42 and 2 for 79 against Sri Lanka in the second unofficial Test in Colombo, which India won after the first of the two matches was drawn.

He was not included in the Indian team that toured England in the first half of the 1974 season. India lost all three Tests by large margins. Relying almost entirely on spin, the Indian attack was ineffective on pitches favouring pace and seam, and took only 24 English wickets. Wisden commented: "Probably the Indians would have benefited from including Salgoankar [sic], of Maharashtra, easily the quickest bowler in the country and who, as it happened, came to England later for coaching at A.R. Gover's school." According to Vijay Lokapally, however, the coaching "tampered with his action and Salgaonkar could never do justice to his potential".

== Later career ==
In a semi-final of the Duleep Trophy in 1974–75, after the first two days had been washed out, Salgaonkar destroyed the East Zone batting, taking 6 for 39 and dismissing East Zone for 83. East Zone just managed to hold on for a draw. He played without notable success for Rest of India against Karnataka in the Irani Cup, and then, in his last match for West Zone, he took three expensive wickets against the touring West Indies cricket team, dismissing Alvin Kallicharran twice. In a Ranji Trophy match in 1974–75 at Nasik he bowled a ball that broke Sunil Gavaskar's finger.

After 1974–75 he played only for Maharashtra in the Ranji Trophy, never quite regaining the venom of his earlier years. The highlight of his later career was his only century, 103 against Baroda in 1980–81.

The Indian cricket historian Sujit Mukherjee said Salgaonkar "gave promise of bowling at stroke-hastening pace and arming India with a weapon that had been wanting ever since Desai's decline. Though wayward in direction, he had the stamina to bowl lengthy spells without slackening speed and the ability to obtain awkward bounce", but when he was not selected to tour England in 1974 he became "disheartened". "His career must have put off many strong young men from trying to bowl fast."

== After retirement ==
Salgaonkar runs a cricket coaching academy in Pune and is the chief pitch curator at the Maharashtra Cricket Association Stadium in Pune. He has served as chief selector of the Maharashtra Ranji Trophy team. In 2009, 2010 and 2011 he refereed matches in the Maharashtra Premier League, a local Twenty20 competition.

On 25 October 2017, he was sacked as chief pitch curator at Pune for allegedly allowing people to tamper with the pitch before a major match. A couple of days later Maharashtra Cricket Association (MCA) said it had only suspended him as head groundsman of the Pune pitch. He later resumed his duties there.
