= Bhupinder Singh (cricketer, born 1970) =

Indian cricketer (born 1970)

Personal information
- Born: 19 December 1970; Taran Taran, Punjab, India
- Batting: Right-handed
- Role: Batsman
- Relatives: Rajinder Singh (uncle)
- Source: ESPNcricinfo profile, 22 June 2016

Bhupinder Singh (born 19 November 1970) is a former Indian cricketer. He played domestic cricket for Punjab from 1989 to 1998 as well as India national under-19 cricket team from 1988 to 1990.
