= Dhiraj Parsana =

Indian cricketer (born 1947)

Personal information
- Full name: Dhiraj Devshibhai Parsana
- Born: 2 December 1947 (age 78); Rajkot, Gujarat, India
- Batting: Left-handed
- Bowling: Left-arm medium fast; Slow left arm orthodox

International information
- National side: India
- Test debut (cap 143): 12 January 1979 v West Indies
- Last Test: 24 January 1979 v West Indies

Career statistics
Competition	Test	First-class
Matches	2	93
Runs scored	1	2,943
Batting average	0.50	26.51
100s/50s	0/0	2/12
Top score	1	106*
Balls bowled	120	19,337
Wickets	1	320
Bowling average	50.00	22.24
5 wickets in innings	0	20
10 wickets in match	0	2
Best bowling	1/32	7/46
Catches/stumpings	0/–	69/–
- Source: ESPNcricinfo, 10 September 2022

Dhiraj Devshibhai Parsana (born 2 December 1947) is an Indian former cricketer who played in two Test matches in 1979 against the touring West Indies side as an all-rounder. He represented Gujarat and Saurashtra in the Ranji Trophy.
