= Ramnath Parkar =

Indian cricketer (1946–1999)

Personal information
- Full name: Ramnath Dhondu Parkar
- Born: 31 October 1946; Bombay, British India
- Died: 11 August 1999 (aged 52); Mumbai, Maharashtra, India
- Batting: Right-handed

International information
- National side: India
- Test debut (cap 129): 20 December 1972 v England
- Last Test: 30 December 1972 v England

Career statistics
Competition	Test	First-class
Matches	2	85
Runs scored	80	4455
Batting average	20.00	33.75
100s/50s	0/0	8/21
Top score	35	197
Balls bowled	–	96
Wickets	–	1
Bowling average	–	55.00
5 wickets in innings	–	0
10 wickets in match	–	0
Best bowling	–	1/4
Catches/stumpings	0/–	64/–
- Source: CricInfo, 20 November 2022

Ramnath Dhondu Parkar (31 October 1946 – 11 August 1999) was an Indian cricketer who played in two test matches in 1972–73 against Tony Lewis' England team touring India. He represented Bombay in the Ranji Trophy and played in 85 first class matches in his career. He was the opening partner of Sunil Gavaskar for Bombay for many years.

Parkar became unconscious when his two-wheeler was knocked down by another vehicle in Mumbai in December 1995. Multiple surgeries and therapies were tried to revive him. He remained in a coma for 43 months and died on 11 August 1999 at Lokmanya Tilak Memorial General Hospital, Mumbai.
