= Rajinder Ghai =

Indian cricketer (born 1960)

Cricket information
- Batting: Right-handed
- Bowling: Right-arm medium-fast

Career statistics
Competition	FC	ODI	LA
Matches	48	6	24
Runs scored	1,196	1	156
Batting average	28.47	1.00	19.50
100s/50s	1/7	0/0	0/1
Top score	114*	1	74*
Balls bowled	6,352	275	1,275
Wickets	119	3	32
Bowling average	32.21	86.66	26.75
5 wickets in innings	6	0	1
10 wickets in match	0	0	0
Best bowling	7/110	1/38	6/38
Catches/stumpings	14/–	0/–	5/–
- Source: Cricinfo, 6 March 2006

Rajinder (Raj) Singh Ghai (born 12 June 1960) is an Indian cricketer. He played Ranji Trophy for 10 years and captained the Punjab State team for 3 years. He also went on to play for Indian cricket team, India from 1984 to 1986. Playing in his first one-day international game against England he got Wicket of Tim Robinson in his first over, which is a rare feat. Praised by the press as one of the fastest Indian Bowler of his time along with Kapil Dev and Chetan Sharma, Raj was also famous for his hard hitting batsmanship, having achieved a highest score of 114 not-out against "Services" in 1986.
