= Gandhi Stadium =

Cricket Ground in Jalandhar, India

- Burlton Park; BS Bedi Stadium
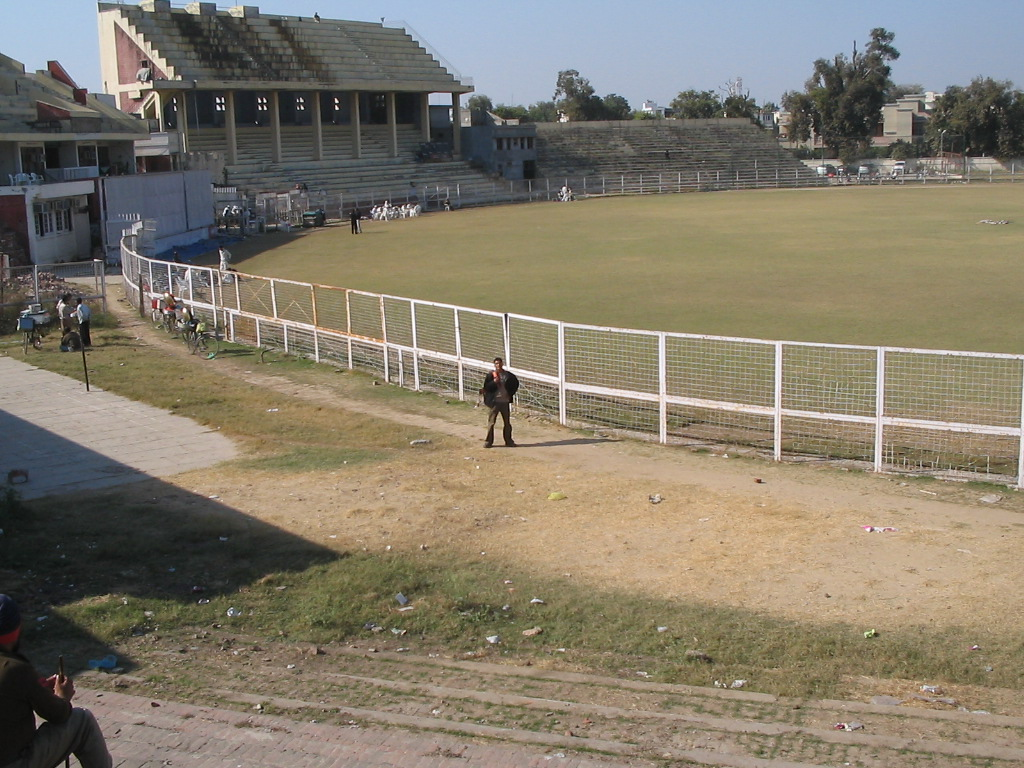
- Interactive map of Gandhi Stadium

Ground information
- Location: Jalandhar, Punjab
- Country: India
- Coordinates: 31°20′41″N 75°33′38.07″E
- Capacity: 16,000
- End names
- Pavilion End; Stadium End

International information
- Only men's Test: 24 September 1983: India v Pakistan
- First men's ODI: 20 December 1981: India v England
- Last men's ODI: 20 February 1994: India v Sri Lanka

Team information
Punjab	(1952 – 2000)
North Zone	(1961 – 1979)
- As of 16 December 2007; Source: CricketArchive

Gandhi Stadium or Burlton Park or BS Bedi Stadium is located in the city of Jalandhar, Punjab and is used for cricket matches. As of 19 August 2017 it has hosted 1 Test and 3 ODIs. The stadium should not be confused with the 10,000-capacity Gandhi Stadium in Ambikapur, which is used for cricket and football.

== History ==
The stadium was built in 1955 and serves as the home ground for two Indian domestic cricket teams: Punjab and North Zone. The stadium hosted a solitary Test Match against Pakistan as well as 3 ODI matches with the host team - India winning both of these matches.

The highest score in Test cricket was made by India who scored 374 against Pakistan. The most runs scored were by Anshuman Gaekwad (201 runs), Wasim Raja (125 runs) and Javed Miandad (66 runs). The most wickets taken were by Wasim Raja and Kapil Dev (4 wickets), along with Ravi Shastri (3 wickets). The highest score in ODI cricket was made by West Indies who scored 226 against Pakistan. The most runs scored were Dilip Vengsarkar (88 runs), Richie Richardson (77 runs) and Aamer Malik (77 runs). The most wickets taken were by Venkatapathy Raju (3 wickets), Graham Gooch (2 wickets) and Kapil Dev (2 wickets).

== Demolition and reconstruction ==
Currently, there is a plan to construct a sports complex in Jalandhar City. Reconstruction of this cricket ground and converting it into an international level cricket stadium is also included in the project. All the stands were demolished. However, due to some legal problems, this project was stopped for a while. A few months later some reconstruction was seen. The stadium is not hosting any matches currently because the main pitch is also being reconstructed. Although practice sessions for budding cricketers have not been stopped.

== See also ==
- List of Test cricket grounds
- One-Test wonder
