= Shrikant Kalyani =

Indian cricketer (born 1964)

Personal information
- Full name: Shrikant Jagannath Kalyani
- Born: 21 August 1964 (age 62); Pune, India
- Batting: Right-handed
- Bowling: Right-arm offbreak
- Role: Batsman

Domestic team information
- Years: Team
- 1983/84-1988/89: Maharashtra
- 1989/90-2000/01: Bengal
- Source: Cricinfo, 18 June 2016

Shrikant Kalyani (born 21 August 1964) is an Indian former cricketer. He played first-class cricket for Bengal and Maharashtra.

He was named as head coach of the Maharashtra cricket team for the 2016-17 Indian domestic season replacing Australian David Andrews, who coached the side in the last two seasons. He also became the fifth Maharashtra coach in six years.
