= Somashekar Shiraguppi =

Indian former first-class cricketer (born 1974)

Personal information
- Born: 14 June 1974 (age 52); Dharwad, Karnataka, India
- Batting: Right-handed
- Role: Wicket-keeper

Domestic team information
- Years: Team
- 1994/95–1999/00: Karnataka
- 2003/04: Goa

Career statistics
Competition	FC	List A
Matches	41	22
Runs scored	1,206	223
Batting average	22.33	23.63
100s/50s	1/4	0/0
Top score	125	48
Balls bowled	–	–
Wickets	–	–
Bowling average	–	–
5 wickets in innings	–	–
10 wickets in match	–	n/a
Best bowling	–	–
Catches/stumpings	92/20	23/7
- Source: ESPNcricinfo, 18 February 2016

Somashekar Shiraguppi (born 14 June 1974) is an Indian former first-class cricketer who played for Karnataka and Goa. He worked as a coach after his playing career.

== Career ==
Shiraguppi was a wicket-keeper who batted right-handed. He became Karnataka's first-choice wicket-keeper in the late-1990s and was part of the team's Ranji Trophy victory thrice (in 1995–96, 1997–98 and 1998–99) and Irani Cup victory twice (in 1995–96 and 1997–98). He played his last first-class match for Karnataka in February 2000, and appeared in a few matches for Goa in late 2003. He announced his retirement from first-class cricket in 2006. He finished his career with 41 first-class and 22 List A appearances, having scored over 1000 runs and effected 100-plus dismissals.

After his playing career, Shiraguppi coached cricketers. An NCA qualified Level C coach, He was the assistant coach of Karnataka senior team and coach of under-13 and under-17 teams. He has also worked as wicket-keeping coach of the Board of Control for Cricket in India Specialist Academy.

He co-authored the book "The Elite Batter", a batting guide for young cricketers, with Rajesh Kamath which was released in 2017.
