= Gopal Bose =

Indian cricketer (1947–2018)

Personal information
- Full name: Gopal Krishna Bose
- Born: 20 May 1947; Calcutta, British India
- Died: 26 August 2018 (aged 71); Birmingham, England
- Batting: Right-handed
- Bowling: Right-arm off-break

International information
- National side: India
- Only ODI (cap 12): 15 July 1974 v England
- Source: , 8 February 2006

Gopal Bose (20 May 1947 – 26 August 2018) was an Indian cricketer. He played domestic cricket for Bengal and played one One Day International for India against England in 1974.

Bose was born in Kolkata, Indian state of West Bengal. He was a relatively successful first-class player with an ability to play long innings. He was selected in the national team for the tour of Ceylon (now Sri Lanka) where he impressed with a 194-run partnership with Sunil Gavaskar. He was again selected in the 14-member squad for the West Indies tour of 1974–75 but was surprisingly left out of the playing eleven and was never considered thereafter. He represented Bengal for the rest of his career with much success. In his career Bose had scored 3757 runs in 78 first-class games with eight hundreds and 17 fifties. He also took 72 wickets.

Bose was the head coach of Kolkata's Cricket Club of Dhakuria(CCD). He died in Birmingham on 26 August 2018, following a heart attack.
