= Bantoo Singh =

Indian cricketer (born 1963)

Personal information
- Born: 17 February 1963 (age 63); Delhi, India
- Batting: Right-handed
- Bowling: Right-arm off break
- Role: Batsman
- Relatives: Dilbaugh Singh (father)

Domestic team information
- Years: Team
- 1985/86–1995/96: Delhi

Career statistics
Competition	FC	List A
Matches	69	33
Runs scored	3,694	607
Batting average	45.04	30.35
100s/50s	11/18	0/5
Top score	214	96*
Balls bowled	315	–
Wickets	3	–
Bowling average	74.33	–
5 wickets in innings	0	–
10 wickets in match	0	n/a
Best bowling	1/4	–
Catches/stumpings	41/–	6/–
- Source: ESPNcricinfo, 26 December 2015

Bantoo Singh (born 17 February 1963), also spelled as Bantu Singh, is a former Indian first-class cricketer who played for Delhi cricket team from 1985/86 to 1995/96. In 2005, he became a selector for the Delhi District Cricket Association.

== Life and career ==
Singh was born on 17 February 1963 in Delhi. His father Dilbaugh Singh was the founder of Delhi Gymkhana Club and had also played first-class cricket for Jammu and Kashmir cricket team. He had also worked as a selector of Delhi.

Singh played as a right-handed middle-order batsman, representing Delhi between the 1985/86 to 1995/96 seasons. He scored more than 3000 first-class runs and 11 hundreds including hundreds in two Ranji Trophy finals: 179 against Bengal in the 1988–89 Ranji Trophy final and 123 against Tamil Nadu in the 1991–92 Ranji Trophy final. He had also captained the team in a few matches and appeared for North Zone cricket team in Duleep Trophy. Although he had played his last first-class match in 1995/96, he announced his retirement only in November 2005.

In August 2005, Delhi District Cricket Association appointed Singh as a member of the five-man Delhi selection panel. He later became the chairman of Delhi under-19 selection panel.
