= Karnail Singh Stadium =

Sports stadium

- Paharganj Railways Stadium

Ground information
- Location: Basant Road, Railway Colony, Paharganj, New Delhi
- Country: India
- Capacity: 5,000

International information
- Only women's ODI: 12 December 1997: Sri Lanka v West Indies

Team information
Railways football team Railways women's football team Railways cricket team
- As of 9 December 2019; Source: ESPNcricinfo

Karnail Singh Stadium is a multipurpose sports venue located in Delhi, India and is owned by the Indian Railways. Located next to the New Delhi Railway Station, the ground is used for athletics, football, hockey, cricket, boxing, and badminton. Apart from sports, the ground has been a venue for the Terry Fox Run, a charity event which was held in 2008.

== History ==
Originally known as Paharganj Railways Stadium, the ground was built in 1954 due to the efforts of Karnail Singh, then Chairman of the Railway board. In 1978, the Railways Sports Promotion Board renamed the stadium as the Karnail Singh Stadium in his honour.

== Sporting activities ==
The ground was the venue for an Athletics open meet in 1964 where Paan Singh Tomar set a new national steeplechase record. Karnail Singh Stadium hosted the National Weightlifting Championship in 2004. In 2008, the 56th National Kabaddi Championship was held at the ground. The ground hosts a boxing hall, which is used for training by boxers such as Akhil Kumar and hosted the National Boxing Championship in 2007. It was also used as a training venue prior to the Commonwealth Boxing Championship in 2010.

The ground has been home to the Railways cricket team in the Ranji Trophy for approximately five decades. Karnail Singh Stadium was the venue for the Ranji Trophy finals in 2002 when the Railways won the Ranji Trophy for the first time. In 2007, the Railways proposed to build a new dedicated cricket stadium to replace Karnail Singh Stadium as its home ground, citing lack and overuse of facilities. A unique feature of the ground is its old wooden green-board type scoreboard which is updated after each run is scored, unlike other manual ones which are updated in multiples of ten. Though the stadium has not hosted international men's cricket, it was one of the 1997 Women's Cricket World Cup venues, hosting a One Day International played by Sri Lanka and West Indies. In 1999, the ground was the venue for a veterans tournament, World Masters Series.

== Controversies ==
Karnail Singh Stadium was banned from hosting Ranji Trophy matches for the 2012–13 season by the BCCI after the pitch for a match between Railways and Saurashtra in the previous season was found to be of "poor condition". The Railway Sports Promotion Board was requested to host its matches at another venue in February 2012. RSPB has indicated that it will appeal the ban on Karnail Singh Stadium.
