= 2012–13 Irani Cup =

Rajasthan	Rest of India
253 & 275	607/7d
- Rest of India won by an innings and 79 runs
- Date: 21 September 2012 – 24 September 2012
- Venue: M Chinnaswamy Stadium, Bengaluru

The 2012–13 Irani Cup, also called 2012–13 Irani Trophy, was the 51st season of the Irani Cup, a first-class cricket competition in India. It was a one-off match which was played from 21 September 2012 to 24 September 2013 between the 2011–12 Ranji champions Rajasthan and the Rest of India team. M Chinnaswamy Stadium, Bengaluru hosted the match. Rest of India retained the Irani Cup by defeating Rajasthan by an innings and 79 runs.
