= Vidarbha Cricket Association Ground =

Cricket stadium

Coordinates: 21°09′26.2″N 79°04′35.5″E

- VCA Ground
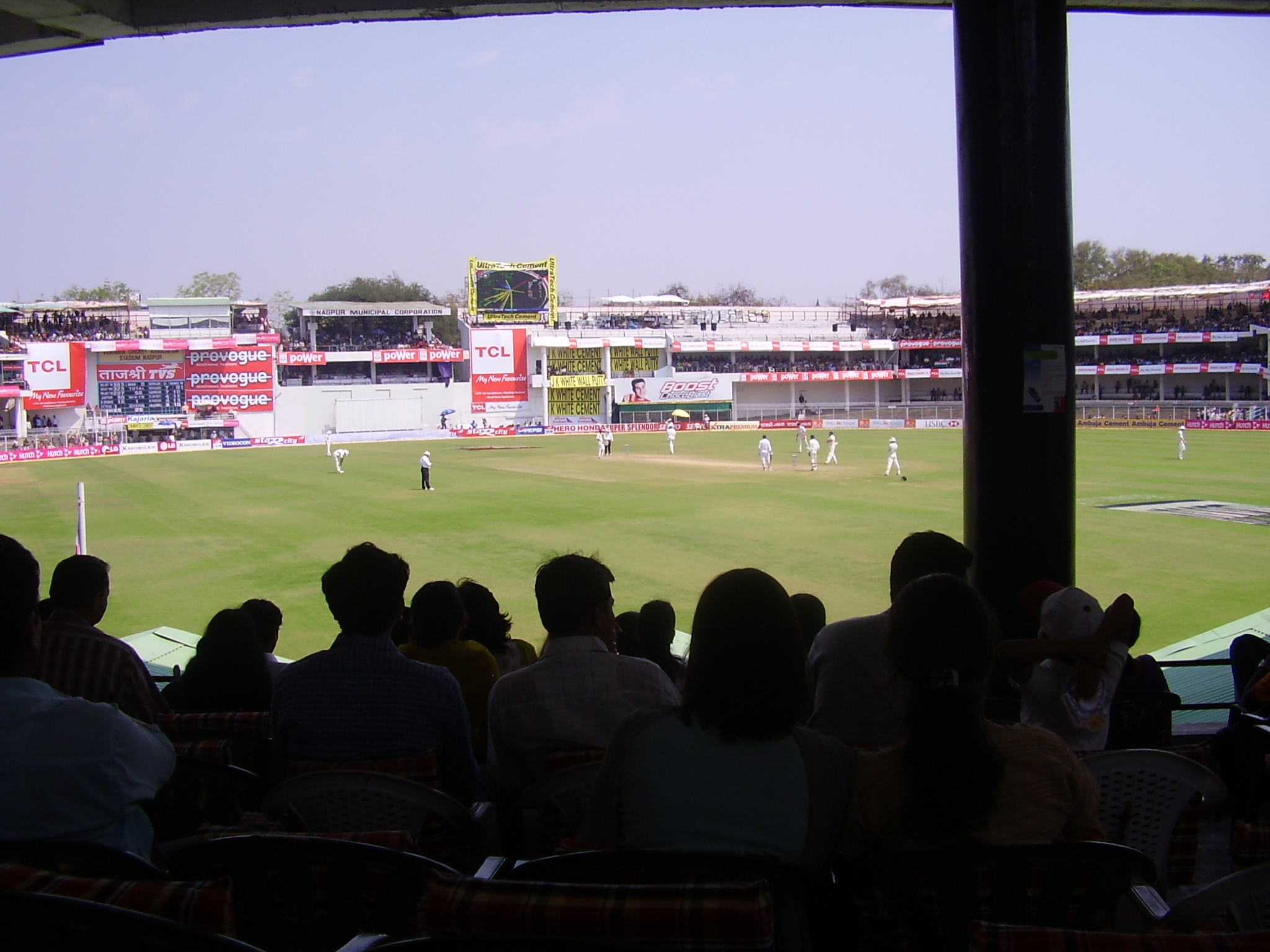
- VCA Ground, Civil Lines, Nagpur
- Interactive map of Vidarbha Cricket Association Ground

Ground information
- Location: Nagpur
- Country: India
- Establishment: 1929 (First match recorded)
- Capacity: 40,000
- Owner: Vidarbha Cricket Association
- Operator: Vidarbha Cricket Association
- End names
- Jaika End; Church End

International information
- First men's Test: 3 October 1965: India v New Zealand
- Last men's Test: 1 March 2006: India v England
- First men's ODI: 23 January 1985: India v England
- Last men's ODI: 14 October 2007: India v Australia
- Only women's ODI: 18 December 1997: Australia v England
- As of 9 December 2019; Source: Cricinfo

The Vidarbha Cricket Association Ground is a cricket ground located in the city of Nagpur.

The ground is known as the VCA Ground and is located in Central Zone. Its first match was played in October 1969. As of 19 August 2017, it has hosted nine Tests and 14 ODIs.

Its role as an international venue has been succeeded by the Vidarbha Cricket Association Stadium, but it continues to be used as a domestic cricket ground by the Vidarbha and Uttar Pradesh cricket teams.

In 1995, during the 5th ODI between India and New Zealand, a wall in the East Stand collapsed, killing 9 people and injuring 70 others.

== History ==
The ground is the tenth Test venue in India.

Chetan Sharma took the first Cricket World Cup hat-trick. With the wickets of Ken Rutherford, Ian Smith and Ewen Chatfield in Nagpur.

Sunil Gavaskar performed a one-day, World Cup century for India against New Zealand in their final league encounter of the 1987 Reliance World Cup.

The pitch's wickets were re-layed in 1999. Strangely, the wicket was constructed with a 30-inch deep, double-brick layer (normally there is a 15-inch brick layer). This facilitates extra pace and bounce.

The local critics were up-in-arms at how the curator ignored the home team's cause and prepared a fast wicket that helped the opposition fast bowlers. But the curator insisted that he had simply followed the instructions of the pitch panel. Today Nagpur is one of the only grounds to assist genuine fast bowlers in pace and movement and several first-class games in the 2004/05 season ended within three days as the medium-pacers reaped rich rewards.

== Records ==
=== Test ===
==== Batting ====
- Highest team total: 609/6 dec, by India against Zimbabwe in 2000/01, then 570/7 and 546/9, all by India.
- Lowest team total: 109, by India against New Zealand in 1969/70.
- Highest individual score: 232*, by Andy Flower against India in 2000/01.
- Most runs scored by Sachin Tendulkar (659 runs), Rahul Dravid (423 runs) and Andy Flower (298 runs).

==== Bowling ====
- Best bowling in an innings: 7/51, by Maninder Singh against Sri Lanka in 1986/87.
- Leading wicket takers Anil Kumble (20 wickets), Zaheer Khan (12 wickets) and Maninder Singh (10 wickets).

=== One Day International ===
==== Batting ====
- Highest team total: 350, by India against Sri Lanka in 2005/06, New Zealand 348/3 and India 338/3.
- Lowest team total: 154, by Zimbabwe against Australia in 1995/96.
- Highest individual score: 149, by Shivnarine Chanderpaul against India in 2006/07.
- Most runs scored by Sourav Ganguly (398 runs), Rahul Dravid (392 runs) and Sachin Tendulkar (390 runs).

==== Bowling ====
- Best bowling in an innings: 6/29, by Patrick Patterson against India in 1987/88.
- Leading wicket takers were Ravi Shastri (8 wickets), Patrick Patterson (6 wickets) and Abdul Qadir (6 wickets).

== List of Centuries ==
=== Key ===
- * denotes that the batsman was not out.
- Inns. denotes the number of the innings in the match.
- Balls denotes the number of balls faced in an innings.
- NR denotes that the number of balls was not recorded.
- Parentheses next to the player's score denotes his century number at Edgbaston.
- The column title Date refers to the date the match started.
- The column title Result refers to the player's team result

=== Test Centuries ===
No.	Score	Player	Team	Balls	Inns.	Opposing team	Date	Result
1	131	Mohinder Amarnath	India	301	2	Sri Lanka	27 December 1986	Won
2	153	Dilip Vengsarkar	India	–	2	Sri Lanka	27 December 1986	Won
3	107	Navjot Singh Sidhu	India	231	1	West Indies	1 December 1994	Draw
4	179	Sachin Tendulkar	India	322	1	West Indies	1 December 1994	Draw
5	125*	Jimmy Adams	West Indies	312	2	India	1 December 1994	Draw
6	110	Shiv Sunder Das	India	175	1	Zimbabwe	25 November 2000	Draw
7	162	Rahul Dravid	India	301	1	Zimbabwe	25 November 2000	Draw
8	201*	Sachin Tendulkar	India	281	1	Zimbabwe	25 November 2000	Draw
9	106*	Grant Flower	Zimbabwe	196	2	India	25 November 2000	Draw
10	102	Alistair Campbell	Zimbabwe	186	3	India	25 November 2000	Draw
11	232*	Andy Flower	Zimbabwe	444	3	India	25 November 2000	Draw
12	105	Shiv Sunder Das	India	203	2	Zimbabwe	21 February 2002	Won
13	176	Sachin Tendulkar	India	316	2	Zimbabwe	21 February 2002	Won
14	100*	Sanjay Bangar	India	155	2	Zimbabwe	21 February 2002	Won
15	114	Damien Martyn	Australia	165	1	India	26 October 2004	Won
16	134*	Paul Collingwood	England	252	1	India	1 March 2006	Draw
17	104*	Alastair Cook	England	243	3	India	1 March 2006	Draw
18	100	Wasim Jaffer	India	198	4	England	1 March 2006	Won

=== One Day Internationals ===
No.	Score	Player	Team	Balls	Inns.	Opposing team	Date	Result
1	103*	Sunil Gavaskar	India	88	2	New Zealand	31 October 1987	Won
2	101*	Ravi Shastri	India	147	1	Sri Lanka	1 December 1990	Won
3	104	Aravinda de Silva	Sri Lanka	124	2	India	1 December 1990	Lost
4	114	Nathan Astle	New Zealand	128	1	India	26 November 1995	Won
5	130*	Saurav Ganguly	India	160	1	Sri Lanka	22 March 1999	Won
6	116	Rahul Dravid	India	118	1	Sri Lanka	22 March 1999	Won
7	103	Chris Gayle	West Indies	116	2	India	9 November 2002	Won
8	149*	Shivnarine Chanderpaul	West Indies	136	2	India	21 January 2007	Lost
9	107*	Andrew Symonds	Australia	88	1	India	14 October 2007	Won

== List of Five Wicket Hauls ==
=== Key ===
Symbol	Meaning
†	The bowler was man of the match
‡	10 or more wickets taken in the match
§	One of two five-wicket hauls by the bowler in the match
Date	Day the Test started or ODI was held
Inn	Innings in which five-wicket haul was taken
Overs	Number of overs bowled.
Runs	Number of runs conceded
Wkts	Number of wickets taken
Econ	Runs conceded per over
Batsmen	Batsmen whose wickets were taken
Drawn	The match was drawn.

=== Tests ===
No.	Bowler	Date	Team	Opposing team	Inn	Overs	Runs	Wkts	Econ	Batsmen	Result
1	Srinivas Venkataraghavan	3 October 1969	India	New Zealand	3	30.1	74	6	2.45	Graham Dowling; Mark Burgess; Glenn Turner; Ken Wadsworth; Bob Cunis; Dayle Hadlee	Lost
2	Hedley Howarth	3 October 1969	New Zealand	India	4	23	34	5	1.47	Ajit Wadekar; Rusi Surti; Chetan Chauhan; Ambar Roy; Mansoor Ali Khan Pataudi	Won
3	Ravi Shastri †	5 October 1983	India	Pakistan	2	30.4	75	5	2.44	Mohsin Khan; Wasim Raja; Wasim Bari; Tahir Naqqash; Azeem Hafeez	Drawn
4	Mohammad Nazir	5 October 1983	Pakistan	India	3	50	72	5	1.44	Anshuman Gaekwad; Sunil Gavaskar; Dilip Vengsarkar; Ravi Shastri; Kirti Azad	Drawn
5	Shivlal Yadav	27 December 1986	India	Sri Lanka	1	19.1	76	5	3.96	Asanka Gurusinha; Aravinda de Silva; Guy de Alwis; Arjuna Ranatunga; Asoka de Silva	Won
6	Maninder Singh †	27 December 1986	India	Sri Lanka	3	17.4	51	7	2.88	Roy Dias; Aravinda de Silva; Duleep Mendis; Arjuna Ranatunga; Ravi Ratnayeke; Asoka de Silva; Guy de Alwis	Won
7	Carl Hooper	1 December 1994	West Indies	India	1	40	116	5	2.9	Manoj Prabhakar; Vinod Kambli; Navjot Singh Sidhu; Mohammad Azharuddin; Sanjay Manjrekar	Draw
8	Venkatapathy Raju	1 December 1994	India	India	2	50	127	5	2.54	Anderson Cummins; Brian Lara; Keith Arthurton; Shivnarine Chanderpaul; Junior Murray	Draw
9	Ravindra Pushpakumara	26 November 1997	Sri Lanka	India	1	32	122	5	3.81	Nayan Mongia; Sachin Tendulkar; Mohammad Azharuddin; Sourav Ganguly; Abey Kuruvilla	Draw
10	Ray Price	21 February 2002	Zimbabwe	India	2	68	182	5	2.67	Deep Dasgupta; Shiv Sunder Das; Sourav Ganguly; VVS Laxman; Sachin Tendulkar	Lost
11	Anil Kumble	21 February 2002	India	Zimbabwe	3	37	63	5	1.7	Alistair Campbell; Andy Flower; Gavin Rennie; Grant Flower; Heath Streak	Won
12	Jason Gillespie	26 October 2004	Australia	India	2	22.5	56	5	2.45	Aakash Chopra; Sachin Tendulkar; Ajit Agarkar; Murali Kartik; Zaheer Khan	Won
13	Matthew Hoggard	1 March 2006	England	India	2	30.5	57	6	1.84	Virender Sehwag; Rahul Dravid; Wasim Jaffer; VVS Laxman; Irfan Pathan; S. Sreesanth	Draw

=== One Day Internationals ===
No.	Bowler	Date	Team	Opposing team	Inn	Overs	Runs	Wkts	Econ	Batsmen	Result
1	Patrick Patterson	8 December 1987	West Indies	India	2	9.4	29	6	3.00	Arun Lal; Anshuman Gaekwad; Krishnamachari Srikkanth; Kapil Dev; Ravi Shastri; Kiran More	Won

== See also ==
- Vidarbha Cricket Association Stadium
- List of Test cricket grounds
