= Padmakar Shivalkar =

Indian cricketer (1940–2025)

Personal information
- Born: 14 September 1940; Mumbai, Maharashtra, India
- Died: 3 March 2025 (aged 84); Mumbai, Maharashtra, India
- Batting: Right-handed
- Bowling: Slow left-arm orthodox

Career statistics
Competition	First-class
Matches	124
Runs scored	515
Batting average	9.36
100s/50s	0/0
Top score	37
Balls bowled	34,054
Wickets	589
Bowling average	19.69
5 wickets in innings	42
10 wickets in match	13
Best bowling	8/16
Catches/stumpings	63/0
- Source: CricketArchive

Padmakar Kashinath Shivalkar (14 September 1940 – 3 March 2025) was an Indian first class cricketer. A slow left-arm orthodox bowler, Shivalkar spent over 20 years playing for Bombay and is the team's highest wicket taker of all time. He was almost 50 when he retired. In 2016, he received the C. K. Nayudu Lifetime Achievement Award, the highest honour conferred by BCCI on a former player.

== Biography ==
Shivalkar was unlucky not to be selected for the Indian Test side, but his career coincided with that of Bishan Bedi. He toured Sri Lanka with a strong Indian side in 1973–74, playing in both matches against Sri Lanka and taking four wickets.

His best bowling figures came in the final of the Ranji Trophy in 1972–73, when he took 8 for 16 and 5 for 18 for Bombay against Tamil Nadu. In the previous season's semi-final he had taken 8 for 19 and 5 for 31 against Mysore.

Shivalkar studied at the Siddharth College of Arts, Science and Commerce in Fort, Mumbai.

A book written by Padmakar Shivalkar, Ha Chendu Daivagaticha has been published. Book was compiled by Shri Arun Ghadigaokar and published by Dimple Publication and Ananda yatri a group of friends of Shri Padmakar Shivalkar.

Shivalkar died in Mumbai on 3 March 2025, at the age of 84.The Indian team wore black armbands during its ICC Champions Trophy semifinal against Australia at the Dubai International Cricket Stadium on Tuesday, in tribute to Shivalkar.
