= Wasim Jaffer =

Indian cricketer

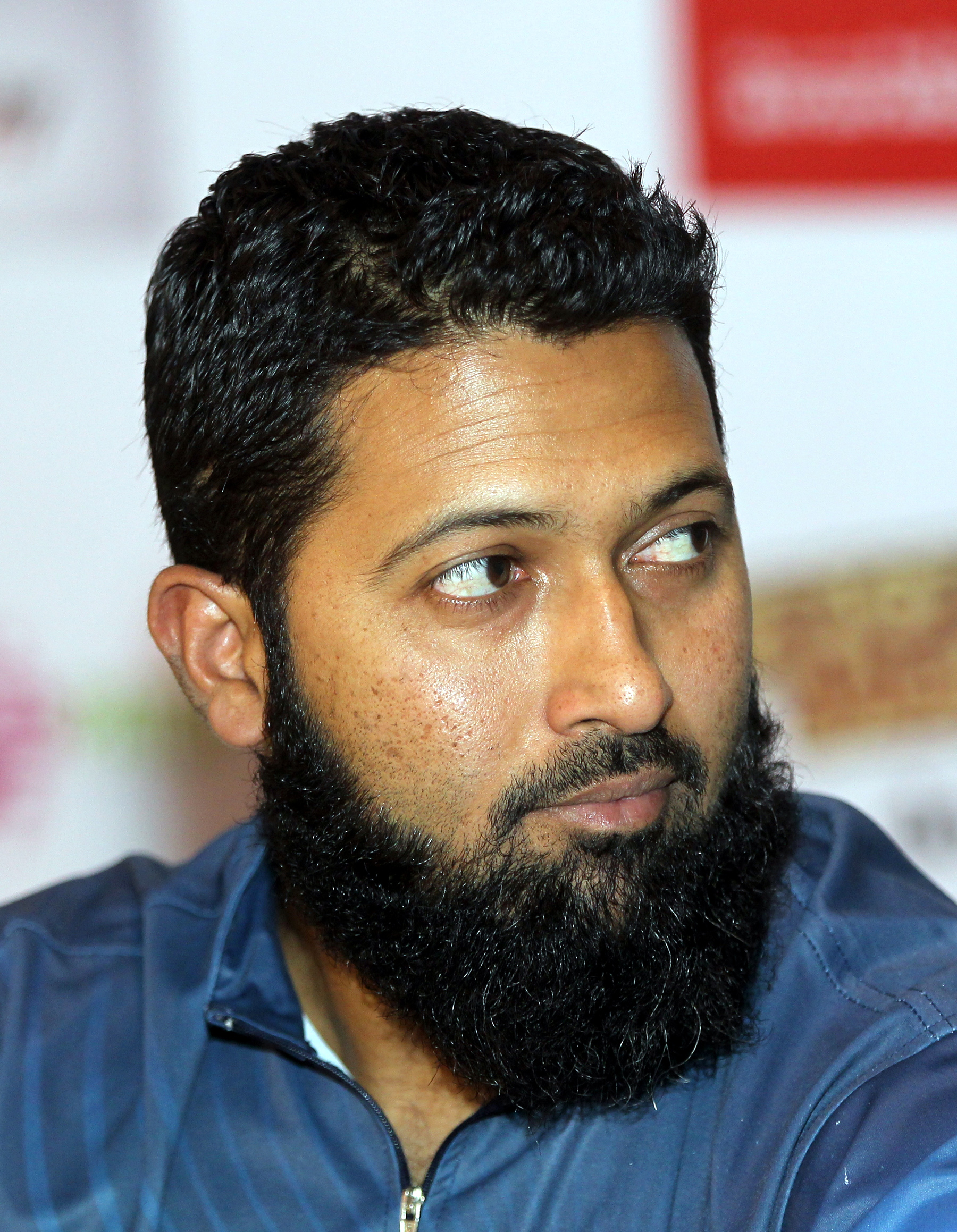
- Jaffer in 2012

Personal information
- Born: 16 February 1978 (age 48); Bombay, India
- Batting: Right-handed
- Bowling: Right-arm off break
- Role: Batsman
- Relatives: Armaan Jaffer (nephew)

International information
- National side: India (2000–2008)
- Test debut (cap 225): 24 February 2000 v South Africa
- Last Test: 11 April 2008 v South Africa
- ODI debut (cap 166): 22 November 2006 v South Africa
- Last ODI: 29 November 2006 v South Africa

Domestic team information
- Years: Team
- 1996/97–2014/15: Mumbai
- 2008–2009: Royal Challengers Bangalore (squad no. 10)
- 2015/16–2019/20: Vidarbha

Career statistics
Competition	Test	ODI	FC	LA
Matches	31	2	260	118
Runs scored	1,944	10	19,410	4,849
Batting average	34.10	5.00	50.67	44.08
100s/50s	5/11	0/0	57/91	10/33
Top score	212	10	314*	178*
Balls bowled	66	–	138	–
Wickets	2	–	2	–
Bowling average	9.00	–	37.00	–
5 wickets in innings	0	–	0	–
10 wickets in match	0	–	0	–
Best bowling	2/18	–	2/18	–
Catches/stumpings	27/–	0/–	297/–	45/–
- Source: ESPNcricinfo, 4 October 2020

Wasim Jaffer (born 16 February 1978) is a retired Indian professional cricketer. He was a right-handed opening batsman and an occasional right arm off-break bowler. In 2011 he became the highest run-scorer in Ranji Trophy cricket, surpassing Amol Muzumdar. In November 2018, he became the first batsman to score 11,000 runs in the competition. In January 2019, he became the most capped player in Ranji Trophy history with the appearance of his 146th match surpassing Madhya Pradesh's Devendra Bundela (145). He was appointed as batting coach for Bangladesh cricket team. In March 2020, he announced his retirement from all forms of cricket.

In June 2020, Jaffer was announced as the head coach of Uttarakhand for 2020–21 season. Citing "interference and bias" in the team selection, he stepped down in February 2021. In July 2021, he was appointed as head coach of Odisha for two years. Wasim Jaffer became Bangladesh U-19 cricket team's batting consultant.

== Early years ==
Following a prolific school career, including an innings of 400 not out as a 15-year-old, he made his entry into the first-class cricket and scored a triple-century in his second match. This innings of 314 not out helped set a series of firsts for Mumbai. It was the first occasion that a batsman had made a triple century for Mumbai away from home and, in putting on 459 runs with his opening partner Sulakshan Kulkarni, the pair became the first from Mumbai to pass 400. The Indian Express wrote, "Such was his temperament during the 675 minute stay that it was hard to believe he was playing only his second match. What was more praiseworthy was the youngster's ability to find gaps at will."

== Domestic career ==
Jaffer represented Scholes CC in the Huddersfield Drakes League for a number of seasons as their overseas player. For the 2010 season he moved a few miles down the road to Skelmanthorpe Cricket Club, and broke the league record for runs scored in a single season. In the 2011 season Jaffer signed to Himley CC in the Birmingham and District Premier League.

In his Test career, Jaffer scored five centuries, of which two were double-centuries. He has Test centuries against Pakistan, England, West Indies and South Africa.

As of the 2013 season Wasim Jaffer travelled to England where he played for Ainsdale CC in the LDCC league. Here he enjoyed a successful first half of the season scoring multiple centuries and had a strike rate of 97.93 and a top score of 153 not out. Injury curtailed his time at Ainsdale as he had to return home to India for an operation on his knee.

In June 2015, Jaffer switched to Vidarbha from 2015/16 Ranji season. On 1 January 2018, Vidarbha won Ranji Trophy and in the final against Delhi, Jaffer hit the winning boundary.

In November 2018, in the third round of the 2018–19 Ranji Trophy against Baroda, Jaffar became the first batsman to score 11,000 runs in the Ranji Trophy. The following month, in round seven of the tournament, he scored his 55th century in first-class cricket. Later the same month, he equalled the record for playing in the most matches in the Ranji Trophy, with 145. He was the leading run-scorer for Vidarbha in the group-stage of the 2018–19 Ranji Trophy, with 763 runs in eight matches. In the quarter-final match of the tournament, against Uttarakhand, he scored his 19,000th run in first-class cricket.

In the opening round of the 2019–20 Ranji Trophy, Jaffer became the first cricketer to play in 150 matches in the Ranji Trophy. On 7 March 2020, Jaffer retired from all formats of the game.

== International career ==
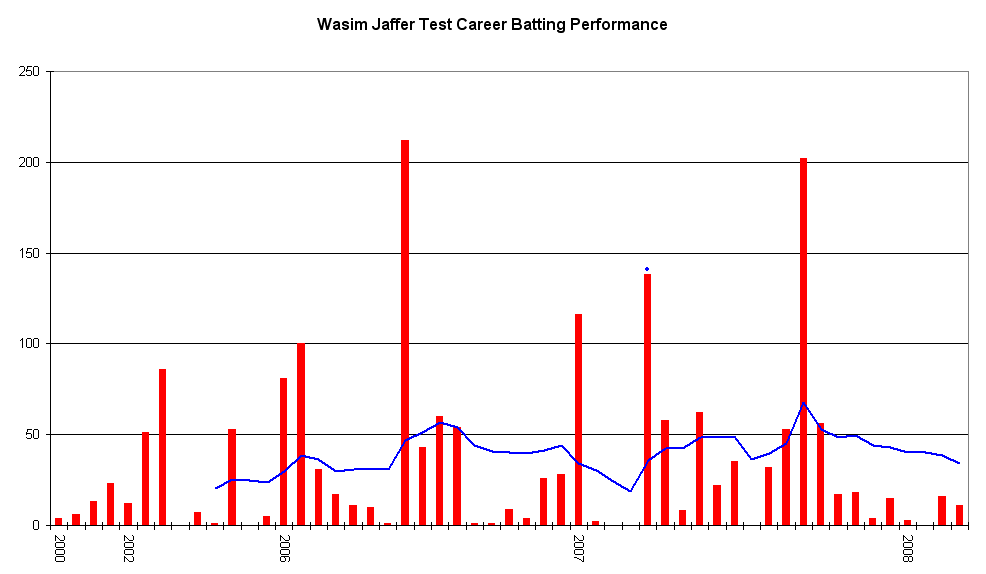
An innings-by-innings breakdown of Jaffer's Test match batting career, showing runs scored (red bars) and the average of the last ten innings (blue line).

An opening batsman, with the style of Mohammed Azharuddin, much was expected of Jaffer as he entered Test cricket for in a home series against South Africa in 2000. However, the experienced bowlers Shaun Pollock and Allan Donald proved too difficult for him to cope with, and he managed just 46 runs from his four innings. He would not start another international match for some time, eventually returning in May 2002 for a tour of the West Indies. Jaffer had a respectable series, making 51 in Bridgetown and 86 at Antigua. He had done enough to be included in the Indian squad for their tour of England the following summer but, despite a half century at Lord's, he struggled in his other innings and was dropped after two Tests.

Jaffer was recalled to the Test squad for the tour of Pakistan 2005–06 in the wake of excellent domestic form, but did not play in the Tests. It was in the next series in India that Jaffer scored his maiden Test century: exactly 100 against England at Nagpur, in his first Test since his recall.

He made his first Test double-century at the Antigua Recreation Ground against the West Indies in June 2006. His 212 was made in over 500 minutes during the second innings was the equal second highest by an Indian batsman in the Caribbean.

In July 2006, his position as India's first-choice opener with partner Virender Sehwag was confirmed via the award of a central contract (Grade C) by the Board of Control for Cricket in India.

Jaffer's ODI debut came in November 2006 against South Africa but he was unproductive and was immediately dropped. However, he continued to score in the Test format, making his third Test century against South Africa at Newlands.

Despite making a pair in the opening Test of his next series against Bangladesh at Chittagong, he returned to form with 138 in the following Test before retiring hurt.

Jaffer scored 202 in the first innings of the second Test of the 2007 series against Pakistan at Eden Gardens, Kolkata.
