= List of Mumbai cricketers =

List of first-class cricketers by club

This is an incomplete list in alphabetical order of cricketers who have played for Mumbai (formerly Bombay) in top-class (Note: Top-class matches are first-class, List A, and Twenty20.) matches since the club initially achieved first-class status in 1892.

== Key ==
- † preceding a player's name means that the original article is now a redirect to this list. Players in **bold** have played international cricket.

== A ==
- Iqbal Abdulla, 2006/07–2015/16
- Khan Abdulla, 1951/52
- Abu Abraham, 1955/56
- Sudhakar Adhikari, 1959/60–1966/67
- **Ajit Agarkar**, 1996/97–2012/13
- Badre Alam, 2014/15–2015/16
- Mohini Amladi, 1951/52–1952/53
- Vasant Amladi, 1947/48–1949/50
- **Pravin Amre**, 1986/87–1998/99
- Hoshang Amroliwala, 1956/57–1963/64
- **Salil Ankola**, 1990/91–1996/97
- S. Anwar, 1938/39
- **Anwar Hussain**, 1943/44–1945/46 (played international cricket for Pakistan)
- **Arvind Apte**, 1957/58–1964/65
- **Madhav Apte**, 1951/52–1967/68
- Sheshil Arolkar, 1941/42
- Kiran Asher, 1968/69–1977/78

== B ==
- Harmeet Singh Baddhan, 2009/10–2015/16
- **Sairaj Bahutule**, 1991/92–2008/09
- Ranjan Baindoor, 1975/76–1984/85
- Shamsher Baloch, 1946/47
- Subhash Bandiwadekar, 1973/74–1976/77
- Ahmed Baporia, 1934/35–1937/38
- Maganlal Bhagwandas, 1934/35–1935/36
- A. K. Bhalerao, 1941/42
- Zubin Bharucha, 1992/93–1995/96
- Vijay Bhosle, 1967/68–1970/71
- Jitendra Bhutta, 1968/69
- Jay Bista, 2014/15–2015/16
- Vishwanath Bondre, 1965/66–1969/70
- **Chandu Borde**, 1954/55

== C ==
- Nariman Canteenwala, 1936/37–1937/38
- Raghunath Chandorkar, 1950/51
- Mrudul Chaturvedi, 1984/85
- Ankeet Chavan, 2007/08–2012/13
- HE Cheetham, 1902/03
- Siddharth Chitnis, 2009/10–2015/16
- Padmakar Chury, 1934/35
- Frederick Clarke, 1892/93
- **Sorabji Colah**, 1926/27–1933/34
- Hormasji Contractor, 1934/35–1935/36
- Hoshedar Contractor, 1982/83
- Rustom Cooper, 1943/44–1944/45
- Edward Cox, 1892/93

== D ==
- Vishal Dabholkar, 2012/13–2015/16
- H. M. Dadachanji, 1953/54
- Prathamesh Dake, 2013/14–2014/15
- Madhav Dalvi, 1947/48–1959/60
- Madhukar Dalvi, 1952/53
- Amit Dani, 1995/96–2001/02
- **Bal Dani**, 1954/55
- Avi D'Avoine, 1934/35
- John Davy, 1902/03
- Suresh Deobakht, 1971/72
- Avinash Desai, 1952/53–1957/58
- Prasad Desai, 1989/90–1992/93
- **Ramakant Desai**, 1958/59–1968/69
- Tushar Deshpande, 2014/15
- † Aditya Dhumal, 2016/17
- Patrick Dickinson, 1947/48–1948/49
- **Sameer Dighe**, 1990/91–2001/02
- Ajay Divecha, 1962/63
- **Ramesh Divecha**, 1951/52
- K. N. Divekar, 1934/35–1936/37
- Sharad Diwadkar, 1957/58–1966/67
- S. S. Dongree, 1934/35
- Peter Dowson, 1937/38
- John du Cane, 1892/93
- Shivam Dubey, 2015/16

== E ==
- **Farokh Engineer**, 1959/60–1974/75
- Maneck Engineer, 1941/42
- Ashok Eshwalkar, 1985/86

== F ==
- Leonard Furber, 1902/03

== G ==
- Ravi Gadiyar, 1994/95
- Edulji Gai, 1934/35
- B. K. Garudachar, 1943/44
- **Sunil Gavaskar**, 1967/68–1986/87
- Mazhar Ghadially, 1993/94
- **Karsan Ghavri**, 1973/74–1981/82
- Shankarrao Godambe, 1926/27–1939/40
- VV Godbole, 1964/65
- Aakarshit Gomel, 2019/20
- Behram Govadia, 1950/51–1961/62
- John Greig, 1902/03
- **Ghulam Guard**, 1947/48–1961/62
- **Baloo Gupte**, 1953/54–1967/68
- Gurudut Gupte, 1980/81
- **Subhash Gupte**, 1948/49–1958/59
- Omkar Gurav, 2007/08–2011/12
- Rajesh Gurav, 1992/93

== H ==
- Abdul Hakim, 1933/34–1941/42
- Mahendra Hansoti, 1935/36
- **Manohar Hardikar**, 1955/56–1967/68
- Shishir Hattangadi, 1981/82–1991/92
- Saeed Hatteea, 1969/70–1970/71
- Dadabhoy Havewala, 1934/35–1941/42
- J. P. Havewala, 1933/34
- Sharad Hazare, 1964/65–1976/77
- Swapnil Hazare, 2000/01–2006/07
- Salebhoy Heptullah, 1934/35
- Akhil Herwadkar, 2011/12–2015/16
- **Dattaram Hindlekar**, 1934/35–1946/47
- Reginald Hopkins, 1935/36
- Bernard Howlett, 1926/27

== I ==
- **K. C. Ibrahim**, 1940/41–1949/50
- Vinit Indulkar, 2004/05–2013/14
- Behram Irani, 1946/47–1952/53
- Mehli Irani, 1951/52–1953/54
- Rustom Irani, 1941/42
- Abdul Ismail, 1969/70–1977/78
- Shreyas Iyer, 2013/14–2015/16

== J ==
- Rajendra Jadeja, 1978/79–1979/80
- Deepak Jadhav, 1982/83–1987/88
- Jayaprakash Jadhav, 1990/91–1991/92
- Pushkaraj Jadhav, 1999/00–2003/04
- Sanjeev Jadhav, 1989/90
- **Wasim Jaffer**, 1996/97–2014/15
- **Laxmidas Jai**, 1926/27–1941/42
- Ankush Jaiswal, 2015/16
- **Rustomji Jamshedji**, 1926/27–1935/36
- Sanjay Jaywant, 1975/76–1976/77
- Manoj Joglekar, 1992/93–2003/04
- Henry John, 1902/03
- S. S. Joshi, 1933/34

== K ==
- S. M. Kadri, 1935/36–1941/42
- Bomanji Kalapesi, 1926/27–1936/37
- Prabhakar Kamat, 1952/53–1959/60
- **Vinod Kambli**, 1989/90–2004/05
- Shriram Kannan, 1999/00–2000/01
- Bahadur Kapadia, 1926/27
- Framroze Kapadia, 1934/35
- Hansraj Kapadia, 1950/51
- Mahesh Karanjkar, 1992/93–1995/96
- Vijay Karkhanis, 1967/68–1968/69
- Avinash Karnik, 1974/75–1977/78
- Bharat Karnik, 1994/95
- Pradeep Kasliwal, 1985/86–1988/89
- Laxman Kenny, 1938/39–1941/42
- **Ramnath Kenny**, 1950/51–1960/61
- Badruddin Khan
- Iqbal Khan, 1986/87–1994/95
- Javed Khan, 2010/11–2014/15
- Sarfaraz Khan, 2013/14–2014/15
- **Zaheer Khan**, 2006/07–2013/14
- Shreyas Khanolkar, 1999/00
- Onkar Khanwilkar, 2003/04–2010/11
- Sachin Khartade, 1994/95
- Aniruddha Kher, 1987/88–1988/89
- Jehangir Khot, 1935/36–1950/51
- Gopal Kohli, 1970/71
- D. V. Koppikar, 1938/39
- Janardan Kore, 1944/45–1947/48
- J. Kotian, 1950/51
- Sharma Krishnan, 1990/91
- Subhash Kshirsagar, 1979/80–1988/89
- Sahil Kukreja, 2005/06–2010/11
- **Dhawal Kulkarni**, 2006/07–2015/16
- **Nilesh Kulkarni**, 1994/95–2007/08
- **Raju Kulkarni**, 1982/83–1992/93
- Ravi Kulkarni, 1978/79–1989/90
- Sulakshan Kulkarni, 1986/87–1998/99
- **Umesh Kulkarni**, 1963/64–1968/69
- **Abey Kuruvilla**, 1990/91–1999/00

== L ==
- Siddhesh Lad, 2012/13–2015/16
- Abdul Latif, 1948/49
- J. S. Lawyer, 1937/38
- Rajendra Lele, 1985/86–1987/88
- Vishwanath Lele, 1953/54–1968/69
- Sunil Limaye, 1986/87–1989/90
- Harry Lowis, 1902/03
- Charles Luard, 1892/93

== M ==
- Vishal Mahadik, 1993/94–1997/98
- **Ebrahim Maka**, 1944/45–1946/47
- Usman Malvi, 2002/03–2010/11
- Shridhar Mandale, 1979/80–1984/85
- Vinayak Mane, 2000/01–2008/09
- Mun Mangela, 2006/07–2010/11
- Shrideep Mangela, 2014/15–2015/16
- Sushant Manjrekar, 1999/00–2002/03
- **Sanjay Manjrekar**, 1984/85–1997/98
- **Vijay Manjrekar**, 1949/50–1955/56
- **Ashok Mankad**, 1963/64–1982/83
- **Vinoo Mankad**, 1951/52–1955/56
- Rahul Mankad, 1975/76–1984/85
- **Madhav Mantri**, 1941/42–1956/57
- Sushant Marathe, 2005/06–2014/15
- **Khershed Meherhomji**, 1933/34
- Atul Mehta, 1969/70–1971/72
- Champaklal Mehta, 1933/34–1935/36
- Uday Merchant, 1939/40–1949/50
- **Vijay Merchant**, 1933/34–1950/51
- Jack Meyer, 1926/27
- **Paras Mhambrey**, 1992/93–2002/03
- John Milne, 1902/03
- Mermadi Mistry, 1937/38–1943/44
- **Rusi Modi**, 1943/44–1957/58
- Urmikant Mody, 1975/76
- Vijay Mohanraj, 1975/76–1977/78
- MM Mohiuddin, 1947/48–1950/51
- Kiran Mokashi, 1980/81–1990/91
- Kunal More, 2001/02
- Shankar More, 1964/65–1966/67
- Sunil More, 1992/93–1997/98
- Robin Morris, 1996/97–2006/07
- Robert Moss, 1937/38–1939/40
- Wilkin Mota, 2003/04–2014/15
- Behram Mowadala, 1949/50–1950/51
- Murtuza Hussain, 2007/08–2011/12
- Amol Muzumdar, 1993/94–2008/09

== N ==
- **Bapu Nadkarni**, 1960/61–1967/68
- Bharat Nadkarni, 1978/79
- Ramesh Nagdev, 1964/65
- Ajit Naik, 1970/71–1973/74
- Manohar Naik, 1938/39–1940/41
- Prashant Naik, 2006/07–2011/12
- **Sudhir Naik**, 1966/67–1977/78
- Framroze Nariman, 1937/38–1939/40
- Bharat Narvekar, 1965/66
- Sujit Nayak, 2013/14
- **Suru Nayak**, 1976/77–1988/89
- **Abhishek Nayar**, 2003/04–2015/16
- Saurabh Netravalkar, 2013/14–2014/15
- Arthur Newnham, 1892/93

== P ==
- Amit Pagnis, 1996/97–1999/00
- **Ajit Pai**, 1968/69–1975/76
- Karkulu Pai, 1958/59–1962/63
- **Phiroze Palia**, 1937/38
- Yeshwant Palwankar, 1944/45–1954/55
- **Chandrakant Pandit**, 1979/80–1990/91
- Kamalkar Panjri, 1953/54–1957/58
- **Jatin Paranjpe**, 1991/92–2000/01
- Vasudev Paranjpe, 1961/62–1965/66
- **Ghulam Parkar**, 1978/79–1985/86
- **Ramnath Parkar**, 1970/71–1980/81
- Zulfiqar Parkar, 1977/78–1984/85
- Akash Parkar, 2014/15
- Vazirani Parsram, 1949/50
- **Chandrakant Patankar**, 1949/50–1965/66
- Babubhai Patel, 1935/36
- Bhavesh Patel, 2007/08
- Minoo Patel, 1937/38–1939/40
- **Munaf Patel**, 2003/04–2004/05
- Pravin Shyama Salian, 2000–2004
- Madhusudan Patil, 1949/50–1952/53
- Nikhil Patil, 2012/13–2015/16
- **Sandeep Patil**, 1975/76–1986/87
- Sanjay Patil, 1989/90–1993/94
- Vithal Patil, 1956/57–1957/58
- Nilesh Patwardhan, 2002/03
- Kaustubh Pawar, 2011/12–2013/14
- Rajesh Pawar, 1996/97–2002/03
- Akbar Peerbhoy, 1937/38
- Dudley Pelham, 1902/03
- **Dattu Phadkar**, 1944/45–1951/52
- Mandar Phadke, 1995/96–1999/00
- **Robert Poore**, 1892/93 (played international cricket for South Africa)
- Kiran Powar, 1996/97–2000/01
- **Ramesh Powar**, 1999/00–2012/13
- H. A. Printer, 1937/38

== R ==
- Vinod Raghavan, 1994/95
- **Ajinkya Rahane**, 2006/07–2015/16
- Madan Raiji, 1941/42–1948/49
- Vasant Raiji, 1941/42
- Ernest Raikes, 1892/93
- Rohan Raje, 2007/08–2015/16
- **Vijay Rajindernath**, 1952/53
- **Lalchand Rajput**, 1982/83–1990/91
- **Gulabrai Ramchand**, 1948/49–1962/63
- Atul Ranade, 1996/97–1997/98
- Amol Rane, 1999/00–2000/01
- **Khandu Rangnekar**, 1940/41–1948/49
- Sharad Rao, 1980/81
- Ghulam Rasool, 1926/27
- Abhishek Raut, 2008/09–2015/16
- Milind Rege, 1967/68–1977/78
- Yatin Rele, 1953/54–1957/58
- Anup Revandkar, 2007/08–2012/13
- Grimley Richards, 1934/35–1936/37
- **Pankaj Roy**, 1954/55

== S ==
- Anup Sabnis, 1987/88–1989/90
- **Aavishkar Salvi**, 2001/02–2012/13
- Vinayak Samant, 2002/03–2009/10
- Mahesh Sampat, 1970/71–1975/76
- **Balwinder Sandhu**, 1980/81–1986/87
- Balwinder Sandhu, 2008/09–2015/16
- Jignesh Sanghani, 1982/83–1988/89
- Sushil Sanghvi, 1967/68–1968/69
- **Dilip Sardesai**, 1960/61–1972/73
- **Chandu Sarwate**, 1943/44
- Ajit Sawant, 1982/83–1987/88
- Sachin Sawant, 2000/01
- Santosh Saxena, 1997/98–2000/01
- Hiken Shah, 2005/06–2014/15
- Vignesh Shahane, 1991/92–1992/93
- Aquib Shaikh, 2010/11
- Faisal Shaikh, 1997/98
- Rahil Shaikh, 2008/09–2009/10
- Shoaib Shaikh, 2009/10–2014/15
- Sufiyan Shaikh, 2014/15
- SV Shankar, 1953/54–1954/55
- **Rohit Sharma**, 2006/07–2015/16
- **Ravi Shastri**, 1979/80–1993/94
- Devdas Shenoy, 1961/62
- Bravish Shetty, 2011/12–2014/15
- Nishit Shetty, 2000/01–2006/07
- Suresh Shetty, 1982/83–1985/86
- Abhijit Shetye, 2000/01–2005/06
- **Sadu Shinde**, 1950/51–1954/55
- Santosh Shinde, 2004/05–2005/06
- Raju Shirke, 1990/91
- Nitin Shirodkar, 1967/68
- Padmakar Shivalkar, 1964/65–1987/88
- Yeshwant Sidhaye, 1954/55
- Reginald Sinclair, 1902/03
- Shashank Singh, 2014/15–2015/16
- Sidak Singh, 2014/15
- Alan Sippy, 1984/85–1990/91
- **Ranga Sohoni**, 1951/52–1954/55
- **Eknath Solkar**, 1966/67–1981/82
- Piyush Soneji, 1990/91–1992/93
- Frederick Sprott, 1902/03
- Sankaran Srinivasan, 1978/79
- **Charlie Stayers**, 1962/63 (played international cricket for West Indies)
- Herbert Stockdale, 1892/93
- Doraiswamy Subramanian, 2012/13–2013/14
- **Gundibail Sunderam**, 1953/54–1955/56
- M. G. Surti, 1934/35
- Rajesh Sutar, 1994/95–2001/02
- Suryansh Shedge, 2024–

== T ==
- Dinkar Talpade, 1933/34–1937/38
- Sameer Talpade, 1988/89–1992/93
- Pravin Tambe, 2013/14–2015/16
- Milind Tamhane, 2002/03
- **Naren Tamhane**, 1953/54–1963/64
- Rakesh Tandon, 1972/73–1977/78
- **Keki Tarapore**, 1937/38–1948/49
- Aditya Tare, 2007/08–2015/16
- S. D. Telang, 1949/50
- **Sachin Tendulkar**, 1988/89–2013/14
- Bhavin Thakkar, 2001/02–2007/08
- Ravindra Thakkar, 1981/82–1989/90
- Jitendra Thakre, 1986/87–1988/89
- Rahul Thakur, 2003/04–2004/05
- Shardul Thakur, 2012/13–2015/16
- Suresh Tigdi, 1969/70–1970/71
- Subash Tipnis, 1963/64
- John Trask, 1892/93
- Francis Travers, 1926/27
- Herbert Trevor, 1892/93
- Sagar Trivedi, 2014/15–2015/16
- Hugh Troup, 1892/93

== U ==
- **Polly Umrigar**, 1946/47–1962/63
- Thomas Usborne, 1892/93

== V ==
- Hormasji Vajifdar, 1926/27–1935/36
- Paul Valthaty, 2005/06–2010/11
- Arun Varde, 1963/64–1967/68
- Amitabh Velaskar, 2002/03
- **Dilip Vengsarkar**, 1975/76–1991/92
- Rajesh Verma, 2002/03–2012/13

== W ==
- **Ajit Wadekar**, 1958/59–1974/75
- Jal Wadia, 1934/35
- Raghunath Wadkar, 1934/35–1938/39
- Praful Waghela, 2004/05–2012/13
- Kshemal Waingankar, 2006/07–2014/15
- Vishwas Walawalkar, 1994/95
- WS Walcott, 1902/03

== Y ==
- Suryakumar Yadav, 2009/10–2024/25
- Anand Yalvigi, 1996/97
- Vikrant Yeligati, 2007/08–2010/11

== Z ==
- Avadhut Zarapkar, 1974/75–1979/80
