= BCCI Corporate Trophy =

Cricket tournament

- Countries: India
- Administrator: BCCI
- Format: Limited-overs
- First edition: 2009
- Tournament format: Round-robin then knockout
- Number of teams: 12
- Current champion: Air India Red
- Most successful: Air India Red (1 title)

The BCCI Corporate Trophy was an Indian cricket competition. It was established in 2009 by the Board of Control for Cricket in India (BCCI) as a 12-team inter-corporate tournament beginning at the start of the Indian cricket season before the start of the Ranji Trophy competition. This tournament was a 50-over a side tournament involving corporate teams. All the top Indian cricketers were expected to play along with academy cricket players and those who play regular domestic cricket in India.

== History ==
The corporate trophy acted as a high-profile starter to the Indian domestic cricket season. The BCCI's prime objective was to promote employment opportunities for domestic cricketers in India's corporate houses. The board invited 12 corporate teams to take part which involved some of India's top cricketers.

The winners collected ₹ 10 million (US$204,272) while the runners-up received ₹ 5 million (US$102,109) however, unlike the Indian Premier League (IPL) no foreign players took part.

The tournament initially involved players formerly from the now-defunct Indian Cricket League (ICL). Some of the ICL players said that after the announcement of the Corporate Trophy, they had received calls from their employers asking them to cut ties with the rebel league.

The inaugural tournament was won by Air India Red after they beat Air India Blue by 93 runs in the final.

The last edition of the competition was in 2014, the BCCI cited the difficulty of scheduling it in a full cricket calendar as the reason future editions did not take place.

== 2014 teams ==
=== Group A ===
- Andhra Bank: Arjun Yadav (c), Shoaib Ahmed, Neeraj Bist, Mohammed Khader, Abhinav Kumar, Sarvesh Kumar, Lalith Mohan, Pagadala Naidu, Dwaraka Ravi Teja, Ashish Reddy, Naveen Reddy, Ronald Roy Rodrigues, Amol Shinde, Hanuma Vihari
- Chemplast: Hemanth Kumar (c), Mayank Agarwal, V Ashwin, Robin Bist, Piyush Chawla, Napoleon Einstein, H Gopinath, Rajamani Jesuraj, Prasanth Parameswaran, Murthy Prabhu, P Sakthi, Rajagopal Sathish, Sandeep Sharma, Gowjith Subhash, Rangaraj Suthesh, Murali Vijay
- Income Tax Department: Amol Ubarhande (c), Subramanian Anand, Ajitesh Argal, Sangram Atitkar, Puneet Bisht, Aniket Choudhary, Rohit Dahiya, Jay Desai, Vaibhav Deshpande, Ashish Hooda, Ravi Jangid, Amol Jungade, Iresh Saxena, Bhavik Thaker, Aditya Waghmode
- Indian Oil Corporation: Rajesh Pawar (c), Syed Abbas Ali, Amit Dani, Murtuza Hussain, Paresh Patel, Mandar Phadke, Rohan Raje, Balwinder Sandhu, Pinal Shah, Ravikant Shukla, Vikrant Yeligati

=== Group B ===
- Comptroller and Auditor General: Jalaj Saxena (c), Imtiyaz Ahmed, Sachin Baby, Avi Barot, Ankur Julka, Rameez Khan, Ankit Lamba, Bibhudutta Panda, Biplab Samantray, Saurya Sanandiya, Aditya Sarwate, Bravish Shetty, Rituraj Singh, Arpit Vasavada, Shrikant Wagh
- Madras Rubber Factory: Yaleeka Gnaneswara Rao (c), Varun Aaron, Srikkanth Anirudha, Prashanth Chandran, Yalaka Venugopal Rao, Sunil Sam, Thalaivan Sargunam, Sridharan Sriram, Umashankar Sushil, Sandeep Warrier
- Oil & Natural Gas Corporation: Unmukt Chand (c), Amit Bhandari, Prashant Bhandari, Gautam Gambhir, Praveen Kumar, Saurabh Kumar, Vikramjeet Malik, Mithun Manhas, Sumit Narwal, Ajay Ratra, Sandeep Sharma, Suhail Sharma, Tanmay Srivastava
- State Bank of Travancore: Vinan Nair (c), Pallam Anfal, Perumparambath Anthaf, K Chandrasekhara, Sony Cheruvathur, Raiphi Gomez, VA Jagadeesh, Vinod Kumar (cricketer), Abhishek Mohan, Kevin Oscar, Karimuttathu Rakesh, S Ramakrishnan, Chovvakkaran Shahid, Kanakkatharaparambu Sreejith, Chandra Tejas

=== Group C ===
- Bharat Petroleum Corporation Limited: Suryakumar Yadav (c), Kiran Adhav, Swapnil Hazare, Vinit Indulkar, Uday Kaul, Onkar Khanvilkar, Abhishek Nayar, Saurabh Netravalkar, Pragyan Ojha, Manish Pandey,Adarsh Dubey lkoAnup Revandkar, Aavishkar Salvi, Bhavin Thakkar, Rajesh Verma
- Bharat Sanchar Nigam Limited: Joginder Singh (c), Sanjay Bamel, Niranjan Behera, Kuldeep Diwan, Satish Kumar, Kamlesh Makvana, Rohit Mehra, NS Negi, Bikas Pati, Sourav Sarkar, Sumeet Sharma, Brijesh Tomar
- Canara Bank: Neravanda Aiyappa (c), Rajoo Bhatkal, G Chaitra, Bharat Chipli, Deepak Chougule, Sunil Joshi, Mansur Ali Khan, David Mathias, Srinivasa Murthy, KB Pawan, C Raghu, B Rajashekhar, Ravikumar Samarth
- State Bank of Hyderabad: Tirumalasetti Suman (c), Alfred Absolem, Akash Bhandari, Khushal Jilla, Ravi Kiran, Pawan Kumar, Daniel Manohar, Anoop Pai, Syed Quadri, Vishal Sharma, Anirudh Singh, M. Srinivas, Bodapati Sumanth, Ashwin Yadav

=== Group D ===
- Air India: Yuvraj Singh (c), Rajat Bhatia, Manvinder Bisla, Royston Dias, Sushant Marathe, Naman Ojha, RG Pal, Rashmi Parida, Sachin Rana, Sonu Sharma, Pankaj Singh, Paul Valthaty
- Tata Sports Club: Ajit Agarkar (c), Saurabh Tiwary, Mandeep Singh, Sufiyan Shaikh, Satish Gaikwad, Usman Malvi, Arya Moheet, Gaurav Jathar, Ramesh Powar, Nikhil Patil, Shardul Thakur,
- India Cements: Dinesh Karthik (c), Baba Aparajith, Palani Amarnath, Subramaniam Badrinath, Lakshmipathy Balaji, Baba Indrajith, Arun Karthik, Suresh Kumar, Abhinav Mukund, Ramaswamy Prasanna, Rahil Shah, Yo Mahesh
- State Bank of Mysore: Balachandra Akhil (c), Kayan Abbas, Sreenath Aravind, KC Avinash, Pavan Deshpande, Aniruddha Joshi, Anand Katti, MK Manjunath, Syed Nooruddin, C Sasikumar, HS Sharath, Chethan William

== 2009 tournament ==
The 1st round takes place from 1–3 September with the 12 teams split into 4 groups of 3. The group winners will play in semi-finals on 5 and 7 September and the final being played on 8 September. The winners will receive Rs 10 million with the runners-up receiving Rs 5 million.

Air India Red won the tournament by beating Air India Blue by 93 runs in the final.

=== Group stages ===
==== Group A ====
Team	Pts	Pld	W	L	NR	NRR
Air India Blue	7	2	1	0	1	+3.405
India Revenue	3	2	1	1	0	-1.489
ITC	2	2	0	1	1	-0.120

1 September 2009
Scorecard

Air India Blue	v	ITC

Match abandoned without a ball bowled
Punjab CA Stadium, Mohali, India
Umpires: Sudhir Asnani and Sanjay Hazare (both IND)

- Groundstaff announced that due to heavy overnight rain in Mohali, the pitch was not playable because of a wet outfield.

2 September 2009
Scorecard

India Revenue; 255/8 (50 overs)	v	ITC; 249/9 (50 overs)
Avik Chowdhury 110 (158); Mohammed Abid Khan 2/52 (10 overs)		Mohit Sharma 61 (76); Ajinkya Joshi 4/54 (10 overs)

India Revenue won by 6 runs
Punjab CA Stadium, Mohali, India
Umpires: Sanjay Hazre and Sanjeeva Rao (both IND)

3 September 2009
Scorecard

Air India Blue; 362/1 (42 overs)	v	India Revenue; 222/8 (42 overs)
Manvinder Bisla 152 (113); Rakesh Bhadrapur 1/60 (9 overs)		Ameya Srikhande 121 (119); R. P. Singh 2/24 (5 overs)

Air India Blue won by 143 runs (VJD Method)
Punjab CA Stadium. Mohali, India
Umpires: Sudhir Asnani and Sanjeeva Rao (both IND)

- Match reduced to 42 overs a side

==== Group B ====
Team	Pts	Pld	W	L	NR	NRR
Oil & Natural Gas	7	2	1	0	1	+1.420
MRF	3	2	1	1	0	-0.752
Bharat Petroleum	2	2	0	1	1	-0.421

1 September 2009
Scorecard

Bharat Petroleum; 120/6 (28.3 overs)	v	MRF; 191/all out (48.4 overs)
Anup Revandkar 35 (55); Pandian Dharma 3/22 (7 overs)		Gnaneswara Rao 53 (74); Aavishkar Salvi 3/37 (9 overs)

MRF won by 12 runs (VJD Method)
ACA-VDCA Stadium, Visakhapatnam, India
Umpires: Shashank Ranade and Suresh Shastri (both IND)

- Bharat Petroleum Corporation were set 133 from 28.3 overs

2 September 2009
Scorecard

MRF; 258/9 (50 overs)	v	Oil & Natural Gas; 329/9 (50 overs)
Sridharan Sriram 108 (104); Munaf Patel 3/48 (10 overs)		Gagan Khoda 105 (103); Pandian Dharma 5/75 (8 overs)

Oil & Natural Gas won by 71 runs
ACA-VDCA Stadium, Visakhapatnam, India
Umpires: Suresh Shastri and Madanmohan Singh (both IND)

3 September 2009
Scorecard

Bharat Petroleum	v	Oil & Natural Gas

Match abandoned without a ball bowled
ACA-VDCA Stadium, Visakhapatnam, India
Umpires: Shashank Ranade and Madanmohan Singh (both IND)

==== Group C ====
Team	Pts	Pld	W	L	NR	NRR
Tata Sports Club	7	2	1	0	1	+1.972
Indian Oil	4	2	0	0	2	0
AIPSSPB	1	2	0	1	1	-1.972

1 September 2009
Scorecard

AIPSSPB; 168/all out (35.4 overs)	v	Tata Sports Club; 241/8 (36 overs)
Pankaj Thakur 50 (52); Ajit Agarkar 2/6 (5 overs)		Rohan Gavaskar 93 (87); Rajinder Bisht 2/37 (5 overs)

Tata SC won by 73 runs
HPCA Stadium, Dharamsala, India
Umpires: Krishna Hariharan and Amiesh Saheba (both IND)

- Match Reduced to 36 overs a side

2 September 2009
Scorecard

AIPSSPB	v	Indian Oil

Match abandoned without a ball bowled
HPCA Stadium, Dharamsala, India
Umpires: Rajesh Deshpandey and Amiesh Saheba (both IND)

3 September 2009
Scorecard

Indian Oil	v	Tata Sports Club

Match abandoned without a ball bowled
HPCA Stadium, Dharamsala, India
Umpires: Rajesh Deshpandey and Krishna Hariharan (both IND)

==== Group D ====
Team	Pts	Pld	W	L	NR	NRR
Air India Red	6	2	1	0	1	+0.504
India Cements	4	1	1	15	0	+0u.032
Bharat Sanchar Nigam	2	2	0	1	1	-0.532

1 September 2009
Scorecard

Air India Red; 16/1 (2.5 overs)	v	Bharat Sanchar Nigam; 258/7 (50 overs)
Suresh Raina 10 (9); Joginder Singh 1/7 (1.5 overs)		Arindam Das 82 (107); Saurabh Netravalkar 2/22 (7 overs)

No Result
M. Chinnaswamy Stadium, Bangalore, India
Umpires: S Ravi and Shavir Tarapore (both IND)

- Rain in Bangalore caused the match to be abandoned 2.5 overs into the Air India Red innings

2 September 2009
Scorecard

Bharat Sanchar Nigam; 228/9 (47 overs)	v	India Cements; 253/5 (47 overs)
Anshul Kapoor 51 (72); Hemang Badani 2/26 (7 overs)		Subramaniam Badrinath 90 (108); Niranjan Behera 2/37 (6 overs)

India Cements won by 25 runs
M. Chinnaswamy Stadium, Bangalore, India
Umpires: Ulhas Gandhe and Shavir Tarapore (both IND)

- Match reduced to 47 overs a side

3 September 2009
Scorecard

Air India Red; 244/3 (43 overs)	v	India Cements; 243/9 (47 overs)
Suresh Raina 92 (107); Sudeep Tyagi 2/46 (9 overs)		Subramaniam Badrinath 91 (110); Saurabh Netravalkar 3/48 (9 overs)

Air India Red won by 7 wickets
M. Chinnaswamy Stadium, Bangalore, India
Umpires: Ulhas Gandhe and S Ravi (both IND)

- Match reduce to 47 overs aside

=== Knockout stages ===
==== Semi-finals ====
5 September 2009
Scorecard

Air India Red; 215/5 (40 overs)	v	Oil & Natural Gas; 213/all out (48 overs)
Sushant Marathe 80* (106); Sarandeep Singh 2/36 (10 overs)		Gautam Gambhir 63 (75); Dhawal Kulkarni 3/40 (10 overs)

Air India Red won by 5 wickets
M.Chinnaswamy Stadium, Bangalore, India
Umpires: Subroto Das and Shavir Tarapore (both IND)

6 September 2009
Scorecard

Air India Blue; 247/5 (43.2 overs)	v	Tata Sports Club; 267/all out (49.4 overs)
Chandan Madan 114 (129); Ramesh Powar 2/56 (9 overs)		Nishit Shetty 63 (82); Pankaj Singh 4/41 (10 overs)

Air India Blue won by 5 wickets
PCA stadium, Mohali, India
Umpires: Sudhir Asnani and Sanjay Hazare (both IND)

- Floodlight failure 27.5 overs (154/1) into the Air India Blue innings caused delay. Air India Blue's target was then revised to 246 from 45 overs

==== Final ====
8 September 2009
Scorecard

Air India Red; 284/8 (50 overs)	v	Air India Blue; 191/all out (41.5 overs)
Robin Uthappa 157 (148); Harbhajan Singh 4/55 (10 overs)		Chandan Madan 85 (126); Yuvraj Singh 3/30 (10 overs)

Air India Red won by 93 runs
M. Chinnaswamy Stadium, Bangalore, India
Umpires: Amiesh Saheba and Shavir Tarapore (both IND)
