= 2004 Under-19 Cricket World Cup squads =

Sixteen members of the International Council (ICC) fielded teams at the 2004 Under-19 Cricket World Cup in Bangladesh. One team, Uganda, was making its debut.

== Australia ==
Coach: (Australia) Bennett King

- Tim Paine (c, wk)
- Ahillen Beadle
- Scott Coyte
- Adam Crosthwaite (wk)
- Theo Doropoulos
- Matthew Harrison
- Moises Henriques
- Cameron Huckett
- Josh Mangan
- Steve O'Keefe
- Lachlan Oswald-Jacobs
- Gary Putland
- Ken Skewes
- Shane Wallace

Source: Rediff

== Bangladesh ==
Coach: (Australia) Richard McInnes

- Ashiqur Rahman (c)
- Abul Bashar
- Aftab Ahmed
- Dhiman Ghosh
- Enamul Haque
- Mahmudullah Riyad
- Nadif Chowdhury
- Naeem Islam
- Nafees Iqbal
- Nazimuddin
- Nazmul Hossain
- Rubaiyat Huq (wk)
- Shahadat Hossain
- Talha Jubair

Source: Rediff

== Canada ==
Coach: (Canada) Franklyn Dennis

- Umar Bhatti (c)
- Soham Anjaria
- Adam Baksh
- Gavin Bastiampillai
- Trevin Bastiampillai
- Kenneth Carto (wk)
- Karun Jethi
- Aabid Keshvani
- Shaheed Keshvani
- Ryan Lall
- Krunalbhai Patel
- Mohammad Qazi
- Durand Soraine
- Simon Upton

Source: Rediff

== England ==
Coach: (England) Andy Pick

- Samit Patel (c)
- Ravi Bopara
- Tim Bresnan
- Dan Broadbent
- Alastair Cook
- Steven Davies
- Adam Harrison
- James Hildreth
- Mark Lawson
- Tom New (wk)
- Liam Plunkett
- David Stiff
- Mark Turner
- Luke Wright
- Vaibhav Jain

Source: Rediff

== India ==
Coach: (India) Robin Singh

- Ambati Rayudu (c)
- Shikhar Dhawan
- Gaurav Dhiman
- Faiz Fazal
- Praveen Gupta
- Dinesh Karthik (wk)
- Suresh Raina
- Nikhil Rathod
- Abhishek Sharma
- R. P. Singh
- Sunny Singh
- V. R. V. Singh
- Robin Uthappa
- Praful Waghela
- Rakesh Solanki

Source: Rediff

== Ireland ==
Coach: (South Africa) Adrian Birrell

- William Porterfield (c)
- Peter Blakeney
- Allen Coulter
- Gary Kidd
- Gareth McKee
- Eoin Morgan
- Kevin O'Brien
- John Pryor
- Boyd Rankin
- Robert Rankin
- Andrew Riddles
- Greg Thompson
- Simon Wells
- Gary Wilson (wk)

Source: Rediff

== Nepal ==
Coach: (Sri Lanka) Roy Dias

- Shakti Gauchan (c)
- Kanishka Chaugai
- Manoj Katuwal
- Sashi Kesari
- Paras Khadka
- Deepesh Khatri
- Lakpa Lama
- Ratan Rauniyar
- Basanta Regmi
- Manjeet Shrestha
- Monick Shrestha
- Raj Shrestha
- Yashwant Subedi
- Sharad Vesawkar

Source: Rediff

== New Zealand ==
Coach: (New Zealand) Dayle Hadlee

- Daniel Bolstad (c)
- Peter Carey
- Liam Chrisp
- Derek de Boorder
- Anton Devcich
- Sean Eathorne
- Brent Findlay
- Daniel Flynn
- Carl Frauenstein
- Sam McKay
- Craig Smith
- BJ Watling (wk)
- Brad Wilson

Source: Rediff

== Pakistan ==
Coach: (Pakistan) Aaqib Javed

- Khalid Latif (c)
- Abid Ali
- Musab Rauf
- Ali Imran
- Asif Iqbal
- Fawad Alam
- Jahangir Mirza
- Mansoor Amjad
- Taimur Nawaz
- Salman Qadir
- Tariq Mahmood
- Usman Saeed
- Wahab Riaz
- Zulqarnain Haider(wk)

Source: Rediff

== Papua New Guinea ==
Coach: (Australia) Paul Joseph

- Chris Amini (c)
- Kupana Amini
- Kapena Arua
- John Boto
- Mahuru Dai
- Lahui Davai
- John Gavera
- William Harry
- Vivian Kila
- Kila Pala
- Mavara Tamasi
- Assad Vala
- Vali Vali
- Jack Vare

Source: Rediff

== Scotland ==
Coach: (Scotland) William Morton

- Kyle Coetzer (c)
- Gordon Allan
- Craig Anderson
- Ian Brand
- Robert Cannon
- Kasiam Farid
- Allauddin Farooq
- Gordon Goudie
- Andrew Hislop
- Omer Hussain
- Moneeb Iqbal
- Ross Lyons
- Rajeev Routray
- Ian Young

Source: Rediff

== South Africa ==
Coach: (South Africa) Russell Domingo

- Divan van Wyk (c)
- Keagan Africa
- Craig Alexander
- Andrew Birch
- Jacob Booysen
- Clint Bowyer
- Francis Nkuna
- Vince Pennazza
- Vernon Philander
- Waylain September
- Mpumelelo Silwana (wk)
- Godfrey Stevens
- Roelof van der Merwe
- Vaughn van Jaarsveld

Source: Rediff

== Sri Lanka ==
Coach: (Sri Lanka) Somachandra de Silva

- Farveez Maharoof (c)
- Videsh Balasubramaniam
- Manoj Chanaka
- Gihan De Silva (wk)
- Sudheera De Zoysa
- Daminda Kularatne
- Kosala Kulasekara
- Angelo Mathews
- Nadeera Nawela
- Suraj Randiv
- Ganganath Ratnayake
- Kaushal Silva
- Upul Tharanga
- Harsha Vithana

Source: Rediff

== Uganda ==
Coach: (Kenya) Tom Tikolo

- Hamza Almuzahim (c)
- Davis Arinaitwe
- Fred Isabirye
- Emmanuel Isaneez
- Clive Kyangungu
- Arthur Kyobe
- Dennis Musali
- Patrick Ochan
- Jimmy Okello
- Martin Ondeko
- Raymond Otim
- Danniel Ruyange
- Ronald Ssemanda
- Michael Wambudhe

Source: Rediff

== West Indies ==
Coach: (Guyana) Clyde Butts

- Denesh Ramdin (c, wk)
- Jonathan Augustus
- Rishi Bachan
- Lionel Baker
- Kirk Edwards
- Assad Fudadin
- Tishan Maraj
- Xavier Marshall
- Mervin Matthew
- Ravi Rampaul
- Liam Sebastien
- Lendl Simmons
- Barrington Yearwood
- Zamal Khan

Source: Rediff

== Zimbabwe ==
Coach: (Zimbabwe) Walter Chawaguta

- Tino Mawoyo (c)
- James Cameron
- Elton Chigumbura
- Graeme Cremer
- Colin de Grandhomme
- Craig Ervine
- Stanley Marisa
- Tafadzwa Mufambisi
- Tinashe Panyangara
- Ed Rainsford
- Tinashe Ruswa
- Brendan Taylor (wk)
- Prosper Utseya
- Sean Williams

Source: Rediff

== Sources ==
- Team averages, ICC Under-19 World Cup 2003/04 – CricketArchive
- Statistics, ICC Under-19 World Cup 2003/04 – ESPNcricinfo
