= List of Indians cricketers (Madras Presidency) =

This is a list in alphabetical order of cricketers who played first-class cricket for the Indians cricket team, a team which played matches in India, almost all of which were played against the Europeans cricket team. The teams played an annual series of matches, known as the Madras Presidency Matches, between the 1915/16 season and 1951/52, with most of the matches given first-class status. (Note: No matches were played in 1948/49 and 1949/50 following Independence from the United Kingdom. The matches played in 1950/51 and 1951/52 were played over two days and, as a result, are not considered first-class matches. Those cricketers who played only in these matches are not listed here.) These matches were all played on the Madras Cricket Club Ground in the Madras Presidency, present day Chennai.

Two other matches were played in India by teams named Indians, both at the Bombay Gymkhana Ground. (Note: Madras is over 1,000 kilometres (620 mi) from Bombay, modern day Mumbai.) One, in November 1922, was also played against a team named Europeans, and one in December 1926 where a touring English team which represented the Marylebone Cricket Club were the opposition. Players who appeared for Indians in both of these matches have been included in the list. Those who played in matches played by touring Indian teams, which play under the name Indians when not playing against other national teams, have not been included.

The details are the player's name followed by the years in which he was active as a first-class player for the team. Note that many players represented other first-class teams besides the Indians.

== A ==
- Abdul Aziz (1922/23)
- Abdus Salaam (1922/23)
- A. Alagarathnan (Note: A. Alagarathnan played one first-class match for the team in December 1920. No other biographical details are known.) (1920/21)
- Bellipadi Chandrahasa Alva (1944/45-1947/48)
- A. Ananthanarayanan (Note: A. Ananthanarayanan played one first-class match for the team in December 1943. He also played for Madras in the Ranji Trophy. His first-class career lasted nine matches, and included two centuries. No other biographical details are known.) (1943/44)
- T. P. Aruvumudu (Note: T. P. Aruvumudu played one first-class match for the team in January 1925. No other biographical details are known.) (1924/25)

== B ==
- T. Bangarababu (Note: T. Bangarababu played two first-class matches for the team. No other biographical details are known.) (1922/23–1923/24)
- B. S. R. Bhadradri (Note: B. S. R. Bhadradri played six first-class matches for the team. He also played for Madras in the Ranji Trophy. His first-class career lasted 13 matches. No other biographical details are known.) (1937/38–1944/45)
- K. S. Bhandari (Note: K. S. Bhandari played one first-class match for the team in January 1925. No other biographical details are known.) (1924/25)
- B. Bhaskar Rao (Note: B. Bhaskar Rao played five first-class match for the team in between January 1918 and January 1926. He claimed one five wicket haul. No other biographical details are known.) (1917/18–1925/26)
- M. V. Bobjee (1945/46–1946/47)

== C ==
- Thiruvenkati Chari (1932/33–1939/40)
- R. Charry (Note: R. Charry played one first-class match for the team in January 1917. No other biographical details are known.) (1916/17)
- Sorabji Colah (Note: Only played for the team in the match against MCC in 1925/26.) (1925/26)

== D ==
- Safi Darashah (1929/30)
- S. G. Deenan (Note: S. G. Deenan played two first-class matches for the team. He also played for Madras and Andhra in the Ranji Trophy. He was born on 1 June 1918, but no other biographical details are known.) (1937/38–1938/39)
- Dinkar Deodhar (1926/27)
- R. Dorairajan (Note: R. Dorairajan played one first-class match for the team in January 1948. No other biographical details are known.) (1947/48)
- T. M. Doraiswami (Note: T. M. Doraiswami played one first-class matches for the team in January 1939. He also played for Madras in the Ranji Trophy. His first-class career lasted eight matches. He was born in 1911 and died in May 1977, but no other biographical details are known.) (1938/39)

== E ==
- M. Ethirajulu (Note: M. Ethirajulu played one first-class match for the team in December 1915. No other biographical details are known.) (1915/16)

== F ==
- Feroze Khan (1922/23)

== G ==
- C. R. Ganapathy (1915/16–1928/29)
- Shankarrao Godambe (1926/27)
- Morappakam Gopalan (1926/27–1947/48)
- S. Gopalaswami (Note: S. Gopalaswami played one first-class match for the team in January 1948. No other biographical details are known.)
- Grandhi (Note: S. Gopalaswami played one first-class match for the team in January 1926. Apart from his last name, no other biographical details are known.) (1925/26)
- P. S. Grant (Note: P. S. Grant played one first-class match for the team in January 1923. No other biographical details are known.) (1922/23)
- S. K. Gurunathan (1945/46)

== H ==
- Syed Mohammad Hadi (1935/36)
- Mohammad Hussain (1925/26–1935/36)
- Hyder Ali (1935/36)

== J ==
- V. Jagannathan (Note: V. Jagannathan played two first-class matches for the team, taking a five wicket haul and ten wickets in a match in one of his matches. He also played twice for Madras. No other biographical details are known.)
- Jagannatha Rao (Note: Jagannatha Rao played two first-class matches for the team. No other biographical details are known.) (1931/32–1938/39)
- Laxmidas Jai (1926/27)
- Rustomji Jamshedji (1926/27)
- P. Janardhan (Note: P. Janardhan played two first-class matches for the team. No other biographical details are known.) (1933/34–1936/37)
- S. M. Joshi (1922/23)

== K ==
- Bomanji Kalapesi (1922/23)
- P. A. Kanickam (1920/21–1926/27)
- C. R. Kannabhiran (1936/37)
- K. S. Kannan (1942/43–1947/48)
- N. Kannayiram (1947/48)
- Dolly Kapadia (1922/23)
- T. P. Kesavan (1927/28)
- Bharat Khanna (1933/34)
- Rama Krishnappa (1922/23–1925/26)
- B. S. Krishna Rao (1940/41)
- A. V. Krishnaswami (1930/31–1939/40)
- C. V. Krishnaswami (1945/46)
- C. K. Krishnaswamy (1915/16–1928/29)
- N. Krishnaswamy (1946/47)

== L ==
- Cheruvari Lakshmanan (1925/26–1930/31)
- P. V. Lakshmanan (1938/39)
- K. P. Lakshmanan Rao (1916/17–1920/21)

== M ==
- Madhava Rao (1940/41–1942/43)
- N. Mahadevan (1946/47)
- N. Manjinath (1917/18)
- S. S. Manoharan (1937/38)
- Ramdas Mardi (1946/47–1947/48)
- Medappa (1919/20)
- Kekhashru Mistry (1922/23–1926/27)
- T. Murari (1931/32)
- Mushtaq Ali (1930/31)

== N ==
- C. K. Nainakannu (1927/28–1945/46)
- Narayanaswami Rao (1936/37–1940/41)
- Janardan Navle (1922/23)
- C. K. Nayudu (1920/21–1939/40)
- C. L. Nayudu (1923/24)
- C. S. Nayudu (1932/33–1947/48)
- Nazir Ali (1925/26)

== P ==
- Phiroze Palia (1931/32–1932/33)
- Vithal Palwankar (1922/23)
- T. S. Parankusam (1935/36–1944/45)
- C. D. Parthasarathi (1935/36)
- Gopalaswami Parthasarathy (1929/30–1947/48)
- T. V. Parthasarathi (1943/44)
- E. C. Phillip (1944/45–1946/47)
- M. V. Prakash (1947/48)

== R ==
- P. Rajaratnam (1924/25)
- B. V. Ramanujam (1929/30–1937/38)
- Cotah Ramaswami (1915/16–1939/40)
- Ladha Ramji (1926/27)
- Raja of Ramnad (1942/43–1943/44)
- A. G. Ram Singh (1930/31–1945/46)
- A. Rangabashyan (1916/17–1928/29)
- Commandur Rangachari (1938/39–1947/48)
- C. Ranganathan (1917/18–1922/23)
- Mark Ranganathan (1933/34)
- T. Ranganathan (1947/48)
- R. K. Rao (1931/32)

== S ==
- Shahabuddin (1929/30–1932/33)
- M. Sivanath (1932/33–1933/34)
- M. C. Sivasankaram (1921/22–1931/32)
- J. Srinivas (1923/24)
- M. O. Srinivasan (1940/41–1947/48)
- B. Subramaniam (1915/16–1923/24)
- T. K. Sukumaran (Note: Both of T. K. Sukumarin's first-class matches were for the team. He is also known to have played once for Madras Cricket Club in 1926 and in five matches for the Federated Malay States cricket team against Straits Settlements between 1930 and 1940. Other than his name, no biographical details are known.) (1923/24–1924/25)
- N. Suryanarayan (1945/46)
- M. Swaminathan (1940/41–1944/45)
- N. N. Swarna (1915/16–1930/31)
- J. Sydney (1944/45)

== T ==
- T. Thangavelu (1915/16–1921/22)
- B. S. Thyagarajan (1936/37)

== U ==
- K. Ugappa Shetty (1927/28–1928/29)
- M. A. Uttappa (1933/34–1936/37)

== V ==
- Hormasji Vajifdar (1922/23)
- P. V. Varadan (1937/38)
- T. Vasu (1915/16–1921/22)
- M. G. Venkataraman (1945/46)
- M. Venkataramanjulu (1915/16–1930/31)
- N. J. Venkatesan (1939/40–1946/47)
- Maharajkumar of Vizianagram (1930/31–1932/33)

== W ==
- Wazir Ali (1925/26)
- Cedric Williams (1917/18)

== Y ==
- P. Yoganathan (1915/16–1927/28)
