= Mehta =

Mehta (IPA: [meːɦt̪aː]) is an Indian surname, derived from the Sanskrit word mahita meaning 'great' or 'praised'. It is found among several Indian religious groups, including Hindus, Jains, Parsis, and Sikhs. Among Hindus, it is used by a wide range of castes and social groups, including Koeri, Rajputs, Brahmins (Mohyal Brahmin), Tyagi and Bania.

== Distribution in India ==
People with this surname are native to North and Western regions of India, including Punjab, Himachal Pradesh, Haryana, Delhi, Uttarakhand, Uttar Pradesh, Bihar, Rajasthan, Gujarat, and Maharashtra (Mumbai).

== As surname used by Rajputs ==
Mehta is also a Rajput clan name in the Kumaon and Garhwal region of Uttarakhand, hilly terrains of Himachal Pradesh, Jammu and Kashmir, and western areas of Nepal. They served as nobles, ministers and bureaucrats under the Katyuri Kings and Chand Kings of Uttarakhand. People having this surname are native to Almora, Bageshwar, and Nainital districts of Uttarakhand, eastern parts of Himachal, Jammu and Kashmir, and western Nepal. In Nepal, they come under the Chhetri varna and are considered chieftains of villages.

In Rajasthan, Mehta was originally used as a term of respect applied to administrative office holders and bureaucrats of Rajputana kings. Among Rajputs, it is used as both title and surname by Dewans (ministers and nobles) of Bikaner State and many other states of Rajputana and are considered direct descendants of the Solar dynasty (Suryavanshi) and Chauhan Dynasty. The dewans and chief ministers of the Bikaner State were:

- 1460–1465 Bachhraj Bothra (Mantri-Dewan / Jodhpur) / Rao Jodha
- 1465–1505 Bachhraj Bothra (Founding Dewan / Bikaner) / Rao Bika
- 1505–1526 Karam Singh Bothra Bachhawat (Descendants of Bachhraj were known as Bachhawats) / Rao Nar Singh and Rao Lunkaran
- 1571–1591 Mehta Karam Chand Bachhawat (Title of Mehta granted by Emperor Akbar) / Rao Kalyan Mal and Raja Rai Singh
- 1619–1620 Mehta Bhag Chand Bothra Bachhawat / Raja Sur Singh
- 1619–1620 Mehta Lakshmi Chand Bothra Bachhawat / Raja Sur Singh
- 1735 – February 1751: Mehta Bakhtawar Singh (1st time) (b. 1707 – d. 1779)
- 1752–1756: Mehta Bakhtawar Singh (2nd time) (s.a.)
- 1756 – December 1757: Mehta Prithvi Singh
- 1757–1762: Mehta Bakhtawar Singh (3rd time) (s.a.)
- September 1765 – 1779: Mehta Bakhtawar Singh (4th time) (s.a.)
- 1779–178.: Mehta Swaroop Singh
- 178.–1787: Mehta Thakursi
- 1787–1791: Mehta Madho Rao
- 1794–1805: Mehta Rao Sahib Singh Gun Roop
- April 1815 – February 1816: Mehta Bhomji
- February 1816 – 1828: Abhai Singh Mehta
- 1853–1853: Leeladhar Mehta
- 1868: Sheo Lal Mehta

== As surname used by Banias ==
Among Oswal and Porwal Banias, Mehta is a clan name.

== As surname used by Khatris ==
Among Khatris, Mehta is a clan name.

== Notable individuals ==
Notable individuals with this surname include:

- Aditya Mehta (born 1985), snooker player
- Ajay Mehta, Indian actor
- Alok Mehta (born 1952), Indian journalist
- Alok Kumar Mehta, former General Secretary of Rashtriya Janata Dal, served as minister in Government of Bihar.
- Amit Mehta (born 1971), United States district judge
- Anil Mehta, film director, cinematographer
- Apoorva Mehta (born 1986), founder of Instacart
- Ashok Mehta (1947–2012), Indian cinematographer
- Atul Mehta (born 1949), Indian cricketer
- Balwantrai Mehta (1900–1965), Gujarat's second Chief Minister
- Bejun Mehta (born 1968), American countertenor
- Deepa Mehta (born 1950), Canadian film director and screenwriter
- Deena Mehta (born 1961), Indian first woman president of the Bombay Stock Exchange
- Devaanshi Mehta (1996–2012), British-Indian student who started the Asian Donor Campaign
- Dilip Mehta
- Gita Mehta (née Patnaik; 1943–2023), Indian writer
- Gulshan Kumar Mehta (1937–2009), Indian lyricist and actor
- Hansa Jivraj Mehta (1897–1995), Indian reformist, social activist, educator, independence activist, and writer
- Harshad Mehta (1954–2001), Indian stockbroker who was convicted of market manipulation and died of a heart attack at age 47.
- Hemant Mehta (born 1983), American-born Indian author
- Homi Maneck Mehta (1871–1948), Indian industrialist and philanthropist
- Jagat Singh Mehta (1922–2014), Foreign Secretary of India
- Jamshed Nusserwanjee Mehta (1886–1952), Mayor of Karachi
- Jarava Lal Mehta (1912–1988), Indian philosopher
- Jay Mehta (born 1961), businessman and owner of the Mehta Group
- Jehangir Mehta (born 1971), chef and owner of New York City restaurants
- Jivraj Narayan Mehta (1887–1978), Gujarat's first Chief Minister
- Kalu Mehta (1440–1522), father of Sikhism's founder Guru Nanak
- Laxmi Narayan Mehta (1980), former member of Bihar legislative assembly.
- Madan Lal Mehta (1932–2006), theoretical physicist in the field of random matrix theory
- Mehli Mehta, (1908–2002): musician; founder of the Bombay Philharmonic and Bombay String Orchestras
- Nakuul Mehta (born 1983), actor and model
- Nariman Mehta (1920–2014), organic chemist and inventor of bupropion (Wellbutrin)
- Narsinh Mehta, Gujarati spiritual poet
- Neil Mehta, American venture capitalist
- Nicky Mehta, singer, songwriter, member of Canadian folk trio The Wailin' Jennys
- Pherozeshah Mehta (1845–1915), Indian political leader, activist, and lawyer
- Phiroz Mehta (1902–1994), writer on religious topics, and philosopher
- Pratap Bhanu Mehta (born 1967), Indian academic and think tank
- Raj Mehta
- Russell Mehta, Indian businessman
- Sahil Mehta (actor, born 1988) (born 1988), Indian actor
- Samir Mehta
- Sargun Mehta (born 1988), Indian model, comedian, dancer, presenter and actress
- Shailendra Raj Mehta (born 1959), Indian economist, president and director, MICA
- Shekhar Mehta (1945–2006), Ugandan-born Kenyan rally driver
- Sonny Mehta (born Ajai Singh Mehta; 1942–2019), Indian book editor
- Suketu Mehta (born 1963), India-born American writer
- Tarak Mehta (Born Tarak Janubhai Mehta; 1929-2017), Indian writer, humorist, and playwright
- Tushar Mehta
- Tyeb Mehta (1925–2009), Indian painter
- Tulsidas Mehta, multiple times Member of Bihar Legislative Assembly, a former minister in Government of Bihar.
- Uday Singh Mehta, American political scientist
- Veer Singh Mehta (born 1949), Indian neurosurgeon
- Veronica Mehta, British Punjabi singer
- Vikram Bhagvandas Mehta (1946–2014), Indian mathematician
- Vipra Mehta, Indian Actress and beauty pageant title holder
- Zarin Mehta (born 1938), executive director of the New York Philharmonic Orchestra; brother of Zubin
- Zubeida Begum (1926-1952), Indian actress born to Faiza Bai and Shri Qasembhai Mehta; she was married to Maharaja of Jodhpur, Hanwant Singh
- Zubin Mehta (born 1936), Indian conductor of Western classical music
