= 2015–16 Irani Cup =

Mumbai	Rest of India
603 & 182	306 & 482/6
- Rest of India won by 4 wickets
- Date: 6 March 2016 – 10 March 2016
- Venue: Brabourne Stadium, Mumbai
- Player of the match: Karun Nair(ROI)

The 2015–16 Irani Cup, also called 2015–16 Irani Trophy, was the 54th season of the Irani Cup, a first-class cricket competition in India. It was played as a one-off match from 6 March to 10 March 2016 between the 2015–16 Ranji champions, Mumbai and the Rest of India team. Naman Ojha captained the Rest of India team. The match was held at Brabourne Stadium, Mumbai.

== Squads ==
Mumbai	Rest of India
Playing XI
Akhil Herwadkar	Faiz Fazal
Jay Bista	Srikar Bharat (†)
Shreyas Iyer	Sudip Chatterjee
Suryakumar Yadav	Karun Nair
Aditya Tare (*, †)	Sheldon Jackson
Abhishek Nayar	Naman Ojha (*, †)
Siddhesh Lad	Stuart Binny
Iqbal Abdulla	Jayant Yadav
Dhawal Kulkarni	Jaydev Unadkat
Shardul Thakur	Krishna Das
Balwinder Sandhu	Ankit Rajpoot
Reserve Bench
Sufiyan Shaikh (†)	Barinder Sran
Bhavin Thakkar	Akshay Wakhare
Badre Alam	Shahbaz Nadeem
Vishal Dabholkar	Ian Dev Singh
Nikhil Patil	Nathu Singh

== Match ==
6–10 March
Scorecard

Mumbai	v	Rest of India
603 (158.2 overs); Suryakumar Yadav 156 (271); Jayant Yadav 4/132 (41.2 overs)		306 (99.5 overs); Karun Nair 94 (192); Abhishek Nayar 3/35 (19 overs)
182 (51.2 overs); Siddhesh Lad 60 (109); Jayant Yadav 4/93 (24 overs)		482/6 (129.4 overs); Faiz Fazal 127 (280); Iqbal Abdulla 5/154 (42.4 overs)

Rest of India won by 4 wickets
Brabourne Stadium, Mumbai
Umpires: Nitin Menon (Ind) and Virender Sharma (Ind)
Player of the match: Karun Nair

- Mumbai won the toss and elected to bat.
- Jay Bista (Mumbai) scored his maiden first-class century.
