= Oval Ground =

Sports venue in Mumbai, Maharashtra, India

Elphinstone College Ground
- Oval Ground
- Interactive map of Elphinstone College Ground
- Full name: Elphinstone College Ground
- Former names: Oval Ground
- Location: Mumbai, Maharashtra
- Owner: Elphinstone College
- Operator: Elphinstone College

Construction
- Groundbreaking: 1905
- Opened: 1905; 121 years ago

Website
- CricketArchive

Elphinstone College Ground or Oval Ground is a multi purpose ground in Mumbai, Maharashtra. The ground is mainly used for organizing matches of football, cricket and other sports. It is one of the oldest cricket grounds in Mumbai, and located near Elphinstone College. The ground is mainly used for Mumbai's prestigious Dr HD Kanga Memorial Cricket League. The ground hosted its first match in February 1906 (120 years ago) when Elphinstone College Past and Present played against Ceylonese on their tour to India.

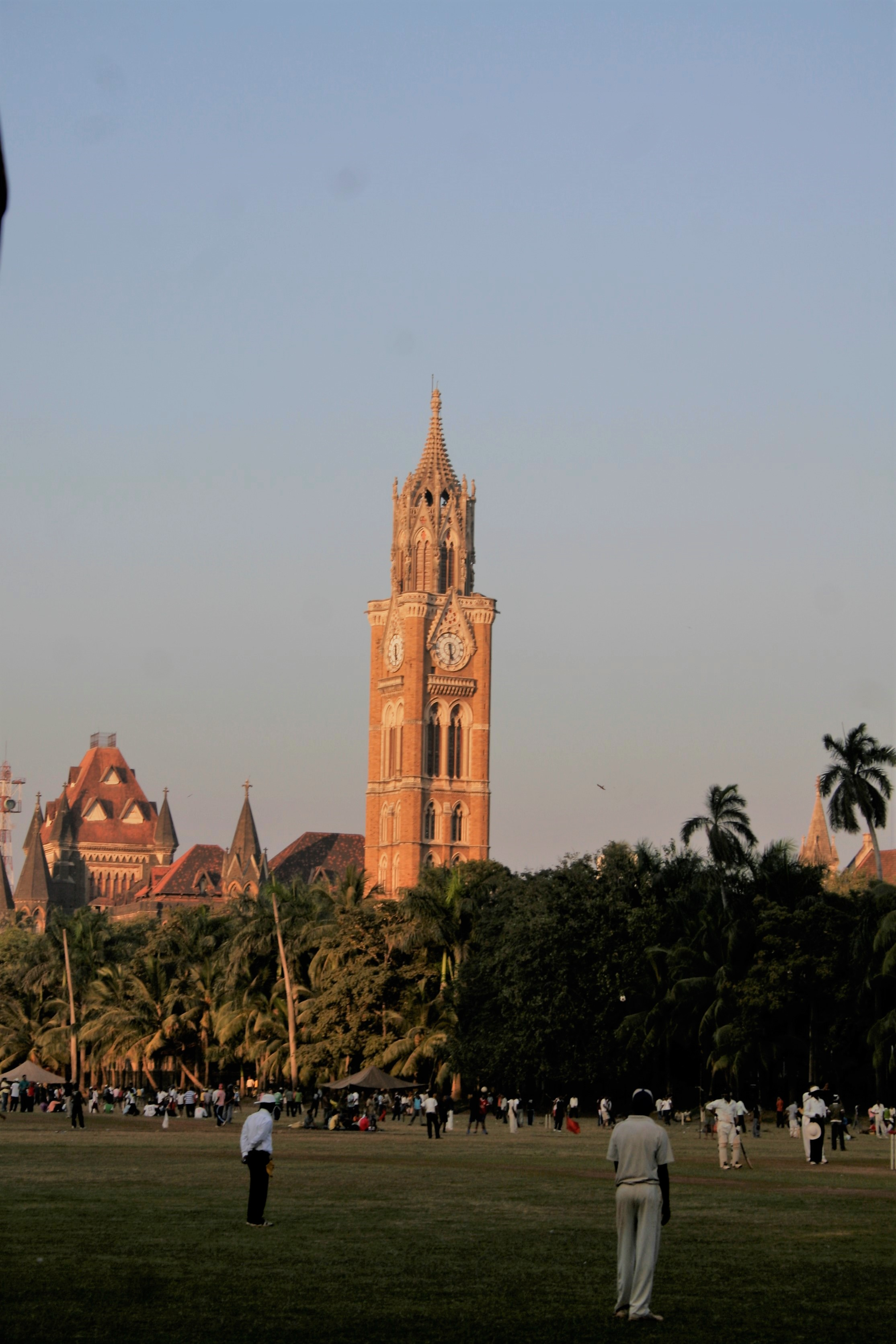
Oval Ground
