= Alok =

Alok is an Indian given name of Sanskrit origin.

== People with the given name Alok ==
- Alok (DJ) (born 1991), Brazilian DJ and music producer
- Alok Bhargava (born 1954), Indian-American econometrician
- Alok Chatterjee (1960/1961–2025), Indian theatre actor and director
- Alok R. Chaturvedi, Professor of Information Systems
- Alok Jena (born 1948), Indian cricketer
- Alok Kapali (born 1984), Bangladeshi cricketer
- Alok Mehta, Indian Hindi journalist, editor-in-chief of National Dunia
- Alok Kumar Mehta (born 1966), Indian politician, member of the 14th Lok Sabha of India
- Alok Mukherjee (born c. 1945), Canadian human rights and equity facilitator
- Alok Nath (born 1956), Indian film actor
- Alok Nembang, Nepali singer and director
- Alok Sharma (born 1967), Indian-born British politician
- Alok Tiwari (born 1979), Indian politician
- Alok Vaid-Menon (born 1991), Indian-American artist and activist.

== See also ==
- Alok Industries, a textile manufacturing company based in Mumbai, India
- Alok Senior Secondary School - see List of schools in Udaipur, Rajasthan, India
