= Rajesh Verma =

Rajesh Verma may refer to:

- Rajesh Verma (Sitapur politician) (born 1960), Indian politician
- Rajesh Verma (cricketer) (1981–2022), Indian cricketer
- Rajesh Verma (Khagaria politician) (born 1992), Indian politician
