= Cricket with Vijay Merchant =

Cricket with Vijay Merchant was an Indian radio programme broadcast in the 1970s and 1980s, hosted by Indian cricketer Vijay Merchant.

It aired on Sunday afternoons on All India Radio (AIR). Anu D. Aggarwal quotes a survey, which revealed that it was one of the most listened to sponsored programmes. Raju Bhartan describes how Vijay Merchant devoted his programme to carry a detailed health report of the ailing Lala Amarnath, calling the radio programme "popular". Shabnam Minwalla wrote on AIR's platinum anniversary: "Indeed, even Mumbaikars who have succumbed to the spicy flavours of FM and psychedelic charms of MTV turn misty-eyed over the good old days of 'Cricket with Vijay Merchant'".

== Gavaskar's retirement ==
ER Ramachandran mentions that it was Vijay Merchant who influenced Sunil Gavaskar, to retire, using his weekly "Cricket with Vijay Merchant" (which he calls a TV show), to put pressure on Gavaskar to do so.
