= Champak Mehta =

Indian cricketer (1907–1981)

Personal information
- Full name: Champaklal Narotamdas Mehta
- Born: 1907; Surat, British India
- Died: 13 December 1981 (aged 78–79); Bombay, Maharashtra, India
- Batting: Right-handed
- Bowling: Right-arm fast
- Role: Batsman, occasional wicket-keeper

Domestic team information
- Years: Team
- 1929/30–1935/36: Hindus
- 1933/34–1935/36: Bombay
- 1934/35: Gujarat

Career statistics
Competition	First-class
Matches	19
Runs scored	814
Batting average	26.25
100s/50s	0/5
Top score	96
Balls bowled	350
Wickets	7
Bowling average	46.71
5 wickets in innings	0
10 wickets in match	0
Best bowling	2/19
Catches/stumpings	7/–
- Source: ESPNcricinfo, 7 April 2022

Champaklal Narotamdas Mehta (1907 – 13 December 1981) was an Indian cricketer who played for Bombay, Gujarat and Hindus in 1930s.

Mehta was born in Surat and studied in the St. Xavier's College, Mumbai. He made his debut in the Bombay Quadrangular in 1929 but the tournament was suspended for the next four seasons. In support of the non-cooperation movement, Vijay Merchant, L. P. Jai and Mehta refused to take part in the trials for the Indian tour to England in 1932. He took part in the Test trials for the 1933-34 series.

Mehta died of a heart attack in Bombay in 1981.
