= Hattangadi =

Hattangadi is a surname. Notable people with the surname include:

- Rohini Hattangadi, Indian actress
- Shishir Hattangadi (born 1961), Indian cricketer
