= Kanga Cricket League =

Indian monsoon season cricket league

- Administrator: Mumbai Cricket Association
- Cricket format: Two-Innings
- Tournament format: Round robin
- Host: Mumbai
- Champions: Greater Mumbai Police Sports Club
- Participants: 98

The Kanga Cricket League (officially the Dr. H. D. Kanga Memorial Cricket League) is a cricket competition in Mumbai, India, inaugurated in 1948. It is named after Hormasji Kanga, who played 43 First class cricket matches as an all-rounder, and was also a selector for the India national cricket team

== Origins ==
The Kanga League was founded in 1948, and is held in Mumbai between July and October, during the Indian monsoon season. As such, the grounds are very unpredictable, and can often be very wet, meaning the ball can "stop, shoot, skid and swing - all in a day's play." Shishir Hattangadi has remarked that "If a batsman scored 30 or 50 runs, it would be considered equivalent to an 80 or a 100." Vijay Merchant has been suggested as the founder of the league, and the league was named after Bombay cricketer Hormasji Kanga. Kanga was the first Indian to score a double century in a first-class match. He also worked as the President of the Bombay Cricket Association and was the vice-president of the Board of Control for Cricket in India.

== History ==
The league has featured many Indian Test cricketers, including Buck Divecha, Dattu Phadkar and Sunil Gavaskar. Aged 11, Sachin Tendulkar appeared in the league representing John Bright Cricket Club, and in 1985–86, he played the whole season aged 12. Sachin's son Arjun Tendulkar made his Kanga League debut aged 13 in 2013. Bombay and Indian Test batsman Madhav Apte played in every Kanga League between 1948 and 2002, and wicket-keeper Mehli Irani played in the Kanga League for 50 years, retiring at the age of 68. Zaheer Khan debuted in the 1996 Kanga League aged 18, and bowled 10 consecutive maiden overs in a match. In a Kanga League Division A match in November 2014, Pardeep Sahu took all ten wickets in an innings, becoming the fourth bowler to do so in the league. The 2013 and 2014 Kanga Leagues were scheduled at the end of the monsoon season, but the league was moved back into the monsoon season in 2015.

== Records ==
Vithal Patil holds the record for most wickets in the Kanga League, with 759 wickets for the Dadar Union Cricket Club between 1952 and 1984. Aditya Tare is the only batsman to have ever scored a double century in a Kanga League match; Tare scored 201 in a 2013 match for Victory Cricket Club against Fort Vijay Cricket Club. In 2014, Neil Narvekar made 100 runs off 29 balls, the fastest century in Kanga League history.

== Competition format ==
98 teams play in the Kanga League; they are divided into 7 groups of 14 teams.

=== Points System ===
The points systems for the Kanga League is as follows:

Result of match	Points
Outright win	5 Points
First Innings win but no outright result	3 Points
Loss on First Innings	0 Point
Tie on First Innings without outright result	1 Point
Tie on both Innings	2 Points
Outright loss	–1 Point
First Innings result not obtained with or without weather interference	1 Point
Innings Win / Win by 10 wickets	1 Bonus Point
