= 2014–15 Irani Cup =

Karnataka	Rest of India
244 & 422	264 & 156
- Karnataka won by 246 runs
- Date: 17 March 2015 – 21 March 2015
- Venue: Chinnaswamy Stadium, Bangalore
- Player of the match: Manish Pandey (Karnataka)

The 2014–15 Irani Cup, also called 2014-15 Irani Trophy, will be the 53rd season of the Irani Cup, a first-class cricket competition in India. It will be a one-off match to be played from 17 March to 21 March 2015 between the 2014–15 Ranji champions Karnataka and the Rest of India team. Chinnaswamy Stadium, the home ground of Karnataka, will host the match.

== Squads ==
Karnataka	Rest of India
Playing XI
Robin Uthappa (†)	Unmukt Chand
Mayank Agarwal	Jiwanjot Singh
Ravikumar Samarth	Paras Dogra
Manish Pandey	Naman Ojha (†)
Karun Nair	Manoj Tiwary (*)
Abhishek Reddy^{1}	Kedar Jadhav
Shreyas Gopal	Rishi Dhawan
Vinay Kumar (*)	Shardul Thakur
Abhimanyu Mithun	Varun Aaron
Sreenath Aravind	Jayant Yadav
HS Sharath	Pragyan Ojha
Reserve Bench
Shishir Bhavane	Baba Aparajith
CM Gautam (†)	Jalaj Saxena
KC Avinash (†)	Rush Kalaria
Udit Patel	Vijay Shankar
Jagadeesha Suchith

^{1} Reddy replaced KL Rahul who was ruled out of the Irani Cup with an injury.

== Scorecard ==
Rest of India won the toss and elected to field

=== Innings 1 ===
Karnataka 1st innings
Player	Status	Runs	Balls	4s	6s	Strike rate
Robin Uthappa (†)	c N Ojha b Aaron	10	22	2	0	45.45
Mayank Agarwal	c N Ojha b Aaron	68	119	13	0	57.14
Ravikumar Samarth	c N Ojha b Dhawan	20	37	3	0	54.05
Manish Pandey	c N Ojha b Aaron	3	30	0	0	10.00
Karun Nair	c Chand b Aaron	59	99	11	0	59.59
Abhishek Reddy	c N Ojha b Thakur	54	87	10	0	62.06
Shreyas Gopal	lbw b P Ojha	45	29	7	1	17.24
Vinay Kumar (c)	lbw b Aaron	6	4	1	0	150.00
Abhimanyu Mithun	lbw b Aaron	11	34	1	0	32.35
Sreenath Aravind	c N Ojha b P Ojha	2	2	0	0	100.00
HS Sharath	not out	0	3	0	0	0.00
Extras	(b 2, lb 1, nb 3)	6				
Total	(all out; 77.1 overs)	244				

Fall of wickets: 1-26 (Uthappa, 7.5 ov), 2-66 (Samarth, 21.4 ov), 3-90 (Pandey, 32.3 ov), 4-107 (Agarwal, 36.4 ov), 5-220 (Reddy, 64.6 ov), 6-220 (Nair, 65.1 ov), 7-226 (Vinay Kumar, 65.5 ov), 8-242 (Gopal, 76.1 ov), 9-244 (Aravind, 76.3 ov), 10-244 (Mithun, 77.1 ov)

Rest of India bowling
Bowler	Overs	Maidens	Runs	Wickets	Econ	Wides	NBs
Shardul Thakur	22	2	78	1	3.54	{{{wides}}}	{{{no-balls}}}
Rishi Dhawan	18	5	51	1	2.83	{{{wides}}}	{{{no-balls}}}
Varun Aaron	17.1	8	63	6	3.66	{{{wides}}}	{{{no-balls}}}
Pragyan Ojha	15	3	35	2	2.33	{{{wides}}}	{{{no-balls}}}
Jayant Yadav	5	2	14	0	2.80	{{{wides}}}	{{{no-balls}}}

=== Innings 2 ===
Rest of India 1st innings
Player	Status	Runs	Balls	4s	6s	Strike rate
Unmukt Chand	b Vinay Kumar	0	1	0	0	0.00
Jiwanjot Singh	c Uthappa b Vinay Kumar	17	23	3	0	73.91
Paras Dogra	lbw b Gopal	26	53	3	0	49.05
Naman Ojha (†)	c Agarwal b Mithun	34	68	6	0	50.0
Manoj Tiwary (c)	lbw b Vinay Kumar	14	28	2	0	50.00
Kedar Jadhav	b Mithun	78	106	13	0	73.58
Jayant Yadav	b Shreyas Gopal	26	70	4	0	37.14
Rishi Dhawan	c Sharath b Mithun	15	26	3	0	57.69
Shardul Thakur	b Shreyas Gopal	17	15	2	0	113.33
Varun Aaron	b Aravind	25	52	2	1	48.07
Pragyan Ojha	not out	4	12	0	0	3.33
Extras	(b 5, lb 3)	8				
Total	(all out; 75.4 overs)	264				

Fall of wickets: 1-0 (Chand, 0.1 ov), 2-23 (Jiwanjot Singh, 6.2 ov), 3-72 (Dogra, 22.1 ov), 4-90 (NV Ojha, 27.4 ov), 5-102 (Tiwary, 30.4 ov), 6-182 (Yadav, 54.1 ov), 7-218 (Dhawan, 62.2 ov), 8-219 (Jadhav, 62.4 ov), 9-242 (Thakur, 68.1 ov), 10-264 (Aaron, 75.4 ov)

Karnataka bowling
Bowler	Overs	Maidens	Runs	Wickets	Econ	Wides	NBs
Vinay Kumar	22	4	76	3	3.45	{{{wides}}}	{{{no-balls}}}
Abhimanyu Mithun	17	1	46	3	2.70	{{{wides}}}	{{{no-balls}}}
Sreenath Aravind	14.4	0	40	1	2.72	{{{wides}}}	{{{no-balls}}}
HS Sharath	8	0	36	0	4.50	{{{wides}}}	{{{no-balls}}}
Shreyas Gopal	13	1	51	3	3.92	{{{wides}}}	{{{no-balls}}}
Mayank Agarwal	1	0	7	0	7.00	{{{wides}}}	{{{no-balls}}}

=== Innings 3 ===
Karnataka 2nd innings
Player	Status	Runs	Balls	4s	6s	Strike rate
Ravikumar Samarth	b Thakur	81	159	10	0	50.94
Mayank Agarwal	c Jadhav b Aaron	28	35	4	0	80.00
Abhishek Reddy	lbw b P Ojha	31	54	5	0	57.40
Robin Uthappa (†)	b Aaron	6	15	1	0	40.00
Karun Nair	lbw b P Ojha	80	123	12	0	65.04
Manish Pandey	not out	123	164	12	3	75.00
Shreyas Gopal	c N Ojha b R Dhawan	0	4	0	0	00.00
Vinay Kumar (c)	c N Ojha b Thakur	38	77	6	0	49.35
Abhimanyu Mithun	b Thakur	10	12	1	0	83.33
Sreenath Aravind	lbw b Thakur	4	4	1	0	100.00
HS Sharath	c Dogra b Thakur	5	16	0	0	31.25
Extras	(b 5, lb 4, w 7)	16				
Total	(all out; 110.3 overs)	422				

Fall of wickets: 1-54 (Agarwal, 13.5 ov), 2-105 (Reddy, 32.1 ov), 3-121 (Uthappa, 35.3 ov), 4-182 (Samarth, 51.3 ov), 5-288 (Nair, 78.4 ov), 6-289 (Gopal, 79.3 ov), 7-354 (Vinay Kumar, 100.6 ov), 8-390 (Mithun, 104.5 ov), 9-408 (Aravind, 106.3 ov), 10-422 (Sharath, 110.3 ov)

Rest of India bowling
Bowler	Overs	Maidens	Runs	Wickets	Econ	Wides	NBs
Rishi Dhawan	21	1	74	1	3.52	{{{wides}}}	{{{no-balls}}}
Varun Aaron	27	4	131	2	4.85	{{{wides}}}	{{{no-balls}}}
Shardul Thakur	29.3	6	86	5	2.91	{{{wides}}}	{{{no-balls}}}
Pragyan Ojha	28	3	100	2	3.57	{{{wides}}}	{{{no-balls}}}
Jayant Yadav	4	0	16	0	4.00	{{{wides}}}	{{{no-balls}}}
Manoj Tiwary	1	0	6	0	6.00	{{{wides}}}	{{{no-balls}}}
