= International cricket in 1944–45 =

International cricket season

The 1944–45 international cricket season was from September 1944 to April 1945. However, no Test matches were held during this period, except a few domestic competitions due to the prevailing Second World War.

== Season overview ==
International tours
Start date	Home team	Away team	Results [Matches]			
Start date	Home team	Away team	Test	ODI	FC	LA
1 April 1945	Ceylon	India	—	—	0–0 [1]	—

== April ==
=== India in Ceylon ===
Three-day Match
No.	Date	Home captain	Away captain	Venue	Result
Match	1–3 April	SS Jayawickreme	Vijay Merchant	P Saravanamuttu Stadium, Colombo	Match drawn
