= Abhishek Mohan =

Indian cricketer

Personal information
- Born: 15 December 1992 (age 33); Thiruvananthapuram, Kerala, India
- Batting: Left-handed
- Bowling: Right arm medium-fast
- Role: Bowler

Domestic team information
- Years: Team
- 2012–present: Kerala

Career statistics
Competition	FC	LA	T20
Matches	3	9	4
Runs scored	31	33	20
Batting average	7.75	11.00	10.00
100s/50s	0/0	0/0	0/0
Top score	11	19	12
Balls bowled	255	372	90
Wickets	1	9	5
Bowling average	140.00	41.22	24.20
5 wickets in innings	0	0	0
10 wickets in match	0	0	0
Best bowling	1/34	2/40	3/30
Catches/stumpings	1/0	1/0	0/0
- Source: ESPNcricinfo, 12 March 2017

Abhishek Mohan (born 15 December 1992) is an Indian cricketer who plays for Kerala in domestic cricket. He is an all-rounder who bats left-handed and bowls right-arm medium-pace.

== Domestic career ==
Abhishek was born on 15 December 1992. Hailing from the state capital Trivandrum, Abhishek had represented Kerala on almost all age-limit tournaments in his teens. He was the highest wicket-taker on the 2013-14 CK Nayudu Under-25 trophy with a total of 39 wickets leading Kerala to the semi-finals for the first time.

The young medium pacer made his List A debut for Kerala in the 2011–12 Vijay Hazare Trophy on 20 February 2012] followed by his first-class debut after two years in the 2014–15 Ranji Trophy on 7 December 2014 against Goa. He made his Twenty20 debut for Kerala in the 2017–18 Zonal T20 League on 11 January 2018.

He is an employee of the State Bank of Travancore and has represented the cricket team of the same in the 2014 BCCI Corporate Trophy.

In August 2018, he was one of eight players that were fined by the Kerala Cricket Association, after showing dissent against Kerala's captain, Sachin Baby.

He was recalled to the Kerala team for the 2019-20 Ranji Trophy; four years after his first-class debut but failed to impress.

He played for KCA Lions in the 2020-21 KCA President's Cup T20. He played for Masters CC in the 2021 KCA T20 Club Championship.
