= Sushant Marathe =

Indian cricketer

Sushant Marathe (born 16 October 1985) is an Indian former domestic cricketer who played for the Mumbai cricket team.

He is a powerful wicketkeeper batsman and came into limelight during the BCCI Corporate Trophy where he played alongside the likes of Yuvraj Singh, Suresh Raina and Robin Uthappa and single-handedly guided his team Air-India Red to victory in the semi-finals.

He was also used as an opening batsman by Mumbai cricket team in the Vijay Hazare Trophy and was the highest scorer for them in the 2009-2010 tournament. Prior to this he captained the Mumbai U-22 team and led them to victory in the 2007-2008 C. K. Nayudu Trophy.

He was one of the contracted players for Mumbai Indians in 2010 Indian Premier League but didn't get a chance to showcase his talent given the starpower in the Mumbai lineup.

For 2011 Indian Premier League he was contracted by Kochi Tuskers Kerala.

In the 2011–2012 season he topped the batting averages for Mumbai in the Syed Mushtaq Ali Trophy. On the basis of this performance after dissolution of Kochi Tuskers Kerala, he got new contract from Mumbai Indians for 2012 Indian Premier League

He was also one of the leading scorers in Mumbai Club Cricket in 2012–2013 season scoring as many as 7 hundreds and on the basis on his performances made it back to the Mumbai Ranji team, a spot that he had lost due to injury a year before.

He has started off the 2013–2014 season on a high note again having recently achieved the highest ever score in Kanga League history when he made 232* playing for Cricket Club of India. He recently broke the record of the most runs scored in a single season in the Kanga League.

In the Padmakar Talim Shield limited overs tournament, playing for Cricket Club of India at Brabourne Stadium, he scored 222 not out helping his side score 353 in 45 overs.

In 2016, Sushant began his MBA at London Business School. Post his MBA he worked for the FMCG multinational Kraft Heinz and since 2020 has been working for Amazon
