= Indian cricket team in England in 1932 =

International cricket tour

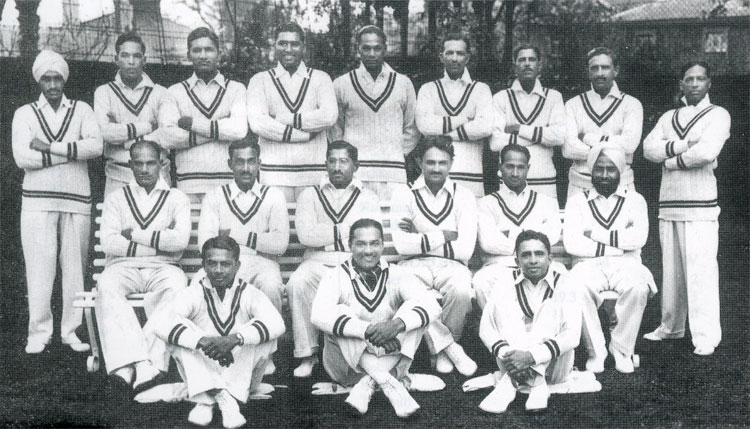
The touring Indian team

The Indian cricket team toured England in the 1932 season under the title of "All-India". They were captained by the Maharaja of Porbandar. It was the national team's second tour of England following the one in 1911. India had just been granted the status of ICC Full Member and they played their inaugural Test match at Lord's in June. It was the only Test arranged on this tour and England won by 158 runs after scoring 259 and 275/8d in the two innings while India were bowled out for 189 and 187.

India played 37 matches on the tour, including 26 first-class fixtures. Because of bad weather, two of their minor fixtures were abandoned without a ball being bowled. The team won nine first-class matches, drew nine and lost eight. The schedule was heavy with the team rarely out of action from the first match on 29 April to the last on 10 September. Wisden Cricketers' Almanack (Wisden) commented on this factor as something Indian cricketers of the time were simply not used to. As a result, the team suffered badly with muscle and tendon injuries which meant they became less effective as a team in their later matches.

India's outstanding batsman was the right-handed C. K. Nayudu, who played in all the first-class matches, scoring 1,618 runs at an average of 40.45, including five centuries and a highest score of 162. In the 1933 edition of Wisden, Nayudu was selected as one of the five Cricketers of the Year for 1932. India had a fine pair of opening bowlers in Amar Singh (111 wickets in first-class matches at 20.37) and Mohammad Nissar (71 wickets at 18.09). Amar Singh took ten wickets in a match three times and had a best innings return of 8/90.

== Indian tour squad ==
- Maharaja of Porbandar (captain)
- K. S. G. Limbdi (vice-captain)
- C. K. Nayudu (Test captain)
- Amar Singh
- Sorabji Colah
- Ghulam Mohammad
- Shankarrao Godambe
- M. Jahangir Khan
- Joginder Singh
- Bahadur Kapadia (wk)
- Lall Singh
- Nariman Marshall
- Mohammad Nissar
- Naoomal Jeoomal
- Janardan Navle (wk)
- S. Nazir Ali
- Phiroze Palia
- S. Wazir Ali

Ramachandra Guha, commenting on the selection, said that it "nicely reflected the balance of communal interests". There were seven Hindus, four Muslims, four Parsees and two Sikhs. A number of players, including Vijay Merchant, refused to participate because of unrest at home and in support of Mahatma Gandhi who had been arrested in January 1932. Porbandar was the nominal captain but he played little and Nayudu was the de facto captain. In the times when only Royals used to be Captains, the Maharja of Porbandar official Captain and the official vice-captain Raja of Limbdi both stood down, in rare gesture of sportsmanship and cause of India for the Test match so that more talented Nayudu could lead the team. Thus due to their sacrifice of posts, the 1st Captain to lead India in Test series is recorded as C K Nayudu

== Test series ==
=== Only Test ===
25–28 June 1932
Scorecard
Wisden summary

England	v	India
259 (105.1 overs); D. R. Jardine 79; Mohammad Nissar 5/93 (26 overs)		189 (93 overs); C. K. Nayudu 40; W. E. Bowes 4/49 (30 overs)
275/8d (110 overs); D. R. Jardine 85; M. Jahangir Khan 4/60 (30 overs)		187 (59.3 overs); L. Amar Singh 51; W. R. Hammond 3/9 (5.3 overs)

England won by 158 runs
Lord's
Umpires: F. Chester (Eng) and J. Hardstaff Sr (Eng)

- England won the toss and decided to bat
- 3-day Test

=== Teams in batting order ===
England: P. Holmes, H. Sutcliffe, F. E. Woolley, W. R. Hammond, D. R. Jardine (captain), E. Paynter, L. E. G. Ames (wk), R. W. V. Robins, F. R. Brown, W. Voce, W. E. Bowes.

India: J. G. Navle (wk), Naoomal Jeoomal, S. Wazir Ali, C. K. Nayudu (captain), S. H. M. Colah, S. Nazir Ali, P. E. Palia, Lall Singh, M. Jahangir Khan, L. Amar Singh, Mohammad Nissar.

== First-class matches ==
In addition to the Lord's Test, India played in 25 first-class matches. They visited all 17 County Championship teams for 19 matches (Glamorgan and Lancashire twice). Their other six first-class opponents were Marylebone Cricket Club (MCC), Cambridge University, Oxford University, Scotland (at Forthill, Dundee), an England XI (at Cheriton Road, Folkestone) and H. D. G. Leveson Gower's XI (at North Marine Road Ground, Scarborough in the Scarborough Festival).

Two Indian players who were unavailable for India played against them. These were Duleepsinhji and Iftikhar Ali Khan Pataudi who were both England players. They represented their counties, Sussex and Worcestershire respectively. The third and final day of the match against MCC in May was lost to the weather and the result was a draw, but Nayudu had shown his quality with an innings of 118 not out, scoring more than half of his team's runs. Guha said it was his best innings of the tour and he hit a six which sent the ball so far that it "was last seen leaving the Home of Cricket in an easterly direction".

Apart from England, India's strongest opponents were county champions Yorkshire. The Indians met them at St George's Road, Harrogate from 16 to 19 July and were defeated by a six-wicket margin. Yorkshire didn't field their strongest team (for example, Herbert Sutcliffe didn't play) and they were reduced to ten batsmen by a first day injury to Maurice Leyland. Yorkshire won the toss and decided to field. India, with a top score of 48 by Naoomal Jaoomal, were all out for 160 on the Saturday, Hedley Verity taking five for 65. Yorkshire were 14 for two at the close and declared at 161 for eight on Monday. India were then taken apart by George Macaulay and Verity. Macaulay achieved a career-best eight for 21. India's second innings lasted only 25 overs and they were all out for 66. Remarkably, that total included a half-century as Nazir Ali scored 52; the next best score was 5 – the number of extras. Yorkshire with 68 for four rounded things off on the Tuesday morning.

Far from being demoralised by their experience in Harrogate, the Indians went straight down to Lord's for the match against Middlesex from 20 to 22 July. It ended in a draw but the Indians opened with 409 for seven declared and forced Middlesex to follow on. Jaoomal and Nayudu both scored centuries. India's injury problems took their toll as the tour neared completion. At Folkestone in September, they lost to the England XI, which was by no means a Test-standard team, by an innings and 40 runs. Their last match in England was the Scarborough Festival game against Leveson Gower's XI and they were again struggling but this time saved by the weather, the match ending as a draw after the whole of the second day's play was lost.

== Other matches ==
India played in thirteen minor matches against several opponents, travelling as far north as Elgin for one match. Fifteen minor matches had been scheduled but two, in Aldershot and Sunderland, were completely lost to bad weather. The latter of those was a match against Durham, then a member of the Minor Counties Cricket Championship. India played against four other minor counties.

They lost only one of the minor matches, conceding a surprisingly heavy defeat at West Park, West Bridgford in a two-day match against Sir Julien Cahn's XI by an innings and 26 runs. Apart from Cahn himself, his team was near enough county strength. It included Walter Robins, Denijs Morkel, Len Richmond and George Heane.

== Aftermath ==
Wisden summarised the tour as one of "immense value to the Indians themselves who, about the middle of the summer, were fifty per cent better than when they arrived, and the lessons they learned will no doubt be passed on to the Indian cricketers of the future". India's next Test match in December 1933, their first at home, was against England to commence a three-match series which England won 2–0. Nayudu and Jardine were again the team captains.

== Annual reviews ==
- Wisden. Caine, C. Stewart (ed.). Wisden Cricketers' Almanack, 70th edition (1948 ed.). London: John Wisden & Co. Ltd.
