= Bahadur Kapadia =

Indian cricketer

Personal information
- Full name: Bahadur Edulji Kapadia
- Born: 9 April 1900; Bombay, British India
- Died: 1 January 1973 (aged 72); Bombay, India
- Batting: Right-handed
- Role: Wicket-keeper

Domestic team information
- Years: Team
- 1920–21 to 1935–36: Parsees

Career statistics
Competition	First-class
Matches	30
Runs scored	522
Batting average	13.73
100s/50s	0/2
Top score	59
Catches/stumpings	47/24
- Source: ESPNcricinfo, 23 February 2018

Bahadur Edulji Kapadia (9 April 1900 – 1 January 1973) was an Indian cricketer who played first-class cricket from 1920 to 1935.

== Career ==
Kapadia was a wicket-keeper and a useful lower middle-order batsman. As India's reserve wicketkeeper to Janardan Navle on their first Test touring team in 1932, his opportunities were limited. He played most of his first-class cricket for the Parsees in the Bombay Quadrangular from 1920–21 to 1935–36, and was a member of their championship-winning teams in 1922–23 and 1928–29.
