= Pardeep Sahu =

Indian cricketer

Personal information
- Born: 21 August 1985 (age 41); Bhiwani, Haryana, India
- Batting: Right-handed
- Bowling: Leg break googly
- Role: Bowling all-rounder

Domestic team information
- Years: Team
- 2002/03–2011/12: Haryana
- 2016: Kings XI Punjab
- Source: ESPNcricinfo

Pardeep Sahu (born 21 August 1985) is an Indian former cricketer who played for Kings XI Punjab in the Indian Premier League.

== Life and career ==
Since making his first-class debut in 2002 at the age of 17, Sahu made sporadic appearances for Haryana in domestic cricket until 2011. In 2012, he shifted to Mumbai and worked as an auditor for Comptroller and Auditor General of India. In a Kanga League Division A match in November 2014, Sahu took all ten wickets in an innings, becoming the fourth bowler to do so in the league.

Sahu was bought at the 2015 IPL players auction by Rajasthan Royals for ₹10 lakh, but did not play in any of the matches that season. At the 2016 IPL players auction, he was picked by Kings XI Punjab at the same price. In January 2018, he was bought by the Kings XI Punjab in the 2018 IPL auction.
