= Hormasji Kanga =

Indian cricketer

Personal information
- Born: 9 April 1880; Bombay, India
- Died: 29 December 1945 (aged 65); Bombay, India
- Batting: Right-handed
- Bowling: Right-arm medium
- Role: All-rounder

Domestic team information
- Years: Team
- 1899/1900–1921/22: Parsees

Career statistics
Competition	First-class
Matches	43
Runs scored	1,905
Batting average	26.83
100s/50s	3/5
Top score	233
Balls bowled	1410
Wickets	37
Bowling average	20.56
5 wickets in innings	1
10 wickets in match	0
Best bowling	8/14
Catches/stumpings	32/3
- Source: ESPNcricinfo, 27 July 2018

Dr Hormasji Dorabji Kanga also known as HD Kanga (9 April 1880 – 29 December 1945) was an Indian cricketer who played first-class cricket for the Parsis (sometimes spelt Parsees) cricket team between 1899 and 1921 as an all-rounder and opening batsman. He was the first Indian to score a double century in a first-class match, and the Kanga Cricket League is named after him. His older twin brothers Dinshaw and MD also played first-class cricket for Parsees.

== Career ==
In his cricketing career, Kanga played 43 first-class matches between 1899 and 1921. In a match between Parsis and a European cricket team at the Deccan Gymkhana Ground, Kanga scored his career best score of 233. In doing so, he became the first Indian to score a double century in a first-class match. In 1911, Kanga was part of the All Indian team that toured the British Isles; the team played a number of county cricket and other first-class teams. Kanga also played for the Hampstead Cricket Club in England.

After his retirement, Kanga was the President of the Bombay Cricket Association 1930–31 and 1934–35, and was also vice-president of the Board of Control for Cricket in India from 1936 until his death in 1945.

== Legacy ==
In 1948, three years after his death, the Bombay Cricket Association created the Kanga Cricket League, a monsoon season cricket tournament that they named after Hormasji Kanga.
