= Mehli Irani =

Indian cricketer (1930–2021)

Personal information
- Full name: Mehli Dinshaw Irani
- Born: 26 June 1930; Bombay, British Raj
- Died: 3 April 2021 (aged 90); Dubai, United Arab Emirates
- Batting: Left-handed
- Role: Batsman, wicket-keeper

Domestic team information
- Years: Team
- 1952–1953: Bombay

Career statistics
Competition	FC
Matches	4
Runs scored	99
Batting average	19.80
100s/50s	0/1
Top score	68
Balls bowled	10
Wickets	0
Bowling average	–
5 wickets in innings	–
10 wickets in match	–
Best bowling	–
Catches/stumpings	–/–
- Source: ESPNcricinfo, 12 February 2018

Mehli Dinshaw Irani (26 June 1930 – 3 April 2021) was an Indian cricketer, who played as a left-handed batsman and wicket-keeper. Irani played in the Kanga Cricket League for over 50 years. He made one appearance for Bombay in the Ranji Trophy, and also played club cricket for Bombay University and Parsee Cyclists.

== Career ==
Irani was a left-handed batsman and wicket-keeper. He captained the St. Xavier's College cricket team, and later played club cricket for Bombay Gymkhana and Parsee Cyclists. At Bombay Gymkhana, Irani played alongside Rohan Gavaskar, the son of Test cricketer Sunil Gavaskar.

In December 1951, Irani played for Bombay University in a match against the Marylebone Cricket Club. In the match, he played alongside Madhusudan Patil, the father of Test cricketer Sandeep Patil. In the 1952–53 season, Irani captained a Bombay University team that included five future Test match players: (Nari Contractor, Naren Tamhane, Chandrakant Patankar, Gundibail Sunderam and Ramnath Kenny). In one match captained by Irani, five catches were dropped in the opening over. The Bombay University team won that year's Rohinta Barion Trophy, after defeating Delhi in the final. In 1953, Irani made his only appearance in the Ranji Trophy, playing for Bombay in a match against Baroda. He was out lbw to Vijay Hazare for 17. Irani's team-mate Shishir Hattangadi said that Irani was disappointed to have only ever played one Ranji Trophy match.

Irani played in the Kanga Cricket League, a monsoon season cricket tournament, for 57 years, starting in 1949. He described the difficulty of batting in the tournament: "A person who gets 30 or 40 runs is as good as getting a 50 or a 100 when you play on a dry wicket, the uncertainty of the wicket added to Kanga League’s beauty." He played for Parsee Cyclists, and took over the captaincy of the side from Nari Contractor. In 1991, Irani stumped Sachin Tendulkar in a Kanga League match. Irani played as a wicket-keeper even in his 60s, before retiring from cricket at the age of 69.

== Personal life and death ==
At Bombay Cricket Club, Irani was nicknamed the "centre table man". Irani was married to Dhanu, and they had two daughters. He continued to attend Bombay Gymkhana cricket matches even after his retirement, until he moved to Dubai in December 2020 to be near one of his daughters. Irani died on 3 April 2021 in Dubai, and his death was announced by the Mumbai Cricket Association. His funeral was held the next day.
