= Chandra Tejas =

Indian cricketer (born 1984)

Chandra Tejas (born 7 November 1984) is an Indian cricketer. He is a right-handed batsman and right-arm off-break bowler who plays for Kerala. He was born in Kannur.

Between 1999 and 2007, Tejas played for Kerala's youth cricket teams from Under-14 level to Under-25 level.

Tejas made a single first-class appearance for the side, during the 2007-08 Ranji Trophy season, against Tripura. From the lower-middle order, he scored 19 runs in the first innings in which he batted, and 6 not out in the second.

Tejas played for Cordiant Sports Foundation in a Twenty20 tournament during the 2007–08 season, helping the team reach the final. He helped the same team win the final of a 45-over competition the following season, and played in a Cricket Association tournament with a Kerala-based team who reached the final before being comprehensively beaten by Uttar Pradesh.
