= Joginder Singh (cricketer, born 1980) =

Indian cricketer (born 1980)

Personal information
- Born: 11 July 1980 (age 46); Delhi, India
- Batting: Right-handed
- Bowling: Right-arm medium

Domestic team information
- Years: Team
- 2009/10–2010/11: Delhi
- List A debut: 10 February 2010 Delhi v Jammu and Kashmir
- Last List A: 18 February 2011 Delhi v Services
- Twenty20 debut: 20 October 2009 Delhi v Jammu and Kashmir
- Last Twenty20: 13 March 2011 Delhi v Tamil Nadu

Career statistics
Competition	LA	T20
Matches	7	9
Runs scored	96	32
Batting average	32.00	16.00
100s/50s	0/1	0/0
Top score	52*	24*
Balls bowled	276	114
Wickets	3	3
Bowling average	67.33	44.00
5 wickets in innings	0	0
10 wickets in match	0	0
Best bowling	1/26	1/3
Catches/stumpings	0/0	0/0
- Source: ESPNcricinfo, 12 July 2013

Joginder Singh (born 11 July 1980) is an Indian former cricketer who played for Delhi. He was born in Delhi. He was brought by Delhi Daredevils for the 2010 Indian Premier League.
