= Doraiswamy Subramanian =

Indian cricketer (born 1984)

Personal information
- Full name: Doraiswamy Subramanian
- Born: 18 February 1984 (age 42); Mumbai, India
- Batting: Right-handed
- Bowling: Right-arm medium
- Role: Batsman

Domestic team information
- Years: Team
- 2012/13-2013/14: Mumbai
- Source: CricketArchive, 20 May 2016

Doraiswamy Subramanian (born 18 February 1984) is an Indian cricketer who played for Mumbai. He is a right-handed batsman. He was named in Hung Hom JD Jaguars to play in Hong Kong T20 Blitz a domestic Twenty20 tournament in Hong Kong.
