= Josh Mangan =

Australian cricketer

Tony harvey
Personal information
- Full name: Joshua Patrick Mangan
- Born: 15 January 1986 (age 40); Leongatha, Victoria, Australia
- Batting: Right-handed
- Bowling: Right-arm leg spin
- Role: Bowler

Domestic team information
- Years: Team
- 2008–2009: Western Australia

Career statistics
Competition	FC
Matches	4
Runs scored	115
Batting average	23.00
100s/50s	0/0
Top score	38
Balls bowled	378
Wickets	3
Bowling average	79.33
5 wickets in innings	0
10 wickets in match	0
Best bowling	2/102
Catches/stumpings	2/-
- Source: ESPN Cricinfo, 11 January 2015

Joshua Patrick Mangan (born 15 January 1986) is an Australian cricketer.

Originally from Rutherglen, Victoria, Mangan represented Australia at the 2004 ICC Under-19 Cricket World Cup. He was recruited by Western Australia in mid 2006 to replace Beau Casson, who had moved to New South Wales.

He made his first-class debut in 2008, and played a further two games that summer, but only one game the following season.

Mangan was not offered a contract after the 2009/10 season, but continued to play in the Western Australian Grade Cricket for the University Cricket Club, where he was captain in 2013. He studied at University of Western Australia to become an architect.
