= Padmakar Chury =

Indian cricketer (1909–1970)

Personal information
- Full name: Padmakar Jagannath Chury
- Born: 9 June 1909; Bombay, India
- Died: 19 May 1970 (aged 60); Bombay, India
- Source: ESPNcricinfo, 27 February 2017

Padmakar Chury (9 June 1909 – 19 May 1970) was an Indian cricketer. He played in the final of the 1934–35 Ranji Trophy for Bombay.
