= Jay Bista =

Indian cricketer (born 1995)

Personal information
- Full name: Jay Gokul Bista
- Born: 23 December 1995 (age 30); Mumbai, Maharashtra, India
- Batting: Right-handed
- Bowling: Right-arm off break
- Role: Batting all-rounder

Domestic team information
- Years: Team
- 2014/15–2019/20: Mumbai
- 2020/21–present: Uttarakhand
- Source: ESPNcricinfo

Jay Bista (born 23 December 1995) is an Indian cricketer who plays for Uttarakhand in domestic cricket. He is a batting all-rounder who bats right-handed and bowls right-arm off break. He represented Mumbai at the Under-16 and Under-19 levels before making his first-class cricket debut in November 2015 during the 2015–16 Ranji Trophy. He made his List A debut on 10 December 2015 in the 2015–16 Vijay Hazare Trophy. He scored his maiden first-class century on 6 March 2016 in the 2015–16 Irani Cup.

== Personal life ==
Born in Mumbai, Bista hails from Dhangadhi, a town in Nepal on the border of Uttar Pradesh. His family moved to Mumbai long before he was born. Bista studied at Sharadashram Vidyamandir in Mumbai. His father Gokul Bista played cricket for Mumbai University.

On becoming the first person of Nepalese origin to play for Mumbai, Bista said, "My roots could be from Nepal but I am a hardcore Mumbaikar, who is born and brought up in Mumbai."
