= Bibhudutta Panda =

Odia cricketer

Personal information
- Born: 14 March 1989 (age 36); Cuttack, Odisha, India
- Batting: Right-handed
- Bowling: Right-arm medium
- Source: ESPNcricinfo, 3 May 2022

Bibhudutta Panda (born 14 March 1989) is an Indian cricketer. He is a right-handed opening bowler and lower order batsman. In first class cricket, he plays for Odishain Ranji Trophy and Katak Barabati Tigers in first edition of Odisha Premier League. In 2nd OPL he played for team Dhauli.
