= Herbert Trevor =

English cricketer

Brigadier-General Herbert Trevor CMG DSO
- Born: Herbert Edward Trevor; 16 December 1871; Paddington, London, England
- Died: 23 March 1939 (aged 67); Kemp Town, Sussex, England
- Cricket career

Cricket information
- Batting: Unknown

Domestic team information
- Years: Team
- 1908: Sussex
- 1892/93: Bombay

Career statistics
Competition	First-class
Matches	3
Runs scored	51
Batting average	12.75
100s/50s	–/–
Top score	22*
Balls bowled	–
Wickets	–
Bowling average	–
5 wickets in innings	–
10 wickets in match	–
Best bowling	–
Catches/stumpings	1/–
- Source: ESPNcricinfo, 1 July 2012

Herbert Edward Trevor CMG DSO (16 December 1871 – 23 March 1939) was a British Army officer and an English cricketer. Trevor's batting style is unknown. He was born at Paddington, London.

While in the British Raj in December 1892, Trevor was selected to play in Bombay's inaugural first-class match against Lord Hawke's XI at the Bombay Gymkhana. Lord Hawke's XI won the toss and elected to bat first, making 263 all out. In response, Bombay made 157 all out, with Trevor being dismissed for 12 runs by Arthur Gibson. Forced to follow-on in their second-innings, Bombay made 140 all out, setting Lord Hawke's XI a target of 35 for victory. They reached their target with 8 wickets to spare. He later made two first-class appearances for Sussex in the 1908 County Championship, against Kent at the St Lawrence Ground, Canterbury, and Essex at the County Ground, Leyton. He scored 39 runs in his two matches, with a high score of 22 not out.

Trevor served with the King's Own Yorkshire Light Infantry in the First World War. He was awarded the Distinguished Service Order, and was made a Companion of the Order of St Michael and St George in the 1918 New Year Honours. He was on 3 July 1916 appointed as Neville Cameron's successor as general officer commanding (GOC) of a brigade of the 34th Division and was granted the temporary rank of brigadier general while employed in this position.

He died at Kemp Town, Sussex, on 23 March 1939, at the age of 67.
