= Tinashe Ruswa =

Zimbabwean cricketer

Personal information
- Full name: Tinashe Paradzayi Ruswa
- Born: 17 February 1985 (age 41); Harare, Zimbabwe
- Batting: Right-handed
- Bowling: Right-arm off-break
- Role: Bowler

Domestic team information
- Years: Team
- 2002/03: Manicaland
- 2003/04: Mashonaland

Career statistics
Competition	First-class	List A
Matches	8	6
Runs scored	108	4
Batting average	15.42	4.00
100s/50s	0/0	0/0
Top score	40*	4
Balls bowled	721	162
Wickets	12	3
Bowling average	39.25	39.66
5 wickets in innings	0	0
10 wickets in match	0	0
Best bowling	3/56	2/42
Catches/stumpings	4/–	0/–
- Source: CricketArchive, 19 January 2015

Tinashe Paradzayi Ruswa (born 17 February 1985) is a former Zimbabwean cricketer who played for Manicaland and Mashonaland during the early 2000s.

From Harare, Ruswa represented Zimbabwe at the 2000 Under-15s World Challenge, held in England, and was also a part of several other underage representative sides. An off-spinner, he played a single One Day International (ODI) for the Zimbabwean national under-19 side at the 2004 Under-19 World Cup in Bangladesh. He conceded 29 runs from two overs against New Zealand in a match that Zimbabwe won easily, on its way to sixth place at the tournament (As of 2015, its best finish). Ruswa had earlier made his first-class debut for Manicaland at the age of 17, playing twice in the 2002–03 season of the Logan Cup.

In domestic competition, Ruswa switched to Mashonaland for the 2003–04 season. He went on to play six matches in the limited overs Faithwear Clothing Inter-Provincial competition, but only took. Ruswa had slightly more success in the Logan Cup, where he also played six matches. Against Matabeleland, he took 3/56, his best first-class bowling figures, and then scored 40 not out, his highest first-class score, from tenth in the batting order. Mashonaland's next match against Midlands, Ruswa's final at first-class level, was notable for the performance of Tatenda Taibu, the side's captain. He scored 175 not out in his team's second innings and then, helping Mashonaland to a 329-run victory, took 8/43 in Midland's second innings, despite having kept wicket in the first. After the conclusion of his playing career in Zimbabwe, Ruswa studied information systems at the University of the Western Cape in South Africa, also playing club cricket there. He later attended the University of Durham in England on a scholarship, receiving his master's degree in 2011.
