= Karimuttathu Rakesh =

Indian cricketer (born 1983)

Personal information
- Born: 12 May 1983 (age 43); Thiruvalla, Kerala
- Batting: Left-handed
- Bowling: Right-arm offbreak
- Role: Allrounder

Domestic team information
- Years: Team
- 2006–2013: Kerala
- Source: ESPNcricinfo, 20 June 2021

Karimuttathu Jagadeesapanicker Rakesh (born 12 May 1983) is an Indian cricketer who plays for the Kerala cricket team in domestic cricket.
