= Arvind Apte =

Indian cricketer (1934–2014)

Personal information
- Full name: Arvindrao Laxmanrao Apte
- Born: 24 October 1934; Bombay, British India
- Died: 5 August 2014 (aged 79); Pune, Maharashtra, India
- Batting: Right-handed
- Bowling: Right-arm medium

International information
- National side: India
- Only Test (cap 92): 2 July 1959 v England

Career statistics
| Competition | Test | First-class |
|---|---|---|
| Matches | 1 | 58 |
| Runs scored | 15 | 2,782 |
| Batting average | 7.50 | 33.51 |
| 100s/50s | 0/0 | 6/15 |
| Top score | 8 | 165 |
| Balls bowled | – | 102 |
| Wickets | – | 2 |
| Bowling average | – | 38.00 |
| 5 wickets in innings | – | 0 |
| 10 wickets in match | – | 0 |
| Best bowling | – | 1/21 |
| Catches/stumpings | 0/– | 14/1 |
- Source: ESPNcricinfo, 20 November 2022

Arvindrao Laxmanrao Apte (24 October 1934 – 5 August 2014) was an Indian cricketer who played in one Test in 1959 against England at Leeds. His brother Madhav Apte was also a cricketer.

== See also ==
- One Test Wonder
