= Pallam Anfal =

Indian cricketer (born 1990)

Personal information
- Full name: Pallam Muhammed Anfal
- Born: 4 September 1990 (age 36); Pallam, Kerala, India
- Source: ESPNcricinfo, 22 November 2016

Pallam Anfal (born 4 September 1990) is an Indian first-class cricketer who plays for Kerala. He made his first-class debut for Kerala in the 2012–13 Ranji Trophy on 15 December 2016.
