= Bellipadi Chandrahasa Alva =

Indian cricketer

B. C. Alva
Personal information
- Full name: Bellipadi Chandrahasa Alva
- Born: 23 September 1923; Puttur, South Canara, Madras Presidency, British India
- Died: 6 November 1982 (aged 59); Bangalore, Karnataka, India
- Batting: Right-handed
- Bowling: Right-arm medium
- Role: All-rounder

Domestic team information
- Years: Team
- 1944/45–1954/55: Madras
- 1957/58–1958/59: Mysore

Career statistics
Competition	First-class
Matches	40
Runs scored	1488
Batting average	25.65
100s/50s	3/6
Top score	141
Balls bowled	5,453
Wickets	74
Bowling average	29.04
5 wickets in innings	4
10 wickets in match	0
Best bowling	6/111
Catches/stumpings	22/–
- Source: ESPNcricinfo, 9 November 2011

Bellipadi Chandrahasa Alva (23 March 1923 – 6 November 1982), commonly known as B. C. Alva, was an Indian cricketer who played domestic cricket for Madras and Mysore cricket teams and represented India in two unofficial Test matches.

== Early life ==
Alva was born on 23 September 1923 in Puttur in South Canara, Madras Presidency. He had his schooling at St. Aloysius College, Mangalore and graduated in mathematics and engineering from St. Aloysius College, Bangalore and the Guindy Engineering College, Madras. Alva worked as Chief Engineer, Bangalore Electricity Board and was Chairman of the Bhakra Beas Management Board, Chandigarh.

== Cricket career ==
Alva was a good middle-order batsman, medium-pace bowler and slip fielder. He represented Madras from 1944–45 to 1954–55 and captained the team in Ranji Trophy for three seasons. He also played for Mysore in 1957–58 and 1958–59. He was a part of the Indian national cricket team for two unofficial tests against Commonwealth XI in 1951–52.

== Death ==
Alva died at Bangalore of abdominal cancer on 6 November 1982.
