= Jignesh Sanghani =

Indian cricketer (born 1962)

Personal information
- Full name: Jignesh Indravadan Sanghani
- Born: 3 February 1962; Bombay, India
- Batting: Right-handed
- Source: ESPNcricinfo, 25 November 2016

Jignesh Sanghani (born 3 February 1962) is an Indian first-class cricketer who represented Mumbai(then Bombay). He made his first-class debut for Mumbai in the 1982–83 Ranji Trophy on 18 December 1982.
