= Nikhil Rathod =

Indian cricketer (born 1984)

Personal information
- Full name: Nikhil Rathod
- Born: 3 September 1984 (age 42); RAJKOT, Gujarat
- Batting: Right-handed
- Bowling: Right-arm legbreak
- Role: Batsman All Rounder

Domestic team information
- Years: Team
- Saurashtra

Career statistics
Competition	FC	LA	T20
Matches	10	8	1
Runs scored	294	232	17
Batting average	19.60	38.66	17.00
100s/50s	0/0	0/2	0/0
Top score	43	77*	17
Catches/stumpings	8/–	3/–	0/–
- Source: ESPNcricinfo profile, 22 April 2016

Nikhil Rajendrakumar Rathod (born 3 September 1984) is an Indian cricketer. He is a right-handed legbreak bowler and was a member of the Indian U-19 cricket team at the 2004 ICC Under-19 Cricket World Cup. he's also in cricket administration as CEO of franchises in various ICC, BCCI approved leagues.
