= Kanakkatharaparambu Sreejith =

Indian cricketer (born 1986)

Personal information
- Full name: Kanakkatharaparambu Ramachandran Sreejith
- Born: October 27, 1986 (age 40); Kochi, Kerala
- Batting: Right-handed
- Bowling: Slow left-arm orthodox
- Role: Bowler

Domestic team information
- Years: Team
- Kerala
- Source: ESPNcricinfo

Kanakkatharaparambu Ramachandran Sreejith (born 27 October 1986) is an Indian cricketer who plays for Kerala. He is a right handed batsman and a slow left arm orthodox bowler.
