= Uday Merchant =

Indian cricketer

Cricket information
- Batting: Right-handed

Career statistics
Competition	First-class
Matches	42
Runs scored	2,789
Batting average	55.78
100s/50s	9/12
Top score	217
Balls bowled	18
Wickets	0
Bowling average	–
5 wickets in innings	–
10 wickets in match	–
Best bowling	–
Catches/stumpings	44/0
- Source: CricketArchive

Udaykant Madhavji Merchant (14 August 1916 – 7 February 1985) was an Indian first class cricketer.

The brother of Test player Vijay Merchant, Uday was a right-handed batsman and played in the Ranji Trophy for Bombay. He played a total of 22 first class matches for Bombay, scoring 1758 runs at 67.61.

Merchant's highest score of 217 was made against Hyderabad in the 1947–48 Ranji Trophy semi-final.
