= L. P. Jai =

Personal information
- Full name: Laxmidas Purshottamdas Jai
- Born: 1 April 1902; Bombay, Bombay Presidency, British India
- Died: 29 January 1968 (aged 66); Bombay, Maharashtra, India
- Nickname: Lallubhai
- Batting: Right-handed
- Role: Batsman

International information
- National side: India (1933)
- Only Test (cap 13): 15 December 1933 v England

Domestic team information
- Years: Team
- 1920–1941: Hindus
- 1926–1941: Bombay

Career statistics
Competition	Test	First-class
Matches	1	67
Runs scored	19	3,231
Batting average	9.50	31.99
100s/50s	0/0	6/19
Top score	19	156
Balls bowled	–	210
Wickets	–	3
Bowling average	–	44.66
5 wickets in innings	–	0
10 wickets in match	–	0
Best bowling	–	1/6
Catches/stumpings	0/–	26/–
- Source: ESPNcricinfo, 13 May 2020

Laxmidas Purshottamdas Jai (1 April 1902 – 29 January 1968) was a major figure in Indian cricket between the wars.

Jai was born in a Gujarati family in Bombay. Jai was a graceful right-handed stroke-player. Most of his finer innings came in the Bombay Quadrangular competition. He captained Bombay to the title in the first-ever Ranji Trophy championship.

Because of the Hindu Gymkhana's opposition in protest against the jailing of Indian political leaders, Jai along with Vijay Merchant and Champak Mehta were unavailable for trial matches to select the Indian team that toured England in 1932. The tour included India's first ever Test match. His only Test was the first ever in India. He toured England in 1936 but a broken finger restricted his appearances.

He was a selector in the 1950s, before resigning over a dispute during the 1958/59 series against West Indies. The trophy awarded to the scorer of the fastest hundred in Ranji trophy every season was named after him.

== Career ==
As was the case with cricketers prior to commercial sponsorships, Jai was employed by the Imperial Bank of India, later State Bank of India, by way of a job for life. This helped to nurture his hobby, philately. He became an eminent philatelist, being in a position to "rescue" every stamped envelope that came to the bank every day. He specialised in British Empire stamps.

== Family/Personal Life ==
Jai was married to Kanta. They had two children. His son Shashikant is a businessman in Nairobi and his daughter Purnima Zaveri is a renowned singer.

Jai died on 29 January 1968 in Bombay from cardiac arrest.
