= Madhav Apte =

Indian cricketer (1932–2019)

Madhav Apate

Sheriff of Mumbai
- In office 1984–2019
- Preceded by: Sohrab Pirojsha Godrej

Personal details
- Born: Madhavrao Laxmanrao Apte; 5 October 1932 Bombay, Bombay Presidency, British India
- Died: 23 September 2019 (aged 86) Breach Candy Hospital, Mumbai, India
- Relatives: Arvind Apte (brother)
- Education: Mumbai University, Elphinstone College
- Cricket career

Cricket information
- Batting: Right-handed
- Bowling: Right-arm bowler

International information
- National side: India
- Test debut (cap 64): 13 November 1952 v Pakistan
- Last Test: 28 March 1953 v West Indies

Domestic team information
- Years: Team
- Bombay
- Bengal

Career statistics
Competition	Test	First-class
Matches	7	67
Runs scored	542	3,336
Batting average	49.27	38.79
100s/50s	1/3	6/16
Top score	163*	165*
Balls bowled	6	120
Wickets	0	4
Bowling average	–	24.25
5 wickets in innings	–	0
10 wickets in match	–	0
Best bowling	–	1/6
Catches/stumpings	2/–	27/–
- Source: ESPNcricinfo, 20 November 2022

Madhavrao Laxmanrao Apte ( 5 October 1932 – 23 September 2019) was an Indian cricketer who played in seven Test matches from 1952 to 1953. He was elected to the office of the president of the Cricket Club of India in 1989. He afterwards served as the president of the club's Legend's Club and was the chairman of his family's company, Apte Group. His brother Arvind Apte was also a cricketer. He was a former Sheriff of Mumbai.

== Early life ==
Apte was born on 5 October 1932 into the Chitpavan Brahmin household of Laxmanrao Apte. His paternal grandfather had set up textile mills and sugar factories as the family business. He attended the Children's Academy before it was taken over by the Government of India, after which he moved to the Scottish Presbyterian Wilson High School, where he was encouraged to play cricket.

Apte finished his Bachelor of Arts degree at Mumbai University and finished his graduate degree in fine arts at Elphinstone College.

== Career ==
Apte, although a right-hand batsman by trade, began his career in 1948 as a leg spin bowler under the coaching of Vinoo Mankad while he was a student at Elphinstone College. In 1951, at the age of 19, he made his first-class debut playing for Indian Universities against the touring Marylebone Cricket Club.

In 1952, at the age of 20, he played his first Ranji trophy against the Saurashtra cricket team after Vijay Merchant dropped out due to injuries. That same year, he was selected as a replacement to the Bombay team after Pankaj Roy, and made his national cricket debut against the Pakistan team that season. He also played one season (1957/58) for Bengal.

In 1953, Apte was selected for India's tour to West Indies, where at Port-of-Spain, he finished as the second highest scorer for India after Polly Umrigar. He played in only one first-class match in 1954, after which he was never selected on the national Indian team again. He maintained that his being dropped was "an unsolved mystery". Later on, in his autobiography, he states that soon after his run in the West Indies, his father was approached by chief selector Lala Amarnath for a share of the New Delhi base of their family's business, Kohinoor Mills. After his father politely declined the selector, Apte was never selected to represent India again. He joined his family's business and officially retired from international cricket at the age of 34, although he continued to play first class cricket. His last first-class game was the 1967–68 Ranji Trophy final between Bombay and Madras.

Apte is the only cricket player to have played alongside D. B. Deodhar and Sachin Tendulkar. In 1989, he became the president of the Cricket Club of India and awarded Tendulkar playing membership, and in 2016, argued that the Cricket Club of India was a founding member of the Board of Control for Cricket in India after the controversial Lodha Committee report proposed to consign the club as an associate member of the Board, and thus taking away the voting rights of the former's members as part of the reformation process at the latter. He was the president of the club's Legends Club, and in 2014, urged the club to make the Anandji Dossa reference library available to the public.

In December 1983, Apte was selected to become the Sheriff of Mumbai. In 2011, he inaugurated the 26th Sportstar Trophy. In 2015, at the age of 82, he published his autobiography titled As Luck Would Have It at Wankhede Stadium at the hands of Sunil Gavaskar.

In business, Apte served as the president of the Mumbai Chamber of Commerce. He served as the chairman of the Apte Group.

== Personal life ==
Apte's younger brother Arvind Apte, also played first-class cricket for Bombay, Rajasthan and Indian Universities. While his son, Vaman Apte represented India in squash and Mumbai University in cricket, and his daughter was an inter-school badminton champion.

He died at the Breach Candy Hospital on the morning of 23 September 2019 aged 86.

== Publications ==
- Apte, Madhav (2015). As Luck Would Have It (1st ed.). Mumbai: Global Cricket School. ISBN 978-8193130308.
- Apte, Madhav (2016). Daivayattam (in Marathi) (1st ed.). Rajhans Prakashan. p. 300. ISBN 978-8174349460.
