= Ken Skewes =

Australian cricketer (born 1984)

Kenneth James Skewes (born 30 November 1984) is an Australian former cricketer who played for South Australia.

Skewes plays his Grade cricket for the Woodville District Cricket Club and in 2008 was instrumental in the club's first premiership success for 30 years, scoring 122 not out and taking 5 wickets in the Grand Final against West Torrens at the Adelaide Oval.

The following summer, despite losing his South Australia contract, Skewes had another solid season for Woodville. He scored 49 in Woodville's second consecutive Grand Final win, this time against Northern Districts.
