= Alok Mehta =

Indian broadcaster journalist

- Born: 7 September 1952 (age 73); Ujjain, Madhya Bharat, India
- Occupations: Journalist and writer
- Writing career
- Genres: Books, journalistic articles and reviews
- Notable works: "Naman Narmada – Obeisance to Narmada","Patrakarita ki Laxman rekha"," Bharat Me Patrakarita". "Safar Suhana Duniya Ka", "Nami Chehre Yadgar Mulakaten"
- Notable awards: Padam Shri
- Website: alokmehta.in

Alok Mehta (born 7 September 1952) is an Indian journalist, TV broadcaster and writer . In 2009, he received the civilian honour of Padma Shri from the Government of India. Mehta's work has focused on issues of social welfare, including education for minorities and healthcare facilities.

== Career ==
Mehta worked as the Hindi editor at the Voice of Germany in Cologne from 1979 to 1982 . He then worked as a coordinating editor and correspondent for Voice of America based at Delhi for 10 years .

Mehta has edited a number of publications, including the Hindi Outlook, the Nav Bharat Times, the Nai Dunia, the Dainik Bhaksar, the National Duniya and Governance Now Hindi. In 2002 he launched Hindi Outlook Saptahik.

He was known for his coverage in the Nav Bharat Times on con man Chandra Swami, Jail Singh and V.P. Singh. The front-page story in NBT, as to how the president's house during Gyani Jail Singh tenure, had become a den of terrorists is still included in list of rare stories on the block. As for Chnadra Swami, the conman, Alok Mehta stood his ground despite legal threats as well as dire consequence for his life, namely, would be run over by a truck. As Executive Editor of Hindusatan Mr. Mehta broke the Diary of Govindacharya in which he called Atal Bihari Vajpayee MUKHOTA .. As Editor of Hindi Outlook he carried major cover story exposing Baba Ramdev about his medicines and business, long before he came to national scene . In Hindi Outlook he carried investigative stories on Taj Express way and other Scandals . In Nai Dunia Delhi Edition Mr. Mehta exposed Shanti Bhushan property controversy of Allahabad and very critical views on Arvind Kejariwal Movement .

He served Editors Guild of India as president for 2 years and secretary general for 4 years. Besides, he has been a member of the National Integration Council, Press Council of India, and a trustee of the Raja Rammohan Roy Library Foundation, National Library advisory board, and Prem Bhatia Memorial Trust, Kusumanjali Foundation .

Mehta interviewed a number of well-known public figures, including Indira Gandhi, Rajiv Gandhi, and Helmut Kohl.

His awards include Padam Shri, D.Lit. by Vikram University - Ujjain, Bahrtendu Harishchandra Award by Government of India, Ganesh Shankar Vidhyarthy Award of Kendriya Hindi Sanstahn of Govt. of India, Patrakarita Bhushan Award of U.P. Government, Patrakar Sahityakar Samman of Hindi Akademi Delhi, Haldighati Samman, Sharad Joshi Samman of M.P. Government for literary and Journalism work, Delhi National Harmony Awards for Journalism, National Tulsi Award.

He was trained by Voice of America at Chiang Mai in February 2000 in video journalism. He is associated with Talent Media Network as Editorial Director.

== Bibliography ==
- "Naman Narmada- Obeisance to Narmada Publisher: Shubhi Publications
- Social Reforms In India
- कलम के सेनापति SAMAYIK PRAKASHAN
- "पत्रकारिता की लक्ष्मण रेखा" (2000), SAMAYIK PRAKASHAN
- Indian Journalism Keeping it clean Publisher : Rupa & CO.,
- सफर सुहाना दुनिया का (Travelogue OF 40 Countries) SAMAYIK PRAKASHAN
- चिड़िया फिर नहीं चहकी (कहानी संग्रह),
- Bird did not Sing Yet Again (Collections of Short Stories)
- भारत के राष्ट्रपति ( From Rajendra Prasad to Pratibha Patil )
- नामी चेहरे यादगार मुलाकातें ( Interviews of Prominent personalities)
- तब और अब (COMMENTS ON SOCIO POLITICAL ISSUES), Publisher: Kitabghar Prakashan
- स्मृतियाँ ही स्मृतियाँ (TRAVELOGUES OF INDIA AND EUROPE), Publisher: Parag Prakashan
