= Shankarrao Godambe =

Indian cricketer

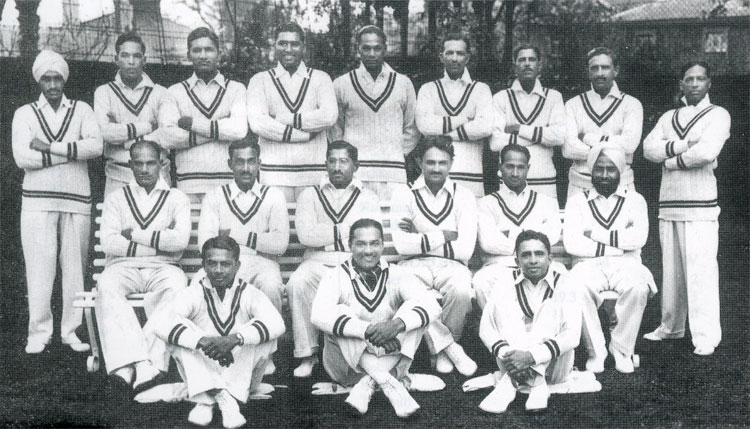
- The 1932 Indian touring team in England. Godambe is standing third from right.

Personal information
- Full name: Shankarrao Ramachandra Godambe
- Born: 1 March 1899; Bombay, British India
- Died: 6 December 1969 (aged 70); Bombay, India
- Batting: Right-handed
- Bowling: Right-arm medium

Domestic team information
- Years: Team
- 1920/21–1941/42: Hindus
- 1934/35–1937/38: Gujarat
- 1939/40: Bombay

Career statistics
Competition	First-class
Matches	50
Runs scored	848
Batting average	16.30
100s/50s	0/4
Top score	62
Balls bowled	6,203
Wickets	103
Bowling average	22.86
5 wickets in innings	4
10 wickets in match	1
Best bowling	6/32
Catches/stumpings	49/–
- Source: Cricinfo, 21 February 2018

Shankarrao Ramachandra Godambe (1 March 1899 – 6 December 1969) was an Indian cricketer who played first-class cricket from 1920 to 1941.

Godambe was a medium-pace seam bowler and useful late-order batsman who had a long career for the Hindus in the Bombay Quadrangular. After doing well in the trial matches in 1931-32 he was selected to tour England with India's first Test touring team in 1932. However, he was unable to make the most of his infrequent opportunities on tour and did not play in the Test match.

He scored 62 (his highest score) and 51 not out when the Hindus beat the Europeans in the final of the 1925-26 Bombay Quadrangular. His best bowling figures were 6 for 32, after taking 4 for 42 in the first innings, to help the Hindus to victory over the Parsees in the 1929–30 final.
