= Praful Waghela =

Indian cricketer (born 1984)

Personal information
- Born: 19 November 1984 (age 41); Mumbai, India
- Source: ESPNcricinfo, 4 January 2017

Praful Waghela (born 19 November 1984) is an Indian cricketer. He made his first-class debut for Mumbai in the 2009–10 Ranji Trophy on 8 December 2009.
