= Onkar Khanvilkar =

Indian cricketer (born 1982)

Personal information
- Full name: Onkar Jagannath Khanvilkar
- Born: 8 September 1982; Bombay, India
- Batting: Left-handed
- Bowling: Right-arm offbreak
- Source: ESPNcricinfo, 24 November 2016

Onkar Khanvilkar (born 8 September 1982) is an Indian first-class cricketer who represented Mumbai. He made his first-class debut for Mumbai in the 2003-04 Ranji Trophy on 23 November 2003.
