= Chandrushekar Avinash =

Indian cricketer (born 1987)

KC Avinash
Personal information
- Full name: Kempaiah Chandrushekar Avinash
- Born: 23 June 1987 (age 39); Bangalore, Karnataka, India
- Batting: Right-handed
- Role: Wicket-keeper

Domestic team information
- Years: Team
- 2012/13-2014/15: Karnataka
- Source: CricketArchive, 22 May 2016

Kempaiah Chandrushekar Avinash (born 23 June 1987) is an Indian cricketer who plays for Karnataka cricket team as well as Mangalore United. He is a right-hand wicket-keeper batsman.
