= Badre Alam =

Indian cricketer (born 1992)

Badre Alam (born 7 May 1992) is an Indian first-class cricketer who plays for Mumbai.
