= Atul Mehta =

Indian cricketer

Personal information
- Full name: Atul Manibhai Mehta
- Born: 13 December 1949 (age 76); Rangoon, Burma
- Batting: Right-handed
- Bowling: Right-arm leg-spin

Domestic team information
- Years: Team
- 1967/68–1968/69: Saurashtra
- 1969/70–1970/71: Bombay
- 1975/76–1980/81: Gujarat

Career statistics
Competition	FC	List A
Matches	46	1
Runs scored	1530	42
Batting average	25.08	42.00
100s/50s	2/6	0/0
Top score	141	42
Balls bowled	3839	12
Wickets	51	0
Bowling average	34.82	–
5 wickets in innings	0	0
10 wickets in match	0	n/a
Best bowling	4/48	–
Catches/stumpings	44/–	0/–
- Source: ESPNcricinfo, 24 February 2022

Atul Manibhai Mehta (born 13 December 1949) is a former Indian cricketer who played first-class cricket between 1967 and 1981.

Mehta was born in Rangoon, Burma, where his parents owned a business. A batsman and leg-spin bowler, he played Ranji Trophy cricket for Saurashtra, Bombay and Gujarat.

Mehta played in Bombay's victory in the Ranji Trophy final in 1970–71, scoring valuable runs in the lower order in the 48-run victory over Maharashtra. His highest score was 141 for Gujarat against Maharashtra in 1980–81. He was the leading scorer in the low-scoring match with 40 and 37 when Gujarat beat Bombay by 225 runs in 1977–78.

Mehta moved to the United States in the 1980s. He owns a motel in California.
