= Vithal Patil =

Indian cricketer (1927–2014)

Personal information
- Born: 30 June 1927; Bombay, India
- Died: 10 June 2014 (aged 86); Mumbai, India
- Source: ESPNcricinfo, 20 April 2016

Vithal Patil (30 June 1927 – 10 June 2014) was an Indian cricketer. He played two first-class matches for Mumbai between 1956 and 1958. He also played in the Kanga League between 1952 and 1984, taking a record 759 wickets.
