= Janardan Navle =

Indian cricketer (1902–1979)

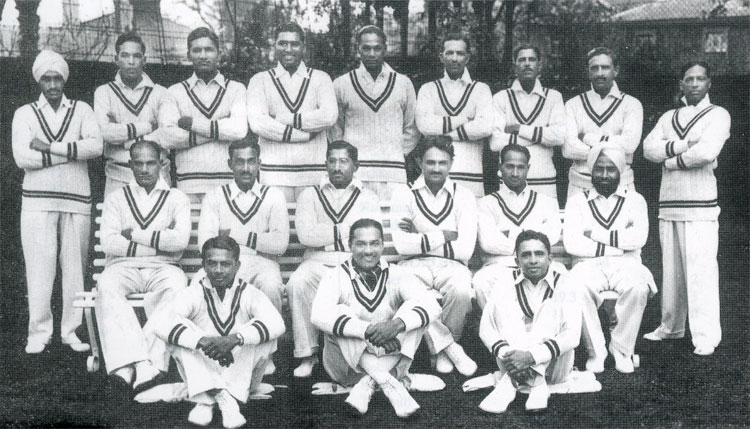
- The 1932 Indian Test Cricket team that toured England. Janardan Navle is seen standing last in the first row of the team captained by Maharaja of Porbandar.

Personal information
- Full name: Janardan Gyanoba Navle
- Born: 7 December 1902; Fulgaon, British India
- Died: 7 September 1979 (aged 76); Pune, Maharashtra, India
- Batting: Right-handed
- Role: Wicket-keeper

International information
- National side: India (1932–1933)
- Test debut (cap 6): 25 June 1932 v England
- Last Test: 15 December 1933 v England

Career statistics
Competition	Test	First-class
Matches	2	65
Runs scored	42	1,976
Batting average	13.00	19.18
100s/50s	0/0	0/9
Top score	13	96
Catches/stumpings	1/0	100/36
- Source: ESPNcricinfo, 10 May 2020

Janardan Gyanoba Navle (pronounced Nuw-lay) (7 December 1902 – 7 September 1979) was an early Indian Test cricketer.

== Career ==
Navle faced the historic first delivery of India's first Test innings in 1932. He opened in both innings at Lord's in 1932 and also kept wickets. A small man, Wisden called him "a first-rate wicket-keeper, very quick in all that he did". He played for Indians against Arthur Gilligan's MCC team in 1926–27 and Jack Ryder's Australians nine years later. For many years he kept wickets for Hindus in the Bombay Quadrangular and Pentangular tournaments. He made his debut for Hindus at the age of 16.

== Personal life ==
Navle hailed from a Marathi family. He did his schooling from Bhave School in Pune, Maharashtra. In his later life he worked as a security guard in a sugar mill and lived in a two-room flat. He died in Pune on 7 September 1979.
