= Shishir Hattangadi =

Indian cricketer (born 1961)

Personal information
- Full name: Shishir Shantaram Hattangadi
- Born: 30 July 1961 (age 65); Calcutta, West Bengal, India
- Batting: Right-handed
- Bowling: Right-arm off break
- Role: Opening batsman

Domestic team information
- Years: Team
- 1981/82–1991/92: Bombay

Career statistics
Competition	FC	List A
Matches	60	3
Runs scored	3,722	87
Batting average	43.78	29.00
100s/50s	10/21	0/0
Top score	186	45
Balls bowled	366	–
Wickets	4	–
Bowling average	36.00	–
5 wickets in innings	0	–
10 wickets in match	0	n/a
Best bowling	2/14	–
Catches/stumpings	60/–	0/–
- Source: ESPNcricinfo, 3 January 2016

Shishir Shantaram Hattangadi (born 30 July 1961) is a former Indian first-class cricketer who played for Bombay cricket team from 1981/82 to 1991/92. He worked as a selector for the Mumbai Cricket Association after retirement and also as Head of Cricket with the Mumbai Indians.

== Life and career ==
Hattangadi studied at the St. Mary's School, Mumbai and Podar College. He had scored 323 not out in an inter-collegiate final at the Wankhede Stadium. He was coached in his early career by Vasant Amladi and Vithal Patil.

He went on to make his first-class debut at the age of 19. He played as an opening batsman, opening the innings with Sunil Gavaskar on several occasions in the Mumbai team. In a career that lasted 11 seasons, Hattangadi made over 3000 runs including 10 centuries and was the captain for several matches. He retired from cricket at the age of 29, after he "stopped enjoying the game".

Hattangadi became a selector for the Mumbai Cricket Association but resigned from the post in 2009. He worked as the Head of Cricket for Deccan Chargers in 2008, before taking up the same position with the Mumbai Indians in 2009. He also wrote columns for the media.
