= Rajesh Verma (cricketer) =

Indian cricketer (1981–2022)

Personal information
- Full name: Rajesh Pratap Verma
- Born: 11 December 1981; Bombay, Maharashtra, India
- Died: 24 April 2022 (aged 40); Thane, Maharashtra, India
- Batting: Right-handed
- Bowling: Right-arm Medium

Domestic team information
- Years: Team
- Kolkata Knight Riders
- Mumbai cricket team
- Source: ESPNcricinfo, 24 November 2016

Rajesh Verma (11 December 1981 – 24 April 2022) was an Indian first-class cricketer who played for Mumbai. He made his first-class debut for Mumbai in 2002.

== Career ==
He made his first class debut in 2002–03, and played his last first class match in 2008, against Punjab in Brabourne Stadium.

== Death ==
He died due to Heart attack on April 24, 2022.
