= Vijay Merchant =

Indian cricketer (1911–1987)

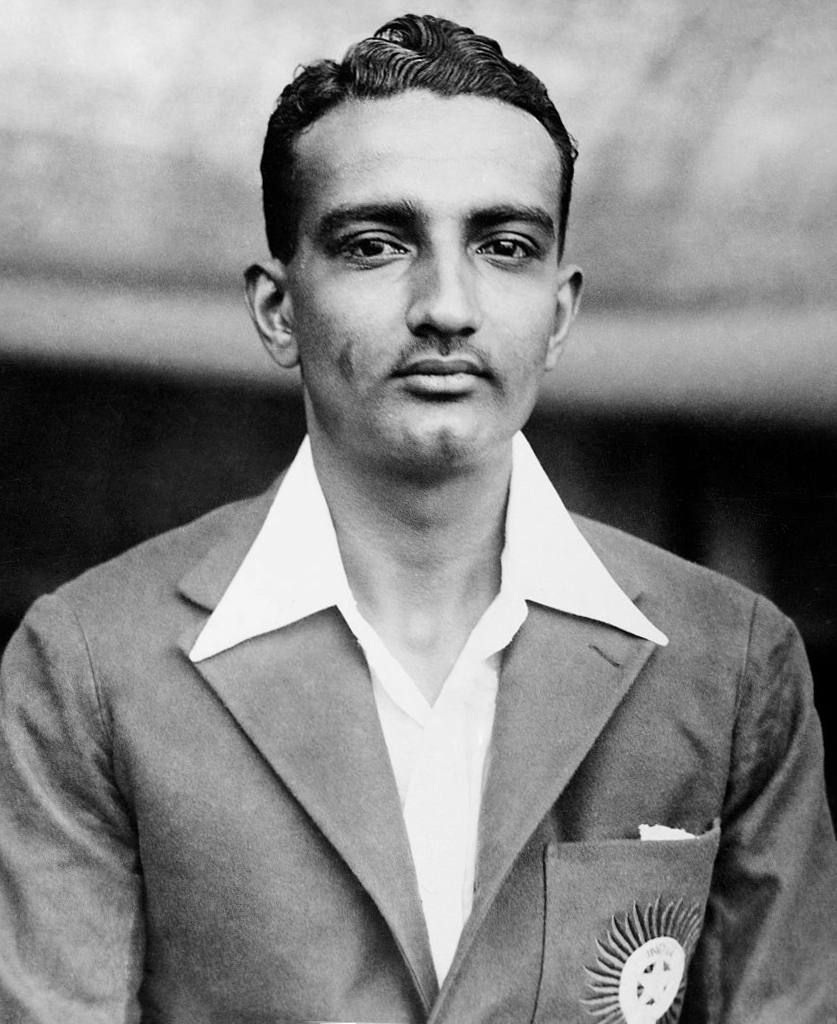
- Vijay Merchant in 1936

Personal information
- Full name: Vijay Singh Madhavji Merchant
- Born: 12 October 1911; Bombay, Bombay Presidency, British India
- Died: 27 October 1987 (aged 76); Bombay, Maharashtra, India
- Batting: Right-handed
- Bowling: Right-arm medium
- Role: Batsman

International information
- National side: India (1933–1951)
- Test debut (cap 15): 15 December 1933 v England
- Last Test: 2 November 1951 v England

Domestic team information
- Years: Team
- 1929–1951: Bombay

Career statistics
Competition	Tests	First-class
Matches	10	150
Runs scored	859	13470
Batting average	47.72	71.64
100s/50s	3/3	45/52
Top score	154	359*
Balls bowled	54	5,087
Wickets	0	65
Bowling average	–	32.12
5 wickets in innings	0	1
10 wickets in match	0	0
Best bowling	–	5/73
Catches/stumpings	7/–	115/–
- Source: ESPNcricinfo, 21 March 2019

Vijay Singh Madhavji Merchant, (born Vijay Madhavji Thackersey; 12 October 1911 – 27 October 1987) was an Indian cricketer. A right-hand batsman and occasional right-arm medium pace bowler, Merchant played first-class cricket for Bombay cricket team as well as 10 Test matches for India between 1929 and 1951. Behind his limited Test appearances, he dominated Indian domestic cricket – his batting average of 71.64 is the second highest first-class average in history, behind only that of Don Bradman. He is regarded as the founder of the Bombay School of Batsmanship, that placed more importance on right technique, steely temperament, and conservative approach rather than free flow of the bat.

His international career included two tours of England upon which he scored over 800 runs. English cricketer C. B. Fry exclaimed "Let us paint him white and take him with us to Australia as an opener." His brother, Uday, also played first-class cricket.

Besides cricket, he was also associated with the Hindoostan Spinning & Weaving Mills (Thackersey Group) and was the Sheriff of Bombay in 1970.

== Domestic cricket ==
Merchant was born in Bombay, into a wealthy Gujarati family in 1911. He was an "outstanding college cricketer" who captained Sydenham College, while studying there; his success for Sydenham led to selection for Hindus cricket team during the 1929 Bombay Quadrangular. He also continued to play for Sydenham and in 1931 he set the record in Bombay inter-collegiate cricket by scoring 504 runs and taking 29 wickets. His continued success in domestic cricket resulted in the call to the India national team to play against the visiting English team at Bombay Gymkhana, which was also the first Test to be played on Indian soil.

Throughout his career, Merchant was involved in a rivalry with the other great Indian batsman of the era, Vijay Hazare, with each trying to better the scores of the other. In the 1943 Bombay Pentangular final against the Rest, Merchant bettered Hazare's tournament record score of 248, set in the previous match against the Muslims, with 250 not out. Hazare responded with a 309 out of a team total of 387 in the same match. Less than a month later, Merchant topped that by amassing 359 not out against Maharashtra in the Ranji Trophy, setting a then record for the highest score in Indian first-class cricket.

== International career ==
Merchant's Test career spanned 18 years but during that time he played only ten Test matches, and was unfortunate that some of the best years of his career were lost to the Second World War, when no international cricket was played. He also missed tours to Australia and the West Indies due to poor health. However, Merchant went out to score 154 in his last Test match against England in Delhi, which was also his highest Test score. A shoulder injury incurred while fielding in that game forced him to retire. All ten matches of Merchant's Test career were against England.

Merchant had a particularly successful England tour of 1946. Despite facing difficulty against swing bowling when the ball moved away after pitching on the leg stump, he scored 2,385 runs including seven centuries in the 41 innings he batted, at an average of 74.53. In his column, former cricketer Learie Constantine wrote, "... this (Merchant) world-beater so adapted himself to the circumstances that he produced cricket of the highest class, never refusing the challenge to score when the dice was not too heavily loaded against the side."

Merchant went on to become a cricket administrator, broadcaster, writer and national selector, and charitable advocate of the handicapped.

== Cricket with Vijay Merchant ==
"Cricket with Vijay Merchant" was a radio programme hosted by Merchant. It was broadcast on Sunday afternoons, on Vividh Bharati, Anu D. Aggarwal quotes a survey, which revealed that it was one of the most listened to sponsored programmes.

== Legacy ==
Although Merchant played only ten Test matches, he is widely considered to be one of the greatest batsmen of his era. He was an attractive stroke maker, who "developed fine footwork, and built a stroke repertoire featuring a lovely cut, grasscutting drives, a delicate glance and late-cut, and, until later in his career, a brilliant hook stroke." His batting average in first-class cricket was 71.64, putting him second only to Don Bradman of Australia. In India's domestic Ranji Trophy matches, Merchant fared even better, averaging 98.75 in 47 innings. His record is especially impressive as his runs came at a time of uncovered wickets. He was one of the five Wisden Cricketers of the Year in 1937. Merchant is also the oldest Indian player to score a Test century. He scored 154 when he was 40 years 21 days during England's 1951–52 tour of India.

During his career, Merchant scored eleven double-centuries in first-class cricket, the most by an Indian batsman. The record stood until November 2017, when Cheteshwar Pujara scored his twelfth double-century batting for Saurashtra against Jharkhand in the 2017–18 Ranji Trophy.

The Board of Control for Cricket in India named its under-16 domestic cricket tournament Vijay Merchant Trophy in his honour.
