= 2025–26 Syed Mushtaq Ali Trophy =

Indian cricket tournament

2025-26 Syed Mushtaq Ali Trophy
- Dates: 26 November – 18 December 2025
- Administrator: BCCI
- Cricket format: T20
- Tournament format(s): Round robin, Super league then knockout
- Champions: Jharkhand (1st title)
- Runners-up: Haryana
- Participants: 38
- Matches: 141
- Player of the series: Anukul Roy (Jharkhand)
- Most runs: Ishan Kishan (Jharkhand) (517)
- Most wickets: Ashok Sharma (Rajasthan) (22)
- Official website: Syed Mushtaq Ali Trophy Elite; Syed Mushtaq Ali Trophy Plate

The 2025–26 Syed Mushtaq Ali Trophy was the 18th edition of the Syed Mushtaq Ali Trophy, an annual Twenty20 tournament in India. The tournament took place from 26 November to 18 December 2025 and featured all 38 teams from the Ranji Trophy. The teams were divided into four elite groups, consisting of eight teams each, and one plate group comprising six teams. The tournament was a part of the 2025–26 Indian domestic cricket season, as announced by the Board of Control for Cricket in India (BCCI) in 2025. Mumbai were the defending champions.

== Format ==
The teams were divided into two categories: one named the Elite category, which had 32 teams split into four groups, and one called the Plate category, which had 6 teams in one group. The Elite category teams played each other once, with the top two teams from each group qualifying for the super league. In the Plate Group, teams also played each other once, but the top two teams qualify for the Plate Group final. The Plate winner was promoted to the Elite group for the next season, 2026-27, while the bottom one team of all four Elite groups combined, factoring in both points and the nrr, was relegated to the Plate group.

Points system
Match result	Points earned
Win	4
No Result	2
Loss	0

== Participants ==
Group A	Group B	Group C	Group D	Plate Group
Mumbai	Madhya Pradesh	Baroda	Delhi	Manipur
Vidarbha	Uttar Pradesh	Bengal	Saurashtra	Mizoram
Andhra	Chandigarh	Gujarat	Rajasthan	Meghalaya
Kerala	Jammu & Kashmir	Punjab	Jharkhand	Nagaland
Railways	Hyderabad	Haryana	Karnataka	Sikkim
Assam	Maharashtra	Himachal Pradesh	Tamil Nadu	Arunchal Pradesh
Chhattisgarh	Goa	Services	Uttarakhand	-
Odisha	Bihar	Pondicherry	Tripura	-

== Progression ==
Team	Group Matches							Super League			Final
Team	1	2	3	4	5	6	7	1	2	3	Final
Group A
Mumbai	4	8	12	16	16	20	24	0	4	8	X
Vidarbha	0	0	4	8	8	8	12	X			
Andhra	4	8	8	12	16	20	20	0	4	8	X
Kerala	4	4	8	8	12	12	12	X			
Railways	0	4	8	8	8	12	12	X			
Assam	0	4	4	4	8	8	12	X			
Chhattisgarh	4	4	4	4	4	4	8	X			
Odisha	0	0	0	4	8	12	12	X			
Group B
Madhya Pradesh	0	4	8	8	12	16	16	4	4	4	X
Uttar Pradesh	4	8	8	8	12	12	12	X			
Chandigarh	4	4	8	8	8	8	12	X			
Jammu & Kashmir	4	4	8	12	12	12	16	X			
Hyderabad	4	4	8	12	16	20	20	4	8	8	X
Maharashtra	0	4	4	8	8	12	16	X			
Goa	0	4	4	8	12	16	16	X			
Bihar	0	0	0	0	0	0	4	X			
Group C
Baroda	0	0	4	8	12	12	16	X			
Bengal	4	8	8	12	16	16	16	X			
Gujarat	4	4	8	12	12	16	16	X			
Punjab	4	4	8	8	12	16	20	0	0	4	X
Haryana	0	4	4	8	12	16	20	4	4	8	L
Himachal Pradesh	0	4	4	4	4	4	4	X			
Services	0	0	4	4	4	4	4	X			
Pondicherry	4	8	8	8	8	12	16	X			
Group D
Delhi	0	4	8	8	12	12	16	X			
Saurashtra	4	4	4	4	4	8	8	X			
Rajasthan	4	8	12	16	20	24	24	0	0	0	X
Jharkhand	4	8	12	16	20	24	28	4	8	8	W
Karnataka	4	4	4	8	8	8	8	X			
Tamil Nadu	0	0	4	4	8	8	12	X			
Uttarakhand	0	4	4	4	4	8	8	X			
Tripura	0	0	0	4	4	4	8	X			
Plate Group
Manipur	4	8	8	8	8	X					
Mizoram	4	4	8	12	16	X					W
Meghalaya	4	4	8	8	8	X					
Nagaland	0	4	4	8	12	X					
Sikkim	0	4	8	12	16	X					L
Arunchal Pradesh	0	0	0	0	0	X					

Note:

Win =
Loss =
No Result =

== Points table ==
=== Group A ===
Pos	Team	Pld	W	L	NR	Pts	NRR	Qualification
1	Mumbai	7	6	1	0	24	2.004	Advance to Super League
2	Andhra	7	5	2	0	20	0.926	Advance to Super League
3	Railways	7	3	4	0	12	−0.038	
4	Kerala	7	3	4	0	12	−0.057	
5	Vidarbha	7	3	4	0	12	−0.282	
6	Odisha	7	3	4	0	12	−0.543	
7	Assam	7	3	4	0	12	−0.627	
8	Chhattisgarh	7	2	5	0	8	−1.144	

Source: ESPNcricinfo

=== Group B ===
Pos	Team	Pld	W	L	NR	Pts	NRR	Qualification
1	Hyderabad	7	5	2	0	20	1.423	Advance to Super League
2	Madhya Pradesh	7	4	3	0	16	0.935	Advance to Super League
3	Maharashtra	7	4	3	0	16	0.063	
4	Goa	7	4	3	0	16	−0.013	
5	Jammu & Kashmir	7	4	3	0	16	−0.538	
6	Uttar Pradesh	7	3	4	0	12	0.634	
7	Chandigarh	7	3	4	0	12	−1.092	
8	Bihar	7	1	6	0	4	−1.342	

Source: ESPNcricinfo

=== Group C ===
Pos	Team	Pld	W	L	NR	Pts	NRR	Qualification
1	Punjab	7	5	2	0	20	2.716	Advance to Super League
2	Haryana	7	5	2	0	20	0.409	Advance to Super League
3	Baroda	7	4	3	0	16	0.914	
4	Gujarat	7	4	3	0	16	−0.357	
5	Pondicherry	7	4	3	0	16	−0.532	
6	Bengal	7	4	3	0	16	−0.834	
7	Himachal Pradesh	7	1	6	0	4	−0.442	
8	Services	7	1	6	0	4	−1.823	

Source: ESPNcricinfo

=== Group D ===
Pos	Team	Pld	W	L	NR	Pts	NRR	Qualification
1	Jharkhand	7	7	0	0	28	1.976	Advance to Super League
2	Rajasthan	7	6	1	0	24	0.630	Advance to Super League
3	Delhi	7	4	3	0	16	0.086	
4	Tamil Nadu	7	3	4	0	12	−0.777	
5	Karnataka	7	2	5	0	8	0.678	
6	Saurashtra	7	2	5	0	8	−0.662	
7	Tripura	7	2	5	0	8	−0.915	
8	Uttarakhand	7	2	5	0	8	−0.993	

Source: ESPNcricinfo

=== Plate Group ===
Pos	Team	Pld	W	L	NR	Pts	NRR	Qualification
1	Sikkim	5	4	1	0	16	2.270	Advanced to the Plate Final
2	Mizoram	5	4	1	0	16	1.013	Advanced to the Plate Final
3	Nagaland	5	3	2	0	12	1.341	
4	Manipur	5	2	3	0	8	0.119	
5	Meghalaya	5	2	3	0	8	−0.514	
6	Arunchal Pradesh	5	0	5	0	0	−4.240	

Source: ESPNcricinfo

=== Super League Group A ===
Pos	Team	Pld	W	L	NR	Pts	NRR	Qualification
1	Haryana	3	2	1	0	8	2.325	Advanced to the Final
2	Hyderabad	3	2	1	0	8	−0.413	
3	Mumbai	3	2	1	0	8	−0.701	
4	Rajasthan	3	0	3	0	0	−1.472	

Source: ESPNcricinfo

=== Super League Group B ===
Pos	Team	Pld	W	L	NR	Pts	NRR	Qualification
1	Jharkhand	3	2	1	0	8	0.221	Advanced to the Final
2	Andhra	3	2	1	0	8	−0.113	
3	Madhya Pradesh	3	1	2	0	4	0.237	
4	Punjab	3	1	2	0	4	−0.347	

Source: ESPNcricinfo

== Round-robin ==
=== Group A ===
==== Round 1 ====
26 November 2025	Chhattisgarh; 133/9 (20 overs)	v	Vidarbha; 106 (19.1 overs)	Chhattisgarh won by 27 runs
09:00; Scorecard	Chhattisgarh; 133/9 (20 overs)	v	Vidarbha; 106 (19.1 overs)	Bharat Ratna Shri Atal Bihari Vajpayee Ekana Cricket Stadium B, Lucknow; Umpires: Akshay Totre and Bhavesh Patel; Player of the match: Ravi Kiran (Chhattisgarh)
09:00; Scorecard	Shashank Singh 34 (22); Yash Thakur 3/25 (4 overs)		Harsh Dubey 26 (22); Sourabh Majumdar 3/23 (4 overs)	Bharat Ratna Shri Atal Bihari Vajpayee Ekana Cricket Stadium B, Lucknow; Umpires: Akshay Totre and Bhavesh Patel; Player of the match: Ravi Kiran (Chhattisgarh)
Vidarbha won the toss and elected to field; Points: Chhattisgarh 4, Vidarbha 0				Bharat Ratna Shri Atal Bihari Vajpayee Ekana Cricket Stadium B, Lucknow; Umpires: Akshay Totre and Bhavesh Patel; Player of the match: Ravi Kiran (Chhattisgarh)

26 November 2025	Railways; 158/5 (20 overs)	v	Mumbai; 159/3 (15.5 overs)	Mumbai won by 7 wickets
11:00; Scorecard	Railways; 158/5 (20 overs)	v	Mumbai; 159/3 (15.5 overs)	Bharat Ratna Shri Atal Bihari Vajpayee Ekana Cricket Stadium, Lucknow; Umpires: Abhijit Bhattacharya and Kaushik Gandhi; Player of the match: Ajinkya Rahane (Mumbai)
11:00; Scorecard	Ashutosh Sharma 61 (30); Shivam Dube 1/11 (3 overs)		Ajinkya Rahane 62 (33); Rahul Sharma 2/43 (3.5 overs)	Bharat Ratna Shri Atal Bihari Vajpayee Ekana Cricket Stadium, Lucknow; Umpires: Abhijit Bhattacharya and Kaushik Gandhi; Player of the match: Ajinkya Rahane (Mumbai)
Mumbai won the toss and elected to field; Points: Mumbai 4, Railways 0				Bharat Ratna Shri Atal Bihari Vajpayee Ekana Cricket Stadium, Lucknow; Umpires: Abhijit Bhattacharya and Kaushik Gandhi; Player of the match: Ajinkya Rahane (Mumbai)

26 November 2025	Odisha; 176/7 (20 overs)	v	Kerala; 177/0 (16.3 overs)	Kerala won by 10 wickets
13:30; Scorecard	Odisha; 176/7 (20 overs)	v	Kerala; 177/0 (16.3 overs)	Bharat Ratna Shri Atal Bihari Vajpayee Ekana Cricket Stadium B, Lucknow; Umpires: Akshay Totre and Bhavesh Patel; Player of the match: Rohan Kunnummal (Kerala)
13:30; Scorecard	Biplab Samantray 53 (41); MD Nidheesh 4/35 (4 overs)		Rohan Kunnummal 121* (60); Sambit Baral 0/11 (1 over)	Bharat Ratna Shri Atal Bihari Vajpayee Ekana Cricket Stadium B, Lucknow; Umpires: Akshay Totre and Bhavesh Patel; Player of the match: Rohan Kunnummal (Kerala)
Kerala won the toss and elected to field; Points: Kerala 4, Odisha 0; Sanju Samson and Rohan Kunnummal (Kerala) made highest ever opening partnership in Syed Mushtaq Ali Trophy with 177 runs before Abhishek Sharma and Prabhsimran Singh (Punjab) breaking it later with 205 runs.				Bharat Ratna Shri Atal Bihari Vajpayee Ekana Cricket Stadium B, Lucknow; Umpires: Akshay Totre and Bhavesh Patel; Player of the match: Rohan Kunnummal (Kerala)

26 November 2025	Andhra; 143/9 (20 overs)	v	Assam; 114 (19.4 overs)	Andhra won by 29 runs
16:30 (D/N); Scorecard	Andhra; 143/9 (20 overs)	v	Assam; 114 (19.4 overs)	Bharat Ratna Shri Atal Bihari Vajpayee Ekana Cricket Stadium, Lucknow; Umpires: Abhijit Bhattacharya and Kaushik Gandhi; Player of the match: Ricky Bhui (Andhra)
16:30 (D/N); Scorecard	Ricky Bhui 46 (35); Mukhtar Hussain 4/20 (4 overs)		Pradyun Saikia 44 (43); Satyanarayana Raju 3/20 (4 overs)	Bharat Ratna Shri Atal Bihari Vajpayee Ekana Cricket Stadium, Lucknow; Umpires: Abhijit Bhattacharya and Kaushik Gandhi; Player of the match: Ricky Bhui (Andhra)
Assam won the toss and elected to field; Points: Andhra 4, Assam 0				Bharat Ratna Shri Atal Bihari Vajpayee Ekana Cricket Stadium, Lucknow; Umpires: Abhijit Bhattacharya and Kaushik Gandhi; Player of the match: Ricky Bhui (Andhra)

==== Round 2 ====
28 November 2025	Railways; 149/7 (20 overs)	v	Kerala; 117/8 (20 overs)	Railways won by 32 runs
09:00; Scorecard	Railways; 149/7 (20 overs)	v	Kerala; 117/8 (20 overs)	Bharat Ratna Shri Atal Bihari Vajpayee Ekana Cricket Stadium B, Lucknow; Umpires: Abhijit Bhattacharya and Kaushik Gandhi; Player of the match: Shivam Chaudhary (Railways)
09:00; Scorecard	Navneet Virk 32 (29); KM Asif 3/27 (4 overs)		Sanju Samson 19 (25); Atal Bihari Rai 3/23 (4 overs)	Bharat Ratna Shri Atal Bihari Vajpayee Ekana Cricket Stadium B, Lucknow; Umpires: Abhijit Bhattacharya and Kaushik Gandhi; Player of the match: Shivam Chaudhary (Railways)
Kerala won the toss and elected to field; Points: Railways 4, Kerala 0				Bharat Ratna Shri Atal Bihari Vajpayee Ekana Cricket Stadium B, Lucknow; Umpires: Abhijit Bhattacharya and Kaushik Gandhi; Player of the match: Shivam Chaudhary (Railways)

28 November 2025	Andhra; 184/7 (20 overs)	v	Odisha; 118 (17.2 overs)	Andhra won by 66 runs
11:00; Scorecard	Andhra; 184/7 (20 overs)	v	Odisha; 118 (17.2 overs)	Bharat Ratna Shri Atal Bihari Vajpayee Ekana Cricket Stadium, Lucknow; Umpires: Akshay Totre and Bhavesh Patel; Player of the match: Saurabh Kumar (Andhra)
11:00; Scorecard	Ricky Bhui 47 (29); Biplab Samantray 3/20 (4 overs)		Sourav Gouda 24 (16); Prithvi Raj 3/4 (2.2 overs)	Bharat Ratna Shri Atal Bihari Vajpayee Ekana Cricket Stadium, Lucknow; Umpires: Akshay Totre and Bhavesh Patel; Player of the match: Saurabh Kumar (Andhra)
Odisha won the toss and elected to field; Points: Andhra 4, Odisha 0				Bharat Ratna Shri Atal Bihari Vajpayee Ekana Cricket Stadium, Lucknow; Umpires: Akshay Totre and Bhavesh Patel; Player of the match: Saurabh Kumar (Andhra)

28 November 2025	Vidarbha; 192/9 (20 overs)	v	Mumbai; 194/3 (17.5 overs)	Mumbai won by 7 wickets
13:30; Scorecard	Vidarbha; 192/9 (20 overs)	v	Mumbai; 194/3 (17.5 overs)	Bharat Ratna Shri Atal Bihari Vajpayee Ekana Cricket Stadium B, Lucknow; Umpires: Abhijit Bhattacharya and Kaushik Gandhi; Player of the match: Ayush Mhatre (Mumbai)
13:30; Scorecard	Atharva Taide 64 (36); Shivam Dube 3/31 (4 overs)		Ayush Mhatre 110* (53); Yash Thakur 1/21 (2.5 overs)	Bharat Ratna Shri Atal Bihari Vajpayee Ekana Cricket Stadium B, Lucknow; Umpires: Abhijit Bhattacharya and Kaushik Gandhi; Player of the match: Ayush Mhatre (Mumbai)
Mumbai won the toss and elected to field; Points: Mumbai 4, Vidarbha 0; Ayush Mhatre (Mumbai) became youngest ever player to score a century in all three formats - First-class (FC), List A and Twenty20 (T20) at 18 years and 135 days.; Ayush Mhatre (Mumbai) became third youngest ever player to score a century in Twenty20 (T20) at 18 years and 135 days.				Bharat Ratna Shri Atal Bihari Vajpayee Ekana Cricket Stadium B, Lucknow; Umpires: Abhijit Bhattacharya and Kaushik Gandhi; Player of the match: Ayush Mhatre (Mumbai)

28 November 2025	Assam; 167/9 (20 overs)	v	Chhattisgarh; 119 (17.1 overs)	Assam won by 48 runs
16:30 (D/N); Scorecard	Assam; 167/9 (20 overs)	v	Chhattisgarh; 119 (17.1 overs)	Bharat Ratna Shri Atal Bihari Vajpayee Ekana Cricket Stadium, Lucknow; Umpires: Akshay Totre and Bhavesh Patel; Player of the match: Mukhtar Hussain (Assam)
16:30 (D/N); Scorecard	Sumit Ghadigaonkar 79 (49); Sourabh Majumdar 2/26 (4 overs)		Amandeep Khare 46 (42); Mukhtar Hussain 6/20 (4 overs)	Bharat Ratna Shri Atal Bihari Vajpayee Ekana Cricket Stadium, Lucknow; Umpires: Akshay Totre and Bhavesh Patel; Player of the match: Mukhtar Hussain (Assam)
Chhattisgarh won the toss and elected to field; Points: Assam 4, Chhattisgarh 0				Bharat Ratna Shri Atal Bihari Vajpayee Ekana Cricket Stadium, Lucknow; Umpires: Akshay Totre and Bhavesh Patel; Player of the match: Mukhtar Hussain (Assam)

==== Round 3 ====
30 November 2025	Assam; 132/7 (20 overs)	v	Railways; 135/7 (19.4 overs)	Railways won by 3 wickets
09:00; Scorecard	Assam; 132/7 (20 overs)	v	Railways; 135/7 (19.4 overs)	Bharat Ratna Shri Atal Bihari Vajpayee Ekana Cricket Stadium B, Lucknow; Umpires: Bhavesh Patel and Kaushik Gandhi; Player of the match: Karn Sharma (Railways)
09:00; Scorecard	Saahil Jain 38 (29); Karn Sharma 2/23 (4 overs)		Akshat Pandey 36 (47); Akash Sengupta 4/35 (3.4 overs)	Bharat Ratna Shri Atal Bihari Vajpayee Ekana Cricket Stadium B, Lucknow; Umpires: Bhavesh Patel and Kaushik Gandhi; Player of the match: Karn Sharma (Railways)
Railways won the toss and elected to field; Points: Railways 4, Assam 0				Bharat Ratna Shri Atal Bihari Vajpayee Ekana Cricket Stadium B, Lucknow; Umpires: Bhavesh Patel and Kaushik Gandhi; Player of the match: Karn Sharma (Railways)

30 November 2025	Chhattisgarh; 120 (19.5 overs)	v	Kerala; 121/2 (10.4 overs)	Kerala won by 8 wickets
11:00; Scorecard	Chhattisgarh; 120 (19.5 overs)	v	Kerala; 121/2 (10.4 overs)	Bharat Ratna Shri Atal Bihari Vajpayee Ekana Cricket Stadium, Lucknow; Umpires: Abhijit Bhattacharya and Akshay Totre; Player of the match: KM Asif (Kerala)
11:00; Scorecard	Amandeep Khare 41 (37); KM Asif 3/16 (3 overs)		Sanju Samson 43 (15); Ravi Kiran 1/26 (3 overs)	Bharat Ratna Shri Atal Bihari Vajpayee Ekana Cricket Stadium, Lucknow; Umpires: Abhijit Bhattacharya and Akshay Totre; Player of the match: KM Asif (Kerala)
Kerala won the toss and elected to field; Points: Kerala 4, Chhattisgarh 0				Bharat Ratna Shri Atal Bihari Vajpayee Ekana Cricket Stadium, Lucknow; Umpires: Abhijit Bhattacharya and Akshay Totre; Player of the match: KM Asif (Kerala)

30 November 2025	Odisha; 160/6 (20 overs)	v	Vidarbha; 163/2 (14.5 overs)	Vidarbha won by 8 wickets
13:30; Scorecard	Odisha; 160/6 (20 overs)	v	Vidarbha; 163/2 (14.5 overs)	Bharat Ratna Shri Atal Bihari Vajpayee Ekana Cricket Stadium B, Lucknow; Umpires: Bhavesh Patel and Kaushik Gandhi; Player of the match: Aman Mokhade (Vidarbha)
13:30; Scorecard	Sambit Baral 46 (38); Darshan Nalkande 2/48 (4 overs)		Aman Mokhade 73* (40); Rajesh Mohanty 2/32 (3 overs)	Bharat Ratna Shri Atal Bihari Vajpayee Ekana Cricket Stadium B, Lucknow; Umpires: Bhavesh Patel and Kaushik Gandhi; Player of the match: Aman Mokhade (Vidarbha)
Odisha won the toss and elected to bat; Points: Vidarbha 4, Odisha 0				Bharat Ratna Shri Atal Bihari Vajpayee Ekana Cricket Stadium B, Lucknow; Umpires: Bhavesh Patel and Kaushik Gandhi; Player of the match: Aman Mokhade (Vidarbha)

30 November 2025	Andhra; 159/7 (20 overs)	v	Mumbai; 162/1 (15.2 overs)	Mumbai won by 9 wickets
16:30 (D/N); Scorecard	Andhra; 159/7 (20 overs)	v	Mumbai; 162/1 (15.2 overs)	Bharat Ratna Shri Atal Bihari Vajpayee Ekana Cricket Stadium, Lucknow; Umpires: Abhijit Bhattacharya and Akshay Totre; Player of the match: Ayush Mhatre (Mumbai)
16:30 (D/N); Scorecard	Ricky Bhui 48 (40); Tushar Deshpande 3/25 (4 overs)		Ayush Mhatre 104* (59); Prithvi Raj 1/25 (4 overs)	Bharat Ratna Shri Atal Bihari Vajpayee Ekana Cricket Stadium, Lucknow; Umpires: Abhijit Bhattacharya and Akshay Totre; Player of the match: Ayush Mhatre (Mumbai)
Mumbai won the toss and elected to field; Points: Mumbai 4, Andhra 0				Bharat Ratna Shri Atal Bihari Vajpayee Ekana Cricket Stadium, Lucknow; Umpires: Abhijit Bhattacharya and Akshay Totre; Player of the match: Ayush Mhatre (Mumbai)

==== Round 4 ====
02 December 2025	Odisha; 135/8 (20 overs)	v	Chhattisgarh; 108 (19.4 overs)	Odisha won by 27 runs
09:00; Scorecard	Odisha; 135/8 (20 overs)	v	Chhattisgarh; 108 (19.4 overs)	Bharat Ratna Shri Atal Bihari Vajpayee Ekana Cricket Stadium B, Lucknow; Umpires: Abhijit Bhattacharya and Akshay Totre; Player of the match: Rajesh Mohanty (Odisha)
09:00; Scorecard	Biplab Samantray 61 (41); Ajay Mandal 4/25 (4 overs)		Amandeep Khare 46 (32); Rajesh Mohanty 5/21 (4 overs)	Bharat Ratna Shri Atal Bihari Vajpayee Ekana Cricket Stadium B, Lucknow; Umpires: Abhijit Bhattacharya and Akshay Totre; Player of the match: Rajesh Mohanty (Odisha)
Chhattisgarh won the toss and elected to field; Points: Odisha 4, Chhattisgarh 0				Bharat Ratna Shri Atal Bihari Vajpayee Ekana Cricket Stadium B, Lucknow; Umpires: Abhijit Bhattacharya and Akshay Totre; Player of the match: Rajesh Mohanty (Odisha)

02 December 2025	Railways; 167/7 (20 overs)	v	Andhra; 173/5 (19.3 overs)	Andhra won by 5 wickets
11:00; Scorecard	Railways; 167/7 (20 overs)	v	Andhra; 173/5 (19.3 overs)	Bharat Ratna Shri Atal Bihari Vajpayee Ekana Cricket Stadium, Lucknow; Umpires: Bhavesh Patel and Kaushik Gandhi; Player of the match: Ashwin Hebbar (Andhra)
11:00; Scorecard	Upendra Yadav 55 (44); Satyanarayana Raju 3/30 (4 overs)		Ashwin Hebbar 78 (45); Rahul Sharma 2/34 (4)	Bharat Ratna Shri Atal Bihari Vajpayee Ekana Cricket Stadium, Lucknow; Umpires: Bhavesh Patel and Kaushik Gandhi; Player of the match: Ashwin Hebbar (Andhra)
Andhra won the toss and elected to field; Points: Andhra 4, Railways 0				Bharat Ratna Shri Atal Bihari Vajpayee Ekana Cricket Stadium, Lucknow; Umpires: Bhavesh Patel and Kaushik Gandhi; Player of the match: Ashwin Hebbar (Andhra)

02 December 2025	Mumbai; 220/4 (20 overs)	v	Assam; 122 (19.1 overs)	Mumbai won by 98 runs
13:30; Scorecard	Mumbai; 220/4 (20 overs)	v	Assam; 122 (19.1 overs)	Bharat Ratna Shri Atal Bihari Vajpayee Ekana Cricket Stadium B, Lucknow; Umpires: Abhijit Bhattacharya and Akshay Totre; Player of the match: Sarfaraz Khan (Mumbai)
13:30; Scorecard	Sarfaraz Khan 100* (47); Sadek Hussain 1/39 (4 overs)		Sibsankar Roy 41 (33); Shardul Thakur 5/23 (3 overs)	Bharat Ratna Shri Atal Bihari Vajpayee Ekana Cricket Stadium B, Lucknow; Umpires: Abhijit Bhattacharya and Akshay Totre; Player of the match: Sarfaraz Khan (Mumbai)
Assam won the toss and elected to field; Points: Mumbai 4, Assam 0				Bharat Ratna Shri Atal Bihari Vajpayee Ekana Cricket Stadium B, Lucknow; Umpires: Abhijit Bhattacharya and Akshay Totre; Player of the match: Sarfaraz Khan (Mumbai)

02 December 2025	Kerala; 164 (19.2 overs)	v	Vidarbha; 165/4 (18.3 overs)	Vidarbha won by 6 wickets
16:30 (D/N); Scorecard	Kerala; 164 (19.2 overs)	v	Vidarbha; 165/4 (18.3 overs)	Bharat Ratna Shri Atal Bihari Vajpayee Ekana Cricket Stadium, Lucknow; Umpires: Bhavesh Patel and Kaushik Gandhi; Player of the match: Yash Thakur (Vidarbha)
16:30 (D/N); Scorecard	Vishnu Vinod 65 (38); Yash Thakur 5/16 (3.2 overs)		Atharva Taide 54 (36); Sharafuddeen 1/24 (3 overs)	Bharat Ratna Shri Atal Bihari Vajpayee Ekana Cricket Stadium, Lucknow; Umpires: Bhavesh Patel and Kaushik Gandhi; Player of the match: Yash Thakur (Vidarbha)
Vidarbha won the toss and elected to field; Points: Vidarbha 4, Kerala 0				Bharat Ratna Shri Atal Bihari Vajpayee Ekana Cricket Stadium, Lucknow; Umpires: Bhavesh Patel and Kaushik Gandhi; Player of the match: Yash Thakur (Vidarbha)

==== Round 5 ====
04 December 2025	Kerala; 178/5 (20 overs)	v	Mumbai; 163 (19.4 overs)	Kerala won by 15 runs
09:00; Scorecard	Kerala; 178/5 (20 overs)	v	Mumbai; 163 (19.4 overs)	Bharat Ratna Shri Atal Bihari Vajpayee Ekana Cricket Stadium B, Lucknow; Umpires: Abhijit Bhattacharya and Bhavesh Patel; Player of the match: Sharafuddeen (Kerala)
09:00; Scorecard	Sanju Samson 46 (28); Shivam Dube 1/18 (2 overs)		Sarfaraz Khan 52 (40); KM Asif 5/24 (3.4 overs)	Bharat Ratna Shri Atal Bihari Vajpayee Ekana Cricket Stadium B, Lucknow; Umpires: Abhijit Bhattacharya and Bhavesh Patel; Player of the match: Sharafuddeen (Kerala)
Kerala won the toss and elected to bat; Points: Kerala 4, Mumbai 0				Bharat Ratna Shri Atal Bihari Vajpayee Ekana Cricket Stadium B, Lucknow; Umpires: Abhijit Bhattacharya and Bhavesh Patel; Player of the match: Sharafuddeen (Kerala)

04 December 2025	Assam; 175/7 (20 overs)	v	Vidarbha; 117 (17.5 overs)	Assam won by 58 runs
11:00; Scorecard	Assam; 175/7 (20 overs)	v	Vidarbha; 117 (17.5 overs)	Bharat Ratna Shri Atal Bihari Vajpayee Ekana Cricket Stadium, Lucknow; Umpires: Kaushik Gandhi and Akshay Totre; Player of the match: Mukhtar Hussain (Assam)
11:00; Scorecard	Abdul Ajij Kuraishi 57 (43); Yash Thakur 3/36 (4 overs)		Dhruv Shorey 36 (31); Akash Sengupta 3/12 (2.5 overs)	Bharat Ratna Shri Atal Bihari Vajpayee Ekana Cricket Stadium, Lucknow; Umpires: Kaushik Gandhi and Akshay Totre; Player of the match: Mukhtar Hussain (Assam)
Vidarbha won the toss and elected to field; Points: Assam 4, Vidarbha 0				Bharat Ratna Shri Atal Bihari Vajpayee Ekana Cricket Stadium, Lucknow; Umpires: Kaushik Gandhi and Akshay Totre; Player of the match: Mukhtar Hussain (Assam)

04 December 2025	Chhattisgarh; 158/6 (20 overs)	v	Andhra; 159/2 (18.5 overs)	Andhra won by 8 wickets
13:30; Scorecard	Chhattisgarh; 158/6 (20 overs)	v	Andhra; 159/2 (18.5 overs)	Bharat Ratna Shri Atal Bihari Vajpayee Ekana Cricket Stadium B, Lucknow; Umpires: Abhijit Bhattacharya and Bhavesh Patel; Player of the match: Shaik Rasheed (Andhra)
13:30; Scorecard	Shashank Singh 46 (29); Bailapudi Yeswanth 2/24 (4 overs)		Shaik Rasheed 59* (44); Shubham Agarwal 1/24 (4 overs)	Bharat Ratna Shri Atal Bihari Vajpayee Ekana Cricket Stadium B, Lucknow; Umpires: Abhijit Bhattacharya and Bhavesh Patel; Player of the match: Shaik Rasheed (Andhra)
Chhattisgarh won the toss and elected to bat; Points: Andhra 4, Chhattisgarh 0				Bharat Ratna Shri Atal Bihari Vajpayee Ekana Cricket Stadium B, Lucknow; Umpires: Abhijit Bhattacharya and Bhavesh Patel; Player of the match: Shaik Rasheed (Andhra)

04 December 2025	Odisha; 169/5 (20 overs)	v	Railways; 168 (20 overs)	Odisha won by 1 run
16:30 (D/N); Scorecard	Odisha; 169/5 (20 overs)	v	Railways; 168 (20 overs)	Bharat Ratna Shri Atal Bihari Vajpayee Ekana Cricket Stadium, Lucknow; Umpires: Kaushik Gandhi and Akshay Totre; Player of the match: Soumya Lenka (Odisha)
16:30 (D/N); Scorecard	Soumya Lenka 75* (40); Kunal Yadav 2/36 (4 overs)		Akshat Pandey 60 (34); Soumya Lenka 3/50 (4 overs)	Bharat Ratna Shri Atal Bihari Vajpayee Ekana Cricket Stadium, Lucknow; Umpires: Kaushik Gandhi and Akshay Totre; Player of the match: Soumya Lenka (Odisha)
Odisha won the toss and elected to bat; Points: Odisha 4, Railways 0				Bharat Ratna Shri Atal Bihari Vajpayee Ekana Cricket Stadium, Lucknow; Umpires: Kaushik Gandhi and Akshay Totre; Player of the match: Soumya Lenka (Odisha)

==== Round 6 ====
06 December 2025	Odisha; 171/4 (20 overs)	v	Assam; 98 (16 overs)	Odisha won by 73 runs
09:00; Scorecard	Odisha; 171/4 (20 overs)	v	Assam; 98 (16 overs)	Bharat Ratna Shri Atal Bihari Vajpayee Ekana Cricket Stadium B, Lucknow; Umpires: Kaushik Gandhi and Akshay Totre; Player of the match: Aashirwad Swain (Odisha)
09:00; Scorecard	Aashirwad Swain 51* (28); Abdul Ajij Kuraishi 2/27 (3 overs)		Sumit Ghadigaonkar 43 (33); Biplab Samantray 3/2 (1 over)	Bharat Ratna Shri Atal Bihari Vajpayee Ekana Cricket Stadium B, Lucknow; Umpires: Kaushik Gandhi and Akshay Totre; Player of the match: Aashirwad Swain (Odisha)
Assam won the toss and elected to field; Points: Odisha 4, Assam 0				Bharat Ratna Shri Atal Bihari Vajpayee Ekana Cricket Stadium B, Lucknow; Umpires: Kaushik Gandhi and Akshay Totre; Player of the match: Aashirwad Swain (Odisha)

06 December 2025	Chhattisgarh; 121 (19.4 overs)	v	Mumbai; 123/2 (15.5 overs)	Mumbai won by 8 wickets
11:00; Scorecard	Chhattisgarh; 121 (19.4 overs)	v	Mumbai; 123/2 (15.5 overs)	Bharat Ratna Shri Atal Bihari Vajpayee Ekana Cricket Stadium, Lucknow; Umpires: Abhijit Bhattacharya and Bhavesh Patel; Player of the match: Shardul Thakur (Mumbai)
11:00; Scorecard	Aayush Pandey 25 (19); Shardul Thakur 3/19 (3 overs)		Ayush Mhatre 69* (49); Shubham Agarwal 2/24 (4 overs)	Bharat Ratna Shri Atal Bihari Vajpayee Ekana Cricket Stadium, Lucknow; Umpires: Abhijit Bhattacharya and Bhavesh Patel; Player of the match: Shardul Thakur (Mumbai)
Mumbai won the toss and elected to field; Points: Mumbai 4, Chhattisgarh 0				Bharat Ratna Shri Atal Bihari Vajpayee Ekana Cricket Stadium, Lucknow; Umpires: Abhijit Bhattacharya and Bhavesh Patel; Player of the match: Shardul Thakur (Mumbai)

06 December 2025	Kerala; 119/7 (20 overs)	v	Andhra; 123/3 (12 overs)	Andhra won by 7 wickets
13:30; Scorecard	Kerala; 119/7 (20 overs)	v	Andhra; 123/3 (12 overs)	Bharat Ratna Shri Atal Bihari Vajpayee Ekana Cricket Stadium B, Lucknow; Umpires: Kaushik Gandhi and Akshay Totre; Player of the match: Srikar Bharat (Andhra)
13:30; Scorecard	Sanju Samson 73* (56); Saurabh Kumar 2/18 (4 overs)		Srikar Bharat 53 (28); Abdul Basith 1/13 (1 over)	Bharat Ratna Shri Atal Bihari Vajpayee Ekana Cricket Stadium B, Lucknow; Umpires: Kaushik Gandhi and Akshay Totre; Player of the match: Srikar Bharat (Andhra)
Andhra won the toss and elected to field; Points: Andhra 4, Kerala 0				Bharat Ratna Shri Atal Bihari Vajpayee Ekana Cricket Stadium B, Lucknow; Umpires: Kaushik Gandhi and Akshay Totre; Player of the match: Srikar Bharat (Andhra)

06 December 2025	Vidarbha; 172/5 (20 overs)	v	Railways; 176/5 (19.1 overs)	Railways won by 5 wickets
16:30 (D/N); Scorecard	Vidarbha; 172/5 (20 overs)	v	Railways; 176/5 (19.1 overs)	Bharat Ratna Shri Atal Bihari Vajpayee Ekana Cricket Stadium, Lucknow; Umpires: Abhijit Bhattacharya and Bhavesh Patel; Player of the match: Ravi Singh (Railways)
16:30 (D/N); Scorecard	Dhruv Shorey 68* (42); Karn Sharma 2/17 (4 overs)		Ravi Singh 68* (38); Harsh Dubey 2/28 (4 overs)	Bharat Ratna Shri Atal Bihari Vajpayee Ekana Cricket Stadium, Lucknow; Umpires: Abhijit Bhattacharya and Bhavesh Patel; Player of the match: Ravi Singh (Railways)
Railways won the toss and elected to field; Points: Railways 4, Vidarbha 0				Bharat Ratna Shri Atal Bihari Vajpayee Ekana Cricket Stadium, Lucknow; Umpires: Abhijit Bhattacharya and Bhavesh Patel; Player of the match: Ravi Singh (Railways)

==== Round 7 ====
08 December 2025	Vidarbha; 154/8 (20 overs)	v	Andhra; 135/9 (20 overs)	Vidarbha won by 19 runs
09:00; Scorecard	Vidarbha; 154/8 (20 overs)	v	Andhra; 135/9 (20 overs)	Bharat Ratna Shri Atal Bihari Vajpayee Ekana Cricket Stadium B, Lucknow; Umpires: Akshay Totre and Bhavesh Patel; Player of the match: Aman Mokhade (Vidarbha)
09:00; Scorecard	Aman Mokhade 50 (35); Satyanarayana Raju 4/26 (4 overs)		Pyla Avinash 44 (37); Yash Thakur 4/22 (4 overs)	Bharat Ratna Shri Atal Bihari Vajpayee Ekana Cricket Stadium B, Lucknow; Umpires: Akshay Totre and Bhavesh Patel; Player of the match: Aman Mokhade (Vidarbha)
Andhra won the toss and elected to field; Points: Vidarbha 4, Andhra 0				Bharat Ratna Shri Atal Bihari Vajpayee Ekana Cricket Stadium B, Lucknow; Umpires: Akshay Totre and Bhavesh Patel; Player of the match: Aman Mokhade (Vidarbha)

06 December 2025	Kerala; 101 (19.4 overs)	v	Assam; 105/5 (18.5 overs)	Assam won by 5 wickets
11:00; Scorecard	Kerala; 101 (19.4 overs)	v	Assam; 105/5 (18.5 overs)	Bharat Ratna Shri Atal Bihari Vajpayee Ekana Cricket Stadium, Lucknow; Umpires: Abhijit Bhattacharya and Kaushik Gandhi; Player of the match: Avinov Choudhury (Assam)
11:00; Scorecard	Rohan Kunnummal 23 (33); Sadek Hussain 4/19 (3.4)		Pradyun Saikia 41* (39); KM Asif 2/22 (3.5 overs)	Bharat Ratna Shri Atal Bihari Vajpayee Ekana Cricket Stadium, Lucknow; Umpires: Abhijit Bhattacharya and Kaushik Gandhi; Player of the match: Avinov Choudhury (Assam)
Assam won the toss and elected to field; Points: Assam 4, Kerala 0				Bharat Ratna Shri Atal Bihari Vajpayee Ekana Cricket Stadium, Lucknow; Umpires: Abhijit Bhattacharya and Kaushik Gandhi; Player of the match: Avinov Choudhury (Assam)

06 December 2025	Railways; 170 (20 overs)	v	Chhattisgarh; 171/5 (19.1 overs)	Chhattisgarh won by 5 wickets
13:30; Scorecard	Railways; 170 (20 overs)	v	Chhattisgarh; 171/5 (19.1 overs)	Bharat Ratna Shri Atal Bihari Vajpayee Ekana Cricket Stadium B, Lucknow; Umpires: Akshay Totre and Bhavesh Patel; Player of the match: Amandeep Khare (Chhattisgarh)
13:30; Scorecard	Suraj Ahuja 47 (30); Ravi Kiran 2/33 (4 overs)		Amandeep Khare 78* (47); Kunal Yadav 2/30 (3.1 overs)	Bharat Ratna Shri Atal Bihari Vajpayee Ekana Cricket Stadium B, Lucknow; Umpires: Akshay Totre and Bhavesh Patel; Player of the match: Amandeep Khare (Chhattisgarh)
Chhattisgarh won the toss and elected to field; Points: Chhattisgarh 4, Railways 0				Bharat Ratna Shri Atal Bihari Vajpayee Ekana Cricket Stadium B, Lucknow; Umpires: Akshay Totre and Bhavesh Patel; Player of the match: Amandeep Khare (Chhattisgarh)

06 December 2025	Odisha; 167/7 (20 overs)	v	Mumbai; 168/1 (16 overs)	Mumbai won by 9 wickets
16:30 (D/N); Scorecard	Odisha; 167/7 (20 overs)	v	Mumbai; 168/1 (16 overs)	Bharat Ratna Shri Atal Bihari Vajpayee Ekana Cricket Stadium, Lucknow; Umpires: Abhijit Bhattacharya and Kaushik Gandhi; Player of the match: Ajinkya Rahane (Mumbai)
16:30 (D/N); Scorecard	Sandeep Pattnaik 31 (26); Suryansh Shedge 3/46 (4 overs)		Ajinkya Rahane 95* (56); Badal Biswal 1/31 (4 overs)	Bharat Ratna Shri Atal Bihari Vajpayee Ekana Cricket Stadium, Lucknow; Umpires: Abhijit Bhattacharya and Kaushik Gandhi; Player of the match: Ajinkya Rahane (Mumbai)
Mumbai won the toss and elected to field; Points: Mumbai 4, Odisha 0				Bharat Ratna Shri Atal Bihari Vajpayee Ekana Cricket Stadium, Lucknow; Umpires: Abhijit Bhattacharya and Kaushik Gandhi; Player of the match: Ajinkya Rahane (Mumbai)

=== Group B ===
==== Round 1 ====
26 November 2025	Goa; 172/9 (20 overs)	v	Uttar Pradesh; 173/4 (18.2 overs)	Uttar Pradesh won by 6 wickets
08:30; Scorecard	Goa; 172/9 (20 overs)	v	Uttar Pradesh; 173/4 (18.2 overs)	JU Second Campus, Salt Lake, Kolkata; Umpires: Tony Ematty and Ulhas Gandhe; Player of the match: Aryan Juyal (Uttar Pradesh)
08:30; Scorecard	Abhinav Tejrana 72 (35); Shivam Mavi 3/24 (4 overs)		Aryan Juyal 93* (57); Deepraj Gaonkar 2/19 (4 overs)	JU Second Campus, Salt Lake, Kolkata; Umpires: Tony Ematty and Ulhas Gandhe; Player of the match: Aryan Juyal (Uttar Pradesh)
Uttar Pradesh won the toss and elected to field; Points: Uttar Pradesh 4, Goa 0				JU Second Campus, Salt Lake, Kolkata; Umpires: Tony Ematty and Ulhas Gandhe; Player of the match: Aryan Juyal (Uttar Pradesh)

26 November 2025	Maharashtra; 130 (19.5 overs)	v	Jammu & Kashmir; 132/5 (18.4 overs)	Jammu & Kashmir won by 5 wickets
11:00; Scorecard	Maharashtra; 130 (19.5 overs)	v	Jammu & Kashmir; 132/5 (18.4 overs)	Eden Gardens, Kolkata; Umpires: Amit Rana and Keyur Kelkar; Player of the match: Abid Mushtaq (Jammu & Kashmir)
11:00; Scorecard	Vicky Ostwal 21 (25); Auqib Nabi 3/28 (3.5 overs)		Qamran Iqbal 28 (27); Prashant Solanki 2/29 (4 overs)	Eden Gardens, Kolkata; Umpires: Amit Rana and Keyur Kelkar; Player of the match: Abid Mushtaq (Jammu & Kashmir)
Jammu & Kashmir won the toss and elected to field; Points: Jammu & Kashmir 4, Maharashtra 0				Eden Gardens, Kolkata; Umpires: Amit Rana and Keyur Kelkar; Player of the match: Abid Mushtaq (Jammu & Kashmir)

26 November 2025	Madhya Pradesh; 144/9 (20 overs)	v	Hyderabad; 145/5 (18.1 overs)	Hyderabad won by 5 wickets
12:40; Scorecard	Madhya Pradesh; 144/9 (20 overs)	v	Hyderabad; 145/5 (18.1 overs)	JU Second Campus, Salt Lake, Kolkata; Umpires: Tony Ematty and Ulhas Gandhe; Player of the match: Rahul Buddhi (Hyderabad)
12:40; Scorecard	Shivang Kumar 45 (28); Chama Milind 3/34 (4 overs)		Rahul Buddhi 59* (46); Tripuresh Singh 2/25 (4 overs)	JU Second Campus, Salt Lake, Kolkata; Umpires: Tony Ematty and Ulhas Gandhe; Player of the match: Rahul Buddhi (Hyderabad)
Madhya Pradesh won the toss and elected to bat; Points: Hyderabad 4, Madhya Pradesh 0				JU Second Campus, Salt Lake, Kolkata; Umpires: Tony Ematty and Ulhas Gandhe; Player of the match: Rahul Buddhi (Hyderabad)

26 November 2025	Bihar; 157/7 (20 overs)	v	Chandigarh; 160/4 (18.4 overs)	Chandigarh won by 6 wickets
16:30 (D/N); Scorecard	Bihar; 157/7 (20 overs)	v	Chandigarh; 160/4 (18.4 overs)	Eden Gardens, Kolkata; Umpires: Amit Rana and Keyur Kelkar; Player of the match: Raj Bawa (Chandigarh)
16:30 (D/N); Scorecard	Sakibul Gani 36 (26); Raj Bawa 2/25 (4 overs)		Manan Vohra 50 (40); Suraj Kashyap 2/23 (4 overs)	Eden Gardens, Kolkata; Umpires: Amit Rana and Keyur Kelkar; Player of the match: Raj Bawa (Chandigarh)
Chandigarh won the toss and elected to field; Points: Chandigarh 4, Bihar 0				Eden Gardens, Kolkata; Umpires: Amit Rana and Keyur Kelkar; Player of the match: Raj Bawa (Chandigarh)

==== Round 2 ====
28 November 2025	Hyderabad; 191/8 (20 overs)	v	Maharashtra; 192/2 (18.4 overs)	Maharashtra won by 8 wickets
08:30; Scorecard	Hyderabad; 191/8 (20 overs)	v	Maharashtra; 192/2 (18.4 overs)	JU Second Campus, Salt Lake, Kolkata; Umpires: Amit Rana and Keyur Kelkar; Player of the match: Arshin Kulkarni (Maharashtra)
08:30; Scorecard	Chama Milind 35* (20); Jalaj Saxena 2/25 (4 overs)		Arshin Kulkarni 89* (54); Ajay Dev Goud 1/34 (3 overs)	JU Second Campus, Salt Lake, Kolkata; Umpires: Amit Rana and Keyur Kelkar; Player of the match: Arshin Kulkarni (Maharashtra)
Maharashtra won the toss and elected to field; Points: Maharashtra 4, Hyderabad 0				JU Second Campus, Salt Lake, Kolkata; Umpires: Amit Rana and Keyur Kelkar; Player of the match: Arshin Kulkarni (Maharashtra)

28 November 2025	Madhya Pradesh; 174/8 (20 overs)	v	Bihar; 112 (19.2 overs)	Madhya Pradesh won by 62 runs
11:00; Scorecard	Madhya Pradesh; 174/8 (20 overs)	v	Bihar; 112 (19.2 overs)	Eden Gardens, Kolkata; Umpires: Tony Ematty and Ulhas Gandhe; Player of the match: Venkatesh Iyer (Madhya Pradesh)
11:00; Scorecard	Venkatesh Iyer 55* (34); Mohd Izhar 4/39 (4 overs)		Bipin Saurabh 32 (24); Shivang Kumar 3/25 (4 overs)	Eden Gardens, Kolkata; Umpires: Tony Ematty and Ulhas Gandhe; Player of the match: Venkatesh Iyer (Madhya Pradesh)
Bihar won the toss and elected to field; Points: Madhya Pradesh 4, Bihar 0				Eden Gardens, Kolkata; Umpires: Tony Ematty and Ulhas Gandhe; Player of the match: Venkatesh Iyer (Madhya Pradesh)

28 November 2025	Uttar Pradesh; 193/6 (20 overs)	v	Jammu & Kashmir; 84 (15.3 overs)	Uttar Pradesh won by 109 runs
12:40; Scorecard	Uttar Pradesh; 193/6 (20 overs)	v	Jammu & Kashmir; 84 (15.3 overs)	JU Second Campus, Salt Lake, Kolkata; Umpires: Amit Rana and Keyur Kelkar; Player of the match: Prashant Veer (Uttar Pradesh)
12:40; Scorecard	Aryan Juyal 51 (40); Umran Malik 3/37 (4 overs)		Qamran Iqbal 20 (24); Prashant Veer 3/20 (4 overs)	JU Second Campus, Salt Lake, Kolkata; Umpires: Amit Rana and Keyur Kelkar; Player of the match: Prashant Veer (Uttar Pradesh)
Jammu & Kashmir won the toss and elected to field; Points: Uttar Pradesh 4, Jammu & Kashmir 0				JU Second Campus, Salt Lake, Kolkata; Umpires: Amit Rana and Keyur Kelkar; Player of the match: Prashant Veer (Uttar Pradesh)

28 November 2025	Goa; 173/6 (20 overs)	v	Chandigarh; 121 (19 overs)	Goa won by 52 runs
16:30 (D/N); Scorecard	Goa; 173/6 (20 overs)	v	Chandigarh; 121 (19 overs)	Eden Gardens, Kolkata; Umpires: Tony Ematty and Ulhas Gandhe; Player of the match: Lalit Yadav (Goa)
16:30 (D/N); Scorecard	Lalit Yadav 82* (49); Jagjit Singh 2/33 (4 overs)		Raj Bawa 29 (23); Vasuki Koushik 3/12 (4 overs)	Eden Gardens, Kolkata; Umpires: Tony Ematty and Ulhas Gandhe; Player of the match: Lalit Yadav (Goa)
Chandigarh won the toss and elected to field; Points: Goa 4, Chandigarh 0				Eden Gardens, Kolkata; Umpires: Tony Ematty and Ulhas Gandhe; Player of the match: Lalit Yadav (Goa)

==== Round 3 ====
30 November 2025	Maharashtra; 139/7 (20 overs)	v	Chandigarh; 142/5 (19.4 overs)	Chandigarh won by 5 wickets
09:00; Scorecard	Maharashtra; 139/7 (20 overs)	v	Chandigarh; 142/5 (19.4 overs)	JU Second Campus, Salt Lake, Kolkata; Umpires: Amit Rana and Ulhas Gandhe; Player of the match: Manan Vohra (Chandigarh)
09:00; Scorecard	Arshin Kulkarni 47 (41); Sandeep Sharma 2/18 (4 overs)		Manan Vohra 72* (48); Prashant Solanki 1/22 (4 overs)	JU Second Campus, Salt Lake, Kolkata; Umpires: Amit Rana and Ulhas Gandhe; Player of the match: Manan Vohra (Chandigarh)
Chandigarh won the toss and elected to field; Points: Chandigarh 4, Maharashtra 0				JU Second Campus, Salt Lake, Kolkata; Umpires: Amit Rana and Ulhas Gandhe; Player of the match: Manan Vohra (Chandigarh)

30 November 2025	Goa; 160/4 (20 overs)	v	Hyderabad; 166/3 (14 overs)	Hyderabad won by 7 wickets
11:00; Scorecard	Goa; 160/4 (20 overs)	v	Hyderabad; 166/3 (14 overs)	Eden Gardens, Kolkata; Umpires: Keyur Kelkar and Tony Ematty; Player of the match: Pragnay Reddy (Hyderabad)
11:00; Scorecard	Lalit Yadav 85* (48); Tanay Thyagarajan 2/20 (4 overs)		Pragnay Reddy 67* (34); Vikas Singh 1/22 (3 overs)	Eden Gardens, Kolkata; Umpires: Keyur Kelkar and Tony Ematty; Player of the match: Pragnay Reddy (Hyderabad)
Hyderabad won the toss and elected to field; Points: Hyderabad 4, Goa 0				Eden Gardens, Kolkata; Umpires: Keyur Kelkar and Tony Ematty; Player of the match: Pragnay Reddy (Hyderabad)

30 November 2025	Madhya Pradesh; 184/7 (20 overs)	v	Uttar Pradesh; 147 (18.4 overs)	Madhya Pradesh won by 37 runs
13:30; Scorecard	Madhya Pradesh; 184/7 (20 overs)	v	Uttar Pradesh; 147 (18.4 overs)	JU Second Campus, Salt Lake, Kolkata; Umpires: Amit Rana and Ulhas Gandhe; Player of the match: Rajat Patidar (Madhya Pradesh)
13:30; Scorecard	Harsh Gawli 49 (42); Vipraj Nigam 2/36 (4)		Rinku Singh 65 (42); Rahul Batham 3/33 (3.4 overs)	JU Second Campus, Salt Lake, Kolkata; Umpires: Amit Rana and Ulhas Gandhe; Player of the match: Rajat Patidar (Madhya Pradesh)
Uttar Pradesh won the toss and elected to field; Points: Madhya Pradesh 4, Uttar Pradesh 0				JU Second Campus, Salt Lake, Kolkata; Umpires: Amit Rana and Ulhas Gandhe; Player of the match: Rajat Patidar (Madhya Pradesh)

30 November 2025	Jammu & Kashmir; 159/9 (20 overs)	v	Bihar; 125/9 (20 overs)	Jammu & Kashmir won by 34 runs
16:30 (D/N); Scorecard	Jammu & Kashmir; 159/9 (20 overs)	v	Bihar; 125/9 (20 overs)	Eden Gardens, Kolkata; Umpires: Keyur Kelkar and Tony Ematty; Player of the match: Auqib Nabi (Jammu & Kashmir)
16:30 (D/N); Scorecard	Qamran Iqbal 64 (40); Mohd Izhar 2/21 (4 overs)		Akash Raj 28 (32); Auqib Nabi 4/16 (4 overs)	Eden Gardens, Kolkata; Umpires: Keyur Kelkar and Tony Ematty; Player of the match: Auqib Nabi (Jammu & Kashmir)
Jammu & Kashmir won the toss and elected to bat; Points: Jammu & Kashmir 4, Bihar 0				Eden Gardens, Kolkata; Umpires: Keyur Kelkar and Tony Ematty; Player of the match: Auqib Nabi (Jammu & Kashmir)

==== Round 4 ====
02 December 2025	Madhya Pradesh; 170/6 (20 overs)	v	Goa; 171/3 (18.3 overs)	Goa won by 7 wickets
08:30; Scorecard	Madhya Pradesh; 170/6 (20 overs)	v	Goa; 171/3 (18.3 overs)	JU Second Campus, Salt Lake, Kolkata; Umpires: Keyur Kelkar and Tony Ematty; Player of the match: Suyash Prabhudessai (Goa)
08:30; Scorecard	Harpreet Singh 80* (52); Arjun Tendulkar 3/36 (4 overs)		Suyash Prabhudessai 75* (50); Tripuresh Singh 1/27 (3 overs)	JU Second Campus, Salt Lake, Kolkata; Umpires: Keyur Kelkar and Tony Ematty; Player of the match: Suyash Prabhudessai (Goa)
Goa won the toss and elected to field; Points: Goa 4, Madhya Pradesh 0				JU Second Campus, Salt Lake, Kolkata; Umpires: Keyur Kelkar and Tony Ematty; Player of the match: Suyash Prabhudessai (Goa)

02 December 2025	Bihar; 176/3 (20 overs)	v	Maharashtra; 182/7 (19.1 overs)	Maharashtra won by 3 wickets
11:00; Scorecard	Bihar; 176/3 (20 overs)	v	Maharashtra; 182/7 (19.1 overs)	Eden Gardens, Kolkata; Umpires: Amit Rana and Ulhas Gandhe; Player of the match: Prithvi Shaw (Maharashtra)
11:00; Scorecard	Vaibhav Suryavanshi 108* (61); Vicky Ostwal 1/26 (4 overs)		Prithvi Shaw 66 (30); Mohd Izhar 2/22 (4 overs)	Eden Gardens, Kolkata; Umpires: Amit Rana and Ulhas Gandhe; Player of the match: Prithvi Shaw (Maharashtra)
Maharashtra won the toss and elected to field; Points: Maharashtra 4, Bihar 0				Eden Gardens, Kolkata; Umpires: Amit Rana and Ulhas Gandhe; Player of the match: Prithvi Shaw (Maharashtra)

02 December 2025	Jammu & Kashmir; 192 (20 overs)	v	Chandigarh; 163/7 (20 overs)	Jammu & Kashmir won by 29 runs
12:40; Scorecard	Jammu & Kashmir; 192 (20 overs)	v	Chandigarh; 163/7 (20 overs)	JU Second Campus, Salt Lake, Kolkata; Umpires: Keyur Kelkar and Tony Ematty; Player of the match: Yawer Hassan (Jammu & Kashmir)
12:40; Scorecard	Yawer Hassan 57 (36); Nikhil Sharma 2/36 (3 overs)		Gaurav Puri 39 (23); Yudhvir Singh 2/32 (4 overs)	JU Second Campus, Salt Lake, Kolkata; Umpires: Keyur Kelkar and Tony Ematty; Player of the match: Yawer Hassan (Jammu & Kashmir)
Chandigarh won the toss and elected to field; Points: Jammu & Kashmir 4, Chandigarh 0				JU Second Campus, Salt Lake, Kolkata; Umpires: Keyur Kelkar and Tony Ematty; Player of the match: Yawer Hassan (Jammu & Kashmir)

02 December 2025	Uttar Pradesh; 127 (19.2 overs)	v	Hyderabad; 129/7 (17.1 overs)	Hyderabad won by 3 wickets
16:30 (D/N); Scorecard	Uttar Pradesh; 127 (19.2 overs)	v	Hyderabad; 129/7 (17.1 overs)	Eden Gardens, Kolkata; Umpires: Amit Rana and Ulhas Gandhe; Player of the match: Tanay Thyagarajan (Hyderabad)
16:30 (D/N); Scorecard	Madhav Kaushik 37 (31); Tanay Thyagarajan 3/29 (4 overs)		Tanmay Agarwal 43 (26); Vipraj Nigam 3/20 (4 overs)	Eden Gardens, Kolkata; Umpires: Amit Rana and Ulhas Gandhe; Player of the match: Tanay Thyagarajan (Hyderabad)
Hyderabad won the toss and elected to field; Points: Hyderabad 4, Uttar Pradesh 0				Eden Gardens, Kolkata; Umpires: Amit Rana and Ulhas Gandhe; Player of the match: Tanay Thyagarajan (Hyderabad)

==== Round 5 ====
04 December 2025	Jammu & Kashmir; 112 (19.3 overs)	v	Hyderabad; 115/6 (15.1 overs)	Hyderabad won by 4 wickets
08:30; Scorecard	Jammu & Kashmir; 112 (19.3 overs)	v	Hyderabad; 115/6 (15.1 overs)	JU Second Campus, Salt Lake, Kolkata; Umpires: Tony Emmatty and Amit Rana; Player of the match: Nitin Sai Yadav (Hyderabad)
08:30; Scorecard	Shubham Khajuria 35 (33); Nitin Sai Yadav 3/17 (4 overs)		Tanay Thyagarajan 50 (33); Murugan Ashwin 2/16 (3 overs)	JU Second Campus, Salt Lake, Kolkata; Umpires: Tony Emmatty and Amit Rana; Player of the match: Nitin Sai Yadav (Hyderabad)
Hyderabad won the toss and elected to field; Points: Hyderabad 4, Jammu & Kashmir 0				JU Second Campus, Salt Lake, Kolkata; Umpires: Tony Emmatty and Amit Rana; Player of the match: Nitin Sai Yadav (Hyderabad)

04 December 2025	Uttar Pradesh; 212/7 (20 overs)	v	Chandigarh; 172/8 (20 overs)	Uttar Pradesh won by 40 runs
11:00; Scorecard	Uttar Pradesh; 212/7 (20 overs)	v	Chandigarh; 172/8 (20 overs)	Eden Gardens, Kolkata; Umpires: Ulhas Gandhe and Keyur Kelkar; Player of the match: Sameer Rizvi (Uttar Pradesh)
11:00; Scorecard	Sameer Rizvi 70 (42); Sandeep Sharma 4/26 (4 overs)		Manan Vohra 61 (35); Bhuvneshwar Kumar 3/23 (4 overs)	Eden Gardens, Kolkata; Umpires: Ulhas Gandhe and Keyur Kelkar; Player of the match: Sameer Rizvi (Uttar Pradesh)
Chandigarh won the toss and elected to field; Points: Uttar Pradesh 4, Chandigarh 0				Eden Gardens, Kolkata; Umpires: Ulhas Gandhe and Keyur Kelkar; Player of the match: Sameer Rizvi (Uttar Pradesh)

04 December 2025	Bihar; 180/7 (20 overs)	v	Goa; 184/5 (19.5 overs)	Goa won by 5 wickets
12:40; Scorecard	Bihar; 180/7 (20 overs)	v	Goa; 184/5 (19.5 overs)	JU Second Campus, Salt Lake, Kolkata; Umpires: Tony Emmatty and Amit Rana; Player of the match: Suyash Prabhudessai (Goa)
12:40; Scorecard	Sakibul Gani 60 (41); Deepraj Gaonkar 4/38 (4 overs)		Suyash Prabhudessai 79 (46); Suraj Kashyap 3/24 (4 overs)	JU Second Campus, Salt Lake, Kolkata; Umpires: Tony Emmatty and Amit Rana; Player of the match: Suyash Prabhudessai (Goa)
Goa won the toss and elected to field; Points: Goa 4, Bihar 0				JU Second Campus, Salt Lake, Kolkata; Umpires: Tony Emmatty and Amit Rana; Player of the match: Suyash Prabhudessai (Goa)

04 December 2025	Madhya Pradesh; 153/8 (20 overs)	v	Maharashtra; 132/8 (20 overs)	Madhya Pradesh won by 21 runs
16:30 (D/N); Scorecard	Madhya Pradesh; 153/8 (20 overs)	v	Maharashtra; 132/8 (20 overs)	Eden Gardens, Kolkata; Umpires: Ulhas Gandhe and Keyur Kelkar; Player of the match: Arshad Khan (Madhya Pradesh)
16:30 (D/N); Scorecard	Arshad Khan 30 (17); Rajvardhan Hangargekar 2/30 (4 overs)		Rahul Tripathi 37 (38); Tripuresh Singh 3/23 (4 overs)	Eden Gardens, Kolkata; Umpires: Ulhas Gandhe and Keyur Kelkar; Player of the match: Arshad Khan (Madhya Pradesh)
Maharashtra won the toss and elected to field; Points: Madhya Pradesh 4, Maharashtra 0				Eden Gardens, Kolkata; Umpires: Ulhas Gandhe and Keyur Kelkar; Player of the match: Arshad Khan (Madhya Pradesh)

==== Round 6 ====
06 December 2025	Chandigarh; 134/8 (20 overs)	v	Madhya Pradesh; 135/3 (14 overs)	Madhya Pradesh won by 7 wickets
08:30; Scorecard	Chandigarh; 134/8 (20 overs)	v	Madhya Pradesh; 135/3 (14 overs)	JU Second Campus, Salt Lake, Kolkata; Umpires: Ulhas Gandhe and Keyur Kelkar; Player of the match: Arshad Khan (Madhya Pradesh)
08:30; Scorecard	Manan Vohra 52 (43); Arshad Khan 6/9 (4 overs)		Harsh Gawli 74* (40); Jagjit Singh 2/33 (3 overs)	JU Second Campus, Salt Lake, Kolkata; Umpires: Ulhas Gandhe and Keyur Kelkar; Player of the match: Arshad Khan (Madhya Pradesh)
Madhya Pradesh won the toss and elected to field; Points: Madhya Pradesh 4, Chandigarh 0				JU Second Campus, Salt Lake, Kolkata; Umpires: Ulhas Gandhe and Keyur Kelkar; Player of the match: Arshad Khan (Madhya Pradesh)

06 December 2025	Jammu & Kashmir; 161/5 (20 overs)	v	Goa; 167/3 (19 overs)	Goa won by 7 wickets
11:00; Scorecard	Jammu & Kashmir; 161/5 (20 overs)	v	Goa; 167/3 (19 overs)	Eden Gardens, Kolkata; Umpires: Tony Emmatty and Amit Rana; Player of the match: Suyash Prabhudessai (Goa)
11:00; Scorecard	Yawer Hassan 48 (39); Shubham Tari 3/30 (4 overs)		Kashyap Bakhale 59 (44); Auqib Nabi 1/31 (4 overs)	Eden Gardens, Kolkata; Umpires: Tony Emmatty and Amit Rana; Player of the match: Suyash Prabhudessai (Goa)
Goa won the toss and elected to field; Points: Goa 4, Jammu & Kashmir 0				Eden Gardens, Kolkata; Umpires: Tony Emmatty and Amit Rana; Player of the match: Suyash Prabhudessai (Goa)

06 December 2025	Bihar; 132/8 (20 overs)	v	Hyderabad; 134/3 (12.5 overs)	Hyderabad won by 7 wickets
12:40; Scorecard	Bihar; 132/8 (20 overs)	v	Hyderabad; 134/3 (12.5 overs)	JU Second Campus, Salt Lake, Kolkata; Umpires: Ulhas Gandhe and Keyur Kelkar; Player of the match: Tanmay Agarwal (Hyderabad)
12:40; Scorecard	Piyush Singh 34 (30); Tanay Thyagarajan 3/21 (4 overs)		Tanmay Agarwal 67* (42); Amod Yadav 1/22 (2 overs)	JU Second Campus, Salt Lake, Kolkata; Umpires: Ulhas Gandhe and Keyur Kelkar; Player of the match: Tanmay Agarwal (Hyderabad)
Bihar won the toss and elected to bat; Points: Hyderabad 4, Bihar 0				JU Second Campus, Salt Lake, Kolkata; Umpires: Ulhas Gandhe and Keyur Kelkar; Player of the match: Tanmay Agarwal (Hyderabad)

06 December 2025	Uttar Pradesh; 130/9 (20 overs)	v	Maharashtra; 131/7 (19 overs)	Maharashtra won by 3 wickets
16:30 (D/N); Scorecard	Uttar Pradesh; 130/9 (20 overs)	v	Maharashtra; 131/7 (19 overs)	Eden Gardens, Kolkata; Umpires: Tony Emmatty and Amit Rana; Player of the match: Rajvardhan Hangargekar (Maharashtra)
16:30 (D/N); Scorecard	Rinku Singh 45 (29); Rajvardhan Hangargekar 3/10 (3 overs)		Prithvi Shaw 28 (28); Kartik Tyagi 3/34 (4 overs)	Eden Gardens, Kolkata; Umpires: Tony Emmatty and Amit Rana; Player of the match: Rajvardhan Hangargekar (Maharashtra)
Uttar Pradesh won the toss and elected to bat; Points: Maharashtra 4, Uttar Pradesh 0				Eden Gardens, Kolkata; Umpires: Tony Emmatty and Amit Rana; Player of the match: Rajvardhan Hangargekar (Maharashtra)

==== Round 7 ====
06 December 2025	Uttar Pradesh; 144/6 (20 overs)	v	Bihar; 145/4 (19.2 overs)	Bihar won by 6 wickets
08:30; Scorecard	Uttar Pradesh; 144/6 (20 overs)	v	Bihar; 145/4 (19.2 overs)	JU Second Campus, Salt Lake, Kolkata; Umpires: Amit Rana and Keyur Kelkar; Player of the match: Piyush Singh (Bihar)
08:30; Scorecard	Prashant Veer 40* (26); Mangal Mahrour 3/12 (4)		Piyush Singh 57 (54); Prince Yadav 3/24 (4)	JU Second Campus, Salt Lake, Kolkata; Umpires: Amit Rana and Keyur Kelkar; Player of the match: Piyush Singh (Bihar)
Bihar won the toss and elected to field; Points: Bihar 4, Uttar Pradesh 0				JU Second Campus, Salt Lake, Kolkata; Umpires: Amit Rana and Keyur Kelkar; Player of the match: Piyush Singh (Bihar)

08 December 2025	Hyderabad; 146/8 (20 overs)	v	Chandigarh; 147/6 (19.5 overs)	Chandigarh won by 4 wickets
11:00; Scorecard	Hyderabad; 146/8 (20 overs)	v	Chandigarh; 147/6 (19.5 overs)	Eden Gardens, Kolkata; Umpires: Tony Ematty and Ulhas Gandhe; Player of the match: Jagjit Singh (Chandigarh)
11:00; Scorecard	Pragnay Reddy 43 (31); Jagjit Singh 3/36 (4 overs)		Arjun Azad 63 (48); Chama Milind 2/27 (4 overs)	Eden Gardens, Kolkata; Umpires: Tony Ematty and Ulhas Gandhe; Player of the match: Jagjit Singh (Chandigarh)
Hyderabad won the toss and elected to bat; Points: Chandigarh 4, Hyderabad 0				Eden Gardens, Kolkata; Umpires: Tony Ematty and Ulhas Gandhe; Player of the match: Jagjit Singh (Chandigarh)

08 December 2025	Maharashtra; 161/7 (20 overs)	v	Goa; 146 (19.3 overs)	Maharashtra won by 15 runs
12:40; Scorecard	Maharashtra; 161/7 (20 overs)	v	Goa; 146 (19.3 overs)	JU Second Campus, Salt Lake, Kolkata; Umpires: Amit Rana and Keyur Kelkar; Player of the match: Rahul Tripathi (Maharashtra)
12:40; Scorecard	Rahul Tripathi 83* (44); Vasuki Koushik 3/20 (4 overs)		Lalit Yadav 49 (38); Jalaj Saxena 3/22 (4 overs)	JU Second Campus, Salt Lake, Kolkata; Umpires: Amit Rana and Keyur Kelkar; Player of the match: Rahul Tripathi (Maharashtra)
Goa won the toss and elected to field; Points: Maharashtra 4, Goa 0				JU Second Campus, Salt Lake, Kolkata; Umpires: Amit Rana and Keyur Kelkar; Player of the match: Rahul Tripathi (Maharashtra)

08 December 2025	Jammu & Kashmir; 150/9 (20 overs)	v	Madhya Pradesh; 137 (20 overs)	Jammu & Kashmir won by 13 runs
16:30 (D/N); Scorecard	Jammu & Kashmir; 150/9 (20 overs)	v	Madhya Pradesh; 137 (20 overs)	Eden Gardens, Kolkata; Umpires: Tony Ematty and Ulhas Gandhe; Player of the match: Auqib Nabi (Jammu & Kashmir)
16:30 (D/N); Scorecard	Auqib Nabi 32 (21); Tripuresh Singh 3/32 (4 overs)		Harsh Gawli 33 (32); Auqib Nabi 3/19 (4 overs)	Eden Gardens, Kolkata; Umpires: Tony Ematty and Ulhas Gandhe; Player of the match: Auqib Nabi (Jammu & Kashmir)
Madhya Pradesh won the toss and elected to field; Points: Jammu & Kashmir 4, Madhya Pradesh 0				Eden Gardens, Kolkata; Umpires: Tony Ematty and Ulhas Gandhe; Player of the match: Auqib Nabi (Jammu & Kashmir)

=== Group C ===
==== Round 1 ====
26 November 2025	Services; 182/9 (20 overs)	v	Gujarat; 183/2 (12.3 overs)	Gujarat won by 8 wickets
09:00; Scorecard	Services; 182/9 (20 overs)	v	Gujarat; 183/2 (12.3 overs)	Gymkhana Ground, Hyderabad; Umpires: Anish Sahasrabudhe and Vijay Shirpuram; Player of the match: Urvil Patel (Gujarat)
09:00; Scorecard	Gaurav Kochar 60 (37); Hemang Patel 2/21 (2 overs)		Urvil Patel 119* (37); Mohit Rathee 2/39 (3 overs)	Gymkhana Ground, Hyderabad; Umpires: Anish Sahasrabudhe and Vijay Shirpuram; Player of the match: Urvil Patel (Gujarat)
Gujarat won the toss and elected to field; Points: Gujarat 4, Services 0				Gymkhana Ground, Hyderabad; Umpires: Anish Sahasrabudhe and Vijay Shirpuram; Player of the match: Urvil Patel (Gujarat)

26 November 2025	Himachal Pradesh; 147/8 (20 overs)	v	Punjab; 153/5 (13.5 overs)	Punjab won by 5 wickets
11:00; Scorecard	Himachal Pradesh; 147/8 (20 overs)	v	Punjab; 153/5 (13.5 overs)	Rajiv Gandhi International Stadium, Hyderabad; Umpires: Saidharshan Kumar and Saiyed Khalid; Player of the match: Harpreet Brar (Punjab)
11:00; Scorecard	Nikhil Gangta 35* (32); Harpreet Brar 2/14 (4 overs)		Anmolpreet Singh 43 (27); Vaibhav Arora 2/23 (3 overs)	Rajiv Gandhi International Stadium, Hyderabad; Umpires: Saidharshan Kumar and Saiyed Khalid; Player of the match: Harpreet Brar (Punjab)
Punjab won the toss and elected to field; Points: Punjab 4, Himachal Pradesh 0				Rajiv Gandhi International Stadium, Hyderabad; Umpires: Saidharshan Kumar and Saiyed Khalid; Player of the match: Harpreet Brar (Punjab)

26 November 2025	Pondicherry; 201/9 (20 overs)	v	Haryana; 196/6 (20 overs)	Pondicherry won by 5 runs
13:30; Scorecard	Pondicherry; 201/9 (20 overs)	v	Haryana; 196/6 (20 overs)	Gymkhana Ground, Hyderabad; Umpires: Anish Sahasrabudhe and Vijay Shirpuram; Player of the match: Aman Khan (Pondicherry)
13:30; Scorecard	Pugazhendi Akash 60 (23); Samant Jakhar 3/24 (4 overs)		Arsh Ranga 90 (47); Aman Khan 4/28 (4 overs)	Gymkhana Ground, Hyderabad; Umpires: Anish Sahasrabudhe and Vijay Shirpuram; Player of the match: Aman Khan (Pondicherry)
Haryana won the toss and elected to field; Points: Pondicherry 4, Haryana 0				Gymkhana Ground, Hyderabad; Umpires: Anish Sahasrabudhe and Vijay Shirpuram; Player of the match: Aman Khan (Pondicherry)

26 November 2025	Baroda; 181/8 (20 overs)	v	Bengal; 182/4 (17.1 overs)	Bengal won by 6 wickets
16:30 (D/N); Scorecard	Baroda; 181/8 (20 overs)	v	Bengal; 182/4 (17.1 overs)	Rajiv Gandhi International Stadium, Hyderabad; Umpires: Saidharshan Kumar and Saiyed Khalid; Player of the match: Abishek Porel (Bengal)
16:30 (D/N); Scorecard	Bhanu Pania 53* (27); Saksham Choudhary 2/24 (3 overs)		Abishek Porel 50 (24); Ninad Rathva 2/33 (4 overs)	Rajiv Gandhi International Stadium, Hyderabad; Umpires: Saidharshan Kumar and Saiyed Khalid; Player of the match: Abishek Porel (Bengal)
Bengal won the toss and elected to field; Points: Bengal 4, Baroda 0				Rajiv Gandhi International Stadium, Hyderabad; Umpires: Saidharshan Kumar and Saiyed Khalid; Player of the match: Abishek Porel (Bengal)

==== Round 2 ====
28 November 2025	Haryana; 207/9 (20 overs)	v	Punjab; 207/7 (20 overs)	Match tied (Haryana won the Super Over)
09:00; Scorecard	Haryana; 207/9 (20 overs)	v	Punjab; 207/7 (20 overs)	Gymkhana Ground, Hyderabad; Umpires: Saidharshan Kumar and Saiyed Khalid; Player of the match: Anshul Kamboj (Haryana)
09:00; Scorecard	Nishant Sindhu 61 (32); Ashwani Kumar 3/31 (4 overs)		Anmolpreet Singh 81 (37); Anshul Kamboj 2/26 (4 overs)	Gymkhana Ground, Hyderabad; Umpires: Saidharshan Kumar and Saiyed Khalid; Player of the match: Anshul Kamboj (Haryana)
Punjab won the toss and elected to field; Points: Haryana 4, Punjab 0; Super Over: Punjab 1/2 (0.3 overs), Haryana 4/0 (0.1 overs)				Gymkhana Ground, Hyderabad; Umpires: Saidharshan Kumar and Saiyed Khalid; Player of the match: Anshul Kamboj (Haryana)

28 November 2025	Pondicherry; 166/9 (20 overs)	v	Baroda; 149 (18.5 overs)	Pondicherry won by 17 runs
11:00; Scorecard	Pondicherry; 166/9 (20 overs)	v	Baroda; 149 (18.5 overs)	Rajiv Gandhi International Stadium, Hyderabad; Umpires: Anish Sahasrabudhe and Vijay Shirpuram; Player of the match: Aman Khan (Pondicherry)
11:00; Scorecard	Aman Khan 72 (40); Raj Limbani 3/35 (4 overs)		Shivalik Sharma 56 (45); Adil Ayub Tunda 4/30 (3.5 overs)	Rajiv Gandhi International Stadium, Hyderabad; Umpires: Anish Sahasrabudhe and Vijay Shirpuram; Player of the match: Aman Khan (Pondicherry)
Baroda won the toss and elected to field; Points: Pondicherry 4, Baroda 0				Rajiv Gandhi International Stadium, Hyderabad; Umpires: Anish Sahasrabudhe and Vijay Shirpuram; Player of the match: Aman Khan (Pondicherry)

28 November 2025	Himachal Pradesh; 199/6 (20 overs)	v	Services; 116 (16.5 overs)	Himachal Pradesh won by 83 runs
13:30; Scorecard	Himachal Pradesh; 199/6 (20 overs)	v	Services; 116 (16.5 overs)	Gymkhana Ground, Hyderabad; Umpires: Saidharshan Kumar and Saiyed Khalid; Player of the match: Mridul Surroch (Himachal Pradesh)
13:30; Scorecard	Mridul Surroch 75* (35); Vishal Gaur 2/31 (3 overs)		Vineet Dhankhar 32 (19); Arpit Guleria 3/12 (2.5 overs)	Gymkhana Ground, Hyderabad; Umpires: Saidharshan Kumar and Saiyed Khalid; Player of the match: Mridul Surroch (Himachal Pradesh)
Himachal Pradesh won the toss and elected to bat; Points: Himachal Pradesh 4, Services 0				Gymkhana Ground, Hyderabad; Umpires: Saidharshan Kumar and Saiyed Khalid; Player of the match: Mridul Surroch (Himachal Pradesh)

28 November 2025	Gujarat; 127 (18.3 overs)	v	Bengal; 130/7 (18.5 overs)	Bengal won by 3 wickets
16:30 (D/N); Scorecard	Gujarat; 127 (18.3 overs)	v	Bengal; 130/7 (18.5 overs)	Rajiv Gandhi International Stadium, Hyderabad; Umpires: Anish Sahasrabudhe and Vijay Shirpuram; Player of the match: Saksham Choudhary (Bengal)
16:30 (D/N); Scorecard	Vishal Jayswal 36 (30); Saksham Choudhary 3/16 (4 overs)		Abhimanyu Easwaran 34 (34); Hemang Patel 2/24 (4 overs)	Rajiv Gandhi International Stadium, Hyderabad; Umpires: Anish Sahasrabudhe and Vijay Shirpuram; Player of the match: Saksham Choudhary (Bengal)
Bengal won the toss and elected to field; Points: Bengal 4, Gujarat 0				Rajiv Gandhi International Stadium, Hyderabad; Umpires: Anish Sahasrabudhe and Vijay Shirpuram; Player of the match: Saksham Choudhary (Bengal)

==== Round 3 ====
30 November 2025	Punjab; 310/5 (20 overs)	v	Bengal; 198/9 (20 overs)	Punjab won by 112 runs
09:00; Scorecard	Punjab; 310/5 (20 overs)	v	Bengal; 198/9 (20 overs)	Gymkhana Ground, Hyderabad; Umpires: Saidharshan Kumar and Vijay Shirpuram; Player of the match: Abhishek Sharma (Punjab)
09:00; Scorecard	Abhishek Sharma 148 (52); Akash Deep 2/55 (4 overs)		Abhimanyu Easwaran 130* (66); Harpreet Brar 4/23 (4 overs)	Gymkhana Ground, Hyderabad; Umpires: Saidharshan Kumar and Vijay Shirpuram; Player of the match: Abhishek Sharma (Punjab)
Punjab won the toss and elected to bat; Points: Punjab 4, Bengal 0; Abhishek Sharma and Prabhsimran Singh (Punjab) made highest ever opening partnership in Syed Mushtaq Ali Trophy with 205 runs.; Abhishek Sharma (Punjab) became player with most centuries in Syed Mushtaq Ali Trophy by scoring his 5th century in this match.; Abhishek Sharma (Punjab) scored join second-fastest fifty by an indian in men's T20 in 12 balls.; Abhishek Sharma (Punjab) hit second-most sixes in an innings in Syed Mushtaq Ali Trophy with 16 in his innigns.; This match's aggregate of runs was highest match aggregate ever in Syed Mushtaq Ali Trophy with 508 runs scored by both teams.				Gymkhana Ground, Hyderabad; Umpires: Saidharshan Kumar and Vijay Shirpuram; Player of the match: Abhishek Sharma (Punjab)

30 November 2025	Haryana; 142 (19.3 overs)	v	Gujarat; 143/6 (20 overs)	Gujarat won by 4 wickets
11:00; Scorecard	Haryana; 142 (19.3 overs)	v	Gujarat; 143/6 (20 overs)	Rajiv Gandhi International Stadium, Hyderabad; Umpires: Anish Sahasrabudhe and Saiyed Khalid; Player of the match: Saurav Chauhan (Gujarat)
11:00; Scorecard	Yashvardhan Dalal 51 (43); Arzan Nagwaswalla 3/16 (4 overs)		Saurav Chauhan 81* (52); Anshul Kamboj 2/25 (4 overs)	Rajiv Gandhi International Stadium, Hyderabad; Umpires: Anish Sahasrabudhe and Saiyed Khalid; Player of the match: Saurav Chauhan (Gujarat)
Gujarat won the toss and elected to field; Points: Gujarat 4, Haryana 0				Rajiv Gandhi International Stadium, Hyderabad; Umpires: Anish Sahasrabudhe and Saiyed Khalid; Player of the match: Saurav Chauhan (Gujarat)

30 November 2025	Pondicherry; 109/9 (20 overs)	v	Services; 112/3 (13.5 overs)	Services won by 7 wickets
13:30; Scorecard	Pondicherry; 109/9 (20 overs)	v	Services; 112/3 (13.5 overs)	Gymkhana Ground, Hyderabad; Umpires: Saidharshan Kumar and Vijay Shirpuram; Player of the match: Pulkit Narang (Services)
13:30; Scorecard	Ajay Rohera 29 (18); Pulkit Narang 3/19 (4 overs)		Mohit Ahlawat 46* (26); Pugazhendi Akash 1/7 (1 over)	Gymkhana Ground, Hyderabad; Umpires: Saidharshan Kumar and Vijay Shirpuram; Player of the match: Pulkit Narang (Services)
Services won the toss and elected to field; Points: Services 4, Pondicherry 0				Gymkhana Ground, Hyderabad; Umpires: Saidharshan Kumar and Vijay Shirpuram; Player of the match: Pulkit Narang (Services)

30 November 2025	Himachal Pradesh; 142/8 (20 overs)	v	Baroda; 144/5 (17.1 overs)	Baroda won by 5 wickets
16:30 (D/N); Scorecard	Himachal Pradesh; 142/8 (20 overs)	v	Baroda; 144/5 (17.1 overs)	Rajiv Gandhi International Stadium, Hyderabad; Umpires: Anish Sahasrabudhe and Saiyed Khalid; Player of the match: Jitesh Sharma (Baroda)
16:30 (D/N); Scorecard	Innesh Mahajan 50 (41); Mahesh Pithiya 2/23 (4 overs)		Shashwat Rawat 47* (41); Mridul Surroch 2/20 (4 overs)	Rajiv Gandhi International Stadium, Hyderabad; Umpires: Anish Sahasrabudhe and Saiyed Khalid; Player of the match: Jitesh Sharma (Baroda)
Baroda won the toss and elected to field; Points: Baroda 4, Himachal Pradesh 0				Rajiv Gandhi International Stadium, Hyderabad; Umpires: Anish Sahasrabudhe and Saiyed Khalid; Player of the match: Jitesh Sharma (Baroda)

==== Round 4 ====
02 December 2025	Pondicherry; 83 (13.1 overs)	v	Gujarat; 84/1 (9 overs)	Gujarat won by 9 wickets
09:00; Scorecard	Pondicherry; 83 (13.1 overs)	v	Gujarat; 84/1 (9 overs)	Gymkhana Ground, Hyderabad; Umpires: Anish Sahasrabudhe and Saiyed Khalid; Player of the match: Japagnya Bhatt (Gujarat)
09:00; Scorecard	Parameeswaran Sivaraman 20 (20); Ravi Bishnoi 3/13 (2.1 overs)		Abhishek Desai 53* (30); Adil Ayub Tunda 1/15 (2 overs)	Gymkhana Ground, Hyderabad; Umpires: Anish Sahasrabudhe and Saiyed Khalid; Player of the match: Japagnya Bhatt (Gujarat)
Gujarat won the toss and elected to field; Points: Gujarat 4, Pondicherry 0				Gymkhana Ground, Hyderabad; Umpires: Anish Sahasrabudhe and Saiyed Khalid; Player of the match: Japagnya Bhatt (Gujarat)

02 December 2025	Punjab; 222/8 (20 overs)	v	Baroda; 224/3 (19.1 overs)	Baroda won by 7 wickets
11:00; Scorecard	Punjab; 222/8 (20 overs)	v	Baroda; 224/3 (19.1 overs)	Rajiv Gandhi International Stadium, Hyderabad; Umpires: Saidharshan Kumar and Vijay Shirpuram; Player of the match: Hardik Pandya (Baroda)
11:00; Scorecard	Anmolpreet Singh 69 (32); Raj Limbani 3/36 (4 overs)		Hardik Pandya 77* (42); Ramandeep Singh 1/38 (4 overs)	Rajiv Gandhi International Stadium, Hyderabad; Umpires: Saidharshan Kumar and Vijay Shirpuram; Player of the match: Hardik Pandya (Baroda)
Punjab won the toss and elected to bat; Points: Baroda 4, Punjab 0				Rajiv Gandhi International Stadium, Hyderabad; Umpires: Saidharshan Kumar and Vijay Shirpuram; Player of the match: Hardik Pandya (Baroda)

02 December 2025	Himachal Pradesh; 208/5 (20 overs)	v	Bengal; 212/5 (18.4 overs)	Bengal won by 5 wickets
13:30; Scorecard	Himachal Pradesh; 208/5 (20 overs)	v	Bengal; 212/5 (18.4 overs)	Gymkhana Ground, Hyderabad; Umpires: Anish Sahasrabudhe and Saiyed Khalid; Player of the match: Karan Lal (Bengal)
13:30; Scorecard	Ekant Sen 89 (50); Shahbaz Ahmed 3/36 (4 overs)		Karan Lal 113 (50); Mridul Surroch 2/24 (4 overs)	Gymkhana Ground, Hyderabad; Umpires: Anish Sahasrabudhe and Saiyed Khalid; Player of the match: Karan Lal (Bengal)
Himachal Pradesh won the toss and elected to bat; Points: Bengal 4, Himachal Pradesh 0				Gymkhana Ground, Hyderabad; Umpires: Anish Sahasrabudhe and Saiyed Khalid; Player of the match: Karan Lal (Bengal)

02 December 2025	Services; 157/7 (20 overs)	v	Haryana; 160/4 (19 overs)	Haryana won by 6 wickets
16:30 (D/N); Scorecard	Services; 157/7 (20 overs)	v	Haryana; 160/4 (19 overs)	Rajiv Gandhi International Stadium, Hyderabad; Umpires: Saidharshan Kumar and Vijay Shirpuram; Player of the match: Ankit Kumar (Haryana)
16:30 (D/N); Scorecard	Nakul Sharma 57 (47); Anuj Thakral 2/23 (4 overs)		Ankit Kumar 78* (53); Vineet Dhankhar 1/18 (3 overs)	Rajiv Gandhi International Stadium, Hyderabad; Umpires: Saidharshan Kumar and Vijay Shirpuram; Player of the match: Ankit Kumar (Haryana)
Haryana won the toss and elected to field; Points: Haryana 4, Services 0				Rajiv Gandhi International Stadium, Hyderabad; Umpires: Saidharshan Kumar and Vijay Shirpuram; Player of the match: Ankit Kumar (Haryana)

==== Round 5 ====
04 December 2025	Himachal Pradesh; 176/8 (20 overs)	v	Haryana; 177/3 (18 overs)	Haryana won by 7 wickets
09:00; Scorecard	Himachal Pradesh; 176/8 (20 overs)	v	Haryana; 177/3 (18 overs)	Gymkhana Ground, Hyderabad; Umpires: Vijay Shirpuram and Saiyed Khalid; Player of the match: Yashvardhan Dalal (Haryana)
09:00; Scorecard	Ekant Sen 44 (35); Anuj Thakral 3/31 (4 overs)		Yashvardhan Dalal 76* (44); Akash Vasisht 1/17 (2 overs)	Gymkhana Ground, Hyderabad; Umpires: Vijay Shirpuram and Saiyed Khalid; Player of the match: Yashvardhan Dalal (Haryana)
Haryana won the toss and elected to field; Points: Haryana 4, Himachal Pradesh 0				Gymkhana Ground, Hyderabad; Umpires: Vijay Shirpuram and Saiyed Khalid; Player of the match: Yashvardhan Dalal (Haryana)

04 December 2025	Gujarat; 73 (14.1 overs)	v	Baroda; 74/2 (6.4 overs)	Baroda won by 8 wickets
11:00; Scorecard	Gujarat; 73 (14.1 overs)	v	Baroda; 74/2 (6.4 overs)	Rajiv Gandhi International Stadium, Hyderabad; Umpires: Saidharshan Kumar and Anish Sahasrabudhe; Player of the match: Raj Limbani (Baroda)
11:00; Scorecard	Aarya Desai 22 (15); Raj Limbani 3/5 (2.1 overs)		Shashwat Rawat 30* (19); Ravi Bishnoi 2/26 (1.4 overs)	Rajiv Gandhi International Stadium, Hyderabad; Umpires: Saidharshan Kumar and Anish Sahasrabudhe; Player of the match: Raj Limbani (Baroda)
Baroda won the toss and elected to field; Points: Baroda 4, Gujarat 0				Rajiv Gandhi International Stadium, Hyderabad; Umpires: Saidharshan Kumar and Anish Sahasrabudhe; Player of the match: Raj Limbani (Baroda)

04 December 2025	Services; 165 (18.2 overs)	v	Bengal; 167/3 (15.1 overs)	Bengal won by 7 wickets
13:30; Scorecard	Services; 165 (18.2 overs)	v	Bengal; 167/3 (15.1 overs)	Gymkhana Ground, Hyderabad; Umpires: Vijay Shirpuram and Saiyed Khalid; Player of the match: Mohammed Shami (Bengal)
13:30; Scorecard	Mohit Ahlawat 38 (22); Mohammed Shami 4/13 (3.2 overs)		Abhimanyu Easwaran 58 (37); Mohit Rathee 2/38 (3 overs)	Gymkhana Ground, Hyderabad; Umpires: Vijay Shirpuram and Saiyed Khalid; Player of the match: Mohammed Shami (Bengal)
Bengal won the toss and elected to field; Points: Bengal 4, Services 0				Gymkhana Ground, Hyderabad; Umpires: Vijay Shirpuram and Saiyed Khalid; Player of the match: Mohammed Shami (Bengal)

04 December 2025	Punjab; 192/5 (20 overs)	v	Pondicherry; 138 (18.4 overs)	Punjab won by 52 runs
16:30 (D/N); Scorecard	Punjab; 192/5 (20 overs)	v	Pondicherry; 138 (18.4 overs)	Rajiv Gandhi International Stadium, Hyderabad; Umpires: Saidharshan Kumar and Anish Sahasrabudhe; Player of the match: Abhishek Sharma (Punjab)
16:30 (D/N); Scorecard	Salil Arora 44* (25); Vijai Raja 2/14 (3 overs)		Sidak Singh 61 (41); Abhishek Sharma 3/23 (4 overs)	Rajiv Gandhi International Stadium, Hyderabad; Umpires: Saidharshan Kumar and Anish Sahasrabudhe; Player of the match: Abhishek Sharma (Punjab)
Punjab won the toss and elected to bat; Points: Punjab 4, Pondicherry 0				Rajiv Gandhi International Stadium, Hyderabad; Umpires: Saidharshan Kumar and Anish Sahasrabudhe; Player of the match: Abhishek Sharma (Punjab)

==== Round 6 ====
06 December 2025	Pondicherry; 177/5 (20 overs)	v	Bengal; 96 (13.5 overs)	Pondicherry won by 81 runs
09:00; Scorecard	Pondicherry; 177/5 (20 overs)	v	Bengal; 96 (13.5 overs)	Gymkhana Ground, Hyderabad; Umpires: Saidharshan Kumar and Anish Sahasrabudhe; Player of the match: Jayant Yadav (Pondicherry)
09:00; Scorecard	Aman Khan 74 (40); Mohammed Shami 3/34 (4 overs)		Karan Lal 40 (23); Jayant Yadav 4/28 (4 overs)	Gymkhana Ground, Hyderabad; Umpires: Saidharshan Kumar and Anish Sahasrabudhe; Player of the match: Jayant Yadav (Pondicherry)
Bengal won the toss and elected to field; Points: Pondicherry 4, Bengal 0				Gymkhana Ground, Hyderabad; Umpires: Saidharshan Kumar and Anish Sahasrabudhe; Player of the match: Jayant Yadav (Pondicherry)

06 December 2025	Himachal Pradesh; 193/8 (20 overs)	v	Gujarat; 194/9 (20 overs)	Gujarat won by 1 wicket
11:00; Scorecard	Himachal Pradesh; 193/8 (20 overs)	v	Gujarat; 194/9 (20 overs)	Rajiv Gandhi International Stadium, Hyderabad; Umpires: Vijay Shirpuram and Saiyed Khalid; Player of the match: Mridul Surroch (Himachal Pradesh)
11:00; Scorecard	Mridul Surroch 88 (48); Japagnya Bhatt 2/31 (4 overs)		Urvil Patel 39 (11); Mridul Surroch 3/45 (4 overs)	Rajiv Gandhi International Stadium, Hyderabad; Umpires: Vijay Shirpuram and Saiyed Khalid; Player of the match: Mridul Surroch (Himachal Pradesh)
Gujarat won the toss and elected to field; Points: Gujarat 4, Himachal Pradesh 0				Rajiv Gandhi International Stadium, Hyderabad; Umpires: Vijay Shirpuram and Saiyed Khalid; Player of the match: Mridul Surroch (Himachal Pradesh)

06 December 2025	Haryana; 174/7 (20 overs)	v	Baroda; 166/7 (20 overs)	Haryana won by 8 runs
13:30; Scorecard	Haryana; 174/7 (20 overs)	v	Baroda; 166/7 (20 overs)	Gymkhana Ground, Hyderabad; Umpires: Saidharshan Kumar and Anish Sahasrabudhe; Player of the match: Anshul Kamboj (Haryana)
13:30; Scorecard	Yashvardhan Dalal 57* (44); Atit Sheth 2/48 (4 overs)		Atit Sheth 44 (33); Anshul Kamboj 4/23 (4 overs)	Gymkhana Ground, Hyderabad; Umpires: Saidharshan Kumar and Anish Sahasrabudhe; Player of the match: Anshul Kamboj (Haryana)
Baroda won the toss and elected to field; Points: Haryana 4, Baroda 0				Gymkhana Ground, Hyderabad; Umpires: Saidharshan Kumar and Anish Sahasrabudhe; Player of the match: Anshul Kamboj (Haryana)

06 December 2025	Punjab; 233/6 (20 overs)	v	Services; 160 (19.4 overs)	Punjab won by 73 runs
16:30 (D/N); Scorecard	Punjab; 233/6 (20 overs)	v	Services; 160 (19.4 overs)	Rajiv Gandhi International Stadium, Hyderabad; Umpires: Vijay Shirpuram and Saiyed Khalid; Player of the match: Abhishek Sharma (Punjab)
16:30 (D/N); Scorecard	Abhishek Tiwari 62 (34); Abhishek Tiwari 2/43 (4 overs)		Abhishek Tiwari 40 (30); Abhishek Sharma 2/8 (2 overs)	Rajiv Gandhi International Stadium, Hyderabad; Umpires: Vijay Shirpuram and Saiyed Khalid; Player of the match: Abhishek Sharma (Punjab)
Services won the toss and elected to field; Points: Punjab 4, Services 0				Rajiv Gandhi International Stadium, Hyderabad; Umpires: Vijay Shirpuram and Saiyed Khalid; Player of the match: Abhishek Sharma (Punjab)

==== Round 7 ====
08 December 2025	Baroda; 220/5 (20 overs)	v	Services; 207/8 (20 overs)	Baroda won by 13 runs
09:00; Scorecard	Baroda; 220/5 (20 overs)	v	Services; 207/8 (20 overs)	Gymkhana Ground, Hyderabad; Umpires: Saidharshan Kumar and Saiyed Khalid; Player of the match: Amit Pasi (Baroda)
09:00; Scorecard	Amit Pasi 114 (55); Abhishek Tiwari 3/33 (4 overs)		Kunwar Pathak 51 (29); Raj Limbani 3/37 (4 overs)	Gymkhana Ground, Hyderabad; Umpires: Saidharshan Kumar and Saiyed Khalid; Player of the match: Amit Pasi (Baroda)
Baroda won the toss and elected to bat; Points: Baroda 4, Services 0				Gymkhana Ground, Hyderabad; Umpires: Saidharshan Kumar and Saiyed Khalid; Player of the match: Amit Pasi (Baroda)

08 December 2025	Haryana; 191/9 (20 overs)	v	Bengal; 167 (20 overs)	Haryana won by 24 runs
11:00; Scorecard	Haryana; 191/9 (20 overs)	v	Bengal; 167 (20 overs)	Rajiv Gandhi International Stadium, Hyderabad; Umpires: Anish Sahasrabudhe and Vijay Shirpuram; Player of the match: Ishant Bhardwaj (Haryana)
11:00; Scorecard	Nishant Sindhu 48 (31); Mohammed Shami 4/30 (4 overs)		Abishek Porel 47 (24); Ishant Bhardwaj 2/18 (4 overs)	Rajiv Gandhi International Stadium, Hyderabad; Umpires: Anish Sahasrabudhe and Vijay Shirpuram; Player of the match: Ishant Bhardwaj (Haryana)
Bengal won the toss and elected to field; Points: Haryana 4, Bengal 0				Rajiv Gandhi International Stadium, Hyderabad; Umpires: Anish Sahasrabudhe and Vijay Shirpuram; Player of the match: Ishant Bhardwaj (Haryana)

08 December 2025	Punjab; 188/8 (20 overs)	v	Gujarat; 113 (16.1 overs)	Punjab won by 75 runs
13:30; Scorecard	Punjab; 188/8 (20 overs)	v	Gujarat; 113 (16.1 overs)	Gymkhana Ground, Hyderabad; Umpires: Saidharshan Kumar and Saiyed Khalid; Player of the match: Naman Dhir (Punjab)
13:30; Scorecard	Naman Dhir 61 (36); Arzan Nagwaswalla 2/21 (4 overs)		Saurav Chauhan 31 (23); Ashwani Kumar 2/7 (2 overs)	Gymkhana Ground, Hyderabad; Umpires: Saidharshan Kumar and Saiyed Khalid; Player of the match: Naman Dhir (Punjab)
Punjab won the toss and elected to bat; Points: Punjab 4, Gujarat 0				Gymkhana Ground, Hyderabad; Umpires: Saidharshan Kumar and Saiyed Khalid; Player of the match: Naman Dhir (Punjab)

08 December 2025	Pondicherry; 173/4 (20 overs)	v	Himachal Pradesh; 155/9 (20 overs)	Pondicherry won by 18 runs
16:30 (D/N); Scorecard	Pondicherry; 173/4 (20 overs)	v	Himachal Pradesh; 155/9 (20 overs)	Rajiv Gandhi International Stadium, Hyderabad; Umpires: Anish Sahasrabudhe and Vijay Shirpuram; Player of the match: Bhanu Anand (Pondicherry)
16:30 (D/N); Scorecard	Bhanu Anand 56 (38); Mayank Dagar 1/24 (4 overs)		Ekant Sen 56 (38); Adil Ayub Tunda 3/24 (4 overs)	Rajiv Gandhi International Stadium, Hyderabad; Umpires: Anish Sahasrabudhe and Vijay Shirpuram; Player of the match: Bhanu Anand (Pondicherry)
Pondicherry won the toss and elected to bat; Points: Pondicherry 4, Himachal Pradesh 0				Rajiv Gandhi International Stadium, Hyderabad; Umpires: Anish Sahasrabudhe and Vijay Shirpuram; Player of the match: Bhanu Anand (Pondicherry)

=== Group D ===
==== Round 1 ====
26 November 2025	Uttarakhand; 197/5 (20 overs)	v	Karnataka; 198/5 (20 overs)	Karnataka won by 5 wickets
09:00; Scorecard	Uttarakhand; 197/5 (20 overs)	v	Karnataka; 198/5 (20 overs)	Narendra Modi Stadium Ground 'B', Motera, Ahmedabad; Umpires: Ajitesh Argal and Kannur Swaroopanand; Player of the match: Ravichandran Smaran (Karnataka)
09:00; Scorecard	Kunal Chandela 88 (49); Vidwath Kaverappa 3/37 (4 overs)		Ravichandran Smaran 67 (41); Rajan Kumar 3/24 (3 overs)	Narendra Modi Stadium Ground 'B', Motera, Ahmedabad; Umpires: Ajitesh Argal and Kannur Swaroopanand; Player of the match: Ravichandran Smaran (Karnataka)
Karnataka won the toss and elected to field; Points: Karnataka 4, Uttarakhand 0				Narendra Modi Stadium Ground 'B', Motera, Ahmedabad; Umpires: Ajitesh Argal and Kannur Swaroopanand; Player of the match: Ravichandran Smaran (Karnataka)

26 November 2025	Tripura; 123 (19.3 overs)	v	Saurashtra; 124/6 (16 overs)	Saurashtra won by 4 wickets
11:00; Scorecard	Tripura; 123 (19.3 overs)	v	Saurashtra; 124/6 (16 overs)	Narendra Modi Stadium Ground 'A', Motera, Ahmedabad; Umpires: Vineet Kulkarni and Vinod Seshan; Player of the match: Chetan Sakariya (Saurashta)
11:00; Scorecard	Manisankar Murasingh 56 (32); Jaydev Unadkat 3/19 (4 overs)		Ruchit Ahir 29* (15); Swapnil Singh 2/12 (3 overs)	Narendra Modi Stadium Ground 'A', Motera, Ahmedabad; Umpires: Vineet Kulkarni and Vinod Seshan; Player of the match: Chetan Sakariya (Saurashta)
Saurashtra won the toss and elected to field; Points: Saurashtra 4, Tripura 0				Narendra Modi Stadium Ground 'A', Motera, Ahmedabad; Umpires: Vineet Kulkarni and Vinod Seshan; Player of the match: Chetan Sakariya (Saurashta)

26 November 2025	Tamil Nadu; 169/8 (20 overs)	v	Rajasthan; 170/4 (16.3 overs)	Rajasthan won by 6 wickets
13:30; Scorecard	Tamil Nadu; 169/8 (20 overs)	v	Rajasthan; 170/4 (16.3 overs)	Narendra Modi Stadium Ground 'B', Motera, Ahmedabad; Umpires: Ajitesh Argal and Kannur Swaroopanand; Player of the match: Deepak Hooda (Rajasthan)
13:30; Scorecard	Sonu Yadav 43* (25); Ashok Sharma 3/40 (4 overs)		Deepak Hooda 76* (36); T Natarajan 2/16 (3 overs)	Narendra Modi Stadium Ground 'B', Motera, Ahmedabad; Umpires: Ajitesh Argal and Kannur Swaroopanand; Player of the match: Deepak Hooda (Rajasthan)
Tamil Nadu won the toss and elected to bat; Points: Rajasthan 4, Tamil Nadu 0				Narendra Modi Stadium Ground 'B', Motera, Ahmedabad; Umpires: Ajitesh Argal and Kannur Swaroopanand; Player of the match: Deepak Hooda (Rajasthan)

26 November 2025	Delhi; 132 (19.2 overs)	v	Jharkhand; 138/3 (14.5 overs)	Jharkhand won by 7 wickets
16:30 (D/N); Scorecard	Delhi; 132 (19.2 overs)	v	Jharkhand; 138/3 (14.5 overs)	Narendra Modi Stadium Ground 'A', Motera, Ahmedabad; Umpires: Vineet Kulkarni and Vinod Seshan; Player of the match: Utkarsh Singh (Jharkhand)
16:30 (D/N); Scorecard	Priyansh Arya 39 (29); Sushant Mishra 3/25 (4 overs)		Kumar Kushagra 45* (31); Suyash Sharma 1/24 (3 overs)	Narendra Modi Stadium Ground 'A', Motera, Ahmedabad; Umpires: Vineet Kulkarni and Vinod Seshan; Player of the match: Utkarsh Singh (Jharkhand)
Jharkhand won the toss and elected to field; Points: Jharkhand 4, Delhi 0				Narendra Modi Stadium Ground 'A', Motera, Ahmedabad; Umpires: Vineet Kulkarni and Vinod Seshan; Player of the match: Utkarsh Singh (Jharkhand)

==== Round 2 ====
28 November 2025	Tripura; 169/7 (20 overs)	v	Rajasthan; 171/5 (18.5 overs)	Rajasthan won by 5 wickets
09:00; Scorecard	Tripura; 169/7 (20 overs)	v	Rajasthan; 171/5 (18.5 overs)	Narendra Modi Stadium Ground ‘B’, Motera, Ahmedabad; Umpires: Vineet Kulkarni and Vinod Seshan; Player of the match: Shubham Garhwal (Rajasthan)
09:00; Scorecard	Manisankar Murasingh 40 (17); Kamlesh Nagarkoti 3/34 (4 overs)		Shubham Garhwal 50 (20); Swapnil Singh 3/42 (4 overs)	Narendra Modi Stadium Ground ‘B’, Motera, Ahmedabad; Umpires: Vineet Kulkarni and Vinod Seshan; Player of the match: Shubham Garhwal (Rajasthan)
Rajasthan won the toss and elected to field; Points: Rajasthan 4, Tripura 0				Narendra Modi Stadium Ground ‘B’, Motera, Ahmedabad; Umpires: Vineet Kulkarni and Vinod Seshan; Player of the match: Shubham Garhwal (Rajasthan)

28 November 2025	Tamil Nadu; 198/7 (20 overs)	v	Delhi; 203/4 (20 overs)	Delhi won by 6 wickets
11:00; Scorecard	Tamil Nadu; 198/7 (20 overs)	v	Delhi; 203/4 (20 overs)	Narendra Modi Stadium Ground ‘A’, Motera, Ahmedabad; Umpires: Ajitesh Argal and Kannur Swaroopanand; Player of the match: Yash Dhull (Delhi)
11:00; Scorecard	Tushar Raheja 72 (41); Prince Yadav 3/43 (4 overs)		Yash Dhull 71 (46); Sonu Yadav 2/29 (4 overs)	Narendra Modi Stadium Ground ‘A’, Motera, Ahmedabad; Umpires: Ajitesh Argal and Kannur Swaroopanand; Player of the match: Yash Dhull (Delhi)
Delhi won the toss and elected to field; Points: Delhi 4, Tamil Nadu 0				Narendra Modi Stadium Ground ‘A’, Motera, Ahmedabad; Umpires: Ajitesh Argal and Kannur Swaroopanand; Player of the match: Yash Dhull (Delhi)

28 November 2025	Saurashtra; 183/7 (20 overs)	v	Uttarakhand; 184/4 (18.1 overs)	Uttarakhand won by 6 wickets
13:30; Scorecard	Saurashtra; 183/7 (20 overs)	v	Uttarakhand; 184/4 (18.1 overs)	Narendra Modi Stadium Ground ‘B’, Motera, Ahmedabad; Umpires: Vineet Kulkarni and Vinod Seshan; Player of the match: Kunal Chandela (Uttarakhand)
13:30; Scorecard	Prerak Mankad 52 (26); Jagadeesha Suchith 3/20 (4 overs)		Kunal Chandela 94 (54); Chetan Sakariya 2/37 (4 overs)	Narendra Modi Stadium Ground ‘B’, Motera, Ahmedabad; Umpires: Vineet Kulkarni and Vinod Seshan; Player of the match: Kunal Chandela (Uttarakhand)
Saurashtra won the toss and elected to bat; Points: Uttarakhand 4, Saurashtra 0				Narendra Modi Stadium Ground ‘B’, Motera, Ahmedabad; Umpires: Vineet Kulkarni and Vinod Seshan; Player of the match: Kunal Chandela (Uttarakhand)

28 November 2025	Karnataka; 157/9 (20 overs)	v	Jharkhand; 158/8 (19.4 overs)	Jharkhand won by 2 wickets
16:30 (D/N); Scorecard	Karnataka; 157/9 (20 overs)	v	Jharkhand; 158/8 (19.4 overs)	Narendra Modi Stadium Ground ‘A’, Motera, Ahmedabad; Umpires: Ajitesh Argal and Kannur Swaroopanand; Player of the match: Anukul Roy (Jharkhand)
16:30 (D/N); Scorecard	Mayank Agarwal 37 (28); Sushant Mishra 3/39 (4 overs)		Anukul Roy 95* (58); Vidyadhar Patil 3/45 (4 overs)	Narendra Modi Stadium Ground ‘A’, Motera, Ahmedabad; Umpires: Ajitesh Argal and Kannur Swaroopanand; Player of the match: Anukul Roy (Jharkhand)
Jharkhand won the toss and elected to field; Points: Jharkhand 4, Karnataka 0				Narendra Modi Stadium Ground ‘A’, Motera, Ahmedabad; Umpires: Ajitesh Argal and Kannur Swaroopanand; Player of the match: Anukul Roy (Jharkhand)

==== Round 3 ====
30 November 2025	Tripura; 182/7 (20 overs)	v	Jharkhand; 185/2 (17.3 overs)	Jharkhand won by 8 wickets
09:00; Scorecard	Tripura; 182/7 (20 overs)	v	Jharkhand; 185/2 (17.3 overs)	Narendra Modi Stadium Ground ‘B’, Motera, Ahmedabad; Umpires: Tanmay Srivastava and Vineet Kulkarni; Player of the match: Ishan Kishan (Jharkhand)
09:00; Scorecard	Vijay Shankar 59 (41); Anukul Roy 2/29 (4 overs)		Ishan Kishan 113* (50); Saurabh Das 1/37 (3 overs)	Narendra Modi Stadium Ground ‘B’, Motera, Ahmedabad; Umpires: Tanmay Srivastava and Vineet Kulkarni; Player of the match: Ishan Kishan (Jharkhand)
Jharkhand won the toss and elected to field; Points: Jharkhand 4, Tripura 0				Narendra Modi Stadium Ground ‘B’, Motera, Ahmedabad; Umpires: Tanmay Srivastava and Vineet Kulkarni; Player of the match: Ishan Kishan (Jharkhand)

30 November 2025	Karnataka; 201/5 (20 overs)	v	Rajasthan; 200/8 (20 overs)	Rajasthan won by 1 run
11:00; Scorecard	Karnataka; 201/5 (20 overs)	v	Rajasthan; 200/8 (20 overs)	Narendra Modi Stadium Ground ‘A’, Motera, Ahmedabad; Umpires: Ajitesh Argal and Kannur Swaroopanand; Player of the match: Akash Singh (Rajasthan)
11:00; Scorecard	Mahipal Lomror 48* (30); Vijaykumar Vyshak 2/39 (4 overs)		Karun Nair 51 (32); Ashok Sharma 3/43 (4 overs)	Narendra Modi Stadium Ground ‘A’, Motera, Ahmedabad; Umpires: Ajitesh Argal and Kannur Swaroopanand; Player of the match: Akash Singh (Rajasthan)
Karnataka won the toss and elected to field; Points: Rajasthan 4, Karnataka 0				Narendra Modi Stadium Ground ‘A’, Motera, Ahmedabad; Umpires: Ajitesh Argal and Kannur Swaroopanand; Player of the match: Akash Singh (Rajasthan)

30 November 2025	Uttarakhand; 164/6 (20 overs)	v	Tamil Nadu; 168/5 (17.1 overs)	Tamil Nadu won by 5 wickets
13:30; Scorecard	Uttarakhand; 164/6 (20 overs)	v	Tamil Nadu; 168/5 (17.1 overs)	Narendra Modi Stadium Ground ‘B’, Motera, Ahmedabad; Umpires: Tanmay Srivastava and Vineet Kulkarni; Player of the match: R Rajkumar (Tamil Nadu)
13:30; Scorecard	Yuvraj Chaudhary 74 (53); Varun Chakravarthy 1/28 (4 overs)		R Rajkumar 93* (43); Yuvraj Chaudhary 2/21 (3 overs)	Narendra Modi Stadium Ground ‘B’, Motera, Ahmedabad; Umpires: Tanmay Srivastava and Vineet Kulkarni; Player of the match: R Rajkumar (Tamil Nadu)
Tamil Nadu won the toss and elected to field; Points: Tamil Nadu 4, Uttarakhand 0				Narendra Modi Stadium Ground ‘B’, Motera, Ahmedabad; Umpires: Tanmay Srivastava and Vineet Kulkarni; Player of the match: R Rajkumar (Tamil Nadu)

30 November 2025	Delhi; 207/4 (20 overs)	v	Saurashtra; 197/5 (20 overs)	Delhi won by 10 runs
16:30 (D/N); Scorecard	Delhi; 207/4 (20 overs)	v	Saurashtra; 197/5 (20 overs)	Narendra Modi Stadium Ground ‘A’, Motera, Ahmedabad; Umpires: Ajitesh Argal and Kannur Swaroopanand; Player of the match: Suyash Sharma (Delhi)
16:30 (D/N); Scorecard	Nitish Rana 76 (41); Jaydev Unadkat 1/22 (4 overs)		Prerak Mankad 50 (28); Suyash Sharma 3/20 (4 overs)	Narendra Modi Stadium Ground ‘A’, Motera, Ahmedabad; Umpires: Ajitesh Argal and Kannur Swaroopanand; Player of the match: Suyash Sharma (Delhi)
Saurashtra won the toss and elected to field; Points: Delhi 4, Saurashtra 0; Jaydev Unadkat (Saurashtra) became highest wicket-taker in Syed Mushtaq Ali Trophy by surpassing Siddharth Kaul's 120 wickets.				Narendra Modi Stadium Ground ‘A’, Motera, Ahmedabad; Umpires: Ajitesh Argal and Kannur Swaroopanand; Player of the match: Suyash Sharma (Delhi)

==== Round 4 ====
02 December 2025	Karnataka; 245/3 (20 overs)	v	Tamil Nadu; 100 (14.2 overs)	Karnataka won by 145 runs
09:00; Scorecard	Karnataka; 245/3 (20 overs)	v	Tamil Nadu; 100 (14.2 overs)	Narendra Modi Stadium Ground ‘B’, Motera, Ahmedabad; Umpires: Kannur Swaroopanand and Tanmay Srivastava; Player of the match: Devdutt Padikkal (Karnataka)
09:00; Scorecard	Devdutt Padikkal 102* (46); Sonu Yadav 2/34 (4 overs)		Tushar Raheja 29 (18); Praveen Dubey 3/15 (2.2 overs)	Narendra Modi Stadium Ground ‘B’, Motera, Ahmedabad; Umpires: Kannur Swaroopanand and Tanmay Srivastava; Player of the match: Devdutt Padikkal (Karnataka)
Tamil Nadu won the toss and elected to field; Points: Karnataka 4, Tamil Nadu 0				Narendra Modi Stadium Ground ‘B’, Motera, Ahmedabad; Umpires: Kannur Swaroopanand and Tanmay Srivastava; Player of the match: Devdutt Padikkal (Karnataka)

02 December 2025	Tripura; 157/5 (20 overs)	v	Delhi; 145/8 (20 overs)	Tripura won by 12 runs
11:00; Scorecard	Tripura; 157/5 (20 overs)	v	Delhi; 145/8 (20 overs)	Narendra Modi Stadium Ground ‘A’, Motera, Ahmedabad; Umpires: Ajitesh Argal and Vinod Seshan; Player of the match: Manisankar Murasingh (Tripura)
11:00; Scorecard	Sridam Paul 29 (20); Suyash Sharma 2/16 (4 overs)		Nitish Rana 45 (40); Manisankar Murasingh 2/19 (4 overs)	Narendra Modi Stadium Ground ‘A’, Motera, Ahmedabad; Umpires: Ajitesh Argal and Vinod Seshan; Player of the match: Manisankar Murasingh (Tripura)
Tripura won the toss and elected to bat; Points: Tripura 4, Delhi 0				Narendra Modi Stadium Ground ‘A’, Motera, Ahmedabad; Umpires: Ajitesh Argal and Vinod Seshan; Player of the match: Manisankar Murasingh (Tripura)

02 December 2025	Jharkhand; 209/8 (20 overs)	v	Saurashtra; 125 (15.1 overs)	Jharkhand won by 84 runs
13:30; Scorecard	Jharkhand; 209/8 (20 overs)	v	Saurashtra; 125 (15.1 overs)	Narendra Modi Stadium Ground ‘B’, Motera, Ahmedabad; Umpires: Kannur Swaroopanand and Tanmay Srivastava; Player of the match: Ishan Kishan (Jharkhand)
13:30; Scorecard	Ishan Kishan 93 (50); Chetan Sakariya 3/42 (4 overs)		Prerak Mankad 39 (19); Anukul Roy 3/25 (4 overs)	Narendra Modi Stadium Ground ‘B’, Motera, Ahmedabad; Umpires: Kannur Swaroopanand and Tanmay Srivastava; Player of the match: Ishan Kishan (Jharkhand)
Jharkhand won the toss and elected to bat; Points: Jharkhand 4, Saurashtra 0				Narendra Modi Stadium Ground ‘B’, Motera, Ahmedabad; Umpires: Kannur Swaroopanand and Tanmay Srivastava; Player of the match: Ishan Kishan (Jharkhand)

02 December 2025	Rajasthan; 193/8 (20 overs)	v	Uttarakhand; 120 (18 overs)	Rajasthan won by 73 runs
16:30 (D/N); Scorecard	Rajasthan; 193/8 (20 overs)	v	Uttarakhand; 120 (18 overs)	Narendra Modi Stadium Ground ‘A’, Motera, Ahmedabad; Umpires: Ajitesh Argal and Vinod Seshan; Player of the match: Deepak Hooda (Rajasthan)
16:30 (D/N); Scorecard	Deepak Hooda 90* (50); Rajan Kumar 4/37 (4 overs)		Shashwat Dangwal 25 (19); Ashok Sharma 4/16 (3 overs)	Narendra Modi Stadium Ground ‘A’, Motera, Ahmedabad; Umpires: Ajitesh Argal and Vinod Seshan; Player of the match: Deepak Hooda (Rajasthan)
Uttarakhand won the toss and elected to field; Points: Rajasthan 4, Uttarakhand 0				Narendra Modi Stadium Ground ‘A’, Motera, Ahmedabad; Umpires: Ajitesh Argal and Vinod Seshan; Player of the match: Deepak Hooda (Rajasthan)

==== Round 5 ====
04 December 2025	Saurashtra; 145 (19.3 overs)	v	Rajasthan; 146/8 (19.5 overs)	Rajasthan won by 2 wickets
09:00; Scorecard	Saurashtra; 145 (19.3 overs)	v	Rajasthan; 146/8 (19.5 overs)	Narendra Modi Stadium Ground ‘B’, Motera, Ahmedabad; Umpires: Tanmay Srivastava and Vineet Kulkarni; Player of the match: Ashok Sharma (Rajasthan)
09:00; Scorecard	Vishvaraj Jadeja 69 (40); Ashok Sharma 4/20 (4 overs)		Kamlesh Nagarkoti 37* (32); Parth Bhut 3/9 (4 overs)	Narendra Modi Stadium Ground ‘B’, Motera, Ahmedabad; Umpires: Tanmay Srivastava and Vineet Kulkarni; Player of the match: Ashok Sharma (Rajasthan)
Rajasthan won the toss and elected to field; Points: Rajasthan 4, Saurashtra 0				Narendra Modi Stadium Ground ‘B’, Motera, Ahmedabad; Umpires: Tanmay Srivastava and Vineet Kulkarni; Player of the match: Ashok Sharma (Rajasthan)

04 December 2025	Uttarakhand; 150/7 (20 overs)	v	Jharkhand; 152/3 (16.1 overs)	Jharkhand won by 7 wickets
11:00; Scorecard	Uttarakhand; 150/7 (20 overs)	v	Jharkhand; 152/3 (16.1 overs)	Narendra Modi Stadium Ground ‘A’, Motera, Ahmedabad; Umpires: Ajitesh Argal and Vinod Seshan; Player of the match: Anukul Roy (Jharkhand)
11:00; Scorecard	Kunal Chandela 55 (42); Anukul Roy 3/20 (4 overs)		Virat Singh 43* (22); Avneesh Sudha 2/28 (4 overs)	Narendra Modi Stadium Ground ‘A’, Motera, Ahmedabad; Umpires: Ajitesh Argal and Vinod Seshan; Player of the match: Anukul Roy (Jharkhand)
Jharkhand won the toss and elected to field; Points: Jharkhand 4, Uttarakhand 0				Narendra Modi Stadium Ground ‘A’, Motera, Ahmedabad; Umpires: Ajitesh Argal and Vinod Seshan; Player of the match: Anukul Roy (Jharkhand)

04 December 2025	Delhi; 232/3 (20 overs)	v	Karnataka; 187 (19.3 overs)	Delhi won by 45 runs
13:30; Scorecard	Delhi; 232/3 (20 overs)	v	Karnataka; 187 (19.3 overs)	Narendra Modi Stadium Ground ‘B’, Motera, Ahmedabad; Umpires: Tanmay Srivastava and Vineet Kulkarni; Player of the match: Ayush Badoni (Delhi)
13:30; Scorecard	Priyansh Arya 62 (33); Shubhang Hegde 2/31 (4 overs)		Ravichandran Smaran 72 (38); Ayush Badoni 4/12 (2 overs)	Narendra Modi Stadium Ground ‘B’, Motera, Ahmedabad; Umpires: Tanmay Srivastava and Vineet Kulkarni; Player of the match: Ayush Badoni (Delhi)
Delhi won the toss and elected to bat; Points: Delhi 4, Karnataka 0				Narendra Modi Stadium Ground ‘B’, Motera, Ahmedabad; Umpires: Tanmay Srivastava and Vineet Kulkarni; Player of the match: Ayush Badoni (Delhi)

04 December 2025	Tamil Nadu; 204/5 (20 overs)	v	Tripura; 143 (18.5 overs)	Tamil Nadu won by 61 runs
16:30 (D/N); Scorecard	Tamil Nadu; 204/5 (20 overs)	v	Tripura; 143 (18.5 overs)	Narendra Modi Stadium Ground ‘A’, Motera, Ahmedabad; Umpires: Ajitesh Argal and Vinod Seshan; Player of the match: Sai Kishore (Tamil Nadu)
16:30 (D/N); Scorecard	Sai Kishore 87* (39); Saurabh Das 2/24 (4 overs)		Vijay Shankar 39 (34); T Natarajan 2/22 (4 overs)	Narendra Modi Stadium Ground ‘A’, Motera, Ahmedabad; Umpires: Ajitesh Argal and Vinod Seshan; Player of the match: Sai Kishore (Tamil Nadu)
Tripura won the toss and elected to field; Points: Tamil Nadu 4, Tripura 0				Narendra Modi Stadium Ground ‘A’, Motera, Ahmedabad; Umpires: Ajitesh Argal and Vinod Seshan; Player of the match: Sai Kishore (Tamil Nadu)

==== Round 6 ====
06 December 2025	Jharkhand; 207/3 (20 overs)	v	Tamil Nadu; 179/7 (20 overs)	Jharkhand won by 28 runs
09:00; Scorecard	Jharkhand; 207/3 (20 overs)	v	Tamil Nadu; 179/7 (20 overs)	Narendra Modi Stadium Ground ‘B’, Motera, Ahmedabad; Umpires: Swaroopanand Kannur and Vineet Kulkarni; Player of the match: Kumar Kushagra (Jharkhand)
09:00; Scorecard	Kumar Kushagra 84* (48); R Rajkumar 1/7 (1 over)		Sai Sudharsan 64 (42); Bal Krishna 2/29 (4 overs)	Narendra Modi Stadium Ground ‘B’, Motera, Ahmedabad; Umpires: Swaroopanand Kannur and Vineet Kulkarni; Player of the match: Kumar Kushagra (Jharkhand)
Tamil Nadu won the toss and elected to field; Points: Jharkhand 4, Tamil Nadu 0				Narendra Modi Stadium Ground ‘B’, Motera, Ahmedabad; Umpires: Swaroopanand Kannur and Vineet Kulkarni; Player of the match: Kumar Kushagra (Jharkhand)

06 December 2025	Saurashtra; 178/7 (20 overs)	v	Karnataka; 177/9 (20 overs)	Saurashtra won by 1 run
11:00; Scorecard	Saurashtra; 178/7 (20 overs)	v	Karnataka; 177/9 (20 overs)	Narendra Modi Stadium Ground ‘A’, Motera, Ahmedabad; Umpires: Ajitesh Argal and Tanmay Srivastava; Player of the match: Chetan Sakariya (Saurashtra)
11:00; Scorecard	Siddhant Rana 42 (27); Vijaykumar Vyshak 3/28 (4 overs)		Devdutt Padikkal 66 (46); Jaydev Unadkat 2/29 (4 overs)	Narendra Modi Stadium Ground ‘A’, Motera, Ahmedabad; Umpires: Ajitesh Argal and Tanmay Srivastava; Player of the match: Chetan Sakariya (Saurashtra)
Saurashtra won the toss and elected to bat; Points: Saurashtra 4, Karnataka 0				Narendra Modi Stadium Ground ‘A’, Motera, Ahmedabad; Umpires: Ajitesh Argal and Tanmay Srivastava; Player of the match: Chetan Sakariya (Saurashtra)

06 December 2025	Delhi; 175/5 (20 overs)	v	Rajasthan; 177/7 (20 overs)	Rajasthan won by 3 wickets
13:30; Scorecard	Delhi; 175/5 (20 overs)	v	Rajasthan; 177/7 (20 overs)	Narendra Modi Stadium Ground ‘B’, Motera, Ahmedabad; Umpires: Swaroopanand Kannur and Vineet Kulkarni; Player of the match: Mukul Choudhary (Rajasthan)
13:30; Scorecard	Yash Dhull 38 (31); Manav Suthar 2/18 (4 overs)		Mukul Choudhary 62* (26); Navdeep Saini 3/15 (4 overs)	Narendra Modi Stadium Ground ‘B’, Motera, Ahmedabad; Umpires: Swaroopanand Kannur and Vineet Kulkarni; Player of the match: Mukul Choudhary (Rajasthan)
Delhi won the toss and elected to bat; Points: Rajasthan 4, Delhi 0				Narendra Modi Stadium Ground ‘B’, Motera, Ahmedabad; Umpires: Swaroopanand Kannur and Vineet Kulkarni; Player of the match: Mukul Choudhary (Rajasthan)

06 December 2025	Tripura; 163/6 (20 overs)	v	Uttarakhand; 167/6 (20 overs)	Uttarakhand won by 4 wickets
16:30 (D/N); Scorecard	Tripura; 163/6 (20 overs)	v	Uttarakhand; 167/6 (20 overs)	Narendra Modi Stadium Ground ‘A’, Motera, Ahmedabad; Umpires: Ajitesh Argal and Tanmay Srivastava; Player of the match: Jagadeesha Suchith (Uttarakhand)
16:30 (D/N); Scorecard	Tejasvi Jaiswal 51 (37); Rajan Kumar 2/18 (4 overs)		Kunal Chandela 51 (37); Swapnil Singh 3/21 (4 overs)	Narendra Modi Stadium Ground ‘A’, Motera, Ahmedabad; Umpires: Ajitesh Argal and Tanmay Srivastava; Player of the match: Jagadeesha Suchith (Uttarakhand)
Tripura won the toss and elected to bat; Points: Uttarakhand 4, Tripura 0				Narendra Modi Stadium Ground ‘A’, Motera, Ahmedabad; Umpires: Ajitesh Argal and Tanmay Srivastava; Player of the match: Jagadeesha Suchith (Uttarakhand)

==== Round 7 ====
08 December 2025	Delhi; 162/7 (20 overs)	v	Uttarakhand; 144/7 (20 overs)	Delhi won by 18 runs
09:00; Scorecard	Delhi; 162/7 (20 overs)	v	Uttarakhand; 144/7 (20 overs)	Narendra Modi Stadium Ground ‘B’, Motera, Ahmedabad; Umpires: Tanmay Srivastava and Vinod Seshan; Player of the match: Nitish Rana (Delhi)
09:00; Scorecard	Yash Dhull 52 (37); Agrim Tiwari 2/18 (3 overs)		Prashant Chopra 54 (50); Digvesh Rathi 2/22 (4 overs)	Narendra Modi Stadium Ground ‘B’, Motera, Ahmedabad; Umpires: Tanmay Srivastava and Vinod Seshan; Player of the match: Nitish Rana (Delhi)
Uttarakhand won the toss and elected to field; Points: Delhi 4, Uttarakhand 0				Narendra Modi Stadium Ground ‘B’, Motera, Ahmedabad; Umpires: Tanmay Srivastava and Vinod Seshan; Player of the match: Nitish Rana (Delhi)

08 December 2025	Jharkhand; 215/5 (20 overs)	v	Rajasthan; 179 (19.2 overs)	Jharkhand won by 36 runs
11:00; Scorecard	Jharkhand; 215/5 (20 overs)	v	Rajasthan; 179 (19.2 overs)	Narendra Modi Stadium Ground ‘A’, Motera, Ahmedabad; Umpires: Kannur Swaroopanand and Vineet Kulkarni; Player of the match: Virat Singh (Jharkhand)
11:00; Scorecard	Virat Singh 69 (36); Kukna Ajay Singh 1/23 (3 overs)		Karan Lamba 52 (37); Sushant Mishra 3/21 (3.2 overs)	Narendra Modi Stadium Ground ‘A’, Motera, Ahmedabad; Umpires: Kannur Swaroopanand and Vineet Kulkarni; Player of the match: Virat Singh (Jharkhand)
Jharkhand won the toss and elected to bat; Points: Jharkhand 4, Rajasthan 0				Narendra Modi Stadium Ground ‘A’, Motera, Ahmedabad; Umpires: Kannur Swaroopanand and Vineet Kulkarni; Player of the match: Virat Singh (Jharkhand)

08 December 2025	Karnataka; 197/6 (20 overs)	v	Tripura; 197/8 (20 overs)	Match tied (Tripura won the Super Over)
13:30; Scorecard	Karnataka; 197/6 (20 overs)	v	Tripura; 197/8 (20 overs)	Narendra Modi Stadium Ground ‘B’, Motera, Ahmedabad; Umpires: Tanmay Srivastava and Vinod Seshan; Player of the match: Manisankar Murasingh (Tripura)
13:30; Scorecard	BR Sharath 44 (20); Manisankar Murasingh 2/30 (4 overs)		Manisankar Murasingh 69 (35); Praveen Dubey 2/6 (2 overs)	Narendra Modi Stadium Ground ‘B’, Motera, Ahmedabad; Umpires: Tanmay Srivastava and Vinod Seshan; Player of the match: Manisankar Murasingh (Tripura)
Karnataka won the toss and elected to bat; Super Over: Tripura 22/0 (1 over), Karnataka 18/1 (1 over); Points: Tripura 4, Karnataka 0				Narendra Modi Stadium Ground ‘B’, Motera, Ahmedabad; Umpires: Tanmay Srivastava and Vinod Seshan; Player of the match: Manisankar Murasingh (Tripura)

08 December 2025	Saurashtra; 183/7 (20 overs)	v	Tamil Nadu; 185/7 (18.4 overs)	Tamil Nadu won by 3 wickets
16:30 (D/N); Scorecard	Saurashtra; 183/7 (20 overs)	v	Tamil Nadu; 185/7 (18.4 overs)	Narendra Modi Stadium Ground ‘A’, Motera, Ahmedabad; Umpires: Kannur Swaroopanand and Vineet Kulkarni; Player of the match: Sai Sudharsan (Tamil Nadu)
16:30 (D/N); Scorecard	Vishvaraj Jadeja 70 (39); Ragupathy Silambarasan 3/30 (4 overs)		Sai Sudharsan 101* (55); Jaydev Unadkat 3/30 (4 overs)	Narendra Modi Stadium Ground ‘A’, Motera, Ahmedabad; Umpires: Kannur Swaroopanand and Vineet Kulkarni; Player of the match: Sai Sudharsan (Tamil Nadu)
Saurashtra won the toss and elected to bat; Points: Tamil Nadu 4, Saurashtra 0				Narendra Modi Stadium Ground ‘A’, Motera, Ahmedabad; Umpires: Kannur Swaroopanand and Vineet Kulkarni; Player of the match: Sai Sudharsan (Tamil Nadu)

=== Plate Group ===
==== Round 1 ====
26 November 2025	Mizoram; 198/6 (20 overs)	v	Nagaland; 182/9 (20 overs)	Mizoram won by 16 runs
09:00; Scorecard	Mizoram; 198/6 (20 overs)	v	Nagaland; 182/9 (20 overs)	Deccan Gymkhana Cricket Ground, Pune; Umpires: K Nidhin and S Nishaanth; Player of the match: KC Cariappa (Mizoram)
09:00; Scorecard	KC Cariappa 48 (23); Imliwati Lemtur 3/47 (4 overs)		Sedezhalie Rupero 34 (26); KC Cariappa 3/29 (4 overs)	Deccan Gymkhana Cricket Ground, Pune; Umpires: K Nidhin and S Nishaanth; Player of the match: KC Cariappa (Mizoram)
Nagaland won the toss and elected to field; Points: Mizoram 4, Nagaland 0				Deccan Gymkhana Cricket Ground, Pune; Umpires: K Nidhin and S Nishaanth; Player of the match: KC Cariappa (Mizoram)

26 November 2025	Meghalaya; 190/7 (20 overs)	v	Sikkim; 181/4 (20 overs)	Meghalaya won by 9 runs
11:00; Scorecard	Meghalaya; 190/7 (20 overs)	v	Sikkim; 181/4 (20 overs)	Veerangan Cricket Academy Ground, Pune; Umpires: Chirra Ravikanthreddy and Pranav Joshi; Player of the match: Kishan Lyngdoh (Meghalaya)
11:00; Scorecard	Kishan Lyngdoh 115 (67); Md Saptulla 4/18 (3 overs)		Kranthi Kumar 66* (34); Himan Phukan 1/22 (2 overs)	Veerangan Cricket Academy Ground, Pune; Umpires: Chirra Ravikanthreddy and Pranav Joshi; Player of the match: Kishan Lyngdoh (Meghalaya)
Sikkim won the toss and elected to field; Points: Meghalaya 4, Sikkim 0				Veerangan Cricket Academy Ground, Pune; Umpires: Chirra Ravikanthreddy and Pranav Joshi; Player of the match: Kishan Lyngdoh (Meghalaya)

26 November 2025	Manipur; 207/3 (20 overs)	v	Arunchal Pradesh; 117/9 (20 overs)	Manipur won by 90 runs
13:30; Scorecard	Manipur; 207/3 (20 overs)	v	Arunchal Pradesh; 117/9 (20 overs)	Deccan Gymkhana Cricket Ground, Pune; Umpires: K Nidhin and S Nishaanth; Player of the match: Kangabam Priyojit (Manipur)
13:30; Scorecard	Kangabam Priyojit 101* (48); Ayush Awasthi 1/23 (4 overs)		Neelam Obi 36 (33); Pheiroijam Jotin 3/23 (4 overs)	Deccan Gymkhana Cricket Ground, Pune; Umpires: K Nidhin and S Nishaanth; Player of the match: Kangabam Priyojit (Manipur)
Manipur won the toss and elected to bat; Points: Manipur 4, Arunachal Pradesh 0				Deccan Gymkhana Cricket Ground, Pune; Umpires: K Nidhin and S Nishaanth; Player of the match: Kangabam Priyojit (Manipur)

==== Round 2 ====
28 November 2025	Manipur; 143 (19.5 overs)	v	Meghalaya; 118 (19.4 overs)	Manipur won by 25 runs
11:00; Scorecard	Manipur; 143 (19.5 overs)	v	Meghalaya; 118 (19.4 overs)	MCA Cricket Stadium, Gahunje, Pune; Umpires: Chirra Ravikanthreddy and Pranav Joshi; Player of the match: Kangabam Priyojit (Manipur)
11:00; Scorecard	Kangabam Priyojit 60 (29); Swarajeet Das 4/20 (3.5 overs)		Ram Gurung 24 (18); Bishworjit Konthoujam 3/17 (3.4 overs)	MCA Cricket Stadium, Gahunje, Pune; Umpires: Chirra Ravikanthreddy and Pranav Joshi; Player of the match: Kangabam Priyojit (Manipur)
Manipur won the toss and elected to bat; Points: Manipur 4, Meghalaya 0				MCA Cricket Stadium, Gahunje, Pune; Umpires: Chirra Ravikanthreddy and Pranav Joshi; Player of the match: Kangabam Priyojit (Manipur)

28 November 2025	Mizoram; 148/6 (20 overs)	v	Sikkim; 149/3 (17.2 overs)	Sikkim won by 7 wickets
11:00; Scorecard	Mizoram; 148/6 (20 overs)	v	Sikkim; 149/3 (17.2 overs)	Deccan Gymkhana Cricket Ground, Pune; Umpires: K Nidhin and S Nishaanth; Player of the match: Gurinder Singh (Sikkim)
11:00; Scorecard	KC Cariappa 72* (41); Gurinder Singh 3/21 (4 overs)		K Sai Satwik 72* (52); B Lalnunfela 1/18 (3 overs)	Deccan Gymkhana Cricket Ground, Pune; Umpires: K Nidhin and S Nishaanth; Player of the match: Gurinder Singh (Sikkim)
Sikkim won the toss and elected to field; Points: Sikkim 4, Mizoram 0				Deccan Gymkhana Cricket Ground, Pune; Umpires: K Nidhin and S Nishaanth; Player of the match: Gurinder Singh (Sikkim)

28 November 2025	Nagaland; 214/4 (20 overs)	v	Arunchal Pradesh; 97 (16.5 overs)	Nagaland won by 117 runs
16:30 (D/N); Scorecard	Nagaland; 214/4 (20 overs)	v	Arunchal Pradesh; 97 (16.5 overs)	MCA Cricket Stadium, Gahunje, Pune; Umpires: Chirra Ravikanthreddy and Pranav Joshi; Player of the match: Joshua Ozukum (Nagaland)
16:30 (D/N); Scorecard	Joshua Ozukum 74 (40); Nabam Tempol 2/30 (4 overs)		Kara Hakap 37 (37); Rongsen Jonathan 4/10 (3.5 overs)	MCA Cricket Stadium, Gahunje, Pune; Umpires: Chirra Ravikanthreddy and Pranav Joshi; Player of the match: Joshua Ozukum (Nagaland)
Arunachal Pradesh won the toss and elected to field; Points: Nagaland 4, Arunachal Pradesh 0				MCA Cricket Stadium, Gahunje, Pune; Umpires: Chirra Ravikanthreddy and Pranav Joshi; Player of the match: Joshua Ozukum (Nagaland)

==== Round 3 ====
30 November 2025	Mizoram; 186/3 (20 overs)	v	Manipur; 157/7 (20 overs)	Mizoram won by 29 runs
11:00; Scorecard	Mizoram; 186/3 (20 overs)	v	Manipur; 157/7 (20 overs)	MCA Cricket Stadium, Gahunje, Pune; Umpires: Pranav Joshi and S Nishaanth; Player of the match: Codanda Ajit Karthik (Mizoram)
11:00; Scorecard	Codanda Ajit Karthik 64 (39); L Kishan Singha 1/36 (4 overs)		Johnson Singh 75* (58); B Lalnunfela 2/13 (2 overs)	MCA Cricket Stadium, Gahunje, Pune; Umpires: Pranav Joshi and S Nishaanth; Player of the match: Codanda Ajit Karthik (Mizoram)
Mizoram won the toss and elected to bat; Points: Mizoram 4, Manipur 0				MCA Cricket Stadium, Gahunje, Pune; Umpires: Pranav Joshi and S Nishaanth; Player of the match: Codanda Ajit Karthik (Mizoram)

28 November 2025	Arunchal Pradesh; 118/7 (20 overs)	v	Meghalaya; 123/4 (15 overs)	Meghalaya won by 6 wickets
11:00; Scorecard	Arunchal Pradesh; 118/7 (20 overs)	v	Meghalaya; 123/4 (15 overs)	Deccan Gymkhana Cricket Ground, Pune; Umpires: Chirra Ravikanthreddy and K Nidhin; Player of the match: Kishan Lyngdoh (Meghalaya)
11:00; Scorecard	Techi Neri 32 (42); Swarajeet Das 2/19 (3 overs)		Kishan Lyngdoh 57* (42); TNR Mohith 2/27 (4 overs)	Deccan Gymkhana Cricket Ground, Pune; Umpires: Chirra Ravikanthreddy and K Nidhin; Player of the match: Kishan Lyngdoh (Meghalaya)
Arunachal Pradesh won the toss and elected to bat; Points: Meghalaya 4, Arunachal Pradesh 0				Deccan Gymkhana Cricket Ground, Pune; Umpires: Chirra Ravikanthreddy and K Nidhin; Player of the match: Kishan Lyngdoh (Meghalaya)

28 November 2025	Nagaland; 101 (19 overs)	v	Sikkim; 105/3 (12.4 overs)	Sikkim won by 7 wickets
16:30 (D/N); Scorecard	Nagaland; 101 (19 overs)	v	Sikkim; 105/3 (12.4 overs)	MCA Cricket Stadium, Gahunje, Pune; Umpires: Pranav Joshi and S Nishaanth; Player of the match: Gurinder Singh (Sikkim)
16:30 (D/N); Scorecard	Dega Nischal 33 (26); Gurinder Singh 4/14 (4 overs)		K Sai Satwik 44* (34); Akavi Yeptho 1/15 (2 overs)	MCA Cricket Stadium, Gahunje, Pune; Umpires: Pranav Joshi and S Nishaanth; Player of the match: Gurinder Singh (Sikkim)
Nagaland won the toss and elected to bat; Points: Sikkim 4, Nagaland 0				MCA Cricket Stadium, Gahunje, Pune; Umpires: Pranav Joshi and S Nishaanth; Player of the match: Gurinder Singh (Sikkim)

==== Round 4 ====
02 December 2025	Nagaland; 139/6 (20 overs)	v	Meghalaya; 81 (16 overs)	Nagaland won by 58 runs
11:00; Scorecard	Nagaland; 139/6 (20 overs)	v	Meghalaya; 81 (16 overs)	MCA Cricket Stadium, Gahunje, Pune; Umpires: Chirra Ravikanthreddy and K Nidhin; Player of the match: Sedezhalie Rupero (Nagaland)
11:00; Scorecard	Sedezhalie Rupero 53 (48); Akash Choudhary 4/30 (4 overs)		Kush Agarwal 19 (22); Imliwati Lemtur 2/9 (3 overs)	MCA Cricket Stadium, Gahunje, Pune; Umpires: Chirra Ravikanthreddy and K Nidhin; Player of the match: Sedezhalie Rupero (Nagaland)
Meghalaya won the toss and elected to field; Points: Nagaland 4, Meghalaya 0				MCA Cricket Stadium, Gahunje, Pune; Umpires: Chirra Ravikanthreddy and K Nidhin; Player of the match: Sedezhalie Rupero (Nagaland)

02 December 2025	Mizoram; 186/9 (20 overs)	v	Arunchal Pradesh; 128/7 (20 overs)	Mizoram won by 58 runs
11:00; Scorecard	Mizoram; 186/9 (20 overs)	v	Arunchal Pradesh; 128/7 (20 overs)	Deccan Gymkhana Cricket Ground, Pune; Umpires: Pranav Joshi and S Nishaanth; Player of the match: Khiangte Vanrotlinga (Mizoram)
11:00; Scorecard	Khiangte Vanrotlinga 42 (19); TNR Mohith 3/32 (4 overs)		Yash Arora 25 (33); B Lalnunfela 2/19 (4 overs)	Deccan Gymkhana Cricket Ground, Pune; Umpires: Pranav Joshi and S Nishaanth; Player of the match: Khiangte Vanrotlinga (Mizoram)
Mizoram won the toss and elected to bat; Points: Mizoram 4, Arunachal Pradesh 0				Deccan Gymkhana Cricket Ground, Pune; Umpires: Pranav Joshi and S Nishaanth; Player of the match: Khiangte Vanrotlinga (Mizoram)

02 December 2025	Manipur; 134 (19.5 overs)	v	Sikkim; 138/2 (15.2 overs)	Sikkim won by 8 wickets
16:30 (D/N); Scorecard	Manipur; 134 (19.5 overs)	v	Sikkim; 138/2 (15.2 overs)	MCA Cricket Stadium, Gahunje, Pune; Umpires: Chirra Ravikanthreddy and K Nidhin; Player of the match: Kranthi Kumar (Sikkim)
16:30 (D/N); Scorecard	Johnson Singh 39 (37); Ankur Malik 3/18 (4 overs)		Kranthi Kumar 79* (45); Pheiroijam Jotin 1/27 (4 overs)	MCA Cricket Stadium, Gahunje, Pune; Umpires: Chirra Ravikanthreddy and K Nidhin; Player of the match: Kranthi Kumar (Sikkim)
Manipur won the toss and elected to bat; Points: Sikkim 4, Manipur 0				MCA Cricket Stadium, Gahunje, Pune; Umpires: Chirra Ravikanthreddy and K Nidhin; Player of the match: Kranthi Kumar (Sikkim)

==== Round 5 ====
04 December 2025	Arunchal Pradesh; 90/9 (20 overs)	v	Sikkim; 93/1 (9.3 overs)	Sikkim won by 9 wickets
11:00; Scorecard	Arunchal Pradesh; 90/9 (20 overs)	v	Sikkim; 93/1 (9.3 overs)	MCA Cricket Stadium, Gahunje, Pune; Umpires: S Nishaanth and K Nidhin; Player of the match: Amit Rajera (Sikkim)
11:00; Scorecard	Techi Neri 33 (37); Ankur Malik 2/8 (3 overs)		Amit Rajera 42* (28); TNR Mohith 1/29 (4 overs)	MCA Cricket Stadium, Gahunje, Pune; Umpires: S Nishaanth and K Nidhin; Player of the match: Amit Rajera (Sikkim)
Arunachal Pradesh won the toss and elected to bat; Points: Sikkim 4, Arunachal Pradesh 0				MCA Cricket Stadium, Gahunje, Pune; Umpires: S Nishaanth and K Nidhin; Player of the match: Amit Rajera (Sikkim)

04 December 2025	Nagaland; 220/6 (20 overs)	v	Manipur; 188 (18.1 overs)	Nagaland won by 32 runs
11:00; Scorecard	Nagaland; 220/6 (20 overs)	v	Manipur; 188 (18.1 overs)	Deccan Gymkhana Cricket Ground, Pune; Umpires: Pranav Joshi and Chirra Ravikanthreddy; Player of the match: Dega Nischal (Nagaland)
11:00; Scorecard	Dega Nischal 108 (49); Bishworjit Konthoujam 2/22 (4 overs)		Kangabam Priyojit 66 (32); Rongsen Jonathan 3/39 (4 overs)	Deccan Gymkhana Cricket Ground, Pune; Umpires: Pranav Joshi and Chirra Ravikanthreddy; Player of the match: Dega Nischal (Nagaland)
Nagaland won the toss and elected to bat; Points: Nagaland 4, Manipur 0				Deccan Gymkhana Cricket Ground, Pune; Umpires: Pranav Joshi and Chirra Ravikanthreddy; Player of the match: Dega Nischal (Nagaland)

04 December 2025	Meghalaya; 150/8 (20 overs)	v	Mizoram; 151/2 (17.5 overs)	Mizoram won by 8 wickets
16:30 (D/N); Scorecard	Meghalaya; 150/8 (20 overs)	v	Mizoram; 151/2 (17.5 overs)	MCA Cricket Stadium, Gahunje, Pune; Umpires: S Nishaanth and K Nidhin; Player of the match: Jehu Anderson (Mizoram)
16:30 (D/N); Scorecard	Akash Choudhary 28 (12); B Lalnunfela 4/25 (4 overs)		Jehu Anderson 82* (55); Swarajeet Das 1/26 (2.5)	MCA Cricket Stadium, Gahunje, Pune; Umpires: S Nishaanth and K Nidhin; Player of the match: Jehu Anderson (Mizoram)
Meghalaya won the toss and elected to bat; Points: Mizoram 4, Meghalaya 0				MCA Cricket Stadium, Gahunje, Pune; Umpires: S Nishaanth and K Nidhin; Player of the match: Jehu Anderson (Mizoram)

==== Plate Final ====
06 December 2025	Mizoram; 148/9 (20 overs)	v	Sikkim; 138/7 (20 overs)	Mizoram won by 10 runs
16:30 (D/N) Plate Final Scorecard	Mizoram; 148/9 (20 overs)	v	Sikkim; 138/7 (20 overs)	MCA Cricket Stadium, Gahunje, Pune; Umpires: S Nishaanth and Pranav Joshi; Player of the match: KC Cariappa (Mizoram)
16:30 (D/N) Plate Final Scorecard	KC Cariappa 52 (18); Palzor Tamang 3/15 (4 overs)		K Sai Satwik 38 (40); Codanda Ajit Karthik 2/28 (4 overs)	MCA Cricket Stadium, Gahunje, Pune; Umpires: S Nishaanth and Pranav Joshi; Player of the match: KC Cariappa (Mizoram)
Sikkim won the toss and elected to field; Mizoram promoted to elite category for 2026-27 Syed Mushtaq Ali Trophy				MCA Cricket Stadium, Gahunje, Pune; Umpires: S Nishaanth and Pranav Joshi; Player of the match: KC Cariappa (Mizoram)

== Super League ==
=== Super League Group A ===
==== Round 1 ====
12 December 2025	Rajasthan; 132/8 (20 overs)	v	Haryana; 133/3 (16.2 overs)	Haryana won by 7 wickets
11:00 (D/N); Scorecard	Rajasthan; 132/8 (20 overs)	v	Haryana; 133/3 (16.2 overs)	MCA Cricket Stadium, Gahunje, Pune; Umpires: Saidharshan Kumar and Amit Rana; Player of the match: Ishant Bhardwaj (Haryana)
11:00 (D/N); Scorecard	Mahipal Lomror 37* (39); Anshul Kamboj 2/24 (4 overs)		Ankit Kumar 60 (41); Rahul Chahar 1/17 (4 overs)	MCA Cricket Stadium, Gahunje, Pune; Umpires: Saidharshan Kumar and Amit Rana; Player of the match: Ishant Bhardwaj (Haryana)
Haryana won the toss and elected to field; Points: Haryana 4, Rajasthan 0				MCA Cricket Stadium, Gahunje, Pune; Umpires: Saidharshan Kumar and Amit Rana; Player of the match: Ishant Bhardwaj (Haryana)

12 December 2025	Mumbai; 131 (18.5 overs)	v	Hyderabad; 132/1 (11.5 overs)	Hyderabad won by 9 wickets
16:30; Scorecard	Mumbai; 131 (18.5 overs)	v	Hyderabad; 132/1 (11.5 overs)	MCA Cricket Stadium, Gahunje, Pune; Umpires: Amit Rana and Kannur Swaroopanand; Player of the match: Mohammed Siraj (Hyderabad)
16:30; Scorecard	Yashasvi Jaiswal 29 (20); Mohammed Siraj 3/17 (3.5 overs)		Tanmay Agarwal 75* (40); Tushar Deshpande 1/16 (1.5 overs)	MCA Cricket Stadium, Gahunje, Pune; Umpires: Amit Rana and Kannur Swaroopanand; Player of the match: Mohammed Siraj (Hyderabad)
Hyderabad won the toss and elected to field.; Points: Hyderabad 4, Mumbai 0				MCA Cricket Stadium, Gahunje, Pune; Umpires: Amit Rana and Kannur Swaroopanand; Player of the match: Mohammed Siraj (Hyderabad)

==== Round 2 ====
14 December 2025	Haryana; 234/3 (20 overs)	v	Mumbai; 238/6 (17.3 overs)	Mumbai won by 4 wickets
09:00; Scorecard	Haryana; 234/3 (20 overs)	v	Mumbai; 238/6 (17.3 overs)	D Y Patil Academy, Ambi, Pune; Umpires: Saidharshan Kumar and Tony Ematty; Player of the match: Yashasvi Jaiswal (Mumbai)
09:00; Scorecard	Ankit Kumar 89 (42); Sairaj Patil 2/44 (4 overs)		Yashasvi Jaiswal 101 (50); Samant Jakhar 2/42 (3.3 overs)	D Y Patil Academy, Ambi, Pune; Umpires: Saidharshan Kumar and Tony Ematty; Player of the match: Yashasvi Jaiswal (Mumbai)
Mumbai won the toss and elected to field.; Points: Mumbai 4, Haryana 0				D Y Patil Academy, Ambi, Pune; Umpires: Saidharshan Kumar and Tony Ematty; Player of the match: Yashasvi Jaiswal (Mumbai)

14 December 2025	Rajasthan; 178/9 (20 overs)	v	Hyderabad; 179/4 (17.1 overs)	Hyderabad won by 6 wickets
13:30; Scorecard	Rajasthan; 178/9 (20 overs)	v	Hyderabad; 179/4 (17.1 overs)	D Y Patil Academy, Ambi, Pune; Umpires: Tony Ematty and Keyur Kelkar; Player of the match: Tanmay Agarwal (Hyderabad)
13:30; Scorecard	Mahipal Lomror 48 (35); Chama Milind 3/25 (3 overs)		Tanmay Agarwal 73 (41); Manav Suthar 2/20 (2 overs)	D Y Patil Academy, Ambi, Pune; Umpires: Tony Ematty and Keyur Kelkar; Player of the match: Tanmay Agarwal (Hyderabad)
Hyderabad won the toss and elected to field.; Points: Hyderabad 4, Rajasthan 0				D Y Patil Academy, Ambi, Pune; Umpires: Tony Ematty and Keyur Kelkar; Player of the match: Tanmay Agarwal (Hyderabad)

==== Round 3 ====
16 December 2025	Rajasthan; 216/4 (20 overs)	v	Mumbai; 217/7 (18.1 overs)	Mumbai won by 3 wickets
11:00; Scorecard	Rajasthan; 216/4 (20 overs)	v	Mumbai; 217/7 (18.1 overs)	MCA Cricket Stadium, Gahunje, Pune; Umpires: Tony Ematty and Saidharshan Kumar; Player of the match: Sarfaraz Khan (Mumbai)
11:00; Scorecard	Mukul Choudhary 54* (28); Sairaj Patil 1/31 (4 overs)		Sarfaraz Khan 73 (22); Manav Suthar 3/23 (4 overs)	MCA Cricket Stadium, Gahunje, Pune; Umpires: Tony Ematty and Saidharshan Kumar; Player of the match: Sarfaraz Khan (Mumbai)
Mumbai won the toss and elected to field.; Points: Mumbai 4, Rajasthan 0				MCA Cricket Stadium, Gahunje, Pune; Umpires: Tony Ematty and Saidharshan Kumar; Player of the match: Sarfaraz Khan (Mumbai)

16 December 2025	Haryana; 246/7 (20 overs)	v	Hyderabad; 122 (16.1 overs)	Haryana won by 124 runs
16:30 (D/N); Scorecard	Haryana; 246/7 (20 overs)	v	Hyderabad; 122 (16.1 overs)	MCA Cricket Stadium, Gahunje, Pune; Umpires: Tony Ematty and Kannur Swaroopanand; Player of the match: Samant Jakhar (Haryana)
16:30 (D/N); Scorecard	Samant Jakhar 60 (22); Tanay Thyagarajan 2/43 (4 overs)		Rahul Buddhi 37 (24); Amit Rana 3/14 (3 overs)	MCA Cricket Stadium, Gahunje, Pune; Umpires: Tony Ematty and Kannur Swaroopanand; Player of the match: Samant Jakhar (Haryana)
Hyderabad won the toss and elected to field.; Points: Haryana 4, Hyderabad 0				MCA Cricket Stadium, Gahunje, Pune; Umpires: Tony Ematty and Kannur Swaroopanand; Player of the match: Samant Jakhar (Haryana)

=== Super League Group B ===
==== Round 1 ====
12 December 2025	Andhra; 112 (19.1 overs)	v	Madhya Pradesh; 113/6 (17.3 overs)	Madhya Pradesh won by 4 wickets
09:00; Scorecard	Andhra; 112 (19.1 overs)	v	Madhya Pradesh; 113/6 (17.3 overs)	D Y Patil Academy, Ambi, Pune; Umpires: Keyur Kelkar and Tony Ematty; Player of the match: Shivam Shukla (Madhya Pradesh)
09:00; Scorecard	Srikar Bharat 39 (31); Shivam Shukla 4/23 (4 overs)		Rishabh Chouhan 47 (43); Nitish Kumar Reddy 3/17 (3 overs)	D Y Patil Academy, Ambi, Pune; Umpires: Keyur Kelkar and Tony Ematty; Player of the match: Shivam Shukla (Madhya Pradesh)
Madhya Pradesh won the toss and elected to field.; Points: Madhya Pradesh 4, Andhra 0				D Y Patil Academy, Ambi, Pune; Umpires: Keyur Kelkar and Tony Ematty; Player of the match: Shivam Shukla (Madhya Pradesh)

12 December 2025	Punjab; 235/6 (20 overs)	v	Jharkhand; 237/4 (18.1 overs)	Jharkhand won by 6 wickets
13:30; Scorecard	Punjab; 235/6 (20 overs)	v	Jharkhand; 237/4 (18.1 overs)	D Y Patil Academy, Ambi, Pune; Umpires: Keyur Kelkar and Tony Ematty; Player of the match: Kumar Kushagra (Jharkhand)
13:30; Scorecard	Salil Arora 125* (45); Sushant Mishra 2/47 (4 overs)		Kumar Kushagra 86* (42); Ramandeep Singh 1/37 (3 overs)	D Y Patil Academy, Ambi, Pune; Umpires: Keyur Kelkar and Tony Ematty; Player of the match: Kumar Kushagra (Jharkhand)
Jharkhand won the toss and elected to field.; Points: Jharkhand 4, Punjab 0				D Y Patil Academy, Ambi, Pune; Umpires: Keyur Kelkar and Tony Ematty; Player of the match: Kumar Kushagra (Jharkhand)

==== Round 2 ====
14 December 2025	Punjab; 205/5 (20 overs)	v	Andhra; 211/5 (19.5 overs)	Andhra won by 5 wickets
11:00; Scorecard	Punjab; 205/5 (20 overs)	v	Andhra; 211/5 (19.5 overs)	MCA Cricket Stadium, Gahunje, Pune; Umpires: Mohit Krishnadas and Amit Rana; Player of the match: M. Hemanth Reddy (Andhra)
11:00; Scorecard	Anmolpreet Singh 47 (27); Saurabh Kumar 1/24 (4 overs)		M. Hemanth Reddy 109* (53); Gurnoor Brar 3/23 (4 overs)	MCA Cricket Stadium, Gahunje, Pune; Umpires: Mohit Krishnadas and Amit Rana; Player of the match: M. Hemanth Reddy (Andhra)
Andhra won the toss and elected to field.; Points: Andhra 4, Punjab 0				MCA Cricket Stadium, Gahunje, Pune; Umpires: Mohit Krishnadas and Amit Rana; Player of the match: M. Hemanth Reddy (Andhra)

14 December 2025	Jharkhand; 181/9 (20 overs)	v	Madhya Pradesh; 180/4 (20 overs)	Jharkhand won by 1 run
16:30 (D/N); Scorecard	Jharkhand; 181/9 (20 overs)	v	Madhya Pradesh; 180/4 (20 overs)	MCA Cricket Stadium, Gahunje, Pune; Umpires: Amit Rana and Kannur Swaroopanand; Player of the match: Ishan Kishan (Jharkhand)
16:30 (D/N); Scorecard	Ishan Kishan 63 (30); Venkatesh Iyer 3/17 (3 overs)		Harpreet Singh Bhatia 77* (48); Bal Krishna 1/34 (4 overs)	MCA Cricket Stadium, Gahunje, Pune; Umpires: Amit Rana and Kannur Swaroopanand; Player of the match: Ishan Kishan (Jharkhand)
Madhya Pradesh won the toss and elected to field.; Mangesh Yadav (Madhya Pradesh) made his T20 debut.; Points: Jharkhand 4, Madhya Pradesh 0				MCA Cricket Stadium, Gahunje, Pune; Umpires: Amit Rana and Kannur Swaroopanand; Player of the match: Ishan Kishan (Jharkhand)

==== Round 3 ====
16 December 2025	Madhya Pradesh; 225/8 (20 overs)	v	Punjab; 226/8 (19.1 overs)	Punjab won by 2 wickets
09:00; Scorecard	Madhya Pradesh; 225/8 (20 overs)	v	Punjab; 226/8 (19.1 overs)	D Y Patil Academy, Ambi, Pune; Umpires: Mohit Krishnadas and Amit Rana; Player of the match: Ramandeep Singh (Punjab)
09:00; Scorecard	Venkatesh Iyer 70 (43); Gurnoor Brar 3/45 (4 overs)		Harnoor Singh 64 (36); Shivam Shukla 3/39 (3.1 overs)	D Y Patil Academy, Ambi, Pune; Umpires: Mohit Krishnadas and Amit Rana; Player of the match: Ramandeep Singh (Punjab)
Punjab won the toss and elected to field.; Points: Punjab 4, Madhya Pradesh 0				D Y Patil Academy, Ambi, Pune; Umpires: Mohit Krishnadas and Amit Rana; Player of the match: Ramandeep Singh (Punjab)

16 December 2025	Andhra; 203/7 (20 overs)	v	Jharkhand; 194/8 (20 overs)	Andhra won by 9 runs
13:30; Scorecard	Andhra; 203/7 (20 overs)	v	Jharkhand; 194/8 (20 overs)	D Y Patil Academy, Ambi, Pune; Umpires: Keyur Kelkar and Amit Rana; Player of the match: Nitish Kumar Reddy (Andhra)
13:30; Scorecard	Nitish Kumar Reddy 45 (22); Anukul Roy 2/30 (4 overs)		Virat Singh 77 (40); Saurabh Kumar 2/21 (3 overs)	D Y Patil Academy, Ambi, Pune; Umpires: Keyur Kelkar and Amit Rana; Player of the match: Nitish Kumar Reddy (Andhra)
Jharkhand won the toss and elected to field.; Points: Andhra 4, Jharkhand 0				D Y Patil Academy, Ambi, Pune; Umpires: Keyur Kelkar and Amit Rana; Player of the match: Nitish Kumar Reddy (Andhra)

== Final ==
18 December 2025
16:30 (D/N)
Scorecard

Jharkhand; 262/3 (20 overs)	v	Haryana; 193 (18.3 overs)
Ishan Kishan 101 (49); Sumit Kumar 1/41 (4 overs)		Yashvardhan Dalal 53 (22); Sushant Mishra 3/27 (4 overs)

Jharkhand won by 69 runs
MCA Cricket Stadium, Gahunje, Pune
Umpires: Saidharshan Kumar and Kannur Swaroopanand
Player of the match: Ishan Kishan (Jharkhand)

- Haryana won the toss and elected to field.

== Statistics ==
=== Individual statistics ===
==== Most Runs ====
Runs	Batter	Mat	Inns	NO	Average	SR	HS	100s	50s	4s	6s
517	Ishan Kishan (Jharkhand)	10	10	1	57.44	197.32	113*	2	2	51	33
448	Ankit Kumar (Haryana)	11	11	1	44.80	172.30	89	-	5	49	22
422	Kumar Kushagra (Jharkhand)	10	10	3	60.28	161.68	86*	-	4	34	22
398	Yashvardhan Dalal (Haryana)	11	10	2	49.75	148.50	76*	-	5	32	19
395	Ajinkya Rahane (Mumbai)	10	10	2	48.87	161.57	95*	-	3	37	16
Source: ESPNcricinfo | *=not out | Last updated: 18 December 2025

==== Most Wickets ====
Wkts	Bowler	Mat	Inns	Overs	Runs	BBI	Ave	Econ	SR	4WI	5WI
22	Ashok Sharma (Rajasthan)	10	10	37.1	344	4/16	15.63	9.25	10.13	2	-
22	Sushant Mishra (Jharkhand)	11	11	42.2	378	3/21	17.18	8.92	11.54	-	-
21	Anshul Kamboj (Haryana)	11	11	43.1	371	4/23	17.66	8.59	12.33	1	-
18	Yash Thakur (Vidarbha)	7	7	26.1	178	5/16	9.88	6.80	8.72	1	1
18	Anukul Roy (Jharkhand)	11	11	37.2	277	3/20	15.38	7.41	12.44	-	-
Source: ESPNcricinfo | Last updated: 18 December 2025

==== Most dismissals for a wicket-keeper ====
Dismissals	Player	Mat	Inns	Ct	St	Max dis	Dis/Inn
16	Pragnay Reddy (Hyderabad)	10	10	11	5	5 (3ct 2st)	1.600
12	Ishan Kishan (Jharkhand)	10	10	12	0	4 (4ct 0st)	1.200
12	Prabhsimran Singh (Punjab)	10	10	11	1	3 (3ct 0st)	1.200
10	Aryan Juyal (Uttar Pradesh)	7	7	6	4	3 (3ct 0st)	1.428
9	Urvil Patel (Gujarat)	7	7	8	1	2 (2ct 0st)	1.285
Source: ESPNcricinfo | Last updated: 18 December 2025

==== Most catches for a player ====
Catches	Player	Mat	Inns	Max	Ct/Inn
12	Tripuresh Singh (Madhya Pradesh)	10	10	2	1.200
11	Pradipta Pramanik (Bengal)	7	7	4	1.571
9	Kumar Kushagra (Jharkhand)	10	9	3	1.000
9	Anukul Roy (Jharkhand)	11	11	2	0.818
9	Sumit Kumar (Haryana)	11	11	3	0.818
Source: ESPNcricinfo | Last updated: 18 December 2025

==== Highest Individual Score ====
Runs	Batter	Balls	4s	6s	SR	Opposition	Venue	Match date
148	Abhishek Sharma (Punjab)	52	8	16	284.61	Bengal	Gymkhana Ground, Hyderabad	30 November 2025
130*	Abhimanyu Easwaran (Bengal)	66	13	8	196.96	Punjab	Gymkhana Ground, Hyderabad	30 November 2025
125*	Salil Arora (Punjab)	45	9	11	277.77	Jharkhand	D Y Patil Academy, Ambi, Pune	12 December 2025
121*	Rohan Kunnummal (Kerala)	60	10	10	201.66	Odisha	Bharat Ratna Shri Atal Bihari Vajpayee Ekana Cricket Stadium B, Lucknow	26 November 2025
119*	Urvil Patel (Gujarat)	37	12	10	321.62	Services	Gymkhana Ground, Hyderabad	26 November 2025
Source: ESPNcricinfo | *=not out | Last updated: 12 December 2025

==== Best bowling figures in an innings ====
Figures	Bowler	Overs	Maidens	Econ	Opposition	Venue	Match date
6/9	Arshad Khan (Madhya Pradesh)	4	1	2.25	Chandigarh	JU Second Campus, Salt Lake, Kolkata	06 December 2025
6/20	Mukhtar Hussain (Assam)	4	0	5	Chhattisgarh	Bharat Ratna Shri Atal Bihari Vajpayee Ekana Cricket Stadium, Lucknow	28 November 2025
5/16	Yash Thakur (Vidarbha)	3.2	0	4.8	Kerala	Bharat Ratna Shri Atal Bihari Vajpayee Ekana Cricket Stadium, Lucknow	02 December 2025
5/21	Rajesh Mohanty (Odisha)	4	0	5.25	Chhattisgarh	Bharat Ratna Shri Atal Bihari Vajpayee Ekana Cricket Stadium B, Lucknow	02 December 2025
5/23	Shardul Thakur (Mumbai)	3	0	7.66	Assam	Bharat Ratna Shri Atal Bihari Vajpayee Ekana Cricket Stadium B, Lucknow	02 December 2025
Source: ESPNcricinfo | Last updated: 12 December 2025

=== Team statistics ===
==== Highest team totals ====
Score	Team	Overs	RR	Inns	Opposition	Venue	Date
310/5	Punjab	20	15.5	1	Bengal	Gymkhana Ground, Hyderabad	30 November 2025
262/3	Jharkhand	20	13.10	1	Haryana	MCA Cricket Stadium, Gahunje, Pune	18 December 2025
246/7	Haryana	20	12.30	1	Hyderabad	MCA Cricket Stadium, Gahunje, Pune	16 December 2025
245/3	Karnataka	20	12.25	1	Tamil Nadu	Narendra Modi Stadium Ground ‘B’, Motera, Ahmedabad	02 December 2025
238/6	Mumbai	17.3	13.60	2	Haryana	D Y Patil Academy, Ambi, Pune	14 December 2025
Source: ESPNcricinfo | Last updated: 18 December 2025

==== Lowest team totals ====
Score	Team	Overs	RR	Inns	Opposition	Venue	Date
73	Gujarat	14.1	5.15	1	Baroda	Rajiv Gandhi International Stadium, Hyderabad	04 December 2025
81	Meghalaya	16	5.06	2	Nagaland	MCA Cricket Stadium, Gahunje, Pune	02 December 2025
83	Pondicherry	13.1	6.3	1	Gujarat	Gymkhana Ground, Hyderabad	02 December 2025
84	Jammu & Kashmir	15.3	5.41	2	Uttar Pradesh	JU Second Campus, Salt Lake, Kolkata	28 November 2025
90/9	Arunachal Pradesh	20	4.50	1	Sikkim	MCA Cricket Stadium, Gahunje, Pune	04 December 2025
Source: ESPNcricinfo | Last updated: 12 December 2025

=== Partnership statistics ===
==== Highest partnership by wicket ====
Wkt	Runs	Batters		Team	Opposition	Ground	Match date
1st	205	Prabhsimran Singh	Abhishek Sharma	Punjab	Bengal	Gymkhana Ground, Hyderabad	30 November 2025
2nd	177	Ishan Kishan	Kumar Kushagra	Jharkhand	Haryana	MCA Cricket Stadium, Gahunje, Pune	18 December 2025
3rd	165	Aanjaneya Suryavanshi	Kunal Chandela	Uttarakhand	Saurashtra	Narendra Modi Stadium Ground ‘B’, Motera, Ahmedabad	28 November 2025
4th	161*	Kangabam Priyojit	Langlonyamba Keishangbam	Manipur	Arunachal Pradesh	Deccan Gymkhana Cricket Ground, Pune	26 November 2025
5th	119	Sai Kishore	Narayan Jagadeesan	Tamil Nadu	Tripura	Narendra Modi Stadium Ground ‘A’, Motera, Ahmedabad	4 December 2025
6th	155*	M Hemanth Reddy	SDNV Prasad	Andhra Pradesh	Punjab	MCA Cricket Stadium, Gahunje, Pune	14 December 2025
7th	108*	Joseph Lalthankhuma	KC Cariappa	Mizoram	Sikkim	Deccan Gymkhana Cricket Ground, Pune	28 November 2025
8th	92	Sidak Singh	Adil Ayub Tunda	Puducherry	Punjab	Rajiv Gandhi International Stadium, Hyderabad	4 December 2025
9th	45	Sumit Lama	KC Cariappa	Mizoram	Sikkim	MCA Cricket Stadium, Gahunje, Pune	6 December 2025
10th	46*	Mohammed Shami	Abhimanyu Easwaran	Bengal	Punjab	Gymkhana Ground, Hyderabad	30 November 2025
Source: ESPNcricinfo | *=not out | Last updated: 18 December 2025

==== Highest partnership by runs ====
Runs	Batters		Wkt	Team	Opposition	Venue	Match date
205	Prabhsimran Singh	Abhishek Sharma	1st	Punjab	Bengal	Gymkhana Ground, Hyderabad	30 November 2025
177*	Sanju Samson	Rohan Kunnummal	1st	Kerala	Odisha	Bharat Ratna Shri Atal Bihari Vajpayee Ekana Cricket Stadium B, Lucknow	26 November 2025
177	Ishan Kishan	Kumar Kushagra	2nd	Jharkhand	Haryana	MCA Cricket Stadium, Gahunje, Pune	18 December2025
174	Urvil Patel	Aarya Desai	1st	Gujarat	Services	Gymkhana Ground, Hyderabad	26 November 2025
165	Aanjaneya Suryavanshi	Kunal Chandela	3rd	Uttarakhand	Saurashtra	Narendra Modi Stadium Ground 'B', Ahmedabad	28 November 2025
Source: ESPNcricinfo | *=not out | Last updated: 18 December 2025
