= 2022–23 Ranji Trophy Group A =

Cricket tournament

- Dates: 13 December 2022 – 10 February 2023
- Administrator(s): BCCI
- Cricket format: First-class cricket
- Tournament format(s): Round-robin then knockout
- Participants: 8

The 2022–23 Ranji Trophy is the 88th season of the Ranji Trophy, the premier first-class cricket tournament in India. It is contested by 38 teams, divided into four elite groups and a plate group, with eight teams in Group A. The tournament was announced by the Board of Control for Cricket in India (BCCI) on 8 August 2022.

== Points table ==
Pos	Team	Pld	W	L	T	D	NR	Pts	Quot
1	Bengal	7	4	1	0	2	0	32	1.573
2	Uttarakhand	7	3	0	0	4	0	29	1.365
3	Himachal Pradesh	7	2	1	0	4	0	21	1.459
4	Baroda	7	2	1	0	4	0	21	1.324
5	Odisha	7	1	2	0	4	0	14	0.846
6	Uttar Pradesh	7	1	2	0	4	0	13	0.980
7	Haryana	7	1	2	0	4	0	13	0.855
8	Nagaland	7	0	5	0	2	0	2	0.297

Updated to match(es) played on 27 January 2023. Source: ESPN Cricinfo

Advances to Quarter-final Relegated to Plate Group for next season

== Fixtures ==
=== Round 1 ===
13–16 December 2022
Scorecard

Uttarakhand	v	Nagaland
282 (78 overs); Kunal Chandela 92 (129); Akash Singh 3/45 (19 overs)		389 (154.1 overs); Shrikant Mundhe 161 (368); Swapnil Singh 5/47 (32.1 overs)
306/7d (70 overs); Swapnil Singh 88* (106); Akash Singh 3/66 (17 overs)		25 (18 overs); Nagaho Chishi 10 (6); Mayank Mishra 5/4 (9 overs)

Uttarakhand won by 174 runs
Nagaland Cricket Association Stadium, Sovima
Umpires: Parashar Joshi and Sundaram Ravi
Player of the match: Swapnil Singh (Uttarakhand)

- Uttarakhand won the toss and elected to bat.
- Akhil Rawat (Uttarakhand), Akash Singh, Hem Chetri, Joshua Ozukum and Mungkham Phom (Nagaland) all made their first-class debuts.

13–16 December 2022
Scorecard

Odisha	v	Baroda
457 (154.2 overs); Debabrata Pradhan 89 (147); Ninad Rathva 5/106 (39.2 overs)		624/8 (172.4 overs); Shashwat Rawat 135 (198); Basant Mohanty 2/31 (15.4 overs)

Match Drawn
Vikas Cricket Ground, Cuttack
Umpires: Abhijit Deshmukh and Mohamad Rafi
Player of the match: Shashwat Rawat (Baroda)

- Baroda won the toss and elected to field.
- Kartik Biswal (Odisha), Akshay More, Priyanshu Moliya and Shashwat Rawat (Baroda) all made their first-class debuts.

13–16 December 2022
Scorecard

Uttar Pradesh	v	Bengal
198 (63.5 overs); Rinku Singh 79 (118); Ishan Porel 5/35 (17 overs)		169 (43.3 overs); Akash Deep 41 (30); Shivam Mavi 6/55 (18.3 overs)
227 (65.3 overs); Rinku Singh 89 (113); Akash Deep 3/52 (19.3 overs)		259/4 (74.5 overs); Anustup Majumdar 83 (170); Shivam Mavi 2/65 (19 overs)

Bengal won by 6 wickets
Eden Gardens, Kolkata
Umpires: Anil Dandekar and Navdeep Singh
Player of the match: Ishan Porel (Bengal)

- Bengal won the toss and elected to field.
- Aanjaneya Suryavanshi and Aaradhya Yadav (Uttar Pradesh) both made their first-class debuts.

13–16 December 2022
Scorecard

Haryana	v	Himachal Pradesh
46 (20.4 overs); Nishant Sindhu 19 (29); Vaibhav Arora 4/15 (7 overs)		487/4d (130.2 overs); Raghav Dhawan 182 (359); Chaitanya Bishnoi 2/15 (5.2 overs)
353 (123 overs); Chaitanya Bishnoi 97 (192); Rishi Dhawan 3/83 (28 overs)

Himachal Pradesh won by an innings and 88 runs
Chaudhary Bansi Lal Cricket Stadium, Rohtak
Umpires: Nikhil Patwardhan and Sanjay Kumar Singh
Player of the match: Raghav Dhawan (Himachal Pradesh)

- Haryana won the toss and elected to bat.
- Nitesh Satyawan (Haryana) made his first-class debut.

=== Round 2 ===
20–22 December 2022
Scorecard

Uttar Pradesh	v	Nagaland
551/4d (117 overs); Dhruv Jurel 249 (329); Rongsen Jonathan 3/168 (42 overs)		136 (42.4 overs); Imliwati Lemtur 36 (72); Shivam Sharma 7/59 (16.4 overs)
		185 (55.4 overs) (f/o); Shrikant Mundhe 98 (193); Shivam Mavi 3/26 (9 overs)

Uttar Pradesh won by an innings and 230 runs
Nagaland Cricket Association Stadium, Sovima
Umpires: Saiyed Khalid and Mohamad Rafi
Player of the match: Dhruv Jurel (Uttar Pradesh)

- Nagaland won the toss and elected to field.
- Kartikeya Jaiswal (Uttar Pradesh) made his first-class debut.

20–23 December 2022
Scorecard

Bengal	v	Himachal Pradesh
310 (78.2 overs); Anustup Majumdar 159 (207); Sidharth Sharma 5/69 (19 overs)		130 (46.5 overs); Prashant Chopra 71 (149); Shahbaz Ahmed 5/32 (13 overs)
291/5d (74 overs); Sudip Kumar Gharami 101 (166); Sidharth Sharma 2/53 (16 overs)		348/4 (93 overs); Prashant Chopra 109 (205); Sayan Mondal 2/29 (9 overs)

Match drawn
Eden Gardens, Kolkata
Umpires: Ulhas Gandhe and Vinod Seshan
Player of the match: Anustup Majumdar (Bengal)

- Himachal Pradesh won the toss and elected to field.
- Ravikant Singh (Bengal) made his first-class debut.
- Substitute: Ekant Sen for Amit Kumar (Himachal Pradesh).

20–23 December 2022
Scorecard

Odisha	v	Uttarakhand
213 (76.1 overs); Kartik Biswal 48 (75); Swapnil Singh 4/48 (15 overs)		477 (143 overs); Jiwanjot Singh 218 (363); Suryakant Pradhan 3/90 (34 overs)
165 (57.5 overs); Anurag Sarangi 93 (158); Abhay Negi 5/33 (10.5 overs)

Uttarakhand won by an innings and 99 runs
Abhimanyu Cricket Academy, Dehradun
Umpires: Belur Ravi and Sundaram Ravi
Player of the match: Jiwanjot Singh (Uttarakhand)

- Uttarakhand won the toss and elected to field.
- Saurabh Kanojia (Odisha) made his first-class debut.

20–23 December 2022
Scorecard

Baroda	v	Haryana
615 (158 overs); Jyotsnil Singh 195 (261); Nishant Sindhu 3/57 (13 overs)		278 (66.2 overs); Nishant Sindhu 110 (100); Ninad Rathva 3/36 (7 overs)
		404/9 (137.3 overs) (f/o); Yuvraj Singh 94 (283); Jyotsnil Singh 3/50 (11 overs)

Match drawn
Gujarat State Fertilizer Corporation Ground, Vadodara
Umpires: Pashchim Pathak and Kamlesh Sharma
Player of the match: Jyotsnil Singh (Baroda)

- Haryana won the toss and elected to field.

=== Round 3 ===
27–29 December 2022
Scorecard

Nagaland	v	Bengal
166 (62.4 overs); Chetan Bist 64 (154); Pradipta Pramanik 6/43 (24.4 overs)		450/4d (96 overs); Abhimanyu Easwaran 170 (218); Rongsen Jonathan 2/79 (17 overs)
123 (45.3 overs); Shrikant Mundhe 28 (81); Karan Lal 5/47 (17 overs)

Bengal won by an innings and 161 runs
Nagaland Cricket Association Stadium, Sovima
Umpires: Krishnamachari Bharatan and Ganesh Charhate
Player of the match: Pradipta Pramanik (Bengal)

- Nagaland won the toss and elected to bat.
- Karan Lal (Bengal) made his first-class debut.

27–30 December 2022
Scorecard

Haryana	v	Odisha
338 (100 overs); Nishant Sindhu 142 (215); Suryakant Pradhan 6/93 (25 overs)		414 (128.5 overs); Kartik Biswal 101 (177); Yuzvendra Chahal 3/107 (33 overs)
384/4d (77 overs); Ankit Kumar 172* (243); Jayanta Behera 2/134 (27 overs)		110/1 (31 overs); Anurag Sarangi 53* (96); Jayant Yadav 1/20 (8 overs)

Match drawn
DRIEMS Ground, Cuttack
Umpires: Rohan Pandit and GS Ananth Ramakrishnan
Player of the match: Suryakant Pradhan (Odisha)

- Odisha won the toss and elected to field.
- Tarani Sa, Swastik Samal and Prayash Singh (Odisha) all made their first-class debuts.

27–30 December 2022
Scorecard

Himachal Pradesh	v	Uttarakhand
49 (16.3 overs); Ankit Kalsi 26 (42); Deepak Dhapola 8/35 (8.3 overs)		336 (75.4 overs); Aditya Tare 92 (129); Vaibhav Arora 4/80 (18.4 overs)
391 (111 overs); Akash Vasisht 111 (196); Abhay Negi 4/54 (11 overs)		106/5 (28.5 overs); Kunal Chandela 59* (81); Mayank Dagar 3/35 (14 overs)

Uttarakhand won by 5 wickets
Abhimanyu Cricket Academy, Dehradun
Umpires: VM Dhokre and Nitin Menon
Player of the match: Deepak Dhapola (Uttarakhand)

- Himachal Pradesh won the toss and elected to bat.
- Aryan Sharma (Uttarakhand) made his first-class debut.

27–30 December 2022
Scorecard

Uttar Pradesh	v	Baroda
258 (100.5 overs); Akshdeep Nath 71 (165); Bhargav Bhatt 3/81 (40 overs)		249 (88.1 overs); Ninad Rathva 102 (182); Shivam Mavi 2/40 (12.1 overs)
177 (54 overs); Dhruv Jurel 50 (61); Ninad Rathva 5/56 (21 overs)		189/6 (47.2 overs); Shashwat Rawat 68 (97); Saurabh Kumar 2/54 (17 overs)

Baroda won by 4 wickets
Moti Bagh Stadium, Vadodara
Umpires: Piyush Khakhar and Ranjeev Sharma
Player of the match: Ninad Rathva (Baroda)

- Uttar Pradesh won the toss and elected to bat.
- Mahesh Pithiya (Baroda) made his first-class debut.
- Umpire Replacement: Piyush Khakhar for KN Ananthapadmanabhan.

=== Round 4 ===
3–6 January 2023
Scorecard

Nagaland	v	Odisha
433 (142.5 overs); Chetan Bist 129 (213); Tarani Sa 3/86 (25 overs)		535/8d (146.1 overs); Shantanu Mishra 200* (405); Akash Singh 4/73 (25 overs)
120/1 (32 overs); Joshua Ozukum 56 (86); Jayanta Behera 1/34 (12 overs)

Match drawn
DRIEMS Ground, Cuttack
Umpires: Piyush Khakhar and Ravi Shankar
Player of the match: Shantanu Mishra (Odisha)

- Odisha won the toss and elected to field.

3–6 January 2023
Scorecard

Bengal	v	Uttarakhand
387 (120.5 overs); Abhimanyu Easwaran 165 (287); Mayank Mishra 6/95 (34 overs)		272 (105.3 overs); Kunal Chandela 136 (304); Pradipta Pramanik 4/58 (32.3 overs)
206/7d (58 overs); Abhimanyu Easwaran 82* (150); Mayank Mishra 4/99 (24 overs)		69/0 (23 overs); Avneesh Sudha 54* (87)

Match drawn
Abhimanyu Cricket Academy, Dehradun
Umpires: Abhijit Deshmukh and Sabyasachi Sarkar
Player of the match: Abhimanyu Easwaran (Bengal)

- Uttarakhand won the toss and elected to field.
- Geet Puri (Bengal) made his first-class debut.

3–6 January 2023
Scorecard

Haryana	v	Uttar Pradesh
365 (116.2 overs); Ankit Kumar 174 (286); Aaqib Khan 4/73 (18.5 overs)		197 (55.1 overs); Priyam Garg 64 (99); Ajit Chahal 3/70 (18 overs)
		72/1 (12 overs) (f/o); Priyam Garg 36* (27); Ajit Chahal 1/41 (6 overs)

Match drawn
BRSABV Ekana Cricket Stadium, Lucknow
Umpires: Puttarangaiah Jayapal and Prabhakar Rao
Player of the match: Ankit Kumar (Haryana)

- Uttar Pradesh won the toss and elected to field.
- No play was held on Day 1 due to rain.
- Bhuwan Rohilla (Haryana) made his first-class debut.

3–6 January 2023
Scorecard

Baroda	v	Himachal Pradesh
355 (97.2 overs); Vishnu Solanki 178 (273); Kanwar Abhinay 3/63 (20 overs)		561/8d (172 overs); Prashant Chopra 159 (280); Ninad Rathva 4/127 (41 overs)
216/6 (86 overs); Pratyush Kumar 59 (150); Gurvinder Singh 5/59 (31 overs)

Match drawn
Moti Bagh Stadium, Vadodara
Umpires: NR Seetharam Prabhu and Krishnamachari Srinivasan
Player of the match: Ankit Kalsi (Himachal Pradesh)

- Baroda won the toss and elected to bat.

=== Round 5 ===
10–13 January 2023
Scorecard

Baroda	v	Bengal
269 (100.1 overs); Jyotsnil Singh 85 (217); Akash Deep 4/71 (28 overs)		191 (59.3 overs); Anustup Majumdar 90 (171); Sahejadkhan Pathan 5/48 (17.3 overs)
98 (44 overs); Pratyush Kumar 62* (149); Mukesh Kumar 4/43 (14 overs)		179/3 (61 overs); Sudip Kumar Gharami 76* (140); Soyeb Sopariya 2/38 (16 overs)

Bengal won by 7 wickets
Bengal Cricket Academy Ground, Kalyani
Umpires: Abhijit Bengeri and Saurabh Dhote
Player of the match: Anustup Majumdar (Bengal)

- Baroda won the toss and elected to bat.
- Sahejadkhan Pathan (Baroda) made his first-class debut.
- Pratyush Kumar (Baroda) carried his bat.

10–12 January 2023
Scorecard

Nagaland	v	Haryana
88 (42.1 overs); Shrikant Mundhe 32 (89); Amit Rana 5/15 (7.1 overs)		229/7d (49 overs); Yuvraj Singh 75 (111); Imliwati Lemtur 4/76 (18 overs)
72 (23 overs); Akash Singh 30* (42); Amit Rana 7/24 (10 overs)

Haryana won by an innings and 69 runs
Chaudhary Bansi Lal Cricket Stadium, Rohtak
Umpires: Mihir Parmar and Chettithody Shamshuddin
Player of the match: Amit Rana (Haryana)

- Haryana won the toss and elected to field.
- Khriesavituo Solo (Nagaland) made his first-class debut.

10–13 January 2023
Scorecard

Odisha	v	Himachal Pradesh
191 (50 overs); Shantanu Mishra 52 (107); Vaibhav Arora 5/51 (14 overs)		258 (76.5 overs); Prashant Chopra 138 (198); Sunil Roul 6/62 (22.5 overs)
374 (95.5 overs); Govinda Poddar 135 (176); Vinay Galetiya 2/58 (15 overs)		310/7 (76.3 overs); Ankit Kalsi 165* (201); Basant Mohanty 3/40 (16 overs)

Himachal Pradesh won by 3 wickets
Atal Bihari Vajpayee Stadium, Nadaun
Umpires: Anurag Rathour and Krishnamachari Srinivasan
Player of the match: Ankit Kalsi (Himachal Pradesh)

- Himachal Pradesh won the toss and elected to field.
- Sunil Roul (Odisha) made his first-class debut.

10–13 January 2023
Scorecard

Uttar Pradesh	v	Uttarakhand
142 (67.5 overs); Sameer Choudhary 49 (126); Agrim Tiwari 4/27 (20 overs)		172/4 (53.3 overs); Kunal Chandela 56 (135); Karthikeya Jaiswal 3/40 (16 overs)

Match drawn
BRSABV Ekana Cricket Stadium, Lucknow
Umpires: Nand Kishore and Keshav K. Kolle
Player of the match: Agrim Tiwari (Uttarakhand)

- Uttar Pradesh won the toss and elected to bat.
- Match was effected due to rain.
- Sameer Choudhary, Shiva Singh and Bihari Rai (Uttar Pradesh) all made their first-class debuts.

=== Round 6 ===
17–20 January 2023
Scorecard

Baroda	v	Uttarakhand
86 (35.3 overs); Bhargav Bhatt 23 (25); Agrim Tiwari 5/40 (13 overs)		199 (77.4 overs); Swapnil Singh 63 (146); Ninad Rathva 4/19 (7.4 overs)
336/7 (102 overs); Shashwat Rawat 89 (173); Swapnil Singh 3/80 (27 overs)

Match drawn
Abhimanyu Cricket Academy, Dehradun
Umpires: Krishnamachari Srinivasan and Akshay Totre
Player of the match: Agrim Tiwari (Uttarakhand)

- Uttarakhand won the toss and elected to field.

17–20 January 2023
Scorecard

Himachal Pradesh	v	Nagaland
346 (104.5 overs); Ankit Kalsi 160* (317); Imliwati Lemtur 5/74 (28.5 overs)		233 (79.5 overs); Rongsen Jonathan 96 (168); Vinay Galetiya 6/62 (23.5 overs)
263/3d (46 overs); Prashant Chopra 115* (143); Imliwati Lemtur 1/66 (15 overs)		31/4 (17 overs); Yugandhar Singh 17 (46); Nikhil Gangta 1/0 (1 over)

Match drawn
Atal Bihari Vajpayee Stadium, Nadaun
Umpires: Nagaraj Ramesh and Rajesh Timaney
Player of the match: Ankit Kalsi (Himachal Pradesh)

- Nagaland won the toss and elected to field.

17–20 January 2023
Scorecard

Odisha	v	Uttar Pradesh
226 (87 overs); Shantanu Mishra 109 (226); Kunal Yadav 5/47 (17 overs)		362 (100.3 overs); Priyam Garg 122 (185); Suryakant Pradhan 4/76 (25 overs)
335/4 (96 overs); Subhranshu Senapati 145 (179); Saurabh Kumar 2/98 (34 overs)

Match drawn
Victoria Park Stadium, Meerut
Umpires: Anil Dandekar and Bhavesh Patel
Player of the match: Kunal Yadav (Uttar Pradesh)

- Odisha won the toss and elected to bat.
- Kunal Yadav (Uttar Pradesh) made his first-class debut.

17–20 January 2023
Scorecard

Bengal	v	Haryana
419 (113.4 overs); Anustup Majumdar 145 (245); Harshal Patel 4/80 (24.4 overs)		163 (52 overs); Sumit Kumar 70* (74); Akash Deep 5/61 (13 overs)
		206 (79 overs) (f/o); Yuvraj Singh 78 (187); Akash Deep 5/51 (21 overs)

Bengal won by an innings and 50 runs
Chaudhary Bansi Lal Cricket Stadium, Rohtak
Umpires: Nitin Pandit and Vinod Seshan
Player of the match: Akash Deep (Bengal)

- Haryana won the toss and elected to field.
- Suvankar Bal (Bengal) made his first-class debut.

=== Round 7 ===
24–27 January 2023
Scorecard

Odisha	v	Bengal
265 (98 overs); Subhranshu Senapati 67 (127); Pritam Chakraborty 3/59 (25 overs)		100 (35.5 overs); Abhimanyu Easwaran 27 (50); Sunil Roul 3/19 (8 overs)
112/3 (22.2 overs); Anurag Sarangi 37 (61); Akash Ghatak 2/29 (6 overs)		276 (79 overs) (f/o); Abhimanyu Easwaran 101 (175); Sunil Roul 6/96 (27 overs)

Odisha won by 7 wickets
Eden Gardens, Kolkata
Umpires: Manish Jain and Chettithody Shamshuddin
Player of the match: Sunil Roul (Odisha)

- Bengal won the toss and elected to field.
- Rakesh Pattnaik (Odisha) and Akash Ghatak (Bengal) both made their first-class debuts.

24–27 January 2023
Scorecard

Haryana	v	Uttarakhand
233 (71.3 overs); Sumit Kumar 86 (97); Avneesh Sudha 6/51 (13.3 overs)		269 (75.4 overs); Avneesh Sudha 62 (123); Nishant Sindhu 4/57 (14 overs)
168/7d (42.5 overs); Yuvraj Singh 77* (114); Mayank Mishra 4/44 (13.5 overs)		61/5 (23 overs); Kunal Chandela 23 (36); Jayant Yadav 3/40 (11 overs)

Match drawn
Chaudhary Bansi Lal Cricket Stadium, Rohtak
Umpires: Krishnendu Pal and Nikhil Patwardhan
Player of the match: Avneesh Sudha (Uttarakhand)

- Uttarakhand won the toss and elected to field.
- Jaideep Bhambhu (Haryana) and Nikhil Kohli (Uttarakhand) both made their first-class debuts.

24–27 January 2023
Scorecard

Himachal Pradesh	v	Uttar Pradesh
92/2 (26 overs); Amit Kumar 35* (63); Bihari Rai 2/13 (7 overs)

Match drawn
Atal Bihari Vajpayee Stadium, Nadaun
Umpires: Ulhas Gandhe and Chirra Ravikanthreddy

- Himachal Pradesh won the toss and elected to bat.
- No play was held on Day 2 and Day 3 due to rain.

24–26 January 2023
Scorecard

Baroda	v	Nagaland
561/6d (128 overs); Vishnu Solanki 179 (281); Chopise Hopongkyu 2/71 (16 overs)		130 (45.5 overs); Hokaito Zhimomi 44 (87); Bhargav Bhatt 5/40 (20 overs)
		88 (30.1 overs) (f/o); Chetan Bist 28 (56); Ninad Rathva 4/32 (8.1 overs)

Baroda won by an innings and 343 runs
Moti Bagh Stadium, Vadodara
Umpires: Rajeev Godara and M. Madhu
Player of the match: Ninad Rathva (Baroda)

- Baroda won the toss and elected to bat.
