= 2025–26 Irani Cup =

Cricket match

Vidarbha	Rest of India
342	214
&	&
232	267
- Vidarbha won by 93 runs
- Date: 1–5 October 2025
- Venue: Vidarbha Cricket Association Stadium, Nagpur
- Player of the match: Atharva Taide (Vidarbha)
- Umpires: Rohan Pandit and Kannur Swaroopanand

The 2025–26 Irani Cup was the 62nd edition of the Irani Cup, a first-class cricket tournament in India, organised by the Board of Control for Cricket in India (BCCI). It was played as a one-off match between Vidarbha, the winners of the 2024–25 Ranji Trophy, and a Rest of India cricket team.

It took place from 1 to 5 October 2025 in Nagpur. The tournament was part of the 2025 Indian domestic cricket season, announced by the BCCI in June 2025. Mumbai were the defending champions.

== Squads ==
Vidarbha	Rest of India
Batters
Yash Rathod (vc); Danish Malewar; Aman Mokhade; Dhruv Shorey; Atharva Taide	Rajat Patidar (c); Ruturaj Gaikwad (vc); Yash Dhull; Abhimanyu Easwaran; Shaik Rasheed
Wicket-Keepers
Akshay Wadkar (c); Shivam Deshmukh	Aryan Juyal; Ishan Kishan
All-Rounders
Nachiket Bhute; Harsh Dubey; Yash Kadam; Parth Rekhade	Saransh Jain; Tanush Kotian; Manav Suthar
Bowlers
Praful Hinge; Akshay Karnewar; Darshan Nalkande; Aditya Thakare; Yash Thakur	Khaleel Ahmed; Gurnoor Brar; Akash Deep; Anshul Kamboj

== Match ==
1–5 October 2025
Scorecard

Vidarbha	v	Rest of India
342 (84 overs); Atharva Taide 143 (283); Akash Deep 3/51 (19 overs)		214 (69.5 overs); Rajat Patidar 66 (125); Yash Thakur 4/66 (16.5 overs)
232 (94.1 overs); Aman Mokhade 37 (76); Anshul Kamboj 4/34 (12 overs)		267 (73.5 overs); Yash Dhull 92 (117); Harsh Dubey 4/73 (27.5 overs)

Vidarbha won by 93 runs
Vidarbha Cricket Association Stadium, Nagpur
Umpires: Rohan Pandit and Kannur Swaroopanand
Player of the match: Atharva Taide (Vidarbha)

- Vidarbha won the toss and elected to bat.
