= 2021–22 Syed Mushtaq Ali Trophy Group B =

Cricket tournament

- Dates: 4 – 22 November 2021
- Administrator: BCCI
- Cricket format: Twenty20 cricket
- Tournament format: Round-robin
- Participants: 6

The 2021–22 Syed Mushtaq Ali Trophy was the fourteenth season of the Syed Mushtaq Ali Trophy, a Twenty20 cricket tournament played in India. It was contested by 38 teams, divided into six groups, with six teams in Group B. The tournament was announced by BCCI on 3 July 2021.

Bengal and Karnataka both won four matches, with Bengal topping the group on net run rate. Therefore, Bengal advanced to the quarter-finals and Karnataka progressed to the preliminary quarter-finals.

== Points table ==
Pos	Team	Pld	W	L	NR	Pts	NRR
1	Bengal	5	4	1	0	16	0.995
2	Karnataka	5	4	1	0	16	0.379
3	Mumbai	5	3	2	0	12	0.990
4	Chhattisgarh	5	2	3	0	8	−0.146
5	Baroda	5	1	4	0	4	−0.750
6	Services	5	1	4	0	4	−1.513

Source: ESPN Cricinfo

Advanced to Quarter-final
Advanced to Preliminary quarter-final

== Fixtures ==
=== Round 1 ===
4 November 2021
Scorecard

Chhattisgarh; 118/7 (20 overs)	v	Bengal; 119/3 (17 overs)
Akhil Herwadkar 73* (60); Mukesh Kumar 2/26 (3 overs)		Sudip Chatterjee 51* (46); Ravi Kiran 2/24 (4 overs)

Bengal won by 7 wickets
Barsapara Cricket Stadium, Guwahati
Umpires: Anil Chaudhary and Nikhil Patwardhan

- Bengal won the toss and elected to field.
- Karan Lal (Bengal) made his T20 debut.

4 November 2021
Scorecard

Karnataka; 166/4 (20 overs)	v	Mumbai; 157/6 (20 overs)
Manish Pandey 84 (64); Mohit Avasthi 2/32 (4 overs)		Ajinkya Rahane 75 (54); K. C. Cariappa 3/26 (4 overs)

Karnataka won by 9 runs
Barsapara Cricket Stadium, Guwahati
Umpires: Anil Chaudhary and Nikhil Patwardhan

- Mumbai won the toss and elected to field.
- Vidyadhar Patil (Karnataka), Mohit Avasthi, Aman Hakim Khan and Tanush Kotian (Mumbai) all made their T20 debuts.

4 November 2021
Scorecard

Baroda; 124/9 (20 overs)	v	Services; 128/8 (20 overs)
Bhanu Pania 55 (45); Nitin Yadav 3/22 (4 overs)		Diwesh Pathania 41* (28); Ninad Rathva 3/8 (4 overs)

Services won by 2 wickets
Nehru Stadium, Guwahati
Umpires: Akshay Marathe and Krishnamachari Srinivasan

- Services won the toss and elected to field.
- Ansh Patel and Shashwat Rawat (Baroda) both made their T20 debuts.

=== Round 2 ===
5 November 2021
Scorecard

Chhattisgarh; 145/5 (20 overs)	v	Karnataka; 146/6 (19.3 overs)
Shashank Singh 52* (27); K. C. Cariappa 2/14 (4 overs)		BR Sharath 42* (26); Shashank Singh 3/4 (3 overs)

Karnataka won by 4 wickets
Barsapara Cricket Stadium, Guwahati
Umpires: Akshay Marathe and Krishnamachari Srinivasan

- Karnataka won the toss and elected to field.
- Sanjeet Desai (Chhattisgarh) made his T20 debut.

5 November 2021
Scorecard

Bengal; 146/7 (20 overs)	v	Baroda; 144/6 (20 overs)
Abhishek Das 35 (27); Atit Sheth 3/33 (4 overs)		Krunal Pandya 57* (43); Shahbaz Ahmed 2/26 (4 overs)

Bengal won by 2 runs
Barsapara Cricket Stadium, Guwahati
Umpires: Akshay Marathe and Krishnamachari Srinivasan

- Bengal won the toss and elected to bat.

5 November 2021
Scorecard

Mumbai; 154/7 (20 overs)	v	Services; 137/7 (20 overs)
Ajinkya Rahane 54 (44); Vikas Yadav 2/13 (4 overs)		Rajat Paliwal 64 (49); Tushar Deshpande 3/35 (4 overs)

Mumbai won by 17 runs
Nehru Stadium, Guwahati
Umpires: Yeshwant Barde and Nitin Pandit

- Services won the toss and elected to field.

=== Round 3 ===
6 November 2021
Scorecard

Karnataka; 142/6 (20 overs)	v	Services; 109/8 (20 overs)
Manish Pandey 51 (48); Diwesh Pathania 2/31 (4 overs)		Rahul Singh 34 (44); Vijaykumar Vyshak 3/25 (4 overs)

Karnataka won by 33 runs
Barsapara Cricket Stadium, Guwahati
Umpires: Yeshwant Barde and Nitin Pandit

- Services won the toss and elected to field.
- MB Dharshan and Vijaykumar Vyshak (Karnataka) both made their T20 debuts.

6 November 2021
Scorecard

Mumbai; 131/7 (20 overs)	v	Bengal; 121/8 (20 overs)
Shivam Dube 24 (23); Writtick Chatterjee 2/19 (4 overs)		Kaif Ahmed 31 (31); Mohit Avasthi 3/25 (4 overs)

Mumbai won by 10 runs
Barsapara Cricket Stadium, Guwahati
Umpires: Yeshwant Barde and Nitin Pandit

- Mumbai won the toss and elected to bat.

6 November 2021
Scorecard

Chhattisgarh; 94 (19 overs)	v	Baroda; 98/4 (17.1 overs)
Amandeep Khare 27 (31); Krunal Pandya 4/15 (4 overs)		Ninad Rathva 33* (27); Ravi Kiran 2/14 (3 overs)

Baroda won by 6 wickets
Nehru Stadium, Guwahati
Umpires: Anil Chaudhary and Nikhil Patwardhan

- Chhattisgarh won the toss and elected to bat.
- Parth Kohli (Baroda) made his T20 debut.

=== Round 4 ===
8 November 2021
Scorecard

Services; 90/8 (20 overs)	v	Bengal; 91/1 (10.5 overs)
Devender Lochab 34* (51); Pradipta Pramanik 2/16 (4 overs)		Sudip Chatterjee 50 (28); Rahul Singh 1/15 (3 overs)

Bengal won by 9 wickets
Barsapara Cricket Stadium, Guwahati
Umpires: Anil Chaudhary and Nikhil Patwardhan

- Bengal won the toss and elected to field.
- Sufiyan Alam (Services) made his T20 debut.

8 November 2021
Scorecard

Baroda; 134/7 (20 overs)	v	Karnataka; 137/3 (19.1 overs)
Bhanu Pania 36 (38); Krishnappa Gowtham 2/17 (4 overs)		Devdutt Padikkal 56 (47); Ninad Rathva 2/15 (4 overs)

Karnataka won by 7 wickets
Barsapara Cricket Stadium, Guwahati
Umpires: Anil Chaudhary and Nikhil Patwardhan

- Baroda won the toss and elected to bat.

8 November 2021
Scorecard

Chhattisgarh; 157/5 (20 overs)	v	Mumbai; 156/5 (20 overs)
Shashank Singh 57 (28); Siddhesh Lad 1/12 (2 overs)		Ajinkya Rahane 69 (55); Sumit Ruikar 2/24 (4 overs)

Chhattisgarh won by 1 run
Nehru Stadium, Guwahati
Umpires: Nitin Pandit and Krishnamachari Srinivasan

- Chhattisgarh won the toss and elected to bat.

=== Round 5 ===
9 November 2021
Scorecard

Mumbai; 193/2 (20 overs)	v	Baroda; 111/9 (20 overs)
Prithvi Shaw 83 (63); Atit Sheth 1/32 (3 overs)		Vishnu Solanki 27 (31); Tanush Kotian 4/16 (4 overs)

Mumbai won by 82 runs
Barsapara Cricket Stadium, Guwahati
Umpires: Yeshwant Barde and Nitin Pandit

- Baroda won the toss and elected to field.
- Prashant Solanki (Mumbai) made his T20 debut.

9 November 2021
Scorecard

Chhattisgarh; 176/3 (20 overs)	v	Services; 141 (19.5 overs)
Shashank Chandrakar 67 (42); Sachidanand Pandey 2/34 (4 overs)		Rahul Singh 64 (28); Shubham Agarwal 5/13 (3.5 overs)

Chhattisgarh won by 35 runs
Barsapara Cricket Stadium, Guwahati
Umpires: Yeshwant Barde and Nitin Pandit

- Chhattisgarh won the toss and elected to bat.

9 November 2021
Scorecard

Karnataka; 134/8 (20 overs)	v	Bengal; 138/3 (18 overs)
Karun Nair 44 (44); Mukesh Kumar 3/33 (4 overs)		Abhimanyu Easwaran 51* (49); K. C. Cariappa 1/25 (4 overs)

Bengal won by 7 wickets
Nehru Stadium, Guwahati
Umpires: Akshay Marathe and Krishnamachari Srinivasan

- Karnataka won the toss and elected to bat.
- Sujit Yadav (Bengal) made his T20 debut.
