= 2024–25 Ranji Trophy =

Cricket tournament

- Official logo of Ranji Trophy 2024-25 Season
- Dates: 11 October 2024 – 26 February 2025
- Administrator: BCCI
- Cricket format: First-class cricket
- Tournament format: Round-robin then knockout
- Host: India
- Champions: Vidarbha (3rd title)
- Runners-up: Kerala
- Participants: 38
- Matches: 138
- Player of the series: Harsh Dubey (Vidarbha)
- Most runs: Yash Rathod (Vidarbha) (960)
- Most wickets: Harsh Dubey (Vidarbha) (69)

The 2024–25 Ranji Trophy also known as the IDFC First Bank Ranji Trophy for sponsorship reasons, was the 90th season of the Ranji Trophy taking place from 11 October to 26 February 2025. Mumbai were the defending champions.Vidarbha won the title by defeating Kerala.

== Format ==
The teams are divided into two categories, one named Elite category which has 32 teams split into four groups, and one named Plate category having 6 teams in one group. The Elite category teams play each other once, with the top two teams from each group qualifying for the quarter-finals. In the Plate Group teams also play each other once, but the top four teams qualify for the plate group knockouts, with the bottom two teams playing for the fifth and sixth positions, and another playoff for the third and fourth positions with the semi-final losers. The two Plate finalists are promoted to the Elite group for the next season, 2025–26, while the bottom two teams of all the four Elite groups combined - factoring in both points and the quotient will be relegated to Plate group.

Team changes from last season
▲ Promoted to Elite Groups	▼ Relegated to Plate Group
Hyderabad, Meghalaya	Manipur, Goa

== League stage ==
=== Group A ===
Pos	Team	Pld	W	L	T	D	NR	Pts	Quot
1	Jammu and Kashmir	7	5	0	0	2	0	35	1.577
2	Mumbai	7	4	2	0	1	0	29	1.744
3	Baroda	7	4	2	0	1	0	27	1.301
4	Services	7	3	3	0	1	0	23	0.864
5	Maharashtra	7	2	3	0	2	0	17	1.063
6	Odisha	7	2	3	0	1	1	17	0.715
7	Tripura	7	1	1	0	4	1	14	1.233
8	Meghalaya	7	0	7	0	0	0	0	0.343

Source: ESPNcricinfo

Advances to Quarter-final Relegated to Plate Group for next season

=== Group B ===
Pos	Team	Pld	W	L	T	D	NR	Pts	Quot
1	Vidarbha	7	6	0	0	1	0	40	1.490
2	Gujarat	7	4	0	0	3	0	32	1.147
3	Himachal Pradesh	7	3	4	0	0	0	21	1.015
4	Hyderabad	7	2	3	0	2	0	16	1.223
5	Rajasthan	7	1	2	0	4	0	16	1.000
6	Andhra	7	1	3	0	3	0	13	0.946
7	Uttarakhand	7	1	3	0	3	0	11	0.617
8	Puducherry	7	0	3	0	4	0	8	0.783

Source: ESPNcricinfo

Advances to Quarter-final Relegated to Plate Group for next season

=== Group C ===
Pos	Team	Pld	W	L	T	D	NR	Pts	Quot
1	Haryana	7	3	0	0	4	0	29	1.212
2	Kerala	7	3	0	0	4	0	28	1.813
3	Bengal	7	2	1	0	3	1	21	1.175
4	Karnataka	7	2	0	0	5	0	20	1.194
5	Madhya Pradesh	7	1	1	0	5	0	14	1.157
6	Uttar Pradesh	7	1	1	0	5	0	14	0.988
7	Punjab	7	1	4	0	2	0	11	0.826
8	Bihar	7	0	6	0	0	1	1	0.345

Source: ESPNcricinfo

Advances to Quarter-final Relegated to Plate Group for next season

=== Group D ===
Pos	Team	Pld	W	L	T	D	NR	Pts	Quot
1	Saurashtra	7	3	2	0	2	0	25	1.248
2	Tamil Nadu	7	3	1	0	3	0	25	1.670
3	Chandigarh	7	4	3	0	0	0	25	0.983
4	Delhi	7	2	2	0	3	0	21	0.872
5	Jharkhand	7	2	1	0	4	0	20	0.922
6	Railways	7	2	2	0	3	0	17	0.850
7	Chhattisgarh	7	0	2	0	5	0	11	1.110
8	Assam	7	0	3	0	4	0	6	0.624

Source: ESPNcricinfo

Advances to Quarter-final Relegated to Plate Group for next season

=== Plate Group ===
Pos	Team	Pld	W	L	T	D	NR	Pts
1	Goa	5	5	0	0	0	0	33
2	Nagaland	5	3	1	0	1	0	23
3	Mizoram	5	2	2	0	1	0	14
4	Sikkim	5	2	2	0	1	0	13
5	Manipur	5	1	3	0	1	0	9
6	Arunachal Pradesh	5	0	5	0	0	0	0

Source: ESPNcricinfo

Advances to Plate Finals

==== Plate Final ====
23–27 January 2025
Scorecard

Goa	v	Nagaland
276 (104.2 overs); Kashyap Bakhale 79 (188); Jagadeesha Suchith 4/69 (34 overs)		216 (66.5 overs); Rongsen Jonathan 86 (116); Heramb Parab 5/30 (12.5 overs)
517/7d (158 overs); Snehal Kauthankar 202* (374); Nagaho Chishi 2/71 (17 overs)		215 (69.3 overs); Hem Chetri 54 (126); Darshan Misal 5/48 (22)

Goa won by 362 runs
Nagaland Cricket Stadium, Sovima
Umpires: Vaibhav Dhokre and Kannur Swaroopanand
Player of the match: Snehal Kauthankar (Goa)

- Goa won the toss and elected to bat.
- Heramb Parab (Goa) took his first five-wicket haul in first-class cricket.

== Knockout stage ==
Quarter-finals
A1	Jammu and Kashmir	280 & 399/9d
C2	Kerala	281 & 295/6
D1	Saurashtra	216 & 197
B2	Gujarat	511
B1	Vidarbha	353 & 272
D2	Tamil Nadu	225 & 202
C1	Haryana	301 & 201
A2	Mumbai	315 & 339

Semi-finals
C2	Kerala	457 & 114/4
B2	Gujarat	455
B1	Vidarbha	383 & 292
A2	Mumbai	270 & 325

Final
SF1	Kerala	342
SF2	Vidarbha	379 & 375/9

=== Quarter-finals ===
8–12 February 2025
1st Quarter-final
Scorecard

Jammu and Kashmir	v	Kerala
280 (95.1 overs); Kanhaiya Wadhawan 48 (80); M. D. Nidheesh 6/75 (27 overs)		281 (85 overs); Salman Nizar 112* (172); Auqib Nabi 6/53 (27 overs)
399/9d (100.2 overs); Paras Dogra 132 (232); M. D. Nidheesh 4/89 (26 overs)		295/6 (126 overs); Mohammed Azharuddeen 67* (118); Sahil Lotra 2/50 (36 overs)

Match drawn (Kerala advanced on first-innings lead)
Maharashtra Cricket Association Stadium, Pune
Umpires: Vinod Seshan and Anish Sahasrabudhe
Player of the match: Salman Nizar (Kerala)

- Kerala won the toss and elected to field.
- M. D. Nidheesh (Kerala) took his first ten-wicket haul in first-class cricket.

8–12 February 2025
2nd Quarter-final
Scorecard

Vidarbha	v	Tamil Nadu
353 (121.1 overs); Karun Nair 122 (243); Vijay Shankar 3/75 (22 overs)		225 (64.3 overs); C Andre Siddarth 65 (89); Aditya Thakare 5/34 (16.3 overs)
272 (92.3 overs); Yash Rathod 112 (213); Sai Kishore 5/78 (26 overs)		202 (61.1 overs); Sonu Yadav 57 (84); Nachiket Bhute 3/19 (10 overs)

Vidarbha won by 198 runs
Vidarbha Cricket Association Ground, Nagpur
Umpires: K Nidhin and Abhijit Bhattacharya
Player of the match: Karun Nair (Vidarbha)

- Vidarbha won the toss and elected to bat.

8–12 February 2025
3rd Quarter-final
Scorecard

Mumbai	v	Haryana
315 (88.2 overs); Tanush Kotian 97 (173); Anshul Kamboj 3/71 (21 overs)		301 (84.5 overs); Ankit Kumar 136 (206); Shardul Thakur 6/58 (18.5 overs)
339 (85.3 overs); Ajinkya Rahane 108 (180); Anuj Thakral 4/70 (18 overs)		201 (57.3 overs); Lakshya Dalal 64 (130); Royston Dias 5/39 (10.3 overs)

Mumbai won by 152 runs
Eden Gardens, Kolkata
Umpires: Nitin Pandit and Amit Rana
Player of the match: Shardul Thakur (Mumbai)

- Mumbai won the toss and elected to bat.
- Yashvardhan Dalal (Haryana) made his first-class debut.
- Royston Dias (Mumbai) took his first five-wicket haul in first-class cricket.

8–12 February 2025
4th Quarter-final
Scorecard

Saurashtra	v	Gujarat
216 (72.1 overs); Chirag Jani 69 (148); Chintan Gaja 4/48 (21 overs)		511 (159.1 overs); Urvil Patel 140 (197); Dharmendrasinh Jadeja 5/120 (37.1 overs)
197 (62.1 overs); Harvik Desai 54 (103); Priyajit Jadeja 4/32 (8.1 overs)

Gujarat won by an innings and 98 runs
Niranjan Shah Stadium, Rajkot
Umpires: Parashar Joshi and Anil Dandekar
Player of the match: Jaymeet Patel (Gujarat)

- Gujarat won the toss and elected to field.
- Urvil Patel (Gujarat) scored his first century in first-class cricket.

=== Semi-finals ===
17–21 February 2025
1st Semi-final
Scorecard

Kerala	v	Gujarat
457 (187 overs); Mohammed Azharuddeen 177* (341); Arzan Nagwaswalla 3/81 (34 overs)		455 (174.4 overs); Priyank Panchal 148 (237); Aditya Sarwate 4/111 (45.4 overs)
114/4 (46 overs); Jalaj Saxena 37* (90); Manan Hingrajia 2/22 (10 overs)

Match drawn (Kerala advanced on first-innings lead)
Narendra Modi Stadium, Ahmedabad
Umpires: Ulhas Gandhe and Kannur Swaroopanand
Player of the match: Mohammed Azharuddeen (Kerala)

- Kerala won the toss and elected to bat.
- Ahammed Imran and Varun Nayanar (Kerala) both made their first-class debuts.

17–21 February 2025
2nd Semi-final
Scorecard

Vidarbha	v	Mumbai
383 (107.5 overs); Danish Malewar 79 (157); Shivam Dube 5/49 (11.5 overs)		270 (92 overs); Akash Anand 106 (256); Parth Rekhade 4/55 (30 overs)
292 (110.1 overs); Yash Rathod 151 (252); Shams Mulani 6/85 (44 overs)		325 (97.5 overs); Shardul Thakur 66 (124); Harsh Dubey 5/127 (41.5 overs)

Vidarbha won by 80 runs
Vidarbha Cricket Association Ground, Nagpur
Umpires: Virender Sharma and Akshay Totre
Player of the match: Yash Rathod (Vidarbha)

- Vidarbha won the toss and elected to bat.

=== Final ===
26 February – 2 March 2025
Final
Scorecard

Vidarbha	v	Kerala
379 (123.1 overs); Danish Malewar 153 (285); M. D. Nidheesh 3/61 (28.1 overs)		342 (125 overs); Sachin Baby 98 (235); Darshan Nalkande 3/52 (13 overs)
375/9 (143.5 overs); Karun Nair 135 (295); Aditya Sarwate 4/96 (44.5 overs)

Match drawn (Vidarbha won due to first-innings lead)
Vidarbha Cricket Association Ground, Nagpur
Umpires: Anil Chaudhary and Jayaraman Madanagopal
Player of the match: Danish Malewar (Vidarbha)

- Kerala won the toss and elected to field.

== See also ==
- 2024–25 Duleep Trophy
- 2024–25 Irani Cup
- 2024–25 Vijay Hazare Trophy
- 2024–25 Syed Mushtaq Ali Trophy
