= 2024–25 Syed Mushtaq Ali Trophy =

Indian cricket tournament

- Dates: 23 November – 15 December 2024
- Administrator: BCCI
- Cricket format: T20
- Tournament format(s): Round robin, then knockout
- Champions: Mumbai (2nd title)
- Runners-up: Madhya Pradesh
- Participants: 38
- Matches: 136
- Player of the series: Ajinkya Rahane (Mumbai)
- Most runs: Ajinkya Rahane (Mumbai) (469)
- Most wickets: Jagjit Singh (Chandigarh) (18)
- Official website: https://www.bcci.tv

The 2024–25 Syed Mushtaq Ali Trophy was the 17th edition of the Syed Mushtaq Ali Trophy, an annual Twenty20 tournament in India. The tournament was held from 23 November to 15 December 2024 and featured all 38 teams from the Ranji Trophy. The teams were divided into five groups, with three groups consisting of eight teams each and two groups comprising seven teams. The tournament was a part of the 2024–25 Indian domestic cricket season, as announced by the Board of Control for Cricket in India (BCCI) in 2024. Punjab were the defending champions.

Mumbai won the tournament, defeating Madhya Pradesh in the final by 5 wickets to secure the title for the second time in the tournament's history.

== Group Stage ==
The 38 teams were divided into 5 groups (8 teams in A, B and C group, 7 teams in D and E group)

=== Group A ===
Pos	Team	Pld	W	L	NR	Pts	NRR
1	Madhya Pradesh	7	6	1	0	24	1.536
2	Bengal	7	6	1	0	24	1.607
3	Punjab	7	5	2	0	20	1.570
4	Rajasthan	7	5	2	0	20	2.181
5	Hyderabad	7	3	4	0	12	1.974
6	Bihar	7	2	5	0	8	−1.646
7	Mizoram	7	1	6	0	4	−2.674
8	Meghalaya	7	0	7	0	0	−4.469

Updated to match(es) played on 5 December 2024. Source: ESPNcricinfo

Advanced to Quarter-final
Advanced to Preliminary quarter-final

=== Group B ===
Pos	Team	Pld	W	L	NR	Pts	NRR
1	Baroda	7	6	1	0	24	2.353
2	Saurashtra	7	6	1	0	24	2.267
3	Gujarat	7	6	1	0	24	1.932
4	Karnataka	7	3	4	0	12	1.092
5	Tamil Nadu	7	3	4	0	12	0.869
6	Tripura	7	2	5	0	8	−1.181
7	Uttarakhand	7	2	5	0	8	−1.151
8	Sikkim	7	0	7	0	0	−6.437

Updated to match(es) played on 5 December 2024. Source: ESPNcricinfo

Advanced to Quarter-final
Advanced to Preliminary quarter-final

=== Group C ===
Pos	Team	Pld	W	L	NR	Pts	NRR
1	Delhi	7	6	1	0	24	2.224
2	Uttar Pradesh	7	5	2	0	20	1.942
3	Jharkhand	7	5	2	0	20	1.893
4	Jammu and Kashmir	7	5	2	0	20	1.134
5	Haryana	7	3	4	0	12	1.672
6	Himachal Pradesh	7	3	4	0	12	0.196
7	Manipur	7	1	6	0	4	−2.370
8	Arunachal Pradesh	7	0	7	0	0	−7.611

Updated to match(es) played on 5 December 2024. Source: ESPNcricinfo

Advanced to Quarter-final
Advanced to Preliminary quarter-final

=== Group D ===
Pos	Team	Pld	W	L	NR	Pts	NRR
1	Vidarbha	6	4	1	1	18	1.839
2	Chandigarh	6	4	2	0	16	0.224
3	Railways	6	3	2	1	14	0.741
4	Assam	6	3	3	0	12	−2.213
5	Chhattisgarh	6	2	3	1	10	0.746
6	Puducherry	6	2	4	0	8	−1.474
7	Odisha	6	1	4	1	6	−0.106

Updated to match(es) played on 5 December 2024. Source: ESPNcricinfo

Advanced to Quarter-final
Advanced to Preliminary quarter-final

=== Group E ===
Pos	Team	Pld	W	L	NR	Pts	NRR
1	Mumbai	6	5	1	0	20	1.213
2	Andhra Pradesh	6	5	1	0	20	2.526
3	Kerala	6	4	2	0	16	0.850
4	Maharashtra	6	3	3	0	12	−0.154
5	Services	6	2	4	0	8	0.037
6	Goa	6	2	4	0	8	0.114
7	Nagaland	6	0	6	0	0	−4.538

Updated to match(es) played on 5 December 2024. Source: ESPNcricinfo

Advanced to Quarter-final
Advanced to Preliminary quarter-final

== Knockout Stage ==
Preliminary QF
C2	Uttar Pradesh	157/6 (19 overs)
E2	Andhra	156/6 (20 overs)
A2	Bengal	159/9 (20 overs)
D2	Chandigarh	156/9 (20 overs)

Quarter-finals
C1	Delhi	193/3 (20 overs)
C2	Uttar Pradesh	174 (20 overs)
A1	Madhya Pradesh	174/4 (19.2 overs)
B2	Saurashtra	173/7 (20 overs)
B1	Baroda	172/7 (20 overs)
A2	Bengal	131 (18 overs)
E1	Mumbai	224/4 (19.2 overs)
D1	Vidarbha	221/6 (20 overs)

Semi-finals
C1	Delhi	146/5 (20 overs)
A1	Madhya Pradesh	152/3 (15.4 overs)
B1	Baroda	158/7 (20 overs)
E1	Mumbai	164/4 (17.2 overs)

Final
A1	Madhya Pradesh	174/8 (20 overs)
E1	Mumbai	180/5 (17.5 overs)

=== Preliminary quarter-finals ===
1st Preliminary quarter-final
9 December 2024
11:00
Scorecard

Bengal; 159/9 (20 overs)	v	Chandigarh; 156/9 (20 overs)
Karan Lal 33 (25); Jagjit Singh 4/21 (4 overs)		Raj Bawa 32 (20); Sayan Ghosh 4/30 (4 overs)

Bengal won by 3 runs
M. Chinnaswamy Stadium, Bengaluru
Umpires: Mohit Krishnadas and Kannur Swaroopanand
Player of the match: Sayan Ghosh (Bengal)

- Chandigarh won the toss and elected to field.

2nd Preliminary quarter-final
9 December 2024
16:30 (D/N)
Scorecard

Andhra; 156/6 (20 overs)	v	Uttar Pradesh; 157/6 (19 overs)
SDNV Prasad 34* (22); Vipraj Nigam 2/20 (4 overs)		Karan Sharma 48 (31); Kodavandla Sudharsan 3/22 (4 overs)

Uttar Pradesh won by 4 wickets
M. Chinnaswamy Stadium, Bengaluru
Umpires: Abhijeet Bengeri and Abhijit Bhattacharya
Player of the match: Vipraj Nigam (Uttar Pradesh)

- Uttar Pradesh won the toss and elected to field.

=== Quarter-finals ===
1st quarter-final
11 December 2024
11:00
Scorecard

Baroda; 172/7 (20 overs)	v	Bengal; 131 (18 overs)
Shashwat Rawat 40 (26); Pradipta Pramanik 2/6 (2 overs)		Shahbaz Ahmed 55 (36); Lukman Meriwala 3/17 (3 overs)

Baroda won by 41 runs
M. Chinnaswamy Stadium, Bengaluru
Umpires: Jayaraman Madanagopal and Abhijeet Bengeri
Player of the match: Lukman Meriwala (Baroda)

- Bengal won the toss and elected to field.

2nd quarter-final
11 December 2024
16:30 (D/N)
Scorecard

Delhi; 193/3 (20 overs)	v	Uttar Pradesh; 174 (20 overs)
Anuj Rawat 73* (33); Nitish Rana 1/23 (3 overs)		Priyam Garg 54 (34); Prince Yadav 3/36 (4 overs)

Delhi won by 19 runs
M. Chinnaswamy Stadium, Bengaluru
Umpires: Jayaraman Madanagopal and Kannur Swaroopanand
Player of the match: Anuj Rawat (Delhi)

- Uttar Pradesh won the toss and elected to field.

3rd quarter-final
11 December 2024
09:00
Scorecard

Saurashtra; 173/7 (20 overs)	v	Madhya Pradesh; 174/4 (19.2 overs)
Chirag Jani 80* (45); Venkatesh Iyer 2/23 (3 overs)		Arpit Gaud 42 (29); Prerak Mankad 1/20 (2.3 overs)

Madhya Pradesh won by 6 wickets
KSCA Cricket Ground, Alur
Umpires: Abhijit Bhattacharya and K. N. Ananthapadmanabhan
Player of the match: Venkatesh Iyer (Madhya Pradesh)

- Madhya Pradesh won the toss and elected to field.

4th quarter-final
11 December 2024
13:30
Scorecard

Vidarbha; 221/6 (20 overs)	v	Mumbai; 224/4 (19.2 overs)
Atharva Taide 66 (41); Atharva Ankolekar 2/32 (4 overs)		Ajinkya Rahane 84 (45); Dipesh Parwani 2/33 (3.2 overs)

Mumbai won by 6 wickets
KSCA Cricket Ground, Alur
Umpires: K. N. Ananthapadmanabhan and Mohit Krishnadas
Player of the match: Ajinkya Rahane (Mumbai)

- Mumbai won the toss and elected to field.

=== Semi-finals ===
1st semi-final
13 December 2024
11:00
Scorecard

Baroda; 158/7 (20 overs)	v	Mumbai; 164/4 (17.2 overs)
Shivalik Sharma 36* (24); Suryansh Shedge 2/22 (2 overs)		Ajinkya Rahane 98 (56); Shashwat Rawat 1/6 (0.2 overs)

Mumbai won by 6 wickets
M. Chinnaswamy Stadium, Bengaluru
Umpires: Kannur Swaroopanand and Mohit Krishnadas
Player of the match: Ajinkya Rahane (Mumbai)

- Mumbai won the toss and elected to field.

2nd semi-final
13 December 2024
16:30 (D/N)
Scorecard

Delhi; 146/5 (20 overs)	v	Madhya Pradesh; 152/3 (15.4 overs)
Anuj Rawat 33* (24); Venkatesh Iyer 2/12 (2 overs)		Rajat Patidar 66* (29); Ishant Sharma 2/12 (3 overs)

Madhya Pradesh won by 7 wickets
M. Chinnaswamy Stadium, Bengaluru
Umpires: Abhijit Bhattacharya and Abhijeet Bengeri
Player of the match: Rajat Patidar (Madhya Pradesh)

- Madhya Pradesh won the toss and elected to field.

=== Final ===
Final
15 December 2024
16:30 (D/N)
Scorecard

Madhya Pradesh; 174/8 (20 overs)	v	Mumbai; 180/5 (17.5 overs)
Rajat Patidar 81* (40); Royston Dias 2/32 (3 overs)		Suryakumar Yadav 48 (35); Tripuresh Singh 2/34 (2.5 overs)

Mumbai won by 5 wickets
M. Chinnaswamy Stadium, Bengaluru
Umpires: Jayaraman Madanagopal and Kannur Swaroopanand
Player of the match: Suryansh Shedge (Mumbai)

- Mumbai won the toss and elected to field.

== See also ==
- 2024–25 Ranji Trophy
- 2024–25 Duleep Trophy
- 2024–25 Irani Cup
- 2024–25 Vijay Hazare Trophy
