= 2024–25 Vijay Hazare Trophy =

Indian cricket tournament

- Dates: 21 December 2024 – 18 January 2025
- Administrator: BCCI
- Cricket format: List A cricket
- Tournament format(s): Round-robin and Playoff format
- Host: India
- Champions: Karnataka (5th title)
- Runners-up: Vidarbha
- Participants: 38
- Matches: 105
- Player of the series: Karun Nair (Vidarbha)
- Most runs: Karun Nair (779) (Vidarbha)
- Most wickets: Arshdeep Singh (20) (Punjab)

The 2024–25 Vijay Hazare Trophy was the 32nd edition of the Vijay Hazare Trophy, an annual List A cricket tournament in India. It was played from 21 December 2024 to 18 January 2025. Haryana were the defending champions.

In the final, Karnataka defeated Vidarbha by 36 runs to win their fifth title.

== Standings ==
=== Group A ===
Pos	Team	Pld	W	L	NR	Pts	NRR	Qualification
1	Gujarat	7	7	0	0	28	2.582	Advanced to Quarter-final
2	Haryana	7	6	1	0	24	0.728	Advanced to Preliminary quarter-final
3	Jharkhand	7	4	3	0	16	0.423	
4	Uttarakhand	7	3	4	0	12	0.846	
5	Goa	7	3	4	0	12	−0.676	
6	Assam	7	3	4	0	12	−0.816	
7	Odisha	7	2	5	0	8	0.170	
8	Manipur	7	0	7	0	0	−2.952	

Source: ESPNcricinfo

=== Group B ===
Pos	Team	Pld	W	L	NR	Pts	NRR	Qualification
1	Maharashtra	7	6	1	0	24	1.736	Advanced to Quarter-final
2	Rajasthan	7	5	2	0	20	0.349	Advanced to Preliminary quarter-final
3	Railways	7	5	2	0	20	0.856	
4	Himachal Pradesh	7	4	3	0	16	0.649	
5	Andhra	7	4	3	0	16	1.115	
6	Services	7	2	5	0	8	−0.510	
7	Sikkim	7	2	5	0	8	−1.395	
8	Meghalaya	7	0	7	0	0	−2.474	

Source: ESPNcricinfo

=== Group C ===
Pos	Team	Pld	W	L	NR	Pts	NRR	Qualification
1	Karnataka	7	6	1	0	24	1.393	Advanced to Quarter-final
2	Punjab	7	6	1	0	24	2.401	Advanced to Quarter-final
3	Mumbai	7	5	2	0	20	2.114	
4	Hyderabad	7	4	3	0	16	0.516	
5	Puducherry	7	3	4	0	12	−0.880	
6	Saurashtra	7	3	4	0	12	0.570	
7	Nagaland	7	1	6	0	4	−0.690	
8	Arunachal Pradesh	7	0	7	0	0	−6.246	

Source: ESPNcricinfo

=== Group D ===
Pos	Team	Pld	W	L	NR	Pts	NRR	Qualification
1	Vidarbha	6	6	0	0	24	1.996	Advanced to Quarter-final
2	Tamil Nadu	6	4	1	1	18	2.443	Advanced to Preliminary quarter-final
3	Uttar Pradesh	6	3	2	1	14	0.338	
4	Chhattisgarh	6	2	3	1	10	−1.122	
5	Chandigarh	6	2	3	1	10	0.415	
6	Jammu and Kashmir	6	1	4	1	6	−0.560	
7	Mizoram	6	0	5	1	2	−4.298	

Source: ESPNcricinfo

=== Group E ===
Pos	Team	Pld	W	L	NR	Pts	NRR	Qualification
1	Baroda	6	5	1	0	20	0.851	Advanced to Quarter-final
2	Bengal	6	4	1	1	18	0.539	Advanced to Preliminary quarter-final
3	Madhya Pradesh	6	3	2	1	14	0.583	
4	Delhi	6	3	3	0	12	0.371	
5	Kerala	6	2	3	1	10	0.652	
6	Tripura	6	1	4	1	6	−1.894	
7	Bihar	6	1	5	0	4	−1.261	

Source: ESPNcricinfo

== Knockout stage ==
Preliminary quarter-finals
A2	Haryana	298/9 (50)
E2	Bengal	226 (43.1)
B2	Rajasthan	267 (47.3)
D2	Tamil Nadu	248 (47.1)

Quarter-finals
A2	Haryana	201/8 (44)
A1	Gujarat	196 (45.2)
C1	Karnataka	281/8 (50)
E1	Baroda	276 (49.5)
B2	Rajasthan	291/8 (50)
D1	Vidarbha	292/1 (43.3 overs)
B1	Maharashtra	275/6 (50)
C2	Punjab	205 (44.4)

Semi-finals
A1	Haryana	237/9 (50)
C1	Karnataka	238/5 (47.2)
D1	Vidarbha	380/3 (50)
B1	Maharashtra	311/7 (50)

Final
C1	Karnataka	348/6 (50 overs)
D1	Vidarbha	312 (48.2 overs)

=== Preliminary quarter-finals ===
09:00
9 January 2025
Scorecard

Rajasthan; 267 (47.3 overs)	v	Tamil Nadu; 248 (47.1 overs)
Abhijeet Tomar 111 (125); Varun Chakravarthy 5/52 (9 overs)		Narayan Jagadeesan 65 (52); Aman Shekhawat 3/60 (8.1 overs)

Rajasthan won by 19 runs
Kotambi Stadium, Vadodara
Umpires: Abhijit Bhattacharya and Saiyed Khalid
Player of the match: Abhijeet Tomar (Rajasthan)

- Tamil Nadu won the toss and elected to field.

09:00
9 January 2025
Scorecard

Haryana; 298/9 (50 overs)	v	Bengal; 226 (43.1 overs)
Nishant Sindhu 64 (67); Mohammed Shami 3/61 (10 overs)		Abishek Porel 57 (78); Parth Vats 3/33 (8 overs)

Haryana won by 72 runs
Moti Bagh Stadium, Vadodara
Umpires: Vinod Seshan and Kannur Swaroopanand
Player of the match: Parth Vats (Haryana)

- Bengal won the toss and elected to field.

=== Quarter-finals ===
09:00
12 January 2025
Scorecard

Gujarat; 196 (45.2 overs)	v	Haryana; 201/8 (44 overs)
Hemang Patel 54 (62); Anuj Thakral 3/39 (10 overs)		Himanshu Rana 66 (89); Ravi Bishnoi 4/46 (10 overs)

Haryana won by 2 wickets
Moti Bagh Stadium, Vadodara
Umpires: Vinod Seshan and Kannur Swaroopanand
Player of the match: Anuj Thakral (Haryana)

- Haryana won the toss and elected to field.
- Anuj Thakral (Haryana) made his List A debut.

09:00
12 January 2025
Scorecard

Rajasthan; 291/8 (50 overs)	v	Vidarbha; 292/1 (43.3 overs)
Kartik Sharma 62 (61); Yash Thakur 4/39 (10 overs)		Karun Nair 122* (82); Kukna Ajay Singh 1/40 (6 overs)

Vidarbha won by 9 wickets
Kotambi Stadium, Vadodara
Umpires: Abhijit Bhattacharya and Saiyed Khalid
Player of the match: Dhruv Shorey (Vidarbha)

- Vidarbha won the toss and elected to field.

09:00
11 January 2025
Scorecard

Maharashtra; 275/6 (50 overs)	v	Punjab; 205 (44.4 overs)
Arshin Kulkarni 107 (137); Arshdeep Singh 3/56 (9 overs)		Arshdeep Singh 49 (39); Mukesh Choudhary 3/44 (8 overs)

Maharashtra won by 70 runs
Kotambi Stadium, Vadodara
Umpires: Saiyed Khalid and Jayaraman Madanagopal
Player of the match: Arshin Kulkarni (Maharashtra)

- Punjab won the toss and elected to field.
- Arshin Kulkarni (Maharashtra) made his List A debut and also scored his maiden century in List A cricket.

09:00
11 January 2025
Scorecard

Karnataka; 281/8 (50 overs)	v	Baroda; 276 (49.5 overs)
Devdutt Padikkal 102 (99); Atit Sheth 3/41 (8 overs)		Shashwat Rawat 104 (126); Shreyas Gopal 2/38 (10 overs)

Karnataka won by 5 runs
Moti Bagh Stadium, Vadodara
Umpires: Abhijit Bhattacharya and Rohan Pandit
Player of the match: Devdutt Padikkal (Karnataka)

- Baroda won the toss and elected to field.
- Shashwat Rawat (Baroda) scored his maiden century in List A cricket.

=== Semi-finals ===
13:30
15 January 2025 (D/N)
Scorecard

Haryana; 237/9 (50 overs)	v	Karnataka; 238/5 (47.2 overs)
Ankit Kumar 48 (52); Abhilash Shetty 4/34 (10 overs)		Devdutt Padikkal 86 (113); Nishant Sindhu 2/47 (10 overs)

Karnataka won by 5 wickets
Kotambi Stadium, Vadodara
Umpires: Vinod Seshan and Kannur Swaroopanand
Player of the match: Devdutt Padikkal (Karnataka)

- Karnataka won the toss and elected to field.
- Devdutt Padikkal (Karnataka) scored his 2,000th run in List A cricket and became fastest in history to 2,000 List A runs in terms of innings (31).

13:30
16 January 2025 (D/N)
Scorecard

Vidarbha; 380/3 (50 overs)	v	Maharashtra; 311/7 (50 overs)
Yash Rathod 116 (101); Mukesh Choudhary 2/80 (9 overs)		Arshin Kulkarni 90 (101); Darshan Nalkande 3/64 (10 overs)

Vidarbha won by 69 runs
Kotambi Stadium, Vadodara
Umpires: Abhijit Bhattacharya and Nitin Menon
Player of the match: Yash Rathod (Vidarbha)

- Maharashtra won the toss and elected to field.
- Karun Nair (Vidarbha) scored his 3,000th run in List A cricket.

=== Final ===
13:30
18 January 2025 (D/N)
Scorecard

Karnataka; 348/6 (50 overs)	v	Vidarbha; 312 (48.2 overs)
Ravichandran Smaran 101 (92); Darshan Nalkande 2/67 (9 overs)		Dhruv Shorey 110 (111); Vasuki Koushik 3/47 (10 overs)

Karnataka won by 36 runs
Kotambi Stadium, Vadodara
Umpires: Nitin Menon and Rohan Pandit
Player of the match: Ravichandran Smaran (Karnataka)

- Vidarbha won the toss and elected to field.

== See also ==
- 2024–25 Ranji Trophy
- 2024–25 Duleep Trophy
- 2024–25 Irani Cup
- 2024–25 Syed Mushtaq Ali Trophy
