= 2021–22 Ranji Trophy Group F =

Cricket tournament

- Dates: 17 February – 26 June 2022
- Administrator(s): BCCI
- Cricket format: First-class cricket
- Tournament format(s): Round-robin then knockout
- Participants: 4

The 2021–22 Ranji Trophy was the 87th season of the Ranji Trophy, the premier first-class cricket tournament in India. It was contested by 38 teams, divided into eight groups, with four teams in Group F. All the Group F league matches took place in Delhi. The tournament was announced by the Board of Control for Cricket in India (BCCI) on 3 July 2021. Punjab won Group F to progress to the knockout stage of the tournament.

== Points table ==
Pos	Team	Pld	W	L	T	D	NR	Pts	Quot
1	Punjab	3	2	0	0	1	0	16	1.466
2	Haryana	3	1	1	0	1	0	9	1.102
3	Himachal Pradesh	3	1	1	0	1	0	8	1.006
4	Tripura	3	0	2	0	1	0	1	0.581

Updated to match(es) played on 6 March 2022. Source: ESPN Cricinfo

Advances to Quarter-final

== Fixtures ==
=== Round 1 ===
17–20 February 2022
Scorecard

Himachal Pradesh	v	Punjab
354 (96 overs); Ankit Kalsi 88 (131); Baltej Singh 5/61 (22 overs)		526 (113 overs); Prabhsimran Singh 123 (138); Arpit Guleria 4/111 (25 overs)
402/8 (115.4 overs); Akash Vasisht 140 (196); Mayank Markande 3/103 (27.4 overs)

Match drawn
Arun Jaitley Stadium, Delhi
Umpires: Satrajit Lahiri and Sundaram Ravi
Player of the match: Akash Vasisht (Himachal Pradesh)

- Punjab won the toss and elected to field.
- Prabhsimran Singh (Punjab) made his first-class debut.
- Prabhsimran Singh (Punjab) scored his maiden century in first-class cricket.

17–20 February 2022
Scorecard

Haryana	v	Tripura
556 (155.3 overs); Yashu Sharma 129 (247); Sankar Paul 5/141 (31.3 overs)		436 (159 overs); Bishal Ghosh 159 (401); Jayant Yadav 6/111 (55 overs)
81/1 (20 overs); Shubham Rohilla 50* (60); Rahil Shah 1/29 (9 overs)

Match drawn
Palam A Stadium, Delhi
Umpires: Mukund Mandale and Navdeep Singh
Player of the match: Nishant Sindhu (Haryana)

- Tripura won the toss and elected to field.
- Anshul Kamboj, Kapil Hooda, Nishant Sindhu, Yuvraj Singh (Haryana) and Sankar Paul (Tripura) all made their first-class debuts.

=== Round 2 ===
24–27 February 2022
Scorecard

Himachal Pradesh	v	Tripura
365 (108.4 overs); Ankit Kalsi 147 (271); Rahil Shah 3/50 (22 overs)		202 (68.5 overs); KB Pawan 34 (113); Mayank Dagar 5/55 (21.2 overs)
		133 (45.4 overs) (f/o); Rajat Dey 49 (101); Mayank Dagar 4/30 (13.4 overs)

Himachal Pradesh won by an innings and 30 runs
Arun Jaitley Stadium, Delhi
Umpires: Prabhakar Rao and Navdeep Singh
Player of the match: Ankit Kalsi (Himachal Pradesh)

- Himachal Pradesh won the toss and elected to bat.
- Amit Ali (Tripura) made his first-class debut.

24–27 February 2022
Scorecard

Punjab	v	Haryana
444 (111 overs); Mandeep Singh 159* (289); Aman Kumar 4/88 (21 overs)		282 (88.5 overs); Himanshu Rana 149 (244); Baltej Singh 4/57 (22.5 overs)
45/0 (8.5 overs); Prabhsimran Singh 25* (29)		203 (59.5 overs) (f/o); Nishant Sindhu 57 (106); Abhishek Sharma 3/15 (4.5 overs)

Punjab won by 10 wickets
Palam A Stadium, Delhi
Umpires: Saurabh Dhote and Satrajit Lahiri
Player of the match: Mandeep Singh (Punjab)

- Haryana won the toss and elected to field.
- Mayank Shandilya and Nitesh Hooda (Haryana) both made their first-class debuts.

=== Round 3 ===
3–6 March 2022
Scorecard

Tripura	v	Punjab
127 (54.4 overs); KB Pawan 59 (128); Baltej Singh 5/33 (13.4 overs)		120 (37.4 overs); Anmol Malhotra 30 (59); Manisankar Murasingh 6/48 (15 overs)
232 (65.5 overs); Manisankar Murasingh 85 (91); Arshdeep Singh 5/33 (20 overs)		240/4 (66 overs); Mandeep Singh 97* (160); Manisankar Murasingh 1/43 (19 overs)

Punjab won by 6 wickets
Arun Jaitley Stadium, Delhi
Umpires: Saurabh Dhote and Sundaram Ravi
Player of the match: Mandeep Singh (Punjab)

- Punjab won the toss and elected to field.

3–6 March 2022
Scorecard

Haryana	v	Himachal Pradesh
302 (106.5 overs); Himanshu Rana 129 (207); Sidharth Sharma 4/57 (24 overs)		184 (45.5 overs); Amit Kumar 56 (72); Amit Rana 5/58 (16 overs)
320/9d (76.1 overs); Yashu Sharma 55 (50); Akash Vasisht 4/58 (17.1 overs)		157 (40.4 overs); Ankit Kalsi 59 (74); Amit Rana 4/34 (16 overs)

Haryana won by 281 runs
Palam A Stadium, Delhi
Umpires: Mukund Mandale and Prabhakar Rao
Player of the match: Himanshu Rana (Haryana)

- Haryana won the toss and elected to bat.
- Shubham Arora and Vinay Galetiya (Himachal Pradesh) both made their first-class debuts.
