= 2021–22 Vijay Hazare Trophy =

Indian cricket tournament

- Dates: 8 – 26 December 2021
- Administrator(s): BCCI
- Cricket format: List A cricket
- Tournament format(s): Round-robin and Playoff format
- Host(s): India
- Champions: Himachal Pradesh (1st title)
- Runners-up: Tamil Nadu
- Participants: 38
- Matches: 105
- Most runs: Ruturaj Gaikwad (603) (Maharashtra)
- Most wickets: Yash Thakur (18) (Vidarbha)

The 2021–22 Vijay Hazare Trophy was the 29th edition of the Vijay Hazare Trophy, an annual List A cricket tournament in India. It was played from 8 December 2021, and finished on 26 December 2021. Mumbai were the defending champions.

Originally, the tournament was scheduled to start on 23 February 2022, but was later preponed to 1 December 2021 and then postponed to 8 December 2021. The teams were initially divided into four groups, with nine teams each in Groups A and B, and ten each in Groups C and Plate. However, in August 2021, the Board of Control for Cricket in India (BCCI) announced that the tournament will be divided into six groups, with six teams in five Elite Groups and eight teams in the Plate Group. The winners of each Elite Group progressed directly to the quarter-finals, with the second-placed teams and the winner of the Plate Group playing in pre-quarters matches to determine the final eight teams.

Himachal Pradesh, Tamil Nadu, Saurashtra, Kerala and Services all won their respective groups to progress directly to the quarter-finals. Tripura won the Plate Group to progress to the preliminary quarter-finals. Vidarbha, Karnataka, Uttar Pradesh, Madhya Pradesh and Rajasthan also advanced to the preliminary quarter-finals, after finishing in second place in their respective groups.

On the first day of the quarter-finals, Himachal Pradesh beat Uttar Pradesh by five wickets, and Tamil Nadu beat Karnataka by 151 runs. In the other two quarter-final matches, Saurashtra beat Vidarbha by seven wickets, and Services beat Kerala, also by the margin of seven wickets.

In the first semi-final, Himachal Pradesh beat Services by 77 runs to advance to the final. In the second semi-final, Tamil Nadu beat Saurashtra by two wickets to place their berth in the final.

Himachal Pradesh won the final match against Tamil Nadu by 11 runs to clinch their maiden domestic title.

== League stage ==
=== Group A ===
Pos	Team	Pld	W	L	NR	Pts	NRR
1	Himachal Pradesh	5	3	2	0	12	0.551
2	Vidarbha	5	3	2	0	12	0.210
3	Andhra Pradesh	5	3	2	0	12	0.042
4	Odisha	5	3	2	0	12	−0.200
5	Gujarat	5	2	3	0	8	−0.284
6	Jammu and Kashmir	5	1	4	0	4	−0.280

Source: ESPN Cricinfo

Advanced to Quarter-final
Advanced to Preliminary quarter-final

=== Group B ===
Pos	Team	Pld	W	L	NR	Pts	NRR
1	Tamil Nadu	5	3	2	0	12	1.052
2	Karnataka	5	3	2	0	12	0.789
3	Bengal	5	3	2	0	12	−0.235
4	Pondicherry	5	3	2	0	12	−1.360
5	Baroda	5	2	3	0	8	0.290
6	Mumbai	5	1	4	0	4	−0.707

Source: ESPN Cricinfo

Advanced to Quarter-final
Advanced to Preliminary quarter-final

=== Group C ===
Pos	Team	Pld	W	L	NR	Pts	NRR
1	Saurashtra	5	5	0	0	20	1.461
2	Uttar Pradesh	5	3	2	0	12	0.708
3	Jharkhand	5	2	3	0	8	−0.278
4	Hyderabad	5	2	3	0	8	−0.358
5	Delhi	5	2	3	0	8	−0.630
6	Haryana	5	1	4	0	4	−0.896

Source: ESPN Cricinfo

Advanced to Quarter-final
Advanced to Preliminary quarter-final

=== Group D ===
Pos	Team	Pld	W	L	NR	Pts	NRR
1	Kerala	5	4	1	0	16	0.974
2	Madhya Pradesh	5	4	1	0	16	0.485
3	Maharashtra	5	4	1	0	16	0.104
4	Chhattisgarh	5	2	3	0	8	−0.141
5	Uttarakhand	5	1	4	0	4	−0.711
6	Chandigarh	5	0	5	0	0	−0.650

Source: ESPN Cricinfo

Advanced to Quarter-final
Advanced to Preliminary quarter-final

=== Group E ===
Pos	Team	Pld	W	L	T	NR	Pts	NRR
1	Services	5	4	1	0	0	16	0.073
2	Rajasthan	5	4	1	0	0	16	0.993
3	Punjab	5	3	1	1	0	14	1.086
4	Goa	5	1	3	1	0	6	−0.428
5	Assam	5	1	4	0	0	4	−1.226
6	Railways	5	1	4	0	0	4	−0.396

Source: ESPN Cricinfo

Advance to Quarter-final
Advance to Preliminary quarter-final

=== Plate Group ===
Pos	Team	Pld	W	L	NR	Pts	NRR
1	Tripura	5	5	0	0	20	2.642
2	Meghalaya	5	4	1	0	16	0.842
3	Bihar	5	3	2	0	12	1.431
4	Nagaland	5	3	2	0	12	−0.411
5	Mizoram	5	2	3	0	8	−0.413
6	Manipur	5	2	3	0	8	−0.781
7	Sikkim	5	1	4	0	4	−0.911
8	Arunachal Pradesh	5	0	5	0	0	−2.315

Source: ESPN Cricinfo

Advanced to Preliminary quarter-final

== Knockout stage ==
Preliminary QF
C2	Uttar Pradesh	237/5
D2	Madhya Pradesh	234
A2	Vidarbha	258/7
P1	Tripura	224
B2	Karnataka	204/2
E2	Rajasthan	199

Quarter-finals
A1	Himachal Pradesh	208/5
C2	Uttar Pradesh	207/9
D1	Kerala	175
E1	Services	176/3
C1	Saurashtra	151/3
A2	Vidarbha	150
B1	Tamil Nadu	354/8
B2	Karnataka	203

Semi-finals
A1	Himachal Pradesh	281/6
E1	Services	204
B1	Tamil Nadu	314/8
C1	Saurashtra	310/8

Final
A1	Himachal Pradesh	299/4
B1	Tamil Nadu	314

=== Preliminary quarter-finals ===
Pre Quarter-final 1
19 December 2021
Scorecard

Vidarbha; 258/7 (50 overs)	v	Tripura; 224 (49.2 overs)
Yash Rathod 57 (63); Manisankar Murasingh 2/41 (10 overs)		Bikramkumar Das 61 (100); Yash Thakur 4/45 (9.2 overs)

Vidarbha won by 34 runs
Sawai Mansingh Stadium, Jaipur
Umpires: Chettithody Shamshuddin and Virender Sharma

- Tripura won the toss and elected to field.

Pre-Quarter-final 2
19 December 2021
Scorecard

Rajasthan; 199 (49.2 overs)	v	Karnataka; 204/2 (43.4 overs)
Deepak Hooda 109 (109); Vijaykumar Vyshak 4/22 (7 overs)		Krishnamurthy Siddharth 85* (120); Kamlesh Nagarkoti 1/27 (6 overs)

Karnataka won by 8 wickets
KL Saini Ground, Jaipur
Umpires: Anil Chaudhary and Nitin Pandit

- Karnataka won the toss and elected to field.
- Abhinav Manohar (Karnataka) made his List A debut.

Pre-Quarter-final 3
19 December 2021
Scorecard

Madhya Pradesh; 234 (49.2 overs)	v	Uttar Pradesh; 237/5 (49.1 overs)
Shubham Sharma 83 (99); Yash Dayal 3/35 (10 overs)		Akshdeep Nath 78 (92); Avesh Khan 2/47 (10 overs)

Uttar Pradesh won by 5 wickets
Jaipuria Vidyalaya Ground, Jaipur
Umpires: Jayaraman Madanagopal and Rohan Pandit

- Uttar Pradesh won the toss and elected to field.

=== Quarter-finals ===
1st Quarter-final
21 December 2021
Scorecard

Uttar Pradesh; 207/9 (50 overs)	v	Himachal Pradesh; 208/5 (45.3 overs)
Rinku Singh 76 (102); Vinay Galetiya 3/19 (10 overs)		Prashant Chopra 99 (141); Shivam Mavi 3/34 (9 overs)

Himachal Pradesh won by 5 wickets
Sawai Mansingh Stadium, Jaipur
Umpires: Nitin Pandit and Sundaram Ravi

- Himachal Pradesh won the toss and elected to field.
- Sidharth Sharma (Himachal Pradesh) made his List A debut.

2nd Quarter-final
21 December 2021
Scorecard

Tamil Nadu; 354/8 (50 overs)	v	Karnataka; 203 (39 overs)
Narayan Jagadeesan 102 (101); Praveen Dubey 3/67 (10 overs)		Srinivas Sharath 43 (65); Ragupathy Silambarasan 4/36 (8 overs)

Tamil Nadu won by 151 runs
KL Saini Ground, Jaipur
Umpires: Chettithody Shamshuddin and Virender Sharma

- Karnataka won the toss and elected to field.

3rd Quarter-final
22 December 2021
Scorecard

Vidarbha; 150 (40.3 overs)	v	Saurashtra; 151/3 (29.5 overs)
Apoorv Wankhade 72 (69); Jaydev Unadkat 2/25 (9 overs)		Prerak Mankad 77* (72); Aditya Thakare 2/13 (8 overs)

Saurashtra won by 7 wickets
Sawai Mansingh Stadium, Jaipur
Umpires: Jayaraman Madanagopal and Rohan Pandit

- Saurashtra won the toss and elected to field.

4th Quarter-final
22 December 2021
Scorecard

Kerala; 175 (40.4 overs)	v	Services; 176/3 (30.5 overs)
Rohan Kunnummal 85 (106); Diwesh Pathania 3/19 (8 overs)		Ravi Chauhan 95 (90); Unnikrishnan Manukrishnan 2/23 (6 overs)

Services won by 7 wickets
KL Saini Ground, Jaipur
Umpires: Nitin Pandit and Chettithody Shamshuddin

- Services won the toss and elected to field.

=== Semi-finals ===
1st Semi-final
24 December 2021
Scorecard

Himachal Pradesh; 281/6 (50 overs)	v	Services; 204 (46.1 overs)
Rishi Dhawan 84 (77); Raj Bahadur 2/52 (10 overs)		Rajat Paliwal 55 (66); Rishi Dhawan 4/27 (8.1 overs)

Himachal Pradesh won by 77 runs
Sawai Mansingh Stadium, Jaipur
Umpires: Jayaraman Madanagopal and Sundaram Ravi

- Services won the toss and elected to field.

2nd Semi-final
24 December 2021
Scorecard

Saurashtra; 310/8 (50 overs)	v	Tamil Nadu; 314/8 (49.5 overs)
Sheldon Jackson 134 (125); Vijay Shankar 4/72 (10 overs)		Baba Aparajith 122 (124); Chetan Sakariya 5/62 (10 overs)

Tamil Nadu won by 2 wickets
KL Saini Ground, Jaipur
Umpires: Anil Chaudhary and Chettithody Shamshuddin

- Tamil Nadu won the toss and elected to field.

=== Final ===
Final
26 December 2021
Scorecard

Tamil Nadu; 314 (49.4 overs)	v	Himachal Pradesh; 299/4 (47.3 overs)
Dinesh Karthik 116 (103); Pankaj Jaswal 4/59 (9.4 overs)		Shubham Arora 136* (131); Baba Aparajith 1/45 (8 overs)

Himachal Pradesh won by 11 runs (VJD method)
Sawai Mansingh Stadium, Jaipur
Umpires: Anil Chaudhary and Chettithody Shamshuddin
Player of the match: Shubham Arora (Himachal Pradesh)

- Himachal Pradesh won the toss and elected to field.
- Bad light stopped play during Himachal Pradesh's innings.
- Himachal Pradesh were 11 runs ahead of the VJD par score of 288 runs from 47.3 overs.
