= 2024–25 Ranji Trophy Group D =

- Dates: 11 October 2024 – 2 February 2025
- Administrator: BCCI
- Cricket format: First-class cricket
- Tournament format: Round-robin then knockout
- Host: India
- Participants: 8
- Matches: 28

The 2024–25 Ranji Trophy is the 90th season of the Ranji Trophy, the premier first-class cricket tournament in India. It is contested by 38 teams, divided into four elite groups and a plate group, with eight teams in Group D. It took place between 11 October 2024 to 2 February 2025.

== Points table ==
Pos	Team	Pld	W	L	T	D	NR	Pts	Quot
1	Saurashtra	7	3	2	0	2	0	25	1.248
2	Tamil Nadu	7	3	1	0	3	0	25	1.670
3	Chandigarh	7	4	3	0	0	0	25	0.983
4	Delhi	7	2	2	0	3	0	21	0.872
5	Jharkhand	7	2	1	0	4	0	20	0.922
6	Railways	7	2	2	0	3	0	17	0.850
7	Chhattisgarh	7	0	2	0	5	0	11	1.110
8	Assam	7	0	3	0	4	0	6	0.624

Source: ESPNcricinfo

Advances to Quarter-final Relegated to Plate Group for next season

== Fixtures ==
=== Round 7 ===
30 January–2 February 2025
Scorecard

Jharkhand; 185 (53.2 overs) & 154 (48.4 overs)	v	Tamil Nadu; 106 (27.5 overs) & 189 (55.4 overs)

Jharkhand won by 44 runs
Keenan Stadium, Jamshedpur
Points: Jharkhand 6, Tamil Nadu 0

30 January–2 February 2025
Scorecard

Saurashtra; 474 (117 overs)	v	Assam; 164 (41 overs) & 118 (41.1 overs) (f/o)

Saurashtra won by an innings and 144 runs
Niranjan Shah Stadium, Rajkot
Points: Saurashtra 7, Assam 0

30 January–2 February 2025
Scorecard

Railways; 241 (67.4 overs) & 114 (30.5 overs)	v	Delhi; 374 (106.4 overs)

Delhi won by an innings and 19 runs
Arun Jaitley Cricket Stadium, Delhi
Points: Delhi 7, Railways 0

30 January–2 February 2025
Scorecard

Chandigarh; 283 (80.4 overs) & 222/4 (53 overs)	v	Chhattisgarh; 406 (124.3 overs)

Stumps, Day 3
Shaheed Veer Narayan Singh International Cricket Stadium, Raipur
