= M. D. Nidheesh =

Indian cricketer

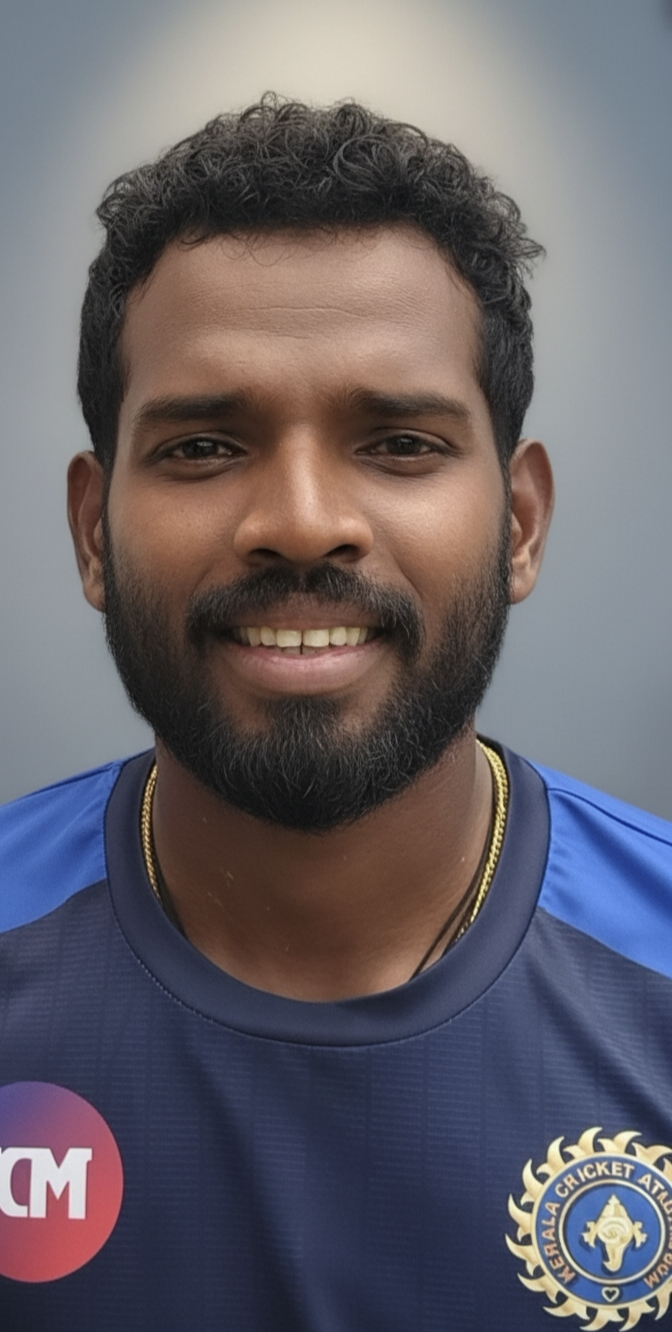

Personal information
- Full name: Mattakandathil Dineshan Nidheesh
- Born: 5 September 1991 (age 35) (Note: Discrepancy between sources on date of birth, CricketArchive records it as 5 September, ESPNcricinfo lists it as 5 May); Chembu, Kottayam, Kerala, India
- Height: 178 cm (5 ft 10 in)
- Batting: Right handed
- Bowling: Right-arm fast medium
- Role: Bowler

Domestic team information
- Years: Team
- 2015-present: Kerala
- 2018: Mumbai Indians

Career statistics
| Competition | FC | LA | T20 |
|---|---|---|---|
| Matches | 42 | 28 | 18 |
| Runs scored | 433 | 90 | 20 |
| Batting average | 10.06 | 7.50 | 10.00 |
| 100s/50s | 0/0 | 0/0 | 0/0 |
| Top score | 34 | 40 | 14 |
| Balls bowled | 6,087 | 1,236 | 360 |
| Wickets | 106 | 44 | 21 |
| Bowling average | 28.74 | 24.06 | 22.52 |
| 5 wickets in innings | 6 | 1 | 0 |
| 10 wickets in match | 1 | 0 | 0 |
| Best bowling | 7/88 | 5/49 | 4/30 |
| Catches/stumpings | 12/– | 2/– | 5/– |
- Source: ESPNcricinfo, 11 April 2025

Mattakandathil Dineshan Nidheesh (born 5 September 1991) is an Indian cricketer who represents Kerala in domestic cricket. He is a right-handed batsman and right-arm medium-fast bowler.

== Domestic career ==
Nidheesh made his first class debut for Kerala in the 2015–16 Ranji Trophy on 21 January 2015 against Tripura. He took 14 wickets from the six matches he played in the 2017-18 Ranji Trophy becoming Kerala's fourth highest wicket taker in the season.

He made his List A debut for Kerala in the 2017–18 Vijay Hazare Trophy on 11 February 2018 against Tripura.

In August 2018, he was one of eight players that were fined by the Kerala Cricket Association, after showing dissent against Kerala's captain, Sachin Baby.

His maiden 5-wicket haul (6 for 88) came against Himachal Pradesh on the 2018-19 Ranji Trophy. His career best performance (7 for 88) to date was against Punjab on the 2019-20 Ranji Trophy.

He made his Twenty20 debut for Kerala in the 2018–19 Syed Mushtaq Ali Trophy on 21 February 2019 against Manipur.

He took his maiden five-wicket haul in List A during the 2021-22 Vijay Hazare Trophy against Maharashtra. He was Kerala's highest wicket-taker in the season with 11 wickets from six matches.

== Indian Premier League ==
Nidheesh had earlier attended a trial camp of Kochi Tuskers Kerala but he failed to get a contract. Following an impressive 2017-18 Ranji Trophy season he was bought by the Mumbai Indians for 20 lakhs INR in the 2018 IPL auction.
