= Aayush Pandey =

Indian cricketer (born 2003)

Ayush Shashi Kanth pandey
Personal information
- Full name: Ayush pandey
- Born: 19 September 2003 (age 23); Patna,Bihar
- Batting: Left-handed
- Role: Opening batsman

Domestic team information
- Years: Team
- 2022–present: Chhattisgarh

Career statistics
Competition	FC	LA	T20
Matches	25	6	12
Runs scored	1705	268	141
Batting average	41.58	44.66	11.75
100s/50s	5/5	/2	0/1
Top score	211	86	37
Catches/stumpings	20/	2/	3/-
- Source: cricinfo, 18 November 2026

Ayush Pandey (born 19 September 2003) is an Indian cricketer, who plays as an opening batsman. He plays for Chhattisgarh in domestic cricket

== Career ==
Pandey made his first-class debut on 13 December 2022 in the 2022–23 Ranji Trophy In November 2024, during the 2024–25 Ranji Trophy, Pandey scored his maiden first-class double century, making 211 runs off 401 balls against Assam at Nava Raipur. In June 2026, Pandey was named in the India A cricket team squad for their series against Sri Lanka A, becoming the first cricketer from Chhattisgarh to earn an India A call-up. He made his India A debut on 25 June 2026 in the first unofficial Test against Sri Lanka A at Galle, scoring 25 and 38 runs across the two innings.
