= Sunil Roul =

Indian cricketer (born 1998)

Personal information
- Full name: Sunil Kumar Sarada Prasad Roul
- Born: 14 October 1998 (age 28); Cuttack, Odisha, India
- Batting: Right-handed
- Bowling: Right arm medium fast
- Source: Cricinfo, 10 January 2021

Sunil Roul (born 14 October 1998) is an Indian cricketer. He made his Twenty20 debut on 10 January 2021, for Odisha in the 2020–21 Syed Mushtaq Ali Trophy. He made his List A debut on 8 December 2021, for Odisha in the 2021–22 Vijay Hazare Trophy.
