= Srinivas Sharath =

Indian cricketer (born 1996)

Personal information
- Born: 1 March 1996 (age 30); Bangalore, Karnataka, India
- Source: Cricinfo, 14 December 2018

Srinivas Sharath (born 1 March 1996) is an Indian cricketer. He made his first-class debut for Karnataka in the 2018–19 Ranji Trophy on 14 December 2018. He made his List A debut on 8 December 2021, for Karnataka in the 2021–22 Vijay Hazare Trophy.
