= Pratyush Kumar =

Indian cricketer (born 1995)

Personal information
- Born: 1 July 1995 (age 31)
- Source: Cricinfo, 2 March 2019

Pratyush Kumar (born 1 July 1995) is an Indian cricketer. He made his Twenty20 debut for Baroda in the 2018–19 Syed Mushtaq Ali Trophy on 2 March 2019. He made his List A debut on 8 December 2021, for Baroda in the 2021–22 Vijay Hazare Trophy. He made his first-class debut on 17 February 2022, for Baroda in the 2021–22 Ranji Trophy.
