= Arun Ogiral =

Indian cricketer

Personal information
- Full name: Arun Muralidhar Ogiral
- Born: 25 September 1942; Nagpur, Maharashtra, British India
- Died: 26 February 2004 (aged 61); Nagpur, Maharashtra, India
- Batting: Right-handed
- Bowling: Right-arm off-spin

Domestic team information
- Years: Team
- 1960-61 to 1976-77: Vidarbha
- 1967-68 to 1975-76: Central Zone

Career statistics
Competition	First-class
Matches	53
Runs scored	985
Batting average	13.87
100s/50s	0/2
Top score	73
Balls bowled	9069
Wickets	152
Bowling average	28.26
5 wickets in innings	8
10 wickets in match	1
Best bowling	8/39
Catches/stumpings	42/–
- Source: CricketArchive, 18 September 2017

Arun Muralidhar Ogiral (25 September 1942 – 26 February 2004) was an Indian cricketer who played first-class cricket for Vidarbha from 1960 to 1976.

A right-arm off-spin bowler and lower-order batsman, Ogiral holds the record for the best innings figures for Vidarbha: 8 for 39 against Madhya Pradesh in 1967–68. He was also selected six times to play for Central Zone. In Central Zone's innings loss to the touring West Indians in 1974-75 he took 5 for 186, including the wicket of Viv Richards caught behind.
