= Joshua Ozukum =

Indian cricketer (born 2000)

Joshua Ben Ozukum
Personal information
- Full name: Joshua Ben Ozukum
- Born: 4 August 2000 (age 26); Kolkata, West Bengal
- Source: ESPNcricinfo, 13 January 2021

Joshua Ben Ozukum (born 4 August 2000) is an Indian cricketer. He made his Twenty20 debut on 13 January 2021, for Nagaland in the 2020–21 Syed Mushtaq Ali Trophy. He made his List A debut on 21 February 2021, for Nagaland in the 2020–21 Vijay Hazare Trophy. He made his first-class debut for Nagaland in the 2022-23 Ranji Trophy on 13 December 2022.
