= 2024–25 Irani Cup =

Cricket match]

Mumbai	Rest of India
537	416
&
329/8d
- Match drawn. Mumbai won the Irani Cup through their first innings lead.
- Date: 1–5 October 2024
- Venue: Ekana Cricket Stadium, Lucknow
- Player of the match: Sarfaraz Khan (Mumbai)
- Umpires: Saiyed Khalid and Akshay Totre

The 2024–25 Irani Cup was the 61st edition of the Irani Cup, a first-class cricket tournament in India, organized by the Board of Control for Cricket in India (BCCI). It was played as a one-off match between Mumbai, the winners of the 2023–24 Ranji Trophy, and a Rest of India cricket team.

It took place from 1 to 5 October 2024 in Lucknow. The tournament was part of the 2024 Indian domestic cricket season, announced by the BCCI in June 2024.

Rest of India were the defending champions.

The one-off match was originally scheduled to be held in Mumbai, but it was moved to Lucknow to guard against weather interruptions, with Mumbai going through an extended monsoon.

== Squads ==
Mumbai	Rest of India
Captain
Ajinkya Rahane	Ruturaj Gaikwad
Batters
Shreyas Iyer; ~~Musheer Khan~~; Prithvi Shaw; Sarfaraz Khan*; Siddhesh Lad; Suryansh Shedge; Ayush Mhatre	Abhimanyu Easwaran; Ricky Bhui; Devdutt Padikkal; Shashwat Rawat; Sai Sudharsan
Wicket-Keepers
Hardik Tamore; Sidhaant Addhatrao	Dhruv Jurel*; Ishan Kishan
All-Rounders
Shardul Thakur; Shams Mulani; Tanush Kotian	Manav Suthar; Saransh Jain; Rahul Chahar
Bowlers
Himanshu Singh; Mohit Avasthi; Juned Khan; Royston Dias	Khaleel Ahmed; Yash Dayal*; Prasidh Krishna; Mukesh Kumar

== Match ==
1–5 October 2024
Scorecard

Mumbai	v	Rest of India
537 (141 overs); Sarfaraz Khan 222* (286); Mukesh Kumar 5/110 (30 overs)		416 (110 overs); Abhimanyu Easwaran 191 (292); Mohit Avasthi 2/97 (22 overs)
329/8d (78 overs); Tanush Kotian 114* (150); Saransh Jain 6/121 (28 overs)

Match drawn
Ekana Cricket Stadium, Lucknow
Umpires: Saiyed Khalid and Akshay Totre
Player of the match: Sarfaraz Khan (Mumbai)

- Rest of India won the toss and elected to field.
- Mohammad Juned Khan and Ayush Mhatre (Mumbai) both made their first-class debuts.
