= Harsh Dubey =

Indian cricketer (born 2002)

Personal information
- Full name: Harsh Surendra Dubey
- Born: 23 July 2002 (age 24); Pune, Maharashtra, India
- Batting: Left-handed
- Bowling: Slow left-arm orthodox
- Role: Bowling All-rounder

International information
- National side: India (2026–present)
- ODI debut (cap 261): 13 June 2026 v Afghanistan
- Last ODI: 20 June 2026 v Afghanistan

Domestic team information
- Years: Team
- 2020/21–present: Vidarbha
- 2025-present: Sunrisers Hyderabad

Career statistics
Competition	FC	LA	T20
Matches	27	30	38
Runs scored	1,026	296	177
Batting average	25.65	26.90	14.75
100s/50s	0/9	0/2	0/1
Top score	84	63	53*
Balls bowled	6,086	1,493	696
Wickets	133	31	34
Bowling average	23.26	37.87	25.85
5 wickets in innings	9	0	0
10 wickets in match	2	–	–
Best bowling	6/36	4/20	3/12
Catches/stumpings	9/–	7/–	13/–
- Source: ESPNcricinfo, 24 May 2026

Harsh Dubey (born 23 July 2002) is an Indian cricketer who plays for Vidarbha in domestic cricket and Sunrisers Hyderabad in the Indian Premier League. He made his ODI debut on 13 June 2026 against Afghanistan.

With 69 wickets and 476 runs, Dubey won the award for the player of the tournament in the 2024–25 Ranji Trophy, which Vidarbha won.

== Early life ==
Harsh Dubey was born on 23 July 2002 in Pune, Maharashtra. He represent the Vidarbha Cricket Association at various age-group levels, including the Under-19 and Under-23 squads, before making his senior debut.

== Domestic career ==
Dubey made his List A debut for Vidarbha on 28 February 2021, in the 2020–21 Vijay Hazare Trophy. He later made his Twenty20 debut on 4 November 2021, against Andhra in the 2021–22 Syed Mushtaq Ali Trophy.

His career trajectory shifted significantly during the 2024–25 Ranji Trophy. Dubey scripted history by claiming 69 wickets in a single season, the highest ever for a bowler in that competition's history, leading Vidarbha to their third title. For his all-round performance, including over 400 runs, he was named the Player of the Tournament.

== Indian Premier League ==
Following his domestic success, Dubey was signed by Sunrisers Hyderabad (SRH) as a replacement player during the 2025 IPL season. He made his IPL debut on 5 May 2025 against Delhi Capitals at the Rajiv Gandhi International Cricket Stadium. In his debut season, he impressed by taking five wickets in just three matches at an average of 19.60, with his victims including Virat Kohli and Mitchell Marsh. In the 2026 IPL auction, SRH retained him for ₹30 lakh. During the 2026 season, he became a regular in the playing XI, notably taking 2/18 against Lucknow Super Giants and scoring a quickfire 9* off 3 balls against Kolkata Knight Riders.

== India A career ==
In 2025, Dubey was selected for the India A squad for the Rising Stars Asia Cup held in Qatar, where he scored his maiden T20 half-century. His consistent domestic performance led to his maiden call-up to the India A team for the shadow tour of South Africa in early 2026, where he scored a career-best 84 in a first-class fixture.

== International career ==
Dubey got his maiden International call up for the test and the ODI series vs Afghanistan.
