= Kartik Biswal =

Indian cricketer (born 1997)

Personal information
- Born: 30 June 1997 (age 29); Bhubaneswar, Odisha, India
- Source: ESPNcricinfo, 20 February 2021

Kartik Biswal (born 30 June 1997) is an Indian cricketer. He made his List A debut on 20 February 2021, for Odisha in the 2020–21 Vijay Hazare Trophy.
