= Sidharth Sharma =

Indian cricketer (1994–2023)

Personal information
- Born: 23 October 1994; Una, Himachal Pradesh, India
- Died: 12 January 2023 (aged 28); Vadodara, Gujarat, India
- Batting: Right-handed
- Bowling: Right arm medium
- Source: Cricinfo, 1 November 2017

Sidharth Sharma (23 October 1994 – 12 January 2023) was an Indian cricketer. He made his first-class debut for Himachal Pradesh in the 2017–18 Ranji Trophy on 1 November 2017. He made his List A debut on 21 December 2021, for Himachal Pradesh in the 2021–22 Vijay Hazare Trophy.

Sharma died after a brief illness in Vadodara, Gujarat on 12 January 2023, at the age of 28.
