= Ekant Sen =

Indian cricketer (born 1995)

Personal information
- Born: 21 June 1995 (age 31); Hamirpur, Himachal Pradesh, India
- Batting: Right-handed
- Bowling: Right arm medium
- Source: ESPNcricinfo, 4 March 2017

Ekant Sen (born 21 June 1995) is an Indian cricketer. He made his List A debut for Himachal Pradesh in the 2016–17 Vijay Hazare Trophy on 4 March 2017. He made his first-class debut for Himachal Pradesh in the 2018–19 Ranji Trophy on 1 November 2018. He made his Twenty20 debut for Himachal Pradesh in the 2018–19 Syed Mushtaq Ali Trophy on 21 February 2019.
