= Sameer Choudhary =

Indian cricketer (born 1999)

Personal information
- Born: 19 December 1999 (age 26); Meerut, Uttar Pradesh, India
- Batting: Right-handed
- Bowling: Right arm off break
Medal record
Men's cricket
Representing India
ACC U19 Asia Cup
Winner	2018 Bangladesh
- Source: Cricinfo, 11 November 2019

Sameer Choudhary (born 19 December 1999) is an Indian cricketer. He made his Twenty20 debut on 11 November 2019, for Uttar Pradesh in the 2019–20 Syed Mushtaq Ali Trophy. He made his List A debut on 20 February 2021, for Uttar Pradesh in the 2020–21 Vijay Hazare Trophy.
