= Mohit Avasthi =

Indian cricketer (born 1992)

Personal information
- Full name: Mohit Anil Avasthi
- Born: 18 November 1992 (age 33)
- Batting: Right-handed
- Bowling: Right arm medium fast
- Source: ESPNcricinfo, 1 March 2021

Mohit Avasthi (born 18 November 1992) is an Indian cricketer. He plays as right arm medium pace bowler for Mumbai in domestic cricket.

He made his List A debut on 1 March 2021, for Mumbai in the 2020–21 Vijay Hazare Trophy. He made his Twenty20 debut on 4 November 2021, for Mumbai in the 2021–22 Syed Mushtaq Ali Trophy. He made his first-class debut on 17 February 2022, for Mumbai in the 2021–22 Ranji Trophy.
