= Ninad Rathva =

Indian cricketer (born 1999)

Personal information
- Full name: Ninad Ashvinkumar Rathva
- Born: 10 March 1999 (age 27); Vadodara, Gujarat, India
- Height: 1.72 m (5 ft 8 in)
- Batting: Left-handed
- Bowling: Slow left-arm orthodox
- Role: All rounder
- Source: ESPNcricinfo, 17 November 2017

Ninad Rathva (born 10 March 1999) is an Indian cricketer. He made his first-class debut for Baroda in the 2017–18 Ranji Trophy on 17 November 2017, where he scored a century in the first innings. He made his Twenty20 debut for Baroda in the 2017–18 Syed Mushtaq Ali Trophy on 21 January 2018. He made his List A debut for Baroda in the 2017–18 Vijay Hazare Trophy on 14 February 2018.
