= Prashant Chopra =

Indian cricketer (born 1992)

Personal information
- Born: 7 October 1992 (age 34); Shimla, Himachal Pradesh, India
- Nickname: Shanu
- Batting: Right-handed
- Bowling: Legbreak googly

Domestic team information
- Years: Team
- 2012–present: Himachal Pradesh
- 2018–2019: Rajasthan Royals

Career statistics
Competition	FC	LA	T20
Matches	61	92	60
Runs scored	3,931	3,400	1,716
Batting average	41.81	39.53	33.64
100s/50s	10/16	6/19	0/11
Top score	338	159	99*
Balls bowled	1273	307	66
Wickets	19	13	2
Bowling average	43.94	21.46	43.00
5 wickets in innings	0	0	0
10 wickets in match	0	0	0
Best bowling	4/82	4/20	2/18
Catches/stumpings	69/–	65/1	34/1
- Source: ESPNcricinfo, 5 January 2023

Prashant Chopra (born 7 October 1992) is an Indian cricketer. He was in the 2012 ICC Under-19 Cricket World Cup champion India Team. Chopra represents Himachal Pradesh in the Ranji Trophy and holds the record of most runs by a Himachal Pradesh batsman in a Ranji Trophy season.

== Career ==
In October 2017 in the 2017–18 Ranji Trophy, he made 271 not out on the opening day in the fixture between Himachal Pradesh and Punjab. This was the second-most runs scored in one day in the Ranji Trophy and the joint-highest score made by a player for Himachal Pradesh. Chopra went on to make 338, the tenth-highest total by a batsman in the Ranji Trophy and the first triple-century by a batsman for Himachal Pradesh. He was the leading run-scorer for Himachal Pradesh in the 2017–18 Ranji Trophy, with 581 runs in five matches.

In January 2018, he was bought by the Rajasthan Royals in the 2018 IPL auction. In July 2018, he was named in the squad for India Green for the 2018–19 Duleep Trophy.

He was the leading run-scorer for Himachal Pradesh in the 2018–19 Vijay Hazare Trophy, with 329 runs in six matches. In October 2018, he was named in India B's squad for the 2018–19 Deodhar Trophy. The following month, he scored his 3,000th run in first-class cricket, batting for Himachal Pradesh against Bengal in the 2018–19 Ranji Trophy.

He was released by the Rajasthan Royals ahead of the 2020 IPL auction.
