= Vidarbha cricket team =

Indian cricket team

Personnel
- Captain: Akshay Wadkar (FC); Harsh Dubey (LA & T20)
- Coach: Usman Ghani
- Owner: Vidarbha Cricket Association

Team information
- Founded: 1933
- Home ground: Vidarbha Cricket Association Stadium
- Capacity: 45,000

History
- First-class debut: Ceylon in 1933 at Vidarbha Cricket Association Ground, Nagpur
- Ranji Trophy wins: 3
- Irani Cup wins: 3
- Vijay Hazare Trophy wins: 1
- Syed Mushtaq Ali Trophy wins: 0
- Official website: VCA

The Vidarbha cricket team is an Indian domestic cricket team plays in the India's domestic first-class cricket competition Ranji Trophy and limited-overs Vijay Hazare Trophy and Syed Mushtaq Ali Trophy. It represents the Vidarbha region of eastern Maharashtra. In December 2017, they reached the final of the Ranji Trophy for the first time in their history, after they beat Karnataka by 5 runs in the semi-finals of the 2017–18 Ranji Trophy tournament. In the final, they beat Delhi by 9 wickets to win their first Ranji Trophy. In the 2018-19 Ranji Trophy, Vidarbha successfully defended the crown by defeating Saurashtra by 78 runs in the final played at Nagpur. They won the third title in 2024-25 Ranji Trophy season.

== History ==
Vidarbha cricket team, formerly known as Central Provinces and Berar, played 15 first-class matches between 1933 and 1949, including 11 Ranji Trophy matches. As Vidarbha they first played first-class cricket in the 1957–58 season, competing against the other Central Zone teams until 2001-02, after which the Ranji Trophy was no longer contested on a zonal basis. Before the 2017-18 season, Vidarbha's best seasons were 1970-71 and 1995–96, when it reached the quarter-finals of the Ranji Trophy and 2002–03 and 2011–12, when it reached the semi-finals of the Plate Group. Up to the start of the 2017-18 season, Vidarbha had played 259 first-class matches, with 41 wins, 89 losses and 129 draws.

Vidarbha's main home ground was always the Vidarbha Cricket Association Ground in Nagpur until 2009, when it was superseded by the newly developed Vidarbha Cricket Association Stadium at Jamtha in Nagpur.

Vidarbha's record score is 237 by Ganesh Satish against Andhra in 2019-20. The best bowling figures in an innings are 8 for 39 by Arun Ogiral against Madhya Pradesh in 1967-68, and the best bowling figures in a match are 13 for 162 by Akshay Wakhare against Gujarat in 2014-15.

== Honours ==
- Ranji Trophy
  - Winners (3): 2017–18, 2018–19, 2024–25
  - Runners-up: 2023–24
- Irani Trophy
  - Winners (3): 2017–18, 2018–19, 2024-25
- Vijay Hazare Trophy
  - Winners (1): 2025–26
  - Runners-up (1): 2024–25

== Notable past players ==
Players from Vidarbha who have played Test cricket for India, along with year of Test debut:

- Umesh Yadav (2011)

Players from Vidarbha who have played ODI but not Test cricket for India, along with year of ODI debut :

- Prashant Vaidya (1995) (Also played for Bengal)
- Faiz Fazal (2016)
- Harsh Dubey (2026)

Players from Vidarbha who have played T20I but not Test or ODI cricket for India, along with year of T20I debut :

- Jitesh Sharma (2023)
- Yash Thakur (2026)

India Capped players from other states who have played for Vidarbha, along with year:

- Chandu Sarwate (1968)
- Lalchand Rajput (1996-1998)
- Hemang Badani (2011-2013)
- Sairaj Bahutule (2011-2012)
- Shiv Sunder Das (2011-2012)
- Subramaniam Badrinath (2014-2016)
- Wasim Jaffer (2015-2020)
- Ambati Rayudu (2017)
- Karn Sharma (2017-2018)
- Karun Nair (2023-2025)

== Players ==
=== Current squad ===
Coach: Usman Ghani

Players with international caps are listed in bold

Name	Birth date	Batting style	Bowling style	Notes
Batters
Aman Mokhade	16 January 2001 (age 25)	Right-handed	Right-arm legbreak	
Yash Rathod	16 May 2000 (age 26)	Left-handed	Slow left-arm orthodox	
Dhruv Shorey	5 June 1992 (age 34)	Right-handed	Right-arm offbreak	
Atharva Taide	26 April 2000 (age 26)	Left-handed	Slow left-arm orthodox	
Ravikumar Samarth	22 January 1993 (age 33)	Right-handed	Right-arm offbreak	
Danish Malewar	8 October 2003 (age 23)	Right-handed	Right-arm leg break	Plays for **Mumbai Indians** in IPL
Satyam Bhoyar	12 March 2002 (age 24)	Right-handed	Right-arm offbreak	
Varun Bisht	1 May 2004 (age 22)	Right-handed	Right-arm offbreak	
Shubham Dubey	27 August 1994 (age 32)	Left-handed	Right-arm offbreak	
All-rounder
Mandar Mahale	17 November 2000 (age 26)	Left-handed	Right-arm offbreak	
Wicket-keepers
Akshay Wadkar	9 July 1994 (age 32)	Right-handed		**First-class Captain**
Rohit Binkar		Right-handed		
Vedant Jajoo	19 May 2002 (age 24)	Right-handed		
Spin Bowlers
Parth Rekhade	18 July 1999 (age 27)	Left-handed	Slow left-arm orthodox	
**Harsh Dubey**	23 July 2002 (age 24)	Left-handed	Slow left-arm orthodox	Plays for **Sunrisers Hyderabad** in IPL; **List A & Twenty20 Captain**
Yash Kadam	29 December 1999 (age 26)	Left-handed	Right-arm offbreak	
Fast-Bowlers
Nachiket Bhute	1 November 1999 (age 27)	Right-handed	Right-arm medium	
Darshan Nalkande	4 October 1998 (age 28)	Right-handed	Right-arm medium-fast	
**Yash Thakur**	28 December 1998 (age 27)	Right-handed	Right-arm medium	Plays for **Punjab Kings** in IPL
Praful Hinge	18 January 2002 (age 24)	Right-handed	Right-arm medium-fast	Plays for **Sunrisers Hyderabad** in IPL
Rajneesh Gurbani	28 January 1993 (age 33)	Right-handed	Right-arm medium-fast	
Saurabh Dubey	23 January 1998 (age 28)	Right-handed	Right-arm medium-fast	Plays for **Kolkata Knight Riders** in IPL

Updated as on 17 November 2026

== Coaching staff ==
- Head coach: Usman Ghani
- Batting coach: Yusuf Pathan
- Bowling coach: Subroto Banerjee
- Under-19s coach: Usman Ghani
- Video analyst: Aniruddha Deshpande
- Trainer: Amiykumar Mohanty
- Physio: Dr Niraj Karamchandani
