= Atharva Taide =

Indian cricketer (born 2000)

Personal information
- Born: 26 April 2000 (age 26); Akola, Maharashtra, India
- Batting: Left-handed
- Bowling: Left-arm orthodox
- Role: Top order batsman

Domestic team information
- Years: Team
- 2018-present: Vidarbha (squad no. 14)
- 2023–2024: Punjab Kings
- 2025: Sunrisers Hyderabad

Career statistics
| Competition | FC | LA | T20 |
|---|---|---|---|
| Matches | 33 | 35 | 52 |
| Runs scored | 1,825 | 1,093 | 1,492 |
| Batting average | 34.43 | 35.25 | 30.44 |
| 100s/50s | 4/9 | 2/6 | 0/6 |
| Top score | 138 | 164* | 97 |
| Balls bowled | 157 | 369 | 168 |
| Wickets | 1 | 9 | 11 |
| Bowling average | 95.00 | 33.22 | 15.18 |
| 5 wickets in innings | 0 | 0 | 0 |
| 10 wickets in match | 0 | – | – |
| Best bowling | 1/9 | 2/8 | 2/0 |
| Catches/stumpings | 35/– | 13/– | 26/– |
- Source: ESPNcricinfo, 20 March 2025

Atharva Taide (born 26 April 2000) is an Indian cricketer who plays for Vidarbha in domestic cricket and previously appeared for Punjab Kings in the Indian Premier League.

He made his List A debut for Vidarbha in the 2018–19 Vijay Hazare Trophy on 20 September 2018. In December 2018, he was named in India's team for the 2018 ACC Emerging Teams Asia Cup. He made his first-class debut for Vidarbha in the 2018–19 Ranji Trophy on 22 December 2018. He made his Twenty20 debut for Vidarbha in the 2018–19 Syed Mushtaq Ali Trophy on 21 February 2019. In February 2022, he was bought by the Punjab Kings in the auction for the 2022 Indian Premier League tournament.

Opening for Vidarbha in the final of the Cooch Vihar Trophy, Atharva played an innings of 320 to win the match for Vidarbha, equaling Yuvraj Singh's record. In the final of the 2019 Irani Trophy, Atharva played a match-winning 72. Atharva's highest score in List A cricket is 164 not out against Andhra Pradesh in the Vijay Hazare Trophy on 9 December 2021. He was a member of the winning team of the Under-23 season 2019–20. Atharva was Vidarbha's captain for the Under-19 Coochbehar Trophy.
