= Aditya Thakare =

Indian cricketer (born 1998)

Personal information
- Full name: Aditya Shailesh Thakare
- Born: 8 November 1998 (age 27); Akola, Maharashtra, India
- Batting: Right-handed
- Bowling: Right-arm medium
- Source: ESPNcricinfo, 29 December 2017

Aditya Thakare (born 8 November 1998) is an Indian cricketer who represents Vidarbha.

He made his first-class debut for Vidarbha in the 2017–18 Ranji Trophy on 29 December 2017. During the 2018 Under-19 Cricket World Cup he was added to the India's squad as cover for Ishan Porel, who suffered an injury. He made his List A debut for Vidarbha in the 2018–19 Vijay Hazare Trophy on 26 September 2018. In November 2019, he replaced the unwell Kamlesh Nagarkoti in India's squad for the 2019 ACC Emerging Teams Asia Cup.
