= Nachiket Bhute =

Indian cricketer (born 1999)

Personal information
- Full name: Nachiket Narendra Bhute
- Born: 1 November 1999 (age 27); Nagpur, Maharashtra, India
- Source: ESPNcricinfo, 11 January 2021

Nachiket Bhute (born 1 November 1999) is an Indian cricketer. He made his Twenty20 debut on 11 January 2021, for Vidarbha in the 2020–21 Syed Mushtaq Ali Trophy. He made his List A debut on 26 February 2021, for Vidarbha in the 2020–21 Vijay Hazare Trophy.
