= Vinay Galetiya =

Indian cricketer (born 1992)

Personal information
- Full name: Vinay Kishore Singh Galetiya
- Born: 10 December 1992 (age 33); Hamirpur, Himachal Pradesh, India
- Batting: Right-handed
- Bowling: Right-arm medium
- Role: Bowler

Domestic team information
- Years: Team
- Himachal Pradesh
- Source: ESPNcricinfo, 29 January 2017

Vinay Galetiya (born 10 December 1992) is an Indian cricketer. He made his Twenty20 debut for Himachal Pradesh in the 2014–15 Syed Mushtaq Ali Trophy on 5 April 2015. He made his List A debut for Himachal Pradesh in the 2017–18 Vijay Hazare Trophy on 5 February 2018. He made his first-class debut on 3 March 2022, for Himachal Pradesh in the 2021–22 Ranji Trophy.
