= Amit Rana =

Indian cricketer (born 1995)

Personal information
- Born: 14 December 1995 (age 30); Rohtak, Haryana, India
- Batting: Right-handed
- Bowling: Right arm off break
- Role: Bowler

Domestic team information
- Years: Team
- 2017–present: Haryana
- Source: ESPNcricinfo, 26 February 2017

Amit Rana (born 14 December 1995) is an Indian cricketer. He made his List A debut for Haryana in the 2016–17 Vijay Hazare Trophy on 26 February 2017. He made his first-class debut for Haryana in the 2017–18 Ranji Trophy on 6 October 2017.
