= Akash Vasisht =

Indian cricketer (born 1994)

Personal information
- Full name: Akash Paramjeet Vasisht
- Born: 17 December 1994 (age 31); Kangra, Himachal Pradesh, India
- Batting: Left-handed
- Bowling: Slow left arm orthodox
- Role: Allrounder
- Source: ESPNcricinfo, 11 October 2015

Akash Vasisht (born 17 December 1994) is an Indian cricketer who plays for Himachal Pradesh.

Vasisht made his Twenty20 debut on 18 November 2019, for Himachal Pradesh in the 2019–20 Syed Mushtaq Ali Trophy. He made his List A debut on 21 February 2021, for Himachal Pradesh in the 2020–21 Vijay Hazare Trophy. In IPL 2023, Akash Vasisht was bought by the Rajasthan Royals at the Base price of 20 Lakhs.
