= Vishnu Solanki =

Indian cricketer

Personal information
- Full name: Vishnu Purshottam Solanki
- Born: 15 October 1992 (age 34); Vadodara, Gujarat, India
- Batting: Right-handed
- Bowling: Right arm off break
- Role: Middle-order-batter; Wicket-keeper

Domestic team information
- Years: Team
- 2013–present: Baroda (squad no. 9)
- Source: Cricinfo, 13 June 2022

Vishnu Purshottam Solanki (born 15 October 1992) is an Indian cricketer who represents Baroda in domestic cricket. He is a right-handed middle order batter and wicket-keeper who occasionally bowls right-arm offspin.

== Domestic career ==
Solanki made his List A debut for Baroda in the 2012-13 Vijay Hazare Trophy on 18 February 2013. He made his Twenty20 debut for the same side in the 2012-13 Syed Mushtaq Ali Trophy on 26 March 2013. His first-class debut came for Baroda in the 2014–15 Ranji Trophy on 6 February 2015.

In November 2017, he scored his maiden century in first-class cricket against Tripura in the 2017–18 Ranji Trophy. In July 2018, he was named in the squad for India Green for the 2018–19 Duleep Trophy. He was the leading run-scorer for Baroda in the 2018–19 Ranji Trophy, with 595 runs in eight matches.

He led Baroda to the semi-finals of the 2020-21 Syed Mushtaq Ali Trophy, hitting an unbeaten 71 off 46 balls in a must-win match against Haryana, clubbing 6, 4 and 6 off the last three balls to ensure victory.

Solanki hit a century against Chandigarh in the 2021-22 Ranji Trophy, two weeks after losing his newborn daughter. He decided to continue playing in the tournament despite losing his father during the match against Chandigarh.

== Personal life ==
Solanki became the father of a daughter on 11 February 2022. However, the infant died the next day. A fortnight later, he scored a century in Ranji Trophy, which he dedicated to his daughter. His father, Parshottam Solanki died on 27 February 2022, due to a heart attack after being hospitalised for two months.
