= Ankit Kalsi =

Indian cricketer (born 1993)

Personal information
- Born: 26 September 1993 (age 33); Una, Himachal Pradesh, India
- Batting: Left-handed
- Bowling: Slow left arm orthodox
- Source: ESPNcricinfo, 1 November 2015

Ankit Kalsi (born 26 September 1993) is an Indian cricketer who plays for Himachal Pradesh.

He made his List A debut on 27 February 2014, for Himachal Pradesh in the 2013–14 Vijay Hazare Trophy. He made his first-class debut for Himachal Pradesh against Services in 2014-15 Ranji Trophy season on 7 December 2014. In August 2019, he was named in the India Red team's squad for the 2019–20 Duleep Trophy. He scored a century and a half century in his Duleep Trophy debut.
