= Karan Lal =

Indian cricketer (born 2000)

Personal information
- Born: 19 October 2000 (age 26); Kharagpur, West Bengal, India
- Batting: Right-handed
- Bowling: Right-arm off break
- Role: All-rounder

Domestic team information
- Years: Team
- 2021–present: Bengal
- FC debut: 27 December 2022 Bengal v Nagaland
- LA debut: 23 November 2023 Bengal v Nagaland

Career statistics
| Competition | FC | LA | T20 |
|---|---|---|---|
| Matches | 11 | 15 | 24 |
| Runs scored | 314 | 180 | 457 |
| Batting average | 24.15 | 20.00 | 25.38 |
| 100s/50s | 0/1 | 0/1 | 0/2 |
| Top score | 52 | 66 | 94* |
| Balls bowled | 688 | 452 | 180 |
| Wickets | 12 | 12 | 13 |
| Bowling average | 31.50 | 30.08 | 13.69 |
| 5 wickets in innings | 1 | 0 | 0 |
| 10 wickets in match | 0 | 0 | 0 |
| Best bowling | 5/47 | 3/43 | 3/23 |
| Catches/stumpings | 2/– | 1/– | 10/– |
- Source: ESPNcricinfo, 27 April 2025

Karan Lal (Bengali: করণ লাল; born 19 October 2000) is an Indian cricketer. He made his Twenty20 debut on 4 November 2021, for Bengal in the 2021–22 Syed Mushtaq Ali Trophy.
