= Yash Thakur =

Indian cricketer (born 1998)

Personal information
- Full name: Yash Ravisingh Thakur
- Born: 28 December 1998 (age 27); Kolkata, West Bengal, India
- Bowling: Right-arm fast-medium
- Role: Bowler

International information
- National side: India (2026–present)
- Only T20I (cap 124): 25 July 2026 v Zimbabwe

Domestic team information
- Years: Team
- 2016/17–present: Vidarbha
- 2023–2024: Lucknow Super Giants
- 2025–present: Punjab Kings

Career statistics
Competition	FC	LA	T20
Matches	29	49	73
Runs scored	323	36	38
Batting average	11.53	2.57	6.33
100s/50s	0/0	0/0	0/0
Top score	33	6*	10
Balls bowled	4,220	2,348	1,491
Wickets	86	76	108
Bowling average	27.80	26.93	18.59
5 wickets in innings	1	1	2
10 wickets in match	0	0	0
Best bowling	5/44	5/53	5/16
Catches/stumpings	16/–	9/–	12/–
Medal record
Men's cricket
Representing India
Asian Games
Gold medal – first place	2026 Aichi–Nagoya
- Source: Cricinfo, 31 December 2025

Yash Thakur (born 28 December 1998) is an Indian cricketer. He plays for Vidarbha in domestic cricket and Punjab Kings in the Indian Premier League.

He made his List A debut for Vidarbha in the 2016–17 Vijay Hazare Trophy on 25 February 2017. He made his first-class debut for Vidarbha in the 2018–19 Ranji Trophy on 28 November 2018. He made his Twenty20 debut for Vidarbha in the 2018–19 Syed Mushtaq Ali Trophy on 21 February 2019. On 8 December 2021, on the opening day of the 2021–22 Vijay Hazare Trophy, Thakur took his first five-wicket haul in List A cricket.

He was bought by Lucknow Super Giants for 45 lakhs in the players auction ahead of 2023 IPL, and made his IPL debut on 3 April 2023 against Chennai Super Kings.

Yash Thakur became the first bowler of IPL 2024 to take five wickets in a match against Gujarat Titans at the Ekana Cricket Stadium.

== International career ==
In October 2026, Thakur earned his maiden call-up to the Indian One Day International squad for the final two matches of the series against New Zealand.
