= Karun Nair =

Indian cricketer

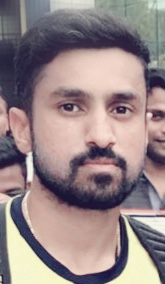

Personal information
- Full name: Karun Kaladharan Nair
- Born: 6 December 1991 (age 34); Jodhpur, Rajasthan, India
- Nickname: Kulla
- Height: 1.70 m (5 ft 7 in)
- Batting: Right-handed
- Bowling: Right-arm off break
- Role: Top-order batter

International information
- National side: India (2016–2025)
- Test debut (cap 287): 26 November 2016 v England
- Last Test: 31 July 2025 v England
- ODI debut (cap 212): 11 June 2016 v Zimbabwe
- Last ODI: 13 June 2016 v Zimbabwe
- ODI shirt no.: 69

Domestic team information
- Years: Team
- 2012–2023, 2025–present: Karnataka
- 2013: Royal Challengers Bangalore
- 2014–2015, 2022: Rajasthan Royals
- 2016–2017, 2025–present: Delhi Capitals
- 2018–2020: Kings XI Punjab
- 2023–2025: Vidarbha
- 2023–2024: Northamptonshire

Career statistics
Competition	Test	ODI	FC	LA
Matches	10	2	125	107
Runs scored	579	46	9277	3,128
Batting average	41.35	23.00	50.41	41.15
100s/50s	1/1	0/0	26/39	8/14
Top score	303*	39	328	163*
Balls bowled	12	–	1,563	976
Wickets	0	–	16	16
Bowling average	–	–	53.06	52.00
5 wickets in innings	–	–	0	0
10 wickets in match	–	–	0	0
Best bowling	–	–	2/10	2/16
Catches/stumpings	10/–	0/–	102/–	45/–
- Source: ESPNcricinfo, 8 October 2025

Karun Kaladharan Nair (born 6 December 1991) is an Indian international cricketer. He is a right-handed top order batter and occasional off break bowler. He is the second (Note: The first being Virender Sehwag) Indian batter to score a triple century in Test cricket. He plays for Karnataka in domestic cricket and Delhi Capitals in Indian Premier League.

== Early life ==
Karun was born on 6 December 1991 in Jodhpur, Rajasthan. His parents, Kaladharan Nair and Prema Nair, hail from Chengannur in the Alappuzha district of Kerala. Kaladharan, who is a mechanical engineer, lived in Jodhpur at the time of his son's birth and later moved with his family to Koramangala, Bangalore where he also worked on the sprinkler system at the M. Chinnaswamy Stadium. Nair's mother, Prema is a teacher at Chinmaya Vidyalaya, Bangalore. Karun has an elder sister, Shruthi Nair.

Born as a premature baby, Karun's parents were advised by the doctors to introduce their son to sports as part of the treatment for his weak lungs. Nair joined Koramangala Cricket Academy on 28 March 2001, a year after his family moved to Bengaluru and was coached under Shivanand. He studied at Chinmaya Vidyalaya, where his mother taught until fourth grade and switched to the Frank Anthony Public School for better cricketing opportunities. He studied Bachelor of Commerce at Jain University in Bangalore. He is fluent in several languages: English, Hindi, Malayalam, Kannada and Tamil. His mother tongue is Malayalam.

== Domestic career ==
Nair made his first-class debut in the 2013–14 season in which Karnataka won the Ranji Trophy. He scored three consecutive centuries in their final league game and the first-two knockout matches. He went through a lean patch in the 2014–15 season with a string of low scores but bounced back smashing 328 runs in the final helping Karnataka to win the title again. He also became the second player from Karnataka to score a triple century and the first batter to score a triple century in a Ranji final since 1946–47. It was also the highest total by a batter in the final of the Ranji Trophy. He scored 500 runs in the 2015–16 Ranji Trophy including two centuries and two half-centuries. He continued his good run in the next season hitting one century and three half-centuries from his six appearances in the season.

In October 2018, he was named in India A's squad for the 2018–19 Deodhar Trophy. The following month, he was named as one of eight players to watch ahead of the 2018–19 Ranji Trophy. In August 2019, he was named in the India Red team's squad for the 2019–20 Duleep Trophy.

In 2023, Nair played for Burbage & Easton Royal CC in the West of England Premier League - Prem 2 (Gloucs/Wilts).

In January 2025, Nair scored 542 runs without getting out in the Vijay Hazare Trophy, to create a new world record of scoring the most List A runs between dismissals. He remained unbeaten in five matches, and scored three consecutive centuries to create the record.

== International career ==
Nair was named in the Indian ODI and T20I squads for their series against Zimbabwe in May 2016 and made his One Day International (ODI) debut in the series at Harare Sports Club on 11 June 2016.

On 26 November 2016, he made his Test debut against England at Mohali. He scored his maiden Test century in the final match of the series at the M. A. Chidambaram Stadium, going on to finish 303 not out. He was only three innings old in international cricket then, thus becoming the quickest batsman to hit a maiden triple-hundred in Test cricket history in term of number of matches played. He was also India's second ever triple-centurion after Virender Sehwag, and only the third man in the game's history to convert a maiden Test ton into a triple. India won the match by an innings and 75 runs, and Nair was named as the player of the match. However, he was dropped from the side to make way for the return of Ajinkya Rahane, and did not play in India's next Test match.

In May 2025, he was reselected, his comeback was propelled by consistent domestic performances, including a standout double century for India A against England Lions. In that match, he scored 204 runs, reinforcing his case for inclusion in the national team. Nair participated in the 2025 Anderson-Tendulkar Trophy, playing at 3. In September 2025, The squad for India vs West Indies tests was announced from where he was dropped.

== Indian Premier League ==
Karun was a part of Royal Challengers Bangalore in the 2012 and 2013 seasons of Indian Premier League. He got his breakthrough season with Rajasthan Royals in the 2014 IPL scoring 330 runs in the season at a strike rate of 142.24.

In 2016, Delhi Daredevils signed Karun after Rajasthan was banned from the competition for two years after being found guilty in illegal betting and match-fixing probe. He captained Delhi in 3 matches after an injury to Zaheer Khan in the 2017 season.

He was bought by Kings XI Punjab in the 2018 IPL auction. In February 2021, Nair was bought by the Kolkata Knight Riders in the IPL auction ahead of the 2021 Indian Premier League. In February 2022, he returned to Rajasthan Royals in the auction for the 2022 Indian Premier League tournament.

Nair returned to the IPL 2025, playing for the Delhi Capitals. His first game was against the Mumbai Indians, where he scored 89 runs off 40 balls.

== Personal life ==
In July 2016, Karun survived a boat accident in river Pampa in Kerala during a thanksgiving temple visit after making his ODI debut.

He announced his engagement with longtime girlfriend Sanaya Tankariwala, a media professional on 29 June 2019 through his social media handles. The couple got married in a private ceremony at Udaipur, Rajasthan on 19 January 2020. Their son, Kayaan Nair was born in January 2022.
