= Tanush Kotian =

Indian cricketer (born 1998)

Personal information
- Full name: Tanush Karunakar Kotian
- Born: 16 October 1998 (age 28); Mumbai, Maharashtra, India
- Batting: Right-handed
- Bowling: Right-arm off break
- Role: All-rounder

Domestic team information
- Years: Team
- 2018–present: Mumbai
- 2024: Rajasthan Royals
- 2024: India A

Career statistics
Competition	FC	LA	T20
Matches	37	21	33
Runs scored	1,809	129	87
Batting average	42.06	18.42	21.75
100s/50s	2/15	0/0	0/0
Top score	120*	39*	28
Balls bowled	5,260	1,137	620
Wickets	112	22	33
Bowling average	25.89	41.36	20.03
5 wickets in innings	3	1	0
10 wickets in match	0	–	–
Best bowling	5/58	4/31	4/16
Catches/stumpings	22/–	11/–	14/–
- Source: Cricinfo, 27 March 2025

Tanush Kotian (born 16 October 1998) is an Indian cricketer who plays for Mumbai in domestic cricket and Rajasthan Royals in the Indian Premier League. He is a bowling all-rounder who bats right-handed and bowls off spin.

== Early life ==
Kotian was born and brought up in Chembur, Mumbai. His parents, Karunakar Kotian and Mallika Kotian, are originally from Pangala village in Udupi district, Karnataka. Kotian completed his schooling from St.Joseph High School, Vikhroli and played cricket for his college Ramniranjan Jhunjhunwala College and Mumbai Under-19s, before being selected for India Under-19s in 2017.

== Domestic career ==
He made his first-class debut for Mumbai in the 2018–19 Ranji Trophy on 22 December 2018. He made his List A debut on 9 March 2021, for Mumbai in the 2020–21 Vijay Hazare Trophy. He made his Twenty20 debut on 4 November 2021, for Mumbai in the 2021–22 Syed Mushtaq Ali Trophy.

He scored his first century in first-class cricket against Baroda in the quarter final of 2023–24 Ranji Trophy, when he scored unbeaten 120 off 129, and shared a 232-run partnership with Tushar Deshpande. As Mumbai went on to win the Ranji Trophy, he was named player of the tournament for scoring 502 runs at an average of 41.83 and taking 29 wickets at 16.96.

In 2024, he joined Rajasthan Royals as a replacement for Adam Zampa.

He scored an unbeaten 114 runs against Rest of India in the 2024–25 Irani Cup and helped Mumbai lift the Irani Cup after 27 years. He also played for India A in 2024–25 Duleep Trophy.

== International career ==
In December 2024, he was added to India's Test squad on their ongoing tour of Australia, following the retirement of R Ashwin.
