= Darshan Nalkande =

Indian cricketer (born 1998)

Personal information
- Full name: Darshan Girish Nalkande
- Born: 4 October 1998 (age 28); Wardha, Maharashtra, India
- Batting: Right-handed
- Bowling: Right-arm fast-medium
- Role: Bowler

Domestic team information
- Years: Team
- 2018–: Vidarbha
- 2022–2024: Gujarat Titans

Career statistics
Competition	FC	LA	T20
Matches	8	37	51
Runs scored	175	338	144
Batting average	19.44	22.53	7.57
100s/50s	0/2	0/2	0/0
Top score	66*	57	21
Balls bowled	768	1,806	1,005
Wickets	12	64	80
Bowling average	43.41	26.12	17.41
5 wickets in innings	0	2	2
10 wickets in match	0	–	–
Best bowling	3/52	6/55	5/9
Catches/stumpings	3/–	4/–	13/–
- Source: ESPNcricinfo, 25 March 2025

Darshan Nalkande (born 4 October 1998) is an Indian cricketer. He made his List A debut for Vidarbha in the 2018–19 Vijay Hazare Trophy on 2 October 2018. He made his first-class debut for Vidarbha in the 2018–19 Ranji Trophy on 1 November 2018.

In December 2018, he was bought by the Punjab Kings in the player auction for the 2019 Indian Premier League (IPL). He made his Twenty20 debut for Vidarbha in the 2018–19 Syed Mushtaq Ali Trophy on 21 February 2019. In February 2022, he was bought by the Gujarat Titans in the auction for the 2022 Indian Premier League tournament. In April 2022, he made his IPL debut against Punjab Kings.

Darshan Nalkande took four wickets in four balls in the final over of Karnataka's innings in 2021–22 Syed Mushtaq Ali Trophy national T20 tournament 20 November 2021.
