= Royston Dias =

Indian cricketer (born 1993)

Personal information
- Full name: Royston Harold Dias
- Born: 30 January 1993 (age 33); Thane, Maharashtra, India
- Batting: Left-handed
- Bowling: Left-arm medium

Domestic team information
- Years: Team
- 2016/17–present: Mumbai
- Source: ESPNcricinfo, 5 July 2013

Royston Dias (born 30 January 1993) is an Indian cricketer who plays for Mumbai in domestic cricket. Born in Vasai, Maharashtra, he is a left-handed batsman and a left-arm medium bowler. He was brought by Delhi Daredevils for 2013 Indian Premier League. He made his List A debut for Mumbai in the 2017–18 Vijay Hazare Trophy on 6 February 2018.
