= Parth Rekhade =

Indian cricketer

Personal information
- Full name: Parth Rekhade
- Source: Cricinfo, 14 November 2019

Parth Rekhade is an Indian cricketer. In November 2019, he was named in India's squad for the 2019 ACC Emerging Teams Asia Cup in Bangladesh. He made his List A debut for India, against Nepal, in the Emerging Teams Cup on 14 November 2019.
