= Pradipta Pramanik =

Indian cricketer (born 1998)

Personal information
- Full name: Pradipta Jagadish Pramanik
- Born: 8 October 1998 (age 28); Kolkata, West Bengal, India
- Batting: Right-handed
- Bowling: Slow Left arm Orthodox

Domestic team information
- Years: Team
- 2015/16–present: Bengal

Career statistics
| Competition | FC | LA | T20 |
|---|---|---|---|
| Matches | 16 | 31 | 25 |
| Runs scored | 327 | 214 | 91 |
| Batting average | 19.23 | 40.53 | 13.00 |
| 100s/50s | 0/1 | 0/1 | 0/0 |
| Top score | 60* | 74* | 30 |
| Balls bowled | 2,753 | 1,376 | 371 |
| Wickets | 50 | 48 | 25 |
| Bowling average | 23.92 | 22.22 | 18.84 |
| 5 wickets in innings | 2 | 0 | 0 |
| 10 wickets in match | 0 | 0 | 0 |
| Best bowling | 6/43 | 4/2 | 4/13 |
| Catches/stumpings | 9/– | 10/– | 11/– |
- Source: Cricinfo, 27 April 2025

Pradipta Pramanik (Bengali: প্রদীপ্ত প্রামাণিক; born 8 October 1998) is an Indian cricketer who plays for Bengal. He was also in the Squad of India Under 19 team in 2016. He made his List A debut on 18 December 2015 in the 2015–16 Vijay Hazare Trophy. He made his first-class debut for Bengal in the 2017–18 Ranji Trophy on 17 November 2017.

== See also ==
- List of Bengal cricketers
