= Nishant Sindhu =

Indian cricketer (born 2004)

Personal information
- Born: 9 April 2004 (age 22); Rohtak, Haryana, India
- Batting: Left-handed
- Bowling: Slow left-arm orthodox
- Role: All-rounder

Domestic team information
- Years: Team
- 2022–present: Haryana
- 2023–2024: Chennai Super Kings
- 2025–present: Gujarat Titans

Career statistics
Competition	FC	LA	T20
Matches	28	36	26
Runs scored	1,708	755	460
Batting average	37.95	29.03	24.21
100s/50s	6/5	0/4	1/1
Top score	165	88	100*
Balls bowled	3,079	1,448	306
Wickets	63	40	17
Bowling average	26.98	27.82	19.17
5 wickets in innings	3	1	0
10 wickets in match	1	0	0
Best bowling	6/47	5/20	3/15
Catches/stumpings	13/–	8/–	10/–
Medal record
Men's cricket
Representing India
ICC U19 Cricket World Cup
Winner	2022 West Indies
ACC U19 Asia Cup
Winner	2021 UAE
ACC Emerging Asia Cup
Runner-up	2023 Sri Lanka
- Source: ESPNcricinfo, 25 March 2025

Nishant Sindhu (born 9 April 2004) is an Indian cricketer who plays for Haryana in domestic cricket. In December 2022, he was bought by the Chennai Super Kings in the auction for the 2023 Indian Premier League tournament.

== Career ==
He made his first-class debut against Tripura in the 2021–22 Ranji Trophy on 17 February 2022. He made his Twenty20 debut against Services on 11 October 2022 in the 2022–23 Syed Mushtaq Ali Trophy. He made his List A debut against Kerala on 12 November 2022 in the 2022–23 Vijay Hazare Trophy.

Sindhu played for the India national under-19 cricket team, including at the 2022 ICC Under-19 Cricket World Cup and 2021 ACC Under-19 Asia Cup.

In June 2023, he was named in North Zone squad for the 2023 Duleep Trophy. He scored a 150 against North East Zone. In July 2023, he was named in India A squad for the 2023 ACC Emerging Teams Asia Cup.
