= Nitin Pandit =

Indian cricket umpire (born 1975)

Personal information
- Full name: Nitin Pandit
- Born: 15 April 1975 (age 51)
- Role: Umpire

Umpiring information
- WTests umpired: 1 (2014)
- WODIs umpired: 1 (2018)
- WT20Is umpired: 5 (2016–2019)
- Source: ESPNcricinfo, 4 March 2023

Nitin Pandit (born 15 April 1975) is an Indian cricket umpire. He has stood in matches in the Ranji Trophy tournament.
