= Shashwat Rawat =

Indian cricketer (born 2001)

Personal information
- Full name: Shashwat Gopal Rawat
- Born: 6 April 2001 (age 25); Gajiwali, Uttarakhand, India
- Batting: Left-handed
- Bowling: Right-arm medium-fast

Domestic team information
- Years: Team
- 2021/22-present: Baroda

Career statistics
Competition	FC	LA	T20
Matches	24	14	7
Runs scored	1,769	527	225
Batting average	46.55	37.64	32.14
100s/50s	7/7	1/3	0/1
Top score	207	104	63
Balls bowled	78	7	2
Wickets	2	1	1
Bowling average	32.00	6.00	6.00
5 wickets in innings	0	0	0
10 wickets in match	0	0	0
Best bowling	1/15	1/6	1/6
Catches/stumpings	18/–	3/–	2/–
- Source: Cricinfo, 20 March 2025

Shashwat Rawat (born 6 April 2001) is an Indian cricketer who plays for Baroda in domestic cricket. He made his Twenty20 debut on 4 November 2021, for Baroda in the 2021–22 Syed Mushtaq Ali Trophy. Prior to his Twenty20 debut, he was named in India's squad for the 2020 Under-19 Cricket World Cup. He made his List A debut on 8 December 2021, for Baroda in the 2021–22 Vijay Hazare Trophy.
