= Yash Rathod =

Indian cricketer (born 2000)

Personal information
- Full name: Yash Vijay Rathod
- Born: 16 May 2000 (age 26); Nagpur, India
- Batting: Left-handed
- Bowling: Slow left-arm orthodox
- Role: Middle-order batter

Domestic team information
- Years: Team
- 2020/21–present: Vidarbha

Career statistics
Competition	FC	LA	T20
Matches	27	24	4
Runs scored	2,449	859	74
Batting average	61.22	47.72	18.50
100s/50s	9/11	3/2	0/0
Top score	194	138*	36
Balls bowled	6	51	0
Wickets	0	4	0
Bowling average	–	13.50	–
5 wickets in innings	0	0	0
10 wickets in match	0	0	0
Best bowling	–	3/38	–
Catches/stumpings	19/–	12/–	1/–
- Source: Cricinfo, 20 November 2025

Yash Rathod (born 16 May 2000) is an Indian cricketer. In November 2019, he was named in India's squad for the 2019 ACC Emerging Teams Asia Cup in Bangladesh. He made his List A debut for India, against Nepal, in the Emerging Teams Cup on 14 November 2019. He made his Twenty20 debut on 17 January 2021, for Vidarbha in the 2020–21 Syed Mushtaq Ali Trophy.
