= Himachal Pradesh cricket team =

Indian cricket team

Personnel
- Captain: Pukhraj Mann (FC); Mridul Surroch (LA); Pukhraj Mann (T20)
- Owner: Himachal Pradesh Cricket Association

Team information
- Founded: 1985
- Home ground: Himachal Pradesh Cricket Association Stadium
- Capacity: 25,000

History
- First-class debut: Jammu and Kashmir in 1985 at Sher-i-Kashmir Stadium, Srinagar
- Vijay Hazare Trophy wins: 1
- Official website: http://www.hpcricket.org/

The Himachal Pradesh cricket team is an Indian cricket team based in Himachal Pradesh. It has competed in the Ranji Trophy since the 1985–86 season. They have won their first domestic trophy, by winning the 2021–22 edition of Vijay Hazare Trophy.

== Playing history ==
Himachal Pradesh lost all five of their matches in both 1985–86 and 1987–88 seasons by an innings. They won for the first time when they beat Services by one wicket in 1990–91. In 2006–07, Himachal Pradesh won the Plate Group of the Ranji Trophy, beating Orissa in the final after finishing top of their group.

After the 2018–19 season, Himachal Pradesh had played 202 Ranji Trophy matches with 37 wins, 86 losses and 79 draws.

Most of Himachal Pradesh's home games are played at the Himachal Pradesh Cricket Association Stadium in Dharamshala.

In the 2016–17 Ranji Trophy, Himachal Pradesh recorded their lowest total in the competition when they were bowled out for 36 runs against Hyderabad on 28 October 2016.

Himachal Pradesh's best finishes in Syed Mushtaq Ali Trophy were in 2009–10 and 2020–21, when they reached quarterfinals and lost to Tamil Nadu on both the occasions. They won their maiden title in 2021–22 Vijay Hazare Trophy defeating Tamil Nadu in final.

== Honours ==
- Vijay Hazare Trophy
  - Winners: 2021–22
- Syed Mushtaq Ali Trophy
  - Runners-up: 2022–23

== Famous players ==
Players from Himachal Pradesh who have played for India, along with year of debut:

- Rishi Dhawan (2015)

Players from other state teams who played cricket for India, and also played for Himachal Pradesh along with years:

- Ajay Sharma (2000)
- Vikram Rathour (2002–2003)
- Aashish Kapoor (2002–2003)
- Sarandeep Singh (2006–2010)
- Ajay Ratra (2011–2012)
- Sridharan Sriram (2011–2012)
- Aakash Chopra (2012–2013)

Players from Himachal Pradesh who have played international cricket for another country, along with year of debut:

- Raghav Dhawan (2024)
- Sumeet Verma (2025)

Prominent players without international cap

- Rajeev Nayyar (1986-2006)
- Jaswant Rai (1986-2000)
- Shakti Singh (1987-2002)
- Virender Sharma (1990-2006)
- Nischal Gaur (1993-2007)
- Sangram Singh (1995-2013)
- Rahul Panta (1996-2006)
- Ajay Mannu (1996-2010)
- Paras Dogra (2001-2018)
- Vishal Bhatia (2001-2013)
- Ashok Thakur (2001-2010)
- Vikramjeet Malik (2002-2015)
- Prashant Chopra (2011-2025)
- Nikhil Gangta (2012-2026)
- Ankush Bains (2013-present)
- Pankaj Jaswal (2013-2023)
- Mayank Dagar (2015-present)
- Vaibhav Arora (2019-2026)

== Current squad ==
Players with international caps are listed in bold.

Name	Birth date	Batting style	Bowling style	Notes
Batsmen
Pukhraj Mann	7 June 2001 (age 25)	Left-handed	Slow left-arm orthodox	**First-class and Twenty20 Captain**
Ankit Kalsi	26 September 1993 (age 33)	Left-handed	Slow left-arm orthodox	
Ekant Sen	21 June 1995 (age 31)	Right-handed	Right-arm medium	
Kushal Pal	9 October 2001 (age 25)	Left-handed	Slow left-arm orthodox	
Nehal Wadhera	4 September 2000 (age 26)	Left-handed	Right-arm leg break	
Shubham Arora	26 October 1997 (age 29)	Left-handed		
Hritik Kalia	17 January 2000 (age 26)	Right-handed	Left-arm medium	
All-rounders
Akash Vasisht	17 December 1994 (age 31)	Left-handed	Slow left-arm orthodox	
Mridul Surroch	1 July 2003 (age 23)	Right-handed	Right-arm off-break	**List A Captain**
Amanpreet Singh	22 November 2002 (age 23)	Right-handed	Right-arm off-break	
Nitin Sharma	28 September 1996 (age 30)	Right-handed	Right-arm medium	
Ayush Jamwal	11 August 1999 (age 27)	Right-handed	Slow left-arm orthodox	
Wicket-keepers
Ankush Bains	16 December 1995 (age 30)	Right-handed		
Innesh Mahajan	15 April 2005 (age 21)	Left-handed		
Vaibhav Kalta	2 November 2002 (age 24)	Right-handed		
Spin Bowlers
Aryaman Singh	30 April 2002 (age 24)	Right-handed	Slow left-arm orthodox	
Mayank Dagar	11 November 1996 (age 30)	Right-handed	Slow left-arm orthodox	
Mukul Negi	28 September 1997 (age 29)	Right-handed	Right-arm off-break	
Pace Bowlers
Arpit Guleria	26 April 1997 (age 29)	Right-handed	Right-arm medium	
Rohit Kumar	11 June 1999 (age 27)	Right-handed	Right-arm medium	
Vipin Sharma	27 May 1998 (age 28)	Right-handed	Right-arm medium	
Abhishek Kumar	20 December 1995 (age 30)	Right-handed	Right-arm medium	
Jitendra Rana	29 May 1998 (age 28)	Right-handed	Right-arm medium	

Updated as on 17 November 2026
