= 2025–26 Ranji Trophy =

Cricket tournament in India

- Tournament logo
- Dates: 15 October 2025 – 28 February 2026
- Administrator: BCCI
- Cricket format: First-class cricket
- Tournament format: Round-robin then knockout
- Host: India
- Champions: Jammu and Kashmir (1st title)
- Runners-up: Karnataka
- Participants: 38
- Matches: 135
- Player of the series: Auqib Nabi (Jammu and Kashmir)
- Most runs: Ravichandran Smaran (Karnataka) (950)
- Most wickets: Auqib Nabi (Jammu and Kashmir) (60)
- Official website: Ranji Trophy Elite; Ranji Trophy Plate

The 2025–26 Ranji Trophy (also known as the IDFC First Bank Ranji Trophy for sponsorship reasons) was the 91st season of the Ranji Trophy, the premier first-class cricket tournament in India. It took place from 15 October 2025 to 28 February 2026. Vidarbha were the defending champions. Jammu and Kashmir defeated Karnataka in the final to win their maiden Ranji title.

== Format ==
The teams are divided into two categories: one named the Elite category, which has 32 teams split into four groups, and one called the Plate category, which has 6 teams in one group. The Elite category teams play each other once, with the top two teams from each group qualifying for the quarter-finals. In the Plate Group, teams also play each other once, but the top four teams qualify for the plate group knockouts, with the bottom two teams playing for the fifth and sixth positions, and another playoff for the third and fourth positions with the semi-final losers. The Plate winner will be promoted to the Elite group for the next season, 2025–26, while the bottom team of all four Elite groups combined, factoring in both points and the quotient, will be relegated to the Plate group.

Points system
Match result	Points earned
Win	6
Tie	3
Draw (first innings lead)	3
Draw (first innings deficit or first innings unfinished)	1
No result	1
Bonus (win with innings or by 10-wickets)	1
Loss	0

== Teams ==
Group A	Group B	Group C	Group D	Plate Group
Vidarbha	Kerala	Gujarat	Mumbai	Bihar
Tamil Nadu	Saurashtra	Haryana	Jammu & Kashmir	Meghalaya
Baroda	Chandigarh	Services	Himachal Pradesh	Mizoram
Jharkhand	Karnataka	Bengal	Delhi	Sikkim
Odisha	Maharashtra	Railways	Hyderabad	Manipur
Uttar Pradesh	Madhya Pradesh	Tripura	Rajasthan	Arunchal Pradesh
Andhra	Punjab	Uttarakhand	Chhattisgarh	—N/a
Nagaland	Goa	Assam	Pondicherry	—N/a

Team changes from last season
▲ Promoted to Elite Groups	▼ Relegated to Plate Group
Nagaland, Goa	Bihar, Meghalaya

== Result by teams ==
Team	Group Matches							Knockouts		
Team	1	2	3	4	5	6	7	QF	SF	F
Group A
Jharkhand	7	8	15	18	18	25	31	L	Did not qualify	
Andhra	1	2	9	15	22	28	31	L	Did not qualify	
Vidarbha	7	10	13	19	25	25	31	Did not qualify		
Baroda	6	7	8	9	9	16	17	Did not qualify		
Uttar Pradesh	3	6	7	14	17	17	17	Did not qualify		
Tamil Nadu	0	3	4	4	5	11	14	Did not qualify		
Odisha	0	1	1	1	7	7	7	Did not qualify		
Nagaland	0	1	1	1	1	1	2	Did not qualify		
Group B
Madhya Pradesh	3	6	9	15	16	22	28	L	Did not qualify	
Karnataka	1	4	11	14	21	21	27	W	W	L
Saurashtra	3	4	5	6	13	19	25	Did not qualify		
Maharashtra	3	9	10	11	18	24	24	Did not qualify		
Goa	7	8	11	11	11	11	11	Did not qualify		
Punjab	1	4	5	11	11	11	11	Did not qualify		
Chandigarh	0	0	1	1	1	8	8	Did not qualify		
Kerala	1	2	2	5	8	8	14	Did not qualify		
Group C
Bengal	6	12	13	20	23	30	36	W	L	Did not qualify
Uttarakhand	0	3	9	16	16	22	29	W	L	Did not qualify
Haryana	6	12	18	18	18	24	24	Did not qualify		
Services	7	13	13	13	19	19	19	Did not qualify		
Railways	0	1	4	4	11	17	23	Did not qualify		
Gujarat	3	3	3	9	15	15	15	Did not qualify		
Tripura	0	0	3	6	6	6	12	Did not qualify		
Assam	1	1	2	3	4	4	4	Did not qualify		
Group D
Mumbai	6	9	10	17	24	30	33	L	Did not qualify	
Jammu & Kashmir	0	7	8	14	20	21	24	W	W	W
Chhattisgarh	0	1	4	11	14	17	17	Did not qualify		
Rajasthan	6	6	9	10	13	14	14	Did not qualify		
Hyderabad	1	4	10	13	13	13	16	Did not qualify		
Delhi	3	6	7	7	8	9	9	Did not qualify		
Himachal Pradesh	3	4	4	4	5	8	9	Did not qualify		
Pondicherry	1	2	5	5	5	6	12	Did not qualify		
Plate Group
Manipur	3	4	11	17	18	—N/a				L
Bihar	7	8	9	10	16	—N/a				W
Meghalaya	1	4	5	12	15	—N/a				
Sikkim	1	2	5	8	15	—N/a				
Mizoram	1	7	1	0	9	—N/a				
Arunchal Pradesh	0	0	0	0	0	—N/a				

Note:

Win =
Loss =
No Result =
Draw =
Tie =

== Standings ==
=== Group A ===
Pos	Team	Pld	W	L	T	D	NR	Pts	Quot	Qualification
1	Jharkhand	7	4	1	0	2	0	31	1.545	Advanced to the Knockout stage
2	Andhra	7	4	0	0	3	0	31	1.628	Advanced to the Knockout stage
3	Vidarbha	7	4	1	0	2	0	31	1.526	
4	Baroda	7	2	1	0	3	1	17	1.113	
5	Uttar Pradesh	7	1	2	0	3	1	17	1.051	
6	Tamil Nadu	7	1	2	0	4	0	14	0.924	
7	Odisha	7	1	5	0	1	0	7	0.693	
8	Nagaland	7	0	5	0	2	0	2	0.377	Relegated to Plate; Group for next season

Source: ESPNcricinfo

=== Group B ===
Pos	Team	Pld	W	L	T	D	NR	Pts	Quot	Qualification
1	Madhya Pradesh	7	3	0	0	4	0	28	1.291	Advanced to the Knockout stage
2	Karnataka	7	3	1	0	3	0	27	1.408	Advanced to the Knockout stage
3	Saurashtra	7	3	0	0	4	0	26	1.633	
4	Maharashtra	7	3	1	0	3	0	24	1.294	
5	Kerala	7	1	2	0	4	0	14	0.804	
6	Goa	7	1	4	0	2	0	11	0.842	
7	Punjab	7	1	3	0	3	0	11	0.714	
8	Chandigarh	7	1	5	0	1	0	8	0.544	

Source: ESPNcricinfo

=== Group C ===
Pos	Team	Pld	W	L	T	D	NR	Pts	Quot	Qualification
1	Bengal	7	5	0	0	2	0	36	1.640	Advanced to the Knockout stage
2	Uttarakhand	7	4	2	0	1	0	29	1.153	Advanced to the Knockout stage
3	Haryana	7	4	3	0	0	0	24	0.928	
4	Railways	7	3	2	0	2	0	23	1.083	
5	Services	7	3	4	0	0	0	19	1.112	
6	Gujarat	7	2	4	0	1	0	15	0.980	
7	Tripura	7	1	4	0	2	0	12	0.750	
8	Assam	7	0	3	0	4	0	4	0.557	

Source: ESPNcricinfo

=== Group D ===
Pos	Team	Pld	W	L	T	D	NR	Pts	Quot	Qualification
1	Mumbai	7	4	0	0	3	0	33	1.444	Advanced to the Knockout stage
2	Jammu & Kashmir	7	3	1	0	3	0	24	1.577	Advanced to the Knockout stage
3	Chhattisgarh	7	1	1	0	5	0	17	1.106	
4	Hyderabad	7	1	2	0	4	0	16	0.925	
5	Rajasthan	7	1	2	0	4	0	14	1.108	
6	Pondicherry	7	1	2	0	4	0	12	0.583	
7	Delhi	7	0	1	0	6	0	9	0.938	
8	Himachal Pradesh	7	0	2	0	5	0	9	0.634	

Source: ESPNcricinfo

=== Plate Group ===
Pos	Team	Pld	W	L	T	D	NR	Pts	Quot	Qualification
1	Manipur	5	2	0	0	3	0	18	1.522	Advanced to the Plate Final
2	Bihar	5	2	0	0	3	0	16	1.261	Advanced to the Plate Final
3	Meghalaya	5	1	0	0	3	1	15	2.116	Remain in the Plate group.
4	Sikkim	5	1	0	0	4	0	15	1.495	Remain in the Plate group.
5	Mizoram	5	1	2	0	1	1	9	1.104	Remain in the Plate group.
6	Arunchal Pradesh	5	0	5	0	0	0	0	0.176	Remain in the Plate group.

Updated to match(es) played on 16 November 2025. Source: ESPNcricinfo

== Fixtures ==
=== Group A ===
==== Round 1 ====
15-18 October 2025	Odisha	v	Baroda	Baroda won by 7 wickets
Scorecard	271 (116.1 overs); Rajesh Dhuper 94 (252); Atit Sheth 4/67 (22 overs)		413/7 d (146 overs); Shivalik Sharma 124 (248); Sumit Sharma 3/104 (28 overs)	Barabati Stadium, Cuttack; Umpires: K Nidhin and Rajesh Kannan; Player of the match: Shivalik Sharma (Baroda)
Scorecard	174 (59.3 overs); Subhranshu Senapati 59* (114); Mahesh Pithiya 6/63 (26.3 overs)		36/3 (7.4 overs); Shivalik Sharma 32* (26); Badal Biswal 2/20 (4 overs)	Barabati Stadium, Cuttack; Umpires: K Nidhin and Rajesh Kannan; Player of the match: Shivalik Sharma (Baroda)
Odisha won the toss and elected to bat; Points: Baroda 6, Odisha 0

15-18 October 2025	Andhra	v	Uttar Pradesh	Match drawn
Scorecard	470 (143 overs); Srikar Bharat 142 (244); Vipraj Nigam 4/136 (41 overs)		471/8 (169 overs); Rinku Singh 165* (273); Prithvi Raj 2/85 (31 overs)	Green Park Stadium, Kanpur; Umpires: Parashar Joshi and Virender Sharma; Player of the match: Rinku Singh (Uttar Pradesh)
Andhra won the toss and elected to bat; Points: Uttar Pradesh 3, Andhra 1

15-18 October 2025	Jharkhand	v	Tamil Nadu	Jharkhand won by an innings and 114 runs
Scorecard	419 (132.1 overs); Ishan Kishan 173 (247); Gurjapneet Singh 4/71 (27 overs)		93 (50.4 overs); RS Ambrish 28 (44); Jatin Pandey 5/35 (14.4 overs)	Sri Ramakrishna College of Arts and Science Ground, Coimbatore; Umpires: Keyur Kelkar and Rohan Pandit; Player of the match: Ishan Kishan(Jharkhand)
Scorecard			212 (79 overs) (f/o); Andre Siddarth 80 (180); Rishav Raj 4/49 (19 overs)	Sri Ramakrishna College of Arts and Science Ground, Coimbatore; Umpires: Keyur Kelkar and Rohan Pandit; Player of the match: Ishan Kishan(Jharkhand)
Jharkhand won the toss and elected to field; Points: Jharkhand 7, Tamil Nadu 0

15-17 October 2025	Vidarbha	v	Nagaland	Vidarbha won by an innings and 179 runs
Scorecard	463 (130.2 overs); Aman Mokhade 183 (308); Rongsen Jonathan 4/98 (22.2 overs)		171 (69.3 overs); Chetan Bist 52 (91); Nachiket Bhute 5/34 (17.3 overs)	BCCI COE Ground 2, Bengaluru; Umpires: Madanagopal Kuppuraj and Navdeep Singh; Player of the match: Aman Mokhade (Vidarbha)
Scorecard			113 (46.3 overs) (f/o); Chetan Bist 55 (88); Harsh Dubey 5/42 (16.4 overs)	BCCI COE Ground 2, Bengaluru; Umpires: Madanagopal Kuppuraj and Navdeep Singh; Player of the match: Aman Mokhade (Vidarbha)
Nagaland won the toss and elected to field; Points: Vidarbha 7, Nagaland 0

==== Round 2 ====
25–28 October 2025	Baroda	v	Andhra	Match drawn
Scorecard	363 (109 overs); Vishnu Solanki 131 (223); Kavuri Saiteja 4/71 (23 overs)		43/2 (16 overs); Abhishek Reddy 15 (28); Bhargav Bhatt 2/9 (8 overs)	Dr P.V.G. Raju ACA Sports Complex, Vizianagaram; Umpires: K Nidhin and Keyur Kelkar
Baroda won the toss and elected to bat; Points: Baroda 1, Andhra 1

25-28 October 2025	Odisha	v	Uttar Pradesh	Match drawn
Scorecard	243 (77.1 overs); Govinda Poddar 64 (109); Shivam Sharma 3/65 (21 overs)		409/6d (130 overs); Karan Sharma 121 (276); Sambit Baral 3/52 (20 overs)	Green Park Stadium, Kanpur; Umpires: Pranav Joshi and Sivasubramaniyan Shankar; Player of the match: Karan Sharma (Uttar Pradesh)
Scorecard	151/3 (44 overs); Swastik Samal 71* (113); Shivam Mavi 2/32 (9 overs)			Green Park Stadium, Kanpur; Umpires: Pranav Joshi and Sivasubramaniyan Shankar; Player of the match: Karan Sharma (Uttar Pradesh)
Odisha won the toss and elected to bat; Points: Odisha 1, Uttar Pradesh 3

25–28 October 2025	Tamil Nadu	v	Nagaland	Match drawn
Scorecard	512/3d (115 overs); Pradosh Ranjan Paul 201* (314); Ronit More 1/44 (18.3 overs)		446 (157.4 overs); Dega Nischal 175 (376); Gurjapneet Singh 4/75 (33 overs)	BCCI COE Ground 3, Bengaluru; Umpires: Anmol Sharda and Nitin Pandit; Player of the match: Pradosh Ranjan Paul (Tamil Nadu)
Tamil Nadu won the toss and elected to bat; Points: Tamil Nadu 3, Nagaland 1

25–28 October 2025	Jharkhand	v	Vidarbha	Match drawn
Scorecard	332 (125.3 overs); Sharandeep Singh 69 (169); Nachiket Bhute 4/41 (23.3 overs)		492/5 (161.1 overs); Aman Mokhade 176 (312); Anukul Roy 2/142 (52 overs)	Vidarbha Cricket Association Stadium, Jamtha, Nagpur; Umpires: Ganesh Charhate and Tony Ematty; Player of the match: Aman Mokhade (Vidarbha)
Vidarbha won the toss and elected to field; Points: Jharkhand 1, Vidarbha 3

==== Round 3 ====
01-04 November 2025	Andhra	v	Odisha	Andhra won by an innings and 50 runs
Scorecard	475/7 d (123.1 overs); Shaik Rasheed 140* (224); Govinda Poddar 2/80 (17.1 overs)		151 (56.4 overs); Sandeep Pattanaik 58 (131); Tripurana Vijay 3/14 (11 overs)	Barabati Stadium, Cuttack; Umpires: Sadashiv Iyer and Vaibhav Dhokre; Player of the match: Saurabh Kumar (Andhra)
Scorecard			274 (104.2 overs) (f/o); Gourav Choudhury 80 (170); Saurabh Kumar 3/47 (26.2 overs)	Barabati Stadium, Cuttack; Umpires: Sadashiv Iyer and Vaibhav Dhokre; Player of the match: Saurabh Kumar (Andhra)
Andhra won the toss and elected to bat; Points: Andhra 7, Odisha 0

01-04 November 2025	Jharkhand	v	Nagaland	Jharkhand won by an innings and 196 runs
Scorecard	510/8 d (105 overs); Shikhar Mohan 207 (303); Rongsen Jonathan 3/129 (29 overs)		154 (73.5 overs); Chetan Bist 46* (95); Anukul Roy 8/55 (24.5 overs)	JSCA International Stadium Complex, Ranchi; Umpires: Yashodhan Gavankar and M Ashwin Kumar; Player of the match: Anukul Roy (Jharkhand)
Scorecard			160 (57.4 overs) (f/o); Rongsen Jonathan 50 (76); Anukul Roy 5/35 (15.4 overs)	JSCA International Stadium Complex, Ranchi; Umpires: Yashodhan Gavankar and M Ashwin Kumar; Player of the match: Anukul Roy (Jharkhand)
Nagaland won the toss and elected to field; Points: Jharkhand 7, Nagaland 0

01-04 November 2025	Baroda	v	Uttar Pradesh	Match abandoned without a ball bowled
Scorecard				Kotambi Stadium, Vadodara; Umpires: Anand M Ovalekar and Nikhil Menon
Points: Baroda 1, Uttar Pradesh 1

01-04 November 2025	Tamil Nadu	v	Vidarbha	Match drawn
Scorecard	291 (107.1 overs); Pradosh Ranjan Paul 113 (275); Nachiket Bhute 5/65 (26 overs)		501 (148.4 overs); Yash Rathod 133 (189); Sai Kishore 5/150 (52 overs)	Sri Ramakrishna College of Arts and Science Ground, Coimbatore; Umpires: Tapan Sharma and Vijay V Shirpuram; Player of the match: Nachiket Bhute (Vidarbha)
Scorecard	233/6 (89 overs); Baba Indrajith 77* (189); Praful Hinge 4/60 (20 overs)			Sri Ramakrishna College of Arts and Science Ground, Coimbatore; Umpires: Tapan Sharma and Vijay V Shirpuram; Player of the match: Nachiket Bhute (Vidarbha)
Tamil Nadu won the toss and elected to bat; Points: Tamil Nadu 1, Vidarbha 3

==== Round 4 ====
08-10 November 2025	Uttar Pradesh	v	Nagaland	Uttar Pradesh won by an innings and 265 runs
Scorecard	535/6d (138.4 overs); Madhav Kaushik 185* (174); Rongsen Jonathan 4/150 (33 overs)		117 (45.3 overs); Dega Nischal 47 (76); Shivam Mavi 5/18 (10 overs)	Green Park Stadium, Kanpur; Umpires: Dharmesh Bhardwaj and Rajesh Kannan; Player of the match: Shivam Mavi (Uttar Pradesh)
Scorecard			153 (51.1 overs) (f/o); Chetan Bist 53 (98); Shivam Sharma 5/25 (12.1 overs)	Green Park Stadium, Kanpur; Umpires: Dharmesh Bhardwaj and Rajesh Kannan; Player of the match: Shivam Mavi (Uttar Pradesh)
Uttar Pradesh won the toss and elected to bat; Points: Uttar Pradesh 7, Nagaland 0

08-10 November 2025	Tamil Nadu	v	Andhra	Andhra won by 4 wickets
Scorecard	182 (74.3 overs); P Vidyuth 40 (118); Prithvi Raj 4/46 (17 overs)		177 (49 overs); Shaik Rasheed 87* (150); Sandeep Warrier 4/53 (16 overs)	Dr. Y.S. Rajasekhara Reddy ACA VDCA Cricket Stadium, Vizag; Umpires: Nikhil Patwardhan and Prakash Kumar; Player of the match: Abhishek Reddy (Andhra)
Scorecard	195 (70.3 overs); Balasubramaniam Sachin 51 (81); Saurabh Kumar 4/46 (18.3 overs)		201/6 (41.2 overs); Abhishek Reddy 70 (75); Sai Kishore 3/46 (15 overs)	Dr. Y.S. Rajasekhara Reddy ACA VDCA Cricket Stadium, Vizag; Umpires: Nikhil Patwardhan and Prakash Kumar; Player of the match: Abhishek Reddy (Andhra)
Tamil Nadu won the toss and elected to bat; Points: Andhra 6, Tamil Nadu 0

08-11 November 2025	Vidarbha	v	Odisha	Vidarbha won by 100 runs
Scorecard	286 (118.4 overs); Dhruv Shorey 144 (298); Sambit Baral 3/69 (26 overs)		160 (73.3 overs); Subhranshu Senapati 41 (112); Gaurav Farde 4/28 (16.3 overs)	Vidarbha Cricket Association Stadium, Jamtha, Nagpur; Umpires: Donovan Koch and Madanagopal Kuppuraj; Player of the match: Dhruv Shorey (Vidarbha)
Scorecard	218/2d (59 overs); Aman Mokhade 101* (152); Badal Biswal 2/83 (23 overs)		244 (84 overs); Swastik Samal 65 (123); Parth Rekhade 5/80 (28 overs)	Vidarbha Cricket Association Stadium, Jamtha, Nagpur; Umpires: Donovan Koch and Madanagopal Kuppuraj; Player of the match: Dhruv Shorey (Vidarbha)
Odisha won the toss and elected to field; Points: Vidarbha 6, Odisha 0

08-11 November 2025	Jharkhand	v	Baroda	Match drawn
Scorecard	506 (140 overs); Kumar Kushagra 234 (367); Bhargav Bhatt 3/123 (36 overs)		291 (103.2 overs); Shashwat Rawat 106 (230); Sahil Raj 4/63 (20 overs)	Kotambi Stadium, Vadodara; Umpires: Indranil Chakravarti and Rakesh Raghavan; Player of the match: Kumar Kushagra (Jharkhand)
Scorecard	226/4 (66 overs); Shikhar Mohan 102* (200); Bhargav Bhatt 3/73 (17 overs)			Kotambi Stadium, Vadodara; Umpires: Indranil Chakravarti and Rakesh Raghavan; Player of the match: Kumar Kushagra (Jharkhand)
Baroda won the toss and elected to field; Points: Baroda 1, Jharkhand 3

==== Round 5 ====
16–19 November 2025	Odisha	v	Nagaland	Odisha won by 299 runs
Scorecard	275 (104.4 overs); Anil Parida 118* (297); Imliwati Lemtur 3/26 (24.4 overs)		161 (57.3 overs); Dega Nischal 72 (122); Govinda Poddar 3/22 (12 overs)	KIIT Cricket Stadium, Bhubaneshwar; Umpires: Prakash Kumar and Ranjeev Sharma; Player of the match: Swastik Samal (Odisha)
Scorecard	350/5d (71 overs); Swastik Samal 169 (195); Vino Zhimomi 2/79 (19 overs)		165 (83 overs); Dega Nischal 52 (126); Govinda Poddar 5/69 (31 overs)	KIIT Cricket Stadium, Bhubaneshwar; Umpires: Prakash Kumar and Ranjeev Sharma; Player of the match: Swastik Samal (Odisha)
Odisha won the toss and elected to bat; Points: Odisha 6, Nagaland 0

16–19 November 2025	Tamil Nadu	v	Uttar Pradesh	Match drawn
Scorecard	455 (136.3 overs); Baba Indrajith 149 (188); Kartik Yadav 5/103 (31.3 overs)		460 (145.1 overs); Rinku Singh 176 (247); P Vidyuth 4/73 (28 overs)	Sri Ramakrishna College of Arts and Science Ground, Coimbatore; Umpires: Saiyed Khalid and Ulhas Gandhe; Player of the match: Rinku Singh (Uttar Pradesh)
Scorecard	103/2 (21 overs); Balasubramaniam Sachin 59 (74); Abhishek Goswami 1/4 (1)			Sri Ramakrishna College of Arts and Science Ground, Coimbatore; Umpires: Saiyed Khalid and Ulhas Gandhe; Player of the match: Rinku Singh (Uttar Pradesh)
Tamil Nadu won the toss and elected to bat; Points: Tamil Nadu 1, Uttar Pradesh 3

16–19 November 2025	Jharkhand	v	Andhra	Andhra won by an innings and 81 runs
Scorecard	328 (112.3 overs); Sharandeep Singh 115 (209); KV Sasikanth 4/67 (24 overs)		567/6d (128 overs); Abhishek Reddy 247 (348); Rishav Raj 2/86 (16 overs)	Keenan Stadium, Jamshedpur; Umpires: MM Srinivasa Rangan and Sanjay Kumar Singh; Player of the match: Abhishek Reddy (Andhra)
Scorecard	158 (52.2 overs); Sharandeep Singh 65 (114); Saurabh Kumar 5/47 (21.2 overs)			Keenan Stadium, Jamshedpur; Umpires: MM Srinivasa Rangan and Sanjay Kumar Singh; Player of the match: Abhishek Reddy (Andhra)
Jharkhand won the toss and elected to bat; Points: Andhra 7, Jharkhand 0

16–19 November 2025	Vidarbha	v	Baroda	Vidarbha won by 144 runs
Scorecard	169 (58 overs); Yash Rathod 40* (72); Ninad Rathva 5/47 (16 overs)		166 (72.2 overs); Vishnu Solanki 59* (88); Nachiket Bhute 3/24 (17 overs)	Vidarbha Cricket Association Stadium, Jamtha, Nagpur; Umpires: Akshay Totre and Krishnaraj Srinath; Player of the match: Yash Rathod (Vidarbha)
Scorecard	272 (98.2 overs); Yash Rathod 91 (142); Atit Sheth 5/47 (15.2 overs)		131 (50.4 overs); Sukirt Pandey 37 (98); Darshan Nalkande 5/12 (11 overs)	Vidarbha Cricket Association Stadium, Jamtha, Nagpur; Umpires: Akshay Totre and Krishnaraj Srinath; Player of the match: Yash Rathod (Vidarbha)
Vidarbha won the toss and elected to bat; Points: Vidarbha 6, Baroda 0

==== Round 6 ====
22–25 January 2026
Scorecard

Tamil Nadu; 286 (86 overs) & 316 (88.2 overs)	v	Odisha; 148 (51.2 overs) & 247 (83 overs)

Tamil Nadu won by 207 runs
Barabati Stadium, Cuttack
Points: Tamil Nadu 6, Odisha 0

22–25 January 2026
Scorecard

Jharkhand; 561/6d (151.5 overs)	v	Uttar Pradesh; 176 (56.2 overs) & 84 (27.4 overs) (f/o)

Jharkhand won by an innings and 301 runs
Ekana Cricket Stadium, Lucknow
Points: Jharkhand 7, Uttar Pradesh 0

22–25 January 2026
Scorecard

Vidarbha; 295 (89.3 overs) & 191 (55.2 overs)	v	Andhra; 228 (65.3 overs) & 259/2 (56.1 overs)

Andhra won by 8 wickets
Rural Development Trust Stadium, Anantapur
Points: Andhra 6, Vidarbha 0

22–25 January 2026
Scorecard

Nagaland; 206 (57 overs) & 141 (34.3 overs)	v	Baroda; 353 (89.3 overs)

Baroda won by an innings and 6 runs
Baroda Cricket Association Stadium, Vadodara
Points: Baroda 7, Nagaland 0

==== Round 7 ====
29 January-01 February 2026
Scorecard

Uttar Pradesh; 237 (68.5 overs) & 200 (77.3 overs)	v	Vidarbha; 237 (63 overs) & 201 (58.2 overs)

Vidarbha won by 4 wickets
Vidarbha Cricket Association Stadium, Jamtha, Nagpur
Points: Vidarbha 6, Uttar Pradesh 0

29 January-01 February 2026
Scorecard

Baroda; 375 (141.3 overs) & 124/0 (35 overs)	v	Tamil Nadu; 449 (148.1 overs)

Match drawn
Salem Cricket Foundation Stadium
Points: Baroda 1, Tamil Nadu 3

29 January-01 February 2026
Scorecard

Nagaland; 366 (108.3 overs) & 342 (104 overs)	v	Andhra; 536/9d (130 overs) & 64/4 (8.3 overs)

Match drawn
Nagaland Cricket Stadium, Sovima
Points: Nagaland 1, Andhra 3

29 January-01 February 2026
Scorecard

Odisha; 282 (104.5 overs) & 226 (82 overs)	v	Jharkhand; 263 (79.1 overs) & 249/6 (71.3 overs)

Jharkhand won by 4 wickets
Keenan Stadium, Jamshedpur
Points: Jharkhand 6, Odisha 0

=== Group B ===
==== Round 1 ====
15–18 October 2025	Maharashtra	v	Kerala	Match drawn
Scorecard	239 (84.1 overs); Ruturaj Gaikwad 91 (151); M. D. Nidheesh 5/49 (20 overs)		219 (63.2 overs); Sanju Samson 54 (63); Jalaj Saxena 3/46 (16 overs)	Sports Hub International Cricket stadium, Thiruvananthapuram; Umpires: Ajitesh Argal and Mohit Krishnadas; Player of the match: Ruturaj Gaikwad (Maharashtra)
Scorecard	224/2 (71 overs); Prithvi Shaw 75 (102); Nedumankuzhy Basil 1/23 (7 overs)			Sports Hub International Cricket stadium, Thiruvananthapuram; Umpires: Ajitesh Argal and Mohit Krishnadas; Player of the match: Ruturaj Gaikwad (Maharashtra)
Kerala won the toss and elected to field.; Points: Maharashtra 3, Kerala 1

15–18 October 2025	Goa	v	Chandigarh	Goa won by an innings and 75 runs
Scorecard	566 (160.4 overs); Lalit Yadav 213 (393); Vishu Kashyap 7/173 (45 overs)		137 (53.3 overs); Jagjit Singh 31 (72); Lalit Yadav 3/17 (7.3 overs)	Goa Cricket Association Academy, Porvorim; Umpires: Chirra Ravikanthreddy and Nand Kishore; Player of the match: Lalit Yadav (Goa)
Scorecard			354 (91.4 overs) (f/o); Arjun Azad 141 (216); Darshan Misal 5/124 (35.4 overs)	Goa Cricket Association Academy, Porvorim; Umpires: Chirra Ravikanthreddy and Nand Kishore; Player of the match: Lalit Yadav (Goa)
Goa won the toss and elected to bat.; Points: Goa 7, Chandigarh 0

15–18 October 2025	Punjab	v	Madhya Pradesh	Match drawn
Scorecard	232 (84.3 overs); Uday Saharan 75 (169); Saransh Jain 6/75 (31.3 overs)		519/8d (146 overs); Rajat Patidar 205 (332); Prerit Dutta 4/145 (39 overs)	Emerald Heights International School Ground, Indore; Umpires: Abhijit Bhattacharya and Vinod Seshan; Player of the match: Rajat Patidar (Madhya Pradesh)
Scorecard	143/5 (63.2 overs); Uday Saharan 36 (93); Shubham Sharma 3/20 (9 overs)			Emerald Heights International School Ground, Indore; Umpires: Abhijit Bhattacharya and Vinod Seshan; Player of the match: Rajat Patidar (Madhya Pradesh)
Punjab won the toss and elected to bat.; Points: Punjab 1, Madhya Pradesh 3

15–18 October 2025	Karnataka	v	Saurashtra	Match drawn
Scorecard	372 (117.3 overs); Devdutt Padikkal 96 (141); Dharmendrasinh Jadeja 7/124 (42 overs)		376 (121.3 overs); Chirag Jani 90 (148); Shreyas Gopal 8/110 (39.3 overs)	Niranjan Shah Stadium, Rajkot; Umpires: Kannur Swaroopanand and Kaushik Gandhi; Player of the match: Dharmendrasinh Jadeja (Saurashtra)
Scorecard	232 (74.2 overs); Mayank Agarwal 64 (126); Yuvrajsinh Dodiya 3/40 (15.2 overs)		128/5 (43 overs); Sammar Gajjar 43* (110); Shreyas Gopal 3/43 (15 overs)	Niranjan Shah Stadium, Rajkot; Umpires: Kannur Swaroopanand and Kaushik Gandhi; Player of the match: Dharmendrasinh Jadeja (Saurashtra)
Karnataka won the toss and elected to bat; Points: Karnataka 1, Saurashtra 3

==== Round 2 ====
25–28 October 2025	Maharashtra	v	Chandigarh	Maharashtra won by 144 runs
Scorecard	313 (85.5 overs); Ruturaj Gaikwad 116 (163); Abhishek Saini 3/55 (17 overs)		209 (73 overs); Nishunk Birla 56* (99); Vicky Ostwal 6/40 (21 overs)	Cricket Stadium, Sector-16, Chandigarh; Umpires: Nagaraj Ramesh and Prabhakar Rao; Player of the match: Ruturaj Gaikwad (Maharashtra)
Scorecard	359/3 (52 overs); Prithvi Shaw 222 (156); Arjun Azad 1/5 (2 overs)		319 (94.1 overs); Arjun Azad 168 (236); Mukesh Choudhary 4/34 (19 overs)	Cricket Stadium, Sector-16, Chandigarh; Umpires: Nagaraj Ramesh and Prabhakar Rao; Player of the match: Ruturaj Gaikwad (Maharashtra)
Chandigarh won the toss and elected to field.; Points: Maharashtra 6, Chandigarh 0

25–28 October 2025	Karnataka	v	Goa	Match drawn
Scorecard	371 (110.1 overs); Karun Nair 174* (267); Vasuki Koushik 3/35 (27.1 overs)		217 (87.2 overs); Mohit Redkar 53 (77); Vidwath Kaverappa 5/51 (23 overs)	KSCA Navule Stadium, Shimoga; Umpires: Anand Ovalekar and Saurabh Dhote; Player of the match: Karun Nair (Karnataka)
Scorecard			143/1 (46 overs) (f/o); Abhinav Tejrana 73* (126); Vijaykumar Vyshak 1/33 (8 overs)	KSCA Navule Stadium, Shimoga; Umpires: Anand Ovalekar and Saurabh Dhote; Player of the match: Karun Nair (Karnataka)
Goa won the toss and elected to field.; Points: Karnataka 3, Goa 1

25–28 October 2025	Saurashtra	v	Madhya Pradesh	Match drawn
Scorecard	260 (88.4 overs); Chirag Jani 82 (138); Aryan Pandey 4/31 (15.4 overs)		355/9 (135 overs); Yash Dubey 159 (358); Jaydev Unadkat 4/33 (18 overs)	Niranjan Shah Stadium, Rajkot; Umpires: Mohit Krishnadas and Saidharshan Kumar; Player of the match: Yash Dubey (Madhya Pradesh)
Saurashtra won the toss and elected to bat.; Points: Saurashtra 1, Madhya Pradesh 3

25–28 October 2025	Punjab	v	Kerala	Match drawn
Scorecard	436 (163.4 overs); Harnoor Singh 170 (343); Ankit Sharma 4/103 (45.4 overs)		371 (136.2 overs); Ahammed Imran 86 (178); Krish Bhagat 4/52 (22.2 overs)	PCA New Cricket Stadium, Ground B, New Chandigarh; Umpires: Tapan Sharma and Yeshwant Barde; Player of the match: Harnoor Singh (Punjab)
Scorecard	15/0 (7 overs); Prabhsimran Singh 7* (16); Baba Aparajith 0/0 (1 over)			PCA New Cricket Stadium, Ground B, New Chandigarh; Umpires: Tapan Sharma and Yeshwant Barde; Player of the match: Harnoor Singh (Punjab)
Punjab won the toss and elected to bat; Points: Punjab 3, Kerala 1

==== Round 3 ====
01-04 November 2025	Saurashtra	v	Maharashtra	Match drawn
Scorecard	394/5 d (101 overs); Harvik Desai 132 (211); Mukesh Choudhary 2/96 (21 overs)		55/1 (10 overs); Arshin Kulkarni 35* (28); Hiten Kanbi 1/6 (2 overs)	Golf Club Ground, Nashik; Umpires: Tanmay Srivastava and Saidharshan Kumar M G Player of the match: Harvik Desai (Saurashtra)
Maharashtra won the toss and elected to field; Points: Saurashtra 1, Maharashtra 1

01-04 November 2025	Punjab	v	Goa	Match drawn
Scorecard	325 (135.4 overs); Uday Saharan 126 (306); Deepraj Gaonkar 3/34 (18 overs)		494/6 d (117 overs); Suyash Prabhudessai 149 (222); Ayush Goyal 3/87 (27 overs)	PCA New Cricket Stadium, New Chandigarh; Umpires: Shanker S and Paschim Pathak; Player of the match: Suyash Prabhudessai (Goa)
Scorecard	179/4 (63 overs); Nehal Wadhera 55* (128); Darshan Misal 2/57 (19 overs)			PCA New Cricket Stadium, New Chandigarh; Umpires: Shanker S and Paschim Pathak; Player of the match: Suyash Prabhudessai (Goa)
Punjab won the toss and elected to bat; Points: Punjab 1, Goa 3

01-04 November 2025	Madhya Pradesh	v	Chandigarh	Match drawn
Scorecard	384/8 d (106 overs); Harpreet Singh 116 (194); Jagjit Singh 5/69 (20 overs)		310 (95 overs); Raj Bawa 77 (127); Kumar Kartikeya 4/110 (35 overs)	Holkar Stadium, Indore; Umpires: Viswajith Bahuleyan and Saurabh Dhote; Player of the match: Harpreet Singh (Madhya Pradesh)
Scorecard	73/3 (27 overs); Harsh Gawli 33 (45); Nishunk Birla 2/21 (10 overs)			Holkar Stadium, Indore; Umpires: Viswajith Bahuleyan and Saurabh Dhote; Player of the match: Harpreet Singh (Madhya Pradesh)
Chandigarh won the toss and elected to field; Points: Madhya Pradesh 3, Chandigarh 1

01-04 November 2025	Karnataka	v	Kerala	Karnataka won by an innings and 164 runs
Scorecard	586/5 d (167 overs); Karun Nair 233 (389); Nedumankuzhy Basil 2/101 (32 overs)		238 (95 overs); Baba Aparajith 88 (159); Vidwath Kaverappa 4/42 (22 overs)	KCA Cricket Ground, Mangalapuram, Thiruvananthapuram; Umpires: Pranav M Joshi and Yeshwant Barde; Player of the match: Karun Nair (Karnataka)
Scorecard			184 (79.3 overs) (f/o); Eden Apple Tom 39* (68); Mohsin Khan 6/29 (23.3 overs)	KCA Cricket Ground, Mangalapuram, Thiruvananthapuram; Umpires: Pranav M Joshi and Yeshwant Barde; Player of the match: Karun Nair (Karnataka)
Karnataka won the toss and elected to bat; Points: Karnataka 7, Kerala 0

==== Round 4 ====
08-11 November 2025	Karnataka	v	Maharashtra	Match drawn
Scorecard	313 (111 overs); Mayank Agarwal 80 (181); Jalaj Saxena 4/94 (35 overs)		300 (99.2 overs); Jalaj Saxena 72 (147); Shreyas Gopal 4/70 (35 overs)	MCA Cricket Stadium, Gahunje, Pune; Umpires: Jayaraman Madanagopal and Saiyed Khalid; Player of the match: Shreyas Gopal (Karnataka)
Scorecard	310/8d (110 overs); Mayank Agarwal 103 (249); Mukesh Choudhary 3/70 (18 overs)			MCA Cricket Stadium, Gahunje, Pune; Umpires: Jayaraman Madanagopal and Saiyed Khalid; Player of the match: Shreyas Gopal (Karnataka)
Karnataka won the toss and elected to bat; Points: Karnataka 3, Maharashtra 1

08-11 November 2025	Goa	v	Madhya Pradesh	Madhya Pradesh won by 3 wickets
Scorecard	284 (95.5 overs); Suyash Prabhudessai 65 (119); Saransh Jain 4/78 (26 overs)		187 (76 overs); Saransh Jain 48 (119); Vasuki Koushik 5/34 (19 overs)	Goa Cricket Association Academy, Porvorim; Umpires: Rohan Ingavale and Sud Abhiroope; Player of the match: Saransh Jain (Madhya Pradesh)
Scorecard	230 (65.4 overs); Abhinav Tejrana 69 (101); Kumar Kartikeya 5/81 (28 overs)		328/7 (94 overs); Saransh Jain 82* (132); Darshan Misal 2/57 (17 overs)	Goa Cricket Association Academy, Porvorim; Umpires: Rohan Ingavale and Sud Abhiroope; Player of the match: Saransh Jain (Madhya Pradesh)
Goa won the toss and elected to bat; Points: Madhya Pradesh 6, Goa 0

08-10 November 2025	Chandigarh	v	Punjab	Punjab won by 8 wickets
Scorecard	173 (51 overs); Nikhil Thakur 63 (105); Ayush Goyal 4/50 (15 overs)		142 (57.2 overs); Anmol Malhotra 33 (82); Nishunk Birla 4/18 (7.2 overs)	Cricket Stadium, Sector-16, Chandigarh; Umpires: M Madhu and Soshan Soma; Player of the match: Ayush Goyal (Punjab)
Scorecard	195 (68.5 overs); Ankit Kaushik 38 (99); Ayush Goyal 4/48 (17.5 overs)		227/2 (66.4 overs); Uday Saharan 117* (194); Raj Bawa 1/45 (14 overs)	Cricket Stadium, Sector-16, Chandigarh; Umpires: M Madhu and Soshan Soma; Player of the match: Ayush Goyal (Punjab)
Punjab won the toss and elected to field; Points: Punjab 6, Chandigarh 0

08-11 November 2025	Saurashtra	v	Kerala	Match drawn
Scorecard	160 (55.2 overs); Jay Gohil 84 (123); MD Nidheesh 6/20 (13 overs)		233 (74.5 overs); Rohan Kunnummal 80 (96); Jaydev Unadkat 4/42 (16.5 overs)	KCA Cricket Ground, Mangalapuram, Thiruvananthapuram; Umpires: Manu Pasha and Nitin Pandit; Player of the match: MD Nidheesh (Kerala)
Scorecard	402/8d (98 overs); Chirag Jani 152 (204); MD Nidheesh 4/83 (23 overs)		154/3 (63 overs); Varun Nayanar 66* (160); Dharmendrasinh Jadeja 2/52 (27 overs)	KCA Cricket Ground, Mangalapuram, Thiruvananthapuram; Umpires: Manu Pasha and Nitin Pandit; Player of the match: MD Nidheesh (Kerala)
Kerala won the toss and elected to field; Points: Saurashtra 1, Kerala 3

==== Round 5 ====
16–18 November 2025	Maharashtra	v	Punjab	Maharashtra won by an innings and 92 runs
Scorecard	350 (113.3 overs); Arshin Kulkarni 133 (229); Gurnoor Brar 4/115 (25.3 overs)		151 (58.4 overs); Anmol Malhotra 35 (90); Rajvardhan Hangargekar 5/44 (17.4 overs)	PCA New Cricket Stadium, New Chandigarh; Umpires: Donovan Koch and Tapan Sharma; Player of the match: Arshin Kulkarni (Maharashtra)
Scorecard			107 (40.5 overs) (f/o); Abhinav Sharma 23 (39); Vicky Ostwal 6/26 (12)	PCA New Cricket Stadium, New Chandigarh; Umpires: Donovan Koch and Tapan Sharma; Player of the match: Arshin Kulkarni (Maharashtra)
Punjab won the toss and elected to field; Points: Maharashtra 7, Punjab 0

16–19 November 2025	Saurashtra	v	Goa	Saurashtra won by an innings and 47 runs
Scorecard	585/7d (150 overs); Prerak Mankad 155 (181); Darshan Misal 4/195 (46 overs)		358 (106.2 overs); Abhinav Tejrana 118 (167); Yuvrajsinh Dodiya 6/98 (31.2 overs)	Niranjan Shah Stadium Ground C, Rajkot; Umpires: Amit Rana and Saidharshan Kumar; Player of the match: Parth Bhut (Saurashtra)
Scorecard			180 (54.5 overs) (f/o); Manthan Khutkar 36 (72); Parth Bhut 7/56 (17.5)	Niranjan Shah Stadium Ground C, Rajkot; Umpires: Amit Rana and Saidharshan Kumar; Player of the match: Parth Bhut (Saurashtra)
Saurashtra won the toss and elected to bat; Points: Saurashtra 7, Goa 0

16–19 November 2025	Kerala	v	Madhya Pradesh	Match drawn
Scorecard	281 (114.4 overs); Baba Aparajith 98 (186); Arshad Khan 4/54 (20 overs)		192 (77.1 overs); Saransh Jain 67 (129); Eden Apple Tom 4/55 (16 overs)	Holkar Stadium, Indore; Umpires: S Nishaanth and Vinod Seshan; Player of the match: Baba Aparajith (Kerala)
Scorecard	314/5d (84 overs); Sachin Baby 122* (217); Saransh Jain 3/61 (17 overs)		159/8 (69 overs); Saransh Jain 31 (59); Sreehari Nair 4/51 (30 overs)	Holkar Stadium, Indore; Umpires: S Nishaanth and Vinod Seshan; Player of the match: Baba Aparajith (Kerala)
Madhya Pradesh won the toss and elected to field; Points: Kerala 3, Madhya Pradesh 1

16–18 November 2025	Karnataka	v	Chandigarh	Karnataka won by an innings and 185 runs
Scorecard	547/8d (160 overs); Ravichandran Smaran 227* (362); Jagjit Singh 2/70 (24 overs)		222 (63.2 overs); Manan Vohra 106* (161); Shreyas Gopal 7/73 (23 overs)	KSCA Stadium, Hubli; Umpires: Chirra Ravikanthreddy and Nikhil Patwardhan; Player of the match: Ravichandran Smaran (Karnataka)
Scorecard			140 (33.5 overs) (f/o); Shivam Bhambri 43 (47); Shikhar Shetty 5/61 (12.5 overs)	KSCA Stadium, Hubli; Umpires: Chirra Ravikanthreddy and Nikhil Patwardhan; Player of the match: Ravichandran Smaran (Karnataka)
Karnataka won the toss and elected to bat; Points: Karnataka 7, Chandigarh 0

==== Round 6 ====
22–25 January 2026
Scorecard

Goa; 209 (82.1 overs) & 248 (97 overs)	v	Maharashtra; 350 (106 overs) & 109/2 (21.1 overs)

Maharashtra won by 8 wickets
Maharashtra Cricket Association Stadium, Pune
Points: Maharashtra 6, Goa 0

22–25 January 2026
Scorecard

Madhya Pradesh; 323 (116.1 overs) & 229/8d (75.1 overs)	v	Karnataka; 191 (64.1 overs) & 144 (67.5 overs)

Madhya Pradesh won by 217 runs
Three Ovals KSCA Stadium, Alur
Points: Madhya Pradesh 6, Karnataka 0

22–25 January 2026
Scorecard

Saurashtra; 172 (47.1 overs) & 286 (58.5 overs)	v	Punjab; 139 (40.1 overs) & 123 (39 overs)

Saurashtra won by 194 runs
Niranjan Shah Stadium C, Rajkot
Points: Saurashtra 6, Punjab 0

22–25 January 2026
Scorecard

Kerala; 139 (56 overs) & 185 (48 overs)	v	Chandigarh; 416 (115.4 overs)

Chandigarh won by an innings and 92 runs
KCA Cricket Ground, Mangalapuram, Thiruvananthapuram
Points: Chandigarh 7, Kerala 0

==== Round 7 ====
29 January-01 February 2026
Scorecard

Madhya Pradesh; 187 (61 overs) & 258 (76.1 overs)	v	Maharashtra; 179 (54.3 overs) & 133 (36 overs)

Madhya Pradesh won by 133 runs
Holkar Stadium, Indore
Points: Madhya Pradesh 6, Maharashtra 0

29 January-01 February 2026
Scorecard

Goa; 355 (110.4 overs) & 199 (53.3 overs)	v	Kerala; 526/9d (135 overs) & 29/1 (5.5 overs)

Kerala won by 9 wickets
Goa Cricket Association Academy, Porvorim
Points: Kerala 6, Goa 0

29 January-01 February 2026
Scorecard

Punjab; 309 (92 overs) & 256 (101 overs)	v	Karnataka; 316 (110.2 overs) & 252/5 (28 overs)

Karnataka won by 5 wickets
I. S. Bindra Stadium, Mohali
Points: Karnataka 6, Punjab 0

29 January-01 February 2026
Scorecard

Chandigarh; 136 (42.1 overs) & 261 (64 overs)	v	Saurashtra; 453/3d (106.1 overs)

Saurashtra won by an innings and 56 runs
Cricket Stadium, Sector-16, Chandigarh
Points: Saurashtra 7, Chandigarh 0

=== Group C ===
==== Round 1 ====
15-18 October 2025	Uttarakhand	v	Bengal	Bengal won by 8 wickets
Scorecard	213 (72.5 overs); Bhupen Lalwani 71 (128); Suraj Jaiswal 4/54 (19 overs)		323 (108.5 overs); Sudip Chatterjee 98 (264); Devendra Bora 6/79 (25 overs)	Eden Gardens, Kolkata; Umpires: Sundaram Ravi and Bhavesh Patel; Player of the match: Mohammed Shami (Bengal)
Scorecard	265 (96.4 overs); Prashant Chopra 82 (163); Mohammed Shami 4/38 (24.4 overs)		156/2 (29.4 overs); Abhimanyu Easwaran 71* (82); Rajan Kumar 1/20 (5 overs)	Eden Gardens, Kolkata; Umpires: Sundaram Ravi and Bhavesh Patel; Player of the match: Mohammed Shami (Bengal)
Bengal won the toss and elected to field; Points: Bengal 6, Uttarakhand 0

15-17 October 2025	Haryana	v	Railways	Haryana won by 96 runs
Scorecard	171 (55.1 overs); Parth Vats 52 (74); Akash Pandey 3/27 (13 overs)		128 (49.1 overs); Pratham Singh 50 (124); Sumit Kumar 5/16 (10 overs)	Pithwala Stadium, Surat; Umpires: Saiyed Khalid and Krishnaraj Srinath; Player of the match: Parth Vats(Haryana)
Scorecard	205 (66.3 overs); Parth Vats 110* (189); Himanshu Sangwan 4/35 (15 overs)		152 (49.4 overs); Suraj Ahuja 44 (61); Nikhil Kashyap 5/53 (15.4 overs)	Pithwala Stadium, Surat; Umpires: Saiyed Khalid and Krishnaraj Srinath; Player of the match: Parth Vats(Haryana)
Haryana won the toss and elected to bat; Points: Haryana 6, Railways 0

15-18 October 2025	Assam	v	Gujarat	Match drawn
Scorecard	310 (132.4 overs); Sibsankar Roy 113 (242); Siddharth Desai 3/68 (39 overs)		382 (112.5 overs); Aarya Desai 101 (152); Riyan Parag 4/86 (33 overs)	Narendra Modi Stadium A Ground, Ahmedabad; Umpires: Tanmay Srivastava and Saidharshan Kumar; Player of the match: Aarya Desai (Gujarat)
Scorecard	192/6 (82 overs); Swarupam Purkayastha 44* (63); Siddharth Desai 2/45 (22 overs)			Narendra Modi Stadium A Ground, Ahmedabad; Umpires: Tanmay Srivastava and Saidharshan Kumar; Player of the match: Aarya Desai (Gujarat)
Assam won the toss and elected to bat; Points: Gujarat 3, Assam 1

15-18 October 2025	Services	v	Tripura	Services won by an innings and 20 runs
Scorecard	359 (133.3 overs); Nakul Sharma 96 (145); Swapnil Singh 5/104 (39.3 overs)		176 (77.5 overs); Vijay Shankar 62 (132); Pulkit Narang 3/33 (25.4 overs)	Palam A Stadium, Delhi; Umpires: Manu Pasha and Mohamed Rafi; Player of the match: Arjun Sharma (Services)
Scorecard			163 (50.4 overs) (f/o); Abhijit Sarkar 35 (22); Arjun Sharma 5/42 (16.4 overs)	Palam A Stadium, Delhi; Umpires: Manu Pasha and Mohamed Rafi; Player of the match: Arjun Sharma (Services)
Services won the toss and elected to bat; Points: Services 7, Tripura 0

==== Round 2 ====
25–28 October 2025	Bengal	v	Gujarat	Bengal won by 141 runs
Scorecard	279 (80.4 overs); Sumanta Gupta 63 (115); Siddharth Desai 4/69 (20.4 overs)		167 (76.3 overs); Manan Hingrajia 80* (252); Shahbaz Ahmed 6/34 (19 overs)	Eden Gardens, Kolkata; Umpires: Rajeev Godara and Vineet Kulkarni; Player of the match: Shahbaz Ahmed (Bengal)
Scorecard	214/8d (54 overs); Anustup Majumdar 58 (91); Siddharth Desai 5/61 (21 overs)		185 (45.5 overs); Urvil Patel 109* (124); Mohammed Shami 5/38 (10 overs)	Eden Gardens, Kolkata; Umpires: Rajeev Godara and Vineet Kulkarni; Player of the match: Shahbaz Ahmed (Bengal)
Gujarat won the toss and elected to field; Points: Bengal 6, Gujarat 0

25–26 October 2025	Assam	v	Services	Services won by 8 wickets
Scorecard	103 (17.2 overs); Pradyun Saikia 52 (42); Arjun Sharma 5/46 (6.2 overs)		108 (29.2 overs); Irfan Ali 51* (81); Riyan Parag 5/25 (10 overs)	Tinsukia District Sports Association Ground, Tinsukia; Umpires: Vijay Shirpuram and Chirra Ravikanthreddy; Player of the match: Arjun Sharma (Services)
Scorecard	75 (29.3 overs); Sumit Ghadigaonkar 25 (72); Arjun Sharma 4/20 (9.3 overs)		73/2 (13.5 overs); Ravi Chauhan 20* (8); Riyan Parag 2/31 (7 overs)	Tinsukia District Sports Association Ground, Tinsukia; Umpires: Vijay Shirpuram and Chirra Ravikanthreddy; Player of the match: Arjun Sharma (Services)
Assam won the toss and elected to bat; This was shortest-ever completed Ranji Trophy match in terms of balls bowled (90 overs, 540 balls); Points: Services 6, Assam 0

25–26 October 2025	Tripura	v	Haryana	Haryana won by 9 wickets
Scorecard	126 (48.1 overs); Swapnil Singh 44 (65); Nikhil Kashyap 4/34 (17.1 overs)		158 (43.1 overs); Dheeru Singh 40 (64); Swapnil Singh 7/66 (20.1 overs)	Chaudhry Bansi Lal Cricket Stadium, Lahli; Umpires: Krishnendu Pal and Vaibhav Dhokre; Player of the match: Parth Vats (Haryana)
Scorecard	47 (19.1 overs); Sridam Paul 18 (18); Parth Vats 5/14 (7.1 overs)		18/1 (4.3 overs); Mayank Shandilya 7* (6); Swapnil Singh 1/13 (2.3 overs)	Chaudhry Bansi Lal Cricket Stadium, Lahli; Umpires: Krishnendu Pal and Vaibhav Dhokre; Player of the match: Parth Vats (Haryana)
Tripura won the toss and elected to bat; Points: Haryana 6, Tripura 0

25–28 October 2025	Railways	v	Uttarakhand	Match drawn
Scorecard	333 (120 overs); Mohammad Saif 131 (211); Mayank Mishra 6/84 (33 overs)		398 (158.3 overs); Yuvraj Chaudhary 92 (272); Kunal Yadav 5/85 (36.3 overs)	Kaushiki Cricket Ground, Jim Corbett, Ramnagar; Umpires: M Ashwin Kumar and P Jayapal; Player of the match: Mayank Mishra (Uttarakhand)
Scorecard	85/1 (23 overs); Suraj Ahuja 42* (76); Abhay Negi 1/14 (5 overs)			Kaushiki Cricket Ground, Jim Corbett, Ramnagar; Umpires: M Ashwin Kumar and P Jayapal; Player of the match: Mayank Mishra (Uttarakhand)
Railways won the toss and elected to bat; Points: Railways 1, Uttarakhand 3

==== Round 3 ====
01-04 November 2025	Bengal	v	Tripura	Match drawn
Scorecard	336 (115.5 overs); Sudip Kumar Gharami 108 (250); Manisankar Murasingh 3/56 (27.5 overs)		385 (103.2 overs); Hanuma Vihari 141 (253); Mohammed Kaif 4/79 (24 overs)	MBB Stadium, Agartala; Umpires: M M Srinivasarangan and P Jayapal; Player of the match: Hanuma Vihari (Tripura)
Scorecard	90/3 (24 overs); Shahbaz Ahmed 51* (45); Abhijit Sarkar 2/11 (6 overs)			MBB Stadium, Agartala; Umpires: M M Srinivasarangan and P Jayapal; Player of the match: Hanuma Vihari (Tripura)
Tripura won the toss and elected to field; Points: Bengal 1, Tripura 3

01-04 November 2025	Railways	v	Assam	Match drawn
Scorecard	224 (65 overs); Bhargav Merai 73* (107); Ayushman Malakar 3/42 (12 overs)		209 (64.4 overs); Swarupam Purkayastha 121 (179); Adarsh Singh 6/48 (14.4 overs)	ACA Stadium, Barsapara, Guwahati; Umpires: Nitin Menon and Ch Ravikanthreddy; Player of the match: Adarsh Singh (Railways)
Scorecard	97/1 (23 overs); Suraj Ahuja 57* (72); Swarupam Purkayastha 1/23 (4 overs)			ACA Stadium, Barsapara, Guwahati; Umpires: Nitin Menon and Ch Ravikanthreddy; Player of the match: Adarsh Singh (Railways)
Assam won the toss and elected to field; Points: Railways 3, Assam 1

01-04 November 2025	Gujarat	v	Haryana	Haryana won by 4 wickets
Scorecard	163 (63.5 overs); Kshitij Patel 50 (107); Nikhil Kashyap 3/34 (20 overs)		239 (84.5 overs); Yashvardhan Dalal 55* (93); Siddharth Desai 4/43 (27.5 overs)	Gujarat College Cricket Ground 'A', Ahmedabad; Umpires: J R Madanagopal and Ramesh K N Player of the match: Parth Vats (Haryana)
Scorecard	137 (60.4 overs); Urvil Patel 44 (60); Nikhil Kashyap 4/59 (21.4 overs)		62/6 (28 overs); Parth Vats 14* (27); Vishal Jayswal 3/23 (11 overs)	Gujarat College Cricket Ground 'A', Ahmedabad; Umpires: J R Madanagopal and Ramesh K N Player of the match: Parth Vats (Haryana)
Haryana won the toss and elected to field; Points: Gujarat 0, Haryana 6

01-04 November 2025	Uttarakhand	v	Services	Uttarakhand won by 17 runs
Scorecard	257 (110.2 overs); Jagadeesha Suchith 67 (180); Vikas Yadav 5/53 (30 overs)		223 (88.2 overs); Mohit Ahlawat 75 (164); Mayank Mishra 4/86 (35.2 overs)	Airforce Complex ground, Palam, New Delhi; Umpires: Anantharamakrishnan G S and Nitin Pandit; Player of the match: Jagadeesha Suchith (Uttarakhand)
Scorecard	88 (38 overs); Kunal Chandela 26 (42); Arjun Sharma 6/41 (18 overs)		105 (48.4 overs); Arjun Sharma 23 (83); Mayank Mishra 5/45 (20.4 overs)	Airforce Complex ground, Palam, New Delhi; Umpires: Anantharamakrishnan G S and Nitin Pandit; Player of the match: Jagadeesha Suchith (Uttarakhand)
Uttarakhand won the toss and elected to bat; Points: Uttarakhand 6, Services 0

==== Round 4 ====
08-11 November 2025	Tripura	v	Assam	Match drawn
Scorecard	602/7d (143 overs); Hanuma Vihari 156 (228); Darshan Rajbongshi 3/83 (20 overs)		238 (77.3 overs); Sibsankar Roy 84* (151); Swapnil Singh 3/29 (13.3 overs)	MBB Stadium, Agartala; Umpires: Nagaraj Ramesh and Rohit Singla; Player of the match: Sibsankar Roy (Assam)
Scorecard			367/7 (117.4 overs) (f/o); Denish Das 103 (197); Ajay Sarkar 3/70 (20 overs)	MBB Stadium, Agartala; Umpires: Nagaraj Ramesh and Rohit Singla; Player of the match: Sibsankar Roy (Assam)
Assam won the toss and elected to field; Points: Tripura 3, Assam 1

08-10 November 2025	Services	v	Gujarat	Gujarat won by 6 wickets
Scorecard	248 (115 overs); Shivam Kumar 37 (124); Siddharth Desai 5/74 (35 overs)		256 (85.4 overs); Kshitij Patel 56 (102); Pulkit Narang 5/77 (32 overs)	Gokulbhai Somabhai Patel Stadium, Nadiad; Umpires: Pashchim Pathak and Iqbal Siddiqui; Player of the match: Vishal Jayswal (Gujarat)
Scorecard	125 (37.3 overs); Mohit Ahlawat 56 (70); Vishal Jayswal 6/59 (16.3 overs)		118/4 (21.2 overs); Kshitij Patel 36* (73); Amit Shukla 4/75 (11 overs)	Gokulbhai Somabhai Patel Stadium, Nadiad; Umpires: Pashchim Pathak and Iqbal Siddiqui; Player of the match: Vishal Jayswal (Gujarat)
Services won the toss and elected to bat; Points: Gujarat 6, Services 0

08-11 November 2025	Bengal	v	Railways	Bengal won by an innings and 120 runs
Scorecard	474 (129.3 overs); Anustup Majumdar 135 (182); Kunal Yadav 4/98 (26.3 overs)		222 (86.3 overs); Bhargav Merai 91 (194); Suraj Sindhu Jaiswal 4/35 (17 overs)	Lalbhai Contractor Stadium, Surat; Umpires: Abhijit Deshmukh and Tony Ematty; Player of the match: Anustup Majumdar (Bengal)
Scorecard			132 (55.5 overs) (f/o); Vivek Singh 29 (51); Shahbaz Ahmed 7/56 (22.5)	Lalbhai Contractor Stadium, Surat; Umpires: Abhijit Deshmukh and Tony Ematty; Player of the match: Anustup Majumdar (Bengal)
Bengal won the toss and elected to bat; Points: Bengal 7, Railways 0

08-10 November 2025	Haryana	v	Uttarakhand	Uttarakhand won by an innings and 28 runs
Scorecard	112 (48.1 overs); Yuvraj Singh 30 (72); Jagadeesha Suchith 5/27 (18.1 overs)		288 (94.3 overs); Yuvraj Chaudhary 60 (76); Nikhil Kashyap 3/67 (30.3 overs)	Chaudhry Bansi Lal Cricket Stadium, Lahli; Umpires: Nand Kishore and P Jayapal; Player of the match: Jagadeesha Suchith (Uttarakhand)
Scorecard	148 (60.4 overs); Dheeru Singh 70 (146); Jagadeesha Suchith 6/56 (26.4 overs)			Chaudhry Bansi Lal Cricket Stadium, Lahli; Umpires: Nand Kishore and P Jayapal; Player of the match: Jagadeesha Suchith (Uttarakhand)
Haryana won the toss and elected to bat; Points: Uttarakhand 7, Haryana 0

==== Round 5 ====
16–18 November 2025	Tripura	v	Railways	Railways won by an innings and 117 runs
Scorecard	136 (41 overs); Vijay Shankar 44* (51); Raj Choudhary 4/30 (9 overs)		446/9d (127 overs); Bhargav Merai 160 (263); Abhijit Sarkar 4/69 (21 overs)	Sardar Patel Stadium, Valsad; Umpires: Manu Pasha and Rajesh Kannan; Player of the match: Raj Choudhary (Railways)
Scorecard	193 (68.3 overs); Swapnil Singh 41 (79); Raj Choudhary 5/35 (22.3)			Sardar Patel Stadium, Valsad; Umpires: Manu Pasha and Rajesh Kannan; Player of the match: Raj Choudhary (Railways)
Tripura won the toss and elected to bat; Points: Railways 7, Tripura 0

16–19 November 2025	Gujarat	v	Uttarakhand	Gujarat won by 146 runs
Scorecard	324/8d (88.4 overs); Jaymeet Patel 100 (176); Jagmohan Nagarkoti 4/65 (15.4 overs)		272 (74.3 overs); Kunal Chandela 116 (186); Vishal Jayswal 3/29 (8 overs)	Abhimanyu Cricket Academy, Dehradun; Umpires: Keshav S Kolle and Nand Kishore; Player of the match: Jaymeet Patel (Gujarat)
Scorecard	291/5d (66.3 overs); Aarya Desai 80 (144); Mayank Mishra 3/78 (20 overs)		197 (68.4 overs); Aarav Mahajan 60 (129); Vishal Jayswal 4/72 (17 overs)	Abhimanyu Cricket Academy, Dehradun; Umpires: Keshav S Kolle and Nand Kishore; Player of the match: Jaymeet Patel (Gujarat)
Uttarakhand won the toss and elected to field; Points: Gujarat 6, Uttarakhand 0

16–19 November 2025	Assam	v	Bengal	Match drawn
Scorecard	200 (80.2 overs); Swarupam Purkayastha 62 (140); Suraj Sindhu Jaiswal 3/24 (20 overs)		442 (109.1 overs); Shahbaz Ahmed 101 (122); Rituraj Biswas 2/40 (7 overs)	Bengal Cricket Academy Ground, Kalyani; Umpires: M Ashwin Kumar and Pashchim Pathak; Player of the match: Shahbaz Ahmed (Bengal)
Scorecard	282/9 (120.4 overs); Denish Das 73 (133); Shahbaz Ahmed 4/57 (30 overs)			Bengal Cricket Academy Ground, Kalyani; Umpires: M Ashwin Kumar and Pashchim Pathak; Player of the match: Shahbaz Ahmed (Bengal)
Bengal won the toss and elected to field; Points: Assam 1, Bengal 3

16–19 November 2025	Services	v	Haryana	Services won by 211 runs
Scorecard	205 (75.5 overs); Nakul Sharma 41 (88); Rahul Rathee 4/59 (28 overs)		111 (43.2 overs); Ankit Kumar 32 (60); Amit Shukla 8/27 (20 overs)	Chaudhry Bansi Lal Cricket Stadium, Lahli; Umpires: DL Deepak and Madanagopal Kuppuraj; Player of the match: Amit Shukla (Services)
Scorecard	283/7d (108 overs); Rajat Paliwal 61 (127); Mayank Shandilya 2/38 (10 overs)		166 (43.4 overs); Yashvardhan Dalal 49 (48); Pulkit Narang 5/66 (18)	Chaudhry Bansi Lal Cricket Stadium, Lahli; Umpires: DL Deepak and Madanagopal Kuppuraj; Player of the match: Amit Shukla (Services)
Haryana won the toss and elected to field; Points: Services 6, Haryana 0

==== Round 6 ====
22–25 January 2026
Scorecard

Tripura; 266 (82.1 overs) & 258 (90.3 overs)	v	Uttarakhand; 301 (88.2 overs) & 224/1 (65 overs)

Uttarakhand won by 9 wickets
Maharaja Bir Bikram College Stadium, Agartala
Points: Uttarakhand 6, Tripura 0

22–25 January 2026
Scorecard

Gujarat; 175 (55.4 overs) & 347 (89.4 overs)	v	Railways; 424 (100.5 overs) & 99/2 (20.5 overs)

Railways won by 8 wickets
Gokulbhai Somabhai Patel Stadium, Nadiad
Points: Railways 6, Gujarat 0

22–25 January 2026
Scorecard

Bengal; 519 (135 overs)	v	Services; 186 (53.5 overs) & 287 (75 overs) (f/o)

Bengal won by an innings and 46 runs
Bengal Cricket Academy Ground, Kalyani, West Bengal
Points: Bengal 7, Services 0

22–25 January 2026
Scorecard

Assam; 247 (118.5 overs) & 158 (64.3 overs)	v	Haryana; 236 (71.3 overs) & 175/1 (29.3 overs)

Haryana won by 9 wickets
ACA Cricket Academy Ground, Fulung, North Guwahati
Points: Haryana 6, Assam 0

==== Round 7 ====
29 January-01 February 2026
Scorecard

Gujarat; 352 (115.4 overs) & 252/9d (68.5 overs)	v	Tripura; 427 (119 overs) & 179/6 (27.1 overs)

Tripura won by 4 wickets
MBB Stadium, Agartala
Points: Tripura 6, Gujarat 0

29 January-01 February 2026
Scorecard

Bengal; 193 (72.3 overs) & 200 (56.5 overs)	v	Haryana; 100 (31.1 overs) & 105 (26.1 overs)

Bengal won by 188 runs
Chaudhary Bansi Lal Cricket Stadium, Lahli
Points: Bengal 6, Haryana 0

29 January-01 February 2026
Scorecard

Uttarakhand; 460/7d (120 overs)	v	Assam; 140 (69.1 overs) & 278 (82.5 overs) (f/o)

Uttarakhand won by an innings and 42 runs
Abhimanyu Cricket Academy, Dehradun
Points: Uttarakhand 7, Assam 0

29 January-01 February 2026
Scorecard

Services; 343 (103.4 overs) & 168/8d (58.4 overs)	v	Railways; 212 (51 overs) & 298/7 (95.1 overs)

Railways won by 3 wickets
Palam A Ground, Model Sports Complex, Delhi
Points: Railways 6, Services 0

=== Group D ===
==== Round 1 ====
15–18 October 2025	Himachal Pradesh	v	Pondicherry	Match drawn
Scorecard	305 (107.3 overs); Mayank Dagar 83 (107); Sagar Udeshi 7/88 (41.3 overs)		183 (59.2 overs); Puneet Datey 43 (74); Aryaman Singh 3/45 (22 overs)	Siechem Stadium, Puducherry; Umpires: Akshay Totre and Anil Dandekar; Player of the match: Mayank Dagar (Himachal Pradesh)
Scorecard	91/4 (17 overs); Ekant Sen 30* (29); Sagar Udeshi 3/34 (9 overs)			Siechem Stadium, Puducherry; Umpires: Akshay Totre and Anil Dandekar; Player of the match: Mayank Dagar (Himachal Pradesh)
Himachal Pradesh won the toss and elected to bat; Points: Himachal Pradesh 3, Pondicherry 1

15–18 October 2025	Mumbai	v	Jammu & Kashmir	Mumbai won by 35 runs
Scorecard	386 (101.4 overs); Siddhesh Lad 116 (156); Yudhvir Singh 5/96 (21 overs)		325 (75.1 overs); Paras Dogra 144 (208); Tushar Deshpande 3/57 (19 overs)	Sher E Kashmir Cricket Stadium, Srinagar; Umpires: Irfan Umair and Abhijeet Bengeri; Player of the match: Shams Mulani (Mumbai)
Scorecard	181 (56.5 overs); Shams Mulani 41 (108); Auqib Nabi 5/52 (16 overs)		207 (64.4 overs); Qamran Iqbal 56 (107); Shams Mulani 7/46 (20.4 overs)	Sher E Kashmir Cricket Stadium, Srinagar; Umpires: Irfan Umair and Abhijeet Bengeri; Player of the match: Shams Mulani (Mumbai)
Jammu & Kashmir won the toss and elected to field; Points: Mumbai 6, Jammu & Kashmir 0

15-18 October 2025	Chhattisgarh	v	Rajasthan	Rajasthan won by 9 wickets
Scorecard	332 (101.3 overs); Ajay Mandal 144 (229); Aniket Choudhary 3/67 (21 overs)		386 (128 overs); Deepak Hooda 130 (210); Ravi Kiran 4/68 (27 overs)	Madan Paliwal Miraj Sports Centre, Rajsamand; Umpires: Abhijit Deshmukh and Chettithody Shamshuddin; Player of the match: Manav Suthar(Rajasthan)
Scorecard	109 (49.3 overs); Aayush Pandey 27 (54); Manav Suthar 8/42 (22.3 overs)		58/1 (11.1 overs); Mahipal Lomror 35* (34); Aditya Sarwate 1/19 (4 overs)	Madan Paliwal Miraj Sports Centre, Rajsamand; Umpires: Abhijit Deshmukh and Chettithody Shamshuddin; Player of the match: Manav Suthar(Rajasthan)
Rajasthan won the toss and elected to field; Points: Rajasthan 6, Chhattisgarh 0

15–18 October 2025	Delhi	v	Hyderabad	Match drawn
Scorecard	529/4d (151 overs); Sanat Sangwan 211 (470); Chama Milind 3/57 (18 overs)		411 (112.2 overs); Tanmay Agarwal 132 (196); Ayush Badoni 6/73 (24.2 overs)	NexGen Cricket Ground, Hyderabad; Umpires: Anish Sahasrabudhe and Sivasubramaniyan Shankar; Player of the match: Sanat Sangwan(Delhi)
Scorecard	138/3 (42 overs); Sanat Sangwan 56 (105); Kodimela Himateja 1/6 (5 overs)			NexGen Cricket Ground, Hyderabad; Umpires: Anish Sahasrabudhe and Sivasubramaniyan Shankar; Player of the match: Sanat Sangwan(Delhi)
Hyderabad won the toss and elected to field; Points: Delhi 3, Hyderabad 1

==== Round 2 ====
25–28 October 2025	Hyderabad	v	Pondicherry	Match drawn
Scorecard	435 (134.5 overs); Rahul Singh 114 (175); Sagar Udeshi 4/110 (39 overs)		126 (45.5 overs); Anand Bais 41 (77); Tanay Thyagarajan 4/48 (13.5 overs)	CAP Ground 2, Puducherry; Umpires: Kamlesh Sharma and Milind Bhatt; Player of the match: Rahul Singh (Hyderabad)
Scorecard			97/5 (42 overs) (f/o); Ganga Sridhar Raju 27 (30); Tanay Thyagarajan 2/35 (18 overs)	CAP Ground 2, Puducherry; Umpires: Kamlesh Sharma and Milind Bhatt; Player of the match: Rahul Singh (Hyderabad)
Hyderabad won the toss and elected to bat; Points: Hyderabad 3, Pondicherry 1

25–28 October 2025	Mumbai	v	Chhattisgarh	Match drawn
Scorecard	416 (133.3 overs); Ajinkya Rahane 159 (303); Aditya Sarwate 5/103 (41.3 overs)		217 (76.5 overs); Aayush Pandey 50 (89); Shams Mulani 5/59 (26.5 overs)	BKC Ground, Mumbai; Umpires: Bhavesh Patel and Nikhil Menon; Player of the match: Ajinkya Rahane (Mumbai)
Scorecard			201/3 (58 overs) (f/o); Aayush Pandey 117* (171); Himanshu Singh 1/65 (23 overs)	BKC Ground, Mumbai; Umpires: Bhavesh Patel and Nikhil Menon; Player of the match: Ajinkya Rahane (Mumbai)
Chhattisgarh won the toss and elected to field; Points: Mumbai 3, Chhattisgarh 1

25–27 October 2025	Rajasthan	v	Jammu & Kashmir	Jammu & Kashmir won by an innings and 41 runs
Scorecard	152 (52.5 overs); Mahipal Lomror 37* (76); Sunil Kumar 4/32 (14.5 overs)		282 (70.4 overs); Abdul Samad 76 (118); Deepak Chahar 4/39 (14 overs)	Sher E Kashmir Cricket Stadium, Srinagar; Umpires: Nikhil Patwardhan and Pashchim Pathak; Player of the match: Auqib Nabi (Jammu & Kashmir)
Scorecard	89 (29.5 overs); Deepak Hooda 28 (50); Auqib Nabi 7/24 (11 overs)			Sher E Kashmir Cricket Stadium, Srinagar; Umpires: Nikhil Patwardhan and Pashchim Pathak; Player of the match: Auqib Nabi (Jammu & Kashmir)
Jammu & Kashmir won the toss and elected to field; Points: Jammu & Kashmir 7, Rajasthan 0

25–28 October 2025	Delhi	v	Himachal Pradesh	Match drawn
Scorecard	430 (116 overs); Sanat Sangwan 79 (170); Vaibhav Arora 4/78 (24 overs)		297 (91.4 overs); Sidhant Purohit 70 (165); Navdeep Saini 3/52 (17 overs)	Arun Jaitley Stadium, New Delhi; Umpires: Bahuleyan Viswajith and Sadashiv Iyer; Player of the match: Ayush Doseja (Delhi)
Scorecard	209/4d (33.3 overs); Yash Dhull 70 (59); Mukul Negi 3/57 (11 overs)		168/2 (46 overs); Ankush Bains 81* (139); Money Grewal 2/31 (7 overs)	Arun Jaitley Stadium, New Delhi; Umpires: Bahuleyan Viswajith and Sadashiv Iyer; Player of the match: Ayush Doseja (Delhi)
Himachal Pradesh won the toss and elected to field; Points: Delhi 3, Himachal Pradesh 1

==== Round 3 ====
01-04 November 2025	Jammu & Kashmir	v	Chhattisgarh	Match drawn
Scorecard	394 (122.1 overs); Shubham Khajuria 190 (344); Ravi Kiran 7/82 (27 overs)		505/9 d (168.2 overs); Amandeep Khare 156 (313); Vanshaj Sharma 3/110 (49.2 overs)	Shaheed Veer Narayan Singh International Stadium, Raipur; Umpires: Rajeev Godara and R Rajesh Kannan; Player of the match: Ravi Kiran (Chhattisgarh)
Chhattisgarh won the toss and elected to field; Points: Jammu & Kashmir 1, Chhattisgarh 3

01-04 November 2025	Delhi	v	Pondicherry	Match drawn
Scorecard	294 (94.1 overs); Sanat Sangwan 99 (230); Sagar Udeshi 4/36 (13.1 overs)		481 (117.1 overs); Ajay Rohera 151 (205); Sumit Mathur 3/77 (27.1 overs)	Arun Jaitley Stadium, New Delhi; Umpires: K Prabhakar Rao and Nikhil Patwardhan; Player of the match: Ajay Rohera (Pondicherry)
Scorecard	321/0 (81 overs); Arpit Rana 170* (275); Gaurav Yadav 0/8 (4 overs)			Arun Jaitley Stadium, New Delhi; Umpires: K Prabhakar Rao and Nikhil Patwardhan; Player of the match: Ajay Rohera (Pondicherry)
Pondicherry won the toss and elected to field; Points: Delhi 1, Pondicherry 3

01-04 November 2025	Mumbai	v	Rajasthan	Match drawn
Scorecard	254 (76.3 overs); Yashasvi Jaiswal 67 (97); Kukna Ajay Singh 4/66 (16.3 overs)		617/6 d (153.3 overs); Deepak Hooda 248 (335); Tushar Deshpande 2/67 (22 overs)	Sawai Mansingh Stadium, Jaipur; Umpires: Mohit Krishnadas and Virender Sharma; Player of the match: Deepak Hooda (Rajasthan)
Scorecard	269/3 (82 overs); Yashasvi Jaiswal 156 (174); Kukna Ajay Singh 2/61 (30 overs)			Sawai Mansingh Stadium, Jaipur; Umpires: Mohit Krishnadas and Virender Sharma; Player of the match: Deepak Hooda (Rajasthan)
Rajasthan won the toss and elected to field; Points: Mumbai 1, Rajasthan 3

01-04 November 2025	Himachal Pradesh	v	Hyderabad	Hyderabad won by 4 wickets
Scorecard	313 (97.3 overs); Akash Vasisht 118 (165); Tanay Thyagarajan 4/80 (28.3 overs)		278 (75.2 overs); Chama Milind 98 (139); Vaibhav Arora 4/51 (16.2 overs)	Atal Bihari Vajpayee Cricket Stadium, Amtar; Umpires: Tony Emmatty and Vineet Kulkarni; Player of the match: Abhirath Reddy (Hyderabad)
Scorecard	303 (70.2 overs); Akash Vasisht 101* (169); Chama Milind 3/67 (14 overs)		347/6 (75.3 overs); Abhirath Reddy 175* (200); Aryaman Singh 3/91 (20.3 overs)	Atal Bihari Vajpayee Cricket Stadium, Amtar; Umpires: Tony Emmatty and Vineet Kulkarni; Player of the match: Abhirath Reddy (Hyderabad)
Himachal Pradesh won the toss and elected to bat; Points: Hyderabad 6, Himachal Pradesh 0

==== Round 4 ====
08-10 November 2025	Chhattisgarh	v	Pondicherry	Chhattisgarh won by 10 wickets
Scorecard	377 (136 overs); Mayank Verma 121* (203); Sagar Udeshi 3/74 (43 overs)		205 (60.3 overs); Paras Ratnaparkhe 52 (113); Ravi Kiran 3/51 (18 overs)	Shaheed Veer Narayan Singh International Stadium, Raipur; Umpires: Mihir Parmar and Sivasubramaniyan Shankar; Player of the match: Mayank Verma (Chhattisgarh)
Scorecard	4/0 (0.1 overs); Aayush Pandey 4* (1); Jayant Yadav 0/4 (0.1 overs)		175 (51.1 overs) (f/o); Jayant Yadav 46 (79); Aditya Sarwate 4/27 (17 overs)	Shaheed Veer Narayan Singh International Stadium, Raipur; Umpires: Mihir Parmar and Sivasubramaniyan Shankar; Player of the match: Mayank Verma (Chhattisgarh)
Pondicherry won the toss and elected to field; Points: Chhattisgarh 7, Puducherry 0

08-10 November 2025	Mumbai	v	Himachal Pradesh	Mumbai won by an innings and 120 runs
Scorecard	446 (137.2 overs); Siddhesh Lad 127 (260); Mayank Dagar 4/111 (48.2 overs)		187 (65.5 overs); Nikhil Gangta 64* (130); Himanshu Singh 3/54 (12 overs)	BKC Ground, Mumbai; Umpires: KN Ananthapadmanabhan and Navdeep Singh; Player of the match: Musheer Khan (Mumbai)
Scorecard			139 (49.1 overs) (f/o); Pukhraj Mann 65 (102); Shams Mulani 5/37 (15.1 overs)	BKC Ground, Mumbai; Umpires: KN Ananthapadmanabhan and Navdeep Singh; Player of the match: Musheer Khan (Mumbai)
Mumbai won the toss and elected to bat; Points: Mumbai 7, Himachal Pradesh 0

08-11 November 2025	Delhi	v	Jammu & Kashmir	Jammu & Kashmir won by 7 wickets
Scorecard	211 (69 overs); Ayush Doseja 65 (143); Auqib Nabi 5/35 (16 overs)		310 (91.2 overs); Paras Dogra 106 (183); Simarjeet Singh 6/52 (16.2 overs)	Arun Jaitley Stadium, New Delhi; Umpires: Sadashiv Iyer and Ulhas Gandhe; Player of the match: Auqib Nabi (Jammu & Kashmir)
Scorecard	277 (69.1 overs); Ayush Badoni 72 (73); Vanshaj Sharma 6/68 (16.1 overs)		179/3 (43.3 overs); Qamran Iqbal 133* (147); Hrithik Shokeen 2/52 (15.3 overs)	Arun Jaitley Stadium, New Delhi; Umpires: Sadashiv Iyer and Ulhas Gandhe; Player of the match: Auqib Nabi (Jammu & Kashmir)
Jammu & Kashmir won the toss and elected to field; Points: Jammu & Kashmir 6, Delhi 0

08-11 November 2025	Hyderabad	v	Rajasthan	Match drawn
Scorecard	364 (104.1 overs); Rahul Radesh 129 (202); Ashok Sharma 3/89 (19 overs)		269 (94.4 overs); Kunal Singh Rathore 83 (156); Chama Milind 3/44 (17.4 overs)	Rajiv Gandhi International Stadium, Hyderabad; Umpires: Krishnaraj Srinath and Vineet Kulkarni; Player of the match: Rahul Radesh (Hyderabad)
Scorecard	244/9d (78 overs); Rahul Singh 59 (66); Mahipal Lomror 4/51 (20 overs)		207/3 (57 overs); Salman Khan 79 (138); Tanay Thyagarajan 2/72 (23 overs)	Rajiv Gandhi International Stadium, Hyderabad; Umpires: Krishnaraj Srinath and Vineet Kulkarni; Player of the match: Rahul Radesh (Hyderabad)
Hyderabad won the toss and elected to bat; Points: Hyderabad 3, Rajasthan 1

==== Round 5 ====
16–19 November 2025	Mumbai	v	Pondicherry	Mumbai won by an innings and 222 runs
Scorecard	630/5d (147 overs); Siddhesh Lad 170 (185); Sabhay Chadha 2/146 (27 overs)		132 (47.2 overs); Mohit Kale 53 (105); Shardul Thakur 3/22 (9 overs)	Wankhede Stadium, Mumbai; Umpires: Keyur Kelkar and Tony Ematty; Player of the match: Siddhesh Lad (Mumbai)
Scorecard			276 (53.3 overs) (f/o); Aman Khan 86 (44); Tushar Deshpande 3/32 (7)	Wankhede Stadium, Mumbai; Umpires: Keyur Kelkar and Tony Ematty; Player of the match: Siddhesh Lad (Mumbai)
Pondicherry won the toss and elected to field; Points: Mumbai 7, Pondicherry 0

16–19 November 2025	Chhattisgarh	v	Himachal Pradesh	Match drawn
Scorecard	585/6d (158 overs); Anuj Tiwary 162 (260); Mayank Dagar 2/124 (34 overs)		425 (141 overs); Ankit Kalsi 204 (405); Ravi Kiran 6/90 (33)	Atal Bihari Vajpayee Cricket Stadium, Amtar; Umpires: Anish Sahasrabudhe and Nagaraj Ramesh; Player of the match: Ravi Kiran (Chhattisgarh)
Scorecard	15/0 (5 overs); Aayush Pandey 13* (16); Mridul Surroch 0/7 (2)			Atal Bihari Vajpayee Cricket Stadium, Amtar; Umpires: Anish Sahasrabudhe and Nagaraj Ramesh; Player of the match: Ravi Kiran (Chhattisgarh)
Chhattisgarh won the toss and elected to bat; Points: Chhattisgarh 3, Himachal Pradesh 1

16–19 November 2025	Jammu & Kashmir	v	Hyderabad	Jammu & Kashmir won by 281 runs
Scorecard	170 (47.1 overs); Abid Mushtaq 57 (49); Tanay Thyagarajan 3/19 (9.1 overs)		121 (39.2 overs); Rahul Singh 48 (84); Sunil Kumar 5/29 (13.2 overs)	Hostel Ground JKCA, Jammu; Umpires: Navdeep Singh and Yashodan Gavankar; Player of the match: Abdul Samad (Jammu & Kashmir)
Scorecard	422 (100.5 overs); Abdul Samad 125 (200); Tanay Thyagarajan 4/87 (24.5 overs)		190 (57.5 overs); Tanmay Agarwal 47 (81); Abid Mushtaq 7/68 (18.5)	Hostel Ground JKCA, Jammu; Umpires: Navdeep Singh and Yashodan Gavankar; Player of the match: Abdul Samad (Jammu & Kashmir)
Hyderabad won the toss and elected to field; Points: Jammu & Kashmir 6, Hyderabad 0

16–19 November 2025	Rajasthan	v	Delhi	Match drawn
Scorecard	570/7d (161 overs); Sachin Yadav 130 (257); Simarjeet Singh 3/81 (26 overs)		296 (92.2 overs); Arpit Rana 62 (99); Jaideep Singh 3/36 (14 overs)	Madan Paliwal Miraj Sports Centre, Rajsamand; Umpires: Anil Dandekar and Sadashiv Iyer; Player of the match: Yash Dhull (Delhi)
Scorecard			316/7 (87 overs) (f/o); Yash Dhull 189 (242); Kukna Ajay Singh 3/92 (33 overs)	Madan Paliwal Miraj Sports Centre, Rajsamand; Umpires: Anil Dandekar and Sadashiv Iyer; Player of the match: Yash Dhull (Delhi)
Delhi won the toss and elected to field; Points: Rajasthan 3, Delhi 1

==== Round 6 ====
22–25 January 2026	Pondicherry	v	Jammu & Kashmir	Match drawn
Scorecard	233 (86.4 overs); Ajay Rohera 94 (211); Sunil Kumar 3/26 (14 overs)		150/6 (60 overs); Shubham Khajuria 46 (107); Sagar Udeshi 2/41 (23 overs)	Siechem Stadium, Puducherry; Umpires: Parashar Joshi and Nikhil Patwardhan; Player of the match: Ajay Rohera (Puducherry)
Puducherry won the toss and elected to bat.; Dikshant Kundal and Ragavan both made their first-class debut.; Points: Jammu & Kashmir 1, Puducherry 1

22–25 January 2026	Mumbai	v	Hyderabad	Mumbai won by 9 wickets
Scorecard	560 (123.2 overs); Sarfaraz Khan 227 (219); Rakshan Readdi 4/107 (24 overs)		267 (82.2 overs); Rahul Singh 96 (164); Himanshu Singh 3/39 (27 overs)	Rajiv Gandhi International Stadium, Hyderabad; Umpires: Saurabh Dhote and Navdeep Singh; Player of the match: Sarfaraz Khan (Mumbai)
Scorecard	12/1 (3.2 overs); Akash Anand 5* (6); Nitin Sai Yadav 1/6 (2 overs)		302 (69.5 overs) (f/o); Chama Milind 85 (128); Musheer Khan 5/79 (22.5 overs)	Rajiv Gandhi International Stadium, Hyderabad; Umpires: Saurabh Dhote and Navdeep Singh; Player of the match: Sarfaraz Khan (Mumbai)
Hyderabad won the toss and elected to field.; Aman Rao, Nitin Sai Yadav and Onkar Tarmale all made their first-class debuts.; Points: Mumbai 6, Hyderabad 0

22–25 January 2026
Scorecard

Delhi; 216 (67.5 overs) & 422 (102.3 overs)	v	Chhattisgarh; 505 (156.5 overs) & 57/3 (8 overs)

Match drawn
BCCI COE Ground 1, Bengaluru
Points: Chhattisgarh 3, Delhi 1

22–25 January 2026
Scorecard

Himachal Pradesh; 406 (122.1 overs) & 243/8d (58 overs)	v	Rajasthan; 342 (131.2 overs) & 100/5 (40 overs)

Match drawn
Madan Paliwal Miraj Sports Centre, Rajsamand
Points: Himachal Pradesh 3, Rajasthan 1

==== Round 7 ====
29 January-01 February 2026
Scorecard

Rajasthan; 168 (61.1 overs) & 352 (94.3 overs)	v	Pondicherry; 349 (93.2 overs) & 172 (44.1 overs)

Puducherry won by 5 wickets
Siechem Stadium, Puducherry
Points: Puducherry 6, Rajasthan 0

29 January-01 February 2026
Scorecard

Delhi; 221 (76.4 overs) & 407/6d (105 overs)	v	Mumbai; 317 (103.2 overs) & ( overs)

Match drawn
Sharad Pawar Cricket Academy BKC, Mumbai
Points: Delhi 0, Mumbai 3

29 January-01 February 2026
Scorecard

Chhattisgarh; 283 (72.3 overs) & 411/8 (122 overs)	v	Hyderabad; 631 (154 overs)

Match drawn
Gymkhana Ground, Hyderabad
Points: Chhattisgarh 0, Hyderabad 3

29 January-01 February 2026
Scorecard

Himachal Pradesh; 168 (60.1 overs) & 26/2 (9 overs)	v	Jammu & Kashmir; 771 (182.1 overs)

Match drawn
Atal Bihari Vajpayee Stadium, Amtar
Points: Himachal Pradesh 1, Jammu & Kashmir 3

=== Plate group ===
==== Round 1 ====
15-18 October 2025	Sikkim	v	Manipur	Match drawn
Scorecard	308 (106.5 overs); Gurinder Singh 83 (180); Bishworjit Konthoujam 4/69 (26 overs)		340 (118.5 overs); Kangabam Priyojit 102 (204); Gurinder Singh 5/72 (38 overs)	SICA ground, Rangpo; Umpires: Indranil Chakravarti and Ranjeev Sharma; Player of the match: Kangabam Priyojit (Manipur)
Scorecard	329/6 (107.5 overs); Gurinder Singh 100* (164); Bishworjit Konthoujam 1/13 (6.2 overs)			SICA ground, Rangpo; Umpires: Indranil Chakravarti and Ranjeev Sharma; Player of the match: Kangabam Priyojit (Manipur)
Sikkim won the toss and elected to bat; Points: Sikkim 1, Manipur 3

15-18 October 2025	Meghalaya	v	Mizoram	Match abandoned without a ball bowled
Scorecard				MCA Cricket Ground, Polo Ground, Shillong; Umpires: Dharmesh Bhardwaj and Vinod Ingle
Points: Meghalaya 1, Mizoram 1

15-17 October 2025	Arunachal Pradesh	v	Bihar	Bihar won by an innings and 165 runs
Scorecard	105 (32.3 overs); Siddharth Balodi 24 (43); Sakib Hussain 6/41 (11.3 overs)		542/9d (116.3 overs); Ayush Loharuka 226 (247); Techi Neri 3/70 (15 overs)	Moin-ul-Haq Stadium, Patna; Umpires: Prakash Kumar and Rajesh Timaney; Player of the match: Ayush Loharuka(Bihar)
Scorecard	272 (75.3 overs); Techi Neri 128 (179); Sakib Hussain 4/58 (16 overs)			Moin-ul-Haq Stadium, Patna; Umpires: Prakash Kumar and Rajesh Timaney; Player of the match: Ayush Loharuka(Bihar)
Arunachal Pradesh won the toss and elected to bat; Points: Bihar 7, Arunachal Pradesh 0

==== Round 2 ====
25–28 October 2025	Sikkim	v	Meghalaya	Match drawn
Scorecard	346 (96 overs); Gurinder Singh 129 (170); Akash Choudhary 5/85 (28 overs)		405 (123.3 overs); Arpit Bhatewara 200 (363); Kranthi Kumar 6/86 (33.3 overs)	MCA Cricket Ground, Polo Ground, Shillong; Umpires: GS Ananth Ramakrishnan and Prahlad Rawat; Player of the match: Arpit Bhatewara (Meghalaya)
Scorecard	303/7 (88.4 overs); Ashish Thapa 117 (189); Akash Choudhary 3/56 (24 overs)			MCA Cricket Ground, Polo Ground, Shillong; Umpires: GS Ananth Ramakrishnan and Prahlad Rawat; Player of the match: Arpit Bhatewara (Meghalaya)
Meghalaya won the toss and elected to field; Points: Sikkim 1, Meghalaya 3

25–28 October 2025	Manipur	v	Bihar	Match drawn
Scorecard	387/6 (117 overs); Kangabam Priyojit 186* (269); Amod Yadav 2/53 (19 overs)			Gokulbhai Somabhai Patel Stadium, Nadiad; Umpires: KR Vasuki and Manish Jain
Manipur won the toss and elected to bat; Points: Manipur 1, Bihar 1

25–28 October 2025	Arunachal Pradesh	v	Mizoram	Mizoram won by an innings and 58 runs
Scorecard	187 (65 overs); Siddharth Balodi 35 (75); Lalrempuia 3/47 (19 overs)		389/6d (115 overs); Armaan Jaffer 144 (163); Yab Niya 2/62 (19 overs)	Gujarat College Cricket Ground 'A', Ahmedabad; Umpires: MM Srinivasa Rangan and Yashodan Gavankar; Player of the match: Lalrempuia (Mizoram)
Scorecard	144 (49.4 overs); Techi Neri 91 (110); Lalrempuia 5/63 (17 overs)			Gujarat College Cricket Ground 'A', Ahmedabad; Umpires: MM Srinivasa Rangan and Yashodan Gavankar; Player of the match: Lalrempuia (Mizoram)
Mizoram won the toss and elected to field; Points: Mizoram 7, Arunachal Pradesh 0

==== Round 3 ====
01-04 November 2025	Meghalaya	v	Bihar	Match drawn
Scorecard	408/7 d (141 overs); Ajay Duhan 129 (217); Himanshu Singh 3/126 (52 overs)		156/4 (25 overs); Vaibhav Suryavanshi 93 (67); Bijon Dey 2/47 (9 overs)	Moin-ul-Haq Stadium, Patna; Umpires: Ranjeev Sharma and Kamlesh Sharma
Bihar won the toss and elected to field; Points: Meghalaya 1, Bihar 1

01-03 November 2025	Manipur	v	Arunachal Pradesh	Manipur won by an innings and 119 runs
Scorecard	505/3 d (106.2 overs); Karnajit Yumnam 146 (189); Yorjum Sera 2/96 (19 overs)		247 (78 overs); Licha Jhon 59 (151); Bishworjit Konthoujam 4/41 (19 overs)	Narendra Modi Stadium Ground 'B', Motera, Ahmedabad; Umpires: Krishnendu Pal and Ganesh Charhate; Player of the match: Karnajit Yumnam (Manipur)
Scorecard			139 (48.3 overs) (f/o); Techi Neri 37 (69); Bishworjit Konthoujam 4/27 (15 overs)	Narendra Modi Stadium Ground 'B', Motera, Ahmedabad; Umpires: Krishnendu Pal and Ganesh Charhate; Player of the match: Karnajit Yumnam (Manipur)
Arunachal Pradesh won the toss and elected to field; Points: Manipur 7, Arunachal Pradesh 0

01-04 November 2025	Mizoram	v	Sikkim	Match drawn
Scorecard	424 (105 overs); Armaan Jaffer 178 (252); Kranthi Kumar 4/75 (21 overs)		427/8 (142.4 overs); Robin Limboo 60 (229); Khiangte Vanrotlinga 2/60 (23 overs)	Lal Bahadur Shastri Stadium, Anand; Umpires: Amit Bansal and Anmol Sharda; Player of the match: Kranthi Kumar (Sikkim)
Sikkim won the toss and elected to field; Points: Mizoram 1, Sikkim 3

==== Round 4 ====
08-11 November 2025	Bihar	v	Sikkim	Match drawn
Scorecard	265 (77.4 overs); Sakibul Gani 66 (74); Ankur Malik 5/81 (26 overs)		429 (143.5 overs); Kranthi Kumar 137 (243); Suraj Kashyap 4/142 (51 overs)	SICA Ground, Rangpo; Umpires: Chirra Ravikanthreddy and Mukund Mandale; Player of the match: Robin Limboo (Sikkim)
Scorecard	392/6 (115.1 overs); Bipin Saurabh 100* (141); Ankur Malik 3/149 (42 overs)			SICA Ground, Rangpo; Umpires: Chirra Ravikanthreddy and Mukund Mandale; Player of the match: Robin Limboo (Sikkim)
Bihar won the toss and elected to bat; Points: Bihar 1, Sikkim 3

08-10 November 2025	Manipur	v	Mizoram	Manipur won by 5 wickets
Scorecard	400 (133.1 overs); Al Bashid Muhammed 126 (243); Joseph Lalthankhuma 2/31 (11.1 overs)		143 (51.4 overs); Lalhruaizela 42* (74); Bishworjit Konthoujam 3/23 (14 overs)	Lal Bahadur Shastri Stadium, Anand; Umpires: Premdip Chatterjee and Sanjay Kumar Singh; Player of the match: Al Bashid Muhammed (Manipur)
Scorecard	12/5 (5 overs); Karnajit Yumnam 6 (10); Bobby Zothansanga 3/5 (2 overs)		268 (73.5 overs) (f/o); Armaan Jaffer 81 (91); L Kishan Singha 5/95 (25.5 overs)	Lal Bahadur Shastri Stadium, Anand; Umpires: Premdip Chatterjee and Sanjay Kumar Singh; Player of the match: Al Bashid Muhammed (Manipur)
Mizoram won the toss and elected to field; Points: Manipur 6, Mizoram 0

08-10 November 2025	Meghalaya	v	Arunchal Pradesh	Meghalaya won by an innings and 446 runs
Scorecard	628/6d (127 overs); Arpit Bhatewara 207 (273); TNR Mohith 3/160 (26 overs)		73 (27.4 overs); Amit Yadav 16 (26); Aryan Bora 4/16 (9.4 overs)	C K Pithawala Ground, Surat; Umpires: Amit Bansal and Ranjeev Sharma; Player of the match: Arpit Bhatewara (Meghalaya)
Scorecard			109 (42.4 overs) (f/o); Subhajit Paul 37* (80); Aryan Bora 3/45 (16 overs)	C K Pithawala Ground, Surat; Umpires: Amit Bansal and Ranjeev Sharma; Player of the match: Arpit Bhatewara (Meghalaya)
Meghalaya won the toss and elected to bat; Points: Meghalaya 7, Arunachal Pradesh 0; Akash Choudhary made fastest ever first class fifty in 11 balls while also became first player to hit 8 sixes in 8 consecutive deliveries

==== Round 5 ====
16–18 November 2025	Arunchal Pradesh	v	Sikkim	Sikkim won by an innings and 319 runs
Scorecard	91 (27.2 overs); Nazeeb Saiyed 28 (54); Lee Yong Lepcha 4/21 (7.2 overs)		514/7d (121.1 overs); Amit Rajera 126 (162); Anurag Yadav 2/85 (24 overs)	SICA ground, Rangpo; Umpires: Mihir Parmar and Premdip Chatterjee; Player of the match: Gurinder Singh (Sikkim)
Scorecard	104 (44.3 overs); Anurag Yadav 27 (20); Ankur Malik 4/28 (12 overs)			SICA ground, Rangpo; Umpires: Mihir Parmar and Premdip Chatterjee; Player of the match: Gurinder Singh (Sikkim)
Arunachal Pradesh won the toss and elected to bat; Points: Sikkim 7, Arunachal Pradesh 0

16–19 November 2025	Mizoram	v	Bihar	Bihar won by 7 wickets
Scorecard	509 (136.5 overs); Armaan Jaffer 193 (271); Khalid Alam 3/80 (22 overs)		522/9 (136.3 overs); Ayush Loharuka 136 (172); Lalrempuia 3/153 (40.3 overs)	Moin-ul-Haq Stadium, Patna; Umpires: Indranil Chakravarti and Sud Abhiroope; Player of the match: Ayush Loharuka (Bihar)
Scorecard	260/6d (57.5 overs); Armaan Jaffer 119* (150); Himanshu Singh 3/67 (12.5 overs)		251/3 (27.4 overs); Mangal Mahrour 67 (54); Codanda Ajit Karthik 2/58 (8 overs)	Moin-ul-Haq Stadium, Patna; Umpires: Indranil Chakravarti and Sud Abhiroope; Player of the match: Ayush Loharuka (Bihar)
Bihar won the toss and elected to field; Points: Bihar 6, Mizoram 0

16–19 November 2025	Meghalaya	v	Manipur	Match drawn
Scorecard	430 (115.4 overs); Rahul Dalal 151 (146); Johnson Singh 2/34 (9 overs)		342 (126.3 overs); Pheiroijam Jotin 86 (177); Chengkam Sangma 2/50 (18 overs)	C K Pithawala Ground, Surat; Umpires: Dharmesh Bhardwaj and M Madhu; Player of the match: Rahul Dalal (Meghalaya)
Scorecard	239/4d (64.3 overs); Rahul Dalal 103* (131); Bishworjit Konthoujam 3/85 (22 overs)		72/1 (25.5 overs); Ronald Longjam 51* (98); Akash Choudhary 1/8 (4 overs)	C K Pithawala Ground, Surat; Umpires: Dharmesh Bhardwaj and M Madhu; Player of the match: Rahul Dalal (Meghalaya)
Meghalaya won the toss and elected to bat; Points: Meghalaya 3, Manipur 1

==== Plate Final ====
22–26 January 2026	Bihar	v	Manipur	Bihar won by 568 runs
Plate Final; Scorecard	522 (135.5 Overs); Bipin Saurabh 143 (189); Rex Rajkumar 4/117 (32 Overs)		264 (89.1 Overs); Ronald Longjam 79 (211); Suraj Kashyap 3/34 (16.1 Overs)	Moin-ul-Haq Stadium, Patna; Umpires: Mohamed Rafi and Anil Dandekar; Player of the match: Sakibul Gani (Bihar)
Plate Final; Scorecard	505/6d (119.3 Overs); Piyush Singh 216* (322); Pheiroijam Jotin 3/85 (24 Overs)		195 (56.1 Overs); Pheiroijam Jotin 74 (102); Suraj Kashyap 3/32 (16 Overs)	Moin-ul-Haq Stadium, Patna; Umpires: Mohamed Rafi and Anil Dandekar; Player of the match: Sakibul Gani (Bihar)
Manipur won the toss and elected to field; Bihar promoted to elite groups for next season.

== Knockout stage ==
Quarter-finals
A1	Jharkhand	235 & 130
C2	Uttarakhand	371
D1	Mumbai	120 & 377
B2	Karnataka	173 & 325/6
B1	Madhya Pradesh	152 & 234
D2	Jammu & Kashmir	194 & 248
C1	Bengal	629
A2	Andhra	295 & 244

Semi-finals
QF1W	Uttarakhand	233 & 260/6
QF4W	Karnataka	736 & 323
QF2W	Jammu & Kashmir	302 & 126/4
QF3W	Bengal	328 & 99

Final
SF1W	Karnataka	293
SF2W	Jammu & Kashmir	584 & 342/4d

=== Quarter-finals ===
6–8 February 2026
1st Quarter-final
Scorecard

Jharkhand	v	Uttarakhand
235 (85 overs); Aditya Singh 83 (167); Janmejay Joshi 4/46 (18 overs)		371 (122.3 overs); Jagadeesha Suchith 70 (172); Aditya Singh 2/57 (17 overs)
130 (41.1 overs); Virat Singh 55 (87); Mayank Mishra 5/22 (13.1 overs)

Uttarakhand won by an innings and 6 runs
Keenan Stadium, Jamshedpur
Umpires: Puttarangaiah Jayapal and Amit Rana
Player of the match: Mayank Mishra (Uttarakhand)

- Uttarakhand won the toss and elected to field.

6–9 February 2026
2nd Quarter-final
Scorecard

Madhya Pradesh	v	Jammu & Kashmir
152 (53.4 overs); Yash Dubey 58 (123); Auqib Nabi 7/40 (18.4 overs)		194 (67 overs); Shubham Khajuria 60 (140); Kuldeep Sen 5/66 (15 overs)
234 (68.3 overs); Saransh Jain 64 (81); Auqib Nabi 5/70 (24 overs)		248 (70.3 overs); Vanshaj Sharma 54 (92); Kuldeep Sen 4/65 (18 overs)

Jammu & Kashmir won by 56 runs
Holkar Stadium, Indore
Umpires: Kaushik Gandhi and Anish Sahasrabudhe
Player of the match: Auqib Nabi (Jammu and Kashmir)

- Madhya Pradesh won the toss and elected to field

6–10 February 2026
3rd Quarter-final
Scorecard

Bengal	v	Andhra
629 (199.1 overs); Sudip Kumar Gharami 299 (596); Shaik Rasheed 4/63 (12.1 overs)		295 (88.4 overs); Ricky Bhui 83(174); Mukesh Kumar 5/66 (22 overs)
		244 (72.2 overs); Nitish Kumar Reddy 90 (144); Shahbaz Ahmed 4/72 (24 overs)

Bengal won by an innings & 90 runs
Bengal Cricket Academy Ground, Kalyani
Umpires: Parashar Joshi and Vinod Seshan
Player of the match: Sudip Kumar Gharami (Bengal)

- Bengal won the toss and elected to field.

6–9 February 2026
4th Quarter-final
Scorecard

Mumbai	v	Karnataka
120 (48.1 overs); Akhil Herwadkar 60 (138); Shreyas Gopal 3/4 (4.1 overs)		173 (47.1 overs); Mayank Agarwal 92 (134); Mohit Avasthi 4/27 (15.1 overs)
377 (98.3 overs); Akash Anand 70 (169); Shikhar Shetty 3/45 (20 overs)		325/6 (73.4 overs); KL Rahul 130 (182); Shardul Thakur 2/55 (10 overs)

Karnataka won by 4 wickets
Sharad Pawar Cricket Academy, Mumbai
Umpires: Yeshwant Barde and Abhijit Bhattacharya
Player of the match: KL Rahul (Karnataka)

- Mumbai won the toss and elected to bat

=== Semi-finals ===
15–19 February 2026
1st Semi-final
Scorecard

Karnataka	v	Uttarakhand
736 (194.4 overs); Devdutt Padikkal 232 (330); Aditya Rawat 4/154 (34.4 overs)		233 (88.5 overs); Lakshya Raichandani 55 (174); Vidyadhar Patil 3/40 (15.5 overs)
323 (74.3 overs); Ravichandran Smaran 127 (149); Mayank Mishra 4/69 (18 overs)		260/6 (62 overs); Avneesh Sudha 66 (71); Shreyas Gopal 3/83 (19)

Match drawn (Karnataka advanced on first-innings lead)
Ekana Cricket Stadium, Lucknow
Umpires: Swaroopanand Kannur and Bhavesh Patel
Player of the match: Devdutt Padikkal (Karnataka)

- Uttarakhand won the toss and elected to field.

15–18 February 2026
2nd Semi-final
Scorecard

Bengal	v	Jammu & Kashmir
328 (97.1 overs); Sudip Kumar Gharami 146 (246); Auqib Nabi 5/87 (26 overs)		302 (51 overs); Abdul Samad 82 (85); Mohammed Shami 8/90 (22.1 overs)
99 (25.1 overs); Shahbaz Ahmed 24 (25); Sunil Kumar 4/27 (9.1 overs)		126/4 (34.4 overs); Vanshaj Sharma 43 (83); Akash Deep 3/46 (15 overs)

Jammu & Kashmir won by 6 wickets
Bengal Cricket Academy Ground, Kalyani
Umpires: Mohit Krishnadas and Saidharshan Kumar
Player of the match: Auqib Nabi (Jammu & Kashmir)

- Jammu and Kashmir won the toss and elected to field.
- This was the first time in Ranji Trophy history that Jammu & Kashmir qualified for the finals.

=== Final ===
24–28 February 2026
Final
Scorecard

Jammu & Kashmir	v	Karnataka
584 (173.1 overs); Shubham Pundir 121 (247); Prasidh Krishna 5/98 (34.1 overs)		293 (93.3 Overs); Mayank Agarwal 160 (266); Auqib Nabi 5/54 (23 overs)
342/4d (113 overs); Qamran Iqbal 160* (311); Prasidh Krishna 2/42 (12 overs)

Match drawn (Jammu & Kashmir won due to first-innings lead)
KSCA Hubli Stadium, Hubballi
Umpires: Ulhas Gandhe and Rohan Pandit
Player of the match: Shubham Pundir (Jammu and Kashmir)

- Jammu & Kashmir won the toss and elected to bat.
- Jammu & Kashmir won their maiden Ranji title.

== Statistics ==
=== Individual statistics ===
==== Most Runs ====
Runs	Batter	Mat	Inns	NO	Average	SR	HS	100s	50s
950	Smaran Ravichandran(Karnataka)	8	13	3	95.00	62.58	227*	4	3
949	Ayush Doseja (Delhi)	7	12	3	105.44	65.22	209	4	5
828	Sanat Sangwan (Delhi)	7	14	2	69.00	46.28	211*	3	3
797	Sudip Kumar Gharami (Bengal)	9	13	0	61.30	53.88	299	3	3
788	Abhinav Tejrana (Goa)	7	12	1	71.63	68.52	205	4	2
Source: ESPNcricinfo | *=not out | Last updated: 28 February 2026

==== Most Wickets ====
Wtks	Bowler	Mat	Inns	Runs	Overs	BBI	Ave	Econ	SR	4WI	5WI
60	Auqib Nabi (Jammu & Kashmir)	10	17	754	284.2	7/24	12.56	2.65	28.43	2	7
59	Mayank Mishra (Uttarakhand)	8	16	1044	376	6/84	17.69	2.77	38.23	5	4
46	Shreyas Gopal (Karnataka)	10	17	983	350.4	8/110	19.10	2.7	42.76	1	2
45	Siddharth Desai (Gujarat)	7	14	829	314.4	5/61	18.42	2.63	41.95	4	2
39	Shahbaz Ahmed_{(Bengal)}	8	15	645	225.4	7/56	16.53	2.85	34.71	2	4
Source: ESPNcricinfo | Last updated: 28 February 2026

==== Most dismissals for a wicket-keeper ====
Dismissals	Player	Mat	Inns	Catches	Stumping	Max dis	Dis/Inn
36	Kanhaiya Wadhawan (Jammu & Kashmir)	9	16	35	1	6 (6ct & 0st)	2.25
33	Kunal Singh Rathore (Rajasthan)	5	10	27	6	7 (7ct & 0st)	3.3
30	Upendra Yadav (Railways)	7	11	23	7	5 (4ct & 1st)	2.727
27	KS Bharaat (Andhra)	8	13	26	1	5 (5ct & 0st)	2.076
27	HS Mantri (Madhya Pradesh)	8	14	23	4	5 (4ct & 1st)	1.928
Source: ESPNcricinfo | Last updated: 18 February 2026

==== Most catches for a player ====
Catches	Player	Mat	Inns	Max dis	Ct/Inn
18	Rajat Paliwal (Services)	7	13	4	1.384
15	Ankit Kumar (Haryana)	7	13	3	1.153
12	SS Kauthankar (Goa)	6	10	3	1.2
11	Vivek Singh (Railways)	6	9	3	1.222
11	Dheeru Singh (Haryana)	7	13	3	0.846
Source: ESPNcricinfo | Last updated: 18 February 2026

==== Highest Individual Score ====
Runs	Batter	Balls	4s	6s	SR	Opposition	Venue	Match date
299	Sudip Kumar Gharami (Bengal)	596	31	6	50.16	Andhra	Bengal Cricket Academy Ground, Kalyani	6 February 2026
248	Deepak Hooda (Rajasthan)	335	22	2	74.02	Mumbai	Sawai Mansingh Stadium, Jaipur	1 November 2025
247	Abhishek Reddy (Andhra)	348	20	2	70.97	Jharkhand	Keenan Stadium, Jamshedpur	16 November 2025
234	Kumar Kushagra (Jharkhand)	367	23	4	63.76	Baroda	Kotambi Stadium, Vadodara	8 November 2025
233	Karun Nair (Karnataka)	389	25	2	59.89	Kerala	KCA Cricket Ground, Mangalapuram, Thiruvananthapuram	1 November 2025
Source: ESPNcricinfo | *=not out | Last updated: 18 February 2026

==== Best bowling figures in an innings ====
Figures	Bowler	Overs	Maidens	Econ	Opposition	Venue	Match date
8/27	Amit Shukla (Services)	20	8	1.35	Haryana	Chaudhry Bansi Lal Cricket Stadium, Lahli	16 November 2025
8/42	Manav Suthar (Rajasthan)	22.3	4	1.86	Chhattisgarh	Madan Paliwal Miraj Sports Centre, Rajsamand	15 October 2025
8/55	Anukul Roy (Jharkhand)	24.5	10	2.21	Nagaland	JSCA International Stadium Complex, Ranchi	1 November 2025
8/90	Md Shami (Bengal)	22.1	3	4.06	Jammu & Kashmir	Bengal Cricket Academy Ground, Kalyani	15 February 2026
8/110	Shreyas Gopal (Karnataka)	39.3	7	2.78	Saurashtra	Niranjan Shah Stadium, Rajkot	15 October 2025
Source: ESPNcricinfo | Last updated: 18 February 2026

==== Best bowling figures in a match ====
Figures	Bowler	Overs	Maidens	Econ	Opposition	Venue	Match date
13/90	Anukul Roy (Jharkhand)	40.3	14	2.22	Nagaland	JSCA International Stadium Complex, Ranchi	1 November 2025
12/110	Auqib Nabi (Jammu and Kashmir)	42.5	4	2.57	Madhya Pradesh	Indore	6 February 2026
11/80	Shahbaz Ahmed (Bengal)	19.1	3	4.17	Haryana	Chaudhry Bansi Lal Cricket Stadium, Lahli	29 January 2026
11/83	Jagadeesha Suchith (Uttarakhand)	44.5	10	1.85	Haryana	Chaudhry Bansi Lal Cricket Stadium, Lahli	8 November 2026
11/86	Amit Shukla (Services)	39.4	8	2.16	Haryana	Chaudhry Bansi Lal Cricket Stadium, Lahli	16 November 2026
Source: ESPNcricinfo | Last updated: 18 February 2026

==== Best bowling averages ====
Average	Bowler	Mat	Wkts	Runs	Balls	BBI	BBM
12.35	PR Bhut (Saurashtra)	5	20	247	581	7/56	-
12.72	Auqib Nabi (Jammu & Kashmir)	9	55	700	1568	7/24	10/53
15.10	SR Kumar (Jammu & Kashmir)	8	29	438	1011	5/29	-
15.69	Nikhil Kashyap (Haryana)	6	26	408	1081	5/53	7/63
16.41	Amit Shukla (Services)	5	29	476	914	8/27	11/86
Source: ESPNcricinfo | Qualification: Minimum 20 wickets | Last updated: 18 February 2026

==== Most fours and sixes ====
Most Fours		Most Sixes	
Fours	Player	Sixes	Player
104	Sudip Kumar Gharami (Bengal)	27	Aman Hakim Khan (Puducherry)
100	Ayush Doseja (Delhi)	16	Kartik Sharma (Rajasthan)
98	Siddhesh Lad (Mumbai)	16	Abhinav Tejrana (Goa)
85	AA Loharuka (Bihar)	16	Abdul Samad (Jammu & Kashmir)
81	Ravichandran Smaran (Karnataka)	15	Robin Minz (Jharkhand)
Source: ESPNcricinfo | Last updated: 18 February 2026

=== Team statistics ===
==== Highest team totals ====
Score	Team	Overs	RR	Inns	Opposition	Venue	Date
771	Jammu and Kashmir	182.1	4.23	2	Himachal Pradesh	Nadaun	29 January 2026
736	Karnataka	194.4	3.78	1	Uttarakhand	Ekana Stadium, Lucknow	15 February 2026
631	Hyderabad	154	4.09	2	Chhattisgarh	Hyderabad	29 January 2026
630/5d	Mumbai	147	4.28	1	Puducherry	Wankhede Stadium, Mumbai	16 November 2025
629	Bengal	199.1	3.15	2	Andhra	Bengal Cricket Academy Ground, Kalyani	6 February 2026
Source: ESPNcricinfo | d=Declared | Last updated: 18 February 2026

==== Lowest team totals ====
Score	Team	Overs	RR	Inns	Opposition	Venue	Date
47	Tripura	19.1	2.45	3	Haryana	Chaudhry Bansi Lal Cricket Stadium, Lahli	25 October 2025
73	Arunachal Pradesh	27.4	2.63	2	Meghalaya	C K Pithawala Ground, Surat	8 November 2025
75	Assam	29.3	2.54	3	Services	Tinsukia District Sports Association Ground, Tinsukia	25 October 2025
84	Uttar Pradesh	27.4	3.03	3	Jharkhand	Ekana Stadium, Lucknow	22 January 2026
88	Uttarakhand	38	2.31	3	Services	Airforce Complex ground, Palam, New Delhi	1 November 2025
Source: ESPNcricinfo | Last updated: 18 February 2026

=== Partnership statistics ===
==== Highest partnership by wicket ====
Wkt	Runs	Batters		Team	Opposition	Venue	Match date
1st	321*	Sanat Sangwan	Arpit Rana	Delhi	Pondicherry	Arun Jaitley Stadium, New Delhi	01 November 2025
2nd	307	Vimal Khumar	Pradosh Ranjan Paul	Tamil Nadu	Nagaland	BCCI COE Ground 3, Bengaluru	25 October 2025
3rd	289	Kishan Lyngdoh	Arpit Bhatewara	Meghalaya	Arunachal Pradesh	C K Pithawala Ground, Surat	08 November 2025
4th	343	Ravichandran Smaran	Karun Nair	Karnataka	Kerala	KCA Cricket Ground, Mangalapuram, Thiruvananthapuram	01 November 2025
5th	263	Kartik Sharma	Deepak Hooda	Rajasthan	Mumbai	Sawai Mansingh Stadium, Jaipur	01 November 2025
6th	230	Dega Nischal	Imliwati Lemtur	Nagaland	Tamil Nadu	BCCI COE Ground 3, Bengaluru	25 October 2025
7th	225	Mahipal Lomror	Kartik Sharma	Rajasthan	Delhi	Madan Paliwal Miraj Sports Centre, Rajsamand	16 November 2025
8th	140	Nagaho Chishi	CD Bist	Nagaland	Andhra	Sovima	29 January 2026
9th	193*	Dev Aditya Singh	AN Khare	Chhattisgarh	Hyderabad	Hyderabad	29 January 2026
10th	97	MS Grewal	Ayush Doseja	Delhi	Chhattisgarh	CoE 2, Bengaluru	22 January 2026
Source: ESPNcricinfo | *=not out | Last updated: 18 February 2026

==== Highest partnership by runs ====
Runs	Batters		Wkt	Team	Opposition	Venue	Match date
343	Ravichandran Smaran	Karun Nair	4th	Karnataka	Kerala	KCA Cricket Ground, Mangalapuram, Thiruvananthapuram	1 November 2025
321*	Sanat Sangwan	Arpit Rana	1st	Delhi	Pondicherry	Arun Jaitley Stadium, New Delhi	1 November 2025
319	Sanat Sangwan	Ayush Doseja	4th	Delhi	Hyderabad	NexGen Cricket Ground, Hyderabad	15 October 2025
309	Lalit Yadav	Abhinav Tejrana	4th	Goa	Chandigarh	Goa Cricket Association Academy, Porvorim	15 October 2025
307	Vimal Khumar	Pradosh Ranjan Paul	2nd	Tamil Nadu	Nagaland	BCCI COE Ground 3, Bengaluru	25 October 2025
Source: ESPNcricinfo | Last updated: 18 February 2026
