= 2022–23 Duleep Trophy =

Cricket tournament

- Dates: 8 September – 25 September 2022
- Administrator: BCCI
- Cricket format: First-class cricket
- Tournament format: Knockout
- Champions: West Zone (19th title)
- Runners-up: South Zone
- Participants: 6
- Matches: 5
- Player of the series: Jaydev Unadkat (West Zone)
- Most runs: Yashasvi Jaiswal (West Zone) (497)
- Most wickets: Ravisrinivasan Sai Kishore (South Zone) (17)

The 2022–23 Duleep Trophy, also known as Mastercard Duleep trophy due to sponsorship reasons, was the 59th season of the Duleep Trophy, a first-class cricket tournament in India. It started from 8 September 2022. The zonal format of the tournament returned after the 2014–15 season. The tournament was played across Tamil Nadu and Puducherry. In the final, West Zone defeated South Zone by 294 runs to win their 19th title.

== Squads ==
Central Zone	East Zone	North Zone	North East Zone	South Zone	West Zone
Karan Sharma (c); Shubham Sharma (vc); Aniket Choudhary; Deepak Dhapola; Yash Dubey; Priyam Garg; Venkatesh Iyer; Kumar Kartikeya; Ashok Menaria; Ankit Rajpoot; Aditya Sarwate; Rinku Singh; Akshay Wadkar; Gaurav Yadav	Manoj Tiwary (c); Virat Singh (vc); Shahbaz Ahmed; Akash Deep; Sudip Kumar Gharami; Mukhtar Hussain; Kumar Kushagra; Anustup Majumdar; Shantanu Mishra; Manisankar Murasingh; Shahbaz Nadeem; Riyan Parag; Abhishek Porel; Ishan Porel; Nazim Siddiqui	Mandeep Singh (c); Yash Dhull (vc); Mayank Dagar; Qamran Iqbal; Siddharth Kaul; Anmol Malhotra; Vikas Mishra; Pulkit Narang; Himanshu Rana; Navdeep Saini; Nishant Sindhu; Jagjit Singh; Dhruv Shorey; Akash Vasisht; Manan Vohra	Ashish Thapa (c); Techi Doria; Rongsen Jonathan; Khrievitso Kense; Bishworjit Konthoujam; G Lalbiakvela; Kishan Lyngdoh; Ankur Malik; Al Bashid Muhammed; Techi Neri; Rex Rajkumar; Dippu Sangma; Kishan Singha; Bobby Zahiruddin; Hokaito Zhimomi	Hanuma Vihari (c); Mayank Agarwal (vc); Ricky Bhui; Lakshay Garg; Krishnappa Gowtham; Baba Indrajith; Eknath Kerkar; R. Sai Kishore; Rohan Kunnummal; Devdutt Padikkal; Manish Pandey; CV Stephen; Ravi Teja; Basil Thampi; Tanay Thyagarajan	Ajinkya Rahane (c); Satyajeet Bachhav; Chintan Gaja; Shreyas Iyer; Armaan Jaffer; Yashasvi Jaiswal; Chirag Jani; Sarfaraz Khan; Shams Mulani; Priyank Panchal; Het Patel; Chetan Sakariya; Prithvi Shaw; Atit Sheth; Hardik Tamore; ~~Shardul Thakur~~; Rahul Tripathi; Jaydev Unadkat

== Fixtures ==
Quarter-finals
North East Zone	235
West Zone	590/2d & 268/5
East Zone	397 & 102/3
North Zone	545

Semi-finals
Central Zone	128 & 221
West Zone	257 & 371
South Zone	630/8d & 316/4d
North Zone	207 & 94

Final
South Zone	327 & 234
West Zone	270 & 585/4d

=== Quarter-finals ===
8–11 September 2022
Scorecard

West Zone	v	North East Zone
590/2d (123 overs); Yashasvi Jaiswal 228 (321); Rongsen Jonathan 1/68 (14 overs)		235 (81.5 overs); Ashish Thapa 43 (103); Chintan Gaja 4/38 (15.5 overs)
268/5 (64.3 overs); Atit Sheth 102* (101); Dippu Sangma 3/70 (20 overs)

Match drawn
M. A. Chidambaram Stadium, Chennai
Umpires: Vinod Seshan and Virender Sharma
Player of the match: Yashasvi Jaiswal (West Zone)

- North East Zone won the toss and elected to field.

8–11 September 2022
Scorecard

East Zone	v	North Zone
397 (136.4 overs); Virat Singh 117 (247); Nishant Sindhu 3/64 (20.4 overs)		545 (148.5 overs); Yash Dhull 193 (243); Shahbaz Ahmed 5/86 (19.4 overs)
102/3 (21 overs); Abhishek Porel 50* (55); Pulkit Narang 1/21 (7 overs)

Match drawn
Cricket Association Ground, Puducherry
Umpires: Chirra Ravikanthreddy and Akshay Totre
Player of the match: Yash Dhull (North Zone)

- North Zone won the toss and elected to field.

=== Semi-finals ===
15–18 September 2022
Scorecard

West Zone	v	Central Zone
257 (85.4 overs); Rahul Tripathi 67 (151); Kumar Kartikeya 5/66 (27 overs)		128 (40.1 overs); Karan Sharma 34 (64); Tanush Kotian 3/17 (6.1 overs)
371 (104.4 overs); Prithvi Shaw 142 (140); Kumar Kartikeya 3/105 (36.4 overs)		221 (57.1 overs); Rinku Singh 65 (71); Shams Mulani 5/72 (18.1 overs)

West Zone won by 279 runs
SNR College Cricket Ground, Coimbatore
Umpires: Sadashiv Iyer and Nitin Pandit
Player of the match: Prithvi Shaw (West Zone)

- Central Zone won the toss and elected to field.

15–18 September 2022
Scorecard

South Zone	v	North Zone
630/8d (172.5 overs); Rohan Kunnummal 143 (225); Mayank Dagar 3/184 (56.4 overs)		207 (67 overs); Nishant Sindhu 40 (64); Ravisrinivasan Sai Kishore 7/70 (25 overs)
316/4d (65 overs); Ravi Teja 104* (120); Pulkit Narang 2/102 (22 overs)		94 (30.4 overs); Yash Dhull 59 (58); Tanay Thyagarajan 3/12 (7 overs)

South Zone won by 645 runs
Salem Cricket Foundation Stadium, Salem
Umpires: Yeshwant Barde and Ulhas Gandhe
Player of the match: Ravisrinivasan Sai Kishore (South Zone)

- South Zone won the toss and elected to bat.

=== Final ===
21–25 September 2022
Scorecard

West Zone	v	South Zone
270 (96.3 overs); Het Patel 98 (189); Ravisrinivasan Sai Kishore 5/86 (35.3 overs)		327 (83.1 overs); Baba Indrajith 118 (125); Jaydev Unadkat 4/52 (19 overs)
585/4d (128 overs); Yashasvi Jaiswal 265 (323); Ravisrinivasan Sai Kishore 2/157 (39 overs)		234 (71.2 overs); Rohan Kunnummal 93 (100); Shams Mulani 4/51 (18 overs)

West Zone won by 294 runs
SNR College Cricket Ground, Coimbatore
Umpires: Nikhil Patwardhan and Navdeep Singh
Player of the match: Yashasvi Jaiswal (West Zone)

- West Zone won the toss and elected to bat.
