= Kshitij Patel =

Indian cricketer (born 1997)

Personal information
- Full name: Kshitij Dhimantbhai Patel
- Born: 15 October 1997 (age 29); Sabarkantha, Gujarat, India
- Batting: Right-handed
- Bowling: Right arm off break
- Role: Middle order Batter

Domestic team information
- Years: Team
- 2017/18–present: Gujarat

Career statistics
Competition	FC	LA	T20
Matches	9	15	7
Runs scored	339	339	115
Batting average	22.60	33.90	23.00
100s/50s	0/2	0/2	0/0
Top score	95	89*	44*
Catches/stumpings	2/–	8/–	3/–
- Source: ESPNcricinfo, 7 January 2025

Kshitij Patel (born 15 October 1997) is an Indian cricketer. He made his Twenty20 debut for Gujarat in the 2017–18 Zonal T20 League on 7 January 2018. He made his first-class debut on 19 January 2020, for Gujarat in the 2019–20 Ranji Trophy.
