= Mayank Mishra =

Indian cricketer (born 1990)

Personal information
- Born: 9 October 1990 (age 36); Rudrapur, Uttarakhand, India
- Batting: Left-handed
- Bowling: Slow left arm orthodox
- Role: All-rounder
- Source: ESPNcricinfo, 20 September 2018

Mayank Mishra (born 9 October 1990) is an Indian cricketer. He made his List A debut for Uttarakhand in the 2018–19 Vijay Hazare Trophy on 20 September 2018. He made his first-class debut for Uttarakhand in the 2018–19 Ranji Trophy on 12 November 2018. He made his Twenty20 debut for Uttarakhand in the 2018–19 Syed Mushtaq Ali Trophy on 28 February 2019.
