= Madan Paliwal Miraj Sports Centre =

Cricket stadium in India

Madan Paliwal Miraj Sports Center
- Interactive map of Madan Paliwal Miraj Sports Center
- Location: Nathdwara, Rajasthan, India
- Coordinates: 24.8915509°N 73.7917133°E
- Capacity: 34,000
- Owner: Miraj Group
- Operator: Sportosphere Services Pvt. Ltd.
- Website: www.mpmsc.in

Madan Paliwal Miraj Sports Centre
- Hotel chain: Radisson Blu

General information
- Location: N.H. 58, Rabcha, Nathdwara, Rajsamand, Rajasthan 313301

Other information
- Number of rooms: 234

The Madan Paliwal Miraj Sports Centre (MPMSC), known commercially as the Radisson Blu Miraj Stadium, is an international Cricket Stadium located in Nathdwara, Rajasthan, India. Developed by Mr. Madan Paliwal, Chairman and Managing Director of the Miraj Group. the stadium is designed to accommodate up to 34,000 spectators.

== Events ==
Event	Year	Organizer	Date
Asian Legends League, 2025	2025	EMCL Sports	10-18 March 2025
PIMS Mewar Cup	2025	-	16-23 February 2025

== See also ==
- List of cricket grounds by capacity
