= Kranthi Kumar (cricketer) =

Indian cricketer (born 1996)

Personal information
- Born: 25 March 1996 (age 30)
- Source: ESPNcricinfo, 12 October 2019

Kranthi Kumar (born 25 March 1996) is an Indian cricketer. He made his List A debut on 12 October 2019, for Andhra in the 2019–20 Vijay Hazare Trophy. He made his Twenty20 debut on 11 November 2019, for Andhra in the 2019–20 Syed Mushtaq Ali Trophy.
