= Nedumankuzhy Basil =

Indian cricketer

Personal information
- Full name: Nedumankuzhy Poulose Basil
- Born: 20 October 1996 (age 30); Perumbavoor, Kerala, India
- Batting: Right-handed
- Bowling: Right-arm fast-medium
- Role: Bowler

Domestic team information
- Years: Team
- 2019-present: Kerala

Career statistics
Competition	FC	LA	T20
Matches	12	18	4
Runs scored	42	38	7
Batting average	8.40	38.00	–
100s/50s	0/0	0/0	0/0
Top score	16*	15*	7*
Balls bowled	1,959	751	71
Wickets	28	16	5
Bowling average	32.03	43.18	17.60
5 wickets in innings	0	0	0
10 wickets in match	0	0	0
Best bowling	4/117	4/17	3/16
Catches/stumpings	6/0	3/0	0/–
- Source: ESPNcricinfo, 8 April 2025

Nedumankuzhy Paulose Basil (born 20 October 1996), commonly known as NP Basil, is an Indian cricketer who plays for Kerala in domestic cricket. He is a right-handed medium-pacer.

== Domestic career ==
Basil was born on 20 October 1996 in Perumbavoor in Ernakulam district of Kerala. He started his cricketing career at Perumbavoor Cricket Club and later moved to Ernakulam District Academy. He has represented Kerala in all age-group levels.

He made his first-class debut for Kerala on 27 January 2020 in the 2019–20 Ranji Trophy. He played two matches in the tournament and took four wickets with a best bowling figure of 3/54 against Vidarbha. He made his List A debut on 20 February 2021 for Kerala in the 2020–21 Vijay Hazare Trophy. His best-bowling figure (3 for 57 in eight overs) from the tournament came against Karnataka in a losing cause. He played 5 matches in the tournament and took 5 wickets.

He played for KCA Eagles in the 2020–21 season of KCA President's Cup T20.
