= Nakul Sharma =

Indian cricketer (born 1993)

Personal information
- Full name: Nakul Sharma
- Born: 23 October 1993 (age 33); Bilaspur, Himachal Pradesh
- Batting: Right-handed
- Bowling: Legbreak googly
- Role: Wicketkeeper

Domestic team information
- Years: Team
- 2017–18: Services
- Source: ESPNcricinfo, 5 February 2018

Nakul Sharma (born 23 October 1993) is an Indian cricketer. He made his List A debut for Services in the 2017–18 Vijay Hazare Trophy on 5 February 2018.
