= Rahul Singh (cricketer, born 1992) =

Indian cricketer (born 1992)

Personal information
- Full name: Rahul Khajan Singh
- Born: 12 September 1992 (age 34); Kaithal, Haryana, India
- Batting: Left-handed
- Bowling: Slow left-arm

Domestic team information
- Years: Team
- 2011-17: Himachal Pradesh
- 2017-2023: Services
- 2025: Chandigarh
- 2026-present: Services
- Source: Cricinfo, 19 August 2026

Rahul Singh (born 12 September 1992) is an Indian first-class cricketer who currently plays for Services. He started his career with Himachal Pradesh, making his List A debut against Delhi in Chandigarh in 2010–11. Two seasons later, he made his first-class debut for Himachal, against Andhra in Nadaun in the 2012-13 Ranji Trophy. In the same season, he also made his T20 debut, against Services in Rohtak in the Syed Mushtaq Ali Trophy.

In 2017–18, Rahul moved to Services. He played for them till the 2022–23 season. In 2025–26, he represented Chandigarh in the Syed Mushtaq Ali Trophy but after just one season with them, he moved back to Services.

In 2019, he was with Rajasthan Royals as a net bowler for the IPL.

== Youth career ==
Rahul started his Under-19 cricket with Himachal Pradesh. In the 2014–15, he was the highest wicket-taker in the Under-23 CK Nayudu Trophy. In seven matches, he took 33 wickets at an average of 22.84.
