= Shivalik Sharma =

Indian cricketer (born 1998)

Personal information
- Full name: Shivalik Sunil Sharma
- Born: 28 November 1998 (age 27); Vadodara, Gujarat, India
- Batting: Left-handed
- Bowling: Left arm googly
- Source: Cricinfo, 6 December 2018

Shivalik Sharma (born 28 November 1998) is an Indian cricketer. He made his first-class debut for Baroda in the 2018–19 Ranji Trophy on 6 December 2018.
