= Arjun Sharma =

Indian cricketer (born 1996)

Personal information
- Full name: Arjun Pawan Sharma
- Born: 21 May 1996 (age 30); Jalandhar, Punjab, India
- Source: ESPNcricinfo, 19 September 2018

Arjun Sharma (born 21 May 1996) is an Indian cricketer. He made his List A debut for Services in the 2018–19 Vijay Hazare Trophy on 19 September 2018. He made his Twenty20 debut for Services in the 2018–19 Syed Mushtaq Ali Trophy on 21 February 2019. He made his first-class debut on 25 December 2019, for Services in the 2019–20 Ranji Trophy.
