= Techi Neri =

Indian cricketer (born 1994)

Personal information
- Born: 10 May 1994 (age 32)
- Batting: Right handed
- Bowling: Right arm offbreak

Domestic team information
- Years: Team
- 2018–present: Arunachal Pradesh
- Source: Cricinfo, 19 September 2018

Techi Neri (born 10 May 1994) is an Indian cricketer who represents Arunachal Pradesh in domestic cricket. He made his List A debut for Arunachal Pradesh in the 2018–19 Vijay Hazare Trophy on 19 September 2018. He made his first-class debut for Arunachal Pradesh in the 2018–19 Ranji Trophy on 28 November 2018. In August 2022, he was named in the North East Zone's team for the 2022-23 Duleep Trophy.
