= Swastik Samal =

Indian cricketer (born 2000)

Personal information
- Full name: Swastik Piyush Prakash Samal
- Born: 27 July 2000 (age 26); Koraput, Odisha, India

Domestic team information
- Years: Team
- 2024: Odisha cricket team
- 2025: Odisha Pro T20 League

Career statistics
Competition	FC	LA	T20
Matches	12	11	13
Runs scored	686	521	362
Batting average	34.30	52.10	27.84
100s/50s	2/3	1/3	1/2
Top score	169	212	105
Balls bowled	186	30	0
Wickets	0	1	0
Bowling average	–	22.00	–
5 wickets in innings	0	0	0
10 wickets in match	0	–	–
Best bowling	–	1/19	–
Catches/stumpings	9/–	3/–	4/–
- Source: Cricinfo, 25 December 2025

Swastik Samal (born 27 July 2000) is an Indian cricketer. He made his Twenty20 debut for Odisha in the 2018–19 Syed Mushtaq Ali Trophy on 24 February 2019. He made his List A debut on 4 October 2019, for Odisha in the 2019–20 Vijay Hazare Trophy.
