= Suraj Ahuja =

Indian cricketer (born 1999)

Personal information
- Full name: Suraj Ajya Ahuja
- Born: 23 September 1999 (age 26); Sri Ganganagar, Rajasthan, India

Domestic team information
- Years: Team
- 2021: Rajasthan
- 2022-present: Railways
- Source: Cricinfo, 4 November 2021

Suraj Ahuja (born 23 September 1999) is an Indian cricketer, who was a former captain of the India national under-19 cricket team. He made his Twenty20 debut on 4 November 2021, for Rajasthan in the 2021–22 Syed Mushtaq Ali Trophy.

== See also ==
- List of India national cricket captains
