= Sudip Kumar Gharami =

Indian cricketer (born 1999)

Personal information
- Full name: Sudip Kumar Gharami
- Born: 21 March 1999 (age 27); North 24 Parganas, West Bengal, India
- Batting: Right-handed
- Bowling: Right-arm off-break

Domestic team information
- Years: Team
- 2020–present: Bengal

Career statistics
Competition	FC	LA	T20
Matches	39	28	29
Runs scored	2,511	1,210	570
Batting average	42.56	52.60	28.50
100s/50s	8/10	4/5	0/3
Top score	299	162	68
Catches/stumpings	31/–	21/–	11/–
- Source: Cricinfo, 16 February 2026

Sudip Kumar Gharami (Bengali: সুদীপ কুমার ঘরামি; born 21 March 1999) is an Indian cricketer. He made his first-class debut on 9 March 2020, for Bengal in the final of the 2019–20 Ranji Trophy.

== Early life ==
Sudip Kumar Gharami was born on 21 March 1999 in North 24 Parganas, West Bengal.

== Domestic career ==
Gharami made his first-class debut for Bengal in the final of the 2019–20 Ranji Trophy on 9 March 2020. He later made his List A and Twenty20 debuts for Bengal in domestic competitions and established himself as a regular top-order batter across formats.

He has played several notable innings for Bengal in the Ranji Trophy and other domestic tournaments, and has also captained the side on multiple occasions in limited-overs competitions. During the 2025–26 Ranji Trophy, he attracted significant attention after scoring 299 in the quarter-final against Andhra, helping Bengal advance to the semi-finals, where he followed it with a 146 against Jammu and Kashmir.
