= Lalrempuia =

Indian cricketer (born 1993)

Personal information
- Born: 15 January 1993 (age 33)
- Batting: Right handed
- Bowling: Right arm offbreak

Domestic team information
- Years: Team
- 2018–19: Mizoram
- Source: ESPNcricinfo, 3 October 2019

Lalrempuia (born 15 January 1993) is an Indian cricketer. He made his List A debut on 19 September 2018, for Mizoram in the 2018–19 Vijay Hazare Trophy. He made his first-class debut on 20 December 2018, for Mizoram in the 2018–19 Ranji Trophy. He made his Twenty20 debut on 24 February 2019, also for Mizoram, in the 2018–19 Syed Mushtaq Ali Trophy.
