= Abhishek Reddy =

Indian cricketer (born 1994)

Personal information
- Full name: Abhishek Manik Reddy
- Born: 14 September 1994 (age 31); Bidar, Karnataka, India
- Batting: Right-handed
- Bowling: Right-arm offbreak

Domestic team information
- Years: Team
- 2015–2020: Karnataka
- 2022: Andhra
- Source: ESPNcricinfo, 31 October 2022

Abhishek Reddy (born 14 September 1994) is an Indian first-class cricketer who plays for Andhra.
