= Anustup Majumdar =

Indian cricketer (born 1984)

Personal information
- Full name: Anustup Prabir Majumdar
- Born: 30 April 1984 (age 42); Chandannagore, West Bengal, India
- Batting: Right-handed
- Bowling: Right-arm leg break Googly
- Role: Batsman

Domestic team information
- Years: Team
- 2004/05–present: Bengal
- 2012: Pune Warriors India

Career statistics
Competition	FC	List A	T20
Matches	102	102	37
Runs scored	5,936	3,211	526
Batting average	41.80	42.81	20.23
100s/50s	18/25	7/15	0/0
Top score	159	111*	48*
Balls bowled	1,167	144	6
Wickets	21	3	1
Bowling average	40.66	67.33	14.00
5 wickets in innings	0	0	0
10 wickets in match	0	0	0
Best bowling	4/29	2/38	1/14
Catches/stumpings	79/-	47/–	13/–
- Source: ESPNcricinfo, 11 February 2026

Anustup Majumdar (Bengali: অনুষ্টুপ মজুমদার. Born 30 April 1984) is an Indian first-class cricketer who plays for Bengal.

He was born in Chinsurah and spent his early life there before moving onto Liluah. He plays for the Mohun Bagan cricket team in the CAB division. He is a right-hand batsman and leg-break bowler. He was a part of Pune Warriors squad in the Indian Premier League. Majumdar has played for India A cricket team in 2012. He was instrumental in the Bengal squad of 2019–2020 ranji trophy, where he scored a crucial 149 in the semi-finals against Karnataka in Eden gardens to reach 311 1st innings total and eventually went on to play the finals against Saurashtra. This knock is remembered as one of the best in Bengal's Ranji Trophy history.

He was the leading run-scorer for Bengal in the 2017–18 Ranji Trophy, with 560 runs in six matches.
