= Tanay Thyagarajan =

Indian cricketer (born 1995)

Personal information
- Born: 15 November 1995 (age 30); Bangalore, Karnataka, India
- Batting: Left-handed
- Bowling: Left-arm orthodox spin

Domestic team information
- Years: Team
- 2017–present: Hyderabad

Career statistics
| Competition | FC | LA | T20 |
|---|---|---|---|
| Matches | 17 | 24 | 27 |
| Runs scored | 450 | 177 | 164 |
| Batting average | 19.56 | 16.09 | 14.90 |
| 100s/50s | 0/3 | 0/0 | 0/0 |
| Top score | 69 | 28 | 25 |
| Balls bowled | 2,785 | 1,311 | 594 |
| Wickets | 53 | 21 | 16 |
| Bowling average | 30.90 | 48.95 | 37.81 |
| 5 wickets in innings | 3 | 0 | 0 |
| 10 wickets in match | 0 | – | – |
| Best bowling | 5/43 | 3/33 | 2/13 |
| Catches/stumpings | 14/– | 13/– | 15/– |
- Source: Cricinfo, 20 January 2024

Tanay Thyagarajan (born 15 November 1995) is an Indian cricketer. He plays for Hyderabad in domestic cricket and is known mainly for his left-arm spin bowling.

Tanay made his List A debut for Hyderabad in the 2017–18 Vijay Hazare Trophy on 21 February 2018. He made his first-class debut for Hyderabad in the 2018–19 Ranji Trophy on 20 November 2018. He was the leading wicket-taker for Hyderabad in the tournament, with 17 dismissals in five matches.
