= Kumar Kartikeya =

Indian cricketer (born 1997)

Kumar Kartikeya Singh
Personal information
- Full name: Kumar Kartikeya Singh
- Born: 26 December 1997 (age 28); Kuwasi, Uttar Pradesh, India
- Batting: Right-handed
- Bowling: Slow Left arm Orthodox, Left arm Wrist spin
- Role: Bowler

Domestic team information
- Years: Team
- 2018–present: Madhya Pradesh
- 2022–2024: Mumbai Indians
- 2025: Rajasthan Royals

Career statistics
Competition	FC	LA	T20
Matches	38	36	42
Runs scored	565	107	26
Batting average	11.77	8.23	4.33
100s/50s	0/1	0/0	0/0
Top score	61	21	6
Balls bowled	9,151	1,813	864
Wickets	168	46	49
Bowling average	21.92	26.19	21.16
5 wickets in innings	9	0	0
10 wickets in match	2	0	0
Best bowling	6/20	4/34	3/10
Catches/stumpings	13/–	9/–	4/–
- Source: ESPNcricinfo, 31 March 2025

Kumar Kartikeya Singh (born 26 December 1997) is an Indian cricketer who represents Madhya Pradesh in domestic cricket and previously appeared for the Mumbai Indians in the Indian Premier League (IPL).

He made his List A debut for Madhya Pradesh in the 2018–19 Vijay Hazare Trophy on 26 September 2018. Subsequently, he made his first-class debut for Madhya Pradesh in the 2018–19 Ranji Trophy on 28 November 2018. Kartikeya also made his Twenty20 debut for Madhya Pradesh in the 2018–19 Syed Mushtaq Ali Trophy on 2 March 2019.

In April 2022, Kartikeya was named as the replacement for Arshad Khan in the Mumbai Indians squad for the 2022 Indian Premier League (IPL), after Khan was ruled out due to an injury.
