= Armaan Jaffer =

Indian cricketer (born 1998)

Personal information
- Born: 25 October 1998 (age 28); Sangli, Maharashtra, India
- Batting: Right-handed
- Bowling: Right-arm offbreak
- Role: Batsman
- Relatives: Wasim Jaffer (uncle)

Domestic team information
- Years: Team
- 2016/17–2022/23: Mumbai
- Source: ESPNcricinfo, 11 April 2016

Armaan Jaffer (born 25 October 1998) is an Indian cricketer who played for Mumbai in domestic competitions. He rose to fame after scoring a then-record 498 for Rizvi Springfield School against IES Raja Shivaji School in the 2010 Giles Shield tournament at Cross Maidan. Jaffer is the nephew of former cricketer Wasim Jaffer.

Armaan was once again in news when he slammed three consecutive double hundreds. With this he scored 895 runs in 5 matches scored at an average of 223.75 in Cooch Behar Trophy.

In December 2015, he was named in 15 man squad for 2016 Under-19 Cricket World Cup in Bangladesh

In February 2016, he was added to Kings XI Punjab squad for INR 10 lakh. He made his first-class debut for Mumbai in the 2016–17 Ranji Trophy on 6 October 2016. He made his Twenty20 debut for Mumbai in the 2016–17 Inter State Twenty-20 Tournament on 2 February 2017. In November 2019, he was named in India's squad for the 2019 ACC Emerging Teams Asia Cup in Bangladesh. He made his List A debut for India, against Nepal, in the Emerging Teams Cup on 14 November 2019.
