= Qamran Iqbal =

Indian cricketer (born 2001)

Personal information
- Full name: Qamran Iqbal Lone
- Born: 17 October 2001 (age 25); Srinagar, Jammu and Kashmir, India
- Batting: Right-handed
- Bowling: Right-arm leg-spin
- Role: Opening batsman

Domestic team information
- Years: Team
- 2018/19–present: Jammu and Kashmir

Career statistics
Competition	FC	LA	T20
Matches	l5	20	25
Runs scored	913	663	617
Batting average	36.52	36.83	25.70
100s/50s	2/6	1/6	0/3
Top score	160*	116	64
Catches/stumpings	4/–	3/–	6/–
- Source: Qamran Iqbal https://www.cricinfo.com/cricketers/qamran-iqbal-1169609, 12 August 2026

Qamran Iqbal (born 17 October 2001) is an Indian cricketer. He made his first-class debut for Jammu & Kashmir in the 2018–19 Ranji Trophy on 22 December 2018. He played for the India U19 cricket team in 2018 and 2019.

He made his List A debut on 24 September 2019, for Jammu and Kashmir in the 2019–20 Vijay Hazare Trophy. He made his Twenty20 debut on 10 January 2021, for Jammu and Kashmir in the 2020–21 Syed Mushtaq Ali Trophy.
