= Pulkit Narang =

Indian cricketer (born 1994)

Personal information
- Born: 18 June 1994 (age 32); Delhi, India
- Batting: Right handed
- Bowling: Right arm Offbreak

Domestic team information
- Years: Team
- 2015–?: Delhi
- ?–present: Services

Career statistics
Competition	FC	LA	T20
Matches	40	32	25
Runs scored	1,002	465	68
Batting average	17.57	35.76	17.00
100s/50s	0/2	0/3	0/0
Top score	55	67*	25*
Balls bowled	7,038	1,788	465
Wickets	119	35	33
Bowling average	29.05	37.97	15.78
5 wickets in innings	6	0	0
10 wickets in match	1	0	0
Best bowling	6/56	4/42	4/7
Catches/stumpings	16/–	15/–	7/–
- Source: Cricinfo, 27 March 2025

Pulkit Narang (born 18 June 1994) is an Indian cricketer who played for Delhi.

He made his first-class debut on 30 October in the 2015–16 Ranji Trophy. He made his List A debut on 25 September 2019, for Services in the 2019–20 Vijay Hazare Trophy. He made his Twenty20 debut on 9 November 2019, for Services in the 2019–20 Syed Mushtaq Ali Trophy.
