= Historic roads and trails =

Historical trail or road

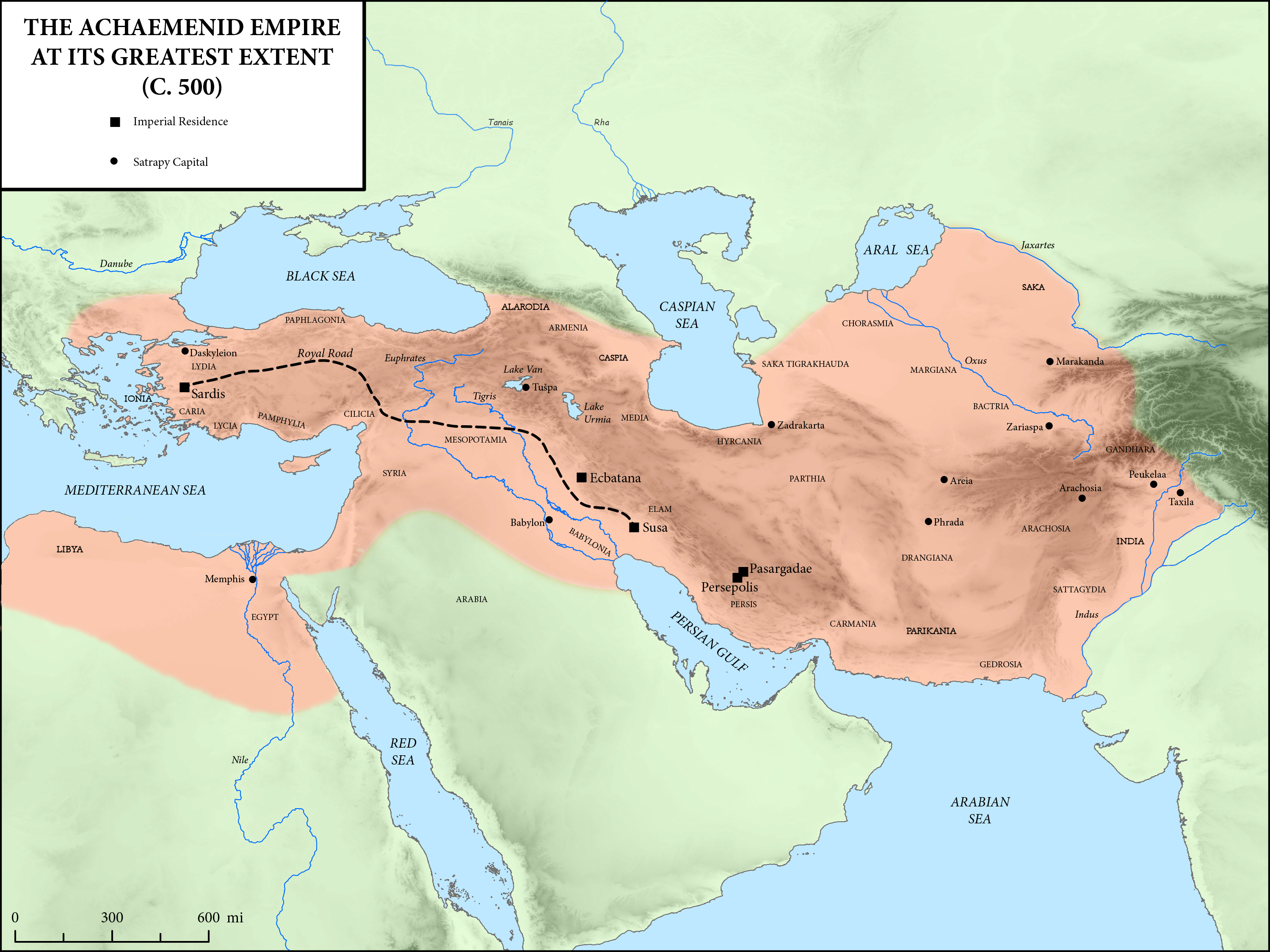
The map of Achaemenid Empire and the section of the Royal Road, of the Persian Empire, noted by the ancient Greek historian Herodotus (c. 484 BC – c. 425 BC)

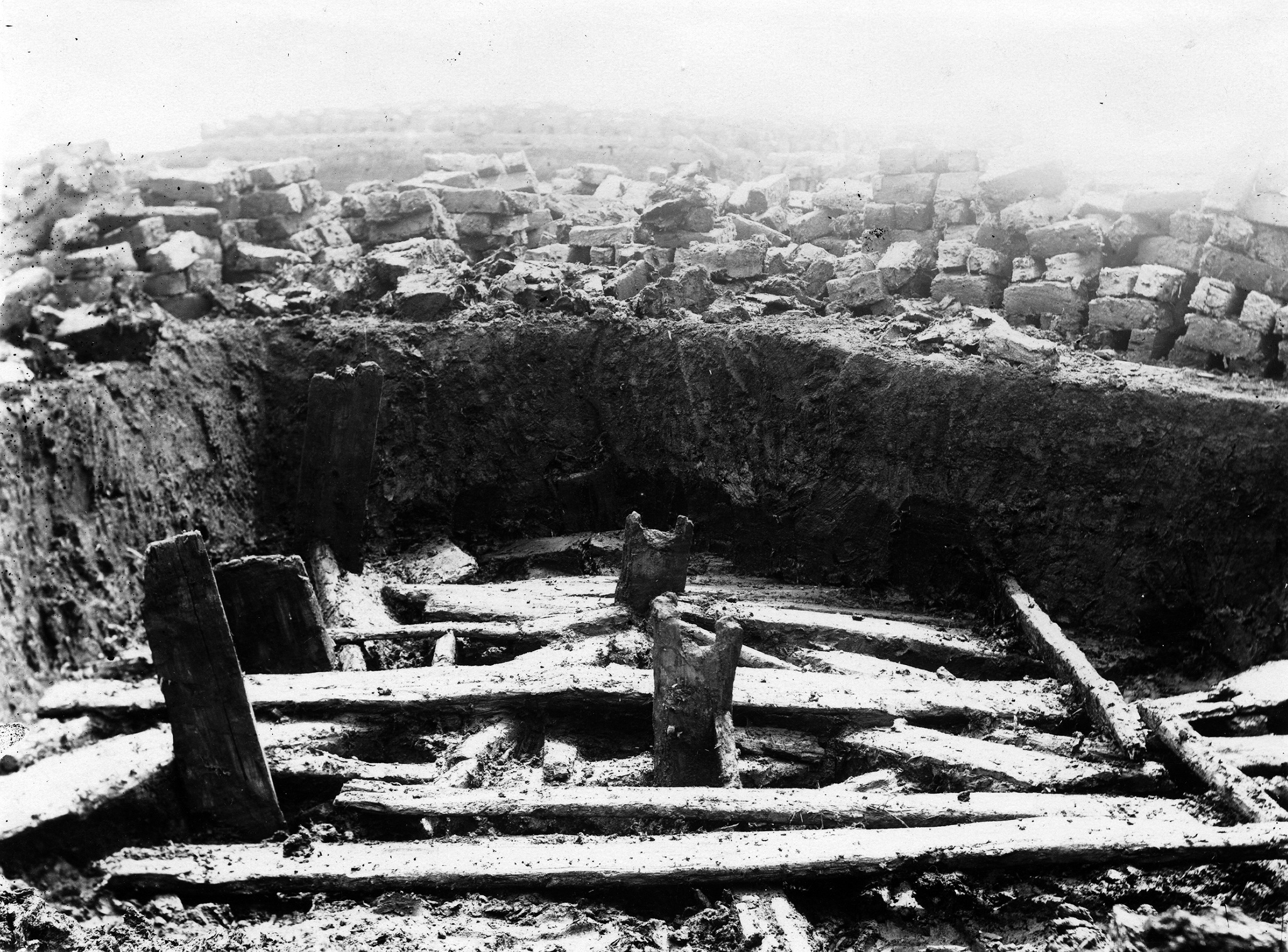
Wittmoor Bog Trackway, Germany. (The trackways date to the 4th and 7th century AD). Photo taken during an excavation.

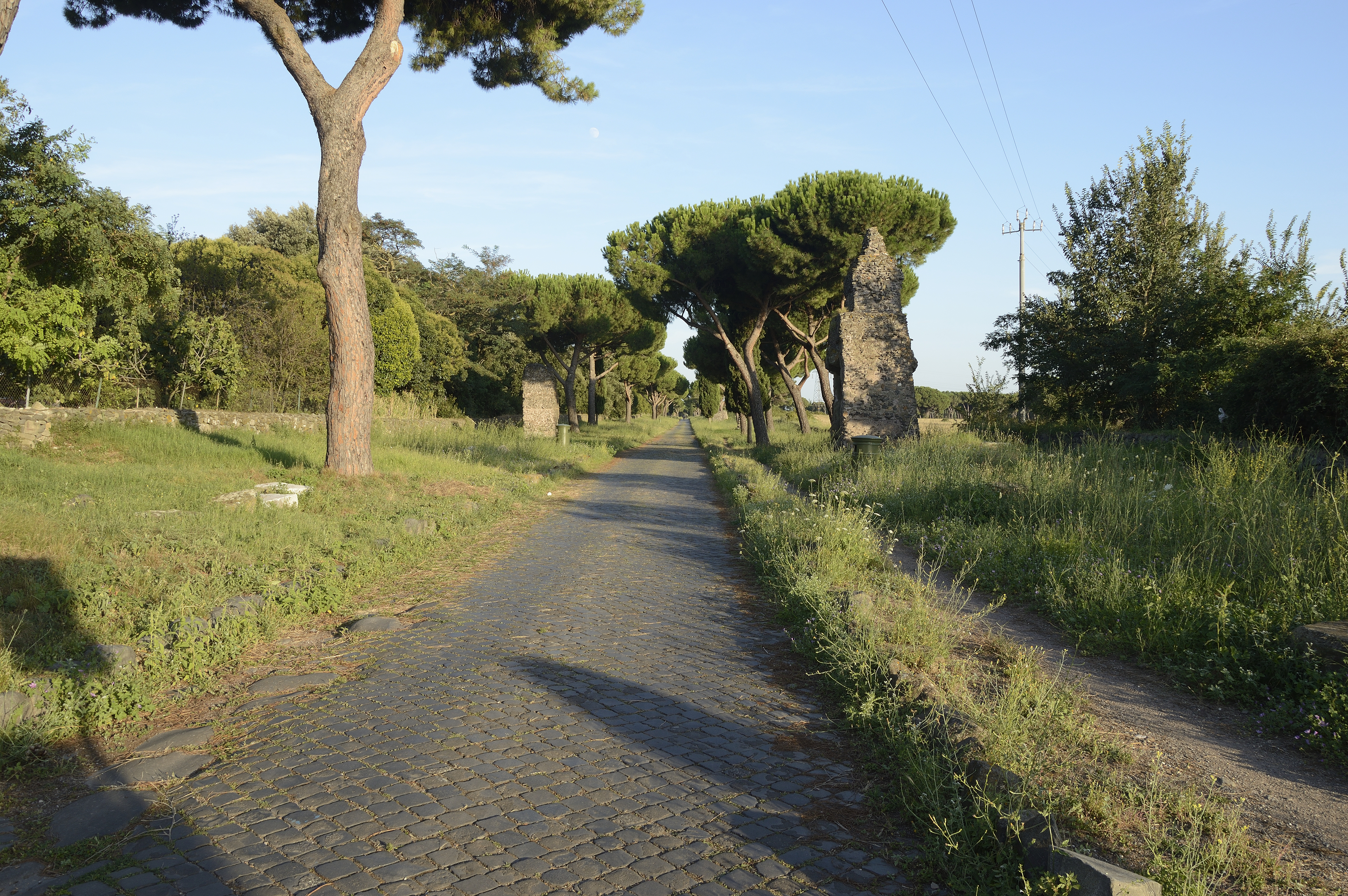
The Roman Appian Way, near Casal Rotondo, to the southeast of Rome, Italy

Historic roads (or historic trails in the US and Canada) are paths or routes that have historical importance due to their use over a period of time. Examples exist from prehistoric times until the early 20th century. They include ancient trackways, long-lasting roads, important trade routes, and migration trails. Many historic routes, such as the Silk Road, the Amber Road, and the Royal Road of the Persian Empire, covered great distances and their impact on human settlements remain today.

The Post Track, a prehistoric causeway in the valley of the River Brue in the Somerset Levels, England, is one of the oldest known constructed trackways and dates from around 3800 BCE. The world's oldest known paved road was constructed in Egypt some time between 2600 and 2200 BC.

The Romans were the most significant road builders of the ancient world. At the peak of the Roman Empire there were more than 400,000 kilometres (250,000 miles) of roads, of which over 80,000 kilometres (50,000 mi) were stone-paved. Another empire, that of the Incas of pre-Columbian South America, also built an extensive and advanced transportation system.

Much later historic roads include the Red River Trails between Canada and the US, from the 19th century. Such pioneer trails often made use of ancient routes created by indigenous people.

== Africa ==
The history of transport in Africa includes some of the earliest paved roads in the world, as well as vast trans-continental trade networks that operated for millennia without formal paving.

=== Ancient Egypt ===
The world's oldest known paved road, the Lake Moeris Quarry Road, is located in Faiyum, Egypt. Dating to the Old Kingdom period (c. 2600–2200 BC), the road was used to transport massive blocks of basalt from quarries to a quay on the shores of Lake Moeris, from where they were shipped to Giza for pyramid construction. The road covers a distance of 12 km (7.5 mi) and was constructed using slabs of sandstone and limestone, with some sections utilizing petrified wood.

Fuad Street in Alexandria, Egypt is over 2,300 years old. The street was designed after the establishment of the city by Alexander the Great by his Architect Dinocrates of Rhodes, who laid the city’s urban layout. It was known as the Canopic Way in the ancient era and was city’s main street.

Later, the Via Hadriana was constructed by the Roman Emperor Hadrian in the 2nd century AD. It connected Antinoöpolis on the Nile river to the Red Sea port of Berenice Troglodytica, facilitating trade with India and the Horn of Africa.

=== Horn of Africa ===
In the Horn of Africa, the Kingdom of Aksum (c. 100–940 AD) maintained a sophisticated network of trade routes connecting the interior highlands to the Red Sea.

- The Adulis-Aksum Route: The most significant ancient artery was the route connecting the port city of Adulis (near modern Massawa, Eritrea) to the imperial capital at Aksum (in northern Ethiopia). This 8-day caravan journey was a vital link in the global trade network connecting the Roman Empire and India. The route facilitated the export of African ivory, gold, and obsidian, and was described in detail in the 1st-century Greco-Roman text Periplus of the Erythraean Sea.
- Salt Caravan Routes: Ancient trails connected the Danakil Depression to the Ethiopian highlands. These routes were used for centuries by caravans to transport rock salt bars (known as Amole), which served as currency throughout the region. The difficult ascent from the depression to the highlands required established paths that remained the primary logistical highway for the region well into the 20th century.

=== Trans-Saharan Trade Routes ===
While not paved in the modern sense, the Trans-Saharan trade routes functioned as permanent highways for the exchange of gold, salt, ivory, and cloth between North Africa and the Sahelian kingdoms. These routes were strictly defined by the location of oases and wells.

- The Darb al-Arba'in (The Forty Days Road) was a famous camel track connecting the Nile Valley (specifically Asyut) to the Darfur region in Sudan. It was used from the Old Kingdom of Egypt until the 19th century to trade livestock, spices, and slaves.
- The Garamantian Routes: The Garamantes, a civilization in the Fezzan (modern Libya), developed a complex network of trade routes through the Sahara as early as 500 BC. They utilized chariots and later camels to control trade between the Roman Mediterranean and sub-Saharan Africa.

=== Roman North Africa ===
The Roman provinces in North Africa (such as Africa Proconsularis and Mauretania) possessed an extensive road network comparable to that of Europe, built to facilitate military movement and the transport of grain.

- The Coastal Highway extended from Carthage (Tunisia) through Leptis Magna (Libya) to Alexandria (Egypt).
- The Limes Tripolitanus was a frontier zone of defense roads and forts protecting the empire from desert incursions, stretching across modern-day Tunisia and Libya.

== Asia ==
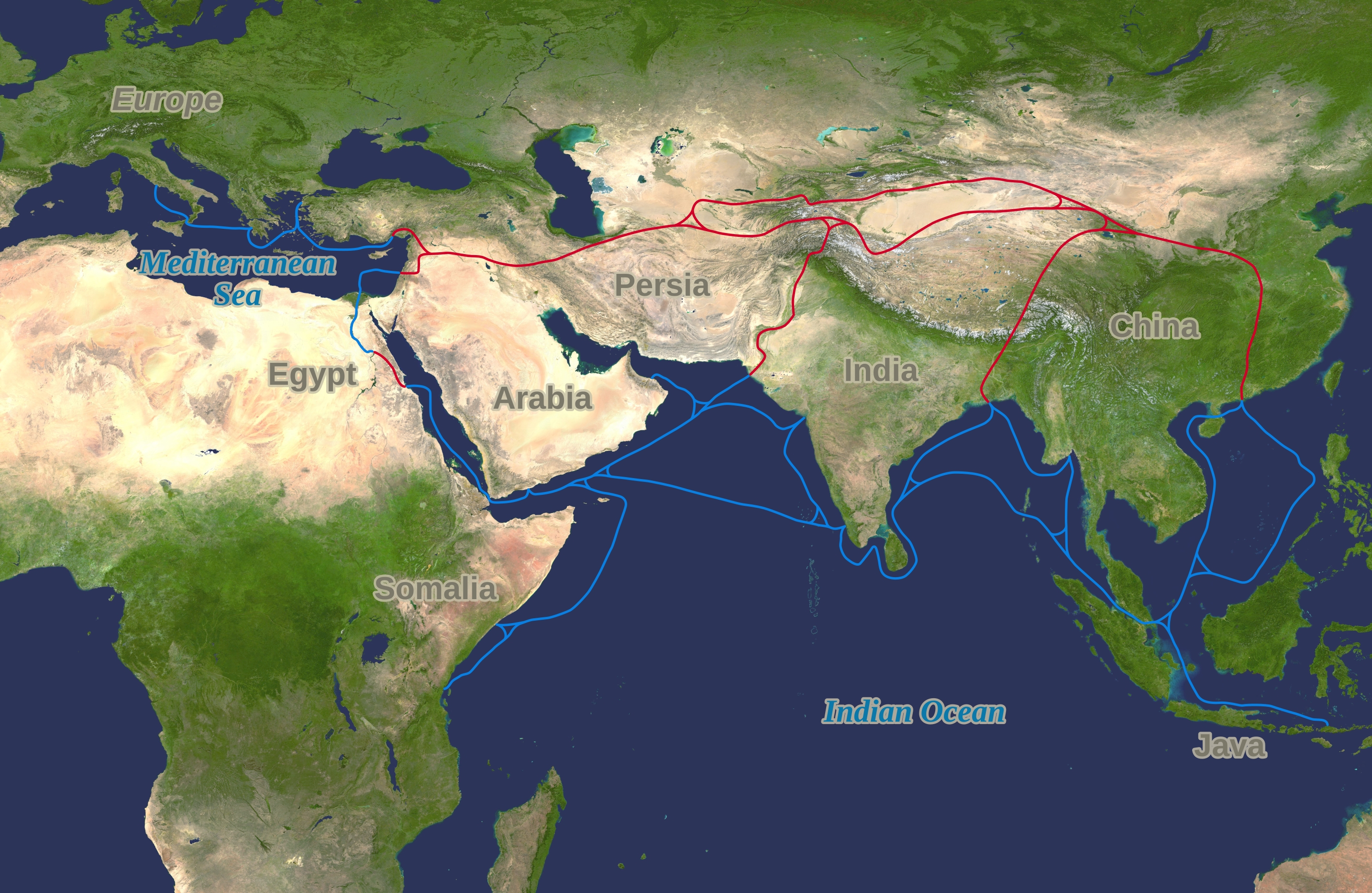
Silk Road. Both the land and sea routes

=== China ===
The Silk Road was a major trade route between China and India, Europe, and Arabia. It derives its name from the lucrative trade in silk carried out along its length, beginning in the Han dynasty (207 BCE–220 CE). The Han dynasty expanded the Central Asian section of the trade routes around 114 BCE through the missions and explorations of the Chinese imperial envoy Zhang Qian. The Chinese took great interest in the safety of their trade products and extended the Great Wall of China to ensure the protection of the trade route.

Prior to the Silk Road an ancient overland route existed through the Eurasian Steppe. Silk and horses were traded as key commodities; secondary trade included furs, weapons, musical instruments, precious stones (turquoise, lapis lazuli, agate, nephrite) and jewels. This route extended for approximately 10,000 km (6,200 mi). Trans-Eurasian trade through the Steppe Route precedes the conventional date for the origins of the Silk Road by at least two millennia.

See also the Northern Silk Road, the Southern Silk Road: Through Khotan, Tea Horse Road.

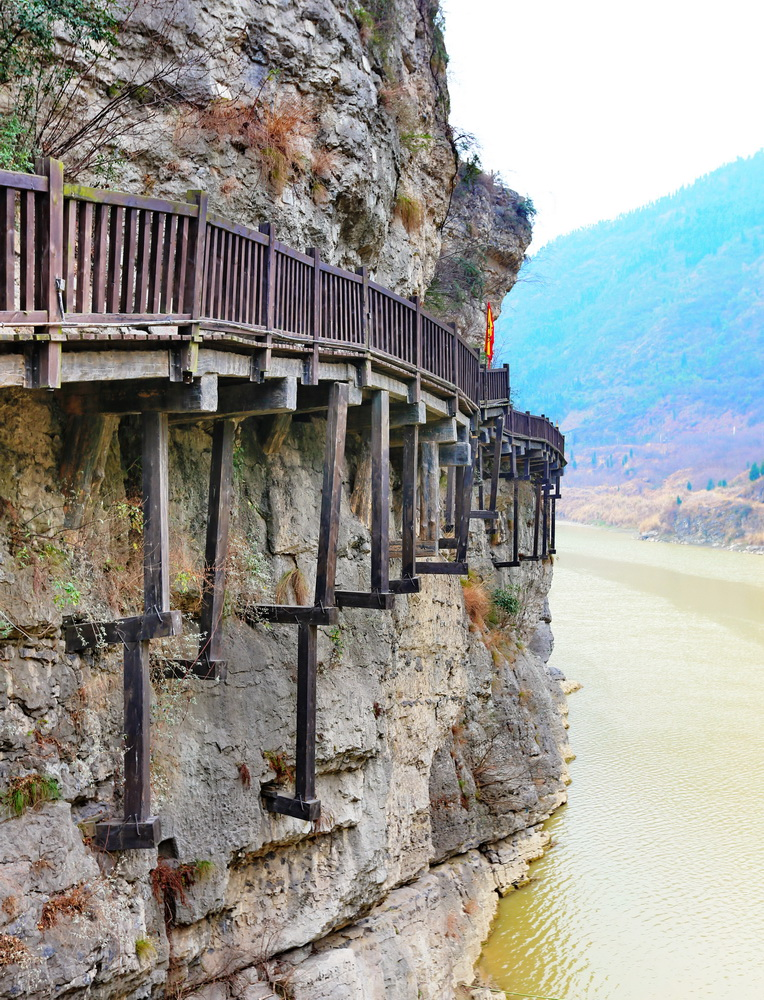
Reconstructed ancient cliff path of Mingyue Gorge, northern Sichuan, China, part of the Shudao road system

The Shudao (Chinese: 蜀道; pinyin: Shǔdào), or the "Road(s) to Shu", is a system of mountain roads linking the Chinese province of Shaanxi with Sichuan (Shu), built and maintained since the 4th century BC. Technical highlights were the gallery roads, consisting of wooden planks erected on wooden or stone beams slotted into holes cut into the sides of cliffs. The roads join three adjacent basins separated and surrounded by high mountains. Like many ancient road systems, the Shu Roads formed a network of major and minor roads with different roads being used at different historical times. However, a number of roads are commonly identified as the main routes.

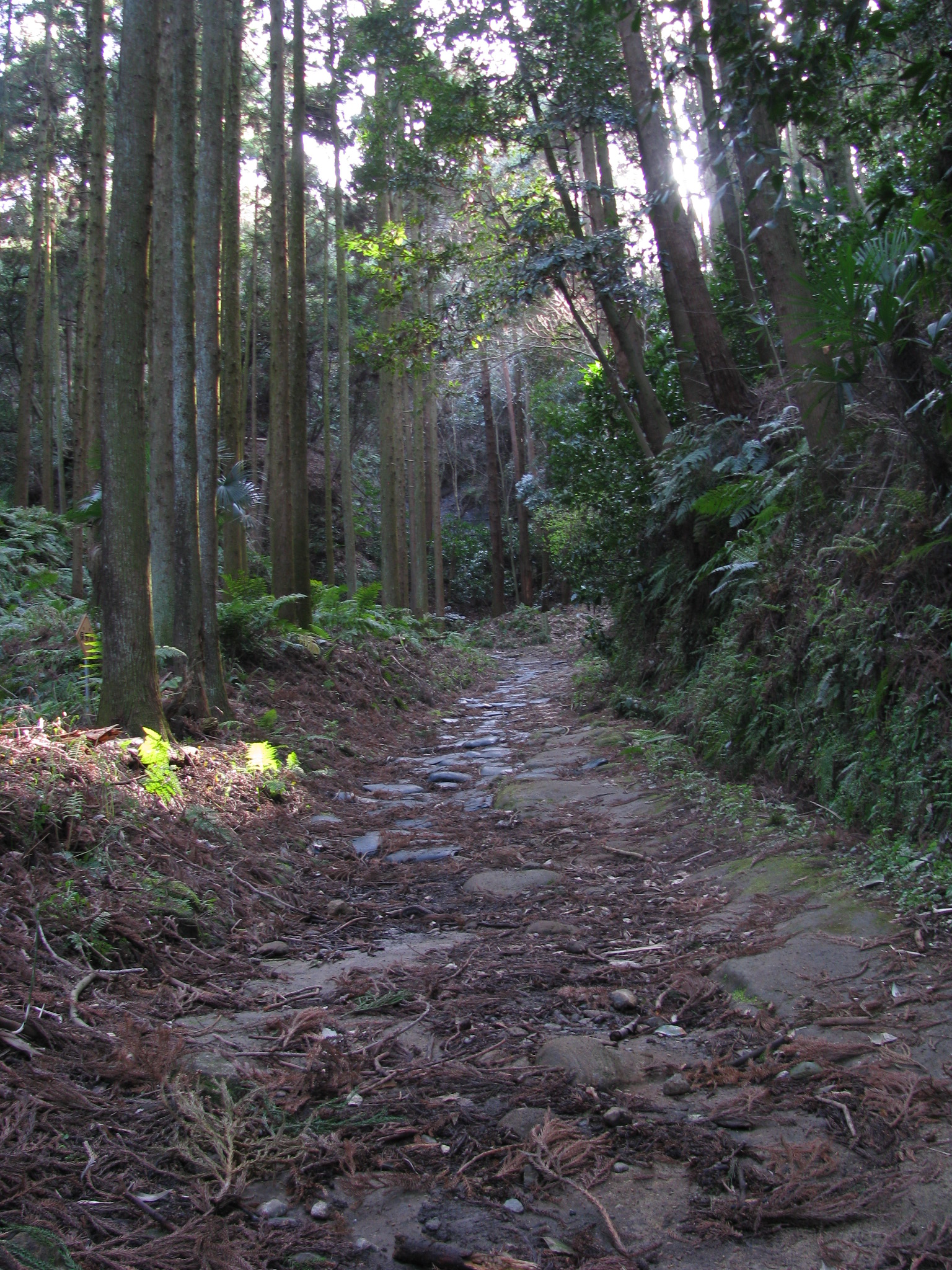
Kamakura Kaidō, Japan

=== Japan ===
Kaidō (街道, road) were roads in Japan dating from the Edo period (between 1603 and 1868). They act important roles in transportation like the Appian Way of ancient Roman roads. Major examples include the Edo Five Routes, all of which started at Edo (modern-day Tokyo). Minor examples include sub-routes such as the Hokuriku Kaidō and the Nagasaki Kaidō.

Kaidō, however, do not include San'yōdō, San'indō, Nankaidō and Saikaidō, which were part of the even more ancient system of Yamato government called Gokishichidō. This was the name for ancient administrative units and the roads within these units, organized in Japan during the Asuka period (AD 538–710), as part of a legal and governmental system borrowed from the Chinese.

Many highways and railway lines in modern Japan follow the ancient routes and carry the same names. The early roads radiated from the capital at Nara or Kyoto. Later, Edo was the reference, and even today Japan reckons directions and measures distances along its highways from Nihonbashi in Chūō, Tokyo.

=== Indian subcontinent ===
The Grand Trunk Road in the Indian subcontinent was the main road from modern day Bangladesh, through what is now India, Pakistan and Afghanistan. A route since antiquity, it was constructed into a coherent highway by the Maurya Empire in 300 BC. Soon after, the Greek diplomat Megasthenes (c. 350 – c. 290 BC) wrote of his travels along the road to reach Hindu kingdoms in the 3rd century BC After invading India over 1,500 years later, Mughals extended the Grand Trunk Road westwards from Lahore to Kabul (the capital of Afghanistan) crossing the Khyber Pass. The road was later improved and extended from Calcutta to Peshawar by the British rulers of colonial India. For many centuries, the road has acted as a major trade route and facilitated travel and postal communication. The Grand Trunk Road remains under use for transportation in India. The Khyber Pass was an all-season mountain pass connecting Afghanistan to western Pakistan.

Brick-paved streets appeared in India as early as 3000 BC.

== Europe ==
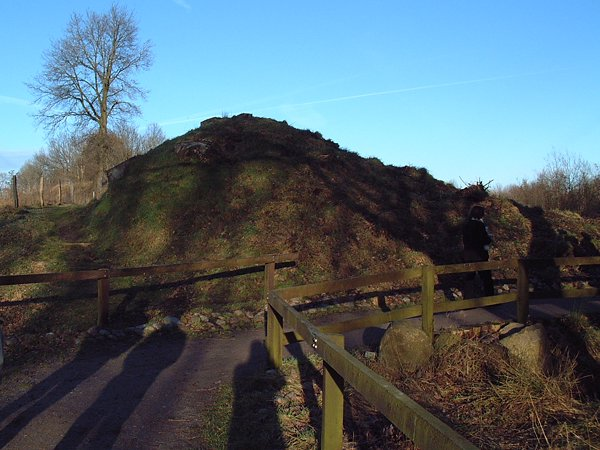
Hærvejen crossing the Dannevirke, in Germany

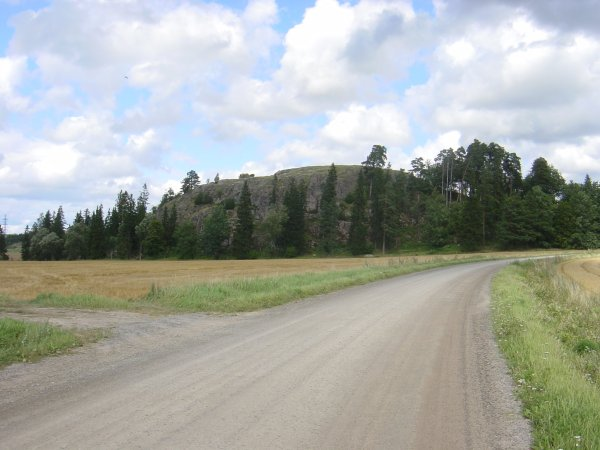
Oxen Road of Tavastia (Hämeen Härkätie) at Lieto, in Finland

Except for Roman roads, European pathways were rarely in good shape and depended on the geography of the region. In the early Middle Ages, people often preferred to travel along elevated drainage divides or ridgeways rather than in the valleys. This was due to thick forests and other natural obstacles in valleys.

The Amber Road was an ancient trade route for the transfer of amber from coastal areas of the North Sea and the Baltic Sea to the Mediterranean Sea. Prehistoric trade routes between Northern and Southern Europe were defined by the amber trade. As an important commodity, sometimes dubbed "the gold of the north", amber was transported overland by way of the Vistula and Dnieper rivers to the Mediterranean area from at least the 16th century BC. The breast ornament of the Egyptian pharaoh Tutankhamen (ca. 1333–1324 BC) contains large Baltic amber beads. The quantity of amber in the Royal Tomb of Qatna, Syria, is unparalleled for known second millennium BC sites in the Levant and the Ancient Near East. From the Black Sea, trade could continue to Asia along the Silk Road.

Hærvejen (Danish, meaning "the army road") ran from Viborg, Denmark through Flensburg (in the present northern German state of Schleswig-Holstein) to Hamburg. The road runs more or less along the watershed of the Jutland Peninsula, known as the Jyske Højderyg (Jutland Ridge), similar to the ridgeways in England. By using this route rivers were avoided, or fords used, close to the rivers sources. Over time by this route was improved with paved fords, embankments and bridges. Concentrations of mounds, defensive ditches, settlements and other historic landmarks can be found along the road and sections of it can be traced back to 4000 BC.

=== Roman roads ===
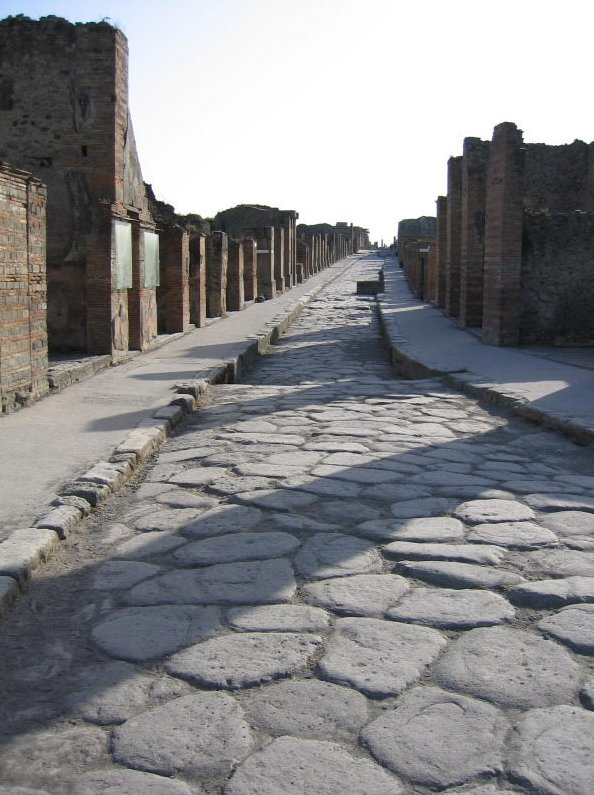
A Roman street in Pompeii

Roman roads were physical infrastructure vital to the maintenance and development of the Roman state, and were built from about 300 BC through the expansion and consolidation of the Roman Republic and the Roman Empire. They ranged from small local roads to broad, long-distance highways built to connect cities, major towns and military bases. These major roads were often stone-paved and metaled, cambered for drainage, and flanked by footpaths, bridleways and drainage ditches. They were laid along accurately surveyed courses, and some were cut through hills, or conducted over rivers and ravines on bridgework. Sections could be supported over marshy ground on rafted or piled foundations.

At the peak of Rome's development, no fewer than 29 great military highways radiated from the capital, and the late Empire's 113 provinces were interconnected by 372 great roads. The whole comprised more than 400,000 kilometres (250,000 miles) of roads, of which over 80,000 kilometres (50,000 mi) were stone-paved. In Gaul alone, no less than 21,000 kilometres (13,000 mi) of roadways are said to have been improved, and in Britain at least 4,000 kilometres (2,500 mi). The courses (and sometimes the surfaces) of many Roman roads survived for millennia; some are overlaid by modern roads. An example of a late Roman road, possibly also dating from the Merovingian era, is the Via Mansuerisca in Belgium.

=== Frankish Empire ===
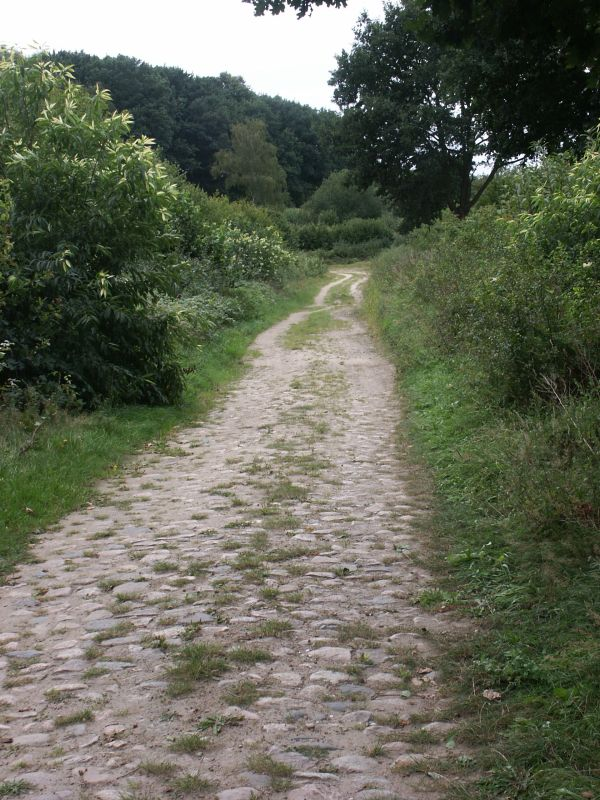
Old Salt Route: historical pavement near Breitenfelde, northern Germany

Francia or the Frankish Empire was the largest post-Roman Barbarian kingdom in Western Europe. It was ruled by the Franks during Late Antiquity and the Early Middle Ages. It is the predecessor of the modern states of France and Germany. After the Treaty of Verdun in 843, West Francia became the predecessor of France, and East Francia became that of Germany.

The Old Salt Route or Alte Salzstraße of the Hanseatic League was a medieval trade route in northern Germany that transported salt from Lüneburg to Lübeck.

The Rennsteig is a ridgeway and an historical boundary path in the Thuringian Forest, Thuringian Highland and Franconian Forest in Central Germany. It was a connecting road between small independent states in Thuringia. The route crosses the Thuringian Forest and the slate mountains of Thuringia and Franconian Forest, stretching from Hörschel at the river Werra (near Eisenach) to Blankenstein at the river Saale. It is part of the European long-distance paths network.

The Via Regia (king's road) is a medieval road that ran from Frankfurt am Main to Görlitz in Lower Silesia, in what is today south-west Poland. See also the Via Regia Lusatiae Superioris.

An important medieval German pilgrim route was the Via Tolosana (because the most important town along the way is Toulouse, France). This is one of the four medieval pilgrim routes described by Aimery Picaud in his 12th-century Pilgrim's Guide, used by pilgrims from southern and eastern Europe on the Way of St James to Santiago de Compostela. See also the Palatine Ways of St. James.

=== Germany ===
The Wittemoor timber trackway is a log causeway or corduroy road across a bog at Neuenhuntdorf, part of the Berne in the district of Wesermarsch in Lower Saxony, Germany. Originating in the pre-Roman Iron Age, it is one of several such causeways which have been found in the North German Plain, particularly in the Weser-Ems region. It has been dated by dendrochronology to 135 BCE. It ran across the Wittemoor bog, connecting the more elevated geest at Hude with the River Hunte. An Iron Age settlement near a spring in the Lintel section of Hude was at the southern end. A section of the trackway has been reconstructed.

Built somewhat later, the Wittmoor Bog Trackways are two historic trackways discovered in Wittmoor in northern Hamburg. The trackways date to the 4th and 7th century AD, both linked the eastern and western shores of the formerly inaccessible, swampy bog. A part of the older trackway No. II dating to the period of the Roman Empire is on display at the permanent exhibition of the Archaeological Museum Hamburg in Harburg, Hamburg.

Hellweg was the official and common name given to main travelling routes medieval trade route through Germany. Their breadth was decreed as an unimpeded passageway a lance's width, about three metres, which the landholders through which the Hellweg passed were required to maintain.

The Kulmer Steig is a byword for transport links from the Elbe valley over the eastern part of the Eastern Ore Mountains to Bohemian Chlumec u Chabařovic (German: Kulm). Archaeological finds suggest that this route existed in the Bronze (c. 1800–750 BC) and the Iron Age (750 BC – early AD) and even in the Neolithic (Stone Age c. 4500–1800 BC)

=== Great Britain ===
==== England ====
The Post Track and Sweet Track, causeways or timber trackways, in the Somerset levels, near Glastonbury, are believed to be the oldest known purpose-built roads in the world and have been dated to the 3800s BC. The tracks were walkways consisting mainly of planks of oak laid end-to-end, supported by crossed pegs of ash, oak, and lime, driven into the underlying peat. and were used to link the fen islands across the marshes. The Lindholme Trackway is later, and dates to around 2900–2500 BC. It fits within a trend of narrowing width and increased sophistication during the third millennium BC. Some argue that this shift could relate to the growing complexity of wheeled transport at the time.

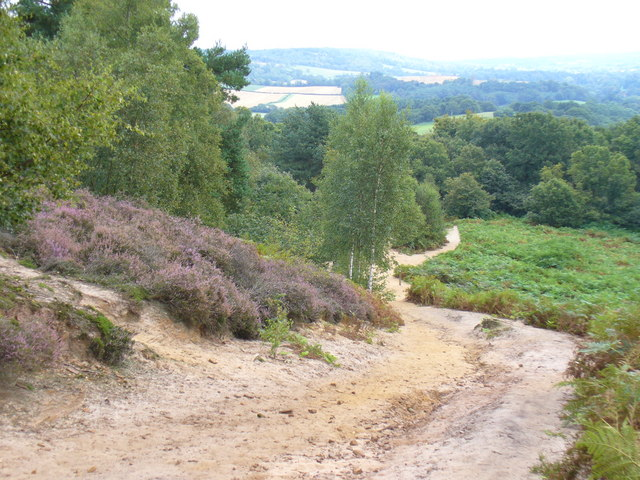
The Pilgrims' Way climbing St Martha's Hill, near Guildford, England

Tracks provided links between farmsteads and fields, other farmsteads, and neighbouring long barrow tombs. They also joined the separate localities to the camp meeting places and cross-country flint roads. Others were more likely to have been processional ways, such as the one leading to the gigantic temple at Avebury in Wiltshire. On British hills, the line of tracks often run a little below the actual crest of a ridge, possibly to afford some shelter from the wind or to avoid travellers presenting themselves to marauders as a target on the skyline.

Examples include the Harrow Way and the Pilgrims' Way, running along the North Downs in southern England. The Harrow Way (also spelled as "Harroway") is another name for the "Old Way", an ancient trackway in the south of England, dated by archaeological finds to 600–450 BC, but probably in existence since the Stone Age. The "Old Way" ran from Seaton in Devon to Dover, Kent. Later the eastern part of the Harrow Way become known as the Pilgrims Way, following the canonisation of Thomas Beckett and the establishment of a shrine in Canterbury, Kent. This pilgrimage route ran from Winchester in Hampshire, via Farnham in Surrey, to Canterbury. The western section of the Harrow Way ends in Farnham, the eastern in Dover.

The Ridgeway similarly keeps to high ground and for at least 5,000 years travellers have used it. The Ridgeway provided a reliable trading route running along chalk hills from the Dorset coast to the Wash in Norfolk. The high dry ground made travel easy and provided a measure of protection by giving traders a commanding view, warning against potential attacks. The Icknield Way follows the chalk escarpment that includes the Berkshire Downs and Chiltern Hills, in southern and eastern England, from Norfolk to Wiltshire.

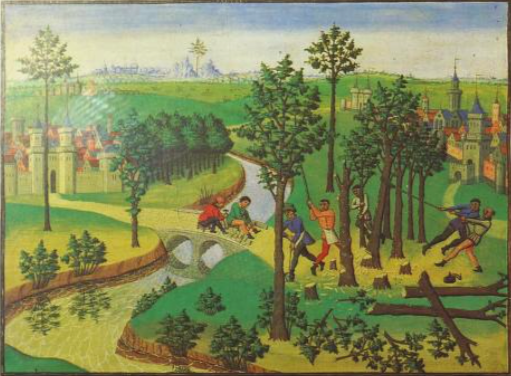
Clearing of path to set a road and bridge during the Medieval period from the Chronicles of Hainaut

Other examples of historic roads in England include the Mariners' Way in Devon, and the Long Causeway – a medieval packhorse route that ran from Sheffield to Hathersage. The Mariners' Way was created in the eighteenth century (or earlier) by sailors who, in travelling across Devon between the ports of Bideford and Dartmouth, linked existing lanes, tracks and footpaths to form a direct route.

==== Scotland ====
In Aberdeenshire, Scotland, ancient tracks include the Elsick Mounth, which was one of the few means of traversing the Grampian Mounth area in prehistoric and medieval times, and the Causey Mounth, an ancient drovers' road over the coastal fringe of the Grampian Mountains. Roman legions marched along the Elsick Mounth.

==== Roman Britain ====
In Roman Britain, there is evidence that trackways were sometimes built upon by the Romans to form the foundations for their roads. Mastiles Lane was a Roman marching road and later an important route for monks leading sheep from Fountains Abbey to summer pasture on higher ground. Also known as the Old Monks' Road, this is now a Dales walking track.

==== Ley lines ====
The existence of ley lines and their relationship with ancient trackways was first suggested in 1921 by the amateur archaeologist Alfred Watkins, in his books Early British Trackways and The Old Straight Track. Watkins theorized that these alignments were created for ease of overland trekking on ancient trackways during neolithic times and had persisted in the landscape over millennia.

=== Greece ===
Improvements in metallurgy meant that by 2000 BC stone-cutting tools were generally available in the Middle East and Greece allowing local streets to be paved. Notably, in about 2000 BC, the Minoans built a 50 km (31-mile) paved road from Knossos in north Crete through the mountains to Gortyn and Lebena, a port on the south coast of the island, which had side drains, a 200 mm (8-inch) thick pavement of sandstone blocks bound with clay-gypsum mortar, covered by a layer of basaltic flagstones and had separate shoulders. This road could be considered superior to any Roman road.

The Via Pythia (or Pythian road) was the route to Delphi. It was revered throughout the Ancient Greek world as the site of the Omphalos stone (the centre of the earth and universe).

The Sacred Way (Ancient Greek: Ἱερὰ Ὁδός, Hierá Hodós), in ancient Greece, was the road from Athens to Eleusis. It was so called because it was the route taken by a procession celebrating the Eleusinian Mysteries. The procession to Eleusis began at the Sacred Gate in the Kerameikos (the Athenian cemetery) on the 19th Boedromion. In the present day, the road from central Athens to Aegaleo and Chaidari (the old route to Eleusis) is called after the ancient road.

=== Ireland ===
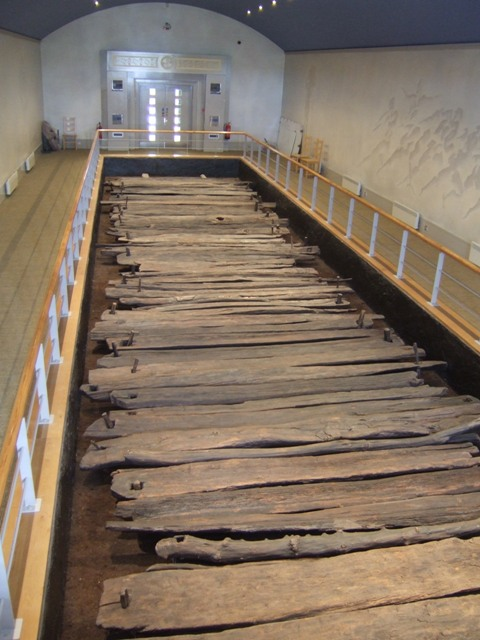
Corlea Trackway, Ireland

The Corlea Trackway is an ancient road built on a bog consisting of packed hazel, birch and alder planks placed lengthways across the track, and occasional cross timbers for support. Other bog trackways or "toghers" have also been discovered dating to around 4000 BC. The Corlea trackway dates from approx 148 BC and was excavated in 1994. It is the largest trackway of its kind to be uncovered in Europe.

Ireland's prehistoric roads were minimally developed, but oak-plank pathways covered many bog areas, and five great 'ways' (Irish: slighe) converged at the Hill of Tara. An ancient avenue or trackway in Ireland is located at Rathcroghan Mound and the surrounding earthworks within a 370m circular enclosure.

The Esker Riada, a series of glacial eskers formed at the end of the last Ice Age, formed an elevated pathway from east to west, connecting Galway to Dublin.

=== Russia ===
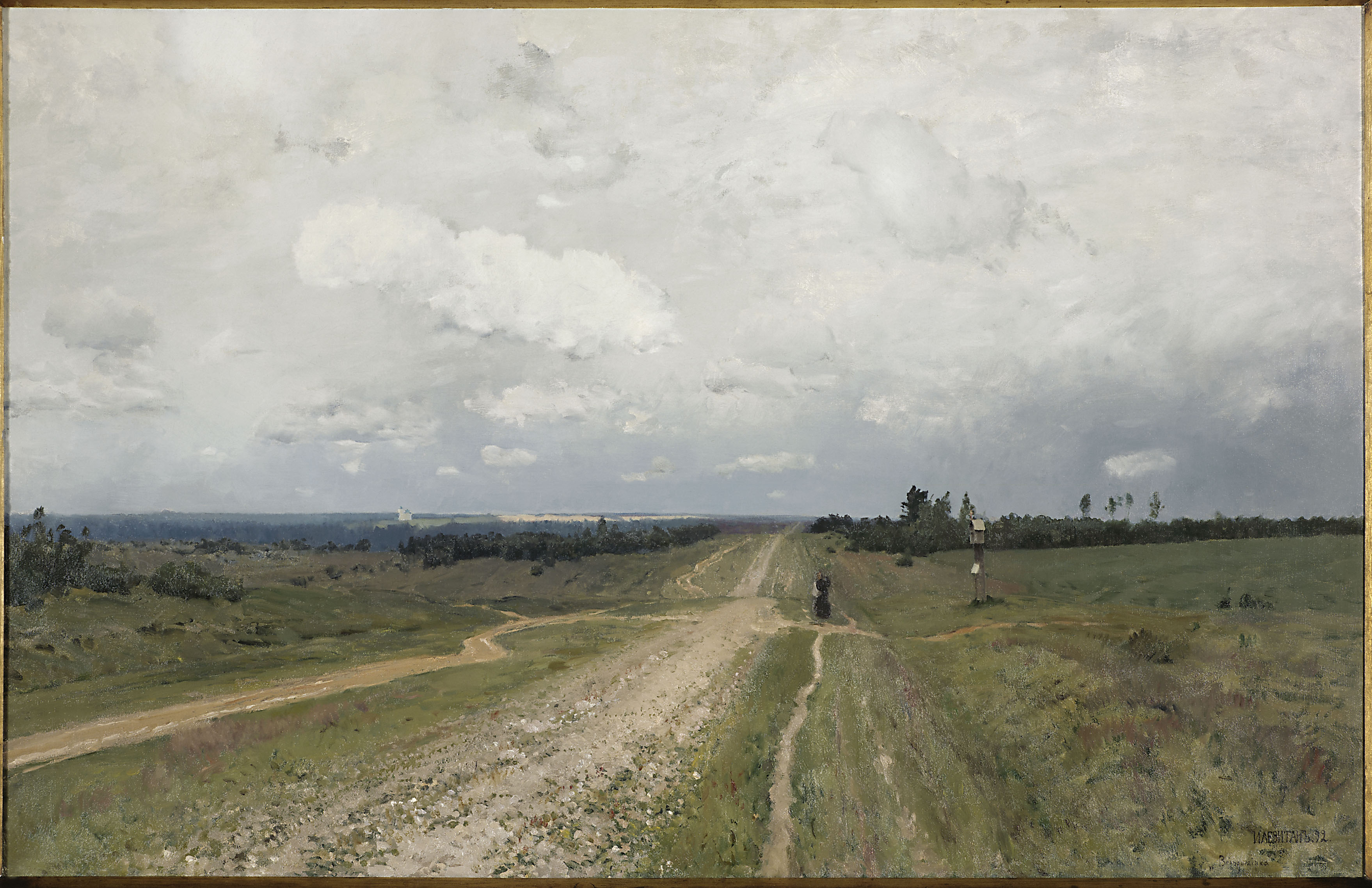
In Isaak Levitan's well-known "mood landscape", the Vladimir Highway, or Vladimirka, takes on a symbolic meaning.

The Siberian Route (Russian: Сибирский тракт, Sibirsky trakt), also known as the "Moscow Highway" and "Great Highway", was a historic route that connected European Russia to Siberia and China.

The construction of the road was decreed by the Tsar two months after the conclusion of the Treaty of Nerchinsk, on 22 November 1689, but it did not start until 1730 and was not finished until the mid-19th century. Previously, Siberian transport had been mostly by river via Siberian River Routes. First Russian settlers arrived in Siberia by the Cherdyn river route which was superseded by the Babinov overland route in the late 1590s. The town of Verkhoturye in the Urals was the most eastern point of the Babinov Road.

The much longer Siberian route started in Moscow as the Vladimir Highway (a medieval road) and passed through Murom, Kozmodemyansk, Kazan, Perm, Kungur, Yekaterinburg, Tyumen, Tobolsk, Tara, Kainsk, Tomsk, Yeniseysk and Irkutsk. After crossing Lake Baikal the road split near Verkhneudinsk. One branch continued east to Nerchinsk while the other went south to the border post of Kyakhta where it linked to camel caravans that crossed Mongolia to a Great Wall gate at Kalgan.

In the early 19th century, the route was moved to the south. From Tyumen the road proceeded through Yalutorovsk, Ishim, Omsk, Tomsk, Achinsk and Krasnoyarsk before rejoining the older route at Irkutsk. It remained a vital artery connecting Siberia with Moscow and Europe until the last decades of the 19th century, when it was superseded by the Trans-Siberian Railway (built 1891–1916), and the Amur Cart Road (built 1898–1909). The contemporary equivalent is the Trans-Siberian Highway.

== Middle East ==
The region has served as a crossroads for trade and military movement between Africa, Asia, and Europe for millennia, resulting in some of the world's earliest documented road systems.

=== Mesopotamia and Persia ===
Streets paved with cobblestones appeared in the city of Ur in modern-day Iraq dating back to 4000 BC.

The Royal Road was an ancient highway reorganized and rebuilt by the Persian king Darius the Great (Darius I) of the first (Achaemenid) Persian Empire in the 5th century BCE. Darius built the road to facilitate rapid communication throughout his very large empire from Susa, Iran to Sardis, Turkey. The mounted couriers of the Royal Road, the Angarium, were famously praised by Herodotus for their speed and reliability.

The Khorasan Road (later part of the Silk Road) connected Mesopotamia to the Iranian Plateau and Central Asia, serving as a primary conduit for East-West trade.

=== The Levant ===
Two primary north-south highways dominated the ancient Levant, facilitating trade between Egypt and Mesopotamia:

- The Via Maris (Latin: "Way of the Sea") ran along the Mediterranean coast from the Nile Delta, through the Jezreel Valley, towards Damascus. It was the most important route for international traffic during the Bronze Age and Iron Age.
- The King's Highway ran inland along the Transjordanian plateau, from the Gulf of Aqaba north to Damascus. This route is mentioned in the Bible (Numbers 20:17) and was vital for the kingdoms of Edom, Moab, and Ammon. In the Roman period, Emperor Trajan rebuilt this route as the Via Traiana Nova.

=== Arabian Peninsula ===
The Incense Route was a network of major land and sea trading routes linking the Mediterranean world with Eastern and Southern sources of incense, spices, and other luxury goods. The route stretched from ports in Yemen and Oman through the Arabian desert to the port city of Gaza and the Nabataean Kingdom's capital at Petra.

During the Abbasid Caliphate, extensive road systems were developed to facilitate the Hajj pilgrimage to Mecca. The most famous of these was the Zubaydah Trail, which ran from Kufa in Iraq to Mecca. Commissioned by Queen Zubaidah bint Ja'far in the 8th century CE, the road was an engineering feat equipped with cisterns, wells, and milestones to support travelers across the desert.

== North America ==
It is claimed that some of the earliest roads were created by humans who followed already existing paths made by animals, and, in particular, that trails created by the herds of buffalo shaped the routes taken first by indigenous peoples and then colonists, especially in North America:

The buffalo, because of his sagacious selection of the most sure and most direct courses, has influenced the routes of trade and travel of the white race as much, possibly, as he influenced the course of the red-men in earlier days. There is great truth in Thomas Benton's figure when he said that the buffalo blazed the way for the railways to the Pacific. That sagacious animal undoubtedly "blazed"—with his hoofs on the surface of the earth—the course of many of our roads, canals, and railways. That he found the points of least resistance across our great mountain ranges there can be little doubt. It is certain that he discovered Cumberland Gap and his route through that pass in the mountains has been accepted as one of the most important on the continent. It is also obvious that the buffalo found the course from Atlantic waters to the head of the Great Kanawha, and that he opened a way from the Potomac to the Ohio. How important these strategic points are now considered is evident from the fact that a railway crosses the mountains at each of them; the New York Central, the Baltimore and Ohio, the Pennsylvania, and the Chesapeake and Ohio cross the first great divide in the eastern portion of our country on routes selected centuries ago by the plunging buffalo. One of the most interesting of specific examples of a railway following an ancient highway of buffalo and Indian is to be found on the Baltimore and Ohio.

However, Frank G. Roe disputes this theory – and its wider application – in "The 'Wild Animal Path' Origin of Ancient Roads".

Some suggest that the portage routes of North American indigenous peoples followed "the game trails the animals had made around rough water. ... [And] as centuries passed, well-trodden paths were made, winding among the rocks, and, by the easiest of grades, over or around hills".

=== United States ===
A complex system of prehistoric trails are located at Tumamoc Hill near Tucson, Arizona where archaeological traces have been found including petroglyphs, pottery shards and mortar holes. Chaco Canyon in northern New Mexico consists of fifteen major complexes and a system of trails. Timber beams used to construct the cliff dwellings were hauled long distances to the site along the trails. The sixty-mile long ancient Great Hopewell Road of the Adena, Hopewell and Fort Ancient cultures of Ohio connected the Newark Earthworks to the mound group at Chillicothe.

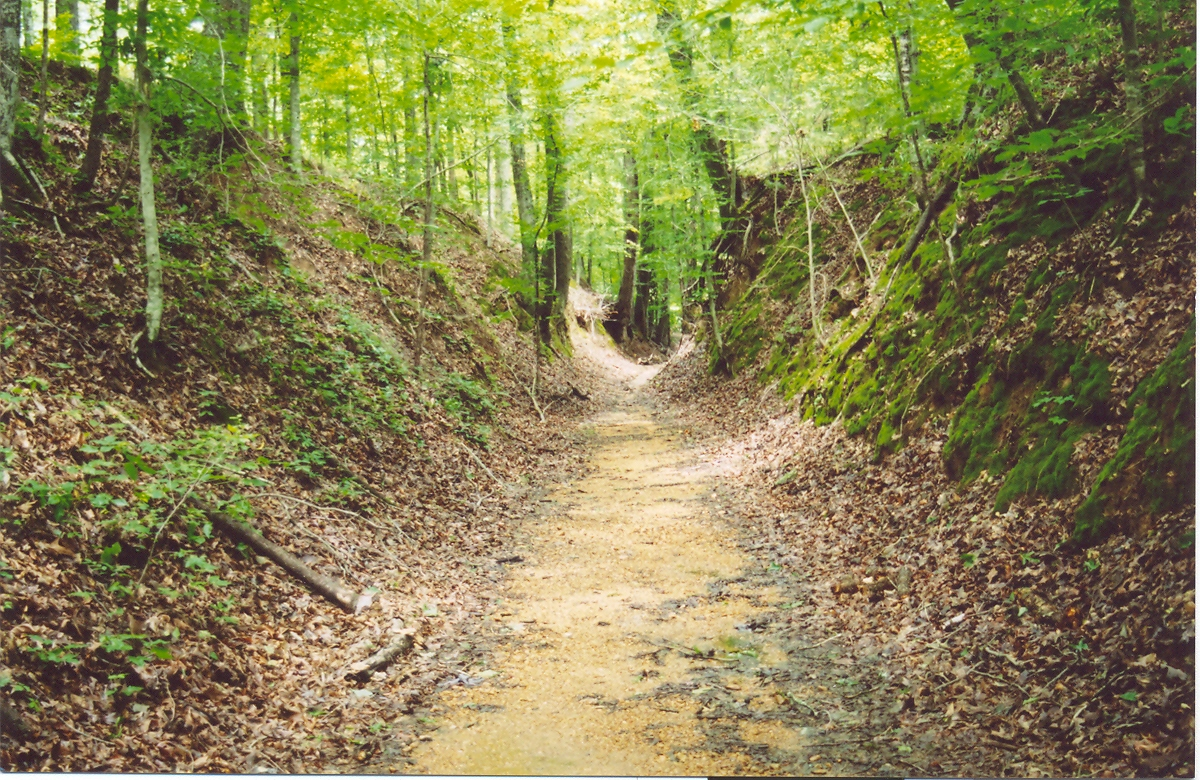
Sunken stretch of the Natchez Trace

The Natchez Trace is a historic forest trail within the United States which extends roughly 440 miles (710 km) from Natchez, Mississippi, to Nashville, Tennessee, linking the Cumberland, Tennessee, and Mississippi Rivers. The trail was created and used by Native Americans for centuries, and was later used by early European and American explorers, traders, and emigrants in the late 18th and early 19th centuries. Today, the path is commemorated by the 444-mile (715 km) Natchez Trace Parkway, which follows the approximate path of the Trace, as well as the related Natchez Trace Trail. Parts of the original trail are still accessible and some segments are listed on the National Register of Historic Places.

In the American Old West, the Oregon Trail was a 19th-century pioneer route from Illinois to Oregon, much of which was also used by the Mormon Trail and California Trail. The Santa Fe Trail was a major commercial and military artery from Missouri to Santa Fe, New Mexico. In modern times, the Lincoln Highway (dedicated 1913) was the first road for the automobile across the United States of America, spanning 3389 miles coast-to-coast from New York City to San Francisco.

The Mojave Road (also known as Mohave Trail) was a historical footpath and pack trail used by pre-contact desert-dwelling indigenous people that was later followed by Spanish missionaries, explorers, colonizers and settlers. Its course ran across the Mojave Desert between watering holes approximately 60 miles (97 km) apart.

==== Corduroy road ====
Corduroy roads are made by placing logs, perpendicular to the direction of the road over a low or swampy area, and were used extensively in the American Civil War, between Shiloh and Corinth after the battle of Shiloh, and in Sherman's march through the Carolinas

==== Plank road ====
A plank road is a road composed of wooden planks or puncheon logs, which were commonly found in the Canadian province of Ontario as well as the Northeast and Midwest of the United States in the first half of the 19th century. They were often built by turnpike companies.

The Plank Road Boom was an economic boom that happened in the United States. Largely in the Eastern United States and New York, the boom lasted from 1844 to the mid 1850s. In about 10 years, over 3,500 miles (5,600 km) of plank road were built in New York alone–enough road to go from Manhattan, New York to California, and more than 10,000 miles (16,000 km) of plank road were built countrywide.

=== Canada ===
In Canada, the Carlton Trail was a fur trade route from south-west Manitoba to Fort Edmonton in Alberta.

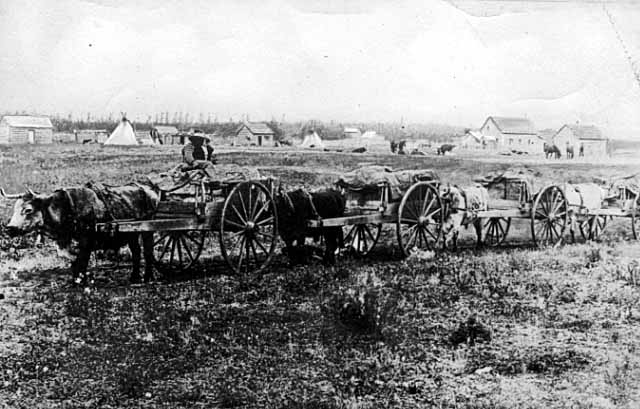
Red River ox cart train on the Carlton Trail

The Red River Trails were a network of ox cart routes connecting the Red River Colony (the Selkirk Settlement) and Fort Garry in British North America with the head of navigation on the Mississippi River in the United States. These trade routes ran from the location of present-day Winnipeg in the Canadian province of Manitoba across the Canada–United States border, and thence by a variety of routes through what is now the eastern part of North Dakota and western and central Minnesota to Mendota and Saint Paul, Minnesota on the Mississippi.

Travellers began to use the trails by the 1820s, with the heaviest use from the 1840s to the early 1870s, when they were superseded by railways. Until then, these cartways provided the most efficient means of transportation between the isolated Red River Colony and the outside world. They gave the Selkirk colonists and their neighbours, the Métis people, an outlet for their furs and a source of supplies other than the Hudson's Bay Company, which was unable to enforce its monopoly in the face of the competition that used the trails.

== South America ==
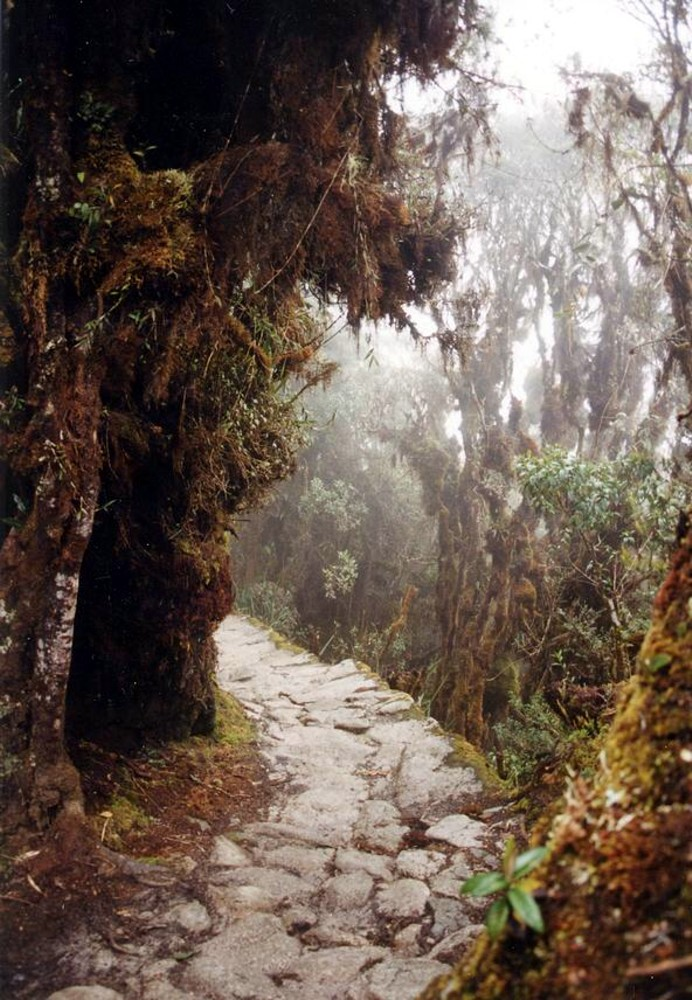
Trail to Machu Picchu. Much of the trail is of original Inca construction.

The Inca road system was the most extensive and advanced transportation system in pre-Columbian South America. It was about 39,900 kilometres (24,800 mi) long. The construction of the roads required a large expenditure of time and effort. The network was based on two north–south roads with numerous branches. The best known portion of the road system is the Inca Trail to Machu Picchu. Part of the road network was built by cultures that precede the Inca Empire, notably the Wari culture. During the Spanish colonial era, parts of the road system were given the status of Camino Real. In 2014 the road system became a UNESCO World Heritage Site.

In Peru part of the Inca road system crossed the Andes to connect areas of the Inca Empire.

== See also ==
- Ancient road in Tarsus, Turkey.
- Bishop's Road (Meißen–Stolpen). Germany.
- Bog of Allen, Ireland
- Camino Real de Tierra Adentro. Mexico.
- Great Indian Warpath. Native American trail, in USA.
- History of road transport
- Incense Route
- Jerusalem pilgrim road
- King's Highway (ancient)
- List of medieval roads in Romania.
- List of Ontario colonization roads. Canada.
- Old Dresden to Teplitz Post Road
- Old Freiberg to Teplitz Post Road
- Pre-Islamic Arab trade
- Ridgeway (road)
- Sacbe: paved road built by the Maya civilization of pre-Columbian Mesoamerica.
- Stock route. Australian drovers' road.
- Sunken lane
- Toll road
  - Toll roads in Great Britain.
- Trade routes.
- Via Imperii. Germany.
- Via Maris: linking Egypt with the northern empires of Syria, Anatolia and Mesopotamia
- Way of the Patriarchs. Israel
- Magna Via. Central Europe
