= List of Vidarbha cricketers =

This is a list of cricketers who have played cricket for the Vidarbha Cricket Association.

== A ==
- Anilkumar Abhayankar (1939–2016)
- Chandrashekhar Atram (born 1983)
- Madhusudan Acharya (born 1984)
- R. N. Abhyankar
- Imran Ali

== B ==
- Ashok Bhagwat (born 1947)
- Swapnil Bandiwar (born 1988)
- Nachiket Bhute (born 1999)
- Ganesh Bhosle (born 2001)
- Varun Bisht (born 2004)
- Rohit Binkar

== C ==
- Rahul Chikhalkar (born 1983)
- Abhishek Chaurasia (born 1991)
- Aniruddha Chore (born 1991)

== D ==
- Madhav Dalvi (1925–2012)
- Dinkar Deshpande (born 1937)
- Ramesh Dewan (born 1938)
- Sudhir Dhagamwar (1951–2010)
- Anil Deshpande (born 1952)
- Manish Dosi (born 1973)
- Amit Deshpande (born 1981)
- Shubham Dubey (born 1994)
- Adhyayan Daga (born 1999)
- Shivam Deshmukh (born 2001)
- Harsh Dubey (born 2002)

== F ==
- Faiz Fazal (born 1985)

== G ==
- Vikas Gawate (born 1960)
- Samir Gujar (born 1967)
- Pritam Gandhe (born 1971)
- Yogesh Ghare (born 1971)
- Ulhas Gandhe (born 1974)
- Rajneesh Gurbani (born 1993)
- VD Gosavi

== H ==
- Praveen Hingnikar (born 1966)
- Praful Hinge (born 2002)

== I ==
- Sadashiv Iyer (born 1972)

== J ==
- Madan Joshi (born 1936)
- Amol Jichkar (1978 - 2017)
- Ravi Jangid (born 1987)
- Amol Jungade (born 1989)

== K ==
- Kamraj Kesari (1922–1985)
- Gajanan Kathaley (1946–2014)
- Sulakshan Kulkarni (born 1967)
- Samir Khare (born 1981)
- Akshay Kolhar (born 1988)
- Viraj Kadbe (born 1989)
- Akshay Karnewar (born 1992)
- Shubham Kapse (born 1994)
- Kushal Kakad (born 1995)
- Yash Kadam (born 1999)
- Prakash Khot

== M ==
- M. N. Manian (born 1939)
- Dinesh Mirkar
- Aman Mokhade (born 2001)
- Danish Malewar (born 2003)

== N ==
- R. Narasimhan (1931–1990)
- Vivek Naidu (born 1979)
- Alind Naidu (born 1983)
- Siddhesh Neral (born 1994)
- Darshan Nalkande (born 1998)

== O ==
- Arun Ogiral (1942–2004)

== P ==
- Vijay Pimprikar
- Madan Pande (1943–2014)
- Suhas Phadkar (born 1954)
- Rashmi Parida (born 1977)
- Urvesh Patel (born 1988)
- Amit Paunikar (born 1988)
- Dipesh Parwani (born 2000)

== R ==
- Syed Rahim (1929–2014)
- Murthy Rajan (born 1944)
- Sumit Ruikar (born 1990)
- Rushabh Rathod (born 1994)
- Sanjay Raghunath (born 1995)
- Parth Rekhade (born 1999)
- Yash Rathod (born 2000)

== S ==
- Prabhakar Sathe (died 2007)
- Wasuderao Sane (1914–1991)
- Chandu Sarwate (1920–2003)
- Madhukar Sathe (born 1934)
- Sudhir Sahu (1938–2011)
- Mohammad Siddique (1944–2009)
- Prasad Shetty (born 1961)
- Piyush Sadhu (1977–2014)
- Sandeep Singh (born 1981)
- Azhar Sheikh (born 1985)
- Shalabh Srivastava (born 1986)
- Karn Sharma (born 1987)
- Pranjal Sangole (born 1989)
- Aditya Sarwate (born 1989)
- Aditya Shanware (born 1991)
- Dhruv Shorey (born 1992)
- Jitesh Sharma (born 1993)
- Ravikumar Samarth (born 1993)

== T ==
- Vishweshwar Thool (1946–2014)
- Vijay Telang (1952–2013)
- Rakesh Tandon (born 1953)
- Sharad Thakre (1968–2014)
- Ravikumar Thakur (born 1984)
- Yash Thakur (born 1998)
- Aditya Thakare (born 1998)
- Atharva Taide (born 2000)

== U ==
- Ashok Upadhyay (born 1953)
- Gaurav Upadhyay (born 1988)
- Amol Ubarhande (born 1988)

== V ==
- Prashant Vaidya (born 1967)
- R. Venkataraman

== W ==
- Hemant Wasu (born 1960)
- Akshay Wakhare (born 1985)
- Shrikant Wagh (born 1988)
- Apoorv Wankhade (born 1992)
- Akshay Wadkar (born 1994)
- Siddhesh Wath (born 1997)

== Y ==
- Baburao Yadav (born 1982)
- Umesh Yadav (born 1987)
- Lalit Yadav (born 1995)
