= Amol (disambiguation) =

Amol is a city in Iran.

Amol, AMOL, etc. may also refer to:

- Amol County, an administrative subdivision of Iran
- attomole, symbol: amole, a unit of amount
- Amol language, a language of Papua New Guinea
- Acute monocytic leukemia, blood disorder
- A Memory of Light, title of the final book of The Wheel of Time by Robert Jordan
- Automated Measurement of Lineups, technology used by Nielsen Ratings to track the TV program being transmitted
- Amol, a fictional character in the 2023 Indian film Pathaan

== People with the name ==
- Amol Aggarwal, American mathematician
- Amol Ratan Balwadkar, Indian social worker
- Amol Bose, Bangladeshi actor
- Amol Dighe, Indian physicist
- Amol Gole, Indian cinematographer
- Amol Haribhau Jawale, Indian politician
- Amol Jichkar, Indian cricketer
- Amol Jungade, Indian cricketer
- Amol Kale, Indian cricket administrator
- Amol Khatal, Indian politician
- Amol Kolhe, Indian actor and politician
- Amol Arvindrao Kulkarni, Indian chemist
- Amol Mitkari, Indian activist and politician
- Amol Muzumdar, Indian cricketer
- Amol Palekar, Indian actor and director
- Amol Parashar, Indian actor
- Amol Rajan, Indian journalist
- Amol Rathod, Indian cinematographer
- Amol Redij, Indian writer
- Amol Sarva, American entrepreneur
- Amol Shinde, Indian cricketer
- Amol Ubarhande, Indian cricketer

== See also ==
- Amole (disambiguation)
- Amul (disambiguation)
- Amulya, Indian actress
