= Baburao =

Baburao or Babu Rao is an Indian name which may refer to:

== People ==
- Baburao Bagul (1930–2008), Indian Marathi writer
- Baburao Chinchansur (born 1951), Indian politician
- Baburao Kadam (born 1968), Indian politician
- Baburao Kale (born 1926), Indian politician
- Baburao Narsingrao Kokate (Adaskar) (died 2016), Indian politician
- Babu Rao Mediyam (born 1951), Indian politician
- Baburao Baboo Nimal (1908–1998), Indian field hockey player
- Baburao Pacharne (died 2022), Indian politician
- Baburao Painter, Indian film director Baburao Krishnarao Mestri (1890–1954)
- Baburao Paranjpe (1922–1999), Indian politician
- Baburao Patel (1904–1982), Indian publisher and writer
- Baburao Pendharkar (1896–1967), Indian actor, director, film producer and writer
- Baburao Sadwelkar (1928–2000), Indian painter, art writer, educator and administrator
- Baburao Shedmake (1833–1858), Indian rebel and Gond chieftain
- Baburao Govindrao Shirke (1918–2010), Indian businessman and company founder and CEO
- Baburao Yadav (born 1982), Indian cricketer
- Golla Babu Rao (born 1954), Indian politician
- Kadiri Babu Rao (born 1959), Indian politician
- Prataprao Baburao Bhosale (1934–2024), Indian politician
- Sunil Baburao Mendhe (born 1968), Indian politician
- Mohite Subodh Baburao (born 1961), Indian politician

== Fictional characters ==
- Baburao Ganpatrao Apte, in the Hera Pheri film series
