= Bishop's Road (Meißen–Stolpen) =

Ancient road in Saxony

The Bishop's Road (German: Bischofsweg) is an ancient road in Saxony, going from Meißen via Dresden to Stolpen.

== Route ==
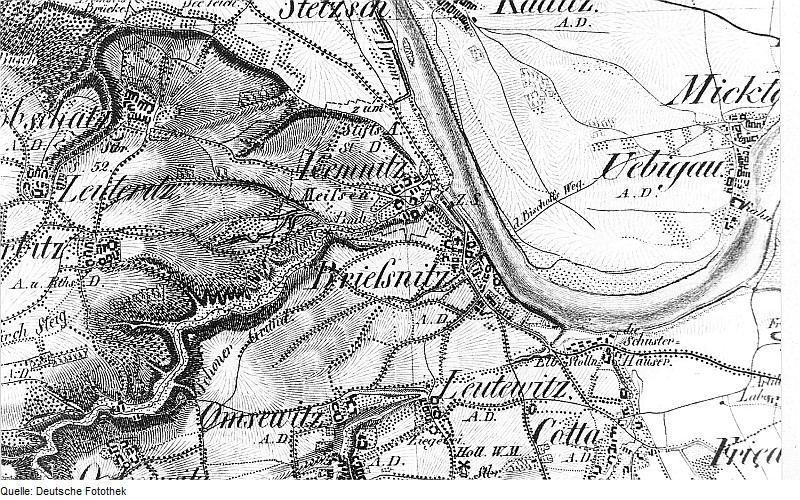
The "Bischoffs Weg" between Briesnitz and Mickten on the Oberreitschen map, early 19th Century

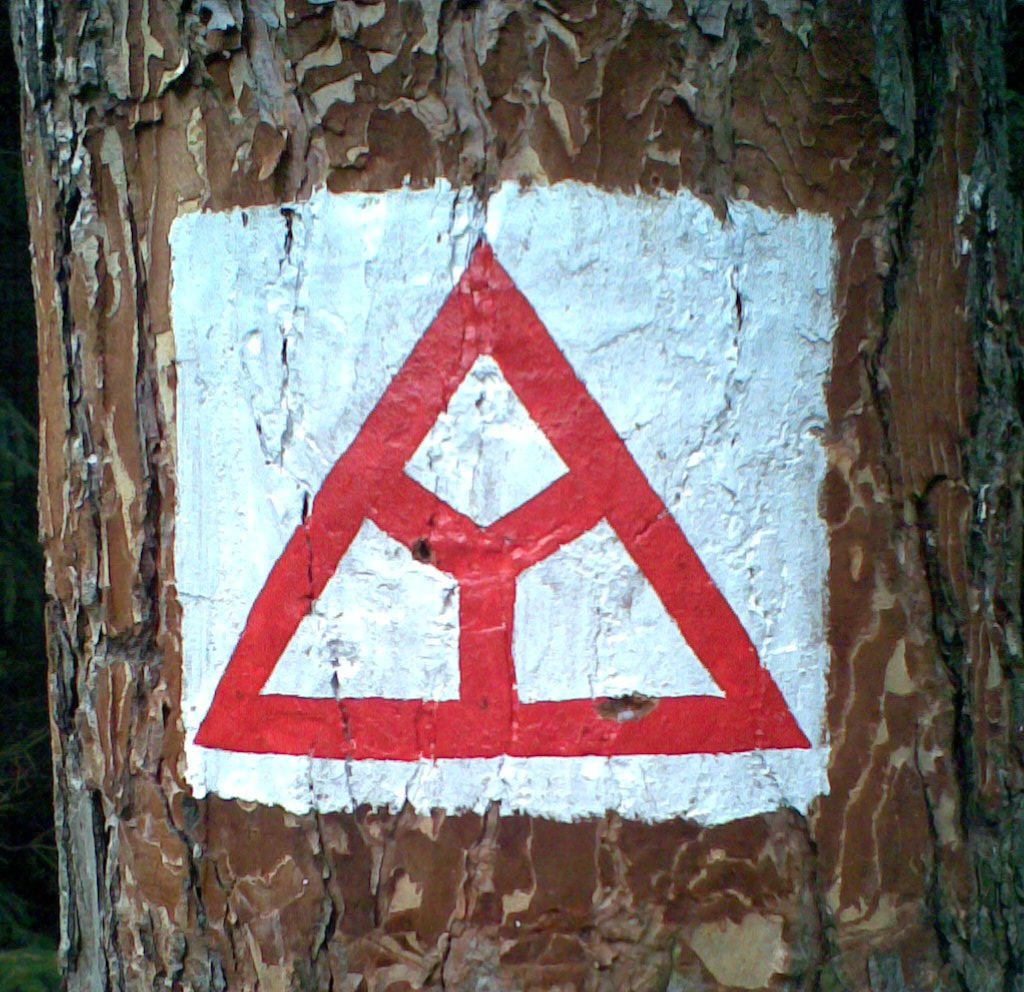
Historical marker of the Bishop's Road on Dresden Heath

The Bishop's Road goes from the Meißen Cathedral, the seat of the Bishopric of Meissen along the left bank of the Elbe in a south-easterly direction. It was mostly laid as a ridgeway road, to avoid the damp lowlands around the river Elbe. There are two possible routes as far as Klipphausen. The eastern route goes via Bockwen, Reichenbach, Reppnitz, Naustadt and Röhrsdorf to Klipphausen, the western route goes via Spittewitz, Riemsdorf, Ullendorf and Sora. From Klipphausen the road goes via Sachsdorf, Hühndorf, Brabschütz and Merbitz as far as the Dresden Basin.

In Briesnitz near Dresden the road went through a sunken lane, and forded the river Elbe.
