= Amole =

Amole may refer to:

- Amole, a common name for plants in the genera Chlorogalum and Hooveria, as well as some plants in Agave (like Agave longiflora and Agave schottii)
- Amole Gupte (born c. 1962), Indian screenwriter, actor, and director
- Doc Amole (1878–1912), American baseball player

== See also ==
- Amol (disambiguation)
