= Via Mansuerisca =

Ancient Belgian road

Map of the Via Mansuerisca

The Via Mansuerisca or Pavé Charlemagne is a paved ancient road in the High Fens in Belgium. It was discovered in 1768. The precise age of the road has been a matter of debate; a detailed study made in 2005 indicated two periods of construction: one dating from around 300 AD, and a later from sometime around the year 460 AD. The purpose of constructing the road is unknown. Parts of the road have been excavated on several occasions, the first time in 1932. The identified course of the road is approximately 6 kilometres (3.7 mi) long.

== History ==
During the late 18th century, the High Fens was a border region where the borders of five sovereign territories converged: the Duchy of Limburg, the Duchy of Luxembourg, the Duchy of Jülich, the Princely Abbey of Stavelot-Malmedy, and possessions belonging to the Prince-Bishopric of Liège. The different territories imposed different taxes and levies on goods traded over their borders, making trade in the region cumbersome and expensive. The establishment of new roads and the repair of old ones were considered a practical solution to the conundrum; by establishing roads that avoided unnecessary border crossings, tariffs could be reduced and trade increased. Authorities in the Austrian Netherlands strove to establish a new network of routes connecting the harbour in Ostend with Germany and France. While surveying the High Fens for possible routes for new roads (in a project that was eventually abandoned), the remains of an ancient paved road were discovered in 1768. The discovery was formally reported in a document dated 7 September 1768. While the authorities had been unaware of the existence of the road, it is possible that its existence had been known to the local population.

The precise age of the road has been a matter of debate. Initially it was believed to be a Roman road, but at least since the 1980s it has also been proposed that the road was instead built during the Merovingian dynasty. The latter hypothesis has been supported by some radiocarbon dating and pollen analyses, indicating a post-Roman date. Furthermore, a written record from the Merovingian period (dated 670) mentions a road called the Via Mansuerisca, noting that it marked the border of the territory of the Abbey of Stavelot-Malmedy. A detailed analysis made in 2005 indicated the road appears to have had two building periods: one dating from around 300 AD, and a later from sometime around the year 460 AD. The purpose of the construction of the road is unknown. It may have been constructed as part of a remodelled Roman defensive system during the Migration Period, or perhaps for economic reasons, facilitating the movement of goods and minerals between Trier and areas further north.

Parts of the road have been excavated by archaeologists on several occasions, the first in 1932. Following the widespread wildfires in the High Fens in summer 2026, parts of the road were exposed as covering peat and vegetation was consumed by fire.

== Description ==
The identified course of the road is approximately 6 kilometres (3.7 mi) long. It crosses the High Fens, and runs in a relatively straight line from Hestreux in the north-west to the Rasquin peat bog to the south-east, just east of Baraque Michel. It crosses the Hill stream or Helle. A detailed mapping of the course of the road was made in 1998. The local population traditionally calls the road the Pavé Charlemagne ("Charlemagne street"). Whether or not the road is actually identical with the Via Mansuerisca identified in the Merovingian document is unknown, but Via Mansuerisca has been used to refer to the road since 1871 and has become an accepted and established name for the road.

== Sources ==
- Bollinne, Pierre; Streel, Maurice (1998). "Topographie détaillée de la voie mérovingienne (la Via Mansuerisca?), enfouie dans la fagne des Wés" (PDF). Hautes Fagnes. 230 (2): 45–52.
- Dalemans, C; Streel, M (1986). "La Via Mansuerisca, enfouie dans la fagne des Wez, est mérovingienne, pas romaine" (PDF). Hautes Fagnes. 184 (4): 93–102.
- Damblon, Freddy (1994). "Les dépôts tourbeux et l'histoire de la végétation sur le plateau des Hautes-Fagnes (Belgique)". Annales de la Société géologique de Belgique. 117. Institut Royal des Sciences Naturelles de Belgique, Micropaléontologie et Paléobotanique: 259–276. ISSN 0037-9395.
- Nekrassoff, Serge (2018). Le Pavé Charlemagne. Faits & hypothèses au sujet du plus vieil itinéraire fagnard. Haute Ardenne asbl, Embarcadère du Savoir, SSHF (Université de liège).
- Streel, Maurice; Renson, Virginie; Fagel, Nathalie; Nekrassoff, Serge; De Vleeschouwer, François (2005). "La route pavée au travers des tourbières de la fagne des Wez (Via Mansuerisca?) est–elle romaine ou mérovingienne? La vérité est-elle… à mi-chemin?" (PDF). Hautes Fagnes. 259 (3): 20–24.
