= Amul (disambiguation) =

Amul is an Indian dairy cooperative.

Amul may also refer to:

- Āmul, old name of Amol, a city in Iran
- Āmul, old name of Türkmenabat, a city in Turkmenistan
- Amul, the protagonist of the 1987 game Dragon Spirit
- Amul Thapar, American jurist

== See also ==
- Amol (disambiguation)
- aMule
