= Wittmoor bog trackway =

Two historic roads in Hamburg

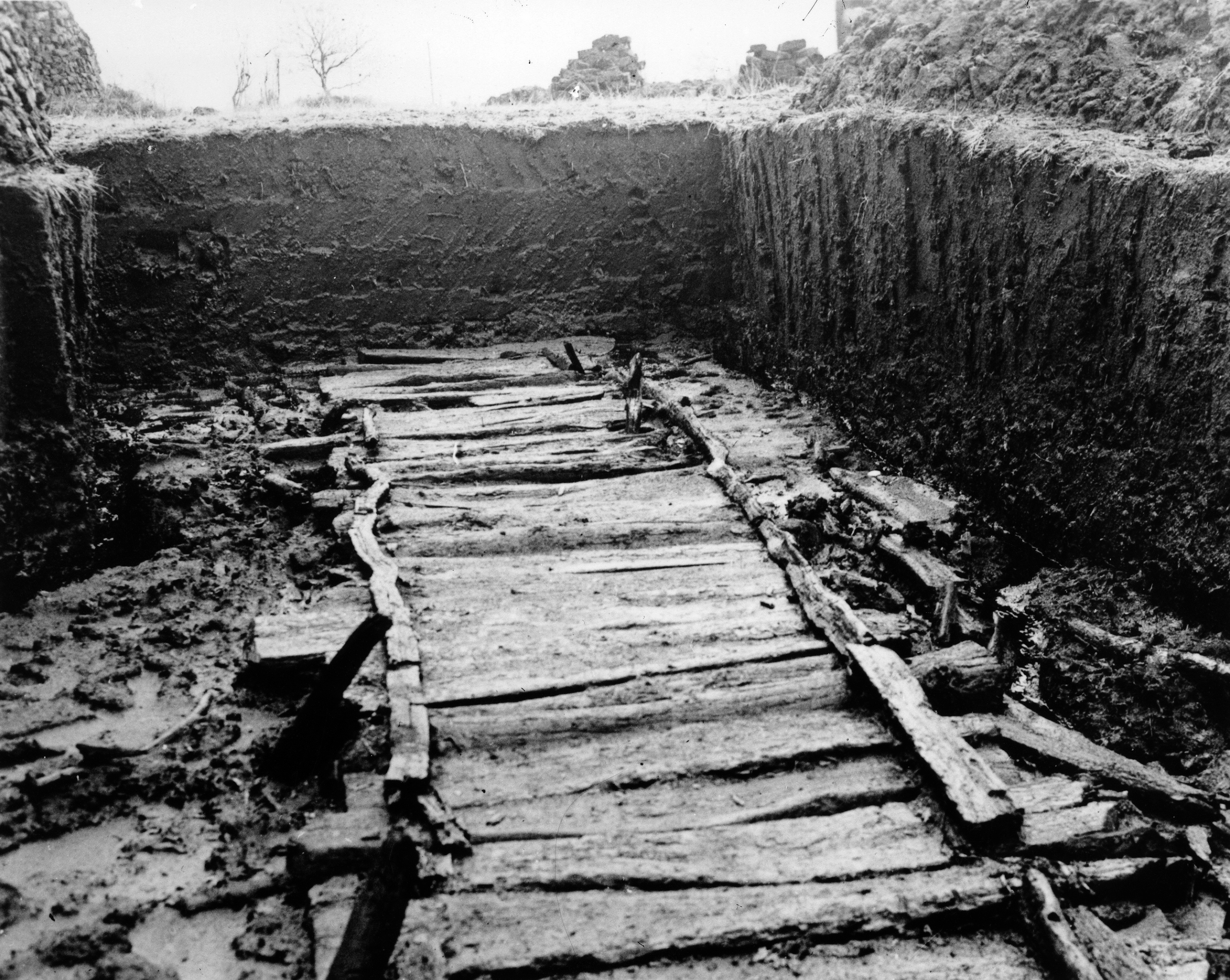
Wittmoor bog trackway. Photo made during an excavation by the Archaeological Museum Hamburg, Hamburg-Harburg, Germany.

The Wittmoor bog trackway is the name given to each of two historic corduroy roads, trackway No. I being discovered in 1898 and trackway No. II in 1904 in the Wittmoor bog in northern Hamburg, Germany. The trackways date to the 4th and 7th century AD, both linked the eastern and western shores of the formerly inaccessible, swampy bog. A part of the older trackway No. II dating to the period of the Roman Empire is on display at the permanent exhibition of the Archaeological Museum Hamburg in Harburg, Hamburg.

== Location ==
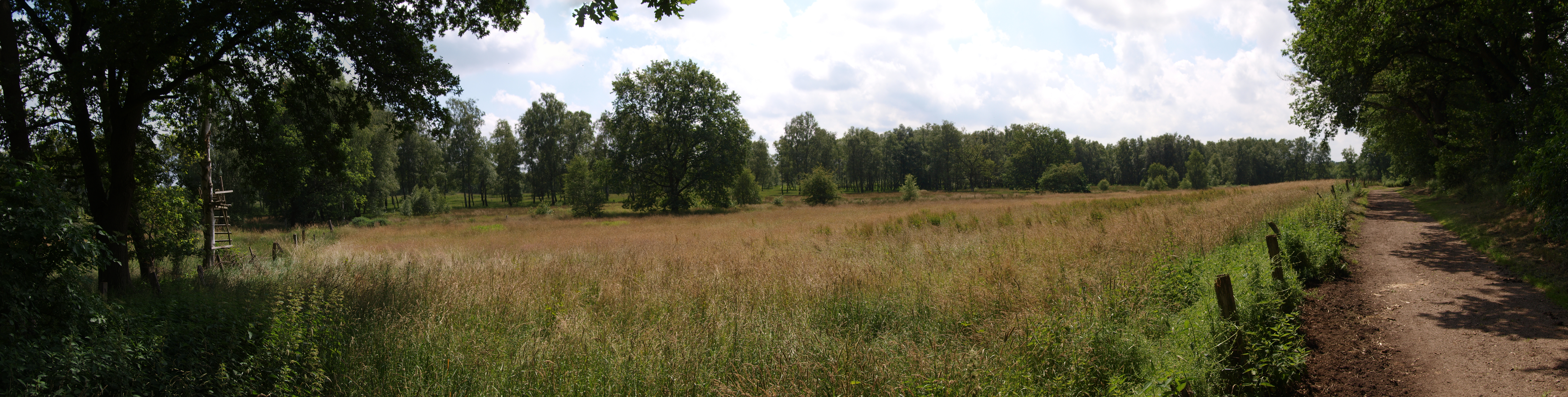
View over the western part of the Wittmoor near the former western beginning of bog trackway No. II on the left side.

Both bog trackways are located in the Wittmoor bog in the Hamburg districts of Duvenstedt, Lemsahl-Mellingstedt and the Norderstedt district of Glashütte in Schleswig-Holstein. Both trackways have been disturbed by historical peat cutters. In 1898 Ludwig Frahm, a local school teacher and historian followed a hint from Hinrich Mohr, a carpenter from Poppenbüttel, showing him the location of what he called a Russian causeway which is actually trackway No. I. In 1900 Frahm excavated a few planks of the trackway, publishing his findings in 1901 and 1913. The two bog trackways found in Wittmoor were excellently preserved due to the moist, peaty soil.

== Bog trackway No. I ==
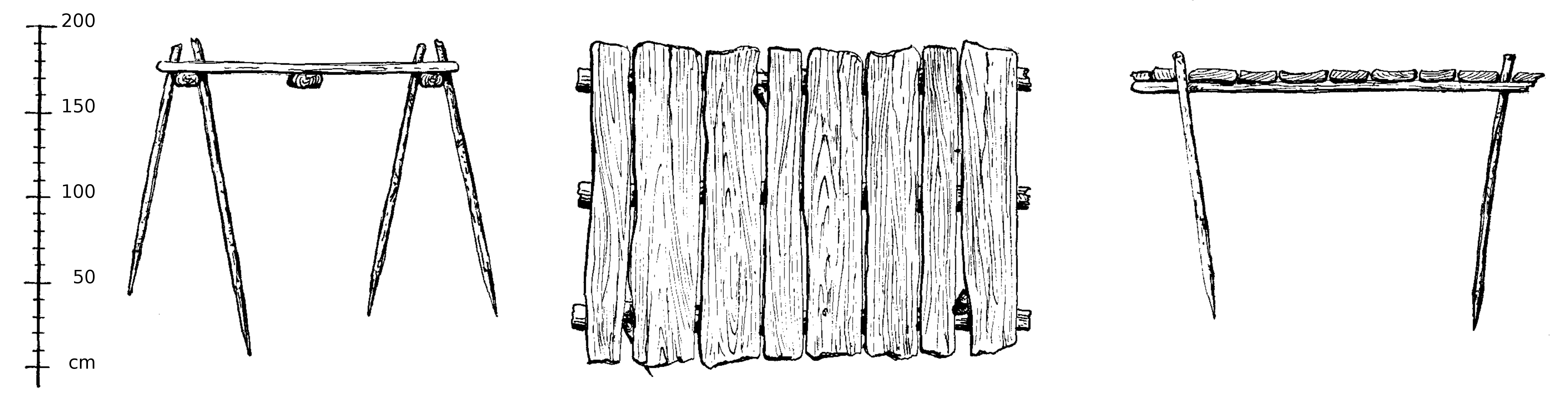
Schematic drawing of a part of the trackway No. I planks in cross-section, plan view and longitudinal section

Bog trackway I (location: 53.702829°N 10.0717169°E) was discovered in 1898, in 1900 and 1901 Frahm excavated a part of the trackway together with Prof. Wilms and it was re-examined by the archaeologists Prejawa and Kolumbe in the 1930s. The trackway ran in southeasterly direction through the Wittmoor and had a length of about 500 metres (1,600 ft). Even during World War II most of the western part of the peat bog were cut for fuel production which destroyed large sections of the trackway. This bog trackway was built up in a much easier technique than the older bog trackway II The path consisted of clean-hewn oak planks ranging from 180 centimetres (71 in) to 200 centimetres (79 in) in length and 20 centimetres (7.9 in) to 30 centimetres (12 in) width laid directly on the surface of the bog. The trackway was embedded in the peat in a depth of only 1 metre (3.3 ft) from below the surface. Also in this part of the bog peat was regularly taken for fuel production, which gradually destroyed the trackway. The well-preserved wooden planks of the way were taken by the peat cutters and used as firewood.

== Bog trackway No. II ==
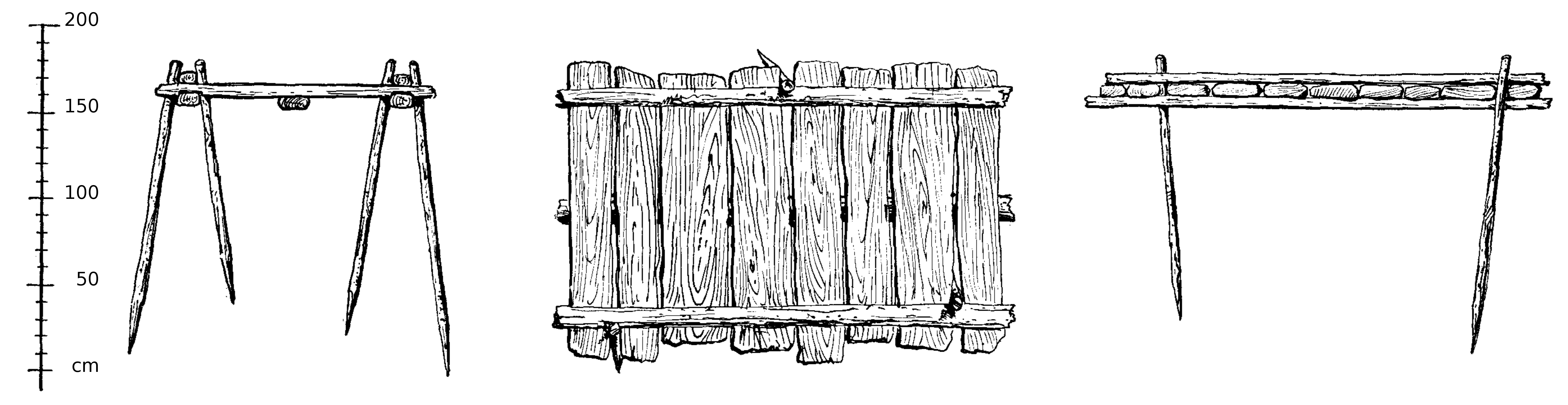
Schematic drawing of a part of trackway No. II cross section, plan view and longitudinal section

Bog trackway No. II (location: 53.699984°N 10.069399°E) was discovered in 1904 by Hamburg state geologist Dr. Wolff. It too runs in a southeasterly direction through the Wittmoor, and had a length of about 600 metres (2,000 ft) and was located parallel to and c. 500 metres (1,600 ft) south-southwest of trackway No. I. This path was gradually destroyed through regular peat cutting. In 1947 approximately 2 metres (6.6 ft) of the central part was excavated by Kellermann in 1947 which is now on displayed in the permanent collection of the Archaeological Museum in Hamburg. The substructure of the road consisted of two split oak planks that were placed parallel to each other on a sand or gravel foundation on the formerly swampy terrain. The thresholds were piles of split oak boards ranging from about 130 centimetres (51 in) to 160 centimetres (63 in) in length, widths between 25 centimetres (9.8 in) and 45 centimetres (18 in) and thickness of 2 centimetres (0.79 in) to 6 centimetres (2.4 in) laid transverse to the direction of the path. The thresholds were notched so as to prevent slipping on the boards. Every second threshold was cut diagonally at the ends. Through the gaps birch poles were driven into the ground to prevent slipping of the thresholds. A large part of the excavated path resembled a building site, the woods were torn out of the path way and thrown together in one place. Beside it newly trimmed timbers were found which were designed to be built in the new way, as well as items interpreted as tools, like a crowbar and mallet. Charred small pieces of wood indicating a fireplace. In 1938 the bog trackway was initially dated by pollen analysis to the 6th century BC; however, a radiocarbon dating performed in 1957 yielded an age nearer the beginning of the Christian era. The most recent dendrochronological dating performed in 1996 yielded a felling date of the trees around the 330 AD

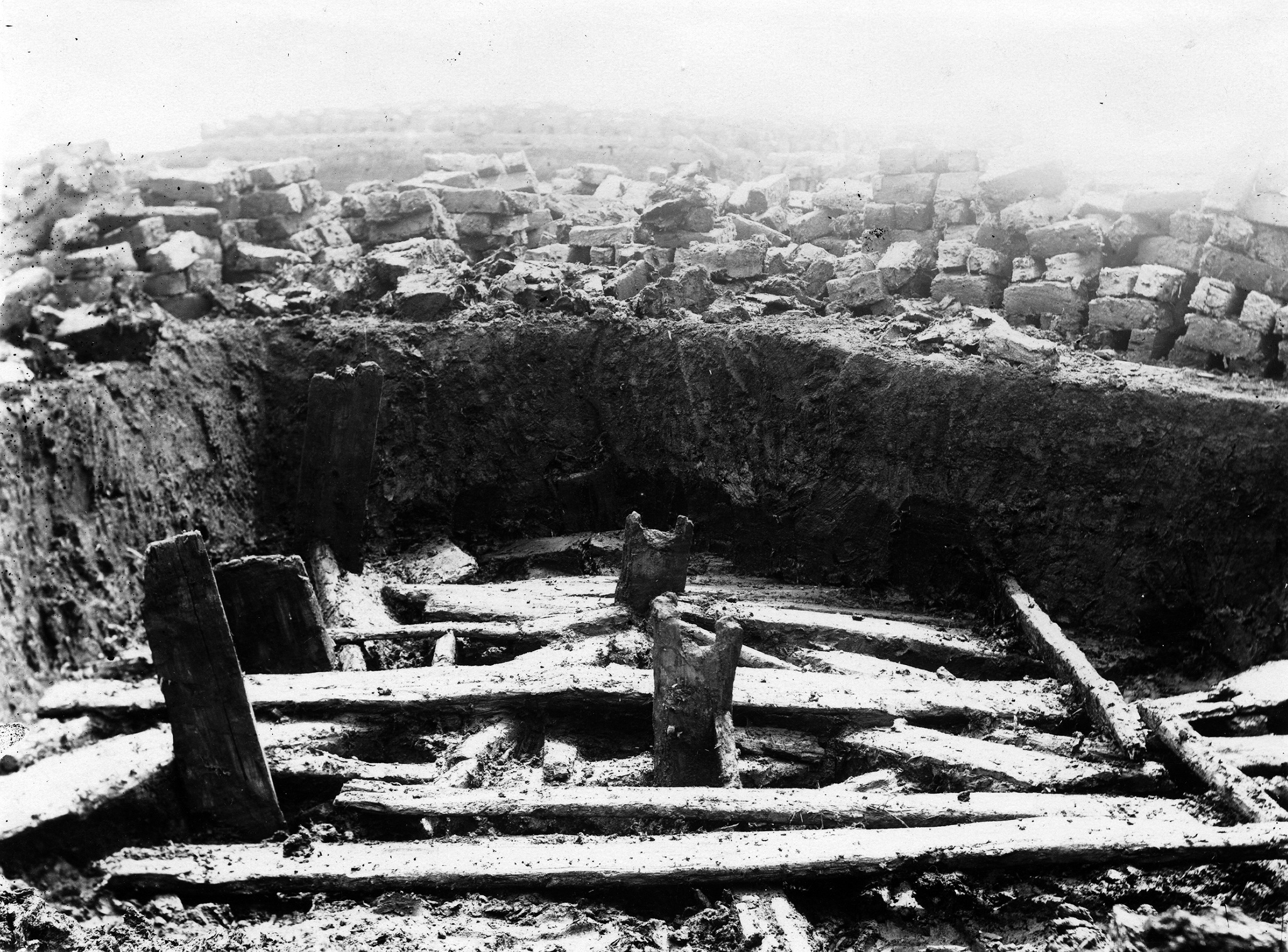
Excavation situation in the 1930s

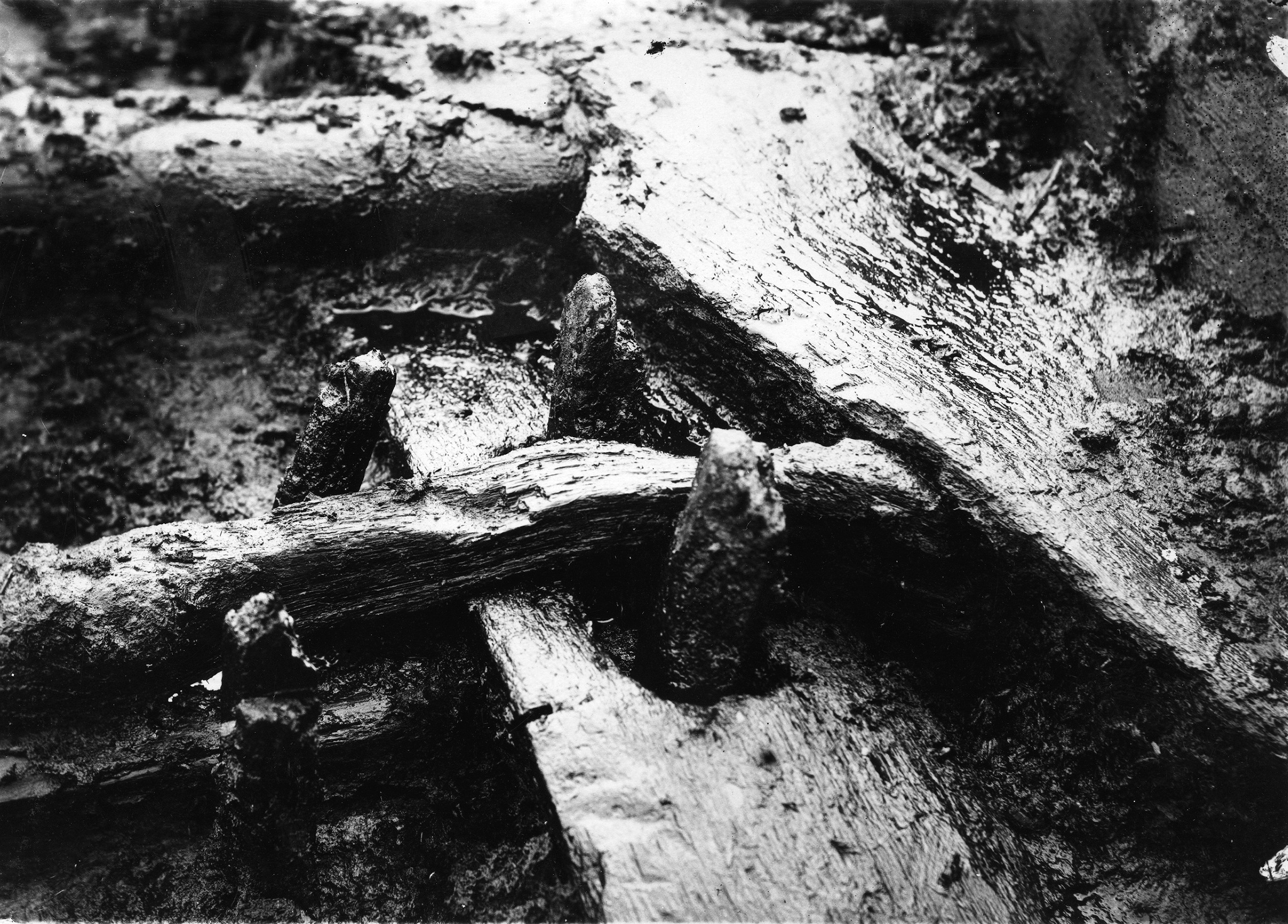
Detail of the pile displacement II in the 1930s

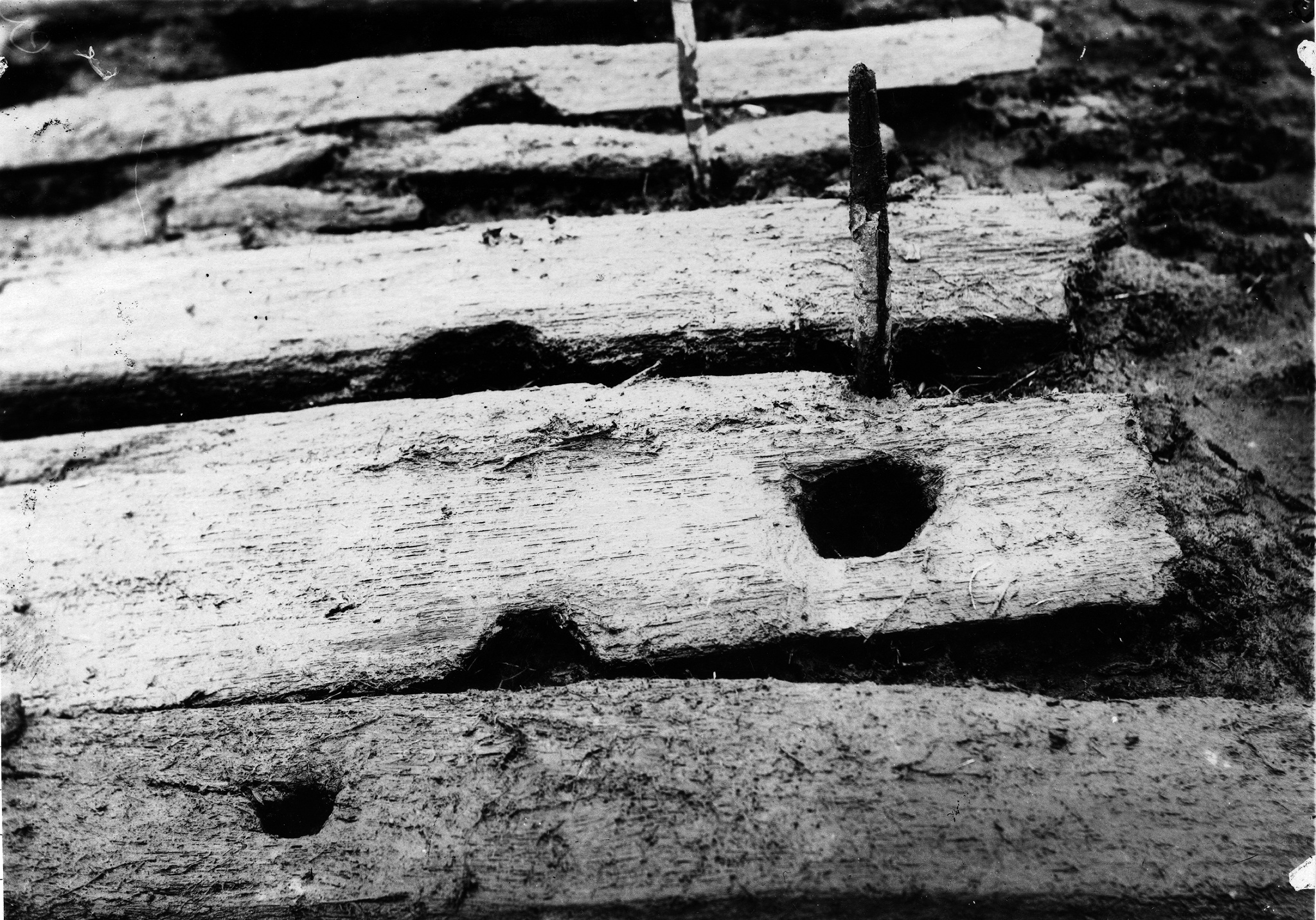
Mortise in a threshold in the 1930s

== Interpretation ==
The discovery of the two bog trackways disproved the old doctrine that such bog trackways only occurred south of the river Elbe. They show that in earlier times, a lively exchange between the western and eastern shores of the marshland occurred, and that the routes were considered so important that a significant logistical and substantive effort was expended to build paths through the marsh rather than circumvent the area. No archaeological evidence for settlements have been detected belonging to the bog trackways.
