= Amol Jichkar =

Indian cricketer (1978–2017)

Personal information
- Full name: Amol Manohar Jichkar
- Born: 16 August 1978
- Died: 25 April 2017 (aged 38)
- Source: ESPNcricinfo, 30 April 2021

Amol Manohar Jichkar (16 August 1978 – 25 April 2017) was an Indian cricketer. He played in six first-class and eight List A matches for Vidarbha from 1998/99 to 2001/02. He committed suicide by hanging himself. He was 38 years old.

== See also ==
- List of Vidarbha cricketers
