= Ancient road in Tarsus =

Ancient Roman road in modern-day Turkey

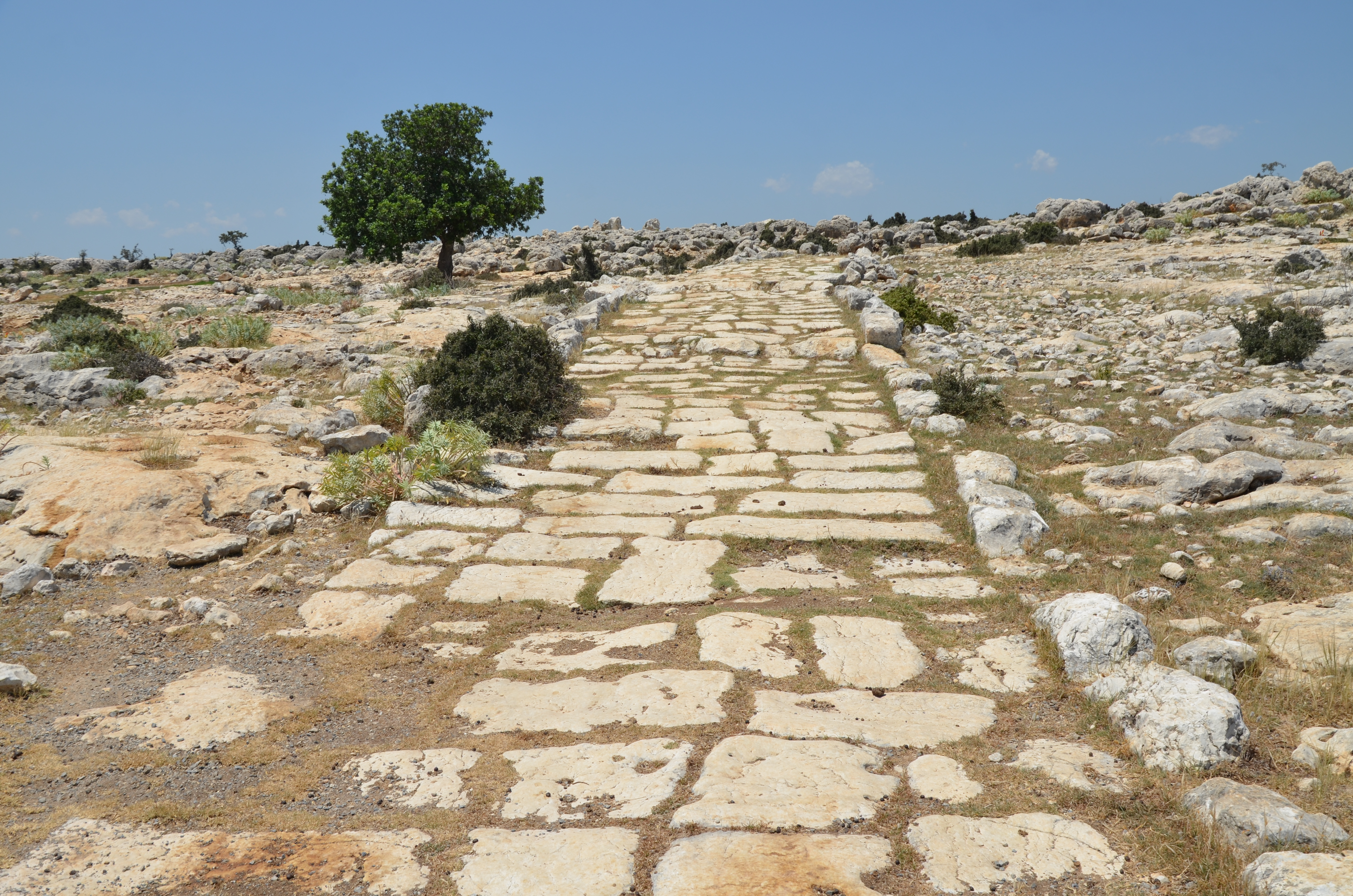

Ancient road (Turkish: Antik yol) at (36°55′04″N 34°53′33″E extending to 36°55′02″N 34°53′35″E) is the unearthed section of an ancient road in the historical city of Tarsus, Turkey.

Tarsus, an ancient city known as the birthplace of Paul the Apostle, is a major district center in Mersin Province, Turkey. The road was accidentally unearthed in a construction pit in 1993. The construction was abandoned and the road is now surrounded by mesh wire panel for protection.

The width of the road is 6.5 metres (21 ft) The construction material is basalt stone and underneath the road a sewage system had been laid down which makes the road unique among the other Anatolian roads of the era. On the west and east of the road there are stylobates.
