= Dinesh Mirkar =

Indian cricketer

Dinesh Mirkar was an Indian cricketer who played for Vidarbha.

Mirkar made a single first-class appearance for the team, during the 1957-58 Ranji Trophy competition, against Madhya Pradesh. From the upper-middle order, he scored 10 runs in the first innings in which he batted and 3 runs in the second. He took figures of 0-7 from 3 overs with the ball.
