= Amol Ratan Balwadkar =

Social worker & politician

Chairman of the city improvement committee PMC
- Incumbent
- Assumed office 4 May 2019
- Constituency: Baner-Balewadi-Pashan-Sutarwadi-Panchvati

Personal details
- Born: Amol Ratan Balwadkar; 17 February 1987 (age 39) Pune, Maharashtra, India
- Profession: Social worker, politician
- Website: www.amolbalwadkar.in

Amol Ratan Balwadkar is a social worker and ex-corporator in Pune Municipal Corporation from Baner-Balewadi ward of Pune as a member of Bharatiya Janata Party. In March 2017, he won the corporation election. He is also general secretary of Bhartiya Janata Party Yuva Morcha Pune city.
