= Rahul Chikhalkar =

Indian cricketer

Rahul Chikhalkar (born 5 November 1983) is an Indian cricketer. He is a right-handed batsman and right-arm medium-pace bowler who plays for Vidarbha. He was born in Amravati.

Chikhalkar made his cricketing debut for Vidarbha's Under-22s team during the 2003–04 season, though, following these appearances, he was not to make another appearance in a cricket match until 2008–09.

Chikhalkar made his first-class debut for Vidarbha against Services in November 2008. He scored 3 runs in the first innings and 2 runs in the second, the latter innings seeing Faid Fazal score an unbeaten double-century.
