= Anilkumar Abhayankar =

Indian cricketer (1939–2016)

Personal information
- Full name: Anilkumar Nilkanth Abhayankar
- Born: 1 April 1939; Nagpur, British India
- Died: 15 March 2016 (aged 76); Nagpur, India
- Batting: Right-handed
- Bowling: Right-arm medium

Domestic team information
- Years: Team
- 1958-59 to 1960-61: Vidarbha

Career statistics
| Competition | First-class |
|---|---|
| Matches | 5 |
| Runs scored | 134 |
| Batting average | 19.14 |
| 100s/50s | 0/1 |
| Top score | 51 |
| Balls bowled | 108 |
| Wickets | 3 |
| Bowling average | 23 |
| 5 wickets in innings | 0 |
| 10 wickets in match | 0 |
| Best bowling | 2/9 |
| Catches/stumpings | 1/0 |
- Source: , 12 March 2017

Anilkumar Abhayankar, also spelled Abhyankar, (1 April 1939 – 15 March 2016) was an Indian cricketer who played first-class cricket for Vidarbha in 1959 and 1960.

His two highest scores in first-class cricket came in Vidarbha's match against Rajasthan in the Ranji Trophy in 1959-60 when, batting at number five, he scored 43 and 51. In 1960-61 he played in the Rohinton Baria Trophy representing Nagpur University.
