= R. N. Abhyankar =

Indian cricketer

Personal information
- Full name: R. N. Abhyankar

Domestic team information
- Years: Team
- 1961/62–1967/68: Vidarbha

Career statistics
Competition	FC
Matches	15
Runs scored	467
Batting average	18.68
100s/50s	0/1
Top score	73
Balls bowled	431
Wickets	10
Bowling average	27.40
5 wickets in innings	0
10 wickets in match	0
Best bowling	3/47
Catches/stumpings	5/0
- Source: ESPN Cricinfo, 12 March 2017

R. N. Abhyankar was an Indian first-class cricketer active 1961–1968 who played for Vidarbha. He made 15 appearances, scoring 467 runs with a highest score of 73, and took ten wickets with a best innings return of three for 47.
