= List of medieval roads in Romania =

This is a list of medieval roads in Romania, roads that were in used as trade routes during the Middle Ages in the territory of today's Romania.

- Drumul meiului/mălaiului - Millet Road (1583), Oltenia
- Drumul porcilor Pig Road (1584)
- Drumul lemnelor (16th century)
- Drumul Bucureștilor (16th century)
- Drumul Dîrstorului (16th century)
- Drumul Bărăganului (16th century)
- Drumul Mehedinților (1556)
- Drumul Teleajenului (1476)
- Drumul Branului (1476)
- Drumul Prahovei (1476)
- Drumul Teleajenului / Drumul Buților (1476) Brașov - Buzoel - Tabla Buţii - Vălenii de Munte - Bucov
  - Calea Zizinului: Brașov - Întorsura Buzăului
  - Calea Teliului: Brașov - Întorsura Buzăului
- Drumul Buzăului (1476)
- Drumul Bogdanului (14th century): Poland - Suceava - Bacău - Adjudul Vechi - Buzău - Târgovişte/Bucharest
