= Baburao Yadav =

Indian cricketer (born 1982)

Personal information
- Full name: Baburao Algu Yadav
- Born: 6 November 1982 (age 44); Chandrapur, Maharashtra
- Batting: Right-handed
- Bowling: Right-arm medium
- Role: All-rounder

Domestic team information
- Years: Team
- 2001-2006: Vidarbha
- 2006/07: Railways cricket team
- 2007/08: Hyderabad Heroes
- 2007/08-2008/09: Ahmedabad Rockets
- Source: ESPNcricinfo, 18 May 2016

Baburao Algu Yadav (born 6 November 1982) is an Indian cricketer who plays for Vidarbha cricket team and Railways cricket team and for Ahmedabad Rockets and Hyderabad Heroes in Indian Cricket League . He is right-hand batsman who can bowl right-arm medium pace. He was born at Chandrapur.
