= List of Assam cricketers =

This is a list of cricketers who have played first-class, List A or Twenty20 cricket for Assam cricket team. Seasons given are first and last seasons; the player did not necessarily play in all the intervening seasons. Players in bold have played international cricket.

== A ==
- Abu Nechim, 2005/06
- Amzad Ali, 2007/08
- Arun Karthik, 2014/15-2016/17
- Jagadeesh Arunkumar, 2005/06-2006/07
- Rajjakuddin Ahmed, 2017/18
- Roshan Alam, 2011/12
- Zahir Alam, 1988/89-1994/95
- Parvez Aziz, 2004/05

== B ==
- Sekhar Barman, 2017/18
- Bichitra Baruah, 2006/07-2007
- S. Barua, 1969/70
- Hemanga Baruah, 1984/85-1991/92
- Kalyan Baruah, 1963/64 – 1966/67
- Kaustav Baruah, 1990/91 – 1993/94
- Madhurya Barua, 1954/55-1972/73
- Tapan Barua, 1956/57-1965/66
- Hari Prasad Bezbarua, 1965/66 – 1972/73
- Nandan Bezbarua, 1966/67-1979/80
- Prakash Bhagat, 2010/11
- Anshuman Bhagawati, 1994/95-1998/99
- Manoj Bhagawati, 1988/89
- Saurav Bhagawati, 2002/03-2006/07
- Bimal Bharali, 1969/70-1981/82
- Sunil Bhattacharjee, 1958/59-1972/73
- Jogeswar Bhumij, 2015/16
- Naba Bhuyan, 1948/49
- Deep Bora, 1993/94 – 1997/98
- Umananda Bora, 1983/84
- Paramesh Borah, 1984/85 – 1986/87
- Rajesh Borah, 1983/84-2000/01
- Nishanta Bordoloi, 1994/95-2007/08
- Peter Bullock, 1948/49-1951/52

== C ==
- Satya Gopal Chakraborty, 1982/83 – 1996/97
- Rupam Baruah, 2022
- Debajit Chetia, 1987/88
- Bikash Chetri, 2015/16
- Rajdeep dutta, 2008

== D ==
- Amal Das, 1972/73 – 1991/92
- Amlanjyoti Das, 2019/20
- Arup Das, 2011/12
- Bipul Das, 1985/86
- Deepak Das, 1988/89 – 1993/94
- Denish Das, 2020/21
- Ganesh Chandra Das, 1952/53-1984/85
- Gautam Das, 1978/79 – 1982/83
- Kamal Das, 1975/76 – 1986/87
- Krishna Das, 2005/06
- Mukut Das, 1975/76 – 1985/86
- Palash Jyoti Das, 2001/02 – 2007/08
- Pallavkumar Das, 2011/12
- Parag Das, 1993/94 – 2008/09
- Pritam Das, 2007/08
- Rajdeep Das, 2007/08
- Rajkumar Das, 1987/88 – 1989/90
- Rishav Das, 2013/14
- Sauvik Das, 2002/03 – 2007/08
- Sumit Ranjan Das, 1996/97 – 2002/03
- Pritam Debnath, 2008/09
- Gautam Dutta, 1989/90 – 2004/05
- Mrinmoy Dutta, 2016/17
- Pabitra Dutta, 1987/88-1997/98
- Sumit Dutta, 1981/82 – 1988/89

== E ==
- Gerald Eastmure

== G ==
- Anup Ghatak, 1963/64-1977/78
- Subhadeep Ghosh, 1994/95-2004/05
- Abhilash Gogoi, 2019/20
- Dhiraj Goswami, 2002/03
- Deepak Gohain, 2011/12
- Rajkumar Mritunjoy Gohain, 2001/02-2004

== H ==
- Abani Hazarika, 1950/51-1971/72
- Gautam Hazarika, 1983/84 – 1985/86
- Probir Hazarika, 1969/70 – 1983/84
- Rahul Hazarika, 2015/16
- Anwar Hussain, 1965/66 – 1973/74
- Sajjad Hussain, 2000/01-2004/05
- Mukhtar Hussain, 2017/18

== I ==
- Mark Ingty, 2001/02-2005/06

== J ==
- Dheeraj Jadhav, 2008/09-2013/14
- Saahil Jain, 2019/20

== K ==
- Munna Kakoti, 1975/76-1992/93
- Arun Kalita, 1984/85 – 1987/88
- Jitumoni Kalita, 2017/18
- Mukut Kalita, 2007
- Prafulla Kalita, 1982/83 – 1985/86
- Rupert Kettle, 1948/49 – 1950/51
- Badruddin Khan
- Nasir Gul Khan, 1994/95-1996/97
- Rajat Khan, 2017/18
- Arlen Konwar, 2001/02
- Naba Konwar, 1980/81-1989/90
- GN Kunjru, 1966/67

== L ==
- Sunil Lachit, 2022

== M ==
- Baburam Magor, 1998/99-2002/03
- Bitop Mahanta, 2007/08
- B. Maitra, 1966/67
- Biswajit Majumdar, 1983/84-1994/95
- Ranjeet Mali, 2008/09
- Subham Mandal, 2019/20
- Syed Mohammed, 2012/13-2016/17
- Parvej Musaraf, 2023/24

== N ==
- Sumit Nag, 1983/84
- Samarjit Nath, 2001/02
- Samarjit Neogi, 1989/90

== P ==
- Riyan Parag, 2016/17
- Pradeep Phukhan, 1957/58 – 1963/64
- R. Puri, 1949/50
- Swarupam Purkayastha, 2008/09

== R ==
- Aswani Rajbanshi, 1954/55-1964/65
- Avasarala Rao, 1987/88
- Chandan Rawat, 2004/05-2011
- Amalendu Guha Roy, 1948/49 – 1963/64
- Avijit Singha Roy, 2009/10
- Sibsankar Roy, 2008/09
- Wasiqur Rahman, 2015/16

== S ==
- Dhrubajyoti Sabhapandit, 1974/75 – 1982/83
- Naren Sabhapandit, 1966/67 – 1980/81
- Biplab Saikia, 2018/19
- Devajit Saikia, 1990/91
- Khanin Saikia, 2002/03-2002/03
- Kunal Saikia, 2006/07
- Pankaj Saikia, 2008
- Mohan Saikia, 1974/75 – 1984/85
- Subhrajit Saikia, 1993/94-2001/02
- A. Sarma, 1955/56
- Sidharth Sarmah, 2019/20
- Akash Sengupta, 2021/22
- Gokul Sharma, 2004/05
- Nagesh Singh, 1977/78-1981/82
- Rahul Singh, 2017/18
- Rajinder Singh, 1988/89-1998/99
- Tarjinder Singh, 2005/06
- Amit Sinha, 2007/08
- Prasanta Sonowal, 2011/12

== T ==
- Mrigen Talukdar, 2002/03-2006/07
- Hrishikesh Tamuli, 2018/19
- Pankaj Tamuli, 2002/03
- Sujay Tarafdar, 2006/07
- Badal Thakur, 1952/53 – 1965/66
- Abhishek Thakuri, 2017/18

== U ==
- Sushil Uzir, 1975/76 – 1987/88
- Ujjwal Bikash Kashyap (2004–2007) Rangia

== Y ==
- Raj Yadav, 2003/04-2006/07

== Z ==
- Javed Zaman, 1993/94-2004/05
- Zakaria Zuffri, 1982/83-2007/08
