= List of East Zone cricketers =

This is a list of all cricketers who have played first-class or List A cricket for East Zone cricket team.

Last updated at the end of the 2015/16 season.

== A–F ==
- B R Rao
- Varun Aaron
- Shahbaz Ahmed
- Zahir Alam
- Bellipadi Sridhar Alva
- Pravin Amre
- J. Arunkumar
- Parvez Aziz
- Balendu Shah
- Malay Banerjee
- Rabi Banerjee
- Sambaran Banerjee
- Montu Banerjee
- Shute Banerjee
- Sunil Banerjee
- Subroto Banerjee
- Tapan Banerjee
- Uday Banerjee
- Ajay Barik
- Madhurya Barua
- Tapan Barua
- Natraj Behera
- Niranjan Behera
- Prakash Bhandari
- Narsimh Bhandari
- Bimal Bharali
- Anil Bhardwaj
- Ramesh Bhatia
- Aloke Bhattacharjee
- Anil Bhattacharjee
- Sunil Bhattacharjee
- Arup Bhattacharya
- Ranjib Biswal
- Nripesh Biswas
- Rajesh Borah
- Bimal Bose
- Gopal Bose
- Kartick Bose
- Pannalal Bose
- Ranadeb Bose
- Sivaji Bose
- Barun Burman
- Samir Chakrabarti
- Dibyendu Chakrabarty
- Gopal Chakraborty
- Kanu Chakravarthy
- Timir Chanda
- Chatrapalsinhji
- Anirban Chatterjee
- Nirmal Chatterjee
- Premangsu Chatterjee
- Sudip Chatterjee
- Utpal Chatterjee
- Govind Chauhan
- Nirode Chowdhury
- Denis Compton
- Daljit Singh
- Daljit Singh
- Michael Dalvi
- Amal Das
- Ajoy Das
- Arindam Das
- Halhadar Das
- Kajal Das
- Kamal Das
- Krishna Das
- Mintoo Das
- Palash Jyoti Das
- Pallavkumar Das
- Parag Das
- Shiv Sunder Das
- Subhomoy Das
- Subroto Das
- Sudhir Das
- Sritam Das
- Deep Dasgupta
- Sourav Dasgupta
- Punya Datta
- Rana Dutta
- Kumar Deobrat
- Rajeev Deora
- Chiranjib Dey
- Dhananjay Singh
- Mahendra Singh Dhoni
- Ashok Dinda
- Mihir Diwakar
- Dilip Doshi
- Karun Dubey
- Gautam Dutta
- Tapan Dutta
- Farsatullah
- Benjamin Frank

== G–L ==
- Hiralal Gaekwad
- Devang Gandhi
- Ashok Gandotra
- Snehasish Ganguly
- Sourav Ganguly
- Shiv Gautam
- Rohan Gavaskar
- Anup Ghatak
- Ashok Ghosh
- Biren Ghosh
- Gour Ghosh
- Jiban Ghosh
- Probal Ghosh
- Prasanta Ghosh
- Shanti Ghoshal
- Hari Gidwani
- S. K. Girdhari
- Baldev Gossain
- Chuni Goswami
- Dhiraj Goswami
- Shreevats Goswami
- Subrata Guha
- Surup Guha Thakurta
- Sunny Gupta
- Vinod Gupta
- Nikhil Haldipur
- Abani Hazarika
- Probir Hazarika
- Narendra Hirwani
- Adil Hussain
- Mukhtar Hussain
- Mark Ingty
- Dheeraj Jadhav
- Madhavsinh Jagdale
- Ishank Jaggi
- Asjit Jaiprakasham
- Pinninti Jayachandra
- Rusi Jeejeebhoy
- Bisuddh Jena
- Abhishek Jhunjhunwala
- Jodh Singh
- Mayur Kadrekar
- Munna Kakoti
- Shrikant Kalyani
- Sushil Kapoor
- Saba Karim
- Anand Katti
- Ramnath Kenny
- Iqbal Khan
- Shahid Khan
- Shahid Khan
- Vinod Khullar
- Lester King
- Arlen Konwar
- Yajuvendra Krishanatry
- Avinash Kumar
- Rajiv Kumar
- Sunil Kumar
- Tarun Kumar
- Soumendranath Kundu
- Gyiani Kunzru
- Alokendru Lahiri
- Saurasish Lahiri
- Arun Lal
- Jagdish Lal
- Raymond Lewis

== M–R ==
- Devashish Mahanti
- Anustup Majumdar
- Wrichik Majumder
- Ashok Malhotra
- Alok Mangaraj
- Deepak Mangaraj
- Vinoo Mankad
- S. S. Misra
- Abhik Mitra
- Shyam Mitra
- Kalyan Mitter
- Basant Mohanty
- Debasis Mohanty
- Rakesh Mohanty
- Biswa Mohapatra
- Prasanta Mohapatra
- Sourajit Mohapatra
- B. Moitra
- Robin Morris
- Dattatreya Mukherjee
- Deb Mukherjee
- Durga Mukherjee
- Joydeep Mukherjee
- Priyankar Mukherjee
- Raja Mukherjee
- Raju Mukherjee
- Robin Mukherjee
- Saradindu Mukherjee
- Pravanjan Mullick
- Shahbaz Nadeem
- Nagesh Singh
- Arnab Nandi
- Palash Nandy
- Pranob Nandy
- C. K. Nayudu
- C. S. Nayudu
- Abu Nechim
- Rameez Nemat
- B. B. Nimbalkar
- Narayan Nivsarkar
- Sandir Om Prakash
- Phiroze Palia
- Rabi Panda
- Sumit Panda
- Pradeep Pandey
- Chandrakant Pandit
- Riyan Parag
- Paramjit Singh
- Rashmi Parida
- Lalitendu Parija
- T. V. Parthasarathi
- Mandayam Parthasarathy
- Arun Patel
- Paresh Patel
- Sudhir Pathak
- Bikas Pati
- Banabasi Patnaik
- Shib Paul
- J. P. Phansalkar
- Prakash Poddar
- Govinda Podder
- Subroto Porel
- Kiran Powar
- Harmohan Praharaj
- Sushil Kumar Prasad
- Samar Quadri
- Vijay Rajindernath
- Rajinder Singh
- Rajinder Singh
- Lalchand Rajput
- Randhir Singh
- K. V. P. Rao
- Shankar Rao
- Sanjay Raul
- Amiya Ray
- Amitava Roy
- Ambar Roy
- Indu Roy
- Nemailal Roy
- Pankaj Roy
- Pranab Roy
- Sandip Roy
- Sibsankar Roy

== S–Z ==
- Tushar Saha
- Wriddhiman Saha
- Alok Sahoo
- Somnath Sahoo
- Subhrajit Saikia
- Vinayak Samant
- Biplab Samantray
- Sushil Sanghvi
- Rajen Sanyal
- Sanjib Sanyal
- Souren Sanyal
- Vasanth Saravanan
- Arindam Sarkar
- Dipankar Sarkar
- Chandu Sarwate
- Rajagopal Sathish
- Sanjay Satpathy
- Sanjay Kumar Satpathy
- Santanu Satpathy
- Satyendra Singh
- Iresh Saxena
- Ramesh Saxena
- Probir Sen
- Sagarmoy Sensharma
- Mohammed Shami
- Chetan Sharma
- Deepak Sharma
- Gokul Sharma
- Shibsagar Singh
- Gautam Shome
- Gautam Kumar Shome
- Anand Shukla
- Lakshmi Ratan Shukla
- Rahul Shukla
- Rakesh Shukla
- R. Sikdar
- Akilesh Sinha
- Ashis Sinha
- Sanjeev Sinha
- Sekhar Sinha
- Venkataraman Sivaramakrishnan
- Sukhvinder Singh
- Nyayapathy Swamy
- Tariq-ur-Rehman
- Tarjinder Singh
- G. Tilak Raj
- Manoj Tiwary
- Saurabh Tiwary
- Prashant Vaidya
- Manish Vardhan
- Veer Pratap Singh
- V. Venkatram
- Raja Venkatraman
- Akash Verma
- Virat Singh
- Wahidullah
- Javed Zaman
- Zakaria Zuffri
