= List of Assam first-class cricket records =

This is a list of Assam first-class cricket records, with each list containing the top five performances in the category.

Currently active players are bolded.

== Team records ==
=== Highest innings totals ===
Rank	Score	Opponent	Season
1	684/7 dec	Tripura	1991/92
2	649/9 dec	Bihar	1991/92
3	588/6	Bengal	2010/11
4	537/9 dec	Hyderabad	2003/04
5	525/5 dec	Tripura	2013/14
Source: CricketArchive. Last updated: 19 October 2016.

=== Lowest innings totals ===
Rank	Score	Opponent	Season
1	32	Bihar	1971/72
2	33	Bengal	1974/75
3	35	Bengal	1974/75
4	46	Bihar	1970/71
5	50	Holkar	1949/50
Source: CricketArchive. Last updated: 19 October 2016.

=== Largest margins of innings victory ===
Rank	Margin	Opponent	Season
1	inns & 472 runs	Tripura	1991/92
2	inns & 327 runs	Tripura	1996/97
3	inns & 188 runs	Tripura	1995/96
4	inns & 177 runs	Goa	2006/07
5	inns & 152 runs	Rajasthan	2015/16
Source: CricketArchive. Last updated: 19 October 2016.

=== Largest margins of runs victory ===
Rank	Margin	Opponent	Season
1	363 runs	Tripura	1990/91
2	234 runs	Tripura	1994/95
3	103 runs	Orissa	1951/52
4	71 runs	Vidarbha	2008/09
5	53 runs	Jharkhand	2012/13
Source: CricketArchive. Last updated: 19 October 2016.

== Batting records ==
=== Highest individual scores ===
Rank	Score	Player	Opponent	Season
1	257	Zahir Alam	Tripura	1991/92
2	243	Dheeraj Jadhav	Tripura	2012/13
3	239	Lalchand Rajput	Tripura	1991/92
4	235	Rajesh Borah	Bihar	1991/92
5	229	Surjuram Girdhari	Orissa	1957/58
Source: CricketArchive. Last updated: 19 October 2016.

== Bowling records ==
=== Best innings bowling ===
Rank	Score	Player	Opponent	Season
1	9/52	Gautam Dutta	Tripura	1991/92
2	8/23	Gautam Dutta	Tripura	1999/00
3	8/29	Swarupam Purkayastha	Hyderabad	2014/15
4	8/63	Munna Kakoti	Tripura	1987/88
5	8/83	Arup Das	Punjab	2015/16
Source: CricketArchive. Last updated: 19 October 2016.

=== Best match bowling ===
Rank	Score	Player	Opponent	Season
1	14/96	Gautam Dutta	Vidarbha	1991/92
2	15/38	Naba Konwar	Hyderabad	1986/87
3	13/78	Aswani Rajbanshi	Tripura	1960/61
4	13/88	Swarupam Purkayastha	Vidarbha	2014/15
Source: CricketArchive. Last updated: 19 October 2016.

=== Hat-trick ===
Player	Opponent	Season
Abu Nechim	Goa	2011/12
Source: CricketArchive. Last updated: 19 October 2016.

== Notes ==
All lists are referenced to CricketArchive.

== See also ==
- Assam cricket team
- List of Assam List A cricket records
