= 2009–10 Ranji Trophy =

- The Ranji trophy, which the winners get.
- Administrator: BCCI
- Cricket format: First-class cricket
- Tournament format: Round-robin then knockout
- Champions: Mumbai (39th title)
- Participants: 27
- Most runs: Manish Pandey (882) (Karnataka)
- Most wickets: Abhimanyu Mithun (47) (Karnataka)

The season 2009–10 of the Ranji Trophy began on 3 November, and will finish on 15 January with the final. In the Super League, 15 teams were divided into two groups. The top 3 teams of each group qualified for the playoffs, plus the top 2 teams from the Plate League (Haryana and Assam).

== First round ==
=== Group A ===
Team	Pld	Won	Lost	Tied	Draw	Aban	Pts	Quo
Tamil Nadu	7	2	0	0	5	0	26	1.484
Punjab	7	2	1	0	4	0	19	1.018
Mumbai	7	1	0	0	6	0	19	1.646
Railways	7	1	0	0	6	0	14	1.223
Odisha	7	0	1	0	6	0	12	0.857
Himachal Pradesh	7	1	3	0	3	0	10	0.875
Gujarat	7	1	3	0	3	0	10	0.770
Hyderabad	7	0	4	0	3	0	3	0.538

3–6 Nov 2009 (scorecard)	Gujarat; 270 and 301	v	Odisha; 192 and 220	Gujarat won by 159 runs Venue :Ahmedabad

3–6 Nov 2009 (scorecard)	Hyderabad (India); 328 and 189	v	Himachal Pradesh; 350 and 136/8	Match drawn Venue :Hyderabad

3–6 Nov 2009 (scorecard)	Mumbai; 471/9d	v	Punjab; 259 and 311/7	Match drawn Venue :Chandigarh

3–6 Nov 2009 (scorecard)	Railways; 327 and 178/2	v	Tamil Nadu; 337	Match Drawn; Venue :Delhi

10–13 Nov 2009 (scorecard)	Gujarat; 343 and 165/4	v	Tamil Nadu; 419/8d	Match Drawn; Venue :Ahmedabad

10–13 Nov 2009 (scorecard)	Hyderabad (India); 193 and 254/7	v	Punjab; 221 and 307/9d	Match drawn Venue :Mohali

10–13 Nov 2009 (scorecard)	Mumbai; 307/4d	v	Odisha; 243/8	Match drawn Venue :Mumbai

10–13 Nov 2008 (scorecard)	Saurashtra; 620/4d	v	Odisha; 302 and 234 (f/o)	Saurashtra won by an innings and 84 runs Venue :Rajkot

16–19 Nov 2008 (scorecard)	Delhi; 295	v	Mumbai; 330 and 468/4	Match drawn Venue :Delhi

16–19 Nov 2008 (scorecard)	Gujarat; 520/9d	v	Hyderabad (India); 225 and 287/7 (f/o)	Match drawn Venue :Ahmedabad

16–19 Nov 2008 (scorecard)	Odisha; 281 and 209	v	Rajasthan; 270 and 131/4	Match drawn Venue :Sambalpur

16–19 Nov 2008 (scorecard)	Saurashtra; 679/8	v	Punjab; 482	Match drawn Venue :Rajkot

23–26 Nov 2008 (scorecard)	Gujarat; 350 and 259/6	v	Delhi; 314	Match drawn Venue :Valsad

23–26 Nov 2008 (scorecard)	Hyderabad (India); 553/6d and 33/0	v	Rajasthan; 405	Match drawn Venue :Hyderabad

23–26 Nov 2008 (scorecard)	Odisha; 352 and 87/1	v	Punjab; 60 and 378	Odisha won by 9 wickets Venue :Bhubaneswar

23–26 Nov 2008 (scorecard)	Saurashtra; 643/4d	v	Mumbai; 214 and 157/7 (f/o)	Match drawn Venue :Rajkot

29–30 Nov 2008 (scorecard)	Delhi; 78 and 150	v	Odisha; 80 and 96	Delhi won by 52 runs Venue :Delhi

29 Nov – 1 Dec 2008 (scorecard)	Gujarat; 300 and 34/0	v	Punjab; 137 and 192 (f/o)	Gujarat won by 10 wickets Venue :Ahmedabad

29 Nov – 1 Dec 2008 (scorecard)	Saurashtra; 344	v	Rajasthan; 185 and 85 (f/o)	Saurashtra won by an innings and 74 runs Venue :Rajkot

2–5 Dec 2008 (scorecard)	Mumbai; 602/6d	v	Hyderabad (India); 251 and 243 (f/o)	Mumbai won by an innings and 108 runs Venue :Mumbai

12–15 Dec 2008 (scorecard)	Hyderabad (India); 335 and 164	v	Punjab; 291 and 211/1	Punjab won by 9 wickets Venue :Hyderabad

12–14 Dec 2008 (scorecard)	Odisha; 108 and 118	v	Mumbai; 180 and 361/5d	Mumbai won by 315 runs Venue :Cuttack

12–14 Dec 2008 (scorecard)	Rajasthan; 136 and 186	v	Gujarat; 227 and 99/3	Gujarat won by 7 wickets Venue :Jaipur

12–15 Dec 2008 (scorecard)	Saurashtra; 241 and 274	v	Delhi; 384 and 132/0	Delhi won by 10 wickets Venue :Rajkot

18–21 Dec 2008 (scorecard)	Mumbai; 436/9d and 151/1	v	Punjab; 202 and 382	Mumbai won by 9 wickets Venue :Mumbai

18–21 Dec 2008 (scorecard)	Odisha; 162 and 154	v	Gujarat; 394	Gujarat won by an innings and 78 runs Venue :Bhubaneswar

18–21 Dec 2008 (scorecard)	Rajasthan; 295 and 55/3	v	Delhi; 688	Match drawn Venue :Jaipur

18–20 Dec 2008 (scorecard)	Saurashtra; 133 and 183	v	Hyderabad (India); 140 and 71	Saurashtra won by 105 runs Venue :Rajkot

=== Group B ===
Team	Pld	Won	Lost	Tied	Draw	Aban	Pts	Quo
Karnataka	6	4	0	0	2	0	28	1.911
Uttar Pradesh	6	2	1	0	3	0	18	1.030
Delhi	6	2	1	0	3	0	17	1.013
Baroda	6	2	1	0	3	0	15	1.067
Bengal	6	1	1	0	4	0	11	0.952
Saurashtra	6	0	3	0	3	0	7	0.973
Maharashtra	6	0	4	0	2	0	4	0.494

3–6 Nov 2008 (scorecard)	Karnataka; 365 and 127	v	Railways; 389 and 17/2	Match drawn Venue :Bangalore

3–6 Nov 2008 (scorecard)	Maharashtra; 457 and 250/6 (f/o)	v	Tamil Nadu; 648/3d	Match drawn Venue :Nasik

3–6 Nov 2008 (scorecard)	Uttar Pradesh; 412	v	Andhra; 349 and 130/2	Match drawn Venue :Meerut

10–13 Nov 2008 (scorecard)	Baroda; 235 and 314	v	Uttar Pradesh; 286 and 151/6	Match drawn Venue :Vadodara

10–13 Nov 2008 (scorecard)	Karnataka; 267 and 269/4 (f/o)	v	Tamil Nadu; 531	Match drawn Venue :Bangalore

10–13 Nov 2008 (scorecard)	Maharashtra; 393 and 27/1	v	Andhra; 348 and 210/5d	Match drawn Venue :Nasik

16–19 Nov 2008 (scorecard)	Karnataka; 366 and 171	v	Andhra; 218 and 117	Karnataka won by 202 runs Venue :Mysore

16–19 Nov 2008 (scorecard)	Railways; 224 and 240/5	v	Baroda; 460/8d	Match drawn Venue :Delhi

16–18 Nov 2008 (scorecard)	Uttar Pradesh; 150 and 119	v	Tamil Nadu; 507	Tamil Nadu won by an innings and 238 runs Venue :Ghaziabad

23–26 Nov 2008 (scorecard)	Karnataka; 395 and 60/0	v	Baroda; 169 and 285	Karnataka won by 10 wickets Venue :Bangalore

23–26 Nov 2008 (scorecard)	Railways; 227 and 90/3	v	Andhra; 208 and 108	Railways won by 7 wickets Venue :Delhi

23–26 Nov 2008 (scorecard)	Uttar Pradesh; 315 and 140/2	v	Maharashtra; 221 and 230	Uttar Pradesh won by 8 wickets Venue :Kanpur

29 Nov – 2 Dec 2008 (scorecard)	Andhra; 283 and 95/3	v	Tamil Nadu; 286/4d	Match drawn Venue :Vijayawada

29 Nov – 2 Dec 2008 (scorecard)	Baroda; 305 and 229/6	v	Maharashtra; 228 and 303	Baroda won by 4 wickets Venue :Vadodara

29 Nov – 2 Dec 2008 (scorecard)	Railways; 200 and 215/8	v	Uttar Pradesh; 346 and 150/6d	Match drawn Venue :Delhi

12–14 Dec 2008 (scorecard)	Baroda; 166 and 94	v	Tamil Nadu; 117 and 402	Tamil Nadu won by 259 runs Venue :Vadodara

12–15 Dec 2008 (scorecard)	Karnataka; 511	v	Uttar Pradesh; 567	Match drawn Venue :Bangalore

12–15 Dec 2008 (scorecard)	Maharashtra; 244 and 251/5	v	Railways; 212 and 334/6d	Match drawn Venue :Ratnagiri

18–20 Dec 2008 (scorecard)	Baroda; 400	v	Andhra; 77 and 263 (f/o)	Baroda won by an innings and 60 runs Venue :Vadodara

18–20 Dec 2008 (scorecard)	Karnataka; 252 and 229	v	Maharashtra; 210 and 116	Karnataka won by 155 runs Venue :Bangalore

18–21 Dec 2008 (scorecard)	Tamil Nadu; 475/6d and 389/7d	v	Railways; 314	Match drawn Venue :Chennai

== Playoffs ==
Four top teams of the plate group league qualified for the playoffs.

Wild-Card; 15–18 December 2009
Haryana	FIL
Tripura
Assam	Win
Andhra Pradesh

Quarterfinals; 24–27 December 2009
Mumbai	FIL
Haryana
Delhi	FIL
Tamil Nadu
Karnataka	FIL
Punjab
Assam
Uttar Pradesh	FIL

Semifinals; 3–6 January 2010
Mumbai	FIL
Delhi
Karnataka	FIL
Uttar Pradesh

Final; 11–14 January 2010
Mumbai	Win
Karnataka

* FIL – First Inning's Lead

=== Plate Play Offs ===
15–18 December
(Scorecard)

Haryana (H)	v	Tripura
265 (104.3 overs); Nitin Saini 59 (133); Timir Chanda 5/56 (26 overs)		193 (97 overs); Wilkin Mota 39 (123); Amit Mishra 5/41 (32 overs)
478/6 (139 overs); Sachin Rana 163* (234); Rana Dutta 3/54 (17 overs)

Haryana advanced
Chaudhary Bansi Lal Cricket Stadium, Rohtak
Umpires: Sundaram Ravi and Suresh Shastri

15–18 December
(Scorecard)

Andhra Pradesh	v	Assam (H)
214 (93.4 overs); Avadhanam Rakesh 66 (206); Arlen Konwar 4/42 (24 overs)		327 (119 overs); Dheeraj Jadhav 165* (373); Shankara Rao 3/95 (32 overs)
241 (71.5 overs); Hemal Watekar 59 (89); Sairaj Bahutule 6/61 (28 overs)		132/5 (39.1 overs); Dheeraj Jadhav 49* (114); Shankara Rao 3/44 (15 overs)

Assam won by 5 wickets
Nehru Stadium, Guwahati
Umpires: Sudhir Asnani and Shashank Ranade

=== Quarterfinals ===
24–27 December
(scorecard)

Mumbai	v	Haryana
400 (159.4 overs); Ajinkya Rahane143 (343); Sachin Rana 4/72 (36.0)		164 (73.3 overs); Rahul Dewan 71 (186); Ramesh Powar 4/42 (22.0)
334/7 (106 overs); Ajinkya Rahane 101* (172); Amit Mishra 2/58 (19.0)

Match Drawn, Mumbai advanced to the semifinals
Chaudhary Bansi Lal Cricket Stadium, Rohtak
Umpires: Ulhas Gandhe and S Ravi

24–27 December
(scorecard)

Tamil Nadu	v	Delhi
463 (147.4 overs); Srikkanth Anirudha 113 (202); Vikas Mishra 5/112 (43.0)		490/8d (180.0 overs); Gaurav Chabra 100 (246); Aushik Srinivas 2/100 (44.0 overs)
27/0 (10.0 overs); Umashankar Sushil 11 (29)

Match Drawn, Delhi advanced to the semifinals
Palam A Ground, Model Sports Complex, Delhi
Umpires: S Asnani & Shashank Ranade

24–27 December
(scorecard)

Punjab	v	Karnataka
300 (92.4 overs); Vikas Bhalla 70* (148); Sunil Joshi 4/62 (25)		378 (107.1 overs); Manish Pandey 115 (147); Taruwar Kohli 2/37 (9.0)
367/6d (107.0 overs); Sunny Sohal89(185); Vinay Kumar 2/79 (19.0)		42/1 (24 overs); K. B. Pawan 20 (61); Love Ablish 1/15 (6)

Match Drawn, Karanatak advanced to the semifinals
Gangothri Glades Cricket Ground, Mysore
Umpires: Rajesh Deshpande & SL Shastri

24–27 December
(scorecard)

Uttar Pradesh	v	Assam
213 (81.2 overs); Mohammad Kaif 56 (150); Arlen Konwar 5/79 (27.0)		149 (54.4 overs); Amol Muzumdar 53 (132); Prashant Gupta 2/9 (8.0)
272 (100.2 overs); Piyush Chawla 53 (86); Dhiraj Goswami 5/57 (18.2)		259/8 (83.2 overs); Amol Muzumdar 119* (226); Prashant Gupta 3/89 (33.2)

Match Drawn, Uttar Pradesh advanced to the semifinals
North-East Frontier Railway Stadium, Guwahati
Umpires: Sameer Bandekar & Krishna Hariharan

=== Semifinals ===
3–6 January
(scorecard)

Mumbai	v	Delhi
500 (140.1 overs); Abhishek Nayar 156 (244); Vikas Mishra 4/89 (30.1)		211 (80.3 overs); Rajat Bhatia 85 (174); Ramesh Powar 5/47 (15.3)
187 (75.2 overs); Sahil Kukreja 71 (92); Aditya Jain 4/43 (18.2)		160/4 (38 overs); Shikhar Dhawan 40(37); Iqbal Abdulla 3/53 (15.0)

Match Drawn, Mumbai advanced to the final
Brabourne Stadium, Mumbai
Umpires: S Asnani and S Ravi

3–6 January
(scorecard)

Karnataka	v	Uttar Pradesh
575/7d (176 overs); Rahul Dravid 209 (340); RP Singh 3/93 (33.0)		208 (74.2 overs); Praveen Kumar 58 (60); Abhimanyu Mithun 4/51 (18.0)
247/8d (107 overs); C. M. Gautam 100* (169); RP Singh 4/47 (20.0)		22/1 (12 overs); Shivakant Shukla 7(20); Sreenath Aravind 1/10 (5.0)

Match Drawn, Karnataka advanced to the final
M. Chinnaswamy Stadium, Bangalore
Umpires: Krishna Hariharan and SS Hazare

=== Finals ===
11–14 January
(scorecard)

Mumbai	v	Karnataka
233 (79.0 Overs); Vinayak Samant 67 (157); Vinay Kumar 4/61 (20.0)		130 (49.3 Overs); KB Pawan 33 (85); Aavishkar Salvi 5/31 (13.3)
234 (83.3 Overs); Dhawal Kulkarni 87 (181); Abhimanyu Mithun 6/71 (22.3)		331 (88.4 Overs); Manish Pandey 144 (151); Ajit Agarkar 5/81 (22.4)

Mumbai won by 6 runs
Gangothri Glades Cricket Ground, Mysore, Karnataka
Umpires: AM Saheba and SS Hazare

== Statistics ==
=== Runs ===
Player	Team	Matches	Inns	NO	Runs	Balls	HS	Ave	100s	50s	S/Rate
Manish Pandey	Karnataka	9	14	0	882	1106	194	63.00	4	4	79.74
Ajinkya Rahane	Mumbai	9	14	3	809	1516	265*	73.54	3	3	53.56
Parthiv Patel	Gujarat	7	11	0	727	1288	166	66.09	3	4	56.44
Ganesh Satish	Karnataka	7	11	2	639	1426	141	71.00	2	3	44.81
Wasim Jaffer	Mumbai	10	14	2	638	1032	165*	53.16	3	2	61.82
KB Pawan	Karnataka	9	15	1	631	1453	152	45.07	2	2	43.42
Sunny Singh	Haryana	6	9	1	617	873	312	77.13	3	0	70.35
Dheeraj Jadhav	Assam	7	9	2	603	1577	165*	86.14	3	2	38.23
Chirag Pathak	Saurashtra	6	10	0	601	814	138	60.10	2	3	73.83
Sahil Kukreja	Mumbai	10	16	1	601	1175	122	40.06	1	4	51.14

=== Wickets ===
Player	Team	Matches	Overs	Runs	Wickets	BBI	BBM	Econ	S/R	5+/i	10+/m	Ave.
Abhimanyu Mithun	Karnataka	9	298.5	1092	47	6/71	11/181	3.65	38.1	3	1	23.23
Vinay Kumar	Karnataka	8	298.5	906	46	8/32	11/102	3.03	38.9	2	1	19.69
Love Ablish	Punjab	8	259.5	860	36	6/79	11/183	3.30	43.3	3	1	23.88
Vikramjeet Malik	Himachal Pradesh	7	248.1	587	32	6/3	8/94	2.36	46.5	2	0	18.34
Iqbal Abdulla	Mumbai	9	327.1	855	32	4/48	7/109	2.61	61.3	0	0	26.71
Piyush Chawla	Gujarat	7	284.4	882	32	5/73	6/74	3.09	53.3	1	0	27.56
Arlen Konwar	Assam	7	251.3	463	31	6/72	8/118	1.84	48.7	2	0	14.94
Manpreet Gony	Punjab	6	207	589	31	5/21	10/68	2.88	40	2	1	21.03
Pankaj Singh	Rajasthan	4	177.4	477	30	7/56	11/108	2.68	35.5	2	1	15.90
Abu Nechim	Assam	7	220.4	510	28	5/40	10/83	2.31	47.3	3	1	18.21
