= List of Assam List A cricket records =

This is a list of Assam List A cricket records, with each list containing the top five performances in the category.

Currently active players are bolded.

== Team records ==
=== Highest innings totals ===
Rank	Score	Opponent	Season
1	326/8	Punjab	2015/16
2	309	Bengal	2013/14
3	301/9	Jharkhand	2011/12
4	299/5	Bengal	2009/10
5	294/8	Bengal	2014/15
Source: CricketArchive. Last updated: 19 October 2016.

=== Lowest innings totals ===
Rank	Score	Opponent	Season
1	94	Delhi	2011/12
2	95	Bengal	2012/13
Source: CricketArchive. Last updated: 19 October 2016.

=== Largest Margin of Runs Victory ===
Rank	Margin	Opponent	Season
1	156 runs	Tripura	1996/97
2	138 runs	Tripura	1997/98
3	103 runs	Bihar	1998/99
Source: CricketArchive. Last updated: 19 October 2016.

== Batting records ==
=== Highest individual scores ===
Rank	Score	Player	Opponent	Season
1	154*	Jagadeesh Arunkumar	Orissa	2006/07
2	148*	Dheeraj Jadhav	Bengal	2009/10
3	125	Swarupam Purkayastha	Punjab	2015/16
4	117	Subhrajit Saikia	Tripura	1997/98
5	115	Dheeraj Jadhav	Bengal	2014/15
Source: CricketArchive. Last updated: 19 October 2016.

== Bowling records ==
=== Best innings bowling ===
Rank	Score	Player	Opponent	Season
1	5/30	Pritam Das	Orissa	2012/13
2	5/32	Abu Ahmed	Madhya Pradesh	2012/13
3	4/15	Javed Zaman	Bihar	2000/01
4	4/16	Rajesh Borah	Orissa	1997/98
5	4/17	Mrigen Talukdar	Tripura	2003/04
Source: CricketArchive. Last updated: 19 October 2016.

== Notes ==
All lists are referenced to CricketArchive.

== See also ==
- Assam cricket team
- List of Assam first-class cricket records
