= 2009–10 NKP Salve Challenger Trophy =

NKP Salve Challenger Trophy 2009/10
- Date: 8 – 11 October 2009
- Location: Nagpur, Maharashtra, India
- Result: Won by India Red
Teams
India Blue	India Red	India Green
Captains
(India) MS Dhoni	(India) Subramaniam Badrinath	(India) Suresh Raina
Most runs
Wasim Jaffer (181)	Murali Vijay (160)	Tanmay Srivastava (141)
Most wickets
Harbhajan Singh (8)	Munaf Patel (8)	Dhawal Kulkarni (2)

The 15th NKP Salve Challenger Trophy was an Indian domestic cricket tournament that was held in Nagpur from 8 October to 11 October 2009. The series involved the domestic teams from India which were India Blue, India Red, and India Green. India Red defeated India Blue by 7 wickets in the final to become the champions of the tournament.

== Squads ==
India Blue	India Red	India Green
MS Dhoni (c & wk); Wasim Jaffer; Abhinav Mukund; Jalaj Saxena; Suresh Kumar; Kedar Jadhav; Abhishek Nayar; Yusuf Pathan; Naman Ojha (wk); Harbhajan Singh; Siddharth Trivedi; S Sreesanth; Ashok Dinda; Dhiraj Goswami; ~~Sachin Tendulkar~~	Subramaniam Badrinath (c); Murali Vijay; Sunny Sohal; Shikhar Dhawan; Ishank Jaggi; Ravindra Jadeja; Ameya Shrikhande; Bhuvneshwar Kumar; Wriddhiman Saha (wk); Ravichandran Ashwin; Sudeep Tyagi; Munaf Patel; Saurabh Tiwary; Ishant Sharma; Harshad Khadiwale; ~~Yuvraj Singh~~	Suresh Raina (c); Ajinkya Rahane; Tanmay Srivastava; Ravi Inder Singh; Anirudha Srikkanth; Chetanya Nanda; Parthiv Patel (wk); Saurabh Tiwary; Shadab Jakati; Vikramjeet Malik; Lakshmipathy Balaji; Dhawal Kulkarni; Pankaj Singh; Uday Kaul; ~~Irfan Pathan~~; ~~Manoj Tiwary~~

- Abhinav Mukund replaced Sachin Tendulkar in the India Blue squad, after the selectors gave Tendulkar rest due to the food poisoning he suffered during the Champions trophy.
- Subramaniam Badrinath who was originally picked for India Green squad, replaced Yuvraj Singh as the captain of India Red after Yuvraj Singh had to force himself out of the tournament due to injury while Ameya Shrikhande was named as replacement.
- In India Green, Vikramjeet Malik replaced Irfan Pathan who had to also force himself out of the tournament due to an injury along with Yuvraj Singh. Saurabh Tiwary also replaced Manoj Tiwary in the squad, after Manoj Tiwary was called to represent Delhi Daredevils for the Champions League Twenty20.

== Points Table ==
Pos	Team	Pld	W	L	NR	Pts	NRR
1	India Blue	2	2	0	0	8	0.930
2	India Red	2	1	1	0	4	0.626
3	India Green	2	0	2	0	0	−1.681

Source: 'Points Table'

== Matches ==
=== Group stage ===
8 October 2009

India Red; 248 (44.4 overs)	v	India Blue; 250/9 (49.3 overs)
Harshad Khadiwale 55 (51); Harbhajan Singh 3/40 (8.4 overs)		Suresh Kumar 87 (113); Ishant Sharma 4/56 (10 overs)

India Blue won by 1 wicket.
Vidarbha Cricket Association Stadium, Nagpur
Umpires: Sanjeev Rao (IND) and Ulhas Gandhe (IND)

- India Red won the toss and elected to bat.
- Points: India Blue 4, India Red 0

9 October 2009

India Green; 223/7 (50 overs)	v	India Red; 229/2 (38.4 overs)
Saurabh Tiwary 66 (97); Munaf Patel 3/57 (10 overs)		Murali Vijay 104* (117); Dhawal Kulkarni 1/52 (8 overs)

India Red won by 8 wickets.
Vidarbha Cricket Association Stadium, Nagpur
Umpires: Rajesh Deshpande (IND) and Ulhas Gandhe (IND)

- India Green won the toss and elected to bat.
- Points: India Red 5, India Green -1

10 October 2009

India Blue; 351/2 (50 overs)	v	India Green; 263/9 (50 overs)
Wasim Jaffer 143 (143); Dhawal Kulkarni 1/69 (10 overs)		Tanmay Srivastava 100 (133); Ashok Dinda 3/54 (10 overs)

India Blue won by 88 runs.
Vidarbha Cricket Association Stadium, Nagpur
Umpires: Rajesh Deshpande (IND) and Sanjeev Rao (IND)

- India Blue won the toss and elected to bat.
- Points: India Blue 5, India Green -1

== Final ==
11 October 2009

India Blue; 84 (27.1 overs)	v	India Red; 85/3 (20.3 overs)
MS Dhoni 23 (17); Munaf Patel 4/21 (8 overs)		Shikhar Dhawan 38 (54); Harbhajan Singh 3/23 (7 overs)

India Red won by 7 wickets.
Vidarbha Cricket Association Stadium, Nagpur
Umpires: Sanjeev Rao (IND) and Ulhas Gandhe (IND)

- India Red won the toss and elected to field.
