= Jayachandra (name) =

Jayachandra was a 12th-century king from the Gahadavala dynasty of India.

Jayachandra may also refer to:

- T. B. Jayachandra (born 1949), Indian politician from Karnataka
- K. Jayachandra Reddy (born 1929), Indian Supreme Court judge
- Pinninti Jayachandra, Indian cricketer on the East Zone cricket team

== See also ==
- Jayachandran, a surname (including a list of people with the name)
