= Peter Bullock =

Peter Bullock may refer to:

- Peter Bullock (scientist) (1937–2008), soil scientist and Nobel Peace Prize winner
- Peter Bullock (footballer) (born 1941), English footballer who played as an inside forward
- Peter Bullock (died 1601), English bookbinder executed at Tyburn with James Duckett
- Peter Bullock (cricketer) (1925–1997), English cricketer
