= Gerald Eastmure =

Gerald Eastmure may refer to:

- Gerald Eastmure (cricketer) (1917–1996), English cricketer
- Gerald Eastmure (footballer) (born 1935), former Australian rules footballer
