= Avasarala =

Avasarala (Telugu: అవసరాల) is a Telugu surname. Notable people with the surname include

- Avasarala Ramakrishna Rao (1931–2011), Telugu short story writer
- Avasarala Rao (born 1959), Indian cricketer
- Chrisjen Avasarala, character from the novel and TV series The Expanse
- Srinivas Avasarala (born 1984), Indian film director
