= Rupert Kettle =

Rupert Kettle may refer to:

- Rupert Kettle (cricketer) (1915–1985), English cricketer
- Rupert Alfred Kettle (1817–1894), English barrister and county court judge
