= Denish =

Denish is both a surname and a given name. Notable people with the name include:

- Diane Denish American politician
- Denish Das Indian cricketer
