= Sanath Kumar =

Indian first-class cricketer and coach

Personal information
- Full name: Narasimha Aithal K Sanath Kumar
- Born: 12 December 1962 (age 63); Mangalore, Mysore State, India
- Batting: Right-handed
- Bowling: Right-arm medium
- Role: Bowler, Coach

Domestic team information
- Years: Team
- 1985/86–1988/89: Karnataka

Career statistics
Competition	FC	List A
Matches	11	4
Runs scored	20	4
Batting average	4.00	–
100s/50s	0/0	0/0
Top score	9	4*
Balls bowled	1335	198
Wickets	23	2
Bowling average	29.17	62.00
5 wickets in innings	2	0
10 wickets in match	1	n/a
Best bowling	7/81	1/24
Catches/stumpings	4/–	0/–
- Source: ESPNcricinfo, 26 November 2015

Sanath Kumar (born 12 December 1962) is a former Indian first-class cricketer and the former head coach of Assam, Karnataka and Baroda. Kumar played for Karnataka cricket team from 1985/86 to 1988/89. He identified the potential of Hardik Pandya who used to bowl leg spin at that time, as a fast bowling allrounder while coaching Baroda

== Career ==
Kumar was a right-arm medium pace bowler who represented Karnataka cricket team in 11 first-class and 4 List A matches between the 1985/86 and 1988/89 seasons.

Kumar took up coaching in 1990 and since 1992 trained various age-group levels of Karnataka team such as under-15, under-17, under-19 and under-22. He had worked as a talent resource development officer in the KSCA Academy. He had also coached Pahang state cricket team in Malaysia in 1994.

Kumar became the coach of the Assam cricket team before the 2005/06 season. In 2009, he returned to coach his home team Karnataka. Under his coaching, Karnataka reached the final of the 2009–10 Ranji Trophy and the semifinals in the following season. He took over as the head coach of the Baroda cricket team at the start of the 2011/12 season. Baroda won the Syed Mushtaq Ali Trophy twice during his tenure.Hardik Pandya started bowling relatively late, Initially, he dabbled in leg-spin, but it was coach Sanath Kumar who saw his potential as a fast bowler. After the 2013/14 season he quit his role with Baroda, citing the need to "spend time with family" as the reason for the decision. He returned to coach Assam from the 2014/15 season.

Kumar had also served as an assistant coach of the Indian Premier League franchise Royal Challengers Bangalore.

In August 2018, he was appointed as the coach for Meghalaya cricket team.
