= Amzad Ali =

Indian cricketer (born 1991)

Amzad Ali (Bengali: আমজ়াদ আলী; born 27 September 1991) is an Indian cricketer. He is a right-handed batsman and wicket-keeper who plays for Assam.

== Early career ==
Ali was born in Guwahati. He started playing with Assam's Under-16 team in 2001, at the age of just 10 years old, the youngest Assam player in that season's Vijay Merchant Trophy competition. At the end of the competition, he played for the Under-14s team, alongside future Assam senior team cricketers Amit Sinha and Sibsankar Roy.

At the beginning of the 2002–03 season, Ali played for the Under-15s team, in which he remained for two seasons. Ali later played for the Under-17s in the Vijay Merchant Trophy and the Under-19s in the Cooch Behar and Vinoo Mankad Trophies.

== Domestic career ==
Ali made his first-class debut at the end of 2007, playing for Assam in the 2007-08 Ranji Trophy competition against Tripura as the match finished a draw. Assam finished in third place in Plate Group A of the competition.
