= Chetia (surname) =

Chetia is a surname. Notable people with the surname include:

- Anup Chetia (born 1957), Indian insurgent
- Bolin Chetia (fl. from 2006), Indian politician
- Debajit Chetia (born 1963), Indian cricketer
- Pranati Chetia (born 1963), birth name of Pranati Phukan, Indian politician
- Purnananda Chetia (1907–?), Indian politician
- Tankeswar Chetia (1915–?), Indian politician
