= Subhadeep Ghosh =

Indian cricketer and coach (born 1968)

Personal information
- Born: 13 November 1968 (age 57); Digboi, Assam, India
- Nickname: Joy
- Batting: Right-handed
- Bowling: Right-arm offbreak
- Role: Batsman, Coach

Domestic team information
- Years: Team
- 1994/95 - 2004/05: Assam, Railways
- Source: Cricinfo, 29 May 2019

Subhadeep Ghosh is the former Indian First Class cricketer who played for Assam and Railways. He is the current fielding coach of the Indian Cricket National Team.

During his playing days, Subhadeep Ghosh played 17 First Class matches and 17 List A matches for Assam and Railways. He was a right-handed batsman who was fondly known as Joy by his teammates.
