= Javed Zaman =

Javed Zaman may refer to:

- Javed Zaman (Pakistani cricketer) (1938–2023), maternal uncle and mentor of Pakistani former cricketer Imran Khan
- Javed Zaman (Indian cricketer) (born 1976), Indian cricketer from Assam
