= Sauvik Das =

Indian cricketer (born 1983)

Personal information
- Born: 23 December 1983 (age 42); Karimganj, Assam
- Batting: Right-handed
- Bowling: Right-arm medium

Career statistics
Competition	First-class	List A
Matches	7	2
Runs scored	73	17
Batting average	7.30	8.50
100s/50s	0/0	0/0
Top score	23	12
Balls bowled	48	30
Wickets	0	0
Bowling average	–	–
5 wickets in innings	–	–
10 wickets in match	–	–
Best bowling	–	–
Catches/stumpings	9/–	0/–
- Source: Cricinfo, 3 November 2020

Sauvik Das (born 23 December 1983) is an Indian cricket player who played for Assam in the Ranji Trophy. He is right-hand batsman and right-arm medium bowler. Das has played seven Ranji Trophy matches for Assam. Das has completed NCA Level 'B' coach training.
