= Yajuvendra Krishanatry =

Indian cricketer (born 1983)

Yaju Krishanatry
Personal information
- Full name: Yajuvendra Krishanatry
- Born: 14 December 1983 (age 42); Meerut, Uttar Pradesh, India
- Batting: Right-handed
- Bowling: Right-arm medium

Domestic team information
- Years: Team
- 2008–2014: Jharkhand
- FC debut: 29 November 2008 Jharkhand v Himachal Pradesh
- LA debut: 10 February 2010 Jharkhand v Assam

Career statistics
Competition	FC	LA	T20
Matches	4	17	5
Runs scored	8	9	0
Batting average	8.00	9.00	0.00
100s/50s	0/0	0/0	0/0
Top score	8	7	0
Balls bowled	582	759	108
Wickets	4	26	8
Bowling average	72.00	24.50	15.50
5 wickets in innings	0	1	0
10 wickets in match	0	0	0
Best bowling	2/50	5/40	4/31
Catches/stumpings	0/–	5/–	0/–
- Source: , 17 June 2012

Yajuvendra Krishanatry (born 14 December 1983) also known as Yaju Krishanatry is an Indian cricketer born in Meerut, Uttar Pradesh. He is a right-handed batsman and medium-pace bowler. He plays for Jharkhand.
