= Kalyan Mitter =

Indian cricketer, coach, and curator

Personal information
- Born: 5 May 1936; Calcutta, British India
- Died: 16 August 2013 (aged 77); Kolkata, India
- Batting: Right-handed
- Bowling: Right-arm offbreak
- Role: Allrounder

Domestic team information
- Years: Team
- 1953-54 to 1964-65: Bengal
- 1965-66 to 1968-69: Bihar

Career statistics
Competition	First-class
Matches	51
Runs scored	1,698
Batting average	26.12
100s/50s	1/9
Top score	126*
Balls bowled	3339
Wickets	50
Bowling average	31.70
5 wickets in innings	1
10 wickets in match	0
Best bowling	5/39
Catches/stumpings	18/-
- Source: ESPNcricinfo, 17 August 2013

Kalyan Mitter (Bengali: কল্যাণ মিত্র; 5 May 1936 – 16 August 2013) was an Indian first-class cricketer, coach and curator. He was a right-handed batsman and right-arm offbreak bowler.

From 1953 to 1969 he represented Bengal and Bihar in the Ranji Trophy, the domestic first-class cricket competition of India. His highest score was 126 not out for Bengal in an innings victory over Assam in 1957–58. His best bowling figures were 5 for 39 for Bihar in his last match, a victory over Orissa in 1968–69.

He also coached the Bengal cricket team and under his coaching, the side became runner-up in the Ranji Trophy in 1994. He was also the curator of the Eden Gardens ground in the mid-'90s and during the inaugural edition of the IPL.
