= Deepak Gohain =

Indian cricketer (born 1992)

Personal information
- Full name: Deepak Putul Gohain
- Born: 11 December 1992 (age 33); Dibrugarh, Assam, India
- Batting: Right-handed
- Bowling: Slow left-arm orthodox

Domestic team information
- Years: Team
- 2011 – present: Assam
- Source: ESPNcricinfo, 23 October 2017

Deepak Gohain (born 11 December 1992) is an Indian cricketer. He is a slow left-arm orthodox bowler. He made his first-class debut for Assam in the 2011–12 Ranji Trophy on 29 November 2011 against Jharkhand at Dhanbad.
