= Parvej Musaraf =

Indian cricketer (born 11 December 2003)

Personal information
- Born: 11 December 2003 (age 22)
- Batting: Left-handed
- Bowling: Slow left-arm orthodox
- Role: Opening batter

Domestic team information
- Years: Team
- 2024–present: Assam
- Source: ESPNcricinfo, 25 December 2019

Parvej Musaraf (born 11 December 2003) is an Indian cricketer. He made his first-class debut on 2 February 2024, for Assam in the 2023–24 Ranji Trophy. Parvej becomes the third cricketer from Assam to score a century on Ranji Trophy debut.
