= Riyan Parag =

Indian cricketer (born 2001)

Personal information
- Full name: Riyan Parag Das
- Born: 10 November 2001 (age 25); Guwahati, Assam, India
- Batting: Right-handed
- Bowling: Right-arm off break, leg break
- Role: Batting All Rounder
- Relatives: Parag Das (father)

International information
- National side: India (2024)
- Only ODI (cap 256): 7 August 2024 v Sri Lanka
- ODI shirt no.: 12
- T20I debut (cap 113): 6 July 2024 v Zimbabwe
- Last T20I: 12 October 2024 v Bangladesh
- T20I shirt no.: 12

Domestic team information
- Years: Team
- 2016–present: Assam
- 2019–present: Rajasthan Royals

Career statistics
Competition	ODI	T20I	FC	T20
Matches	1	9	37	143
Runs scored	15	106	2,181	3,168
Batting average	15.00	17.66	34.61	30.75
100s/50s	0/0	0/0	3/13	0/23
Top score	15	34	155	95
Balls bowled	54	74	3,555	1,213
Wickets	3	4	65	48
Bowling average	18.00	20.75	34.30	30.93
5 wickets in innings	0	0	2	0
10 wickets in match	0	0	0	0
Best bowling	3/54	3/5	5/25	3/5
Catches/stumpings	0/–	6/–	27/–	68/–
Medal record
Men's cricket
Representing India
ICC U19 Cricket World Cup
Winner	2018 New Zealand
- Source: ESPNcricinfo, 25 December 2025

Riyan Parag Das (born 10 November 2001) is an Indian international cricketer who has played for the national team as an all-rounder. He captains Rajasthan Royals in the Indian Premier League and Assam when he plays domestic cricket. He is the only batsman in IPL history to hit six consecutive sixes. Riyan is also the second-youngest player to score a half-century in the IPL and was a part of the team that won the 2018 U19 World Cup. He bats right-handed in the middle-order and bowls both right-arm off spin and leg spin.

== Early and personal life ==
Riyan's father, Parag Das is a former first-class cricketer who has represented Assam, Railways, Dighalipukhuri and East Zone cricket team. Parag Das and former captain of team India MS Dhoni featured in Railways' tournaments together in Kharagpur and Guwahati. They have also played against each other in the Ranji Trophy, when Dhoni turned up for Jharkhand. On Riyan's IPL debut, Dhoni was keeping wickets and captaining the opposition.

His mother, Mithoo Barooah, is a former national record-holding swimmer in the 50m freestyle who represented India at the Asian Championships and SAF Games. The year 1985 was a landmark in her career, as she achieved an unprecedented feat for any swimmer from Assam—male or female—by winning a silver medal in the 50m breaststroke at the Asian Age Group Championship. In 1990, she set a National Junior record in the 100m breaststroke, followed by a National record in the 50m freestyle at the 1993 National Games in Pune. In 1991, she competed in the South Asian Federation Games, securing two gold medals, one silver, and one bronze. Mithoo Barooah's cousin was the multilingual singer Zubeen Garg.

== Domestic career ==
As a 14-year-old, Riyan could have been the youngest first-class debutant in India, but for the Assam selectors, who were not on the same page as the state's then coach Sanath Kumar. Riyan made his Twenty20 debut for Assam in the 2016–17 Inter State Twenty-20 Tournament on 29 January 2017.

He made his first-class debut for Assam in the 2017–18 Ranji Trophy on 17 November 2017. With that debut, he became India's first FC cricketer born in 21st century.

He was the leading run-scorer for Assam in the 2018–19 Vijay Hazare Trophy, with 248 runs in seven matches.

Riyan is said to have played a significant role in helping Assam reach the semifinals of both the 2022-23 Vijay Hazare Trophy and 2023–24 Syed Mushtaq Ali Trophy, and East Zone making the finals of the 2023 Deodhar Trophy.

In the 2022-23 Vijay Hazare Trophy, he was the highest run-getter for Assam and overall the fifth highest across sides in the season, with 552 runs at an average of 69 with three tons and one fifty. Coming in to bat at number four, he notched blistering centuries against Rajasthan, Jammu and Kashmir and Sikkim, and an unbeaten fifty against Vidarbha. He also took 10 wickets in the season with his leg-break bowling. In the quarter finals of the tournament chasing a mammoth 351 against Jammu and Kashmir, he scored 174 off 116 balls, an innings that was studded with a dozen sixes and an equal number of fours.

In one of the group stage matches of the first-class 2022-23 Ranji Trophy tournament playing against Hyderabad, Riyan struck 78 off 28 balls with the bat in the 2nd innings apart from picking up an eight wicket match-haul with his leg break bowling to help his team clinch a closely fought contest by 18 runs.

In the 2023 Deodhar Trophy, he was adjudged the Player of the Series for being the highest run-getter, highest six-hitter and third-highest wicket-taker in the tournament. He scored a total of 354 runs in the tournament at a batting average of 88.50 and snapped 11 wickets at a bowling average of 19.09. Riyan Parag surpassed Yusuf Pathan’s record of nine sixes for West Zone against North Zone (2010), to record the most sixes in an innings in the tournament's history by smashing 11 sixes against North Zone. Parag struck centuries against West Zone and North Zone. In the final of the tournament playing for East Zone against South Zone, Riyan scored a 65 ball 95 after coming to bat when his team was tottering at 72 for 4 chasing an imposing target of 329.

He then became the highest run -getter and highest six hitter with 510 runs and 40 sixes respectively in the 2023–24 Syed Mushtaq Ali Trophy. He managed to top the run scoring charts for the second tournament in a row in Indian domestic cricket. He amassed the runs at a batting average of 85 and a strike rate of 182.79, along with being the first cricketer to score seven consecutive half centuries in T20 cricket. His record-breaking seven consecutive half-centuries came against Bengal, Chandigarh, Himachal Pradesh, Bihar, Services, Sikkim and Kerala. He also contributed with the ball, scalping 11 wickets throughout the tournament.

In the same season, Riyan Parag struck consecutive first-class centuries against Chhattisgarh and Kerala and a 75 against Andhra Pradesh. He scored a total of 378 runs in 2023-24 Ranji Trophy in 6 innings at a batting average of 75.60 and a strike rate of 113.85, along with again becoming the highest six hitter of the tournament with 20 sixes in elite category. He smashed the second-fastest century in the history of Ranji Trophy, getting to the landmark off just 56 balls. He went on to score 155 playing for Assam in that away game against Chhattisgarh at Raipur. Officially Rishabh Pant scored the fastest century in Ranji trophy off 48 balls against Jharkhand in the 2016 edition of the Ranji Trophy. Unofficially, Shakti Singh holds the record for the fastest century, scoring it in just 42 balls for Himachal Pradesh against Haryana. However, there were no official scorers at the time, and the team members handled the scoring. As fate would have it, they only began counting when Singh was nearing his fifty.

Riyan was also a part of the victorious India A cricket team in the first-class 2024-25 Duleep Trophy. In the second innings of the tournament's final game, he top-scored with 73 runs against eventual runners-up India C.

Parag was initially appointed as the captain of the Assam cricket team for their tour of Namibia in June 2025. But, at the last moment, Denish Das, was named to lead the side as Parag was unavailable.

== India Under-19 career ==
In October 2017, Riyan was named in India's squad for the 2017 ACC Under-19 Asia Cup.

In 2017, he was selected for India's Under-19 squad for the two youth Tests in England. He finished the two youth Tests in England as India's second-highest run-getter, behind Prithvi Shaw. His twin fifties in the first-game - including a 33-ball half-century, the second-fastest behind Virat Kohli in recorded youth Tests, helped India set up a declaration and paved way for a 334-run victory in Chesterfield. In the second Test, he made a half-century in India's quest for quick runs, strung a 131-run stand with Shubman Gill for the fourth wicket and set up a 2–0 series win. Prior to the tour, he finished a bumper season, in which he was the second-highest run-getter in the 2016-17 Cooch Behar Trophy, India's national four-day tournament for U-19 players, with 642 runs in 14 innings and a best of 202 not out.

Riyan was selected in India A squad for India U19 Challenger trophy(2017), and became the highest run-getter in that tournament. In December 2017, he was named in India's squad for the 2018 Under-19 Cricket World Cup. According to the then India Under-19 coach Rahul Dravid, he was in phenomenal form, hitting it beautifully in the build-up, but unfortunately got injured. Parag did not start the tournament because of a finger injury, and made the XI only for the final group game against Zimbabwe. He broke his finger in the warm up games, but participated in the later half of that competition. A finger injury on his left hand affected his batting fluidity. As a result, he focused on his secondary skill and developed into an off-spinner.

== Indian Premier League ==
In December 2018, Riyan was bought by the Rajasthan Royals in the player auction for the 2019 Indian Premier League at his base price of 20 lakhs. During the 2019 Indian Premier League, he became the youngest cricketer to score a fifty in the history of the Indian Premier League. He achieved the feat at the age of 17 years and 175 days breaking the previous record of 18 years and 169 days, jointly held by Sanju Samson and Prithvi Shaw.

Riyan was released by Rajasthan Royals ahead of the mega auction for 2022 Indian Premier League. In February 2022, he was re-bought by the Rajasthan Royals in the auction for the 2022 Indian Premier League tournament.

In the 2022 Indian Premier League, he took 17 catches - the most by any Indian fielder and non-wicket-keeper in the tournament and scored a match winning 56 not out for Rajasthan Royals in a low scoring thriller against Royal Challengers Bangalore.

In the 2024 Indian Premier League, Riyan was the highest run scorer for Rajasthan Royals, overall the third highest on the run scoring charts and fifth highest on the six hitters list with 573 runs and 33 sixes respectively. Riyan Parag made history by becoming the player with the most runs in a single season while batting at number four, surpassing Rishabh Pant's 2018 record of 547 runs at the position. He was the one with the most runs scored by any uncapped player in the 2024 Indian Premier League. Parag is the first player to score more than 550 runs in a season while batting at number four.

During the 2025 Indian Premier League season, Riyan was appointed captain of the Rajasthan Royals following Sanju Samson's finger injury. He finished as the second highest run-scorer for the Rajasthan Royals in the season, with 393 runs at a strike rate of 166.52 and a total of 27 sixes. This included a 45 ball 95 against the defending champions Kolkata Knight Riders. He also contributed with the ball - picking up 3 top-order wickets in the season.

In 2026, Riyan was appointed as the captain of Rajasthan Royals for the 2026 Indian Premier League season. Rajasthan Royals finished third in the tournament, having qualified for the play-offs under his first season as a full-time captain of the franchise. On a personal front, batting at number four, he scored a total of 309 runs in the season at a strike-rate of 157.65, that included 21 sixes and picked up two wickets with the ball. His top score was a 50 ball 90, that came against the Delhi Capitals, an innings that was studded with eight fours and five sixes. Riyan also scored a 23 ball half century in one of the games.

== India A career ==
Riyan was also included in the India A cricket team squad for the 2023 ACC Emerging Teams Asia Cup. Riyan played in the final against Pakistan A where he picked up two middle-order wickets off consecutive deliveries.

In October 2025, he struck three consecutive half centuries in all three games and was adjudged the Man of The Series for his consistent performances, at an average of 62.33 and a strike rate of 123.84. He was a middle-order mainstay in the series against Australia A, eventually helping India A clinch the series 2–1.

In February 2026, he was included in the India A squad for the warm-up matches of the 2026 Men's T20 World Cup. Batting at number four in one of the games against Namibia, he top-scored for the team with a 39 ball 69.

== Senior international career ==
=== T20 Internationals ===
Riyan Parag became the first Assamese and also the first male cricketer from Northeast India to be included in the Indian National Squad when his name was selected for the T20I squad of the India National team for the series against Zimbabwe tour from 6 July 2024.

Riyan was later selected for the T20Is against Sri Lanka. He played all three games in the series and notched up career-best bowling figures of 3 wickets conceding 5 runs in the first T20I.

Riyan was part of the batting lineup that set a record for the highest-ever total by the Indian team in T20 internationals, scoring 297/6 in 20 overs. He contributed by smashing 34 off 13 deliveries, that was studded with four sixes and a four.

=== One Day International Career ===
Riyan Parag received his first call-up to the ODI squad for the Sri Lanka tour, scheduled to begin on July 27, 2024. He made his One Day International debut in the third and final match of the series, notching up a three wicket-haul on ODI debut.

== Awards and recognitions ==
He was honoured with the Lala Amarnath best allrounder award for the domestic season 2022–23 by the BCCI. The captain of the senior men's team at the time, Rohit Sharma had presented him with the award.
