= Sujay Tarafdar =

Indian cricketer (born 1989)

Personal information
- Born: 6 December 1989 (age 36); Bongaigaon, Assam, India
- Batting: Right-handed
- Bowling: Right-arm medium
- Role: Bowler

Domestic team information
- Years: Team
- 2005/06–2013/14: Assam
- 2008/09: Kolkata Tigers
- 2008/09: Royal Bengal Tigers
- Source: CricketArchive, 31 August 2016

Sujay Tarafdar (born 6 December 1989) is an Indian cricketer who plays for Assam cricket team. He also represented the Royal Bengal Tigers in now defunct ICL. He is a right-arm medium bowler. Tarafdar made his first-class debut on 23 November 2006 against Goa at Guwahati in the 2006–07 Ranji Trophy and List A debut on 13 February 2006 against Tripura at Jamadoba in the Ranji One-Day Trophy.
