= Sajjad Hussain (Indian cricketer) =

Indian cricketer (born 1974)

Personal information
- Full name: Mohammed Sajjad Zaheer Hussain
- Born: 1 April 1974 (age 52); Gauhati
- Batting: Right-handed
- Bowling: Right-arm

Sajjad Hussain (born Mohammed Sajjad Zaheer Hussain; 1 April 1974) is an Indian cricketer. He was a right-handed batsman and a right-arm bowler. He was born in Gauhati.

Hussain began his career for Assam Under-16s at the age of just 12 years old. Having played just three games in the 1992-93 Vijay Merchant Trophy competition, it wasn't until three seasons later he picked up his next appearance for the Under-16s in 1995–96. Hussain played in both the Vijay Merchant and Vijay Hazare trophy competitions that year, and in the following season, moved up to the Under-19s team.

Hussain made four appearances for Tripura, in the one-day Ranji Trophy. The team lost every game in the season's competition.

Hussain made his debut for Assam in the 2003-04 Ranji Trophy, against Karnataka, scoring just two runs in the second innings of the match.

Hussain's second and final first-class appearance for the team came in the following year's competition, against Hyderabad, against whom Assam lost by an innings margin.
