= Hrishikesh Tamuli =

Indian cricketer (born 1995)

Personal information
- Full name: Hrishikesh Ganesh Tamuli
- Born: 17 July 1995 (age 31); Kamrup, Assam, India
- Batting: Right-handed
- Role: Wicket-keeper

Domestic team information
- Years: Team
- 2018/19–present: Assam
- Source: ESPNcricinfo, 2 March 2019

Hrishikesh Tamuli (born 17 July 1995) is an Indian cricketer. He made his Twenty20 debut for Assam in the 2018–19 Syed Mushtaq Ali Trophy on 2 March 2019. He made his List A debut on 25 September 2019, for Assam in the 2019–20 Vijay Hazare Trophy.
