= Anshuman Bhagawati =

Indian cricketer

Personal information
- Born: 27 December 1978 (age 47); Biswanath Chariali, Assam, India
- Batting: Right-handed
- Bowling: Right-arm medium
- Role: Bowler

Domestic team information
- Years: Team
- 1994/95 – 1998/99: Assam
- Source: ESPNcricinfo, 17 July 2022

Anshuman Bhagawati (born 27 December 1978 in Biswanath Chariali, Assam) is a former Indian cricketer.

Bhagawati, also known as Don, was a talented right-hand batsman and bowled right-arm medium pace and represented Assam in first-class and List A matches. He made his first-class debut on 13 February 1995 at the age of 16 and became the youngest player from Assam to play first-class cricket and his final appearance came when he was only 20. His best performance came against Bengal in 1996 when he took 6/49.

In May 2006 Bhagawati opened The City Cricket Academy in Leicester. In February 2008 Mike Gatting, former England and Middlesex captain, opened their new state of the art premises at Freeman's Common. Bhagawati then went on to create a team named CCA (City Cricket Academy) for junior cricketers.

Bhagawati is the Director for City Cricket Academy.
