= Samarjit Neogi =

Indian cricketer

Samarjit Neogi is an Indian former cricketer who played for Assam.

Neogi made a single first-class appearance, during the 1989-90 Ranji Trophy competition, against Orissa. Batting in the upper-middle order, Neogi scored 46 runs in the first innings – the second highest individual score of the innings – and 4 runs in the second.
