= Pankaj Tamuli =

Indian cricketer (1985–2020)

Personal information
- Born: 28 November 1985; Digboi, India
- Died: 13 December 2020 (aged 35); Guwahati, India
- Batting: Right-handed
- Bowling: Right-arm offbreak

Domestic team information
- Years: Team
- 2002/03–2002/03: Assam
- Source: Cricinfo, 26 May 2019

Pankaj Tamuli (28 November 1985 – 13 December 2020) was an Indian cricketer. He was a right-handed batsman and a right-arm medium-pace bowler, who played for Assam. He was born in Digboi.

Tamuli made his debut in the National Under-22 Tournament in 2001–02 and made his only First-class appearance in the 2002–03 Ranji Trophy, against Punjab. From the upper-middle order, he scored 23 runs in the first innings in which he batted, and a duck in the second. Tamuli died in Guwahati on 13 December 2020 after a prolonged illness.
