= Nandan Bezbarua =

Indian cricketer

Personal information
- Born: 1945 or 1946
- Died: 24 August 2007 (aged 61); Guwahati, Assam, India
- Role: Opening batsman

Domestic team information
- Years: Team
- 1966/67–1979/80: Assam

Career statistics
Competition	First-class
Matches	16
Runs scored	382
Batting average	12.73
100s/50s	0/1
Top score	59
Balls bowled	223
Wickets	1
Bowling average	166.00
5 wickets in innings	0
10 wickets in match	0
Best bowling	1/2
Catches/stumpings	7/–
- Source: CricketArchive, 27 May 2015

Nandan Bezbarua (1945 or 1946 – 24 August 2007) was an Indian cricketer who played first-class cricket for Assam from 1967 to 1979 and later served as secretary of the Assam Cricket Association.

A middle-order and opening batsman, Bezbarua played four matches for Assam in the Ranji Trophy from 1966–67 to 1970–71 with little success, then returned to the team in 1974–75. In his third match that season he opened the batting and top-scored in each innings, although he made only 11 and 8 not out, and Assam totalled only 35 and 33 and lost to Bengal by an innings and 282 runs. In the second innings he carried his bat. He had his most successful season in 1977–78, scoring 121 runs at an average of 24.20, including his highest score of 59 (equal top score) against Bihar.

Bezbarua captained Assam in his last season, 1979–80. He top-scored in the first innings of the first match with 29, and finished the season with 84 runs at 14.00 in Assam's three matches; Assam's highest scorer that season made 85 runs. He later served two terms as honorary secretary of the Assam Cricket Association.

Bezbarua died of kidney disease in hospital in Guwahati in August 2007, aged 61. He and his wife had two sons.
