= Garrison Ground, Shillong =

Multi purpose stadium in Shillong, Meghalaya, India

Garrison Ground
- Full name: Garrison Ground
- Location: Shillong, Meghalaya
- Owner: Northern Railway
- Operator: Northern Railway
- Capacity: 5,000

Construction
- Groundbreaking: 1963
- Opened: 1963

Tenant
- Shillong Lajong F.C.

Website
- CricketArchive

Garrison Ground is a multi purpose stadium in Shillong, Meghalaya. The ground is mainly used for organizing matches of football, cricket and other sports. It hosts the home matches of Shillong Lajong FC of the I-League.

The stadium has hosted single Ranji Trophy matches from 1964 when Assam cricket team played against United Provinces cricket team until 1989 but since then the stadium has hosted non-first-class matches.
