= Samarjit Nath =

Indian cricketer (born 1981)

Personal information
- Born: 1 November 1981 (age 45); Bongaigaon, Assam
- Batting: Right-handed
- Role: Wicket-keeper

Domestic team information
- Years: Team
- 2001: Assam
- Source: ESPNcricinfo, 25 May 2016

Samarjit Nath (born 1 November 1981) was an Indian cricketer. He was a right-handed batsman and wicket-keeper who played for Assam. He was born at Bongaigaon.

Nath made his cricketing debut in the 1997–98 Vijay Merchant Trophy, becoming one of the only players in the Under-16 team to play first-class cricket.

The following season, he played for the Under-19s in the Cooch Behar Trophy, a competition in which he played for two seasons.

Nath made his only first-class appearance in the 2001–02 Ranji Trophy season, against Tripura. From the tailend, he scored 12 not out in the only innings in which he batted. As a wicket-keeper, he took ten catches and took one stumping.
