= Narsimh Bhandari =

Indian cricketer (1934–2017)

Personal information
- Born: 20 June 1934
- Died: 17 November 2017 (aged 83)
- Source: ESPNcricinfo, 9 May 2018

Narsimh Bhandari (20 June 1934 – 17 November 2017) was an Indian cricketer. He played in seven first-class matches between 1959 and 1961, scoring a century on debut for Bihar cricket team. He also played for East Zone cricket team in the 1961–62 Duleep Trophy.

== See also ==
- List of East Zone cricketers
