= Pabitra Dutta =

Indian cricketer (born 1969)

Personal information
- Full name: Pabitra Kumar Dutta
- Born: 27 November 1969 (age 56); Sibsagar, Assam
- Batting: Right-handed
- Bowling: Right-arm off break
- Role: Batsman

Domestic team information
- Years: Team
- 1987/88–2001/02: Assam
- Source: ESPNcricinfo, 24 October 2017

Pabitra Dutta (born 27 November 1969) is an Indian cricketer who played domestic cricket for Assam cricket team. He is a right-handed batsman. Dutta made his first-class debut for Assam in the 1987/88 Ranji Trophy. He played 33 first-class matches and 13 List A matches. After retirement he is involved in coaching. He coached the Assam under 23 team.
