= Pritam Debnath =

Indian cricketer (born 1987)

Personal information
- Full name: Pritam Khokhan Debnath
- Born: 25 July 1987 (age 39); Guwahati, Assam, India
- Batting: Right-handed
- Role: Batsman

Domestic team information
- Years: Team
- 2008–present: Assam
- Source: , 9 February 2017

Pritam Debnath (born 25 July 1987) is an Indian cricketer. He is a right-handed batsman who plays for Assam. He was born in Guwahati.

Debnath made his cricketing debut in 2006–07, for Assam Under-22s, playing one game each in the 2006–07 and 2007–08 seasons.

Debnath made his first-class debut in the Ranji Trophy competition of 2008–09, against Vidarbha. From the opening order, he scored a golden duck in the first innings of the match and 7 runs in the second.
