= Hemanga Baruah =

Indian cricketer (1966–2015)

Personal information
- Born: 14 March 1966; Gauhati, India
- Died: 14 November 2015 (aged 49); Guwahati, India
- Batting: Left-handed
- Bowling: Right-arm fast-medium
- Role: Bowler

Domestic team information
- Years: Team
- 1984/85-1991/92: Assam
- Source: ESPNcricinfo, 28 July 2016

Hemanga Baruah (14 March 1966 – 14 November 2015) was an Indian first-class cricketer from Assam. He played for Assam between 1984/85 – 1991/92. He was a left hand batsman and right-arm medium-pace bowler. He was born in Gauhati.

Baruah was one of the finest swing bowlers ever produced by Assam. He started his cricket from Gauhati Town Club. He played for Assam in Vijay Merchant Trophy in 1980, Cooch Behar Trophy and CK Nayudu Trophy in 1982.

Baruah made his first-class debut against Bihar in 1984-85 Ranji Trophy and took five wickets in his very first innings (5/52). He played 20 first-class matches and took 50 wickets during 1984–85 to 1991–92. His best bowling figures were 5/38 against Tripura. He also played for the Indian school team against West Indies school team and took the wicket of Brian Lara at the Nehru Stadium in the year 1984. Hemanga Baruah also represented India U-19 in one youth Test Match against Australia U-19 which was held from 9 to 12 March 1985 at Patna.
