= Sushil Uzir =

Indian cricketer

Personal information
- Full name: Sushil Uzir
- Born: 1 March 1957 (age 69); Gauhati, (now Guwahati), Assam
- Batting: Right-handed
- Bowling: Right-arm medium

Domestic team information
- Years: Team
- 1975/76 - 1987/88: Assam
- Source: Cricinfo, 2 March, 2021

Sushil Uzir (born 1 March 1957 in Gauhati, Assam) is an Indian cricketer who played domestic cricket for Assam cricket team. He is a right-handed batsman and right-arm medium. Uzir made his first-class debut for Assam in the 1975/76 Ranji Trophy. He played 27 first-class matches for Assam from 1975/76 to 1987/88.
