= Aswani Rajbanshi =

Indian cricketer

Aswani Rajbanshi was an Indian cricketer. He played for Assam. Rajbanshi was born at Pandu in Guwahati. He played 19 first-class matches for Assam from 1954/55 to 1964/65 and took 88 wickets. He died on February 28, 2002.
