= Mrinmoy Dutta =

Indian cricketer (born 1998)

Personal information
- Full name: Mrinmoy Khirud Dutta
- Born: 24 November 1998 (age 27); Nagaon, Assam, India
- Batting: Left-handed
- Bowling: Left-arm fast-medium
- Role: Bowler

Domestic team information
- Years: Team
- 2016–present: Assam
- Source: ESPNcricinfo, 21 November 2016

Mrinmoy Dutta (born 24 November 1998) is an Indian cricketer who plays for Assam. He made his first-class debut for Assam in the 2016–17 Ranji Trophy on 21 November 2016. He was the leading wicket-taker for Assam in the 2018–19 Vijay Hazare Trophy, with seven dismissals in five matches. Mrinmoy Dutta is called by Rajasthan Royals for the upcoming IPL 2020 to be held on UAE as Net Bowler. Mrinmoy previously impressed the Royals when they are practicing in Guwahati.
