= Zahir Alam =

Indian cricketer (1970–2012)

Personal information
- Full name: Zahir Iqbal Alam
- Born: 10 April 1970; Gauhati, India
- Died: 30 May 2012 (aged 42); Bangalore, India
- Batting: Right-handed
- Bowling: Legbreak googly
- Role: Batsman

Domestic team information
- Years: Team
- 1988/89–1994/95: Assam
- Source: CricInfo, 31 August 2016

Zahir Iqbal Alam (10 April 1970 – 30 May 2012) was an Indian first-class cricketer who played for Assam cricket team from 1988 to 1995. He was born in Gauhati, Assam. He was a prolific right-handed batsman. Alam appeared in 22 first class matches, scored 1,398 runs with an average of 36.78 and his highest score was 257. Lalchand Rajput and Alam held the partnership record. While in Bangalore, his death occurred during 30 May 2012.
