= Kunal Saikia =

Indian cricketer (born 1988)

Personal information
- Full name: Kunal Naren Saikia
- Born: 19 June 1988 (age 38); North Lakhimpur, Assam, India
- Batting: Right-handed
- Role: Wicket-keeper batter

Domestic team information
- Years: Team
- 2006–present: Assam
- Source: ESPNcricinfo, 28 February 2021

Kunal Naren Saikia (born 19 June 1988) is an Indian first-class cricketer who plays for Assam in domestic cricket. Saikia is a right-handed batter and wicket-keeper. He made his first-class debut against Goa at Guwahati in the 2006–07 Ranji Trophy.
