= Sandir Om Prakash =

Indian cricketer

Personal information
- Born: 9 November 1929; British India
- Died: 8 August 1994 (aged 64)
- Role: All-rounder

Domestic team information
- Years: Team
- 1945-46 to 1946-47: Southern Punjab
- 1947-48 to 1950-51: Uttar Pradesh
- 1951-52 to 1957-58: Bihar

Career statistics
Competition	First-class
Matches	30
Runs scored	1221
Batting average	25.97
100s/50s	2/5
Top score	124
Balls bowled	3260
Wickets	46
Bowling average	36.47
5 wickets in innings	0
10 wickets in match	0
Best bowling	4/22
Catches/stumpings	18/0
- Source: Cricinfo, 5 March 2021

Sandir Om Prakash (9 November 1929 – 8 August 1994) was an Indian first-class cricketer who represented Southern Punjab, Uttar Pradesh and Bihar in the Ranji Trophy from 1946 to 1958.

A batsman who sometimes opened the innings, and a bowler who sometimes opened the bowling, Om Prakash was most successful in his stint with Bihar, beginning in 1951. In his second match for them, in the 1951–52 Ranji Trophy, he opened the batting and scored 122 in 148 minutes in the second innings against Holkar. Two years later he scored his second first-class century, 124 for Bihar against Bengal, in a match in which he opened both batting and bowling. His best bowling figures were 4 for 22 and 4 for 35 for United Provinces against Bihar in 1947–48.

Om Prakash was selected in an Indian XI for one of the matches against the Commonwealth XI in 1953–54, but the match was abandoned after student protesters dug up the pitch the day before the match was due to start. He was never selected for India again, but he did play for a team representing the rest of India in a friendly match against Bombay in 1954–55.

He should not be confused with Om Prakash Kumaria, an all-rounder for Eastern Punjab in the 1950s.
