= Sahil Kukreja =

Indian cricketer (born 1985)

Personal information
- Full name: Sahil Omprakash Kukreja
- Born: 9 July 1985; Bombay (now Mumbai), India
- Source: ESPNcricinfo, 24 November 2016

Sahil Kukreja (born 9 July 1985) is a former Indian first-class cricketer who played for Mumbai. He made his first-class debut for Mumbai in the 2005–06 Ranji Trophy on 1 December 2005. He retired from all forms of cricket in 2011 at the age of 26, to study for an MBA degree in England.
