= Tarjinder Singh =

Indian cricketer (born 1987)

Personal information
- Born: 22 December 1987 (age 38); Guwahati, Assam, India
- Batting: Right-handed
- Bowling: Right-arm off break
- Role: Batsman

Domestic team information
- Years: Team
- 2005–present: Assam
- Source: Cricinfo, 4 October 2015

Tarjinder Singh (born 22 December 1987) is an Indian first-class cricketer who plays for Assam. Singh is a right-handed middle order batsman. He made his first-class debut against Rajasthan at Udaipur in 2005-06 Ranji Trophy.
