= Tapan Barua =

Indian cricketer

Personal information
- Died: 9 June 2014; Assam, India
- Source: ESPNcricinfo, 20 April 2016

Tapan Barua (date of birth unknown, died 9 June 2014) was an Indian cricketer. He played fifteen first-class matches for Assam between 1956 and 1966.
