= Rishav Das =

Indian cricketer (born 1989)

Personal information
- Full name: Rishav Kalapkanti Das
- Born: 16 December 1989 (age 36); Guwahati, India
- Batting: Right-handed
- Bowling: Right-arm off break
- Role: Batter

Domestic team information
- Years: Team
- 2013–present: Assam
- Source: Cricinfo, 4 October 2015

Rishav Das (born 16 December 1989) is an Indian first-class cricketer who plays for Assam in domestic cricket. He is a right-handed opening batter. Das made his first-class debut against Jammu and Kashmir at Jammu in the 2013–14 Ranji Trophy. He made his List A debut on 27 February 2014, for Assam in the 2013–14 Vijay Hazare Trophy.
