= Mrigen Talukdar =

Indian cricketer (born 1984)

Personal information
- Full name: Mrigen Talukdar
- Born: 29 December 1984 (age 41); Guwahati, Assam
- Batting: Right-handed
- Bowling: Right-arm medium

Career statistics
Competition	FC	LA	T20
Matches	13	13	4
Runs scored	273	121	46
Batting average	13.00	13.44	11.50
100s/50s	0/0	0/0	0/0
Top score	39	24	26
Balls bowled	1159	456	18
Wickets	14	11	0
Bowling average	41.00	33.81	–
5 wickets in innings	0	0	–
10 wickets in match	0	0	–
Best bowling	2/30	4/17	–
Catches/stumpings	7/–	8/–	1/–
- Source: ESPNcricinfo, 2 October 2020

Mrigen Talukdar (born 29 December 1984) is an Indian cricket player who played for Assam in the Ranji Trophy. He was right-hand batsman and right-arm medium bowler. Talukdar has played thirteen Ranji Trophy matches for Assam.

Talukdar represented India Under-15 team in the year 1999–00 in Asia Cup tournament as a vice-captain in Malaysia. He also represented India Under-15 team in U-15 World Cup, in the year 2000 in England.
