= Akash Sengupta =

Indian cricketer (born 2000)

Personal information
- Full name: Akash Ashish Sengupta
- Born: 26 October 2000 (age 26); Goalpara, Assam, India
- Batting: Right-handed
- Bowling: Right-arm medium-fast
- Role: All-rounder

Domestic team information
- Years: Team
- 2021/22–present: Assam

Career statistics
Competition	FC	LA	T20
Matches	13	13	17
Runs scored	393	99	108
Batting average	21.83	12.37	10.80
100s/50s	0/2	0/0	0/0
Top score	92	23*	40
Balls bowled	1,471	472	284
Wickets	16	15	16
Bowling average	63.25	28.40	27.87
5 wickets in innings	0	1	0
10 wickets in match	0	0	0
Best bowling	3/57	5/20	3/29
Catches/stumpings	7/–	1/–	9/–
- Source: ESPNcricinfo, 15 March 2025

Akash Sengupta (born 26 October 2000) is an Indian cricketer who made his Twenty20 debut on 9 November 2021, for Assam in the 2021–22 Syed Mushtaq Ali Trophy. He made his first-class debut for Assam in the 2022–23 Ranji Trophy on 13 December 2022 against Saurashtra.
