= Love Ablish =

Indian first-class cricketer (born 1982)

Personal information
- Full name: Lovesh Ablish
- Born: 3 December 1982 (age 43); Ludhiana, Punjab, India
- Batting: Right-handed
- Bowling: Right-arm medium
- Role: Bowler

Domestic team information
- Years: Team
- 2004/05–2011/12: Punjab
- 2010-2011: Kings XI Punjab

Career statistics
Competition	FC	LA	T20
Matches	16	7	22
Runs scored	279	27	6
Batting average	19.92	–	–
100s/50s	0/1	0/0	0/0
Top score	76	19*	4*
Balls bowled	2,800	318	456
Wickets	57	8	36
Bowling average	24.80	29.62	13.86
5 wickets in innings	4	0	2
10 wickets in match	1	0	0
Best bowling	6/79	3/28	5/6
Catches/stumpings	2/–	0/–	1/–
- Source: ESPNcricinfo, 8 August 2025

Lovesh Ablish (born 3 December 1982) is an Indian first-class cricketer. He is a former member of Indian World Team in the Indian Cricket League Twenty20 competition. He also played in the Ranji Trophy.
