= Avasarala Rao =

Indian cricketer (born 1959)

Avasarala Padmanabha Rao (born 12 September 1959) was an Indian cricketer. He was a right-handed batsman and left-arm medium-pace bowler who played for Assam. He was born in Madras.

Rao made a single first-class appearance for the side, during the 1987–88 season, against Bengal. From the upper-middle order, he scored a duck in the only innings in which he batted. He took figures of 0-7 from 2 overs.
