= Kiran Powar =

Indian cricketer (born 1976)

Kiran Pawar
Personal information
- Full name: Kiran Rajaram Powar
- Born: 6 April 1976 (age 50); Bombay, Maharashtra, India
- Batting: Left-handed
- Bowling: Right arm off spin
- Role: Batsman
- Relatives: Ramesh Powar (brother)

Domestic team information
- Years: Team
- 1996/97–2000/01: Mumbai
- 2001/02: Goa
- 2002/03–2003/04: Assam
- 2004/05–2006/07: Baroda
- FC debut: 25 February 1997 Mumbai v Haryana
- Last FC: 4 December 2006 Baroda v Saurashtra
- LA debut: 21 November 2000 Mumbai v Gujarat
- Last LA: 9 March 2006 West Zone v South Zone

Career statistics
Competition	First-class	List A
Matches	39	32
Runs scored	2,562	867
Batting average	42.00	34.68
100s/50s	8/14	1/5
Top score	175	114
Balls bowled	1,156	548
Wickets	10	9
Bowling average	60.60	49.00
5 wickets in innings	0	0
10 wickets in match	0	0
Best bowling	2/39	2/7
Catches/stumpings	26/–	10/–
- Source: CricketArchive, 30 September 2008

Kiran Rajaram Powar (born 6 April 1976) is an Indian cricketer. He is a left-handed batsman and a right-arm offbreak bowler and is the brother of Ramesh Powar.

== Playing career ==
Powar led the U-19 team that visited Australia in 1994/95 season. The series was lost 2–0 (Test matches) and 2–1 (Youth ODI). Powar was inconsistent in the series and had one score of fifty in the ODI match leading India to their sole tour victory and a century in the fourth innings of the final test that was lost to Australia.

Powar made his debut in Ranji Trophy domestic cricket in the 1996/97 season but with the overcrowded Mumbai batting talent, moved his skills to Goa in 1997/98. He represented Assam in one season (2003/04) and moved to Vadodara in 2004/05 season. He stopped playing List A cricket in 2005/06 season but continues to play Ranji cricket.the never achieved his true potential. He never received an opportunity to play International Cricket and retired from domestic cricket after the 2003/04 season.

== ICL career ==
He was one of the cricketer who signed for thebIndian Cricket League and one of the star for Mumbai Champs an ICL team.

== Coaching career ==
In 2012, Powar was named as under-19s coach of Vidarbha cricket team.
