= Gerald Eastmure (cricketer) =

English cricketer

Gerald Eastmure (24 January 1917 – 31 December 1996) was an English cricketer. He was a right-handed batsman and wicket-keeper who played for Assam. He was born in Ealing and died in Mauritius.

Eastmure made two appearances for the team in the Ranji Trophy, scoring 5 runs on his debut in an innings defeat against Holkar, and in his second match, two seasons later, scoring 22 and 36 runs.
