= Jitumoni Kalita =

Indian cricketer (born 2000)

Personal information
- Full name: Jitumoni Niranjan Kalita
- Born: 10 October 2000 (age 26); Lakhimpur, Assam, India
- Batting: Right-handed
- Bowling: Legbreak

Domestic team information
- Years: Team
- 2017-18-present: Assam
- Source: ESPNcricinfo, 8 February 2018

Jitumoni Kalita (born 10 October 2000) is an Indian cricketer. He made his List A debut for Assam in the 2017–18 Vijay Hazare Trophy on 8 February 2018. He made his Twenty20 debut for Assam in the 2018–19 Syed Mushtaq Ali Trophy on 21 February 2019.
