= S. K. Girdhari =

Indian cricketer (1920–2006)

Personal information
- Full name: Surjuram Kahojia Girdhari
- Born: 14 April 1920; Karachi, British India
- Died: 15 April 2006 (aged 86); Kendal, Cumbria, England
- Batting: Right-handed
- Bowling: Right-arm off-spin

Domestic team information
- Years: Team
- 1940-41 to 1943-44: Sind
- 1944-45 to 1945-46: Western India
- 1946-47 to 1947-48: Kathiawar
- 1948-49 to 1952-53, 1959-60: Bengal
- 1948-49 to 1958-59: East Zone
- 1954-55 to 1957-58: Assam

Career statistics
| Competition | First-class |
|---|---|
| Matches | 48 |
| Runs scored | 2436 |
| Batting average | 36.90 |
| 100s/50s | 4/9 |
| Top score | 229 not out |
| Balls bowled | 9239 |
| Wickets | 196 |
| Bowling average | 20.39 |
| 5 wickets in innings | 14 |
| 10 wickets in match | 2 |
| Best bowling | 8/55 |
| Catches/stumpings | 41/– |
- Source: Cricket Archive, 12 January 2015

Surjuram Kahojia Girdhari (14 April 1920 – 15 April 2006) played first-class cricket in India from 1940 to 1960, and then played club cricket in England.

== Career in western India ==
S.K. Girdhari made his first-class debut in 1940-41 for Sind, playing principally as an off-spinner. In his second match, in 1941-42, batting at number 10, he made 93; thereafter he usually batted higher up the order. In 1944-45 for Western India against Gujarat he scored 44 and 149 and took 1 for 19 and 5 for 23. A few weeks later, in a 12-a-side first-class match, he took 8 for 60. He played for a Rest of India team against the India to England Touring Team in 1946-47.

After Partition, Girdhari played a season for Kathiawar in 1947-48. He took 3 for 29 and 8 for 55 and made 40 not out and 14 not out in a low-scoring victory over Gujarat. In his next match he took 2 for 63 and 6 for 63 in a two-wicket victory over Baroda.

== Career in eastern India ==
The next season, Girdhari moved across the country to Bengal. In 1948-49 he took 5 for 31 and 1 for 42 when East Zone inflicted the only defeat on the touring West Indians. In the Ranji Trophy final in 1952-53 he made 45 and 58 not out, and took 2 for 102 and, in the second innings, as Bengal vainly strove to dismiss Holkar to win the match, and Holkar held on for a draw and the trophy, he had figures of 36–27–17–3.

In 1954-55 Girdhari moved even further east to play for Assam. Against Bihar in his first match, when 40 wickets fell for 330 runs on a "treacherous pitch" at Jorhat, he top-scored in each innings with 14 and 46, and took 6 for 20 and 6 for 46, but Bihar still won by 46 runs. In an innings defeat to Bengal in 1956-57 he took 7 for 157 and again top-scored in each innings with 14 and 100. Against Orissa in 1957-58 he scored a career-best 229 not out, which remained the individual record score for Assam until 1991-92.

Girdhari returned to Bengal for a final season in 1959-60, scoring 129 not out and taking 6 for 37 and 1 for 24 in an innings victory over Orissa.

== Career in England ==
Girdhari played for Millom in the North Lancashire League from 1953 to 1957. He played a season as a professional with Accrington in the Lancashire League in 1958, scoring 314 runs at 22.42 and taking 38 wickets at 14.76. Girdhari is "best remembered as an immaculately dressed and polite presence at Netherfield, where he played when they joined the Northern League in 1959". His all-round performance of 112 and 9 wickets for 51 for Netherfield against Kendal in 1961 remains a club record. His brother Amarnath Girdhari played Ranji Trophy cricket for Bengal and was a teammate in Netherfield.

During his club career, Girdhari settled in England permanently. He died in Kendal, Cumbria, in 2006.
