= Prashant Gupta =

Indian cricketer (born 1988)

Personal information
- Born: 23 June 1988 (age 38); Kanpur, Uttar Pradesh, India
- Batting: Right-handed
- Bowling: Right-arm leg break
- Role: All-rounder

Domestic team information
- Years: Team
- 2008—present: Uttar Pradesh
- Source: Cricinfo, 18 October 2015

Prashant Gupta (born 23 June 1988) is an Indian first-class cricketer who plays for Uttar Pradesh. He made his first-class debut for Uttar Pradesh in the Ranji Trophy Superleague phase on 18 November 2008. He made his List A debut for Uttar Pradesh in the Vijay Hazare Trophy on 14 February 2013. He made his Twenty20 debut for Uttar Pradesh in the Syed Mushtaq Ali Trophy on 24 October 2011. He retired from Indian first class setup in 2019 to ply his trade in overseas leagues. He was drafted in by Deccan Gladiators in 2019 in the Abu Dhabi T10 League. He also featured in the 2021 edition for Deccan Gladiators under Kieron Pollard's captaincy. Outside of cricket he has a keen interest in small (always spherical) particles.
