= Debajit Chetia =

Indian cricketer (born 1963)

Debajit Chetia (Assamese: দেৱজিত চেতিয়া) (born 31 July 1963) was an Indian cricketer. He was a right-handed batsman who played for Assam. He was born in Gauhati.

Having represented the Under-22s team between 1980 and 1985, Chetia made a single first-class appearance for the side, during the 1987–88 season, against Orissa. From the upper-middle order, Chetia scored a single run in the first innings in which he batted, and, when switched to the lower order for the second innings, he scored a duck.
