= Jayachandran =

Jayachandran is a surname. Notable people with the surname include:

- M. Jayachandran (born 1971), Indian film score composer, singer, and musician
- P. Jayachandran (1944–2025), Indian playback singer and classical musician
