= Vinayak Samant =

Indian cricketer (born 1972)

Personal information
- Full name: Vinayak Radhakrishna Samant
- Born: 25 October 1972 (age 53); Mumbai, Maharashtra
- Batting: Right-handed
- Role: Wicketkeeper

Domestic team information
- Years: Team
- 1995/96–2000/01: Assam
- 2002/03–2009/10: Mumbai
- 2011/12: Tripura
- Source: ESPNcricinfo, 24 April 2016

Vinayak Radhakrishna Samant (born 25 October 1972) is an Indian cricketer who played for Tripura, Mumbai and Assam. Born at Mumbai, he is a right-handed wicket-keeper batsman. Samant mainly played in the shadow of Sameer Dighe as Dighe was first-choice keeper for Mumbai. Samant played for Assam from 1995 to 2001. He returns to Mumbai when Sameer Dighe retire. He played eight seasons with Mumbai before moving to Tripura an retiring in 2012. Since retiring he took-up coaching, becoming the head coach for Mumbai in July 2018.
