= Nishanta Bordoloi =

Indian cricketer

Personal information
- Full name: Nishanta Harmohan Bordoloi
- Born: 29 December 1977 (age 48); Guwahati, Assam, India
- Batting: Right-handed
- Bowling: Right-arm offbreak
- Role: Batsman

Domestic team information
- Years: Team
- 1994/95–2008: Assam
- Source: ESPNcricinfo, 7 September 2016

Nishanta Bordoloi (born 29 December 1977) is an Indian cricketer who played for Assam cricket team. He is a right-handed batsman who bowled right-arm offbreak. Bordoloi made his first-class debut in the 1994/95 Ranji Trophy. He played 35 first-class matches and 29 List A matches for Assam.

== Coaching career ==
Bordoloi has worked as the strength conditioning & fielding coach of the Delhi team and the fielding coach of the Kings XI Punjab team in the Indian Premier League.

In June 2018, he was appointed as the faculty member of BCCI's National Cricket Academy.
