= Palash Jyoti Das =

Indian cricketer (born 1984)

Personal information
- Born: 23 December 1984 (age 41); Guwahati, Assam, India
- Batting: Right-handed
- Bowling: Right-arm offbreak
- Role: Batsman

Domestic team information
- Years: Team
- 2001/02 - 2008: Assam
- Source: ESPNcricinfo, 29 May 2019

Palash Jyoti Das (born 23 December 1984) is an Indian cricketer who plays for Assam cricket team. He is a right-handed top-order batsman who bowled right-arm offbreak.

Palash Jyoti Das made his first-class appearance in the 2001/02 Ranji Trophy. He represented India Under-15 Team in the year 1999/2000 in Asia Cup. Again in England, represented India Under-15 Team in U/15 World Cup in the year .
