= Bimal Bharali =

Indian cricketer

Domestic team information
- Years: Team
- 1969-70 to 1980-81: Assam

Career statistics
Competition	First-class
Matches	31
Runs scored	1240
Batting average	22.96
100s/50s	2/4
Top score	141
Balls bowled	426
Wickets	5
Bowling average	39.00
5 wickets in innings	0
10 wickets in match	0
Best bowling	2/8
Catches/stumpings	13/–
- Source: CricketArchive, 6 June 2019

Bimal Bharali is a former Indian cricketer. He played 27 first-class matches for Assam and four for East Zone from 1969 to 1981. He captained Assam in most of their matches from 1976 to 1981.

A middle-order batsman, Bharali's highest score was 141 in a Ranji Trophy match against Orissa in 1976–77. His other first-class century was also against Orissa, in 1980–81, when he went to the wicket at 40 for 3 and scored 119 out of a team total of 245. In 1976–77, playing for East Zone against the touring MCC, he saved the match almost single-handedly by batting for almost the entire 54-over second innings and finishing on 45 not out.

Bharali served as a selector for Assam for some years before resigning in protest in 2005 when the Assam Cricket Association failed to comply with its own regulations when appointing a coach.
