= Madhurya Barua =

Indian cricketer (born 1942)

Personal information
- Full name: Madhurya Prasad Barua
- Born: 22 April 1942 (age 84); Jorhat, Assam Province, British India
- Batting: Right-handed

Domestic team information
- Years: Team
- 1954/55 - 1972/73: Assam, Bengal
- Source: ESPNcricinfo, 25 March 2016

Madhurya Barua (born 22 April 1942) is an Indian former cricketer. He played first-class cricket for Assam and Bengal.

== See also ==
- List of Bengal cricketers
