= Peter Bullock (cricketer) =

English cricketer

Personal information
- Full name: Peter Warner Bullock
- Born: 6 January 1925; Harringay, Middlesex, England
- Died: 16 February 1997 (aged 72); Gidea Park, Essex, England
- Batting: Right-handed
- Bowling: Left-arm fast-medium

Domestic team information
- Years: Team
- 1948-49 to 1951-52: Assam

Career statistics
Competition	First-class
Matches	5
Runs scored	302
Batting average	30.20
100s/50s	1/1
Top score	148
Balls bowled	1057
Wickets	19
Bowling average	25.68
5 wickets in innings	1
10 wickets in match	1
Best bowling	7/70
Catches/stumpings	1/–
- Source: Cricinfo, 21 December 2017

Peter Warner Bullock (6 January 1925 – 16 February 1997) was an English cricketer who played first-class cricket for Assam in India from 1948 to 1952.

After World War II, Peter Bullock worked as a tea planter on the Kellyden Tea Estate in northern Assam. In cricket he was an opening or number three batsman and an opening bowler. He played in Assam’s first first-class match, when they played United Provinces in the 1948-49 Ranji Trophy. He scored 78 out of 153 in the first innings and took three wickets. He captained Assam to their first victory in first-class cricket, when they defeated Orissa in 1951-52; he top-scored in each innings with 31 and 148, and took 7 for 70 and 3 for 29 (match figures of 70.1–27–99–10).
