= Arup Das =

Indian cricketer (born 1991)

Personal information
- Full name: Arup Kamalkanta Das
- Born: 27 July 1991 (age 35); Barpeta, Assam, India
- Batting: Right-handed
- Bowling: Right-arm fast-medium
- Role: Bowler

Domestic team information
- Years: Team
- 2008/09–2021/22: Assam
- Source: CricketArchive, 9 August 2025

Arup Kamalkanta Das (born 27 July 1991) is an Indian cricketer who plays for Assam in the domestic cricket. He is a right-arm fast-medium bowler. Das made his first-class debut against Jharkhand at Dhanbad in 2011–12 Ranji Trophy. In the quarter-finals of the 2015–16 Ranji Trophy he took 8 wickets for 83 runs.

He was the joint-leading wicket-taker for Assam in the 2017–18 Ranji Trophy, with twelve dismissals in four matches.
