= Amal Das =

Indian cricketer (born 1958)

Personal information
- Born: 1 February 1958 (age 68); Gauhati (now Guwahati), India
- Batting: Right-handed
- Bowling: Right-arm offbreak

Domestic team information
- Years: Team
- 1972/73–1991/92: Assam
- Source: ESPNcricinfo, 26 May 2019

Amal Das (born 1 February 1958) is a former Indian cricketer. He played 45 first-class matches for Assam. Das was a right-handed batsman and a right-arm offbreak bowler. In May 2019, Das became the chairman of the senior selection committee of the Assam Cricket Association.
