= Javed Zaman (Indian cricketer) =

Indian cricketer (born 1976)

Personal information
- Born: 8 August 1976 (age 50); Dhubri, Assam, India
- Batting: Right-handed
- Bowling: Right-arm medium
- Role: Bowler

Domestic team information
- Years: Team
- 1993/94 – 2004/05: Assam
- Railways
- Source: ESPNcricinfo, 31 August 2016

Javed Zaman (Bengali: জাভেদ জ়ামান, Bengali pronunciation: [dʒabʱed zaman]; born 8 August 1976) is an Indian first-class cricketer from Assam who played for Assam and Railways. He is a right-handed batsman and right-arm medium pace bowler. He is considered to be one of Assam's greatest fast bowlers.

== Domestic career ==
Zaman made his debut for Assam in 1993/94 Ranji season. Zaman appeared in 47 first class matches and took 122 wickets at an average of 30.07 and economy of 2.83 with a best of 7/87 in an innings.
