= Parag Das =

Indian cricketer (born 1976)

Personal information
- Full name: Parag Kumar Das
- Born: 29 October 1976 (age 50); Gauhati, Assam, India
- Batting: Right-handed
- Bowling: Right-arm medium
- Role: Batsman
- Relatives: Riyan Parag (son)

Domestic team information
- Years: Team
- 1993/94–2008: Assam
- Source: ESPNcricinfo, 5 September 2016

Parag Das (born 29 October 1976) is a former first-class cricketer who has represented Assam, Railways and East Zone cricket team. He is a right-handed batsman who bowled right-arm medium pace. Das made his first-class debut for Assam in the 1993/94 Ranji Trophy. He played 43 first-class matches with highest score of 118 and 32 List A matches. He was born in Guwahati, Assam.

After being absorbed by NF Railway, the very next season Parag Das also led the under-25 Railways team.

His son Riyan Parag, is a senior Indian Cricketer and is now the captain of Rajasthan Royals in the Indian Premier League. He also represents Assam in all formats of the game and Parag Das had played a great role in giving necessary training to his son Riyan since his childhood.
