= Mark Ingty =

Indian cricketer (born 1976)

Personal information
- Full name: Mark Julien Vernon Ingty
- Born: 16 September 1976 (age 50); Shillong, Meghalaya
- Source: ESPNcricinfo, 11 October 2018

Mark Ingty (born 16 September 1976) is an Indian cricketer. He has played List A cricket since 2000 and first-class cricket since 2001. In September 2018, he was named in Meghalaya's squad for the 2018–19 Vijay Hazare Trophy. He made his Twenty20 debut on 9 November 2019, for Meghalaya in the 2019–20 Syed Mushtaq Ali Trophy.
