= Pritam Das =

Indian cricketer (born 1988)

Personal information
- Full name: Pritam Laru Das
- Born: 16 October 1988 (age 37); Silchar, Assam, India
- Batting: Right-handed
- Bowling: Right-arm fast-medium
- Role: Bowler

Domestic team information
- Years: Team
- 2006/07–2021/22: Assam
- 2008/09: Royal Bengal Tigers
- Source: ESPNcricinfo, 8 August 2025

Pritam Das (Bengali: প্রীতম দাস, Bengali pronunciation: [pritom das]; born 16 October 1988) is an Indian cricketer who played for Assam in domestic cricket. He took retirement from cricket in June 2024 announcing it via a post in Facebook on his profile. He also holds a post of PA in Department of Posts, Govt of India through sports and he's presently focused in job after retirement from active cricket

Das is a right-arm fast-medium bowler, born in Silchar, Assam. He made his first-class debut during the 2006–07 Ranji Trophy competition, against Odisha in January 2007. He took 5 for 65 in the first innings.

The following month, Das made List A debut in the Vijay Hazare Trophy match against Orissa. In April 2007, he made appearances for Assam in the Inter State Twenty20 tournament. He also represented the Royal Bengal Tigers in now defunct Twenty 20 league ICL. He took most wickets in the 2012–13 Vijay Hazare Trophy, India's domestic 50 over tournament.

In 2019–20 as well, he was the joint-leading wicket-taker in the Vijay Hazare Trophy tournament, with twenty-three dismissals in nine matches.

He took retirement from cricket on 15 June 2024 and bid farewell in a post on Facebook
