= Pallavkumar Das =

Indian cricketer (born 1990)

Personal information
- Full name: Pallavkumar Prasanta Das
- Born: 17 January 1990 (age 36); Dewshipara, Assam, India
- Batting: Left-handed
- Bowling: Right-arm medium
- Role: Batsman

Domestic team information
- Years: Team
- 2011–present: Assam
- Source: Cricinfo, 4 October 2015

Pallavkumar Prasanta Das (born 17 January 1990) is an Indian cricketer who plays for Assam in domestic cricket. He is a left-handed opening batsman. Das made his first class debut on 29 November 2011 against Jharkhand at Dhanbad in the 2011–12 Ranji Trophy.
