= Vikramjeet Malik =

Indian cricketer (born 1983)

Personal information
- Full name: Vikramjeet Singh Malik
- Born: 9 May 1983 (age 43); Visakhapatnam, Andhra Pradesh, India
- Batting: Right-handed
- Bowling: Right-arm medium
- Role: Bowler

Domestic team information
- Years: Team
- 2002/03–2014/15: Himachal Pradesh
- 2009–2012: Kings XI Punjab
- 2013–2015: Rajasthan Royals

Career statistics
Competition	FC	LA	T20
Matches	81	53	41
Runs scored	1,159	298	189
Batting average	13.63	10.27	12.60
100s/50s	0/3	0/0	0/0
Top score	83	33	48
Balls bowled	15,996	2,727	827
Wickets	308	64	44
Bowling average	23.42	31.98	23.00
5 wickets in innings	15	0	0
10 wickets in match	2	0	0
Best bowling	7/29	4/35	3/18
Catches/stumpings	14/–	15/–	5/–
- Source: ESPNcricinfo, 25 February 2025

Vikramjeet Malik (born 9 May 1983) is an Indian former cricketer who played for Himachal Pradesh in domestic cricket primarily as a medium-pace bowler.

Although he has been playing domestic cricket for a decade now, it was only a couple of seasons ago that he got noticed. In the 2009–10 season, he picked up 32 wickets from seven matches and finished among the top four bowlers in the Ranji Trophy.

He was part of Kings XI Punjab since IPL 2008 and was signed up by Rajasthan Royals in 2013.
