= Parvez Aziz =

Indian cricketer (born 1987)

Personal information
- Full name: Parvez Aziz
- Born: 8 December 1987 (age 38); Guwahati, Assam, India
- Batting: Left-handed
- Bowling: Slow left-arm orthodox
- Role: Opening batsman

Domestic team information
- Years: Team
- 2004–present: Assam
- 2007–2008: Ahmedabad Rockets
- 2007: Royal Bengal Tigers
- Source: ESPNcricinfo, 18 May 2016

Parvez Aziz (born 8 December 1987) is an Indian cricketer who plays for Assam cricket team. He also represented the India under 19 team during 2006 and Ahmedabad Rockets in now defunct ICL. He is a left-handed opening batsman who can bowls slow left-arm orthodox balls. Aziz made his first-class debut on 7 November 2004 against Baroda at Guwahati in the 2004–05 Ranji Trophy and List A debut on 15 January 2005 against Bengal at Kolkata in the Ranji One-Day Trophy.
