= Rupert Kettle (cricketer) =

English cricketer

Personal information
- Full name: Rupert Francis Kettle
- Born: 16 February 1915; Worcester, England
- Died: 11 December 1985 (aged 70); Surrey, England

Domestic team information
- Years: Team
- 1944-45 to 1950-51: Assam

Career statistics
Competition	First-class
Matches	3
Runs scored	133
Batting average	33.25
100s/50s	1/0
Top score	106 not out
Balls bowled	150
Wickets	2
Bowling average	68.50
5 wickets in innings	0
10 wickets in match	0
Best bowling	2/51
Catches/stumpings	1/–
- Source: Cricinfo, 21 July 2018

Rupert Francis Kettle (16 February 1915 – 11 December 1985) was an English cricketer who played three matches of first-class cricket in India between 1944 and 1951. He was the first captain and the first century-maker for Assam.

== Life and career ==
Born in Worcester, Rupert Kettle served in the Gloucestershire Regiment in the Second World War. While stationed in India in 1944 he played a first-class match, staged in aid of the Red Cross Fund, for a Services XI that included several English first-class cricketers and three Test cricketers.

He spent several years in Assam after the war, working as a tea broker. He captained Assam's cricket team in their debut season in the Ranji Trophy in 1948-49, when they played one match, losing by an innings to United Provinces. In his second and final match for Assam, which was Assam's third first-class match, two seasons later, he scored Assam's first first-class century. Going to the wicket in the first innings with the score at 15 for 6, he made 106 not out in a team total of 175, adding 79 in a last-wicket partnership. Assam nevertheless lost by an innings again.
