= Zakaria Zuffri =

Indian cricketer (born 1975)

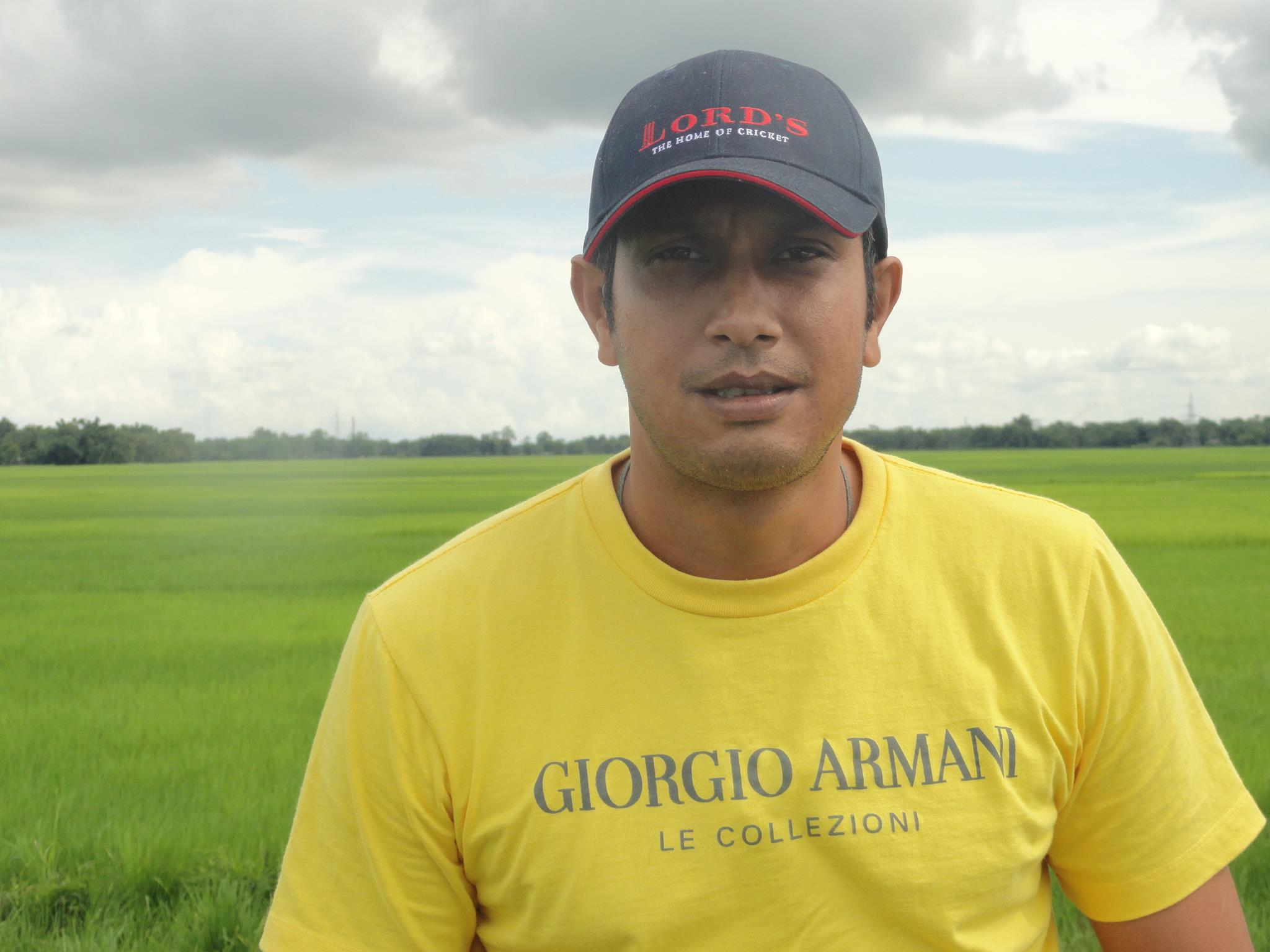

Personal information
- Full name: Syed Zakaria Zuffri
- Born: 12 October 1975 (age 51); Gauhati, Assam
- Batting: Left-handed
- Role: Wicket-keeper batsman,

Domestic team information
- Years: Team
- 1992–2007: Assam
- 1995–1999: Railways
- 2007/08: Hyderabad Heroes
- Source: ESPNcricinfo, 26 May 2016

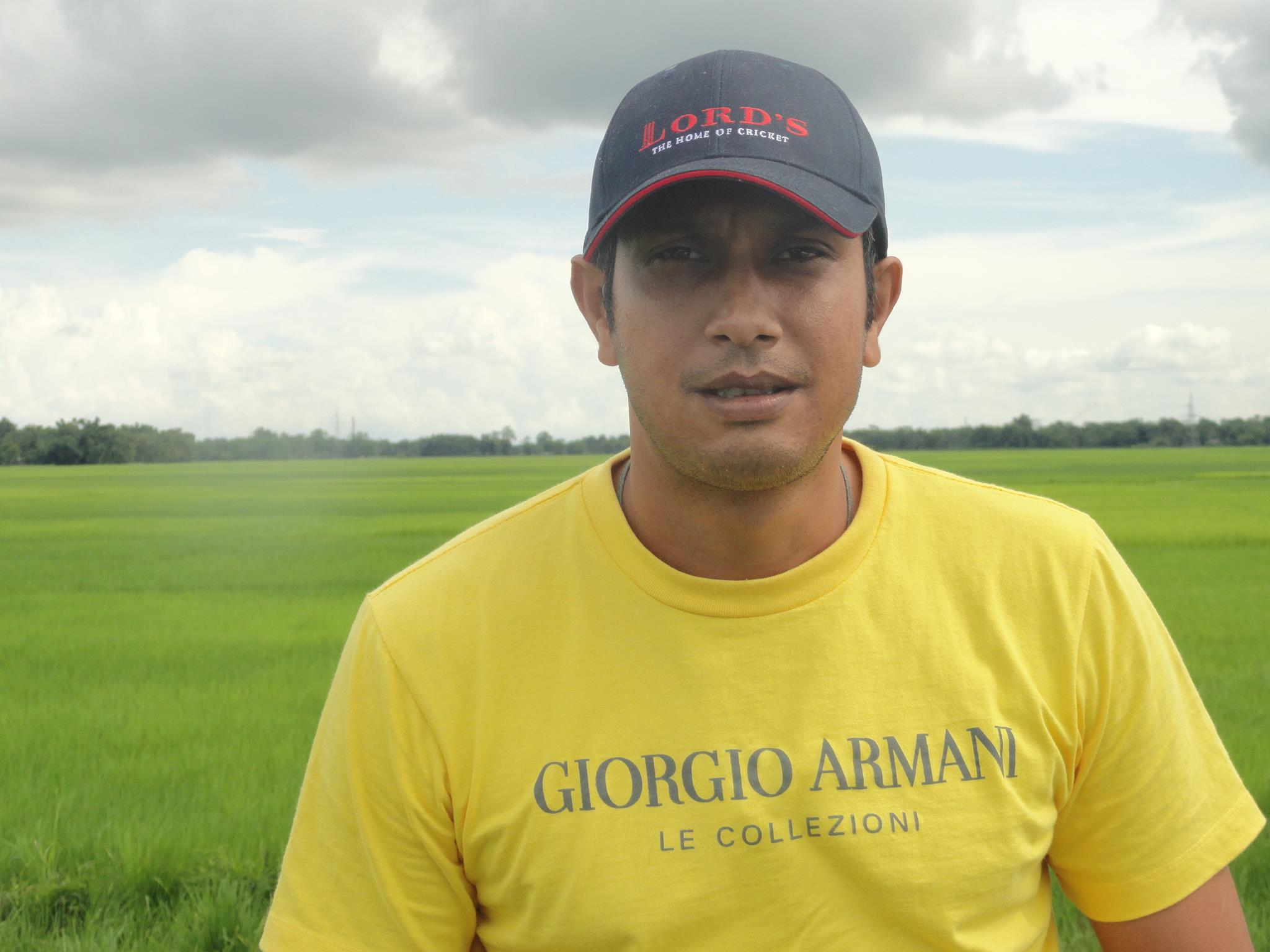
Zakaria Zuffri

Syed Zakaria Zuffri (born 12 October 1975) is a former Indian first-class cricketer who played for Assam and Railways in the Ranji Trophy. He was a left-handed wicket-keeper batsman. He was CEO of Bangladesh Premier League.

Zuffri became the head coach of Assam cricket team ahead of the 2018/19 Ranji season.
