= Anup Ghatak =

Indian cricketer (1941–2013)

Personal information
- Born: 1941
- Died: 26 September 2013 (aged 71–72)

Domestic team information
- Years: Team
- 1963-1977: Assam
- Source: ESPNcricinfo, 9 December 2014

Anup Ghatak (1941 – 26 September 2013) was an Indian cricketer. He played for Assam between 1963 and 1977. He was the first player to take 100 wickets for Assam in first-class cricket.
