= Arlen Konwar =

Indian cricketer (born 1981)

Personal information
- Born: 1 January 1981 (age 45); Sibsagar, Assam, India
- Nickname: Arlie
- Batting: Right-handed
- Bowling: Right-arm off break
- Role: Bowler

Domestic team information
- Years: Team
- 2001/02–2014/15: Assam
- Source: ESPNcricinfo, 5 August 2016

Arlen Konwar (born 1 January 1981) is an Indian cricketer from Assam. He made his debut in first-class cricket for Assam in 2001–02 Ranji Trophy. He is a right-arm off break bowler. Konwar is the best spin bowler Assam has ever produced. He is the highest wicket taker of Assam in first class cricket with more than 200 wickets.
