= Swarupam Purkayastha =

Indian cricketer

Personal information
- Full name: Swarupam Purkayastha
- Born: 15 September 1989 (age 37); Guwahati, Assam, India
- Batting: Right-handed
- Bowling: Right-arm off break
- Role: All-rounder

Domestic team information
- Years: Team
- 2008–present: Assam

Career statistics
Competition	FC	LA	T20
Matches	41	40	26
Runs scored	1754	1071	147
Batting average	28.29	32.26	8.64
100s/50s	2/8	3/2	0/0
Top score	113	163*	27*
Balls bowled	3,890	1059	255
Wickets	70	14	15
Bowling average	30.60	64.85	24.20
5 wickets in innings	6	0	0
10 wickets in match	2	0	0
Best bowling	8/29	2/27	3/17
Catches/stumpings	12/–	12/–	5/–
- Source: Cricinfo, 6 January 2023

Swarupam Purkayastha (born 15 September 1989) is an Indian cricketer who plays for Assam in domestic cricket. He is a bowling all-rounder who bats right-handed, and bowls right-arm off break. He played for Assam at different age-levels such as Under-14, Under-16 and Under-19, before making his first-class debut in 2008. Between 2008 and 2010, Purkayastha played six first-class matches, eight List A matches and four Twenty20 matches. He did not play top level cricket for another four years.

In November 2014, Purkayastha returned to the Assam team during the 2014–15 Vijay Hazare Trophy. He was included in the squad for the 2014–15 Ranji Trophy. In his first match of the Ranji Trophy of the season, he picked no wickets. In his next game against Services, he did not bowl in the first innings and picked 5/29 in the second innings. He had figures of 5/59 and 8/29 against Hyderabad at Hyderabad in his third match. This bowling performance gave Assam an innings win and was his first ten-wicket haul for which he won the man of the match award. In his fourth match of the season, he picked 5/69 and 6/76 against Goa at Porvorim. Assam won the match by 10 wickets and Purkayastha won his second man of the match. In his fifth match, against Andhra, Purkayastha's all-round performance (3/35, 108*, 3/69) earned him his third straight man of the match award and helped Assam register another 10-wicket victory.
