= Sibsankar Roy (cricketer) =

Indian cricketer (born 1990)

Personal information
- Full name: Sibsankar Arabinda Roy
- Born: 10 October 1990 (age 36); Guwahati, Assam, India
- Nickname: Sibu
- Batting: Left-handed
- Bowling: Right-arm off break
- Role: Batter

Domestic team information
- Years: Team
- 2008–present: Assam
- Source: Cricinfo, 5 October 2015

Sibsankar Arabinda Roy (born 10 October 1990) is an Indian cricketer. He is a left-handed batter and a right-arm off-break bowler who plays for Assam in domestic cricket.

== Career ==
Roy was born in Guwahati. He began his cricketing career in the youth ranks of Assam, in the 2001-02 National Under-14s tournament, aged just eleven. He moved up to the Under-15s team the following year, for whom he played for two consecutive seasons.

Roy started 2004–05 with the Under-19s team before moving to the Under-17s, moving back to the Under-19s in 2005–06. Roy maintained his position in the Under-19s in 2006–07, and played a couple of games for the Under-22s in 2007–08, before making his step up to the first team.

Roy made his List A debut for Assam in the 2007-08 Vijay Hazare Trophy against Orissa, scoring 35 runs in a narrow defeat. Roy's first-class debut followed the following season, making his debut in the second round of fixtures, against Tripura in the 2008–09 Ranji Trophy. He has played for East Zone and India Blue in the 2012–13 Deodhar Trophy and NKP Salve Challenger Trophy 2013-14 respectively.
