= Dhiraj Goswami =

Indian cricketer (born 1985)

Personal information
- Full name: Dhiraj Satyen Goswami
- Born: 1 May 1985 (age 41); Nagaon, Assam, India
- Batting: Right-handed
- Bowling: Right-arm medium
- Role: All-rounder

Domestic team information
- Years: Team
- 2002/03–present: Assam
- Source: ESPNcricinfo, 5 August 2016

Dhiraj Goswami (born 1 May 1985) is an Indian cricketer who plays for Assam in domestic cricket. He is a right-handed batsman and right-arm medium pace bowler. Goswami is a bowling all-rounder. He made his first-class debut in the 2002–03 Ranji Trophy.
