= Denish Das =

Indian cricketer (born 2002)

Personal information
- Full name: Denish Paramananda Das
- Born: 17 May 2002 (age 24); Guwahati, Assam, India
- Batting: Right-handed
- Bowling: Right-arm Legbreak
- Role: Batter

Domestic team information
- Years: Team
- 2022–present: Assam

Career statistics
Competition	FC	LA	T20
Matches	25	29	32
Runs scored	1266	810	478
Batting average	29.4	30.00	15.4
100s/50s	4/6	0/7	0/1
Top score	109	85	63
Balls bowled	-	215	-
Wickets	-	7	-
Bowling average	-	24.00	-
5 wickets in innings	-	0	-
10 wickets in match	-	0	-
Best bowling	-	0	-
Catches/stumpings	-		-
- Source: Cricinfo, 15 November 2026

Denish Paramananda Das (born 17 May 2002) is an Indian first-class cricketer who plays for Assam in domestic cricket. He is the skipper of Assam cricket team for Ranji Trophy.

Das is a middle-order batter. He made his first-class debut against Vidarbha at Rohtak in the 2022–23 Ranji Trophy. Das scored his first century in a First Class match against Tamil Nadu in Ranji Trophy match at Barsapara Cricket Stadium.
