= Gautam Dutta =

Indian cricketer (born 1973)

Personal information
- Full name: Gautam Dutta
- Born: 28 October 1973 (age 53); Gauhati (now Guwahati), Assam, India
- Batting: Left-handed
- Bowling: Left-arm medium
- Role: All-rounder

Domestic team information
- Years: Team
- 1989/90–2004/05: Assam
- Source: ESPNcricinfo, 7 August 2016

Gautam Dutta (born 28 October 1973) is an Indian first-class cricketer from Assam. He made his debut for Assam in 1989/90 Ranji Trophy. He is a left-handed batsman and left-arm medium pace bowler. A fast bowling all-rounder, Dutta was Assam and East Zone's strike bowler during late 1990s and early 2000s. In 53 first class matches, Dutta took 142 wickets at an average of 24.35 and economy of 2.73 with a best of 9/52 in an innings. He also scored many crucial runs for the teams he played including 8 fifties. He was also a member of India under-19 team during 1991/92.
