= Subhrajit Saikia =

Indian cricketer (born 1974)

Personal information
- Full name: Subhrajit Badan Saikia
- Born: 9 December 1974 (age 51); Dibrugarh, Assam, India
- Batting: Left-handed
- Bowling: Right-arm medium
- Role: Batsman

Domestic team information
- Years: Team
- 1993/94–2001/02: Assam
- Source: ESPNcricinfo, 23 May 2019

Subhrajit Saikia (born 9 December 1974) is a former Indian cricketer who played domestic cricket for Assam cricket team. He is a left-handed batsman who bowled right-arm medium pace. Saikia made his first-class debut for Assam in the 1993/94 season of Ranji Trophy. He played 43 first-class matches with highest score of 127 and 29 List A matches.
