= Abu Nechim =

Indian cricketer (born 1988)

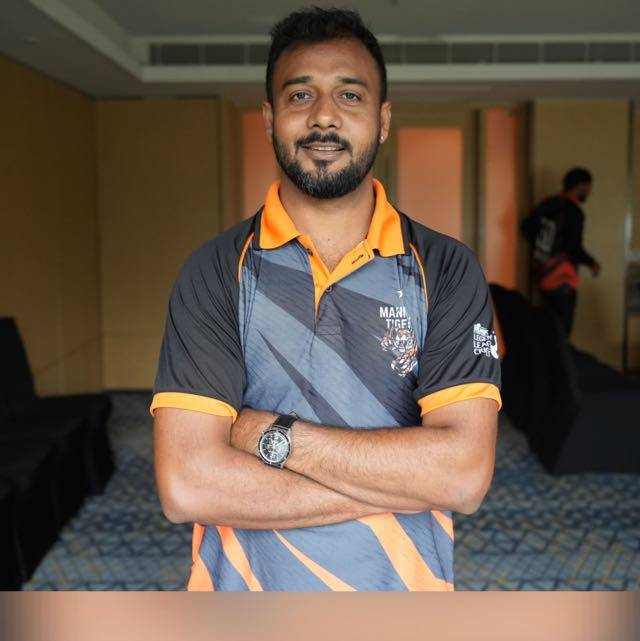
- Nechim in 2024

Personal information
- Full name: Abu Nechim Ahmed
- Born: 5 November 1988 (age 38); Guwahati, Assam, India
- Batting: Right-handed
- Bowling: Right-arm fast-medium
- Role: Bowler

Domestic team information
- Years: Team
- 2005–2021: Assam
- 2010–2013: Mumbai Indians
- 2014–2016: Royal Challengers Bangalore
- 2021–2023: Nagaland

Career statistics
Competition	FC	LA	T20
Matches	64	56	75
Runs scored	1,114	421	239
Batting average	13.75	14.03	9.19
100s/50s	0/1	0/0	0/0
Top score	50	43	26*
Balls bowled	10,810	2,378	1,435
Wickets	167	59	75
Bowling average	32.04	34.88	24.29
5 wickets in innings	6	1	0
10 wickets in match	1	0	0
Best bowling	7/68	5/32	4/21
Catches/stumpings	23/–	13/–	1/–
- Source: ESPNcricinfo, 18 March 2021

Abu Nechim Ahmed (born 5 November 1988) is an Indian cricketer who plays for Assam in domestic cricket and played for Royal Challengers Bangalore and Mumbai Indians in the Indian Premier League. He is a right-arm fast bowler and right-handed lower order batsman. He captained Assam cricket team in the Ranji Trophy, Vijay Hazare Trophy and Syed Mushtaq Ali Trophy.

== Career ==
Abu made his first-class debut for Assam, on 1 December 2005 against Madhya Pradesh at Indore in the 2005–06 Ranji Trophy. From 2010 to 2013 he represented Mumbai Indians in the Indian Premier League. He has represented India at the U-19 level many times, played in the 2006 U-19 Cricket World Cup in Sri Lanka. He had also represented ICL India XI & Royal Bengal Tigers in the now defunct ICL.

He was the joint-leading wicket-taker for Assam in the 2017–18 Ranji Trophy, with twelve dismissals in four matches.

Abu Nechim retired from all formats of cricket in February 2023.
