= Lalchand Rajput =

Indian cricketer and coach

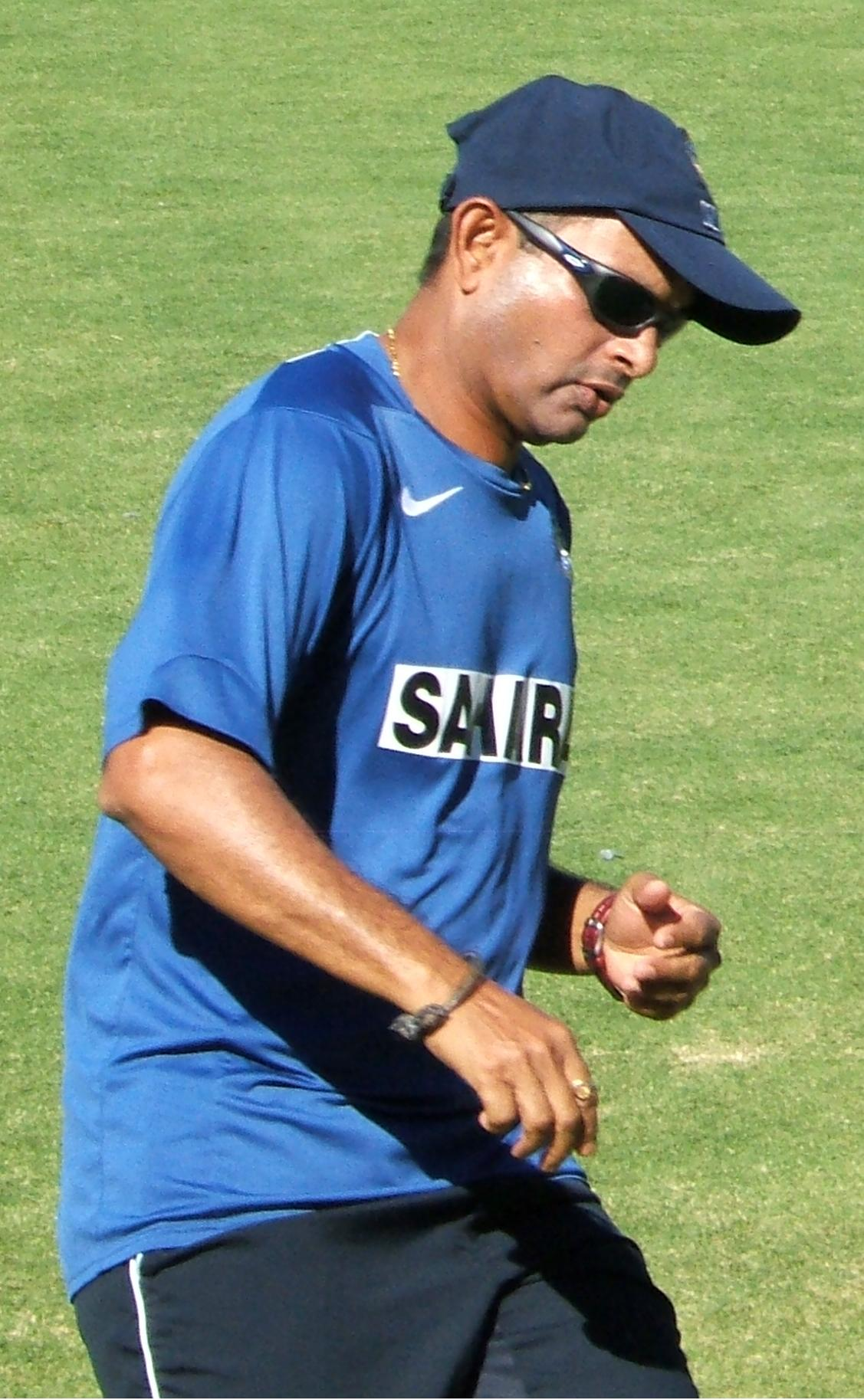

Personal information
- Full name: Lalchand Sitaram Rajput
- Born: 18 December 1961 (age 64); Bombay, Maharashtra, India
- Batting: Right-handed
- Role: Batsman
- Relatives: Akhil Rajput (son)

International information
- National side: India
- Test debut (cap 171): 10 August 1985 v Sri Lanka
- Last Test: 6 September 1985 v Sri Lanka
- ODI debut (cap 53): 23 January 1985 v England
- Last ODI: 24 March 1987 v Pakistan

Head coaching information
- Years: Team
- 2007–2008: India
- 2016–2017: Afghanistan
- 2018–2022: Zimbabwe
- 2024–present: United Arab Emirates

Career statistics
Competition	Test	ODI	FC	LA
Matches	2	4	110	61
Runs scored	105	9	7,988	1,965
Batting average	26.25	3.00	49.30	35.72
100s/50s	0/1	0/0	20/46	3/15
Top score	61	8	275	115
Balls bowled	–	42	5,696	1,898
Wickets	–	0	59	31
Bowling average	–	–	45.22	45.12
5 wickets in innings	–	–	1	0
10 wickets in match	–	–	0	0
Best bowling	–	–	5/32	3/46
Catches/stumpings	1/–	2/–	79/–	21/–
Medal record
Men's Cricket
Representing India as Coach
ICC T20 World Cup
Winner	2007 South Africa
- Source: Cricinfo, 4 February 2006

Lalchand Sitaram Rajput; (born 18 December 1961) is an Indian cricket coach and former cricketer. He was appointed head coach of the United Arab Emirates national cricket team in 2024.

Rajput played in two Tests and four ODIs from 1985 to 1987. He took up coaching after the conclusion of his playing career and has also held administrative positions with the Mumbai Cricket Association. He has served as head coach of India (2007–2008), Afghanistan (2016–2017), Zimbabwe (2018–2022) and the United Arab Emirates (2024–present). He was appointed Manager of the Indian team at the 2007 ICC World Twenty20, which he led the team to be the maiden champions of the tournament.

== Playing career ==
Rajput had a distinguished career as an opening batsman for Bombay, and at one time was considered one of the best openers in India after Sunil Gavaskar. However, he did not translate his promise and success at the domestic level to the international arena, in the limited opportunities he had. He was an occasional off-spinner.

== Coaching career ==
Rajput attended a coaching clinic held at Bangalore in April 2007. He was coach of Under-19 Indian Cricket Team during the tour of England. Rajput was appointed as the manager of the World Cup winning Indian cricket team for the 2007 Twenty20 World Championship held in South Africa.

Rajput was the coach of the Mumbai Indians in the Indian Premier League 2008. He was caught on camera laughing when Harbhajan Singh slapped Sreesanth after a match between Mumbai Indians and Kings XI Punjab. The BCCI stated that it was shameful that Rajput was laughing on witnessing the incident. It was expected that BCCI would take strong action against Rajput.

In June 2016, Rajput was named as head coach of Afghanistan's national team, replacing Pakistan's Inzamam ul Haq; during his spell in charge, they defeated West Indies in a one-day international at Gros Islet and were promoted to full membership of the International Cricket Council. But the Afghan board ended his contract in August 2017; he was later replaced by Phil Simmons..

In May 2018, he was named as the interim head coach of the Zimbabwe national cricket team. In August 2018, he was appointed to the role on a permanent basis. In June 2019, he was named as the coach of the Winnipeg Hawks franchise team for the 2019 Global T20 Canada tournament.

In March 2022, Zimbabwe Cricket extended Rajput's contract and he served Zimbabwe up until early June 2022. Following the conclusion of Zimbabwe's home series against Afghanistan, he was replaced by Dave Houghton as the new head coach of Zimbabwe.

Rajput was appointed head coach of the United Arab Emirates national cricket team in February 2024. He signed a three-year contract with the 2024 ICC Men's T20 World Cup as his first major tournament in charge of the team.
