= Dheeraj Jadhav =

Indian cricketer (born 1979)

Personal information
- Full name: Dheeraj Subash Jadhav
- Born: 16 September 1979 (age 47); Malegaon, Maharashtra
- Batting: Left-handed
- Bowling: Right-arm offbreak
- Role: Opening Batsman

Domestic team information
- Years: Team
- 1999/00–2006/07: Maharashtra
- 2008/09–present: Assam
- 2006–2008: Mumbai Champs

Career statistics
| Competition | FC | List A | T20 |
|---|---|---|---|
| Matches | 76 | 37 | 14 |
| Runs scored | 5831 | 1559 | 275 |
| Batting average | 56.06 | 47.24 | 25.00 |
| 100s/50s | 20/18 | 3/11 | 0/1 |
| Top score | 260* | 148* | 69* |
| Balls bowled | 60 | – | 12 |
| Wickets | 0 | – | 0 |
| Bowling average | – | – | – |
| 5 wickets in innings | – | – | – |
| 10 wickets in match | – | – | – |
| Best bowling | – | – | – |
| Catches/stumpings | 51/– | 18/– | 3/– |
- Source: ESPNcricinfo, 3 May 2012

Dheeraj Jadhav (born 16 September 1979), is an Indian cricketer who currently plays for Assam. He has represented Mumbai Champs in the Indian Cricket League and Maharashtra in domestic cricket. Although he used to bat in the middle order, he later became a stroke-playing opening batsman which produced immediate results. After good performances for India A, including a century in an India v India A game he was called up into the Test squad for the 4th Test vs Australia at Mumbai in 2004. After 52 First Class games, he has achieved an impressive average of 52 with a highest score of 260 not out.

In 2011, Dheeraj signed to play for Pune Warriors India in the 2011 Indian Premier League cricket tournament,

Dheeraj signed a contract to play cricket in England in 2008, 2009 & 2010 for Horwich R.M.I. Cricket Club in the Bolton Cricket League.

Dheeraj had a successful first season at Horwich RMI. He scored 939 runs in just 15 innings, averaging over 85 runs per innings. He also broke the club record for the most runs scored in a single innings, with his 164 not out against Bradshaw Cricket Club.
