= Rajesh Borah =

Indian former first-class cricketer

Personal information
- Full name: Rajesh Kumar Borah
- Born: 14 November 1967 (age 58); Tezpur, Assam, India
- Batting: Right-handed
- Bowling: Right-arm off break

Domestic team information
- Years: Team
- 1983/84–2000/01: Assam
- 1994/95–1995/96: Railways

Career statistics
Competition	FC	List A
Matches	66	34
Runs scored	3,447	466
Batting average	31.62	15.03
100s/50s	5/17	0/1
Top score	235	61
Balls bowled	2,469	614
Wickets	28	16
Bowling average	45.28	31.37
5 wickets in innings	0	0
10 wickets in match	0	n/a
Best bowling	4/110	4/16
Catches/stumpings	36/–	15/–
- Source: ESPNcricinfo, 17 May 2016

Rajesh Kumar Borah (born 14 November 1967) is an Indian former first-class cricketer who represented Assam and Railways. He was regarded as "perhaps the finest cricketer Assam has produced." After his playing career, he worked as a coach.

== Life and career ==
A right-handed batsman and right-arm off break bowler, Borah made his first-class debut in 1983 at the age of 16 and represented India Under-19s in the 1986/87 season. He appeared for Assam between 1983/84 and 2000/01 as well as for Railways for two seasons. In 1988, he struck 126 off 62 balls against Tripura in the Ranji Trophy, which is one of the fastest hundreds in Indian domestic cricket. In 66 first-class matches, he amassed more than 3000 runs and took 28 wickets with his part-time bowling. He also appeared for East Zone in Duleep Trophy and Deodhar Trophy.

Borah worked as the coach of Assam during the 2000–01 Ranji Trophy when the team managed to earn qualification for the Elite Group. He then worked as the chief coach at the Assam Cricket Academy. He was appointed as the head coach of Assam for a second time before the 2008–09 season. In 2008, Borah also became a member of the national junior team selection committee.

Currently, he is serving as an Assistant Sports Officer in Indian Railways.
