= Assam cricket team =

Indian cricket team

Personnel
- Captain: Denish Das (FC); Sumit Ghadigaonkar (LA); Sumit Ghadigaonkar (T20)
- Coach: Kiran Powar
- Owner: Assam Cricket Association

Team information
- Colours: Dark Green Yellow
- Founded: 1948
- Home ground: Assam Cricket Association Stadium, Guwahati
- Capacity: 40,000
- Secondary home ground(s): Nehru Stadium; Amingaon Cricket Ground
- Secondary ground capacity: 15,000; NA

History
- First-class debut: United Provinces in 1948 at Garrison Ground, Shillong
- Ranji Trophy wins: 0
- Vijay Hazare Trophy wins: 0
- Syed Mushtaq Ali Trophy wins: 0
- Official website: www.assamcricket.com

The Assam cricket team is a domestic cricket team represents the Indian state of Assam, run by the Assam Cricket Association. The team competes in the first-class tournament Ranji Trophy, limited-overs tournament Vijay Hazare Trophy and the Twenty20, Syed Mushtaq Ali Trophy.

== History ==
Assam played their first first-class match in the 1948–49 Ranji Trophy, captained by Rupert Kettle, who also scored their first century two seasons later. They had their first victory in the 1951–52 Ranji Trophy, when they beat Orissa by 103 runs; the captain, Peter Bullock, top-scored in each innings with 31 and 148, and took 7 for 70 and 3 for 29.

Until the 2002–03 season, when the zonal system was abandoned, Assam formed part of East Zone, and never progressed further than the pre-quarter-finals. They won their plate group in 2006/07 before losing the semi-final to Orissa. In the 2009–10 season Assam entered the elite group of the Ranji Trophy, and topped the plate group and subsequently progressed to the Super League. However, in the 2010–11 season, they ended at the bottom of their group in the Super League and were relegated to the Plate League for the next season. In the 2012–13 Vijay Hazare Trophy Assam played extremely well and finished runners-up. In the 2014–15 Ranji season Assam were again promoted to Group A level. In the 2015–16 Ranji Trophy, the team reached the semi-final for the first time in their history.

In September 2017, former Indian batsman Lalchand Rajput was named as head coach of Assam cricket team for two Ranji Trophy seasons.

Assam's best finish in Syed Mushtaq Ali Trophy came in the 2023–24 season under the captaincy of Riyan Parag reaching the semi-finals. Riyan Parag had a record run of seven consecutive fifties in that season.

== Honours ==
- Vijay Hazare Trophy
  - Runners-up: 2012–13

== Home grounds ==
- Assam Cricket Association Stadium, Barsapara, Guwahati
- Nehru Stadium, Guwahati, Hosted 14 ODIs.
- Amingaon Cricket Ground, Amingaon
- Northeast Frontier Railway Stadium, Maligaon, Guwahati
- Satindra Mohan Dev Stadium, Silchar
- Jalan Outdoor Stadium, Dibrugarh

Since Assam played its first home match in 1948, it has also played first-class home matches in Shillong, Jorhat, Nagaon, Karimganj, Hailakandi, Mangaldoi and Tinsukia.

== Notable players ==
Players capped for Assam who have played International Cricket, along with year of debut:

- Riyan Parag (2024)

Prominent players at the domestic level:

- Amalendu Guha Roy (1948-1963)
- Abani Hazarika (1951-1971)
- Madhurya Barua (1957-1972)
- Anup Ghatak (1963-1976)
- Probir Hazarika (1968-1974)
- Amal Das (1972-1991)
- Munna Kakoti (1975-1992)
- Rajesh Borah (1983-2001)
- Rajinder Singh (1988-1998)
- Gautam Dutta (1989-2004)
- Zakaria Zuffri (1992-2007)
- Subhrajit Saikia (1994-2004)
- Parag Das (1994-2008)
- Nishanta Bordoloi (1994-2008)
- Arlen Konwar (2001-2015)
- Parvez Aziz (2004-2019)
- Gokul Sharma (2004-2024)
- Abu Nechim (2005-2021)
- Kunal Saikia (2006-2023)
- Pritam Das (2007-2021)
- Swarupam Purkayastha (2008-present)
- Sibsankar Roy (2008-present)
- Arup Das (2009-2022)
- Pallavkumar Das (2011-2023)
- Rishav Das (2013-present)

India Capped players from other states who played for Assam, along with year:

- Lalchand Rajput (1991-1993)
- Chandrakant Pandit (1992-1993)
- Sadagoppan Ramesh (2007-2008)
- Jacob Martin (2008-2009)
- Sairaj Bahutule (2009-2010)
- Sridharan Sriram (2010)

== Current squad ==
Players with international cap are listed in bold.

Name	Birth date	Batting style	Bowling style	Notes
Batters
Sibsankar Roy	10 October 1990 (age 36)	Left-handed	Right-arm off break	
Denish Das	17 May 2002 (age 24)	Right-handed	Right-arm leg break	**First-class Captain**
Pradyun Saikia	17 January 2003 (age 23)	Left-handed	Right-arm off break	
Nihar Deka	15 November 2001 (age 25)	Right-handed	Right-arm off break	
Rishav Das	16 December 1989 (age 36)	Right-handed	Right-arm off break	
Saahil Jain	22 October 1998 (age 28)	Right-handed	Right-arm off break	
Jitumoni Kalita	10 October 2000 (age 26)	Right-handed	Right-arm leg break	
Rajveer Singh	9 July 2006 (age 20)	Right-handed		
Nibir Deka	15 November 2001 (age 25)	Right-handed	Right-arm off break	
All-rounders
Swarupam Purkayastha	15 September 1989 (age 37)	Right-handed	Right-arm off break	
Abdul Ajij Kuraishi		Right-handed	Right-arm medium	
Dipjyoti Saikia	16 August 2002 (age 24)	Right-handed	Right-arm medium	
Roshan Alam	20 April 1995 (age 31)	Right-handed	Slow left-arm orthodox	
Wicket-keepers
Sumit Ghadigaonkar	11 April 1992 (age 34)	Right-handed		**List A and Twenty20 Captain**
Rohit Sen	15 March 2004 (age 22)	Right-handed		
Anurag Talukdar	21 December 1997 (age 28)	Right-handed		
Spin Bowlers
Avinov Choudhury	1 December 1999 (age 26)	Right-handed	Slow left-arm orthodox	
Bhargab Lahkar	25 February 2003 (age 23)	Right-handed	Right-arm off break	
Amlanjyoti Das	15 January 2002 (age 24)	Right-handed	Right-arm off break	
Mohit Thakur	11 February 2007 (age 19)	Left-handed	Right-arm off break	
Pace Bowlers
Mukhtar Hussain	11 January 1999 (age 27)	Right-handed	Right-arm medium-fast	
Akash Sengupta	26 October 2000 (age 26)	Right-handed	Right-arm medium-fast	
Ayushman Malakar	21 October 2005 (age 21)	Right-handed	Right-arm medium	
Mrinmoy Dutta	24 November 1998 (age 27)	Left-handed	Left-arm medium	
Hridip Deka	10 October 1999 (age 27)	Right-handed	Right-arm medium	

Updated as on 16 November 2026

== Coaching staff ==
- Head coach: Kiran Powar
- Assistant coach: RK Yadav and Pritam Das
- Trainer: Bhaskar Borah
- Physio: Bheeshm Pratap Singh
- Video analyst: Rajesh Sharma
- Masseur: Hari Krishnan

== Records ==
For more details on this topic, see List of Assam first-class cricket records, List of Assam List A cricket records, List of Assam Twenty20 cricket records.

== Series in Assam ==
=== Nepal A tour of Assam 2025 ===
Nepal A toured Guwahati for a five‑match T20 series against Assam State from August 28 to September 1, 2025 .

The first two matches were daytime games at the ACA Cricket Academy Ground, while the last three were day/night fixtures at the ACA Stadium (Barsapara Cricket Stadium) .

== See also ==
- List of Assam cricketers
