= 2015–16 Ranji Trophy Group A =

2015-16 Ranji Trophy Group A
- The Ranji Trophy, awarded to the winners
- Dates: 1 October 2015 – 4 December 2015
- Administrator(s): BCCI
- Cricket format: First-class cricket
- Tournament format(s): Round-robin
- Host(s): India
- Participants: 9
- Matches: 36

The 2015–16 Ranji Trophy is the 82nd season of the Ranji Trophy, the premier first-class cricket tournament in India. It is being contested by 27 teams divided into three groups of nine teams each.

Top three teams advance to knockout stage and ninth place team will be relegated to Group C for 2016–17 Ranji Trophy.

== Squads ==
Assam	Bengal	Delhi	Haryana	Karnataka
Gokul Sharma (c); Arun Karthik (vc); Abu Nechim; Amit Verma; Bikash Chetri; Arup Das; Krishna Das; Pritam Das; Pallavkumar Das; Rishav Das; Swarupam Purkayastha; Sibsankar Roy; Kunal Saikia (wk); Jamaluddin Syed Mohammad; Tarjinder Singh	Laxmi Shukla (c); Sudip Chatterjee; Writtick Chatterjee; Ashok Dinda; Abhimanyu Easwaran; Aamir Gani; Shreevats Goswami (wk); Mohammed Shami; Pragyan Ojha; Writam Porel; Veer Pratap Singh; Wriddhiman Saha (wk); Sourav Sarkar; Pankaj Shaw; Manoj Tiwary	Gautam Gambhir (c); Unmukt Chand (vc); Vaibhav Rawal; Milind Kumar; Kshitij Rana; Yogesh Nagar; Dhruv Shaurya; Manan Sharma; Pulkit Narang; Mohit Ahlawat (wk); Parvinder Awana; Sumit Narwal; Pradeep Sangwan; Pawan Suyal; Sarang Rawat	Virender Sehwag (c); Chaitanya Bishnoi; Sanjay Budhwar; Yuzvendra Chahal; Rahul Dagar; Rahul Dalal; Rahul Dewan; Ashish Hooda; Sanjay Pahal; Harshal Patel; Himanshu Rana; Sachin Rana; Nitin Saini (wk); Guntashveer Singh; Priyank Tehlan; Jayant Yadav	Vinay Kumar (c); Chidhambaram Gautam; Mayank Agarwal; Shishir Bhavane; Shreyas Gopal; Abhimanyu Mithun; Karun Nair; Manish Pandey; Udit Patel; Prasidh Krishna; Abhishek Reddy; Ravikumar Samarth; HS Sharath; Jagadeesha Suchith; Robin Uthappa

Maharashtra	Odisha	Rajasthan	Vidarbha
Rohit Motwani (c); Ankit Bawne; Chirag Khurana; Sangram Atitkar; Akshay Darekar; Nikit Dhumal; Samad Fallah; Swapnil Gugale; Kedar Jadhav; Harshad Khadiwale; Shrikant Mundhe; Domnic Muthuswami; Anupam Sanklecha; Naushad Shaikh; Rahul Tripathi; Vijay Zol	Biplab Samantray (c); Govinda Podder (vc); Basant Mohanty; Deepak Behera; Jayanta Behera; Amit Das; Pratik Das; Rajesh Dhuper (wk); Abhilash Mallick; Natraj Behera; Suryakant Pradhan; Roshan Kumar Rao (wk); Girjia Rout; Anurag Sarangi; Alok Chandra Sahoo	Ashok Menaria (c); Vineet Saxena (vc); Pranay Sharma; Kukna Ajay Singh; Rajesh Bishnoi; Deepak Chahar; Aniket Choudhary; Arjit Gupta; Madhur Khatri; Ankit Lamba; Manjeet Singh; Puneet Yadav; Nathu Singh; Suryaprakash Suwalka; Dishant Yagnik (wk)	S Badrinath (c); Faiz Fazal (vc); Ravi Jangid; Aditya Shanware; Amol Ubarhande (wk); Swapnil Bandiwar; Ganesh Satish; Wasim Jaffer; Aditya Sarwate; Jitesh Sharma; Shalabh Shrivastava; Yadvendra Tembhare; Ravikumar Thakur; Shrikant Wagh; Akshay Wakhare

== Points table ==
Team	Pld	W	L	D	A	WI	FI	Pts	NRR
Vidarbha	8	4	2	2	0	1	1	29	+0.047
Bengal	8	2	0	6	0	0	5	28	+0.110
Assam	8	3	2	3	0	1	2	26	-0.304
Delhi	8	3	1	4	0	1	1	25	+0.215
Karnataka	8	2	1	5	0	1	3	24	+0.336
Rajasthan	8	2	3	3	0	0	1	17	-0.313
Maharashtra	8	1	2	5	0	0	3	17	+0.301
Odisha	8	1	3	4	0	0	1	12	+0.016
Haryana	8	0	4	4	0	0	1	6	-0.406

- Top three teams advance to knockout stage.
- Bottom place team will be relegated to Group C for 2016–17 Ranji Trophy.

== Fixtures ==
=== Round 1 ===
1–4 October
Scorecard

Vidarbha (H)	v	Odisha
467 (143.4 overs); Umesh Yadav 128* (119); Basant Mohanty 3/65 (28 overs)		274 (94.3 overs); Govinda Podder 148* (254); Akshay Wakhare 4/84 (30 overs)
		230/6 (f/o) (105 overs); Anurag Sarangi 92 (178); Akshay Wakhare 5/77 (37 overs)

Match drawn
VCA Stadium, Nagpur
Umpires: Saiyed Khalid (Ind) and Krishnamachari Srinivasan (Ind)
Player of the match: Akshay Wakhare (Vidarbha)

- Vidarbha won the toss and elected to bat
- Rajesh Dhuper (Odisha), Aditya Shanware and Jitesh Sharma (Vidarbha) made their first-class debuts.
- Points: Vidarbha 3, Odisha 1

1–4 October
Scorecard

Haryana	v	(H) Maharashtra
335 (106.1 overs); Himanshu Rana 157 (271); Nikit Dhumal 3/55 (18.1 overs)		570/6 (150 overs); Ankit Bawne 172 (291); Ashish Hooda 2/75 (25 overs)

Match drawn
MCA Cricket Stadium, Pune
Umpires: Sudhir Asnani (Ind) and Puttarangaiah Jayapal (Ind)
Player of the match: Ankit Bawne (Maharashtra)

- Haryana won the toss and elected to bat
- Chaitanya Bishnoi, Rahul Dagar and Sanjay Pahal (Haryana) made their first-class debuts.
- Points: Maharashtra 3, Haryana 1

1–4 October
Scorecard

Delhi	v	(H) Rajasthan
138 (47 overs); Sumit Narwal 25 (36); Deepak Chahar 5/60 (15 overs)		240 (75.4 overs); Deepak Chahar 50 (48); Sumit Narwal 3/47 (19 overs)
437/9d (124.5 overs); Sumit Narwal 106* (94); Nathu Singh 7/87 (31.5 overs)		186/3 (91 overs); Vineet Saxena 80* (274); Pawan Suyal 2/23 (18 overs)

Match drawn
Sawai Mansingh Stadium, Jaipur
Umpires: Nand Kishore (Ind) and Pashchim Pathak (Ind)
Player of the match: Deepak Chahar (Rajasthan)

- Rajasthan won the toss and elected to field
- Mohit Ahlawat (Delhi) and Nathu Singh (Rajasthan) made their first-class debuts.
- Points: Rajasthan 3, Delhi 1

1–4 October
Scorecard

Karnataka	v	(H) Assam
187 (75.2 overs); Shishir Bhavane 65 (143); Jamaluddin Syed Mohammad 7/44 (18.2 overs)		194 (78.5 overs); Amit Verma 57 (125); 2/20 (16.5 overs)
394/8d (94 overs); Ravikumar Samarth 131 (199); Swarupam Purkayastha 3/78 (17)		259/5 (102 overs); Arun Karthik 115 (258); Jagadeesha Suchith 2/60 (26 overs)

Match drawn
Barsapara Cricket Stadium, Guwahati
Umpires: Rajesh Deshpande (Ind) and Nitin Pandit (Ind)
Player of the match: Jagadeesha Suchith (Assam)

- Karnataka won the toss and elected to bat
- Points: Assam 3, Karnataka 1

=== Round 2 ===
8–11 October
Scorecard

Maharashtra	v	Odisha (H)
281 (101.2 overs); Harshad Khadiwale 74 (164); Suryakant Pradhan 4/90 (28 overs)		267 (103.5 overs); Govinda Podder 100 (205); Shrikant Mundhe 6/62 (31 overs)
289/4d (92.1 overs); Kedar Jadhav 100* (133); Basant Mohanty 2/58 (21 overs)		129/5 (55 overs); Girjia Rout 31 (111); Anupam Sanklecha 2/11 (7 overs)

Match drawn
Barabati Stadium, Cuttack
Umpires: Puttarangaiah Jayapal (Ind) and Sadashiv Iyer (Ind)
Player of the match: Shrikant Mundhe (Maharashtra)

- Odisha won the toss and elected to field.

8–11 October
Scorecard

Rajasthan	v	Assam (H)
186 (83.4 overs); Vineet Saxena 42 (143); Krishna Das 5/32 (17.4 overs)		422/9d (151 overs); Arun Karthik 151 (315); Kukna Ajay Singh 5/116 (39.5 overs)
84 (28.4 overs); Ashok Menaria 21 (27); Krishna Das 5/23 (12 overs)

Assam won by an innings and 152 runs
Barsapara Cricket Stadium, Guwahati
Umpires: Belur Ravi (Ind) and Ravi Subramanian (Ind)
Player of the match: Krishna Das (Assam)

- Assam won the toss and elected to field.
- Kukna Ajay Singh (Rajasthan) made his first-class debut.

8–11 October
Scorecard

Bengal	v	Karnataka (H)
312 (88.2 overs); Sudip Chatterjee 145 (247); Vinay Kumar 4/80 (22.2 overs)		537/9d (150.4 overs); Shreyas Gopal 139 (265); Veer Pratap Singh 4/86 (24 overs)
249/4 (86 overs); Manoj Tiwary 103* (197); Jagadeesha Suchith 1/27 (12 overs)

Match drawn
M Chinnaswamy Stadium, Bangalore
Umpires: Nitin Menon (Ind) and Pashchim Pathak (Ind)
Player of the match: Manoj Tiwary (Bengal)

- Karnataka won the toss and elected to field.
- Naved Ahmed (Bengal) made his first-class debut.

8–11 October
Scorecard

Vidarbha	v	Delhi (H)
298 (117 overs); Faiz Fazal 56 (148); Ishant Sharma 6/36 (23 overs)		302 (123.3 overs); Gautam Gambhir 96 (236); Akshay Wakhare 5/113 (44.3 overs)
98 (55.1 overs); Aditya Shanware 25 (87); Ishant Sharma 3/11 (11 overs)		96/0 (14.1 overs); Unmukt Chand 51* (41)

Delhi won by 10 wickets
Feroz Shah Kotla, Delhi
Umpires: KN Ananthapadmanabhan (Ind) and Nand Kishore (Ind)
Player of the match: Manan Sharma (Delhi)

- Delhi won the toss and elected to field.
- Nitish Rana and Sarang Rawat (both Delhi) made their first-class debuts.

=== Round 3 ===
15–18 October
Scorecard

Assam	v	Odisha (H)
92 (52.4 overs); Amit Verma 20 (66); Basant Mohanty 5/24 (14.4 overs)		88 (41 overs); Anurag Sarangi 27 (119); Krishna Das 7/21 (16 overs)
137 (75.3 overs); Jamaluddin Syed Mohammad 42* (164); Suryakant Pradhan 5/27 (15.3 overs)		142/2 (35 overs); Govinda Podder 77* (77); Pritam Das 1/42 (9 overs)

Odisha won by 8 wickets
Barabati Stadium, Cuttack
Umpires: Saiyed Khalid (Ind) and Rohan Pandit (Ind)
Player of the match: Basant Mohanty (Odisha)

- Odisha won the toss and elected to field.

15–18 October
Scorecard

Rajasthan	v	Bengal (H)
198 (95.5 overs); Vineet Saxena 66* (271); Pragyan Ojha 4/49 (37 overs)		282 (90.3 overs); Manoj Tiwary 83 (173); Kukna Ajay Singh 3/72 (25.3 overs)
146/5 (57 overs); Ashok Menaria 69* (174); Ashok Dinda 2/21 (9 overs)

Match drawn
Eden Gardens, Kolkata
Umpires: Rajesh Deshpande (Ind) and Navdeep Singh (Ind)
Player of the match: Manoj Tiwary (Bengal)

- Rajasthan won the toss and elected to bat.
- Aamir Gani and Pankaj Shaw (both Bengal) made their first-class debuts.

15–18 October
Scorecard

Haryana	v	Delhi (H)
195 (78.1 overs); Jayant Yadav 41 (98); Manan Sharma 5/57 (27.1 overs)		237 (73.4 overs); Unmukt Chand 68 (132); Jayant Yadav 4/78 (22.4 overs)
265 (93.4 overs); Virender Sehwag 51 (88); Manan Sharma 6/105 (40.4 overs)		225/6 (68. overs); Unmukt Chand 99 (143); Harshal Patel 4/76 (22 overs)

Delhi won by 4 wickets
Feroz Shah Kotla, Delhi
Umpires: Ravi Subramaniam Iyer (Ind) and Krishnamachari Srinivasan (Ind)
Player of the match: Unmukt Chand (Delhi)

- Delhi won the toss and elected to field.

15–18 October
Scorecard

Karnataka (H)	v	Vidarbha
350 (102.4 overs); Manish Pandey 104 (163); Ravikumar Thakur 4/50 (27.4 overs)		310 (118.4 overs); S Badrinath 92 (216); Sreenath Aravind 4/46 (23.4 overs)
331/3d (112 overs); Ravikumar Samarth 121* (151); Swapnil Bandiwar 2/50 (18 overs)		17/0 (11 overs); Aditya Shanware 7* (31)

Match drawn
M Chinnaswamy Stadium, Bangalore
Umpires: Pashchim Pathak (Ind) and Virender Sharma (Ind)
Player of the match: Manish Pandey (Karnataka)

- Vidarbha won the toss and elected to field.

=== Round 4 ===
22–25 October
Scorecard

Rajasthan (H)	v	Maharashtra
318 (102.1 overs); Ashok Menaria 84 (125); Samad Fallah 3/77 (26 overs)		409 (120.5 overs); Rahul Tripathi 119 (250); Kukna Ajay Singh 4/87 (21 overs)
334/5d (115.3 overs); Ashok Menaria 150* (304); Shrikant Mundhe 2/51 (18 overs)		17/0 (5.3 overs); Swapnil Gugale 14* (20)

Match drawn
Sawai Mansingh Stadium, Jaipur
Umpires: Jayaraman Madanagopal (Ind) and Sivasubramaniyan Shankar (Ind)
Player of the match: Rahul Tripathi (Maharashtra)

- Maharashtra won the toss and elected to field.

22–25 October
Scorecard

Assam	v	Vidarbha (H)
206 (87 overs); Jamaluddin Syed Mohammad 69 (139); Akshay Wakhare 4/47 (30 overs)		154 (74 overs); Ganesh Satish 67 (159); Swarupam Purkayastha 4/47 (21 overs)
160 (81.3 overs); Swarupam Purkayastha 35 (57); Aditya Sarwate 6/64 (33 overs)		215/7 (74 overs); Wasim Jaffer 71 (119); Amit Verma 3/55 (24 overs)

Vidarbha won by 3 wickets
Vidarbha Cricket Association Stadium, Nagpur
Umpires: Saiyed Khalid (Ind) and Ravi Subramanian (Ind)
Player of the match: Wasim Jaffer (Vidarbha)

- Assam won the toss and elected to bat.
- Aditya Sarwate (Vidarbha) made his first-class debut.

22–25 October
Scorecard

Bengal	v	Delhi (H)
357 (135.5 overs); Sudip Chatterjee 116 (243); Pradeep Sangwan 4/48 (25.5 overs)		249 (101.2 overs); Milind Kumar 77 (193); Pragyan Ojha 4/77 (27 overs)
217/5d (73.2 overs); Manoj Tiwary 97 (199); Sumit Narwal 2/37 (15.2 overs)		161/4 (37 overs); Rishabh Pant 57 (71); Aamir Gani 3/47 (9 overs)

Match drawn
Feroz Shah Kotla Ground, Delhi
Umpires: C. K. Nandan (Ind) and Krishnaraj Srinath (Ind)
Player of the match: Sudip Chatterjee (Bengal)

- Delhi won the toss and elected to field.
- Rishabh Pant (Delhi) made his first-class debut.

22–25 October
Scorecard

Haryana	v	Karnataka (H)
331 (90.1 overs); Virender Sehwag 136 (170); H. S. Sharath 5/48 (19.4 overs)		221 (75.4 overs); Lokesh Rahul 63 (103); Rahul Dagar 3/10 (5.4 overs)
262/9d (91 overs); Nitin Saini 52 (121); Shreyas Gopal 4/53 (18 overs)		202/8 (98 overs); Robin Uthappa 66 (194); Jayant Yadav 6/65 (39 overs)

Match drawn
Srikantadatta Narasimha Raja Wadeyar Stadium, Mysore
Umpires: Anil Dandekar (Ind) and Pashchim Pathak (Ind)
Player of the match: Jayant Yadav (Haryana)

- Haryana won the toss and elected to bat.
- David Mathias (Karnataka) made his first-class debut.

=== Round 5 ===
30 October–2 November
Scorecard

Delhi	v	Odisha (H)
311 (136.1 overs); Milind Kumar 59 (138); Suryakant Pradhan 4/119 (40.5 overs)		217 (75.5 overs); Anurag Sarangi 76 (186); Pradeep Sangwan 7/38 (18.5 overs)
193/9d (31.3 overs); Dhruv Shorey 62 (66); Basant Mohanty 6/39 (9.3 overs)		88/3 (38 overs); Natraj Behera 35 (61); Pulkit Narang 2/29 (13 overs)

Match drawn
KIIT Stadium, Bhubaneswar
Umpires: Abhijit Deshmukh (Ind) and C. K. Nandan (Ind)
Player of the match: Pradeep Sangwan (Delhi)

- Odisha won the toss and elected to field.
- Suboth Bhati, Pulkit Narang and Dhruv Shorey (Delhi) all made their first-class debuts.

30 October–2 November
Scorecard

Vidarbha (H)	v	Maharashtra
332 (125 overs); Faiz Fazal 120 (273); Shrikant Mundhe 3/60 (22 overs)		237 (90.1 overs); Chirag Khurana 74 (130); Aditya Sarwate 3/41 (21.1 overs)
149 (48 overs); Amol Ubarhande 47 (40); Akshay Darekar 5/78 (20 overs)		162 (46.3 overs); Harshad Khadiwale 55 (61); Akshay Wakhare 6/58 (22 overs)

Vidarbha won by 82 runs
Vidarbha Cricket Association Ground, Nagpur
Umpires: Yeshwant Barde (Ind) and R. Sundar (Ind)
Player of the match: Faiz Fazal (Vidarbha)

- Vidarbha won the toss and elected to bat.

30 October–2 November
Scorecard

Karnataka	v	Rajasthan (H)
281 (94 overs); Mayank Agarwal 66 (133); Aniket Choudhary 5/77 (24 overs)		242 (91.4 overs); Rajat Bhatia 99 (171); Vinay Kumar 3/42 (22 overs)
318/5d (63 overs); Robin Uthappa 160 (128); Rajat Bhatia 2/44 (17 overs)		265 (82.2 overs); Pranay Sharma 114 (190); David Mathias 3/53 (13 overs)

Karnataka won by 92 runs
Sawai Mansingh Stadium, Jaipur
Umpires: Rohan Pandit (Ind) and Virender Sharma (Ind)
Player of the match: Robin Uthappa (Karnataka)

- Rajasthan won the toss and elected to field.

30 October–2 November
Scorecard

Bengal	v	Haryana (H)
329 (103.3 overs); Pramod Chandila 65 (79); Sachin Rana 5/46 (16.3 overs)		225 (83.4 overs); Rohit Sharma 78 (153); Mukesh Kumar 4/53 (19 overs)
211/8d (93.5 overs); Pankaj Shaw 61 (148); Ashish Hooda 4/65 (25 overs)		195/6 (62 overs); Rohit Sharma 50 (98); Ashok Dinda 3/52 (16 overs)

Match drawn
Chaudhary Bansi Lal Cricket Stadium, Rohtak
Umpires: K. N. Ananthapadmanabhan (Ind) and Jayaraman Madanagopal (Ind)
Player of the match: Pankaj Shaw (Bengal)

- Haryana won the toss and elected to field.
- Pramod Chandila, Mukesh Kumar (Bengal) and Rohit Sharma (Haryana) all made their first-class debuts.

=== Round 6 ===
7–10 November
Scorecard

Odisha	v	Karnataka (H)
232 (84.1 overs); Govinda Poddar 153 (230); Shreyas Gopal 4/75 (29.1 overs)		400/9d (128 overs); Robin Uthappa 148 (257); Suryakant Pradhan 3/94 (28 overs)
104 (36.1 overs); Anurag Sarangi 44 (75); Stuart Binny 4/34 (11 overs)

Karnataka won by an innings and 64 runs
Srikantadatta Narasimha Raja Wadeyar Stadium, Mysore
Umpires: Nitin Pandit (Ind) and Virender Sharma (Ind)
Player of the match: Robin Uthappa (Karnataka)

- Odisha won the toss and elected to bat.
- Amit Das and Ranjit Singh (both Odisha) made their first-class debuts.

7–10 November
Scorecard

Maharashtra	v	Delhi (H)
80 (25.4 overs); Harshad Khadiwale 21 (36); Navdeep Saini 6/32 (11 overs)		230 (68.1 overs); Dhruv Shorey 104* (176); Samad Fallah 5/45 (19.1 overs)
176 (56 overs); Sangram Atitkar 30 (103); Manan Sharma 4/47 (16 overs)		30/1 (14 overs); Unmukt Chand 12* (43); Akshay Darekar 1/9 (7 overs)

Delhi won by 9 wickets
Feroz Shah Kotla Ground, Delhi
Umpires: Abhijit Deshmukh (Ind) and Nitin Menon (Ind)
Player of the match: Dhruv Shorey (Delhi)

- Maharashtra won the toss and elected to bat.

7–10 November
Scorecard

Haryana (H)	v	Assam
168 (70.5 overs); Himanshu Rana 56 (119); Krishna Das 6/56 (26.5 overs)		120 (52.2 overs); Gokul Sharma 43 (91); Ashish Hooda 4/27 (13.2 overs)
111 (50.3 overs); Himanshu Rana 27 (68); Arup Das 6/39 (19.3 overs)		160/4 (54.1 overs); Amit Verma 51* (115); Ashish Hooda 2/62 (15 overs)

Assam won by 6 wickets
Chaudhary Bansi Lal Cricket Stadium, Rohtak
Umpires: Sadashiv Iyer (Ind) and Krishnamachari Srinivasan (Ind)
Player of the match: Krishna Das (Assam)

- Haryana won the toss and elected to bat.
- Rahul Hazarika (Assam) made his first-class debut.

7–10 November
Scorecard

Bengal (H)	v	Vidarbha
334 (115.4 overs); Sudip Chatterjee 116 (200); Akshay Wakhare 4/85 (31 overs)		202 (69.1 overs); Faiz Fazal 63 (120); Pragyan Ojha 7/58 (24.5 overs)
164 (62.5 overs); Manoj Tiwary 63 (127); Akshay Wakhare 5/61 (22 overs)		191 (91.1 overs); Ganesh Satish 96 (201); Pragyan Ojha 4/60 (34 overs)

Bengal won by 105 runs
Jadavpur University Campus 2nd Ground, Jadavpur
Umpires: Anil Dandekar (Ind) and Jayaraman Madanagopal (Ind)
Player of the match: Pragyan Ojha (Bengal)

- Vidarbha won the toss and elected to field.
- Sayan Ghosh (Bengal) made his first-class debut.

=== Round 7 ===
15–18 November
Scorecard

Odisha	v	Haryana (H)
529/6d (163 overs); Natraj Behera 255* (453); Harshal Patel 2/94 (28 overs)		216 (85.5 overs); Nitin Saini 51 (146); Basant Mohanty 3/51 (22 overs)
		250/4 (103 overs) f/o Chaitanya Bishnoi 86* (259); Suryakant Pradhan 2/56 (21 overs)

Match drawn
Chaudhary Bansi Lal Cricket Stadium, Rohtak
Umpires: Ulhas Gandhe (Ind) and Tapan Sharma (Ind)
Player of the match: Natraj Behera (Odisha)

- Odisha won the toss and elected to bat.

15–18 November
Scorecard

Bengal	v	Maharashtra (H)
528/8d (180 overs); Sudip Chatterjee 147 (311); Chirag Khurana 4/141 (41 overs)		406 (129.2 overs); Rahul Tripathi 132 (275); Pragyan Ojha 3/71 (22.2 overs)
100/1 (33 overs); Abhimanyu Easwaran 53* (103)

Match drawn
Maharashtra Cricket Association Stadium, Pune
Umpires: Sanjeev Dua (Ind) and Kamlesh Sharma (Ind)
Player of the match: Sudip Chatterjee (Bengal)

- Maharashtra won the toss and elected to field.

15–18 November
Scorecard

Rajasthan	v	Vidarbha (H)
216 (88.4 overs); Puneet Yadav 67 (114); Umesh Yadav 4/45 (17.4 overs)		247 (99.3 overs); Aditya Sarwate 50 (116); Tanveer Ul-Haq 4/60 (24 overs)
226 (78.1 overs); Ashok Menaria 76 (92); Aditya Sarwate 5/58 (18.1 overs)		199/2 (61.4 overs); Ganesh Satish 61* (119); Tanveer Ul-Haq 1/21 (9 overs)

Vidarbha won by 8 wickets
Vidarbha Cricket Association Ground, Nagpur
Umpires: Rajesh Deshpande (Ind) and Nand Kishore (Ind)

- Rajasthan won the toss and elected to bat.
- Sidhant Dobal (Rajasthan) made his first-class debut.
- Umesh Yadav (Vidarbha) took a hat-trick in the first innings.

15–18 November
Scorecard

Delhi	v	Assam (H)
149 (59.4 overs); Manan Sharma 46* (100); Krishna Das 4/38 (20 overs)		157 (54.1 overs); Arun Karthik 81 (169); Manan Sharma 4/41 (18 overs)
172 (83.2 overs); Unmukt Chand 44 (64); Amit Verma 3/42 (21 overs)		168/5 (56 overs); Rahul Hazarika 59 (132); Manan Sharma 2/51 (10 overs)

Assam won by 5 wickets
Dr. Bhupen Hazarika Cricket Stadium, Guwahati
Umpires: Saiyed Khalid (Ind) and Rohan Pandit (Ind)
Player of the match: Arun Karthik (Assam)

- Assam won the toss and elected to field.

=== Round 8 ===
23–26 November
Scorecard

Bengal (H)	v	Odisha
142 (47.3 overs); Abhimanyu Easwaran 88 (156); Dhiraj Singh 5/58 (20 overs)		107 (29 overs); Arabind Singh 21 (17); Aamir Gani 6/34 (12 overs)
135 (55.2 overs); Abhimanyu Easwaran 39 (85); Basant Mohanty 5/16 (17 overs)		37 (19.2 overs); Jayanta Behera 7* (22); Ashok Dinda 7/19 (10 overs)

Bengal won by 133 runs
Bengal Cricket Academy Ground, Kalyani
Umpires: Krishnamachari Bharatan (Ind) and R. Sundar (Ind)
Player of the match: Abhimanyu Easwaran (Bengal)

- Bengal won the toss and elected to bat.
- Anurag Tiwari (Bengal) made his first-class debut.
- Odisha's second innings score of 37 all out is their second lowest score in the Ranji Trophy. Following the match, the club lodged a complaint stating that the pitch was "underprepared".

23–26 November
Scorecard

Assam	v	Maharashtra (H)
298 (105 overs); Arun Karthik 130 (283); Shrikant Mundhe 4/67 (25 overs)		196 (69 overs); Rahul Tripathi 52 (111); Krishna Das 6/73 (30 overs)
135 (48.2 overs); Rahul Hazarika 31 (65); Domnic Muthuswami 4/21 (12.2 overs)		82/3 (15 overs); Sangram Atitkar 40* (44); Abu Nechim 1/1 (1 over)

Match drawn
Maharashtra Cricket Association Stadium, Pune
Umpires: Puttarangaiah Jayapal (Ind) and Rohan Pandit (Ind)
Player of the match: Arun Karthik (Assam)

- Maharashtra won the toss and elected to field.
- No play on day 1.

23–26 November
Scorecard

Haryana (H)	v	Rajasthan
112 (52.2 overs); Virender Sehwag 29 (32); Pankaj Singh 4/10 (14.2 overs)		279 (88.3 overs); Ashok Menaria 47 (79); Mohit Sharma 5/56 (26.3 overs)
324 (121.5 overs); Nitin Saini 146 (274); Pankaj Singh 5/85 (29.1 overs)		161/1 (38.5 overs); Puneet Yadav 107* (115); Harshal Patel 1/27 (8 overs)

Rajasthan won by 9 wickets
Chaudhary Bansi Lal Cricket Stadium, Rohtak
Umpires: C. K. Nandan (Ind) and Alex Wharf (Eng)
Player of the match: Pankaj Singh and Puneet Yadav (both Rajasthan)

- Rajasthan won the toss and elected to field.
- Mohit Hooda, Shamsher Yadav (Haryana) and Manender Singh (Rajasthan) all made their first-class debuts.

23–26 November
Scorecard

Karnataka (H)	v	Delhi
542 (149 overs); Robin Uthappa 148 (141); Navdeep Saini 3/85 (32 overs)		301 (104.1 overs); Gautam Gambhir 75 (151); Sreenath Aravind 2/41 (17 overs)
290/2 (92 overs); Nitish Rana 132* (175); Sreenath Aravind 2/39 (19 overs)

Match drawn
KSCA Rajnagar Stadium, Hubli
Umpires: Nitin Menon (Ind) and John Ward (Aus)
Player of the match: Mayank Agarwal (Karnataka)

- Delhi won the toss and elected to field.

=== Round 9 ===
1–4 December
Scorecard

Odisha	v	Rajasthan (H)
151 (52.2 overs); Anurag Sarangi 43 (99); Aniket Choudhary 6/27 (14.2 overs)		51 (27.2 overs); Vineet Saxena 12 (57); Alok Chandra Sahoo 6/33 (13.2 overs)
129 (39.2 overs); Alok Chandra Sahoo 31 (39); Aniket Choudhary 4/31 (10 overs)		231/8 (65.5 overs); Puneet Yadav 59 (75); Basant Mohanty 3/65 (26 overs)

Rajasthan won by 2 wickets
Sawai Mansingh Stadium, Jaipur
Umpires: Jayaraman Madanagopal (Ind) and Nand Kishore (Ind)
Player of the match: Aniket Choudhary (Rajasthan)

- Rajasthan won the toss and elected to field.

1–4 December
Scorecard

Maharashtra (H)	v	Karnataka
212 (62.4 overs); Ankit Bawne 87* (158); Sreenath Aravind 3/35 (16 overs)		180 (67.4 overs); Mayank Agarwal 33 (74); Anupam Sanklecha 4/58 (25.4 overs)
260 (93 overs); Shrikant Mundhe 81 (150); Vinay Kumar 4/71 (27 overs)		239 (72 overs); Chidhambaram Gautam 65* (104); Nikit Dhumal 5/78 (25 overs)

Maharashtra won by 53 runs
Maharashtra Cricket Association Stadium, Pune
Umpires: Subrat Das (Ind) and Tapan Sharma (Ind)
Player of the match: Nikit Dhumal (Maharashtra)

- Karnataka won the toss and elected to field.

1–4 December
Scorecard

Bengal	v	Assam (H)
444/6d (158); Shreevats Goswami 112* (253); Gokul Sharma 2/39 (24 overs)		143 (54.4 overs); Tarjinder Singh 50 (128); Ashok Dinda 4/39 (14 overs)
		143/8 (84 overs); Pallavkumar Das 55 (182); Aamir Gani 5/62 (32 overs)

Match drawn
Dr. Bhupen Hazarika Cricket Stadium, Guwahati
Umpires: Yeshwant Barde (Ind) and Anil Dandekar (Ind)
Player of the match: Shreevats Goswami (Bengal)

- Assam won the toss and elected to field.
- Wasiqur Rahman (Assam) made his first-class debut.

1–4 December
Scorecard

Vidarbha (H)	v	Haryana
504/7d (155 overs); Faiz Fazal 126 (266); Harshal Patel 2/70 (22 overs)		241 (99.3 overs); Nitin Saini 67 (157); Ravi Jangid 4/44 (28 overs)
		232 (103.1 overs) f/o Rohit Sharma 107 (241); Ravi Jangid 7/59 (41 overs)

Vidarbha won by an innings and 31 runs
Vidarbha Cricket Association Ground, Nagpur
Umpires: Belur Ravi (Ind) and R. Sundar (Ind)
Player of the match: Ravi Jangid (Vidarbha)

- Vidarbha won the toss and elected to bat.

== See also ==
- 2015–16 Ranji Trophy
- 2015–16 Ranji Trophy Group B
- 2015–16 Ranji Trophy Group C
