= 2014–15 Ranji Trophy =

Indian cricket tournament

- The Ranji Trophy, awarded to the winners
- Dates: 7 December 2014 – 12 March 2015
- Administrator: BCCI
- Cricket format: First-class cricket
- Tournament format: Round-robin then knockout
- Champions: Karnataka (8th title)
- Participants: 27
- Matches: 115
- Most runs: Robin Uthappa (912) (Karnataka)
- Most wickets: Vinay Kumar (48) (Karnataka)

The 2014–15 Ranji Trophy was the 81st edition of the Ranji Trophy, the premier first-class cricket tournament in India. It was contested by 27 teams divided into three groups of nine teams each. The top three teams from Groups A and B advanced to the quarter-finals with the top two teams from Group C. Karnataka retained the title won during the 2013–14 season. In the final, Karun Nair scored 328 runs, the highest total in the final of the Ranji Trophy.

== Points system ==
The 27 teams are divided into three groups of nine teams each. The top three teams from Groups A and B advance to the quarterfinals along with the top two teams from Group C. The winner of this knock-out tournament wins the Ranji Trophy. These knock-out matches are decided on the first innings result if the final result is a draw.

Points in the group stage of the tournament are awarded as follows:

Scenario	Points
Outright win	6
Bonus point (for innings and 10 wicket wins)	1
1st innings lead (in case of draw)	3
1st innings deficit (in case of draw)	1
No result	1
Outright defeat	none

== Groups ==
The groups drawn are as follows:

Group A

- Karnataka
- Bengal
- Mumbai
- Railways
- Uttar Pradesh
- Baroda
- Tamil Nadu
- Jammu and Kashmir
- Madhya Pradesh

Group B

- Maharashtra
- Punjab
- Gujarat
- Saurashtra
- Rajasthan
- Delhi
- Vidarbha
- Haryana
- Odisha

Group C

- Goa
- Himachal Pradesh
- Kerala
- Hyderabad
- Andhra Pradesh
- Assam
- Tripura
- Jharkhand
- Services

== Points table ==
Group A

Team	Pld	W	L	T	D	NR	Pts	Q
Karnataka	8	4	0	0	4	0	33	1.633
Tamil Nadu	8	4	1	0	3	0	29	1.244
Mumbai	8	2	2	0	4	0	20	0.937
Madhya Pradesh	8	1	1	0	6	0	19	1.143
Baroda	8	1	2	0	5	0	18	1.078
Railways	8	0	2	0	6	0	16	0.922
Uttar Pradesh	8	2	3	0	3	0	15	0.760
Bengal	8	0	1	0	7	0	13	0.921
Jammu and Kashmir	8	1	0	3	4	0	12	0.601

- Advanced to knockout stage.
- Relegated to Group C for 2015–16 Ranji Trophy.

Group B

Team	Pld	W	L	T	D	NR	Pts	Q
Delhi	8	5	1	0	2	0	37	1.471
Maharashtra	8	3	2	0	3	0	26	1.269
Vidarbha	8	2	1	0	5	0	24	1.675
Gujarat	8	2	2	0	4	0	24	0.965
Odisha	8	3	3	0	2	0	20	0.965
Punjab	8	2	3	0	3	0	19	0.947
Rajasthan	8	2	3	0	3	0	18	0.821
Haryana	8	2	4	0	2	0	17	0.875
Saurashtra	8	1	3	0	4	0	10	0.688

- Advanced to knockout stage.
- Relegated to Group C for 2015–16 Ranji Trophy.

Group C

Team	Pld	W	L	T	D	NR	Pts	Q
Assam	8	5	1	0	2	0	38	1.325
Andhra	8	4	1	0	3	0	29	1.454
Himachal Pradesh	8	2	0	0	6	0	28	1.677
Jharkhand	8	2	1	0	5	0	21	1.171
Hyderabad	8	1	1	0	6	0	20	1.123
Kerala	8	1	1	0	6	0	20	0.908
Tripura	8	0	3	0	5	0	9	0.635
Services	8	0	4	0	4	0	8	0.779
Goa	8	0	3	0	5	0	5	0.664

- Advanced to knockout stage and promoted to Group A and B respectively for 2015–16 Ranji Trophy.

== Knockout stage ==
Quarterfinals
C1	Assam	185 & 338/4
A1	Karnataka (F)	452 & 415/5d
B1	Delhi	166 & 236
A3	Mumbai	156 & 450
A2	Tamil Nadu (F)	403 & 266
B3	Vidarbha	259 & 142/8
C2	Andhra	138 & 101
B2	Maharashtra	91 & 223

Semifinals
A1	Karnataka	202 & 286
A3	Mumbai	44 & 332
A2	Tamil Nadu (F)	549 & 119/0d
B2	Maharashtra	454

Final
A1	Karnataka	762
A2	Tamil Nadu	134 & 411

(F) - Advanced to next round on First Innings Lead

=== Quarter-finals ===
16–20 February
Scorecard

Karnataka	v	Assam
452 (144.2 overs); Robin Uthappa 153 (227); Krishna Das 4/101 (37.2 overs)		185 (75 overs); Gokul Sharma 58 (168); Sreenath Aravind 3/36 (17 overs)
415/5d (115 overs); Ravikumar Samarth 178 (298); Arup Das 2/63 (19 overs)		338/4 (88 overs); Gokul Sharma 127* (191); Ravikumar Samarth 2/67 (15 overs)

Match drawn
Holkar Cricket Stadium, Indore
Umpires: Nitin Menon and Pashchim Pathak
Player of the match: Robin Uthappa (Karnataka)

- Assam won the toss and elected to field
- Karnataka won on 1st innings

16–20 February
Scorecard

Mumbai	v	Delhi
156 (81 overs); Nikhil Patil 54* (116); Sumit Narwal 3/37 (19 overs)		166 (54 overs); Virender Sehwag 49 (58); Shardul Thakur 5/54 (16 overs)
450 (143.1 overs); Akhil Herwadkar 161 (272); Manan Sharma 4/92 (30 overs)		236 (87 overs); Rajat Bhatia 49 (122); Balwinder Sandhu 3/35 (17 overs)

Mumbai won by 204 runs
DRIEMS Ground, Cuttack
Umpires: Nand Kishore and Krishnaraj Srinath
Player of the match: Shardul Thakur (Mumbai)

- Delhi won the toss and elected to field

16–20 February
Scorecard

Tamil Nadu	v	Vidarbha
403 (169.5 overs); Vijay Shankar 111 (305); Rakesh Dhurv 3/106 (35.4 overs)		259 (105.2 overs); Sachin Katariya 42 (152); Malolan Rangarajan 3/42 (24.2 overs)
266 (98.2 overs); Vijay Shankar 82 (146); Swapnil Bandiwar 3/42 (14 overs)		142/8 (49 overs); Ganesh Satish 59* (131); Baba Aparajith 3/41 (19 overs)

Match drawn
Sawai Mansingh Stadium, Jaipur
Umpires: Anil Dandekar and Rajesh Deshpande
Player of the match: Vijay Shankar (Tamil Nadu)

- Vidarbha won the toss and elected to field
- Tamil Nadu won on 1st innings

16–20 February
Scorecard

Maharashtra	v	Andhra
91 (41.5 overs); Rohit Motwani 23 (66); Siva Kumar 6/41 (16.5 overs)		138 (63.3 overs); Murumulla Sriram 31 (83); Anupam Sanklecha 4/45 (18 overs)
223 (68.3 overs); Kedar Jadhav 81 (86); Siva Kumar 6/79 (21.3 overs)		101 (46.3 overs); AG Pradeep 25 (80); Anupam Sanklecha 4/19 (11 overs)

Maharashtra won by 75 runs
Chaudhary Bansi Lal Cricket Stadium, Rohtak
Umpires: Krishnamachari Bharatan and Virender Sharma
Player of the match: Kedar Jadhav (Maharashtra)

- Maharashtra won the toss and elected to bat

=== Semi-finals ===
25 February-1 March
Scorecard

Karnataka	v	Mumbai
202 (60.2 overs); Robin Uthappa 68 (100); Shardul Thakur 4/61 (18 overs)		44 (15.3 overs); Shreyas Iyer 15 (15); Vinay Kumar 6/20 (8 overs)
286 (77.5 overs); Abhimanyu Mithun 89 (113); Shardul Thakur 4/69 (17.5 overs)		332 (121.1 overs); Aditya Tare 98 (207); Abhimanyu Mithun 4/69 (34 overs)

Karnataka won by 112 runs
M Chinnaswamy Stadium, Bangalore
Umpires: Vineet Kulkarni and Krishnamachari Srinivasan
Player of the match: Vinay Kumar (Karnataka)

- Karnataka won the toss and elected to bat
- This is 2nd Lowest total(44) for Mumbai

25 February-1 March
Scorecard

Tamil Nadu	v	Maharashtra
549 (226.4 overs); Dinesh Karthik 113 (304); Anupam Sanklecha 3/115 (45 overs)		454 (142 overs); Swapnil Gugale 154 (282); Aswin Crist 4/89 (34 overs)
119/0 d (46.2 overs); Abhinav Mukund 66* (144); Shrikant Mundhe 0/7 (6 overs)

Match drawn
Eden Gardens, Kolkata
Umpires: Anil Chaudhary and Pashchim Pathak
Player of the match: Vijay Shankar (Tamil Nadu)

- Tamil Nadu won the toss and elected to bat
- Tamil Nadu won on 1st innings

=== Final ===
8–12 March
Scorecard

Tamil Nadu	v	Karnataka
134 (62.4 overs); Abhinav Mukund 35 (137); Vinay Kumar 5/34 (15.4 overs)		762 (231.2 overs); Karun Nair 328 (560); Lakshmipathy Balaji 3/95 (34 overs)
411 (107.5 ov); Dinesh Karthik 120 (112); Shreyas Gopal 4/126 (25 overs)

Karnataka won by an innings and 217 runs
Wankhede Stadium, Mumbai
Umpires: Anil Chaudhary (Ind) and Chettithody Shamshuddin (Ind)
Player of the match: Karun Nair (Karnataka)

- Karnataka won the toss and elected to field

== Statistics ==
=== Most runs ===
Player	Team	Inns	Runs	Ave	HS	100s	50s
Robin Uthappa	Karnataka	19	912	50.66	156	2	5
Dinesh Karthik	Tamil Nadu	19	884	55.25	129	4	2
Abhinav Mukund	Tamil Nadu	20	858	45.15	140	2	4
KL Rahul	Karnataka	9	838	93.11	337	2	3
Sheldon Jackson	Saurashtra	14	819	68.25	181*	3	3

=== Most wickets ===
Player	Team	Inns	Wickets	Ave.	BBI	BBM	5/i	10/m
Shardul Thakur	Mumbai	18	48	20.81	6/20	9/90	3	0
Vinay Kumar	Karnataka	19	48	18.72	6/53	9/123	5	0
Siva Kumar	Andhra	15	44	14.25	7/30	12/120	4	2
Sreenath Aravind	Karnataka	19	42	17.42	4/9	8/61	0	0
Rishi Dhawan	Himachal Pradesh	13	40	24.75	7/93	11/185	4	1
