= List of 2015 Indian Premier League personnel changes =

This is a list of all the personnel changes for the 2015 Indian Premier League (IPL). Apart from the players retained by their franchises, the rest entered the pool of players put up for auction. Notable names among these were Yuvraj Singh (released by Royal Challengers Bangalore), Pragyan Ojha and Zaheer Khan (released by Mumbai Indians), Kevin Pietersen (released by Delhi Daredevils) among others.

== Trading window ==
There were 2 trading windows prior to the auction which was held on 16 February 2015. A third trading window opened after the auction. During these trading windows, franchises could trade players with other franchises.

S.No	Nat	Name	Moving from	Moving to	Ref
1	India	Iqbal Abdullah	Rajasthan Royals	Royal Challengers Bangalore	
2	India	Manvinder Bisla	Kolkata Knight Riders	Royal Challengers Bangalore	
3	India	Parthiv Patel	Royal Challengers Bangalore	Mumbai Indians	
4	India	Unmukt Chand	Rajasthan Royals	Mumbai Indians	
5	India	Vinay Kumar	Kolkata Knight Riders	Mumbai Indians	
6	India	Mandeep Singh	Kings XI Punjab	Royal Challengers Bangalore	

== Retained players ==
Prior to the auction, teams could release players and retain those that they wanted for the next season. The salaries of the released players would be added to the salary purse of the teams which was increased to Rs. 63 crores for the 2015 edition. The salaries of the retained players was deducted from this purse.

== Auction ==
66 players (43 Indians and 23 Overseas) were sold at the auction. Yuvraj Singh and Dinesh Karthik fetched the highest bids of ₹ 16 crore and ₹ 10.5 crore respectively. Angelo Mathews was the most costly foreign player at ₹ 7.5 crore. Many prominent players such as Kumar Sangakkara, Ross Taylor, Alex Hales, Cameron White and Tillakaratne Dilshan remained unsold at the auction.

=== Sold players ===
Name	Nat	IPL Matches	IPL team(s)	IPL 2014 team	Capped / uncapped	Base Price in ₹ (in lakhs)	IPL 2015 team	Auctioned price in ₹ (in lakhs)
Michael Hussey	Australia	55	Chennai Super Kings / Mumbai Indians	Mumbai Indians	Capped	150	Chennai Super Kings	150
Irfan Pathan	India	98	Delhi Daredevils / Kings XI Punjab / Sunrisers Hyderabad	Sunrisers Hyderabad	Capped	150	Chennai Super Kings	150
Rahul Sharma	India	44	Deccan Chargers / Pune Warriors India / Delhi Daredevils	Delhi Daredevils	Capped	30	Chennai Super Kings	30
Kyle Abbott	South Africa	0	Kings XI Punjab		Capped	30	Chennai Super Kings	30
Andrew Tye	Australia	0			Uncapped	20	Chennai Super Kings	20
Pratyush Singh	India	0			Uncapped	10	Chennai Super Kings	10
Ankush Bains	India	0	Rajasthan Royals	Rajasthan Royals	Uncapped	10	Chennai Super Kings	10
Eklavya Dwivedi	India	0	Pune Warriors India		Uncapped	10	Chennai Super Kings	10
Yuvraj Singh	India	84	Kings XI Punjab / Pune Warriors India / Royal Challengers Bangalore	Royal Challengers Bangalore	Capped	200	Delhi Daredevils	1600
Angelo Mathews	Sri Lanka	35	Pune Warriors India / Kolkata Knight Riders		Capped	150	Delhi Daredevils	750
Zaheer Khan	India	70	Mumbai Indians / Royal Challengers Bangalore	Mumbai Indians	Capped	100	Delhi Daredevils	400
Amit Mishra	India	86	Deccan Chargers / Delhi Daredevils / Sunrisers Hyderabad	Sunrisers Hyderabad	Capped	10	Delhi Daredevils	350
Shreyas Iyer	India	0			Uncapped	10	Delhi Daredevils	260
Gurinder Sandhu	Australia	0			Capped	30	Delhi Daredevils	170
Jaydev Unadkat	India	33	Kolkata Knight Riders / Royal Challengers Bangalore / Delhi Daredevils	Delhi Daredevils	Capped	50	Delhi Daredevils	110
Domnic Joseph	India	0			Uncapped	10	Delhi Daredevils	75
Albie Morkel	South Africa	85	Chennai Super Kings / Royal Challengers Bangalore	Royal Challengers Bangalore	Capped	30	Delhi Daredevils	30
Marcus Stoinis	Australia	0			Uncapped	20	Delhi Daredevils	25
CM Gautam	India	12	Delhi Daredevils / Royal Challengers Bangalore / Mumbai Indians	Mumbai Indians	Uncapped	20	Delhi Daredevils	20
Srikar Bharat	India	0			Uncapped	10	Delhi Daredevils	10
KK Jiyas	India	0			Uncapped	10	Delhi Daredevils	10
Murali Vijay	India	75	Chennai Super Kings / Delhi Daredevils	Delhi Daredevils	Capped	50	Kings XI Punjab	300
Nikhil Naik	India	0			Uncapped	10	Kings XI Punjab	30
Yogesh Golwalkar	India	0			Uncapped	10	Kings XI Punjab	10
KC Cariappa	India	0			Uncapped	10	Kolkata Knight Riders	240
James Neesham	New Zealand	4	Delhi Daredevils	Delhi Daredevils	Capped	30	Kolkata Knight Riders	50
Brad Hogg	Australia	10	Rajasthan Royals		Capped	50	Kolkata Knight Riders	50
Aditya Garhwal	India	0			Uncapped	10	Kolkata Knight Riders	25
Sheldon Jackson	India	0	Royal Challengers Bangalore		Uncapped	10	Kolkata Knight Riders	15
Sumit Narwal	India	7	Rajasthan Royals		Uncapped	10	Kolkata Knight Riders	10
Vaibhav Rawal	India	0			Uncapped	10	Kolkata Knight Riders	10
Aaron Finch	Australia	36	Rajasthan Royals / Delhi Daredevils / Pune Warriors India / Sunrisers Hyderabad	Sunrisers Hyderabad	Capped	100	Mumbai Indians	320
Pragyan Ojha	India	91	Deccan Chargers / Mumbai Indians	Mumbai Indians	Capped	50	Mumbai Indians	50
Abhimanyu Mithun	India	16	Royal Challengers Bangalore		Capped	30	Mumbai Indians	30
Mitchell McClenaghan	New Zealand	0			Capped	30	Mumbai Indians	30
Aiden Blizzard	Australia	7	Mumbai Indians		Uncapped	30	Mumbai Indians	30
Hardik Pandya	India	0			Uncapped	10	Mumbai Indians	10
Akshay Wakhare	India	0			Uncapped	10	Mumbai Indians	10
Nitish Rana	India	0			Uncapped	10	Mumbai Indians	10
Siddhesh Lad	India	0			Uncapped	10	Mumbai Indians	10
Jagadeesha Suchith	India	0			Uncapped	10	Mumbai Indians	10
Chris Morris	South Africa	16	Chennai Super Kings		Capped	50	Rajasthan Royals	140
Rusty Theron	South Africa	9	Deccan Chargers / Kings XI Punjab		Capped	30	Rajasthan Royals	30
Barinder Sran	India	0			Uncapped	10	Rajasthan Royals	10
Dinesh Salunkhe	India	6	Rajasthan Royals		Uncapped	10	Rajasthan Royals	10
Sagar Trivedi	India	0			Uncapped	10	Rajasthan Royals	10
Pardeep Sahu	India	0			Uncapped	10	Rajasthan Royals	10
Dinesh Karthik	India	106	Delhi Daredevils / Kings XI Punjab / Mumbai Indians	Delhi Daredevils	Capped	200	Royal Challengers Bangalore	1050
Darren Sammy	Saint Lucia	20	Sunrisers Hyderabad	Sunrisers Hyderabad	Capped	100	Royal Challengers Bangalore	280
David Wiese	South Africa	0			Capped	30	Royal Challengers Bangalore	280
Sean Abbott	Australia	0			Capped	50	Royal Challengers Bangalore	100
Adam Milne	New Zealand	0			Capped	30	Royal Challengers Bangalore	70
Sarfaraz Khan	India	0			Uncapped	10	Royal Challengers Bangalore	50
Subramaniam Badrinath	India	95	Chennai Super Kings		Capped	30	Royal Challengers Bangalore	30
Jalaj Saxena	India	0	Mumbai Indians	Mumbai Indians	Uncapped	10	Royal Challengers Bangalore	10
Shishir Bhavane	India	0			Uncapped	10	Royal Challengers Bangalore	10
Trent Boult	New Zealand	0			Capped	50	Sunrisers Hyderabad	380
Praveen Kumar	India	85	Kings XI Punjab / Royal Challengers Bangalore / Mumbai Indians	Mumbai Indians	Capped	50	Sunrisers Hyderabad	220
Kevin Pietersen	England	32	Deccan Chargers / Delhi Daredevils / Royal Challengers Bangalore	Delhi Daredevils	Capped	200	Sunrisers Hyderabad	200
Eoin Morgan	England	32	Royal Challengers Bangalore / Kolkata Knight Riders		Capped	150	Sunrisers Hyderabad	150
Ravi Bopara	England	15	Kings XI Punjab		Capped	100	Sunrisers Hyderabad	100
Kane Williamson	New Zealand	0			Capped	50	Sunrisers Hyderabad	60
Laxmi Ratan Shukla	India	46	Kolkata Knight Riders / Delhi Daredevils	Delhi Daredevils	Capped	30	Sunrisers Hyderabad	30
Padmanabhan Prasanth	India	0	Kochi Tuskers Kerala		Uncapped	10	Sunrisers Hyderabad	10
Hanuma Vihari	India	17	Sunrisers Hyderabad		Uncapped	10	Sunrisers Hyderabad	10
Siddarth Kaul	India	11	Delhi Daredevils / Kolkata Knight Riders	Delhi Daredevils	Uncapped	10	Sunrisers Hyderabad	10

Source:Pepsi IPL 2015 Player Auction

== Withdrawn players ==
The following players withdrew from the tournament either due to injuries or because of other reasons.

Player	Team	Reason
James Neesham	Kolkata Knight Riders	Injury
Chris Lynn	Kolkata Knight Riders	Hamstring Injury
Kevin Pietersen	Sunrisers Hyderabad	Other reasons
Kane Richardson	Rajasthan Royals	Personal reasons
Josh Hazlewood	Mumbai Indians	National team commitment
Aaron Finch	Mumbai Indians	Hamstring injury
Mohammed Shami	Delhi Daredevils	Knee injury
Laxmi Ratan Shukla	Sunrisers Hyderabad	Illness
Adam Milne	Royal Challengers Bangalore	Heel Injury
Corey Anderson	Mumbai Indians	Fractured Finger
Shaun Marsh	Kings XI Punjab	National team commitment
Mitchell Johnson	Kings XI Punjab	National team commitment

=== Replacement signings ===
Players were signed as replacement of contracted players who were not available to play due to injuries and national commitments. Under IPL rules, the replacements have to be chosen from the pool of players who went unsold in the auction, and cannot be paid more than the players they are replacing, though they can be paid less.

Player	Replaced	Team	Reason for replacement
Azhar Mahmood	James Neesham	Kolkata Knight Riders	Injury
Johan Botha	Chris Lynn	Kolkata Knight Riders	Injury
Bipul Sharma	Laxmi Ratan Shukla	Sunrisers Hyderabad	Illness
Sreenath Aravind	Adam Milne	Royal Challengers Bangalore	Heel Injury
Ben Hilfenhaus	Aaron Finch	Mumbai Indians	Hamstring injury
Colin Munro	Josh Hazlewood	Mumbai Indians	National team commitment
Alex Hales	Corey Anderson	Mumbai Indians	Fractured Finger
