= 2016–17 Duleep Trophy =

- Dates: 23 August – 1 September 2016
- Administrator: BCCI
- Cricket format: First-class cricket
- Champions: India Blue (1st title)
- Participants: 3
- Matches: 4
- Most runs: Cheteshwar Pujara (453)
- Most wickets: Kuldeep Yadav (17)

The 2016–17 Duleep Trophy was the 55th season of the Duleep Trophy, a first-class cricket tournament in India. In June 2016, the Board of Control for Cricket in India (BCCI) announced that the tournament will feature day/night matches and pink ball will be used. The tournament was contested by three teams.

In August 2016 the BCCI confirmed that three teams, India Red, India Blue and India Green would play in a round-robin league stage. Each of these matches will last for four days, with the final scheduled to last five days, starting on 10 September. India Blue won the trophy, beating India Red by 355 runs in the final.

== Squads ==
India Red	India Blue	India Green
Yuvraj Singh (c); Ankush Bains (wk); Abhinav Mukund; KS Bharat; Sudip Chatterjee; Gurkeerat Singh; Arun Karthik; Akshay Wakhare; Kuldeep Yadav; Nathu Singh; Anureet Singh; Ishwar Pandey; Nitish Rana; M Ashwin; Abhimanyu Mithun	Gautam Gambhir (c); Dinesh Karthik (wk); Mayank Agarwal; Sheldon Jackson; Baba Aparajith; Siddhesh Lad; Parvez Rasool; Karaparambil Monish; Krishna Das; Suryakumar Yadav; Mohit Sharma; Pankaj Singh; Shardul Thakur; Cheteshwar Pujara; Hanuma Vihari	Suresh Raina (c); Parthiv Patel (wk); Robin Uthappa; Jalaj Saxena; Ambati Rayudu; Ian Dev Singh; Rohan Prem; Harbhajan Singh; Shreyas Gopal; Ashok Dinda; Sandeep Sharma; Ankit Rajpoot; Rajat Paliwal; Jasprit Bumrah; M Vijay; Pragyan Ojha; Saurabh Tiwary

== Fixtures ==
=== Round-robin ===
23–26 August
Scorecard

India Red	v	India Green
161 (48.2 overs); Abhinav Mukund 77 (116); Sandeep Sharma 4/62 (15 overs)		151 (45.4 overs); Saurabh Tiwary 50 (80); Nathu Singh 6/53 (12.4 overs)
486 (116.5 overs); Abhinav Mukund 169 (221); Shreyas Gopal 5/123 (28.5 overs)		277 (56.2 overs); Suresh Raina 90 (101); Kuldeep Yadav 6/88 (18 overs)

India Red won by 219 runs
Greater Noida Sports Complex Ground, Greater Noida
Umpires: Abhijit Deshmukh and Nand Kishore
Player of the match: Abhinav Mukund (India Red)

- India Red won the toss and elected to bat.

29 August – 1 September
Scorecard

India Blue	v	India Red
285/5 (78.2 overs); Mayank Agarwal 92 (167); Kuldeep Yadav 4/78 (23 overs)

Match drawn
Greater Noida Sports Complex Ground, Greater Noida
Umpires: Nitin Pandit and Virender Sharma

- India Red won the toss and elected to field.
- Rain stopped play in the 35th over on Day 1, with no further play possible.
- Only 30 overs of play was possible on Day 2 and just 16.2 overs on Day 3.
- No play was possible on Day 4.

4–7 September
Scorecard

India Blue	v	India Green
707 (176.3 overs); Cheteshwar Pujara 166 (280); Shreyas Gopal 5/173 (37.3 overs)		237 (61 overs); Parthiv Patel 55 (80); Abhimanyu Mithun 3/16 (7 overs)
298 (66.2 overs); Sheldon Jackson 79* (77); Shreyas Gopal 4/53 (10.2 overs)		179/4 (34 overs); Murali Vijay 73 (96); Karn Sharma 2/68 (10 overs)

Match drawn
Greater Noida Sports Complex Ground, Greater Noida
Umpires: Anil Dandekar and Nitin Menon
Player of the match: Mayank Agarwal (India Blue)

- India Blue won the toss and elected to bat.

=== Final ===
10–14 September
Scorecard

India Blue	v	India Red
693/6d (168.2 overs); Cheteshwar Pujara 256* (363); Amit Mishra 2/171 (41 overs)		356 (98.1 ov); Stuart Binny 98 (159); Ravindra Jadeja 5/95 (34 overs)
179/5d (45 overs); Mayank Agarwal 52 (83); Kuldeep Yadav 3/62 (19 overs)		161 (44.1 overs); Gurkeerat Singh 39 (37); Ravindra Jadeja 5/76 (18.1 overs)

India Blue won by 355 runs
Greater Noida Sports Complex Ground, Greater Noida
Umpires: Anil Chaudhary and Chettithody Shamshuddin
Player of the match: Cheteshwar Pujara (India Blue)

- India Blue won the toss and elected to bat.
