= List of 2019 Indian Premier League personnel changes =

2019 Indian Premier League Auction

General information
- Sport: Cricket
- Date: 18 December 2018
- Location: Jaipur
- Network: Star Sports
- Sponsored by: Vivo

Overview
- 60 Players (106.8 Cr) total selections
- League: Indian Premier League
- Teams: 8

This is a list of all personnel changes for the 2019 Indian Premier League (IPL).

== Pre-auction ==
IPL set the deadline of 15 November for both the trading window and the list of each IPL franchise team's retained and released players.

=== Transfers ===
After being unhappy with his retention price by Sunrisers Hyderabad, Shikhar Dhawan was rumored to be transferred to Mumbai Indians, or Kings XI Punjab before eventually returning to his home team of Delhi Capitals.

| Player | Nationality | Salary | From | To | Date | Ref |
|---|---|---|---|---|---|---|
| Quinton de Kock | South Africa | ₹2.8 crore (US$331,187.40) | Royal Challengers Bangalore | Mumbai Indians | 19 October 2018 | |
| Mandeep Singh | India | ₹1.4 crore (US$165,593.70) | Royal Challengers Bangalore^{[↓]} | Kings XI Punjab | 28 October 2018 | |
| Marcus Stoinis | Australia | ₹6.2 crore (US$733,343.40) | Kings XI Punjab^{[↑]} | Royal Challengers Bangalore | 28 October 2018 | |
| Shikhar Dhawan | India | ₹5.2 crore (US$615,062.20) | Sunrisers Hyderabad^{[↓]} | Delhi Capitals | 5 November 2018 | |
| Vijay Shankar | India | ₹3.2 crore (US$378,499.80) | Delhi Capitals^{[↑]} | Sunrisers Hyderabad | 5 November 2018 | |
| Shahbaz Nadeem | India | ₹3.2 crore (US$378,499.80) | Delhi Capitals^{[↑]} | Sunrisers Hyderabad | 5 November 2018 | |
| Abhishek Sharma | India | ₹55 lakh (US$65,054.70) | Delhi Capitals^{[↑]} | Sunrisers Hyderabad | 5 November 2018 | |

^{↓} ↓: Player(s) was/were swapped with the player(s) mentioned in the next row(s).
^{↑} ↑: Player(s) was/were swapped with the player(s) mentioned in the previous row(s).

=== Released players ===
Gautam Gambhir, Yuvraj Singh and Glenn Maxwell were the prominent names among the released players. Jaydev Unadkat, the costliest Indian player in 2018 auction, was also released.

| Player | Nationality | Salary | Date | Ref |
Chennai Super Kings
| Mark Wood | England | ₹1.5 crore (US$177,421.80) | 14 November 2018 | |
| Kanishk Seth | India | ₹20 lakh (US$23,656.20) | 14 November 2018 | |
| Kshitiz Sharma | India | ₹20 lakh (US$23,656.20) | 14 November 2018 | |
Delhi Capitals
| Glenn Maxwell | Australia | ₹9 crore (US$1.1 million) | 15 November 2018 | |
| Mohammad Shami | India | ₹3 crore (US$354,843.60) | 15 November 2018 | |
| Gautam Gambhir | India | ₹2.8 crore (US$331,187.40) | 15 November 2018 | |
| Daniel Christian | Australia | ₹1.5 crore (US$177,421.80) | 15 November 2018 | |
| Jason Roy | England | ₹1.5 crore (US$177,421.80) | 15 November 2018 | |
| Naman Ojha | India | ₹1.4 crore (US$165,593.70) | 15 November 2018 | |
| Gurkeerat Singh | India | ₹75 lakh (US$88,710.90) | 15 November 2018 | |
| Sayan Ghosh | India | ₹20 lakh (US$23,656.20) | 15 November 2018 | |
| Liam Plunkett^{[REP]} | England | ₹2 crore (US$236,562.40) | 15 November 2018 | |
| Junior Dala^{[REP]} | South Africa | ₹20 lakh (US$23,656.20) | 15 November 2018 | |
Kings XI Punjab
| Axar Patel^{[RET]} | India | ₹6.75 crore (US$798,398.10) (Note: Axar was retained at a salary of ₹6.75 crore (US$798,398.10) but as per the IPL rules, the actual purse deduction for the Punjab team was ₹12.5 crore (US$1.5 million).) | 15 November 2018 | |
| Aaron Finch | Australia | ₹6.2 crore (US$733,343.40) | 15 November 2018 | |
| Mohit Sharma | India | ₹2.4 crore (US$283,874.90) | 15 November 2018 | |
| Barinder Sran | India | ₹2.2 crore (US$260,218.60) | 15 November 2018 | |
| Yuvraj Singh | India | ₹2 crore (US$236,562.40) | 15 November 2018 | |
| Ben Dwarshuis | Australia | ₹1.4 crore (US$165,593.70) | 15 November 2018 | |
| Akshdeep Nath | India | ₹1 crore (US$118,281.20) | 15 November 2018 | |
| Manoj Tiwary | India | ₹1 crore (US$118,281.20) | 15 November 2018 | |
| Manzoor Dar | India | ₹20 lakh (US$23,656.20) | 15 November 2018 | |
| Mayank Dagar | India | ₹20 lakh (US$23,656.20) | 15 November 2018 | |
| Pardeep Sahu | India | ₹20 lakh (US$23,656.20) | 15 November 2018 | |
Kolkata Knight Riders
| Mitchell Starc | Australia | ₹9.4 crore (US$1.1 million) | 14 November 2018 | |
| Cameron Delport | South Africa | ₹30 lakh (US$35,484.40) | 15 November 2018 | |
| Javon Searles | West Indies | ₹30 lakh (US$35,484.40) | 15 November 2018 | |
| Apoorv Wankhade | India | ₹20 lakh (US$23,656.20) | 15 November 2018 | |
| Ishank Jaggi | India | ₹20 lakh (US$23,656.20) | 15 November 2018 | |

| Player | Nationality | Salary | Date | Ref |
Mumbai Indians
| Mustafizur Rahman | Bangladesh | ₹2.2 crore (US$260,218.60) | 19 October 2018 | |
| Akila Dananjaya | Sri Lanka | ₹50 lakh (US$59,140.60) | 19 October 2018 | |
| Pat Cummins | Australia | ₹5.4 crore (US$638,718.50) | 15 November 2018 | |
| Pradeep Sangwan | India | ₹1.5 crore (US$177,421.80) | 15 November 2018 | |
| JP Duminy | South Africa | ₹1 crore (US$118,281.20) | 15 November 2018 | |
| Saurabh Tiwary | India | ₹80 lakh (US$94,625.00) | 15 November 2018 | |
| Tajinder Singh | India | ₹55 lakh (US$65,054.70) | 15 November 2018 | |
| MD Nidheesh | India | ₹20 lakh (US$23,656.20) | 15 November 2018 | |
| Mohsin Khan | India | ₹20 lakh (US$23,656.20) | 15 November 2018 | |
| Sharad Lumba | India | ₹20 lakh (US$23,656.20) | 15 November 2018 | |
Rajasthan Royals
| Jaydev Unadkat | India | ₹11.5 crore (US$1.4 million) | 15 November 2018 | |
| D'Arcy Short | Australia | ₹4 crore (US$473,124.80) | 15 November 2018 | |
| Zahir Khan Pakteen | Afghanistan | ₹60 lakh (US$70,968.70) | 15 November 2018 | |
| Ben Laughlin | Australia | ₹50 lakh (US$59,140.60) | 15 November 2018 | |
| Dushmantha Chameera | Sri Lanka | ₹50 lakh (US$59,140.60) | 15 November 2018 | |
| Anureet Singh | India | ₹30 lakh (US$35,484.40) | 15 November 2018 | |
| Ankit Sharma | India | ₹20 lakh (US$23,656.20) | 15 November 2018 | |
| Jatin Saxena | India | ₹20 lakh (US$23,656.20) | 15 November 2018 | |
| Heinrich Klaasen^{[REP]} | South Africa | ₹50 lakh (US$59,140.60) | 15 November 2018 | |
Royal Challengers Bangalore
| Chris Woakes | England | ₹7.4 crore (US$875,280.90) | 15 November 2018 | |
| Brendon McCullum | New Zealand | ₹3.6 crore (US$425,812.30) | 15 November 2018 | |
| Sarfaraz Khan^{[RET]} | India | ₹1.75 crore (US$206,992.10) (Note: Sarfaraz was retained at a salary of ₹1.75 crore (US$206,992.10) but as per the IPL rules, the actual purse deduction for the Bangalore team was ₹3 crore (US$354,843.60).) | 15 November 2018 | |
| Murugan Ashwin | India | ₹2.2 crore (US$260,218.60) | 15 November 2018 | |
| Manan Vohra | India | ₹1.1 crore (US$130,109.30) | 15 November 2018 | |
| Aniket Choudhary | India | ₹30 lakh (US$35,484.40) | 15 November 2018 | |
| Aniruddha Joshi | India | ₹20 lakh (US$23,656.20) | 15 November 2018 | |
| Pavan Deshpande | India | ₹20 lakh (US$23,656.20) | 15 November 2018 | |
| Corey Anderson^{[REP]} | New Zealand | ₹2 crore (US$236,562.40) | 15 November 2018 | |
Sunrisers Hyderabad
| Wriddhiman Saha | India | ₹5 crore (US$591,406.00) | 15 November 2018 | |
| Carlos Brathwaite | West Indies | ₹2 crore (US$236,562.40) | 15 November 2018 | |
| Chris Jordan | England | ₹1 crore (US$118,281.20) | 15 November 2018 | |
| Bipul Sharma | India | ₹20 lakh (US$23,656.20) | 15 November 2018 | |
| Mehdi Hasan | India | ₹20 lakh (US$23,656.20) | 15 November 2018 | |
| Sachin Baby | India | ₹20 lakh (US$23,656.20) | 15 November 2018 | |
| Tanmay Agarwal | India | ₹20 lakh (US$23,656.20) | 15 November 2018 | |
| Alex Hales^{[REP]} | England | ₹1 crore (US$118,281.20) | 15 November 2018 | |

^{REP} REP: Players who were unsold originally in 2018 auction but were later signed up as a replacement player.
^{RET} RET: Players who were retained by the teams before the 2018 auction.

=== Retained players ===
The team retentions were announced on 15 November 2018.

| Player | Nationality | Salary |
Chennai Super Kings
| Mahendra Singh Dhoni | India | ₹15 crore (US$1.8 million) |
| Suresh Raina | India | ₹11 crore (US$1.3 million) |
| Kedar Jadhav | India | ₹7.8 crore (US$922,593.40) |
| Ravindra Jadeja | India | ₹7 crore (US$827,968.40) |
| Dwayne Bravo | Trinidad and Tobago | ₹6.4 crore (US$756,999.70) |
| Karn Sharma | India | ₹5 crore (US$591,406.00) |
| Shane Watson | Australia | ₹4 crore (US$473,124.80) |
| Shardul Thakur | India | ₹2.6 crore (US$307,531.10) |
| Ambati Rayudu | India | ₹2.2 crore (US$260,218.60) |
| David Willey^{[REP]} | England | ₹2 crore (US$236,562.40) |
| Harbhajan Singh | India | ₹2 crore (US$236,562.40) |
| Murali Vijay | India | ₹2 crore (US$236,562.40) |
| Faf du Plessis | South Africa | ₹1.6 crore (US$189,249.90) |
| Imran Tahir | South Africa | ₹1 crore (US$118,281.20) |
| Sam Billings | England | ₹1 crore (US$118,281.20) |
| Deepak Chahar | India | ₹80 lakh (US$94,625.00) |
| Lungi Ngidi | South Africa | ₹50 lakh (US$59,140.60) |
| Mitchell Santner | New Zealand | ₹50 lakh (US$59,140.60) |
| KM Asif | India | ₹40 lakh (US$47,312.50) |
| Chaitanya Bishnoi | India | ₹20 lakh (US$23,656.20) |
| Dhruv Shorey | India | ₹20 lakh (US$23,656.20) |
| Monu Singh | India | ₹20 lakh (US$23,656.20) |
| Narayan Jagadeesan | India | ₹20 lakh (US$23,656.20) |
Delhi Capitals
| Rishabh Pant | India | ₹8 crore (US$946,249.60) (Note: Pant was retained at a salary of ₹8 crore (US$946,249.60) but as per the IPL rules, the actual purse deduction for the Delhi team was ₹15 crore (US$1.8 million).) |
| Chris Morris | South Africa | ₹7.1 crore (US$839,796.50) (Note: Morris was retained at a salary of ₹7.1 crore (US$839,796.50) but as per the IPL rules, the actual purse deduction for the Delhi team was ₹11 crore (US$1.3 million).) |
| Shreyas Iyer | India | ₹7 crore (US$827,968.40) |
| Kagiso Rabada | South Africa | ₹4.2 crore (US$496,781.00) |
| Amit Mishra | India | ₹4 crore (US$473,124.80) |
| Rahul Tewatia | India | ₹3 crore (US$354,843.60) |
| Trent Boult | New Zealand | ₹2.2 crore (US$260,218.60) |
| Colin Munro | New Zealand | ₹1.9 crore (US$224,734.30) |
| Prithvi Shaw | India | ₹1.2 crore (US$141,937.40) |
| Avesh Khan | India | ₹70 lakh (US$82,796.80) |
| Jayant Yadav^{[TRA]} | India | ₹50 lakh (US$59,140.60) |
| Harshal Patel | India | ₹20 lakh (US$23,656.20) |
| Manjot Kalra | India | ₹20 lakh (US$23,656.20) |
| Sandeep Lamichhane | Nepal | ₹20 lakh (US$23,656.20) |
Kings XI Punjab
| KL Rahul | India | ₹11 crore (US$1.3 million) |
| Ravichandran Ashwin | India | ₹7.6 crore (US$898,937.10) |
| Andrew Tye | Australia | ₹7.2 crore (US$851,624.60) |
| Karun Nair | India | ₹5.6 crore (US$662,374.70) |
| Mujeeb Ur Rahman | Afghanistan | ₹4 crore (US$473,124.80) |
| Ankit Rajpoot | India | ₹3 crore (US$354,843.60) |
| David Miller | South Africa | ₹3 crore (US$354,843.60) |
| Chris Gayle | Jamaica | ₹2 crore (US$236,562.40) |
| Mayank Agarwal | India | ₹1 crore (US$118,281.20) |
Kolkata Knight Riders
| Sunil Narine | Trinidad and Tobago | ₹8.5 crore (US$1.0 million) (Note: Narine was retained at a salary of ₹8.5 crore (US$1.0 million) but as per the IPL rules, the actual purse deduction for the Kolkata team was ₹12.5 crore (US$1.5 million).) |
| Chris Lynn | Australia | ₹9.6 crore (US$1.1 million) |
| Andre Russell | Jamaica | ₹7 crore (US$827,968.40) (Note: Russell was retained at a salary of ₹7 crore (US$827,968.40) but as per the IPL rules, the actual purse deduction for the Kolkata team was ₹8.5 crore (US$1.0 million).) |
| Dinesh Karthik | India | ₹7.4 crore (US$875,280.90) |
| Robin Uthappa | India | ₹6.4 crore (US$756,999.70) |
| Kuldeep Yadav | India | ₹5.8 crore (US$686,031.00) |
| Piyush Chawla | India | ₹4.2 crore (US$496,781.00) |
| Nitish Rana | India | ₹3.4 crore (US$402,156.10) |
| Kamlesh Nagarkoti | India | ₹3.2 crore (US$378,499.80) |
| Shivam Mavi | India | ₹3 crore (US$354,843.60) |
| Shubman Gill | India | ₹1.8 crore (US$212,906.20) |
| Rinku Singh | India | ₹80 lakh (US$94,625.00) |
| Prasidh Krishna | India | ₹20 lakh (US$23,656.20) |

| Player | Nationality | Salary |
Mumbai Indians
| Rohit Sharma | India | ₹15 crore (US$1.8 million) |
| Hardik Pandya | India | ₹11 crore (US$1.3 million) |
| Krunal Pandya | India | ₹8.8 crore (US$1.0 million) |
| Jasprit Bumrah | India | ₹7 crore (US$827,968.40) |
| Ishan Kishan | India | ₹6.2 crore (US$733,343.40) |
| Kieron Pollard | Trinidad and Tobago | ₹5.4 crore (US$638,718.50) |
| Evin Lewis | Trinidad and Tobago | ₹3.8 crore (US$449,468.60) |
| Suryakumar Yadav | India | ₹3.2 crore (US$378,499.80) |
| Ben Cutting | Australia | ₹2.2 crore (US$260,218.60) |
| Rahul Chahar | India | ₹1.9 crore (US$224,734.30) |
| Jason Behrendorff | Australia | ₹1.5 crore (US$177,421.80) (Note: Jason Behrendorff's salary was mentioned as ₹1 crore (US$118,281.20) in the official retention list (on IPL website) though he was auctioned at the amount of ₹1.5 crore (US$177,421.80) in the 2018 auction.) |
| Mitchell McClenaghan | New Zealand | ₹1 crore (US$118,281.20) |
| Adam Milne | New Zealand | ₹75 lakh (US$88,710.90) |
| Aditya Tare | India | ₹20 lakh (US$23,656.20) |
| Anukul Roy | India | ₹20 lakh (US$23,656.20) |
| Mayank Markande | India | ₹20 lakh (US$23,656.20) |
| Siddhesh Lad | India | ₹20 lakh (US$23,656.20) |
Rajasthan Royals
| Ben Stokes | England | ₹12.5 crore (US$1.5 million) |
| Steve Smith | Australia | ₹12 crore (US$1.4 million) (Note: Smith was retained at a salary of ₹12 crore (US$1.4 million) but as per the IPL rules, the actual purse deduction for the Rajasthan team was ₹12.5 crore (US$1.5 million).) |
| Sanju Samson | India | ₹8 crore (US$946,249.60) |
| Jofra Archer | Barbados | ₹7.2 crore (US$851,624.60) |
| Krishnappa Gowtham | India | ₹6.2 crore (US$733,343.40) |
| Jos Buttler | England | ₹4.4 crore (US$520,437.30) |
| Ajinkya Rahane | India | ₹4 crore (US$473,124.80) |
| Rahul Tripathi | India | ₹3.4 crore (US$402,156.10) |
| Dhawal Kulkarni | India | ₹75 lakh (US$88,710.90) |
| Ish Sodhi | New Zealand | ₹50 lakh (US$59,140.60) |
| Stuart Binny | India | ₹50 lakh (US$59,140.60) |
| Aryaman Birla | India | ₹30 lakh (US$35,484.40) |
| Mahipal Lomror | India | ₹20 lakh (US$23,656.20) |
| Prashant Chopra | India | ₹20 lakh (US$23,656.20) |
| Shreyas Gopal | India | ₹20 lakh (US$23,656.20) |
| Sudhesan Midhun | India | ₹20 lakh (US$23,656.20) |
Royal Challengers Bangalore
| Virat Kohli | India | ₹17 crore (US$2.0 million) |
| AB de Villiers | South Africa | ₹11 crore (US$1.3 million) |
| Yuzvendra Chahal | India | ₹6 crore (US$709,687.20) |
| Umesh Yadav | India | ₹4.2 crore (US$496,781.00) |
| Washington Sundar | India | ₹3.2 crore (US$378,499.80) |
| Navdeep Saini | India | ₹3 crore (US$354,843.60) |
| Mohammed Siraj | India | ₹2.6 crore (US$307,531.10) |
| Colin de Grandhomme | New Zealand | ₹2.2 crore (US$260,218.60) |
| Nathan Coulter-Nile | Australia | ₹2.2 crore (US$260,218.60) |
| Moeen Ali | England | ₹1.7 crore (US$201,078.00) |
| Parthiv Patel | India | ₹1.7 crore (US$201,078.00) |
| Pawan Negi | India | ₹1 crore (US$118,281.20) |
| Tim Southee | New Zealand | ₹1 crore (US$118,281.20) |
| Kulwant Khejroliya | India | ₹85 lakh (US$100,539.00) |
Sunrisers Hyderabad
| David Warner | Australia | ₹12 crore (US$1.4 million) (Note: Warner was retained at a salary of ₹12 crore (US$1.4 million) but as per IPL rules, the actual purse deduction for the Hyderabad team was ₹12.5 crore (US$1.5 million).) |
| Manish Pandey | India | ₹11 crore (US$1.3 million) |
| Rashid Khan | Afghanistan | ₹9 crore (US$1.1 million) |
| Bhuvneshwar Kumar | India | ₹8.5 crore (US$1.0 million) |
| Siddarth Kaul | India | ₹3.8 crore (US$449,468.60) |
| Deepak Hooda | India | ₹3.6 crore (US$425,812.30) |
| Kane Williamson | New Zealand | ₹3 crore (US$354,843.60) |
| Khaleel Ahmed | India | ₹3 crore (US$354,843.60) |
| Sandeep Sharma | India | ₹3 crore (US$354,843.60) |
| Shakib Al Hasan | Bangladesh | ₹2 crore (US$236,562.40) |
| Yusuf Pathan | India | ₹1.9 crore (US$224,734.30) |
| Mohammad Nabi | Afghanistan | ₹1 crore (US$118,281.20) |
| Shreevats Goswami | India | ₹1 crore (US$118,281.20) |
| Basil Thampi | India | ₹95 lakh (US$112,367.10) |
| Billy Stanlake | Australia | ₹50 lakh (US$59,140.60) |
| Thangarasu Natarajan | India | ₹40 lakh (US$47,312.50) |
| Ricky Bhui | India | ₹20 lakh (US$23,656.20) |

^{TRA} : Players who were traded after the 2019 auction.

=== Summary ===
Pre-Auction summary
| Team | Retained | | Transfers In | | Released | | Transfers Out | | Funds Remaining | Player Slots Remaining (Max) | |
| Team | Players | Amount | Players | Amount | Players | Amount | Players | Amount | Funds Remaining | Overall | Overseas |
|---|---|---|---|---|---|---|---|---|---|---|---|
| Chennai | 23 | ₹73.6 crore (US$8.7 million) | 0 | — | 3 | ₹1.9 crore (US$224,734.30) | 0 | — | ₹8.40 crore (US$993,562.10) | 2 | 0 |
| Delhi | 14 | ₹51.3 crore (US$6.1 million) | 1 | ₹5.2 crore (US$615,062.20) | 10 | ₹22.35 crore (US$2.6 million) | 3 | ₹6.95 crore (US$822,054.30) | ₹25.50 crore (US$3.0 million) | 10 | 3 |
| Punjab | 9 | ₹44.4 crore (US$5.3 million) | 1 | ₹1.4 crore (US$165,593.70) | 11 | ₹23.55 crore (US$2.8 million) | 1 | ₹6.2 crore (US$733,343.40) | ₹36.20 crore (US$4.3 million) | 15 | 4 |
| Kolkata | 13 | ₹66.8 crore (US$7.9 million) | 0 | — | 8 | ₹15.02 crore (US$1.8 million) | 0 | — | ₹15.20 crore (US$1.8 million) | 12 | 5 |
| Mumbai | 17 | ₹68.55 crore (US$8.1 million) | 1 | ₹2.8 crore (US$331,187.40) | 10 | ₹13.55 crore (US$1.6 million) | 0 | — | ₹11.15 crore (US$1.3 million) | 7 | 1 |
| Rajasthan | 16 | ₹61.05 crore (US$7.2 million) | 0 | — | 9 | ₹18.3 crore (US$2.2 million) | 0 | — | ₹20.95 crore (US$2.5 million) | 9 | 3 |
| Bangalore | 14 | ₹57.65 crore (US$6.8 million) | 1 | ₹6.2 crore (US$733,343.40) | 9 | ₹18.75 crore (US$2.2 million) | 2 | ₹4.2 crore (US$496,781.00) | ₹18.15 crore (US$2.1 million) | 10 | 2 |
| Hyderabad | 17 | ₹65.35 crore (US$7.7 million) | 3 | ₹6.95 crore (US$822,054.30) | 8 | ₹9.8 crore (US$1.2 million) | 1 | ₹5.2 crore (US$615,062.20) | ₹9.7 crore (US$1.1 million) | 5 | 2 |

Maximum overseas players: 9; Squad size- Min:18 and Max:25; Budget:₹82 crore

== Auction ==
The player auction was held on 18 December 2018 at Jaipur. The auction was reckoned to be affected by limited availability of foreign players due to the 2019 Cricket World Cup. Initially 1003 players submitted their names for auction and the franchises were asked to submit their final shortlist by 10 December. 346 players were shortlisted. 5 more players were added to list on auction day making the final list to 351 including 228 Indian players. Ten players have listed themselves at the base price of Rs. 2 crore. 60 players were sold and amount of Rs.106.8 crore was spent in the auction. Jaydev Unadkat and uncapped Varun Chakravarthy were the costliest players at Rs.8.4 crore. Sam Curran was the most expensive foreign player at Rs. 7.2 crore. Prominent players like Cheteshwar Pujara, Brendon McCullum and Alex Hales remained unsold.

=== Summary ===
Team summary
| Team | Funds Remaining (₹ in Lacs) | In Auction | | | Overall (including Retained) | | |
| Team | Funds Remaining (₹ in Lacs) | Uncapped Players | Overseas Players | Total Players | Uncapped Players | Overseas Players | Total Players |
|---|---|---|---|---|---|---|---|
| Chennai | 320 | 1 | 0 | 2 | 6 | 8 | 25 |
| Delhi | 770 | 5 | 3 | 10 | 9 | 8 | 25 |
| Punjab | 370 | 8 | 4 | 13 | 10 | 8 | 23 |
| Kolkata | 605 | 4 | 5 | 8 | 10 | 8 | 21 |
| Mumbai | 355 | 3 | 1 | 6 | 10 | 8 | 25 |
| Rajasthan | 715 | 4 | 3 | 9 | 12 | 8 | 25 |
| Bangalore | 180 | 6 | 2 | 9 | 6 | 8 | 24 |
| Hyderabad | 530 | 0 | 2 | 3 | 5 | 8 | 23 |

=== Sold players ===
| Name | Country | Playing Role | IPL Matches | Capped / Uncapped /Associate | Reserve Price (in ₹ Lacs) | IPL 2019 Team | Auctioned Price (in ₹ Lacs) | IPL 2018 Team | IPL Team(s) |
|---|---|---|---|---|---|---|---|---|---|
| Hanuma Vihari | India | Batsman | 22 | Capped | 50 | Delhi Capitals | 200 | | Sunrisers Hyderabad |
| Shimron Hetmyer | Guyana | Batsman | | Capped | 50 | Royal Challengers Bangalore | 420 | | |
| Carlos Brathwaite | Barbados | All-rounder | 14 | Capped | 75 | Kolkata Knight Riders | 500 | Sunrisers Hyderabad | Sunrisers Hyderabad, Delhi Daredevils |
| Gurkeerat Singh | India | All-rounder | 30 | Capped | 50 | Royal Challengers Bangalore | 50 | Delhi Daredevils* | Delhi Daredevils, Kings XI Punjab |
| Moises Henriques | Australia | All-rounder | 57 | Capped | 100 | Kings XI Punjab | 100 | | Sunrisers Hyderabad, Delhi Daredevils, Kolkata Knight Riders, Royal Challengers Bangalore, Mumbai Indians |
| Axar Patel | India | All-rounder | 68 | Capped | 100 | Delhi Capitals | 500 | Kings XI Punjab | Kings XI Punjab, Mumbai Indians |
| Jonny Bairstow | England | Wicketkeeper | | Capped | 150 | Sunrisers Hyderabad | 220 | | |
| Nicholas Pooran | Trinidad and Tobago | Wicketkeeper | 0 | Capped | 75 | Kings XI Punjab | 420 | | Mumbai Indians |
| Wriddhiman Saha | India | Wicketkeeper | 115 | Capped | 100 | Sunrisers Hyderabad | 120 | Sunrisers Hyderabad | Sunrisers Hyderabad, Kings XI Punjab, Chennai Super Kings, Kolkata Knight Riders |
| Jaydev Unadkat | India | Bowler | 62 | Capped | 150 | Rajasthan Royals | 840 | Rajasthan Royals | Kolkata Knight Riders, Delhi Daredevils, Royal Challengers Bangalore, Rising Pune Supergiant, Rajasthan Royals |
| Ishant Sharma | India | Bowler | 76 | Capped | 75 | Delhi Capitals | 110 | | Rising Pune Supergiant, Deccan Chargers, Kings XI Punjab, Kolkata Knight Riders, Sunrisers Hyderabad |
| Lasith Malinga | Sri Lanka | Bowler | 110 | Capped | 200 | Mumbai Indians | 200 | | Mumbai Indians |
| Mohammad Shami | India | Bowler | 35 | Capped | 100 | Kings XI Punjab | 480 | Delhi Daredevils | Delhi Daredevils, Kolkata Knight Riders |
| Varun Aaron | India | Bowler | 42 | Capped | 50 | Rajasthan Royals | 240 | | Royal Challengers Bangalore, Kolkata Knight Riders, Delhi Daredevils, Kings XI Punjab |
| Mohit Sharma | India | Bowler | 84 | Capped | 50 | Chennai Super Kings | 500 | Kings XI Punjab | Kings XI Punjab, Chennai Super Kings |
| Devdutt Padikkal | India | Batsman | | Uncapped | 20 | Royal Challengers Bangalore | 20 | | |
| Anmolpreet Singh | India | Batsman | | Uncapped | 20 | Mumbai Indians | 80 | | |
| Sarfaraz Khan | India | All-rounder | 25 | Uncapped | 20 | Kings XI Punjab | 25 | Royal Challengers Bangalore | Royal Challengers Bangalore |
| Shivam Dube | India | All-rounder | | Uncapped | 20 | Royal Challengers Bangalore | 500 | | |
| Varun Chakravarthy | India | All-rounder | | Uncapped | 20 | Kings XI Punjab | 840 | | |
| Ankush Bains | India | Wicketkeeper | 0 | Uncapped | 20 | Delhi Capitals | 20 | | Chennai Super Kings, Rajasthan Royals, Rising Pune Supergiants |
| Nathu Singh | India | Bowler | 2 | Uncapped | 20 | Delhi Capitals | 20 | | Mumbai Indians, Gujarat Lions |
| Colin Ingram | South Africa | Batsman | 3 | Capped | 200 | Delhi Capitals | 640 | | Delhi Daredevils |
| Sam Curran | England | All-rounder | | Capped | 200 | Kings XI Punjab | 720 | | |
| Heinrich Klaasen | South Africa | Wicketkeeper | 4 | Capped | 50 | Royal Challengers Bangalore | 50 | Rajasthan Royals | Rajasthan Royals |
| Barinder Sran | India | Bowler | 22 | Capped | 50 | Mumbai Indians | 340 | Kings XI Punjab | Kings XI Punjab, Rajasthan Royals, Sunrisers Hyderabad |
| Lockie Ferguson | New Zealand | Bowler | 4 | Capped | 100 | Kolkata Knight Riders | 160 | | Rising Pune Supergiant |
| Sherfane Rutherford^{[ACC]} | Guyana | All-rounder | | Uncapped | 40 | Delhi Capitals | 200 | | |
| Anrich Nortje^{[ACC]} | South Africa | Bowler | | Uncapped | 20 | Kolkata Knight Riders | 20 | | |
| Oshane Thomas^{[ACC]} | Jamaica | Bowler | | Capped | 50 | Rajasthan Royals | 110 | | |
| Hardus Viljoen^{[ACC]} | South Africa | Bowler | | Capped | 75 | Kings XI Punjab | 75 | | |
| Himmat Singh^{[ACC]} | India | Batsman | | Uncapped | 20 | Royal Challengers Bangalore | 65 | | |
| Nikhil Naik^{[ACC]} | India | Wicketkeeper | 2 | Uncapped | 20 | Kolkata Knight Riders | 20 | | Kings XI Punjab |
| Arshdeep Singh^{[ACC]} | India | Bowler | | Uncapped | 20 | Kings XI Punjab | 20 | | |
| Harry Gurney^{[ACC]} | England | Bowler | | Capped | 75 | Kolkata Knight Riders | 75 | | |
| Pankaj Jaiswal^{[ACC]} | India | All-rounder | | Uncapped | 20 | Mumbai Indians | 20 | | |
| Milind Kumar^{[ACC]} | India | All-rounder | 0 | Uncapped | 20 | Royal Challengers Bangalore | 20 | | Delhi Daredevils |
| Darshan Nalkande^{[ACC]} | India | All-rounder | | Uncapped | 20 | Kings XI Punjab | 30 | | |
| Shashank Singh^{[ACC]} | India | All-rounder | 0 | Uncapped | 20 | Rajasthan Royals | 30 | | Delhi Daredevils |
| Prab Simran Singh^{[ACC]} | India | Wicketkeeper | | Uncapped | 20 | Kings XI Punjab | 480 | | |
| Rasikh Salam^{[ACC]} | India | Bowler | | Uncapped | 20 | Mumbai Indians | 20 | | |
| Prithvi Raj Yarra^{[ACC]} | India | Bowler | | Uncapped | 20 | Kolkata Knight Riders | 20 | | |
| Liam Livingstone^{[ACC]} | England | All-rounder | | Capped | 50 | Rajasthan Royals | 50 | | |
| Keemo Paul^{[ACC]} | Guyana | All-rounder | | Capped | 50 | Delhi Capitals | 50 | | |
| Prayas Ray Barman^{[ACC]} | India | All-rounder | | Uncapped | 20 | Royal Challengers Bangalore | 150 | | |
| Agnivesh Ayachi^{[ACC]} | India | All-rounder | | Uncapped | 20 | Kings XI Punjab | 20 | | |
| Harpreet Brar^{[ACC]} | India | All-rounder | | Uncapped | 20 | Kings XI Punjab | 20 | | |
| Martin Guptill^{[REC-1]} | New Zealand | Batsman | 10 | Capped | 100 | Sunrisers Hyderabad | 100 | | Kings XI Punjab, Mumbai Indians |
| Yuvraj Singh^{[REC-1]} | India | All-rounder | 128 | Capped | 100 | Mumbai Indians | 100 | Kings XI Punjab | Sunrisers Hyderabad, Delhi Daredevils, Kings XI Punjab, Royal Challengers Bangalore, Pune Warriors |
| Akshdeep Nath^{[REC-1]} | India | All-rounder | 6 | Uncapped | 20 | Royal Challengers Bangalore | 360 | Kings XI Punjab | Kings XI Punjab. Gujarat Lions |
| Jalaj Saxena^{[REC-2]} | India | All-rounder | 0 | Uncapped | 20 | Delhi Capitals | 20 | | Mumbai Indians, Royal Challengers Bangalore |
| Murugan Ashwin^{[REC-2]} | India | Bowler | 12 | Uncapped | 20 | Kings XI Punjab | 20 | Royal Challengers Bangalore | Royal Challengers Bangalore, Delhi Daredevils, Rising Pune Supergiant |
| Ruturaj Gaikwad^{[DI-REC-2]} | India | Batsman | | Uncapped | 20 | Chennai Super Kings | 20 | | |
| Shubham Ranjane^{[ACC]}^{[REC-2]} | India | All-rounder | | Uncapped | 20 | Rajasthan Royals | 20 | | |
| Joe Denly^{[ACC]}^{[REC-2]} | England | Batsman | | Capped | 100 | Kolkata Knight Riders | 100 | | |
| Bandaru Ayyappa^{[DI-REC-2]} | India | Bowler | | Uncapped | 20 | Delhi Capitals | 20 | | |
| Shrikant Mundhe^{[ACC]}^{[REC-2]} | India | All-rounder | 1 | Uncapped | 20 | Kolkata Knight Riders | 20 | | Pune Warriors |
| Manan Vohra^{[REC-3]} | India | Batsman | 49 | Uncapped | 20 | Rajasthan Royals | 20 | Royal Challengers Bangalore | Royal Challengers Bangalore, Kings XI Punjab |
| Ashton Turner^{[ACC]}^{[REC-3]} | Australia | All-rounder | | Capped | 50 | Rajasthan Royals | 50 | | |
| Riyan Parag^{[DI-REC-3]} | India | All-rounder | | Uncapped | 20 | Rajasthan Royals | 20 | | |

Source:Vivo IPL 2019 Player Auction

^{ACC} ACC: Players who were part of accelerated bidding.
^{REC} REC-1/2/3: Players unsold originally but brought back for Recall Round-1, 2 or 3.
^{DI-REC} DI-REC-2/3: Players not called in accelerated process but were brought back for Recall Round-2 or 3.
* : Players were in the squad for the season but did not play any match.
0 : Players mentioned as 0 in IPL matches column were part of the squad but did not play any matches.

== Post-auction trading ==
A trading window opened after the auction took place with a deadline of 5:00PM 30 days prior to the start of the 2019 season.

| Player | Nationality | Salary | From | To | Date | Ref |
|---|---|---|---|---|---|---|
| Jayant Yadav | India | ₹50 lakh (US$59,140.60) | Delhi Capitals | Mumbai Indians | 20 December 2018 | |

== Withdrawn players ==
The following players withdrew from the tournament either due to injuries or because of other reasons.

| Player | Team | Auctioned/Retention Price | Reason | Announcement date | Replacement Player | Replacement Player's Price | Replacement Player's Base Price | Signing date | Ref |
|---|---|---|---|---|---|---|---|---|---|
| Shivam Mavi | Kolkata Knight Riders | ₹3 crore (US$354,843.60) | Back Stress fracture | 14 March 2019 | K C Cariappa | | ₹20 lakh (US$23,656.20) | 17 March 2019 | |
| Kamlesh Nagarkoti | Kolkata Knight Riders | ₹3.2 crore (US$378,499.80) | Back injury | 14 March 2019 | Sandeep Warrier | ₹20 lakh (US$23,656.20) | ₹20 lakh (US$23,656.20) | 17 March 2019 | |
| Anrich Nortje | Kolkata Knight Riders | ₹20 lakh (US$23,656.20) | Shoulder injury | 20 March 2019 | Matthew Kelly | | | 11 April 2019 | |
| Lungi Ngidi | Chennai Super Kings | ₹50 lakh (US$59,140.60) | Side-strain injury | 20 March 2019 | Scott Kuggeleijn | | | 30 March 2019 | |
| Adam Milne | Mumbai Indians | ₹75 lakh (US$88,710.90) | Swollen heel | 22 March 2019 | Alzarri Joseph | | | 28 March 2019 | |
| David Willey | Chennai Super Kings | ₹2 crore (US$236,562.40) | Family reasons | 29 March 2019 | | | | | |
| Harshal Patel | Delhi Capitals | ₹20 lakh (US$23,656.20) | Right Hand Fracture | 11 April 2019 | Jagadeesha Suchith | | ₹20 lakh (US$23,656.20) | 13 April 2019 | |
| Nathan Coulter-Nile | Royal Challengers Bangalore | ₹2.2 crore (US$260,218.60) | Stiff Back | 11 April 2019 | Dale Steyn | | ₹1.50 crore (US$177,421.80) | 12 April 2019 | |
| Alzarri Joseph | Mumbai Indians | | Shoulder dislocation | 15 April 2019 | Beuran Hendricks | | | 23 April 2019 | |
| Dale Steyn | Royal Challengers Bangalore | | Shoulder inflammation | 25 April 2019 | | | | | |
| Varun Chakravarthy | Kings XI Punjab | ₹8.4 crore (US$993,562.10) | Finger injury | 1 May 2019 | | | | | |
| Kagiso Rabada | Delhi Capitals | ₹4.2 crore (US$496,781.00) | Back niggle | 3 May 2019 | | | | | |
| Kedar Jadhav | Chennai Super Kings | ₹7.8 crore (US$922,593.40) | Shoulder injury | 5 May 2019 | | | | | |

== Support staff changes ==
| Staff | Team | Change | Role | Announcement date | Note | Ref |
|---|---|---|---|---|---|---|
| Brad Hodge | Kings XI Punjab | Parted Ways | Head coach | 20 August 2018 | | |
| Daniel Vettori | Royal Challengers Bangalore | Sacked | Head coach | 24 August 2018 | | |
| Trent Woodhill | Royal Challengers Bangalore | Sacked | Batting and Fielding coach | 24 August 2018 | | |
| Andrew McDonald | Royal Challengers Bangalore | Sacked | Bowling coach | 24 August 2018 | | |
| Gary Kirsten | Royal Challengers Bangalore | Appointed (Promoted) | Head coach | 30 August 2018 | Promoted from Batting Coach and replaced Daniel Vettori | |
| Pravin Amre | Delhi Capitals | Role Changed | Assistant coach to Talent Scout | 19 October 2018 | | |
| Mohammad Kaif | Delhi Capitals | Appointed | Assistant coach (Note: According to news on 19 October, Kaif was appointed as talent scout but on 9 November it was announced that he has been appointed as the assistant coach.) | 19 October 2018 | Replaced Pravin Amre | |
| Mike Hesson | Kings XI Punjab | Appointed | Head coach | 28 October 2018 | Replaced Brad Hodge | |
| Virender Sehwag | Kings XI Punjab | Parted ways | Mentor | 3 November 2018 | | |
| Venkatesh Prasad | Kings XI Punjab | Parted ways | Bowling coach | 5 November 2018 | | |
| Sridharan Sriram | Kings XI Punjab | Appointed | Batting coach (Note: According to news on 5 November, Sridharan Sriram was appointed as bowling coach but on 5 December it was announced that he has been appointed as the batting coach.) | 5 November 2018 | | |
| Prasanna Agoram | Kings XI Punjab | Appointed | High-performance coach | 5 November 2018 | | |
| Steffan Jones | Rajasthan Royals | Appointed | Fast Bowling coach | 29 November 2018 | | |
| Ryan Harris | Kings XI Punjab | Appointed | Bowling coach | 5 December 2018 | Replaced Venkatesh Prasad | |
| Craig McMillan | Kings XI Punjab | Appointed | Fielding coach | 5 December 2018 | | |
| Lasith Malinga | Mumbai Indians | Left | Mentor | 6 December 2018 | Listed himself as player for the auction | |
| Zaheer Khan | Mumbai Indians | Appointed | Director of Cricket Operations | 18 December 2018 | | |
| Paddy Upton | Rajasthan Royals | Appointed | Head coach | 13 January 2019 | | |
| Mithun Manhas | Royal Challengers Bangalore | Appointed | Assistant coach | 13 February 2019 | | |
| Sourav Ganguly | Delhi Capitals | Appointed | Advisor | 14 March 2019 | | |
| Samuel Badree | Delhi Capitals | Appointed | Spin bowling Coach | 18 March 2019 | | |
