= Sanjay Budhwar =

Indian cricketer (born 1987)

Personal information
- Born: 2 October 1987 (age 39); Sunaria, Haryana, India
- Source: Cricinfo, 4 October 2015

Sanjay Budhwar (born 8 October 1987) is an Indian first-class cricketer who plays for Haryana.
