= Ankit Bawne =

Indian cricketer

Personal information
- Full name: Ankit Ramdas Bawne
- Born: 17 December 1992 (age 33); Paithan, Maharashtra, India
- Batting: Right-handed
- Bowling: Right-arm off break
- Role: Batsman

Domestic team information
- Years: Team
- 2007/08–present: Maharashtra
- 2017: Delhi Daredevils (squad no. 17)

Career statistics
Competition	FC	LA	T20
Matches	89	73	22
Runs scored	5,890	2,409	488
Batting average	50.77	42.26	30.50
100s/50s	17/32	7/9	0/3
Top score	258*	117*	90*
Balls bowled	428	408	78
Wickets	4	6	3
Bowling average	68.75	52.50	30.00
5 wickets in innings	0	0	0
10 wickets in match	0	0	0
Best bowling	2/25	2/28	2/12
Catches/stumpings	25/–	14/–	3/–
- Source: ESPNcricinfo, 15 January 2019

Ankit Ramdas Bawne (born 17 December 1992) is an Indian cricketer who plays for Maharashtra in Indian domestic cricket. A right-handed middle-order batsman with a first-class average of over 50, he has represented India Under-23s and West Zone.

Bawne made his first-class debut only a week after his 15th birthday in 2007 against Karnataka. He won the 'Best Under-15 Cricketer' award at the BCCI Awards in 2009.

== Career ==
Bawne averaged 60.30 in 2012–13 Ranji Trophy making more than 600 runs including five scores in excess of fifty in succession. He made 58 and 55 against Delhi and an unbeaten 155 against Karnataka. He was selected in the West Zone squad for the 2013–14 Duleep Trophy in which he batted at number 3 and made an unbeaten 115 against South Zone.

Bawne was among the top run-getters in 2013–14 Ranji Trophy with 731 runs at an average of 66.45, helping his team reach the Ranji final for the first time since 1992–93. He scored 84 in the quarterfinal against defending champions Mumbai after Maharashtra were 24 for 3, and helped Maharashtra win the match and knock Mumbai out. He followed it up with 89 against Bengal on a spicy pitch in the semifinal. In the final against Karnataka, he scored 89 and 61, becoming one of the few players to score four 50-plus scores in succession in Ranji Trophy knockout stage.

He played for West Zone in the 2014–15 Duleep Trophy and top-scored for his team with 105 against East Zone. In the 2014–15 Vijay Hazare Trophy, Bawne scored 297 runs in 4 matches at an average of 297 and strike rate of 86. His knocks included 102 not out against Baroda, 78 not out against Mumbai and 110 not out against Saurashtra.

Bawne scored 598 runs in the 2014–15 Ranji Trophy. He top-scored with 124 against Saurashtra in an innings victory; as well as 54 and 100 not out against Gujarat. His 100 not out against Vidarbha in the final group match helped Maharashtra win the match and qualify for the knockout stage.

At the 2015–16 Ranji Trophy, Bawne hit 172 in the opening match against Haryana. He also made 60 and 44 against Orissa, 65 against Bengal and 87 not out against defending champions Karnataka.

In the 2016–17 Ranji Trophy he made a 594 run partnership with Swapnil Gugale, the second-highest partnership in first-class cricket and the highest partnership in the history of the Ranji Trophy.

In February 2017, he was bought by the Delhi Daredevils team for the 2017 Indian Premier League for 10 lakhs.

He was the leading run-scorer for Maharashtra in the 2018–19 Vijay Hazare Trophy, with 328 runs in seven matches. In October 2018, he was named in India A's squad for the 2018–19 Deodhar Trophy.

In August 2019, he was named in the India Blue team's squad for the 2019–20 Duleep Trophy.

== Playing style ==
Bawne's technique has been widely praised in domestic circles. Maharashtra coach Surendra Bhave said in 2014, "Look at his front-foot stride. I can't see anyone else who has a front-foot stride as big as that against fast bowlers. Middles everything, bat sounds very sweet, and he gives us solidity, real solidity." He is known for scoring runs in "tricky situations" and as "a go-to man for Maharashtra in times of crises."
