= Agnivesh Ayachi =

Indian cricketer (born 1995)

Personal information
- Born: 15 June 1995 (age 31)
- Batting: Right-handed
- Bowling: Right arm medium
- Role: Bowler

Domestic team information
- Years: Team
- 2016/17–2019/20: Saurashtra
- 2024/25: Arunachal Pradesh
- Source: ESPNcricinfo, 1 March 2017

Agnivesh Ayachi (born 15 June 1995) is an Indian cricketer. He made his List A debut for Saurashtra in the 2016–17 Vijay Hazare Trophy on 1 March 2017.

In December 2018, he was bought by the Kings XI Punjab in the player auction for the 2019 Indian Premier League. He was released by the Kings XI Punjab ahead of the 2020 IPL auction.
