= Nikit Dhumal =

Indian cricketer (born 1991)

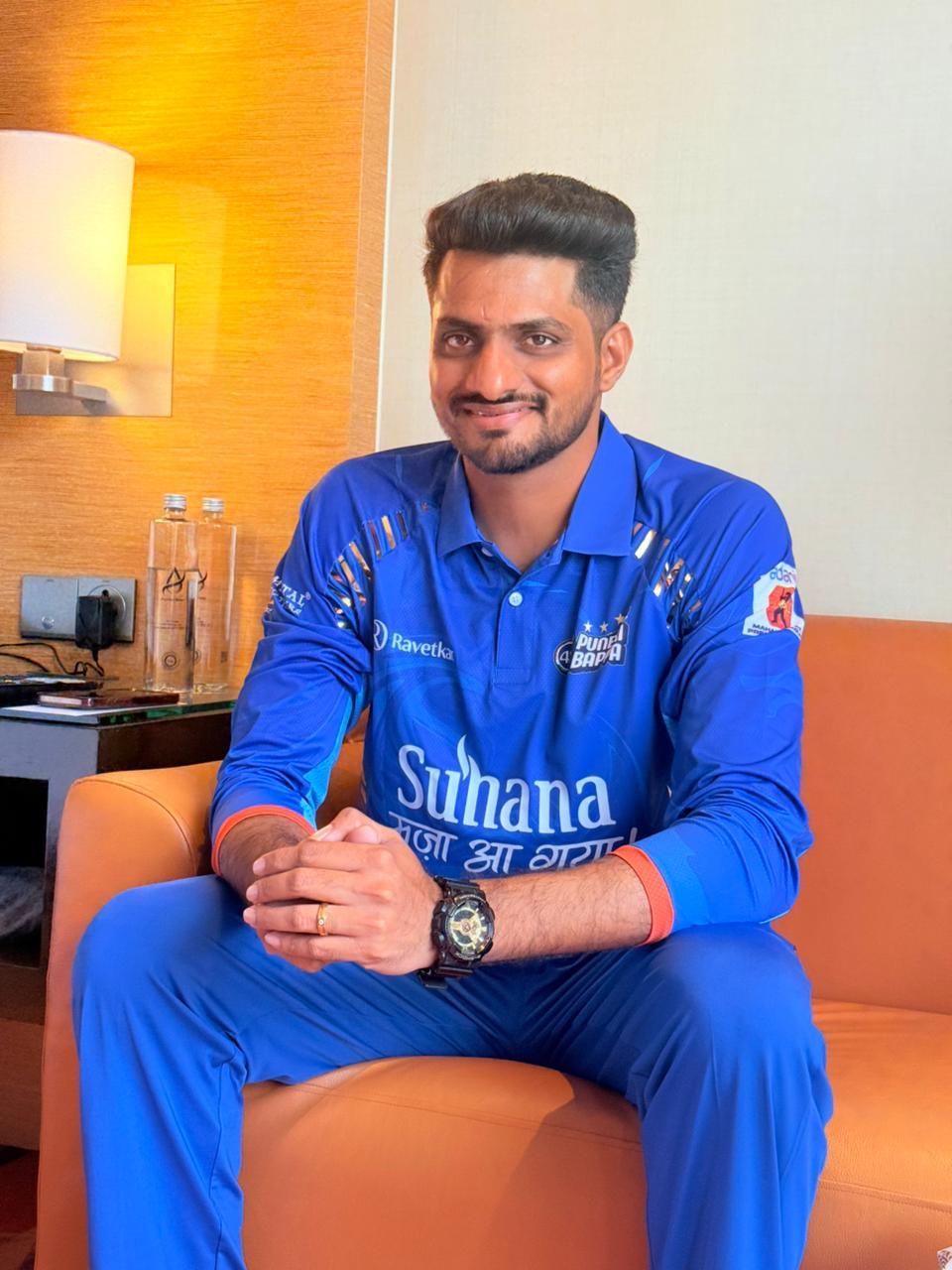

Personal information
- Born: 4 July 1991 (age 35); Pune, India
- Source: ESPNcricinfo, 7 October 2015

Nikit Dhumal (born 4 July 1991) is an Indian first-class cricketer who plays for Maharashtra. He made his Twenty20 debut for Maharashtra in the 2016–17 Inter State Twenty-20 Tournament on 4 February 2017.
