= Jayanta Behera =

Indian cricketer (born 1986)

Personal information
- Full name: Jayanta Bijaya Behera
- Born: 25 December 1986 (age 39); Cuttack, India
- Source: ESPNcricinfo, 6 October 2015

Jayanta Behera (born 25 December 1986) is an Indian first-class cricketer who plays for Odisha.
