= Rahul Hazarika =

Indian cricketer (born 1993)

Personal information
- Full name: Rahul Gautam Hazarika
- Born: 31 May 1993 (age 33); Guwahati, Assam, India
- Batting: Left-handed
- Bowling: Right-arm offbreak
- Role: Opening batter

Domestic team information
- Years: Team
- 2015–present: Assam
- Source: Cricinfo, 12 December 2015

Rahul Hazarika (born 31 May 1993) is an Indian cricketer who plays for Assam and is a left-handed opening batter. He made his first-class debut on 7 November 2015, against Haryana at Rohtak in the 2015–16 Ranji Trophy. He made his List A debut on 25 September 2019, for Assam in the 2019–20 Vijay Hazare Trophy.
