= Puneet Yadav =

Indian cricketer (born 1987)

Personal information
- Born: 12 August 1987 (age 39); Jaipur, Rajasthan, India
- Source: Cricinfo, 6 October 2015

Puneet Yadav (born 12 August 1987) is an Indian first-class cricketer who plays for Rajasthan.
