= Suryakant Pradhan =

Indian cricketer (born 1993)

Personal information
- Full name: Suryakant Basudev Pradhan
- Born: 30 September 1993 (age 33); Khordha, Odisha, India
- Batting: Right handed
- Bowling: Right arm medium

Domestic team information
- Years: Team
- 2017–18: Odisha
- Source: Cricinfo, 6 October 2015

Suryakant Pradhan (born 30 September 1993) is an Indian first-class cricketer who plays for Odisha. He was the leading wicket-taker for Odisha in the 2017–18 Ranji Trophy, with 14 dismissals in six matches.
