= Priyank Tehlan =

Indian cricketer (born 1988)

Personal information
- Born: 11 September 1988 (age 38); Delhi, India
- Source: Cricinfo, 4 October 2015

Priyank Tehlan (born 11 September 1988) is an Indian first-class cricketer who plays for Haryana.
