= Sarang Rawat =

Indian cricketer (born 1995)

Personal information
- Born: 9 November 1995 (age 31); Delhi, India
- Source: Cricinfo, 11 October 2015

Sarang Rawat (born 9 November 1995) is an Indian first-class cricketer who plays for Delhi. He made his Twenty20 debut on 4 January 2016 in the 2015–16 Syed Mushtaq Ali Trophy.
