= Ravi Jangid =

Indian cricketer (born 1987)

Personal information
- Born: 3 June 1987 (age 39); Rajasthan, India
- Source: Cricinfo, 6 October 2015

Ravi Jangid (born 3 June 1987) is an Indian first-class cricketer who plays for Vidarbha.
