= Rahul Dagar =

Indian cricketer (born 1993)

Personal information
- Born: 4 July 1993 (age 33); Faridabad, Hariyana
- Batting: Right handed
- Bowling: Right arm offbreak

Domestic team information
- Years: Team
- 2015–16: Haryana
- Source: Cricinfo, 4 October 2015

Rahul Dagar (born 4 July 1993) is an Indian first-class cricketer who plays for Haryana. He made his Twenty20 debut on 2 January 2016 in the 2015–16 Syed Mushtaq Ali Trophy.
