= Sangram Atitkar =

Indian cricketer (born 1988)

Personal information
- Full name: Sangram Diliprao Atitkar
- Born: 23 January 1988 (age 38); Kolhapur, Maharashtra, India
- Batting: Right-handed
- Bowling: Right-arm off break
- Role: Batsman

Domestic team information
- Years: Team
- 2009–2015: Maharashtra

Career statistics
Competition	FC	LA	T20
Matches	44	20	9
Runs scored	2,553	434	96
Batting average	41.85	27.12	10.66
100s/50s	4/14	0/3	0/0
Top score	190	89	33
Balls bowled	737	58	54
Wickets	4	1	4
Bowling average	81.25	78.00	20.00
5 wickets in innings	0	0	0
10 wickets in match	0	0	0
Best bowling	1/10	1/27	1/6
Catches/stumpings	39/–	8/–	5/–
- Source: Cricinfo, 13 June 2026

Sangram Diliprao Atitkar (born 23 January 1988) is an Indian former cricketer who played for Maharashtra in domestic cricket. He is a right-handed middle-order batsman and right-arm off break bowler.

He played for Income Tax cricket team in BCCI Corporate Trophy.
