= Ashish Hooda =

Indian cricketer (born 1989)

Personal information
- Full name: Ashish Harinder Hooda
- Born: 20 September 1989 (age 37); Rohtak, Haryana, India
- Batting: Right-handed
- Bowling: Right-arm medium

Domestic team information
- Years: Team
- 2010–present: Haryana
- Source: ESPNcricinfo, 4 October 2015

Ashish Hooda (born 20 September 1989) is an Indian first-class cricketer who plays for Haryana. He was the joint-leading wicket-taker for Haryana in the 2017–18 Ranji Trophy, with 19 dismissals in six matches.
