= Naved Ahmed (Indian cricketer) =

Indian cricketer (born 1986)

Personal information
- Full name: Naved Shakeel Ahmed
- Born: 1 July 1986 (age 40); Fatehpur, India
- Batting: Right-handed
- Bowling: Right-arm offbreak

Domestic team information
- Years: Team
- Bengal
- Source: ESPNcricinfo, 11 October 2017

Naved Ahmed (born 1 July 1986) is an Indian first-class cricketer who plays for Bengal.
