= Pranay Sharma =

Indian cricketer (born 1988)

Personal information
- Born: 16 March 1988 (age 38); Jaipur, Rajasthan, India
- Source: Cricinfo, 6 October 2015

Pranay Sharma (born 16 March 1988) is an Indian first-class cricketer who plays for Rajasthan.
