= Anurag Sarangi =

Indian cricketer (born 1992)

Personal information
- Full name: Anurag Rajendra Sarangi
- Born: 17 December 1992 (age 33); Bhubaneshwar, Odisha, India
- Batting: Left-handed
- Bowling: Right-arm off break

Domestic team information
- Years: Team
- 2014–present: Odisha

Career statistics
Competition	FC	LA	T20
Matches	9	7	10
Runs scored	543	331	239
Batting average	31.94	55.16	26.55
100s/50s	0/3	1/2	0/0
Top score	92	112	47*
Balls bowled	6	51	–
Wickets	0	0	–
Bowling average	–	–	–
5 wickets in innings	–	–	–
10 wickets in match	–	–	–
Best bowling	–	–	–
Catches/stumpings	6/–	4/–	1/–
- Source: ESPNcricinfo, 2 November 2015

Anurag Sarangi (born 17 December 1992) is an Indian cricketer who plays for Odisha. Sarangi made his first-class debut in 2014 against Maharashtra. He made his List A debut on 3 March 2014, for Maharashtra in the 2013–14 Vijay Hazare Trophy.
