= Sunaria =

Coordinates: 28°50′30″N 76°32′36″E

Sunaria is a village in Rohtak district, Haryana, India. An IIM institute is being constructed near the village.

A police training centre was established in 2010 for the training of the armed police force of the state. Budhwar gotr of the Jat caste are the main inhabitants of the village. Previously there was two small villages, Sunaria Kalan and Sunaria Khurd, which were combined into Sunaria. Sunaria is included in the municipal area of the city of Rohtak.

== Nearby villages ==
- Mayna
- Karotha
