= Pankaj Shaw =

Indian cricketer (born 1988)

Personal information
- Born: 12 February 1988 (age 38); Gopalpur, West Bengal, India
- Source: Cricinfo, 4 October 2015

Pankaj Shaw (born 12 February 1988) is an Indian cricketer who played for Bengal. He played in twelve first-class, seven List A and sixteen Twenty20 matches between 2014 and 2017. In December 2016, Shaw scored 413 not out in a Cricket Association of Bengal First Division match.
