= Rohit Sharma (Haryana cricketer) =

Indian cricketer (born 1993)

Personal information
- Full name: Rohit Parmod Sharma
- Born: 28 June 1993 (age 33); Jhajjar, Haryana, India
- Batting: Right-handed
- Bowling: Right arm medium
- Source: Cricinfo, 2 November 2015

Rohit Sharma (born 28 June 1993) is an Indian cricketer who plays for Haryana. He made his first-class debut on 30 October in the 2015–16 Ranji Trophy. He made his List A debut on 10 December 2015 in the 2015–16 Vijay Hazare Trophy. He made his Twenty20 debut on 2 January 2016 in the 2015–16 Syed Mushtaq Ali Trophy.
