= Pratik Das =

Indian cricketer (born 1994)

Personal information
- Full name: Pratik Pradipkumar Das
- Born: 10 February 1994 (age 32); Bhubaneswar, Odisha, India
- Batting: Right-handed
- Bowling: Right-arm off break

Domestic team information
- Years: Team
- 2014–present: Odisha
- Source: Cricinfo, 2 November 2015

Pratik Das (born 10 February 1994) is an Indian first-class cricketer who plays for Odisha. He made his first-class debut against Rajasthan in January 2015.
