= Kukna Ajay Singh =

Indian cricketer (born 1996)

Personal information
- Born: 13 December 1996 (age 29); Sri Ganganagar, Rajasthan, India
- Batting: Left-handed
- Bowling: Slow left arm orthodox
- Source: ESPNcricinfo, 11 October 2015

Kukna Ajay Singh (born 13 December 1996) is an Indian first-class cricketer who plays for Rajasthan. He made his Twenty20 debut on 2 January 2016 in the 2015–16 Syed Mushtaq Ali Trophy.
