= Swapnil Bandiwar =

Indian cricketer (born 1988)

Personal information
- Born: 9 August 1988 (age 38); Amravati, India
- Source: Cricinfo, 6 October 2015

Swapnil Bandiwar (born 9 August 1988) is an Indian first-class cricketer who plays for Vidarbha. He made his List A debut on 27 February 2014, for Vidarbha in the 2013–14 Vijay Hazare Trophy.
