= Shishir Bhavane =

Indian cricketer (born 1991)

Personal information
- Full name: Shishir Anil Bhavane
- Born: 24 September 1991 (age 35); Hubli, Karnataka, India
- Batting: Left-handed
- Bowling: Right-arm off break
- Role: Batsman

Domestic team information
- Years: Team
- 2014/15–2018/19: Karnataka

Career statistics
Competition	FC	List A
Matches	7	5
Runs scored	432	139
Batting average	43.20	34.75
100s/50s	1/3	0/1
Top score	119	81*
Balls bowled	24	-
Wickets	0	-
Bowling average	-	-
5 wickets in innings	-	-
10 wickets in match	-	n/a
Best bowling	-	-
Catches/stumpings	9/-	2/–
- Source: ESPNcricinfo, 5 March 2025

Shishir Anil Bhavane (born 24 September 1991) is an Indian former cricketer who played for Karnataka cricket team. He batted left-handed and bowled right-arm off break. He was bought by Royal Challengers Bangalore at the 2015 IPL auction for his base price of Rs.10 lakh.

== Career ==
Between 2005/06 and 2014/15, Bhavane played for various age-group teams of Karnataka including Under-15s, Under-17s, Under-19s, Under-22s, Under-23s and Under-25s.

Bhavane played for the Mysore Warriors in the 2014-15 Karnataka Premier League in which he scored 307 runs at an average of 76.50 and won the man of the tournament award. He was picked in the Karnataka squad for the 2014–15 Vijay Hazare Trophy in November 2014 when he made his senior cricket debut. In his second match of the tournament, he scored an unbeaten 81 off 76 balls to guide Karnataka's run-chase of 296 against Hyderabad. He made his first-class debut against Mumbai in February 2015 and scored 62 on a turning wicket in Mumbai. Later that month, the Indian Premier League franchise Royal Challengers Bangalore signed him up for his base price of Rs.10 lakh, making him the only Karnataka player in their squad for the 2015 season.

He made his Twenty20 debut for Karnataka in the 2016–17 Inter State Twenty-20 Tournament on 31 January 2017.
