= Krishna Das (cricketer) =

Indian cricketer (born 1990)

Personal information
- Full name: Krishna Subhash Das
- Born: 12 October 1990 (age 35); Barpeta, Assam, India
- Batting: Right-handed
- Bowling: Right-arm fast-medium
- Role: Bowler

Domestic team information
- Years: Team
- 2005/06–2017/18: Assam
- 2018/19: Goa
- 2019/20: Assam
- Source: CricketArchive, 9 August 2025

Krishna Subhash Das (born 12 October 1990) is an Indian cricketer who plays for Assam in domestic cricket. He is a right-arm fast-medium bowler. He also represented the India Under-19 cricket team that toured Australia in 2009.

Das made his first-class debut for Assam in the 2005–06 Ranji Trophy. He made his Twenty20 debut on 2 January 2016 in the 2015–16 Syed Mushtaq Ali Trophy. In March 2016, he was named in the Rest of India squad for the 2015–16 Irani Cup match against Mumbai. In August 2016, he was named in the India Blue squad for the 2016–17 Duleep Trophy.

Ahead of the 2018–19 Ranji Trophy, he transferred from Assam to Goa.
