= Swapnil Gugale =

Indian cricketer (born 1991)

Personal information
- Full name: Swapnil Mansukh Gugale
- Born: 4 April 1991 (age 35); Pune, Maharashtra, India
- Batting: Right-handed
- Bowling: Right arm off break
- Source: Cricinfo, 22 October 2015

Swapnil Gugale (born 4 April 1991) is an Indian first-class cricketer who plays for Maharashtra. In October 2016 during the 2016–17 Ranji Trophy, he scored 351 runs not out in a match between Maharashtra and Delhi. In the match he made a 594-run partnership with Ankit Bawne, the second-highest partnership in first-class cricket and the highest partnership in the history of the Ranji Trophy.

== See also ==
- List of Ranji Trophy triple centuries
