= Domnic Joseph =

Indian cricketer (born 1981)

Personal information
- Full name: Domnic Joseph Muthuswami
- Born: 9 March 1981 (age 45); Pune, Maharashtra, India
- Batting: Right-handed
- Bowling: Right-arm medium-fast
- Role: Bowler

Domestic team information
- Years: Team
- 2011–2019: Maharashtra
- 2015: Delhi Daredevils (squad no. 9)

Career statistics
Competition	FC	LA	T20
Matches	21	14	11
Runs scored	76	69	6
Batting average	4.75	13.80	3.00
100s/50s	0/0	0/0	0/0
Top score	17	26	4
Balls bowled	3,345	812	233
Wickets	50	27	11
Bowling average	26.74	26.37	26.63
5 wickets in innings	1	1	0
10 wickets in match	0	0	0
Best bowling	5/19	6/25	3/33
Catches/stumpings	11/–	3/–	3/–
- Source: ESPNcricinfo, 8 April 2015

Domnic Joseph Muthuswami (born 9 March 1981) is a former Indian cricketer of Tamil descent who played for Maharashtra cricket team in domestic cricket and Delhi Daredevils in the Indian Premier League.

Muthuswami was a right-arm medium-fast bowler, who made his debut for Maharashtra at the age of 30. He worked in a bullet manufacturing company in Pune, before his bowling abilities were recognised while playing in the Industrial League. In 2011, he impressed the then Maharashtra coach Surendra Bhave and was selected in the Maharashtra Ranji squad later that year. In 2015, he was bought by the IPL franchise Delhi Daredevils for Rs. 75 lakh at the players' auction. He made his IPL debut on 9 April 2015, playing for the Daredevils against the Chennai Super Kings.
