= Shrikant Mundhe =

Indian cricketer (born 1988)

Personal information
- Full name: Shrikant Shrihari Mundhe
- Born: 27 October 1988 (age 38); Nanded, Maharashtra, India
- Batting: Right-handed
- Bowling: Right-arm medium-fast
- Role: Bowler

Domestic team information
- Years: Team
- 2007–present: Maharashtra
- 2011: Pune Warriors

Career statistics
Competition	FC	LA	T20
Matches	55	46	29
Runs scored	1,598	723	181
Batting average	24.96	25.82	10.05
100s/50s	2/6	0/4	0/0
Top score	104	72	42
Balls bowled	9,570	2,050	541
Wickets	156	70	29
Bowling average	31.50	28.38	25.68
5 wickets in innings	4	2	0
10 wickets in match	0	0	0
Best bowling	6/38	5/18	3/22
Catches/stumpings	23/–	10/–	12/–
- Source: ESPNcricinfo, 28 March 2019

Shrikant Shrihari Mundhe (born 27 October 1988) is an Indian first-class cricketer who plays for Maharashtra in domestic cricket. He is a right-hand batsman and right-arm medium-pace bowler. He has represented Pune Warriors in the 2011 edition of Indian Premier League.

In December 2018, he was bought by the Kolkata Knight Riders in the player auction for the 2019 Indian Premier League. He was released by the Kolkata Knight Riders ahead of the 2020 IPL auction.
