= Gokul Sharma =

Indian cricketer (born 1985)

Personal information
- Born: 25 December 1985 (age 40); Guwahati, India
- Batting: Right-handed
- Bowling: Right-arm off break
- Role: Batsman

Domestic team information
- Years: Team
- 2004–present: Assam
- Source: ESPNcricinfo, 4 October 2015

Gokul Sharma (born 25 December 1985) is an Indian cricketer who plays first-class cricket and List A cricket for Assam. He has also played for East Zone in the Duleep Trophy. Sharma is a right-handed middle order batsman and right-arm off break bowler. He made his first-class debut against Tamil Nadu at Guwahati in 2004–05 Ranji Trophy.

He was the leading run-scorer for Assam in the 2017–18 Ranji Trophy, with 429 runs in six matches. He was also the leading run-scorer for Assam in the 2018–19 Ranji Trophy, with 570 runs in eight matches.
