= Nathu Singh (cricketer) =

Indian cricketer (born 1995)

Personal information
- Full name: Nathu Bharat Singh
- Born: 8 September 1995 (age 30); Jaipur, Rajasthan, India
- Batting: Right-handed
- Bowling: Right-arm fast
- Role: Bowler

Domestic team information
- Years: Team
- 2015/16–2018/19: Rajasthan
- 2017: Gujarat Lions
- Source: ESPNcricinfo, 6 October 2015

Nathu Singh (born 8 September 1995) is an Indian former cricketer who played for Rajasthan. He made his first-class debut in the 2015–16 Ranji Trophy on 1 October 2015. He made his List A debut in the 2015–16 Vijay Hazare Trophy on 10 December 2015. In February 2017, he was bought by the Gujarat Lions team for the 2017 Indian Premier League for 50 lakhs.

In December 2018, he was bought by the Delhi Capitals in the player auction for the 2019 Indian Premier League. He was released by the Delhi Capitals ahead of the 2020 IPL auction.
