= Ravikumar Samarth =

Indian cricketer

Personal information
- Born: 22 January 1993 (age 33); Mysore, Karnataka, India
- Batting: Right-handed
- Bowling: Right-arm off break
- Role: Batsman

Domestic team information
- Years: Team
- 2013/14–present: Karnataka

Career statistics
Competition	FC	LA	T20
Matches	66	39	23
Runs scored	4171	1781	275
Batting average	38.62	53.96	13.75
100s/50s	9/20	7/8	0/0
Top score	235	192	40
Balls bowled	624	–	–
Wickets	5	–	–
Bowling average	83.00	–	–
5 wickets in innings	0	–	–
10 wickets in match	0	–	–
Best bowling	2/67	–	–
Catches/stumpings	72/–	17/–	9/–
- Source: Cricinfo, 18 January 2020

Ravikumar Samarth (born 22 January 1993) is an Indian cricketer who plays for Vidarbha cricket team. He is a right-handed top-order batsman and occasional right-arm off break bowler. He played for Karnataka at various age-group levels such as Under-12, Under-14, Under-16 and Under-19, before making his first-class debut in December 2013.

== Early and personal life ==
Samarth did his schooling at the Bishop Cotton Boys' School and B'Com at SBM Jain College which comes under the umbrella of Jain University, Bangalore. While studying at Bishop Cottons, he trained at the Karnataka Institute of Cricket. He also led his school cricket team at the U-14 and U-16 levels, often opening both batting and bowling. He ended leading multiple winning inter-school cricket teams in India. While at school, he was renowned for intensity on the field and his clam demeanor off it. His father Ravikumar works as a clerk in State Bank of India. He has an elder sister Mowna who works at Yahoo. He recently got engaged to Uttara Prakash and posted it on Instagram on 1 January which was his 100th post on Instagram.

According to his father, he was a good sprinter and tennis player.

== Career ==
Samarth played division cricket in the KSCA league. In 2011, he scored over 1200 runs in the national Under-19 tournaments – Vinoo Mankad Trophy and Cooch Behar Trophy.

In 2013, he scored six hundreds from eight innings for KSCA President's XI in the Safi Darashah Trophy, including five hundreds in succession. He made his first-class debut for Karnataka against Mumbai in December 2013 and scored 18 and 75 in that match opening the innings.

In October 2018, he was named in India C's squad for the 2018–19 Deodhar Trophy. In February 2022, he was bought by the Sunrisers Hyderabad in the auction for the 2022 Indian Premier League tournament.
