= Manan Sharma =

Indian cricketer (born 1991)

Personal information
- Born: 19 March 1991 (age 35); Delhi, India
- Batting: Left-handed
- Bowling: Slow left-arm orthodox
- Role: All-rounder
- Relatives: Ajay Sharma (father)

Domestic team information
- Years: Team
- 2008–2019: Delhi

Career statistics
Competition	FC	LA	T20
Matches	10	8	11
Runs scored	287	67	72
Batting average	20.50	16.75	18.00
100s/50s	0/2	0/0	0/0
Top score	77*	43	20
Balls bowled	1,786	300	201
Wickets	35	7	12
Bowling average	27.62	32.57	14.25
5 wickets in innings	2	0	0
10 wickets in match	0	0	0
Best bowling	6/24	2/17	3/19
Catches/stumpings	3/–	1/–	2/–
- Source: ESPNcricinfo, 26 March 2015

Manan Sharma (born 19 March 1991) is a former Indian cricketer who played for Delhi cricket team in domestic cricket. He is an all-rounder who bats left-handed, and bowls slow left-arm orthodox. He played for India Under-19 cricket team at the 2010 ICC Under-19 Cricket World Cup. He is the son of former India international cricketer Ajay Sharma.

In October 2017, he scored his maiden century in first-class cricket, batting for Delhi against Railways in the 2017–18 Ranji Trophy.

On 20 August 2021, he announced his retirement from playing cricket in India.
