= Sheldon Jackson (cricketer) =

Indian cricketer

Personal information
- Full name: Sheldon Philip Jackson
- Born: 27 September 1986 (age 39); Bhavnagar, Gujarat, India
- Height: 6 ft 0 in (183 cm)
- Batting: Right-handed
- Bowling: Right arm off break
- Role: Wicket-keeper-batsman

Domestic team information
- Years: Team
- 2006–2019: Saurashtra
- 2017: Kolkata Knight Riders
- 2020–2021: Puducherry
- 2021–2025: Saurashtra
- 2022: Kolkata Knight Riders

Career statistics
Competition	FC	LA	T20
Matches	98	81	84
Runs scored	6,949	2,654	1,812
Batting average	46.95	36.35	27.45
100s/50s	21/37	9/13	1/11
Top score	186	150*	106*
Balls bowled	96	–	–
Wickets	2	–	–
Bowling average	29.50	–	–
5 wickets in innings	0	–	–
10 wickets in match	0	–	–
Best bowling	1/14	–	–
Catches/stumpings	72/2	42/9	56/8
- Source: ESPNcricinfo, 28 May 2024

Sheldon Philip Jackson (born 27 September 1986) is an Indian cricketer who plays for Saurashtra in domestic cricket and previously appeared for Kolkata Knight Riders in Indian Premier League (IPL). He is a right-handed wicket-keeper-batter.

== Career ==
After a good domestic season in 2012–13, he was signed up by the Royal Challengers Bangalore in February 2013. He finished the 2014–15 Ranji Trophy season as the fifth-highest run-getter. During the 2015–16 Vijay Hazare Trophy, Jackson hit two centuries on two consecutive days of the competition. Jackson made his debut for Saurashtra in 2011 and scored 5634 runs in first-class cricket at an average of 49.42, including 19 hundreds and 27 half-centuries. He was a part of Kolkata Knight Riders IPL team in 2017.

On 3 March 2017, during the 2016–17 Vijay Hazare Trophy match against Chhattisgarh, Jackson became only the second Indian batsman to be given out in a List A match by obstructing the field.

On 2 November 2018, in Saurashtra's match against Chhattisgarh in the 2018–19 Ranji Trophy, he scored his fifteenth century in first-class cricket. He was the leading run-scorer for Saurashtra in the group-stage of the 2018–19 Ranji Trophy, with 613 runs in eight matches.

In July 2020, Jackson moved from Saurashtra to Puducherry, ahead of the 2020–21 Ranji Trophy. In February 2021, Jackson was bought by the Kolkata Knight Riders in the IPL auction ahead of the 2021 Indian Premier League. In February 2022, he was bought by the Kolkata Knight Riders in the auction for the 2022 Indian Premier League tournament. In 2025 December Jackson is bought by Sudurpaschim Royals for NPL season 2.
