= Jagadeesha Suchith =

Indian cricketer

Personal information
- Born: 16 January 1994 (age 32); Mysore, Karnataka, India
- Batting: Left-handed
- Bowling: Slow left-arm orthodox
- Role: Bowling all-rounder

Domestic team information
- Years: Team
- 2013/14–2023/24: Karnataka
- 2015–2016: Mumbai Indians (squad no. 17)
- 2019: Delhi Capitals (squad no. 27)
- 2021–2022: Sunrisers Hyderabad
- 2024/25: Nagaland
- 2025/26: Uttarakhand

Career statistics
Competition	FC	LA	T20
Matches	32	50	93
Runs scored	938	707	418
Batting average	26.05	25.25	14.92
100s/50s	0/5	1/4	0/0
Top score	99	104	34*
Balls bowled	6,055	2,413	1,819
Wickets	120	60	81
Bowling average	23.42	30.68	28.20
5 wickets in innings	9	1	0
10 wickets in match	1	0	0
Best bowling	6/36	5/34	3/2
Catches/stumpings	27/–	26/–	43/–
- Source: ESPNcricinfo, 23 February 2026

Jagadeesha Suchith (born 16 January 1994) is an Indian cricketer who plays for Uttarakhand having previously represented Karnataka and Nagaland. A left-handed batsman and slow left-arm orthodox bowler, Suchith has also played in the Indian Premier League.

== Career ==
Suchith played for various age-group teams for Karnataka such as Under-15s, Under-16s, Under-19s, Under-22s, Under-23s and Under-25s, as well as the South Zone Under-19 team. He made his senior cricket debut for Karnataka in the final of the 2014–15 Vijay Hazare Trophy against Punjab at Ahmedabad.

Suchith was bought by the IPL franchise Mumbai Indians at the auction before the 2015 Indian Premier League. He made his IPL debut for Mumbai against Kings XI Punjab. In February 2021, Suchith was bought by the Sunrisers Hyderabad in the IPL auction ahead of the 2021 Indian Premier League. In February 2022, he was bought by the Sunrisers Hyderabad in the auction for the 2022 Indian Premier League tournament.
