= Sumit Narwal =

Indian cricketer (born 1982)

Personal information
- Full name: Sumit Narwal
- Born: Chirao, Karnal district, Haryana
- Batting: Left-handed
- Bowling: Right-arm medium

Domestic team information
- Years: Team
- 2001/02–2003/04: Haryana
- 2007/08–2016/17: Delhi
- 2010: Rajasthan Royals
- 2013: Kolkata Knight Riders

Career statistics
Competition	FC	LA	T20
Matches	57	47	33
Runs scored	1,827	534	277
Batting average	27.26	21.36	21.30
100s/50s	2/9	0/1	0/0
Top score	137	62	42
Balls bowled	10,431	2,210	643
Wickets	201	62	27
Bowling average	22.91	26.25	30.51
5 wickets in innings	6	1	0
10 wickets in match	0	0	0
Best bowling	7/43	5/21	3/15
Catches/stumpings	12/–	13/–	9/–
- Source: , 5 November 2022

Sumit Narwal (born 1982) is an Indian cricketer who plays for Delhi. An all-rounder from Haryana known for his right-arm medium-fast bowling and left-handed batting. He made his first-class debut for Delhi in the 2001–02 season. Narwal has played in the Indian Premier League (IPL) for teams like the Kolkata Knight Riders and Rajasthan Royals, debuting in the 2010 IPL season.
