= Robin Uthappa =

Indian former cricketer

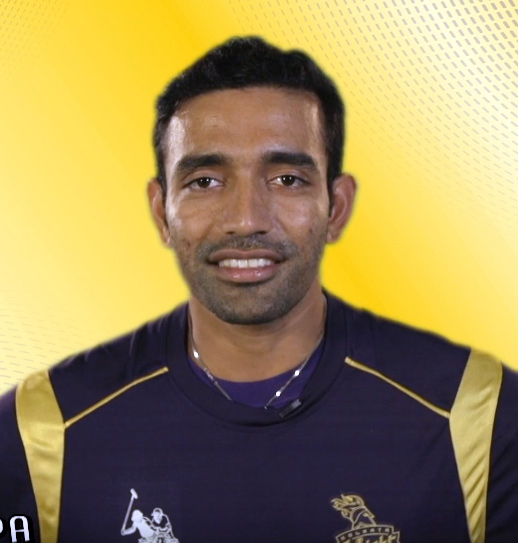
- Uthappa in 2014

Personal information
- Full name: Robin Uthappa Aiyuda
- Born: 11 November 1985 (age 41); Kodagu, Karnataka, India
- Batting: Right-handed
- Bowling: Right-arm medium
- Role: Batsman; Wicket-keeper

International information
- National side: India (2006–2015)
- ODI debut (cap 165): 15 April 2006 v England
- Last ODI: 14 July 2015 v Zimbabwe
- ODI shirt no.: 37
- T20I debut (cap 13): 13 September 2007 v Scotland
- Last T20I: 19 July 2015 v Zimbabwe
- T20I shirt no.: 37

Domestic team information
- Years: Team
- 2002/03–2016/17: Karnataka
- 2008: Mumbai Indians
- 2009–2010: Royal Challengers Bangalore
- 2011–2013: Pune Warriors India
- 2014–2019: Kolkata Knight Riders
- 2017/18–2018/19: Saurashtra
- 2019/20–2021/22: Kerala
- 2020: Rajasthan Royals
- 2021–2022: Chennai Super Kings
- 2023: Dubai Capitals
- 2023: Harare Hurricanes
- 2023: Bangla Tigers

Career statistics
Competition	ODI	T20I	FC	LA
Matches	46	13	142	203
Runs scored	934	249	9,446	6,534
Batting average	25.94	24.90	40.71	35.31
100s/50s	0/6	0/1	22/52	16/33
Top score	86	50	162	169
Balls bowled	2	–	754	284
Wickets	0	–	12	5
Bowling average	–	–	40.41	57.20
5 wickets in innings	–	–	0	0
10 wickets in match	–	–	0	0
Best bowling	–	–	3/26	2/19
Catches/stumpings	19/2	2/–	134/2	110/9
Medal record
Men's cricket
Representing India
ICC T20 World Cup
Winner	2007 South Africa
ACC Asia Cup
Runner-up	2008 Pakistan
ACC U19 Asia Cup
Winner	2003 Pakistan
- Source: ESPNcricinfo, 28 May 2022

Robin Uthappa Aiyuda (Note: See the business filings of entity that he is admittedly a director in.) (Kannada: [ut̪ʰːapːaː];; born 11 November 1985) is an Indian cricket coach, commentator, and former cricketer. He represented the Indian national team in One Day International and Twenty20 International cricket.

Uthappa made his One Day International debut in the seventh and final match of the English tour of India in April 2006. He had a successful debut, making 86 as an opening batsman before being dismissed run out. It was the highest score for an Indian debutant in a limited-overs match. He played an important role in India's win at the 2007 ICC World Twenty20. He finished the 2014–15 Ranji Trophy season as the highest run scorer that season and was also the highest run-scorer that year in the IPL. He announced his retirement from all forms of cricket on 14 September 2022.

== Early life ==
Uthappa was born in Kodagu in Karnataka, India. He received his education at Sri Bhagawan Mahaveer Jain College which comes under the umbrella of Jain University, Bangalore.

== Playing career ==
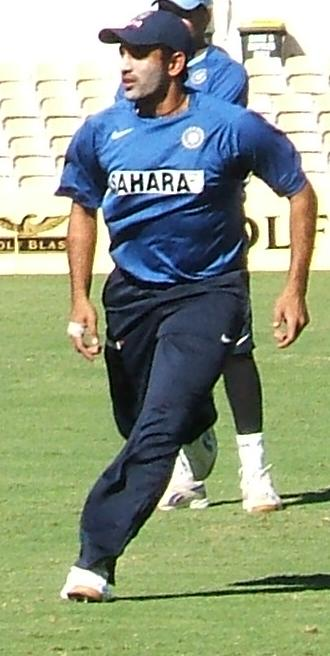
Uthappa during fielding practice session

Uthappa first came to the public's attention when he made 66 for India B against India A in the Challenger Trophy in 2005. The following year, in the same tournament, Uthappa made match-winning 93-ball 100 against the same team which propelled him in the big league. Previously, he had been a member of the India Under-19 team that won the Asia Cup. Once a wicket-keeper batsman, his List A batting average of near 40 with a strike rate of approximately 90 has made him regarded as something of a limited overs cricket specialist.

He was recalled to the ODI team in January 2007 for the series against the West Indies. He did not feature in the first two games. He scored a quick 70 in the third game followed by a quickfire 28 in the fourth game.

He was selected in the 15-member squad of the Indian team for the 2007 Cricket World Cup held in the West Indies in March–April 2007. He played in all three group games, but only scored 30 runs in total as India suffered a shock defeat to Bangladesh and a loss to Sri Lanka resulting in the team not qualifying for the Super 8 stage.

In the sixth ODI of the NatWest Series 2007–2008, he scored 47 off 33 balls to take India to a thrilling victory, keeping Indian hopes alive in the 7- match series which they were trailing 2–3 before the match. Used to batting as an opener, in this match he came in at the unfamiliar position of no 7. When he came at the crease India were 5 down for 234 after 40.2 overs, still needing 83 from less than 10 overs. After Dhoni got out in the 47th over with the Indian score at 294, Uthappa kept a cool head to take India to the target with two balls to spare in a remarkable victory.

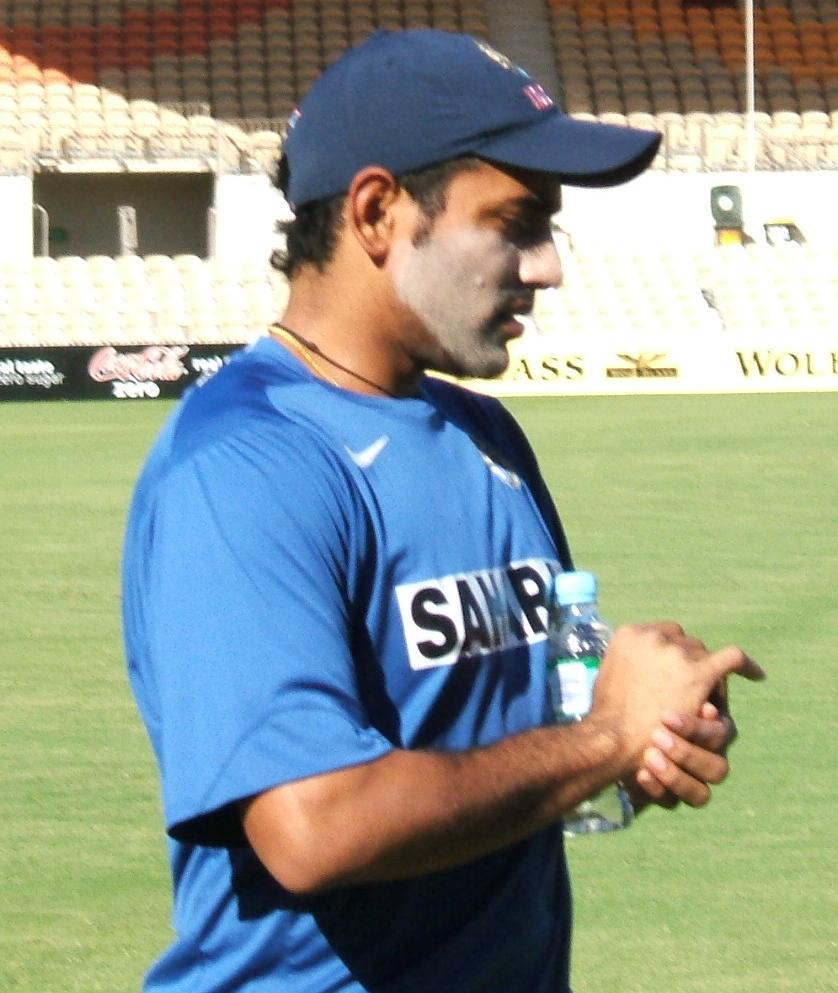

Uthappa also scored a crucial 50 against Pakistan in the 20–20 World Cup in South Africa in the year 2007, when India were tottering at 39/4. With this, he became the first Indian to score a 50 in a T20 International match. India subsequently won the match in bowl out 3–0, where he bowled one of the three deliveries that hit the stumps.

After his impressive performance in the seventh season of IPL, he was selected to captain the India A team for its tour of Australia in July 2013.

In November 2014, Uthappa was included into the Indian One Day International squad for the last two matches against Sri Lanka.

He was included in the 30 men Indian squad for 2015 Cricket World Cup. Robin Uthappa was also included in team India which toured Zimbabwe in 2015

In June 2019, Uthappa moved from Saurashtra, joining Kerala, ahead of the 2019–20 Ranji Trophy season.

== Indian Premier League ==
Uthappa played for the Mumbai Indians in the 2008 Indian Premier League and had a fairly successful opening season. In his first match he scored 48 runs from 38 balls against Royal Challengers Bangalore. In the next game, against Chennai Super Kings, he made 43 (36) including 6 fours and a six. Against Kolkata Knight Riders, he stitched an unbeaten 123-run partnership with Dwayne Bravo, where he scored a run-a-ball 37 to steer Mumbai to an easy win. Then he scored 34 off just 21 deliveries to lead Mumbai to an emphatic victory over the in-form Rajasthan Royals. However, a quickfire 23-ball 46 from Uthappa went in vain after Delhi Daredevils clinched a 5-wicket win in a nail-biting finish.

In January 2009, he was swapped with Zaheer Khan and moved to Royal Challengers Bangalore. He had a disappointing 2009 season of IPL for the Royal Challengers. His only noteworthy innings came against the Mumbai Indians in a match where he struck 66* off 42 balls to guide the RCB run-chase.

In a match against Kings XI Punjab in 2010 Indian Premier League he smashed a 21-ball 51, the second fastest fifty in Indian Premier League and was instrumental in setting up the win for the Royal Challengers. He came up with another match-winning innings, against Chennai Super Kings, as he struck an unbeaten 68 off just 38 balls. He also won the Man of the match award for this effort. Against Kolkata Knight Riders, he scored an unbeaten 50 from only 22 deliveries to take the Challengers to another comfortable win. He ended the season with 374 runs from 14 innings at an average of 31.16. He also hit 27 sixes, which was the most by any batsman in that season. For his performances in 2010, he was named in the ESPNcricinfo IPL XI.

For the 2011 Indian Premier League, he was bought by Pune Warriors for a huge sum of US$2.1 million (approximately INR 9.4 crores) in the auction held at Bangalore. He was the second most expensive player in that auction behind Gautam Gambhir, who was bought for US$2.4 million by Kolkata Knight Riders.

According to the Bangalore Mirror, a few days before the start of the Champions League T20, Uthappa converted to Roman Catholicism at the Holy Ghost Church in Bangalore. Bernard Moras, the Archbishop of Bangalore presided over and conducted the ceremony.

Even though IPL 5 was a disappointing one for Pune Warriors India, Uthappa remained their top scorer, scoring 405 runs from 16 games, which included a blistering 69 against the RCB. The same happened in Season 6 of IPL: although the team's performance was poor, Uthappa managed to score 434 runs in 16 matches.

For the seventh season of IPL, he was drafted in by Kolkata Knight Riders. He failed to perform well in the first leg of the tournament conducted in UAE. He was then promoted to the opening position with Gautam Gambhir and performed well in the India-leg of the season. He won the Orange Cap, given for scoring most runs in the season, 660, and in the process created a T20 record for having scored 40+ scores in 8 consecutive games. He eventually made 11, breaking the record held by Mathew Hayden of most 40+ scores in a single season. He was part of the Knight Riders squad until being released ahead of the 2020 IPL auction.

For the 2020 season of IPL, Uthappa was bought by Rajasthan Royals for ₹3 crore (US$320,000). He played 12 matches in the season, scoring 196 runs at an average of 16.33 and a highest-score of 41.

In January 2021, he was traded to Chennai Super Kings ahead of the 2021 Indian Premier League. He scored 63 runs from 44 balls in the Qualifier 1 against Delhi Capitals which helped Super kings to march towards the 9th IPL finals.

In the 2022 IPL Auction, Uthappa was bought by the Chennai Super Kings for his base price of ₹ 2 crores until being released ahead of the 2023 Indian Premier League.

=== Other leagues ===
In October 2023, Uthappa was signed by the Manipal Tigers for the 2nd season of the Legends League Cricket.

== Coaching career ==
In October 2026, Mumbai Indians announced Uthappa had been appointed as the team's batting coach.

== Personal life ==
Uthappa is half Kodava by ethnicity. His mother Roselyn is a Malayali. His father, Venu Uthappa, a former hockey umpire is a Kodava Hindu. Later he converted to Christianity, which he practices. He married his long-time girlfriend Sheethal Goutham in March 2016.
