= 2017–18 Zonal T20 League =

Cricket tournament

- Dates: 7 January 2018 – 16 January 2018
- Administrator: BCCI
- Cricket format: Twenty20 cricket
- Tournament format(s): Round robin in 5 groups Two winners per group
- Host: Various
- Participants: 28
- Official website: bcci.tv

2017–18 Zonal T20 League was a Twenty20 cricket competition in India. It was played from 7 to 16 January 2018. It was the second edition of the tournament, following the 2016–17 Inter State Twenty-20 Tournament held in January and February 2017.

Top 2 teams from each Zone qualified for the Super League stage of 2017–18 Syed Mushtaq Ali Trophy.

On 14 January, in the North Zone fixture between Himachal Pradesh and Delhi, Rishabh Pant scored the second-fastest century in a Twenty20 match, making 100 from 32 balls.

== Points Table ==
=== West Zone ===
Team	Pld	W	L	T	NR	Pts	NRR
Baroda	4	4	0	0	0	16	1.218
Mumbai	4	2	2	0	0	8	0.803
Saurashtra	4	2	2	0	0	8	-0.222
Gujarat	4	1	3	0	0	4	-0.405
Maharashtra	4	1	3	0	0	4	-1.270

=== Central Zone ===
Team	Pld	W	L	T	NR	Pts	NRR
Rajasthan	5	4	1	0	0	16	0.716
Uttar Pradesh	5	3	2	0	0	12	0.585
Vidarbha	5	3	2	0	0	12	0.505
Madhya Pradesh	5	3	2	0	0	12	0.112
Railways	5	1	4	0	0	4	-0.790
Chhattisgarh	5	1	4	0	0	4	-1.237

=== South Zone ===
Team	Pld	W	L	T	NR	Pts	NRR
Karnataka	5	4	1	0	0	16	1.354
Tamil Nadu	5	4	1	0	0	16	0.435
Andhra	5	4	1	0	0	16	0.109
Hyderabad	5	2	3	0	0	8	-0.074
Kerala	5	1	4	0	0	4	-0.375
Goa	5	0	5	0	0	0	-1.499

=== East Zone ===
Team	Pld	W	L	T	NR	Pts	NRR
Bengal	4	4	0	0	0	16	0.863
Jharkhand	4	3	1	0	0	12	1.080
Orissa	4	2	2	0	0	8	1.085
Tripura	4	1	3	0	0	4	-1.326
Assam	4	0	4	0	0	0	-1.484

=== North Zone ===
Team	Pld	W	L	T	NR	Pts	NRR
Delhi	5	4	1	0	0	16	2.267
Punjab	5	3	2	0	0	12	-0.140
Services	5	2	3	0	0	8	0.121
Haryana	5	2	3	0	0	8	-0.200
Himachal Pradesh	5	2	3	0	0	8	-0.804
Jammu and Kashmir	5	2	3	0	0	8	-0.838

== Fixtures ==
=== West Zone ===
7 January 2018
Scorecard

Baroda; 210/3 (20 overs)	v	Mumbai; 197/8 (20 overs)
Deepak Hooda 66 (39); Tushar Deshpande 2/38 (4 overs)		Siddhesh Lad 82 (51); Lukman Meriwala 3/29 (3 overs)

Baroda won by 13 runs
Saurashtra Cricket Association Stadium, Rajkot
Umpires: Navdeep Singh and Nitin Pandit

- Baroda won the toss and elected to bat.
- Urvil Patel (Baroda) and Parikshit Valsangkar (Mumbai) both made their T20 debuts.

7 January 2018
Scorecard

Gujarat; 151/8 (20 overs)	v	Maharashtra; 153/6 (19.3 overs)
Chirag Gandhi 61* (37); Domnic Muthuswami 4/27 (4 overs)		Nikhil Naik 70* (37); Piyush Chawla 3/27 (4 overs)

Maharashtra won by 4 wickets
Saurashtra Cricket Association Stadium, Rajkot
Umpires: K. N. Ananthapadmanabhan and R. Sundar

- Maharashtra won the toss and elected to field.
- Kshitij Patel (Gujarat) made his T20 debut.

8 January 2018
Scorecard

Saurashtra; 142/9 (20 overs)	v	Maharashtra; 138/7 (20 overs)
Prerak Mankad 34 (26); Domnic Muthuswami 2/27 (4 overs); Shrikant Mundhe 2/27 (4 overs); Jagdish Zope 2/27 (4 overs)		Ruturaj Gaikwad 41 (27); Yuvraj Chudasama 2/26 (4 overs)

Saurashtra won by 4 runs
Saurashtra Cricket Association Stadium, Rajkot
Umpires: Navdeep Singh and Nitin Pandit

- Saurashtra won the toss and elected to bat.
- Vishvaraj Jadeja, Yuvraj Chudasama and Kushang Patel (Saurashtra) all made their T20 debuts.

8 January 2018
Scorecard

Gujarat; 167/7 (20 overs)	v	Mumbai; 168/5 (19.2 overs)
Dhruv Raval 73 (34); Dhawal Kulkarni 3/32 (4 overs)		Jay Bista 50 (35); Piyush Chawla 2/29 (4 overs)

Mumbai won by 5 wickets
Saurashtra Cricket Association Stadium, Rajkot
Umpires: K. N. Ananthapadmanabhan and R. Sundar

- Mumbai won the toss and elected to field.
- Jayveer Parmar (Gujarat) made his T20 debut.

10 January 2018
Scorecard

Baroda; 175/7 (20 overs)	v	Gujarat; 139 (18 overs)
Kedar Devdhar 100 (61); Piyush Chawla 3/45 (4 overs)		Chirag Gandhi 52 (41); Rishi Arothe 3/26 (3 overs)

Baroda won by 36 runs
Saurashtra Cricket Association Stadium, Rajkot
Umpires: K. N. Ananthapadmanabhan and Navdeep Singh

- Baroda won the toss and elected to bat.
- Kedar Devdhar (Baroda) scored his first century in a T20 match.

10 January 2018
Scorecard

Mumbai; 130 (19.3 overs)	v	Saurashtra; 133/2 (17.2 overs)
Aditya Tare 39 (23); Shaurya Sanandia 4/22 (4 overs)		Robin Uthappa 52 (36); Shardul Thakur 2/23 (3.2 overs)

Saurashtra won by 8 wickets
Saurashtra Cricket Association Stadium, Rajkot
Umpires: Nitin Pandit and R. Sundar

- Mumbai won the toss and elected to bat.
- Khizer Dafedar (Mumbai) made his T20 debut.

11 January 2018
Scorecard

Maharashtra; 89 (15 overs)	v	Mumbai; 92/3 (9.2 overs)
Rahul Tripathi 21 (16); Vijay Zol 21 (16); Akash Parkar 3/22 (4 overs)		Aditya Tare 42* (26); Jagdish Zope 1/14 (1.2 overs)

Mumbai won by 7 wickets
Saurashtra Cricket Association Stadium, Rajkot
Umpires: Navdeep Singh and R. Sundar

- Mumbai won the toss and elected to field.
- Shams Mulani (Mumbai) made his T20 debut.

11 January 2018
Scorecard

Saurashtra; 131 (19.5 overs)	v	Baroda; 132/2 (16.3 overs)
Jaydev Unadkat 33 (26); Atit Sheth 2/18 (3.5 overs)		Kedar Devdhar 62* (48); Chirag Jani 1/17 (2.3 overs)

Baroda won by 8 wickets
Saurashtra Cricket Association Stadium, Rajkot
Umpires: K. N. Ananthapadmanabhan and Nitin Pandit

- Saurashtra won the toss and elected to bat.

13 January 2018
Scorecard

Saurashtra; 133 (19.2 overs)	v	Gujarat; 137/2 (18.1 overs)
Vishvaraj Jadeja 48 (32); Jayveer Parmar 4/17 (3.2 overs)		Priyank Kirit Panchal 76 (54); Shaurya Sanandia 2/25 (4 overs)

Gujarat won by 8 wickets
Saurashtra Cricket Association Stadium, Rajkot
Umpires: K. N. Ananthapadmanabhan and Nitin Pandit

- Gujarat won the toss and elected to field.

13 January 2018
Scorecard

Maharashtra; 178/6 (20 overs)	v	Baroda; 180/5 (18.3 overs)
Ruturaj Gaikwad 52 (36); Atit Sheth 3/21 (4 overs)		Deepak Hooda 57 (34); Domnic Muthuswami 3/24 (3 overs)

Baroda won by 5 wickets
Saurashtra Cricket Association Stadium, Rajkot
Umpires: Navdeep Singh and R. Sundar

- Maharashtra won the toss and elected to bat.

=== Central Zone ===
8 January 2018
Scorecard

Rajasthan; 156/5 (20 overs)	v	Madhya Pradesh; 120 (19.4 overs)
Ankit Lamba 62 (53); Ankit Sharma 1/17 (3 overs)		Rajat Patidar 38 (26); Chandrapal Singh 3/22 (4 overs)

Rajasthan won by 36 runs
Shaheed Veer Narayan Singh International Stadium, Raipur
Umpires: Saiyed Khalid and Vineet Kulkarni

- Madhya Pradesh won the toss and elected to field.
- Ankit Dane, Rajat Patidar (Madhya Pradesh), Abhijeet Tomar and Chetan Bist (Rajasthan) all made their T20 debuts.

8 January 2018
Scorecard

Vidarbha; 195/7 (20 overs)	v	Chhattisgarh; 147/8 (20 overs)
Jitesh Sharma 91 (53); Vishal Kushwah 2/31 (3 overs)		Shakeeb Ahmed 45* (23); Akshay Wakhare 2/22 (4 overs)

Vidarbha won by 48 runs
Shaheed Veer Narayan Singh International Stadium, Raipur
Umpires: Yeshwant Barde and Sadashiv Iyer

- Vidarbha won the toss and elected to bat.
- Shivendra Singh (Chhattisgarh) made his T20 debut.

9 January 2018
Scorecard

Uttar Pradesh; 146/5 (20 overs)	v	Rajasthan; 150/6 (19.5 overs)
Eklavya Dwivedi 27 (30); Tajinder Singh 2/16 (3 overs)		Ankit Lamba 45 (35); Amit Mishra 3/33 (2.5 overs)

Rajasthan won by 4 wickets
Shaheed Veer Narayan Singh International Stadium, Raipur
Umpires: Saiyed Khalid and Vineet Kulkarni

- Rajasthan won the toss and elected to field.

9 January 2018
Scorecard

Vidarbha; 163/7 (20 overs)	v	Railways; 146/9 (20 overs)
Faiz Fazal 45 (28); Amit Mishra 2/29 (4 overs)		Karan Sharma 35 (23); Ravikumar Thakur 3/26 (4 overs)

Vidarbha won by 17 runs
Shaheed Veer Narayan Singh International Stadium, Raipur
Umpires: Yeshwant Barde and Sadashiv Iyer

- Vidarbha won the toss and elected to field.
- Karan Sharma, Abhishek Sharma and Satender Thakran (Railways) all made their T20 debuts.

10 January 2018
Scorecard

Uttar Pradesh; 108/7 (20 overs)	v	Madhya Pradesh; 110/3 (17 overs)
Sarfaraz Khan 20 (19); Ankit Sharma 2/22 (4 overs)		Rajat Patidar 51* (41); Praveen Kumar 1/6 (2 overs)

Madhya Pradesh won by 7 wickets
Shaheed Veer Narayan Singh International Stadium, Raipur
Umpires: Yeshwant Barde and Vineet Kulkarni

- Madhya Pradesh won the toss and elected to field.
- Mohsin Khan (Uttar Pradesh) made his T20 debut.

10 January 2018
Scorecard

Chhattisgarh; 175/5 (20 overs)	v	Railways; 150/8 (20 overs)
Amandeep Khare 90 (57); Amit Mishra 2/30 (4 overs)		Mahesh Rawat 61* (47); Shakeeb Ahmed 3/27 (4 overs)

Chhattisgarh won by 25 runs
Shaheed Veer Narayan Singh International Stadium, Raipur
Umpires: Saiyed Khalid and Sadashiv Iyer

- Chhattisgarh won the toss and elected to bat.
- Rishabh Tiwari, Rohit Dhruw (Chhattisgarh) and Hitesh Kadam (Railways) all made their T20 debuts.

12 January 2018
Scorecard

Vidarbha; 156/5 (20 overs)	v	Madhya Pradesh; 149/9 (20 overs)
Apoorv Wankhade 43 (23); Ishwar Pandey 1/10 (3 overs)		Sohraab Dhaliwal 45 (25); Ravikumar Thakur 4/29 (4 overs)

Vidarbha won by 7 runs
Shaheed Veer Narayan Singh International Stadium, Raipur
Umpires: Vineet Kulkarni and Sadashiv Iyer

- Madhya Pradesh won the toss and elected to field.
- Anshul Tripathi and Ashutosh Sharma (Madhya Pradesh) both made their T20 debuts.

12 January 2018
Scorecard

Chhattisgarh; 103 (17.4 overs)	v	Rajasthan; 104/3 (17.3 overs)
Amandeep Khare 36 (40); Khaleel Ahmed 4/12 (3 overs)		Ankit Lamba 54* (55); Sumit Ruikar 2/28 (4 overs)

Rajasthan won by 7 wickets
Shaheed Veer Narayan Singh International Stadium, Raipur
Umpires: Yeshwant Barde and Saiyed Khalid

- Chhattisgarh won the toss and elected to bat.

13 January 2018
Scorecard

Railways; 132/8 (20 overs)	v	Uttar Pradesh; 134/3 (18 overs)
Mahesh Rawat 35 (35); Ankit Rajpoot 3/30 (4 overs)		Shivam Chaudhary 40 (39); Abhishek Sharma 2/25 (4 overs)

Uttar Pradesh won by 7 wickets
Shaheed Veer Narayan Singh International Stadium, Raipur
Umpires: Yeshwant Barde and Saiyed Khalid

- Uttar Pradesh won the toss and elected to field.

13 January 2018
Scorecard

Vidarbha; 131/8 (20 overs)	v	Rajasthan; 132/4 (18 overs)
Ganesh Satish 39 (31); Khaleel Ahmed 2/19 (4 overs)		Aditya Garhwal 51* (54); Akshay Wakhare 1/20 (4 overs)

Rajasthan won by 6 wickets
Shaheed Veer Narayan Singh International Stadium, Raipur
Umpires: Vineet Kulkarni and Sadashiv Iyer

- Vidarbha won the toss and elected to bat.

14 January 2018
Scorecard

Chhattisgarh; 150/7 (20 overs)	v	Madhya Pradesh; 154/5 (19.3 overs)
Amandeep Khare 47 (45); Avesh Khan 3/29 (4 overs)		Naman Ojha 58 (41); Shivendra Singh 2/22 (4 overs)

Madhya Pradesh won by 5 wickets
Shaheed Veer Narayan Singh International Stadium, Raipur
Umpires: Yeshwant Barde and Saiyed Khalid

- Madhya Pradesh won the toss and elected to field.

15 January 2018
Scorecard

Madhya Pradesh; 135/7 (20 overs)	v	Railways; 111/6 (20 overs)
Harpreet Singh 50 (47); Amit Mishra 3/17 (4 overs)		Mahesh Rawat 38 (31); Avesh Khan 2/16 (4 overs)

Madhya Pradesh won by 24 runs
Shaheed Veer Narayan Singh International Stadium, Raipur
Umpires: Saiyed Khalid and Vineet Kulkarni

- Railways won the toss and elected to field.

15 January 2018
Scorecard

Uttar Pradesh; 137/8 (20 overs)	v	Vidarbha; 131/8 (20 overs)
Shivam Chaudhary 51 (49); Shrikant Wagh 3/28 (4 overs)		Apoorv Wankhade 33 (32); Amit Mishra 4/10 (3 overs)

Uttar Pradesh won by 6 runs
Shaheed Veer Narayan Singh International Stadium, Raipur
Umpires: Yeshwant Barde and Sadashiv Iyer

- Uttar Pradesh won the toss and elected to bat.

16 January 2018
Scorecard

Rajasthan; 150/6 (20 overs)	v	Railways; 151/6 (19.3 overs)
Tajinder Singh 43* (25); Amit Mishra 2/34 (4 overs)		Chanderpal Saini 41 (43); Aniket Choudhary 2/31 (3.3 overs)

Railways won by 4 wickets
Shaheed Veer Narayan Singh International Stadium, Raipur
Umpires: Yeshwant Barde and Sadashiv Iyer

- Rajasthan won the toss and elected to bat.

16 January 2018
Scorecard

Chhattisgarh; 113/8 (20 overs)	v	Uttar Pradesh; 114/4 (11.2 overs)
Amandeep Khare 33 (33); Saurabh Kumar 2/16 (4 overs)		Akshdeep Nath 43* (29); Shakeeb Ahmed 2/29 (3 overs)

Uttar Pradesh won by 6 wickets
Shaheed Veer Narayan Singh International Stadium, Raipur
Umpires: Saiyed Khalid and Vineet Kulkarni

- Chhattisgarh won the toss and elected to bat.
- Nitish Rao (Chhattisgarh) made his T20 debut.

=== South Zone ===
8 January 2018
Scorecard

Karnataka; 172/4 (20 overs)	v	Goa; 123/8 (20 overs)
Mayank Agarwal 55 (35); Darshan Misal 3/27 (4 overs)		Sagun Kamat 28 (36); Abhimanyu Mithun 2/13 (4 overs)

Karnataka won by 49 runs
Dr. Y.S. Rajasekhara Reddy ACA-VDCA Cricket Stadium, Visakhapatnam
Umpires: Anil Dandekar and Virender Sharma

- Goa won the toss and elected to field.
- Achit Shigwan, Vijesh Prabhudessai (Goa) and Praveen Dubey (Karnataka) all made their T20 debuts.

8 January 2018
Scorecard

Hyderabad; 168/5 (20 overs)	v	Kerala; 158/7 (20 overs)
Ambati Rayudu 52* (31); Jalaj Saxena 2/28 (4 overs)		Sachin Baby 79 (50); Ravi Kiran 3/28 (4 overs)

Hyderabad won by 10 runs
Dr PVG Raju ACA Sports Complex, Vizianagaram
Umpires: Pashchim Pathak and Tapan Sharma

- Kerala won the toss and elected to field.
- Salman Nizar (Kerala) made his T20 debut.

8 January 2018
Scorecard

Andhra; 119/7 (20 overs)	v	Tamil Nadu; 122/3 (14.4 overs)
Ricky Bhui 25 (22); Krishnamoorthy Vignesh 2/17 (4 overs)		Dinesh Karthik 57 (28); Hanuma Vihari 1/17 (2 overs)

Tamil Nadu won by 7 wickets
Dr. Y. S. Rajasekhara Reddy ACA-VDCA Cricket Stadium, Visakhapatnam
Umpires: Abhijit Deshmukh and Ulhas Gandhe

- Andhra won the toss and elected to bat.
- Ravisrinivasan Sai Kishore (Tamil Nadu) made his T20 debut.

9 January 2018
Scorecard

Tamil Nadu; 184/4 (20 overs)	v	Kerala; 149/7 (20 overs)
Dinesh Karthik 71 (34); Sandeep Warrier 2/23 (4 overs)		Sachin Baby 51 (44); Krishnamoorthy Vignesh 5/25 (4 overs)

Tamil Nadu won by 35 runs
Dr. Y. S. Rajasekhara Reddy ACA-VDCA Cricket Stadium, Visakhapatnam
Umpires: Abhijit Deshmukh and Virender Sharma

- Kerala won the toss and elected to field.

9 January 2018
Scorecard

Goa; 181/5 (20 overs)	v	Hyderabad; 162/9 (20 overs)
Akshath Reddy 64 (40); Felix Alemao 2/35 (4 overs)		Sagun Kamat 47 (40); Ravi Kiran 4/23 (4 overs)

Hyderabad won by 19 runs
Dr. Y.S. Rajasekhara Reddy ACA-VDCA Cricket Stadium, Visakhapatnam
Umpires: Anil Dandekar and Ulhas Gandhe

- Hyderabad won the toss and elected to field.

9 January 2018
Scorecard

Karnataka; 156/8 (20 overs)	v	Andhra; 157/3 (20 overs)
Stuart Binny 47* (32); K. V. Sasikanth 3/32 (3.3 overs)		Ricky Bhui 46* (34); Stuart Binny 1/14 (2 overs)

Andhra won by 7 wickets
Dr PVG Raju ACA Sports Complex, Vizianagaram
Umpires: Pashchim Pathak and Tapan Sharma

- Andhra won the toss and elected to field.

11 January 2018
Scorecard

Karnataka; 205/5 (20 overs)	v	Hyderabad; 203/9 (20 overs)
Karun Nair 77 (42); Ravi Kiran 2/33 (4 overs)		Akshath Reddy 70 (29); Stuart Binny 3/29 (4 overs)

Karnataka won by 2 runs
Dr. Y.S. Rajasekhara Reddy ACA-VDCA Cricket Stadium, Visakhapatnam
Umpires: Abhijit Deshmukh and Ulhas Gandhe

- Hyderabad won the toss and elected to field.

11 January 2018
Scorecard

Kerala; 120 (12 overs)	v	Andhra; 126/4 (13 overs)
Vinod Kumar 45 (20); Harishankar Reddy 4/12 (2 overs)		Ashwin Hebbar 64 (34); Basil Thampi 2/35 (3 overs)

Andhra won by 6 wickets
Dr. Y.S. Rajasekhara Reddy ACA-VDCA Cricket Stadium, Visakhapatnam
Umpires: Kamlesh Sharma (Ind) and Virender Sharma (Ind)

- Andhra won the toss and elected to field.
- The match was reduced to 13 overs per side.
- Harishankar Reddy (Andhra) and Abhishek Mohan (Kerala) both made their T20 debuts.

11 January 2018
Scorecard

Tamil Nadu; 155/5 (20 overs)	v	Goa; 130/7 (20 overs)
Dinesh Karthik 56 (43); Amogh Sunil Desai 3/22 (3 overs)		Sagun Kamat 41 (42); Washington Sundar 2/20 (4 overs)

Tamil Nadu won by 25 runs
Dr PVG Raju ACA Sports Complex, Vizianagaram
Umpires: Pashchim Pathak and Tapan Sharma

- Tamil Nadu won the toss and elected to bat.

12 January 2018
Scorecard

Goa; 138/8 (20 overs)	v	Kerala; 139/1 (15.5 overs)
Keenan Vaz 36 (34); KM Asif 3/25 (4 overs)		Sanju Samson 64* (44); Lakshay Garg 1/38 (4 overs)

Kerala won by 9 wickets
Dr. Y.S. Rajasekhara Reddy ACA-VDCA Cricket Stadium, Visakhapatnam
Umpires: Ulhas Gandhe and Virender Sharma

- Kerala won the toss and elected to field.
- KM Asif (Kerala) made his T20 debut.

12 January 2018
Scorecard

Hyderabad; 129/9 (20 overs)	v	Andhra; 133/4 (18.2 overs)
Bavanaka Sandeep 39 (35); Harishankar Reddy 3/30 (4 overs)		Ricky Bhui 73* (53); Mohammed Siraj 3/26 (4 overs)

Andhra won by 6 wickets
Dr PVG Raju ACA Sports Complex, Vizianagaram
Umpires: Anil Dandekar and Kamlesh Sharma

- Hyderabad won the toss and elected to bat.

12 January 2018
Scorecard

Karnataka; 179/9 (20 overs)	v	Tamil Nadu; 101 (16.3 overs)
Karun Nair 111 (52); V Athisayaraj Davidson 5/30 (3 overs)		Washington Sundar 34 (26); Praveen Dubey 4/19 (3.3 overs)

Karnataka won by 78 runs
Dr. Y.S. Rajasekhara Reddy ACA-VDCA Cricket Stadium, Visakhapatnam
Umpires: Pashchim Pathak and Tapan Sharma

- Tamil Nadu won the toss and elected to field.
- Karun Nair (Karnataka) scored his first century in a T20 match.

14 January 2018
Scorecard

Tamil Nadu; 193/7 (20 overs)	v	Hyderabad; 177/8 (20 overs)
Sanjay Yadav 42 (28); Mehdi Hasan 3/40 (4 overs)		Tanmay Agarwal 59 (35); Washington Sundar 3/29 (4 overs)

Tamil Nadu won by 16 runs
Dr. Y.S. Rajasekhara Reddy ACA-VDCA Cricket Stadium, Visakhapatnam
Umpires: Kamlesh Sharma and Virender Sharma

- Hyderabad won the toss and elected to field.

14 January 2018
Scorecard

Karnataka; 181/6 (20 overs)	v	Kerala; 161 (19.2 overs)
Mayank Agarwal 86 (58); KM Asif 2/34 (4 overs)		Sanju Samson 71 (41); Praveen Dubey 3/35 (4 overs)

Karnataka won by 20 runs
Dr PVG Raju ACA Sports Complex, Vizianagaram
Umpires: Pashchim Pathak and Tapan Sharma

- Karnataka won the toss and elected to bat.

14 January 2018
Scorecard

Andhra; 201/4 (20 overs)	v	Goa; 183/6 (20 overs)
Ricky Bhui 65 (34); Darshan Misal 1/37 (4 overs)		Swapnil Asnodkar 72 (50); Bhargav Bhatt 2/30 (4 overs)

Andhra won by 18 runs
Dr. Y.S. Rajasekhara Reddy ACA-VDCA Cricket Stadium, Visakhapatnam
Umpires: Anil Dandekar and Abhijit Deshmukh

- Goa won the toss and elected to field.

=== East Zone ===
8 January 2018
Scorecard

Tripura; 162/5 (20 overs)	v	Assam; 154/8 (20 overs)
Yashpal Singh 56 (45); Abu Nechim 3/20 (4 overs)		Amit Sinha 64* (53); Ajoy Sarkar 3/31 (4 overs)

Tripura won by 8 runs
JSCA International Stadium Complex, Ranchi
Umpires: Rohan Pandit and Chirra Ravikanthreddy

- Assam won the toss and elected to field.
- Rajjakuddin Ahmed, Nipan Deka, Sekhar Barman (Assam) and Abhijit Chakraborty (Tripura) all made their T20 debuts.

8 January 2018
Scorecard

Odisha; 157/5 (20 overs)	v	Bengal; 158/3 (18.4 overs)
Rajesh Dhuper 90 (64); Manoj Tiwary 2/23 (3 overs)		Shreevats Goswami 79 (52); Jayanta Behera 1/18 (2 overs)

Bengal won by 7 wickets
JSCA International Stadium Complex, Ranchi
Umpires: Jayaraman Madanagopal and Krishnaraj Srinath

- Odisha won the toss and elected to bat.
- Rajesh Dhuper, Debasish Samantray, Prayash Singh and Debabrata Pradhan (Odisha) all made their T20 debuts.

10 January 2018
Scorecard

Jharkhand; 163/6 (20 overs)	v	Tripura; 139/9 (20 overs)
Virat Singh 43 (31); Gurinder Singh 3/21 (4 overs)		Smit Patel 49 (37); Shahbaz Nadeem 2/18 (4 overs)

Jharkhand won by 24 runs
JSCA International Stadium Complex, Ranchi
Umpires: Jayaraman Madanagopal and Krishnaraj Srinath

- Tripura won the tiss and elected to field.

10 January 2018
Scorecard

Odisha; 128/9 (20 overs)	v	Assam; 77 (17.2 overs)
Debasish Samantray 25 (25); Abu Nechim 2/13 (3 overs)		Rishav Das 26 (19); Prayash Singh 3/6 (3 overs)

Odisha won by 51 runs
JSCA International Stadium Complex, Ranchi
Umpires: Rohan Pandit and Chirra Ravikanthreddy

- Assam won the toss and elected to field.

12 January 2018
Scorecard

Odisha; 179/6 (20 overs)	v	Tripura; 107 (17.2 overs)
Rajesh Dhuper 42 (34); Sanjay Majumder 2/24 (3 overs)		Gurinder Singh 39 (36); Suryakant Pradhan 4/24 (3.2 overs)

Odisha won by 72 runs
JSCA International Stadium Complex, Ranchi
Umpires: Jayaraman Madanagopal and Chirra Ravikanthreddy

- Odisha won the toss and elected to bat.

12 January 2018
Scorecard

Jharkhand; 177/9 (20 overs)	v	Bengal; 179/4 (19.2 overs)
Ishank Jaggi 72 (39); Manoj Tiwary 2/27 (4 overs)		Vivek Singh 63 (40); Kaushal Singh 2/28 (3 overs)

Bengal won by 6 wickets
JSCA International Stadium Complex, Ranchi
Umpires: Rohan Pandit and Krishnaraj Srinath

- Jharkhand won the toss and elected to bat.

14 January 2018
Scorecard

Tripura; 169/4 (20 overs)	v	Bengal; 170/1 (18 overs)
Smit Patel 73 (57); Manoj Tiwary 1/14 (2 overs)		Shreevats Goswami 82* (57); Abhoy Negi 1/15 (3 overs)

Bengal won by 9 wickets
JSCA International Stadium Complex, Ranchi
Umpires: Jayaraman Madanagopal and Rohan Pandit

- Tripura won the toss and elected to bat.
- Abhoy Negi (Tripura) made his T20 debut.

14 January 2018
Scorecard

Assam; 148/6 (20 overs)	v	Jharkhand; 149/2 (16 overs)
Sibsankar Roy 52 (43); Monu Kumar 3/23 (4 overs)		Ishank Jaggi 68* (37); Sibsankar Roy 1/16 (2 overs)

Jharkhand won by 8 wickets
JSCA International Stadium Complex, Ranchi
Umpires: Chirra Ravikanthreddy and Krishnaraj Srinath

- Assam won the toss and elected to bat

16 January 2018
Scorecard

Assam; 143/9 (20 overs)	v	Bengal; 147/4 (17.1 overs)
Rishav Das 53 (51); Manoj Tiwary 4/23 (4 overs)		Manoj Tiwary 63* (53); Swarupam Purkayastha 2/24 (4 overs)

Bengal won by 6 wickets
JSCA International Stadium Complex, Ranchi
Umpires: Chirra Ravikanthreddy and Krishnaraj Srinath

- Bengal won the toss and elected to field.

16 January 2018
Scorecard

Odisha; 123 (19.4 overs)	v	Jharkhand; 129/2 (16.4 overs)
Govinda Poddar 64 (42); Monu Kumar 4/14 (3.4 overs)		Ishan Kishan 51 (38); Debabrata Pradhan 1/15 (2.4 overs)

Jharkhand won by 8 wickets
JSCA International Stadium Complex, Ranchi
Umpires: Jayaraman Madanagopal and Rohan Pandit

- Odisha won the toss and elected to bat.
- Atul Singh Surwar (Jharkhand) made his T20 debut.

=== North Zone ===
8 January 2018
Scorecard

Himachal Pradesh; 194/2 (20 overs)	v	Haryana; 194/8 (20 overs)
Prashant Chopra 99* (64); Ajit Chahal 1/29 (3 overs)		Harshal Patel 73 (32); Kanwar Abhinay 2/38 (4 overs)

Match tied
(Himachal Pradesh won the one-over eliminator)
Feroz Shah Kotla, Delhi
Umpires: Puttarangaiah Jayapal and Nikhil Patwardhan

- Haryana won the toss and elected to field.
- Ajit Chahal (Haryana) and Kanwar Abhinay (Himachal Pradesh) both made their T20 debuts.

8 January 2018
Scorecard

Jammu & Kashmir; 128 (20 overs)	v	Services; 130/1 (16.5 overs)
Ian Dev Singh 47 (37); Diwesh Pathania 3/28 (4 overs)		Ravi Chauhan 86* (58); Manzoor Dar 1/3 (1 over)

Services won by 9 wickets
Feroz Shah Kotla, Delhi
Umpires: Nand Kishore and Krishnamachari Srinivasan

- Jammu & Kashmir won the toss and elected to bat.
- Arun Bamal (Services) made his T20 debut.

9 January 2018
Scorecard

Punjab; 170/3 (20 overs)	v	Delhi; 168/4 (20 overs)
Manan Vohra 74 (50); Pawan Negi 2/8 (2 overs)		Gautam Gambhir 66 (54); Sandeep Sharma 1/24 (4 overs)

Punjab won by 2 runs
Feroz Shah Kotla, Delhi
Umpires: Nand Kishore and Krishnamachari Srinivasan

- Delhi won the toss and elected to field.
- Himmat Singh, Lalit Yadav, Kulwant Khejroliya (Delhi) and Abhishek Gupta (Punjab) all made their T20 debuts.

9 January 2018
Scorecard

Himachal Pradesh; 130/9 (20 overs)	v	Jammu & Kashmir; 97 (17.4 overs)
Nikhil Gangta 31 (27); Parvez Rasool 2/15 (4 overs)		Manzoor Dar 36 (23); Pankaj Jaswal 4/15 (2.4 overs)

Himachal Pradesh won by 33 runs
Feroz Shah Kotla, Delhi
Umpires: Puttarangaiah Jayapal and Nikhil Patwardhan

- Himachal Pradesh won the toss and elected to bat.

10 January 2018
Scorecard

Haryana; 153/6 (20 overs)	v	Delhi; 154/3 (17 overs)
Chaitanya Bishnoi 65 (56); Suboth Bhati 3/25 (4 overs)		Dhruv Shorey 59* (44); Ashish Hooda 1/16 (2 overs)

Delhi won by 7 wickets
Feroz Shah Kotla, Delhi
Umpires: Puttarangaiah Jayapal and Krishnamachari Srinivasan

- Delhi won the toss and elected to field.

10 January 2018
Scorecard

Services; 140/9 (20 overs)	v	Punjab; 141/2 (19.1 overs)
Amit Pachhara 37 (42); Manpreet Gony 4/18 (4 overs)		Mandeep Singh 84* (56); Diwesh Pathania 2/17 (4 overs)

Punjab won by 8 wickets
Feroz Shah Kotla, Delhi
Umpires: Nand Kishore and Nikhil Patwardhan

- Services won the toss and elected to bat.

12 January 2018
Scorecard

Jammu & Kashmir; 100/9 (20 overs)	v	Delhi; 104/2 (11.3 overs)
Parvez Rasool 37 (26); Pawan Negi 3/27 (4 overs)		Rishabh Pant 51 (33); Parvez Rasool 2/41 (4 overs)

Delhi won by 8 wickets
Feroz Shah Kotla, Delhi
Umpires: Nand Kishore and Nikhil Patwardhan

- Delhi won the toss and elected to field.

12 January 2018
Scorecard

Punjab; 134/9 (20 overs)	v	Haryana; 136/5 (17.5 overs)
Mandeep Singh 30 (18); Amit Mishra 3/23 (4 overs)		Rahul Tewatia 37* (22); Barinder Sran 3/19 (4 overs)

Haryana won by 5 wickets
Feroz Shah Kotla, Delhi
Umpires: Puttarangaiah Jayapal and Krishnamachari Srinivasan

- Punjab won the toss and elected to bat.

13 January 2018
Scorecard

Himachal Pradesh; 119/8 (20 overs)	v	Services; 122/5 (18.1 overs)
Rishi Dhawan 27 (22); Diwesh Pathania 3/16 (4 overs)		Nakul Verma 25 (25); Kanwar Abhinay 2/19 (3 overs)

Services won by 5 wickets
Feroz Shah Kotla, Delhi
Umpires: Puttarangaiah Jayapal and Krishnamachari Srinivasan

- Services won the toss and elected to field.
- Sachidanand Pandey (Services) made his T20 debut.

13 January 2018
Scorecard

Haryana; 119 (19.2 overs)	v	Jammu & Kashmir; 122/6 (18.4 overs)
Harshal Patel 28 (23); Umar Nazir 3/16 (3.2 overs)		Jatin Wadhwan 70* (61); Harshal Patel 2/18 (4 overs)

Jammu & Kashmir won by 4 wickets
Feroz Shah Kotla, Delhi
Umpires: Nand Kishore and Nikhil Patwardhan

- Jammu & Kashmir won the toss and elected to field.
- Prashant Kumar (Haryana) made his T20 debut.

14 January 2018
Scorecard

Himachal Pradesh; 144/8 (20 overs)	v	Delhi; 148/0 (11.4 overs)
Nikhil Gangta 40 (27); Pradeep Sangwan 2/39 (4 overs)		Rishabh Pant 116* (38)

Delhi won by 10 wickets
Feroz Shah Kotla, Delhi
Umpires: Nand Kishore and Nikhil Patwardhan

- Delhi won the toss and elected to field.
- Rishabh Pant (Delhi) scored the second-fastest century in a T20 match.

14 January 2018
Scorecard

Jammu & Kashmir; 164/3 (20 overs)	v	Punjab; 141 (19 overs)
Ian Dev Singh 43* (22); Harbhajan Singh 2/12 (3 overs)		Manan Vohra 53 (46); Waseem Raza 4/16 (4 overs)

Jammu & Kashmir won by 23 runs
Feroz Shah Kotla, Delhi

- Punjab won the toss and elected to field.

15 January 2018
Scorecard

Services; 140/8 (20 overs)	v	Haryana; 141/6 (19.5 overs)
Nakul Sharma 42 (32); Ajit Chahal 3/36 (4 overs)		Shivam Chauhan 54 (43); Diwesh Pathania 3/27 (3.5 overs)

Haryana won by 4 wickets
Feroz Shah Kotla, Delhi
Umpires: Nand Kishore and Nikhil Patwardhan

- Haryana won the toss and elected to field.

15 January 2018
Scorecard

Punjab; 211/4 (20 overs)	v	Himachal Pradesh; 192/5 (20 overs)
Manan Vohra 74 (42); Kanwar Abhinay 1/33 (4 overs)		Nikhil Gangta 52* (32); Mayank Markande 2/35 (4 overs)

Punjab won by 19 runs
Feroz Shah Kotla, Delhi
Umpires: Puttarangaiah Jayapal and Krishnamachari Srinivasan

- Punjab won the toss and elected to bat.
- Shubham Arora (Himachal Pradesh) made his T20 debut.

16 January 2018
Scorecard

Delhi; 225/8 (20 overs)	v	Services; 203 (19.1 overs)
Rishabh Pant 64 (32); Nitin Yadav 3/53 (3 overs)		Ravi Chauhan 53 (23); Kulwant Khejroliya 3/38 (4 overs)

Delhi won by 22 runs
Feroz Shah Kotla, Delhi
Umpires: Puttarangaiah Jayapal and Krishnamachari Srinivasan

- Services won the toss and elected to field.
