= 2021–22 Vijay Hazare Trophy Group B =

Cricket tournament

- Dates: 8 – 14 December 2021
- Administrator: BCCI
- Cricket format: List A cricket
- Tournament format: Round-robin
- Participants: 6

The 2021–22 Vijay Hazare Trophy was the twentieth season of the Vijay Hazare Trophy, a List A cricket tournament that was played in India. It was contested by 38 teams, divided into six groups, with six teams in Group B. The tournament was announced by the BCCI on 3 July 2021. Tamil Nadu won Group B to progress to the quarter-finals, with Karnataka finishing in second place to advance to the preliminary quarter-finals.

== Points table ==
Pos	Team	Pld	W	L	NR	Pts	NRR
1	Tamil Nadu	5	3	2	0	12	1.052
2	Karnataka	5	3	2	0	12	0.789
3	Bengal	5	3	2	0	12	−0.235
4	Pondicherry	5	3	2	0	12	−1.360
5	Baroda	5	2	3	0	8	0.290
6	Mumbai	5	1	4	0	4	−0.707

Source: ESPN Cricinfo

Advanced to Quarter-final
Advanced to Preliminary quarter-final

== Fixtures ==
=== Round 1 ===
8 December 2021
Scorecard

Tamil Nadu; 290/8 (50 overs)	v	Mumbai; 236 (46.4 overs)
Shahrukh Khan 66 (35); Dhawal Kulkarni 3/45 (10 overs)		Shams Mulani 75 (100); Manimaran Siddharth 3/43 (10 overs)

Tamil Nadu won by 54 runs
St Xavier's College Ground, Thumba
Umpires: Piyush Khakhar and Chirra Ravikanthreddy

- Mumbai won the toss and elected to field.
- Hardik Tamore, Sairaj Patil (Mumbai) and Sai Sudharsan (Tamil Nadu) all made their List A debuts.

8 December 2021
Scorecard

Bengal; 230 (49.4 overs)	v	Baroda; 203 (48.2 overs)
Kaif Ahmed 67 (93); Atit Sheth 4/62 (10 overs)		Krunal Pandya 37 (56); Akash Deep 3/39 (9.2 overs)

Bengal won by 27 runs
Greenfield International Stadium, Thiruvananthapuram
Umpires: Mukund Mandale and Anish Sahasrabudhe

- Baroda won the toss and elected to field.
- Abhishek Das, Geet Puri (Bengal), Pratyush Kumar and Shashwat Rawat (Baroda) all made their List A debuts.

8 December 2021
Scorecard

Karnataka; 289/6 (50 overs)	v	Pondicherry; 53 (17.4 overs)
Ravikumar Samarth 95 (107); Suboth Bhati 2/62 (10 overs)		Pavan Deshpande 16 (25); Jagadeesha Suchith 4/3 (3 overs)

Karnataka won by 236 runs
KCA Cricket Ground, Mangalapuram
Umpires: Yeshwant Barde and VM Dhokre

- Pondicherry won the toss and elected to field.
- Jayasundaram Karthikeyan (Pondicherry), K. C. Cariappa, M Venkatesh, Srinivas Sharath and Vidyadhar Patil (Karnataka) all made their List A debuts.

=== Round 2 ===
9 December 2021
Scorecard

Baroda; 210 (49.1 overs)	v	Mumbai; 100/3 (23 overs)
Vishnu Solanki 94 (100); Tanush Kotian 3/44 (10 overs)		Yashasvi Jaiswal 41* (60); Atit Sheth 1/20 (4 overs); Krunal Pandya 1/20 (4 overs)

Mumbai won by 13 runs (VJD method)
St Xavier's College Ground, Thumba
Umpires: Saurabh Dhote and Ravi Shanker

- Baroda won the toss and elected to bat.
- No further play was possible due to rain.
- Mumbai were 13 runs ahead of the VJD par score of 87 runs from 23 overs.
- Bhanu Pania (Baroda) made his List A debut.

9 December 2021
Scorecard

Karnataka; 122 (36.3 overs)	v	Tamil Nadu; 123/2 (28 overs)
Manish Pandey 40 (54); Manimaran Siddharth 4/23 (9 overs)		Baba Indrajith 51* (74); Vidyadhar Patil 1/22 (5 overs)

Tamil Nadu won by 8 wickets
Greenfield International Stadium, Thiruvananthapuram
Umpires: Piyush Khakhar and Chirra Ravikanthreddy

- Karnataka won the toss and elected to bat.

9 December 2021
Scorecard

Bengal; 264/8 (50 overs)	v	Pondicherry; 132/2 (30 overs)
Shahbaz Ahmed 85* (60); Suboth Bhati 3/70 (9 overs)		Pavan Deshpande 62* (76); Shahbaz Ahmed 1/15 (5 overs)

Pondicherry won by 8 runs (VJD method)
KCA Cricket Ground, Mangalapuram
Umpires: Mukund Mandale and Anish Sahasrabudhe

- Bengal won the toss and elected to bat.
- No further play was possible due to rain.
- Pondicherry were 8 runs ahead of the VJD par score of 124 runs from 30 overs.
- Bharat Sharma (Pondicherry) made his List A debut.

=== Round 3 ===
11 December 2021
Scorecard

Pondicherry; 82 (26.4 overs)	v	Baroda; 85/5 (27.1 overs)
Iqlas Naha 37 (36); Dhruv Patel 3/4 (4 overs)		Aditya Waghmode 22 (45); Sagar Udeshi 3/14 (10 overs)

Baroda won by 5 wickets
St Xavier's College Ground, Thumba
Umpires: Yeshwant Barde and VM Dhokre

- Baroda won the toss and elected to field.
- The match was reduced to 49 overs per side due to rain.

11 December 2021
Scorecard

Tamil Nadu; 295/8 (50 overs)	v	Bengal; 149 (39.1 overs)
Dinesh Karthik 87 (95); Akash Deep 3/64 (10 overs )		Abhishek Das 30 (37); Ragupathy Silambarasan 4/28 (6.1 overs)

Tamil Nadu won by 146 runs
Greenfield International Stadium, Thiruvananthapuram
Umpires: Saurabh Dhote and Ravi Shankar

- Bengal won the toss and elected to field.

11 December 2021
Scorecard

Mumbai; 208/9 (50 overs)	v	Karnataka; 211/3 (45.3 overs)
Yashasvi Jaiswal 61 (91); Praveen Dubey 4/29 (10 overs)		Ravikumar Samarth 96* (129); Prashant Solanki 2/48 (10 overs)

Karnataka won by 7 wickets
KCA Cricket Ground, Mangalapuram
Umpires: Piyush Khakhar and Chirra Ravikanthreddy

- Mumbai won the toss and elected to bat.

=== Round 4 ===
12 December 2021
Scorecard

Pondicherry; 225/9 (49 overs)	v	Tamil Nadu; 204/9 (44 overs)
Fabid Ahmed 87* (84); Washington Sundar 5/48 (10 overs)		Dinesh Karthik 65 (72); Fabid Ahmed 2/22 (9 overs)

Pondicherry won by 1 run (DLS Method)
St Xavier's College Ground, Thumba
Umpires: Mukund Mandale and Anish Sahasrabudhe

- Tamil Nadu won the toss and elected to field.
- Tamil Nadu were set a revised target of 206 runs from 44 overs due to rain.

12 December 2021
Scorecard

Baroda; 176 (48.3 overs)	v	Karnataka; 150/4 (38.4 overs)
Bhanu Pania 40 (64); K. C. Cariappa 3/28 (10 overs)		Krishnamurthy Siddharth 46* (78); Kartik Kakade 1/11 (4 overs)

Karnataka won by 6 wickets (DLS Method)
Greenfield International Stadium, Thiruvananthapuram
Umpires: Yeshwant Barde and VM Dhokre

- Karnataka won the toss and elected to field.
- Karnataka were set a revised target of 147 runs from 42 overs due to rain.

12 December 2021
Scorecard

Bengal; 318/7 (50 overs)	v	Mumbai; 223/8 (41 overs)
Anustup Majumdar 110 (122); Mohit Avasthi 4/63 (10 overs)		Suryakumar Yadav 49 (34); Pradipta Pramanik 3/33 (9 overs)

Bengal won by 67 runs (DLS Method)
KCA Cricket Ground, Mangalapuram
Umpires: Saurabh Dhote and Ravi Shankar

- Mumbai won the toss and elected to field.
- Aakarshit Gomel (Mumbai) and Ranjot Khaira (Bengal) both made their List A debuts.
- Mumbai were set a revised target of 291 runs from 41 overs due to rain.

=== Round 5 ===
14 December 2021
Scorecard

Bengal; 253/6 (48.3 overs)	v	Karnataka; 252/8 (50 overs)
Sudeep Chatterjee 63 (56); Prateek Jain 3/56 (9.3 overs)		Manish Pandey 90 (85); Pradipta Pramanik 4/48 (10 overs)

Bengal won by 4 wickets
St Xavier's College Ground, Thumba
Umpires: Chirra Ravikanthreddy and Ravi Shankar

- Karnataka won the toss and elected to bat.

14 December 2021
Scorecard

Pondicherry; 157 (46 overs)	v	Mumbai; 139 (48.1 overs)
Paras Dogra 58 (84); Mohit Avasthi 3/19 (7 overs)		Aakarshit Gomel 70 (127); Fabid Ahmed 4/16 (10 overs)

Pondicherry won by 18 runs
Greenfield International Stadium, Thiruvananthapuram
Umpires: Mukund Mandale and Anish Sahasrabudhe

- Pondicherry won the toss and elected to bat.
- Parikshit Valsangkar and Prasad Pawar (Mumbai) both made their List A debuts.

14 December 2021
Scorecard

Baroda; 114 (39 overs)	v	Tamil Nadu; 73 (20.2 overs)
Krunal Pandya 38 (82); Washington Sundar 2/15 (8 overs)		Sanjay Yadav 19 (25); Bhargav Bhatt 3/27 (9 overs)

Baroda won by 41 runs
KCA Cricket Ground, Mangalapuram
Umpires: Yeshwant Barde and VM Dhokre

- Baroda won the toss and elected to bat.
- Gurjindersingh Maan (Baroda) made his List A debut.
