= New Zealand cricket team in India in 2016–17 =

International cricket tour

	India	New Zealand
- Dates: 16 September – 29 October 2016
Captains	Virat Kohli (Tests); MS Dhoni (ODIs)	Kane Williamson; Ross Taylor (2nd Test)

Test series
- Result: India won the 3-match series 3–0
Most runs	Cheteshwar Pujara (373)	Luke Ronchi (200)
Most wickets	Ravichandran Ashwin (27)	Trent Boult (10); Mitchell Santner (10)
- Player of the series: Ravichandran Ashwin (Ind)

One Day International series
- Results: India won the 5-match series 3–2
Most runs	Virat Kohli (358)	Tom Latham (244)
Most wickets	Amit Mishra (15)	Tim Southee (7)
- Player of the series: Amit Mishra (Ind)

The New Zealand cricket team toured India in September and October 2016 to play three Test matches and five One Day Internationals (ODIs). India won the Test series 3–0 and the ODI series 3–2.

In April 2016, the Board of Control for Cricket in India (BCCI) announced the proposition of one of the Test matches being a day/night game. New Zealand Cricket stated that "a number of factors were yet to be finalised before the match could be confirmed". In June 2016, the BCCI confirmed the fixtures for India's 2016/17 season, but there was no mention of a day/night Test. However, it was reported that a senior official of the Cricket Association of Bengal had confirmed that the Test match in Kolkata would be a day/night game. At the end of June the dates and times of the matches were announced, with the BCCI stating that all the Tests will start at 9:30am local time. In September 2016, the BCCI confirmed that there would be no day/night Tests in India during the 2016–17 season.

In September 2016 the BCCI moved the second ODI from 19 October to 20 October because of Karva Chauth. The first Test in Kanpur was India's 500th Test match and the second Test in Kolkata was India's 250th Test match at home. The first ODI in Dharamshala was India's 900th ODI match.

Following the conclusion of the second Test, there were reports that the Lodha Committee had frozen the BCCI's bank accounts. The BCCI then threatened to cancel all the remaining fixtures of the tour. The chief executive of New Zealand Cricket, David White, said that their team would continue with the tour and were preparing to travel to Indore for the third Test. However, the Lodha Committee clarified what it had said, saying they did not ask for the BCCI's accounts to be frozen, but requested that two specific payments were stopped.

== Squads ==
Tests		ODIs	
India	New Zealand	India	New Zealand
Virat Kohli (c); Ajinkya Rahane (vc); Ravichandran Ashwin; ~~Shikhar Dhawan~~; Gautam Gambhir; Ravindra Jadeja; ~~Bhuvneshwar Kumar~~; Amit Mishra; Karun Nair; Cheteshwar Pujara; ~~KL Rahul~~; Wriddhiman Saha (wk); Mohammed Shami; ~~Ishant Sharma~~; Rohit Sharma; Shardul Thakur; Murali Vijay; Jayant Yadav; Umesh Yadav	Kane Williamson (c); Ross Taylor (vc); Trent Boult; Doug Bracewell; ~~Mark Craig~~; Martin Guptill; Matt Henry; Tom Latham; James Neesham; Henry Nicholls; Jeetan Patel; Luke Ronchi (wk); Mitchell Santner; Ish Sodhi; ~~Tim Southee~~; Neil Wagner; BJ Watling (wk)	MS Dhoni (c, wk); Virat Kohli (vc); Jasprit Bumrah; Kedar Jadhav; Dhawal Kulkarni; Amit Mishra; Manish Pandey; Hardik Pandya; Axar Patel; Ajinkya Rahane; ~~Suresh Raina~~; Rohit Sharma; Mandeep Singh; Jayant Yadav; Umesh Yadav	Kane Williamson (c); Corey Anderson; Trent Boult; Doug Bracewell; Anton Devcich; Martin Guptill; Matt Henry; Tom Latham; James Neesham; Luke Ronchi (wk); Mitchell Santner; Ish Sodhi; Tim Southee; Ross Taylor; BJ Watling (wk)

Tim Southee was ruled out of New Zealand's Test squad due to injury and was replaced by Matt Henry. Mark Craig suffered an injury in the first Test and was ruled out of the rest of the series. He was replaced by Jeetan Patel. After the end of the first Test, KL Rahul was replaced by Gautam Gambhir due to injury and Ishant Sharma was replaced by Jayant Yadav due to illness. Shikhar Dhawan was ruled out of the third Test with a fractured finger and replaced by Karun Nair. Bhuvneshwar Kumar was ruled out of the third Test with a back injury and was replaced by Shardul Thakur. Suresh Raina was not included in the squad for final two ODIs because he was yet to regain full fitness after an illness.

== Tour match ==
=== Three-day: Mumbai vs New Zealanders ===
16–18 September 2016
Scorecard

New Zealanders	v	Mumbai
324/7d (75 overs); Tom Latham 55 (97); Balwinder Sandhu 2/21 (11 overs)		464/8d (114 overs); Suryakumar Yadav 103 (86); Ish Sodhi 2/132 (20 overs)
235 (66.4 overs); Luke Ronchi 107 (112); Parikshit Valsangkar 3/41 (12.4 overs)

Match drawn
Feroz Shah Kotla, Delhi
Umpires: Anil Chaudhary (Ind) and Virender Sharma (Ind)

- Mumbai won the toss and elected to field.
- 15 players per side (11 batting, 11 fielding).

== Test series ==
=== 1st Test ===
22–26 September 2016
Scorecard

India	v	New Zealand
318 (97 overs); Murali Vijay 65 (170); Trent Boult 3/67 (20 overs)		262 (95.5 overs); Kane Williamson 75 (137); Ravindra Jadeja 5/73 (34 overs)
377/5d (107.2 overs); Cheteshwar Pujara 78 (152); Mitchell Santner 2/79 (32.2 overs)		236 (87.3 overs); Luke Ronchi 80 (120); Ravichandran Ashwin 6/132 (35.3 overs)

India won by 197 runs
Green Park Stadium, Kanpur
Umpires: Richard Kettleborough (Eng) and Rod Tucker (Aus)
Player of the match: Ravindra Jadeja (Ind)

- India won the toss and elected to bat.
- Rain stopped play after tea on Day 2 with no further play possible.
- This was India's 500th Test match.
- Ravichandran Ashwin (Ind) became the second-fastest bowler to reach 200 Test wickets.

=== 2nd Test ===
30 September–4 October 2016
Scorecard

India	v	New Zealand
316 (104.5 overs); Cheteshwar Pujara 87 (219); Matt Henry 3/46 (15 overs)		204 (53 overs); Jeetan Patel 47 (47); Bhuvneshwar Kumar 5/48 (15 overs)
263 (76.5 overs); Rohit Sharma 82 (132); Trent Boult 3/38 (17.5 overs)		197 (81.1 overs); Tom Latham 74 (148); Ravindra Jadeja 3/41 (20 overs)

India won by 178 runs
Eden Gardens, Kolkata
Umpires: Richard Kettleborough (Eng) and Rod Tucker (Aus)
Player of the match: Wriddhiman Saha (Ind)

- India won the toss and elected to bat.
- There was a two-hour rain delay during the afternoon of Day 2.
- This was India's 250th Test match at home.
- Ross Taylor stood as captain for New Zealand, as Kane Williamson had a fever.
- With this victory, India returned to the top of the ICC Test Championship rankings.
- Fifteen dismissals in this match were by LBW, the most for a Test in India.

=== 3rd Test ===
8–12 October 2016
Scorecard

India	v	New Zealand
557/5d (169 overs); Virat Kohli 211 (366); Trent Boult 2/113 (32 overs)		299 (90.2 overs); Martin Guptill 72 (144); Ravichandran Ashwin 6/81 (27.2 overs)
216/3d (49 overs); Cheteshwar Pujara 101* (148); Jeetan Patel 2/56 (14 overs)		153 (44.5 overs); Ross Taylor 32 (25); Ravichandran Ashwin 7/59 (13.5 overs)

India won by 321 runs
Holkar Stadium, Indore
Umpires: Kumar Dharmasena (SL) and Bruce Oxenford (Aus)
Player of the match: Ravichandran Ashwin (Ind)

- India won the toss and elected to bat.
- This was the first Test to be hosted at this venue.
- Ajinkya Rahane became the 36th player for India to reach 2,000 runs in Tests.
- Virat Kohli became the first player to score two double centuries as captain for India in Tests.
- Virat Kohli and Ajinkya Rahane made the highest fourth-wicket partnership for India in Tests (365 runs).
- Ravichandran Ashwin (Ind) recorded his best bowling figures in both an innings and a match.
- This was India's second-biggest win in terms of runs and New Zealand's second-biggest defeat, also in terms of runs, in Tests.

== ODI series ==
=== 1st ODI ===
16 October 2016
13:30 IST (D/N)
Scorecard

New Zealand; 190 (43.5 overs)	v	India; 194/4 (33.1 overs)
Tom Latham 79* (98); Hardik Pandya 3/31 (7 overs)		Virat Kohli 85* (81); Ish Sodhi 1/34 (4.1 overs)

India won by 6 wickets
Himachal Pradesh Cricket Association Stadium, Dharamshala
Umpires: Bruce Oxenford (Aus) and Chettithody Shamshuddin (Ind)
Player of the match: Hardik Pandya (Ind)

- India won the toss and elected to field.
- This was India's 900th ODI, the most any country has played.
- Hardik Pandya (Ind) made his ODI debut.
- Tim Southee (NZ) played in his 100th ODI.
- Amit Mishra (Ind) took his 50th ODI wicket when he dismissed Doug Bracewell.
- Tom Latham became the tenth batsman and the first player from New Zealand to carry his bat in an ODI.

=== 2nd ODI ===
20 October 2016
13:30 IST (D/N)
Scorecard

New Zealand; 242/9 (50 overs)	v	India; 236 (49.3 overs)
Kane Williamson 118 (128); Jasprit Bumrah 3/35 (10 overs)		Kedar Jadhav 41 (37); Tim Southee 3/52 (9.3 overs)

New Zealand won by 6 runs
Feroz Shah Kotla Ground, Delhi
Umpires: Anil Chaudhary (Ind) and Bruce Oxenford (Aus)
Player of the match: Kane Williamson (NZ)

- India won the toss and elected to field.
- This was India's 400th ODI loss.
- Rohit Sharma (Ind) played in his 150th ODI.
- Luke Ronchi (NZ) completed 100 dismissals as a wicket-keeper.
- Kane Williamson became the fifth player to score eight or more centuries for New Zealand in ODIs, the third New Zealand captain to score a century against India and the highest score against India in India.
- This was the first time in 13 years that New Zealand won an ODI match against India in India, and the first time that New Zealand won at the Feroz Shah Kotla.

=== 3rd ODI ===
23 October 2016
13:30 IST (D/N)
Scorecard

New Zealand; 285 (49.4 overs)	v	India; 289/3 (48.2 overs)
Tom Latham 61 (72); Kedar Jadhav 3/29 (5 overs)		Virat Kohli 154* (134); Matt Henry 2/56 (9.2 overs)

India won by 7 wickets
Punjab Cricket Association IS Bindra Stadium, Mohali
Umpires: Bruce Oxenford (Aus) and Chettithody Shamshuddin (Ind)
Player of the match: Virat Kohli (Ind)

- India won the toss and elected to field.
- James Neesham and Matt Henry's 84-run partnership is New Zealand's highest 9th-wicket partnership in ODIs.
- MS Dhoni passed 9,000 runs and hit the most sixes for India in ODIs and also the most sixes by a captain.
- Virat Kohli (Ind) scored his 26th century in ODIs. His 154 not out is the highest by any player on this ground.
- Virat Kohli's century was his 14th in a winning chase making him the joint-highest in such a scenario.
- Virat Kohli is the quickest to score 3,000 runs at home in terms of innings in ODIs (63).
- MS Dhoni became the first wicket-keeper to make 150 stumpings in ODIs.

=== 4th ODI ===
26 October 2016
13:30 IST (D/N)
Scorecard

New Zealand; 260/7 (50 overs)	v	India; 241 (48.4 overs)
Martin Guptill 72 (84); Amit Mishra 2/41 (10 overs)		Ajinkya Rahane 57 (70); Tim Southee 3/40 (9 overs)

New Zealand won by 19 runs
JSCA International Stadium Complex, Ranchi
Umpires: Anil Chaudhary (Ind) and Bruce Oxenford (Aus)
Player of the match: Martin Guptill (NZ)

- New Zealand won the toss and elected to bat.

=== 5th ODI ===
29 October 2016
13:30 IST (D/N)
Scorecard

India; 269/6 (50 overs)	v	New Zealand; 79 (23.1 overs)
Rohit Sharma 70 (65); Trent Boult 2/52 (10 overs)		Kane Williamson 27 (40); Amit Mishra 5/18 (6 overs)

India won by 190 runs
Dr. Y.S. Rajasekhara Reddy ACA-VDCA Cricket Stadium, Visakhapatnam
Umpires: C. K. Nandan (Ind) and Bruce Oxenford (Aus)
Player of the match: Amit Mishra (Ind)

- India won the toss and elected to bat.
- Jayant Yadav (Ind) made his ODI debut.
- C. K. Nandan (Ind) stood in his first ODI as an umpire.
- This was New Zealand's lowest total against India and their shortest completed innings in an ODI.
- Amit Mishra (Ind) recorded the best bowling figure for a player for India against New Zealand in ODIs. and last ODI
- Virat Kohli (Ind) scored the most runs by any player in an India-New Zealand bilateral series played in India (358).
