= KM Asif =

Indian cricketer (born 1993)

Personal information
- Born: 24 July 1993 (age 33); Edavanna, Kerala, India
- Batting: Right-handed
- Bowling: Right-arm medium
- Role: Bowler

Domestic team information
- Years: Team
- 2018–: Kerala (squad no. 24)
- 2018,2021: Chennai Super Kings (squad no. 24)
- 2023: Rajasthan Royals

Career statistics
Competition	FC	LA	T20
Matches	5	11	36
Runs scored	8	6	2
Batting average	2.66	1.50	2.00
100s/50s	0/0	0/0	0/0
Top score	7*	2*	1*
Balls bowled	426	468	698
Wickets	4	18	40
Bowling average	65.00	25.50	24.22
5 wickets in innings	0	0	0
10 wickets in match	0	–	–
Best bowling	2/23	4/34	3/15
Catches/stumpings	3/–	3/–	8/–
- Source: ESPNcricinfo, 20 March 2025

KM Asif also known as Mohammed Asif (born 24 July 1993) is an Indian cricketer who represents Kerala in domestic cricket and previously played for Chennai Super Kings and Rajasthan Royals in Indian Premier League (IPL). He is a right-handed batsman and right-arm medium pacer.

== Early life ==
Asif has been mentored by Biju George.

In 2016, he worked in Dubai as a storekeeper. But he soon returned home to attend a fast-bowling trial conducted across India. He also attended open trials for the UAE national team at the ICC Academy but was rejected and soon returned to India.

== Domestic career ==
Asif hasn't played any form of age-group cricket for Kerala. He made his Twenty20 debut for Kerala in the 2017–18 Zonal T20 League on 12 January 2018. He was the joint-highest wicket-taker for Kerala in the tournament with 5 wickets from two matches. He made his List A debut for Kerala in the 2017–18 Vijay Hazare Trophy on 9 February 2018.

In August 2018, he was one of five players that were suspended for three games in the 2018–19 Vijay Hazare Trophy, after showing dissent against Kerala's captain, Sachin Baby.

He finished as Kerala's joint-highest wicket-taker in the 2019-20 Vijay Hazare Trophy with 14 wickets from seven matches. He made his first-class debut for Kerala on 9 December 2019 in the 2019–20 Ranji Trophy.

== Indian Premier League ==
In January 2018, he was bought by the Chennai Super Kings in the 2018 IPL auction. He made his IPL debut that season against Delhi Daredevils after an injury to Deepak Chahar. In February 2022, he was again bought by the Chennai Super Kings in the auction for the 2022 Indian Premier League tournament. In the 2023 auction, he was bought by Rajasthan Royals for INR 30 lakh.
