= List of 2018 Indian Premier League personnel changes =

This is a list of all personnel changes for the 2018 Indian Premier League (IPL). This was the third season to have all players, apart from a selection of retained players, return to the auction pool (first in 2011, second in 2014)

== Player retention ==
=== Retention policy ===
The eight IPL franchise teams could retain a maximum of five players from their squad, out of which only three could be retained during the retention period. The teams could also use a maximum of three right-to-match cards at the auction (a maximum of two, if the franchise retained three players during the retention period). The other restrictions on player retention were: a maximum of three capped Indian players could be retained, and only two overseas players and two uncapped Indian players could be retained. The salary deduction for every retained player from the franchise's salary purse was stipulated to be ₹15 crore, ₹11 crore and ₹7 crore if three players were retained; ₹12.5 crore and ₹8.5 crore if two players were retained; and ₹12.5 crore if only one player was retained. For retaining an uncapped player, salary deduction was set at ₹3 crore.

Chennai and Rajasthan, two franchises which were returning after serving a two-year suspension, were allowed to retain players from their respective 2015 squads who were not part of the squads of any of the other six teams in 2017. This meant that Chennai could retain from a pool of 13 players whereas Rajasthan had 6 players to choose from.

=== Retained players ===
The franchises were required to submit their retention lists by 4 January 2018. Player retention was broadcast live on Star Sports, making it the first time that player retention was telecasted.

S.No	Nat	Player	Salary	Purse deduction
Chennai Super Kings
1	(India)	MS Dhoni	₹15 crore (US$1.6 million)	₹15 crore (US$1.6 million)
2	(India)	Suresh Raina	₹11 crore (US$1.1 million)	₹11 crore (US$1.1 million)
3	(India)	Ravindra Jadeja	₹7 crore (US$726,897.50)	₹7 crore (US$726,897.50)
Delhi Capitals
1	(India)	Rishabh Pant	₹8 crore (US$830,740.00)	₹15 crore (US$1.6 million)
2	(South Africa)	Chris Morris	₹7.1 crore (US$737,281.80)	₹11 crore (US$1.1 million)
3	(India)	Shreyas Iyer	₹7 crore (US$726,897.50)	₹7 crore (US$726,897.50)
Kings XI Punjab
1	(India)	Axar Patel	₹6.75 crore (US$700,936.90)	₹12.5 crore (US$1.3 million)
Kolkata Knight Riders
1	(Trinidad and Tobago)	Sunil Narine	₹8.5 crore (US$882,661.30)	₹12.5 crore (US$1.3 million)
2	(Jamaica)	Andre Russell	₹7 crore (US$726,897.50)	₹8.5 crore (US$882,661.30)
Mumbai Indians
1	(India)	Rohit Sharma	₹15 crore (US$1.6 million)	₹15 crore (US$1.6 million)
2	(India)	Hardik Pandya	₹11 crore (US$1.1 million)	₹11 crore (US$1.1 million)
3	(India)	Jasprit Bumrah	₹7 crore (US$726,897.50)	₹7 crore (US$726,897.50)
Rajasthan Royals
1	(Australia)	Steve Smith	₹12 crore (US$1.2 million)	₹12.5 crore (US$1.3 million)
Royal Challengers Bangalore
1	(India)	Virat Kohli	₹17 crore (US$1.8 million)	₹17 crore (US$1.8 million)
2	(South Africa)	AB de Villiers	₹11 crore (US$1.1 million)	₹11 crore (US$1.1 million)
3	(India)	Sarfaraz Khan	₹1.75 crore (US$181,724)	₹3 crore (US$311,528)
Sunrisers Hyderabad
1	(Australia)	David Warner	₹12 crore (US$1.2 million)	₹12.5 crore (US$1.3 million)
2	(India)	Bhuvneshwar Kumar	₹8.5 crore (US$882,661.30)	₹8.5 crore (US$882,661.30)

Team summary
Team	Retained	Rights to match	Salary cap deduction	Purse left
Chennai	3	2	₹33 crore (US$3.4 million)	₹47 crore (US$4.9 million)
Delhi	3	2	₹33 crore (US$3.4 million)	₹47 crore (US$4.9 million)
Punjab	1	3	₹12.5 crore (US$1.3 million)	₹67.5 crore (US$7.0 million)
Kolkata	2	3	₹21 crore (US$2.2 million)	₹59 crore (US$6.1 million)
Mumbai	3	2	₹33 crore (US$3.4 million)	₹47 crore (US$4.9 million)
Rajasthan	1	3	₹12.5 crore (US$1.3 million)	₹67.5 crore (US$7.0 million)
Bangalore	3	2	₹31 crore (US$3.2 million)	₹49 crore (US$5.1 million)
Hyderabad	2	3	₹21 crore (US$2.2 million)	₹59 crore (US$6.1 million)

== Auction ==
The player auction for the 2018 Indian Premier League was held in Bangalore on 27 and 28 January 2018. The salary cap for the season was increased from ₹66 crore to ₹80 crore, with all franchises needing to spend at least 75 percent of the amount. In total 1122 players signed up to be a part of the auction. The team requested an addition of 9 players in the IPL longlist including Nepalese spinner Sandeep Lamichhane who became the first Nepalese to be listed in IPL auction. The list was shortlisted to the total of 578 players including 360 Indians. This was the first time that both capped and uncapped players were going to be auctioned on the same day. The shortlist included 62 capped Indians and 298 uncapped Indian cricketers along with 182 capped overseas cricketers, 34 uncapped overseas players and 2 cricketers from Associate Nations. The players were divided in sets. Sets 1 and 2 consisted of marquee players such as Ravichandran Ashwin, Yuvraj Singh, Shikhar Dhawan, Chris Gayle and Ajinkya Rahane. Other players, were categorized according to the combination of capped or uncapped and their specialisation:

Specialisation	Capped sets	Uncapped sets
Marquee	1 and 2	
Batsmen	3, 13, 23 and 33	8, 17, 28, 36, 43 and 48
All-rounders	4, 14, 24, 34, 41, 46 and 51	9, 18, 29, 37, 44, 49, 53, 55, 57, 58, 59, 60, 61 and 62
Wicketkeepers	5, 20 and 25	10, 21, 30 and 38
Fast bowlers	6, 15, 26, 35, 42, 47 and 52	11, 19, 31, 39, 45, 50, 54 and 56
Spin bowlers	7, 16 and 27	12, 22, 32 and 40

=== Summary ===
169 players (113 Indians and 56 Overseas) were sold at auction. Ben Stokes fetched the highest bid of ₹12.5 crore (US$1.95 million). Jaydev Unadkat was the most costly Indian player at ₹11.5 crore (US$1.80 million). Among uncapped players Krunal Pandya was most expensive at ₹8.8 crore(US$1.38 million). Many prominent players such as Lasith Malinga, Dale Steyn, Ishant Sharma, Hashim Amla and Joe Root remain unsold.

Team summary
Team	Funds Remaining (₹ in Lacs)	Rights to Match Used	In Auction			Overall (including Retained)		
Team	Funds Remaining (₹ in Lacs)	Rights to Match Used	Uncapped Players	Overseas Players	Total Players	Uncapped Players	Overseas Players	Total Players
Chennai	650	2	8	8	22	8	8	25
Delhi	160	2	9	7	22	9	8	25
Punjab	10	3	7	7	20	7	7	21
Kolkata	0	3	9	5	17	9	7	19
Mumbai	65	2	13	8	22	13	8	25
Rajasthan	165	2	13	7	22	13	8	23
Bangalore	15	2	7	7	21	8	8	24
Hyderabad	65	3	11	7	23	11	8	25

Maximum overseas players: 8; Squad size- Min:18 and Max:25; Budget:₹80 Crore

Country	Capped		Uncapped		Total	
Country	Entered	Sold	Entered	Sold	Entered	Sold
India	62	42	300	71	362	113
Australia	39	15	15	2	54	17
South Africa	33	6	8	1	41	8
West Indies	26	5	8	2	34	7
England	23	8	1	0	24	8
New Zealand	23	7	1	0	24	7
Afghanistan|2013	10	3	1	1	11	4
Sri Lanka	18	2	0	0	18	2
Bangladesh	6	2	0	0	6	2
Zimbabwe	4	0	0	0	4	0
Ireland	1	0	0	0	1	0
Nepal	Associate Nation				1	1
Canada	Associate Nation				1	0
Total	245	90	334	77	581	169

Note: Associate players are not classified as either Capped or uncapped.

=== Sold players ===
The players from Set-1 to 11 were auctioned on Day 1. The players from Set-12 to 19 were auctioned on Day 2. Later in Day 2, players from Set-20 to 62 were auctioned through accelerated process. In later half, the remaining unsold and left players chosen by teams were recalled into auctioned. 64 players were called into Recall Round-1 and 15 into Recall Round-2.

Set No	Set	Name	Country	Playing Role	IPL Matches	Capped / Uncapped /Associate	Reserve Price (in ₹ Lacs)	IPL 2018 Team	Auctioned Price (in ₹ Lacs)	IPL 2015 Team	IPL Team(s)
1	M1	Shikhar Dhawan	India	Batsman	127	Capped	200	Sunrisers Hyderabad^{[RTM]}	520	Sunrisers Hyderabad	Sunrisers Hyderabad, Deccan Chargers, Delhi Daredevils, Mumbai Indians
1	M1	Ravichandran Ashwin	India	All-Rounder	111	Capped	200	Kings XI Punjab	760	Rising Pune Supergiant*	Rising Pune Supergiant, Chennai Super Kings
1	M1	Kieron Pollard	Trinidad and Tobago	All-Rounder	123	Capped	200	Mumbai Indians^{[RTM]}	540	Mumbai Indians	Mumbai Indians
1	M1	Ben Stokes	England	All-Rounder	12	Capped	200	Rajasthan Royals	1250	Rising Pune Supergiant	Rising Pune Supergiant
1	M1	Faf du Plessis	South Africa	Batsman	53	Capped	150	Chennai Super Kings^{[RTM]}	160	Rising Pune Supergiant	Rising Pune Supergiant, Chennai Super Kings
1	M1	Ajinkya Rahane	India	Batsman	111	Capped	200	Rajasthan Royals^{[RTM]}	400	Rising Pune Supergiant	Rising Pune Supergiant, Mumbai Indians, Rajasthan Royals
1	M1	Mitchell Starc	Australia	Bowler	27	Capped	200	Kolkata Knight Riders	940		Royal Challengers Bangalore
2	M2	Harbhajan Singh	India	Bowler	136	Capped	200	Chennai Super Kings	200	Mumbai Indians	Mumbai Indians
2	M2	Shakib Al Hasan	Bangladesh	All-Rounder	43	Capped	100	Sunrisers Hyderabad	200	Kolkata Knight Riders	Kolkata Knight Riders
2	M2	Glenn Maxwell	Australia	All-Rounder	57	Capped	200	Delhi Daredevils	900	Kings XI Punjab	Kings XI Punjab, Delhi Daredevils, Mumbai Indians
2	M2	Gautam Gambhir	India	Batsman	148	Capped	200	Delhi Daredevils	280	Kolkata Knight Riders	Kolkata Knight Riders, Delhi Daredevils
2	M2	Dwayne Bravo	Trinidad and Tobago	All-Rounder	106	Capped	200	Chennai Super Kings^{[RTM]}	640	Gujarat Lions*	Gujarat Lions, Chennai Super Kings, Mumbai Indians
2	M2	Kane Williamson	New Zealand	Batsman	15	Capped	150	Sunrisers Hyderabad	300	Sunrisers Hyderabad	Sunrisers Hyderabad
2	M2	Yuvraj Singh	India	All-Rounder	120	Capped	200	Kings XI Punjab	200	Sunrisers Hyderabad	Sunrisers Hyderabad, Delhi Daredevils, Kings XI Punjab, Royal Challengers Bangalore, Pune Warriors
3	BA1	Karun Nair	India	Batsman	55	Capped	50	Kings XI Punjab	560	Delhi Daredevils	Delhi Daredevils, Rajasthan Royals, Royal Challengers Bangalore
3	BA1	KL Rahul	India	Batsman	39	Capped	200	Kings XI Punjab	1100	Royal Challengers Bangalore*	Royal Challengers Bangalore, Sunrisers Hyderabad
3	BA1	David Miller	South Africa	Batsman	66	Capped	150	Kings XI Punjab^{[RTM]}	300	Kings XI Punjab	Kings XI Punjab
3	BA1	Aaron Finch	Australia	Batsman	65	Capped	150	Kings XI Punjab	620	Gujarat Lions	Gujarat Lions, Delhi Daredevils, Mumbai Indians, Rajasthan Royals, Pune Warriors, Sunrisers Hyderabad
3	BA1	Brendon McCullum	New Zealand	Batsman	103	Capped	200	Royal Challengers Bangalore	360	Gujarat Lions	Gujarat Lions, Chennai Super Kings, Kolkata Knight Riders, Kochi Tuskers Kerala
3	BA1	Jason Roy	England	Batsman	3	Capped	150	Delhi Daredevils	150	Gujarat Lions	Gujarat Lions
3	BA1	Chris Lynn	Australia	Batsman	12	Capped	200	Kolkata Knight Riders	960	Kolkata Knight Riders	Kolkata Knight Riders, Deccan Chargers, Sunrisers Hyderabad
3	BA1	Manish Pandey	India	Batsman	103	Capped	100	Sunrisers Hyderabad	1100	Kolkata Knight Riders	Kolkata Knight Riders, Mumbai Indians, Royal Challengers Bangalore, Pune Warriors
4	AL1	Chris Woakes	England	All-Rounder	13	Capped	200	Royal Challengers Bangalore	740	Kolkata Knight Riders	Kolkata Knight Riders
4	AL1	Carlos Brathwaite	Barbados	All-Rounder	10	Capped	100	Sunrisers Hyderabad	200	Delhi Daredevils	Delhi Daredevils
4	AL1	Shane Watson	Australia	All-Rounder	102	Capped	100	Chennai Super Kings	400	Royal Challengers Bangalore	Royal Challengers Bangalore, Rajasthan Royals
4	AL1	Kedar Jadhav	India	All-Rounder	64	Capped	200	Chennai Super Kings	780	Royal Challengers Bangalore	Royal Challengers Bangalore, Delhi Daredevils, Kochi Tuskers Kerala
4	AL1	Colin de Grandhomme	New Zealand	All-Rounder	12	Capped	75	Royal Challengers Bangalore	220	Kolkata Knight Riders	Kolkata Knight Riders
4	AL1	Yusuf Pathan	India	All-Rounder	149	Capped	75	Sunrisers Hyderabad	190	Kolkata Knight Riders	Kolkata Knight Riders, Rajasthan Royals
4	AL1	Colin Munro	New Zealand	All-Rounder	4	Capped	50	Delhi Daredevils	190		Kolkata Knight Riders, Mumbai Indians
4	AL1	Stuart Binny	India	All-Rounder	80	Capped	50	Rajasthan Royals	50	Royal Challengers Bangalore	Royal Challengers Bangalore, Mumbai Indians, Rajasthan Royals
4	AL1	Marcus Stoinis	Australia	All-Rounder	12	Capped	200	Kings XI Punjab^{[RTM]}	620	Kings XI Punjab	Kings XI Punjab, Delhi Daredevils
4	AL1	Moeen Ali	England	All-Rounder		Capped	150	Royal Challengers Bangalore	170		
5	WK1	Quinton de Kock	South Africa	Wicketkeeper	26	Capped	200	Royal Challengers Bangalore	280	Delhi Daredevils*	Delhi Daredevils, Sunrisers Hyderabad
5	WK1	Wriddhiman Saha	India	Wicketkeeper	104	Capped	100	Sunrisers Hyderabad	500	Kings XI Punjab	Kings XI Punjab, Chennai Super Kings, Kolkata Knight Riders
5	WK1	Dinesh Karthik	India	Wicketkeeper	152	Capped	200	Kolkata Knight Riders	740	Gujarat Lions	Gujarat Lions, Delhi Daredevils, Kings XI Punjab, Mumbai Indians, Royal Challengers Bangalore
5	WK1	Robin Uthappa	India	Wicketkeeper	149	Capped	200	Kolkata Knight Riders ^{[RTM]}	640	Kolkata Knight Riders	Kolkata Knight Riders, Mumbai Indians, Royal Challengers Bangalore, Pune Warriors
5	WK1	Sanju Samson	India	Wicketkeeper	66	Capped	100	Rajasthan Royals	800	Delhi Daredevils	Kolkata Knight Riders, Delhi Daredevils, Rajasthan Royals
5	WK1	Ambati Rayudu	India	Wicketkeeper	114	Capped	50	Chennai Super Kings	220	Mumbai Indians	Mumbai Indians
5	WK1	Jos Buttler	England	Wicketkeeper	24	Capped	150	Rajasthan Royals	440	Mumbai Indians	Mumbai Indians
6	FA1	Mustafizur Rahman	Bangladesh	Bowler	17	Capped	100	Mumbai Indians	220	Sunrisers Hyderabad	Sunrisers Hyderabad
6	FA1	Pat Cummins	Australia	Bowler	16	Capped	200	Mumbai Indians	540	Delhi Daredevils	Kolkata Knight Riders, Delhi Daredevils
6	FA1	Umesh Yadav	India	Bowler	94	Capped	100	Royal Challengers Bangalore	420	Kolkata Knight Riders	Kolkata Knight Riders, Delhi Daredevils
6	FA1	Mohammed Shami	India	Bowler	39	Capped	100	Delhi Daredevils^{[RTM]}	300	Delhi Daredevils	Delhi Daredevils, Kolkata Knight Riders
6	FA1	Kagiso Rabada	South Africa	Bowler	6	Capped	150	Delhi Daredevils^{[RTM]}	420	Delhi Daredevils	Delhi Daredevils
7	SP1	Piyush Chawla	India	Bowler	129	Capped	100	Kolkata Knight Riders ^{[RTM]}	420	Kolkata Knight Riders	Kolkata Knight Riders, Kings XI Punjab
7	SP1	Imran Tahir	South Africa	Bowler	32	Capped	100	Chennai Super Kings	100	Rising Pune Supergiant	Delhi Daredevils, Rising Pune Supergiant
7	SP1	Karn Sharma	India	Bowler	56	Capped	200	Chennai Super Kings	500	Mumbai Indians	Sunrisers Hyderabad, Mumbai Indians, Royal Challengers Bangalore
7	SP1	Rashid Khan	Afghanistan	Bowler	14	Capped	200	Sunrisers Hyderabad^{[RTM]}	900	Sunrisers Hyderabad	Sunrisers Hyderabad
7	SP1	Amit Mishra	India	Bowler	126	Capped	150	Delhi Daredevils	400	Delhi Daredevils	Delhi Daredevils, Deccan Chargers, Sunrisers Hyderabad
7	SP1	Yuzvendra Chahal	India	Bowler	56	Capped	200	Royal Challengers Bangalore ^{[RTM]}	600	Royal Challengers Bangalore	Royal Challengers Bangalore, Mumbai Indians
7	SP1	Kuldeep Yadav	India	Bowler	15	Capped	150	Kolkata Knight Riders ^{[RTM]}	580	Kolkata Knight Riders	Kolkata Knight Riders, Mumbai Indians
8	UBA1	Suryakumar Yadav	India	Batsman	55	Uncapped	30	Mumbai Indians	320	Kolkata Knight Riders	Kolkata Knight Riders, Mumbai Indians
8	UBA1	Shubman Gill	India	Batsman		Uncapped	20	Kolkata Knight Riders	180		
8	UBA1	Ishank Jaggi	India	Batsman	7	Uncapped	20	Kolkata Knight Riders	20	Kolkata Knight Riders	Deccan Chargers, Royal Challengers Bangalore, Kolkata Knight Riders
8	UBA1	Ricky Bhui	India	Batsman	0	Uncapped	20	Sunrisers Hyderabad	20	Sunrisers Hyderabad*	Sunrisers Hyderabad
8	UBA1	Mayank Agarwal	India	Batsman	53	Uncapped	20	Kings XI Punjab	100	Rising Pune Supergiant	Delhi Daredevils, Royal Challengers Bangalore, Rising Pune Supergiant
8	UBA1	Rahul Tripathi	India	Batsman	14	Uncapped	20	Rajasthan Royals	340	Rising Pune Supergiant	Rising Pune Supergiant
8	UBA1	Manan Vohra	India	Batsman	45	Uncapped	20	Royal Challengers Bangalore	110	Kings XI Punjab	Kings XI Punjab
8	UBA1	Prithvi Shaw	India	Batsman		Uncapped	20	Delhi Daredevils	120		
9	UAL1	Rahul Tewatia	India	All-Rounder	7	Uncapped	20	Delhi Daredevils	300	Kings XI Punjab	Kings XI Punjab, Rajasthan Royals
9	UAL1	Deepak Hooda	India	All-Rounder	41	Uncapped	40	Sunrisers Hyderabad^{[RTM]}	360	Sunrisers Hyderabad	Sunrisers Hyderabad, Rajasthan Royals
9	UAL1	Vijay Shankar	India	All-Rounder	5	Uncapped	40	Delhi Daredevils	320	Sunrisers Hyderabad	Sunrisers Hyderabad, Chennai Super Kings
9	UAL1	Harshal Patel	India	All-Rounder	36	Uncapped	20	Delhi Daredevils	20	Royal Challengers Bangalore	Mumbai Indians, Royal Challengers Bangalore
9	UAL1	Kamlesh Nagarkoti	India	All-Rounder		Uncapped	20	Kolkata Knight Riders	320		
9	UAL1	Krunal Pandya	India	All-Rounder	37	Uncapped	40	Mumbai Indians^{[RTM]}	880	Mumbai Indians	Mumbai Indians
9	UAL1	Nitish Rana	India	All-Rounder	17	Uncapped	20	Kolkata Knight Riders	340	Mumbai Indians	Mumbai Indians
9	UAL1	D'Arcy Short	Australia	All-Rounder		Uncapped	20	Rajasthan Royals	400		
9	UAL1	Jofra Archer	Barbados	All-Rounder		Uncapped	40	Rajasthan Royals	720		
10	UWK1	Ishan Kishan	India	Wicketkeeper	16	Uncapped	40	Mumbai Indians	620	Gujarat Lions	Gujarat Lions
11	UFA1	Kulwant Khejroliya	India	Bowler	0	Uncapped	20	Royal Challengers Bangalore	85	Mumbai Indians*	Mumbai Indians
11	UFA1	Siddharth Kaul	India	Bowler	21	Uncapped	30	Sunrisers Hyderabad	380	Sunrisers Hyderabad	Sunrisers Hyderabad, Delhi Daredevils, Kolkata Knight Riders
11	UFA1	T Natarajan	India	Bowler	6	Uncapped	40	Sunrisers Hyderabad	40	Kings XI Punjab	Kings XI Punjab
11	UFA1	Basil Thampi	India	Bowler	12	Uncapped	30	Sunrisers Hyderabad	95	Gujarat Lions	Gujarat Lions
11	UFA1	Aniket Choudhary	India	Bowler	5	Uncapped	30	Royal Challengers Bangalore	30	Royal Challengers Bangalore	Royal Challengers Bangalore
11	UFA1	Khaleel Ahmed	India	Bowler	0	Uncapped	20	Sunrisers Hyderabad	300	Delhi Daredevils*	Delhi Daredevils
11	UFA1	Navdeep Saini	India	Bowler	0	Uncapped	20	Royal Challengers Bangalore	300	Delhi Daredevils*	Delhi Daredevils
11	UFA1	Avesh Khan	India	Bowler	1	Uncapped	20	Delhi Daredevils	70	Royal Challengers Bangalore	Royal Challengers Bangalore
11	UFA1	Ankit Rajpoot	India	Bowler	11	Uncapped	30	Kings XI Punjab	300	Kolkata Knight Riders	Kolkata Knight Riders, Chennai Super Kings
12	USP1	Rahul Chahar	India	Bowler	3	Uncapped	20	Mumbai Indians	190	Rising Pune Supergiant	Rising Pune Supergiant
12	USP1	Shahbaz Nadeem	India	Bowler	55	Uncapped	40	Delhi Daredevils	320	Delhi Daredevils	Delhi Daredevils
12	USP1	Krishnappa Gowtham	India	Bowler	0	Uncapped	20	Rajasthan Royals	620	Mumbai Indians*	Mumbai Indians
12	USP1	Murugan Ashwin	India	Bowler	10	Uncapped	20	Royal Challengers Bangalore	220	Delhi Daredevils*	Delhi Daredevils, Rising Pune Supergiant
13	BA2	Evin Lewis	Trinidad and Tobago	Batsman		Capped	150	Mumbai Indians	380		
13	BA2	Saurabh Tiwary	India	Batsman	81	Capped	50	Mumbai Indians	80	Mumbai Indians	Rising Pune Supergiant, Delhi Daredevils, Mumbai Indians, Royal Challengers Bangalore
13	BA2	Mandeep Singh	India	Batsman	70	Capped	50	Royal Challengers Bangalore	140	Royal Challengers Bangalore	Royal Challengers Bangalore, Kings XI Punjab, Kolkata Knight Riders
13	BA2	Manoj Tiwary	India	Batsman	93	Capped	50	Kings XI Punjab	100	Rising Pune Supergiant	Rising Pune Supergiant, Kolkata Knight Riders, Delhi Daredevils
14	AL2	Washington Sundar	India	All-Rounder	11	Capped	150	Royal Challengers Bangalore	320	Rising Pune Supergiant	Rising Pune Supergiant
14	AL2	Pawan Negi	India	All-Rounder	41	Capped	50	Royal Challengers Bangalore ^{[RTM]}	100	Royal Challengers Bangalore	Delhi Daredevils, Chennai Super Kings, Royal Challengers Bangalore
14	AL2	Daniel Christian	Australia	All-Rounder	36	Capped	100	Delhi Daredevils	150	Rising Pune Supergiant	Royal Challengers Bangalore, Deccan Chargers, Rising Pune Supergiant
14	AL2	Jayant Yadav	India	All-Rounder	10	Capped	50	Delhi Daredevils	50	Delhi Daredevils	Delhi Daredevils
14	AL2	Gurkeerat Singh	India	All-Rounder	30	Capped	50	Delhi Daredevils	75	Kings XI Punjab	Kings XI Punjab
14	AL2	Ben Cutting	Australia	All-Rounder	9	Capped	100	Mumbai Indians	220	Sunrisers Hyderabad	Sunrisers Hyderabad, Rajasthan Royals, Kings XI Punjab
14	AL2	Mohammad Nabi	Afghanistan	All-Rounder	3	Capped	50	Sunrisers Hyderabad	100	Sunrisers Hyderabad	Sunrisers Hyderabad
15	FA2	Dhawal Kulkarni	India	Bowler	72	Capped	50	Rajasthan Royals^{[RTM]}	75	Gujarat Lions	Gujarat Lions, Mumbai Indians, Rajasthan Royals
15	FA2	Mohit Sharma	India	Bowler	75	Capped	150	Kings XI Punjab^{[RTM]}	240	Kings XI Punjab	Kings XI Punjab, Chennai Super Kings
15	FA2	Sandeep Sharma	India	Bowler	56	Capped	50	Sunrisers Hyderabad	300	Kings XI Punjab	Kings XI Punjab
15	FA2	Vinay Kumar	India	Bowler	103	Capped	100	Kolkata Knight Riders	100	Mumbai Indians	Mumbai Indians, Kolkata Knight Riders, Royal Challengers Bangalore, Kochi Tuskers Kerala
15	FA2	Mohammed Siraj	India	Bowler	6	Capped	100	Royal Challengers Bangalore	260	Sunrisers Hyderabad	Sunrisers Hyderabad
15	FA2	Nathan Coulter-Nile	Australia	Bowler	26	Capped	150	Royal Challengers Bangalore	220	Kolkata Knight Riders	Delhi Daredevils, Kolkata Knight Riders, Mumbai Indians
15	FA2	Jaydev Unadkat	India	Bowler	47	Capped	150	Rajasthan Royals	1150	Rising Pune Supergiant	Kolkata Knight Riders, Delhi Daredevils, Royal Challengers Bangalore, Rising Pune Supergiant
15	FA2	Trent Boult	New Zealand	Bowler	14	Capped	150	Delhi Daredevils	220	Kolkata Knight Riders	Sunrisers Hyderabad, Kolkata Knight Riders
15	FA2	Shardul Thakur	India	Bowler	13	Capped	75	Chennai Super Kings	260	Rising Pune Supergiant	Kings XI Punjab, Rising Pune Supergiant
16	SP2	Mujeeb Zadran	Afghanistan	Bowler		Capped	50	Kings XI Punjab	400		
17	UBA2	Apoorv Wankhade	India	Batsman	0	Uncapped	20	Kolkata Knight Riders	20		Mumbai Indians
17	UBA2	Rinku Singh	India	Batsman	0	Uncapped	20	Kolkata Knight Riders	80	Kings XI Punjab*	Kings XI Punjab
17	UBA2	Sachin Baby	India	Batsman	18	Uncapped	20	Sunrisers Hyderabad	20	Royal Challengers Bangalore	Royal Challengers Bangalore, Rajasthan Royals
17	UBA2	Manjot Kalra	India	Batsman		Uncapped	20	Delhi Daredevils	20		
18	UAL2	Ankit Sharma	India	All-Rounder	21	Uncapped	20	Rajasthan Royals	20	Rising Pune Supergiant	Rising Pune Supergiant, Deccan Chargers, Rajasthan Royals, Sunrisers Hyderabad
18	UAL2	Shivam Mavi	India	All-Rounder		Uncapped	20	Kolkata Knight Riders	300		
18	UAL2	Abhishek Sharma^{[1]}	India	All-Rounder		Uncapped	20	Delhi Daredevils	55		
19	UFA2	Pradeep Sangwan	India	Bowler	35	Uncapped	30	Mumbai Indians	150	Gujarat Lions	Gujarat Lions, Delhi Daredevils, Kolkata Knight Riders
19	UFA2	Anureet Singh	India	Bowler	20	Uncapped	30	Rajasthan Royals	30	Kings XI Punjab	Kings XI Punjab, Kolkata Knight Riders
21	UWK2	Narayan Jagadeesan	India	Wicketkeeper		Uncapped	20	Chennai Super Kings	20		
22	USP2	Zahir Khan Pakteen	Afghanistan	Bowler		Uncapped	20	Rajasthan Royals	60		
24	AL3	Jean-Paul Duminy	South Africa	All-Rounder	77	Capped	100	Mumbai Indians	100	Delhi Daredevils*	Delhi Daredevils, Deccan Chargers, Mumbai Indians
24	AL3	Chris Jordan	England	All-Rounder	10	Capped	100	Sunrisers Hyderabad	100	Sunrisers Hyderabad	Royal Challengers Bangalore, Sunrisers Hyderabad
24	AL3	Mitchell Santner	New Zealand	All-Rounder		Capped	50	Chennai Super Kings	50		
26	FA3	Jason Behrendorff	Australia	Bowler		Capped	100	Mumbai Indians	150		
26	FA3	Barinder Sran	India	Bowler	16	Capped	50	Kings XI Punjab	220	Sunrisers Hyderabad	Rajasthan Royals, Sunrisers Hyderabad
26	FA3	Billy Stanlake	Australia	Bowler	2	Capped	50	Sunrisers Hyderabad	50	Royal Challengers Bangalore	Royal Challengers Bangalore
26	FA3	Andrew Tye	Australia	Bowler	6	Capped	100	Kings XI Punjab	720	Gujarat Lions	Gujarat Lions, Chennai Super Kings
28	UBA3	Tanmay Agarwal	India	Batsman	0	Uncapped	20	Sunrisers Hyderabad	20	Sunrisers Hyderabad*	Sunrisers Hyderabad
29	UAL3	Deepak Chahar	India	All-Rounder	5	Uncapped	20	Chennai Super Kings	80	Rising Pune Supergiant	Rising Pune Supergiant
29	UAL3	Cameron Delport	South Africa	All-Rounder		Uncapped	30	Kolkata Knight Riders	30		
29	UAL3	Tajinder Singh	India	All-Rounder		Uncapped	20	Mumbai Indians	55		
29	UAL3	Shreyas Gopal	India	All-Rounder	6	Uncapped	20	Rajasthan Royals	20	Mumbai Indians	Mumbai Indians
29	UAL3	Akshdeep Nath	India	All-Rounder	5	Uncapped	20	Kings XI Punjab	100	Gujarat Lions	Gujarat Lions
30	UWK3	Shreevats Goswami	India	Wicketkeeper	23	Uncapped	20	Sunrisers Hyderabad	100		Rajasthan Royals, Kolkata Knight Riders, Royal Challengers Bangalore
31	UFA3	Ben Dwarshuis	Australia	Bowler		Uncapped	20	Kings XI Punjab	140		
31	UFA3	KM Asif	India	Bowler		Uncapped	20	Chennai Super Kings	40		
32	USP3	Sandeep Lamichhane	Nepal	Bowler		Associate	20	Delhi Daredevils	20		
35	FA4	Lungisani Ngidi	South Africa	Bowler		Capped	50	Chennai Super Kings	50		
36	UBA4	Sharad Lumba	India	Batsman		Uncapped	20	Mumbai Indians	20		
37	UAL4	Kanishk Seth	India	All-Rounder		Uncapped	20	Chennai Super Kings	20		
37	UAL4	Dhruv Shorey	India	All-Rounder		Uncapped	20	Chennai Super Kings	20		
57	UAL9	Aniruddha Joshi	India	All-Rounder		Uncapped	20	Royal Challengers Bangalore	20		
58	UAL10	Sudhesan Midhun	India	All-Rounder		Uncapped	20	Rajasthan Royals	20		
3	BA1	Murali Vijay^{[REC-1]}	India	Batsman	100	Capped	200	Chennai Super Kings	200	Kings XI Punjab*	Kings XI Punjab, Chennai Super Kings, Delhi Daredevils
5	WK1	Sam Billings^{[REC-1]}	England	Wicketkeeper	11	Capped	100	Chennai Super Kings	100	Delhi Daredevils	Delhi Daredevils
5	WK1	Naman Ojha^{[REC-1]}	India	Wicketkeeper	112	Capped	75	Delhi Daredevils	140	Sunrisers Hyderabad	Sunrisers Hyderabad, Delhi Daredevils, Rajasthan Royals
5	WK1	Parthiv Patel^{[REC-1]}	India	Wicketkeeper	119	Capped	100	Royal Challengers Bangalore	170	Mumbai Indians	Mumbai Indians, Chennai Super Kings, Deccan Chargers, Royal Challengers Bangalore, Kochi Tuskers Kerala, Sunrisers Hyderabad
6	FA1	Mitchell Johnson^{[REC-1]}	Australia	Bowler	48	Capped	200	Kolkata Knight Riders	200	Mumbai Indians	Kings XI Punjab, Mumbai Indians
6	FA1	Tim Southee^{[REC-1]}	New Zealand	Bowler	29	Capped	100	Royal Challengers Bangalore	100	Mumbai Indians	Mumbai Indians, Chennai Super Kings, Rajasthan Royals
8	UBA1	Siddhesh Lad^{[REC-1]}	India	Batsman	0	Uncapped	20	Mumbai Indians	20	Mumbai Indians*	Mumbai Indians
10	UWK1	Prashant Chopra^{[REC-1]}	India	Wicketkeeper		Uncapped	20	Rajasthan Royals	20		
10	UWK1	Aditya Tare^{[REC-1]}	India	Wicketkeeper	35	Uncapped	20	Mumbai Indians	20	Delhi Daredevils	Sunrisers Hyderabad, Delhi Daredevils, Mumbai Indians
18	UAL2	Bipul Sharma^{[REC-1]}	India	All-Rounder	33	Uncapped	20	Sunrisers Hyderabad	20	Sunrisers Hyderabad	Sunrisers Hyderabad, Kings XI Punjab
19	UFA2	Sayan Ghosh^{[REC-1]}	India	Bowler	0	Uncapped	20	Delhi Daredevils	20	Kolkata Knight Riders*	Kolkata Knight Riders
22	USP2	Mayank Markande^{[REC-1]}	India	Bowler		Uncapped	20	Mumbai Indians	20		
26	FA3	Ben Laughlin^{[REC-1]}	Australia	Bowler	2	Capped	50	Rajasthan Royals	50	Sunrisers Hyderabad*	Chennai Super Kings, Sunrisers Hyderabad
27	SP3	Akila Dananjaya^{[DI-REC-1]}	Sri Lanka	Bowler		Capped	50	Mumbai Indians	50		Chennai Super Kings
32	USP3	Pardeep Sahu^{[DI-REC-1]}	India	Bowler	5	Uncapped	20	Kings XI Punjab	20	Kings XI Punjab*	Kings XI Punjab, Rajasthan Royals
37	UAL4	Mayank Dagar^{[REC-1]}	India	All-Rounder		Uncapped	20	Kings XI Punjab	20		
37	UAL4	Anukul Roy^{[REC-1]}	India	All-Rounder		Uncapped	20	Mumbai Indians	20		
42	FA5	Mark Wood^{[REC-1]}	England	Bowler		Capped	150	Chennai Super Kings	150		
44	UAL5	Mahipal Lomror^{[DI-REC-1]}	India	All-Rounder		Uncapped	20	Rajasthan Royals	20		Delhi Daredevils
45	UFA5	Mohsin Khan^{[DI-REC-1]}	India	Bowler		Uncapped	20	Mumbai Indians	20		
49	UAL6	Mehdi Hasan^{[REC-1]}	India	All-Rounder		Uncapped	20	Sunrisers Hyderabad	20		
49	UAL6	Kshitiz Sharma^{[REC-1]}	India	All-Rounder		Uncapped	20	Chennai Super Kings	20		
54	UFA7	Monu Kumar^{[REC-1]}	India	Bowler		Uncapped	20	Chennai Super Kings	20		
55	UAL8	Chaitanya Bishnoi^{[DI-REC-1]}	India	All-Rounder		Uncapped	20	Chennai Super Kings	20		
59	UAL11	Jatin Saxena^{[DI-REC-1]}	India	All-Rounder		Uncapped	20	Rajasthan Royals	20		
61	UAL13	Aryaman Birla^{[REC-1]}	India	All-Rounder		Uncapped	20	Rajasthan Royals	30		
61	UAL13	Pavan Deshpande^{[DI-REC-1]}	India	All-Rounder		Uncapped	20	Royal Challengers Bangalore	20		
1	M1	Chris Gayle^{[REC-1&2]}	Jamaica	Batsman	101	Capped	200	Kings XI Punjab	200	Royal Challengers Bangalore	Royal Challengers Bangalore, Kolkata Knight Riders
47	FA6	Dushmantha Chameera^{[REC-1&2]}	Sri Lanka	Bowler		Capped	50	Rajasthan Royals	50		
50	UFA6	M. D. Nidheesh^{[DI-REC-1&2]}	India	Bowler		Uncapped	20	Mumbai Indians	20		
57	UAL9	Manzoor Dar^{[DI-REC-2]}	India	All-Rounder		Uncapped	20	Kings XI Punjab	20		
59	UAL11	Javon Searles^{[DI-REC-2]}	Barbados	All-Rounder		Uncapped	30	Kolkata Knight Riders	30		

Source:Vivo IPL 2018 Player Auction

Key to sets

- BA: Batsman
- FA: Fast bowler
- SP: Spin bowler
- AL: All-rounder
- M: Marquee player
- U: Uncapped player

^{RTM} RTM: Players bought using Rights to Match Card.
^{REC} REC-1/2/1&2: Players unsold originally in their sets but brought back for Recall Round-1 or 2 or both.
^{DI-REC} DI-REC-1/2/1&2: Players not called in accelerated process but were brought back for Recall Round-1 or 2 or both..
^{1} Note 1: Abhishek Sharma was wrongly categorized in the Set-10-UWK1 in the shortlist was corrected in the auction.
* : Players were in the squad for the season but did not play any match.
0 : Players mentioned as 0 in IPL matches column were part of the squad but did not play any matches.

== Withdrawn players ==
The following players withdrew from the tournament either due to injuries or because of other reasons. Players were signed as replacement of contracted players who were not available to play due to injuries and national commitments. Under IPL rules, the replacements have to be chosen from the pool of players who went unsold in the auction, and cannot be paid more than the players they are replacing, though they can be paid less.

Player	Team	Auctioned/Retention Price (in ₹ Lacs)	Reason	Announcement date	Replacement Player	Replacement Player's Price (in ₹ Lacs)	Replacement Player's Base Price (in ₹ Lacs)	Signing date	Ref
Mitchell Santner	Chennai Super Kings	50	Bone Defect in Knee	14 March 2018			109	22 March 2018	
Jason Behrendorff	Mumbai Indians	150	Back problem	19 March 2018	Mitchell McClenaghan	100	100	19 March 2018	
Nathan Coulter-Nile	Royal Challengers Bangalore	220	Injury	24 March 2018	Corey Anderson	200	200	24 March 2018	
David Warner	Sunrisers Hyderabad	1200	Ban due to Ball tampering by IPL	28 March 2018	Alex Hales	100	100	31 March 2018	
Steve Smith	Rajasthan Royals	1200	Ban due to Ball tampering by IPL	28 March 2018	Heinrich Klaasen	50	50	2 April 2018	
Mitchell Starc	Kolkata Knight Riders	940	Tibial Bone Stress in his Right Leg	30 March 2018	Tom Curran	100	100	2 April 2018	
Kagiso Rabada	Delhi Daredevils	420	Lower-back Stress Reaction	5 April 2018	Liam Plunkett	200	200	7 April 2018	
Kedar Jadhav	Chennai Super Kings	780	Hamstring Injury	9 April 2018		200	200	11 April 2018	
Pat Cummins	Mumbai Indians	540	Back Injury	10 April 2018	Adam Milne	75	75	14 April 2018	
Zahir Khan Pakteen	Rajasthan Royals	60	Injury	10 April 2018	Ish Sodhi	50	50	10 April 2018	
Kamlesh Nagarkoti	Kolkata Knight Riders	320	Foot Injury	14 April 2018	Prasidh Krishna	20	20	14 April 2018	
Billy Stanlake	Sunrisers Hyderabad	50	Fractured Finger	24 April 2018					
Chris Morris	Delhi Daredevils	710	Back Injury	27 April 2018	Junior Dala	20	20	27 April 2018	
Mark Wood	Chennai Super Kings	150	Returned to England	8 May 2018	David Willey				

== Support staff changes ==
Staff	Team	Change	Role	Announcement date	Note	Ref
Rahul Dravid	Delhi Daredevils	Stepped down	Mentor	30 June 2017	Got a two-year extension on his role as the head coach of India A and India Under-19s.	
Paddy Upton	Delhi Daredevils	Parted ways	Head coach	16 November 2017	Moved to Rajasthan Royals as head coach.	
Zubin Bharucha	Delhi Daredevils	Parted ways	Technical director	16 November 2017	Moved to Rajasthan Royals as Head of Cricket	
T. A. Sekhar	Delhi Daredevils	Resigned	Director	16 November 2017	Cited "Personal reasons".	
Jonty Rhodes	Mumbai Indians	Stepped down	Fielding Coach	7 December 2017	Focus on personal business	
James Pamment	Mumbai Indians	Appointed	Fielding Coach	7 December 2017	Replacement for Jonty Rhodes	
Brad Hodge	Kings XI Punjab	Appointed	Head coach	13 December 2017		
Gary Kirsten	Royal Challengers Bangalore	Appointed	Batting Coach	2 January 2018		
Ashish Nehra	Royal Challengers Bangalore	Appointed	Bowling Coach	2 January 2018		
Ricky Ponting	Delhi Daredevils	Appointed	Head coach	4 January 2018		
Michael Hussey	Chennai Super Kings	Appointed	Batting Coach	6 January 2018		
Stephen Fleming	Chennai Super Kings	Appointed	Head coach	19 January 2018		
Lakshmipathy Balaji	Chennai Super Kings	Appointed	Bowling Coach	19 January 2018	Left Kolkata Knight Riders as Bowling Coach.	
Zubin Bharucha	Rajasthan Royals	Appointed	Head of Cricket	19 January 2018	Left Post of Technical Director from Delhi Daredevils.	
James Hopes	Delhi Daredevils	Appointed	Bowling Coach	29 January 2018		
Sunil Valson	Delhi Daredevils	Appointed	Manager	29 January 2018		
Subhadeep Ghosh	Delhi Daredevils	Appointed	Fielding Coach	29 January 2018		
Pravin Amre	Delhi Daredevils	Appointed	Head of Talent	2 February 2018		
Lasith Malinga	Mumbai Indians	Appointed	Bowling Mentor	7 February 2018		
Shane Warne	Rajasthan Royals	Appointed	Mentor	13 February 2018		
Eric Simons	Chennai Super Kings	Appointed	Bowling Consultant	14 February 2018		
Sairaj Bahutule	Rajasthan Royals	Appointed	Spin Bowling Coach	27 February 2018		
Venkatesh Prasad	Kings XI Punjab	Appointed	Bowling Coach	4 March 2018		
Nishanta Bordoloi	Kings XI Punjab	Appointed	Fielding Coach	4 March 2018		
Shayamal Vallabhjee	Kings XI Punjab	Appointed	Technical coach	4 March 2018		
Heath Streak	Kolkata Knight Riders	Appointed	Bowling Coach	10 March 2018	Replaced Balaji, who joined Chennai Super Kings as bowling coach.	
Amol Muzumdar	Rajasthan Royals	Appointed	Batting Coach	13 March 2018		
Rajiv Kumar	Chennai Super Kings	Appointed	Fielding Coach	27 March 2018		
Dishant Yagnik	Rajasthan Royals	Appointed	Fielding Coach	29 March 2018		
Paddy Upton	Rajasthan Royals	Appointed	Head coach	2 Apr 2018	Left Delhi Daredevils as head coach.	
Abhishek Nayar	Kolkata Knight Riders	Appointed	Mentor	14 Apr 2018		
