= Abhishek Das =

Abhishek Das may refer to:

- Abhishek Das (footballer)
- Abhishek Das (cricketer)
