= Kanwar Abhinay =

Indian cricketer (born 1991)

Personal information
- Full name: Kanwar Abhinay Singh
- Born: 16 June 1991 (age 35); Hamirpur, Himachal Pradesh, India
- Batting: Right-handed
- Bowling: Right-arm fast-medium
- Role: Bowler

Domestic team information
- Years: Team
- 2012/13: Himachal Pradesh
- Source: ESPNcricinfo, 30 November 2016

Kanwar Abhinay (born 16 June 1991) is an Indian cricketer. He made his first-class debut for Himachal Pradesh in the 2012–13 Ranji Trophy on 1 December 2012. He made his List A debut for Himachal Pradesh in the 2016–17 Vijay Hazare Trophy on 25 February 2017. He made his Twenty20 debut for Himachal Pradesh in the 2017–18 Zonal T20 League on 8 January 2018.
