= Jayveer Parmar =

Indian cricketer (born 1998)

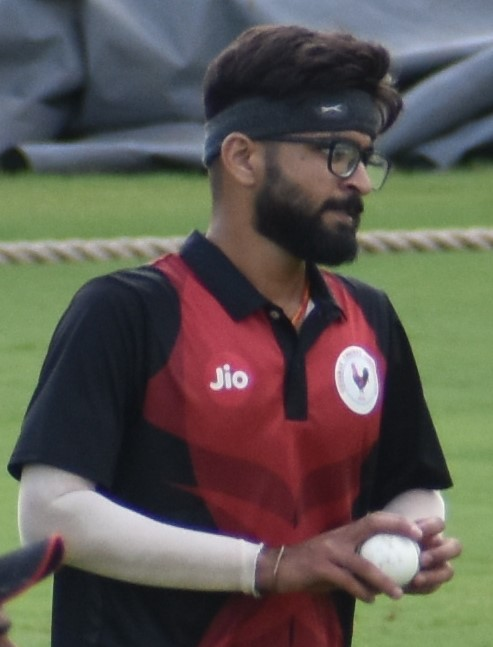
- Parmar during the 2019–20 Vijay Hazare Trophy

Personal information
- Full name: Jayveersingh Kanaksinh Parmar
- Born: 13 June 1998 (age 28); Ahmedabad, Gujarat, India
- Source: ESPNcricinfo, 8 January 2018

Jayveer Parmar (born 13 June 1998) is an Indian cricketer. He made his Twenty20 debut for Gujarat in the 2017–18 Zonal T20 League on 8 January 2018.
