= Khizer Dafedar =

Indian cricketer (born 1997)

Khizar Dafedar
Personal information
- Born: 10 October 1997 (age 29)
- Source: ESPNcricinfo, 10 January 2018

Khizar Dafedar (born 10 October 1997) is an Indian cricketer. He made his Twenty20 debut for Mumbai in the 2017–18 Zonal T20 League on 10 January 2018.
