= Rajesh Dhuper =

Indian cricketer (born 1999)

Personal information
- Full name: Rajesh Rajeev Dhuper
- Born: 2 December 1999 (age 26); Cuttack, Odisha, India
- Source: Cricinfo, 9 November 2017

Rajesh Dhuper (born 2 December 1999) is an Indian cricketer. He made his first-class debut for Odisha in the 2015–16 Ranji Trophy on 1 October 2015. He made his Twenty20 debut for Odisha in the 2017–18 Zonal T20 League on 8 January 2018.
