= Sekhar Barman =

Indian cricketer (born 1988)

Personal information
- Full name: Sekhar Jyoti Barman
- Born: 10 December 1988 (age 37); Maligaon, Assam, India
- Batting: Left-handed
- Bowling: Slow left-arm orthodox
- Role: Bowler

Domestic team information
- Years: Team
- 2018–present: Assam
- Source: Cricinfo, 8 January 2018

Sekhar Barman (born 10 December 1988) is an Indian cricketer. He made his Twenty20 debut for Assam in the 2017–18 Zonal T20 League on 8 January 2018.
