= Kulwant Khejroliya =

Indian cricketer (born 1992)

Personal information
- Born: 13 March 1992 (age 34); Jhunjhunu, Rajasthan, India
- Batting: Left-handed
- Bowling: Left-arm medium-fast
- Role: Bowler

Domestic team information
- Years: Team
- 2017–2022: Delhi
- 2018–2019: Royal Challengers Bangalore
- 2023–: Madhya Pradesh
- 2023: Kolkata Knight Riders
- 2025–2026: Gujarat Titans

Career statistics
Competition	FC	LA	T20
Matches	27	40	27
Runs scored	135	64	19
Batting average	7.10	7.11	–
100s/50s	0/0	0/0	0/0
Top score	21*	18*	18*
Balls bowled	4,490	1,844	535
Wickets	73	75	27
Bowling average	33.30	21.90	27.37
5 wickets in innings	1	2	0
10 wickets in match	0	–	–
Best bowling	5/34	6/31	4/26
Catches/stumpings	6/–	6/–	4/–
- Source: Cricinfo, 22 October 2026

Kulwant Khejroliya (born 13 March 1992) is an Indian cricketer. He made his List A debut for Delhi in the 2016–17 Vijay Hazare Trophy on 26 February 2017. Prior to his debut, he was bought by the Mumbai Indians team for the 2017 Indian Premier League for 10 lakhs.

He made his first-class debut for Delhi in the 2017–18 Ranji Trophy on 6 October 2017. He made his Twenty20 debut for Delhi in the 2017–18 Zonal T20 League on 9 January 2018. Later the same month, he was bought by the Royal Challengers Bangalore in the 2018 IPL auction.

In October 2018, in the quarter-finals of the 2018–19 Vijay Hazare Trophy, he took a hat-trick for Delhi against Haryana, finishing with figures of six wickets for 31 runs from his ten overs. He was released by the Royal Challengers Bangalore ahead of the 2020 IPL auction.

== Early life and background ==
Khejroliya was born on March 13, 1992, in Jhunjhunu, Rajasthan. Khejroliya is a branch of Shekhawat clan. His father Shankar Singh Khejroliya runs a grocery store and mother Saroj Kanwar is a housewife. He belongs to Ravana Rajputs community.
