= Prayash Singh =

Indian cricketer (born 1994)

Personal information
- Full name: Prayash Kumar Singh
- Born: 2 February 1994 (age 32); Nuapada, Odisha, India
- Source: Cricinfo, 6 March 2017

Prayash Singh (born 2 February 1994) is an Indian cricketer. He made his List A debut for Odisha in the 2016–17 Vijay Hazare Trophy on 6 March 2017. He made his Twenty20 debut for Odisha in the 2017–18 Zonal T20 League on 8 January 2018.
