= Harishankar Reddy =

Indian cricketer (born 1998)

Personal information
- Full name: Maramreddy Harishankar Reddy
- Born: 2 June 1998 (age 28); Rayachoti, Andhra Pradesh, India
- Batting: Right-handed
- Bowling: Right arm fast medium
- Source: ESPNcricinfo, 11 January 2018

Harishankar Reddy (born 2 June 1998) is an Indian cricketer. He made his Twenty20 debut for Andhra in the 2017–18 Zonal T20 League on 11 January 2018. In February 2021, Reddy was bought by the Chennai Super Kings in the IPL auction ahead of the 2021 Indian Premier League. He made his List A debut on 20 February 2021, for Andhra in the 2020–21 Vijay Hazare Trophy.
