= Yuvraj Chudasama =

Indian cricketer (born 1995)

Personal information
- Born: 23 November 1995 (age 30); Bhavnagar, Gujarat, India
- Batting: Left-handed
- Bowling: Legbreak
- Source: Cricinfo, 8 January 2018

Yuvraj Chudasama (born 23 November 1995) is an Indian cricketer. He made his Twenty20 debut for Saurashtra in the 2017–18 Zonal T20 League on 8 January 2018. He made his List A debut for Saurashtra in the 2018–19 Vijay Hazare Trophy on 23 September 2018. He made his first-class debut for Saurashtra in the 2018–19 Ranji Trophy on 28 November 2018.
