= Satender Thakran =

Indian cricketer (born 1993)

Personal information
- Born: 15 October 1993 (age 33)
- Batting: Right-handed
- Bowling: Right arm medium

Domestic team information
- Years: Team
- 2016–17: Railways
- Source: Cricinfo, 4 March 2017

Satender Thakran (born 15 October 1993) is an Indian cricketer. He made his List A debut for Railways in the 2016–17 Vijay Hazare Trophy on 4 March 2017. He made his Twenty20 debut for Railways in the 2017–18 Zonal T20 League on 9 January 2018.
