= Praveen Dubey =

Indian cricketer (born 1993)

Pravin Dubey
Personal information
- Born: 1 July 1993 (age 33); Azamgarh, Uttar Pradesh, India
- Batting: Right-handed
- Bowling: Leg break googly
- Role: All-rounder

Domestic team information
- Years: Team
- 2015/16–present: Karnataka
- 2020,2023: Delhi Capitals
- 2025–present: Punjab Kings

Career statistics
Competition	FC	LA	T20
Matches	1	19	27
Runs scored	46	200	153
Batting average	–	22.22	12.75
100s/50s	0/0	0/1	0/0
Top score	46*	65*	33
Balls bowled	96	934	447
Wickets	2	25	25
Bowling average	40.00	31.72	21.60
5 wickets in innings	0	0	0
10 wickets in match	0	–	–
Best bowling	2/80	4/29	4/19
Catches/stumpings	0/–	10/–	15/–
- Source: ESPNcricinfo, 24 May 2025

Praveen Dubey (born 1 July 1993) is an Indian cricketer who plays for Karnataka in domestic cricket. He is a right-handed batsman and leg break googly bowler. He was signed up by Royal Challengers Bangalore at the 2016 IPL players auction for ₹ 35 lakh. In February 2017, he was bought by the Royal Challengers Bangalore team for the 2017 Indian Premier League for ₹ 10 lakh. In 2020, the Delhi Capitals named him as a replacement for their injured player Amit Mishra.

He made his Twenty20 debut for Karnataka in the 2017–18 Zonal T20 League on 8 January 2018. He made his first-class debut on 11 January 2020, for Karnataka in the 2019–20 Ranji Trophy. named 27-year-old uncapped leg-spinner Pravin Dube as a replacement for Amit Mishra who was ruled out of IPL 2020 with a finger injury. In February 2022, he was bought by the Delhi Capitals in the auction for the 2022 Indian Premier League tournament.
