= Rohit Dhruw =

Indian cricketer (born 1982)

Personal information
- Born: 21 May 1982 (age 44)
- Source: Cricinfo, 28 February 2017

Rohit Dhruw (born 21 May 1982) is an Indian cricketer. He made his List A debut for Chhattisgarh in the 2016–17 Vijay Hazare Trophy on 28 February 2017. He made his Twenty20 debut for Chhattisgarh in the 2017–18 Zonal T20 League on 10 January 2018.
