= Shivendra Singh (cricketer) =

Indian cricketer (born 1991)

Personal information
- Born: 2 August 1991; Rewa, India
- Batting: Right-handed
- Source: ESPNcricinfo, 29 November 2016

Shivendra Singh (born 2 August 1991) is an Indian first-class cricketer who plays for Chhattisgarh. He made his first-class debut for Chhattisgarh in the 2016-17 Ranji Trophy on 29 November 2016. He made his Twenty20 debut for Chhattisgarh in the 2017–18 Zonal T20 League on 8 January 2018. He made his List A debut for Chhattisgarh in the 2017–18 Vijay Hazare Trophy on 5 February 2018.
