= Zubin Bharucha =

Indian former first-class cricketer

Personal information
- Full name: Zubin Minoo Bharucha
- Born: 8 January 1970 (age 56); Bombay, Maharashtra, India
- Batting: Right-handed
- Bowling: Right-arm medium
- Role: Opening batsman

Domestic team information
- Years: Team
- 1992/93–1995/96: Bombay
- 1995: Surrey CCC

Career statistics
Competition	FC	List A
Matches	17	11
Runs scored	1,021	189
Batting average	42.54	23.63
100s/50s	3/4	0/2
Top score	164*	72
Balls bowled	–	–
Wickets	–	–
Bowling average	–	–
5 wickets in innings	–	–
10 wickets in match	–	n/a
Best bowling	–	–
Catches/stumpings	7/–	6/–
- Source: ESPNcricinfo, 25 January 2016

Zubin Minoo Bharucha (born 8 January 1970) is an Indian former first-class cricketer who played for Bombay and Surrey County Cricket Club. He worked as team director for the Rajasthan Royals from 2008 to 2015, technical director for the Delhi Daredevils from 2016 to 2017, and as the Royals' director of cricket operations from 2018 to 2025/26, before becoming Director of Performance for the Mumbai Indians in August 2026.

== Life and career ==
A right-handed opening batsman, Bharucha first played as an overseas player for the Reigate Priory Cricket Club in England as an 18-year-old and represented the club for several years. He appeared in 17 first-class and 11 List A matches, playing for Bombay, and scored a hundred on his first-class debut in November 1992. He was part of the Bombay team in its 1993–94 Ranji Trophy victory. In the 1994–95 Irani Cup match for Bombay against Rest of India, Bharucha scored his career-best unbeaten 164 and helped his team win the trophy. He also represented India Youth XI and Surrey.

Bharucha runs the World Cricket Academy in Mumbai where many Test cricketers have trained. He helped Yuvraj Singh on his footwork in the late-2000s and worked with the England and Wales Cricket Board on technical aspects of the game.

In 2008, he became the team director of the Indian Premier League franchise Rajasthan Royals and continued in that position until the team's suspension in 2015. He also worked as the team's head coach in 2012. During his stint with the Royals, he made technical analysis of players based on video footage collected from around the world, and scouted for talented Indian cricketers. During the Royals' two-year suspension in 2016–17, he worked as technical director for the Delhi Daredevils (now Capitals). He returned to the Royals as Head of Cricket Operations in 2018.

As of May 2026, he had departed the Royals, while continuing to be linked to several Royals-associated players as a personal mentor and batting coach, including Sanju Samson, Dhruv Jurel, Yashasvi Jaiswal, and Vaibhav Sooryavanshi. He was appointed Director of Performance for the Mumbai Indians in August 2026, taking responsibility over player development for both their men's and women's teams.
