= Jagdish Zope =

Indian cricketer (born 1995)

Personal information
- Full name: Jagdish Purshottam Zope
- Born: 6 September 1995 (age 31); Jalgaon, Maharashtra, India
- Batting: Left-handed
- Bowling: Slow left-arm orthodox
- Source: ESPNcricinfo

Jagdish Zope (born 6 September 1995) is an Indian cricketer.

He made his Twenty20 debut for Maharashtra in the 2016–17 Inter State Twenty-20 Tournament on 29 January 2017. He made his List A debut for Maharashtra in the 2016–17 Vijay Hazare Trophy on 25 February 2017. He made his first-class debut for Maharashtra in the 2017–18 Ranji Trophy on 24 October 2017.
