= Manzoor Dar =

Indian cricketer (born 1993)

Personal information
- Full name: Manzoor Ahmad Dar
- Born: 1 November 1993 (age 32); Bandipora, India
- Batting: Right-handed
- Bowling: Right-arm offbreak
- Role: All-rounder

Domestic team information
- Years: Team
- 2017-2021: Jammu and Kashmir
- Source: ESPNcricinfo, 28 January 2018

Manzoor Ahmad Dar (born 1 November 1993) is an Indian former cricketer. He made his Twenty20 debut for Jammu and Kashmir in the 2016–17 Inter State Twenty-20 Tournament on 30 January 2017. He made his List A debut for Jammu & Kashmir in the 2016–17 Vijay Hazare Trophy on 25 February 2017. In January 2018, he was bought by the Kings XI Punjab in the 2018 IPL auction.

== Early life ==
Manzoor Dar was born in Bandipora Kashmir.He worked as a security guard at a Srinagar Automobile Showroom for over four years to support his family.
