= Apoorv Wankhade =

Indian cricketer (born 1992)

Personal information
- Full name: Apoorv Vijay Wankhade
- Born: 14 March 1992 (age 34); Amravati, Maharashtra, India
- Batting: Right handed
- Bowling: Right arm medium
- Role: Middle order batter

Domestic team information
- Years: Team
- 2011–2022: Vidarbha
- Source: ESPNcricinfo, 29 January 2017

Apoorv Wankhade (born 14 March 1992) is an Indian cricketer who plays for Vidarbha. He made his first-class debut for Vidarbha in the 2012–13 Ranji Trophy on 2 November 2012. In January 2018, he was bought by the Kolkata Knight Riders in the 2018 IPL auction. He had previously been bought by Mumbai Indians in the Indian Premier League.
