= Monu Kumar =

Indian cricketer (born 1994)

Personal information
- Full name: Monu Kumar Singh
- Born: 5 November 1994 (age 32); Ranchi, Jharkhand, India
- Batting: Right-handed
- Bowling: Right arm medium
- Role: Bowler

Domestic team information
- Years: Team
- 2013/14–present: Jharkhand
- 2020: Chennai Super Kings
- Source: ESPNcricinfo, 20 November 2016

Monu Kumar (born 5 November 1994) is an Indian cricketer. He made his Twenty20 debut for Jharkhand in the 2015–16 Syed Mushtaq Ali Trophy on 3 January 2016. Prior to his debut, he was part of India's squad for the 2014 Under-19 Cricket World Cup. In January 2018, he was bought by the Chennai Super Kings in the 2018 IPL auction. He made his debut for Chennai Super Kings on 25 October 2020 against Royal Challengers Bangalore. He bowled two overs, conceding 20 runs.
