= Shakeeb Ahmed =

Indian cricketer (born 1994)

Personal information
- Full name: Shakeeb Ahmed
- Born: 11 November 1994 (age 32); Bhilai, India
- Batting: Left-handed
- Bowling: Right-arm medium

Domestic team information
- Years: Team
- Chhattisgarh
- Source: ESPNcricinfo, 6 October 2017

Shakeeb Ahmed (born 11 November 1994) is an Indian cricketer. He made his first-class debut for Chhattisgarh in the 2016–17 Ranji Trophy on 6 October 2016. He made his Twenty20 debut for Chhattisgarh in the 2016–17 Inter State Twenty-20 Tournament on 29 January 2017. He made his List A debut for Chhattisgarh in the 2018–19 Vijay Hazare Trophy on 2 October 2018.
