= Vidyadhar Patil =

Indian cricketer (born 2000)

Personal information
- Full name: Vidyadhar Somashekhar Patil
- Born: 5 September 2000 (age 26); Raichur, Karnataka, India
- Batting: Right-handed
- Bowling: Right-arm medium
- Role: Bowler
- Source: Cricinfo, 4 November 2021

Vidyadhar Patil (born 5 September 2000) is an Indian cricketer. He made his Twenty20 debut on 4 November 2021, for Karnataka in the 2021–22 Syed Mushtaq Ali Trophy. Prior to his Twenty20 debut, he was named in India's squad for the 2020 Under-19 Cricket World Cup. He made his List A debut on 8 December 2021, for Karnataka in the 2021–22 Vijay Hazare Trophy. He made his first-class debut on 17 February 2022, for Karnataka in the 2021–22 Ranji Trophy.
