= Amit Mishra =

Indian cricketer (born 1982)

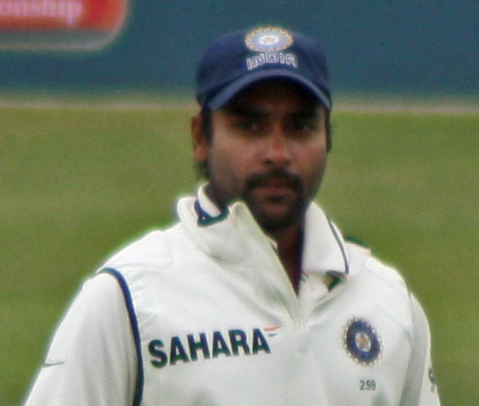

Personal information
- Born: 24 November 1982 (age 43); Delhi, India
- Nickname: Mishi
- Batting: Right-handed
- Bowling: Right-arm leg break
- Role: Bowler

International information
- National side: India (2003–2017)
- Test debut (cap 259): 17 October 2008 v Australia
- Last Test: 20 December 2016 v England
- ODI debut (cap 151): 13 April 2003 v South Africa
- Last ODI: 29 October 2016 v New Zealand
- ODI shirt no.: 99
- T20I debut (cap 33): 13 June 2010 v Zimbabwe
- Last T20I: 1 February 2017 v England
- T20I shirt no.: 99

Domestic team information
- Years: Team
- 2000/01–2023/24: Haryana
- 2008–2010: Delhi Daredevils (squad no. 99)
- 2008/09: Central Districts
- 2011–2012: Deccan Chargers (squad no. 99)
- 2013–2014: Sunrisers Hyderabad (squad no. 99)
- 2015–2021: Delhi Capitals
- 2023–2024: Lucknow Super Giants

Career statistics
Competition	Test	ODI	T20I	FC
Matches	22	36	10	152
Runs scored	648	2	0	4,176
Batting average	21.60	4.80	0.00	21.75
100s/50s	0/4	0/0	0/0	1/17
Top score	84	2	0	202*
Balls bowled	5,103	1,648	228	30,843
Wickets	76	64	16	535
Bowling average	35.72	23.60	15.00	29.17
5 wickets in innings	1	2	0	21
10 wickets in match	0	0	0	1
Best bowling	5/71	6/48	3/24	6/66
Catches/stumpings	8/–	2/–	1/–	77/–
Medal record
Men's Cricket
Representing India
ICC Champions Trophy
Winner	2013 England and Wales
ICC T20 World Cup
Runner-up	2014 Bangladesh
- Source: ESPNcricinfo, 4 October 2024

Amit Mishra (born 24 November 1982) is a former Indian cricketer. He is a right-arm leg-break bowler and right-handed tail-ender batsman. He plays for Haryana in the domestic Ranji Trophy and for the T20 franchise Lucknow Super Giants in the Indian Premier League. He has represented India in Test, ODIs and T20s. Mishra was a member of the Indian team that won the 2013 ICC Champions Trophy.

== International career ==
=== Test career ===
Mishra was initially called into the Indian squad for a Test against the West Indies in 2002, but was not selected. Mishra made his Test cricket debut against Australia in the Second Test at Mohali (PCA stadium) after captain and first-choice leg spinner Anil Kumble was injured. He took 5 wickets for 71 runs in Australia's first innings and then 2/35 in the second, making him the leading wicket-taker in the match as India proceeded to a decisive victory. Despite this, Indian coach Gary Kirsten said that Mishra would be dropped if Kumble recovered for the Third Test. However, Harbhajan Singh was injured so Mishra retained his place when Kumble came in. Kumble was then injured during the Test and retired, leaving Mishra as India's first-choice Test leg spinner.

Mishra was selected for the early-2009 Test tour of New Zealand, but India opted to field only one spinner, and he watched as Harbhajan performed the spin duties alone. India's next Test was not until November 2009. Mishra took only one wicket in the high-scoring drawn First Test and was dropped for the Second Test in favour of left arm orthodox spinner Pragyan Ojha, who retained his position for the Third Test as the second spinner.

Mishra was recalled for the tour of Bangladesh and played in the First Test in Chittagong as the only spinner after Harbhajan suffered an injury. He made 50 in the second innings as a night-watchman and took seven wickets. However, he was once again dropped in the next Test for Ojha.

Later in the India's tour of England in 2011 he got his highest score ever in the last test match of 84. Mishra was included in the squad for India's 2016 tour of West Indies. He played two tests and picked up six wickets.

== Limited over career ==
Mishra made his One Day International (ODI) debut against South Africa during the TVS Cup in 2003. Mishra played in the 2009 ICC Champions Trophy in South Africa.

At the start of the Bangladesh tour, Mishra played in two ODIs against Sri Lanka and Bangladesh in a triangular tournament after Harbhajan was rested for the final two round-robin matches. He has been recalled for one day series against Zimbabwe July 2013. He won man of the match award for his 4/47 bowling against Zimbabwe in 3rd ODI played on 28 July 2013.

Mishra managed to get most wickets by any bowler in a 5-match series or tournament against Zimbabwe July 2013. The spinner also equalled Indian bowling great Javagal Srinath's world record for the most wickets in a bilateral ODI series with 18 wickets. Srinath managed his feat in 7 matches so Mishra equaled the record in fewer matches.

Mishra was selected in the 2nd XI of the 2014 ICC World T20 Cup by ESPNcricinfo.

Mishra was included in the squad for India's 2016 tour of West Indies. He took three wickets in one of the two T20I games, taking his career-best 3/24 in it. In New Zealand's 2016–17 tour of India, he was included in the ODI side. He took 15 wickets in the five games, which included 5/18 in the final game that helped India win the series 3–2, and was awarded the Player of the Series.

He was the leading wicket-taker for Haryana in the 2018–19 Vijay Hazare Trophy, with sixteen dismissals in nine matches.

== IPL career ==
On 17 April 2013 in season 6 of Indian Premier League (IPL 2013) he took a hat-trick playing for Sunrisers Hyderabad against Pune Warriors India and with this hat-trick, he became the first player in IPL history to take three hat-tricks. He has previously taken hat-trick in IPL 2008 playing for Delhi Daredevils against Deccan Chargers and then again in IPL 2011 playing for Deccan Chargers against Kings XI Punjab. For his performances in 2013, he was named in the ESPNcricinfo IPL XI.

Mishra suffered a finger injury during DC's win over KKR in Sharjah. Mishra bowled only 2 overs before walking off the field. Mishra has now dismissed Rohit Sharma the most number of times in IPL Mishra equaled Zaheer and Sandeep's record for dismissing a batsman most number of times in IPL.

He played for Delhi Daredevils in IPL 2015, IPL 2016, and IPL 2017. In January 2018, he was bought by the Delhi Daredevils in the 2018 IPL auction. He was retained in 2019 IPL. In the 2020 IPL, Mishra started well, taking 3 wickets at an economy rate of 7.20, before a finger injury ended his tournament.

Mishra is the seventh highest wicket taker in Indian Premier League history.

Mishra returned to Delhi Capitals as a spin bowling coach ahead of IPL 2027.

== 2015 Sexual Assault Allegations ==
In 2015, Mishra was accused and later arrested as a suspect in a sexual assault case filed. He was granted bail shortly after.

== See also ==
- List of India cricketers who have taken five-wicket hauls on Test debut
