= Parikshit Valsangkar =

Indian cricketer (born 1995)

Personal information
- Born: 24 February 1995 (age 31)
- Source: Cricinfo, 7 January 2018

Parikshit Valsangkar (born 24 February 1995) is an Indian cricketer. He made his Twenty20 debut for Mumbai in the 2017–18 Zonal T20 League on 7 January 2018. He made his List A debut on 14 December 2021, for Mumbai in the 2021–22 Vijay Hazare Trophy.
