= Abhishek Das (cricketer) =

Indian cricketer (born 1990)

Personal information
- Full name: Abhishek Amalendubikash Das
- Born: 4 September 1990 (age 36); Ichapore, West Bengal, India
- Batting: Right-handed
- Bowling: Right-arm off-break

Domestic team information
- Years: Team
- 2013–present: Bengal
- Source: ESPNcricinfo, 27 March 2016

Abhishek Das (born 4 September 1990) is an Indian cricketer. He played in two first-class and nine Twenty20 matches for Bengal between 2013 and 2016. He made his List A debut on 8 December 2021, for Bengal in the 2021–22 Vijay Hazare Trophy.

== See also ==
- List of Bengal cricketers
