= Sachin Baby =

Indian cricketer (born 1988)

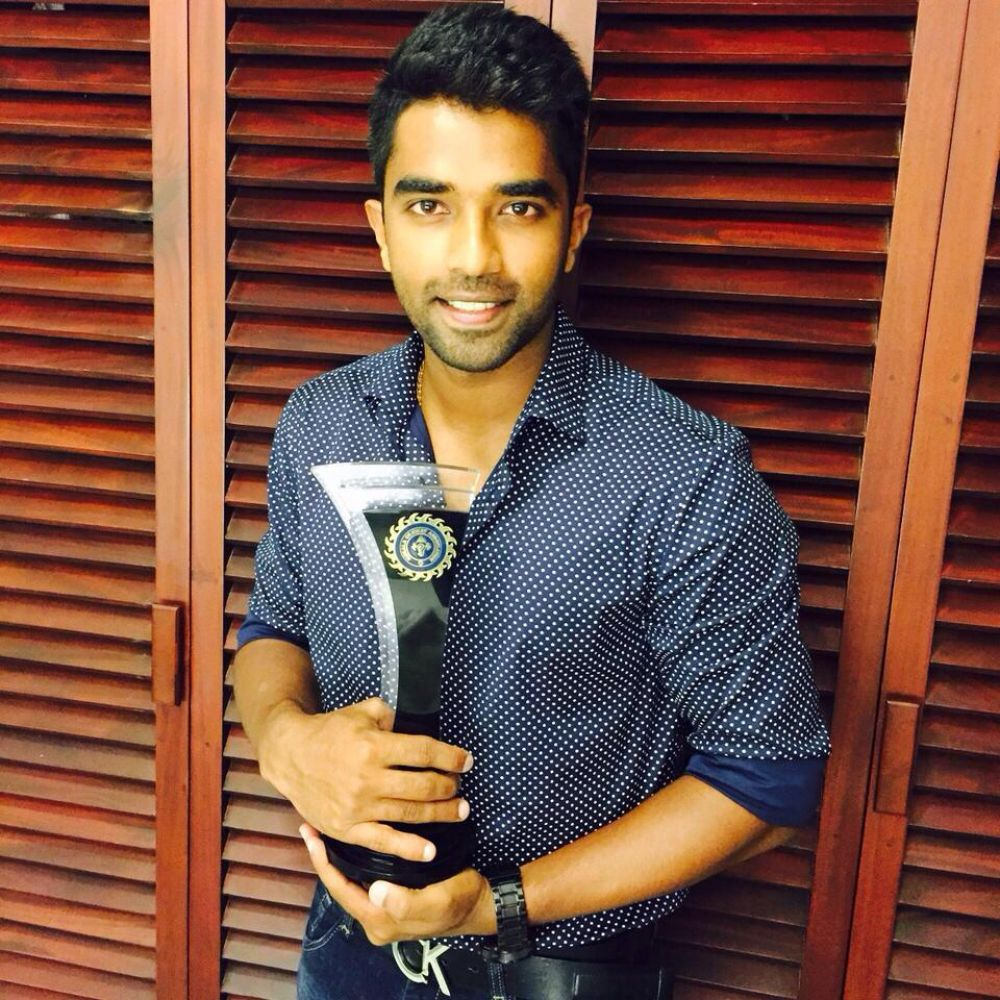

Personal information
- Born: 18 December 1988 (age 37); Thodupuzha, Kerala, India
- Batting: Left-handed
- Bowling: Right-arm off break
- Role: Batsman

Domestic team information
- Years: Team
- 2009–present: Kerala
- 2013: Rajasthan Royals
- 2016–2017, 2021: Royal Challengers Bangalore
- 2024–present: Aries Kollam Sailors
- 2025: Sunrisers Hyderabad

Career statistics
Competition	FC	LA	T20
Matches	100	102	102
Runs scored	5,747	3,266	2,026
Batting average	39.90	40.32	29.79
100s/50s	14/29	4/22	0/10
Top score	250*	127	79
Balls bowled	1,050	628	200
Wickets	12	14	8
Bowling average	47.83	43.21	32.62
5 wickets in innings	0	0	0
10 wickets in match	0	–	–
Best bowling	3/24	2/5	2/4
Catches/stumpings	93/–	28/–	40/–
- Source: ESPNcricinfo, 20 March 2025

Sachin Baby (born 18 December 1988) is an Indian cricketer who plays for Kerala in domestic cricket. He is a left-handed middle-order batsman and occasional right-arm off spinner.

== Early life and education ==
Sachin was born on 18 December 1988 at Thodupuzha in Idukki district of Kerala. He was named after Sachin Tendulkar by his parents. He completed his early education from Vishwadeepthi Public School and SNDP School, Adimali.

== Cricket career ==
Sachin made his first-class debut for Kerala on 3 November 2009 in the 2009–10 Ranji Trophy. He made his List A debut for Kerala on 13 February 2011 in the 2010–11 Vijay Hazare Trophy. He made his Twenty20 debut for Kerala on 16 October 2011 in the 2011–12 Syed Mushtaq Ali Trophy.

Sachin scored heavily in the 2012–13 Vijay Hazare Trophy hitting 298 runs from seven matches with an average of 74.50. He scored his maiden List A century in the quarter-finals of the tournament, securing a place for Kerala in the final four. He represented South Zone in the 2012–13 Deodhar Trophy.

In August 2013, Sachin was named to the India A squad to play three unofficial ODIs against New Zealand A team.

Sachin was named Kerala's captain in the 2014–15 Ranji Trophy and made his maiden first-class century with an unbeaten 200 in the season. He scored a career-best score of 250 in the 2016–17 Ranji Trophy in the match against Services and was declared the man of the match.

Sachin was the captain of the Kerala team which qualified to play the quarter-finals of Ranji Trophy for the first time in the 2017–18 season. This was followed by the team's historic entry to the semi-finals of the tournament in the next season, again under his leadership.

Sachin's partnership of 338 runs with Sanju Samson in the match against Goa in the 2019–20 Vijay Hazare Trophy is the highest partnership in List-A cricket for Indian cricket and third highest in the format.

== Indian Premier League ==
Sachin was signed by Rajasthan Royals ahead of the 2013 Indian Premier League. However, he hardly got any batting opportunities in the four matches he represented the team.

Sachin was picked by Royal Challengers Bangalore in the 2016 auction. He played 11 matches in the season, scoring just 119 runs with an average of 29.75.

In January 2018, Sachin was bought by the Sunrisers Hyderabad in the 2018 IPL auction. In February 2021, Sachin was bought again by the Royal Challengers Bangalore in the IPL auction ahead of the 2021 Indian Premier League.In December 2024, Sachin was bought again by the Sunrisers Hyderabad in the IPL auction ahead of 2025 Indian Premier League

== Kerala Cricket League ==
Sachin Baby served as the captain and icon player of the Aries Kollam Sailors Team in the Kerala Cricket League. He scored two impressive centuries and four half-centuries in the tournament. His century in the final match was pivotal, helping his team secure their maiden KCL Trophy by defeating the Calicut Globestars. For his outstanding performance in the final, he was adjudged Man of the Match, further solidifying his reputation as a key player in the league.

== Personal life ==
Sachin married his girlfriend Anna Chandy on 5 January 2017, at St Sebastain's Church, Thodupuzha. The couple have a son.

Sachin released the official teaser of his YouTube channel Sachin Baby Official on 15 July 2020.
