= List of Odisha cricketers =

This is a list of cricketers who have played first-class, List A or Twenty20 cricket for Odisha cricket team, previously known as the Orissa cricket team.

== A ==
- A K Adhikari
- Pawan Agarwal
- Sridhar Alva
- Haji Amin
- Vemulapally Arvind

== B ==
- P Badrayya
- N D Bardhan
- Ajay Barik
- Alekha Barik
- Manoj Barik
- Sushil Barik
- Mushtaq Beg
- Deepak Behera
- Jayanta Behera
- Natraj Behera
- Niranjan Behera
- Sanjay Behera
- Subrat Behera
- P Bhadrya
- Anil Bhardwaj
- Manojit Bhatt
- R K Bhave
- Subhashish Bhuyan
- B Bishanjee
- Chiranjib Biswal
- Kartik Biswal
- Ranjib Biswal
- Subit Biswal
- Gopal Bose
- P Bose
- Pannalal Bose
- Rajayya Bosi

== C ==
- N Chakrabarty
- T Chakraborty
- Ramesh Chandok
- A K Channa
- Kanwar Singh Chohan
- Gourav Choudhury
- Pradyumna Chowdhury
- Soumitra Chowdhury
- M C Clerici

== D ==
- Aloke Das
- Ashok Das
- Amit Das
- Ashutosh Das
- Brajendra Das
- Gopal Das
- Govind Das
- Halhadar Das
- Jagannath Das
- Pritamjeet Das
- Pradip Das
- Pranab Das
- Pratik Das
- Rashmi Das
- Rishikesh Das
- Sritam Das
- Shiv Sunder Das
- Sovan Deb
- Kamal Dey
- Raj Dhawan
- Rajesh Dhuper
- Karun Dubey
- K S Dureja

== G ==
- Supti Ghosh
- B J Godbole
- Gautam Gopal
- Anshuman Gope
- Asit Goswami
- Vinod Gupta

== H ==
- Sukesh Heera
- Charles Hindley
- S Hiramat
- Sabir Hussain

== I ==
- Haji Iqbal

== J ==
- Asjit Jaiprakasham
- Ankitkar Jaiswal
- Pinninti Jayachandra
- Alokananda Jena
- Ashokananda Jena
- Bibekananda Jena
- Bisuddhananda Jena
- Chinmayananda Jena
- Srikanth Jena
- Santosh Jena

== K ==
- Sourav Kanojia
- Debabrata Kanungo
- M Kanungo
- Subhrajyoti Kanungo
- Ram Kapoor
- P Kar
- Shahid Ali Khan
- Abinasha Khatua
- Abakash Khatua
- Sukanta Khatua
- Dhiraj Kumar
- Mohan Kumar
- Suresh Kumar
- Devendra Kunwar

== L ==
- Robert le Faucheur
- Debdutta Lenka
- Sujit Lenka
- Prabin Luha

== M ==
- Surjit Mahalik
- Devashish Mahanti
- D Mahapatra
- Suresh Mahapatra
- Sabyasachi Mahapatra
- M Maisonia
- Abhilash Mallick
- S C Mallick
- Alok Mangaraj
- Deepak Mangaraj
- Dipti Ranjan Mishra
- Shantanu Mishra
- Surya Mishra
- P K Misra
- S S Misra
- Swapan Mitra
- Ashish Mohanty
- Amaresh Mohanty
- Aditya Mohanty
- Bikram Mohanty
- Biswajit Mohanty
- Basantkumar Mohanty
- Bishnu Mohanty
- Biswajit Mohanty
- Snehanshu Mohanty
- Debashish Mohanty
- Dinakrushna Mohanty
- Jeemuta Mohanty
- Madan Mohanty
- Rajesh Mohanty
- Rakesh Mohanty
- Sarbeswar Mohanty
- Sidhartha Mohanty
- Sujan Mohanty
- Sujit Mohanty
- Subash Mohanty
- Satya Mohanty
- Sameer Mohanty
- Yashpal Mohanty
- Biswa Mohapatra
- Lalitendu Mohapatra
- Prasanta Mohapatra
- Sourajit Mohapatra
- Sayed Samiruddin Moinuddin
- Robin Morris
- Sandeep Mulia
- Pravanjan Mullick
- Om Munde
- A S Narasimha Murthy
- D S Murthy
- N B K Murthy
- S Mushtaq Ali

== N ==
- Biswajit Nag
- Gautam Nag
- Pravat Nayak
- Subham Nayak

== P ==
- Ashok Padhi
- Nimal Padhi
- Krishna Palai
- A. Panda
- Bibhudutta Panda
- Rabi Narayan Panda
- S B Pande
- Priyatosh Paramanik
- Rashmi Parida
- Lalitendu Parija
- Arun Patel
- Kanak Patel
- Kishore Patel
- Manoj Patel
- Paresh Patel
- Rajkishan Patel
- Sudhir Pathak
- Bikas Pati
- Banabasi Patnaik
- Balivada Patnaik
- Brajabanhu Patnaik
- Goutam Patnaik
- Jaya Krishna Patnaik
- P Patnaik
- Prafulla Patnaik
- R C Patnaik
- S K Patnaik
- S N Patnaik
- Sasanka Patnaik
- Urdhav Patnaik
- K N Patra
- R N Patra
- Shesdeep Patra
- Rakesh Pattnaik
- Sandeep Pattnaik
- Vinod Pendarkar
- Govinda Poddar
- Debabrata Pradhan
- Priyabrata Pradhan
- Suryakant Pradhan
- Harmohan Praharaj
- Sumitosh Praharaj
- Sushil Kumar Prasad
- Sanjee Prasad
- S K Prasad
- G Purshottam

== R ==
- S Raghuram
- Ashish Rai
- Anil Rajput
- B Rajya
- G Ramamurthy
- Nabhi Ramamurthy
- M S Ananthaswamy Rao
- Babu Rao
- G S Rao
- MV Rama Rao
- VV Rama Rao
- P Ramayyha
- BV Ram Raju
- T Ram Sastry
- Prasanta Rana
- Kunigal Ranganna
- Anshuman Rath
- R K Rath
- Sushanta Rath
- Yashwant Rath
- Harshit Rathod
- H T Rathod
- K C V Ratnam
- Sanjay Raul
- Abhishek Raut
- M Ravindra
- Saurabh Rawat
- Amiya Ray
- G V Renga Rao
- Roshan Kumar Rao
- Sunil Roul
- Aditya Rout
- Bikash Rout
- Daniel Rout
- Dhirendra Rout
- Girjia Rout
- Bimal Roy
- Manash Roy
- Pappu Roy
- S Roy
- S N Roy
- Mukul Roy Chowdhury
- Prakash Roy Chowdhury

== S ==
- Tarani Sa
- Abinash Saha
- Alok Chandra Sahoo
- Goutam Sahoo
- Prasanta Sahoo
- Somnath Sahoo
- Subhrajit Sahoo
- Tukuna Sahoo
- J Sahu
- Mohammad Sajid
- Lagnajit Samal
- Swastik Samal
- Biplab Samantray
- Debasish Samantray
- Anurag Sarangi
- P Sarkar
- Tamayya Sastri
- Sanjay Satpathy
- Sanjay Kumar Satpathy
- Santanu Satpathy
- Satya Ranjan Satpathy
- Mahipal Saudagar
- Sourabha Sehgal
- Subhranshu Senapati
- Rajiv Seth
- G Shankar
- Kuldeep Sharma
- Manjaya Shetty
- B Shiva
- BK Sikdar
- R Sikdar
- Arabind Singh
- Baljit Singh
- Bipin Singh
- Dhiraj Singh
- Gurmeet Singh
- Paramjit Singh
- Prayash Singh
- Randhir Singh
- Ranjit Singh
- Rajesh Singh
- Sukhbinder Singh
- Payas Ranjan Sinha
- G Srichandran
- Mirmisa Sridhar
- Ramanathalingam Srikant
- N Subba Rao
- K V Subramaniam
- M Sukheja
- Mangu Suryanarayan
- Aashirwad Swain
- Nyayapathy Swamy
- Snehanshu Mohanty

== T ==
- B Thripathi
- Walter Toppo

== V ==
- Harish Vijh

== Y ==
- Abhishek Yadav
- Ankit Yadav
