= 2016–17 Vijay Hazare Trophy Group A =

- Dates: 25 February 2017 – 6 March 2017
- Administrator(s): BCCI
- Cricket format: List A cricket
- Tournament format(s): Round-robin and playoff format
- Host(s): Delhi
- Participants: 7
- Matches: 21
- Official website: Official website

The 2016–17 Vijay Hazare Trophy is the 15th season of the Vijay Hazare Trophy, a List A cricket tournament in India. It will be contested by 28 domestic cricket teams of India.

== Points table ==
Pos	Team	Pld	W	L	T	NR	Pts	NRR	Qualification
1	Vidarbha	6	5	1	0	0	20	0.776	Knockout Stage
2	Baroda	6	4	2	0	0	16	0.376	Knockout Stage
3	Haryana	6	3	3	0	0	12	−0.118	
4	Punjab	6	3	3	0	0	12	−0.227	
5	Odisha	6	2	4	0	0	8	0.208	
6	Railways	6	2	4	0	0	8	0.038	
7	Assam	6	2	4	0	0	8	−1.042	

== Fixtures ==
=== Round 1 ===
25 February 2017
09:00 IST
Scorecard

Baroda; 259/9 (50 overs)	v	Railways; 229 (46.4 overs)
Deepak Hooda 119 (106); Anureet Singh 2/43 (10 overs)		Saurabh Wakaskar 58 (83); Krunal Pandya 3/32 (6.4 overs)

Baroda won by 30 runs
Palam A Stadium, New Delhi
Umpires: Saiyed Khalid and Nand Kishore

- Railways won the toss and elected to field.
- Babashafi Pathan, Atit Sheth, Soaeb Tai (Baroda) and Mrunal Devdhar (Railways) all made their List A debuts.

25 February 2017
09:00 IST
Scorecard

Odisha; 229 (47.5 overs)	v	Haryana; 230/5 (48.2 overs)
Sandeep Pattnaik 91 (121); Mohit Sharma 2/33 (8 overs)		Chaitanya Bishnoi 83* (126); Govinda Poddar 2/30 (10 overs)

Haryana won by 5 wickets
Karnail Singh Stadium, New Delhi
Umpires: K. N. Ananthapadmanabhan and Krishnamachari Bharatan

- Odisha won the toss and elected to bat.
- Himanshu Rana, Shubham Rohilla, Rahul Tewatia (Haryana); Abhishek Yadav, Sandeep Pattnaik and Subhranshu Senapati (Odisha) all made their List A debuts.

25 February 2017
09:00 IST
Scorecard

Vidarbha; 218 (49.3 overs)	v	Punjab; 219/4 (41.1 overs)
Ambati Rayudu 86 (109); Siddharth Kaul 4/33 (10 overs)		Mandeep Singh 86 (104); Akshay Karnewar 1/39 (10 overs)

Punjab won by 6 wickets
Feroz Shah Kotla, Delhi
Umpires: Yeshwant Barde and Krishnamachari Srinivasan

- Vidarbha won the toss and elected to bat.
- Abhishek Sharma, Shubman Gill (Punjab); Rushabh Rathod and Yash Thakur (Vidarbha) all made their List A debuts.

=== Round 2 ===
26 February 2017
09:00 IST
Scorecard

Punjab; 243 (49.4 overs)	v	Assam; 247/7 (48.4 overs)
Shubman Gill 121(129); Arup Das 3/27 (10 overs)		Amit Verma 65(91); Sandeep Sharma 3/52 (9.4 overs)

Assam won by 3 wickets
Feroz Shah Kotla, Delhi
Umpires: Krishnamachari Bharatan and Saiyed Khalid

- Punjab won the toss and elected to bat.

26 February 2017
09:00 IST
Scorecard

Vidarbha; 251/5 (45 overs)	v	Baroda; 229 (42.4 overs)
Apoorv Wankhade 62(46); Babashafi Pathan 2/44 (8 overs)		Aditya Waghmode 79(91); Yash Thakur 3/64 (8.4 overs)

Vidarbha won by 22 runs
Karnail Singh Stadium, New Delhi
Umpires: Nand Kishore and Krishnamachari Srinivasan

- Vidarbha won the toss and elected to bat.
- Abhishek Chaurasia (Vidarbha) made his List A debut.

26 February 2017
09:00 IST
Scorecard

Railways; 252/7 (50 overs)	v	Haryana; 181 (38 overs)
Arindam Ghosh 76 (86); Rahul Tewatia 2/46 (10 overs)		Rahul Dagar 57 (68); Hitesh Kadam 4/38 (6 overs)

Railways won by 71 runs
Palam A Stadium, New Delhi
Umpires: K. N. Ananthapadmanabhan and Yeshwant Barde

- Railways won the toss and elected to bat.
- Amit Rana, Shivam Chauhan (Haryana); Hitesh Kadam and Pratham Singh (Railways) all made their List A debuts.

=== Round 3 ===
28 February 2017
09:00 IST
Scorecard

Assam; 207 (48.2 overs)	v	Odisha; 213/1 (35.3 overs)
Arun Karthik 56 (73); Basant Mohanty 5/26 (9.2 overs)		Anurag Sarangi 104* (121); Arup Das 1/48 (9 overs)

Odisha won by 9 wickets
Feroz Shah Kotla, Delhi
Umpires: K. N. Ananthapadmanabhan and Krishnamachari Srinivasan

- Odisha won the toss and elected to field.

28 February 2017
09:00 IST
Scorecard

Baroda; 249 (48.3 overs)	v	Punjab; 174 (40.4 overs)
Krunal Pandya 78 (105); Baltej Singh 4/47 (9 overs)		Gurkeerat Singh 62 (85); Hardik Pandya 3/26 (8.4 overs)

Baroda won by 75 runs
Karnail Singh Stadium, New Delhi
Umpires: Krishnamachari Bharatan and Saiyed Khalid

- Punjab won the toss and elected to field.

28 February 2017
09:00 IST
Scorecard

Railways; 199 (41.4 overs)	v	Vidarbha; 200/2 (45.2 overs)
Manjeet Singh 54 (30); Akshay Karnewar 3/32 (9 overs)		Jitesh Sharma 84 (114); Hitesh Kadam 1/41 (7 overs)

Vidarbha won by 8 wickets
Palam A Stadium, New Delhi
Umpires: Yeshwant Barde and Nand Kishore

- Railways won the toss and elected to bat.

=== Round 4 ===
1 March 2017
09:00 IST
Scorecard

Haryana; 306/6 (49 overs)	v	Assam; 253/9 (49 overs)
Shubham Rohilla 118(136); Amit Verma 3/47 (6 overs)		Pritam Das 65 (43); Chaitanya Bishnoi 2/15 (4 overs)

Haryana won by 53 runs
Karnail Singh Stadium, New Delhi
Umpires: Yeshwant Barde and Krishnamachari Bharatan

- Haryana won the toss and elected to bat.
- Match was reduced to 49 overs per side.

1 March 2017
09:00 IST
Scorecard

Odisha; 281/7 (50 overs)	v	Baroda; 284/5 (46.2 overs)
Govinda Poddar 77 (86); Swapnil Singh 3/58 (10 overs)		Aditya Waghmode 92 (82); Dhiraj Singh 2/51 (9 overs)

Baroda won by 5 wickets
Feroz Shah Kotla, Delhi
Umpires: K. N. Ananthapadmanabhan and Krishnamachari Srinivasan

- Baroda won the toss and elected to field.

1 March 2017
09:00 IST
Scorecard

Railways; 246/9 (50 overs)	v	Punjab; 247/7 (49.1 overs)
Arindam Ghosh 83 (100); Yuvraj Singh 2/35 (7 overs)		Gurkeerat Singh Mann 69 (84); Ashish Yadav 3/41 (10 overs)

Punjab won by 3 wickets
Palam A Stadium, New Delhi
Umpires: Saiyed Khalid and Nand Kishore

- Punjab won the toss and elected to field.
- Mohit Handa (Punjab), Akash Yadav and Gaurav Khatri (Railways) all made their List A debuts.

=== Round 5 ===
3 March 2017
09:00 IST
Scorecard

Assam; 216/6 (48 overs)	v	Railways; 215/10 (48.3 overs)
Pallavkumar Das 44(48); Ashish Yadav 3/26 (10 overs)		Akash Verma 55(82); Arup Das 3/36 (9 overs)

Assam won by 4 wickets
Feroz Shah Kotla, Delhi
Umpires: Yeshwant Barde and Saiyed Khalid

- Riyan Parag and Mrinmoy Dutta (Assam) both made their List A debuts.

3 March 2017
09:00 IST
Scorecard

Haryana; 196/10 (48.5 overs)	v	Punjab; 200/5 (41.4 overs)
Nitin Saini 48(80); Harbhajan Singh 4/33 (10 overs)		Gurkeerat Singh Mann 91(86); Rahul Tewatia 3/49 (9 overs)

Punjab won by 5 wickets
Palam A Stadium, New Delhi
Umpires: Krishnamachari Bharatan and Nand Kishore

- Anmolpreet Singh and Nikhil Chaudhary (Punjab) both made their List A debuts.

3 March 2017
09:00 IST
Scorecard

Odisha; 162 (45.3 overs)	v	Vidarbha; 163/3 (40.1 overs)
Govinda Poddar 59 (68); Akshay Karnewar 4/21 (10 overs)		Jitesh Sharma 70 (71); Rajkishan Patel 2/32 (10 overs)

Vidarbha won by 7 wickets
Karnail Singh Stadium, New Delhi
Umpires: K. N. Ananthapadmanabhan and Krishnamachari Srinivasan

- Odisha won the toss and elected to bat.
- Rajkishan Patel (Odisha) made his List A debut.

=== Round 6 ===
4 March 2017
09:00 IST
Scorecard

Baroda; 233/6 (50 overs)	v	Assam; 141 (42.3 overs)
Krunal Pandya 72 (101); Pritam Das 3/37 (8 overs)		Rishav Das 44 (99); Krunal Pandya 4/20 (7.3 overs)

Baroda won by 92 runs
Karnail Singh Stadium, New Delhi
Umpires: K. N. Ananthapadmanabhan and Krishnamachari Bharatan

- Assam won the toss and elected to field.

4 March 2017
09:00 IST
Scorecard

Haryana; 169(42.3 OVERS)	v	Vidarbha; 237/9(50 OVERS)
Shivam Chauhan 46(62); Akshay Wakhare 3/38 (10 overs)		Ganesh Satish 78(116); Mohit Sharma 2/36 (8 overs)

Vidarbha won by 68 runs
Feroz Shah Kotla, Delhi
Umpires: Yeshwant Barde and Krishnamachari Srinivasan

- Sanjay Pahal (Haryana) made his List A debut.

4 March 2017
09:00 IST
Scorecard

Odisha; 228/8(50 OVERS)	v	Railways; 231/4(49 OVERS)
Sandeep Pattnaik 85(117); Amit Mishra 2/31 (6 overs)		Mahesh Rawat 88(97); Govinda Poddar 2/35 (8 overs)

Railways won by 6 wickets
Palam A Stadium, New Delhi
Umpires: Saiyed Khalid and Nand Kishore

- Ambikeshwar Mishra and Satender Thakran (Railways) both made their List A debuts.

=== Round 7 ===
6 March 2017
09:00 IST
Scorecard

Assam; 169(41.1 OVERS)	v	Vidarbha; 273/9(50 OVERS)
Rishav Das 57(96); Abhishek Chaurasia 6/37 (10 overs)		Jitesh Sharma 83(80); Pritam Das 3/52 (10 overs)

Vidarbha won by 104 runs
Karnail Singh Stadium, New Delhi
Umpires: Saiyed Khalid and Krishnamachari Srinivasan

- Siddhesh Wath (Vidarbha) made his List A debut.

6 March 2017
09:00 IST
Scorecard

Haryana; 266/5 (50 overs)	v	Baroda; 181 (40.1 overs)
Rahul Tewatia 78* (60); Swapnil Singh 2/27 (10 overs)		Kedar Devdhar 81 (113); Ashish Hooda 3/32 (8 overs)

Haryana won by 85 runs
Feroz Shah Kotla, Delhi
Umpires: K. N. Ananthapadmanabhan and Yeshwant Barde

- Haryana won the toss and elected to bat.

6 March 2017
09:00 IST
Scorecard

Odisha; 240(49.5 OVERS)	v	Punjab; 171(30 OVERS)
Govinda Poddar 120(119); Siddarth Kaul 3/32 (10 overs)		Anmolpreet Singh 58(41); Dhiraj Singh 5/49 (10 overs)

Odisha won by 69 runs
Palam A Stadium, New Delhi
Umpires: Krishnamachari Bharatan and Nand Kishore

- Debabrata Pradhan, Prayash Singh (Odisha) and Varun Khanna (Punjab) all made their List A debuts.
