= 2015–16 Syed Mushtaq Ali Trophy Group D =

- Dates: 2 January 2016 – 7 January 2016
- Administrator: BCCI
- Cricket format: Twenty20 cricket
- Tournament format: Round robin
- Host: Odisha
- Participants: 6
- Matches: 15

The 2015–16 Syed Mushtaq Ali Trophy is the seventh season of the Syed Mushtaq Ali Trophy, a domestic Twenty20 cricket tournament in India. There are 27 domestic cricket teams competing, divided into 4 groups.

== Teams ==
The following 6 teams have been drafted into Group D.

- Mumbai
- Odisha (host)
- Karnataka
- Services
- Uttar Pradesh
- Maharashtra

== Fixtures ==
=== Round 1 ===
2 January
scorecard

Maharashtra; 109/7 (12 overs)	v	Uttar Pradesh; 113/3 (11.2 overs)

Uttar Pradesh won by 7 wickets
DRIEMS Ground, Cuttack

- Saurabh Dubey (Uttar Pradesh) made his T20 debut.
- Piyush Chawla (Uttar Pradesh) took a hat-trick in this match.

2 January
scorecard

Odisha; 91 (17.4 overs)	v	Mumbai; 95/4 (15.5 overs)

Mumbai won by 6 wickets
Barabati Stadium, Cuttack

- Abhishek Yadav and Tukuna Sahoo (Odisha) both made their T20 debuts.

2 January
scorecard

Karnataka; 121/9 (20 overs)	v	Services; 122/7 (19 overs)

Services won by 3 wickets
Barabati Stadium, Cuttack

- Mohammed Taha (Karnataka), Deepak Rai and Nitin Yadav (Services) all made their T20 debuts.

=== Round 2 ===
3 January
scorecard

Uttar Pradesh; 150/5 (20 overs)	v	Odisha; 118/8 (20 overs)

Uttar Pradesh won by 32 runs
Barabati Stadium, Cuttack

3 January
scorecard

Karnataka; 162 (20 overs)	v	Mumbai; 161 (20 overs)

Karnataka won by 1 run
DRIEMS Ground, Cuttack

3 January
scorecard

Maharashtra; 159/8 (20 overs)	v	Services; 128 (18.3 overs)

Maharashtra won by 31 runs
Barabati Stadium, Cuttack

- Satyajeet Bachhav (Maharashtra) made his T20 debut.

=== Round 3 ===
4 January
scorecard

Karnataka; 160/6 (20 overs)	v	Uttar Pradesh; 161/5 (19.1 overs)

Uttar Pradesh won by 5 wickets
DRIEMS Ground, Cuttack

4 January
scorecard

Services; 127/7 (20 overs)	v	Mumbai; 128/2 (18.1 overs)

Barabati Stadium, Cuttack

4 January
scorecard

Odisha; 183/4 (20 overs)	v	Maharashtra; 184/6 (20 overs)

Maharashtra won by 4 wickets
Barabati Stadium, Cuttack

- Manoj Barik and Rishikesh Das (Odisha) both made their T20 debuts.

=== Round 4 ===
7 January
scorecard

Odisha; 176/4 (20 overs)	v	Services; 177/6 (19.2 overs)

Services won by 4 wickets
DRIEMS Ground, Cuttack

7 January
scorecard

Mumbai; 164/6 (20 overs)	v	Uttar Pradesh; 168/6 (19.4 overs)

Uttar Pradesh won by 4 wickets
Barabati Stadium, Cuttack

7 January
scorecard

Maharashtra; 184/8 (20 overs)	v	Karnataka; 158 (18.3 overs)

Maharashtra won by 26 runs
Barabati Stadium, Cuttack

=== Round 5 ===
8 January
scorecard

Odisha; 102/7 (20 overs)	v	Karnataka; 106/4 (17.5 overs)

Karnataka won by 6 wickets
Barabati Stadium, Cuttack

8 January
scorecard

Uttar Pradesh; 182/6 (20 overs)	v	Services; 125/9 (20 overs)

Uttar Pradesh won by 57 runs
Barabati Stadium, Cuttack

- Shubham Chaubey and Saurabh Kumar (Uttar Pradesh) both made their T20 debuts.

8 January
scorecard

Maharashtra; 155/8 (20 overs)	v	Mumbai; 157/2 (16.1 overs)

Mumbai won by 8 wickets
DRIEMS Ground, Cuttack
