= Sahoo =

Sahoo is an Indian Odia surname found predominantly in Odisha. This surname is mainly used by Brahmin community in Odisha.

== Notable people ==
- Ainthu Sahoo (1928 - 2013), Indian politician
- Alok Chandra Sahoo (born 1989), Indian cricketer
- Anwesh Sahoo (born 1995), Indian blogger
- Batakrushna Sahoo, Indian farmer
- Dinabandhu Sahoo (born 1961), Indian botanist
- Mahesh Sahoo, Indian politician
- Mohapatra Nilamani Sahoo (1926–2016), Indian short story writer
- Sarojini Sahoo (born 1956), Indian feminist writer
- Subhrajit Sahoo (born 1988), Indian cricketer
- Subrat Sahoo (born 1968), Indian politician
- Sudarshan Sahoo (born 1939), Indian sculptor
- Tukuna Sahoo (born 1987), Indian cricketer
