= List of Odisha first-class cricket records =

This is a List of Odisha first-class cricket records, with each list containing the top five performances in the category.

Currently active players are bolded.

== Team records ==
=== Highest innings totals ===
Rank	Score	Opponent	Season
1	671/6 dec	Bengal	2001/02
2	625/8 dec	Bihar	2001/02
3	589/5 dec	Gujarat	2002/03
4	561	Delhi	1998/99
5	552/7 dec	Jammu and Kashmir	2006/07
Source: CricketArchive. Last updated: 19 October 2016.

=== Lowest innings totals ===
Rank	Score	Opponent	Season
1	35	Bihar	1958/59
2	37	Bengal	2015/16
3	44	Bihar	1949/50
4	51	Bengal	1970/71
5	58	Bengal	1954/55
Source: CricketArchive. Last updated: 19 October 2016.

=== Largest margin of innings victory ===
Rank	Margin	Opponent	Season
1	inns & 293 runs	Himachal Pradesh	2005/06
2	inns & 234 runs	Assam	1997/98
3	inns & 209 runs	Tripura	1995/96
4	inns & 197 runs	Tripura	1990/91
5	inns & 182 runs	Tripura	1999/91
Source: CricketArchive. Last updated: 19 October 2016.

=== Largest margin of runs victory ===
Rank	Margin	Opponent	Season
1	429 runs	Assam	2001/02
2	420 runs	Jammu and Kashmir	2000/01
3	209 runs	Saurashtra	1999/00
4	188 runs	Tripura	1996/97
5	180 runs	Himachal Pradesh	2003/04
Source: CricketArchive. Last updated: 19 October 2016.

== Batting records ==
=== Highest individual scores ===
Rank	Score	Player	Opponent	Season
1	300*	Shiv Sunder Das	Jammu and Kashmir	2006/07
2	277	**Subhranshu Senapati**	Madhya Pradesh	2023/24
2	255*	Natraj Behera	Haryana	2015/16
3	253	Shiv Sunder Das	Bengal	2001/02
4	225	Govinda Poddar	Assam	2016/17
5	220	Rashmi Parida	Jammu and Kashmir	2000/01
Source: CricketArchive. Last updated: 12 August 2024.

== Bowling records ==
=== Best innings bowling ===
Rank	Score	Player	Opponent	Season
1	9/52	Sushil Prasad	Tripura	1990/91
2	8/22	Sushil Prasad	Bihar	1988/89
3	8/50	ND Bardhan	Bihar	1949/50
4	8/54	Mahipal Saudagar	Assam	1987/88
5	8/78	Santanu Satpathy	Assam	1959/60
Source: CricketArchive. Last updated: 19 October 2016.

=== Best match bowling ===
Rank	Score	Player	Opponent	Season
1	15/89	Sushil Prasad	Tripura	1990/91
2	13/63	Sourajit Mohapatra	Tripura	1987/88
Source: CricketArchive. Last updated: 19 October 2016.

=== Hat-Trick ===
Rank	Player	Opponent	Season
1	Sourajit Mohapatra	Tripura	1987/88
2	Ajay Barik	Assam	2001/02
3	Basant Mohanty	Delhi	2015/16
4	**Suryakant Pradhan**	Bengal	2022/23
Source: CricketArchive. Last updated: 12 August 2024.

== See also ==
- Odisha cricket team
- List of Odisha List A cricket records

== Notes ==
All lists are referenced to CricketArchive.
