= List of Odisha List A cricket records =

This is a list of Odisha List A cricket records, with each list containing the top five performances in the category.

Currently active players are bolded.

== Team records ==
=== Highest innings totals ===
Rank	Score	Opponent	Season
1	353/4	Bihar	2000/01
2	353/4	Jharkhand	2012/13
3	350/6	Tripura	2004/15
4	291/5	Tripura	2002/03
5	291	Tripura	2011/12
Source: CricketArchive. Last updated: 19 October 2016.

=== Lowest innings totals ===
Rank	Score	Opponent	Season
1	97	Wills' XI	1983/84
Source: CricketArchive. Last updated: 19 October 2016.

=== Largest Margin of Runs Victory ===
Rank	Margin	Opponent	Season
1	235 runs	Jharkhand	2012/13
2	217 runs	Tripura	2002/03
3	193 runs	Bihar	2000/01
4	117 runs	Tripura	2004/05
5	112 runs	Bihar	1993/94
Source: CricketArchive. Last updated: 19 October 2016.

== Batting records ==
=== Highest individual scores ===
Rank	Score	Player	Opponent	Season
1	145	Biswa Mohapatra	Tripura	2004/05
2	136	Govinda Podder	Assam	2011/12
3	132	Aravinda Singh	Jharkhand	2012/13
4	126	Paresh Patel	Jharkhand	2012/13
5	123*	Paresh Patel	Bengal	2009/10
Source: CricketArchive. Last updated: 19 October 2016.

== Bowling records ==
=== Best innings bowling ===
Rank	Score	Player	Opponent	Season
1	7/39	Suryakant Pradhan	Jharkhand	2012/13
2	5/22	Debasis Mohanty	Bengal	2000/01
3	5/30	Robin Morris	Assam	1999/00
4	5/31	Sanjay Raul	Tripura	1999/00
5	5/36	Sanjay Satpathy	Bihar	2000/01
Source: CricketArchive. Last updated: 19 October 2016.

== See also ==
- Odisha cricket team
- List of Odisha first-class cricket records

== Notes ==
All lists are referenced to CricketArchive.
