= Devendra Kunwar =

Devendra Kunwar may refer to:

- Devendra Kunwar (cricketer)
- Devendra Kunwar (politician)
