= Handa (surname) =

Handa (written: 半田 or 範田) is a Japanese surname. Notable people with the surname include:

== Japan ==
- Dogen Handa (半田 道玄, 1915–1974), Japanese Go player
- Etsuko Handa (半田 悦子, born 1965), Japanese women's footballer
- Haruhisa Handa (半田 晴久, born 1951, also known as Toshu Fukami), Japanese religious leader and businessman
- Keishi Handa (半田 圭史, born 1977), Japanese basketball player
- Kento Handa (半田 健人, born 1984), Japanese actor
- Riku Handa (半田 陸, born 2002), Japanese footballer
- Takeshi Handa (半田 武嗣, born 1985), Japanese footballer
- Watari Handa (半田 亘理, 1911–1948), Japanese naval aviator and World War II flying ace
- Yuriko Handa (半田 百合子, born 1940), Japanese volleyball player

== India ==
- Barbie Handa, Indian actress and model
- Malika Handa, Indian deaf chess player
- Mohit Handa, Indian cricketer
- Nelu Handa, Canadian comedian
- O. C. Handa, Indian historian
- Ripudaman Handa, Indian celebrity chef
- Rupinder Handa, Punjabi singer
- Sophia Handa, Indian actress and model
- Vipin Handa, Indian TV personality

== Fictional characters ==
- Shinobu Handa (藩田 思信), a character in the manga series Shōjo Sect
- Seishū Handa (半田 清舟), a character in the manga series Barakamon
