= Patara (caste) =

Petty Trading community of Odisha, India

- Religions: Hinduism
- Languages: Odia
- Populated states: Odisha
- Population: 40,870 (1901)

Patra or Patara is a caste found in the Odisha State of India. They are also called as Kapudia some parts of odisha. both are same by culture and profession. Traditionally they are petty traders inside and outside of the village. They trade in cotton and silk yarn, vermilion, and sacred threads meant for various rites and rituals. They are also required to supply these materials to the village deity and also to the Hindu caste people of the village on various ceremonial such as religious occasions. They consider their caste symbols as Sri Mandira Dhwaja including Nilachakra, and Lord Balabhadra as community deity.

== Social life ==
There are four sub-divisions namely, Aswini Patara, Asini Patara, Gaudia Patara and Fulara Patara. They used the surnames includes; Basa, Kotual, Mohapatra, Behera, Baisakha, Guin, Patra, Paramanik, Naha, Tosh, Sahoo, Das, pal, Dalal, Hati, Nayak, Sahu etc but Basa, Mohapatra,Patra, Sahu, Behera are little bit different from other titles because they are the sebak of Lord jagannath.The Raksha Bandhan is the major festival of Patara & Kapudia community, Other than Raksha Bandhan The religious festivals like Pana Sankranti, Kanak Durga Puja and Hara Gouri Puja are also associated with the people of Patara community.

Generally women of above three patara are not wear "Nath" (Nose ring) but women of Fulara Patara wear Nath.
