= Prasanta Mohapatra =

Indian cricketer (1973–2021)

Personal information
- Full name: Prasanta Raghunath Mohapatra
- Born: 1 September 1973; Bhubaneswar, Odisha, India
- Died: 19 May 2021 (aged 47); Bhubaneswar, Odisha, India
- Source: Cricinfo, 19 May 2021

Prasanta Raghunath Mohapatra (1 September 1973 – 19 May 2021) was an Indian cricketer. He played in 45 first-class and 17 List A matches for Odisha from 1990–91 to 2002–03. He died from COVID-19.

== See also ==
- List of Odisha cricketers
