= Handa =

Handa may refer to:

== Places ==
- Handa, Aichi, Japan
- Handa, Tokushima, Japan
- Handa Island, Scotland

== Other uses ==
- Handa Opera on Sydney Harbour, open air opera productions
- Handa (surname), a Japanese surname
- Handa, a khatri (kashtriya) surname
- Handa or Katanga Cross, a copper ingot once used as currency in the Democratic Republic of the Congo
- Handa (The Twins), the twin protagonist of an Albanian folk tale

== See also ==
- Honda
