= Rupinder =

Rupinder is the first name of:

- Rupinder Gill, Canadian writer
- Rupinder Inderjit, Indian screenwriter
- Rupinder Handa, Indian singer
- Rupinder Nagra, Indian actor
- Rupinder Rupi, Indian actress
- Rupinder Pal Singh, Indian hockey player
- Rupinder Singh, Indian politician
