= Badal Patralekh =

Indian politician

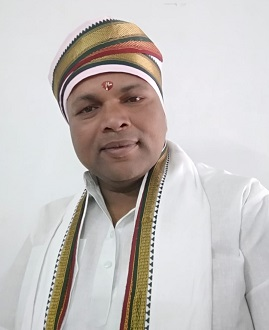

Minister for Agriculture, Animal Husbandry and Co-Operatives Government of Jharkhand
- In office 28 January 2020 – 2024
- Chief Minister: Hemant Soren
- Preceded by: Randhir Kumar Singh; BJP
- Succeeded by: Hemant Soren

Member of the Jharkhand Legislative Assembly
- In office 23 December 2019 – 23 December 2024
- Chief Minister: Hemant Soren
- Speaker: Rabindra Nath Mahato
- Succeeded by: Devendra Kunwar
- Constituency: Jarmundi
- In office 23 December 2014 – 23 December 2019
- Chief Minister: Raghubar Das
- Speaker: Dinesh Oraon
- Preceded by: Hari Narayan Ray, IND
- Constituency: Jarmundi

Personal details
- Born: Badal Patralekh Kushmaha, Sarwan, Deoghar, Bihar (Now in Jharkhand) India
- Citizenship: India
- Party: Indian National Congress
- Education: 12th Pass
- Occupation: Farmer, politician

Badal Patralekh is an Indian politician from the Congress. He was Minister for Agriculture in the Government of Jharkhand.

He was elected MLA for Jarmundi constituency, representing Congress party, in the 2014 Jharkhand Legislative Assembly election and was reelected again in 2019. He sought reelection in 2024, but lost to Devendra Kunwar by a margin of ~17,000 votes.

== Jharkhand Legislative Assembly ==
SI No.	Year	Legislative Assembly	Constituency	Margin	Party	Post
1.	2014		Jarmundi	2,708	Indian National Congress	
2.	2019		Jarmundi	3,099	Indian National Congress	Cabinet Minister
