= Odisha Naval Tata Hockey High Performance Centre =

Sports organization

Odisha Naval Tata Hockey HPC
- Headquarters: NTHA Hockey West Stand, Kalinga Stadium, Bhubaneswar
- Founders: Government of Odisha, Tata Steel & Tata Trusts (Hockey Ace foundation)
- Website: www.odisha.navaltatahockey.com
- Launched: 13 August 2019; 7 years ago

Odisha Naval Tata Hockey High Performance Centre (ONTH-HPC) is a professional field hockey institute located at Kalinga Stadium in Bhubaneswar, Odisha, India. It was launched on 13 August 2019 after Government of Odisha, Tata Steel & Tata Trusts (Hockey Ace foundation) joined hands to initiate a three-pronged program under the HPC banner of Government of Odisha. It is one of the 11 HPCs at the Kalinga Stadium which have been set up under the governance of Odisha Chief Minister Naveen Patnaik and Commissioner Cum Secy Sports Shri Vineel Krishna, who have been very influential in development of sports in the state.

The purpose of the Odisha Naval Tata Hockey HPC is to nurture the budding talent in the state, train and groom them to achieve national and international participation in order to contribute towards the Olympic Glory. It runs under the Hockey Ace Foundation (HAF) whose chairman is Chanakya Chaudhary. Former cricketer Rajiv Seth is the project director of the HPC in Bhubaneswar.

== Key details ==
Bovelander Hockey Academy, founded by former Dutch hockey star Floris Jan Bovelander, is the technical partner of Naval Tata Hockey HPC. As of 2022, there are 36 resident cadets in the boys' program and 38 resident cadets in the girls’ program. The Sports Hostels of Odisha's Sports & Youth Services Department in Panposh, Sundargarh & Bhubaneswar are the 3 Regional Development Centres of the HPC. It has also established 14 grassroots centres - 8 in Sundargarh, 2 in Sambalpur, and 1 each in Deogarh, Dhenkanal, Ganjam and Nayagarh.

== Achievements and accolades ==
In May 2022, 4 girls from the HPC were selected in India Junior Team for the Uniphar U-23 5-nation tournament which was held in Ireland from June 19–26. The Women in Blue went on to clinch silver medal in that tournament.

On 31 March 2022, the Odisha Naval Tata Hockey HPC Grassroot Boys' team defeated Uttarakhand by a margin of 31–0 to register one of the biggest wins during 32nd All India KD Singh Babu Memorial Under-14 Prize Money Hockey Tournament.

Some of the medals won by Odisha Naval Tata Hockey HPC teams in national tournaments are as follows:

Medal	Event
Bronze	1st Hockey India Junior Women Academy National Championship 2021, Bhubaneswar
Silver	1st Hockey India Sub-Junior Women Academy National Championship 2021, Bhubaneswar
Silver	1st Hockey India Sub-Junior Men Academy National Championship 2021, Bhopal
