= Rajiv Seth =

Indian cricketer (born 1968)

Personal information
- Born: 5 November 1968 (age 58); Delhi, India
- Batting: Right-handed
- Bowling: Right-arm fast medium

Domestic team information
- Years: Team
- Bengal
- Odisha

Career statistics
Competition	FC	LA
Matches	26	15
Runs scored	443	93
Batting average	19.26	10.33
100s/50s	0/0	0/1
Top score	45	52
Balls bowled	3796	705
Wickets	46	17
Bowling average	44.15	30.64
5 wickets in innings	1	0
10 wickets in match	0	0
Best bowling	5/107	3/50
Catches/stumpings	21	2/-
- Source: Cricinfo, 2 May 2022

Rajiv Seth (born 5 November 1968) is an Indian former cricketer. He played first-class cricket for Bengal and Orissa. In 2022, he was serving as the Project Director at Odisha Naval Tata Hockey High Performance Centre in Bhubaneswar, Odisha.

== See also ==
- List of Bengal cricketers
