= Jarmundi Assembly constituency =

Jarmundi
- Constituency No. 12 for the Jharkhand Legislative Assembly

Constituency details
- Country: India
- Region: East India
- State: Jharkhand
- District: Dumka
- Lok Sabha constituency: Godda
- Established: 2000
- Total electors: 2,27,038
- Reservation: None

Member of Legislative Assembly
- 5th Jharkhand Legislative Assembly
- Incumbent Devendra Kunwar
- Party: BJP
- Elected year: 2024

Jarmundi Assembly constituency is an assembly constituency in the Indian state of Jharkhand.

== Overview ==
Jarmundi Assembly constituency covers: Jarmundi Police Station in Dumka district and Sarawan Police Station in Deoghar district.

Jarmundi Assembly constituency is part of Godda (Lok Sabha constituency).

== Members of Legislative Assembly ==
| Election | Member | Party |
Bihar Legislative Assembly
Before 1957: see Poreyahat cum Jarmundi constituency
1957-62: Constituency did not exist
| 1962 | Srikant Jha | Indian National Congress |
| 1967 | S. Raut | Independent politician |
| 1969 | Srikant Jha | Indian National Congress |
| 1972 | Srikant Jha | Indian National Congress |
| 1977 | Dip Nath Rai | Independent politician |
| 1980 | Jawahar Prasad Singh | Independent politician |
| 1985 | Abhay Kant Prasad | Bharatiya Janata Party |
| 1990 | Jawahar Prasad Singh | Independent politician |
| 1995 | Devendra Kunwar | Jharkhand Mukti Morcha |
| 2000 | Devendra Kunwar | Bharatiya Janata Party |
Jharkhand Legislative Assembly
| 2005 | Hari Narayan Ray | Independent politician |
| 2009 | Hari Narayan Ray | Independent politician |
| 2014 | Badal Patralekh | Indian National Congress |
| 2019 | Badal Patralekh | Indian National Congress |
| 2024 | Devendra Kunwar | Bharatiya Janata Party |

== Election results ==
=== Assembly Election 2024 ===
2024 Jharkhand Legislative Assembly election: Jarmundi
| Party | Candidate | Votes | % | ±% |
|---|---|---|---|---|
| BJP | Devendra Kunwar | 94,892 | 48.73% | ▲18.41 |
| INC | Badal Patralekh | 77,346 | 39.72% | ▲7.49 |
| Independent | Murari Kapri | 4,635 | 2.38% | New |
| Independent | Mahendra Das | 3,210 | 1.65% | New |
| JLKM | Rajeev Kumar | 2,453 | 1.26% | New |
| BSP | Lalmohan Ray | 1,838 | 0.94% | New |
| Independent | Hanif Mian | 1,701 | 0.87% | New |
| NOTA | None of the Above | 1,472 | 0.76% | ▼0.13 |
| Margin of victory | | 17,546 | 9.01% | ▲7.11 |
| Turnout | | 1,94,742 | 71.68% | ▼0.09 |
| Registered electors | | 2,71,664 | | ▲19.66 |
| BJP gain from INC | | Swing | ▲16.50 | |

=== Assembly Election 2019 ===
2019 Jharkhand Legislative Assembly election: Jarmundi
| Party | Candidate | Votes | % | ±% |
|---|---|---|---|---|
| INC | Badal Patralekh | 52,507 | 32.22% | ▲3.40 |
| BJP | Devendra Kunwar | 49,408 | 30.32% | ▲10.68 |
| Independent | Fulkumari Devi | 17,313 | 10.62% | New |
| JVM(P) | Sanjay Kumar | 9,242 | 5.67% | ▼3.63 |
| Independent | Sita Ram Pathak | 3,989 | 2.45% | New |
| Independent | Tarni Prasad Kamat | 3,491 | 2.14% | New |
| Independent | Bishwanath Ray | 3,480 | 2.14% | New |
| NOTA | Nota | 1,449 | 0.89% | ▼0.98 |
| Margin of victory | | 3,099 | 1.90% | ▲0.13 |
| Turnout | | 1,62,951 | 71.77% | ▼1.97 |
| Registered electors | | 2,27,038 | | ▲9.72 |
| INC hold | | Swing | ▲3.40 | |

=== Assembly Election 2014 ===
2014 Jharkhand Legislative Assembly election: Jarmundi
| Party | Candidate | Votes | % | ±% |
|---|---|---|---|---|
| INC | Badal Patralekh | 43,981 | 28.82% | ▲13.36 |
| JMM | Hari Narayan Ray | 41,273 | 27.05% | ▲7.21 |
| BJP | Abhay Kant Prasad | 29,965 | 19.64% | ▲9.99 |
| JVM(P) | Devendra Kunwar | 14,189 | 9.30% | New |
| BSP | Damodar Singh | 2,948 | 1.93% | New |
| RJD | Varun Kumar | 2,797 | 1.83% | ▼1.63 |
| Independent | Parmanand Ravidas | 2,480 | 1.63% | New |
| NOTA | None of the Above | 2,847 | 1.87% | New |
| Margin of victory | | 2,708 | 1.77% | ▼7.26 |
| Turnout | | 1,52,592 | 73.74% | ▲8.85 |
| Registered electors | | 2,06,926 | | ▲15.67 |
| INC gain from Independent | | Swing | ▼0.04 | |

=== Assembly Election 2009 ===
2009 Jharkhand Legislative Assembly election: Jarmundi
| Party | Candidate | Votes | % | ±% |
|---|---|---|---|---|
| Independent | Hari Narayan Ray | 33,512 | 28.87% | New |
| JMM | Devendra Kunwar | 23,025 | 19.83% | New |
| INC | Badal Patralekh | 17,955 | 15.47% | ▲8.64 |
| BJP | Barun Kumar | 11,197 | 9.65% | ▼10.47 |
| RJD | Prabhat Kumar Singh | 4,018 | 3.46% | ▼4.60 |
| Independent | Jaydeo Mandal | 3,749 | 3.23% | New |
| Loktantrik Samata Dal | Gopal Chandra Roy | 2,505 | 2.16% | New |
| Margin of victory | | 10,487 | 9.03% | ▲3.31 |
| Turnout | | 1,16,091 | 64.89% | ▲3.51 |
| Registered electors | | 1,78,901 | | ▼0.37 |
| Independent hold | | Swing | ▲3.03 | |

=== Assembly Election 2005 ===
2005 Jharkhand Legislative Assembly election: Jarmundi
| Party | Candidate | Votes | % | ±% |
|---|---|---|---|---|
| Independent | Hari Narayan Ray | 28,480 | 25.84% | New |
| BJP | Devendra Kunwar | 22,171 | 20.12% | ▼3.33 |
| RJD | Chakradhar Yadav | 8,884 | 8.06% | ▼5.12 |
| BSP | Alamgir | 7,768 | 7.05% | ▼11.46 |
| INC | Mani Shankar | 7,524 | 6.83% | ▼7.70 |
| Independent | Hari Shankar Patralekh | 6,212 | 5.64% | New |
| LJP | Jully Yadav | 3,773 | 3.42% | New |
| Margin of victory | | 6,309 | 5.72% | ▲0.79 |
| Turnout | | 1,10,221 | 61.38% | ▼4.95 |
| Registered electors | | 1,79,564 | | ▲15.94 |
| Independent gain from BJP | | Swing | ▲2.40 | |

=== Assembly Election 2000 ===
2000 Bihar Legislative Assembly election: Jarmundi
| Party | Candidate | Votes | % | ±% |
|---|---|---|---|---|
| BJP | Dvendra Kuwar | 24,082 | 23.44% | New |
| BSP | Hari Narayan Ray | 19,009 | 18.50% | New |
| JMM | Varun Kumar | 15,344 | 14.94% | New |
| INC | Gopal Chandra Roy | 14,920 | 14.52% | New |
| RJD | Chandra Shekhar Yadav | 13,537 | 13.18% | New |
| Independent | Jawahar Prasad Singh | 12,903 | 12.56% | New |
| Independent | Ramjiwan Singh | 1,067 | 1.04% | New |
| Margin of victory | | 5,073 | 4.94% | |
| Turnout | | 1,02,731 | 67.34% | |
| Registered electors | | 1,54,880 | | |
| BJP win (new seat) | | | | |

== See also ==
- Jarmundi
- Sarwan
- List of states of India by type of legislature
