= Gourav Choudhury =

Indian cricketer (born 1999)

Personal information
- Full name: Gourav Madan Choudhury
- Born: 21 June 1999 (age 27); Indupur, Uttar Pradesh, India
- Source: ESPNcricinfo, 14 January 2021

Gourav Choudhury (born 21 June 1999) is an Indian cricketer. He made his Twenty20 debut on 14 January 2021, for Odisha in the 2020–21 Syed Mushtaq Ali Trophy. He made his List A debut on 20 February 2021, for Odisha in the 2020–21 Vijay Hazare Trophy.
