= East Coast Railway Stadium =

Cricket stadium in Bhubaneswar, Odisha, India

East Coast Railway Sports Association Stadium
- Location: Bhubaneswar, Odisha, India
- Country: India
- Coordinates: 20.322727°N 85.829117°E
- Establishment: 2008
- Capacity: 1,720
- Operator: Odisha Cricket Association
- Tenants: Odisha cricket team
- End names
- n/a

East Coast Railway Stadium is a cricket stadium in Bhubaneswar, Odisha. It hosts Ranji Trophy, and other matches.

== History ==
The present stadium was built across an area of over 22 acres at a cost of Rs 6 crore. The stadium has four turfs for practice. The drainage system is one of the best in the state. The stadium hosted its first Ranji Trophy match in November 2008.

A few Twenty20 matches during the first edition of the Odisha Premier League were also hosted at this venue.

A huge manual scoreboard has been put up for the first time for Odisha versus Karnataka Ranji Trophy match.

In 2010, Bhubaneswar Stadium was put to use during the Orissa-Punjab Elite Group B Ranji Trophy tournament league match was played. General Manager of East Coast Railway AK Vohra inaugurated the match. Former Australian cricketer and Odisha coach Michael Bevan was also present.
