= Sushil Kumar Prasad =

Indian cricketer (born 1959)

Personal information
- Born: 12 August 1959 (age 67); Delhi, India
- Source: Cricinfo, 10 April 2016

Sushil Kumar Prasad (born 12 August 1959) is an Indian former cricketer. He played first-class cricket for Delhi and Orissa between 1982 and 1996.

== See also ==
- List of Delhi cricketers
