= Devendra Kunwar (politician) =

Indian politician

Devendra Kunwar (born 1958) is an Indian politician from Jharkhand. He is an MLA from Jarmundi Assembly constituency in Dumka District. He won the 2024 Jharkhand Legislative Assembly election, representing the Bharatiya Janata Party.

== Early life and education ==
Kunwar is from Jarmundi, Dumka District, Jharkhand. He is the son of late Hari Prasad Kunwar. He passed Class 10 in 1972 at Rani Sonawatee Kumari High School, Nonihat.

== Career ==
Kunwar won from Jarmundi Assembly constituency representing Bharatiya Janata Party in the 2024 Jharkhand Legislative Assembly election. He polled 94,892 votes and defeated his nearest rival, Badal Patralekh of the Indian National Congress, by a margin of 17,546 votes. He was first elected as an MLA winning the 1995 Bihar Legislative Assembly election representing JMM. He retained the seat for a second time winning the 2000 Bihar Legislative Assembly election but on the Bharatiya Janata Party ticket. Later, Jharkhand become a state but he could not win the next four elections in 2005, 2009, 2014 and 2019. He lost the 2019 Jharkhand Legislative Assembly election to Badal Patralekh of the Indian National Congress by a margin of 3,099 votes. However, he regained the seat after a long gap and won the 2024 Assembly election on BJP ticket.
