= Pravanjan Mullick =

Indian cricketer

Personal information
- Full name: Pravanjan Madhabnanda Mullick
- Born: 12 September 1976 (age 50); Bhubaneswar, Odisha, India
- Batting: Right-handed
- Bowling: Right-arm medium
- Role: Batsman

Domestic team information
- Years: Team
- 1996/97–2010/11: Odisha

Career statistics
Competition	FC	LA
Matches	88	56
Runs scored	5818	1156
Batting average	47.30	28.19
100s/50s	18/27	0/7
Top score	207*	99
Balls bowled	2,975	840
Wickets	30	22
Bowling average	43.43	39.62
5 wickets in innings	0	0
10 wickets in match	0	0
Best bowling	3/45	2/24
Catches/stumpings	64/-	25/-
- Source: Cricinfo, 16 November 2024

Pravanjan Madhabnanda Mullick (born 12 September 1976 in Bhubaneswar), is an Indian first class cricketer for Odisha. A right-handed batsman, he captained the state side, and has made over 5,000 runs at an average of above 50. He has twice scored a hundred in each innings of a match, the only Odisha player to have done so.

Mullick was a professional for the Northern Irish club Fox Lodge and also played in the Scottish league. He retired from first-class cricket a few seasons back, but still plays for the Katak Tigers in the Odisha Premier League.
