= Shivam Chauhan =

Indian cricketer (born 1997)

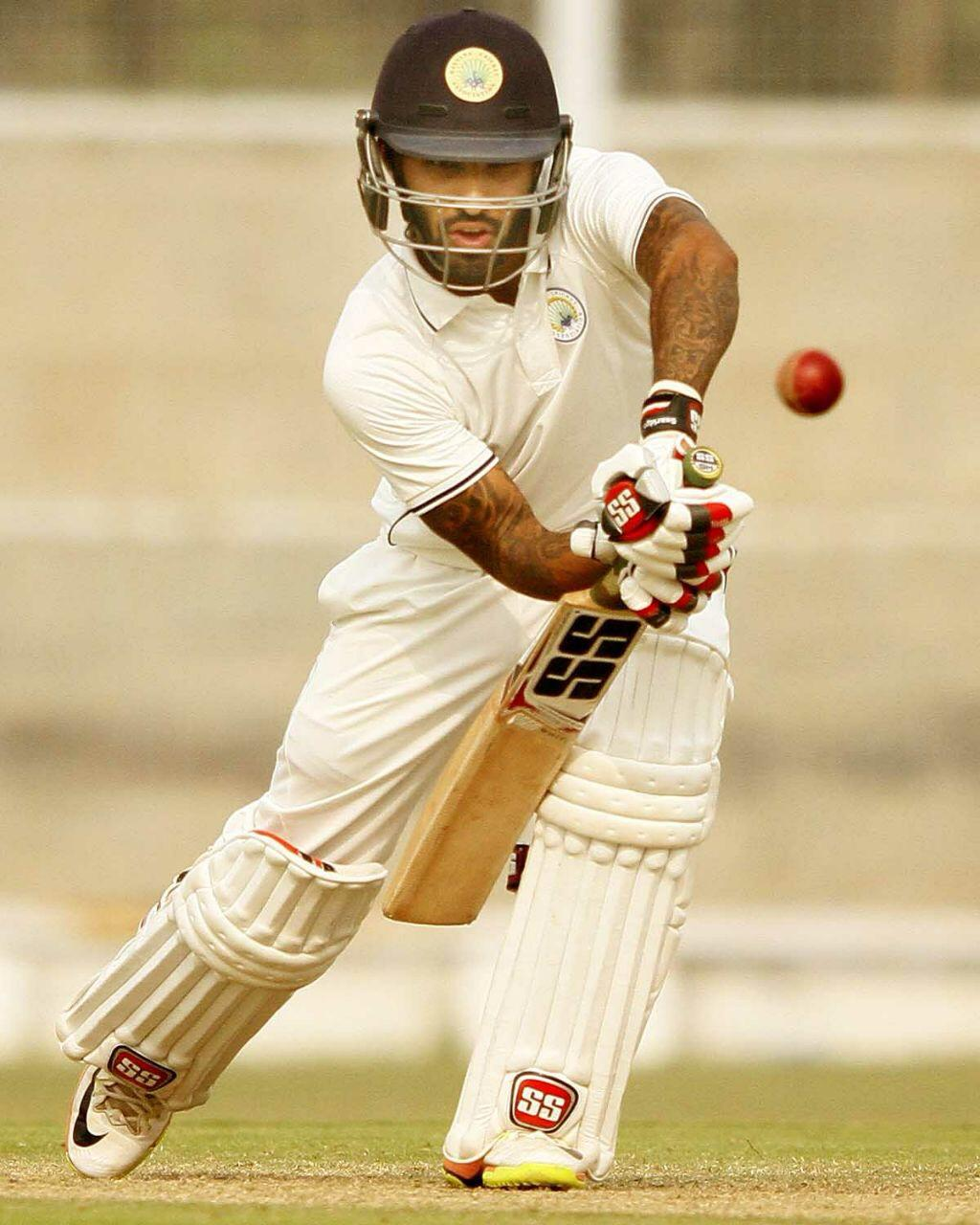
- Shivam Chauhan Ranji Batting in 2019

Personal information
- Full name: Shivam Chauhan
- Born: 14 October 1997 (age 29); Saharanpur, Uttar Pradesh, India
- Nickname: Shivy JR.
- Batting: Right-handed
- Bowling: Right-arm medium

Domestic team information
- Years: Team
- 2016–Present: Haryana
- 2021–2022: Prestwich CC
- 2019–2021: Blackpool CC
- 2024-Present: Dosti CC
- Source: ESPNcricinfo, 13 November 2016

Shivam Chauhan (born 14 October 1997) is an Indian cricketer. He made his first-class debut for Haryana in the 2016–17 Ranji Trophy on 13 November 2016. He made his Twenty20 debut for Haryana in the 2016–17 Inter State Twenty-20 Tournament on 29 January 2017. He made his List A debut for Haryana in the 2016–17 Vijay Hazare Trophy on 25 February 2017.

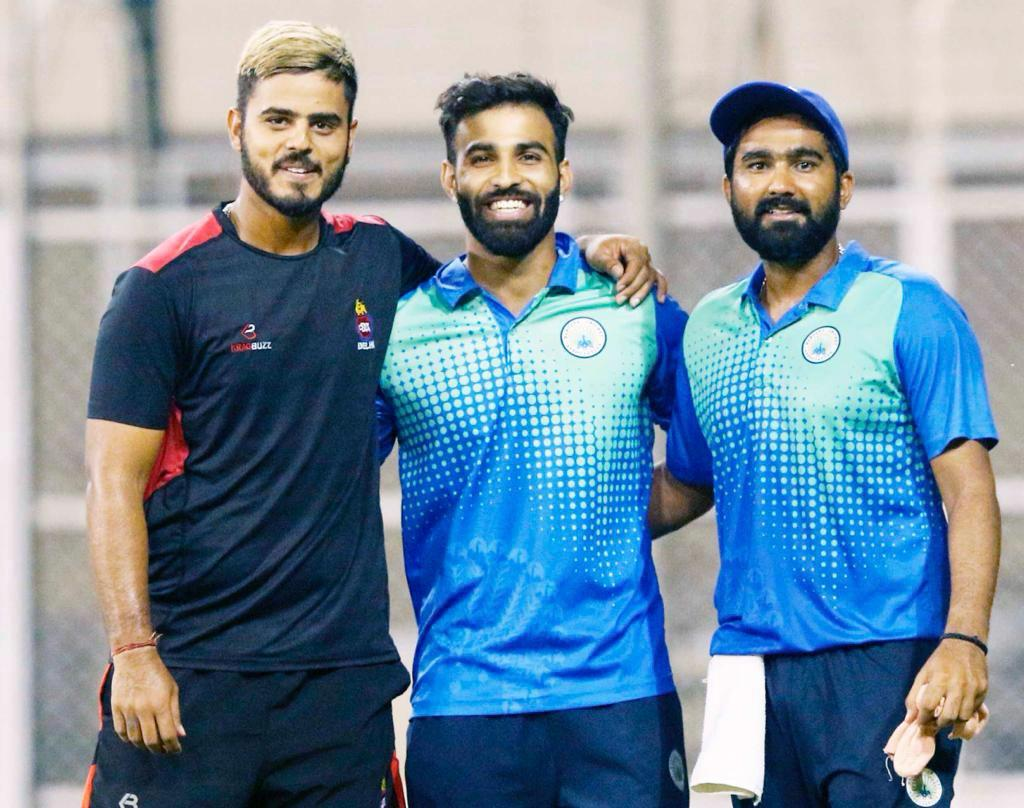
Shivam Chauhan, Nitesh Rana and Rahul Tewatia, Training during Season

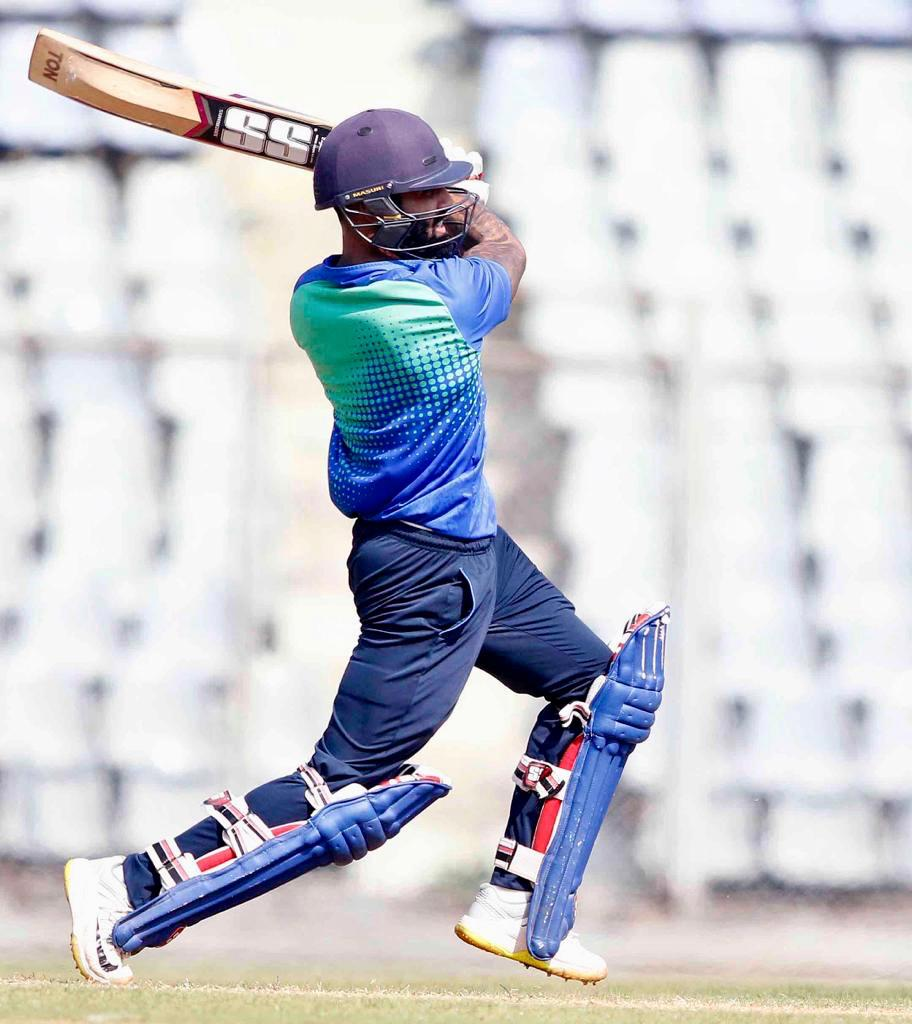
Shivam Chauhan Syed Mushtaq Ali Batting, becoming top 10 run scorers in the league
