= Saurabh Dubey (Uttar Pradesh cricketer) =

Indian cricketer (born 1988)

Personal information
- Full name: Saurabh Dubey
- Born: 1 December 1988 (age 37); Gorakhpur, India
- Source: Cricinfo, 20 November 2016

Saurabh Dubey (born 1 December 1988) is an Indian cricketer. He made his Twenty20 debut for Uttar Pradesh in the 2015–16 Syed Mushtaq Ali Trophy on 2 January 2016.
