= Subrat Sahoo =

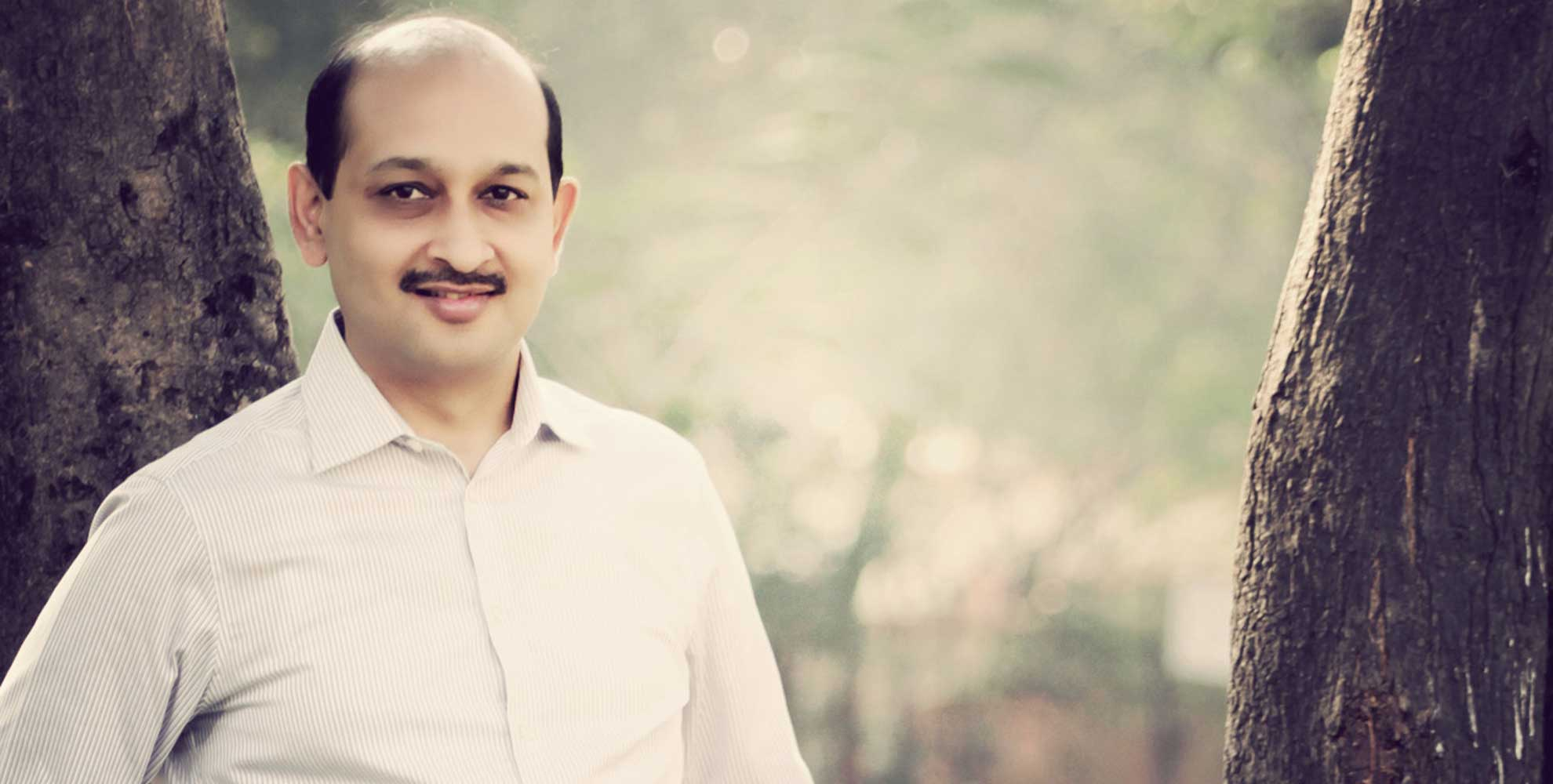
- Born: July 5, 1968 (age 57); Odisha
- Occupations: Indian Administrative Service officer, writer
- Years active: 1992 - present

Subrat Sahoo (born 5 July 1968) is an Indian Administrative Service officer of Chhattisgarh Cadre and science fiction writer. His allotment year is 1992.Presently he is posted as Chief Electoral Officer for the state of Chhattisgarh |, under deputation to the Election Commission of India. His responsibilities include conducting the general elections to the legislative assembly and to the Lok Sabha, the Lower House of the Indian Parliament.

== Career ==
Subrat Sahoo is currently giving his services as Chief Electoral Officer of the state of Chhattisgarh, Election Commission of India. As Chief Electoral Officer, he has recently successfully conducted the general elections to the legislative assembly of the state of Chhattisgarh. In the most peaceful elections in the state in the last couple of decades, this elections held in October–December 2018 witnessed no poll-related violence or aberrations, no repolls for the first time in the state's history, and no loss of life during the polling. Voting turnout in the rural and extremism-affected areas increased substantially. He was honoured by the President of India on January 25, 2019, for his achievements in the field of election management and administrative innovations in the field of elections in the state, as well as for conducting the most peaceful elections here. He has served important posts such as District Collector in the Districts: Durg, Dhamtari & Sarguja. He has also been Commissioner of Bilaspur Division, Chhattisgarh. His services have also been marked in Tourism Department, Sports Department, Tribal Welfare Department, Social Welfare Department, Women & Child Development Department, Food & Civil Supplies Department & Culture Department, Department of School Education & Literacy, Health and Medical Education. He has been Managing Director of The Civil Supplies Corporation, Marketing Federation, State Warehousing Corporation, Chairman and MD of the Apex Bank, MD of the Tourism Board, among others.

Subrat Sahoo writes for Documentaries & Short Films as well. He was responsible for creating a video awareness campaign for tourism in Chhattisgarh based on local icons. He is the holder of several Golden Book of World Records, including one for largest coverage of immunization in one day, for largest coverage of adolescent girls under a menstrual hygiene awareness campaign in a single day, and a Limca Book of Records for the largest number of beneficiaries covered in a single day under the government sponsored mass marriage of eligible BPL couples. His science fiction book *Future Past*, a collection of sci-fi short stories with twist in each tale, was published in December 2014.

He is scheduled to address the India Conclave at Harvard in mid-February 2019, regarding his administrative experience during the Chhattisgarh assembly elections.
