= Dinabandhu Sahoo =

Indian botanist (born 1961)

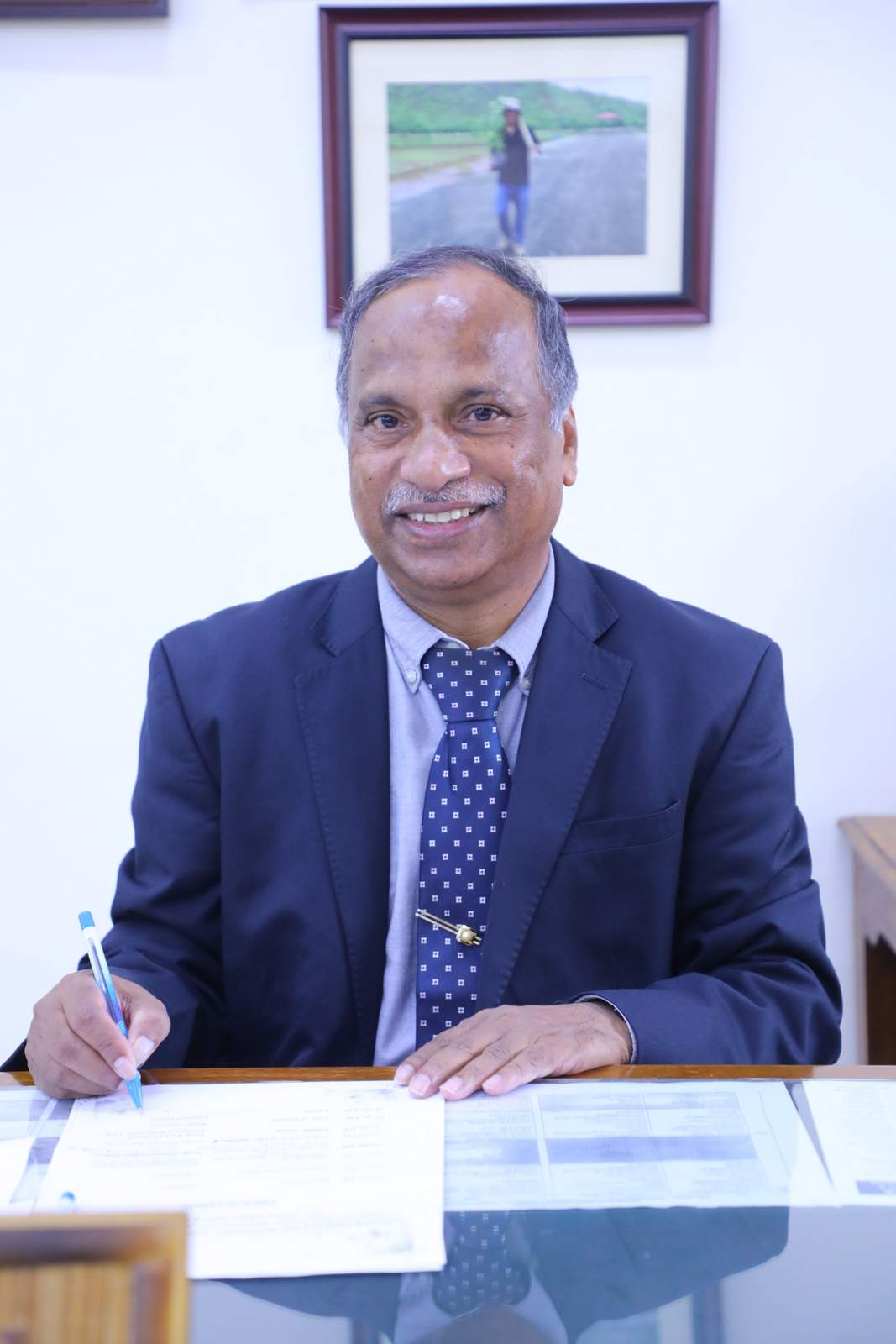
- Born: 9 October 1961 (age 64); Puri district, Odisha, India
- Education: Utkal University; University of Delhi
- Scientific career
- Fields: Botany, marine biology, sustainable development
- Workplaces: University of Delhi

Dinabandhu Sahoo (born 9 October 1961) is an Indian botanist, professor, and head of the Department of Botany at the University of Delhi.

He is an elected fellow of the National Academy of Sciences, India (FNASc) and the National Academy of Agricultural Sciences (FNAAS).

== Early life and education ==
Dinabandhu Sahoo was born on 9 October 1961 in the Puri district of Odisha, India. In 1981 he completed a Bachelor of Science degree with honours in botany at Utkal University. He further studied botany at the University of Delhi, completing a Master of Science degree in 1983, Master of Philosophy in 1985, and Ph.D. in 1989. He participated in the 7th Indian Scientific Expedition to Antarctica as a student during 1987 and 1988.

== Career ==
Sahoo was a visiting fellow at the Smithsonian Institution in 1992, at Kochi University from 1999 to 2000, and at the University of Connecticut in 2002. He worked at the University of Delhi as an assistant professor from 1997 to 1998 and as an associate professor from 1998 to 2006, becoming a full professor in 2007. He served as the chairman of Kalindi College from 2013 to 2014 and was appointed as director of the Institute of Bioresources and Sustainable Development (IBSD) in 2014. In 2020 he was appointed vice-chancellor of Fakir Mohan University in Odisha.

He has also served as scientific adviser to the Chief Minister of Meghalaya (2019–2024) and as an adviser on higher education and climate change to the Government of Manipur.

== Publications and awards ==
Sahoo is credited with authoring 13 books and multiple research papers in botany and sustainability. He holds an honorary Doctor of Science (D.Sc.).

== Honours ==
Sahoo became a fellow of the The National Academy of Sciences, India and an honorary fellow of the Biotech Research Society of India in 2017. He was elected as a fellow of the National Academy of Agricultural Sciences in 2019.

Two plant species discovered by other researchers have been named in Sahoo's honour:

- Prunus dinabandhuana, a species of tree from Manipur described in 2022.
- Caulokaempferia dinabandhuensis, a species of ginger from Manipur described in 2017. C. dinabandhuensis is now considered a heterotypic synonym of Caulokaempferia suksathanii.
