= Rishikesh Das =

Indian cricketer (born 1991)

Personal information
- Full name: Rishikesh Rashmi Das
- Born: 6 December 1991 (age 34); Odisha, India
- Source: ESPNcricinfo, 20 November 2016

Rishikesh Das (born 6 December 1991) is an Indian cricketer. He made his Twenty20 debut for Odisha in the 2015–16 Syed Mushtaq Ali Trophy on 4 January 2016.
