= Devendra Kunwar (cricketer) =

Indian cricketer (born 1995)

Personal information
- Born: 2 December 1995 (age 30); Bargarh, Odisha, India
- Source: ESPNcricinfo, 3 February 2017

Devendra Kunwar (born 2 December 1995) is an Indian cricketer. He made his Twenty20 debut for Odisha in the 2016–17 Inter State Twenty-20 Tournament on 3 February 2017.
