= Gaurav Khatri =

Indian cricketer (born 1991)

Personal information
- Born: 30 December 1991 (age 34)
- Source: ESPNcricinfo, 4 March 2017

Gaurav Khatri (born 30 December 1991) is an Indian cricketer. He made his List A debut for Railways in the 2016–17 Vijay Hazare Trophy on 1 March 2017.
