= Hitesh Kadam =

Indian cricketer (born 1988)

Personal information
- Full name: Hitesh Gajanan Kadam
- Born: 5 October 1988 (age 38); Mumbai, India

Domestic team information
- Years: Team
- Railways
- Source: ESPNcricinfo, 11 October 2015

Hitesh Kadam (born 5 October 1988) is an Indian first-class cricketer who plays for Railways. He made his List A debut for Railways in the 2016–17 Vijay Hazare Trophy on 25 February 2017. He made his Twenty20 debut for Railways in the 2017–18 Zonal T20 League on 10 January 2018.
