= Manoj Barik =

Indian cricketer (born 1989)

Personal information
- Full name: Manoj Kumar Barik
- Born: 12 June 1989 (age 37); Bhubaneswar, India
- Source: ESPNcricinfo, 20 November 2016

Manoj Barik (born 12 June 1989) is an Indian cricketer. He made his Twenty20 debut for Odisha in the 2015–16 Syed Mushtaq Ali Trophy on 4 January 2016.
