= Malika Handa =

Indian chess player (born 1995)

Personal information
- Born: 20 March 1995 (age 31) Jalandhar, Punjab, India

Chess career
- Country: India
- Peak rating: 1607 (March 2024)

Malika Handa (born 20 March 1995) is a deaf Indian professional chess player and the first Indian woman to win a gold medal in the International Deaf Chess Championship. She has won two gold medals in the World Deaf Open Chess Championship and Asian Women Deaf Championship, as well as four silver medals in the World Deaf Blitz Chess Championship in 2018 and Asian Disabled Chess Championship in 2017. She has won the National Chess Championship of the Deaf eight times.

Handa was a national awardee for best sportsperson in 2019. She was a National Youth Awardee in 2019–2020, and awarded on 16 January 2023 by the Government of India.

== Early life ==
Malika was born in Jalandhar, Punjab, to Suresh and Renu Handa. She was not born deaf but lost her hearing and speech when she was one year old. She lives with a 84%

per cent hearing disability. She was introduced to chess in 2010 by her father when he brought home a chessboard. Her chess expertise helped her secure a seat in a mainstream college.

== Professional life ==
Handa began to play chess when she was 15 years. She has won the national deaf chess championship six times. She has faced a lot of problems in her professional life; the biggest problem was the lack of aid from government. In the past nine years of playing, she has won more titles than those who have been playing for longer. She is the only woman from Punjab to have represented the state nine times in national championships. She has won one gold and two silvers in world deaf chess championship and as well as in Asian deaf chess championship.

== Medals ==
=== International medals ===
- Silver - ICCD World Deaf Blitz Chess Championship (2018)
- Silver - Asian Chess Championship for Disabled (2017)
- Gold - ICCD World Open Individual Deaf Chess Championship (2016)
- Silver - ICCD 4th World Individual Blitz Deaf Championship (Ladies) (2016)
- Gold - ICCD 3rd Asian Individual Chess Championship for Deaf (2015)
- Silver - ICCD 1st Asian Open Deaf Chess Blitz Championship (2015)

=== National medals ===
- Gold - 23nd National Chess Championship of the Deaf (2022)
- Gold - 22nd National Chess Championship of the Deaf (2020)
- Gold - 21st National Chess Championship of the Deaf (2018)
- Gold - 20th National Chess Championship of the Deaf (2017)
- Gold - 19th National Chess Championship of the Deaf (2017)
- Gold - 18th National Chess Championship of the Deaf (2016)
- Gold - 17th National Chess Championship of the Deaf (2013)
- Gold - National Chess Championship of the Deaf (2012)
