= Paresh Patel (cricketer) =

Indian cricketer (born 1985)

Personal information
- Born: 18 September 1985 (age 41); Bhubaneswar, Odisha, India
- Source: ESPNcricinfo, 29 January 2017

Paresh Patel (born 18 September 1985) is an Indian cricketer. He made his first-class debut for Odisha in the 2005–06 Ranji Trophy on 23 November 2005.
