= Subhrajit Sahoo =

Indian cricketer (born 1988)

Personal information
- Full name: Subhrajit Dayanidhi Sahoo
- Born: 12 November 1988 (age 38); Paradip, Orissa, India
- Batting: Right-handed
- Source: Cricinfo, 6 June 2018

Subhrajit Sahoo (born 12 November 1988) is an Indian cricketer. He played the different formats of First-class cricket, List A cricket and T20 for the Orissa cricket team from 2009 to 2015.
