= Akash Yadav =

Indian cricketer (born 1993)

Personal information
- Born: 31 December 1993 (age 32); New Delhi, India
- Batting: Left-handed
- Role: Wicketkeeper

Domestic team information
- Years: Team
- 2016–17: Railways
- Source: ESPNcricinfo, 4 March 2017

Aakash Yadav (born 31 December 1993) is an Indian cricketer. He made his List A debut for Railways in the 2016–17 Vijay Hazare Trophy on 1 March 2017.
