= Indupur =

- Location within Uttar Pradesh
- Coordinates: 26.5588°N 83.6586°E
- Country: India
- State: Uttar Pradesh
- District: Deoria

Area
  - Total: 3.93 km^{2} (1.52 sq mi)
- Elevation: 84 m (276 ft)

Population (2011)
  - Total: 3,370
  - Density: 994/km^{2} (2,570/sq mi)

Languages
  - Official: Hindi
- Time zone: UTC+5:30 (IST)

Indupur is a village in the district of Deoria in Uttar Pradesh, India.

== Economy ==
Approximately 30% of Indupur's population is employed. Approximately 60% of those employed work in agriculture, 24% work in trade and commerce, 10% work in both agriculture and trade and commerce, 10% work in other services, 6% work in transport and communication, 8% work in construction, and 2% are marginal workers (working for less than half of the year).

== Demographics ==
Religions in Indupur
Religion	Percent
Hindus	90%
Muslims	10%
Others†	0%
Distribution of religions †Includes Sikhs (0%), Buddhists (0%), Christians (0%), Jains (0%).

According to provisional data from the 2011 census, the Indupur had a population of 3,370 with 1,703 men and 1,667 women.
