= Rajkishan Patel =

Indian cricketer (born 1997)

Personal information
- Born: 30 April 1997 (age 29); Sundargarh, Odisha, India
- Source: Cricinfo, 3 March 2017

Rajkishan Patel (born 30 April 1997) is an Indian cricketer. He made his List A debut for Odisha in the 2016–17 Vijay Hazare Trophy on 3 March 2017.
