= Haji Iqbal =

Indian politician

Haji Iqbal is an Indian politician member of the Uttar Pradesh Legislative Council since 2009 to 2015 constituency Saharanpur district representing Bahujan Samaj Party and CEO and manager of Glocal University
