= Akash Verma =

Indian cricketer (born 1990)

Personal information
- Born: 28 November 1990 (age 35); Kanpur, Uttar Pradesh, India
- Source: ESPNcricinfo, 22 November 2016

Akash Verma (born 28 November 1990) is an Indian first-class cricketer who plays for Jharkhand. He made his first-class debut for Jharkhand in the 2010–11 Ranji Trophy on 1 December 2010.
