= Rupinder Handa =

Punjabi singer

- Born: 30 September
- Occupation: Singer actor performer
- Years active: 2006–present
- Known for: Winner of Awaaz Punjab Di, the first singing reality show in Punjab (2005-06)
- Notable work: Awarded by Haryana Government as FOLK SINGER OF HARYANA By chief Minister Of Haryana Mr Mahohar Lal Khattar in 2017

Rupinder Handa is an Indian playback singer. She has released four albums, including Return Of Rupinder Handa and singles including "Pind De Gerhe".

== Discography ==
=== Albums ===
Year	Album title
2006	Mere Haniyan
2009	Fulkarian
2012	Loving Waves
2013	Return Of Rupinder Handa

=== Singles ===
Year	Album title
2014	Punjab
2014	Ghaint Sardar
2015	Mera Sardar
2015	Mere Wala Jatt
2015	Pind De Gerhe
2015	Close To Heart
2016	Roki Na
2016	Takhatposh
2016	Intezaar
2016	Tor Da Craze
2017	Sardar Te Mardi
2017	Sajna ve
2017	Stand
2017	Tasveeran
2018	Jodiyan
2018	Stay Away
2018	Cheatingan
2018	Dadi De Laal
2018	Parwah Ni Karidi
2018	Queen Of Sardar
2019	Careless Chan
2019	Bach Ke Reh
2019	Khabardar
2020	Dark Circle
2020	38 Bore
2020	Danger Eye
2020	Modikhana
2020	Pecha Delhi Nal
2020	Hallasheri
2021	26 Nu Delhi
2021	Ride
2021	Forehead
2021	Dharkan
2026	Kali Activa 2

=== Film soundtracks ===
Year	Album title	Song
2013	Sikander	Sahan De Vich
2013	Sikander	Sadhi Vari
2014	47 To 87	Garwa
2018	Punjab Singh	Ek Teri Naa Ton
2019	Mitti	Jeeni Tere Nal
