= Sourajit Mohapatra =

Indian cricketer (born 1968)

Suraj Mahapatra
Personal information
- Full name: Sourajit Mohapatra
- Born: 7 September 1968 (age 58); Cuttack, Orissa, India
- Batting: Left-handed
- Bowling: Right-arm Medium
- Role: Bowler

Domestic team information
- Years: Team
- 1985–1993: Orissa

Career statistics
Competition	FC	List A
Matches	28	1
Runs scored	269	-
Batting average	12.80	-
100s/50s	0/0	0/0
Top score	40	-
Balls bowled	5235	54
Wickets	100	0
Bowling average	31.02	-
5 wickets in innings	7	0
10 wickets in match	1	0
Best bowling	7/40	-
Catches/stumpings	3/–	-/–
- Source: Cricinfo, 25 October 2016

Sourajit Mohapatra (born 7 September 1968) is a first-class cricketer who played for Orissa in the Ranji Trophy. He was born in Cuttack, Orissa, India.

Mani is a left-hand batsman and right-arm medium bowler. He took a hat-trick in the 1987-88 Ranji Trophy playing for Orissa against Tripura.

== Teams ==
Ranji Trophy: Orissa

== See also ==
- List of hat-tricks in the Ranji Trophy
