= Mohit Handa =

Indian cricketer (born 1993)

Personal information
- Born: 17 November 1993 (age 32); Amritsar, India
- Batting: Right handed
- Role: Wicketkeeper

Domestic team information
- Years: Team
- 2016–17: Punjab
- Source: ESPNcricinfo, 4 March 2017

Mohit Handa (born 17 November 1993) is an Indian cricketer. He made his List A debut for Punjab in the 2016–17 Vijay Hazare Trophy on 1 March 2017.
