= Tukuna Sahoo =

Indian cricketer (born 1987)

Personal information
- Full name: Tukuna Ganapati Sahoo
- Born: 7 January 1987 (age 39); Bhubaneswar, Odisha, India
- Source: ESPNcricinfo, 20 November 2016

Tukuna Sahoo (born 7 January 1987) is an Indian cricketer. He made his Twenty20 debut for Odisha in the 2015–16 Syed Mushtaq Ali Trophy on 2 January 2016.
