= Govinda Poddar =

Indian cricketer

Personal information
- Full name: Govinda Bhaktiranjan Poddar
- Born: 9 September 1991 (age 35); Rourkela, Odisha, India
- Nickname: Uttam
- Height: 1.78 m (5 ft 10 in)
- Batting: Right-handed
- Bowling: Right-arm off break

Domestic team information
- Years: Team
- 2009–present: Odisha, Eastzone, India Red, India A, Board President XI, CAG India, Odisha Pro T20 League

Career statistics
Competition	FC	LA	T20
Matches	89	67	56
Runs scored	4,359	1,942	1342
Batting average	31.13	32.91	27.38
100s/50s	9/20	3/12	0/8
Top score	225	136	64
Balls bowled	6,112	1,582	483
Wickets	65	28	24
Bowling average	54.03	40.64	24.79
5 wickets in innings	2	0	0
10 wickets in match	0	0	0
Best bowling	7/102	4/27	3/7
Catches/stumpings	61/–	21/–	233/–
- Source: ESPNcricinfo, 10 December 2024

Govinda Bhaktiranjan Poddar (born 9 September 1991) is an Indian cricketer. Poddar is a right-handed batsman who also bowls right-arm off break. He has played first-class and List A cricket for Odisha, East Zone and India A. Govinda Poddar is one of those rare cricketers to have scored a hundred on his first class debut. It happened against Baroda in November 2010. And List A debut against Tripura in 2009. Since then he has been a regular in the Odisha Ranji Trophy side. He is very prolific and consistent batsman throughout and across all format for Odisha. This man from Rourkela (Sundergarh) was handed over the captaincy for the shorter formats at the start of 2016 and then took over captaincy for the 2016-17 Ranji season. Odisha had a dream run as they made it to the quarter-finals of the tourney after 15 years. He represented India Red after scoring tons of run in Vijay Hazare trophy 2016–17. He also represented India Board President XI against Australia.

He was the leading run-scorer for Odisha for several years starting from 2011 and continuing across all the format. Eye catching in the year 2016–17 Vijay Hazare Trophy, with 359 runs in six matches. He was ranked 8 in the top 10 list of highest runs scorer of India in Vijay Hazare trophy 2016–17. Now he is married to his nursery schoolmate childhood friend and his long time lover Bandita Sahu. He is serving his duty as Captain of Odisha Cricket (Ranji trophy and Syed Mustaq Ali trophy 2024-2025).
