= Odisha cricket team =

Indian cricket team

Personnel
- Captain: Subhranshu Senapati (FC); Biplab Samantray (LA & T20)
- Coach: Dinesh Mongia
- Owner: Odisha Cricket Association

Team information
- Founded: 1949
- Home ground: Barabati Stadium
- Capacity: 48,000
- Secondary home ground: DRIEMS Ground

History
- First-class debut: Bihar in 1949 at Keenan Stadium, Jamshedpur
- Ranji Trophy wins: 0
- Vijay Hazare Trophy wins: 0
- Syed Mushtaq Ali Trophy wins: 0
- Official website: OCA

The Odisha cricket team (known as Orissa until 2011) is a domestic cricket team based in the Indian state of Odisha. It is in the elite group of the Ranji Trophy.

Its main home ground is Barabati Stadium in Cuttack. Home matches are also played at DRIEMS Ground in Cuttack, East Coast Railway Stadium and KIIT Cricket Stadium in Bhubaneswar, and Veer Surendra Sai Stadium in Sambalpur. The Odisha cricket team is selected and governed by the Odisha Cricket Association (OCA).

== History ==
Odisha first competed at first-class level in the 1949–50 Ranji Trophy, when they lost to Bihar by 356 runs. Their first victory came in 1952–53, when they defeated Assam by an innings and 139 runs. They played only against other East Zone teams (Bihar, Assam and Bengal) until 1983–84, when they progressed to the Ranji Trophy quarter-finals for the first time.

Odisha's best performance in the Ranji Trophy came in the 2000–01 season, when they made their only semi-final appearance till date. The match was drawn but Baroda won on first innings.

The team's recent best performance in the Ranji Trophy was managing to advance to the quarter-final stage in both the 2016–17 and 2019–20 seasons. They lost there to the eventual champions Gujarat and Bengal respectively, under the captaincy of Govinda Poddar in 2016–17 and Subhranshu Senapati 2019–20.

== Competitive record ==
At the completion of the 2022–23 season, Odisha had played 325 Ranji Trophy matches. They had won 74, lost 115 and drawn 136 matches with 1 match abandoned.

== Past and present players ==
Players capped for Odisha who have played International Cricket, along with year of debut:

- Debashish Mohanty (1997)
- Sanjay Raul (1998)
- Shiv Sunder Das (2000)
- Anshuman Rath (2014) (International caps for Hong Kong)

Prominent players at the domestic level:

- Sasanka Patnaik (1949–1965)
- Banabasi Patnaik (1949–1965)
- Nyayapathy Swamy (1956–1976)
- Bisuddhananda Jena (1957–1970)
- Harmohan Praharaj (1978–1991)
- Asjit Jaiprakasham (1980–1992)
- Rashmi Parida (1995–2007)
- Pravanjan Mullick (1996–2010)
- Pinninti Jayachandra (1996–2008)
- Sanjay Satpathy (1997–2007)
- Natraj Behera (2000–2014)
- Basant Mohanty (2007–2023)
- Govinda Poddar (2009–present)
- Biplab Samantray (2009–present)
- Deepak Behera (2009–2019)
- Suryakant Pradhan (2013–2024)
- Subhranshu Senapati (2016–present)

== Squad ==
Players with international caps are listed in bold.

Name	Birth date	Batting style	Bowling style	Notes
Batsmen
Swastik Samal	27 July 2000 (age 26)	Right-hand bat	Right-arm leg break	
Subhranshu Senapati	30 December 1996 (age 29)	Right-hand bat	Right-arm medium	First-class Captain
Sandeep Pattnaik	17 May 1998 (age 28)	Right-hand bat	Right-arm off break	
Gourav Choudhury	21 June 1999 (age 27)	Right-hand bat	Right-arm medium	
Om Munde	16 June 2003 (age 23)	Right-hand bat	Right-arm leg break	
Anil Parida	27 December 2000 (age 25)	Right-hand bat		
Shantanu Mishra	30 May 1994 (age 32)	Right-hand bat	Right-arm off break	
Subham Satrujit	12 September 1999 (age 27)	Right-hand bat	Right-arm medium	
Aditya Rout	27 October 2003 (age 23)	Right-hand bat	Right-arm medium	
All-rounders
Sambit Baral	4 September 2002 (age 24)	Right-hand bat	Right-arm medium	
Govinda Poddar	9 September 1991 (age 35)	Right-hand bat	Right-arm off break	
Biplab Samantray	14 December 1988 (age 37)	Right-hand bat	Right-arm medium	List A and Twenty20 Captain
Prayash Singh	2 February 1994 (age 32)	Right-hand bat	Right-arm medium	
Soumya Lenka	18 August 2003 (age 23)	Right-hand bat	Right-arm medium	
Ninad Rathva	10 March 1999 (age 27)	Left-handed	Slow left-arm orthodox	
Wicket-keepers
Aasirwad Swain	3 March 2005 (age 21)	Right-hand bat		
Rajesh Dhuper	2 December 1999 (age 26)	Right-hand bat		
Sourav Gouda	21 September 1998 (age 28)	Right-hand bat		
Spin bowlers
Sayed Tugayl Ahmad	29 October 2007 (age 19)	Right-hand bat	Slow left-arm orthodox	
Pappu Roy	23 February 1995 (age 31)	Left-hand bat	Slow left-arm orthodox	
Pace bowlers
Rajesh Mohanty	20 May 2000 (age 26)	Right-hand bat	Right-arm medium	
Badal Biswal	2 August 2004 (age 22)	Right-hand bat	Right-arm medium	
Debabrata Pradhan	10 October 1996 (age 30)	Right-hand bat	Right-arm medium	
Vageesh Sharma	3 October 1998 (age 28)	Right-hand bat	Right-arm medium	
Lalit Yadav	17 December 1995 (age 30)	Right-hand bat	Right-arm medium	

Updated as on 26 October 2026

== Coaches ==
Coaches in Odisha cricket team are listed below:

- Debashish Mohanty
- Shiv Sunder Das
- Sanjay Raul
- Ranjib Biswal
- Sanjay Kumar Satapathy
- Subit Biswal
- Michael Bevan
- Balvinder Sandhu
- Sourajit Mohapatra
- Abakash Khatua
- Wasim Jaffer
- Dinesh Mongia

== Records ==
For more details on this topic, see List of Odisha first-class cricket records, List of Odisha List A cricket records, List of Odisha Twenty20 cricket records.
