= List of Kerala cricketers =

This is a list of cricketers who have played first-class, List A or Twenty20 cricket for Kerala cricket team previously known as Travancore-Cochin cricket team.

Seasons given are first and last seasons; the player did not necessarily play in all the intervening seasons. Players in bold have played international cricket.

== A ==
- Leslie Aaron, 1958/59
- Sandy Aaron, 1957/58
- K. N. Ananthapadmanabhan, 1988/89–2004/05
- KM Asif, 2018–present
- KC Akshay, 2017–present
- Mohammed Azharuddeen, 2015–present
- Iqbal Abdulla, 2016–17
- Fabid Ahmed
- Athif Bin Ashraf
- Mohan Akshaya
- Perumparambath Anthaf
- Sadanandan Anish
- P. M. Anandan
- Pallam Anfal
- Paliath Ravi Achan 1952–69
- Sajeevan Akhil

== B ==
- Sachin Baby
- C. K. Bhaskaran
- Nedumankuzhy Basil
- Acharath Babu

== C ==
- Akshay Chandran
- **Krishna Chandran**
- Sony Cheruvathur
- Prasanth Chandran

== D ==
- Kunal Datta, 1959/60
- Ivan D'Cruz, 1970/71
- Sankara Dendapani
- Varghese Daniel
- Jono Dean
- Hari Devarajan
- CM Deepak

== F ==
- Daryl Ferrario
- Fazil Fanoos
- Robert Fernandez
- Ahmed Farzeen
- Faisal Fanoos

== G ==
- Suri Gopalakrishna, 1967/68 to 1974–75
- Raiphi Gomez
- Vathsal Govind
- Velayudhan Govindan
- A. P. M. Gopalakrishnan
- Rojith Ganesh, 2021–present

== H ==
- Abhishek Hegde
- Vedam Hariharan

== J ==
- K Jayaraman, 1977/89
- Sijomon Joseph
- VA Jagadeesh
- Jafar Jamal

== K ==
- B. Kalyanasundaram
- A. Karunakaran, 1958/59
- Ajay Kudua, 1994/2005
- Rohan Kunnummal, 2017–present
- Arun Karthik
- Akshay Kodoth
- Vinod Kumar
- Shyam Kumar
- Krishna Kumar
- V Kamaruddin

== M ==
- Satish Menon
- Madan Mohan
- Thomas Mathew
- Sudhesan Midhun
- Vinoop Manoharan
- Karaparambil Monish
- Abhishek Mohan
- Unnikrishnan Manukrishnan
- Renjith Menon
- Bala Murali
- Acharath Mackey
- Prashanth Menon
- P. M. K. Mohandas
- Sachin Mohan
- P Manoj
- TS Mahadevan
- SP Mullick
- TK Madhavan

== N ==
- Venkateswarier Neelakantan
- MD Nidheesh
- Salman Nizar
- Sreekumar Nair
- Nizar Niyas

== O ==
- Sunil Oasis

== P ==
- **Devdutt Padikkal**, 2021–present
- Rohan Prem
- Prasanth Parameswaran
- Padmanabhan Prasanth
- Balan Pandit
- KB Pawan
- **Arun Poulose**

== R ==
- P. Ranganathan
- S Rajesh, 1981/82 and 1988/89
- S Ramesh
- Sadagoppan Ramesh, 2005/07
- Ramesh Sampath ,1973 - 1979
- Ponnam Rahul, 2017–present
- Feroze V Rasheed
- B. Ramprakash
- Karimuttathu Rakesh
- P. M. K. Raghunath
- P. M. Raghavan
- **Chundangapoyil Rizwan**
- R. Raghunath
- K. Rajagopal
- D Ram

== S ==
- Somasetty Suresh
- Antony Sebastian, 2004–2008
- Udiramala Subramaniam, 1970/71-1976/77
- **Sanju Samson**, 2011–present
- Ponani Sunder, 1988/89-1995/96
- S Santosh, 1983/84 and 1991/92
- **S Sreesanth**
- M. Suresh Kumar, 1991/92 - 2004/05
- Jalaj Saxena
- Sujith Somasunder
- Nikhilesh Surendran
- Chovvakkaran Shahid
- Kanakkatharaparambu Sreejith
- Sambasiva Sarma
- Sivasubramaniyan Shankar
- V. Sreekumar
- Padmanabhan Sivadas
- Vishweshwar A Suresh, 2021–present
- Sharafuddeen, 2021–present

== T ==
- Chandra Tejas, 2007/08
- Jayamohan Thampi 1979/82
- Basil Thampi
- Kelappan Thampuran (cricketer, born 1937)
- Bhavin Thakkar
- Rama Varma Kochaniyan Thampuran
- Kochunny Thampuran
- Kerala Varma Kelappan Thampuran
- Kelappan Thampuran (cricketer, born 1925)

== U ==
- **Robin Uthappa**, 2019–present

== V ==
- TS Venkitachalam, 1959/60
- Chandroth Vijayan, 1957/58
- Vishnu Vinod
- Ajay Varma
- Amit Verma

== W ==
- **Sandeep Warrier**, 2012–20

== Y ==
- **Tinu Yohannan**, 1999-08
