= 2017–18 Ranji Trophy Group B =

Cricket tournament

2017-18 Ranji Trophy Group B
- The Ranji Trophy, awarded to the winners
- Dates: 6 October 2017 – 28 November 2017
- Administrator: BCCI
- Cricket format: First-class cricket
- Tournament format: Round-robin
- Host: India
- Participants: 7

The 2017–18 Ranji Trophy was the 84th season of the Ranji Trophy, the first-class cricket tournament in India. It was contested by 28 teams divided into four groups, each containing seven teams. The top two teams from Group B progressed to the quarterfinals of the competition.

Defending champions Gujarat and Kerala progressed to the knockout stage of the competition after beating Jharkhand and Haryana respectively in the final round of group-stage fixtures. It was the first time that Kerala had progressed to the quarter-finals of the Ranji Trophy.

== Teams ==
The following teams were placed in Group B, based on their average points in the previous three years:

- Gujarat
- Haryana
- Jammu & Kashmir
- Jharkhand
- Kerala
- Rajasthan
- Saurashtra

== Points table ==
Team	Pld	W	L	D	A	Pts	NRR
Gujarat	6	5	0	1	0	34	+0.097
Kerala	6	5	1	0	0	31	+0.636
Saurashtra	6	3	1	2	0	26	+0.245
Jammu & Kashmir	6	1	4	1	0	9	–0.077
Haryana	6	1	4	1	0	9	–0.506
Jharkhand	6	1	4	1	0	8	–0.049
Rajasthan	6	0	2	4	0	6	–0.294

- Top two teams advanced to the knockout stage

== Fixtures ==
=== Round 1 ===
6–9 October 2017
Scorecard

Jharkhand	v	Kerala
202 (73.2 overs); Ishan Kishan 45 (100); Jalaj Saxena 6/50 (30 overs)		259 (90.3 overs); Jalaj Saxena 54* (148); Sunny Gupta 6/94 (35 overs)
89 (41.3 overs); Saurabh Tiwary 26* (44); Jalaj Saxena 5/27 (20.3 overs)		34/1 (5 overs); Arun Karthik 27* (21); Samar Quadri 1/15 (2 overs)

Kerala won by 9 wickets
Greenfield International Stadium, Thiruvananthapuram
Umpires: Anil Dandekar and Nikhil Patwardhan
Player of the match: Jalaj Saxena (Kerala)

- Jharkhand won the toss and elected to bat.
- Ponnan Rahul (Kerala) and Nazim Siddiqui (Jharkhand) both made their first-class debuts.

6–9 October 2017
Scorecard

Rajasthan	v	Jammu & Kashmir
330 (115.2 overs); Robin Bist 113 (233); Mohammed Mudhasir 5/81 (33.2 overs)		436/8d (156.5 overs); Ahmed Bandy 102 (205); Tanveer Ul-Haq 3/43 (21 overs)
246/4 (68 overs); Rajesh Bishnoi 101* (138); Rohit Sharma 2/28 (10 overs)

Match drawn
Sawai Mansingh Stadium, Jaipur
Umpires: Yeshwant Barde and Vineet Kulkarni
Player of the match: Mohammed Mudhasir (Jammu & Kashmir)

- Jammu & Kashmir won the toss and elected to field.
- Khaleel Ahmed and Tajinder Singh (Rajasthan) both made their first-class debuts.

6–9 October 2017
Scorecard

Saurashtra	v	Haryana
278 (90.3 overs); Prerak Mankad 68 (115); Ashish Hooda 6/61 (24 overs)		107 (42.3 overs); Rahul Tewatia 23 (29); Shaurya Sanandia 4/44 (13 overs)
		140 (43 overs) (f/o); Chaitanya Bishnoi 56 (115); Jaydev Unadkat 3/55 (14 overs)

Saurashtra won by an innings and 31 runs
Chaudhary Bansi Lal Cricket Stadium, Rohtak
Umpires: Sivasubramaniyan Shankar and R. Sundar
Player of the match: Prerak Mankad (Saurashtra)

- Saurashtra won the toss and elected to bat.
- Amit Rana (Haryana) made his first-class debut.

=== Round 2 ===
14–17 October 2017
Scorecard

Kerala	v	Gujarat
208 (66.5 overs); Sanju Samson 51 (83); Piyush Chawla 5/69 (19.5 overs)		307 (106.3 overs); Chirag Gandhi 91 (145); Akshay Chandran 3/52 (24.3 overs)
203 (76.3 overs); Arun Karthik 69 (148); Siddharth Desai 6/80 (26.3 overs)		108/6 (42.3 overs); Priyank Panchal 30 (77); Jalaj Saxena 2/16 (14 overs)

Gujarat won by 4 wickets
GS Patel Stadium, Nadiad
Umpires: Krishnamachari Bharatan and Subrat Das
Player of the match: Siddharth Desai (Gujarat)

- Kerala won the toss and elected to bat.
- Siddharth Desai (Gujarat) and Sijomon Joseph (Kerala) both made their first-class debuts.
- Siddharth Desai (Gujarat) took his maiden five-wicket haul in first-class cricket.

14–17 October 2017
Scorecard

Rajasthan	v	Jharkhand
423 (141.5 overs); Tajinder Singh 134 (282); Sunny Gupta 3/76 (27.5 overs)		265 (97.3 overs); Saurabh Tiwary 83 (157); Pankaj Singh 4/48 (24 overs)
		332/6 (103.5 overs) (f/o); Ishank Jaggi 103* (193); Pankaj Singh 3/53 (12 overs)

Match drawn
Sawai Mansingh Stadium, Jaipur
Umpires: Anil Dandekar and Krishnaraj Srinath
Player of the match: Amitkumar Gautam (Rajasthan)

- Jharkhand won the toss and elected to field.
- Tajinder Singh (Rajasthan) scored his maiden first-class century.

14–17 October 2017
Scorecard

Saurashtra	v	Jammu & Kashmir
624/7d (135 overs); Ravindra Jadeja 201 (313); Waseem Raza 3/164 (35 overs)		156 (60.5 overs); Shubham Khajuria 41 (137); Dharmendrasinh Jadeja 6/68 (21 overs)
		256 (84.1 overs) (f/o); Ram Dayal 56 (73); Vandit Jivrajani 6/79 (24.1 overs)

Saurashtra won by an innings and 212 runs
Saurashtra Cricket Association Stadium, Rajkot
Umpires: Nikhil Patwardhan and Tapan Sharma
Player of the match: Ravindra Jadeja (Saurashtra)

- Saurashtra won the toss and elected to bat.

=== Round 3 ===
24–27 October 2017
Scorecard

Kerala	v	Rajasthan
335 (118.3 overs); Rohan Prem 79 (157); Mahipal Lomror 4/51 (22.3 overs)		243 (82.3 overs); Dishant Yagnik 62 (134); Jalaj Saxena 8/85 (33.3 overs)
250/4d (50.4 overs); Jalaj Saxena 105* (157); Tajinder Singh 2/38 (6.4 overs)		211 (83.4 overs); Robin Bist 70 (143); Sijomon Joseph 5/84 (30.4 overs)

Kerala won by 131 runs
St Xavier's College Ground, Thumba
Umpires: Rohan Pandit
Player of the match: Jalaj Saxena (Kerala)

- Kerala won the toss and elected to bat.
- Sijomon Joseph (Kerala) took his maiden five-wicket haul in first-class cricket.

24–27 October 2017
Scorecard

Haryana	v	Jharkhand
208 (75.4 overs); Chaitanya Bishnoi 61 (205); Sunny Gupta 4/67 (25 overs)		425/9d (133.5 overs); Ishank Jaggi 135 (237); Chaitanya Bishnoi 2/43 (20.5 overs)
296 (113 overs); Rajat Paliwal 93 (237); Shahbaz Nadeem 6/93 (42 overs)		81/0 (10.4 overs); Ishan Kishan 46* (45)

Jharkhand won by 10 wickets
JSCA International Stadium Complex, Ranchi
Umpires: K. N. Ananthapadmanabhan and Sadashiv Iyer
Player of the match: Ishank Jaggi (Jharkhand)

- Haryana won the toss and elected to bat.
- Ajit Chahal (Haryana) made his first-class debut.

24–27 October 2017
Scorecard

Jammu & Kashmir	v	Gujarat
261 (77.2 overs); Shubham Khajuria 54 (86); Piyush Chawla 5/92 (24 overs)		455 (143 overs); Manpreet Juneja 131 (279); Manik Gupta 5/143 (29 overs)
130 (34.4 overs); Ram Dayal 29 (26); Hardik Patel 5/49 (14.4 overs)

Gujarat won by an innings and 64 runs
Lalabhai Contractor Stadium, Surat
Umpires: Jayaraman Madanagopal and Nitin Pandit
Player of the match: Manprit Juneja (Gujarat)

- Jammu & Kashmir won the toss and elected to bat.

=== Round 4 ===
1–4 November 2017
Scorecard

Saurashtra	v	Jharkhand
553/9d (161 overs); Cheteshwar Pujara 204 (355); Ashish Kumar 3/76 (33 overs)		270 (82.1 overs); Ishank Jaggi 114 (171); Vandit Jivrajani 4/33 (14 overs)
59/4 (14 overs); Robin Uthappa 17 (18); Ashish Kumar 2/20 (6 overs)		341 (83 overs) (f/o); Sumit Kumar 108 (147); Dharmendrasinh Jadeja 4/108 (21 overs)

Saurashtra won by 6 wickets
Madhavrao Scindia Cricket Ground, Rajkot
Umpires: Yeshwant Barde and Saiyed Khalid
Player of the match: Cheteshwar Pujara (Saurashtra)

- Saurashtra won the toss and elected to bat.
- Cheteshwar Pujara (Saurashtra) scored his 12th double-century, the most by an Indian batsman in first-class cricket, breaking the record set by Vijay Merchant.

1–4 November 2017
Scorecard

Gujarat	v	Haryana
236 (84.1 overs); Bhargav Merai 52 (98); Amit Mishra 4/63 (26.1 overs)		157 (64 overs); Rohit Sharma 65* (129); Piyush Chawla 4/48 (21 overs)
281/9d (76.5 overs); Priyank Panchal 67 (108); Ashish Hooda 4/79 (21.5 overs)		122 (44.3 overs); Sanjay Pahal 41 (55); Piyush Chawla 5/44 (14.3 overs)

Gujarat won by 238 runs
Sardar Vallabhbhai Patel Stadium, Valsad
Umpires: Sadashiv Iyer and Krishnaraj Srinath
Player of the match: Siddharth Desai (Gujarat)

- Gujarat won the toss and elected to bat.

1–4 November 2017
Scorecard

Kerala	v	Jammu & Kashmir
219 (76 overs); Sanju Samson 112 (187); Parvez Rasool 6/70 (26 overs)		173 (62 overs); Shubham Khajuria 41 (84); KC Akshay 4/37 (14 overs)
191 (65.3 overs); Rohan Prem 58 (149); Parvez Rasool 5/70 (28 overs)		79 (41.5 overs); Parvez Rasool 17 (29); KC Akshay 5/21 (13.5 overs)

Kerala won by 158 runs
St Xavier's College Ground, Thumba
Umpires: Vineet Kulkarni and Nitin Pandit
Player of the match: Sanju Samson (Kerala)

- Kerala won the toss and elected to bat.
- KC Akshay (Kerala) made his first-class debut.
- Parvez Rasool (Jammu & Kashmir) took his tenth five-wicket haul in first-class cricket.
- KC Akshay (Kerala) took his maiden five-wicket haul in first-class cricket.

=== Round 5 ===
9–12 November 2017
Scorecard

Saurashtra	v	Gujarat
570 (161.4 overs); Cheteshwar Pujara 182 (313); Siddharth Desai 4/154 (36.4 overs)		413 (145.1 overs); Priyank Panchal 145 (289); Jaydev Unadkat 4/83 (29 overs)
98/1 (30.1 overs); Robin Uthappa 64* (85); Siddharth Desai 1/40 (12 overs)

Match drawn
Saurashtra Cricket Association Stadium, Rajkot
Umpires: Sudhir Asnani and R. Sundar
Player of the match: Cheteshwar Pujara (Saurashtra)

- Saurashtra won the toss and elected to bat.

9–12 November 2017
Scorecard

Jammu & Kashmir	v	Jharkhand
376 (100.3 overs); Puneet Bisht 115 (142); Varun Aaron 4/54 (22 overs)		292/9d (108 overs); Nazim Siddiqui 70 (69); Aamir Aziz 4/86 (25 overs)
265/9d (63.5 overs); Parvez Rasool 70 (74); Utkarsh Singh 3/40 (10 overs)		243 (49.4 overs); Ishan Kishan 52 (56); Aamir Aziz 5/63 (16 overs)

Jammu & Kashmir won by 106 runs
Keenan Stadium, Jamshedpur
Umpires: K. N. Ananthapadmanabhan and Ulhas Gandhe
Player of the match: Parvez Rasool (Jammu & Kashmir)

- Jammu & Kashmir won the toss and elected to bat.
- Utkarsh Singh (Jharkhand) and Aquib Nazir (Jammu & Kashmir) both made their first-class debuts.

9–12 November 2017
Scorecard

Haryana	v	Rajasthan
233 (71 overs); Harshal Patel 83 (108); Aniket Choudhary 3/37 (16 overs)		150 (52.4 overs); Tajinder Singh 38 (42); Ajit Chahal 3/42 (10.4 overs)
179/5d (55 overs); Shivam Chauhan 65 (104); Aniket Choudhary 2/30 (12 overs)		59/7 (39 overs); Mahipal Lomror 20* (98); Ashish Hooda 3/8 (12 overs)

Match drawn
Chaudhary Bansi Lal Cricket Stadium, Rohtak
Umpires: Yeshwant Barde and Belur Ravi
Player of the match: Harshal Patel (Haryana)

- Rajasthan won the toss and elected to field.

=== Round 6 ===
17–20 November 2017
Scorecard

Kerala	v	Saurashtra
225 (78 overs); Sanju Samson 68 (104); Dharmendrasinh Jadeja 6/112 (33 overs)		232 (78.5 overs); Robin Uthappa 86 (120); Sijomon Joseph 4/43 (19 overs)
411/6d (92 overs); Sanju Samson 175 (180); Dharmendrasinh Jadeja 4/153 (35 overs)		95 (51.3 overs); Sheldon Jackson 24 (74); Jalaj Saxena 4/29 (14.3 overs)

Kerala won by 309 runs
St Xavier's College Ground, Thumba
Umpires: Nikhil Patwardhan and Virender Sharma
Player of the match: Sanju Samson (Kerala)

- Kerala won the toss and elected to bat.

17–20 November 2017
Scorecard

Haryana	v	Jammu & Kashmir
184 (65.4 overs); Amit Mishra 41 (79); Ram Dayal 5/57 (24.4 overs)		176 (54.5 overs); Ahmed Bandy 67 (81); Ashish Hooda 3/38 (17 overs)
167 (86.3 overs); Rajat Paliwal 45 (144); Ram Dayal 6/44 (27.3 overs)		157 (44.1 overs); Owais Shah 52* (85); Ajit Chahal 5/53 (19 overs)

Haryana won by 18 runs
CH Bansi Lal Cricket Stadium, Rohtak
Umpires: Jayaraman Madanagopal and Krishnaraj Srinath
Player of the match: Ajit Chahal (Haryana)

- Jammu & Kashmir won the toss and elected to field

17–20 November 2017
Scorecard

Rajasthan	v	Gujarat
153 (50 overs); Tajinder Singh 45 (54); Chintan Gaja 8/40 (15 overs)		601/4d (155 overs); Parthiv Patel 173 (172); Mahipal Lomror 1/95 (24 overs)
341 (107.3 overs); Robin Bist 81 (146); Siddharth Desai 5/129 (39 overs)

Gujarat won by an innings and 107 run
Lalabhai Contractor Stadium, Surat
Umpires: Sadashiv Iyer and R. Sundar
Player of the match: Chintan Gaja (Gujarat)

- Rajasthan won the toss and elected to field.
- Shubham Sharma (Rajasthan) made his first-class debut.

=== Round 7 ===
25–28 November 2017
Scorecard

Haryana	v	Kerala
208 (81.3 overs); Rajat Paliwal 46 (140); Sandeep Warrier 4/50 (18 overs)		389 (129.3 overs); Rohan Prem 93 (314); Ajit Chahal 5/90 (25.3 overs)
173 (78.3 overs); Amit Mishra 40 (79); M. D. Nidheesh 3/27 (19.3 overs)

Kerala won by an innings and 8 runs
Chaudhary Bansi Lal Cricket Stadium, Rohtak
Umpires: Kamlesh Sharma and Nitin Pandit
Player of the match: Jalaj Saxena (Kerala)

- Haryana won the toss and elected to bat.

25–28 November 2017
Scorecard

Gujarat	v	Jharkhand
411 (130.5 overs); Rujul Bhatt 145* (224); Ashish Kumar 4/118 (30.5 overs)		242 (86.3 overs); Kumar Deobrat 80 (149); Kamlesh Thakor 3/43 (12 overs)
16/0 (1.4 overs); Priyank Panchal 12* (4)		183 (62) (f/o); Kumar Deobrat 53 (97); Hardik Patel 4/9 (6 overs)

Gujarat won by 10 wickets
JSCA International Stadium Complex, Ranchi
Umpires: Ulhas Gandhe and Virender Sharma
Player of the match: Rujul Bhatt (Gujarat)

- Jharkhand won the toss and elected to field.
- Kamlesh Thakor (Gujarat) made his first-class debut.

25–28 November 2017
Scorecard

Saurashtra	v	Rajasthan
534 (143.4 overs); Avi Barot 130 (272); Deepak Chahar 3/110 (31 overs)		275 (102.2 overs); Robin Bist 63 (148); Dharmendrasinh Jadeja 3/42 (18 overs)
		394/7 (101.2 overs) (f/o); Chetan Bist 109 (182); Dharmendrasinh Jadeja 5/167 (38 overs)

Match drawn
Sawai Mansingh Stadium, Jaipur
Umpires: K. N. Ananthapadmanabhan and Jayaraman Madanagopal
Player of the match: Dharmendrasinh Jadeja (Saurashtra)

- Rajasthan won the toss and elected to field.
