= Thampuran =

Thampuran is a surname. Notable people with the surname include:

- Aikya Keralam Thampuran (1870–1948), Maharaja (king) of Cochin, ruled between 1946 and 1949
- Kelappan Thampuran (cricketer, born 1925)
- Kelappan Thampuran (Kerala cricketer) (born 1937), Indian cricketer
- Kelappan Thampuran (Travancore-Cochin cricketer) (born 1937), former Indian first-class cricketer
- Kerala Varma Valiya Koil Thampuran CSI (1845–1914), Malayalam-language poet and translator from the Indian state of Kerala
- Kochunny Thampuran (born 1937), Indian cricketer
- Kodungallur Kunjikkuttan Thampuran (1864–1914), Malayalam poet and Sanskrit scholar lived in Kerala, India
- Kunhikuttan Thampuran (1864–1913), Indian poet from Kodungallur, Kerala
- Kunjikkuttan Thampuran (actor), Malayalam film actor, Kathakali artist and writer
- Maharaja Ravi Varma Kunjappan Thampuran or Ravi Varma V (1865–1946), the Maharaja of Cochin, India in 1943–46
- Midukkan Thampuran or Kerala Varma VI GCIE (1863–1943), the ruler of the Kingdom of Cochin from 1941 to 1943
- Raja Raja Varma Koil Thampuran, Malayalam language poet and translator from the Indian state of Kerala
- Rama Varma Kochaniyan Thampuran (1912–2014), Indian royal, who was the Valiya Thampuran or oldest male member of the Cochin Royal Family
- Rama Varma Parikshith Thampuran (died 1964), the last official ruler of the Cochin princely state
- Sakthan Thampuran (1751–1805), or Rama Varma IX, popularly known as Sakthan Thampuran, ruler of the Kingdom of Cochin
- Virulam Thampuran (died 1828), (regnal name: Kerala Varma III), Indian monarch who ruled the Kingdom of Cochin from 1809 to 1828

== See also ==
- Ramavarma Appan Thampuran Memorial, established in 1976 at Ayyanthole, Thrissur city in Kerala in memory of Ramavarma Appan Thampuran
- Sakthan Thampuran Nagar, business district of Thrissur city in Kerala state, South India
- Shakthan Thampuran Palace, situated in City of Thrissur in Kerala state, India
- Sakthan Thampuran Bio-Waste Treatment Plant, in Kerala, India, converts waste into manure
- Shaktan Thampuran Private Bus Stand, private bus terminal in Kerala, India
- Aaraam Thampuran (transl. The Sixth Lord) is a 1997 Indian Malayalam-language action drama film
- Ente Ponnu Thampuran, 1992 Indian Malayalam film
- Koyi Thampuran, the title of the Prince Consorts of the Queens and Princesses of Travancore
- Naranathu Thampuran, 2001 Indian Malayalam-language film
