= 2015–16 Vijay Hazare Trophy Group B =

- Dates: 10 December 2015 – 18 December 2015
- Administrator: BCCI
- Cricket format: List A cricket
- Tournament format: Round robin
- Host: Karnataka
- Participants: 7
- Matches: 21

2015–16 Vijay Hazare Trophy is the 14th season of the Vijay Hazare Trophy, a List A cricket tournament in India. It is contested by 27 domestic cricket teams of India divided into 4 Groups. The winner will advance to play 2015–16 Deodhar Trophy.

The top two teams advanced to the quarter finals.

== Fixtures ==
=== Round one ===
MS Dhoni returned to play domestic cricket after a gap of around eight years in the opening game against J&K. The first outing however ended in mixed results for the India ODI and T20 captain as he got out for nine but his team led by Varun Aaron registered a thrilling victory.

Propelled by Ishank Jaggi and Kaushal Singh's half-centuries, Jharkhand posted 210. Shahbaz Nadeem then claimed three for 28 while Rahul Shukla took two wickets to restrict the Mithun Manhas-led team to 201 in their allotted 50 overs while Aaron went wicketless in the match.

10 December 2015
Scorecard

Jharkhand; 210 (50 overs)	v	Jammu & Kashmir; 205/7 (50 overs)
Ishank Jaggi 54 (72); Waseem Raza 3/31 (10 overs)		Parvez Rasool 63 (67); Shahbaz Nadeem 3/28 (9 overs)

Jharkhand won by 5 runs
KSCA Cricket Ground, Alur
Umpires: Abhijit Deshmukh and Saiyed Khalid

- Jammu & Kashmir won the toss and elected to field.
- Aamir Sofi, Pranav Gupta, Rohit Sharma (Jammu & Kashmir) and Ankit Dabas (Jharkhand) made their List A debuts.

Despite captain Vinay Kumar's unbeaten half-century that helped Karnataka post 228 runs on the board followed by a four-wicket haul, the team lost their opening match to Railways in a close finish.

Earlier, debutant pacer Akshat Pandey and left-arm spinner Ashish Yadav claimed three wickets to keep Karnataka in check. Barring Mayank Agarwal the rest of the batting line-up departed for low scores. Manish Pandey returned for two while Stuart Binny was back in the dressing room for 18. Karn Sharma who had claimed two wickets returned to score a valuable 51 to help chase down the target. Besides him, Asadullah Khan and Mahesh Rawat to posted half-centuries that helped Railways seize a victory.

10 December 2015
Scorecard

Karnataka; 228/9 (50 overs)	v	Railways; 232/9 (50 overs)
Vinay Kumar 50* (48); Akshat Pandey 3/45 (10 overs)		Karn Sharma 51 (64); Vinay Kumar 4/45 (10 overs)

Railways won by 1 wicket
M Chinnaswamy Stadium, Bangalore
Umpires: Rajesh Deshpande and Virender Sharma

- Railways won the toss and elected to field.
- Aniruddha Joshi (Karnataka); Ashish Singh and Akshat Pandey (Railways) all made their List A debuts.

Haryana pulled off a nine-run win under the captaincy of Mohit Sharma against Kerala. The team, were helped to 241 by half-centurions N Saini and M Hooda followed by useful contributions from A Mishra (40*) and J Yadav (27). Yadav then returned to claim the key wicket of Sanju Samson and accounted for Jafar Jamal in an over and followed up with the wicket of F Ahmed in his next to leave Kerala on 106 for six. Mishra and Mohit then wrapped-up the opposition to bowl Haryana to victory.

10 December 2015
Scorecard

Haryana; 241/7 (50 overs)	v	Kerala; 232 (50 overs)
Mohit Hooda 54 (90); Sandeep Warrier 2/35 (10 overs); Fabid Ahmed 2/35 (10 overs)		Sachin Baby 95 (111); Jayant Yadav 3/21 (10 overs)

Haryana won by 9 runs
KSCA Cricket Ground, Alur
Umpires: Nitin Pandit and Pashchim Pathak

- Kerala won the toss and elected to field.
- Chaitanya Bishnoi, Rahul Dagar, Mohit Hooda, Rohit Sharma, Vikram Singh (Haryana); Jafar Jamal and Mohammed Azharuddeen (Kerala) all made their List A debuts.

=== Round two ===
Gujarat opened their account in the 2015–16 season of the tournament with a six-wicket win over Jharkhand in a low scoring 47-overs-a-side match at the Alur Cricket Stadium-III.

MS Dhoni top-scored for Jharkhand with 44 runs while the rest lost their wickets regularly. Axar Patel and Jasprit Bumrah claimed two wickets each to restrict Jharkhand to 177 for seven after captain Parthiv Patel elected to field.

P Panchal (62) and Patel (44) then set-up the chase with a 106-run stand after Varun Aaron claimed Smit Patel for two.

Axar then took the team to the target with R Bhatt with 38 balls to spare. After two games, Jharkhand have one win and one loss.

11 December 2015
Scorecard

Jharkhand; 177/7 (47 overs)	v	Gujarat; 179/4 (40.5 overs)
MS Dhoni 44 (64); Jasprit Bumrah 2/30 (10 overs); Axar Patel 2/30 (10 overs)		Priyank Panchal 62 (76); Shahbaz Nadeem 2/36 (8 overs)

Gujarat won by 6 wickets
KSCA Cricket Ground, Alur
Umpires: Saiyed Khalid and Virender Sharma

- Gujarat won the toss and elected to field.

Useful contributions by the lower-order - J Suchith (46) and Vinay Kumar (41) helped Karnataka to 242 after being asked to bat by Haryana skipper Mohit Sharma. Both then returned to contribute with the ball. The Karnataka captain claimed two wickets up front after Abhimanyu Mithun accounted for Saini to reduce Haryana to 10 for three. While R Dagar strove to keep Haryana in the match, he was left stranded on 96 as the team were bowled out for 204. Mithun, Vinay and Suchith claimed two wickets each for Karnataka.

11 December 2015
Scorecard

Karnataka; 242/9 (50 overs)	v	Haryana; 204 (46.3 overs)
Jagadeesha Suchith 46 (63); Harshal Patel 4/62 (10 overs)		Rahul Dagar 96* (116); Abhimanyu Mithun 2/26 (9.3 overs)

Karnataka won by 38 runs
M Chinnaswamy Stadium, Bangalore
Umpires: Abhijit Deshmukh and Nitin Pandit

- Haryana won the toss and elected to field.
- Shamsher Yadav (Haryana) and Sadiq Kirmani (Karnataka) both made their List A debuts.

Opener VA Jagadeesh propelled Kerala to 256 for eight with 121 off 137 balls. The century complemented by useful contributions from the middle-order helped the team set Railways a modest target. The Warrier-led attack then skittled Railways out for 196 to post a comprehensive win.

Warrier, Fabid Ahmed, P Padmanabhan and Rohan Prem claimed two wickets each to bowl Kerala to victory.

11 December 2015
Scorecard

Kerala; 256/8 (50 overs)	v	Railways; 196 (43.1 overs)
V. A. Jagadeesh 121 (137); Anureet Singh 4/40 (10 overs)		Saurabh Wakaskar 77 (92); Fabid Ahmed 2/39 (9 overs)

Kerala won by 60 runs
KSCA Cricket Ground, Alur
Umpires: Rajesh Deshpande and Pashchim Pathak

- Railways won the toss and elected to field.

=== Round three ===
13 December 2015
Scorecard

Railways; 259/5 (50 overs)	v	Gujarat; 260/6 (49.4 overs)
Arindam Ghosh 96 (122); Axar Patel 1/35 (10 overs)		Axar Patel 75 (59); Karn Sharma 2/38 (10 overs)

Gujarat won by 4 wickets
KSCA Cricket Ground, Alur
Umpires: Saiyed Khalid and Virender Sharma

- Gujarat won the toss and elected to field.

13 December 2015
Scorecard

Jammu & Kashmir; 75 (22 overs)	v	Haryana; 76/0 (11 overs)
Bandeep Singh 24 (32); Harshal Patel 5/21 (7 overs)		Harshal Patel 54* (29)

Haryana won by 10 wickets
KSCA Cricket Ground, Alur
Umpires: Rajesh Deshpande and Pashchim Pathak

- Jammu & Kashmir won the toss and elected to bat.
- Umang Chugh, Poonish Mehta (Haryana) and Asif Rasool (Jammu & Kashmir) all made their List A debuts.
- Amit Mishra (Haryana) took a hat-trick.

13 December 2015
Scorecard

Kerala; 236/8 (50 overs)	v	Jharkhand; 240/5 (47 overs)
Sachin Baby 61 (96); Rahul Shukla 3/47 (10 overs)		Saurabh Tiwary 87* (94); Nizar Niyas 1/29 (6 overs)

Jharkhand won by 5 wickets
M Chinnaswamy Stadium, Bangalore
Umpires: Abhijit Deshmukh and Nitin Pandit

- Jharkhand won the toss and elected to field.
- Mohan Akshaya (Kerala) made his List A debut

=== Round four ===
14 December 2015
Scorecard

Karnataka; 233/8 (50 overs)	v	Gujarat; 189/8 (44 overs)
Manish Pandey 94* (123); Axar Patel 2/33 (10 overs)		Priyank Kirit Panchal 52 (77); Jagadeesha Suchith 2/25 (9 overs)

Karnataka won by 15 runs (VJD method)
KSCA Cricket Ground, Alur
Umpires: Saiyed Khalid and Virender Sharma

- Gujarat won the toss and elected to field.
- Praveen Dubey (Karnataka) made his List A debut.

14 December 2015
Scorecard

Haryana; 133 (33 overs)	v	Jharkhand; 134/1 (29.4 overs)
Rahul Dagar 38 (58); Rahul Shukla 3/33 (8 overs)		Ishank Jaggi 62* (92); Harshal Patel 1/38 (9.4 overs)

Jharkhand won by 9 wickets
KSCA Cricket Ground, Alur
Umpires: Rajesh Deshpande and Nitin Pandit

- Haryana won the toss and elected to bat.

14 December 2015
Scorecard

Jammu & Kashmir; 130 (42.3 overs)	v	Kerala; 134/3 (29.5 overs)
Bandeep Singh 31 (62); Fabid Ahmed 3/24 (9 overs)		Nikhilesh Surendran 85* (90); Parvez Rasool 3/33 (8 overs)

Kerala won by 7 wickets
KSCA Cricket Ground, Alur
Umpires: Abhijit Deshmukh and Pashchim Pathak

- Kerala won the toss and elected to field.
- Mohsin Mufti (Jammu & Kashmir) made his List A debut.

=== Round five ===
15 December 2015
Scorecard

Gujarat; 259 (49.5 overs)	v	Haryana; 231 (49.5 overs)
Rujul Bhatt 55 (75); Amit Mishra 3/44 (10 overs)		Poonish Mehta 57 (74); Rush Kalaria 4/37 (8.5 overs)

Gujarat won by 28 runs
M Chinnaswamy Stadium, Bangalore
Umpires: Saiyed Khalid and Nitin Pandit

- Haryana won the toss and elected to field.

15 December 2015
Scorecard

Railways; 200 (49.4 overs)	v	Jammu & Kashmir; 157 (43.5 overs)
Karn Sharma 60 (71); Waseem Raza 4/31 (10 overs)		Ian Dev Singh 60 (83); Ashish Yadav 3/28 (10 overs)

Railways won by 43 runs
KSCA Cricket Ground, Alur
Umpires: Rajesh Deshpande and Pashchim Pathak

- Jammu & Kashmir won the toss and elected to field.

15 December 2015
Scorecard

Jharkhand; 216/8 (50 overs)	v	Karnataka; 169 (45 overs)
Ishank Jaggi 50 (95); Jagadeesha Suchith 4/35 (10 overs)		Lokesh Rahul 42 (84); Shahbaz Nadeem 3/15 (8 overs)

Jharkhand won by 47 runs
KSCA Cricket Ground, Alur
Umpires: Abhijit Deshmukh and Virender Sharma

- Karnataka won the toss and elected to field.
- Sonu Singh (Jharkhand); David Mathias and Abhishek Reddy (Karnataka) all made their List A debuts.

=== Round six ===
17 December 2015
Scorecard

Gujarat; 187 (49.2 overs)	v	Jammu & Kashmir; 151 (47.2 overs)
Rujul Bhatt 66 (103); Omar Alam 3/31 (7.2 overs)		Parvez Rasool 65 (91); Hardik Patel 4/28 (10 overs)

Gujarat won by 36 runs
KSCA Cricket Ground, Alur
Umpires: Abhijit Deshmukh and Nitin Pandit

- Jammu & Kashmir won the toss and elected to field.
- Nadeem Dar (Jammu & Kashmir) made his List A debut.

17 December 2015
Scorecard

Jharkhand; 211/5 (45 overs)	v	Railways; 96 (37 overs)
Saurabh Tiwary 49 (66); Avinash Yadav 2/44 (9 overs)		Arindam Ghosh 44 (94); Sonu Singh 4/15 (6 overs)

Jharkhand won by 115 runs
KSCA Cricket Ground, Alur
Umpires: Rajesh Deshpande and Saiyed Khalid

- Jharkhand won the toss and elected to bat.
- The match was reduced to 45 overs-per side.

17 December 2015
Scorecard

Kerala; 49 (22 overs)	v	Karnataka; 51/1 (5.5 overs)
Sachin Baby 12 (35); Shreyas Gopal 5/19 (5 overs)		Karun Nair 24* (19); Unnikrishnan Manukrishnan 1/27 (2.5 overs)

Karnataka won by 9 wickets
M Chinnaswamy Stadium, Bangalore
Umpires: Pashchim Pathak and Virender Sharma

- Kerala won the toss and elected to bat.

=== Round seven ===
18 December 2015
Scorecard

Kerala; 102 (43.2 overs)	v	Gujarat; 103/3 (32.5 overs)
Sachin Baby 41 (91); Axar Patel 3/16 (10 overs)		Rujul Bhatt 35 (70); Fabid Ahmed 2/28 (8 overs)

Gujarat won by 7 wickets
KSCA Cricket Ground, Alur
Umpires: Nitin Pandit and Virender Sharma

- Gujarat won the toss and elected to field.

18 December 2015
Scorecard

Railways; 219/7 (50 overs)	v	Haryana; 113 (35.1 overs)
Arindam Ghosh 76 (118); Ashish Hooda 2/28 (6 overs)		Rohit Sharma 26 (56); Karn Sharma 5/13 (9.1 overs)

Railways won by 106 runs
KSCA Cricket Ground, Alur
Umpires: Rajesh Deshpande and Saiyed Khalid

- Haryana won the toss and elected to field.
- Faiz Ahmed (Railways) made his List A debut.

18 December 2015
Scorecard

Karnataka; 349/5 (50 overs)	v	Jammu & Kashmir; 142 (27.3 overs)
Chidhambaram Gautam 109 (102); Zahoor Sofi 2/58 (10 overs)		Bandeep Singh 42 (32); Jagadeesha Suchith 3/26 (7.3 overs)

Karnataka won by 207 runs
M Chinnaswamy Stadium, Bangalore
Umpires: Abhijit Deshmukh and Pashchim Pathak

- Jammu & Kashmir won the toss and elected to field.
