= List of Travancore-Cochin cricketers =

This is a list of cricketers who have played first-class, List A or Twenty20 cricket for Travancore-Cochin cricket team. Given are first and last seasons; the player did not necessarily play in all the intervening seasons. Players in bold have played international cricket.

== A ==
- P. M. Anandan

== M ==
- Acharath Mackey

== P ==
- Balan Pandit

== R ==
- P. M. Raghavan

== S ==
- Padmanabhan Sivadas, 1951/52

== T ==
- Kelappan Thampuran, 1951/52
- Kerala Varma Kelappan Thampuran, 1951/52
- Kochunny Thampuran, 1956/57
- Cecil Timmins (1952/53)
