= Menon (surname) =

Menon (Malayalam: [meːnoːn]) is a surname. Notable people with the surname include:

== Indian ==
=== In arts, entertainment, and media ===
==== Journalism ====
- Appan Menon (1947–1996), Indian print and television journalist
- C. Karunakara Menon (1863–1922), Indian journalist and politician
- Chengalathu Kunhirama Menon (1857–1935), Indian journalist
- Mini Menon, Indian journalist
- Ramesh Menon, Indian author, journalist, and documentary film maker

==== Literature ====
- Anil Menon, Indian computer scientist and writer of speculative fiction
- I. K. K. Menon (1919–2013), Indian writer
- Indu Menon (born 1980), Indian writer, novelist, and sociologist
- M. K. Menon (1928–1993), Indian writer
- Menon Marath (1906–2003), Indo-Anglican novelist
- Nalapat Narayana Menon (1887–1954), Indian author
- Nivedita Menon, feminist writer and professor of political thought at Jawaharlal Nehru University
- Oyyarathu Chandu Menon (1847–1899), Indian novelist
- Puthezhath Raman Menon (1891–1973), Indian Writer, President of Kerala Sahitya Akademy, Judge of Kerala High Court
- P.C. Kuttikrishna Menon (1915–1979), Indian author, also known as Uroob
- Ramesh Menon, Indian author, journalist, and documentary film maker
- Ritu Menon, Indian feminist writer and publisher
- Sandhya Menon, American young adult fiction author
- Sreebala K Menon, Malayali author and filmmaker
- Vallathol Narayana Menon (1878–1958), Indian poet
- Vyloppilli Sreedhara Menon (1911–1985), Indian poet

==== Performing arts and film ====
- Aishwarya Menon (born 1992), Indian film actress
- Alok Vaid-Menon (born 1991), American writer and performance artist
- Anjali Menon, Indian film director and screenwriter
- Anoop Menon, Indian film actor, screenwriter and lyricist
- Anuradha Menon, Indian television actress and theatre artist
- Arjun Menon (born 1987), Indian playback singer
- Asha G. Menon (born 1986), Indian playback singer
- Balachandra Menon (born 1954), Indian film actor, director and script writer
- Bhaskar Menon, Indian music executive
- Karthika Menon (born 1986), Indian film actress known by her stage name Bhavana
- Biju Menon (born 1970), Indian film actor
- Divya S. Menon (born 1987), Indian singer and television anchor
- Gautham Vasudev Menon (born 1973), Indian film maker
- Hemanth Menon (born 1989), Indian film actor
- Jaya Menon, Indian actress
- Kay Kay Menon (born 1966), Indian film, stage and television actor
- Lakshmi Menon (actress) (born 1996), Indian film actress
- Lakshmi Menon (model) (born 1981), Indian model
- Nithya Menon, Indian film actress and playback singer
- P. N. Menon (director) (1928–2008), film maker
- Pattikkamthodi Ravunni Menon (1881–1949), Indian actor
- Rajiv Menon (born 1963), Indian advertising director, cinematographer, actor and film maker
- Ramesh Menon, Indian author, journalist, and documentary film maker
- Ravi Menon (1950–2007), Indian film actor
- Rejith Menon (born 1988), Indian film actor
- Renuka Menon, Indian Malayali film actress
- Revathi Menon, Indian film actress and director
- Sekhar Menon (born 1980), Indian actor
- Sheetal Menon, Indian model and actress
- Shweta Menon, Indian model, actress and television anchor
- Siddharth Menon (born 1989), Indian Malayalam playback singer and actor
- Siddharth Menon (born 1989), Indian Hindi and Marathi film actor
- Sindhu Menon, Indian film actress
- Sreebala K Menon, Malayali author and filmmaker
- Sreevalsan J. Menon, Indian vocalist and composer
- Suresh Menon (born 1967), Indian actor, comedian and television personality
- Suresh Chandra Menon Indian actor, cinematographer and film director
- Unni Menon (born 1955), Indian film playback singer
- Valsala Menon (born 1945), Indian film actress
- Vimala Menon (born 1943), Indian dance instructor

==== Other arts ====
- Anjolie Ela Menon (born 1940), Indian contemporary artist
- C. Madhava Menon (1911–1984), Indian painter
- T.A.S Menon, Indian artist and former Principal of the Raja Ravi Varma College of Fine Arts Mavelikara

=== In business ===
- G. A. Menon (1931–2003), Indian businessperson
- Jaishankar Menon (born 1956), Indian electrical engineer; developer of RAID technology
- P. N. C. Menon (born 1948), Indian-Omani businessman

=== In government, law, and politics ===
==== In government ====
- A. R. Menon (1886–1960), Indian National Congress politician and doctor
- Ambat Sivarama Menon (1870–1939), Indian politician
- C. Achutha Menon (1913–1991), former Chief Minister of Kerala
- C. Karunakara Menon (1863–1922), Indian journalist and politician
- C. P. Karunakara Menon (1891–1976), Indian civil servant and administrator
- K. P. S. Menon (senior) (1898–1982), Indian civil servant
- Lakshmi N. Menon (1899–1994), former Deputy Foreign Minister of India
- Leela Damodara Menon (born 1923), Indian politician
- M. G. Ramachandran (1917–1987), actor and previous Chief Minister of Tamil Nadu
- M. G. K. Menon (born 1928), Indian physicist and policymaker
- Muthal Puredath Murlidhar Menon, Indian diplomat
- N. Gopala Menon, Indian lawyer and politician
- P. N. Menon (diplomat) (1920–1975), Indian Ambassador to Greece and Yugoslavia
- P. Narayana Menon, Indian lawyer, politician and administrator
- Panampilly Govinda Menon (1906–1970), Indian politician, lawyer, and freedom fighter
- Prabhakar Menon retired Indian diplomat
- Shivshankar Menon (born 1949), Indian National Security Advisor
- T. Govindan Menon (born 1823), Indian civil servant and administrator
- T. Sankunni Menon (1820–1881), Indian civil servant and administrator
- V. K. Krishna Menon (1896–1974), former Defence Minister of India
- V. P. Menon (1893–1965), Indian civil servant; played a vital role in the integration of India
- Vinod C. Menon, member of the National Disaster Management Authority of India

==== Social activists ====
- K. P. K. Menon, Indian lawyer and political activist
- K. P. Karunakara Menon (1930–2002), Indian social activist; former president of the Nair Service Society
- K. P. Kesava Menon (1886–1978), Indian independence activist
- Mukundan C. Menon, Indian human rights activist
- Panampilly Govinda Menon (1906–1970), Indian politician, lawyer, and freedom fighter
- V. Viswanatha Menon, Indian communist political activist

=== In science and academia ===
- A. Sreedhara Menon (1925–2010), Indian historian
- Anand Menon, Professor of European Politics and Foreign Affairs at King's College London
- Anil Menon, Indian computer scientist and writer of speculative fiction
- Geeta Menon, Dean of the Undergraduate College at New York University Stern School of Business
- Indu Menon (born 1980), Indian writer, novelist, and sociologist
- K. Ramunni Menon (1872–1949), Indian educator
- M. G. K. Menon (born 1928), Indian physicist and policymaker
- M. K. Krishna Menon, Indian gynecologist and obstetrician
- Mani Menon (born 1948), Indian-American surgeon
- N. R. Madhava Menon (born 1935), Indian legal educator
- Nivedita Menon, feminist writer and professor of political thought at Jawaharlal Nehru University
- P Kesava Menon (1917–1979), Indian mathematician
- R. V. G. Menon, Indian professor of engineering
- T. Bhaskara Menon (1898–1948), professor of pathology and principal of Andhra Medical College
- Usha Menon, professor of gynaecological cancer at University College London
- V. K. Narayana Menon (born 1911), Indian art critic and scholar of classical Indian dance and Indian classical music

=== In sport ===
- Arjun Menon (coach) (c. 1977–2025), Singaporean cricket player and coach
- Narendra Menon (born 1946), former Indian cricketer
- Nitin Menon (born 1983), Indian cricketer and umpire
- Prashanth Menon (born 1977), Indian cricketer
- Ramesh Menon (cricketer) (born 1963), Indian cricketer
- Renjith Menon (born 1977), Indian cricketer
- Sashi Menon (born 1952), Indian former professional tennis player
- Satish Menon (born 1969), Indian cricketer

=== In other fields ===
- Atmananda Krishna Menon (1883–1959), Indian sage, guru, and philosopher
- Swami Chinmayananda
- Narayan Menon (born 1944), former officer of the Indian Air Force
- Radhika Menon, merchant navy officer

== French ==
It has also appeared, less frequently, as a French surname:

- Louis François Henri de Menon (1717–1776), French agronomist
- Tugdual Menon (died 1560s), French composer

== Other nationalities ==
This surname has appeared in other places:

- Aldrovani Menon (born 1972), former Brazilian football player
- Harikrish Menon (born 1973), Malaysian singer, songwriter, and record producer
- Luiz Cláudio Menon (born 1944), Brazilian basketball player
- Rashed Khan Menon (born 1943), Bangladeshi politician
- Sundaresh Menon (born 1962), Chief Justice of Singapore and a former Attorney-General of Singapore
- Vanu Gopala Menon (born 1960), Singapore civil servant and diplomat, former Permanent Representative of Singapore to the UN
- Anil Menon (born 1976), American NASA astronaut
- Anna Menon (born 1985), American engineer and commercial astronaut

== See also ==
- Meno (disambiguation)
