= Kelappan Thampuran =

Kelappan Thampuran is an Indian name and may refer to:

- Kelappan Thampuran (cricketer, born 1925), Travancore-Cochin cricket team
- Kelappan Thampuran (Kerala cricketer), Kerala cricket team
- Kelappan Thampuran (Travancore-Cochin cricketer) or Kerala Varma Kelappan (born 1937), Travancore-Cochin cricket team
