= Kunal Datta =

Kunal Datta may refer to:

- Kunal Datta (cricketer)
- Kunal Datta (musician)
