= P. M. K. Raghunath =

Personal information
- Full name: Ponnambath Mambally Krishnan Raghunath
- Born: 10 October 1950; Mahé, French India
- Died: 14 January 2016 (aged 65); Thiruvananthapuram, Kerala, India
- Batting: Right-handed
- Bowling: Right-arm medium
- Relatives: P. M. K. Mohandas (brother); A. P. M. Gopalakrishnan (cousin); P. M. Raghavan (uncle); P. M. Anandan (uncle)

Domestic team information
- Years: Team
- 1973–1978: Kerala

Career statistics
Competition	FC
Matches	9
Runs scored	31
Batting average	3.10
100s/50s	0/0
Top score	8
Balls bowled	822
Wickets	11
Bowling average	52.54
5 wickets in innings	0
10 wickets in match	0
Best bowling	3/66
Catches/stumpings	1/–
- Source: CricketArchive, 22 February 2015

Ponnambath Mambally Krishnan Raghunath (10 October 1950 – 14 January 2016) was an Indian cricketer who played at first-class level for Kerala during the 1970s. He was a right-arm medium-pace bowler and right-handed batsman.

Raghunath was born in Mahé, in what was then part of French India but is now a district of the Union Territory of Puducherry. While attending the University of Kerala in the early 1970s, he played several seasons in the inter-university competition, notably taking 6/61 against Karnatak University during the 1970–71 season. Raghunath made his Ranji Trophy debut for Kerala in November 1973, and went on to play three more matches during the 1973–74 season. In his first match, against Karnataka, he opened the bowling with Madhavan Amarnath, but took only a single wicket as his team lost by an innings, having Vijayakrishna out hit wicket. Raghunath finished the season as Kerala's leading wicket-taker, with his best figures being 3/72 against Andhra and 3/66 against Tamil Nadu.

During the 1974–75 season, Raghunath only appeared in two matches, against Tamil Nadu and Karnataka, and took only a single wicket. After that, his Ranji Trophy appearances were limited to one match in September 1976 and two matches in December 1978, with only the 1976 match (against Tamil Nadu) yielding multiple wickets. Raghunath died in Thiruvananthapuram in January 2016, after a long illness. His older brother, P. M. K. Mohandas, also played first-class cricket for Kerala, playing three matches during the 1972–73 season. Their father, P. M. Krishnan, had had a longstanding involvement with what is now the Kerala Cricket Association. Two of the brothers' uncles, P. M. Raghavan and P. M. Anandan, each played at first-class level for Travancore-Cochin, Kerala's predecessor, as did a cousin, A. P. M. Gopalakrishnan. Outside of cricket, the family's business was baking.
