= Neelakantan =

Neelakantan is an Indian surname. It may refer to:

- Neelakantan Jayachandran Nair (popularly known as "NJ"), one of the outstanding and decorated officers of the Indian Army
- Anand Neelakantan (born 1973), Indian author
- K. K. Neelakantan (1923–1992), better known by his pen name Induchoodan, Indian ornithologist
- K. S. Neelakantan Unni (1895–1980), Indian Malayalam writer and Sanskrit scholar and translator
- Neelakantan Mullanezhy or just Mullanezhy (1948–2011), Indian Malayalam poet, playwright, lyricist and actor
- P. Neelakantan (1916–1992), Indian Tamil film director
- R. Neelakantan (died 2018), best known by his stage name Neelu, a Tamil stage, film and television actor
- Sunderraman Neelakantan, Indian air force officer and Commander in Chief of the Southern Air Command of the Indian Air Force
- Venkateswarier Neelakantan (born 1941), Indian cricketer
