= KCA President's Cup T20 =

Twenty20 cricket league in India

- Countries: India
- Administrator: Kerala Cricket Association
- Format: Twenty20
- First edition: 2020–21
- Latest edition: 2025
- Tournament format: Round-robin & playoffs
- Number of teams: 6
- Current champion: KCA Royals
- Website: KCA

KCA President's Cup T20 is an Indian Twenty20 cricket league organized by Kerala Cricket Association in the state of Kerala. The league is designed on the lines of successful Indian Premier League.

== Organisation ==
=== Tournament format and squad composition ===
KCA President's Cup T20 features six teams namely KCA Lions, KCA Tigers, KCA Royals, KCA Panthers, KCA Eagles, and KCA Tuskers. Domestic players in Kerala participates in the league. Each team consist of 14 players and 2 support staffs. There are also 4 players for each team, if replacements are required. The tournament have a round-robin format with each team playing against each other twice followed by playoffs - semi finals and final. All of these are day-games with white ball and coloured clothing as per BCCI playing conditions. Two matches were played in a day. There were 33 matches in the first season.

=== Sponsorship and broadcasting ===
The promoters of the KCA President's Cup T20 is Dream 11. Twenty First Century Media pvt lmt. are the official branding partners, marketers and broadcasting partners of the league for three years. There are no franchises or owners. TCM Sports Management Pvt Ltd, a sports marketing company, associated with KCA as a commercial partner. The matches were streamed live exclusively in India on FanCode app.

=== Venue ===
The venue for the first season of KCA President's Cup T20 was Sanatana Dharma College Ground, Alappuzha. Audience are not allowed in the stadiums due to strict restrictions because of the COVID-19 pandemic in Kerala.

== Teams ==
Team	Captain	Coach
KCA Royals	Sijomon Joseph	Padmanabhan Prasanth
KCA Eagles	Mohammed Azharuddeen	Sunil Oasis
KCA Tuskers	Vathsal Govind	Biju Mon
KCA Tigers	Sachin Baby	Sebastin Antony
KCA Lions	Ponnam Rahul	Mazar Moidu
KCA Panthers	Akshay Chandran	Rajagopal

== Season 1 (2020-21) ==
2020–21 KCA President's Cup T20 was the first edition of KCA President's Cup T20. It was planned to be held from 17 December 2020 to 3 January. But the tournament got postponed as the Kerala Cricket Association didn't get a clearance from the Kerala state government to organize the tournament due to the COVID-19 pandemic. The tournament finally started from 6 March. The Kerala senior team players who were in Delhi for the 2020-21 Vijay Hazare Trophy knockout matches joined their respective squads later after undergoing RT-PCR tests on return. KCA Royals won the title.

2020–21 KCA President's Cup T20 was the inaugural season of KCA President's Cup T20 conducted by Kerala Cricket Association for promoting cricketers from Kerala. The tournament was held from March 6 to March 17.

It was planned to be held from 17 December 2020 to 3 January 2021. Later it was postponed as the Kerala government didn't give clearance to start the competition due to COVID-19 pandemic.

The competition started with a round robin group stage, in which each of the 6 teams played a match against every other team. This was followed by the playoffs. Each team had 14 players. All the matches were day-games with white ball and coloured clothing as per BCCI playing conditions. Two matches were played in a day. There were a total of 33 matches.

The Kerala senior team players who were in Delhi for the 2020-21 Vijay Hazare Trophy knockout matches joined their respective squads later after undergoing RT-PCR tests on return. Though Sanju Samson didn't play the tournament.

Venue for KCA President's Cup T20 was Sanatana Dharma College Ground, Alappuzha. The sponsors of the KCA President's Cup T20 was Dream 11.

== Season 2 (2022) ==
The 2022 KCA President's Cup T20 was the second season of the KCA President's Cup T20. It took place from September 21, 2022, to October 6, 2022.

Points table

Pos	Team	Pld	W	L	NR	Pts	NRR
1	KCA Lions (C)	10	7	3	0	14	0.867
2	KCA Eagles (R)	10	6	4	0	12	0.432
3	KCA Panthers	9	5	4	0	10	−0.957
4	KCA Tigers	12	5	5	2	12	0.524
5	KCA Royals	9	3	6	0	6	−1.002
6	KCA Tuskers	10	3	7	0	6	−0.085

- Advanced to the final
- Eliminated from Tournament

== Season 3 (2023) ==
The 2023 KCA President's Cup T20 was the third season of the KCA President's Cup T20. It took place from September 4, 2023, to September 14, 2023.

Points table

Pos	Team	Pld	W	L	NR	Pts	NRR
1	KCA Panthers (C)	8	3	0	5	11	0.833
2	KCA Lions (R)	8	3	2	3	9	1.545
3	KCA Eagles	8	3	3	2	8	0.544
4	KCA Tigers	8	3	3	2	8	−0.457
5	KCA Royals	8	1	5	2	4	−1.975

- Advanced to the final
- Eliminated from Tournament

== Season 4 (2025) ==
The 2025 KCA President's Cup T20 was the fourth season of the KCA President's Cup T20. It took place from 5 March to 15 March 2025.

Points table

Pos	Team	Pld	W	L	NR	Pts	NRR
1	KCA Lions (R)	8	5	3	0	10	0.826
2	KCA Royals (C)	8	5	3	0	10	0.256
3	KCA Eagles	8	4	4	0	8	−0.392
4	KCA Tigers	8	3	5	0	6	−0.147
5	KCA Panthers	8	3	5	0	6	−0.577

- Advanced to the final
- Eliminated from Tournament

== See also ==
- List of regional T20 cricket leagues in India
