= Kovilakam =

Type of royal residence in Kerala, India

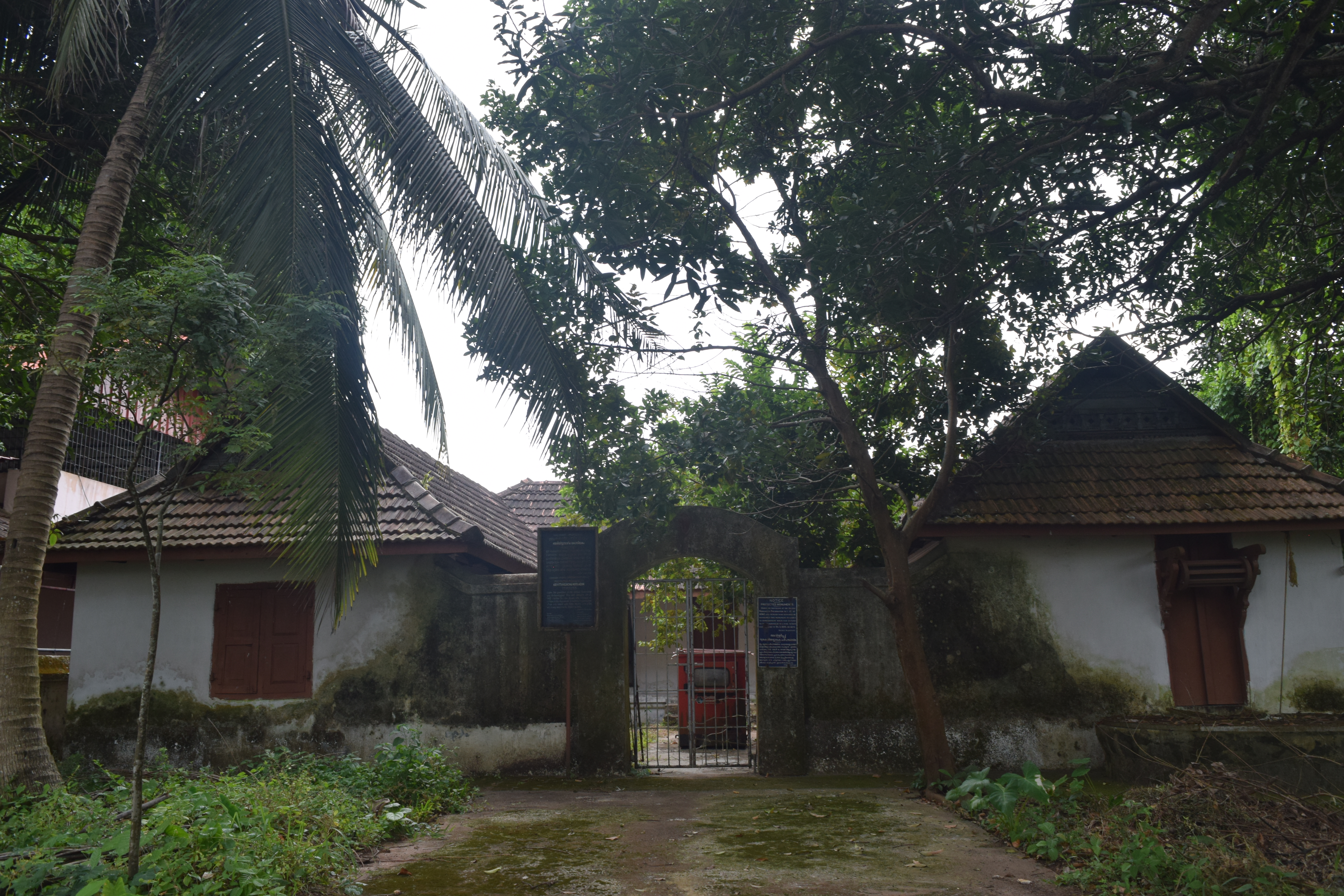
Ariyittuvazhcha Kovilakom

In Kerala, India, a Kovilakam is the principal manor, estate or palace of a princely Samantha Kshatriya (Thampuran, Koyi Thampuran, Thampan, Thirumulpad) or Samantan and Samantha Nair lineages of ruling dynasties. It is the royal residence where all the family members who did not become a Raja or Rani or otherwise accede to a Sthanam remain under the management of the eldest resident male or female member of that particular branch of the family.

In the North Malabar region, it is sometimes pronounced as Kolom (Malayalam: കോലോം). A chief princely lineage of Kerala consists of several Kovilakams representing different matrilineal branches of the same family from which the individual members could ascend to the status of Raja in accordance to their seniority in age within the lineage. The Kovilakam residences are usually large and beautiful manors or palaces with extensive wood work and mural paintings in the traditional medieval Kerala architecture style. A Kovilakam was usually endowed with estates and properties (crown lands), sufficient for the maintenance of its constituent members. At the very moment when a member ascends to any seat/station (Sthanam), they lose their residence in the Kovilakam and reside in the royal palace instead. However, there are instances when such members on ascending to a station have preferred to stay back in their Kovilakams of birth.

It was not uncommon where due to internal squabbles within different Kovilakams of a ruling princely family, a certain Kovilakam may usurp and centralize the sole right to inherit the Rajaship and deprive the other Kovilakams within the princely lineage of its inheritance to the station of Raja.

== Examples ==
1. The Kottayam Royal Princely State lineage of North Malabar had three branches; viz.:Kizhakke Kovilakam (Eastern Palace), Thekke Kovilakam (Southern Palace), Patinjare Kovilakam (Western Palace)
2. Kodungallur Kovilakam (Of the Kodungallur Swaroopam)
3. Nilambur Kovilakam (Of the Nilambur Swaroopam)
4. Paliam Kovilakam (Of the Paliam Swaroopam)
5. Edavilathu Kovilakam
6. Ayancheri Kovilakam ( Of the Kadathanad Swaroopam)
7. Travancore Kovilakam
8. Padmavavilasam Kovilakam
