= A. P. M. Gopalakrishnan =

Indian cricket player

Personal information
- Full name: Adiyeri Ponnambath Mambilly Gopalakrishnan
- Born: 3 January 1947 (age 79); Tellicherry, Madras Presidency, British India
- Batting: Right-handed
- Bowling: Right-arm off spin
- Relatives: P. M. Raghavan (father); P. M. Anandan (uncle); P. M. K. Mohandas (cousin); P. M. K. Raghunath (cousin)

Domestic team information
- Years: Team
- 1969–1972: Kerala

Career statistics
Competition	FC
Matches	10
Runs scored	110
Batting average	6.87
100s/50s	0/0
Top score	33
Balls bowled	456
Wickets	2
Bowling average	132.00
5 wickets in innings	0
10 wickets in match	0
Best bowling	1/45
Catches/stumpings	1/–
- Source: CricketArchive, 21 July 2015

Adiyeri Ponnambath Mambilly Gopalakrishnan (born 3 January 1947) is a former Indian cricketer who played at first-class level for Kerala from 1969 to 1972. He was a right-handed batsman and right-arm off-spinner.

Gopalakrishnan was born in Tellicherry (now Thalassery), in what was then part of the Madras Presidency but is now in Kerala State. He made his Ranji Trophy debut for Kerala in August 1969, against Andhra, and went on to play three more matches during the 1969–70 season. In the final two matches of his debut season, he recorded what were to be the two highest scores of his first-class career – 29 not out against Mysore, from ninth in the batting order, and then 33 against Madras, after being promoted to sixth. Gopalakrishnan had little batting success in the two other Ranji seasons he played for Kerala. During the 1970–71 season, he appeared in three matches, but recorded three ducks to finish with only two runs from five innings, at an average of 0.40. Gopalakrishnan was not selected at all the following season, but returned for three matches during the 1972–73 season, where his three matches yielded 19 runs from five innings.

Gopalakrishnan's father, P. M. Anandan, and uncle, P. M. Raghavan, both played at first-class level for Travancore-Cochin, Kerala's predecessor. Two of his cousins, brothers P. M. K. Raghunath and P. M. K. Mohandas, played for Kerala in the 1970s, with Mohandas and Gopalakrishnan playing several matches together. Outside of playing cricket, the family have been prominent in the baking trade in Kerala. In 2013, Gopalakrishnan was one of sixteen ex-Ranji players who received a one-off endowment from the Kerala Cricket Association in recognition of their service during the sport's amateur period. After retiring from playing, he had been the match referee for a Ranji game between Mumbai and Orissa during the 1997–98 season, in what was his only recorded appearance as a match official in a high-level game.
