= P. M. K. Mohandas =

Indian cricketer

Personal information
- Full name: Ponnambath Mambally Krishnan Mohandas
- Born: 31 January 1948; Mahé, French India
- Died: 17 October 2004 (aged 56); Thiruvananthapuram, Kerala, India
- Batting: Right-handed
- Bowling: Right-arm medium-fast
- Relatives: P. M. K. Raghunath (brother); A. P. M. Gopalakrishnan (cousin); P. M. Raghavan (uncle); P. M. Anandan (uncle)

Domestic team information
- Years: Team
- 1972: Kerala

Career statistics
Competition	FC
Matches	3
Runs scored	51
Batting average	17.00
100s/50s	0/0
Top score	24
Balls bowled	120
Wickets	3
Bowling average	24.00
5 wickets in innings	0
10 wickets in match	0
Best bowling	3/33
Catches/stumpings	1/–
- Source: CricketArchive, 21 July 2015

Ponnambath Mambally Krishnan Mohandas (31 January 1948 – 17 October 2004) was an Indian cricketer who played at first-class level for Kerala during the 1972–73 season. He was a right-handed batsman and right-arm medium-fast bowler.

Mohandas was born in Mahé, in what was then part of French India but is now a district of the Union Territory of Puducherry. He played state-level schools cricket for Kerala, which borders Mahé, in the early 1960s, but did not play for the senior team until October 1972, when he made his Ranji Trophy debut against Andhra. Mohandas's first match was the first Ranji match of the season for Kerala, and he was one of eight debutants from both sides in a game where play was possible only on two days. He opened the bowling with Mohammed Ibrahim in Andhra's only innings without taking a wicket, but when coming in as a number-eleven batsman scored 24 runs out of a 29-run last-wicket stand with Ponmanichi Mackey. In the next match, against Hyderabad, Mohandas took 3/33 to be Kerala's best bowler in the first innings, as the side slumped to a 10-wicket loss. Given only four overs against Mysore (now Karnataka), he went wicketless as his side was defeated within two days, and was then dropped for Kerala's final match of the season, against Tamil Nadu.

In October 2004, at the age of 56, Mohandas died at his Thiruvananthapuram residence of a "massive heart attack". P. M. K. Raghunath, his younger brother, also played first-class cricket for Kerala, making his debut during the 1973–74 season. Their father, P. M. Krishnan, had had a longstanding involvement with what is now the Kerala Cricket Association. A teammate of Mohandas in all three of his first-class appearances was his cousin, A. P. M. Gopalakrishnan, whose father, P. M. Raghavan, and uncle, P. M. Anandan (both uncles of Mohandas and his brother), each played at first-class level for Travancore-Cochin, Kerala's predecessor. Outside of cricket, the family's business was baking.
