= K. C. Akshay =

Indian cricketer

Personal information
- Born: 15 May 1996 (age 30); Kozhikode, Kerala, India
- Batting: Right-handed
- Bowling: Left-arm off-break
- Role: Bowler

Domestic team information
- Years: Team
- 2017-present: Kerala
- Source: ESPNcricinfo, 1 November 2017

K. C. Akshay (born 15 May 1996) is an Indian cricketer who represents Kerala in domestic cricket. He is a right-handed batsman and left-arm off-spiner.

== Domestic career ==
KC Akshay was born on 15 May 1996 in Kozhikode district of Kerala. Trained at the KCA academy in Thiruvananthapuram from the age of 16, he has represented Kerala in different age-limit levels.

He made his first-class debut for Kerala in the 2017–18 Ranji Trophy on 1 November 2017 after being called up to the squad after Akshay Chandran was sent for remodeling of bowling action. As a debutant, he bagged four wickets in the first innings and five in second innings finishing with a match haul of 9/58. He took another 9 wicket haul in the same season against Vidarbha in a losing cause on the quarter-final of the tournament. The bowling effort of the spin-trio including him, debutant Sijomon Joseph and veteran Jalaj Saxena was fundamental in Kerala's first ever quarter-final entry in the season. He finished with 22 wickets from six innings'.

He made his List A debut for Kerala in the 2017–18 Vijay Hazare Trophy on 7 February 2018.

In August 2018, he was one of eight players that were fined by the Kerala Cricket Association, after showing dissent against Kerala's captain, Sachin Baby.

He played for KCA Eagles in the 2020–21 season of the KCA President's Cup T20.
