= Rohan Kunnummal =

Indian cricketer (born 1998)

Personal information
- Full name: Rohan Sushil Kunnummal
- Born: 10 May 1998 (age 28); Palakkad, Kerala, India
- Batting: Right-handed
- Bowling: Right-arm off-break
- Role: Opening batter

Domestic team information
- Years: Team
- 2017–present: Kerala (squad no. 10)

Career statistics
Competition	FC	LA	T20
Matches	28	37	33
Runs scored	1,828	1,477	1,015
Batting average	42.51	44.75	35.00
100s/50s	4/11	4/7	1/6
Top score	143	134	101*
Catches/stumpings	24/0	13/0	14/0
- Source: Cricinfo, 4 October 2024

Rohan Sushil Kunnummal (born 10 May 1998) is an Indian cricketer who represents Kerala in domestic cricket. He is a right-handed opening batter and occasional right-arm offbreak bowler.

== Early life ==
Rohan was born on 10 May 1998 in Palakkad district of Kerala to Sushil S. Kunnummal, an entrepreneur and Krishna M, a Bank Manager. He has a younger sister, Jitha. He was brought up on Koyilandi, Kozhikode.

He was initially trained under his father, a cricket enthusiast and former cricketer. At the age of nine, he started training at Sussex Cricket Academy, Kozhikode, under coach Santhosh Kumar. He pursued a B.A. degree in English literature from Malabar Christian College, Kozhikode.

== Career ==
=== Youth cricket ===
He has represented Kerala in U-14, U-16, U-19 and U-25 competitions. He scored a 162 against Goa in the 2016-17 Vinoo Mankad Trophy inter-state tournament playing for Kerala. He scored an unbeaten 253* against Delhi U-19 team in the 2016-17 Cooch Behar Trophy. He represented India Green in the 2016–17 U-19 Challenger Trophy.

His performances in Cooch Behar Trophy and Vinoo Mankad Trophy gained Rohan a spot in India under-19 cricket team squad to play the five-match one-day series against England under-19 cricket team starting on 30 January 2017. But he was later removed from the squad as the Board of Control for Cricket in India (BCCI) decided to let only those players who would be eligible to play the 2018 Under-19 Cricket World Cup to take part in the series. He was part of the Indian U-19 side to play the Youth Test series against England U-19 held in February 2017.

=== Domestic career ===
In July 2017, he was named in Kerala's squad to play the KSCA Trophy. Rohan made his List A debut for Kerala in the 2016–17 Vijay Hazare Trophy on 3 March 2017. He made his Twenty20 debut for Kerala in the 2018–19 Syed Mushtaq Ali Trophy on 28 February 2019. He made his first-class debut on 19 January 2020, for Kerala in the 2019–20 Ranji Trophy.

He featured in the Kerala XI for 2021-22 Syed Mushtaq Ali Trophy after an injury to veteran Robin Uthappa and finished the tournament as Kerala's second-highest run-scorer, hitting 168 runs from 5 matches including two half-centuries. He continued his good form in the Vijay Hazare Trophy season that followed, scoring 264 runs from 6 matches and top-scored the Kerala batters. He scored his maiden first class century against Meghalaya in the opening day of the 2021-22 Ranji Trophy. In the next match against Gujarat, he scored centuries in both the innings' becoming the second Kerala batter after Sambasiva Sarma to achieve the feat. He also became the first Kerala player to score three consecutive hundreds in Ranji Trophy.

In August 2022, he was named in the South Zone's team for the 2022-23 Duleep Trophy. In his debut match for the team, he scored a century in the first innings and followed it with a half century in the second.

In November 2022, he earned his maiden call-up to India A team for Bangladesh tour.

== Playing style ==
Rohan is an attacking opening batsman, who is particularly aggressive against spin bowling. Former Indian cricketer Tinu Yohannan noted him as a "match-winner" and praised his hand-eye coordination.
