= S Ramesh (cricketer) =

Indian cricketer (born 1954)

S.Ramesh
Personal information
- Full name: Subramaniam Ramesh
- Born: 17 May 1954; Palakkad, Kerala
- Role: Right-hand batsman Right-arm medium pace Cricket Administrator
- Relatives: S Santosh (brother); S Rajesh (brother)
- Source: Cricinfo, 29 October 2020

Subramaniam Ramesh, popularly known as S.Ramesh is an Indian cricketer, who has represented Kerala in 56 first-class matches, as an all rounder between 1977 and 1990. Ramesh, has also captained the state. He, along with his cricketer brothers S.Santosh and S Rajesh, played an integral role in making Kerala cricket team, a notable one of South India in 80's. Ramesh is also a cricket administrator at KCA.
