= Sakthan Thampuran Nagar =

CBD in Thrissur, Kerala, India

Coordinates: 10.5141°N 76.2159°E

- CBD
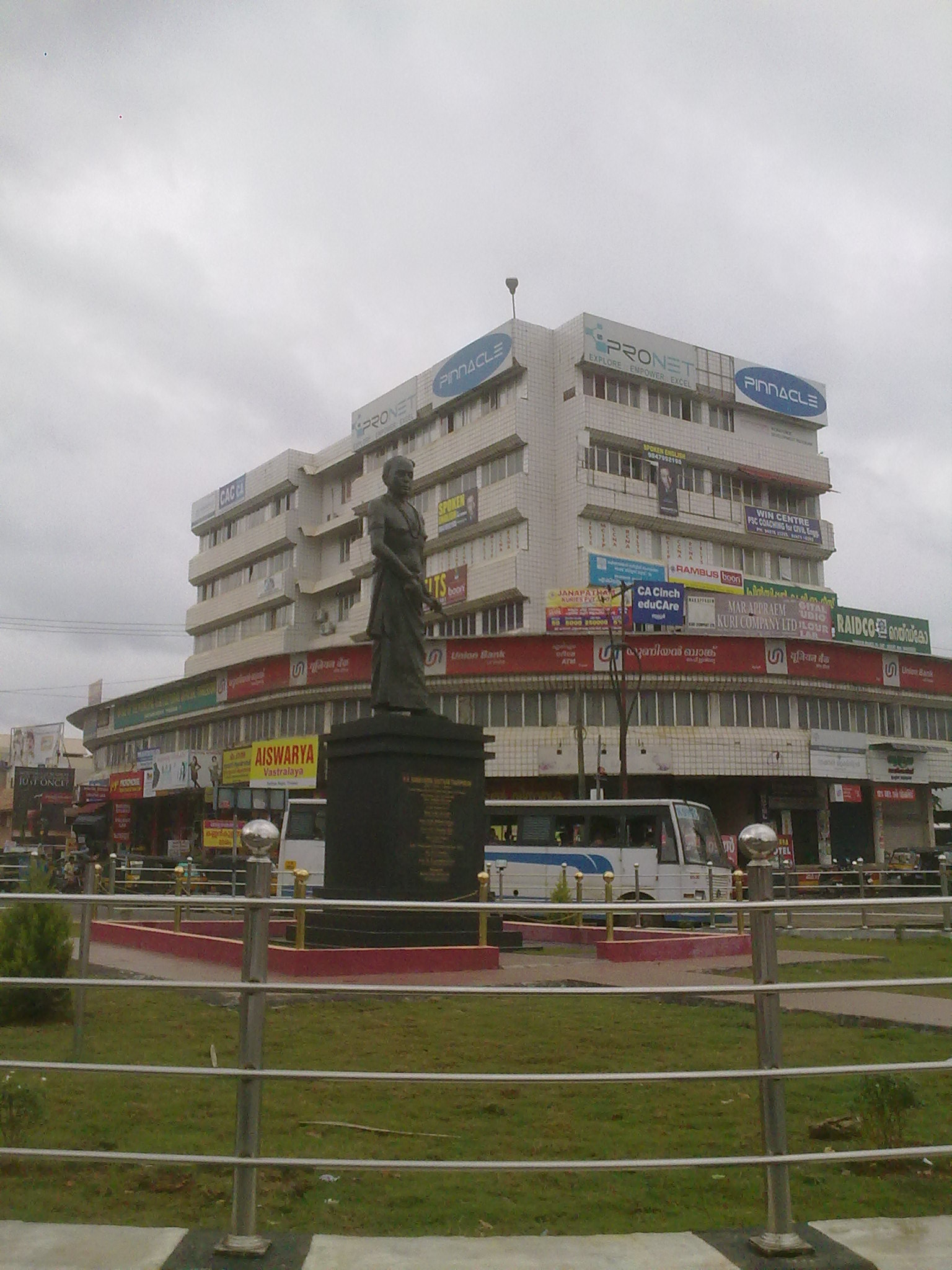
- Statue of Shakthan Thampuran in ST Nagar
- Interactive map of Sakthan Thampuran Nagar
- Country: India
- State: Kerala
- District: Thrissur

Languages
  - Official: Malayalam, English
- Time zone: UTC+5:30 (IST)
- Vehicle registration: KL-8

Sakthan Thampuran Nagar (S.T Nagar) is one of the business districts of Thrissur city in Kerala state, South India. It was named after King of the Cochin, Sakthan Thampuran, the very architect of Thrissur.

== History ==
Two decades ago, the place which is now called Sakthan Thampuran Nagar was a vast paddy field. Due to the arrival of Pope John Paul II, the paddy field was converted to this form. Now it has become a major commercial hub in city. Later, after the departure of Pope John Paul II, then Thrissur District Collector Vinod Rai developed and built Shaktan Thampuran Private Bus Stand.

== Important places ==
The second largest private bus station in Kerala is situated here. S.T Nagar houses several economic and government administrative and private companies' offices (mostly government offices like banks). Thrissur Municipal Corporation is planning set up a convention centre with a capacity to accommodate 2,000 persons at Sakthan Thampuran Nagar. The corporation would be setting up a decorated 'Town Square' at Sakthan Thampuran Nagar. A statue of Sakthan Thampuran, the ruler of the erstwhile princely State of Kochi who contributed immensely for the development of Thrissur, is erected at the 'Town Square' in 2020. A sky-walk at Sakthan Nagar was planned in 2021 and Rs.30 crore was sanctioned for a new Corporation building in Sakthan Nagar.

- Shaktan Thampuran Private Bus Stand, Thrissur
- Thrissur Skywalk
- South Indian Bank headquarters
- Trichur Heart Hospital
- Thrissur Vegetable Market
- Balya Children Hospital
- Thrissur City Traffic Police Headquarters
- Thrissur Police Club
- Thrissur Fire Force Station
- LIC Area Office
- Thrissur Fish Market

== See also ==
- Thrissur
- Thrissur Skywalk
- Thrissur District
