= Thrissur Skywalk =

Skywalk in Thrissur, Kerala

Thrissur skywalk തൃശൂർ ആകാശ നടപ്പാത
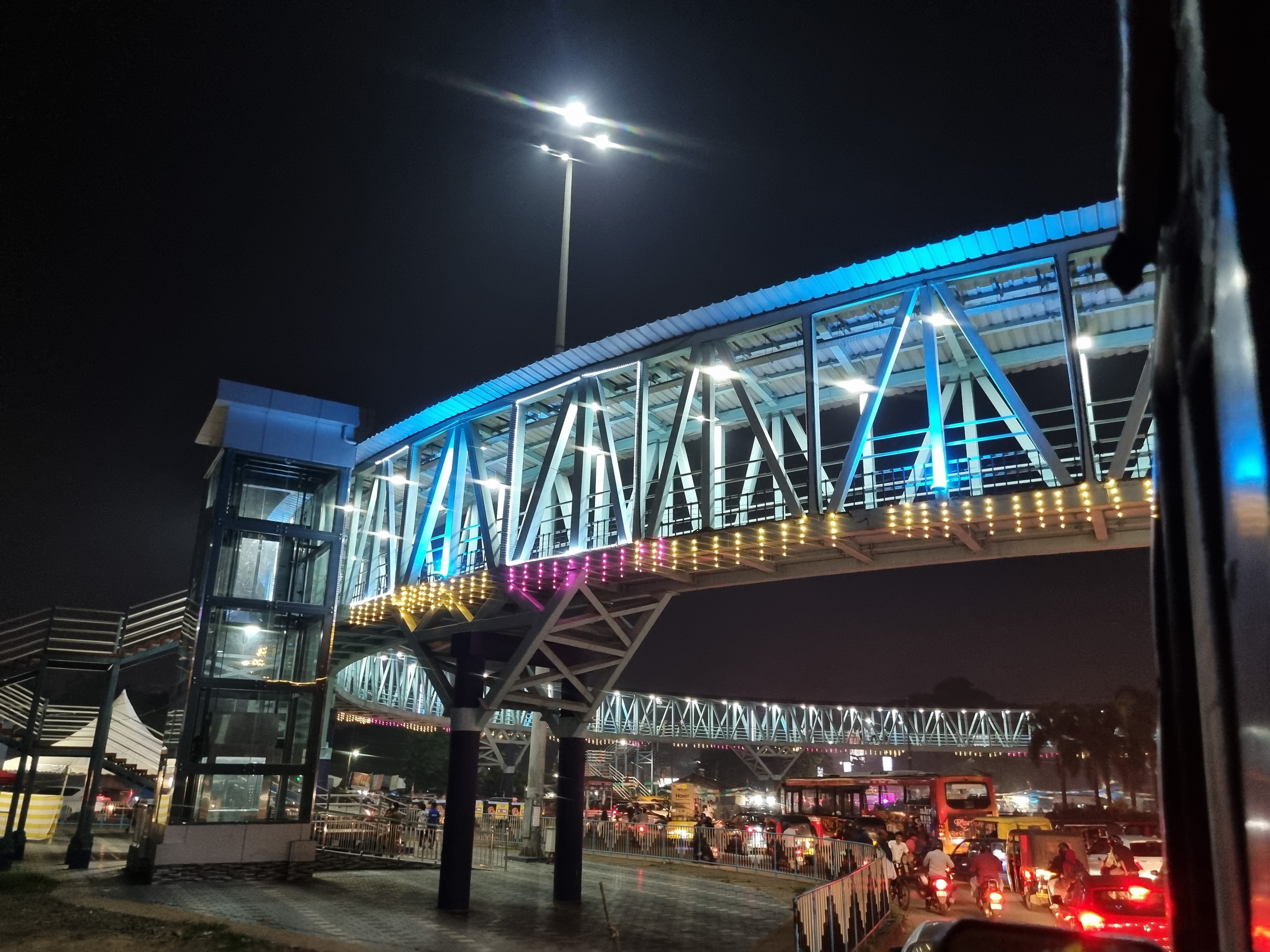
- Crosses: Sakthan Thampuran Nagar
- Locale: Thrissur, Kerala, India
- Official name: Sakthan Nagar skywalk
- Other name: Thrissur skywalk

Characteristics
- Material: Iron
- Total length: 279 m
- Width: 3 m

History
- Construction start: 2018
- Construction cost: ₹80 million (2023)
- Opened: 15 August 2023

The Thrissur skywalk or the Sakthan Nagar skywalk is a skywalk for pedestrians, that connects the four roads intersecting at Sakthan Thampuran Nagar in Thrissur, Kerala, India. Constructed in a circular shape, it is the longest skywalk in Kerala, having a circumference of 279-metre. It was opened to public in August 2023.

== Overview ==
Shaktan Nagar is one of the major hubs in Thrissur city. A circular skywalk that connects the four roads that meet here was built here at a cost of eight crore rupees under the Amrit project. The skywalk connects the old Pattalam-Shaktan Thampuran Nagar Road, Ring Road, Shaktan Nagar Road and Shaktan Thampuran High Road. Its construction was started in 2018 and was opened to public on 15 August 2023. It is built six meters above the road in a circular shape, so that the vehicles can also pass without hindrance. It is three meters in width and the circumference is 280 meters. There is steel armor around the structure. The skywalk can be accessed via steps from four areas of the city; the Sakthan bus stand area, fish market, vegetable market and Sakthan Nagar ground. It also has two lifts that are helpful for the physically challenged. As a second phase of the project, there are plans to provide two lifts, solar system, full glass cladding cover and air conditioning at the skywalk.
