= Sony Cheruvathur =

Indian cricketer (born 1978)

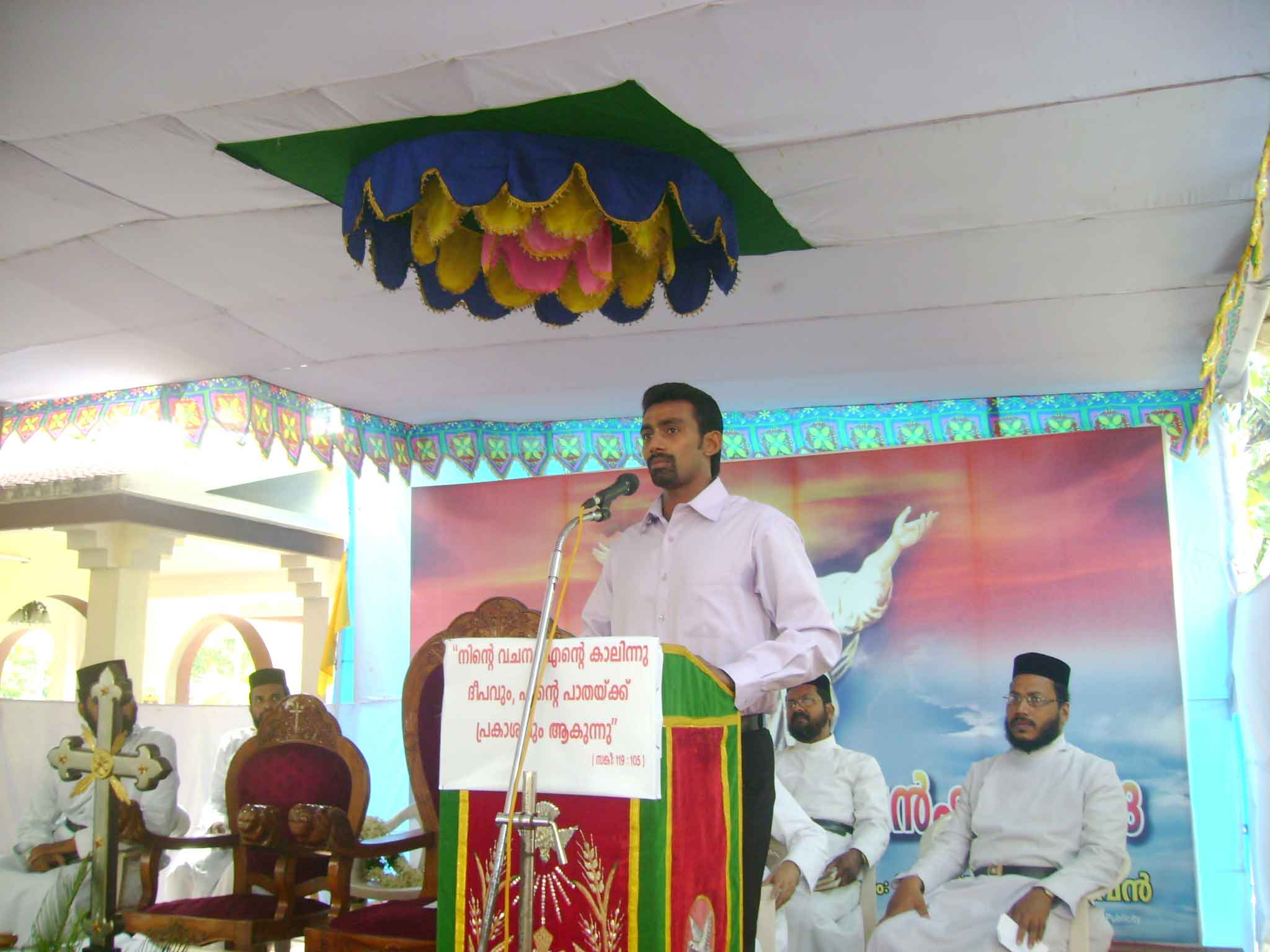
- Sony Cheruvathoor speaking at Chengannur Bhadrasana convention in a youth meeting of the orthodox church on 7 February 2008

Personal information
- Full name: Sony Kuriakose Cheruvathur
- Born: 26 August 1978 (age 48); Chengannur, Kerala, India
- Batting: Right-handed
- Bowling: Right-arm medium-fast
- Role: All-rounder

Domestic team information
- Years: Team
- 2001/02 – 2012/13: Kerala

Career statistics
Competition	FC	LA	T20
Matches	36	15	5
Runs scored	888	197	25
Batting average	19.73	16.41	6.25
100s/50s	1/3	0/1	0/0
Top score	104	80	20
Balls bowled	6592	638	96
Wickets	118	16	3
Bowling average	24.33	35.87	38.00
5 wickets in innings	9	0	0
10 wickets in match	2	0	0
Best bowling	7/30	4/38	2/21
Catches/stumpings	11/0	2/0	0/0
- Source: Cricinfo, 18 June 2021

Sony Kuriakose Cheruvathur (born 26 August 1978) is a former Indian cricketer who played for Kerala in domestic cricket. He is an all-rounder who plays as a right-handed middle order batsman and right arm medium-fast bowler.

He made his List A debut in the 2001/02 season. He made his first-class debut for Kerala on 15 November 2003 in the 2003–04 Ranji Trophy against Railways. He made his Twenty20 debut for Kerala in the 2006-07 Inter-state Twenty-20 tournament on 3 April 2007 against Karnataka.

He has led Kerala in the 2007, 2008 and 2012 seasons of Ranji Trophy. He is the fastest player to take 100 wickets for Kerala and the only second Kerala player to take a hat-trick after S Sreesanth.
