= Acharath Babu =

Indian cricketer (1936–2018)

Personal information
- Born: 2 July 1936; Thalasserry, Kerala, India
- Died: 10 April 2018 (aged 81); Kannur, Kerala
- Batting: Right-handed
- Bowling: Right-handed medium-fast
- Role: All-rounder

Domestic team information
- Years: Team
- 1953—1957: Travancore-Cochin
- 1957—1966: Kerala
- Source: ESPNcricinfo, 6 February 2021

Acharath Babu (2 June 1936 – 10 April 2018) was an Indian cricketer who represented Travancore-Cochin cricket team and Kerala cricket team in domestic cricket. He is a right-handed batsman and right-arm medium-pacer.

== Career ==
Born at Thalassery, Babu started playing for the Travancore-Cochin cricket team in 1953 before representing Kerala cricket team after the formation of the state. He scored 202 runs and scalped six wickets for Kerala from 14 first-class matches between 1957 and 1966. Kerala cricket team recorded its first Ranji Trophy victory on a home ground under Babu's captaincy. A right arm medium pacer, Babu represented Kerala for 10 seasons and played 16 matches. He debuted against Andhra Pradesh in 1956-57 Ranji Trophy season and played his last match against Hyderabad in 1965–66 season. Babu also captained the state in five Ranji Trophy matches during the 1963-64 domestic season beginning with the match against Madras cricket team at the Little Flower High School ground in Salem. He also led the side against Mysore cricket team in then Bangalore, Hyderabad cricket team in Kozhikode and Madras in his hometown Thalassery that season. But his biggest moment as captain came against Andhra Pradesh at the Municipal Stadium in Thalassery on December 14–17, 1963 - a match which Kerala won by four wickets to register their first home victory in Ranji trophy. After his playing days, Babu took on the roles of coach, selector and manager. He coached the Calicut University cricket team for 22 years from 1972. He also was selector and chief coach of Indian universities’ team, selector of Kerala junior and senior teams, Kerala team manager for five terms and manager of the south zone team for the VC trophy. Another post Babu held was chairman of the Nets and Coaching Centre of the Kerala Cricket Association. The all-rounder was married to the sister of former union minister E Ahamed, Ramla Beevi. The couple have three children, Saira Banu, Rasheeda Banu and Mushtaq Ali. He died in Kannur on 10 April 2018 aged 82.
