= Udiramala Subramaniam =

Indian cricketer (1947–2016)

Personal information
- Born: 2 March 1947; Trivandrum, India
- Died: 28 November 2016 (aged 69); Thiruvananthapuram, India
- Source: ESPNcricinfo, 5 January 2017

Udiramala Subramaniam (2 March 1947 – 28 November 2016) was an Indian cricketer. He played six first-class matches for Kerala between 1970/71 and 1976/77.

== See also ==
- List of Kerala cricketers
