= Kidangoor, Kottayam =

Kidangoor
- Village
- Location in Kerala, India Kidangoor (India)
- Coordinates: 9°40′0″N 76°36′0″E
- Country: India
- State: Kerala
- District: Kottayam

Population (2011)
  - Total: 25,170
- Demonym: Kidangoorkaar

Languages
  - Official: Malayalam, English
- Time zone: UTC+5:30 (IST)
- PIN: 686572 & 686583
- Telephone code: 04822
- Vehicle registration: KL-35
- Coastline: 0 kilometres (0 mi)
- Nearest city: Palai
- Lok Sabha constituency: Kottayam
- Climate: Tropical monsoon (Köppen)
- Avg. summer temperature: 35 °C (95 °F)
- Avg. winter temperature: 27 °C (81 °F)

Kidangoor is a village in Kottayam district, in Kerala. It is located between the two major towns in Kottayam District, Kottayam and Pala.

== Geography ==
The Meenachil River flows through the heart of Kidangoor Village. The village is mentioned in many old manuscripts and is believed to have been existed in at least the 4th century.

== Education ==
The village was once a centre for education for the nearby villages as it had one lower primary school and two high schools 75 years ago. The first library in this village was established in 1927 by socialist Irittukuziyil Paramupilla who built NSS high school. The literacy rate is very high as this small village has three secondary schools and three lower primary schools in the vicinity. There is also an engineering college called College of Engineering Kidangoor (CEK) under CAPE following KTU syllabus.

== Religion ==
[Kidangoor Subramanya Temple], believed to be more than 2000 years old, is located in Kidangoor as well as the Pirayar Sivakulangara Temple, St. Sebastian's Church Mangalaram (Pala Diocese) and St Mary's Knanaya Catholic Church.

=== Subramanya Swamy Temple ===
Southern Kidangoor has the Subramaniya Swamy Temple, a very old temple on the banks of the river. It is believed that the idol of Subramanya Swamy came out of the 'Kamandulu' (pot) carried by Maharshi Gauna when it tilted and the water flowed out. Along with the flow of the water, the vigraha was carried away to the Vishnukshetra in Kidangur. Inside the temple where a new Sreekovil was built for Lord Vishnu, the temple officials felt the presence of Subramanya Swamy, and so they kept the Subramanya Vigraha there instead of Vishnu. So, along with the Vishnu Vigraha on the northern side, the Subramanya Vigraha was also consecrated in the new Sreekovil.

One more legend is associated with the formation of Subramanya temple. The temple was created to do the 'pratishta' (positioning the idol) for Lord Vishnu. The same morning when the 'pratishta' was supposed to occur, a person (believed as Lord Subramanya) was asking for lift to cross the Meenachil river and to reach the bank of the river where the temple is located. A person who was carrying salt in his 'vanchi' (a wooden boat used for travelling in water) gave lift to him. The temple people who arrived to do the 'pratishta' saw Lord Subramanya inside the Sreekovil and decided to perform Subramanya 'prathista' there as a new Sreekovil has been constructed later for the Vishu 'pratishta'. It is believed that the Subramanya idol is in standing position because the god has been seen by the priest before he get enough time to sit. The story also say that the salt inside the boat which Subramanya used to cross the river was not ending upon measuring it.

The Temple houses a Koothambalam. Bharata Muni's concept of Natya Shastra is evident in the sculptural work inside the Kuthambalam, as it is different from all other Kuthambalams of various temples of Kerala. It is believed that the Kuthambalam was constructed by Perunthachan. The scenes from Ramayana and Mahabharatha are sculptured on the Rangamandapam of the Kuthambalam. There is a huge pillar curved out of the wood of "Kurumthotti" - a medicinal plant. Inside the hall there is a vigraha of Devi Bhuvaneswari. Women are not allowed to enter the Kuthambalam and the 'Nalambalam'. 'Koothu' and 'Koodiyattom' are performed inside the Koothambalam. A special performance of 'Brahmachari Koothu' is conducted only in this temple as this is for the benefit of those who have no children. Mahamaya Devi, enshrined in the Kuthambalam facing south is well known as Kuthambalathil Amma. 'Guruthi' is performed for the Devi inside the Kuthambalam by devotees for the removal of all their problems and for the destruction of enemies. During the Annual Festival, Chakiyar Koothu is conducted regularly.

=== St. Mary's Church ===
Northern Kidangoor is home to St. Mary's Church Kidangoor. St. Mary's Church is the parish forane of the Knanaya community. Little Lourdes Hospital in Kidangoor, run by the Visitation Nuns, is a famous hospital on the Pala Highway.

== Festivals ==
The main festival is in the month of Kumbha (February, March). It starts on the day of Karthika and lasts for 10 days. The Trikarthika of the month of Vrichika (November–December) and the Thaipooyam of the month of Makara (Jan-Feb) are other important festivals. Many people come to the temple to perform Shastivrata on 6th day after the Amavasya, which is considered auspicious.

== Trade ==
Several types of imported goods are available in Kidangoor. Also being on the Pala-Ettumanoor road, you can find most of the daily use items available in markets.

== Hospitals ==
Little Lourdes Mission hospital is one of the main hospitals in Kidangoor.

== Notable people ==
- Mamitha Baiju, actress
- P.K. Vasudevan Nair, former Chief Minister of Kerala
- Sijomon Joseph, Indian cricketer
