= Sakthan Thampuran Bio-Waste Treatment Plant =

Bio-waste plant in Kerala, India

- Country: India
- Location: Sakthan Thampuran Nagar, Thrissur
- Commission date: May, 2013
- Operator: Thrissur Municipal Corporation

Thermal power station
- Primary fuel: Waste

Sakthan Thampuran Bio-Waste Treatment Plant is the first bio-waste plant in Kerala, India, that uses organic waste converter technology to convert waste into manure. It is situated in Sakthan Thampuran Nagar, Thrissur city. The plant process vegetable waste generated in Sakthan Thampuran market.

== Facility ==
The converter was set up at a cost of Rs 98 lakh on 45 cents of land at the Sakthan Thampuran market. The plant can process 4 tonnes of waste a day and the converter has the facility to grind 25 kilograms of waste in 10 to 12 minutes. The plant produces manure from the waste without smell which is being sold to public in packets weighing 2 kg. Also it is taken to Kerala Agricultural University and the left over segregation are burned in an incinerator.
