= Shakti Singh (cricketer) =

Indian cricketer (born 1968)

Personal information
- Born: 19 May 1968 (age 58); Mandi, Himachal Pradesh, India
- Batting: Right-handed
- Bowling: Right-arm medium-fast

Domestic team information
- Years: Team
- 1987/88–2002/03: Himachal Pradesh
- 1993/94–1996/97: Delhi

Career statistics
Competition	FC	List A
Matches	58	28
Runs scored	1,416	124
Batting average	17.26	6.88
100s/50s	1/3	0/0
Top score	128	27
Balls bowled	10,715	1,400
Wickets	200	36
Bowling average	26.09	24.66
5 wickets in innings	16	0
10 wickets in match	3	n/a
Best bowling	7/37	3/27
Catches/stumpings	13/–	2/–
- Source: ESPNcricinfo, 10 January 2016

Shakti Singh (born 19 May 1968) is an Indian first-class cricketer turned playback singer. He played cricket for Himachal Pradesh and Delhi. After retirement, he became a match referee and Bollywood playback singer.

== Life and career ==
Singh played as a bowling all-rounder who batted right-handed and bowled right-arm medium-fast. In a playing career that spanned 16 seasons, he appeared in 58 first-class and 28 List A matches playing mainly for Himachal Pradesh and Delhi. In 1991, he was sent to Australia to train under Dennis Lillee. He is best known for his knock of 128 for Himachal Pradesh against Haryana in the 1990–91 Ranji Trophy. In the innings, he hit 14 sixes, an Indian first-class record, and also broke the record of fastest fifty in Ranji Trophy, reaching the mark in just 18 balls. This record was surpassed by Bandeep Singh, in 2015, who reached his fifty in 15 balls.

Singh became a match referee after retirement. He also started a career as playback singer in 2006. He has sung for Bollywood films such as Mera Dil Leke Dekho, Atithi Tum Kab Jaoge?, Life Partner, Patiala House and Kab Tak. He has worked with music composers such as Shankar–Ehsaan–Loy and Pritam Chakraborty.
