= Hari Devarajan =

Indian cricketer (born 1934)

Personal information
- Full name: Hari Devarajan
- Born: 16 July 1934 (age 92); Ernakulam, Kerala
- Role: Right-hand batsman Wicket keeper

Domestic team information
- Years: Team
- 1967-68 to 1977-78: Kerala
- Source: ESPNcricinfo, 12 July 2021

Hari Devarajan, popularly known as H Devaraj, is an Indian cricketer, who has played 38 first-class matches between 1954 and 1968 for Kerala. Devaraj played as a wicket keeper batsman and has scored more than 1000 runs. As per CM Ashok Sekhar, former Kerala captain, Devaraj, could have even played for India if he was with some stronger teams.
