= Trichur Heart Hospital =

Geography
- Location: Thrissur, Kerala, India
- Coordinates: 10°30′46″N 76°12′53″E

History
- Founded: 28 October 1992

Links
- Website: http://www.trichurheart.com/
- Lists: Hospitals in India

Trichur Heart Hospital is a 500-bed speciality hospital situated in Thrissur, Kerala, India. The hospital is equipped with most modern cardiac catheterisation lab ensuring detailed study of chambers, valves, coronary arteries, and blood flow details. The hospital specializes in neurology, general medicine, general surgery, orthopedics, gynecology, anaesthesiology, neonatology, pathology and histopathology, dermatology and physiotherapy.

== History ==
The hospital's foundation stone was laid on 7 February 1986. Later on 28 October 1992, former President of India, Sankar Dayal Sharma inaugurated the first phase of the hospital.
