= SP Mullick =

Indian cricketer (born 1940)

Personal information
- Full name: Sudhir Pal Mullick
- Born: 13 April 1940 (age 86); West Pakistan
- Role: Right-hand batsman Right-arm off-break
- Source: Cricinfo, 2 July 2021

Sudhir Pal Mullick, popularly known as SP Mullick, is an Indian cricketer, who has played 33 first-class matches between 1960 and 1971 for Kerala. Born in West Pakistan, Mullick played as an all rounder scoring 1108 runs with the highest score of 130 against Madras at Thalassery in 1964 and claiming a career haul of 29 wickets.
