= K. S. Neelakantan Unni =

Indian writer

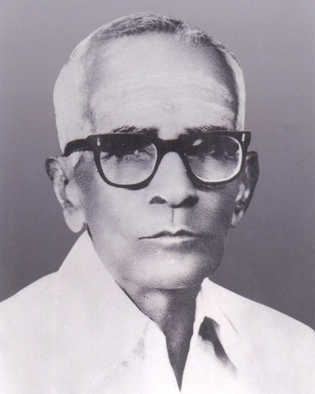
- Born: 1895; Olassa, British India
- Died: 1980 (aged 84–85); Kerala
- Occupations: writer, translator, scholar, educator

K. S. Neelakantan Unni (1895-1980) was a renowned Malayalam writer and Sanskrit scholar - translator from Kerala, India. He was born into a family called Kavil Madam in a village Olassa in Kottayam District of Kerala, India. This family is associated to the ThekkumKoor royal dynasty as their Asan or Guru (who initiates someone into the world of letters by a ritual called vidyarambham)

== Early life and education ==
Neelakantan Unni completed preliminary studies in Sanskrit and Malayalam under the supervision of Kannampally Mathu Asan, a local teacher and then joined Travancore Royal Sanskrit College. He earned the degrees Shasthry and Mahopadhyaya from this college.

== Career ==
After his education Unni joined different educational institutions and worked as a Malayalam Munshi for 35 years. He retired from M D Seminari High School, Kottayam.

Neelakantan Unni has written a number of books in Malayalam. He published several remarkable collections of legends related to temples, rituals and ancient traditions. He translated Kalidasa's Sanskrit texts of Abhijñānaśākuntalam and Meghadūta into Malayalam. One of his most famous works is Pancha Maha Nikhandu. Besides these, he has also written 3 attakkathas, the lyrics used for Kathakali.

He wrote a poetic biography of Muhammad in Sanskrit, called Vishuddha Nabi Charitham. Being an eminent Scholar in Sanskrit, "Ayodhya Sanskrit Parishad" honoured him with Sahitya Ratna and Vidyabhushan degrees. Neelakantan Unni died in 1980.

On 4 April 2011, D C Books released "Aithihyakathakal" as a compilation of Neelakantan Unni's collection of legends and is considered as the most important collection of its kind after 'Aithihyamala' by Kottarathil Sankunni.

== Important works ==
- Abhijnanasakuntalam (1970)
- Meghasandesham
- Vishuddha Nabi Charitham
- Pañcamahānighanṭu (1976)
