= Chandroth Vijayan =

Indian cricketer (born 1936)

Chandroth Vijayan (born 4 November 1936) was an Indian cricketer. He was a right-handed batsman who played for Kerala. He was born in Tellicherry.

== Career ==
Vijayan made a single first-class appearance for the side, during the 1957–58 season, against Andhra. From the lower order, he scored 10 runs in the first innings, and a single run in the second. Vijayan's brother, Chandroth Bhaskaran, played for Kerala and Madras in a twelve-year first-class career.
