= Bandeep Singh =

Indian cricketer (born 1989)

Personal information
- Born: 9 September 1989 (age 37); Jammu, India
- Batting: Right-handed
- Bowling: Legbreak googly

Domestic team information
- Years: Team
- 2012–present: Jammu & Kashmir
- Source: ESPNcricinfo, 30 October 2015

Bandeep Singh (born 9 September 1989) is an Indian first-class cricketer who plays for Jammu & Kashmir. In October 2015, he broke the record of Yusuf Pathan and Shakti Singh for the fastest 50 in the Ranji Trophy. He hit the half-century in 15 balls while the earlier record was in 18 balls.
