= Sonu Singh =

Indian cricketer (born 1995)

Personal information
- Born: 29 December 1995 (age 30); East Singhbhum, India
- Source: Cricinfo, 13 December 2015

Sonu Singh (born 29 December 1995) is an Indian cricketer who plays for Jharkhand. He made his first-class debut on 23 November 2015 in the 2015–16 Ranji Trophy. He made his Twenty20 debut on 7 January 2016 in the 2015–16 Syed Mushtaq Ali Trophy.
