= Siddharth Desai =

Indian cricketer (born 2000)

Personal information
- Full name: Siddharth Ajaybhai Desai
- Born: 16 August 2000 (age 26); Ahmedabad, Gujarat, India
- Batting: Left-handed
- Bowling: Slow left-arm orthodox
- Role: Bowler
- Source: Cricinfo, 10 April 2021

Siddharth Desai (born 16 August 2000) is an Indian cricketer. He made his first-class debut for Gujarat in the 2017–18 Ranji Trophy on 14 October 2017, taking his maiden five-wicket haul in the second innings, and being named man of the match.

In October 2018, he was the leading wicket-taker in the 2018 ACC Under-19 Asia Cup, with eighteen dismissals in five matches. The following month, he was named as one of eight players to watch ahead of the 2018–19 Ranji Trophy. In December 2018, he was named in India's team for the 2018 ACC Emerging Teams Asia Cup. He was the leading wicket-taker for Gujarat in the group-stage of the 2018–19 Ranji Trophy, with 23 dismissals in six matches. In November 2019, he was named in India's squad for the 2019 ACC Emerging Teams Asia Cup in Bangladesh.
