= S Santosh =

Indian cricketer (born 1962)

S.Santosh
Personal information
- Full name: Subramaniam Santosh
- Born: 22 February 1962 (age 64); Thiruvananthapuram, Kerala
- Role: Right-hand batsman Right-arm off break
- Relatives: S Ramesh (brother); S Rajesh (brother)
- Source: Cricinfo, 11 October 2020

Subramaniam Santosh, popularly known as S.Santosh is an Indian cricketer, who has played in 30 first-class matches between 1983 and 1992. He also played a World Cup warm up match representing South Zone against Australia in 1987. Santosh, an allrounder, was a prominent player of 80's Kerala cricket team and he, along with his cricketer brothers S.Ramesh and S.Rajesh, played an integral role in making Kerala team, a notable one of South India in 1980's. Santhosh is currently a board member of the Indian Cricketers Association and former Representative to the Apex Council of Kerala Cricket Association
