= Mohit Hooda =

Indian cricketer (born 1998)

Personal information
- Full name: Mohit Hooda
- Born: 19 August 1998 (age 28); Jhajjar, Haryana
- Batting: Right-handed
- Bowling: Leg-break

Domestic team information
- Years: Team
- 2015: Haryana
- Only FC: 23 November 2015 Haryana v Rajasthan
- Source: CricketArchive, 2 December 2015

Mohit Hooda (born 19 August 1998) is an Indian cricketer. He is a right-hand batsman and Leg-break bowler. He made his debut in first-class cricket in Ranji Trophy match on 23 November 2015 for Haryana against Rajasthan. He made his Twenty20 debut on 2 January 2016 in the 2015–16 Syed Mushtaq Ali Trophy.
