= Sijomon Joseph =

Indian cricketer (born 1997)

Personal information
- Born: 28 September 1997 (age 29); Kidangoor, Kerala, India
- Batting: Left-handed
- Bowling: Slow left arm orthodox
- Role: All-rounder

Domestic team information
- Years: Team
- 2017–present: Kerala (squad no. 28)
- Source: Cricinfo, 14 October 2017

Sijomon Joseph (born 28 September 1997) is an Indian cricketer who represents Kerala in domestic cricket. He is an all-rounder who bats left-handed and bowls left-arm offspin.

== Early life ==
Sijomon was born on 28 September 1997 in Kidangoor near Pala on Kottayam district of Kerala to Lisy and Joseph. He lost his father when he was one and a half years old. He was introduced to cricket by his brothers, Lijomon and Lijumon. He was initially a left-arm fast bowler who later switched to spin-bowling by the advice of his coach, Jeen K. John. He graduated high school from St. Antony's Public School, Kanjirapally. He graduated from Sacred Heart College, Thevara.

== Domestic career ==
Sijomon was the captain of Kerala at U-14, U-16 and U-19 levels. He took 41 wickets from six games in the 2017 Cooch Behar Trophy. Rewarding this performance, he was named in the Indian U-19 team to play two Youth Test matches against England U-19. He scored a half-century in the first innings of the first match and took a six-wicket haul in the second innings.

He made his first-class debut for Kerala on 14 October 2017 in the 2017–18 Ranji Trophy after being called up to the squad as an injury cover for Karaparambil Monish. Later that month in his second match, he took his maiden five-wicket haul in first-class cricket. The bowling effort of the spin-trio, including him, debutant KC Akshay and veteran Jalaj Saxena was fundamental in Kerala's first-ever quarter-final entry in the season. He finished with 19 wickets from eight innings'.

He made his Twenty20 debut on 14 January 2018 in the 2017–18 Syed Mushtaq Ali Trophy. In August 2018, he was one of eight players that were fined by the Kerala Cricket Association, after showing dissent against Kerala's captain, Sachin Baby.

Being promoted in the batting order, he scored a match-winning half-century in the quarter-final match of Kerala against Gujarat in the 2018-19 Ranji Trophy.

He made his List A debut on 26 September 2019, for Kerala in the 2019–20 Vijay Hazare Trophy. He captained KCA Royals to win the inaugural season of the KCA President's Cup T20.

He, along with Vishnu Vinod formed a record-breaking seventh-wicket of 174 runs, winning the match Kerala in the 2021-22 Vijay Hazare Trophy. He took a five-wicket haul in the next match of the tournament.
