= Kunal Datta (musician) =

Indian musician from New Delhi, India

Kunal Datta is an Indian musician from New Delhi, India. His style is largely acoustic and alternative rock. He is a singer-songwriter, and a multi-instrumentalist, playing an array of instruments including the guitar, harmonica, saxophone, violin, piano, drums, and the flute.

Datta has also written a book of poetry titled Rang-e-Noor: The Colours of the Light published by CinnamonTeal in 2009.

Datta was born in Los Angeles, California, in 1991, and later moved to New Delhi, where he attended Vasant Valley School. He is now at Stanford University pursuing a double major in engineering and music. He is signed with Pagal Haina Records.

== Discography ==
- Run Away – EP (2010)
- Dilli Bulaye – Single (2011)
