= Balan Pandit =

Indian cricketer (1926–2013)

Personal information
- Full name: Madhavan Balan Pandit
- Born: 16 June 1926; Koonammavu, India
- Died: 5 June 2013 (aged 86); Ernakulam, India
- Batting: Right-handed
- Bowling: Right-arm off-spin

Domestic team information
- Years: Team
- 1946-47 to 1948–49: Kathiawar
- 1951-52 to 1956–57: Travancore-Cochin
- 1958-59 to 1969–70: Kerala

Career statistics
Competition	First-class
Matches	46
Runs scored	2317
Batting average	29.70
100s/50s	5/6
Top score	262 not out
Balls bowled	572
Wickets	5
Bowling average	55.00
5 wickets in innings	0
10 wickets in match	0
Best bowling	3/144
Catches/stumpings	35/3
- Source: ESPNcricinfo, 23 December 2016

Balan Pandit (16 June 1926 – 5 June 2013) was an Indian cricketer. He played first-class cricket for Kathiawar, Kerala and Travancore-Cochin between 1946 and 1970.

His score of 262 not out against Andhra in 1959–60 remained a record for Kerala until the 2007–08 season.

Pandit served on India's junior selection committee and was the chairman of Kerala's selection committee. He also served as vice-president of Kerala Cricket Association.
