= Sachin Mohan =

Indian cricketer (born 1990)

Personal information
- Born: 10 April 1990 (age 36); Thycaud, Kerala, India
- Batting: Left-handed
- Bowling: Right-arm offbreak
- Role: Batsman

Domestic team information
- Years: Team
- Kerala
- Source: CricInfo, 19 December 2020

Sachin Mohan (born 4 October 1990) is an Indian cricketer who represents Kerala in domestic cricket. He is a left-handed opening batsman and right-arm offspinner who has played for Kerala in all junior state formats as well as Ranji Trophy, Vijay Hazare Trophy and Syed Musthaq Ali as well. Hailing from Trivandrum, he was a prolific run scorer for the state in age group categories and is well known for his slip catching.
