= Padmanabhan Sivadas =

Indian cricketer (born 1930)

Padmanabhan V Sivadas (born 25 November 1930) is an Indian retired cricketer. He was a left-handed batsman who played for Travancore-Cochin. He was born in Haripad.

== Career ==
Sivadas made a single first-class appearance for the team, during the 1951–52 season, against Mysore. From the lower order, he scored 5 runs in the first innings in which he batted, and a single run in the second, as Travancore-Cochin lost the match by an innings margin.
