= T. S. Mahadevan =

Indian cricketer (born 1957)

TS Mahadevan
Personal information
- Full name: Thrippunithura Surinarayanan Mahadevan
- Born: 13 May 1957 (age 69); Thrippunithura, Kochi, Kerala
- Role: Right-hand batsman Right-arm off-break

Domestic team information
- Years: Team
- 1979-80 to 1986-87: Kerala
- Source: Cricinfo, 26 June 2021

Thrippunithura Surinarayanan Mahadevan, popularly known as TS Mahadevan is an Indian cricketer, who played 19 first-class matches between 1979 and 1987 for Kerala. Mahadevan played as an off spinner and was the highest wicket taker for Kerala, in the 1985–86 Ranji Trophy season by picking up 18 wickets, with 8 for 108 as his best spell against Hyderabad.
