= Prashanth Menon =

Indian cricketer

Prashanth C Menon
Personal information
- Full name: Prashanth C Menon
- Born: 18 January 1977 (age 49); Chavakkad, Kerala, India
- Nickname: Prashanth
- Batting: Right-handed
- Bowling: Right-arm fast-medium
- Role: Bowler

Domestic team information
- Years: Team
- 1998–2002: Kerala

Career statistics
Competition	FC	List A
Matches	7	9
Runs scored	226	124
Batting average	17.38	17.71
100s/50s	0/2	0/1
Top score	63	64
Balls bowled	593	132
Wickets	9	3
Bowling average	38.11	43.66
5 wickets in innings	0	0
10 wickets in match	0	0
Best bowling	4/44	2/29
Catches/stumpings	1/–	0/–

Prashanth Chettuvatty Menon (born 18 January 1977 in Chavakkad, Kerala) is an Indian first class cricketer. He is a right handed lower order batsman and right arm fast medium bowler. He represents Kerala in Ranji Trophy. Together with Renjith Menon and Tinu Yohannan, Prashanth Menon formed a formidable pace trio, which revived the fortunes of the Kerala cricket team during the early 21st century.

== Early years ==
Prashanth was born in Chavakkad and brought up in Thrissur. He had completed his studies from St. Thomas College Thrissur where he was the Captain of the college cricket team.

== Playing career ==
With his consistent performance the state selectors picked him for the Kerala state team for the year 1998–99. Along with Former Indian pacer Tinu Yohannan and Renjith Menon he made lethal pace combination. Injuries and lack of form cut short what could have been a promising career. He last represented Kerala Ranji team was back in 2004. Now Prashanth is working with State Bank of India.
