= Kamlesh Thakor =

Indian cricketer (born 1992)

Personal information
- Born: 19 September 1992 (age 34); Gandhinagar, Gujarat
- Batting: Right handed
- Bowling: Left arm medium

Domestic team information
- Years: Team
- 2017–18: Gujarat
- Source: ESPNcricinfo, 25 November 2017

Kamlesh Thakor (Koli) (born 19 September 1992) is an Indian cricketer. He made his List A debut on 27 February 2014, for Gujarat in the 2013–14 Vijay Hazare Trophy. He made his first-class debut for Gujarat in the 2017–18 Ranji Trophy on 25 November 2017.
