= Vathsal Govind =

Indian cricketer (born 2000)

Personal information
- Born: 2 January 2000 (age 26); Delhi, India
- Batting: Right-handed
- Bowling: Right-arm leg spin
- Role: Batter

Domestic team information
- Years: Team
- 2018-present: Kerala

Career statistics
Competition	FC	LA
Matches	10	14
Runs scored	358	503
Batting average	32.54	50.30
100s/50s	1/0	0/3
Top score	106*	95*
Catches/stumpings	8/0	4/0
- Source: Cricinfo, 9 April 2025

Vathsal Govind (born 2 January 2000) is an Indian cricketer who represents Kerala in domestic cricket. He is a right-handed batsman and occasional left-arm leg break bowler.

== Early life ==
Vathsal was born on 2 January 2000 in Delhi to Govind Kanakan and Ruma Govind Sharma. He started playing cricket at the age of five. With limited opportunities to train at the academies he joined in Delhi, his mother set up a cricket academy in 2011. In 2015, Vathsal gained selection to the Delhi U-16 squad. A year later, Vathsal moved to Kerala for professional and personal reasons. As of 2018, he is a degree student at Sree Kerala Varma College, Thrissur.

== Domestic career ==
Vathsal was selected to play for Delhi U-16 team in 2015. In 2016, his family moved to Kerala where he continued his cricket career. He was part of the India Green team for U-19 Challenger Trophy 2018. He captained the Kerala U-19 team for Cooch Behar Trophy in the 2018–19 season and ended up being the top run-getter of the season with 1235 runs from 8 matches.

His performance in the Cooch Behar Trophy paved way to the Kerala squad for 2018-19 Ranji Trophy as a replacement to an injured Rohan Prem. He debuted for Kerala in first-class cricket on 14 December 2018 against Delhi in the same season. In February 2019, he along with his Kerala teammate Varun Nayanar was selected to play two Youth test matches for India U-19 against South Africa A.

He made his List A debut on 20 February 2021, for Kerala in the 2020–21 Vijay Hazare Trophy. He finished the tournament as Kerala's second-highest run-scorer with 292 runs from 5 matches, including career-best 95 against Karnataka. He captained KCA Tuskers on 2020–21 KCA President's Cup T20.

In the 2021–22 Ranji Trophy against, he scored his maiden century in first-class cricket Meghalaya.
