= S Rajesh =

Indian cricketer (1959–2009)

S.Rajesh
Personal information
- Full name: Subramaniam Rajesh
- Born: 13 November 1959; Palakkad, Kerala
- Died: 7 May 2009 (aged 49); Kowdiar, Thiruvananthapuram, Kerala
- Role: Right-hand batsman Right-arm medium pace Cricket selector
- Relatives: S Santosh (brother); S Ramesh (brother)
- Source: Cricinfo, 12 October 2020

Subramaniam Rajesh, popularly known as S.Rajesh, was an Indian cricketer, who has represented Kerala in 27 first-class matches between 1981 and 1989. Rajesh, captaining two matches, was an allrounder, along with his cricketer brothers S.Ramesh and S.Santosh, played an integral role in making Kerala cricket team, a notable one of South India in 80's. Rajesh has scored over 1000 runs including 7 half centuries and has also served the state as a selector.
