= C. M. Ashok Sekhar =

Indian cricketer (1946–2019)

CM Ashok Sekhar
Personal information
- Full name: C Madathil Ashok Sekhar
- Born: 1 February 1946; Dar es Salaam, Tanzania
- Died: 11 February 2019 (aged 73)
- Role: Right-hand batsman Wicket keeper Match referee

Domestic team information
- Years: Team
- 1967-68 to 1976-77: Kerala
- Source: ESPNcricinfo, 23 January 2022

C Madathil Ashok Sekhar, popularly known as CM Ashok Sekhar, was an Indian cricketer who played 35 first-class matches between 1967 and 1977 for Kerala. Sekhar played as a wicket-keeper, batsman and captained the Kerala team. Sekhar also served as a Match referee.
