= P. Ranganathan =

Indian cricketer (born 1964)

Personal information
- Full name: Padmanabha Ranganathan
- Born: 25 April 1964 (age 62); Thiruvananthapuram
- Batting: Right-handed
- Bowling: Right-arm medium
- Role: Batsman

Domestic team information
- Years: Team
- Kerala

Career statistics
Competition	First-class	List A
Matches	26	2
Runs scored	1,110	25
Batting average	26.42	12.50
100s/50s	1/6	0/0
Top score	101	25
Balls bowled	210	–
Wickets	1	–
Bowling average	142.00	–
5 wickets in innings	0	–
10 wickets in match	0	–
Best bowling	1/17	–
Catches/stumpings	12/–	0/–
- Source: ESPNcricinfo, 29 March 2019

Padmanabha Ranganathan, more commonly known as P. Ranganathan, (born 25 April 1964) is an Indian former first-class cricketer from the state of Kerala. He played as an opening batsman for Kerala cricket team in Ranji trophy. He is a BCCI level B coach and was appointed as the coach of Kerala team for 2010–11 season in May 2010. He has scored 1110 runs from 26 matches and has got a wicket. His highest score is 101.
