= Ponani Sunder =

Indian cricketer (born 1969)

Personal information
- Full name: Ponani Gopalakrishnan Sunder
- Born: 17 January 1969 (age 57)
- Source: Cricinfo, 17 March 2020

Ponani Sunder (born 17 January 1969) is an Indian cricketer. He played in 35 first-class and 6 List A matches for Kerala between 1988 and 1996. In February 2020, he was named in India's squad for the Over-50s Cricket World Cup in South Africa. However, the tournament was cancelled during the third round of matches due to the COVID-19 pandemic.
