= TS Venkitachalam =

Indian cricketer

TS Venkitachalam was an Indian cricketer. He was a right-handed batsman and right-arm medium-pace bowler who played for Kerala.

Venkitachalam made a single first-class appearance for the side, during the 1959–60 season, against Madras. From the opening order, he scored a duck in the first innings in which he batted, and, when switched to the lower order in the second innings, scored 2 runs.

Venkitachalam's son, Venkitachalam Manohar, also played for Kerala.
