= Acharath Mackey =

Indian cricketer

Acharath Mackey (born in Tellicherry) was an Indian cricketer. He was a right-handed batsman and leg-break bowler who played for Travancore-Cochin.

Mackey made a single first-class appearance for the team, against Mysore. From the tailend, he scored 2 runs in the first innings in which he batted, and 17 runs in the second, as Travancore-Cochin lost the match by an innings margin.
