= V Kamaruddin =

Indian cricketer (born 1972)

Personal information
- Full name: Veeran Basheer Kamaruddin
- Born: 11 April 1972 (age 54); Palakkad, Kerala
- Role: Right-hand batsman Wicketkeeper
- Source: Cricinfo, 5 February 2021

V Kamaruddin, popularly known as Kamaruddin is an Indian cricketer, who has played 64 first-class matches between 1993 and 2002 for Kerala. Kamaruddin played as the wicketkeeper and has scored only a 50 plus score as a batsman. Kamaruddin has effected six dismissals – four caught and two stumpings – in Hyderabad's first innings of 1996'97 Ranji Trophy match, thus became the 16th wicket keeper effecting six or more dismissals in Ranji Trophy match.
