= Sadanandan Anish =

Indian cricketer (born 1984)

Personal information
- Born: November 17, 1984 (age 41); Pathanamthitta, Kerala
- Nickname: kuttai
- Batting: Right-handed
- Bowling: Right-arm offbreak
- Role: Allrounder

Domestic team information
- Years: Team
- Kerala
- Source: CricInfo, 20 June 2021

Sadanandan Anish (born November 17, 1984) is an Indian cricketer from Pathanamthitta who plays domestic cricket for Kerala. He is a right handed batsman and right arm offspinner.
