= C. K. Bhaskaran =

Indian cricketer (1941–2020)

Personal information
- Full name: Chandroth Kalyadan Bhaskaran
- Born: 5 May 1941; Tellicherry, Kerala, India
- Died: 21 November 2020 (aged 79); Houston, Texas, United States
- Batting: Right-handed
- Bowling: Right-arm medium-fast
- Role: Bowler
- Relatives: C. K. Vijayan (brother)

Domestic team information
- Years: Team
- 1957/58–1965/66: Kerala
- 1966/67–1968/69: Madras

Career statistics
Competition	FC
Matches	42
Runs scored	580
Batting average	11.60
100s/50s	0/2
Top score	76*
Balls bowled	5,243
Wickets	106
Bowling average	29.05
5 wickets in innings	5
10 wickets in match	0
Best bowling	7/86
Catches/stumpings	28/–
- Source: ESPNcricinfo, 17 May 2016

Chandroth Kalyadan Bhaskaran (5 May 1941 – 21 November 2020) was an Indian former first-class cricketer who played for Kerala and Madras. He represented India in an unofficial Test match against Ceylon in 1965. He was regarded as "one of the country's leading fast bowlers in the sixties."

== Life and career ==
Born in Tellicherry (now Thalassery), Bhaskaran played as a right-arm medium-fast swing bowler. He made his first-class debut for Kerala in December 1957 at the age of 16. In January 1965, he played for India in an unofficial Test match against Ceylon at Ahmedabad. Bhaskaran switched to Madras during his later career, and was part of the Madras team that finished runners-up in the 1967–68 Ranji Trophy. In the final against Bombay, he scored 76 not out in the first innings and took 4/68 in Bombay's first innings. He appeared in a total of 42 first-class matches and took 106 wickets.

Bhaskaran worked as a doctor in Houston after his playing career, specializing in sports medicine, and treated several professional athletes from different nations. In 2006, he started the "Mission Gold for India" company to train Indian athletes for the Olympic Games.

Bhaskaran's brother C. K. Vijayan also played first-class cricket for Kerala.

He died on 21 November 2020 in Houston at the age of 79.
