= Usha Menon =

British gynaecologist

- Education: University of Madras, Christian Medical College, Vellore
- Occupations: Professor of Gynaecological Cancer, UCL Consultant Gynaecologist, University College Hospital

Usha Menon is a professor of gynaecological cancer at University College London.

She has been a lead investigator on UK ovarian cancer screening trials and on studies of ovarian cancer symptoms notably the UK Collaborative Trial of Ovarian Cancer Screening (UKCTOCS), which forms the evidence base for current ovarian cancer screening guidelines. UKCTOCS involved over 200,000 participants and 650,000 yearly screenings over a period of fourteen years with mortality as the endpoint.

== Life ==
Menon completed an MBBS in Medicine/Surgery in 1985 at the University of Madras and subsequently a diploma in Obstetrics and Gynaecology in 1988. In 1990 she achieved an MD. in Obstetrics and Gynaecology at Christian Medical College in Vellore, India.

Menon is currently an adjunct professor at the Department of Biotechnology, Translational Health Science and Technology Institute (THSTI) and Strategy Lead at the Clinical Development Services Agency, India where she works on initiatives to improve the academic clinical trials ecosystem. These initiatives have included an ethical review of multicentre research, a clinical trials toolkit and an integrated research application system.

She is an honorary consultant gynaecologist at the London UCLH NHS Foundation Trust where she focuses on women at risk for familial gynaecological cancer. She also runs the Familial Cancer Clinic for gynaecological oncology.

Menon's research interests include the management of women at increased risk of familial gynaecological cancers and runs the Familial Cancer Clinic for gynaecological oncology based at University College London Hospital.

She has been described as "one of Britain’s foremost specialists in gynaecological cancer".
