= Nazim Siddiqui =

Indian cricketer (born 1994)

Personal information
- Full name: Mohammad Nazim Siddiqui
- Born: 17 October 1994 (age 32); Dhanbad, Jharkhand, India
- Source: ESPNcricinfo, 6 October 2017

Nazim Siddiqui (born 17 October 1994) is an Indian cricketer. He made his first-class debut for Jharkhand in the 2017–18 Ranji Trophy on 6 October 2017. He made his List A debut for Jharkhand in the 2017–18 Vijay Hazare Trophy on 5 February 2018.
