= Prasanth Chandran =

Indian cricketer (born 1980)

Personal information
- Full name: Prasanth Chandran
- Born: 22 May 1980 (age 46); Ernakulam, Kerala
- Role: Right-hand batsman Right-arm fast medium Cricket coach
- Source: Cricinfo, 7 February 2021

Prasanth Chandran, is an Indian cricketer, who played 42 first-class matches between 2000 and 2008 for Kerala. Chandran completed training at MRF Pace Foundation and claimed 79 wickets for Kerala. Test players Vinod Kambli, Wasim Jaffer, Sairaj Bahutule and Ramesh Powar were his victims as he claimed seven for 71 against Mumbai, his career best, in the 2003 Ranji Trophy at the Wankhede Stadium. After retiring as a player, Chandran became a cricket coach at MRF Pace Foundation.
