= Jafar Jamal =

Indian cricketer (born 1990)

Personal information
- Born: 20 March 1990 (age 36); Kunnamkulam, Thrissur, Kerala, India
- Batting: Right-handed
- Bowling: Right-arm medium fast

Domestic team information
- Years: Team
- 2010/11 - 2015/16: Kerala

Jafar Jamal (born 20 March 1990) is an Indian cricketer who represents Kerala in domestic cricket. Jafar has played two List A matches and 20 Twenty20 matches for Kerala.
