= Venkateswarier Neelakantan =

Indian cricketer (born 1941)

Venkateswarier Neelakantan (born Thirunellai Venkateswarier Neelakantan on 7 June 1941) was an Indian cricketer. He was a right-handed batsman who played for Kerala. He was born in Palghat.

Neelakantan made a single first-class appearance for the side, during the 1965–66 season, against Andhra. From the tailend, he scored 13 not out in the only innings in which he batted.
