= Kochunny Thampuran =

Indian cricketer (born 1937)

Kochunny Thampuran (born 5 June 1937), full name Kerala Varma Kochunny Thampuran, is an Indian former cricketer who played first-class cricket for Travancore-Cochin. He was a right-handed batsman and right-arm off-break bowler, and was born in Thrippunithura, Kerala.

== Playing career ==
Thampuran made his only first-class appearance for Travancore-Cochin in the 1956–57 Ranji Trophy, against Andhra at the Public Works Department Ground in Guntur, from 12 to 15 January 1957.

Travancore-Cochin won the toss and elected to bat, but were dismissed for 180 in their first innings. Batting at number nine, Thampuran scored 11 runs before he was caught by V. L. Manjrekar off K. V. R. Murthy. Andhra replied with 171, giving Travancore-Cochin a nine-run first-innings lead.

In the second innings, Thampuran scored one run, being bowled by Andhra's M. S. Kumar. Travancore-Cochin made 185, leaving Andhra a target of 195. Andhra reached 197 for three and won the match by seven wickets.

Thampuran also bowled seven overs in Andhra's second innings, conceding 24 runs without taking a wicket. He took one catch, holding G. S. N. Raju off the bowling of S. Aaron in Andhra's first innings.

== Statistics ==
According to CricketArchive, Thampuran's first-class career comprised one match and two innings. He scored 12 runs at an average of 6.00, with a highest score of 11, and took one catch. With the ball, he delivered 42 balls, conceded 24 runs and took no wickets.

First-class statistics
| Batting | Value |
|---|---|
| Matches | 1 |
| Innings | 2 |
| Runs | 12 |
| Highest score | 11 |
| Batting average | 6.00 |
| Centuries | 0 |
| Half-centuries | 0 |
| Catches | 1 |

First-class bowling
| Bowling | Value |
|---|---|
| Balls | 42 |
| Runs conceded | 24 |
| Wickets | 0 |
| Best bowling | 0/24 |
| Economy rate | 3.42 |
