= Sambasiva Sarma =

Indian cricketer (born 1984)

Personal information
- Full name: Sambasiva Krishna Sarma
- Born: October 13, 1984 (age 42); Madras, Tamil Nadu
- Batting: Left-handed
- Bowling: Left-arm medium-fast

Domestic team information
- Years: Team
- 2006–2010: Kerala
- Source: Cricinfo, 19 June 2021

Sambasiva Krishna Sarma (born 13 October 1984) is an Indian cricketer who represented Kerala in domestic cricket. He is the first Kerala player to score a century in both the innings' of a Ranji Trophy match.

He made his List-A debut for Kerala on 10 February 2007, in the 2006-07 Vijay Hazare Trophy against Karnataka. He made his first-class debut for Kerala on 3 November 2007 in the 2007-08 Ranji Trophy against Vidarbha.
