= Mohan Akshaya =

Indian cricketer (born 1990)

Personal information
- Full name: Mohan Krishna Akshaya
- Born: October 14, 1990 (age 36); Kasargod, Kerala
- Batting: Right-handed
- Bowling: Right-arm offbreak
- Role: Batsman

Domestic team information
- Years: Team
- Kerala
- Manglore United
- Source: ESPNcricinfo, 21 November 2020

Mohan Krishna Akshaya (born October 14, 1990) is an Indian cricketer from Kasargod who plays domestic cricket for Kerala. He is a right handed batsman and right arm offspinner. He has also played for Manglore United in Karnataka Premier League.
