= Kelappan Thampuran (Kerala cricketer) =

Indian cricketer (born 1937)

Kelappan Thampuran (born 16 August 1937) was an Indian cricketer. He was a right-handed batsman and a right-arm off-break bowler. He was born in Thrippunithura.

Thampuran made his first-class debut during the 1956–57 season, for Travancore-Cochin against Andhra, though this would be the only match which he would play for the team. The following season, he joined Kerala, for whom he played the rest of his career.

Thampuran made his Kerala debut against Madras, though he averaged just 4 runs in the eight innings in which he batted during the season. Despite playing in only two games the following season, he returned to play all four of Kerala's matches in 1960–61.

Thampuran continued to play for the first team until 1966–67 – despite not making any first-class appearances the previous season. He made a top score of 65 runs against Andhra in 1963–64 – the highest score of the Kerala first innings.
