= Waseem Raza =

Indian cricketer (born 1993)

Personal information
- Full name: Waseem Raza Paray
- Born: 3 January 1993 (age 33); Srinagar, Jammu and Kashmir, India
- Batting: Right-handed
- Bowling: Slow left-arm orthodox
- Source: Cricinfo, 23 October 2015

Waseem Raza (born 3 January 1993) is an Indian cricketer who plays for Jammu and Kashmir. He was the leading wicket-taker for Jammu & Kashmir in the 2018–19 Vijay Hazare Trophy, with twelve dismissals in eight matches.
