= Kunal Datta (cricketer) =

Indian cricketer (born 1936)

Kunal Datta (born 20 August 1936) was an Indian cricketer. He was a right-handed batsman and a right-arm off-break bowler who played for Kerala. He was born in Patna.

Datta made a single first-class appearance for the side, during the 1959–60 season, against Andhra. From the lower-middle order, he scored 4 not out in the only innings in which he batted, as Kerala finished their first innings at 555/5, a team-best score which lasted for 48 years.

Datta bowled 8 overs in the match, taking figures of 1-25.
