= Shaktan Thampuran Private Bus Stand =

Bus station in Kerala, India

Shaktan Thampuran Private Bus Stand is a private bus terminal in Thrissur, Kerala, India and is located approximately 1 km south of the downtown area. As of 2015, over 1,200 buses conduct service in the terminal and over 3,500 services are conducted daily.
