= Renjith Menon =

Indian cricketer (born 1977)

Renjith Menon (born 2 May 1977, Ernakulam, Kerala) is an Indian first-class cricketer. He is a right handed lower order batsman and right arm fast medium bowler. He represents Kerala in the Ranji Trophy. He represented Kerala in a total of nine first class and eight list a matches.
