= Kelappan Thampuran (Travancore-Cochin cricketer) =

Indian cricketer (born 1937)

Kerala Varma Kelappan (born 19 July 1937) is a former Indian first-class cricketer. He was a right-handed batsman and right-arm off-break bowler who played for Travancore-Cochin. He was born in Thrippunithura in Cochin Royal Family.

Kelappan made a single first-class appearance for the team, during the 1951–52 season, against Mysore, at the young age of 14. He scored only one run in the two innings he batted. He took bowling figures of 1-17 from 12 overs of bowling.
