= P. M. Raghavan =

Indian cricketer

Personal information
- Full name: Ponnabeth Mambally Raghavan
- Born: 18 December 1920; Tellicherry, Madras Presidency, British India
- Died: unknown
- Batting: Right-handed
- Bowling: Right-arm medium
- Relatives: P. M. Anandan (brother); A. P. M. Gopalakrishnan (son); Varun Girilal (grandson); P. M. K. Mohandas (nephew); P. M. K. Raghunath (nephew)

Domestic team information
- Years: Team
- 1951–1956: Travancore-Cochin

Career statistics
Competition	FC
Matches	6
Runs scored	94
Batting average	10.44
100s/50s	0/0
Top score	27
Balls bowled	432
Wickets	3
Bowling average	71.00
5 wickets in innings	0
10 wickets in match	0
Best bowling	2/43
Catches/stumpings	3/–
- Source: CricketArchive, 21 July 2015

Ponnabeth Mambally Raghavan (18 December 1920, date of death unknown) was an Indian cricketer who played at first-class level for Travancore-Cochin (now Kerala) from 1951 to 1956. A right-handed batsman and right-arm medium-pace bowler, he captained the side in its inaugural Ranji Trophy match during the 1951–52 season.

Raghavan was born in Tellicherry (now Thalassery), in what was then part of the Madras Presidency but is now in Kerala State. In December 1951, aged 30, he was chosen to captain the new State of Travancore-Cochin in its Ranji Trophy debut against Mysore (now Karnataka). Although Raghavan topscored with 27 in the second innings, his team lost by an innings and 87 runs, and was consequently eliminated from the competition, which was played on a knockout basis at the time. He was re-appointed captain for the following season's Ranji fixture, where his team once again lost by an innings margin within two days. During the 1953–54 season, Travancore-Cochin was drawn to play Hyderabad in the opening round. Raghavan was selected to play, but was replaced as captain by his younger brother, P. M. Anandan. The match was drawn, but Travancore-Cochin was declared the winner based on its higher first innings total, and consequently proceeded to the next round of matches. Despite this, Raghavan was restored to the captaincy for the second-round fixture against Madras (now Tamil Nadu). He took career-best bowling figures of 2/43 in Madras's second innings, but Travancore-Cochin lost by 316 runs.

Anandan once again replaced Raghavan as captain for the 1954–55 season's first-round fixture, a loss to Madras on first innings. Raghavan's fourth and final match as captain of Travancore-Cochin came the following season, in what was to be his final first-class appearance. Aged 35, he recorded a duck in the first innings against Andhra and was absent hurt in the second, as his team succumbed to an innings defeat. Besides his young brother, Anandan, several other members of Raghavan's family represented what is now Kerala at first-class level, including his son, A. P. M. Gopalakrishnan, and two nephews, brothers P. M. K. Raghunath and P. M. K. Mohandas. Outside of playing cricket, the family have been prominent in the baking trade in Kerala.
