= Akshay Chandran =

Indian cricketer

Personal information
- Full name: Akshay Ramachandran Chandran
- Born: 19 October 1993 (age 33); Kochi, Kerala, India
- Batting: Left-handed
- Bowling: Slow left arm orthodox
- Role: All-rounder

Domestic team information
- Years: Team
- 2015 - present: Kerala (squad no. 19)

Career statistics
Competition	FC	LA	T20
Matches	39	17	4
Runs scored	1,688	139	32
Batting average	35.91	19.85	16.00
100s/50s	4/2	0/0	0/0
Top score	184	41	18
Balls bowled	2,746	772	54
Wickets	36	18	3
Bowling average	36.00	33.05	28.33
5 wickets in innings	1	0	0
10 wickets in match	0	0	0
Best bowling	6/39	4/29	1/5
Catches/stumpings	28/0	8/0	1/0
- Source: ESPNcricinfo, 11 November 2021

Akshay Ramachandran Chandran (born 19 October 1993) is an Indian cricketer who plays for Kerala in domestic cricket. He is an all-rounder who bats left-handed and bowls slow left arm orthodox.

== Domestic career ==
After representing Kerala in U-14, U-16, U-19, U-22 and U-25 levels, Akshay made his first-class debut for Kerala in the 2014-15 Ranji Trophy on 29 January 2015 against Services. He didn't create much impact in the first innings but came back with a fifer in the second. He scored his maiden century against Services in the 2016-17 Ranji Trophy scoring an unbeaten 102*.

During the 2017-18 Ranji Trophy he was reported for suspect action during Kerala's win against Rajasthan and wasn't able to take any further part in the campaign. However re-modeled his bowling action and returned to competitive cricket the next season through Vijay Hazare Trophy and claimed nine wickets from his first three matches.

He made his List A debut for Kerala in the 2018–19 Vijay Hazare Trophy on 19 September 2018 against Andhra Pradesh. He made his Twenty20 debut on 14 November 2019, for Kerala in the 2019–20 Syed Mushtaq Ali Trophy against Vidarbha.
