= Kerala Cricket Association =

Governing body of cricket in Kerala, India

- Sport: Cricket
- Jurisdiction: Kerala
- Abbreviation: KCA
- Founded: 1950
- Affiliation: Board of Control for Cricket in India
- Affiliation date: 1950
- Headquarters: KCA Complex, Sasthamkovil Road, Thycaud, Thiruvananthapuram
- President: Jayesh George
- Secretary: Vinod S. Kumar

Official website
- www.keralacricketassociation.com

The Kerala Cricket Association (KCA) is the governing body of the game of cricket in Kerala, India. It is affiliated to the Board of Control for Cricket in India and governs the Kerala cricket team, as well as the Kerala Cricket League.

KCA is also the parent body of 14 district associations – one in each of the revenue districts of Kerala. KCA participates in all age group tournaments conducted by the BCCI in both men's and women's categories. Through its program CASH-Kerala, KCA adopts and trains around 500 school children every year through its cricket academies. Operation Gold Hunt is another program of KCA where it adopts and trains selected young athletes, to help them achieve higher goals.

== History ==
G. V. Raja, Consort Prince of Travancore, formed the Travancore-Cochin Cricket Association in 1950. The primary objective of the association was to popularise the game in the State of Travancore-Cochin. The formative meeting of the Travancore-Cochin Cricket Association was held in the auditorium of the Maharaja's College, Eranakulam, due to the efforts of the P. M. Krishnan and P. M. Raghavan with support from Raja. Upon its inception, the Travancore-Cochin Cricket Association selected the Travancore-Cochin first class team, which was led by P. M. Raghavan. The team played its first match in the Ranji Trophy circuit against Mysore, where the P. M. Anandan took six-wickets, conceding 100 runs in 27 overs in the first innings of the match. Following the formation of the state of Kerala in 1956, the Travancore-Cochin Cricket Association was renamed as the Kerala Cricket Association (KCA).

There were certain intrinsic difficulties that hindered the progress of Kerala cricket. Since the monsoon rains, the cricketing season could only start in October. This was a major hindrance in developing decent outfields. Through the sixties, the state participated in the various inter-school and age group tournaments run by the BCCI. The mid-nineties had been a period of eminence for cricket in Kerala when its Ranji Trophy side qualified to the knockout stages for the first time in 1994/95. The present-day Kerala cricket teams are making deep inroads in BCCI tournaments.

Goda Varma Raja was the president of Kerala Cricket association from the years 1950 to 1963 and he was also the first person from Kerala to become an office bearer in BCCI when he became its vice-president. S. Karunakaran Nair popularly known as SK Nair, from Kerala Cricket Association served the BCCI as the treasurer during 1993–97, as finance committee chairman during 1998–2002, and as the honorary secretary of BCCI from 2003 to 2005. He had also served the Asian Cricket Council as its treasurer and secretary.

== Logo ==
KCA has adopted a logo similar to that of the BCCI. The basic element of the logo resembles the insignia of the Order of the Star of India. Instead of the star in the crest, a stylized image of Imperial Insignia of Sree Padmanabha's Shankha, which was the state emblem of the Kingdom of Travancore and the state emblem of Kerala, is used.
