= P. M. Anandan =

Indian cricketer (born 1924)

Personal information
- Full name: Ponnabeth Mambally Anandan
- Born: 1 December 1924; Tellicherry, Kerala, India
- Batting: Right-handed
- Bowling: Right-arm medium-pace
- Relatives: P. M. Raghavan (brother)

Domestic team information
- Years: Team
- 1951–52 to 1956–57: Travancore-Cochin
- 1957–58: Kerala

Career statistics
| Competition | First-class |
|---|---|
| Matches | 9 |
| Runs scored | 158 |
| Batting average | 9.87 |
| 100s/50s | 0/0 |
| Top score | 39 |
| Balls bowled | 1703 |
| Wickets | 30 |
| Bowling average | 23.20 |
| 5 wickets in innings | 3 |
| 10 wickets in match | 0 |
| Best bowling | 6/100 |
| Catches/stumpings | 5/– |
- Source: CricketArchive, 30 October 2016

Ponnabeth Mambally Anandan (born 1 December 1924) is an Indian former cricketer who played first-class cricket from 1951 to 1957.

Anandan was an opening bowler who made his first-class debut in 1951–52 in what was also Travancore-Cochin's first-class match. He took five or more wickets in an innings in each of his first three matches: 6 for 100 against Mysore in 1951–52, 5 for 65 against Mysore in 1952–53, and 5 for 38 against Hyderabad in 1953–54.

His older brother P. M. Raghavan also played first-class cricket for Travancore-Cochin.
