= Travancore-Cochin cricket team =

Indian state sports team

Team information
- Founded: 1951
- Last match: 1957
- Home ground: University Stadium, Thiruvananthapuram

History
- First-class debut: Mysore in 1951 at Central College Ground, Bangalore
- Ranji Trophy wins: 0

The Travancore-Cochin cricket team represented the Indian state of Travancore-Cochin in the Ranji Trophy from 1951–52 to 1956–57. After the state was reorganised and expanded to form the new state of Kerala in 1956, the Travancore-Cochin team was superseded by the Kerala cricket team, beginning with the 1957–58 Ranji Trophy.

== Playing record ==
Travancore-Cochin played seven Ranji Trophy matches in six seasons, losing five matches and drawing two.

=== 1951–52 ===
- Travancore-Cochin 150 and 85 lost to Mysore 322 by an innings and 87 runs. P. M. Anandan took 6 for 100 for Travancore-Cochin, which remained the team's best bowling figures. Ajjampur Krishnaswamy took 7 for 73 in the first innings for Mysore, which remained the best figures against Travancore-Cochin. All the Travancore-Cochin players except for M. Balan Pandit were making their first-class debuts.

=== 1952–53 ===
- Travancore-Cochin 86 and 86 lost to Mysore 220 by an innings and 48 runs. Anandan took 5 for 65.

This was Travancore-Cochin's first home game, and also the first first-class match at the University Stadium, Trivandrum, which was to become one of Kerala's main home grounds.

=== 1953–54 ===
- Travancore-Cochin 241 and 171 for 4 declared drew with Hyderabad 125 and 104 for 4. Anandan took 5 for 38, and in the first innings Pandit scored 106, which was Travancore-Cochin's first individual score of 50 or more, and remained the team's only century. There was no play on the second day owing to rain. With their first innings lead in a drawn match, Travancore-Cochin proceeded to the next round.
- Madras 275 and 336 for 5 declared defeated Travancore-Cochin 147 and 148 by 316 runs. Karsandas Bhatia took 5 for 56 in Madras's first innings before top-scoring in Travancore-Cochin's with 44.

=== 1954–55 ===
- Travancore-Cochin 247 and 141 for 6 drew with Madras 414 for 9 declared. A. G. Kripal Singh scored 208 for Madras, the highest score made against Travancore-Cochin. Pandit top-scored in each innings with 81 and 46.

This was the first first-class match at Maharaja College Ground, Ernakulam, where Kerala later played three times.

=== 1955–56 ===
- Andhra 462 for 9 declared defeated Travancore-Cochin 135 and 142 by an innings and 185 runs.

=== 1956–57 ===
- Travancore-Cochin 180 and 185 lost to Andhra 171 and 197 for 3 by seven wickets. Sandy Aaron, on his first-class debut, took 5 for 77 and 1 for 40 for Travancore-Cochin and, batting at number nine, top-scored in each innings with 29 not out and 40.

== Leading players ==
P. M. Anandan was the most successful bowler. He played in all seven matches and took 24 wickets at an average of 24.62. Balan Pandit was the most successful batsman, with 404 runs at an average of 28.85 in the seven matches. He also kept wickets, taking 15 catches and a stumping. In 1959–60 he also set the record score for Kerala of 262 not out, which stood for 48 seasons.

Anandan's elder brother P. M. Raghavan captained the team in four matches, Anandan in two matches and Pandit in one.

== Bibliography ==
- Mathur, L. N. (1966). The Encyclopaedia of Indian Cricket, 1965. Rajhans Prakashan. OCLC 1075795206.
- Bose, Mihir (1990). A History of Indian Cricket. Rupa & Company. ISBN 9780233985633.
