= Ernakulam district =

Ernakulam district എറണാകുളം ജില്ല
- District
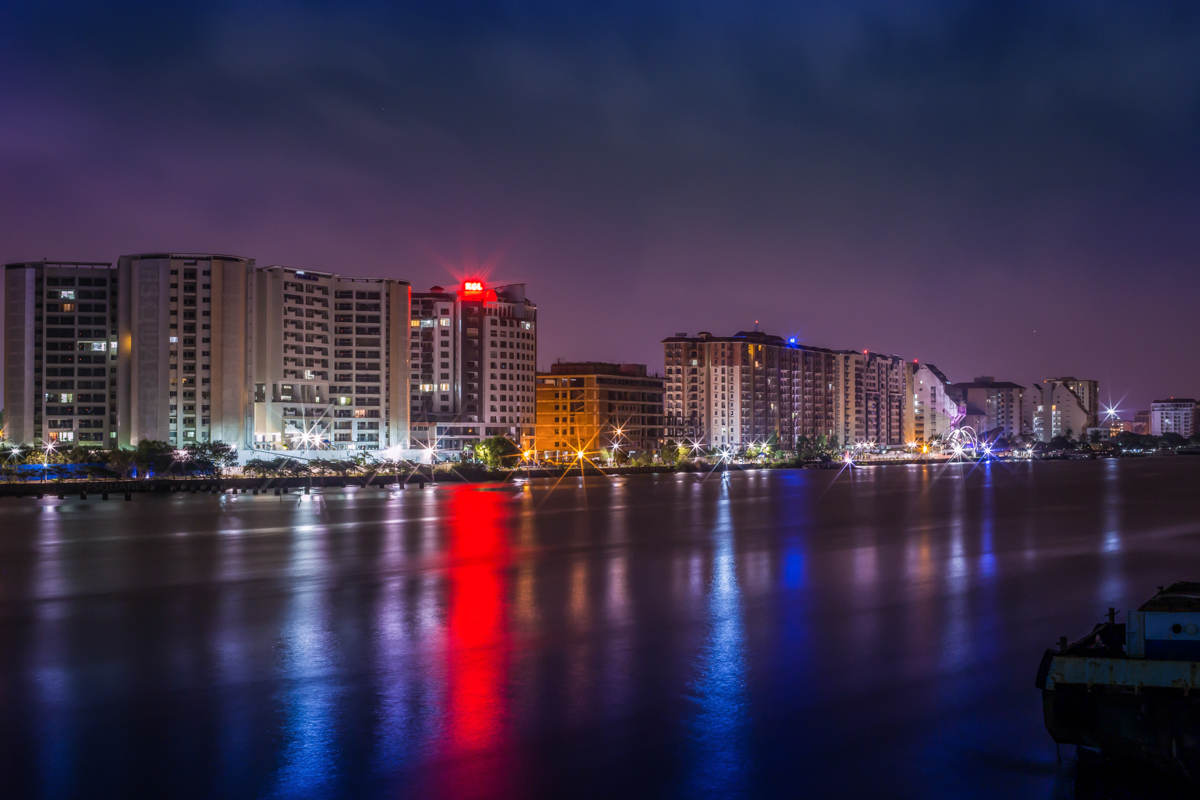
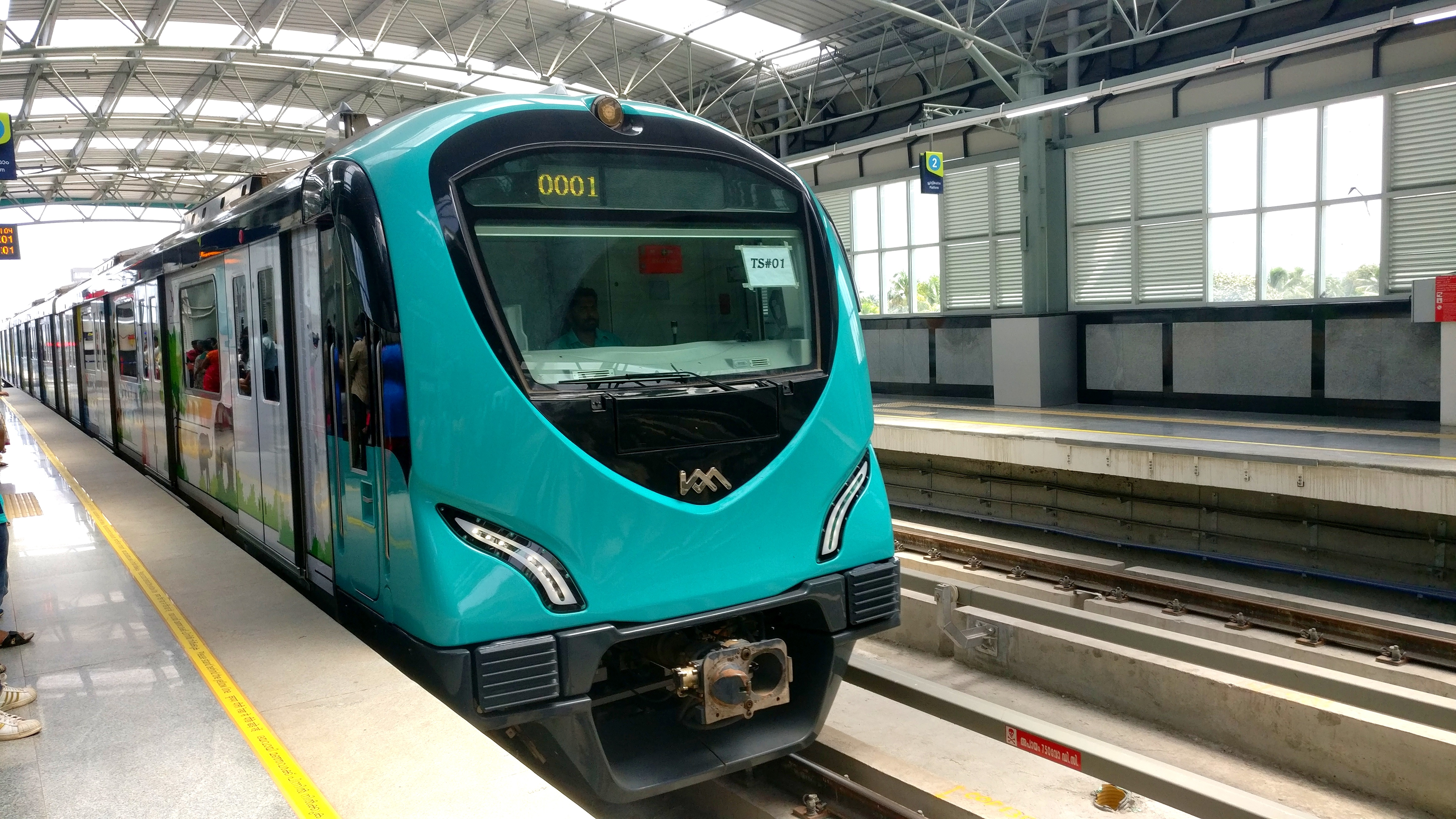
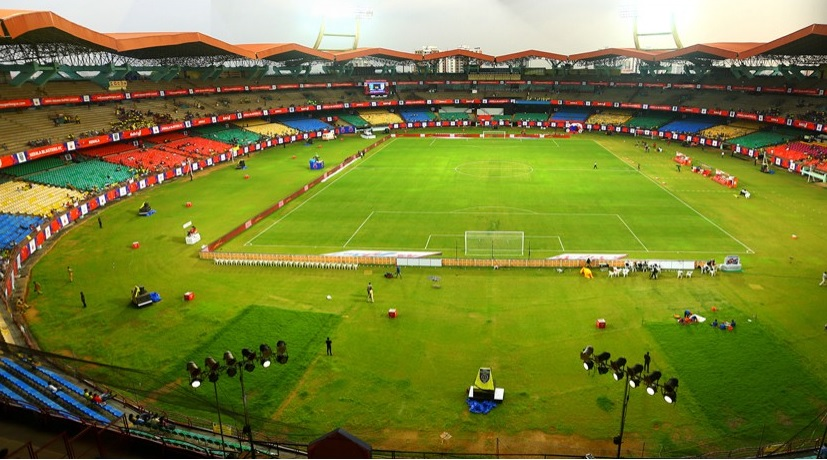
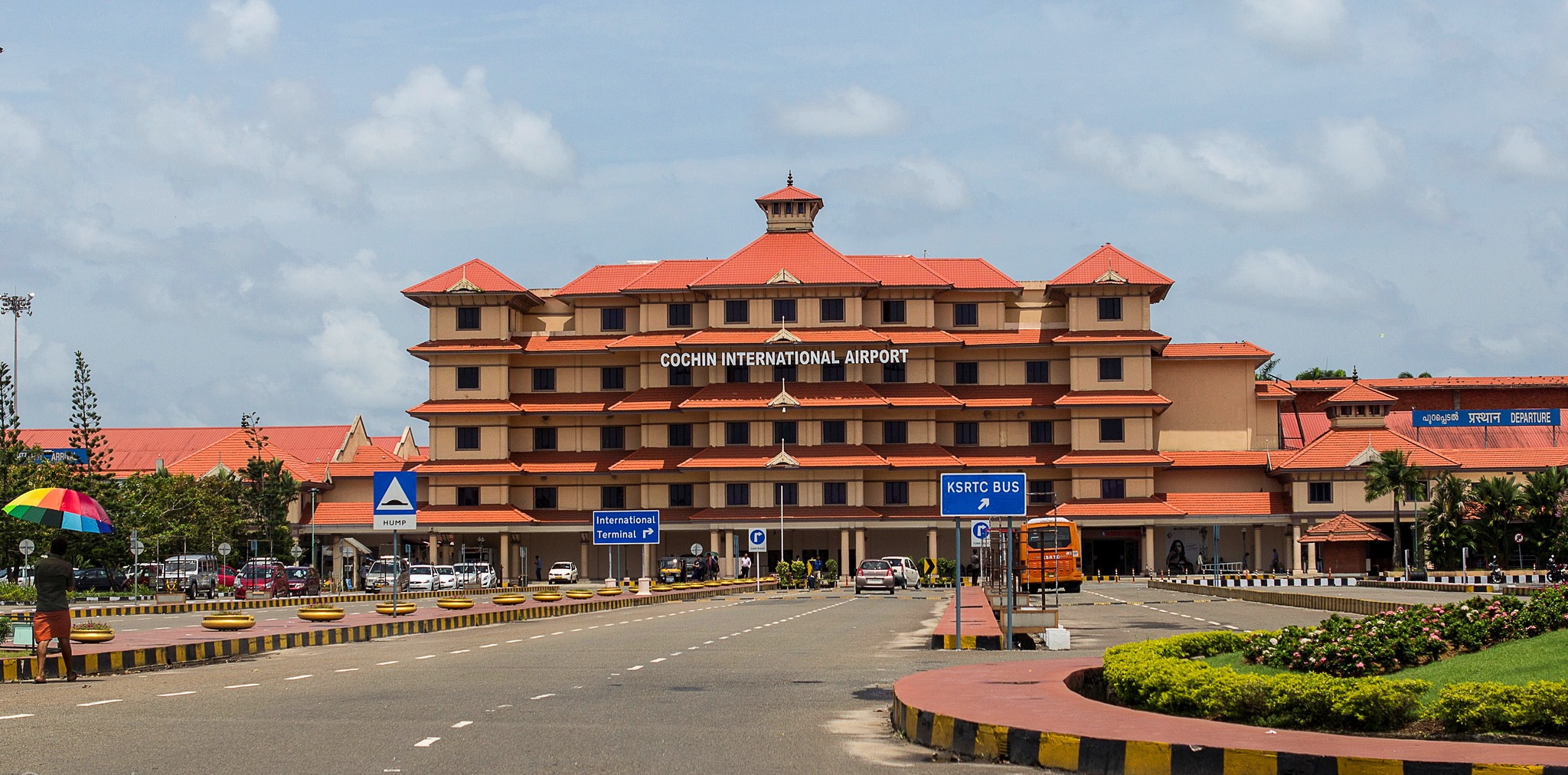
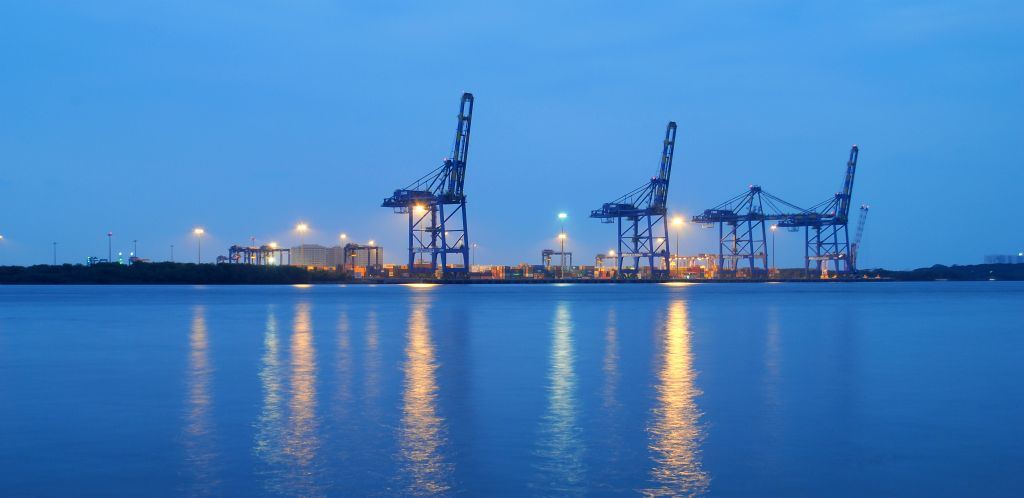
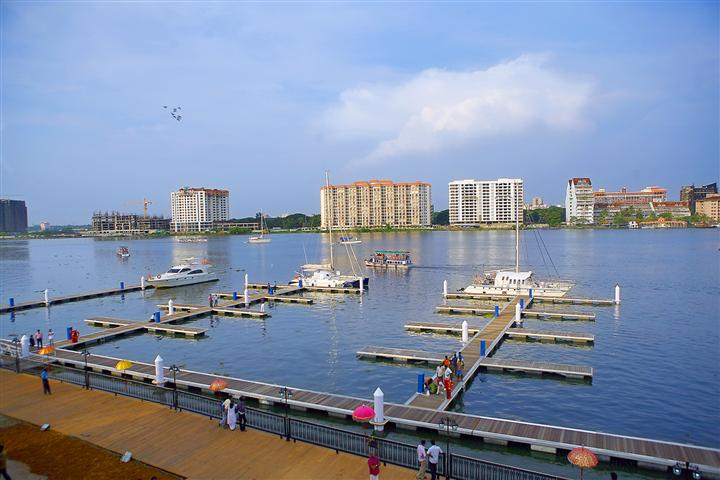
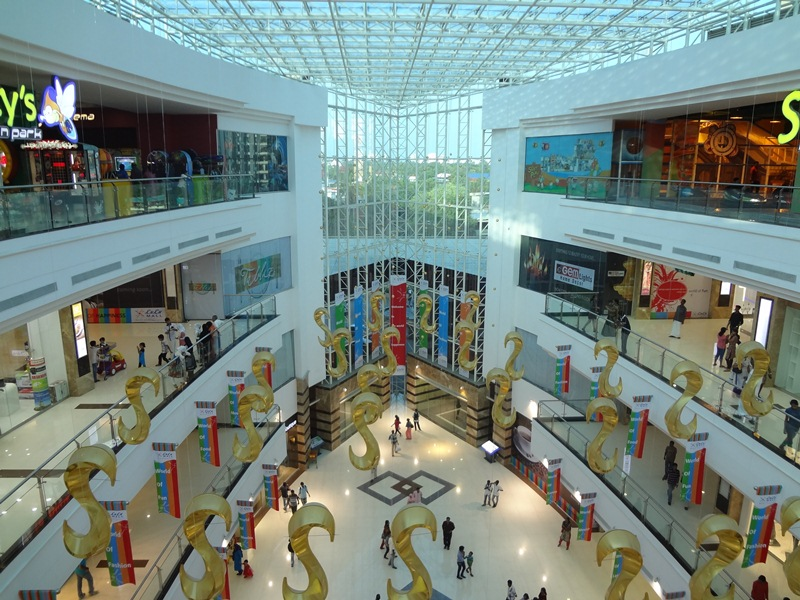
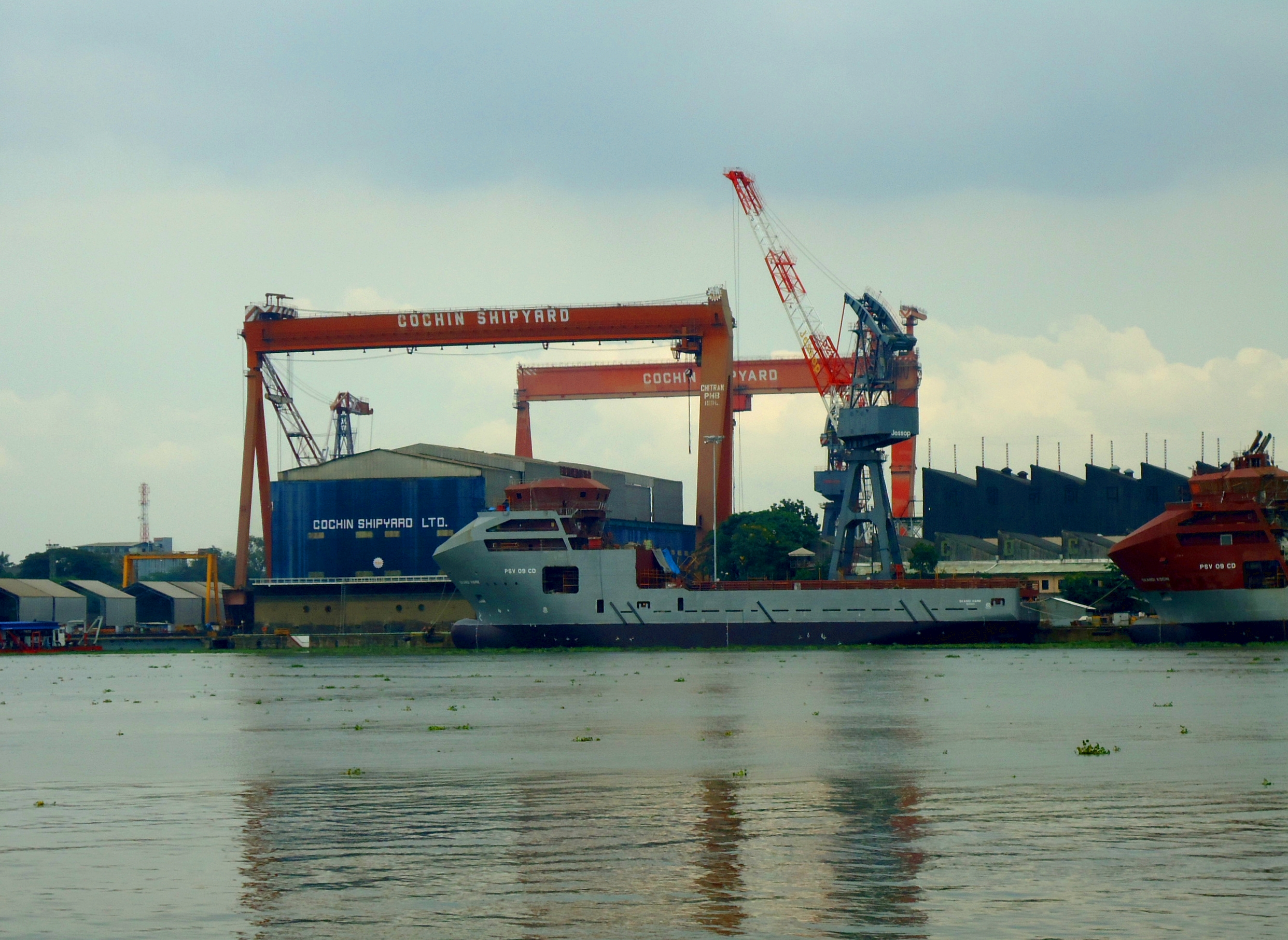
- Clockwise from top: Kochi skyline, Jawaharlal Nehru Stadium, International Container Transshipment Terminal, Lulu International Shopping Mall, Cochin Shipyard, Kochi Marina, Cochin International Airport, and Kochi Metro

- Old map from 1998 to 2023
- Interactive map of Ernakulam district
- Coordinates: 10.00°N 76.33°E
- Country: India
- State: Kerala
- Established: 1 April 1958
- Headquarters: Kakkanad, Kochi
- Subdivisions: Revenue Divisions: 2: Fort Kochi; Muvattupuzha; Taluks: 7: Kanayannur; Kochi; Aluva; Kunnathunad; Muvattupuzha; Kothamangalam; Paravur

Government
  - Collector: G. Priyanka, IAS
  - Commissioner & DIG (Kochi): Putta Vimaladitya, IPS
  - S.P (Ernakulam Rural): K.Karthik, IPS
  - DFO: A. Renjan, IFS

Area
  - Total: 2,408 km^{2} (930 sq mi)
  - Rank: 8th

Population (2018)
  - Total: 3,427,659
  - Density: 1,119/km^{2} (2,900/sq mi)

Languages
  - Official: Malayalam
- Time zone: UTC+5:30 (IST)
- ISO 3166 code: IN-KL-KO, IN-KL
- Vehicle registration: KL-07 Ernakulam; KL-17 Muvattupuzha; KL-39 Thripunithura; KL-40 Perumbavoor; KL-41 Aluva; KL-42 North Paravur; KL-43 Mattancherry; KL-44 Kothamangalam; KL-63 Angamaly
- HDI (2025): ▲0.827 very high
- Website: ernakulam.nic.in

Ernakulam district (IPA: [erɐɳɐːguɭɐm]; ISO: Eṟaṇākuḷaṁ) is one of the 14 districts in the Indian state of Kerala, and takes its name from the eponymous city division in Kochi. It is situated in the central part of the state, spans an area of about 2,408 km^{2} (930 sq mi), and is home to over 9% of Kerala's population. Ernakulam is the third most populous district in Kerala with its headquarters located at Kakkanad. The district's principal urban centre is Kochi, which is known as the commercial and financial capital of Kerala.

Ernakulam district was formed on 1 April 1958 as part of the reorganisation of districts in Kerala, with its territory initially comprising parts of the erstwhile Thrissur and Kottayam districts. It includes the most populous metropolitan region of the state, the Kochi metropolitan area. Ernakulam district yields the highest revenue and the largest number of industries in the state. It is the most urbanised district in Kerala, with approximately 68.1% of its population living in urban areas as per the 2011 census. The district also hosts the highest number of international and domestic tourists in the state.

Ernakulam was the first fully literate district in India, achieving a 100% literacy rate in 1990. The most commonly spoken language is Malayalam. English is widely used, mostly in business circles. Ernakulam became India's first district to have 100 percent banking or full "meaningful financial inclusion" in 2012. It has a high Human Development Index of 0.801 (UNDP report 2005), which is one of the highest in India and the highest in Kerala.

== Etymology ==
The word Ernakulam has a varied derivation, with some references to mythology and others to temples. According to Komattil Achutha Menon, the word Erangiyal got its start from a particular kind of mud. In the past, Lord Shiva was referred to as Erayanar in Chennai. This was done in Kerala as well, and it became known as Eranakulam after that. There are also other opinions about the origin of the name, saying that Rishinagakulam became Eranakulam after losing it, but that the word Ernakulam came from Eranakulathappan Temple, and that it came from the word Kulam (Pond) for a long time because it was full of water bodies.

== History ==
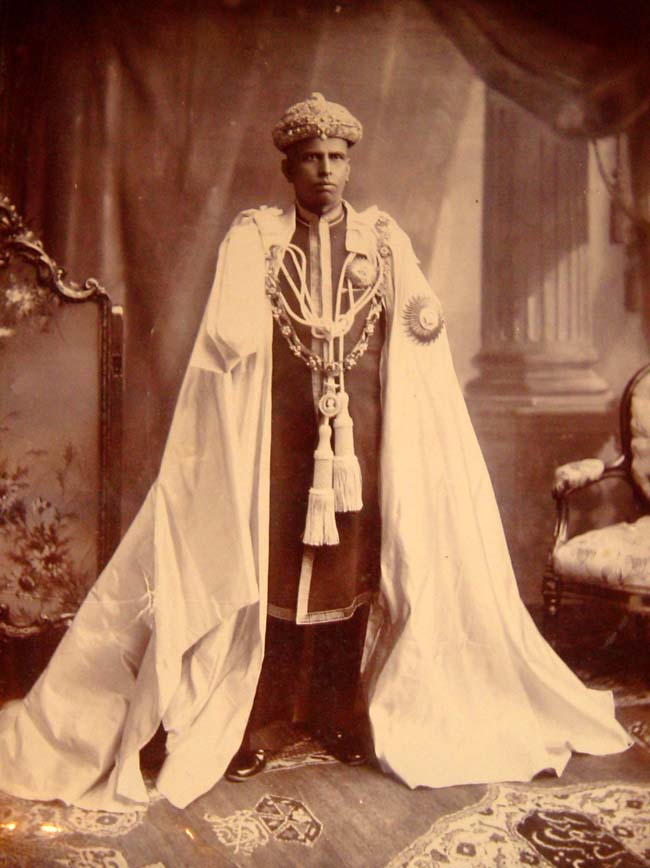
Rama Varma XV at the Delhi Durbar of 1903.

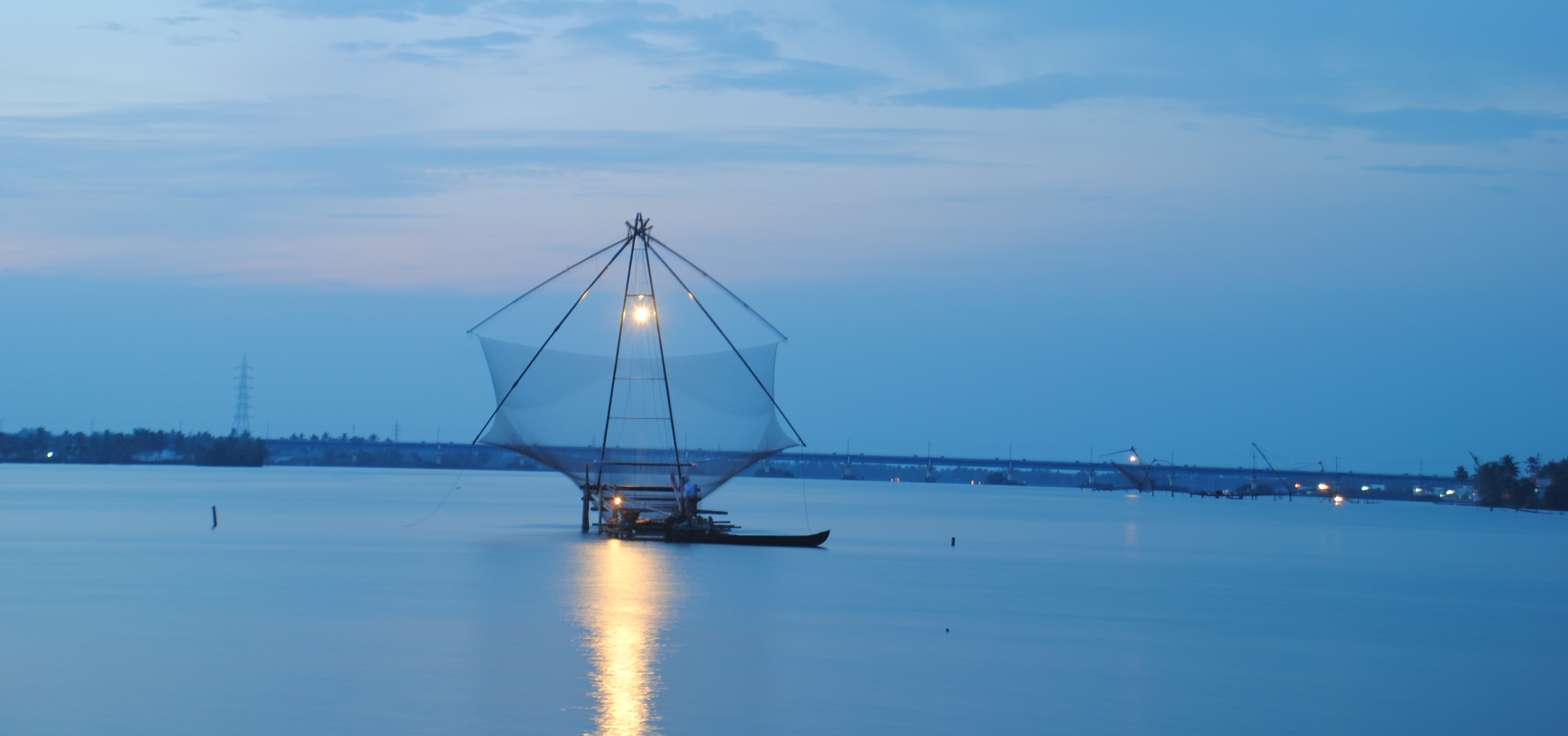
Chinese fishing nets, Fort Kochi

Ernakulam has played a part in the political history of south India since ancient times. The Jews, Syrians, Arabs, Chinese, Dutch, British, and Portuguese seafarers followed the sea route to the Kingdom of Cochin and left their impressions on the town. The port at Kozhikode held superior economic and political position in medieval Kerala coast, while Kannur, Kollam, and Kochi, were commercially important secondary ports, where the traders from various parts of the world would gather. In 1664, the municipality of Fort Kochi was established by Dutch Malabar, making it the first municipality in Indian subcontinent, which got dissolved when the Dutch authority got weaker in 18th century.

In 1896, the Maharaja of Cochin initiated local administration by forming a town council in Ernakulam. Following the formation of the state of Kerala in 1956, Ernakulam district was subsequently formed on 1 April 1958. Initially, the district headquarters were located in Ernakulam which was later relocated to Kakkanad. In the year 1998, Kuttampuzha village was added to the district from Idukki district following which the district got a political boundary with neighbouring state of Tamil Nadu. There is no interstate road that connects the district with the neighbouring state through this border.

== Geography ==
The Ernakulam district covers an area of 2,408 km^{2} (930 sq mi) on the Western Coastal Plains of India. It is surrounded by the Thrissur District to the north, the Idukki District and Coimbatore District to the east, Alappuzha and Kottayam to the south and the Laccadive Sea to the west. The district is divided geographically into highland, midland, and coastal area. The altitude of the highlands is about 300 m (980 ft). The Periyar River, Kerala's longest, flows through all the taluks except Muvattupuzha. The Muvattupuzha River and a branch of the Chalakkudy River also flow through the district. The average yearly rainfall in the district is 3,432 mm (135.1 in). The district has a moderate climate and mostly falls within the Malabar Coast moist forests ecoregion, while the highlands are part of the South Western Ghats moist deciduous forests ecoregion. Some parts of the Idamalayar Reserve Forest and Mankulam Forest Division have Sholas but these parts are inaccessible by road. The Idamalayar Reserve Forest, and Edamalakkudy. Many types of sand, soil, and rocks are abundant here. Cochin International Airport is located in the northern part of the district at Nedumbassery, Kochi.

The district houses two Urban Agglomerations, Kochi and Kothamangalam. Kochi is the largest city in the state, and 17th most populous in the country according to the Ministry of Housing and Urban Affairs rankings based on the 2011 Census, with an area of over 843 km2 and 2.12 million population.

=== Topography ===
The district is divided into three parts: lowland, midland, and the highland that consist of seaboard, plains, and hills and forests respectively. 20 percent of the total area are lowlands. The forests in the eastern part of the district are mostly remote, forming a part of the Anamalais. The midland consists mainly of plain land and a group of islands that naturally drain water via backwaters and canals. The hilly or eastern portion is formed by a section of the Western Ghats. Muvattupuzha and Kothamangalam taluks, which were initially parts of the Kottayam district and constitute the highlands. Muvattupuzha and Periyar are the main rivers, of which the latter flows through Muvattupuzha, Aluva, Kunnathunad and Parur taluks. During the rainy season these rivers are full and heavy floods affect the low-lying areas on the banks, but in the summer season, they generally go dry and narrow. The Periyar is stretched over a length of 244 km (152 mi).

=== Forest and wildlife ===
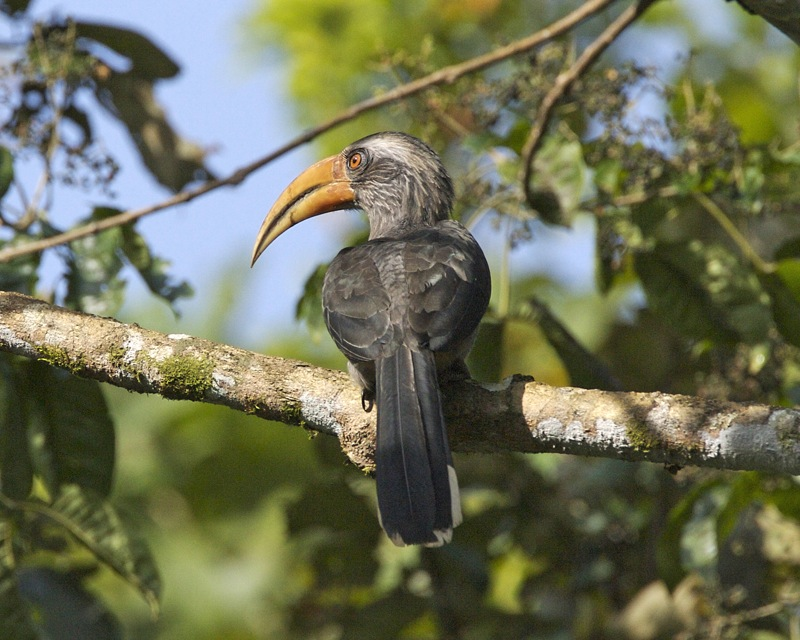
The Grey hornbill

The flora of this district is tropical. The heavy rainfall combined with moderate temperatures and fertile soil support abundant vegetation. Many of the common plants are found in the coastal area, which forms the lowland region. The midland region is occupied by coconut palms, paddy, tapioca, pepper, pineapple and pulses. The lower slopes of the highland region have teak and rubber.

==== Mangalavanam Bird Sanctuary ====
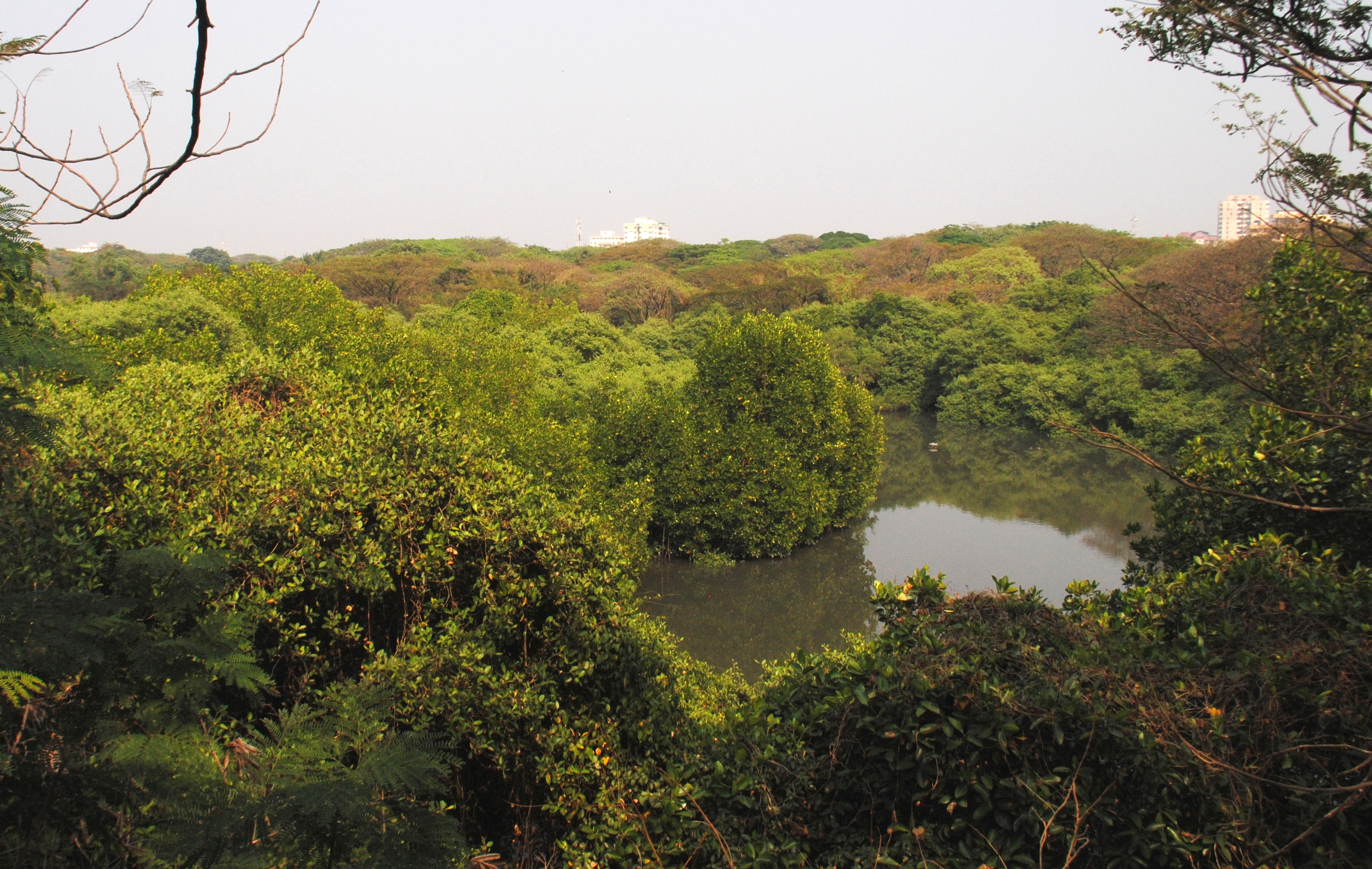
Mangalavanam

Mangalavanam Bird Sanctuary is located at the centre of Kochi. It covers 2.74 ha (6.8 acres), supports many species of mangroves and is a nesting ground for a variety of migratory birds. The Managalavanam is called the "green lung of Kochi", considering its role in controlling the city's air pollution.

==== Thattekad Bird Sanctuary ====
Thattekad Bird Sanctuary lies on the northern bank of the Periyar River and covers about 25 km^{2} (10 sq mi). It was founded by ornithologist Salim Ali. The sanctuary is 80 km (50 miles) from Kochi. Birds found here include falcons, jungle fowl, water hens, and hornbills. The flora of this area consists mainly of plantations of teak, rosewood, and mahogany. Further on the road, Pooyamkutty forest of the Anamalais is reached.

=== Climate ===
Climate data for Kochi
Month	Jan	Feb	Mar	Apr	May	Jun	Jul	Aug	Sep	Oct	Nov	Dec	Year
Record high °C (°F)	35 (95)	37 (99)	37 (99)	34 (93)	35 (95)	33 (91)	35 (95)	35 (95)	38 (100)	35 (95)	34 (93)	33 (91)	38 (100)
Mean daily maximum °C (°F)	30 (86)	31 (88)	31 (88)	31 (88)	31 (88)	28 (82)	28 (82)	28 (82)	28 (82)	29 (84)	30 (86)	30 (86)	30 (86)
Mean daily minimum °C (°F)	23 (73)	25 (77)	26 (79)	26 (79)	26 (79)	25 (77)	24 (75)	24 (75)	25 (77)	25 (77)	25 (77)	23 (73)	25 (77)
Record low °C (°F)	17 (63)	18 (64)	20 (68)	21 (70)	22 (72)	21 (70)	21 (70)	20 (68)	22 (72)	20 (68)	20 (68)	19 (66)	17 (63)
Average precipitation mm (inches)	21.9 (0.86)	22.9 (0.90)	35.3 (1.39)	124.0 (4.88)	395.7 (15.58)	720.7 (28.37)	697.2 (27.45)	367.8 (14.48)	289.4 (11.39)	302.3 (11.90)	175.1 (6.89)	48.3 (1.90)	3,228.3 (127.10)
Source 1:
Source 2:

== Economy ==
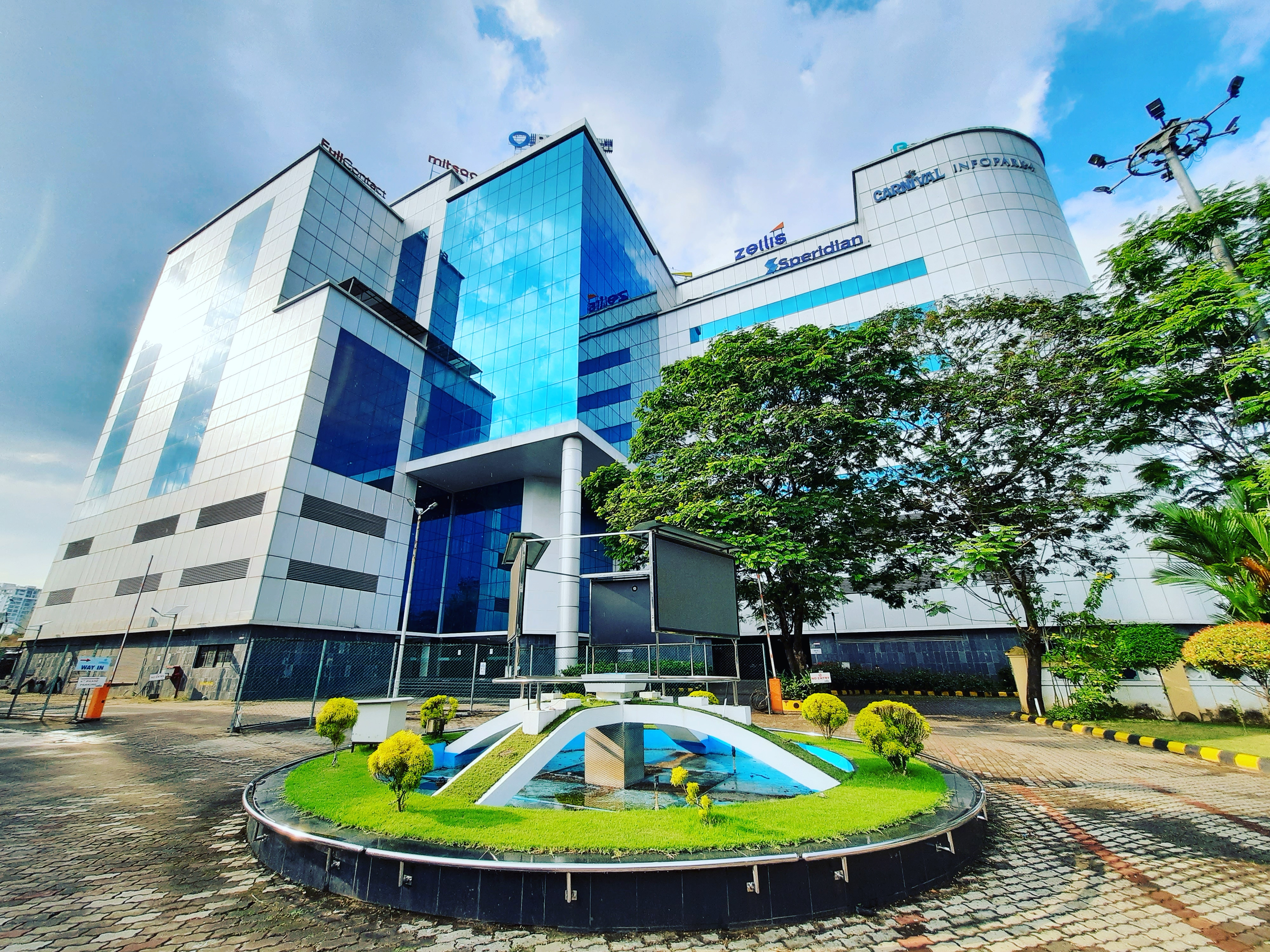
Infopark, Kochi

Ernakulam district is the richest district in Kerala and is the biggest commercial centre in the state of Kerala. It contributes the most to the state exchequer in terms of GSVA and tax revenues. The total literacy rate of Ernakulam district was 95.89% in 2011. It has the highest per capita income in the state, along with having the greatest number of commercialised banks, startups and large-scale industries & MSMEs in the state. Its M.G. Road is home to some of Kerala's most prestigious enterprises. Kochi is also the headquarters of some large companies like Federal Bank, Geojit, V-Guard, and Muthoot.

The sea along the entire coast of the district and its backwaters are the habitat of various kinds of fish that supply both marine and inland fisheries.

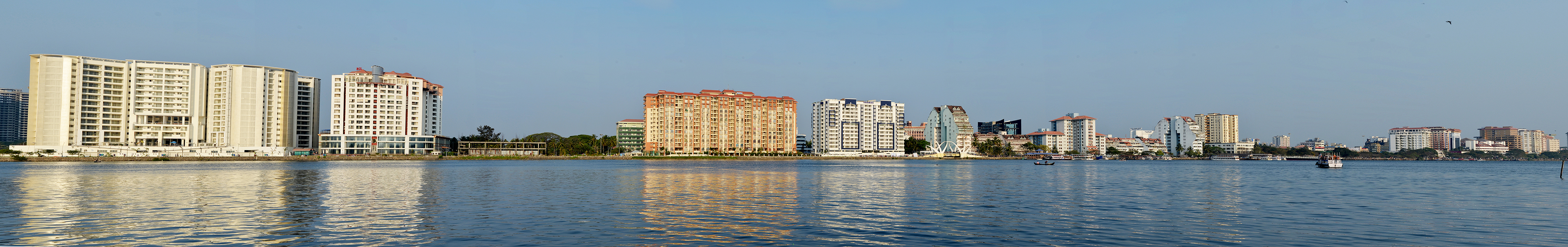
Kochi Marine Drive Day View

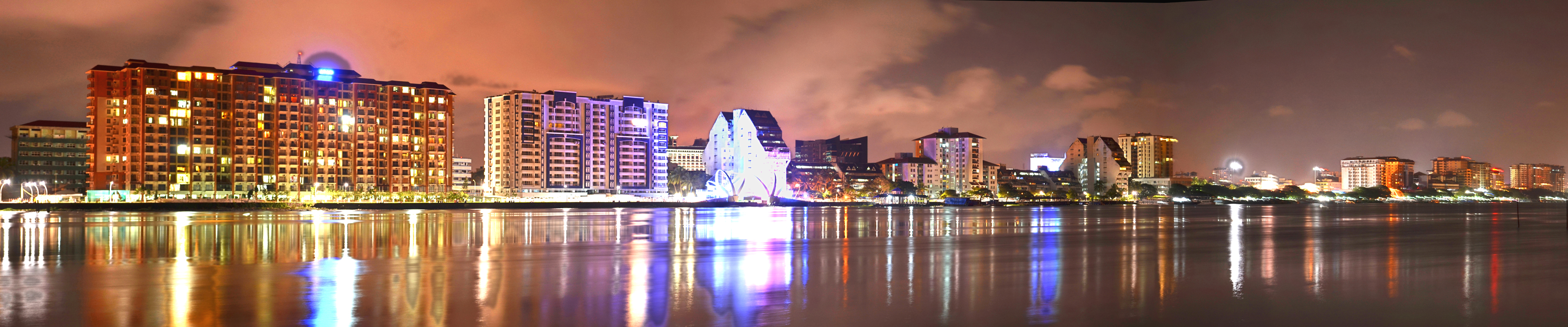
The beauty in the night, Marine Drive, Kochi

=== Agriculture ===
The eastern part of Ernakulam is primarily agrarian in nature. Rice is the principal crop cultivated in the wetlands. The district is the largest producer of nutmeg and pineapple in the state: more than 55% of pineapples produced in the state is cultivated in the district. Rubber is the most cultivated plantation crop in the district and the district is the second-largest producer of rubber in the state behind Kottayam. Other important crops cultivated in the district are tapioca, black pepper, areca nut, coconut, turmeric, banana, and plantain.

== Education ==
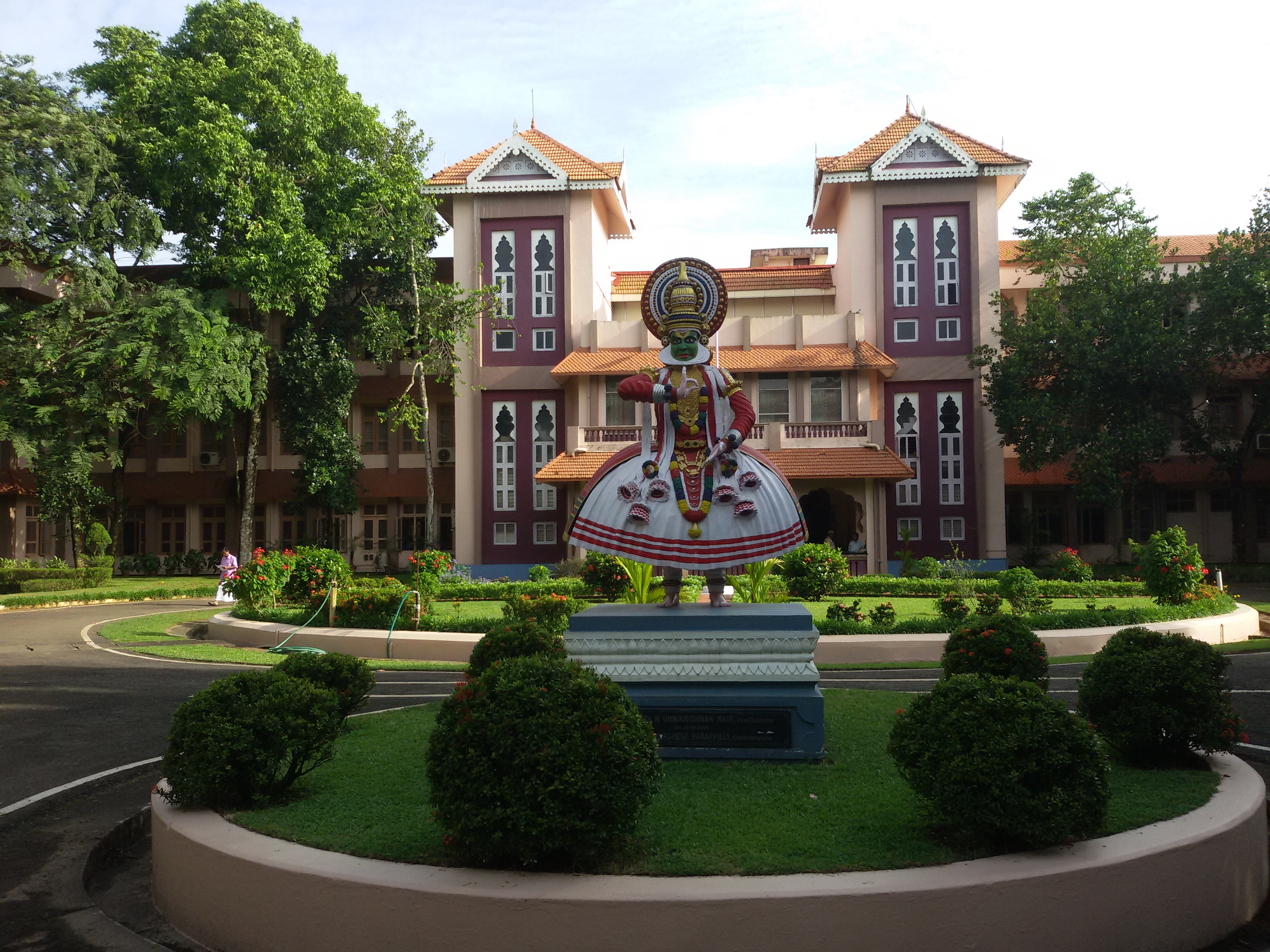
Administrative Block of Cochin University of Science and Technology

Ernakulam is the first district in India to have 100 percent literacy by 1990. The Kochi city has the highest literacy rate for any city in the country with over 20 lakhs population. Pothanikkad of Ernakulam is the first village in India that achieved 100 percent literacy according to state literacy programme.

There are three prominent universities in Ernakulam: Sree Sankaracharya University of Sanskrit in Kalady, Cochin University of Science and Technology in Kalamassery, and Kerala University of Fisheries and Ocean Studies in Kochi. The district has the most educational institutions in the state; as of 2019, there are 476 fully high-tech schools in Ernakulam.

In 2017, Ernakulam district administration launched the Roshni project, which aims to provide Malayalam education to migrant children. It supported 1,265 migrant workers' children from lower primary to high school.

== Administration ==
The district administration is headed by the District Collector and handles land revenue, disaster management, elections, and law and order. The district is divided into revenue divisions under a Revenue Divisional Officer/Sub Collector, further into taluks under Tahsildars, and then into revenue villages. The district has two revenue divisions—Fort Kochi and Muvattupuzha—along with 7 taluks and 124 revenue villages.

=== Taluks ===
The district has the most taluks in Kerala, with a total of seven, grouped under two revenue divisions — Fort Kochi and Muvattupuzha. Each revenue division is headed by a Revenue Divisional Officer (RDO), while each taluk is administered by a tehsildar.

- Paravur
- Aluva
- Kunnathunad
- Muvattupuzha
- Kochi
- Kanayannur
- Kothamangalam

These taluks are further divided into 124 revenue villages for land revenue and related administrative matters.

== Local governments ==
=== Corporation of Kochi ===
The Kochi Municipal Corporation is the governing body responsible for administering the city of Kochi and its suburbs. It is headed by a Mayor and a Deputy Mayor.

=== Municipalities ===
Interestingly, Ernakulam district has the most municipalities in the state.

- North Paravur
- Piravom
- Muvattupuzha
- Koothattukulam
- Perumbavoor
- Aluva
- Angamaly
- Thripunithura
- Kalamassery
- Kothamangalam
- Eloor
- Maradu
- Thrikkakara

A criticism that has been centered around this fact is that despite municipalities like Aluva, Kalamassery, Thrikkakara, Maradu, Tripunithura and Eloor becoming assimilated into Kochi city, they still exist as individual municipalities instead of being under Kochi Corporation. The corporation has not amended its limits for over half a century, since 1967. The corporation was the largest in area and population when it was formed, and all these regions were panchayats back then. .

=== Rural divisions ===
Ernakulam district’s rural local self-government is organised into a three-tier system comprising one district panchayat, 14 block panchayats, and 82 gram panchayats. This structure functions under the Kerala Panchayati Raj Act, 1994 to plan and implement development programmes, deliver basic services, and promote participatory governance in rural areas.

== Parliamentary constituencies ==
- Ernakulam Parliamentary Constituency
- Chalakudy Parliamentary Constituency (partially)
- Idukki Parliamentary Constituency (parts of Muvattupuzha taluk and Kothamangalam taluk)
- Kottayam Parliamentary Constituency (parts of Muvattupuzha taluk and Kanayannur taluk)

=== Assembly constituencies ===
District	No.	Constituency	Name	Party	Alliance	Remarks
Ernakulam	74	Perumbavoor	Manoj Moothedan	INC	UDF	
Ernakulam	75	Angamaly	Roji M. John	INC	UDF	Minister for Higher Education
Ernakulam	76	Aluva	Anwar Sadath	INC	UDF	
Ernakulam	77	Kalamassery	V. E. Abdul Gafoor	IUML	UDF	Minister for Fisheries, Social Justice & Harbour Engineering
Ernakulam	78	Paravur	V. D. Satheesan	INC	UDF	Chief Minister of Kerala
Ernakulam	79	Vypin	Tony Chammany	INC	UDF	
Ernakulam	80	Kochi	Mohammad Shiyas	INC	UDF	
Ernakulam	81	Thrippunithura	Deepak Joy	INC	UDF	
Ernakulam	82	Ernakulam	T. J. Vinod	INC	UDF	
Ernakulam	83	Thrikkakara	Uma Thomas	INC	UDF	
Ernakulam	84	Kunnathunad (SC)	V. P. Sajeendran	INC	UDF	
Ernakulam	85	Piravom	Anoop Jacob	KC(J)	UDF	Minister of Food, Civil Supplies & Consumer Affairs
Ernakulam	86	Muvattupuzha	Mathew Kuzhalnadan	INC	UDF	
Ernakulam	87	Kothamangalam	Shibu Thekkumpuram	KEC	UDF	

== Demographics ==
Historical population
Year	Pop.	±% p.a.
1901	646,235	—
1911	735,267	+1.30%
1921	789,311	+0.71%
1931	982,731	+2.22%
1941	1,172,292	+1.78%
1951	1,393,679	+1.74%
1961	1,702,740	+2.02%
1971	2,170,820	+2.46%
1981	2,549,255	+1.62%
1991	2,840,279	+1.09%
2001	3,105,798	+0.90%
2011	3,282,388	+0.55%
2018	3,427,659	+0.62%

According to the 2018 Statistics Report, Ernakulam has a population of 3,427,659. The 2011 census of India reports that the district is ranked 104th most populous in India out of 640. The district has a population density of 1,072 inhabitants per square kilometre (2,780/sq mi). Its population growth rate in 2001–2011 was 5.69%. Ernakulam has a sex ratio of 1027 females for every 1000 males, and a literacy rate of 95.89%. 68.07% of the population lives in urban areas. Scheduled Castes and Scheduled Tribes make up 8.18% and 0.50% of the population respectively.

Languages of Ernakulam district (2011)
1. Malayalam (96.7%)
2. Konkani (0.97%)
3. Tamil (0.94%)
4. Others (1.39%)

According to the 2011 census, 96.70% of the population spoke Malayalam, 0.97% Konkani and 0.94% Tamil as their first language.

This district is listed as the "most advanced" district in Kerala. It had a resident population of 3,105,798 as of 2001, excluding the commuters from neighbouring districts.

According to the 2011 Census of India, Ernakulam District also houses the largest city (UA) in the state (17th largest in the country) – Kochi Urban Agglomeration. Kochi UA spans across 843km2 with a population of 2,119,724 (2.12 million), thereby housing approximately two thirds of the population of Ernakulam District. Government of Kerala have also marked Kochi UA as the only "first order UA" in the state, which has its influence spread across the entire state unlike the other smaller cities.

The district also houses another smaller urban agglomeration – Kothamangalam, which has an area of 81.42 km^{2} housing over 1,14,639 people. The towns of Kothamangalam and Muvattupuzha form a major chunk of the Kothamangalam UA.

=== Religion ===
Religions in Ernakulam district (2011)
Religion	Percent
Hinduism	45.99%
Christianity	38.03%
Islam	15.67%
Other or not stated	0.31%

Religions in Ernakulam
Talukas	Hindus	Christians	Muslims	Others
Kunnathunad	45.32	35.39	19.16	0.13
Aluva	37.78	44.64	17.29	0.29
Paravur	56.69	28.93	14.13	0.25
Kochi	41.74	41.15	16.67	0.44
Kanayannur	53.16	34.49	11.91	0.44
Muvattupuzha	40.53	45.14	14.12	0.21
Kothamangalam	36.16	41.82	21.77	0.25

Hindus (46%) accounts for the largest community, followed by Christians (38%) (Latin Catholic, Syro-Malabar, Jacobites, Pentecostals and Malankara Orthodox) and Muslims (15.7%). Syro-Malabar Church Constitute The Largest Population Followed By Latin Catholics, Concentrated on the coastal belt which is followed by Jacobite. A small population of Jains, Jews, and Sikhs reside in Kochi. Ernakulam once had a vibrant Jewish population, with several synagogues, known as the Malabar Jews who used to dominate the trade and commercial activities in the district. After the state of Israel was formed in 1945, the entire community made aliyah to Israel in the 1950s. Today they number 8000 in Israel but very few Jews remain in the district. After a direct flight service was established between Kochi and Tel Aviv they have retained ties with the state with annual visits and gatherings.

Ernakulam also has a significant Konkani Hindu population who migrated from Goa during the Goa Inquisition. There is a small Jain community in Ernakulam district, concentrated mainly in Kochi city. The Sikh community in Ernakulam is also concentrated mainly in Kochi. There are more than 25 Sikh families in Kochi and there is one gurdwara.

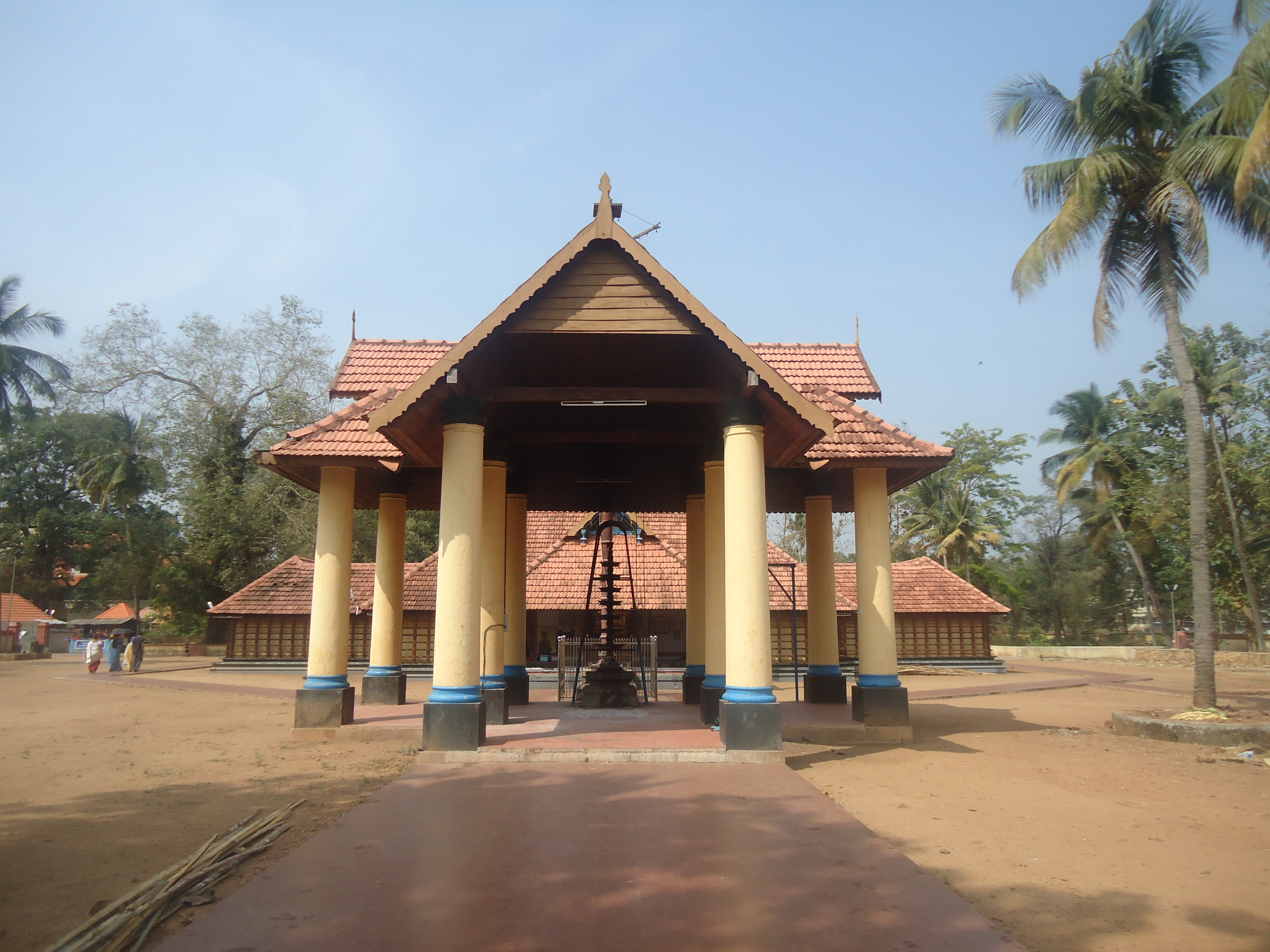
Thrikkakara Temple-one of the few temples in India and only temple in Kerala dedicated to Lord Vamana

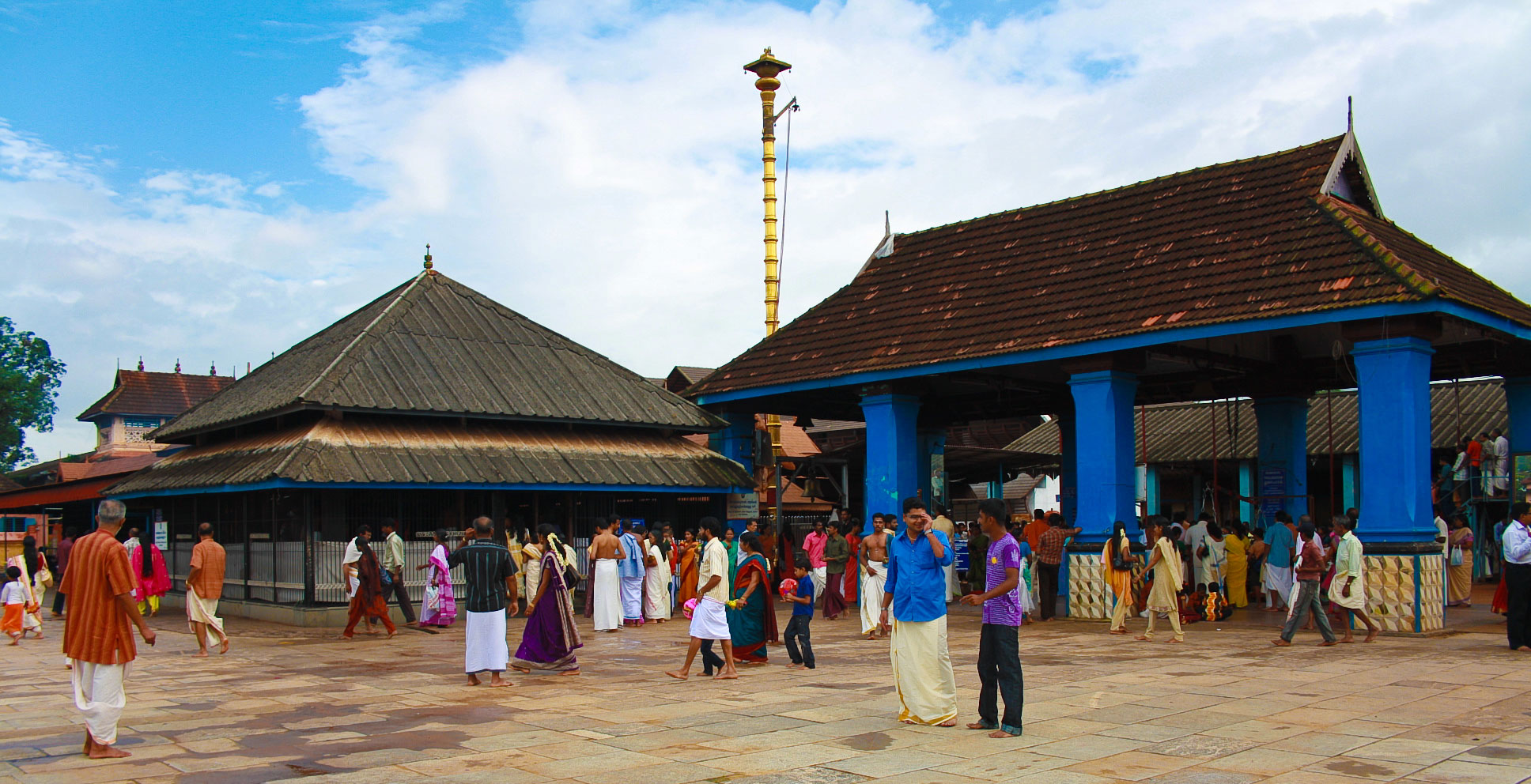
Chottanikkara Temple

== Culture ==
=== Festivals and traditions ===
The Aluva Sivarathri festival at the Aluva Mahadeva Temple (situated on the banks of river Periyar) in Aluva attracts people from around the country.

St. Mary's Orthodox Syrian Cathedral, Piravom is believed to be founded in 405 A.D. and was the headquarters of Archdeacon and St Thomas until the 18th century.

Adi Shankaracharya was born in Kalady, which is considered to be a major pilgrimage centre for Hindus around the world.

Kallil Kshethram is a famous Jain temple near Perumbavoor.

Puthencruz is the regional seat of Syriac Orthodox Church in India, and is where Saint Thomas Syro-Malabar Catholic Church, Malayattoor is located.

The eight-day lent (Ettunombu) festival at St Mary's Jacobite Syrian Valiyapally, Thamarachal attracts many people from all over the state. St. George Orthodox Syrian Church at Kadamattam near Muvattupuzha is very old and was founded by Mar Abo Syrian Metropolitan in the 5th century A.D. He brought a cross from Persia, which is preserved in the church. The festival at the Latin church of Vallarpadam on 24 September attracts people belonging to all religions. The icon of Virgin Mary in this church is credited with many miracles. St. George's Syro-Malabar Catholic Forane Church, Edappally was founded in 593 A.D.

Important pilgrimage sites in Ernakulam are Koonan Kurish St George Orthodox Pilgrim church, Mattancherry; Vadakken Paravoor St Thomas Catholic Church, Malayattoor Pally; and Mor Thoman Jacobite Church, Kothamangalam; and Thrikkunnathu St Mary's Seminary Church, Aluva. The relics of Gregorios Abdul Jaleel are preserved at the St. Thomas Jacobite church North Paravur. Thousands of pilgrims from Kerala culminate on 27 April for the Dhukrono of the Saint. The Feast of Eldho Mor Baselios is celebrated in the tomb church Mor Thoman Church at Kothamangalam every year on 2 and 3 October. The Feast of Paulose Mar Athanasius on 26 January at Thrikkunnathu St Mary's Seminary Church, Aluva, where he is entombed, also attracts thousands.

Gheevarghese Mar Gregorios of Parumala, also known as Parumala Thirumeni, the first saint of Malankara Orthodox Syrian Church from India was born and brought up in Mulanthuruthy.

=== Places of interest ===
- Marine Drive, Kochi
- Kadavumbhagam Mattancherry Synagogue
- Kadavumbhagam Ernakulam Synagogue
- Paradesi Synagogue: Constructed in 1567, only active synagogue in the Kochi.
- Chinese Fishing Nets (Cheena Vala)
- Hill Palace, Tripunithura
- Bolgatty Island
- Willingdon Island
- Dutch Palace: Made in 1568 by the Portuguese. Later re-structured by the Dutch.
- St. Francis Church, Kochi: Originally built in 1503, the oldest European church in India
- Kodanad: Elephant training centre is located here.
- Pareekshit Thampuran Museum
- Kerala Historical Museum: Located at Edappally
- Chendamangalam, a village
- Palium Palace
- Vypeenakotta Seminary
- Bhoothathankettu, a scenic dam site
- St. Thomas Syro-Malabar Catholic Church, Malayattoor: The only international shrine in Asia. Believed to have been visited by St. Thomas, the apostle.
- Wonder La, Kakkanad: Amusement park
- Cherai Beach.
- Kuzhippilly Beach
- Fort Kochi Beach
- Paniyeli Poru
- Ezhattumugham

== Transport ==
=== Road connectivity ===
Three major national highways pass through Ernakulam, namely Panvel - Kochi - Kanyakumari Highway or National Highway 66, National Highway 66 or Kochi - Salem Highway (part of the NSEW corridor), & Kochi - Madurai - Thondi Highway or National Highway 85.

=== Railway station ===
Ernakulam has 17 railway stations. Ernakulam Junction, Ernakulam Town and Aluva are the major stations. Other stations include Angamaly, Tripunithura, Edapally, Mulanthuruthy, Karakutty, Chowara, Kalamassery, Nettoor, Kumbalam, Chottanikkara Road, Kanjiramattom and Piravom Road. The rail routes travel via Thrissur, Kottayam, Cochin H.T., Alappuzha, and Vallarpadam. The Angamaly-Erumely Sabarimala route passes through the district.

=== Airport ===
Ernakulam district has two airports: Naval airport in Willington Island (Old Cochin airport) and Cochin International Airport (CIAL). Civilian air services were transferred to the newly built Cochin International Airport at in 1999; the airport at Willingdon Island continues as a naval air station.

=== Water transport ===
Ernakulam lies in the flat delta region of the Periyar and Moovattupuzha rivers. Water transport is prominent in the district via rivers and lagoons.

== Notable people ==
- Adi Sankaracharya (Saint Advaita)
- Abraham Barak Salem (Jewish Gandhi)
- VD Satheesan Chief Minister of Keralam
- Ajay Kudua (cricketer)
- Swami Chinmayananda (Indian spiritual leader and geetacharya)
- Geevarghese Mar Gregorios of Parumala (Syrian Orthodox Saint)
- Paulose Mar Athanasius (Syrian Orthodox Saint)
- Shadkala Govinda Marar (Carnatic musician)
- Sahodaran Ayyappan (social reformer and former minister of Kochi State)
- K. J. Yesudas (singer)
- Changampuzha (poet)
- Malayattoor Ramakrishnan (novelist)
- NS Madhavan (writer)
- N. A. Naseer (photographer, activist and author)
- Sebastian Paul (politician)
- Simon Britto Rodrigues (politician)
- Feroze V Rasheed (cricketer)
- K Jayaraman (cricketer)
- G. Sankara Kurup (poet)
- P K Vasudevan Nair (former chief minister)
- Balachandran Chullikad (poet and actor)
- Sreesanth (cricketer)
- K. V. Thomas (politician)
- Asin Thottumkal (actress)
- Jayasurya (actor)
- Cochin Haneefa (actor)
- Sreejesh Ravindran (hockey player)
- Sankaradi (actor)
- Salim Kumar (actor)
- T. K. Narayana Pillai (former chief minister of Kerala)
- Jayaram (actor)
- Lalu Alex (actor)
- Hibi Eden (politician)
- K. M. George (politician)
- Francis George (politician)
- Johnny Nellore (politician)
- T. M. Jacob (politician)
- Anoop Jacob (politician)
- Jose Thettayil (politician)
- Revathi (actress)
- Dulquer Salmaan (actor)
- Nivin Pauly (actor)
- Lal (actor)
- Rajeev Ravi (director and cinematographer)
- Subi Suresh (actress and comedian)

== Gallery ==
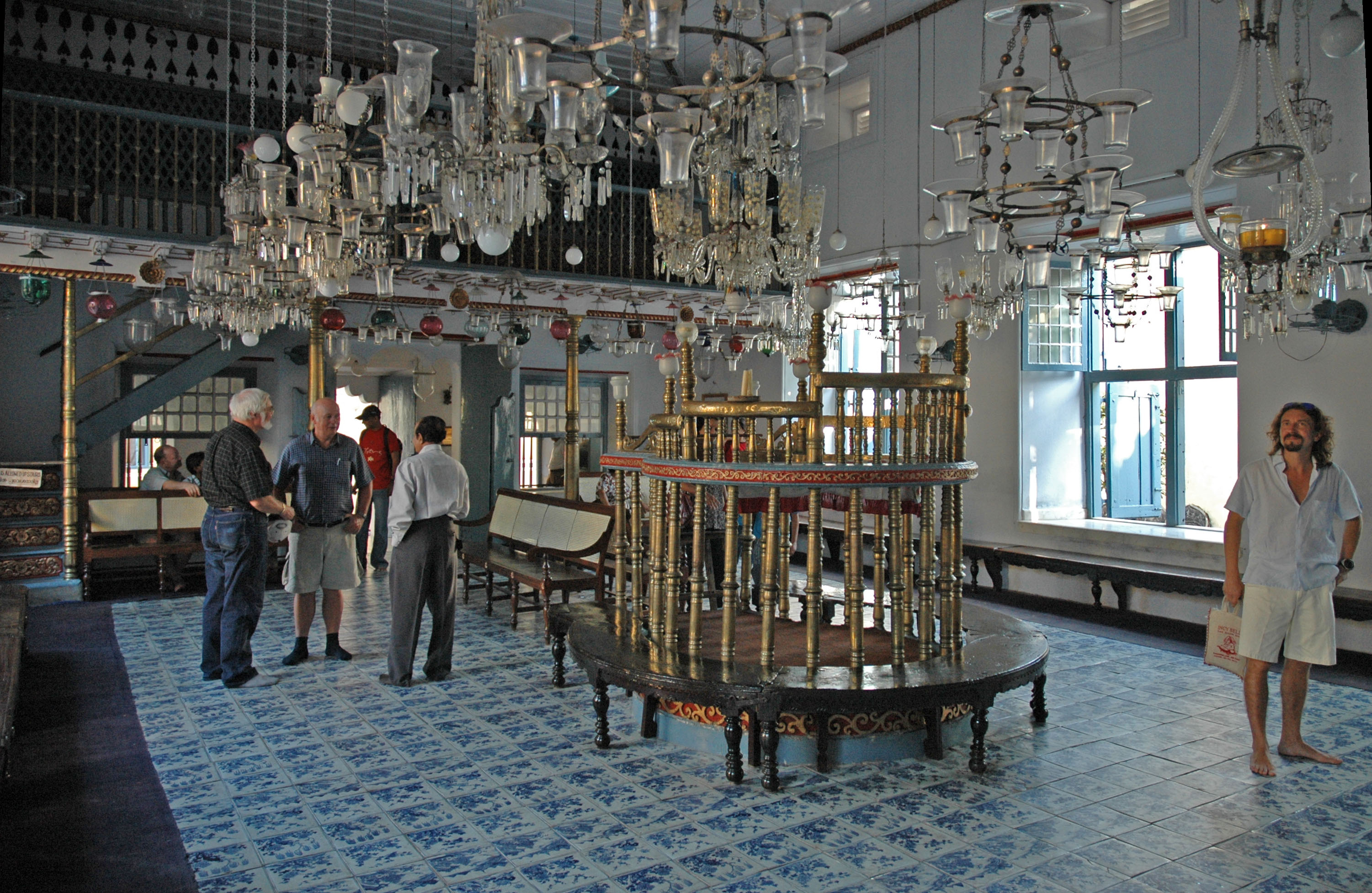
Paradesi Cochin Jewish Synagogue

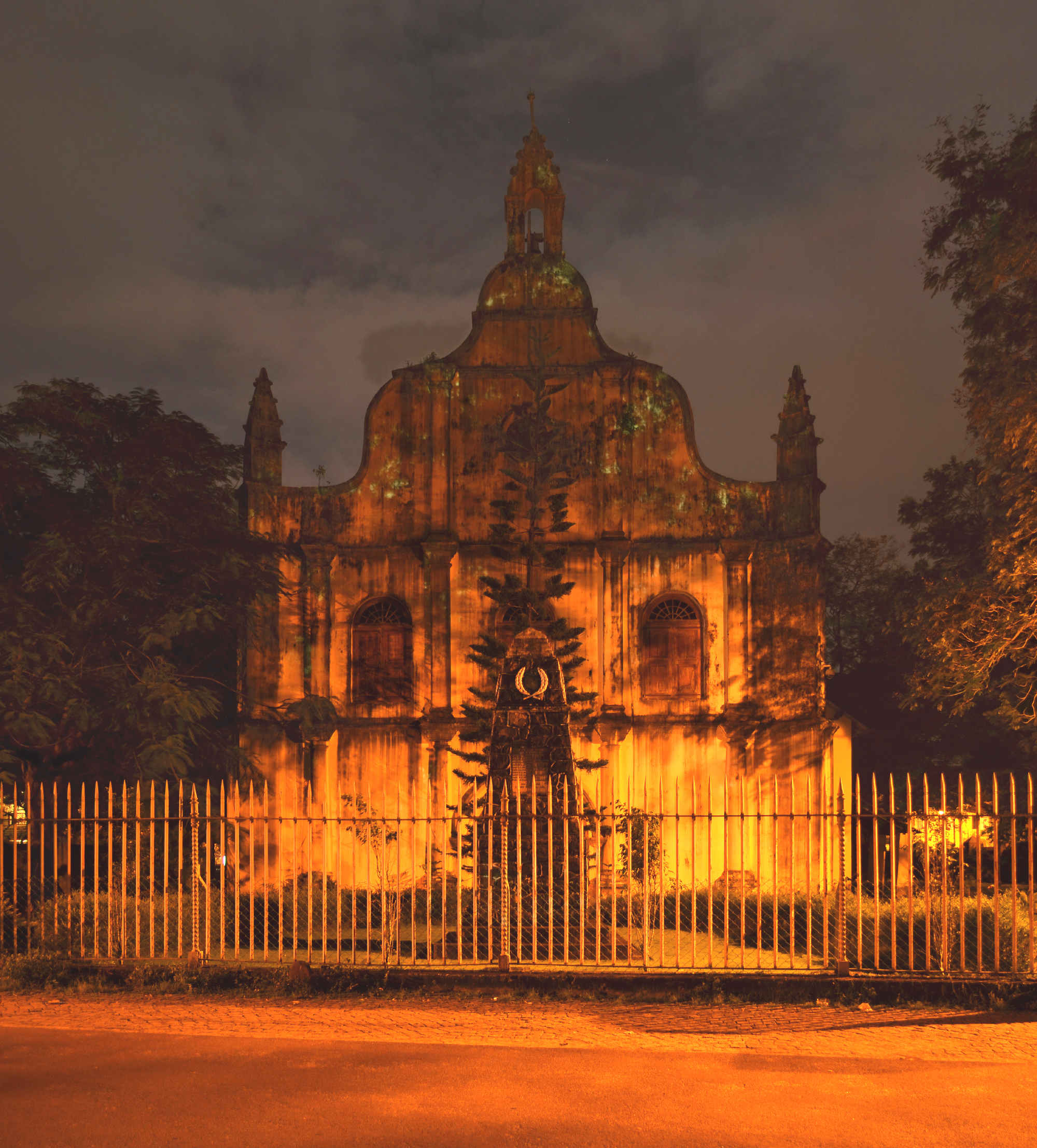
St. Francis Church

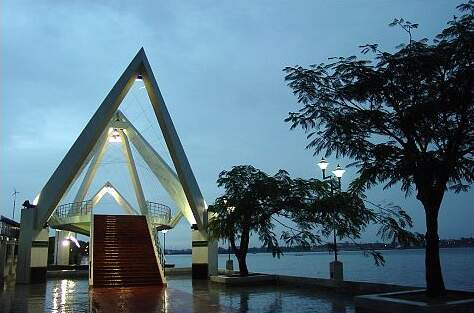
Chinese Net Bridge at Marine Drive walkway

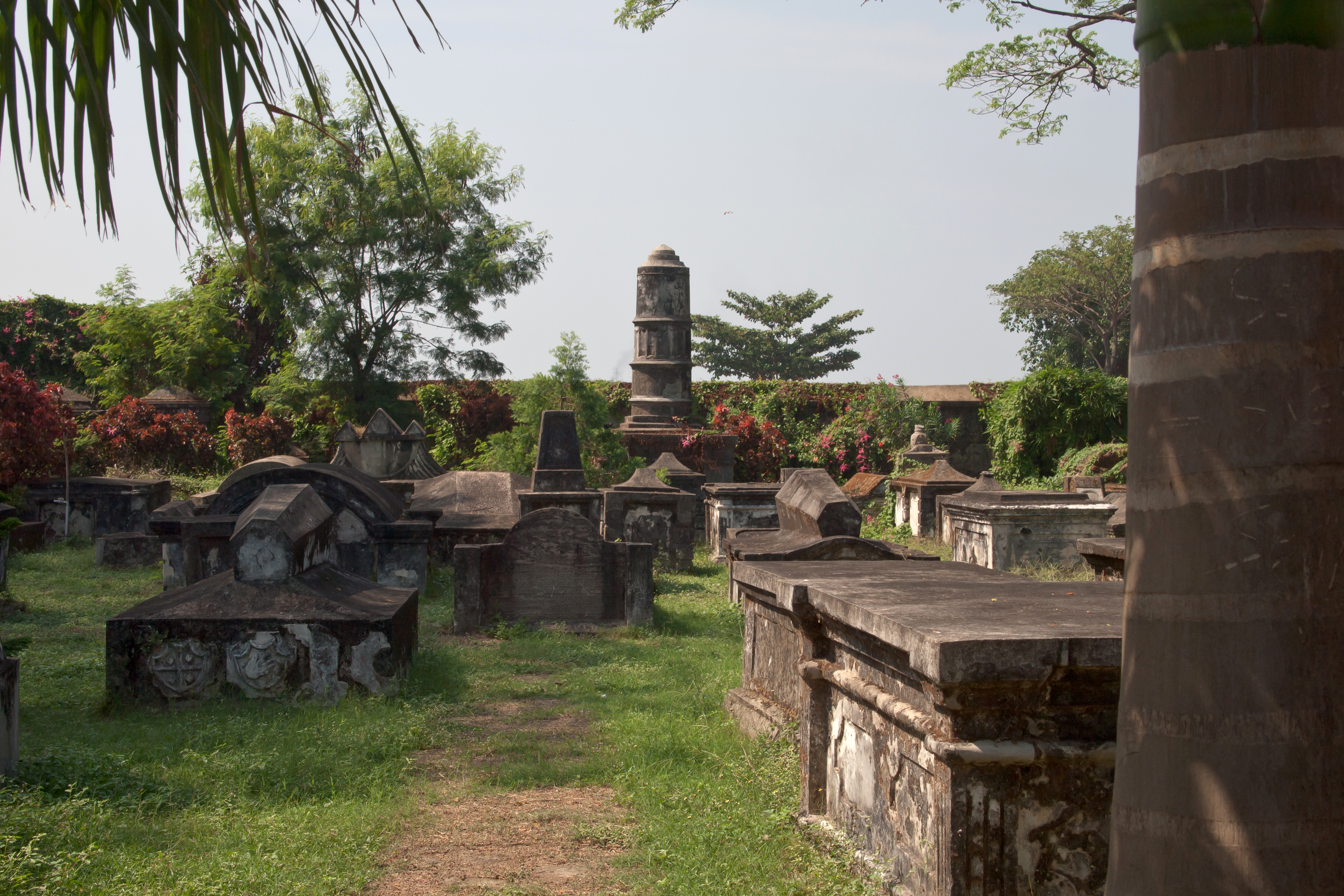
The Kochi Dutch Cemetery in Kochi

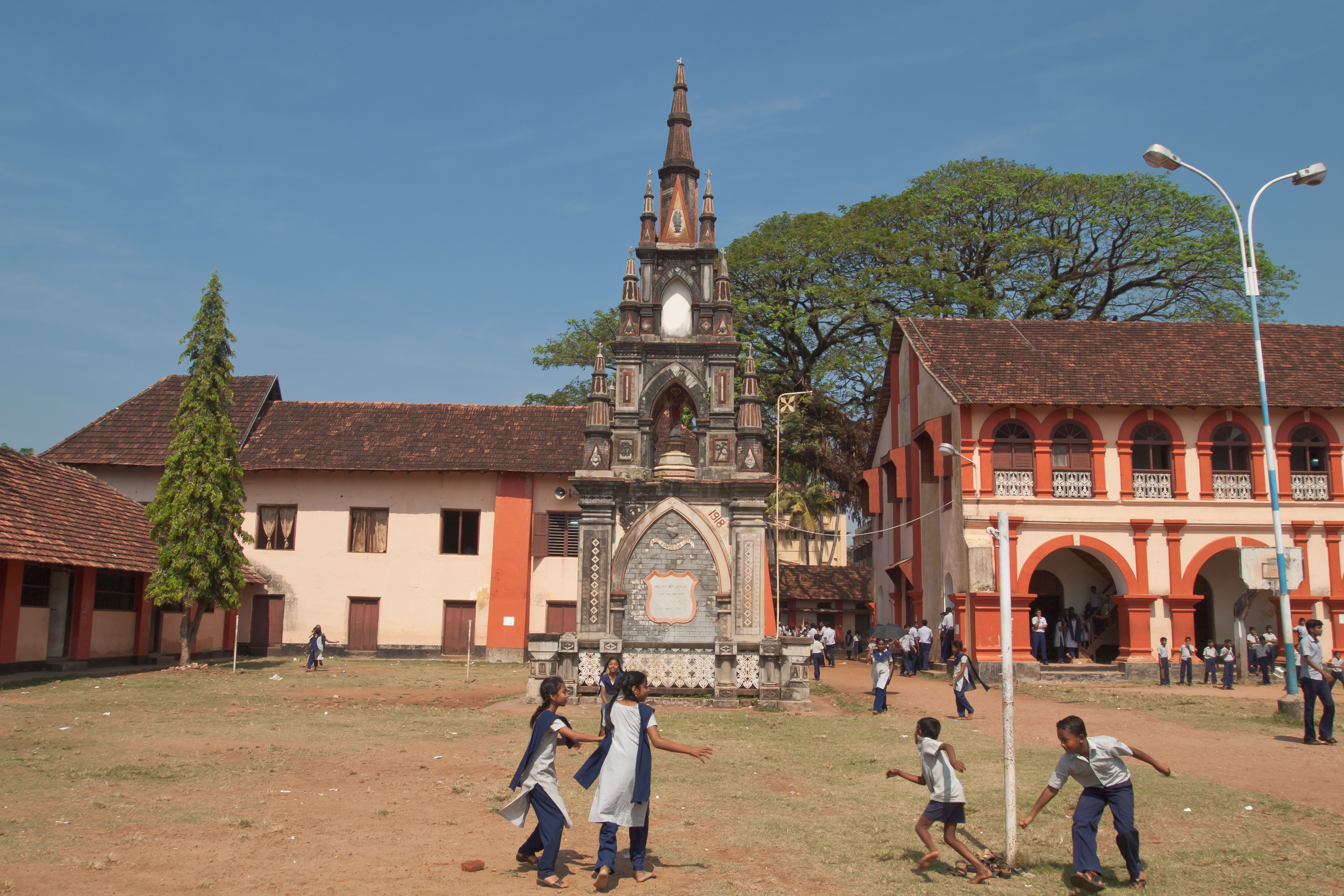
School in Old Kochi

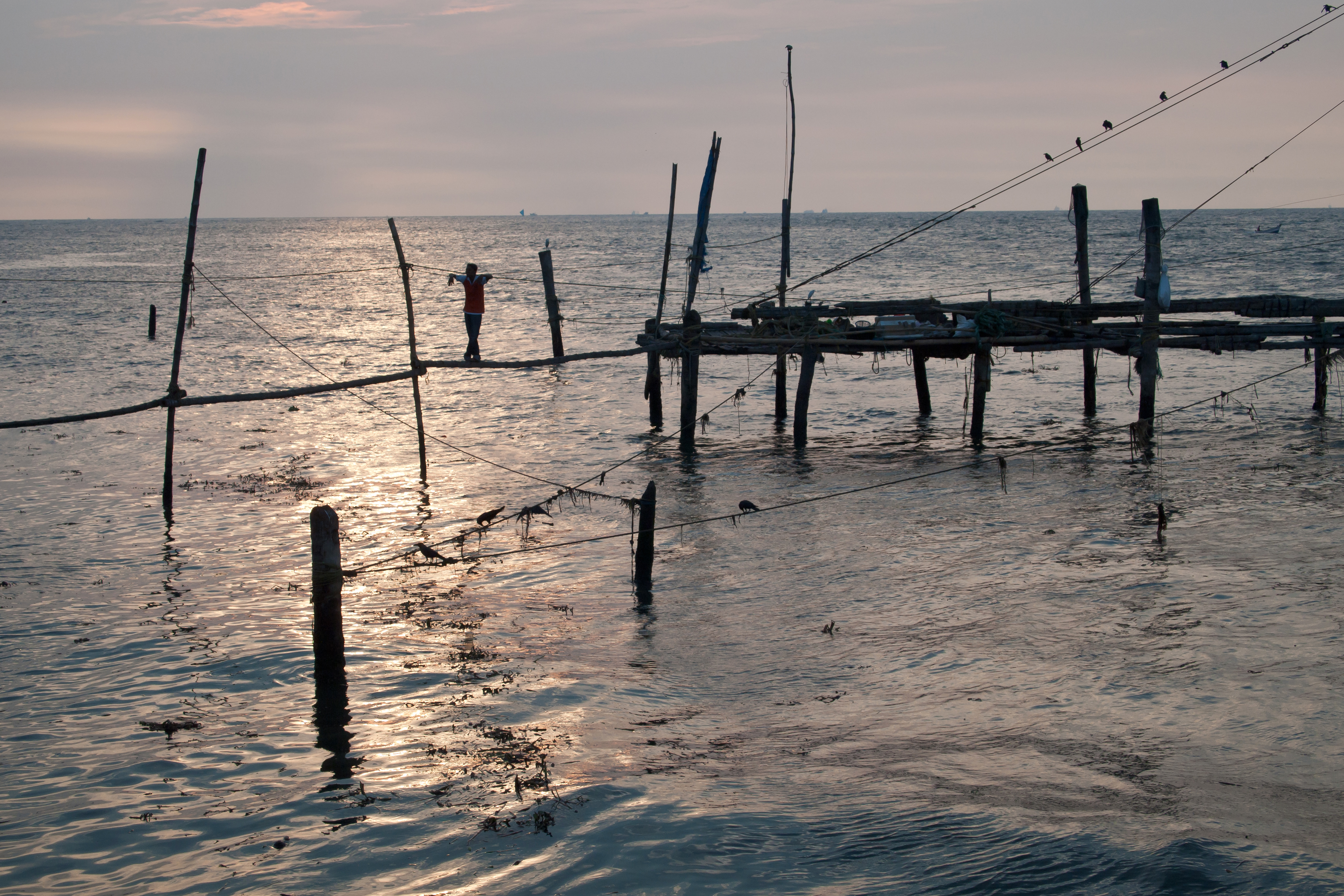
Fishing nets in Fort Kochi

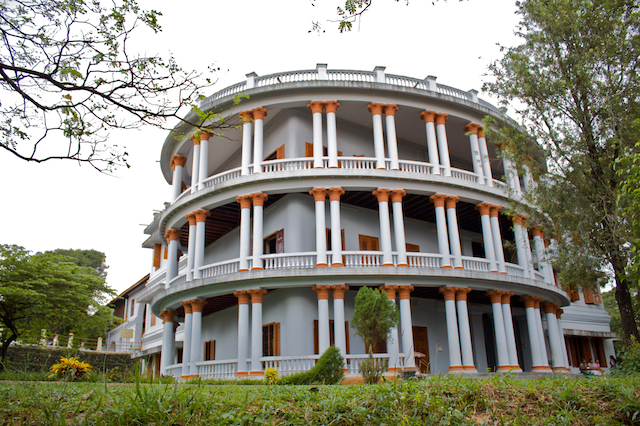
Hill Palace, Tripunithura

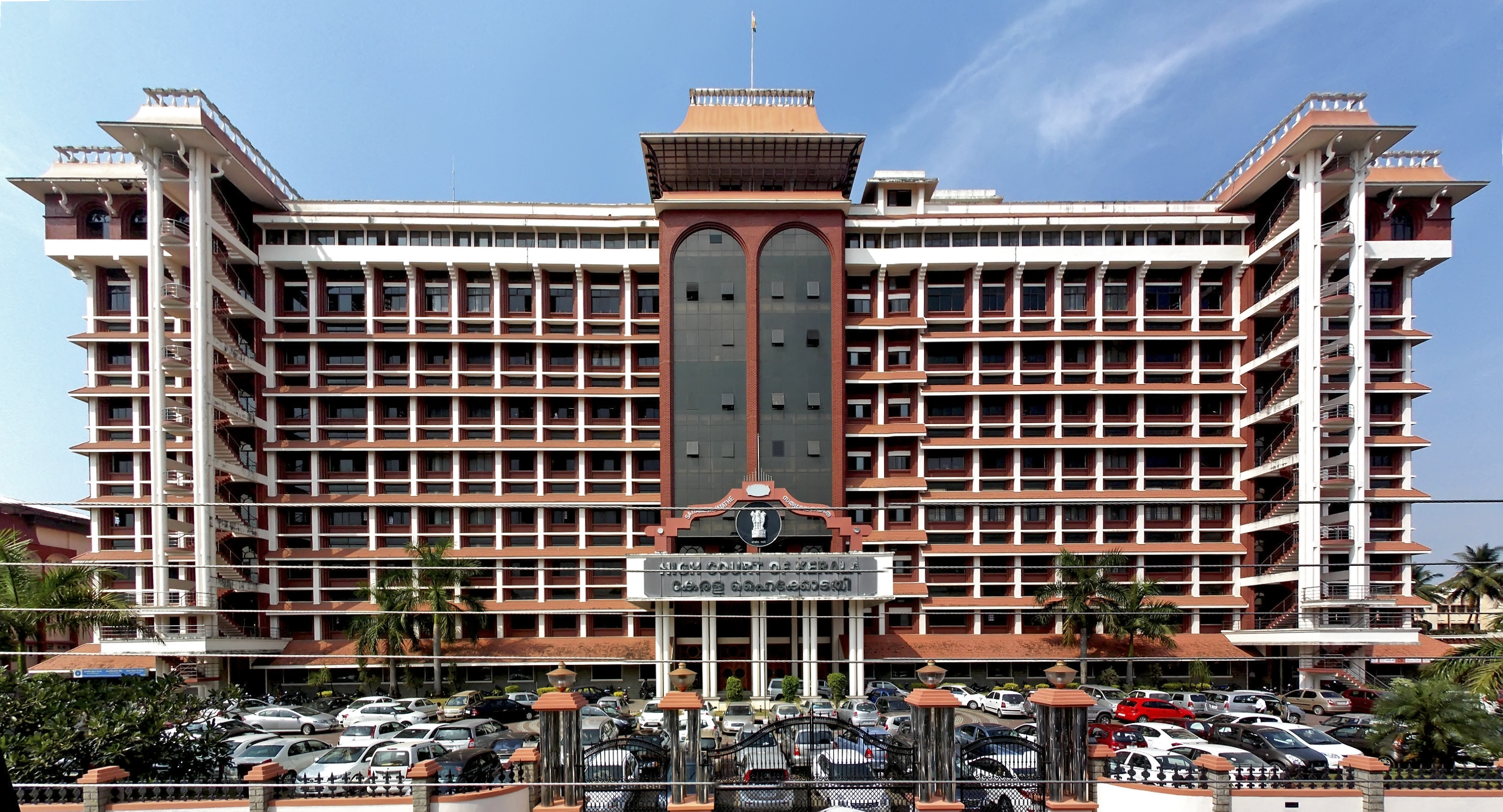
High Court of Kerala at Ernakulam

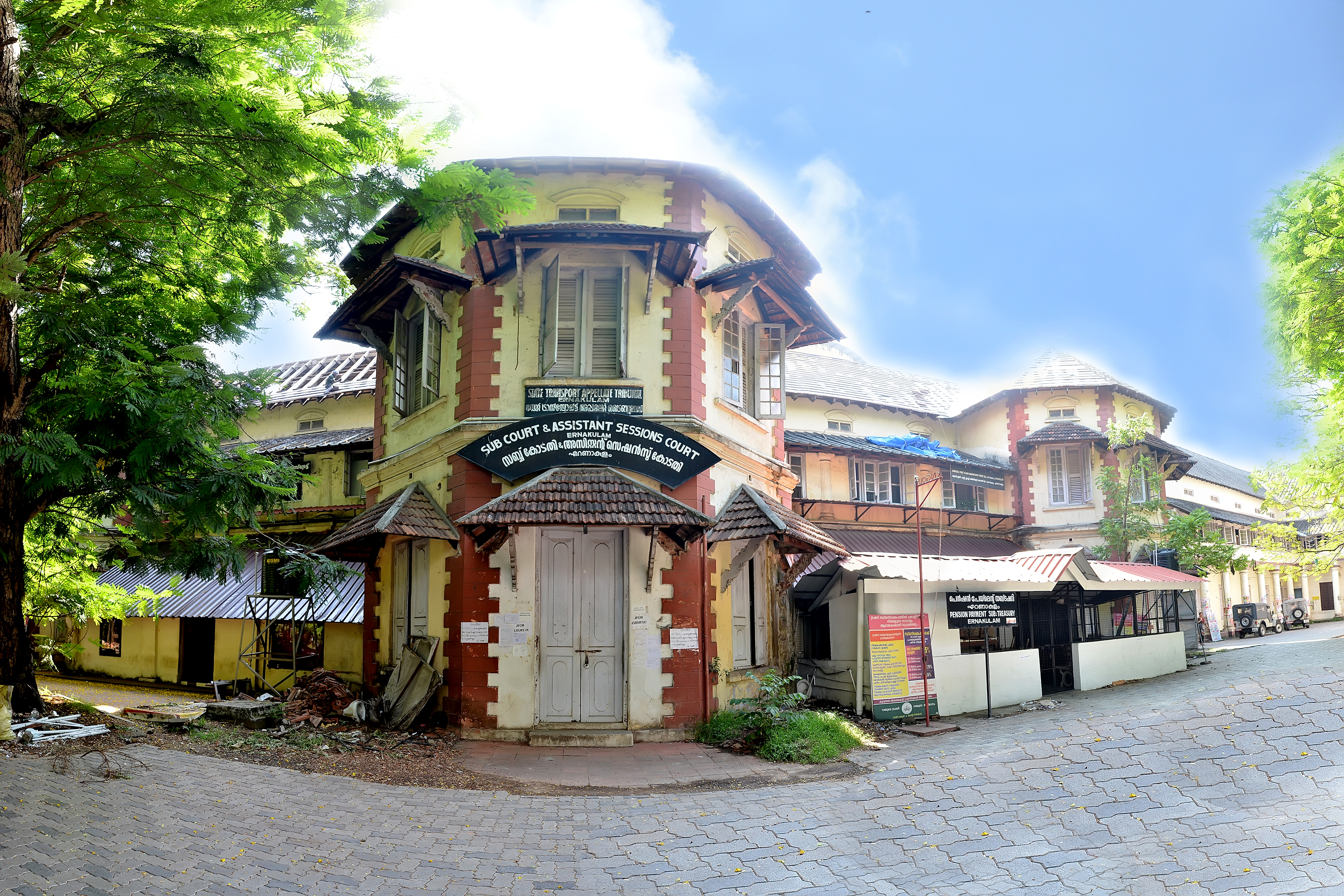
Heritage Building of Ernakulam District Court

== See also ==
- Arayankavu
- Edathala
- Kizhakkambalam
- Kizhakkumbhagom
- Malayattoor
- Payyal
- Perumpalloor
- Thuthiyoor
