= Subramaniya Gopalakrishnan =

Indian cricketer (born 1940)

Subramaniya Gopalakrishnan (full name Nenmara Subramaniya Gopalakrishnan; born 14 September 1940) was an Indian cricketer. He was a right-handed batsman and wicket-keeper who played for Kerala. He was born in Jamshedpur.

Gopalakrishnan made a single first-class appearance for the side, during the 1963–64 season, against Hyderabad. He scored 9 runs in the first innings in which he batted, and 6 runs in the second, though this was not enough to save Kerala from an innings defeat. It was his debut match at Kozhikode.
