= Kizhakkumbhagom =

- village
- Interactive map of Kizhakkumbhagom
- Country: India
- State: Kerala
- District: Ernakulam

Population (2011)
  - Total: 10,791

Languages
  - Official: Malayalam, English
- Time zone: UTC+5:30 (IST)
- Coastline: 0 kilometres (0 mi)
- Climate: Tropical monsoon (Köppen)
- Avg. summer temperature: 35 °C (95 °F)
- Avg. winter temperature: 20 °C (68 °F)

Kizhakkumbhagom (also known as East Kanjoor) is a village located at Kanjoor Town near Kalady in Ernakulam district in the Indian state of Kerala.

== Demographics ==
At the 2011 India census, Kizhakkumbhagom had a population of 10,791 (5,320 males and 5,471 females).
