= Ajay Varma (Kerala cricketer) =

Indian cricketer (born 1963)

Personal information
- Born: 18 February 1963 (age 63); Alleppey, Kerala
- Batting: Right-handed
- Bowling: Right-arm fast

Career statistics
| Competition | First-class | List A |
|---|---|---|
| Matches | 21 | 1 |
| Runs scored | 76 | – |
| Batting average | 3.45 | – |
| 100s/50s | 0/0 | – |
| Top score | 16* | – |
| Balls bowled | 2,779 | 24 |
| Wickets | 48 | 0 |
| Bowling average | 41.85 | – |
| 5 wickets in innings | 1 | – |
| 10 wickets in match | 0 | – |
| Best bowling | 5/82 | – |
| Catches/stumpings | 11/– | 0/– |
- Source: CricketArchive, 31 October 2022

Ajay Varma (born 18 February 1963) is an Indian former cricketer. He played as a bowler for Kerala during the 1980s. He was rated as one of the fastest bowler in his days in south India, he reigned terror in the Kerala cricket circuit with sheer pace and was instrumental in State Bank of Travancore cricket team emerging as a reckoning force in South. His career was cut short by a knee injury. At present he is working as Asst Manager in State Bank of Travancore.
