= Antony Sebastian =

Indian cricketer (born 1978)

Personal information
- Full name: Melaparampil Antony Sebastian
- Born: 17 September 1978 (age 48); Mumbai, Maharashtra, India
- Batting: Left-handed

Domestic team information
- Years: Team
- 2004 - 2008: Kerala
- Source: ESPNcricinfo, 2 August 2020

Antony Sebastian (born 17 September 1978) is a former Indian cricketer who played domestic cricket for Kerala between 2004 and 2008.

He made his first-class debut for Kerala on 25 November 2004 against Orissa in the 2004-05 Ranji Trophy. He made his List-A debut for Kerala on 26 February 2008 against Hyderabad on the 2007-08 Vijay Hazare Trophy.

Sebastian, a left handed batsman for Kerala, mostly served the state as an opener. After his retirement, he represented the state as an assistant coach for the senior team, as well as served, U-25, U-19 and U-15 teams as head coach. He also runs SG cricket school, based at Kochi. He is also a member of Cricket Development Committee of Kerala Cricket Association.
