= Thomas Mathew (cricketer) =

Indian cricketer (born 1961)

Personal information
- Full name: Kalapuracal Thomas Mathew
- Born: 30 July 1961 (age 65); Kozhikode, India
- Batting: Right-handed
- Bowling: Right-arm medium
- Role: Batsman

Domestic team information
- Years: Team
- 1981 - 1990: Kerala
- Source: Cricinfo, 8 August 2020

Thomas Mathew (born 30 July 1961) is an Indian cricketer who has played 37 first-class matches between 1981 and 1990.

Mathew, a right handed batsman for Kerala, served the state as an opening batsman, and has scored over 1000 runs in Ranji Trophy. After his retirement, he represented the state as a selector of Kerala Cricket Association.
