= Payyal =

- town
- Location in Kerala, India
- Coordinates: 10°7′20″N 76°33′40″E
- Country: India
- State: Kerala
- District: Ernakulam

Languages
  - Official: Malayalam, English
- Time zone: UTC+5:30 (IST)
- Vehicle registration: KL-

Payyal is a town in Kerala, India, located in the Nedungapra post office area of Ernakulam District, 10 kilometers from Perumbavoor in the direction of Kothamangalam via Kottappady. The area is characterised by thick green rice fields and coconut plantations.

== Economy ==
Traditionally, Payyal was an important spice trading center in Ernakulam District. Payyal had various retail spice merchants who bought crops from farmers in and around Payyal, and supplied them to mainstream exporters in Kochi. Over time Payyal lost its trading importance, as merchants and trade unions were unable to reach agreement on issues related to their business. Payyal's economy is now based predominantly on agriculture, with commodities like rubber, pepper, ginger, turmeric, plantain, vegetables, coconut, cocoa, and rice cultivated in the area.

Residents live in independent homes and mainly use private or public transportation. Private bus services run to several neighboring towns, and auto rickshaws are also used for small distances. 70% of households own bicycles and 20% own cars.

== Education ==
St. Antoney's Upper Primary School is the only educational institution in Payyal. Residents from the town attend high schools and colleges in nearby cities.

== Healthcare ==
Traditionally residents of Payyal depended predominantly on Nambialil Ayurvedic Nursing home for health care. The nursing home still provides health care to locals, along with various modern hospitals in nearby cities. The local panchayat recently opened a government ayurvedic clinic in Payyal.

== Religion ==
Residents of Payyal follow either Hinduism or Christianity. Devi temple in Panichayam and St. Antoney's Church in Nedungapra are the main places of worship in the town. SNDP Union has a shakha in Payyal.
