= Sreekumar Nair =

Indian cricketer (born 1978)

Sreekumar Rajagopalan Nair (born 2 November 1978) is a former Indian first class cricketer who played for Kerala in domestic cricket. He is a left-handed middle order batsman and slow left arm orthodox bowler. Sreekumar was also a former captain of Kerala. He holds the record for the highest individual score by a Kerala batsman, with a score of 306 not out. He made this score against Services at Fort Maidan in Palakkad, during the 2007 season.
