= Thuthiyoor =

- Location in Kerala, India Thuthiyoor (India)
- Coordinates: 9°59′0″N 76°20′0″E
- Country: India
- State: Kerala
- District: Ernakulam

Languages
  - Official: Malayalam, English
- Time zone: UTC+5:30 (IST)
- Postal code: 682037
- Vehicle registration: KL-07

Thuthiyoor is a region near Kakkanad in the city of Kochi in Kerala, India.

Thuthiyoor shares its boundaries with Chittethukara, Eroor, Kakkanad, and Palachuvadu. The rear wall of Cochin Special Economic Zone forms the north-eastern boundary. It has a history of about 100 years.

The region is host to numerous temples, two catholic churches, and one mosque, including the Sreekrishnaswamy Temple, the only Sreekrishna temple in Thrikkakara Panchayathu, along with six other temples. Thuthiyoor also boasts three schools and two convents. The community is known for its religious diversity and harmonious coexistence. Notable educational institutions in the area include St. Mary's School, St. Charles School, and Bhavans Adarsha Vidyalaya. The St. Charles Convent, established by the Sisters of St. Charles Borromeo in 1993, has been pivotal in introducing English Medium education to the locality through its school, which opened in 1996.

Among the notable features of Thuthiyoor is the "Paaramada," a 300-feet-deep quarry.
