= Sunil Oasis =

Indian cricketer (born 1973)

Personal information
- Born: 3 April 1973 (age 53); Calicut
- Batting: Right handed
- Bowling: Right arm medium

Domestic team information
- Years: Team
- Kerala

Career statistics
Competition	FC	LA
Matches	74	73
Runs scored	3906	1759
Batting average	35.83	30.85
100s/50s	6/26	1/9
Top score	135	116*
Balls bowled	6193	2604
Wickets	89	51
Bowling average	27.62	33.90
5 wickets in innings	1	0
10 wickets in match	0	0
Best bowling	5/27	4/37
Catches/stumpings	88/0	39/0

Sunil Chandrasekharan Oasis (born 3 April 1973 in Kozhikode, Kerala, India) is a retired Indian first class cricketer. He was a right-handed middle order batsman and a right arm medium bowler. He was captain of the Kerala cricket team. He also represented India at the Hong Kong Cricket Sixes in 2008. Currently he is the coach of Thrissur Titans.
