= Feroze V Rasheed =

Indian cricketer (born 1969)

Feroz V Rasheed
Personal information
- Full name: Feroz Valiaveettil Rasheed
- Born: 23 February 1969 (age 57); Ernakulam, Kerala
- Role: Right-hand batsman Right-arm medium Cricket selector
- Source: ESPNcricinfo, 19 July 2020

Feroz V Rasheed is an Indian cricketer, who has played in 68 first-class matches between 1989 and 1998. Rasheed, an all-rounder, was a prominent player for Kerala in the 90's. Rasheed was Kerala's captain when they qualified for the Ranji Trophy Super League, after emerging as the south zone winners in the 1996–97 season.

Rasheed was also a Ranji Trophy selector, as well as the selector for Uttarakhand's U-16, U-19 and U-23 teams.
