= Kerala cricket team =

Indian cricket team

Personnel
- Captain: Vishnu Vinod (FC); Rohan Kunnummal (LA); Sanju Samson (T20)
- Coach: Swapnil Asnodkar
- Owner: Kerala Cricket Association

Team information
- Colors: Dark Blue
- Founded: 1957
- Home ground: Greenfield International Stadium, Thiruvananthapuram
- Capacity: 55,000

History
- First-class debut: Madras in 1957 at Race Course Ground, Madurai
- Ranji Trophy wins: 0
- Vijay Hazare Trophy wins: 0
- Syed Mushtaq Ali Trophy wins: 0
- Official website: KCA
FC kit
LA/T20 kit

The Kerala cricket team is a domestic cricket team based in the Indian state of Kerala. It is in the Elite Group of the Ranji Trophy, the premier first class cricket tournament in India. It was known as Travancore-Cochin cricket team until 1957/58.

Kerala has produced two Indian Test cricketers, Tinu Yohannan and S. Sreesanth. Sanju Samson has represented India in T20Is and ODIs, Sandeep Warrier has represented India in one T20I, while Basil Thampi has a national call-up to his name. The team also lined up ex-Indian International players Sadagoppan Ramesh for two years from 2005 to 2007 and Robin Uthappa, from 2019 to 2022. Kerala has also produced Krishna Chandran, who played at International level for United Arab Emirates.

== Playing history ==
Kerala began competing in the 1957–58 Ranji Trophy, succeeding the Travancore-Cochin cricket team after the states were reorganized. It competed in the South Zone, against Madras/Tamil Nadu, Mysore/Karnataka, Andhra and Hyderabad. In 1957–58 Kerala lost all four matches, three of them by an innings.

In the 1959–60 season, Kerala's Balan Pandit (262*) and George Abraham (198) put up a 410 runs partnership in the fourth wicket, which is the highest in Indian first-class cricket. Pandit's score remained the highest for Kerala in FC format until the 2007–08 season.

Kerala's best season in Syed Mushtaq Ali Trophy was in 2012–13 season where they finished 3rd, missing out from finals after losing the last league stage match to eventual champions Gujarat.

By the end of the 2016–17 season, Kerala had played 302 first-class matches, and won 46, lost 140 and drawn 116. In List A cricket Kerala had played 120 matches, with 47 wins, 71 losses and two ties.

Kerala reached the pre-quarterfinal of Ranji Trophy in the 1994–95 season when they progressed as South zone winners under the captaincy of KN Ananthapadmanabhan. They were qualified for the Super League after emerging as the south zone winners in 1996–97 under leadership of Feroze V Rasheed. Kerala reached plate final in 2002–03 and semifinal in 2007–08.

In November 2017, they progressed to the quarter-finals of the Ranji Trophy for the first time, when they finished second in Group B of the 2017–18 tournament. The following season, they progressed to the semifinals for the first time after beating former champions Gujarat in the last eight.

Kerala reached its first Ranji Trophy final in the 2024–25 season, doing so in dramatic fashion after first innings victories in the quarterfinal and semifinal by one run and two runs respectively.

== Honours ==
Year	Final Result	Captain	Most Runs	Most Wickets
Ranji Trophy
2024–25	Runners-up	Sachin Baby	Mohammed Azharuddeen (635)	Jalaj Saxena (40)

== Governing body ==
The Kerala Cricket Association (KCA) is the governing body for the Kerala cricket team. It was founded on 1951 and is affiliated to the Board of Control for Cricket in India (BCCI) and the Kerala State Sports Authority (KSSA). It is the parent body of the 14 district associations in Kerala.

== Current squad ==
Players with International caps are listed in bold.

Name	Birth date	Batting style	Bowling style	Notes
Batsmen
Rohan Kunnummal	10 May 1998 (age 28)	Right-handed	Right-arm medium	**List A Captain**
Salman Nizar	30 June 1997 (age 29)	Left-handed	Right-arm off break	
Ahammad Imran	22 May 2006 (age 20)	Left-handed	Right-arm off break	
Sachin Baby	18 December 1988 (age 37)	Left-handed	Right-arm off-break	
Abhishek J Nair	6 June 2004 (age 22)	Right-handed	Right-arm off break	
Varun Nayanar	24 October 2002 (age 24)	Right-handed		
Abhishek Pratap Nair	9 August 2000 (age 26)	Left-handed	Right-arm medium	
Abhijith Praveen	5 February 2004 (age 22)	Right-handed	Right-arm medium	
All-rounders
Baba Aparajith	8 July 1994 (age 32)	Right-handed	Right-arm off break	
Akhil Scaria	5 October 1998 (age 28)	Left-handed	Right-arm medium	
Wicket-keepers
Mohammed Azharuddeen	22 March 1994 (age 32)	Right-handed		
Vishnu Vinod	15 February 1993 (age 33)	Right-handed		**First-class Captain**; Plays for **Punjab Kings** in IPL
**Sanju Samson**	11 November 1994 (age 32)	Right-handed		**Twenty20 Captain**; Plays for **Chennai Super Kings** in IPL
Spin-bowlers
Vignesh Puthur	2 March 2001 (age 25)	Right-handed	Slow left-arm unorthodox	
Biju Narayanan	13 April 1995 (age 31)	Left-handed	Slow left arm orthodox	
Vaisakh Chandran	31 May 1996 (age 30)	Right-handed	Right-arm off break	
Jalaj Saxena	15 December 1986 (age 39)	Right-handed	Right-arm off break	
Aditya Sarwate	10 December 1989 (age 36)	Right-handed	Slow left arm orthodox	
Karthik Nair	4 August 1996 (age 30)	Right-handed	Right-arm leg break	
Pace bowlers
MD Nidheesh	5 May 1991 (age 35)	Right-handed	Right-arm medium	
Eden Apple Tom	2 July 2005 (age 21)	Right-handed	Right-arm medium	
Sharafuddeen	14 February 1995 (age 31)	Right-handed	Right-arm medium	
Nedumankuzhy Basil	20 October 1996 (age 30)	Right-handed	Right-arm medium	
KM Asif	24 July 1993 (age 33)	Right-handed	Right-arm medium	
Nikhil Muraleedharan	21 February 2002 (age 24)	Left-handed	Right-arm medium	

Updated as on 17 November 2026

== Support staff ==
Position	Name
Team Manager	Nazir Machan
Head coach	Amay Khurasiya
Assistant coach	Rajeesh Retnakumar
Strength and conditioning Coach	Vysakh Krishna
Physiotherapist	Unnikrishnan RS
Performance Analyst	Srivathsan P B
Throw down Specialist	Gireesh E K
Team Masseur	Jose N
Team Coordinator	Navin Joy Thattil

== Stadiums ==
=== International stadiums ===
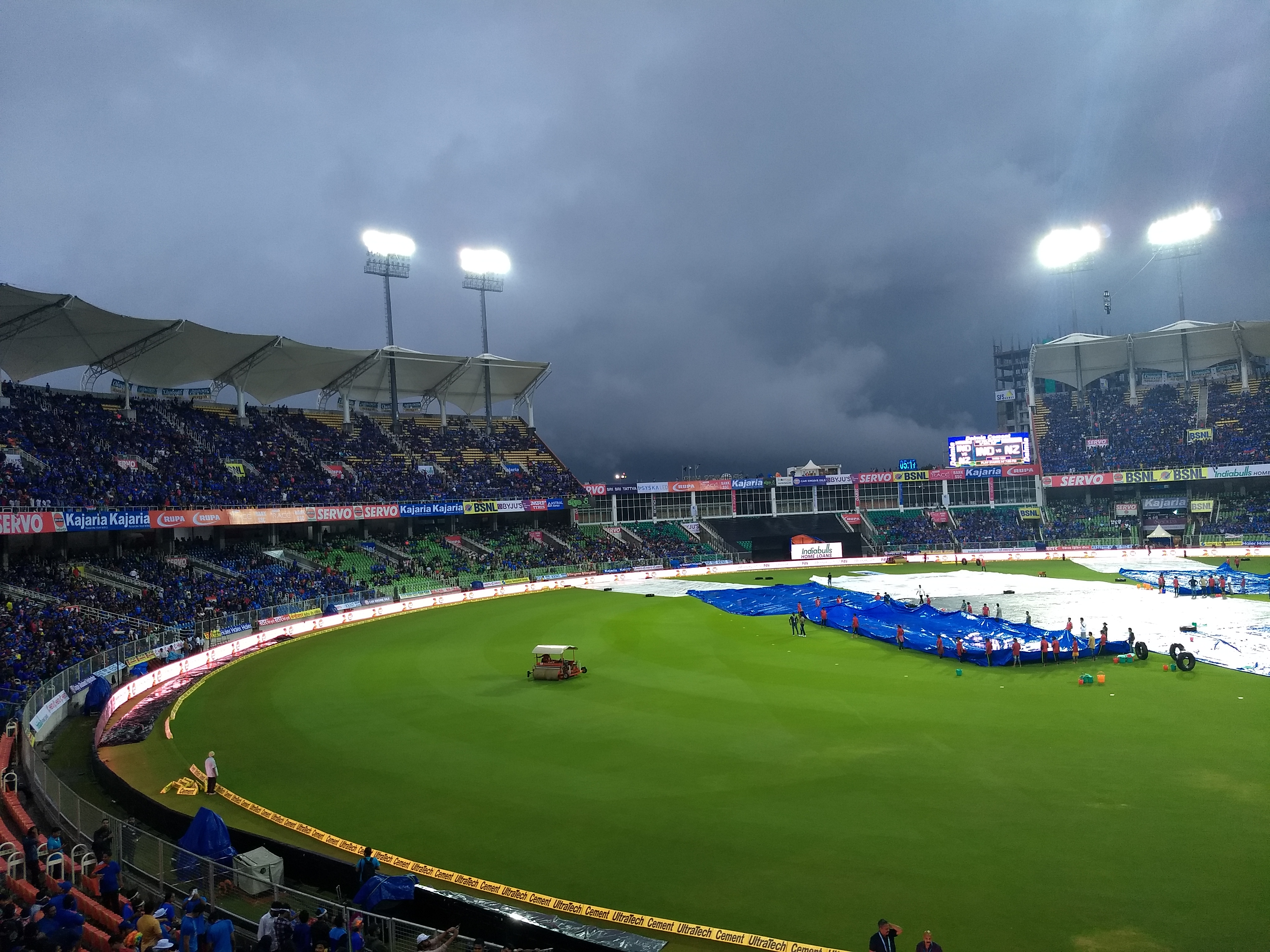
Greenfield International Stadium on an international match-day in 2017

==== Active stadium ====
Sl. No	Name	City	Capacity	No. of matches			First match	Last match	Ref.
Sl. No	Name	City	Capacity	Test	ODIs	T20Is	First match	Last match	Ref.
1	Greenfield International Stadium	Thiruvananthapuram	55,000	0	1	2	7 November 2017	8 December 2019	

==== Former stadiums ====
Sl. No	Name	City	Capacity	No. of matches			First match	Last match	Ref.
Sl. No	Name	City	Capacity	Test	ODIs	T20Is	First match	Last match	Ref.
1	Jawaharlal Nehru Stadium	Kochi	80,000	0	9	0	1 April 1998	8 October 2014	
2	University Stadium	Thiruvananthapuram	20,000	0	2	0	1 October 1984	25 January 1988	

=== Other stadiums ===
Sl. No	Name	City	Capacity	Ref.				
Sl. No	Name	City	Capacity	Ref.	1	Fertilisers and Chemicals Travancore Ground	Ernakulam	5000
2	Conor Vayal Stadium	Kannur	—N/a					
3	Military Maidan	Kannur	—N/a					
4	Police Ground	Kannur	2000					
5	Cochin Refineries Ltd Ground	Kochi	3000					
6	Fort Cochin Parade Maidan	Kochi	3000					
7	Maharaja College Stadium	Kochi	15,000					
8	Premier Tyres Oval	Kochi	10,000					
9	St Paul's College Ground	Kochi	—N/a					
10	Nehru Stadium	Kottayam	18,000					
11	Kozhikode Corporation EMS Stadium	Kozhikode	15,000					
12	Manachira Maidan	Kozhikode	1000					
13	Calicut Medical College Stadium	Kozhikode	10,000					
14	Medical College Ground	Kozhikode	5000					
15	Regional Engineering College Ground	Kozhikode	3000					
16	Malabar State Police Ground	Malappuram	1000					
17	Perintalmanna Cricket Stadium	Malappuram	—N/a					
18	Fort Maidan	Palakkad	10,000					
19	The Government Victoria College Ground	Palakkad	2000					
20	Municipal Stadium	Thalassery	7500					
21	KCA Cricket Ground	Thiruvananthapuram	—N/a					
22	Lakshmibhai National College of Physical Education Ground	Thiruvananthapuram	10,000					
23	Medical College Ground	Thiruvananthapuram	2000					
24	St. Xavier's College Ground, Thumba	Thiruvananthapuram	—N/a					
25	Vellyani Agricultural College Ground	Thiruvananthapuram	10,000					
26	University Stadium	Thiruvananthapuram	10,000					
27	Municipal Stadium	Thrissur	1500					
28	Krishnagiri Stadium	Wayanad	—N/a					
29	Lal Bahadur Shastri Stadium	Kollam	30,000					
30	Sree Narayana College Ground	Kollam	3000					
31	Sanatana Dharma College Ground	Alappuzha	—N/a					
32	Thiruvalla Municipal Stadium	Pathanamthitta	—N/a					
33	Central Stadium	Thiruvananthapuram	—N/a					

== Famous players ==
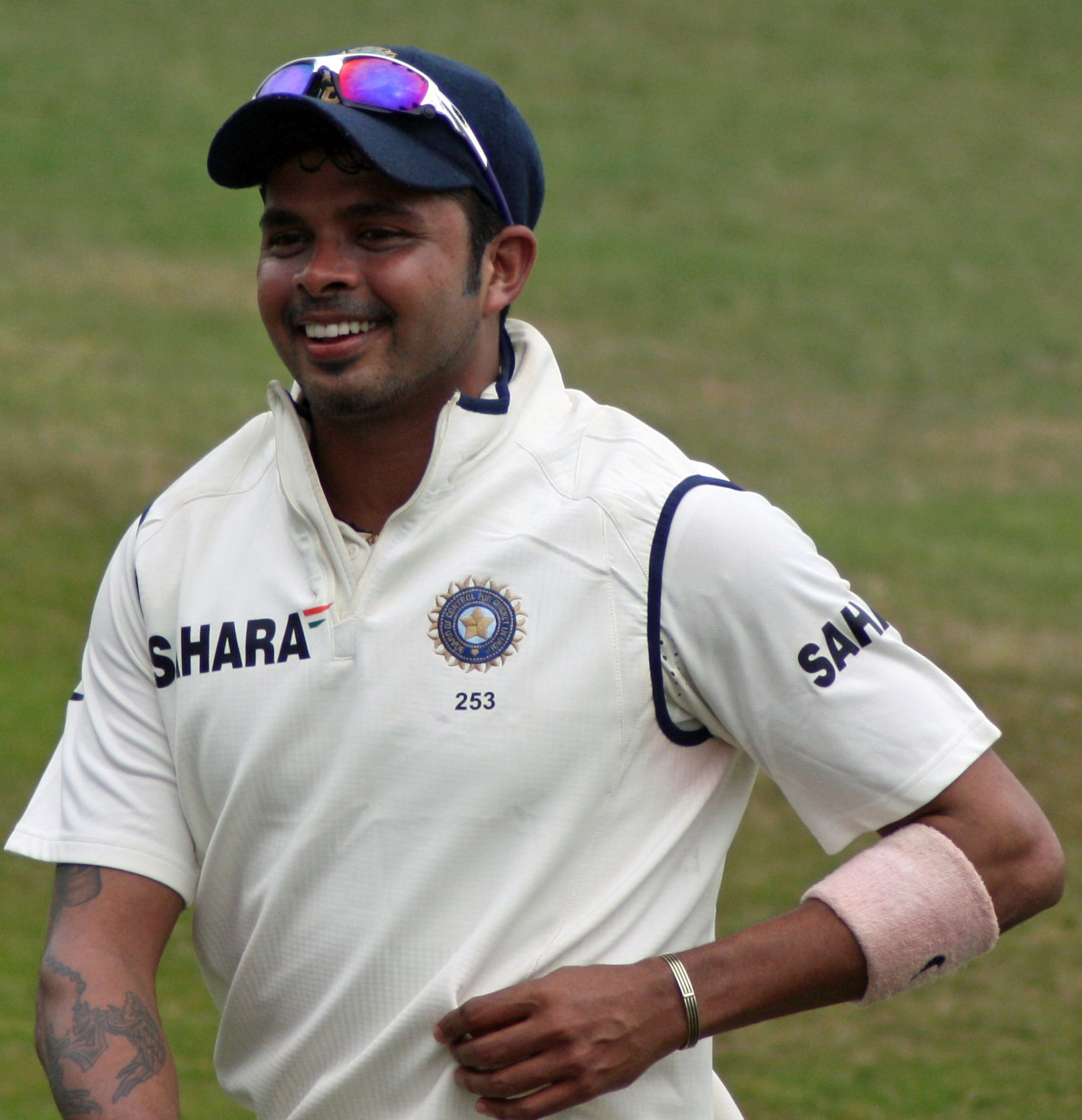
S. Sreesanth has played both for Kerala in state level and for India in international matches.

Players who have represented India
Player	Formats	Debut
Tinu Yohannan	Test	2001
Shanthakumaran Sreesanth	Test/ODI/T20I	2006
Sanju Samson	ODI/T20I	2015
Sandeep Warrier	T20I	2021
Sujith Somasunder	ODI	1996
Sadagoppan Ramesh	Test	1999
Robin Uthappa	ODI/T20I	2006

Players from Kerala who have played international cricket for another country, along with year of debut:

- Krishna Chandran (2014) - United Arab Emirates
- Arun Poulose (2017) - Oman
- Mohammad Sanuth (2020) - Oman

Prominent cricketers at the domestic level:

- Ajay Varma
- Ajay Kudua
- Antony Sebastian
- B. Ramprakash
- Balan Pandit
- Basil Thampi
- Feroze V Rasheed
- Kelappan Thampuran
- K. N. Ananthapadmanabhan
- K Jayaraman
- Padmanabhan Prasanth
- Prasanth Parameswaran
- Raiphi Gomez
- Rohan Prem
- Sachin Baby
- Sony Cheruvathur
- Sreekumar Nair
- Sunil Oasis
- Thomas Mathew
- VA Jagadeesh

== Bibliography ==
- Ramaswami, N.S. (1976). Indian Cricket: A Complete History. New Delhi: Abhinav Publications. ISBN 9788170170440.
- Wisden (2014). The Shorter Wisden India Almanack 2014. Bloomsbury Publishing. ISBN 9781472917188.
- Bose, Mihir (1990). A History of Indian Cricket. Rupa & Company. ISBN 9780233985633.
