= K. Jayaraman =

Indian cricketer (1956–2023)

Personal information
- Full name: Kuttikat Jayaraman
- Born: 8 April 1956; Ernakulam, Travancore–Cochin, India
- Died: 15 July 2023 (aged 67); Kochi, Kerala, India
- Batting: Right-handed
- Bowling: Right-arm offbreak

Domestic team information
- Years: Team
- 1977-78 to 1988-89: Kerala

Career statistics
Competition	First-class
Matches	46
Runs scored	2358
Batting average	29.47
100s/50s	5/10
Top score	133
Balls bowled	375
Wickets	1
Bowling average	116.00
5 wickets in innings	0
10 wickets in match	0
Best bowling	1/11
Catches/stumpings	15/–
- Source: ESPNcricinfo, 27 July 2020

Kuttikat Jayaraman (8 April 1956 – 15 July 2023), also known as K. Jayaram, was an Indian cricketer who played 46 first-class matches between 1977 and 1989.

Jayaraman was a prominent player for Kerala in the 1980s. He gained national coverage in 1986–87, when he scored four hundreds in five matches in the Ranji Trophy and became the first Kerala player to come close to Indian team selection.

Jayaraman was Kerala's captain, and served as Kerala cricket's chairman of selectors. He also served as a national junior selection committee member.

K. Jayaraman died on 15 July 2023, at the age of 67.
