= Ajay Kudua =

Indian cricketer (born 1976)

Personal information
- Full name: Ajay Nandavar Kudua
- Born: 26 March 1976 (age 50); Ernakulam, Kerala, India
- Batting: Right-handed
- Bowling: Right-arm medium
- Role: Batting coach

Domestic team information
- Years: Team
- 1994-95 to 2005-06: Kerala
- Source: ESPNcricinfo, 29 July 2020

Ajay Kudua (born 26 March 1976) is an Indian cricketer who played 61 first-class matches between 1994 and 2005.

Kudua was a key batsman for Kerala. In 2017, he was appointed as the batting coach of the Kerala T20 and 50-over teams.

Kudua has also served the Chennai cricket club, Jolly Rovers, as a player as well as coach for more than 20 years.
