= Ayyanthole =

- Neighbourhood
- Location in Kerala, India Ayyanthole (India)
- Coordinates: 10.52°N 76.18°E
- Country: India
- State: Kerala
- District: Thrissur

Languages
  - Official: Malayalam, English
- Time zone: UTC+5:30 (IST)
- PIN: 680003

Ayyanthole is an administrative and residential neighbourhood in the city of Thrissur, Kerala, India. Ayyanthole is the 53rd Ward of Thrissur Municipal Corporation. Ayyanthole is the administrative center for the Thrissur District. Ayyanthole houses the various state governmental offices, as well as the District and Sessions Courts.

== History ==
"Ayyanthole Ground" is the central point of the ward because it houses a football ground in its vicinity. The area is also called Karshaka Nagar, as homage to its rich agricultural history. Many of the native families have an agrarian background. Ayyanthole, as with other places in Kerala, used to hold large areas of Paddy cultivation. However, the rice farms have since become residential colonies. The residents are predominantly government servants. Ayyanthole has recently become one of the most popular residential areas in Thrissur, especially after the announcement of an international residential enclave nearby causing an expansion of housing development. Ayyanthole also houses the second indoor stadium of Thrissur, under the patronage of the District Officers club.

Before the formation of Thrissur Corporation, Ayyanthole was a Panchayat in Puzhakkal Block. It was merged with Thrissur Municipality to form Thrissur Corporation in 2000. Other Panchayats joined in the Corporation include Villadom, Koorkkenchery, Ollukkara and Ollur panchayats and parts of Nadathara and Kolazhy panchayats.

== Education ==
The Government Law College, Thrissur is one of four run by the government of Kerala is located in Ayyanthole. The college is affiliated with the University of Calicut and offers undergraduate and postgraduate courses in law. The area's schools include Vocational Higher Secondary School, Government High School, Nirmala Convent Upper Primary School and Mata Amritanandamayi School. Apart from these Ayyanthole is very near to a number of educational institutions like Sree Kerala Varma College and various schools in Thrissur town. There are two libraries in Ayyanthole: Puthurkara Desiya Vayanashala and Appan Thampuran Memorial Library. Both libraries have been instrumental in fostering knowledge and cultural traditions in the local populace.

== Medical Facilities ==
There are many state of the art medical facilities available at Ayyanthole. It has a super speciality hospital called West Fort Hospital, which has emergency services. There are also other medical clinics like Mother Hospital, Chandramathi Hospital and other smaller clinics. Numerous pharmacy shops are available but none of them are open round the clock.

== Religion ==
Ayyanthole has a diversity of religious institutions: The Karthyayani, Sree Pannimkulamgara Lakshmivaraha moorthy Kshethram, Thrikumaramkudom Subrahmanya Temple, The Manathitta Mahavishnu, Manathitta Siva temple, Thenjithukavu bhagavathy Temple, Shri Thiruvanath Sri Krishna Temple, St. Mary's Assumption Church which is currently being renovated. Ayyanthole also includes a Mosque. The Karthyayani Temple is one of the prominent places of worship for Hindus in the area. Devi Karthyayani, the reigning deity, is believed to be the daughter of Nanda and Yasoda, who slipped away from the hands of Kamsa. The temple holds the annual Karthika Vilakku festival, as well as it is a participant of the equally popular festival of Thrissur Pooram. In Pannimkulangara Temple chief deity is Varahamoorthi the incarnation of Vishnu along with Goddess Lakshmi. Janmashtami is the main festival of this temple.

== People from Ayyanthole ==
- Sekar Ayyanthole Painter, art teacher and former president of Kerala Chithrakala Parishath
- Rama Varma Appan Thampuran, popularly known as Appan Thampuran, well known Malayalam writer lived here. The house where he lived has been maintained by kerala Sahitya Academy and declared as a memorial to himRamavarma Appan Thampuran Memorial
- P. Ramdas, First Malayalam Movie Maker of "News Paper Boy"
- N R Anil Kumar, Indian chess player
- Varada Jishin, Actor
- Tom Emmatty, Malayalam Movie Director

== Other places of interest ==
Lulu Convention Centre is the largest in Kerala and the second largest in India is located at this place.

Sobha City Mall, Sobha Developers Limited (Sobha Ltd.) Sobha City, a housing project is built at Puzhakkal near Ayyanthole.

== See also ==
- Thrissur
- Thrissur District
