= Puzhakkal =

Puzhakkal Puzhakkal Padam
- CBD
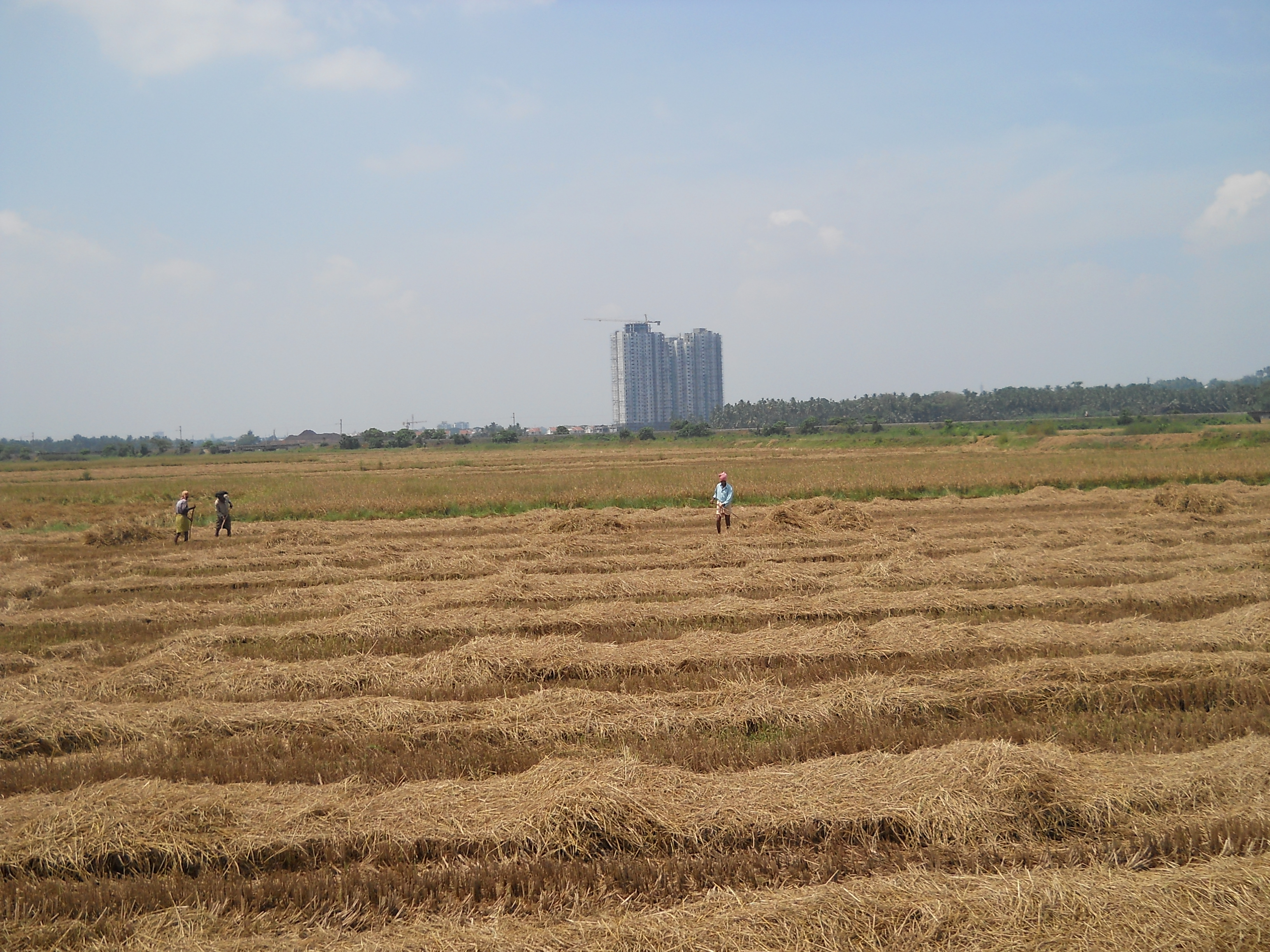
- Sobha City in Puzhakkal
- Interactive map of Puzhakkal
- Country: India
- State: Kerala
- District: Thrissur

Government
  - Body: Thrissur Municipal Corporation, Adat Grama Panchayath

Languages
  - Official: Malayalam, English
- Time zone: UTC+5:30 (IST)
- Vehicle registration: KL-08
- Nearest city: Thrissur
- Civic agency: Thrissur Municipal Corporation

Puzhakkal, also Puzhakkal Padam, is part of Puzhakkal block of Thrissur. A decade ago, Puzhakkal was a vast paddy field situated in the two sides of State Highway 69 (Kerala) going to Kunnamkulam. The place is named after Puzhakkal River, which flows through this region. Now, it has become the most developed suburban area of Thrissur city. Many of the major nerve centres of Thrissur City, including the Thrissur Collectorate, Vilangan Hills, Amala Institute of Medical Sciences, Central Sanskrit University, Government Law College, Thrissur, Kendriya Vidyalaya, District Industries Centre of Kerala Govt., Ministry of Micro Small and Medium Enterprises under Government of India (MSME), Lulu Convention Center and many more are in the block. Many major automotive companies have commercial spaces here, including Hero Motors, Tata Motors, Nissan, Hyundai, Toyota, Suzuki, Honda and more. A national-level tennis academy is also attracting tennis players here.

India's second largest and Kerala's largest international convention center, Lulu Convention Centre, is situated in Puzhakkal. Sobha Group's Sobha City Mall and Sobha City, Kerala's first and currently biggest integrated township is here with villas and high-rise luxury apartments, the only one of same in state having helipad facilities. Recently boating services for tourism have started across river. KINFRA is setting up an industrial park in Puzhakkal. West fort Hitech hospital, a specialty healthcare center, is also in here.

Puzhakkal is known for the "Dharmasastha temple" where the presiding deity is Lord Ayyappa. The temple receives many visitors every year during the traditional sabarimala season between October and January. The St Mary's church in Puzhakkal is another nearby place of worship. The church has an affiliated school which remains the only school in the Puzhakkal block.

The area has lush green paddy fields and three canals flowing through them as part of the Peechi irrigation project.

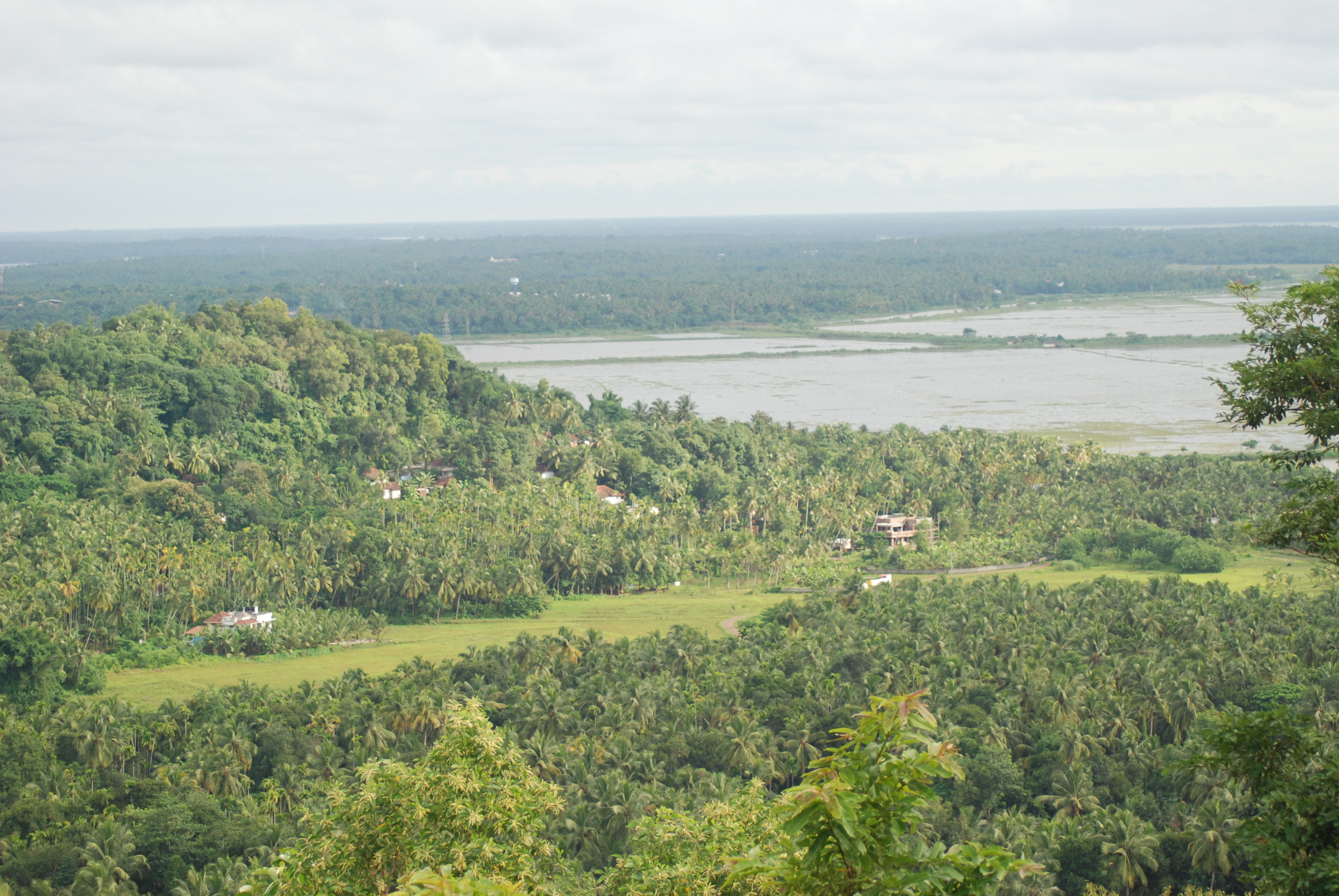
View of Puzhakkal paadam from Vilangan Hills

== See also ==
- Thrissur District
