= Chiramel =

Chiramel is an Indian surname. Notable people with the name include:

- Davis Chiramel, Indian Syro-Malabar Catholic Church priest
- Gabriel Chiramel (1914–2017), Indian Syro-Malabar Catholic priest, educationist, zoologist, author, and social reformer
- Mariam Thresia Chiramel (1876–1926), Indian saint
