= Maarconi Mathaai =

2019 Malayalam film directed by Sanil Kalathil

- Theatrical poster
- Directed by: Sanil Kalathil
- Written by: Sanil Kalathil
- Screenplay by: Sanil Kalathil; Rejishh Midhila
- Produced by: Premachandran A.G.
- Starring: Jayaram; Vijay Sethupathi; Athmiya Rajan; Aju Varghese
- Cinematography: Sajan Kalathil
- Edited by: Shameer Muhammed
- Music by: M. Jayachandran
- Production company: Satyam Videos
- Release date: 11 July 2019
- Running time: 150 minutes
- Country: India
- Language: Malayalam

Maarconi Mathaai is a 2019 Indian Malayalam-language comedy drama film written and directed by Sanil Kalathil, who directed Uthara. The film starring Jayaram (as the title character), Vijay Sethupathi and Athmiya Rajan in the lead roles. It marks Vijay Sethupathi's debut in Malayalam cinema and the 100th film appearance of actor comedian Aju Varghese. The film was dubbed in Telugu as Radio Madhav. This movie was a box-office failure. The film was released in Tamil as Kadhal Kadhai Sollava (2026) with cast track reshot with Nakkhul and Rittika Sen in lead roles and an additional song composed by Sharreth.

== Plot ==
Mathai is an ex-soldier who now works as a security guard in a bank. He is friendly with everyone, and the film initially spends some time establishing his cheerful and kind nature. In the village, he is fondly called “Marconi” because he helps tune radio signals for people.

Early in the film, we see Kunjachayan, an elderly man who is bedridden due to poor health. Mathai visits him with some friends and takes him out for a ride. Kunjachayan enjoys the outing and reminisces about his love story with his late wife. Mathai lightens his mood by offering him a special drink. At the bank where Mathai works, he is well-liked by everyone. Another important character is Sarahkunjamma, an elderly woman who works as the bank's sweeper. Her happiest moments come from chatting with Mathai.

Mathai's friends often pressure him to get married, but he refuses and frequently repeats his philosophy: “Life alle jeevitham.” Eventually, due to his friends’ insistence, he agrees to meet a girl named Treesa. Although the meeting goes well, the marriage does not take place. Around the same time, actor Vijay Sethupathi arrives in Kerala to promote his new film and participates in a radio call-in program as part of the promotions.

After Sarahkunjamma passes away, a young woman named Anna joins the bank as the new sweeper. She is cheerful, simple, and quickly wins everyone's affection. One day, a bank employee named Antony behaves inappropriately toward Anna. Mathai witnesses the incident, warns Antony, and Antony shamefully apologizes and leaves. Anna begins to care deeply for Mathai and often packs food for him.

Mathai's friends encourage him to fall in love with Anna, but he reveals the painful story from his past. As a child, he had fallen in love with a girl named Thresia, but her father disapproved of the relationship and physically punished her. The incident deeply hurt Mathai and made him withdraw from romance. His friends, however, urge him to let go of the past and accept his feelings for Anna.

Mathai gradually realizes his feelings while listening to Sethupathi's radio program. One day, he calls the show and shares his life philosophy and thoughts on love with Sethupathi, who is impressed by his sincerity and affectionately calls him “Mathayiooo.” Later, Mathai gathers the courage to confess his love to Anna, but fails. Instead, he writes her a love letter. Unfortunately, the letter accidentally falls into the hands of the bank staff. Antony uses the opportunity to take revenge on Mathai and humiliates him in front of everyone. Even the bank manager and other employees mock him and consider his actions inappropriate.

Heartbroken and humiliated, Mathai apologizes to everyone, including Anna, and suddenly leaves the village. The villagers blame Anna for hurting Mathai and causing him to disappear. Later, Anna calls the same radio program and confesses her feelings for Mathai. Sethupathi announces on the show that Mathai should be found and informed about Anna's love. He also spreads the message through social media. Someone eventually reports that Mathai was last seen in Goa.

Determined to find him, Anna travels to Goa with the help of a stranger. With the assistance of Mathai's acquaintances there, she searches tirelessly. The radio show team also tries to trace him and learns that he was last seen traveling with a group of Greek gypsies. Although many people give up the search, Anna refuses to lose hope.

One day, Anna meets a homeless man and shares tea with him, just as Mathai used to do. The man asks if she is Anna and then leads her to the gypsies. There, she finally discovers Mathai.

During the final broadcast of the radio show, Sethupathi becomes emotional while celebrating the reunion of Mathai and Anna. He warmly calls out “Mathayiooo” and asks him for a hug. Mathai embraces him and kisses him on the cheek. The film concludes with a celebratory song depicting the wedding of Mathai and Anna, with Sethupathi joining in the festivities.

== Cast ==
- Jayaram as 'Marconi' Mathai
  - Al Sabith as young Mathai
- Vijay Sethupathi as Himself
- Athmiya Rajan as Anna
- Shamna Kasim as Treesa
- Tini Tom as Babu
- Joy Mathew as Luckochan
- Alphy Panjikaran as Reena
- Ramesh Thilak
- Devi Ajith as Deepa
- Lakshmi Nakshathra as RJ Lakshmi
- Lakshmi Priya as Lali
- Aju Varghese as Britto
- Alencier Ley Lopez as Kunjachayan
- Sudheer Karamana as Vijayan
- Mamukkoya as Kunjikka
- Narain as CI Eesho Tharakan, Anna's friend
- Reena Basheer as Mary
- Mukundan in a Cameo Appearance
- Anarkali Marikar as Cameo Appearance
- Lakshmi Nakshathra as Radio Jockey, Cameo appearance
- Sidhartha Siva as Cameo Appearance
- Mallika Sukumaran as Renu, Cameo Appearance
- Sharath Sathyakumar as Groom Johnny Kunju
- Surjith Gopinath

Tamil version

- Nakkhul as Naveen
- Rittika Sen as Shreya
- Siva as Ravichandran
- Suresh as Businessman
- Kalyani Natarajan as Shreya's mother
- Cool Suresh as Mechanic

== Production ==
In August 2020, a distribution house named Rasi Media Makers bought the Tamil dubbing rights of the film and made an announcement that their first venture would be with Vijay Sethupathi. The actor later called out the studio for spreading untrue rumours about him playing the film's lead role. In early 2021, the film was dubbed and partially reshot in Tamil as Kadhal Kadhai Sollava with Nakul and Rittika Sen joining the shoot.

== Soundtrack ==
Marconi Mathai

Soundtrack album by M. Jayachandran
- Released: 17 June 2019
- Recorded: 2019
- Studio: Muzik Lounge Studios, Chennai; My Studio Cochin
- Genre: Soundtrack
- Length: 18:22
- Language: Malayalam
- Label: Satyam Audios

M. Jayachandran chronology
Odiyan (2018)	Marconi Mathai (2019)	Mamangam (2019)
External audio
- Audio Jukebox on YouTube

The soundtrack is composed by M. Jayachandran, while the lyrics are by Anil Panachooran and B K Harinarayanan.

Track listing
No.	Title	Lyrics	Singer(s)	Length
1.	"Thotte"	B K Harinarayanan	Unni Menon, Ala B Bala	3:59
2.	"Ithentho" (Female chorus: Ala B Bala, Nincy Vincent, Ganga; Male chorus: Ajay Gopal, Bhanu Prakash, Unni Elayaraja)	B K Harinarayanan	K. S. Harishankar	3:22
3.	"Enna Parayana" (Chorus: Ala B Bala, Nincy Vincent, Ganga)	Anil Panachooran	Ajay Gopal, Bhanu Prakash, Sangeetha Sajith, Nikhil Raj	3:34
4.	"Nanba" (Female Chorus: Ala B Bala, Nincy Vincent, Ganga)	B K Harinarayanan	Yazin Nizar, Haricharan	1:53
5.	"Paathiravil"	B K Harinarayanan	Yazin Nizar, Shreya Ghoshal	3:31
6.	"Enna Parayana" (Remix)	Anil Panachooran	Ajay Gopal, Bhanu Prakash, Sangeetha Sajith, Nikhil Raj	2:03
Total length:				18:22

== Reception ==
The Times of India gave 2.5 out of 5 stars and wrote, "Marconi Mathai is a modern-day sermon for love glossed over with fresh paint to look like a fairy tale. Minus a few sexual innuendos that over the years we've come to pardon Jayaram for, Maarconi Mathaai is a no-brainer, feel-good, family entertainer."

Deccan Chronicle rated the film 2 out of 5 and wrote, "The film is let down by a weak script and an old storyline that has been done to death. Jayaram playing a romantic lead is a little hard to digest. Athmeeya has played her role with finesse. The music is decent and the cinematography must be mentioned specially."

The Indian Express gave 1 out of 5 starts and wrote, "Maarconi Mathaai feels like a desperate attempt to please the crowd by rehashing old tricks from the how-to-make-a-superficial-feel-good-film book."

Firstpost gave 0.5 out of 5 and wrote "Marconi Mathai has the air of being a film that thinks it is addressing crucial existential questions. Let me assure you, Mr Kalathil, it is not."

Sify rated the movie 1.5 out of 5 and wrote "film lacks a credible script and after a while the story just meanders along without any direction."
