= Geography of Thrissur =

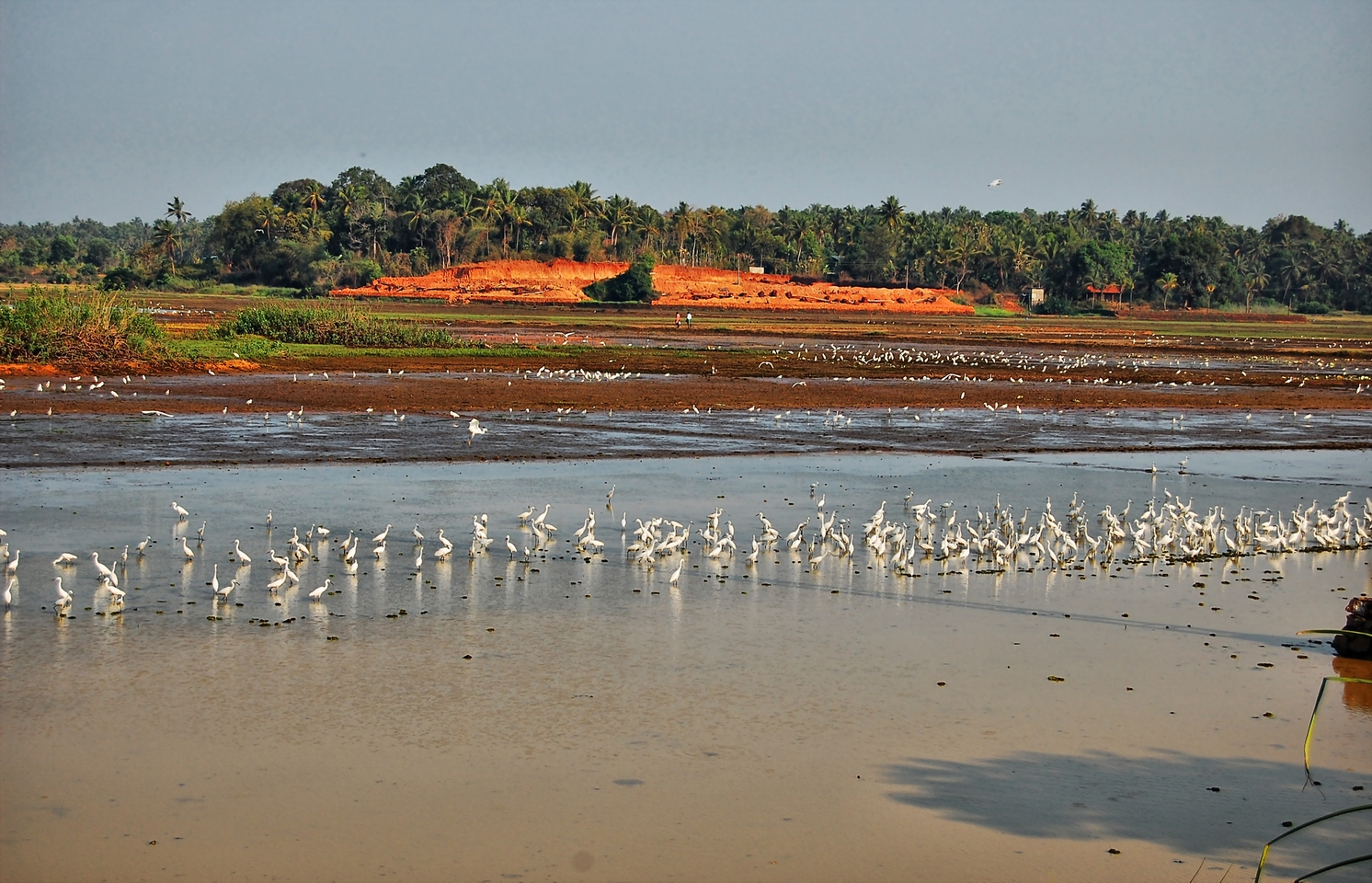
A view of Kole Wetlands with birds, a scene from Thomana in Thrissur Metropolitan Area

The city of Thrissur is situated in the southwest of the South Indian state of Kerala of Thrissur district. A landlocked city, Thrissur is located on a hillock which is surrounded by Thrissur Kole Wetlands. Thrissur district borders with Palakkad district in east, Malappuram district in the north, Ernakulam district in the South and Arabian Sea in the west.

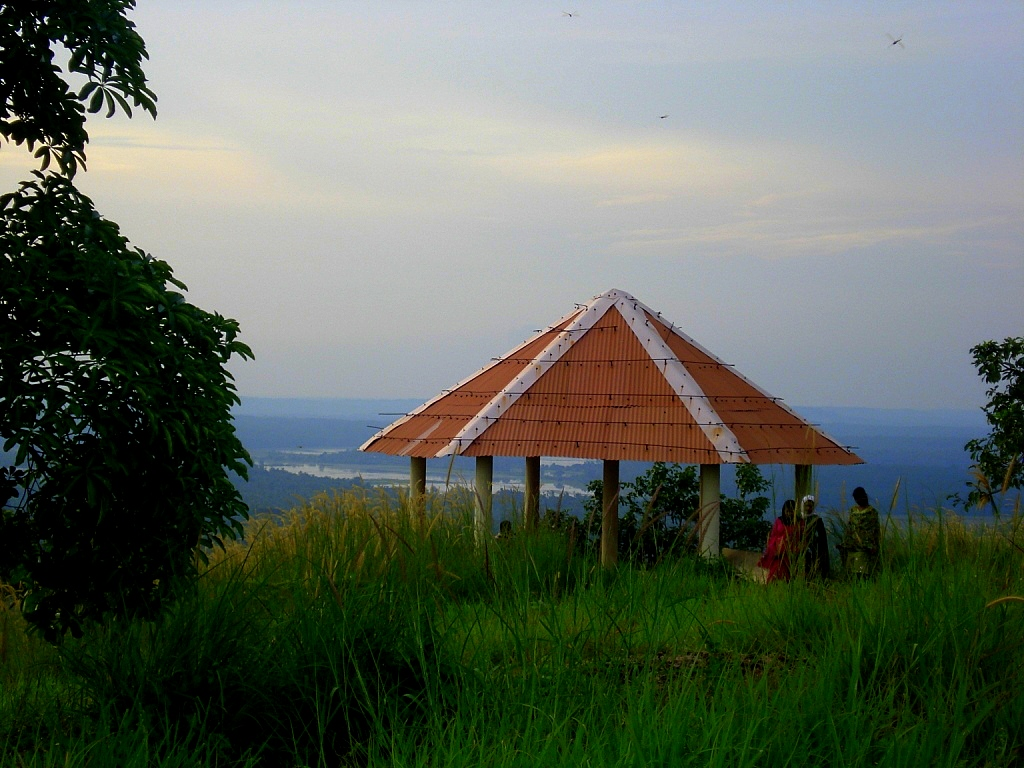
Vilangan Hills is the highest point in Thrissur City.

== Geography ==
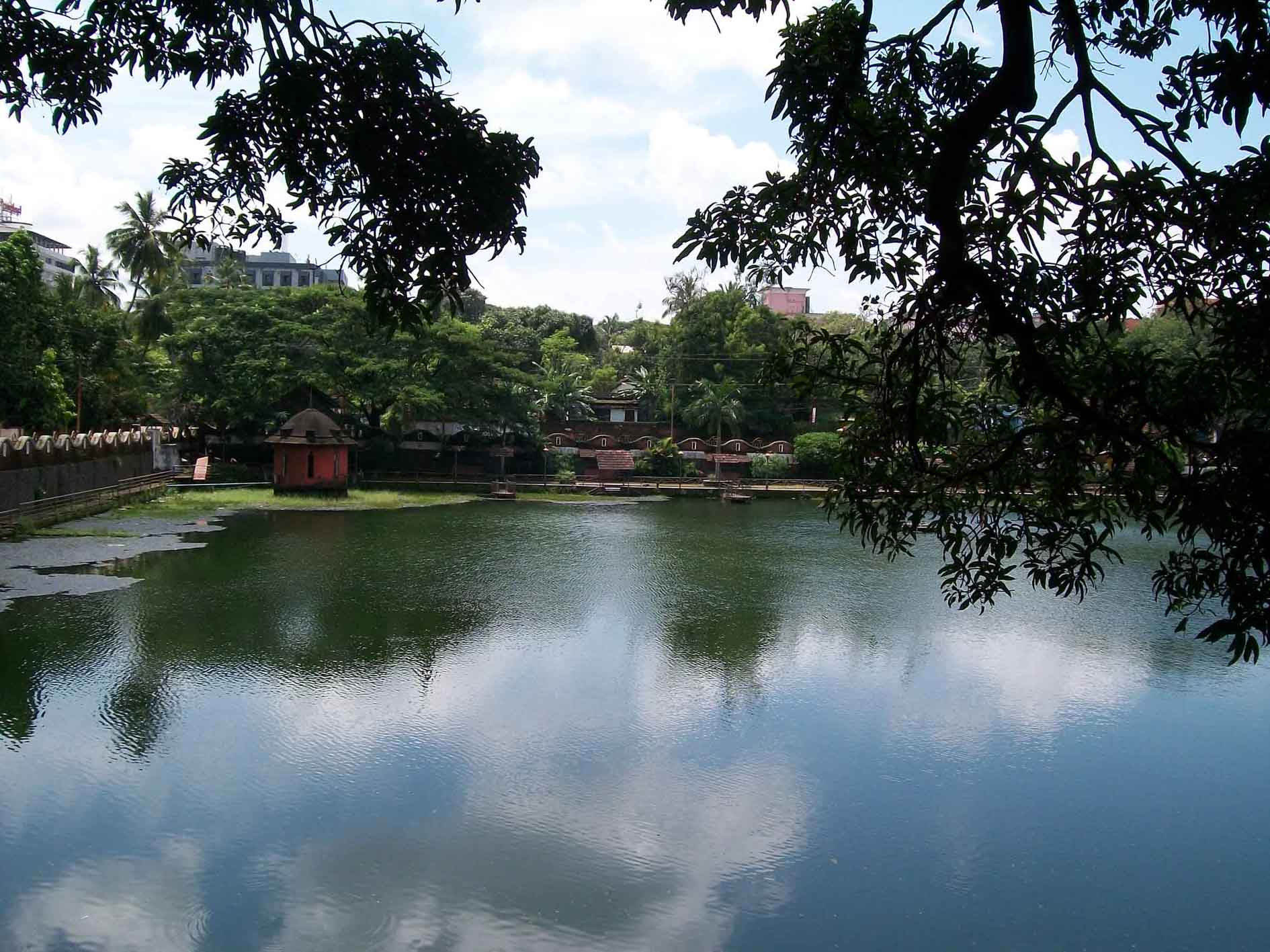
A view of Vadakkechira, Thrissur pond.

The city lies at 10.52°N 76.21°E and has an average altitude of 2.83 metres. The city is located in midland regions of Kerala, with an extended part of Palakkad plains. It is situated in hillock, which allows rain water to automatically drain out of the city. The city geologically is composed of Archaean gneisses and crystalline schists. Major parts of city are covered by Archaean rocks. Thrissur lies near the center of the Indian tectonic plate (the Indian Plate) and is subject to comparatively little seismic or volcanic activity. The predominant topography of the city is Thrissur Kole Wetlands which extends to Malappuram district. The city’s highest point is Vilangan Hills. The city is dotted with ponds and small rivers which act as a natural drainage system for the city. Peechi-Vazhani Wildlife Sanctuary in Western Ghats near Thrissur city act as a source of water for the city.

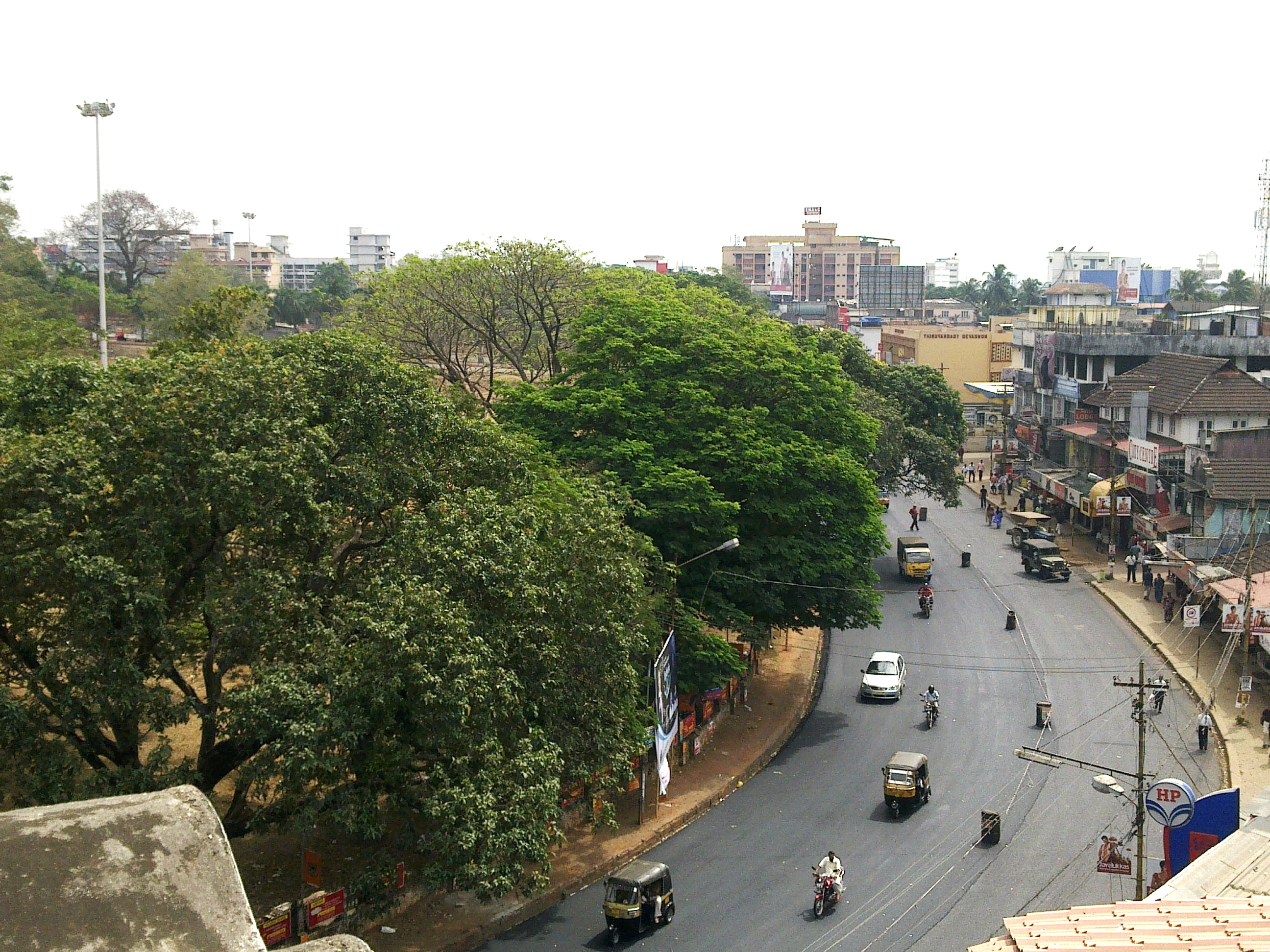
Thekkinkadu Maidan, a hillock in which Thrissur City is situated.

=== Climate ===
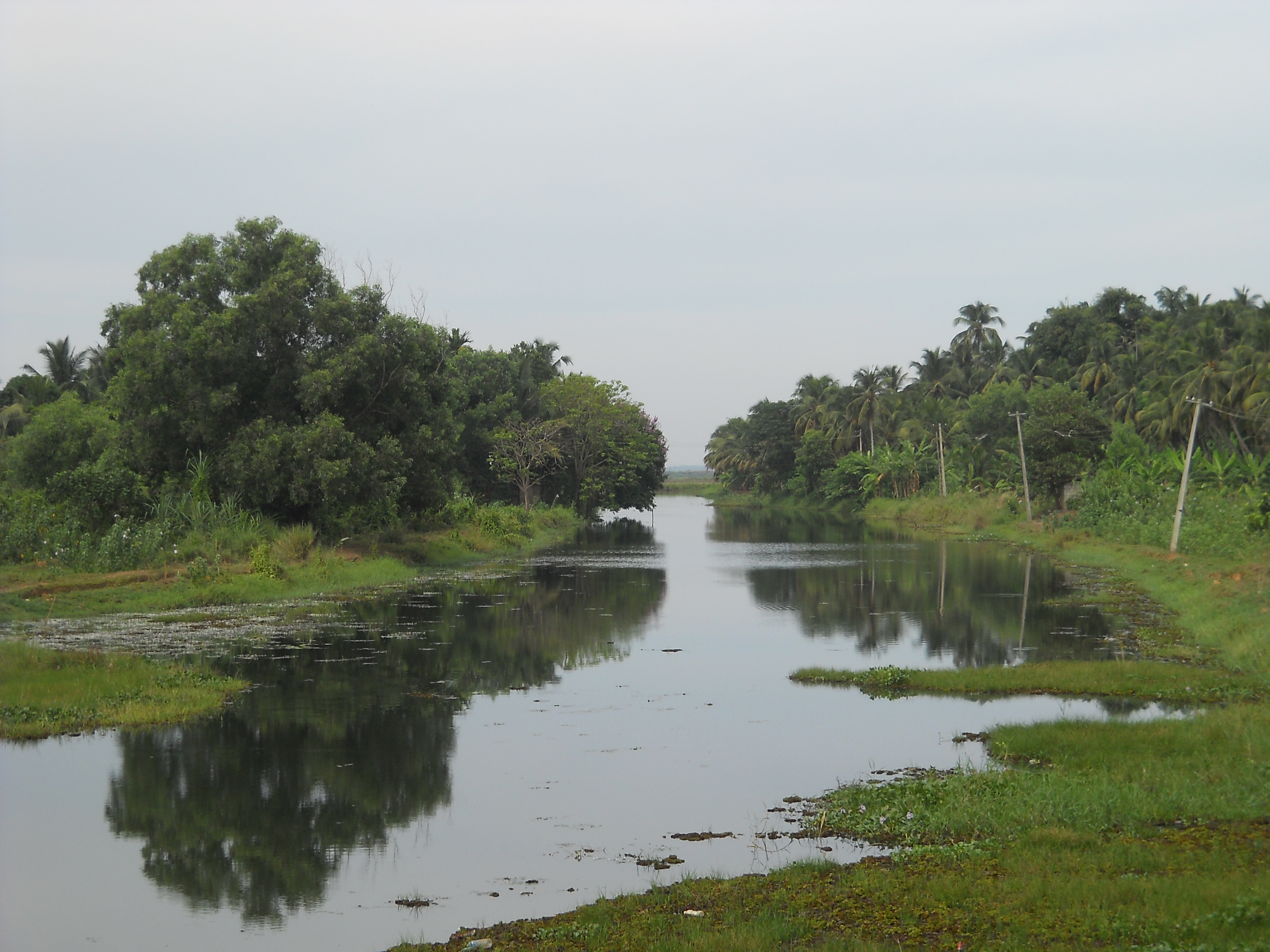
Puzhakkal river, one of the many rivers which go through the Kole Wetlands and provide water for rice cultivation and act as drainage system for Thrissur City.

Under the Köppen climate classification, the city features a Tropical monsoon climate. Since the region lies in the south western coastal state of Kerala, the climate is tropical, with only minor differences in temperatures between day and night, as well as over the year. Summer lasts from March to May, and is followed by the South-west monsoon from June to September. October and November form the post monsoon or retreating monsoon season. Winter from December through February is slightly cooler, and windy, due to winds from the Western Ghats. The City is drained in the monsoonal season by heavy showers. The average annual rainfall is 2500 mm. The South-west monsoon generally sets in during the last week of May. After July the rainfall decreases. On an average, there are 124 rainy days in a year. The maximum average temperature of the city in the summer season is 33 degree Celsius while the minimum temperature recorded is 22.5 degrees Celsius. The winter season records a maximum average of 29 degree Celsius and a minimum average of 20 degree Celsius.

Climate data for Thrissur
Month	Jan	Feb	Mar	Apr	May	Jun	Jul	Aug	Sep	Oct	Nov	Dec	Year
Mean daily maximum °C (°F)	33 (91)	34 (93)	36 (97)	36 (97)	38 (100)	33 (91)	33 (91)	33 (91)	33 (91)	33 (91)	34 (93)	35 (95)	34 (93)
Mean daily minimum °C (°F)	23 (73)	24 (75)	25 (77)	26 (79)	26 (79)	24 (75)	24 (75)	24 (75)	24 (75)	24 (75)	24 (75)	23 (73)	24 (76)
Average precipitation mm (inches)	32 (1.3)	26 (1.0)	39 (1.5)	147 (5.8)	391 (15.4)	576 (22.7)	391 (15.4)	367 (14.4)	417 (16.4)	467 (18.4)	223 (8.8)	47 (1.9)	3,123 (123)
Average precipitation days (≥ 0.1 mm)	3	3	5	13	17	26	28	24	18	23	13	4	177
Source: World Weather Online
