= Lakshmi Menon =

Lakshmi Menon may refer to:

- Lakshmi Menon (actress) (born 1996), Indian actress and dancer
- Lakshmi Menon (beauty queen), Indian model and actress
- Lakshmi Menon (model) (born 1981), Indian model
- Lakshmi N. Menon (1899–1994), Indian politician and writer
- Lakshmi U. Menon (born 1991), Malayalam television anchor and presenter
