= Mall of Joy =

Mall of Joy may refer to:

- Mall of Joy, Kottayam, a shopping mall located at Kottayam, Kerala
- Mall of Joy, Thrissur, a shopping mall located at Thrissur, Kerala
