= Ramavarma Appan Thampuran Memorial =

- Location: Ayyanthole, Thrissur city, Kerala, India
- Type: Memorial
- Beginning date: 1976

Ramavarma Appan Thampuran Memorial was established in 1976 at Ayyanthole, Thrissur city in Kerala in memory of Ramavarma Appan Thampuran for his literary and cultural contributions. The memorial was established under Kerala Sahitya Academy in Kumarapuram Palace where Ramavarma Appan Thampuran lived. The memorial contains a library which have a vast collection of famous books, journals, magazines, etc.

== Malayalam Library ==
The memorial library is the only one in Kerala where 7,160 bound volumes of magazines are available. The priceless collections include hundred years old Vidyavinodini (1065-1077), first volumes of Bhashaposhini (1069-1109), Sathyanada Kahalam, Rasikaranjini (1078- 1082) started by Appan Thampuran, Mangalodayam and Athmaposhini. It also contains memorabilia of Joseph Mundassery, Appan Thampuran, Kuttipuzha Krishna Pillai, Vilasini, Kainikkara Kumara Pillai, Puthencavu Mathan Tharakan and 250 other writers' original manuscripts are preserved in the memorial. A huge 3,000 different magazines from the beginning of Malayalam literature and a writer’s museum are parts of this memorial. It has five cottages, namely Kairali gramam each with a writing room, kitchen, veranda and a hall.
