= Gabriel Chiramel =

Indian priest

Fr. Gabriel Chiramel CMI
- Born: 11 December 1914; Manalur, Kingdom of Cochin
- Died: 11 May 2017 (aged 102); Thrissur, Kerala, India
- Occupations: Educationist, scholar, social reformer, priest
- Awards: Padma Bhushan
- Website: frgabriel.com

Fr. Gabriel Chiramel CMI (11 December 1914 – 11 May 2017) was an Indian Syro-Malabar Catholic priest, educationist, zoologist, author and social reformer, known for his services in the fields of education, health and human welfare. He was awarded Padma Bhushan in 2007 by the Government of India for his contribution to education and literature.

== Biography ==
Fr. Gabriel Chiramel CMI was born with the Christian name, Antony, on 11 December 1914 in Manalur in the south Indian state of Kerala. He made his first profession on 24 November 1933 and was ordained as a priest on 30 May 1942. He entered the field of teaching in the Upper Primary School in Champakkulam. In 1943 he moved to teach the Aspirants in Mannanam. After passing Intermediate with First Rank in St. Berchmans College, Changanassery and B.A Honours with 2nd Rank from Presidency College, Madras, he started teaching in Sacred Heart College, Thevara.

Chiramel served as the founder principal of Christ College in Irinjalakuda from 1956 to 1975. He built up the institution as a place of excellence with the integration of academics, literature, arts, sports and games. After his retirement from Christ College, he served as the provincial of Devamatha Province, Thrissur. It was during this time he initiated the establishment of Amala Cancer Hospital in 1978 which has now grown into Amala Institute of Medical Sciences, a Medical College offering the courses such as MBBS, MD, MS, DM, BSc Nursing, General Nursing, other paramedical courses, Diploma courses in pharmacy, nursing and therapy in Ayurveda. The institution aims at the integration of multiple systems of medicine viz., Modern Medicine, Ayurveda and Homeopathy on the same campus.

Chiramel was instrumental in establishing number of other institutions such as St. Joseph's College, Irinjalakuda, Carmel Higher Secondary School, Chalakudy, Bharathamatha School, Palakkad, Catholic Centre, Irinjalakuda, Deepthi Cultural Centre, Calicut, Sneha Bhavan for training physically challenged children and parallel colleges at Ambazhakad and Varantharapilly. He also established the Zoology Department of Sacred Heart College, Thevara.

Gabriel Chiramel died, at the age of 102, on 11 May 2017 at Amala Institute of Medical Sciences campus where he was staying towards the later part of his life.

== Scientific contribution ==
It was while teaching in Sacred Heart College, Thevara, in 1953, Chiramel discovered the wood boring mollusc that ate into ship platforms. It was later named Bankia Gabrieli after him.

== Legacy ==
Bankia Gabrieli and Stenaelurillus Gabrieli are both named after him.

== Institutions founded ==
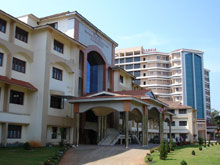
Amala Institute of Medical Sciences

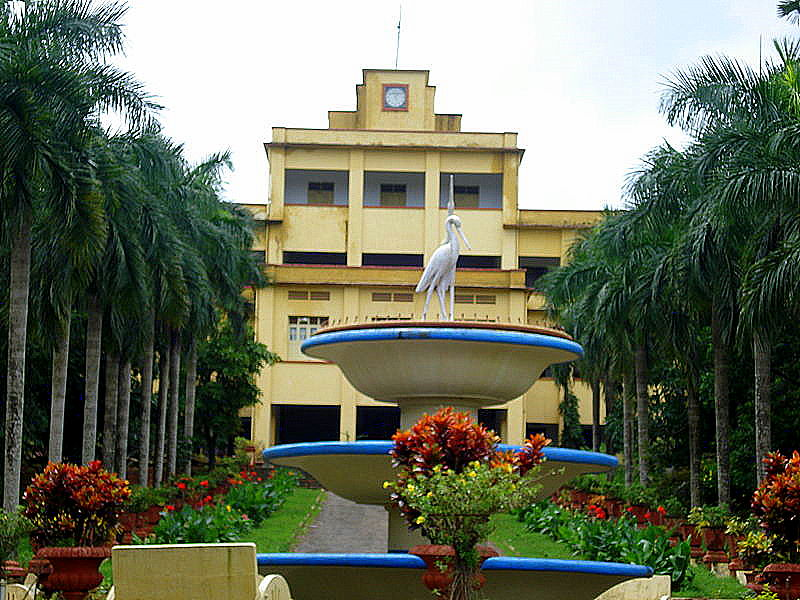
Christ College, Irinjalakuda

Fr Gabriel founded several institutions during his career.

- Zoology Department of Sacred Heart College, Thevara
- Amala Institute of Medical Sciences, Thrissur
- Christ College, Irinjalakuda
- St. Joseph's College, Irinjalakuda
- Carmel Higher Secondary School, Chalakudy
- Bharathamatha School, Palakkad
- Catholic Centre, Irinjalakuda
- Deepthi Cultural Centre, Calicut
- Sneha Bhavan for training physically challenged children

He also founded two parallel colleges at Ambazhakad and Varanthaarapilly.

== Awards ==
- Padma Bhushan Award by Government of India, 2006.
