= Christ College, Irinjalakuda =

College in Kerala, India

CHRIST College (Autonomous)
- Motto: "Jeevitha Prabha"
- Motto in English: "Light of Life"
- Type: Public
- Established: 1956; 70 years ago
- Founder: Carmelites of Mary Immaculate (CMI)
- Academic affiliations: University of Calicut
- Principal: Fr. (Dr.) Jolly Andrews, CMI
- Students: 5130+
- Location: Irinjalakuda, Thrissur District, Kerala, 680125, India; 10.3557°N 76.21226°E
- Campus: Urban
- Nickname: CCAIJK
- Website: christcollegeijk.edu.in

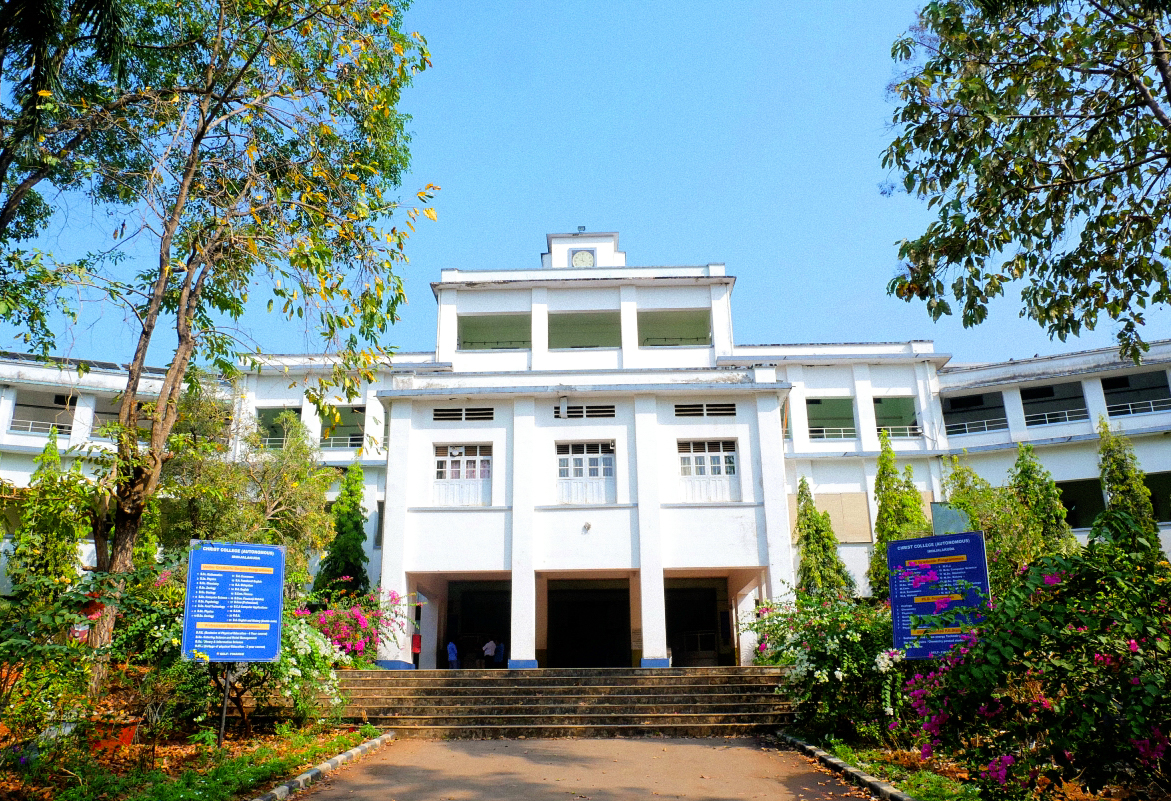
The portico of Christ College (Autonomous), Irinjalakuda

Christ College (Autonomous), Irinjalakuda, is a government-aided college located in Irinjalakuda, Thrissur, Kerala, India. It stands as a Syro-Malabar Catholic educational institution administered by the Carmelites of Mary Immaculate (CMI). Established in 1956 and affiliated with the University of Calicut, it holds the distinction of being the first college in Thrissur district to attain an 'A++' Grade certificate from the National Assessment and Accreditation Council (NAAC) in 2022.

The college was founded by the Devamatha Province of the Carmelites of Mary Immaculate (CMI), the institution traces its origins to Saint Kuriakose Elias Chavara, a religious priest who founded the indigenous congregation in 1831.

== History ==
Christ College was established in 1956 by Fr. Gabriel Chiramel CMI, a priest of Devamatha Province of the Carmelites of Mary Immaculate (CMI), an indigenous religious congregation founded in 1831 by St. Kuriakose Elias Chavara, a religious priest and versatile genius, who envisioned education as a tool for liberation and development. Christ College has its origin at Mangadikunnu, then a forlorn hill on the outskirts of Irinjalakuda Municipality. The college was inaugurated by Burgula Ramakrishna Rao, then Governor of Kerala on 13 October 1957. The college started with 240 students and 14 members on the teaching staff. The first Manager of the college was Rev. Fr. Clemens CMI and the first Principal was Rev. Fr. Gabriel Chiramel CMI. In the beginning, the college was affiliated to the University of Kerala until 1968, when it came under the jurisdiction of the University of Calicut.

== Academic departments ==
College has multiple departmnets catergorised into both aided and sel-financing streams offering various undergraduate (B.A., B.Sc., B.Com, BBA, BCA, B.Voc, B.P.Ed.), postgraduate (M.A., M.Sc., M.Com, MSW) and doctoral programs.

- Science: Botany, Chemistry, Computer Science, Food Technology, Geology & Environmental Science, Mathematics, Physics, Psychology, Statistics, Zoology
- Humanities and Social Sciences: Economics, English, History, Political Science, Social Work
- Commerce and Management: Commerce (offering specializations like Taxation and Logistics), Management Studies, Hotel Management and Catering

== Notable alumni ==
- Justice Harisankar V. Menon
- K. Satchidanandan
- P. Jayachandran
- K. Radhakrishnan
- P. N. Vinayachandran
- Kochouseph Chittilappilly
- Dr. V. P. Gangadharan
- Mala Aravindan
- Joju George
- Kamal (director)
- T. V. Chandran
- T. P. Senkumar
- M. P. Vincent
- Mani C. Kappan
- Edavela Babu
- Jiju Asokan
- Viswanathan Manikan
- Tom Emmatty
- P. Rajeeve
- C. R. Neelakandan
- Jijoy Rajagopal
- Aditi Ravi
- Sowmya Menon
- Lakshmi Nakshathra
- Malavika Menon

== Notable faculty ==
- K. Satchidanandan
- Fr. Gabriel Chiramel CMI
- Dr. A. V. George
- Syam Sudhakar

== In popular culture ==
Movies shot at Christ College, Irinjalakuda, include:

- Niram
- Puthiya Mugam
- Ishtam
- Vaadamalli
- Manathodu Mazhaikalam
- Pokkiri Raja
- Apoorvaragam
- Mazhavilkoodaram
- Dosth
- July 4
- D Company
- Mazhathullikkilukkam
- Twenty:20
- Kaaryasthan
- 2018

== See also ==
- Christ University
- University of Calicut
- St. Joseph's College, Irinjalakuda
- St. Thomas College, Thrissur
- Vimala College
