= K. V. Jayakumar =

Indian judge

The Honourable Justice K. V. Jayakumar

Judge of the Kerala High Court
- Incumbent
- Assumed office 30 October 2024
- Nominated by: D. Y. Chandrachud
- Appointed by: Droupadi Murmu

Personal details
- Pronunciation: K. V. Jayakumar കെ. വി. ജയകുമാർ
- Born: 21 May 1973 (age 53) Chalakkudy Thrissur district Kerala
- Education: Government Law College, Thrissur
- Website: High Court of Kerala

Kodassery Veliyath Madom Jayakumar is an Indian judge who is presently serving as a judge of Kerala High Court. The High Court of Kerala is the highest court in the Indian state of Kerala and in the Union Territory of Lakshadweep. The High Court of Kerala is headquartered at Ernakulam, Kochi.

== Early life and education ==
Jayakumar completed his schooling from Mar Augustine Memorial Higher Secondary School, Koratty, graduation from Panampilly Memorial Government College, Chalakkudy and obtained Law Degree from Government Law College, Thrissur.

== Career ==
Jayakumar enrolled as an advocate and started practice at Thrissur mainly in civil and insurance matters. He was directly recruited from bar as district and sessions judge in 2012. Served as Additional district and sessions judge, Thalassery and Palakkad, Enquiry Commissioner and Special Judge (Vigilance), Kozhikode, District & Sessions Judge, Thalassery and Kollam and Registrar (Vigilance), High Court of Kerala. He was elevated as additional judge of High Court of Kerala on 30 October 2024 and became permanent judge from 5 October 2026.
