= A. V. George =

Indian scientist

Dr. A.V. George
- Vice Chancellor, Mahatma Gandhi University, Kottayam, Kerala
- Website: Mgu.ac.in

Dr. Aikara Varkey George (born 1956) is an environmental scientist, teacher and social activist from India.

He was Vice Chancellor of Mahatma Gandhi University until he was dismissed by Kerala Governor Sheila Dikshit on 12 May 2014 due to ineligibility.

== Biography ==
A. V. George was born in 1956 in Thidnadu near Pala in Kerala, as the son of A. U. Varkey of the Aikara House.

He did his undergraduate work in Geology at University College Trivandrum and PG and Phd from the University of Kerala. Later he took an MSc in Environmental Sciences from Sikkim Manipal University of Medical Science and Technology. He also took a diploma in Environmental Management. He began teaching in 1987 and has offered courses on Disaster Management, Hydrogeology, Structural Geology and Geophysics. He served in the faculties of Christ College, Irinjalakuda, the School of Environmental Sciences of MG University and Cochin University of Science and Technology.

He was Head of the Department of Environmental Science, at Central University of Kerala. In 2014, he was dismissed from the post of Vice Chancellor of Mahatma Gandhi University.He also worked as a professor at the Adama Science and Technology University,Ethiopia

== Research and publications ==
George's principal areas of research are geological environmental appraisal, particularly regarding landslides, disaster management and hydrology.

He has been involved in drafting development schemes, extension work, community services, etc., undertaken by universities, colleges, Rotary Clubs, Municipal Corporations etc. and established numerous ‘botanical gardens’ under various government organizations and NGOs in Kerala. He is also a member in Disaster Management Committees of government and non-government organizations.

George is a Fellow and Life member of the Geological Society of India, the Mineralogical Society of India, the Indian Society of Remote Sensing, the Tropical Institute of Ecological Sciences and the Indian Science Congress. He has acted as a member of the River Sand Committee of the Govt of Kerala's Committee on the Mullaperiyar Dam Issue.

== Awards and recognition ==
George has received Awards for Best Teachers BOLT (Broad Outlook Learner Teacher) Award of Air India, Prof. M M Gani Award, St Bergman's’ Award etc. constituted by universities and Government.
