= Syam Sudhakar =

Indian poet

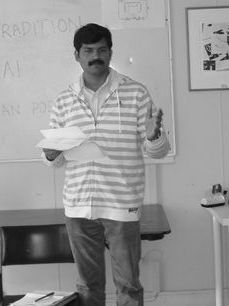
- Born: 16 October 1983 (age 42); Vadanamkurussi, Palakkad District, Kerala, India
- Writing career
- Genres: Poetry, Criticism

Syam Sudhakar (born 16 October 1983) is a bilingual poet and academic from Kerala, India. He writes poems in Malayalam, his native language, and in English. His poems have been translated into several languages including Tamil, Hindi, Bengali, Manipuri, French and Chinese. His debut collection in Malayalam Earpam (Damp, 2001) and the English collection Drenched by the Sun (2013) are the most prominent works of his poetic career. He has also published a number of poems and articles in leading magazines and journals both home and abroad.

== Life and career ==
Syam Sudhakar was born in 1983 in Vadanamkurissi, a village in Palakkad District, Kerala. After his early education at K.V.R.H.S and G.H.S.S Vadanamkurissi, he completed his graduation in English and History from St. Thomas College, Thrissur. He pursued his Masters in English Literature from the University of Madras, M. Phil with a specialization on Dravidian Aesthetics from Presidency College, Chennai and Ph.D in Beat Generation Literature from the University of Madras.

He is also one of the founder members of Centre for Performance Research and Cultural Studies in South Asia and the Poetry Advisor of Sydney School of Arts and Humanities. Sudhakar was associated with a research project on Gender Studies in IIT Madras and worked at Christ College, Irinjalakuda and VIT, Chennai before he began his teaching career at St. Thomas College, Thrissur.

== Criticism ==
The sound patterns on which Malayalam poetry functions is moulded to perfection in the poetry of Syam Sudhakar. Being a member of the younger generation, the visual media culture that defines this generation has left a mark on him, which in turn is reflected in his poetry. Other than the presence of rich visual imagery, Sudhakar's primary forte is his use of the technique of magic realism which till date has been hardly used by Indian poets so extensively. The rich heritage of Indian myth, folklore and superstitions had been a part of Sudhakar’s growing up years; it is this heritage that Sudhakar tries to express through his poems, as he says, “My home was surrounded with fields shining in the blazing sun. I have grown up with ghost stories and colourful folk tales. All of them find a space in my work, which is my way of connecting with my roots”. Critic Anamika Chakraborty points out that "regional presence is one of the key components of the concept of magical realism, because the magical is inherent in the diverse ethnic culture, history and tradition, flora and fauna in Sudhakar’s native Kerala. Through the use of magical realism Sudhakar can easily convince the dubious reader about the reality of the supernatural. So the reader is convinced that ‘stepping stones’ can be made of ‘cheese-cakes’ and the ‘sinking boatman plucks a rainbow and it turns into a boat’".

K. Satchidanandan notes that his poems revel in linguistic play and thus interiorize the ontological essence of poetry. He points out that it is difficult to narrow in on a particular theme or story in his poems. Sudhakar finds inspiration in the natural landscape which he celebrates in his one-of-a-kind imagery which can be seen as a hall mark of his poetry. He is known for his use of images that are at once real and magical and often have a dream- like quality, with layers of meanings. One can comfortably and consciously claim that along with his use of myth and legend, Sudhakar’s verses are technically sound and resonate with a wide range of themes. The major themes of Sudhakar’s poems are that of time and death and love; for Sudhakar time is cyclical rather than linear. One can see that Sudhakar is quite meticulous in portraying death; with a nonchalance that can only be attributed to the ever-prevalent sense of disillusionment infused in the postmodern mind. Razeena P R remarks, "by associating death with the course of nature; sunrise and sunset, waves on the shore, and meteors, Sudhakar has conveyed a sense of the inescapability and inevitability of death". It is his preoccupation with death, dying and afterlife which binds his poems together. Sudhakar remarks that "Every good poem is a drop from a star which always twinkles in your heart. It makes you feel as if you are in love, it makes your eyes wet, throat choke".

Sudhakar occasionally delves in a subtle form of commentary on the socio-political scenario. His poems are intensely personal on one hand and political on the other; despite the theme, the poems are loaded with metaphors, images, allegories and dream sequences. Most often in Sudhakar’s poems, the self is disillusioned, lonely and fragmented in faith and vision. According to Mandika Sinha, "in his poems, sometimes he is a silent observer, sometimes he is a subjective narrator and together he recreates a world with sensitivity and subtle humour where death is an everyday reality". Sudhakar deals with a wide gamut of subjects and the poems in this collection are a mine of rich poetry. Sudhakar’s poems employ deliberate indifference to deflate a highly emotional situation, especially by transferring a human tragedy to the animal world in the form of postmodern parody. K. Satchidanandan observes that "Syam's world constantly de-familiarizes the familiar" and adds that "Syam is seldom philosophical, but this poem ('Happiness and Sorrow : A Crisis'), like some others, does reveal a philosophical inclination".

== Awards and achievements ==
One of Syam Sudhakar's early recognitions in poetry is Nandita Poetry Award, which he received in the year 2002. He won the Vallatol Poetry Prize for poetry, conducted by Kerala Kalamandalam, Cheruthurithi, Kerala, for the year 2007–2008. He was awarded the Madras Kerala Samajam Poetry Award by Madras Kerala Samajam, Chennai in 2008. On invitation, Sudhakar has also delivered poetry readings and lectures in Brisbane and Sydney in 2009 and 2013. Syam Sudhakar is also the winner of the 14th Srinivas Rayaprol Poetry Prize 2022, instituted by the Hyderabad-based Srinivas Rayaprol Literary Trust to recognize excellence in poetry written in English by poets in the age group of 20-40 years. The Prize is jointly administered by the Department of English, University of Hyderabad.

== Works ==
- Earpam (Damp, 2001)
- Syam Sudhakar Kavithaikal (Poems of Syam Sudhakar, Trans. Yuma Vasuki 2008)
- Drenched by the Sun (2013)
- Slicing the Moon: A Screen book of Poems (A video rendering of poems, 2013)
- Avasanathe Kollimeen (The Last Meteor, 2014)
- Kadalinte Kaavalkkaran (DC Books, 2025)
