= Sekar Ayyanthole =

Indian artist (born 1954)

- Born: 1954; Ayyanthole (Thrissur), Kerala, India
- Died: February 7, 2026; Edappal
- Occupation: Painter
- Website: www.ayyanthole.com

Sekar Ayyanthole (1954 – 7 February 2026) was a painter, art teacher, and former president of Kerala Chithrakala Parishath.

== Birth ==
Ayyanthole was born in Ayyanthole, Thrissur, Kerala, South India in 1954.

== Education ==
He earned a diploma in drawing and painting GOI (Government Occupational Institute - now College of Fine Arts, Thrissur in 1975.

== Employment ==
Ayyanthole worked in the Government Occupational Institute, Thrissur as an Art Instructor for less than a year in 1976. From 1978 to 2006, he worked in Kerala Government Education Department as an art teacher.

== Awards ==
Year	Institution	Article	Award	Source
1978	KLK Academy	"Anakkara"	Honorable mention	
1982	Kerala Chithrakala Parishath	“Omana”	Cash award	
1983	Kerala Chithrakala Parishath	"Omana-9"	KCP Award	
1984	KLK Academy	"Golden Temple"	Honorable mention	
1989	PG Samskrithi Kendram	“Bull Festival”	National Award	
2014	Kerala Lalithakala Akademi	-	Honorable mention	

== Family ==
Ayyanthole's wife is Omana C K. He has two sons, Jinan Sekhar and Dhanan Sekhar Edathara.
