= Carmel Higher Secondary School, Chalakudy =

Location
- Chalakudy, Kerala; India; 10.304°N 76.329°E

Information
- Motto: Let there be life in abundance
- School district: Thrissur
- Website: www.carmelchalakudy.com

Carmel Higher Secondary School is an institution established and managed by Carmelites of Mary Immaculate (CMI) fathers. It is situated in Chalakudy, near the Chalakudy railway station in India. The school has a history of near to 40 years. It was the first English medium school in Chalakudy.

== School history ==
Carmel Higher Secondary School was established by the Carmelites of Mary Immaculate Congregation of Devamatha Province, Thrissur on 16 July 1975. The school founded by Rev. Fr. Gabriel, the Provincial of Devamatha Province. It is recognized by the Government of Kerala and the medium of instruction is English.

== Current school events ==
The present head of the institution is Rev. Fr. Jose Thanickal. The school has 2082 pupils. Carmel does charity work for poor students in Chalakudy. Carmel is known for its academic and co curricular excellence all over Kerala.

== Notable alumni ==
- Lijo Jose Pellissery, Director, Actor, Script Writer - Malayalam film industry
