= Harisankar V. Menon =

The Honourable Justice Harisankar V. Menon

Judge of the Kerala High Court
- Incumbent
- Assumed office 22 March 2024
- Nominated by: D. Y. Chandrachud
- Appointed by: Droupadi Murmu

Personal details
- Born: 4 April 1974 (age 52) Thiruvananthapuram, Kerala
- Spouse: Meera V. Menon
- Education: Government Law College, Ernakulam; Christ College, Irinjalakuda
- Website: High Court of Kerala

Harisankar Vijayan Menon is an Indian judge serving as a judge of Kerala High Court, the highest court in the Indian state of Kerala and in the Union Territory of Lakshadweep.. Menon was elevated as judge from the bar while he was practicing as a lawyer in Kerala High Court.

== Early life and education ==
Justice Menon was born in Thriruvananthapuram, Kerala, completed his schooling from Mar Augustine Memorial Higher Secondary School, Koratty and Christ College, Irinjalakuda, graduated in law from Government Law College, Ernakulam.

== Career ==
After completing law Justice Menon enrolled as an advocate in Bar Council of Kerala in 1997 and started his practice. Taxation (Direct and Indirect) was his main area of practice. On 22 March 2024, he was appointed as an additional judge of Kerala High Court and became permanent judge with effect from 4 March 2026.
