= N. R. Anil Kumar =

Indian chess player (born 1957)

Personal information
- Born: 30 May 1957 (age 69) Ayyanthole, Thrissur, Kerala, India

Chess career
- Country: India
- Title: ICCF Senior International Master (2002)
- FIDE rating: 2306 (November 2018)
- Peak rating: 2340 (July 1997)
- ICCF rating: 1959 (October 2004)
- ICCF peak rating: 2499 (April 2002)

N. R. Anil Kumar (born 30 May 1957), also known as N. R. Anilkumar, is an Indian chess player who participated in the 25th Chess Olympiad in 1982. He is the first Indian chess player to achieve the International Master title from the International Correspondence Chess Federation.

== Career ==
Anilkumar learned chess at a relatively late age of 15 in 1972 and soon developed into a strong chess player. He won the Kerala State Junior title in 1977 and became Kerala Senior Champion 1979. Anilkumar made history by becoming the first player from Kerala to qualify for the National A Chess Championship in 1981. In the National A Championship at Kanpur in 1981, Anilkumar was placed 4th and thus became the first Keralite to secure a place in the Indian team. He represented the Indian men's team in the World Chess Olympiad in Lucerne Switzerland in 1982. Anilkumar's other achievements include 3rd place in International Tournaments Colombo 1982 & 2006, 3rd place International Tournament Singapore 1985, Board Prize in Asian Cities Invitation Championship Kuala Lumpur Malaysia 1990, 6th in International Tournament St Denis Reunion Island, 5th in Chess Train International Tournament Prague. Anilkumar is also the only Kerala player to have won the National B Chess Championship (1988 Kozhikode). In 2003, Anilkumar turned to correspondence chess and won the All India Correspondence Championship twice. He created history by becoming the first Indian player to win the International Master and Senior International Master titles in correspondence chess awarded by the International Correspondence Chess Federation (2003 Rimini Italy, 2004 Seixal Portugal). Anilkumar is also the only player from Kerala to be awarded the FIDE Trainer title by the World Chess Federation (FIDE).

He started the first private chess academy in Kerala in 1993, Kasparov Chess Academy in Thrissur. Anilkumar's contributions have also come as a chess organizer. He organized the first ever Rapid Chess Tournament in Thrissur in 1986 in which 5 IMs participated. He was instrumental in organizing a record participation one day tournament in Thrissur in 2017 in which over 840 players participated. The NC Chummar Fide Rated events of which he was the main organizer set a new trend by charging the players a very low entry fees. Anilkumar initiated the organizing of the first ever chess tourism event in India, Chess Houseboat 2020. He is the President of Chess Kerala and a founder member of Chess Players Forum. Anil Kumar is an English professor and was the head of the department. English in Sree Kerala Varma College, Thrissur. He is also an author about Chess game and published നിങ്ങൾക്കുമാകാം ചെസ്സ്‌ ചാമ്പ്യൻ, a book for chess training course in Malayalam. The book was published by D.C. Books. He is also a Columnist of Mathrubhumi daily for their Youth column.

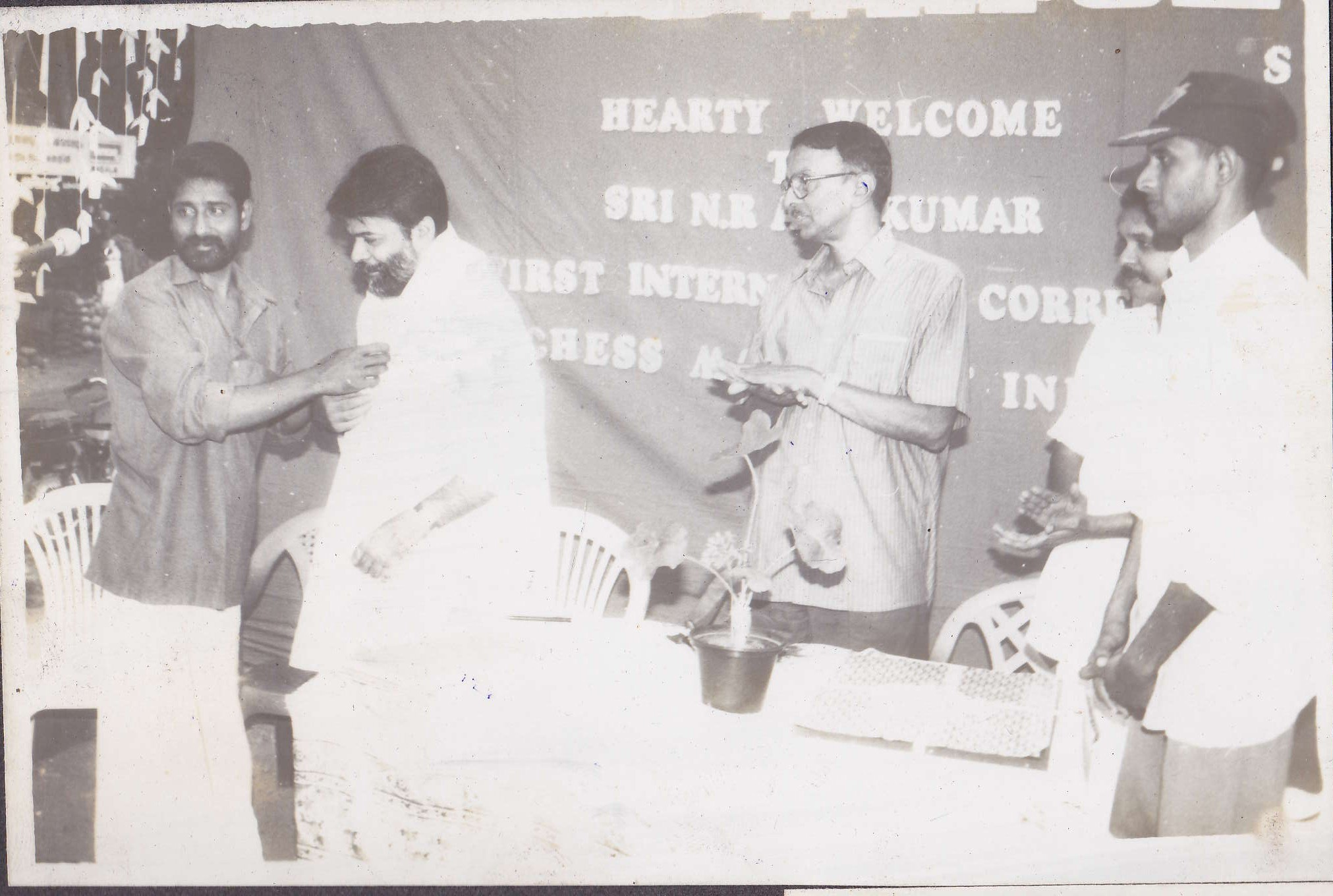
Sathish Kalathil, Red Star Club president, Sankarayya Road, Thrissur arrays Shawl to N. R. Anilkumar for the achievement of International Correspondence Chess Master on 12 November 2000.
