= Mall of Joy, Thrissur =

Shopping mall in Thrissur, Kerala, India

Mall of Joy
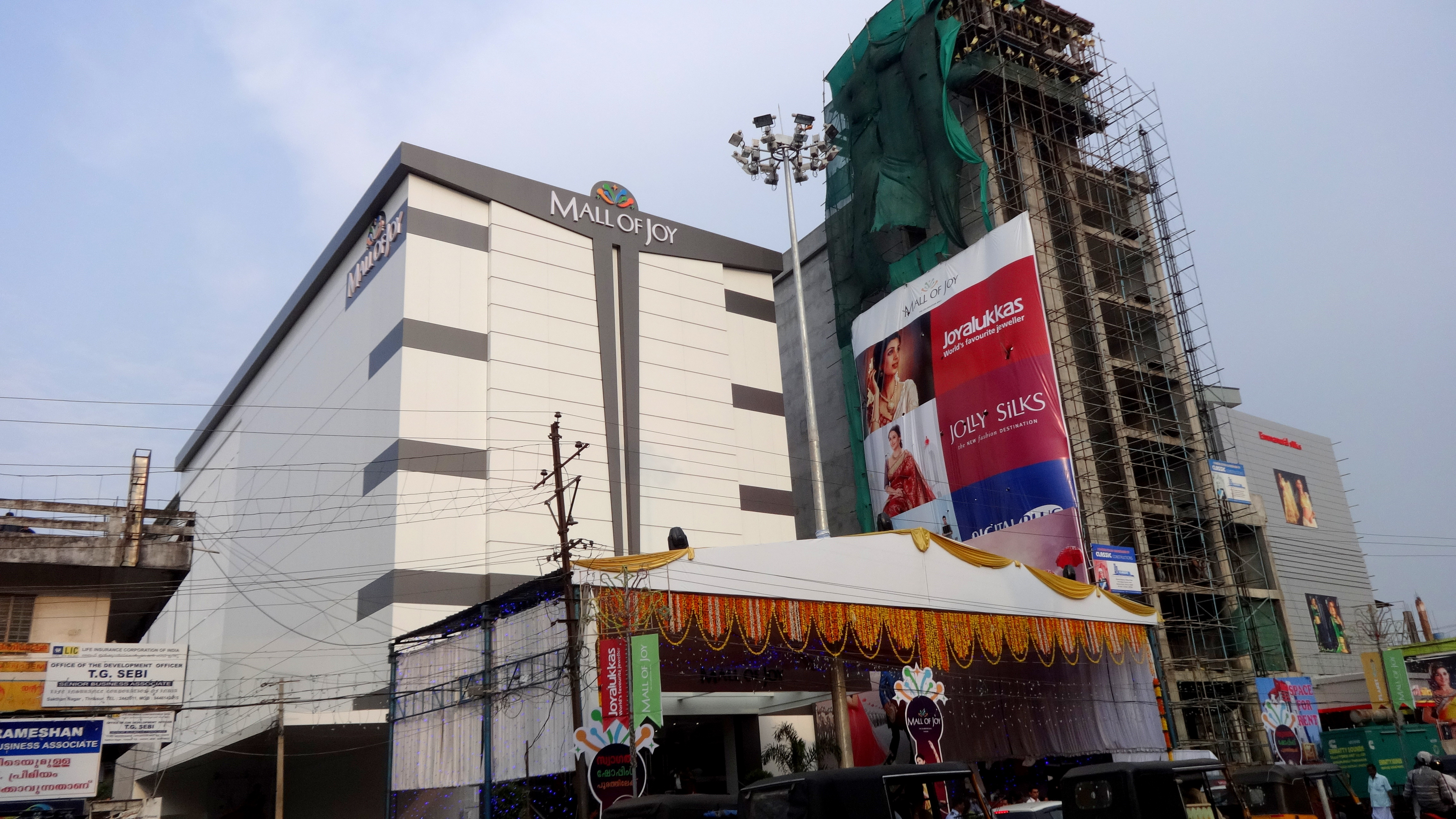
- Location: Thrissur, Kerala, India
- Address: Sakthan Thampuran Nagar, Thrissur
- Opened: 5 April 2014
- Floor area: 200,000 square feet (19,000 m^{2})
- Floors: 4
- Website: www.mallofjoy.com/index.html

Mall of Joy was a shopping mall located in Thrissur, Kerala, India. The mall had a retail floor space of 200,000 sq ft (19,000 m^{2}). It was the first of eight malls proposed by Joy Alukkas Group, with the one at Kottayam being second to start functioning.

== See also ==
- Sobha City Mall
