= Lulu Convention Centre =

Coordinates: 10.5413031°N 76.1822796°E

Lulu International Convention Centre
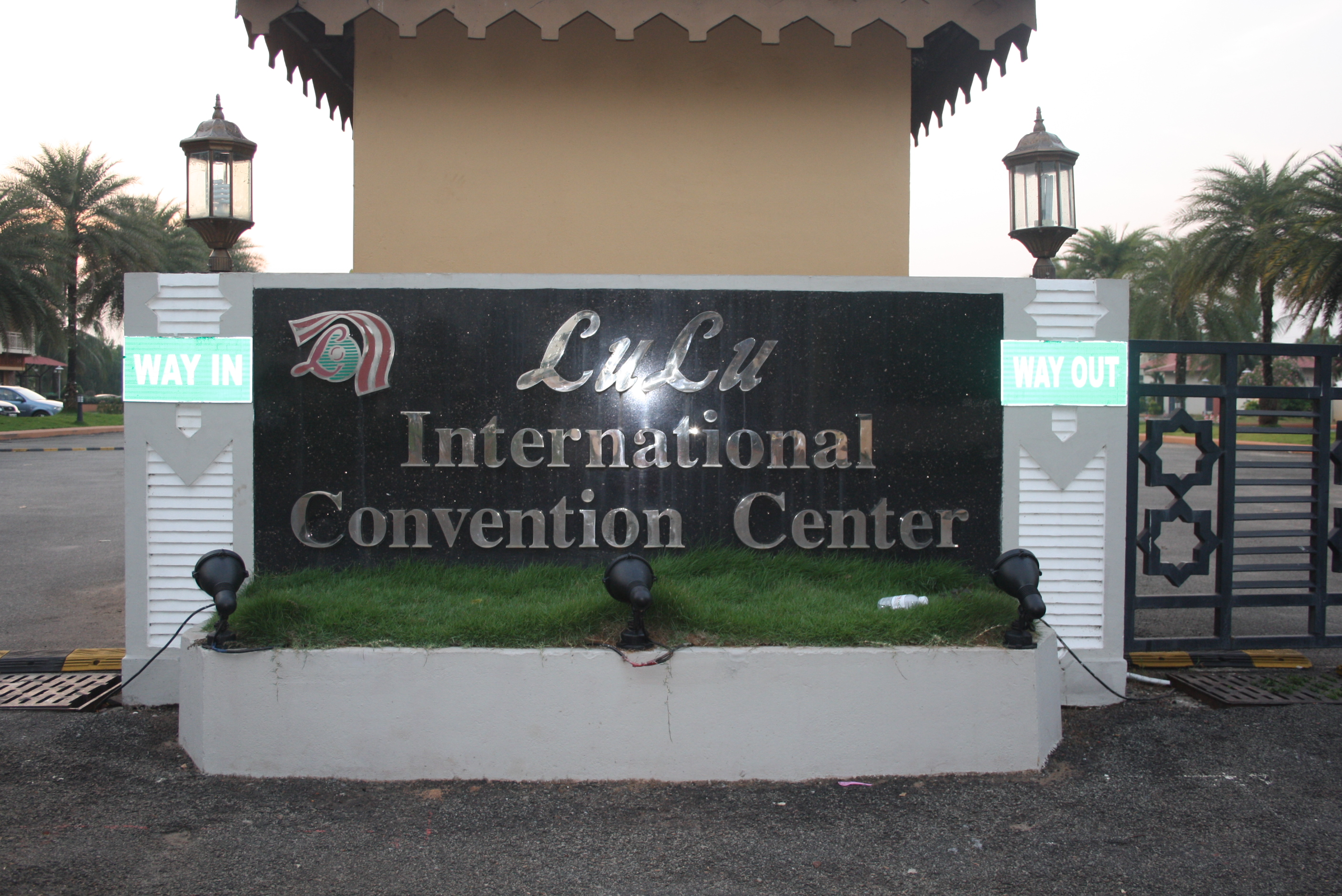
- Interactive map of the Lulu International Convention Centre area

General information
- Type: Auditorium
- Architectural style: Ethnic
- Location: Thrissur, Kerala, India
- Opened: 2006; 20 years ago
- Owner: Lulu Group International

Design and construction
- Architect: Evolution Interior Architecture
- Main contractor: EMKE Group of Industries

Website
- www.hyatt.com/hyatt-regency/en-US/cokrt-hyatt-regency-thrissur/meetings

The Lulu International Convention Centre is located at Puzhakkal, in Thrissur city of Kerala state. The property is owned and managed by Yusuff Ali M.A. Chairman and managing director of Lulu Group International, which has extensive business in retail, hospitality, real estate etc. The 5,000-seat convention centre was built by EMKE Group of Industries. Some of the interior architecture was by Evolution Interior Architecture. The convention centre is spread across an area of 18 acres (73,000 m^{2}) with a built-up area of 160,000 square feet (15,000 m^{2}) and has been divided into both indoor hall and open-air auditorium, with dining facility for 2,000 guests at a time. The convention center has 5 venues for conferences, which can accommodate from 450 to 2,200 people. A 5-star Hotel (the Hyatt Regency Thrissur) is also present on the site. It features an amazing parking for 1800 cars and also has an exclusive Helipad.
