= Government Law College, Thrissur =

Indian college

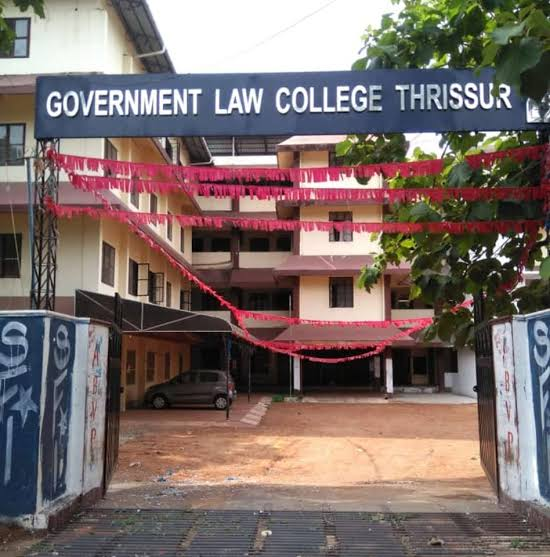
- Other name: GLCT
- Motto: Fiat justitia ruat caelum
- Motto in English: Let justice be done though the heavens fall
- Type: Government
- Established: 1992; 34 years ago
- Affiliations: Bar Council of India, New Delhi (BCI); University of Calicut
- Principal: Dr. Sonia K Das
- Students: 900
- Undergraduates: 880
- Postgraduates: 20
- Location: Thrissur, Kerala, Ayyanthole P.O, 680003, India; 10.5293°N 76.1878°E
- Campus: Urban
- Language: English
- Website: www.glcthrissur.com

Government Law College Thrissur, also known as Thrissur Law College, is situated in Ayyanthole. It is the fourth Government law college in Kerala and is owned by the Government of Kerala and affiliated to University of Calicut. The college caters to the needs of Thrissur District, Palakkad District and Malappuram District of Kerala. The College was started in the year 1992. Approved by Bar Council of India (BCI), New Delhi, the college offers three-year undergraduate and five-year integrated programs in the field of law and postgraduate degree also. The first batch of Law Graduates came out in 1993–94 academic year.

== Campus ==
Government Law College, Thrissur is in Ayyanthole, near the District Court at Thrissur. The college campus includes:

- Library
- Academic centers
- Auditorium
- College canteen
- Badminton Court
- Ground
- Cyber station

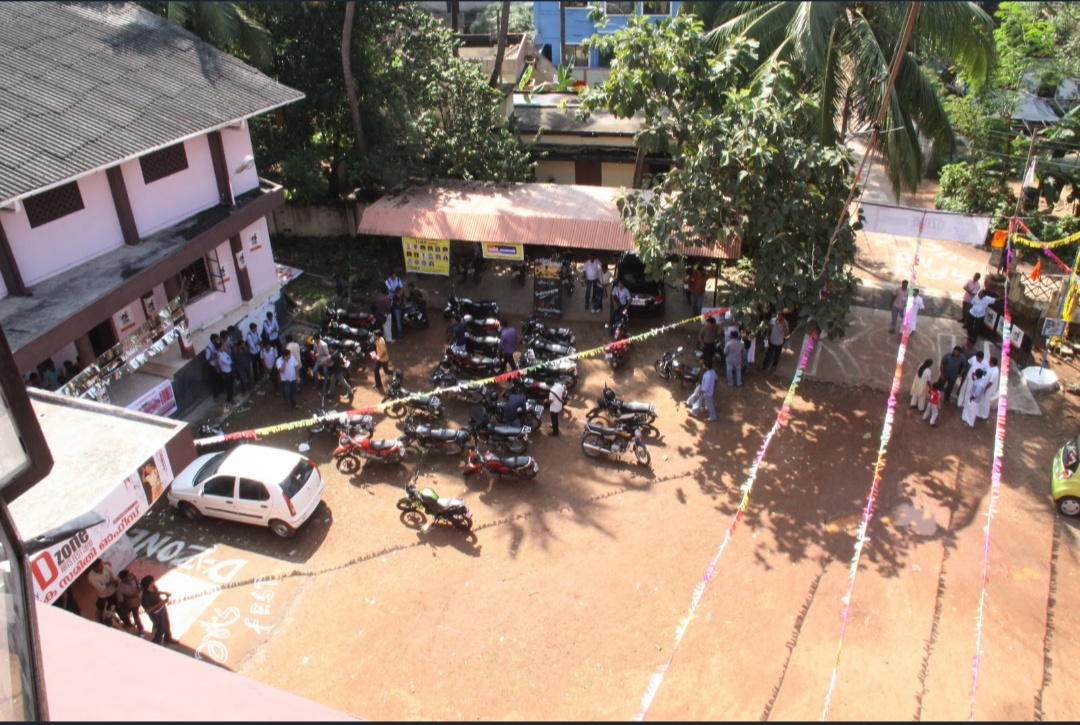
Calicut University D-Zone Art fest held at Government Law college campus in 2010-11

== Academic Centres ==
The college has four academic centres established with the aim to advance the academic aspirations of the students and orient them towards active and creative engage with the society. The four centres carry out multitude of activities throughout the year. National and international conferences, seminars, panel discussions, workshops, expert presentations, special lectures, internships, training programmes are some of them.

- The Centre for Economy, Development and Law (CED&L) is an interdisciplinary centre creating a platform for informed discussions on various socio-political and legal issues. CED&L is publishing a peer-reviewed bi-annual journal titled Elenchus Law Review.
- The ADR (Alternative Dispute Resolution) Centre is focused on conducting adalats, facilitating the legal process outside courts and also enhancing professional skills of the law students.
- Centre for Business Laws (CBL) and
- A. T. Markose Chair on Advanced Legal Studies (ATMC)also organise activities that together contribute largely to the vibrancy of the campus.

== Course offered ==
The college provides instructions to candidates preparing for the LL.B degree examinations (3 year and 5 year). The course of study and syllabi is in accordance with that laid down by the University of Calicut.

=== UG ===
- 3-year LL.B (Bachelor of Laws) course is divided into 6 semesters which is a unitary degree course.
- 5-year course is divided into 10 semesters which is an integrated dual degree course of B.B.A, LL.B

=== PG ===
- LL.M. (Master of Laws) Degree of the University of Calicut in specialisation of Administrative Law and Criminal law. The course of study and syllabi are in accordance with those laid down by the university of calicut.

== Notable alumni ==
- Justice K. V. Jayakumar, Judge, High Court of Kerala
- O. J. Janeesh, Minister for Youth Welfare, Sports, Registration and Archeology, Zoo and Museum, Government of Kerala
- V. T. Balram, Politician, Lawyer, Member of the Kerala Legislative Assembly
- Fathima Thahiliya, Member of the Kerala Legislative Assembly
- C. V. Santhakumar, Member of the Kerala Legislative Assembly
- Adv. Tony Emmatty, National Panel Cricket Umpire - Board of Control for Cricket in India
- Comdt. Indu P. Nair, Regional Law Officer, Indian Coast Guard
- M. S. Gopakumar, Chief Fair Play Officer for the FIDE World Cup 2025 and former Indian Air Force chess coach
