= Amala Institute of Medical Sciences =

Coordinates: 10.561356°N 76.167271°E

Amala Institute of Medical sciences
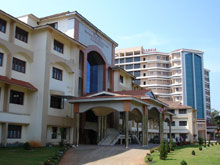

Geography
- Location: Thrissur, Kerala, India

Organisation
- Funding: Non-profit hospital

Services
- Emergency department: Yes

History
- Opened: 1978

Links
- Website: www.amalaims.org

Amala Institute of Medical Sciences is a private medical college near Amalanagar, in Thrissur city, of Kerala state. It is a Christian minority institution established and administered by the Devamatha Province of the Carmelites of Mary Immaculate (CMI), an indigenous religious congregation founded in 1831.

== History ==
Amala was established in 1978 as a nonprofit, charitable institution aimed at treatment and management of Cancer in Thrissur. The institution was formally inaugurated on 25 April 1978 by the then President of India, Neelam Sanjiva Reddy. The hospital complex was situated on the slopes of the Vilangan Hills, spreading over a 40-acre (160,000 m^{2}) campus.

== See also ==
- Azeezia Medical College
