= Lakshmi Nakshathra =

Indian television host

- Born: Lakshmi Unnikrishnan K 2 September 1991 (age 35); Koorkenchery, Thrissur, Kerala, India
- Other name: Chinnu
- Education: Christ College, Irinjalakuda; Elijah Institute of Management Studies, Thrissur
- Occupations: TV Host; Radio Jockey
- Years active: 2007 – present
- Spouse: Rimshad (m. 2017, divorced)

Lakshmi Unnikrishnan K (born 2 September 1991), better known by her stage name Lakshmi Nakshathra, is an Indian television presenter and radio jockey who works in Malayalam television and stage shows. She is best known for hosting Star Magic on Flowers TV.

== Early life ==
Lakshmi was born in Koorkenchery, Thrissur, to Unnikrishnan and Bindu. She began learning classical music at the age of seven and has won prizes in acting, monoact, and music competitions at the Kerala School Kalolsavam. She completed her schooling from St.Paul's Convent School, Kuriachira and I.E.S Public School, Thrissur. She completed Bachelor of Arts degree in Functional English from Christ College, Irinjalakuda and MBA from ELIMS.

== Career ==
She started her career as a Radio Jockey in Red FM in 2007. Lakshmi started her career as a VJ from a cable channel in Thrissur and later selected to host programmes in Jeevan TV (2008) School time which was a programme for school children to showcase their talents and Its "Really Tasty" which was a cookery show specialised in south Indian cuisine. Lakshmi also hosted Onam special programme in Amrita TV which was named as "Campus Onakkalam", "Chit chat" in WE Channel where she interviewed leading actors and actresses of south India, "Dew drops (2009)" in WE channel, which was a popular Malayalam television, Live phone-in-programme which laid a milestone in her career as an anchor.

== List of works ==
=== Television ===
Year	Title	Role	Channel	Notes
2008	School Time	Host	Jeevan TV	
2009-2012	Really Tasty	Host	Jeevan TV	Cookery show for South Indian cuisine
2009	Chit Chat	Host	We Channel	Celebrity talk show
2009	Dew Drops	Anchor	We Channel	Live phone-in program
2011	Campus Onakkalam	Host	Amrita TV	Onam-special program
2012	Tharolsavam	Host	Kairali TV	
2012	Patturumal – Music, Dance & Fusion	Host	Kairali TV	
2013	Kuttipatturumal	Host	Kairali TV	
2014	Mylanchi	Host	Asianet	Musical reality show
2016	Mylanchy Little Champion	Host	Asianet Plus	
2017	Asianet Super Voice	Host	Asianet Plus	Musical reality show
2017–2019	Tamaar Padaar	Host	Flowers TV	Game show
2019–2022	Star Magic (Tamaar Padaar 2)	Host	Flowers TV	Game show
2021-2022	Super power	Host	Flowers TV	Game show
2022–2024	Star Comedy Magic (Star Magic 2)	Host	Flowers TV	Game show
2024–present	Super Show	Host	Zee Keralam	Game show

=== Stage events ===
She has hosted stage shows in South India, Abu Dhabi, and Doha.

Year	Event	Role	Venue	Notes
2013	X-mas Gala 2013	Anchor	Thiruvalla	Kairali TV's Christmas event
2014	17th Asianet Film Awards	Interviewer		Interviewed South Indian celebrities
		Host	Angamaly Carnival	Musical stage show with Naresh Iyer
		Anchor	Coimbatore Carnival	
	Mega Show	Anchor		Kairali TV musical event
	Vayalar Ramavarma Memorial Foundation Society Award Night	Anchor		
2016	Asianet Television Awards	Host		
2016	Red FM Malayalam Music Awards	Host		
2017	Red FM Malayalam Music Awards	Host		
2017	Yuva Awards	Host		
2018	Red FM Malayalam Music Awards	Host		
