= Sobha City Mall =

Shopping mall in Kerala, India

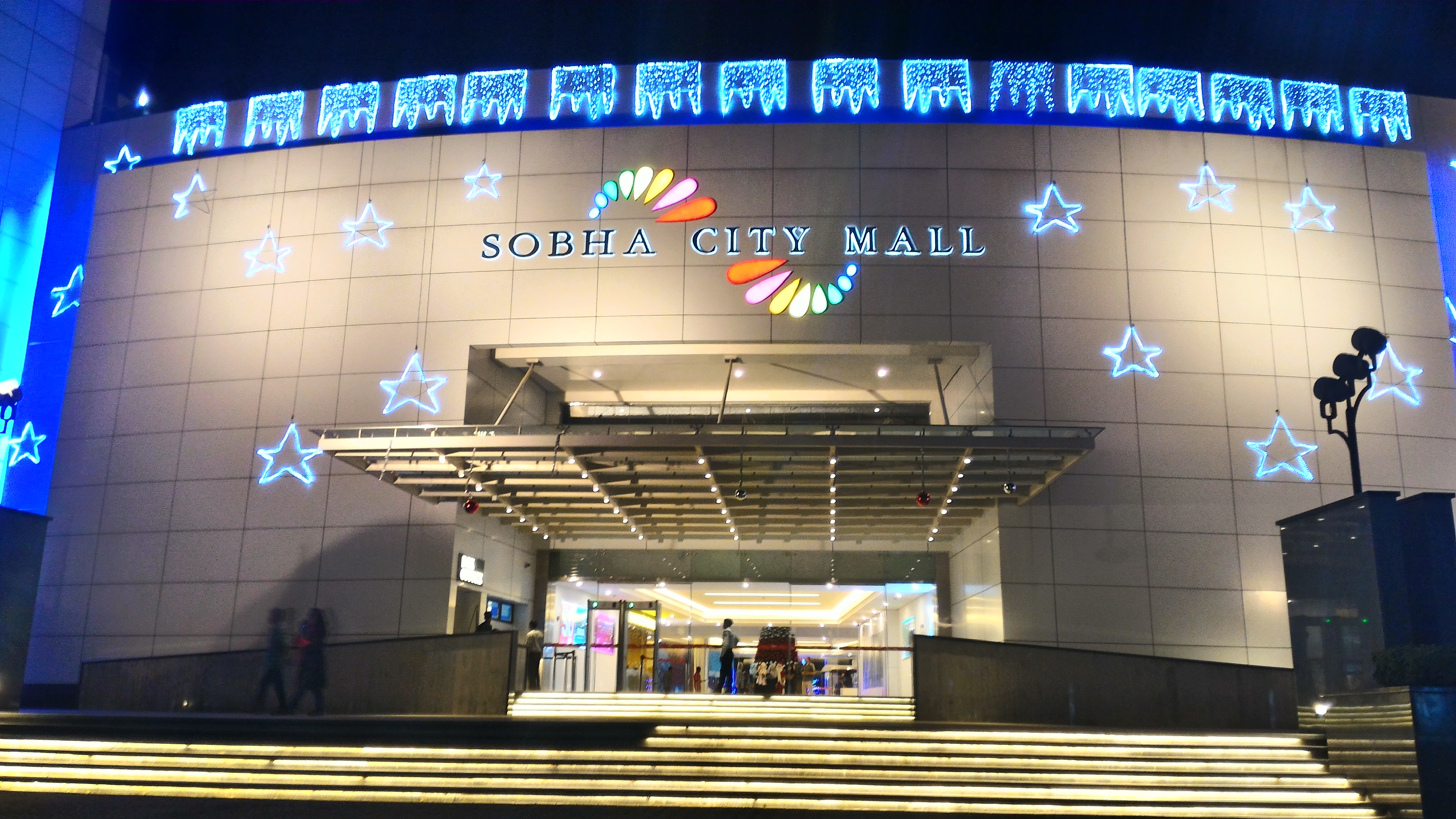
- Night view of Main entrance of Sobha City Mall
- Location: Puzhakkal, Thrissur, India
- Coordinates: 10.549886°N 76.183081°E
- Opened: 17 December 2015
- Owner: sobha ltd.
- Architect: y
- Floor area: 450,000 square feet (42,000 m^{2})
- Floors: 3
- Website: sobhacitymall.in

Sobha City Mall is a shopping mall in Sobha City, Puzhakkal, Thrissur City, Kerala, India. The Mall opened on 17 December 2015. It is built on 4.7 acres (1.9 ha) land and covers an area of 450,000 square feet (42,000 m^{2}). The mall is centrally air-conditioned and has a six screen multiplex by INOX. It offers a luxury business hotel, office space, restaurants, food courts and a 600 car parking facility.

== See also ==
- Lulu International Shopping Mall, Kochi
