= Vilangan Hills =

Indian hillock

Coordinates: 10.5571°N 76.1690°E

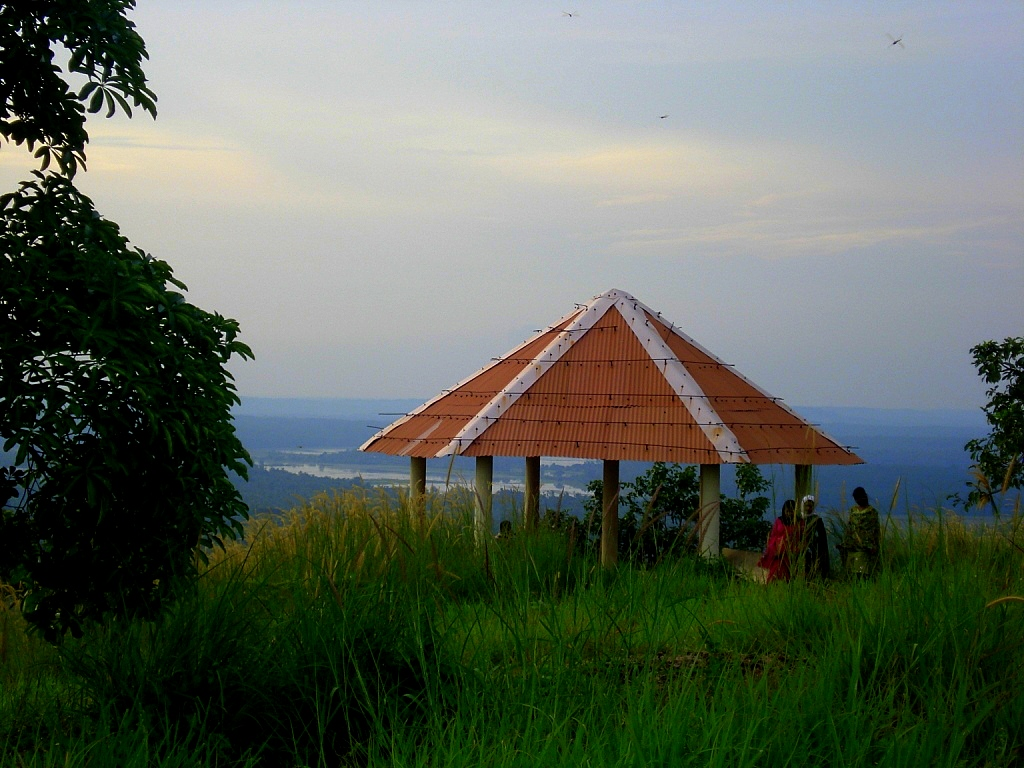
- Vilangan Hills is a popular picnic spot of Thrissur city residents

Highest point
- Elevation: 80 m (260 ft)

Naming
- English translation: വിലങ്ങൻ കുന്ന്
- Language of name: Malayalam

Geography
- Location: Kerala, India
- Parent range: Independent, adjacent to the Western Ghats
- Topo map: Laterite hill

Geology
- Rock age(s): Cenozoic, 100 to 80 mya
- Mountain type: Fault

Climbing
- Easiest route: Road

Vilangan Hills (Malayalam: വിലങ്ങൻ കുന്ന്) is a hillock located in Adat Panchayat, near Thrissur city of Kerala state in India. The hill gives a panoramic view of Thrissur city and Thrissur-Ponnani Kole Wetlands from the top. The hill was referred as an Oxygen Jar of Thrissur city. It is rumoured to be a sleeping volcano. The name 'Vilangan Kunnu' is a misnomer because 'Vilangan' itself means hill. There is no need of adding 'Kunnu' after 'Vilangan'. It is an ancient Malayalam word derived from proto-Dravidian language. Till the 1970s the word 'Kunnu' was not used by revenue authorities and locals. It is a recent addition. In Tamil too 'Vilangan' means hill.

== Geography ==
The Vilangan is a laterite hill which has a radius of 8 kilometres. The top of the hill is around 5 acres and the height is 80 metres from the sea level.

== Facilities ==
The hill has an open-air theatre, children's park, Kudumbashree canteen, Vilangan Trekkers Club and Asokavanam Samiti. The hill has a medicinal garden called Asokavanam maintained by Vilangan Trekkers Club and Asokavanam Samiti in association with Department of Tourism (Kerala) and Oushadhi. The foot of the hill opens at the highway near Amala Hospital and the road to the apex of the hill starts from here. The hill remains open from 07.00 AM to 07.00 PM.

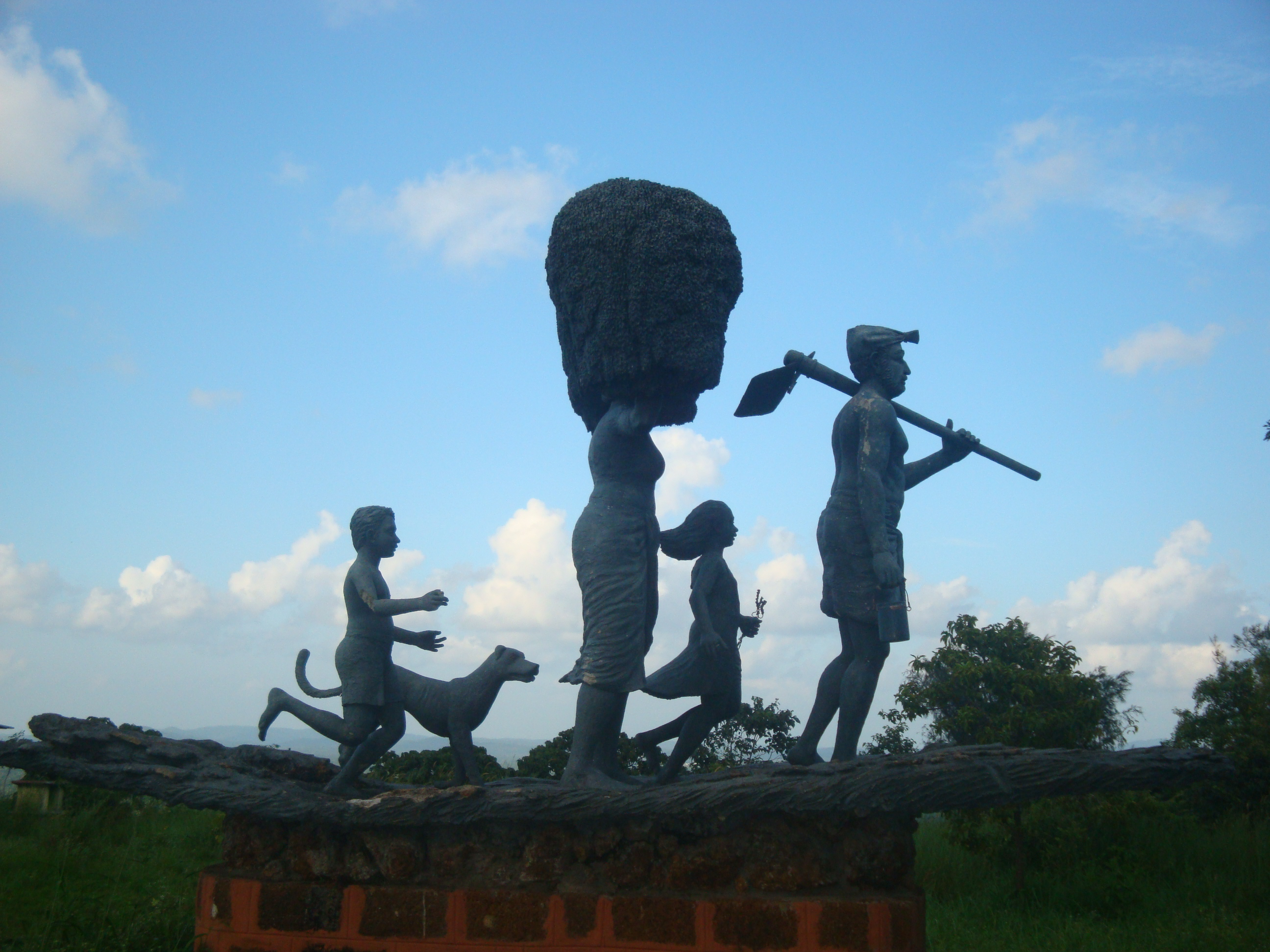
An Artistic work from Vilangan Hills

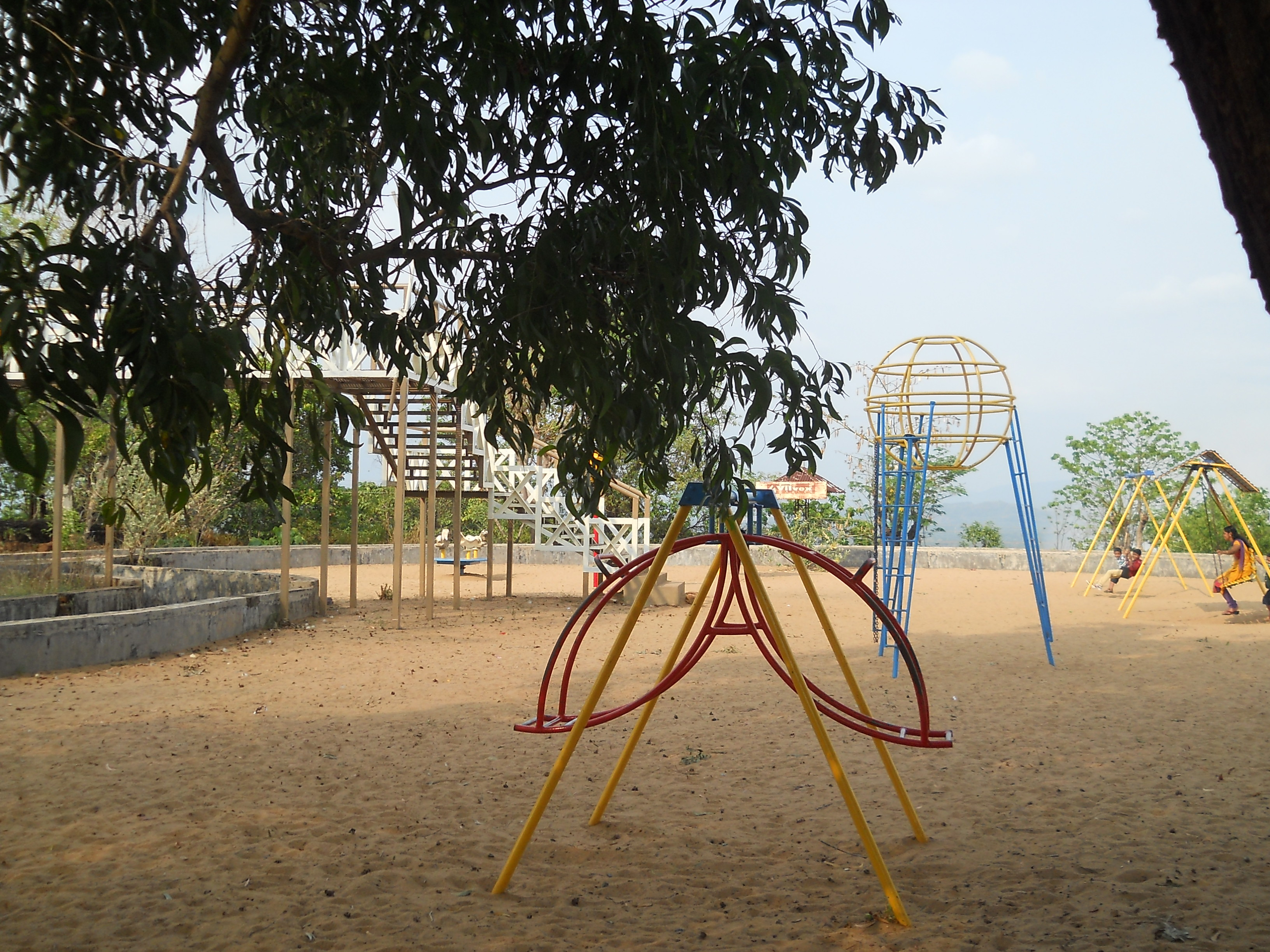
Children's Park
