= Mary Queen Church, Thoppil =

Mary Queen Church
- Mary Queen Church, Thoppil
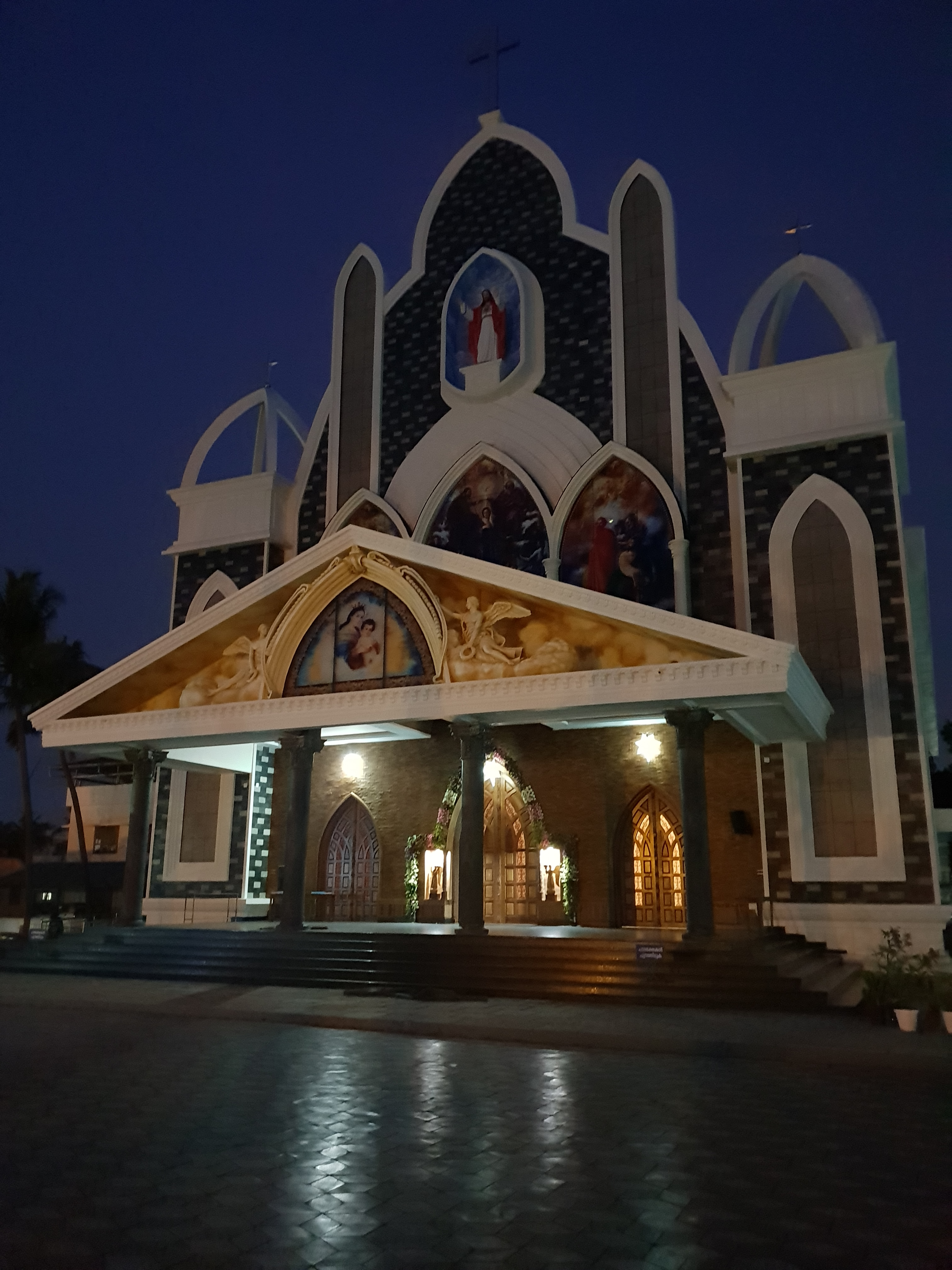
- Mary Queen Church
- 10°02′53″N 76°32′21″E
- Location: Thoppil, Thrikkakkara, Ernakulam district, Kerala
- Country: India
- Denomination: Syro-Malabar Catholic Church
- Churchmanship: High church
- Website: Official website

History
- Status: Church
- Founder: Mathew Kammattil
- Dedication: Mother Mary
- Consecrated: 1961

Architecture
- Functional status: Active
- Architectural type: Modern
- Groundbreaking: 1 November 2015
- Completed: 8 December 2018

Administration
- Diocese: Syro-Malabar Catholic Major Archeparchy of Ernakulam-Angamaly
- Parish: Mary Queen Church parish

Clergy
- Archbishop: Mar George Alencherry
- Vicar: Fr. Tharian Njaliath

Mary Queen Church, popularly known as Thoppil Palli, is a parish church coming under the Syro-Malabar Catholic Major Archeparchy of Ernakulam-Angamaly. It is situated along Thrikkakkara - Kakkanad road, at Thoppil, in Ernakulam district of the south Indian state of Kerala.

== Overview ==
The origin of Mary Queen Church was from a small community prayer hall, built in 1951 at Thoppil junction, a small hamlet off Thrikkakkara, in Ernakulam district. It took another ten years to build a chapel there which was consecrated in 1961. The chapel functioned under the jurisdiction of St. George's Forane Church, Edapally and had service only on Sundays. The chapel was later replaced by a new larger church which was consecrated on 2 September 1972 by Joseph Parecattil, the then cardinal of Ernakulam Archdiocese. In 2002, the church became an independent parish under the Syro-Malabar Catholic Major Archeparchy of Ernakulam-Angamaly.

The church soon became inadequate for the growing number of parishioners and in 2011, the church committee, under the leadership of the vicar, Antony Eravimangalam, decided to build a new church complex comprising a new church, rectory and a parish hall. The initial attempt was to construct the parish hall and rectory, which was duly completed in 2015. The service was temporarily shifted to the new parish hall which facilitated the demotion of the old church and the construction of a new one in its place. The ground breaking ceremony was done on 8 January 2016 and the church was consecrated on 8 December 2018 by Jacob Manathodath, the Apostolic Administrator of the Syro-Malabar Catholic Major Archeparchy of Ernakulam-Angamaly.

The church parish hosts the catholic families residing in around Thrikkakara and as of December 2018, has a strength of 450 families comprising 2000 members.

== Activities ==
The main festival of the church is the Feast of Mother Mary which is celebrated every year on the first Sunday on or after 8 September. The parish also hosts several catholic organizations such as the Society of Saint Vincent de Paul, Women's Welfare, Legion of Mary, family units, St. Mary's Death Assistance fund, and Children's Association.

== See also ==
- St. George's Forane Church

== Gallery ==
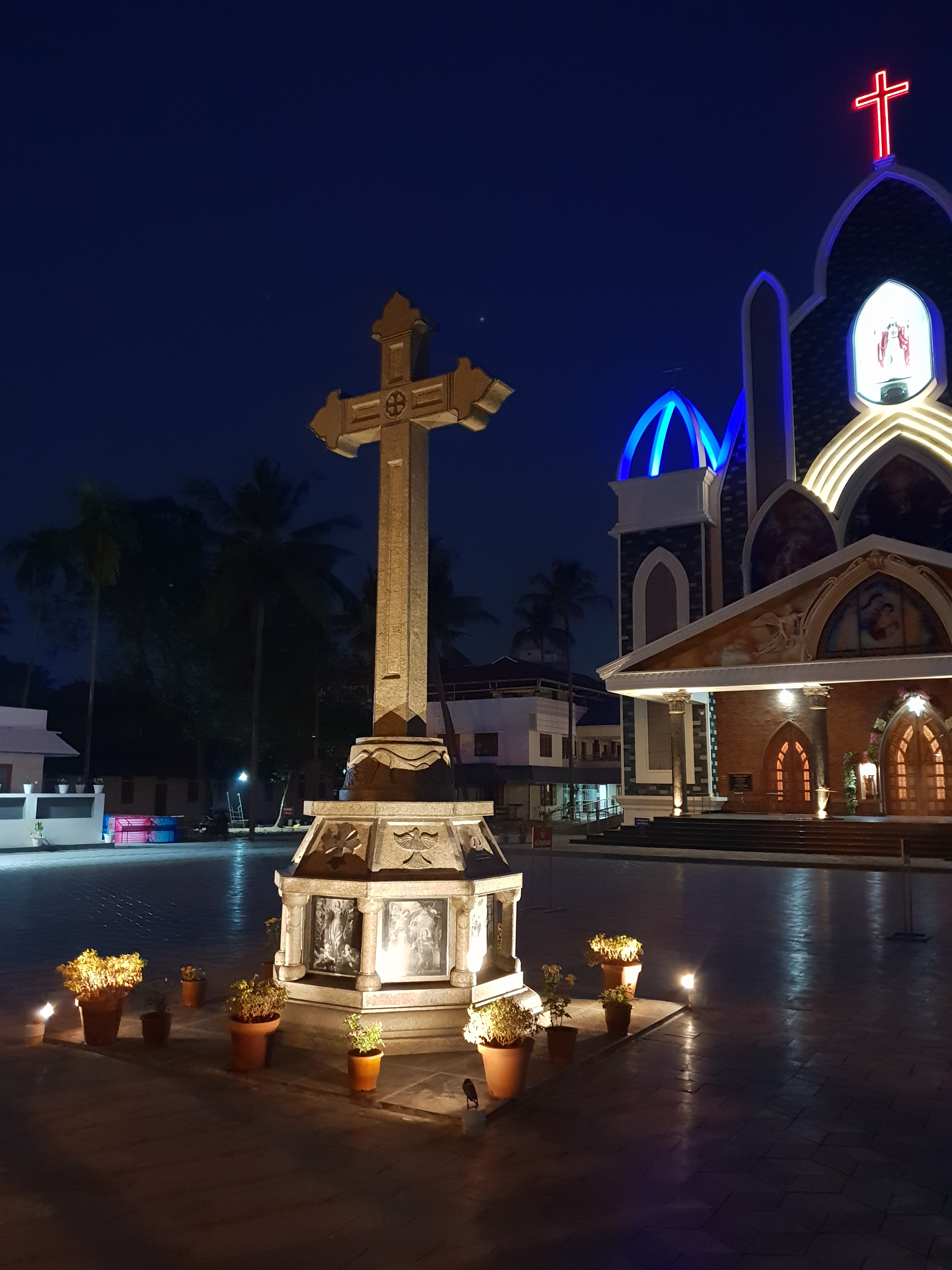
The Holy Cross in front of the church

Profile view

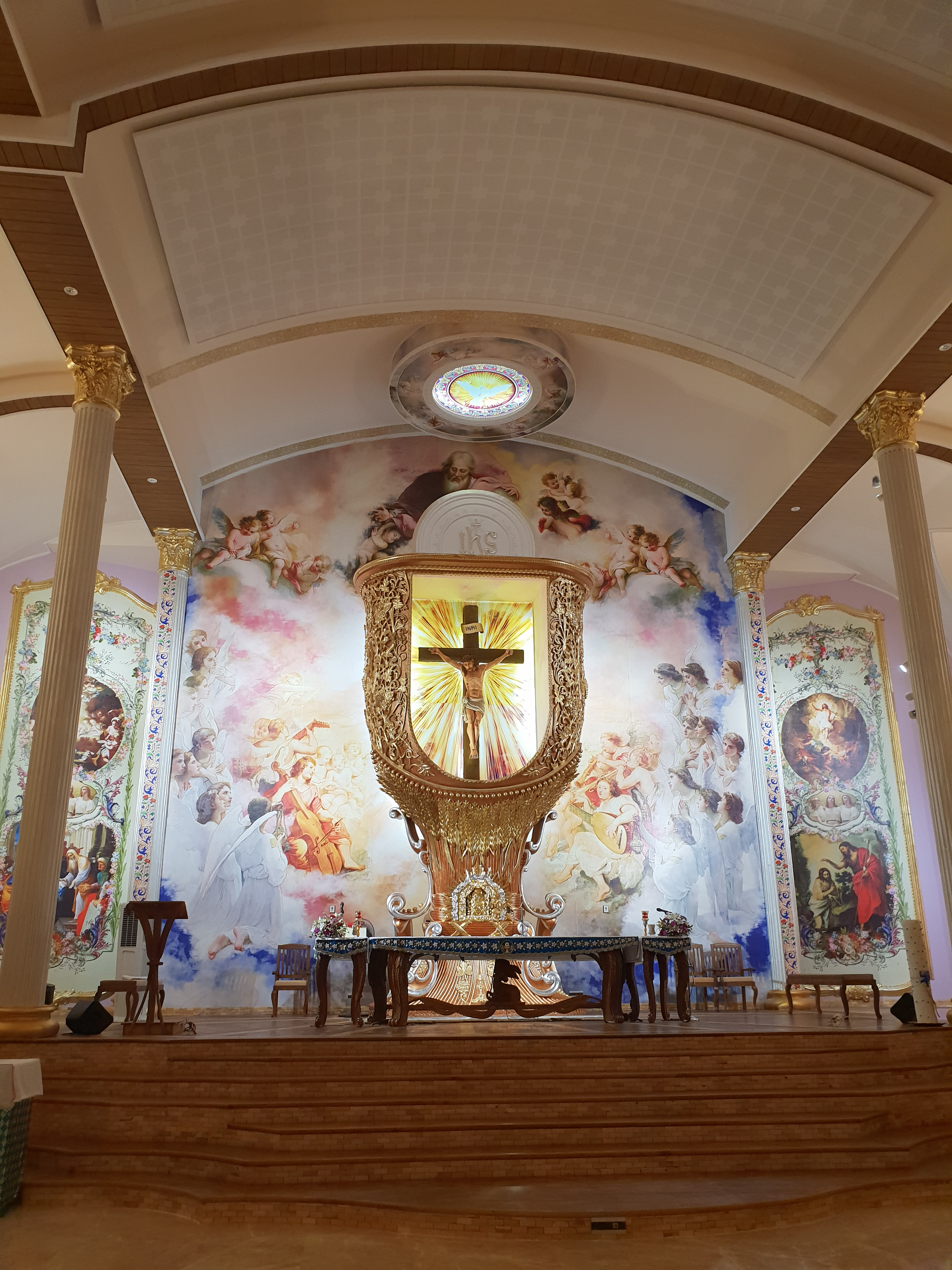
Altar

Mother Mary grotto
