= St. George's Syro-Malabar Forane Church, Edappally =

St. George's Forane Church
- St. George's Syro Malabar Forane Church, Edappally
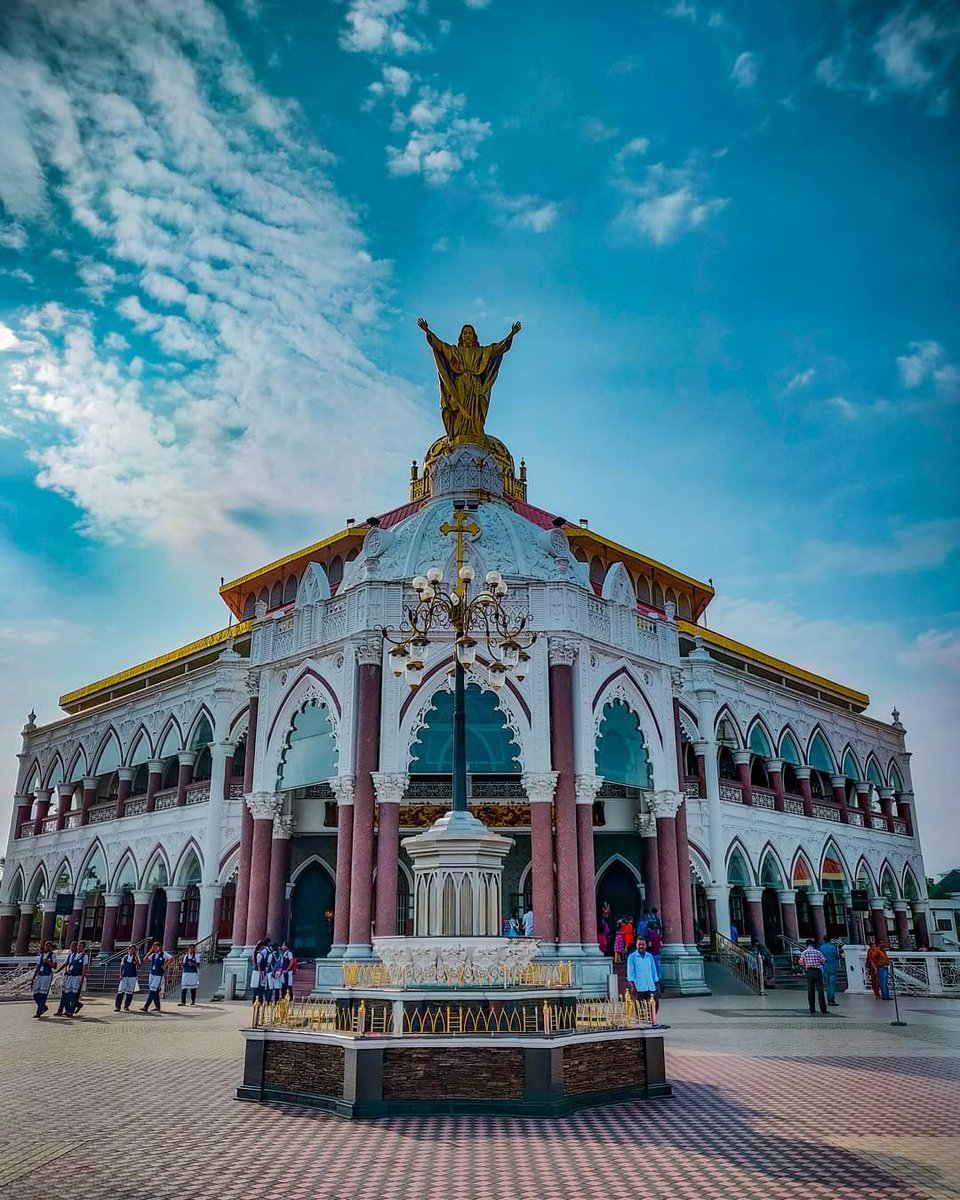
- St. George's Forane Church
- 10°1′19″N 76°18′19″E
- Location: Edappally, Kochi
- Country: India
- Denomination: Syro-Malabar Catholic Church
- Website: www.stgeorgeforanechurchedappally.org

History
- Former name: Marth Mariam Church
- Status: Church
- Founded: c. AD 593; 1433 years ago
- Dedication: Saint George (Formerly Mary)
- Consecrated: 19 April 2015

Architecture
- Functional status: Active
- Architect(s): Mr. Zeril Jose and Mr. Koshy K. Alex, Partners of Vastushilpalaya Consultancy Pvt. Ltd., and Prasanth P. George
- Groundbreaking: 1 January 2001
- Completed: 19 April 2015

St. George's Forane Church, locally known as Edapally Church (Malayalam: ഇടപ്പള്ളി പള്ളി) is a Syro Malabar Catholic pilgrimage church in Edapally, Kochi, India. It is considered as Asia's largest shrine dedicated to Saint George, about five million people visit it every year.

The church is thought to have been founded in 593 AD. It is regarded as one of the oldest churches in Kerala, after the seven churches founded by Thomas the Apostle in the first century AD. The church was originally dedicated to the Marth Mariam (Virgin Mary). In 1080, a new church was built adjacent to the old church. A nine-day festival is celebrated annually as part of the Feast of Saint George (23 April). The church, also a destination for non-Christians, attracts offerings of gold, chicken, and eggs.

== History ==
The church has a 14-century history. Its perennial well attracted many people, and the church became a pilgrimage site.

According to historians, Thomas the Apostle (Mar Thoma Sleeha in Malayalam/Syriac) built seven churches. The Edapally church was built during the sixth century, shortly after the construction of the seven churches.

A statue of St. George (Mar Geevarghese Sahada) on horseback, stabbing a serpent under his horse's hooves, is prominent. The church blends religion, magic, myth, folklore and history. Edappally was a hamlet, part of the princely kingdom of Elangalloor. Its Syrian Christian congregation was small, descendants of those who were converted to Christianity by St. Thomas the Apostle (who came to India in 52 AD). The oldest Edappally church was built in 593, and the one-room building is preserved as a storehouse. It was built by families from Paravur who had to travel to the Kottakkavu Mar Thoma Syro-Malabar Church, North Paravur to worship.

The congregation outgrew the old church, and a second church was built in 1080. Its main Madaba/altar and façade were renovated during the 1970s, and a picture of the Virgin Mary was added. The imported-tile floor remains.

The 1400th anniversary of the church's founding was celebrated on 18 January 1994. Mother Teresa visited from Calcutta as the chief guest. To commemorate the occasion, a bell tower was constructed on the church premises and a bell installed. The bell was later moved to the archangel tower of the new church.

The foundation stone for the third church, blessed by Pope John Paul II, was laid on 1 January 2001. The octagonal, 141-foot-high (43 m) church covers a 88,000-square-foot (8,200 m^{2}) area, and is one of India's largest churches. Blending European and Keralite architecture, its madbaha/altar is made of teak covered with gold foil imported from Italy and it has two bell towers. Old (original sin, Noah's Ark and Cain and Abel) and New Testament scenes (the story of Jesus) are depicted as sculptures. The altar, depicting the Resurrection, is surrounded by carvings in Vietnamese marble. The 19,500-square-foot (1,810 m^{2}) main chapel has a capacity of 5,000, and the entire church can hold 10,000 people. The two older churches have been preserved for their historic importance.

Architect Koshy Alex & Architect Zeril Jose of Vastushilpalaya Consultancy Pvt. Ltd. and Prasanth P George were the new church's architects. The church courtyard has a well, and devotees believe that its water has curative powers.

== Architecture ==
According to historians, Thomas the Apostle (Mar Thoma Sleeha in Malayalam/Syriac) built seven churches. The Edapally church was built during the sixth century, shortly after the construction of the seven churches.

=== Church built in 593 A.D ===
Edappally was a hamlet, part of the princely kingdom of Elangalloor. Its Syrian Christian congregation was small, descendants of those who were converted to Christianity by St. Thomas the Apostle (who came to India in 52 AD). The oldest Edappally church was built in 593, by families from Paravur who had to travel to the Kottakkavu Mar Thoma Syro-Malabar Church, North Paravur to worship.

The church was dedicated to Virgin Mary called Marth Mariam in local parlance in the beginning and later came to be known by Saint George’s name once he was declared as the patron saint of England. This Church was built about 300 years after the martyrdom of St. George, who was a soldier. Later he became a follower of Christ and strictly followed the scriptures. He attained martyrdom when he stood against the religious persecution under Emperor Diocletus. After his death, scores of churches came up across Europe and other places in his name. A statue of St. George (Mar Geevarghese Sahada) on horseback, stabbing a serpent under his horse's hooves, is prominent. Today the it is used as an Adoration Chapel and attracts numerous visitors throughout the year.

=== Church built in 1080 A.D ===
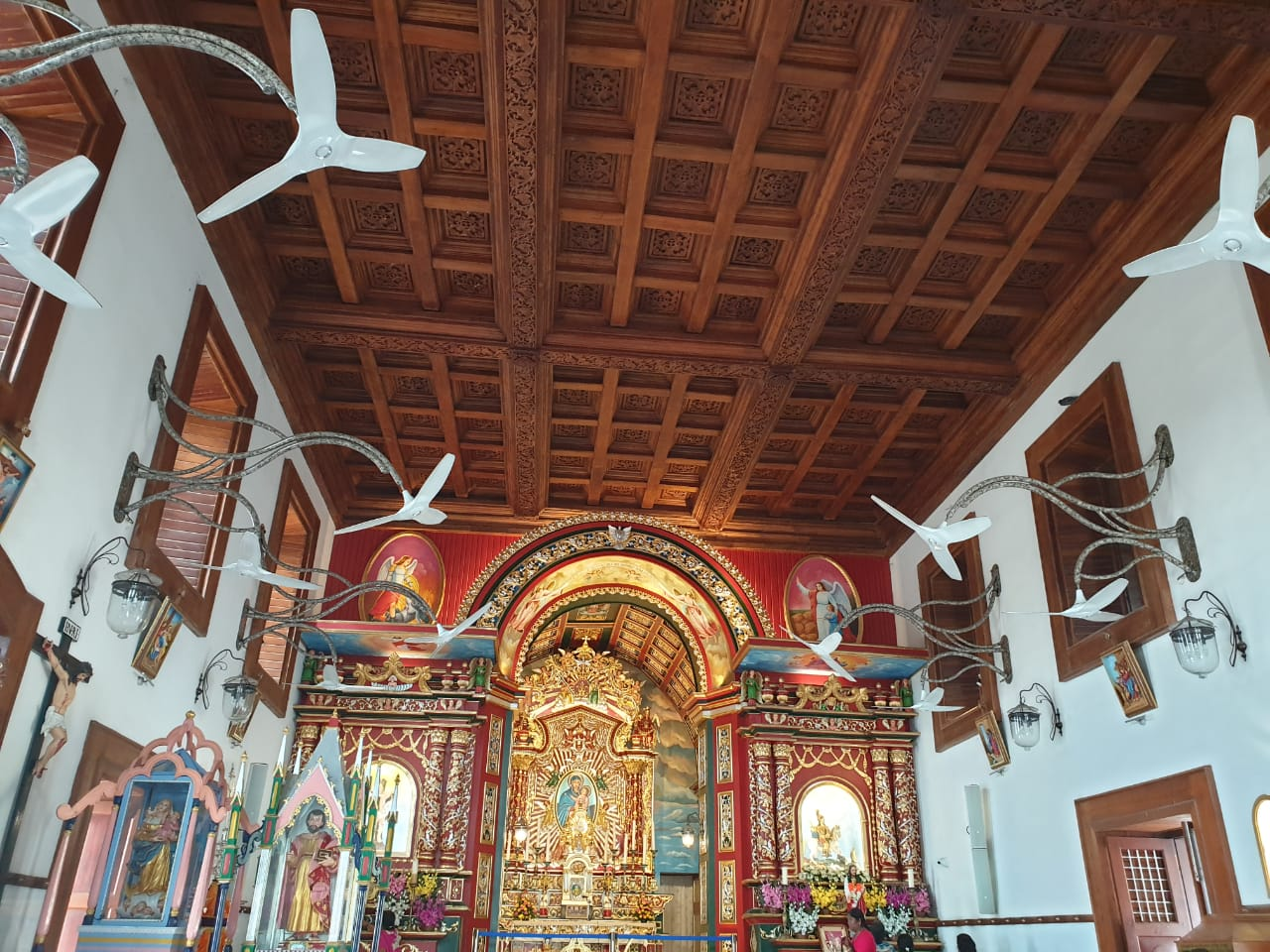
Interior of the 1080 A.D old church

The congregation outgrew the old church, and a second church was built in 1080. Its main madbaha/altar and façade were renovated during the 1970s, and a picture of the Virgin Mary was added. The imported-tile floor remains. Now, the second church serves as a museum

=== Church built in 2015 A.D ===
The foundation stone for the third church, blessed by Pope John Paul II, was laid on 1 January 2001. The octagonal, 141-foot-high (43 m) church covers a 88,000-square-foot (8,200 m^{2}) area, and is one of India's largest churches. Blending European and Keralite architecture, its Madaba/altar is made of teak covered with gold foil imported from Italy and it has two bell towers. Old (original sin, Noah's Ark and Cain and Abel) and New Testament scenes (the story of Jesus) are depicted as sculptures. The altar, depicting the Resurrection, is surrounded by carvings in Vietnamese marble. The 19,500-square-foot (1,810 m^{2}) main chapel has a capacity of 5,000, and the entire church can hold 10,000 people. The two older churches have been preserved for their historic importance.

== Organizations ==
Darsana Samooham is a lay religious organisation associated with the church, dedicated to the Virgin Mary or a saint connected with a religious order. Edappally's Darsana Samooham is the world's largest. Members usually wear religious dress. It is governed by an elected committee which includes a president, treasurer, and secretary. The Edappally's Darsana Samooham helps organize the annual feast and participates in the festival procession.

The Marian Sodality, founded by Payyappilly Joseph Kathanar in 1927, promotes spirituality among parish youth. Similarly, the Cherupushpa Mission League (founded in 1972) works to instill Christian values in the youth of the parish. Thirubalasakyam is a children's organization associated with the church, and most children in the parish are members.

St. Joseph's Maranananthara Sahaya Fund is an association of parish members to assist financially stressed parish families with funeral expenses. It is funded by life memberships or monthly subscriptions collected from members. St. George's Charitable Fund is managed by the church to provide financial assistance to the poor, regardless of religion.

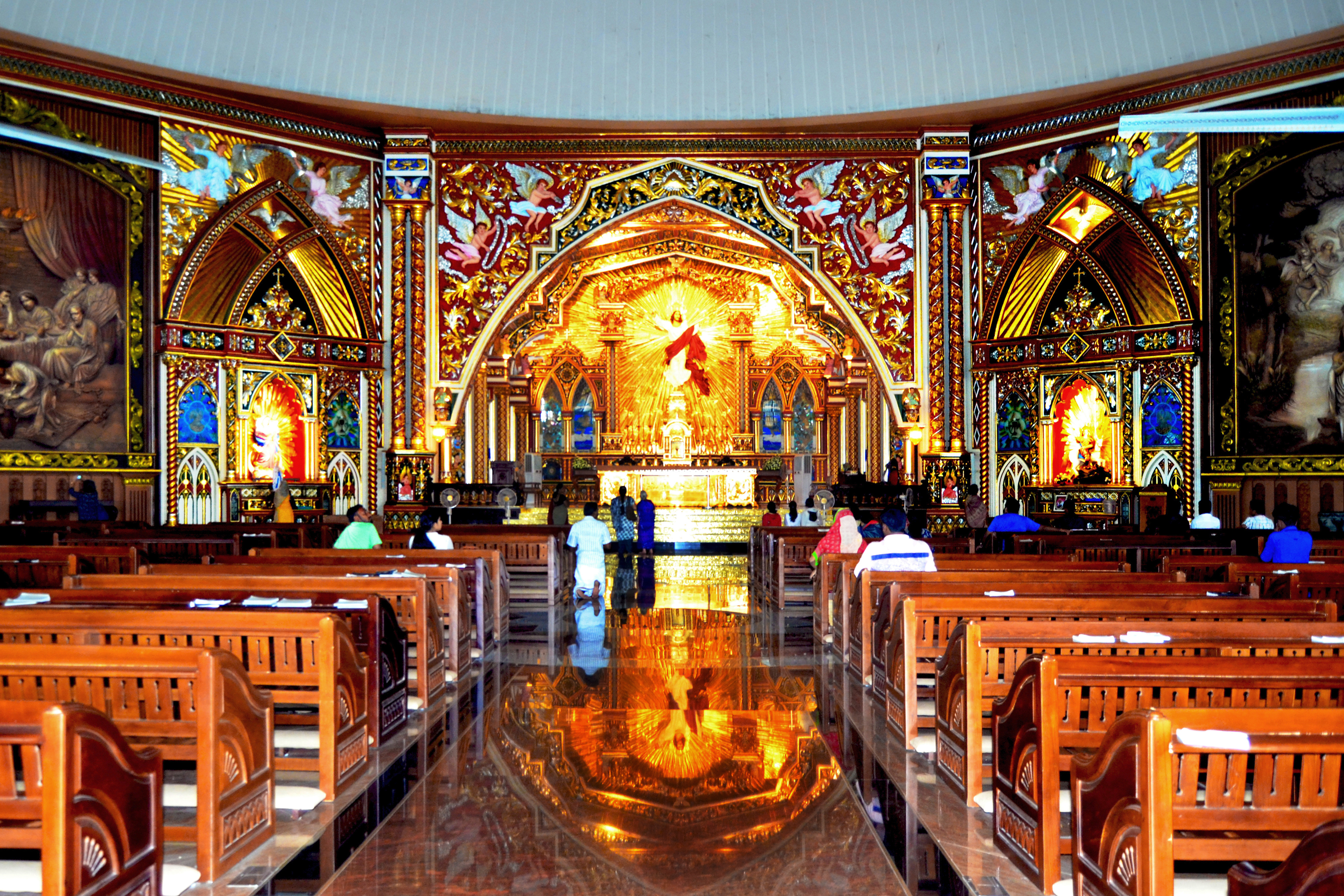
St.GEORGE'S CHURCH, INSIDE VIEW

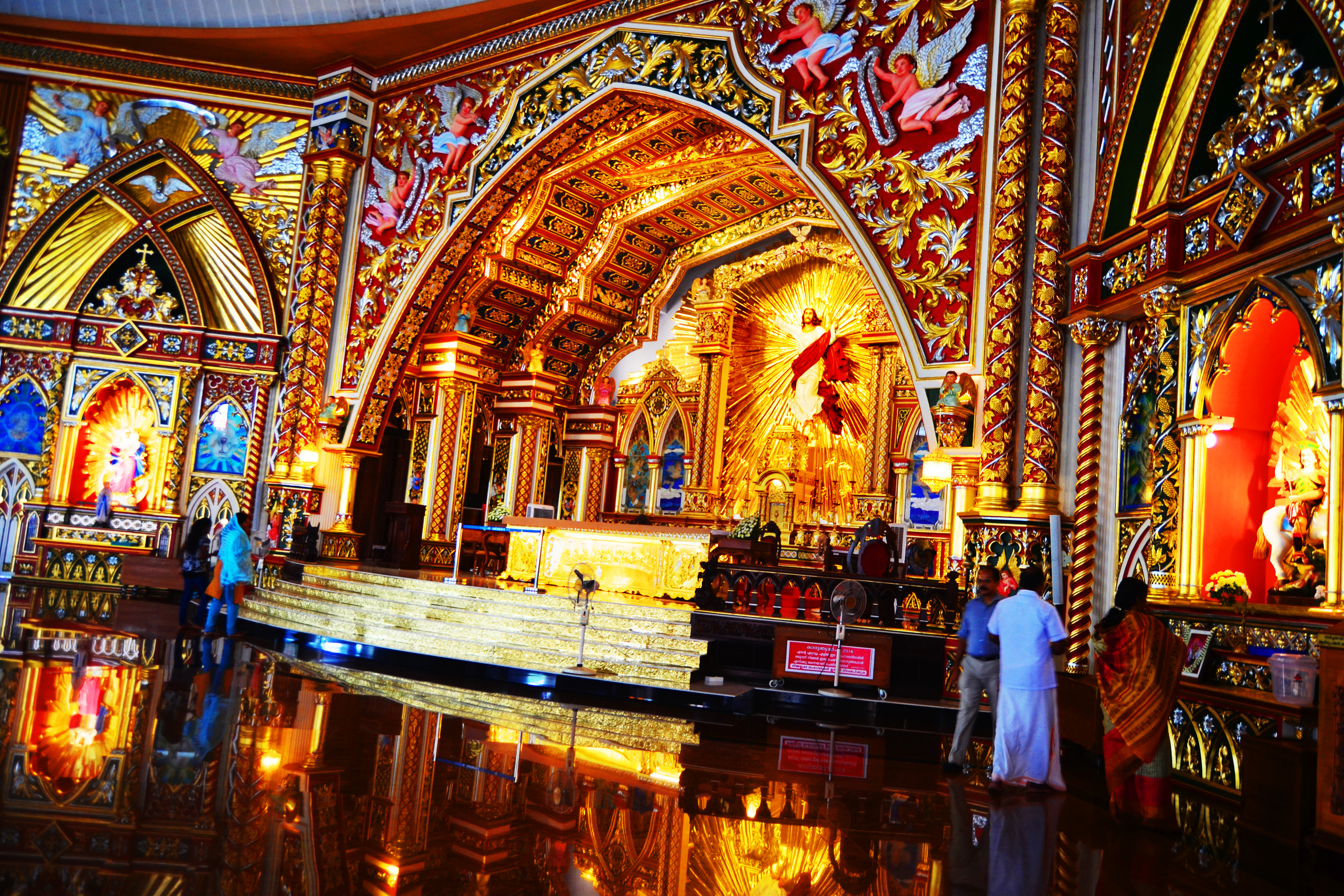
St.GEORGE'S CHURCH, MAIN ALTAR SIDE VIEW

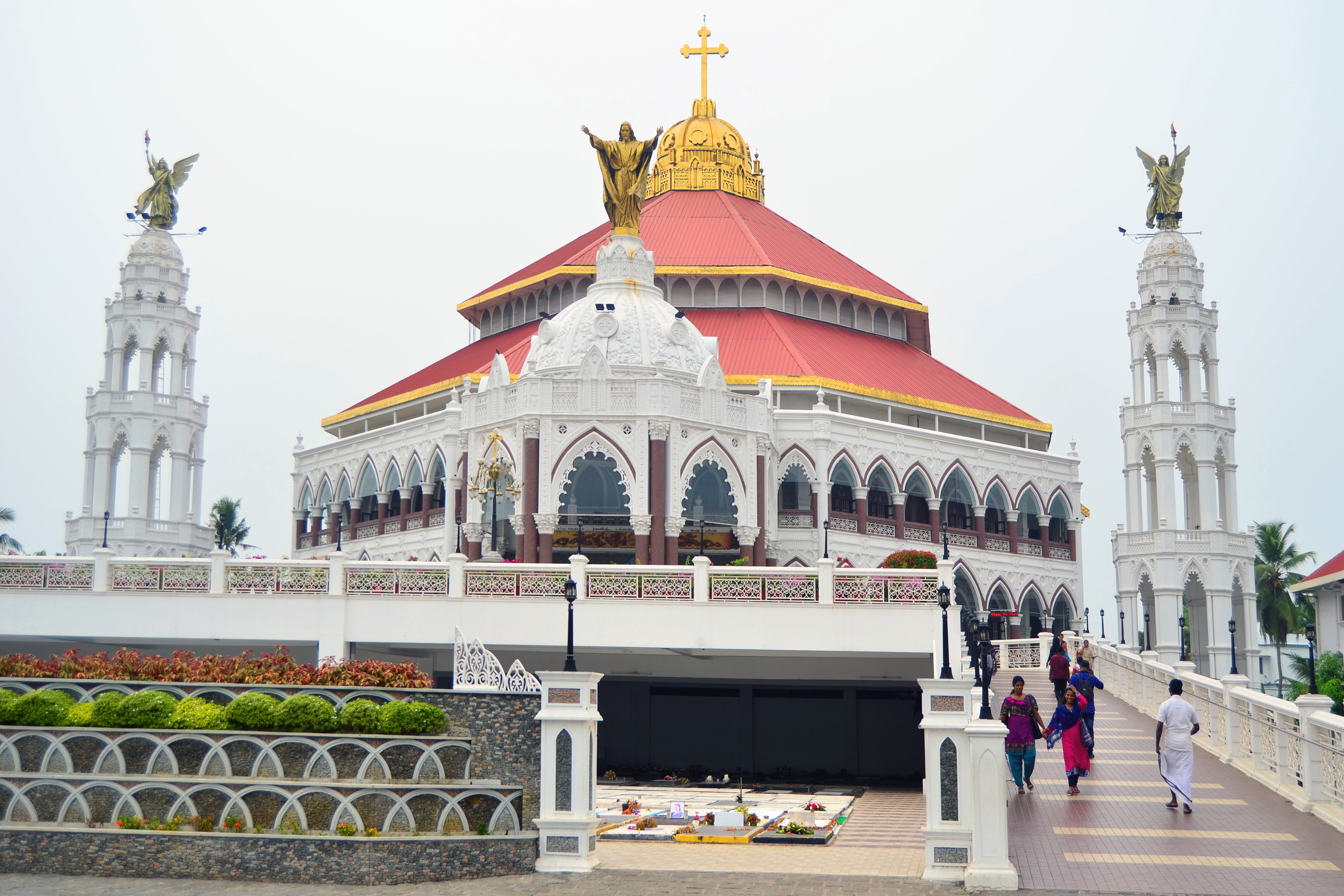
St.GEORGE'S CHURCH, WITH CHURCHYARD VIEW

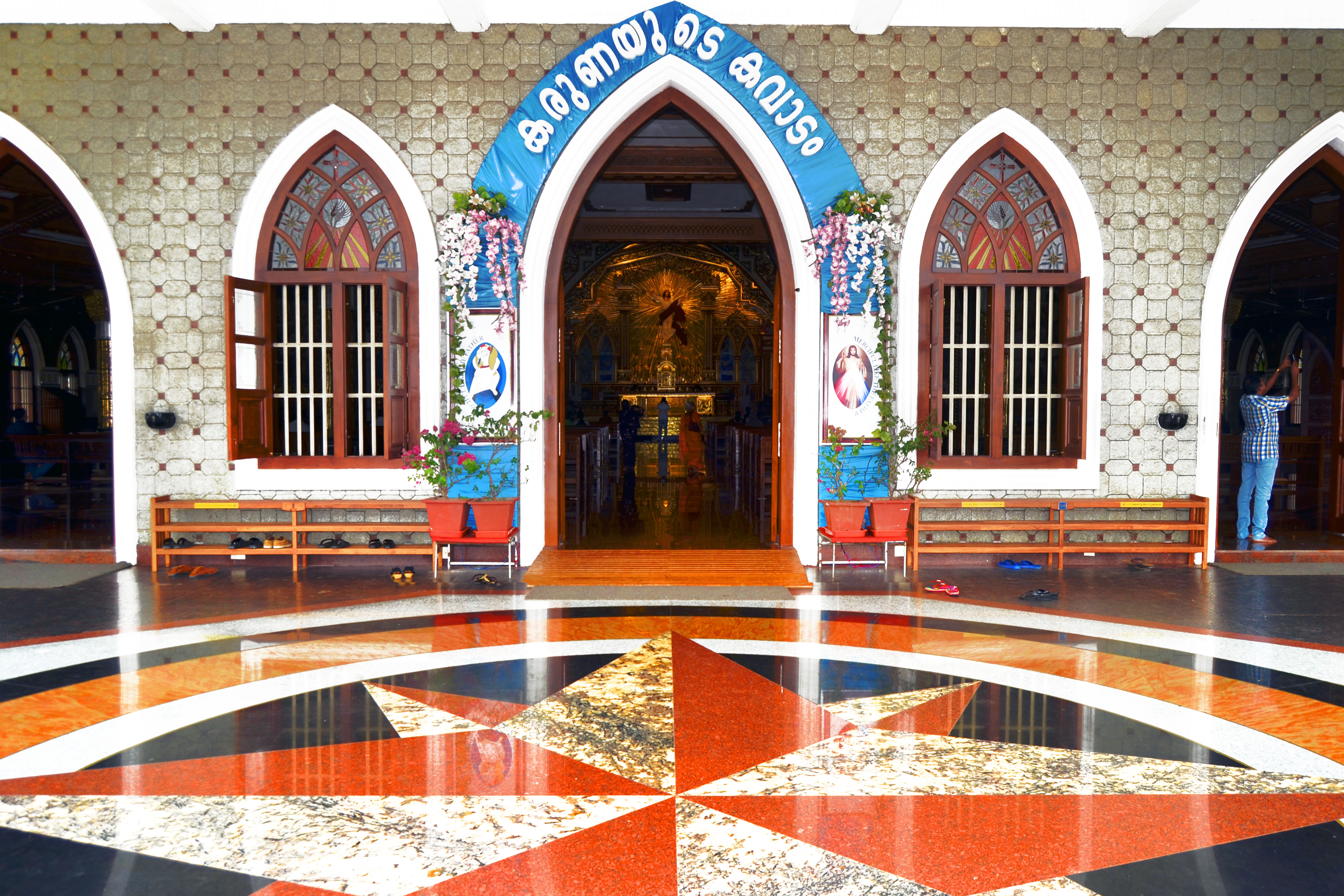
St.GEORGE'S CHURCH ENTRANCE

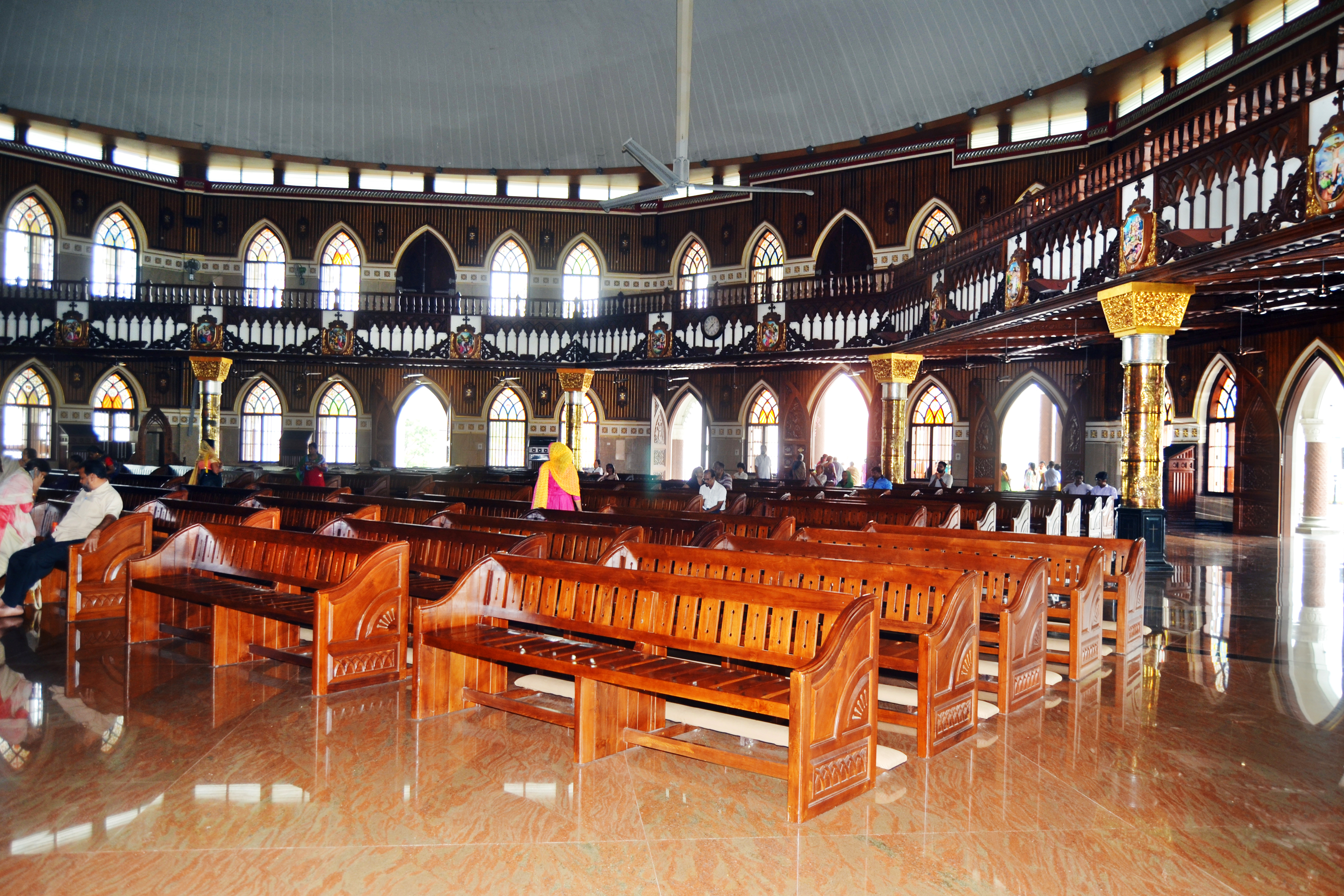
St.GEORGE'S CHURCH INSIDE VIEW

== Mar Giwargis Sahada ==
The church was built about 300 years after the martyrdom of Saint George (Mar Giwargis Sahada). Mar Giwargis is known to have been born in Lod, Syria Palaestina around AD 275–285. A soldier, he reached the rank of tribunus in the imperial guard of the Emperor Diocletian at Nicomedia. Mar Giwargis was a believer in Christ and lived his life according to the scriptures. During the Diocletianic Persecution, he defended his faith and was put to death. Many churches sprang up throughout Europe and parts of the East dedicated to St. George, the patron saint of England.

The Edappally church became known as St. George's Church. The statue of St. George on horseback depicts the saint and his horse killing a serpent, a symbol of Satan.

== Gallery ==
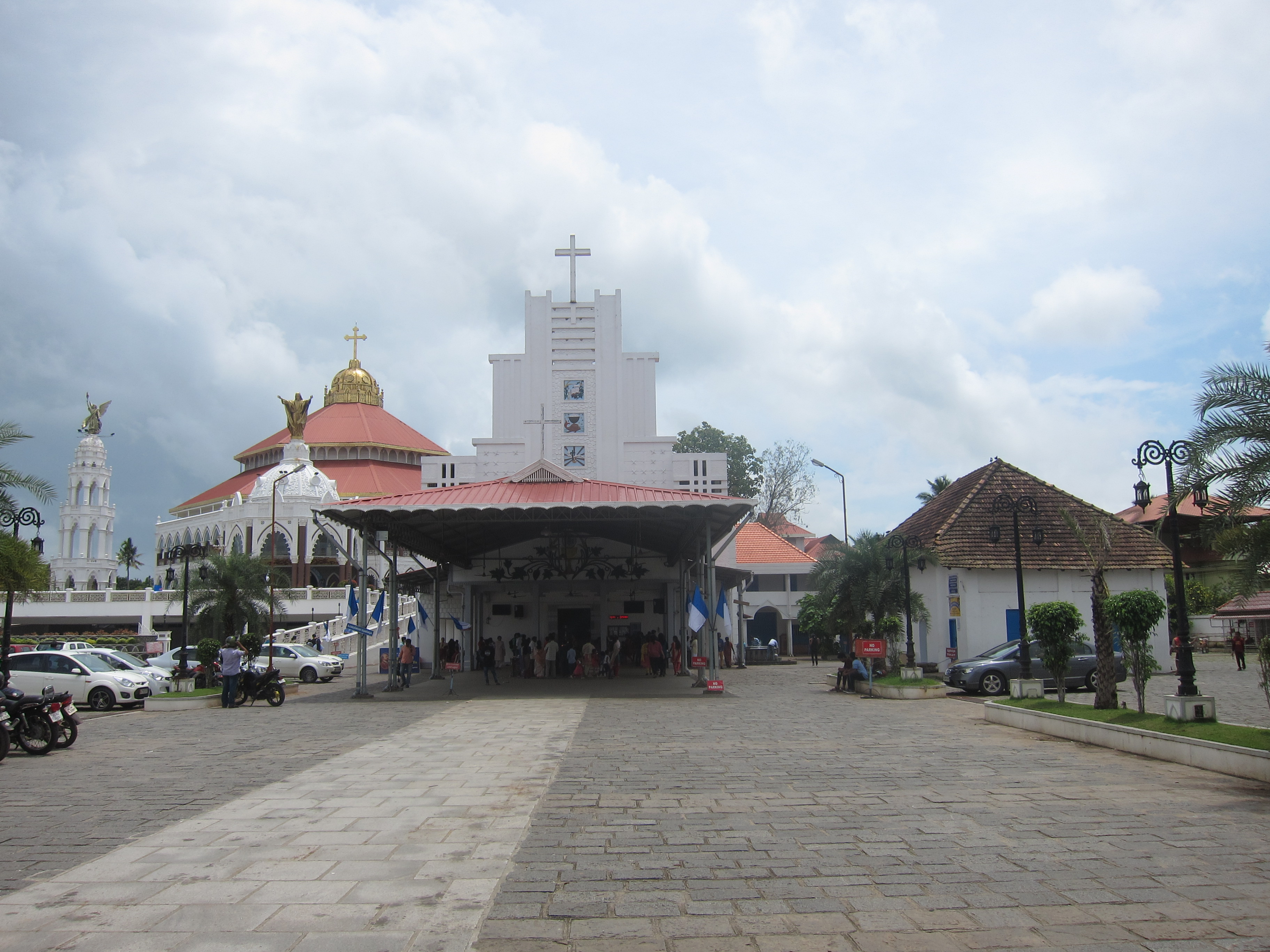

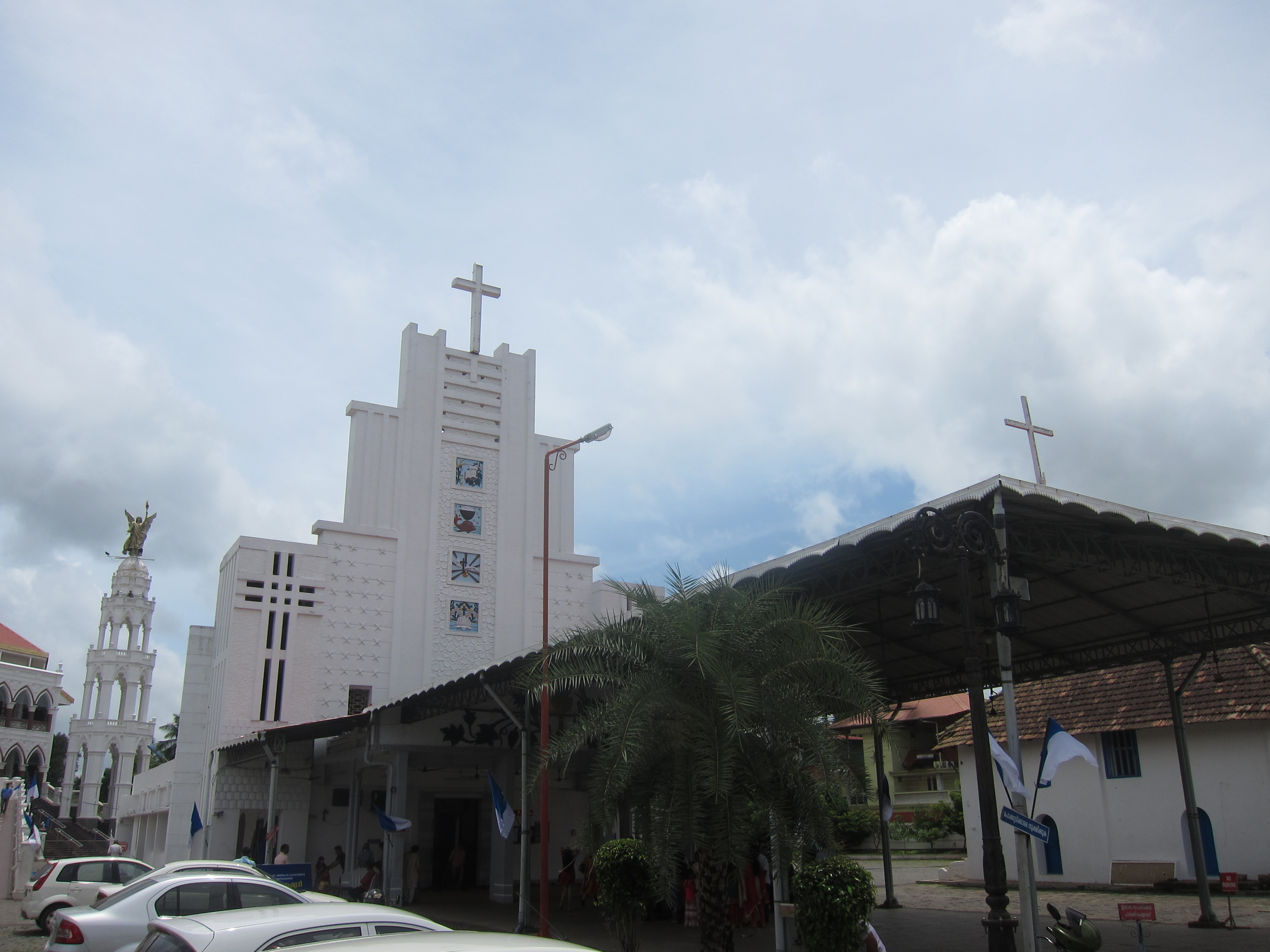

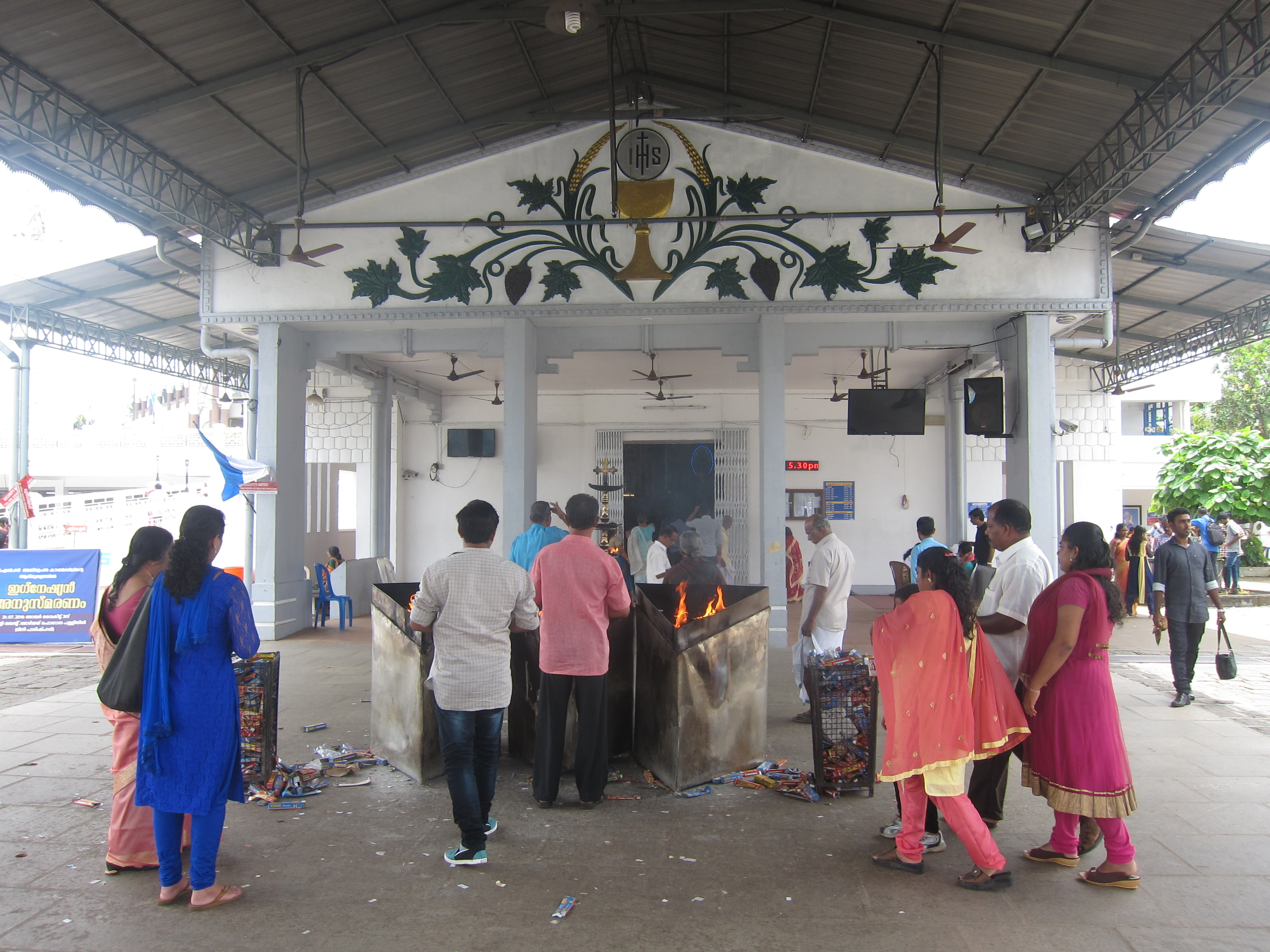

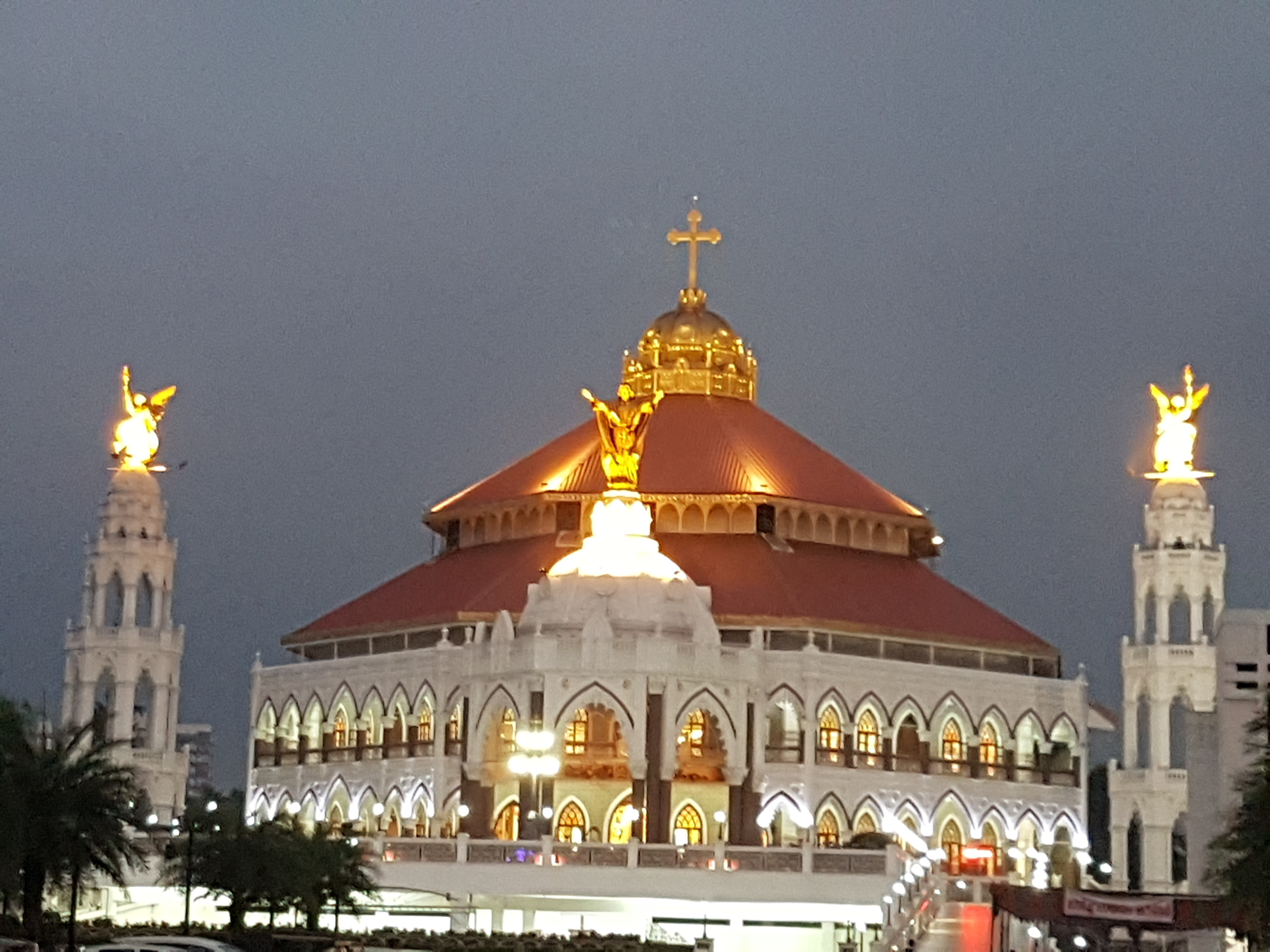

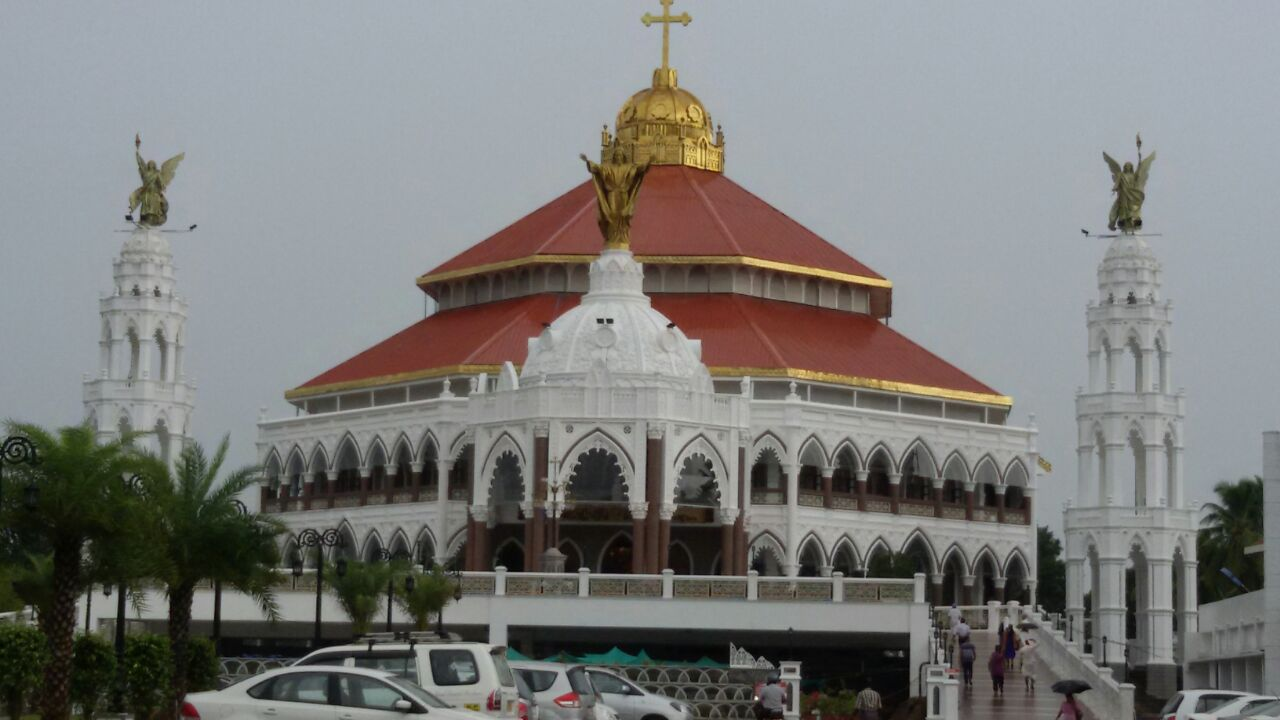

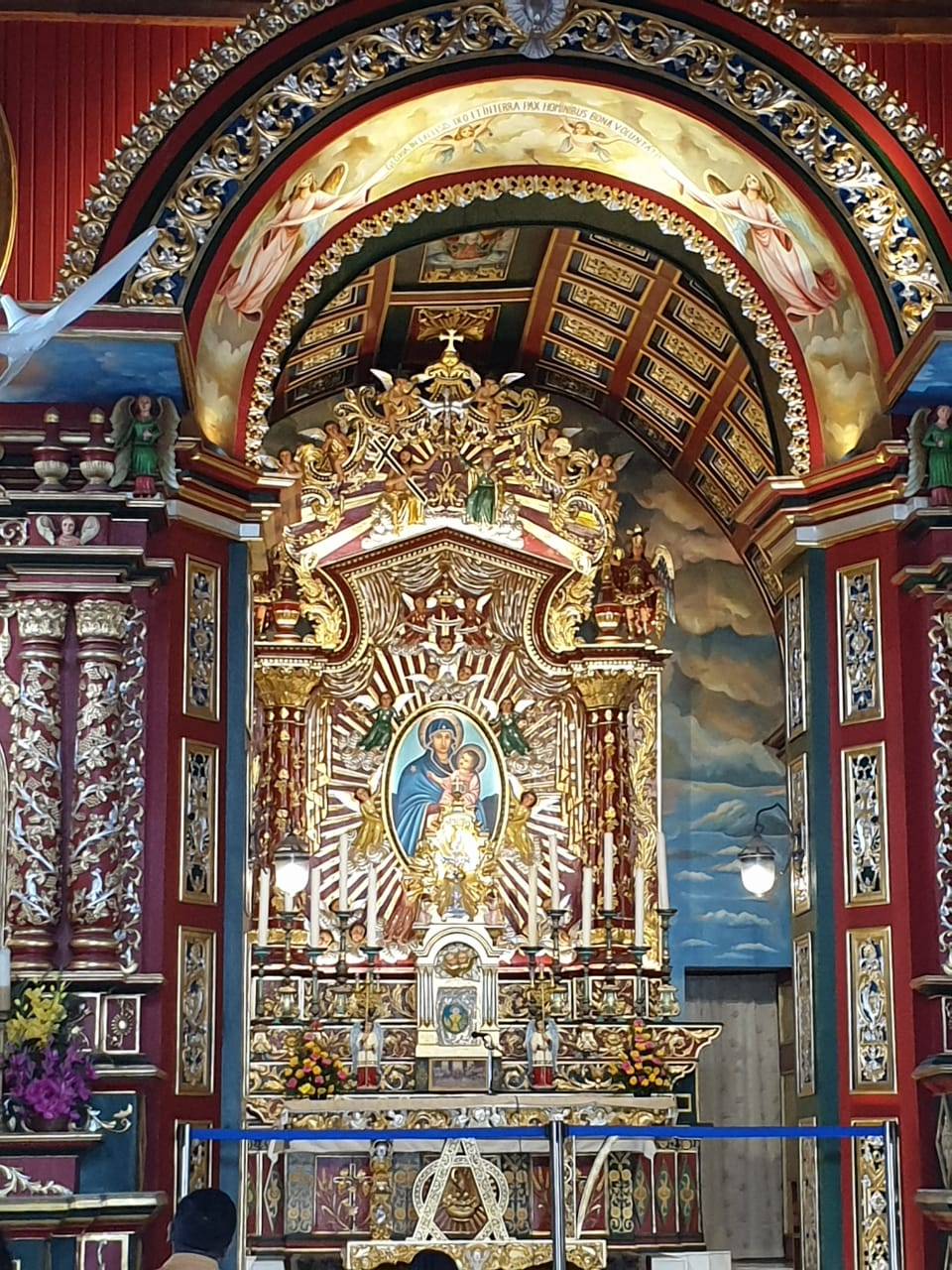

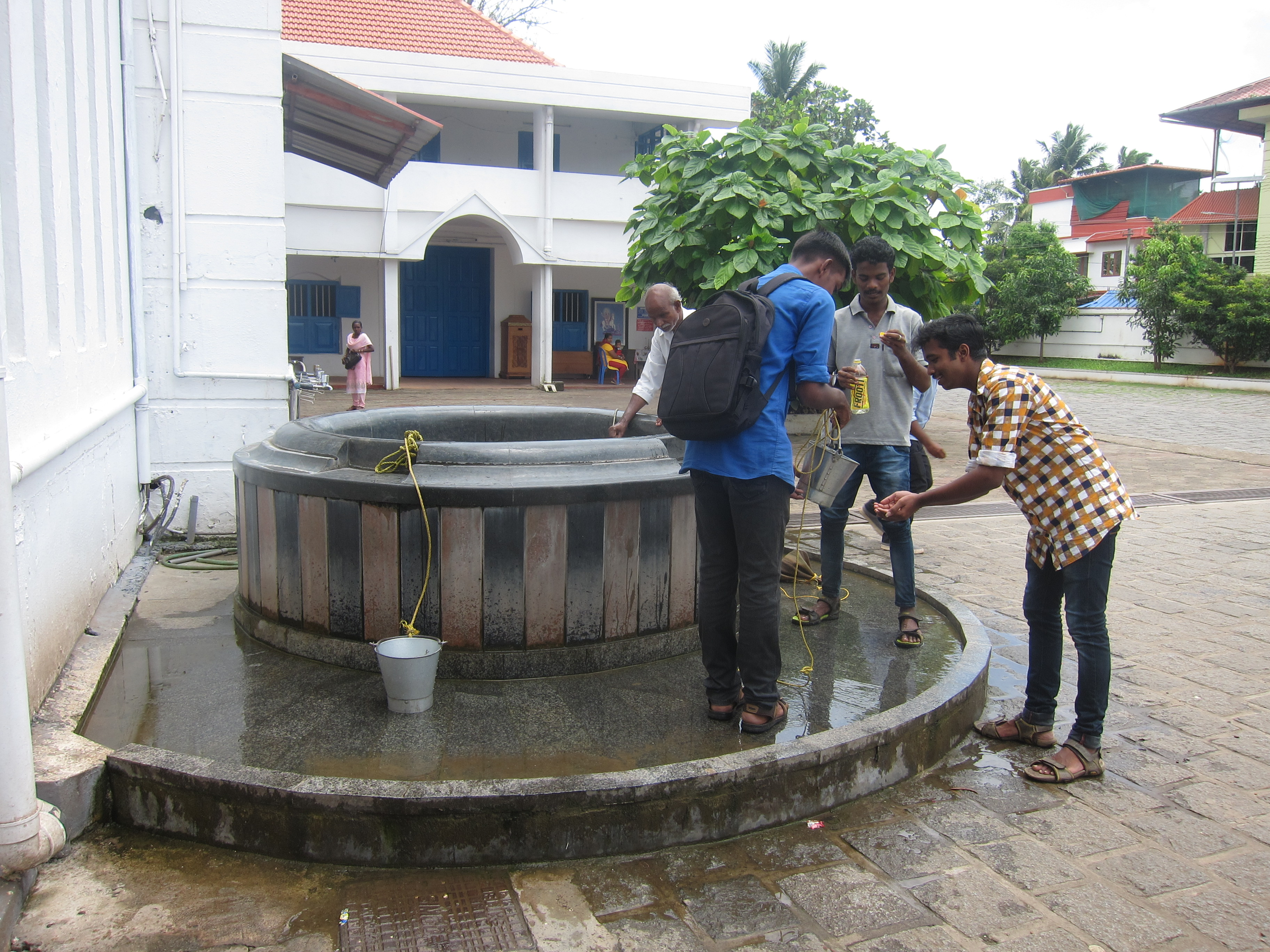

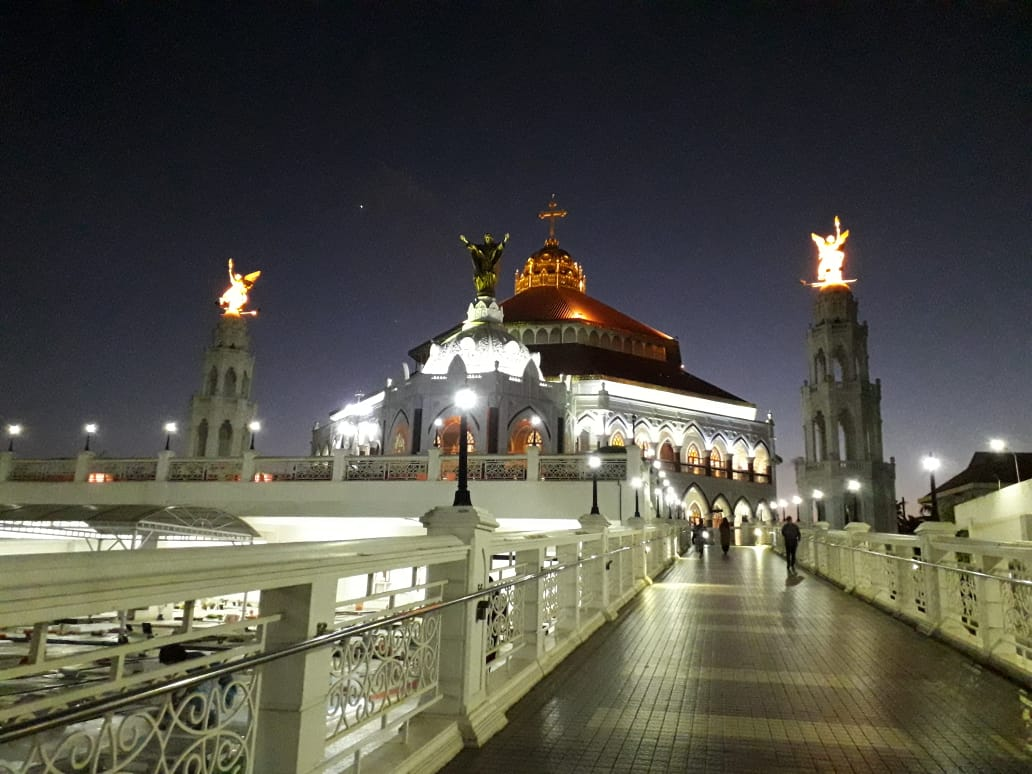

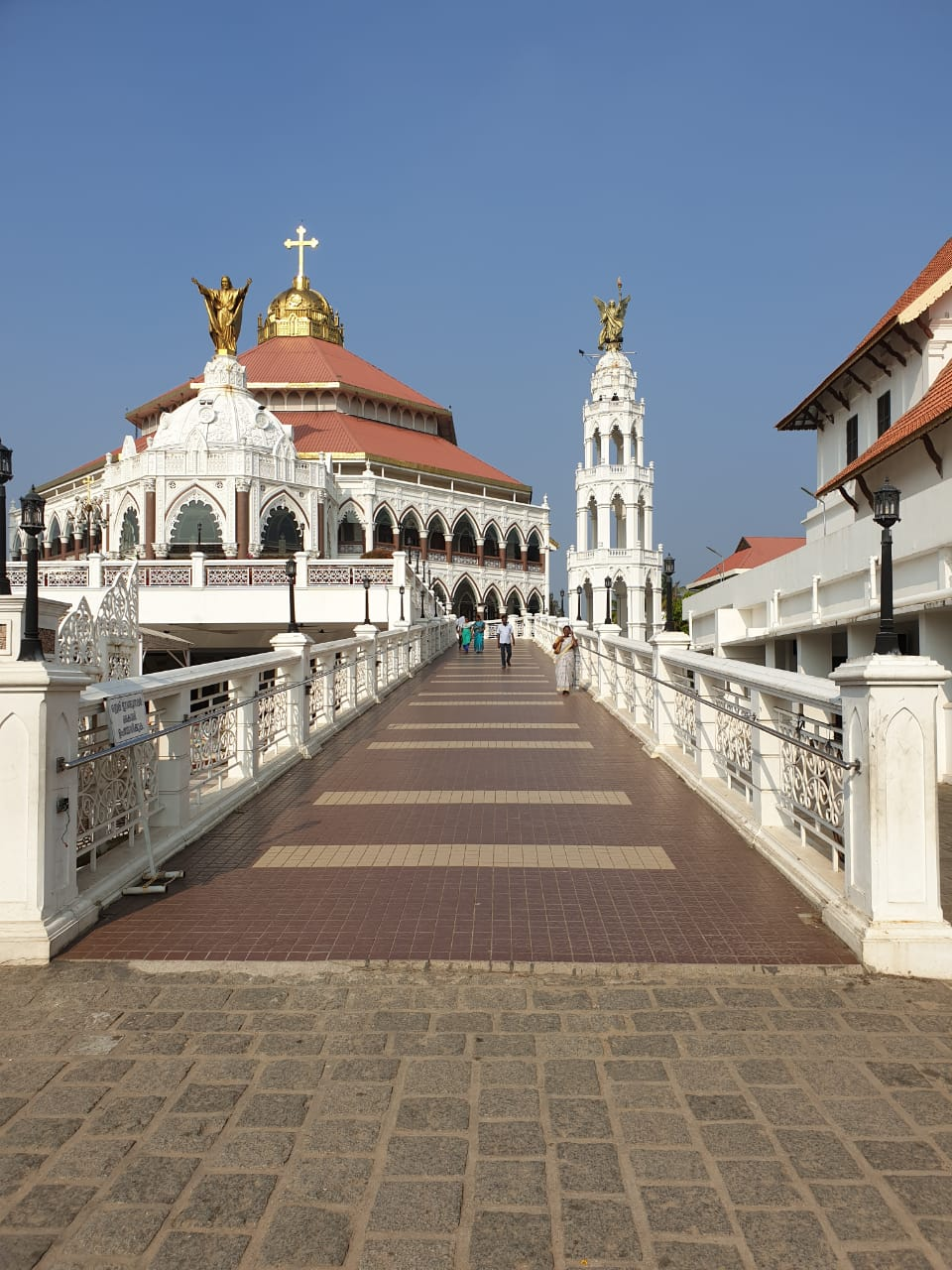

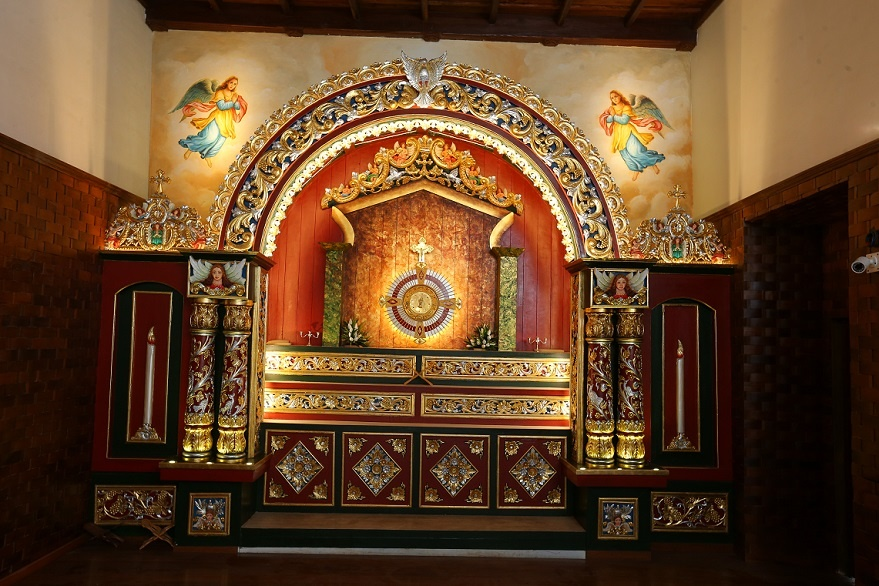

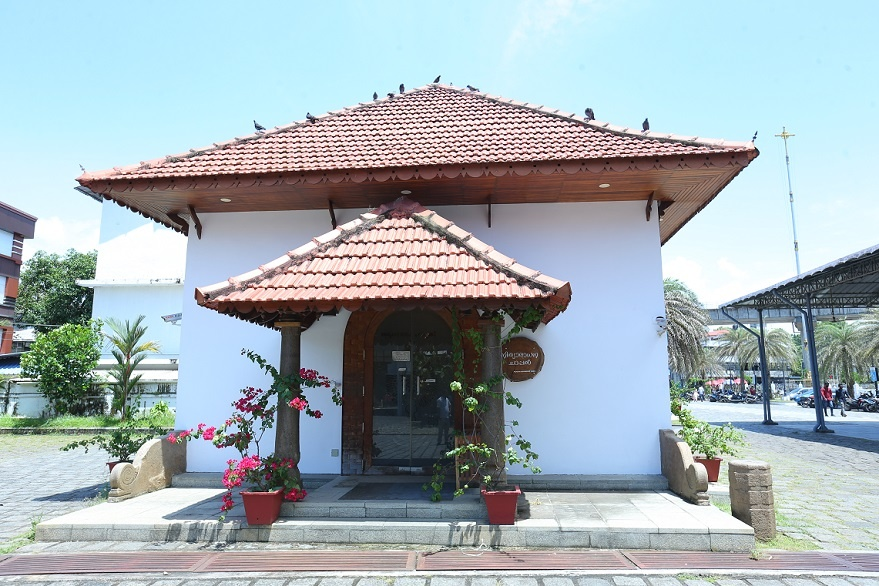

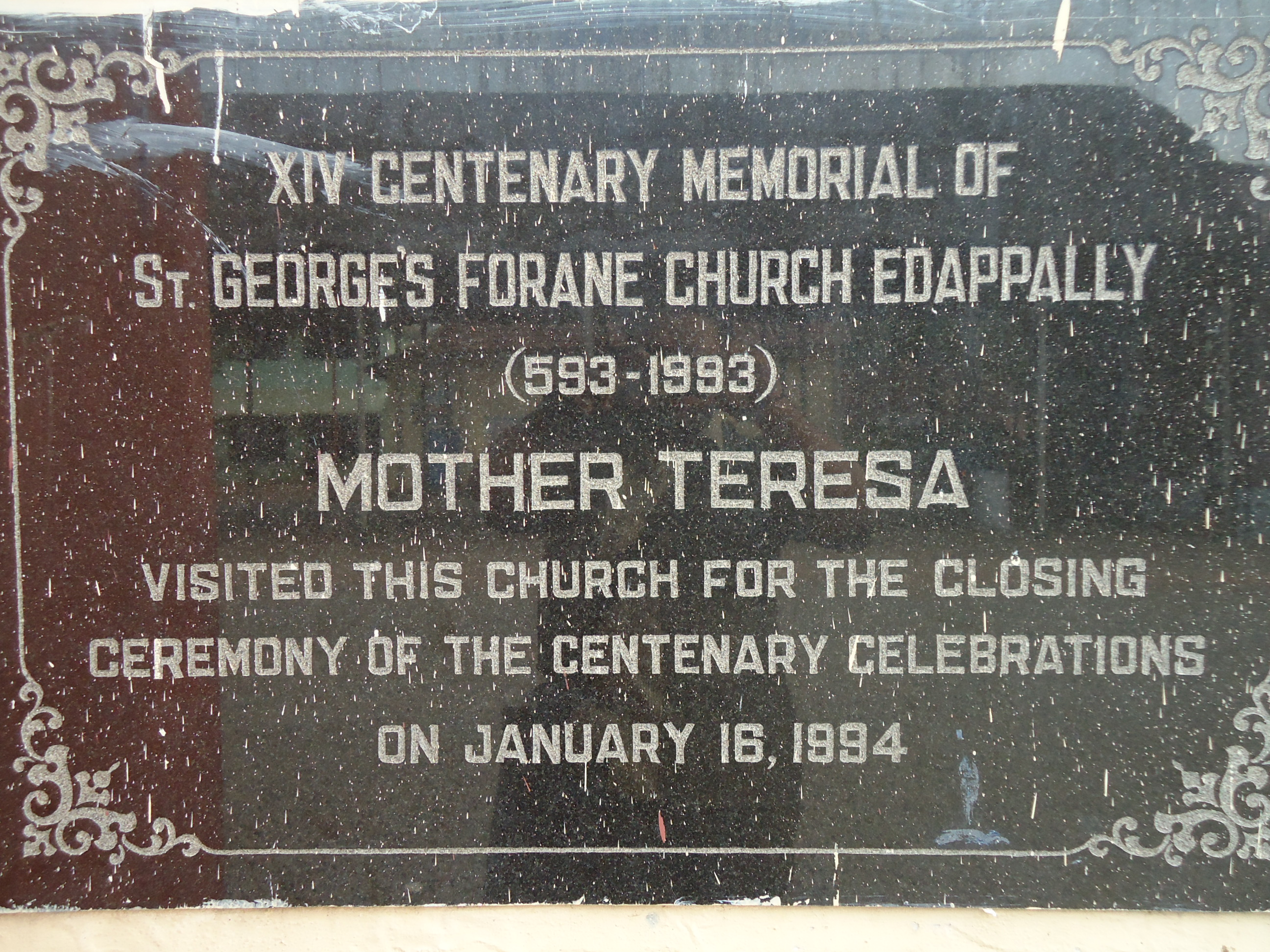

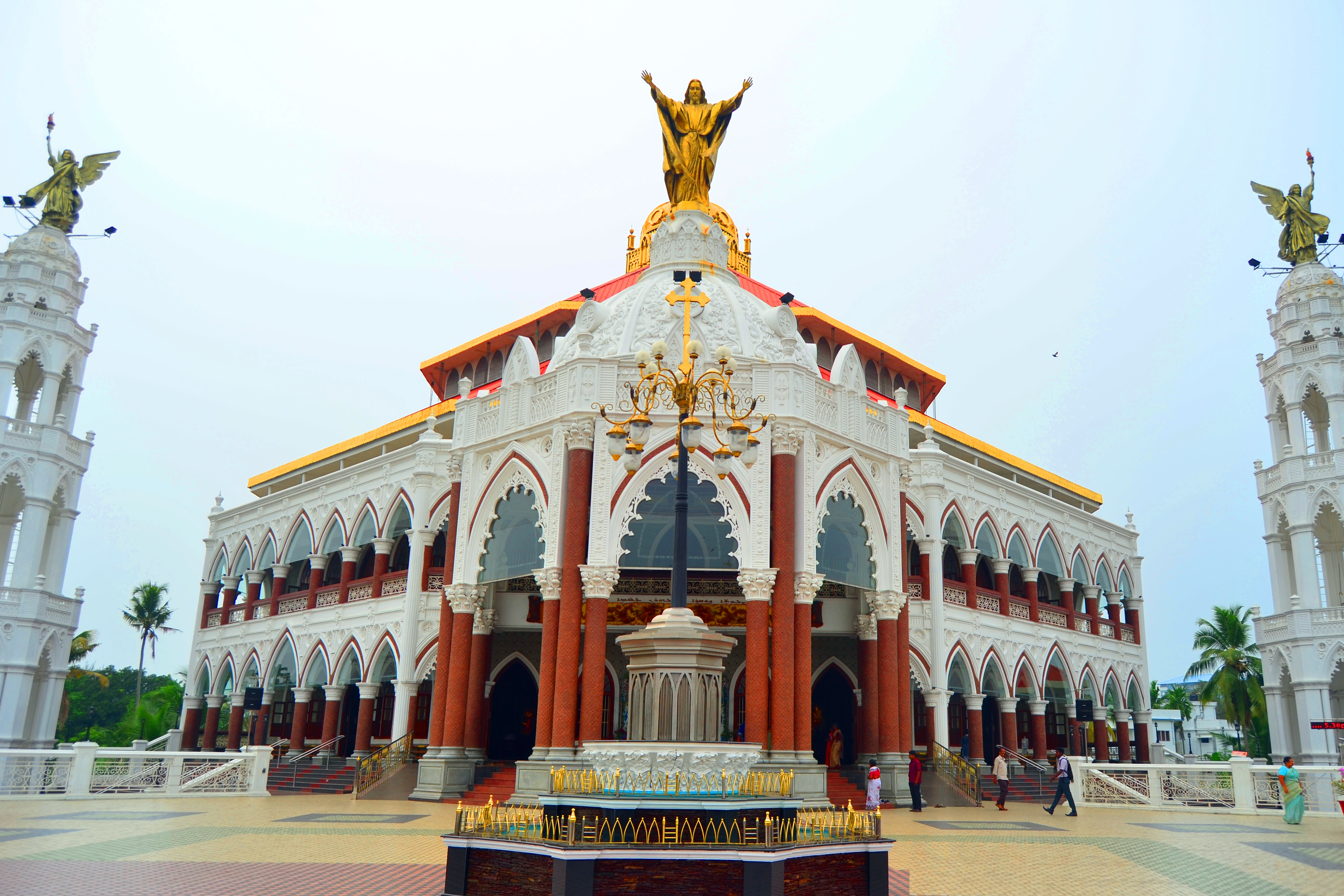

== See also ==
- Kottakkavu Mar Thoma Syro-Malabar Church, North Paravur
- Mar Hormizd Syro-Malabar Church, Angamaly
